= 2024–25 Arsenal F.C. season =

English football club season

Arsenal F.C.
2024–25 season
- Owner: Kroenke Sports & Entertainment
- Co-chairmen: Stan Kroenke; Josh Kroenke
- Manager: Mikel Arteta
- Stadium: Emirates Stadium
- Premier League: 2nd
- FA Cup: Third round
- EFL Cup: Semi-finals
- UEFA Champions League: Semi-finals
- Top goalscorer: League: Kai Havertz (9); All: Kai Havertz (15)
- Highest home attendance: 60,383 v Liverpool (27 Oct 2024, Premier League)
- Lowest home attendance: 59,056 v Bolton Wanderers (25 Sep 2024, EFL Cup)
- Average home league attendance: 60,251
- Biggest win: 7–1 v PSV Eindhoven (Away, 4 Mar 2025, UEFA Champions League)
- Biggest defeat: 0–2 v Bournemouth (Away, 19 Oct 2024, Premier League); 0–2 v Newcastle United (Home, 7 Jan 2025, EFL Cup); 0–2 v Newcastle United (Away, 5 Feb 2025, EFL Cup)
Home colours	Away colours	Third colours

The 2024–25 season was Arsenal Football Club's 33rd season in the Premier League, their 99th consecutive season in the top flight of English football, and 108th season in the top flight overall. In addition to the domestic league, Arsenal also participated in this season's editions of the FA Cup, EFL Cup and UEFA Champions League, the latter of which was their 39th European campaign. The season covers the period from 1 July 2024 to 30 June 2025.

Managed by Mikel Arteta in his fifth full season, Arsenal finished as Premier League runners-up for the third consecutive campaign and reached the semi-finals of the Champions League for the first time since 2008–09.

== Review ==
=== Background ===
The 2023–24 campaign was a record-breaking season for Arsenal. They kicked off their campaign by winning the FA Community Shield for the 17th time in their history.

The Gunners were the third-youngest team in the 2023–24 Premier League with an average starting age of 25 years and 158 days. They scored 91 goals in the Premier League, their highest-ever total in the competition. It was the most they had netted in a league campaign since 1952–53. Arteta's side conceded just 29 goals in the Premier League – five fewer than the second-lowest team. This was Arsenal's best defensive record for 20 years. They finished with a goal difference of +62 in the division, their highest-ever total in the competition's history. The Gunners kept 18 clean sheets (7 at home, 11 on the road) in the league, five more than the second-highest sides.

Arsenal won 28 Premier League games in the 2023–24 season, their highest tally in a top-flight campaign since 1970–71. The Gunners picked up 89 points, the second-highest total in their history. However, this was still not enough to win the Premier League title. Arteta's side ended their season as runners-up – the third-best second-placed team in the competition's history – two points behind champions Manchester City.

After a six-year absence, Arsenal started their 20th UEFA Champions League campaign since the 1992–93 season in September 2023. They finished the group stage as winners of Group B, with the highest goal difference of any team (+12). The Gunners progressed to the quarter-final of the Champions League for the first time since 2009–10, ending a run of seven consecutive last-16 eliminations in the competition. Their first Champions League campaign in seven years finished in the last eight, after a 3–2 aggregate loss to German side Bayern Munich.

=== Pre-season ===
The UEFA Euro 2024 took place in Germany from 14 June to 14 July. Ten Arsenal players (excluding loaned out players) were named in squads for the tournament: Leandro Trossard (Belgium), Aaron Ramsdale, Declan Rice and Bukayo Saka (England), William Saliba (France), Kai Havertz (Germany), Jorginho (Italy), Jakub Kiwior (Poland), David Raya (Spain), and Oleksandr Zinchenko (Ukraine). Raya became a Euro 2024 winner as Spain beat England in the final.

Gabriel Magalhães and Gabriel Martinelli were named in Brazil's squad for the 2024 Copa América, held in the United States from 20 June to 14 July. Brazil were eliminated in the quarter-finals on 6 July.

On 24 June, Arsenal announced that Estonian goalkeeper and academy graduate Karl Hein had signed a new contract.

It was reported on 15 July that the first-team players who had not been away on international duty at Euro 2024 or Copa América were back to the London Colney training ground for pre-season training.

On 21 July, manager Arteta named an initial 26-man squad – including 12 academy players – for the trip to the United States where they would play three friendlies.

Three days later, Arsenal faced Premier League side Bournemouth at Dignity Health Sports Park in Carson, California. Fábio Vieira gave the Gunners a first-half lead with a volley. The Cherries equalised through a deflected Antoine Semenyo effort in the second half. Following the game, a pre-planned penalty shootout took place, which saw Arteta's side triumph 5–4 with Kiwior netting the winning spot-kick after Hein made two saves.

On 27 July, the Gunners took on Premier League club Manchester United at SoFi Stadium, the home of the National Football League's Los Angeles Rams which is also owned by Kroenke Sports and Entertainment. Rasmus Højlund gave United an early lead. Gabriel Jesus levelled for Arteta's side with a close-range finish. Substitute Martinelli scored a late goal, helping Arsenal win 2–1. In the post-match penalty shootout, United won 4–3 following misses from Havertz and Kiwior.

Arsenal played their third and final game of the 10-day USA tour against Premier League side Liverpool at Lincoln Financial Field in Philadelphia on 31 July. Goals from Mohamed Salah and Fábio Carvalho gave Liverpool a 2–0 lead. The Gunners pulled one back through Havertz's close-range shot, but they were unable to find an equaliser. After the game, Arteta's team flew back to London overnight.

On 6 August, the club confirmed that Zinchenko would wear the number 17 shirt, moving from his previous number 35.

The Gunners continued their preparations for the new season with a 4–1 win over reigning Bundesliga champions Bayer Leverkusen at Emirates Stadium on 7 August. Zinchenko, Trossard and Gabriel Jesus all scored in the first half. Havertz then added a fourth after half-time. Xabi Alonso's side claimed a late consolation through Adam Hložek.

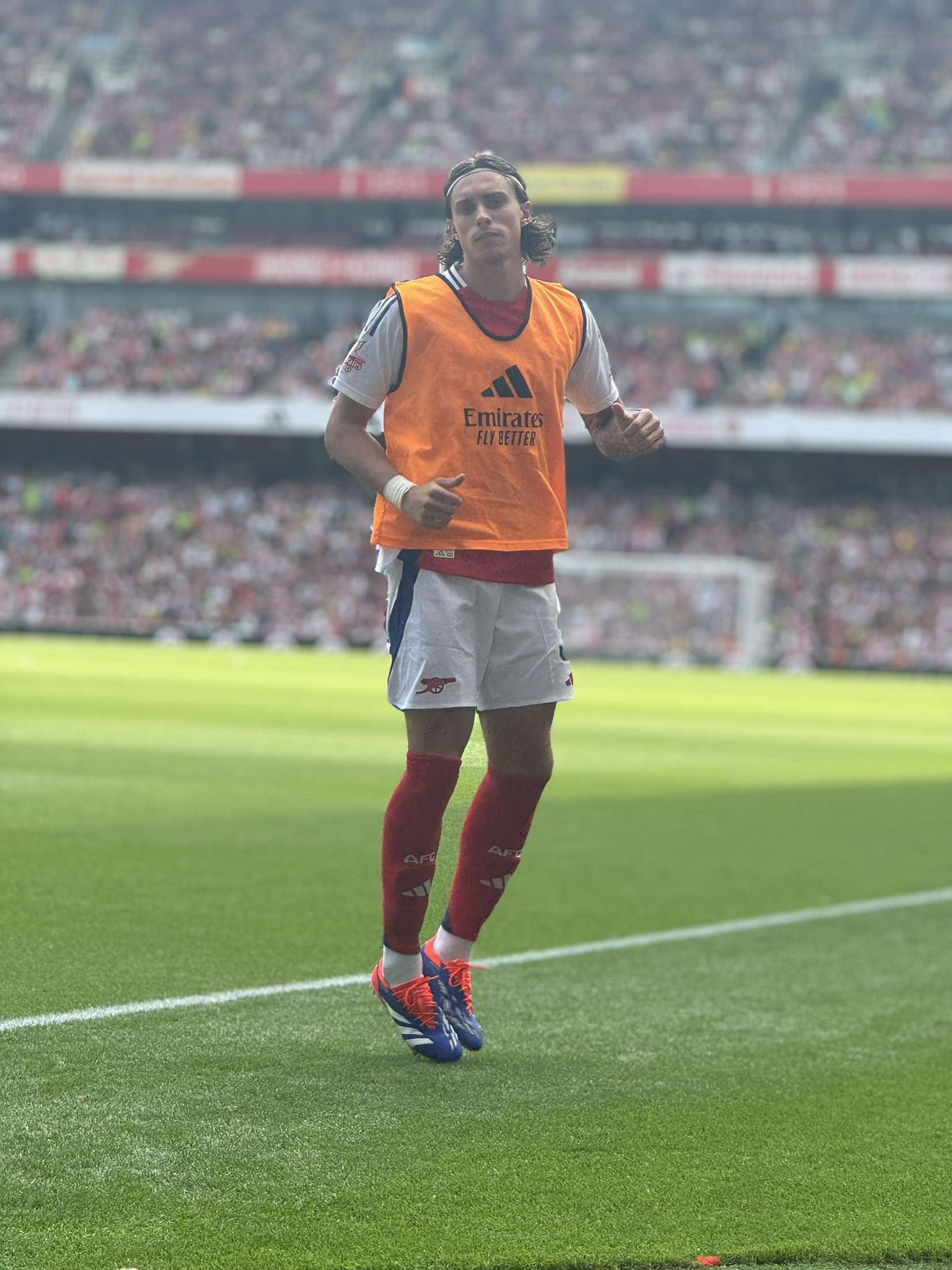
New recruit Riccardo Calafiori warming up in the 2024 Emirates Cup match

Arsenal finished their pre-season campaign by beating Ligue 1 side Lyon 2–0 to claim the 2024 Emirates Cup on 11 August. Saliba and Gabriel Magalhães both scored from Rice corners in the first half. New signing Riccardo Calafiori made his non-competitive debut for the Gunners as a substitute in the 64th minute.

==== First-team transfers (summer transfer window) ====
The Premier League summer transfer window ran from 14 June to 30 August 2024. Arsenal announced on 3 June that they were to release 22 players, two of whom, Mohamed Elneny and Cédric Soares, had made 161 and 64 appearances for the Gunners' first-team in all competitions respectively.

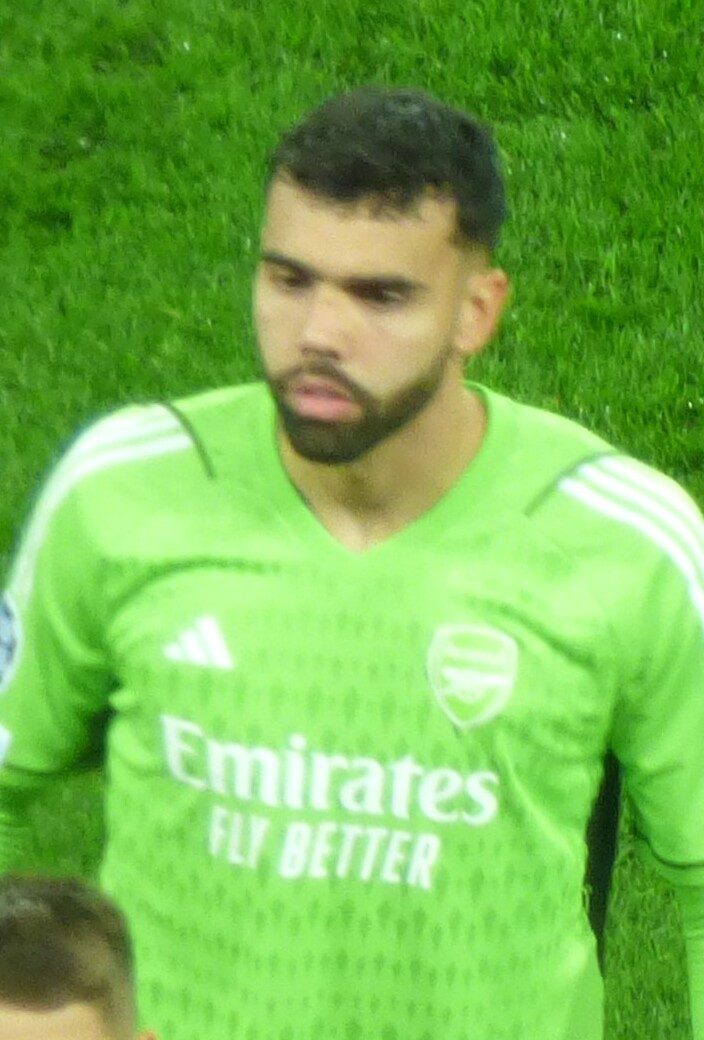
David Raya playing for Arsenal in October 2023

On 4 July, the club confirmed that they had completed the permanent signing of 28-year-old Spanish goalkeeper and reigning Premier League Golden Glove winner David Raya from Premier League side Brentford on a long-term deal after the Spaniard's initial loan spell with the Gunners in 2023–24. The transfer fee was reported to be £27 million. He is the fifteenth player from Spain to represent Arsenal's first team.

On 15 July, the Gunners announced the departures of two first-team players: Belgian midfielder Albert Sambi Lokonga joined La Liga club Sevilla on a season-long loan, and Portuguese defender Nuno Tavares joined Serie A side Lazio on a one-year loan.

Arsenal confirmed on 29 July that 22-year-old Italian defender Riccardo Calafiori had joined the club on a long-term contract from Serie A side Bologna, for a reported fee of an initial £33.6 million (€40 million), which could reach £42 million (€50 million) with add-ons. He would wear the number 33 shirt, and would be the fourth Italian to feature for the Gunners in competitive action.

On 2 August, the club announced that English midfielder and academy graduate Emile Smith Rowe, who had made 115 first-team appearances in all competitions for the Gunners, joined Premier League side Fulham on a permanent transfer. The fee was reported to be an initial £27 million, potentially rising to £34 million in add-ons.

The Gunners confirmed on 13 August that Estonian goalkeeper Karl Hein had joined La Liga side Real Valladolid on a one-year loan.

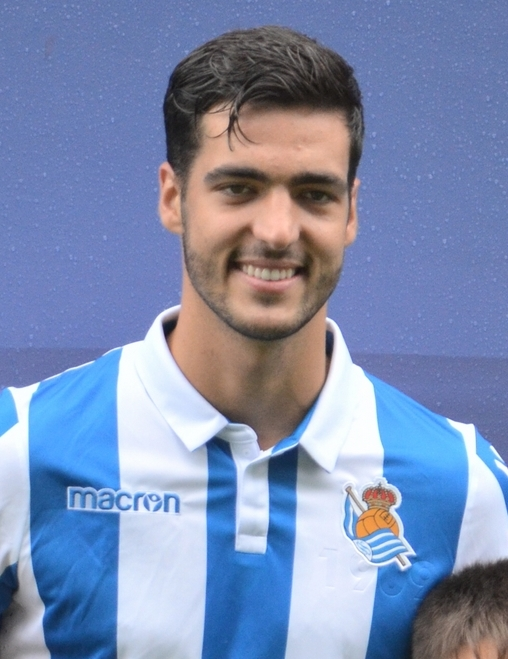
Mikel Merino with Real Sociedad in 2018

On 27 August, Arsenal announced that 28-year-old Spanish midfielder and Euro 2024 winner Mikel Merino had joined the club from La Liga side Real Sociedad on a long-term contract. The transfer fee was reported to be an initial £27.4 million (€32.5 million), with a further £4.2 million (€5 million) in add-ons. He would take the number 23 shirt, and would be the sixteenth Spaniard to play for Arsenal's first team.

On 28 August, the club confirmed the loan departure of Portuguese midfielder Fábio Vieira to Primeira Liga side Porto until the end of the season.

On English transfer deadline day, 30 August, Arsenal announced that the club had signed 35-year-old Brazilian goalkeeper Neto on a season-long loan from Premier League side Bournemouth. He would take the number 32 shirt. On the night 29-year-old English forward Raheem Sterling joined Arsenal on a one-year loan from Premier League club Chelsea after a deal sheet was submitted to allow his move to go through beyond the transfer deadline. He would wear the number 30 shirt.

On the same day, the Gunners confirmed the departures of three first-team players: English Goalkeeper Aaron Ramsdale joined Premier League side Southampton on a permanent transfer for a reported fee of £18 million with £7 million in add-ons. English striker and academy graduate Eddie Nketiah, who had made 168 first-team appearances in all competitions for the Gunners, joined Premier League club Crystal Palace on a permanent deal. The fee was reported to be an initial £25 million, potentially rising to £30 million in add-ons. English forward and academy graduate Reiss Nelson joined Premier League side Fulham on a season-long loan.

After the summer transfer window closed, there were twenty-two players in the first-team squad: two goalkeepers, nine defenders, six midfielders, and five forwards. Six other first-team players were out on loan.

=== August ===
Arteta's side kicked off their Premier League campaign with a 2–0 win over Wolverhampton Wanderers at home on 17 August. Havertz headed in a 25th-minute opener from Saka's cross before the roles were reversed on 74 minutes as Saka picked up Havertz's pass and rifled into the near post. Arsenal goalkeeper Raya made two vital saves to keep out Jørgen Strand Larsen's close-range header and Pablo Sarabia's first-time volley. The result meant that the Gunners had scored in each of their last 34 meetings with Wolves in all competitions, the longest scoring streak against an opponent in the club's history.

Starting XI (4–3–3 formation) for Premier League away match against Aston Villa on 24 August

On 24 August, Arsenal played their first away game of the season against Aston Villa, the only side to complete the league double over the Gunners in the previous campaign. The hosts thought they had taken the lead on 54 minutes when Amadou Onana's deflected shot looped up onto the crossbar, with the rebound falling for an unmarked Ollie Watkins to head home from close range, only for Arsenal goalkeeper Raya to get off the ground to make a stunning one-handed stop, which would later win August 2024's Premier League Save of the Month award. Substitute Trossard broke the deadlock in the 67th minute, sweeping home with his first touch. Partey scored his first away goal in the Premier League on 77 minutes with a long-range effort. Two minutes later, manager Arteta sent on new signing Calafiori for his Gunners debut. The 2–0 win meant that Arsenal had won their first two games in a top-flight campaign without conceding for the third time in their history, after previously doing so in 1924–25 and 1971–72.

On 30 August, Arsenal announced that new recruit Mikel Merino, who joined the club just three days prior, suffered a shoulder injury in his first training session with the team. He would be out of action for a few weeks. Gabriel Jesus and Takehiro Tomiyasu were also out injured.

Ahead of the first international break of the season, the Gunners played at home against Brighton & Hove Albion on 31 August. Arteta was forced to name four academy players on the bench because deadline-day signings Neto and Raheem Sterling were not registered in time to play in this match and there were no other fit senior players up until that point. Arsenal controlled the first half and took the lead in the 38th minute as Havertz lobbed the onrushing goalkeeper from outside of the box. But the game completely changed four minutes into the second half when Rice was shown the first red card of his career by referee Chris Kavanagh, after the midfielder received a controversial second yellow card for "delaying" Joël Veltman's free-kick near the touchline deep in Brighton's half. The visitors equalised on 58 minutes as Pedro tucked home the rebound after Raya saved Yankuba Minteh's shot. 10-man Arsenal fought hard to prevent conceding another goal and the game ended 1–1.

=== September ===
Twelve Arsenal players (excluding players who were loaned out) were named in their respective countries' senior squads for international fixtures in September: Gabriel Magalhães (Brazil), Rice and Saka (England), Saliba (France), Partey (as Ghana's captain), Havertz (Germany), Calafiori (Italy), Jurriën Timber (Netherlands), Martin Ødegaard (as Norway's captain), Kiwior (Poland), Raya (Spain), and Zinchenko (Ukraine).

On 4 September, the club submitted their 2024–25 Champions League squad for the league phase of the competition. Twenty-two first-team players and young goalkeeper Tommy Setford who joined Arsenal's academy from Dutch side Ajax in July 2024, were registered on the Squad List A. Nine days later, the club confirmed that 22 first-team players and 48 under-21 players were registered on the 2024–25 Premier League Squad List for the first half of the season.

Arsenal announced on 12 September that manager Arteta had signed a new contract with the club, reportedly keeping him at Emirates Stadium until 2027. A day later, Arsenal confirmed that Ødegaard suffered an ankle injury during Norway's game against Austria on 9 September, and Calafiori also returned from Italy duty with a calf injury.

Starting XI (4–4–2) for Premier League away match against Tottenham Hotspur on 15 September

The Gunners continued their Premier League campaign with a North London derby away against 10th-placed Tottenham Hotspur on 15 September. Arteta faced a sudden lack of midfield options and was forced to name five academy players on the bench, because six first-team players were injured up until that point and Rice was suspended for the game. In the 64th minute, Gabriel Magalhães netted the only goal of the game with a header from Saka's corner, becoming the fourth Arsenal player to score 10+ headed goals in the Premier League. New loan signing Sterling made his debut for Arsenal as a substitute on 80 minutes. The 1–0 win meant that the Gunners had won six consecutive Premier League away matches for the first time since 2013, and they had won three consecutive away North London derbies for the first time since 1988. The result sent them back to the second of the Premier League table.

Arsenal opened their 2024–25 Champions League campaign in Bergamo, Italy, facing the previous season's Europa League champions Atalanta on 19 September. In the 48th minute with the score at 0–0, the hosts were awarded a penalty after Partey had fouled Éderson. However, Raya made a brilliant double save to keep out Mateo Retegui's attempt and follow-up header. He became the fourth Arsenal goalkeeper to save a penalty in the Champions League, after Richard Wright, Jens Lehmann and Łukasz Fabiański. The game ended goalless.

The Gunners played their third consecutive away game in seven days against 1st-placed Manchester City on 22 September. Erling Haaland opened the scoring early on for the hosts. Arteta's side drew level with a long-range stunner scored by Calafiori, then took the lead through a Gabriel Magalhães header. However, in the final seconds of the first half, Trossard was given a controversial second yellow card for "kicking the ball away and delaying a restart" by referee Michael Oliver. It was later revealed by broadcaster Sky Sports that there was just 0.84 seconds between Oliver's whistle and Trossard kicking the ball way. 10-man Arsenal battled hard in the second half until the eighth minute of stoppage time when John Stones latched onto a rebound and netted an equaliser for the hosts. The game also saw academy player Myles Lewis-Skelly make his senior debut for the Gunners as a substitute in the second half. In the post-match press conference, Arteta confirmed that White came on to help the team for the second-half despite being injured.

Arsenal's 2024–25 EFL Cup campaign began in the third round against League One side Bolton Wanderers at home on 25 September. Arteta opted to rest several first-team players and chose a youthful line-up with an average age of 23 years and 87 days – the youngest starting XI the Spaniard has named in his near-five-year spell as Gunners boss. With number one stopper Raya and 18-year-old understudy Tommy Setford injured and summer loan signing Neto cup-tied, Arteta called on Arsenal's fourth choice Jack Porter, who at 16 years and 72 days became the youngest goalkeeper to play for Arsenal's first team, and the youngest player to start an Arsenal first-team match. Another debutant Josh Nichols also received his first start. Rice put the Gunners ahead on 16 minutes. Ethan Nwaneri netted his first two senior goals for Arsenal in the 37th and 49th minute respectively, becoming the youngest player to score for the club's first team since 2008, and to notch a brace since 2004. Aaron Collins pulled one back for Bolton on 53 minutes. Sterling netted his first Arsenal goal in the 64th minute. Defender Maldini Kacurri made his senior debut as a substitute in the 70th minute, becoming the first Albanian national to represent Arsenal's first team in the club's history. Havertz wrapped up the scoring on 77 minutes. Young winger Ismeal Kabia received his debut in the 81st minute. The 5–1 result advanced Arsenal to the next round.

On 28 September, Arteta's side played at home against newly promoted Leicester City. Martinelli opened the scoring for Arsenal, ending his 19-game goal drought dating back to 4 March. Trossard doubled the lead on the stroke of half-time. But James Justin's deflected header and first-time volley after the interval brought Leicester back level. The Gunners restored their two-goal advantage in second-half stoppage time through a Wilfred Ndidi own goal and a Havertz strike. The game ended 4–2.

=== October ===

Starting XI (4–4–2) for Champions League home match against Paris Saint-Germain on 1 October

Arsenal returned to Champions League action on 1 October, hosting the previous season's Ligue 1 champions and Champions League semi-finalists Paris Saint-Germain. The Gunners took the lead in the 20th minute through Havertz. Fifteen minutes later, Saka curled a low free-kick from wide on the right into a crowded penalty area; the ball somehow evaded everyone and flew straight into the back of the net. It was Arsenal's first direct free-kick goal in the Champions League since November 2002. In the 64th minute Arteta handed a belated debut to summer signing Merino who had recovered from a shoulder injury. The game ended 2–0.

Ahead of the second international break of the campaign, Arteta's men played their seventh match in 21 days on 5 October when they faced newly promoted Southampton at home. Second-half goals from Havertz, Martinelli and Saka saw the Gunners come from behind to win 3–1 and extend their unbeaten start to the season to ten games. This was Arsenal's 400th Premier League home victory, making them the second side to reach the milestone. Havertz became the first Arsenal player to score in seven consecutive home appearances in all competitions since 2011–12.

Ten Arsenal players (excluding loaned out players) joined up with their respective senior national teams for international fixtures in October: Trossard (Belgium), Gabriel Magalhães and Martinelli (Brazil), Rice and Saka (England), Saliba (France), Calafiori (Italy), Kiwior (Poland), Merino and Raya (Spain).

Arsenal faced 13th-placed Bournemouth away on 19 October. Already missing Ødegaard and Saka through injury, the Gunners lost Saliba in the 30th minute as the French centre-back was shown the first red card of his career for a foul on Evanilson near the halfway line after a poor backwards pass from Trossard. Saliba was initially given a yellow card, but the referee upgraded his decision to a red after being instructed to check the pitchside monitor by video assistant referee Jarred Gillett. Martinelli missed a golden chance to put 10-man Arsenal in front on 69 minutes, shooting straight at the Bournemouth goalkeeper from close range. Just a minute later, Ryan Christie broke the deadlock with a first-time shot following a Bournemouth corner routine. Kiwior's loose backpass on 77 minutes resulted in the hosts scoring a decisive second goal from the penalty spot. The 2–0 loss was Arsenal's first defeat of the season, and their first away loss in the Premier League in 2024.

Arteta's side hosted the previous season's Ukrainian Premier League champions Shakhtar Donetsk in the Champions League on 22 October. In the 29th minute, Martinelli's low shot hit the post and then rebounded back into the net off Shakhtar goalkeeper Dmytro Riznyk. The Gunners had the chance to extend the lead in the final 20 minutes, as Merino's cross was handled and they were awarded a penalty after a VAR review. But Trossard's spot-kick was poor and saved by Riznyk. In stoppage time Raya produced a flying save to deny Pedrinho's long-range shot, helping Arsenal win 1–0. The result meant that the Gunners had recorded three successive clean sheets in the Champions League for the first time since 2007.

On 27 October, the Gunners played at home against 1st-placed Liverpool. Saka opened the scoring in the ninth minute with a near-post finish, becoming the youngest Arsenal player to net 50 Premier League goals. Virgil van Dijk levelled for Liverpool on 18 minutes with a close-range header. Arteta's side retook the lead in the 41st minute when Merino headed home his first Arsenal goal from Rice's free-kick. The Gunners were undermined by injuries to key defenders Gabriel Magalhães and Timber after the break, having already been without the suspended Saliba and injured Calafiori. The pressure on their backline was consequently mounting before Liverpool equalised through Mohamed Salah on 81 minutes. In second-half stoppage time Gabriel Jesus bundled the ball home, but referee Anthony Taylor had already blown for a foul by Kiwior in the build-up. The game ended 2–2.

Arsenal continued their EFL Cup campaign on 30 October, facing Championship side Preston North End away in the fourth round. Arteta handed a belated debut to teenage goalkeeper Tommy Setford, who missed the third-round game against Bolton Wanderers through injury in September. Gabriel Jesus opened the scoring for the Gunners, ending his 24-game goal drought dating back to 30 January. Nwaneri doubled the lead with a curling effort into the top corner, becoming the youngest player to net in each of his first two starts for Arsenal. Second-half substitute Havertz rounded off the scoring with a header. Young defender Ayden Heaven received his debut in the final ten minutes. The 3–0 result advanced Arsenal to the quarter-finals.

=== November ===
The Gunners faced 12th-placed Newcastle United away on 2 November. Alexander Isak scored the only goal of the game for the hosts in the 12th minute. Arsenal had good chances to draw level, with Merino's shot blocked on the line and Rice heading wide from close range in either half. This was the first time since May 2022 that Arsenal had lost successive away matches in the Premier League. It was revealed later that Rice had suffered a broken toe in this game.

Arteta's men made the trip to Italy for the Champions League match against the previous season's Serie A champions Inter Milan on 6 November. Ødegaard returned to the bench after missing 12 Arsenal games with injury. The Gunners had a penalty shout in the 28th minute when Merino appeared to beat Inter goalkeeper Yann Sommer to a high ball in the box and took a punch to the head in the process, but VAR decided not to overturn a no-penalty decision. In first-half stoppage time, the hosts were awarded a spot-kick after the ball ricocheted into Merino's arm at close range, although he did not have time to move his arm out of the way. Hakan Çalhanoğlu then scored from the penalty spot – Inter's only shot on target throughout the game. Arsenal dominated the second half but could not find a way past the hosts' defence. The 1–0 defeat was Arsenal's third away loss in 18 days.

On 10 November, the Gunners faced 4th-placed Chelsea away in their final fixture before the third international break of the season. After a scoreless first half that saw Havertz had a goal ruled out for offside by VAR, Martinelli put Arsenal in front on the hour mark when he tucked home a cross by Ødegaard, who made his first start since 31 August. Pedro Neto slammed in from distance to drag the hosts level 10 minutes later. Arsenal squandered a golden chance in stoppage time, as Saliba played an inviting ball across the Chelsea box, but Trossard poked wide from close range, with Havertz waiting to tap home behind him. The 1–1 draw meant that the Gunners had gone four consecutive Premier League matches without a win for the first time since April 2023.

A run of early-season injuries for Arteta's side continued, as it was reported on 13 November that White had undergone a surgery to resolve a knee issue that he had been carrying for weeks, and would be sidelined for months.

Ten Arsenal players (excluding players who were loaned out) joined up with their respective senior national teams for international fixtures in November: Trossard (Belgium), Gabriel Magalhães and Martinelli (Brazil), Saliba (France), Havertz (Germany), Timber (Netherlands), Kiwior (Poland), Merino and Raya (Spain), and Zinchenko (Ukraine).

The Gunners played at home against 5th-placed Nottingham Forest on 23 November. This was Arteta's 250th game in charge of Arsenal in all competitions, the 10th manager to reach the milestone for the club. Goals early in each half from Saka and Partey gave the Gunners a 2–0 lead. Nwaneri netted a late goal, becoming Arsenal's second-youngest scorer in the Premier League. The win was the Gunners' 2,000th in English top-flight history, making them the second side to reach this landmark.

Starting XI (4–3–3) for Champions League away match against Sporting CP on 26 November

On 26 November, Arsenal recorded their biggest away win in the Champions League since 2003 by thumping the previous season's Primeira Liga champions Sporting CP 5–1 in Lisbon, Portugal. Saliba made his 100th senior appearance for the Gunners, and Ødegaard made his first Champions League start of the season. Martinelli tapped in an early opener, before Havertz finished a team goal and Gabriel Magalhães headed home a corner on the stroke of half-time. Although Gonçalo Inácio pulled one back for Sporting shortly after the break, Saka's penalty and Trossard's header from a rebound secured Arsenal's victory. This was the first time since 2008 that the Gunners had scored five or more goals in an away game in the Champions League, and was the first time since 2008 that they had had five different scorers (excluding own goals) in a major European away match. The win lifted Arsenal into the top eight automatic qualification positions of the Champions League league phase.

Arteta's side faced 14th-placed West Ham United away on 30 November, winning 5–2 to move up to second place in the Premier League table. All seven goals came in the first half – equalling the Premier League record for the highest number of goals in a first half, with Gabriel Magalhães, Trossard, Ødegaard and Havertz putting the Gunners 4–0 up after 35 minutes. Two quickfire strikes from the hosts halved the deficit. Saka wrapped up the scoring with a penalty just before the break. This was the first time in Premier League history that Arsenal have scored two first-half penalties, as Ødegaard had also dispatched from the spot.

=== December ===

Starting XI (4–3–3) for Premier League home match against Manchester United on 4 December

On 4 December, Arsenal played their 500th competitive men's first-team game at Emirates Stadium against 9th-placed Manchester United. Timber broke the deadlock on 54 minutes when he flicked Rice's corner in at the near post for his first Gunners goal. In the 67th minute, Raya made a one-handed save at full stretch to claw away Matthijs de Ligt's header from a free-kick. Arteta's side doubled their advantage in the 73rd minute, as Saka's far-post corner was headed back across by Partey, the ball bounced in off Saliba's backside. The 2–0 win meant that Arsenal had won four consecutive league games against Manchester United for the first time in their history.

Arteta's side faced 6th-placed Fulham away on 8 December. Ødegaard made his 100th start as Arsenal's captain. Raúl Jiménez put the hosts ahead in the 11th minute. Saliba levelled for the Gunners with a close-range finish from a corner routine on 52 minutes. Saka headed home in the 88th minute, but the goal was ruled out after a VAR review for offside against Martinelli in the build-up. The game ended 1–1.

The Gunners hosted the previous season's Ligue 1 runners-up Monaco in the Champions League on 11 December. 18-year-old Myles Lewis-Skelly was handed his first Champions League start, becoming the youngest player to start for Arsenal in the competition since 2011. He played a key role in Saka's opener in the first half. After the break, Saka scored again and assisted substitute Havertz, helping his side win 3–0. The result moved Arsenal up to third in the Champions League standings.

Arsenal played at home against 15th-placed Everton on 14 December. The Gunners dominated the game and had many chances to score, especially in the first half, but failed to convert any. The match finished 0–0. This was Arsenal's first goalless draw at the Emirates since January 2023.

Four days later, Arsenal hosted Premier League side Crystal Palace in the EFL Cup quarter-finals. The visitors took the lead early through a Jean-Philippe Mateta finish. The Gunners turned the game around in the second half when Gabriel Jesus scored a hat-trick, ending his 367-day Emirates goal drought dating back to 17 December 2023. Former Arsenal player Eddie Nketiah brought one back for Palace late on. The 3–2 result advanced Arsenal to the semi-finals for the first time since 2021–22 season.

Arteta's men crossed the capital to face Crystal Palace again in the Premier League on 21 December. They wore black armbands in remembrance of George Eastham, who served as Arsenal captain between 1963 and 1966 and was a member of England's 1966 World Cup-winning squad, following the earlier news of his passing. Gabriel Jesus netted two early goals for Arsenal, either side of Ismaïla Sarr's equaliser; while Havertz, Martinelli and Rice all found the net. Raya made several crucial saves during the game, helping the Gunners win 5–1. The victory marked the final away match of 2024 for Arsenal, making them the first team in English top-flight history to score five or more goals in six different away games in all competitions across a full calendar year. The result also meant that the Gunners became the first side to remain unbeaten in Premier League London derbies in a single calendar year since 2005.

On 23 December, Arteta confirmed in the pre-match press conference that Saka would be out for a lengthy period after suffering a hamstring injury in the game against Crystal Palace two days prior, and Sterling would also be sidelined for weeks after picking up a knee injury in training three days prior.

Arsenal ended 2024 with a 1–0 win over newly promoted Ipswich Town at home on 27 December. Havertz scored the only goal of the game. Raya registered his 23rd clean sheet in 50 Premier League appearances for the Gunners, breaking David Seaman's record (22) set in 1993 for the most clean sheets kept by a goalkeeper in his first 50 appearances for Arsenal in the division. This was the first time since 2021 that the Gunners had kept four consecutive home clean sheets in the competition. In the post-match presser, Arteta revealed Saka had undergone surgery to repair his hamstring.

=== January ===
The Gunners started 2025 with a trip to Brentford on New Year's Day. 17-year-old Ethan Nwaneri was handed his first Premier League start, becoming the youngest player to start for Arsenal in the competition since 2006. Bryan Mbeumo gave the hosts an early lead, but a Gabriel Jesus first-half header and second-half strikes from Merino and Martinelli turned the game around. This was the first time since February 2023 that Arsenal had won a Premier League away match in which they fell 1–0 behind. Arteta's side reached the halfway point of the league campaign with eleven wins, six draws, two losses and 39 points from 19 games, six points behind leaders Liverpool who had a game in hand.

Arteta's side faced 10th-placed Brighton & Hove Albion away on 4 January. Nwaneri netted a 16th-minute opener on his second Premier League start, becoming the first Arsenal player to score more than once in the competition before turning 18 years old. But he was forced off with a muscular issue at half-time and was replaced by Martinelli, who made his 200th senior appearance for the Gunners. In the 59th minute, Brighton forward João Pedro flicked the ball up in the Arsenal box. Saliba went to head it away, accidentally making contact with Pedro's head in the air. However, referee Anthony Taylor awarded the hosts a controversial penalty after a few seconds of reflection, adjudging Saliba to have fouled Pedro, and VAR confirmed the decision. Pedro then fired home the equaliser from the spot. Upon replay, it was clear that Saliba had touched the ball with his head as it deviated away from him in a different direction, before the clash of heads. The game ended 1–1.

Arsenal suffered their first home defeat of the season with a 2–0 loss to Newcastle United in the EFL Cup semi-final first leg on 7 January. They dominated the game and had plenty of chances to score, but failed to convert any. In fact, they created more than 3.0 expected goals (xG) from 23 shots throughout the 90 minutes. Alexander Isak and Anthony Gordon netted either side of the interval for the visitors. The result meant that the Magpies departed north London with a two-goal lead heading into the return fixture, which would be on 5 February.

On 12 January, the Gunners entered the FA Cup in the third round, facing Manchester United at home. Gabriel Jesus was stretchered off in the first half after an aerial challenge. Bruno Fernandes opened the scoring for the visitors in the second half. Arsenal levelled through Gabriel Magalhães after Diogo Dalot was sent off for a second bookable offence. Ødegaard then saw his penalty saved, and further missed chances – from Havertz and Rice among others – sent the match to extra-time. After a goalless extra 30 minutes, the tie finished 1–1. The Gunners ultimately lost 5–3 on penalties after Havertz's spot-kick was saved. Two days later, Arsenal confirmed that Gabriel Jesus had sustained an injury to the anterior cruciate ligament in his left knee and was set for surgery. The club did not give a timeframe for his absence.

Arsenal returned to Premier League action on 15 January, hosting 12th-placed Tottenham Hotspur in the second North London derby of the season. Son Heung-Min's deflected effort gave the visitors the lead, but a Dominic Solanke own goal and a Trossard strike turned the game around before half-time. There were no further goals in the second half and the game ended 2–1. The result meant that the Gunners had won three consecutive league matches against their nearest rivals for the first time since 1989.

Arteta's side played at home against 7th-placed Aston Villa on 18 January. They took a 2–0 lead courtesy of close-range goals from Martinelli and Havertz either side of half-time. Villa's Youri Tielemans and Ollie Watkins both struck to level the scores. Arsenal thought they had found a late winner when Merino's shot deflected off Havertz into the net, but it was ruled out for handball after a swift VAR review. This was the first time since October 2019 that the Gunners had failed to win a Premier League home game in which they had led by two or more goals.

Starting XI (4–3–3) for Champions League home match against Dinamo Zagreb on 22 January

Arsenal hosted the previous season's Croatian League champions Dinamo Zagreb in the Champions League on 22 January. The match saw several records set. Arteta's side took the lead in the second minute when Havertz cushioned a cross into the path of Rice, who volleyed home his first Champions League goal and Arsenal's earliest in the competition since 2014. The Gunners doubled their advantage on 66 minutes as Havertz headed in his 14th goal of the season in all competitions, matching his total from the previous term. It was also the 500th goal Arsenal had scored in all competitions under manager Arteta. In the 74th minute, Trossard came off the bench to replace Havertz, becoming the second Belgian to reach 100 appearances for the club. Ødegaard added a third in stoppage time as he tucked in Trossard's deflected cross. The game also saw academy player Nathan Butler-Oyedeji come on for the final few minutes to make his senior debut for the Gunners. The 3–0 victory meant that Arsenal had won three consecutive Champions League games by three or more goals for the first time in their history.

The Gunners' eighth match of the month was against 17th-placed Wolverhampton Wanderers on the road on 25 January. Academy players Lewis-Skelly and Nwaneri were both named in the starting line-up, becoming the first two English players aged 18 or under to start a Premier League game together for Arsenal since 1998. In the 43rd minute, Lewis-Skelly tripped Matt Doherty just outside the Wolves box to stop the hosts' defender breaking from an Arsenal corner. However, referee Michael Oliver controversially showed a straight red card to the 18-year-old for "serious foul play", and the decision was quickly checked and cleared by video assistant referee Darren England. In the 63rd minute, Raya produced a full-stretch save to deny Matheus Cunha's deflected shot. Seven minutes later, Wolves midfielder João Gomes received a second yellow for a studs-up challenge on Timber, which left both sides a man down for the remainder of the match. In the 74th minute, substitute Calafiori netted the only goal of the game for the Gunners. It was reported on 28 January that Lewis-Skelly would not serve a three-match suspension after Arsenal's appeal against his red card at Wolves was upheld by an FA's independent regulatory commission. The written reasons published by the regulatory commission stated that "the Commission members were unanimous in their opinion that the Referee had made an obvious error in sending off MLS for the challenge that he had made." "MLS had stepped across his opponent and tripped him up, possibly deliberately, but in doing so he had obviously not endangered the safety of his opponent or used excessive force or brutality, nor had he 'lunged' in at his opponent."

Arsenal made the trip to Spain on 29 January for the final Champions League league-phase game against La Liga side Girona. Arteta handed a belated debut to summer loan signing Neto, who at 35 years and 194 days became Arsenal's oldest debutant since 1915; while Gabriel Magalhães made his 200th senior appearance for the Gunners. Arnaut Danjuma opened the scoring for the hosts in the 28th minute. Jorginho equalised with a spot-kick on 38 minutes. Nwaneri put Arsenal ahead with a curling effort four minutes later, becoming the second-youngest Englishman to score a Champions League goal. Girona thought they had drawn level through Cristhian Stuani in the 77th minute, only for VAR to intervene for offside in the build-up. In stoppage time Sterling saw his penalty saved by Girona goalkeeper. The 2–1 victory meant that the Gunners had secured consecutive away wins in the competition for the first time since December 2016. Arteta's side finished third in the Champions League league phase and bypassed February's play-off round to go straight to the last 16.

==== First-team transfers (winter transfer window) ====
The Premier League winter transfer window ran from 1 January to 3 February 2025.

On 9 January, Arsenal announced that Brazilian forward Marquinhos had joined Série A side Cruzeiro on loan until December 2025.

The club did not sign any player in the winter transfer window. After the transfer window closed, there were twenty-two players in the first-team squad: two goalkeepers, nine defenders, five midfielders, and six forwards. Six other first-team players were out on loan.

=== February ===

Starting XI (4–3–3) for Premier League home match against Manchester City on 2 February

The Gunners played at home against 4th-placed Manchester City on 2 February. Ødegaard put Arsenal ahead in the 2nd minute with a tap-in following a Havertz pass. Raya made two vital saves to keep out Joško Gvardiol's close-range header and Savinho's low strike in the first half. City drew level on 55 minutes through Erling Haaland, but the hosts retook the lead just a minute later through Partey's deflected strike from outside the box. In the 62nd minute, 18-year-old Lewis-Skelly took a pass from Rice and curled a right-footed shot beyond visiting goalkeeper Stefan Ortega for his first senior goal. Havertz then made it four after a swift counter-attack on 76 minutes. In stoppage time Rice launched a long pass from the left flank to 17-year-old Nwaneri, who cut inside from the right and fired a long-range curling effort around Ortega into the bottom corner. This was the first time Arsenal had had two teenagers scoring for the club in the same league game since 1986. The 5–1 victory was the Gunners' biggest win over Manchester City since 2003, and their biggest-ever win over the reigning Premier League champions in their history. Arteta became the third manager to go five games unbeaten in all competitions against City boss Pep Guardiola, after Thomas Tuchel and Jürgen Klopp. The result saw Arsenal extend their unbeaten run to 14 consecutive Premier League games for the first time under Arteta.

Arsenal travelled to Newcastle United for the second leg of their EFL Cup semi-final on 5 February. Goals from Jacob Murphy and Anthony Gordon either side of half-time knocked the Gunners out of the competition with an aggregate scoreline of 4–0. The game also saw Martinelli limp off the pitch with a hamstring injury on 37 minutes. It was later reported that he would be sidelined for more than a month.

On 6 February, the squad travelled to Dubai, United Arab Emirates for a warm-weather training camp. They flew back to England on 11 February.

Ten days after the winter transfer window closed, the club confirmed on 13 February that Havertz had sustained a hamstring injury during their training camp in Dubai and was set for surgery. With Gabriel Jesus, Martinelli and Saka already sidelined through injury, Havertz's absence left Arteta with just two first-team forwards to choose from up front in Sterling and Trossard.

The Gunners returned to action with a game against 17th-placed Leicester City away on 15 February. With the score standing at 0–0 in the 69th minute, Arteta brought on midfielder Merino as a makeshift striker. The Spaniard broke the deadlock on 81 minutes when he headed home a cross from Nwaneri, who became the youngest Arsenal player to assist a Premier League goal since 2008. Six minutes later, Merino netted his second of the afternoon at the back post to seal the win, becoming the first Arsenal player to score twice as a substitute in a Premier League away game since 2018.

On 19 February, the club confirmed that Tomiyasu had undergone surgery to his right knee and would be out until the end of 2025.

Arsenal suffered their first home defeat of the Premier League season with a 1–0 loss to 16th-placed West Ham United on 22 February. Jarrod Bowen scored the decisive goal on 44 minutes following a swift counter-attack, helping his side secure back-to-back wins at Emirates Stadium. In the 73rd minute, substitute Lewis-Skelly had a yellow card upgraded to a red for denying a goalscoring opportunity on the halfway line following a VAR check. The result ended the Gunners' 15-game unbeaten run in the Premier League.

The Gunners faced 3rd-placed Nottingham Forest away on 26 February. Neither side could find the breakthrough and the match finished 0–0. It was the first time since May 2023 that Arsenal had failed to score in back-to-back Premier League games.

=== March ===

Starting XI (4–3–3) for Champions League away match against PSV Eindhoven on 4 March

On 4 March, Arteta's men travelled to the Netherlands to face the previous season's Eredivisie champions PSV Eindhoven in the Champions League last-16 first leg. The game saw Arsenal break numerous club and competition records. Through Lewis-Skelly and Nwaneri the Gunners started a Champions League knockout match with two teenagers for the first time since March 2007 versus PSV, and Nwaneri became the second-youngest Arsenal player to make a Champions League knockout appearance. Dutchman Timber opened the scoring for the visitors in the 18th minute. Nwaneri doubled the lead on 21 minutes, becoming the third-youngest player to net a knockout stage goal in the competition. Makeshift striker Merino put the Gunners 3–0 up in the 31st minute. Noa Lang pulled one back for the hosts from the spot just before half-time. Courtesy of quickfire strikes from Ødegaard and Trossard, Arsenal reached the five-goal mark on 48 minutes, the earliest by any away side ever in a Champions League knockout game. Ødegaard added his second and the Gunners' sixth in the 73rd minute. Substitute Calafiori completed the rout on 85 minutes. This was the first time Arsenal had hit seven in the Champions League since October 2007 versus Slavia Prague. The 7–1 triumph over PSV was Arsenal's first Champions League knockout win in a decade, and their first win on Dutch soil for 17 years. In fact, it was the Gunners' biggest away win in the competition, while they became the first team in Champions League history to score seven or more goals away from home in a knockout game. Arsenal also became the first side to have six different scorers (excluding own goals) in an away knockout match in the competition. The result meant that they had won five consecutive Champions League games in a single edition of the competition for the first time since 2005–06.

Arsenal faced 14th-placed Manchester United away on 9 March. They went behind on the stroke of half-time when Bruno Fernandes curled a 25-yard free-kick past a badly positioned Raya in goal. It was later revealed by broadcaster Sky Sports that referee Anthony Taylor marched the Arsenal defensive line 11.2 yards back, further than the minimum 10 yards required in the IFAB Laws of the Game, before Fernandes played the ball over the Arsenal wall inside the near post. In the second half, Rice scored an equaliser and then made a last-ditch tackle to deny Rasmus Højlund, before Raya's double save in the final seconds – which would later win March 2025's Premier League Save of the Month award – kept the match level. The 1–1 draw marked Arteta's 200th Premier League match in charge. The Spaniard had won 118 times in his first 200 top-flight games as Gunners boss, eight more wins than Arsène Wenger had achieved at the same milestone (110).

Arsenal hosted PSV Eindhoven in the second leg of the Champions League round of 16 on 12 March. With his side leading 7–1 from the first leg, Arteta took the opportunity to name a much-changed XI which included Zinchenko in midfield and Tierney on the left wing. Goals from Zinchenko and Rice put the Gunners ahead on two occasions but the visitors levelled up twice, and the game ended 2–2. After completing a 9–3 aggregate win over PSV, Arsenal booked their place in the Champions League quarter-finals. This was the first time since 2010 that they had clinched successive last-eight appearances in the competition.

Ahead of the last international break of the season, the Gunners hosted 4th-placed Chelsea on 16 March. Merino netted the only goal of the game with a header from Ødegaard's corner, helping his side end a three-game winless run in the Premier League.

Fourteen Arsenal players (excluding loaned out players) were named in their respective countries' senior squads for international fixtures in March: Trossard (Belgium), Gabriel Magalhães (Brazil), Lewis-Skelly and Rice (England), Saliba (France), Partey (Ghana), Calafiori (Italy), Timber (Netherlands), Ødegaard (as Norway's captain), Kiwior (Poland), Tierney (Scotland), Merino and Raya (Spain), and Zinchenko (Ukraine). This was the first time for Lewis-Skelly to be called up to the England senior team. Aged 18 years and 176 days, he became England's youngest debutant scorer during a 2026 World Cup qualifier victory over Albania on 21 March.

=== April ===
Arteta's side played at home against 8th-placed Fulham on 1 April. They lost Gabriel Magalhães to injury early on but went ahead through makeshift striker Merino. This was the Spaniard's sixth Premier League goal for the Gunners this season, his most in a single campaign in his league career. Second-half substitute Saka marked his return from a three-month injury lay-off by heading in an acrobatic flick from Martinelli at the back post. Rodrigo Muniz scored a late consolation goal for Fulham. Two days later, Arsenal confirmed that Gabriel Magalhães had sustained a hamstring injury which would require surgery and rule him out of the rest of the season.

The Gunners headed to Goodison Park for the 113th and final time to take on 15th-placed Everton on 5 April. Trossard opened the scoring for the visitors from a counter-attack on 34 minutes. Everton were awarded a controversial penalty by referee Darren England early in the second half when Lewis-Skelly was adjudged to have fouled Jack Harrison, and Iliman Ndiaye then sent Raya the wrong way from 12 yards. The game ended 1–1.

Starting XI (4–3–3) for Champions League home match against Real Madrid on 8 April

Arsenal hosted 15-time and reigning European champions Real Madrid in the Champions League quarter-final first leg on 8 April. Lewis-Skelly was named in the starting line-up, becoming the second youngest English player to start a Champions League quarter-final. After a goalless first half in which Raya saved a one-on-one chance from Kylian Mbappé, Rice broke the deadlock on 58 minutes when he curled a strike around the Real Madrid wall and just inside visiting goalkeeper Thibaut Courtois' left-hand post. This was the first direct free-kick goal of his senior career, making him the fourth Arsenal player to score from a direct free-kick in the Champions League. Rice netted his second of the night with another free-kick in the 70th minute, as he bent an effort past the outstretched Courtois and into the top right corner. In doing so, he became the fifth player in Champions League history to score two direct free-kick goals in the same game, and the first to score two in a Champions League knockout match. Merino added a third five minutes later, sweeping in a first-time curling strike into the bottom left corner from a Lewis-Skelly pass. In stoppage time, Real Madrid midfielder Eduardo Camavinga was sent off after receiving a second yellow card. The win gave Arteta's side a three-goal advantage heading to the second leg in Madrid the next week. The victory also meant that England had secured a top-two spot in UEFA's association club coefficient rankings, which would bring a fifth Champions League spot for the Premier League in the 2025–26 season.

It was reported on 9 April that Arteta's backroom staff – including assistant coaches Albert Stuivenberg, Carlos Cuesta, Nicolas Jover, Miguel Molina and goalkeeping coach Iñaki Caña – had all penned new contracts with the club, which would keep them at Emirates Stadium until 2027.

The Gunners played at home against 12th-placed Brentford on 12 April. After a scoreless first half that saw Tierney had a goal ruled out by the new semi-automated offside technology, Arteta's side took the lead with a counter-attacking goal finished off by Partey. But the visitors levelled through Yoane Wissa later. Arsenal failed to find a winner, and they were forced to finish the game with ten men as Jorginho hobbled off injured after they had used all their five substitutions.

On 16 April, Arteta's men travelled to Real Madrid for the second leg of their Champions League quarter-final. In the 11th minute Arsenal were awarded a penalty, after the VAR spotted Real defender Raúl Asencio had hauled down Merino from a corner. But Saka's attempted Panenka was clawed away by goalkeeper Thibaut Courtois. In the 23rd minute the hosts were given a spot kick of their own, after Rice was adjudged to have pulled down Kylian Mbappé in the box. The decision was overturned following another VAR intervention. Saka redeemed himself on 65 minutes as he broke the offside trap to collect Merino's through ball and chipped over Courtois. Real hit back just two minutes later when a mistake from Saliba gifted Vinícius Júnior with an open goal to score. In stoppage time, Merino sent Martinelli through on goal from the halfway line, and the Brazilian slotted the ball past Courtois to seal a 2–1 win for Arsenal. The result meant that Arteta's side completed a 5–1 aggregate triumph over Real Madrid, who had still yet to beat the Gunners in four European encounters. This was the second time Arsenal had eliminated the reigning Champions League champions, after previously doing so versus AC Milan in 2007–08. The result also meant that the Gunners qualified the Champions League semi-finals for the third time in their history, after 2005–06 and 2008–09; and Arteta became the 10th different Spanish manager to reach a Champions League semi-final.

Arsenal faced 18th-placed Ipswich Town away on 20 April. Trossard gave them an early lead with their 100th goal of the campaign in all competitions. In the 28th minute, Saka raced down the right and sent the ball across the Ipswich box, with Merino backheeling into the path of Martinelli to tap in his 50th goal for the Gunners. The hosts were reduced to 10 men on 32 minutes as left-back Leif Davis was shown a straight red card for raking his studs down Saka's right Achilles tendon. In the second half, Trossard added a third to complete a brace. Substitute Nwaneri netted the fourth goal via a double deflection. The 4–0 win meant that Arsenal were unbeaten in their last 12 Premier League away matches, their longest run within a single season since 2008–09.

Arteta's side played at home against 12th-placed Crystal Palace on 23 April. The Gunners took the lead through Kiwior's header. Eberechi Eze levelled for the visitors with a volley from a corner. Trossard restored Arsenal's advantage before the break. The hosts thought they had a third goal through Martinelli in the second half, but it was ruled out after a VAR review. On the other end, Jean-Philippe Mateta capitalised on Saliba's poor pass and scored a late equaliser for the Eagles. It was Arsenal's ninth draw in a Premier League game where they had been leading in this season.

The Gunners hosted the newly minted French champions Paris Saint-Germain in the Champions League semi-final first leg on 29 April. The French side dominated the opening stages and went ahead through Ousmane Dembélé in the 4th minute. Merino headed in Rice's free-kick on 47 minutes, but the Spaniard was adjudged to have been offside following a lengthy VAR check. Nwaneri came off the bench to replace Ødegaard in the 90th minute, becoming the youngest English player to make a Champions League semi-final appearance. The 1–0 defeat saw Arsenal's 17 European game unbeaten run at home come to an end.

=== May ===
Arsenal suffered their second home defeat of the Premier League campaign with a 2–1 loss to 10th-placed Bournemouth on 3 May. Rice marked his 100th appearance for the Gunners with the opener in the 34th minute. Dean Huijsen's header from a long throw brought Bournemouth level on 67 minutes. Evanilson completed the turn around with a 75th-minute goal at the far post from a corner, after a lengthy VAR review determined that there was no conclusive evidence he had handled the ball. The result meant that Arsenal had dropped 21 points from winning positions in the Premier League this season.

On 7 May, Arteta's side travelled to Paris Saint-Germain for the second leg of their Champions League semi-final. Despite going close early on through Rice, Martinelli and Ødegaard, the Gunners fell behind on 27 minutes when Fabián Ruiz's shot deflected off Saliba into the net. The hosts were awarded a spot kick following a VAR check for a handball by Lewis-Skelly, but Raya dived to his left to save Vitinha's 69th-minute penalty. In the 72nd minute Achraf Hakimi curled home to double PSG's lead. Saka pulled a goal back on 76 minutes, but then blew a golden chance to draw level by shooting over an open goal from six yards shortly after. Arsenal had many opportunities to score during the game, but only managed to find the net once. In fact, they created more than 3.0 expected goals (xG) from 19 shots throughout the 90 minutes. The 2–1 defeat meant that the Gunners were eliminated from the Champions League at the semi-final stage with an aggregate scoreline of 3–1. This was the fourth time since 2021 that Arsenal had failed to progress past major cup semi-finals, after 2020–21 Europa League, 2021–22 EFL Cup and 2024–25 EFL Cup; and was their longest-ever run of exits at this stage.

The Gunners headed to Liverpool to take on the newly crowned Premier League champions on 11 May. They gave Liverpool a guard of honour before kick-off. The hosts went 2–0 up in the first half through two quickfire goals from Cody Gakpo and Luis Díaz. Arteta's side battled back after the break thanks to headers from Martinelli and Merino, who was sent off for a second bookable offence later. The game ended 2–2. This was the first time since March 2021 that Arsenal had avoided defeat after being at least two goals down at half-time in a Premier League match.

Starting XI (4–3–3) for Premier League home match against Newcastle United on 18 May

In their final home game of the season, Arteta's side faced 3rd-placed Newcastle United on 18 May. Goalkeeper Raya produced a man of the match display with several crucial saves, helping Arsenal win 1–0 and recording his 13th clean sheet of the Premier League campaign. Rice struck the winner on 55 minutes with a first-time finish after being picked out by Ødegaard. The game also saw the return from injury of Havertz, who came on as a replacement for Saka in the 76th minute. The result ended the Gunners' five-match winless run in all competitions, and ensured they qualified for next season's Champions League.

On 21 May, the club confirmed that Timber had undergone ankle surgery the day prior while Saliba had injured a hamstring against Newcastle. They both would be out for a few weeks.

Arsenal's 58th and final game of the campaign was against 20th-placed Southampton on the road on 25 May. Arteta watched the game from the stands as he served a one-match touchline ban. Rice became the 50th different player to start a Premier League game as captain for the Gunners. Tierney opened the scoring on 43 minutes with a near-post finish. In the 56th minute, Ross Stewart netted a header from a corner to draw the hosts level. The goal meant that Arsenal had conceded 22 times from set pieces in all competitions this season. Despite conceding, Raya won the Premier League Golden Glove for the second consecutive season, sharing the award with Nottingham Forest goalkeeper Matz Sels who also had 13 clean sheets this campaign. Substitute Ødegaard rifled home from distance on 90 minutes, helping the Gunners win 2–1. This was the 14th straight victory for Arsenal on the final day, breaking the record for the most consecutive top-flight season-enders won in English league history, which had stood for 101 years. The result confirmed the Gunners' third straight second-place finish, marking the fifth time in English top-flight history that a team had been runners-up three years in a row, with Arsenal the first side to do so twice (also between 1998–99 and 2000–01). Arsenal didn't concede more than twice in any of their 58 games in all competitions this campaign, becoming the third Premier League side to have gone through an entire season without conceding three or more goals in a match.

=== June ===
Eleven Arsenal players (excluding loaned out players) were named in their respective countries' senior squads for international fixtures in June: Trossard (Belgium), Martinelli (Brazil), Lewis-Skelly, Rice and Saka (England), Ødegaard (as Norway's captain), Kiwior (Poland), Tierney (Scotland), Merino and Raya (Spain) and Zinchenko (Ukraine).

== First team ==
=== First-team coaching staff ===
Note: Age as of 30 June 2025.

Position	Name	Nationality	Date of birth (age)	Appointed on	Last club/team	Ref.
Manager	Mikel Arteta	Spain	26 Mar 1982 (aged 43)	20 Dec 2019	(England) Manchester City (as assistant coach)	
Assistant coaches	Albert Stuivenberg	Netherlands	5 Aug 1970 (aged 54)	24 Dec 2019	Wales (as assistant manager)	
Assistant coaches	Carlos Cuesta	Spain	29 Jul 1995 (aged 29)	28 Aug 2020	(Italy) Juventus	
Assistant coaches	Miguel Molina	Spain	3 Jan 1993 (aged 32)	28 Aug 2020	(Spain) Atlético Madrid	
Set-piece coach	Nicolas Jover	France	28 Oct 1981 (aged 43)	5 Jul 2021	(England) Manchester City (as set-piece coach)	
Goalkeeping coach	Iñaki Caña	Spain	19 Sep 1975 (aged 49)	24 Dec 2019	(England) Brentford	

=== First-team squad ===
There were twenty-two players in the first-team squad: two goalkeepers, nine defenders, five midfielders, and six forwards. Six other first-team players were out on loan.

Notes:

- Squad numbers last updated on 4 February 2025. Age as of 30 June 2025.
- Flags indicate national team as defined under FIFA eligibility rules. Players may change their FIFA nationalities after the 2024–25 season, and may hold more than one non-FIFA nationality.
- Player^{*} – Player who joined Arsenal permanently or on loan during the season.
- Player^{†} – Player who departed Arsenal permanently or on loan during the season.
- Player (HG) – Player who fulfils the Premier League's "Home Grown Player" criteria.
- Player (CT) – Player who fulfils UEFA's "club-trained player" criteria.
- Player (AT) – Player who fulfils UEFA's "association-trained player" criteria.

No.	Player	Nat.	Position(s) (Footed)	Date of birth (age)	Height	Date signed	Signed from	Transfer fee	Contract ends	Ref.
Goalkeepers
22	David Raya^{*} (HG, AT) (Note: Raya graduated from Blackburn Rovers' academy.)	ESP	GK (R)	15 Sep 1995 (aged 29)	1.83 m (6 ft 0 in)	15 Aug 2023 (loan); 4 Jul 2024	(England) Brentford	£3.0m (loan) £27.0m	2028	
32	Neto^{*}	BRA	GK (R)	19 Jul 1989 (aged 35)	1.90 m (6 ft 3 in)	30 Aug 2024 (loan)	(England) Bournemouth	Undisclosed (loan)	2025	
Defenders
2	William Saliba (HG, CT)	FRA	CB (R)	24 Mar 2001 (aged 24)	1.92 m (6 ft 4 in)	25 Jul 2019	(France) Saint-Étienne	£27.0m	2027	
3	Kieran Tierney	SCO	LB / LWB / LW / CB (L)	5 Jun 1997 (aged 28)	1.78 m (5 ft 10 in)	8 Aug 2019	(Scotland) Celtic	£25.0m	2026	
4	Ben White (HG, AT) (Note: White graduated from Brighton & Hove Albion's academy.)	ENG	RB (Note: Calafiori, Partey, Timber and White can play as inverted right-backs.) / CB (R)	8 Oct 1997 (aged 27)	1.86 m (6 ft 1 in)	30 Jul 2021	(England) Brighton & Hove Albion	£50.0m	2028	
6	Gabriel Magalhães	BRA	CB (L)	19 Dec 1997 (aged 27)	1.90 m (6 ft 3 in)	1 Sep 2020	(France) Lille	£23.1m	2027	
12	Jurriën Timber	NED	RB / LB (Note: Calafiori, Kiwior, Timber, Tomiyasu and Zinchenko can play as inverted left-backs.) / CB (R)	17 Jun 2001 (aged 24)	1.79 m (5 ft 10 in)	14 Jul 2023	(Netherlands) Ajax	£34.3m (initial fee)	2028	
15	Jakub Kiwior	POL	CB / LB (L)	15 Feb 2000 (aged 25)	1.89 m (6 ft 2 in)	23 Jan 2023	(Italy) Spezia	£17.6m	2027+1	
17	Oleksandr Zinchenko	UKR	LB / CM (L)	15 Dec 1996 (aged 28)	1.75 m (5 ft 9 in)	22 Jul 2022	(England) Manchester City	£30.0m (initial fee)	2026	
18	Takehiro Tomiyasu	JPN	RB / LB / CB (R)	5 Nov 1998 (aged 26)	1.87 m (6 ft 2 in)	31 Aug 2021	(Italy) Bologna	£16.0m	2026+1	
33	Riccardo Calafiori^{*}	ITA	LB / CB / RB (L)	19 May 2002 (aged 23)	1.88 m (6 ft 2 in)	29 Jul 2024	(Italy) Bologna	£33.6m (initial fee)	2029	
Midfielders
5	Thomas Partey	GHA	DM / CM / RB (R)	13 Jun 1993 (aged 32)	1.85 m (6 ft 1 in)	5 Oct 2020	(Spain) Atlético Madrid	£45.3m (release clause)	2025	
8	Martin Ødegaard (captain)	NOR	AM / CM (L)	17 Dec 1998 (aged 26)	1.78 m (5 ft 10 in)	27 Jan 2021 (loan); 20 Aug 2021	(Spain) Real Madrid	£1.8m (loan) £30.0m	2028	
20	Jorginho	ITA	DM / CM (R)	20 Dec 1991 (aged 33)	1.80 m (5 ft 11 in)	31 Jan 2023	(England) Chelsea	£12.0m	2025	
23	Mikel Merino^{*}	ESP	CM / AM / ST (L)	22 Jun 1996 (aged 29)	1.89 m (6 ft 2 in)	27 Aug 2024	(Spain) Real Sociedad	£27.4m (initial fee)	2028+1	
41	Declan Rice (HG, AT) (Note: Rice graduated from West Ham United's academy.)	ENG	CM / DM / CB (R)	14 Jan 1999 (aged 26)	1.88 m (6 ft 2 in)	15 Jul 2023	(England) West Ham United	£100.0m (initial fee)	2028+1	
Forwards
7	Bukayo Saka (Vice-captain) (HG, CT)	ENG	RW / LB (L)	5 Sep 2001 (aged 23)	1.78 m (5 ft 10 in)	14 Sep 2018	(England) Arsenal Academy	N/A	2027	
9	Gabriel Jesus	BRA	ST / LW / RW (R)	3 Apr 1997 (aged 28)	1.75 m (5 ft 9 in)	4 Jul 2022	(England) Manchester City	£45.0m	2027	
11	Gabriel Martinelli (HG, CT)	BRA	LW / ST / RW (R)	18 Jun 2001 (aged 24)	1.78 m (5 ft 10 in)	2 Jul 2019	(Brazil) Ituano	£6.0m	2027+1	
19	Leandro Trossard	BEL	LW / ST / AM (R)	4 Dec 1994 (aged 30)	1.72 m (5 ft 8 in)	20 Jan 2023	(England) Brighton & Hove Albion	£21.0m (initial fee)	2027+1	
29	Kai Havertz	GER	ST / AM (L)	11 Jun 1999 (aged 26)	1.93 m (6 ft 4 in)	28 Jun 2023	(England) Chelsea	£62.0m (initial fee)	2028	
30	Raheem Sterling^{*} (HG, AT) (Note: Sterling graduated from Liverpool's academy.)	ENG	RW / LW / ST (R)	8 Dec 1994 (aged 30)	1.72 m (5 ft 8 in)	31 Aug 2024 (loan)	(England) Chelsea	Free (loan)	2025	
Out on loan
21	Fábio Vieira^{†}	POR	AM / RW (L)	30 May 2000 (aged 25)	1.70 m (5 ft 7 in)	21 Jun 2022	(Portugal) Porto	£29.9m (initial fee)	2027	
24	Reiss Nelson^{†} (HG, CT)	ENG	RW / LW (R)	10 Dec 1999 (aged 25)	1.75 m (5 ft 9 in)	23 Dec 2016	(England) Arsenal Academy	N/A	2027+1	
27	Marquinhos^{†}	BRA	RW (L)	7 Apr 2003 (aged 22)	1.75 m (5 ft 9 in)	10 Jun 2022	(Brazil) São Paulo	£3.5m	2026+1	
31	Karl Hein^{†} (HG, CT)	EST	GK (R)	13 Apr 2002 (aged 23)	1.93 m (6 ft 4 in)	9 May 2019	(England) Arsenal Academy	N/A	Undisclosed	
—	Albert Sambi Lokonga^{†}	BEL	CM (R)	22 Oct 1999 (aged 25)	1.83 m (6 ft 0 in)	19 Jul 2021	(Belgium) Anderlecht	£17.2m	2026	
—	Nuno Tavares^{†}	POR	LB / LWB (L)	26 Jan 2000 (aged 25)	1.83 m (6 ft 0 in)	10 Jul 2021	(Portugal) Benfica	£8.0m	2026	

== Academy ==
=== Academy coaching staff ===
Position	Name	Nationality	Year joined	Last club/team	Ref.
Academy Manager	Per Mertesacker	Germany	2018	(England) Arsenal (as player)	
Head of Academy Coaching	Luke Hobbs	England	2013	(England) Southend United	
Under-21s Head Coach	Mehmet Ali	Turkey	2022	(England) Reading	
Under-21s Assistant Coach	Max Porter	England	2019	(England) Chelmsford City (as player)	
Under-18s Head Coach	Adam Birchall	Wales	2016	(England) Bromley (as player)	

Note: Jack Wilshere left his position of Under-18s Head Coach in October 2024.

=== Academy players ===
The following Arsenal Academy players made appearances for the club's first team during the season.

Notes:

- Squad numbers last updated on 4 February 2025. Age as of 30 June 2025.
- Flags indicate national team as defined under FIFA eligibility rules. Players may change their FIFA nationalities after the 2024–25 season, and may hold more than one non-FIFA nationality.
- Player^{*} – Player who joined Arsenal permanently or on loan during the season.
- Player^{†} – Player who departed Arsenal permanently or on loan during the season.
- Player (U21) – Player who was registered by Arsenal as an Under-21 Player on the 2024–25 Premier League Squad List.
- Player (ListA) – Player who was registered by Arsenal on the 2024–25 UEFA Champions League Squad List A.
- Player (ListB) – Player who was registered by Arsenal on the 2024–25 UEFA Champions League Squad List B.

Team	No.	Player	Nationality	Pos.	Date of birth (age)	Ref.
U21s	36	Tommy Setford^{*} (U21, ListA)	England	GK	13 Mar 2006 (aged 19)	
U21s	37	Nathan Butler-Oyedeji (U21, ListB)	England	FW	4 Jan 2003 (aged 22)	
U21s	46	Ismeal Kabia (U21, ListB)	Netherlands	FW	10 Dec 2005 (aged 19)	
U21s	47	Maldini Kacurri^{†} (U21, ListB)	Albania	DF	4 Oct 2005 (aged 19)	
U21s	49	Myles Lewis-Skelly (U21, ListB)	England	MF	26 Sep 2006 (aged 18)	
U21s	51	Josh Nichols (U21, ListB)	England	DF	26 Jul 2006 (aged 18)	
U21s	53	Ethan Nwaneri (U21, ListB)	England	MF	21 Mar 2007 (aged 18)	
U21s	76	Ayden Heaven^{†} (U21, ListB)	England	DF	22 Sep 2006 (aged 18)	
U18s	92	Jack Porter (U21, ListB)	England	GK	15 Jul 2008 (aged 16)	

== Board and management team ==
Arsenal board
Position	Name	Ref.
Co-chairman	(United States) Stan Kroenke	
Co-chairman	(United States) Josh Kroenke	
Executive vice-chairman	(England) Tim Lewis	
Director	(England) Lord Harris of Peckham	

Management team
Position	Name	Ref.
Managing Director	(England) Richard Garlick	
Sporting Director	(Italy) Andrea Berta (Note: Edu Gaspar resigned from his position as Sporting Director in November 2024. Assistant sporting director Jason Ayto stepped up on an interim basis since then. Andrea Berta joined the club as Sporting Director in March 2025.)	
Director of Football Operations	(England) James King	
Head of Sports Medicine	(England) Zafar Iqbal	

== Contracts and transfers ==
=== New contracts ===
The following Arsenal players signed their first or new professional contracts with the club.

Date	No.	Pos.	Player	Contract type	Ref.
First team
24 Jun 2024	31	GK	(Estonia) Karl Hein	Contract extension (length undisclosed)	
Academy
4 Jul 2024	39	MF	(England) Harrison Dudziak	First professional contract	
4 Jul 2024	42	FW	(England) Sebastian Ferdinand	First professional contract	
4 Jul 2024	46	FW	(Netherlands) Ismeal Kabia	First professional contract	
4 Jul 2024	47	DF	(Albania) Maldini Kacurri	First professional contract	
4 Jul 2024	48	FW	(England) Osman Kamara	First professional contract	
4 Jul 2024	51	DF	(England) Josh Nichols	First professional contract	
4 Jul 2024	55	GK	(England) Brian Okonkwo	First professional contract	
8 Jul 2024	74	DF	(Wales) Brayden Clarke	First professional contract	
16 Jul 2024	62	GK	(Colombia) Alexei Rojas	First professional contract	
16 Aug 2024	64	FW	(England) Charles Sagoe Jr	Contract extension (length undisclosed)	
17 Jan 2025	86	DF	(England) Theo Julienne	First professional contract	
14 Apr 2025	90	FW	(England) Ceadach O'Neill	First professional contract	

=== Released ===
The following players from Arsenal's first team, under-21s and under-18s squads were released by the club.

Date	No.	Pos.	Player	Subsequent club	Join date	Notes	Ref.
First team
30 Jun 2024	17	DF	(Portugal) Cédric Soares	(Brazil) São Paulo (Série A)	29 Jan 2025	End of contract	
30 Jun 2024	25	MF	(Egypt) Mohamed Elneny	(United Arab Emirates) Al Jazira (Pro League)	30 Jul 2024	End of contract	
30 Jun 2024	33	GK	(England) Arthur Okonkwo	(Wales) Wrexham (League One)	1 Jul 2024	End of contract	
Academy
30 Jun 2024	40	MF	(Portugal) Mauro Bandeira	(Slovenia) Tabor Sežana (Second League)	17 Oct 2024	End of contract	
30 Jun 2024	43	MF	(Romania) Cătălin Cîrjan	(Romania) Dinamo București (Liga I)	1 Jul 2024	End of contract	
30 Jun 2024	45	FW	(England) Amario Cozier-Duberry	(England) Brighton & Hove Albion (Premier League)	7 Jul 2024	End of contract	
30 Jun 2024	46	FW	(England) Henry Davies	Unattached in the 2024–25 season		End of contract	
30 Jun 2024	48	GK	(England) Ovie Ejeheri	(Denmark) Midtjylland (Superliga)	15 Jul 2024	End of contract	
30 Jun 2024	50	DF	(England) Taylor Foran	(England) Bromley (League Two)	12 Jul 2024	End of contract	
30 Jun 2024	52	GK	(Poland) Hubert Graczyk	(England) Manchester United (Premier League)	31 Aug 2024	End of contract	
30 Jun 2024	54	GK	(England) James Hillson	(England) Southend United (National League)	10 Aug 2024	End of contract	
30 Jun 2024	56	DF	(Northern Ireland) Henry Jeffcott	(England) Wealdstone (National League)	February 2025	End of contract	
30 Jun 2024	57	FW	(England) Tyreece John-Jules	(England) Crawley Town (League One)	18 Oct 2024	End of contract	
30 Jun 2024	58	DF	(England) Alex Kirk	(England) Sutton United (National League)	3 Oct 2024	End of contract	
30 Jun 2024	73	DF	(Wales) James Lannin-Sweet	(England) St Albans City (National League South)	14 Sep 2024	End of contract	
30 Jun 2024	74	FW	(England) Kido Taylor-Hart	(Greece) PAS Giannina (Super League 2)	12 Jan 2025	End of contract	
30 Jun 2024	76	DF	(England) Reuell Walters	(England) Luton Town (Championship)	11 Jul 2024	End of contract	
30 Jun 2024	80	FW	(Wales) Omari Benjamin	(England) Everton (Premier League)	2 Jul 2024	End of contract	
30 Jun 2024	81	DF	(England) Luis Brown	(England) West Ham United (Premier League)	5 Jul 2024	End of contract	
30 Jun 2024	82	GK	(England) Noah Cooper	(England) Stoke City (Championship)	5 Jul 2024	End of contract	
30 Jun 2024	93	FW	(England) Kamarni Ryan	(England) Burnley (Championship)	1 Jul 2024	End of contract	
30 Aug 2024	60	DF	(Tunisia) Omar Rekik	(Slovenia) Maribor (PrvaLiga)	2 Jan 2025	Contract termination	

=== Transfers in ===
The following players joined Arsenal permanently and signed professional contracts with the club.

Date	No.	Pos.	Player	Transferred from	Transfer fee	Contract ends	Ref.
First team
4 Jul 2024	22	GK	(Spain) David Raya	(England) Brentford (Premier League)	£27.0m	2028	
29 Jul 2024	33	DF	(Italy) Riccardo Calafiori	(Italy) Bologna (Serie A)	£33.6m + £8.4m	2029	
27 Aug 2024	23	MF	(Spain) Mikel Merino	(Spain) Real Sociedad (La Liga)	£27.4m + £4.2m	2028+1	
Academy
27 Jun 2024	54	GK	(Denmark) Lucas Nygaard	(Denmark) Nordsjælland (Superliga)	Free transfer	Undisclosed	
21 Jul 2024	36	GK	(England) Tommy Setford	(Netherlands) Ajax (Eredivisie)	£0.8m	2028	

Total expenditure: ▼£88.8 million (excluding potential add-ons, bonuses and undisclosed figures)

=== Transfers out ===
Date	No.	Pos.	Player	Transferred to	Transfer fee	Ref.
First team
2 Aug 2024	10	MF	(England) Emile Smith Rowe	(England) Fulham (Premier League)	£27.0m + £7.0m	
30 Aug 2024	1	GK	(England) Aaron Ramsdale	(England) Southampton (Premier League)	£18.0m + £7.0m	
30 Aug 2024	14	FW	(England) Eddie Nketiah	(England) Crystal Palace (Premier League)	£25.0m + £5.0m	
Academy
8 Jul 2024	36	FW	(Denmark) Mika Biereth	(Austria) Sturm Graz (Bundesliga)	£4.0m (Note: Arsenal inserted a sell-on clause into the deal for any future transfer Biereth makes.)	
14 Aug 2024	62	DF	(England) Brooke Norton-Cuffy	(Italy) Genoa (Serie A)	£1.7m + £1.8m (Note: Arsenal inserted a sell-on clause into the deal for any future transfer Norton-Cuffy makes.)	
26 Aug 2024	58	MF	(England) Charlie Patino	(Spain) Deportivo La Coruña (Segunda División)	£1.0m (Note: Arsenal inserted a sell-on clause into the deal for any future transfer Patino makes.)	
1 Jan 2025	61	DF	(England) Josh Robinson	(England) Wigan Athletic (League One)	Undisclosed	
1 Feb 2025	76	DF	(England) Ayden Heaven	(England) Manchester United (Premier League)	Undisclosed	
22 Feb 2025	50	DF	(England) Zane Monlouis	(Canada) Toronto (Major League Soccer)	Undisclosed	

Total income: ▲£76.7 million (excluding potential add-ons, bonuses and undisclosed figures)

=== Loans in ===
The following players joined Arsenal on loan and signed professional contracts with the club.

Date	No.	Pos.	Player	Loaned from	On loan until	Loan fee	Ref.
First team
30 Aug 2024	32	GK	(Brazil) Neto	(England) Bournemouth (Premier League)	End of season	Undisclosed	
31 Aug 2024	30	FW	(England) Raheem Sterling	(England) Chelsea (Premier League)	End of season	Free	

Total expenditure: ▼£0.0 million (excluding purchase options and additional fees)

=== Loans out ===
- Date^{‡} – Loan was originally scheduled to last to until end of the season but was curtailed.

Date	No.	Pos.	Player	Loaned to	On loan until	Loan fee	Ref.
First team
15 Feb 2024	27	FW	(Brazil) Marquinhos	(Brazil) Fluminense (Série A)	Jan 2025	Undisclosed	
15 Jul 2024	—	MF	(Belgium) Albert Sambi Lokonga	(Spain) Sevilla (La Liga)	End of season	Undisclosed (Note: Sevilla retain the option to make the loan permanent for €12.0m (£10.1m). Arsenal retain a 25% sell-on clause for any future transfer Sambi Lokonga makes if Sevilla activate the option.)	
15 Jul 2024	—	DF	(Portugal) Nuno Tavares	(Italy) Lazio (Serie A)	End of season	Undisclosed (Note: Lazio have a €9.0m (£7.6m) obligation to buy upon the completion of certain conditions. Arsenal retain a sell-on clause worth over 25% for any future transfer Tavares makes.)	
13 Aug 2024	31	GK	(Estonia) Karl Hein	(Spain) Real Valladolid (La Liga)	End of season	Undisclosed	
28 Aug 2024	21	MF	(Portugal) Fábio Vieira	(Portugal) Porto (Primeira Liga)	End of season	Undisclosed	
31 Aug 2024	24	FW	(England) Reiss Nelson	(England) Fulham (Premier League)	End of season	Undisclosed	
9 Jan 2025	27	FW	(Brazil) Marquinhos	(Brazil) Cruzeiro (Série A)	Dec 2025	Undisclosed	
Academy
17 Jul 2024	45	MF	(Republic of Ireland) Jack Henry-Francis	(Republic of Ireland) Sligo Rovers (Premier Division)	1 Nov 2024	Undisclosed	
16 Aug 2024	64	FW	(England) Charles Sagoe Jr	(England) Shrewsbury Town (League One)	6 Jan 2025^{‡}	Undisclosed	
1 Feb 2025	55	GK	(England) Brian Okonkwo	(England) Hitchin Town (Southern Premier Central Division)	End of season	Undisclosed	
3 Feb 2025	47	DF	(Albania) Maldini Kacurri	(England) Bromley (League Two)	End of season	Undisclosed	

Total income: ▲£0.0 million (excluding undisclosed figures)

=== Overall transfer activity ===
Note: All loan fees included. All potential add-ons, bonuses and undisclosed figures excluded.

Transfer window	Spending	Income	Net expenditure
Summer 2024	▼£88.8 million	▲£78.7 million (Note: Through a sell-on clause, Arsenal received 30% of the profit Cardiff City made after Mark McGuinness transferred to Luton Town (reportedly £2.0 million).)	▼£10.1 million
Winter 2025	£0.0 million	▲£2.0 million (Note: Through a sell-on clause, Arsenal received 20% of the initial transfer fee paid by Monaco to Sturm Graz for Mika Biereth (reportedly £2.0 million).)	▲£2.0 million
Total	▼£88.8 million	▲£80.7 million	▼£8.1 million

== Kits ==
Supplier: Adidas / Sponsor: Emirates / Sleeve sponsor: Visit Rwanda

Kits using Adidas's Three Stripes trademark
Home	Away	Away alt.^{1}	Away alt.^{2}	"No More Red"	GK^{1}	Goalkeeper^{1} alt.	Goalkeeper^{2}	Goalkeeper^{4}

Kits using Adidas's Trefoil trademark
Third	Third alt.	Goalkeeper^{3}	Goalkeeper^{5}

=== Kit information ===
This is Adidas's sixth year supplying Arsenal kit, having taken over from Puma at the beginning of the 2019–20 season.

- Home: The club revealed their new home kit for the 2024–25 season on 16 May 2024. The kit uses Arsenal's traditional colours of red and white. The shirt has a red body and white sleeves with blue stripes on the collar and shoulders, and is complemented by white shorts and red socks. This is the first time the club's iconic cannon has featured outside the crest on the home shirt since 1989–90. The kit was launched alongside a film named The Year of the Cannon.
- Away: On 18 July, the Gunners released their new away kit, which honours the connection between the club, north London, and Africa, recognising Arsenal's African players and supporters. The shirt has a black base with red-and-green stripes on the collar and shoulders, and is combined with black shorts and black socks. A white zig-zag graphic runs down the arms and flanks of the torso. White shorts and socks were used in some away games when there was a colour clash with the home team's kit. The kit was launched with an accompanying video named From Africa to Arsenal and back again 🌍.
- Third: The new third kit was revealed on 12 August. The shirt has an aqua blue coloured base with a lilac purple fade along the front. The collar and shoulder also contain navy blue stripes. The shirt is partnered with navy shorts and socks. Aqua socks were used in some away games when there was a colour clash with the home team's kit. The kit was launched alongside a film named Arsenal. An Original. Always. 💜💙.
- No More Red: On 10 January 2025, Arsenal announced that they would extend their "No More Red" campaign – an initiative that aims to help keep young people safe from knife crime and youth violence – for a fourth season. The all-white kit was launched alongside a film named Safe spaces. Role models. Connections.
- Goalkeeper: The new goalkeeper kits are based on Adidas's goalkeeper template for the season.

== Pre-season and friendlies ==
On 23 February 2024, Arsenal announced that they would travel to the United States in July to play friendlies against fellow Premier League sides Manchester United and Liverpool. Two home friendlies were then announced in June, versus reigning Bundesliga champions Bayer Leverkusen and Ligue 1 side Lyon. A third and final friendly in the United States was confirmed in July, against Bournemouth, another Premier League side.

24 July 2024 Friendly	Arsenal	1–1 (5–4 p)	Bournemouth	Carson, United States
19:30 PDT (03:30 BST ^{+1})	Vieira 18'; Timber (yellow card) 53'	Report	Zabarnyi (yellow card) 33'; Cook (yellow card) 69'; Semenyo 73'	Stadium: Dignity Health Sports Park; Attendance: 13,000; Referee: Brandon Stevis (United States)
	Penalties
	Ødegaard (penalty scored); Zinchenko (penalty scored); Jorginho (penalty scored); Trossard (penalty missed); Gabriel Jesus (penalty scored); Kiwior (penalty scored)		(penalty scored) Semenyo; (penalty missed) Billing; (penalty scored) Ouattara; (penalty scored) Smith; (penalty scored) Jebbison; (penalty missed) Christie

27 July 2024 Friendly	Arsenal	2–1 (3–4 p)	Manchester United	Los Angeles, United States
17:00 PDT (01:00 BST ^{+1})	Gabriel Jesus 26'; Martinelli 81'	Report	Højlund 10'	Stadium: SoFi Stadium; Attendance: 62,486; Referee: Timothy Ford (United States)
	Penalties
	Vieira (penalty scored); Havertz (penalty missed); Kiwior (penalty missed); Martinelli (penalty scored); Gabriel (penalty scored)		(penalty scored) McTominay; (penalty scored) Evans; (penalty missed) Wheatley; (penalty scored) Eriksen; (penalty scored) Sancho

31 July 2024 Friendly	Liverpool	2–1	Arsenal	Philadelphia, United States
19:30 EDT (00:30 BST ^{+1})	Salah 13'; Carvalho 34'; Endō (yellow card) 80'	Report	Havertz 40'	Stadium: Lincoln Financial Field; Attendance: 69,879; Referee: Ramy Touchan (United States)

7 August 2024 Friendly	Arsenal	4–1	Bayer Leverkusen	Holloway
18:00 BST	Zinchenko 8'; Trossard 9'; Gabriel Jesus 38'; Havertz 65'	Report	Hložek 76'; Puerta (yellow card) 89'	Stadium: Emirates Stadium; Attendance: 50,000; Referee: Sam Barrott (England)

11 August 2024 Emirates Cup	Arsenal	2–0	Lyon	Holloway
14:00 BST	Saliba 9'; Gabriel 27'	Report		Stadium: Emirates Stadium; Attendance: 60,000; Referee: Craig Pawson (England)

== Competitions ==
=== Overall record ===
Competition	First match	Last match	Starting round	Final position	Record							
Competition	First match	Last match	Starting round	Final position	Pld	W	D	L	GF	GA	GD	Win %
Premier League	17 August 2024	25 May 2025	Matchday 1	2nd	38	20	14	4	69	34	+35	52.63
FA Cup	12 January 2025		Third round	Third round	1	0	1	0	1	1	+0	0.00
EFL Cup	25 September 2024	5 February 2025	Third round	Semi-finals	5	3	0	2	11	7	+4	60.00
UEFA Champions League	19 September 2024	7 May 2025	League phase	Semi-finals	14	9	2	3	31	10	+21	64.29
Total					58	32	17	9	112	52	+60	55.17

Source: Soccerway

=== Premier League ===
Arsenal won twenty Premier League games in 2024–25, which was eight less than the previous campaign. They dropped 21 points from winning positions in the competition this season, their joint-worst record in a single campaign (also 21 in 2019–20).

The Gunners lost four Premier League matches this campaign – one less than the previous season. That represented their lowest loss total in a top-flight campaign since 2007–08 when they were beaten three times.

For a second consecutive season, Arsenal held the division's best defensive record, conceding a league-low 34 times.

Arsenal accumulated six red cards during the Premier League season, the highest total of any club, which disrupted match control in several games and contributed to dropped points.

==== League table ====
Pos	Team	Pld	W	D	L	GF	GA	GD	Pts	Qualification or relegation
1	Liverpool (C)	38	25	9	4	86	41	+45	84	Qualification for the Champions League league phase (Note: The Premier League gained an additional Champions League place as a result of England gaining one of the two European Performance Spots (EPS) awarded to the two associations with the highest UEFA coefficient points in 2024–25.)
2	Arsenal	38	20	14	4	69	34	+35	74	Qualification for the Champions League league phase
3	Manchester City	38	21	8	9	72	44	+28	71	Qualification for the Champions League league phase
4	Chelsea	38	20	9	9	64	43	+21	69	Qualification for the Champions League league phase
5	Newcastle United	38	20	6	12	68	47	+21	66	Qualification for the Champions League league phase

Source: Premier League
Rules for classification: 1) Points; 2) Goal difference; 3) Goals scored; 4) If the champions, relegated teams or qualified teams for UEFA competitions cannot be determined by rules 1 to 3, rules 4.1 to 4.3 are applied – 4.1) Points gained in head-to-head record between such teams; 4.2) Away goals scored in head-to-head record between such teams; 4.3) Play-offs
(C) Champions

==== Results summary ====
Overall								Home						Away					
Pld	W	D	L	GF	GA	GD	Pts	W	D	L	GF	GA	GD	W	D	L	GF	GA	GD
38	20	14	4	69	34	+35	74	11	6	2	35	17	+18	9	8	2	34	17	+17

Source: Premier League

==== Results by round ====
Round	1	2	3	4	5	6	7	8	9	10	11	12	13	14	15	16	17	18	19	20	21	22	23	24	25	26	27	28	29	30	31	32	33	34	35	36	37	38
Ground	H	A	H	A	A	H	H	A	H	A	A	H	A	H	A	H	A	H	A	A	H	H	A	H	A	H	A	A	H	H	A	H	A	H	H	A	H	A
Result	W	W	D	W	D	W	W	L	D	L	D	W	W	W	D	D	W	W	W	D	W	D	W	W	W	L	D	D	W	W	D	D	W	D	L	D	W	W
Position	2	3	4	2	4	3	3	3	3	5	4	4	2	3	3	3	3	2	2	2	2	2	2	2	2	2	2	2	2	2	2	2	2	2	2	2	2	2
Points	3	6	7	10	11	14	17	17	18	18	19	22	25	28	29	30	33	36	39	40	43	44	47	50	53	53	54	55	58	61	62	63	66	67	67	68	71	74

Source: Premier League
A = Away; H = Home; W = Win; D = Draw; L = Loss; P = Postponed
Notes:
- Positions show the situation at the end of the corresponding Game Weeks (GW), not the position at the conclusion of matches or game days.

==== Matches ====
The league fixtures were announced on 18 June 2024. A selection of fixtures were rescheduled for live TV coverage in the UK, or due to clashing with domestic or European cup competitions.

Between 10 November 2024 and 15 February 2025, Arsenal were unbeaten in 15 league games, winning 10 of those. It was their longest run since they went 16 games without a defeat in the 2010–11 campaign when Arsène Wenger was in charge.

By beating Southampton on the final day, the Gunners extended their unbeaten away run to 14 league matches. This was their longest stretch without defeat on the road since going 27 matches between April 2003 and September 2004.

This was the first season that Arsenal had not been awarded a penalty at Emirates Stadium in the Premier League since 2015–16.

17 August 2024 1	Arsenal	2–0	Wolverhampton Wanderers	Holloway
15:00 BST	Havertz 25'; Saka (yellow card) 60', (goal) 74'; Gabriel Jesus (yellow card) 88'	Report	Gomes (yellow card) 23'; Toti (yellow card) 38'	Stadium: Emirates Stadium; Attendance: 60,261; Referee: Jarred Gillett

24 August 2024 2	Aston Villa	0–2	Arsenal	Birmingham
17:30 BST	Onana (yellow card) 72'	Report	Rice (yellow card) 45+3'; Gabriel (yellow card) 57'; Trossard 67'; Partey 77'; Ødegaard (yellow card) 89'	Stadium: Villa Park; Attendance: 41,587; Referee: Michael Oliver

31 August 2024 3	Arsenal	1–1	Brighton & Hove Albion	Holloway
12:30 BST	Havertz 38'; Rice (yellow card) 42' (yellow-red card) 49'; Partey (yellow card) 45+4'; Timber (yellow card) 70'; Raya (yellow card) 90+4'	Report	João Pedro 58', (yellow card) 90+6'; Minteh (yellow card) 70'	Stadium: Emirates Stadium; Attendance: 60,326; Referee: Chris Kavanagh

15 September 2024 4	Tottenham Hotspur	0–1	Arsenal	Tottenham
14:00 BST	Udogie (yellow card) 27'; Bentancur (yellow card) 32'; Vicario (yellow card) 37'; Van de Ven (yellow card) 45+2'; Kulusevski (yellow card) 45+2'	Report	Saliba (yellow card) 15'; Timber (yellow card) 35'; Jorginho (yellow card) 49'; Gabriel 64'	Stadium: Tottenham Hotspur Stadium; Attendance: 61,645; Referee: Jarred Gillett

22 September 2024 5	Manchester City	2–2	Arsenal	Manchester
16:30 BST	Haaland 9'; Ederson (yellow card) 22'; Dias (yellow card) 45+1'; Silva (yellow card) 90+1'; Stones 90+8'	Report	Calafiori 22'; Trossard (yellow card) 34' (yellow-red card) 45+8'; Gabriel 45+1'; Partey (yellow card) 45+7'; Lewis-Skelly (yellow card) 65'; Rice (yellow card) 83'; Gabriel Jesus (yellow card) 90+6'	Stadium: City of Manchester Stadium; Attendance: 52,846; Referee: Michael Oliver

28 September 2024 6	Arsenal	4–2	Leicester City	Holloway
15:00 BST	Martinelli 20'; Trossard 45+1'; Saliba (yellow card) 46'; Calafiori (yellow card) 49'; Ndidi 90+4' (o.g.); Havertz 90+9'	Report	Vardy (yellow card) 20'; Ndidi (yellow card) 31'; Justin 47', 63'; Skipp (yellow card) 50'; Buonanotte (yellow card) 70'	Stadium: Emirates Stadium; Attendance: 60,323; Referee: Sam Barrott

5 October 2024 7	Arsenal	3–1	Southampton	Holloway
15:00 BST	Havertz 58'; Martinelli 68'; Saka 88'	Report	Walker-Peters (yellow card) 23'; Bednarek (yellow card) 34'; Dibling (yellow card) 38'; Archer 55'	Stadium: Emirates Stadium; Attendance: 60,307; Referee: Tony Harrington

19 October 2024 8	Bournemouth	2–0	Arsenal	Bournemouth
17:30 BST	Semenyo (yellow card) 62'; Christie 70'; Kluivert 79' (pen.)	Report	Saliba (red card) 30'; White (yellow card) 68'	Stadium: Dean Court; Attendance: 11,235; Referee: Robert Jones

27 October 2024 9	Arsenal	2–2	Liverpool	Holloway
16:30 GMT	Saka 9'; Merino 43'; Raya (yellow card) 66'; Gabriel Jesus (yellow card) 90+8'	Report	Van Dijk 18'; Mac Allister (yellow card) 33'; Salah 81'; Núñez (yellow card) 90+4'	Stadium: Emirates Stadium; Attendance: 60,383; Referee: Anthony Taylor

2 November 2024 10	Newcastle United	1–0	Arsenal	Newcastle upon Tyne
12:30 GMT	Isak 12'; Schär (yellow card) 39'; Willock (yellow card) 62'; Tonali (yellow card) 71'; Pope (yellow card) 90+4'	Report	Merino (yellow card) 56'; Timber (yellow card) 66'; Jorginho (yellow card) 88'; Havertz (yellow card) 90+7'	Stadium: St James' Park; Attendance: 52,249; Referee: John Brooks

10 November 2024 11	Chelsea	1–1	Arsenal	Fulham
16:30 GMT	Colwill (yellow card) 21'; Neto (yellow card) 32', (goal) 70'; Madueke (yellow card) 45+1'; Cucurella (yellow card) 80'	Report	White (yellow card) 39'; Havertz (yellow card) 56'; Martinelli 60'	Stadium: Stamford Bridge; Attendance: 39,780; Referee: Michael Oliver

23 November 2024 12	Arsenal	3–0	Nottingham Forest	Holloway
15:00 GMT	Saka 15', (yellow card) 44'; Jorginho (yellow card) 24'; Gabriel Jesus (yellow card) 31'; Partey 52'; Nwaneri 86'	Report	Aina (yellow card) 45+5'; Yates (yellow card) 69'	Stadium: Emirates Stadium; Attendance: 60,298; Referee: Simon Hooper

30 November 2024 13	West Ham United	2–5	Arsenal	Stratford
17:30 GMT	Wan-Bissaka 38'; Emerson 40', (yellow card) 42'; Summerville (yellow card) 45+1'; Fabiański (yellow card) 45+3'; Souček (yellow card) 90+4'	Report	Gabriel 10'; Trossard 27'; Ødegaard 34' (pen.); Havertz 36'; Saka (yellow card) 42', (goal) 45+5' (pen.)	Stadium: London Stadium; Attendance: 62,475; Referee: Anthony Taylor

4 December 2024 14	Arsenal	2–0	Manchester United	Holloway
20:15 GMT	Timber 54'; Zinchenko (yellow card) 66'; Saliba 73'	Report	Malacia (yellow card) 44'; Ugarte (yellow card) 45'; Maguire (yellow card) 51'	Stadium: Emirates Stadium; Attendance: 60,256; Referee: Sam Barrott

8 December 2024 15	Fulham	1–1	Arsenal	Fulham
14:00 GMT	Jiménez 11', (yellow card) 79'; Lukić (yellow card) 50'; Bassey (yellow card) 72'; Robinson (yellow card) 85'	Report	Saliba 52'; Martinelli (yellow card) 82'; Rice (yellow card) 90+7'	Stadium: Craven Cottage; Attendance: 26,954; Referee: Chris Kavanagh

14 December 2024 16	Arsenal	0–0	Everton	Holloway
15:00 GMT		Report	Young (yellow card) 72'; Pickford (yellow card) 77'; Broja (yellow card) 81'	Stadium: Emirates Stadium; Attendance: 60,176; Referee: Craig Pawson

21 December 2024 17	Crystal Palace	1–5	Arsenal	Selhurst
17:30 GMT	Sarr 11'; Guéhi (yellow card) 64'; Clyne (yellow card) 79'	Report	Gabriel Jesus 6', 14'; Gabriel (yellow card) 31'; Timber (yellow card) 36'; Havertz 38'; Martinelli 60'; Rice 84'	Stadium: Selhurst Park; Attendance: 25,167; Referee: Simon Hooper

27 December 2024 18	Arsenal	1–0	Ipswich Town	Holloway
20:15 GMT	Havertz 23', (yellow card) 54'	Report	Davis (yellow card) 65'	Stadium: Emirates Stadium; Attendance: 60,271; Referee: Darren England

1 January 2025 19	Brentford	1–3	Arsenal	Brentford
17:30 GMT	Mbeumo 13'; Nørgaard (yellow card) 26'	Report	Timber (yellow card) 17'; Gabriel Jesus 29'; Merino 50'; Martinelli 53'; Calafiori (yellow card) 57'	Stadium: Brentford Community Stadium; Attendance: 17,190; Referee: Peter Bankes

4 January 2025 20	Brighton & Hove Albion	1–1	Arsenal	Brighton and Hove
17:30 GMT	João Pedro 61' (pen.); Veltman (yellow card) 64'; Minteh (yellow card) 82'	Report	Nwaneri 16', (yellow card) 45+1'; Merino (yellow card) 84'; Calafiori (yellow card) 90'	Stadium: Falmer Stadium; Attendance: 31,714; Referee: Anthony Taylor

15 January 2025 21	Arsenal	2–1	Tottenham Hotspur	Holloway
20:00 GMT	Solanke 40' (o.g.); Havertz (yellow card) 43'; Trossard 44'; Lewis-Skelly (yellow card) 87'; Gabriel (yellow card) 90+2'	Report	Son Heung-min 25'; Sarr (yellow card) 27'	Stadium: Emirates Stadium; Attendance: 60,287; Referee: Simon Hooper

18 January 2025 22	Arsenal	2–2	Aston Villa	Holloway
17:30 GMT	Martinelli 35'; Havertz 55'; Trossard (yellow card) 67'; Sterling (yellow card) 90+4'	Report	Maatsen (yellow card) 20'; Tielemans 60'; Watkins 68'; Kamara (yellow card) 78'; Rogers (yellow card) 90+5'	Stadium: Emirates Stadium; Attendance: 60,067; Referee: Chris Kavanagh

25 January 2025 23	Wolverhampton Wanderers	0–1	Arsenal	Wolverhampton
15:00 GMT	João Gomes (yellow card) 36' (yellow-red card) 70'	Report	Lewis-Skelly (red card) 43'; Timber (yellow card) 44'; Calafiori 74'	Stadium: Molineux Stadium; Attendance: 31,503; Referee: Michael Oliver

2 February 2025 24	Arsenal	5–1	Manchester City	Holloway
16:30 GMT	Ødegaard 2', (yellow card) 71'; Timber (yellow card) 25'; Partey 56'; Lewis-Skelly 62'; Havertz 76'; Nwaneri 90+3'	Report	Haaland 55'	Stadium: Emirates Stadium; Attendance: 60,355; Referee: Peter Bankes

15 February 2025 25	Leicester City	0–2	Arsenal	Leicester
12:30 GMT	El Khannouss (yellow card) 46'; Ayew (yellow card) 57'	Report	Merino 81', 87'; Jorginho (yellow card) 86'	Stadium: King Power Stadium; Attendance: 31,968; Referee: Sam Barrott

22 February 2025 26	Arsenal	0–1	West Ham United	Holloway
15:00 GMT	Lewis-Skelly (red card) 73'; Partey (yellow card) 86'	Report	Bowen 44'; Todibo (yellow card) 61'; Scarles (yellow card) 78'; Ward-Prowse (yellow card) 90+9'	Stadium: Emirates Stadium; Attendance: 60,262; Referee: Craig Pawson

26 February 2025 27	Nottingham Forest	0–0	Arsenal	West Bridgford
19:30 GMT	Milenković (yellow card) 4'	Report	Calafiori (yellow card) 3'	Stadium: City Ground; Attendance: 30,200; Referee: Andrew Madley

9 March 2025 28	Manchester United	1–1	Arsenal	Trafford
16:30 GMT	Fernandes 45+2'	Report	Trossard (yellow card) 45+1'; Rice 74'	Stadium: Old Trafford; Attendance: 73,812; Referee: Anthony Taylor

16 March 2025 29	Arsenal	1–0	Chelsea	Holloway
13:30 GMT	Merino 20'; Gabriel (yellow card) 54'; Partey (yellow card) 58'; Ødegaard (yellow card) 65'	Report	Colwill (yellow card) 30'; Neto (yellow card) 52'; Fofana (yellow card) 59'	Stadium: Emirates Stadium; Attendance: 60,311; Referee: Chris Kavanagh

1 April 2025 30	Arsenal	2–1	Fulham	Holloway
19:45 BST	Merino 37'; Rice (yellow card) 72'; Saka 73'	Report	Andersen (yellow card) 53'; Lukić (yellow card) 57'; Muniz 90+4'	Stadium: Emirates Stadium; Attendance: 60,256; Referee: John Brooks

5 April 2025 31	Everton	1–1	Arsenal	Liverpool
12:30 BST	O'Brien (yellow card) 18'; Ndiaye 49' (pen.); Tarkowski (yellow card) 63'; Alcaraz (yellow card) 88'	Report	Trossard 34'; Jorginho (yellow card) 48'	Stadium: Goodison Park; Attendance: 39,316; Referee: Darren England

12 April 2025 32	Arsenal	1–1	Brentford	Holloway
17:30 BST	Partey 61'; Ødegaard (yellow card) 90+4'	Report	Nørgaard (yellow card) 28'; Schade (yellow card) 34'; Wissa 74'; Yarmolyuk (yellow card) 78'	Stadium: Emirates Stadium; Attendance: 60,184; Referee: Simon Hooper

20 April 2025 33	Ipswich Town	0–4	Arsenal	Ipswich
14:00 BST	Davis (red card) 32'	Report	Trossard 14', 69'; Martinelli 28'; Nwaneri 88'	Stadium: Portman Road; Attendance: 29,549; Referee: Chris Kavanagh

23 April 2025 34	Arsenal	2–2	Crystal Palace	Holloway
20:00 BST	Kiwior 3'; Trossard 42'; Rice (yellow card) 45+2'	Report	Eze 27'; Devenny (yellow card) 47'; Mateta 83'	Stadium: Emirates Stadium; Attendance: 60,167; Referee: Michael Salisbury

3 May 2025 35	Arsenal	1–2	Bournemouth	Holloway
17:30 BST	Rice 34'	Report	Evanilson (yellow card) 58', (goal) 75'; Ouattara (yellow card) 64'; Huijsen 67'	Stadium: Emirates Stadium; Attendance: 60,110; Referee: Jarred Gillett

11 May 2025 36	Liverpool	2–2	Arsenal	Liverpool
16:30 BST	Gakpo 20'; Díaz 21'; Bradley (yellow card) 60'	Report	Merino (yellow card) 34' (yellow-red card) 79', (goal) 70'; Lewis-Skelly (yellow card) 43'; Martinelli 47'	Stadium: Anfield; Attendance: 60,324; Referee: Anthony Taylor

18 May 2025 37	Arsenal	1–0	Newcastle United	Holloway
16:30 BST	Rice 55'; Raya (yellow card) 90+4'; Havertz (yellow card) 90+4'; Kiwior (yellow card) 90+8'	Report	Krafth (yellow card) 64'; Willock (yellow card) 90+3'; Burn (yellow card) 90+8'	Stadium: Emirates Stadium; Attendance: 60,160; Referee: Simon Hooper

25 May 2025 38	Southampton	1–2	Arsenal	Southampton
16:00 BST	Stewart 56'	Report	Tierney 43'; Ødegaard 90'	Stadium: St Mary's Stadium; Attendance: 31,289; Referee: Darren Bond

=== FA Cup ===
As a Premier League side, Arsenal entered the FA Cup in the third round. They were drawn at home to Premier League side Manchester United.

12 January 2025 Third round	Arsenal	1–1 (a.e.t.) (3–5 p)	Manchester United	Holloway
15:00 GMT	Gabriel 63', (yellow card) 70'; Ødegaard (penalty missed) 72'; Havertz (yellow card) 72'	Report	Martínez (yellow card) 29'; Fernandes (yellow card) 38', (goal) 52'; Dalot (yellow card) 49' (yellow-red card) 61'; Mainoo (yellow card) 56'; Maguire (yellow card) 70'	Stadium: Emirates Stadium; Attendance: 60,109; Referee: Andrew Madley
	Penalties
	Ødegaard (penalty scored); Havertz (penalty missed); Rice (penalty scored); Partey (penalty scored)		(penalty scored) Fernandes; (penalty scored) Amad; (penalty scored) Yoro; (penalty scored) Martínez; (penalty scored) Zirkzee

=== EFL Cup ===
The Gunners entered the EFL Cup in the third round as one of the Premier League teams participating in UEFA competitions. They were drawn against League One side Bolton Wanderers at home and then away to Championship side Preston North End. In the quarter-finals, Arsenal then drew fellow Premier League side Crystal Palace in a home London derby. In the semi-finals, the Gunners were drawn against Premier League side Newcastle United, first leg at home then second leg away.

25 September 2024 Third round	Arsenal	5–1	Bolton Wanderers	Holloway
19:45 BST	Rice 16'; Calafiori (yellow card) 34'; Nwaneri 37', 49'; Sterling 64'; Havertz 77'	Report	Collins 53'	Stadium: Emirates Stadium; Attendance: 59,056; Referee: Josh Smith

30 October 2024 Fourth round	Preston North End	0–3	Arsenal	Preston
19:45 GMT	Kesler-Hayden (yellow card) 23'; Hughes (yellow card) 55'; Þórðarson (yellow card) 73'; Frøkjær-Jensen (yellow card) 83'	Report	Gabriel Jesus 24'; Nwaneri 33'; Havertz 57'	Stadium: Deepdale; Attendance: 21,811; Referee: Peter Bankes

18 December 2024 Quarter-finals	Arsenal	3–2	Crystal Palace	Holloway
19:30 GMT	Gabriel Jesus 54', 73', 81'; Lewis-Skelly (yellow card) 90'	Report	Mateta 4'; Kporha (yellow card) 23'; Nketiah 85'	Stadium: Emirates Stadium; Attendance: 59,298; Referee: Andrew Madley

7 January 2025 Semi-finals first leg	Arsenal	0–2	Newcastle United	Holloway
20:00 GMT	Zinchenko (yellow card) 80'	Report	Isak 37'; Joelinton (yellow card) 43'; Gordon 51', (yellow card) 55'; Livramento (yellow card) 90+5'	Stadium: Emirates Stadium; Attendance: 59,125; Referee: John Brooks

5 February 2025 Semi-finals second leg	Newcastle United	2–0 (4–0 agg.)	Arsenal	Newcastle upon Tyne
20:00 GMT	Murphy 19'; Bruno Guimarães (yellow card) 47'; Gordon 52'; Schär (yellow card) 90+2'	Report	Havertz (yellow card) 42'; Saliba (yellow card) 44'; Sterling (yellow card) 83'	Stadium: St James' Park; Attendance: 52,173; Referee: Simon Hooper

=== UEFA Champions League ===
==== League phase ====
Arsenal's UEFA club coefficient was 72.000 points at the end of the previous campaign. They were in Pot 2 for the league phase draw, which was held on 29 August 2024. Arsenal were randomly drawn to play Paris Saint-Germain and Inter Milan from Pot 1, Shakhtar Donetsk and Atalanta from Pot 2, Dinamo Zagreb and Sporting CP from Pot 3, and finally Monaco and debutants Girona from Pot 4.

===== League phase table =====
Pos	Team	Pld	W	D	L	GF	GA	GD	Pts	Qualification
1	(The Football Association) Liverpool	8	7	0	1	17	5	+12	21	Advance to round of 16 (seeded)
2	(Royal Spanish Football Federation) Barcelona	8	6	1	1	28	13	+15	19	Advance to round of 16 (seeded)
3	(The Football Association) Arsenal	8	6	1	1	16	3	+13	19	Advance to round of 16 (seeded)
4	(Italian Football Federation) Inter Milan	8	6	1	1	11	1	+10	19	Advance to round of 16 (seeded)
5	(Royal Spanish Football Federation) Atlético Madrid	8	6	0	2	20	12	+8	18	Advance to round of 16 (seeded)

Source: UEFA
Rules for classification: League phase tiebreakers

===== Results summary =====
Overall								Home						Away					
Pld	W	D	L	GF	GA	GD	Pts	W	D	L	GF	GA	GD	W	D	L	GF	GA	GD
8	6	1	1	16	3	+13	19	4	0	0	9	0	+9	2	1	1	7	3	+4

Source: UEFA

===== Results by round =====
Round	1	2	3	4	5	6	7	8
Ground	A	H	H	A	A	H	H	A
Result	D	W	W	L	W	W	W	W
Position	16	13	9	12	7	3	3	3
Points	1	4	7	7	10	13	16	19

Source: UEFA
A = Away; H = Home; W = Win; D = Draw; L = Loss; P = Postponed

===== Matches =====
For a second season in a row, Arsenal won all of their Champions League home games in the league phase/group stage without conceding a single goal.

19 September 2024 1	Atalanta (Italian Football Federation)	0–0	(The Football Association) Arsenal	Bergamo, Italy
21:00 CEST (20:00 BST)	Éderson (yellow card) 12'; Retegui (penalty missed) 51'	Report		Stadium: Stadio di Bergamo; Attendance: 22,858; Referee: Clément Turpin (France)

1 October 2024 2	Arsenal (The Football Association)	2–0	(French Football Federation) Paris Saint-Germain	London, England
20:00 BST	Havertz 20'; Saka 35'; Calafiori (yellow card) 76'	Report	Fabián (yellow card) 76'	Stadium: Emirates Stadium; Attendance: 60,103; Referee: Slavko Vinčić (Slovenia)

22 October 2024 3	Arsenal (The Football Association)	1–0	(Ukrainian Association of Football) Shakhtar Donetsk	London, England
20:00 BST	Riznyk 29' (o.g.); White (yellow card) 34'; Trossard (penalty missed) 77'; Martinelli (yellow card) 84'	Report	Pedro Henrique (yellow card) 90+6'	Stadium: Emirates Stadium; Attendance: 59,594; Referee: Benoît Bastien (France)

6 November 2024 4	Inter Milan (Italian Football Federation)	1–0	(The Football Association) Arsenal	Milan, Italy
21:00 CET (20:00 GMT)	Martínez (yellow card) 15'; Çalhanoğlu 45+3' (pen.); Barella (yellow card) 68'	Report	Gabriel (yellow card) 15'; Gabriel Jesus (yellow card) 68'	Stadium: San Siro; Attendance: 75,222; Referee: István Kovács (Romania)

26 November 2024 5	Sporting CP (Portuguese Football Federation)	1–5	(The Football Association) Arsenal	Lisbon, Portugal
20:00 WET (20:00 GMT)	Diomande (yellow card) 4'; Inácio 47'	Report	Martinelli 7'; Havertz 22'; Gabriel 45+1'; Raya (yellow card) 52'; Saka 65' (pen.); Trossard 82'	Stadium: Estádio José Alvalade; Attendance: 47,386; Referee: Szymon Marciniak (Poland)

11 December 2024 6	Arsenal (The Football Association)	3–0	(French Football Federation) Monaco	London, England
20:00 GMT	Martinelli (yellow card) 32'; Saka 34', 78'; Merino (yellow card) 60'; Havertz 88'	Report	Vanderson (yellow card) 63'	Stadium: Emirates Stadium; Attendance: 60,157; Referee: Davide Massa (Italy)

22 January 2025 7	Arsenal (The Football Association)	3–0	(Croatian Football Federation) Dinamo Zagreb	London, England
20:00 GMT	Rice 2'; Sterling (yellow card) 47'; Timber (yellow card) 51'; Havertz 66'; Ødegaard 90+1'	Report	Ademi (yellow card) 38'; Kačavenda (yellow card) 69'	Stadium: Emirates Stadium; Attendance: 60,024; Referee: Daniel Siebert (Germany)

29 January 2025 8	Girona (Royal Spanish Football Federation)	1–2	(The Football Association) Arsenal	Girona, Spain
21:00 CET (20:00 GMT)	Danjuma 28'; Yaakobishvili (yellow card) 51'; Portu (yellow card) 79'; Martínez (yellow card) 85'; Stuani (yellow card) 90+3'	Report	Jorginho 38' (pen.); Nwaneri 42'; Sterling (yellow card) 70', (penalty missed) 90+3'; Rice (yellow card) 90+3'	Stadium: Montilivi; Attendance: 9,048; Referee: Maurizio Mariani (Italy)

==== Knockout phase ====
===== Round of 16 =====
As a result of finishing third in the league phase, Arsenal were seeded for the round of 16 draw, which took place on 21 February 2025, and would play the second leg at home. They were drawn against Dutch side PSV Eindhoven for the third consecutive European campaign.

4 March 2025 First leg	PSV Eindhoven (Royal Dutch Football Association)	1–7	(The Football Association) Arsenal	Eindhoven, Netherlands
21:00 CET (20:00 GMT)	Lang 43' (pen.); Malacia (yellow card) 89'	Report	Timber 18', (yellow card) 69'; Nwaneri 21'; Lewis-Skelly (yellow card) 24'; Merino 31'; Partey (yellow card) 42'; Ødegaard 47', 73'; Trossard 48'; Calafiori 85'	Stadium: Philips Stadion; Attendance: 34,400; Referee: Jesús Gil Manzano (Spain)

12 March 2025 Second leg	Arsenal (The Football Association)	2–2 (9–3 agg.)	(Royal Dutch Football Association) PSV Eindhoven	London, England
20:00 GMT	Zinchenko 6'; Rice 37', (yellow card) 63'; Kiwior (yellow card) 42'; Sterling (yellow card) 90+3'	Report	Perišić 18'; Babadi (yellow card) 34'; Driouech 70'	Stadium: Emirates Stadium; Attendance: 59,410; Referee: Rade Obrenovič (Slovenia)

===== Quarter-finals =====
The draw for the order of the quarter-final legs was held on 21 February 2025, after the round of 16 draw. As a result of Real Madrid progressing past their city rivals Atlético Madrid on penalties, Arsenal were drawn to play the record 15-time champions, with the first leg at home.

This was the first time since the 2009–10 season that Arsenal had qualified for consecutive Champions League quarter-finals.

8 April 2025 First leg	Arsenal (The Football Association)	3–0	(Royal Spanish Football Federation) Real Madrid	London, England
20:00 BST	Partey (yellow card) 54'; Rice 58', 70'; Merino 75'	Report	Camavinga (yellow card) 69' (yellow-red card) 90+4'	Stadium: Emirates Stadium; Attendance: 60,110; Referee: Irfan Peljto (Bosnia and Herzegovina)

16 April 2025 Second leg	Real Madrid (Royal Spanish Football Federation)	1–2 (1–5 agg.)	(The Football Association) Arsenal	Madrid, Spain
21:00 CEST (20:00 BST)	Alaba (yellow card) 4'; Asencio (yellow card) 11'; Vinícius 67'; Rüdiger (yellow card) 85'	Report	Saka (penalty missed) 13', 65'; Raya (yellow card) 36'; Partey (yellow card) 85'; Martinelli 90+3'	Stadium: Santiago Bernabéu; Attendance: 77,073; Referee: François Letexier (France)

===== Semi-finals =====
The draw for the order of the semi-final legs was held on 21 February 2025, after the round of 16 and quarter-final draw. Arsenal were drawn to play French champions Paris Saint-Germain, who had eliminated Premier League sides Liverpool and Aston Villa in earlier rounds, with the first leg at home.

This was Arsenal's first appearance in a Champions League semi-final since the 2008–09 season.

29 April 2025 First leg	Arsenal (The Football Association)	0–1	(French Football Federation) Paris Saint-Germain	London, England
20:00 BST	Trossard (yellow card) 10'; Saka (yellow card) 43'	Report	Dembélé 4'; Hakimi (yellow card) 44'; Neves (yellow card) 46'	Stadium: Emirates Stadium; Attendance: 59,664; Referee: Slavko Vinčić (Slovenia)

7 May 2025 Second leg	Paris Saint-Germain (French Football Federation)	2–1 (3–1 agg.)	(The Football Association) Arsenal	Paris, France
21:00 CEST (20:00 BST)	Mendes (yellow card) 18'; Fabián 27'; Vitinha (penalty missed) 69'; Hakimi 72'; Kvaratskhelia (yellow card) 86'	Report	Rice (yellow card) 26'; Lewis-Skelly (yellow card) 56'; Saka 76', (yellow card) 86'; Calafiori (yellow card) 86'	Stadium: Parc des Princes; Attendance: 47,511; Referee: Felix Zwayer (Germany)

== Statistics ==
Keys
Final score	The score at full time; Arsenal's listed first.	(N)	The game was played at a neutral site.
(H)	Arsenal were the home team.	(A)	Arsenal were the away team.
Opponent	The opponent team without a flag is English.		
Player^{*}	Player who joined Arsenal permanently or on loan during the season		
Player^{†}	Player who departed Arsenal permanently or on loan during the season		
Player^{#}	Player who was registered as an Arsenal U21 or U18 player during the season		

=== Appearances ===
The following thirty-two players made appearances for Arsenal's first team during the season, six of them (Martinelli, Partey, Raya, Rice, Saliba and Trossard) each played at least 50 of the total 58 matches. Trossard made a team-high 56 appearances, the most by a player for the Gunners since Lee Dixon and Nigel Winterburn had both played 57 in 1994–95. Raya played 55 games this season, the most by an Arsenal goalkeeper since David Seaman in 1993–94.

This season was the first time since 2020–21 that the Gunners had used four different goalkeepers (Neto, Porter, Raya & Setford) in a single campaign, and was the first time in their history that Arsenal had fielded two different teenage goalkeepers (Porter & Setford) in the same campaign.

Includes all competitions for senior teams. Players with no appearances not included in the list. When two Arsenal players make their first-team debuts at the same time, the Heritage number goes in order of who joined the club earlier.

2024–25 season									Career club total	Ref.
Squad number	Heritage number	Pos.	Player	Premier League	FA Cup	EFL Cup	Champions League	Season total	Career club total	Ref.
2	887	DF	(France) William Saliba	35	1	3+1	11	50+1	134	
3	869	DF	(Scotland) Kieran Tierney	2+11	0+1	1	1+4	4+16	144	
4	882	DF	(England) Ben White	13+4	0	0	4+5	17+9	160	
5	874	MF	(Ghana) Thomas Partey	31+4	0+1	3+1	11+1	45+7	167	
6	872	DF	(Brazil) Gabriel Magalhães	28	1	2+2	9	40+2	210	
7	862	FW	(England) Bukayo Saka	20+5	0	1+2	9	30+7	263	
8	879	MF	(Norway) Martin Ødegaard	26+4	1	2+1	9+2	38+7	198	
9	888	FW	(Brazil) Gabriel Jesus	6+11	1	3+1	3+2	13+14	96	
11	867	FW	(Brazil) Gabriel Martinelli	25+8	1	3+1	11+2	40+11	225	
12	899	DF	(Netherlands) Jurriën Timber	27+3	1	4	10+3	42+6	51	
15	897	DF	(Poland) Jakub Kiwior	10+7	0	3	8+2	21+9	68	
17	889	DF	(Ukraine) Oleksandr Zinchenko	5+10	0	1+1	2+4	8+15	91	
18	885	DF	(Japan) Takehiro Tomiyasu	0+1	0	0	0	0+1	84	
19	895	FW	(Belgium) Leandro Trossard	28+10	0+1	3	6+8	37+19	124	
20	896	MF	(Italy) Jorginho	9+6	1	3+2	3+3	16+11	79	
22	901	GK	(Spain) David Raya^{*}	38	1	3	13	55	96	
23	910	MF	(Spain) Mikel Merino^{*}	17+11	1	2+1	9+3	29+15	44	
29	898	FW	(Germany) Kai Havertz	21+2	1	2+2	6+2	30+6	87	
30	904	FW	(England) Raheem Sterling^{*}	7+10	0+1	3+1	3+3	13+15	28	
32	914	GK	(Brazil) Neto^{*}	0	0	0	1	1	1	
33	903	DF	(Italy) Riccardo Calafiori^{*}	11+8	0	1+1	4+4	16+13	29	
36	911	GK	(England) Tommy Setford^{*#}	0	0	1	0	1	1	
37	913	FW	(England) Nathan Butler-Oyedeji^{#}	0+1	0	0	0+1	0+2	2	
41	900	MF	(England) Declan Rice	33+2	0+1	3	12+1	48+4	103	
46	909	FW	(Netherlands) Ismeal Kabia^{#}	0	0	0+1	0	0+1	1	
49	905	MF	(England) Myles Lewis-Skelly^{#}	15+8	1	3+2	7+3	26+13	39	
51	906	DF	(England) Josh Nichols^{#}	0	0	1	0	1	1	
53	893	MF	(England) Ethan Nwaneri^{#}	11+15	0	3+1	2+5	16+21	39	
92	907	GK	(England) Jack Porter^{#}	0	0	1	0	1	1	
Players who departed the club on loan but featured this season
24	844	FW	(England) Reiss Nelson^{†}	0+1	0	0	0	0+1	90	
47	908	DF	(Albania) Maldini Kacurri^{†#}	0	0	0+1	0	0+1	1	
Players who departed the club permanently but featured this season
76	912	DF	(England) Ayden Heaven^{†#}	0	0	0+1	0	0+1	1	

=== Goals ===
Arsenal scored 112 goals in all competitions this season – the second most they had scored in a single campaign since 2016–17 – one less than they had managed in the previous season. They bagged 31 goals in the Champions League, their highest-ever total IN the competition.

The following twenty players scored for Arsenal's first team during the season. It was the first time since 1923–24 that the Gunners had not had a player score ten or more domestic league goals in a season.

New recruit and Spanish midfielder Mikel Merino – who played as a makeshift striker between February and May 2025 – scored a career-best nine goals in all competitions this season.

Includes all competitions for senior teams. The list is sorted by squad number when season-total goals are equal.

2024–25 season									Career club total	Ref.
Rk.	No.	Pos.	Player	Premier League	FA Cup	EFL Cup	Champions League	Season total	Career club total	Ref.
1	29	FW	(Germany) Kai Havertz	9	0	2	4	15	29	
2	7	FW	(England) Bukayo Saka	6	0	0	6	12	70	
3	11	FW	(Brazil) Gabriel Martinelli	8	0	0	2	10	51	
3	19	FW	(Belgium) Leandro Trossard	8	0	0	2	10	28	
5	23	MF	(Spain) Mikel Merino^{*}	7	0	0	2	9	9	
5	41	MF	(England) Declan Rice	4	0	1	4	9	16	
5	53	MF	(England) Ethan Nwaneri^{#}	4	0	3	2	9	9	
8	9	FW	(Brazil) Gabriel Jesus	3	0	4	0	7	26	
9	8	MF	(Norway) Martin Ødegaard	3	0	0	3	6	41	
10	6	DF	(Brazil) Gabriel Magalhães	3	1	0	1	5	20	
11	5	MF	(Ghana) Thomas Partey	4	0	0	0	4	9	
12	33	DF	(Italy) Riccardo Calafiori^{*}	2	0	0	1	3	3	
13	2	DF	(France) William Saliba	2	0	0	0	2	7	
13	12	DF	(Netherlands) Jurriën Timber	1	0	0	1	2	2	
15	3	DF	(Scotland) Kieran Tierney	1	0	0	0	1	6	
15	15	DF	(Poland) Jakub Kiwior	1	0	0	0	1	3	
15	17	DF	(Ukraine) Oleksandr Zinchenko	0	0	0	1	1	3	
15	20	MF	(Italy) Jorginho	0	0	0	1	1	2	
15	30	FW	(England) Raheem Sterling^{*}	0	0	1	0	1	1	
15	49	MF	(England) Myles Lewis-Skelly^{#}	1	0	0	0	1	1	
Own goal(s)				2	0	0	1	3		
Total				69	1	11	31	112		

The following table lists the top ten assist providers for Arsenal during the 2024–25 season in all competitions. Assists are credited according to FBref statistics and include appearances in the Premier League, UEFA Champions League, FA Cup and EFL Cup.

Arsenal F.C. top assist providers (2024–25 season, all competitions)
Rank	Player	Assists
1	(Norway) Martin Ødegaard	12
2	(England) Declan Rice	10
3	(Belgium) Leandro Trossard	9
4	(Germany) Kai Havertz	8
5	(England) Bukayo Saka	8
6	(Brazil) Gabriel Martinelli	7
7	(Netherlands) Jurriën Timber	4
8	(England) Myles Lewis-Skelly	3
9	(Ghana) Thomas Partey	2
10	(Spain) Mikel Merino	2

==== Hat-tricks ====
Includes all competitions for senior teams. Players with no hat-tricks not included in the list.

- Score – The score at the time of each goal. Arsenal's score listed first.

Date	No.	Pos.	Player	Score	Final score	Opponent	Competition	Ref.
18 Dec 2024	9	FW	(Brazil) Gabriel Jesus	1–1, 2–1, 3–1 (H)	3–2 (H)	Crystal Palace	EFL Cup	

=== Disciplinary record ===
Includes all competitions for senior teams. The list is sorted by red cards, then yellow cards (and by squad number when total cards are equal). Players with no cards not included in the list.

Rk.	No.	Pos.	Player	Premier League			FA Cup			EFL Cup			Champions League			Total			Ref.
Rk.	No.	Pos.	Player	Yellow card	Second yellow card	Red card	Yellow card	Second yellow card	Red card	Yellow card	Second yellow card	Red card	Yellow card	Second yellow card	Red card	Yellow card	Second yellow card	Red card	Ref.
1	49	MF	(England) Myles Lewis-Skelly^{#}	3	0	2 (Note: Lewis-Skelly would not serve a suspension after Arsenal's appeal against his red card at Wolverhampton Wanderers was upheld by an FA's independent regulatory commission in January 2025.)	0	0	0	1	0	0	2	0	0	6	0	2	
2	2	DF	(France) William Saliba	2	0	1	0	0	0	1	0	0	0	0	0	3	0	1	
3	41	MF	(England) Declan Rice	5	1	0	0	0	0	0	0	0	3	0	0	8	1	0	
4	19	FW	(Belgium) Leandro Trossard	2	1	0	0	0	0	0	0	0	1	0	0	3	1	0	
4	23	MF	(Spain) Mikel Merino^{*}	2	1	0	0	0	0	0	0	0	1	0	0	3	1	0	
6	12	DF	(Netherlands) Jurriën Timber	7	0	0	0	0	0	0	0	0	2	0	0	9	0	0	
7	5	MF	(Ghana) Thomas Partey	4	0	0	0	0	0	0	0	0	3	0	0	7	0	0	
7	29	FW	(Germany) Kai Havertz	5	0	0	1	0	0	1	0	0	0	0	0	7	0	0	
7	33	DF	(Italy) Riccardo Calafiori^{*}	4	0	0	0	0	0	1	0	0	2	0	0	7	0	0	
10	6	DF	(Brazil) Gabriel Magalhães	4	0	0	1	0	0	0	0	0	1	0	0	6	0	0	
11	7	FW	(England) Bukayo Saka	3	0	0	0	0	0	0	0	0	2	0	0	5	0	0	
11	9	FW	(Brazil) Gabriel Jesus	4	0	0	0	0	0	0	0	0	1	0	0	5	0	0	
11	20	MF	(Italy) Jorginho	5	0	0	0	0	0	0	0	0	0	0	0	5	0	0	
11	22	GK	(Spain) David Raya^{*}	3	0	0	0	0	0	0	0	0	2	0	0	5	0	0	
11	30	FW	(England) Raheem Sterling^{*}	1	0	0	0	0	0	1	0	0	3	0	0	5	0	0	
16	8	MF	(Norway) Martin Ødegaard	4	0	0	0	0	0	0	0	0	0	0	0	4	0	0	
17	4	DF	(England) Ben White	2	0	0	0	0	0	0	0	0	1	0	0	3	0	0	
17	11	FW	(Brazil) Gabriel Martinelli	1	0	0	0	0	0	0	0	0	2	0	0	3	0	0	
19	15	DF	(Poland) Jakub Kiwior	1	0	0	0	0	0	0	0	0	1	0	0	2	0	0	
19	17	DF	(Ukraine) Oleksandr Zinchenko	1	0	0	0	0	0	1	0	0	0	0	0	2	0	0	
21	53	MF	(England) Ethan Nwaneri^{#}	1	0	0	0	0	0	0	0	0	0	0	0	1	0	0	
Total				64	3	3	2	0	0	6	0	0	27	0	0	99	3	3	

=== Clean sheets ===
David Raya claimed a clean sheet against Ipswich Town on 27 December 2024, his 23rd in 50 Premier League games for the Gunners. In doing so, the Spaniard broke David Seaman's record (22) set in 1993 for the most clean sheets kept by an Arsenal goalkeeper in his first 50 appearances for the club in the division.

No team kept more than the Gunners' 13 clean sheets (7 at home, 6 on the road) in the Premier League this campaign. Raya won the Premier League Golden Glove for the second consecutive season, sharing the award with Nottingham Forest goalkeeper Matz Sels. Raya became the fourth goalkeeper to win it in successive seasons since its inception during the 2004–05 campaign after Pepe Reina, Joe Hart and Ederson, and the first Arsenal player to do so.

Includes all competitions for senior teams. The list is sorted by squad number when season-total clean sheets are equal. Goalkeepers with no appearances not included in the list.

2024–25 season									Career club total	Ref.
Rk.	No.	Goalkeeper	Premier League	FA Cup	EFL Cup	Champions League	Season total	Season percentage	Career club total	Ref.
1	22	(Spain) David Raya^{*}	13	0	0	6	19	35% (19/55)	39	
2	36	(England) Tommy Setford^{*#}	0	0	1	0	1	100% (1/1)	1	
3	32	(Brazil) Neto^{*}	0	0	0	0	0	0% (0/1)	0	
3	92	(England) Jack Porter^{#}	0	0	0	0	0	0% (0/1)	0	
Total			13	0	1	6	20	34% (20/58)		

== Awards and nominations ==
Keys
M	Matches	W	Won	D	Drawn	L	Lost
Pts	Points	GF	Goals for	GA	Goals against	GD	Goal difference
Pos.	Position	Pld	Played	G	Goals	A	Assists
CS	Clean sheets (for defenders and goalkeepers)			S	Saves (for goalkeepers)		
Final score	The score at full time; Arsenal's listed first.			(N)	The game was played at a neutral site.		
(H)	Arsenal were the home team.			(A)	Arsenal were the away team.		
Opponent	The opponent team without a flag is English.						
Player^{*}	Player who joined Arsenal permanently or on loan during the season						
Player^{†}	Player who departed Arsenal permanently or on loan during the season						
Player^{#}	Player who was registered as an Arsenal U21 or U18 player during the season						

=== Monthly awards ===
==== Arsenal Player of the Month ====
The winner of the award was chosen via a poll on the club's official website.

Month	Pos.	Player	Pld	G	A	CS	Votes	Ref.
Aug 2024	FW	(England) Bukayo Saka	3	1	3	–	42%	
Sep 2024	GK	(Spain) David Raya^{*}	4	0	0	2	44%	
Oct 2024	FW	(England) Bukayo Saka	4	3	2	–	50%	
Nov 2024	FW	(England) Bukayo Saka	6	3	4	–	58%	
Dec 2024	FW	(Brazil) Gabriel Jesus	6	5	1	–	50%	
Jan 2025	DF	(Brazil) Gabriel Magalhães	9	1	0	2	37%	
Feb 2025	MF	(England) Ethan Nwaneri^{#}	5	1	1	–	54%	
Mar 2025	MF	(Spain) Mikel Merino^{*}	4	2	1	–	39%	
Apr 2025	MF	(England) Declan Rice	8	2	2	–	68%	

==== Arsenal Goal of the Month ====
The winner of the award was chosen from goals scored by men's, women's and academy teams via a poll on the club's official website.

- Score – The score at the time of the goal. Arsenal's score listed first.
- Player^{◊} – Women's first-team player
- Player^{#} – Academy player

Month	Pos.	Player	Score	Final score	Opponent	Competition	Date	Votes	Ref.
Aug 2024	FW	(Germany) Kai Havertz	1–0 (H)	1–1 (H)	Brighton & Hove Albion	Premier League	31 Aug	28%	
Sep 2024	DF	(Italy) Riccardo Calafiori^{*}	1–1 (A)	2–2 (A)	Manchester City	Premier League	22 Sep	40%	
Oct 2024	FW	(Australia) Caitlin Foord^{◊}	1–2 (H)	1–2 (H)	Chelsea Women	Women's Super League	12 Oct	42%	
Nov 2024	MF	(Norway) Frida Maanum^{◊}	3–0 (H)	5–0 (H)	Brighton & Hove Albion Women	Women's Super League	8 Nov	40%	
Dec 2024	FW	(England) Alessia Russo^{◊}	4–0 (H)	4–0 (H)	Aston Villa Women	Women's Super League	8 Dec	48%	
Jan 2025	MF	(England) Ethan Nwaneri^{#}	2–1 (A)	2–1 (A)	(Spain) Girona	Champions League	29 Jan	Unknown	
Feb 2025	DF	(United States) Emily Fox^{◊}	5–0 (H)	5–0 (H)	Tottenham Hotspur Women	Women's Super League	16 Feb	Unknown	
Mar 2025	FW	(Republic of Ireland) Katie McCabe^{◊}	2–3 (H)	4–3 (H)	West Ham United Women	Women's Super League	2 Mar	29%	
Apr 2025	MF	(England) Declan Rice	2–0 (H)	3–0 (H)	(Spain) Real Madrid	Champions League	8 Apr	67%	
May 2025	FW	(Sweden) Stina Blackstenius^{◊}	1–0 (N)	1–0 (N)	(Spain) Barcelona Femení	Women's Champions League	24 May	77%	

==== Premier League Manager of the Month ====
The winner of the award was chosen by a combination of an online public vote and a panel of experts.

Month	Manager	M	W	D	L	GF	GA	GD	Pts	Pos	Result	Ref.
Aug 2024	(Spain) Mikel Arteta	3	2	1	0	5	1	+4	7	4th	Nominated	
Sep 2024	(Spain) Mikel Arteta	3	2	1	0	7	4	+3	7	3rd	Nominated	
Jan 2025	(Spain) Mikel Arteta	5	3	2	0	9	5	+4	11	2nd	Nominated	

==== Premier League Player of the Month ====
The winner of the award was chosen by a combination of an online public vote, a panel of experts, and the captain of each Premier League club.

Month	Pos.	Player	Pld	G	A	CS	S	Result	Ref.
Aug 2024	GK	(Spain) David Raya^{*}	3	0	0	2	9	Nominated	
Aug 2024	FW	(England) Bukayo Saka	3	1	3	–	–	Nominated	
Sep 2024	DF	(Brazil) Gabriel Magalhães	3	2	0	1	–	Nominated	
Oct 2024	FW	(England) Bukayo Saka	2	2	2	–	–	Nominated	
Nov 2024	MF	(Norway) Martin Ødegaard	3	1	2	–	–	Nominated	
Nov 2024	FW	(England) Bukayo Saka	4	2	3	–	–	Nominated	
Mar 2025	MF	(England) Declan Rice	2	1	0	–	–	Nominated	

==== Premier League Goal of the Month ====
The winner of the award was chosen by a combination of an online public vote and a panel of experts.

- Score – The score at the time of the goal. Arsenal's score listed first.

Month	Pos.	Player	Score	Final score	Opponent	Date	Result	Ref.
Sep 2024	DF	(Italy) Riccardo Calafiori^{*}	1–1 (A)	2–2 (A)	Manchester City	22 Sep	Nominated	
Oct 2024	FW	(England) Bukayo Saka	1–0 (H)	2–2 (H)	Liverpool	27 Oct	Nominated	
Feb 2025	MF	(England) Ethan Nwaneri^{#}	5–1 (H)	5–1 (H)	Manchester City	2 Feb	Nominated	
Mar 2025	MF	(England) Declan Rice	1–1 (A)	1–1 (A)	Manchester United	9 Mar	Nominated	

==== Premier League Save of the Month ====
The winner of the award was chosen by a combination of an online public vote and a panel of experts.

David Raya became the first goalkeeper in the award's history to be nominated for two separate saves in the same month when he did so in August 2024.

- Score – The score at the time of the save. Arsenal's score listed first.

Month	Goalkeeper	Score	Final score	Opponent	Shot taker	Date	Result	Ref.
Aug 2024	(Spain) David Raya^{*}	1–0 (H)	2–0 (H)	Wolverhampton Wanderers	Jørgen Strand Larsen	17 Aug	Nominated	
Aug 2024	(Spain) David Raya^{*}	0–0 (A)	2–0 (A)	Aston Villa	Ollie Watkins	24 Aug	Won	
Dec 2024	(Spain) David Raya^{*}	1–0 (H)	2–0 (H)	Manchester United	Matthijs de Ligt	4 Dec	Nominated	
Jan 2025	(Spain) David Raya^{*}	0–0 (A)	1–0 (A)	Wolverhampton Wanderers	Matheus Cunha	25 Jan	Nominated	
Feb 2025	(Spain) David Raya^{*}	1–0 (H)	5–1 (H)	Manchester City	Joško Gvardiol	2 Feb	Nominated	
Mar 2025	(Spain) David Raya^{*}	0–1 (A)	1–1 (A)	Manchester United	Noussair Mazraoui	9 Mar	Nominated	
Mar 2025	(Spain) David Raya^{*}	1–1 (A)	1–1 (A)	Manchester United	Bruno Fernandes	9 Mar	Won	

=== Yearly awards ===
==== Arsenal F.C. ====
Award	Player	Votes	Notes	Ref.
2024–25 Player of the Season	(England) Declan Rice	52%		

==== Premier League ====
Award	Player	Result	Ref.
2024–25 Player of the Season	(England) Declan Rice	Nominated	
2024–25 Young Player of the Season	(France) William Saliba	Nominated	
2024–25 Golden Glove	(Spain) David Raya^{*}	Shared (Note: Raya shared the award with Nottingham Forest goalkeeper Matz Sels.)	

==== Football Writers' Association ====
Award	Player	Result	Ref.
2025 Footballer of the Year	(England) Declan Rice	4th	

==== London Football Awards ====
Award	Manager or Player	Result	Ref.
2025 Premier League Player of the Year	(Brazil) Gabriel Magalhães	Nominated	
2025 Men's Young Player of the Year	(England) Myles Lewis-Skelly^{#}	Nominated	
2025 Men's Young Player of the Year	(England) Ethan Nwaneri^{#}	Nominated	
2025 Goalkeeper of the Year	(Spain) David Raya	Won	
2025 Manager of the Year	(Spain) Mikel Arteta	Nominated	

==== UEFA ====
Award	Player	Result	Ref.
2024–25 Champions League Team of the Season	(England) Declan Rice	Selected	

== Sources ==
- Rogers, Jonathon (14 August 2024). "All the changes in the Premier League for 2024/25". Arsenal FC.
- Rogers, Jonathon (29 August 2024). "Learn more about the new Champions League format". Arsenal FC.
- "Arsenal transfers: All the ins and outs in 2024/25". Arsenal FC. 30 August 2024.
- Rogers, Jonathon (17 September 2024). "See our men's first-team's 2024/25 squad photo". Arsenal FC.
- James, Josh (31 December 2024). "The stats behind a record-breaking 2024". Arsenal FC.
- Rogers, Jonathon (29 May 2025). "Games, goals, great stats: Numbers behind 24/25". Arsenal FC.
- Rogers, Jonathon (30 May 2025). "112 goals! Who scored, and how, where and when". Arsenal FC.
- Rogers, Jonathon (31 May 2025). "All the records we broke in 2024/25". Arsenal FC.
- Rogers, Jonathon (1 June 2025). "We did what?! Crazy and obscure facts from 2024/25". Arsenal FC.
