= Jack Porter (footballer) =

English footballer (born 2008)

Personal information
- Full name: Jack Kenny Porter
- Date of birth: 15 July 2008 (age 18)
- Place of birth: Harlow, Essex, England
- Height: 1.87 m (6 ft 2 in)
- Position: Goalkeeper

Team information
- Current team: Arsenal
- Number: 55

Youth career
- 2020–: Arsenal

Senior career*
Years	Team	Apps	(Gls)
2024–	Arsenal	0	(0)

International career^{‡}
2023–2024	England U16	4	(0)
2024–2025	England U17	13	(0)
2025–	England U18	2	(0)
2025–	England U19	1	(0)
- * Club domestic league appearances and goals ‡ National team caps and goals as of 15:19, 31 March 2026 (UTC)

Jack Kenny Porter (born 15 July 2008) is an English professional footballer who plays as a goalkeeper for Premier League club Arsenal.

== Early life ==
Porter attended The Leventhorpe School and Saint Nicholas School in Old Harlow.

== Club career ==
Porter joined Arsenal in 2020 and formally signed scholarship terms at the club in July 2024.

Porter was promoted to be Arsenal's third choice goalkeeper in September 2024 after an injury to Tommy Setford. He was an unused substitute against Atalanta in the UEFA Champions League in September 2024, and travelled with the first team squad for their next match, in the Premier League against Manchester City. When first choice goalkeeper David Raya picked up an injury against Manchester City, and with Arsenal second choice goalkeeper Neto cup tied and unavailable having played for AFC Bournemouth earlier in the competition, Porter was selected to make his professional debut in the EFL Cup against Bolton Wanderers on 25 September 2024. At the age of 16 years old and 72 days, he became the youngest player at the time to start a match for Arsenal. A year later, on 29 October 2025, Max Dowman started an EFL Cup match against Brighton & Hove Albion at the age of 15 years and 302 days, breaking Porter's record.

== International career ==
As well as England, Porter is eligible to represent the Republic of Ireland through family ancestry.

Porter has represented England at under-16 level. In May 2025, he was included in the England under-17 squad for the 2025 UEFA European Under-17 Championship. Later that year Porter was a member of the England side at the 2025 FIFA U-17 World Cup and started all five of their games at the tournament including the round of sixteen elimination against Austria.

In September 2025, Porter made his debut at England under-19 level starting in a victory against Ukraine. The following month saw him make his first appearance for England U18 in a draw with France.

== Career statistics ==
=== Club ===
As of match played 25 September 2024

Appearances and goals by club, season and competition
Club	Season	League			FA Cup		EFL Cup		Europe		Other		Total	
Club	Season	Division	Apps	Goals	Apps	Goals	Apps	Goals	Apps	Goals	Apps	Goals	Apps	Goals
Arsenal	2024–25	Premier League	0	0	0	0	1	0	0	0	—		1	0
Arsenal	2025–26	Premier League	0	0	0	0	0	0	0	0	—		0	0
Career total			0	0	0	0	1	0	0	0	0	0	1	0
