= Zafar Iqbal (physician) =

Pakistani-English physician

Zafar Iqbal (born 18 November 1974) is a Pakistani-English physician who was most recently the Head of Sports Medicine for Premier League club Arsenal.

== Early life ==
Born in Pakistan, Iqbal and his parents eventually settled in Rochdale, England, where he grew up. Iqbal started thinking of becoming a physician at the age of 10, after his sister suffered cancer. He started studying sports medicine after suffering an injury playing football.

== Career ==
Iqbal has worked as a physician for English sides Leyton Orient, Tottenham Hotspur, Liverpool,Crystal Palace and Arsenal F.C.

== Personal life ==
He is married and has three children.
