= 1952–53 Arsenal F.C. season =

English football club season

Arsenal
1952–53 season
- Chairman: Bracewell Smith
- Manager: Tom Whittaker
- First Division: 1st
- FA Cup: Sixth round
Home colours	Away colours	FA Cup away colours

During the 1952–53 English football season, Arsenal F.C. competed in the Football League First Division.

== Season summary ==
After finishing third the previous term, Arsenal battled with Preston North End in the 1952/53 season for the title, and ultimately finished level on points; however, Arsenal won the league for the seventh time on goal average, by a margin of 0.099. With Preston having won their final game of the season two days before Arsenal faced Burnley in their final match, it meant Arsenal needed to win to claim the title. Goals from Alex Forbes, Jimmy Logie and Doug Lishman ensured a 3–2 win.

In the FA Cup, Arsenal beat Doncaster Rovers, Bury and Burnley before being knocked out by eventual winners Blackpool in the quarter-finals. The Gunners' biggest win was joint between the cup win over Bury and a league fixture against Derby County; both were won 6–2. Their highest scoring match was a 6–4 triumph at Reading, and their top scorer Doug Lishman, who scored 25 goals in all competitions.

== Final league table ==
Pos	Team	Pld	W	D	L	GF	GA	GAv	Pts
1	Arsenal (C)	42	21	12	9	97	64	1.516	54
2	Preston North End	42	21	12	9	85	60	1.417	54
3	Wolverhampton Wanderers	42	19	13	10	86	63	1.365	51
4	West Bromwich Albion	42	21	8	13	66	60	1.100	50
5	Charlton Athletic	42	19	11	12	77	63	1.222	49

Source: World Football
Rules for classification: 1) Points; 2) Goal average; 3) Goals scored
(C) Champions

== Results ==
Arsenal's score comes first

Win	Draw	Loss

=== Football League First Division ===
Date	Opponent	Venue	Result	Attendance	Scorers
23 August 1952	Aston Villa	A	2–1	50,930	Oakes, Lishman
27 August 1952	Manchester United	H	2–1	57,831	Cox, Goring
30 August 1952	Sunderland	H	1–2	56,873	Lishman
3 September 1952	Manchester United	A	0–0	39,193	
6 September 1952	Wolverhampton Wanderers	A	1–1	43,371	Roper
10 September 1952	Portsmouth	H	3–1	39,743	Milton, Goring, Roper
13 September 1952	Charlton Athletic	H	3–4	60,102	Daniel, Milton, Goring
17 September 1952	Portsmouth	A	2–2	37,356	Holton 2
20 September 1952	Tottenham Hotspur	A	3–1	69,247	Milton, Logie, Goring
27 September 1952	Derby County	A	0–2	24,582	
4 October 1952	Blackpool	H	3–1	66,642	Logie, Roper 2
11 October 1952	Sheffield Wednesday	H	2–2	54,678	Logie, Roper
25 October 1952	Newcastle United	H	3–0	63,744	Lishman, Roper 2
1 November 1952	West Bromwich Albion	A	0–2	48,061	
8 November 1952	Middlesbrough	H	2–1	48,564	Milton, Holton
15 November 1952	Liverpool	A	5–1	45,010	Holton 3, Marden 2
22 November 1952	Manchester City	H	3–1	38,161	Logie 2, Lishman
29 November 1952	Stoke City	A	1–1	24,057	Holton
13 December 1952	Burnley	A	1–1	32,753	Milton
20 December 1952	Aston Villa	H	3–1	30,064	Holton, Lishman, Roper
25 December 1952	Bolton Wanderers	A	6–4	45,432	Daniel, Milton, Logie, Holton 2, Roper
3 January 1953	Sunderland	A	1–3	54,912	Lishman
17 January 1953	Wolverhampton Wanderers	H	5–3	57,983	Daniel, Milton, Logie, Lishman 2
24 January 1953	Charlton Athletic	A	2–2	66,555	Lishman, Roper
7 February 1953	Tottenham Hotspur	H	4–0	69,051	Logie, Holton 2, Lishman
18 February 1953	Derby County	H	6–2	32,681	Daniel 2, Holton 2, Lishman 2
21 February 1953	Blackpool	A	2–3	30,034	Mercer, Goring
2 March 1953	Sheffield Wednesday	A	4–1	32,814	Holton 4
7 March 1953	Cardiff City	H	0–1	59,780	
14 March 1953	Newcastle United	A	2–2	51,618	Lishman 2
19 March 1953	Preston North End	H	1–1	33,597	Mercer
21 March 1953	West Bromwich Albion	H	2–2	49,078	Holton, Roper
28 March 1953	Middlesbrough	A	0–2	25,911	
3 April 1953	Chelsea	A	1–1	72,614	Goring
4 April 1953	Liverpool	H	5–3	39,564	Goring, Lishman, Roper 2, Hughes (og)
6 April 1953	Chelsea	H	2–0	40,536	Lishman, Marden
11 April 1953	Manchester City	A	4–2	50,018	Roper, Logie, Goring 2
15 April 1953	Bolton Wanderers	H	4–1	35,381	Goring, Lishman 2, Marden
18 April 1953	Stoke City	H	3–1	47,376	Lishman 3
22 April 1953	Cardiff City	A	0–0	57,893	
25 April 1953	Preston North End	A	0–2	39,537	
1 May 1953	Burnley	H	3–2	51,586	Forbes, Logie, Lishman

=== FA Cup ===
Round	Date	Opponent	Venue	Result	Attendance	Goalscorers
R3	10 January 1953	Doncaster Rovers	H	4–0	57,443	Logie, Holton, Lishman, Roper
R4	31 January 1953	Bury	H	6–2	45,071	Milton, Logie, Holton, Lishman, Roper, Daniel (og)
R5	14 February 1953	Burnley	A	2–0	52,122	Holton, Lishman
R6	28 February 1953	Blackpool	H	1–2	69,158	Logie
