= Josh Nichols =

English footballer (born 2006)

Personal information
- Full name: Joshua Joel Ayobami Nichols
- Date of birth: 26 July 2006 (age 20)
- Place of birth: Newham, England
- Height: 5 ft 5 in (1.65 m)
- Position: Right-back

Team information
- Current team: Kustošija
- Number: 51

Youth career
- 2014–2024: Arsenal

Senior career*
Years	Team	Apps	(Gls)
2024–2026	Arsenal	0	(0)
2026–	Kustošija	2	(0)
- * Club domestic league appearances and goals as of 19:33, 6 September 2026 (UTC)

Joshua Joel Ayobami Nichols (born 26 July 2006) is an English professional footballer who plays as a right-back for Prva NL club Kustošija.

== Career ==
A right-back, he had trials at Chelsea, Tottenham and West Ham before joining Arsenal aged eight. He signed a professional contract with Arsenal in July 2024. That summer, he played with the Arsenal first team on their pre-season tour, impressing in a friendly against Manchester United.

He made his professional debut on 25 September 2024, starting in a 5–1 EFL Cup win against Bolton Wanderers.

== Personal life ==
Nichols was born in the London Borough of Newham and supported Arsenal as a child. He later lived in Essex. Although born in England, he is reportedly eligible to play internationally for Nigeria through his mother and Jamaica and Guyana through his father.
