= 2025–26 Arsenal F.C. season =

English football club season

Arsenal F.C.
2025–26 season
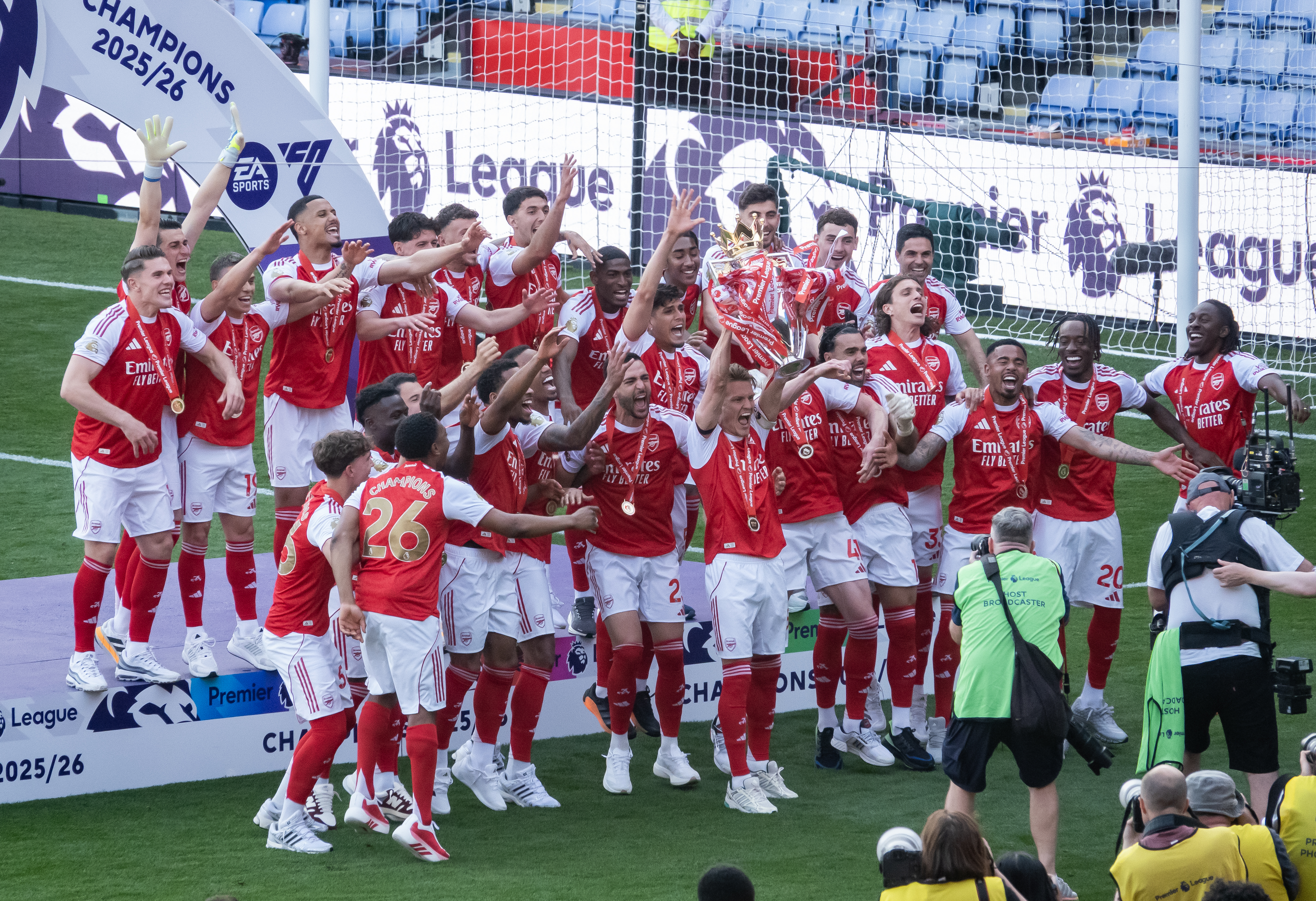
- Arsenal being crowned Premier League champions on 24 May 2026
- Owner: Kroenke Sports & Entertainment
- Co-chairmen: Stan Kroenke; Josh Kroenke
- Manager: Mikel Arteta
- Stadium: Emirates Stadium
- Premier League: 1st
- FA Cup: Quarter-finals
- EFL Cup: Runners-up
- UEFA Champions League: Runners-up
- Top goalscorer: League: Viktor Gyökeres (14); All: Viktor Gyökeres (21)
- Highest home attendance: 60,345 v Tottenham Hotspur (23 Nov 2025, Premier League)
- Lowest home attendance: 50,200 v Kairat (28 Jan 2026, UEFA Champions League)
- Average home league attendance: 60,217
- Biggest win: 5–0 v Leeds United (Home, 23 Aug 2025, Premier League)
- Biggest defeat: 0–2 v Manchester City (Neutral, 22 Mar 2026, EFL Cup)
Home colours	Away colours	Third colours

The 2025–26 season was Arsenal Football Club's 34th season in the Premier League, their 100th consecutive season in the top flight of English football, becoming the first team to spend 100 seasons straight in the English top flight, and 109th season in the top flight overall. In addition to the domestic league, Arsenal also participated in the FA Cup, EFL Cup and UEFA Champions League, the latter of which was their 40th European campaign. The season covers the period from 1 July 2025 to 30 June 2026.

On 19 May 2026, Arsenal were crowned as Premier League champions with a game left to play after title rivals Manchester City drew 1–1 to Bournemouth, resulting in Arsenal's first league title since the 2003–04 Invincible season and 14th title overall (4th in the Premier League era). The club officially celebrated their title triumph after their concluding match victory against Crystal Palace on 24 May.

== Review ==
=== Background ===
Arsenal's 2024–25 campaign was heavily affected by injuries and suspensions. The club did not sign any player in the winter transfer window, after sporting director Edu Gaspar suddenly resigned midway through the season.

The Gunners won twenty Premier League games in 2024–25, which was eight less than the previous campaign. They dropped 21 points from winning positions in the competition that season, their joint-worst record in a single campaign. Arsenal lost four Premier League matches that campaign – one less than the previous season. That represented their lowest loss total in a top-flight campaign since 2007–08. For a second consecutive season, they held the division's best defensive record, conceding a league-low 34 times. Arteta's side finished as Premier League runners-up for the third consecutive campaign, becoming the first club to achieve this twice in English top flight history after also doing so between 1999 and 2001. Kai Havertz finished the season as the Gunners' top scorer in the league with nine goals. It was the first time in 101 years since the 1923–24 season in which Arsenal did not have a player score at least 10 league goals.

Arsenal started their 21st Champions League season since 1992–93 in September 2024. They finished third in the league phase in January 2025 and bypassed February's play-off round to go straight to the last 16. The Gunners completed a 5–1 aggregate triumph over the reigning Champions League champions Real Madrid in the quarter-finals, reaching the semi-finals of the competition for the first time since 2008–09. After a 3–1 aggregate loss to French side Paris Saint-Germain, Arteta's side were eliminated from the Champions League at the semi-final stage.

=== Pre-season ===
On 6 June and 26 June respectively, the club announced new long-term contracts for Brazilian defender Gabriel Magalhães and Academy graduate Myles Lewis-Skelly. Gabriel, at the time of signing the contract, was the leading Premier League goalscorer amongst defenders since his debut in 2020; Lewis-Skelly enjoyed a breakthrough season, becoming the youngest starter for the club in the UEFA Champions League for 13 years. On 8 August, Arsenal announced the long-term contract renewal of another Academy graduate in Ethan Nwaneri. At the time of his renewal, he remained Arsenal's youngest ever appearance maker at the age of 15 years and 181 days and left a big impression on the first team last season with nine goals in all competitions.

On 8 July, Arsenal announced the appointment of former Argentinian defender Gabriel Heinze as a first team assistant coach, replacing Carlos Cuesta who departed the club to become the Head Coach of Serie A side Parma on 19 June. Heinze and Arteta were previously teammates at Paris Saint-Germain in the 2001–02 season.

Arsenal took part in the Singapore Festival of Football between 23 and 27 July, which consisted of matches against European heavyweights AC Milan and fellow Premier League side Newcastle United in the National Stadium of Singapore. Against the Italian side a first-time cross from Jakub Kiwior, that was tapped in at the back post by Bukayo Saka 8 minutes into the second half, was enough to secure a narrow 1–0 win. In the subsequent mandatory penalty shoot-out, three saves from debutant Kepa were not enough to stop Arsenal losing the shootout 6–5, with misses from captain Martin Ødegaard, Reiss Nelson, Kiwior and academy centre-back Marli Salmon. The Gunners then made it back-to-back wins as they ran out as 3–2 victors over Newcastle United. A goal from Mikel Merino and an own goal from Alex Murphy two minutes later, overturned a 6th-minute opener from Anthony Elanga inside the first 35 minutes of the match. A shot from distance was enough for Jacob Murphy to draw the Tyneside club level partway through the second half, before a powerful run from 15-year-old Max Dowman drew a penalty for a push from Joelinton. Ødegaard made no mistake from the spot 6 minutes from time and sealed the one-goal victory.

Arsenal's Asian Tour then saw the squad travel to Hong Kong to play the first North London derby outside of the UK in the history of the rivalry. On the stroke of half-time, Lewis-Skelly was dispossessed by Pape Matar Sarr in a crowded midfield. David Raya, who had played the initial pass to Lewis-Skelly, was consequently caught high up the pitch, thus allowing Sarr to execute a well-taken long-range lob. Despite taking 16 shots on the night, Arsenal were unable to overturn the deficit as Tottenham secured the 1–0 victory, thus condemning The Gunners to their first loss of pre-season.

The club's pre-season schedule was then rounded off with two home friendlies against Spanish sides Villarreal and Athletic Bilbao. The first of these friendlies resulted in a second consecutive single-goal loss as goals from Christian Nørgaard, his first for the club, and Ødegaard from the spot, following another penalty-earning action from Dowman, were not enough to overturn the deficit created by goals from former Gunner Nicolas Pépé, youngster Karl Etta Eyong and former North London rival Arnaut Danjuma. Following their 3–2 win, The Yellow Submarine also ran out 4–3 winners in the subsequent penalty shoot-out, as despite yet another shoot-out save from Kepa, misses from Merino, Gabriel Magalhães and debutant Madueke proved crucial. The Emirates Cup fixture against Athletic Bilbao, which occurred eight days before the club's Premier League opener at Old Trafford, then resulted in The Gunners running out as comfortable 3–0 winners. New signings Zubimendi and Gyökeres combined for the opening goal, as the Swedish striker planted a header into the far side of the goal following a first-time cross from the Spaniard. Incisive football then saw Gabriel Martinelli put through on goal and set up Saka for a calm side foot finish into an unguarded net. Kai Havertz rounded off the scoring with a powerful run and an accomplished left foot strike, low and across the goalkeeper. The subsequent penalty shootout saw Raya make one save and Arsenal score six of their seven penalties to win 6–5. The Player of the Match, Zubimendi, scored the decisive winning penalty.

==== First team transfers (summer transfer window) ====
The Premier League summer transfer window ran from 1 June to 10 June (due to an exceptional registration period mandated by FIFA for the Club World Cup), and then between 16 June and 1 September 2025.

Arsenal confirmed on 4 June that they were to release twenty players, two of whom, Kieran Tierney and Jorginho, had made 144 and 79 appearances for the Gunners' first team in all competitions respectively.

On 5 June, the club confirmed that Portuguese defender Nuno Tavares, who had spent the entire previous season on loan with Serie A side Lazio, joined the Italian team on a permanent transfer, for a previously agreed fee reported to be €9 million (£7.6 million). It was then confirmed four days later that another loan had been made permanent as Brazilian forward Marquinhos, who had been on loan at Série A side Cruzeiro since January 2025, joined the Brazilian club in a permanent transfer for a reported fee of £3 million.

On 1 July, the club confirmed that they had completed their first signing of the summer (and under new Sporting Director Andrea Berta) as 30-year-old Spanish goalkeeper Kepa Arrizabalaga joined from London rivals Chelsea on a long-term deal. The goalkeeper had spent the past two seasons on loan at Real Madrid (where he won La Liga, the Supercopa de España and the UEFA Champions League) and Bournemouth. Arsenal activated a £5 million release clause in his Chelsea contract to complete the deal. Kepa became the seventeenth Spaniard to play for the club and remained, at the time of his signing, the most expensive goalkeeper ever purchased, after his £72 million move to Chelsea in 2018.

On 4 July, the club confirmed that a mutual agreement had been reached to terminate the contract of Japanese international Takehiro Tomiyasu twelve months early after injuries had limited the defender's availability on the pitch in the past two seasons. Tomiyasu made 84 appearances at the club and was awarded the club's Player of the Month in both September 2021 and October 2023.

On 6 July, the club confirmed their second signing of the summer window as 26-year-old Spanish midfielder Martín Zubimendi joined from Basque side Real Sociedad on a long-term deal. Arsenal agreed to pay €5 million above the stipulated release clause in Zubimendi's contract to enable the transfer fee to be paid in multiple instalments, thus bringing the total figure up to €65 million (£55.8 million). Zubimendi had connections to multiple club personnel at the time of joining, having been born in the same city and played for the same youth club as manager Mikel Arteta, whilst also having made appearances alongside Raya, Ødegaard and Merino (169 with the latter) at club and international level.

Just four days later the club confirmed their third summer signing as 31-year-old Danish midfielder Christian Nørgaard joined from fellow Premier League and London club Brentford on a long-term contract. The deal for the Bees' captain was concluded for an initial fee of £10 million with potential performance related add-ons totalling £2 million. As was the case for the two previous signings of the summer, Nørgaard joined forces with a former teammate, having played alongside Raya for four years at Brentford.

The club's fourth signing, and second from Chelsea, of the summer window was confirmed on 18 July, as 23-year-old English forward Noni Madueke joined on a long-term contract. The Gunners agreed to pay an initial fee of £48.5 million, rising to £52 million with potential add-ons. Whilst the signing was not initially deemed popular by sections of the fanbase, manager Mikel Arteta lauded the signing of "one of the most talented wide forward players in the Premier League".

On 24 July, the club confirmed their fifth signing of the summer window as 21-year-old Spanish defender Cristhian Mosquera joined from La Liga side Valencia on a long-term deal. The deal was concluded for a total package reported to be under €20 million, consisting of an initial fee of €15 million (£13 million). Mosquera arrived in North London with experience beyond his years; since becoming the youngest centre back in Valencia's history at the time of his debut, he had gone on to be an almost ever-present feature of their defence for the past two seasons.

Just two days later, Arsenal confirmed their sixth signing of the summer window at 27-year-old Swedish striker Viktor Gyökeres joined from Portuguese side Sporting on a long-term deal. After protracted negotiations, the deal was concluded for an initial fee of €63.5 million (£55 million) plus an additional €10 million (£8.7 million) in potential add-ons. Over the course of his two years at Sporting, Gyökeres became one of the most prolific strikers in Europe, netting 97 times in 102 games, winning the Title and Golden Boot in back-to-back seasons. Such was the profile of his signing that demand for Gyokeres' number 14 shirt exceeded that of any signing in the club's history, breaking sales records and momentarily crashing the club's official website.

The club's outgoings (aside from contract expirations and terminations) began on 22 August, as Karl Hein departed for Bundesliga side Werder Bremen on a season-long loan. It was the Estonian's third separate loan away from the club since joining in 2018.

As the transfer window neared its conclusion, Arsenal announced their seventh signing on 23 August, as former Academy graduate Eberechi Eze re-joined the club following his release at the age of 13. Eze signed from fellow London club Crystal Palace on a long-term contract for an initial fee of £60 million plus an additional £7.5 million in potential add-ons (which, at that time, represented the club's third largest total-package purchase in their history). Having joined the club on the back of North London rivals Tottenham Hotspur agreeing a deal for the player, whilst also echoing the move of club legend Ian Wright from South to North London, Eze was heavily revered by the fanbase during his unveiling to the Emirates crowd prior to kick off in the first home game of the season against Leeds United.

In what proved to be a very busy deadline day, the club announced the departures of six players starting with Albert Sambi Lokonga joining German side Hamburger SV in a permanent deal, having spent much of his four years at the club away on loan. Jakub Kiwior departed in a loan deal to Portuguese side Porto which included a €2 million (£1.7 million) loan fee, an obligation to make the move permanent for a total package worth €22 million (£19 million) inclusive of add-ons, plus a payment of €2 million (£1.7 million) if Kiwior secures a move away from Porto in the future. Kiwior made 68 appearances across two and a half years at the club and was a notable member of the defence that went to the UEFA Champions League Semi finals in the previous season. Two long-standing members of the squad, having each made 90+ appearances for the club, then departed on loan as Oleksandr Zinchenko and Reiss Nelson joined Premier League sides Nottingham Forest and Brentford respectively. Nelson had graduated from the club's academy and had been at the club for 17 years at the time of his departure. Lastly, Fábio Vieira joined Lokonga as he made a loan move to Hamburger SV, with an option to make the move permanent, and Academy player Lucas Nygaard make the loan switch to Danish 2nd Division side Brabrand.

Compensating for Kiwior's loan move to Porto, the club then announced their eighth and final signing of the summer window, as Ecuadorian defender Piero Hincapié joined in a season-long loan move from Bayer Leverkusen. The deal included an option to make the move permanent for a total package of €52 million (£45 million). Hincapié played a crucial part in Leverkusen's Invincible run to the League and Cup double in the 2023–24 season, and upon his signing, became the first Ecuadorian in history to represent the club.

=== August ===

Starting XI (4–3–3 formation) for Premier League away match against Manchester United on 17 August

Arsenal began the Premier League season with a 0–1 away win against rivals Manchester United at Old Trafford. Riccardo Calafiori scored the match's only goal with a close-range header, converting Declan Rice's inswinging corner after United goalkeeper Altay Bayindir failed to deal with it. This result extended Arsenal's unbeaten run against Manchester United in the Premier League to six games, the last defeat coming on 4 September 2022.

On 23 August 2025, Arsenal secured their first home victory of the season, defeating newly promoted Leeds United 5–0 at the Emirates Stadium. Jurrien Timber scored twice, both from corner situations, and also provided an assist for Saka, who finished with a strike from his weaker foot. In the second half, summer signing Gyökeres scored his first goal for the club, making a brilliant solo run past multiple Leeds defenders before slotting home a through ball from Calafiori into the near bottom corner. The game saw Max Dowman make his Premier League debut, coming on as a substitute for Arsenal in the 64th minute of their match, becoming the second youngest player in the league's history at 15 years and 235 days, behind only teammate Nwaneri. He won a penalty for his team in the third minute of stoppage time, with Gyokeres converting it for his brace.

Arsenal suffered their first defeat of the season, losing 0–1 to Liverpool at Anfield on 31 August. With an injury-hit squad, Mikel Arteta started Merino and Madueke as replacements for the unavailable Ødegaard and Saka. Arsenal suffered an early setback four minutes into the match, with Saliba leaving the field due to injury and being replaced by summer signing Mosquera. Both sides struggled to create chances until Dominik Szoboszlai scored a 30-yard free-kick in the final ten minutes. The result ended Arsenal's 22-game unbeaten streak against Top Six opposition, a run that had begun on 2 May 2023.

Arsenal had an injury-hit August, with Havertz, Saka, Ødegaard, and Saliba all sustaining injuries during these matches, sidelining them for weeks or, in some cases, months.

=== September ===
Fifteen Arsenal players, excluding those out on loan, were called up to their national senior squads for international fixtures in September: Rice, Madueke, Lewis-Skelly and Eze (England); Raya, Zubimendi and Merino (Spain); Gabriel Magalhães and Martinelli (Brazil); Gyökeres (Sweden); Trossard (Belgium); Calafiori (Italy); Timber (Netherlands); Ødegaard (Norway, captain); and Hincapié (Ecuador).

Starting XI (4–3–3 formation) for Champions League away match against Athletic Bilbao on 16 September

On 13 September, returning from the international break, Arsenal secured their third league win with a 3–0 victory over Nottingham Forest, with Zubimendi scoring his first brace in top-flight football, Gyökeres netting his third goal in four league games, and Raya making his 100th appearance for the club. On 16 September 2025, Arsenal began their Champions League campaign with a 0–2 away win against Athletic Bilbao.

On 21 September, Arsenal played Manchester City in the Premier League at the Emirates Stadium. Erling Haaland gave City an early lead from a counter-attack, but Arsenal equalised late on when substitute Martinelli lobbed Gianluigi Donnarumma after a pass from Eze. The match ended 1–1, with Mikel Arteta becoming the first manager to avoid defeat in five consecutive league games against Pep Guardiola.

Arsenal began their 2025–26 EFL Cup campaign in the third round with a 0–2 away win against League One side Port Vale on 24 September. The match marked Kepa's competitive debut for the club, with Eze also scoring his first goal for Arsenal.

On 29 September, Arsenal secured a 1–2 away win against Newcastle United in the Premier League, moving into second place and closing the gap to leaders Liverpool to two points. Newcastle opened the scoring in the 34th minute when Nick Woltemade headed in a cross from Sandro Tonali past Raya, with Gabriel Magalhães partially at fault for failing to challenge effectively. In the 84th minute, Merino headed in a cross from Rice to level the scores, before Gabriel Magalhães scored a stoppage-time header from a corner to secure a win for Arsenal, redeeming himself for his earlier involvement in Newcastle's opener. With the win, Arsenal put an end to their three-game losing streak at St James' Park.

=== October ===

Starting XI (4–2–3–1 formation) for Premier League away match against Fulham on 18 October

Arsenal began the month with a 2–0 home win against Olympiacos in the Champions League on 1 October. Martinelli opened the scoring in the 12th minute with a tap-in after Gyökeres's effort struck the post, before Saka sealed the victory in second-half stoppage time with a low finish between the legs of Olympiacos goalkeeper Konstantinos Tzolakis.

On 4 October, the Gunners welcomed fellow London side West Ham United to the Emirates. Rice opened the scoring in the 38th minute against his former club, following a saved Eze shot. In the 66th minute, Arsenal were awarded a penalty as Hammers defender Malick Diouf hauled Timber down in the box. Saka successfully converted, giving the Gunners a comfortable two goal cushion with half an hour to play. West Ham could not find a breakthrough throughout the remainder of the match, as Arsenal became the league leaders with 18 points heading into the second international break of the season.

Fifteen Arsenal players (excluding players who were loaned out) were named in their respective countries' senior squads for international fixtures in October: Rice, Saka, Lewis-Skelly and Eze (England); Raya, Zubimendi and Merino (Spain); Gabriel Magalhães and Martinelli (Brazil); Gyökeres (Sweden); Trossard (Belgium); Calafiori (Italy); Timber (Netherlands); Saliba (France); and Nørgaard (Denmark).

With the conclusion of the international break, Arsenal traveled to Craven Cottage on 18 October to face Fulham in the league. A goal from Leandro Trossard in the second half gave the Gunners a 1–0 victory. On 21 October, Arsenal returned to the Emirates to host Spanish La Liga giants Atlético Madrid in the Champions League. Goals from Gabriel, Martinelli, and a brace from Gyökeres handed the Gunners a 4–0 win over the visitors. This triumph meant Arsenal had amassed 9 points from a possible 9 in the league phase, placing them fourth in the league standings.

On 26 October, Arsenal played Crystal Palace at the Emirates for their second London Derby in eight days. In a relatively tame match, Eze netted the only goal, against his former club. The result meant the Gunners were now four points clear of second position Bournemouth in the league, coming after slip-ups from Manchester City and title-defenders Liverpool.

Arsenal followed their success against Palace with a 2–0 home defeat of Brighton in the Carabao Cup, with goals from Nwaneri and Saka sending them into the Quarter-Finals of the tournament. Arteta rotated the squad heavily, handing out first competitive starts to Hale End products Dowman and Andre Harriman-Annous, along with new signing Hincapié. The Gunners were later drawn to Crystal Palace for the Quarter-Finals of the cup, whom they had beaten three days prior.

=== November ===

Starting XI (4–2–3–1 formation) for Champions League home match against Bayern Munich on 26 November

The Gunners started the month with a 0–2 away win against newly promoted side Burnley on 1 November, with two headers in the first half from Gyökeres and Rice. Trossard made his 100th appearance in the league for Arsenal, having already done so at Brighton & Hove Albion.

On 4 November, Arteta's men made the trip to Czechia for their Champions League fixture against Slavia Prague. The Gunners proved to be too strong for the Czech First League champions, and courtesy of a Merino brace and Saka penalty, came away with a 3–0 victory, shooting them up to 2nd place in the league standings. This success marked the first time Arsenal had kept eight clean sheets in a row in all competitions since 1903, and the first time Arteta had won ten in a row in his managerial career. Hale End products Dowman and Harriman-Annous came on in the second half, with the former becoming the youngest Champions League player in history at 15 years and 308 days old.

Following their triumph in Prague, Arsenal traveled to the Stadium of Light for their league match against 4th-placed Sunderland. Their newly promoted opponents were captained by former Gunner Granit Xhaka, whom had departed the North London side two years prior for Bayer Leverkusen. The hosts gained a 1–0 lead heading into the interval, with a Dan Ballard finish past Raya in the 36th minute. In the second half, the Gunners returned to the pitch with a renewed energy, finding the back of the net twice in twenty minutes owing to strikes from Saka and Trossard. However, despite having seemingly completing the turnaround, the visitors were unable to hold on to their advantage as Sunderland substitute Brian Brobbey equalised in stoppage time with an overhead kick. The 2–2 draw ended Arsenal's winning run and reduced their lead on 2nd-placed Manchester City to four points, heading into the third and final international break of the year.

Thirteen Arsenal players (excluding players who were loaned out) joined up with their respective countries' senior squads for international fixtures in October: Rice, Saka, and Eze (England); Raya, Zubimendi and Merino (Spain); Gabriel Magalhães (Brazil); Trossard (Belgium); Calafiori (Italy); Timber (Netherlands); Saliba (France); Nørgaard (Denmark); and Hincapié (Ecuador).

On 23 November, the Gunners continued their Premier League campaign with a North London derby at home against Tottenham Hotspur. With Gabriel Magalhães out injured, Arteta handed summer recruit Hincapié his first league start. In the 36th minute, Trossard gave the hosts a 1–0 advantage with a turn and shot inside the box. This was followed by a second goal from a right-footed Eze shot shortly before the interval. At the start of the second half, Eze doubled up to make it three for the Gunners, finishing into the bottom-corner of Tottenham goalkeeper Guglielmo Vicario's net. In the 54th minute, opposing striker Richarlison beat Raya from long range to reduce the deficit to two, but Arsenal's three-goal advantage was restored as Eze netted his third of the night, rounding off his first career hat-trick and a 4–1 pounding of the visitors.

Arsenal hosted reigning Bundesliga champions Bayern Munich in a blockbuster Champions League league phase fixture on 26 November. Both sides were even on twelve points in the league standings heading into the match, with four wins apiece. Arteta made two adjustments to the squad that had defeated Tottenham Hotspur three days prior, replacing Hincapié with Mosquera at centre-back, and Calafiori with Lewis-Skelly at left-back. After a period of relatively cagey opening exchanges, the Gunners took the lead as Timber nodded in Saka's corner from close range. However, succeeding a wasted Eze opportunity to double the lead, Bayern youngster Lennart Karl equalised at the other end to level the score 1–1. Following the break, Arsenal began churning out chances, with Saka, Merino, Mosquera, and Rice all squandering attempts to retake the advantage. Finally, in the 69th minute, subtitutes Calafiori and Madueke combined to provide the breakthrough for the Gunners, with the former assisting the latter's first goal for the club. Another of Arteta's changes, Martinelli, also made an impact, as he made a run to receive Eze's lofted pass, before beating Bayern goalkeeper Manuel Neuer near the halfway line and finishing into an empty net to complete the 3–1 victory. This success placed Arsenal top of the league phase standings, and dealt Bayern's first defeat of the season.

On 30 November, the Gunners crossed the capital to face 3rd-placed Chelsea away at the Stamford Bridge. After a goalless first half that saw Chelsea midfielder Moisés Caicedo sent off for a challenge on Merino, Trevor Chalobah gave the hosts the lead with a header past Raya in the 48th minute. The visitors responded eleven minutes later, with Merino nodding in a Saka cross for the equaliser. Arteta's side were unable to find a winner for the remainder of the half and were forced to settle with a 1–1 stalemate, with 2nd position Manchester City shortening the gap between them to five points.

=== December ===

Starting XI (4–3–3 formation) for Premier League home match against Wolves on 13 December

The Gunners began the month with a home match against Brentford on 3 December. White and Ødegaard were named in the starting XI together for the first time since 17 August, when both started the opening fixture of the campaign against Manchester United. Merino gave the hosts an early lead, heading in a cross from White in the 11th minute. In second-half stoppage time, substitute Saka sealed the victory with a shot off Brentford goalkeeper Caoimhín Kelleher. The 2–0 result was Arsenal's fourth consecutive league win at the Emirates, their longest run of successive home league wins since a string of 5 triumphs in April 2024.

On 6 December, Arsenal traveled to Villa Park to face 3rd position Aston Villa in the league. In the 36th minute, Matty Cash broke the deadlock in favor of Villa, striking between the legs of Raya. Arteta made two changes during the break, with Trossard and Gyökeres replacing Eze and Merino. The former made an immediate impact, finishing a Saka cross to equalise on 52 minutes. However, Arteta's men were unable to find a crucial second goal, and Emiliano Buendía scored the winner for the hosts in the 4th minute of injury time. The defeat ended the visitors' 18-match unbeaten run in all competitions.

The Gunners returned to the Champions League on 10 December, away to Club Brugge. In the 24th minute, Madueke recovered possession just inside the Brugge half, and netted a spectacular goal into the top-right corner from 25 yards out. Late on in the first half, Raya made several crucial saves to deny the hosts an equaliser. Arteta's side had the dream start after the interval, with Zubimendi finding an unmarked Madueke to score a second for the visitors. Martinelli followed suit in the 55th minute, curling in a stunner from outside the box. This goal made the Brazilian the first ever Arsenal player to score goals in five consecutive Champions League appearances. Gabriel Jesus came on just after the hour, making his competitive return after 332 days out with an anterior cruciate ligament injury. At 16 years and 103 days, Marli Salmon became the second-youngest Englishman in Champions League history, making his debut in the closing stages of the second half. The match ended 3–0.

On 13 December, the Gunners welcomed Wolves to the Emirates in a top-against-bottom league matchup. The visitors were able to frustrate Arteta's men, whom were unable to find the back of the net in the first half. The breakthrough finally came in the 70th minute, with a Saka corner ricocheting off the post, onto the back of Wolves goalkeeper Sam Johnstone, and into the goal. Wolves began to pressure the hosts after the opener, culminating in a 90th minute headed finish from Tolu Arokodare. The away side's jubilation would be short lived, however, as Saka forced in an own goal once again, this time his delivery striking opposing defender Yerson Mosquera and finding the target. The 2–1 victory meant that Arsenal retained their 2-point gap at the top of the league summit.

Arteta's men followed this success with a trip to Hill Dickinson Stadium, the new home of 10th-placed Everton. A handball from opposing defender Jake O'Brien inside the box handed Arsenal a 27th-minute penalty, which was powerfully dispatched by Gyökeres. In the second half, Trossard was fed a through pass by Rice and unleashed a potent shot onto the post. The visitors missed many key chances to double their lead, but saw out a crucial triumph to remain ahead of 2nd position Manchester City.

On 23 December, the Gunners returned to the Emirates to face Crystal Palace in the quarter-final round of the Carabao Cup. Arteta posted a rotated lineup, opting for a frontline of Martinelli, Jesus, and Madueke. Arsenal gradually built up pressure following the opening stages of the match, with Martinelli, Calafiori, Jesus, Timber, and Madueke all exchanging chances. Palace keeper Walter Benítez made several key saves to deny the hosts the advantage. The South London visitors emerged a different side after the break, as opposing manager Oliver Glasner chose to bring on Justin Devenny and Nathaniel Clyne in place of first-half strugglers Edward Nketiah and Jaydee Canvot. These changes certainly helped the Eagles, whom were able to prevent any Arsenal breakthrough for a greater period of the second half. In the 80th minute, the Gunners would finally break this resistance, forcing an own goal from a corner through opposing defender Maxence Lacroix. However, deep into stoppage time, Palace captain Marc Guehi was able to equalise with a close-range finish, forcing a penalty shootout. The ensuring shootout was of high quality, with both teams' first seven spot-kicks finding the back of the net. Saliba successfully beat Benitez for Arsenal's eighth, but Lacroix's attempt was palmed away by Arrizabalaga, sending Arteta's men to a second consecutive Carabao Cup semi-final, where they would play London rivals Chelsea.

Arsenal returned to league action with a 2–1 home win over Brighton & Hove Albion on 27 December. A first-half strike from Ødegaard and an own goal by Georginio Rutter gave Arteta's side a comfortable two-goal advantage before the hour mark, but the visitors rebounded, scoring through Paraguayan Diego Gómez in the 64th minute. The Seagulls unsuccessfully pushed for an equaliser, with Yankuba Minteh's curling shot saved by Raya and Mats Wieffer's header missing the target. The Gunners were able to see another win out, securing a pivotal three points in the title race.

The Gunners finished 2025 with their second match of the month against 3rd position Aston Villa. Ollie Watkins missed several golden opportunities to put the visiting side ahead, leaving the scoreline level at 0–0 heading into the break. On 48 minutes, Gabriel found the opener, pouncing on an error from former teammate Emiliano Martínez to nod home a Saka corner. At 52 minutes, Zubimendi was sent through by Ødegaard, tucking a slick outside-the-boot finish past Martínez to find a second for the hosts. Trossard then turned the two goal advantage into three, unleashing from 20 yards to find the bottom-right corner. Substitute Jesus added a fourth goal, his first since 1 January, latching onto a Trossard ball in the 78th minute before turning it into the net. In stoppage time, Watkins netted a consolation from close range, as Villa's winning run was put to an end by a rampant Arsenal.

=== January ===

Starting XI (4–3–3 formation) for Premier League home match against Manchester United on 25 January

Arsenal began 2026 with a trip to the South Coast to face Bournemouth on 3 January. Wingers Saka and Trossard were rotated out in favor of Madueke and Martinelli, who were entrused to service Gyökeres in the center. On 10 minutes, a lapse in concentration from Gabriel saw the Brazilian centre-half play a square pass straight to Evanilson, who calmly dispatched it past an out-of-position Raya. The Gunners would not be trailing for long, however, as a ricocheted Martinelli shot from a Madueke cross fell kindly to Gabriel, who redeemed himself with a first-time volley into the left side of the net. In the 54th minute, Ødegaard laid off Rice near the edge of the box, who scored to give the visitors the lead. Substitute Saka was then fed by Ødegaard, with the former cutting the ball back to Rice to score a third and his second of the night. The hosts responded with a stunner from Eli Junior Kroupi, which set up a tense ending in which Arteta's side pulled through to secure another critical three points in the league.

On 8 January, the Gunners played reigning champions Liverpool at home. The hosts had the better of the first half, but were short of a cutting edge and failed to score. Arsenal were unable to carry the same momentum into the second period with Liverpool grew into control. The match ended goalless.

On 11 January, Arsenal began their 2025–26 FA Cup campaign in the third round, facing EFL Championship side Portsmouth away. Colby Bishop gave the home side a shock lead early on with a close-range finish past Arrizabalaga, but Arsenal were quick to respond, forcing an own goal by Andre Dozzell. The visitors gradually swept aside Pompey through a Martinelli hattrick, despite a Madueke missed penalty. The 1–4 result propelled Arsenal to the fourth round of the competition, where they would be drawn to EFL League One side Wigan Athletic.

Arteta's men crossed the capital to face rivals Chelsea for the EFL Cup semi-final first leg on 14 January. White's header gave the Gunners an early advantage, an advantage doubled by Gyökeres's tap-in on 49 minutes. Alejandro Garnacho pulled one back for the home side shortly after, striking between the legs of Arrizabalaga. Zubimendi restored the two-goal cushion with a composed finish in the 71st minute, before Garnacho struck again to end the tie 2–3 in favor of the visitors heading into the second leg on 3 February.

Three days later, Arsenal faced Nottingham Forest away at the City Ground in the league. Neither side could find a breakthrough heading into the interval, with Martinelli shooting beyond the far post in what was the best chance of the half. In the 65th minute, Matz Sels denied Saka in a superb save to keep the tie level, before the Gunners had a penalty chalked off after a Ola Aina handball. The result condemned Arteta's side to consecutive 0–0 draws in the league, a first since the 2012–13 season.

Arsenal played their fourth away game in ten days with a trip to San Siro to face Italian Serie A giants Inter Milan in the Champions League, a rematch of the previous season's meeting between the two sides. Arteta made seven changes to the starting lineup from December's clash with Club Brugge, notably handing Jesus his first Champions League start of the season. The decision paid off quickly, as the Brazilian centre-forward nodded in a scuffed Timber shot in the 10th minute past Yann Sommer in the Inter goal. However, the preceding season's finalists would not be brushed aside so easily, with Petar Sucic finding the top-right corner on 18 minutes to equalise. The Gunners quickly responded to this setback, as an unmarked Trossard headed in dangerously from a Saka corner for Jesus to net his second of the night. Both teams exchanged numerous chances but neither side could find the back of the net for the remainer of the half. The game looked to be headed towards a nervy ending until Gyökeres sealed the victory with a long-ranged attempt in the 84th minute, sending the visitors through automatic qualification to the Round of 16.

On 25 January, Arsenal hosted 6th position Manchester United in the league, the reverse of the fixture between the two sides on Matchweek 1. Having made his first Champions League XI of the season in midweek, Jesus was entrusted to start his first Premier League match in 386 days. The Gunners dominated the early proceedings, with Zubimendi's header drawing a fine save by Senne Lammens. A Lisandro Martínez own goal just before the half hour gave the home side a deserved advantage, although it was quickly canceled out through a Bryan Mbeumo finish following a Zubimendi giveaway. On 50th minutes, United had the lead as Patrick Dorgu's volley struck the woodwork and beat Raya, surviving a VAR check after. This forced a rare quadruple substitution from Arteta, who brought on White, Eze, Merino and Gyökeres in place of Hincapié, Ødegaard, Zubimendi, and Jesus. Merino repaid his manager in kind, netting a scrappy equaliser from point-blank range in the 84th minute. The hosts would only be briefly level, however, as Matheus Cunha dispatched an inch-perfect strike from outside the penalty area. The 2–3 defeat meant Arsenal were winless in three consecutive league games, had suffered their first competitive home loss of the campaign, and had conceded three goals in a match for the first time since a 4–3 win away at Luton Town during the 2023–24 season.

On 28 January, the Gunners played host to Kazakh club FC Kairat in the final matchweek of the Champions League league phase. With a Round of 16 spot already secured and a pivotal league match against Leeds United upcoming, Arteta opted to rotate the starting lineup. On 3 minutes, Gyökeres splashed the ball into the bottom-corner to put the home side in front, assisted by injury-returnee Kai Havertz. Kairat answered just four minutes later, with Calafiori's shirt pull on Jorginho inside the penalty area setting up the Portuguese striker's equaliser from the spot. Havertz then contributed again, cracking a left-footed shot past Temirlan Anarbekov in the away goal. Martinelli added a third with a close-ranged finish in the 36th minute. Late into the second half, Arteta handed academy product Brando Bailey-Joseph a competitive debut, substituting the 17-year-old on in place of goalscorer Gyökeres. Kairat netted a consolation in stoppage time through Ricardinho, as Arsenal completed a flawless Champions League league phase, topping the 36-team table with 8 wins out of 8 matches.

Arsenal closed January with a 0–4 success away at Leeds United, their fifth away win in all competitions in the month. Goals from Zubimendi, Madueke, Gyökeres and Jesus ended the visitors' 3-match winless streak, while restoring their 7-point lead at the top of the Premier League table.

=== February ===

Starting XI (4–3–3 formation) for Premier League away match against Tottenham Hotspur on 22 February

Arsenal returned to the Emirates to face Chelsea for the second leg of their EFL Cup semi-final tie on 3 February. A goalless first half saw Hincapié's top-corner shot palmed away by Robert Sánchez before an Enzo Fernandez attempt was dealt with through Arizzabalaga. Already leading 3–2 on aggregate, Arteta's men defended resolutely in the second period to quell any fightback from the Blues. Former Chelsea man Havertz was then brought on, finishing a superb Rice cross deep into stoppage time to send the home support into jubilation, and his team to the competition final at Wembley Stadium on 22 March.

On 7 February, Arsenal welcomed 8th-placed Sunderland to the Emirates for a pivotal match in the league title race. Havertz came close to opening the scores within thirty seconds with an off-target header, and was then involved at the other end with a potential goal-preventing block on Sunderland forward Brian Brobbey's shot. Zubimendi gave the hosts a much-needed breakthrough on 42 minutes, striking perfectly beyond opposing goalkeeper Robin Roefs at the near post. Although trailing and without the momentum heading into the second half, it was Régis Le Bris's Black Cats who emerged the brighter side following the break. Chemsdine Talbi's effort was turned away by Raya, while Gabriel was forced into a sliding challenge on Trai Hume shortly after. The Gunners were able to reassert their dominance, though, as Gyökeres was put on with half an hour remaining and quickly scored to advance the game beyond the visitors' reach. The Swedish striker then netted again in injury time, opening Arsenal's advantage at the top of the table to nine points, ahead of Manchester City's clash with Liverpool.

The Gunners continued the month with a trip to the Gtech Community Stadium to play Brentford on 12 February. Following an unsatisfactory first half performance which saw Raya make a stunning stop on Igor Thiago's header, the visitors came out of the interval with increased urgency. Madueke soon found an opener, heading against Caoimhín Kelleher's momentum in the Brentford goal. The hosts were level just 10 minutes later, with Keane Lewis-Potter finding the back of the net from a Michael Kayode long throw-in. Neither team found a cutting edge in the remainder of the match, as Arteta's side had their nine-point lead at the top of the table cut to four.

Arsenal followed through on all fronts, hosting League One club Wigan Athletic in midweek for their tie in the FA Cup fourth round on 15 February. A first-half blitz which included a Jack Hunt own goal and goals from Madueke, Martinelli, and Jesus, sent Arteta's men into the fifth round of the competition. 16-year-old Hale End product Marli Salmon made his home debut during the match, replacing Saliba just after the hour mark. Arsenal were later drawn to another League One club for the fifth round, Mansfield Town.

On 18 February, Arsenal traveled to the West Midlands to face bottom of the table Wolves at the Molineux Stadium. In the fourth minute, Saka latched onto a perfect Rice cross, heading between the legs of José Sá to give the visitors an early advantage. The Gunners had two on 56 minutes, as Gabriel fed Hincapié who turned it high into the opposition net. Rob Edwards's men were not done yet, however, as Spaniard Hugo Bueno lashed a top-corner screamer just five minutes later to halve the deficit. Deep into stoppage time, Raya spilled a cross which Tom Edozie collected. The 19-year-old debutant fired on the volley and was denied by the woodwork, only for a deflection off a desperate Calafiori to turn the ball back in past the goal line. The match ended 2–2.

Arsenal succeeded this setback with a North London Derby away against Tottenham Hotspur on 22 February. Arteta opted for two attacking changes from the Wolves draw four days prior, with Eze and Trossard coming in for Ødegaard and Madueke. The Gunners began the game with intent, with both Saliba and Gyökeres squandering great chances. But they soon had a deserved lead as Saka squeezed past Djed Spence on the byline, firing a dangerous ball near the six-yard box which was converted by Eze. Tottenham responded quickly with Randal Kolo Muani pouncing on a complacent Rice and beating Raya on 34 minutes. The second half began with communication problems involving match officials, but it was Gyökeres who caused the biggest problems for the hosts once the interval got underway. The Swede took a touch from Timber's early cross before tucking an outstanding finish home to beat a flailing Guglielmo Vicario. Two became three with a scramble inside the Spurs penalty area, as flick-ons, blocks, and ricochets settled the ball nicely for Eze who made it five goals in two matches against Arsenal's North London rivals via a cool finish into an empty net. Gyökeres sealed the victory and another brace in added time, bending into the top-right corner to send his triumphant side five points clear at the league summit.

=== March ===

Starting XI (4–2–3–1 formation) for EFL Cup Final against Manchester City on 22 March

The Gunners kicked off a busy March with a home match against Chelsea, the two sides' fourth meeting of the season. Arteta's men emerged unchanged from their previous outing against Tottenham on 22 February, with no game for both sides during the midweek. The hosts started brightly and scored through Saliba, breaking the deadlock early on just like they had one week prior. Corresponding to the Spurs game, Arsenal shot themselves in the foot again as Hincapié flicked on Reece James's corner into his own net to draw the game in first half stoppage time. Chelsea opened the second half with immense dominace, with the equaliser sucking the life out of the Emirates crowd and the home team. But just as the Gunners seemed to be losing their footing on the match, Timber nodded in a pinpoint Rice corner, securing a precious 2–1 lead. Pedro Neto was then shown a second a second yellow card for a sliding challenge on Martinelli, as Arsenal survived a late wave of pressure to secure all three points.

Arsenal played Brighton at a packed Amex Stadium on 4 March. Marking his 300th appearance for club, Saka's 9th-minute goal allowed the visitors some early breathing space, as they sustained wave after wave of Brighton attacks. The Seagulls were looking likely to equalise, before the introductions of Havertz, Trossard, and Calafiori around the hour mark helped the Gunners secure another vital three points.

Arteta's men then traveled away to Mansfield Town on 7 March for the FA Cup 5th Round. A much-changed Arsenal side from the midweek fielded the likes of 16-year-olds Dowman and Salmon playing in an unusual 3-4-3 formation. Madueke and Martinelli, the only survivors from Wednesday's league clash, combined as the latter set up the former's superb first-time, outside-the-area finish. But just 5 minutes after halftime, Mansfield were level as Will Evans raced past Mosquera before beating Arizzabalaga at his near post. Substitute Eze then found himself in space on 66 minutes, striking into the top-right corner with immense power to send the Gunners to the quarter-finals of the competition for the first time since their winning run in 2020.

On 11 March, Arsenal travelled to Germany to face Bundesliga side Bayer Leverkusen in the Champions League round of 16 first leg. On 19 minutes, Martinelli was fed by Gyökeres inside the box, with the Brazilian smashing his attempt off the crossbar. Hincapié, playing against his parent club, followed suit through a shot straight at Leverkusen goalkeeper Janis Blaswich, who made a routine stop on the powerful effort. The home side took the lead shortly after the restart, as an unmarked Robert Andrich headed home from a corner, bypassing a napping Arsenal defence. The visitors ramped up the urgency following this setback, with Arteta sending Madueke and Havertz into the fray to change the momentum. Soon enough, these changes came to fruition as the England international drew a penalty in the 86th minute. Havertz dispatched the spot-kick, leveling the tie against his boyhood club heading into the second leg at the Emirates.

Arsenal returned to the Emirates to play 8th position Everton on 14 March. After a back-and-forth first hour which saw Everton winger Dwight McNeil denied by the post and an acrobatic block from Calafiori, Martinelli and Gyökeres were introduced to freshen things up in attack on 61 minutes. Dowman and Hincapié were brought on ten minutes later. In the 89th minute, the subs combined as Dowman supplied Hincapié a phenomenal cross, with the Ecuadorian defender chesting it down for Gyökeres to poke into an open goal. Deep into stoppage time, Dowman had his goal as the teenage sensation floored two defenders on a quick counter following a corner, carrying the ball sixty-five yards to finish into an empty net. This goal meant that at just 16 years and 73 days, the Hale End product had become the youngest goalscorer in Premier League history, eclipsing James Vaughan's record by over half a year. The 2–0 win massively boosted the home side's title bid, propelling them ten points above a faltering Manchester City, who would draw away at West Ham United the following day.

Arsenal hosted Bayer Leverkusen in the second leg of the Champions League round of 16 on 17 March. Heading into the leg tied on aggregate with the German outfit, Arteta deployed a strong starting XI with only Timber missing out from injury. Gabriel, Trossard, and Saka squandered key chances early on, but these rued opportunities would be canceled out through a stunning top-corner volley on the turn by Eze. However, Arsenal's number 10 would not be the only one to net a screamer in the match, as in the 74th minute, fellow countryman Rice controlled the ball nicely near the edge of the area before rolling an inch-perfect finish inside of the post. Late into the match, Raya added another stop to his growing catalogue of great saves, tipping away Christian Kofane's stretched effort on 87 minutes. Having completed a 3–1 aggregate defeat of Leverkusen, Arteta's men could now look forward to their third Champions League quarter-final in a row, where they would play Sporting CP.

On 22 March, Arsenal traveled to Wembley Stadium to take on Manchester City in the 2026 EFL Cup final. The match was Arsenal's first major cup final under Arteta since the 2020 FA Cup final, and a repeat of the 2018 EFL Cup final where City beat Arsene Wenger's Gunners 3–0. Timber and Eze were the only major absentees for Arsenal, who were both out injured. Arteta also opted to play Arizzabalaga in goal instead of the usual Raya. Arsenal started the match the brighter of the two sides, with Zubimendi sending Havertz through on goal in the sixth minute, only for the German to fire straight at City goalkeeper James Trafford. As the game continued, however, Pep Guardiola's side enjoyed the greater share of possession, pinning Arteta's men in their own half. Erling Haaland squandered a great chance on the cusp of halftime, heading over under great pressure from White and Hincapié. After the break, City began wave after wave of relentless attacks, with Antoine Semenyo and Rodri both firing wide. But just before the hour mark, the Sky Blue had their lead through Nico O'Reilly, who headed into an empty net after goalkeeper Arrizabalaga spilled a cross. The young left-back soon doubled the advantage, as he lost his marker, Saka, before receiving Matheus Nunes's cross and heading home again. Arteta's substitutions failed to spark a comeback, though Calafiori and Jesus both struck the woodwork late on. City's 2–0 triumph saw their name engraved onto the trophy for the ninth time, and a record fifth time for manager Pep Guardiola. It was Arsenal's first loss in seven meetings against the Manchester club since a 4–1 thrashing in April 2023. The defeat also ended hopes of an unprecedented quadruple for the Gunners, heading into the fourth and final international break of the campaign.

Thirteen Arsenal players (excluding loaned out players) were named in their respective countries' senior squads for international fixtures in March: Martinelli (Brazil), Nørgaard (Denmark), Hincapié (Ecuador), Madueke, Saka, Rice, and White (England), Havertz (Germany), Calafiori (Italy), Mosquera, Zubimendi, and Raya (Spain), and Gyökeres (Sweden).

=== April ===

Starting XI (4–3–3 formation) for Champions League away match against Atletico Madrid on 29 April

Arsenal began April with disappointment as their FA Cup journey came to an end following a 2–1 defeat away to Southampton in the quarter-finals on 4 April. Arteta rotated heavily following the international break, but the hosts capitalised on defensive lapses to progress to the semi-finals. After Gyökeres scored the equaliser in the second half, Southampton struck a late winner to eliminate Arsenal from the competition. Three days later, the Gunners travelled to Lisbon for the first leg of their Champions League quarter-final against Sporting CP. In a tense and cagey affair, Arsenal secured a crucial 1–0 victory thanks to a composed stoppage-time finish from Kai Havertz, assisted by Gabriel Martinelli.

Arsenal's momentum suffered another setback on 11 April as they fell to a shock 2–1 home defeat against Bournemouth. Despite Gyökeres scoring an equaliser from the penalty spot after an early setback, defensive mistakes and a lack of cutting edge allowed the visitors to restore their advantage in the second half, raising fresh questions in the Premier League title race. Arteta's side responded in Europe on 15 April, holding Sporting CP to a goalless draw at the Emirates Stadium to progress to the Champions League semi-finals with a 1–0 aggregate victory, securing consecutive semi-final appearances in the competition for the first time in the club's history.

The title race suffered another major blow four days later as Arsenal were defeated 2–1 away to Manchester City. Guardiola's side controlled much of the possession, with Rayan Cherki opening the scoring early on before Havertz capitalised on a pressing error by Donnarumma to equalise just two minutes later. However, Haaland restored City's lead in the second half, handing Arsenal a damaging defeat in the title race. City later defeated Burnley to move top of the table ahead of Arsenal on goal difference, with the two sides level on points.

Arsenal steadied themselves on 25 April with a hard-fought 1–0 victory over Newcastle United. An early strike from Eze proved decisive in a physical contest, while Arsenal's defence held firm to secure a valuable clean sheet in the closing stages. On 29 April, Arsenal travelled to Spain to face Atlético Madrid in the first leg of their Champions League semi-final. Gyökeres converted a penalty shortly before halftime to give Arsenal the lead, but Atlético responded in the second half through a Julián Álvarez penalty, as the match ended in a 1–1 draw at the Metropolitano Stadium.

=== May ===

Starting XI (4–2–3–1 formation) for Champions League Final against Paris Saint-Germain on 30 May

Arsenal opened May with a commanding 3–0 home victory over Fulham, a result that further strengthened their position at the top of the table, moving them six points clear. A brace from Gyökeres and one from Saka sealed a comfortable afternoon at the Emirates. Gyökeres' strikes also saw the Swedish forward reach over 20 goals in all competitions during his debut season, becoming the first Arsenal player to achieve the feat since Alexis Sánchez in 2014–15. Title challengers Manchester City, meanwhile, only managed a 3–3 draw away to Everton, scoring a last-minute stoppage-time equaliser through Jérémy Doku. The result further boosted Arsenal's title chances, widening the gap at a crucial stage of the season despite Manchester City still having a game in hand.

On 5 May, Arsenal hosted Atlético Madrid in the second leg of their Champions League semi-final tie. In a tense and tactical encounter, the breakthrough came through Saka, whose composed finish proved decisive in a 1–0 victory on the night. That result secured Arsenal's passage to their second Champions League final in 20 years, marking a significant milestone in Arteta's European project. The unbeaten run to the final saw Arsenal record 11 wins and three draws from their 14 matches in the competition. The club also conceded just six goals throughout their European campaign, while goalkeeper David Raya recorded his ninth clean sheet of the competition, equalling the Champions League record. The win over Atlético also confirmed a historic statistical milestone for the club. Arsenal reached 41 wins across the season, matching their best-ever total from 1970–71, while their defensive record stood out with 30 clean sheets, the club's best return since 1993–94.

On 10 May, Arsenal secured a 1–0 away victory over relegation-battling West Ham United, with Leandro Trossard scoring the only goal in the 83rd minute. The match featured late drama in stoppage time when Callum Wilson appeared to have equalised for West Ham, but the goal was disallowed after a VAR review ruled that Pablo had committed a foul on Arsenal goalkeeper David Raya during the build-up, preserving Arsenal's lead and securing the win. VAR decision, reviewed by referee Chris Kavanagh and advised by VAR official Darren England, was later described as one of the most pivotal VAR calls in Premier League history, with the incident drawing widespread debate among refereeing analysts and commentators.

On 18 May, Arsenal secured a 1–0 victory over Burnley, with Saka delivering a corner that was headed in by Havertz. The result marked Arsenal's 22nd different league match in which they scored from a set piece that season, as well as a joint-record sixth match in which they did not concede a single shot on target, matching their feat from the 2003–04 campaign. Raya also equaled the club record for most clean sheets in a single campaign with 19, matching David Seaman in the 1993–94 and 1998–99 seasons, while Saka became only the third Arsenal player after Thierry Henry and Dennis Bergkamp to register 50 goals and assists for the club. A day later, Arsenal secured their fourth Premier League title and their first since the 2003–04 season after second-place Manchester City were held to a 1–1 away draw by Bournemouth, leaving Arsenal four points clear with one match remaining. On the final day of the season, they secured a 2–1 away victory over Crystal Palace, after which captain Martin Ødegaard lifted the trophy for their 14th English league title. They also became the first team in Premier League history to complete a campaign without conceding a penalty or receiving a red card. Arsenal's triumph was built on defensive resilience and set-piece dominance throughout the campaign, finishing the season as the league's best defensive side while also scoring 18 goals from corners at a historic rate.

On 30 May, Arsenal contested their second UEFA Champions League final against defending champions Paris Saint-Germain. The Gunners took an early lead through Kai Havertz and maintained their advantage for the first half. However, their lead was cancelled out in the second half when Cristhian Mosquera conceded a penalty after fouling Khvicha Kvaratskhelia, allowing Ousmane Dembélé to equalise from the spot. With neither side able to find a winner, the match was decided by a penalty shootout, where Paris Saint-Germain prevailed 4–3, extending Arsenal's wait for a first European Cup title and leaving them as the competition's most-played club never to win it (226 matches).

== First team ==
=== First team coaching staff ===
Note: Age as of 30 June 2026.

Position	Name	Nationality	Date of birth (age)	Appointed on	Last club/team	Ref.
Manager	Mikel Arteta	Spain	26 Mar 1982 (age 44)	20 Dec 2019	(England) Manchester City (as assistant coach)	
Assistant manager	Albert Stuivenberg	Netherlands	5 Aug 1970 (age 55)	24 Dec 2019	Wales (as assistant manager)	
Assistant manager	Miguel Molina	Spain	3 Jan 1993 (age 33)	28 Aug 2020	(Spain) Atlético Madrid	
First team coach	Gabriel Heinze	Argentina	19 Apr 1978 (age 48)	8 Jul 2025	(Argentina) Newell's Old Boys (as head coach)	
Set-piece coach	Nicolas Jover	France	28 Oct 1981 (age 44)	5 Jul 2021	(England) Manchester City (as set-piece coach)	
Goalkeeping coach	Iñaki Caña	Spain	19 Sep 1975 (age 50)	24 Dec 2019	(England) Brentford	

=== First team squad ===
Notes:

- Squad numbers last updated on 1 September 2025. Age and contract details as of 30 June 2026.
- Flags indicate national team as defined under FIFA eligibility rules. Players may change their FIFA nationalities after the 2025–26 season, and may hold more than one non-FIFA nationality.
- Player^{*} – Player who joined Arsenal permanently or on loan during the season.
- Player^{†} – Player who departed Arsenal permanently or on loan during the season.
- Player (HG) – Player who fulfils the Premier League's "Home Grown Player" criteria.
- Player (CT) – Player who fulfils UEFA's "club-trained player" criteria.
- Player (AT) – Player who fulfils UEFA's "association-trained player" criteria.

No.	Player	Nat.	Position(s) (Footed)	Date of birth (age)	Height	Date signed	Signed from	Transfer fee	Contract ends	Ref.
Goalkeepers
1	David Raya (HG, AT) (Note: Raya graduated from Blackburn Rovers' academy.)	ESP	GK (R)	15 Sep 1995 (age 30)	1.83 m (6 ft 0 in)	15 Aug 2023 (loan); 4 Jul 2024	(England) Brentford	£3.0m (loan) £27.0m	2028	
13	Kepa Arrizabalaga^{*}	ESP	GK (R)	3 Oct 1994 (age 31)	1.89 m (6 ft 2 in)	1 Jul 2025	(England) Chelsea	£5.0m	2028	
35	Tommy Setford	ENG	GK (R)	13 Mar 2006 (age 20)	1.85 m (6 ft 1 in)	21 Jul 2024	(Netherlands) Ajax	£0.8m	2028	
Defenders
2	William Saliba (HG, CT)	FRA	CB (R)	24 Mar 2001 (age 25)	1.92 m (6 ft 4 in)	25 Jul 2019	(France) Saint-Étienne	£27.0m	2030	
3	Cristhian Mosquera^{*}	ESP	CB / RB (R)	27 Jun 2004 (age 22)	1.88 m (6 ft 2 in)	24 Jul 2025	(Spain) Valencia	£13.0m (initial fee)	2030+1	
4	Ben White (HG, AT) (Note: White graduated from Brighton & Hove Albion's academy.)	ENG	RB / CB (R)	8 Oct 1997 (age 28)	1.86 m (6 ft 1 in)	30 Jul 2021	(England) Brighton & Hove Albion	£50.0m	2028	
5	Piero Hincapié^{*}	ECU	CB / LB (L)	9 Jan 2002 (age 24)	1.84 m (6 ft 0 in)	1 Sep 2025	(Germany) Bayer Leverkusen	Undisclosed (loan fee)	2026 (end of loan)	
6	Gabriel Magalhães	BRA	CB (L)	19 Dec 1997 (age 28)	1.90 m (6 ft 3 in)	1 Sep 2020	(France) Lille	£23.1m	2029	
12	Jurriën Timber	NED	RB / LB / CB (R)	17 Jun 2001 (age 25)	1.79 m (5 ft 10 in)	14 Jul 2023	(Netherlands) Ajax	£34.3m (initial fee)	2028	
33	Riccardo Calafiori	ITA	LB / CB / RB (L)	19 May 2002 (age 24)	1.88 m (6 ft 2 in)	29 Jul 2024	(Italy) Bologna	£33.6m (initial fee)	2029	
49	Myles Lewis-Skelly (HG, CT)	ENG	LB / DM (L)	26 Sep 2006 (age 19)	1.78 m (5 ft 10 in)	5 Oct 2023	(England) Arsenal Academy		2030	
Midfielders
8	Martin Ødegaard (Captain)	NOR	AM / CM (L)	17 Dec 1998 (age 27)	1.78 m (5 ft 10 in)	27 Jan 2021 (loan); 20 Aug 2021	(Spain) Real Madrid	£1.8m (loan) £30.0m	2028	
10	Eberechi Eze^{*} (HG, AT) (Note: Eze graduated from Millwall academy.)	ENG	AM / LW (R)	29 Jun 1998 (age 28)	1.78 m (5 ft 10 in)	23 Aug 2025	(England) Crystal Palace	£60.0m (initial fee)	2029+1	
16	Christian Nørgaard^{*}	DEN	DM / CM (R)	10 Mar 1994 (age 32)	1.87 m (6 ft 1 in)	10 Jul 2025	(England) Brentford	£10.0m (initial fee)	2027+1	
23	Mikel Merino	ESP	CM / AM / ST (L)	22 Jun 1996 (age 30)	1.89 m (6 ft 2 in)	27 Aug 2024	(Spain) Real Sociedad	£27.4m (initial fee)	2028+1	
36	Martín Zubimendi^{*}	ESP	DM / CM (R)	2 Feb 1999 (age 27)	1.81 m (5 ft 11 in)	6 Jul 2025	(Spain) Real Sociedad	£55.8m	2030	
41	Declan Rice (HG, AT) (Note: Rice graduated from West Ham United's academy.)	ENG	CM / DM / CB (R)	14 Jan 1999 (age 27)	1.88 m (6 ft 2 in)	15 Jul 2023	(England) West Ham United	£100.0m (initial fee)	2028+1	
Forwards
7	Bukayo Saka (Vice-captain) (HG, CT)	ENG	RW / LB (L)	5 Sep 2001 (age 24)	1.78 m (5 ft 10 in)	14 Sep 2018	(England) Arsenal Academy		2030	
9	Gabriel Jesus	BRA	ST / LW / RW (R)	3 Apr 1997 (age 29)	1.75 m (5 ft 9 in)	4 Jul 2022	(England) Manchester City	£45.0m	2027	
11	Gabriel Martinelli (HG, CT)	BRA	LW / ST / RW (R)	18 Jun 2001 (age 25)	1.78 m (5 ft 10 in)	2 Jul 2019	(Brazil) Ituano	£6.0m	2027+1	
14	Viktor Gyökeres^{*}	SWE	ST (R)	4 Jun 1998 (age 28)	1.87 m (6 ft 1 in)	26 Jul 2025	(Portugal) Sporting CP	£55.0m (initial fee)	2030	
19	Leandro Trossard	BEL	LW / ST / AM (R)	4 Dec 1994 (age 31)	1.72 m (5 ft 8 in)	20 Jan 2023	(England) Brighton & Hove Albion	£21.0m (initial fee)	2027+1	
20	Noni Madueke^{*} (HG, AT) (Note: Madueke graduated from Tottenham Hotspur's academy.)	ENG	RW / LW (L)	10 Mar 2002 (age 24)	1.82 m (6 ft 0 in)	18 Jul 2025	(England) Chelsea	£48.5m (initial fee)	2030	
29	Kai Havertz	GER	ST / AM (L)	11 Jun 1999 (age 27)	1.93 m (6 ft 4 in)	28 Jun 2023	(England) Chelsea	£62.0m (initial fee)	2028	
Out on loan
15	Jakub Kiwior	POL	CB / LB (L)	15 Feb 2000 (age 26)	1.89 m (6 ft 2 in)	23 Jan 2023	(Italy) Spezia	£17.6m	2027+1	
21	Fábio Vieira	POR	AM / RW (L)	30 May 2000 (age 26)	1.70 m (5 ft 7 in)	21 Jun 2022	(Portugal) Porto	£29.9m (initial fee)	2027	
22	Ethan Nwaneri^{†} (HG, CT)	ENG	AM / RW (L)	21 Mar 2007 (age 19)	1.76 m (5 ft 9 in)	28 Mar 2024	(England) Arsenal Academy		2030	
24	Reiss Nelson (HG, CT)	ENG	LW / RW (R)	10 Dec 1999 (age 26)	1.75 m (5 ft 9 in)	23 Dec 2016	(England) Arsenal Academy		2027+1	
31	Karl Hein (HG, CT)	EST	GK (R)	13 Apr 2002 (age 24)	1.93 m (6 ft 4 in)	9 May 2019	(England) Arsenal Academy		2026+1	

==== Squad number changes ====
Note: Squad numbers last updated on 23 August 2025.

No.	Current player	Previous player	Notes	Ref.
1	(Spain) David Raya (previously no. 22)	(England) Aaron Ramsdale	Ramsdale departed the club (August 2024).	
3	(Spain) Cristhian Mosquera (new signing)	(Scotland) Kieran Tierney	Tierney departed the club (June 2025).	
5	(Ecuador) Piero Hincapié (new signing)	(Ghana) Thomas Partey	Partey departed the club (June 2025).	
10	(England) Eberechi Eze (new signing)	(England) Emile Smith Rowe	Smith Rowe departed the club (August 2024).	
13	(Spain) Kepa Arrizabalaga (new signing)	(Iceland) Rúnar Alex Rúnarsson	Runarsson departed the club (February 2024).	
14	(Sweden) Viktor Gyökeres (new signing)	(England) Eddie Nketiah	Nketiah departed the club (August 2024).	
16	(Denmark) Christian Nørgaard (new signing)	(England) Rob Holding	Holding departed the club (September 2023).	
20	(England) Noni Madueke (new signing)	(Italy) Jorginho	Jorginho departed the club (June 2025).	
22	(England) Ethan Nwaneri (previously no. 53)	(Spain) David Raya	Raya took the number 1 shirt (July 2025).	
35	(England) Tommy Setford (previously no.36)	(Ukraine) Oleksandr Zinchenko	Zinchenko took the number 17 shirt (August 2024).	
36	(Spain) Martín Zubimendi (new signing)	(England) Tommy Setford	Setford was re-allocated to the number 35 shirt (July 2025).	

== Academy ==
=== Academy coaching staff ===
On 4 July 2025, Under-21s Head Coach Mehmet Ali departed the club to take up an Assistant coaching role at Brentford. Whilst it was initially on an interim basis, Max Porter subsequently replaced Ali on a permanent basis on 15 August 2025. Ken Gillard became his assistant coach.

Position	Name	Nationality	Year joined	Last club/team	Ref.
Academy Manager	Per Mertesacker	Germany	2018	(England) Arsenal (as player)	
Head of Academy Coaching	Luke Hobbs	England	2013	(England) Southend United	
Under-21s Head Coach	Max Porter	England	2019	(England) Chelmsford City (as player)	
Under-21s Assistant Coach	Ken Gillard	Ireland	2016	(England) Crystal Palace	
Under-18s Head Coach	Adam Birchall	Wales	2016	(England) Bromley (as player)	

== Board and management team ==
On 19 September, the club announced a number of changes at board level, which included the departure of Executive Vice-chair Tim Lewis and the promotion of Richard Garlick from managing director to chief executive officer. Members of Kroenke Sports & Entertainment (KSE), Kelly Blaha and Otto Maly, long-term KSE advisor, Dave Steiner, and film producer and director, Ben Winston, a season ticket holder at Arsenal for over 30 years, all joined the board as non-executive directors. The departure of Lewis, who has advised the KSE group since 2007 (including around the incremental purchase of Arsenal Football Club) and held a position at Arsenal since 2020 (thus steering the club through the financial peril of the COVID-19 pandemic), was seen as a shock move.

Arsenal Board
Position	Name	Ref.
Co-chairman	(United States) Stan Kroenke	
Co-chairman	(United States) Josh Kroenke	
Director	(England) Lord Harris of Peckham	
Non-Executive Director	(United States) Kelly Blaha	
Non-Executive Director	(United States) Otto Maly	
Non-Executive Director	(United States) Dave Steiner	
Non-Executive Director	(England) Ben Winston	

Management team
Position	Name	Ref.
Chief Executive Officer	(England) Richard Garlick	
Sporting Director	(Italy) Andrea Berta	
Director of Football Operations	(England) James King	
Head of Sports Medicine	(England) Zafar Iqbal	

== Contracts and transfers ==
=== New contracts ===
The following Arsenal players signed their first or new professional contracts with the club.

Date	No.	Pos.	Player	Contract type	Ref.
First team
6 Jun 2025	6	DF	(Brazil) Gabriel Magalhães	Contract extension until 2029	
26 Jun 2025	49	DF	(England) Myles Lewis-Skelly	Contract extension until 2030	
8 Aug 2025	22	MF	(England) Ethan Nwaneri	Contract extension until 2030	
30 Sep 2025	2	DF	(France) William Saliba	Contract extension until 2030	
19 Feb 2026	7	FW	(England) Bukayo Saka	Contract extension until 2030	
Academy
11 Jul 2025	54	DF	(England) William Sweet	First professional contract	
12 Jul 2025	55	DF	(England) Marcell Washington	First professional contract	
13 Jul 2025	38	MF	(England) Louie Copley	First professional contract	
14 Jul 2025	42	DF	(Egypt) Cam'ron Ismail	First professional contract	
14 Jul 2025	50	FW	(England) Daniel Oyetunde	First professional contract	
18 Jul 2025	80	FW	(England) Louis Zecevic-John	First professional contract	
18 Jul 2025	79	GK	(England) Khari Ranson	First professional contract	
8 Aug 2025	71	FW	(England) Andre Harriman-Annous	First professional contract	
16 Aug 2025	43	FW	(Netherlands) Ismeal Kabia	Contract extension (length undisclosed)	
29 Aug 2025	78	GK	(England) Jack Porter	First professional contract	
16 Oct 2025	81	FW	(England) Brando Bailey-Joseph	First professional contract	
27 Jan 2026	72	MF	(England) Ife Ibrahim	First professional contract	
27 Jan 2026	85	DF	(England) Josiah King	First professional contract	
24 Feb 2026	84	MF	(England) Maalik Hashi	First professional contract	
24 Feb 2026	86	MF	(England) Teshaun Murisa	First professional contract	

=== Released ===
The following players from Arsenal's first team, under-21s and under-18s squads were released by the club.

Note: Excludes players who joined Arsenal on loan in the previous season and returned to their parent clubs this season.

Date	No.	Pos.	Player	Subsequent club	Join date	Notes	Ref.
First team
6 Jun 2025	20	MF	(Italy) Jorginho	(Brazil) Flamengo (Série A)	6 Jun 2025	Contract termination	
30 Jun 2025	3	DF	(Scotland) Kieran Tierney	(Scotland) Celtic (Premiership)	1 Jul 2025	End of contract	
30 Jun 2025 (Note: The contracts of Partey and Rosiak expired on 30 June 2025 and their departures were officially confirmed on 11 July 2025.)	5	MF	(Ghana) Thomas Partey	(Spain) Villarreal (La Liga)	7 Aug 2025	End of contract	
4 Jul 2025	18	DF	(Japan) Takehiro Tomiyasu	(Netherlands) Ajax (Eredivisie)	16 Dec 2025	Contract termination	
Academy
30 Jun 2025	37	FW	(England) Nathan Butler-Oyedeji	(Switzerland) Lausanne-Sport (Super League)	2 Jul 2025	End of contract	
30 Jun 2025	40	FW	(England) Khayon Edwards	(Portugal) Estoril Praia (Primeira Liga)	4 Jul 2025	End of contract	
30 Jun 2025	43	FW	(England) Romari Forde	(England) Kettering Town (Southern League)	12 Oct 2025	End of contract	
30 Jun 2025	44	MF	(England) Jimi Gower	(Portugal) Moreirense (Primeira Liga)	5 Aug 2025	End of contract	
30 Jun 2025	45	MF	(Republic of Ireland) Jack Henry-Francis	(Republic of Ireland) Shelbourne (Premier Division)	18 Jul 2025	End of contract	
30 Jun 2025	55	GK	(England) Brian Okonkwo	(England) West Bromwich Albion (Premier League 2)	18 Sep 2025	End of contract	
30 Jun 2025	56	MF	(Netherlands) Salah-Eddine Oulad M'Hand	(Latvia) Riga FC (Virslīga)	29 Jan 2026	End of contract	
30 Jun 2025	57	MF	(Morocco) Ismail Oulad M'Hand	(Bosnia and Herzegovina) Željezničar Sarajevo (Premier League)	23 Oct 2025	End of contract	
30 Jun 2025	59	DF	(Costa Rica) Elián Quesada-Thorn	(Costa Rica) Liga Deportiva Alajuelense (Liga Promérica)	19 Jul 2025	End of contract	
30 Jun 2025	63	MF	(Poland) Michał Rosiak	(Poland) Śląsk Wrocław (I liga)	3 Sep 2025	End of contract	
30 Jun 2025	71	FW	(England) Jakai Fisher	(England) Haringey Borough (Spartan South Midlands Premier Division)	16 Jan 2026	End of contract	
30 Jun 2025	73	FW	(England) Reece Clairmont	(England) Stanway Rovers (Isthmian North Division)	Oct 2025	End of contract	
30 Jun 2025	78	DF	(Poland) Max Kuczynski	(England) Charlton Athletic (Professional Development League)	6 Aug 2025	End of contract	
30 Jun 2025	80	MF	(England) Zacariah Shuaib	(Spain) Real Sociedad (La Liga)	15 Jul 2025	End of contract	

=== Transfers in ===
The following players joined Arsenal permanently and signed professional contracts with the club.

Date	No.	Pos.	Player	Transferred from	Transfer fee	Contract ends	Ref.
First team
1 Jul 2025	13	GK	(Spain) Kepa Arrizabalaga	(England) Chelsea (Premier League)	£5.0m	2028	
6 Jul 2025	36	MF	(Spain) Martín Zubimendi	(Spain) Real Sociedad (La Liga)	£55.8m	2030	
10 Jul 2025	16	MF	(Denmark) Christian Nørgaard	(England) Brentford (Premier League)	£10.0m + £2.0m	2027+1	
18 Jul 2025	20	FW	(England) Noni Madueke	(England) Chelsea (Premier League)	£48.5m + £3.5m	2030	
24 Jul 2025	3	DF	(Spain) Cristhian Mosquera	(Spain) Valencia (La Liga)	£13.0m + £3.5m	2030+1	
26 Jul 2025	14	FW	(Sweden) Viktor Gyökeres	(Portugal) Sporting CP (Primeira Liga)	£55.0m + £8.7m	2030	
23 Aug 2025	10	MF	(England) Eberechi Eze	(England) Crystal Palace (Premier League)	£60.0m + £7.5m	2029+1	
Academy
16 Jul 2025	83	DF	(Scotland) Callan Hamill	(Scotland) St Johnstone (Championship)	Undisclosed	2027 (scholarship)	
19 Jul 2025	58	MF	(Netherlands) Demiane Agustien	(England) Derby County (Premier League 2)	Undisclosed	Undisclosed	
30 Jul 2025	94	GK	(Poland) Remi Lupinski	(England) Milton Keynes Dons (Youth Alliance)	Undisclosed	2027 (scholarship)	
15 Sep 2025	57	FW	(England) Archie Stevens	(Scotland) Rangers B (Challenge Cup)	Undisclosed	Undisclosed	
3 Oct 2025 (Note: Whilst Ozhianvuna's transfer was confirmed this season, he will join the club permanently in January 2027.)	—	MF	(Republic of Ireland) Victor Ozhianvuna	(Republic of Ireland) Shamrock Rovers (Premier Division)	£1.7m + add ons	Undisclosed	
4 Dec 2025 (Note: Whilst their transfers were confirmed this season, Edwin and Holger Quintero will join the club permanently in August 2027.)	—	FW	(Ecuador) Edwin Quintero	(Ecuador) Independiente del Valle (Serie A)	£9.0m	Undisclosed	
4 Dec 2025	—	MF	(Ecuador) Holger Quintero	(Ecuador) Independiente del Valle (Serie A)	£9.0m	Undisclosed	
2 Feb 2026	52	DF	(England) Jaden Dixon	(England) Stoke City (Championship)	£0.5m	Undisclosed	
2 Feb 2026	66	FW	(Scotland) Evan Mooney	(Scotland) St Mirren (Premiership)	£0.4m + £0.4m	Undisclosed	
7 Feb 2026 (Note: Whilst McCarron's transfer was confirmed this season, he will join the club permanently in July 2026)	—	DF	(Northern Ireland) Daniel McCarron	(Northern Ireland) Dungannon Swifts (Premiership)	Undisclosed	Undisclosed	

Total expenditure: ▼£248.2 million (excluding potential add-ons, bonuses, undisclosed figures and future transfers)

=== Transfers out ===
The following players departed Arsenal permanently and signed professional contracts with another club.

Date	No.	Pos.	Player	Transferred to	Transfer fee	Ref.
5 Jun 2025	—	DF	(Portugal) Nuno Tavares	(Italy) Lazio (Serie A)	£7.6m (Note: Arsenal retain a 25% sell-on clause for any future transfer Tavares makes.)	
9 Jun 2025	27	FW	(Brazil) Marquinhos	(Brazil) Cruzeiro (Série A)	£3.0m (Note: Arsenal retain an undisclosed sell-on clause for any future transfer Marquinhos makes.)	
1 Sep 2025	28	MF	(Belgium) Albert Sambi Lokonga	(Germany) Hamburger SV (Bundesliga)	£2.6m	
1 Feb 2026	17	DF	(Ukraine) Oleksandr Zinchenko	(Netherlands) Ajax (Eredivisie)	£1.3m	
Academy
31 Jan 2026	44	DF	(Albania) Maldini Kacurri	(England) Grimsby Town (League Two)	Undisclosed	
2 Feb 2026	45	FW	(Sierra Leone) Osman Kamara	(England) Blackburn Rovers (Championship)	Undisclosed	
20 Feb 2026	50	FW	(England) Daniel Oyetunde	(United States) Fort Wayne (USL League One)	Undisclosed	

Total income: ▲£14.5 million (excluding potential add-ons, bonuses and undisclosed figures)

=== Loans in ===
The following players joined Arsenal on loan and signed professional contracts with the club.

Date	No.	Pos.	Player	Loaned from	On loan until	Loan fee	Ref.
1 Sep 2025	5	DF	(Ecuador) Piero Hincapié	(Germany) Bayer Leverkusen (Bundesliga)	End of season	Undisclosed (Note: Arsenal retain the option to make the move permanent for £45.0m at the end of the loan.)	

Total expenditure: ▼£0.0 million (excluding purchase options and additional fees)

=== Loans out ===
The following players departed Arsenal on loan and signed professional contracts with another club.

- Date^{‡} – Loan was originally scheduled to last to until end of the season but was curtailed.

Date	No.	Pos.	Player	Loaned to	On loan until	Loan fee	Ref.
First team
22 Aug 2025	31	GK	(Estonia) Karl Hein	(Germany) Werder Bremen (Bundesliga)	End of season	Undisclosed	
1 Sep 2025	15	DF	(Poland) Jakub Kiwior	(Portugal) Porto (Primeira Liga)	End of season	£1.7m (Note: Porto retain an obligation to make the loan permanent for £14.7m with an additional £4.3m in add-ons. Arsenal will also receive £1.7m from any future transfer Kiwior makes.)	
1 Sep 2025	17	DF	(Ukraine) Oleksandr Zinchenko	(England) Nottingham Forest (Premier League)	1 February 2026^{‡} (Note: On 1 February, Zinchenko was recalled early from his season-long loan at Nottingham Forest and subsequently signed permanently for Ajax.)	Undisclosed	
1 Sep 2025	21	MF	(Portugal) Fábio Vieira	(Germany) Hamburger SV (Bundesliga)	End of season	Undisclosed (Note: Hamburger SV retain an option to make the loan permanent for £17.3m.)	
1 Sep 2025	24	FW	(England) Reiss Nelson	(England) Brentford (Premier League)	End of season	Undisclosed (Note: Brentford retain an option to make the loan permanent for an undisclosed figure.)	
23 Jan 2026	22	MF	(England) Ethan Nwaneri	(France) Marseille (Ligue 1)	End of season	£1.3m (Note: Fee could rise to £3.5m based on penalty clauses regarding minutes played.)	
Academy
29 Aug 2025	43	FW	(Netherlands) Ismeal Kabia	(England) Shrewsbury Town (League Two)	End of season	Undisclosed	
1 Sep 2025	54	GK	(Denmark) Lucas Nygaard	(Denmark) Brabrand (2nd Division)	End of season	Undisclosed	
17 Sep 2025	44	DF	(Albania) Maldini Kacurri	(England) Morecambe (National League)	1 Jan 2026	Undisclosed	
31 Oct 2025	50	FW	(England) Daniel Oyetunde	(England) St Albans City (Isthmian Premier Division)	30 Nov 2025	Undisclosed	
29 Nov 2025	77	DF	(Egypt) Cam'ron Ismail	(England) Uxbridge (Southern Premier Division South)	31 Dec 2025	Undisclosed	
21 Dec 2025	39	MF	(England) Harrison Dudziak	(England) Braintree Town (National League)	21 Jan 2026	Undisclosed	
9 Jan 2026	38	MF	(England) Louie Copley	(England) Crawley Town (League Two)	End of season	Undisclosed	
31 Jan 2026	54	DF	(Wales) William Sweet	(England) Dagenham & Redbridge (National League)	End of season (Note: On 28 February, Sweet's loan at Dagenham & Redbridge was extended until the end of the season)	Undisclosed	
10 Feb 2026	53	FW	(England) Charles Sagoe Jr	(Sweden) Kalmar FF (Allsvenskan)	1 Jan 2027	Undisclosed	

Total income: ▲£3.0 million (excluding undisclosed figures)

=== Overall transfer activity ===
Note: All loan fees included. All potential add-ons, bonuses, undisclosed figures and future transfers excluded.

Transfer window	Spending	Income	Net expenditure
Summer 2025	▼£247.3 million	▲£14.9 million	▼£232.4 million
Winter 2026	▼£0.9 million	▲£2.6 million	▲£1.7 million
Total	▼£248.2 million	▲£17.5 million	▼£230.7 million

== Kits ==
Supplier: Adidas / Sponsor: Emirates / Sleeve sponsor: Visit Rwanda

Kits using Adidas's Three Stripes trademark
Home	Home alt. 1	Away	Away alt. 1	Away alt. 2	Away alt. 3	Goalkeeper^{1}	Goalkeeper^{2}	Goalkeeper^{4}

Kits using Adidas's Trefoil trademark
Third	Third alt. 1	Goalkeeper^{3}	Goalkeeper^{5}	Goalkeeper^{6}

=== Kit information ===
This is Adidas's seventh year supplying Arsenal kit, having taken over from Puma at the beginning of the 2019–20 season.

- Home: The club revealed their new home kit for the 2025–26 season on 15 May 2025. The kit uses Arsenal's traditional colours of red and white. The shirt has a red body and white sleeves and is complemented by white shorts and red socks. Red shorts may be used in some away games when there will be a colour clash with the home team's kit. Taken from the "Victoria Concordia Crescit" club crest, first used in the 1949–50 season, the gothic "A" of "Arsenal" is repeated across the body of the shirt. The kit was launched alongside a film named The pulse of our club.
- Away: On 21 July, the Gunners released their new away kit, which is a tribute to the ability of the club's supporters to energise the players in to feeling "100ft tall", stand out and own the moment. The shirt has a dark navy base with a lighter-navy lightning bolt pattern, a signature away-kit design that was inspired by the Royal Arsenal Gatehouse lightning bolt. The kit is complemented by navy shorts and socks, whereby metallic grey shorts will be used in the away games in which there are a colour clash with the home team's kit. The kit was launched with an accompanying video named Ready for new heights.
- Third: On 4 August, the club released their new third kit, which is inspired by the 20th anniversary of Arsenal's final season at the "iconic" Highbury Stadium. The shirt has a white base with off-white details that echo the stadium's distinctive art deco architecture. It also features a polo collar with dark red and gold stripes. The kit is complemented by dark red shorts and white socks, whereby white shorts will be used in the away games in which there are a colour clash with the home team's kit. The kit was launched with an accompanying video named A tribute to elegance, art and style.
- Goalkeeper: The new goalkeeper kits are based on Adidas's goalkeeper template for the season.

== Pre-season and friendlies ==
On 31 March 2025, Arsenal announced that they would travel to Hong Kong for the first time since 2012 to partake in the first North London derby on international soil in the history of the fixture. The match took place in the recently opened Kai Tak Sports Park on 31 July. On 11 April, Arsenal announced that they would be travelling to Singapore for the first time since 2018 to play matches against Italian side AC Milan and fellow Premier League side Newcastle United. The matches took place on 23 and 27 July respectively at the National Stadium, and finalised the club's three-match Asian pre-season schedule. On 5 July 2025, Arsenal announced that the concluding fixtures of the pre-season schedule would feature an Emirates Cup game against Athletic Bilbao on 9 August 2025 and a friendly three days earlier against fellow Spanish side Villareal, both at the Emirates Stadium.

23 July 2025 SFOF	Arsenal	1–0 (5–6 p)	Milan	Kallang, Singapore
19:30 SGT (12:30 BST)	Saka 53'	Report		Stadium: National Stadium; Attendance: 22,813; Referee: Jansen Foo (Singapore)
	Penalties
	Ødegaard (penalty missed); Zubimendi (penalty scored); Merino (penalty scored); Nelson (penalty missed); Kiwior (penalty missed); Dowman (penalty scored); Trossard (penalty scored); Nichols (penalty scored); Salmon (penalty missed)		(penalty scored) Gabbia; (penalty missed) Colombo; (penalty scored) Chukwueze; (penalty missed) Liberali; (penalty missed) Okafor; (penalty scored) Bondo; (penalty scored) F. Terracciano; (penalty scored) Duțu; (penalty scored) Comotto

27 July 2025 SFOF	Arsenal	3–2	Newcastle United	Kallang, Singapore
19:30 SGT (12:30 BST)	Merino 33'; A. Murphy 35' (o.g.); Zubimendi (yellow card) 38'; Ødegaard 84' (pen.)	Report	Elanga 6'; Lascelles (yellow card) 45+1'; J. Murphy 58'	Stadium: National Stadium; Attendance: 38,720; Referee: Clarence Leow (Singapore)

31 July 2025 HKFF	Arsenal	0–1	Tottenham Hotspur	Kowloon, Hong Kong
19:30 HKT (12:30 BST)	Merino (yellow card) 90+3'	Report	Bentancur (yellow card) 36'; Sarr 45'; Johnson (yellow card) 90+3'	Stadium: Kai Tak Sports Park; Attendance: 49,975; Referee: Lau Fong Hei (Hong Kong)

6 August 2025 Friendly	Arsenal	2–3 (3–4 p)	Villarreal	Holloway
18:00 BST	Nørgaard 36'; Ødegaard 76' (pen.)	Report	Pépé 16'; Etta Eyong 33'; Gueye (yellow card) 55'; Danjuma 68'	Stadium: Emirates Stadium; Attendance: 60,355; Referee: Sam Barrott (England)
	Penalties
	Ødegaard (penalty scored); Rice (penalty scored); Merino (penalty missed); Zinchenko (penalty scored); Gabriel (penalty missed); Madueke (penalty missed)		(penalty scored) Moleiro; (penalty missed) Suárez; (penalty scored) Danjuma; (penalty scored) Comesaña; (penalty missed) Valou; (penalty scored) Cabanes

9 August 2025 Emirates Cup	Arsenal	3–0 (6–5 p)	Athletic Bilbao	Holloway
17:00 BST	Gyökeres 35'; Saka 37'; Lewis-Skelly (yellow card) 69'; Havertz 82'	Report	Berchiche (yellow card) 2'	Stadium: Emirates Stadium; Attendance: 60,000; Referee: Robert Jones (England)
	Penalties
	Merino (penalty scored); Havertz (penalty scored); Madueke (penalty scored); Nwaneri (penalty missed); Saka (penalty scored); Saliba (penalty scored); Zubimendi (penalty scored)		(penalty scored) Guruzeta; (penalty scored) Navarro; (penalty scored) Vesga; (penalty scored) Serrano; (penalty missed) Sannadi; (penalty scored) Lekue; (penalty missed) Boiro

== Competitions ==
=== Overall record ===
Competition	First match	Last match	Starting round	Final position	Record							
Competition	First match	Last match	Starting round	Final position	Pld	W	D	L	GF	GA	GD	Win %
Premier League	17 August 2025	24 May 2026	Matchday 1	Winners	38	26	7	5	71	27	+44	68.42
FA Cup	11 January 2026	4 April 2026	Third round	Quarter-finals	4	3	0	1	11	4	+7	75.00
EFL Cup	24 September 2025	22 March 2026	Third round	Runners-up	6	4	1	1	9	5	+4	66.67
UEFA Champions League	16 September 2025	30 May 2026	League phase	Runners-up	15	11	4	0	30	7	+23	73.33
Total					63	44	12	7	121	43	+78	69.84

Source: Soccerway

=== Premier League ===
==== League table ====
Pos	Team	Pld	W	D	L	GF	GA	GD	Pts	Qualification or relegation
1	Arsenal (C)	38	26	7	5	71	27	+44	85	Qualification for the Champions League league phase (Note: The Premier League gained an additional Champions League place as a result of England gaining one of the two European Performance Spots (EPS) awarded to the two associations with the highest UEFA coefficient points in 2025–26.)
2	Manchester City	38	23	9	6	77	35	+42	78	Qualification for the Champions League league phase
3	Manchester United	38	20	11	7	69	50	+19	71	Qualification for the Champions League league phase
4	Aston Villa	38	19	8	11	56	49	+7	65	Qualification for the Champions League league phase
5	Liverpool	38	17	9	12	63	53	+10	60	Qualification for the Champions League league phase

Source: Premier League
Rules for classification: 1) Points; 2) Goal difference; 3) Goals scored; 4) If the champions, relegated teams or qualified teams for UEFA competitions cannot be determined by rules 1 to 3, rules 4.1 to 4.3 are applied – 4.1) Points gained in head-to-head record between such teams; 4.2) Away goals scored in head-to-head record between such teams; 4.3) Play-offs
(C) Champions

==== Results summary ====
Overall								Home						Away					
Pld	W	D	L	GF	GA	GD	Pts	W	D	L	GF	GA	GD	W	D	L	GF	GA	GD
38	26	7	5	71	27	+44	85	15	2	2	41	11	+30	11	5	3	30	16	+14

Source: Premier League

==== Results by round ====
Round	1	2	3	4	5	6	7	8	9	10	11	12	13	14	15	16	17	18	19	20	21	22	23	24	25	26	31^{1}	27	28	29	30	32	33	34	35	36	37	38
Ground	A	H	A	H	H	A	H	A	H	A	A	H	A	H	A	H	A	H	H	A	H	A	H	A	H	A	A	A	H	A	H	H	A	H	H	A	H	A
Result	W	W	L	W	D	W	W	W	W	W	D	W	D	W	L	W	W	W	W	W	D	D	L	W	W	D	D	W	W	W	W	L	L	W	W	W	W	W
Position	6	1	3	2	2	2	1	1	1	1	1	1	1	1	1	1	1	1	1	1	1	1	1	1	1	1	1	1	1	1	1	1	1	1	1	1	1	1
Points	3	6	6	9	10	13	16	19	22	25	26	29	30	33	33	36	39	42	45	48	49	50	50	53	56	57	58	61	64	67	70	70	70	73	76	79	82	85

Source: Premier League
A = Away; H = Home; W = Win; D = Draw; L = Loss; P = Postponed
Notes:
- Positions show the situation at the end of the corresponding Game Weeks (GW), not the position at the conclusion of matches or game days.
- ^{1} Matchday 31 (v. Wolverhampton Wanderers) was moved forward due to Arsenal's participation in the EFL Cup final.

==== Matches ====
The league fixtures were announced on 18 June 2025.

17 August 2025 1	Manchester United	0–1	Arsenal	Trafford
16:30 BST	Dorgu (yellow card) 85'	Report	Calafiori 13', (yellow card) 42'; Raya (yellow card) 85'; Timber (yellow card) 90+1'; Lewis-Skelly (yellow card) 90+3'	Stadium: Old Trafford; Attendance: 73,475; Referee: Simon Hooper

23 August 2025 2	Arsenal	5–0	Leeds United	Holloway
17:30 BST	Timber 34', 56'; Saka 45+1'; Gyökeres 48', 90+5' (pen.)	Report	Bogle (yellow card) 9'; Gudmundsson (yellow card) 80'	Stadium: Emirates Stadium; Attendance: 60,110; Referee: Jarred Gillett

31 August 2025 3	Liverpool	1–0	Arsenal	Liverpool
16:30 BST	Gravenberch (yellow card) 29'; Szoboszlai 83'; Endo (yellow card) 90+8'	Report	Gyökeres (yellow card) 66'; Zubimendi (yellow card) 81'	Stadium: Anfield; Attendance: 60,455; Referee: Chris Kavanagh

13 September 2025 4	Arsenal	3–0	Nottingham Forest	Holloway
12:30 BST	Zubimendi 32', 79'; Gyökeres 46'; Calafiori (yellow card) 61'	Report	Williams (yellow card) 78'	Stadium: Emirates Stadium; Attendance: 60,167; Referee: Darren England

21 September 2025 5	Arsenal	1–1	Manchester City	Holloway
16:30 BST	Timber (yellow card) 46'; Martinelli 90+3'	Report	Haaland 9'; Silva (yellow card) 36'; Donnarumma (yellow card) 77'	Stadium: Emirates Stadium; Attendance: 60,161; Referee: Stuart Attwell

28 September 2025 6	Newcastle United	1–2	Arsenal	Newcastle upon Tyne
16:30 BST	Woltemade 34'; Joelinton (yellow card) 83'; Burn (yellow card) 88'	Report	Calafiori (yellow card) 56'; Merino 84'; Gabriel 90+6'	Stadium: St James' Park; Attendance: 52,199; Referee: Jarred Gillett

4 October 2025 7	Arsenal	2–0	West Ham United	Holloway
15:00 BST	Rice 38'; Saka 67' (pen.)	Report	Summerville (yellow card) 58'; Paquetá (yellow card) 69'	Stadium: Emirates Stadium; Attendance: 60,181; Referee: John Brooks

18 October 2025 8	Fulham	0–1	Arsenal	Fulham
17:30 BST		Report	Trossard 58'	Stadium: Craven Cottage; Attendance: 27,736; Referee: Anthony Taylor

26 October 2025 9	Arsenal	1–0	Crystal Palace	Holloway
14:00 GMT	Eze 39'	Report		Stadium: Emirates Stadium; Attendance: 60,103; Referee: Thomas Bramall

1 November 2025 10	Burnley	0–2	Arsenal	Burnley
15:00 GMT	Cullen (yellow card) 27'; Flemming (yellow card) 55'	Report	Gyökeres 14'; Rice 35'; Gabriel (yellow card) 90+5'	Stadium: Turf Moor; Attendance: 21,538; Referee: Chris Kavanagh

8 November 2025 11	Sunderland	2–2	Arsenal	Sunderland
17:30 GMT	Ballard 36'; Xhaka (yellow card) 45+1'; Mandava (yellow card) 72'; Brobbey 90+4'	Report	Zubimendi (yellow card) 36'; Saka 54'; Trossard 74'	Stadium: Stadium of Light; Attendance: 46,799; Referee: Craig Pawson

23 November 2025 12	Arsenal	4–1	Tottenham Hotspur	Holloway
16:30 GMT	Trossard 36'; Eze 41', 46', 76'; Rice (yellow card) 87'	Report	Bentancur (yellow card) 32'; Richarlison 55'; Romero (yellow card) 70'; Porro (yellow card) 87'	Stadium: Emirates Stadium; Attendance: 60,345; Referee: Michael Oliver

30 November 2025 13	Chelsea	1–1	Arsenal	Fulham
16:30 GMT	Cucurella (yellow card) 11'; Caicedo (red card) 38'; Chalobah 48'	Report	Zubimendi (yellow card) 5'; Mosquera (yellow card) 13'; Calafiori (yellow card) 27'; Hincapié (yellow card) 41'; Lewis-Skelly (yellow card) 54'; Merino 59'; Gyökeres (yellow card) 88'	Stadium: Stamford Bridge; Attendance: 39,820; Referee: Anthony Taylor

3 December 2025 14	Arsenal	2–0	Brentford	Holloway
19:30 GMT	Merino 11'; Saka 90+1'	Report	Yarmolyuk (yellow card) 65'	Stadium: Emirates Stadium; Attendance: 60,110; Referee: Tony Harrington

6 December 2025 15	Aston Villa	2–1	Arsenal	Birmingham
12:30 GMT	Cash 36'; Buendía 90+5'	Report	Trossard 52'; Calafiori (yellow card) 72'; Saka (yellow card) 74'	Stadium: Villa Park; Attendance: 42,888; Referee: Peter Bankes

13 December 2025 16	Arsenal	2–1	Wolverhampton Wanderers	Holloway
20:00 GMT	Johnstone 70' (o.g.); Mosquera 90+4' (o.g.)	Report	Hwang Hee-chan (yellow card) 60'; Doherty (yellow card) 65'; Arokodare 90'; Mosquera (yellow card) 90+6'; Agbadou (yellow card) 90+8'	Stadium: Emirates Stadium; Attendance: 60,242; Referee: Robert Jones

20 December 2025 17	Everton	0–1	Arsenal	Liverpool
20:00 GMT	Mykolenko (yellow card) 26'; Tarkowski (yellow card) 39'	Report	Gyökeres 27' (pen.), (yellow card) 56'; Martinelli (yellow card) 89'	Stadium: Hill Dickinson Stadium; Attendance: 52,513; Referee: Sam Barrott

27 December 2025 18	Arsenal	2–1	Brighton & Hove Albion	Holloway
15:00 GMT	Ødegaard 14'; Rutter 52' (o.g.); Lewis-Skelly (yellow card) 69'; Hincapié (yellow card) 90'	Report	Verbruggen (yellow card) 45+1'; Dunk (yellow card) 50'; Coppola (yellow card) 56'; Gómez 64'	Stadium: Emirates Stadium; Attendance: 60,209; Referee: John Brooks

30 December 2025 19	Arsenal	4–1	Aston Villa	Holloway
20:15 GMT	Merino (yellow card) 45+1'; Gabriel 48'; Zubimendi 52'; Trossard 69'; Gabriel Jesus 78', (yellow card) 79'	Report	Rogers (yellow card) 45+2'; Bogarde (yellow card) 81'; Watkins 90+4', (yellow card) 90+7'	Stadium: Emirates Stadium; Attendance: 60,279; Referee: Darren England

3 January 2026 20	Bournemouth	2–3	Arsenal	Bournemouth
17:30 GMT	Evanilson 10'; Semenyo (yellow card) 26'; Kroupi 76', (yellow card) 80'; Adli (yellow card) 90+1'	Report	Gabriel 16'; Rice 54', 71'; Zubimendi (yellow card) 70'	Stadium: Dean Court; Attendance: 11,240; Referee: Chris Kavanagh

8 January 2026 21	Arsenal	0–0	Liverpool	Holloway
20:00 GMT	Trossard (yellow card) 12'; Martinelli (yellow card) 90+3'	Report	Mac Allister (yellow card) 90'; Konaté (yellow card) 90+3'	Stadium: Emirates Stadium; Attendance: 60,258; Referee: Anthony Taylor

17 January 2026 22	Nottingham Forest	0–0	Arsenal	West Bridgford
17:30 GMT	Aina (yellow card) 90'	Report	Timber (yellow card) 37'	Stadium: City Ground; Attendance: 30,729; Referee: Michael Oliver

25 January 2026 23	Arsenal	2–3	Manchester United	Holloway
16:30 GMT	Martínez 29' (o.g.); Rice (yellow card) 64'; Merino 84'; Eze (yellow card) 90+1'	Report	Mbeumo 37'; Dorgu 50'; Cunha 87'	Stadium: Emirates Stadium; Attendance: 60,296; Referee: Craig Pawson

31 January 2026 24	Leeds United	0–4	Arsenal	Leeds
15:00 GMT	Gudmundsson (yellow card) 37'	Report	Zubimendi 27'; Madueke 38'; Timber (yellow card) 59'; Gyökeres 69'; Gabriel Jesus 86'	Stadium: Elland Road; Attendance: 36,858; Referee: Stuart Attwell

7 February 2026 25	Arsenal	3–0	Sunderland	Holloway
15:00 GMT	Saliba (yellow card) 26'; Zubimendi 42'; Gyökeres 66', 90+3'	Report	Diarra (yellow card) 39'; Brobbey (yellow card) 40'	Stadium: Emirates Stadium; Attendance: 60,312; Referee: Sam Barrott

12 February 2026 26	Brentford	1–1	Arsenal	Brentford
20:00 GMT	Janelt (yellow card) 4'; Jensen (yellow card) 53'; Lewis-Potter 71'; Ouattara (yellow card) 86'	Report	Gabriel (yellow card) 20'; Gyökeres (yellow card) 30'; Madueke 61'	Stadium: Brentford Community Stadium; Attendance: 17,224; Referee: John Brooks

18 February 2026 31	Wolverhampton Wanderers	2–2	Arsenal	Wolverhampton
20:00 GMT	S. Bueno (yellow card) 45+4'; H. Bueno 61'; Bellegarde (yellow card) 71'; Edozie 90+4'	Report	Saka 5'; Hincapié 56'; Jesus (yellow card) 90+9'	Stadium: Molineux Stadium; Attendance: 29,843; Referee: Paul Tierney
Note: Fixture was moved forward due to Arsenal's participation in the EFL Cup final.

22 February 2026 27	Tottenham Hotspur	1–4	Arsenal	Tottenham
16:30 GMT	Kolo Muani 34'; Gray (yellow card) 35'; Bissouma (yellow card) 86'	Report	Timber (yellow card) 27'; Eze 32', 61'; Gyökeres 47', 90+4'	Stadium: Tottenham Hotspur Stadium; Attendance: 61,439; Referee: Peter Bankes

1 March 2026 28	Arsenal	2–1	Chelsea	Holloway
16:30 GMT	Saliba 21'; Timber 66'; Gabriel (yellow card) 75'	Report	Hincapié 45+2' (o.g.); Palmer (yellow card) 59'; Hato (yellow card) 65'; Neto (yellow card) 67' (yellow-red card) 70'; Fernández (yellow card) 79'	Stadium: Emirates Stadium; Attendance: 60,296; Referee: Darren England

4 March 2026 29	Brighton & Hove Albion	0–1	Arsenal	Brighton and Hove
19:30 GMT	Gómez (yellow card) 52'; Boscagli (yellow card) 80'; Kadıoğlu (yellow card) 82'; Ayari (yellow card) 90+4'	Report	Saka 9'; Mosquera (yellow card) 11'	Stadium: Falmer Stadium; Attendance: 31,575; Referee: Chris Kavanagh

14 March 2026 30	Arsenal	2–0	Everton	Holloway
17:30 GMT	Gyökeres 89'; Dowman 90+7'	Report		Stadium: Emirates Stadium; Attendance: 60,176; Referee: Andrew Madley

11 April 2026 32	Arsenal	1–2	Bournemouth	Holloway
12:30 BST	Gyökeres 35' (pen.), (yellow card) 80'	Report	Kroupi 17', (yellow card) 79'; Scott 74'; Truffert (yellow card) 77'; Hill (yellow card) 90+6'	Stadium: Emirates Stadium; Attendance: 60,210; Referee: Michael Oliver

19 April 2026 33	Manchester City	2–1	Arsenal	Manchester
16:30 BST	Cherki 16'; Guéhi (yellow card) 60'; Haaland 65', (yellow card) 83'	Report	Havertz 18'; Mosquera (yellow card) 36'; Gabriel (yellow card) 83'	Stadium: City of Manchester Stadium; Attendance: 52,523; Referee: Anthony Taylor

25 April 2026 34	Arsenal	1–0	Newcastle United	Holloway
17:30 BST	Eze 9'; Martinelli (yellow card) 71'; Rice (yellow card) 86'	Report	Burn (yellow card) 57'; Pope (yellow card) 74'	Stadium: Emirates Stadium; Attendance: 60,204; Referee: Sam Barrott

2 May 2026 35	Arsenal	3–0	Fulham	Holloway
17:30 BST	Gyökeres 9', 45+4'; Saka 40'	Report	Lukić (yellow card) 23'	Stadium: Emirates Stadium; Attendance: 60,196; Referee: Jarred Gillett

10 May 2026 36	West Ham United	0–1	Arsenal	Stratford
16:30 BST	Castellanos (yellow card) 34'; Summerville (yellow card) 38'; Todibo (yellow card) 68'	Report	Saka (yellow card) 77'; Mosquera (yellow card) 79'; Trossard 83', (yellow card) 90+1'; Saliba (yellow card) 89'	Stadium: London Stadium; Attendance: 60,429; Referee: Chris Kavanagh

18 May 2026 37	Arsenal	1–0	Burnley	Holloway
20:00 BST	Havertz 37', (yellow card) 67'	Report	Mejbri (yellow card) 28'; Flemming (yellow card) 90+1'; Lucas Pires (yellow card) 90+4'	Stadium: Emirates Stadium; Attendance: 60,274; Referee: Paul Tierney

24 May 2026 38	Crystal Palace	1–2	Arsenal	Selhurst
16:00 BST	Mateta 89'	Report	Gabriel Jesus 42', (yellow card) 74'; Madueke 48'	Stadium: Selhurst Park; Attendance: 25,192; Referee: Farai Hallam

=== FA Cup ===
As a Premier League side, Arsenal entered the FA Cup in the third round, and were drawn away to Championship side Portsmouth. They were then drawn consecutive ties against League One opposition, hosting Wigan Athletic in the fourth round and travelling to Mansfield Town in the fifth round. The club were then drawn to travel to their second Championship south coast tie of the competition at Southampton in the quarter final.

11 January 2026 Third round	Portsmouth	1–4	Arsenal	Portsmouth
14:00 GMT	Bishop 3'; Le Roux (yellow card) 55'	Report	Dozzell 8' (o.g.); Martinelli 25', 51', 72'; Madueke (penalty missed) 43'; Lewis-Skelly (yellow card) 45'; White (yellow card) 68'	Stadium: Fratton Park; Attendance: 20,611; Referee: Tony Harrington

15 February 2026 Fourth round	Arsenal	4–0	Wigan Athletic	Holloway
16:30 GMT	Madueke 11'; Martinelli 18'; Hunt 23' (o.g.); Gabriel Jesus 27'; Lewis-Skelly (yellow card) 69'; Nørgaard (yellow card) 82'	Report	Moxon (yellow card) 73'; Aimson (yellow card) 83'	Stadium: Emirates Stadium; Attendance: 59,996; Referee: Tim Robinson

7 March 2026 Fifth round	Mansfield Town	1–2	Arsenal	Mansfield
12:15 GMT	Evans 50'; Reed (yellow card) 60'; Akins (yellow card) 77'; McLaughlin (yellow card) 80'; Lewis (yellow card) 90+2'	Report	Madueke 41'; Eze 66', (yellow card) 74'; Calafiori (yellow card) 70'	Stadium: Field Mill; Attendance: 9,260; Referee: Thomas Bramall

4 April 2026 Quarter-finals	Southampton	2–1	Arsenal	Southampton
20:00 BST	Manning (yellow card) 27'; Stewart 35'; Charles 85'; Jander (yellow card) 89'	Report	Gyökeres 68'; Martinelli (yellow card) 90+3'	Stadium: St Mary's Stadium; Attendance: 31,067; Referee: Sam Barrott

=== EFL Cup ===
The Gunners entered the EFL Cup in the third round as one of the Premier League teams participating in UEFA competitions. As a seeded team, they were drawn away to League One side Port Vale. They were then drawn consecutive home ties against Premier League opposition, with Brighton & Hove Albion in the fourth round and Crystal Palace in the quarter-finals. The semi-final draw then pitted Arsenal against another London rival in the form of Chelsea, with the second and decisive leg taking place at home. In the final, the club lost to Manchester City.

24 September 2025 Third round	Port Vale	0–2	Arsenal	Stoke-on-Trent
20:00 BST		Report	Eze 8'; Trossard 86'	Stadium: Vale Park; Attendance: 16,326; Referee: Andrew Kitchen

29 October 2025 Fourth round	Arsenal	2–0	Brighton & Hove Albion	Holloway
19:45 GMT	Nwaneri 57'; Saka 76'	Report	Coppola (yellow card) 34'; Boscagli (yellow card) 86'	Stadium: Emirates Stadium; Attendance: 59,292; Referee: Sam Barrott

23 December 2025 Quarter-finals	Arsenal	1–1 (8–7 p)	Crystal Palace	Holloway
20:00 GMT	Lacroix 80' (o.g.); Arrizabalaga (yellow card) 89'	Report	Guéhi 90+5'	Stadium: Emirates Stadium; Attendance: 59,497; Referee: Stuart Attwell
	Penalties
	Ødegaard (penalty scored); Rice (penalty scored); Saka (penalty scored); Trossard (penalty scored); Merino (penalty scored); Calafiori (penalty scored); Timber (penalty scored); Saliba (penalty scored)		(penalty scored) Mateta; (penalty scored) Devenny; (penalty scored) Hughes; (penalty scored) Sosa; (penalty scored) Lerma; (penalty scored) Wharton; (penalty scored) Uche; (penalty missed) Lacroix

14 January 2026 Semi-finals first leg	Chelsea	2–3	Arsenal	Fulham
20:00 GMT	Estêvão (yellow card) 42'; Cucurella (yellow card) 44'; Garnacho 57', 83'; Badiashile (yellow card) 65'; Neto (yellow card) 90'	Report	White 7'; Trossard (yellow card) 42'; Gyökeres 49'; Zubimendi 71'; Arrizabalaga (yellow card) 75'; Merino (yellow card) 78'; Timber (yellow card) 90+6'	Stadium: Stamford Bridge; Attendance: 39,243; Referee: Simon Hooper

3 February 2026 Semi-finals second leg	Arsenal	1–0 (4–2 agg.)	Chelsea	Holloway
20:00 GMT	Havertz 90+7'	Report	Delap (yellow card) 56'; Gusto (yellow card) 68'; Estêvão (yellow card) 71'	Stadium: Emirates Stadium; Attendance: 59,452; Referee: Peter Bankes

22 March 2026 Final	Arsenal	0–2	Manchester City	Wembley
16:30 GMT	Hincapié (yellow card) 16'; Arrizabalaga (yellow card) 50'; White (yellow card) 69'	Report	Khusanov (yellow card) 32'; O'Reilly 60', 64'	Stadium: Wembley Stadium; Attendance: 88,486; Referee: Peter Bankes

=== UEFA Champions League ===
==== League phase ====
Arsenal's UEFA club coefficient was 98.000 points at the end of the previous campaign. They were in Pot 2 for the league phase draw, which was held on 28 August 2025. Arsenal were randomly drawn to play Bayern Munich and Inter Milan (for the second consecutive season) from Pot 1, Atlético Madrid and Club Brugge from Pot 2, Olympiacos and Slavia Prague from Pot 3, and finally debutant Kairat and Athletic Bilbao from Pot 4.

===== League phase table =====
Pos	Team	Pld	W	D	L	GF	GA	GD	Pts	Qualification
1	(The Football Association) Arsenal	8	8	0	0	23	4	+19	24	Advance to round of 16 (seeded)
2	(German Football Association) Bayern Munich	8	7	0	1	22	8	+14	21	Advance to round of 16 (seeded)
3	(The Football Association) Liverpool	8	6	0	2	20	8	+12	18	Advance to round of 16 (seeded)
4	(The Football Association) Tottenham Hotspur	8	5	2	1	17	7	+10	17	Advance to round of 16 (seeded)
5	(Royal Spanish Football Federation) Barcelona	8	5	1	2	22	14	+8	16	Advance to round of 16 (seeded)

Source: UEFA
Rules for classification: League phase tiebreakers

===== Results summary =====
Overall								Home						Away					
Pld	W	D	L	GF	GA	GD	Pts	W	D	L	GF	GA	GD	W	D	L	GF	GA	GD
8	8	0	0	23	4	+19	24	4	0	0	12	3	+9	4	0	0	11	1	+10

Source: UEFA

===== Results by round =====
Round	1	2	3	4	5	6	7	8
Ground	A	H	H	A	H	A	A	H
Result	W	W	W	W	W	W	W	W
Position	7	5	4	2	1	1	1	1
Points	3	6	9	12	15	18	21	24

Source: UEFA
A = Away; H = Home; W = Win; D = Draw; L = Loss; P = Postponed

===== Matches =====
16 September 2025 1	Athletic Bilbao (Royal Spanish Football Federation)	0–2	(The Football Association) Arsenal	Bilbao, Spain
18:45 CEST (17:45 BST)	Jauregizar (yellow card) 85'	Report	Rice (yellow card) 7'; Martinelli 72'; Madueke (yellow card) 85'; Trossard 87'; Zubimendi (yellow card) 90+1'	Stadium: San Mamés; Attendance: 51,059; Referee: Donatas Rumšas (Lithuania)

1 October 2025 2	Arsenal (The Football Association)	2–0	(Hellenic Football Federation) Olympiacos	London, England
20:00 BST	Martinelli 12'; Gabriel (yellow card) 58'; Zubimendi (yellow card) 61'; Rice (yellow card) 78'; Saka 90+2'	Report	Strefezza (yellow card) 90'	Stadium: Emirates Stadium; Attendance: 56,820; Referee: François Letexier (France)

21 October 2025 3	Arsenal (The Football Association)	4–0	(Royal Spanish Football Federation) Atlético Madrid	London, England
20:00 BST	Zubimendi (yellow card) 38'; Gabriel 57'; Martinelli 64'; Gyökeres 67', 70'	Report	Giménez (yellow card) 33'; Le Normand (yellow card) 75'	Stadium: Emirates Stadium; Attendance: 59,200; Referee: Davide Massa (Italy)

4 November 2025 4	Slavia Prague (Football Association of the Czech Republic)	0–3	(The Football Association) Arsenal	Prague, Czech Republic
18:45 CET (17:45 GMT)	Zafiris (yellow card) 70'; Douděra (yellow card) 83'; Mbodji (yellow card) 90+6'	Report	Nwaneri (yellow card) 24'; Saka 32' (pen.); Merino (yellow card) 37', (goal) 46', 68'; Nørgaard (yellow card) 75'; Lewis-Skelly (yellow card) 79'	Stadium: Fortuna Arena; Attendance: 19,222; Referee: Aliyar Aghayev (Azerbaijan)

26 November 2025 5	Arsenal (The Football Association)	3–1	(German Football Association) Bayern Munich	London, England
20:00 GMT	Timber 22'; Madueke 69'; Saliba (yellow card) 74'; Martinelli 77'; Merino (yellow card) 80'	Report	Upamecano (yellow card) 23'; Karl 32'; Laimer (yellow card) 43'	Stadium: Emirates Stadium; Attendance: 58,780; Referee: Marco Guida (Italy)

10 December 2025 6	Club Brugge (Royal Belgian Football Association)	0–3	(The Football Association) Arsenal	Bruges, Belgium
21:00 CET (20:00 GMT)		Report	Madueke 25', 47'; Martinelli 56'; Nørgaard (yellow card) 65'; White (yellow card) 68'	Stadium: Jan Breydel Stadium; Attendance: 26,464; Referee: Sven Jablonski (Germany)

20 January 2026 7	Inter Milan (Italian Football Federation)	1–3	(The Football Association) Arsenal	Milan, Italy
21:00 CET (20:00 GMT)	Sučić 18'; Bastoni (yellow card) 72'; Acerbi (yellow card) 82'	Report	Gabriel Jesus 10', 31'; Merino (yellow card) 72'; Gyökeres 84'; Rice (yellow card) 90+2'	Stadium: San Siro; Attendance: 72,649; Referee: João Pinheiro (Portugal)

28 January 2026 8	Arsenal (The Football Association)	3–2	(Kazakhstan Football Federation) Kairat	London, England
20:00 GMT	Gyökeres 3'; Calafiori (yellow card) 6'; Havertz 15'; Martinelli 36'	Report	Jorginho 7' (pen.), (yellow card) 69'; Ricardinho 90+4'	Stadium: Emirates Stadium; Attendance: 50,200; Referee: Urs Schnyder (Switzerland)

==== Knockout phase ====
===== Round of 16 =====
As a result of finishing first in the league phase, Arsenal were seeded for the round of 16 draw, which took take place on 27 February 2026, and played the second leg at home. They were drawn against German side Bayer Leverkusen for the first time since 2002.

11 March 2026 First leg	Bayer Leverkusen (Germany)	1–1	(The Football Association) Arsenal	Leverkusen, Germany
18:45 CET (17:45 GMT)	Andrich (yellow card) 2', (goal) 46'; Poku (yellow card) 58'; Palacios (yellow card) 63'; Grimaldo (yellow card) 90+4'	Report	Martinelli (yellow card) 26'; Zubimendi (yellow card) 69'; Havertz 89' (pen.), (yellow card) 90+4'	Stadium: BayArena; Attendance: 30,210; Referee: Halil Umut Meler (Turkey)

17 March 2026 Second leg	Arsenal (The Football Association)	2–0 (3–1 agg.)	(Germany) Bayer Leverkusen	London, England
20:00 GMT	Eze 36'; Rice 63'	Report	Palacios (yellow card) 46'	Stadium: Emirates Stadium; Attendance: 57,537; Referee: Danny Makkelie (Netherlands)

===== Quarter-final =====
The draw for the quarter-final was automatically determined after the round of 16 draw on 27 February 2026. As a result of Sporting CP overcoming a three-goal deficit from their first leg against Bodø/Glimt, Arsenal were drawn to play the Portuguese champions for the third time in the past four European campaigns. As a result of their higher seeding, the club played the second leg at home.

7 April 2026 First leg	Sporting CP (Portugal)	0–1	(The Football Association) Arsenal	Lisbon, Portugal
20:00 WEST (20:00 BST)	Morita (yellow card) 31'	Report	Havertz 90+1'	Stadium: Estádio José Alvalade; Attendance: 50,804; Referee: Daniel Siebert (Germany)

15 April 2026 Second leg	Arsenal (The Football Association)	0–0 (1–0 agg.)	(Portugal) Sporting CP	London, England
20:00 BST		Report	Araújo (yellow card) 79'	Stadium: Emirates Stadium; Attendance: 58,249; Referee: François Letexier (France)

===== Semi-final =====
The draw for the semi-final was automatically determined after the quarter-final draw on 27 February 2026. Arsenal faced Atlético Madrid for the second time in the competition (after a 4–0 home win in the League Phase), as a result of their defeat of Spanish rivals Barcelona 3–2 on aggregate in the previous round. Due to their higher seeding, the club once again played their second leg at home.

29 April 2026 First leg	Atlético Madrid (Spain)	1–1	(England) Arsenal	Madrid, Spain
21:00 CEST (20:00 BST)	Alvarez 56' (pen.); Hancko (yellow card) 78'	Report	Gyökeres 44' (pen.)	Stadium: Metropolitano Stadium; Attendance: 68,421; Referee: Danny Makkelie (Netherlands)

5 May 2026 Second leg	Arsenal (England)	1–0 (2–1 agg.)	(Spain) Atlético Madrid	London, England
20:00 BST	Saka 44'; Arrizabalaga (yellow card) 90+5'	Report	Pubill (yellow card) 81'; Koke (yellow card) 90+4'	Stadium: Emirates Stadium; Attendance: 58,874; Referee: Daniel Siebert (Germany)

===== Final =====
Having progressed past Atlético Madrid in the semi-finals, Arsenal reached only their second UEFA Champions League final in their history, having first done so in 2006. The club was seeking to win Europe's premier competition for the first time in their history and become the first team to play 14 or more matches in a single campaign and remain unbeaten. The Gunners faced holders Paris Saint-Germain for the second consecutive campaign, after the Parisians knocked the club out at the semi-final stage in the previous season. Arsenal would lose 4–3 on penalties following a 1–1 draw after regulation.

30 May 2026 Final	Paris Saint-Germain (France)	1–1 (a.e.t.) (4–3 p)	(England) Arsenal	Budapest, Hungary
18:00 CEST (17:00 BST)	Dembélé 65' (pen.); Neves (yellow card) 90+6'; Mendes (yellow card) 118'	Report	Havertz 6'; Mosquera (yellow card) 47'; Saka (yellow card) 54'; Gyökeres (yellow card) 98'; Rice (yellow card) 103'	Stadium: Puskás Aréna; Attendance: 61,035; Referee: Daniel Siebert (Germany)
	Penalties
	Ramos (penalty scored); Doué (penalty scored); Mendes (penalty missed); Hakimi (penalty scored); Beraldo (penalty scored)		(penalty scored) Gyökeres; (penalty missed) Eze; (penalty scored) Rice; (penalty scored) Martinelli; (penalty missed) Gabriel

== Statistics ==
Keys
Final score	The score at full time; Arsenal's listed first.	(N)	The game was played at a neutral site.
(H)	Arsenal were the home team.	(A)	Arsenal were the away team.
Opponent	The opponent team without a flag is English.		
Player^{*}	Player who joined Arsenal permanently or on loan during the season		
Player^{†}	Player who departed Arsenal permanently or on loan during the season		
Player^{^}	Arsenal U21s or U18s player who appeared for the first team during the season		
Player^{#}	Arsenal academy player who was registered as an U21 or U18 player during the season		

=== Appearances ===
The following 31 players made appearances for Arsenal's first team during the season.

Includes all competitions for senior teams. When two Arsenal players make their first team debuts at the same time, the Heritage number goes in order of who joined the club earlier.

2025–26 season
Squad number	Heritage number	Pos.	Player	Premier League	FA Cup	EFL Cup	Champions League	Season total	Career Club Total	Ref.
1	901	GK	(Spain) David Raya	37	0	0	14	51	147	
2	887	DF	(France) William Saliba	30+1	1+1	5	12	50	184	
3	919	DF	(Spain) Cristhian Mosquera^{*}	9+11	3	2	6+4	35	35	
4	882	DF	(England) Ben White	9+3	3	4	7+4	30	190	
5	922	DF	(Ecuador) Piero Hincapié^{*}	20+5	0+1	3	7+3	39	39	
6	872	DF	(Brazil) Gabriel Magalhães	30+2	2	3+2	11+1	51	261	
7	862	FW	(England) Bukayo Saka	25+6	1+1	3+2	8+3	49	312	
8	879	MF	(Norway) Martin Ødegaard	16+8	1+1	1+1	5+3	36	234	
9	888	FW	(Brazil) Gabriel Jesus	3+11	4	1+2	1+5	27	123	
10	920	FW	(England) Eberechi Eze^{*}	21+11	2+1	4	9+4	52	52	
11	867	FW	(Brazil) Gabriel Martinelli	11+19	4	3+2	7+7	53	278	
12	899	DF	(Netherlands) Jurriën Timber	28+2	0+2	3+1	6+2	44	95	
13	923	GK	(Spain) Kepa Arrizabalaga^{*}	1	4	6	1	12	12	
14	916	FW	(Sweden) Viktor Gyökeres^{*}	26+10	0+2	3+1	11+2	55	55	
16	921	MF	(Denmark) Christian Nørgaard^{*}	1+6	4	3	3+3	20	20	
19	895	FW	(Belgium) Leandro Trossard	21+10	1+1	2+4	8+3	50	174	
20	917	FW	(England) Noni Madueke^{*}	16+10	3+1	2+1	6+4	43	43	
22	893	MF	(England) Ethan Nwaneri^{†}	0+6	1	2	1+2	12	51	
23	910	MF	(Spain) Mikel Merino	10+12	1	3+1	6+1	34	78	
29	898	FW	(Germany) Kai Havertz	7+5	2+1	1+2	2+4	24	111	
33	903	DF	(Italy) Riccardo Calafiori	22+4	1+1	1+1	4+2	36	65	
35	911	GK	(England) Tommy Setford	0	0+1	0	0	1	2	
36	915	MF	(Spain) Martín Zubimendi^{*}	34+4	0+3	3	11+2	57	57	
41	900	MF	(England) Declan Rice	35+1	0	3+3	11+2	55	158	
49	905	MF	(England) Myles Lewis-Skelly	5+15	3	3	8+2	36	75	
52	928	DF	(England) Jaden Dixon	0	0+1	0	0	1	1	
56	918	MF	(England) Max Dowman^{^}	1+5	2	1+1	0+3	13	13	
71	924	FW	(England) Andre Harriman-Annous^{^}	0	0	1	0+1	2	2	
72	927	MF	(England) Ife Ibrahim^{^}	0	0	0	0+1	1	1	
81	926	FW	(England) Brando Bailey-Joseph^{^}	0	0	0	0+1	1	1	
89	925	DF	(England) Marli Salmon^{^}	0	1+2	0	0+1	4	4	

=== Goals ===
Arsenal scored 121 goals in all competitions during the season.

The following 20 players scored in all competitions during the season.

Includes all competitions for senior teams. The list is sorted by squad number when season-total goals are equal. Players with no goals are not included in the list.

2025–26 season
Rk.	No.	Pos.	Player	Premier League	FA Cup	EFL Cup	Champions League	Season total	Career club total	Ref.
1	14	FW	(Sweden) Viktor Gyökeres^{*}	14	1	1	5	21	21	
2	7	FW	(England) Bukayo Saka	7	0	1	3	11	81	
2	11	FW	(Brazil) Gabriel Martinelli	1	4	0	6	11	62	
4	10	FW	(England) Eberechi Eze^{*}	7	1	1	1	10	10	
5	19	FW	(Belgium) Leandro Trossard	6	0	1	1	8	36	
5	20	FW	(England) Noni Madueke^{*}	3	2	0	3	8	8	
7	29	FW	(Germany) Kai Havertz	2	0	1	4	7	36	
8	9	FW	(Brazil) Gabriel Jesus	3	1	0	2	6	32	
8	23	MF	(Spain) Mikel Merino	4	0	0	2	6	15	
8	36	MF	(Spain) Martín Zubimendi^{*}	5	0	1	0	6	6	
11	41	MF	(England) Declan Rice	4	0	0	1	5	21	
12	6	DF	(Brazil) Gabriel Magalhães	3	0	0	1	4	24	
12	12	DF	(Netherlands) Jurriën Timber	3	0	0	1	4	6	
14	2	DF	(France) William Saliba	1	0	0	0	1	8	
14	4	DF	(England) Ben White	0	0	1	0	1	7	
14	5	DF	(Ecuador) Piero Hincapié^{*}	1	0	0	0	1	1	
14	8	MF	(Norway) Martin Ødegaard	1	0	0	0	1	42	
14	22	MF	(England) Ethan Nwaneri^{†}	0	0	1	0	1	10	
14	33	DF	(Italy) Riccardo Calafiori	1	0	0	0	1	4	
14	56	FW	(England) Max Dowman	1	0	0	0	1	1	
Own goal(s)				4	2	1	0	7		
Total				71	11	9	30	121		

==== Hat-tricks ====
Includes all competitions for senior teams. Players with no hat-tricks not included in the list.

- Score - The score at the time of each goal. Arsenal's score listed first.

Date	No.	Pos.	Player	Score	Final score	Opponent	Competition	Ref.
23 Nov 2025	10	FW	(England) Eberechi Eze^{*}	2–0, 3–0, 4–1	4–1 (H)	Tottenham Hotspur	Premier League	
11 Jan 2026	11	FW	(Brazil) Gabriel Martinelli	2–1, 3–1, 4–1	4–1 (A)	Portsmouth	FA Cup	

=== Disciplinary record ===
Includes all competitions for senior teams. The list is sorted by red cards, then yellow cards (and by squad number when total cards are equal). Players with no cards are not included in the list.

Rk.	No.	Pos.	Player	Premier League			FA Cup			EFL Cup			Champions League			Total			Ref.
Rk.	No.	Pos.	Player	Yellow card	Second yellow card	Red card	Yellow card	Second yellow card	Red card	Yellow card	Second yellow card	Red card	Yellow card	Second yellow card	Red card	Yellow card	Second yellow card	Red card	Ref.
1	36	MF	(Spain) Martín Zubimendi^{*}	4	0	0	0	0	0	0	0	0	4	0	0	8	0	0	
2	33	DF	(Italy) Riccardo Calafiori	5	0	0	1	0	0	0	0	0	1	0	0	7	0	0	
2	41	MF	(England) Declan Rice	3	0	0	0	0	0	0	0	0	4	0	0	7	0	0	
4	12	DF	(Netherlands) Jurriën Timber	5	0	0	0	0	0	1	0	0	0	0	0	6	0	0	
4	14	FW	(Sweden) Viktor Gyökeres^{*}	5	0	0	0	0	0	0	0	0	1	0	0	6	0	0	
4	49	MF	(England) Myles Lewis-Skelly	3	0	0	2	0	0	0	0	0	1	0	0	6	0	0	
7	3	DF	(Spain) Cristhian Mosquera^{*}	4	0	0	0	0	0	0	0	0	1	0	0	5	0	0	
7	6	DF	(Brazil) Gabriel Magalhães	4	0	0	0	0	0	0	0	0	1	0	0	5	0	0	
7	11	FW	(Brazil) Gabriel Martinelli	3	0	0	1	0	0	0	0	0	1	0	0	5	0	0	
7	23	MF	(Spain) Mikel Merino	1	0	0	0	0	0	1	0	0	3	0	0	5	0	0	
11	13	GK	(Spain) Kepa Arrizabalaga^{*}	0	0	0	0	0	0	3	0	0	1	0	0	4	0	0	
12	2	DF	(France) William Saliba	2	0	0	0	0	0	0	0	0	1	0	0	3	0	0	
12	4	DF	(England) Ben White	0	0	0	1	0	0	1	0	0	1	0	0	3	0	0	
12	5	DF	(Ecuador) Piero Hincapié^{*}	2	0	0	0	0	0	1	0	0	0	0	0	3	0	0	
12	7	FW	(England) Bukayo Saka	2	0	0	0	0	0	0	0	0	1	0	0	3	0	0	
12	9	FW	(Brazil) Gabriel Jesus	3	0	0	0	0	0	0	0	0	0	0	0	3	0	0	
12	16	MF	(Denmark) Christian Nørgaard^{*}	0	0	0	1	0	0	0	0	0	2	0	0	3	0	0	
12	19	FW	(Belgium) Leandro Trossard	2	0	0	0	0	0	1	0	0	0	0	0	3	0	0	
19	10	FW	(England) Eberechi Eze^{*}	1	0	0	1	0	0	0	0	0	0	0	0	2	0	0	
19	29	FW	(Germany) Kai Havertz	1	0	0	0	0	0	0	0	0	1	0	0	2	0	0	
21	1	GK	(Spain) David Raya	1	0	0	0	0	0	0	0	0	0	0	0	1	0	0	
21	20	FW	(England) Noni Madueke^{*}	0	0	0	0	0	0	0	0	0	1	0	0	1	0	0	
21	22	MF	(England) Ethan Nwaneri^{†}	0	0	0	0	0	0	0	0	0	1	0	0	1	0	0	
Total				51	0	0	7	0	0	8	0	0	26	0	0	92	0	0	

=== Clean sheets ===
Includes all competitions for senior teams.

2025–26 season									Career club total	Ref.
Rk.	No.	Goalkeeper	Premier League	FA Cup	EFL Cup	Champions League	Season total	Season percentage	Career club total	Ref.
1	1	(Spain) David Raya	19	0	0	9	28	55% (28/51)	67	
2	13	(Spain) Kepa Arrizabalaga^{*}	0	1	3	0	4	33% (4/12)	4	
Total			19	1	3	9	32	51% (32/63)		

== Awards and nominations ==
Keys
M	Matches	W	Won	D	Drawn	L	Lost
Pts	Points	GF	Goals for	GA	Goals against	GD	Goal difference
Pos.	Position	Pld	Played	G	Goals	A	Assists
CS	Clean sheets (for defenders and goalkeepers)			S	Saves (for goalkeepers)		
Final score	The score at full time; Arsenal's listed first.			(N)	The game was played at a neutral site.		
(H)	Arsenal were the home team.			(A)	Arsenal were the away team.		
Opponent	The opponent team without a flag is English.						
Player^{*}	Player who joined Arsenal permanently or on loan during the season						
Player^{†}	Player who departed Arsenal permanently or on loan during the season						
Player^{^}	Player who was registered as an Arsenal U21 or U18 player during the season						

=== Monthly awards ===
==== Arsenal Player of the Month ====
The winner of the award was chosen via a poll on the club's official website.

Month	Pos.	Player	Pld	G	A	CS	Votes	Ref.
August 2025	DF	(Italy) Riccardo Calafiori	3	1	2	2	52%	
September 2025	FW	(Brazil) Gabriel Martinelli	5	2	1	–	54%	
October 2025	DF	(Brazil) Gabriel Magalhães	6	1	2	6	45%	
November 2025	MF	(England) Eberechi Eze^{*}	6	3	1	–	35%	
December 2025	FW	(Belgium) Leandro Trossard	6	2	1	–	40%	
January 2026	FW	(Sweden) Viktor Gyökeres*	8	4	2	–	48%	
February 2026	DF	(Ecuador) Piero Hincapié*	5	1	1	2	65%	
March 2026	MF	(England) Eberechi Eze*	6	2	0	–	37%	
April 2026	DF	(Ecuador) Piero Hincapié*	5	0	0	2	60%	
May 2026	GK	(Spain) David Raya	5	0	0	4	N/A	

==== Arsenal Goal of the Month ====
The winner of the award was chosen from goals scored by men's, women's and academy teams via a poll on the club's official website.

- Score – The score at the time of the goal. Arsenal's score listed first.
- Player^{◊} – Women's first-team player

Month	Pos.	Player	Score	Final score	Opponent	Competition	Date	Votes	Ref.
August 2025	FW	(England) Bukayo Saka	2–0 (H)	5–0 (H)	Leeds United	Premier League	23 August	45%	
September 2025	MF	(Spain) Martín Zubimendi^{*}	1–0 (H)	3–0 (H)	Nottingham Forest	Premier League	13 September	42%	
October 2025	MF	(England) Eberechi Eze^{*}	1–0 (H)	1–0 (H)	Crystal Palace	Premier League	26 October	37%	
November 2025	MF	(England) Eberechi Eze^{*}	4–1 (H)	4–1 (H)	Tottenham Hotspur	Premier League	23 November	N/A	
December 2025	FW	(England) Noni Madueke^{*}	1–0 (A)	3–0 (A)	Club Brugge	Champions League	10 December	N/A	
January 2026	FW	(Sweden) Viktor Gyökeres^{*}	3–1 (A)	3–1 (A)	Inter Milan	Champions League	20 January	N/A	
February 2026	FW	(Sweden) Viktor Gyökeres^{*}	2–1 (A)	4–1 (A)	Tottenham Hotspur	Premier League	22 February	36%	
March 2026	FW	(England) Max Dowman^{^}	2–0 (H)	2–0 (H)	Everton	Premier League	14 March	42%	
April 2026	DF	(England) Leah Williamson^{◊}	7–0 (H)	7–0 (H)	Leicester City Women	Women's Super League	29 April	42%	
May 2026	FW	(Germany) Kai Havertz	1–0 (H)	1–1 (N)	Paris Saint-Germain	Champions League	30 May	N/A	

==== Premier League Manager of the Month ====
The winner of the award was chosen by a combination of an online public vote and a panel of experts.

Month	Manager	M	W	D	L	GF	GA	GD	Pts	Pos	Result	Ref.
September 2025	(Spain) Mikel Arteta	3	2	1	0	6	2	+4	7	2nd	Nominated	
October 2025	(Spain) Mikel Arteta	3	3	0	0	4	0	+4	9	1st	Nominated	
November 2025	(Spain) Mikel Arteta	4	2	2	0	9	4	+5	8	1st	Nominated	
December 2025	(Spain) Mikel Arteta	6	5	0	1	12	5	+7	15	1st	Nominated	
March 2026	(Spain) Mikel Arteta	3	3	0	0	5	1	+4	9	1st	Won	

==== Premier League Player of the Month ====
The winner of the award was chosen by a combination of an online public vote, a panel of experts, and the captain of each Premier League club.

Month	Pos.	Player	Pld	G	A	CS	S	Result	Ref.
August 2025	DF	(Italy) Riccardo Calafiori	3	1	2	2	–	Nominated	
September 2025	MF	(Spain) Martín Zubimendi^{*}	3	2	0	–	–	Nominated	
October 2025	DF	(Netherlands) Jurrien Timber	3	0	0	3	–	Nominated	
November 2025	MF	(England) Declan Rice	4	1	1	–	–	Nominated	
February 2026	FW	(Sweden) Viktor Gyökeres	4	4	0	–	–	Nominated	
March 2026	GK	(Spain) David Raya	3	0	0	2	9	Nominated	

==== Premier League Goal of the Month ====
The winner of the award was chosen by a combination of an online public vote and a panel of experts.

- Score – The score at the time of the goal. Arsenal's score listed first.

Month	Pos.	Player	Score	Final score	Opponent	Date	Result	Ref.
September 2025	MF	(Spain) Martín Zubimendi^{*}	1–0 (H)	3–0 (H)	Nottingham Forest	13 September 2025	Won	
February 2026	MF	(Spain) Martín Zubimendi^{*}	1–0 (H)	3–0 (H)	Sunderland	7 February 2026	Nominated	

==== Premier League Save of the Month ====
The winner of the award was chosen by a combination of an online public vote and a panel of experts.

- Score – The score at the time of the save. Arsenal's score listed first.

Month	Goalkeeper	Score	Final score	Opponent	Shot taker	Date	Result	Ref.
December 2025	(Spain) David Raya	1–0 (H)	2–0 (H)	Brentford	Kevin Schade	3 December 2025	Nominated	
December 2025	(Spain) David Raya	2–1 (H)	2–1 (H)	Brighton & Hove Albion	Yankuba Minteh	27 December 2025	Won	
February 2026	(Spain) David Raya	0–0 (A)	1–1 (A)	Brentford	Igor Thiago	12 February 2026	Nominated	
March 2026	(Spain) David Raya	2–1 (H)	2–1 (H)	Chelsea	Alejandro Garnacho	1 March 2026	Nominated	
