= Ife Ibrahim =

English footballer (born 2008)

Personal information
- Full name: Ifeoluwa David Ibrahim
- Date of birth: 20 January 2008 (age 18)
- Place of birth: Newham, England
- Position: Midfielder

Team information
- Current team: Arsenal
- Number: 44

Youth career
- 2015–2026: Arsenal

Senior career*
Years	Team	Apps	(Gls)
2026–	Arsenal	0	(0)

International career^{‡}
2023	England U16	3	(0)
2025–	England U18	4	(0)
- * Club domestic league appearances and goals as of 15:13, 28 January 2026 (UTC) ‡ National team caps and goals as of 14:33, 3 June 2026 (UTC)

Ifeoluwa David Ibrahim (born 20 January 2008) is an English professional footballer who plays as a midfielder for Premier League club Arsenal.

== Club career ==
Ibrahim is a youth product for Arsenal, having joined at the age of 7. On 27 January 2026, he signed his first professional contract with the club. The next day he debuted with Arsenal as a substitute in a 3–2 UEFA Champions League win over FC Kairat on 28 January 2026.

== International career ==
Born in England, Ibrahim is of Nigerian descent. He is a youth international for England, having played for the England U18s in October 2025.

== Career statistics ==
=== Club ===
As of match played 27 October 2026

Appearances and goals by club, season and competition
Club	Season	League			FA Cup		EFL Cup		Europe		Other		Total	
Club	Season	Division	Apps	Goals	Apps	Goals	Apps	Goals	Apps	Goals	Apps	Goals	Apps	Goals
Arsenal U21	2025–26	—									3 (Note: Appearance(s) in EFL Trophy)	0	3	0
Arsenal U21	2026–27	—									2	0	2	0
Arsenal U21	Total		—								5	0	5	0
Arsenal	2025–26	Premier League	0	0	0	0	0	0	1 (Note: Appearance in UEFA Champions League)	0	—		1	0
Arsenal	2026–27	Premier League	0	0	0	0	1	0	0	0	0	0	1	0
Arsenal	Total		0	0	0	0	1	0	1	0	0	0	2	0
Career total			0	0	0	0	1	0	1	0	5	0	7	0
