= Brando Bailey-Joseph =

English footballer (born 2008)

Personal information
- Full name: Brando Nyle Bailey-Joseph
- Date of birth: 2 October 2008 (age 18)
- Place of birth: Enfield, England
- Position: Winger

Team information
- Current team: Arsenal
- Number: 71

Youth career
- 2015–2026: Arsenal

Senior career*
Years	Team	Apps	(Gls)
2026–	Arsenal	0	(0)

International career^{‡}
2024	England U16	2	(0)
- * Club domestic league appearances and goals as of 15:13, 28 January 2026 (UTC) ‡ National team caps and goals as of 15:13, 28 January 2026 (UTC)

Brando Nyle Bailey-Joseph (born 2 October 2008) is an English professional footballer who plays as a winger for Premier League club Arsenal.

== Club career ==
Having played for Winchmore Hill F.C. youth for two seasons in their Under-Seven and Under-Eight teams, Bailey-Joseph was scouted by Arsenal and worked his way up through all their youth categories. On 16 July 2025, he signed a scholarship contract with Arsenal. On 16 October 2025, Bailey-Joseph signed his first professional contract with Arsenal for two seasons. He debuted as a substitute for Arsenal in a 3–2 UEFA Champions League win over FC Kairat on 28 January 2026.

== International career ==
Born in England, Bailey-Joseph is of Jamaican and Saint Lucian descent. He is a youth international for England, having played for the England U16s in 2024.

== Career statistics ==
=== Club ===
As of match played 28 January 2026

Appearances and goals by club, season and competition
Club	Season	League			FA Cup		EFL Cup		Europe		Total	
Club	Season	Division	Apps	Goals	Apps	Goals	Apps	Goals	Apps	Goals	Apps	Goals
Arsenal	2025–26	Premier League	0	0	0	0	0	0	1 (Note: Appearance in UEFA Champions League)	0	1	0
Career total			0	0	0	0	0	0	1	0	1	0
