= Tom Edozie =

English footballer (born 2006)

Personal information
- Full name: Thomas Edozie
- Date of birth: 18 May 2006 (age 20)
- Place of birth: Lewisham, England
- Height: 5 ft 10 in (1.78 m)
- Position: Winger

Team information
- Current team: Wolverhampton Wanderers
- Number: 74

Youth career
- 2022–2026: Wolverhampton Wanderers

Senior career*
Years	Team	Apps	(Gls)
2026–	Wolverhampton Wanderers	3	(1)
- * Club domestic league appearances and goals

Thomas Edozie (born 18 May 2006) is an English professional footballer who plays as a winger for club Wolverhampton Wanderers.

== Club career ==
=== Early career ===
Edozie was born in Lewisham, South London. He began training in the XYZ Academy in 2021, where his gifted abilities were noticed. He signed for Wolverhampton Wanderers in 2022, playing for their youth, U18, and U21 teams in short succession.

=== Wolverhampton Wanderers ===
After impressing in the academy, newly appointed manager Rob Edwards selected Edozie for the senior team. Following bench appearances against Chelsea, Nottingham Forest, and Grimsby Town, Edozie made his senior debut against Arsenal. Trailing 1–2, Edozie scored the equalizing goal in the 90+4th minute.

== Personal life ==
He is the younger brother of Southampton footballer Samuel Edozie.
