= Elián Quesada-Thorn =

Costa Rican footballer (born 2005)

Personal information
- Full name: Kristopher Elián Quesada-Thorn
- Date of birth: 19 February 2005 (age 21)
- Place of birth: London, England
- Height: 1.81 m (5 ft 11 in)
- Position: Left-back

Team information
- Current team: Municipal Pérez Zeledón (on loan from Alajuelense)
- Number: 18

Youth career
- –2015: Whetstone Wanderers
- 2015–2025: Arsenal

Senior career*
Years	Team	Apps	(Gls)
2025–	Alajuelense	5	(0)
2026–	→ Municipal Pérez Zeledón (loan)	4	(1)
- * Club domestic league appearances and goals as of 03:55, 11 September 2026 (UTC) ‡ National team caps and goals as of 3 August 2026

Kristopher Elián Quesada-Thorn (born 19 February 2005) is a professional footballer who plays as a left-back for Liga FPD club Municipal Pérez Zeledón, on loan from club Alajuelense. Born in England, he is a Costa Rica at youth level.

== Club career ==
Quesada-Thorn began playing football when he was two or three years old, where he played with his father at indoor football camps, during a time where he could hardly walk. He joined his first Sunday league club Whetstone Wanderers in Woodside Park, London when he was six years old. Quesada-Thorn played for Whetstone Wanderers for "a good five years or so" until he played against an Arsenal academy team when he was twelve years old; he claimed to have played really well on the day and Arsenal invited him to trial with the club. After a successful trial with Arsenal, he joined the club in 2015, despite previously trialing with the Reading, West Ham United and Tottenham Hotspur academies.

Quesada-Thorn made his EFL Trophy debut for the Arsenal under-21 team on 20 September 2022 against Ipswich Town, he started the game at left back which ended in a 2–0 away loss at Portman Road. In March 2023, he suffered a stress fracture in his back, ruling him out of the remainder of the 2022–23 academy season. He signed his first professional contract with the club on 6 July 2023, stating that "I've been dreaming of this [signing the contract] from when I was a young kid at Hale End, so it's a great moment for me."

He departed Arsenal in June 2025. On July 19, 2025, he signed for Alajuelense on a free transfer and with a contract until June 2027.

== International career ==
Quesada-Thorn is eligible to represent four different countries in international football, Costa Rica through his father, Sweden through his maternal grandfather, the Republic of Ireland through his maternal grandmother, and England as his country of birth.

In January 2022, Quesada was called up to the Costa Rica national under-20 team to participate in two unofficial friendly games against Mexico. In an interview before playing for the Costa Rica under-20 team, he claimed that the other nations had not yet reached out to the player, instead that he has only held conversations with the Costa Rican Football Federation. In an interview with ESPN Deportes, Quesada-Thorn's father claimed that his son was "very happy and excited" to have the opportunity to play with the youth international team. In September 2023, he was called up to the Costa Rica senior team to play friendlies against Saudi Arabia and the United Arab Emirates; he did not feature in either match as he withdrew from the squad due to injury.

== Personal life ==
Quesada-Thorn is a boyhood Arsenal fan, upon signing his first professional contract with the club, he stated on 6 July 2023 that "I'm a boyhood fan, as soon as they offered [the contract], I feel like there was no question".

== Career statistics ==
=== Club ===
As of match played 20 September 2022

Appearances and goals by club, season and competition
Club	Season	League			FA Cup		EFL Cup		Other		Total	
Club	Season	Division	Apps	Goals	Apps	Goals	Apps	Goals	Apps	Goals	Apps	Goals
Arsenal U21	2022–23	—	—		—		—		1 (Note: Appearance in EFL Trophy)	0	1	0
Career total			—		—		—		1	0	1	0
