= Arsenal F.C.–Manchester City F.C. rivalry =

English football club rivalry

Arsenal v Manchester City
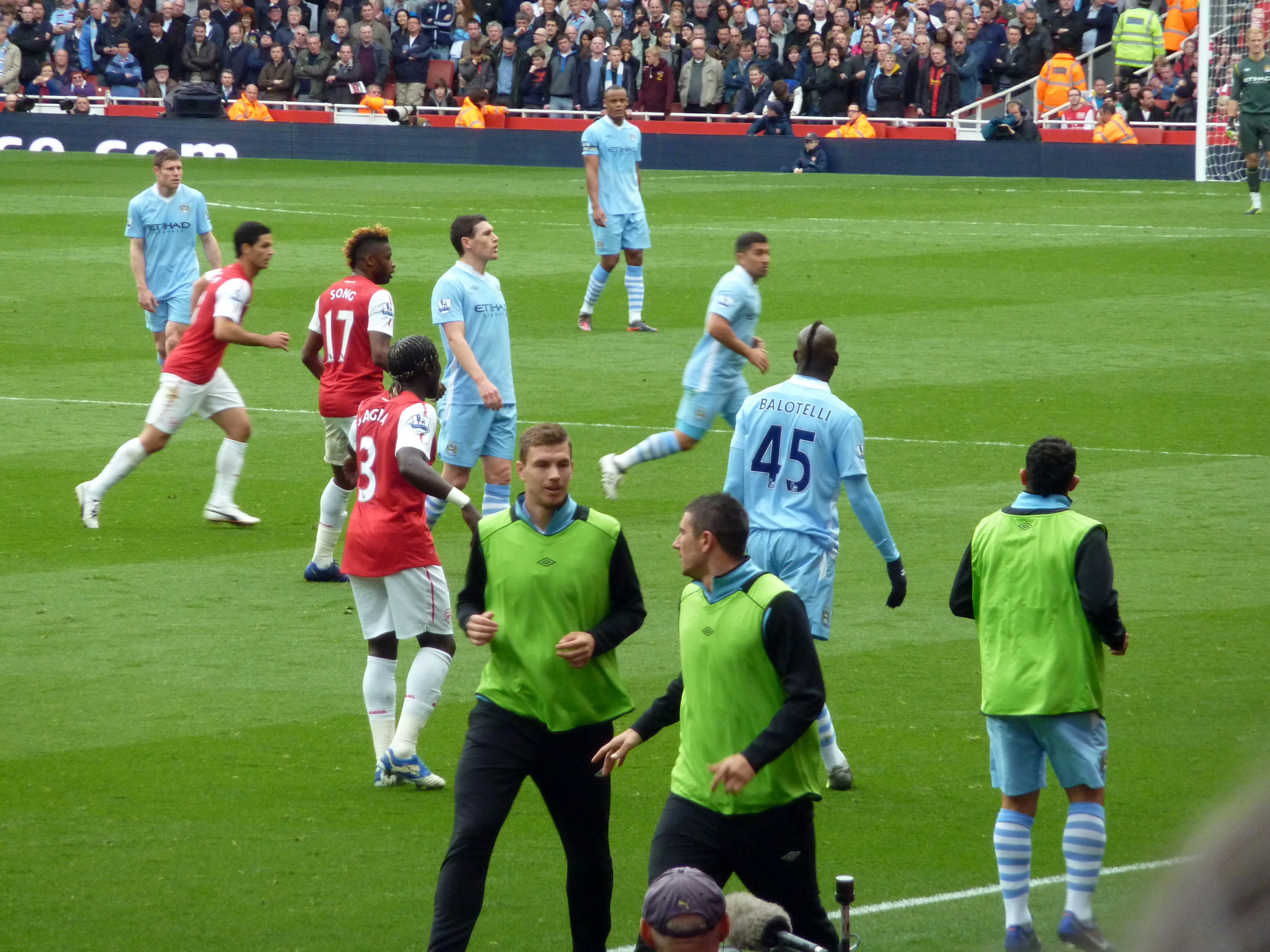
- Manchester City and Arsenal players in a match at the Emirates Stadium in 2012.
- Teams: Arsenal; Manchester City
- First meeting: 11 November 1893; Football League Second Division; Woolwich Arsenal 1–0 Ardwick
- Latest meeting: 16 August 2026; Community Shield; Arsenal 3-0 Manchester City
- Next meeting: 29 November 2026; Premier League
- Stadiums: Emirates Stadium (Arsenal); City of Manchester Stadium (Manchester City)

Statistics
- Total meetings: 216
- All-time series: Arsenal: 100; Drawn: 49; Manchester City: 67
- Largest victory: Arsenal 5–0 Manchester City (27 October 2000); Manchester City 5–0 Arsenal (28 August 2021)
- Largest goal scoring: Arsenal 7–3 Manchester City (6 October 1956)

The rivalry between English professional football clubs Arsenal and Manchester City began in 2008 after Manchester City were the subject of major financial investment. Prior to this, Arsenal were one of the stronger teams in English football, last winning the Premier League in 2003–04, and had not finished behind City since 1993. Arsenal saw several important players such as Emmanuel Adebayor and Samir Nasri leave for Manchester City. Arsenal's then-manager Arsène Wenger criticised City's transfer policy and financial strategy. In 2012 City won their first English title since 1968, and would go on to win several more over the following decade. Arsenal would win several FA Cups in this period, but would rarely pose a threat to City in the Premier League. The two clubs competed for the Premier League title throughout the 2022–23 season with Arsenal leading for significant periods of the season, and during the 2023–24 season but City prevailed both times; however, they lost out to Arsenal in the 2025–26 season.

== Rivalry ==
=== Early history (1893–2008) ===
Arsenal and Manchester City were not traditional rivals, the first game between the two clubs was a Football League Division Two match between Woolwich Arsenal and Ardwick on 11 November 1893, ending in a 1–0 win for Arsenal. The first 14 games between the two teams were played in the second division with City winning 8, Arsenal with 4 and 2 draws.

Arsenal historically have had more success certainly during the 1990s and early 2000s. At the time of the Abu Dhabi United Group takeover of City in 2008, Arsenal had won thirteen domestic top-flight league titles, ten FA cups and two Football League Cups; City, conversely had won only two domestic top-flight league titles, four FA Cups and two Football League Cups. Arsenal under Arsène Wenger had also finished runners-up in the 2006 UEFA Champions League final and had been a consistent challenging team domestically since winning their first Premier League title in 1998. By 2008, Arsenal had not finished outside the top four since the 1995–96 season, whereas City had not finished in the top four since the 1977–78 season, although they did finish a place higher than Arsenal in the inaugural Premier League season in 1992–93. Despite finishing lower, Arsenal defeated City 1–0 on both occasions during the season.

=== Abu Dhabi takeover and players move to City (2008–2014) ===
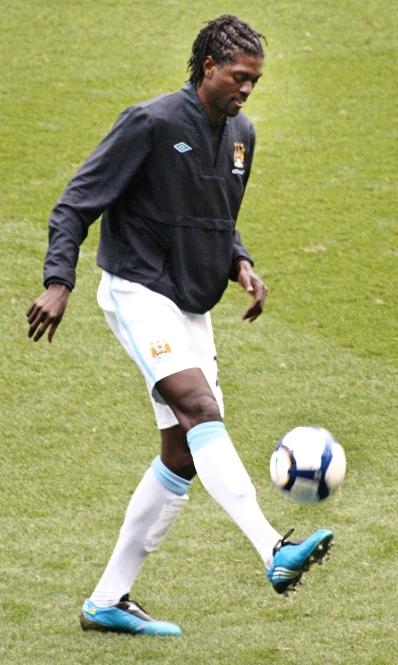
Emmanuel Adebayor joined City from Arsenal in 2009.

Following Manchester City's takeover by the Abu Dhabi United Group in 2008, the club's increased spending on players began to rile several opposition managers with Arsène Wenger being particularly outspoken in his disapproval of City's financial approach on numerous occasions.

During the summer of 2009, City, who had finished 10th in the previous season (six places behind Arsenal in 4th), would move to sign Gunners pair Emmanuel Adebayor and Kolo Touré. Adebayor had been the Gunners' second-highest goal scorer in the previous season, where Toure was the club's vice-captain and a former Premier League winner who had amassed 326 appearances across all competitions.

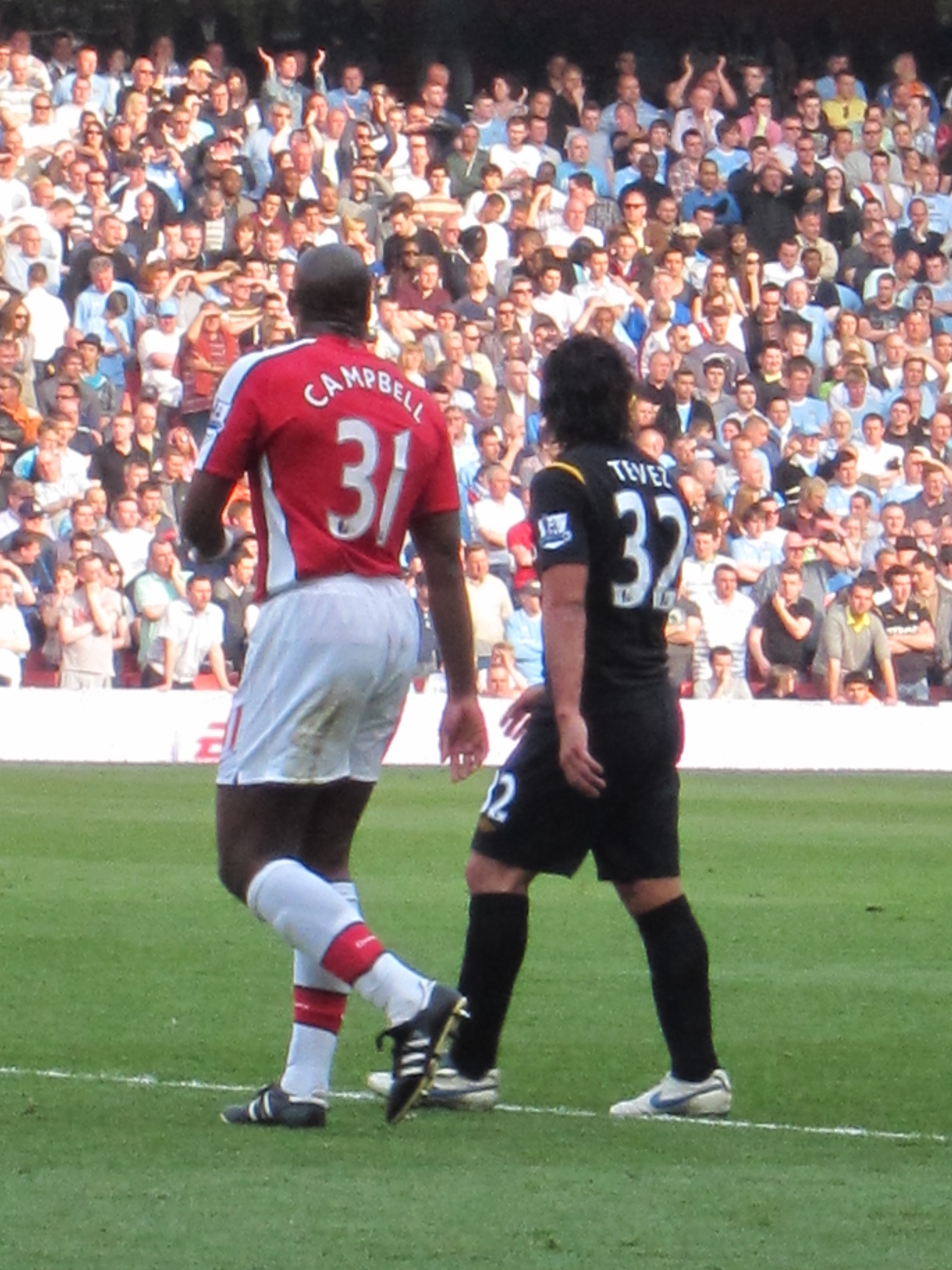
Arsenal's Sol Campbell and City's Carlos Tevez during the 2009–10 season.

In the first game between the two teams during the 2009–10 season, City would win 4–2 at home with Adebayor scoring the third goal that, at the time, put City ahead; he would then run the length of the pitch before sliding on his knees and celebrating in front of the Arsenal supporters. During the game he had caused controversy with a late tackle on Cesc Fàbregas and flicking a boot in the face of Robin van Persie. Adebayor received a yellow card and would later apologise for "losing his head" after what he described as two hours of abuse from Arsenal fans: "I was in my spiritual zone. Kolo Toure said to me: 'I was looking at the pictures and you did not flinch once.' I did not feel human anymore. The abuse was too much. I was ready to die. I just looked at them and thought 'There are things you do not do.'" In 2018, Adebayor stated that he still hates both Arsenal and Arsene Wenger, recalling the moment in a TV interview where Wenger had described his move as money orientated. City would also complete the transfers of former Arsenal players and previous Wenger signings Sylvinho from Barcelona, and club legend Patrick Vieira from Inter Milan, adding to an increasing number of ex-Gunners players in the City ranks.

Wenger would also publicly criticise City's sponsorship deal with Etihad Airways, accusing the club of bending UEFA's fair play rules.

In the summer of 2011, City added two more of Arsenal's more important players, the signing of long-standing left-back Gaël Clichy as well as Samir Nasri, who had made the PFA Team of the Year and had scored 15 goals from midfield in the previous season. Prior to the Nasri transfer, Wenger accused City manager Roberto Mancini of being "disrespectful" and "out of order" in a press conference, voicing his disapproval at Mancini answering a question stating he hoped a deal could be done for Nasri. Due to criticism, Nasri protested that his move to City was about winning titles and not money, before going on to criticise Arsenal's transfer policy.

During the run in for the 2011–12 season, City, who were fighting Manchester United for the title, were beaten 1–0 by Arsenal in a game that was marred by the sending off of City striker Mario Balotelli as fractures were seen between the relationship of the player and his manager Roberto Mancini. Despite being eight points adrift following the game, City would go on to win their first title on the final day of the season.

In September 2012, Mancini criticised Wenger for constantly complaining about City spending money, claiming that Arsenal have also spent big money on players. In 2013, a video posted to the internet appeared to show Nasri being abused by Arsenal fans as he entered the Emirates Stadium; in a later interview, Nasri branded the fans as "stupid", and opened up about the abuse he had received since leaving for City.

Bacary Sagna became the most recent Arsenal player to transfer to City under the Wenger era at the beginning of the 2014–15 season, although the transfer had less impact on Arsenal than the others given the players contract was about to expire. Wenger would criticise City once again by claiming the clubs decision to sign Frank Lampard from Chelsea via New York City FC, which was a part of the City Football Group that also owns Manchester City, was a way to get around FFP rules. City manager Manuel Pellegrini said he was surprised by Wenger's outburst given Lampard was a free transfer having been released by Chelsea. The following week Arsenal would defeat City 3–0 in the 2014 FA Community Shield.

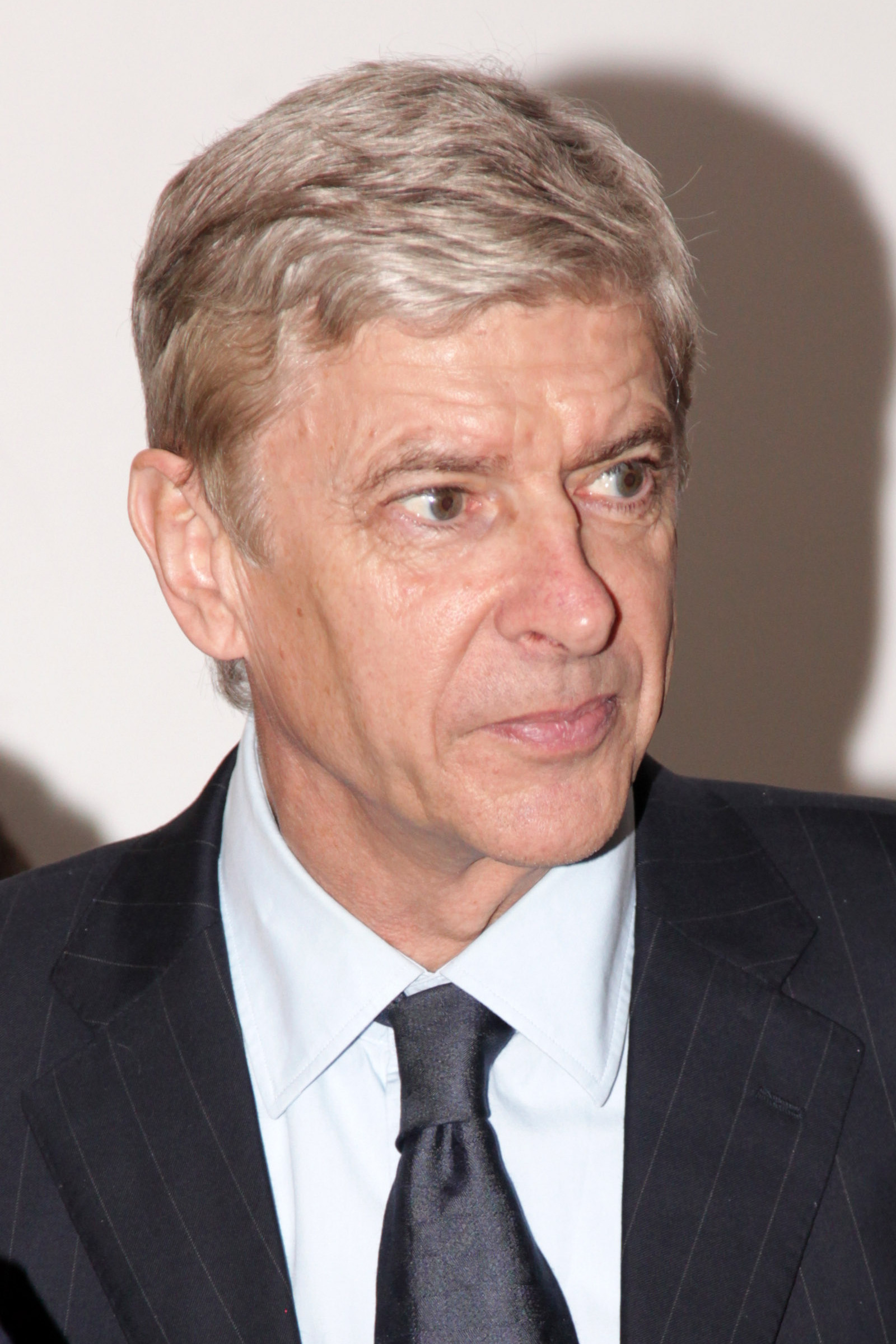
Arsène Wenger manager of Arsenal from 1996 until 2018.

=== Arsenal decline and City domination (2014–2022) ===
"I'm not an Arsenal fan, I am not from London. If we want to be honest, we are players who look at what is in the best interests for us and our career. When Manchester City came, it was the best choice for me to come here. And today I have won trophies, I am really happy, I have everything and I have a better life."

— Samir Nasri on the abuse he received from Arsenal fans following his transfer to City, 2014

By the end of the 2016–17 season, following the appointment Pep Guardiola as City manager the three final ex-Arsenal players Clichy, Nasri and Sagna were released, therefore the on-the field rivalry cooled, despite Guardiola appointing former Arsenal midfielder Mikel Arteta as his assistant coach.

Despite Arsenal continuing to triumph in domestic cup competitions, adding the FA Cup in both 2017 and 2020, they began to regress and struggle in the League, posting finishes between 5th and 8th between 2015–16 and 2019–20, where as City would go on to gain four titles between 2017–18 and 2021–22, and cementing themselves as the dominant force in English football over the last decade.

The two clubs would meet in the 2018 EFL Cup final at Wembley Stadium, the first competitive final between the two teams. City would run out comfortable winners in a 3–0 victory with goals from Sergio Aguero, Vincent Kompany and David Silva. Days later City would defeat Arsenal 3–0 again in the League with a victory at the Emirates Stadium that piled pressure on Wenger. Wenger would leave the club at the end of the 2017–18 season.

=== Title rivals (2022–present) ===
In 2019, Guardiola's former City assistant manager Mikel Arteta returned to Arsenal as their new manager, replacing Unai Emery who had been sacked, although by the end of the 2021–22 season City had extended their unbeaten run against Arsenal in the League to 13 games, with Guardiola losing his first game to Arteta in a 2–0 FA Cup defeat on 18 July 2020.

In the summer of 2022, City agreed to the sale of Gabriel Jesus and Oleksandr Zinchenko to Arsenal with both players reuniting with Arteta. With Arsenal finishing 5th in the previous season, Sky Sports pundit Roy Keane expressed his belief that the pair had been allowed to join Arsenal because City no longer considered the Gunners a direct threat. Guardiola explained the transfers by saying all-parties were happy with the outcome.

Arsenal carved out a lead in the Premier League and by the time the two teams met in February 2023 they led City by three points. In the game at the Emirates, City went on to win the game 3–1 and temporarily leapfrogged Arsenal at the top of the league. City also defeated the Gunners 1–0 in the FA Cup on their way to winning the tournament. In a contrast to Arsenal fans in the past, City fans gave Oleksandr Zinchenko a standing ovation upon his return to the City of Manchester Stadium, he thanked fans by saying "There are no old friends - there are friends with whom there are many good memories and you will always be glad to see each of them. There is no past home - there is a place where you were very happy, and now you are happy to return. Thank you Etihad for the warm welcome!".

Arsenal carved out a ten-point lead in the race for the Premier League but would be thrashed 4–1 by City at the City of Manchester Stadium as Guardiola's team clawed back the advantage. Arsenal would go on to draw 3 and lose 3 of their final 9 games and would eventually finish 2nd to City by five points.

In the first game of the 2023–24 season the two teams met in the 2023 FA Community Shield at Wembley Stadium. Following victory in the 2023 UEFA Champions League final, City headed into the game as treble winners and led 1–0 following a late strike from Cole Palmer, however Leandro Trossard's heavily deflected shot cannoned off Manuel Akanji to equalise in the 11th of 13 minutes of added on time sent the game to a penalty shootout, in which the Gunners would win 4–1. After the game, following the equaliser coming in a prolonged period of added on time Guardiola bemoaned the new controversial stoppage time rules brought in by the Football Association during the summer.

On 8 October 2023, Arsenal ended their 12-game losing streak when Gabriel Martinelli's 86th-minute deflected shot wrong-footed Ederson to give the Gunners a 1–0 win, the club's first in the Premier League since December 2015. Arsenal held City to a 0–0 stalemate at the City of Manchester Stadium on 31 March 2024, the first time Arsenal had taken points away at City of Manchester Stadium since 8 May 2016, a 2–2 draw. This result also ended Manchester City's 58-game home scoring streak, and was City's first 0–0 draw in 75 Premier League games under Guardiola.

In the title run-in, Arsenal and City found themselves in a two-horse race for the title once again amid Liverpool's title bid collapsing due to the Reds dropping points in 5 of their final 8 games. This season, it was far closer with the race going to the final day but City were once more victorious, pipping Arsenal to the title by 2 points.

On 22 September 2024, the teams met for the first time in the 2024–25 season. Erling Haaland scored to give City an early lead at the City of Manchester Stadium, before Riccardo Calafiori scored his first ever goal for Arsenal from outside the box to level the game. Gabriel then headed Arsenal in front before Leandro Trossard was sent off deep into stoppage time in the first half. Arsenal defended deep throughout the second half and were seconds away from securing their first win at the City of Manchester Stadium since 2015, only for John Stones to score a 98th-minute equalizer to salvage a point for City. After the game, Haaland was seen saying "Stay humble." to Mikel Arteta, which lead to an altercation between Gabriel Jesus and Haaland.

On 2 February 2025, Arsenal and City met for their second match-up of the season, with Arsenal subsequently winning the bout 5–1. This included Myles Lewis-Skelly scoring his first senior goal for the Gunners, to put them 3–1 up. On 21 September 2025, both teams met at the Emirates Stadium in the Premier League, the match ended in a 1–1 draw thanks to Gabriel Martinelli's lob over Gianluigi Donnarumma in the 3rd minute of added time. The two met in the 2026 EFL Cup final, with Nico O'Reilly scoring a brace to secure the trophy for City. City won their meeting at the City of Manchester Stadium on 19 April 2026 with a score of 2–1 to put City within three points of the league lead with a game in hand. During the match, an altercation took place between Gabriel Magalhães and Haaland. After defeating Burnley 1–0 away in the following league game, City moved to the top of the table for the first time since mid-August on goals scored. However, a 1–1 draw away to AFC Bournemouth on 19 May 2026 mathematically secured Arsenal their fourth Premier League title, and their first since 2003–04.

== Rivalry between managers ==
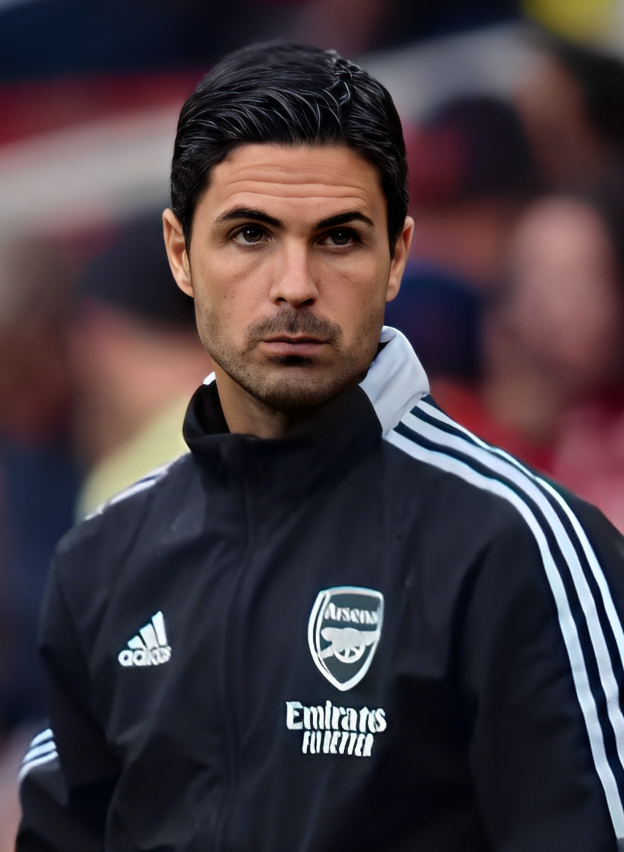
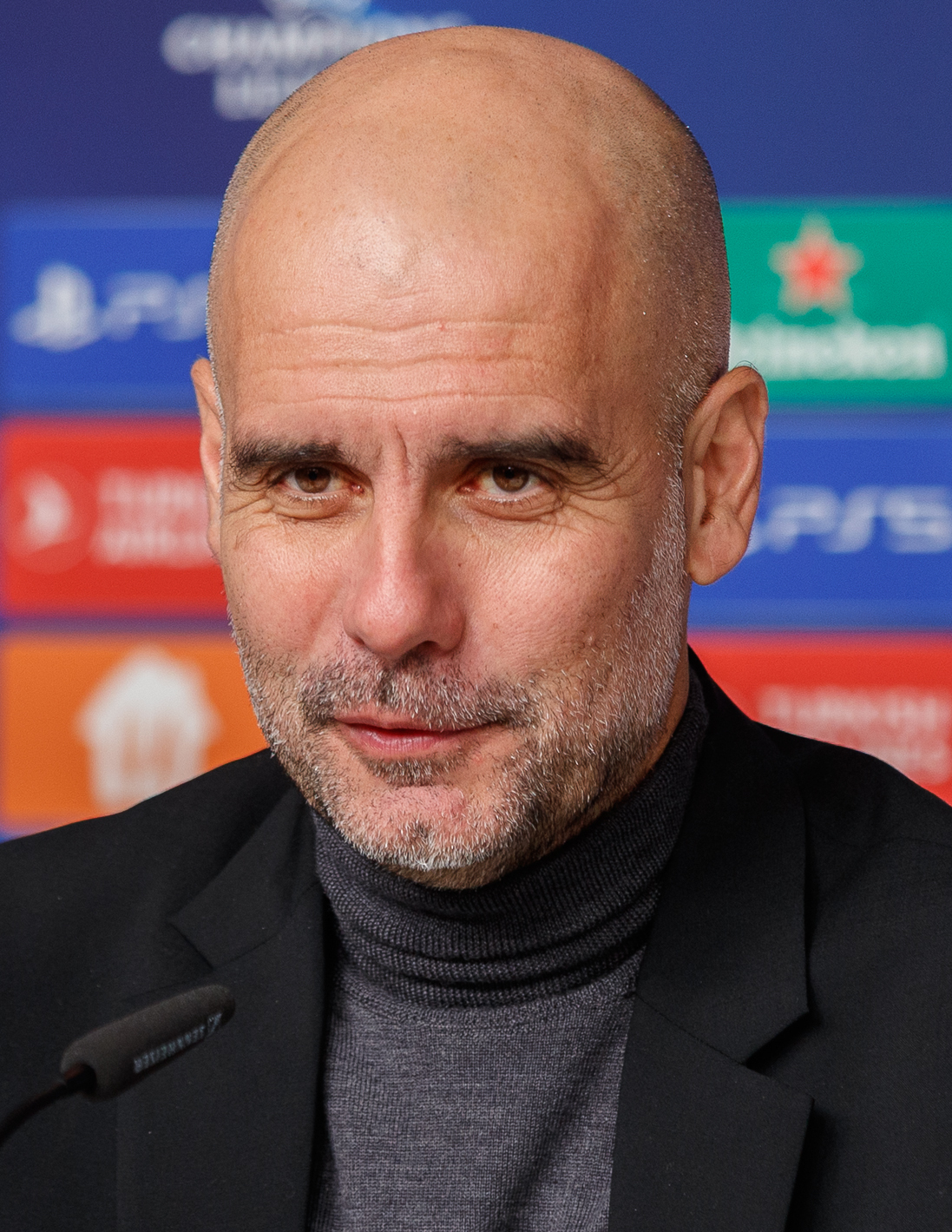
Mikel Arteta and Pep Guardiola, were team mates at FC Barcelona, Arteta was later Pep's Assistant at City before becoming Arsenal manager in 2019.

Pep Guardiola and Mikel Arteta, who are both from Spain, came through the Barcelona academy, and they first met when Arteta was coming through the youth academy whilst Guardiola was an accomplished first team player. Arteta's debut for the Barcelona B team was as a substitute for Guardiola, whose playing career was ultimately winding down due to injuries. Both men are reported to have stayed in touch ever since. Guardiola would go on to manage Barcelona and Bayern Munich before joining City in 2016, whilst Arteta went on to have an established top flight career in the United Kingdom with Rangers, Everton and finally Arsenal where he retired during the same summer of Guardiola's appointment in Manchester.

In the summer of 2016, Guardiola appointed Arteta as one of his assistant coaches to work alongside veteran Brian Kidd. In joining City, he turned down the opportunity to remain at Arsenal as part of Arsène Wenger's coaching staff having been offered the chance to run the clubs academy. He also turned down the opportunity to join Tottenham Hotspur as part of Mauricio Pochettino's staff.

Arteta stood in as City manager in a 2–1 Champions League loss against Lyon on 19 September 2018, because of Guardiola's touchline ban. At City, Arteta won two Premier League titles, an FA Cup, and two EFL Cups. In 2018, Arteta became strongly linked with the Arsenal manager's vacancy, following the departure of his former manager Arsène Wenger, but Unai Emery was eventually hired.

On 20 December 2019, Arteta was appointed head coach at Arsenal, signing a deal until 2023. Upon his appointment, he stated that he believed the club had lost direction and that he didn't want players to shirk responsibility: "I want people to take responsibility for their jobs and I want people who deliver passion and energy in the football club. Anyone who doesn't buy into this, or that has a negative effect or whatever, is not good enough for this environment or this culture."

Both men have since expressed their relationship would not change despite managing rival clubs and both regard one on another as a close friend. During the run in for the title in 2022–23, Arteta stated "I would prefer to do it with someone else, to be fair. I want the best for him, genuinely, and when you are challenging with someone like this and something comes in-between that, it's a strange feeling."

== Honours ==
As of 19 May 2026

- Club holds record in the competition

Arsenal	Competition	Manchester City
Domestic
14	First Division / Premier League	10
14	FA Cup	8
2	League Cup	9
17	FA Community Shield	7
1	Football League Centenary Trophy (defunct)	—
48	Domestic total	34
International
—	UEFA Champions League	1
1	UEFA Cup Winners' Cup (defunct)	1
—	UEFA Super Cup	1
1	Inter-Cities Fairs Cup (defunct)	—
—	FIFA Club World Cup	1
2	International total	4
50	Grand total	38

== Head-to-head ==
As of 19 April 2026

Competition	Played	Arsenal wins	Draws	Manchester City wins	Arsenal goals	Manchester City goals
Premier League	58	25	13	20	83	77
First Division	124	60	32	32	212	146
Second Division	14	4	2	8	13	25
FA Cup	6	4	0	2	7	5
EFL Cup	11	5	1	5	11	17
UEFA Champions League	0	0	0	0	0	0
FA Community Shield	3	2	1	0	8	1
Total	216	100	49	67	334	271

== Matches ==
The table below shows the matches played between Arsenal and Manchester City, separated by home, as in matches played in Arsenal's Manor Ground, Highbury Stadium and now Emirates Stadium are shown in the left hand table and matches played at Manchester City's home stadium (following a nomadic embryonic existence, City resided at Hyde Road from 1887 to 1923, then Maine Road until 2003, and finally the City of Manchester Stadium from the 2003–04 season onwards) are shown on the right. Cup finals are typically played at a neutral location such as the England national football team home stadium (Wembley).

Arsenal at home
Date	Score	Competition
11 November 1893	1–0	League Division Two
29 September 1894	4–2	League Division Two
7 September 1895	0–1	League Division Two
28 April 1897	1–2	League Division Two
5 February 1898	2–2	League Division Two
3 April 1899	0–1	League Division Two
1 November 1902	1–0	League Division Two
20 February 1904	0–2	FA Cup
10 December 1904	1–0	League Division One
2 December 1905	2–0	League Division One
29 December 1906	4–1	League Division One
21 September 1907	2–1	League Division One
10 October 1908	3–0	League Division One
29 October 1910	0–1	League Division One
2 March 1912	2–0	League Division One
2 November 1912	0–4	League Division One
3 January 1920	2–2	League Division One
11 September 1920	2–1	League Division One
17 September 1921	0–1	League Division One
20 January 1923	1–0	League Division One
13 October 1923	1–2	League Division One
1 September 1924	1–0	League Division One
20 March 1926	1–0	League Division One
2 February 1929	0–0	League Division One
11 September 1929	3–2	League Division One
26 December 1930	3–1	League Division One
30 January 1932	4–0	League Division One
12 March 1932	1–0	FA Cup
21 January 1933	2–1	League Division One
9 September 1933	0–0	League Division One
13 October 1934	3–0	League Division One
28 November 1934	4–0	FA Charity Shield
21 September 1935	2–3	League Division One
5 December 1936	1–3	League Division One
2 October 1937	2–1	League Division One
6 December 1947	1–1	League Division One
4 December 1948	1–1	League Division One
1 April 1950	4–1	League Division One
26 January 1952	2–2	League Division One
22 November 1952	3–1	League Division One
19 September 1953	2–2	League Division One
14 September 1954	2–3	League Division One
6 September 1955	0–0	League Division One
6 October 1956	7–3	League Division One
2 November 1957	2–1	League Division One
20 September 1958	4–1	League Division One
12 September 1959	3–1	League Division One
14 January 1961	5–4	League Division One
9 September 1961	3–0	League Division One
20 April 1963	2–3	League Division One
14 January 1967	1–0	FA Cup
23 September 1967	1–0	League Division One
27 August 1968	4–1	League Division One
22 November 1969	1–1	League Division One
6 February 1971	1–0	League Division One
13 November 1971	1–2	League Division One
28 October 1972	0–0	League Division One
23 March 1974	2–0	League Division One
24 August 1974	4–0	League Division One
4 October 1975	2–3	League Division One
4 September 1976	0–0	League Division One
24 January 1978	1–0	League Cup
4 March 1978	3–0	League Division One
24 March 1979	1–1	League Division One
6 October 1979	0–0	League Division One
24 February 1981	2–0	League Division One
17 October 1981	1–0	League Division One
23 April 1983	3–0	League Division One
2 November 1985	1–0	League Division One
28 October 1986	3–1	League Cup
22 November 1986	3–0	League Division One
14 October 1989	4–0	League Division One
17 April 1991	2–2	League Division One
31 August 1991	2–1	League Division One
28 September 1992	1–0	Premier League
16 October 1993	0–0	Premier League
20 August 1994	3–0	Premier League
5 March 1996	3–1	Premier League
28 October 2000	5–0	Premier League
10 September 2002	2–1	Premier League
1 February 2004	2–1	Premier League
4 January 2005	1–1	Premier League
22 October 2005	1–0	Premier League
17 April 2007	3–1	Premier League
25 August 2007	1–0	Premier League
4 April 2009	2–0	Premier League
24 April 2010	0–0	Premier League
5 January 2011	0–0	Premier League
29 November 2011	0–1	League Cup
8 April 2012	1–0	Premier League
13 January 2013	0–2	Premier League
29 March 2014	1–1	Premier League
13 September 2014	2–2	Premier League
21 December 2015	2–1	Premier League
2 April 2017	2–2	Premier League
1 March 2018	0–3	Premier League
12 August 2018	0–2	Premier League
15 December 2019	0–3	Premier League
22 December 2020	1–4	EFL Cup
21 February 2021	0–1	Premier League
1 January 2022	1–2	Premier League
15 February 2023	1–3	Premier League
8 October 2023	1–0	Premier League
2 February 2025	5–1	Premier League
21 September 2025	1–1	Premier League

Manchester City at home
Date	Score	Competition
30 December 1893	0–1	League Division Two
15 December 1894	4–1	League Division Two
28 September 1895	1–0	League Division Two
5 September 1896	1–1	League Division Two
25 September 1897	4–1	League Division Two
1 October 1898	3–1	League Division Two
20 December 1902	4–1	League Division Two
8 April 1905	1–0	League Division One
7 April 1906	1–2	League Division One
1 September 1906	1–4	League Division One
18 January 1908	4–0	League Division One
13 February 1909	2–2	League Division One
4 March 1911	1–1	League Division One
28 October 1911	3–3	League Division One
8 March 1913	0–1	League Division One
17 January 1920	4–1	League Division One
18 September 1920	3–1	League Division One
10 September 1921	2–0	League Division One
27 January 1923	0–0	League Division One
6 October 1923	1–0	League Division One
17 September 1924	2–0	League Division One
7 November 1925	2–5	League Division One
22 September 1928	4–1	League Division One
4 September 1929	3–1	League Division One
25 December 1930	1–4	League Division One
19 September 1931	1–3	League Division One
10 September 1932	2–3	League Division One
20 January 1934	2–1	League Division One
23 February 1935	1–1	League Division One
11 March 1936	1–0	League Division One
10 April 1937	2–0	League Division One
16 February 1938	1–2	League Division One
24 April 1948	0–0	League Division One
27 April 1949	0–3	League Division One
12 November 1949	0–2	League Division One
22 September 1951	0–2	League Division One
11 April 1953	2–4	League Division One
6 February 1954	0–0	League Division One
8 September 1954	2–1	League Division One
31 August 1955	2–2	League Division One
20 March 1957	2–3	League Division One
15 March 1958	2–4	League Division One
7 February 1959	0–0	League Division One
23 January 1960	1–2	League Division One
3 September 1960	0–0	League Division One
20 January 1962	3–2	League Division One
1 December 1962	2–4	League Division One
10 September 1966	1–1	League Division One
3 February 1968	1–1	League Division One
9 October 1968	1–1	League Division One
18 February 1970	1–1	League Division One
5 December 1970	0–2	League Division One
17 February 1971	1–2	FA Cup
4 March 1972	2–0	League Division One
24 March 1973	1–2	League Division One
10 November 1973	1–2	League Division One
16 October 1974	2–1	League Division One
24 April 1976	3–1	League Division One
12 February 1977	1–0	League Division One
8 October 1977	2–1	League Division One
18 January 1978	0–0	League Cup
22 August 1978	1–1	League Division One
15 March 1980	0–3	League Division One
6 September 1980	1–1	League Division One
6 March 1982	0–0	League Division One
4 December 1982	2–1	League Division One
30 October 1985	1–2	League Cup
5 April 1986	0–1	League Division One
25 April 1987	3–0	League Division One
10 March 1990	1–1	League Division One
30 October 1990	1–2	League Cup
1 January 1991	0–1	League Division One
28 December 1991	1–0	League Division One
16 January 1993	0–1	Premier League
15 January 1994	0–0	Premier League
12 December 1994	1–2	Premier League
10 September 1995	0–1	Premier League
11 April 2001	0–4	Premier League
22 February 2003	1–5	Premier League
31 August 2003	1–2	Premier League
25 September 2004	0–1	Premier League
27 October 2004	1–2	League Cup
4 May 2006	1–3	Premier League
26 August 2006	1–0	Premier League
2 February 2008	1–3	Premier League
22 November 2008	3–0	Premier League
12 September 2009	4–2	Premier League
2 December 2009	3–0	League Cup
24 October 2010	0–3	Premier League
18 December 2011	1–0	Premier League
23 September 2012	1–1	Premier League
14 December 2013	6–3	Premier League
18 January 2015	0–2	Premier League
8 May 2016	2–2	Premier League
18 December 2016	2–1	Premier League
5 November 2017	3–1	Premier League
3 February 2019	3–1	Premier League
17 June 2020	3–0	Premier League
17 October 2020	1–0	Premier League
28 August 2021	5–0	Premier League
27 January 2023	1–0	FA Cup
26 April 2023	4–1	Premier League
31 March 2024	0–0	Premier League
22 September 2024	2–2	Premier League
19 April 2026	2–1	Premier League

At neutral venues
Date	Team 1	Score	Team 2	Competition	Venue
10 August 2014	Arsenal	3–0	Manchester City	FA Community Shield	Wembley Stadium
23 April 2017	Arsenal	2–1 (a.e.t.)	Manchester City	FA Cup semi-final	Wembley Stadium
25 February 2018	Arsenal	0–3	Manchester City	EFL Cup final	Wembley Stadium
18 July 2020	Arsenal	2–0	Manchester City	FA Cup semi-final	Wembley Stadium
6 August 2023	Arsenal	1–1 (4–1 p)	Manchester City	FA Community Shield	Wembley Stadium
22 March 2026	Arsenal	0–2	Manchester City	EFL Cup final	Wembley Stadium
16 August 2026	Arsenal		Manchester City	FA Community Shield	Millennium Stadium

== Shared player history ==
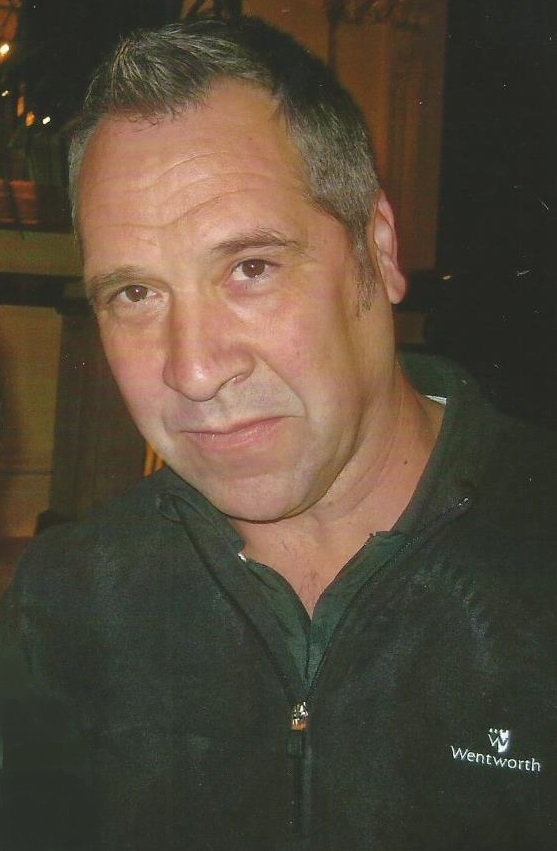
Arsenal legend David Seaman retired a City player during the 2003–04 season.

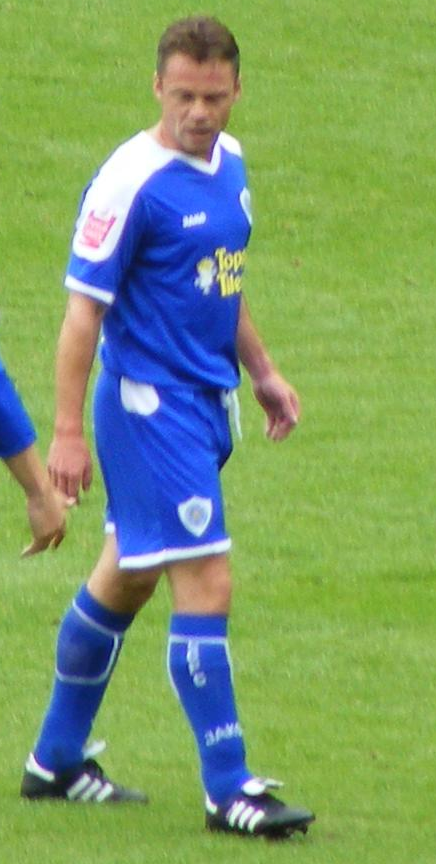
Former Arsenal youngster Paul Dickov scored vital goals for City during their Football League tenure.

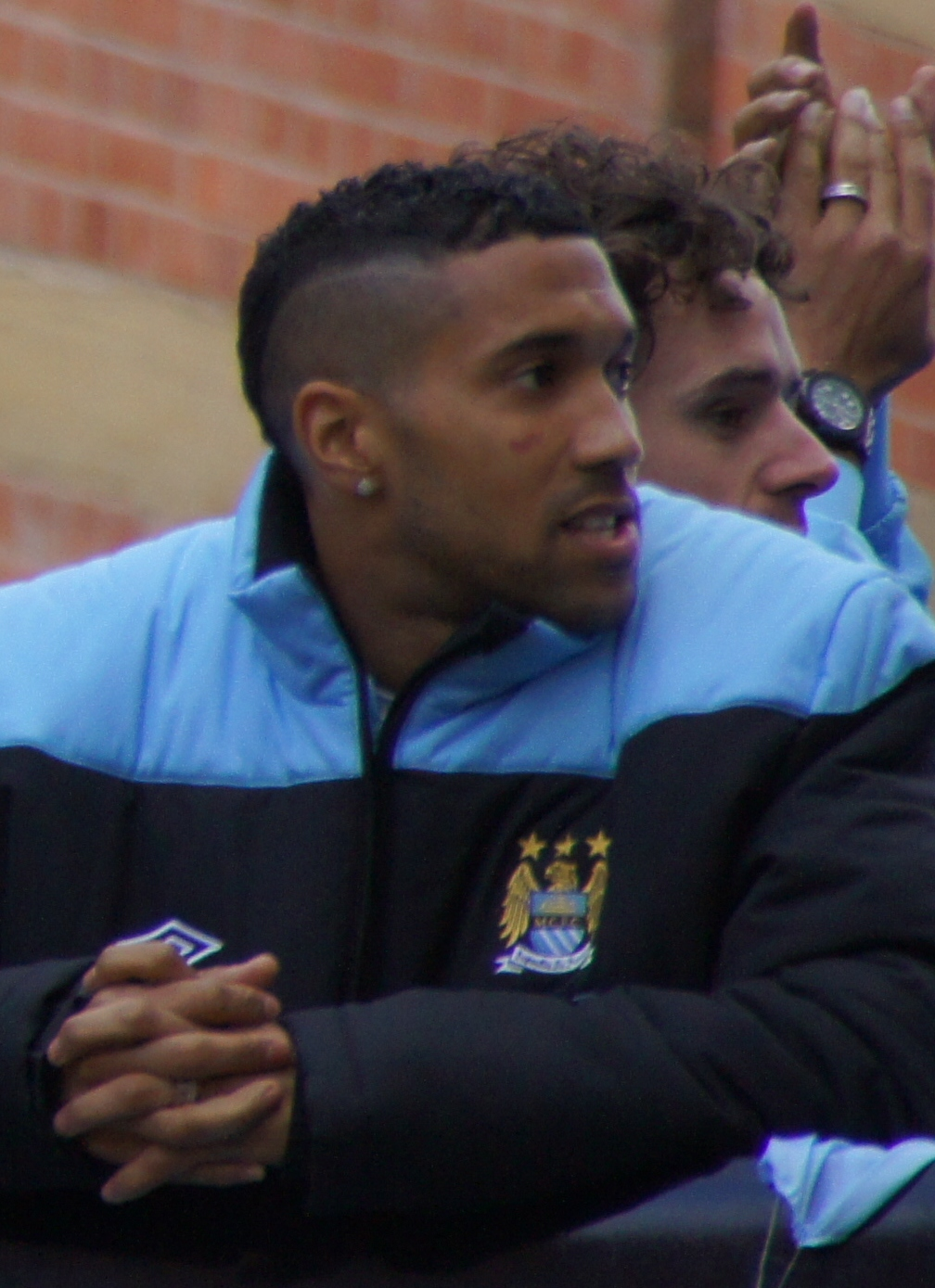
Gael Clichy won the Premier League with both clubs.

As of 2 September 2026

- Players contracted professionally to each team.

Player	Arsenal career			Manchester City career		
Player	Span	League apps	League goals	Span	League apps	League goals
(Scotland) James Blair	1905–1906	13	3	1906–1910	76	0
(Scotland) Billy Blyth	1914–1929	314	45	1913–1914	0	0
(Scotland) Dave Halliday	1929–1932	15	8	1930–1933	76	47
(England) Dave Bacuzzi	1958–1964	46	0	1964–1966	57	0
(England) Brian Kidd	1974–1976	77	30	1976–1979	98	44
(England) Tommy Caton	1983–1987	81	2	1979–1983	165	8
(England) Clive Allen	1980	0	0	1989–1991	53	16
(Republic of Ireland) Niall Quinn	1983–1990	67	14	1990–1996	204	66
(England) David Rocastle	1985–1992	218	24	1993–1994	21	2
(England) Neil Heaney	1989–1994	7	0	1996–1999	18	1
(England) Andy Cole	1989–1992	1	0	2005–2006	22	9
(England) David Seaman	1990–2003	405	0	2003–2004	19	0
(Scotland) Paul Dickov	1990–1996	22	4	1996–2002; 2006–2008	174	35
(Republic of Ireland) Eddie McGoldrick	1993–1996	38	0	1996–1999	39	0
(France) Patrick Vieira	1996–2004	279	29	2010–2011	28	3
(France) Nicolas Anelka	1997–1999	65	23	2002–2005	89	37
(Brazil) Sylvinho	1999–2001	59	1	2009–2010	10	0
(England) Stuart Taylor	1999–2004	18	0	2009–2012	0	0
(Ivory Coast) Kolo Touré	2001–2009	225	9	2009–2013	82	2
(England) Richard Wright	2001–2002	12	0	2012–2016	0	0
(France) Gaël Clichy	2003–2011	187	1	2011–2017	138	2
(Togo) Emmanuel Adebayor	2006–2009	104	46	2009–2012	34	15
(France) Bacary Sagna	2007–2014	213	4	2014–2017	54	0
(France) Samir Nasri	2008–2011	86	18	2011–2017	129	18
(Spain) Denis Suárez	2019	4	0	2011–2013	0	0
(Spain) Pablo Marí	2020–2023	12	0	2016–2019	0	0
(Ukraine) Oleksandr Zinchenko	2022–2026	69	2	2017–2022	76	0
(Brazil) Gabriel Jesus	2022–2026	84	21	2017–2022	159	58
(England) Raheem Sterling	2024–2025	17	0	2015–2022	225	91

=== Played for one, managed the other ===
*italics denote caretaker or stand-in manager.

Manager	Played for				Managed						
Manager	Team	Span	League apps	League goals	Team	Span	G	W	D	L	Win %
(England) Joe Mercer	Arsenal	1946–1955	247	2	Manchester City	1965–1971	340	149	94	97	43.82
(England) Alan Ball Jr.	Arsenal	1966–1971	177	45	Manchester City	1995–1996	49	13	14	22	26.53
(England) Brian Kidd	Arsenal	1974–1976	77	30	Manchester City	2013	2	1	0	1	50
(Spain) Mikel Arteta	Arsenal	2011–2016	110	14	Manchester City	2018	1	0	0	1	0

== See also ==
- List of association football club rivalries in Europe
