= List of EFL Cup finals =

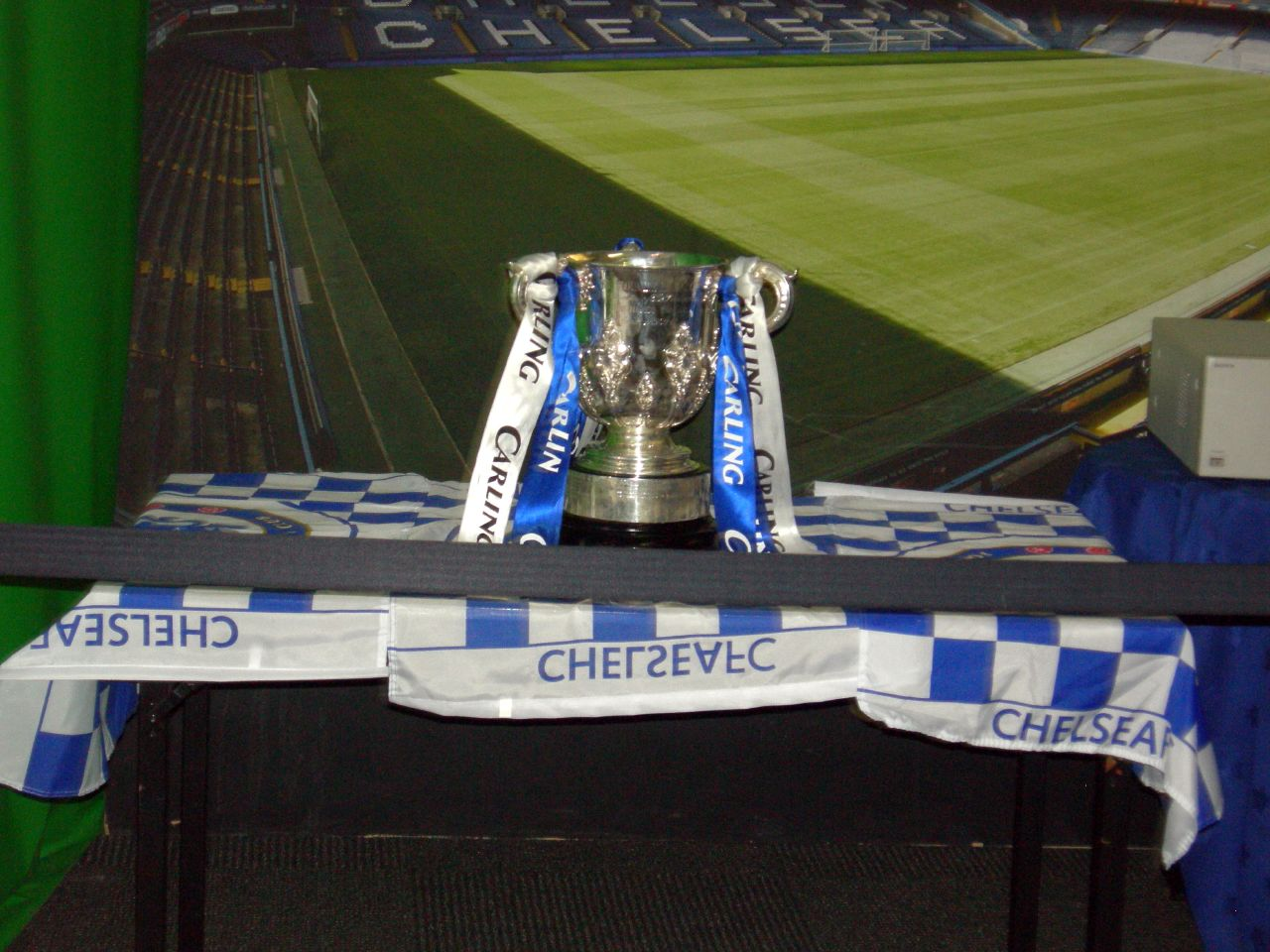
The winner of the final receives the eponymous EFL Cup.

The EFL Cup is a knockout cup competition in English football organised by and named after the English Football League (EFL). The competition was established in 1960 and is considered to be the second-most important domestic cup competition for English football clubs, after the FA Cup. The competition is open to all 72 members of the English Football League and the 20 members of the Premier League. For the first six seasons of the competition, the final was contested over two legs, one at each participating club's stadium. The first Football League Cup was won by Aston Villa, who beat Rotherham United 3–2 on aggregate, after losing the first leg 2–0. The competition's first single-legged final was held in 1967: Queens Park Rangers defeated West Bromwich Albion 3–2 at Wembley Stadium in London.

As of 2026, 24 clubs have won the EFL Cup. Liverpool hold the record for the most EFL Cup titles, with ten victories in the competition. Liverpool's wins include four consecutive titles from 1981 to 1984, while Manchester City's, who have won nine times, include four consecutive titles from 2018 to 2021. Nottingham Forest and Manchester United are the only other clubs to have won consecutive titles. Forest won two consecutive titles twice – in 1978 and 1979, and 1989 and 1990, while United won consecutive editions in 2009 and 2010. Arsenal have been runners-up more than any other club; they have lost the final seven times. The current holders are Manchester City, who beat Arsenal 2–0 in the 2026 final to win their ninth League Cup.

== History ==
The first winners of the tournament were Aston Villa. The final was contested over two legs for the first six years of the competition. During this period many First Division clubs refused to take part, allowing clubs from outside the First Division to regularly reach the final. The first club from outside the First Division to win the competition was Norwich City of the Second Division in 1962. Queen's Park Rangers and Swindon Town, both then of Division Three, matched this feat in 1967 and 1969 respectively. Sheffield Wednesday, then in the Second Division, became the last club to win the competition while competing outside the First Division, when they beat Manchester United in the 1991 final.

In the late 1960s, the winners of the competition were granted automatic qualification to the UEFA Cup. With the promise of potential European football, First Division clubs entered the competition, and all 92 Football League clubs entered the League Cup for the first time in 1969–70. Meanwhile, the final of the competition had also been altered; it would now be played over a single leg at Wembley Stadium. The final went to a replay for the first time in 1977, with Aston Villa requiring two replays to overcome Everton; the first was held at Hillsborough Stadium in Sheffield, and the second at Old Trafford in Manchester.

The following year, Nottingham Forest won the first of two consecutive titles, the first time that any club won back-to-back League Cup titles. The first took a replay at Old Trafford to beat Liverpool, and they beat Southampton 3–2 to win the second. Liverpool won four consecutive titles between 1981 and 1984, a record equalled by Manchester City in 2021. Nottingham Forest won two more consecutive titles in 1989 and 1990.

The last League Cup final replay was held in 1997; Leicester City beat Middlesbrough 1–0 after extra time at Hillsborough, after the two clubs had played out a 1–1 draw at Wembley. The rules were changed afterwards with a penalty shoot-out incorporated instead of replays. The first single-match final to be played outside London was held in 2001, as the final was moved to Cardiff's Millennium Stadium while the new Wembley Stadium was under construction. Liverpool and Chelsea were the two most prolific League Cup sides in Cardiff, as both clubs won two titles each. The final returned to London in 2008, where Tottenham Hotspur became the first side to win the competition at the new Wembley, beating Chelsea 2–1 after extra time.

== Finals ==
Key to the list of finals
†	Match was won during extra time
‡	Match was won on a penalty shoot-out
&	Match was won after a replay
$	Match was won after a replay in extra time
£	Match was won after two replays in extra time
§	Winning team won the Domestic Treble (League title, FA Cup and League Cup)
Italics	Club from outside the top-tier of English football
(#)	Number of trophy win of club

All teams are English, except where marked (Wales) (Welsh).

EFL Cup winners
Final	Winners	Score	Runners-up	Venue	Attendance
1961	Aston Villa (1)	0–2	Rotherham United	Millmoor	12,226
1961	Aston Villa (1)	3–0^{†}	Rotherham United	Villa Park	31,202
1961	Aston Villa won 3–2 on aggregate				
1962	Norwich City (1)	3–0	Rochdale	Spotland	11,123
1962	Norwich City (1)	1–0	Rochdale	Carrow Road	19,708
1962	Norwich City won 4–0 on aggregate				
1963	Birmingham City (1)	3–1	Aston Villa	St Andrew's	31,850
1963	Birmingham City (1)	0–0	Aston Villa	Villa Park	37,921
1963	Birmingham City won 3–1 on aggregate				
1964	Leicester City (1)	1–1	Stoke City	Victoria Ground	22,309
1964	Leicester City (1)	3–2	Stoke City	Filbert Street	25,372
1964	Leicester City won 4–3 on aggregate				
1965	Chelsea (1)	3–2	Leicester City	Stamford Bridge	20,690
1965	Chelsea (1)	0–0	Leicester City	Filbert Street	26,958
1965	Chelsea won 3–2 on aggregate				
1966	West Bromwich Albion (1)	1–2	West Ham United	Boleyn Ground	28,341
1966	West Bromwich Albion (1)	4–1	West Ham United	The Hawthorns	31,925
1966	West Bromwich Albion won 5–3 on aggregate				
1967	Queens Park Rangers (1)	3–2	West Bromwich Albion	Wembley Stadium	97,952
1968	Leeds United (1)	1–0	Arsenal	Wembley Stadium	97,887
1969	Swindon Town (1)	3–1^{†}	Arsenal	Wembley Stadium	98,189
1970	Manchester City (1)	2–1^{†}	West Bromwich Albion	Wembley Stadium	97,963
1971	Tottenham Hotspur (1)	2–0	Aston Villa	Wembley Stadium	100,000
1972	Stoke City (1)	2–1	Chelsea	Wembley Stadium	97,852
1973	Tottenham Hotspur (2)	1–0	Norwich City	Wembley Stadium	100,000
1974	Wolverhampton Wanderers (1)	2–1	Manchester City	Wembley Stadium	97,886
1975	Aston Villa (2)	1–0	Norwich City	Wembley Stadium	95,946
1976	Manchester City (2)	2–1	Newcastle United	Wembley Stadium	100,000
1977	Aston Villa (3)	0–0	Everton	Wembley Stadium	100,000
1977	Aston Villa (3)	1–1	Everton	Hillsborough Stadium	55,000
1977	Aston Villa (3)	3–2^{£}	Everton	Old Trafford	54,749
1978	Nottingham Forest (1)	0–0	Liverpool	Wembley Stadium	100,000
1978	Nottingham Forest (1)	1–0^{&}	Liverpool	Old Trafford	54,375
1979	Nottingham Forest (2)	3–2	Southampton	Wembley Stadium	96,952
1980	Wolverhampton Wanderers (2)	1–0	Nottingham Forest	Wembley Stadium	96,527
1981	Liverpool (1)	1–1	West Ham United	Wembley Stadium	100,000
1981	Liverpool (1)	2–1^{&}	West Ham United	Villa Park	36,693
1982	Liverpool (2)	3–1^{†}	Tottenham Hotspur	Wembley Stadium	100,000
1983	Liverpool (3)	2–1^{†}	Manchester United	Wembley Stadium	99,304
1984	Liverpool (4)	0–0	Everton	Wembley Stadium	100,000
1984	Liverpool (4)	1–0^{&}	Everton	Maine Road	52,089
1985	Norwich City (2)	1–0	Sunderland	Wembley Stadium	100,000
1986	Oxford United (1)	3–0	Queens Park Rangers	Wembley Stadium	90,396
1987	Arsenal (1)	2–1	Liverpool	Wembley Stadium	96,000
1988	Luton Town (1)	3–2	Arsenal	Wembley Stadium	95,732
1989	Nottingham Forest (3)	3–1	Luton Town	Wembley Stadium	76,130
1990	Nottingham Forest (4)	1–0	Oldham Athletic	Wembley Stadium	74,343
1991	Sheffield Wednesday (1)	1–0	Manchester United	Wembley Stadium	77,612
1992	Manchester United (1)	1–0	Nottingham Forest	Wembley Stadium	76,810
1993	Arsenal (2)	2–1	Sheffield Wednesday	Wembley Stadium	74,007
1994	Aston Villa (4)	3–1	Manchester United	Wembley Stadium	77,231
1995	Liverpool (5)	2–1	Bolton Wanderers	Wembley Stadium	75,595
1996	Aston Villa (5)	3–0	Leeds United	Wembley Stadium	77,065
1997	Leicester City (2)	1–1	Middlesbrough	Wembley Stadium	76,757
1997	Leicester City (2)	1–0^{$}	Middlesbrough	Hillsborough Stadium	39,428
1998	Chelsea (2)	2–0^{†}	Middlesbrough	Wembley Stadium	77,698
1999	Tottenham Hotspur (3)	1–0	Leicester City	Wembley Stadium	77,892
2000	Leicester City (3)	2–1	Tranmere Rovers	Wembley Stadium	74,313
2001	Liverpool (6)	1–1^{‡} (Note: Liverpool won the 2001 final 5–4 in the penalty shoot-out.)	Birmingham City	Millennium Stadium	73,500
2002	Blackburn Rovers (1)	2–1	Tottenham Hotspur	Millennium Stadium	72,500
2003	Liverpool (7)	2–0	Manchester United	Millennium Stadium	74,500
2004	Middlesbrough (1)	2–1	Bolton Wanderers	Millennium Stadium	72,634
2005	Chelsea (3)	3–2^{†}	Liverpool	Millennium Stadium	78,000
2006	Manchester United (2)	4–0	Wigan Athletic	Millennium Stadium	66,866
2007	Chelsea (4)	2–1	Arsenal	Millennium Stadium	70,073
2008	Tottenham Hotspur (4)	2–1^{†}	Chelsea	Wembley Stadium	87,660
2009	Manchester United (3)	0–0^{‡} (Note: Manchester United won the 2009 final 4–1 in the penalty shoot-out.)	Tottenham Hotspur	Wembley Stadium	88,217
2010	Manchester United (4)	2–1	Aston Villa	Wembley Stadium	88,596
2011	Birmingham City (2)	2–1	Arsenal	Wembley Stadium	88,851
2012	Liverpool (8)	2–2^{‡} (Note: Liverpool won the 2012 final 3–2 in the penalty shoot-out.)	(Wales) Cardiff City	Wembley Stadium	89,041
2013	(Wales) Swansea City (1)	5–0	Bradford City	Wembley Stadium	82,597
2014	Manchester City (3)	3–1	Sunderland	Wembley Stadium	84,697
2015	Chelsea (5)	2–0	Tottenham Hotspur	Wembley Stadium	89,294
2016	Manchester City (4)	1–1^{‡} (Note: Manchester City won the 2016 final 3–1 in the penalty shoot-out.)	Liverpool	Wembley Stadium	86,206
2017	Manchester United (5)	3–2	Southampton	Wembley Stadium	85,264
2018	Manchester City (5)	3–0	Arsenal	Wembley Stadium	85,671
2019	Manchester City § (6)	0–0^{‡} (Note: Manchester City won the 2019 final 4–3 in the penalty shoot-out.)	Chelsea	Wembley Stadium	81,775
2020	Manchester City (7)	2–1	Aston Villa	Wembley Stadium	82,145
2021	Manchester City (8)	1–0	Tottenham Hotspur	Wembley Stadium	7,773 (Note: The total number of fans allowed to attend the final was established at 8,000 due to the COVID-19 pandemic in the United Kingdom.)
2022	Liverpool (9)	0–0^{‡} (Note: Liverpool won the 2022 final 11–10 in the penalty shoot-out.)	Chelsea	Wembley Stadium	85,512
2023	Manchester United (6)	2–0	Newcastle United	Wembley Stadium	87,306
2024	Liverpool (10)	1–0^{†}	Chelsea	Wembley Stadium	88,868
2025	Newcastle United (1)	2–1	Liverpool	Wembley Stadium	88,513
2026	Manchester City (9)	2–0	Arsenal	Wembley Stadium	88,486

== Results by club ==
EFL Cup winners by club
Club	Winners	Years won	Runners-up	Years runner-up
Liverpool	10	1981, 1982, 1983, 1984, 1995, 2001, 2003, 2012, 2022, 2024	5	1978, 1987, 2005, 2016, 2025
Manchester City	9	1970, 1976, 2014, 2016, 2018, 2019, 2020, 2021, 2026	1	1974
Manchester United	6	1992, 2006, 2009, 2010, 2017, 2023	4	1983, 1991, 1994, 2003
Chelsea	5	1965, 1998, 2005, 2007, 2015	5	1972, 2008, 2019, 2022, 2024
Aston Villa	5	1961, 1975, 1977, 1994, 1996	4	1963, 1971, 2010, 2020
Tottenham Hotspur	4	1971, 1973, 1999, 2008	5	1982, 2002, 2009, 2015, 2021
Nottingham Forest	4	1978, 1979, 1989, 1990	2	1980, 1992
Leicester City	3	1964, 1997, 2000	2	1965, 1999
Arsenal	2	1987, 1993	7	1968, 1969, 1988, 2007, 2011, 2018, 2026
Norwich City	2	1962, 1985	2	1973, 1975
Birmingham City	2	1963, 2011	1	2001
Wolverhampton Wanderers	2	1974, 1980	0	—
West Bromwich Albion	1	1966	2	1967, 1970
Middlesbrough	1	2004	2	1997, 1998
Newcastle United	1	2025	2	1976, 2023
Queens Park Rangers	1	1967	1	1986
Leeds United	1	1968	1	1996
Stoke City	1	1972	1	1964
Luton Town	1	1988	1	1989
Sheffield Wednesday	1	1991	1	1993
Swindon Town	1	1969	0	—
Oxford United	1	1986	0	—
Blackburn Rovers	1	2002	0	—
(Wales) Swansea City	1	2013	0	—
West Ham United	0	—	2	1966, 1981
Everton	0	—	2	1977, 1984
Bolton Wanderers	0	—	2	1995, 2004
Sunderland	0	—	2	1985, 2014
Southampton	0	—	2	1979, 2017
Rotherham United	0	—	1	1961
Rochdale	0	—	1	1962
Oldham Athletic	0	—	1	1990
Tranmere Rovers	0	—	1	2000
Wigan Athletic	0	—	1	2006
(Wales) Cardiff City	0	—	1	2012
Bradford City	0	—	1	2013

== Top goalscorers ==
All players with two or more final goals:

Rank	Player	Nat.	Club(s)	Finals scored in	Goals	Ref.
1	Didier Drogba	(Ivory Coast)	Chelsea	2005, 2007, 2008	4	
2	Clive Clark	(England)	West Bromwich Albion	1966, 1967	3	
2	Ronnie Whelan	(Republic of Ireland)	Liverpool	1982, 1983	3	
2	Wayne Rooney	(England)	Manchester United	2006, 2010	3	
5	Derrick Lythgoe	(England)	Norwich City	1962	2	
5	Ken Leek	(Wales)	Birmingham City	1963	2	
5	Dave Gibson	(Scotland)	Leicester City	1964	2	
5	Don Rogers	(England)	Swindon Town	1969	2	
5	Jeff Astle	(England)	West Bromwich Albion	1966, 1970	2	
5	Martin Chivers	(England)	Tottenham Hotspur	1971	2	
5	Bob Latchford	(England)	Everton	1977	2	
5	Brian Little	(England)	Aston Villa	1977	2	
5	Garry Birtles	(England)	Nottingham Forest	1979	2	
5	Alan Kennedy	(England)	Liverpool	1981, 1983	2	
5	Charlie Nicholas	(Scotland)	Arsenal	1987	2	
5	Ian Rush	(Wales)	Liverpool	1982, 1987	2	
5	Brian Stein	(England)	Luton Town	1988	2	
5	Nigel Clough	(England)	Nottingham Forest	1989	2	
5	Dean Saunders	(Wales)	Aston Villa	1994	2	
5	Steve McManaman	(England)	Liverpool	1995	2	
5	Matt Elliott	(Scotland)	Leicester City	2000	2	
5	Michael Owen	(England)	Liverpool, Manchester United	2003, 2010	2	
5	Jonathan de Guzmán	(Netherlands)	Swansea City	2013	2	
5	Nathan Dyer	(England)	Swansea City	2013	2	
5	Manolo Gabbiadini	(Italy)	Southampton	2017	2	
5	Zlatan Ibrahimović	(Sweden)	Manchester United	2017	2	
5	Sergio Agüero	(Argentina)	Manchester City	2018, 2020	2	
5	Nico O'Reilly	(England)	Manchester City	2026	2	
