= Alan Hardaker Trophy =

English association football award

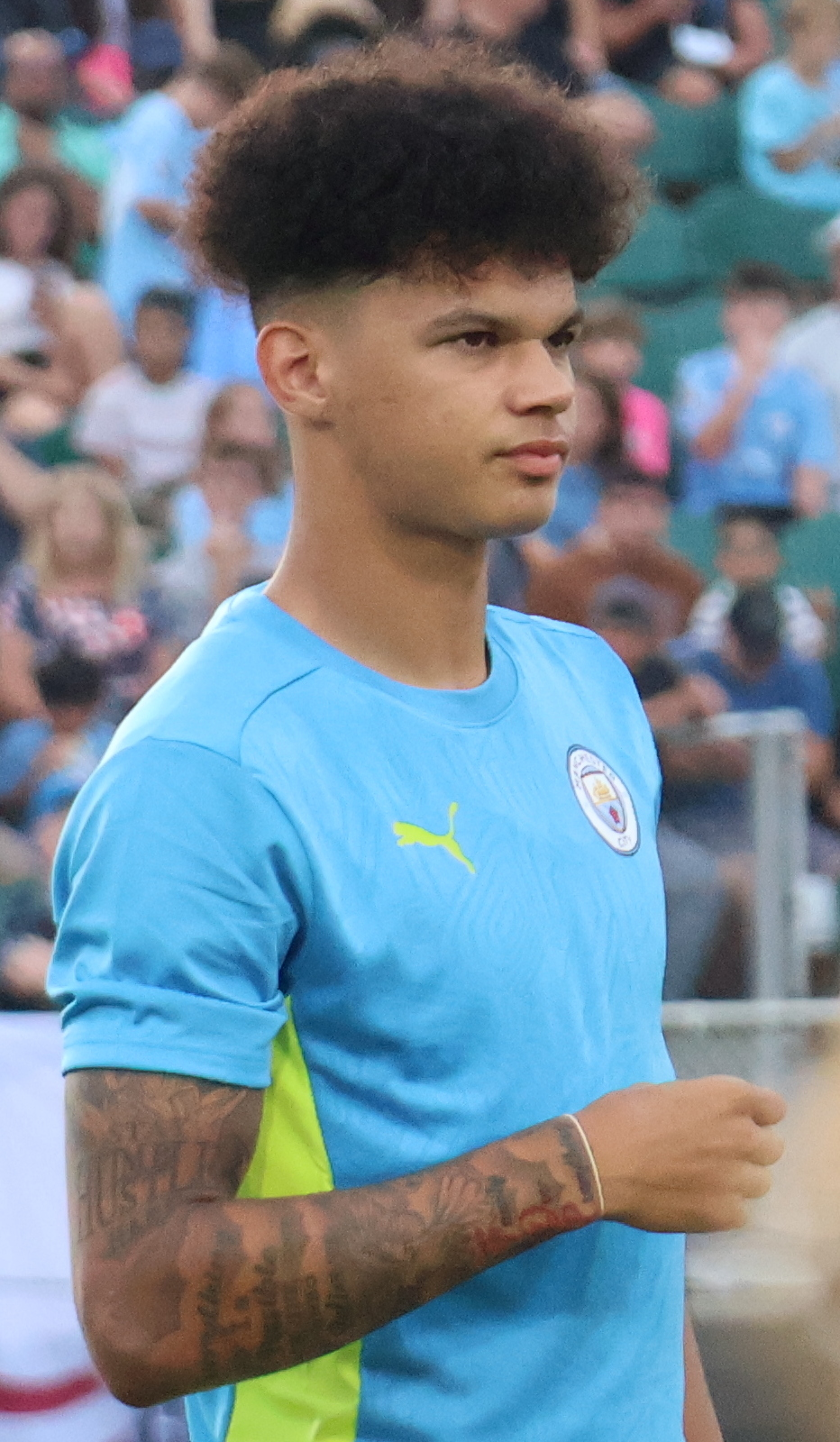
Nico O'Reilly is the current holder of the award.

The Alan Hardaker Trophy is an annual association football award presented to the Man of the Match in the EFL Cup final (also currently known as the Carabao Cup). The trophy is named after Alan Hardaker, the EFL's former secretary who conceived the League Cup.

The Alan Hardaker Trophy was first awarded in 1990, Des Walker was the inaugural recipient. Ben Foster, John Terry, Vincent Kompany and Virgil van Dijk have won the award on two occasions, the most wins by an individual. Ben Foster is the only player to have won the award with 2 different clubs; Manchester United and Birmingham City respectively. Manchester City have received the award seven times, more than any other club. English players have won the trophy nineteen times, which is a record; the only other nations with multiple wins are: the Netherlands with three recipients, and Scotland and Belgium with two recipients each. Every Alan Hardaker Trophy winner has been on the winning team in the final.

== Winners ==
Two-time winners

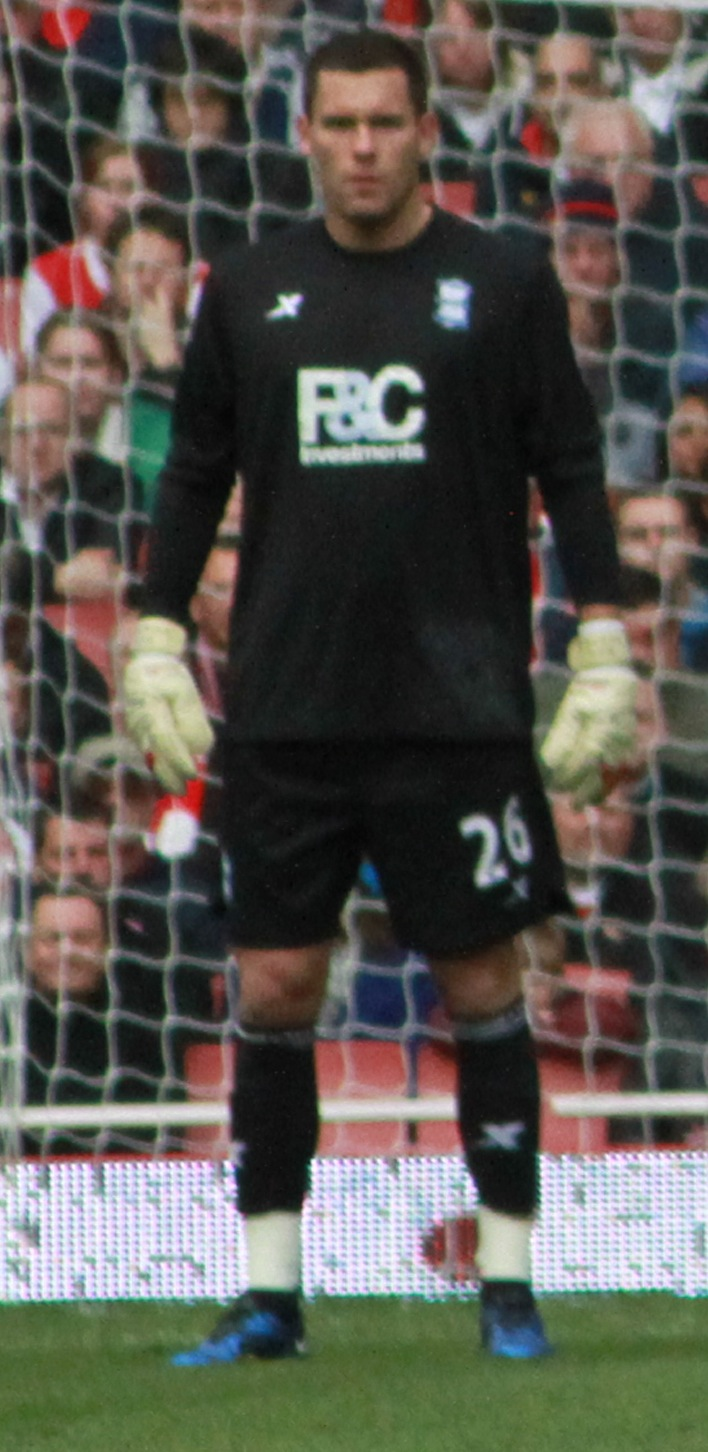
Ben Foster

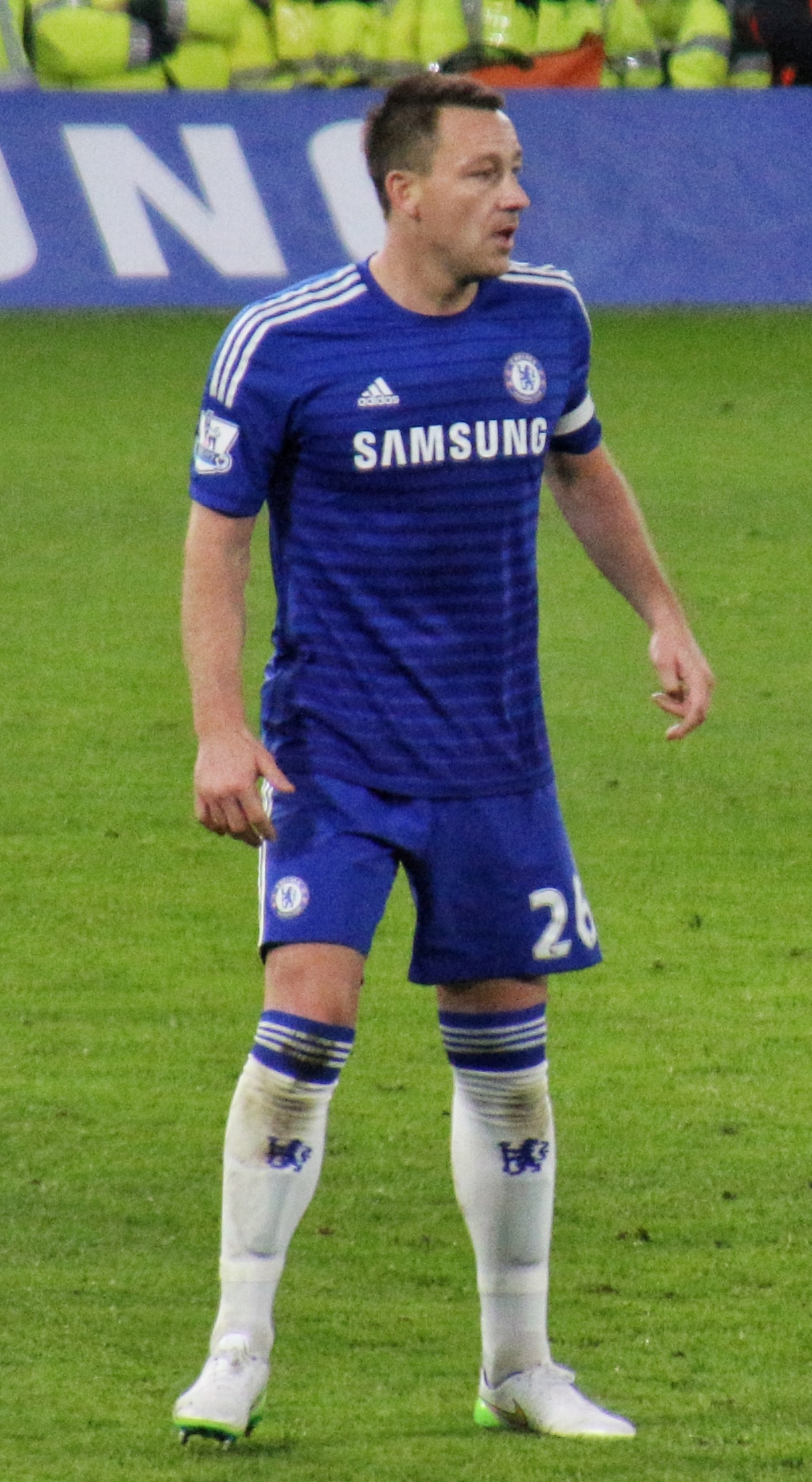
John Terry

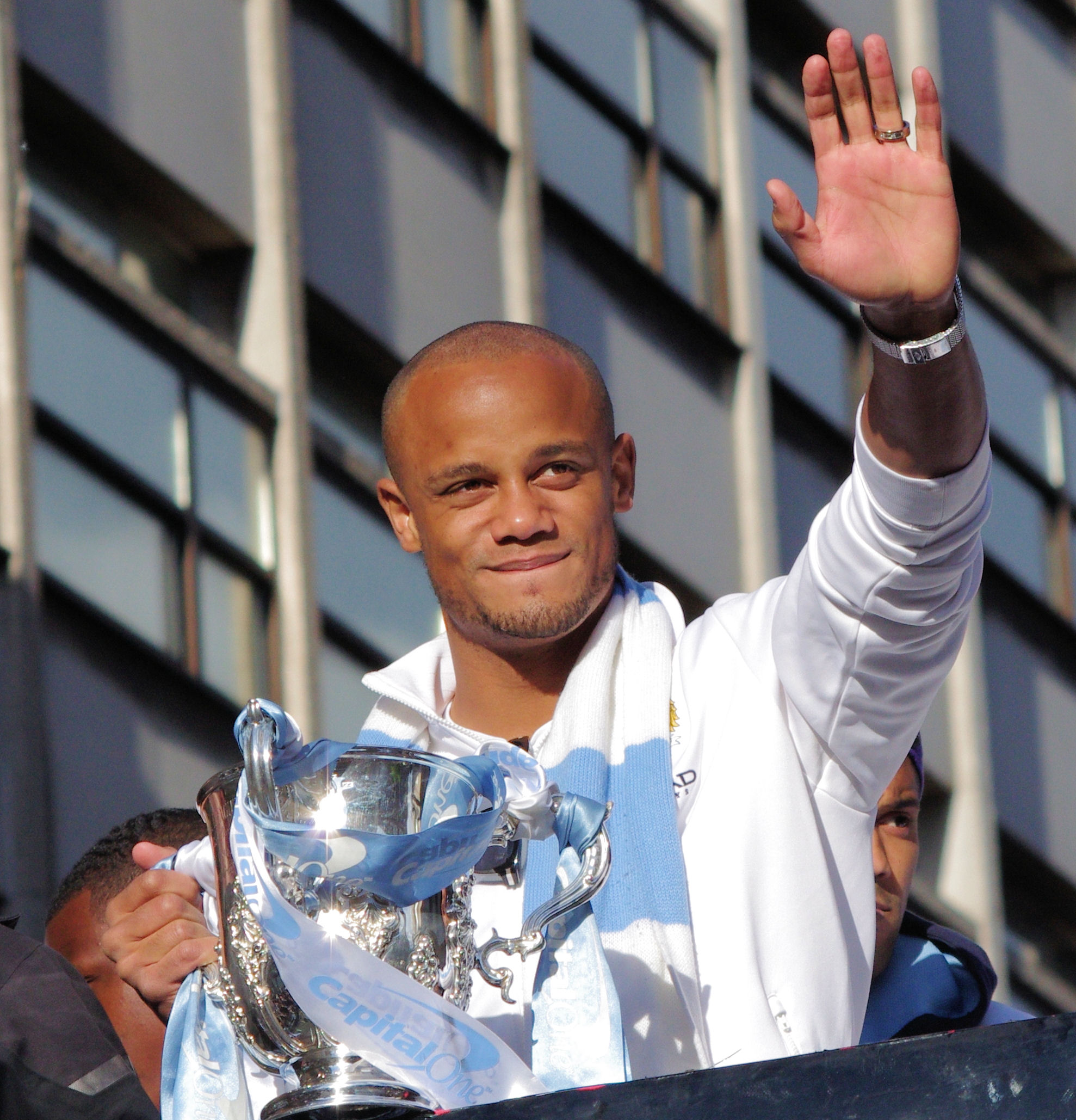
Vincent Kompany

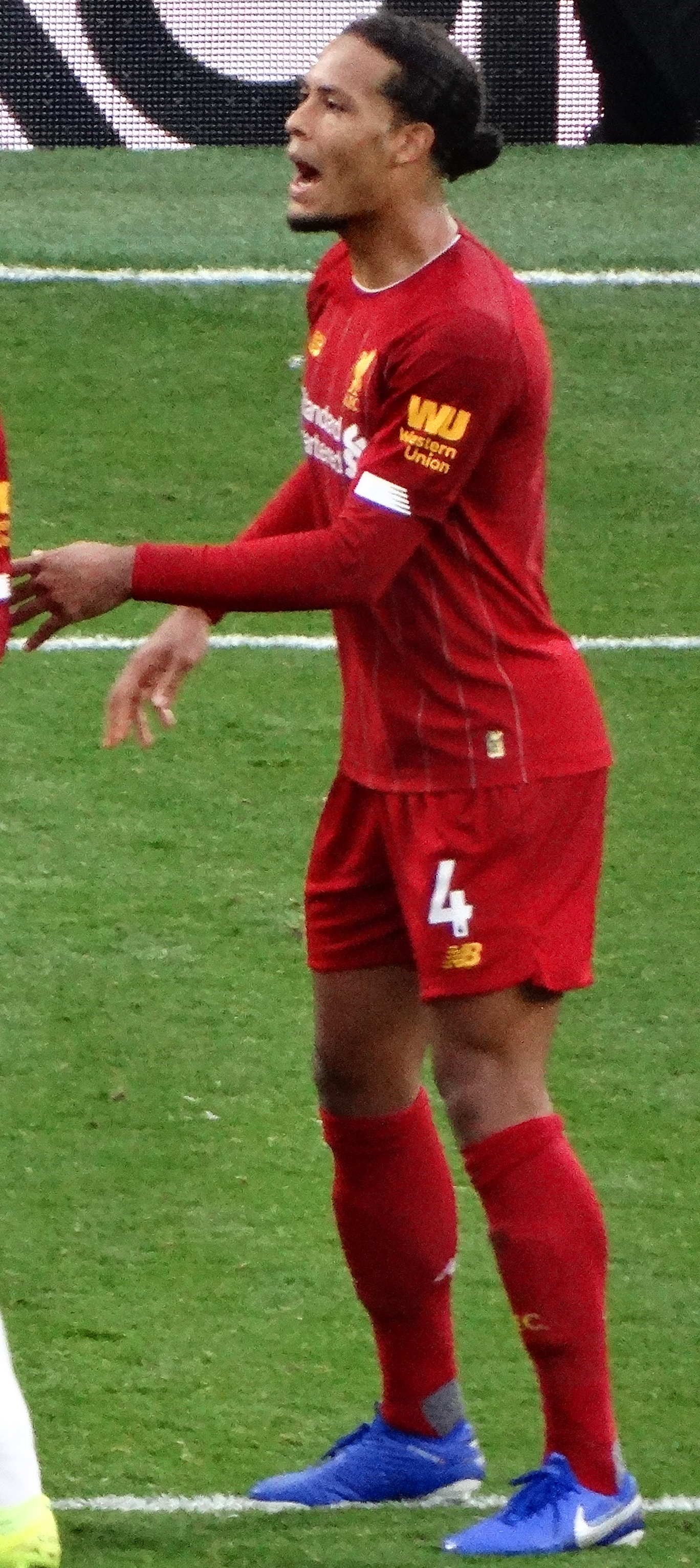
Virgil van Dijk

Key to score column
† – Indicates the match was decided by a replay
* – Indicates the match went to penalty shoot-out

Alan Hardaker Trophy winners
Final	Player	Nationality	Team	Opponents	Score
1990	Des Walker	England	Nottingham Forest	Oldham Athletic	1–0
1991	Nigel Pearson	England	Sheffield Wednesday	Manchester United	1–0
1992	Brian McClair	Scotland	Manchester United	Nottingham Forest	1–0
1993	Paul Merson	England	Arsenal	Sheffield Wednesday	2–1
1994	Kevin Richardson	England	Aston Villa	Manchester United	3–1
1995	Steve McManaman	England	Liverpool	Bolton Wanderers	2–1
1996	Andy Townsend	Ireland	Aston Villa	Leeds United	3–0
1997	Steve Walsh	England	Leicester City	Middlesbrough	1–1 †
1998	Dennis Wise	England	Chelsea	Middlesbrough	2–0
1999	Allan Nielsen	Denmark	Tottenham Hotspur	Leicester City	1–0
2000	Matt Elliott	Scotland	Leicester City	Tranmere Rovers	2–1
2001	Robbie Fowler	England	Liverpool	Birmingham City	1–1 *
2002	Brad Friedel	United States	Blackburn Rovers	Tottenham Hotspur	2–1
2003	Jerzy Dudek	Poland	Liverpool	Manchester United	2–0
2004	Boudewijn Zenden	Netherlands	Middlesbrough	Bolton Wanderers	2–1
2005	John Terry	England	Chelsea	Liverpool	3–2
2006	Wayne Rooney	England	Manchester United	Wigan Athletic	4–0
2007	Didier Drogba	Ivory Coast	Chelsea	Arsenal	2–1
2008	Jonathan Woodgate	England	Tottenham Hotspur	Chelsea	2–1
2009	Ben Foster	England	Manchester United	Tottenham Hotspur	0–0 *
2010	Antonio Valencia	Ecuador	Manchester United	Aston Villa	2–1
2011	Ben Foster (2)	England	Birmingham City	Arsenal	2–1
2012	Stewart Downing	England	Liverpool	Cardiff City	2–2 *
2013	Nathan Dyer	England	Swansea City	Bradford City	5–0
2014	Samir Nasri	France	Manchester City	Sunderland	3–1
2015	John Terry (2)	England	Chelsea	Tottenham Hotspur	2–0
2016	Vincent Kompany	Belgium	Manchester City	Liverpool	1–1 *
2017	Zlatan Ibrahimović	Sweden	Manchester United	Southampton	3–2
2018	Vincent Kompany (2)	Belgium	Manchester City	Arsenal	3–0
2019	Bernardo Silva	Portugal	Manchester City	Chelsea	0–0 *
2020	Phil Foden	England	Manchester City	Aston Villa	2–1
2021	Riyad Mahrez	Algeria	Manchester City	Tottenham Hotspur	1–0
2022	Virgil van Dijk	Netherlands	Liverpool	Chelsea	0–0 *
2023	Casemiro	Brazil	Manchester United	Newcastle United	2–0
2024	Virgil van Dijk (2)	Netherlands	Liverpool	Chelsea	1–0
2025	Dan Burn	England	Newcastle United	Liverpool	2–1
2026	Nico O'Reilly	England	Manchester City	Arsenal	2–0

== Awards won by nationality ==
Country	Win(s)	Year(s)
England	19	1990, 1991, 1993, 1994, 1995, 1997, 1998, 2001, 2005, 2006, 2008, 2009, 2011, 2012, 2013, 2015, 2020, 2025, 2026
Netherlands	3	2004, 2022, 2024
Scotland	2	1992, 2000
Belgium	2	2016, 2018
Ireland	1	1996
Denmark	1	1999
United States	1	2002
Poland	1	2003
Ivory Coast	1	2007
Ecuador	1	2010
France	1	2014
Sweden	1	2017
Portugal	1	2019
Algeria	1	2021
Brazil	1	2023

== Awards won by club ==
Club	Win(s)	Year(s)
Manchester City	7	2014, 2016, 2018, 2019, 2020, 2021, 2026
Manchester United	6	1992, 2006, 2009, 2010, 2017, 2023
Liverpool	6	1995, 2001, 2003, 2012, 2022, 2024
Chelsea	4	1998, 2005, 2007, 2015
Aston Villa	2	1994, 1996
Leicester City	2	1997, 2000
Tottenham Hotspur	2	1999, 2008
Nottingham Forest	1	1990
Sheffield Wednesday	1	1991
Arsenal	1	1993
Blackburn Rovers	1	2002
Middlesbrough	1	2004
Birmingham City	1	2011
Swansea City	1	2013
Newcastle United	1	2025
