= 2026 EFL Cup final =

Final of the 2025–26 EFL Cup

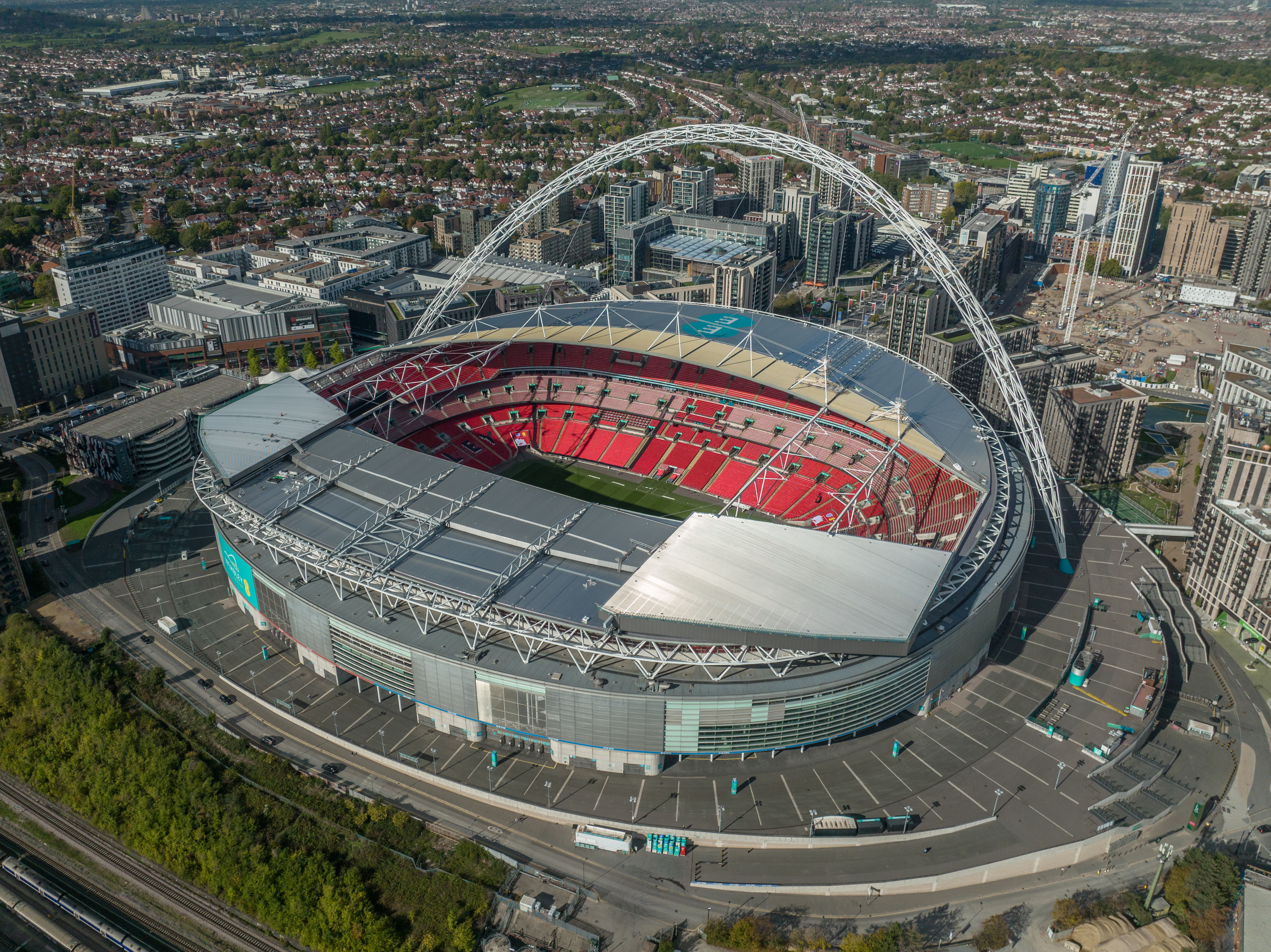
- Wembley Stadium hosted the final.
- Event: 2025–26 EFL Cup
Arsenal	Manchester City
0	2
- Date: 22 March 2026
- Venue: Wembley Stadium, London
- Man of the Match: Nico O'Reilly (Manchester City)
- Referee: Peter Bankes (Lancashire)
- Attendance: 88,486

The 2026 EFL Cup final was the final match of the 2025–26 EFL Cup. The match took place on 22 March 2026 at Wembley Stadium in London, England, between rivals Arsenal and Manchester City. The clubs have met in the 2018 EFL Cup final as well as in the 2014 FA Community Shield and the 2023 FA Community Shield —with the latter being Arsenal's most recent competitive title.

This was Arsenal's ninth League Cup final, the first EFL Cup final since losing to City in the 2018 EFL Cup final, and the first appearance in any final since the 2020 FA Cup final. They were seeking their first major trophy since winning the 2019–20 FA Cup and a first League Cup title since the 1993 Football League Cup final.

This was Manchester City's tenth League Cup final and the first EFL Cup final since their most recent win in the 2021 EFL Cup final against Tottenham Hotspur to secure their eighth overall and joint-record fourth consecutive title. They were looking for their first major cup competition title since winning the 2022–23 UEFA Champions League. (Note: Excluding their subsequent triumphs in the 2023 UEFA Super Cup, 2023 FIFA Club World Cup, and 2024 FA Community Shield, which are not considered as "major titles", as well as the 2023–24 Premier League, which is not a cup competition.)

== Route to the final ==
=== Arsenal ===
Round	Opposition	Score
3	Port Vale (A)	2–0
4	Brighton & Hove Albion (H)	2–0
QF	Crystal Palace (H)	1–1 (8–7 p)
SF	Chelsea (A)	3–2
SF	Chelsea (H)	1–0
Key: (H) = Home; (A) = Away

As a Premier League club involved in UEFA competitions, Arsenal entered in the third round and were drawn away to EFL League One club Port Vale. At Vale Park, on 24 September 2025, Arsenal won 2–0 with goals from Eberechi Eze – his first goal for the club – and Leandro Trossard. In the fourth round Arsenal were drawn at home to fellow Premier League club Brighton & Hove Albion. At the Emirates Stadium on 29 October 2025, Arsenal won 2–0 again with goals for the Gunners from Ethan Nwaneri and Bukayo Saka which sent the Gunners through to the quarter-finals. In the quarter-finals Arsenal were drawn against another Premier League club in Crystal Palace. At the Emirates Stadium on 23 December 2025, Arsenal drew 1–1 with an own goal from Maxence Lacroix being equalised by Marc Guéhi. As the game finished level after regulation time, it went straight to a penalty shoot-out which Arsenal won 8–7 with Martin Ødegaard, Declan Rice, Saka, Trossard, Mikel Merino, Riccardo Calafiori, Jurriën Timber and William Saliba all scoring their spot-kicks for the Gunners and Jean-Philippe Mateta, Justin Devenny, Will Hughes, Borna Sosa, Jefferson Lerma, Adam Wharton and Christantus Uche all converted their penalty kicks; Lacroix missed the decisive penalty kick to send Arsenal through to the semi-finals. In the semi-finals Arsenal were drawn against another fellow Premier League club and rivals Chelsea over two legs. Arsenal won the first leg 3–2 at Stamford Bridge on 14 January 2026 with two goals for Chelsea from Alejandro Garnacho and goals for Arsenal from Ben White, Viktor Gyökeres and Martín Zubimendi. Arsenal won the second leg 1–0 at the Emirates Stadium on 3 February 2026 with a goal from former Chelsea player Kai Havertz to give Arsenal a 4–2 aggregate victory and send them through to the final.

=== Manchester City ===
Round	Opposition	Score
3	Huddersfield Town (A)	2–0
4	Swansea City (A)	3–1
QF	Brentford (H)	2–0
SF	Newcastle United (A)	2–0
SF	Newcastle United (H)	3–1
Key: (H) = Home; (A) = Away

As a Premier League club involved in UEFA competitions, Manchester City entered in the third round and were drawn away to EFL League One club Huddersfield Town. At Kirklees Stadium, on 24 September 2025, Manchester City won 2–0 with goals from Phil Foden and Savinho. In the fourth round, they were drawn away to EFL Championship side Swansea City, played away at Swansea.com Stadium on 29 October 2025. The match finished 3–1 for the visitors, with Gonçalo Franco opening the scoring for Swansea City before three goals from Jérémy Doku, Omar Marmoush and Rayan Cherki for Manchester City. In the quarter-finals, City were drawn at home to fellow Premier League side Brentford, where they won 2–0 at City of Manchester Stadium on 17 December 2025 with goals from Cherki and Savinho. In the two-legged semi-final, City were drawn against cup holders Newcastle United, with the first leg played at St James' Park on 13 January 2026. City won 2–0 courtesy of freshly-signed Antoine Semenyo and Cherki. The second leg was played on 4 February, with Manchester City winning 3–1. Marmoush scored twice and Tijjani Reijnders scored once before Anthony Elanga picked up a consolation goal for Newcastle, giving Manchester City a 5–1 aggregate victory and sending them to the final.

== Match ==
=== Background ===
This saw Arsenal play in their first major cup final since the 2020 final, which they won against London rivals Chelsea, and seek their second major trophy under the management of their former player and captain Mikel Arteta. This final was a repeat of the 2018 final, when Arsène Wenger's Arsenal lost 3–0 to City, with Arteta as Pep Guardiola's assistant manager. Heading into the match, Arsenal could still win the quadruple of the EFL Cup, the FA Cup, the Premier League and the UEFA Champions League, which would be the first time an English team has achieved such a feat.

The clubs have been rivals since 2008, and competed for the Premier League title in the 2022–23 and 2023–24 seasons, with City winning on both occasions.

=== Team selection ===
Mikel Arteta made two changes from Arsenal's previous match a 2–0 home win (and a 3–1 aggregate victory) over Bundesliga club Bayer Leverkusen in the last 16 of the UEFA Champions League with cup goalkeeper Kepa Arrizabalaga coming in for number 1 David Raya and Kai Havertz replacing the injured Eberechi Eze with Jurriën Timber and captain Martin Ødegaard both also missing the final through injury with Ben White starting in place of Timber. Meanwhile, Pep Guardiola made four changes from Manchester City's previous match a 2–1 home defeat (and a 5–1 aggregate defeat) to La Liga club Real Madrid in the last 16 of the UEFA Champions League, with Guardiola sticking with cup goalkeeper James Trafford over number 1 Gianluigi Donnarumma with Nathan Aké in central defence and Nico O'Reilly at left-back, they replaced the injured Rúben Dias and Rayan Aït-Nouri and Antoine Semenyo took the place of Tijjani Reijnders further forward.

=== Summary ===
==== First half ====
Arsenal kicked-off the first-half in front of 88,486 spectators with Kai Havertz having the first chance of the match for Arsenal which was saved by City goalkeeper James Trafford after a shot from the right side of City's six yard box after an assist from Martín Zubimendi and captain Bukayo Saka then saw his shot for Arsenal saved by James Trafford in the 7th minute from a tight angle on the right and Bukayo Saka's follow-up shot was also saved by James Trafford. Leandro Trossard then saw his shot blocked by the City defence in the 12th minute after a shot from outside the box and Piero Hincapié then received the first yellow card of the match from referee Peter Bankes in the 16th minute for a foul on Matheus Nunes. Abdukodir Khusanov then received the second yellow card of the match in the 32nd minute for a foul on Viktor Gyökeres. Piero Hincapié then missed his shot for Arsenal in the 38th minute with a header from the left side of City's six yard box was too high after a corner kick from captain Bukayo Saka and Jérémy Doku then had his left footed shot for City blocked by the Arsenal defence from the left side of Arsenal's box in the 44th minute. In the final action of the opening half Erling Haaland missed his shot for City in the 45th minute after his header was too high after a cross from Antoine Semenyo.

==== Second half ====
Manchester City kicked off the second half with Erling Haaland having his shot for City blocked from the centre of Arsenal's penalty box after a cross from Antoine Semenyo in the 49th minute and Kai Havertz then had his left-footed shot from a tight angle on the left blocked by the City defence in the 50th minute. Kepa Arrizabalaga then received Arsenal's second yellow card in the 50th minute after coming out of his box and pulling down Jérémy Doku and Rodri then had his right-footed shot from outside the box blocked by the Arsenal defence following an assist from Rayan Cherki in the 55th minute. Antoine Semenyo then missed his left-footed shot for City from the right side of Arsenal's box in the 57th minute and Rayan Cherki then had his left-footed shot from the centre of Arsenal's box blocked by their defence in the 58th minute. Nathan Aké then had his left-footed shot from the centre of Arsenal's box blocked by the Arsenal defence in the 60th minute. Nico O'Reilly then opened the scoring for City with a header from a cross from the right by Rayan Cherki in the 60th minute after a mistake by Kepa Arrizabalaga. Nico O'Reilly then doubled City's lead with another header from a cross by Matheus Nunes in the 64th minute from the right. Mikel Arteta then made a double substitution for Arsenal in the 65th minute with Riccardo Calafiori replacing Piero Hincapié and Noni Madueke replacing Kai Havertz. Ben White was then booked for Arsenal in the 69th minute for a foul on Rayan Cherki. Riccardo Calafiori then saw his header from the centre of City's box saved in the top centre of the goal by James Trafford after a cross from Declan Rice. Riccardo Calafiori then hit the right post of City's goal with a left-footed shot from the left side of City's box after a headed pass from Leandro Trossard in the 78th minute. Mikel Arteta then made another double substitution for Arsenal in the 82nd minute with Gabriel Martinelli replacing Leandro Trossard and Gabriel Jesus replacing Ben White. Gabriel Jesus then hit the bar of City's goal with a header from a tight angle on the left after a cross from Noni Madueke and captain Bukayo Saka then missed his left-footed shot for Arsenal from the centre of City's box after an assist from Declan Rice. Jérémy Doku then missed his right-footed shot for City from outside Arsenal's box, which was close after an assist from Nathan Aké. Pep Guardiola then made what turned out to be City's sole substitution with Phil Foden replacing Rayan Cherki in the 90th minute with the match ending 2–0 to Manchester City to give them their first EFL Cup triumph since the 2021 EFL Cup final against Tottenham Hotspur and meant that it denied Arsenal the chance of winning an unprecedented quadruple of the FA Cup, the EFL Cup, the UEFA Champions League and the Premier League. Arsenal would go on to win the Premier League two months later, with City being runners-up while Manchester City would go on to win the FA Cup and Arsenal being knocked out by Championship club Southampton in the semi-finals.

=== Details ===
22 March 2026
16:30 GMT

Arsenal	0–2	Manchester City
	Report	O'Reilly 60', 64'

Wembley Stadium, London
Attendance: 88,486
Referee: Peter Bankes (Lancashire)

Arsenal	Manchester City

GK	13	(Spain) Kepa Arrizabalaga	(yellow card) 50'
RB	4	(England) Ben White	(yellow card) 69'	(substituted off) 82'
CB	2	(France) William Saliba
CB	6	(Brazil) Gabriel Magalhães
LB	5	(Ecuador) Piero Hincapié	(yellow card) 16'	(substituted off) 65'
CM	36	(Spain) Martín Zubimendi
CM	41	(England) Declan Rice
RW	7	(England) Bukayo Saka (c)
AM	29	(Germany) Kai Havertz	(substituted off) 66'
LW	19	(Belgium) Leandro Trossard	(substituted off) 82'
CF	14	(Sweden) Viktor Gyökeres
Substitutes:
GK	1	(Spain) David Raya
DF	3	(Spain) Cristhian Mosquera
DF	33	(Italy) Riccardo Calafiori	(substituted on) 65'
DF	49	(England) Myles Lewis-Skelly
MF	16	(Denmark) Christian Nørgaard
FW	9	(Brazil) Gabriel Jesus	(substituted on) 82'
FW	11	(Brazil) Gabriel Martinelli	(substituted on) 82'
FW	20	(England) Noni Madueke	(substituted on) 66'
FW	56	(England) Max Dowman
Manager:
(Spain) Mikel Arteta

GK	1	(England) James Trafford
RB	27	(Portugal) Matheus Nunes
CB	45	(Uzbekistan) Abdukodir Khusanov	(yellow card) 33'
CB	6	(Netherlands) Nathan Aké
LB	33	(England) Nico O'Reilly
DM	16	(Spain) Rodri
RM	10	(France) Rayan Cherki	(substituted off) 90'
CM	20	(Portugal) Bernardo Silva (c)
LM	11	(Belgium) Jérémy Doku
CF	42	(Ghana) Antoine Semenyo
CF	9	(Norway) Erling Haaland
Substitutes:
GK	25	(Italy) Gianluigi Donnarumma
DF	5	(England) John Stones
DF	21	(Algeria) Rayan Aït-Nouri
MF	4	(Netherlands) Tijjani Reijnders
MF	8	(Croatia) Mateo Kovačić
MF	14	(Spain) Nico González
MF	26	(Brazil) Savinho
MF	47	(England) Phil Foden	(substituted on) 90'
FW	7	(Egypt) Omar Marmoush
Manager:
(Spain) Pep Guardiola

Man of the Match:
Nico O'Reilly (Manchester City)

Assistant referees:
Neil Davies
Steve Meredith
Fourth official:
Tom Bramall
Reserve assistant referee:
Marc Perry
Video assistant referee:
John Brooks
Assistant video assistant referee:
Dan Robathan

Match rules

- 90 minutes
- 30 minutes of extra time if necessary
- Penalty shoot-out if scores still level
- Maximum of nine named substitutes
- Maximum of five substitutions, with a sixth allowed in extra time
- Maximum of three substitution opportunities, with a fourth allowed in extra time
- Maximum of one concussion substitution, granting the opposition an additional standalone substitution

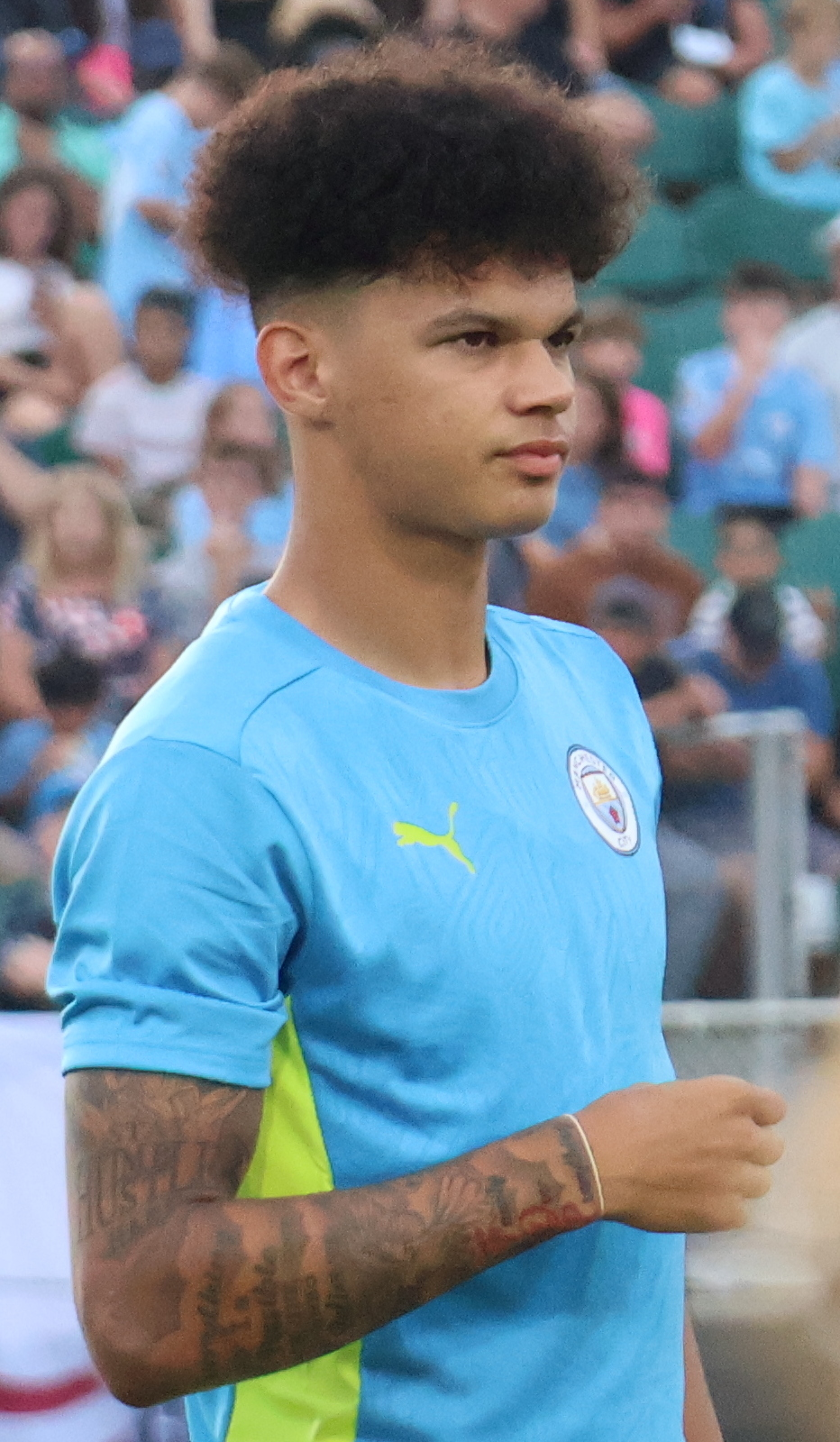
Nico O'Reilly (pictured in 2024) scored two goals and was awarded the Alan Hardaker Trophy as the Player of the Match.

== Post-match ==
=== Reaction ===
Manchester City reclaimed the EFL Cup for the first time in five years since their 1–0 triumph in the 2021 final against Ryan Mason's Tottenham Hotspur. On the other hand, this denied Arsenal their first major trophy in six years since the 2020 final against North-West London derby rivals Chelsea in a 2–1 triumph.

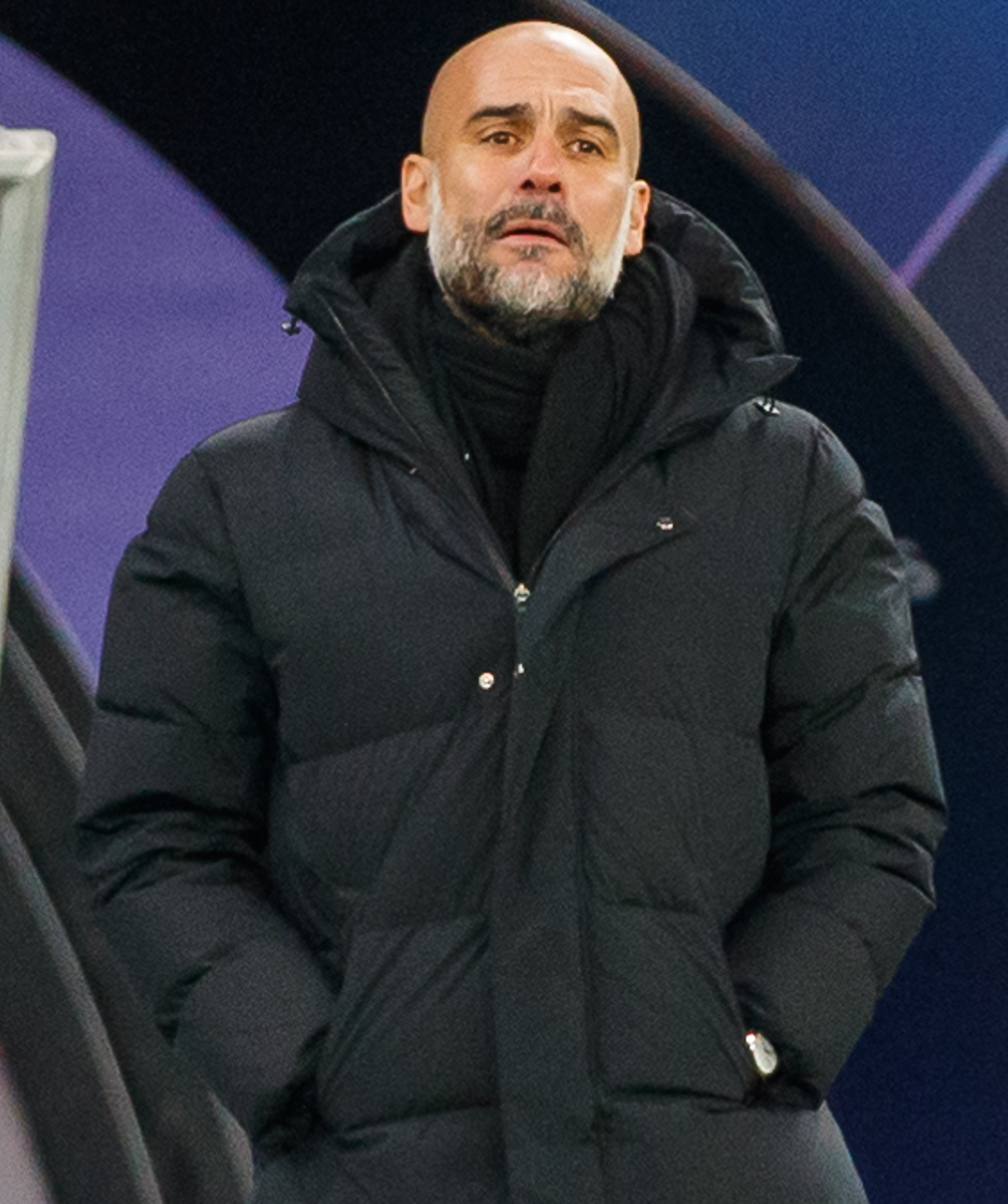
Pep Guardiola (pictured in 2021) won his fifth EFL Cup title which is the most of any manager in EFL Cup history beating the likes of José Mourinho, Brian Clough and Sir Alex Ferguson (who all have won four EFL Cups) and Bob Paisley and George Graham (who have both won three EFL Cups)

== Broadcasting ==
The final was televised live in the United Kingdom via pay-TV broadcaster Sky, who showed the game on Sky One, as well as the Sky Sports Main Event and Sky Sports Football channels. For the second year in a row, the Sky Sports Football channel was also simulcast on free-to-air channel ITV1 (STV in Scotland). The final was available for streaming on Sky Go and Now, with Sky's coverage also streamed live on ITVX and STV Player. On radio, match coverage was aired on BBC Radio 5 Live and Talksport. It was also aired live on broadcast television through CBS and streamed on Paramount+ in the United States.
