= James Blair (footballer) =

Scottish footballer (1883–1913)

Personal information
- Date of birth: 8 August 1883
- Place of birth: Dumfries, Scotland
- Date of death: 24 March 1913 (aged 29)
- Place of death: Dumfries, Scotland
- Positions: Half back; inside forward

Senior career*
Years	Team	Apps	(Gls)
1903–1905	Kilmarnock	50	(13)
1905–1906	Arsenal	13	(3)
1906–1910	Manchester City	76	(0)
1910–1912	Bradford City	39	(4)
1912–1913	Stockport County		
Total		178	(20)
- * Club domestic league appearances and goals

James Blair (8 August 1883 – 24 March 1913) was a Scottish professional footballer who played as a half back or inside forward.

== Career ==
Born in Dumfries, Blair played for Kilmarnock, Arsenal, Manchester City, Bradford City and Stockport County. For Arsenal, he made 13 appearances in the Football League. For Manchester City, he made 76 appearances in the Football League; he also made 5 FA Cup appearances. For Bradford City, he made 39 appearances in the Football League; he also made three FA Cup appearances.

== Suicide ==
Blair committed suicide in 1913. He was found by his brother after slitting his own throat at home. He had reportedly been despondent over ill health and being unable to take part in the Easter matches.

== Sources ==
- Frost, Terry (1988). Bradford City A Complete Record 1903-1988. Breedon Books Sport. ISBN 0-907969-38-0.
