= Nico O'Reilly =

English footballer (born 2005)

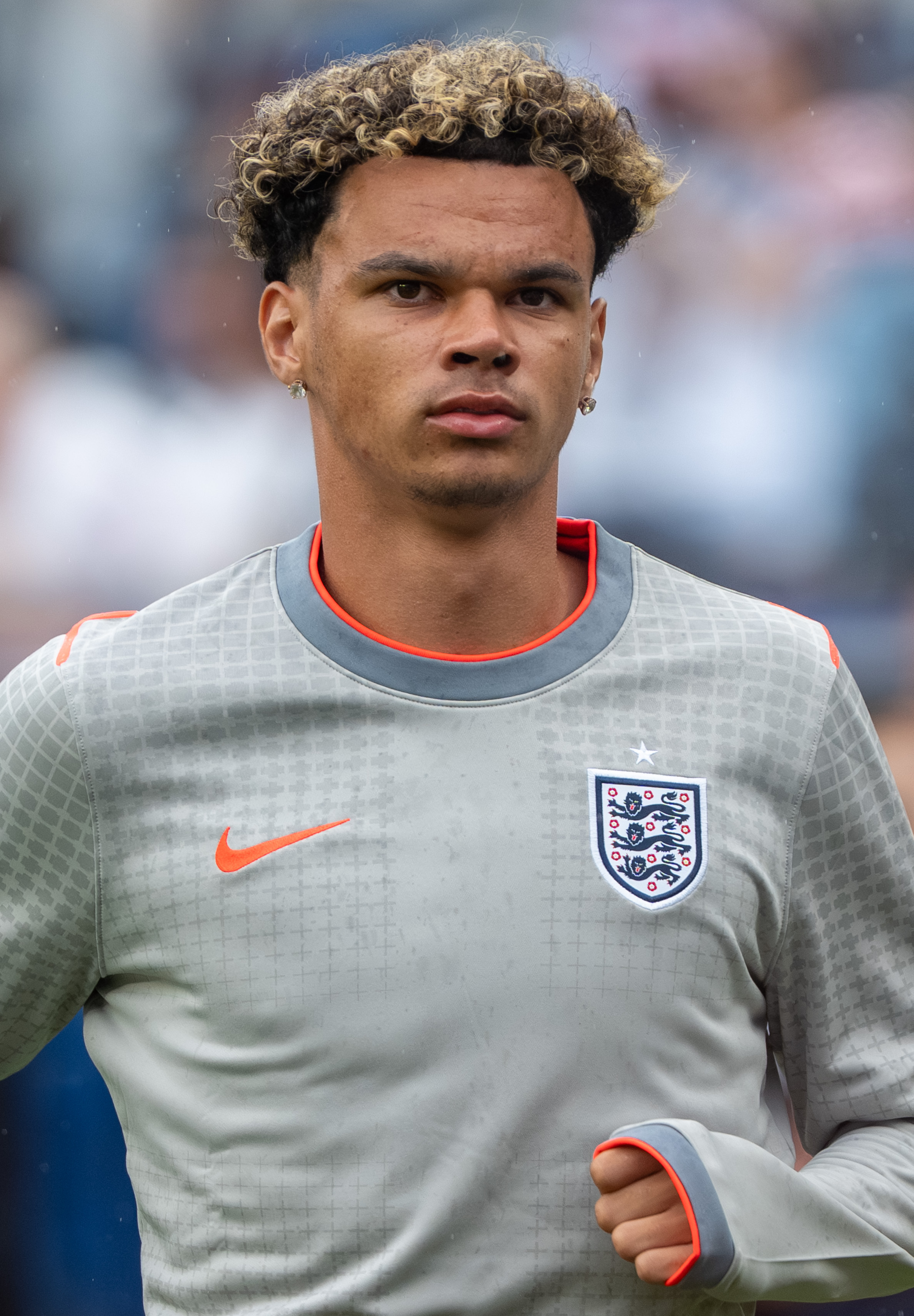
- O'Reilly with England in 2026

Personal information
- Full name: Nico O'Reilly
- Date of birth: 21 March 2005 (age 21)
- Place of birth: Manchester, England
- Height: 6 ft 4 in (1.93 m)
- Positions: Left-back; midfielder

Team information
- Current team: Manchester City
- Number: 33

Youth career
- 2013–2022: Manchester City

Senior career*
Years	Team	Apps	(Gls)
2022–	Manchester City	47	(7)

International career^{‡}
2019–2020	England U15	2	(0)
2021	England U16	1	(0)
2021–2022	England U17	10	(1)
2022–2023	England U18	4	(0)
2024–2025	England U20	3	(0)
2025–	England	13	(0)
Medal record
Men's football
Representing England
FIFA World Cup
Third place	2026 Canada–Mexico–US
- * Club domestic league appearances and goals as of 23:00, 20 September 2026 (UTC) ‡ National team caps and goals as of 20:45, 26 September 2026 (UTC)

Nico O'Reilly (born 21 March 2005) is an English professional footballer who plays as a left-back or midfielder for Premier League club Manchester City and the England national team.

A product of Manchester City's academy, O'Reilly made his senior debut in 2024. He won his first major trophy with the club in his second season, scoring two goals in the 2026 EFL Cup final.

A youth international for England, O'Reilly made his senior debut in 2025, representing the side at the 2026 FIFA World Cup.

== Early life ==
Nico O'Reilly was born on 21 March 2005 in Manchester. He was first spotted by Manchester City scouts at age six while playing football in the Moston area of Manchester, and he joined the club's academy two years later at age eight. He was raised by his mother, Holli, on an estate on the border of Ancoats and Collyhurst. He attended Mather Street Primary School in Failsworth.

== Club career ==
=== Manchester City ===
==== Early career ====
O'Reilly moved up to the Manchester City under-23 side towards the end of the 2021–22 season, and subsequently signed his first professional contract with the club in July 2022. O'Reilly captained the under-18s during the 2022–23 season. He made some headlines after he was filmed scoring an overhead scorpion kick in the 95th minute of an under-18s match for Manchester City against Middlesbrough in April 2023. A week later, he scored with a forty-yard chip against Manchester United under-18s.

O'Reilly trained with the Manchester City first-team on a warm weather training camp to Abu Dhabi in December 2022. He was included in the match day squad for their Premier League fixture away to Brighton & Hove Albion on 24 May 2023, but remained on the substitutes' bench.

==== 2024–25 season ====
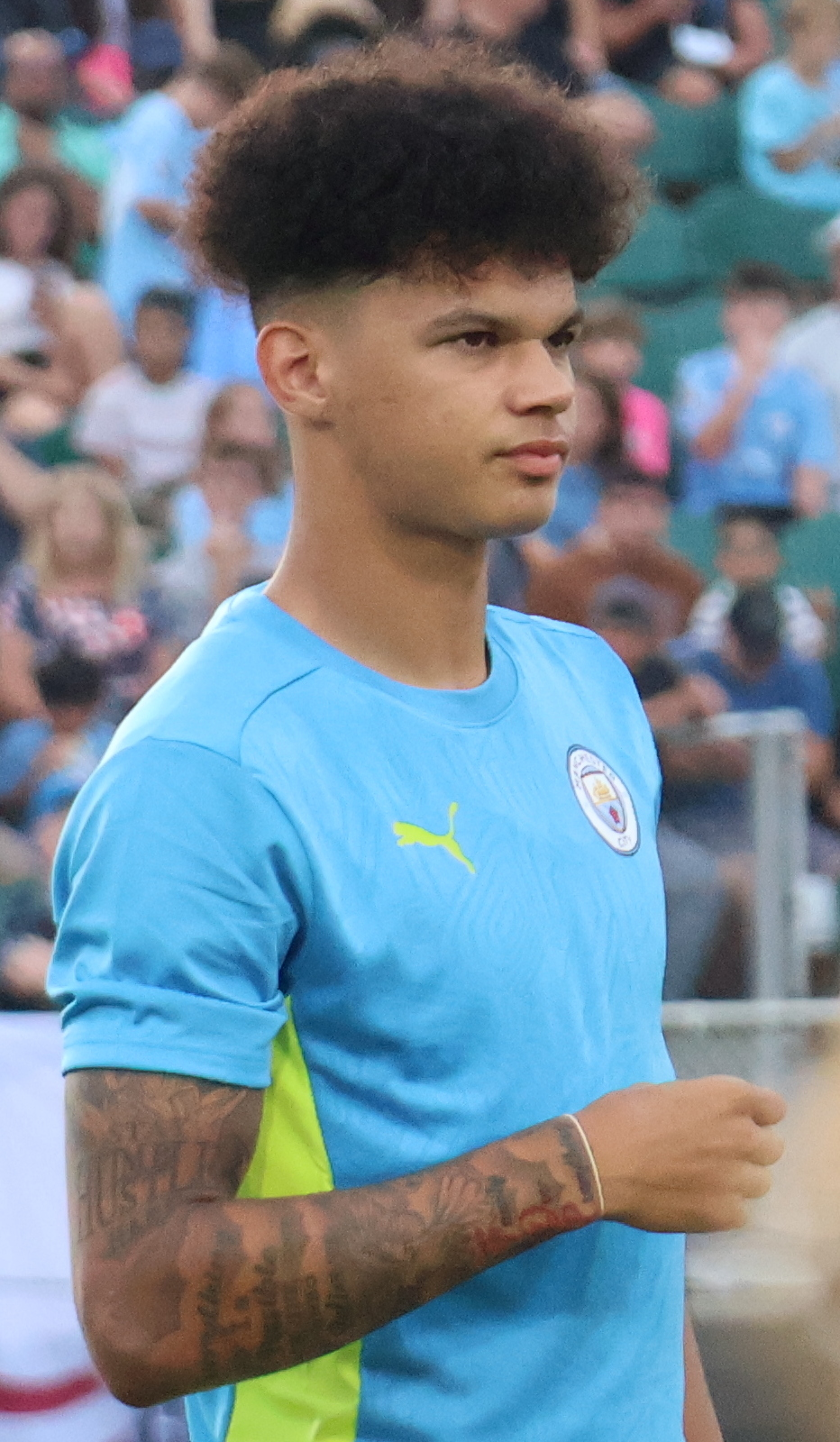
O'Reilly with Manchester City in 2024

O'Reilly made his senior debut in the 2024 FA Community Shield against Manchester United on 10 August 2024. On 11 January 2025, O'Reilly scored his first goal for Manchester City in an FA Cup third round home match against League Two side Salford City which eventually ended in an 8–0 win. Two months later, on 1 March, he netted his first career brace with two goals in a 3–1 home win over Championship side Plymouth Argyle in the fifth round of the competition. In the following quarter-final, on 30 March, he assisted both goals in a 2–1 away victory over Bournemouth, playing a role in his team's progression to the semi-finals and earning the Man of the Match award for his performance. On 2 April, O'Reilly made his first Premier League start for City in a 2–0 home win against Leicester City, playing the full 90 minutes. On 12 April, O'Reilly scored his first goal in the Premier League in a 5–2 City victory at home against Crystal Palace.

==== 2025–26 season ====
On 26 September 2025, O'Reilly signed a new five-year contract with Manchester City, keeping him at the club until the summer of 2030. O'Reilly scored his first Champions League goal in a 2–1 victory over Real Madrid on 10 December 2025. On 21 February 2026, O'Reilly scored his first league brace to secure a 2–1 victory over Newcastle United and cut Arsenal's lead in the league to just two points. A month later, on 22 March, the day after he turned 21, O'Reilly scored a brace in a 2–0 victory against Arsenal in the EFL Cup final, securing his club's ninth title in the competition.

== International career ==
O'Reilly with England at the 2026 FIFA World Cup

O'Reilly scored his first goal for the England U17 side in the 88th minute of a 2–2 draw away against Slovakia on 21 October 2022.

On 6 September 2024, O'Reilly made his England U20 debut during a 1–1 draw away to Turkey. On 29 August 2025, O'Reilly was called up to the under-21s.

On 6 October 2025, O'Reilly received his first call-up to the England senior team after Reece James withdrew from the squad with injury. He was an unused substitute in England's 3–0 friendly win over Wales at Wembley Stadium on 9 October.

He made his England senior team debut during a 2–0 win over Serbia at Wembley Stadium in a 2026 FIFA World Cup qualifier.

On 22 May 2026, O'Reilly was selected in the 26-man squad for the 2026 FIFA World Cup. On 17 June, he made his World Cup debut, starting at left back in England's opening match against Croatia. In the following match against Ghana, O'Reilly appeared as 66th-minute substitute for Djed Spence, hitting the crossbar from a header in the 87th-minute, as the match finished in a 0–0 draw. He returned to the starting line-up for the 2–0 win over Panama in the final group match, and retained his place for the knockout stage as England beat DR Congo, Mexico and Norway to reach the semi-finals.

== Style of play ==
O'Reilly has been described as an attacking midfielder with "flair" who is "graceful and fluid with the ball at his feet". O'Reilly has also been described as "Positionless" when starting at left-back due to his ability to carry the ball, push high up, and quickly transition between attack and defense thanks to his physicality and "completeness".

== Career statistics ==
=== Club ===
As of match played 20 September 2026

Appearances and goals by club, season and competition
Club	Season	League			FA Cup		EFL Cup		Europe		Other		Total	
Club	Season	Division	Apps	Goals	Apps	Goals	Apps	Goals	Apps	Goals	Apps	Goals	Apps	Goals
Manchester City	2021–22	—			—		—		—		1 (Note: Appearance(s) in EFL Trophy)	0	1	0
Manchester City	2022–23	—			—		—		—		2	0	2	0
Manchester City	2024–25	—			—		—		—		2	0	2	0
Manchester City	Total		—		—		—		—		5	0	5	0
Manchester City	2024–25	Premier League	9	2	6	3	2	0	1 (Note: Appearance(s) in UEFA Champions League)	0	3 (Note: One appearance in FA Community Shield, two appearances in FIFA Club World Cup)	0	21	5
Manchester City	2025–26	Premier League	34	5	6	1	5	2	8	1	—		53	9
Manchester City	2026–27	Premier League	4	0	0	0	1	0	0	0	1 (Note: Appearance in FA Community Shield)	0	6	0
Manchester City	Total		47	7	12	4	8	2	9	1	4	0	80	14
Career total			47	7	12	4	8	2	9	1	9	0	85	14

=== International ===
As of match played 26 September 2026

Appearances and goals by national team and year
National team	Year	Apps	Goals
England	2025	2	0
England	2026	11	0
Total		13	0

== Honours ==
Manchester City

- FA Cup: 2025–26
- EFL Cup: 2025–26
- FA Community Shield: 2024

England

- FIFA World Cup third place: 2026

Individual

- Premier League Fan Team of the Season: 2025–26
- Alan Hardaker Trophy: 2026
- Manchester City Player of the Season: 2025–26
- Premier League Young Player of the Season: 2025–26
- PFA Young Player of the Year: 2025–26
- PFA Team of the Year: 2025–26 Premier League
