= 2018 EFL Cup final =

- Match programme cover
- Event: 2017–18 EFL Cup
Arsenal	Manchester City
0	3
- Date: 25 February 2018
- Venue: Wembley Stadium, London
- Man of the Match: Vincent Kompany (Manchester City)
- Referee: Craig Pawson (South Yorkshire)
- Attendance: 85,671

The 2018 EFL Cup final (also known as the 2018 Carabao Cup final for sponsorship reasons) was the final association football match of the 2017–18 EFL Cup that took place on 25 February 2018 at Wembley Stadium. It was the first League Cup final contested under the "Carabao Cup" name following the sponsorship of Carabao Energy Drink. It was contested between Manchester City and Arsenal, and won 3–0 by Manchester City. They would have entered the second qualifying round of the 2018–19 UEFA Europa League, but instead qualified directly for the 2018–19 UEFA Champions League by finishing first in the 2017–18 Premier League.

The match was Manchester City's sixth League Cup final, and their third in five seasons – qualification for the final also marked the first time Pep Guardiola reached a final with Manchester City. For Arsenal, the final was their eighth total in the competition, and their third of Arsène Wenger's managerial reign.

== Route to the final ==
The EFL Cup is a cup competition open to clubs in the Premier League and English Football League. It is played on a knockout basis, with the exception of the semi-finals, which are contested over a two-legged tie.

=== Manchester City ===
Round	Opposition	Score
3rd	West Bromwich Albion (A)	2–1
4th	Wolverhampton Wanderers (H)	0–0 (4–1 p.)
5th	Leicester City F.C. (A)	1–1 (4–3 p.)
Semi-final	Bristol City (H)	2–1
Semi-final	Bristol City (A)	3–2
Key: (H) = Home venue; (A) = Away venue.

Manchester City, a Premier League club involved in the UEFA Champions League, started their League Cup campaign in the third round, where they had been drawn away to fellow divisional opponents West Bromwich Albion. At The Hawthorns, winger Leroy Sané scored twice to give City a 2–1 victory. In the fourth round they faced Championship side Wolverhampton Wanderers at home. The visitors defended well and became the first team to keep a clean sheet against the Premier League leaders. Neither side scored after normal and extra time meaning the tie was decided by a penalty shoot-out. City progressed as 4–1 winners.

For the quarter-finals, Manchester City were drawn away to Leicester City at the King Power Stadium. Midfielder Bernardo Silva scored for the visitors, but deep into added time, striker Jamie Vardy equalised for Leicester from the penalty spot. The game finished 1–1 and much like the previous round City needed penalties to progress, winning the shoot-out 4–3. The semi-final pitted Manchester City against Championship side Bristol City. The first leg played at the Etihad Stadium saw the visitors take the lead towards the end of the first half, having been awarded a penalty that Bobby Reid converted. Kevin De Bruyne equalised for Manchester City and in injury time his teammate Sergio Agüero scored the winner to put the team firmly in control of the tie. Bristol City scored twice at Ashton Gate in the return leg, but Manchester City progressed to the final having won by three goals and recording a 5–3 aggregate score.

=== Arsenal ===
Round	Opposition	Score
3rd	Doncaster Rovers (H)	1–0
4th	Norwich City (H)	2–1 (a.e.t.)
5th	West Ham United (H)	1–0
Semi-final	Chelsea (A)	0–0
Semi-final	Chelsea (H)	2–1
Key: (H) = Home venue; (A) = Away venue.

Arsenal, like Manchester City were involved in Europe (UEFA Europa League) and entered the League Cup in the third round. They were drawn at home against Football League One side Doncaster Rovers. At the Emirates Stadium, Theo Walcott's goal in the 25th minute was enough to settle the outcome in favour of Arsenal. In the next round they faced Championship club Norwich City at home. Arsenal progressed with a 2–1 win after extra time after Eddie Nketiah was brought on as a substitute and scored his first two goals for the club.

Arsenal played against West Ham United in the quarter-finals, where at home they won 1–0 thanks to a goal from Danny Welbeck. The semi-finals pitted Arsenal against London rivals Chelsea. After a goalless first leg at Stamford Bridge, Arsenal progressed to the final after a 2–1 win at the Emirates Stadium due to an own goal from Chelsea's Antonio Rüdiger and a goal from Granit Xhaka. As a result, Arsenal reached the final without leaving London as four of their five games were at home, with the away leg of the semi-final being played in London. Their tally of six goals on their way to the final represented the lowest goal-tally of any side to reach a League Cup final.

== Match ==
=== Summary ===
In the 18th minute of the match Sergio Agüero opened the scoring when he ran in on goal and lobbed the ball over the advancing goalkeeper David Ospina with his right foot from the edge of the penalty area after an initial clash with Arsenal defender Shkodran Mustafi who appealed for a foul.

Vincent Kompany got the second in the 58th minute. A corner from the right by Kevin De Bruyne found İlkay Gündoğan on the edge of the penalty area, and his low shot was diverted into the net by Kompany with his left leg from seven yards out. David Silva got the third in the 65th minute when he shot low across and past the goalkeeper with his left foot from inside the left of the penalty area from seven yards out.

=== Details ===
25 February 2018
16:30 GMT

Arsenal	0–3	Manchester City
	Report	Agüero 18'; Kompany 58'; D. Silva 65'

Wembley Stadium, London
Attendance: 85,671
Referee: Craig Pawson (South Yorkshire)

Arsenal	Manchester City

GK	13	(Colombia) David Ospina
CB	21	(England) Calum Chambers	(yellow card) 47'	(substituted off) 65'
CB	20	(Germany) Shkodran Mustafi
CB	6	(France) Laurent Koscielny (c)
RM	24	(Spain) Héctor Bellerín	(yellow card) 24'
CM	10	(England) Jack Wilshere	(yellow card) 88'
CM	29	(Switzerland) Granit Xhaka
LM	18	(Spain) Nacho Monreal		(substituted off) 26'
RW	11	(Germany) Mesut Özil
LW	8	(Wales) Aaron Ramsey	(yellow card) 32'	(substituted off) 73'
CF	14	(Gabon) Pierre-Emerick Aubameyang
Substitutes:
GK	33	(Czech Republic) Petr Čech
DF	4	(Germany) Per Mertesacker
DF	31	(Bosnia and Herzegovina) Sead Kolašinac		(substituted on) 26'
MF	30	(England) Ainsley Maitland-Niles
MF	35	(Egypt) Mohamed Elneny
FW	17	(Nigeria) Alex Iwobi		(substituted on) 73'
FW	23	(England) Danny Welbeck		(substituted on) 65'
Manager:
(France) Arsène Wenger

GK	1	(Chile) Claudio Bravo
RB	2	(England) Kyle Walker
CB	4	(Belgium) Vincent Kompany (c)	(yellow card) 80'
CB	30	(Argentina) Nicolás Otamendi
LB	3	(Brazil) Danilo
CM	8	(Germany) İlkay Gündoğan
CM	25	(Brazil) Fernandinho	(yellow card) 36'	(substituted off) 52'
CM	21	(Spain) David Silva
RW	17	(Belgium) Kevin De Bruyne
LW	19	(Germany) Leroy Sané		(substituted off) 77'
CF	10	(Argentina) Sergio Agüero		(substituted off) 89'
Substitutes:
GK	31	(Brazil) Ederson
DF	5	(England) John Stones
DF	14	(France) Aymeric Laporte
MF	20	(Portugal) Bernardo Silva		(substituted on) 52'
MF	35	(Ukraine) Oleksandr Zinchenko
MF	47	(England) Phil Foden		(substituted on) 89'
FW	33	(Brazil) Gabriel Jesus		(substituted on) 77'
Manager:
(Spain) Pep Guardiola

Man of the Match:
Vincent Kompany (Manchester City)

Assistant referees:
Gary Beswick (Durham)
Adam Nunn (Wiltshire)
Fourth official:
Graham Scott (Berks & Bucks)
Reserve assistant referee:
Ian Hussin (Liverpool)
Video assistant referee:
Neil Swarbrick (Lancashire)
Assistant video assistant referee:
Peter Kirkup (Northamptonshire)

Match rules

- 90 minutes
- 30 minutes of extra time if necessary
- Penalty shoot-out (ABBA) if scores still level
- Seven named substitutes, of which up to three may be used; a fourth substituted is allowed in extra time

== See also ==
- 2018 FA Cup final
