= 2026–27 Arsenal F.C. season =

English football club season

Arsenal F.C.
2026–27 season
- Owner: Kroenke Sports & Entertainment
- Co-chairmen: Stan Kroenke; Josh Kroenke
- Manager: Mikel Arteta
- Stadium: Emirates Stadium
- Premier League: 1st
- FA Cup: Third round
- EFL Cup: Fourth round
- FA Community Shield: Winners
- UEFA Champions League: League phase
- Top goalscorer: League: Kai Havertz; Martin Ødegaard; Bukayo Saka (3 each); All: Martin Ødegaard (5)
- Highest home attendance: 60,315 v Leeds United (10 Oct 2026, Premier League)
- Lowest home attendance: 57,024 v Lille (13 Oct 2026, UEFA Champions League)
- Average home league attendance: 60,229
- Biggest win: 3–0 v Manchester City (Neutral, 16 Aug 2026, FA Community Shield); 3–0 v Coventry City (Home, 21 Aug 2026, Premier League); 3–0 v Lille (Home, 13 Oct 2026, UEFA Champions League)
- Biggest defeat: 0–3 v Brighton & Hove Albion (Away, 19 Sep 2026, Premier League)
Home colours	Away colours	Third colours

The 2026–27 season is Arsenal Football Club's 35th season in the Premier League, their 101st consecutive season in the top flight of English football, becoming the first team to spend over 100 consecutive seasons in the English top flight, and 110th season in the top flight overall. In addition to the domestic league, Arsenal are also participating in this season's editions of the FA Cup, EFL Cup, FA Community Shield and UEFA Champions League, the latter of which is their 41st European campaign. The season covers the period from 1 July 2026 to 30 June 2027.

== Review ==
=== Background ===
Arsenal entered the season as the reigning league champions, having won the 2025–26 Premier League title, their first top-flight title since the 2003–04 season. Arsenal made significant use of set pieces throughout the season, particularly from corners, scoring 25 set-piece goals (excluding penalties), the highest total in the league, while also setting a new record for goals scored from corners in a single Premier League campaign, with 19. Arsenal's defence was once again a key factor in their success. They kept a league-high 19 clean sheets, while conceding the fewest shots (310), shots on target (90), big chances (50) and expected goals (28.5) in the 2025–26 Premier League season. Their average of 0.7 goals conceded per game was also the lowest among clubs in Europe's top five leagues. The 19 clean sheets were Arsenal's most in a Premier League season since 1998–99, while David Raya's 19 clean sheets matched the club record for a single Premier League season.

In Europe, Arsenal topped the 2025–26 UEFA Champions League league phase with a maximum 24 points from eight wins in eight matches, conceding only three goals. After defeating Sporting, Bayer Leverkusen and Atlético Madrid in the knockout stages, Arsenal faced Paris Saint-Germain in the final, their first European final since the 2018–19 UEFA Europa League final and their first Champions League final since the 2005–06 season. Arsenal lost the final 4–3 on penalties after the match ended 1–1 following extra time, despite completing their European campaign unbeaten.

For the first time since the 2016–17 season, Arsenal are without Reiss Nelson after the club terminated his contract by mutual consent. As a result of his departure, this is the first season that the squad does not contain a player that played under Arsène Wenger, since before the debut of former captain Tony Adams.

=== First team transfers (summer transfer window) ===
The Premier League's summer 2026 transfer window officially opened on 15 June and is scheduled to close on 1 September at 23:00 BST. The window followed the 2026 FIFA World Cup, which was held from 11 June to 19 July 2026, meaning clubs could complete transfers both before and after the tournament.

On 1 July 2026, Arsenal confirmed the permanent signing of defender Piero Hincapié from Bayer Leverkusen, having activated the option to sign him permanently following his loan spell at the club. Hincapié made 39 appearances in all competitions during the 2025–26 season and helped Arsenal win the Premier League title. On the other hand, Karl Hein and Jakub Kiwior completed permanent transfers to Werder Bremen and Porto, respectively, after their respective loan clubs exercised options to sign them permanently.

On 9 July, free agent goalkeeper Illan Meslier, formerly of Leeds United, signed a two-year deal with Arsenal, with the option to extend for a further year.

On 15 July 2026, Leandro Trossard left Arsenal to join Turkish Süper Lig side Beşiktaş for a reported £17.1 million. Trossard joined Arsenal from Brighton & Hove Albion in January 2023 and made 174 appearances for the club, scoring 36 goals. During his time at Arsenal, he contributed to a number of important moments, including scoring the equalising goal against Manchester City in the 2023 Community Shield final and scoring a crucial late winner against West Ham United during Arsenal's 2025–26 Premier League title-winning campaign. He helped Arsenal win the Premier League title in his final season at the club.

On 22 July 2026, Arsenal announced the signing of Greek forward Christos Tzolis from Club Brugge on a long-term contract for £34 million. Tzolis joined Arsenal after an impressive 2025–26 season with Club Brugge, during which he helped the club win the Belgian Pro League title and was named the league's Player of the Season. He scored 22 goals and provided 29 assists in all competitions during the campaign.

On 5 August 2026, Arsenal confirmed the departure of Christian Nørgaard to Everton on a permanent deal.

On 8 August 2026, Arsenal signed Brazilian midfielder Bruno Guimarães from Newcastle United for a reported £75 million.

On 21 August 2026, Arsenal announced the signing of Ezri Konsa from Aston Villa for a reported £55 million, with £51 million paid as a fixed fee and a further £4 million in potential add-ons.

On 1 September 2026, Gabriel Jesus left the club to join Barcelona, while midfielder Fábio Vieira joined Hamburger SV on a permanent deal following his loan spell. Two days later, it was confirmed that Gabriel Martinelli joined Saudi Arabian club Al-Hilal for £60 million, becoming Arsenal's record departure.

=== August ===

Starting XI (4–3–3 formation) for the Community Shield final against Manchester City on 16 August 2026

On 16 August 2026, Arsenal began the season with a 3–0 victory over the FA Cup winners Manchester City in the Community Shield final, winning the competition for the 18th time in the club's history. Riccardo Calafiori opened the scoring in the 23rd second of the match, making it the fastest goal in Community Shield final history, after being played through on goal by Myles Lewis-Skelly. A header from Kai Havertz doubled Arsenal's lead, with new signing Christos Tzolis providing the assist following a curled cross from captain Martin Ødegaard. Tzolis provided another assist for Arsenal's third goal, finding Ødegaard inside the box, with the Norwegian sending Gianluigi Donnarumma the wrong way with a feint before calmly finishing into the empty net. With his two assists, Tzolis became the first player to provide two or more assists in a Community Shield match since David Beckham did so for Manchester United against Newcastle United in 1996.

On 21 August, Arsenal began their title defence with a 3–0 home victory over newly promoted Coventry City in the Premier League. Kai Havertz opened the scoring with a composed finish following an assist from Riccardo Calafiori, before Bukayo Saka doubled the lead eight minutes later in the 23rd minute, calmly finishing in the empty net. Martin Ødegaard added a third in the 49th minute, with his shot taking a deflection on its way into the net, securing Arsenal's first three points of the season. New signing Christos Tzolis impressed once again, receiving praise from both supporters and the media. Ten days later, on 31 August, Arsenal secured a 1–0 away victory over Aston Villa in the Premier League. Bukayo Saka scored the only goal, sliding the ball into the net from a Riccardo Calafiori cut-back. Ezri Konsa also made his Arsenal debut as a substitute, becoming the first player since Petr Čech against Chelsea in 2015 to make his debut for a club against the team he had joined from.

=== September ===

Starting XI (4–2-3-1 formation) for Premier League home match against Chelsea on 6 September

On 6 September, Arsenal defeated London rivals Chelsea 2–1 at the Emirates Stadium in the Premier League. Morgan Rodgers gave Chelsea the lead in the 2nd minute of the game, scoring the first goal Mikel Arteta's side has conceded this season. Kai Havertz equalised in the 25th minute, finding himself in a good position just outside of the box, before beating ex-Arsenal goalkeeper Emiliano Martinez at the near post. In the 50th minute, Christos Tzolis passed the ball forward, with Kai Havertz's clever dummy letting it go to captain Martin Ødegaard who slotted it in to give Arsenal the lead.

On 9 September, Arsenal began their European campaign with a 1–0 win at Diego Armando Maradona stadium against Napoli. Despite having 26 shots and 4.05 expected goals, Arsenal's only goal came from Martin Ødegaard's strike from the edge of the box, with Norwegian scoring his 4th goal in 5 matches. Three days later, Arsenal traveled to the Stadium of Light to face Sunderland. After a goalless first half, Sunderland were given a controversial penalty after Ezri Konsa pulled Daniel Ballard to the ground. Despite that, David Raya saved the penalty taken by Enzo Le Fée and two minutes later, Bruno Guimarães scored his first goal for Arsenal. Then in stoppage time, Reinildo Mandava fouled Bukayo Saka and was sent off after receiving a second yellow card. Saka converted the penalty that followed, and Arsenal won 2–0. Then in September 15th, Arsenal heavily rotated the squad for the EFL cup tie away at Portman Road to face Ipswich Town and prevailed 4–2 with a brace from Max Dowman and goals from Noni Madueke and Mikel Merino. Four days later, Arsenal faced Brighton away and lost 3–0 after goals from Pascal Groß, Charalampos Kostoulas, and Chema Andrés. This was the heaviest defeat for Arsenal since May 14, 2023 when they lost 3-0 at the Emirates, also to Brighton. With a Manchester City 5–3 win over Sunderland, City took first place with 15 points and Arsenal with 12 heading into the international break.

Over the international break, 17 players were called up for their national senior squad in September, Konsa, Saka, Eze, and Lewis-Skelly (England), Raya, Merino, and Zubimendi (Spain), Timber (Netherlands), Havertz (Germany), Tzolis (Greece), Odegaard (Norway), Calafiori (Italy), Gyokeres (Sweden), and Gabriel and Guimaraes (Brazil).

=== October ===

Starting XI (4–2-3-1 formation) for Premier League home match against Leeds United on 10 October

On October 10, Arsenal defeated Leeds United at the Emirates, despite going a goal down following goals from Calafiori and Guimarães, both their first goals at home. Afterwards, on October 13 in the Champions League, Lille OSC traveled to the Emirates and were beaten 3–0 following goals from Timber, Eze, and Saka. On October 18, 2026 Arsenal narrowly defeated Nottingham Forest following Noni Madueke's goal in the 80th minute to win 1–0.

== First team ==
=== First team coaching staff ===
Note: Age as of 22 November 2026.

Position	Name	Nationality	Date of birth (age)	Appointed on	Last club/team	Ref.
Manager	Mikel Arteta	Spain	26 Mar 1982 (age 44)	20 Dec 2019	(England) Manchester City (as assistant coach)	
Assistant coaches	Albert Stuivenberg	Netherlands	5 Aug 1970 (age 56)	24 Dec 2019	Wales (as assistant manager)	
Assistant coaches	Miguel Molina	Spain	3 Jan 1993 (age 33)	28 Aug 2020	(Spain) Atlético Madrid	
First team coach	Gabriel Heinze	Argentina	19 Apr 1978 (age 48)	8 Jul 2025	(Argentina) Newell's Old Boys (as head coach)	
Set-piece coach	Nicolas Jover	France	28 Oct 1981 (age 45)	5 Jul 2021	(England) Manchester City (as set-piece coach)	
Goalkeeping coach	Iñaki Caña	Spain	19 Sep 1975 (age 51)	24 Dec 2019	(England) Brentford	

=== First team squad ===
Notes:

- Squad numbers last updated on 5 August 2026. Age and contract details as of 22 November 2026.
- Flags indicate national team as defined under FIFA eligibility rules. Players may change their FIFA nationalities after the 2025–26 season, and may hold more than one non-FIFA nationality.
- Player^{*} – Player who joined Arsenal permanently or on loan during the season.
- Player^{†} – Player who departed Arsenal permanently or on loan during the season.
- Player (HG) – Player who fulfils the Premier League's "Home Grown Player" criteria.
- Player (CT) – Player who fulfils UEFA's "club-trained player" criteria.
- Player (AT) – Player who fulfils UEFA's "association-trained player" criteria.

No.	Player	Nat.	Position(s) (Footed)	Date of birth (age)	Height	Date signed	Signed from	Transfer fee	Contract ends	Ref.
Goalkeepers
1	David Raya (HG, AT) (Note: Raya graduated from Blackburn Rovers' academy.)	ESP	GK (R)	15 Sep 1995 (age 31)	1.83 m (6 ft 0 in)	15 Aug 2023 (loan); 4 Jul 2024	(England) Brentford	£3.0m (loan) £27.0m	2028	
13	Kepa Arrizabalaga	ESP	GK (R)	3 Oct 1994 (age 32)	1.89 m (6 ft 2 in)	1 Jul 2025	(England) Chelsea	£5.0m	2028	
30	Illan Meslier^{*}	FRA	GK (L)	2 Mar 2000 (age 26)	1.97 m (6 ft 5 in)	9 Jul 2026	Unattached	Free	2028+1	
Defenders
2	William Saliba (HG, CT)	FRA	CB (R)	24 Mar 2001 (age 25)	1.92 m (6 ft 4 in)	25 Jul 2019	(France) Saint-Étienne	£27.0m	2030	
3	Cristhian Mosquera	ESP	CB / RB (R)	27 Jun 2004 (age 22)	1.88 m (6 ft 2 in)	24 Jul 2025	(Spain) Valencia	£13.0m (initial fee)	2030+1	
4	Ben White (HG, AT) (Note: White graduated from Brighton & Hove Albion's academy.)	ENG	RB / CB (R)	8 Oct 1997 (age 29)	1.86 m (6 ft 1 in)	30 Jul 2021	(England) Brighton & Hove Albion	£50.0m	2028	
5	Piero Hincapié^{*}	ECU	CB / LB (L)	9 Jan 2002 (age 24)	1.84 m (6 ft 0 in)	1 Sep 2025	(Germany) Bayer Leverkusen	£34.0m	2031	
6	Gabriel Magalhães	BRA	CB (L)	19 Dec 1997 (age 28)	1.90 m (6 ft 3 in)	1 Sep 2020	(France) Lille	£23.1m	2029	
12	Jurriën Timber	NED	RB / LB / CB (R)	17 Jun 2001 (age 25)	1.79 m (5 ft 10 in)	14 Jul 2023	(Netherlands) Ajax	£34.3m (initial fee)	2028	
15	Ezri Konsa^{*} (HG, AT) (Note: Konsa graduated from Charlton Athletic academy.)	ENG	CB / RB (R)	23 Oct 1997 (age 29)	1.83 m (6 ft 0 in)	21 Aug 2026	(England) Aston Villa	£51.0m (initial fee)	2030+1	
33	Riccardo Calafiori	ITA	LB / CB / RB (L)	19 May 2002 (age 24)	1.88 m (6 ft 2 in)	29 Jul 2024	(Italy) Bologna	£33.6m (initial fee)	2029	
89	Marli Salmon	ENG	CB / RB (R)	29 Aug 2009 (age 17)	1.86 m (6 ft 1 in)	29 Aug 2026	(England) Arsenal Academy		(Note: Salmon is on the first year of a Scholarship.)	
Midfielders
8	Martin Ødegaard (Captain)	NOR	AM / CM (L)	17 Dec 1998 (age 27)	1.78 m (5 ft 10 in)	27 Jan 2021 (loan); 20 Aug 2021	(Spain) Real Madrid	£1.8m (loan) £30.0m	2028	
23	Mikel Merino	ESP	CM / AM / ST (L)	22 Jun 1996 (age 30)	1.89 m (6 ft 2 in)	27 Aug 2024	(Spain) Real Sociedad	£27.4m (initial fee)	2028+1	
36	Martín Zubimendi	ESP	DM / CM (R)	2 Feb 1999 (age 27)	1.81 m (5 ft 11 in)	6 Jul 2025	(Spain) Real Sociedad	£55.8m	2030	
39	Bruno Guimarães^{*}	BRA	DM / CM (R)	16 Nov 1997 (age 29)	1.82 m (6 ft 0 in)	8 Aug 2026	(England) Newcastle United	£75.0m	2030+1	
41	Declan Rice (HG, AT) (Note: Rice graduated from West Ham United's academy.)	ENG	CM / DM / CB (R)	14 Jan 1999 (age 27)	1.88 m (6 ft 2 in)	15 Jul 2023	(England) West Ham United	£100.0m (initial fee)	2028+1	
49	Myles Lewis-Skelly (HG, CT)	ENG	DM / LB (L)	26 Sep 2006 (age 20)	1.78 m (5 ft 10 in)	5 Oct 2023	(England) Arsenal Academy		2030	
Forwards
7	Bukayo Saka (Vice-captain) (HG, CT)	ENG	RW (L)	5 Sep 2001 (age 25)	1.78 m (5 ft 10 in)	14 Sep 2018	(England) Arsenal Academy		2030	
10	Eberechi Eze (HG, AT) (Note: Eze graduated from Millwall academy.)	ENG	AM / LW (R)	29 Jun 1998 (age 28)	1.78 m (5 ft 10 in)	23 Aug 2025	(England) Crystal Palace	£60.0m (initial fee)	2029+1	
14	Viktor Gyökeres	SWE	ST (R)	4 Jun 1998 (age 28)	1.87 m (6 ft 1 in)	26 Jul 2025	(Portugal) Sporting CP	£55.0m (initial fee)	2030	
17	Christos Tzolis^{*}	GRE	LW (R)	30 Jan 2002 (age 24)	1.79 m (5 ft 9 in)	23 Jul 2026	(Belgium) Club Brugge	£34.0m	2031	
20	Noni Madueke (HG, AT) (Note: Madueke graduated from Tottenham Hotspur's academy.)	ENG	RW / LW (L)	10 Mar 2002 (age 24)	1.82 m (6 ft 0 in)	18 Jul 2025	(England) Chelsea	£48.5m (initial fee)	2030	
29	Kai Havertz	GER	ST / AM (L)	11 Jun 1999 (age 27)	1.93 m (6 ft 4 in)	28 Jun 2023	(England) Chelsea	£62.0m (initial fee)	2028	
56	Max Dowman^{^} (HG, CT) (Note: Dowman is on the first year of a Scholarship.)	ENG	RW / AM (L)	31 Dec 2009 (age 16)	1.83 m (6 ft 0 in)		(England) Arsenal Academy			
Out on loan
22	Ethan Nwaneri (HG, CT)	ENG	AM / RW (L)	21 Mar 2007 (age 19)	1.76 m (5 ft 9 in)	28 Mar 2024	(England) Arsenal Academy		2030	
35	Tommy Setford	ENG	GK (R)	13 Mar 2006 (age 20)	1.85 m (6 ft 1 in)	21 Jul 2024	(Netherlands) Ajax	£0.8m	2028	

== Contracts and transfers ==
=== New contracts ===
The following Arsenal players signed their first or new professional contracts with the club.

Date	No.	Pos.	Player	Contract type	Ref.
Academy
15 Jul 2026	76	GK	(Poland) Remi Łupiński	First professional contract	
17 Jul 2026	52	DF	(England) Josh Ogunnaike	First professional contract	
26 Jul 2026	73	DF	(Scotland) Callan Hamill	First professional contract	
29 Aug 2026	89	DF	(England) Marli Salmon	First professional contract	
7 Sep 2026	93	DF	(England) Angelinou Pedro	First professional contract	
13 Nov 2026	84	GK	(England) Jack Talbot	First professional contract	

=== Released ===
The following players from Arsenal's first team, under-21s and under-18s squads were released by the club.

Note: Excludes players who joined Arsenal on loan in the previous season and returned to their parent clubs this season.

Date	No.	Pos.	Player	Subsequent club	Join date	Notes	Ref.
First team
27 Aug 2026	24	FW	(England) Reiss Nelson	(Netherlands) Feyenoord (Eredivisie)	2 Sep 2026	Contract termination	
Academy
30 Jun 2026	39	MF	(England) Harrison Dudziak	Unattached		End of contract	
30 Jun 2026	40	FW	(England) Sebastian Ferdinand	(England) Billericay Town (National League South)	13 November 2026	End of contract	
30 Jun 2026	42	DF	(Egypt) Cam'ron Ismail	Unattached		End of contract	
30 Jun 2026	48	DF	(England) Josh Nichols	(Croatia) Kustošija (First Football League)	1 July 2026	End of contract	
30 Jun 2026	51	GK	(Colombia) Alexéi Rojas	Penafiel (Liga Portugal 2)	18 July 2026	End of contract	
30 Jun 2026	54	DF	(Wales) William Lannin-Sweet	Unattached		End of contract	
30 Jun 2026	70	DF	(England) Samuel Chapman	(United States) Georgia Southern Eagles (Sun Belt Conference)	1 July 2026	End of contract	
30 Jun 2026	74	MF	(Wales) Alex Marciniak	(Poland) Cracovia (Ekstraklasa)	18 July 2026	End of contract	
30 Jun 2026	77	DF	(England) Samuel Onyekachukwu	Unattached		End of contract	
30 Jun 2026	96	FW	(England) Kyran Thompson	(England) Newcastle United (Premier League)	28 August 2026	End of contract	

=== Transfers in ===
The following players joined Arsenal permanently and signed professional contracts with the club.

Date	No.	Pos.	Player	Transferred from	Transfer fee	Contract ends	Ref.
First team
1 Jul 2026	5	DF	(Ecuador) Piero Hincapié	(Germany) Bayer Leverkusen (Bundesliga)	£34.5m	2031	
9 Jul 2026	30	GK	(France) Illan Meslier	Unattached (Note: Meslier departed Leeds United on 1 July 2026, upon the expiry of his contract.)	Free	2028+1	
23 Jul 2026	17	FW	(Greece) Christos Tzolis	(Belgium) Club Brugge (Pro League)	£34.0m	2031	
8 Aug 2026	39	MF	(Brazil) Bruno Guimarães	(England) Newcastle United (Premier League)	£75.0m	2030+1	
21 Aug 2026	15	DF	(England) Ezri Konsa	(England) Aston Villa (Premier League)	£51.0m + £4.0m	2030+1	
Academy
21 Jul 2026	57	DF	(England) Elijah Upson	(England) Tottenham Hotspur (Premier League)	Free	Undisclosed	
25 Aug 2026 (Note: Whilst Blayney's transfer was confirmed this season, he will join the club permanently at the beginning of the 2027–28 season.)	—	GK	(Northern Ireland) Phoenix Blayney	(Northern Ireland) Larne (Premiership)	Undisclosed	2028 (SC)	
28 Aug 2026	64	FW	(England) Igor Tyjon	(England) Blackburn Rovers (Championship)	£1.0m + £2.0m	Undisclosed	
29 Aug 2026	63	FW	(Gibraltar) James Scanlon	(England) Manchester United (Premier League)	Free	Undisclosed	
30 Aug 2026	62	DF	(England) Habeeb Ogunneye	(England) Manchester United (Premier League)	Free	Undisclosed	
30 Aug 2026	80	MF	(Wales) Axel Donczew	(Wales) Cardiff City (Championship)	£0.5m	2027 (SC)	
8 Sep 2026	—	FW	(England) Mylo Bernard	(England) Crystal Palace (Premier League)	Undisclosed	2027 (SC)	
11 Sep 2026 (Note: Whilst Bartishvili's transfer was confirmed this season, he will join the club permanently in July 2027.)	—	FW	(Georgia (country)) Andria Bartishvili	(Georgia (country)) Kolkheti Poti (Erovnuli Liga 2)	£3.9m	Undisclosed	
17 Sep 2026	—	FW	(England) Vincent Joseph	(England) Liverpool (Premier League)	Undisclosed	Undisclosed	

Total expenditure: ▼£199.9 million (excluding potential add-ons, bonuses, undisclosed figures and future transfers)

=== Transfers out ===
The following players departed Arsenal permanently and signed professional contracts with another club.

Date	No.	Pos.	Player	Transferred to	Transfer fee	Ref.
First team
1 Jul 2026 (Note: The transfer was announced on 23 May 2026, but was confirmed on 1 July 2026.)	31	GK	(Estonia) Karl Hein	(Germany) Werder Bremen (Bundesliga)	£2.6m	
1 Jul 2026	15	DF	(Poland) Jakub Kiwior	(Portugal) Porto (Primeira Liga)	£14.6m + £4.3m (Note: Arsenal will receive an additional £1.7m from any future transfer Kiwior makes.)	
15 Jul 2026	19	FW	(Belgium) Leandro Trossard	(Turkey) Beşiktaş (Süper Lig)	£15.4m + £1.6m	
5 Aug 2026	16	MF	(Denmark) Christian Nørgaard	(England) Everton (Premier League)	£7.0m	
1 Sep 2026	9	FW	(Brazil) Gabriel Jesus	(Spain) Barcelona (La Liga)	£8.6m + £3.9m	
1 Sep 2026	21	MF	(Portugal) Fábio Vieira	(Germany) Hamburg (Bundesliga)	£8.6m	
3 Sep 2026	11	FW	(Brazil) Gabriel Martinelli	(Saudi Arabia) Al Hilal (Pro League)	£60.0m	

Total income: ▲£116.8 million (excluding potential add-ons, bonuses and undisclosed figures)

=== Loans out ===
The following players departed Arsenal on loan and signed professional contracts with another club.

- Date^{‡} – Loan was originally scheduled to last to until end of the season but was curtailed.

Date	No.	Pos.	Player	Loaned to	On loan until	Loan fee	Ref.
First team
1 Sep 2026	22	MF	(England) Ethan Nwaneri	(Germany) Borussia Dortmund (Bundesliga)	End of Season	£4.3m	
1 Sep 2026	35	GK	(England) Tommy Setford	(England) Stevenage (League One)	End of Season	Free	
Academy
15 Aug 2026	46	FW	(Netherlands) Ismeal Kabia	(Scotland) St Mirren (Scottish Premiership)	End of Season	Free	
10 Nov 2026	42	GK	(England) Khari Ranson	(England) Billericay Town (National League South)	8 Dec 2026	Free	

Total income: ▲£4.3 million (excluding undisclosed figures)

=== Overall transfer activity ===
Note: All loan fees included. All potential add-ons, bonuses, undisclosed figures and future transfers excluded.

Transfer window	Spending	Income	Net expenditure
Summer 2026	▼£199.9 million	▲£123.5 million (Note: Through a sell-on clause, Arsenal received 20% of the total transfer fee paid by Hull City to Genoa for Brooke Norton-Cuffy (reportedly £2.4 million).)	▼£76.4 million
Winter 2027	£0.0 million	£0.0 million	£0.0 million
Total	▼£199.9 million	▲£123.5 million	▼£76.4 million

== Kits ==
Supplier: Adidas / Sponsor: Emirates / Sleeve sponsor: deel.

Outfield Kits
Home	Home alt.	Away	Away alt.^{1}	Away alt.^{2}	Third	Third alt.^{1}	Third alt.^{2}

Goalkeeper Kits
Goalkeeper^{1}	Goalkeeper^{2}	Goalkeeper^{3}	Goalkeeper^{4}	Goalkeeper^{5}	Goalkeeper^{6}

=== Kit information ===
This is Adidas's eighth year supplying Arsenal kit, having taken over from Puma at the beginning of the 2019–20 season.

- Home: The club revealed their new home kit for the 2026–27 season on 15 May 2026. The kit uses Arsenal's traditional colours of red and white. The shirt has a red body and white sleeves and is complemented by white shorts and red socks. Red shorts may be used in some away games when there will be a colour clash with the home team's kit. The shirt features subtle visual references to the Emirates Stadium to commemorate its 20 years as home of the club, including a bespoke collar inspired by the sweeping rooflines of the stadium. The kit was launched alongside a film named A Different Kind of Connection.
- Away: On 24 July, the Gunners released their new away kit, which reimagines the club's Bruised Banana away shirt worn between 1991 and 1993. The shirt features an engineered graphic inspired by the iconic geometric pattern, which, alongside the shorts and socks, are navy with coordinated red and yellow detailing. The shirt also features the adidas Trefoil logo, which was previously used on third kits. Yellow shorts and socks may be used in away games in which there are a colour clash with the home team's kit. A week after the launch of the kit, the club released a feature-length video that detailed the full story behind the Bruised Banana pattern of the past and how it was modernised for the present day.
- Third: On 3 August, the club released their new third kit, which is inspired by the "belief, ambition and creativity" that defines the club. In addition to featuring the club's iconic lightning graphic, for the first time in five seasons, the shirt has the yellow base colour synonymous with Arsenal, as well as navy and burgundy details across the entire kit. The shirt is complemented by navy shorts and socks, whereby yellow shorts and socks will be used in the away games in which there are a colour clash with the home team's kit. The kit was launched with an accompanying video named The Arsenal State of Mind.
- Goalkeeper: The new goalkeeper kits are based on Adidas's goalkeeper template for the season.

== Pre-season and friendlies ==
On 25 June, the club announced that their opening fixture of pre-season would be against Spanish side Girona, who they had previously faced in the UEFA Champions League in January 2025. Two months prior, the club confirmed that the squad would then travel to Ireland for the first time since August 2018 to face another Spanish side in Real Betis. The club then confirmed their final two pre-season fixtures in quick succession, with Borussia Dortmund named as the season's Emirates Cup opponents, followed by a home fixture against Como, who was managed by former Arsenal captain Cesc Fàbregas.

1 August 2026 Friendly	Girona	1–4	Arsenal	Girona, Spain
20:00 CEST	Martínez 50'; Moreno (yellow card) 54'	Report	Havertz 16'; Tzolis 30'; Dowman 53'; Gabriel Jesus 55'	Stadium: Estadi Montilivi; Attendance: 13,540; Referee: Marta Huerta de Aza

5 August 2026 Friendly	Arsenal	1–3	Real Betis	Dublin, Republic of Ireland
19:30 IST	Hincapié 32'; Salmon (yellow card) 61'	Report	Riquelme 9'; Deossa 26'; Fornals 43'	Stadium: Aviva Stadium; Attendance: 50,000; Referee: Robert Hennessy

9 August 2026 Emirates Cup	Arsenal	2–3 (5–4 p)	Borussia Dortmund	Holloway
14:00 BST	Gabriel (yellow card) 45'; Nwaneri 54'; Gyökeres 69' (pen.)	Report	Inácio 7'; Karetsas 29'; Gadou 58'	Stadium: Emirates Stadium; Attendance: 59,539; Referee: Chris Kavanagh
	Penalties
	Gabriel Jesus (penalty scored); Vieira (penalty scored); Hincapié (penalty scored); Martinelli (penalty scored); Nwaneri (penalty scored)		(penalty scored) Sabitzer; (penalty scored) Karetsas; (penalty scored) Yamamoto; (penalty missed) Albert; (penalty scored) Chukwuemeka

12 August 2026 Friendly	Arsenal	1–1 (4–3 p)	Como	Holloway
19:30 BST	Lewis-Skelly 33'	Report	Baturina 43'	Stadium: Emirates Stadium; Attendance: 45,000; Referee: Paul Tierney
	Penalties
	Ødegaard (penalty scored); Havertz (penalty scored); Bruno Guimarães (penalty scored); Madueke (penalty missed); Tzolis (penalty scored)		(penalty scored) Milla; (penalty scored) Caqueret; (penalty missed) Smolčić; (penalty scored) Rodríguez; (penalty missed) Morata

== Competitions ==
=== Overall record ===
Competition	First match	Last match	Starting round	Final position	Record							
Competition	First match	Last match	Starting round	Final position	Pld	W	D	L	GF	GA	GD	Win %
Premier League	21 August 2026	30 May 2027	Matchday 1	TBD	11	9	1	1	17	7	+10	81.82
FA Cup	8–11 January 2027	TBD	Third round	TBD	0	0	0	0	0	0	+0	—
EFL Cup	15 September 2026	27 October 2026	Third round	Fourth round	2	1	1	0	5	3	+2	50.00
FA Community Shield	16 August 2026		Final	Winners	1	1	0	0	3	0	+3	100.00
UEFA Champions League	9 September 2026	TBD	League phase	TBD	4	3	1	0	8	3	+5	75.00
Total					18	14	3	1	33	13	+20	77.78

Last updated: 21 November 2026
Source: Soccerway

=== FA Community Shield ===
Arsenal, as reigning Premier League champions, played Manchester City, the winners of the 2025–26 FA Cup. The fixture took place at the Millennium Stadium in Cardiff (which hosted the fixture between 2001 and 2006) instead of Wembley Stadium due to scheduling conflicts with a concert by the Weeknd.

16 August 2026 Final	Arsenal	3–0	Manchester City	Cardiff
15:00 BST	Calafiori 1', (yellow card) 38'; Havertz 28'; Ødegaard 48', (yellow card) 84'	Report	Foden (yellow card) 24'; Gvardiol (yellow card) 53'	Stadium: Millennium Stadium; Attendance: 58,056; Referee: Sam Barrott

=== Premier League ===
==== League table ====
Pos	Team	Pld	W	D	L	GF	GA	GD	Pts	Qualification or relegation
1	Arsenal	11	9	1	1	17	7	+10	28	Qualification for the Champions League league phase
2	Brighton & Hove Albion	11	7	1	3	26	9	+17	22	Qualification for the Champions League league phase
3	Manchester City	11	7	1	3	22	14	+8	22	Qualification for the Champions League league phase
4	Bournemouth	11	5	3	3	18	14	+4	18	Qualification for the Champions League league phase
5	Liverpool	10	5	3	2	14	10	+4	18	Qualification for the Europa League league phase (Note: The winners of the 2026–27 FA Cup and the 5th-placed team both qualify for the Europa League. If the FA Cup winners finish in the top five, the 6th-placed team will qualify. If England are one of the two associations with the highest UEFA coefficient points, 5th place will qualify for the Champions League and the other qualifying spots will move down one position.)

Updated to match(es) played on 22 November 2026. Source: Premier League
Rules for classification: 1) Points; 2) Goal difference; 3) Goals scored; 4) If the champions, relegated teams or qualified teams for UEFA competitions cannot be determined by rules 1 to 3 following the completion of the competition, rules 4.1 to 4.3 are applied between such teams – 4.1) Head-to-head points; 4.2) Head-to-head away goals; 4.3) Play-off at a neutral site.

==== Results summary ====
Overall								Home						Away					
Pld	W	D	L	GF	GA	GD	Pts	W	D	L	GF	GA	GD	W	D	L	GF	GA	GD
11	9	1	1	17	7	+10	28	5	0	0	10	2	+8	4	1	1	7	5	+2

Last updated: 21 November 2026.
Source: Premier League

==== Results by round ====
Round	1	2	3	4	5	6	7	8	9	10	11	12	13	14	15	16	17	18	19	20	21	22	23	24	25	26	27	28	29	30	31	32	33	34	35	36	37	38
Ground	H	A	H	A	A	H	A	H	A	H	A	H	A	A	H	H	A	A	H	H	A	H	A	H	A	H	A	H	A	H	A	H	A	H	A	H	A	H
Result	W	W	W	W	L	W	W	W	W	W	D																											
Position	2	2	2	1	2	2	2	2	1	1	1	1																										
Points	3	6	9	12	12	15	18	21	24	27	28																											

Updated to match(es) played on 21 November 2026. Source: Premier League
A = Away; H = Home; W = Win; D = Draw; L = Loss; P = Postponed

==== Matches ====
The league fixtures were released on 19 June 2026.

Win Draw Loss Fixtures

21 August 2026 1	Arsenal	3–0	Coventry City	Holloway
20:00 BST	Havertz 15'; Saka 23'; Gabriel (yellow card) 34'; Ødegaard 49'	Report	Yirenkyi (yellow card) 27'	Stadium: Emirates Stadium; Attendance: 60,098; Referee: Thomas Bramall; Man of the Match: Martin Ødegaard

31 August 2026 2	Aston Villa	0–1	Arsenal	Birmingham
20:00 BST	Alysson (yellow card) 80'; McGinn (yellow card) 81'; Maatsen (yellow card) 90+6'	Report	Tzolis (yellow card) 29'; Saka 59'	Stadium: Villa Park; Attendance: 36,804; Referee: Jarred Gillett; Man of the Match: Riccardo Calafiori

6 September 2026 3	Arsenal	2–1	Chelsea	Holloway
16:30 BST	Havertz 25'; Ødegaard 50'; Tzolis (yellow card) 58'; Merino (yellow card) 90+5'	Report	Rogers 2', (yellow card) 83'; João Pedro (yellow card) 14'; Palmer (yellow card) 45'; Lacroix (yellow card) 58'	Stadium: Emirates Stadium; Attendance: 60,240; Referee: Chris Kavanagh; Man of the Match: Martin Ødegaard

12 September 2026 4	Sunderland	0–2	Arsenal	Sunderland
20:00 BST	Mandava (yellow card) 28' (yellow-red card) 90+6'; Le Fée (penalty missed) 56'; Ballard (yellow card) 66'; Xhaka (yellow card) 69'; Brobbey (yellow card) 81'; Mukiele (yellow card) 90+1'	Report	Bruno Guimarães 58'; Gabriel (yellow card) 90+1'; Havertz (yellow card) 90+3'; Saka 90+7' (pen.)	Stadium: Stadium of Light; Attendance: 48,707; Referee: John Brooks; Man of the Match: David Raya

19 September 2026 5	Brighton & Hove Albion	3–0	Arsenal	Brighton and Hove
15:00 BST	Groß 31'; Kostoulas (yellow card) 33', (goal) 45'; Kadıoğlu (yellow card) 45+1'; Andrés 57'; Struijk (yellow card) 71'; De Cuyper (yellow card) 90+1'	Report	Rice (yellow card) 90+7'	Stadium: Falmer Stadium; Attendance: 31,944; Referee: Darren England; Man of the Match: Pascal Groß

10 October 2026 6	Arsenal	2–1	Leeds United	Holloway
12:30 BST	Calafiori 62'; Bruno Guimarães 70'; Ødegaard (yellow card) 84'	Report	Tanaka (yellow card) 36'; Ampadu (yellow card) 38'; Justin 55', (yellow card) 78'; Muharemović (yellow card) 59'	Stadium: Emirates Stadium; Attendance: 60,315; Referee: Paul Tierney; Man of the Match: Riccardo Calafiori

18 October 2026 7	Nottingham Forest	0–1	Arsenal	West Bridgford
16:30 BST	Williams (yellow card) 17'	Report	Madueke (yellow card) 53', (goal) 80'	Stadium: City Ground; Attendance: 30,893; Referee: Michael Oliver; Man of the Match: Noni Madueke

24 October 2026 8	Arsenal	2–0	Everton	Holloway
15:00 BST	Konsa 7'; Lewis-Skelly (yellow card) 58'; Gabriel 68'	Report	Mykolenko (yellow card) 45+2'; Garner (yellow card) 66'; Tarkowski (yellow card) 79'	Stadium: Emirates Stadium; Attendance: 60,207; Referee: Tony Harrington; Man of the Match: Gabriel Magalhães

1 November 2026 9	Liverpool	0–1	Arsenal	Liverpool
16:30 GMT	Barcola (yellow card) 45+3'; Kerkez (yellow card) 67'; Mac Allister (yellow card) 80'; Van Dijk (yellow card) 90+7'	Report	Havertz 16'; Madueke (yellow card) 55'; Lewis-Skelly (yellow card) 72'; Timber (yellow card) 80'; Raya (yellow card) 90+3'	Stadium: Anfield; Attendance: 60,406; Referee: Andy Madley; Man of the Match: Declan Rice

7 November 2026 10	Arsenal	1–0	Hull City	Holloway
15:00 GMT	Ødegaard 72'	Report	Coyle (yellow card) 34'; Gourna-Douath (yellow card) 48'; Norton-Cuffy (yellow card) 61'; Stroud (yellow card) 75'; Mendy (yellow card) 87'	Stadium: Emirates Stadium; Attendance: 60,285; Referee: Farai Hallam; Man of the Match: Martin Ødegaard

21 November 2026 11	Newcastle United	2–2	Arsenal	Newcastle upon Tyne
17:30 GMT	Dedić (yellow card) 23'; Barnes 49', (yellow card) 58'; Thiaw 62'; Burn (yellow card) 81'	Report	Eze 33'; Rice (yellow card) 56'; Madueke 78', (yellow card) 81'; Gyökeres (yellow card) 90+10'	Stadium: St James' Park; Attendance: 52,661; Referee: Chris Kavanagh; Man of the Match: Noni Madueke

29 November 2026 12	Arsenal	v	Manchester City	Holloway
16:30 GMT		Report		Stadium: Emirates Stadium

2 December 2026 13	Brentford	v	Arsenal	Brentford
20:15 GMT		Report		Stadium: Brentford Community Stadium

6 December 2026 14	Tottenham Hotspur	v	Arsenal	Tottenham
16:30 GMT		Report		Stadium: Tottenham Hotspur Stadium

13 December 2026 15	Arsenal	v	Bournemouth	Holloway
14:00 GMT		Report		Stadium: Emirates Stadium

20 December 2026 16	Arsenal	v	Manchester United	Holloway
16:30 GMT		Report		Stadium: Emirates Stadium

27 December 2026 17	Crystal Palace	v	Arsenal	Selhurst
19:00 GMT		Report		Stadium: Selhurst Park

30 December 2026 18	Fulham	v	Arsenal	Fulham
19:30 GMT		Report		Stadium: Craven Cottage

2 January 2027 19	Arsenal	v	Ipswich Town	Holloway
15:00 GMT		Report		Stadium: Emirates Stadium

5 January 2027 20	Arsenal	v	Brentford	Holloway
19:30 GMT		Report		Stadium: Emirates Stadium

16 January 2027 21	Hull City	v	Arsenal	Kingston upon Hull
TBC GMT		Report		Stadium: MKM Stadium

23 January 2027 22	Arsenal	v	Newcastle United	Holloway
TBC GMT		Report		Stadium: Emirates Stadium

30 January 2027 23	Manchester City	v	Arsenal	Manchester
TBC GMT		Report		Stadium: City of Manchester Stadium

6 February 2027 24	Arsenal	v	Liverpool	Holloway
TBC GMT		Report		Stadium: Emirates Stadium

10 February 2027 25	Ipswich Town	v	Arsenal	Ipswich
TBC GMT		Report		Stadium: Portman Road

20 February 2027 26	Arsenal	v	Fulham	Holloway
TBC GMT		Report		Stadium: Emirates Stadium

27 February 2027 27	Manchester United	v	Arsenal	Trafford
TBC GMT		Report		Stadium: Old Trafford

3 March 2027 28	Arsenal	v	Crystal Palace	Holloway
TBC GMT		Report		Stadium: Emirates Stadium

13 March 2027 29	Chelsea	v	Arsenal	Fulham
TBC GMT		Report		Stadium: Stamford Bridge

20 March 2027 30	Arsenal	v	Sunderland	Holloway
TBC GMT		Report		Stadium: Emirates Stadium

10 April 2027 31	Coventry City	v	Arsenal	Coventry
TBC BST		Report		Stadium: Coventry Building Society Arena

17 April 2027 32	Arsenal	v	Aston Villa	Holloway
TBC BST		Report		Stadium: Emirates Stadium

24 April 2027 33	Bournemouth	v	Arsenal	Bournemouth
TBC BST		Report		Stadium: Dean Court

1 May 2027 34	Arsenal	v	Tottenham Hotspur	Holloway
TBC BST		Report		Stadium: Emirates Stadium

8 May 2027 35	Leeds United	v	Arsenal	Leeds
TBC BST		Report		Stadium: Elland Road

15 May 2027 36	Arsenal	v	Nottingham Forest	Holloway
TBC BST		Report		Stadium: Emirates Stadium

23 May 2027 37	Everton	v	Arsenal	Liverpool
TBC BST		Report		Stadium: Hill Dickinson Stadium

30 May 2027 38	Arsenal	v	Brighton & Hove Albion	Holloway
16:00 BST		Report		Stadium: Emirates Stadium

=== FA Cup ===
As a Premier League side, Arsenal enter the FA Cup in the third round.

8–11 January 2027 3rd Round	v
--:-- GMT	Report

=== EFL Cup ===
The Gunners entered the EFL Cup in the third round as one of the Premier League teams participating in UEFA competitions. As a seeded team, they were drawn away to newly-promoted Premier League side Ipswich Town. They were then drawn another away tie to face League Two side Fleetwood Town for the first time in the club's history, in the fourth round.

15 September 2026 3rd Round	Ipswich Town	2–4	Arsenal	Ipswich
20:00 BST	McAteer (yellow card) 34'; Mehmeti 62'; Núñez (yellow card) 87'; Akpom 90+1'	Report	Dowman 7', 47'; Madueke 16'; Merino 58'	Stadium: Portman Road; Attendance: 28,966; Referee: Peter Bankes

27 October 2026 4th Round	Fleetwood Town	1–1 (5–3 p)	Arsenal	Fleetwood
20:00 BST	Loupalo-Bi 21'; McLean (yellow card) 54'; Batty (yellow card) 74'; Cannon (yellow card) 86'	Report	Gyökeres 50'; Dowman (red card) 85'	Stadium: Highbury Stadium; Attendance: 5,002; Referee: Michael Salisbury
	Penalties
	Coughlan (penalty scored); Neal (penalty scored); Davies (penalty scored); Cannon (penalty scored); Haughey (penalty scored)		(penalty scored) Ødegaard; (penalty scored) Havertz; (penalty scored) Gyökeres; (penalty missed) Bruno Guimarães

=== UEFA Champions League ===
As the champions of the Premier League, Arsenal entered the UEFA Champions League in the league phase.

==== League phase ====
Arsenal's UEFA club coefficient was 119.000 points at the end of the previous campaign. They were in Pot 1 for the league phase draw, which was held on 27 August 2026. Arsenal were randomly drawn to play Real Madrid and Bayern Munich (for the second consecutive season) from Pot 1, Borussia Dortmund and Real Betis from Pot 2, Lille and Napoli from Pot 3, and finally debutant Sabah and Slavia Prague from Pot 4.

===== League phase table =====
Pos	Team	Pld	W	D	L	GF	GA	GD	Pts	Qualification
1	(France) Paris Saint-Germain	4	4	0	0	20	5	+15	12	Advance to round of 16 (seeded)
2	(Spain) Real Madrid	4	4	0	0	13	7	+6	12	Advance to round of 16 (seeded)
3	(England) Arsenal	4	3	1	0	8	3	+5	10	Advance to round of 16 (seeded)
4	(Italy) Como	4	3	0	1	19	6	+13	9	Advance to round of 16 (seeded)
5	(Spain) Barcelona	4	3	0	1	14	6	+8	9	Advance to round of 16 (seeded)

Updated to match(es) played on 4 November 2026. Source: UEFA
Rules for classification: League phase tiebreakers

===== Results summary =====
Overall								Home						Away					
Pld	W	D	L	GF	GA	GD	Pts	W	D	L	GF	GA	GD	W	D	L	GF	GA	GD
4	3	1	0	8	3	+5	10	1	0	0	3	0	+3	2	1	0	5	3	+2

Last updated: 4 November 2026.
Source: UEFA

===== Results by round =====
Round	1	2	3	4	5	6	7	8
Ground	A	H	A	A	H	H	A	H
Result	W	W	D	W				
Position	15	7	7	3				
Points	3	6	7	10				

Updated to match(es) played on 4 November 2026. Source: UEFA
A = Away; H = Home; W = Win; D = Draw; L = Loss; P = Postponed

===== Matches =====
Win Draw Loss Fixtures

9 September 2026 1	Napoli (Italy)	0–1	(England) Arsenal	Naples, Italy
21:00 CEST (20:00 BST)	Gilmour (yellow card) 42'; Lucca (yellow card) 85'	Report	Ødegaard 75', (yellow card) 90+1'	Stadium: Stadio Diego Armando Maradona; Attendance: 44,083; Referee: Glenn Nyberg (Sweden); Man of the Match: Martin Ødegaard

13 October 2026 2	Arsenal (England)	3–0	(France) Lille	London, England
20:00 BST	Merino (yellow card) 29'; Timber 64'; Eze 67'; Saka 71'; Havertz (yellow card) 90+2'	Report	Goffi (yellow card) 81'	Stadium: Emirates Stadium; Attendance: 57,024; Referee: Felix Zwayer (Germany); Man of the Match: Jurriën Timber

21 October 2026 3	Bayern Munich (Germany)	2–2	(England) Arsenal	Munich, Germany
21:00 CEST (20:00 BST)	Davies 35'; Kane 61' (pen.)	Report	Havertz (yellow card) 13'; Eze 25'; Konsa (yellow card) 39'; Rice 82'	Stadium: Allianz Arena; Attendance: 75,000; Referee: Davide Massa (Italy); Man of the Match: Harry Kane

4 November 2026 4	Slavia Prague (Czech Republic)	1–2	(England) Arsenal	Prague, Czech Republic
21:00 CET (20:00 GMT)	Moses (yellow card) 20'; Nowak 90'	Report	Madueke 9'; Gyökeres 38'; Konsa (yellow card) 53'; Rice (yellow card) 68'	Stadium: Fortuna Arena; Attendance: 19,308; Referee: Tobias Stieler (Germany); Man of the Match: Viktor Gyökeres

24 November 2026 5	Arsenal (England)	v	(Germany) Borussia Dortmund	London, England
20:00 GMT		Report		Stadium: Emirates Stadium

9 December 2026 6	Arsenal (England)	v	(Spain) Real Madrid	London, England
20:00 GMT		Report		Stadium: Emirates Stadium

20 January 2027 7	Real Betis (Spain)	v	(England) Arsenal	Seville, Spain
21:00 CET (20:00 GMT)		Report		Stadium: La Cartuja
Note: Due to renovation works at Benito Villamarín, the regular home of Real Betis, the match will instead be played at La Cartuja in Seville.

27 January 2027 8	Arsenal (England)	v	(Azerbaijan) Sabah	London, England
20:00 GMT		Report		Stadium: Emirates Stadium

== Statistics ==
Keys
Final score	The score at full time; Arsenal's listed first.	(N)	The game was played at a neutral site.
(H)	Arsenal were the home team.	(A)	Arsenal were the away team.
Opponent	The opponent team without a flag is English.		
Player^{*}	Player who joined Arsenal permanently or on loan during the season		
Player^{†}	Player who departed Arsenal permanently or on loan during the season		
Player^{^}	Arsenal U21s or U18s player who appeared for the first team during the season		

=== Appearances ===
The following 27 players made appearances for Arsenal's first team in all competitions during the season.

As of match played 7 November 2026

2026–27 season
Squad number	Heritage number	Pos.	Player	Premier League	FA Cup	EFL Cup	Champions League	Community Shield	Season total	Career Club Total	Ref.
1	901	GK	(Spain) David Raya	10	0	0	4	1	15	162	
3	919	DF	(Spain) Cristhian Mosquera	2	0	1	0+1	1	5	40	
4	882	DF	(England) Ben White	7	0	0+1	2+1	1	12	202	
5	922	DF	(Ecuador) Piero Hincapié^{*}	0+5	0	1	2	0+1	9	48	
6	872	DF	(Brazil) Gabriel Magalhães	10	0	1	4	1	16	277	
7	862	FW	(England) Bukayo Saka	7	0	0	2+1	0+1	11	323	
8	879	MF	(Norway) Martin Ødegaard	10	0	0+2	2+2	1	17	251	
10	920	MF	(England) Eberechi Eze	2+5	0	1+1	3+1	0+1	14	66	
12	899	DF	(Netherlands) Jurriën Timber	3+3	0	1	2+1	0	10	105	
13	923	GK	(Spain) Kepa Arrizabalaga	0	0	1	0	0	1	13	
14	916	FW	(Sweden) Viktor Gyökeres	1+6	0	2	3+1	0+1	14	69	
15	931	DF	(England) Ezri Konsa^{*}	8+1	0	0+2	4	0	15	15	
17	929	FW	(Greece) Christos Tzolis^{*}	7	0	0+1	0+2	1	11	11	
20	917	FW	(England) Noni Madueke	4+3	0	1	3+1	1	13	56	
23	910	MF	(Spain) Mikel Merino	1+9	0	1	3+1	0	15	93	
29	898	FW	(Germany) Kai Havertz	9+1	0	1	1+2	1	15	126	
30	933	GK	(France) Illan Meslier^{*}	0	0	1	0	0	1	1	
33	903	DF	(Italy) Riccardo Calafiori	9+1	0	0	1	1	12	77	
36	915	MF	(Spain) Martín Zubimendi	0+7	0	2	1+1	0+1	12	69	
39	930	MF	(Brazil) Bruno Guimarães^{*}	4+4	0	1+1	2+1	1	14	14	
41	900	MF	(England) Declan Rice	10	0	0	4	0+1	15	173	
44	927	MF	(England) Ife Ibrahim^{^}	0	0	0+1	0	0	1	2	
45	932	MF	(England) Theo Julienne^{^}	0	0	0+1	0	0	1	1	
49	905	DF	(England) Myles Lewis-Skelly	6+1	0	2	1+1	1	12	87	
53	934	FW	(Northern Ireland) Ceadach O'Neill	0	0	1	0	0	1	1	
56	918	FW	(England) Max Dowman	0+2	0	2	0+2	0	6	19	
89	925	DF	(England) Marli Salmon	0	0	2	0	0	2	6	

=== Goals ===
Arsenal have scored 33 goals during the season.

The following 14 players have scored in all competitions during the season.

As of match played 21 November 2026

2026–27 season
Rk.	No.	Pos.	Player	Premier League	FA Cup	EFL Cup	Champions League	Community Shield	Season total	Career club total
1	8	MF	(Norway) Martin Ødegaard	3	0	0	1	1	5	47
2	7	FW	(England) Bukayo Saka	3	0	0	1	0	4	85
2	20	FW	(England) Noni Madueke	2	0	1	1	0	4	12
2	29	FW	(Germany) Kai Havertz	3	0	0	0	1	4	40
5	10	MF	(England) Eberechi Eze	1	0	0	2	0	3	13
6	14	FW	(Sweden) Viktor Gyökeres	0	0	1	1	0	2	23
6	33	DF	(Italy) Riccardo Calafiori	1	0	0	0	1	2	6
6	39	MF	(Brazil) Bruno Guimarães^{*}	2	0	0	0	0	2	2
6	56	FW	(England) Max Dowman^{^}	0	0	2	0	0	2	3
10	6	DF	(Brazil) Gabriel Magalhães	1	0	0	0	0	1	25
10	15	DF	(England) Ezri Konsa^{*}	1	0	0	0	0	1	1
10	12	DF	(Netherlands) Jurrien Timber	0	0	0	1	0	1	7
10	23	MF	(Spain) Mikel Merino	0	0	1	0	0	1	16
10	41	MF	(England) Declan Rice	0	0	0	1	0	1	22
Total				17	0	5	8	3	33	

=== Assists ===
The following 13 players have provided 27 assists in all competitions this season.

As of match played 21 November 2026

2026–27 season
Rk.	No.	Pos.	Player	Premier League	FA Cup	EFL Cup	Champions League	Community Shield	Season total	Career club total
1	41	MF	(England) Declan Rice	5	0	0	0	0	5	33
2	17	FW	(Greece) Christos Tzolis^{*}	1	0	0	1	2	4	4
3	4	DF	(England) Ben White	3	0	0	0	0	3	17
3	14	FW	(Sweden) Viktor Gyökeres	1	0	0	2	0	3	6
5	33	DF	(Italy) Riccardo Calafiori	2	0	0	0	0	2	7
5	8	MF	(Norway) Martin Ødegaard	1	0	0	1	0	2	45
5	29	FW	(Germany) Kai Havertz	1	0	0	1	0	2	18
8	7	FW	(England) Bukayo Saka	0	0	0	1	0	1	72
8	10	MF	(England) Eberechi Eze	0	0	1	0	0	1	6
8	20	FW	(England) Noni Madueke	0	0	0	1	0	1	4
8	23	MF	(Spain) Mikel Merino	0	0	0	1	0	1	9
8	36	MF	(Spain) Martín Zubimendi	0	0	1	0	0	1	4
8	49	MF	(England) Myles Lewis-Skelly	0	0	0	0	1	1	6
Total				14	0	2	8	3	27	

=== Disciplinary record ===
Includes all competitions for senior team. The list is sorted by red cards, then yellow cards (and by squad number when total cards are equal). Players with no cards are not included in the list.

As of match played 4 November 2026

Rk.	No.	Pos.	Player	Premier League			FA Cup			EFL Cup			Champions League			Community Shield			Total			Ref.
Rk.	No.	Pos.	Player	Yellow card	Second yellow card	Red card	Yellow card	Second yellow card	Red card	Yellow card	Second yellow card	Red card	Yellow card	Second yellow card	Red card	Yellow card	Second yellow card	Red card	Yellow card	Second yellow card	Red card	Ref.
1	56	FW	(England) Max Dowman^{^}	0	0	0	0	0	0	0	0	1	0	0	0	0	0	0	0	0	1	
2	8	MF	(Norway) Martin Ødegaard	1	0	0	0	0	0	0	0	0	1	0	0	1	0	0	3	0	0	
2	29	FW	(Germany) Kai Havertz	1	0	0	0	0	0	0	0	0	2	0	0	0	0	0	3	0	0	
4	6	DF	(Brazil) Gabriel Magalhães	2	0	0	0	0	0	0	0	0	0	0	0	0	0	0	2	0	0	
4	15	DF	(England) Ezri Konsa	0	0	0	0	0	0	0	0	0	2	0	0	0	0	0	2	0	0	
4	17	FW	(Greece) Christos Tzolis^{*}	2	0	0	0	0	0	0	0	0	0	0	0	0	0	0	2	0	0	
4	20	FW	(England) Noni Madueke	2	0	0	0	0	0	0	0	0	0	0	0	0	0	0	2	0	0	
4	23	MF	(Spain) Mikel Merino	1	0	0	0	0	0	0	0	0	1	0	0	0	0	0	2	0	0	
4	41	MF	(England) Declan Rice	1	0	0	0	0	0	0	0	0	1	0	0	0	0	0	2	0	0	
4	49	MF	(England) Myles Lewis-Skelly	2	0	0	0	0	0	0	0	0	0	0	0	0	0	0	2	0	0	
11	1	GK	(Spain) David Raya	1	0	0	0	0	0	0	0	0	0	0	0	0	0	0	1	0	0	
11	12	DF	(Netherlands) Jurrien Timber	1	0	0	0	0	0	0	0	0	0	0	0	0	0	0	1	0	0	
11	33	DF	(Italy) Riccardo Calafiori	0	0	0	0	0	0	0	0	0	0	0	0	1	0	0	1	0	0	
	Total				16	0	0	0	0	0	0	0	1	7	0	0	2	0	0			

=== Clean sheets ===
Includes all competitions for senior team. The list is sorted by squad number when season-total clean sheets are equal. Numbers in square brackets represent games where both goalkeepers participated and both kept a clean sheet; the number in square brackets is awarded to the goalkeeper who was substituted on, whilst a full clean sheet is awarded to the goalkeeper who was on the field at the start of play. Goalkeepers with no appearances not included in the list.

As of match played 7 November 2026

2026–27 season										Career club total	Ref.
Rk.	No.	Goalkeeper	Premier League	FA Cup	EFL Cup	Champions League	Community Shield	Season total	Season percentage	Career club total	Ref.
1	1	(Spain) David Raya	7	0	0	2	1	10	67% (10/15)	76	
2	13	(Spain) Kepa Arrizabalaga	0	0	0	0	0	0	0% (0/1)	4	
2	30	(France) Illan Meslier	0	0	0	0	0	0	0% (0/1)	0	
Total			7	0	0	2	1	10	56% (10/17)		

== Awards and nominations ==
Keys
M	Matches	W	Won	D	Drawn	L	Lost
Pts	Points	GF	Goals for	GA	Goals against	GD	Goal difference
Pos.	Position	Pld	Played	G	Goals	A	Assists
CS	Clean sheets (for defenders and goalkeepers)			S	Saves (for goalkeepers)		
Final score	The score at full time; Arsenal's listed first.			(N)	The game was played at a neutral site.		
(H)	Arsenal were the home team.			(A)	Arsenal were the away team.		
Opponent	The opponent team without a flag is English.						
Player^{*}	Player who joined Arsenal permanently or on loan during the season						
Player^{†}	Player who departed Arsenal permanently or on loan during the season						
Player^{^}	Player who was registered as an Arsenal U21 or U18 player during the season						

=== Monthly awards ===
==== Arsenal Player of the Month ====
The winner of the award was chosen from players across the men's, women's and academy teams via a poll on the club's official website. Only winners from the men's team are listed.

Month	Pos.	Player	Pld	G	A	CS	Votes	Ref.
August 2026	DF	(Italy) Riccardo Calafiori	2	0	2	2	74%	
September 2026	MF	(Norway) Martin Odegaard	5	2	0	0	65%	

==== Premier League Manager of the Month ====
The winner of the award was chosen by a combination of an online public vote and a panel of experts.

As of August 2026, Mikel Arteta is the joint-6th most awarded manager in Premier League history.

Month	Manager	M	W	D	L	GF	GA	GD	Pts	Pos	Result	Ref.
August 2026	(Spain) Mikel Arteta	2	2	0	0	4	0	+4	6	2nd	Nominated	
October 2026	(Spain) Mikel Arteta	3	3	0	0	5	1	+4	9	2nd	Nominated	

==== Premier League Player of the Month ====
The winner of the award was chosen by a combination of an online public vote, a panel of experts, and the captain of each Premier League club.

Month	Pos.	Player	Pld	G	A	CS	S	Result	Ref.
August 2026	DF	(Italy) Riccardo Calafiori	2	0	2	2	–	Nominated	
October 2026	DF	(England) Ezri Konsa	3	1	0	2	–	Nominated	
October 2026	MF	(England) Declan Rice	3	0	2	–	–	Nominated	

==== Premier League Goal of the Month ====
The winner of the award was chosen by a combination of an online public vote and a panel of experts.

- Score – The score at the time of the goal. Arsenal's score listed first.

Month	Pos.	Player	Score	Final score	Opponent	Result	Ref.
September	MF	(Brazil) Bruno Guimarães	1–0	2–0	v. Sunderland	Nominated	

==== Premier League Save of the Month ====
The winner of the award was chosen by a combination of an online public vote and a panel of experts.

- Score – The score at the time of the save. Arsenal's score listed first.

Month	Goalkeeper	Score	Final score	Opponent	Shot taker	Result	Ref.
September	(Spain) David Raya	2–1	2–1	v. Chelsea	(Brazil) Estevao	Nominated	
September	(Spain) David Raya	0–0	2–0	v. Sunderland	(France) Enzo Le Fée	Won	
