= Max Dowman =

English footballer (born 2009)

- Dowman in 2026

Personal information
- Full name: Max Robert Dowman
- Date of birth: 31 December 2009 (age 16)
- Place of birth: Chelmsford, England
- Height: 6 ft 0 in (1.83 m)
- Positions: Attacking midfielder; winger

Team information
- Current team: Arsenal
- Number: 56

Youth career
- Billericay Town
- 2015–: Arsenal

Senior career*
| Years | Team | Apps | (Gls) |
| 2025– | Arsenal | 8 | (1) |

International career^{‡}
| 2024 | England U16 | 5 | (0) |
| 2024– | England U17 | 16 | (5) |
| 2025– | England U19 | 13 | (3) |
| 2026– | England U21 | 2 | (1) |
- * Club domestic league appearances and goals as of 20:56, 24 October 2026 (UTC) ‡ National team caps and goals as of 01:32, 17 November 2026 (UTC)

Max Robert Dowman (born 31 December 2009) is an English professional footballer who plays as an attacking midfielder or a winger for Premier League club Arsenal.

Born in Chelmsford, Dowman began his youth career at local club Billericay Town before a move to Arsenal's Academy at the age of five. On 14 March 2026, six months after making his competitive debut for Arsenal, he became the youngest goalscorer in Premier League history at 16 years and 73 days old through a goal against Everton. Dowman also became the youngest player to win the Premier League at 16 years and 139 days old after Arsenal won the 2025–26 season.

Dowman has represented England at youth level since 2024, becoming the youngest-ever goalscorer for the under-19s on 15 November 2025, and then the youngest to score for the under-21s on 16 November 2026.

== Early life ==
Max Robert Dowman was born on 31 December 2009 in Chelmsford, Essex. He grew up in a family of Arsenal supporters. He is distantly related to George Male who played for Arsenal either side of the Second World War: Male's two-times great-grandfather is also Dowman's four-times great-grandfather.

== Club career ==
Dowman joined the youth academy of Arsenal in 2015, following time in the youth set-up at Billericay Town. He started playing with their Arsenal U18s in September 2023 at the age of 13. On 19 September 2024, he scored in the Arsenal U19's UEFA Youth League match against Atalanta at the age of 14 years, eight months, and 19 days. He therefore became the youngest goal-scorer in the competition's history. In December 2024, after becoming the youngest ever Premier League 2 player at 14 years old, he began training with the first team.

=== 2025–present: Debut season ===
On 23 July 2025, Dowman made his first-team debut in a pre-season friendly against AC Milan aged 15 years old in Singapore. On 23 August, he made his Premier League debut, coming on as a substitute for Arsenal in the 64th minute of their match against Leeds United, becoming the second youngest player in the league's history at 15 years and 235 days, behind only his teammate, Ethan Nwaneri. He won a penalty for his team in the third minute of stoppage time, helping Arsenal score their fifth goal in a 5–0 victory over Leeds United. Owing to his age, he is obliged to be chaperoned whilst with the team and is not allowed to change in the main dressing room under FA safeguarding regulations.

On 29 October 2025, Dowman became Arsenal's youngest ever starter when he was named in the starting XI for the fourth round of the EFL Cup against Brighton & Hove Albion at the Emirates Stadium, aged 15 years and 302 days, breaking the previous club record set by goalkeeper Jack Porter (16 years and 72 days). He played approximately 71 minutes before being substituted for Bukayo Saka, as Arsenal secured a 2–0 victory to advance to the quarter‑finals. During the match, Dowman was commended for his dribbling, courage and composure, drawing praise from manager Mikel Arteta who noted that "For him, everything is natural, for him everything is OK. It is the way he plays. That's the secret, that he doesn't make a big fuss of it. He just does what he does best which is to play football with a lot of courage and determination."

On 4 November 2025, Dowman appeared as a 72nd-minute substitute during Arsenal's 3–0 away victory against Slavia Prague in the league phase of the 2025–26 UEFA Champions League, becoming the youngest player to appear in the competition at 15 years and 308 days old, surpassing the previous record set by Youssoufa Moukoko who was 16 years and 18 days old when he made his Champions League debut. On 30 January 2026, Arsenal announced that Dowman had signed a pre-contract agreement with the club that would lead to him signing professional terms when he turns 17. On 14 March, Dowman came on as a substitute for Martín Zubimendi and scored in the 97th minute during Arsenal's 2–0 home victory against Everton to become the youngest goalscorer in both the Premier League and the club's history. He achieved this feat at 16 years and 73 days old, breaking the previous record held by James Vaughan from 2005.

On 19 May 2026, Dowman became the youngest Premier League winner ever, aged 16 years and 139 days old, surpassing the previous record of Phil Foden. On 24 May 2026, during the final match of the 2025–26 Premier League season between Arsenal and Crystal Palace, he became the youngest starting player in the league's history, at 16 years and 144 days old. He benefited from extensive squad rotation implemented by Mikel Arteta prior to the Champions League final, with Arsenal having already secured first place in the league.

On 27 October 2026, Dowman received the first red card of his senior career, following a brawl with Harrison Neal, in the 85th minute of Arsenal's EFL Cup tie with Fleetwood Town.

== International career ==
Dowman featured as a starter in all three of England's games at the 2025 UEFA European Under-17 Championship, including a 4–2 win against the Czech Republic, where he scored the opening goal.

Dowman made his England under-19 debut during a 2–0 win over Ukraine at Pinatar Arena on 3 September 2025. Dowman became the youngest-ever goalscorer for the England U19 side, beating Ryan Sessegnon's record from 2016, in a 7–0 win against Wales.

In November 2026, Dowman was selected for the England U21 squad and on 13 November he became the youngest player to ever represent the side when he came on as a substitute during their defeat against Portugal at Ashton Gate. Three days later he started against France and became the youngest goalscorer for England at this age level with a late winner in their 3–2 victory.

== Style of play ==
Comfortable playing in a number of positions, Dowman has been used as an attacking midfielder and as a traditional '10' for Arsenal's youth teams, but can also play as a right winger. He has been described as "skillful, energetic and naturally gifted in the final third". Technically, Dowman's set-piece delivery stands out. He has been entrusted with corner and free-kick duties at youth level. Arsenal youth team coach Gustavo Oliveira labelled Dowman the "next Kaká".

== Career statistics ==
As of match played 4 November 2026

Appearances and goals by club, season and competition
| Club | Season | League | | | FA Cup | | EFL Cup | | Europe | | Other | | Total | |
| Club | Season | Division | Apps | Goals | Apps | Goals | Apps | Goals | Apps | Goals | Apps | Goals | Apps | Goals |
|---|---|---|---|---|---|---|---|---|---|---|---|---|---|---|
| Arsenal | 2025–26 | Premier League | 6 | 1 | 2 | 0 | 2 | 0 | 3 (Note: Appearances in UEFA Champions League) | 0 | — | | 13 | 1 |
| Arsenal | 2026–27 | Premier League | 2 | 0 | 0 | 0 | 2 | 2 | 2 | 0 | 0 | 0 | 6 | 2 |
| Career total | | | 8 | 1 | 2 | 0 | 4 | 2 | 5 | 0 | 0 | 0 | 19 | 3 |

== Honours ==
Arsenal

- Premier League: 2025–26
- FA Community Shield: 2026
- EFL Cup runner-up: 2025–26
- UEFA Champions League runner-up: 2025–26

Individual

- Premier League Home Grown Debutant of the Season: 2025–26

Records

- Youngest player to appear in the UEFA Champions League: aged 15 years and 308 days
- Youngest goalscorer in Premier League history: aged 16 years and 73 days
- Youngest player to win the Premier League: aged 16 years and 114 days
