= Riccardo Calafiori =

Italian footballer (born 2002)

- Calafiori with Arsenal in 2026

Personal information
- Full name: Riccardo Calafiori
- Date of birth: 19 May 2002 (age 24)
- Place of birth: Rome, Italy
- Height: 1.88 m (6 ft 2 in)
- Positions: Left-back; centre-back

Team information
- Current team: Arsenal
- Number: 33

Youth career
- 2008–2010: Petriana
- 2010–2020: Roma

Senior career*
Years	Team	Apps	(Gls)
2020–2022	Roma	10	(0)
2022	→ Genoa (loan)	3	(0)
2022–2023	Basel	25	(1)
2023–2024	Bologna	30	(2)
2024–	Arsenal	56	(4)

International career^{‡}
2017	Italy U15	7	(0)
2017–2018	Italy U16	9	(1)
2018	Italy U17	3	(1)
2020	Italy U19	2	(0)
2021–2024	Italy U21	9	(0)
2024–	Italy	19	(1)
- * Club domestic league appearances and goals as of 19:33, 21 November 2026 (UTC) ‡ National team caps and goals as of 23:10, 15 November 2026 (UTC)

Riccardo Calafiori (born 19 May 2002) is an Italian professional footballer who plays as a left-back or centre-back for Premier League club Arsenal and the Italy national team.

Calafiori began his senior career with Roma. He featured sparingly for the club, and was loaned out to Genoa, before departing to Basel and later Bologna. In July 2024, he joined Premier League club Arsenal for an initial fee of £33.6 million.

Calafiori has represented Italy through various youth levels since 2017, and made his senior debut in June 2024. He played for Italy during UEFA Euro 2024, starting in all three group matches.

== Club career ==
=== Roma ===
A youth product of Roma, Calafiori signed his first contract with them on 16 June 2018. Calafiori suffered a near career-ending injury to his knee on 2 October 2018. Calafiori made his professional as well as Serie A debut with AS Roma in a 3–1 away victory against Juventus on 1 August 2020. During the match, he won a penalty which was successfully converted by teammate Diego Perotti, and Calafiori also scored a goal with a strike from distance following a corner. However, the goal was disallowed, as the ball had previously gone out of play.

The following season, on 3 December 2020, Calafiori was brought on by Roma coach Paulo Fonseca as Leonardo Spinazzola's substitute, and scored his first professional goal in Roma's home win against Young Boys in the UEFA Europa League. On 14 January 2022, Calafiori joined Genoa on loan.

=== Basel ===
On 30 August 2022, Roma announced that Calafiori had joined Basel on a permanent deal. Calafiori signed a three-year contract with them and joined Basel's first team for their 2022–23 season under head coach Alexander Frei. Calafiori played his domestic league debut for his new club in the away game at the Cornaredo on 9 October 2022 as Basel were defeated 1–0 by Lugano. His beginnings with the team were difficult, but as the season evolved, Calafiori became secure and advance to become a regular starting player. He scored his first (and only) goal for his new team on 16 March 2023 in the away game at Tehelné pole as Basel played a 2–2 draw with Slovan Bratislava in the round of 16 of the 2022–23 Conference League. The game ended with an aggregate score 4–4. In the penalty shoot-out Calafiori also netted his attempt as Basel won this to continue in the next round. His goal in the second leg was an important contribution to FCB's route to the semi-finals of this competition. Eventually in the semi-final, their campaign came to an unlucky end in the 10th minute of added time of the extra-time, because then they conceded the decider and were defeated by ACF Fiorentina.

With his strong performances, especially in the second half of the season, Calafiori aroused the interest of several clubs from his homeland and before returning to Italy at the end of August. During his time with the club, Calafiori played a total of 44 games for Basel scoring just that one afore mentioned goal. 26 of these games were in the Swiss Super League, three in the Swiss Cup, nine in the Conference League and six were friendly games.

=== Bologna ===
On 31 August 2023, Calafiori returned to Serie A and signed with Bologna alongside Basel teammate Dan Ndoye. Under head coach Thiago Motta, he was switched to a centre-back role, where he emerged as one of the best players in the league. On 20 May 2024, he scored his first Serie A goals by netting a brace in a 3–3 draw against Juventus, with Bologna conceding three quick goals following his substitution in the 75th minute. Throughout the season, he helped Bologna qualify for the UEFA Champions League for the first time since 1964–65, ensuring a top-five finish in Serie A.

=== Arsenal ===
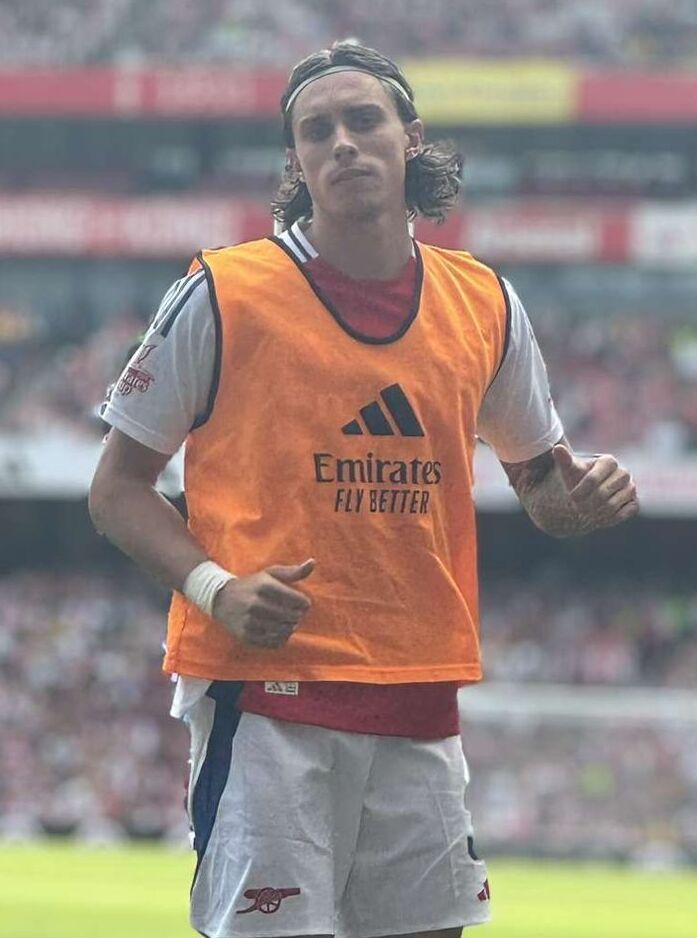
Calafiori with Arsenal in 2024

On 29 July 2024, Calafiori joined Premier League club Arsenal on a long-term contract for an initial reported fee of £33.6 million, rising to £42 million with add-ons. He made his debut against Aston Villa on 24 August 2024. On 22 September, on his first full start for Arsenal, Calafiori scored his first goal for the club in a 2–2 draw against Manchester City at the Etihad Stadium, scoring from outside the box following a pass from Gabriel Martinelli. The goal was later voted Arsenal's goal of the month for September on the club's website. Calafiori scored his second for the Gunners on 25 January 2025, this time a 74th minute away winner at Wolves. Two months later, on 4 March, he netted his first Champions League goal in a 7–1 away win over PSV Eindhoven during the Round of 16.

On 17 August 2025, Calafiori scored a header in Arsenal's first match of the 2025–26 Premier League, helping his team to a 1–0 away victory against Manchester United. An excellent start to the season saw Calafiori nominated for the Premier League Player of the Month award for August, after registering a goal, two assists, and helping his side to two clean sheets in the opening three games. On 19 May 2026, his 24th birthday, Arsenal won the Premier League, and Calafiori became the third Italian player to earn a Premier League winners medal, after Mario Balotelli in 2012, and Federico Chiesa in 2025.

On 16 August 2026, Calafiori scored the fastest goal in Community Shield history after 23 seconds, helping Arsenal defeat Manchester City 3–0 and win the trophy.

== International career ==
On 3 September 2021, Calafiori made his debut with the Italy U21 squad, playing as a substitute in the qualifying match against Luxembourg, which Italy won 3–0. On 23 May 2024, he received his first official call-up to the Italy senior national team, being included in the preliminary squad for UEFA Euro 2024 by manager Luciano Spalletti. He debuted for the senior team on 4 June, coming on as a substitute for Federico Dimarco in the 85th minute of a goalless friendly draw against Turkey in Bologna.

Having subsequently been confirmed in the final squad for UEFA Euro 2024, Calafiori made his competitive debut on 15 June, starting in a 2–1 victory over Albania in the group stage; at 22 years and 27 days, he became the second-youngest defender to play for Italy in the UEFA European Championship, behind only Paolo Maldini. He scored an own goal in Italy's 1–0 defeat to Spain in their second match. In their final group stage match against Croatia, he assisted Mattia Zaccagni's stoppage-time equaliser in a 1–1 draw that sent Italy through to the round of 16 with a second-place finish. However, he also received a booking during the match, which ruled him out of Italy's second-round fixture against Switzerland, in which Italy were eliminated from the tournament via 2–0 defeat.

== Style of play ==
A left-footed defender, Calafiori started out playing as a left-back or left-sided wing-back, before being shifted to a centre-back role during his spell at Bologna, under manager Thiago Motta, due to his ability to start attacking plays from the back with his passing range, establishing himself as one of the best defenders in Serie A during the 2023–24 season. Tactically, he is capable of playing in a back three or a back four, and is known for his anticipation, as well as his aggressive and physical style when putting pressure on opponents.

A quick and powerful player, he has been mainly praised for his technique and his shooting prowess from distance, while also being known for his ball-carrying ability. His height also makes him effective in aerial duels. As a full-back, he was capable of getting forward to provide crosses from the touchline, or assisting his team defensively with his quick recoveries. Considered to be one of the most promising Italian talents of his generation, he was included in The Guardian's 2019 Next Generation list of the 60 best young talents in world football, before being named as one of UEFA's "50 for the future" in 2021.

== Career statistics ==
=== Club ===
As of match played 7 November 2026

Appearances and goals by club, season and competition
Club	Season	League			National cup (Note: Includes Swiss Cup, Coppa Italia, FA Cup)		League cup (Note: Includes EFL Cup)		Europe		Other		Total	
Club	Season	Division	Apps	Goals	Apps	Goals	Apps	Goals	Apps	Goals	Apps	Goals	Apps	Goals
Roma	2019–20	Serie A	1	0	0	0	—		0	0	—		1	0
Roma	2020–21	Serie A	3	0	0	0	—		5 (Note: Appearances in UEFA Europa League)	1	—		8	1
Roma	2021–22	Serie A	6	0	0	0	—		3 (Note: Appearance(s) in UEFA Europa Conference League)	0	—		9	0
Roma	Total		10	0	0	0	—		8	1	—		18	1
Genoa (loan)	2021–22	Serie A	3	0	—		—		—		—		3	0
Basel	2022–23	Swiss Super League	23	0	3	0	—		8	1	—		34	1
Basel	2023–24	Swiss Super League	3	0	0	0	—		1	0	—		4	0
Basel	Total		26	0	3	0	—		9	1	—		38	1
Bologna	2023–24	Serie A	30	2	3	0	—		—		—		33	2
Arsenal	2024–25	Premier League	19	2	0	0	2	0	8 (Note: Appearances in UEFA Champions League)	1	—		29	3
Arsenal	2025–26	Premier League	26	1	2	0	2	0	6	0	—		36	1
Arsenal	2026–27	Premier League	10	1	0	0	0	0	1	0	1 (Note: Appearance in FA Community Shield)	1	12	2
Arsenal	Total		55	4	2	0	4	0	15	1	1	1	77	6
Career total			124	6	8	0	4	0	32	3	1	1	169	10

=== International ===
As of match played 15 November 2026

Appearances and goals by national team and year
National team	Year	Apps	Goals
Italy	2024	8	0
Italy	2025	4	0
Italy	2026	7	1
Total		19	1

As of match played 5 October 2026
Italy score listed first, score column indicates score after each Calafiori goal

List of international goals scored by Riccardo Calafiori
No.	Date	Venue	Cap	Opponent	Score	Result	Competition	Ref.
1	5 October 2026	Stadio Renato Dall'Ara, Bologna, Italy	17	Turkey	2–1	3–1	2026–27 UEFA Nations League A	

== Honours ==
Arsenal

- Premier League: 2025–26
- FA Community Shield: 2026
- EFL Cup runner-up: 2025–26
- UEFA Champions League runner-up: 2025–26

Individual

- Serie A Player of the Month: May 2024
- Serie A Team of the Year: 2023–24
