= Marli Salmon =

English footballer (born 2009)

Personal information
- Date of birth: 29 August 2009 (age 17)
- Place of birth: Leytonstone, England
- Height: 6 ft 1 in (1.86 m)
- Positions: Centre-back; right-back

Team information
- Current team: Arsenal
- Number: 89

Youth career
- Arsenal

Senior career*
Years	Team	Apps	(Gls)
2025–	Arsenal	0	(0)

International career^{‡}
- England U16
2025–2026	England U17	4	(0)
2026–	England U18	0	(0)
- * Club domestic league appearances and goals ‡ National team caps and goals as of 15:14, 31 March 2026 (UTC)

Marli Salmon (born 29 August 2009) is an English professional footballer who plays as a centre-back or a right-back for Premier League club Arsenal.

== Club career ==
In March 2026, Salmon was called up for Arsenal's first-team FA Cup fifth round against Mansfield making his first start for the club. This followed an earlier pre-season tour to Singapore and Hong Kong, in July 2025 becoming one of Arsenal's youngest players at the age of 15. He played six times in the Premier League 2 in the 2024–25 season, as well as twice in the UEFA Youth League.

Salmon made his Arsenal first-team debut on 10 December 2025 as an 83rd minute substitute (replacing Ben White) in a 3–0 UEFA Champions League away win over Club Brugge.

== International career ==
On 28 October 2025, Salmon made his England U17 debut during a 1–0 defeat to Scotland as part of a 2026 UEFA European Under-17 Championship qualification match in Airdrie.

Just days later, Salmon was a late call up for England's squad at the 2025 FIFA U-17 World Cup.

== Personal life ==
Marli Salmon grew up in Woodford. His father's side of the family is Jamaican, and his mother's side is Mauritian.

== Career statistics ==
As of match played 27 October 2026

Appearances and goals by club, season and competition
Club	Season	League			FA Cup		EFL Cup		Europe		Other		Total	
Club	Season	Division	Apps	Goals	Apps	Goals	Apps	Goals	Apps	Goals	Apps	Goals	Apps	Goals
Arsenal U21	2025–26	—			—		—		—		1 (Note: Appearance in EFL Trophy)	0	1	0
Arsenal	2025–26	Premier League	0	0	3	0	0	0	1 (Note: Appearance in UEFA Champions League)	0	—		4	0
Arsenal	2026–27	Premier League	0	0	0	0	2	0	0	0	0	0	2	0
Arsenal	Total		0	0	3	0	2	0	1	0	0	0	6	0
Career total			0	0	3	0	2	0	1	0	1	0	7	0
