= Piero Hincapié =

Ecuadorian footballer (born 2002)

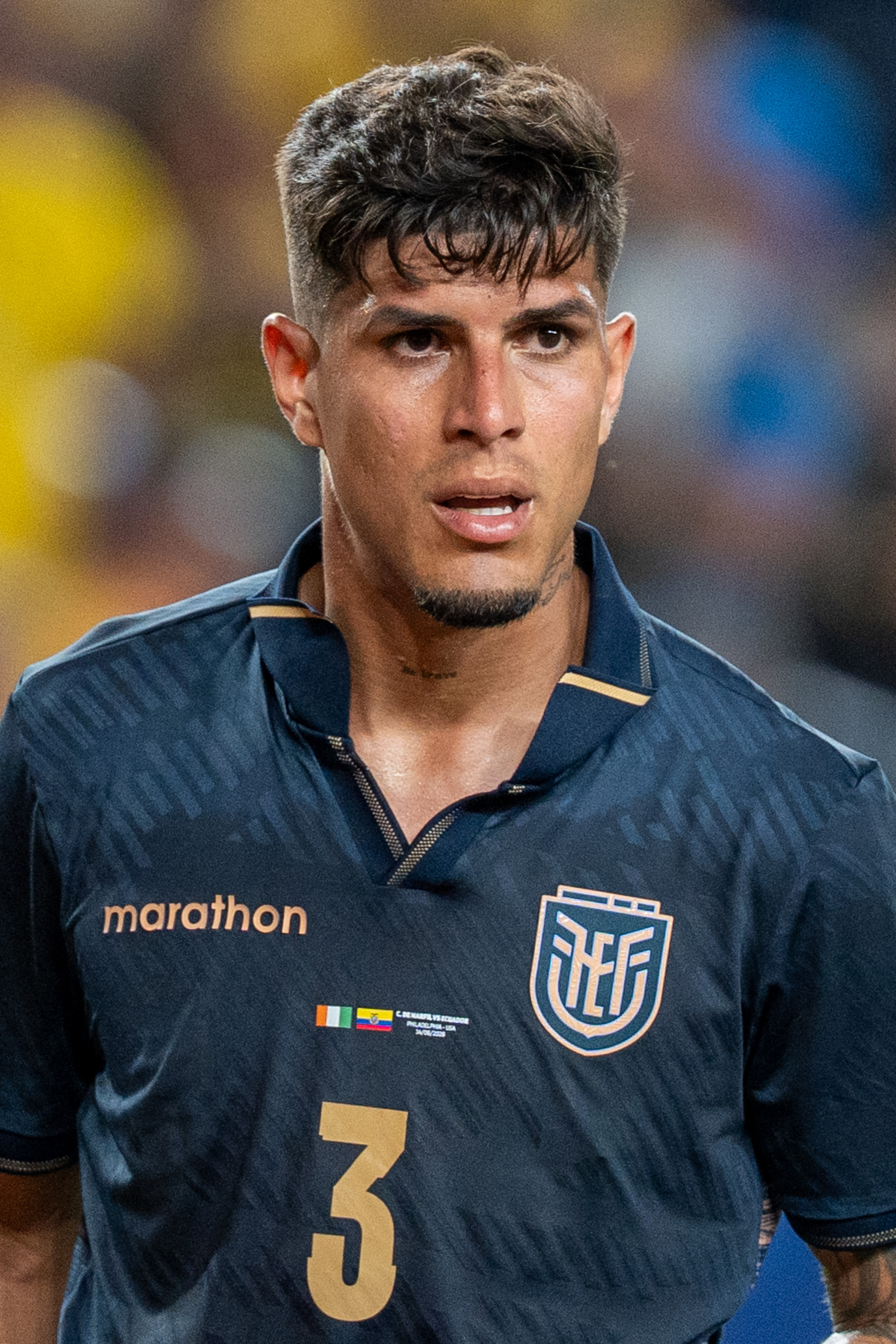
- Hincapié with Ecuador in 2026

Personal information
- Full name: Piero Martín Hincapié Reyna
- Date of birth: 9 January 2002 (age 24)
- Place of birth: Esmeraldas, Ecuador
- Height: 1.84 m (6 ft 0 in)
- Positions: Centre-back; left-back

Team information
- Current team: Arsenal
- Number: 5

Youth career
- 2009–2010: Emelec Esmeraldas
- 2010–2012: Barcelona Esmeraldas
- 2012–2013: Norte América
- 2013–2016: Deportivo Azogues
- 2016–2019: Independiente del Valle

Senior career*
Years	Team	Apps	(Gls)
2019–2020	Independiente del Valle	3	(0)
2020–2021	Talleres	14	(0)
2021–2026	Bayer Leverkusen	116	(5)
2025–2026	→ Arsenal (loan)	25	(1)
2026–	Arsenal	5	(0)

International career^{‡}
2019	Ecuador U17	11	(0)
2021–	Ecuador	56	(3)
- * Club domestic league appearances and goals as of 17:01, 7 November (UTC) ‡ National team caps and goals as of 1 July 2026

Piero Martín Hincapié Reyna (Spanish pronunciation: [ˈpjeɾo iŋkaˈpje]; born 9 January 2002) is an Ecuadorian professional footballer who plays as a centre-back or left-back for Premier League club Arsenal and the Ecuador national team.

== Club career ==
=== Early career ===
Hincapié began playing football at the age of seven, initially for local clubs Escuela Refinería, Emelec and Barcelona. Aged ten, the defender moved to Guayaquil with Norte América. After a spell with Deportivo Azogues, he joined Independiente del Valle in November 2016. Hincapié was promoted into their first-team in August 2019 for a Serie A match with Mushuc Runa. He was selected to start and played the full duration of a narrow home defeat. In the subsequent 2020 campaign, shortly after winning the U-20 Copa Libertadores, Hincapié made appearances off the bench against Universidad Católica and Macará.

=== Talleres ===
On 20 August 2020, Hincapié agreed a five-year contract with Primera División side Talleres; who paid $1,000,000 for 50% of his pass.

=== Bayer Leverkusen ===
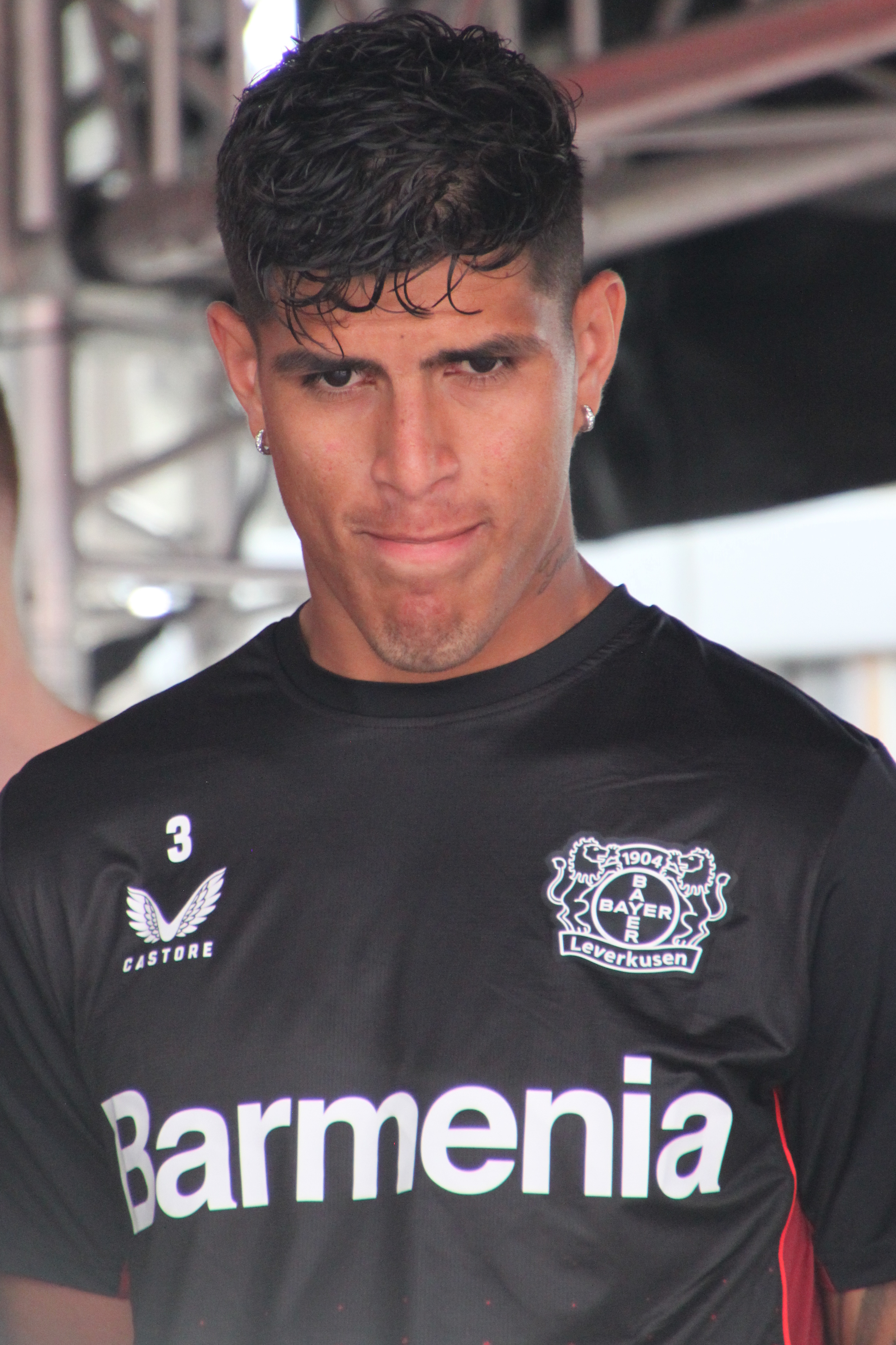
Hincapié with Bayer 04 Leverkusen in 2022

In August 2021, Hincapié signed for German club Bayer Leverkusen. He made his debut on 16 August, coming into the Europa League group stage match against Ferencváros as Leverkusen won 2–1. He scored his first goal for the club on 30 September, and the games' opening goal against Celtic in a 4–0 victory in the Europa League. In the 2023–24 season, Hincapié was part of the Leverkusen team that won the club's first-ever Bundesliga title, doing so whilst remaining undefeated throughout the entire league season.

=== Arsenal ===
On 1 September 2025, Hincapié joined Premier League club Arsenal on a season-long loan with an option to buy, initially reported as being worth £45 million (€52 million). He made his debut off the bench against Athletic Bilbao in the UEFA Champions League on 16 September, but picked up a groin injury in a training session shortly after. On 26 October, Hincapié made his league debut, also from the bench, against Crystal Palace. He started in his EFL Cup debut on 29 October against Brighton & Hove Albion.

Hincapié scored his first goal for Arsenal on 18 February 2026, in a 2–2 draw against Wolverhampton Wanderers at Molineux. On 11 March 2026, Hincapié started for Arsenal against his parent club in the UEFA Champions League, playing the entire 1–1 draw in the first leg of the Round of 16 tie at the BayArena. He then played in the second leg at Emirates Stadium on 17 March, as Arsenal progressed to the quarter-finals with a 2–0 (3–1 on aggregate) win.

Hincapié won the Premier League title in his debut season with the club. He later started in the 2026 Champions League final, where Arsenal lost 4–3 on penalties to Paris Saint-Germain after a 1–1 draw following extra time. On 25 June 2026, it was announced that Arsenal had activated their option to sign Hincapié on a permanent basis for a fee reported to be £34.5 million plus add-ons, on a five-year-contract.

On 10 October 2026 Hincapié came an 82nd-minute substitute in a 2–1 home win over Leeds United, but injured his ankle during the post-match warm-down and was ruled out of the following Champions League match against Lille. With the Ecuadorian set to spend up to 3 weeks on the sidelines.

== International career ==
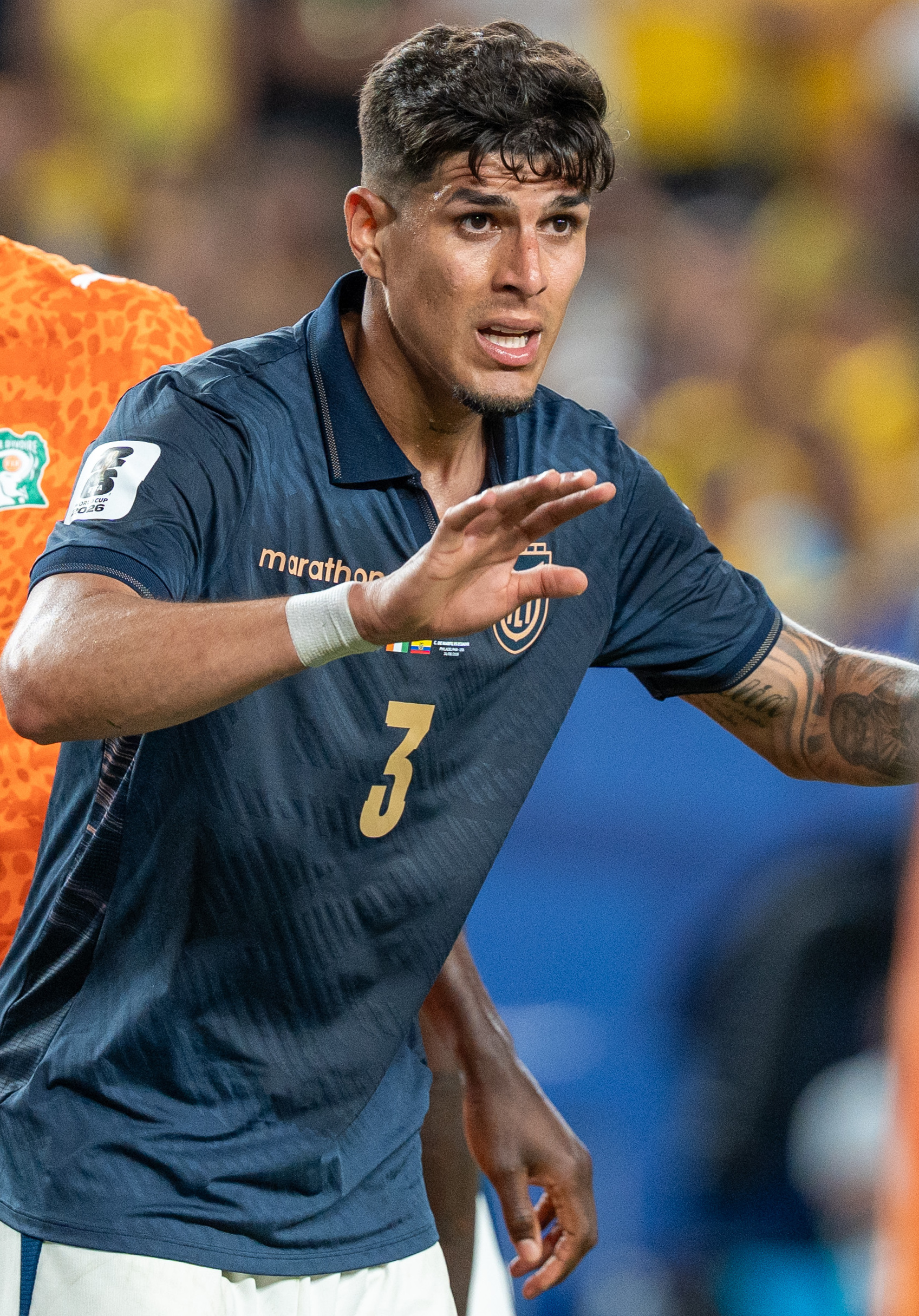
Hincapié with Ecuador at the 2026 FIFA World Cup

Hincapié appeared for the Ecuador U15s in 2017. In 2019, Hincapié represented his country as captain at U17 level. He played seven times at the South American U-17 Championship in Peru, before featuring four times at the subsequent FIFA U-17 World Cup in Brazil.

Hincapié was selected in the 28 player Ecuador squad for the 2021 Copa América. On 13 June 2021, Hincapié debuted for the Ecuador senior squad in a 2021 Copa América match against Colombia, playing the full match as Ecuador lost 1–0.

On 14 November 2022, Hincapié was named in Ecuador's 26-man squad for the 2022 FIFA World Cup. He played 90 minutes in the group stage win against Qatar, the draw against the Netherlands, and defeat against Senegal.

Hincapié was called up to the final 26-man Ecuador squad for the 2024 Copa América.

On 31 May 2026, Hincapié was selected in the 26-man squad for the 2026 FIFA World Cup. On 30 June 2026, Hincapié was sent off by Slovenian referee Slavko Vinčić after he was seen covering his mouth while verbally confronting Santiago Giménez, a red card-worthy offense under newly introduced FIFA rules. Ecuador lost the game 0–2 and were eliminated from the FIFA World Cup in that match.

== Career statistics ==
=== Club ===
As of match played 4 November 2026

Appearances and goals by club, season and competition
Club	Season	League			National cup (Note: Includes Copa Argentina, DFB-Pokal, FA Cup)		League cup (Note: Includes EFL Cup)		Continental		Other		Total	
Club	Season	Division	Apps	Goals	Apps	Goals	Apps	Goals	Apps	Goals	Apps	Goals	Apps	Goals
Independiente del Valle	2019	Ecuadorian Serie A	1	0	0	0	—		0	0	—		1	0
Independiente del Valle	2020	Ecuadorian Serie A	2	0	0	0	—		0	0	—		2	0
Independiente del Valle	Total		3	0	0	0	—		0	0	—		3	0
Talleres	2021	Argentine Primera División	14	0	2	0	—		6 (Note: Appearances in Copa Sudamericana)	0	—		22	0
Bayer Leverkusen	2021–22	Bundesliga	27	1	0	0	—		6 (Note: Appearances in UEFA Europa League)	1	—		33	2
Bayer Leverkusen	2022–23	Bundesliga	30	1	0	0	—		13 (Note: Five appearances in UEFA Champions League, eight appearances in UEFA Europa League)	0	—		43	1
Bayer Leverkusen	2023–24	Bundesliga	26	1	5	0	—		12	0	—		43	1
Bayer Leverkusen	2024–25	Bundesliga	32	2	3	0	—		9 (Note: Appearances in UEFA Champions League)	1	1 (Note: Appearance in DFL-Supercup)	0	45	3
Bayer Leverkusen	2025–26	Bundesliga	1	0	1	0	—		—		—		2	0
Bayer Leverkusen	Total		116	5	9	0	—		40	2	1	0	166	7
Arsenal (loan)	2025–26	Premier League	25	1	1	0	3	0	10	0	—		39	1
Arsenal	2026–27	Premier League	4	0	0	0	1	0	2	0	1 (Note: Appearance in FA Community Shield)	0	8	0
Arsenal	Arsenal total		29	1	1	0	4	0	12	0	1	0	47	1
Career total			162	6	12	0	4	0	58	2	2	0	238	8

=== International ===
As of match played 30 June 2026

Appearances and goals by national team and year
National team	Year	Apps	Goals
Ecuador	2021	12	1
Ecuador	2022	12	0
Ecuador	2023	6	0
Ecuador	2024	13	2
Ecuador	2025	7	0
Ecuador	2026	6	0
Total		56	3

Scores and results list Ecuador's goal tally first.

List of international goals scored by Piero Hincapié
No.	Date	Venue	Opponent	Score	Result	Competition
1	11 November 2021	Estadio Rodrigo Paz Delgado, Quito, Ecuador	Venezuela	1–0	1–0	2022 FIFA World Cup qualification
2	16 June 2024	Pratt & Whitney Stadium, East Hartford, United States	Honduras	2–1	2–1	Friendly
3	26 June 2024	Allegiant Stadium, Paradise, United States	Jamaica	1–0	3–1	2024 Copa América

== Honours ==
Independiente del Valle

- U-20 Copa Libertadores: 2020

Bayer Leverkusen

- Bundesliga: 2023–24
- DFB-Pokal: 2023–24
- DFL-Supercup: 2024
- UEFA Europa League runner-up: 2023–24

Arsenal

- Premier League: 2025–26
- FA Community Shield: 2026
- EFL Cup runner-up: 2025–26
- UEFA Champions League runner-up: 2025–26

Individual

- IFFHS Men's World Youth (U20) Team: 2022
- Copa América Team of the Tournament: 2024
- IFFHS Men's CONMEBOL Team: 2024
- Kicker Bundesliga Team of the Season: 2024–25
