= Cristhian Mosquera =

Spanish footballer (born 2004)

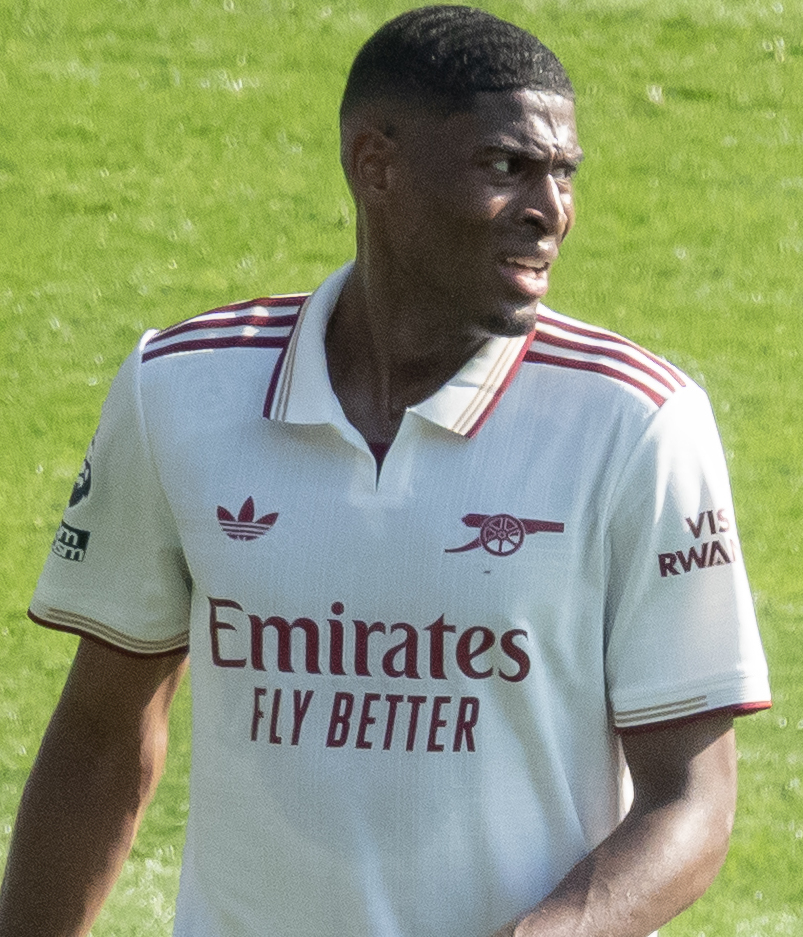
- Mosquera in 2026

Personal information
- Full name: Cristhian Andrey Mosquera Ibargüen
- Date of birth: 27 June 2004 (age 22)
- Place of birth: Alicante, Spain
- Height: 1.91 m (6 ft 3 in)
- Position: Centre back

Team information
- Current team: Arsenal
- Number: 3

Youth career
- –2013: Carolinas
- 2013–2016: Hércules
- 2016–2021: Valencia

Senior career*
Years	Team	Apps	(Gls)
2021–2023	Valencia B	14	(0)
2021–2025	Valencia	82	(1)
2025–	Arsenal	22	(0)

International career^{‡}
2018–2019	Spain U15	4	(0)
2019	Spain U16	4	(0)
2021–2022	Spain U18	8	(0)
2022–2023	Spain U19	8	(0)
2024–	Spain U21	15	(0)
2024–	Spain U23	1	(0)
2026–	Spain	2	(0)
Medal record
Men's football
Representing Spain
Olympic Games
Gold medal – first place	2024
- * Club domestic league appearances and goals as of 22:21, 31 August 2026 (UTC) ‡ National team caps and goals as of 31 March 2026 (UTC)

Cristhian Andrey Mosquera Ibargüen (born 27 June 2004) is a Spanish professional footballer who plays as a centre-back for Premier League club Arsenal and the Spain national team.

== Early life ==
Born in Alicante, Valencian Community to Colombian parents, Mosquera first played basketball in his hometown, before joining futsal team San Blas Cañavate, as his cousin was playing there and they were missing a player for a youth tournament. Having later moved to play in Carolines Altes-based team SCD Carolinas, he eventually joined the city main football club, Hércules CF.

Cristhian has a younger brother named Yulian Mosquera, born in 2011, who plays for Valencia's Academy and Spain U15s, and is considered a talented prospect in Spain. When Cristhian signed with Arsenal, club manager Mikel Arteta jokingly made Yulian take a photo with a mock Arsenal contract.

== Club career ==
=== Valencia ===
Mosquera joined Valencia CF's youth setup in 2016, aged 12. On 22 August 2020, while still in the Juvenil A squad, he renewed his contract with the club until 2023. He made his senior debut with the reserves on 4 September 2021, starting in a 3–1 Tercera División RFEF home win over CD Castellón B.

Having already featured on the bench for a few Liga fixtures that season, he made his first team debut on 16 January 2022, starting in a 1–0 away win over CD Atlético Baleares, for the season's Copa del Rey. Playing every minute of the game in the center of a three-man defense, his coach José Bordalás praised him as the best on the field that night. At the age of 17 years, six months and 23 days, he became the eight-youngest player in the club's history, and the youngest centre-back.

Set to further renew his contract with the Che until 2025, Mosquera made his La Liga debut on 19 January 2022 by starting in a 1–1 draw against Sevilla, again impressing in the axis of the defense for what was a difficult game against the likes of Rafa Mir. This made him the fourth-youngest footballer to ever play in La Liga with Los murciélagos, surpassing the records set by Ferran Torres, Lee Kang-in and Yunus Musah.

In August 2023, Mosquera was definitely promoted to the main squad of the Che. On 9 February 2025, he netted his first career goal in a 2–0 win over Leganés in La Liga.

=== Arsenal ===
On 24 July 2025, Mosquera joined Premier League club Arsenal on a long-term contract for an initial fee believed to be £13 million. He made his Arsenal debut against Leeds United on 23 August 2025 in Emirates Stadium, coming on for Jurrien Timber in the 64th minute and securing a 5–0 victory for the hosts. With William Saliba picking up an injury five minutes into the game against Liverpool at Anfield, Mosquera came on as a substitute, with his performance being a positive despite Arsenal losing the game. He also started the following match, a 3–0 victory against Nottingham Forest, receiving praise by both fans and pundits.

In the 2026 UEFA Champions League final, Mosquera conceded a penalty after fouling PSG winger Khvicha Kvaratskhelia. Ousmane Dembélé converted the resulting spot kick to level the score for PSG. Mosquera was substituted in the 66th minute, and Arsenal ultimately went on to lose the final in a tense penalty shootout.

== International career ==
Mosquera represented Spain at under-15, under-16 and under-18 levels, winning a friendly tournament with the latter in October 2021, against Turkey, Romania and Portugal.

He also holds a Colombian passport, which made him eligible to play for Los Cafeteros as well as Spain.

On 27 March 2026, Mosquera made his senior Spain debut against Serbia in a friendly match.

== Style of play ==
Mainly playing as a centre-back during his time at Valencia's academy, Mosquera can also play as a full-back on both sides. When he made the switch from futsal to association football as a youngster, he actually played as a winger, where he first showed his athletic abilities.

Mosquera was known for his strong physical presence at a young age, as well as being noted for his speed, anticipation and ability to play the ball as a defender, helping his teams move forward. Miguel Ángel Angulo – his coach at Valencia Mestalla – described Mosquera's profile as characterized by his "physical condition and good technical qualities".

== Career statistics ==
=== Club ===
As of match played 4 November 2026

Appearances and goals by club, season and competition
Club	Season	League			National cup (Note: Includes Copa del Rey, FA Cup)		League cup (Note: Includes EFL Cup)		Europe		Other		Total	
Club	Season	Division	Apps	Goals	Apps	Goals	Apps	Goals	Apps	Goals	Apps	Goals	Apps	Goals
Valencia B	2021–22	Tercera División RFEF	4	0	—		—		—		—		4	0
Valencia B	2022–23	Segunda Federación	10	0	—		—		—		—		10	0
Valencia B	Total		14	0	—		—		—		—		14	0
Valencia	2021–22	La Liga	6	0	1	0	—		—		—		7	0
Valencia	2022–23	La Liga	3	0	1	0	—		—		—		4	0
Valencia	2023–24	La Liga	36	0	2	0	—		—		—		38	0
Valencia	2024–25	La Liga	37	1	4	0	—		—		—		41	1
Valencia	Total		82	1	8	0	—		—		—		90	1
Arsenal	2025–26	Premier League	20	0	3	0	2	0	10 (Note: Appearances in UEFA Champions League)	0	—		35	0
Arsenal	2026–27	Premier League	2	0	0	0	0	0	2	0	1 (Note: Appearance in FA Community Shield)	0	5	0
Arsenal	Total		22	0	3	0	2	0	12	0	1	0	40	0
Career total			118	1	11	0	2	0	12	0	1	0	144	1

=== International ===
As of match played 31 March 2026

Appearances and goals by national team and year
National team	Year	Apps	Goals
Spain	2026	2	0
Total		2	0

== Honours ==
Arsenal

- Premier League: 2025–26
- FA Community Shield: 2026
- EFL Cup runner-up: 2025–26
- UEFA Champions League runner-up: 2025–26

Spain U23

- Summer Olympics gold medal: 2024
