= Myles Lewis-Skelly =

English footballer (born 2006)

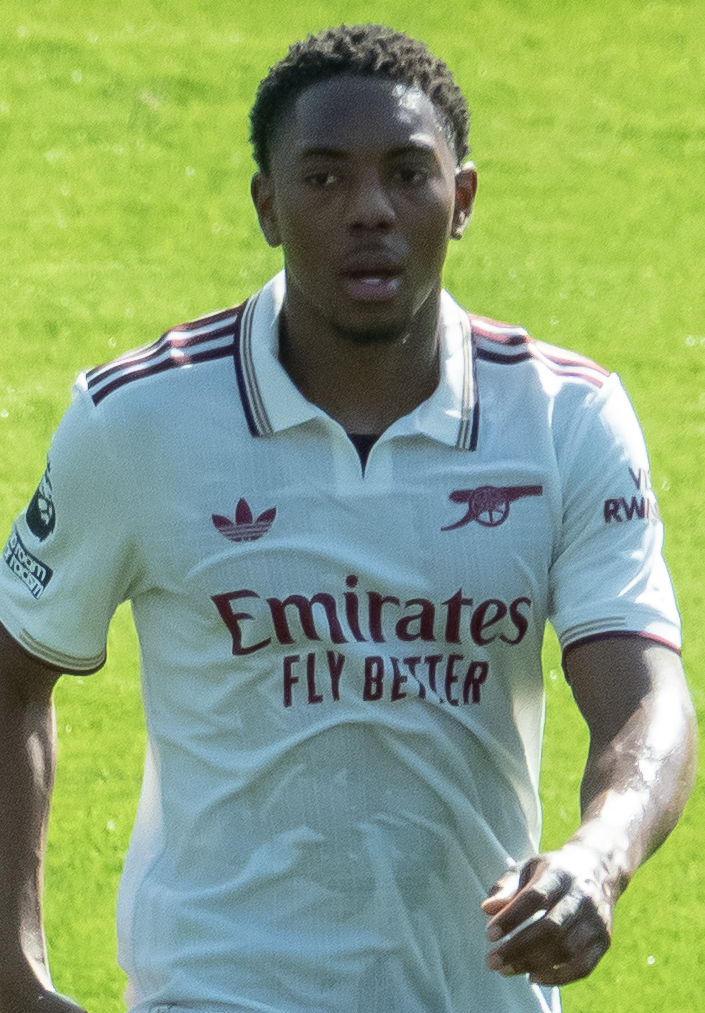
- Lewis-Skelly with Arsenal in 2026

Personal information
- Full name: Myles Anthony Lewis-Skelly
- Date of birth: 26 September 2006 (age 20)
- Place of birth: Denmark Hill, London, England
- Height: 5 ft 10 in (1.78 m)
- Positions: Midfielder; left-back

Team information
- Current team: Arsenal
- Number: 49

Youth career
- 2015–2024: Arsenal

Senior career*
Years	Team	Apps	(Gls)
2024–	Arsenal	51	(1)

International career^{‡}
2021–2022	England U16	5	(0)
2022–2023	England U17	21	(2)
2023–2024	England U18	4	(0)
2024	England U19	5	(0)
2026–	England U21	2	(0)
2025–	England	11	(1)
- * Club domestic league appearances and goals as of 19:44, 21 November 2026 (UTC) ‡ National team caps and goals as of 21:55, 15 November 2026 (UTC)

Myles Anthony Lewis-Skelly (born 26 September 2006) is an English professional footballer who plays as a midfielder or left-back for Premier League club Arsenal and the England national team.

Lewis-Skelly has been with Arsenal since the age of eight, making his first-team debut with the club in September 2024, during the 2024–25 season.

Having representing England at multiple youth levels, Lewis-Skelly was selected for the senior squad in March 2025 for 2026 FIFA World Cup qualification, making his debut and scoring his first international goal against Albania.

== Early life ==
Myles Anthony Lewis-Skelly was born on 26 September 2006, in Denmark Hill, London. His parents are both British-born of mixed Barbadian, Saint Lucian and Guyanese descent. He also holds Barbadian nationality.

During his time at Arsenal's Academy, Hale End, Lewis-Skelly attended Aldenham School in Hertfordshire, playing simultaneously for his school and academy team.

== Club career ==
=== Early career ===
Lewis-Skelly joined the academy of Premier League side Arsenal as a child at the age of eight. He progressed through the academy alongside friend and teammate Ethan Nwaneri, and the pair made their under-18 debut together in a 6–1 win over Reading, with both players scoring.

Lewis-Skelly drew acclaim for his performances in Arsenal's 2022–23 FA Youth Cup campaign, in which they reached the final before being defeated by West Ham United. In the fifth-round game played on 6 February 2023, he was deployed in a defensive midfield role as Arsenal beat Watford 4–2, before agreeing a scholarship deal with the club later in the same month, keeping him at Hale End for another two years, during which time he would become eligible for a professional contract.

His performance in the quarter-final win against Cambridge United earned the praise of U-18 coach and former Arsenal midfielder Jack Wilshere, who stated that Lewis-Skelly was capable of "things you can't coach". In the semi-final against Manchester City, he scored the winning goal in the final minute of extra time, as Arsenal went on to win 2–1.

=== Arsenal ===
On 5 October 2023, Arsenal announced that Lewis-Skelly had signed his first professional contract with the club. He made his senior debut for the club on 22 September 2024 in a 2–2 draw away at Manchester City, coming on for Jurriën Timber in second-half injury time. In the same match, he received a yellow card by referee Michael Oliver before his debut. Three days later, Lewis-Skelly was handed his first senior start in a 5–1 win over Bolton Wanderers in the EFL Cup. On 11 December, he made his first Champions League start in a 3–0 win over Ligue 1 side Monaco, becoming the youngest player to start for Arsenal in the competition since 2011. He was handed his first Premier League start in a 0–0 draw against Everton three days later.

On 25 January 2025, Lewis-Skelly was controversially shown a straight red card by referee Michael Oliver against Wolverhampton Wanderers after a foul on Matt Doherty was deemed serious foul play. Arsenal went on to win the match 1–0. It was reported on 28 January that Lewis-Skelly would not serve a three-match suspension after Arsenal's appeal against his red card at Wolves was upheld by an FA's independent regulatory commission. The written reasons published by the regulatory commission stated that "the Commission members were unanimous in their opinion that the Referee had made an obvious error in sending off Lewis-Skelly for the challenge that he had made. Lewis-Skelly had stepped across his opponent and tripped him up, possibly deliberately, but in doing so he had obviously not endangered the safety of his opponent or used excessive force or brutality, nor had he 'lunged' in at his opponent."

On 2 February, Lewis-Skelly scored his first goal for Arsenal in a 5–1 victory against Manchester City at the Emirates Stadium. He celebrated by performing Erling Haaland's meditation celebration; in the reverse fixture in which Manchester City had drawn 2–2 earlier in the season, Haaland had reportedly asked "who the fuck" he was. In a game against West Ham on 22 February, Lewis-Skelly saw his initial yellow card upgraded to a red following a VAR check, for denying a goalscoring opportunity on the halfway line. Arsenal went on to lose the game 1–0.

On 19 June, it was announced that Lewis-Skelly was one of six nominees for the PFA Young Player of the Year award. A week later, on 26 June, the club announced he had signed a new long-term contract. A year later, on 30 May 2026, he started the UEFA Champions League final against Paris Saint-Germain, which Arsenal lost on penalties. At 19 years and 246 days old, he became the second-youngest English player to start a Champions League final, behind only Trent Alexander-Arnold.

== International career ==
=== Youth ===
Lewis-Skelly's parents are both British, and his grandparents are of mixed Caribbean heritage (Barbados, Guyana, Jamaica, and St Lucia), and he is eligible to represent both England and Barbados at international level. During his youth career with Arsenal, he trained with the Barbados national football team. Having represented England at under-16 level, Lewis-Skelly was called up to the under-17 squad for the 2023 UEFA European Under-17 Championship. In England's second game of the tournament, Lewis-Skelly scored after seven minutes in an eventual 4–1 win over the Netherlands.

On 6 September 2023, Lewis-Skelly made his England U-18 debut during a 2–0 defeat to France in Limoges. A month later, on 2 November, he was included in the England squad for the 2023 FIFA U-17 World Cup. On 7 September 2024, Lewis-Skelly made his England U-19 debut during a 1–1 draw away to Croatia.

=== Senior ===
On 14 March 2025, Lewis-Skelly received his first England senior call-up for the 2026 FIFA World Cup qualification matches against Albania and Latvia under head coach Thomas Tuchel. Starting as a left-back in the match against the former on 21 March, Lewis-Skelly scored the first goal of the match in the 20th minute and was awarded man of the match. At 18 years and 176 days old, he became the youngest England player to score on his senior debut, breaking the record previously held by Marcus Rashford.

== Style of play ==
Predominantly a central midfielder, capable of playing in both attacking and defensive roles, Lewis-Skelly has also filled in at left-back for Arsenal's under-21 side and first team, and for the England national football team. The football website Goal described him as "excellent with the ball at his feet", with "impressive technique", and "an engine needed to be able to get from box to box". Lewis-Skelly has garnered stylistic comparisons to the likes of Arturo Vidal and Michael Essien, all-action midfielders capable of imposing themselves onto games.

== Personal life ==
Lewis-Skelly's mother is Marcia Lewis, who launched No1Fan.club in 2022, a service to assist families with children in academy football, offering workshops on topics about parenting a young person going through a professional academy. "We get parents from grassroots who want that peek over the curtain of what is in an academy. Their kids have been scouted, what does that mean?" Lewis told the BBC.

== Career statistics ==
=== Club ===
As of match played 1 November 2026

Appearances and goals by club, season and competition
Club	Season	League			FA Cup		EFL Cup		Europe		Other		Total	
Club	Season	Division	Apps	Goals	Apps	Goals	Apps	Goals	Apps	Goals	Apps	Goals	Apps	Goals
Arsenal U21	2022–23	—			—		—		—		2 (Note: Appearances in EFL Trophy)	0	2	0
Arsenal U21	2023–24	—			—		—		—		2	0	2	0
Arsenal U21	Total		—		—		—		—		4	0	4	0
Arsenal	2024–25	Premier League	23	1	1	0	5	0	10 (Note: Appearances in UEFA Champions League)	0	—		39	1
Arsenal	2025–26	Premier League	20	0	3	0	3	0	10	0	—		36	0
Arsenal	2026–27	Premier League	7	0	0	0	2	0	2	0	1 (Note: Appearance in FA Community Shield)	0	12	0
Arsenal	Total		50	1	4	0	10	0	22	0	1	0	87	1
Career total			50	1	4	0	10	0	22	0	5	0	91	1

=== International ===
As of match played 15 November 2026

Appearances and goals by national team and year
National team	Year	Apps	Goals
England	2025	6	1
England	2026	5	0
Total		11	1

As of match played 14 October 2025
England score listed first, score column indicates score after each Lewis-Skelly goal

List of international goals scored by Myles Lewis-Skelly
No.	Date	Venue	Cap	Opponent	Score	Result	Competition	Ref.
1	21 March 2025	Wembley Stadium, London, England	1	Albania	1–0	2–0	2026 FIFA World Cup qualification	

== Honours ==
Arsenal U21

- FA Youth Cup runner-up: 2022–23

Arsenal

- Premier League: 2025–26
- FA Community Shield: 2026
- EFL Cup runner-up: 2025–26
- UEFA Champions League runner-up: 2025–26

Individual

- EA Sports FC Premier League Team of the Season: 2024–25
