= 2026 FA Community Shield =

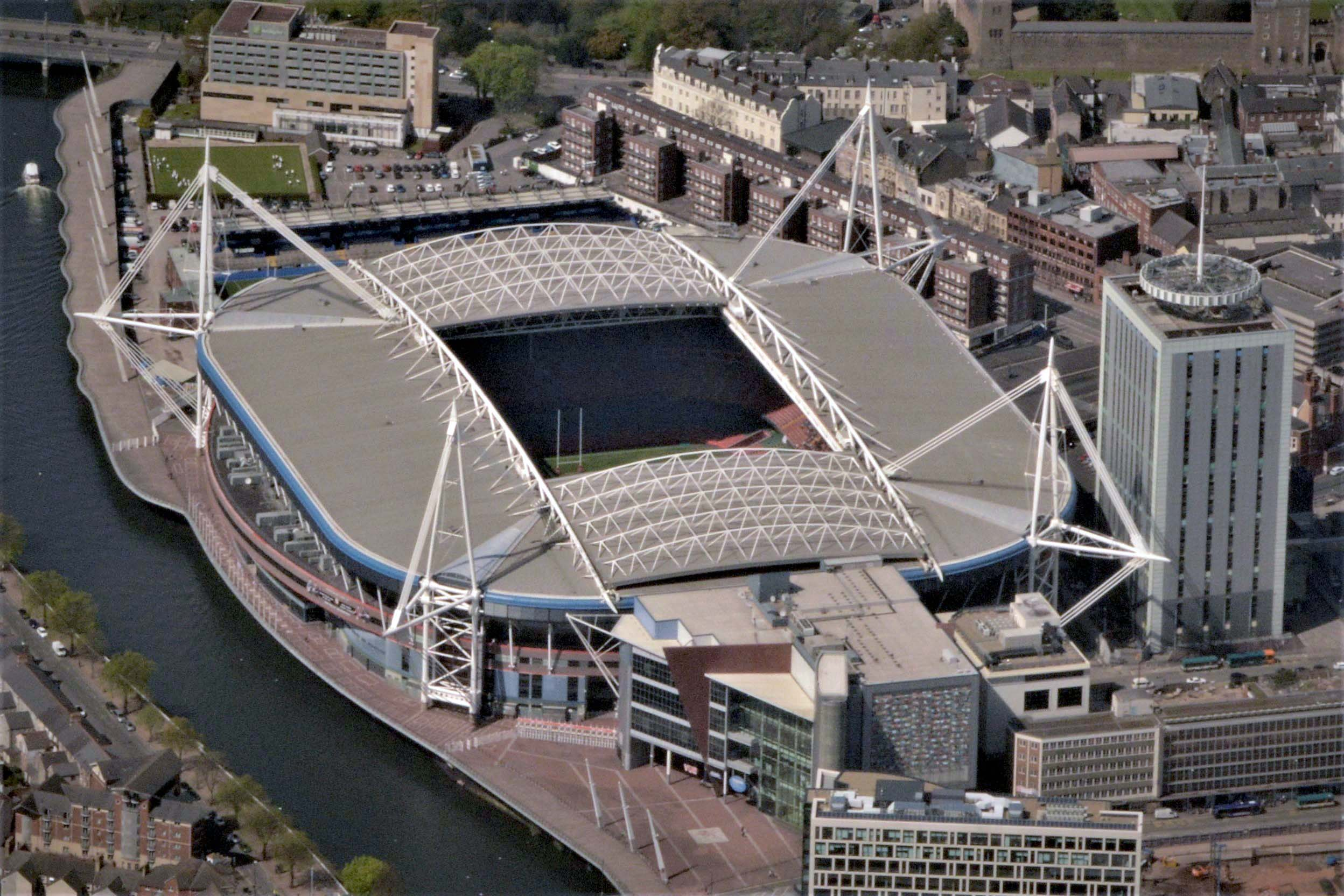
- The Millennium Stadium in Cardiff hosted the match
Arsenal	Manchester City
3	0
- Date: 16 August 2026
- Venue: Millennium Stadium, Cardiff
- Man of the Match: Martin Ødegaard (Arsenal)
- Referee: Sam Barrott (West Riding)
- Attendance: 58,056

The 2026 FA Community Shield was the 104th FA Community Shield, an annual association football match contested by the winners of the previous season's Premier League and FA Cup competitions. It was played between Arsenal and Manchester City on 16 August 2026 at the Millennium Stadium in Cardiff.

Crystal Palace were the holders, having won the 2025 edition, but they did not qualify for this fixture, being knocked out of the FA Cup in the third round in historic fashion and finishing 15th in the Premier League.

It was the first time the venue hosted the Community Shield since 2006, having hosted it between 2001 and 2006. It was the first time the Community Shield was played away from Wembley Stadium since 2022 (the third overall) due to scheduling conflicts with a concert by The Weeknd.

Arsenal won the match 3–0 for their 18th FA Community Shield title. It was their biggest win in the Community Shield in 12 years, when they beat Manchester City by an identical scoreline.

== Background ==
Arsenal and Manchester City qualified for the 2026 FA Community Shield as the winners of the 2025–26 Premier League and the 2025–26 FA Cup, respectively. It was the 217th meeting between the two sides. Manchester City won the most recent match between the two teams 2–1 on 19 April 2026. Arsenal have previously appeared in 24 Community Shield matches, winning 17 titles (one of which was shared), and appearing most recently in the 2023 edition, where they beat Manchester City on penalties after the match ended in a 1–1 draw. Manchester City have previously appeared in 16 Community Shield matches, winning 7 titles, and appearing most recently in the 2024 edition, where they beat Manchester United on penalties after the match ended in a 1–1 draw.

== Match ==
=== Summary ===
After 23 seconds, Riccardo Calafiori gave Arsenal the lead when he finished low left footed to the left corner of the net from twelve yards out after a through pass from Myles Lewis-Skelly. This was the fastest goal in Community Shield history. It was 2-0 in the 28th minute when Kai Havertz scored with a downward header from close range after the ball had been headed back to him from the left by Christos Tzolis.

In the 48th minute, Martin Ødegaard got a third goal for Arsenal when he received a low pass from Christos Tzolis from the left before getting into the penalty area and faking a shot to the right which forced the Manchester City goalkeeper Gianluigi Donnarumma to the floor before passing the ball into the left corner from six yards out.

=== Details ===
16 August 2026
15:00 BST

Arsenal	3–0	Manchester City
Calafiori 1'; Havertz 28'; Ødegaard 48'	Report

Millennium Stadium, Cardiff
Attendance: 58,056
Referee: Sam Barrott (West Riding of Yorkshire)

Arsenal	Manchester City

GK	1	(Spain) David Raya
RB	4	(England) Ben White
CB	3	(Spain) Cristhian Mosquera
CB	6	(Brazil) Gabriel Magalhães
LB	33	(Italy) Riccardo Calafiori	(yellow card) 38'	(substituted off) 60'
CM	39	(Brazil) Bruno Guimarães		(substituted off) 46'
CM	49	(England) Myles Lewis-Skelly		(substituted off) 75'
RW	20	(England) Noni Madueke		(substituted off) 60'
AM	8	(Norway) Martin Ødegaard (c)	(yellow card) 84'	(substituted off) 84'
LW	17	(Greece) Christos Tzolis
CF	29	(Germany) Kai Havertz		(substituted off) 75'
Substitutes:
GK	13	(Spain) Kepa Arrizabalaga
DF	5	(Ecuador) Piero Hincapié		(substituted on) 60'
MF	10	(England) Eberechi Eze		(substituted on) 84'
MF	23	(Spain) Mikel Merino
MF	36	(Spain) Martín Zubimendi		(substituted on) 75'
MF	41	(England) Declan Rice		(substituted on) 46'
FW	7	(England) Bukayo Saka		(substituted on) 60'
FW	14	(Sweden) Viktor Gyökeres		(substituted on) 75'
FW	56	(England) Max Dowman
Manager:
(Spain) Mikel Arteta

GK	1	(Italy) Gianluigi Donnarumma
RB	45	(Uzbekistan) Abdukodir Khusanov
CB	3	(Portugal) Rúben Dias (c)
CB	24	(Croatia) Joško Gvardiol	(yellow card) 53'
LB	33	(England) Nico O'Reilly		(substituted off) 54'
CM	5	(England) Elliot Anderson		(substituted off) 60'
CM	8	(Croatia) Mateo Kovačić		(substituted off) 79'
RW	42	(Ghana) Antoine Semenyo
AM	47	(England) Phil Foden	(yellow card) 24'	(substituted off) 60'
LW	11	(Belgium) Jérémy Doku		(substituted off) 46'
CF	9	(Norway) Erling Haaland		(substituted off) 53'
Substitutes:
GK	28	(Argentina) Gerónimo Rulli
DF	6	(England) Marc Guéhi		(substituted on) 54'
DF	21	(Algeria) Rayan Aït-Nouri
DF	82	(England) Rico Lewis		(substituted on) 60'
MF	10	(France) Rayan Cherki		(substituted on) 60'
MF	14	(Spain) Nico González		(substituted on) 79'
MF	18	(England) Jack Grealish		(substituted on) 46'
MF	27	(Portugal) Matheus Nunes
FW	7	(Egypt) Omar Marmoush		(substituted on) 53'
Manager:
(Italy) Enzo Maresca

Man of the Match:
Martin Ødegaard (Arsenal)

Assistant referees:
Craig Taylor (Staffordshire)
Blake Antrobus (Manchester)
Fourth official:
Farai Hallam (Surrey)
Reserve assistant referee:
Alistair Nelson (Nottinghamshire)
Video assistant referee:
James Bell (Sheffield & Hallamshire)
Assistant video assistant referee:
Tim Wood (Gloucestershire)

Match rules

- 90 minutes
- Penalty shoot-out if scores level
- Nine named substitutes, of which six may be used

== Broadcasting ==
The match was broadcast in the United Kingdom on TNT Sports 1 and HBO Max.

The match was broadcast in the United States on ESPN
