= Ethan Nwaneri =

English footballer (born 2007)

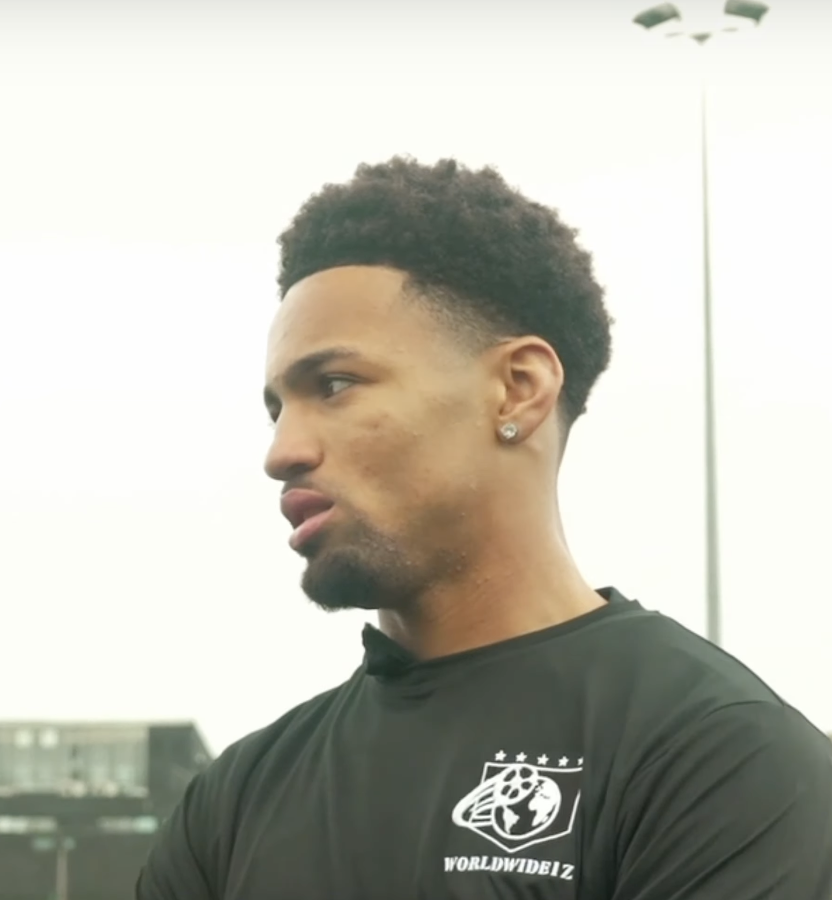
- Nwaneri in 2024

Personal information
- Full name: Ethan Chidiebere Nwaneri
- Date of birth: 21 March 2007 (age 19)
- Place of birth: Islington, England
- Height: 5 ft 9 in (1.76 m)
- Positions: Attacking midfielder; winger

Team information
- Current team: Borussia Dortmund (on loan from Arsenal)
- Number: 18

Youth career
- 2015–2024: Arsenal

Senior career*
Years	Team	Apps	(Gls)
2022–	Arsenal	34	(4)
2026	→ Marseille (loan)	9	(2)
2026–	→ Borussia Dortmund (loan)	7	(0)

International career^{‡}
2022	England U16	6	(1)
2022–2024	England U17	27	(15)
2024–	England U19	9	(6)
2025–	England U21	18	(5)
Medal record
Men's football
Representing England
UEFA European Under-21 Championship
Winner	2025 Slovakia
- * Club domestic league appearances and goals as of 19:39, 11 November 2026 (UTC) ‡ National team caps and goals as of 22:06, 7 October 2026 (UTC)

Ethan Chidiebere Nwaneri (born 21 March 2007) is an English professional footballer who plays as an attacking midfielder or winger for Bundesliga club Borussia Dortmund, on loan from Premier League club Arsenal, and the England U21 national team.

Born in North London, Nwaneri joined Arsenal's Academy at the age of eight. He made his Premier League debut against Brentford on 18 September 2022, becoming the youngest player to appear in the top flight of English football, at 15 years and 181 days old.

== Early life and education ==
Ethan Nwaneri was born on 21 March 2007 at Whittington Hospital in Islington, London, to a Nigerian father of Igbo origin, and an English-French mother. He attended St John's Senior School in Enfield, North London.

== Club career ==
=== Early career ===
Nwaneri joined Arsenal at the age of eight. By the age of 14, he was already playing for their under-18 side. Nwaneri played alongside friend and teammate Myles Lewis-Skelly at the academy.

=== Arsenal ===
==== 2022–23 season ====
Nwaneri started the 2022–23 season playing for Arsenal under-18s, but he quickly advanced to the club's under-21 side. Having made a sole appearance in the 2022–23 Premier League 2, he joined the first team for training in September, and made his first senior matchday squad on 18 September when he was named as a substitute for the Premier League match against Brentford. Coming off the bench to replace Fábio Vieira in second-half stoppage time, he became the youngest player to ever appear in the Premier League at the age of 15 years and 181 days – breaking the record previously held by Harvey Elliott, and the all-time English top-flight record held since August 1964 by former Sunderland goalkeeper Derek Forster, by three days. He also became Arsenal's youngest-ever player in any competition, breaking the previous record of 16 years and 177 days, set by Cesc Fàbregas in the 2003–04 League Cup. In the post-match press conference, manager Mikel Arteta explained that they had to name Nwaneri and two other under-21 players on the bench because the first team had several injuries, especially the injury of midfielder and captain Martin Ødegaard, and a "gut feeling" was behind his decision to send Nwaneri on.

In June 2023, with his schoolboy terms ending, Nwaneri agreed to a new deal with Arsenal on scholarship terms with an agreement for a professional contract upon his seventeenth birthday on 21 March 2024.

==== 2023–24 season ====
Nwaneri played as a substitute in the 2023–24 season in the Premier League in Arsenal's 6–0 win away against West Ham United, coming on in the 77th minute. In the post-match press conference, Arteta mentioned "the players on the bench whispering to bring Ethan on, which is a great thing to hear".

==== 2024–25 season ====
On 25 September 2024, Nwaneri scored his first senior goals when he netted a brace against Bolton Wanderers in the third round of the EFL Cup, helping the Gunners to a 5–1 victory. He scored an outside-the-box shot against Preston North End in the following round. He scored his first goal in the Premier League on 23 November in Arsenal's 3–0 win home against Nottingham Forest after getting subbed on in the 82nd-minute. This made him the ninth-youngest goalscorer in the league's history at 17 years, 247 days old.

On 4 January 2025, Nwaneri scored in a 1–1 draw against Brighton & Hove Albion, becoming the third player to score at least five goals in a season before turning 18, following Michael Owen and Wayne Rooney. Later that month, on 29 January, he netted his first UEFA Champions League goal, securing a 2–1 away win over Girona. Four days later, on 2 February, Nwaneri scored the fifth and final goal in a 5–1 win over Manchester City, curling in a stoppage-time strike from just outside the penalty box. Nwaneri was named Man of the Match following his performance against Leicester City, where he hit the woodwork twice and provided an assist for Mikel Merino in the 2–0 victory. On 4 March, Nwaneri scored the second of seven Arsenal goals away at PSV Eindhoven in the Champions League Last-16.

On 19 June 2025, it was announced that Nwaneri was one of six nominees for the PFA Young Player of the Year award.

==== 2025–26 season ====
On 8 August 2025, Nwaneri signed a new long-term contract with Arsenal.

==== Loan to Marseille ====
On 23 January 2026, Nwaneri was loaned to Marseille until the end of the 2025–26 season. The next day, Nwaneri scored 13 minutes into his Marseille debut in a 3–1 victory over Lens.

==== Loan to Borussia Dortmund ====
On 1 September 2026, Bundesliga club Borussia Dortmund brought Nwaneri in on a season-long deal to replace Giannis Konstantelias temporarily, who suffered an ACL injury couple of days earlier.

== International career ==
Nwaneri is eligible to represent Nigeria and France through his parents, but has chosen to represent England at youth level. After starring in qualifying, Nwaneri was named in the England squad for the 2023 UEFA European Under-17 Championship on 17 May 2023. He scored the winner in the opening match against Croatia at Balmazújvárosi Városi Sportpálya.

On 2 November 2023, Nwaneri was included in the England squad for the 2023 FIFA U-17 World Cup. He scored his only goal of the tournament in their opening group game against New Caledonia in Jakarta. Nwaneri also played in the other group fixtures against Iran and Brazil. He came off the bench as a substitute during their round of sixteen defeat against Uzbekistan.

On 20 May 2024, Nwaneri was included in the England squad for the 2024 UEFA European Under-17 Championship. He once again scored in the opening game of the tournament, this time a 4–0 win over France in Larnaca. Nwaneri also scored in a group stage victory over Spain. His third and last goal of the competition came in their quarter-final elimination against Italy.

On his 18th birthday, 21 March 2025, Nwaneri made his England U21 debut as a substitute during a 5–3 defeat to France in Lorient. Just 3 days later he scored his first goal for England U21 in his first full debut to bring England 4–2 victory against Portugal.

Nwaneri was selected for England's squad at the 2025 UEFA European Under-21 Championship, featuring in all six matches, including the final in which the England U21's secured the title for a second consecutive tournament.

On 23 May 2026, it was announced Nwaneri was one of four players (alongside Alex Scott, Josh King and Rio Ngumoha) that would join the senior team for the squad's preparation camp before the 2026 FIFA World Cup. He scored on his unofficial debut during the 6–0 victory against Miami FC which was played behind closed doors on 11 June 2026.

== Career statistics ==
As of match played 7 November 2026

Appearances and goals by club, season and competition
Club	Season	League			National cup (Note: Includes FA Cup, Coupe de France, DFB-Pokal)		League cup (Note: Includes EFL Cup)		Europe		Other		Total	
Club	Season	Division	Apps	Goals	Apps	Goals	Apps	Goals	Apps	Goals	Apps	Goals	Apps	Goals
Arsenal U21	2022–23	—			—		—		—		2 (Note: Appearances in EFL Trophy)	0	2	0
Arsenal U21	2023–24	—			—		—		—		2	0	2	0
Arsenal U21	Total		—		—		—		—		4	0	4	0
Arsenal	2022–23	Premier League	1	0	0	0	0	0	0	0	—		1	0
Arsenal	2023–24	Premier League	1	0	0	0	0	0	0	0	0	0	1	0
Arsenal	2024–25	Premier League	26	4	0	0	4	3	7 (Note: Appearances in UEFA Champions League)	2	—		37	9
Arsenal	2025–26	Premier League	6	0	1	0	2	1	3	0	—		12	1
Arsenal	2026–27	Premier League	0	0	—		—		—		0	0	0	0
Arsenal	Total		34	4	1	0	6	4	10	2	0	0	51	10
Marseille (loan)	2025–26	Ligue 1	9	2	2	0	—		—		—		11	2
Borussia Dortmund (loan)	2026–27	Bundesliga	7	0	1	0	—		4	0	—		12	0
Career total			50	6	4	0	6	4	14	2	4	0	78	12

== Honours ==
Arsenal U21

- FA Youth Cup runner-up: 2022–23

Arsenal

- Premier League: 2025–26

England U21

- UEFA European Under-21 Championship: 2025
