= 2025–26 UEFA Youth League knockout phase =

Europe premier club football tournament

The 2025–26 UEFA Youth League knockout phase began on 3 February 2026 with the round of 32 and concluded with the final on 20 April 2026 at Stade de la Tuilière in Lausanne, Switzerland, to decide the champions of the 2025–26 UEFA Youth League. The top 22 teams from the UEFA Champions League Path as well as 10 winners of the Domestic Champions Path qualified for the knockout phase.

Times are CET/CEST, (Note: CET (UTC+1) for dates up to 28 March 2026 (round of 32 and round of 16), and CEST (UTC+2) for dates thereafter (quarter-finals, semi-finals and final).) as listed by UEFA (local times, if different, are in parentheses).

== Schedule ==
The schedule of the competition was as follows.

Schedule for 2025–26 UEFA Youth League
Phase	Round	Draw date	Match dates
Knockout phase	Round of 32	12 December 2025	3–4 February 2026
Knockout phase	Round of 16	6 February 2026	24–25 February 2026
Knockout phase	Quarter-finals	—N/a	17–18 March 2026
Knockout phase	Semi-finals	—N/a	17 April 2026 Colovray Stadium, Nyon
Knockout phase	Final	—N/a	20 April 2026 Colovray Stadium, Nyon

== Qualified teams ==
The following 32 teams qualified for the knockout phase.

Qualified teams
UEFA Champions League Path	Domestic Champions Path
1. (England) Chelsea; 2. (Portugal) Benfica; 3. (Belgium) Club Brugge; 4. (Spain) Real Madrid; 5. (Spain) Villarreal; 6. (Spain) Athletic Bilbao; 7. (Spain) Atlético Madrid; 8. (Spain) Barcelona; 9. (England) Tottenham Hotspur; 10. (England) Manchester City; 11. (Germany) Borussia Dortmund; 12. (Portugal) Sporting CP; 13. (France) Paris Saint-Germain; 14. (Italy) Inter Milan; 15. (Netherlands) Ajax; 16. (England) Liverpool; 17. (Germany) Bayer Leverkusen; 18. (France) Monaco; 19. (Netherlands) PSV Eindhoven; 20. (Czech Republic) Slavia Prague; 21. (Germany) Eintracht Frankfurt; 22. (France) Marseille	(Netherlands) AZ; (Spain) Real Betis; (Belarus) Dinamo Minsk; (Ukraine) Dynamo Kyiv; (Finland) HJK; (Germany) 1. FC Köln; (Poland) Legia Warsaw; (Israel) Maccabi Haifa; (Hungary) Puskás Akadémia; (Slovakia) Žilina

== Bracket ==
Round of 32
(Germany) 1. FC Köln	1
(Italy) Inter Milan	3
(Spain) Real Betis	5
(England) Tottenham Hotspur	1
(Portugal) Benfica	3
(Czech Republic) Slavia Prague	2
(Netherlands) AZ	4
(Germany) Borussia Dortmund	0
(Ukraine) Dynamo Kyiv	2
(Spain) Atlético Madrid	6
(Israel) Maccabi Haifa (p)	2 (3)
(Spain) Barcelona	2 (1)
(Slovakia) Žilina	2
(England) Liverpool	1
(Belgium) Club Brugge	3
(France) Monaco	2
(Spain) Real Madrid	5
(France) Marseille	2
(England) Chelsea (p)	1 (7)
(Netherlands) PSV Eindhoven	1 (6)
(Spain) Athletic Bilbao	2 (3)
(Germany) Eintracht Frankfurt (p)	2 (4)
(Hungary) Puskás Akadémia	1
(Portugal) Sporting CP	2
(Spain) Villarreal	3
(Germany) Bayer Leverkusen	2
(Poland) Legia Warsaw	2
(Netherlands) Ajax	1
(France) Paris Saint-Germain	4
(Belarus) Dinamo Minsk	0
(Finland) HJK (p)	3 (5)
(England) Manchester City	3 (4)

Round of 16
(Italy) Inter Milan	5
(Spain) Real Betis	3
(Portugal) Benfica	6
(Netherlands) AZ	2
(Spain) Atlético Madrid (p)	1 (5)
(Israel) Maccabi Haifa	1 (3)
(Slovakia) Žilina	0
(Belgium) Club Brugge	1
(Spain) Real Madrid	1
(England) Chelsea	0
(Germany) Eintracht Frankfurt	0
(Portugal) Sporting CP	1
(Spain) Villarreal	2
(Poland) Legia Warsaw	1
(France) Paris Saint-Germain	6
(Finland) HJK	1

Quarter-finals
(Italy) Inter Milan	2
(Portugal) Benfica	3
(Spain) Atlético Madrid	0
(Belgium) Club Brugge	4
(Spain) Real Madrid	2
(Portugal) Sporting CP	1
(Spain) Villarreal	0
(France) Paris Saint-Germain	1

Semi-finals
17 April – Lausanne
(Portugal) Benfica	1
(Belgium) Club Brugge	3
17 April – Lausanne
(Spain) Real Madrid (p)	1 (5)
(France) Paris Saint-Germain	1 (4)

Final
20 April – Lausanne
(Belgium) Club Brugge	1 (2)
(Spain) Real Madrid (p)	1 (4)

== Round of 32 ==
The draw for the round of 32 was held on 12 December 2025.

=== Seeding ===
In the draw, the top 6 teams from the UEFA Champions League Path were seeded and paired against the teams finished in 17th to 22nd place, while the 10 Domestic Champions Path winners were seeded and paired against teams ranked 7th to 16th. The seeded teams will play the matches at home. In the draw, teams from the same national association could not be drawn against each other. To create the ties, teams finishing 1st to 16th in the UEFA Champions League Path were automatically allocated to the tie corresponding to their position in the final standings, with their unseeded (pairings 1 to 6) or seeded (pairings 7 to 16) opponents then drawn.

Draw pots
Pairings 1 to 6		Pairings 7 to 16	
Seeded	Unseeded (Bowl 1)	Seeded (Bowl 2)	Unseeded
(England) Chelsea; (Portugal) Benfica; (Belgium) Club Brugge; (Spain) Real Madrid; (Spain) Villarreal; (Spain) Athletic Bilbao	(Germany) Bayer Leverkusen; (France) Monaco; (Netherlands) PSV Eindhoven; (Czech Republic) Slavia Prague; (Germany) Eintracht Frankfurt; (France) Marseille	(Netherlands) AZ; (Spain) Real Betis; (Belarus) Dinamo Minsk; (Ukraine) Dynamo Kyiv; (Finland) HJK; (Germany) 1. FC Köln; (Poland) Legia Warsaw; (Israel) Maccabi Haifa; (Hungary) Puskás Akadémia; (Slovakia) Žilina	(Spain) Atlético Madrid; (Spain) Barcelona; (England) Tottenham Hotspur; (England) Manchester City; (Germany) Borussia Dortmund; (Portugal) Sporting CP; (France) Paris Saint-Germain; (Italy) Inter Milan; (Netherlands) Ajax; (England) Liverpool

=== Summary ===
The matches were played on 3 and 4 February 2026.

Round of 32
Home team	Score	Away team
Chelsea (England)	1–1 (7–6 p)	(Netherlands) PSV Eindhoven
Benfica (Portugal)	3–2	(Czech Republic) Slavia Prague
Club Brugge (Belgium)	3–2	(France) Monaco
Real Madrid (Spain)	5–2	(France) Marseille
Villarreal (Spain)	3–2	(Germany) Bayer Leverkusen
Athletic Bilbao (Spain)	2–2 (3–4 p)	(Germany) Eintracht Frankfurt
Dynamo Kyiv (Ukraine)	2–6	(Spain) Atlético Madrid
Maccabi Haifa (Israel)	2–2 (3–1 p)	(Spain) Barcelona
Real Betis (Spain)	5–1	(England) Tottenham Hotspur
HJK (Finland)	3–3 (5–4 p)	(England) Manchester City
AZ (Netherlands)	4–0	(Germany) Borussia Dortmund
Puskás Akadémia (Hungary)	1–2	(Portugal) Sporting CP
Paris Saint-Germain (France)	4–0	(Belarus) Dinamo Minsk
1. FC Köln (Germany)	1–3	(Italy) Inter Milan
Legia Warsaw (Poland)	2–1	(Netherlands) Ajax
Žilina (Slovakia)	2–1	(England) Liverpool

=== Matches ===
3 February 2026
17:00

Chelsea (England)	1–1	(Netherlands) PSV Eindhoven
Kavuma-McQueen 36'	Report	Bouhoudane 43'
Penalties
Murray-Campbell (penalty scored); Harrison (penalty scored); Cardoso (penalty missed); Derry (penalty scored); Watson (penalty scored); McMahon (penalty scored); Emenalo (penalty scored); Subuloye (penalty scored)	7–6	(penalty scored) Bouhamdi; (penalty scored) Van Nistelrooij; (penalty missed) Holseter-Karlsen; (penalty scored) Bahaty; (penalty scored) Bouhoudane; (penalty scored) Khaderi; (penalty scored) Jonkers; (penalty missed) Van der Plas

Chelsea Football Club Training Ground, Surrey
Attendance: 205
Referee: Edgars Maļcevs (Latvia)

4 February 2026
15:00

Benfica (Portugal)	3–2	(Czech Republic) Slavia Prague
Freitas 26'; Moreira 61'; Umeh 76'	Report	Suleiman 13', 55'

Futebol Campus, Seixal
Attendance: 372
Referee: Menelaos Antoniou (Cyprus)

3 February 2026
15:00

Club Brugge (Belgium)	3–2	(France) Monaco
Jensen 41', 70'; Goemaere 50' (pen.)	Report	Dodo 8'; Nibombe 31'

The NEST, Roeselare
Attendance: 643
Referee: Joakim Östling (Sweden)

3 February 2026
15:00

Real Madrid (Spain)	5–2	(France) Marseille
Pitarch 17'; Doubal 27' (o.g.); Yañez 53' (pen.); Martínez 80'; Pérez 90'	Report	N'Zinga Pambani 25'; Mmadi 42' (pen.)

Alfredo Di Stéfano, Madrid
Attendance: 639
Referee: Sam Barrott (England)

4 February 2026
15:00

Villarreal (Spain)	3–2	(Germany) Bayer Leverkusen
Adelantado 9'; López 71'; Budesca 73'	Report	Owen 11'; Massek 18'

Mini Estadi de la Ciudad Deportiva del Villarreal, Villarreal
Attendance: 1,712
Referee: Tom Owen (Wales)

3 February 2026
18:00

Athletic Bilbao (Spain)	2–2	(Germany) Eintracht Frankfurt
Oyana 5'; Oyharcabal 45+1'	Report	Eisele 39'; Džanović 81'
Penalties
Pérez (penalty scored); Urzaiz (penalty missed); Quintero (penalty missed); Liceaga (penalty scored); Gift (penalty scored)	3–4	(penalty missed) Iličević; (penalty scored) Džanović; (penalty scored) Oteng-Mensah; (penalty scored) Souza; (penalty scored) Dills

LEZAMA CAMPO 2, Lezama
Attendance: 1,868
Referee: Radoslav Gidzhenov (Bulgaria)

4 February 2026
10:00

Dynamo Kyiv (Ukraine)	2–6	(Spain) Atlético Madrid
Redushko 52', 90'	Report	Esteban 17'; Gil 33'; Gross 55'; Vinatea 69', 74'; Muñoz 79'

Mardan Antalyaspor, Antalya, Turkey (Note: Due to the Russian invasion of Ukraine, Ukrainian teams were required to play their home matches at neutral venues until further notice.)
Referee: Oliver Reitala (Finland)

4 February 2026
16:00

Maccabi Haifa (Israel)	2–2	(Spain) Barcelona
Lusky 70'; Karagola 81'	Report	Arad 39' (o.g.); Fernández 90+1' (pen.)
Penalties
Darzi (penalty scored); Sztejfman (penalty scored); Lusky (penalty missed); Roach (penalty scored)	3–1	(penalty missed) Víctor; (penalty missed) Bonfill; (penalty missed) Kluivert; (penalty scored) Rodríguez

Gyirmóti Stadion, Győr, Hungary (Note: Due to the Gaza war, Israeli teams were required to play their home matches at neutral venues until further notice.)
Attendance: 130
Referee: Patrik Kolarić (Croatia)

4 February 2026
15:00

Real Betis (Spain)	5–1	(England) Tottenham Hotspur
Morante 22'; Marina 26', 45', 59'; N'Agoran 32'	Report	Williams-Barnett 6'

Ciudad Deportiva Luis del Sol, Seville
Attendance: 852
Referee: Marc Nagtegaal (Netherlands)

4 February 2026
15:00

HJK (Finland)	3–3	(England) Manchester City
Palmula 12'; Nylund 39'; Mero 66'	Report	Gray 17'; Heskey 52'; Warhurst 71'
Penalties
Mero (penalty scored); Traore (penalty scored); De Nascimento (penalty scored); Nylund (penalty scored); Zaitra (penalty scored)	5–4	(penalty scored) Heskey; (penalty scored) Gray; (penalty scored) Warhurst; (penalty missed) Noble; (penalty scored) McFarlane

Helsinki Football Stadium, Helsinki
Attendance: 9,121
Referee: Antoni Bandić (Bosnia and Herzegovina)

3 February 2026
13:00

AZ (Netherlands)	4–0	(Germany) Borussia Dortmund
Kovács 7', 50', 90+2'; Bouziane 84'	Report

AZ Training Centre, Wijdewormer
Attendance: 1,100
Referee: Bastien Dechepy (France)

4 February 2026
15:30

Puskás Akadémia (Hungary)	1–2	(Portugal) Sporting CP
Budai 66'	Report	Gonçalves 53'; Lopes 90+4'

Pancho Aréna, Felcsút
Attendance: 650
Referee: Lukasz Kuzma (Poland)

4 February 2026
13:30

Paris Saint-Germain (France)	4–0	(Belarus) Dinamo Minsk
Cordier 18'; Mounguengue 28', 64'; Ayari 60' (pen.)	Report

Campus PSG, Poissy
Attendance: 880
Referee: Lothar D'hondt (Belgium)

4 February 2026
17:00

1. FC Köln (Germany)	1–3	(Italy) Inter Milan
Schenten 80'	Report	Bovio 49'; Zarate 90+7'; Kukulis 90+9'

RheinEnergieStadion, Cologne
Attendance: 50,000
Referee: Stefan Ebner (Austria)

4 February 2026
13:00

Legia Warsaw (Poland)	2–1	(Netherlands) Ajax
Pchełka 43'; Ruszkiewicz 53'	Report	Teuwsen 73'

Marshall Józef Piłsudski's Municipal Stadium of Legia Warsaw, Warsaw
Attendance: 1,226
Referee: Matteo Marcenaro (Italy)

3 February 2026
15:30

Žilina (Slovakia)	2–1	(England) Liverpool
Bzdyl 36'; Kóša 65'	Report	Morrison 4'

Štadión MŠK Žilina, Žilina
Attendance: 10,572
Referee: Mikkel Redder (Denmark)

== Round of 16 ==
=== Summary ===
The draw was conducted on 6 February 2026. The round of 16 was played over one leg on 24 and 25 February 2026.

Round of 16
Home team	Score	Away team
Inter Milan (Italy)	5–3	(Spain) Real Betis
Eintracht Frankfurt (Germany)	0–1	(Portugal) Sporting CP
Benfica (Portugal)	6–2	(Netherlands) AZ
Real Madrid (Spain)	1–0	(England) Chelsea
Žilina (Slovakia)	0–1	(Belgium) Club Brugge
Paris Saint-Germain (France)	6–1	(Finland) HJK
Atlético Madrid (Spain)	1–1 (5–3 p)	(Israel) Maccabi Haifa
Villarreal (Spain)	2–1	(Poland) Legia Warsaw

=== Matches ===
24 February 2026
14:00

Inter Milan (Italy)	5–3	(Spain) Real Betis
Idrissou 2' (pen.), 6', 70'; Mancuso 73'; Marello 90+4'	Report	Morante 32'; Marina 45', 51'

Youth Development Training Center, Milan
Attendance: 668
Referee: Joey Kooij (Netherlands)

24 February 2026
16:00

Eintracht Frankfurt (Germany)	0–1	(Portugal) Sporting CP
	Report	Siljevic 19' (o.g.)

Sportpark Dreieich, Dreieich
Attendance: 1,634
Referee: Sam Barrott (England)

25 February 2026
15:00

Benfica (Portugal)	6–2	(Netherlands) AZ
Souza 2', 24', 38'; Umeh 20'; Moreira 58'; Figueiredo 65'	Report	Kovács 27' (pen.), 75'

Futebol Campus, Seixal
Attendance: 691
Referee: Antoni Bandić (Bosnia and Herzegovina)

25 February 2026
16:00

Real Madrid (Spain)	1–0	(England) Chelsea
Yáñez 9'	Report

Estadio Alfredo Di Stéfano, Madrid
Attendance: 905
Referee: Igor Stojchevski (North Macedonia)

25 February 2026
16:00

Žilina (Slovakia)	0–1	(Belgium) Club Brugge
	Report	Koren 35'

Štadión MŠK Žilina, Žilina
Attendance: 10,572
Referee: Radoslav Gidzhenov (Bulgaria)

25 February 2026
14:00

Paris Saint-Germain (France)	6–1	(Finland) HJK
Ayari 6' (pen.), 16'; Mounguengue 37'; Jangéal 55'; Idder 83'; Khafi 87'	Report	Berisha 63'

Campus PSG, Poissy
Attendance: 1,032
Referee: Miloš Milanović (Serbia)

25 February 2026
16:00

Atlético Madrid (Spain)	1–1	(Israel) Maccabi Haifa
Rajado 4'	Report	Faingezicht 70'
Penalties
Sánchez (penalty scored); Fernández (penalty scored); Obama (penalty scored); Pérez (penalty scored); Rajado (penalty scored)	5–3	(penalty scored) Ratner; (penalty missed) Sztejfman; (penalty scored) Alouk; (penalty scored) Roach

Centro Deportivo Wanda Alcalá de Henares, Madrid
Attendance: 315
Referee: Ishmael Barbara (Malta)

25 February 2026
17:00

Villarreal (Spain)	2–1	(Poland) Legia Warsaw
López 53'; Arjona 88'	Report	Kováčik 90+3' (pen.)

Mini Estadi de la Ciudad Deportiva del Villarreal, Villarreal
Attendance: 1,265
Referee: Edgars Maļcevs (Latvia)

== Quarter-finals ==
=== Summary ===
The draw was conducted on 6 February. The quarter-finals were played over a single leg on 17 and 18 March 2026.

Quarter-finals
Home team	Score	Away team
Inter Milan (Italy)	2–3	(Portugal) Benfica
Atlético Madrid (Spain)	0–4	(Belgium) Club Brugge
Real Madrid (Spain)	2–1	(Portugal) Sporting CP
Villarreal (Spain)	0–1	(France) Paris Saint-Germain

=== Matches ===
18 March 2026
17:00

Inter Milan (Italy)	2–3	(Portugal) Benfica
Zouin 61'; El Mahboubi 88'	Report	Coletta 26'; Freitas 58'; Silva 77'

Youth Development Training Center, Milan
Attendance: 703
Referee: Oleksii Derevinskyi (Ukraine)

17 March 2026
15:00

Atlético Madrid (Spain)	0–4	(Belgium) Club Brugge
	Report	Musuayi 5', 27'; Koren 23'; Bisiwu 90+5'

Centro Deportivo Wanda Alcalá de Henares, Madrid
Attendance: 473
Referee: Patrik Kolarić (Croatia)

18 March 2026
18:00

Real Madrid (Spain)	2–1	(Portugal) Sporting CP
Ortega 51'; Martín 63'	Report	Gonçalves 43'

Estadio Alfredo Di Stéfano, Madrid
Attendance: 924
Referee: Lothar D'hondt (Belgium)

17 March 2026
17:00

Villarreal (Spain)	0–1	(France) Paris Saint-Germain
	Report	Ly 26'

Mini Estadi de la Ciudad Deportiva del Villarreal, Villarreal
Attendance: 2,360
Referee: Florian Badstübner (Germany)

== Semi-finals ==
=== Summary ===
The draw was conducted on 6 February 2026. The semi-finals were played over a single leg on 17 April 2026.

Semi-finals
Team 1	Score	Team 2
Benfica (Portugal)	1–3	(Belgium) Club Brugge
Real Madrid (Spain)	1–1 (5–4 p)	(France) Paris Saint-Germain

=== Matches ===
17 April 2026
14:00

Benfica (Portugal)	1–3	(Belgium) Club Brugge
Verlinden 90+2' (o.g.)	Report	Goemaere 37'; Garcia 57'; Musuayi 67'

Stade de la Tuilière, Lausanne
Attendance: 3,403
Referee: Joey Kooij (Netherlands)

17 April 2026
18:45

Real Madrid (Spain)	1–1	(France) Paris Saint-Germain
Navascués 83'	Report	Ly 29'
Penalties
Ciria (penalty missed); Yáñez (penalty scored); Díez (penalty missed); Barroso (penalty scored); Ortega (penalty scored); Navascués (penalty scored); Martínez (penalty scored)	5–4	(penalty scored) Jangeal; (penalty scored) El Nay; (penalty missed) Assab; (penalty missed) Khafi; (penalty scored) Nsoki; (penalty scored) Mounguengue; (penalty missed) Mbemba

Stade de la Tuilière, Lausanne
Attendance: 7,003
Referee: Sam Barrott (England)

== Final ==
The final was played on 20 April 2026 at Stade de la Tuilière, Lausanne.

20 April 2026
18:45

Club Brugge (Belgium)	1–1	(Spain) Real Madrid
Jensen 64'	Report	Ortega 23'
Penalties
Goemaere (penalty scored); Amengai (penalty missed); Musuayi (penalty scored); Koren (penalty missed)	2–4	(penalty scored) Navascues; (penalty scored) Yáñez; (penalty scored) Díez; (penalty scored) Aguado

Stade de la Tuilière, Lausanne
Attendance: 5,405
Referee: Rohit Saggi (Norway)
