= 2025–26 UEFA Youth League =

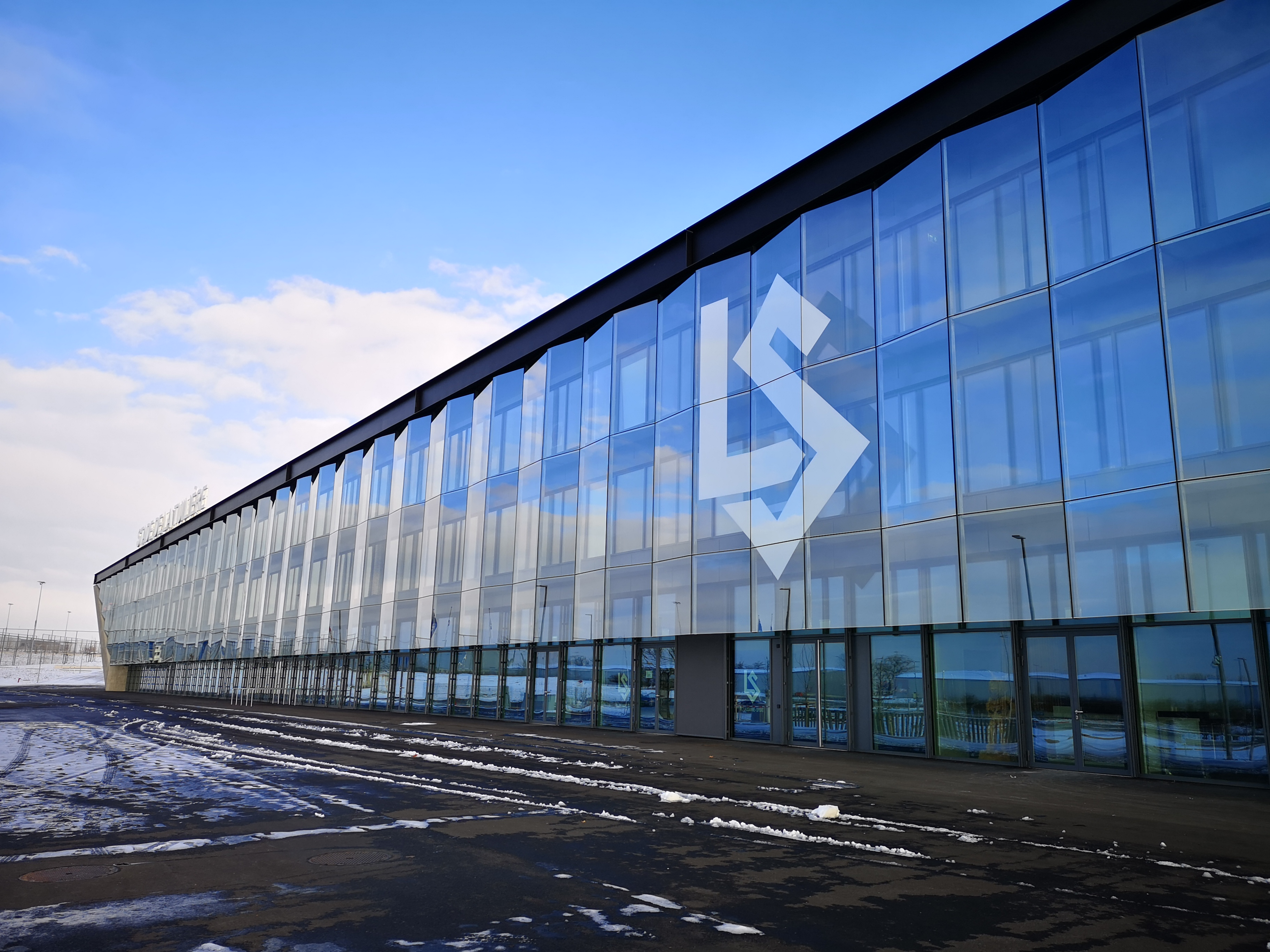
- The Stade de la Tuilière in Lausanne hosted the semi-finals and final

Tournament details
- Dates: 16 September 2025 – 20 April 2026
- Teams: 86 (from 50 associations)

Final positions
- Champions: (Spain) Real Madrid (2nd title)
- Runners-up: (Belgium) Club Brugge

Tournament statistics
- Matches played: 216
- Goals scored: 845 (3.91 per match)
- Top scorer(s): (Spain) Rodrigo Marina (Real Betis); 10 goals

The 2025–26 UEFA Youth League was the twelfth season of the UEFA Youth League, a European youth club football competition organised by UEFA.

The title holders were Barcelona, who defeated Trabzonspor 4–1 in the previous edition's final. They were eliminated in the round of 32 by Maccabi Haifa.

Real Madrid won their second title by beating Club Brugge 4–2 on penalties after a 1–1 draw in the final.

== Teams ==
A total of 86 teams from 50 of the 55 UEFA member associations entered the tournament. They were split into two sections.

- UEFA Champions League Path: The youth teams of the 36 clubs which qualified for the 2025–26 UEFA Champions League league phase entered the UEFA Champions League Path. If there had been a vacancy (youth teams not entering), it would have been filled by a team defined by UEFA.
- Domestic Champions Path: The youth domestic champions of all UEFA associations entered the Domestic Champions Path, with the exception of 5 teams. (Note: Liechtenstein and San Marino do not have a youth domestic competition; Armenia and Moldova did not enter; Russia were suspended from UEFA competitions) Clubs from the top 30 associations according to their 2025 UEFA country coefficients qualified for the second round, with the remaining 20 teams starting from the first round. If the youth domestic champions qualify for the UEFA Champions League path, their spot was filled by the youth domestic runners-ups; if the runners-ups also qualify for the UEFA Champions League path, the vacancy was not filled.

Qualified teams for 2025–26 UEFA Youth League
Rank	Association	Teams	
Rank	Association	UEFA Champions League Path	Domestic Champions Path
1	England	Liverpool; Arsenal; Manchester City; Chelsea; Newcastle United; Tottenham Hotspur	Aston Villa (2024–25 U18 Premier League)
2	Italy	Inter Milan; Juventus; Atalanta; Napoli	Fiorentina (2024–25 Campionato Primavera 1)
3	Spain	Barcelona; Real Madrid; Atlético Madrid; Athletic Bilbao; Villarreal	Real Betis (2024–25 Copa de Campeones Juvenil de Fútbol)
4	Germany	Bayern Munich; Borussia Dortmund; Bayer Leverkusen; Eintracht Frankfurt	1. FC Köln (2024–25 U19-DFB-Nachwuchsliga)
5	France	Paris Saint-Germain; Monaco; Marseille	Nantes (2024–25 Championnat National U19)
6	Netherlands	PSV Eindhoven; Ajax	AZ (2024–25 Eredivisie U18)
7	Portugal	Sporting CP; Benfica	Porto (2024–25 Campeonato Nacional Juniores S19)
8	Belgium	Union Saint-Gilloise: Club Brugge	Genk (2024–25 Belgian U18 League)
9	Turkey	Galatasaray	Trabzonspor (2024–25 U19 Elit)
10	Czech Republic	Slavia Prague	Baník Ostrava (2024–25 Czech U19 League)
11	Scotland		Hibernian (2024–25 Scottish U18 League)
12	Switzerland		Basel (2024–25 Swiss U18 League)
13	Austria		Austria Wien (2024–25 Jugendliga U18)
14	Norway	Bodø/Glimt	Brann (2024 Norwegian U19 Cup)
15	Greece	Olympiacos	PAOK (2024–25 Superleague Greece Youth Cup)
16	Denmark	Copenhagen	Midtjylland (2024–25 U19 Ligaen)
17	Israel		Maccabi Haifa (2024–25 Israeli U19 Noar Premier League)
18	Ukraine		Dynamo Kyiv (2024–25 Ukrainian Premier League Under-19)
19	Serbia		Red Star Belgrade (2024–25 Serbian U19 League)
20	Croatia		Lokomotiva Zagreb (2024–25 1. HNL Juniori U19)
21	Poland		Legia Warsaw (2024–25 Polish U19 Central Junior League)
23	Cyprus	Pafos	AEK Larnaca (2024–25 Cypriot U19 League)
24	Hungary		Puskás Akadémia (2024–25 Hungarian U19 League)
25	Sweden		Brommapojkarna (2024 P17 Allsvenskan)
26	Romania		FCSB (2024–25 Liga de Tineret)
27	Bulgaria		Ludogorets Razgrad (2024–25 U18 BFU Cup)
28	Azerbaijan	Qarabağ	Sabah (2024–25 Azerbaijani U19 League)
29	Slovakia		Žilina (2024–25 Slovak U19 League)
30	Slovenia		Bravo (2024–25 Slovenian U19 League)
32	Kosovo		2 Korriku
33	Kazakhstan	Kairat	Ordabasy (2024 Kazakhstan U18 League)
34	Finland		HJK (2024 U17 B-Junior League)
35	Republic of Ireland		Shelbourne
37	Latvia		Jelgava
38	Faroe Islands		Víkingur
39	Bosnia and Herzegovina		Zrinjski Mostar (2024–25 Bosnia and Herzegovina U19 Junior League)
41	Iceland		KA
42	Northern Ireland		Larne
43	Luxembourg		Racing Union
44	Lithuania		Be1 (2024 Lithuanian Elite Youth League U19 Division)
45	Malta		Naxxar Lions
46	Georgia		Dinamo Tbilisi
47	Albania		Skënderbeu
48	Estonia		Narva Trans
49	Belarus		Dinamo Minsk (2024 Belarusian U18 League)
50	North Macedonia		Rabotnichki
51	Andorra		Inter Club d'Escaldes
52	Wales		Haverfordwest County
53	Montenegro		Budućnost Podgorica
54	Gibraltar		Lincoln Red Imps

Associations without any participating teams (no teams qualified for UEFA Champions League league phase, and either with no youth domestic competition)

Rank	Association
22	Russia
31	Moldova
36	Armenia
40	Liechtenstein
55	San Marino

Notes

1. ^{TH} Title holders.
2. ^{RU} Youth domestic runners-up playing in the Domestic Champions Path because the domestic champions qualified for the UEFA Champions League Path.
3. ^{YC} Teams playing in the UEFA Champions League Path which were also youth domestic champions.
4. ^{PO} Teams playing in the UEFA Champions League Path after their senior team qualified for the Champions League league phase via play-offs.
5. Russia (RUS): On 28 February 2022, Russian football clubs and national teams were suspended from FIFA and UEFA competitions due to the Russian invasion of Ukraine. The tables reflect Russia's ongoing suspension from UEFA competitions.

=== Distribution ===
Path	Round	Teams entering in this round	Teams advancing from the previous round
UEFA Champions League Path (36 teams)	League phase (36 teams)	36 youth teams whose senior sides qualified for the Champions League league phase	
Domestic Champions Path (50 teams)	First round (20 teams)	20 youth champions from associations 33-54 (except Armenia, Liechtenstein, Moldova, and San Marino)	
Domestic Champions Path (50 teams)	Second round (40 teams)	30 youth champions from associations 1-32 (except Russia, and Moldova)	10 winners from the first round
Domestic Champions Path (50 teams)	Third round (20 teams)		20 winners from the second round
Knockout phase (32 teams)			22 teams ranked 1-22 from the league phase (UEFA Champions League Path); 10 winners from the third round (Domestic Champions Path)

As the Youth League title holders (Barcelona) qualified for Champions League Path via their senior side, the following changes to the default access list were made:

== Schedule ==
The schedule of the competition was as follows.

- For the UEFA Champions League Path league stage, in principle the teams played their matches on Tuesdays and Wednesdays of the matchdays as scheduled for UEFA Champions League, and on the same day as the corresponding senior teams; however, matches could also be played on other dates, including Mondays and Thursdays.
- For the Domestic Champions Path first and second rounds, in principle matches were played on Wednesdays (first round on matchdays 2 and 3, second round on matchdays 4 and 5, as scheduled for UEFA Champions League); however, matches could also be played on other dates, including Mondays, Tuesdays and Thursdays.

Schedule for 2025–26 UEFA Youth League
Phase	Round	Draw date	First leg	Second leg
UEFA Champions League Path	Matchday 1	28 August 2025	16–18 September 2025	
UEFA Champions League Path	Matchday 2	28 August 2025	30 September – 1 October 2025	
UEFA Champions League Path	Matchday 3	28 August 2025	21–22 October 2025	
UEFA Champions League Path	Matchday 4	28 August 2025	4–5 November 2025	
UEFA Champions League Path	Matchday 5	28 August 2025	25–26 November 2025	
UEFA Champions League Path	Matchday 6	28 August 2025	9–10 December 2025	
Domestic; Champions Path	First round	1 September 2025	17 September 2025	1 October 2025
Domestic; Champions Path	Second round	1 September 2025	22 October 2025	5 November 2025
Domestic; Champions Path	Third round	1 September 2025	26 November 2025	10 December 2025
Knockout phase	Round of 32	12 December 2025	3–4 February 2026	
Knockout phase	Round of 16	6 February 2026	24–25 February 2026	
Knockout phase	Quarter-finals	—N/a	17–18 March 2026	
Knockout phase	Semi-finals	—N/a	17 April 2026, Stade de la Tuilière, Lausanne	
Knockout phase	Final	—N/a	20 April 2026, Stade de la Tuilière, Lausanne	

== UEFA Champions League Path ==
For the UEFA Champions League Path, the 36 teams played six matches (three home and three away) following the same schedule as the first six matchdays of the 2025–26 UEFA Champions League league phase. The top 22 teams advanced to the knockout phase.

=== Table ===
Pos	Team	Pld	W	D	L	GF	GA	GD	Pts	Qualification
1	(The Football Association) Chelsea	6	5	1	0	23	9	+14	16	Advance to knockout phase
2	(Portuguese Football Federation) Benfica	6	5	0	1	26	7	+19	15	Advance to knockout phase
3	(Royal Belgian Football Association) Club Brugge	6	5	0	1	11	3	+8	15	Advance to knockout phase
4	(Royal Spanish Football Federation) Real Madrid	6	5	0	1	14	7	+7	15	Advance to knockout phase
5	(Royal Spanish Football Federation) Villarreal	6	5	0	1	12	7	+5	15	Advance to knockout phase
6	(Royal Spanish Football Federation) Athletic Bilbao	6	4	2	0	17	7	+10	14	Advance to knockout phase
7	(Royal Spanish Football Federation) Atlético Madrid	6	4	1	1	16	8	+8	13	Advance to knockout phase
8	(Royal Spanish Football Federation) Barcelona	6	4	1	1	13	9	+4	13	Advance to knockout phase
9	(The Football Association) Tottenham Hotspur	6	4	0	2	28	14	+14	12	Advance to knockout phase
10	(The Football Association) Manchester City	6	4	0	2	18	8	+10	12	Advance to knockout phase
11	(German Football Association) Borussia Dortmund	6	4	0	2	13	8	+5	12	Advance to knockout phase
12	(Portuguese Football Federation) Sporting CP	6	3	3	0	13	10	+3	12	Advance to knockout phase
13	(French Football Federation) Paris Saint-Germain	6	3	2	1	17	8	+9	11	Advance to knockout phase
14	(Italian Football Federation) Inter Milan	6	3	2	1	14	8	+6	11	Advance to knockout phase
15	(Royal Dutch Football Association) Ajax	6	3	1	2	24	16	+8	10	Advance to knockout phase
16	(The Football Association) Liverpool	6	3	1	2	8	13	−5	10	Advance to knockout phase
17	(German Football Association) Bayer Leverkusen	6	3	1	2	9	16	−7	10	Advance to knockout phase
18	(French Football Federation) Monaco	6	3	0	3	20	10	+10	9	Advance to knockout phase
19	(Royal Dutch Football Association) PSV Eindhoven	6	2	2	2	13	9	+4	8	Advance to knockout phase
20	(Football Association of the Czech Republic) Slavia Prague	6	2	2	2	16	17	−1	8	Advance to knockout phase
21	(German Football Association) Eintracht Frankfurt	6	2	1	3	15	13	+2	7	Advance to knockout phase
22	(French Football Federation) Marseille	6	2	1	3	12	11	+1	7	Advance to knockout phase
23	(Danish Football Association) Copenhagen	6	2	1	3	10	10	0	7	
24	(Hellenic Football Federation) Olympiacos	6	2	1	3	8	10	−2	7	
25	(Italian Football Federation) Napoli	6	1	3	2	3	6	−3	6	
26	(Italian Football Federation) Juventus	6	1	2	3	12	11	+1	5	
27	(German Football Association) Bayern Munich	6	1	1	4	10	16	−6	4	
28	(Kazakhstan Football Federation) Kairat	6	1	1	4	8	15	−7	4	
29	(Italian Football Federation) Atalanta	6	1	1	4	6	13	−7	4	
30	(Cyprus Football Association) Pafos	6	1	1	4	5	15	−10	4	
31	(Royal Belgian Football Association) Union Saint-Gilloise	6	1	1	4	7	18	−11	4	
32	(Turkish Football Federation) Galatasaray	6	1	1	4	6	21	−15	4	
33	(The Football Association) Arsenal	6	1	0	5	11	18	−7	3	
34	(The Football Association) Newcastle United	6	0	0	6	6	17	−11	0	
35	(Norwegian Football Federation) Bodø/Glimt	6	0	0	6	4	31	−27	0	
36	(Association of Football Federations of Azerbaijan) Qarabağ	6	0	0	6	1	30	−29	0	

Source: UEFA
Rules for classification: League phase tiebreakers

=== Results ===
Matchday 1
Home team	Score	Away team
Benfica (Portugal)	7–1	(Azerbaijan) Qarabağ
Athletic Bilbao (Spain)	3–1	(England) Arsenal
Juventus (Italy)	2–3	(Germany) Borussia Dortmund
Tottenham Hotspur (England)	5–3	(Spain) Villarreal
PSV Eindhoven (Netherlands)	6–2	(Belgium) Union Saint-Gilloise
Real Madrid (Spain)	3–2	(France) Marseille
Olympiacos (Greece)	4–0	(Cyprus) Pafos
Slavia Prague (Czech Republic)	5–0	(Norway) Bodø/Glimt
Paris Saint‑Germain (France)	5–1	(Italy) Atalanta
Ajax (Netherlands)	1–1	(Italy) Inter Milan
Bayern Munich (Germany)	2–3	(England) Chelsea
Liverpool (England)	0–0	(Spain) Atlético Madrid
Club Brugge (Belgium)	1–0	(France) Monaco
Copenhagen (Denmark)	0–2	(Germany) Bayer Leverkusen
Eintracht Frankfurt (Germany)	4–0	(Turkey) Galatasaray
Sporting CP (Portugal)	3–2	(Kazakhstan) Kairat
Manchester City (England)	2–0	(Italy) Napoli
Newcastle United (England)	2–3	(Spain) Barcelona

Matchday 2
Home team	Score	Away team
Kairat (Kazakhstan)	1–4	(Spain) Real Madrid
Bodø/Glimt (Norway)	0–6	(England) Tottenham Hotspur
Pafos (Cyprus)	0–3	(Germany) Bayern Munich
Atalanta (Italy)	0–2	(Belgium) Club Brugge
Galatasaray (Turkey)	0–2	(England) Liverpool
Marseille (France)	3–5	(Netherlands) Ajax
Inter Milan (Italy)	2–2	(Czech Republic) Slavia Prague
Chelsea (England)	5–2	(Portugal) Benfica
Atlético Madrid (Spain)	2–1	(Germany) Eintracht Frankfurt
Villarreal (Spain)	1–0	(Italy) Juventus
Qarabağ (Azerbaijan)	0–5	(Denmark) Copenhagen
Arsenal (England)	1–2	(Greece) Olympiacos
Bayer Leverkusen (Germany)	3–2	(Netherlands) PSV Eindhoven
Napoli (Italy)	1–1	(Portugal) Sporting CP
Union Saint-Gilloise (Belgium)	2–0	(England) Newcastle United
Monaco (France)	3–5	(England) Manchester City
Borussia Dortmund (Germany)	0–4	(Spain) Athletic Bilbao
Barcelona (Spain)	2–1	(France) Paris Saint-Germain

Matchday 3
Home team	Score	Away team
Kairat (Kazakhstan)	1–3	(Cyprus) Pafos
Barcelona (Spain)	3–0	(Greece) Olympiacos
Villarreal (Spain)	2–1	(England) Manchester City
Arsenal (England)	3–4	(Spain) Atlético Madrid
Bayer Leverkusen (Germany)	2–2	(France) Paris Saint-Germain
PSV Eindhoven (Netherlands)	0–0	(Italy) Napoli
Union Saint-Gilloise (Belgium)	1–2	(Italy) Inter Milan
Copenhagen (Denmark)	0–2	(Germany) Borussia Dortmund
Newcastle United (England)	1–5	(Portugal) Benfica
Galatasaray (Turkey)	3–2	(Norway) Bodø/Glimt
Athletic Bilbao (Spain)	3–0	(Azerbaijan) Qarabağ
Chelsea (England)	6–3	(Netherlands) Ajax
Atalanta (Italy)	2–0	(Czech Republic) Slavia Prague
Eintracht Frankfurt (Germany)	4–5	(England) Liverpool
Monaco (France)	2–4	(England) Tottenham Hotspur
Sporting CP (Portugal)	2–1	(France) Marseille
Real Madrid (Spain)	1–0	(Italy) Juventus
Bayern Munich (Germany)	0–3	(Belgium) Club Brugge

Matchday 4
Home team	Score	Away team
Bodø/Glimt (Norway)	0–7	(France) Monaco
Napoli (Italy)	0–0	(Germany) Eintracht Frankfurt
Slavia Prague (Czech Republic)	5–1	(England) Arsenal
Paris Saint-Germain (France)	3–0	(Germany) Bayern Munich
Tottenham Hotspur (England)	2–3	(Denmark) Copenhagen
Liverpool (England)	0–4	(Spain) Real Madrid
Juventus (Italy)	2–2	(Portugal) Sporting CP
Atlético Madrid (Spain)	5–0	(Belgium) Union Saint-Gilloise
Olympiacos (Greece)	2–2	(Netherlands) PSV Eindhoven
Benfica (Portugal)	5–0	(Germany) Bayer Leverkusen
Qarabağ (Azerbaijan)	0–5	(England) Chelsea
Pafos (Cyprus)	0–2	(Spain) Villarreal
Ajax (Netherlands)	7–2	(Turkey) Galatasaray
Marseille (France)	0–0	(Italy) Atalanta
Club Brugge (Belgium)	2–0	(Spain) Barcelona
Manchester City (England)	0–3	(Germany) Borussia Dortmund
Inter Milan (Italy)	3–0	(Kazakhstan) Kairat
Newcastle United (England)	2–3	(Spain) Athletic Bilbao

Matchday 5
Home team	Score	Away team
Bodø/Glimt (Norway)	2–6	(Italy) Juventus
Galatasaray (Turkey)	1–1	(Belgium) Union Saint-Gilloise
Ajax (Netherlands)	0–4	(Portugal) Benfica
Slavia Prague (Czech Republic)	3–3	(Spain) Athletic Bilbao
Chelsea (England)	1–1	(Spain) Barcelona
Napoli (Italy)	2–0	(Azerbaijan) Qarabağ
Marseille (France)	2–0	(England) Newcastle United
Manchester City (England)	6–0	(Germany) Bayer Leverkusen
Borussia Dortmund (Germany)	1–2	(Spain) Villarreal
Pafos (Cyprus)	0–3	(France) Monaco
Copenhagen (Denmark)	2–2	(Kazakhstan) Kairat
Arsenal (England)	4–2	(Germany) Bayern Munich
Eintracht Frankfurt (Germany)	3–2	(Italy) Atalanta
Sporting CP (Portugal)	2–1	(Belgium) Club Brugge
Paris Saint-Germain (France)	5–2	(England) Tottenham Hotspur
Liverpool (England)	1–0	(Netherlands) PSV Eindhoven
Atlético Madrid (Spain)	4–1	(Italy) Inter Milan
Olympiacos (Greece)	0–2	(Spain) Real Madrid

Matchday 6
Home team	Score	Away team
Kairat (Kazakhstan)	2–0	(Greece) Olympiacos
Bayern Munich (Germany)	3–3	(Portugal) Sporting CP
Atalanta (Italy)	1–3	(England) Chelsea
Tottenham Hotspur (England)	9–1	(Czech Republic) Slavia Prague
PSV Eindhoven (Netherlands)	3–1	(Spain) Atlético Madrid
Union Saint-Gilloise (Belgium)	1–4	(France) Marseille
Monaco (France)	5–0	(Turkey) Galatasaray
Inter Milan (Italy)	5–0	(England) Liverpool
Barcelona (Spain)	4–3	(Germany) Eintracht Frankfurt
Benfica (Portugal)	3–0	(Italy) Napoli
Villarreal (Spain)	2–0	(Denmark) Copenhagen
Qarabağ (Azerbaijan)	0–8	(Netherlands) Ajax
Athletic Bilbao (Spain)	1–1	(France) Paris Saint-Germain
Bayer Leverkusen (Germany)	2–1	(England) Newcastle United
Juventus (Italy)	2–2	(Cyprus) Pafos
Club Brugge (Belgium)	2–1	(England) Arsenal
Borussia Dortmund (Germany)	4–0	(Norway) Bodø/Glimt
Real Madrid (Spain)	0–4	(England) Manchester City

== Domestic Champions Path ==
For the Domestic Champions Path, the 50 teams were drawn into three rounds of two-legged home-and-away ties, with the 30 clubs from the top ranked associations starting directly from the second round. The draw for all three rounds were held on 1 September 2025.

The ten third round winners advanced to the round of 32.

=== First round ===
The first legs were played on 17, 18 and 26 September, and the second legs on 30 September and 1 October 2025.

The winners of the ties advanced to the second round.

First round
Team 1	Agg.	Team 2	1st leg	2nd leg
Ordabasy (Kazakhstan)	1–3	(Belarus) Dinamo Minsk	1–1	0–2
Zrinjski Mostar (Bosnia and Herzegovina)	1–4	(Georgia (country)) Dinamo Tbilisi	1–1	0–3
Shelbourne (Republic of Ireland)	12–1	(North Macedonia) Rabotnichki	5–0	7–1
Larne (Northern Ireland)	3–3 (4–5 p)	(Luxembourg) Racing Union	2–0	1–3
Haverfordwest (Wales)	3–5	(Montenegro) Budućnost Podgorica	2–3	1–2
FK Be1 (Lithuania)	1–5	(Finland) HJK Helsinki	1–1	0–4
Narva Trans (Estonia)	2–4	(Faroe Islands) Víkingur	1–0	1–4
FK Jelgava (Latvia)	2–3	(Iceland) Akureyri	2–2	0–1
Inter Club d'Escaldes (Andorra)	0–15	(Albania) Skënderbeu	0–10	0–5
Naxxar Lions (Malta)	1–6	(Gibraltar) Lincoln Red Imps	0–2	1–4

=== Second round ===
The first legs were played on 21, 22 & 23 October and 1 November, and the second legs on 4 & 5 November 2025.

The winners of the ties advanced to the third round.

Second round
Team 1	Agg.	Team 2	1st leg	2nd leg
Dinamo Minsk (Belarus)	2–1	(Bulgaria) Ludogorets Razgrad	0–1	2–0
AEK Larnaca (Cyprus)	3–6	(Georgia (country)) Dinamo Tbilisi	3–4	0–2
Bravo (Slovenia)	1–8	(Portugal) Porto	0–4	1–4
Basel (Switzerland)	3–4	(Spain) Real Betis	3–2	0–2
Austria Wien	2–4	(Israel) Maccabi Haifa	1–1	1–3
Nantes (France)	7–1	(Azerbaijan) Sabah	5–0	2–1
Baník Ostrava (Czech Republic)	1–4	(Serbia) Red Star Belgrade	0–0	1–4
Žilina (Slovakia)	2–2 (2–0 p)	(Republic of Ireland) Shelbourne	2–2	0–0
Racing Union (Luxembourg)	1–5	(Germany) 1. FC Köln	0–3	1–2
Midtjylland (Denmark)	8–1	(Montenegro) Budućnost Podgorica	3–0	5–1
HJK Helsinki (Finland)	3–2	(Turkey) Trabzonspor	2–2	1–0
Víkingur (Faroe Islands)	1–11	(Belgium) Genk	0–8	1–3
Akureyri (Iceland)	0–4	(Greece) PAOK	0–2	0–2
Legia Warsaw (Poland)	6–4	(Italy) Fiorentina	4–1	2–3
Lokomotiva Zagreb (Croatia)	4–6	(Romania) FCSB	2–3	2–3
Brann (Norway)	1–1 (1–3 p)	(Hungary) Puskás Akadémia	1–1	0–0
Dynamo Kyiv (Ukraine)	3–1	(Sweden) Brommapojkarna	1–0	2–1
Hibernian (Scotland)	4–1	(Kosovo) 2 Korriku	4–0	0–1
Skënderbeu (Albania)	1–7	(England) Aston Villa	1–1	0–6
AZ (Netherlands)	9–0	(Gibraltar) Lincoln Red Imps	4–0	5–0

=== Third round ===
The first legs were played on 25 & 26 November–5 December, and the second legs on 9 & 10 December 2025.

The winners of the ties advanced to the knockout phase.

Third round
Team 1	Agg.	Team 2	1st leg	2nd leg
Dinamo Minsk (Belarus)	2–2 (4–2 p)	(Georgia (country)) Dinamo Tbilisi	0–2	2–0
Porto (Portugal)	0–9	(Spain) Real Betis	0–4	0–5
Maccabi Haifa (Israel)	4–2	(France) Nantes	1–0	3–2
Red Star Belgrade (Serbia)	3–3 (6–7 p)	(Slovakia) Žilina	3–1	0–2
1. FC Köln (Germany)	5–2	(Denmark) Midtjylland	1–1	4–1
HJK Helsinki (Finland)	3–2	(Belgium) Genk	1–0	2–2
Legia Warsaw (Poland)	4–2	(Greece) PAOK	2–1	2–1
FCSB (Romania)	4–4 (2–4 p)	(Hungary) Puskás Akadémia	1–2	3–2
Dynamo Kyiv (Ukraine)	2–1	(Scotland) Hibernian	1–0	1–1
Aston Villa (England)	3–4	(Netherlands) AZ	2–2	1–2

== Knockout phase ==
The top 22 teams from the UEFA Champions League Path as well as 10 winners of the Domestic Champions Path qualified for the knockout phase, which was played in a single-leg knockout format. For the round of 32, the top six teams from the UEFA Champions League Path were paired against the teams finished in 17th to 22nd place, and the Domestic Champions Path winners were paired against teams ranked 7th to 16th.

=== Bracket ===
Round of 32
(Germany) 1. FC Köln	1
(Italy) Inter Milan	3
(Spain) Real Betis	5
(England) Tottenham Hotspur	1
(Portugal) Benfica	3
(Czech Republic) Slavia Prague	2
(Netherlands) AZ	4
(Germany) Borussia Dortmund	0
(Ukraine) Dynamo Kyiv	2
(Spain) Atlético Madrid	6
(Israel) Maccabi Haifa (p)	2 (3)
(Spain) Barcelona	2 (1)
(Slovakia) Žilina	2
(England) Liverpool	1
(Belgium) Club Brugge	3
(France) Monaco	2
(Spain) Real Madrid	5
(France) Marseille	2
(England) Chelsea (p)	1 (7)
(Netherlands) PSV Eindhoven	1 (6)
(Spain) Athletic Bilbao	2 (3)
(Germany) Eintracht Frankfurt (p)	2 (4)
(Hungary) Puskás Akadémia	1
(Portugal) Sporting CP	2
(Spain) Villarreal	3
(Germany) Bayer Leverkusen	2
(Poland) Legia Warsaw	2
(Netherlands) Ajax	1
(France) Paris Saint-Germain	4
(Belarus) Dinamo Minsk	0
(Finland) HJK (p)	3 (5)
(England) Manchester City	3 (4)

Round of 16
(Italy) Inter Milan	5
(Spain) Real Betis	3
(Portugal) Benfica	6
(Netherlands) AZ	2
(Spain) Atlético Madrid (p)	1 (5)
(Israel) Maccabi Haifa	1 (3)
(Slovakia) Žilina	0
(Belgium) Club Brugge	1
(Spain) Real Madrid	1
(England) Chelsea	0
(Germany) Eintracht Frankfurt	0
(Portugal) Sporting CP	1
(Spain) Villarreal	2
(Poland) Legia Warsaw	1
(France) Paris Saint-Germain	6
(Finland) HJK	1

Quarter-finals
(Italy) Inter Milan	2
(Portugal) Benfica	3
(Spain) Atlético Madrid	0
(Belgium) Club Brugge	4
(Spain) Real Madrid	2
(Portugal) Sporting CP	1
(Spain) Villarreal	0
(France) Paris Saint-Germain	1

Semi-finals
17 April – Lausanne
(Portugal) Benfica	1
(Belgium) Club Brugge	3
17 April – Lausanne
(Spain) Real Madrid (p)	1 (5)
(France) Paris Saint-Germain	1 (4)

Final
20 April – Lausanne
(Belgium) Club Brugge	1 (2)
(Spain) Real Madrid (p)	1 (4)

=== Round of 32 ===
The draw for the round of 32 was held on 12 December 2025.

The matches were played on 3 and 4 February 2026.

Round of 32
Home team	Score	Away team
Chelsea (England)	1–1 (7–6 p)	(Netherlands) PSV Eindhoven
Benfica (Portugal)	3–2	(Czech Republic) Slavia Prague
Club Brugge (Belgium)	3–2	(France) Monaco
Real Madrid (Spain)	5–2	(France) Marseille
Villarreal (Spain)	3–2	(Germany) Bayer Leverkusen
Athletic Bilbao (Spain)	2–2 (3–4 p)	(Germany) Eintracht Frankfurt
Dynamo Kyiv (Ukraine)	2–6	(Spain) Atlético Madrid
Maccabi Haifa (Israel)	2–2 (3–1 p)	(Spain) Barcelona
Real Betis (Spain)	5–1	(England) Tottenham Hotspur
HJK (Finland)	3–3 (5–4 p)	(England) Manchester City
AZ (Netherlands)	4–0	(Germany) Borussia Dortmund
Puskás Akadémia (Hungary)	1–2	(Portugal) Sporting CP
Paris Saint-Germain (France)	4–0	(Belarus) Dinamo Minsk
1. FC Köln (Germany)	1–3	(Italy) Inter Milan
Legia Warsaw (Poland)	2–1	(Netherlands) Ajax
Žilina (Slovakia)	2–1	(England) Liverpool

=== Round of 16 ===
The draw was conducted on 6 February 2026. The round of 16 was played over one leg on 24 and 25 February 2026.

Round of 16
Home team	Score	Away team
Inter Milan (Italy)	5–3	(Spain) Real Betis
Eintracht Frankfurt (Germany)	0–1	(Portugal) Sporting CP
Benfica (Portugal)	6–2	(Netherlands) AZ
Real Madrid (Spain)	1–0	(England) Chelsea
Žilina (Slovakia)	0–1	(Belgium) Club Brugge
Paris Saint-Germain (France)	6–1	(Finland) HJK
Atlético Madrid (Spain)	1–1 (5–3 p)	(Israel) Maccabi Haifa
Villarreal (Spain)	2–1	(Poland) Legia Warsaw

=== Quarter-finals ===
The draw was conducted on 6 February. The quarter-finals were played over a single leg on 17 and 18 March 2026.

Quarter-finals
Home team	Score	Away team
Inter Milan (Italy)	2–3	(Portugal) Benfica
Atlético Madrid (Spain)	0–4	(Belgium) Club Brugge
Real Madrid (Spain)	2–1	(Portugal) Sporting CP
Villarreal (Spain)	0–1	(France) Paris Saint-Germain

=== Semi-finals ===
The draw was conducted on 6 February 2026. The semi-finals were played over a single leg on 17 April 2026.

Semi-finals
Team 1	Score	Team 2
Benfica (Portugal)	1–3	(Belgium) Club Brugge
Real Madrid (Spain)	1–1 (5–4 p)	(France) Paris Saint-Germain

=== Final ===
The final was played on 20 April 2026 at Stade de la Tuilière, Lausanne.

20 April 2026
18:45

Club Brugge (Belgium)	1–1	(Spain) Real Madrid
Jensen 64'	Report	Ortega 23'
Penalties
Goemaere (penalty scored); Amengai (penalty missed); Musuayi (penalty scored); Koren (penalty missed)	2–4	(penalty scored) Navascues; (penalty scored) Yáñez; (penalty scored) Díez; (penalty scored) Aguado

Stade de la Tuilière, Lausanne
Attendance: 5,405
Referee: Rohit Saggi (Norway)

== See also ==
- Under-20 Intercontinental Cup
- 2025–26 UEFA Champions League
