= 2025–26 in Spanish football =

Football in Spain
- Season: 2025–26

Men's football
- La Liga: Barcelona
- Segunda División: Racing Santander
- Copa del Rey: Real Sociedad
- Supercopa: Barcelona

Women's football
- Liga F: Barcelona
- Copa de la Reina: Barcelona
- Supercopa: Barcelona

The 2025–26 season was the 124th season of competitive association football in Spain.

== National team ==
=== Spain national football team ===
==== Friendlies ====
27 March 2026	Spain	3–0	Serbia	Villarreal, Spain
21:00 CET	Oyarzabal 16', 44'; Muñoz 72'	Report		Stadium: Estadio de la Ceramica; Referee: Luis Godinho (Portugal

31 March 2026	Spain	0–0	Egypt	Cornellà de Llobregat, Spain (Note: The match, originally scheduled to be played at the Lusail Stadium, Qatar, was relocated to Spain due to the 2026 Iran war.)
21:00 CEST				Stadium: RCDE Stadium

4 June 2026	Spain	1–1	Iraq	A Coruña, Spain
21:00 CEST	Torres 16'	Report	Doski 27'	Stadium: Estadio Riazor; Attendance: 30,423; Referee: Florian Badstübner (Germany)

8 June 2026	Peru	1–3	Spain	Puebla, Mexico
20:00 CST	Vélez 66'	Report	Oyarzabal 2'; Pedri 32'; Gallese 55' (o.g.)	Stadium: Estadio Cuauhtémoc; Attendance: 45,845; Referee: Fernando Hernández (Mexico)

==== 2026 FIFA World Cup qualification ====
===== Group E =====
Pos	Team	Pld	W	D	L	GF	GA	GD	Pts	Qualification	(Spain national football team)	(Turkey national football team)	(Georgia national football team)	(Bulgaria national football team)
1	Spain	6	5	1	0	21	2	+19	16	Qualification for 2026 FIFA World Cup	—	2–2	2–0	4–0
2	Turkey	6	4	1	1	17	12	+5	13	Advance to play-offs	0–6	—	4–1	2–0
3	Georgia	6	1	0	5	7	15	−8	3		0–4	2–3	—	3–0
4	Bulgaria	6	1	0	5	3	19	−16	3		0–3	1–6	2–1	—

Source: FIFA, UEFA

==== 2026 FIFA World Cup ====
===== 2026 FIFA World Cup Group H =====
Pos	Team	Pld	W	D	L	GF	GA	GD	Pts	Qualification
1	Spain	3	2	1	0	5	0	+5	7	Advance to knockout stage
2	Cape Verde	3	0	3	0	2	2	0	3	Advance to knockout stage
3	Uruguay	3	0	2	1	3	4	−1	2 (Note: Tied on head-to-head result (Saudi Arabia 1–1 Uruguay). Overall goal difference was used as the tiebreaker.)	
4	Saudi Arabia	3	0	2	1	1	5	−4	2	

Source: FIFA
Rules for classification: Group stage tiebreakers
Notes:

15 June 2026	Spain	0–0	Cape Verde	Atlanta, United States
12:00 EDT		Report		Stadium: Mercedes-Benz Stadium; Attendance: 67,640; Referee: Adham Makhadmeh (Jordan)

21 June 2026	Spain	4–0	Saudi Arabia	Atlanta, United States
12:00 EDT	Yamal 10'; Oyarzabal 21', 24'; Al-Tambakti 49' (o.g.)	Report		Stadium: Mercedes-Benz Stadium; Attendance: 68,239; Referee: Raphael Claus (Brazil)

26 June 2026	Uruguay	0–1	Spain	Zapopan, Mexico
18:00 CST		Report	Baena 42'	Stadium: Estadio Akron; Attendance: 45,065; Referee: Ismail Elfath (United States)

===== 2026 FIFA World Cup knockout stage =====
2 July 2026 Round of 32	Spain	3–0	Austria	Inglewood, United States
12:00 PDT	Oyarzabal 36', 89'; Porro 66'	Report		Stadium: SoFi Stadium; Attendance: 70,492; Referee: Glenn Nyberg (Sweden)

6 July 2026 Round of 16	Portugal	0–1	Spain	Arlington, United States
14:00 CDT		Report	Merino 90+1'	Stadium: AT&T Stadium; Attendance: 70,649; Referee: Anthony Taylor (England)

10 July 2026 QF	Spain	2–1	Belgium	Inglewood, United States
12:00 PDT	Fabián 30'; Merino 88'	Report	De Ketelaere 41'	Stadium: SoFi Stadium; Attendance: 70,492; Referee: Michael Oliver (England)

14 July 2026 SF	France	0–2	Spain	Arlington, United States
14:00 CDT		Report	Oyarzabal 22' (pen.); Porro 58'	Stadium: AT&T Stadium; Attendance: 70,176; Referee: Iván Barton (El Salvador)

====== Final ======
July 19, 2026
3:00 p.m. UTC−4

Spain	1–0 (a.e.t.)	Argentina
Torres 106'	(Note: "Spain vs Argentina | Final | FIFA World Cup 2026". FIFA. Retrieved July 19, 2026.; "Match Report – Final – Spain v. Argentina". FIFA. July 19, 2026. Retrieved July 19, 2026.; "Post match summary report – Final – Spain v. Argentina". FIFA. July 20, 2026. Retrieved July 20, 2026.)

MetLife Stadium, East Rutherford
Attendance: 80,663
Referee: Slavko Vinčić (Slovenia)

=== U-20 ===
==== 2025 FIFA U-20 World Cup ====
===== Group C =====
Pos	Team	Pld	W	D	L	GF	GA	GD	Pts	Qualification
1	Morocco	3	2	0	1	4	2	+2	6	Knockout stage
2	Mexico	3	1	2	0	5	4	+1	5	Knockout stage
3	Spain	3	1	1	1	3	4	−1	4	Knockout stage
4	Brazil	3	0	1	2	3	5	−2	1	

Source: FIFA
Rules for classification: Group stage tiebreakers

===== Knockout stage =====
7 October 2025 R16	Ukraine	0–1	Spain	Estadio Elías Figueroa Brander, Valparaíso
16:30		Report	García 24'	Attendance: 5,345; Referee: Jalal Jayed (Morocco)

11 October 2025 QF	Spain	2–3	Colombia	Estadio Fiscal, Talca
17:00	Belaid 56'; Virgili 59'	Report	Villarreal 38', 64', 89'	Attendance: 10,326; Referee: Joe Dickerson (United States)

=== Spain women's national football team ===
==== UEFA Women's Euro 2025 ====
===== UEFA Women's Euro 2025 Group B =====
Pos	Team	Pld	W	D	L	GF	GA	GD	Pts	Qualification
1	Spain	3	3	0	0	14	3	+11	9	Advance to knockout stage
2	Italy	3	1	1	1	3	4	−1	4	Advance to knockout stage
3	Belgium	3	1	0	2	4	8	−4	3	
4	Portugal	3	0	1	2	2	8	−6	1	

Source: UEFA
Rules for classification: Group stage tiebreakers

===== Knockout Stage =====
Final

27 July 2025
18:00

England	1–1 (a.e.t.)	Spain
Russo 57'	Report	Caldentey 25'
Penalties
Mead (penalty missed); Greenwood (penalty scored); Charles (penalty scored); Williamson (penalty missed); Kelly (penalty scored)	3–1	(penalty scored) Guijarro; (penalty missed) Caldentey; (penalty missed) Bonmatí; (penalty missed) Paralluelo

St. Jakob-Park, Basel
Attendance: 34,203
Referee: Stéphanie Frappart (France)

==== 2027 FIFA Women's World Cup qualification ====
===== 2027 FIFA Women's World Cup qualification – UEFA League A Group A3 =====
Pos	Team	Pld	W	D	L	GF	GA	GD	Pts	Qualification or relegation
1	Spain	6	5	0	1	21	3	+18	15	Qualification to 2027 FIFA Women's World Cup
2	England	6	5	0	1	13	5	+8	15	Advance to play-offs
3	Iceland	6	2	0	4	3	12	−9	6	Advance to play-offs
4	Ukraine (R)	6	0	0	6	2	19	−17	0	Advance to play-offs and relegation to League B

Source: UEFA
Rules for classification: Tiebreakers
(R) Relegated

=== U–17 ===
==== FIFA U-17 Women's World Cup ====
===== Group E =====
Pos	Team	Pld	W	D	L	GF	GA	GD	Pts	Qualification
1	Spain	3	3	0	0	12	0	+12	9	Knockout stage
2	Colombia	3	2	0	1	4	4	0	6	Knockout stage
3	South Korea	3	0	1	2	1	7	−6	1	
4	Ivory Coast	3	0	1	2	1	7	−6	1	

Source: FIFA
Rules for classification: Group stage tiebreakers

== UEFA competitions ==
=== UEFA Champions League ===
==== League phase ====
===== Athletic Bilbao =====
Pos	Team	Pld	W	D	L	GF	GA	GD	Pts
27	(Royal Belgian Football Association) Union Saint-Gilloise	8	3	0	5	8	17	−9	9
28	(Royal Dutch Football Association) PSV Eindhoven	8	2	2	4	16	16	0	8
29	(Royal Spanish Football Federation) Athletic Bilbao	8	2	2	4	9	14	−5	8
30	(Italian Football Federation) Napoli	8	2	2	4	9	15	−6	8
31	(Danish Football Association) Copenhagen	8	2	2	4	12	21	−9	8

Source: UEFA
Rules for classification: League phase tiebreakers

Home team	Score	Away team
Athletic Bilbao (Spain)	0–2	(England) Arsenal
Borussia Dortmund (Germany)	4–1	(Spain) Athletic Bilbao
Athletic Bilbao (Spain)	3–1	(Azerbaijan) Qarabağ
Newcastle United (England)	2–0	(Spain) Athletic Bilbao
Slavia Prague (Czech Republic)	0–0	(Spain) Athletic Bilbao
Athletic Bilbao (Spain)	0–0	(France) Paris Saint-Germain
Atalanta (Italy)	2–3	(Spain) Athletic Bilbao
Athletic Bilbao (Spain)	2–3	(Portugal) Sporting CP

===== Atlético Madrid =====
Pos	Team	Pld	W	D	L	GF	GA	GD	Pts	Qualification
12	(The Football Association) Newcastle United	8	4	2	2	17	7	+10	14	Advance to knockout phase play-offs (seeded)
13	(Italian Football Federation) Juventus	8	3	4	1	14	10	+4	13	Advance to knockout phase play-offs (seeded)
14	(Royal Spanish Football Federation) Atlético Madrid	8	4	1	3	17	15	+2	13	Advance to knockout phase play-offs (seeded)
15	(Italian Football Federation) Atalanta	8	4	1	3	10	10	0	13	Advance to knockout phase play-offs (seeded)
16	(German Football Association) Bayer Leverkusen	8	3	3	2	13	14	−1	12	Advance to knockout phase play-offs (seeded)

Source: UEFA
Rules for classification: League phase tiebreakers

Home team	Score	Away team
Liverpool (England)	3–2	(Spain) Atlético Madrid
Atlético Madrid (Spain)	5–1	(Germany) Eintracht Frankfurt
Arsenal (England)	4–0	(Spain) Atlético Madrid
Atlético Madrid (Spain)	3–1	(Belgium) Union Saint-Gilloise
Atlético Madrid (Spain)	2–1	(Italy) Inter Milan
PSV Eindhoven (Netherlands)	2–3	(Spain) Atlético Madrid
Galatasaray (Turkey)	1–1	(Spain) Atlético Madrid
Atlético Madrid (Spain)	1–2	(Norway) Bodø/Glimt

===== Barcelona =====
Pos	Team	Pld	W	D	L	GF	GA	GD	Pts	Qualification
3	(The Football Association) Liverpool	8	6	0	2	20	8	+12	18	Advance to round of 16 (seeded)
4	(The Football Association) Tottenham Hotspur	8	5	2	1	17	7	+10	17	Advance to round of 16 (seeded)
5	(Royal Spanish Football Federation) Barcelona	8	5	1	2	22	14	+8	16	Advance to round of 16 (seeded)
6	(The Football Association) Chelsea	8	5	1	2	17	10	+7	16	Advance to round of 16 (seeded)
7	(Portuguese Football Federation) Sporting CP	8	5	1	2	17	11	+6	16	Advance to round of 16 (seeded)

Source: UEFA
Rules for classification: League phase tiebreakers

Home team	Score	Away team
Newcastle United (England)	1–2	(Spain) Barcelona
Barcelona (Spain)	1–2	(France) Paris Saint-Germain
Barcelona (Spain)	6–1	(Greece) Olympiacos
Club Brugge (Belgium)	3–3	(Spain) Barcelona
Chelsea (England)	3–0	(Spain) Barcelona
Barcelona (Spain)	2–1	(Germany) Eintracht Frankfurt
Slavia Prague (Czech Republic)	2–4	(Spain) Barcelona
Barcelona (Spain)	4–1	(Denmark) Copenhagen

===== Real Madrid =====
Pos	Team	Pld	W	D	L	GF	GA	GD	Pts	Qualification
7	(Portuguese Football Federation) Sporting CP	8	5	1	2	17	11	+6	16	Advance to round of 16 (seeded)
8	(The Football Association) Manchester City	8	5	1	2	15	9	+6	16	Advance to round of 16 (seeded)
9	(Royal Spanish Football Federation) Real Madrid	8	5	0	3	21	12	+9	15	Advance to knockout phase play-offs (seeded)
10	(Italian Football Federation) Inter Milan	8	5	0	3	15	7	+8	15	Advance to knockout phase play-offs (seeded)
11	(French Football Federation) Paris Saint-Germain	8	4	2	2	21	11	+10	14	Advance to knockout phase play-offs (seeded)

Source: UEFA
Rules for classification: League phase tiebreakers

Home team	Score	Away team
Real Madrid (Spain)	2–1	(France) Marseille
Kairat (Kazakhstan)	0–5	(Spain) Real Madrid
Real Madrid (Spain)	1–0	(Italy) Juventus
Liverpool (England)	1–0	(Spain) Real Madrid
Olympiacos (Greece)	3–4	(Spain) Real Madrid
Real Madrid (Spain)	1–2	(England) Manchester City
Real Madrid (Spain)	6–1	(France) Monaco
Benfica (Portugal)	4–2	(Spain) Real Madrid

===== Villarreal =====
Pos	Team	Pld	W	D	L	GF	GA	GD	Pts
32	(Royal Dutch Football Association) Ajax	8	2	0	6	8	21	−13	6
33	(German Football Association) Eintracht Frankfurt	8	1	1	6	10	21	−11	4
34	(Football Association of the Czech Republic) Slavia Prague	8	0	3	5	5	19	−14	3
35	(Royal Spanish Football Federation) Villarreal	8	0	1	7	5	18	−13	1
36	(Kazakhstan Football Federation) Kairat	8	0	1	7	7	22	−15	1

Source: UEFA
Rules for classification: League phase tiebreakers

Home team	Score	Away team
Tottenham Hotspur (England)	1–0	(Spain) Villarreal
Villarreal (Spain)	2–2	(Italy) Juventus
Villarreal (Spain)	0–2	(England) Manchester City
Pafos (Cyprus)	1–0	(Spain) Villarreal
Borussia Dortmund (Germany)	4–0	(Spain) Villarreal
Villarreal (Spain)	2–3	(Denmark) Copenhagen
Villarreal (Spain)	1–2	(Netherlands) Ajax
Bayer Leverkusen (Germany)	3–0	(Spain) Villarreal

==== Knockout phase ====
===== Knockout phase play-offs =====
Team 1	Agg.	Team 2	1st leg	2nd leg
Benfica (Portugal)	1–3	(Spain) Real Madrid	0–1	1–2
Club Brugge (Belgium)	4–7	(Spain) Atlético Madrid	3–3	1–4

===== Round of 16 =====
Team 1	Agg.	Team 2	1st leg	2nd leg
Real Madrid (Spain)	5–1	(England) Manchester City	3–0	2–1
Newcastle United (England)	3–8	(Spain) Barcelona	1–1	2–7
Atlético Madrid (Spain)	7–5	(England) Tottenham Hotspur	5–2	2–3

===== Quarter-finals =====
Team 1	Agg.	Team 2	1st leg	2nd leg
Real Madrid (Spain)	4–6	(Germany) Bayern Munich	1–2	3–4
Barcelona (Spain)	2–3	(Spain) Atlético Madrid	0–2	2–1

===== Semi-finals =====
Team 1	Agg.	Team 2	1st leg	2nd leg
Atlético Madrid (Spain)		(England) Arsenal	1–1	5 May

=== UEFA Europa League ===
==== League phase ====
===== Celta Vigo =====
Pos	Team	Pld	W	D	L	GF	GA	GD	Pts	Qualification
14	(Football Association of the Czech Republic) Viktoria Plzeň	8	3	5	0	8	3	+5	14	Advance to knockout phase play-offs (seeded)
15	(Football Association of Serbia) Red Star Belgrade	8	4	2	2	7	6	+1	14	Advance to knockout phase play-offs (seeded)
16	(Royal Spanish Football Federation) Celta Vigo	8	4	1	3	15	11	+4	13	Advance to knockout phase play-offs (seeded)
17	(Hellenic Football Federation) PAOK	8	3	3	2	17	14	+3	12	Advance to knockout phase play-offs (unseeded)
18	(French Football Federation) Lille	8	4	0	4	12	9	+3	12	Advance to knockout phase play-offs (unseeded)

Source: UEFA
Rules for classification: League phase tiebreakers

Home team	Score	Away team
VfB Stuttgart (Germany)	2–1	(Spain) Celta Vigo
Celta Vigo (Spain)	3–1	(Greece) PAOK
Celta Vigo (Spain)	2–1	(France) Nice
Dinamo Zagreb (Croatia)	0–3	(Spain) Celta Vigo
Ludogorets Razgrad (Bulgaria)	3–2	(Spain) Celta Vigo
Celta Vigo (Spain)	1–2	(Italy) Bologna
Celta Vigo (Spain)	2–1	(France) Lille
Red Star Belgrade (Serbia)	1–1	(Spain) Celta Vigo

===== Real Betis =====
Pos	Team	Pld	W	D	L	GF	GA	GD	Pts	Qualification
2	(The Football Association) Aston Villa	8	7	0	1	14	6	+8	21	Advance to round of 16 (seeded)
3	(Danish Football Association) Midtjylland	8	6	1	1	18	8	+10	19	Advance to round of 16 (seeded)
4	(Royal Spanish Football Federation) Real Betis	8	5	2	1	13	7	+6	17 (Note: Away goals scored: Real Betis 5, Porto 3.)	Advance to round of 16 (seeded)
5	(Portuguese Football Federation) Porto	8	5	2	1	13	7	+6	17	Advance to round of 16 (seeded)
6	(Portuguese Football Federation) Braga	8	5	2	1	11	5	+6	17	Advance to round of 16 (seeded)

Source: UEFA
Rules for classification: League phase tiebreakers
Notes:

Home team	Score	Away team
Real Betis (Spain)	2–2	(England) Nottingham Forest
Ludogorets Razgrad (Bulgaria)	0–2	(Spain) Real Betis
Genk (Belgium)	0–0	(Spain) Real Betis
Real Betis (Spain)	2–0	(France) Lyon
Real Betis (Spain)	2–1	(Netherlands) Utrecht
Dinamo Zagreb (Croatia)	1–3	(Spain) Real Betis
PAOK (Greece)	2–0	(Spain) Real Betis
Real Betis (Spain)	2–1	(Netherlands) Feyenoord

==== Knockout phase ====
===== Knockout phase play-offs =====
Team 1	Agg.	Team 2	1st leg	2nd leg
PAOK (Greece)	1–3	(Spain) Celta Vigo	1–2	0–1

===== Round of 16 =====
Team 1	Agg.	Team 2	1st leg	2nd leg
Panathinaikos (Greece)	1–4	(Spain) Real Betis	1–0	0–4
Celta Vigo (Spain)	3–1	(France) Lyon	1–1	2–0

===== Quarter-finals =====
Team 1	Agg.	Team 2	1st leg	2nd leg
Braga (Portugal)	5–3	(Spain) Real Betis	1–1	4–2
SC Freiburg (Germany)	6–1	(Spain) Celta Vigo	3–0	3–1

=== UEFA Conference League ===
==== Qualifying round ====
===== Play-off round =====
Play-off round
Team 1	Agg.	Team 2	1st leg	2nd leg
Neman Grodno (Belarus)	0–5	(Spain) Rayo Vallecano	0–1	0–4

==== League phase ====
===== Rayo Vallecano =====
Pos	Team	Pld	W	D	L	GF	GA	GD	Pts	Qualification
3	(Hellenic Football Federation) AEK Athens	6	4	1	1	14	7	+7	13	Advance to round of 16 (seeded)
4	(Football Association of the Czech Republic) Sparta Prague	6	4	1	1	10	3	+7	13	Advance to round of 16 (seeded)
5	(Royal Spanish Football Federation) Rayo Vallecano	6	4	1	1	13	7	+6	13	Advance to round of 16 (seeded)
6	(Ukrainian Association of Football) Shakhtar Donetsk	6	4	1	1	10	5	+5	13	Advance to round of 16 (seeded)
7	(German Football Association) Mainz 05	6	4	1	1	7	3	+4	13	Advance to round of 16 (seeded)

Source: UEFA
Rules for classification: League phase tiebreakers

Home team	Score	Away team
Rayo Vallecano (Spain)	2–0	(North Macedonia) Shkëndija
BK Häcken (Sweden)	2–2	(Spain) Rayo Vallecano
Rayo Vallecano (Spain)	3–2	(Poland) Lech Poznań
Slovan Bratislava (Slovakia)	2–1	(Spain) Rayo Vallecano
Jagiellonia Białystok (Poland)	1–2	(Spain) Rayo Vallecano
Rayo Vallecano (Spain)	3–0	(Kosovo) Drita

==== Knockout phase ====
===== Round of 16 =====
Team 1	Agg.	Team 2	1st leg	2nd leg
Samsunspor (Turkey)	2–3	(Spain) Rayo Vallecano	1–3	1–0

===== Quarter-finals =====
Team 1	Agg.	Team 2	1st leg	2nd leg
Rayo Vallecano (Spain)	4–3	(Greece) AEK Athens	3–0	1–3

===== Semi-finals =====
Team 1	Agg.	Team 2	1st leg	2nd leg
Rayo Vallecano (Spain)	2–0	(France) Strasbourg	1–0	1–0

===== Final =====
27 May 2026
21:00 UTC+2

Crystal Palace (The Football Association)	1–0	(Royal Spanish Football Federation) Rayo Vallecano
Mateta 51'	Report

Red Bull Arena, Leipzig
Attendance: 39,176
Referee: Maurizio Mariani (Italy)

=== UEFA Women's Champions League ===
==== Third qualifying round ====
Third qualifying round
Team 1	Agg.	Team 2	1st leg	2nd leg
BK Häcken (Sweden)	2–3	(Spain) Atlético Madrid	1–1	1–2 (a.e.t.)
Eintracht Frankfurt (Germany)	1–5	(Spain) Real Madrid	1–2	0–3

==== League stage ====
===== Atlético Madrid =====
Pos	Team	Pld	W	D	L	GF	GA	GD	Pts	Qualification
9	(German Football Association) VfL Wolfsburg	6	3	0	3	13	10	+3	9	Advance to the knockout phase play-offs (unseeded)
10	(French Football Federation) Paris FC	6	2	2	2	6	9	−3	8	Advance to the knockout phase play-offs (unseeded)
11	(Royal Spanish Football Federation) Atlético Madrid	6	2	1	3	13	9	+4	7	Advance to the knockout phase play-offs (unseeded)
12	(Royal Belgian Football Association) OH Leuven	6	1	3	2	5	10	−5	6	Advance to the knockout phase play-offs (unseeded)
13	(Norwegian Football Federation) Vålerenga	6	1	1	4	4	9	−5	4	

Source: UEFA
Rules for classification: League phase tiebreakers

Home team	Score	Away team
St. Pölten (Austria)	0–6	(Spain) Atlético Madrid
Atlético Madrid (Spain)	0–1	(England) Manchester United
Atlético Madrid (Spain)	1–2	(Italy) Juventus
Twente (Netherlands)	0–4	(Spain) Atlético Madrid
Atlético Madrid (Spain)	2–2	(Germany) Bayern Munich
Lyon (France)	4–0	(Spain) Atlético Madrid

===== Barcelona =====
Pos	Team	Pld	W	D	L	GF	GA	GD	Pts	Qualification
1	(Royal Spanish Football Federation) Barcelona	6	5	1	0	20	3	+17	16	Advance to the quarter-finals (seeded)
2	(French Football Federation) OL Lyonnes	6	5	1	0	18	5	+13	16	Advance to the quarter-finals (seeded)
3	(The Football Association) Chelsea	6	4	2	0	20	3	+17	14	Advance to the quarter-finals (seeded)
4	(German Football Association) Bayern Munich	6	4	1	1	14	13	+1	13	Advance to the quarter-finals (seeded)
5	(The Football Association) Arsenal	6	4	0	2	11	6	+5	12	Advance to the knockout phase play-offs (seeded)

Source: UEFA
Rules for classification: League phase tiebreakers

Home team	Score	Away team
Barcelona (Spain)	7–1	(Germany) Bayern Munich
Roma (Italy)	0–4	(Spain) Barcelona
Barcelona (Spain)	3–0	(Belgium) OH Leuven
Chelsea (England)	1–1	(Spain) Barcelona
Barcelona (Spain)	3–1	(Portugal) Benfica
Paris FC (France)	0–2	(Spain) Barcelona

===== Real Madrid =====
Pos	Team	Pld	W	D	L	GF	GA	GD	Pts	Qualification
5	(The Football Association) Arsenal	6	4	0	2	11	6	+5	12	Advance to the knockout phase play-offs (seeded)
6	(The Football Association) Manchester United	6	4	0	2	7	9	−2	12	Advance to the knockout phase play-offs (seeded)
7	(Royal Spanish Football Federation) Real Madrid	6	3	2	1	13	7	+6	11	Advance to the knockout phase play-offs (seeded)
8	(Italian Football Federation) Juventus	6	3	1	2	13	8	+5	10	Advance to the knockout phase play-offs (seeded)
9	(German Football Association) VfL Wolfsburg	6	3	0	3	13	10	+3	9	Advance to the knockout phase play-offs (unseeded)

Source: UEFA
Rules for classification: League phase tiebreakers

Home team	Score	Away team
Real Madrid (Spain)	6–2	(Italy) Roma
Paris Saint-Germain (France)	1–2	(Spain) Real Madrid
Real Madrid (Spain)	1–1	(France) Paris FC
Arsenal (England)	2–1	(Spain) Real Madrid
Real Madrid (Spain)	2–0	(Germany) VfL Wolfsburg
Twente (Netherlands)	1–1	(Spain) Real Madrid

==== Knockout phase ====
===== Knockout phase play-offs =====
Team 1	Agg.	Team 2	1st leg	2nd leg
Atlético Madrid (Spain)	0–5	(England) Manchester United	0–3	0–2
Paris FC (France)	2–5	(Spain) Real Madrid	2–3	0–2

===== Quarter-finals =====
Team 1	Agg.	Team 2	1st leg	2nd leg
Real Madrid (Spain)	2–12	(Spain) Barcelona	2–6	0–6

===== Semi-finals =====
Team 1	Agg.	Team 2	1st leg	2nd leg
Bayern Munich (Germany)	3–5	(Spain) Barcelona	1–1	2–4

===== Final =====
23 May 2026
18:00 UTC+2

Barcelona (Spain)	4–0	(France) OL Lyonnes
Pajor 55', 69'; Paralluelo 90', 90+3'	Report

Ullevaal Stadion, Oslo
Attendance: 24,258
Referee: Tess Olofsson (Sweden)

=== UEFA Youth League ===
==== UEFA Champions League Path ====
===== Athletic Bilbao =====
Pos	Team	Pld	W	D	L	GF	GA	GD	Pts	Qualification
4	(Royal Spanish Football Federation) Real Madrid	6	5	0	1	14	7	+7	15	Advance to knockout phase
5	(Royal Spanish Football Federation) Villarreal	6	5	0	1	12	7	+5	15	Advance to knockout phase
6	(Royal Spanish Football Federation) Athletic Bilbao	6	4	2	0	17	7	+10	14	Advance to knockout phase
7	(Royal Spanish Football Federation) Atlético Madrid	6	4	1	1	16	8	+8	13	Advance to knockout phase
8	(Royal Spanish Football Federation) Barcelona	6	4	1	1	13	9	+4	13	Advance to knockout phase

Source: UEFA
Rules for classification: League phase tiebreakers

Home team	Score	Away team
Athletic Bilbao (Spain)	3–1	(England) Arsenal
Borussia Dortmund (Germany)	0–4	(Spain) Athletic Bilbao
Athletic Bilbao (Spain)	3–0	(Azerbaijan) Qarabağ
Newcastle United (England)	2–3	(Spain) Athletic Bilbao
Slavia Prague (Czech Republic)	3–3	(Spain) Athletic Bilbao
Athletic Bilbao (Spain)	1–1	(France) Paris Saint-Germain

===== Atlético Madrid =====
Pos	Team	Pld	W	D	L	GF	GA	GD	Pts	Qualification
5	(Royal Spanish Football Federation) Villarreal	6	5	0	1	12	7	+5	15	Advance to knockout phase
6	(Royal Spanish Football Federation) Athletic Bilbao	6	4	2	0	17	7	+10	14	Advance to knockout phase
7	(Royal Spanish Football Federation) Atlético Madrid	6	4	1	1	16	8	+8	13	Advance to knockout phase
8	(Royal Spanish Football Federation) Barcelona	6	4	1	1	13	9	+4	13	Advance to knockout phase
9	(The Football Association) Tottenham Hotspur	6	4	0	2	28	14	+14	12	Advance to knockout phase

Source: UEFA
Rules for classification: League phase tiebreakers

Home team	Score	Away team
Liverpool (England)	0–0	(Spain) Atlético Madrid
Atlético Madrid (Spain)	2–1	(Germany) Eintracht Frankfurt
Arsenal (England)	3–4	(Spain) Atlético Madrid
Atlético Madrid (Spain)	5–0	(Belgium) Union Saint-Gilloise
Atlético Madrid (Spain)	4–1	(Italy) Inter Milan
PSV Eindhoven (Netherlands)	3–1	(Spain) Atlético Madrid

===== Barcelona =====
Pos	Team	Pld	W	D	L	GF	GA	GD	Pts	Qualification
6	(Royal Spanish Football Federation) Athletic Bilbao	6	4	2	0	17	7	+10	14	Advance to knockout phase
7	(Royal Spanish Football Federation) Atlético Madrid	6	4	1	1	16	8	+8	13	Advance to knockout phase
8	(Royal Spanish Football Federation) Barcelona	6	4	1	1	13	9	+4	13	Advance to knockout phase
9	(The Football Association) Tottenham Hotspur	6	4	0	2	28	14	+14	12	Advance to knockout phase
10	(The Football Association) Manchester City	6	4	0	2	18	8	+10	12	Advance to knockout phase

Source: UEFA
Rules for classification: League phase tiebreakers

Home team	Score	Away team
Newcastle United (England)	2–3	(Spain) Barcelona
Barcelona (Spain)	2–1	(France) Paris Saint-Germain
Barcelona (Spain)	3–0	(Greece) Olympiacos
Club Brugge (Belgium)	2–0	(Spain) Barcelona
Chelsea (England)	1–1	(Spain) Barcelona
Barcelona (Spain)	4–3	(Germany) Eintracht Frankfurt

===== Real Madrid =====
Pos	Team	Pld	W	D	L	GF	GA	GD	Pts	Qualification
2	(Portuguese Football Federation) Benfica	6	5	0	1	26	7	+19	15	Advance to knockout phase
3	(Royal Belgian Football Association) Club Brugge	6	5	0	1	11	3	+8	15	Advance to knockout phase
4	(Royal Spanish Football Federation) Real Madrid	6	5	0	1	14	7	+7	15	Advance to knockout phase
5	(Royal Spanish Football Federation) Villarreal	6	5	0	1	12	7	+5	15	Advance to knockout phase
6	(Royal Spanish Football Federation) Athletic Bilbao	6	4	2	0	17	7	+10	14	Advance to knockout phase

Source: UEFA
Rules for classification: League phase tiebreakers

Home team	Score	Away team
Real Madrid (Spain)	3–2	(France) Marseille
Kairat (Kazakhstan)	1–4	(Spain) Real Madrid
Real Madrid (Spain)	1–0	(Italy) Juventus
Liverpool (England)	0–4	(Spain) Real Madrid
Olympiacos (Greece)	0–2	(Spain) Real Madrid
Real Madrid (Spain)	0–4	(England) Manchester City

===== Villarreal =====
Pos	Team	Pld	W	D	L	GF	GA	GD	Pts	Qualification
3	(Royal Belgian Football Association) Club Brugge	6	5	0	1	11	3	+8	15	Advance to knockout phase
4	(Royal Spanish Football Federation) Real Madrid	6	5	0	1	14	7	+7	15	Advance to knockout phase
5	(Royal Spanish Football Federation) Villarreal	6	5	0	1	12	7	+5	15	Advance to knockout phase
6	(Royal Spanish Football Federation) Athletic Bilbao	6	4	2	0	17	7	+10	14	Advance to knockout phase
7	(Royal Spanish Football Federation) Atlético Madrid	6	4	1	1	16	8	+8	13	Advance to knockout phase

Source: UEFA
Rules for classification: League phase tiebreakers

Home team	Score	Away team
Tottenham Hotspur (England)	5–3	(Spain) Villarreal
Villarreal (Spain)	1–0	(Italy) Juventus
Villarreal (Spain)	2–1	(England) Manchester City
Pafos (Cyprus)	0–2	(Spain) Villarreal
Borussia Dortmund (Germany)	1–2	(Spain) Villarreal
Villarreal (Spain)	2–0	(Denmark) Copenhagen

==== Domestic Champions Path ====
===== Second round =====
Team 1	Agg.	Team 2	1st leg	2nd leg
Basel (Switzerland)	3–4	(Spain) Real Betis	3–2	0–2

===== Third round =====
Team 1	Agg.	Team 2	1st leg	2nd leg
Porto (Portugal)	0–9	(Spain) Real Betis	0–4	0–5

==== Knockout phase ====
===== Round of 32 =====
Round of 32
Home team	Score	Away team
Real Madrid (Spain)	5–2	(France) Marseille
Villarreal (Spain)	3–2	(Germany) Bayer Leverkusen
Athletic Bilbao (Spain)	2–2 (3–4 p)	(Germany) Eintracht Frankfurt
Dynamo Kyiv (Ukraine)	2–6	(Spain) Atlético Madrid
Maccabi Haifa (Israel)	2–2 (3–1 p)	(Spain) Barcelona
Real Betis (Spain)	5–1	(England) Tottenham Hotspur

===== Round of 16 =====
Round of 16
Home team	Score	Away team
Inter Milan (Italy)	5–3	(Spain) Real Betis
Real Madrid (Spain)	1–0	(England) Chelsea
Atlético Madrid (Spain)	1–1 (5–3 p)	(Israel) Maccabi Haifa
Villarreal (Spain)	2–1	(Poland) Legia Warsaw

===== Quarter-finals =====
Quarter-finals
Home team	Score	Away team
Atlético Madrid (Spain)	0–4	(Belgium) Club Brugge
Real Madrid (Spain)	2–1	(Portugal) Sporting CP
Villarreal (Spain)	0–1	(France) Paris Saint-Germain

===== Semi-finals =====
Home team	Score	Away team
Real Madrid (Spain)	1–1 (5–4 p)	(France) Paris Saint-Germain

===== Final =====
The final was played on 20 April 2026 at Stade de la Tuilière, Lausanne.

20 April 2026
18:45

Club Brugge (Belgium)	1–1	(Spain) Real Madrid
Jensen 64'	Report	Ortega 23'
Penalties
Goemaere (penalty scored); Amengai (penalty missed); Musuayi (penalty scored); Koren (penalty missed)	2–4	(penalty scored) Navascues; (penalty scored) Yáñez; (penalty scored) Díez; (penalty scored) Aguado

Stade de la Tuilière, Lausanne
Attendance: 5,405
Referee: Rohit Saggi (Norway)

== Men's football ==
=== League season ===
==== La Liga ====
Pos	Team	Pld	W	D	L	GF	GA	GD	Pts	Qualification or relegation
1	Barcelona (C)	38	31	1	6	95	36	+59	94	Qualification for the Champions League league phase (Note: La Liga gained an additional Champions League place as a result of Spain gaining one of the two European Performance Spots (EPS) awarded to the two associations with the highest UEFA coefficient points in 2025–26.)
2	Real Madrid	38	27	5	6	77	35	+42	86	Qualification for the Champions League league phase
3	Villarreal	38	22	6	10	72	46	+26	72	Qualification for the Champions League league phase
4	Atlético Madrid	38	21	6	11	62	44	+18	69	Qualification for the Champions League league phase
5	Real Betis	38	15	15	8	59	48	+11	60	Qualification for the Champions League league phase
6	Celta Vigo	38	14	12	12	53	48	+5	54	Qualification for the Europa League league phase
7	Getafe	38	15	6	17	32	38	−6	51	Qualification for the Conference League play-off round
8	Rayo Vallecano	38	12	14	12	41	44	−3	50	
9	Valencia	38	13	10	15	46	55	−9	49	
10	Real Sociedad	38	11	13	14	59	61	−2	46 (Note: Tied on head-to-head points and goal difference. Real Sociedad placed ahead of Espanyol on overall goal difference.)	Qualification for the Europa League league phase (Note: Real Sociedad qualified for the Europa League league phase as the 2025–26 Copa del Rey winners.)
11	Espanyol	38	12	10	16	43	55	−12	46	
12	Athletic Bilbao	38	13	6	19	43	58	−15	45	
13	Sevilla	38	12	7	19	46	60	−14	43 (Note: Head-to-head points: Sevilla 6, Alavés 5, Elche 3.)	
14	Alavés	38	11	10	17	44	56	−12	43	
15	Elche	38	10	13	15	49	57	−8	43	
16	Levante	38	11	9	18	47	61	−14	42 (Note: Head-to-head points: Levante 7, Osasuna 5, Mallorca 3.)	
17	Osasuna	38	11	9	18	44	50	−6	42	
18	Mallorca (R)	38	11	9	18	47	57	−10	42	Relegation to Segunda División
19	Girona (R)	38	9	14	15	39	55	−16	41	Relegation to Segunda División
20	Oviedo (R)	38	6	11	21	26	60	−34	29	Relegation to Segunda División

Source: LaLiga EA Sports
Rules for classification: 1) Points; 2) Head-to-head points; 3) Head-to-head goal difference; 4) Goal difference; 5) Goals scored; 6) Fair-play points
(Note: Head-to-head record is used only after all the matches between the teams in question have been played)
(C) Champions; (R) Relegated

==== Segunda División ====
Pos	Team	Pld	W	D	L	GF	GA	GD	Pts	Qualification or relegation
1	Racing Santander (C, P)	42	25	7	10	90	61	+29	82	Promotion to La Liga
2	Deportivo La Coruña (P)	42	22	11	9	65	44	+21	77	Promotion to La Liga
3	Almería	42	22	8	12	81	63	+18	74	Qualification for promotion play-offs
4	Málaga (O, P)	42	21	10	11	75	52	+23	73 (Note: Málaga finished ahead of Las Palmas on head-to-head points: Málaga 2–0 Las Palmas, Las Palmas 0–1 Málaga.)	Qualification for promotion play-offs
5	Las Palmas	42	20	13	9	57	40	+17	73	Qualification for promotion play-offs
6	Castellón	42	20	12	10	70	51	+19	72 (Note: Castellón finished ahead of Burgos on head-to-head points: Castellón 3–1 Burgos, Burgos 0–0 Castellón.)	Qualification for promotion play-offs
7	Burgos	42	20	12	10	48	33	+15	72	
8	Eibar	42	19	10	13	52	40	+12	67	
9	Córdoba	42	17	10	15	57	61	−4	61 (Note: Tied on head-to-head points. Head-to-head goal difference: Córdoba +1, Sporting Gijón 0, Ceuta –1.)	
10	Sporting Gijón	42	18	7	17	60	54	+6	61	
11	Ceuta	42	17	10	15	51	63	−12	61	
12	Albacete	42	16	11	15	56	55	+1	59	
13	Andorra	42	16	10	16	62	54	+8	58	
14	Granada	42	12	12	18	50	56	−6	48	
15	Real Sociedad B	42	12	11	19	52	61	−9	47	
16	Leganés	42	11	13	18	43	51	−8	46 (Note: Leganés finished ahead of Valladollid on head-to-head points: Leganés 3–0 Valladolid, Valladolid 3–2 Leganés.)	
17	Valladolid	42	12	10	20	44	57	−13	46	
18	Cádiz	42	11	10	21	41	61	−20	43	
19	Mirandés (R)	42	10	10	22	47	69	−22	40	Relegation to Primera Federación
20	Huesca (R)	42	9	11	22	41	63	−22	38	Relegation to Primera Federación
21	Cultural Leonesa (R)	42	9	10	23	39	68	−29	37	Relegation to Primera Federación
22	Zaragoza (R)	42	8	12	22	35	59	−24	36	Relegation to Primera Federación

Source: LaLiga Hypermotion
Rules for classification: 1) Points; 2) Head-to-head points; 3) Head-to-head goal difference; 4) Goal difference; 5) Goals scored; 6) Fair-play points
(Note: Head-to-head record is used only after all the matches between the teams in question have been played)
(C) Champions; (O) Play-off winners; (P) Promoted; (R) Relegated

==== Primera Federación ====
===== Group 1 =====
Pos	Team	Pld	W	D	L	GF	GA	GD	Pts	Qualification
1	Tenerife (C, P)	38	22	10	6	62	24	+38	76	Promotion to Segunda División and qualification for the Copa del Rey
2	Celta Fortuna (O, P)	38	18	11	9	61	48	+13	65	Qualification for the promotion play-offs
3	Zamora	38	17	10	11	53	42	+11	61	Qualification for the promotion play-offs and Copa del Rey
4	Ponferradina	38	17	9	12	43	33	+10	60	Qualification for the promotion play-offs and Copa del Rey
5	Real Madrid Castilla	38	16	10	12	61	52	+9	58 (Note: Head-to-head points: Real Madrid Castilla 7 pts, Pontevedra 7 pts, Barakaldo 3 pts. Real Madrid Castilla finished ahead of Pontevedra on head-to-head points: Real Madrid Castilla 1–0 Pontevedra, Pontevedra 0–0 Real Madrid Castilla)	Qualification for the promotion play-offs
6	Pontevedra	38	14	16	8	49	31	+18	58	Qualification for the Copa del Rey
7	Barakaldo	38	15	13	10	51	38	+13	58	Qualification for the Copa del Rey
8	Unionistas	38	15	11	12	53	49	+4	56	Qualification for the Copa del Rey due to coefficient (Note: As Real Sociedad B were in Segunda División, another spot in the Copa del Rey was vacant, and was given to the non-reserve team of best coefficient between both groups, not already qualified)
9	Lugo	38	13	14	11	36	40	−4	53	
10	Mérida	38	14	10	14	47	53	−6	52 (Note: Mérida finished ahead of Arenas on head-to-head goal difference: Mérida 3–0 Arenas, Arenas 2–0 Mérida)	
11	Arenas	38	15	7	16	46	55	−9	52	
12	Racing Ferrol	38	13	10	15	41	47	−6	49 (Note: Racing Ferrol finished ahead of Bilbao Athletic on overall goal difference)	
13	Bilbao Athletic	38	13	10	15	38	46	−8	49	
14	Avilés	38	11	11	16	55	67	−12	44 (Note: Avilés finished ahead of Cacereño on head-to-head points: Cacereño 0–4 Avilés, Avilés 1–1 Cacereño)	
15	Cacereño	38	10	14	14	42	49	−7	44	
16	Talavera de la Reina (R)	38	11	10	17	38	47	−9	43 (Note: Talavera de la Reina finished ahead of Ourense CF on head-to-head points: Ourense CF 1–2 Talavera de la Reina, Talavera de la Reina 0–0 Ourense CF)	Relegation to Segunda Federación
17	Ourense CF (R)	38	10	13	15	44	47	−3	43	Relegation to Segunda Federación
18	Guadalajara (R)	38	10	11	17	44	58	−14	41	Relegation to Segunda Federación
19	Osasuna B (R)	38	10	10	18	28	42	−14	40	Relegation to Segunda Federación
20	Arenteiro (D, R)	38	6	10	22	29	53	−24	28	Administrative relegation to Tercera Federación (Note: Arenteiro relegated to 2026–27 Tercera Federación due to economic problems.)

Source: RFEF
Rules for classification: 1) points; 2) head-to-head points; 3) head-to-head goal difference; 4) goal difference; 5) number of goals scored
(Note: Head-to-head record is used only after all the matches between the teams in question have been played).
(C) Champions; (D) Disqualified; (O) Play-off winners; (P) Promoted; (R) Relegated

===== Group 2 =====
Pos	Team	Pld	W	D	L	GF	GA	GD	Pts	Qualification
1	Eldense (C, P)	38	19	12	7	57	39	+18	69	Promotion to Segunda División and qualification for the Copa del Rey
2	Sabadell (O, P)	38	18	14	6	53	27	+26	68	Qualification for the promotion play-offs and Copa del Rey
3	Atlético Madrileño	38	19	10	9	64	44	+20	67	Qualification for the promotion play-offs
4	Villarreal B	38	16	15	7	54	32	+22	63	Qualification for the promotion play-offs
5	Europa	38	16	12	10	55	50	+5	60	Qualification for the promotion play-offs and Copa del Rey
6	Cartagena	38	15	12	11	37	38	−1	57	Qualification for the Copa del Rey
7	Antequera	38	16	8	14	47	44	+3	56	Qualification for the Copa del Rey
8	Algeciras	38	15	10	13	40	41	−1	55	
9	Hércules	38	14	12	12	43	41	+2	54	
10	Murcia	38	14	10	14	43	40	+3	52	
11	Alcorcón	38	12	15	11	44	38	+6	51	
12	Ibiza	38	13	11	14	44	38	+6	50	
13	Teruel	38	12	13	13	27	33	−6	49	
14	Gimnàstic	38	13	8	17	40	49	−9	47	
15	Juventud Torremolinos	38	11	13	14	45	51	−6	46	
16	Betis Deportivo (R)	38	12	9	17	48	59	−11	45 (Note: Betis Deportivo finished ahead of Tarazona on head-to-head goal difference: Tarazona 1–0 Betis Deportivo, Betis Deportivo 3–0 Tarazona)	Relegation to Segunda Federación
17	Tarazona (D, R)	38	11	12	15	31	40	−9	45	Administrative relegation to Tercera Federación (Note: Tarazona relegated to 2026–27 Tercera Federación due to economic problems.)
18	Marbella (R)	38	9	7	22	36	55	−19	34	Relegation to Segunda Federación
19	Atlético Sanluqueño (R)	38	7	10	21	27	53	−26	31	Relegation to Segunda Federación
20	Sevilla Atlético (R)	38	5	13	20	20	43	−23	28	Relegation to Segunda Federación

Updated to match(es) played on 24 May 2026. Source: RFEF
Rules for classification: 1) points; 2) head-to-head points; 3) head-to-head goal difference; 4) goal difference; 5) number of goals scored
(Note: Head-to-head record is used only after all the matches between the teams in question have been played)
(C) Champions; (D) Disqualified; (O) Play-off winners; (P) Promoted; (R) Relegated

=== Cup competitions ===
==== Copa del Rey ====
===== Final =====
18 April 2026
21:00 CEST

Atlético Madrid	2–2 (a.e.t.)	Real Sociedad
Lookman 18'; Alvarez 83'	Report	Barrenetxea 1'; Oyarzabal 45+1' (pen.)
Penalties
Sørloth (penalty missed); Alvarez (penalty missed); González (penalty scored); Almada (penalty scored); Baena (penalty scored)	3–4	(penalty scored) Soler; (penalty missed) Óskarsson; (penalty scored) Sučić; (penalty scored) Muñoz; (penalty scored) Marín

La Cartuja, Seville
Attendance: 70,000
Referee: Javier Alberola Rojas

==== Supercopa de España ====
Semi-finals
7 January 2026 – Jeddah
Barcelona	5
Athletic Bilbao	0
8 January 2026 – Jeddah
Atlético Madrid	1
Real Madrid	2

Final
11 January 2026 – Jeddah
Barcelona	3
Real Madrid	2

===== Final =====
11 January 2026
22:00

Barcelona	3–2	Real Madrid
Raphinha 36', 73'; Lewandowski 45+4'	Report	Vinícius 45+2'; G. García 45+6'

King Abdullah Sports City, Jeddah
Attendance: 60,326
Referee: José Luis Munuera Montero (Andalusia)

== Women's football ==
=== League season ===
==== Liga F ====
Pos	Team	Pld	W	D	L	GF	GA	GD	Pts	Qualification or relegation
1	Barcelona (C)	30	29	0	1	130	9	+121	87	Qualification for the Champions League league phase
2	Real Madrid	30	23	3	4	65	18	+47	72	Qualification for the Champions League third qualifying round
3	Real Sociedad	30	20	6	4	61	27	+34	66	Qualification for the Champions League third qualifying round
4	Tenerife	30	14	12	4	49	22	+27	54	
5	Atlético Madrid	30	14	9	7	63	39	+24	51	
6	Granada	30	13	6	11	36	42	−6	45	
7	Athletic Club	30	12	8	10	35	44	−9	44	
8	Sevilla	30	12	5	13	33	46	−13	41	
9	Madrid CFF	30	11	4	15	41	59	−18	37	
10	Badalona Women	30	10	9	11	28	46	−18	36 (Note: The team was given a 3 points deduction, after failing to provide a team's doctor during 6 matches.)	
11	Espanyol	30	7	10	13	28	44	−16	31	
12	Deportivo Abanca	30	8	7	15	34	54	−20	31	
13	Eibar	30	8	4	18	18	47	−29	28	
14	DUX Logroño	30	4	9	17	29	54	−25	21	
15	Alhama (R)	30	3	5	22	23	78	−55	14	Relegation to Primera Federación
16	Levante (R)	30	2	3	25	18	62	−44	9	Relegation to Primera Federación

Updated to match(es) played on 31 May 2026. Source: LigaF.es
Rules for classification: 1) Points; 2) Head-to-head points; 3) Goal difference; 4) Number of goals scored
(C) Champions; (R) Relegated

==== Primera Federación ====
Pos	Team	Pld	W	D	L	GF	GA	GD	Pts	Promotion, qualification or relegation
1	Barcelona B (Note: Reserve team, ineligible for promotion) (C)	26	18	4	4	67	26	+41	58	
2	Alavés (P)	26	17	5	4	44	15	+29	56	Promotion to Liga F
3	Valencia (P)	26	12	10	4	35	18	+17	46	Qualification for Promotion play-offs
4	Real Madrid B	26	12	5	9	35	27	+8	41	
5	Tenerife B	26	11	6	9	34	36	−2	39	
6	Villarreal	26	10	8	8	35	31	+4	38	Qualification for Promotion play-offs
7	Osasuna	26	9	6	11	30	26	+4	33	Qualification for Promotion play-offs
8	Albacete	26	8	9	9	25	33	−8	33	Qualification for Promotion play-offs
9	Cacereño	26	8	7	11	22	33	−11	31	
10	Atlético Madrid B	26	8	7	11	26	32	−6	31	
11	AEM (R)	26	8	6	12	26	36	−10	30	Relegation to Segunda Federación
12	Europa (R)	26	6	5	15	29	47	−18	23	Relegation to Segunda Federación
13	Real Betis (R)	26	5	8	13	24	48	−24	23	Relegation to Segunda Federación
14	Real Oviedo (R)	26	4	6	16	18	42	−24	18	Relegation to Segunda Federación

Source: RFEF
Rules for classification: 1) Points; 2) Head-to-head points; 3) Goal difference; 4) Number of goals scored
(C) Champions; (P) Promoted; (R) Relegated to Segunda Federación

=== Cup competitions ===
==== Copa de la Reina ====
===== Final =====
16 May 2026
20:00 WEST (UTC+1)

Barcelona	3–1	Atlético Madrid
Pina 23'; Brugts 31'; Paralluelo 37'	Report	Bøe Risa 58'

Gran Canaria Stadium, Las Palmas
Attendance: 26,093
Referee: Olatz Rivera Olmedo

==== Supercopa de España ====
Semi-finals
20 January 2026
Real Madrid	3
Atlético Madrid	1
21 January 2026
Barcelona	3
Athletic Club	1

Final
24 January 2026
Barcelona	2
Real Madrid	0

24 January 2026
19:00 CET (UTC+1)

Barcelona	2–0	Real Madrid
Brugts 28'; Putellas 90+3' (pen.)	Report

Nou Estadi Castàlia, Castellón de la Plana
Attendance: 12,593
Referee: Eugenia Gil Soriano
