= Miraash Imthiyaz =

Maldivian footballer (born 1999)

Personal information
- Full name: Mohamed Miraash Imthiyaz
- Date of birth: 11 October 1999 (age 27)
- Place of birth: Maldives
- Height: 1.75 m (5 ft 9 in)
- Position: Winger

Team information
- Current team: CD Montcada

Youth career
- Early Touch Football Academy
- UE Cornellà

Senior career*
Years	Team	Apps	(Gls)
2018–2020	CF Mollet UE	24	(2)
2020–2021	CF Parets	16	(2)
2021–2023	UE Rubí	46	(6)
2023–2025	Unificación Llefià CF		
2025–	CD Montcada	12	(0)

International career^{‡}
2022	Maldives	1	(0)
- * Club domestic league appearances and goals ‡ National team caps and goals as of 17 December 2022

Mohamed Miraash Imthiyaz (Dhivehi: މިރާޝް; born 11 October 1999) is a Maldivian professional footballer who plays as a winger for CD Montcada.

== Early life ==
Imthiyaz was born on 11 October 1999 in the Maldives. Born to a pilot father, he is the older brother of Maldivian footballer Ibrahim Aayan Imthiyaz. A native of Malé, Maldives, he has been nicknamed "Ash".

== Club career ==
As a youth player, Imthitaz joined the youth academy of Maldivian side Early Touch Football Academy. Following his stint there, he joined the youth academy of Spanish side UE Cornellà. During the summer of 2018, he signed for Spanish side CF Mollet UE, where he made twenty-four league appearances and scored two goals and helped the club achieve promotion from the sixth tier to the fifth tier.

Two years later, he signed for Spanish side CF Parets, where he made sixteen league appearances and scored two goals. One year later, he signed for Spanish side UE Rubí, where he made forty-six league appearances and scored six goals. Subsequently, he signed for Spanish side Unificación Llefià CF in 2023. Ahead of the 2025–26 season, he signed for Spanish side CD Montcada.

== International career ==
Imthiyaz is a Maldives international. On 17 December 2022, he debuted for the Maldives during a 1–3 away friendly loss to Singapore.
