= Adam Ayari =

French footballer (born 2008)

Personal information
- Date of birth: 30 March 2008 (age 18)
- Place of birth: Paris, France
- Position: Forward

Team information
- Current team: Paris Saint-Germain

Youth career
- Stade Vernolitain
- 2014–: Paris Saint-Germain

Senior career*
Years	Team	Apps	(Gls)
2026–	Paris Saint-Germain	0	(0)

International career^{‡}
2023–2024	France U16	12	(4)
2024	France U17	3	(0)
2026–	France U19	3	(0)
- * Club domestic league appearances and goals as of 19 May 2026 ‡ National team caps and goals as of 19 May 2026

Adam Ayari (born 30 March 2008) is a French footballer who plays as a forward for Paris Saint-Germain.

== Club career ==
Born in Paris, Ayari first played for Stade Vernolitain in Vernouillet before joining the Paris Saint-Germain Youth Academy in 2014. He started playing with the club's under-19s during the 2025–26 season, becoming one of the most decisive players in both the Championnat National U19, the Coupe Gambardella and the UEFA Youth League. In May 2026, while having visited the Ajax training ground in Amsterdam, he reportedly was close to signing his first professional contract with Paris Saint-Germain. On July 13, 2026, he signed his first professional contract—a four-year deal—with Paris Saint-Germain.

== International career ==
Born in France, Ayari also has Tunisian origins. He is a youth international for France, having played for the under-16, under-17 and under-19.

== Style of play ==
Ayari is a versatile forward, able to play on both wings or even as a centre-forward and attacking midfielder, but preferring the right flank.

== Honours ==
Paris Saint-Germain U19

- Championnat National U19: 2023–24, 2024–25, 2025–26

Paris Saint-Germain U18

- Coupe Gambardella: 2025–26
