= Samuel Gomez Van Hoogen =

Belgian footballer (born 2006)

Personal information
- Date of birth: 24 January 2006 (age 20)
- Place of birth: Wilrijk, Belgium
- Height: 1.84 m (6 ft 0 in)
- Position: Centre-back

Team information
- Current team: Club NXT
- Number: 82

Youth career
- 2012–2014: KVVOG Vorselaar
- 2014–2015: Lierse
- 2015–2016: Genk
- 2016–2017: Lierse
- 2017–2024: PSV

Senior career*
Years	Team	Apps	(Gls)
2024–2025	Jong PSV	14	(0)
2024	PSV	0	(0)
2025–	Club NXT	29	(0)

International career^{‡}
2024	Belgium U18	1	(0)
2024–	Belgium U19	9	(0)
- * Club domestic league appearances and goals as of 20 April 2026 ‡ National team caps and goals as of 01:49, 13 May 2025 (UTC)

Samuel Gomez Van Hoogen (born 24 January 2006) is a Belgian professional footballer who plays as a centre-back for Club NXT.

== Club career ==
Gomez Van Hoogen is a youth product of the Belgian clubs KVVOG Vorselaar, Lierse and Genk, before moving to the academy Dutch club PSV in 2017 to finish his development. On 21 June 2023, he signed a 1+1 year professional contract with PSV. In 2024, he was named captain of PSV's U19's and debuted with PSV's reserves in the Eerste Divisie. He made his senior and professional debut with PSV in a 8–0 KNVB Cup win over Koninklijke on 17 December 2024. On 20 May 2025, it was announced that he would leave PSV and sign with the Belgian club Club Brugge.

== International career ==
Born in Belgium, Gomez Van Hoogen was born to a Spanish father and a Dutch mother. In September 2019, he was called up to the Netherlands U13s. He was called up to a training camp for the Netherlands U17s in September 2022. He played for the Belgium U18s and U19s in 2024.

== Career statistics ==
=== Club ===
As of match played 29 October 2025

Appearances and goals by club, season and competition
Club	Season	League			National cup		Europe		Other		Total	
Club	Season	Division	Apps	Goals	Apps	Goals	Apps	Goals	Apps	Goals	Apps	Goals
Jong PSV	2024–25	Eerste Divisie	14	0	—		—		—		14	0
PSV	2024–25	Eredivisie	0	0	1	0	0	0	0	0	1	0
Club NXT	2025–26	Challenger Pro League	10	0	—		—		—		10	0
Club Brugge KV	2025–26	Belgian Pro League	0	0	1	0	0	0	—		1	0
Career total			24	0	2	0	0	0	0	0	26	0
