= Mathis Jangéal =

French footballer (born 2008)

Personal information
- Date of birth: 24 June 2008 (age 18)
- Place of birth: Longjumeau, France
- Position: Attacking midfielder

Team information
- Current team: Famalicão

Youth career
- 2013–2014: Stade Lamentinois
- 2015–2019: Emulation
- 2019–2021: Case-Pilote
- 2021–2026: Paris Saint-Germain

Senior career*
Years	Team	Apps	(Gls)
2025–2026	Paris Saint-Germain	1	(0)
2026–	Famalicão	0	(0)

International career^{‡}
2023–2024	France U16	3	(0)
- * Club domestic league appearances and goals as of 316:29, 12 September 2025 (UTC) ‡ National team caps and goals as of 16:29, 12 September 2025 (UTC)

Mathis Jangéal (or Jangeal; born 24 June 2008) is a French professional footballer who plays as an attacking midfielder for Primeira Liga club Famalicão.

== Early life ==
Born in Longjumeau, France, Jangéal moved to Guadeloupe with his family at 6 months old where he played with Stade Lamentinois from the age of 5. In 2015, he moved to Martinique and played there for Emulation and Case-Pilote.

== Club career ==
On 21 July 2021, Jangéal joined the pre-youth academy (French: centre de préformation) of Paris Saint-Germain (PSG), becoming the first player to move from the PSG youth academies in the Antilles and French Guiana to the club's pre-academy in metropolitan France. On 13 May 2022, he extended his contract with Paris Saint-Germain for three seasons. He made his senior and professional debut with Paris Saint-Germain as a substitute in a 2–0 Ligue 1 win over Auxerre on 27 September 2025.

On 22 May 2026, Jangéal scored a brace in the Coupe Gambardella final, including a stoppage-time penalty, helping PSG to a 3–2 victory over Montpellier for their first title in 35 years. On 13 June, he scored a brace in the Championnat National U19 final, with PSG winning 2–1 over Clermont to take home a third successive league title.

On 27 June 2026, Jangéal signed a five-year contract with Primeira Liga club Famalicão, leaving Paris Saint-Germain on a free transfer.

== International career ==
Born in metropolitan France, Jangéal is of Martiniquais and Guadeloupean descent. He debuted with the France U16s for friendlies in 2023 and 2024. In February 2025, he was called up to the France U17s for a set of 2025 UEFA European Under-17 Championship qualification matches.

== Career statistics ==
As of match played 20 December 2025

Appearances and goals by club, season and competition
Club	Season	League			Coupe de France		Europe		Other		Total	
Club	Season	Division	Apps	Goals	Apps	Goals	Apps	Goals	Apps	Goals	Apps	Goals
Paris Saint-Germain	2025–26	Ligue 1	1	0	1	0	0	0	0	0	2	0
Career total			1	0	1	0	0	0	0	0	2	0

== Honours ==
Paris Saint-Germain U19

- Championnat National U19: 2023–24, 2024–25, 2025–26

Paris Saint-Germain U18

- Coupe Gambardella: 2025–26

Paris Saint-Germain

- Ligue 1: 2025–26
