= Tiago Freitas =

Portuguese footballer

Personal information
- Full name: Tiago Dias Freitas
- Date of birth: 17 August 2006 (age 20)
- Place of birth: Castro Daire, Portugal
- Height: 1.86 m (6 ft 1 in)
- Position: Midfielder

Team information
- Current team: Benfica B
- Number: 88

Youth career
- 2011–2015: O Castro
- 2015–2018: CB Viseu
- 2018–2025: Benfica

Senior career*
Years	Team	Apps	(Gls)
2025–	Benfica B	23	(3)
2025–	Benfica	0	(0)

International career^{‡}
2021–2022	Portugal U16	4	(0)
2022–2023	Portugal U17	9	(1)
2023–2024	Portugal U18	15	(3)
2024–	Portugal U19	8	(0)
- * Club domestic league appearances and goals as of 10 June 2026 ‡ National team caps and goals as of 13:44, 8 November 2025 (UTC)

Tiago Dias Freitas (born 17 August 2006) is a Portuguese professional footballer who plays as a midfielder for Benfica B.

== Club career ==
Freitas is a product of the youth academies of the Portuguese clubs O Castro, CB Viseu, and Benfica. On 23 November 2020, he signed a trainee contract with Benfica. On 4 November 2022, he signed his first professional contract with Benfica. On 3 April 2025, he extended his contract with Benfica until 2029 and was promoted to their reserves. He debuted with the senior Benfica side as a substitute in a 2–0 UEFA Champions League win over Napoli on 10 December 2025.

== International career ==
Freitas is a youth international for Portugal. He was called up to the Portugal U19s for a set of friendlies.
