= AZ Youth Academy =

AZ Academy
- Full name: Alkmaar Zaanstreek Youth Academy
- Ground: AFAS Training Complex, Netherlands
- Capacity: 2,000
- Head coach: (Netherlands) Paul Brandenburg
- Website: www.az.nl/jeugdopleiding
Home colours	Away colours

The AZ Youth Academy (Dutch: AZ Jeugdopleiding) is a football youth academy of Dutch club AZ Alkmaar. The academy is located and trains at the AFAS Training Complex, also known as Kalverhoek Stadium in Wijdewormer, Netherlands.

The Youth Academy of AZ is divided into 9 squads: Jong AZ (compete in Eerste Divisie), under-19, under-17, under-16, under-15, under-13, under-12, and under-11.

== History ==
In 2008, AZ and SC Telstar make partnership, which means two academies of two clubs merged into one. AZ also loaned several players to Telstar. But after 3 years, AZ believed the partnership between the two clubs hasn't turned out as a good result and decided to terminate the contract on 1 July 2011.

After the bankruptcy of AZ's sponsor DSB Bank in 2009, the club's survival was threatened, so the board has decided cut back everywhere to invest in the youth academy fully.

In 2010, AZ Youth Academy achieved the highest number of points ever in the Netherlands at the KNVB Certification, with 5,744 points.

In the early 2014, AZ planned to move their youth training centre to Kalverhoek Stadium in Zaanstad; however, that led to a lawsuit between the municipality of Alkmaar and the club, it ended with AZ won the case and finished stadium in 2016. During 2015 to 2016, AZ won two successive Rinus Michels Award for the best youth academy in the Netherlands.

== Under-19 ==
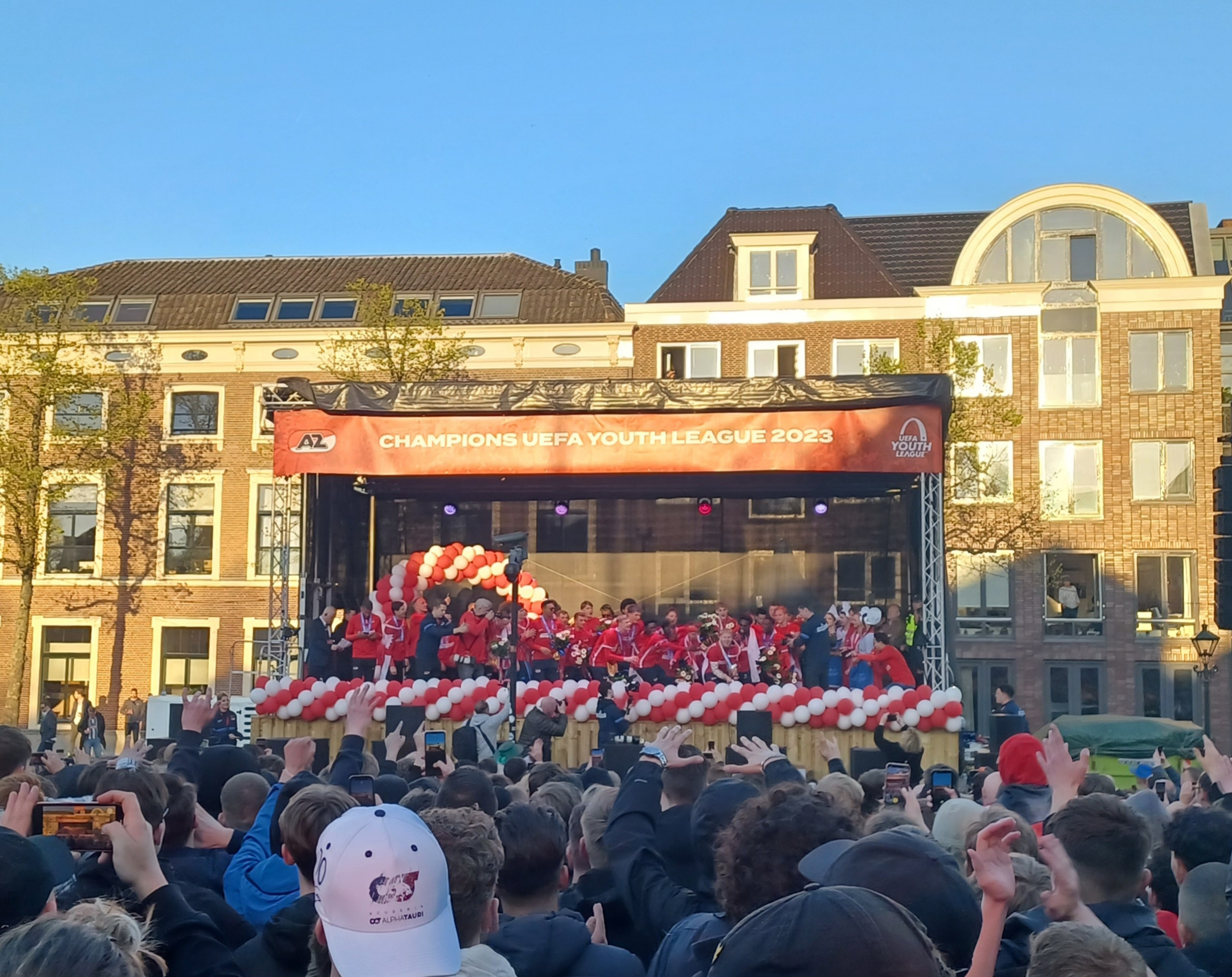
AZ Alkmaar under-19 in the ceremony after winning the UEFA Youth League in 2023.

AZ under-19 (Dutch: AZ onder-19) competes in the A-Junioren Eredivisie, the highest junior football division in the Netherlands.

In the 2021–22 season, AZ under-19 made their first appearance in the UEFA Youth League, as the team placed first in the league before it was cancelled due to the Coronavirus pandemic. They advanced to the round of 16 and lost to Juventus FC on penalties. In the 2022–23 season, AZ became the first Dutch club ever to go to the final and win the UEFA Youth League, after defeating Hajduk Split 5-0 at the Stade de Geneve on 24 April 2023. They also continued to compete in the 2023 Under-20 Intercontinental Cup and were only defeated by Boca Juniors 4–1 on penalty in the final.

== Honours ==
=== Under-19 ===
Domestic

- A-Junioren Eredivisie: 2024-25 (Autumn)

International

- Eurovoetbal: 2006
- Copa Amsterdam: 2009
- UEFA Youth League: 2022-23
- Under-20 Intercontinental Cup runners-up: 2023

=== Under-17 ===
Domestic

- B-Junioren Eredivisie: 2023

== List of international players ==
This is a list of players who played for one of the AZ Youth Academy's teams and later became internationals for their respective countries:

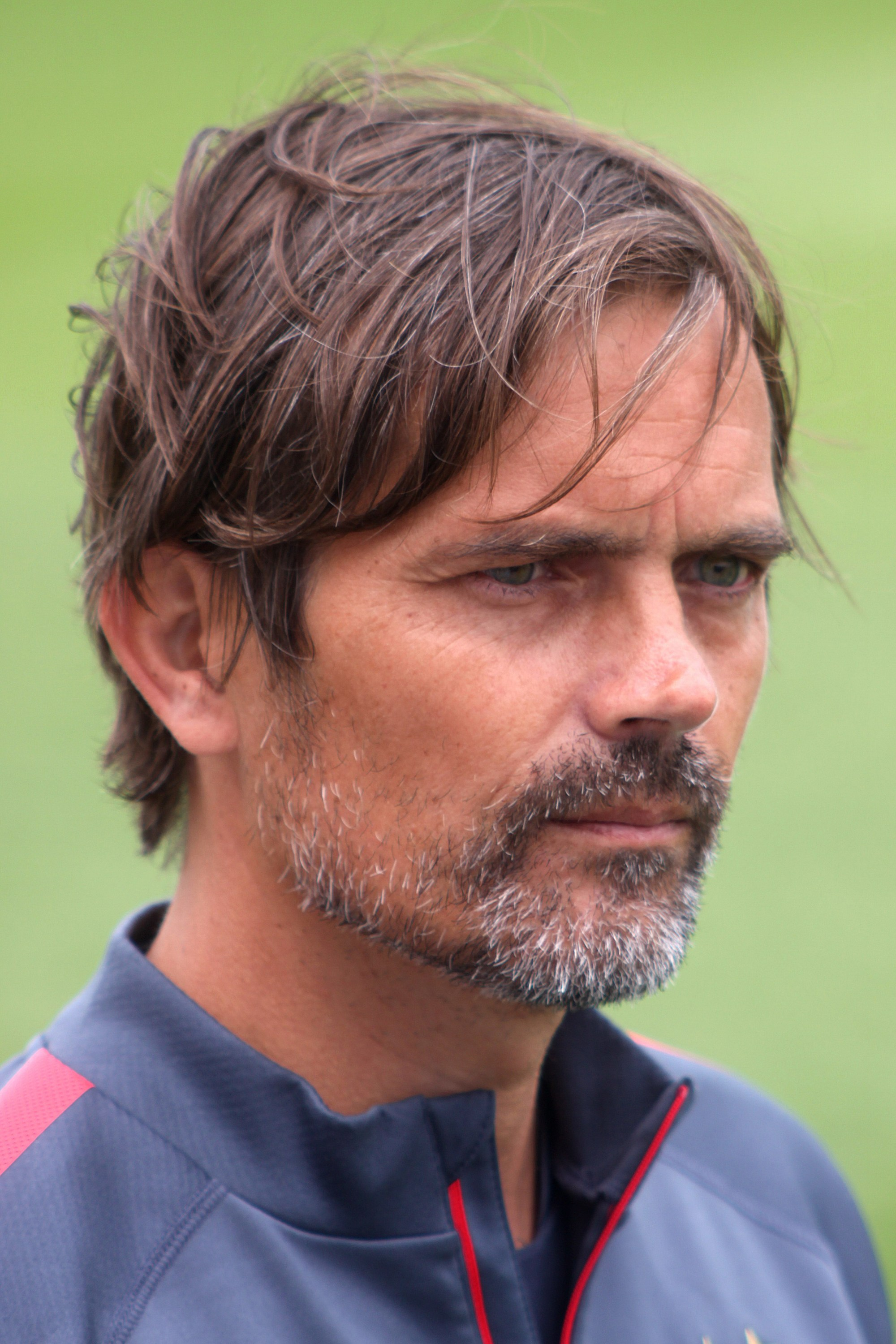
Phillip Cocu, who has 101 appearances for the Netherlands national team.

- (Netherlands) Phillip Cocu (1996–2006)
- (Netherlands) Khalid Boulahrouz (2004–2012)
- (Netherlands) Ron Vlaar (2005–2014)
- (Iceland) Aron Gunnarsson (2008–present)
- (Bosnia and Herzegovina) Haris Međunjanin (2009–2018)
- (Iceland) Kolbeinn Sigþórsson (2010–2021)
- (Netherlands) Jeremain Lens (2010–2017)
- (Morocco) Oussama Assaidi (2011–2015)
- (Curaçao) Christy Bonevacia (2011)
- (Finland) Toni Kolehmainen (2012–2015)
- (Cameroon) Willie Overtoom (2012–2013)
- (Netherlands) Luciano Narsingh (2012–2016)
- (Netherlands) Adam Maher (2012–2013)
- (Netherlands) Oğuzhan Özyakup (2013–2019)
- (Finland) Thomas Lam (2015–present)
- (Norway) Fredrik Midtsjø (2016–2022)
- (Netherlands) Wesley Hoedt (2017)
- (Netherlands) Calvin Stengs (2019–present)
- (Netherlands) Owen Wijndal (2020–2021)
- (Japan) Yukinari Sugawara (2020–present)
- (Morocco) Zakaria Aboukhlal (2020–present)
- (Indonesia) Thom Haye (2024–present)
- (Suriname) Immanuel Pherai (2024–present)
