= Tian Nai Koren =

Slovenian footballer (born 2009)

Personal information
- Date of birth: 31 July 2009 (age 17)
- Place of birth: Slovenj Gradec, Slovenia
- Position: Midfielder

Team information
- Current team: Club Brugge
- Number: 85

Youth career
- 2016–2022: Dravograd
- 2022–2025: Maribor
- 2022: → Roho (loan)
- 2025–2026: Club Brugge

Senior career*
Years	Team	Apps	(Gls)
2025–	Club NXT	25	(1)
2026–	Club Brugge	5	(0)

International career^{‡}
2023–2024	Slovenia U15	9	(3)
2023–2025	Slovenia U16	7	(3)
2024–2025	Slovenia U17	14	(10)
2026–	Slovenia U19	5	(0)
2026–	Slovenia U21	2	(0)
2026–	Slovenia	1	(0)
- * Club domestic league appearances and goals as of 8 November 2026 ‡ National team caps and goals as of 14 November 2026

Tian Nai Koren (born 31 July 2009) is a Slovenian professional footballer who plays as a midfielder for Belgian Pro League club Club Brugge and the Slovenia national team.

== Early life ==
Koren was born on 31 July 2009 in Slovenj Gradec, Slovenia. The younger brother of Slovenian footballer Nal Lan Koren, he is the son of former Slovenia national team captain Robert Koren.

== Club career ==
Koren started his football career in 2016 at the age of 7 with Dravograd. In 2022, he joined the youth academy of Slovenian champions Maribor. Following his stint there, Koren joined the youth academy of Belgian side Club Brugge in 2025 and was promoted to the club's reserve team ahead of the 2025–26 season.

== International career ==
Koren is a Slovenia youth international, and represented the country at the under-15, under-16, under-17, under-19, and under-21 level. In October 2024, he played for the under-17 team in the 2025 UEFA European Under-17 Championship qualification.

In June 2026, Koren was called up to the senior team for the first time. On 4 June, he made his debut in a 1–1 draw against Cyprus, and thus became the youngest ever player to represent Slovenia at the age of 16 years and 308 days, surpassing the previous record holder Benjamin Šeško for over a year.

== Career statistics ==
=== Club ===
As of match played 8 November 2026

Appearances and goals by club, season and competition
Club	Season	League			National cup (Note: Includes Belgian Cup)		Continental		Other		Total	
Club	Season	Division	Apps	Goals	Apps	Goals	Apps	Goals	Apps	Goals	Apps	Goals
Club NXT	2025–26	Challenger Pro League	22	1	—		—		—		22	1
Club NXT	2026–27	Challenger Pro League	3	0	—		—		—		3	0
Club NXT	Total		25	1	—		—		—		25	1
Club Brugge	2026–27	Belgian Pro League	5	0	1	0	0	0	1 (Note: Appearance in Belgian Super Cup)	0	7	0
Career total			30	1	1	0	0	0	1	0	32	1

=== International ===
As of match played 4 June 2026

Appearances and goals by national team and year
National team	Year	Apps	Goals
Slovenia	2026	1	0
Total		1	0
