= Yanis Musuayi =

Belgian footballer (born 2007)

Personal information
- Full name: Yanis Kasonga Musuayi
- Date of birth: 26 June 2007 (age 19)
- Place of birth: Belgium
- Height: 1.90 m (6 ft 3 in)
- Position: Forward

Team information
- Current team: Levante

Youth career
- Toekomst Relegem
- 2015–2016: KSKL Ternat
- 2017: Tubize
- 2017–2018: Dender
- 2018–2019: Gent
- 2019–2020: Lokeren
- 2020–2024: Deinze

Senior career*
| Years | Team | Apps | (Gls) |
| 2024 | Deinze | 5 | (0) |
| 2025–2026 | Club NXT | 39 | (7) |
| 2026– | Levante | 0 | (0) |

International career
| 2024 | Belgium U18 | 6 | (1) |
| 2025– | Belgium U19 | 10 | (3) |
- * Club domestic league appearances and goals as of 9 June 2026

Yanis Kasonga Musuayi (born 26 June 2007) is a Belgian footballer who plays as a forward for La Liga club Levante.

== Early life ==
Musuayi began his career FC Toekomst Relegem, and later went on to play for KSKL Ternat after his parents moved to Denderleeuw. He joined Tubize in January 2017, but left for Dender shortly after to play in a club closer from his home as his father was sick.

== Club career ==
=== Early career ===
Musuayi signed for Gent in 2018, but was released one year later, aged 12. He then joined Lokeren, but only spent one season at the club before it went bankrupt, and subsequently moved to Deinze in 2020. He made his first team debut with Deinze on 16 August 2024, coming on as a second-half substitute for Lennart Mertens in a 4–1 Challenger Pro League away win over RSCA Futures.

=== Club Brugge ===
On 7 December 2024, after three further appearances for Deinze, Musuayi agreed to a two-and-a-half-year contract with Club Brugge, being assigned to reserve team Club NXT.

Musuayi scored his first senior goal on 25 October 2025, netting the equalizer in a 1–1 home draw against Olympic Charleroi. The following 20 February, he scored a brace in a 3–2 loss at RFC Liège, and finished the season with seven goals with NXT, being the club's top scorer.

=== Levante ===
On 2 August 2026, La Liga club Levante announced the signing of Musuayi on a four-year deal, for a rumoured fee of € 2.5 million.

== International career ==
Musuayi represented Belgium at under-18 and under-19 levels.
