= Jacobo Ortega =

Spanish footballer (born 2006)

Personal information
- Full name: Jacobo Ortega Conde
- Date of birth: 29 May 2006 (age 20)
- Place of birth: Madrid, Spain
- Height: 1.90 m (6 ft 3 in)
- Position: Forward

Team information
- Current team: Strasbourg
- Number: 30

Youth career
- Real Madrid

Senior career*
Years	Team	Apps	(Gls)
2024–2026	Real Madrid C	59	(14)
2024–2026	Real Madrid B	14	(6)
2026–	Strasbourg	7	(1)
- * Club domestic league appearances and goals as of 17 October 2026

Jacobo Ortega Conde (born 29 May 2006) is a Spanish professional footballer who plays as a forward for Ligue 1 club Strasbourg.

== Early life ==
Ortega was born on 29 May 2006 in Madrid, Spain and is a native of the city. Growing up, he enjoyed watching American television show Prison Break and studied business administration.

== Career ==
As a youth player, Ortega joined the youth academy of La Liga side Real Madrid, where he played in the UEFA Youth League, and was promoted to the club's C team ahead of the 2024–25 season. The same year, he was promoted to their reserve team.

On 17 August 2026, Ortega signed a five-year contract with Ligue 1 club Strasbourg.

== Style of play ==
Ortega plays as a forward. Spanish news website Relevo wrote in 2025 that he "is a striker profile that is scarce in Spanish youth teams. A powerful, tall, and goal-scoring striker of the past, he also possesses the talents of today's forwards: he's active outside the box, is physical, and has the quality to make a difference with passes and assists".

== Career statistics ==
As of match played 17 October 2026

Appearances and goals by club, season and competition
Club	Season	League			National cup		Other		Total	
Club	Season	Division	Apps	Goals	Apps	Goals	Apps	Goals	Apps	Goals
Real Madrid C	2024–25	Segunda Federación	32	6	—		2 (Note: Appearances in 2025 Segunda Federación play-offs)	1	34	7
Real Madrid C	2025–26	Segunda Federación	27	8	—		2 (Note: Appearances in 2026 Segunda Federación play-offs)	0	29	8
Real Madrid C	Total		59	14	—		4	1	63	15
Real Madrid B	2025–26	Primera Federación	14	6	—		3 (Note: Two appearances in 2026 Primera Federación play-offs, one appearance in Premier League Cup)	0	17	6
Strasbourg	2026–27	Ligue 1	7	1	0	0	—		7	1
Career total			80	21	0	0	7	1	87	22
