= Daniel Yáñez =

Spanish footballer (born 2007)

Personal information
- Full name: Daniel Yáñez Barla
- Date of birth: 28 March 2007 (age 19)
- Place of birth: Cádiz, Spain
- Height: 1.77 m (5 ft 10 in)
- Position: Winger

Team information
- Current team: Real Madrid B
- Number: 7

Youth career
- 2014–2016: Sporting Playa
- 2016–2017: Cádiz
- 2017–2018: Domingo Sabio
- 2018–2019: Cádiz
- 2019–2024: Real Madrid

Senior career*
Years	Team	Apps	(Gls)
2024–	Real Madrid B	46	(5)
2024–2025	Real Madrid C	2	(0)
2024–	Real Madrid	4	(0)

International career^{‡}
2021–2022	Spain U15	7	(4)
2022	Spain U16	4	(0)
2023–2024	Spain U17	11	(5)
2024–	Spain U18	3	(0)
2025–	Spain U19	15	(5)
Medal record
Men's football
Representing Spain
UEFA European Under-19 Championship
Winner	2026 Wales
- * Club domestic league appearances and goals as of 30 November 2025 ‡ National team caps and goals as of 06:47, 8 September 2026 (UTC)

Daniel Yáñez Barla (born 28 March 2007) is a Spanish footballer who plays as a winger for Real Madrid Castilla.

== Club career ==
Yáñez is a product of the academies of Sporting Playa, Cádiz and Domingo Sabio, before finishing his development with Real Madrid starting in 2019. In 2023, he signed his first professional contract with Real Madrid. In 2024, he debuted with Real Madrid Castilla, and after a prolific start with the 2024–25 UEFA Youth League, he started training with the senior Real Madrid team in December 2024. He made his professional debut with the senior Real Madrid team as a substitute in a 3–0 La Liga win over Girona on 7 December 2024. On 14 March 2026, he recorded his first assist for Real Madrid, delivering a cross into the box for Dean Huijsen's goal in a 4–1 win over Elche.

== International career ==
Yáñez plays international football for Spain, representing his country at various youth levels starting from the U15 squad. He played for the Spain U17s at the 2023 FIFA U-17 World Cup. Yáñez played for Spain U19 at the 2026 UEFA Euro Under-19 scoring once in a 7–0 win against Wales U19. He also appeared in the final with his team winning 2–0 against Germany U19.

== Career statistics ==
As of match played 14 May 2026

Appearances and goals by club, season and competition
Club	Season	League			Copa del Rey		Europe		Other		Total	
Club	Season	Division	Apps	Goals	Apps	Goals	Apps	Goals	Apps	Goals	Apps	Goals
Real Madrid Castilla	2024–25	Primera Federación	13	1	—		—		—		13	1
Real Madrid Castilla	2025–26	Primera Federación	33	4	—		—		—		33	4
Real Madrid Castilla	Total		46	5	—		—		—		46	5
Real Madrid	2024–25	La Liga	2	0	0	0	0	0	0	0	2	0
Real Madrid	2025–26	La Liga	2	0	0	0	0	0	0	0	2	0
Real Madrid	Total		4	0	0	0	0	0	0	0	4	0
Career total			50	5	0	0	0	0	0	0	50	5

== Honours ==
Spain U19

- UEFA European Under-19 Championship: 2026
