= Stade de la Tuilière =

Stadium

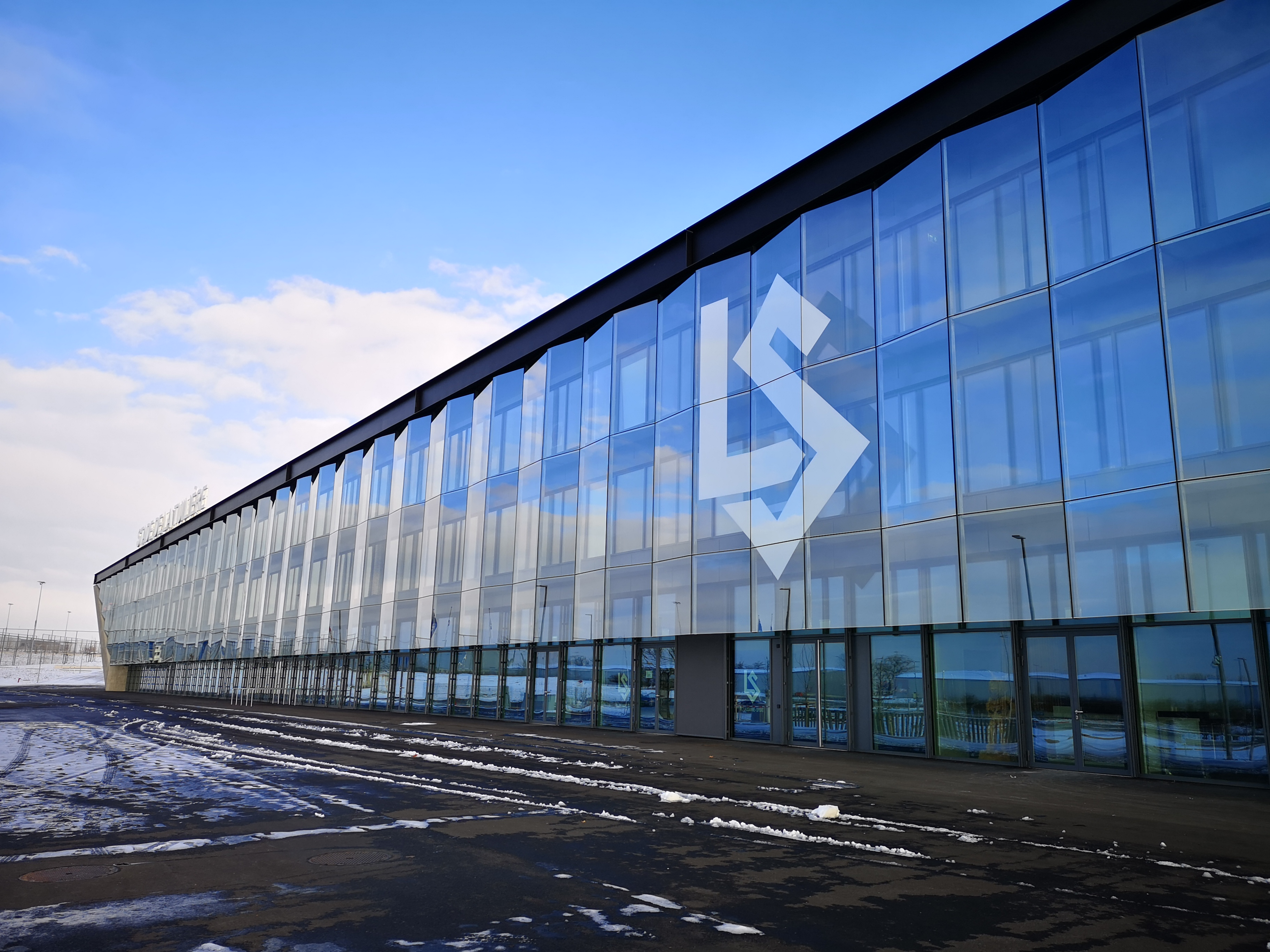
- Interactive map of Stade de la Tuilière
- Location: Lausanne, Switzerland
- Coordinates: 46°32′37″N 6°37′19″E
- Owner: City of Lausanne
- Operator: Lausanne-Sport
- Capacity: 12,544
- Surface: Synthetic grass

Construction
- Built: 2017
- Opened: 29 November 2020
- Renovated: 29 November 2020
- Cost: €70.8m (only stadium ) + €40m (sport center)

Tenant
- Lausanne-Sport

Website
- https://www.stadedelatuiliere.com/

Stade de la Tuilière is a football stadium in Lausanne, Switzerland. It is the current home of the football club FC Lausanne-Sport. The stadium has a capacity of 12,544.

FC Lausanne-Sport planned the construction of the stadium in 2017. Their stadium at the time, Stade Olympique de la Pontaise, was multi-purpose and the club wanted new infrastructure only for football. The stadium was funded by the City of Lausanne. It formally opened on 29 November 2020, as the hosts Lausanne lost 3–0 to BSC Young Boys in a Swiss Super League match.
