= Club NXT =

Belgian football youth academy

- Full name: Club NXT
- Nickname: Club Brugge
- Short name: NXT
- Founded: 1 July 2020; 6 years ago
- Ground: Schiervelde Stadion
- Capacity: 8,340
- Owner: Club Brugge
- CEO: Guillian Preud'homme
- Head coach: Piet Cremers
- League: Challenger Pro League
- 2025–26: Challenger Pro League, 16th of 17
- Website: clubbrugge.be/club-nxt
Home colours	Away colours	Third colours

Club NXT is the youth academy of Belgian football club Club Brugge. The most senior team of Club NXT acts as Club Brugge's reserve team, and competes in the Challenger Pro League, the second flight of Belgian football.

== History ==
On 1 July 2020, Belgian Pro League side Club Brugge announced that they would be rebranding their youth academy to Club NXT. On 13 August 2020, it was announced that the club's reserve team would play in the Challenger Pro League, the second flight of Belgian football, for the 2020–21 season after becoming champions in the Reserve Pro League the year before.

Club NXT played its first match in the second division on 22 August 2020 against RWDM47. On 30 August 2020, Thomas Van den Keybus scored the club's first goal against Lommel in a 2–2 draw. The following season, Club NXT changed grounds. The youth team will be playing their home games in the Schiervelde Stadion in Roeselaere, 25 kilometers from the Jan Breydelstadium. The stadium will be renamed to 'The NEST'.

For the 2022–23 season, it was decided that 4 reserve teams would partake in the Challenger Pro League. Based on the final standings of the Reserve Pro League, this meant that Club NXT would make its return and be joined by Jong Genk, RSCA Futures and SL16 FC.

On 15 June 2022, Brugge named Nicky Hayen as the new coach for Club NXT. This happened 10 days after Guillian Preud'homme was announced as the separate CEO for Club NXT and Club YLA.

== Results ==
Season	League									Division	Points	Remarks
	IA	IB	IAm	IIAm	IIIAm	P.I	P.II	P.III	P.IV			
2020–21		8								First Division B	13	
2021–22	No reserve teams were active outside the Reserve Pro League, where Club NXT finished 3rd.											
2022–23		4								Challenger Pro League	49	
2023–24		9								Challenger Pro League	37	
2024–25		6								Challenger Pro League	47	

== Players ==
=== Current squad ===
As of 3 September 2026

Note: Flags indicate national team as defined under FIFA eligibility rules; some limited exceptions apply. Players may hold more than one non-FIFA nationality.

No.	Pos.	Nation	Player
27	FW	GER	Wisdom Mike
39	FW	BEL	Milan Robberechts
54	DF	FRA	Samba Coulibaly
57	FW	FRA	Elijah Ly
60	DF	ENG	Emmanuel Fejokwu
61	GK	HUN	Stefan Ostoici
68	MF	TUR	Utku Kurtal
70	MF	ESP	Alejandro Granados
71	GK	BEL	Axl De Corte
72	FW	BEL	Jessi Da Silva
73	DF	BEL	Briek Morel
74	DF	BEL	Mateo Haesaert
75	DF	GER	Dahrel Tchitchi
76	MF	BEL	Lucas Delorge
78	FW	BEL	Al-Hassan Kamara
80	MF	MAR	Ilyas Bouazzaoui

No.	Pos.	Nation	Player
81	GK	BEL	Argus Vanden Driessche
82	DF	BEL	Samuel Gomez Van Hoogen
84	FW	BEL	Matteo Soria
86	MF	ITA	Gianluca Okon
87	FW	BEL	Clever Ossohou
89	FW	BEL	Jakke Van Britsom
90	DF	ENG	Andre Garcia
91	GK	BEL	Thibeau Kestemont
92	DF	BEL	Alexander Vandeperre
93	DF	BEL	Wout Verlinden
94	MF	BEL	Emiel Callens
95	DF	BEL	Mohamed Galal Elbay
96	DF	GHA	Denis Odoi
97	MF	BEL	Naïm Amengai
98	DF	BEL	Axl Wins
99	FW	COL	Kevin Angulo (on loan from América de Cali)

=== Out on loan ===
Note: Flags indicate national team as defined under FIFA eligibility rules; some limited exceptions apply. Players may hold more than one non-FIFA nationality.

No. / Pos. / Nation / Player; — / DF / BEL / Sacha Marloye (at RWDM Brussels until 30 June 2027)	No. / Pos. / Nation / Player; — / MF / DEN / Tobias Lund Jensen (at SV Ried until 30 June 2027)

== See also ==
- Club Brugge KV
