= 2027 UEFA European Under-19 Championship qualification =

Tournament details
- Dates: Round 1: 25 March – 9 June 2026; Round 2: 11 – 17 November 2026; Round 3: Spring 2027
- Teams: 54 (from 1 confederation)

Tournament statistics
- Matches played: 156
- Goals scored: 554 (3.55 per match)
- Top scorer(s): (Albania) Gabriel Kulla (8 goals)
- All statistics correct as of 17 November 2026.

The 2027 UEFA European Under-19 Championship qualification is an under-19 men's national football team competition that will determine the seven teams joining the automatically qualified hosts Czech Republic in the 2027 UEFA European Under-19 Championship final tournament.

For the first time, the UEFA European Under-19 Championship will begin under a new format, consisting of 3 rounds instead of 2. Round 1 will be played in spring 2026, round 2 in autumn 2026, and round 3 in spring 2027, setting the pattern to be followed in future seasons.

Russia were excluded from the tournament due to the ongoing invasion of Ukraine. Therefore, including the host Czech Republic, 54 teams entered this qualification competition, which consists of Round 1, played in March–June 2026, followed by Round 2 in autumn 2026, and Round 3 in spring 2027.

== Format ==
This is the first year for the U-19 qualification to have a new format, similar to the U-17 qualification and Women's U-17 and U-19 qualifying competitions. The qualification consists of three rounds. Each round comprises several groups, split into league A and league B, which are played as single-round-robin mini-tournaments, with one team from each group selected as the host after the draw, except in round 3. Czech Republic qualified for final tournament regardless of qualification results

- Round 1: All 54 teams, including hosts Czech Republic, will be split into League A (28 nations) and League B (remaining entrants), the league determined by round 2 of qualifying for the relevant U17 EURO (for 2026/27 U19 EURO, the league will be set by round 2 of 2024/25 U17 EURO). The teams in League A will be split into seven groups of four. The fourth-ranked teams will be relegated to League B for round 2. The teams in League B will be split into seven groups of four or three, depending on the number of participants. The group winners will be promoted to League A for round 2.
- Round 2: The teams in League A will be split into seven groups of four. The fourth-ranked teams will be eliminated. The teams in League B will be split into seven groups of four or three, depending on the number of participants. The group winners will be promoted to League A for round 3, with the remaining teams eliminated.
- Round 3: The format will resemble the current elite round, with 28 teams drawn into seven groups of four. The seven group winners will qualify for the final tournament, joining the hosts.

=== Tiebreakers ===
In a group, teams are ranked according to points (3 points for a win, 1 point for a draw, 0 points for a loss), and if tied on points, the following tiebreaking criteria are applied, in the order given, to determine the rankings (Regulations Articles 14.01 and 14.02):

1. Points in head-to-head matches among tied teams
2. Goal difference in head-to-head matches among tied teams
3. Goals scored in head-to-head matches among tied teams
4. If more than two teams are tied, and after applying all head-to-head criteria above, a subset of teams is still tied, all head-to-head criteria above are reapplied exclusively to this subset of teams
5. Goal difference in all group matches
6. Goals scored in all group matches
7. Penalty shoot-out if only two teams have the same number of points, and they met in the last round of the group and are tied after applying all criteria above (not used if more than two teams have the same number of points, or if their rankings are not relevant for qualification for the next stage)
8. Disciplinary points (red card = 3 points, yellow card = 1 point, expulsion for 2 yellow cards in one match = 3 points)
9. UEFA coefficient ranking for the Qualifying round draw

To determine the best third-placed team from the Qualifying round, the results against the teams in fourth place are discarded. The following criteria are applied (Regulations Articles 15.01 and 15.02):

1. Points
2. Goal difference
3. Goals scored
4. Disciplinary points
5. UEFA coefficient ranking for the Qualifying round draw

== Round 1 ==
=== Draw ===
The draw for the Qualifying round was held on 10 December 2025, at the UEFA headquarters in Nyon, Switzerland.

The results of round 2 of the 2024/25 Under-17 championship, including promotions and relegations, determined the access list for round 1 of the 2026/27 Under-19 championship.:

=== League A ===
Times are CET/CEST, (Note: CET (UTC+1) for dates up to 26 March 2023, and CEST (UTC+2) for dates thereafter.) as listed by UEFA (local times, if different, are in parentheses).

==== Group A1 ====
| Pos | Team | Pld | W | D | L | GF | GA | GD | Pts | Transfer or relegation |
|---|---|---|---|---|---|---|---|---|---|---|
| 1 | Belgium (H) | 3 | 2 | 1 | 0 | 10 | 3 | +7 | 7 | Transferred to Round 2 League A |
| 2 | Sweden | 3 | 2 | 1 | 0 | 11 | 5 | +6 | 7 | Transferred to Round 2 League A |
| 3 | Slovenia | 3 | 1 | 0 | 2 | 2 | 8 | −6 | 3 | Transferred to Round 2 League A |
| 4 | Cyprus | 3 | 0 | 0 | 3 | 1 | 8 | −7 | 0 | Relegated to Round 2 League B |

Source: UEFA
Rules for classification: Qualification tiebreakers
(H) Hosts
25 March 2026
12:00

| Sweden | 5–1 | Slovenia |
|---|---|---|
| Brantlind 36', 40', 61'; Saeed 66'; Sultan 73' | Report | Kozar 64' |

National Training Centre Tubize, Tubize
Attendance: 80
Referee: Kamal Umudlu (Azerbaijan)
25 March 2026
19:00

| Belgium | 4–0 | Cyprus |
|---|---|---|
| Camara 30'; Gielen 41'; De Kimpe 55'; van de Ven 70' | Report |

National Training Centre Tubize, Tubize
Attendance: 315
Referee: Mohammad Usman Aslam (Norway)

28 March 2026
12:00

| Slovenia | 1–0 | Cyprus |
|---|---|---|
| Kovačič 38' | Report |

National Training Centre Tubize, Tubize
Attendance: 52
Referee: Kevin O'Sullivan (Ireland)
28 March 2026
19:00

| Belgium | 3–3 | Sweden |
|---|---|---|
| Murenzi 13', 26' (pen.); Mitongo 70' | Report | Filling 3'; Brönner 29', 45' |

National Training Centre Tubize, Tubize
Attendance: 400
Referee: Kamal Umudlu (Azerbaijan)

31 March 2026
15:00

| Slovenia | 0–3 | Belgium |
|---|---|---|
| | Report | Van De Ven 32'; Kapers 45'; Murenzi 90+3' |

National Training Centre Tubize, Tubize
Attendance: 165
Referee: Mohammad Usman Aslam (Norway)
31 March 2026
15:00

| Cyprus | 1–3 | Sweden |
|---|---|---|
| Ilia 24' | Report | Sadarangani 21'; Brantlind 68'; Saeed 87' |

Edmond Machtens Stadium, Brussels
Attendance: 40
Referee: Kevin O'Sullivan (Ireland)

==== Group A2 ====
| Pos | Team | Pld | W | D | L | GF | GA | GD | Pts | Transfer or relegation |
|---|---|---|---|---|---|---|---|---|---|---|
| 1 | Italy | 3 | 2 | 1 | 0 | 6 | 2 | +4 | 7 | Transferred to Round 2 League A |
| 2 | Scotland (H) | 3 | 1 | 1 | 1 | 6 | 6 | 0 | 4 | Transferred to Round 2 League A |
| 3 | Republic of Ireland | 3 | 0 | 2 | 1 | 5 | 6 | −1 | 2 | Transferred to Round 2 League A |
| 4 | Poland | 3 | 0 | 2 | 1 | 2 | 5 | −3 | 2 | Relegated to Round 2 League B |

Source: UEFA
Rules for classification: Qualification tiebreakers
(H) Hosts
25 March 2026
12:00

| Poland | 1–1 | Republic of Ireland |
|---|---|---|
| Przybyłko 65' | Report | Finneran 13' |

Kirkintilloch Community Sports Complex, Glasgow
Attendance: 110
Referee: Rareș Vidican (Romania)
25 March 2026
15:00

| Italy | 3–0 | Scotland |
|---|---|---|
| Iddrisa 45+3'; Campaniello 52'; Arena 72' | Report |

Excelsior Stadium, Airdrie
Attendance: 271
Referee: Sven Wolfensberger (Switzerland)

28 March 2026
12:00

| Italy | 1–1 | Poland |
|---|---|---|
| Campaniello 16' | Report | Mozie 67' |

Kirkintilloch Community Sports Complex, Glasgow
Attendance: 83
Referee: Rares Vidican (Romania)
28 March 2026
16:30

| Republic of Ireland | 3–3 | Scotland |
|---|---|---|
| McDonagh 39'; McMahon-Brown 50'; Tollett 69' | Report | McCallion 30'; North 54'; Teasdale 81' |

Kirkintilloch Community Sports Complex, Glasgow
Attendance: 352
Referee: Karel Rouček (Czechia)

31 March 2026
20:00

| Republic of Ireland | 1–2 | Italy |
|---|---|---|
| McMahon-Brown 56' | Report | Arena 3', 46' |

Kirkintilloch Community Sports Complex, Glasgow
Attendance: 130
Referee: Karel Rouček (Czechia)
31 March 2026
20:00

| Scotland | 3–0 | Poland |
|---|---|---|
| McGrath 1'; Smith 35'; McCallion 80' | Report |

Excelsior Stadium, Airdrie
Attendance: 185
Referee: Sven Wolfensberger (Switzerland)

==== Group A3 ====
| Pos | Team | Pld | W | D | L | GF | GA | GD | Pts | Transfer or relegation |
|---|---|---|---|---|---|---|---|---|---|---|
| 1 | Czech Republic | 3 | 2 | 1 | 0 | 6 | 2 | +4 | 7 | Transferred to Round 2 League A |
| 2 | Finland (H) | 3 | 2 | 1 | 0 | 5 | 3 | +2 | 7 | Transferred to Round 2 League A |
| 3 | Ukraine | 3 | 1 | 0 | 2 | 6 | 5 | +1 | 3 | Transferred to Round 2 League A |
| 4 | Estonia | 3 | 0 | 0 | 3 | 1 | 8 | −7 | 0 | Relegated to Round 2 League B |

Source: UEFA
Rules for classification: Qualification tiebreakers
(H) Hosts

FTH - Final tournament hosts

25 March 2026
12:00

| Czech Republic | 2–0 | Estonia |
|---|---|---|
| Hruška 46'; Škrkoň 57' | Report |

Mustapekka Areena, Helsinki
Attendance: 75
Referee: Antoine Chiaramonti (Andorra)
25 March 2026
17:00

| Ukraine | 1–2 | Finland |
|---|---|---|
| Zudin 74' | Report | Palmula 32'; Katz 60' (pen.) |

Mustapekka Areena, Helsinki
Attendance: 687
Referee: Kristaps Ratnieks (Latvia)

28 March 2026
12:00

| Finland | 2–1 | Estonia |
|---|---|---|
| Katz 81'; Haikala 90+4' | Report | Mägi 33' |

Mustapekka Areena, Helsinki
Attendance: 785
Referee: Antoine Chiaramonti (Andorra)
28 March 2026
17:00

| Czech Republic | 3–1 | Ukraine |
|---|---|---|
| Jadrníček 7'; Janega 69'; Frolík 90+3' | Report | Zudin 35' (pen.) |

Mustapekka Areena, Helsinki
Attendance: 122
Referee: Georgi Ginchev (Bulgaria)

31 March 2026
12:00

| Finland | 1–1 | Czech Republic |
|---|---|---|
| Vainio 31' | Report | Škrkoň 16' |

Mustapekka Areena, Helsinki
Attendance: 449
Referee: Kristaps Ratnieks (Latvia)
31 March 2026
12:00

| Estonia | 0–4 | Ukraine |
|---|---|---|
| | Report | Liusin 19'; Bodnar 28'; Hlyut 43'; Balakai 79' |

Helsinki Olympic Stadium, Helsinki
Attendance: 51
Referee: Georgi Ginchev (Bulgaria)

==== Group A4 ====
| Pos | Team | Pld | W | D | L | GF | GA | GD | Pts | Transfer or relegation |
|---|---|---|---|---|---|---|---|---|---|---|
| 1 | Austria (H) | 3 | 2 | 1 | 0 | 8 | 3 | +5 | 7 | Transferred to Round 2 League A |
| 2 | Israel | 3 | 1 | 1 | 1 | 5 | 4 | +1 | 4 | Transferred to Round 2 League A |
| 3 | Germany | 3 | 1 | 1 | 1 | 5 | 6 | −1 | 4 | Transferred to Round 2 League A |
| 4 | Bosnia and Herzegovina | 3 | 0 | 1 | 2 | 2 | 7 | −5 | 1 | Relegated to Round 2 League B |

Source: UEFA
Rules for classification: Qualification tiebreakers
(H) Hosts
25 March 2026
13:00

| Germany | 2–1 | Bosnia and Herzegovina |
|---|---|---|
| Staff 5'; Gashi 56' | Report | Nišić 37' |

Lindabrunn, Enzesfeld-Lindabrunn
Attendance: 100
Referee: Dominik Starý (Czechia)
25 March 2026
18:00

| Israel | 1–2 | Austria |
|---|---|---|
| Avrevaya 67' | Report | Ekereokosu 11'; Masching 48' |

Stadion Wiener Neustadt, Wiener Neustadt
Attendance: 350
Referee: Dario Bel (Croatia)

28 March 2026
13:00

| Germany | 1–3 | Israel |
|---|---|---|
| Staff 82' (pen.) | Report | Grimberg 15' (pen.); Simon 70' (pen.), 88' (pen.) |

Lindabrunn, Enzesfeld-Lindabrunn
Attendance: 100
Referee: Granit Maqedonci (Sweden)
28 March 2026
18:00

| Austria | 4–0 | Bosnia and Herzegovina |
|---|---|---|
| Krapf 9'; Deshishku 13' (pen.); Wölbl 68'; Delić 88' | Report |

Stadion Wiener Neustadt, Wiener Neustadt
Attendance: 823
Referee: Dominik Starý (Czechia)

31 March 2026
15:00

| Austria | 2–2 | Germany |
|---|---|---|
| Savic 33'; Jozepovic 90' (pen.) | Report | Staff 37' (pen.); Theuer 52' |

Stadion Wiener Neustadt, Wiener Neustadt
Attendance: 900
Referee: Dario Bel (Croatia)
31 March 2026
15:00

| Bosnia and Herzegovina | 1–1 | Israel |
|---|---|---|
| Nišić 11' | Report | Levy 43' |

Lindabrunn, Enzesfeld-Lindabrunn
Attendance: 150
Referee: Granit Maqedonci (Sweden)

==== Group A5 ====
| Pos | Team | Pld | W | D | L | GF | GA | GD | Pts | Transfer or relegation |
|---|---|---|---|---|---|---|---|---|---|---|
| 1 | Spain | 3 | 3 | 0 | 0 | 9 | 1 | +8 | 9 | Transferred to Round 2 League A |
| 2 | England | 3 | 2 | 0 | 1 | 7 | 4 | +3 | 6 | Transferred to Round 2 League A |
| 3 | Croatia (H) | 3 | 1 | 0 | 2 | 1 | 6 | −5 | 3 | Transferred to Round 2 League A |
| 4 | Bulgaria | 3 | 0 | 0 | 3 | 1 | 7 | −6 | 0 | Relegated to Round 2 League B |

Source: UEFA
Rules for classification: Qualification tiebreakers
(H) Hosts
25 March 2026
12:00

| England | 4–1 | Bulgaria |
|---|---|---|
| Heskey 11'; Ezenwata 14', 34'; Hutchinson 90+1' | Report | Stoichkov 64' |

Sportski park NK Graničar, Kotoriba
Attendance: 60
Referee: Stefan Ebner (Austria)
25 March 2026
15:30

| Spain | 4–0 | Croatia |
|---|---|---|
| Llorente 27', 45+1'; Ciria 44'; Fernández 49' | Report |

City Stadium, Križevci
Attendance: 800
Referee: Ross Hardie (Scotland)

28 March 2026
12:00

| England | 1–3 | Spain |
|---|---|---|
| Ezenwata 45' (pen.) | Report | Castillo 9'; Llorente 41'; Ciria 81' |

Sportski park NK Graničar, Kotoriba
Attendance: 100
Referee: Joni Hyytiä (Finland)
28 March 2026
15:30

| Croatia | 1–0 | Bulgaria |
|---|---|---|
| Kumar 83' | Report |

City Stadium, Križevci
Attendance: 400
Referee: Ross Hardie (Scotland)

31 March 2026
14:45

| Croatia | 0–2 | England |
|---|---|---|
| | Report | Matić 30' (o.g.); Benamar 32' |

City Stadium, Križevci
Attendance: 500
Referee: Joni Hyytiä (Finland)
31 March 2026
14:45

| Bulgaria | 0–2 | Spain |
|---|---|---|
| | Report | Bonel 65'; Maciá 90+3' |

Sportski park NK Graničar, Kotoriba
Attendance: 70
Referee: Stefan Ebner (Austria)

==== Group A6 ====
| Pos | Team | Pld | W | D | L | GF | GA | GD | Pts | Transfer or relegation |
|---|---|---|---|---|---|---|---|---|---|---|
| 1 | Portugal | 3 | 1 | 2 | 0 | 2 | 1 | +1 | 5 | Transferred to Round 2 League A |
| 2 | Greece (H) | 3 | 1 | 1 | 1 | 4 | 3 | +1 | 4 | Transferred to Round 2 League A |
| 3 | Kazakhstan | 3 | 1 | 1 | 1 | 6 | 6 | 0 | 4 | Transferred to Round 2 League A |
| 4 | Serbia | 3 | 1 | 0 | 2 | 2 | 4 | −2 | 3 | Relegated to Round 2 League B |

Source: UEFA
Rules for classification: Qualification tiebreakers
(H) Hosts
3 June 2026
11:00

| Portugal | 1−1 | Kazakhstan |
|---|---|---|
| Felicíssimo 81' | Report | Nurgali 86' |

Kaftanzoglio Stadium, Thessaloniki
Attendance: 47
Referee: Mateo Erceg (Croatia)
3 June 2026
17:00

| Greece | 0−1 | Serbia |
|---|---|---|
| | Report | Millwood 90+4' |

Toumba Stadium, Thessaloniki
Attendance: 1,770
Referee: Kamal Umudlu (Azerbaijan)

6 June 2026
11:00

| Serbia | 1−3 | Kazakhstan |
|---|---|---|
| Milovanović 9' | Report | Ismagulov 25'; Bekbolat 47', 51' |

Toumba Stadium, Thessaloniki
Attendance: 70
Referee: Kamal Umudlu (Azerbaijan)
6 June 2026
17:00

| Portugal | 0–0 | Greece |
|---|---|---|
| | Report |

Toumba Stadium, Thessaloniki
Attendance: 1,512
Referee: Romain Lissorgue (France)

9 June 2026
17:00

| Serbia | 0–1 | Portugal |
|---|---|---|
| | Report | Soares 33' |

Kaftanzoglio Stadium, Thessaloniki
Attendance: 56
Referee: Mateo Erceg (Croatia)
9 June 2026
17:00

| Kazakhstan | 2–4 | Greece |
|---|---|---|
| Bekbolat 77'; Smakov 84' | Report | Avramoulis 32'; Berdos 41', 52'; Toursounidis 50' |

Toumba Stadium, Thessaloniki
Attendance: 840
Referee: Romain Lissorgue (France)

==== Group A7 ====
| Pos | Team | Pld | W | D | L | GF | GA | GD | Pts | Transfer or relegation |
|---|---|---|---|---|---|---|---|---|---|---|
| 1 | France | 3 | 2 | 1 | 0 | 4 | 2 | +2 | 7 | Transferred to Round 2 League A |
| 2 | Hungary | 3 | 1 | 1 | 1 | 6 | 3 | +3 | 4 | Transferred to Round 2 League A |
| 3 | Wales | 3 | 1 | 1 | 1 | 2 | 5 | −3 | 4 | Transferred to Round 2 League A |
| 4 | Switzerland (H) | 3 | 0 | 1 | 2 | 5 | 7 | −2 | 1 | Relegated to Round 2 League B |

Source: UEFA
Rules for classification: Qualification tiebreakers
(H) Hosts
25 March 2026
13:30

| Hungary | 2–2 | Switzerland |
|---|---|---|
| Rab 39', 60' | Report | Scherrer 27'; Rab 34' (o.g.) |

Stade de la Fontenette, Carouge
Attendance: 450
Referee: Anton Lashuk (Belarus)
25 March 2026
19:30

| France | 0–0 | Wales |
|---|---|---|
| | Report |

Stade de la Fontenette, Carouge
Attendance: 250
Referee: Sayat Karabayev (Kazakhstan)

28 March 2026
12:00

| France | 1–0 | Hungary |
|---|---|---|
| Rab 44' (o.g.) | Report |

Stade de la Fontenette, Carouge
Attendance: 120
Referee: Marek Radina (Czechia)
28 March 2026
18:00

| Switzerland | 1–2 | Wales |
|---|---|---|
| Stiel 40' | Report | Bradbury 57', 83' |

Stade de la Fontenette, Carouge
Attendance: 510
Referee: Anton Lashuk (Belarus)

31 March 2026
18:30

| Switzerland | 2–3 | France |
|---|---|---|
| Scherrer 77'; Sahin 87' | Report | Valero 16', 65'; Bosey 63' |

Stade de la Fontenette, Carouge
Attendance: 2,702
Referee: Marek Radina (Czechia)
31 March 2026
18:30

| Wales | 0–4 | Hungary |
|---|---|---|
| | Report | Rab 45', 78'; Varga 71'; Nyers 76' |

Stade de Copet, Vevey
Attendance: 60
Referee: Sayat Karabayev (Kazakhstan)

=== League B ===
Times are CET/CEST, as listed by UEFA (local times, if different, are in parentheses).

==== Group B1 ====
| Pos | Team | Pld | W | D | L | GF | GA | GD | Pts | Promotion or transfer |
|---|---|---|---|---|---|---|---|---|---|---|
| 1 | Romania (H) | 3 | 2 | 1 | 0 | 16 | 3 | +13 | 7 | Promotion to Round 2 League A |
| 2 | Denmark | 3 | 2 | 1 | 0 | 9 | 3 | +6 | 7 | Transfer to Round 2 League B |
| 3 | Andorra | 3 | 1 | 0 | 2 | 3 | 4 | −1 | 3 | Transfer to Round 2 League B |
| 4 | Liechtenstein | 3 | 0 | 0 | 3 | 1 | 19 | −18 | 0 | Transfer to Round 2 League B |

Source: UEFA
Rules for classification: Tiebreakers
(H) Hosts
25 March 2026
13:00

| Andorra | 1–3 | Romania |
|---|---|---|
| Anglada 69' | Report | Bota 45+1'; David 63'; Batzula 81' |

Clinceni Stadium, Clinceni
Attendance: 125
Referee: Florian Lata (Albania)
25 March 2026
15:00

| Denmark | 6–1 | Liechtenstein |
|---|---|---|
| Poulsen 25' (pen.); Rutkjær 28'; Lucena 31'; Pimpong 48'; Hvistendahl 72'; Amrani 83' | Report | Beck 90+3' |

Football Centre FRF, Buftea
Attendance: 10
Referee: Giorgi Avazashvili (Georgia)

28 March 2026
13:00

| Romania | 11–0 | Liechtenstein |
|---|---|---|
| Batzula 11'; Cojocariu 13', 69'; Pellegrini 15', 37', 42'; Coman 28'; Banu 32', 34'; David 62'; Amarandei 80' | Report |

Arsenal, Tunari
Attendance: 100
Referee: Giorgi Avazashvili (Georgia)
28 March 2026
15:00

| Denmark | 1–0 | Andorra |
|---|---|---|
| Lucena 31' | Report |

Football Centre FRF, Buftea
Attendance: 35
Referee: Pavle Ilić (Serbia)

31 March 2026
12:00

| Romania | 2–2 | Denmark |
|---|---|---|
| Pellegrini 40'; Roateș 90' | Report | Pimpong 44'; Gheorghe 45+2' (o.g.) |

Clinceni Stadium, Clinceni
Attendance: 217
Referee: Florian Lata (Albania)
31 March 2026
12:00

| Liechtenstein | 0–2 | Andorra |
|---|---|---|
| | Report | González 19', 55' |

Football Centre FRF, Buftea
Attendance: 8
Referee: Pavle Ilić (Serbia)

==== Group B2 ====
| Pos | Team | Pld | W | D | L | GF | GA | GD | Pts | Promotion or transfer |
|---|---|---|---|---|---|---|---|---|---|---|
| 1 | Kosovo | 3 | 2 | 1 | 0 | 11 | 2 | +9 | 7 | Promotion to Round 2 League A |
| 2 | Armenia | 3 | 1 | 2 | 0 | 11 | 2 | +9 | 5 | Transfer to Round 2 League B |
| 3 | Turkey (H) | 3 | 1 | 1 | 1 | 9 | 4 | +5 | 4 | Transfer to Round 2 League B |
| 4 | Gibraltar | 3 | 0 | 0 | 3 | 0 | 23 | −23 | 0 | Transfer to Round 2 League B |

Source: UEFA
Rules for classification: Tiebreakers
(H) Hosts
24 March 2026
11:00

| Armenia | 1–1 | Kosovo |
|---|---|---|
| Batoian 81' (pen.) | Report | Mehmeti 19' |

Arslan Zeki Demirci Sports Complex, Manavgat
Attendance: 41
Referee: Szabolcs Kovacs (Romania)
24 March 2026
14:00

| Turkey | 7–0 | Gibraltar |
|---|---|---|
| Karadeniz 33', 40'; Karademir 53'; Akdoğan 55' (pen.), 80'; Demir 77'; Eligüzel 88' | Report |

Arslan Zeki Demirci Sports Complex, Manavgat
Attendance: 108
Referee: Matteo Marchetti (Italy)

27 March 2026
11:00

| Kosovo | 7–0 | Gibraltar |
|---|---|---|
| R. Ahmeti 20'; D. Ahmeti 23', 81'; Mehmeti 28', 44'; Gashi 63'; Uka 79' | Report |

Arslan Zeki Demirci Sports Complex, Manavgat
Attendance: 38
Referee: Szabolcs Kovacs (Romania)
27 March 2026
14:00

| Turkey | 1–1 | Armenia |
|---|---|---|
| Kahraman 34' | Report | Asiryan 17' |

Arslan Zeki Demirci Sports Complex, Manavgat
Attendance: 138
Referee: Matthew MacDermid (Scotland)

30 March 2026
15:00

| Kosovo | 3–1 | Turkey |
|---|---|---|
| R. Ahmeti 8' (pen.); Mehmeti 20'; Gabrica 89' | Report | Demirbağ 51' |

Arslan Zeki Demirci Sports Complex, Manavgat
Attendance: 201
Referee: Matteo Marchetti (Italy)
30 March 2026
15:00

| Gibraltar | 0–9 | Armenia |
|---|---|---|
| | Report | Davtyan 4'; Asiryan 12'; Batoian 23'; Ambartsumov 34'; Ashikian 45+2', 61'; Hovhannisyan 79'; Gareginyan 83' (pen.); Movsisyan 90' |

Arslan Zeki Demirci Sports Complex, Manavgat
Attendance: 14
Referee: Matthew MacDermid (Scotland)

==== Group B3 ====
| Pos | Team | Pld | W | D | L | GF | GA | GD | Pts | Promotion or transfer |
|---|---|---|---|---|---|---|---|---|---|---|
| 1 | Belarus | 3 | 3 | 0 | 0 | 12 | 0 | +12 | 9 | Promotion to Round 2 League A |
| 2 | Slovakia | 3 | 1 | 1 | 1 | 5 | 6 | −1 | 4 | Transfer to Round 2 League B |
| 3 | Latvia | 3 | 0 | 2 | 1 | 1 | 4 | −3 | 2 | Transfer to Round 2 League B |
| 4 | San Marino (H) | 3 | 0 | 1 | 2 | 2 | 10 | −8 | 1 | Transfer to Round 2 League B |

Source: UEFA
Rules for classification: Tiebreakers
(H) Hosts
15 May 2026
11:00

| Slovakia | 4–2 | San Marino |
|---|---|---|
| Rajnoha 11', 55', 90+3'; Baláž 64' | Report | Arlotti 42'; Raschi 88' |

Stadio Ezio Conti di Dogana, Dogana
Attendance: 180
Referee: Ilioski Vlatko (North Macedonia)
15 May 2026
11:00

| Latvia | 0–3 | Belarus |
|---|---|---|
| | Report |

Acquaviva Stadium, Acquaviva
Referee: Tom Owen (Wales)

18 May 2026
11:00

| Slovakia | 1–1 | Latvia |
|---|---|---|
| Fehér 28' | Report | Beķeris 45+1' |

Acquaviva Stadium, Acquaviva
Attendance: 37
Referee: Menelaos Antoniou (Cyprus)
18 May 2026
11:00

| Belarus | 6–0 | San Marino |
|---|---|---|
| Priemko 3', 23'; Drachou 9', 13'; Lutskovich 19'; Zhyvushka 32' | Report |

Stadio Ezio Conti di Dogana, Dogana
Attendance: 110
Referee: Tom Owen (Wales)

21 May 2026
11:00

| Belarus | 3–0 | Slovakia |
|---|---|---|
| Lutskovich 3', 23', 60' (pen.) | Report |

Acquaviva Stadium, Acquaviva
Attendance: 29
Referee: Ilioski Vlatko (North Macedonia)
21 May 2026
11:00

| San Marino | 0–0 | Latvia |
|---|---|---|
| | Report |

Stadio Ezio Conti di Dogana, Dogana
Attendance: 130
Referee: Menelaos Antoniou (Cyprus)

==== Group B4 ====
| Pos | Team | Pld | W | D | L | GF | GA | GD | Pts | Promotion or transfer |
|---|---|---|---|---|---|---|---|---|---|---|
| 1 | Norway | 3 | 2 | 1 | 0 | 6 | 2 | +4 | 7 | Promotion to Round 2 League A |
| 2 | Luxembourg | 3 | 2 | 0 | 1 | 6 | 4 | +2 | 6 | Transfer to Round 2 League B |
| 3 | Albania (H) | 3 | 1 | 1 | 1 | 10 | 5 | +5 | 4 | Transfer to Round 2 League B |
| 4 | Malta | 3 | 0 | 0 | 3 | 1 | 12 | −11 | 0 | Transfer to Round 2 League B |

Source: UEFA
Rules for classification: Tiebreakers
(H) Hosts
25 March 2026
12:00

| Norway | 1–0 | Malta |
|---|---|---|
| Oppedal 45+2' | Report |

Niko Dovana Stadium, Durrës
Attendance: 63
Referee: Michele Beltrano (San Marino)
25 March 2026
15:00

| Luxembourg | 2–1 | Albania |
|---|---|---|
| Kadamani 29'; Paciencia 36' | Report | Durmishi 45' |

House of Football Natural Pitch, Tirana
Attendance: 431
Referee: Wojciech Myc (Poland)

28 March 2026
12:00

| Norway | 3–0 | Luxembourg |
|---|---|---|
| Flo 39'; Nakken 48'; Gosik 69' | Report |

Niko Dovana Stadium, Durrës
Attendance: 150
Referee: Mehmet Türkmen (Türkiye)
28 March 2026
15:00

| Albania | 7–1 | Malta |
|---|---|---|
| Durmishi 21', 44', 49'; Kulla 35', 72', 80'; Redzepi 56' | Report | Camilleri 26' |

House of Football Natural Pitch, Tirana
Attendance: 205
Referee: Michele Beltrano (San Marino)

31 March 2026
15:00

| Albania | 2–2 | Norway |
|---|---|---|
| Kulla 52', 90+2' | Report | Solberg 36'; Gosik 41' |

House of Football Natural Pitch, Tirana
Attendance: 214
Referee: Wojciech Myc (Poland)
31 March 2026
15:00

| Malta | 0–4 | Luxembourg |
|---|---|---|
| | Report | Gomes Rodrigues 37'; Tavares Dos Santos 48'; Welter 63'; Polfer 88' |

Niko Dovana Stadium, Durrës
Attendance: 50
Referee: Mehmet Türkmen (Türkiye)

==== Group B5 ====
| Pos | Team | Pld | W | D | L | GF | GA | GD | Pts | Promotion or transfer |
|---|---|---|---|---|---|---|---|---|---|---|
| 1 | Netherlands (H) | 3 | 3 | 0 | 0 | 8 | 0 | +8 | 9 | Promotion to Round 2 League A |
| 2 | Moldova | 3 | 1 | 1 | 1 | 3 | 2 | +1 | 4 | Transfer to Round 2 League B |
| 3 | North Macedonia | 3 | 0 | 2 | 1 | 1 | 5 | −4 | 2 | Transfer to Round 2 League B |
| 4 | Faroe Islands | 3 | 0 | 1 | 2 | 0 | 5 | −5 | 1 | Transfer to Round 2 League B |

Source: UEFA
Rules for classification: Tiebreakers
(H) Hosts
25 March 2026
17:00

| North Macedonia | 0–0 | Faroe Islands |
|---|---|---|
| | Report |

Sportpark De Kranenhof, Escharen
Attendance: 38
Referee: Dmytro Kubriak (Ukraine)
25 March 2026
18:00

| Netherlands | 1–0 | Moldova |
|---|---|---|
| Reulen 26' (pen.) | Report |

Sportpark Zuid, Groesbeek
Attendance: 443
Referee: Mateo Erceg (Croatia)

28 March 2026
12:00

| Faroe Islands | 0–2 | Moldova |
|---|---|---|
| | Report | Roșca 45'; Cornescu 90+1' |

Sportpark Zuid, Groesbeek
Attendance: 42
Referee: Daniyar Sakhi (Kazakhstan)
28 March 2026
16:00

| Netherlands | 4–0 | North Macedonia |
|---|---|---|
| Reulen 8', 53', 87'; Beerens 13' | Report |

Sportpark De Kranenhof, Escharen
Attendance: 490
Referee: Dmytro Kubriak (Ukraine)

31 March 2026
18:00

| Moldova | 1–1 | North Macedonia |
|---|---|---|
| Roșca 21' | Report | Tanchev 54' |

Sportpark De Kranenhof, Escharen
Attendance: 65
Referee: Mateo Erceg (Croatia)
31 March 2026
18:00

| Faroe Islands | 0–3 | Netherlands |
|---|---|---|
| | Report | Reulen 6'; Beerens 53'; Onunta 86' (pen.) |

Sportpark Zuid, Groesbeek
Attendance: 510
Referee: Daniyar Sakhi (Kazakhstan)

==== Group B6 ====
| Pos | Team | Pld | W | D | L | GF | GA | GD | Pts | Promotion or transfer |
|---|---|---|---|---|---|---|---|---|---|---|
| 1 | Lithuania (H) | 2 | 1 | 1 | 0 | 4 | 0 | +4 | 4 | Promotion to Round 2 League A |
| 2 | Northern Ireland | 2 | 1 | 1 | 0 | 2 | 1 | +1 | 4 | Transfer to Round 2 League B |
| 3 | Azerbaijan | 2 | 0 | 0 | 2 | 1 | 6 | −5 | 0 | Transfer to Round 2 League B |

Source: UEFA
Rules for classification: Tiebreakers
(H) Hosts
25 March 2026
17:00

| Azerbaijan | 0–4 | Lithuania |
|---|---|---|
| | Report | Grudzinskas 29', 45+2'; Piazenko 74'; Turčinskas 82' |

Raudondvario stadionas, Raudondvaris
Attendance: 250
Referee: Ion Orlic (Moldova)

28 March 2026
14:00

| Northern Ireland | 2–1 | Azerbaijan |
|---|---|---|
| McGarry 48'; Madden 84' | Report | Ahmadov 25' |

Raudondvario stadionas, Raudondvaris
Attendance: 20
Referee: Miguel Nogueira (Portugal)

31 March 2026
17:00

| Lithuania | 0–0 | Northern Ireland |
|---|---|---|
| | Report |

Raudondvario stadionas, Raudondvaris
Attendance: 177
Referee: Viktor Kopiievskyi (Ukraine)

==== Group B7 ====
| Pos | Team | Pld | W | D | L | GF | GA | GD | Pts | Promotion or transfer |
|---|---|---|---|---|---|---|---|---|---|---|
| 1 | Iceland | 2 | 1 | 1 | 0 | 4 | 3 | +1 | 4 | Promotion to Round 2 League A |
| 2 | Montenegro | 2 | 0 | 2 | 0 | 2 | 2 | 0 | 2 | Transfer to Round 2 League B |
| 3 | Georgia (H) | 2 | 0 | 1 | 1 | 3 | 4 | −1 | 1 | Transfer to Round 2 League B |

Source: UEFA
Rules for classification: Tiebreakers
(H) Hosts
3 June 2026
17:00

| Montenegro | 1−1 | Georgia |
|---|---|---|
| Vukoje 58' | Report | Bartishvili 56' (pen.) |

David Petriashvili Stadium, Tbilisi
Attendance: 1,150
Referee: Joakim Östling (Sweden)

6 June 2026
17:00

| Iceland | 1–1 | Montenegro |
|---|---|---|
| Arnarsson 12' | Report | Vujačić 4' |

David Petriashvili Stadium, Tbilisi
Attendance: 50
Referee: Ashot Ghaltakhchyan (Armenia)

9 June 2026
17:00

| Georgia | 2–3 | Iceland |
|---|---|---|
| Bartishvili 86'; Kharebashvili 90+6' | Report | Kárason 52'; Arnarsson 90+3'; Gunnarsson 90+8' |

David Petriashvili Stadium, Tbilisi
Attendance: 1,000
Referee: Karl Koppel (Estonia)

== Round 2 ==
Each league is composed of seven groups. No teams that played each other in round 1 will meet again in round 2. Teams that played in three-team groups in round 1 are drawn into four-team groups for round 2. The top three teams in each group of League A, and the group winners in each group of League B, qualify for Round 3. Czechia play in League A for round 2 but will not compete in round 3 as their place in the finals is assured as hosts. As per article 13.08c of the competition regulations, if there is a vacancy because Czechia are among the qualified teams or for any other reason, the position is filled by the best fourth-placed team in League A.

=== Draw ===
The Round 2 draw was made at 11:00 CET on 15 June 2026.

The teams were seeded according to their results in Round 1 (Regulations Article 15.01).

==== Teams entering League A ====
Pot 1
| Team | Pos. in group | Pts. | GD | GS | DP |
|---|---|---|---|---|---|
| Spain | 1st / Group A5 | 9 | 8 | 9 | |
| Belgium | 1st / Group A1 | 7 | 7 | 10 | |
| Austria | 1st / Group A4 | 7 | 5 | 8 | |
| Czech Republic | 1st / Group A3 | 7 | 4 | 6 | |
| Italy | 1st / Group A2 | 7 | 4 | 6 | |
| France | 1st / Group A7 | 7 | 2 | 4 | |
| Portugal | 1st / Group A6 | 5 | 1 | 2 | |

Pot 2
| Team | Pos. in group | Pts. | GD | GS | DP |
|---|---|---|---|---|---|
| Sweden | 2nd / Group A1 | 7 | 6 | 11 | |
| Finland | 2nd / Group A3 | 7 | 2 | 5 | |
| England | 2nd / Group A5 | 6 | 3 | 7 | |
| Hungary | 2nd / Group A7 | 4 | 3 | 6 | |
| Israel | 2nd / Group A4 | 4 | 1 | 5 | |
| Greece | 2nd / Group A6 | 4 | 1 | 4 | |
| Scotland | 2nd / Group A2 | 4 | 0 | 6 | |

Pot 3
| Team | Pos. in group | Pts. | GD | GS | DP |
|---|---|---|---|---|---|
| Kazakhstan | 3rd / Group A6 | 4 | 0 | 6 | |
| Germany | 3rd / Group A4 | 4 | −1 | 5 | |
| Wales | 3rd / Group A7 | 4 | −3 | 2 | |
| Ukraine | 3rd / Group A3 | 3 | 1 | 6 | |
| Croatia | 3rd / Group A5 | 3 | −5 | 1 | |
| Slovenia | 3rd / Group A1 | 3 | −6 | 2 | |
| Republic of Ireland | 3rd / Group A2 | 2 | −1 | 5 | |

Pot 4
| Team | Pos. in group | Pts. | GD | GS | DP |
|---|---|---|---|---|---|
| Belarus | 1st / Group B3 | 6 | 6 | 6 | |
| Netherlands | 1st / Group B5 | 6 | 5 | 5 | |
| Lithuania | 1st / Group B6 | 4 | 4 | 4 | |
| Norway | 1st / Group B4 | 4 | 3 | 5 | |
| Romania | 1st / Group B1 | 4 | 2 | 5 | |
| Kosovo | 1st / Group B2 | 4 | 2 | 4 | |
| Iceland | 1st / Group B7 | 4 | 1 | 4 | |

==== Teams entering League B ====
Pot 1
| Team | Pos. in group | Pts. | GD | GS | DP |
|---|---|---|---|---|---|
| Serbia | 4th / Group A6 | 3 | −2 | 2 | |
| Poland | 4th / Group A2 | 2 | −3 | 2 | |
| Switzerland | 4th / Group A7 | 1 | −2 | 5 | |
| Bosnia and Herzegovina | 4th / Group A4 | 1 | −5 | 2 | |
| Bulgaria | 4th / Group A5 | 0 | −6 | 1 | |
| Cyprus | 4th / Group A1 | 0 | −7 | 1 | 6 |
| Estonia | 4th / Group A3 | 0 | −7 | 1 | 8 |

Pot 2
| Team | Pos. in group | Pts. | GD | GS | DP |
|---|---|---|---|---|---|
| Denmark | 2nd / Group B1 | 4 | 1 | 3 | |
| Northern Ireland | 2nd / Group B6 | 4 | 1 | 2 | |
| Luxembourg | 2nd / Group B4 | 3 | −2 | 2 | |
| Montenegro | 2nd / Group B7 | 2 | 0 | 2 | 8 |
| Armenia | 2nd / Group B2 | 2 | 0 | 2 | 12 |
| Moldova | 2nd / Group B5 | 1 | −1 | 1 | |
| Slovakia | 2nd / Group B3 | 1 | −3 | 1 | |

Pot 3
| Team | Pos. in group | Pts. | GD | GS | DP |
|---|---|---|---|---|---|
| Albania | 3rd / Group B4 | 1 | −1 | 3 | 2 |
| Georgia | 3rd / Group B7 | 1 | −1 | 3 | 5 |
| Turkey | 3rd / Group B2 | 1 | −2 | 2 | |
| Latvia | 3rd / Group B3 | 1 | −3 | 1 | |
| North Macedonia | 3rd / Group B5 | 1 | −4 | 1 | |
| Andorra | 3rd / Group B1 | 0 | −3 | 1 | |
| Azerbaijan | 3rd / Group B6 | 0 | −5 | 1 | |

Pot 4
| Team | Pos. in group | Pts. | GD | GS | DP |
|---|---|---|---|---|---|
| Faroe Islands | 4th / Group B5 | 1 | −5 | 0 | |
| San Marino | 4th / Group B3 | 1 | −8 | 2 | |
| Malta | 4th / Group B4 | 0 | −11 | 1 | |
| Liechtenstein | 4th / Group B1 | 0 | −18 | 1 | |
| Gibraltar | 4th / Group B2 | 0 | −23 | 0 | |

=== League A ===
In each group, the top three teams will qualify for Round 3 League A. However, Czechia play in League A for round 2 but will not compete in round 3 as their place in the finals is assured as hosts. Should Czechia qualify for Round 3 League A, that position is filled by the best fourth-placed team in Round 2 League A instead.

==== Group A1 ====
| Pos | Team | Pld | W | D | L | GF | GA | GD | Pts | Transfer or relegation |
|---|---|---|---|---|---|---|---|---|---|---|
| 1 | France (H) | 3 | 2 | 1 | 0 | 10 | 3 | +7 | 7 | Transferred to Round 3 League A |
| 2 | Republic of Ireland | 3 | 1 | 2 | 0 | 6 | 4 | +2 | 5 | Transferred to Round 3 League A |
| 3 | Norway | 3 | 0 | 2 | 1 | 2 | 8 | −6 | 2 | Transferred to Round 3 League A |
| 4 | Greece | 3 | 0 | 1 | 2 | 1 | 4 | −3 | 1 | |

Source: UEFA
Rules for classification: Qualification tiebreakers
(H) Hosts
11 November 2026
15:00

| Republic of Ireland | 2–0 | Greece |
|---|---|---|
| M. Noonan 58'; O'Neill 63' | Report |

Espace Oceane, Plaintel
Attendance: 138
Referee: Mihály Káprály (Hungary)
11 November 2026
18:00

| France | 6–0 | Norway |
|---|---|---|
| Azizi 6'; Chebbi 20'; Goffi 42', 66'; Nguessan 69'; Valero 76' | Report |

EAG Akedemi, Pabu
Attendance: 86
Referee: Mateo Busquets Ferrer (Spain)

14 November 2026
15:00

| Greece | 0−0 | Norway |
|---|---|---|
| | Report |

Espace Oceane, Plaintel
Attendance: 535
Referee: Klym Zabroda (Ukraine)
14 November 2026
18:00

| France | 2–2 | Republic of Ireland |
|---|---|---|
| Chebbi 21', 24' | Report | Leonard 7', 64' |

Stade de Roudourou, Guingamp
Attendance: 355
Referee: Mihály Káprály (Hungary)

17 November 2026
15:00

| Greece | 1–2 | France |
|---|---|---|
| Aretis 46' | Report | Assab 2'; Valero 9' |

EAG Akedemi, Pabu
Attendance: 20
Referee: Mateo Busquets Ferrer (Spain)
17 November 2026
15:00

| Norway | 2–2 | Republic of Ireland |
|---|---|---|
| Woxen 56'; Ademola 90+3' | Report | McAteer 31'; O'Neill 60' |

Espace Oceane, Plaintel
Attendance: 40
Referee: Klym Zabroda (Ukraine)

==== Group A2 ====
| Pos | Team | Pld | W | D | L | GF | GA | GD | Pts | Transfer or relegation |
|---|---|---|---|---|---|---|---|---|---|---|
| 1 | Belgium | 3 | 3 | 0 | 0 | 8 | 1 | +7 | 9 | Transferred to Round 3 League A |
| 2 | Scotland (H) | 3 | 2 | 0 | 1 | 5 | 5 | 0 | 6 | Transferred to Round 3 League A |
| 3 | Kazakhstan | 3 | 1 | 0 | 2 | 2 | 5 | −3 | 3 | Transferred to Round 3 League A |
| 4 | Kosovo | 3 | 0 | 0 | 3 | 0 | 4 | −4 | 0 | |

Source: UEFA
Rules for classification: Qualification tiebreakers
(H) Hosts
11 November 2026
12:15

| Belgium | 2–0 | Kosovo |
|---|---|---|
| Amengai 47'; Da Silva 49' | Report |

Excelsior Stadium, Airdrie
Attendance: 50
Referee: Robin Hensgens (Netherlands)
11 November 2026
16:45

| Kazakhstan | 1–3 | Scotland |
|---|---|---|
| Toleukhan 67' | Report | North 45', 48'; Gillie 78' |

Excelsior Stadium, Airdrie
Attendance: 30
Referee: Oliver Reitala (Finland)

14 November 2026
16:00

| Belgium | 2−0 | Kazakhstan |
|---|---|---|
| De Wannemacker 58', 75' (pen.) | Report |

Broadwood Stadium, Cumbernauld
Attendance: 2,380
Referee: Christos Vergetis (Greece)
14 November 2026
20:30

| Scotland | 1−0 | Kosovo |
|---|---|---|
| North 31' | Report |

Broadwood Stadium, Cumbernauld
Attendance: 156
Referee: Oliver Reitala (Finland)

17 November 2026
16:00

| Scotland | 1−4 | Belgium |
|---|---|---|
| Clearie 23' (pen.) | Report | Elbay 7'; De Brul 45'; Van De Ven 51'; Bisiwu 64' |

Broadwood Stadium, Cumbernauld
Attendance: 52
Referee: Robin Hensgens (Netherlands)
17 November 2026
16:00

| Kosovo | 0−1 | Kazakhstan |
|---|---|---|
| | Report | Dauletov 31' |

Excelsior Stadium, Airdrie
Attendance: 75
Referee: Christos Vergetis (Greece)

==== Group A3 ====
| Pos | Team | Pld | W | D | L | GF | GA | GD | Pts | Transfer or relegation |
|---|---|---|---|---|---|---|---|---|---|---|
| 1 | Germany | 3 | 2 | 0 | 1 | 9 | 5 | +4 | 6 (Note: Ranked on overall goals scored in head-to-head matches: Germany: 4, Portugal: 3, Sweden: 2) | Transferred to Round 3 League A |
| 2 | Portugal (H) | 2 | 2 | 0 | 0 | 4 | 3 | +1 | 6 | Transferred to Round 3 League A |
| 3 | Sweden | 3 | 2 | 0 | 1 | 6 | 3 | +3 | 6 | Transferred to Round 3 League A |
| 4 | Lithuania | 3 | 0 | 0 | 3 | 2 | 10 | −8 | 0 | |

Source: UEFA
Rules for classification: Qualification tiebreakers
(H) Hosts
Notes:
12 November 2026
12:00

| Germany | 2–1 | Sweden |
|---|---|---|
| Ekweribe 85'; Scheller 89' | Report | Saeed 74' |

Municipal Engº Sílvio Henriques Cerveira, Anadia
Attendance: 61
Referee: Miloš Bošković (Montenegro)
12 November 2026
18:00

| Portugal | 1–0 | Lithuania |
|---|---|---|
| Dbouk 81' | Report |

Estádio Municipal de Arouca, Arouca
Attendance: 18
Referee: Bence Csonka (Hungary)

14 November 2026
12:00

| Sweden | 4−1 | Lithuania |
|---|---|---|
| Brantlind 25'; Jakobsson 42'; Jonyla 68' (o.g.); Pavey 76' | Report | Grudzinskas 53' |

Estádio do SC São João de Ver, Santa Maria da Feira
Attendance: 89
Referee: Bence Csonka (Hungary)
14 November 2026
18:00

| Portugal | 3–2 | Germany |
|---|---|---|
| Cunha 44'; Soares 79' (pen.); Quintas 88' | Report | Afri Akumu 19'; Reinhold 50' |

Estádio Carlos Osório, Oliveira de Azeméis
Attendance: 34
Referee: Lukasz Kuzma (Poland)

17 November 2026
16:00

| Sweden | 1–0 | Portugal |
|---|---|---|
| Bergvall 90' | Report |

Estádio Marcolino de Castro, Santa Maria da Feira
Attendance: 116
Referee: Lukasz Kuzma (Poland)
17 November 2026
16:00

| Lithuania | 1–5 | Germany |
|---|---|---|
| Emerhi 6' | Report | Eickel 21' (pen.); Nguefack 35'; Lemke 69'; Isbruch 74'; Ringbeck 85' |

Estádio Carlos Osório, Oliveira de Azeméis
Attendance: 3
Referee: Miloš Bošković (Montenegro)

==== Group A4 ====
| Pos | Team | Pld | W | D | L | GF | GA | GD | Pts | Transfer or relegation |
|---|---|---|---|---|---|---|---|---|---|---|
| 1 | England | 3 | 2 | 0 | 1 | 10 | 5 | +5 | 6 (Note: Goal difference in head-to-head games: England: 2, Austria: 2, Belarus: -4, Goals scored in head-to-head games: England: 6, Austria: 4) | Transferred to Round 3 League A |
| 2 | Austria (H) | 3 | 2 | 0 | 1 | 10 | 2 | +8 | 6 | Transferred to Round 3 League A |
| 3 | Belarus | 3 | 2 | 0 | 1 | 3 | 5 | −2 | 6 | Transferred to Round 3 League A |
| 4 | Slovenia | 3 | 0 | 0 | 3 | 1 | 12 | −11 | 0 | |

Source: UEFA
Rules for classification: Qualification tiebreakers
(H) Hosts
Notes:
11 November 2026
13:00

| Slovenia | 1–4 | England |
|---|---|---|
| Mežnar 38' | Report | Heskey 34', 85'; Kovač 49' (o.g.); Howell 78' |

Sportschule Lindabrunn, Lindabrunn
Attendance: 180
Referee: Ante Čulina (Croatia)
11 November 2026
18:00

| Austria | 0–1 | Belarus |
|---|---|---|
| | Report | Ma. Titov 72' |

Stadion Wiener Neustadt, Wiener Neustadt
Attendance: 583
Referee: Kyriakos Athanasiou (Cyprus)

14 November 2026
13:00

| England | 5−0 | Belarus |
|---|---|---|
| Howell 14'; Page 20'; Heskey 22'; Ezenwata 42' (pen.); Thompson 66' | Report |

Sportschule Lindabrunn, Lindabrunn
Attendance: 200
Referee: Kyriakos Athanasiou (Cyprus)
14 November 2026
18:00

| Austria | 6–0 | Slovenia |
|---|---|---|
| Jozepovic 18'; Jerabek 56', 66', 89'; Masching 62'; Deshishku 72' | Report |

Stadion Wiener Neustadt, Wiener Neustadt
Attendance: 605
Referee: Lukáš Dzivjak (Slovakia)

17 November 2026
14:00

| England | 1–4 | Austria |
|---|---|---|
| Walsh 4' | Report | Krapf 2'; Jozepovic 10'; Jerabek 44'; Moser 80' |

Stadion Wiener Neustadt, Wiener Neustadt
Attendance: 563
Referee: Ante Čulina (Croatia)
17 November 2026
14:00

| Belarus | 2–0 | Slovenia |
|---|---|---|
| Lutskovich 54'; Molchan 75' | Report |

Sportschule Lindabrunn, Lindabrunn
Attendance: 25
Referee: Lukáš Dzivjak (Slovakia)

==== Group A5 ====
| Pos | Team | Pld | W | D | L | GF | GA | GD | Pts | Transfer or relegation |
|---|---|---|---|---|---|---|---|---|---|---|
| 1 | Spain | 3 | 2 | 1 | 0 | 11 | 2 | +9 | 7 | Transferred to Round 3 League A |
| 2 | Finland | 3 | 1 | 1 | 1 | 3 | 10 | −7 | 4 | Transferred to Round 3 League A |
| 3 | Wales (H) | 3 | 0 | 2 | 1 | 3 | 4 | −1 | 2 (Note: Ranked based on penalties, Wales 3–1 Iceland) | Transferred to Round 3 League A |
| 4 | Iceland | 3 | 0 | 2 | 1 | 3 | 4 | −1 | 2 | |

Source: UEFA
Rules for classification: Qualification tiebreakers
(H) Hosts
Notes:
11 November 2026
16:00

| Spain | 2–2 | Iceland |
|---|---|---|
| Ciria 10' (pen.); E. Arnarsson 35' (o.g.) | Report | Gunnarsson 72'; A. Arnarsson 77' |

Newport Stadium, Newport
Attendance: 103
Referee: Márton Rúsz (Hungary)
11 November 2026
20:00

| Wales | 2–2 | Finland |
|---|---|---|
| Gardner 12'; Pita 90' | Report | Katz 45', 88' (pen.) |

Rodney Parade, Newport
Attendance: 337
Referee: Rares Vidican (Romania)

14 November 2026
13:30

| Spain | 1−0 | Wales |
|---|---|---|
| Fernández 70' | Report |

Rodney Parade, Newport
Attendance: 213
Referee: Marek Radina (Czech Republic)
14 November 2026
16:00

| Finland | 1–0 | Iceland |
|---|---|---|
| Kroupkin 87' | Report |

Cardiff International Sports Campus, Cardiff
Attendance: 100
Referee: Rares Vidican (Romania)

17 November 2026
13:00

| Finland | 0–8 | Spain |
|---|---|---|
| | Report | Ciria 20', 30'; T. Fernandez 24', 46'; G. Fernández 38', 44', 73'; Guilén 70' |

Newport Stadium, Newport
Attendance: 40
Referee: Marek Radina (Czech Republic)
17 November 2026
13:00

| Iceland | 1–1 | Wales |
|---|---|---|
| Guðjónsson 45' | Report | Grainger 45+4' |

Rodney Parade, Newport
Attendance: 111
Referee: Márton Rúsz (Hungary)

==== Group A6 ====
| Pos | Team | Pld | W | D | L | GF | GA | GD | Pts | Transfer or relegation |
|---|---|---|---|---|---|---|---|---|---|---|
| 1 | Ukraine | 3 | 2 | 0 | 1 | 4 | 3 | +1 | 6 | Transferred to Round 3 League A |
| 2 | Italy (H) | 3 | 1 | 1 | 1 | 2 | 1 | +1 | 4 | Transferred to Round 3 League A |
| 3 | Israel | 3 | 1 | 1 | 1 | 4 | 4 | 0 | 4 | Transferred to Round 3 League A |
| 4 | Romania | 3 | 1 | 0 | 2 | 2 | 4 | −2 | 3 | Transferred to Round 3 League A |

Source: UEFA
Rules for classification: Qualification tiebreakers
(H) Hosts
11 November 2026
12:00

| Ukraine | 3–2 | Israel |
|---|---|---|
| Diedov 13', 86'; Tkachenko 87' | Report | N. Cohen 10'; Simon 40' |

Stadio Bruno Recchioni, Fermo
Attendance: 34
Referee: Tom Owen (Wales)
11 November 2026
15:30

| Italy | 2–0 | Romania |
|---|---|---|
| Borasio 49', 76' | Report |

Stadio del Conero, Ancona
Attendance: 572
Referee: Florian Lata (Albania)

14 November 2026
12:00

| Israel | 2−1 | Romania |
|---|---|---|
| Luski 85'; Yossef 90+3' | Report | Bota 21' (pen.) |

Stadio Bruno Recchioni, Fermo
Attendance: 84
Referee: Tom Owen (Wales)
14 November 2026
15:30

| Italy | 0–1 | Ukraine |
|---|---|---|
| | Report | Diedov 19' |

Stadio Raffaele Mancini, Fano
Attendance: 932
Referee: Mathieu Vernice (France)

17 November 2026
13:00

| Israel | 0–0 | Italy |
|---|---|---|
| | Report |

Stadio Marcello Bonci, Pesaro
Attendance: 294
Referee: Florian Lata (Albania)
17 November 2026
13:00

| Romania | 1–0 | Ukraine |
|---|---|---|
| Pellegrini 87' | Report |

Stadio del Conero, Ancona
Referee: Mathieu Vernice (France)

==== Group A7 ====
| Pos | Team | Pld | W | D | L | GF | GA | GD | Pts | Transfer or relegation |
|---|---|---|---|---|---|---|---|---|---|---|
| 1 | Croatia (H) | 3 | 2 | 1 | 0 | 8 | 4 | +4 | 7 | Transferred to Round 3 League A |
| 2 | Czech Republic | 3 | 2 | 1 | 0 | 4 | 1 | +3 | 7 | Already qualified for final tournament as hosts |
| 3 | Netherlands | 3 | 1 | 0 | 2 | 4 | 5 | −1 | 3 | Transferred to Round 3 League A |
| 4 | Hungary | 3 | 0 | 0 | 3 | 1 | 7 | −6 | 0 | |

Source: UEFA
Rules for classification: Qualification tiebreakers
(H) Hosts
11 November 2026
12:00

| Croatia | 4–1 | Hungary |
|---|---|---|
| Pajvančić 37'; Kusanović 50', 53'; Papac 74' | Report | Rab 8' |

SRP Trate Nedelišće, Nedelišće
Attendance: 80
Referee: Kamal Umudlu (Azerbaijan)
11 November 2026
14:00

| Czech Republic | 2–0 | Netherlands |
|---|---|---|
| Folprecht 45+1'; Jadrníček 62' | Report |

Sportski park NK Graničar, Kotoriba
Attendance: 100
Referee: Patryk Gryckiewicz (Poland)

14 November 2026
12:00

| Czech Republic | 1−1 | Croatia |
|---|---|---|
| Palaščák 56' | Report | Šivalec 78' |

SRP Trate Nedelišće, Nedelišće
Attendance: 167
Referee: Matteo Marcenaro (Italy)
14 November 2026
14:00

| Hungary | 0–2 | Netherlands |
|---|---|---|
| | Report | Ünüvar 58'; Neijenhuis 79' |

SRP Trate Nedelišće, Nedelišće (Note: Moved from Sportski park NK Graničar, Kotoriba due to bad pitch)
Attendance: 67
Referee: Kamal Umudlu (Azerbaijan)

17 November 2026
12:00

| Hungary | 0–1 | Czech Republic |
|---|---|---|
| | Report | Azaka 90+1' |

City Stadium, Križevci
Attendance: 50
Referee: Matteo Marcenaro (Italy)
17 November 2026
12:00

| Netherlands | 2–3 | Croatia |
|---|---|---|
| Van der Wal 49'; Nash 58' | Report | Kusanović 19' (pen.); Pajvančić 66'; Radoš 81' |

SRP Trate Nedelišće, Nedelišće
Attendance: 85
Referee: Patryk Gryckiewicz (Poland)

=== Ranking of fourth-placed teams ===
Due to Czechia ending in a position qualifying them for Round 3, their place as already qualified hosts will be taken by the best fourth place finisher from Round 2 League A. The other teams are eliminated.

| Pos | Grp | Team | Pld | W | D | L | GF | GA | GD | Pts | Qualification |
|---|---|---|---|---|---|---|---|---|---|---|---|
| 1 | A6 | Romania | 3 | 1 | 0 | 2 | 2 | 4 | −2 | 3 | Transferred to Round 3 League A |
| 2 | A5 | Iceland | 3 | 0 | 2 | 1 | 3 | 4 | −1 | 2 | |
| 3 | A1 | Greece | 3 | 0 | 1 | 2 | 1 | 4 | −3 | 1 | |
| 4 | A2 | Kosovo | 3 | 0 | 0 | 3 | 0 | 4 | −4 | 0 | |
| 5 | A7 | Hungary | 3 | 0 | 0 | 3 | 1 | 7 | −6 | 0 | |
| 6 | A3 | Lithuania | 3 | 0 | 0 | 3 | 2 | 10 | −8 | 0 | |
| 7 | A4 | Slovenia | 3 | 0 | 0 | 3 | 1 | 12 | −11 | 0 | |

Source: UEFA
Rules for classification: 1) points; 2) goal difference; 3) goals scored; 4) away goals scored; 5) wins; 6) away wins; 7) disciplinary points; 8) coefficient ranking.

=== League B ===
==== Group B1 ====
| Pos | Team | Pld | W | D | L | GF | GA | GD | Pts | Promotion or transfer |
|---|---|---|---|---|---|---|---|---|---|---|
| 1 | Montenegro | 3 | 3 | 0 | 0 | 11 | 4 | +7 | 9 | Promotion to Round 3 League A |
| 2 | Serbia (H) | 3 | 2 | 0 | 1 | 10 | 4 | +6 | 6 | |
| 3 | Azerbaijan | 3 | 1 | 0 | 2 | 4 | 11 | −7 | 3 | |
| 4 | Faroe Islands | 3 | 0 | 0 | 3 | 1 | 7 | −6 | 0 | |

Source: UEFA
Rules for classification: Tiebreakers
(H) Hosts
11 November 2026
11:00

| Azerbaijan | 2–7 | Montenegro |
|---|---|---|
| Aliyev 31' (pen.); Chodarov 79' | Report | Bubanja 5'; Knežević 13', 64'; Mijović 18'; Lesjak 19'; Jovanović 27', 45+3' |

FK Voždovac, Belgrade
Attendance: 40
Referee: Lothar D'hondt (Belgium)
11 November 2026
17:00

| Serbia | 4–1 | Faroe Islands |
|---|---|---|
| Šarić 54' (pen.); Milovanović 61'; Damjanović 71'; Jovanović 76' | Report | Reynheim 45+1' (pen.) |

Stadium Sportski centar Mladost, Pančevo
Attendance: 100
Referee: Benjamin Brand (Germany)

14 November 2026
11:00

| Montenegro | 1–0 | Faroe Islands |
|---|---|---|
| Bubanja 14' | Report |

FK Voždovac, Belgrade
Attendance: 100
Referee: Lothar D'hondt (Belgium)
14 November 2026
16:00

| Serbia | 4–0 | Azerbaijan |
|---|---|---|
| Šarić 40' (pen.); Milovanović 70'; Ostojić 73', 79' | Report |

Stadium Sportski centar Mladost, Pančevo
Attendance: 145
Referee: Oguzhan Çakir (Turkey)

17 November 2026
16:00

| Montenegro | 3–2 | Serbia |
|---|---|---|
| Knežević 7'; Mijović 10'; Jovanović 29' | Report | Ostojić 30'; Šarić 45+1' |

Stadium Sportski centar Mladost, Pančevo
Attendance: 240
Referee: Benjamin Brand (Germany)
17 November 2026
16:00

| Faroe Islands | 0–2 | Azerbaijan |
|---|---|---|
| | Report | Salimov 16'; Camara 67' (pen.) |

FK Voždovac, Belgrade
Attendance: 27
Referee: Oguzhan Çakir (Turkey)

==== Group B2 ====
| Pos | Team | Pld | W | D | L | GF | GA | GD | Pts | Promotion or transfer |
|---|---|---|---|---|---|---|---|---|---|---|
| 1 | Denmark | 3 | 3 | 0 | 0 | 11 | 2 | +9 | 9 | Promotion to Round 3 League A |
| 2 | Bosnia and Herzegovina | 3 | 2 | 0 | 1 | 7 | 3 | +4 | 6 | |
| 3 | Georgia | 3 | 1 | 0 | 2 | 3 | 8 | −5 | 3 | |
| 4 | San Marino (H) | 3 | 0 | 0 | 3 | 1 | 9 | −8 | 0 | |

Source: UEFA
Rules for classification: Tiebreakers
(H) Hosts
11 November 2026
11:00

| Georgia | 2–5 | Denmark |
|---|---|---|
| Mikautadze 40' (pen.); Shatirishvili 68' | Report | Bunten 7'; Ambæk 9'; Faber 34'; Shatirishvili 50' (o.g.); Gammelgaard 56' |

Stadio Ezio Conti di Dogana, Dogana
Attendance: 20
Referee: Alexandros Tsakalidis (Greece)
11 November 2026
16:30

| Bosnia and Herzegovina | 4–1 | San Marino |
|---|---|---|
| Šunjić 27', 73' (pen.); Dragović 53', 88' (pen.) | Report | Grandoni 59' |

Stadio Ezio Conti di Dogana, Dogana
Attendance: 130
Referee: Sven Wolfensberger (Switzerland)

14 November 2026
11:00

| Bosnia and Herzegovina | 3–0 | Georgia |
|---|---|---|
| Nišić 48', 70' (pen.); Mustafić 51' | Report |

Stadio Ezio Conti di Dogana, Dogana
Attendance: 102
Referee: Alexandros Tsakalidis (Greece)
14 November 2026
16:30

| Denmark | 4–0 | San Marino |
|---|---|---|
| Pimpong 25'; Montali 34' (o.g.); Fenger 39'; Storch 90+2' | Report |

Stadio Ezio Conti di Dogana, Dogana
Attendance: 205
Referee: Bulat Sariyev (Kazakhstan)

17 November 2026
11:00

| Denmark | 2–0 | Bosnia and Herzegovina |
|---|---|---|
| Ambæk 51'; Bunten 60' | Report |

Stadio Ezio Conti di Dogana, Dogana
Attendance: 96
Referee: Sven Wolfensberger (Switzerland)
17 November 2026
16:30

| San Marino | 0–1 | Georgia |
|---|---|---|
| | Report | Dzerkorashvili 26' |

Stadio Ezio Conti di Dogana, Dogana
Attendance: 74
Referee: Bulat Sariyev (Kazakhstan)

==== Group B3 ====
| Pos | Team | Pld | W | D | L | GF | GA | GD | Pts | Promotion or transfer |
|---|---|---|---|---|---|---|---|---|---|---|
| 1 | Estonia | 3 | 3 | 0 | 0 | 10 | 2 | +8 | 9 | Promotion to Round 3 League A |
| 2 | Turkey (H) | 3 | 2 | 0 | 1 | 15 | 6 | +9 | 6 | |
| 3 | Slovakia | 3 | 1 | 0 | 2 | 8 | 4 | +4 | 3 | |
| 4 | Liechtenstein | 3 | 0 | 0 | 3 | 3 | 24 | −21 | 0 | |

Source: UEFA
Rules for classification: Tiebreakers
(H) Hosts
11 November 2026
11:00

| Estonia | 6–1 | Liechtenstein |
|---|---|---|
| Schwarz 22', 24', 28', 50'; Hint 45+2' (pen.); Kaares 58' | Report | Wohlwend 4' |

Arslan Zeki Demirci Sports Complex, Antalya
Attendance: 20
Referee: Pavle Ilić (Serbia)
11 November 2026
14:00

| Turkey | 3–1 | Slovakia |
|---|---|---|
| Tosun 15'; İbik 20' (pen.); Ayyildiz 48' | Report | Kendera 89' |

Arslan Zeki Demirci Sports Complex, Antalya
Attendance: 122
Referee: Anojen Kanagasingam (Switzerland)

14 November 2026
11:00

| Slovakia | 7–0 | Liechtenstein |
|---|---|---|
| Kendera 2', 41'; Novák 13', 26'; Treplan 22'; Mateáš 39'; Baláž 75' | Report |

Arslan Zeki Demirci Sports Complex, Antalya
Attendance: 30
Referee: Luca Zufferli (Italy)
14 November 2026
14:00

| Estonia | 3–1 | Turkey |
|---|---|---|
| Marmei 44'; Visse 77'; Valdmets 90+2' | Report | Torunoğulları 54' |

Arslan Zeki Demirci Sports Complex, Antalya
Attendance: 87
Referee: Pavle Ilić (Serbia)

17 November 2026
11:00

| Slovakia | 0–1 | Estonia |
|---|---|---|
| | Report | Schwarz 40' |

Arslan Zeki Demirci Sports Complex, Antalya
Attendance: 15
Referee: Anojen Kanagasingam (Switzerland)
17 November 2026
11:00

| Liechtenstein | 2–11 | Turkey |
|---|---|---|
| Memaj 28' (pen.), 41' | Report | Ilçin 21'; Karadeniz 48', 53', 63', 68', 85'; Kurtal 60'; Ünal 69'; Özcan 81'; Torunoğulları 88'; Aslan 90+2' |

Arslan Zeki Demirci Sports Complex, Antalya
Attendance: 74
Referee: Luca Zufferli (Italy)

==== Group B4 ====
| Pos | Team | Pld | W | D | L | GF | GA | GD | Pts | Promotion or transfer |
|---|---|---|---|---|---|---|---|---|---|---|
| 1 | Latvia | 3 | 2 | 1 | 0 | 16 | 3 | +13 | 7 | Promotion to Round 3 League A |
| 2 | Bulgaria (H) | 3 | 2 | 1 | 0 | 14 | 3 | +11 | 7 | |
| 3 | Moldova | 3 | 1 | 0 | 2 | 8 | 10 | −2 | 3 | |
| 4 | Gibraltar | 3 | 0 | 0 | 3 | 1 | 23 | −22 | 0 | |

Source: UEFA
Rules for classification: Tiebreakers
(H) Hosts
11 November 2026
13:30

| Latvia | 3–1 | Moldova |
|---|---|---|
| Brūns 24'; Doroņins 49'; Ščerbinskis 88' | Report | Roșca 61' (pen.) |

Stadion Hadzhi Dimitar, Sliven
Attendance: 42
Referee: Antoine Chiaramonti (Andorra)
11 November 2026
15:00

| Bulgaria | 6–0 | Gibraltar |
|---|---|---|
| Gogev 10', 18', 36'; Tunchev 25'; Manolev 63'; Goryanov 79' | Report |

Stadion Beroe, Stara Zagora
Attendance: 45
Referee: Ryan Lee (Scotland)

14 November 2026
13:30

| Moldova | 5−0 | Gibraltar |
|---|---|---|
| Gușan 3', 19'; Montovio 42' (o.g.); Jeju 59'; Josan 81' | Report |

Stadion Hadzhi Dimitar, Sliven
Attendance: 20
Referee: Antoine Chiaramonti (Andorra)
14 November 2026
15:00

| Bulgaria | 1−1 | Latvia |
|---|---|---|
| Manolev 86' | Report | Butriks 6' |

Stadion Beroe, Stara Zagora
Attendance: 108
Referee: David Da Silva (Portugal)

17 November 2026
13:30

| Moldova | 2–7 | Bulgaria |
|---|---|---|
| Pavlenco 34'; Jeju 84' (pen.) | Report | Manolev 15'; Genchev 21'; Kostenski 39', 71'; Toufas 43'; Peychev 80'; Bozhkov 90+1' (pen.) |

Stadion Beroe, Stara Zagora
Attendance: 45
Referee: David Da Silva (Portugal)
17 November 2026
13:30

| Gibraltar | 1–12 | Latvia |
|---|---|---|
| Murien 48' | Report | Doroņins 13', 27', 50', 78'; Ščerbinskis 25', 88'; Šmaukstelis 40'; Lākutis 45'; Bombāns 53', 55'; Rekmanis 70'; Dzenītis 89' |

Stadion Hadzhi Dimitar, Sliven
Attendance: 26
Referee: Ryan Lee (Scotland)

==== Group B5 ====
| Pos | Team | Pld | W | D | L | GF | GA | GD | Pts | Promotion or transfer |
|---|---|---|---|---|---|---|---|---|---|---|
| 1 | Switzerland | 3 | 3 | 0 | 0 | 9 | 0 | +9 | 9 | Promotion to Round 3 League A |
| 2 | Northern Ireland | 3 | 1 | 1 | 1 | 3 | 3 | 0 | 4 | |
| 3 | North Macedonia (H) | 3 | 1 | 1 | 1 | 3 | 3 | 0 | 4 | |
| 4 | Malta | 3 | 0 | 0 | 3 | 3 | 12 | −9 | 0 | |

Source: UEFA
Rules for classification: Tiebreakers
(H) Hosts
11 November 2026
13:00

| North Macedonia | 0–0 | Northern Ireland |
|---|---|---|
| | Report |

Stadion Kukuš, Strumica
Attendance: 120
Referee: Oscar Johnson (Sweden)
11 November 2026
15:00

| Switzerland | 6–0 | Malta |
|---|---|---|
| Scherrer 3', 38'; Koloto 12' (pen.); Sahin 22'; Lhakpa 71'; Llukes 77' | Report |

Stadion Mladost, Strumica
Attendance: 30
Referee: Marius Hansen Grøtta (Norway)

14 November 2026
13:00

| Switzerland | 1−0 | North Macedonia |
|---|---|---|
| Odin 32' | Report |

Stadion Kukuš, Strumica
Attendance: 200
Referee: Marc Nagtegaal (Netherlands)
14 November 2026
13:00

| Northern Ireland | 3−1 | Malta |
|---|---|---|
| Kerr 27' (pen.); Leacock 37'; McEvoy 69' | Report | Gaerty 74' |

Stadion Mladost, Strumica
Attendance: 50
Referee: Marius Hansen Grøtta (Norway)

17 November 2026
12:00

| Northern Ireland | 0–2 | Switzerland |
|---|---|---|
| | Report | Koloto 9'; Bruchez 28' |

Stadion Mladost, Strumica
Attendance: 30
Referee: Oscar Johnson (Sweden)
17 November 2026
12:00

| Malta | 2–3 | North Macedonia |
|---|---|---|
| Newell 76'; Attard 89' (pen.) | Report | Cvetkovski 32'; Stojkovski 81' (pen.); Taleski 90+2' |

Stadion Kukuš, Strumica
Attendance: 100
Referee: Marc Nagtegaal (Netherlands)

==== Group B6 ====
| Pos | Team | Pld | W | D | L | GF | GA | GD | Pts | Promotion or transfer |
|---|---|---|---|---|---|---|---|---|---|---|
| 1 | Albania | 2 | 2 | 0 | 0 | 4 | 0 | +4 | 6 | Promotion to Round 3 League A |
| 2 | Armenia | 2 | 0 | 1 | 1 | 2 | 6 | −4 | 1 | |
| 3 | Cyprus (H) | 2 | 0 | 1 | 1 | 2 | 6 | −4 | 1 | |

Source: UEFA
Rules for classification: Tiebreakers
(H) Hosts
11 November 2026
13:30

| Albania | 4–0 | Cyprus |
|---|---|---|
| Kulla 23'; Muslika 48', 66'; Himallari 80' | Report |

Sotira Municipal Stadium, Sotira
Attendance: 74
Referee: Michele Beltrano (San Marino)

14 November 2026
13:30

| Armenia | 0–4 | Albania |
|---|---|---|
| | Report | Muslika 4'; Kulla 45+3', 74'; Vukaj 61' |

Sotira Municipal Stadium, Sotira
Attendance: 38
Referee: Jacob Karlsen (Denmark)

17 November 2026
13:30

| Cyprus | 2–2 | Armenia |
|---|---|---|
| Rotis 19' (pen.); Savva 46' | Report | Davtyan 26' (pen.); Batoian 32' |

Sotira Municipal Stadium, Sotira
Attendance: 112
Referee: Vilius Paulauskas (Lithuania)

==== Group B7 ====
| Pos | Team | Pld | W | D | L | GF | GA | GD | Pts | Promotion or transfer |
|---|---|---|---|---|---|---|---|---|---|---|
| 1 | Poland (H) | 2 | 2 | 0 | 0 | 7 | 1 | +6 | 6 | Promotion to Round 3 League A |
| 2 | Luxembourg | 2 | 1 | 0 | 1 | 5 | 2 | +3 | 3 | |
| 3 | Andorra | 2 | 0 | 0 | 2 | 0 | 9 | −9 | 0 | |

Source: UEFA
Rules for classification: Tiebreakers
(H) Hosts
11 November 2026
12:00

| Andorra | 0–5 | Poland |
|---|---|---|
| | Report | Szymczak 4'; Burkiewicz 29', 44'; Zalewski 50'; Śledziński 87' |

Przeworsk Municipal Stadium, Przeworsk
Attendance: 880
Referee: Miloš Savović (Montenegro)

14 November 2026
12:00

| Luxembourg | 4–0 | Andorra |
|---|---|---|
| Carolei 18', 35'; Gomes Rodrigues 73'; Monteiro Ruiz 90+4' | Report |

Przeworsk Municipal Stadium, Przeworsk
Attendance: 461
Referee: Giorgi Avazashvili (Georgia)

17 November 2026
12:00

| Poland | 2–1 | Luxembourg |
|---|---|---|
| Rostek 61'; Lauryn 83' | Report | Rodrigues 67' |

Leżajsk Municipal Stadium, Leżajsk
Attendance: 942
Referee: Dominik Starý (Czech Republic)

== Round 3 ==
Round 3 will only consist of a league A with the final 28 teams in contention to qualify for the 2027 UEFA European Under-19 Championship, each of the seven groups is composed of four teams. No teams that played each other in round 2 will meet again in round 3.

=== Draw ===
The teams were seeded according to their results in Round 2 (Regulations Article 15.01). For League B, the results of matches against fourth-placed teams are not taken into account for the purposes of ranking group winners. For League A all matches are taken into account as all Round 2 groups had the same size.

Pot 1
| Team | Pos. in group | Pts. | GD | GS | DP |
|---|---|---|---|---|---|
| Belgium | 1st / Group A2 | 9 | +7 | 8 | |
| Spain | 1st / Group A5 | 7 | +9 | 11 | |
| France | 1st / Group A1 | 7 | +7 | 10 | |
| Croatia | 1st / Group A7 | 7 | +4 | 8 | |
| England | 1st / Group A4 | 6 | +5 | 10 | |
| Germany | 1st / Group A3 | 6 | +4 | 9 | |
| Ukraine | 1st / Group A6 | 6 | +1 | 4 | |

Pot 2
| Team | Pos. in group | Pts. | GD | GS | DP |
|---|---|---|---|---|---|
| Austria | 2nd / Group A4 | 6 | +8 | 10 | |
| Portugal | 2nd / Group A3 | 6 | +1 | 4 | |
| Scotland | 2nd / Group A2 | 6 | +0 | 5 | |
| Republic of Ireland | 2nd / Group A1 | 5 | +2 | 6 | |
| Italy | 2nd / Group A6 | 4 | +1 | 2 | |
| Finland | 2nd / Group A5 | 4 | −7 | 3 | |
| Sweden | 3rd / Group A3 | 6 | +3 | 6 | |

Pot 3
| Team | Pos. in group | Pts. | GD | GS | DP |
|---|---|---|---|---|---|
| Belarus | 3rd / Group A4 | 6 | −2 | 3 | |
| Israel | 3rd / Group A6 | 4 | +0 | 4 | |
| Netherlands | 3rd / Group A7 | 3 | −1 | 4 | |
| Kazakhstan | 3rd / Group A2 | 3 | −3 | 3 | |
| Wales | 3rd / Group A5 | 2 | −1 | 3 | |
| Norway | 3rd / Group A1 | 2 | −6 | 2 | |
| Romania | 4th / Group A6 | 3 | −2 | 2 | |

Pot 4
| Team | Pos. in group | Pts. | GD | GS | DP |
|---|---|---|---|---|---|
| Montenegro | 1st / Group B1 | 6 | +6 | 10 | |
| Poland | 1st / Group B7 | 6 | +6 | 7 | |
| Denmark | 1st / Group B2 | 6 | +5 | 7 | |
| Albania | 1st / Group B6 | 6 | +4 | 4 | |
| Estonia | 1st / Group B3 | 6 | +3 | 4 | |
| Switzerland | 1st / Group B5 | 6 | +3 | 0 | |
| Latvia | 1st / Group B4 | 4 | +2 | 4 | |

== Goalscorers ==
In Round 1, there have been 261 goals scored in 78 matches, for an average of 3.35 goals per match (as of 9 June 2026).

In Round 2, there have been 293 goals scored in 78 matches, for an average of 3.76 goals per match (as of 17 November 2026).

In total, there have been 554 goals scored in 156 matches, for an average of 3.55 goals per match (as of 17 November 2026).

8 goals

- (Albania) Gabriel Kulla

7 goals

- (Turkey) Thierry Karadeniz

5 goals

- (Belarus) Andrei Lutskovich
- (Estonia) Rafael Siim Schwarz
- (Hungary) Bence Rab
- (Latvia) Nikita Doroņins
- (Netherlands) Pepijn Reulen
- (Romania) Fernando Pellegrini
- (Spain) Alexis Ciria
- (Sweden) Benjamin Brantlind

4 goals

- (Albania) Arman Durmishi
- (Austria) Bruno Jerabek
- (Bosnia and Herzegovina) Said Nišić
- (England) Chizaram Ezenwata
- (England) Reigan Heskey
- (Finland) Bruno Katz
- (France) Antoine Valero
- (Kosovo) Lorik Mehmeti
- (Scotland) Tommy North
- (Switzerland) Nevio Scherrer

3 goals

- (Albania) Armend Muslika
- (Armenia) David Batoian
- (Austria) Nicolas Jozepovic
- (Belgium) Aaron Murenzi
- (Belgium) Terry Van De Ven
- (Bulgaria) Emiliyan Gogev
- (Bulgaria) Daniel Manolev
- (Croatia) Tino Kusanović
- (Denmark) Malik Pimpong
- (France) Mohamed Chebbi
- (Germany) Alexander Staff
- (Iceland) Alexander Ingi Arnarsson
- (Israel) Ilay Ben Simon
- (Italy) Antonio Arena
- (Kazakhstan) Ismail Bekbolat
- (Latvia) Aleks Ščerbinskis
- (Luxembourg) Jess Gomes Rodrigues
- (Moldova) Bogdan Roșca
- (Montenegro) Matija Jovanović
- (Montenegro) Vukota Knežević
- (Serbia) Dimitrije Šarić
- (Slovakia) Peter Kendera
- (Slovakia) Adam Rajnoha
- (Spain) Guille Fernández
- (Spain) Toni Fernández
- (Spain) Miguel Llorente
- (Sweden) Ahmed Saeed
- (Ukraine) Oleksandr Diedov

2 goals

- (Andorra) Cesar González
- (Armenia) Zhirair Ashikian
- (Armenia) Maykl Asiryan
- (Armenia) Davit Davtyan
- (Austria) Hasan Deshishku
- (Austria) Paul Krapf
- (Austria) Nico Masching
- (Belarus) Zakhar Drachou
- (Belarus) Yan Priemko
- (Belgium) August De Wannemacker
- (Bosnia and Herzegovina) Eldar Dragović
- (Bosnia and Herzegovina) Ante Šunjić
- (Bulgaria) Rostislav Kostenski
- (Croatia) Niko Pajvančić
- (Czech Republic) Nikola Jadrníček
- (Czech Republic) Vít Škrkoň
- (Denmark) Jacob Ambæk
- (Denmark) Frederik Bunten
- (Denmark) Julius Lucena
- (England) Harry Howell
- (France) Maxima Goffi
- (Georgia (country)) Andria Bartishvili
- (Greece) Dimitrios Berdos
- (Iceland) Gabríel Snær Gunnarsson
- (Italy) Benit Borasio
- (Italy) Thomas Campaniello
- (Kosovo) Donart Ahmeti
- (Kosovo) Rin Ahmeti
- (Latvia) Georgijs Bombāns
- (Liechtenstein) Erjon Memaj
- (Lithuania) Dovas Grudzinskas
- (Luxembourg) Luca Carolei
- (Moldova) Justin Gușan
- (Moldova) Ivan Jeju
- (Montenegro) Viktor Bubanja
- (Montenegro) Veljko Mijović
- (Netherlands) Jairo Beerens
- (Norway) Igor Fabian Gosik
- (Poland) Antoni Burkiewicz
- (Portugal) Tomás Soares
- (Republic of Ireland) Vinnie Leonard
- (Republic of Ireland) Kian McMahon-Brown
- (Republic of Ireland) Billy O'Neill
- (Romania) Sebastian Banu
- (Romania) Hunor Batzula
- (Romania) Alexandru Bota
- (Romania) Raul Cojocariu
- (Romania) Mario David
- (Scotland) Aiden McCallion
- (Serbia) David Milovanović
- (Serbia) Jovan Ostojić
- (Slovakia) Simon Baláž
- (Slovakia) Maroš Novák
- (Switzerland) Giacomo Koloto
- (Switzerland) Denis Sahin
- (Sweden) Axel Brönner
- (Turkey) Hasan Akdoğan
- (Turkey) Emin Torunoğulları
- (Ukraine) Dmytro Zudin
- (Wales) Louie Bradbury

1 goal

- (Albania) Alen Vukaj
- (Albania) Elson Himallari
- (Albania) Enis Rexhepi
- (Andorra) Manel Anglada
- (Armenia) Daniel Ambartsumov
- (Armenia) Albert Gareginyan
- (Armenia) Martun Hovhannisyan
- (Armenia) Harutyun Movsisyan
- (Austria) Dino Delić
- (Austria) Tare Ekereokosu
- (Austria) Johannes Moser
- (Austria) Sergej Savic
- (Austria) Christopher Wölbl
- (Azerbaijan) Tunjay Ahmadov
- (Azerbaijan) Ali Aliyev
- (Azerbaijan) Moustafa Camara
- (Azerbaijan) Muhammad Chodarov
- (Azerbaijan) Umid Salimov
- (Belarus) Yegor Molchan
- (Belarus) Marat Titov
- (Belarus) Siarhei Zhyvushka
- (Belgium) Naim Amengai
- (Belgium) Jesse Bisiwu
- (Belgium) Maxime De Brul
- (Belgium) Ali Camara
- (Belgium) Mohamed Elbay
- (Belgium) Wout Gielen
- (Belgium) Wout Kapers
- (Belgium) Arthur De Kimpe
- (Belgium) René Mitongo
- (Belgium) Jessi Da Silva
- (Bosnia and Herzegovina) Adem Mustafić
- (Bulgaria) Kaloyan Bozhkov
- (Bulgaria) Nikola Genchev
- (Bulgaria) Kristiyan Goryanov
- (Bulgaria) Martin Peychev
- (Bulgaria) Borislav Stoichkov
- (Bulgaria) Athanasios Toufas
- (Bulgaria) Aleks Tunchev
- (Croatia) Raul Kumar
- (Croatia) Vito Papac
- (Croatia) Krešimir Radoš
- (Croatia) Gabrijel Šivalec
- (Cyprus) Panagiotis Ilia
- (Cyprus) Rompertos Rotis
- (Cyprus) Vladimiros Savva
- (Czech Republic) Lewis Azaka
- (Czech Republic) Michal Folprecht
- (Czech Republic) Ondřej Frolík
- (Czech Republic) Filip Hruška
- (Czech Republic) Jan Jakub Janega
- (Czech Republic) Martin Palaščák
- (Denmark) Adam Amrani
- (Denmark) William Faber
- (Denmark) Oskar Fenger
- (Denmark) Nicolas Gammelgaard
- (Denmark) Johan Hvistendahl
- (Denmark) Viggo Poulsen
- (Denmark) Villads Rutkjær
- (Denmark) Christian Storch
- (England) Dean Benamar
- (England) Lorenz Hutchinson
- (England) Louis Page
- (England) Tynan Thompson
- (England) Reggie Walsh
- (Estonia) Trevor Hint
- (Estonia) Andero Kaares
- (Estonia) Karl Mägi
- (Estonia) Mark Marmei
- (Estonia) Remo Valdmets
- (Estonia) Aston Visse
- (Faroe Islands) Dávid Reynheim
- (Finland) Ahti Haikala
- (Finland) Nicklas Kroupkin
- (Finland) Leevi Palmula
- (Finland) Nicholas Vainio
- (France) Aymen Assab
- (France) Ilyas Azizi
- (France) Jean-Baptiste Bosey
- (France) Djylian Nguessan
- (Georgia (country)) Erekle Dzerkorashvili
- (Georgia (country)) Saba Kharebashvili
- (Georgia (country)) Sandro Mikautadze
- (Georgia (country)) Mate Shatirishvili
- (Germany) Maik Afri Akumu
- (Germany) Lasse Eickel
- (Germany) Kevin Ekweribe
- (Germany) Yll Gashi
- (Germany) Lasse Isbruch
- (Germany) Louis Lemke
- (Germany) Mathieu Nguefack
- (Germany) Jasper Reinhold
- (Germany) Noah Ringbeck
- (Germany) Niklas Scheller
- (Germany) Maximilian Theuer
- (Gibraltar) Shaun Murien
- (Greece) Antonios Aretis
- (Greece) Nikolaos Avramoulis
- (Greece) Konstantinos Toursounidis
- (Hungary) Ádám Nyers
- (Hungary) Zsombor Varga
- (Iceland) Alexander Guðjónsson
- (Iceland) Sigurður Breki Kárason
- (Israel) Liroy Avrevaya
- (Israel) Noam Cohen
- (Israel) Adam Grimberg
- (Israel) Noam Levy
- (Israel) Liam Luski
- (Israel) Ido Yossef
- (Italy) Dauda Iddrisa
- (Kazakhstan) Shakhmurat Dauletov
- (Kazakhstan) Tore Ismagulov
- (Kazakhstan) Aldiyar Nurgali
- (Kazakhstan) Alamgir Smakov
- (Kazakhstan) Abylay Toleukhan
- (Kosovo) Leonit Gabrica
- (Kosovo) Diart Gashi
- (Kosovo) Agon Uka
- (Latvia) Olivers Beķeris
- (Latvia) Patriks Brūns
- (Latvia) Artjoms Butriks
- (Latvia) Olivers Dzenītis
- (Latvia) Lauris Lākutis
- (Latvia) Kristaps Rekmanis
- (Latvia) Emīls Šmaukstelis
- (Liechtenstein) Jason Beck
- (Liechtenstein) Johannes Wohlwend
- (Lithuania) Grant Emerhi
- (Lithuania) Dovas Grudzinskas
- (Lithuania) Rodion Piazenko
- (Lithuania) Jugas Turčinskas
- (Luxembourg) Hamza Kadamani
- (Luxembourg) Preston Da Silva Dos Paciencia
- (Luxembourg) Jona Polfer
- (Luxembourg) Lohan Monteiro Ruiz
- (Luxembourg) Alexandre Tavares Dos Santos
- (Luxembourg) Scott Welter
- (Malta) Denzel Attard
- (Malta) Jack Camilleri
- (Malta) Ben Gaerty
- (Malta) Zyas Newell
- (Moldova) Iustin Cornescu
- (Moldova) Nichita Josan
- (Moldova) Nichita Pavlenco
- (Montenegro) Viktor Lesjak
- (Montenegro) Kosta Vujačić
- (Montenegro) Andrija Vukoje
- (Netherlands) Pharrel Nash
- (Netherlands) Kelvin Neijenhuis
- (Netherlands) Izu Onunta
- (Netherlands) Emre Ünüvar
- (Netherlands) Gilles van der Wal
- (Northern Ireland) Joel Kerr
- (Northern Ireland) Callum Leacock
- (Northern Ireland) Coran Madden
- (Northern Ireland) Jay McEvoy
- (Northern Ireland) Shea McGarry
- (North Macedonia) Filip Cvetkovski
- (North Macedonia) Jakov Stojkovski
- (North Macedonia) Gabriel Taleski
- (North Macedonia) Ivan Tanchev
- (Norway) Sebastian Ademola
- (Norway) Elias Svedal Flo
- (Norway) Daniel Risan Nakken
- (Norway) Oscar Oppedal
- (Norway) Elias Johnsson Solberg
- (Norway) Harald Woxen
- (Poland) Mateusz Lauryn
- (Poland) Pascal Mozie
- (Poland) Filip Przybyłko
- (Poland) Krystian Rostek
- (Poland) Eryk Śledziński
- (Poland) Wojciech Szymczak
- (Poland) Zachary Zalewski
- (Portugal) Duarte Cunha
- (Portugal) Gabriel Dbouk
- (Portugal) Eduardo Felicíssimo
- (Portugal) Rafael Quintas
- (Republic of Ireland) Rory Finneran
- (Republic of Ireland) Gavin McAteer
- (Republic of Ireland) Oisin McDonagh
- (Republic of Ireland) Michael Noonan
- (Republic of Ireland) Cillian Tollett
- (Romania) Ștefan Amarandei
- (Romania) Rares Coman
- (Romania) Andrei Roateș
- (San Marino) Leone Arlotti
- (San Marino) Giacomo Grandoni
- (San Marino) Federico Raschi
- (Scotland) Lucas Clearie
- (Scotland) Lewis Gillie
- (Scotland) Jack Mcgrath
- (Scotland) Alexander Smith
- (Scotland) Joseph Teasdale
- (Serbia) Aleksa Damjanović
- (Serbia) Luka Jovanović
- (Serbia) William Reece Millwood
- (Serbia) David Milovanović
- (Slovakia) Máté Fehér
- (Slovakia) Maxim Mateáš
- (Slovakia) Branislav Treplan
- (Slovenia) Jan Kovačič
- (Slovenia) Kristjan Kozar
- (Slovenia) Florijan Mežnar
- (Spain) Asier Bonel
- (Spain) Manuel Ángel Castillo
- (Spain) Dani Fernández
- (Spain) Nico Guilén
- (Spain) Carlos Maciá
- (Sweden) Rasmus Bergvall
- (Sweden) Filip Jakobsson
- (Sweden) Kevin Filling
- (Sweden) Charlie Pavey
- (Sweden) Emil Sadarangani
- (Sweden) Haydar Sultan
- (Switzerland) Ethan Bruchez
- (Switzerland) Norbu Lhakpa
- (Switzerland) Adrien Llukes
- (Switzerland) Yanis Odin
- (Switzerland) Jill Stiel
- (Turkey) Erk Aslan
- (Turkey) Hasan Ayyildiz
- (Turkey) Tuna Demir
- (Turkey) Ozan Demirbağ
- (Turkey) Boran Eligüzel
- (Turkey) Ada İbik
- (Turkey) Hasan Ilçin
- (Turkey) Yusuf Can Karademir
- (Turkey) Yusuf Kahraman
- (Turkey) Utku Kurtal
- (Turkey) Vatan Özcan
- (Turkey) Mustafa Tosun
- (Turkey) Yunus Ünal
- (Ukraine) Oleksandr Balakai
- (Ukraine) Matvii Bodnar
- (Ukraine) Vitaliy Hlyut
- (Ukraine) Pavlo Liusin
- (Ukraine) Oleksandr Tkachenko
- (Wales) Luis Gardner
- (Wales) William Grainger
- (Wales) Shea Pita

1 own goal

- Nikolas Matić (against Croatia)
- (Georgia (country)) Mate Shatirishvili (against Denmark)
- (Gibraltar) Theo Montovio (against Moldova)
- (Iceland) Egill Orri Arnarsson (against Spain)
- (Lithuania) Tomas Jonyla (against Sweden)
- (Romania) Costyn Gheorghe (against Denmark)
- (San Marino) Gabriele Montali (against Denmark)
- (Slovenia) Blaž Kovač (against England)

2 own goals

- (Hungary) Bence Rab (against Switzerland & France)
