= Albania national under-19 football team =

National association football team

Albania Under-19
- Nickname(s): Kuqezinjtë (The Red and Blacks)
- Association: Federata Shqiptare e Futbollit (FSHF)
- Confederation: UEFA
- Head coach: Fatjon Tafaj
- Captain: Ernesto Bakiu
- Most caps: Ergis Arifi (19)
- Top scorer: Ernest Muçi (7)
- Home stadium: Elbasan Arena; Loro Boriçi Stadium
- FIFA code: ALB
First colours	Second colours	Third colours

First international
- Albania 1–8 Netherlands (Capbreton, France; 10 November 2001)

Biggest win
- Albania 7–1 Malta (Tirana, Albania; 28 March 2026)

Biggest defeat
- France 9–0 Albania (Moscow, Russia; 6 September 2002)

WAFF U-19 Championship
- Appearances: 1 (first in 2024)
- Best result: Group stage (2024)

The Albania national under-19 football team represents Albania in international football at this age level in the UEFA European Under-19 Championship and the FIFA U-20 World Cup, as well as any other under-19 international football tournaments. It is controlled by Albanian Football Association, the governing body for football in Albania.

== History ==
Before 2002, the event was classified as a U-18 tournament.

UEFA European Under-19 Championship record									UEFA European Under-19 Championship qualification record						Manager(s)
Year	Round	Position	Pld	W	D *	L	GF	GA	Pld	W	D	L	GF	GA	Manager(s)
(Norway) 2002	did not qualify								3	0	1	2	2	14	Petrit Haxhia
(Liechtenstein) 2003	did not qualify								3	0	0	3	1	16	Haxhia
(Switzerland) 2004	did not qualify								3	0	1	2	1	3	Haxhia
(Northern Ireland) 2005	did not qualify								6	2	1	3	7	14	Haxhia
(Poland) 2006	did not qualify								3	0	0	3	2	8	Haxhia
(Austria) 2007	did not qualify								3	2	0	1	5	4	Ramadan Shehu
(Czech Republic) 2008	did not qualify								6	1	2	3	4	9	Shehu
(Ukraine) 2009	did not qualify								3	0	0	3	1	10	Shehu
(France) 2010	did not qualify								3	1	0	2	4	8	Nevil Dede
(Romania) 2011	did not qualify								3	0	1	2	1	8	Shehu
(Estonia) 2012	did not qualify								3	1	1	1	4	1	Skënder Gega
(Lithuania) 2013	did not qualify								3	1	0	2	3	6	Foto Strakosha
(Hungary) 2014	did not qualify								3	0	2	1	2	3	Strakosha
(Greece) 2015	did not qualify								3	0	0	3	2	7	Altin Lala
(Germany) 2016	did not qualify								3	1	0	2	3	8	Arjan Bellaj
(Georgia (country)) 2017	did not qualify								3	1	0	2	3	4	Bellaj
(Finland) 2018	did not qualify								3	0	0	3	1	9	Erjon Bogdani
(Armenia) 2019	did not qualify								3	0	0	3	0	5	Bogdani
(Northern Ireland) ~~2020~~	Tournament was cancelled								3	0	0	3	4	11	Dede
(Romania) ~~2021~~	Tournament was cancelled								Tournament was cancelled						Armando Cungu
(Slovakia) 2022	did not qualify								3	1	1	1	5	7	Cungu
(Malta) 2023	did not qualify								2	0	0	2	1	8	Cungu
(Northern Ireland) 2024	did not qualify								3	0	0	3	1	6	Ervin Bulku
(Romania) 2025	did not qualify								3	0	0	3	0	8	Julian Ahmataj
(Wales) 2026	did not qualify								3	0	1	2	0	4	Ahmataj
(Czech Republic) 2027	To be determined								5	3	1	1	18	5	Fatjon Tafaj
(Bulgaria) 2028	To be determined								To be determined						
(Netherlands) 2029	To be determined								To be determined						
Total									79	14	12	54	75	182	

WAFF U-19 Championship
Year	Result	Pld	W	D	L	GF	GA
(Saudi Arabia) 2024	Group stages	3	1	1	1	3	4
Total	Gropstage	3	1	1	1	3	4

== Recent results ==
12 November 2025 2026 UEFA Q	Ukraine	3–0	Albania	Durrës
	Redushko 34'; Popov 74'; Kamenskyi 88'	Report		Stadium: Niko Dovana Stadium; Referee: Joakim Östling (Sweden)

15 November 2025 2026 UEFA Q	Slovakia	0–0	Albania	Durrës
		Report		Stadium: Niko Dovana Stadium; Referee: Joakim Östling (Sweden)

18 November 2025 2026 UEFA Q	Albania	0–1	Montenegro	Durrës
		Report	Jovanović 78'	Stadium: Niko Dovana Stadium; Referee: Matthias Jöllenbeck (Germany)

25 March 2026 2027 UEFA Q	Luxembourg	2–1	Albania	Tirana
	Kadamani 29' da Silva 36'	Report	A. Durmishi 45'	Stadium: Shtëpia e Futbollit; Referee: Wojciech Myc (Poland)

28 March 2026 2027 UEFA Q	Albania	7–1	Malta	Tirana
	A. Durmishi 21', 41', 49'; Kulla 35', 72', 80'; Rexhepi 56'	Report	Camilleri 26'	Stadium: Shtëpia e Futbollit; Referee: Michele Beltrano (San Marino)

31 March 2026 2027 UEFA Q	Albania	2–2	Norway	Tirana
	Kulla 52', 90+2'	Report	Solberg 36'; Gosik 41'	Stadium: Shtëpia e Futbollit; Referee: Wojciech Myc (Poland)

4 June 2026 Friendly	Bulgaria	1–0	Albania	Sofia
	Deykov 71'	Report		Stadium: National Football Base Boyana

7 June 2026 Friendly	Bulgaria	3–0	Albania	Sofia
	Boychev 27'; Tsonov 44' (pen.); Bozhkov 62'	Report		Stadium: National Football Base Boyana

30 September 2026 Friendly	Albania	3–2	Lithuania	Vorë
	Blini 18'; Žiedelis 90' (o.g.); Muslika 90+6' (pen.)	Report	Gudaitis 66'; Mališanović 87'	Stadium: Vora Stadium

2 October 2026 Friendly	Albania	2–1	Lithuania	Vorë
	Himallari 59', 66'	Report	Mališanović 31'	Stadium: Vora Stadium

11 November 2026 2027 UEFA Q	Albania	4–0	Cyprus	Sotira
	Kulla 23'; Muslika 48', 66'; Himallari 80'	Report		Stadium: Sotira Municipal Stadium; Referee: Michele Beltrano (San Marino)

14 November 2026 2027 UEFA Q	Armenia	0–4	Albania	Sotira
		Report	Muslika 4'; Kulla 45+3', 74'; Vukaj 61'	Stadium: Sotira Municipal Stadium; Referee: Jacob Karlsen (Denmark)

== Players ==
=== Current squad ===
- **The following players were called up for the 2027 Euro qualifying matches.**
- Match dates: 11 – 14 November 2026
- Opposition: Cyprus Armenia
- Caps and goals correct as of: 14 November 2026, after the match against Armenia.
- Players in **bold** have been called up or have played at least one full international match with national senior team.

No.	Pos.	Player	Date of birth (age)	Caps	Goals	Club
	GK	Raffaele Huli	30 July 2008 (age 18)	11	0	(Italian Football Federation) Juventus U20
	GK	Klevi Hasaj	28 September 2008 (age 18)	1	0	(Albanian Football Federation) Iliria
	GK	Simon Lleshi	27 April 2009 (age 17)	0	0	(Italian Football Federation) Inter U20
	DF	Leon Sylejmani	30 May 2008 (age 18)	16	0	(Swiss Football Association) Servette U21
	DF	Lucas Çekrezi	5 March 2008 (age 18)	10	0	(Italian Football Federation) Imperia
	DF	Endrit Asani	29 September 2008 (age 18)	7	0	(Swiss Football Association) Lausanne II
	DF	Spasian Nasto	4 June 2008 (age 18)	5	0	(Albanian Football Federation) Kastrioti
	DF	Stiven Nikolli	9 October 2008 (age 18)	4	0	(Albanian Football Federation) Laçi
	DF	Dion Vata	25 February 2009 (age 17)	4	0	(Albanian Football Federation) Partizani
	DF	Afrim Gashi	11 January 2009 (age 17)	3	0	(German Football Association) Bayern U19
	MF	Serxho Vogli	21 March 2008 (age 18)	13	0	(Albanian Football Federation) Tirana
	MF	Oliver Blini	10 January 2008 (age 18)	11	1	(Italian Football Federation) Empoli U20
	MF	Andreas Llana	26 January 2008 (age 18)	10	0	(Hellenic Football Federation) Olympiacos U19
	MF	Klevi Ajazi	12 November 2008 (age 18)	5	0	(Albanian Football Federation) Laçi
	MF	Armend Muslika	8 March 2009 (age 17)	4	4	(The Football Association) Tottenham Hotspur U18
	MF	Flavio Shkëmbi	17 September 2008 (age 18)	0	0	(Albanian Football Federation) Skënderbeu
	FW	Gabriel Kulla	20 February 2008 (age 18)	12	9	(Italian Football Federation) Sassuolo U20
	FW	Alen Vukaj	22 January 2008 (age 18)	9	1	(Italian Football Federation) Inter U20
	FW	Grei Kuqi	18 November 2008 (age 17)	6	0	(Albanian Football Federation) Teuta
	FW	Elson Himallari	16 April 2009 (age 17)	4	3	(Albanian Football Federation) Partizani
	FW	Francesco Matjani	5 June 2009 (age 17)	3	0	(German Football Association) Union Berlin U19

=== Recent call-ups ===
Following are listed players called up in the previous 12 months that are still eligible to represent Under 19 team.

Pos.	Player	Date of birth (age)	Caps	Goals	Club	Latest call-up
GK	Daniel Çuli	24 October 2008 (age 18)	8	0	(Italy) Teramo	v. Bulgaria, 7 June 2026
GK	**Alain Taho**	30 April 2007 (age 19)	7	0	(Italy) Inter U20	v. Montenegro, 18 November 2025^{U21}
DF	Kris Gecaj	14 November 2008 (age 18)	9	0	(Italy) Genoa U20	v. Lithuania, 2 October 2026^{INJ}
DF	Ernesto Marqeshi	7 January 2008 (age 18)	1	0	(Albania) Burreli	v. Lithuania, 2 October 2026
DF	Enis Vrella	3 April 2008 (age 18)	2	0	(Sweden) Landskrona U19	v. Bulgaria, 7 June 2026
DF	Betim Hasanaj	13 August 2008 (age 18)	2	0	(Norway) Lillestrøm II	v. Bulgaria, 7 June 2026
DF	Frestim Gaxheri	6 September 2008 (age 18)	2	0	(Switzerland) Lausanne II	v. Bulgaria, 7 June 2026
DF	Albrejd Ndoj	10 October 2008 (age 18)	2	0	(Italy) Pontevalleceppi	v. Norway, 31 March 2026
DF	Fabjano Nuhaj	6 April 2008 (age 18)	3	0	(Greece) Olympiacos U19	v. Norway, 31 March 2026
DF	Uesli Arapi	8 January 2008 (age 18)	0	0	(Albania) Partizani U19	v. Norway, 31 March 2026
DF	**Samuele Sina**	14 February 2007 (age 19)	15	0	(Italy) Union Brescia	v. Montenegro, 18 November 2025^{21}
DF	Yoni El Malem Beshaj	1 July 2007 (age 19)	12	0	(Israel) Hapoel Acre	v. Montenegro, 18 November 2025
DF	Davide Avdullari	13 January 2007 (age 19)	10	0	(Italy) Mestre	v. Montenegro, 18 November 2025
DF	Ramiz Ndoj	13 February 2007 (age 19)	0	0	(Albania) Teuta U19	v. Montenegro, 18 November 2025
MF	Rikardo Sheji	5 March 2008 (age 18)	13	0	(Italy) Perugia U19	v. Lithuania, 2 October 2026^{INJ}
MF	Armir Boriçi	2 November 2008 (age 18)	5	0	(Albania) Elbasani	v. Lithuania, 2 October 2026^{INJ}
MF	Petro Marku	15 August 2009 (age 17)	2	0	(Albania) Bylisi	v. Lithuania, 2 October 2026
MF	Sergjo Huna	8 October 2008 (age 18)	2	0	(Albania) Teuta	v. Bulgaria, 7 June 2026
MF	Dijar Ferati	24 September 2008 (age 18)	3	0	(Portugal) Rio Ave U23	v. Norway, 31 March 2026
MF	Dajan Durmishi	25 June 2008 (age 18)	1	0	(Slovenia) Koper U19	v. Norway, 31 March 2026
MF	Ergis Arifi	11 January 2007 (age 19)	19	0	(Albania) Teuta	v. Montenegro, 18 November 2025^{U21}
MF	Mattia Huqi	21 June 2007 (age 19)	16	2	(Italy) Empoli U20	v. Montenegro, 18 November 2025^{U21}
MF	Matteo Dashi	22 January 2007 (age 19)	6	1	(England) Reading U21	v. Montenegro, 18 November 2025
FW	Sokol Uldedaj	6 February 2009 (age 17)	1	0	(Albania) Vllaznia	v. Lithuania, 2 October 2026
FW	Emiljano Mihana	18 March 2008 (age 18)	2	0	(Albania) Vora	v. Bulgaria, 7 June 2026
FW	Kevin Gjoka	23 April 2008 (age 18)	2	0	(Italy) Catanzaro U19	v. Bulgaria, 7 June 2026
FW	Arman Durmishi	25 June 2008 (age 18)	6	4	(Italy) Juventus U23	v. Norway, 31 March 2026
FW	Tedi Malaj	2 July 2007 (age 19)	13	3	(Albania) Partizani B	v. Montenegro, 18 November 2025
FW	Briajan Gjyla	26 July 2007 (age 19)	11	0	(Albania) Vora	v. Montenegro, 18 November 2025

Notes

- ^{INJ} = The player is not part of the current squad due to injury.
- ^{U21} = Was called up from national under-21 squad.

=== Coaching staff ===
Current coaching staff:

Position	Name
Head coach	(Albania) Fatjon Tafaj
Assistant coach	(Albania) Agron Kërçova
Goalkeeping coach	(Albania) Elvis Kotorri
Team doctor	(Albania) Mehmet Buzmexhani
Physiotherapists	(Albania) Tedi Maqellari
Athletic preparator	(Albania) Ardit Gjikola
Video analyst	(Albania) Martin Lulgjuraj
Team manager	(Albania) Sajdi Gashi
Equipment manager	(Albania) Osman Bulku

== See also ==
- Albania men's national football team
- Albania men's national under-23 football team
- Albania men's national under-21 football team
- Albania men's national under-20 football team
- Albania men's national under-18 football team
- Albania men's national under-17 football team
- Albania men's national under-16 football team
- Albania men's national under-15 football team
- Albania women's national football team
- Albania women's national under-19 football team
- Albania women's national under-17 football team
- Albania national football team results
- Albania national youth football team
- Albanian Superliga
- Football in Albania
- List of Albania international footballers
