= Omar Natami =

Italian footballer

Personal information
- Date of birth: 15 December 1998 (age 27)
- Place of birth: Arezzo, Italy
- Position: Right winger

Team information
- Current team: UNA Strassen
- Number: 11

Youth career
- F91 Dudelange

Senior career*
Years	Team	Apps	(Gls)
2017–2021	F91 Dudelange	6	(1)
2017–2018	→ Mondorf (loan)	14	(6)
2018–2019	→ Jeunesse Esch (loan)	17	(2)
2020	→ Mondorf (loan)	3	(2)
2020–2021	→ UNA Strassen (loan)	24	(3)
2021–2022	Jammerbugt	28	(4)
2022	Jönköpings Södra	9	(0)
2023–2026	Progrès Niederkorn	73	(16)
2026–	UNA Strassen	6	(3)

International career^{‡}
2026–	Luxembourg	4	(0)
- * Club domestic league appearances and goals as of 20 September 2026 ‡ National team caps and goals as of 15 November 2026

Omar Natami (born 15 December 1998) is a professional footballer who plays as a right winger for UNA Strassen. Born in Italy, he represents the Luxembourg national team.

== International career ==
Natami made his debut for the Luxembourg national team on 29 September 2026 in a 2026–27 UEFA Nations League against Iceland at Stade de Luxembourg. He came on for Hamza Kadamani in the 76th minute in the 3–0 defeat.
