= David Weiss (footballer) =

Finnish footballer (born 2007)

Personal information
- Full name: David Tomasz Weiss
- Date of birth: 29 May 2007 (age 19)
- Place of birth: Finland
- Position: Midfielder

Team information
- Current team: Sassuolo U20
- Number: 5

Youth career
- TuPS
- –2023: PKKU
- 2023–2024: → Sassuolo (loan)
- 2024–: Sassuolo

Senior career*
| Years | Team | Apps | (Gls) |
| 2022–2024 | PKKU | 6 | (0) |

International career^{‡}
| 2022 | Finland U15 | 3 | (0) |
| 2022–2023 | Finland U16 | 9 | (1) |
| 2023– | Finland U17 | 9 | (0) |
| 2024–2025 | Finland U18 | 7 | (0) |
| 2025– | Finland U19 | 1 | (0) |
- * Club domestic league appearances and goals as of 28 November 2023 ‡ National team caps and goals as of 6 September 2025

David Tomasz Weiss (born 29 May 2007) is a Finnish professional footballer who plays as a midfielder for the under-20 team (Campionato Primavera 1) of Serie A club Sassuolo. Born and raised in Finland, Weiss is of Polish descent.

== Early years ==
Weiss was born in Finland to Polish parents from Gdańsk, who had moved to Finland to work in the early 2000s.

Weiss started to play football in youth teams of TuPS and PK Keski-Uusimaa in Tuusula.

== Career ==
On 23 July 2022, Weiss made his senior debut with the PK Keski-Uusimaa first team, in the third-tier Kakkonen at the age of 15, playing the second half in a 4–4 home draw against Reipas Lahti. In the first half of the 2023 Kakkonen season, he made five more appearances for his team.

On 2 September 2023, it was announced that Weiss was loaned out to Italian club Sassuolo on a one-year loan deal. He was registered to the club's U17 academy squad. After the season, his transfer was made permanent and he was promoted to the U18 team.

== International career ==
Weiss is a regular Finnish youth international, having represented the country at under-15, under-16 and under-17 youth national team levels.

Weiss was part of the Finland U16 squad that won the friendly tournament Baltic Cup in July 2023.

On 4 October 2023, he was named in the Finland U17 squad in the 2024 UEFA European Under-17 Championship qualification tournament. In the tournament Finland drew with Ukraine and Germany, 2–2 and 1–1 respectively, before winning Liechtenstein 3–0, placing 2nd in the group and advancing to the Elite round.

== Career statistics ==
As of 18 August 2024.

Appearances and goals by club, season and competition
| Club | Season | League | | | Cup | | League cup | | Europe | | Total | |
| Club | Season | Division | Apps | Goals | Apps | Goals | Apps | Goals | Apps | Goals | Apps | Goals |
|---|---|---|---|---|---|---|---|---|---|---|---|---|
| PK Keski-Uusimaa | 2022 | Kakkonen | 1 | 0 | – | | – | | – | | 1 | 0 |
| PK Keski-Uusimaa | 2023 | Kakkonen | 5 | 0 | 0 | 0 | – | | – | | 5 | 0 |
| PK Keski-Uusimaa | Total | | 6 | 0 | 0 | 0 | 0 | 0 | 0 | 0 | 6 | 0 |
| Career total | | | 6 | 0 | 0 | 0 | 0 | 0 | 0 | 0 | 6 | 0 |
