= Jean-Baptiste Bosey =

French footballer (born 2008)

Personal information
- Date of birth: 15 February 2008 (age 18)
- Place of birth: Paris, France
- Position: Forward

Team information
- Current team: Strasbourg
- Number: 38

Youth career
- 2017–2022: AS Pierrefitte
- 2022–2023: JA Drancy
- 2023–2025: Strasbourg

Senior career*
Years	Team	Apps	(Gls)
2025–	Strasbourg B	13	(4)
2025–	Strasbourg	1	(0)

International career^{‡}
2026–	France U19	3	(1)
- * Club domestic league appearances and goals as of 16 May 2026 ‡ National team caps and goals as of 16 May 2026

Jean-Baptiste Bosey (born 15 February 2008) is a French professional footballer who plays as a forward for Ligue 1 club Strasbourg.

== Club career ==
Born in Paris, Bosey is a youth product of the club of Pierrefitte, JA Drancy and Strasbourg.

During the 2025–26 season, whilst having become a regular goalscorer with the under-19 and the National 3 reserve, he started regularly featuring on the bench in the Ligue 1 and Conference League.

In March 2026, he signed his first professional contract with Strasbourg.

Bosey made his professional debut with Strasbourg in a 1–1 Ligue 1 draw with Angers on 10 May 2026, replacing Lucas Høgsberg in the added time.

== International career ==
Born in France, Bosey has Democratic Republic of the Congo origins. He is a youth international for France, having played for the under-19, helping them reach the Round 2 League A of the 2027 Euro qualifying.
