= Alexis Ciria =

Spanish footballer (born 2008)

Personal information
- Full name: Alexis Ciria Flores
- Date of birth: 4 January 2008 (age 18)
- Place of birth: Badajoz, Spain
- Position: Winger

Team information
- Current team: Real Madrid B
- Number: 17

Youth career
- 2015–2019: Flecha Negra
- 2019–2022: Sevilla
- 2022–2023: Altair
- 2023–2026: Sevilla
- 2026: Real Madrid

Senior career*
Years	Team	Apps	(Gls)
2024–2026	Sevilla B	24	(0)
2026	Real Madrid C	6	(1)
2026–	Real Madrid B	9	(3)

International career^{‡}
2024	Spain U16	2	(1)
2024–2025	Spain U17	13	(4)
2025–2026	Spain U18	6	(3)
- * Club domestic league appearances and goals as of 03:14, 26 July 2026 (UTC) ‡ National team caps and goals as of 03:14, 26 July 2026 (UTC)

Alexis Ciria Flores (born 4 January 2008) is a Spanish footballer who plays as a winger for Real Madrid Castilla.

== Club career ==
Ciria began his youth career in his hometown club, Flecha Negra, where he played for four years before joining Sevilla in 2019. There, he established himself as one of the academy's most promising talents. During his time at the club, Ciria played in 24 games for Sevilla Atlético.

=== Real Madrid ===
On 26 January 2026, Ciria's transfer to Real Madrid was made official. During his first season, Ciria helped the Juvenil A team win the league, the UEFA Youth League, and the Copa de Campeones, playing a key role in all three competitions. He also featured for Real Madrid C and Real Madrid Castilla, establishing himself as an important player for both teams.

On August 1 2026, Ciria played for the Real Madrid first team in a 2-2 draw against Fiorentina in Austria for a pre-season friendly. During his debut, he was able to score a goal against Fiorentina in the 23rd minute of the match, which brought Real Madrid 2-0 up. However, Fiorentina scored 2 to tie the game.

== International career ==
Ciria is a Spanish youth international for the U15, U16, U17, and U18 teams. In March 2026, Ciria was selected for Round 1 of the 2027 UEFA European Under-19 Championship qualification.

== Style of play ==
Ciria plays as a winger. He is known for his dribbling and ability to unbalance opponents.

== Career statistics ==
=== Club ===
As of 25 July 2026

Appearances and goals by club, season and competition
Club	Season	League			Other		Total	
Club	Season	Division	Apps	Goals	Apps	Goals	Apps	Goals
Sevilla Atlético	2023–24	Segunda Federación	1	0	—		1	0
Sevilla Atlético	2024–25	Primera Federación	14	0	—		14	0
Sevilla Atlético	2025–26	Primera Federación	9	0	—		9	0
Sevilla Atlético	Total		24	0	0	0	24	0
Real Madrid C	2025–26	Segunda Federación	6	1	2 (Note: Appearances in 2026 Segunda Federación play-offs)	0	8	1
Real Madrid Castilla	2025–26	Primera Federación	9	3	2 (Note: Appearances in 2026 Primera Federación play-offs)	0	11	3
Career total			39	4	4	0	43	4
