= Gabriel Kulla =

Albanian footballer

Personal information
- Date of birth: February 20, 2008 (age 18)
- Place of birth: Shkodër, Albania
- Position: Striker

Team information
- Current team: Sassuolo
- Number: 14

Youth career
- 2017–2019: Djelmnia Shkodrane
- 2023–2024: Sasso Marconi
- 2024–: Sassuolo

Senior career*
Years	Team	Apps	(Gls)
2023–2024	Sasso Marconi	1	(1)
2026–	Sassuolo	2	(0)

International career^{‡}
2024–2025	Albania U17	8	(3)
2025–	Albania U19	11	(8)
2025–	Albania U21	1	(0)
- * Club domestic league appearances and goals as of 2 November 2026 ‡ National team caps and goals as of 14 November 2026

Gabriel Kulla (born 20 February 2008) is an Albanian professional footballer who plays as a striker for Serie A club Sassuolo and the Albania under-19 national team.

After beginning his career in Albania, he made his senior debut with Sasso Marconi at the age of 15 before joining Sassuolo's academy in 2024, where he emerged as a prolific scorer for the club's Primavera side and made his Serie A debut in 2026.

At international level, he has represented Albania at under-17, under-19 and under-21 levels, becoming the leading scorer in the 2027 UEFA European Under-19 Championship qualification as Albania secured promotion to League A.

== Club career ==
Kulla began playing football in 2017 at the age of nine with local club Djelmnia Shkodrane in Shkodër, where he spent two years.

In 2023, he joined Sasso Marconi, initially training with the club's youth team before being promoted to the first team in Eccellenza. He made his senior debut on 12 November 2023, aged 15 years and 264 days, scoring the winning goal in a 1–0 victory, and helped the club earn promotion to Serie D at the end of the season.

In 2024, Kulla joined Sassuolo's academy, progressing through its youth teams before featuring for the club's Primavera side in the 2025–26 Campionato Primavera 1, where he recorded 16 goals and eight assists in 37 appearances and was named the league's best striker at the Primavera Best Awards.

Kulla made his Serie A debut on 23 August 2026, coming on as a late substitute in a 2–1 defeat to Atalanta.

== International career ==
Kulla represented Albania at under-17, under-19 and under-21 levels from 2024 onwards, making his under-21 debut in a friendly against Ukraine in October 2026.

During the 2027 UEFA European Under-19 Championship qualification, Kulla scored a hat-trick in a 7–1 win over Malta and twice in a 2–2 draw against Norway in the first round in League B, before adding three goals in the second round to help Albania finish top of its group and secure promotion to League A; with eight goals in five appearances, he is currently the competition's leading scorer.

== Career statistics ==
As of match played 2 November 2026

Appearances and goals by club, season and competition
Club	Season	League			National cup (Note: Includes Coppa Italia)		Continental		Other		Total	
Club	Season	Division	Apps	Goals	Apps	Goals	Apps	Goals	Apps	Goals	Apps	Goals
Sassuolo	2026–27	Serie A	2	0	—		—		—		2	0
Career total			2	0	—		—		—		2	0
