= US Sassuolo Calcio Youth Sector =

Italian football club

Sassuolo Youth Sector
- Full name: Unione Sportiva Sassuolo Calcio Youth Sector
- Nicknames: "Neroverdi" (The Black and Greens)
- Ground: Stadio Enzo Ricci – Sassuolo, Italy
- Head coach: Cristian Serpini
- League: Campionato Primavera 1
- Website: http://www.sassuolocalcio.it/articles/?id=32&aid=11/rosa-primavera
Home colours	Away colours	Third colours

U.S. Sassuolo Calcio Youth Sector (Italian: Settore Giovanile) comprises the under-19 team and the academy of Italian professional football club U.S. Sassuolo Calcio. The under-19 squad competes in the Campionato Primavera 1.

== Primavera ==
=== Current squad ===
As of 8 July 2026

Note: Flags indicate national team as defined under FIFA eligibility rules; some limited exceptions apply. Players may hold more than one non-FIFA nationality.

No.	Pos.	Nation	Player
2	DF	SMR	Giacomo Benvenuti
3	DF	ITA	Cristian Costabile
4	DF	ITA	Tommaso Macchioni
5	MF	FIN	David Weiss
6	DF	ITA	Giorgio Vezzosi
7	MF	ITA	Alessandro Cardascio
8	MF	ITA	Giacomo Seminari
9	FW	ROU	Denis Șandro
10	MF	ITA	Christian Frangella
11	FW	ITA	Gabriele Negri
12	GK	ROU	Luca Lungu
14	FW	ALB	Gabriel Kulla
17	MF	ITA	Catello Amendola
19	DF	ITA	Andrea Campani
21	MF	ITA	Giuseppe Brugnoli
23	MF	ROU	Troy Tomșa
26	DF	ITA	Alessio Sibilano

No.	Pos.	Nation	Player
28	DF	ITA	Christian Petito
44	MF	ITA	Andrea Mussini
45	DF	ITA	Lorenzo Appiah
76	DF	ITA	Luca Barani
80	GK	ITA	Lorenzo Nyarko
92	MF	ITA	Cristian Acatullo
97	FW	ITA	Omar Barry
98	FW	ITA	Diego Tampieri
99	FW	ITA	Giovanni Chiricallo
—	DF	ITA	Francesco Bolondi
—	DF	ITA	Mattia Mirri
—	MF	PER	Nicolás Cairo
—	MF	ROU	Rareș Coman
—	MF	MDA	Iustin Cornescu
—	FW	ROU	Mario David
—	FW	GHA	Francis Wiredu

== Notable former Primavera and youth team players ==
The following is a list of players coming from Sassuolo Primavera team, that had a continuous career aftermath.

- (Italy) Claud Adjapong
- (Italy) Domenico Berardi
- (Italy) Leonardo Fontanesi
- (Italy) Davide Frattesi
- (Italy) Nicholas Pierini
- (Italy) Giacomo Raspadori
- (Italy) Gianluca Scamacca
- (Netherlands) Ryan Flamingo
- (Niger) Salim Abubakar
