= Salim Abubakar =

Nigerien footballer

Personal information
- Date of birth: 6 April 2003 (age 23)
- Place of birth: Accra, Ghana
- Height: 1.85 m (6 ft 1 in)
- Position: Midfielder

Team information
- Current team: Skënderbeu

Youth career
- EurAfrica
- 2019–2021: Sassuolo

Senior career*
Years	Team	Apps	(Gls)
2021–2025	Sassuolo	0	(0)
2024–2025	→ Pergolettese (loan)	18	(0)
2025–	Skënderbeu	30	(1)

International career^{‡}
2023–	Niger U23	1	(0)
2023–	Niger	5	(0)
- * Club domestic league appearances and goals as of 25 April 2025 ‡ National team caps and goals as of 8 January 2024

Salim Abubakar (born 6 April 2003) is a professional footballer who plays as a midfielder for Albanian club Skënderbeu. Born in Ghana, he plays for the Niger national team.

== Career ==
Abubakar arrived in Italy in 2019 during the COVID-19 pandemic where he joined the youth academy of Sassuolo. On 1 September 2021, he extended his professional contract with Sassuolo until 2026. He made 4 appearances on the bench for the senior team in 2022.

On 30 August 2024, Abubakar was loaned to Pergolettese in Serie C.

In July 2025, Abubakar moved to Skënderbeu in Albania.

== International career ==
Born in Ghana, Abubakar is of Nigerien descent. He was called up to the Niger U23s for the 2023 U-23 Africa Cup of Nations, making one appearance. In September 2023, he was called up to the senior Niger national team for 2023 Africa Cup of Nations qualification matches. He debuted in a 2–0 loss to Uganda on 7 September 2023.
