= Romania national under-19 football team =

National association football team

Romania U-19
- Nickname: Tricolorii (The Tricolours)
- Association: Federația Română de Fotbal
- Confederation: UEFA (Europe)
- Head coach: Marin Ion
- Captain: Davide Moisa
- Top scorer: Alexandru Mățan (8)
- FIFA code: ROU
First colours	Second colours	Third colours

European Under-19 Championship
- Appearances: 3 (first in 2011)
- Best result: Semi-finals (2025)

The Romania national under-19 football team represents Federația Română de Fotbal, the governing body for football in Romania, in international football at this age level.

== Honours ==
- UEFA European Under-19 Football Championship
  - Under-19 era, 2002–present

Champions (0):
Runner-up (0):

  - Under-18 era, 1957–2001

Champions (1): 1962
Runner-up (1): 1960

== Results and fixtures ==
14 November 2025	Romania	1–2	Cyprus	Central Stadium of the Romanian National Football Centre, Buftea
12:00	Tomșa 35' (pen.)	Report	Chrysis 52'; Andreas 86'

15 November 2025	Romania	1–1	Finland	Anghel Iordănescu Stadium, Voluntari
15:00	Gașpăr 22'	Report	Vikström 73'	Attendance: 96; Referee: Menelaos Antoniou (Cyprus)

18 November 2025	Iceland	0–3	Romania	Concordia, Chiajna
15:00		Report	Tomșa 18'; Stoian 34'; Toma 64'	Attendance: 85; Referee: Simon Bourdeaud'hui (Belgium)

25 March 2026	Kazakhstan	2–0	Romania	Anghel Iordănescu Stadium, Voluntari
16:00	Toleukhan 13'; Tuyakbayev 66'	Report		Referee: Philip Farrugia (Malta)

28 March 2026	Romania	0–0	Northern Ireland	Concordia Stadium, Chiajna
15:30		Report		Referee: Lukasz Kuzma (Poland)

31 March 2026	Romania	1–1	Ukraine	Anghel Iordănescu Stadium, Voluntari
16:00	Toma 26'	Report	Kamenskyi 85'	Referee: Joey Kooij (The Netherlands)

24 September 2026	Romania	1–2	Hungary	TSC Arena, Bačka Topola
17:00	Bota 8'	Report	Gólik 15'; Galambos 90+1'

26 September 2026	Serbia	1–3	Romania	Stadion Milan Sredanović, Kula
17:00	Damjanović 83'	Report	Batzula 22'; Roateș 63'; Bota 87'

29 September 2026	Bulgaria	0–1	Romania	Gradski stadion, Senta
15:30		Report	Batzula 90+1'

11 November 2026	Italy	2–0	Romania	Stadio del Conero, Ancona
16:30	Borasio 49', 76'	Report		Attendance: 572; Referee: Florian Lata (Albania)

14 November 2026	Israel	2–1	Romania	Stadio Bruno Recchioni, Fermo
13:00	Luski 85'; Yossef 90+3'	Report	Bota 21' (pen.)	Attendance: 84; Referee: Tom Owen (Wales)

17 November 2026	Romania	1–0	Ukraine	Stadio del Conero, Ancona
14:00	Pellegrini 87'	Report		Referee: Mathieu Vernice (France)

== Players ==
=== Current squad ===
The following players were called up for simultaneous 2026 UEFA European Under-19 Championship qualification elite round and 2027 UEFA European Under-19 Championship qualification first round fixtures to be played 25 – 31 March 2026.

- 2026 UEFA European Under-19 Championship qualification opponents: Kazakhstan, Northern Ireland, Ukraine.
- 2027 UEFA European Under-19 Championship qualification opponents: Andorra, Liechtenstein, Denmark.

No.	Pos.	Player	Date of birth (age)	Club
	GK	Bogdan Ungureanu	1 April 2007 (age 19)	(Romanian Football Federation) Sepsi
	GK	Matei Popa	29 April 2007 (age 19)	(Romanian Football Federation) FCSB
	GK	Mihai Răcășan	1 July 2007 (age 19)	(Romanian Football Federation) Slatina
	GK	Răzvan Farcaș	22 May 2008 (age 18)	(Royal Spanish Football Federation) Leganés
	GK	Luca Crăciun	25 August 2008 (age 18)	(Romanian Football Federation) Argeș Pitești
	DF	Alex Urcan	19 March 2007 (age 19)	(Royal Spanish Football Federation) Gimnàstic Manresa
	DF	Fabio Bădărău	18 September 2008 (age 18)	(Italian Football Federation) Sampdoria
	DF	Rareș Fotin	9 September 2007 (age 19)	(Romanian Football Federation) Farul Constanța
	DF	Davide Moisa	4 February 2008 (age 18)	(Italian Football Federation) Hellas Verona
	DF	Bogdan Ungureanu	12 June 2008 (age 18)	(Royal Spanish Football Federation) Atlético Madrid
	DF	Matei Ceuca	25 August 2008 (age 18)	(Italian Football Federation) Torino
	DF	Christian Vechiu	3 March 2008 (age 18)	(Italian Football Federation) AC Milan
	DF	Eduard Cotor	28 January 2007 (age 19)	(German Football Association) SV Meppen
	DF	Alin Techereș	5 January 2007 (age 19)	(Romanian Football Federation) Sepsi
	DF	Ștefan Senciuc	2 April 2007 (age 19)	(Romanian Football Federation) ASA Târgu Mureș
	DF	Florin Gașpăr	25 September 2007 (age 19)	(Romanian Football Federation) CSM Reșița
	DF	Costyn Gheorghe	9 February 2008 (age 18)	(Romanian Football Federation) Farul Constanța
	DF	Raul Avram	30 December 2008 (age 17)	(Italian Football Federation) Lazio
	MF	Raul Vereș	14 July 2007 (age 19)	(Royal Spanish Football Federation) Las Rozas
	MF	Alexandru Bota (captain)	31 March 2008 (age 18)	(Romanian Football Federation) Botoșani
	MF	Sebastian Banu	10 January 2008 (age 18)	(Romanian Football Federation) Concordia Chiajna
	MF	Alin Gera	27 July 2007 (age 19)	(Royal Spanish Football Federation) Valencia
	MF	Ianis Podoleanu	3 January 2008 (age 18)	(Romanian Football Federation) Farul Constanța
	MF	Rareș Coman	28 January 2008 (age 18)	(Italian Football Federation) Sassuolo
	MF	Ștefan Amarandei	31 May 2008 (age 18)	(Italian Football Federation) Sampdoria
	MF	Mihai Toma	17 February 2007 (age 19)	(Romanian Football Federation) FCSB
	MF	Efraim Bödő	1 February 2007 (age 19)	(Romanian Football Federation) Csíkszereda Miercurea Ciuc
	MF	Ianis Doană	12 October 2007 (age 19)	(Romanian Football Federation) Steaua București
	MF	Denis Țăroi	6 April 2008 (age 18)	(Romanian Football Federation) UTA Arad
	MF	Hunor Batzula	22 January 2008 (age 18)	(Romanian Football Federation) Sepsi
	MF	Robert Drăghici	21 June 2008 (age 18)	(German Football Association) Augsburg
	FW	Yanis Pîrvu	2 April 2007 (age 19)	(Romanian Football Federation) Argeș Pitești
	FW	Robert Petculescu	12 February 2007 (age 19)	(Romanian Football Federation) FC Voluntari
	FW	Iustin Doicaru	7 February 2007 (age 19)	(Romanian Football Federation) Farul Constanța
	FW	Robert Necșulescu	17 May 2007 (age 19)	(Romanian Football Federation) Chindia Târgoviște
	FW	Mihai Boșneag	12 January 2007 (age 19)	(German Football Association) Augsburg
	FW	Alexandru Stoian	15 December 2007 (age 18)	(Romanian Football Federation) FCSB
	FW	Andrei Roateș	14 April 2008 (age 18)	(Royal Spanish Football Federation) Levante
	FW	Mario David	2 January 2008 (age 18)	(Italian Football Federation) Sassuolo
	FW	Fernando Pellegrini	27 February 2008 (age 18)	(Italian Football Federation) Genoa

=== Recent call-ups ===
The following players have been called up to the squad within the last twelve months and remain eligible for selection.

Pos.	Player	Date of birth (age)	Caps	Goals	Club	Latest call-up

== Coaching staff ==
Role	Name
Head coach	(Romania) Marin Ion
Assistant coach	(Romania) Vlad Chiricheș
Goalkeeping coach	(Romania) Marian Ioniță
Fitness coach	(Romania) Robert Panduru
Video Analyst	(Romania) Vlăduț Lakatoș
Doctor	(Romania) Darius Mihart
Physioterapists	(Moldova) Dumitru Bzovîi (Romania) Răzvan Mohorîta
Masseur	(Romania) Adrian Rus
Kit man	(Romania) Nicușor Burcină

== See also ==
- Romania men's national football team
- Romania men's national under-21 football team
- Romania men's national under-20 football team
- Romania men's national under-17 football team
- Romania women's national football team
- Romania women's national under-19 football team
- Romania women's national under-17 football team
- European Under-19 Football Championship
