= Hunor Batzula =

Romanian footballer

Personal information
- Full name: Hunor Szabolcs Batzula
- Date of birth: 22 January 2008 (age 18)
- Place of birth: Sfântu Gheorghe, Romania
- Height: 1.77 m (5 ft 10 in)
- Position: Midfielder

Team information
- Current team: Sepsi OSK
- Number: 23

Youth career
- –2025: Sepsi OSK

Senior career*
Years	Team	Apps	(Gls)
2024–	Sepsi OSK	42	(1)

International career^{‡}
2025–2026	Romania U18	5	(0)
2026–	Romania U19	9	(4)
- * Club domestic league appearances and goals as of 8 November 2026 ‡ National team caps and goals as of 17 November 2026

Hunor Szabolcs Batzula (born 22 January 2008) is a Romanian professional footballer who plays as a midfielder for Liga I club Sepsi OSK.

== Club career ==
At just 16 years old, Batzula made his Liga I debut for Sepsi OSK on 3 May 2024, in a 4–1 away win against Farul Constanța.

== Personal life ==
Born in Sfântu Gheorghe, Batzula is of Hungarian ethnicity.

== Career statistics ==
=== Club ===
As of match played 8 November 2026

Appearances and goals by club, season and competition
Club	Season	League			Cupa României		Europe		Other		Total	
Club	Season	Division	Apps	Goals	Apps	Goals	Apps	Goals	Apps	Goals	Apps	Goals
Sepsi OSK	2023–24	Liga I	1	0	—		—		—		1	0
Sepsi OSK	2024–25	Liga I	1	0	2	0	—		—		3	0
Sepsi OSK	2025–26	Liga II	26	0	3	0	—		—		29	0
Sepsi OSK	2026–27	Liga I	14	1	3	0	—		—		17	1
Career total			42	1	8	0	0	0	0	0	50	1
