= Rareș Coman =

Romanian footballer (born 2008)

Personal information
- Full name: Gabriel Valentino Rareș Coman
- Date of birth: 28 January 2008 (age 18)
- Place of birth: Romania
- Position: Midfielder

Team information
- Current team: Sassuolo U20

Youth career
- Dunărea Călărași
- 2024–: Sassuolo

Senior career*
Years	Team	Apps	(Gls)
2023–2024	Dunărea Călărași	0	(0)

International career^{‡}
2023–2024	Romania U16	6	(0)
2024–2025	Romania U17	5	(1)
2025–	Romania U18	5	(0)
2026–	Romania U19	3	(1)
- * Club domestic league appearances and goals ‡ National team caps and goals as of 31 March 2026

Gabriel Valentino Rareș Coman (born 28 January 2008) is a Romanian professional footballer who plays as a midfielder for the under-20 team (Campionato Primavera 1) of Serie A club Sassuolo.

== Club career ==
Coman started his career with Romanian side Dunărea Călărași. A Romanian news website wrote that he was "a key player for Dunărea in Liga III" while playing for the club.

Following his stint there, he joined the youth academy of Italian side Sassuolo in 2024, after receiving interest from English sides West Ham and Watford.

== International career ==
Coman is a Romania youth international. During November 2024 and March 2025, he played for the Romania national under-17 football team for 2025 UEFA European Under-19 Championship qualification.
