= Ali Aliyev =

Ali Aliyev may refer to:

- Ali Aliev (physicist) (born 1955), American and Uzbekistani physicist of Crimean Tatar descent.
- Ali Aliyev (boxer) (born 1983), Russian amateur boxer
- Ali Aliyev (footballer) (born 1980), Kazakh footballer
- Ali Aliev (wrestler) (1937–1995), Soviet wrestler
