= Axel Brönner =

Swedish footballer (born 2008)

Personal information
- Full name: Axel Vilhelm Lorens Brönner
- Date of birth: 4 April 2008 (age 18)
- Place of birth: Luxembourg City, Luxembourg
- Position: Central midfielder

Team information
- Current team: IFK Norrköping
- Number: 20

Youth career
- Red Star Merl
- Lindö FF
- 2018–2024: IFK Norrköping

Senior career*
Years	Team	Apps	(Gls)
2024–	IFK Norrköping	47	(1)
2024	→ IF Sylvia (loan)	7	(0)
2025	→ IF Sylvia (loan)	1	(0)

International career^{‡}
2023–2025	Sweden U17	25	(1)
2025–	Sweden U19	13	(4)
- * Club domestic league appearances and goals as of 11 November 2026 ‡ National team caps and goals as of 11 April 2026

Axel Vilhelm Lorens Brönner (born 4 April 2008) is a Swedish footballer who plays as a central midfielder for IFK Norrköping. A product of IFK Norrköping's academy, he has represented Sweden at youth international levels.

== Early life ==
Brönner was born in Luxembourg to Swedish parents and moved to Norrköping, Sweden, at the age of seven. He began his football career at Red Star Merl and after his move to Sweden he went to the local club Lindö FF, before joining the IFK Norrköping academy in 2018.

As a child, Brönner supported IFK Norrköping and served as a ball boy during matches. He has said it was a childhood dream to play for the club's first team.

== Club career ==
Brönner progressed through the youth ranks at IFK Norrköping, where he was noted for his composure, passing, and leadership as a central midfielder.

In June 2023, he signed an academy contract with the club, valid until 2026. In March 2025, Brönner signed his first professional contract with IFK Norrköping, a three-year deal.

He made his senior debut in the 2024–25 Svenska Cupen, first appearing as a substitute against Karlbergs BK and later starting in the quarter-final against BK Häcken.

== International career ==
Brönner has represented Sweden at the U15, U16, and U17 levels. In 2024, he took part in the Federation Cup in Spain with the U16 national team. In 2025, he captained the U17 team in international tournaments in Spain and Croatia.
