= Pepijn Reulen =

Dutch association football player (born 2008)

Personal information
- Date of birth: 1 June 2008 (age 18)
- Position: Forward

Team information
- Current team: NAC Breda
- Number: 26

Youth career
- 2017 –2025: NAC Breda

Senior career*
Years	Team	Apps	(Gls)
2025-	NAC Breda	16	(1)
- * Club domestic league appearances and goals as of 21 May 2026

Pepijn Reulen (born 1 June 2008) is a Dutch professional footballer who plays as a forward for Eredivisie club NAC Breda.

== Career ==
From Dussen, Reulen joined the NAC Breda football academy in 2017. He progressed through the youth system ant the club and signed his first professional contract in June 2025. That summer, he trained with the NAC Breda first team. During pre-season, he scored in several matches as a 17-year-old and caused club manager Carl Hoefkens to be complimentary about his attacking prowess. He subsequently made his Eredivisie debut away against Feyenoord on the opening weekend of the season on 9 August 2025, appearing as a second-half substitute for Cherrion Valerius.
