= Dani Fernández (footballer, born 2008) =

Spanish footballer

Personal information
- Full name: Daniel Fernández Melián
- Date of birth: 26 January 2008 (age 18)
- Place of birth: San Cristóbal de La Laguna, Spain
- Height: 1.78 m (5 ft 10 in)
- Position: Midfielder

Team information
- Current team: Tenerife
- Number: 29

Youth career
- Tenerife

Senior career*
Years	Team	Apps	(Gls)
2024–	Tenerife	25	(3)
2024–	Tenerife B	21	(2)

International career^{‡}
2023–2024	Spain U16	4	(0)
2024–2025	Spain U17	8	(0)
2025–2026	Spain U18	3	(0)
2026–	Spain U19	2	(1)
- * Club domestic league appearances and goals as of 23 May 2026 ‡ National team caps and goals as of 31 March 2026

Daniel "Dani" Fernández Melián (born 26 January 2008) is a Spanish footballer who plays as a midfielder for CD Tenerife.

== Club career ==
Born in San Cristóbal de La Laguna, Santa Cruz de Tenerife, Canary Islands, Fernández was a CD Tenerife youth graduate. In April 2024, he agreed to a professional contract with the club, after spending a period separated from the Cadete squad prior to the renewal.

Before even having appeared with the reserves, Fernández began training with the main squad in May 2024. After being an unused substitute in a 1–1 away draw against Burgos CF, he made his senior – and professional – debut on 2 June, replacing Enric Gallego in a 2–1 Segunda División home win over Real Valladolid; aged 16 years and 128 days, he became the second-youngest to debut with the club, only behind Víctor Correa in 1984.

Fernández scored his first professional goal on 5 October 2024, netting the opener in a 2–0 home win over FC Cartagena; aged 16 years and 249 days, he became the youngest goalscorer of the club's history.

== International career ==
On 18 October 2023, Fernández was called up to the Spain national under-16 team for two friendlies against Romania.
