= Alexandru Bota =

Romanian footballer (born 2008)

Personal information
- Full name: Alexandru Cristian Bota
- Date of birth: 31 March 2008 (age 18)
- Place of birth: Cluj-Napoca, România
- Height: 1.75 m (5 ft 9 in)
- Position: Midfielder

Team information
- Current team: Bihor Oradea (on loan from Universitatea Cluj)
- Number: 10

Youth career
- 2013–2026: Universitatea Cluj

Senior career*
Years	Team	Apps	(Gls)
2023–	Universitatea Cluj	10	(0)
2026	→ Botoșani (loan)	5	(0)
2026–	→ Bihor Oradea (loan)	11	(3)

International career^{‡}
2023	Romania U15	8	(2)
2023–2024	Romania U16	5	(1)
2024–2025	Romania U17	7	(1)
2025–2026	Romania U18	5	(1)
2026–	Romania U19	6	(3)
- * Club domestic league appearances and goals as of 31 October 2026 ‡ National team caps and goals as of 29 September 2026

Alexandru Cristian Bota (born 31 March 2008) is a Romanian professional footballer who plays as a midfielder for Liga II club Bihor Oradea, on loan from Liga I club Universitatea Cluj.

== Career statistics ==
As of 31 October 2026

Appearances and goals by club, season and competition
Club	Season	League			Cupa României		Europe		Other		Total	
Club	Season	Division	Apps	Goals	Apps	Goals	Apps	Goals	Apps	Goals	Apps	Goals
Universitatea Cluj	2022–23	Liga I	1	0	—		—		—		1	0
Universitatea Cluj	2024–25	Liga I	6	0	0	0	—		—		6	0
Universitatea Cluj	2025–26	Liga I	3	0	0	0	0	0	—		3	0
Universitatea Cluj	Total		10	0	0	0	0	0	—		10	0
Botoșani (loan)	2025–26	Liga I	5	0	0	0	—		0	0	5	0
Bihor Oradea (loan)	2026–27	Liga II	11	3	3	0	—		—		14	3
Career total			26	3	3	0	0	0	0	0	29	3

== Personal life ==
Bota's cousin, Olimpiu Moruțan, is also a football player, currently at Liga I club Rapid București and the Romania national team.
