= Arman Durmiši =

Albanian football player (born 2008)

Personal information
- Date of birth: 25 June 2008 (age 18)
- Place of birth: Koper, Slovenia
- Position: Forward

Team information
- Current team: Juventus Next Gen
- Number: 9

Youth career
- 2017–2024: Koper
- 2024–: Juventus

Senior career*
| Years | Team | Apps | (Gls) |
| 2024 | Koper | 4 | (0) |
| 2026– | Juventus Next Gen | 1 | (0) |

International career^{‡}
| 2022–2023 | Slovenia U15 | 10 | (3) |
| 2024 | Slovenia U16 | 4 | (1) |
| 2023–2024 | Slovenia U17 | 12 | (1) |
| 2024– | Albania U17 | 2 | (0) |
- * Club domestic league appearances and goals as of 23:45, 22 August 2026 (UTC) ‡ National team caps and goals as of 03:22, 13 March 2025 (UTC)

Arman Durmiši (Albanian: Arman Durmishi; born 25 June 2008) is a professional football player who plays as forward for Serie C Group B club Juventus Next Gen. Born in Slovenia, he is a youth international for Albania.

== Club career ==
Durmiši is a youth product of Slovenian club Koper since 2017. He scored 28 goals in the Slovenian U17 league and was top-scorer in the 2023–24 season. In the summer of 2024, he was promoted to Koper's senior team and signed a professional contract with the club. He debuted with Koper as a substitute in a 1–0 Slovenian PrvaLiga loss to Olimpija Ljubljana on 28 July 2024.

On 3 September 2024, he transferred to the youth academy of Italian club Juventus on a contract until 2027.

== International career ==
Born in Slovenia, Durmiši is of Albanian descent. He is a former youth international for Slovenia, having played up to the Slovenia U17s. In October 2024, he decided to represent Albania internationally and was called up to the Albania U17s. On 17 March 2025, he officially switched to the Albanian Football Federation.

== Personal life ==
Arman's twin brother, Dajan, is also a youth footballer, and played with him at the Juventus U17s.
