= Hamza Kadamani =

Luxembourgish footballer (born 2009)

Personal information
- Date of birth: 13 September 2009 (age 17)
- Place of birth: Syria
- Height: 1.87 m (6 ft 2 in)
- Position: Winger

Team information
- Current team: Metz
- Number: 38

Youth career
- –2021: Schifflange 95
- 2022: Swift Hesperange
- 2022–2023: Racing Union
- 2023: Schifflange 95
- 2024: Swift Hesperange
- 2025–: Metz

Senior career*
| Years | Team | Apps | (Gls) |
| 2026– | Metz B | 6 | (0) |
| 2026– | Metz | 0 | (0) |

International career^{‡}
| 2024–2025 | Luxembourg U16 | 7 | (2) |
| 2025 | Luxembourg U17 | 2 | (0) |
| 2025 | Luxembourg U18 | 2 | (1) |
| 2026– | Luxembourg U19 | 3 | (1) |
| 2026– | Luxembourg | 8 | (0) |
- * Club domestic league appearances and goals ‡ National team caps and goals as of 16 November 2026

Hamza Kadamani (born 13 September 2009) is a professional footballer who plays as a winger for French Ligue 2 club Metz. Born in Syria, he is a Luxembourg international.

== Early life ==
Kadamani was born on 13 September 2009. Born in Syria, he moved with his family to Luxembourg at the age of seven.

== Club career ==
As a youth player, Kadamani joined the youth academy of Luxembourgish side Schifflange 95. Following his stint there, he joined the youth academy of French side Metz in 2025 and was promoted to the club's reserve team one year later.

He signed his first professional contract with Metz on 23 July 2026, for a term of three years.

== International career ==
Kadamani is a Luxembourg youth international. During the spring of 2026, he played for the Luxembourg national under-19 football team for 2026 UEFA European Under-19 Championship qualification. He made his full senior debut on 3 June 2026 against Italy in a friendly.

== Style of play ==
Kadamani plays as a winger. Luxembourgish newspaper L'essentiel wrote in 2026 that "his best position is probably left wing, but he can also play on the right or as a supporting striker, a second striker".
