= 2026–27 UEFA Youth League league phase =

Youth football tournament

The 2026–27 UEFA Youth League UEFA Champions League Path (league phase) will begin on 8 September and will end on 9 December 2026. A total of 36 teams will compete in the league stage of the UEFA Champions League Path to decide 22 of the 36 places in the knockout phase of the 2026–27 UEFA Youth League.

== Format ==
Each team played six matches, three at home and three away, against six different opponents, with all 36 teams ranked in a single league table. The top 22 ranked teams qualified for the round of 32 of the knockout stage, where they were joined by ten winners of the Domestic Champions Path. Teams ranked from 23rd to 36th were eliminated from the competition.

=== Tiebreakers ===
Teams were ranked according to points (3 points for a win, 1 point for a draw, 0 points for a loss). If two or more teams were equal on points upon completion of the league phase, the following tiebreaking criteria were applied, in the order given, to determine their rankings:

1. Goal difference;
2. Goals scored;
3. Away goals scored;
4. Wins;
5. Away wins;
6. Higher number of points obtained collectively by league phase opponents;
7. Superior collective goal difference of league phase opponents;
8. Higher number of goals scored collectively by league phase opponents;
9. Lower disciplinary points total (direct red card = 3 points, yellow card = 1 point, expulsion for two yellow cards in one match = 3 points);
10. Drawing of lots.

During the league phase, criteria 1 to 5 were used to rank teams who have equal number of points. Should any teams be equal on points and tied on the first five criteria, they were considered equal in position and sorted alphabetically. Criteria 6 to 10 would only be used to break ties upon completion of all matches.

== Table ==
Pos	Team	Pld	W	D	L	GF	GA	GD	Pts	Qualification
1	(Spain) Real Madrid (A)	4	4	0	0	13	3	+10	12	Advance to knockout phase
2	(Netherlands) Feyenoord (A)	4	4	0	0	10	3	+7	12	Advance to knockout phase
3	(Czech Republic) Slavia Prague (A)	4	4	0	0	9	2	+7	12	Advance to knockout phase
4	(Spain) Villarreal	4	3	1	0	11	2	+9	10	Advance to knockout phase
5	(Spain) Atlético Madrid	4	3	1	0	13	5	+8	10	Advance to knockout phase
6	(Netherlands) PSV Eindhoven	4	3	0	1	11	6	+5	9	Advance to knockout phase
7	(Norway) Viking	4	3	0	1	8	5	+3	9	Advance to knockout phase
8	(Portugal) Porto	4	3	0	1	9	8	+1	9	Advance to knockout phase
9	(England) Liverpool	4	2	2	0	11	7	+4	8	Advance to knockout phase
10	(Germany) Borussia Dortmund	4	2	1	1	11	5	+6	7	Advance to knockout phase
11	(Italy) Roma	4	2	1	1	10	4	+6	7	Advance to knockout phase
12	(France) Paris Saint-Germain	4	2	1	1	9	5	+4	7	Advance to knockout phase
13	(Belgium) Club Brugge	4	2	1	1	12	9	+3	7	Advance to knockout phase
14	(Portugal) Sporting CP	4	2	1	1	9	7	+2	7	Advance to knockout phase
15	(France) Lille	4	2	1	1	7	5	+2	7	Advance to knockout phase
16	(France) Lens	4	2	0	2	8	9	−1	6	Advance to knockout phase
17	(Spain) Real Betis	4	1	2	1	8	6	+2	5	Advance to knockout phase
18	(Spain) Barcelona	4	1	2	1	6	6	0	5	Advance to knockout phase
19	(Greece) AEK Athens	4	1	2	1	4	6	−2	5	Advance to knockout phase
20	(Germany) VfB Stuttgart	4	1	1	2	9	7	+2	4	Advance to knockout phase
21	(England) Manchester United	4	1	1	2	7	6	+1	4	Advance to knockout phase
22	(Germany) Bayern Munich	4	1	1	2	10	10	0	4	Advance to knockout phase
23	(England) Arsenal	4	1	1	2	7	8	−1	4	
24	(Italy) Como	4	1	1	2	4	5	−1	4	
25	(England) Aston Villa	4	1	1	2	8	10	−2	4	
26	(Austria) LASK	4	1	1	2	5	7	−2	4	
27	(Italy) Inter Milan	4	1	1	2	4	7	−3	4	
28	(England) Manchester City	4	1	1	2	4	7	−3	4	
29	(Italy) Napoli	4	1	0	3	3	10	−7	3	
30	(Slovakia) Slovan Bratislava	4	1	0	3	3	13	−10	3	
31	(Norway) Bodø/Glimt	4	1	0	3	3	13	−10	3	
32	(Turkey) Galatasaray	4	0	2	2	5	8	−3	2	
33	(Germany) RB Leipzig	4	0	1	3	5	14	−9	1	
34	(Ukraine) Shakhtar Donetsk	4	0	0	4	2	8	−6	0	
35	(Turkey) Fenerbahçe	4	0	0	4	7	14	−7	0	
36	(Azerbaijan) Sabah	4	0	0	4	0	15	−15	0	

Updated to match(es) played on 4 November 2026. Source: UEFA
Rules for classification: League phase tiebreakers
(A) Advance to a further round

== Results summary ==
Matchday 1
Home team	Score	Away team
AEK Athens (Greece)	0–0	(Austria) LASK
Club Brugge (Belgium)	5–3	(England) Aston Villa
Borussia Dortmund (Germany)	2–3	(Spain) Villarreal
Porto (Portugal)	3–1	(England) Manchester City
Lille (France)	0–0	(Spain) Real Betis
Real Madrid (Spain)	3–0	(Italy) Inter Milan
VfB Stuttgart (Germany)	5–0	(Norway) Viking
Liverpool (England)	2–2	(Spain) Atlético Madrid
Paris Saint-Germain (France)	6–1	(Slovakia) Slovan Bratislava
Sporting CP (Portugal)	2–2	(Turkey) Galatasaray
Napoli (Italy)	1–2	(England) Arsenal
Barcelona (Spain)	1–2	(Netherlands) Feyenoord
Fenerbahçe (Turkey)	2–4	(Italy) Roma
PSV Eindhoven (Netherlands)	1–0	(Ukraine) Shakhtar Donetsk
Como (Italy)	1–1	(Germany) RB Leipzig
Bayern Munich (Germany)	6–1	(Norway) Bodø/Glimt
Manchester United (England)	5–0	(Azerbaijan) Sabah
Slavia Prague (Czech Republic)	2–1	(France) Lens

Matchday 2
Home team	Score	Away team
Lens (France)	3–2	(Portugal) Sporting CP
Sabah (Azerbaijan)	0–3	(Czech Republic) Slavia Prague
Arsenal (England)	2–3	(France) Lille
Atlético Madrid (Spain)	3–0	(England) Manchester United
Inter Milan (Italy)	1–1	(Belgium) Club Brugge
Galatasaray (Turkey)	0–1	(Spain) Barcelona
RB Leipzig (Germany)	1–6	(Netherlands) PSV Eindhoven
Viking (Norway)	2–0	(Germany) Bayern Munich
Villarreal (Spain)	5–0	(Italy) Napoli
Feyenoord (Netherlands)	1–0	(Italy) Como
LASK (Austria)	2–4	(England) Liverpool
Roma (Italy)	0–1	(Spain) Real Madrid
Aston Villa (England)	2–1	(Turkey) Fenerbahçe
Shakhtar Donetsk (Ukraine)	1–2	(Greece) AEK Athens
Bodø/Glimt (Norway)	0–5	(Germany) Borussia Dortmund
Manchester City (England)	0–2	(France) Paris Saint-Germain
Real Betis (Spain)	5–0	(Portugal) Porto
Slovan Bratislava (Slovakia)	1–0	(Germany) VfB Stuttgart

Matchday 3
Home team	Score	Away team
Fenerbahçe (Turkey)	1–3	(Czech Republic) Slavia Prague
Sabah (Azerbaijan)	0–2	(Germany) Borussia Dortmund
Roma (Italy)	5–0	(Slovakia) Slovan Bratislava
Porto (Portugal)	3–1	(Netherlands) PSV Eindhoven
Liverpool (England)	0–0	(Spain) Villarreal
Manchester City (England)	1–1	(Greece) AEK Athens
Paris Saint-Germain (France)	1–1	(Spain) Barcelona
Napoli (Italy)	1–0	(Norway) Bodø/Glimt
VfB Stuttgart (Germany)	2–4	(Spain) Atlético Madrid
Como (Italy)	2–1	(England) Manchester United
Lille (France)	3–1	(Turkey) Galatasaray
Aston Villa (England)	0–1	(Norway) Viking
Club Brugge (Belgium)	4–2	(France) Lens
Bayern Munich (Germany)	3–3	(England) Arsenal
Inter Milan (Italy)	2–0	(Ukraine) Shakhtar Donetsk
Real Madrid (Spain)	5–2	(Germany) RB Leipzig
Real Betis (Spain)	1–4	(Netherlands) Feyenoord
Sporting CP (Portugal)	2–1	(Austria) LASK

Matchday 4
Home team	Score	Away team
Shakhtar Donetsk (Ukraine)	1–3	(Portugal) Sporting CP
Galatasaray (Turkey)	2–2	(Germany) VfB Stuttgart
Atlético Madrid (Spain)	4–1	(Germany) Bayern Munich
Barcelona (Spain)	3–3	(England) Aston Villa
Feyenoord (Netherlands)	3–1	(Italy) Inter Milan
Bodø/Glimt (Norway)	2–1	(France) Lille
LASK (Austria)	2–1	(Slovakia) Slovan Bratislava
Manchester United (England)	1–1	(Italy) Roma
Villarreal (Spain)	3–0	(France) Paris Saint-Germain
AEK Athens (Greece)	1–4	(Spain) Real Madrid
Fenerbahçe (Turkey)	3–5	(England) Liverpool
Borussia Dortmund (Germany)	2–2	(Spain) Real Betis
Porto (Portugal)	3–1	(Italy) Napoli
PSV Eindhoven (Netherlands)	3–2	(Belgium) Club Brugge
RB Leipzig (Germany)	1–2	(England) Manchester City
Lens (France)	2–1	(Italy) Como
Slavia Prague (Czech Republic)	1–0	(England) Arsenal
Viking (Norway)	5–0	(Azerbaijan) Sabah

Matchday 5
Home team	Score	Away team
Bodø/Glimt (Norway)	24 Nov	(Austria) LASK
Galatasaray (Turkey)	24 Nov	(England) Aston Villa
Arsenal (England)	24 Nov	(Germany) Borussia Dortmund
Como (Italy)	24 Nov	(Greece) AEK Athens
Feyenoord (Netherlands)	24 Nov	(Portugal) Porto
Manchester City (England)	24 Nov	(Italy) Napoli
RB Leipzig (Germany)	24 Nov	(France) Lens
Real Madrid (Spain)	24 Nov	(Netherlands) PSV Eindhoven
Slovan Bratislava (Slovakia)	24 Nov	(Spain) Real Betis
Sabah (Azerbaijan)	25 Nov	(Spain) Barcelona
Slavia Prague (Czech Republic)	25 Nov	(Spain) Villarreal
Atlético Madrid (Spain)	25 Nov	(Norway) Viking
Club Brugge (Belgium)	25 Nov	(England) Liverpool
Inter Milan (Italy)	25 Nov	(Germany) VfB Stuttgart
Shakhtar Donetsk (Ukraine)	25 Nov	(Turkey) Fenerbahçe
Lille (France)	25 Nov	(Germany) Bayern Munich
Paris Saint-Germain (France)	25 Nov	(Italy) Roma
Sporting CP (Portugal)	25 Nov	(England) Manchester United

Matchday 6
Home team	Score	Away team
Viking (Norway)	8 Dec	(Netherlands) Feyenoord
Villarreal (Spain)	8 Dec	(Azerbaijan) Sabah
AEK Athens (Greece)	8 Dec	(Turkey) Galatasaray
Roma (Italy)	8 Dec	(Portugal) Sporting CP
Aston Villa (England)	8 Dec	(France) Paris Saint-Germain
Barcelona (Spain)	8 Dec	(England) Manchester City
Bayern Munich (Germany)	8 Dec	(Czech Republic) Slavia Prague
Manchester United (England)	8 Dec	(Germany) RB Leipzig
Napoli (Italy)	8 Dec	(Belgium) Club Brugge
Real Betis (Spain)	9 Dec	(Italy) Como
Slovan Bratislava (Slovakia)	9 Dec	(Ukraine) Shakhtar Donetsk
Arsenal (England)	9 Dec	(Spain) Real Madrid
Borussia Dortmund (Germany)	9 Dec	(Italy) Inter Milan
LASK (Austria)	9 Dec	(Turkey) Fenerbahçe
Liverpool (England)	9 Dec	(Portugal) Porto
PSV Eindhoven (Netherlands)	9 Dec	(Spain) Atlético Madrid
Lens (France)	9 Dec	(Norway) Bodø/Glimt
VfB Stuttgart (Germany)	9 Dec	(France) Lille

== Matches ==
The schedule was identical to the first six matchdays of the UEFA Champions League league phase, the fixture list for which was announced on 29 August 2026.

In principle, the matches will be played on the same day as the corresponding matches in the Champions League, unless the clubs and UEFA agree otherwise. The matches will be played on 8–10 September, 13–14 October, 20–21 October, 3–4 November, 24–25 November and 8–9 December 2026.

Times are CET or CEST, (Note: CEST (UTC+2) for dates up to 25 October 2026 (matchdays 1–3), and CET (UTC+1) for dates thereafter (matchdays 4–6).) as listed by UEFA (local times, if different, are in parentheses).

=== Matchday 1 ===
8 September 2026
11:00 (12:00 UTC+3)

AEK Athens (Greece)	0–0	(Austria) LASK
	Report

Spata Training Centre, Spata
Attendance: 450
Referee: David Rafael Oliveira Da Silva (Portugal)

8 September 2026
14:00

Club Brugge (Belgium)	5–3	(England) Aston Villa
Burgess 21' (o.g.); Koren 42', 53', 84'; Knouzi 79'	Report	McGrath 73', 90+1'; Meade 86'

Schiervelde Stadion, Roeselare
Attendance: 397
Referee: Mihály Káprály (Hungary)

8 September 2026
16:00

Borussia Dortmund (Germany)	2–3	(Spain) Villarreal
Roy 36'; Riedl 53'	Report	González García 39'; Barrera 68'; Held 73' (o.g.)

Dortmund Brackel Training Ground, Dortmund
Attendance: 630
Referee: Tural Kurbanov (Azerbaijan)

8 September 2026
13:00 (12:00 UTC+1)

Porto (Portugal)	3–1	(England) Manchester City
Silva 17' (pen.); Mide 43'; Jamanca 82'	Report	Lamb 73'

Estádio Luís Filipe Menezes, Vila Nova de Gaia
Attendance: 779
Referee: Lukáš Dzivjak (Slovakia)

8 September 2026
15:00

Lille (France)	0–0	(Spain) Real Betis
	Report

Domaine de Luchin, Camphin-en-Pévèle
Attendance: 495
Referee: Alex Johnson (Malta)

8 September 2026
16:00

Real Madrid (Spain)	3–0	(Italy) Inter Milan
Yáñez 32', 62'; Santamaría 90+2'	Report

Alfredo Di Stéfano Stadium, Madrid
Attendance: 537
Referee: Giorgi Avazashvili (Georgia)

9 September 2026
12:30

VfB Stuttgart (Germany)	5–0	(Norway) Viking
Redzepi 37' (pen.), 83' (pen.), 90+3'; Kenmoe 57'; Zezelj 90+1'	Report

WIRmachenDRUCK Arena, Aspach
Attendance: 450
Referee: Jakob Semler (Austria)

9 September 2026
16:00 (15:00 UTC+1)

Liverpool (England)	2–2	(Spain) Atlético Madrid
Ndiaye 27'; Sonni-Lambie 43'	Report	Sánchez 66'; Lis-Zieliński 90'

Liverpool Training Centre, Kirkby
Attendance: 153
Referee: Fotios Polychronis (Greece)

9 September 2026
14:30

Paris Saint-Germain (France)	6–1	(Slovakia) Slovan Bratislava
Ayari 10' (pen.), 41', 79'; Boly 32'; Idder 65'; Adnane 77'	Report	Šalkovič 88'

Campus PSG, Poissy
Attendance: 894
Referee: Patryk Gryckiewicz (Poland)

9 September 2026
15:00 (14:00 UTC+1)

Sporting CP (Portugal)	2–2	(Turkey) Galatasaray
Ferreira 90+4'; Coxi 90+9'	Report	Sivaslioglu 50'; Tagay 65'

Academia Cristiano Ronaldo, Alcochete
Attendance: 485
Referee: Bálint Kišš (Slovakia)

9 September 2026
14:00

Napoli (Italy)	1–2	(England) Arsenal
Pereyra 57'	Report	Harriman-Annous 28'; Muñoz 90+4'

Giuseppe Piccolo, Cercola
Attendance: 352
Referee: Ante Čulina (Croatia)

10 September 2026
9:30

Barcelona (Spain)	1–2	(Netherlands) Feyenoord
Vicens 77' (pen.)	Report	Zinhagel 9'; Schaken 23'

Johan Cruyff Stadium, Sant Joan Despí
Attendance: 582
Referee: Kyriakos Athanasiou (Cyprus)

10 September 2026
13:00 (14:00 UTC+3)

Fenerbahçe (Turkey)	2–4	(Italy) Roma
Ekici 29'; Kök 33'	Report	Paratici 56'; Guaglianone 70'; Maccaroni 84'; Falcetta 88'

Pendik Stadium, Istanbul
Attendance: 462
Referee: Karel Rouček (Czech Republic)

10 September 2026
14:00

PSV Eindhoven (Netherlands)	1–0	(Ukraine) Shakhtar Donetsk
Van Nistelrooy 10'	Report

De Herdgang, Eindhoven
Attendance: 280
Referee: Marius Hansen Grøtta (Norway)

10 September 2026
15:00

Como (Italy)	1–1	(Germany) RB Leipzig
Mazzara 75'	Report	Konaté 24'

Campo Sportivo Comunale "Angelo Volonte", Rovello Porro
Attendance: 400
Referee: Florian Lata (Albania)

10 September 2026
16:00

Bayern Munich (Germany)	6–1	(Norway) Bodø/Glimt
Codjo-Evora 3'; Olychenko 7'; Linaker Jenssen 50' (o.g.); Srb 57'; Egwuatu 88'; Assomo 90+1'	Report	Chooly 52'

FC Bayern Campus, Munich
Attendance: 700
Referee: Oguzhan Çakir (Turkey)

10 September 2026
15:00 (14:00 UTC+1)

Manchester United (England)	5–0	(Azerbaijan) Sabah
Ibragimov 2'; Watson 16'; Gabriel 45', 85', 87'	Report

Leigh Sports Village, Leigh
Attendance: 410
Referee: Simon Bourdeaud'hui (Belgium)

10 September 2026
14:00

Slavia Prague (Czech Republic)	2–1	(France) Lens
Potměšil 27', 56'	Report	Seddik 80'

Sports Centre Radotin, Prague
Attendance: 625
Referee: Jacob Karlsen (Denmark)

=== Matchday 2 ===
13 October 2026
13:00

Lens (France)	3–2	(Portugal) Sporting CP
Rocolat 64'; Manoir 76'; Diakité 90+2'	Report	Silva 3'; Mendy 74' (o.g.)

La Gaillett, Avion
Attendance: 1,378
Referee: Tom Owen (Wales)

13 October 2026
13:00 (15:00 UTC+4)

Sabah (Azerbaijan)	0–3	(Czech Republic) Slavia Prague
	Report	Szywała 5'; Kotrba 41' (pen.); Savović 90+4'

Alinja Stadium, Masazir
Attendance: 136
Referee: Marius Hansen Grøtta (Norway)

13 October 2026
13:00

Viking (Norway)	2–0	(Germany) Bayern Munich
Tveiten 36'; Arifagic 48'	Report

Øster Hus Arena, Sandnes
Attendance: 1,132
Referee: Marek Radina (Czech Republic)

13 October 2026
14:00 (13:00 UTC+1)

Arsenal (England)	2–3	(France) Lille
Ogunnaike 28'; Upson 58'	Report	Camara 15'; Traoré 36' (pen.); Boussadia 43'

Meadow Park, Borehamwood
Referee: Gal Levi (Israel)

13 October 2026
14:00 (22:00 UTC+3)

Galatasaray (Turkey)	0–1	(Spain) Barcelona
	Report	Rodríguez 18' (o.g.)

Ümraniye Stadyumu, Istanbul
Attendance: 232
Referee: Klym Zabroda (Ukraine)

13 October 2026
14:00

RB Leipzig (Germany)	1–6	(Netherlands) PSV Eindhoven
Klapija 11'	Report	Jones 28', 74'; Duran Can 77'; Dumbili 81'; Van Nistelrooij 88', 90+1'

RB Leipzig Fußball-Akademie, Leipzig
Attendance: 521
Referee: Mateo Tozan (Slovenia)

13 October 2026
15:00

Inter Milan (Italy)	1–1	(Belgium) Club Brugge
Carrara 1'	Report	Da Silva 87'

Centro Sportivo Giacinto Facchetti, Milan
Attendance: 508
Referee: Pavle Ilić (Serbia)

13 October 2026
16:00

Atlético Madrid (Spain)	3–0	(England) Manchester United
Sánchez 10'; Fitzgerald 31'; Gross 71'	Report

Centro Deportivo Wanda Alcalá de Henares, Alcalá de Henares
Attendance: 392
Referee: Cihan Aydın (Turkey)

13 October 2026
16:00

Villarreal (Spain)	5–0	(Italy) Napoli
Roca 5'; García 15', 60', 70', 87'	Report

Mini Estadi, Villarreal
Attendance: 805
Referee: Granit Maqedonci (Sweden)

14 October 2026
11:00

Bodø/Glimt (Norway)	0–5	(Germany) Borussia Dortmund
	Report	Garðarsson 28', 55'; Hoy 36' (pen.); Degener 79'; Fahrenhorst 89' (pen.)

Aspmyra Stadion, Bodø
Attendance: 577
Referee: Oliver Reitala (Finland)

14 October 2026
12:00

LASK (Austria)	2–4	(England) Liverpool
Krapf 23'; Ilk 51'	Report	Wright 57', 60', 88' (pen.); Eden 84'

Waldstadion, Pasching
Attendance: 1,008
Referee: Jan Všetečka (Czech Republic)

14 October 2026
13:00

Feyenoord (Netherlands)	1–0	(Italy) Como
Progetti 84'	Report

Sportcomplex Varkenoord, Rotterdam
Attendance: 1,012
Referee: Alexandros Tsakalidis (Greece)

14 October 2026
13:00

Shakhtar Donetsk (Ukraine)	1–2	(Greece) AEK Athens
Tiutiunov 66'	Report	Filippiadis 19'; Argyriou 52'

Kingsmeadow, Norbiton, England (Note: Due to the Russian invasion of Ukraine, Ukrainian teams were required to play their home matches at neutral venues until further notice.)
Attendance: 374
Referee: Lasse Læbel Graagaard (Denmark)

14 October 2026
14:00

Roma (Italy)	0–1	(Spain) Real Madrid
	Report	Díez 68'

Stadio Tre Fontane, Rome
Attendance: 1,250
Referee: Kamal Umudlu (Azerbaijan)

14 October 2026
14:00

Slovan Bratislava (Slovakia)	1–0	(Germany) VfB Stuttgart
Šalkovič 51'	Report

National Training Centre, Senec
Attendance: 1,400
Referee: Lothar D'hondt (Belgium)

14 October 2026
15:00 (14:00 UTC+1)

Aston Villa (England)	2–1	(Turkey) Fenerbahçe
Adediran 21'; Orebowale 67'	Report	Sayar 78'

Bodymoor Heath Training Ground, Tamworth
Attendance: 150
Referee: Łukasz Kuźma (Poland)

14 October 2026
15:00 (14:00 UTC+1)

Manchester City (England)	0–2	(France) Paris Saint-Germain
	Report	Meïté 15'; Ayari 78'

Academy Stadium, Manchester
Attendance: 530
Referee: Anojen Kanagasingam (Switzerland)

14 October 2026
15:00

Real Betis (Spain)	5–0	(Portugal) Porto
Oya 45+3'; Castilla 54', 76'; Reyes 58', 60'	Report

Ciudad Deportiva Luis del Sol, Seville
Attendance: 598
Referee: Matteo Marcenaro (Italy)

=== Matchday 3 ===
20 October 2026
13:00

Fenerbahçe (Turkey)	1–3	(Czech Republic) Slavia Prague
Ekici 8'	Report	Mašek 16'; Potměšil 22'; Belžík 72'

Pendik Stadium, Istanbul
Attendance: 205
Referee: Joakim Sars (Sweden)

20 October 2026
13:00

Sabah (Azerbaijan)	0–2	(Germany) Borussia Dortmund
	Report	Riedl 74'; Najdi 88'

Alinja Stadium, Baku
Attendance: 335
Referee: Giorgi Avazashvili (Georgia)

20 October 2026
13:00

Porto (Portugal)	3–1	(Netherlands) PSV Eindhoven
Ferreira 33', 90+3'; Mide 49'	Report	Ostrander 72' (pen.)

Estádio Luís Filipe Menezes, Vila Nova de Gaia
Attendance: 400
Referee: Tom Owen (Wales)

20 October 2026
14:00

Roma (Italy)	5–0	(Slovakia) Slovan Bratislava
Camara 35'; Paratici 61', 79', 85'; Arena 87'	Report

Stadio Tre Fontane, Rome
Attendance: 310
Referee: Robin Hensgens (The Netherlands)

20 October 2026
14:00

Paris Saint-Germain (France)	1–1	(Spain) Barcelona
Niakate 61'	Report	Rodriguez 74' (pen.)

Campus PSG, Poissy
Attendance: 1,590
Referee: Oguzhan Çakir (Turkey)

20 October 2026
14:00

Napoli (Italy)	1–0	(Norway) Bodø/Glimt
Riccio 31'	Report

Giuseppe Piccolo, Cercola
Attendance: 236
Referee: Olatz Rivera Olmedo (Spain)

20 October 2026
15:00

VfB Stuttgart (Germany)	2–4	(Spain) Atlético Madrid
Redzepi 19' (pen.), 67' (pen.)	Report	Obama 16', 28'; Trujillano 62'; Gross 90+4' (pen.)

WIRmachenDRUCK Arena, Aspach
Attendance: 1,942
Referee: Mohammad Usman Aslam (Norway)

20 October 2026
16:00

Liverpool (England)	0−0	(Spain) Villarreal
	Report

Liverpool Training Centre, Kirkby
Attendance: 172
Referee: Dovydas Švėgžda (Lithuania)

20 October 2026
16:00

Manchester City (England)	1−1	(Greece) AEK Athens
Lamb 8'	Report	Sioutas 5'

MCFC Academy Stadium, Manchester
Attendance: 550
Referee: Marek Radina (Czech Republic)

21 October 2026
13:00

Como (Italy)	2−1	(England) Manchester United
Papaccioli 4'; Albini 19'	Report	Fletcher 50'

Campo Sportivo Comunale "Angelo Volonte", Rovello Porro
Attendance: 438
Referee: Antoni Bandić (Bosnia and Herzegovina)

21 October 2026
14:00

Lille (France)	3−1	(Turkey) Galatasaray
Camara 28'; Boussadia 41', 55'	Report	Yançel 90+2'

Domaine de Luchin, Camphin-en-Pévèle
Attendance: 500
Referee: Stefan Ebner (Austria)

21 October 2026
15:00

Aston Villa (England)	0–1	(Norway) Viking
	Report	Frimpong 49'

Bodymoor Heath Training Ground, Bodymoor Heath
Attendance: 194
Referee: Florian Badstübner (Germany)

21 October 2026
15:00

Club Brugge (Belgium)	4–2	(France) Lens
Soria 29', 45+3'; Okon 34' (pen.); Kamara 74'	Report	Rocolat 11'; Niakate 67'

Schiervelde Stadion, Roeselare
Attendance: 333
Referee: Sven Wolfensberger (Switzerland)

21 October 2026
15:00

Real Betis (Spain)	1–4	(Netherlands) Feyenoord
De Road 28'	Report	Faik 38', 45+1'; Baks 51'; Neijenhuis 61'

Ciudad Deportiva Rafael Gordillo, Seville
Attendance: 320
Referee: Roman Jitari (Moldova)

21 October 2026
15:00

Sporting CP (Portugal)	2–1	(Austria) LASK
Blopa 48' (pen.); Camacho 90+2'	Report	Ilk 90+5' (pen.)

Academia Cristiano Ronaldo, Alcochete
Attendance: 321
Referee: Oliver Reitala (Finland)

21 October 2026
16:00

Bayern Munich (Germany)	3–3	(England) Arsenal
Lambe 15'; Osmani 30' (pen.); Della Rovere 43'	Report	Abubakar 11'; Salmon 68'; Nwaneri 90+1'

FC Bayern Campus, Munich
Attendance: 967
Referee: Bence Csonka (Hungary)

21 October 2026
16:00

Inter Milan (Italy)	2–0	(Ukraine) Shakhtar Donetsk
Vukaj 45+1'; Carrara 75'	Report

Youth Development Training Center, Milan
Attendance: 404
Referee: Damian Kos (Poland)

21 October 2026
16:00

Real Madrid (Spain)	5–2	(Germany) RB Leipzig
Alves 15'; Ciria 25'; Castellón 49'; Yáñez 56' (pen.); Rivera 71'	Report	Langsteiner 40'; Klapija 65'

Alfredo Di Stéfano Stadium, Madrid
Attendance: 693
Referee: Mihály Káprály (Hungary)

=== Matchday 4 ===
3 November 2026
11:00

Galatasaray (Turkey)	2–2	(Germany) VfB Stuttgart
Luş 23'; Tagay 73'	Report	Redzepi 49'; Kenmoe 87'

Ümraniye Municipality City Stadium, Istanbul
Attendance: 675
Referee: Luca Zufferli (Italy)

3 November 2026
11:00

Bodø/Glimt (Norway)	2–1	(France) Lille
Chooly 10' (pen.); Yeboah 61'	Report	Boussadia 78'

Aspmyra, Bodø
Attendance: 162
Referee: Martin Zhivkov Velikov (Bulgaria)

3 November 2026
13:00

Shakhtar Donetsk (Ukraine)	1–3	(Portugal) Sporting CP
Tverdokhlib 90+4'	Report	Grombahi 45'; Silva 59', 64'

Kingsmeadow, Kingston, England
Attendance: 237
Referee: Arnes Talic (Austria)

3 November 2026
13:00

Villarreal (Spain)	3–0	(France) Paris Saint-Germain
Traore 1'; Rodriguez 41', 81'	Report

Ciudad Deportiva Villarreal CF, Villarreal
Attendance: 1,085
Referee: Kamal Umudlu (Azerbaijan)

3 November 2026
14:00

Feyenoord (Netherlands)	3–1	(Italy) Inter Milan
Haps 4', 86' (pen.); El Harmouz 32'	Report	Vukaj 20'

Sportcomplex Varkenoord, Rotterdam
Attendance: 1,064
Referee: Menelaos Antoniou (Cyprus)

3 November 2026
14:00

Manchester United (England)	1–1	(Italy) Roma
Thompson 39'	Report	Arena 80' (pen.)

Leigh Sports Village, Leigh
Attendance: 595
Referee: Jacob Karlsen (Denmark)

3 November 2026
15:00

LASK (Austria)	2–1	(Slovakia) Slovan Bratislava
Krapf 12'; Wimmer 90+1'	Report	Verhaeghe 29' (o.g.)

Waldstadion, Pasching
Attendance: 500
Referee: Mateo Tozan (Slovenia)

3 November 2026
16:00

Atlético Madrid (Spain)	4–1	(Germany) Bayern Munich
Sánchez 11'; Kiala 42' (o.g.); Obama 49', 55'	Report	Srb 40'

Centro Deportivo Wanda Alcalá de Henares, Alcalá de Henares
Attendance: 572
Referee: Mathieu Vernice (France)

3 November 2026
16:00

Barcelona (Spain)	3–3	(England) Aston Villa
Tunkara 9'; Hernández 23'; Martinez 90'	Report	Carroll 37', 45+2'; Meade 81'

Johan Cruyff Stadium, Sant Joan Despí
Attendance: 959
Referee: Fotios Polychronis (Greece)

4 November 2026
11:00

AEK Athens (Greece)	1–4	(Spain) Real Madrid
Amanatidis 29'	Report	Villalba 49'; Alves 53'; Yáñez 58'; Gonçalves 79'

Spata Training Centre, Spata
Attendance: 1,321
Referee: Rares Vidican (Romania)

4 November 2026
12:00

Fenerbahçe (Turkey)	3–5	(England) Liverpool
Sayar 18', 29'; Yolaçan 68'	Report	Wright 3', 15' (pen.), 69'; Sonni-Lambie 20'; Inglethorpe 27'

Pendik Stadium, Istanbul
Attendance: 215
Referee: Andreu Simarro (Andorra)

4 November 2026
13:00

Viking (Norway)	5–0	(Azerbaijan) Sabah
Nordbø Middelthon 3'; Frimpong 6'; Kvelvane 32', 40' (pen.); Sandåker Hagen 48'	Report

Øster Hus Arena, Sandnes
Attendance: 500
Referee: Lasse Læbel Graagaard (Denmark)

4 November 2026
13:00

Porto (Portugal)	3–1	(Italy) Napoli
Silva 8' (pen.); Ferreira 50'; Cunha 64'	Report	Liccardo 71'

Estádio Luís Filipe Menezes, Vila Nova de Gaia
Attendance: 448
Referee: Florian Lata (Albania)

4 November 2026
14:00

PSV Eindhoven (Netherlands)	3–2	(Belgium) Club Brugge
Buyens 34'; Dumbili 36'; Van Nistelrooy 86'	Report	Ossohou 2'; Da Silva 47'

De Herdgang, Eindhoven
Attendance: 800
Referee: Mateo Erceg (Croatia)

4 November 2026
14:00

Lens (France)	2–1	(Italy) Como
Grini 8', 38'	Report	Cassano 44'

CTS La Gaillette, Avion
Attendance: 1,429
Referee: Matthew MacDermid (Scotland)

4 November 2026
14:00

Slavia Prague (Czech Republic)	1–0	(England) Arsenal
Solarte 90+1'	Report

Sports Centre Radotin, Prague
Attendance: 1,100
Referee: Artem Gasparyan (Armenia)

4 November 2026
15:00

RB Leipzig (Germany)	1−2	(England) Manchester City
Ogette 84'	Report	Lamb 53'; Oliver 57' (pen.)

RB Leipzig Fußball-Akademie, Leipzig
Referee: Konstantinos Fellas (Cyprus)

4 November 2026
16:00

Borussia Dortmund (Germany)	2−2	(Spain) Real Betis
Hoy 6'; Garðarsson 23'	Report	De Sá 12'; Batán 35'

Dortmund Brackel Training Ground, Dortmund
Attendance: 809
Referee: Wojciech Myc (Poland)

=== Matchday 5 ===
24 November 2026
11:00

Bodø/Glimt (Norway)	v	(Austria) LASK
	Report

Aspmyra, Bodø

24 November 2026
11:00

Galatasaray (Turkey)	v	(England) Aston Villa
	Report

Kasımpasa Recep Tayyip Erdoğan, Istanbul

24 November 2026
14:00

Arsenal (England)	v	(Germany) Borussia Dortmund
	Report

Meadow Park, Borehamwood

24 November 2026
15:00

Como (Italy)	v	(Greece) AEK Athens
	Report

Campo Sportivo Comunale "Angelo Volonte", Rovello Porro

24 November 2026
14:00

Feyenoord (Netherlands)	v	(Portugal) Porto
	Report

Sportcomplex Varkenoord, Rotterdam

24 November 2026
16:00

Manchester City (England)	v	(Italy) Napoli
	Report

MCFC Academy Stadium, Manchester

24 November 2026
16:00

RB Leipzig (Germany)	v	(France) Lens
	Report

RB Leipzig Fußball-Akademie, Leipzig

24 November 2026
16:00

Real Madrid (Spain)	v	(Netherlands) PSV Eindhoven
	Report

Alfredo Di Stéfano Stadium, Madrid

24 November 2026
14:00

Slovan Bratislava (Slovakia)	v	(Spain) Real Betis
	Report

National Training Centre, Senec

25 November 2026
12:00

Sabah (Azerbaijan)	v	(Spain) Barcelona
	Report

Alinja Stadium, Baku

25 November 2026
13:00

Slavia Prague (Czech Republic)	v	(Spain) Villarreal
	Report

Sports Centre Radotin, Prague

25 November 2026
16:00

Atlético Madrid (Spain)	v	(Norway) Viking
	Report

Atlético de Madrid Centro Deportivo Alcalá de Henares, Alcalá de Henares

25 November 2026
15:00

Club Brugge (Belgium)	v	(England) Liverpool
	Report

Schiervelde Stadion, Roeselare

25 November 2026
15:00

Inter Milan (Italy)	v	(Germany) VfB Stuttgart
	Report

Youth Development Training Center, Milan

25 November 2026
13:00

Shakhtar Donetsk (Ukraine)	v	(Turkey) Fenerbahçe
	Report

Kingsmeadow (stadium) Kingsmeadow, Kingston, England

25 November 2026
15:00

Lille (France)	v	(Germany) Bayern Munich
	Report

Domaine de Luchin, Camphin-en-Pévèle

25 November 2026
14:30

Paris Saint-Germain (France)	v	(Italy) Roma
	Report

Campus PSG, Poissy

25 November 2026
15:00

Sporting CP (Portugal)	v	(England) Manchester United
	Report

Academia Cristiano Ronaldo, Alcochete

=== Matchday 6 ===
8 December 2026
12:00

Viking (Norway)	v	(Netherlands) Feyenoord
	Report

Sandnes Ulf Arena, Sandnes

8 December 2026
12:00

Villarreal (Spain)	v	(Azerbaijan) Sabah
	Report

Mini Estadi de la Ciudad Deportiva del Villarreal, Villarreal

8 December 2026
14:00

AEK Athens (Greece)	v	(Turkey) Galatasaray
	Report

Spata Training Centre, Spata

8 December 2026
14:00

Roma (Italy)	v	(Portugal) Sporting CP
	Report

Stadio Tre Fontane, Rome

8 December 2026
15:00

Aston Villa (England)	v	(France) Paris Saint-Germain
	Report

Aston Villa FC Training Ground, Tamworth

8 December 2026
16:00

Barcelona (Spain)	v	(England) Manchester City
	Report

Johan Cruyff Stadium, Sant Joan Despí

8 December 2026
16:00

Bayern Munich (Germany)	v	(Czech Republic) Slavia Prague
	Report

FC Bayern Campus, Munich

8 December 2026
15:00

Manchester United (England)	v	(Germany) RB Leipzig
	Report

Leigh Sports Village, Leigh

8 December 2026
14:00

Napoli (Italy)	v	(Belgium) Club Brugge
	Report

Giuseppe Piccolo, Cercola

9 December 2026
13:00

Real Betis (Spain)	v	(Italy) Como
	Report

Ciudad Deportiva Luis del Sol, Seville

9 December 2026
13:00

Slovan Bratislava (Slovakia)	v	(Ukraine) Shakhtar Donetsk
	Report

National Training Centre, Senec

9 December 2026
14:00

Arsenal (England)	v	(Spain) Real Madrid
	Report

Meadow Park, Borehamwood

9 December 2026
16:00

Borussia Dortmund (Germany)	v	(Italy) Inter Milan
	Report

Dortmund Brackel Training Ground, Dortmund

9 December 2026
15:00

LASK (Austria)	v	(Turkey) Fenerbahçe
	Report

Waldstadion, Pasching

9 December 2026

Liverpool (England)	v	(Portugal) Porto
	Report

Liverpool Training Centre, Kirkby

9 December 2026
14:00

PSV Eindhoven (Netherlands)	v	(Spain) Atlético Madrid
	Report

De Herdgang, Eindhoven

9 December 2026
14:00

Lens (France)	v	(Norway) Bodø/Glimt
	Report

CTS La Gaillette, Avion

9 December 2026
15:00

VfB Stuttgart (Germany)	v	(France) Lille
	Report

WIRmachenDRUCK Arena, Aspach
