= 2026–27 in Spanish football =

Football in Spain
- Season: 2026–27

The 2026–27 season is the 125th season of competitive association football in Spain.

== National team ==
=== UEFA Nations League ===
==== UEFA Nations League A ====
===== Group 3 =====
Pos	Team	Pld	W	D	L	GF	GA	GD	Pts	Qualification or relegation	(England)	(Spain)	(Croatia)	(Czech Republic)
1	England	6	5	0	1	19	6	+13	15 (Note: Tied on head-to-head results. Overall goal difference: England +13, Spain +8.)	Advance to quarter-finals	—	2–3	2–1	3–0
2	Spain	6	5	0	1	16	8	+8	15	Advance to quarter-finals	2–3	—	4–1	3–1
3	Croatia	6	2	0	4	7	17	−10	6	Qualification for relegation play-offs	0–7	1–2	—	2–1
4	Czech Republic (R)	6	0	0	6	3	14	−11	0	Relegated to League B	0–2	0–2	1–2	—

Source: UEFA
Rules for classification: Tiebreakers
(R) Relegated
Notes:

26 September 2026	England	2–3	Spain	London, England
19:45 UTC+1	Gordon 36'; Kane 40'	Report	Yamal 2'; Baena 60'; Oyarzabal 74'	Stadium: Wembley Stadium; Attendance: 84,525; Referee: Davide Massa (Italy)

29 September 2026	Spain	4–1	Croatia	Seville, Spain
20:45 UTC+2	Yamal 2', 63'; Pubill 31'; Williams 89'	Report	Beljo 28'	Stadium: Estadio Ramón Sánchez-Pizjuán; Attendance: 40,294; Referee: Serdar Gözübüyük (Netherlands)

3 October 2026	Spain	3–1	Czech Republic	Oviedo, Spain
20:45 UTC+2	Yamal 6'; Rodri 35'; Merino 89'	Report	Sláma 69'	Stadium: Estadio Carlos Tartiere; Attendance: 28,515; Referee: Vassilis Fotias (Greece)

6 October 2026	Croatia	1–2	Spain	Split, Croatia
20:45 UTC+2	Perišić 17'	Report	Merino 61', 88'	Stadium: Stadion Poljud; Attendance: 32,690; Referee: Erik Lambrechts (Belgium)

12 November 2026	Czech Republic	0–2	Spain	Prague, Czech Republic
20:45 UTC+1		Report	Baena 39' (pen.); Pubill 90+6'	Stadium: Fortuna Arena; Attendance: 18,193; Referee: Nikola Dabanović (Montenegro)

15 November 2026	Spain	2–3	England	Madrid, Spain
20:45 UTC+1	Oyarzabal 65' (pen.); Williams 75'	Report	Kane 45' (pen.); Konsa 53'; White 57'	Stadium: Estadio Metropolitano; Attendance: 63,788; Referee: Clément Turpin (France)

===== Quarter-finals =====
Team 1	Agg.	Team 2	1st leg	2nd leg
Spain		France	25 Mar	28 Mar

25 March 2027 Quarter-finals	Spain	v	France
		Report

28 March 2027 Quarter-finals	France	v	Spain
		Report

=== Spain women's national football team ===
==== Friendlies ====
10 October 2026	United States	v	Spain	Washington, D.C., United States
20:30				Stadium: Audi Field

13 October 2026	United States	v	Spain	Chester, United States
01:00				Stadium: Subaru Park

=== U–20 ===
==== FIFA U-20 Women's World Cup ====
===== Group F =====
Pos	Team	Pld	W	D	L	GF	GA	GD	Pts	Qualification
1	Spain	3	3	0	0	16	1	+15	9	Knockout stage
2	Nigeria	3	1	1	1	10	3	+7	4	Knockout stage
3	China	3	1	1	1	6	3	+3	4	Knockout stage
4	New Caledonia	3	0	0	3	1	26	−25	0	

Source: FIFA
Rules for classification: Group stage tiebreakers

===== Knockout stage =====
16 September 2026 R16	Spain	2–0	Portugal	Katowice, Poland
18:30	M. García 9'; Pina 70' (o.g.)	Report		Stadium: Arena Katowice; Attendance: 491; Referee: Asaka Koizumi (Japan)

19 September 2026 QF	Brazil	0–1	Spain	Sosnowiec, Poland
18:30		Report	Comendador 27'	Stadium: Arena Sosnowiec; Attendance: 1,015; Referee: Lizzet Amairany García Olvera (Mexico)

23 September 2026 SF	Italy	v	Spain	Łódź, Poland
15:00		Report		Stadium: Stadion Miejski ŁKS Łódź

September 2026 F/3rd	v	Spain	Łódź, Poland
			Stadium: Stadion Miejski ŁKS Łódź

== UEFA competitions ==
=== UEFA Champions League ===
==== League phase ====
===== Atlético Madrid =====
Pos	Team	Pld	W	D	L	GF	GA	GD	Pts	Qualification
21	(Ukraine) Shakhtar Donetsk	4	1	1	2	4	4	0	4	Advance to knockout phase play-offs (unseeded)
22	(Norway) Viking	4	1	1	2	9	10	−1	4	Advance to knockout phase play-offs (unseeded)
23	(Spain) Atlético Madrid	4	1	1	2	4	5	−1	4	Advance to knockout phase play-offs (unseeded)
24	(Netherlands) PSV Eindhoven	4	1	1	2	3	4	−1	4	Advance to knockout phase play-offs (unseeded)
25	(Norway) Bodø/Glimt	4	1	1	2	4	9	−5	4	

Updated to match(es) played on 4 November 2026. Source: UEFA
Rules for classification: League phase tiebreakers

Home team	Score	Away team
Liverpool (England)	2–1	(Spain) Atlético Madrid
Atlético Madrid (Spain)	2–0	(England) Manchester United
VfB Stuttgart (Germany)	1–1	(Spain) Atlético Madrid
Atlético Madrid (Spain)	0–2	(Germany) Bayern Munich
Atlético Madrid (Spain)	25 Nov	(Norway) Viking
PSV Eindhoven (Netherlands)	9 Dec	(Spain) Atlético Madrid
Bodø/Glimt (Norway)	19 Jan	(Spain) Atlético Madrid
Atlético Madrid (Spain)	27 Jan	(Turkey) Fenerbahçe

===== Barcelona =====
Pos	Team	Pld	W	D	L	GF	GA	GD	Pts	Qualification
3	(England) Arsenal	4	3	1	0	8	3	+5	10	Advance to round of 16 (seeded)
4	(Italy) Como	4	3	0	1	19	6	+13	9	Advance to round of 16 (seeded)
5	(Spain) Barcelona	4	3	0	1	14	6	+8	9	Advance to round of 16 (seeded)
6	(England) Aston Villa	4	3	0	1	12	6	+6	9	Advance to round of 16 (seeded)
7	(England) Manchester City	4	3	0	1	12	7	+5	9	Advance to round of 16 (seeded)

Updated to match(es) played on 4 November 2026. Source: UEFA
Rules for classification: League phase tiebreakers

Home team	Score	Away team
Barcelona (Spain)	5–1	(Netherlands) Feyenoord
Galatasaray (Turkey)	1–4	(Spain) Barcelona
Paris Saint-Germain (France)	4–2	(Spain) Barcelona
Barcelona (Spain)	3–0	(England) Aston Villa
Sabah (Azerbaijan)	25 Nov	(Spain) Barcelona
Barcelona (Spain)	8 Dec	(England) Manchester City
Sporting CP (Portugal)	20 Jan	(Spain) Barcelona
Barcelona (Spain)	27 Jan	(Italy) Como

===== Real Betis =====
Pos	Team	Pld	W	D	L	GF	GA	GD	Pts	Qualification
9	(Belgium) Club Brugge	4	3	0	1	11	7	+4	9	Advance to knockout phase play-offs (seeded)
10	(Portugal) Sporting CP	4	3	0	1	8	4	+4	9	Advance to knockout phase play-offs (seeded)
11	(Spain) Real Betis	4	3	0	1	8	6	+2	9	Advance to knockout phase play-offs (seeded)
12	(Germany) Borussia Dortmund	4	3	0	1	7	5	+2	9	Advance to knockout phase play-offs (seeded)
13	(Germany) Bayern Munich	4	2	2	0	12	5	+7	8	Advance to knockout phase play-offs (seeded)

Updated to match(es) played on 4 November 2026. Source: UEFA
Rules for classification: League phase tiebreakers

Home team	Score	Away team
Lille (France)	2–3	(Spain) Real Betis
Real Betis (Spain)	3–2	(Portugal) Porto
Real Betis (Spain)	1–0	(Netherlands) Feyenoord
Borussia Dortmund (Germany)	2–1	(Spain) Real Betis
Slovan Bratislava (Slovakia)	24 Nov	(Spain) Real Betis
Real Betis (Spain)	9 Dec	(Italy) Como
Real Betis (Spain)	20 Jan	(England) Arsenal
Bayern Munich (Germany)	27 Jan	(Spain) Real Betis

===== Real Madrid =====
Pos	Team	Pld	W	D	L	GF	GA	GD	Pts	Qualification
1	(France) Paris Saint-Germain	4	4	0	0	20	5	+15	12	Advance to round of 16 (seeded)
2	(Spain) Real Madrid	4	4	0	0	13	7	+6	12	Advance to round of 16 (seeded)
3	(England) Arsenal	4	3	1	0	8	3	+5	10	Advance to round of 16 (seeded)
4	(Italy) Como	4	3	0	1	19	6	+13	9	Advance to round of 16 (seeded)
5	(Spain) Barcelona	4	3	0	1	14	6	+8	9	Advance to round of 16 (seeded)

Updated to match(es) played on 4 November 2026. Source: UEFA
Rules for classification: League phase tiebreakers

Home team	Score	Away team
Real Madrid (Spain)	2–1	(Italy) Inter Milan
Roma (Italy)	3–4	(Spain) Real Madrid
Real Madrid (Spain)	4–1	(Germany) RB Leipzig
AEK Athens (Greece)	2–3	(Spain) Real Madrid
Real Madrid (Spain)	24 Nov	(Netherlands) PSV Eindhoven
Arsenal (England)	9 Dec	(Spain) Real Madrid
Real Madrid (Spain)	19 Jan	(Austria) LASK
Shakhtar Donetsk (Ukraine)	27 Jan	(Spain) Real Madrid

===== Villarreal =====
Pos	Team	Pld	W	D	L	GF	GA	GD	Pts
26	(Portugal) Porto	4	1	0	3	6	7	−1	3
27	(Italy) Napoli	4	1	0	3	6	11	−5	3
28	(Spain) Villarreal	4	1	0	3	8	14	−6	3
29	(Greece) AEK Athens	4	1	0	3	5	11	−6	3
29	(Germany) RB Leipzig	4	1	0	3	5	11	−6	3

Updated to match(es) played on 4 November 2026. Source: UEFA
Rules for classification: League phase tiebreakers

Home team	Score	Away team
Borussia Dortmund (Germany)	3–2	(Spain) Villarreal
Villarreal (Spain)	3–1	(Italy) Napoli
Liverpool (England)	4–3	(Spain) Villarreal
Villarreal (Spain)	0–6	(France) Paris Saint-Germain
Slavia Prague (Czech Republic)	25 Nov	(Spain) Villarreal
Villarreal (Spain)	8 Dec	(Azerbaijan) Sabah
Fenerbahçe (Turkey)	20 Jan	(Spain) Villarreal
Villarreal (Spain)	27 Jan	(England) Manchester United

=== UEFA Europa League ===
==== League phase ====
===== Celta Vigo =====
Pos	Team	Pld	W	D	L	GF	GA	GD	Pts
25	(Slovenia) Celje	4	1	1	2	5	9	−4	4
26	(Austria) Red Bull Salzburg	4	1	1	2	3	8	−5	4
27	(Spain) Celta Vigo	4	1	0	3	4	6	−2	3
28	(Italy) Milan	4	1	0	3	4	7	−3	3
29	(Poland) Jagiellonia Białystok	4	1	0	3	4	7	−3	3

Updated to match(es) played on 5 November 2026. Source: UEFA
Rules for classification: League phase tiebreakers

Home team	Score	Away team
Omonia (Cyprus)	1–0	(Spain) Celta Vigo
Celta Vigo (Spain)	1–2	(Italy) Juventus
Celtic (Scotland)	1–2	(Spain) Celta Vigo
Celta Vigo (Spain)	1–2	(Belgium) Union Saint-Gilloise
Celta Vigo (Spain)	26 Nov	(England) Bournemouth
Marseille (France)	10 Dec	(Spain) Celta Vigo
Hapoel Be'er Sheva (Israel)	21 Jan	(Spain) Celta Vigo
Celta Vigo (Spain)	28 Jan	(Norway) Lillestrøm

===== Real Sociedad =====
Pos	Team	Pld	W	D	L	GF	GA	GD	Pts	Qualification
18	(Cyprus) Omonia	4	2	0	2	6	7	−1	6	Advance to knockout phase play-offs (unseeded)
19	(Portugal) Torreense	4	2	0	2	7	9	−2	6	Advance to knockout phase play-offs (unseeded)
20	(Spain) Real Sociedad	4	1	2	1	9	4	+5	5	Advance to knockout phase play-offs (unseeded)
21	(England) Crystal Palace	4	1	2	1	9	6	+3	5	Advance to knockout phase play-offs (unseeded)
22	(Czech Republic) Sparta Prague	4	1	1	2	6	6	0	4	Advance to knockout phase play-offs (unseeded)

Updated to match(es) played on 5 November 2026. Source: UEFA
Rules for classification: League phase tiebreakers

Home team	Score	Away team
Real Sociedad (Spain)	1–2	(England) Bournemouth
Union Saint-Gilloise (Belgium)	1–1	(Spain) Real Sociedad
Lillestrøm (Norway)	0–6	(Spain) Real Sociedad
Real Sociedad (Spain)	1–1	(France) Lyon
Crystal Palace (England)	26 Nov	(Spain) Real Sociedad
Real Sociedad (Spain)	10 Dec	(Portugal) Torreense
Real Sociedad (Spain)	21 Jan	(Czech Republic) Viktoria Plzeň
Juventus (Italy)	28 Jan	(Spain) Real Sociedad

=== UEFA Conference League ===
==== Qualifying round ====
===== Play-off round =====
Play-off round
Team 1	Agg.	Team 2	1st leg	2nd leg
Getafe (Spain)	4–3	(Serbia) Partizan	3–1	1–2

==== League phase ====
===== Getafe =====
Pos	Team	Pld	W	D	L	GF	GA	GD	Pts
29	(Georgia (country)) Iberia 1999	3	0	1	2	2	5	−3	1
30	(Cyprus) Pafos	3	0	1	2	3	7	−4	1
31	(Spain) Getafe	3	0	1	2	3	7	−4	1
32	(Scotland) Heart of Midlothian	3	0	1	2	2	6	−4	1
33	(Finland) KuPS	3	0	1	2	2	6	−4	1

Updated to match(es) played on 5 November 2026. Source: UEFA
Rules for classification: League phase tiebreakers

Home team	Score	Away team
Universitatea Craiova (Romania)	1–1	(Spain) Getafe
Getafe (Spain)	2–5	(Switzerland) Lugano
Getafe (Spain)	0–1	(England) Brighton & Hove Albion
Iberia 1999 (Georgia (country))	26 Nov	(Spain) Getafe
Getafe (Spain)	10 Dec	(Andorra) Inter Club d'Escaldes
Ajax (Netherlands)	17 Dec	(Spain) Getafe

=== UEFA Women's Champions League ===
==== Qualifying rounds ====
===== Third qualifying round =====
Third qualifying round
Team 1	Agg.	Team 2	1st leg	2nd leg
Chelsea (England)	6–2	(Spain) Real Sociedad	5–2	1–0
Ajax (Netherlands)	1–4	(Spain) Real Madrid	0–2	1–2

==== League stage ====
===== Barcelona =====
Pos	Team	Pld	W	D	L	GF	GA	GD	Pts	Qualification
1	(Royal Spanish Football Federation) Barcelona (Q)	5	4	1	0	26	3	+23	13	Advance to the quarter-finals (seeded)
2	(French Football Federation) OL Lyonnes (Q)	5	4	1	0	22	0	+22	13	Advance to the quarter-finals (seeded)
3	(German Football Association) Bayern Munich (T)	5	3	2	0	13	5	+8	11	Advance to the quarter-finals (seeded)
4	(The Football Association) Chelsea (T)	5	3	2	0	4	0	+4	11	Advance to the quarter-finals (seeded)
5	(The Football Association) Manchester City (T)	5	2	3	0	10	5	+5	9 (Note: Ranked based on away goals scored, Manchester City 8, Real Madrid 3)	Advance to the knockout phase play-offs (seeded)

Updated to match(es) played on 19 November 2026. Source: UEFA
Rules for classification: League phase tiebreakers
(Q) Qualified for the phase indicated; (T) Qualified, but not yet for the particular phase indicated
Notes:

Home team	Score	Away team
Barcelona (Spain)	5–2	(France) Paris FC
Roma (Italy)	0–6	(Spain) Barcelona
HB Køge (Denmark)	0–8	(Spain) Barcelona
Barcelona (Spain)	12 Nov	(England) Arsenal
Barcelona (Spain)	19 Nov	(Switzerland) Servette Chênois
Bayern Munich (Germany)	16 Dec	(Spain) Barcelona

===== Real Madrid =====
Pos	Team	Pld	W	D	L	GF	GA	GD	Pts	Qualification
4	(The Football Association) Chelsea (T)	5	3	2	0	4	0	+4	11	Advance to the quarter-finals (seeded)
5	(The Football Association) Manchester City (T)	5	2	3	0	10	5	+5	9 (Note: Ranked based on away goals scored, Manchester City 8, Real Madrid 3)	Advance to the knockout phase play-offs (seeded)
6	(Royal Spanish Football Federation) Real Madrid (T)	5	2	3	0	10	5	+5	9	Advance to the knockout phase play-offs (seeded)
7	(Italian Football Federation) Juventus (T)	5	3	0	2	10	9	+1	9	Advance to the knockout phase play-offs (seeded)
8	(The Football Association) Arsenal (T)	5	2	2	1	7	5	+2	8	Advance to the knockout phase play-offs (seeded)

Updated to match(es) played on 19 November 2026. Source: UEFA
Rules for classification: League phase tiebreakers
(T) Qualified, but not yet for the particular phase indicated
Notes:

Home team	Score	Away team
Real Madrid (Spain)	1–1	(France) Paris Saint-Germain
Manchester City (England)	1–1	(Spain) Real Madrid
Bayern Munich (Germany)	2–2	(Spain) Real Madrid
Real Madrid (Spain)	3–0	(France) Paris FC
Real Madrid (Spain)	18 Nov	(Italy) Inter Milan
Roma (Italy)	16 Dec	(Spain) Real Madrid

=== UEFA Women's Europa Cup ===
==== Qualifying rounds ====
===== Second qualifying round =====
Second qualifying round
Team 1	Agg.	Team 2	1st leg	2nd leg
Heart of Midlothian (Scotland)	0–4	(Spain) Real Sociedad	0–0	0–4

==== Knockout stage ====
===== Round of 16 =====
Round of 16
Team 1	Agg.	Team 2	1st leg	2nd leg
Real Sociedad (Spain)	4–0	(Turkey) Fenerbahçe	2–0	2–0

===== Quarter-finals =====
Round of 16
Team 1	Agg.	Team 2	1st leg	2nd leg
Eintracht Frankfurt (Germany)		(Spain) Real Sociedad	3–4 Feb	10–11 Feb

=== UEFA Youth League ===
==== UEFA Champions League Path ====
===== Atlético Madrid =====
Pos	Team	Pld	W	D	L	GF	GA	GD	Pts	Qualification
3	(Czech Republic) Slavia Prague (A)	4	4	0	0	9	2	+7	12	Advance to knockout phase
4	(Spain) Villarreal	4	3	1	0	11	2	+9	10	Advance to knockout phase
5	(Spain) Atlético Madrid	4	3	1	0	13	5	+8	10	Advance to knockout phase
6	(Netherlands) PSV Eindhoven	4	3	0	1	11	6	+5	9	Advance to knockout phase
7	(Norway) Viking	4	3	0	1	8	5	+3	9	Advance to knockout phase

Updated to match(es) played on 4 November 2026. Source: UEFA
Rules for classification: League phase tiebreakers
(A) Advance to a further round

Home team	Score	Away team
Liverpool (England)	2–2	(Spain) Atlético Madrid
Atlético Madrid (Spain)	3–0	(England) Manchester United
VfB Stuttgart (Germany)	2–4	(Spain) Atlético Madrid
Atlético Madrid (Spain)	4–1	(Germany) Bayern Munich
Atlético Madrid (Spain)	25 Nov	(Norway) Viking
PSV Eindhoven (Netherlands)	9 Dec	(Spain) Atlético Madrid

===== Barcelona =====
Pos	Team	Pld	W	D	L	GF	GA	GD	Pts	Qualification
16	(France) Lens	4	2	0	2	8	9	−1	6	Advance to knockout phase
17	(Spain) Real Betis	4	1	2	1	8	6	+2	5	Advance to knockout phase
18	(Spain) Barcelona	4	1	2	1	6	6	0	5	Advance to knockout phase
19	(Greece) AEK Athens	4	1	2	1	4	6	−2	5	Advance to knockout phase
20	(Germany) VfB Stuttgart	4	1	1	2	9	7	+2	4	Advance to knockout phase

Updated to match(es) played on 4 November 2026. Source: UEFA
Rules for classification: League phase tiebreakers

Home team	Score	Away team
Barcelona (Spain)	1–2	(Netherlands) Feyenoord
Galatasaray (Turkey)	0–1	(Spain) Barcelona
Paris Saint-Germain (France)	1–1	(Spain) Barcelona
Barcelona (Spain)	3–3	(England) Aston Villa
Sabah (Azerbaijan)	25 Nov	(Spain) Barcelona
Barcelona (Spain)	8 Dec	(England) Manchester City

===== Real Betis =====
Pos	Team	Pld	W	D	L	GF	GA	GD	Pts	Qualification
15	(France) Lille	4	2	1	1	7	5	+2	7	Advance to knockout phase
16	(France) Lens	4	2	0	2	8	9	−1	6	Advance to knockout phase
17	(Spain) Real Betis	4	1	2	1	8	6	+2	5	Advance to knockout phase
18	(Spain) Barcelona	4	1	2	1	6	6	0	5	Advance to knockout phase
19	(Greece) AEK Athens	4	1	2	1	4	6	−2	5	Advance to knockout phase

Updated to match(es) played on 4 November 2026. Source: UEFA
Rules for classification: League phase tiebreakers

Home team	Score	Away team
Lille (France)	0–0	(Spain) Real Betis
Real Betis (Spain)	5–0	(Portugal) Porto
Real Betis (Spain)	1–4	(Netherlands) Feyenoord
Borussia Dortmund (Germany)	2–2	(Spain) Real Betis
Slovan Bratislava (Slovakia)	24 Nov	(Spain) Real Betis
Real Betis (Spain)	9 Dec	(Italy) Como

===== Real Madrid =====
Pos	Team	Pld	W	D	L	GF	GA	GD	Pts	Qualification
1	(Spain) Real Madrid (A)	4	4	0	0	13	3	+10	12	Advance to knockout phase
2	(Netherlands) Feyenoord (A)	4	4	0	0	10	3	+7	12	Advance to knockout phase
3	(Czech Republic) Slavia Prague (A)	4	4	0	0	9	2	+7	12	Advance to knockout phase
4	(Spain) Villarreal	4	3	1	0	11	2	+9	10	Advance to knockout phase
5	(Spain) Atlético Madrid	4	3	1	0	13	5	+8	10	Advance to knockout phase

Updated to match(es) played on 4 November 2026. Source: UEFA
Rules for classification: League phase tiebreakers
(A) Advance to a further round

Home team	Score	Away team
Real Madrid (Spain)	3–0	(Italy) Inter Milan
Roma (Italy)	0–1	(Spain) Real Madrid
Real Madrid (Spain)	5–2	(Germany) RB Leipzig
AEK Athens (Greece)	1–4	(Spain) Real Madrid
Real Madrid (Spain)	24 Nov	(Netherlands) PSV Eindhoven
Arsenal (England)	9 Dec	(Spain) Real Madrid

===== Villarreal =====
Pos	Team	Pld	W	D	L	GF	GA	GD	Pts	Qualification
2	(Netherlands) Feyenoord (A)	4	4	0	0	10	3	+7	12	Advance to knockout phase
3	(Czech Republic) Slavia Prague (A)	4	4	0	0	9	2	+7	12	Advance to knockout phase
4	(Spain) Villarreal	4	3	1	0	11	2	+9	10	Advance to knockout phase
5	(Spain) Atlético Madrid	4	3	1	0	13	5	+8	10	Advance to knockout phase
6	(Netherlands) PSV Eindhoven	4	3	0	1	11	6	+5	9	Advance to knockout phase

Updated to match(es) played on 4 November 2026. Source: UEFA
Rules for classification: League phase tiebreakers
(A) Advance to a further round

Home team	Score	Away team
Borussia Dortmund (Germany)	2–3	(Spain) Villarreal
Villarreal (Spain)	5–0	(Italy) Napoli
Liverpool (England)	0–0	(Spain) Villarreal
Villarreal (Spain)	3–0	(France) Paris Saint-Germain
Slavia Prague (Czech Republic)	25 Nov	(Spain) Villarreal
Villarreal (Spain)	8 Dec	(Azerbaijan) Sabah

== Men's football ==
=== League season ===
==== La Liga ====
Pos	Team	Pld	W	D	L	GF	GA	GD	Pts	Qualification or relegation
1	Barcelona	12	11	0	1	48	13	+35	33	Qualification for the UEFA Champions League league phase
2	Real Madrid	12	10	0	2	31	10	+21	30	Qualification for the UEFA Champions League league phase
3	Atlético Madrid	12	9	1	2	23	10	+13	28	Qualification for the UEFA Champions League league phase
4	Real Betis	12	8	2	2	20	15	+5	26	Qualification for the UEFA Champions League league phase
5	Real Sociedad	12	7	1	4	21	20	+1	22	Qualification for the UEFA Europa League league phase
6	Sevilla	12	5	3	4	17	19	−2	18	Qualification for the UEFA Conference League play-off round
7	Athletic Bilbao	11	4	4	3	15	11	+4	16	
8	Villarreal	12	4	3	5	17	15	+2	15	
9	Deportivo A Coruña	12	3	6	3	15	14	+1	15	
10	Racing Santander	12	4	2	6	17	30	−13	14	
11	Celta Vigo	12	2	7	3	10	10	0	13	
12	Alavés	12	3	4	5	15	17	−2	13	
13	Espanyol	12	3	3	6	13	14	−1	12	
14	Rayo Vallecano	11	3	3	5	15	21	−6	12	
15	Getafe	12	3	3	6	8	18	−10	12	
16	Osasuna	12	3	3	6	12	23	−11	12	
17	Levante	12	2	5	5	16	21	−5	11	
18	Elche	12	2	4	6	14	20	−6	10	Relegation to Segunda División
19	Valencia	12	2	3	7	8	20	−12	9	Relegation to Segunda División
20	Málaga	12	0	5	7	9	23	−14	5	Relegation to Segunda División

Updated to match(es) played on 8 November 2026. Source: LaLiga EA Sports
Rules for classification: 1) Points; 2) Head-to-head points; 3) Head-to-head goal difference; 4) Goal difference; 5) Goals scored; 6) Fair-play points (if three or more teams tied); 7) Play-off at neutral site.
(Note: Head-to-head record is used only after all the matches between the teams in question have been played)

==== Segunda División ====
Pos	Team	Pld	W	D	L	GF	GA	GD	Pts	Qualification or relegation
1	Almería	14	10	2	2	26	11	+15	32	Promotion to La Liga
2	Castellón	13	9	3	1	24	5	+19	30	Promotion to La Liga
3	Granada	13	8	2	3	21	14	+7	26	Qualification for promotion play-offs
4	Girona	14	7	3	4	24	13	+11	24	Qualification for promotion play-offs
5	Eibar	13	7	3	3	22	15	+7	24	Qualification for promotion play-offs
6	Burgos	14	7	3	4	20	17	+3	24	Qualification for promotion play-offs
7	Mallorca	13	6	5	2	18	10	+8	23	
8	Sporting Gijón	14	7	2	5	16	17	−1	23	
9	Oviedo	14	6	3	5	20	18	+2	21	
10	Córdoba	14	6	2	6	25	25	0	20	
11	Las Palmas	14	6	2	6	19	22	−3	20	
12	Valladolid	14	5	3	6	22	21	+1	18	
13	Sabadell	14	4	6	4	12	13	−1	18	
14	Tenerife	13	4	6	3	17	17	0	18	
15	Eldense	14	5	2	7	15	19	−4	17	
16	Leganés	14	4	3	7	14	24	−10	15	
17	Celta Fortuna	14	3	4	7	19	26	−7	13	Not eligible for promotion
18	Real Sociedad B	14	3	4	7	17	24	−7	13	Not eligible for promotion
19	Albacete	14	4	1	9	14	24	−10	13	Relegation to Primera Federación
20	Cádiz	14	2	5	7	17	19	−2	11	Relegation to Primera Federación
21	Andorra	13	3	2	8	18	23	−5	11	Relegation to Primera Federación
22	Ceuta	14	1	2	11	10	32	−22	5	Relegation to Primera Federación

Updated to match(es) played on 16 November 2026. Source: LaLiga Hypermotion
Rules for classification: 1) Points; 2) Head-to-head points; 3) Head-to-head goal difference; 4) Goal difference; 5) Goals scored; 6) Fair-play points
(Note: Head-to-head record is used only after all the matches between the teams in question have been played)

== Women's football ==
=== League season ===
==== Liga F ====
Pos	Team	Pld	W	D	L	GF	GA	GD	Pts	Qualification or relegation
1	Barcelona	11	9	1	1	42	6	+36	28	Qualification for the Champions League league phase
2	Real Madrid	11	7	3	1	26	21	+5	24	Qualification for the Champions League league phase
3	Atlético Madrid	11	7	1	3	24	13	+11	22	Qualification for the Champions League third qualifying round
4	Athletic Club	11	5	4	2	17	12	+5	19	
5	Tenerife	10	5	2	3	17	15	+2	17	
6	Madrid CFF	11	5	2	4	18	24	−6	17	
7	Espanyol	11	4	3	4	15	14	+1	15	
8	Logroño United	11	4	1	6	14	16	−2	13	
9	Real Sociedad	11	3	4	4	14	19	−5	13	
10	Deportivo Abanca	11	3	3	5	12	14	−2	12	
11	Eibar	11	3	3	5	11	15	−4	12	
12	Granada	11	3	3	5	9	16	−7	12	
13	Alavés	10	3	2	5	8	14	−6	11	
14	Sevilla	11	2	4	5	12	18	−6	10	
15	Badalona Women	11	2	3	6	12	23	−11	9	Relegation to Primera Federación
16	Valencia	11	2	1	8	8	19	−11	7	Relegation to Primera Federación

Updated to match(es) played on 15 November 2026. Source: LigaF.es
Rules for classification: 1) Points; 2) Head-to-head points; 3) Goal difference; 4) Number of goals scored

==== Primera Federación ====
Pos	Team	Pld	W	D	L	GF	GA	GD	Pts	Promotion, qualification or relegation
1	Levante	7	6	0	1	23	11	+12	18	Promotion to Liga F
2	Alhama	8	5	1	2	12	6	+6	16	Qualification for Promotion play-offs
3	Villarreal	8	4	2	2	11	7	+4	14	Qualification for Promotion play-offs
4	Cacereño	8	4	1	3	10	9	+1	13	Qualification for Promotion play-offs
5	Atlético Madrid B (Note: Reserve team, ineligible for promotion)	8	4	1	3	18	20	−2	13	Qualification for Promotion play-offs
6	Athletic Club B	8	3	3	2	9	10	−1	12	
7	Sport Extremadura	8	3	3	2	7	11	−4	12	
8	Barcelona B	8	3	2	3	17	14	+3	11	
9	RU Tenerife	8	3	2	3	11	12	−1	11	
10	Osasuna	7	2	4	1	13	7	+6	10	
11	Albacete	8	2	0	6	10	12	−2	6	
12	Tenerife B	5	1	1	3	5	9	−4	4	
13	Real Sociedad B	7	1	1	5	4	12	−8	4	
14	Real Madrid B	8	0	3	5	12	22	−10	3	Relegation to Segunda Federación

Updated to match(es) played on 15 November 2026. Source: RFEF
Rules for classification: 1) Points; 2) Head-to-head points; 3) Goal difference; 4) Number of goals scored
