= 2026–27 UEFA Youth League Domestic Champions Path =

Part of football competition

The 2026–27 UEFA Youth League Domestic Champions Path will begin on 16 September and end on 9 December 2026. A total of 50 teams will compete in the Domestic Champions Path to decide 10 of the 32 places in the knockout phase of the 2026–27 UEFA Youth League.

Times are CET or CEST, (Note: CEST (UTC+2) for dates up to 25 October 2026, and CET (UTC+1) for dates thereafter.) as listed by UEFA (local times, if different, are in parentheses).

== Format ==
In the Domestic Champions Path, each tie will be played over two legs, with each team playing one leg at home. The team that scores more goals on aggregate over the two legs advances to the next round. If the aggregate score is level, as the away goals rule has been scrapped, the match will be decided by a penalty shoot-out with no extra time played.

The ten third round winners will advance to the knockout phase, where they will be joined by the 22 best-ranked teams from the UEFA Champions League Path.

== Round and draw dates ==
The schedule of the competition is as follows.

- For the Domestic Champions Path first and second rounds, in principle matches were played on Wednesdays (first round on matchdays 2 and 3, second round on matchdays 4 and 5, as scheduled for UEFA Champions League); however, matches could also be played on other dates, including Mondays, Tuesdays and Thursdays.

Schedule for 2026–27 UEFA Youth League
Phase	Round	Draw date	First leg	Second leg
Domestic; Champions Path	First round	1 September 2026	16 September 2026	4 October 2026
Domestic; Champions Path	Second round	1 September 2026	28 October 2026	4 November 2026
Domestic; Champions Path	Third round	1 September 2026	25 November 2026	9 December 2026

== Teams ==
The Domestic Champions Path includes 50 youth domestic champions (or runners-up, if the champions qualified for the UEFA Champions League Path) and consists of the following rounds:

- First round (20 teams): 20 teams from the 20 lower-ranked member associations according to their 2026 UEFA country coefficients.
- Second round (40 teams): 30 teams from the top 30 member associations according to UEFA country coefficients, and 10 winners of the first round.
- Third round (20 teams): 20 winners of the second round.

Below are the participating teams of the Domestic Champions Path, grouped by their starting rounds.

Key to colours
Winners of third round advanced to knockout phase
Teams eliminated

Second round Team (England) Chelsea (Italy) Fiorentina (Germany) TSG Hoffenheim (France) Clermont (Netherlands) AZ (Portugal) Benfica (Belgium) Genk (Czech Republic) Hradec Králové (Turkey) Göztepe (Norway) Stabæk (Greece) PAOK (Austria) Red Bull Salzburg (Scotland) Rangers (Poland) Legia Warsaw (Denmark) Copenhagen (Switzerland) Zürich (Israel) Maccabi Tel Aviv (Cyprus) Pafos (Sweden) Hammarby (Croatia) Dinamo Zagreb (Serbia) Red Star Belgrade (Ukraine) Dynamo Kyiv (Hungary) MTK Budapest (Romania) Farul Constanța (Slovakia) Žilina (Slovenia) Bravo (Bulgaria) Septemvri Sofia (Azerbaijan) Qarabağ (Republic of Ireland) St Patrick's Athletic (Moldova) Sheriff Tiraspol	First round Team (Iceland) Þór Akureyri (Latvia) Super Nova (Bosnia and Herzegovina) Zrinjski Mostar (Kosovo) Ballkani (Finland) HJK (Kazakhstan) Kairat (Faroe Islands) HB (Malta) Valletta (Northern Ireland) Cliftonville (Lithuania) Žalgiris (Estonia) Flora (Albania) Partizani (Montenegro) Mladost Donja Gorica (Luxembourg) UNA Strassen (Wales) Cardiff Met (Georgia (country)) Dinamo Tbilisi (North Macedonia) AP Brera Strumica (Belarus) Dinamo Minsk (Andorra) FC Santa Coloma (Gibraltar) Lincoln Red Imps

== First round ==
=== Draw ===
The draw for the first round was held on 1 September 2026.

Group 1	Group 2	Group 3	Group 4
(Iceland) Þór Akureyri; (Faroe Islands) HB; (Lithuania) Žalgiris; (Estonia) Flora	(Latvia) Super Nova; (Kosovo) Ballkani; (Finland) HJK; (Northern Ireland) Cliftonville; (Luxembourg) UNA Strassen; (Wales) Cardiff Met	(Kazakhstan) Kairat; (Malta) Valletta; (Albania) Partizani; (Montenegro) Mladost Donja Gorica; (Georgia (country)) Dinamo Tbilisi; (Belarus) Dinamo Minsk	(Bosnia and Herzegovina) Zrinjski Mostar; (North Macedonia) AP Brera Strumica; (Andorra) FC Santa Coloma; (Gibraltar) Lincoln Red Imps

=== Summary ===
The first legs will be played on 16 September and the second legs on 14 October 2026.

The winners of the ties will advance to the second round.

First round
Team 1	Agg.	Team 2	1st leg	2nd leg
Flora (Estonia)	7–1	(Faroe Islands) HB	3–0	4–1
Þór Akureyri (Iceland)	3–6	(Lithuania) Žalgiris	3–4	0–2
Cliftonville (Northern Ireland)	0–1	(Latvia) Super Nova	0–0	0–1
HJK (Finland)	8–1	(Kosovo) Ballkani	6–0	2–1
Cardiff Met (Wales)	4–1	(Luxembourg) UNA Strassen	4–0	0–1
Valletta (Malta)	0–6	(Albania) Partizani	0–2	0–4
Mladost Donja Gorica (Montenegro)	1–13	(Kazakhstan) Kairat	0–5	1–8
Dinamo Tbilisi (Georgia (country))	6–6 (3–1 p)	(Belarus) Dinamo Minsk	3–4	3–2
FC Santa Coloma (Andorra)	0–11	(North Macedonia) AP Brera Strumica	0–3	0–8
Zrinjski Mostar (Bosnia and Herzegovina)	10–1	(Gibraltar) Lincoln Red Imps	6–0	4–1

=== Matches ===
16 September 2026
18:00 (19:00 UTC+3)

Flora (Estonia)	3–0	(Faroe Islands) HB
Sammul 25'; Lorenz 28'; Paltser 34'	Report

Lilleküla Stadium, Tallinn
Attendance: 352
Referee: Dovydas Švėgžda (Lithuania)
14 October 2026
20:00 (19:00 UTC+1)

HB (Faroe Islands)	1–4	(Estonia) Flora
Reynheim 73'	Report	Pihlak 22'; Kukkonen 59'; Põldma 89', 78'

Tórsvøllur, Tórshavn
Attendance: 106
Referee: Matthew MacDermid (Scotland)

Flora won 7–1 on aggregate.

16 September 2026
18:00 (16:00 UTC+0)

Þór Akureyri (Iceland)	3–4	(Lithuania) Žalgiris
Bjarnason 26'; Svavarsson 74'; Sveinsson 76'	Report	Berenta 1', 38', 77'; Eidukaitis 24'

Þórsvöllur, Akureyri
Attendance: 245
Referee: Ross Hardie (Scotland)
14 October 2026
18:00 (19:00 UTC+3)

Žalgiris (Lithuania)	2–0	(Iceland) Þór Akureyri
Berenta 43'; Braškys 78'	Report

LFF Stadium, Vilnius
Attendance: 595
Referee: Aaron O’Dowd (Republic of Ireland)

Zalgiris won 6–3 on aggregate.

16 September 2026
20:45 (19:45 UTC+1)

Cliftonville (Northern Ireland)	0–0	(Latvia) Super Nova
	Report

Solitude, Belfast
Attendance: 454
Referee: Dominik Starý (Czech Republic)
14 October 2026
17:00 (18:00 UTC+3)

Super Nova (Latvia)	1–0	(Northern Ireland) Cliftonville
Bombāns 4' (pen.)	Report

Jānis Skredelis' Stadium, Riga
Attendance: 344
Referee: Igor Bosca (Moldova)

Super Nova won 1–0 on aggregate.

16 September 2026
18:00

HJK (Finland)	6–0	(Kosovo) Ballkani
Haikala 17', 50', 53'; Kroupkin 37'; De Nascimento 56'; Zaitra 83'	Report

Helsinki Football Stadium, Helsinki
Attendance: 551
Referee: Oscar Johnson (Sweden)
14 October 2026
14:00

Ballkani (Kosovo)	1–2	(Finland) HJK
Osmanollaj 21'	Report	Zabërxha 17' (pen.); Barret 45'

Kampi Nacional Hajvalia, Hajvalia
Attendance: 120
Referee: Jóhan Hendrik Ellefsen (Faroe Islands)

HJK won 8–1 on aggregate.

16 September 2026
20:45 (19:45 UTC+1)

Cardiff Met (Wales)	4–0	(Luxembourg) UNA Strassen
Ford 38'; Matthews 44' (pen.); Finlayson 63'; Mckenzie 81'	Report

Cyncoed Stadium, Cardiff
Attendance: 812
Referee: Andreu Simarro (Andorra)
14 October 2026
19:30

UNA Strassen (Luxembourg)	1–0	(Wales) Cardiff Met
Ibisi 66'	Report

Stade An de Millewisen, Strassen
Attendance: 517
Referee: Vasil Minev (Bulgaria)

Cardiff Met won 4–1 on aggregate.

16 September 2026
20:00

Valletta (Malta)	0–2	(Albania) Partizani
	Report	Rrenga 63'; Hyka 69'

Centenary Stadium, Ta' Qali
Attendance: 395
Referee: Sven Wolfensberger (Switzerland)
14 October 2026
14:00

Partizani (Albania)	4–0	(Malta) Valletta
Lleshaj 43'; Formosa 45+1' (o.g.); Rrenga 53'; Hyseni 68'	Report

House of Football Natural Pitch, Tirana
Attendance: 350
Referee: Anton Lashuk (Belarus)

Partizani won 6–0 on aggregate

15 September 2026
16:00

Mladost Donja Gorica (Montenegro)	0–5	(Kazakhstan) Kairat
	Report	Chernomorets 35'; Kalikulov 41'; Kerimkhan 43'; Zhilkaidar 72'; Nurbolat 90+2'

DG Arena, Podgorica
Attendance: 200
Referee: Robin Hensgens (Netherlands)
14 October 2026
12:00 (15:00 UTC+5)

Kairat (Kazakhstan)	8–1	(Montenegro) Mladost Donja Gorica
Ismagulov 5'; Orynbassar 28' (pen.); Trubin 37'; Nikočević 42' (o.g.); Tashpulatov 76'; Toleukhan 79'; Yerkin 88' (pen.); Zhilkaidar 90+1'	Report	Pantić 70'

FC Kairat Academy, Almaty
Attendance: 187
Referee: Arnes Talic (Austria)

Kairat won 13–1 on aggregate

10 October 2026
19:00 (21:00 UTC+4)

Dinamo Tbilisi (Georgia (country))	3–4	(Belarus) Dinamo Minsk
Diakonidze 25'; Aduashvili 40'; Khoperia 90'	Report	Voronin 11'; Kibak 22'; Chumak 34'; Leontyuk 78' (pen.)

Boris Paichadze Dinamo Arena, Tbilisi
Attendance: 2,500
Referee: Mateo Erceg (Croatia)
14 October 2026
14:00 (16:00 UTC+4)

Dinamo Minsk (Belarus)	2–3	(Georgia (country)) Dinamo Tbilisi
Lutskovich 62' (pen.), 72'	Report	Aduashvili 12'; Lomidze 33'; Aleksidze 46'
Penalties
Degtyarenko (penalty scored); Leantsiuk (penalty missed); Varonin (penalty missed); Lutskovich (penalty missed)	1–3	(penalty scored) Sharikadze; (penalty scored) Metreveli; (penalty scored) Kurdovanidze

Boris Paichadze Dinamo Arena, Tbilisi, Georgia (Note: Due to the country's involvement in the Russian invasion of Ukraine, Belarusian teams were required to play their home matches at neutral venues and behind closed doors until further notice.)
Attendance: 0
Referee: Antoine Chiaramonti (Andorra)

6–6 on aggregate; Dinamo Tbilisi won 3–1 on penalties.

16 September 2026
18:00

FC Santa Coloma (Andorra)	0–3	(North Macedonia) AP Brera Strumica
	Report	Buchkov 57', 80'; Kuleski 87'

Estadi Nacional, Andorra la Vella
Attendance: 320
Referee: Loic Thomas (Luxembourg)
14 October 2026
15:00

AP Brera Strumica (North Macedonia)	8–0	(Andorra) FC Santa Coloma
Sejmenov 11'; Shirikj 19', 31', 50'; Vasilev 30'; Ristov 36'; Trenov 86'; Kuleski 88'	Report

Goran Pandev Training Complex, Strumica
Attendance: 400
Referee: Artem Gasparyan (Armenia)

AP Brera Strumica won 11–0 on aggregate

16 September 2026
18:00

Zrinjski Mostar (Bosnia and Herzegovina)	6–0	(Gibraltar) Lincoln Red Imps
Arapović 18', 31', 54', 55'; Šunjić 40', 68' (pen.)	Report

Stadion pod Bijelim Brijegom, Mostar
Attendance: 500
Referee: Karl Koppel (Estonia)
13 October 2026
18:00

Lincoln Red Imps (Gibraltar)	1–4	(Bosnia and Herzegovina) Zrinjski Mostar
Poggio 5'	Report	Šunjić 10'; Rodríguez Zentner 18'; Vujović 54'; Arapović 82' (pen.)

Europa Sports Park, Gibraltar
Attendance: 487
Referee: Vilius Paulauskas (Lithuania)

Zrinjski Mostar won 10–1 on aggregate.

== Second round ==
The draw for the second round was held on 1 September 2026.

Group 1	Group 2	Group 3	Group 4
(England) Chelsea; (Belgium) Genk; (Austria) Red Bull Salzburg; (Scotland) Rangers; (Serbia) Red Star Belgrade; (Ukraine) Dynamo Kyiv; (Slovenia) Bravo; (Republic of Ireland) St Patrick's Athletic	(France) Clermont; (Netherlands) AZ; (Turkey) Göztepe; (Norway) Stabæk; (Poland) Legia Warsaw; (Sweden) Hammarby; (Slovakia) Žilina	(Italy) Fiorentina; (Czech Republic) Hradec Králové; (Denmark) Copenhagen; (Croatia) Dinamo Zagreb; (Hungary) MTK Budapest; (Bulgaria) Septemvri Sofia; (Azerbaijan) Qarabağ	(Germany) TSG Hoffenheim; (Portugal) Benfica; (Greece) PAOK; (Switzerland) Zürich; (Israel) Maccabi Tel Aviv; (Cyprus) Pafos; (Romania) Farul Constanța; (Moldova) Sheriff Tiraspol

=== Summary ===
The winners of the ties advanced to the third round.

Second round
Team 1	Agg.	Team 2	1st leg	2nd leg
Flora (Estonia)	5–4	(England) Chelsea	2–2	3–2
St Patrick's Athletic (Republic of Ireland)	2–1	(Lithuania) Žalgiris	1–1	1–0
Genk (Belgium)	4–5	(Austria) Red Bull Salzburg	1–1	3–4
Bravo (Slovenia)	0–2	(Serbia) Red Star Belgrade	0–1	0–1
Dynamo Kyiv (Ukraine)	3–5	(Scotland) Rangers	3–2	0–3
AZ (Netherlands)	5–2	(Turkey) Göztepe	3–1	2–1
Legia Warsaw (Poland)	5–2	(France) Clermont	3–1	2–1
Hammarby (Sweden)	1–2	(Latvia) Super Nova	1–0	0–2
HJK (Finland)	3–0	(Slovakia) Žilina	3–0	0–0
Stabæk (Norway)	12–0	(Wales) Cardiff Met	8–0	4–0
Partizani (Albania)	0–9	(Czech Republic) Hradec Králové	0–6	0–3
MTK Budapest (Hungary)	3–5	(Kazakhstan) Kairat	1–3	2–2
Dinamo Tbilisi (Georgia (country))	3–3 (5–4 p)	(Denmark) Copenhagen	3–0	0–3
Fiorentina (Italy)	8–0	(Bulgaria) Septemvri Sofia	5–0	3–0
Qarabağ (Azerbaijan)	1–9	(Croatia) Dinamo Zagreb	1–2	0–7
Benfica (Portugal)	9–1	(Cyprus) Pafos	6–0	3–1
Farul Constanța (Romania)	3–3 (6–7 p)	(Moldova) Sheriff Tiraspol	2–0	1–3
Zürich (Switzerland)	1–1 (3–5 p)	(Israel) Maccabi Tel Aviv	1–1	0–0
AP Brera Strumica (North Macedonia)	0–12	(Germany) TSG Hoffenheim	0–3	0–9
Zrinjski Mostar (Bosnia and Herzegovina)	1–6	(Greece) PAOK	1–3	0–3

=== Matches ===
28 October 2026
19:00

Flora (Estonia)	2–2	(England) Chelsea
Alamaa 5', 60' (pen.)	Report	Greenwood 18'; Ezenwata 40'

Lilleküla Stadium, Tallinn
Attendance: 2,745
Referee: Aleko Aptsiauri (Georgia)
4 November 2026
13:00

Chelsea (England)	2–3	(Estonia) Flora
Eboué 2'; Rabbaj 47'	Report	Alamaa 17', 78' (pen.); Kukkonen 54'

Chelsea Football Club Training Ground, Surrey
Attendance: 280
Referee: David Dickinson (Scotland)

Flora won 5–4 on aggregate.

28 October 2026
21:30

St Patrick's Athletic (Republic of Ireland)	1–1	(Lithuania) Žalgiris
Ogungbe 86'	Report	Berenta 56'

Richmond Park, Dublin
Attendance: 856
Referee: Benjamin Brand (Germany)
4 November 2026
18:00

Žalgiris (Lithuania)	0–1	(Republic of Ireland) St Patrick's Athletic
	Report	Sullivan 28'

FK Žalgiris Stadium, Vilnius
Attendance: 683
Referee: Klym Zabroda (Ukraine)

St Patrick's Athletic won 2–1 on aggregate.

28 October 2026
16:00

Genk (Belgium)	1–1	(Austria) Red Bull Salzburg
Moorthamer 56'	Report	Grudzinskas 15'

KRC Genk Arena - Stadium B, Genk
Attendance: 563
Referee: Mikkel Redder (Denmark)
3 November 2026
14:00

Red Bull Salzburg (Austria)	4–3	(Belgium) Genk
Matjašec 4', 37'; Ivanschitz 51'; Onwuzulike 70'	Report	Fernandez 21' (pen.); Kapers 83'; Balde 90'

Akademie Salzburg, Liefering
Attendance: 297
Referee: Danilo Nikolić (Serbia)

Red Bull Salzburg won 5–4 on aggregate.

28 October 2026
19:00

Bravo (Slovenia)	0–1	(Serbia) Red Star Belgrade
	Report	Wan Xiang 2'

Športni center Kranj, Kranj
Attendance: 1,080
Referee: Ashot Ghaltakhchyan (Armenia)
4 November 2026
14:00

Red Star Belgrade (Serbia)	1–0	(Slovenia) Bravo
Trpevski 16'	Report

Stadium Rajko Mitić - Youth stadium, Belgrade
Attendance: 273
Referee: Ihar Shumilau (Belarus)

Red Star Belgrade won 2–0 on aggregate.

28 October 2026
14:00

Dynamo Kyiv (Ukraine)	3–2	(Scotland) Rangers
Liusin 3'; Fedorenko 45+2'; Buravtsov 80'	Report	Glasgow 78'; Fergusson 90+4'

Stal Stalowa Wola Stadium, Stalowa Wola, Poland (Note: Due to the Russian invasion of Ukraine, Ukrainian teams were required to play their home matches at neutral venues until further notice.)
Attendance: 50
Referee: Simon Bourdeaud'hui (Belgium)
4 November 2026
20:00

Rangers (Scotland)	3–0	(Ukraine) Dynamo Kyiv
Stewart 16'; Glasgow 62'; Cameron 73'	Report

Forthbank Stadium, Stirling
Attendance: 567
Referee: Anojen Kanagasingam (Switzerland)

Rangers won 5–3 on aggregate.

27 October 2026
19:00

AZ (Netherlands)	3–1	(Turkey) Göztepe
Hellings 44', 78' (pen.); Ampofo 90'	Report	Şirin 25' (pen.)

AZ Training Centre, Wijdewormer
Attendance: 550
Referee: Andreu Simarro (Andorra)
3 November 2026
18:00

Göztepe (Turkey)	1–2	(Netherlands) AZ
Doğu 12'	Report	Ouaziz 28'; Natali 75'

Bornova Stadyumu, İzmir
Attendance: 1,800
Referee: Szabolcs Kovacs (Romania)

AZ won 5–2 on aggregate.

28 October 2026
12:00

Legia Warsaw (Poland)	3–1	(France) Clermont
Piasta 17', 54'; Etchemendigaray 30'	Report	Gharibian 85'

Legia Training Center, Książenice
Attendance: 200
Referee: Oscar Johnson (Sweden)
4 November 2026
19:00

Clermont (France)	1–2	(Poland) Legia Warsaw
Tard 20'	Report	Piasta 52'; Brzeziński 90+1'

Stade Gabriel-Montpied, Clermont-Ferrand
Attendance: 3,385
Referee: David Rafael Oliveira Da Silva (Portugal)

Legia Warsaw won 5–2 on aggregate.

28 October 2026
20:00

Hammarby (Sweden)	1–0	(Latvia) Super Nova
Ramos 73'	Report

Hammarby IP, Stockholm
Attendance: 414
Referee: Ryan Lee (Scotland)
4 November 2026
17:00

Super Nova (Latvia)	2–0	(Sweden) Hammarby
Streļcovs 73'; Bombāns 82'	Report

SB Arkadija, Riga
Attendance: 264
Referee: Márton Rúsz (Hungary)

Super Nova won 2–1 on aggregate.

28 October 2026
19:00

HJK (Finland)	3–0	(Slovakia) Žilina
Siren 15'; Barret 18'; Haikala 55'	Report

Helsinki Football Stadium, Helsinki
Attendance: 658
Referee: Michele Beltrano (San Marino)
4 November 2026
16:30

Žilina (Slovakia)	0–0	(Finland) HJK
	Report

Štadión MŠK Žilina, Žilina
Attendance: 1,877
Referee: Bastien Dechepy (France)

HJK won 3–0 on aggregate.

28 October 2026
19:00

Stabæk (Norway)	8–0	(Wales) Cardiff Met
Ferrington 13', 34' (pen.), 45+1', 51'; Hytterød 16', 69'; Aamodt 26'; Kastrati 85' (pen.)	Report

Nye Nadderud stadion, Bekkestua
Attendance: 744
Referee: Anton Lashuk (Belarus)
4 November 2026
20:45

Cardiff Met (Wales)	0–4	(Norway) Stabæk
	Report	Varvin-Kvamme 14'; Ferrington 33'; Knox 46'; Hytterød 69'

Cyncoed Stadium, Cardiff
Attendance: 575
Referee: Dominik Starý (Czech Republic)

Stabæk won 12–0 on aggregate.

28 October 2026
15:00

Partizani (Albania)	0–6	(Czech Republic) Hradec Králové
	Report	Matuška 45+1'; Fejgl 64'; Halama 68'; Ponikelský 76'; Ayomide 84', 90'

House of Football Natural Pitch, Tirana
Attendance: 250
Referee: Patryk Gryckiewicz (Poland)
4 November 2026
17:30

Hradec Králové (Czech Republic)	3–0	(Albania) Partizani
Vaněk 57'; Ayomide 70'; Thiele 90+2'	Report

Malsovicka Arena, Hradec Kralove
Attendance: 2,282
Referee: Alex Johnson (Malta)

Hradec Králové won 9–0 on aggregate.

28 October 2026
19:00

MTK Budapest (Hungary)	1–3	(Kazakhstan) Kairat
Varga 87'	Report	Tashpulatov 52'; Toleukhan 79'; Kenesbekov 55'

Új Hidegkuti Nándor Stadium, Budapest
Attendance: 925
Referee: Jérémy Muller (Luxembourg)
4 November 2026
10:00

Kairat (Kazakhstan)	2–2	(Hungary) MTK Budapest
Tashpulatov 52'; Malayev 57'	Report	Molnár 81'; Onder 83'

FC Kairat Academy, Almaty
Attendance: 200
Referee: Tural Kurbanov (Azerbaijan)

Kairat won 5–3 on aggregate.

28 October 2026
17:00

Dinamo Tbilisi (Georgia (country))	3–0	(Denmark) Copenhagen
Kvaratskhelia 4', 51'; Mikautadze 26'	Report

Dinamo Arena, Tbilisi
Attendance: 1,400
Referee: Matteo Marchetti (Italy)
4 November 2026
14:00

Copenhagen (Denmark)	3–0	(Georgia (country)) Dinamo Tbilisi
Odefalk 3', 38'; Mehicic 71'	Report
Penalties
Mehicic (penalty scored); Santos (penalty scored); Odefalk (penalty scored); Madsen (penalty scored); Haraldsen (penalty missed)	4–5	(penalty scored) Sharikadze; (penalty scored) Kakashvili; (penalty scored) Kurdovanidze; (penalty scored) Kobzonadze; (penalty scored) Gogua

Valby Idrætspark, Copenhagen
Attendance: 242
Referee: Alexandros Tsakalidis (Greece)

3–3 on aggregate; Dinamo Tbilisi won 5–4 on penalties.

28 October 2026
15:30

Fiorentina (Italy)	5–0	(Bulgaria) Septemvri Sofia
Croci 7'; Forte 13', 40', 45', 46'	Report

Curva Fiesole, Florence
Attendance: 531
Referee: Luka Bilbija (Bosnia and Herzegovina)
4 November 2026
11:30

Septemvri Sofia (Bulgaria)	0–3	(Italy) Fiorentina
	Report	Bošković 40'; Kanev 65' (o.g.); Angeloni 72'

Stadion Dragalevtsi, Sofia
Attendance: 950
Referee: Vilius Paulauskas (Lithuania)

Fiorentina won 8–0 on aggregate.

28 October 2026
13:30

Qarabağ (Azerbaijan)	1–2	(Croatia) Dinamo Zagreb
Chidioke 45' (pen.)	Report	Benkotić 68'; Ban 90'

Qarabagh Stadium, Baku
Attendance: 287
Referee: Karl Koppel (Estonia)
4 November 2026
13:00

Dinamo Zagreb (Croatia)	7–0	(Azerbaijan) Qarabağ
Benkotić 24'; Trupčević 34'; Bozhkov 38', 45+3'; Ban 45+1'; Teymurov 54' (o.g.); Radić 76'	Report

Stadion Ivan Laljak-Ivić, Zaprešić
Attendance: 150
Referee: Loïc Thomas (Luxembourg)

Dinamo Zagreb won 9–1 on aggregate.

28 October 2026
18:00

Benfica (Portugal)	6–0	(Cyprus) Pafos
Ferreirinha 56', 66'; Silva 58', 78', 87'; Soares 71'	Report

Futebol Campus, Seixal
Attendance: 369
Referee: Helgi Mikael Jónasson (Iceland)
4 November 2026
13:00

Pafos (Cyprus)	1–3	(Portugal) Benfica
Kypri 85'	Report	Soares 15'; Silva 28'; Manuel 64'

Stelios Kyriakides Stadium, Paphos
Attendance: 114
Referee: Aaron O’Dowd (Republic of Ireland)

Benfica won 9–1 on aggregate.

28 October 2026
15:00

Farul Constanța (Romania)	2–0	(Moldova) Sheriff Tiraspol
Berchez 26'; Oancea 90+2' (pen.)	Report

Central Stadium Hagi Academy, Ovidiu
Attendance: 739
Referee: Mervan Bejtullahu (Kosovo)
4 November 2026
17:00

Sheriff Tiraspol (Moldova)	3–1	(Romania) Farul Constanța
Ivanov 40', 78'; Cecetchin 72'	Report	Oancea 7' (pen.)
Penalties
Jeju (penalty scored); Burca (penalty scored); Ivanov (penalty missed); Fenin (penalty scored); Pavlenco (penalty scored); Agatiev (penalty scored); Cecetchin (penalty scored); Sorochin (penalty missed); Prodius (penalty scored)	7–6	(penalty missed) Tripon; (penalty scored) Dragomir; (penalty scored) Sifiringa; (penalty scored) Oancea; (penalty scored) Podoleanu; (penalty scored) Carabas; (penalty scored) Oglindă; (penalty missed) Rezmives; (penalty missed) Plugaru

Sheriff Small Arena, Tiraspol
Attendance: 700
Referee: Antoine Chiaramonti (Andorra)

3–3 on aggregate; Sheriff Tiraspol won 7–6 on penalties.

28 October 2026
20:00

Zürich (Switzerland)	1–1	(Israel) Maccabi Tel Aviv
Kingsley 89'	Report	Yossef 78'

Letzigrund, Zurich
Attendance: 2,196
Referee: Karel Rouček (Czech Republic)
3 November 2026
16:30

Maccabi Tel Aviv (Israel)	0–0	(Switzerland) Zürich
	Report
Penalties
Ginat (penalty scored); Lavi (penalty scored); Yossef (penalty scored); Simon (penalty scored); Gafni (penalty scored)	5–3	(penalty scored) Steil; (penalty missed) Zaier; (penalty scored) Sekulic; (penalty scored) Ikezu

Gyirmóti Stadion, Győr, Hungary (Note: Due to the Gaza war, Israeli teams are required to play their home matches at neutral venues until further notice.)
Referee: Bulat Sariyev (Kazakhstan)

1–1 on aggregate; Maccabi Tel Aviv won 5–3 on penalties.

28 October 2026
15:00

AP Brera Strumica (North Macedonia)	0–3	(Germany) TSG Hoffenheim
	Report	Čížek 10'; Kramer 11'; Creta 18'

Stadion Mladost, Strumica
Attendance: 400
Referee: Kevin O'Sullivan (Republic of Ireland)
4 November 2026
18:00

TSG Hoffenheim (Germany)	9–0	(North Macedonia) AP Brera Strumica
Creta 5'; Kramer 12', 27'; Dügdü 42'; Bruegmann 54'; Haßfeld 59', 63'; Meeß 83'; Poyatos 86'	Report

Dietmar-Hopp-Stadion, Hoffenheim
Attendance: 420
Referee: Snir Levy (Israel)

TSG Hoffenheim won 12–0 on aggregate.

28 October 2026
17:00

Zrinjski Mostar (Bosnia and Herzegovina)	1–3	(Greece) PAOK
Šunjić 3'	Report	Souvlatzis 5'; Berdos 10'; Aretis 53'

Stadium of HŠK Zrinjski, Mostar
Attendance: 500
Referee: Yura Mahtesyan (Armenia)
4 November 2026
14:30

PAOK (Greece)	3–0	(Bosnia and Herzegovina) Zrinjski Mostar
Berdos 6'; Aretis 52'; Matera 81'	Report

Toumba Stadium, Thessaloniki
Attendance: 800
Referee: Mateo Busquets Ferrer (Spain)

PAOK won 6–1 on aggregate.

== Third round ==
=== Summary ===
The winners of the ties advanced to the knockout phase.

Third round
Team 1	Agg.	Team 2	1st leg	2nd leg
Flora (Estonia)	Match 1	(Republic of Ireland) St Patrick's Athletic	25 Nov	9 Dec
Red Bull Salzburg (Austria)	Match 2	(Serbia) Red Star Belgrade	25 Nov	9 Dec
Rangers (Scotland)	Match 3	(Netherlands) AZ	25 Nov	9 Dec
Legia Warsaw (Poland)	Match 4	(Latvia) Super Nova	25 Nov	9 Dec
HJK (Finland)	Match 5	(Norway) Stabæk	25 Nov	9 Dec
Hradec Králové (Czech Republic)	Match 6	(Kazakhstan) Kairat	25 Nov	9 Dec
Dinamo Tbilisi (Georgia (country))	Match 7	(Italy) Fiorentina	25 Nov	9 Dec
Dinamo Zagreb (Croatia)	Match 8	(Portugal) Benfica	25 Nov	9 Dec
Sheriff Tiraspol (Moldova)	Match 9	(Israel) Maccabi Tel Aviv	25 Nov	9 Dec
TSG Hoffenheim (Germany)	Match 10	(Greece) PAOK	25 Nov	9 Dec

=== Matches ===
25 November 2026

Flora (Estonia)	v	(Republic of Ireland) St Patrick's Athletic
	Report

9 December 2026

St Patrick's Athletic (Republic of Ireland)	v	(Estonia) Flora
	Report

25 November 2026

Red Bull Salzburg (Austria)	v	(Serbia) Red Star Belgrade
	Report

9 December 2026

Red Star Belgrade (Serbia)	v	(Austria) Red Bull Salzburg
	Report

25 November 2026

Rangers (Scotland)	v	(Netherlands) AZ
	Report

9 December 2026

AZ (Netherlands)	v	(Scotland) Rangers
	Report

25 November 2026

Legia Warsaw (Poland)	v	(Latvia) Super Nova
	Report

9 December 2026

Super Nova (Latvia)	v	(Poland) Legia Warsaw
	Report

25 November 2026

HJK (Finland)	v	(Norway) Stabæk
	Report

9 December 2026

Stabæk (Norway)	v	(Finland) HJK
	Report

25 November 2026

Hradec Králové (Czech Republic)	v	(Kazakhstan) Kairat
	Report

9 December 2026

Kairat (Kazakhstan)	v	(Czech Republic) Hradec Králové
	Report

25 November 2026

Dinamo Tbilisi (Georgia (country))	v	(Italy) Fiorentina
	Report

9 December 2026

Fiorentina (Italy)	v	(Georgia (country)) Dinamo Tbilisi
	Report

25 November 2026

Dinamo Zagreb (Croatia)	v	(Portugal) Benfica
	Report

9 December 2026

Benfica (Portugal)	v	(Croatia) Dinamo Zagreb
	Report

25 November 2026

Sheriff Tiraspol (Moldova)	v	(Israel) Maccabi Tel Aviv
	Report

9 December 2026

Maccabi Tel Aviv (Israel)	v	(Moldova) Sheriff Tiraspol
	Report

25 November 2026

TSG Hoffenheim (Germany)	v	(Greece) PAOK
	Report

9 December 2026

PAOK (Greece)	v	(Germany) TSG Hoffenheim
	Report
