= Joshua Abe =

English footballer (born 2010)

Josh Abe
Personal information
- Full name: Joshua Abe
- Date of birth: 17 July 2010 (age 16)
- Place of birth: Warrington, England
- Position: Right winger

Team information
- Current team: Liverpool
- Number: 40

Youth career
- 2015–: Liverpool

International career
Years	Team	Apps	(Gls)
2025	England U15	6	(1)
2025–2026	England U16	8	(4)

Joshua Abe (born 17 July 2010) is an English footballer who plays as a right winger in the youth academy of Premier League club Liverpool.

== Club career ==
From Warrington, Abe joined the pre-academy at Liverpool at the age of four years-old. As a 15 year-old in February 2026, Abe made his debut for Liverpool 19s in the UEFA Youth League against MSK Zilina. That month, he scored his first hat-trick for Liverpool Under-18s in a 6-1 win against Leeds United. During the 2025–26 season, he also trained for the first time with the Liverpool first-team under head coach Arne Slot.

== Style of play ==
Abe is a left-footed wide player. He has been compared in style to former Liverpool player Sadio Mané.

== International career ==
Abe scored in his first three appearances for the England under-16s during the 2025–26 season.
