= 2026–27 UEFA Youth League =

Tournament details
- Dates: 8 September 2026 – 19 April 2027
- Teams: 86 (from 50 associations)

Tournament statistics
- Matches played: 18
- Goals scored: 70 (3.89 per match)
- Attendance: 9,081 (505 per match)

The 2026–27 UEFA Youth League is the thirteenth season of the UEFA Youth League, a European youth club football competition organised by UEFA.

The title holders are Real Madrid, who defeated Club Brugge 4–2 on penalties after a 1–1 draw in the previous edition's final.

== Teams ==
A total of 86 teams from 50 of the 55 UEFA member associations entered the tournament. They were split into two sections.

- UEFA Champions League Path: The youth teams of the 36 clubs which qualified for the 2026–27 UEFA Champions League league phase entered the UEFA Champions League Path. If there had been a vacancy (youth teams not entering), it would have been filled by a team defined by UEFA.
- Domestic Champions Path: The youth domestic champions of all UEFA associations entered the Domestic Champions Path, with the exception of 5 teams. (Note: Liechtenstein and San Marino do not have a youth domestic competition; Armenia did not enter; Russia were suspended from UEFA competitions; Spain had both the domestic champion and runners-up already qualify through the UEFA Champions League path) Clubs from the top 30 associations according to their 2026 UEFA country coefficients qualified for the second round, with the remaining 20 teams starting from the first round. If the youth domestic champions qualify for the UEFA Champions League path, their spot was filled by the youth domestic runners-ups; if the runners-ups also qualify for the UEFA Champions League path, the vacancy was not filled.

Qualified teams for 2025–26 UEFA Youth League
Rank	Association	Teams	
Rank	Association	UEFA Champions League Path	Domestic Champions Path
1	England	Arsenal; Manchester City; Manchester United; Liverpool; Aston Villa	Chelsea (2025–26 U18 Premier League)
2	Italy	Inter Milan; Napoli; Roma; Como	Fiorentina (2025–26 Campionato Primavera 1)
3	Spain	Barcelona; Real Madrid; Villarreal; Atlético Madrid; Real Betis	
4	Germany	Bayern Munich; Borussia Dortmund; RB Leipzig; VfB Stuttgart	TSG Hoffenheim (2025–26 U19-DFB-Nachwuchsliga)
5	France	Paris Saint-Germain; Lens; Lille	Clermont (2025–26 Championnat National U19)
6	Netherlands	PSV Eindhoven; Feyenoord	AZ (2025–26 Eredivisie U18)
7	Portugal	Porto; Sporting CP	Benfica (2025–26 Campeonato Nacional Juniores S19)
8	Belgium	Club Brugge	Genk (2025–26 Belgian U18 League)
9	Czech Republic	Slavia Prague	Hradec Králové (2025–26 Czech U19 League)
10	Turkey	Galatasaray; Fenerbahçe	Göztepe (2025–26 U19 Elit)
11	Norway	Viking; Bodø/Glimt	Stabæk (2025 Norwegian U19 Cup)
12	Greece	AEK Athens	PAOK (2025–26 Superleague Greece Superleague U19)
13	Austria	LASK	Red Bull Salzburg (2025–26 Jugendliga U18)
14	Scotland		Rangers (2025–26 Scottish U18 League)
15	Poland		Legia Warsaw (2025–26 Polish U19 Central Junior League)
16	Denmark		Copenhagen (2025–26 U19 Ligaen)
17	Switzerland		Zürich (2025–26 Swiss U18 League)
18	Israel		Maccabi Tel Aviv (2025–26 Israeli U19 Noar Premier League)
19	Cyprus		Pafos (2025–26 Cypriot U19 League)
20	Sweden		Hammarby (2025 P17 Allsvenskan)
21	Croatia		Dinamo Zagreb (2025–26 1. HNL Juniori U19)
22	Serbia		Red Star Belgrade (2025–26 Serbian U19 League)
23	Ukraine	Shakhtar Donetsk	Dynamo Kyiv (2025–26 Ukrainian Premier League Under-19)
24	Hungary		MTK Budapest (2025–26 Hungarian U19 League)
25	Romania		Farul Constanța (2025–26 Liga de Tineret)
27	Slovakia	Slovan Bratislava	Žilina (2025–26 Slovak U19 League)
28	Slovenia		Bravo (2025–26 Slovenian U19 League)
29	Bulgaria		Septemvri Sofia (2025–26 U18 BFU Cup)
30	Azerbaijan	Sabah	Qarabağ (2025–26 Azerbaijani U19 League)
31	Republic of Ireland		St Patrick's Athletic
32	Moldova		Sheriff Tiraspol
33	Iceland		Þór Akureyri
34	Bosnia and Herzegovina		Zrinjski Mostar (2025–26 Bosnia and Herzegovina U19 Junior League)
36	Latvia		Super Nova
37	Kosovo		Ballkani
38	Finland		HJK (2025 U17 B-Junior League)
39	Kazakhstan		Kairat (2025 Kazakhstan U18 League)
40	Faroe Islands		HB
41	Malta		Valletta
42	Northern Ireland		Cliftonville
43	Lithuania		Žalgiris (2025 Lithuanian Elite Youth League U18 Division)
45	Estonia		Flora
46	Albania		Partizani
47	Montenegro		Mladost Donja Gorica
48	Luxembourg		UNA Strassen
49	Wales		Cardiff Met
50	Georgia		Dinamo Tbilisi
51	North Macedonia		AP Brera Strumica
52	Belarus		Dinamo Minsk (2025 Belarusian U18 League)
53	Andorra		FC Santa Coloma
54	Gibraltar		Lincoln Red Imps

Associations without any participating teams (no teams qualified for UEFA Champions League league phase, and either with no youth domestic competition)

Rank	Association
26	Russia
35	Armenia
44	Liechtenstein
55	San Marino

Notes

1. ^{TH} Title holders.
2. ^{RU} Youth domestic runners-up playing in the Domestic Champions Path because the domestic champions qualified for the UEFA Champions League Path.
3. ^{YC} Teams playing in the UEFA Champions League Path which were also youth domestic champions.
4. ^{PO} Teams playing in the UEFA Champions League Path after their senior team qualified for the Champions League league phase via play-offs.
5. Russia (RUS): On 28 February 2022, Russian football clubs and national teams were suspended from FIFA and UEFA competitions due to the Russian invasion of Ukraine. The tables reflect Russia's ongoing suspension from UEFA competitions.

=== Distribution ===
Path	Round	Teams entering in this round	Teams advancing from the previous round
UEFA Champions League Path (36 teams)	League phase (36 teams)	36 youth teams whose senior sides qualified for the Champions League league phase	
Domestic Champions Path (50 teams)	First round (20 teams)	20 youth champions from associations 33-54 (except Armenia, Liechtenstein and San Marino)	
Domestic Champions Path (50 teams)	Second round (40 teams)	30 youth champions from associations 1-32 (except Spain and Russia)	10 winners from the first round
Domestic Champions Path (50 teams)	Third round (20 teams)		20 winners from the second round
Knockout phase (32 teams)			22 teams ranked 1-22 from the league phase (UEFA Champions League Path); 10 winners from the third round (Domestic Champions Path)

As the Youth League title holders (Real Madrid) qualified for Champions League Path via their senior side, the following changes to the default access list were made:

== Schedule ==
The schedule of the competition was as follows.

- For the UEFA Champions League Path league stage, in principle the teams played their matches on Tuesdays and Wednesdays of the matchdays as scheduled for UEFA Champions League, and on the same day as the corresponding senior teams; however, matches could also be played on other dates, including Mondays and Thursdays.
- For the Domestic Champions Path first and second rounds, in principle matches were played on Wednesdays (first round on matchdays 2 and 3, second round on matchdays 4 and 5, as scheduled for UEFA Champions League); however, matches could also be played on other dates, including Mondays, Tuesdays and Thursdays.

Schedule for 2026–27 UEFA Youth League
Phase	Round	Draw date	First leg	Second leg
UEFA Champions League Path	Matchday 1	27 August 2026	8–10 September 2026	
UEFA Champions League Path	Matchday 2	27 August 2026	13−14 October 2026	
UEFA Champions League Path	Matchday 3	27 August 2026	20–21 October 2026	
UEFA Champions League Path	Matchday 4	27 August 2026	3–4 November 2026	
UEFA Champions League Path	Matchday 5	27 August 2026	24–25 November 2026	
UEFA Champions League Path	Matchday 6	27 August 2026	8–9 December 2026	
Domestic; Champions Path	First round	1 September 2026	16 September 2026	4 October 2026
Domestic; Champions Path	Second round	1 September 2026	28 October 2026	4 November 2026
Domestic; Champions Path	Third round	1 September 2026	25 November 2026	9 December 2026
Knockout phase	Round of 32	11 December 2026	2–3 February 2027	
Knockout phase	Round of 16	5 February 2027	23–24 February 2027	
Knockout phase	Quarter-finals	—N/a	16–17 March 2027	
Knockout phase	Semi-finals	—N/a	16 April 2027	
Knockout phase	Final	—N/a	19 April 2027	

== UEFA Champions League Path ==
For the UEFA Champions League Path, the 36 teams will play six matches (three home and three away) following the same schedule as the first six matchdays of the 2026–27 UEFA Champions League league phase. The top 22 teams will advance to the knockout phase.

=== Table ===
Pos	Team	Pld	W	D	L	GF	GA	GD	Pts	Qualification
1	(Spain) Real Madrid	3	3	0	0	9	2	+7	9	Advance to knockout phase
2	(Czech Republic) Slavia Prague	3	3	0	0	8	2	+6	9	Advance to knockout phase
3	(Netherlands) Feyenoord	3	3	0	0	7	2	+5	9	Advance to knockout phase
4	(France) Paris Saint-Germain	3	2	1	0	9	2	+7	7	Advance to knockout phase
5	(Spain) Villarreal	3	2	1	0	8	2	+6	7	Advance to knockout phase
6	(Spain) Atlético Madrid	3	2	1	0	9	4	+5	7	Advance to knockout phase
7	(Belgium) Club Brugge	3	2	1	0	10	6	+4	7	Advance to knockout phase
8	(France) Lille	3	2	1	0	6	3	+3	7	Advance to knockout phase
9	(Germany) Borussia Dortmund	3	2	0	1	9	3	+6	6	Advance to knockout phase
10	(Italy) Roma	3	2	0	1	9	3	+6	6	Advance to knockout phase
11	(Netherlands) PSV Eindhoven	3	2	0	1	8	4	+4	6	Advance to knockout phase
12	(Portugal) Porto	3	2	0	1	6	7	−1	6	Advance to knockout phase
13	(Norway) Viking	3	2	0	1	3	5	−2	6	Advance to knockout phase
14	(England) Liverpool	3	1	2	0	6	4	+2	5	Advance to knockout phase
15	(Greece) AEK Athens	3	1	2	0	3	2	+1	5	Advance to knockout phase
16	(Germany) Bayern Munich	3	1	1	1	9	6	+3	4	Advance to knockout phase
17	(Spain) Real Betis	3	1	1	1	6	4	+2	4	Advance to knockout phase
18	(England) Arsenal	3	1	1	1	7	7	0	4	Advance to knockout phase
19	(Portugal) Sporting CP	3	1	1	1	6	6	0	4	Advance to knockout phase
20	(Italy) Como	3	1	1	1	3	3	0	4	Advance to knockout phase
21	(Spain) Barcelona	3	1	1	1	3	3	0	4	Advance to knockout phase
22	(Italy) Inter Milan	3	1	1	1	3	4	−1	4	Advance to knockout phase
23	(Germany) VfB Stuttgart	3	1	0	2	7	5	+2	3	
24	(England) Manchester United	3	1	0	2	6	5	+1	3	
25	(France) Lens	3	1	0	2	6	8	−2	3	
26	(England) Aston Villa	3	1	0	2	5	7	−2	3	
27	(Italy) Napoli	3	1	0	2	2	7	−5	3	
28	(Slovakia) Slovan Bratislava	3	1	0	2	2	11	−9	3	
29	(Austria) LASK	3	0	1	2	3	6	−3	1	
30	(Turkey) Galatasaray	3	0	1	2	3	6	−3	1	
31	(England) Manchester City	3	0	1	2	2	6	−4	1	
32	(Germany) RB Leipzig	3	0	1	2	4	12	−8	1	
33	(Ukraine) Shakhtar Donetsk	3	0	0	3	1	5	−4	0	
34	(Turkey) Fenerbahçe	3	0	0	3	4	9	−5	0	
35	(Azerbaijan) Sabah	3	0	0	3	0	10	−10	0	
36	(Norway) Bodø/Glimt	3	0	0	3	1	12	−11	0	

Updated to match(es) played on 21 October 2026. Source: UEFA
Rules for classification: League phase tiebreakers

=== Results ===
Matchday 1
Home team	Score	Away team
AEK Athens (Greece)	0–0	(Austria) LASK
Club Brugge (Belgium)	5–3	(England) Aston Villa
Borussia Dortmund (Germany)	2–3	(Spain) Villarreal
Porto (Portugal)	3–1	(England) Manchester City
Lille (France)	0–0	(Spain) Real Betis
Real Madrid (Spain)	3–0	(Italy) Inter Milan
VfB Stuttgart (Germany)	5–0	(Norway) Viking
Liverpool (England)	2–2	(Spain) Atlético Madrid
Paris Saint-Germain (France)	6–1	(Slovakia) Slovan Bratislava
Sporting CP (Portugal)	2–2	(Turkey) Galatasaray
Napoli (Italy)	1–2	(England) Arsenal
Barcelona (Spain)	1–2	(Netherlands) Feyenoord
Fenerbahçe (Turkey)	2–4	(Italy) Roma
PSV Eindhoven (Netherlands)	1–0	(Ukraine) Shakhtar Donetsk
Como (Italy)	1–1	(Germany) RB Leipzig
Bayern Munich (Germany)	6–1	(Norway) Bodø/Glimt
Manchester United (England)	5–0	(Azerbaijan) Sabah
Slavia Prague (Czech Republic)	2–1	(France) Lens

Matchday 2
Home team	Score	Away team
Lens (France)	3–2	(Portugal) Sporting CP
Sabah (Azerbaijan)	0–3	(Czech Republic) Slavia Prague
Arsenal (England)	2–3	(France) Lille
Atlético Madrid (Spain)	3–0	(England) Manchester United
Inter Milan (Italy)	1–1	(Belgium) Club Brugge
Galatasaray (Turkey)	0–1	(Spain) Barcelona
RB Leipzig (Germany)	1–6	(Netherlands) PSV Eindhoven
Viking (Norway)	2–0	(Germany) Bayern Munich
Villarreal (Spain)	5–0	(Italy) Napoli
Feyenoord (Netherlands)	1–0	(Italy) Como
LASK (Austria)	2–4	(England) Liverpool
Roma (Italy)	0–1	(Spain) Real Madrid
Aston Villa (England)	2–1	(Turkey) Fenerbahçe
Shakhtar Donetsk (Ukraine)	1–2	(Greece) AEK Athens
Bodø/Glimt (Norway)	0–5	(Germany) Borussia Dortmund
Manchester City (England)	0–2	(France) Paris Saint-Germain
Real Betis (Spain)	5–0	(Portugal) Porto
Slovan Bratislava (Slovakia)	1–0	(Germany) VfB Stuttgart

Matchday 3
Home team	Score	Away team
Fenerbahçe (Turkey)	1–3	(Czech Republic) Slavia Prague
Sabah (Azerbaijan)	0–2	(Germany) Borussia Dortmund
Roma (Italy)	5–0	(Slovakia) Slovan Bratislava
Porto (Portugal)	3–1	(Netherlands) PSV Eindhoven
Liverpool (England)	0–0	(Spain) Villarreal
Manchester City (England)	1–1	(Greece) AEK Athens
Paris Saint-Germain (France)	1–1	(Spain) Barcelona
Napoli (Italy)	1–0	(Norway) Bodø/Glimt
VfB Stuttgart (Germany)	2–4	(Spain) Atlético Madrid
Como (Italy)	2–1	(England) Manchester United
Lille (France)	3–1	(Turkey) Galatasaray
Aston Villa (England)	0–1	(Norway) Viking
Club Brugge (Belgium)	4–2	(France) Lens
Bayern Munich (Germany)	3–3	(England) Arsenal
Inter Milan (Italy)	2–0	(Ukraine) Shakhtar Donetsk
Real Madrid (Spain)	5–2	(Germany) RB Leipzig
Real Betis (Spain)	1–4	(Netherlands) Feyenoord
Sporting CP (Portugal)	2–1	(Austria) LASK

Matchday 4
Home team	Score	Away team
Shakhtar Donetsk (Ukraine)	3 Nov	(Portugal) Sporting CP
Galatasaray (Turkey)	3 Nov	(Germany) VfB Stuttgart
Atlético Madrid (Spain)	3 Nov	(Germany) Bayern Munich
Barcelona (Spain)	3 Nov	(England) Aston Villa
Feyenoord (Netherlands)	3 Nov	(Italy) Inter Milan
Bodø/Glimt (Norway)	3 Nov	(France) Lille
LASK (Austria)	3 Nov	(Slovakia) Slovan Bratislava
Manchester United (England)	3 Nov	(Italy) Roma
Villarreal (Spain)	3 Nov	(France) Paris Saint-Germain
AEK Athens (Greece)	4 Nov	(Spain) Real Madrid
Fenerbahçe (Turkey)	4 Nov	(England) Liverpool
Borussia Dortmund (Germany)	4 Nov	(Spain) Real Betis
Porto (Portugal)	4 Nov	(Italy) Napoli
PSV Eindhoven (Netherlands)	4 Nov	(Belgium) Club Brugge
RB Leipzig (Germany)	4 Nov	(England) Manchester City
Lens (France)	4 Nov	(Italy) Como
Slavia Prague (Czech Republic)	4 Nov	(England) Arsenal
Viking (Norway)	4 Nov	(Azerbaijan) Sabah

Matchday 5
Home team	Score	Away team
Bodø/Glimt (Norway)	24 Nov	(Austria) LASK
Galatasaray (Turkey)	24 Nov	(England) Aston Villa
Arsenal (England)	24 Nov	(Germany) Borussia Dortmund
Como (Italy)	24 Nov	(Greece) AEK Athens
Feyenoord (Netherlands)	24 Nov	(Portugal) Porto
Manchester City (England)	24 Nov	(Italy) Napoli
RB Leipzig (Germany)	24 Nov	(France) Lens
Real Madrid (Spain)	24 Nov	(Netherlands) PSV Eindhoven
Slovan Bratislava (Slovakia)	24 Nov	(Spain) Real Betis
Sabah (Azerbaijan)	25 Nov	(Spain) Barcelona
Slavia Prague (Czech Republic)	25 Nov	(Spain) Villarreal
Atlético Madrid (Spain)	25 Nov	(Norway) Viking
Club Brugge (Belgium)	25 Nov	(England) Liverpool
Inter Milan (Italy)	25 Nov	(Germany) VfB Stuttgart
Shakhtar Donetsk (Ukraine)	25 Nov	(Turkey) Fenerbahçe
Lille (France)	25 Nov	(Germany) Bayern Munich
Paris Saint-Germain (France)	25 Nov	(Italy) Roma
Sporting CP (Portugal)	25 Nov	(England) Manchester United

Matchday 6
Home team	Score	Away team
Viking (Norway)	8 Dec	(Netherlands) Feyenoord
Villarreal (Spain)	8 Dec	(Azerbaijan) Sabah
AEK Athens (Greece)	8 Dec	(Turkey) Galatasaray
Roma (Italy)	8 Dec	(Portugal) Sporting CP
Aston Villa (England)	8 Dec	(France) Paris Saint-Germain
Barcelona (Spain)	8 Dec	(England) Manchester City
Bayern Munich (Germany)	8 Dec	(Czech Republic) Slavia Prague
Manchester United (England)	8 Dec	(Germany) RB Leipzig
Napoli (Italy)	8 Dec	(Belgium) Club Brugge
Real Betis (Spain)	9 Dec	(Italy) Como
Slovan Bratislava (Slovakia)	9 Dec	(Ukraine) Shakhtar Donetsk
Arsenal (England)	9 Dec	(Spain) Real Madrid
Borussia Dortmund (Germany)	9 Dec	(Italy) Inter Milan
LASK (Austria)	9 Dec	(Turkey) Fenerbahçe
Liverpool (England)	9 Dec	(Portugal) Porto
PSV Eindhoven (Netherlands)	9 Dec	(Spain) Atlético Madrid
Lens (France)	9 Dec	(Norway) Bodø/Glimt
VfB Stuttgart (Germany)	9 Dec	(France) Lille

== Domestic Champions Path ==
For the Domestic Champions Path, the 50 teams were drawn into three rounds of two-legged home-and-away ties, with the 30 clubs from the top ranked associations starting directly from the second round. The draw for all three rounds was held on 1 September 2026.

The ten third round winners will advance to the round of 32.

=== First round ===
The first legs will be played on 16 September and the second legs on 14 October 2026.

The winners of the ties will advance to the second round.

First round
Team 1	Agg.	Team 2	1st leg	2nd leg
Flora (Estonia)	7–1	(Faroe Islands) HB	3–0	4–1
Þór Akureyri (Iceland)	3–6	(Lithuania) Žalgiris	3–4	0–2
Cliftonville (Northern Ireland)	0–1	(Latvia) Super Nova	0–0	0–1
HJK (Finland)	8–1	(Kosovo) Ballkani	6–0	2–1
Cardiff Met (Wales)	4–1	(Luxembourg) UNA Strassen	4–0	0–1
Valletta (Malta)	0–6	(Albania) Partizani	0–2	0–4
Mladost Donja Gorica (Montenegro)	1–13	(Kazakhstan) Kairat	0–5	1–8
Dinamo Tbilisi (Georgia (country))	6–6 (3–1 p)	(Belarus) Dinamo Minsk	3–4	3–2
FC Santa Coloma (Andorra)	0–11	(North Macedonia) AP Brera Strumica	0–3	0–8
Zrinjski Mostar (Bosnia and Herzegovina)	10–1	(Gibraltar) Lincoln Red Imps	6–0	4–1

=== Second round ===
The winners of the ties advanced to the third round.

Second round
Team 1	Agg.	Team 2	1st leg	2nd leg
Flora (Estonia)	Match 1	(England) Chelsea	28 Oct	4 Nov
St Patrick's Athletic (Republic of Ireland)	Match 2	(Lithuania) Žalgiris	28 Oct	4 Nov
Genk (Belgium)	Match 3	(Austria) Red Bull Salzburg	28 Oct	3 Nov
Bravo (Slovenia)	Match 4	(Serbia) Red Star Belgrade	28 Oct	4 Nov
Dynamo Kyiv (Ukraine)	Match 5	(Scotland) Rangers	28 Oct	4 Nov
AZ (Netherlands)	Match 6	(Turkey) Göztepe	3–1	3 Nov
Legia Warsaw (Poland)	Match 7	(France) Clermont	28 Oct	4 Nov
Hammarby (Sweden)	Match 8	(Latvia) Super Nova	28 Oct	4 Nov
HJK (Finland)	Match 9	(Slovakia) Žilina	28 Oct	4 Nov
Stabæk (Norway)	Match 10	(Wales) Cardiff Met	28 Oct	4 Nov
Partizani (Albania)	Match 11	(Czech Republic) Hradec Králové	28 Oct	4 Nov
MTK Budapest (Hungary)	Match 12	(Kazakhstan) Kairat	28 Oct	4 Nov
Dinamo Tbilisi (Georgia (country))	Match 13	(Denmark) Copenhagen	28 Oct	4 Nov
Fiorentina (Italy)	Match 14	(Bulgaria) Septemvri Sofia	28 Oct	4 Nov
Qarabağ (Azerbaijan)	Match 15	(Croatia) Dinamo Zagreb	28 Oct	4 Nov
Benfica (Portugal)	Match 16	(Cyprus) Pafos	28 Oct	4 Nov
Farul Constanța (Romania)	Match 17	(Moldova) Sheriff Tiraspol	28 Oct	4 Nov
Zürich (Switzerland)	Match 18	(Israel) Maccabi Tel Aviv	28 Oct	3 Nov
AP Brera Strumica (North Macedonia)	Match 19	(Germany) TSG Hoffenheim	28 Oct	4 Nov
Zrinjski Mostar (Bosnia and Herzegovina)	Match 20	(Greece) PAOK	28 Oct	4 Nov

=== Third round ===
The winners of the ties advanced to the knockout phase.

Third round
Team 1	Agg.	Team 2	1st leg	2nd leg
	Match 1		25 Nov	9 Dec
	Match 2		25 Nov	9 Dec
	Match 3		25 Nov	9 Dec
	Match 4		25 Nov	9 Dec
	Match 5		25 Nov	9 Dec
	Match 6		25 Nov	9 Dec
	Match 7		25 Nov	9 Dec
	Match 8		25 Nov	9 Dec
	Match 9		25 Nov	9 Dec
	Match 10		25 Nov	9 Dec

== See also ==
- Under-20 Intercontinental Cup
- 2026–27 UEFA Champions League
