= Luca Eden =

English footballer (born 2011)

Personal information
- Date of birth: 11 March 2011 (age 15)
- Place of birth: England
- Position: Midfielder

Team information
- Current team: Liverpool

Youth career
- West Kirby Panthers
- Liverpool

International career^{‡}
| Years | Team | Apps | (Gls) |
- England U15
| 2026– | England U16 | 2 | (1) |
- ‡ National team caps and goals as of 27 August 2026

Luca Eden (born 11 March 2011) is an English academy footballer who plays as a midfielder for Liverpool.

== Early life ==
Eden was born on 11 March 2011. Born in England, he is a native of Wirral Peninsula, England. He attended Calday Grange Grammar School in England.

At the age of eleven, he signed a sponsorship contract with American sporting apparel brand Nike.

== Club career ==
As a youth player, Eden joined the youth academy of West Kirby Panthers. Following his stint there, he joined the youth academy of Premier League side Liverpool at under-9 level. On 29 November 2025, he debuted for the club's under-18 team during a 0–7 home loss to Manchester United in the league, becoming the youngest Liverpool player to play in the competition.

On 9 September 2026, he made his UEFA Youth League debut for them during a 2–2 home draw with Atlético Madrid, becoming the youngest Liverpool player to play in the competition.

== International career ==
Eden is an England youth international and has represented the country internationally at under-15 and under-16 level and captained the England national under-15 football team. On 25 August 2026, he debuted for the England national under-17 football team during a 2–3 away friendly loss to the Italy national under-16 football team.
