= Enis Redzepi =

Kosovan footballer (born 2008)

Personal information
- Date of birth: 12 March 2008 (age 18)
- Place of birth: Heilbronn, Germany
- Height: 1.85 m (6 ft 1 in)
- Position: Forward

Team information
- Current team: VfB Stuttgart II
- Number: 39

Youth career
- 2013–2015: Union Böckingen
- 2015–2016: Neckarsulmer SU
- 2016–2017: Union Böckingen
- 2017–2021: TSG Hoffenheim
- 2021–: VfB Stuttgart

Senior career*
Years	Team	Apps	(Gls)
2026–	VfB Stuttgart II	8	(1)

International career^{‡}
2024–2025	Albania U17	7	(0)
2026	Albania U19	3	(1)
- * Club domestic league appearances and goals as of 24 October 2026 ‡ National team caps and goals as of 6 November 2026

Enis Redzepi (Albanian: Rexhepi; born 12 March 2008) is a professional footballer who plays as a forward for 3. Liga club VfB Stuttgart II. Born in Germany, he represented Albania at youth international levels but in 2026 switched to play for Kosovo national team at senior level.

== Club career ==
Redzepi began his youth career with Union Böckingen, where he played from 2013 to 2015. He then joined Neckarsulmer SU for the 2015–16 season before returning to Union Böckingen for the 2016–17 season. In 2017, he moved to TSG Hoffenheim, where he spent four years in the club's youth academy. In 2021, Redzepi joined VfB Stuttgart's academy, where he continued his development through the club's youth teams.

During the 2025–26 season, Redzepi played for VfB Stuttgart's under-19 team in the Under 19 Bundesliga. Despite being eligible for a younger age group, he scored 18 goals and provided eight assists in 21 appearances in the competition.

He was part of the VfB Stuttgart under-19 team that won the DFB-Pokal Junioren in the 2025–26 season. In the final against VfL Wolfsburg on 22 May 2026, Redzepi scored the opening goal in a 3–0 victory. The final was played in Potsdam in front of a record attendance of 8,040 spectators.

Redzepi continued his goalscoring form at the beginning of the 2026–27 season. In a 6–1 away victory against Bayern Munich's under-19 team, he scored five goals. He also scored a hat-trick in VfB Stuttgart's 5–0 victory against Viking in the UEFA Youth League on 9 September 2026.

On 10 September 2026, VfB Stuttgart announced that Redzepi had signed an early contract extension. The club's academy director, Stephan Hildebrandt, praised his development and ability to positively influence his teammates.

Redzepi made his professional debut for VfB Stuttgart II in the 3. Liga on 6 September 2026, during the fourth matchday of the 2026–27 season. He came on as a half-time substitute in an away match against Würzburger Kickers, which Stuttgart won 2–1.

He scored his first goal in the 3. Liga on 13 October 2026, in a 3–2 victory against TSG Hoffenheim II. Redzepi opened the scoring in the ninth minute.

== International career ==
Between 2024 and 2026, Redzepi represented Albania at youth international level, featuring for the U17 and U19 teams, making ten appearances and scoring one goal.

On 26 October 2026, Redzepi met with Football Federation of Kosovo president Agim Ademi in Stuttgart, following positive talks regarding a potential switch of international allegiance to the Kosovo national senior team. Eleven days later, he received a call-up from the Kosovo national senior team for the 2026–27 UEFA Nations League matches against Israel and the Republic of Ireland. However, he was unavailable for these matches because FIFA did not permit him to represent Kosovo due to issues with his documentation.

== Personal life ==
Redzepi was born in Heilbronn, Germany, to an Albanian family of footballers from Preševo. His older brother, Hajrulla, is an active footballer for TSV Weilimdorf and a futsal player for the Germany national team, while his older sister, Dafina, is a footballer for Frauen-Bundesliga club VfB Stuttgart and a former Germany youth international who represented the Albania national team in a pair of friendlies, before returning to the Germany national under-23 team.
