= Luis Muñoz (footballer, born 2011) =

English footballer (born 2011)

Personal information
- Date of birth: 18 December 2011 (age 14)
- Place of birth: England
- Position: Midfielder

Team information
- Current team: Arsenal
- Number: 98

Youth career
- Arsenal

International career
Years	Team	Apps	(Gls)
2025–	England U15		

Luis Muñoz (born 18 December 2011) is an English footballer who plays as a midfielder for Arsenal.

== Early life ==
Muñoz was born on 18 December 2011. Born in England, he was born to a Panamanian father of Spanish descent and an English mother of Jamaican descent.

== Club career ==
As a youth player, Munoz joined the youth academy of Premier League side Arsenal. In 2025, he helped the club's under-16 team win the 2024–25 Premier League Cup. On the 26th November 2025, Munoz made his debut for the club's under-19s team in the UEFA Youth League, coming on in the 86th minute in a 4-2 victory over Bayern Munich

== International career ==
Muñoz is an England youth international. During 2025, he debuted for the England national under-15 football team.
