= England national under-16 football team =

National under-16 association football team representing England

England U-16
- Nickname: The Three Lions
- Association: The Football Association (The FA)
- Confederation: UEFA (Europe)
- Head coach: Neil Ryan
- FIFA code: ENG
First colours	Second colours

England national under-16 football team, also known as England under-16s or England U16(s), represents England in association football at an under-16 age level and is controlled by the Football Association, the governing body for football in England.

== Competition history ==
Between 1925 and 2014, the England under-16 team competed in the annual Victory Shield tournament against Scotland, Wales and Northern Ireland. Since World War II, England had won the Victory Shield outright thirty-five times and had been joint winners with Scotland eight times, with Wales twice and with both Scotland and Wales twice. However, in April 2015, the Football Association decided to withdraw from the tournament "for the foreseeable future" with the stated aim of replacing it with matches against European and global opposition.

=== Montaigu Tournament ===
England have competed at the annual Montaigu Tournament, held in Montaigu, France. England won the competition on three occasions between 2008 and 2015, defeating hosts France in the final on all three occasions. In 2008 and 2011, England won in a penalty shoot-out after a 0–0 draw, while in 2015 they won the final outright 3–1. After an eight year wait England were champions again as they defeated Japan on penalties in the final of what was the fiftieth edition of the tournament in April 2023.

== Fixtures and results 2025–2026 ==
=== Friendlies ===
26 August 2025	Italy	2–1	England	Stadio Tre Fontane, Rome
17:30	Donner 2'; Olivieri 4'	Report	Abe 53'	Referee: Giorgio Catalani (Italy)

28 August 2025	Italy	1–2	England	Stadio Tre Fontane, Rome
10:30	Donner 89'	Report	Johnson 38'; Abe 90+5'	Referee: Luigi Pica (Italy)

30 October 2025	England	5–1	Wales	Arslan Zeki Demirci Sports Complex, Manavgat
12:00	Joseph 13'; Watson 27', 35' (pen.); Abe 28'; Senyah 47'	Report	Roberts 83'

1 November 2025	Turkey	3–2	England	Arslan Zeki Demirci Sports Complex, Manavgat
14:00	Deniz 31', 45'; Canim 47'	Report	Joseph 70', 90'	Referee: Ufuk Kilic (Turkey)

4 November 2025	England	1–2	Portugal	Arslan Zeki Demirci Sports Complex, Manavgat
12:00	Watson 54'	Report	Cabral 7', 29'	Referee: Ugur Eyup Şeker (Turkey)

17 December 2025	England	4–2	Netherlands	St George's Park, Burton upon Trent
13:00	Joseph 14', 15', 16'; Senyah 62'	Report	Martin 40' (o.g.); Fejokwu 65'	Attendance: Behind closed doors Referee: Alex Shaw (England)

18 December 2025	England	4–1	Netherlands	St George's Park, Burton upon Trent
11:00	Blake 4'; Bernard 13', 29', 35'	Report	Fejokwu 52'	Attendance: Behind closed doors Referee: Nick Gray (England)

21 February 2026	England	1–2	Denmark	Arslan Zeki Demirci Sports Complex, Manavgat
19:00	Abe 86'	Report	Christensen 41'; Ekstrand 61'	Attendance: 200; Referee: Oswaldo Contreras (Ecuador)

23 February 2026
England
1–1
(7-6 p)
Spain
Arslan Zeki Demirci Sports Complex, Manavgat
15:00
Wellspring 81'
Report
Fernandez 87'
Referee: Benjamin Seferovic (Denmark)

Penalties

- Watson (penalty scored)

* Joseph 
* Kilwa 
* Johnson 
* Jobling 
* Eze 
* Wellspring 

* Henry (penalty scored)

- (penalty scored) Espejo

* Silva
* Buil
* Fernandez
* Mba
* Palle
* Santos

* (penalty missed) Pena

26 February 2026	England	0–2	France	Arslan Zeki Demirci Sports Complex, Manavgat
15:00	Johnson (red card) 52'	Report	Kherbouch (red card) 52'; Bedja 58', 83'	Referee: Julie Thomsen (Denmark)

16 April 2026	United States	1–1	England	FIU Soccer Stadium, Florida
20:00	Turdean 80'	Report	Kouossu 15'	Referee: Jake Joyce (USA)

19 April 2026	England	2–1	Argentina	Beyond Bancard Field, Florida
22:00	Henry 60'; Joseph 70' (pen.)	Report	Díaz 43' (pen.)	Referee: John Tamayo (USA)

22 April 2026	England	5–1	Mexico	FIU Soccer Stadium, Florida
15:00	Motsi 17'; Osifo 37'; Joseph 51'; Bernard 79'; Kilwa 84'	Report	Gómez 6'	Referee: Jorge Escobar (USA)

25 August 2026	Italy	3–2	England	Municipal Stadium Filippo Pirani, Grottammare
17:30	Ramalho 13'; Sassetti 34'; Pica 76'	Report	Eden 3'; Maghoma 44'	Referee: Jonathan Cornello (Italy)

27 August 2026	Italy	1–2	England	Municipal Stadium Filippo Pirani, Grottammare
10:00	Vitali 80' (pen.)	Report	Haughton-Sinclair 43'; Maghoma 90'	Referee: Andrea Pancani (Italy)

27 October 2026	England	–	Italy	Complexe sportif Léo Lagrange, Bonneuil-sur-Marne
13:00

29 October 2026	England	–	Japan	Stade Louis, Villejuif
13:00

31 October 2026	France	–	England	Complexe sportif Léo Lagrange, Bonneuil-sur-Marne
15:00

== Players ==
=== Current squad ===
The following players were named in the squad for games against Italy, Japan and France, played 27–31 October 2026.

No.	Pos.	Player	Date of birth (age)	Club
	GK	Mason Ellis	-	(The Football Association) Manchester City
	GK	Charlie Mountain	8 August 2011 (age 15)	(The Football Association) Derby County
	GK	Oliver Rain	-	(The Football Association) Bolton Wanderers
	DF	Francis Boggan	12 April 2011 (age 15)	(The Football Association) Everton
	DF	Alban Jarrett Vaz	-	(The Football Association) Brentford
	DF	Lewis John-Charles	-	(The Football Association) Liverpool
	DF	Miloh Kapotwe	18 September 2011 (age 15)	(The Football Association) Fulham
	DF	David Odunukan	-	(Scottish Football Association) Rangers
	DF	Isaac Ogunrinde	26 August 2011 (age 15)	(The Football Association) Crystal Palace
	DF	Concilio Tonebi	28 February 2011 (age 15)	(The Football Association) West Ham United
	DF	Zac Wattley	24 April 2011 (age 15)	(The Football Association) Ipswich Town
	MF	Jaylen Bolton	14 January 2011 (age 15)	(The Football Association) Aston Villa
	MF	Isaiah Gonzales-Osbourne	8 February 2011 (age 15)	(The Football Association) Wolverhampton Wanderers
	MF	Eli Hall	25 September 2011 (age 15)	(The Football Association) Newcastle United
	MF	Zach Hitchen	20 August 2011 (age 15)	(The Football Association) Leeds United
	MF	Marcel Johnson	-	(The Football Association) Southampton
	MF	Charlie Robinson	16 March 2011 (age 15)	(The Football Association) Newcastle United
	MF	Charlie Scorer	16 April 2011 (age 15)	(The Football Association) Sunderland
	FW	Ivanildo Batista	-	(The Football Association) West Ham United
	FW	Jaice Dore	-	(The Football Association) Manchester United
	FW	Nathan Fuala	-	(The Football Association) Wolverhampton Wanderers
	FW	Ashiah Haughton Sinclair	21 April 2011 (age 15)	(The Football Association) Tottenham Hotspur
	FW	Musa Sanyang	-	(The Football Association) Brighton & Hove Albion

==== Recent call-ups ====
The following players have previously been called up to the England under-16 squad and remain eligible.

Pos.	Player	Date of birth (age)	Caps	Goals	Club	Latest call-up
GK	Thomas Armytage	10 January 2011 (age 15)	-	-	(England) Plymouth Argyle	v Italy, August 2026
GK	Aaron Woolford	30 April 2011 (age 15)	-	-	(England) Chelsea	v Italy, August 2026
DF	Travis Chillard-Martin	8 November 2011 (age 14)	-	-	(England) Arsenal	v Italy, August 2026
DF	Oliver Crofts	6 May 2011 (age 15)	-	-	(England) Chelsea	v Italy, August 2026
DF	Rocco Derefaka	14 February 2011 (age 15)	-	-	(England) Blackburn Rovers	v Italy, August 2026
DF	Iago Mendes Da Silva	4 April 2011 (age 15)	-	-	(England) Chelsea	v Italy, August 2026
DF	Rubens Nebatumbu	11 January 2011 (age 15)	-	-	(England) Leicester City	v Italy, August 2026
MF	Luca Eden	11 March 2011 (age 15)	-	-	(England) Liverpool	v Italy, August 2026
MF	Luis Muñoz	18 December 2011 (age 14)	-	-	(England) Arsenal	v Italy, August 2026
MF	Arthur O'Keefe	14 March 2011 (age 15)	-	-	(England) Crystal Palace	v Italy, August 2026
MF	Rico Sealey	29 June 2011 (age 15)	-	-	(England) Chelsea	v Italy, August 2026
FW	Shakeel Charles	12 March 2011 (age 15)	-	-	(England) Sheffield United	v Italy, August 2026
FW	Emmanuel Famokun	9 August 2011 (age 15)	-	-	(England) West Ham United	v Italy, August 2026
FW	Ben Lyne	3 July 2011 (age 15)	-	-	(England) Manchester United	v Italy, August 2026
FW	Jaden Maghoma	13 January 2011 (age 15)	-	-	(England) Arsenal	v Italy, August 2026
FW	Eden Mahoney-Smith	2 February 2011 (age 15)	-	-	(England) Chelsea	v Italy, August 2026
FW	Eliah Semakula	26 March 2011 (age 15)	-	-	(England) Chelsea	v Italy, August 2026
