= Manoël Verhaeghe =

Belgian-Congolese footballer (born 2008)

Personal information
- Full name: Manoël Louis-Philippe Verhaeghe
- Date of birth: 25 March 2008 (age 18)
- Height: 1.87 m (6 ft 2 in)
- Position: Central defender

Team information
- Current team: LASK
- Number: 21

Youth career
- –2024: RWDM Brussels
- 2024-2025: Royale Union Saint-Gilloise

Senior career*
| Years | Team | Apps | (Gls) |
| 2025–2026 | RWDM Brussels | 25 | (1) |
| 2026- | LASK | 1 | (0) |
- * Club domestic league appearances and goals as of 00:15, 1 January 2025 (UTC)

Manoël Louis-Philippe Verhaeghe (born 25 March 2008) is a Congolese-Belgian professional footballer who plays as a central defender for Austrian Football Bundesliga club LASK.

== Club career ==
Verhaeghe played in the RWDM Brussels youth academy for five years prior to joining Royale Union Saint-Gilloise in 2024. After a year, he returned to RWDM Brussels During the 2025-26 season, he established himself as a first-choice central defender for the club and finished the season having made 25 appearances in the Challenger Pro League.

In July 2026, he signed a four-year contract with Austrian champions LASK. He made his league debut for LASK in the Austrian Football Bundesliga on 9 August 2026, playing as a second-half substitute in a 2-0 away win against Austria Vienna.

== International career ==
Verhaeghe was called-up to the Belgian under-18 team for the first time in March 2026. He has also represented the Democratic Republic of Congo at youth level.

== Style of play ==
A right-footed player and 1.87 metres tall, he was described as being a "modern central defender who possesses good qualities on the ball and brings a lot of assertiveness" by LASK sporting director Dino Buric in 2026.
