= 2025–26 UEFA Youth League league phase =

Youth football tournament

The 2025–26 UEFA Youth League UEFA Champions League Path (league phase) began on 16 September and ended on 10 December 2025. A total of 36 teams competed in the group stage of the UEFA Champions League Path to decide 22 of the 36 places in the knockout phase of the 2025–26 UEFA Youth League.

== Format ==
Each team played six matches, three at home and three away, against six different opponents, with all 36 teams ranked in a single league table. The top 22 ranked teams qualified for the round of 32 of the knockout stage, where they were joined by ten winners of the Domestic Champions Path. Teams ranked from 23rd to 36th were eliminated from the competition.

=== Tiebreakers ===
Teams were ranked according to points (3 points for a win, 1 point for a draw, 0 points for a loss). If two or more teams were equal on points upon completion of the league phase, the following tiebreaking criteria were applied, in the order given, to determine their rankings:

1. Goal difference;
2. Goals scored;
3. Away goals scored;
4. Wins;
5. Away wins;
6. Higher number of points obtained collectively by league phase opponents;
7. Superior collective goal difference of league phase opponents;
8. Higher number of goals scored collectively by league phase opponents;
9. Lower disciplinary points total (direct red card = 3 points, yellow card = 1 point, expulsion for two yellow cards in one match = 3 points);
10. Drawing of lots.

During the league phase, criteria 1 to 5 were used to rank teams who have equal number of points. Should any teams be equal on points and tied on the first five criteria, they were considered equal in position and sorted alphabetically. Criteria 6 to 10 would only be used to break ties upon completion of all matches.

== Table ==
| Pos | Team | Pld | W | D | L | GF | GA | GD | Pts | Qualification |
|---|---|---|---|---|---|---|---|---|---|---|
| 1 | (The Football Association) Chelsea | 6 | 5 | 1 | 0 | 23 | 9 | +14 | 16 | Advance to knockout phase |
| 2 | (Portuguese Football Federation) Benfica | 6 | 5 | 0 | 1 | 26 | 7 | +19 | 15 | Advance to knockout phase |
| 3 | (Royal Belgian Football Association) Club Brugge | 6 | 5 | 0 | 1 | 11 | 3 | +8 | 15 | Advance to knockout phase |
| 4 | (Royal Spanish Football Federation) Real Madrid | 6 | 5 | 0 | 1 | 14 | 7 | +7 | 15 | Advance to knockout phase |
| 5 | (Royal Spanish Football Federation) Villarreal | 6 | 5 | 0 | 1 | 12 | 7 | +5 | 15 | Advance to knockout phase |
| 6 | (Royal Spanish Football Federation) Athletic Bilbao | 6 | 4 | 2 | 0 | 17 | 7 | +10 | 14 | Advance to knockout phase |
| 7 | (Royal Spanish Football Federation) Atlético Madrid | 6 | 4 | 1 | 1 | 16 | 8 | +8 | 13 | Advance to knockout phase |
| 8 | (Royal Spanish Football Federation) Barcelona | 6 | 4 | 1 | 1 | 13 | 9 | +4 | 13 | Advance to knockout phase |
| 9 | (The Football Association) Tottenham Hotspur | 6 | 4 | 0 | 2 | 28 | 14 | +14 | 12 | Advance to knockout phase |
| 10 | (The Football Association) Manchester City | 6 | 4 | 0 | 2 | 18 | 8 | +10 | 12 | Advance to knockout phase |
| 11 | (German Football Association) Borussia Dortmund | 6 | 4 | 0 | 2 | 13 | 8 | +5 | 12 | Advance to knockout phase |
| 12 | (Portuguese Football Federation) Sporting CP | 6 | 3 | 3 | 0 | 13 | 10 | +3 | 12 | Advance to knockout phase |
| 13 | (French Football Federation) Paris Saint-Germain | 6 | 3 | 2 | 1 | 17 | 8 | +9 | 11 | Advance to knockout phase |
| 14 | (Italian Football Federation) Inter Milan | 6 | 3 | 2 | 1 | 14 | 8 | +6 | 11 | Advance to knockout phase |
| 15 | (Royal Dutch Football Association) Ajax | 6 | 3 | 1 | 2 | 24 | 16 | +8 | 10 | Advance to knockout phase |
| 16 | (The Football Association) Liverpool | 6 | 3 | 1 | 2 | 8 | 13 | −5 | 10 | Advance to knockout phase |
| 17 | (German Football Association) Bayer Leverkusen | 6 | 3 | 1 | 2 | 9 | 16 | −7 | 10 | Advance to knockout phase |
| 18 | (French Football Federation) Monaco | 6 | 3 | 0 | 3 | 20 | 10 | +10 | 9 | Advance to knockout phase |
| 19 | (Royal Dutch Football Association) PSV Eindhoven | 6 | 2 | 2 | 2 | 13 | 9 | +4 | 8 | Advance to knockout phase |
| 20 | (Football Association of the Czech Republic) Slavia Prague | 6 | 2 | 2 | 2 | 16 | 17 | −1 | 8 | Advance to knockout phase |
| 21 | (German Football Association) Eintracht Frankfurt | 6 | 2 | 1 | 3 | 15 | 13 | +2 | 7 | Advance to knockout phase |
| 22 | (French Football Federation) Marseille | 6 | 2 | 1 | 3 | 12 | 11 | +1 | 7 | Advance to knockout phase |
| 23 | (Danish Football Association) Copenhagen | 6 | 2 | 1 | 3 | 10 | 10 | 0 | 7 | |
| 24 | (Hellenic Football Federation) Olympiacos | 6 | 2 | 1 | 3 | 8 | 10 | −2 | 7 | |
| 25 | (Italian Football Federation) Napoli | 6 | 1 | 3 | 2 | 3 | 6 | −3 | 6 | |
| 26 | (Italian Football Federation) Juventus | 6 | 1 | 2 | 3 | 12 | 11 | +1 | 5 | |
| 27 | (German Football Association) Bayern Munich | 6 | 1 | 1 | 4 | 10 | 16 | −6 | 4 | |
| 28 | (Kazakhstan Football Federation) Kairat | 6 | 1 | 1 | 4 | 8 | 15 | −7 | 4 | |
| 29 | (Italian Football Federation) Atalanta | 6 | 1 | 1 | 4 | 6 | 13 | −7 | 4 | |
| 30 | (Cyprus Football Association) Pafos | 6 | 1 | 1 | 4 | 5 | 15 | −10 | 4 | |
| 31 | (Royal Belgian Football Association) Union Saint-Gilloise | 6 | 1 | 1 | 4 | 7 | 18 | −11 | 4 | |
| 32 | (Turkish Football Federation) Galatasaray | 6 | 1 | 1 | 4 | 6 | 21 | −15 | 4 | |
| 33 | (The Football Association) Arsenal | 6 | 1 | 0 | 5 | 11 | 18 | −7 | 3 | |
| 34 | (The Football Association) Newcastle United | 6 | 0 | 0 | 6 | 6 | 17 | −11 | 0 | |
| 35 | (Norwegian Football Federation) Bodø/Glimt | 6 | 0 | 0 | 6 | 4 | 31 | −27 | 0 | |
| 36 | (Association of Football Federations of Azerbaijan) Qarabağ | 6 | 0 | 0 | 6 | 1 | 30 | −29 | 0 | |

Source: UEFA
Rules for classification: League phase tiebreakers

== Results summary ==
Matchday 1
| Home team | Score | Away team |
|---|---|---|
| Benfica (Portugal) | 7–1 | (Azerbaijan) Qarabağ |
| Athletic Bilbao (Spain) | 3–1 | (England) Arsenal |
| Juventus (Italy) | 2–3 | (Germany) Borussia Dortmund |
| Tottenham Hotspur (England) | 5–3 | (Spain) Villarreal |
| PSV Eindhoven (Netherlands) | 6–2 | (Belgium) Union Saint-Gilloise |
| Real Madrid (Spain) | 3–2 | (France) Marseille |
| Olympiacos (Greece) | 4–0 | (Cyprus) Pafos |
| Slavia Prague (Czech Republic) | 5–0 | (Norway) Bodø/Glimt |
| Paris Saint‑Germain (France) | 5–1 | (Italy) Atalanta |
| Ajax (Netherlands) | 1–1 | (Italy) Inter Milan |
| Bayern Munich (Germany) | 2–3 | (England) Chelsea |
| Liverpool (England) | 0–0 | (Spain) Atlético Madrid |
| Club Brugge (Belgium) | 1–0 | (France) Monaco |
| Copenhagen (Denmark) | 0–2 | (Germany) Bayer Leverkusen |
| Eintracht Frankfurt (Germany) | 4–0 | (Turkey) Galatasaray |
| Sporting CP (Portugal) | 3–2 | (Kazakhstan) Kairat |
| Manchester City (England) | 2–0 | (Italy) Napoli |
| Newcastle United (England) | 2–3 | (Spain) Barcelona |

Matchday 2
| Home team | Score | Away team |
|---|---|---|
| Kairat (Kazakhstan) | 1–4 | (Spain) Real Madrid |
| Bodø/Glimt (Norway) | 0–6 | (England) Tottenham Hotspur |
| Pafos (Cyprus) | 0–3 | (Germany) Bayern Munich |
| Atalanta (Italy) | 0–2 | (Belgium) Club Brugge |
| Galatasaray (Turkey) | 0–2 | (England) Liverpool |
| Marseille (France) | 3–5 | (Netherlands) Ajax |
| Inter Milan (Italy) | 2–2 | (Czech Republic) Slavia Prague |
| Chelsea (England) | 5–2 | (Portugal) Benfica |
| Atlético Madrid (Spain) | 2–1 | (Germany) Eintracht Frankfurt |
| Villarreal (Spain) | 1–0 | (Italy) Juventus |
| Qarabağ (Azerbaijan) | 0–5 | (Denmark) Copenhagen |
| Arsenal (England) | 1–2 | (Greece) Olympiacos |
| Bayer Leverkusen (Germany) | 3–2 | (Netherlands) PSV Eindhoven |
| Napoli (Italy) | 1–1 | (Portugal) Sporting CP |
| Union Saint-Gilloise (Belgium) | 2–0 | (England) Newcastle United |
| Monaco (France) | 3–5 | (England) Manchester City |
| Borussia Dortmund (Germany) | 0–4 | (Spain) Athletic Bilbao |
| Barcelona (Spain) | 2–1 | (France) Paris Saint-Germain |

Matchday 3
| Home team | Score | Away team |
|---|---|---|
| Kairat (Kazakhstan) | 1–3 | (Cyprus) Pafos |
| Barcelona (Spain) | 3–0 | (Greece) Olympiacos |
| Villarreal (Spain) | 2–1 | (England) Manchester City |
| Arsenal (England) | 3–4 | (Spain) Atlético Madrid |
| Bayer Leverkusen (Germany) | 2–2 | (France) Paris Saint-Germain |
| PSV Eindhoven (Netherlands) | 0–0 | (Italy) Napoli |
| Union Saint-Gilloise (Belgium) | 1–2 | (Italy) Inter Milan |
| Copenhagen (Denmark) | 0–2 | (Germany) Borussia Dortmund |
| Newcastle United (England) | 1–5 | (Portugal) Benfica |
| Galatasaray (Turkey) | 3–2 | (Norway) Bodø/Glimt |
| Athletic Bilbao (Spain) | 3–0 | (Azerbaijan) Qarabağ |
| Chelsea (England) | 6–3 | (Netherlands) Ajax |
| Atalanta (Italy) | 2–0 | (Czech Republic) Slavia Prague |
| Eintracht Frankfurt (Germany) | 4–5 | (England) Liverpool |
| Monaco (France) | 2–4 | (England) Tottenham Hotspur |
| Sporting CP (Portugal) | 2–1 | (France) Marseille |
| Real Madrid (Spain) | 1–0 | (Italy) Juventus |
| Bayern Munich (Germany) | 0–3 | (Belgium) Club Brugge |

Matchday 4
| Home team | Score | Away team |
|---|---|---|
| Bodø/Glimt (Norway) | 0–7 | (France) Monaco |
| Napoli (Italy) | 0–0 | (Germany) Eintracht Frankfurt |
| Slavia Prague (Czech Republic) | 5–1 | (England) Arsenal |
| Paris Saint-Germain (France) | 3–0 | (Germany) Bayern Munich |
| Tottenham Hotspur (England) | 2–3 | (Denmark) Copenhagen |
| Liverpool (England) | 0–4 | (Spain) Real Madrid |
| Juventus (Italy) | 2–2 | (Portugal) Sporting CP |
| Atlético Madrid (Spain) | 5–0 | (Belgium) Union Saint-Gilloise |
| Olympiacos (Greece) | 2–2 | (Netherlands) PSV Eindhoven |
| Benfica (Portugal) | 5–0 | (Germany) Bayer Leverkusen |
| Qarabağ (Azerbaijan) | 0–5 | (England) Chelsea |
| Pafos (Cyprus) | 0–2 | (Spain) Villarreal |
| Ajax (Netherlands) | 7–2 | (Turkey) Galatasaray |
| Marseille (France) | 0–0 | (Italy) Atalanta |
| Club Brugge (Belgium) | 2–0 | (Spain) Barcelona |
| Manchester City (England) | 0–3 | (Germany) Borussia Dortmund |
| Inter Milan (Italy) | 3–0 | (Kazakhstan) Kairat |
| Newcastle United (England) | 2–3 | (Spain) Athletic Bilbao |

Matchday 5
| Home team | Score | Away team |
|---|---|---|
| Bodø/Glimt (Norway) | 2–6 | (Italy) Juventus |
| Galatasaray (Turkey) | 1–1 | (Belgium) Union Saint-Gilloise |
| Ajax (Netherlands) | 0–4 | (Portugal) Benfica |
| Slavia Prague (Czech Republic) | 3–3 | (Spain) Athletic Bilbao |
| Chelsea (England) | 1–1 | (Spain) Barcelona |
| Napoli (Italy) | 2–0 | (Azerbaijan) Qarabağ |
| Marseille (France) | 2–0 | (England) Newcastle United |
| Manchester City (England) | 6–0 | (Germany) Bayer Leverkusen |
| Borussia Dortmund (Germany) | 1–2 | (Spain) Villarreal |
| Pafos (Cyprus) | 0–3 | (France) Monaco |
| Copenhagen (Denmark) | 2–2 | (Kazakhstan) Kairat |
| Arsenal (England) | 4–2 | (Germany) Bayern Munich |
| Eintracht Frankfurt (Germany) | 3–2 | (Italy) Atalanta |
| Sporting CP (Portugal) | 2–1 | (Belgium) Club Brugge |
| Paris Saint-Germain (France) | 5–2 | (England) Tottenham Hotspur |
| Liverpool (England) | 1–0 | (Netherlands) PSV Eindhoven |
| Atlético Madrid (Spain) | 4–1 | (Italy) Inter Milan |
| Olympiacos (Greece) | 0–2 | (Spain) Real Madrid |

Matchday 6
| Home team | Score | Away team |
|---|---|---|
| Kairat (Kazakhstan) | 2–0 | (Greece) Olympiacos |
| Bayern Munich (Germany) | 3–3 | (Portugal) Sporting CP |
| Atalanta (Italy) | 1–3 | (England) Chelsea |
| Tottenham Hotspur (England) | 9–1 | (Czech Republic) Slavia Prague |
| PSV Eindhoven (Netherlands) | 3–1 | (Spain) Atlético Madrid |
| Union Saint-Gilloise (Belgium) | 1–4 | (France) Marseille |
| Monaco (France) | 5–0 | (Turkey) Galatasaray |
| Inter Milan (Italy) | 5–0 | (England) Liverpool |
| Barcelona (Spain) | 4–3 | (Germany) Eintracht Frankfurt |
| Benfica (Portugal) | 3–0 | (Italy) Napoli |
| Villarreal (Spain) | 2–0 | (Denmark) Copenhagen |
| Qarabağ (Azerbaijan) | 0–8 | (Netherlands) Ajax |
| Athletic Bilbao (Spain) | 1–1 | (France) Paris Saint-Germain |
| Bayer Leverkusen (Germany) | 2–1 | (England) Newcastle United |
| Juventus (Italy) | 2–2 | (Cyprus) Pafos |
| Club Brugge (Belgium) | 2–1 | (England) Arsenal |
| Borussia Dortmund (Germany) | 4–0 | (Norway) Bodø/Glimt |
| Real Madrid (Spain) | 0–4 | (England) Manchester City |

== Matches ==
The schedule was identical to the first six matchdays of the UEFA Champions League league phase, the fixture list for which was announced on 10 September 2025.

In principle, the matches were played on the same day as the corresponding matches in the Champions League, unless the clubs and UEFA agree otherwise. The matches were played on 16–18 September, 30 September–1 October, 21–22 October, 4–5 November, 25–26 November and 9–10 December 2025.

Times are CET or CEST, (Note: CEST (UTC+2) for dates up to 25 October 2025 (matchdays 1–3), and CET (UTC+1) for dates thereafter (matchdays 4–6).) as listed by UEFA (local times, if different, are in parentheses).

=== Matchday 1 ===
16 September 2025
12:00 (11:00 UTC+1)

| Benfica (Portuguese Football Federation) | 7–1 | (Association of Football Federations of Azerbaijan) Qarabağ |
|---|---|---|
| Miguel Figueiredo 6'; Gonçalo Moreira 15', 17', 27', 38' (pen.); Francisco Silva 20'; Stevan 61' | Report | Gazibayov 85' |

Benfica Campus, Seixal
Attendance: 339
Referee: Jamie Robinson (Northern Ireland)

16 September 2025
12:00

| Athletic Bilbao (Royal Spanish Football Federation) | 3–1 | (The Football Association) Arsenal |
|---|---|---|
| Lozano 12', 85'; Gift 90+2' (pen.) | Report | Bailey-Joseph 46' |

Lezama Campo 2, Lezama
Attendance: 1,418
Referee: Pavle Ilić (Serbia)

16 September 2025
14:00

| Juventus (Italian Football Federation) | 2–3 | (German Football Association) Borussia Dortmund |
|---|---|---|
| Pugno 57'; Crapisto 61' | Report | Albert 9'; Inacio 13'; Kegni 35' |

Juventus Training Ground, Turin
Attendance: 417
Referee: Igor Stojchevski (North Macedonia)

16 September 2025
14:00 (13:00 UTC+1)

| Tottenham Hotspur (The Football Association) | 5–3 | (Royal Spanish Football Federation) Villarreal |
|---|---|---|
| Thompson 15'; Elliott-Parris 40'; Rowswell 55'; Luque Gimeno 71' (o.g.); Williams-Barnett 82' | Report | Barrera Martín 6'; Adelantado 49'; Abad 63' |

Tottenham Training Centre, Enfield
Attendance: 316
Referee: Matteo Marchetti (Italy)

16 September 2025
14:00

| PSV Eindhoven (Royal Dutch Football Association) | 6–2 | (Royal Belgian Football Association) Union Saint-Gilloise |
|---|---|---|
| Verhulst 1', 4'; Verkooijen 10'; Bouhoudane 30', 57', 86' | Report | El Marini 26'; Lindner 29' |

PSV Campus de Herdgang, Eindhoven
Attendance: 380
Referee: Sven Wolfensberger (Switzerland)

16 September 2025
16:00

| Real Madrid (Royal Spanish Football Federation) | 3–2 | (French Football Federation) Marseille |
|---|---|---|
| Calisto 59' (o.g.); Martín 81'; Barroso 88' (pen.) | Report | Mmadi 45', 73' |

Alfredo Di Stéfano Stadium, Madrid
Attendance: 650
Referee: Snir Levy (Israel)

17 September 2025
12:30 (13:30 UTC+3)

| Olympiacos (Hellenic Football Federation) | 4–0 | (Cyprus Football Association) Pafos |
|---|---|---|
| Kotsalos 32'; Hamza 45', 47'; Liatsikouras 58' (pen.) | Report |

Olympiacos FC Training Centre, Piraeus
Attendance: 325
Referee: Ante Čulina (Croatia)

17 September 2025
13:00

| Slavia Prague (Football Association of the Czech Republic) | 5–0 | (Norwegian Football Federation) Bodø/Glimt |
|---|---|---|
| Rajnoha 39', 64'; Naskos 47'; Potměšil 60'; Pikolon 70' | Report |

Sport Centre Radotin, Prague
Attendance: 637
Referee: Johann Ingi Jonsson (Iceland)

17 September 2025
14:30

| Paris Saint-Germain (French Football Federation) | 5–1 | (Italian Football Federation) Atalanta |
|---|---|---|
| Telamio 36'; Ndjantou 42', 57' (pen.), 63'; Mounguengue 78' | Report | Mencaraglia 20' |

Campus PSG, Poissy
Attendance: 764
Referee: Martin Matoša (Slovenia)

17 September 2025
15:00

| Ajax (Royal Dutch Football Association) | 1–1 | (Italian Football Federation) Inter Milan |
|---|---|---|
| Ünüvar 41' | Report | Iddrissou 54' |

De Toekomst, Duivendrecht
Attendance: 1,375
Referee: Edgars Maļcevs (Latvia)

17 September 2025
16:00

| Bayern Munich (German Football Association) | 2–3 | (The Football Association) Chelsea |
|---|---|---|
| Chavez 19', 26' | Report | Antwi 15'; Mheuka 47'; Murray-Campbell 62' |

FC Bayern Campus, Munich
Attendance: 850
Referee: Rares Vidican (Romania)

17 September 2025
16:00 (15:00 UTC+1)

| Liverpool (The Football Association) | 0–0 | (Royal Spanish Football Federation) Atlético Madrid |
|---|---|---|
| | Report |

Liverpool Training Centre, Liverpool
Attendance: 200
Referee: Radoslav Gidzhenov (Bulgaria)

18 September 2025
13:45

| Copenhagen (Danish Football Association) | 0–2 | (German Football Association) Bayer Leverkusen |
|---|---|---|
| | Report | Owen 9', 62' |

Tingbjerg Idrætspark, Copenhagen
Attendance: 452
Referee: Patryk Gryckiewicz (Poland)

18 September 2025
14:00

| Eintracht Frankfurt (German Football Association) | 4–0 | (Turkish Football Federation) Galatasaray |
|---|---|---|
| Fenyő 35'; Staff 63'; Džanović 67'; Prenaj 87' | Report |

Sportpark Dreieich, Dreieich
Referee: Joni Hyytiä (Finland)

18 September 2025
14:00 (13:00 UTC+1)

| Sporting CP (Portuguese Football Federation) | 3–2 | (Kazakhstan Football Federation) Kairat |
|---|---|---|
| Ciesielski 13'; Gonçalves 23'; Martins 56' | Report | Tuyakbayev 70', 77' |

Cidade do Futebol, Oeiras
Attendance: 183
Referee: Tom Owen (Wales)

18 September 2025
15:30

| Club Brugge (Royal Belgian Football Association) | 1–0 | (French Football Federation) Monaco |
|---|---|---|
| Goemaere 53' (pen.) | Report |

The NEST, Roeselare
Attendance: 402
Referee: Dmytro Kubriak (Ukraine)

18 September 2025
16:00 (15:00 UTC+1)

| Manchester City (The Football Association) | 2–0 | (Italian Football Federation) Napoli |
|---|---|---|
| Samba 50'; Heskey 90+8' (pen.) | Report |

Academy Stadium, Manchester
Attendance: 463
Referee: Joakim Östling (Sweden)

18 September 2025
16:00 (15:00 UTC+1)

| Newcastle United (The Football Association) | 2–3 | (Royal Spanish Football Federation) Barcelona |
|---|---|---|
| Shahar 51'; Wooster 81' | Report | Espart 24'; Gistau 44', 45+3' |

Whitley Park, Newcastle upon Tyne
Attendance: 657
Referee: Mihály Káprály (Hungary)

=== Matchday 2 ===
30 September 2025
09:00 (12:00 UTC+5)

| Kairat (Kazakhstan Football Federation) | 1–4 | (Royal Spanish Football Federation) Real Madrid |
|---|---|---|
| Bekbolat 58' | Report | Barroso 8'; Valdepeñas 18'; Martín 38'; Ortega 77' |

FC Kairat Academy, Almaty
Attendance: 225
Referee: Zorbay Küçük (Turkey)

30 September 2025
11:00

| Bodø/Glimt (Norwegian Football Federation) | 0–6 | (The Football Association) Tottenham Hotspur |
|---|---|---|
| | Report | Olusesi 21', 70'; Byrne 27'; Rowswell 42'; Thompson 80'; Elliott-Parris 85' |

Aspmyra Stadion, Bodø
Attendance: 630
Referee: Granit Maqedonci (Sweden)

30 September 2025
13:00 (14:00 UTC+3)

| Pafos (Cyprus Football Association) | 0–3 | (German Football Association) Bayern Munich |
|---|---|---|
| | Report | Rovere 34', 79'; Licina 75' |

Stelios Kyriakides Stadium, Paphos
Attendance: 510
Referee: David Dickinson (Scotland)

30 September 2025
14:00

| Atalanta (Italian Football Federation) | 0–2 | (Royal Belgian Football Association) Club Brugge |
|---|---|---|
| | Report | Bisiwu 31', 87' |

Centro Sportivo Bortolotti - Pitch 9, Bergamo
Attendance: 264
Referee: Danilo Nikolić (Serbia)

30 September 2025
14:00 (15:00 UTC+3)

| Galatasaray (Turkish Football Federation) | 0–2 | (The Football Association) Liverpool |
|---|---|---|
| | Report | Ahmed 2'; Sonni-Lambie 21' |

Esenler Stadium, Istanbul
Attendance: 455
Referee: João Gonçalves (Portugal)

30 September 2025
14:30

| Marseille (French Football Federation) | 3–5 | (Royal Dutch Football Association) Ajax |
|---|---|---|
| Abdallah 25'; El Kadmiri 33'; Camara 37' | Report | Unuvar 11', 51'; Verkuijl 45+4'; Nash 73'; Teuwsen 90+4' |

Stade Francis-Turcan, Martigues
Attendance: 699
Referee: Daniel Higraff (Norway)

30 September 2025
16:00

| Inter Milan (Italian Football Federation) | 2–2 | (Football Association of the Czech Republic) Slavia Prague |
|---|---|---|
| Zouin 48'; Lavelli 67' | Report | Ballo 39' (o.g.); Naskos 90+1' |

Youth Development Training Center, Milan
Attendance: 402
Referee: Márton Rúsz (Hungary)

30 September 2025
16:00 (15:00 UTC+1)

| Chelsea (The Football Association) | 5–2 | (Portuguese Football Federation) Benfica |
|---|---|---|
| Mheuka 23' (pen.), 55' (pen.), 64'; Kavuma-McQueen 78'; Barbour 84' | Report | Umeh 30'; Banjaqui 70' |

Chelsea Football Club Training Ground, Surrey
Attendance: 268
Referee: Marc Nagtegaal (Netherlands)

30 September 2025
16:00

| Atlético Madrid (Royal Spanish Football Federation) | 2–1 | (German Football Association) Eintracht Frankfurt |
|---|---|---|
| Vinatea 84'; Rajado 90+3' | Report | Staff 37' |

Centro Deportivo Wanda Alcalá de Henares, Madrid
Attendance: 348
Referee: Konstantinos Fellas (Cyprus)

1 October 2025
12:00

| Villarreal (Royal Spanish Football Federation) | 1–0 | (Italian Football Federation) Juventus |
|---|---|---|
| Portela 78' | Report |

Ciudad Deportiva Villarreal CF, Villarreal
Attendance: 715
Referee: Christos Vergetis (Greece)

1 October 2025
12:00 (14:00 UTC+4)

| Qarabağ (Association of Football Federations of Azerbaijan) | 0–5 | (Danish Football Association) Copenhagen |
|---|---|---|
| | Report | Ankamafio 19'; Olsen 21'; Daðason 28'; Frimpong 63', 79' |

Qarabagh Stadium, Baku
Attendance: 200
Referee: Amine Kourgheli (Belarus)

1 October 2025
14:00 (13:00 UTC+1)

| Arsenal (The Football Association) | 1–2 | (Hellenic Football Federation) Olympiacos |
|---|---|---|
| Ogunnaike 83' | Report | Cortes 21'; Filis 37' |

Meadow Park, Borehamwood
Attendance: 421
Referee: Matteo Marcenaro (Italy)

1 October 2025
14:00

| Bayer Leverkusen (German Football Association) | 3–2 | (Royal Dutch Football Association) PSV Eindhoven |
|---|---|---|
| Mensah 16'; Buck 46'; Culbreath 57' | Report | Jones 14'; Domnic 17' (o.g.) |

Ulrich-Haberland-Stadion, Leverkusen
Attendance: 472
Referee: Helgi Mikael Jónasson (Iceland)

1 October 2025
14:00

| Napoli (Italian Football Federation) | 1–1 | (Portuguese Football Federation) Sporting CP |
|---|---|---|
| Caucci 54' | Report | Gonçalves 39' |

Giuseppe Piccolo, Cercola
Attendance: 297
Referee: Edgars Maļcevs (Latvia)

1 October 2025
14:30

| Union Saint-Gilloise (Royal Belgian Football Association) | 2–0 | (The Football Association) Newcastle United |
|---|---|---|
| Hamoutahar 6'; Keita 45+3' | Report |

Joseph Marien Stadium, Brussels
Attendance: 799
Referee: Menelaos Antoniou (Cyprus)

1 October 2025
15:00

| Monaco (French Football Federation) | 3–5 | (The Football Association) Manchester City |
|---|---|---|
| Haddani 35', 61'; Chukwuani 90+1' | Report | Sangare 13', 33' (pen.), 89'; McFarlane 19'; McAidoo 50' |

Stade de formation AS Monaco 1, La Turbie
Attendance: 350
Referee: Mikkel Redder (Denmark)

1 October 2025
16:00

| Borussia Dortmund (German Football Association) | 0–4 | (Royal Spanish Football Federation) Athletic Bilbao |
|---|---|---|
| | Report | Lozano 52'; Sánchez 79'; Oyharcabal 84'; Imga 86' |

Dortmund Brackel Training Ground, Dortmund
Attendance: 731
Referee: Patrik Kolarić (Croatia)

1 October 2025
16:00

| Barcelona (Royal Spanish Football Federation) | 2–1 | (French Football Federation) Paris Saint-Germain |
|---|---|---|
| Kluivert 67'; Espart 73' | Report | Telamio 43' |

Estadi Johan Cruyff, Sant Joan Despí
Attendance: 909
Referee: Antoni Bandić (Bosnia and Herzegovina)

=== Matchday 3 ===
21 October 2025
09:00 (12:00 UTC+5)

| Kairat (Kazakhstan Football Federation) | 1–3 | (Cyprus Football Association) Pafos |
|---|---|---|
| Toleukhan 51' | Report | Terrones 8'; Michael 43'; Alves 82' |

FC Kairat Academy, Almaty
Attendance: 225
Referee: Artem Gasparyan (Armenia)

21 October 2025
12:00

| Barcelona (Royal Spanish Football Federation) | 3–0 | (Hellenic Football Federation) Olympiacos |
|---|---|---|
| Guerrero 13'; Goren 18', 24' | Report |

Johan Cruyff Stadium, Sant Joan Despí
Attendance: 872
Referee: Jacob Karlsen (Denmark)

21 October 2025
12:00

| Villarreal (Royal Spanish Football Federation) | 2–1 | (The Football Association) Manchester City |
|---|---|---|
| Roca Martínez 21'; Gaitán Díaz 29' | Report | Mukasa 61' |

Ciudad Deportiva Villarreal CF, Villarreal
Attendance: 1,000
Referee: Mohammad Usman Aslam (Norway)

21 October 2025
14:00 (13:00 UTC+1)

| Arsenal (The Football Association) | 3–4 | (Royal Spanish Football Federation) Atlético Madrid |
|---|---|---|
| Dudziak 3'; Dowman 29' (pen.), 85' (pen.) | Report | Vinatea 17'; Esteban 56' (pen.); Gómez 58'; Barrios 86' |

Meadow Park, Borehamwood
Attendance: 397
Referee: Sven Wolfensberger (Switzerland)

21 October 2025
14:00

| Bayer Leverkusen (German Football Association) | 2–2 | (French Football Federation) Paris Saint-Germain |
|---|---|---|
| Kir 37'; Kurowski 64' | Report | Abo El Nay 52'; Jangeal 55' (pen.) |

Ulrich-Haberland-Stadion, Leverkusen
Attendance: 611
Referee: Danilo Nikolić (Serbia)

21 October 2025
14:30

| PSV Eindhoven (Royal Dutch Football Association) | 0–0 | (Italian Football Federation) Napoli |
|---|---|---|
| | Report |

PSV Campus de Herdgang, Eindhoven
Attendance: 653
Referee: Radoslav Gidzhenov (Bulgaria)

21 October 2025
14:30

| Union Saint-Gilloise (Royal Belgian Football Association) | 1–2 | (Italian Football Federation) Inter Milan |
|---|---|---|
| Keita 62' | Report | Kukulis 90+2'; Bovio 90+6' |

Joseph Marien Stadium, Brussels
Attendance: 581
Referee: Ben McMaster (Northern Ireland)

21 October 2025
16:00

| Copenhagen (Danish Football Association) | 0–2 | (German Football Association) Borussia Dortmund |
|---|---|---|
| | Report | Kegni 47'; Faust 90+5' |

Tingbjerg Idrætspark, Copenhagen
Referee: Oguzhan Çakir (Türkiye)

21 October 2025
16:00 (15:00 UTC+1)

| Newcastle United (The Football Association) | 1–5 | (Portuguese Football Federation) Benfica |
|---|---|---|
| Brayson 88' | Report | Fernandes 35', 68', 90+3'; Silva 57'; Moreira 77' |

Whitley Park, Newcastle upon Tyne
Attendance: 426
Referee: Lothar D'hondt (Belgium)

22 October 2025
12:00 (13:00 UTC+3)

| Galatasaray (Turkish Football Federation) | 3–2 | (Norwegian Football Federation) Bodø/Glimt |
|---|---|---|
| Eriş 4'; Koçak 37'; Karasu 90+2' | Report | Rodahl 51', 54' (pen.) |

Esenler Stadium, Istanbul
Attendance: 320
Referee: Joey Kooij (The Netherlands)

22 October 2025
12:00

| Athletic Bilbao (Royal Spanish Football Federation) | 3–0 | (Association of Football Federations of Azerbaijan) Qarabağ |
|---|---|---|
| Huestamendia 5'; Lozano 70'; Imga 89' | Report |

Lezama Campo 2, Lezama
Attendance: 983
Referee: Gal Levi (Israel)

22 October 2025
14:00 (13:00 UTC+1)

| Chelsea (The Football Association) | 6–3 | (Royal Dutch Football Association) Ajax |
|---|---|---|
| Derry 3'; Nicoll-Jazuli 26'; Ampah 63', 74'; Antwi 79'; Holland 88' | Report | Messori 10'; Teuwsen 84'; Simeon 90+3' |

Chelsea Football Club Training Ground, Surrey
Attendance: 273
Referee: Florian Badstübner (Germany)

22 October 2025
14:00

| Atalanta (Italian Football Federation) | 2–0 | (Football Association of the Czech Republic) Slavia Prague |
|---|---|---|
| Kolísek 64' (o.g.); Gasparello 85' | Report |

Centro Sportivo Bortolotti - Pitch 9, Bergamo
Attendance: 265
Referee: João Gonçalves (Portugal)

22 October 2025
14:00

| Eintracht Frankfurt (German Football Association) | 4–5 | (The Football Association) Liverpool |
|---|---|---|
| Oteng-Mensah 9'; Souza 34'; Fenyő 35'; Tsiokos 90+1' | Report | Kone-Doherty 17', 51'; Osei 22' (o.g.); Sonni-Lambie 44'; 'Connor 68' |

Sportpark Dreieich, Dreieich
Attendance: 1,382
Referee: Oscar Johnson (Sweden)

22 October 2025
14:00

| Monaco (French Football Federation) | 2–4 | (The Football Association) Tottenham Hotspur |
|---|---|---|
| Tincres 27', 47' | Report | Irow 14'; Upson 58'; Thompson 73'; Black 82' |

Stade de formation AS Monaco 1, La Turbie
Attendance: 250
Referee: Szabolcs Kovacs (Romania)

22 October 2025
15:00 (14:00 UTC+1)

| Sporting CP (Portuguese Football Federation) | 2–1 | (French Football Federation) Marseille |
|---|---|---|
| Gonçalves 11'; Simão 81' | Report | Bakola 47' |

Cidade do Futebol, Oeiras
Attendance: 414
Referee: Patrik Kolarić (Croatia)

22 October 2025
16:00

| Real Madrid (Royal Spanish Football Federation) | 1–0 | (Italian Football Federation) Juventus |
|---|---|---|
| Navascues 13' | Report |

Alfredo Di Stéfano Stadium, Madrid
Attendance: 834
Referee: Lukasz Kuzma (Poland)

22 October 2025
16:00

| Bayern Munich (German Football Association) | 0–3 | (Royal Belgian Football Association) Club Brugge |
|---|---|---|
| | Report | Goemaere 26' (pen.); Musuayi €8'; Verlinden 85' |

FC Bayern Campus, Munich
Attendance: 1,042
Referee: Jakob Semler (Austria)

=== Matchday 4 ===
4 November 2025
11:00

| Bodø/Glimt (Norwegian Football Federation) | 0–7 | (French Football Federation) Monaco |
|---|---|---|
| | Report | Tincres 40' (pen.), 72', 74'; Chukwuani 43', 54'; Ajroud 80'; Dodo 87' |

Aspmyra Stadion, Bodø
Attendance: 440
Referee: Florian Lata (Albania)

4 November 2025
11:30

| Napoli (Italian Football Federation) | 0–0 | (German Football Association) Eintracht Frankfurt |
|---|---|---|
| | Report |

Giuseppe Piccolo, Cercola
Attendance: 159
Referee: Kamal Umudlu (Azerbaijan)

4 November 2025
13:00

| Slavia Prague (Football Association of the Czech Republic) | 5–1 | (The Football Association) Arsenal |
|---|---|---|
| O'Neill 11' (o.g.); Szywała 23'; Kolísek 32'; Suleiman 90+2'; Kotrba 90+5' (pen.) | Report | O'Neill 60' |

Sport Centre Radotin, Prague
Attendance: 1,021
Referee: Sayat Karabayev (Kazakhstan)

4 November 2025
14:00

| Paris Saint-Germain (French Football Federation) | 3–0 | (German Football Association) Bayern Munich |
|---|---|---|
| Jangeal 5'; Ly 50'; Idder 90+9' (pen.) | Report |

Campus PSG, Poissy
Attendance: 1,032
Referee: Karl Koppel (Estonia)

4 November 2025
14:00 (13:00 UTC+1)

| Tottenham Hotspur (The Football Association) | 2–3 | (Danish Football Association) Copenhagen |
|---|---|---|
| Olusesi 49'; Thompson 73' | Report | Olsen 31'; Sarapata 40'; Moalem 54' |

Tottenham Training Centre, Enfield
Attendance: 325
Referee: Miguel Nogueira (Portugal)

4 November 2025
15:00 (14:00 UTC+1)

| Liverpool (The Football Association) | 0–4 | (Royal Spanish Football Federation) Real Madrid |
|---|---|---|
| | Report | Ortega 14'; Pérez 48'; Barroso 76'; Aguado 90+2' |

Liverpool Training Centre, Liverpool
Attendance: 367
Referee: Bastien Dechepy (France)

4 November 2025
15:00

| Juventus (Italian Football Federation) | 2–2 | (Portuguese Football Federation) Sporting CP |
|---|---|---|
| Mazur 11'; Tiozzo 26' | Report | Bafdili 88'; Simão 90+1' |

Juventus Training Ground, Turin
Attendance: 421
Referee: Antoni Bandić (Bosnia and Herzegovina)

4 November 2025
16:00

| Atlético Madrid (Royal Spanish Football Federation) | 5–0 | (Royal Belgian Football Association) Union Saint-Gilloise |
|---|---|---|
| Esteban 37', 65'; Llorente 44'; Barrios 77'; Obama 80' | Report |

Centro Deportivo Wanda Alcalá de Henares, Madrid
Attendance: 392
Referee: Anton Lashuk (Belarus)

4 November 2025
16:00 (17:00 UTC+3)

| Olympiacos (Hellenic Football Federation) | 2–2 | (Royal Dutch Football Association) PSV Eindhoven |
|---|---|---|
| Toufakis 40'; Kolokotronis 49' | Report | Penso 4'; Bahaty 31' |

Olympiacos FC Training Centre, Piraeus
Attendance: 738
Referee: Stefan Ebner (Austria)

5 November 2025
12:00 (11:00 UTC+1)

| Benfica (Portuguese Football Federation) | 5–0 | (German Football Association) Bayer Leverkusen |
|---|---|---|
| Gonçalo Moreira 9', 40'; Francisco Silva 44'; Fernandes 48'; Neves 55' | Report |

Benfica Campus, Seixal
Attendance: 538
Referee: Sam Barrott (England)

5 November 2025
12:00 (14:00 UTC+4)

| Qarabağ (Association of Football Federations of Azerbaijan) | 0–5 | (The Football Association) Chelsea |
|---|---|---|
| | Report | Gordon 58'; Derry 66', 68'; Mheuka 80'; Runham 90+2' |

Qarabagh Stadium, Baku
Attendance: 278
Referee: Dmytro Kubriak (Ukraine)

5 November 2025
13:00 (14:00 UTC+3)

| Pafos (Cyprus Football Association) | 0–2 | (Royal Spanish Football Federation) Villarreal |
|---|---|---|
| | Report | Arjona 7'; Ndiaye 90+5' |

Stelios Kyriakides Stadium, Paphos
Attendance: 198
Referee: Pavle Ilić (Serbia)

5 November 2025
14:00

| Ajax (Royal Dutch Football Association) | 7–2 | (Turkish Football Federation) Galatasaray |
|---|---|---|
| Van der Vaart 28'; Unuvar 39', 56', 70'; Bouwman 43'; Nash 52'; Steur 87' | Report | Kahraman 55'; Balta 73' |

De Toekomst, Duivendrecht
Attendance: 652
Referee: Joakim Östling (Sweden)

5 November 2025
14:30

| Marseille (French Football Federation) | 0–0 | (Italian Football Federation) Atalanta |
|---|---|---|
| | Report |

Stade Francis-Turcan, Martigues
Attendance: 637
Referee: Tom Owen (Wales)

5 November 2025
15:30

| Club Brugge (Royal Belgian Football Association) | 2—0 | (Royal Spanish Football Federation) Barcelona |
|---|---|---|
| Jensen 16'; Van Britsom 89' | Report |

The NEST, Roeselare
Attendance: 2,661
Referee: Matthew MacDermid (Scotland)

5 November 2025
16:00 (15:00 UTC+1)

| Manchester City (The Football Association) | 0–3 | (German Football Association) Borussia Dortmund |
|---|---|---|
| | Report | Etcibasi 40' (pen.); Fidjeu-Tazemeta 44'; Zarqelain 90+2' |

Academy Stadium, Manchester
Attendance: 623
Referee: Matteo Marchetti (Italy)

5 November 2025
16:00

| Inter Milan (Italian Football Federation) | 3–0 | (Kazakhstan Football Federation) Kairat |
|---|---|---|
| Mosconi 21' (pen.); Zárate 37'; Iddrissou 54' | Report |

Youth Development Training Center, Milan
Attendance: 202
Referee: Alexandros Tsakalidis (Greece)

5 November 2025
16:00 (15:00 UTC+1)

| Newcastle United (The Football Association) | 2–3 | (Royal Spanish Football Federation) Athletic Bilbao |
|---|---|---|
| Neave 45' (pen.); Bailey 61' | Report | Carril 30'; Lozano 42'; Huestamendia 62' |

Whitley Park, Newcastle upon Tyne
Attendance: 447
Referee: Bence Csonka (Hungary)

=== Matchday 5 ===
25 November 2025
11:00

| Bodø/Glimt (Norwegian Football Federation) | 2–6 | (Italian Football Federation) Juventus |
|---|---|---|
| Rodahl 54'; Lukaszka 90+3' | Report | López 35', 38'; Sjong 53' (o.g.); Vallana 74'; Sosna 89'; Durmiši 90+1' |

Aspmyra Stadion, Bodø
Attendance: 350
Referee: Artem Gasparyan (Armenia)

25 November 2025
12:00 (13:00 UTC+3)

| Galatasaray (Turkish Football Federation) | 1–1 | (Royal Belgian Football Association) Union Saint-Gilloise |
|---|---|---|
| Eriş 69' | Report | Lindner 48' |

Esenler Stadium, Istanbul
Attendance: 370
Referee: Ante Čulina (Croatia)

25 November 2025
13:00

| Ajax (Royal Dutch Football Association) | 0–4 | (Portuguese Football Federation) Benfica |
|---|---|---|
| | Report | Afonso 9'; Silva 20'; Fernandes 25'; Ferreira 73' |

De Toekomst, Duivendrecht
Attendance: 897
Referee: Lothar D'hondt (Belgium)

25 November 2025
13:00

| Slavia Prague (Football Association of the Czech Republic) | 3–3 | (Royal Spanish Football Federation) Athletic Bilbao |
|---|---|---|
| Suleiman 11', 20'; Potměšil 16' | Report | Gift 8'; Lozano 43'; Oyana 90+5' (pen.) |

Sport Centre Radotin, Prague
Attendance: 487
Referee: Florian Lata (Albania)

25 November 2025
14:00 (13:00 UTC+1)

| Chelsea (The Football Association) | 1–1 | (Royal Spanish Football Federation) Barcelona |
|---|---|---|
| Rabbaj 76' | Report | Guerrero 62' |

Chelsea Football Club Training Ground, Surrey
Attendance: 278
Referee: Jakob Semler (Austria)

25 November 2025
14:00

| Napoli (Italian Football Federation) | 2–0 | (Association of Football Federations of Azerbaijan) Qarabağ |
|---|---|---|
| Raggioli 4'; Barido 82' | Report |

Giuseppe Piccolo, Cercola
Attendance: 137
Referee: Dominik Starý (Czech Republic)

25 November 2025
14:30

| Marseille (French Football Federation) | 2–0 | (The Football Association) Newcastle United |
|---|---|---|
| Remadnia 13'; Valero 90+5' | Report |

Stade Francis-Turcan, Martigues
Attendance: 524
Referee: Alexandros Tsakalidis (Greece)

25 November 2025
16:00 (15:00 UTC+1)

| Manchester City (The Football Association) | 6–0 | (German Football Association) Bayer Leverkusen |
|---|---|---|
| R. Heskey 49' (pen.); Mukasa 57', 67', 85' (pen.); McFarlane 64'; Samba 70' | Report |

Academy Stadium, Manchester
Attendance: 537
Referee: Mathieu Vernice (France)

25 November 2025
16:00

| Borussia Dortmund (German Football Association) | 1–2 | (Royal Spanish Football Federation) Villarreal |
|---|---|---|
| Tanyi 73' | Report | López 9'; Rodríguez 88' |

Dortmund Brackel Training Ground, Dortmund
Attendance: 953
Referee: Rares Vidican (Romania)

26 November 2025
13:00 (14:00 UTC+3)

| Pafos (Cyprus Football Association) | 0–3 | (French Football Federation) Monaco |
|---|---|---|
| | Report | Konaté 16'; Tincres 80'; Dodo 89' |

Stelios Kyriakides Stadium, Paphos
Attendance: 214
Referee: Aaron Wyn Jones (Wales)

26 November 2025
13:45

| Copenhagen (Danish Football Association) | 2–2 | (Kazakhstan Football Federation) Kairat |
|---|---|---|
| Frimpong 24', 90+3' | Report | Birkurmanov 7'; Bagdat 30' |

Tingbjerg Idrætspark, Copenhagen
Attendance: 250
Referee: Marius Hansen Grøtta (Norway)

26 November 2025
14:00 (13:00 UTC+1)

| Arsenal (The Football Association) | 4–2 | (German Football Association) Bayern Munich |
|---|---|---|
| Dowman 38', 90+7'; Thompson 70'; O'Neill 77' | Report | Gashi 24'; Puljić 83' |

Meadow Park, Borehamwood
Attendance: 499
Referee: Damian Kos (Poland)

26 November 2025
14:00

| Eintracht Frankfurt (German Football Association) | 3–2 | (Italian Football Federation) Atalanta |
|---|---|---|
| Staff 27', 60', 90' | Report | Baldo 48'; Mouisse 87' |

Sportpark Dreieich, Dreieich
Attendance: 879
Referee: Gal Levi (Israel)

26 November 2025
14:00 (13:00 UTC+1)

| Sporting CP (Portuguese Football Federation) | 2–1 | (Royal Belgian Football Association) Club Brugge |
|---|---|---|
| Kissanga 50'; Soares 79' | Report | Musuayi 90+2' |

Cidade do Futebol, Oeiras
Attendance: 447
Referee: Pavle Ilić (Serbia)

26 November 2025
14:30

| Paris Saint-Germain (French Football Federation) | 5–2 | (The Football Association) Tottenham Hotspur |
|---|---|---|
| Abo El Nay 21'; Nsoki 26'; Mounguengue 30'; Ayari 67', 71' | Report | Irow 33'; Rowswell 56' |

Campus PSG, Poissy
Attendance: 922
Referee: Matteo Marcenaro (Italy)

26 November 2025
15:00 (14:00 UTC+1)

| Liverpool (The Football Association) | 1–0 | (Royal Dutch Football Association) PSV Eindhoven |
|---|---|---|
| Kone-Doherty 90' | Report |

Liverpool Training Centre, Liverpool
Attendance: 187
Referee: Menelaos Antoniou (Cyprus)

26 November 2025
16:00

| Atlético Madrid (Royal Spanish Football Federation) | 4–1 | (Italian Football Federation) Inter Milan |
|---|---|---|
| Barrios 16'; Tamargo 60'; Llorente 67'; Esteban 90' | Report | Iddrissou 45' (pen.) |

Centro Deportivo Wanda Alcalá de Henares, Madrid
Attendance: 442
Referee: Szabolcs Kovacs (Romania)

26 November 2025
16:00 (17:00 UTC+3)

| Olympiacos (Hellenic Football Federation) | 0–2 | (Royal Spanish Football Federation) Real Madrid |
|---|---|---|
| | Report | Díez 78'; Martínez 90+4' |

Olympiacos FC Training Centre, Piraeus
Attendance: 1,477
Referee: Marc Nagtegaal (Netherlands)

=== Matchday 6 ===
9 December 2025
09:00 (12:00 UTC+5)

| Kairat (Kazakhstan Football Federation) | 2–0 | (Hellenic Football Federation) Olympiacos |
|---|---|---|
| Bagdat 4'; Abish 57' | Report |

FC Kairat Academy, Almaty
Attendance: 150
Referee: Giorgi Avazashvili (Georgia)

9 December 2025
13:30

| Bayern Munich (German Football Association) | 3–3 | (Portuguese Football Federation) Sporting CP |
|---|---|---|
| Gashi 7' (pen.); Cardozo 16'; Olychenko 46' | Report | Silva 20'; Taibo 79', 90+6' |

FC Bayern Campus, Munich
Attendance: 465
Referee: Daniel Higraff (Norway)

9 December 2025
14:00

| Atalanta (Italian Football Federation) | 1–3 | (The Football Association) Chelsea |
|---|---|---|
| Gasparello 34' | Report | Derry 28', 40'; Walsh 56' |

Centro Sportivo Bortolotti - Pitch 9, Bergamo
Attendance: 271
Referee: Kamal Umudlu (Azerbaijan)

9 December 2025
14:00 (13:00 UTC+1)

| Tottenham Hotspur (The Football Association) | 9–1 | (Football Association of the Czech Republic) Slavia Prague |
|---|---|---|
| Thompson 11', 38', 52'; Williams-Barnett 21', 47', 62', 77', 79'; Rowswell 84' | Report | Pikolon 40' |

Tottenham Training Centre, Enfield
Attendance: 272
Referee: Oliver Reitala (Finland)

9 December 2025
14:30

| PSV Eindhoven (Royal Dutch Football Association) | 3–1 | (Royal Spanish Football Federation) Atlético Madrid |
|---|---|---|
| Bouhamdi 45'; Merién 59'; Bizoza 65' | Report | Esteban 7' |

PSV Campus de Herdgang, Eindhoven
Attendance: 450
Referee: Karel Rouček (Czech Republic)

9 December 2025
14:30

| Union Saint-Gilloise (Royal Belgian Football Association) | 1–4 | (French Football Federation) Marseille |
|---|---|---|
| Hamoutahar 47' | Report | Valero 14'; Remadnia 57'; N'Zinga Pambani 61'; Lamare El Kadmiri 89' |

Joseph Marien Stadium, Brussels
Attendance: 463
Referee: Marek Radina (Czech Republic)

9 December 2025
15:00

| Monaco (French Football Federation) | 5–0 | (Turkish Football Federation) Galatasaray |
|---|---|---|
| Cabral 61' (pen.); Dodo 67', 82'; Konaté 71'; Tincres 78' | Report |

Stade de formation AS Monaco 1, La Turbie
Attendance: 158
Referee: Sam Barrott (England)

9 December 2025
16:00

| Inter Milan (Italian Football Federation) | 5–0 | (The Football Association) Liverpool |
|---|---|---|
| Zárate 2' (pen.); La Torre 14'; Misciur 69' (o.g.); Mosconi 76'; Moressa 84' | Report |

Youth Development Training Center, Milan
Attendance: 603
Referee: Joakim Östling (Sweden)

9 December 2025
16:00

| Barcelona (Royal Spanish Football Federation) | 4–3 | (German Football Association) Eintracht Frankfurt |
|---|---|---|
| Villar 56'; Kluivert 79', 84'; Rodríguez 90+3' | Report | Dills 21', 58'; Iličević 45+4' |

Estadi Johan Cruyff, Sant Joan Despí
Attendance: 784
Referee: Wojciech Myc (Poland)

10 December 2025
12:00 (11:00 UTC+1)

| Benfica (Portuguese Football Federation) | 3–0 | (Italian Football Federation) Napoli |
|---|---|---|
| Silva 28'; Oliveira 72'; Soares 78' | Report |

Benfica Campus, Seixal
Attendance: 392
Referee: Klym Zabroda (Ukraine)

10 December 2025
12:00

| Villarreal (Royal Spanish Football Federation) | 2–0 | (Danish Football Association) Copenhagen |
|---|---|---|
| Llopis 43'; Gaitán 90+5' | Report |

Ciudad Deportiva Villarreal CF, Villarreal
Attendance: 490
Referee: Romain Lissorgue (France)

10 December 2025
12:00 (14:00 UTC+4)

| Qarabağ (Association of Football Federations of Azerbaijan) | 0–8 | (Royal Dutch Football Association) Ajax |
|---|---|---|
| | Report | Ünüvar 32', 43', 48'; Ouazane 37', 63'; Acheampong 68', 77'; Teymurov 86' (o.g.) |

Qarabagh Stadium, Baku
Attendance: 100
Referee: Márton Rúsz (Hungary)

10 December 2025
13:00

| Athletic Bilbao (Royal Spanish Football Federation) | 1–1 | (French Football Federation) Paris Saint-Germain |
|---|---|---|
| Pérez 82' (pen.) | Report | Nsoki 46' |

Lezama Campo 2, Lezama
Attendance: 1,586
Referee: Mateo Erceg (Croatia)

10 December 2025
14:00

| Bayer Leverkusen (German Football Association) | 2–1 | (The Football Association) Newcastle United |
|---|---|---|
| Culbreath 45+4'; Pohl 52' | Report | Fitzgerald 72' |

Ulrich-Haberland-Stadion, Leverkusen
Attendance: 561
Referee: Jacob Karlsen (Denmark)

10 December 2025
15:00

| Juventus (Italian Football Federation) | 2–2 | (Cyprus Football Association) Pafos |
|---|---|---|
| Tiozzo 37', 50' | Report | Ferrer 67', 78' |

Juventus Training Ground, Turin
Attendance: 427
Referee: Emanuela Rusta (Albania)

10 December 2025
15:30

| Club Brugge (Royal Belgian Football Association) | 2–1 | (The Football Association) Arsenal |
|---|---|---|
| Musuayi 84'; Van Britsom 90+6' | Report | Agustien 7' |

The NEST, Roeselare
Attendance: 737
Referee: João Gonçalves (Portugal)

10 December 2025
16:00

| Borussia Dortmund (German Football Association) | 4–0 | (Norwegian Football Federation) Bodø/Glimt |
|---|---|---|
| Hoy 11'; Cherry 43'; Inacio 68'; Hamzath 89' | Report |

Dortmund Brackel Training Ground, Dortmund
Attendance: 634
Referee: Tess Olofsson (Sweden)

10 December 2025
16:00

| Real Madrid (Royal Spanish Football Federation) | 0–4 | (The Football Association) Manchester City |
|---|---|---|
| | Report | Gray 23'; McAidoo 70'; Heskey 84', 89' (pen.) |

Alfredo Di Stéfano Stadium, Madrid
Attendance: 656
Referee: Joonas Jaanovits (Estonia)
