= 2025–26 UEFA Youth League Domestic Champions Path =

Part of football competition

The 2025–26 UEFA Youth League Domestic Champions Path began on 17 September and ended on 10 December 2025. A total of 50 teams competed in the Domestic Champions Path to decide 10 of the 32 places in the knockout phase of the 2025–26 UEFA Youth League.

Times are CET or CEST, (Note: CEST (UTC+2) for dates up to 25 October 2025, and CET (UTC+1) for dates thereafter.) as listed by UEFA (local times, if different, are in parentheses).

== Format ==
In the Domestic Champions Path, each tie was played over two legs, with each team playing one leg at home. The team that scored more goals on aggregate over the two legs advanced to the next round. If the aggregate score was level, as the away goals rule had been scrapped, the match would be decided by a penalty shoot-out with no extra time played.

The ten third round winners advanced to the knockout phase, where they were joined by the 22 best-ranked teams from the UEFA Champions League Path.

== Round and draw dates ==
The schedule of the competition was as follows.

- For the Domestic Champions Path first and second rounds, in principle matches were played on Wednesdays (first round on matchdays 2 and 3, second round on matchdays 4 and 5, as scheduled for UEFA Champions League); however, matches could also be played on other dates, including Mondays, Tuesdays and Thursdays.

Schedule for 2025–26 UEFA Youth League
Phase	Round	Draw date	First leg	Second leg
Domestic; Champions Path	First round	1 September 2025	17 September 2025	1 October 2025
Domestic; Champions Path	Second round	1 September 2025	22 October 2025	5 November 2025
Domestic; Champions Path	Third round	1 September 2025	26 November 2025	10 December 2025

== Teams ==
The Domestic Champions Path included 50 youth domestic champions (or runners-up, if the champions qualified for the UEFA Champions League Path) and consisted of the following rounds:

- First round (20 teams): 20 teams from the 20 lower-ranked member associations according to their 2025 UEFA country coefficients.
- Second round (40 teams): 30 teams from the top 30 member associations according to UEFA country coefficients, and 10 winners of the first round.
- Third round (20 teams): 20 winners of the second round.

Below are the participating teams of the Domestic Champions Path, grouped by their starting rounds.

Key to colours
Winners of third round advanced to knockout phase

Second round Team (England) Aston Villa (Italy) Fiorentina (Spain) Real Betis (Germany) 1. FC Köln (France) Nantes (Netherlands) AZ (Portugal) Porto (Belgium) Genk (Turkey) Trabzonspor (Czech Republic) Baník Ostrava (Scotland) Hibernian (Switzerland) Basel Austria Wien (Norway) Brann (Greece) PAOK (Denmark) Midtjylland (Israel) Maccabi Haifa (Ukraine) Dynamo Kyiv (Serbia) Red Star Belgrade (Croatia) Lokomotiva Zagreb (Poland) Legia Warsaw (Cyprus) AEK Larnaca (Hungary) Puskás Akadémia (Sweden) Brommapojkarna (Romania) FCSB (Bulgaria) Ludogorets Razgrad (Azerbaijan) Sabah (Slovakia) Žilina (Slovenia) Bravo (Kosovo) 2 Korriku	First round Team (Kazakhstan) Ordabasy (Finland) HJK (Republic of Ireland) Shelbourne (Latvia) Jelgava (Faroe Islands) Víkingur (Bosnia and Herzegovina) Zrinjski Mostar (Iceland) KA (Northern Ireland) Larne (Luxembourg) Racing Union (Lithuania) Be1 (Malta) Naxxar Lions (Georgia (country)) Dinamo Tbilisi (Albania) Skënderbeu (Estonia) Narva Trans (Belarus) Dinamo Minsk (North Macedonia) Rabotnichki (Andorra) Inter Club d'Escaldes (Wales) Haverfordwest County (Montenegro) Budućnost Podgorica (Gibraltar) Lincoln Red Imps

== First round ==
=== Draw ===
The draw for the first round was held on 1 September 2025.

Group 1	Group 2	Group 3	Group 4
(Bosnia and Herzegovina) Zrinjski Mostar; (Belarus) Dinamo Minsk; (Georgia (country)) Dinamo Tbilisi; (Kazakhstan) Ordabasy	(Montenegro) Budućnost Podgorica; (Republic of Ireland) Shelbourne; (Northern Ireland) Larne; (Luxembourg) Racing Union; (North Macedonia) Rabotnichki; (Wales) Haverfordwest	(Finland) HJK Helsinki; (Latvia) FK Jelgava; (Faroe Islands) Víkingur; (Iceland) Akureyri; (Lithuania) FK Be1; (Estonia) Narva Trans	(Malta) Naxxar Lions; (Albania) Skënderbeu; (Andorra) Inter Club d'Escaldes; (Gibraltar) Lincoln Red Imps

=== Summary ===
The first legs were played on 17, 18 and 26 September, and the second legs on 30 September and 1 October 2025.

The winners of the ties advanced to the second round.

First round
Team 1	Agg.	Team 2	1st leg	2nd leg
Ordabasy (Kazakhstan)	1–3	(Belarus) Dinamo Minsk	1–1	0–2
Zrinjski Mostar (Bosnia and Herzegovina)	1–4	(Georgia (country)) Dinamo Tbilisi	1–1	0–3
Shelbourne (Republic of Ireland)	12–1	(North Macedonia) Rabotnichki	5–0	7–1
Larne (Northern Ireland)	3–3 (4–5 p)	(Luxembourg) Racing Union	2–0	1–3
Haverfordwest (Wales)	3–5	(Montenegro) Budućnost Podgorica	2–3	1–2
FK Be1 (Lithuania)	1–5	(Finland) HJK Helsinki	1–1	0–4
Narva Trans (Estonia)	2–4	(Faroe Islands) Víkingur	1–0	1–4
FK Jelgava (Latvia)	2–3	(Iceland) Akureyri	2–2	0–1
Inter Club d'Escaldes (Andorra)	0–15	(Albania) Skënderbeu	0–10	0–5
Naxxar Lions (Malta)	1–6	(Gibraltar) Lincoln Red Imps	0–2	1–4

=== Matches ===
26 September 2025
13:00 (16:00 UTC+5)

Ordabasy (Kazakhstan)	1–1	(Belarus) Dinamo Minsk
Gamayunov 79'	Report	Molchan 78' (pen.)

Namys Stadium, Shymkent
Attendance: 2,500
Referee: Kamal Umudlu (Azerbaijan)
30 September 2025
11:30 (14:30 UTC+5)

Dinamo Minsk (Belarus)	2–0	(Kazakhstan) Ordabasy
Beinia 49'; Lutskovich 65' (pen.)	Report

Namys Stadium, Shymkent, Kazakhstan (Note: Due to the country's involvement in the Russian invasion of Ukraine, Belarusian teams were required to play their home matches at neutral venues and behind closed doors until further notice.)
Attendance: 0
Referee: Jovan Kachevski (North Macedonia)

Dinamo Minsk won 3–1 on aggregate.

17 September 2025
18:30

Zrinjski Mostar (Bosnia and Herzegovina)	1–1	(Georgia (country)) Dinamo Tbilisi
Karačić 69'	Report	Danelia 32'

Stadium Perica-Pero Pavlović, Gabela
Attendance: 400
Referee: Wojciech Myc (Poland)
1 October 2025
18:00 (20:00 UTC+4)

Dinamo Tbilisi (Georgia (country))	3–0	(Bosnia and Herzegovina) Zrinjski Mostar
Doltmourziev 8', 56'; Odikadze 50'	Report

Boris Paichadze Dinamo Arena, Tbilisi
Attendance: 2,240
Referee: Ashot Ghaltakhchyan (Armenia)

Dinamo Tbilisi won 4–1 on aggregate.

17 September 2025
20:45 (19:45 UTC+1)

Shelbourne (Republic of Ireland)	5–0	(North Macedonia) Rabotnichki
Sammy 35'; Mare 69', 71'; Ryan 76'; Keogh 84'	Report

Tolka Park, Dublin
Attendance: 814
Referee: Ross Hardie (Scotland)
1 October 2025
16:00

Rabotnichki (North Macedonia)	1–7	(Republic of Ireland) Shelbourne
Boshnakov 44'	Report	Sammy 6', 39', 80'; Bailey 49', 78'; Wuna 53'; McCarthy 61'

FFM Training Centre, Skopje
Attendance: 150
Referee: Marek Radina (Czech Republic)

Shelbourne won 12–1 on aggregate.

17 September 2025
20:30 (19:30 UTC+1)

Larne (Northern Ireland)	2–0	(Luxembourg) Racing Union
Jenkins 30'; Eakin 57'	Report

The Showgrounds, Ballymena
Attendance: 243
Referee: Dominik Starý (Czech Republic)
1 October 2025
18:30

Racing Union (Luxembourg)	3–1	(Northern Ireland) Larne
Giesteira 7'; Bisevac 39' (pen.); Yans 51'	Report	McAllster 10' (pen.)
Penalties
Carriez (penalty scored); Mahi (penalty scored); Garcia (penalty scored); Giesteira (penalty scored); Bisevac (penalty scored)	5–4	(penalty scored) McKervey; (penalty scored) McAllster; (penalty scored) Gordon; (penalty scored) Simpson; (penalty missed) Harkin

Stade Achille Hammerel, Luxembourg City
Attendance: 315
Referee: Jóhan Hendrik Ellefsen (Faroe Islands)

3–3 on aggregate; Racing Union won 5–4 on penalties.

17 September 2025
20:45 (19:45 UTC+1)

Haverfordwest (Wales)	2–3	(Montenegro) Budućnost Podgorica
Watkins 26'; James 32'	Report	Roćenović 3'; Fatić 63' (pen.); Vujović 87'

Bridge Meadow, Haverfordwest
Attendance: 671
Referee: Jacob Karlsen (Denmark)
30 September 2025
18:00

Budućnost Podgorica (Montenegro)	2–1	(Wales) Haverfordwest
Jašović 45+1'; Roćenović 45+4'	Report	Vaughan-Harries 2'

Podgorica City Stadium, Podgorica
Attendance: 650
Referee: Giorgi Avazashvili (Georgia)

Budućnost Podgorica won 5–3 on aggregate.

17 September 2025
17:30 (18:30 UTC+3)

FK Be1 (Lithuania)	1–1	(Finland) HJK Helsinki
Gutauskas 60'	Report	Berisha 81'

Darius and Girėnas Stadium, Kaunas
Attendance: 723
Referee: Antoine Chiaramonti (Andorra)
1 October 2025
17:30 (18:30 UTC+3)

HJK Helsinki (Finland)	4–0	(Lithuania) FK Be1
De Nascimento 8'; Mero 29'; Nylund 43'; Berisha 61'	Report

Helsinki Olympic Stadium, Helsinki
Attendance: 451
Referee: Roman Jitari (Moldova)

HJK Helsinki won 5–1 on aggregate.

18 September 2025
16:45 (17:45 UTC+3)

Narva Trans (Estonia)	1–0	(Faroe Islands) Víkingur
Baljabkin 4'	Report

Sportland Arena, Tallinn
Attendance: 140
Referee: Marius Hansen Grøtta (Norway)
1 October 2025
19:00 (18:00 UTC+1)

Víkingur (Faroe Islands)	4–1	(Estonia) Narva Trans
Á Líðarenda 34'; Brandsson 51'; Bacalso 55'; Á Reynatrøð 81'	Report	Baljabkin 74'

Tórsvøllur, Tórshavn
Attendance: 259
Referee: Alexandros Tsakalidis (Greece)

Víkingur won 4–2 on aggregate.

17 September 2025
15:00 (16:00 UTC+3)

FK Jelgava (Latvia)	2–2	(Iceland) Akureyri
Laķis 17'; Muiznieks 25'	Report	Sævarsson 57' (pen.); Finnbogason 83'

Zemgale Olympic Center, Jelgava
Attendance: 367
Referee: Mateo Erceg (Croatia)
1 October 2025
16:00 (14:00 UTC+0)

Akureyri (Iceland)	1–0	(Latvia) FK Jelgava
Ellertsson 28'	Report

KA-Völlur, Akureyri
Attendance: 437
Referee: Karl Koppel (Estonia)

Akureyri won 3–2 on aggregate.

17 September 2025
14:30

Inter Club d'Escaldes (Andorra)	0–10	(Albania) Skënderbeu
	Report	Korçari 3', 49', 78', 86'; Beqiri 20', 34'; Begaj 44'; Tahid 72', 80', 90+3'

Estadi Nacional, Andorra la Vella
Attendance: 122
Referee: Bence Csonka (Hungary)
1 October 2025
16:00

Skënderbeu (Albania)	5–0	(Andorra) Inter Club d'Escaldes
Pinto 3' (o.g.); Nasto 7'; Shkembi 26'; Korçari 40', 86' (pen.)	Report

Skënderbeu Stadium, Korçë
Attendance: 350
Referee: Simon Bourdeaud'hui (Belgium)

Skënderbeu won 15–0 on aggregate.

17 September 2025
16:00

Naxxar Lions (Malta)	0–2	(Gibraltar) Lincoln Red Imps
	Report	Desoiza 45', 67'

Gozo Stadium, Gozo
Attendance: 280
Referee: Oguzhan Çakir (Turkey)
1 October 2025
19:00

Lincoln Red Imps (Gibraltar)	4–1	(Malta) Naxxar Lions
Peacock 27' (pen.); L. Chipolina 42', 44', 55' (pen.)	Report	Scicluna 33'

Europa Sports Park, Gibraltar
Attendance: 555
Referee: Jérémy Muller (Luxembourg)

Lincoln Red Imps won 6–1 on aggregate.

== Second round ==
The draw for the second round was held on 1 September 2025.

Group 1	Group 2	Group 3	Group 4
(Spain) Real Betis; (Portugal) Porto; (Switzerland) Basel; Austria Wien; (Israel) Maccabi Haifa; (Cyprus) AEK Larnaca; (Bulgaria) Ludogorets Razgrad; (Slovenia) Bravo	(Germany) 1. FC Köln; (France) Nantes; (Czech Republic) Baník Ostrava; (Denmark) Midtjylland; (Serbia) Red Star Belgrade; (Azerbaijan) Sabah; (Slovakia) Žilina	(Italy) Fiorentina; (Belgium) Genk; (Turkey) Trabzonspor; (Greece) PAOK; (Croatia) Lokomotiva Zagreb; (Poland) Legia Warsaw; (Romania) FCSB	(England) Aston Villa; (Netherlands) AZ; (Scotland) Hibernian; (Norway) Brann; (Ukraine) Dynamo Kyiv; (Hungary) Puskás Akadémia; (Sweden) Brommapojkarna; (Kosovo) 2 Korriku

=== Summary ===
The first legs were played on 21, 22 & 23 October and 1 November, and the second legs on 4 & 5 November 2025.

The winners of the ties advanced to the third round.

Second round
Team 1	Agg.	Team 2	1st leg	2nd leg
Dinamo Minsk (Belarus)	2–1	(Bulgaria) Ludogorets Razgrad	0–1	2–0
AEK Larnaca (Cyprus)	3–6	(Georgia (country)) Dinamo Tbilisi	3–4	0–2
Bravo (Slovenia)	1–8	(Portugal) Porto	0–4	1–4
Basel (Switzerland)	3–4	(Spain) Real Betis	3–2	0–2
Austria Wien	2–4	(Israel) Maccabi Haifa	1–1	1–3
Nantes (France)	7–1	(Azerbaijan) Sabah	5–0	2–1
Baník Ostrava (Czech Republic)	1–4	(Serbia) Red Star Belgrade	0–0	1–4
Žilina (Slovakia)	2–2 (2–0 p)	(Republic of Ireland) Shelbourne	2–2	0–0
Racing Union (Luxembourg)	1–5	(Germany) 1. FC Köln	0–3	1–2
Midtjylland (Denmark)	8–1	(Montenegro) Budućnost Podgorica	3–0	5–1
HJK Helsinki (Finland)	3–2	(Turkey) Trabzonspor	2–2	1–0
Víkingur (Faroe Islands)	1–11	(Belgium) Genk	0–8	1–3
Akureyri (Iceland)	0–4	(Greece) PAOK	0–2	0–2
Legia Warsaw (Poland)	6–4	(Italy) Fiorentina	4–1	2–3
Lokomotiva Zagreb (Croatia)	4–6	(Romania) FCSB	2–3	2–3
Brann (Norway)	1–1 (1–3 p)	(Hungary) Puskás Akadémia	1–1	0–0
Dynamo Kyiv (Ukraine)	3–1	(Sweden) Brommapojkarna	1–0	2–1
Hibernian (Scotland)	4–1	(Kosovo) 2 Korriku	4–0	0–1
Skënderbeu (Albania)	1–7	(England) Aston Villa	1–1	0–6
AZ (Netherlands)	9–0	(Gibraltar) Lincoln Red Imps	4–0	5–0

=== Matches ===
1 November 2025
16:00 (18:00 UTC+3)

Dinamo Minsk (Belarus)	0–1	(Bulgaria) Ludogorets Razgrad
	Report	Penev 31'

Eagles Nest Stadium, Razgrad, Bulgaria
Attendance: 0
Referee: Mikkel Redder (Denmark)
5 November 2025
17:00 (18:00 UTC+2)

Ludogorets Razgrad (Bulgaria)	0–2	(Belarus) Dinamo Minsk
	Report	Molchan 66'; Grabtsevich 87'

Eagles Nest Stadium, Razgrad
Attendance: 389
Referee: Ante Čulina (Croatia)

Dinamo Minsk won 2–1 on aggregate.

22 October 2025
13:30 (14:30 UTC+3)

AEK Larnaca (Cyprus)	3–4	(Georgia (country)) Dinamo Tbilisi
Loukaidis 13'; Thoma 30'; Kanelopoullos 67'	Report	Danelia 25'; Tcholokava 51'; Doltmourziev 59' (pen.); Odikadze 69'

Ammochostos Stadium, Larnaca
Attendance: 325
Referee: Simon Bourdeaud'hui (Belgium)
5 November 2025
15:00 (18:00 UTC+4)

Dinamo Tbilisi (Georgia (country))	2–0	(Cyprus) AEK Larnaca
Danelia 42'; Doltmourziev 54'	Report

Boris Paichadze Dinamo Arena, Tbilisi
Attendance: 2,500
Referee: Dzmitry Dzmitryieu (Belarus)

Dinamo Tbilisi won 6–3 on aggregate.

22 October 2025
18:00

Bravo (Slovenia)	0–4	(Portugal) Porto
	Report	Lima 15', 68'; Miranda 23'; Carvalho 39'

Športni center Kranj, Kranj
Attendance: 900
Referee: Rares Vidican (Romania)
5 November 2025
16:00 (15:00 UTC+0)

Porto (Portugal)	4–1	(Slovenia) Bravo
Silva 5' (pen.); Ferreira 45+1', 67'; Miranda 51'	Report	Kopatin 13'

Estádio Municipal Jorge Sampaio, Porto
Attendance: 301
Referee: Oguzhan Çakir (Türkiye)

Porto won 8–1 on aggregate.

22 October 2025
19:00

Basel (Switzerland)	3–2	(Spain) Real Betis
Garcia 28'; Koloto 43'; Rexhaj 60'	Report	Marina 8'; Navarro 18'

Leichtathletik Stadion St. Jakob, Basel
Attendance: 3,500
Referee: Marius Hansen Grøtta (Norway)
5 November 2025
16:00

Real Betis (Spain)	2–0	(Switzerland) Basel
De Roa 30'; Marina 64'	Report

Ciudad Deportiva Luis del Sol, Seville
Attendance: 703
Referee: Oscar Johnson (Sweden)

Real Betis won 4–3 on aggregate.

22 October 2025
15:30

Austria Wien	1–1	(Israel) Maccabi Haifa
Lukic 38'	Report	Darzi 14'

FK Austria Wien-Akademie, Vienna
Attendance: 584
Referee: Jovan Kachevski (North Macedonia)
5 November 2025
15:30 (17:30 UTC+3)

Maccabi Haifa (Israel)	3–1	Austria Wien
Grimberg 2'; Amir 68'; Sztejfman 86'	Report	Maybach 63'

Gyirmóti Stadion, Győr, Hungary (Note: Due to the Gaza war, Israeli teams were required to play their home matches at neutral venues until further notice.)
Attendance: 0
Referee: Sven Wolfensberger (Switzerland)

Maccabi Haifa won 4–2 on aggregate.

22 October 2025
17:00

Nantes (France)	5–0	(Azerbaijan) Sabah
Fall 4'; Kone 18'; Nzita 23'; Raiani 45'; Djonda 80'	Report

Stade Marcel-Saupin, Nantes
Attendance: 1,750
Referee: Ishmael Barbara (Malta)
5 November 2025
14:00 (17:00 UTC+4)

Sabah (Azerbaijan)	1–2	(France) Nantes
Huseynov 88'	Report	Dabo 17' (pen.), 76' (pen.)

Alinja Stadium, Masazir
Attendance: 250
Referee: Danilo Nikolić (Serbia)

Nantes won 7–1 on aggregate.

22 October 2025
14:30

Baník Ostrava (Czech Republic)	0–0	(Serbia) Red Star Belgrade
	Report

Městský stadion, Ostrava
Attendance: 2,164
Referee: Igor Stojchevski (North Macedonia)
5 November 2025
13:00

Red Star Belgrade (Serbia)	4–1	(Czech Republic) Baník Ostrava
Šarić 18', 53'; Stojanović 67'; Trač 88'	Report	Zástřešek 25'

Stadium Rajko Mitić, Belgrade
Attendance: 520
Referee: Lothar D'hondt (Belgium)

Red Star Belgrade won 4–1 on aggregate.

22 October 2025
16:30

Žilina (Slovakia)	2–2	(Republic of Ireland) Shelbourne
Pališčák 18'; Staník 23'	Report	Staník 58' (o.g.); Sammy 71'

Štadión MŠK Žilina, Žilina
Attendance: 2,380
Referee: Klym Zabroda (Ukraine)
5 November 2025
20:45 (19:45 UTC+0)

Shelbourne (Republic of Ireland)	0–0	(Slovakia) Žilina
	Report
Penalties
Sammy (penalty missed); Mare (penalty missed); Roche (penalty missed); Cailloce (penalty missed)	0–2	(penalty scored) Strucka; (penalty missed) Kosa; (penalty missed) Kmeť; (penalty scored) Yendare

Tolka Park, Dublin
Attendance: 614
Referee: Lukasz Kuzma (Poland)

2–2 on aggregate; Žilina won 2–0 on penalties.

22 October 2025
18:30

Racing Union (Luxembourg)	0–3	(Germany) 1. FC Köln
	Report	Schenten 20'; Neumann 60'; Puzzo 78'

Stade Achille Hammerel, Luxembourg City
Attendance: 1,500
Referee: Amine Kourgheli (Belarus)
5 November 2025
18:00

1. FC Köln (Germany)	2–1	(Luxembourg) Racing Union
Schenten 17'; Puzzo 23'	Report	Messan 18'

Franz-Kremer-Stadion, Cologne
Attendance: 4,974
Referee: Jacob Karlsen (Denmark)

1. FC Köln won 5–1 on aggregate.

22 October 2025
14:00

Midtjylland (Denmark)	3–0	(Montenegro) Budućnost Podgorica
Lodberg 30'; Pimpong 64'; Skyttehave 89'	Report

Ikast Stadium, Ikast
Attendance: 341
Referee: Aaron Wyn Jones (Wales)
5 November 2025
17:00

Budućnost Podgorica (Montenegro)	1–5	(Denmark) Midtjylland
Kracković 63'	Report	Amini 7'; Emefile 20'; Pimpong 40', 45+2' (pen/); Alphinas 90+2'

Podgorica City Stadium, Podgorica
Attendance: 758
Referee: Ilioski Vlatko (North Macedonia)

Midtjylland won 8–1 on aggregate.

23 October 2025
17:30

HJK Helsinki (Finland)	2–2	(Turkey) Trabzonspor
Konttas 4'; Mero 90'	Report	Çakiroğlu 45+4', 81'

Helsinki Football Stadium, Helsinki
Attendance: 812
Referee: Aleko Aptsiauri (Georgia)
5 November 2025
18:00 (19:00 UTC+3)

Trabzonspor (Turkey)	0–1	(Finland) HJK Helsinki
	Report	Mero 58'

Şenol Güneş Sports Complex, Trabzon
Attendance: 2,498
Referee: Patryk Gryckiewicz (Poland)

HJK Helsinki won 3–2 on aggregate.

22 October 2025
20:00 (19:00 UTC+1)

Víkingur (Faroe Islands)	0–8	(Belgium) Genk
	Report	Achahbar 5', 66'; Decresson 7', 37'; Murenzi 12', 27'; Driessen 89'; Ouazzani 90+1'

Tórsvøllur, Tórshavn
Attendance: 228
Referee: Ilioski Vlatko (North Macedonia)
4 November 2025
17:00

Genk (Belgium)	3–1	(Faroe Islands) Víkingur
Ogbeiwi 8'; Rabhi 73'; De Groof 90+1'	Report	Samsson 85'

Cegeka Arena, Genk
Attendance: 248
Referee: Amine Kourgheli (Belarus)

Genk won 11–1 on aggregate.

22 October 2025
18:00 (17:00 UTC+1)

Akureyri (Iceland)	0–2	(Greece) PAOK
	Report	Toursounidis 7', 52'

Boginn Stadium, Akureyri
Attendance: 386
Referee: Granit Maqedonci (Sweden)
5 November 2025
16:30 (17:30 UTC+1)

PAOK (Greece)	2–0	(Iceland) Akureyri
Aretis 85', 89'	Report

Serres Municipal Stadium, Serres
Attendance: 500

PAOK won 4–0 on aggregate.

22 October 2025
12:00

Legia Warsaw (Poland)	4–1	(Italy) Fiorentina
Mizera 7'; Pchełka 10'; Kováčik 19', 60'	Report	Mazzeo 1'

Legia Training Center, Książenice
Attendance: 350
Referee: Mehmet Türkmen (Türkiye)
5 November 2025
15:00

Fiorentina (Italy)	3–2	(Poland) Legia Warsaw
Trapani 15'; Evangelista 32'; Maiorana 84'	Report	Kováčik 12'; Maiorana 74' (o.g.)

Curva Fiesole, Florence
Attendance: 165
Referee: Igor Stojchevski (North Macedonia)

Legia Warsaw won 6–4 on aggregate.

22 October 2025
12:00

Lokomotiva Zagreb (Croatia)	2–3	(Romania) FCSB
Kralevski 60'; Tomeljak 80'	Report	Ilie 28'; Colibășanu 33'; Popa 69'

Gradski stadion, Sisak
Attendance: 150
Referee: Igor Bosca (Moldova)
5 November 2025
13:00 (14:00 UTC+2)

FCSB (Romania)	3–2	(Croatia) Lokomotiva Zagreb
Necșulescu 23'; Popa 39'; Toma 59'	Report	Godec 47'; Utrobičić 90'

Football Centre FRF, Buftea
Attendance: 250
Referee: Zorbay Küçük (Türkiye)

FCSB won 6–4 on aggregate.

22 October 2025
18:00

Brann (Norway)	1–1	(Hungary) Puskás Akadémia
Lægreid 33'	Report	Gustei 54'

Åsane Arena, Bergen
Attendance: 314
Referee: Ross Hardie (Scotland)
5 November 2025
16:30

Puskás Akadémia (Hungary)	0–0	(Norway) Brann
	Report
Penalties
Umathum (penalty missed); Krupa (penalty scored); Tóth (penalty scored); Pál (penalty scored)	3–1	(penalty missed) Haga; (penalty scored) Eikrem; (penalty missed) Vindenes; (penalty missed) Børtveit

Pancho Aréna, Felcsút
Attendance: 670
Referee: Giorgi Avazashvili (Georgia)

1–1 on aggregate; Puskás Akadémia won 3–1 on penalties.

22 October 2025
13:00 (14:00 UTC+3)

Dynamo Kyiv (Ukraine)	1–0	(Sweden) Brommapojkarna
Zakharchenko 45+4'	Report

Stal Stalowa Wola Stadium, Stalowa Wola, Poland (Note: Due to the Russian invasion of Ukraine, Ukrainian teams were required to play their home matches at neutral venues until further notice.)
Attendance: 105
Referee: Wojciech Myc (Poland)
5 November 2025
18:00

Brommapojkarna (Sweden)	1–2	(Ukraine) Dynamo Kyiv
Nildén 89'	Report	Andreiko 16'; Ivaskiv 82'

Grimsta IP, Bromma
Attendance: 810
Referee: Ashot Ghaltakhchyan (Armenia)

Dynamo Kyiv won 3–1 on aggregate.

22 October 2025
20:45 (19:45 UTC+1)

Hibernian (Scotland)	4–0	(Kosovo) 2 Korriku
Molotnikov 11'; McMurdo 67'; Davidson 74'; Gillie 78'	Report

Easter Road, Edinburgh
Attendance: 1,411
Referee: Joakim Östling (Sweden)
5 November 2025
19:00

2 Korriku (Kosovo)	1–0	(Scotland) Hibernian
Shala 3'	Report

Zahir Pajaziti Stadium, Podujevë
Attendance: 153
Referee: Dominik Starý (Czechia)

Hibernian won 4–1 on aggregate.

21 October 2025
10:00

Skënderbeu (Albania)	1–1	(England) Aston Villa
Beqiri 41'	Report	Wilson 37'

Skënderbeu Stadium, Korçë
Attendance: 1,200
Referee: Antoine Chiaramonti (Andorra)
5 November 2025
14:00 (13:00 UTC+0)

Aston Villa (England)	6–0	(Albania) Skënderbeu
Wilson 4', 34', 73'; Carroll 18'; McGrath 38', 70'	Report

Bodymoor Heath Training Ground, Warwickshire
Attendance: 380
Referee: Kevin O'Sullivan (Ireland)

Aston Villa won 7–1 on aggregate.

21 October 2025
12:00

AZ (Netherlands)	4–0	(Gibraltar) Lincoln Red Imps
Kovács 28', 45+2'; Saffoe 48'; Zekri 54' (pen.)	Report

AZ Training Centre, Wijdewormer
Attendance: 495
Referee: Joni Hyytiä (Finland)
4 November 2025
19:00

Lincoln Red Imps (Gibraltar)	0–5	(Netherlands) AZ
	Report	Hellings 1'; Kovács 17', 32'; Sijbrands 20'; Van Der Velde 65'

Europa Sports Park, Gibraltar
Attendance: 532
Referee: Mateo Erceg (Croatia)

AZ won 9–0 on aggregate.

== Third round ==
=== Summary ===
The first legs were played on 25 & 26 November–5 December, and the second legs on 9 & 10 December 2025.

The winners of the ties advanced to the knockout phase.

Third round
Team 1	Agg.	Team 2	1st leg	2nd leg
Dinamo Minsk (Belarus)	2–2 (4–2 p)	(Georgia (country)) Dinamo Tbilisi	0–2	2–0
Porto (Portugal)	0–9	(Spain) Real Betis	0–4	0–5
Maccabi Haifa (Israel)	4–2	(France) Nantes	1–0	3–2
Red Star Belgrade (Serbia)	3–3 (6–7 p)	(Slovakia) Žilina	3–1	0–2
1. FC Köln (Germany)	5–2	(Denmark) Midtjylland	1–1	4–1
HJK Helsinki (Finland)	3–2	(Belgium) Genk	1–0	2–2
Legia Warsaw (Poland)	4–2	(Greece) PAOK	2–1	2–1
FCSB (Romania)	4–4 (2–4 p)	(Hungary) Puskás Akadémia	1–2	3–2
Dynamo Kyiv (Ukraine)	2–1	(Scotland) Hibernian	1–0	1–1
Aston Villa (England)	3–4	(Netherlands) AZ	2–2	1–2

=== Matches ===
5 December 2025
13:00 (16:00 UTC+4)

Dinamo Minsk (Belarus)	0–2	(Georgia (country)) Dinamo Tbilisi
	Report	Doltmourziev 12'; Gvasalia 17'

Boris Paichadze National Stadium, Tbilisi, Georgia
Attendance: 1
Referee: Igor Bosca (Moldova)
10 December 2025

Dinamo Tbilisi (Georgia (country))	0–2	(Belarus) Dinamo Minsk
	Report	Vaskaboinikau 56'; Zhechko 68'
Penalties
Doltmurziev (penalty scored); Natenadze (penalty missed); Diakonidze (penalty missed); Mikautadze (penalty scored)	2–4	(penalty scored) Lutskovich; (penalty scored) Serada; (penalty scored) Grabtsevich; (penalty scored) Leantsiuk

Boris Paichadze National Stadium, Tbilisi
Attendance: 3,270
Referee: Sayat Karabayev (Kazakhstan)

2–2 on aggregate; Dinamo Minsk won 4–2 on penalties.

26 November 2025

Porto (Portugal)	0–4	(Spain) Real Betis
	Report	Marina 15'; Gonzalez 21', 34'; Oya 86'

Estádio Municipal Jorge Sampaio, Vila Nova de Gaia
Attendance: 337
Referee: Stefan Ebner (Austria)
10 December 2025

Real Betis (Spain)	5–0	(Portugal) Porto
Marina 19', 34'; De Sa Abreu 51'; Cordón 70'; Mora 90'	Report

Ciudad Deportiva Luis del Sol, Seville
Attendance: 370
Referee: Simon Bourdeaud'hui (Belgium)

Real Betis won 9–0 on aggregate.

26 November 2025

Maccabi Haifa (Israel)	1–0	(France) Nantes
Gabay 51'	Report

Gyirmóti Stadion, Győr, Hungary
Referee: Christos Vergetis (Greece)
10 December 2025

Nantes (France)	2–3	(Israel) Maccabi Haifa
Gautier 41'; Dago 89'	Report	Karagola 4'; Grimberg 79'; Levy 83'

Stade de la Beaujoire, Nantes
Attendance: 273
Referee: Igor Stojchevski (North Macedonia)

Maccabi Haifa won 4–2 on aggregate.

26 November 2025

Red Star Belgrade (Serbia)	3–1	(Slovakia) Žilina
Šarić 12', 56'; Djorđević 37'	Report	Baleja 22'

Stadium Rajko Mitić - Youth stadium, Belgrade
Attendance: 300
Referee: Ishmael Barbara (Malta)
10 December 2025

Žilina (Slovakia)	2–0	(Serbia) Red Star Belgrade
Baleja 33', 69'	Report
Penalties
Kosa (penalty scored); Okal (penalty scored); Staník (penalty missed); Byzdl (penalty scored); Yendare (penalty scored); Baleja (penalty scored); Pališčák (penalty scored); Stručka (penalty scored)	7–6	(penalty scored) Ristovski; (penalty scored) Petrovic; (penalty scored) Anokić; (penalty missed) Mišić; (penalty scored) Đorđević; (penalty scored) Roganović; (penalty scored) Stojanović; (penalty missed) Ivković

Štadión MŠK Žilina, Žilina
Attendance: 2,029
Referee: Ben Mcmaster (Northern Ireland)

3–3 on aggregate; Žilina won 7–6 on penalties.

26 November 2025

1. FC Köln (Germany)	1–1	(Denmark) Midtjylland
Schenten 49'	Report	Emefile 44'

Franz-Kremer-Stadion, Cologne
Attendance: 4,190
Referee: Roman Jitari (Moldova)
10 December 2025

Midtjylland (Denmark)	1–4	(Germany) 1. FC Köln
Pimpong 47'	Report	Schenten 25', 65'; Irmiev 50'; Völp 82'

Ikast Stadion, Ikast
Attendance: 763
Referee: Matthew MacDermid (Scotland)

1. FC Köln won 5–2 on aggregate.

26 November 2025

HJK Helsinki (Finland)	1–0	(Belgium) Genk
Mero 17' (pen.)	Report

Helsinki Football Stadium, Helsinki
Attendance: 1,199
Referee: Jamie Robinson (Northern Ireland)
10 December 2025

Genk (Belgium)	2–2	(Finland) HJK Helsinki
Cauwel 25'; Achahbar 54'	Report	Mero 69' (pen.), 90+2'

KRC Genk Arena - Stadium B, Genk
Attendance: 414
Referee: Bastien Dechepy (France)

HJK Helsinki won 3–2 on aggregate.

25 November 2025
12:00

Legia Warsaw (Poland)	2–1	(Greece) PAOK
Kováčik 1', 41'	Report	Gjoka 79'

Legia Training Center, Książenice
Attendance: 152
Referee: Aleko Aptsiauri (Georgia)
9 December 2025

PAOK (Greece)	1–2	(Poland) Legia Warsaw
Stylos 54'	Report	Piasta 75'; Kováčik 83'

Toumba Stadium, Thessaloniki
Attendance: 3,491
Referee: David Dickinson (Scotland)

Legia Warsaw won 4–2 on aggregate.

26 November 2025

FCSB (Romania)	1–2	(Hungary) Puskás Akadémia
Stoian 49'	Report	Varga 58'; Krupa 72'

Football Centre FRF, Buftea
Attendance: 300
Referee: Ilioski Vlatko (North Macedonia)
10 December 2025

Puskás Akadémia (Hungary)	2–3	(Romania) FCSB
Ásványi 4'; Zahorán 17'	Report	Popa 1', 28'; Panait 11'
Penalties
Pál (penalty missed); Magyarics (penalty scored); Varga (penalty scored); Tóth (penalty scored); Ásványi (penalty scored)	4–2	(penalty scored) Stoian; (penalty missed) Ilie; (penalty scored) Manolache; (penalty missed) Necşulescu

Pancho Aréna, Felcsút
Attendance: 1,022
Referee: Mervan Bejtullahu (Kosovo)

4–4 on aggregate; Puskás Akadémia won 4–2 on penalties.

26 November 2025

Dynamo Kyiv (Ukraine)	1–0	(Scotland) Hibernian
Zakharchenko 56'	Report

Stal Stalowa Wola Stadium, Stalowa Wola, Poland
Attendance: 40
Referee: Helgi Mikael Jónasson (Iceland)
10 December 2025

Hibernian (Scotland)	1–1	(Ukraine) Dynamo Kyiv
Clelland 51'	Report	Osypenko 54'

Easter Road Stadium, Edinburgh
Attendance: 1,420
Referee: Granit Maqedonci (Sweden)

Dynamo Kyiv won 2–1 on aggregate.

26 November 2025

Aston Villa (England)	2–2	(Netherlands) AZ
Wilson 21'; Burrowes 55'	Report	T. de Wit 28'; H. de Wit 89'

Aston Villa FC Training Ground, Tamworth
Attendance: 139
Referee: Peter Kralović (Slovakia)
9 December 2025

AZ (Netherlands)	2–1	(England) Aston Villa
Budko 38'; T. de Wit 56'	Report	Jimoh-Aloba 15'

AZ Training Centre, Wijdewormer
Attendance: 1,200
Referee: Amine Kourgheli (Belarus)

AZ won 4–3 on aggregate.
