= Jesús Barrios =

Jesús Barrios may refer to:

- Jesús Barrios (footballer, born 1961), Colombian football manager and former forward
- Jesús Barrios (footballer, born 2006), Spanish football winger for Atlético Madrid C.
