= Jaime Barroso =

Jaime Barroso may refer to:

- Jaime Barroso (race walker) (born 1968), Spanish race walker
- Jaime Barroso (footballer) (born 2007), Spanish footballer
