= Marco Tiozzo =

Italian footballer (born 2008)

Personal information
- Full name: Marco Tiozzo Pagio
- Date of birth: 7 October 2008 (age 18)
- Place of birth: Porto Viro, Italy
- Position: Midfielder

Team information
- Current team: Juventus U20
- Number: 19

Youth career
- SPAL
- 2021–2022: Padova
- 2022–: Juventus

International career^{‡}
Years	Team	Apps	(Gls)
2024	Italy U16	3	(1)
2024–	Italy U17	6	(0)
2026–	Italy U18	1	(0)
- ‡ National team caps and goals as of 17 February 2026

Marco Tiozzo Pagio (born 7 October 2008) is an Italian footballer who plays as a midfielder for the under-20 (Campionato Primavera 1) team of Serie A club Juventus.

== Club career ==
Born in Porto Viro, Marco Tiozzo is the son of former Serie C player Matteo Tiozzo.

Marco played in the youth ranks of Polesine amateur clubs GSR Taglio di Donada, PGS San Giusto and Lauretum 2020, before going trough the academies of SPAL, Padova and finally in 2022 Juventus.

In November 2024, he signed his first professional contract with Juventus, aged only 16.

During the 2025–26 season, he established himself as a standout with the youth teams in both Campionato Primavera and UEFA Youth League.

== International career ==
Tiozzo is a youth international for Italy, having played for the under-16, under-17 and under-18.
