= João Afonso (footballer, born 2007) =

Portuguese footballer

Personal information
- Full name: João de Oliveira Afonso
- Place of birth: Ponta Delgada, Portugal
- Height: 1.87 m (6 ft 1 1/2 in)
- Position: Goalkeeper

Team information
- Current team: Porto
- Number: 50

Youth career
- 2014–2022: GD São Roque
- 2022–2025: Santa Clara

Senior career*
Years	Team	Apps	(Gls)
2025–2026	Santa Clara	2	(0)
2026–	Porto B	1	(0)
2026–	Porto	0	(0)

International career^{‡}
2024	Portugal U18	1	(0)
2026–	Portugal U20	2	(0)
- * Club domestic league appearances and goals as of 19:45, 14 August 2026 (UTC) ‡ National team caps and goals as of 19:45, 14 August 2026 (UTC)

João de Oliveira Afonso is a Portuguese footballer who plays as a goalkeeper for Primeira Liga club FC Porto.

== Club career ==
Afonso is a youth product of the Portuguese clubs GD São Roque and Santa Clara. IN 2023, he signed his first professional contract with Santa Clara until 2026, and was promoted to their reserves. On 30 September 2024, he extended his contract with Santa Clara until 2027. He was promoted to Santa Clara's first team towards the end of the 2025–26 season for the final two league matchdays, against Nacional and FC Porto. On 16 May 2026 in the Primeira Liga match against Porto, he faced 14 shots saving 6, with the only goal coming from an own-goal from his teammate and was named man of the match. On 25 May 2026, he transferred to Porto on a contract until 2031.

== International career ==
Afonso is a youth international for Portugal. He was called up to the Portugal U20s for the 2026 Maurice Revello Tournament.
