= James Rowswell =

English footballer (born 2010)

Personal information
- Full name: James Patrick Lynch Rowswell
- Date of birth: 13 July 2006 (age 20)
- Place of birth: Welwyn Garden City, England
- Height: 6 ft 2 in (1.88 m)
- Position: Defender

Team information
- Current team: Tottenham Hotspur
- Number: 65

Youth career
- 2011–2025: Tottenham Hotspur

Senior career*
Years	Team	Apps	(Gls)
2025–	Tottenham Hotspur	1	(0)

International career^{‡}
2021	England U16	1	(0)
- * Club domestic league appearances and goals as of 21:40, 15 March 2026 (UTC) ‡ National team caps and goals as of 21:40, 20 December 2021 (UTC)

James Patrick Lynch Rowswell (born 13 July 2006) is an English professional footballer who plays as a defender for Premier League club Tottenham Hotspur.

== Club career ==
Born in Welwyn Garden City, Rosewell was educated in Hertfordshire at Richard Hale School. He joined the Tottenham Hotspur football academy at the age of five years-old, and was a member of the Tottenham squad that won the Under-17 Premier League Cup. He signed his first professional contract in the 2023-24 season.

Having played for Spurs in the UEFA Youth League in the 2025-26 season, Rowswell was included in the senior Tottenham Hotspur first-team match day squads in October and November 2025 for matches in the EFL Cup against Newcastle United, and in the UEFA Champions League against F.C. Copenhagen, but remained an unused substitute. He was also named as a substitute on 8 November 2025 for Spurs match in the Premier League against Manchester United. On 15 March 2026, Rowswell made his club debut for Tottenham Hotspur as a late substitute during a Premier League game against Liverpool at Anfield.

== International career ==
On 20 December 2021, Rowswell started for the England Under-16 side during a victory against Turkey at St George's Park National Football Centre.

== Career statistics ==
As of match played 15 March 2026

Appearances and goals by club, season and competition
Club	Season	League			National cup		League cup		Europe		Other		Total	
Club	Season	Division	Apps	Goals	Apps	Goals	Apps	Goals	Apps	Goals	Apps	Goals	Apps	Goals
Tottenham Hotspur U21	2025–26	—			—		—		—		2 (Note: Appearances in EFL Trophy)	0	2	0
Tottenham Hotspur	2025–26	Premier League	1	0	0	0	0	0	0	0	0	0	1	0
Career total			1	0	0	0	0	0	0	0	2	0	3	0
