= Manex Lozano =

Spanish footballer (born 2007)

Personal information
- Full name: Manex Lozano Carmona
- Date of birth: 23 February 2007 (age 19)
- Place of birth: Pamplona, Spain
- Height: 1.91 m (6 ft 3 in)
- Position: Forward

Team information
- Current team: Basconia

Youth career
- Oberena
- 2023–2025: Athletic Bilbao

Senior career*
| Years | Team | Apps | (Gls) |
| 2025– | Basconia | 14 | (1) |
| 2026 | → Racing Santander (loan) | 4 | (2) |

International career^{‡}
| 2025– | Spain U19 | 1 | (0) |
- * Club domestic league appearances and goals as of 1 February 2026 ‡ National team caps and goals as of 20 December 2025

Manex Lozano Carmona (born 23 February 2007) is a Spanish professional footballer who plays as a forward for CD Basconia.

== Club career ==
Born in Pamplona, Navarre, Lozano joined Athletic Bilbao's Lezama youth academy in 2023, from CD Oberena. He scored 23 goals in 33 matches for the Juvenil side during the 2024–25 season, and renewed his contract until 2029 on 27 June 2025.

During the 2025–26 UEFA Youth League, Lozano scored six times in the first five matches he played, while also featuring with farm team CD Basconia in Segunda Federación. On 10 January 2026, he was loaned to Segunda División side Racing de Santander until June, and made his professional debut hours after the announcement, coming on as a half-time substitute for Maguette Gueye and scoring his side's second in a 3–2 home loss to Real Zaragoza.

In February 2026, Lozano suffered a knee injury which sidelined him for the remainder of the season.

== International career ==
On 12 December 2025, Lozano was called up to the Spain national under-19 team for the SBS Cup in Japan. He made his debut for the side eight days later, starting in a 4–2 win over the hosts.
