= Halid Doltmurziev =

Georgian footballer (born 2008)

Personal information
- Date of birth: 22 May 2007 (age 19)
- Place of birth: Nieuwpoort, Belgium
- Height: 1.79 m (5 ft 10 in)
- Position: Forward

Team information
- Current team: Dinamo
- Number: 7

Youth career
- –2013: FA Nieuwpoort
- 2013–2022: Cercle Brugge
- 2022–2025: Club Brugge
- 2025: Dinamo

Senior career*
Years	Team	Apps	(Gls)
2025	Dinamo–2	4	(0)
2025–	Dinamo	19	(4)

International career^{‡}
2023–2025	Georgia U17	8	(1)
2024–2025	Georgia U19	8	(2)
2026–	Georgia U21	2	(1)
- * Club domestic league appearances and goals as of 18 October 2026 ‡ National team caps and goals as of 18 November 2025

Halid Doltmurziev (Georgian: ჰალიდ დოლტმურზიევი; Russian: Халид Долтмурзиев; born 22 May 2007) is a footballer who plays as a forward for Dinamo. Born in Belgium, he is a Georgia youth international.

== Early life ==
Doltmurziev was born on 22 May 2007 in Nieuwpoort, Belgium and is of Russian descent through his parents. The son of Umalat, he has two brothers. Growing up, he started playing football at the age of three.

== Club career ==
As a youth player, Doltmurziev joined the youth academy of Belgian side FA Nieuwpoort at the age of four. Following his stint there, he joined the youth academy of Cercle Brugge in Belgium in 2013, where he received interest from the youth academy of Belgian outfit Anderlecht.

Nine years later, he joined the youth academy of Club Brugge in Belgium, where he captained the club's under-16 team. Subsequently, he joined the youth academy of Georgian team Dinamo in 2025, where he played in the UEFA Youth League and was promoted to the club's senior team the same year.

== International career ==
Doltmurziev is a Georgia youth international and has represented the country internationally at under-17, under-19 and under-21 levels. Eligible to represent Russia internationally through his parents, he is eligible to represent Belgium internationally, having been born in the country.

During the spring of 2024, he played for the Georgia national under-17 football team for 2024 UEFA European Under-17 Championship qualification. In 2026, he played for the Georgia national under-21 football team for 2027 UEFA European Under-21 Championship qualification.

== Style of play ==
Doltmurziev plays as a forward and is right-footed. Georgian news website Crystalsport wrote in 2023 that he "is very aggressive on the pitch, plays well with both feet... his natural position is center forward, but he sometimes plays as a left winger".
