= Elijah Gift =

Spanish footballer (born 2004)

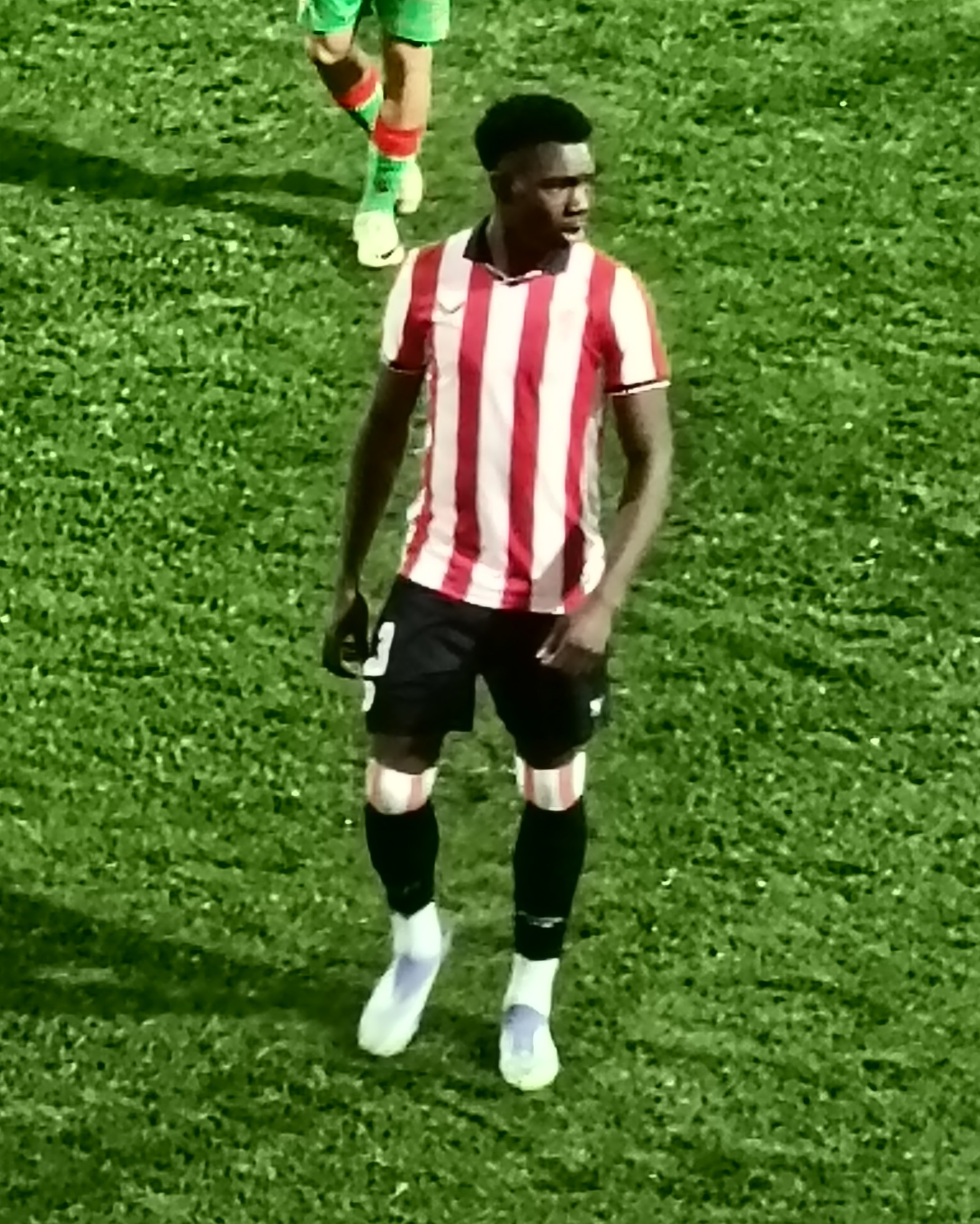
- Gift playing for Bilbao Athletic in 2025

Personal information
- Full name: Elijah Gift Izobodo John
- Date of birth: 11 June 2006 (age 20)
- Place of birth: Corella, Spain
- Height: 1.83 m (6 ft 0 in)
- Position: Winger

Team information
- Current team: Eibar (on loan from Athletic Bilbao)
- Number: 27

Youth career
- –2015: EF Francisco Castejón
- 2015–2017: Huddersfield Town
- 2017–2023: Liverpool
- 2023–2024: Athletic Bilbao

Senior career*
Years	Team	Apps	(Gls)
2024–	Bilbao Athletic	30	(2)
2026–	→ Eibar (loan)	0	(0)

International career^{‡}
2024	Spain U18	3	(0)
2024–	Spain U19	3	(0)
- * Club domestic league appearances and goals as of 9 June 2026 ‡ National team caps and goals as of 03:14, 16 October 2024 (UTC)

Elijah Gift Izobodo John (born 11 June 2006) is a Spanish footballer who plays as a winger for SD Eibar, on loan from Bilbao Athletic.

== Early life ==
Gift was born in Corella, Navarre, Spain to a Nigerian father and a Spanish mother of Cuban descent. His family moved to England around 2015 for work reasons.

== Club career ==
As a child in Spain, Gift joined the Escuela de Fútbol Francisco Castejón. After moving to England in 2015, he joined the youth academy of English side Huddersfield Town and in 2017, was signed Premier League side Liverpool.

He signed for Athletic Bilbao in 2023 for a fee of around €1 million and was expected initially to play for CD Basconia, the club's fifth-tier farm team for teenagers, but was unable to do so due to technicalities concerning its status as a semi-independent organisation and the recent completion of his international transfer, so was instead assigned to the Juvenil A (under-19) squad. He started his senior career with the reserve team Athletic Bilbao B, making his debut during a 3–1 win over UD Mutilvera in the Segunda Federación on 2 March 2024. In the 2025–26 season, he scored twice in 30 appearances.

In June 2026, Gift was called up to do the pre-season with the first team with Edin Terzić. On 31 August, he was loaned to Segunda División side SD Eibar for one year.

== International career ==
Gift has represented Spain internationally at youth levels. He was called up to the provisional squad for the 2023 UEFA European Under-17 Championship but did not make the final cut.

== Style of play ==
Gift mainly operates as a winger. He is known for his strength.

== Personal life ==
Gift has been reported to be a supporter of Liverpool.
