= Mubarak Suleiman =

Nigerian footballer (born 2007)

- Suleiman in 2026

Personal information
- Date of birth: 13 April 2007 (age 19)
- Place of birth: Nigeria
- Height: 1.75 m (5 ft 9 in)
- Positions: Attacking midfielder; central midfielder; forward

Team information
- Current team: Slavia Prague
- Number: 15

Youth career
- Right2win
- 2014–2025: Slavia Prague

Senior career*
Years	Team	Apps	(Gls)
2025	Slavia Prague C	11	(1)
2025–2026	Slavia Prague B	4	(0)
2025–	Slavia Prague	16	(5)
- * Club domestic league appearances and goals as of 1 November 2026

Mubarak Suleiman (born 13 April 2007) is a Nigerian professional footballer who plays as an attacking midfielder for Slavia Prague.

== Career ==
Suleiman was discovered in the Right2win academy in Abuja, from which he joined the Slavia Prague in 2025.

He Quickly stood out with the Slavia youth teams, most notably scoring five goals in three UEFA Youth League games, impressing against the likes of Arsenal and Benfica. Suleiman had also started playing with Slavia's Czech National Football League reserve team, before being added to the first team in early 2026.

Suleiman made his professional debut with Slavia Prague on 8 February 2026, scoring on debut in a 4–0 Czech First League win over Mladá Boleslav.

He kept on featuring and scoring for Jindřich Trpišovský's team as they eventually won the 2025–26 First League, their 9th national Czech league title. In September 2026, Suleiman extended his contract with Slavia Prague until 30 June 2031.

== Career statistics ==
As of match played 31 October 2026

Appearances and goals by club, season and competition
Club	Season	League			Cup		Europe		Other		Total	
Club	Season	Division	Apps	Goals	Apps	Goals	Apps	Goals	Apps	Goals	Apps	Goals
Slavia Prague C	2025–26	Czech National Football League	11	1	—		—		—		11	1
Slavia Prague B	2025–26	Czech National Football League	4	0	—		—		—		4	0
Slavia Prague	2025–26	Czech First League	8	2	1	1	—		—		9	3
Slavia Prague	2026–27	Czech First League	8	3	1	2	2 (Note: Appearances in UEFA Champions League)	0	—		11	5
Slavia Prague	Total		16	5	2	3	2	0	—		20	8
Career total			31	6	2	3	2	0	0	0	35	9
