= Tynan Thompson =

English footballer (born 2008)

Personal information
- Full name: Tynan Torres Thompson
- Date of birth: 17 April 2008 (age 18)
- Place of birth: London, England
- Height: 1.80 m (5 ft 11 in)
- Position: Winger

Team information
- Current team: Manchester United
- Number: 27

Youth career
- Lambeth Tigers
- –2026: Tottenham Hotspur

Senior career*
Years	Team	Apps	(Gls)
2026–	Manchester United	0	(0)

International career^{‡}
2025–	England U18	7	(0)
- * Club domestic league appearances and goals ‡ National team caps and goals as of 12:02, 2 August 2026 (UTC)

Tynan Torres Thompson (born 17 April 2008) is an English professional footballer who plays as a winger for Premier League club Manchester United.

== Club career ==
As a youth player, Thompson joined the youth academy of Lambeth Tigers. Following his stint there, he joined the youth academy of Premier League side Tottenham Hotspur, helping the club's under-17 team win the 2025 U17 Premier League Cup and began training with the senior team in 2025.

On 20 July 2026, Thompson signed for fellow Premier League side Manchester United.

== International career ==
Thompson is an England youth international. On 3 September 2025, he debuted for the England national under-18 football team during a 3–1 friendly away win over the Uzbekistan national under-17 football team.
