= Ceadach O'Neill =

Northern Irish footballer (born 2008)

Personal information
- Date of birth: 10 April 2008 (age 18)
- Place of birth: Kilrea, County Londonderry, Northern Ireland
- Position: Forward

Team information
- Current team: Arsenal
- Number: 53

Youth career
- –2024: Linfield
- 2024–: Arsenal

Senior career*
Years	Team	Apps	(Gls)
2023–2024	Linfield	2	(0)
2026–	Arsenal	0	(0)

International career^{‡}
2022–2023	Northern Ireland U16	4	(1)
2023–2025	Northern Ireland U17	9	(1)
2024–2026	Northern Ireland U19	7	(1)
2025–	Northern Ireland U21	3	(0)
2026–	Northern Ireland	4	(0)
- * Club domestic league appearances and goals as of 22:53, 27 October 2026 (UTC) ‡ National team caps and goals as of 22:53, 27 October 2026 (UTC)

Ceadach O'Neill (born 10 April 2008) is a Northern Irish professional footballer who plays as a forward for Premier League club Arsenal and the Northern Ireland national team.

== Club career ==
From Kilrea, he made his Linfield debut in the Northern Ireland Football League Cup against Queen's University Belfast A.F.C. in October 2023. He made his NIFL Premiership debut for Linfield as a 15 year-old against Ballymena United in November 2023. That month, he joined Arsenal on trial ahead of a proposed move to the side at the end of the season. In August 2024, he made his debut for the Arsenal U18 side, scoring twice in a 3–2 win against West Ham U18. On 14 April 2025, he signed his first professional contract with the club. On 27 October 2026, he made his senior debut for the club and recorded his first assist for the first team, in a penalty shootout defeat to Fleetwood Town in the EFL Cup.

== International career ==
A Northern Irish youth international, O'Neill was named in the senior Northern Ireland squad for their June 2026 friendly matches against Guinea and France. He made his senior debut as a substitute in the 1–0 win over Guinea at the Estadio Municipal de La Línea de la Concepción in Spain on 4 June 2026. Amid reported interest from the Republic of Ireland for him to change his international allegiance, O'Neill won his third and fourth senior caps for Northern Ireland against Georgia and Ukraine in the UEFA Nations League on 25 September and 2 October 2026, respectively.

== Career statistics ==
As of match played on 27 October 2026

Appearances and goals by club, season and competition
Club	Season	League			National cup (Note: Includes Irish Cup, FA Cup)		League cup (Note: Includes NI Football League Cup, EFL Cup)		Europe		Other		Total	
Club	Season	Division	Apps	Goals	Apps	Goals	Apps	Goals	Apps	Goals	Apps	Goals	Apps	Goals
Linfield	2023–24	NIFL Premiership	2	0	1	0	1	0	0	0	—		4	0
Arsenal U21	2025–26	—			—		—		—		1 (Note: Appearance(s) in EFL Trophy)	0	1	0
Arsenal U21	2026–27	—			—		—		—		1	0	1	0
Arsenal U21	Total		—								2	0	2	0
Arsenal	2025–26	Premier League	0	0	0	0	0	0	0	0	—		0	0
Arsenal	2026–27	Premier League	0	0	0	0	1	0	0	0	0	0	1	0
Arsenal	Total		0	0	0	0	1	0	0	0	0	0	1	0
Career Total			2	0	1	0	2	0	0	0	2	0	7	0

=== International ===
As of match played 2 October 2026

Appearances and goals by national team and year
National team	Year	Apps	Goals
Northern Ireland	2026	4	0
Total		4	0
