= Ugo Kadmiri =

Footballer (born 2007)

Personal information
- Birth name: Ugo Lamare-El Kadmiri
- Date of birth: 25 June 2007 (age 19)
- Place of birth: Marseille, France
- Height: 1.94 m (6 ft 4 in)
- Position: Forward

Team information
- Current team: Marseille
- Number: 70

Youth career
- –2017-2019: FC Blancarde Chartreux
- 2017–2018: PSG Academy Morocco
- 2019–2026: Marseille

Senior career*
Years	Team	Apps	(Gls)
2025–2026	Marseille B	2	(0)
2026–	Marseille	3	(0)

International career^{‡}
2025	Sweden U18	2	(0)
- * Club domestic league appearances and goals as of 10 May 2026 (UTC) ‡ National team caps and goals as of 25 March 2025

Ugo Lamare-El Kadmiri (Arabic: أوغو قدميري; born 25 June 2007) is a professional footballer who plays as a forward for Ligue 1 club Marseille. Born in France, he represents Morocco at youth international level.

== Club career ==
As a youth player, El Kadmiri joined the local Marseille youth academy FC Blancarde Chartreux.

Following his stint in France at FC Blancarde Chartreux, he joined the Moroccan branch of the PSG Academy in Rabat in 2017.

=== Marseille ===
Ahead of the 2019–20 season, he joined the youth academy of French side Olympique de Marseille, where he played in the UEFA Youth League

On 19 April 2026, El Kadmiri made his debut for Olympique de Marseille's first team, debuting in the Ligue 1 against FC Lorient in a 2-0 loss.

== International career ==
El Kadmiri is eligible to represent France, Morocco and Sweden on international level.

On 9 November 2024, El Kadmiri was called up to the Morocco national under-18 football team.

On 19 March 2025, he debuted for the Sweden national under-18 football team during a 1–1 away friendly draw with the Scotland national under-18 football team.

== Style of play ==
El Kadmiri plays as a forward. Swedish news website VM-Fotboll.se wrote in 2026 that he "is a tall (193 cm) and goal-scoring striker with a poisonous left foot".

== Career statistics ==
As of match played 10 May 2026

Appearances and goals by club, season and competition
Club	Season	League			Cup		Europe		Other		Total	
Club	Season	Division	Apps	Goals	Apps	Goals	Apps	Goals	Apps	Goals	Apps	Goals
Marseille B	2025–26	National 3	2	0	—		—		—		2	0
Marseille	2025–26	Ligue 1	3	0	—		—		—		3	0
Career total			5	0	0	0	0	0	0	0	5	0
