= Jaime Barroso (footballer) =

Spanish footballer (born 2007)

Personal information
- Full name: Jaime Barroso Porteros
- Date of birth: 23 September 2007 (age 19)
- Place of birth: Madrid, Spain
- Position: Forward

Team information
- Current team: Real Madrid C
- Number: 9

Youth career
- 2014–2020: Periso CF
- 2020–2021: Sporting Hortaleza
- 2021–2022: Rayo Vallecano
- 2022–2025: Real Madrid

Senior career*
Years	Team	Apps	(Gls)
2024–	Real Madrid C	24	(6)

International career^{‡}
2023	Spain U16	2	(1)
2023	Spain U17	2	(1)
2024	Spain U18	1	(0)
- * Club domestic league appearances and goals as of 7 May 2026 ‡ National team caps and goals as of 15 October 2024

Jaime Barroso Porteros (born 23 September 2007) is a Spanish professional footballer who plays as a forward for Real Madrid C.

== Early life ==
Barroso was born on 23 September 2007 in Madrid, Spain. A native of the city, he grew up supporting Spanish La Liga side Real Madrid CF. Growing up, he regarded Brazil international Ronaldo and Portugal international Cristiano Ronaldo as his football idols.

== Club career ==
As a youth player, Barroso joined the youth academy of Periso CF. Following his stint there, he joined the youth academy of Sporting Hortaleza in 2020.

Subsequently, he joined the youth academy of Rayo Vallecano in 2021. During the summer of 2022, he joined the youth academy of La Liga side Real Madrid CF and was promoted to the club's C team in 2022.

== International career ==
Barroso is a Spain youth international. On 10 October 2024, he debuted for the Spain national under-18 football team during a 4–0 away friendly win over the Romania national under-18 football team.

== Style of play ==
Barroso plays as a forward and is left-footed. American news website The Sporting News wrote in 2024 that he "is a physically powerful player with excellent aerial ability, both finishing and pivoting, and is regarded as a great finisher and finisher".
