= Jesús Barrios (footballer, born 2006) =

Spanish footballer (born 2006)

Personal information
- Full name: Jesús Barrios Saborido
- Date of birth: 23 May 2006 (age 20)
- Place of birth: Jerez de la Frontera, Spain
- Position: Winger

Team information
- Current team: Atlético Madrid B
- Number: 23

Youth career
- –2022: Atlético Sanluqueño
- 2022–2025: Atlético Madrid

Senior career*
| Years | Team | Apps | (Gls) |
| 2025–2026 | Atlético Madrid C | 30 | (21) |
| 2026– | Atlético Madrid B | 0 | (0) |
- * Club domestic league appearances and goals as of 01:52, 20 September 2026 (UTC)

Jesús Barrios Saborido (born 23 May 2006) is a Spanish professional footballer who plays as a winger for Atlético Madrileño.

== Early life ==
Barrios was born on 26 March 2006. Born in Jerez de la Frontera, Spain, he is a native of the city.

== Career ==
As a youth player, Barrios joined the youth academy of Atlético Sanluqueño. Following his stint there, he joined the youth academy of La Liga side Atlético Madrid ahead of the 2022–23 season, where he played in the UEFA Youth League and was promoted to the club's reserve team in 2026.

== Style of play ==
Barrios plays as a winger. Spanish newspaper Diario AS wrote in 2025 that he is "a left winger with dribbling skills, talent, and a powerful shot. Right-footed, he often cuts inside to test his shot".
