= Portugal national under-19 football team =

National association football team

Portugal Under-19
- Association: Federação Portuguesa de Futebol (FPF)
- Confederation: UEFA (Europe)
- Head coach: Rui Bento
- FIFA code: POR
First colours	Second colours

Biggest win
- Portugal 9–1 Faroe Islands (Póvoa de Varzim, Portugal; 4 November 2011)

Biggest defeat
- Portugal 0–6 (England) ([[Estádio Amélia Morais, Braga]], Portugal; 31st March 2026)

U-19 European Championship
- Appearances: 12 (first in 2003)
- Best result: Champions (2018)

The Portugal national under-19 football team represents Federação Portuguesa de Futebol, the governing body for Portuguese football, in international football at this age level.

== Competitive record ==
=== UEFA European Under-19 Championship ===
Year	Round
(Norway) 2002	did not qualify
(Liechtenstein) 2003	Runners-up
(Switzerland) 2004	did not qualify
(Northern Ireland) 2005	did not qualify
(Poland) 2006	Group stage
(Austria) 2007	Group stage
(Czech Republic) 2008	did not qualify
(Ukraine) 2009	did not qualify
(France) 2010	Group stage
(Romania) 2011	did not qualify
(Estonia) 2012	Group stage
(Lithuania) 2013	Semi-finals
(Hungary) 2014	Runners-up
(Greece) 2015	did not qualify
(Germany) 2016	Semi-finals
(Georgia (country)) 2017	Runners-up
(Finland) 2018	Champions
(Armenia) 2019	Runners-up
(Northern Ireland) 2020	Cancelled
(Romania) 2021	Cancelled
(Slovakia) 2022	did not qualify
(Malta) 2023	Runners-up
(Northern Ireland) 2024	did not qualify
(Romania) 2025	did not qualify
(Wales) 2026	did not qualify
(Czech Republic) 2027	TBD
(Bulgaria) 2028	TBD
(Netherlands) 2029	TBD

== Players ==
=== Current squad ===
The following players were called up for 2027 UEFA European Under-19 Championship qualification matches against Kazakhstan, Greece, and Serbia on 3, 6, and 9 June 2026; respectively.

No.	Pos.	Player	Date of birth (age)	Club
1	GK	Diogo Ferreira (captain)	10 February 2007 (age 19)	(Portuguese Football Federation) Benfica
12	GK	Matthias da Silva	1 December 2007 (age 18)	(French Football Federation) Lyon
13	DF	Rui Silva	18 March 2007 (age 19)	(Portuguese Football Federation) Benfica
15	DF	Rafael Mota	7 February 2007 (age 19)	(Portuguese Football Federation) Sporting CP
16	DF	Afonso Sousa	17 April 2007 (age 19)	(Portuguese Football Federation) Braga
3	DF	José Neto	19 April 2008 (age 18)	(Portuguese Football Federation) Benfica
2	DF	Daniel Costa	15 September 2007 (age 19)	(Portuguese Football Federation) Sporting CP
14	DF	Duarte Soares	19 February 2007 (age 19)	(Portuguese Football Federation) Benfica
6	MF	Eduardo Felicíssimo	8 January 2007 (age 19)	(Portuguese Football Federation) Sporting CP
5	MF	Rafael Quintas	8 March 2008 (age 18)	(Portuguese Football Federation) Benfica
4	MF	Bernardo Lima	26 March 2008 (age 18)	(Portuguese Football Federation) Porto
8	MF	Miguel Figueiredo	2 August 2008 (age 18)	(Portuguese Football Federation) Benfica
10	MF	Flávio Gonçalves	30 May 2007 (age 19)	(Portuguese Football Federation) Sporting CP
19	MF	João Trovisco	23 October 2007 (age 19)	(Portuguese Football Federation) Braga
20	MF	Mateus Mide	10 May 2008 (age 18)	(Portuguese Football Federation) Porto
7	FW	Sandro Vidigal	28 July 2007 (age 19)	(Portuguese Football Federation) Braga
17	FW	Rodrigo Rodrigues	6 December 2007 (age 18)	(Portuguese Football Federation) Gil Vicente
11	FW	Anísio Cabral	15 February 2008 (age 18)	(Portuguese Football Federation) Benfica
18	FW	Afonso Patrão	3 February 2007 (age 19)	(Royal Belgian Football Association) Westerlo
9	FW	Gabriel Silva	9 April 2007 (age 19)	(Portuguese Football Federation) Sporting CP

== See also ==
- Portugal national football team
- Portugal national under-21 football team
- Portugal national under-17 football team
