= Santiago Verdi =

Portuguese footballer (born 2008)

Personal information
- Full name: Santiago Verdi Oliveira Silva
- Date of birth: 5 May 2008 (age 18)
- Place of birth: Fafe, Portugal
- Height: 1.82 m (6 ft 0 in)
- Position: Midfielder

Team information
- Current team: Vitória de Guimarães
- Number: 56

Youth career
- 2016–2026: Vitória de Guimarães

Senior career*
Years	Team	Apps	(Gls)
2024–2026	Vitória de Guimarães B	19	(2)
2026–	Vitória de Guimarães	1	(0)

International career^{‡}
2024	Portugal U16	7	(0)
2024–2025	Portugal U17	23	(0)
2025–2026	Portugal U18	11	(0)
2026–	Portugal U19	3	(0)
- * Club domestic league appearances and goals as of 11:37, 24 September 2026 (UTC) ‡ National team caps and goals as of 11:37, 24 September 2026 (UTC)

Santiago Verdi Oliveira Silva (born 5 May 2008), known as Santiago Verdi, is a Portuguese professional footballer who plays as a midfielder for Vitória de Guimarães.

== Club career ==
Born in Fafe in the Braga District, Verdi joined Vitória de Guimarães at age 6. In August 2024, aged 16, he signed his first professional contract, of three years. He played twice for the reserve team in the fourth-tier Campeonato de Portugal in 2024–25, and scored twice in 17 games the following season in Liga 3.

In July 2026, with one year remaining on his contract with Vitória, Verdi signed a new deal to last until 2031. He made his first-team debut in the second game of the Primeira Liga season, a 3–2 loss away to Sporting CP, as a substitute for the last 14 minutes in place of Gonçalo Nogueira.

== International career ==
In August 2024, Verdi and Vitória clubmate Zeega were called up for the Portugal under-17 team by manager Bino, for a tournament in Trieste, Italy, the following month. He was chosen for the 2025 UEFA European Under-17 Championship in Albania, and came on as a substitute as his team beat France 3–0 in the final.

At the 2025 FIFA U-17 World Cup in Qatar, again from the bench, Verdi scored in the penalty shootout win over Brazil in the semi-finals. He also came on as a substitute in the final, a 1–0 win against Austria.

== Personal life ==
Verdi received his second name from his great-grandfather, an admirer of the Italian composer Giuseppe Verdi.
