= Mexico national under-17 football team =

Mexico U-17
- Nickname(s): El Tri (The Tri); El Tricolor (The Tricolor); Los Niños Héroes (The Hero Boys)
- Association: Mexican Football Federation (Federación Mexicana de Fútbol)
- Confederation: CONCACAF (North America)
- Head coach: Jürgen Castañeda
- FIFA code: MEX
First colours	Second colours

First international
- Hungary 0–0 Mexico (Shanghai, China; 31 July 1985)

Biggest win
- Mexico 9–0 Curaçao (Guatemala City, Guatemala; 11 February 2023)

Biggest defeat
- Soviet Union 7–0 Mexico (St.John's, Canada; 14 July 1987)

CONCACAF Under-17 Championship
- Appearances: 12 (first in 1983)
- Best result: Champions (1985, 1987, 1991, 1996, 2013, 2015, 2017, 2019, 2023)

FIFA U-17 World Cup
- Appearances: 16 (first in 1985)
- Best result: Champions (2005, 2011)

The Mexico national under-17 football team is one of the youth teams that represents Mexico in football at the under-17 level, and is controlled by the Mexican Football Federation (Spanish: Federación Mexicana de Fútbol). The team has reached the final of the FIFA U-17 World Cup four times, and is a two-time winner, being crowned champions in 2005 and 2011.

== History ==
=== 2005 ===
Mexico was placed in Group C along with Australia, Turkey and Uruguay in which Mexico came in second behind Turkey. In the knockout stage, an extra-time victory over zone rivals Costa Rica led to a then convincing victory over the Netherlands. Mexico ended up defeating Brazil 3–0 in the final.

=== 2011 ===
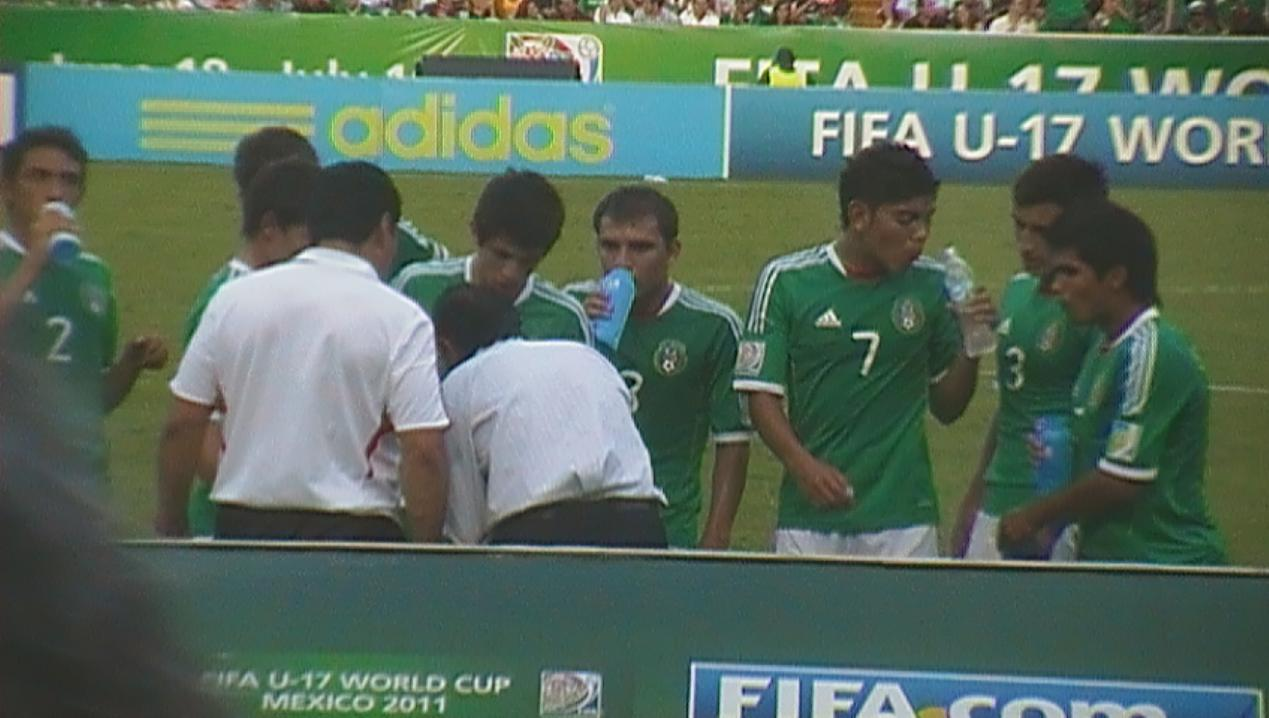
Mexico U-17 players of the 2011 generation

The 2011 FIFA U-17 World Cup was held in home soil. Mexico was placed in Group A together with North Korea, Congo and the Netherlands. Mexico eventually finished first of their group after winning their three matches and advanced to the Round of 16 and the Quarter-Finals, where they won their matches against Panama and France respectively. In the semifinals, Mexico had to face Germany, the only other team in the competition who had not lost any of their matches. Germany had advantage during the first minutes of the second time, but Mexico came back to equalize the score after Jonathan Espericueta scored a second goal from a corner kick, where Julio Gómez was injured and left the field. However, Gómez came back in the dying minutes to score an overhead kick, the decisive goal in the final minute, the final score was 3-2 which translated into the first significant victory over Germany in history. Mexico faced Uruguay in the final, defeating them 2–0 in a very closed match where the balance could have tilted any way. Briseño scored the first goal in the first half when Uruguay was the dominating side. During the second half Uruguay kept pressing on and started to dominate again looking for the equalizer however, during the last advances their defense became disorganized and in a counterattack Giovani Casillas scored the finishing goal. With this result Mexico became champions without losing a single game in the tournament and also became the first host nation to win the U-17 World Cup.

=== 2013 ===
As defending champions, Mexico was defeated 6-1 by Nigeria in their first match of the group stage. Despite being defeated by a large number of goals, Mexico could still advance to the next round by defeating rivals Iraq and Sweden in the group stage. In their way to the final match, Mexico won their matches against favorites Italy, Brazil and Argentina. In the final round, Mexico faced Nigeria for a second time, but the team lost once again and was left in second place of the tournament.

=== 2015 ===
Mexico was lucky enough to make it to the 2015 FIFA U-17 World Cup which was held in Chile. They were placed in Group C along with Germany, Australia, Argentina and won two of their three matches of the group stage. Finishing number 1 on group stages they advanced to Round of 16. In order to make it to quarter finals, they had to defeat Chile and they dominated them by beating them 4–1. Mexico got the chance to go to semi-finals with a familiar rival from 2013, they went against Nigeria, unfortunately Nigeria defeated them in an intense game and they didn't make it to the Finals. Mexico had the chance on finishing strong with a Third Place title against Belgium in which they lost. The 17-year-old, Diego Cortés from the Mexico national football team finished the 2015 FIFA U-17 World Cup being known as making the best goal of the FIFA U-17 World Cup.

== Results and fixtures ==
The following matches have been played within the past 12 months.

Legend

Win Draw Loss Fixture

=== 2025 ===
October 27, 2025 Friendly	Zambia	3–1	Mexico	Dubai, United Arab Emirates
		Report

October 30, 2025 Friendly	Mexico	1–0	Tajikistan	Dubai, United Arab Emirates
	García 61'	Report

November 4, 2025 2025 FIFA U-17 World Cup	Mexico	1–2	South Korea	Aspire Zone (pitch 1), Al Rayyan
16:00	De Nigris 44'	Report	Koo Hyeon-bin 19'; Ian Nam 49'	Referee: Abdou Mefire (Cameroon)

7 November 2025 2025 FIFA U-17 World Cup	Mexico	1–0	Ivory Coast	Aspire Zone (pitch 2), Al Rayyan
17:45	Olvera 74'	Report		Referee: Faisal Al-Balawi (Saudi Arabia)

10 November 2025 2025 FIFA U-17 World Cup	Switzerland	3–1	Mexico	Aspire Zone (pitch 3), Al Rayyan
17:45	Mijajlovic 17', 58'; López 20' (o.g.)	Report	De Nigris 57'	Referee: Hamza El Fariq (Morocco)

14 November 2025 2025 FIFA U-17 World Cup	Argentina	2–2 (4–5 p)	Mexico	Aspire Zone (pitch 2), Al Rayyan
17:45	Tulián 9'; Closter 87'	Report	Gamboa 46', 58'	Referee: Andrea Colombo (Italy)
	Penalties
	Bouhier (penalty missed); Gómez Mattar (penalty scored); Closter (penalty scored); Satas (penalty scored); Jainikoski (penalty scored)		(penalty scored) Pineda; (penalty scored) Mancilla; (penalty scored) Hernández; (penalty scored) J. López; (penalty scored) S. López

18 November 2025 2025 FIFA U-17 World Cup	Mexico	0–5	Portugal	Aspire Zone (pitch 3), Al Rayyan
15:00		Report	Quintas 15' (pen.); Anísio 48'; Zeega 81'; Figueiredo 83'; Pereira 85'	Referee: Fernando Véjar (Chile)

=== 2026 ===
5 February 2026 2026 CONCACAF U-17 World Cup qualification	Sint Maarten	0–10	Mexico	Hasely Crawford Stadium, Port of Spain
16:00		Report	A. Sánchez 3', 7', 13'; Calvillo 58'; Cisneros 67' (pen.), 70' (pen.), 83'; Trujillo 85', 89'; González 90'	Referee: Adrián Lage (Cuba)

7 February 2026 2026 CONCACAF U-17 World Cup qualification	Mexico	4–0	Saint Martin	Hasely Crawford Stadium, Port of Spain
19:00	Valdez 7'; Trujillo 40'; Calvillo 65'; E. Sánchez 90'	Report		Referee: Michael Akangou (Cayman Islands)

9 February 2026 2026 CONCACAF U-17 World Cup qualification	Barbados	1–4	Mexico	Hasely Crawford Stadium, Port of Spain
16:00	Redman-Bellamy 47'	Report	Vargas 3'; Mota 6'; A. Sánchez 7'; Trujillo 67'	Referee: Kareem Benjamin (Saint Kitts and Nevis)

9 February 2026 2026 CONCACAF U-17 World Cup qualification	Mexico	2–1	Trinidad and Tobago	Hasely Crawford Stadium, Port of Spain
16:00	Orduño 82'; A. Sánchez 86'	Report	Richardson 90+5' (pen.)	Referee: Michael Akangou (Cayman Islands)

15 May 2026 Friendly	Newell's Old Boys Academy (Argentina)	1–3	Mexico	Rosario
		Report	Kimbrough x2; Tejeda

17 May 2026 Friendly Tournament	Grêmio Youth Academy (Brazil)	0–1	Mexico	Rosario
		Report	Kimbrough

18 May 2026 Friendly Tournament	Gimnasia (LP) Academy (Argentina)	1–1	Mexico	Rosario
		Report	A. Sánchez

19 May 2026 Friendly Tournament	Mexico	2–0	(Ecuador) Barcelona S.C. Academy	Rosario
	Kimbrough; Martínez	Report

21 May 2026 Friendly Tournament	Peñarol Academy (Uruguay)	0–1	Mexico	Rosario
		Report	Mota

22 May 2026 Friendly Tournament Final	Venezuela	2–1	Mexico	Rosario
		Report	Kimbrough

28 August 2026 Friendly	Mexico	4–1	Colombia	Centro de Alto Rendimiento, Toluca
	A. Sánchez x2; Hernández Cisneros	Report

30 August 2026 Friendly	Mexico	0–1	Colombia	Centro de Alto Rendimiento, Toluca
		Report

1 October 2026 2026 Vertex Cup London	Argentina	v	Mexico	Skyex Community Stadium, Hayes

4 October 2026 2026 Vertex Cup London	Mexico	v	China	Oliver Connell & Son Community Stadium, Perivale

7 October 2026 2026 Vertex Cup London	Mexico	v	Tanzania	Skyex Community Stadium, Hayes

== Players ==
=== Current squad ===
The following players were called up for the 2026 FIFA U-17 World Cup.

No.	Pos.	Player	Date of birth (age)	Caps	Goals	Club
	GK	Marcelo Ávalos	8 November 2009 (age 17)	3	0	(United States Soccer Federation) San Jose Earthquakes
	GK	Johan Cuenca	3 July 2009 (age 17)	2	0	(Mexican Football Federation) UANL
	GK	José Corona	8 May 2010 (age 16)	1	0	(Mexican Football Federation) Tijuana
	DF	André Godinez	20 January 2009 (age 17)	4	0	(Mexican Football Federation) Guadalajara
	DF	Gerson Gutiérrez	8 May 2009 (age 17)	4	0	(Mexican Football Federation) Guadalajara
	DF	Adonai Valdez	14 February 2009 (age 17)	3	1	(Mexican Football Federation) América
	DF	Alan Hernández	5 August 2009 (age 17)	3	0	(Mexican Football Federation) León
	DF	Dylan Martínez	18 March 2009 (age 17)	3	0	(Mexican Football Federation) Necaxa
	DF	Miguel Rivera	2 September 2009 (age 17)	0	0	(Mexican Football Federation) América
	DF	Álvaro Velázquez	20 March 2009 (age 17)	0	0	(Mexican Football Federation) Monterrey
	MF	Jonathan de la Fuente	13 June 2009 (age 17)	4	0	(United States Soccer Federation) Colorado Rapids
	MF	Ángel Reyes	5 March 2009 (age 17)	4	0	(Mexican Football Federation) Atlético San Luis
	MF	Edy Lugo	2 July 2009 (age 17)	3	0	(Mexican Football Federation) Monterrey
	MF	David Orduño	19 January 2009 (age 17)	2	1	(Mexican Football Federation) Tijuana
	MF	Matthew Arana	28 August 2010 (age 16)	0	0	(United States Soccer Federation) Houston Dynamo
	MF	Santiago Cisneros	11 August 2009 (age 17)	0	0	(Mexican Football Federation) León
	MF	Juan Carlos Martínez	12 March 2010 (age 16)	0	0	(Mexican Football Federation) Querétaro
	MF	Saulo Tejeda	1 May 2009 (age 17)	0	0	(Croatian Football Federation) Dinamo Zagreb Academy
	FW	Adán Sánchez	25 May 2009 (age 17)	3	5	(Mexican Football Federation) Monterrey
	FW	Da'vian Kimbrough	18 February 2010 (age 16)	0	0	(United States Soccer Federation) North Texas SC
	FW	Fernando Ruiz	14 April 2010 (age 16)	0	0	(Mexican Football Federation) Toluca

=== Recent call-ups ===
The following players have also been called up within the last twelve months.

Pos.	Player	Date of birth (age)	Caps	Goals	Club	Latest call-up
GK	Axel Gutiérrez	14 May 2009 (age 17)	0	0	(Mexico) Guadalajara	Tornero Canteras de America
GK	Santiago López	18 January 2008 (age 18)	2	0	(Mexico) Toluca	2025 FIFA U-17 World Cup
GK	Abdon Turrubiates	17 November 2008 (age 18)	2	0	(Mexico) León	2025 FIFA U-17 World Cup
GK	Matías Velázquez	6 October 2008 (age 18)	2	0	(Mexico) Santos Laguna	2025 FIFA U-17 World Cup
DF	Gabriel Martínez	5 March 2009 (age 17)	0	0	(Mexico) Atlas	2026 Vertex Cup
DF	Dylan Avelar	20 January 2009 (age 17)	0	0	(Mexico) Guadalajara	v. Colombia, 30 August 2026
DF	Marcelo Rivera	10 October 2009 (age 17)	0	0	(Mexico) León	v. Colombia, 30 August 2026
DF	Alberto Sánchez	11 March 2009 (age 17)	0	0	(Mexico) Santos Laguna	v. Colombia, 30 August 2026
DF	Kenneth Hoban	29 April 2009 (age 17)	0	0	(United States) El Paso Locomotive	Tornero Canteras de America
DF	Sebastian Mattei	10 August 2010 (age 16)	0	0	(Italy) Roma Academy	Tornero Canteras de America
DF	Ricardo Schelble	24 February 2009 (age 17)	0	0	(Germany) SC Freiburg Academy	Tornero Canteras de America
DF	Gael Solorio	30 January 2009 (age 17)	3	0	(Mexico) Atlas	2026 CONCACAF U-17 World Cup qualification
DF	Eliud Sánchez	9 January 2009 (age 17)	2	1	(Mexico) Pachuca	2026 CONCACAF U-17 World Cup qualification
DF	Adrián Villa	5 March 2008 (age 18)	12	0	(Mexico) Pachuca	2025 FIFA U-17 World Cup
DF	Ian Olvera	15 June 2008 (age 18)	11	1	(Mexico) Tijuana	2025 FIFA U-17 World Cup
DF	Michael Corona	4 January 2008 (age 18)	10	0	(Mexico) León	2025 FIFA U-17 World Cup
DF	Félix Contreras	13 February 2008 (age 18)	6	0	(United States) Loyola Marymount University	2025 FIFA U-17 World Cup
DF	José Navarro	7 August 2008 (age 18)	5	0	(Mexico) Pachuca	2025 FIFA U-17 World Cup
MF	Ricardo González	14 April 2009 (age 17)	3	1	(Mexico) América	2026 Vertex Cup
MF	Luis Trujillo	22 June 2009 (age 17)	4	4	(Mexico) América	v. Colombia, 30 August 2026
MF	Noé Mota	21 April 2009 (age 17)	4	1	(Mexico) Atlas	v. Colombia, 30 August 2026
MF	Joseph González	29 April 2009 (age 17)	0	0	(Mexico) Guadalajara	v. Colombia, 30 August 2026
MF	Jorge Lewis	5 March 2009 (age 17)	0	0	(Mexico) Guadalajara	v. Colombia, 30 August 2026
MF	George Porter	(17)	0	0	(United States) Minnesota United	v. Colombia, 30 August 2026
MF	Jorge Chávez	13 October 2009 (age 17)	0	0	(Mexico) UANL	Tornero Canteras de America
MF	Gael García	4 June 2008 (age 18)	15	2	(Mexico) Guadalajara	2025 FIFA U-17 World Cup
MF	Jhonnatan Grajales	30 October 2008 (age 18)	9	1	(Mexico) Guadalajara	2025 FIFA U-17 World Cup
MF	Kenneth Martínez	23 January 2008 (age 18)	9	0	(Mexico) Juárez	2025 FIFA U-17 World Cup
MF	Jorge Sánchez	11 February 2008 (age 18)	8	1	(Mexico) Monterrey	2025 FIFA U-17 World Cup
MF	Karín Hernández	30 October 2008 (age 18)	8	0	(Mexico) León	2025 FIFA U-17 World Cup
MF	Íñigo Borgio	4 January 2008 (age 18)	7	0	(Spain) Leganés	2025 FIFA U-17 World Cup
MF	Óscar Pineda	29 July 2008 (age 18)	7	0	(United States) Chicago Fire	2025 FIFA U-17 World Cup
FW	Uziel Vargas	23 January 2009 (age 17)	2	1	(Mexico) Guadalajara	2026 Vertex Cup
FW	Gustavo Cervantes	21 May 2009 (age 17)	0	0	(Mexico) Toluca	v. Colombia, 30 August 2026
FW	Orlando Gutiérrez	20 February 2009 (age 17)	0	0	(Mexico) Atlas	Tornero Canteras de America
FW	Jesús Hernández	12 January 2009 (age 17)	0	0	(Mexico) Juárez	Tornero Canteras de America
FW	Carlos Calvillo	1 July 2009 (age 17)	3	2	(Mexico) Santos Laguna	2026 CONCACAF U-17 World Cup qualification
FW	Aldo de Nigris	12 April 2008 (age 18)	12	6	(Mexico) Monterrey	2025 FIFA U-17 World Cup
FW	Luis Gamboa	25 October 2008 (age 18)	12	4	(Mexico) Atlas	2025 FIFA U-17 World Cup
FW	Máximo Reyes	25 July 2008 (age 18)	9	4	(Mexico) Santos Laguna	2025 FIFA U-17 World Cup
FW	José Mancilla	3 June 2008 (age 18)	8	2	(Mexico) Pumas UNAM	2025 FIFA U-17 World Cup
FW	Juan López	16 December 2008 (age 17)	3	0	(Mexico) Juárez	2025 FIFA U-17 World Cup
FW	Lucca Vuoso	7 November 2008 (age 18)	3	0	(Mexico) Santos Laguna	2025 FIFA U-17 World Cup

== Competitive record ==
=== FIFA U-17 World Cup ===
Year	Round	Pld	W	D	L	GF	GA
(China) 1985	Group stage	3	1	1	1	3	3
(Canada) 1987	Group stage	3	1	1	1	3	9
(Scotland) 1989	Did not enter						
(Italy) 1991	Group stage	3	1	0	2	5	6
(Japan) 1993	Group stage	3	1	0	2	4	7
(Ecuador) 1995	Did not qualify						
(Egypt) 1997	Group stage	3	1	0	2	8	6
(New Zealand) 1999	Quarter-finals	4	2	0	2	7	7
(Trinidad and Tobago) 2001	Did not qualify						
(Finland) 2003	Quarter-finals	4	1	2	1	5	5
(Peru) 2005	Champions	6	5	0	1	16	3
(South Korea) 2007	Did not qualify						
(Nigeria) 2009	Round of 16	4	2	1	1	4	3
(Mexico) 2011	Champions	7	7	0	0	17	7
(United Arab Emirates) 2013	Runners-up	7	4	1	2	11	11
(Chile) 2015	Fourth place	7	4	1	2	14	9
(India) 2017	Round of 16	4	0	2	2	4	6
(Brazil) 2019	Runners-up	7	3	2	2	14	5
(Indonesia) 2023	Round of 16	4	1	1	2	7	10
(Qatar) 2025	Round of 16	5	1	1	3	5	12
(Qatar) 2026	In progress	1	1	0	0	1	0
(Qatar) 2027	To be determined						
(Qatar) 2028	To be determined						
(Qatar) 2029	To be determined						
Total:17/21	2 Titles	75	36	13	26	128	109

=== CONCACAF Under-17 World Cup Qualification ===
Year	Round	Pld	W	D*	L	GF	GA
(Trinidad and Tobago) 1983	Third Place	4	3	1	0	13	0
(Mexico) 1985	Champions	7	6	1	0	37	1
(Honduras) 1987	Champions	6	6	0	0	16	2
(Cuba) 1988	Did not enter						
(Trinidad and Tobago) 1991	Champions	6	3	3	0	8	2
(Cuba) 1992	Runners-up	6	4	2	0	21	6
(El Salvador) 1994	Fourth Place	6	4	0	2	17	4
(Trinidad and Tobago) 1996	Champions	6	6	0	0	23	2
(Mexico) 2009	Cancelled due to the 2009 flu pandemic outbreak						
(Jamaica) 2011	did not participate/World Cup Host						
(Panama) 2013	Champions	5	5	0	0	14	3
(Honduras) 2015	Champions	6	4	2	0	16	3
(Panama) 2017	Champions	6	4	1	1	22	7
(United States) 2019	Champions	7	7	0	0	21	3
(Guatemala) 2023	Champions	7	6	1	0	29	2
Total	9 Titles	72	58	11	3	237	35

*Draws include knockout matches decided on penalty kicks

== Head-to-head record ==
The following table shows Mexico's head-to-head record in the FIFA U-17 World Cup.

Opponent	Pld	W	D	L	GF	GA	GD	Win %
Argentina	4	2	1	1	7	4	+3	50.00
Australia	3	1	1	1	6	4	+2	33.33
Belgium	1	0	0	1	2	3	−1	0.00
Bolivia	1	0	1	0	2	2	+0	0.00
Brazil	5	2	1	2	6	5	+1	40.00
China	1	0	1	0	3	3	+0	0.00
Chile	2	1	1	0	4	1	+3	50.00
Colombia	1	0	1	0	0	0	+0	0.00
Congo	2	1	0	1	3	3	+0	50.00
Costa Rica	1	1	0	0	3	1	+2	100.00
Ecuador	1	1	0	0	2	0	+2	100.00
England	1	0	0	1	2	3	−1	0.00
Finland	1	1	0	0	2	0	+2	100.00
France	1	1	0	0	2	1	+1	100.00
Germany	3	2	0	1	6	6	+0	66.67
Ghana	2	0	0	2	1	8	−7	0.00
Hungary	1	0	1	0	0	0	+0	0.00
Iran	1	0	0	1	1	2	−1	0.00
Iraq	2	1	1	0	4	2	+2	50.00
Italy	3	2	0	1	5	3	+2	66.67
Ivory Coast	1	1	0	0	1	0	+1	100.00
Japan	3	2	0	1	5	2	+3	66.67
Mali	2	0	0	2	1	8	−7	0.00
Netherlands	3	2	1	0	8	3	+5	66.67
New Zealand	2	2	0	0	9	0	+9	100.00
Nigeria	4	1	0	3	4	13	−9	25.00
North Korea	1	1	0	0	3	1	+2	100.00
Panama	1	1	0	0	2	0	+2	100.00
Paraguay	1	0	1	0	0	0	+0	0.00
Portugal	1	0	0	1	0	5	−5	0.00
Qatar	2	2	0	0	4	1	+3	100.00
Solomon Islands	1	1	0	0	8	0	+8	100.00
South Korea	3	1	1	1	3	3	+0	33.33
Soviet Union	1	0	0	1	0	7	−7	0.00
Spain	2	1	0	1	3	3	+0	50.00
Sweden	1	1	0	0	1	0	+1	100.00
Switzerland	2	0	0	2	1	5	−4	0.00
Thailand	1	1	0	0	4	0	+4	100.00
Turkey	1	0	0	1	1	2	−1	0.00
United States	1	0	0	1	2	3	−1	0.00
Uruguay	2	2	0	0	4	0	+4	100.00
Venezuela	1	0	1	0	2	2	+0	0.00
Total	74	35	13	26	127	109	+18	47.30

== Honours ==
- FIFA U-17 World Cup
  - Winners (2): 2005, 2011
  - Runners-up (2): 2013, 2019
- CONCACAF Under-17 Championship
  - Winners (9): 1985, 1987, 1991, 1996, 2013, 2015, 2017, 2019, 2023
  - Runners-up (1): 1992
  - Third Place (1): 1983

== See also ==
- Mexico national football team
- Mexico national under-23 football team
- Mexico national under-20 football team
- Mexico women's national football team
- Mexico national beach football team
- Mexico national futsal team
