= 2025 FIFA U-17 World Cup =

International football competition

كأس العالم تحت 17 سنة قطر 2025

Tournament details
- Host country: Qatar
- Dates: 3–27 November
- Teams: 48 (from 6 confederations)
- Venue: 1 (in 1 host city)

Final positions
- Champions: Portugal (1st title)
- Runners-up: Austria
- Third place: Italy
- Fourth place: Brazil

Tournament statistics
- Matches played: 104
- Goals scored: 326 (3.13 per match)
- Attendance: 100,073 (962 per match)
- Top scorer(s): (Austria) Johannes Moser (8 goals)
- Best player: (Portugal) Mateus Mide
- Best goalkeeper: (Portugal) Romário Cunha
- Fair play award: Czech Republic

The 2025 FIFA U-17 World Cup was the 20th edition of the FIFA U-17 World Cup, contested by the under-17 national teams of the member associations of FIFA. It took place in Qatar from 3–27 November. This edition marked the last of the biannual scheduling and the first the new annual cycle adopted by FIFA for the U-17 World Cup and expanded to be the first to be played in a 48-team format. As part of these changes, FIFA also granted Qatar the hosting rights for the tournament for a five-year period from 2025 to 2029.

Germany were the defending champions, having won their first title in 2023. They were eliminated in the round of 32 by Burkina Faso, the earliest exit for a team holding the U-17 World Cup title who qualified for the subsequent tournament.

Portugal won their first title after defeating Austria 1–0 in the final.

== Format changes ==
Starting with this edition, the FIFA U-17 World Cup featured a number of changes to its format adopted during 2023. These changes stemmed from a proposal submitted by the Liberia Football Association at the 71st FIFA Congress held virtually on 21 May 2021, regarding FIFA's youth tournaments. FIFA initiated a consultative process among its member associations before publishing a report by the FIFA Chief of Global Football Development Arsène Wenger, which included an annual 48-team U-17 World Cup. Over the following months these proposals continued to be evaluated and analysed until they were approved by the FIFA Council in October 2023, and then confirmed on 14 March 2024.

The original new competition format would have had 48 participating teams divided into four 12-team mini-tournaments consisting of three groups of four teams in single round-robin format. Within each mini-tournament, the three group winners plus the best second-placed team would advance to the semi-finals (essentially tournament's round of 16) and final (essentially tournament's quarter-finals). The four mini-tournaments winners would qualify for the final four consisting of semi-finals, third place play-off and the grand final, which would determine the champions of the tournament.

In March 2025, FIFA announced that the format would be changed to mirror that of the FIFA World Cup from 2026 onwards. The teams were divided into 12 groups of four teams each, with each group playing in a single round-robin format, thus each team played three matches. The top two teams from each group (24 teams) and the eight best third-placed teams advanced to the knockout stage, starting at the round of 32 all the way to the final. In total, the tournament included 104 matches, double the amount of past editions.

== Host selection ==
On 15 November 2023, FIFA launched a global call for expressions of interest from member associations to host the next five editions of the U17 World Cup (2025–2029) as a single consolidated package. Member associations had to express their interest no later than 4 December 2023.

After a FIFA Council meeting held on 14 March 2024, it was announced that Qatar would host the next five editions of the U-17 World Cup (2025–2029), as part of the new annual cycle implemented by FIFA for the tournament. This was the first time that Qatar hosted the FIFA U-17 World Cup and the third time that the tournament was held in the Arab world.

=== Controversies ===
Although FIFA did not disclose whether there were other interested member associations, a joint bid by Indonesia and Singapore and another by Denmark were known to have been submitted.

The Danish Football Association accused FIFA of changing the format to a five-year package without clearly announcing it. They said that they and other potential bidders were blindsided by FIFA when Qatar and Morocco—who was chosen to host the FIFA U-17 Women's World Cup during the same years—ended up with the deal, saying that "FIFA moved the goalposts".

This joined previous controversies regarding Qatar hosting the 2022 FIFA World Cup, such as violations of the human rights of migrant workers and FIFA's ban on the Danish football team training with pro-human rights shirts. In 2024, Amnesty International criticized FIFA and Qatar for not yet addressing the "severe" human rights violations surrounding the hosting of the 2022 World Cup, claiming that they are not taking responsibility for "the vast number of migrant workers who were exploited and in many cases died to make the 2022 World Cup possible". In 2025, Amnesty reported that "the Qatari authorities continued to fail to investigate effectively the deaths of migrant workers and to hold employers or authorities accountable, preventing any assessment of whether the deaths were work-related and depriving families of the opportunity to receive compensation." Also in 2025, Human Rights Watch stated that despite scrutiny regarding migrant worker deaths building up to the tournament, Qatar "has failed to prevent, investigate, or compensate" for the deaths of thousands of them.

== Venues ==
The host venues were announced by FIFA on 22 May 2025.

All matches were held in the city of Al Rayyan inside the "Aspire Zone" sport complex. The final took place at the Khalifa International Stadium, which was also in the Aspire Zone. The eight pitches used were named after eight former Qatar national football team players; Mohammed Ghanim (pitch 1), Ibrahim Khalfan (pitch 2), Badr Bilal (pitch 3), Khalid Salman (pitch 4), Khaled Ballan (pitch 5), Mansour Muftah (pitch 7), Mahmoud Soufi (pitch 8), and Adel Ahmed Malalla (pitch 9). Only Soufi and Ballan had died before the tournament started.

Location of the host city of the FIFA U-17 World Cup Qatar 2025.

- 1 Al Rayyan

2025 FIFA U-17 World Cup venues
Al Rayyan
Aspire Zone
Khalifa International Stadium	8 pitches
Capacity: 45,857	8 pitches

== Teams ==
=== Qualification ===
Teams qualified Teams failed to qualify Teams withdrew or suspended Did not enter Not a FIFA member

A total of 48 teams qualified for the final tournament. In addition to Qatar, who qualified automatically as the host nation, the other 47 teams qualified from six separate continental competitions. The new expanded slot allocation per confederation was approved by the FIFA Council meeting held on 15 May 2024:

- AFC (Asia): 9 (including the hosts Qatar)
- CAF (Africa): 10
- CONCACAF (North America, Central America and the Caribbean): 8
- CONMEBOL (South America): 7
- OFC (Oceania): 3
- UEFA (Europe): 11

El Salvador, Fiji, Republic of Ireland, Uganda and Zambia made their debut in the tournament. Uganda made their first appearance in a FIFA tournament.

Bolivia qualified for its first U-17 World Cup since 1987 and to any FIFA tournament for the first time since the 1994 FIFA World Cup. After hosting the 2023 edition, Indonesia qualified by merit to a FIFA U-17 World Cup. (Note: In the 1938 FIFA World Cup, the then-Dutch East Indies won by walkover against both Japan and the United States who withdrew; in 1979 Indonesia U-20 team played at the FIFA World Youth Championship as the second Asian team, replacing three 1978 AFC Youth Championship semi-finalists who forfeited.) Switzerland qualified for only the second time ever, their first return to the U-17 World Cup since winning it in 2009.

Ecuador, Iran, Poland and Spain failed to qualify having appeared at the 2023 edition. Record champions Nigeria did not qualify for the second consecutive tournament.

Qualifying tournament	Team	Qualification date	Appearance(s)				Previous best performance
Qualifying tournament	Team	Qualification date	Total	First	Last	Streak	Previous best performance
Host nation	Qatar	14 March 2024	8th	1985	2005	1	Fourth place (1991)
2025 AFC U-17 Asian Cup	Saudi Arabia	6 April 2025	4th	1985	1989	1	Champions (1989)
2025 AFC U-17 Asian Cup	Uzbekistan	6 April 2025	4th	2011	2023	2	Quarter-finals (2011, 2023)
2025 AFC U-17 Asian Cup	Indonesia	7 April 2025	2nd	2023		2	Group stage (2023)
2025 AFC U-17 Asian Cup	Japan	10 April 2025	11th	1993	2023	4	Quarter-finals (1993, 2011)
2025 AFC U-17 Asian Cup	South Korea	10 April 2025	8th	1987	2023	3	Quarter-finals (1987, 2009, 2019)
2025 AFC U-17 Asian Cup	United Arab Emirates	10 April 2025	4th	1991	2013	1	Round of 16 (2009)
2025 AFC U-17 Asian Cup	North Korea	11 April 2025	6th	2005	2017	1	Quarter-finals (2005)
2025 AFC U-17 Asian Cup	Tajikistan	11 April 2025	3rd	2007	2019	1	Round of 16 (2007)
2025 U-17 Africa Cup of Nations	Burkina Faso	3 April 2025	6th	1999	2023	2	Third place (2001)
2025 U-17 Africa Cup of Nations	Mali	4 April 2025	7th	1997	2023	2	Runners-up (2015)
2025 U-17 Africa Cup of Nations	Morocco	6 April 2025	3rd	2013	2023	2	Quarter-finals (2023)
2025 U-17 Africa Cup of Nations	South Africa	6 April 2025	2nd	2015		1	Group stage (2015)
2025 U-17 Africa Cup of Nations	Zambia	6 April 2025	1st	Debut			
2025 U-17 Africa Cup of Nations	Ivory Coast	7 April 2025	5th	1987	2013	1	Third place (1987)
2025 U-17 Africa Cup of Nations	Senegal	7 April 2025	3rd	2019	2023	3	Round of 16 (2019, 2023)
2025 U-17 Africa Cup of Nations	Tunisia	7 April 2025	4th	1993	2013	1	Round of 16 (2007, 2013)
2025 U-17 Africa Cup of Nations	Egypt	12 April 2025	3rd	1987	1997	1	Quarter-finals (1997)
2025 U-17 Africa Cup of Nations	Uganda	12 April 2025	1st	Debut			
2025 CONCACAF U-17 World Cup qualification	El Salvador	15 February 2025	1st	Debut			
2025 CONCACAF U-17 World Cup qualification	Honduras	15 February 2025	6th	2007	2017	1	Quarter-finals (2013)
2025 CONCACAF U-17 World Cup qualification	Panama	15 February 2025	4th	2011	2023	2	Round of 16 (2011)
2025 CONCACAF U-17 World Cup qualification	United States	15 February 2025	19th	1985	2023	5	Fourth place (1999)
2025 CONCACAF U-17 World Cup qualification	Canada	16 February 2025	9th	1987	2023	3	Group stage (eight times) (Note: Canada finished in the group stage in 1987, 1989, 1993, 1995, 2011, 2013, 2019 and 2023.)
2025 CONCACAF U-17 World Cup qualification	Costa Rica	16 February 2025	11th	1985	2017	1	Quarter-finals (four times) (Note: Costa Rica reached the quarter-finals in 2001, 2003, 2005 and 2015.)
2025 CONCACAF U-17 World Cup qualification	Haiti	16 February 2025	3rd	2007	2019	1	Group stage (2007, 2019)
2025 CONCACAF U-17 World Cup qualification	Mexico	16 February 2025	16th	1985	2023	8	Champions (2005, 2011)
2025 South American U-17 Championship	Brazil	5 April 2025	19th	1985	2023	15	Champions (1997, 1999, 2003, 2019)
2025 South American U-17 Championship	Chile	5 April 2025	6th	1993	2019	1	Third place (1993)
2025 South American U-17 Championship	Colombia	5 April 2025	7th	1989	2017	1	Fourth place (2003, 2009)
2025 South American U-17 Championship	Venezuela	5 April 2025	3rd	2013	2023	2	Round of 16 (2023)
2025 South American U-17 Championship	Argentina	8 April 2025	16th	1985	2023	3	Third place (1991, 1995, 2003)
2025 South American U-17 Championship	Paraguay	8 April 2025	6th	1999	2019	1	Quarter-finals (1999, 2019)
2025 South American U-17 Championship	Bolivia	11 April 2025	3rd	1985	1987	1	Group stage (1985, 1987)
2024 OFC U-16 Men's Championship	Fiji	7 August 2024	1st	Debut			
2024 OFC U-16 Men's Championship	New Zealand	7 August 2024	11th	1997	2023	9	Round of 16 (2009, 2011, 2015)
2024 OFC U-16 Men's Championship	New Caledonia	10 August 2024	3rd	2017	2023	2	Group stage (2017, 2023)
2025 UEFA U-17 Euro qualification	Belgium	22 March 2025	3rd	2007	2015	1	Third place (2015)
2025 UEFA U-17 Euro qualification	England	22 March 2025	6th	2007	2023	2	Champions (2017)
2025 UEFA U-17 Euro qualification	Austria	25 March 2025	3rd	1997	2013	1	Group stage (1997, 2013)
2025 UEFA U-17 Euro qualification	Croatia	25 March 2025	4th	2001	2015	1	Quarter-finals (2015)
2025 UEFA U-17 Euro qualification	Czech Republic	25 March 2025	3rd (Note: Includes appearances by now-defunct Czechoslovakia, as FIFA considers both the Czech Republic and Slovakia as a successor of a team.)	1993	2011	1	Quarter-finals (1993)
2025 UEFA U-17 Euro qualification	France	25 March 2025	9th	1987	2023	5	Champions (2001)
2025 UEFA U-17 Euro qualification	Germany	25 March 2025	12th (Note: Includes appearances by now-defunct West Germany.)	1985	2023	2	Champions (2023)
2025 UEFA U-17 Euro qualification	Italy	25 March 2025	9th	1985	2019	1	Fourth place (1987)
2025 UEFA U-17 Euro qualification	Portugal	25 March 2025	4th	1989	2003	1	Third place (1989)
2025 UEFA U-17 Euro qualification	Republic of Ireland	25 March 2025	1st	Debut			
2025 UEFA U-17 Euro qualification	Switzerland	25 March 2025	2nd	2009		1	Champions (2009)

=== Seeding ===
The 48 teams were drawn into twelve groups of four teams. The hosts Qatar were automatically seeded to Pot 1 and into the first position of Group A, while the remaining teams were seeded into pots based on their results in the last five FIFA U-17 World Cups (with more recent tournaments weighted more heavily, using a points-based ranking system as outlined by FIFA).

Pot	Team	Confederation	2013	2015	2017	2019	2023	Total points
Pot	Team	Confederation	Points (20%)	Points (40%)	Points (60%)	Points (80%)	Points (100%)	Total points
1	Qatar (H)	AFC	Host nation, automatically assigned to Pot 1					
1	Brazil	CONMEBOL	2.6	3.6	10.8	16.8	9	42.8
1	France	UEFA	DNQ	4	5.4	14.4	17	40.8
1	Mali	CAF	DNQ	6.4	7.2	DNQ	15	28.6
1	Germany	UEFA	DNQ	2.4	5.4	DNQ	17	24.8
1	Mexico	CONCACAF	2.6	5.2	1.2	8.8	4	21.8
1	Argentina	CONMEBOL	2.6	0	DNQ	5.6	13	21.2
1	England	UEFA	DNQ	0.8	11.4	DNQ	6	18.2
1	Japan	AFC	1.8	DNQ	3	5.6	6	16.4
1	Paraguay	CONMEBOL	DNQ	1.2	5.4	8	DNQ	14.6
1	United States	CONCACAF	DNQ	0.4	5.4	0.8	6	12.6
1	Senegal	CAF	DNQ	DNQ	DNQ	4.8	7	11.8
2	South Korea	AFC	DNQ	2.8	DNQ	7.2	0	10
2	Morocco	CAF	1.4	DNQ	DNQ	DNQ	7	8.4
2	Uzbekistan	AFC	1.4	DNQ	DNQ	DNQ	7	8.4
2	Italy	UEFA	1.2	DNQ	DNQ	7.2	DNQ	8.4
2	Belgium	UEFA	DNQ	5.2	DNQ	DNQ	DNQ	5.2
2	New Zealand	OFC	0	1.6	0.6	2.4	0	4.6
2	Chile	CONMEBOL	DNQ	1.6	0.6	2.4	DNQ	4.6
2	Venezuela	CONMEBOL	0	DNQ	DNQ	DNQ	4	4
2	Croatia	UEFA	0.6	3.2	DNQ	DNQ	DNQ	3.8
2	Colombia	CONMEBOL	DNQ	DNQ	3.6	DNQ	DNQ	3.6
2	Honduras	CONCACAF	1.4	0	1.8	DNQ	DNQ	3.2
2	Burkina Faso	CAF	DNQ	DNQ	DNQ	DNQ	3	3
3	Costa Rica	CONCACAF	DNQ	2	0.6	DNQ	DNQ	2.6
3	Tajikistan	AFC	DNQ	DNQ	DNQ	2.4	DNQ	2.4
3	Panama	CONCACAF	0	DNQ	DNQ	DNQ	2	2
3	Indonesia	AFC	DNQ	DNQ	DNQ	DNQ	2	2
3	North Korea	AFC	DNQ	1.6	0	DNQ	DNQ	1.6
3	Ivory Coast	CAF	1.4	DNQ	DNQ	DNQ	DNQ	1.4
3	Tunisia	CAF	1.2	DNQ	DNQ	DNQ	DNQ	1.2
3	New Caledonia	OFC	DNQ	DNQ	0.6	DNQ	0	0.6
3	Canada	CONCACAF	0.4	DNQ	DNQ	DNQ	0	0.4
3	South Africa	CAF	DNQ	0.4	DNQ	DNQ	DNQ	0.4
3	Austria	UEFA	0.2	DNQ	DNQ	DNQ	DNQ	0.2
3	Haiti	CONCACAF	DNQ	DNQ	DNQ	0	DNQ	0
4	United Arab Emirates	AFC	0	DNQ	DNQ	DNQ	DNQ	0
4	Portugal	UEFA	DNQ	DNQ	DNQ	DNQ	DNQ	0
4	Czech Republic	UEFA	DNQ	DNQ	DNQ	DNQ	DNQ	0
4	Republic of Ireland	UEFA	DNQ	DNQ	DNQ	DNQ	DNQ	0
4	Switzerland	UEFA	DNQ	DNQ	DNQ	DNQ	DNQ	0
4	Zambia	CAF	DNQ	DNQ	DNQ	DNQ	DNQ	0
4	Egypt	CAF	DNQ	DNQ	DNQ	DNQ	DNQ	0
4	Uganda	CAF	DNQ	DNQ	DNQ	DNQ	DNQ	0
4	Bolivia	CONMEBOL	DNQ	DNQ	DNQ	DNQ	DNQ	0
4	Saudi Arabia	AFC	DNQ	DNQ	DNQ	DNQ	DNQ	0
4	El Salvador	CONCACAF	DNQ	DNQ	DNQ	DNQ	DNQ	0
4	Fiji	OFC	DNQ	DNQ	DNQ	DNQ	DNQ	0

=== Draw ===
The draw took place on 25 May 2025 in Doha, Qatar. The draw began with teams from pot one being drawn first and placed in the first position of their groups (hosts Qatar automatically assigned to A1). The draw then proceeded with teams from pot 2, followed by pot 3 and pot 4, with each team drawn into one of the positions within their group. No group could contain more than one team from the same confederation.

== Match officials ==
On 21 August 2025, FIFA confirmed that 81 match officials from 35 member associations would be selected for the tournament. This included 27 referees and 54 assistant referees. Football video support was in use for the competition.

Confederation	Referee	Assistant referees
AFC	(Saudi Arabia) Faisal Al-Balawi	(Saudi Arabia) Faisal Al-Qahtani (Saudi Arabia) Ibrahim Al-Dakhil
AFC	(Qatar) Mohammed Al-Shammari	(Qatar) Khaled Khalaf (Qatar) Faisal Al-Shammari
AFC	(South Korea) Choi Hyun-jai	(South Korea) Bang Gi-yeol (South Korea) Cheon Jin-hee
AFC	(Japan) Hiroki Kasahara	(Japan) Takeshi Asada (Japan) Satoshi Michiyama
AFC	(Uzbekistan) Rustam Lutfullin	(Uzbekistan) Sanjar Shayusupov (Uzbekistan) Akmal Giyosov
CAF	(South Africa) Jelly Chavani	(Eritrea) Sirak Samuel Mengis (Tanzania) Hamdani Ally
CAF	(Morocco) Hamza El Fariq	(Morocco) Hamza Naciri (Tunisia) Ahmed Dhouioui
CAF	(Gabon) Tanguy Mebiame	(Benin) Salim Alao (Gabon) Amos Abeigne Ndong
CAF	(Cameroon) Abdou Mefire	(Djibouti) Eleyeh Robleh Dirir (Liberia) Joel Doe
CONCACAF	(Dominican Republic) Adonis Carrasco	(Dominican Republic) José Bare Milano (Dominican Republic) Lendy Taveras
CONCACAF	(Canada) Filip Dujic	(Canada) Stefan Tanaka-Freundt (Canada) Gerard-Kader Lebuis
CONCACAF	(Costa Rica) Steven Madrigal	(Costa Rica) Jeriel Valverde (Costa Rica) Luis Granados
CONCACAF	(Trinidad and Tobago) Kwinsi Williams	(Trinidad and Tobago) Ainsley Rochard (Trinidad and Tobago) Kirt Charles
CONMEBOL	(Venezuela) Yender Herrera	(Venezuela) Antoni García (Venezuela) Erizon Nieto
CONMEBOL	(Bolivia) Ivo Méndez	(Bolivia) Jesús Antelo (Bolivia) William Medina
CONMEBOL	(Paraguay) Derlis López	(Paraguay) Roberto Cañete (Paraguay) Eduardo Britos
CONMEBOL	(Brazil) Paulo Zanovelli	(Brazil) Nailton Sousa (Brazil) Luanderson Lima
CONMEBOL	(Peru) Roberto Pérez	(Peru) Leonar Soto (Peru) José Castillo
CONMEBOL	(Chile) Fernando Véjar	(Chile) Juan Serrano (Chile) Carlos Poblete
OFC	(Solomon Islands) Ben Aukwai	(Samoa) Malaetala Salanoa (New Zealand) Garet Sheehan
UEFA	(Romania) Marian Barbu	(Romania) Mircea Grigoriu (Romania) George Neacsu
UEFA	(Italy) Andrea Colombo	(Italy) Giorgio Peretti (Italy) Giuseppe Perrotti
UEFA	(Ukraine) Oleksii Derevinskyi	(Ukraine) Oleksii Myronov (Ukraine) Viktor Mathias
UEFA	(Greece) Vasileios Fotias	(Greece) Andreas Meintanas (Greece) Michail Papadakis
UEFA	(Norway) Rohit Saggi	(Norway) Anders Dale (Norway) Jorgen Valstadsve
UEFA	(Netherlands) Sander van der Eijk	(Netherlands) Rens Bluemink (Netherlands) Stefan de Groot
UEFA	(Belgium) Jasper Vergoote	(Belgium) Michele Seeldraeyers (Belgium) Martijn Tiesters

== Group stage ==
=== Tiebreakers ===
Tie-breaking criteria for group play
The ranking of teams in the group stage was determined as follows:
1. Points obtained in all group matches (three points for a win, one for a draw, none for a defeat);
2. Points obtained in the matches played between the teams in question;
3. Goal difference in the matches played between the teams in question;
4. Number of goals scored in the matches played between the teams in question;
5. Goal difference in all group matches;
6. Number of goals scored in all group matches;
7. Fair play points in all group matches (only one deduction could be applied to a player in a single match):
  - Yellow card: −1 points;
  - Indirect red card (second yellow card): −3 points;
  - Direct red card: −4 points;
  - Yellow card and direct red card: −5 points;
8. Drawing of lots.

=== Group A ===
Pos	Team	Pld	W	D	L	GF	GA	GD	Pts	Qualification
1	Italy	3	3	0	0	8	1	+7	9	Knockout stage
2	South Africa	3	1	1	1	5	5	0	4	Knockout stage
3	Qatar (H)	3	0	2	1	1	2	−1	2	
4	Bolivia	3	0	1	2	1	7	−6	1	

Source: FIFA
Rules for classification: Group stage tiebreakers
(H) Hosts
3 November 2025
15:30

South Africa	3–1	Bolivia
Witbooi 38'; Bohloko 50'; Els 90+5'	Report	Maraude 72' (pen.)

Aspire Zone (pitch 3), Al Rayyan
Referee: Hiroki Kasahara (Japan)
3 November 2025
18:45

Qatar	0–1	Italy
	Report	Inácio 19'

Aspire Zone (pitch 7), Al Rayyan
Referee: Paulo Zanovelli (Brazil)

6 November 2025
15:30

Bolivia	0–4	Italy
	Report	Lontani 34'; Inácio 37'; Elimoghale 54'; Pandolfi 90+8'

Aspire Zone (pitch 3), Al Rayyan
Referee: Choi Hyun-jai (South Korea)
6 November 2025
18:45

Qatar	1–1	South Africa
Mohamed 3'	Report	Witbooi 16'

Aspire Zone (pitch 7), Al Rayyan
Referee: Fernando Véjar (Chile)

9 November 2025
18:45

Bolivia	0–0	Qatar
	Report

Aspire Zone (pitch 7), Al Rayyan
Referee: Rohit Saggi (Norway)
9 November 2025
18:45

Italy	3–1	South Africa
Inácio 4', 58'; Arena 55'	Report	Els 32'

Aspire Zone (pitch 9), Al Rayyan
Referee: Hiroki Kasahara (Japan)

=== Group B ===
Pos	Team	Pld	W	D	L	GF	GA	GD	Pts	Qualification
1	Japan	3	2	1	0	4	1	+3	7	Knockout stage
2	Portugal	3	2	0	1	13	3	+10	6	Knockout stage
3	Morocco	3	1	0	2	16	8	+8	3	Knockout stage
4	New Caledonia	3	0	1	2	1	22	−21	1	

Source: FIFA
Rules for classification: Group stage tiebreakers
3 November 2025
16:30

Japan	2–0	Morocco
Seguchi 57'; Hirashima 90+8'	Report

Aspire Zone (pitch 5), Al Rayyan
Referee: Andrea Colombo (Italy)
3 November 2025
18:15

New Caledonia	1–6	Portugal
Wamowe 11' (pen.)	Report	Anísio 22', 47'; Stevan 53'; Mide 59'; Furtado 85'; Neto 90+7'

Aspire Zone (pitch 4), Al Rayyan
Referee: Jelly Chavani (South Africa)

6 November 2025
15:30

Portugal	6–0	Morocco
Aragão 20'; Anísio 22'; Mide 29', 44' (pen.); Neto 46', 60'	Report

Aspire Zone (pitch 8), Al Rayyan
Referee: Roberto Pérez (Peru)
6 November 2025
16:00

Japan	0–0	New Caledonia
	Report

Aspire Zone (pitch 1), Al Rayyan
Referee: Kwinsi Williams (Trinidad and Tobago)

9 November 2025
16:30

Portugal	1–2	Japan
Zeega 80'	Report	Wada 35'; Seguchi 45'

Aspire Zone (pitch 5), Al Rayyan
Referee: Fernando Véjar (Chile)
9 November 2025
16:30

Morocco	16–0	New Caledonia
Soukrat 3'; Haddani 11', 56', 59'; Ibn Salah 18'; Eddaoudi 41', 42'; Hidaoui 44'; Baha 45+2', 50'; El Khalfioui 48'; Ouazane 73', 90+2'; Andrew 76' (o.g.); El Aoud 80', 90'	Report

Aspire Zone (pitch 1), Al Rayyan
Referee: Choi Hyun-jai (South Korea)

=== Group C ===
Pos	Team	Pld	W	D	L	GF	GA	GD	Pts	Qualification
1	Senegal	3	2	1	0	6	0	+6	7	Knockout stage
2	Croatia	3	2	1	0	6	1	+5	7	Knockout stage
3	Costa Rica	3	0	1	2	2	5	−3	1	
4	United Arab Emirates	3	0	1	2	1	9	−8	1	

Source: FIFA
Rules for classification: Group stage tiebreakers
3 November 2025
15:30

Costa Rica	1–1	United Arab Emirates
Bennette 62'	Report	Adel 59'

Aspire Zone (pitch 8), Al Rayyan
Referee: Marian Barbu (Romania)
3 November 2025
16:00

Senegal	0–0	Croatia
	Report

Aspire Zone (pitch 1), Al Rayyan
Referee: Fernando Véjar (Chile)

6 November 2025
16:15

United Arab Emirates	0–3	Croatia
	Report	Kusanović 30'; Šivalec 36'; Radoš 89'

Aspire Zone (pitch 4), Al Rayyan
Referee: Ivo Méndez (Bolivia)
6 November 2025
16:45

Senegal	1–0	Costa Rica
Camara 8'	Report

Aspire Zone (pitch 9), Al Rayyan
Referee: Hiroki Kasahara (Japan)

9 November 2025
17:45

United Arab Emirates	0–5	Senegal
	Report	E. Cissé 14' (pen.); Sonko 19', 41', 60'; Mendy 74'

Aspire Zone (pitch 2), Al Rayyan
Referee: Roberto Pérez (Peru)
9 November 2025
17:45

Croatia	3–1	Costa Rica
Radoš 35'; Kumar 55'; Kusanović 89'	Report	Cordero 58'

Aspire Zone (pitch 4), Al Rayyan
Referee: Jelly Chavani (South Africa)

=== Group D ===
Pos	Team	Pld	W	D	L	GF	GA	GD	Pts	Qualification
1	Argentina	3	3	0	0	11	2	+9	9	Knockout stage
2	Belgium	3	2	0	1	11	3	+8	6	Knockout stage
3	Tunisia	3	1	0	2	6	3	+3	3	Knockout stage
4	Fiji	3	0	0	3	0	20	−20	0	

Source: FIFA
Rules for classification: Group stage tiebreakers
3 November 2025
17:45

Argentina	3–2	Belgium
Tulián 36'; Jainikoski 68'; Esquivel 71'	Report	De Kimpe 45+4'; Naert 59'

Aspire Zone (pitch 2), Al Rayyan
Referee: Rustam Lutfullin (Uzbekistan)
3 November 2025
18:45

Tunisia	6–0	Fiji
W. Slama 30', 53'; Tayechi 36', 86'; Saidi 74'; Haj Abdallah 80'	Report

Aspire Zone (pitch 9), Al Rayyan
Referee: Ivo Méndez (Bolivia)

6 November 2025
16:30

Argentina	1–0	Tunisia
Jainikoski 67'	Report

Aspire Zone (pitch 5), Al Rayyan
Referee: Andrea Colombo (Italy)
6 November 2025
17:45

Fiji	0–7	Belgium
	Report	Fernandez 5'; Capilla Rivera 9'; Mitongo 22', 34', 77', 86'; Alvarez 29'

Aspire Zone (pitch 2), Al Rayyan
Referee: Jelly Chavani (South Africa)

9 November 2025
15:30

Fiji	0–7	Argentina
	Report	Ojeda 17', 57', 88'; Martínez 30', 43'; Silveira 89'; Sukabula 90+1' (o.g.)

Aspire Zone (pitch 3), Al Rayyan
Referee: Kwinsi Williams (Trinidad and Tobago)
9 November 2025
15:30

Belgium	2–0	Tunisia
Fernandez 1'; Camara 55'	Report

Aspire Zone (pitch 8), Al Rayyan
Referee: Ivo Méndez (Bolivia)

=== Group E ===
Pos	Team	Pld	W	D	L	GF	GA	GD	Pts	Qualification
1	Venezuela	3	2	1	0	8	3	+5	7	Knockout stage
2	England	3	2	0	1	11	4	+7	6	Knockout stage
3	Egypt	3	1	1	1	5	5	0	4	Knockout stage
4	Haiti	3	0	0	3	4	16	−12	0	

Source: FIFA
Rules for classification: Group stage tiebreakers
4 November 2025
16:30

Haiti	1–4	Egypt
Pierre 20'	Report	Attia 3'; El Zoghby 11'; Abdelkarim 27'; Kamal 72'

Aspire Zone (pitch 5), Al Rayyan
Referee: Jasper Vergoote (Belgium)
4 November 2025
18:15

England	0–3	Venezuela
	Report	Davis 40'; Fuentes 45'; Barrios 90+3'

Aspire Zone (pitch 4), Al Rayyan
Referee: Filip Dujic (Canada)

7 November 2025
15:30

England	8–1	Haiti
Williams-Barnett 1', 64'; Heskey 14' (pen.); Walsh 21'; Gomes Rodríguez 55'; Ezenwata 58', 69', 80'	Report	Celestin 17'

Aspire Zone (pitch 3), Al Rayyan
Referee: Mohammed Al-Shammari (Qatar)
7 November 2025
16:30

Egypt	1–1	Venezuela
Abdelkarim 54'	Report	Maitán 18'

Aspire Zone (pitch 5), Al Rayyan
Referee: Rustam Lutfullin (Uzbekistan)

10 November 2025
18:45

Egypt	0–3	England
	Report	Heskey 14', 56'; Miles 90'

Aspire Zone (pitch 7), Al Rayyan
Referee: Paulo Zanovelli (Brazil)
10 November 2025
18:45

Venezuela	4–2	Haiti
Claut 6'; Mancilla 14' (pen.); García 80', 90+4' (pen.)	Report	Jacquet 41'; Félix 72'

Aspire Zone (pitch 9), Al Rayyan
Referee: Faisal Al-Balawi (Saudi Arabia)

=== Group F ===
Pos	Team	Pld	W	D	L	GF	GA	GD	Pts	Qualification
1	Switzerland	3	2	1	0	7	2	+5	7	Knockout stage
2	South Korea	3	2	1	0	5	2	+3	7	Knockout stage
3	Mexico	3	1	0	2	3	5	−2	3	Knockout stage
4	Ivory Coast	3	0	0	3	2	8	−6	0	

Source: FIFA
Rules for classification: Group stage tiebreakers
4 November 2025
15:30

Ivory Coast	1–4	Switzerland
Yao 81'	Report	Zufferey 12'; Llukes 41'; Koloto 52'; Stiel 67'

Aspire Zone (pitch 8), Al Rayyan
Referee: Mohammed Al-Shammari (Qatar)
4 November 2025
16:00

Mexico	1–2	South Korea
De Nigris 44'	Report	Koo Hyeon-bin 19'; Ian Nam 49'

Aspire Zone (pitch 1), Al Rayyan
Referee: Abdou Mefire (Cameroon)

7 November 2025
17:45

Mexico	1–0	Ivory Coast
Olvera 74'	Report

Aspire Zone (pitch 2), Al Rayyan
Referee: Faisal Al-Balawi (Saudi Arabia)
7 November 2025
18:15

Switzerland	0–0	South Korea
	Report

Aspire Zone (pitch 4), Al Rayyan
Referee: Filip Dujic (Canada)

10 November 2025
15:30

Switzerland	3–1	Mexico
Mijajlovic 17', 58'; López 20' (o.g.)	Report	De Nigris 57'

Aspire Zone (pitch 3), Al Rayyan
Referee: Hamza El Fariq (Morocco)
10 November 2025
15:30

South Korea	3–1	Ivory Coast
Kim Ji-sung 26'; Jeong Hyeong-ung 48'; Yi Yong-hyeon 87' (pen.)	Report	Touré 35'

Aspire Zone (pitch 8), Al Rayyan
Referee: Derlis López (Paraguay)

=== Group G ===
Pos	Team	Pld	W	D	L	GF	GA	GD	Pts	Qualification
1	Germany	3	1	2	0	9	2	+7	5	Knockout stage
2	Colombia	3	1	2	0	3	1	+2	5	Knockout stage
3	North Korea	3	1	1	1	6	3	+3	4	Knockout stage
4	El Salvador	3	0	1	2	0	12	−12	1	

Source: FIFA
Rules for classification: Group stage tiebreakers
4 November 2025
17:45

Germany	1–1	Colombia
Langsteiner 1'	Report	Cataño 57'

Aspire Zone (pitch 2), Al Rayyan
Referee: Hamza El Fariq (Morocco)
4 November 2025
18:45

North Korea	5–0	El Salvador
Ri Kang-rim 14', 68'; Kim Yu-jin 45+1' (pen.), 88'; Han Il-bok 90+5'	Report

Aspire Zone (pitch 9), Al Rayyan
Referee: Tanguy Mebiame (Gabon)

7 November 2025
15:30

El Salvador	0–0	Colombia
	Report

Aspire Zone (pitch 8), Al Rayyan
Referee: Marian Barbu (Romania)
7 November 2025
16:00

Germany	1–1	North Korea
Mike 62'	Report	Han Il-bok 81'

Aspire Zone (pitch 1), Al Rayyan
Referee: Paulo Zanovelli (Brazil)

10 November 2025
16:30

El Salvador	0–7	Germany
	Report	Mensah 32', 57'; Staff 41'; Mike 45'; Reyes 52' (o.g.); Eickel 69'; Prenaj 84'

Aspire Zone (pitch 5), Al Rayyan
Referee: Mohammed Al-Shammari (Qatar)
10 November 2025
16:30

Colombia	2–0	North Korea
Solarte 25'; Londoño 33' (pen.)	Report

Aspire Zone (pitch 1), Al Rayyan
Referee: Andrea Colombo (Italy)

=== Group H ===
Pos	Team	Pld	W	D	L	GF	GA	GD	Pts	Qualification
1	Brazil	3	2	1	0	12	1	+11	7	Knockout stage
2	Zambia	3	2	1	0	9	4	+5	7	Knockout stage
3	Indonesia	3	1	0	2	3	8	−5	3	
4	Honduras	3	0	0	3	3	14	−11	0	

Source: FIFA
Rules for classification: Group stage tiebreakers
4 November 2025
15:30

Brazil	7–0	Honduras
Ruan Pablo 9'; Dell 15', 45+4'; Felipe Morais 19'; Vitor Hugo 59'; Angelo 74'; Gabriel Mec 90'	Report

Aspire Zone (pitch 3), Al Rayyan
Referee: Faisal Al-Balawi (Saudi Arabia)
4 November 2025
18:45

Indonesia	1–3	Zambia
Gholy 12'	Report	Nyirongo 35', 37'; Mwale 41'

Aspire Zone (pitch 7), Al Rayyan
Referee: Adonis Carrasco (Dominican Republic)

7 November 2025
18:45

Brazil	4–0	Indonesia
Luis Eduardo 3'; Panji 33' (o.g.); Felipe Morais 39'; Ruan Pablo 75'	Report

Aspire Zone (pitch 7), Al Rayyan
Referee: Hamza El Fariq (Morocco)
7 November 2025
18:45

Zambia	5–2	Honduras
Chipelu 5'; Phiri 14'; Sibeene 40'; Daka 72'; Nyirongo 88'	Report	Arriola 44'; Flores 52'

Aspire Zone (pitch 9), Al Rayyan
Referee: Jasper Vergoote (Belgium)

10 November 2025
17:45

Zambia	1–1	Brazil
Kalimina 26'	Report	Dell 81'

Aspire Zone (pitch 4), Al Rayyan
Referee: Ben Aukwai (Solomon Islands)
10 November 2025
17:45

Honduras	1–2	Indonesia
Suazo 54' (pen.)	Report	Evandra 52' (pen.); Fadly 72'

Aspire Zone (pitch 2), Al Rayyan
Referee: Marian Barbu (Romania)

=== Group I ===
Pos	Team	Pld	W	D	L	GF	GA	GD	Pts	Qualification
1	United States	3	3	0	0	4	1	+3	9	Knockout stage
2	Burkina Faso	3	2	0	1	4	2	+2	6	Knockout stage
3	Czech Republic	3	1	0	2	7	4	+3	3	Knockout stage
4	Tajikistan	3	0	0	3	2	10	−8	0	

Source: FIFA
Rules for classification: Group stage tiebreakers
5 November 2025
15:30

Tajikistan	1–6	Czech Republic
Nazriev 65'	Report	Škrkoň 12', 16', 19'; Potměšil 45+1', 90+6'; Zajac 90'

Aspire Zone (pitch 8), Al Rayyan
Referee: Ben Aukwai (Solomon Islands)
5 November 2025
18:15

United States	1–0	Burkina Faso
Sullivan 79'	Report

Aspire Zone (pitch 4), Al Rayyan
Referee: Sander van der Eijk (Netherlands)

8 November 2025
15:30

Czech Republic	1–2	Burkina Faso
Škrkoň 30'	Report	Zongo 27'; Tapsoba 50'

Aspire Zone (pitch 3), Al Rayyan
Referee: Adonis Carrasco (Dominican Republic)
8 November 2025
17:45

United States	2–1	Tajikistan
Berchimas 30'; Sullivan 61' (pen.)	Report	Nazriev 3'

Aspire Zone (pitch 2), Al Rayyan
Referee: Tanguy Mebiame (Gabon)

11 November 2025
17:45

Czech Republic	0–1	United States
	Report	Albert 78'

Aspire Zone (pitch 4), Al Rayyan
Referee: Yender Herrera (Venezuela)
11 November 2025
17:45

Burkina Faso	2–0	Tajikistan
Barro 79' (pen.); Ouattara 90+2'	Report

Aspire Zone (pitch 2), Al Rayyan
Referee: Jasper Vergoote (Belgium)

=== Group J ===
Pos	Team	Pld	W	D	L	GF	GA	GD	Pts	Qualification
1	Republic of Ireland	3	2	1	0	6	2	+4	7	Knockout stage
2	Uzbekistan	3	2	0	1	9	4	+5	6	Knockout stage
3	Paraguay	3	1	1	1	3	3	0	4	Knockout stage
4	Panama	3	0	0	3	3	12	−9	0	

Source: FIFA
Rules for classification: Group stage tiebreakers
5 November 2025
15:30

Panama	1–4	Republic of Ireland
Richards 89'	Report	Umeh 17'; McMahon-Brown 35'; M. Noonan 58'; Kovalevskis 61'

Aspire Zone (pitch 3), Al Rayyan
Referee: Yender Herrera (Venezuela)
5 November 2025
16:00

Paraguay	1–2	Uzbekistan
Ledesma 89' (pen.)	Report	Abdumuminov 25', 45+2'

Aspire Zone (pitch 1), Al Rayyan
Referee: Rohit Saggi (Norway)

8 November 2025
18:15

Paraguay	2–1	Panama
Aranda 51'; Villalba 54'	Report	Sanabria 90+4' (o.g.)

Aspire Zone (pitch 4), Al Rayyan
Referee: Vasileios Fotias (Greece)
8 November 2025
18:45

Republic of Ireland	2–1	Uzbekistan
McDonnell 33'; M. Noonan 75'	Report	Shukurullaev 20'

Aspire Zone (pitch 9), Al Rayyan
Referee: Abdou Mefire (Cameroon)

11 November 2025
16:30

Republic of Ireland	0–0	Paraguay
	Report

Aspire Zone (pitch 5), Al Rayyan
Referee: Filip Dujic (Canada)
11 November 2025
16:30

Uzbekistan	6–1	Panama
Shukurullaev 48'; Khasanov 53'; Sodikov 68'; Rustamov 90+1'; Aliev 90+4'; Saidov 90+7' (pen.)	Report	Pacheco 90+10'

Aspire Zone (pitch 1), Al Rayyan
Referee: Oleksii Derevinskyi (Ukraine)

=== Group K ===
Pos	Team	Pld	W	D	L	GF	GA	GD	Pts	Qualification
1	France	3	1	1	1	2	1	+1	4	Knockout stage
2	Canada	3	1	1	1	3	3	0	4	Knockout stage
3	Uganda	3	1	1	1	3	3	0	4	Knockout stage
4	Chile	3	1	1	1	3	4	−1	4	

Source: FIFA
Rules for classification: Group stage tiebreakers
5 November 2025
18:45

France	2–0	Chile
Batola 55'; Himbert 63'	Report

Aspire Zone (pitch 7), Al Rayyan
Referee: Steven Madrigal (Costa Rica)
5 November 2025
18:45

Canada	2–1	Uganda
Roche 88'; Aiyenero 90+8' (pen.)	Report	Bogere 25'

Aspire Zone (pitch 9), Al Rayyan
Referee: Oleksii Derevinskyi (Ukraine)

8 November 2025
15:30

Uganda	1–1	Chile
Ssozi 90+3'	Report	Torres 45+3'

Aspire Zone (pitch 8), Al Rayyan
Referee: Sander van der Eijk (Netherlands)
8 November 2025
16:30

France	0–0	Canada
	Report

Aspire Zone (pitch 5), Al Rayyan
Referee: Yender Herrera (Venezuela)

11 November 2025
15:30

Uganda	1–0	France
Bogere 18'	Report

Aspire Zone (pitch 3), Al Rayyan
Referee: Rustam Lutfullin (Uzbekistan)
11 November 2025
15:30

Chile	2–1	Canada
Yáñez 55'; Orellana 66'	Report	Jimoh 32'

Aspire Zone (pitch 8), Al Rayyan
Referee: Vasileios Fotias (Greece)

=== Group L ===
Pos	Team	Pld	W	D	L	GF	GA	GD	Pts	Qualification
1	Austria	3	3	0	0	8	1	+7	9	Knockout stage
2	Mali	3	2	0	1	5	3	+2	6	Knockout stage
3	Saudi Arabia	3	1	0	2	3	5	−2	3	
4	New Zealand	3	0	0	3	3	10	−7	0	

Source: FIFA
Rules for classification: Group stage tiebreakers
5 November 2025
15:30

Austria	1–0	Saudi Arabia
Moser 55' (pen.)	Report

Aspire Zone (pitch 5), Al Rayyan
Referee: Derlis López (Paraguay)
5 November 2025
17:45

Mali	3–0	New Zealand
Dembélé 17'; Ballo 55'; Bomba 78'	Report

Aspire Zone (pitch 2), Al Rayyan
Referee: Vasileios Fotias (Greece)

8 November 2025
16:00

Mali	0–3	Austria
	Report	Moser 36' (pen.); Deshishku 61'; Jozepovic 90+5'

Aspire Zone (pitch 1), Al Rayyan
Referee: Steven Madrigal (Costa Rica)
8 November 2025
18:45

Saudi Arabia	3–2	New Zealand
Sufyani 2'; Dahal 58'; Saeed 90+1'	Report	Núñez 55'; Perniskie 83'

Aspire Zone (pitch 7), Al Rayyan
Referee: Oleksii Derevinskyi (Ukraine)

11 November 2025
18:45

Saudi Arabia	0–2	Mali
	Report	Bomba 61'; Diakité 67'

Aspire Zone (pitch 7), Al Rayyan
Referee: Sander van der Eijk (Netherlands)
11 November 2025
18:45

New Zealand	1–4	Austria
Britton 82'	Report	Jozepovic 49'; Dobis 87'; Deshishku 88', 90+4'

Aspire Zone (pitch 9), Al Rayyan
Referee: Tanguy Mebiame (Gabon)

=== Ranking of third-placed teams ===
Tie-breaking criteria for qualified teams
The ranking of third-placed teams was determined as follows:
1. Points obtained in all group matches;
2. Goal difference in all group matches;
3. Number of goals scored in all group matches;
4. Fair play points in all group matches (only one deduction could be applied to a player in a single match):
  - Yellow card: −1 points;
  - Indirect red card (second yellow card): −3 points;
  - Direct red card: −4 points;
  - Yellow card and direct red card: −5 points;
5. Drawing of lots.

Pos	Grp	Team	Pld	W	D	L	GF	GA	GD	Pts	Qualification
1	G	North Korea	3	1	1	1	6	3	+3	4	Knockout stage
2	E	Egypt	3	1	1	1	5	5	0	4	Knockout stage
3	K	Uganda	3	1	1	1	3	3	0	4 (Note: Tied on fair play points (–5). Rank was drawn by lot.)	Knockout stage
4	J	Paraguay	3	1	1	1	3	3	0	4	Knockout stage
5	B	Morocco	3	1	0	2	16	8	+8	3	Knockout stage
6	I	Czech Republic	3	1	0	2	7	4	+3	3	Knockout stage
7	D	Tunisia	3	1	0	2	6	3	+3	3	Knockout stage
8	F	Mexico	3	1	0	2	3	5	−2	3 (Note: Fair play points: Mexico –7, Saudi Arabia –13.)	Knockout stage
9	L	Saudi Arabia	3	1	0	2	3	5	−2	3	
10	H	Indonesia	3	1	0	2	3	8	−5	3	
11	A	Qatar	3	0	2	1	1	2	−1	2	
12	C	Costa Rica	3	0	1	2	2	5	−3	1	

Source: FIFA
Rules for classification: Qualified teams tiebreakers

== Knockout stage ==
In the knockout stage, if a match was level at the end of normal playing time, no extra time was played and the winners were determined by penalty shoot-out.

=== Determination of knockout fixtures ===
The bracket was decided by means of a ranking based on the standings of all teams in the group stage. Teams from the same group could not meet in the round of 32.

==== Ranking of qualified teams ====
Teams were seeded based on their performance in the group stage.

Group winners
Pos	Grp	Team	Pld	W	D	L	GF	GA	GD	Pts
1	D	Argentina	3	3	0	0	11	2	+9	9
2	L	Austria	3	3	0	0	8	1	+7	9 (Note: Fair play points: Austria –5, Italy –6.)
3	A	Italy	3	3	0	0	8	1	+7	9
4	I	United States	3	3	0	0	4	1	+3	9
5	H	Brazil	3	2	1	0	12	1	+11	7
6	C	Senegal	3	2	1	0	6	0	+6	7
7	E	Venezuela	3	2	1	0	8	3	+5	7
8	F	Switzerland	3	2	1	0	7	2	+5	7
9	J	Republic of Ireland	3	2	1	0	6	2	+4	7
10	B	Japan	3	2	1	0	4	1	+3	7
11	G	Germany	3	1	2	0	9	2	+7	5
12	K	France	3	1	1	1	2	1	+1	4

Source: FIFA
Rules for classification: Qualified teams tiebreakers
Notes:

Group runners-up
Pos	Grp	Team	Pld	W	D	L	GF	GA	GD	Pts
1	H	Zambia	3	2	1	0	9	4	+5	7
2	C	Croatia	3	2	1	0	6	1	+5	7
3	F	South Korea	3	2	1	0	5	2	+3	7
4	B	Portugal	3	2	0	1	13	3	+10	6
5	D	Belgium	3	2	0	1	11	3	+8	6
6	E	England	3	2	0	1	11	4	+7	6
7	J	Uzbekistan	3	2	0	1	9	4	+5	6
8	L	Mali	3	2	0	1	5	3	+2	6
9	I	Burkina Faso	3	2	0	1	4	2	+2	6
10	G	Colombia	3	1	2	0	3	1	+2	5
11	A	South Africa	3	1	1	1	5	5	0	4
12	K	Canada	3	1	1	1	3	3	0	4

Source: FIFA
Rules for classification: Qualified teams tiebreakers

Third-placed teams
Pos	Grp	Team	Pld	W	D	L	GF	GA	GD	Pts
1	G	North Korea	3	1	1	1	6	3	+3	4
2	E	Egypt	3	1	1	1	5	5	0	4
3	K	Uganda	3	1	1	1	3	3	0	4 (Note: Tied on fair play points (–5). Rank was drawn by lot.)
4	J	Paraguay	3	1	1	1	3	3	0	4
5	B	Morocco	3	1	0	2	16	8	+8	3
6	I	Czech Republic	3	1	0	2	7	4	+3	3
7	D	Tunisia	3	1	0	2	6	3	+3	3
8	F	Mexico	3	1	0	2	3	5	−2	3

Source: FIFA
Rules for classification: Qualified teams tiebreakers

==== Knockout fixtures ====
The pairings for the round of 32 were predetermined according to the performance ranking of group winners, runners-up and third-placed teams from the group stage. The 1st-ranked group winner would face the 8th-ranked third place team, the 2nd-ranked group winner would face the 7th-ranked third place team, etc. However, teams from the same group could not face each other in the round of 32. Therefore, if such teams were due to face each other based on the rankings (which could apply to matches 73 to 84), the group winner would instead face the next possible team ranked higher.

=== Bracket ===
Round of 32
14 November
Argentina	2 (4)
Mexico (p)	2 (5)
14 November
Portugal	2
Belgium	1
14 November
Switzerland	3
Egypt	1
14 November
Republic of Ireland (p)	1 (9)
Canada	1 (8)
14 November
United States	1 (3)
Morocco (p)	1 (4)
14 November
Zambia	1
Mali	3
14 November
Brazil (p)	0 (5)
Paraguay	0 (4)
14 November
France	2
Colombia	0
15 November
Austria	2
Tunisia	0
15 November
South Korea	0
England	2
15 November
Venezuela	1
North Korea	2
15 November
Japan	3
South Africa	0
15 November
Italy	2
Czech Republic	0
15 November
Croatia	1 (3)
Uzbekistan (p)	1 (4)
15 November
Senegal	0
Uganda	1
15 November
Germany	0
Burkina Faso	1

Round of 16
18 November
Mexico	0
Portugal	5
18 November
Switzerland	3
Republic of Ireland	1
18 November
Morocco	3
Mali	2
18 November
Brazil (p)	1 (4)
France	1 (3)
18 November
Austria	4
England	0
18 November
North Korea	1 (4)
Japan (p)	1 (5)
18 November
Italy	3
Uzbekistan	2
18 November
Uganda	1 (3)
Burkina Faso (p)	1 (5)

Quarter-finals
21 November
Portugal	2
Switzerland	0
21 November
Morocco	1
Brazil	2
21 November
Austria	1
Japan	0
21 November
Italy	1
Burkina Faso	0

Semi-finals
24 November
Portugal (p)	0 (6)
Brazil	0 (5)
24 November
Austria	2
Italy	0

Final
27 November – Khalifa
Portugal	1
Austria	0
Third place play-off
27 November
Brazil	0 (2)
Italy (p)	0 (4)

=== Round of 32 ===
14 November 2025
15:30

Zambia	1–3	Mali
Simute 63'	Report	Bomba 51'; Dembélé 85'; Keita 90+2'

Aspire Zone (pitch 8), Al Rayyan
Referee: Yender Herrera (Venezuela)

14 November 2025
15:30

Portugal	2–1	Belgium
Anísio 38', 45+1'	Report	Fernandez 45+5'

Aspire Zone (pitch 3), Al Rayyan
Referee: Marian Barbu (Romania)

14 November 2025
16:00

Switzerland	3–1	Egypt
Scherrer 16'; Bruchez 39'; Stiel 58'	Report	Anas Roshdy 90+1'

Aspire Zone (pitch 5), Al Rayyan
Referee: Derlis López (Paraguay)

14 November 2025
16:30

France	2–0	Colombia
Valero 14'; Mounguengue 90+4'	Report

Aspire Zone (pitch 1), Al Rayyan
Referee: Filip Dujic (Canada)

14 November 2025
17:45

Argentina	2–2	Mexico
Tulián 9'; Closter 87'	Report	Gamboa 46', 58'
Penalties
Bouhier (penalty missed); Gómez Mattar (penalty scored); Closter (penalty scored); Satas (penalty scored); Jainikoski (penalty scored)	4–5	(penalty scored) Pineda; (penalty scored) Mancilla; (penalty scored) Hernández; (penalty scored) J. López; (penalty scored) S. López

Aspire Zone (pitch 2), Al Rayyan
Referee: Andrea Colombo (Italy)

14 November 2025
18:15

Republic of Ireland	1–1	Canada
M. Noonan 65'	Report	Kozlovskiy 85'
Penalties
M. Noonan (penalty scored); Sherlock (penalty scored); Umeh (penalty scored); Leonard (penalty scored); McDonagh (penalty missed); McMahon-Brown (penalty scored); Finneran (penalty scored); Ozhianvuna (penalty scored); McDonnell (penalty scored); Butler (penalty scored)	9–8	(penalty missed) Khan; (penalty scored) Aiyenero; (penalty scored) Kozlovskiy; (penalty scored) Parker; (penalty scored) Judelson; (penalty scored) Sadek; (penalty scored) Selemani; (penalty scored) Deo; (penalty scored) Nteziryayo; (penalty missed) Roche

Aspire Zone (pitch 4), Al Rayyan
Referee: Jelly Chavani (South Africa)

14 November 2025
18:45

United States	1–1	Morocco
Terry 21'	Report	Ouazane 90'
Penalties
Sullivan (penalty scored); Sanchez (penalty missed); Adams (penalty scored); Albert (penalty scored); Carrizo (penalty missed)	3–4	(penalty scored) Baha; (penalty scored) El Aoud; (penalty scored) Dardake; (penalty missed) Mouhoub; (penalty scored) Hidaoui

Aspire Zone (pitch 7), Al Rayyan
Referee: Roberto Pérez (Peru)

14 November 2025
18:45

Brazil	0–0	Paraguay
	Report
Penalties
Luis Eduardo (penalty missed); Tiago (penalty scored); Zé Lucas (penalty scored); Kayke (penalty scored); Tavares (penalty scored); Arthur Ryan (penalty missed); Pacheco (penalty scored)	5–4	(penalty scored) Ledesma; (penalty scored) Villalba; (penalty scored) Freyres; (penalty missed) Campss; (penalty scored) Coronel; (penalty missed) Cristaldo; (penalty missed) Buhring

Aspire Zone (pitch 9), Al Rayyan
Referee: Jasper Vergoote (Belgium)

15 November 2025
15:30

Senegal	0–1	Uganda
	Report	Walusimbi 15'

Aspire Zone (pitch 7), Al Rayyan
Referee: Paulo Zanovelli (Brazil)

15 November 2025
15:30

South Korea	0–2	England
	Report	Jung Hui-seop 28' (o.g.); Heskey 35'

Aspire Zone (pitch 8), Al Rayyan
Referee: Abdou Mefire (Cameroon)

15 November 2025
16:00

Italy	2–0	Czech Republic
Arena 52'; Maccaroni 78'	Report

Aspire Zone (pitch 1), Al Rayyan
Referee: Sander van der Eijk (Netherlands)

15 November 2025
16:30

Japan	3–0	South Africa
Asada 48'; Yoshida 59'; Fujii 72'	Report

Aspire Zone (pitch 3), Al Rayyan
Referee: Steven Madrigal (Costa Rica)

15 November 2025
17:45

Germany	0–1	Burkina Faso
	Report	Zongo 5'

Aspire Zone (pitch 2), Al Rayyan
Referee: Choi Hyun-jai (South Korea)

15 November 2025
18:15

Venezuela	1–2	North Korea
Uribe 62'	Report	Kim Yu-jin 13', 31' (pen.)

Aspire Zone (pitch 4), Al Rayyan
Referee: Rohit Saggi (Norway)

15 November 2025
18:45

Austria	2–0	Tunisia
Moser 83' (pen.); M. Slama 84' (o.g.)	Report

Aspire Zone (pitch 5), Al Rayyan
Referee: Kwinsi Williams (Trinidad and Tobago)

15 November 2025
18:45

Croatia	1–1	Uzbekistan
Kusanović 81'	Report	Khasanov 24'
Penalties
Pajsar (penalty missed); Šivalec (penalty scored); Kumar (penalty missed); Kusanović (penalty scored); Vojvodić (penalty scored)	3–4	(penalty missed) Khakimov; (penalty scored) Khabibullaev; (penalty scored) Saidmurodov; (penalty scored) Abdumuminov; (penalty scored) Khasanov

Aspire Zone (pitch 9), Al Rayyan
Referee: Tanguy Mebiame (Gabon)

=== Round of 16 ===
18 November 2025
15:30

Italy	3–2	Uzbekistan
Campaniello 19', 68'; Iddrisa 70'	Report	Muradov 56'; Erimbetov 90+4'

Aspire Zone (pitch 8), Al Rayyan
Referee: Ivo Méndez (Bolivia)

18 November 2025
15:30

Uganda	1–1	Burkina Faso
Nkoola 56'	Report	Bagayogo 77'
Penalties
Walusimbi (penalty scored); Wanyama (penalty scored); Ssozi (penalty missed); Sengooba (penalty scored)	3–5	(penalty scored) Barro; (penalty scored) Zongo; (penalty scored) Bagayogo; (penalty scored) M. Ouédraogo; (penalty scored) Dabo

Aspire Zone (pitch 5), Al Rayyan
Referee: Oleksii Derevinskyi (Ukraine)

18 November 2025
16:00

Mexico	0–5	Portugal
	Report	Quintas 15' (pen.); Anísio 48'; Zeega 81'; Figueiredo 83'; Pereira 85'

Aspire Zone (pitch 3), Al Rayyan
Referee: Fernando Véjar (Chile)

18 November 2025
16:30

Brazil	1–1	France
Tavares 89'	Report	Himbert 33'
Penalties
Dell (penalty scored); Pacheco (penalty scored); Gabriel Mec (penalty scored); Tavares (penalty missed); Ruan Pablo (penalty scored)	4–3	(penalty missed) Camara; (penalty scored) Mounguengue; (penalty scored) Nassoko; (penalty scored) Ameline; (penalty missed) Leccese

Aspire Zone (pitch 2), Al Rayyan
Referee: Rustam Lutfullin (Uzbekistan)

18 November 2025
17:45

Switzerland	3–1	Republic of Ireland
Llukes 57'; Wyss 68'; Mijajlovic 86'	Report	Leonard 82'

Aspire Zone (pitch 1), Al Rayyan
Referee: Mohammed Al-Shammari (Qatar)

18 November 2025
18:15

North Korea	1–1	Japan
Ri Hyok-gwang 67'	Report	McGhee 6'
Penalties
Ri Hyok-gwang (penalty scored); Han Il-bok (penalty missed); Choe Chung-hyok (penalty scored); Ri Kang-rim (penalty scored); Kim Yu-jin (penalty scored)	4–5	(penalty scored) Yoshida; (penalty scored) Motosuna; (penalty scored) Seguchi; (penalty scored) Hirashima; (penalty scored) Asada

Aspire Zone (pitch 4), Al Rayyan
Referee: Hamza El Fariq (Morocco)

18 November 2025
18:45

Austria	4–0	England
Deshishku 47'; Moser 70' (pen.), 79'; Ndukwe 86'	Report

Aspire Zone (pitch 9), Al Rayyan
Referee: Faisal Al-Balawi (Saudi Arabia)

18 November 2025
18:45

Morocco	3–2	Mali
Baha 29'; El Aoud 45+11', 66'	Report	Bomba 45+6' (pen.); Berthe 90+4'

Aspire Zone (pitch 7), Al Rayyan
Referee: Vasileios Fotias (Greece)

=== Quarter-finals ===
21 November 2025
15:30

Austria	1–0	Japan
Moser 49'	Report

Aspire Zone (pitch 3), Al Rayyan
Referee: Paulo Zanovelli (Brazil)

21 November 2025
16:30

Italy	1–0	Burkina Faso
Campaniello 83'	Report

Aspire Zone (pitch 5), Al Rayyan
Referee: Roberto Pérez (Peru)

21 November 2025
17:45

Portugal	2–0	Switzerland
Mide 41'; Neto 53'	Report

Aspire Zone (pitch 2), Al Rayyan
Referee: Choi Hyun-jai (South Korea)

21 November 2025
18:45

Morocco	1–2	Brazil
Baha 45+4' (pen.)	Report	Dell 16', 90+5'

Aspire Zone (pitch 7), Al Rayyan
Referee: Andrea Colombo (Italy)

=== Semi-finals ===
24 November 2025
16:30

Austria	2–0	Italy
Moser 57', 90+3'	Report

Aspire Zone (pitch 5), Al Rayyan
Referee: Fernando Véjar (Chile)

24 November 2025
19:00

Portugal	0–0	Brazil
	Report
Penalties
Soares (penalty scored); Chelmik (penalty scored); Verdi (penalty scored); Pereira (penalty scored); Cunha (penalty missed); Aragão (penalty scored); Neto (penalty scored)	6–5	(penalty scored) Dell; (penalty scored) Tiago; (penalty scored) Zé Lucas; (penalty scored) Pacheco; (penalty missed) Ruan Pablo; (penalty scored) Gabriel Mec; (penalty missed) Angelo

Aspire Zone (pitch 7), Al Rayyan
Referee: Vasileios Fotias (Greece)

=== Third place play-off ===
27 November 2025
15:30

Brazil	0–0	Italy
	Report
Penalties
Dell (penalty scored); Tiago (penalty scored); Pacheco (penalty missed); Luis Eduardo (penalty missed)	2–4	(penalty scored) Prisco; (penalty scored) Lontani; (penalty missed) Luongo; (penalty scored) Mambuku; (penalty scored) Baralla

Aspire Zone (pitch 7), Al Rayyan
Referee: Choi Hyun-jai (South Korea)

=== Final ===
27 November 2025
19:00

Portugal	1–0	Austria
Anísio 32'	Report

Khalifa International Stadium, Al Rayyan
Referee: Roberto Pérez (Peru)

== Awards ==
The following awards were given at the conclusion of the tournament. They were all sponsored by Adidas, except for the FIFA Fair Play Trophy.

Golden Ball	Silver Ball	Bronze Ball
(Portugal) Mateus Mide	(Austria) Johannes Moser	(Portugal) Mauro Furtado
Golden Boot	Silver Boot	Bronze Boot
(Austria) Johannes Moser (8 goals)	(Portugal) Anísio Cabral (7 goals)	(Brazil) Dell (5 goals)
Golden Glove
(Portugal) Romário Cunha
FIFA Fair Play Trophy
Czech Republic

== Goalscorers ==
There were 325 goals scored in 104 matches, for an average of 3.12 goals per match.

8 goals

- (Austria) Johannes Moser

7 goals

- (Portugal) Anísio Cabral

5 goals

- (Brazil) Dell

4 goals

- (Austria) Hasan Deshishku
- (Belgium) René Mitongo
- (Czech Republic) Vit Škrkoň
- (England) Reigan Heskey
- (Italy) Samuele Inácio
- (Mali) Raymond Bomba
- (Morocco) Ziyad Baha
- (Morocco) Ismail El Aoud
- (North Korea) Kim Yu-jin
- (Portugal) Mateus Mide
- (Portugal) José Neto

3 goals

- (Argentina) Uriel Ojeda
- (Belgium) Noah Fernandez
- (Croatia) Tino Kusanović
- (England) Chizaram Ezenwata
- (Italy) Thomas Campaniello
- (Mali) Seydou Dembélé
- (Morocco) Nahël Haddani
- (Morocco) Abdellah Ouazane
- (Republic of Ireland) Michael Noonan
- (Senegal) Bakary Sonko
- (Switzerland) Mladen Mijajlovic
- (Zambia) Abel Nyirongo

2 goals

- (Argentina) Facundo Jainikoski
- (Argentina) Mateo Martínez
- (Argentina) Ramiro Tulián
- (Austria) Nicolas Jozepovic
- (Brazil) Felipe Morais
- (Brazil) Ruan Pablo
- (Burkina Faso) Mohamed Zongo
- (Croatia) Krešimir Radoš
- (Czech Republic) Petr Potměšil
- (Egypt) Hamza Abdelkarim
- (England) Luca Williams-Barnett
- (France) Rémi Himbert
- (Germany) Jeremiah Mensah
- (Germany) Wisdom Mike
- (Italy) Antonio Arena
- (Japan) Taiga Seguchi
- (Mexico) Luis Gamboa
- (Mexico) Aldo de Nigris
- (Morocco) Abdelali Eddaoudi
- (Portugal) Zeega
- (North Korea) Han Il-bok
- (North Korea) Ri Kang-rim
- (South Africa) Shaun Els
- (South Africa) Emile Witbooi
- (Switzerland) Adrien Llukes
- (Switzerland) Jill Stiel
- (Tajikistan) Muhammad Nazriev
- (Tunisia) Wassim Slama
- (Tunisia) Fedi Tayechi
- (Uganda) James Bogere
- (United States) Cavan Sullivan
- (Uzbekistan) Azizbek Abdumuminov
- (Uzbekistan) Sadriddin Khasanov
- (Uzbekistan) Abubakir Shukurullaev
- (Venezuela) David García

1 goal

- (Argentina) Fernando Closter
- (Argentina) Felipe Esquivel
- (Argentina) Santiago Silveira
- (Austria) Dominik Dobis
- (Austria) Ifeanyi Ndukwe
- (Belgium) Arthur De Kimpe
- (Belgium) Stan Naert
- (Belgium) Loïc Alvarez
- (Belgium) Ali Camara
- (Belgium) Pablo Capilla Rivera
- (Bolivia) Jesús Maraude
- (Brazil) Angelo
- (Brazil) Luis Eduardo
- (Brazil) Vitor Hugo
- (Brazil) Gabriel Mec
- (Brazil) Pietro Tavares
- (Burkina Faso) Alassana Bagayogo
- (Burkina Faso) Cherif Barro
- (Burkina Faso) Eric Ouattara
- (Burkina Faso) Asharaf Tapsoba
- (Canada) Marius Aiyenero
- (Canada) Shola Jimoh
- (Canada) Sergei Kozlovskiy
- (Canada) Elijah Roche
- (Chile) Matías Orellana
- (Chile) Bruno Torres
- (Chile) Zidane Yáñez
- (Colombia) Juan Cataño
- (Colombia) Santiago Londoño
- (Colombia) Miguel Solarte
- (Costa Rica) Nick Bennette
- (Costa Rica) Thiago Cordero
- (Croatia) Raul Kumar
- (Croatia) Gabrijel Šivalec
- (Czech Republic) Dominik Zajac
- (Egypt) Belal Attia
- (Egypt) Abdelaziz El Zoghby
- (Egypt) Omar Kamal
- (Egypt) Anas Roshdy
- (England) Alejandro Gomes Rodríguez
- (England) Harrison Miles
- (England) Reggie Walsh
- (France) Christ Batola
- (France) Pierre Mounguengue
- (France) Antoine Valero
- (Germany) Lasse Eickel
- (Germany) Toni Langsteiner
- (Germany) Christian Prenaj
- (Germany) Alexander Staff
- (Haiti) Franco Celestin
- (Haiti) Woodson Félix
- (Haiti) Da-Benz Jacquet
- (Haiti) Nikolai Pierre
- (Honduras) Yeison Arriola
- (Honduras) Luis Suazo
- (Honduras) David Flores
- (Indonesia) Fadly Alberto
- (Indonesia) Evandra Florasta
- (Indonesia) Zahaby Gholy
- (Italy) Dauda Iddrisa
- (Italy) Destiny Elimoghale
- (Italy) Simone Lontani
- (Italy) Valerio Maccaroni
- (Italy) Fabio Pandolfi
- (Ivory Coast) Allassane Touré
- (Ivory Coast) Hubert Yao
- (Japan) Hiroto Asada
- (Japan) Shota Fujii
- (Japan) Daigo Hirashima
- (Japan) Jelani McGhee
- (Japan) Takeshi Wada
- (Japan) Minato Yoshida
- (Mali) Zoumana Ballo
- (Mali) Ibrahim Diakité
- (Mali) Lamine Keita
- (Mexico) Ian Olvera
- (Morocco) Zakari El Khalfioui
- (Morocco) Ilyas Hidaoui
- (Morocco) Bilal Soukrat
- (Morocco) Oualid Ibn Salah
- (New Caledonia) Ezekiel Wamowe
- (New Zealand) Will Britton
- (New Zealand) Matías Núñez
- (New Zealand) Jack Perniskie
- (Panama) Joseph Pacheco
- (Panama) Moisés Richards
- (Paraguay) Thiago Aranda
- (Paraguay) Alan Ledesma
- (Paraguay) Pedro Villalba
- (North Korea) Ri Hyok-gwang
- (Portugal) João Aragão
- (Portugal) Miguel Figueiredo
- (Portugal) Mauro Furtado
- (Portugal) Stevan Manuel
- (Portugal) Yoan Pereira
- (Portugal) Rafael Quintas
- (Qatar) Yazan Mohamed
- (Republic of Ireland) Max Kovalevskis
- (Republic of Ireland) Vinnie Leonard
- (Republic of Ireland) Grady McDonnell
- (Republic of Ireland) Kian McMahon-Brown
- (Republic of Ireland) Jaden Umeh
- (Saudi Arabia) Sabri Dahal
- (Saudi Arabia) Thari Saeed
- (Saudi Arabia) Abdulrahman Sufyani
- (Senegal) Alwaly Camara
- (Senegal) El Hadji Malick Cissé
- (Senegal) Victor Mendy
- (South Africa) Neo Bohloko
- (South Korea) Jeong Hyeong-ung
- (South Korea) Kim Ji-sung
- (South Korea) Koo Hyeon-bin
- (South Korea) Ian Nam
- (South Korea) Yi Yong-hyeon
- (Switzerland) Ethan Bruchez
- (Switzerland) Giacomo Koloto
- (Switzerland) Nevio Scherrer
- (Switzerland) Sandro Wyss
- (Switzerland) Gil Zufferey
- (Tunisia) Saïfedin Haj Abdallah
- (Tunisia) Anisse Saidi
- (Uganda) Arafat Nkoola
- (Uganda) Derick Ssozi
- (Uganda) Abubakar Walusimbi
- (United Arab Emirates) Mayed Adel
- (United States) Mathis Albert
- (United States) Nimfasha Berchimas
- (United States) Jude Terry
- (Uzbekistan) Asilbek Aliev
- (Uzbekistan) Azizbek Erimbetov
- (Uzbekistan) Amirkhon Muradov
- (Uzbekistan) Jamshidbek Rustamov
- (Uzbekistan) Abdusamad Saidov
- (Uzbekistan) Sayfiddin Sodikov
- (Venezuela) Eider Barrios
- (Venezuela) Diego Claut
- (Venezuela) Roman Davis
- (Venezuela) Dioner Fuentes
- (Venezuela) Marcos Maitán
- (Venezuela) John Mancilla
- (Venezuela) Juan Uribe
- (Zambia) Kelvin Chipelu
- (Zambia) Billy Daka
- (Zambia) Jonathan Kalimina
- (Zambia) Lukonde Mwale
- (Zambia) Felix Phiri
- (Zambia) James Sibeene
- (Zambia) Mapalo Simute

1 own goal

- (El Salvador) Andrew Reyes (against Germany)
- (Fiji) Ravuso Sukabula (against Argentina)
- (Indonesia) Putu Panji (against Brazil)
- (Mexico) Santiago López (against Switzerland)
- (New Caledonia) Steevy Andrew (against Morocco)
- (Paraguay) Aldo Sanabria (against Panama)
- (South Korea) Jung Hui-seop (against England)
- (Tunisia) Mazen Slama (against Austria)

== Marketing ==
=== Emblem ===
The official emblem was revealed on 12 May 2025.

=== Theme song ===
On 31 October 2025, FIFA revealed the official song titled "TMRW'S GOAT" (short for "Tomorrow's GOAT") sung by duo Nour from Egypt and Yarden from Nigeria.

=== Mascot ===
On 30 October 2025, a desert owl-shaped mascot named "Boma" was revealed. The name means the animal type in Arabic. Boma's personality is a tribute to Bora Milutinović. Boma represents experience, intelligence and the vision for the future.

== See also ==
- 2025 FIFA U-17 Women's World Cup
- 2025 FIFA U-20 World Cup

== Notes ==
1. There were eight pitches available plus the Khalifa International Stadium inside the Aspire Zone for a total of nine pitches for the tournament.
