= José Neto =

José Neto may refer to:

- José Neto (basketball) (born 1971), Brazilian basketball coach, former head coach of the Brazil national basketball team
- José Neto (musician), jazz fusion guitarist
- José Neto (footballer, born 1935) (1935–1999), Portuguese footballer who played for S.L. Benfica
- José Neto (footballer, born 2008), Portuguese football defender
- Jose Franca Neto (born 1955), Brazilian footballer who mostly played in the U.S.
