= Saulo Tejeda =

Mexican footballer (born 2009)

Personal information
- Full name: Saulo Tejeda Sentíes
- Date of birth: 1 May 2009 (age 17)
- Place of birth: Tehuacán, Mexico
- Height: 1.75 m (5 ft 9 in)
- Position: Winger

Team information
- Current team: Dinamo Zagreb

Youth career
- –2026: San Diego Surf
- 2026–: Dinamo Zagreb

International career^{‡}
Years	Team	Apps	(Gls)
2023	Mexico U15	3	(1)
2025	Mexico U16	2	(0)
2024–	Mexico U17	8	(1)
- ‡ National team caps and goals as of 21 April 2025

Saulo Tejeda Sentíes (born 1 May 2009) is a Mexican professional footballer who plays as a winger for Croatian Football League club Dinamo Zagreb.

== Club career ==
As a youth player, Tejeda joined the youth academy of American side San Diego Surf. Following his stint there, he joined the youth academy of Dinamo Zagreb in Croatia after almost joining the youth academy of Croatian outfit Lokomotiva where he played in the UEFA Youth League.

== International career ==
Tejeda is a Mexico youth international and has represented the country internationally at under-15, under-16 and under-17 level. Altogether, he made three appearances and scored one goal while playing for the Mexico national under-15 football team and two appearances and scored zero goals while playing for the Mexico national under-16 football team.

During February 2025, he played for the Mexico national under-17 football team for 2025 CONCACAF U-17 World Cup qualification. In 2026, he played for the Mexico national under-17 football team at the 2026 FIFA U-17 World Cup.

== Style of play ==
Tejeda plays as a winger. Mexican newspaper Excélsior wrote in 2026 that he "primarily plays as a right winger. His main strengths include his speed, ability to take on defenders, and involvement in the final third of the pitch".
