= Fabio Pandolfi =

Italian footballer (born 2008)

Personal information
- Date of birth: 23 February 2008 (age 18)
- Place of birth: Treviglio, Italy
- Height: 1.78 m (5 ft 10 in)
- Position: Midfielder

Team information
- Current team: Milan Futuro

Youth career
- AC Milan

Senior career*
Years	Team	Apps	(Gls)
2026–	Milan Futuro (res.)	10	(3)

International career^{‡}
2024	Italy U16	6	(0)
2024–2025	Italy U17	6	(1)
2025–	Italy U18	5	(0)
Medal record
Men's football
Representing Italy
FIFA U-17 World Cup
Third place	2025 Qatar
- * Club domestic league appearances and goals as of 23:55, 8 November 2026 (UTC) ‡ National team caps and goals as of 23:45, 12 October 2025 (UTC)

Fabio Pandolfi (born 23 May 2008) is an Italian professional footballer who plays as a midfielder for Serie D club Milan Futuro, the reserve team of Serie A club AC Milan. He is an Italian youth international.

== Club career ==
He was born in Treviglio, Italy, and started playing football at a young age, joining the youth academy of AC Milan aged 5. On 20 July 2025, Pandolfi signed his first professional contract with AC Milan, after eleven seasons progressing through the youth ranks, being projected for their reserve team Milan Futuro.

He was promoted from the Primavera to Milan Futuro during the late second half of the 2025–26 season, along with Simone Lontani and Filippo Scotti.

On 8 February 2026, Pandolfi was called up with Milan Futuro during the 1–0 home loss Serie D match against Virtus CiseranoBergamo, as an unused substitute however. The following month, on 15 March, he was called-up again during a 1–0 away win Serie D match against Oltrepò, but did not play.

On 2 September 2026, Pandolfi made his professional debut with Milan Futuro, starting and featuring full-time during the 2–1 away win Premier League International Cup group B match against the U21 squad of English Premier League club Everton. Four days later, he came off the bench for Milan Futuro, substituting Aurelien Guernier in the first half of a 4–3 home win Serie D match against Caldiero Terme on the league's opening match for the season, on September 6th. Fourteen days later, on September 20, Pandolfi scored his first professional goal, starting during a 2–1 away win Serie D match against Villa Valle, breaking the draw and scoring the second goal to secure Milan Futuro's win.

== International career ==
He is an Italy youth international, having featured with the under-16, under-17 and under-18 teams.

With the U17 side finished in third place at the 2025 FIFA U-17 World Cup.

== Career statistics ==
As of match played 8 November 2026

Appearances and goals by club, season and competition
Club	Season	League			Cup		Continental		Other		Total	
Club	Season	Division	Apps	Goals	Apps	Goals	Apps	Goals	Apps	Goals	Apps	Goals
Milan Futuro	2025–26	Serie D	0	0	—		—		—		0	0
Milan Futuro	2026–27	Serie D	10	3	0	0	—		1 (Note: Appearance in Premier League International Cup)	0	11	3
Milan Futuro	Total		10	3	0	0	—		1	0	11	3
Career total			10	3	0	0	0	0	1	0	11	3

== Style of play ==
Pandolfi plays as a midfielder. In late 2025, Sportitalia editor-in-chief Michele Criscitiello wrote about him as a "Modrić-like midfielder who used to be an attacking midfielder and now they’ve moved him back to regista", and described him as "very strong player, extremely intelligent, a strong player in front of the defence".

== Honours ==
Italy U17

- FIFA U-17 World Cup third place: 2025
