= João Aragão =

Portuguese footballer (born 2008)

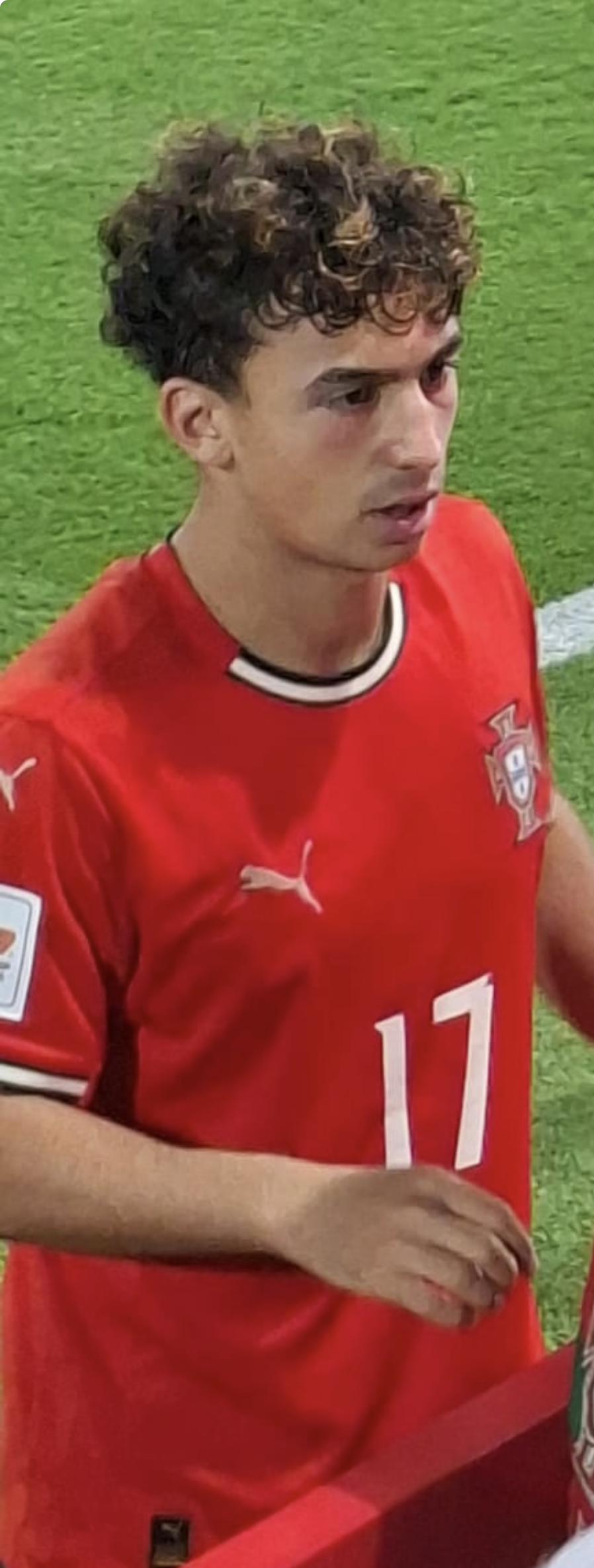
- Aragão at the U17 2025 World Cup

Personal information
- Full name: João Soares Aragão
- Date of birth: 24 March 2008 (age 18)
- Place of birth: Coimbra, Portugal
- Height: 1.70 m (5 ft 7 in)
- Position: Winger

Team information
- Current team: Braga
- Number: 72

Youth career
- 2014–2018: Académica de Coimbra
- 2018–2020: NS Ança
- 2020–2022: Feirense
- 2022–2025: Braga

Senior career*
Years	Team	Apps	(Gls)
2025–	Braga B	16	(0)
2025–	Braga	0	(0)

International career^{‡}
2022	Portugal U15	3	(0)
2023–2024	Portugal U16	7	(2)
2024–2025	Portugal U17	6	(0)
2025–	Portugal U18	4	(0)
Medal record
Men's football
Representing Portugal
FIFA U-17 World Cup
Winner	2025 Qatar
UEFA European Under-17 Championship
Winner	2025 Albania
- * Club domestic league appearances and goals as of 6 May 2026 ‡ National team caps and goals as of 13:25, 27 October 2025 (UTC)

João Soares Aragão (born 24 March 2008) is a Portuguese professional footballer who plays as a winger for Primeira Liga club Braga.

== Club career ==
Aragão is a product of the youth academies of the Portuguese clubs Académica de Coimbra, NS Ança, Feirense and Braga. On 2 August 2024, he signed his first professional contract with Braga until 2027. He made his senior and professional debut with Braga in a 2–0 UEFA Europa League win over Red Star Belgrade on 23 October 2025.

== International career ==
Aragão played for the Portugal U17s at the 2025 UEFA European Under-17 Championship, where they won the competition. Thereafter he proceeded to play during the 2025 FIFA U-17 World Cup hosted in Qatar where they also won the competition, achieving Portugal's first victory in the category and third overall world award.

== Honours ==
Portugal U17

- FIFA U-17 World Cup: 2025
- UEFA European Under-17 Championship: 2025
