= Harrison Miles =

English footballer (born 2008)

Personal information
- Full name: Harrison Frank Miles
- Date of birth: 28 July 2008 (age 18)
- Place of birth: Chichester, England
- Height: 5 ft 10 in (1.78 m)
- Position: Midfielder

Team information
- Current team: Manchester City

Youth career
- –2024: Southampton
- 2024–: Manchester City

International career^{‡}
| Years | Team | Apps | (Gls) |
| 2023 | England U15 | 4 | (1) |
| 2023–2024 | England U16 | 8 | (1) |
| 2024–2025 | England U17 | 9 | (1) |
| 2025– | England U18 | 10 | (0) |
- ‡ National team caps and goals as of 14:39, 3 June 2026 (UTC)

Harrison Frank Miles (born 28 July 2008) is an English professional footballer who plays as a midfielder for Manchester City.

== Club career ==
As a youth player, Miles joined the youth academy of Southampton. Following his stint there, he joined the youth academy of Premier League side Manchester City in 2024 and debuted for the club's under-21 team at the age of fifteen.

== International career ==
Miles is an England youth international. During November 2025, he played for England U17 at the 2025 FIFA U-17 World Cup. He scored a goal in a group stage victory over Egypt and started in their round of sixteen eliminaton against Austria.

== Style of play ==
Miles plays as a midfielder. American newspaper The New York Times wrote in 2025 that he "is a busy, technical player... [his] key strength was showcased in his ability to play forward and switch play".
