= Anísio Cabral =

Portuguese footballer (born 2008)

Personal information
- Full name: Anísio Cláudio Fernandes Reis Cabral
- Date of birth: 15 February 2008 (age 18)
- Place of birth: Lisbon, Portugal
- Height: 1.87 m (6 ft 2 in)
- Position: Centre-forward

Team information
- Current team: Benfica
- Number: 72

Youth career
- 2015–2016: Alta
- 2016–: Benfica

Senior career*
Years	Team	Apps	(Gls)
2026–	Benfica	6	(2)
2026–	Benfica B	7	(0)

International career^{‡}
2024	Portugal U16	8	(7)
2024–	Portugal U17	26	(16)
2025–	Portugal U18	6	(1)
Medal record
Men's football
Representing Portugal
FIFA U-17 World Cup
Winner	2025 Qatar
UEFA European Under-17 Championship
Winner	2025 Albania
- * Club domestic league appearances and goals as of 20 June 2026 ‡ National team caps and goals as of 00:07, 26 January 2026 (UTC)

Anísio Cláudio Fernandes Reis Cabral (born 15 February 2008) is a Portuguese professional footballer who plays as a centre-forward for Primeira Liga club Benfica.

== Club career ==
Born in Lisbon, Cabral began his football career in 2015 in the youth team Alta. The following year, he transferred to Benfica, where first distinguished himself in the youth teams with this football club, and in 2024, he signed his first professional contract with them.

On 25 January 2026, Cabral made his professional debut for Benfica, coming on as a substitute and scoring with his first touch in a 4–0 league victory against Estrela da Amadora at the Estádio da Luz.

== International career ==
Born to Bissau-Guinean parents, Cabral was eligible to represent Guinea-Bissau and Portugal at the international level.

Cabral was first called up to Portugal U17 team in September 2024. He was named to that squad for the 2025 UEFA European Under-17 Championship. Portugal reached the final of the competition after winning on penalties against Italy (after a 2–2 draw). The team then claimed the trophy by defeating France 3–0 in the final, with Cabral scoring the opening goal and then providing the assist in the next one.

Cabral was named in the squad for the 2025 FIFA U-17 World Cup. Portugal triumphed over some of the biggest teams from their respective continents, including Morocco, Belgium, Mexico, Brazil, and finally Austria in the final, winning the U-17 World Cup for the first time. Their prolific attack combined for 23 goals, just three shy of Nigeria's record set in 2013.

A goalscorer in the final and at several crucial moments throughout the tournament, Cabral finished as the second-highest scorer at the U-17 World Cup with seven goals, including the only goal in the final, just one behind Johannes Moser.

== Honours ==
Portugal U17

- FIFA U-17 World Cup: 2025
- UEFA European Under-17 Championship: 2025

Individual

- FIFA U-17 World Cup Silver Boot: 2025
