= Wassim Slama =

Footballer (born 2008)

Personal information
- Full name: Zakaria Wassim Slama
- Date of birth: 26 September 2008 (age 18)
- Place of birth: Villeneuve-Saint-Georges, France
- Height: 1.81 m (5 ft 11 in)
- Position: Midfielder

Team information
- Current team: Paris Saint-Germain

Youth career
- Paris Saint-Germain

International career^{‡}
Years	Team	Apps	(Gls)
2025–	Tunisia U17	2	(2)
- ‡ National team caps and goals as of 6 November 2025

Zakaria Wassim Slama (Arabic: وسيم سلامة; born 26 September 2008) is a footballer who plays as a midfielder for Paris Saint-Germain. Born in France, he is a Tunisia youth international.

== Club career ==
Slama played for Paris Saint-Germain's under-17s in the 2024–25 season, while also making UEFA Youth League appearances and appearing once on the bench in Ligue 1. He joined the club's under-19 side ahead of the 2025–26 season.

== International career ==
Slama is a Tunisia youth international. During November 2025, he played for the Tunisia under-17s at the 2025 FIFA U-17 World Cup.

== Style of play ==
Slama plays as a midfielder. African sports website Foot Africa wrote in 2025 that he "impresses with his technique and vision on the pitch".

== Personal life ==
Born in Villeneuve-Saint-Georges in the Île-de-France, Slama's family originally hails from Zarzis in Tunisia.

== Honours ==
Paris Saint-Germain U19

- Championnat National U19: 2024–25, 2025–26
