= Simone Lontani =

Italian footballer (born 2008)

Personal information
- Date of birth: 17 January 2008 (age 18)
- Place of birth: Cesena, Italy
- Height: 1.81 m (5 ft 11 in)
- Positions: Forward; attacking midfielder; winger

Team information
- Current team: Parma
- Number: 76

Youth career
- –2023: Cesena
- 2022–2023: → AC Milan (loan)
- 2023–2026: AC Milan

Senior career*
Years	Team	Apps	(Gls)
2025–2026	Milan Futuro (res.)	3	(0)
2026–	Parma	11	(3)

International career^{‡}
2022–2023	Italy U15	13	(5)
2023–2024	Italy U16	11	(2)
2024–2025	Italy U17	12	(1)
2025–	Italy U19	6	(2)
Medal record
Men's football
Representing Italy
FIFA U-17 World Cup
Third place	2025 Qatar
- * Club domestic league appearances and goals as of 23:45, 7 November 2026 (UTC) ‡ National team caps and goals as of 23:45, 11 November 2025 (UTC)

Simone Lontani (born 18 January 2008) is an Italian professional footballer who plays as a forward, attacking midfielder and winger for Serie A club Parma. He is an Italian youth international.

== Club career ==
=== AC Milan ===
Lontani is a youth product of his hometown club Cesena. Later joining the youth academy of Serie A side AC Milan in 2022, ahead of the 2022–23 season.

In early 2024, he signed his first professional contract with AC Milan, until 2026.

Lontani received his first call-up and made his professional debut with AC Milan's reserve team on 22 October 2025, substituting Diego Sia during a 2–1 away loss Serie D match against Breno. He made his second and third appearances with Milan Futuro during the second half of the 2025–26 season, on 14 February 2026, he substituted Levis Asanji at the second half of a 1–0 home win Serie D match against Breno, and lastly, eight days later on February 22, substituting Chaka Traorè at the second half of a 3–0 away win Serie D match against Caldiero Terme. He was promoted from the Primavera to Milan Futuro during the late second half of the 2025–26 season, along with teammates Fabio Pandolfi and Filippo Scotti.

During the end the 2025–26 season, clubs showed interest in recruiting him, including fellow Serie A club Parma, ahead of the 2026–27 season.

=== Parma ===
On 26 June 2026, Lontani signed with Parma on a contract until 2031, as a free agent.

He made his debut with the club and scored the two goals during a 2–0 home win first round Coppa Italia match against Catania, on 14 August 2026.

== International career ==
He is an Italy youth international, having featured with the under-15, under-16, under-17 and under-19 teams.

With the U17 side he finished in third place at the 2025 FIFA U-17 World Cup.

Lontani was one of the players who were called up with the Italy national team by head coach Roberto Mancini for the 2026–27 UEFA Nations League matches against France and Belgium on 12 and 15 November 2026, respectively.

== Career statistics ==
As of match played 2 November 2026

Appearances and goals by club, season and competition
Club	Season	League			Cup (Note: Includes Coppa Italia)		Continental		Other		Total	
Club	Season	Division	Apps	Goals	Apps	Goals	Apps	Goals	Apps	Goals	Apps	Goals
Milan Futuro	2025–26	Serie D	3	0	—		—		—		3	0
Milan Futuro	Total		3	0	—		—		—		3	0
Parma	2026–27	Serie A	10	3	1	2	—		0	0	11	5
Parma	Total		10	3	1	2	0	0	0	0	11	5
Career total			13	3	1	2	0	0	0	0	14	5

== Honours ==
Italy U17

- FIFA U-17 World Cup third place: 2025
