= Jaden Umeh =

Irish association football player (born 2008)

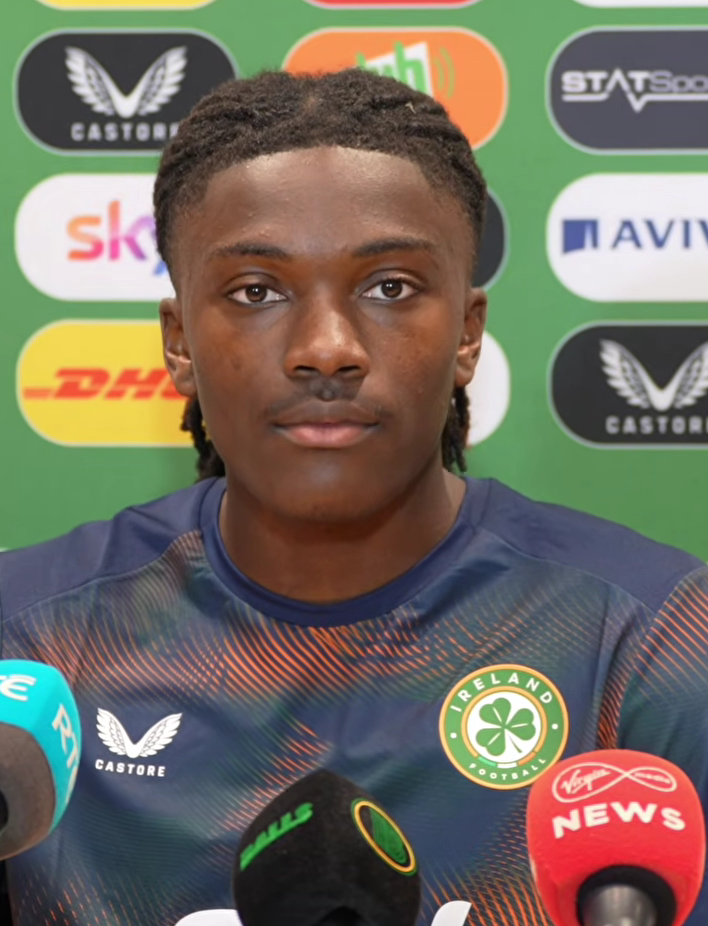
- Umeh in 2026

Personal information
- Full name: Jaden Chidi Umeh
- Date of birth: 18 March 2008 (age 18)
- Place of birth: Cork, Ireland, Ireland
- Height: 1.86 m (6 ft 1 in)
- Positions: Winger; forward

Team information
- Current team: Benfica U23
- Number: 57

Youth career
- –2023: Cork City
- 2024–: Benfica

Senior career*
Years	Team	Apps	(Gls)
2023–2024	Cork City	16	(2)

International career^{‡}
2022–2023	Republic of Ireland U15	13	(7)
2023–2024	Republic of Ireland U16	9	(2)
2023–2025	Republic of Ireland U17	25	(9)
2026–	Republic of Ireland U21	2	(0)
2026–	Republic of Ireland	2	(0)
- * Club domestic league appearances and goals as of 00:15, 11 February 2025 (UTC) ‡ National team caps and goals as of 02:57, 5 June 2026 (UTC)

Jaden Chidi Umeh (born 18 March 2008) is a Nigerian-Irish professional footballer who was born in Ireland and plays as a forward for the under-23 side of Portuguese Primeira Liga club Benfica. He also plays for the Republic of Ireland national team.

== Club career ==
=== Cork City ===
Umeh started his career at Irish club Cork City. He made his senior debut against Bohemians on 3 November 2023, becoming the youngest player ever to play for Cork at the age of just 15 years and 230 days. He later became Cork City's youngest ever goal-scorer in a 1–1 draw with Wexford, aged just 16 years and 14 days. He made 15 appearances and scoring two goals in the 2024 League of Ireland First Division.

=== Benfica ===
In August 2024, Umeh signed for Portuguese club Benfica. Cork received compensation from Benfica under FIFA compensation regulations, with further future benefits based on the player's progress. Having initially played for Benfica's youth teams, he was involved in pre-season with the first team in July 2026 under new manager Marco Silva, but picked up a thigh injury in a friendly against Flamengo that would keep him out of action for several months.

== International career ==
Born in Ireland, Umeh is of Nigerian descent. He has represented the Republic of Ireland at under-15, under-16 and under-17 level. He was named in the squad for the 2025 FIFA U-17 World Cup in Qatar in November 2025. After impressing at the U17 World Cup, Umeh received his first call up to the Republic of Ireland U21 squad in March 2026.

On 5 May 2026, Umeh received his first call up to the Republic of Ireland senior team for a friendly against Grenada in Murcia, Spain, but he wasn't released by Benfica since the game fell outside of the FIFA international window. He made his senior international debut on 28 May 2026, replacing Chiedozie Ogbene from the bench in a 1–0 win over Qatar at the Aviva Stadium. The following week, he made his first start in a 1–1 draw against Canada in Montreal.

== Personal life ==
He is from Mahon, Cork. He is the brother of professional footballer Franco Umeh who plays in England for Portsmouth.

== Career statistics ==
=== Club ===
As of matches played 25 May 2024

Appearances and goals by club, season and competition
Club	Season	League			National Cup (Note: Includes FAI Cup & Taça de Portugal)		League Cup (Note: Includes Taça da Liga)		Other		Total	
Club	Season	Division	Apps	Goals	Apps	Goals	Apps	Goals	Apps	Goals	Apps	Goals
Cork City	2023	LOI Premier Division	1	0	0	0	–		1 (Note: Appearance(s) in the Munster Senior Cup)	0	2	0
Cork City	2024	LOI First Division	15	2	0	0	–		1	0	16	2
Cork City	Total		16	2	0	0	–		2	0	18	2
Benfica	2024–25	Primeira Liga	0	0	0	0	0	0	0	0	0	0
Benfica	2025–26	Primeira Liga	0	0	0	0	0	0	0	0	0	0
Benfica	2026–27	Primeira Liga	0	0	0	0	0	0	0	0	0	0
Benfica	Total		0	0	0	0	0	0	0	0	0	0
Career total			16	2	0	0	0	0	2	0	18	2

=== International ===
As of match played on 5 June 2026

Appearances and goals by national team and year
National team	Year	Apps	Goals
Republic of Ireland
Republic of Ireland	2026	2	0
Total		2	0
