= Mohamed Zongo =

Burkinabe footballer (born 2010)

Personal information
- Date of birth: 26 November 2009 (age 16)
- Place of birth: Burkina Faso
- Height: 1.83 m (6 ft 0 in)
- Position: Midfielder

Team information
- Current team: Sporting Football Cascades

Youth career
- Sporting Football Cascades

International career^{‡}
Years	Team	Apps	(Gls)
2025–	Burkina Faso U17	7	(4)
2026-	Burkina Faso U20	4	(2)
2026	Burkina Faso	1	(-)
- ‡ National team caps and goals as of 21 November 2025

Mohamed Zongo (born 26 November 2009) is a Burkinabe professional footballer who plays as a midfielder for Sporting Football Cascades.

== Club career ==
As a youth player, Zongo joined the youth academy of Sporting Football Cascades.

== International career ==
Zongo is a Burkina Faso youth international. During November 2025, he played for the Burkina Faso national under-17 football team at the 2025 FIFA U-17 World Cup.

== Style of play ==
Zongo plays as a midfielder and is left-footed.
