= Filippo Scotti (footballer) =

Italian footballer (born 2006)

Personal information
- Date of birth: 11 November 2006 (age 19)
- Place of birth: Vizzolo Predabissi, Italy
- Positions: Winger; forward

Team information
- Current team: Savoia (on loan from Avellino)
- Number: 9

Youth career
- –2026: AC Milan

Senior career*
Years	Team	Apps	(Gls)
2024–2026	Milan Futuro (res.)	4	(0)
2026–	Avellino	0	(0)
2026–	→ Savoia (loan)	12	(2)

International career^{‡}
2021–2022	Italy U16	14	(8)
2022–2023	Italy U17	12	(3)
2023–2024	Italy U18	6	(2)
2024	Italy U19	2	(1)
- * Club domestic league appearances and goals as of 1 November 2026 ‡ National team caps and goals as of 23:45, 6 August 2024 (UTC)

Filippo Scotti (born 11 November 2006) is an Italian professional footballer who plays as a winger and forward for Serie C Group C club Savoia, on loan from Avellino. He is an Italian youth international.

== Club career ==
=== AC Milan ===
Born in Vizzolo Predabissi, Italy, Scotti is a youth product of Serie A side AC Milan, after his impressive performances during the 2023–24 UEFA Youth League, he signed his first professional contract in October 2023, until 2026.

He received his first call-up with the newly created reserve team Milan Futuro by the inaugural head coach Daniele Bonera, during the 2024–25 season on 10 August 2024, for the 3–0 away win Coppa Italia Serie C first round match against Lecco, as an unused substitute however. Scotti still managed to have some impressive performances with the Primavera squad (Campionato Primavera 1) during the 2024–25 season.

He made his professional debut with Milan Futuro relegated to the Serie D the following season, substituting Diego Sia and providing an assist during the 2–1 away win Serie D match against Varesina, on 7 December 2025. He was promoted from the under-19s to Milan Futuro during the late second half of the 2025–26 season, along with Fabio Pandolfi and Simone Lontani.

After the 2025–26 season concluded, his contract with AC Milan expired and after not signing a contract extension, several clubs showed interest in recruiting him for the upcoming season, including Serie B clubs Cesena and Südtirol, as well as Serie C clubs Reggiana and Pescara.

=== Avellino ===
On 29 July 2026, Scotti joined Serie B club Avellino as a free agent, and he signed a contract until 2029, ahead of the 2026–27 season.

==== Loan to Savoia ====
On 30 July 2026, one day after signing with Avellino, he joined recently Serie C promoted club Savoia, on a one-year loan.

== International career ==
He is an Italy youth international, having featured with the under-16, under-17, under-18 and under-19 teams.

== Career statistics ==
As of match played 23 August 2026

Appearances and goals by club, season and competition
Club	Season	League			Cup (Note: Includes Coppa Italia Serie C)		Continental		Other		Total	
Club	Season	Division	Apps	Goals	Apps	Goals	Apps	Goals	Apps	Goals	Apps	Goals
Milan Futuro	2024–25	Serie C	0	0	0	0	—		0	0	0	0
Milan Futuro	2025–26	Serie D	4	0	—		—		1 (Note: Appearance in Serie D play-offs)	0	5	0
Milan Futuro	Total		4	0	0	0	—		1	0	4	0
Savoia (loan)	2026–27	Serie C	1	0	1	0	—		0	0	2	0
Savoia (loan)	Total		1	0	1	0	—		1	0	2	0
Career total			5	0	1	0	0	0	1	0	6	0
