= Felipe Morais =

Brazilian footballer

Personal information
- Full name: Felipe de Morais Barbosa Penna dos Santos
- Date of birth: 29 August 2008 (age 18)
- Place of birth: Conselheiro Lafaiete, Brazil
- Position: Attacking midfielder

Team information
- Current team: Cruzeiro
- Number: 38

Youth career
- 2017: Mineiro EC
- 2017–2026: Cruzeiro

Senior career*
Years	Team	Apps	(Gls)
2026–	Cruzeiro	4	(1)

International career
2025–	Brazil U17	17	(2)
- * Club domestic league appearances and goals as of 14:06, 10 August 2026 (UTC)

Felipe de Morais Barbosa Penna dos Santos (born 29 August 2008), also known as Felipe Morais or Felipe de Morais, is a Brazilian professional footballer who plays as an attacking midfielder for Cruzeiro.

== Career ==
Originally from Conselheiro Lafaiete, Morais began playing for Mineiro EC, a club in the city. In 2017, after a match against Cruzeiro, he was signed by the team. The player is considered by Cruzeiro EC directors to be the most promising talent in their youth academy, and the Spanish publication AS has described him as "a spectacular player".

== International career ==
Morais was called up by coach Dudu Patetuci for the 2025 South American U-17 Championship and the 2025 FIFA U-17 World Cup. Morais stood out for his performance against Indonesia in his second match on the tournament.

== Honours ==
Brazil U17

- South American U-17 Championship: 2025
