= Santiago Cisneros =

Mexican footballer (born 2009)

Personal information
- Full name: Alberto Santiago Cisneros Andrade
- Date of birth: 11 August 2009 (age 17)
- Place of birth: Tijuana, Mexico
- Height: 1.72 m (5 ft 8 in)
- Positions: Midfielder; winger; forward

Team information
- Current team: León
- Number: 312

Youth career
- León

International career
Years	Team	Apps	(Gls)
2024–2025	Mexico U16	7	(2)
2026–	Mexico U17	4	(3)

Alberto Santiago Cisneros Andrade (born 11 August 2009) is a Mexican professional footballer who plays as a midfielder, winger or forward for Liga MX club León.

== Early life ==
Cisneros was born on 11 August 2009. Born in Tijuana, Mexico, to American parents. He holds a Mexican passport and American passport.

== Club career ==
As a youth player, Cisneros joined the youth academy of León at under-14 level. In 2025, he was promoted to the club's under-19 team.

One year later, he was promoted to their under-21 team. The same year, he trialed with Austrian side LASK.

== International career ==
Cisneros is a Mexico youth international and has represented the country internationally at under-16 and under-17 level and is eligible to represent the United States internationally.

Altogether, he made seven appearances and scored two goals while playing for the Mexico national under-16 football team. During February 2026, he played for the Mexico national under-17 football team for 2026 CONCACAF U-17 World Cup qualification.

== Style of play ==
Cisneros plays as a midfielder, winger or forward. English newspaper The Guardian wrote in 2026 that he "dictates the tempo in the final third of the field, breaking down low blocks with precise passing across both feet. Yet his true brilliance begins the moment he cuts inside with a shooting threat from long distance".
