= Johannes Moser (footballer) =

Austrian footballer (born 2008)

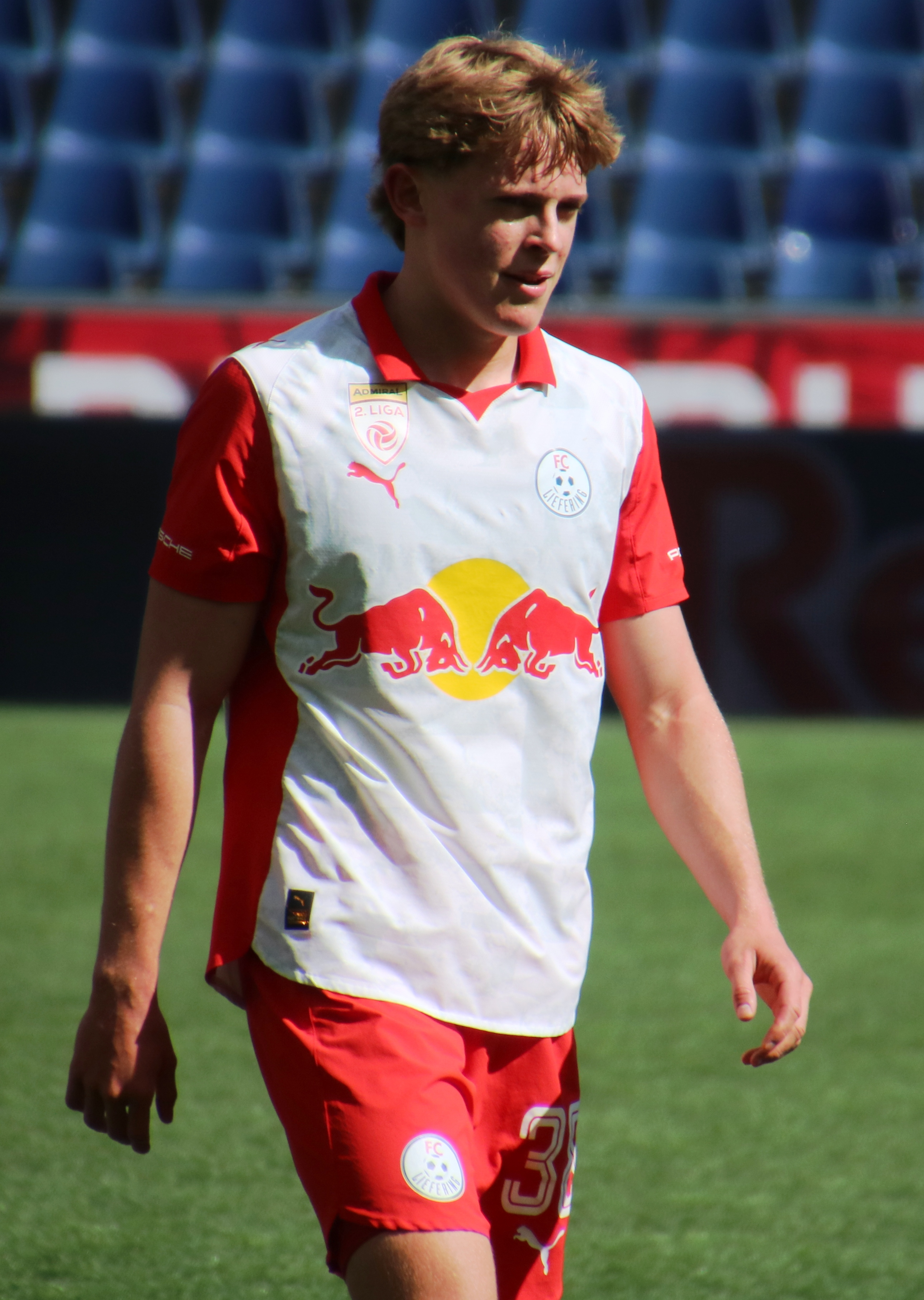
- Moser in 2026

Personal information
- Full name: Johannes Mathias Moser
- Date of birth: 16 January 2008 (age 18)
- Place of birth: Klagenfurt, Austria
- Height: 1.79 m (5 ft 10 in)
- Position: Attacking midfielder

Team information
- Current team: Red Bull Salzburg
- Number: 27

Youth career
- 2013–2019: SK Treibach
- 2019–2021: KAC 1909
- 2021–2025: Red Bull Salzburg

Senior career*
Years	Team	Apps	(Gls)
2025–2026	FC Liefering	22	(2)
2026–	Red Bull Salzburg	0	(0)

International career^{‡}
2022–2023	Austria U15	6	(0)
2023	Austria U16	4	(2)
2024–2025	Austria U17	18	(12)
Medal record
Men's football
Representing Austria
FIFA U-17 World Cup
Runner-up	2025 Qatar
- * Club domestic league appearances and goals as of 06:15, 6 May 2026 (UTC) ‡ National team caps and goals as of 27 November 2025

Johannes Mathias Moser (born 16 January 2008) is an Austrian professional footballer who plays as an attacking midfielder for Austrian Bundesliga club Red Bull Salzburg.

== Club career ==
Moser began his career at SK Treibach. He transferred to KAC 1909 for the 2019–20 season. For the 2021–22 season, he joined the Red Bull Salzburg academy, where he progressed through all age groups. At Salzburg, he participated in the 2024–25 UEFA Youth League. He scored a goal against Celtic and helped his team reach the semi-finals.

On 11 April 2025, Moser made his professional debut in the 2. Liga with Salzburg's reserve team FC Liefering, coming on as a substitute for Oliver Lukić in stoppage time against Kapfenberger SV.

On 23 January 2026, Moser signed a four-and-a-half-year contract with Red Bull Salzburg and initially remained at FC Liefering.

== International career ==
Moser first played for an Austrian youth national team in November 2022, starting with the Austria U15 team. In September 2024, he made his debut for the U-17 team against Finland. Moser was named as part of the Austria U-17 team that qualified for the 2025 FIFA U-17 World Cup. In the semi-final of the competition, he scored the only two goals of the match against Italy and his team advanced to the first final in its history.

== Honours ==
Austria U17

- FIFA U-17 World Cup runner-up: 2025

Individual

- FIFA U-17 World Cup Golden Boot: 2025
- FIFA U-17 World Cup Silver Ball: 2025
- FIFA U-17 World Cup Goal of the Tournament: 2025
