= Zeega =

Portuguese footballer (born 2008)

Personal information
- Full name: Martim Costa Guedes
- Date of birth: 5 November 2008 (age 17)
- Place of birth: Paços de Ferreira, Portugal
- Height: 1.78 m (5 ft 10 in)
- Position: Attacking midfielder

Team information
- Current team: Vitória Guimarães B
- Number: 50

Youth career
- –2018: Paços de Ferreira
- 2018–2025: Vitória Guimarães

Senior career*
| Years | Team | Apps | (Gls) |
| 2025– | Vitória Guimarães B | 5 | (0) |

International career^{‡}
| 2024 | Portugal U16 | 6 | (0) |
| 2024– | Portugal U17 | 22 | (3) |
| 2025– | Portugal U18 | 3 | (0) |
Medal record
Men's football
Representing Portugal
FIFA U-17 World Cup
| Winner | 2025 Qatar |
UEFA European Under-17 Championship
| Winner | 2025 Albania |
- * Club domestic league appearances and goals as of 14 September 2025 ‡ National team caps and goals as of 24 November 2025

Martim Costa Guedes (born 5 November 2008), commonly known as Zeega, is a Portuguese professional footballer who plays as an attacking midfielder for Vitória Guimarães B.

== Club career ==
Zeega began his career at the academy of Paços de Ferreira. In 2018, he transferred to Vitória Guimarães academy, where first distinguished himself in the youth teams with this football club, until he made his professional debut on 13 September 2025, in the Campeonato de Portugal with Vitória Guimarães B in a scoreless draw against Braga B.

== International career ==
Zeega was named to the Portugal U17 squad for the 2025 UEFA European Under-17 Championship. Portugal reached the final of the competition after winning on penalties against Italy (after a 2–2 draw). The team then claimed the trophy by defeating France 3–0 in the final.

In November 2025, Zeega was again included the largely unchanged U-17 squad that participated in the U-17 World Cup in Qatar. This time, he participated in all the matches, including the final, where Portugal defeated Austria 1–0. Zeega scored two goals during the tournament, against Japan and then Mexico.

== Honours ==
Portugal U17

- FIFA U-17 World Cup: 2025
- UEFA European Under-17 Championship: 2025
