= Mateus Mide =

Portuguese footballer (born 2008)

Personal information
- Full name: Mateus Souto Mide
- Date of birth: 10 May 2008 (age 18)
- Place of birth: Porto, Portugal
- Height: 1.74 m (5 ft 9 in)
- Position: Attacking midfielder

Team information
- Current team: Porto B
- Number: 89

Youth career
- 2012–2026: Porto

Senior career*
Years	Team	Apps	(Gls)
2026–	Porto B	16	(2)

International career^{‡}
2022	Portugal U15	3	(1)
2024	Portugal U16	2	(0)
2024–	Portugal U17	29	(9)
2025–	Portugal U18	6	(1)
Medal record
Men's football
Representing Portugal
FIFA U-17 World Cup
Winner	2025 Qatar
UEFA European Under-17 Championship
Winner	2025 Albania
- * Club domestic league appearances and goals as of 19 June 2026 ‡ National team caps and goals as of 23:03, 5 January 2026 (UTC)

Mateus Souto Mide (born 10 May 2008) is a Portuguese footballer who plays as an attacking midfielder for Liga Portugal 2 club Porto B.

== Early career ==
A native of Porto, Mide was formed by the FC Porto youth academy, where he joined at the age of 4.

On 5 January 2026, Mide made his professional debut for Porto B, coming on as a substitute in a 1–1 draw against Benfica B in the Liga Portugal 2.

== International career ==
Being half Brazilian and half Portuguese, Mide chose to represent Portugal in the international level. He featured for Portugal U17 in the 2025 UEFA European Under-17 Championship. He quickly emerged as one of the standout players in the tournament, which Portugal went on to win after beating Italy on penalties in the semi-final, before defeating France 3–0 in the final.

In the 2025 FIFA U-17 World Cup, Mide's outstanding performances contributed in Portugal's title win, and he was therefore given the Golden Ball for the best player of tournament.

== Personal life ==
Mide's father is Adriano Mide, a former footballer and futsal player from Brazil. Adriano Mide moved to Portugal in 2002, and remained there since.

== Honours ==
Portugal U17

- FIFA U-17 World Cup: 2025
- UEFA European Under-17 Championship: 2025

Individual

- FIFA U-17 World Cup Golden Ball: 2025
