= José Neto (footballer, born 2008) =

Portuguese footballer (born 2008)

Personal information
- Full name: José Pedro Formoso Neto
- Date of birth: 19 April 2008 (age 18)
- Place of birth: Aljustrel, Portugal
- Height: 1.84 m (6 ft 0 in)
- Position: Left-back

Team information
- Current team: Benfica
- Number: 62

Youth career
- –2017: Mineiro Aljustrelense
- 2017–2025: Benfica

Senior career*
Years	Team	Apps	(Gls)
2025–	Benfica B	13	(1)
2025–	Benfica	2	(0)

International career^{‡}
2024	Portugal U16	3	(0)
2024–	Portugal U17	15	(1)
2025–	Portugal U18	2	(0)
Medal record
Men's football
Representing Portugal
FIFA U-17 World Cup
Winner	2025 Qatar
UEFA European Under-17 Championship
Winner	2025 Albania
- * Club domestic league appearances and goals ‡ National team caps and goals as of 20 June 2026

José Pedro Formoso Neto (born 19 April 2008) is a Portuguese professional footballer who plays as a left-back for Benfica.

== Early life ==
Neto was born on 19 April 2008. Born in Aljustrel, Portugal, he is a native of the city.

== Club career ==
As a youth player, Neto joined the youth academy of Mineiro Aljustrelense. Following his stint there, he joined the youth academy of Benfica.

== International career ==
Neto is a Portugal youth international. During May and June 2025, he played for the Portugal national under-17 football team at the 2025 UEFA European Under-17 Championship.

== Style of play ==
Neto plays as a defender. English newspaper The Guardian wrote in 2025 that he "is a meticulous full-back, both defensively and in his attacking role".

== Honours ==
Portugal U17

- FIFA U-17 World Cup: 2025
- UEFA European Under-17 Championship: 2025
