= Jerónimo Gómez Mattar =

Argentine footballer (born 2008)

Jerónimo Gómez
Personal information
- Full name: Jerónimo Gómez Mattar
- Date of birth: 7 August 2008 (age 18)
- Place of birth: Rosario, Santa Fe, Argentina
- Height: 1.77 m (5 ft 10 in)
- Position: Midfielder

Team information
- Current team: Newell's Old Boys
- Number: 19

Youth career
- Newell's Old Boys

Senior career*
Years	Team	Apps	(Gls)
2025–	Newell's Old Boys	18	(0)

International career^{‡}
2025	Argentina U15	5	(0)
2024	Argentina U16	3	(3)
2025–	Argentina U17	6	(0)
- * Club domestic league appearances and goals as of 17:29, 8 May 2026 (UTC) ‡ National team caps and goals as of 13 July 2025

Jerónimo Gómez Mattar (born 7 August 2008) is an Argentine footballer who plays as a midfielder for Primera División club Newell's Old Boys.

== Club career ==
Born and raised in Rosario in the Santa Fe Province of Argentina, Gómez Mattar started his career in Newell's Old Boys football academy.

He signed his first professional contract with the club in September 2024. On 13 July 2025 he made his first team debut in Primera División match against Independiente Rivadavia.

== International career ==
Jerónimo Gómez Mattar has represented the Argentina national U15, U16 and U17 teams.

== Personal life ==
His brothers, Joaquín and Julián, are both footballers.
