= 2025 FIFA U-17 World Cup squads =

List of all the national team squads that participated in the 2025 FIFA U-17 World Cup

The following is a list of all the national team squads that participated in the 2025 FIFA U-17 World Cup.

Each team had to name a squad of 21 players (three of whom had to be goalkeepers) by 24 October 2025. All players of its representative team had to have been born on or after 1 January 2008. The age listed for each player is as of 3 November 2025, the first day of the tournament. Those marked in bold had been capped with the senior national team.

== Group A ==
=== Bolivia ===
The final 21-player squad was announced on 24 October 2025.

Head coach: (Argentina) Jorge Perrotta

No.	Pos.	Player	Date of birth (age)	Club
1	GK	Gerónimo Govea	10 April 2008 (aged 17)	(Uruguayan Football Association) Montevideo Wanderers
2	DF	Kenyhiro Estrada	24 October 2008 (aged 17)	(Bolivian Football Federation) Argentinos Juniors
3	DF	Fernando Mena	22 September 2008 (aged 17)	(Bolivian Football Federation) Bolívar
4	DF	Julio Lazarte	19 April 2008 (aged 17)	(Bolivian Football Federation) Universitario de Vinto
5	DF	Matías Espinoza	25 June 2008 (aged 17)	(Bolivian Football Federation) Bolívar
6	MF	Jhosep Michel	13 September 2008 (aged 17)	(Bolivian Football Federation) Aurora
7	FW	Alejandro Camacho	24 July 2008 (aged 17)	(Bolivian Football Federation) Always Ready
8	MF	Luis Sabja	9 February 2008 (aged 17)	(Bolivian Football Federation) Bolívar
9	FW	Jairo Saldías	7 June 2008 (aged 17)	(Bolivian Football Federation) Virginia Gol
10	MF	Jesús Maraude	2 February 2008 (aged 17)	(Bolivian Football Federation) Always Ready
11	MF	Santos García	22 April 2008 (aged 17)	(Bolivian Football Federation) Bolívar
12	GK	Adrien Philippin	15 January 2009 (aged 16)	(Swiss Football Association) Servette
13	DF	Matías Cuéllar	22 May 2009 (aged 16)	(Bolivian Football Federation) Always Ready
14	DF	Lysander Ureña	13 January 2009 (aged 16)	(Brazilian Football Confederation) São Paulo
15	DF	Tobías Zurita	18 October 2008 (aged 17)	(Argentine Football Association) Platense
16	MF	Bladimir Escalante	19 November 2008 (aged 16)	(Bolivian Football Federation) Blooming
17	MF	Bruno Núñez	24 January 2009 (aged 16)	(Bolivian Football Federation) Máquina Celeste
18	DF	José Ojeda	20 November 2008 (aged 16)	(Bolivian Football Federation) Always Ready
19	FW	Nabil Nacif	19 September 2009 (aged 16)	(Bolivian Football Federation) JMP Soccer School
20	DF	Ian Rodríguez	22 January 2009 (aged 16)	(Bolivian Football Federation) Jorge Wilstermann
21	GK	Carlos Borda	11 March 2009 (aged 16)	(Argentine Football Association) Atlético Tucumán

=== Italy ===
The final 21-player squad was announced on 21 October 2025.

Head coach: Massimiliano Favo

No.	Pos.	Player	Date of birth (age)	Club
1	GK	Francesco Cereser	5 January 2008 (aged 17)	(Italian Football Federation) Torino
2	DF	Dauda Iddrisa	8 January 2008 (aged 17)	(The Football Association) West Bromwich Albion
3	DF	Jean Mambuku	8 July 2008 (aged 17)	(French Football Federation) Reims
4	MF	Vincenzo Prisco	7 August 2008 (aged 17)	(Italian Football Federation) Napoli
5	DF	Leonardo Bovio	4 February 2008 (aged 17)	(Italian Football Federation) Inter Milan
6	DF	Luca Reggiani	9 January 2008 (aged 17)	(German Football Association) Borussia Dortmund
7	MF	Andrea Luongo	16 February 2008 (aged 17)	(Italian Football Federation) Torino
8	MF	Alessio Baralla	5 February 2008 (aged 17)	(Italian Football Federation) Empoli
9	FW	Thomas Campaniello	29 February 2008 (aged 17)	(Italian Football Federation) Empoli
10	FW	Samuele Inácio	2 April 2008 (aged 17)	(German Football Association) Borussia Dortmund
11	FW	Destiny Elimoghale	23 April 2009 (aged 16)	(Italian Football Federation) Juventus
12	GK	Alessandro Longoni	31 January 2008 (aged 17)	(Italian Football Federation) Milan
13	DF	David Marini	4 March 2008 (aged 17)	(Italian Football Federation) Cesena
14	MF	Fabio Pandolfi	24 May 2008 (aged 17)	(Italian Football Federation) Milan
15	DF	Cristiano De Paoli	27 January 2008 (aged 17)	(Italian Football Federation) Como
16	DF	Benit Borasio	20 January 2008 (aged 17)	(Italian Football Federation) Juventus
17	MF	Valerio Maccaroni	3 June 2008 (aged 17)	(Italian Football Federation) Roma
18	MF	Federico Steffanoni	4 September 2008 (aged 17)	(Italian Football Federation) Atalanta
19	FW	Antonio Arena	10 February 2009 (aged 16)	(Italian Football Federation) Roma
20	FW	Simone Lontani	18 January 2008 (aged 17)	(Italian Football Federation) Milan
21	GK	Sebastiano Nava	19 May 2008 (aged 17)	(Italian Football Federation) Juventus

=== Qatar ===
The final 21-player squad was announced on 27 October 2025, days after FIFA released the squad list.

Head coach: (Spain) Álvaro Mejía

No.	Pos.	Player	Date of birth (age)	Club
1	GK	Ahmed Aboueita	4 January 2008 (aged 17)	(Qatar Football Association) Al-Arabi
2	DF	Seif Hassanein	20 October 2008 (aged 17)	(Qatar Football Association) Al-Rayyan
3	DF	Sultan Al-Abdulrahman	8 February 2008 (aged 17)	(Qatar Football Association) Al-Sadd
4	DF	Al-Shaik Ndaw	31 January 2008 (aged 17)	(Qatar Football Association) Al-Sadd
5	DF	Karam Malak	7 May 2008 (aged 17)	(Qatar Football Association) Al-Sadd
6	MF	Adam Friakh	10 August 2008 (aged 17)	(Qatar Football Association) Al-Duhail
7	FW	Eissa Waleed	20 August 2008 (aged 17)	(Qatar Football Association) Al-Gharafa
8	MF	Malik Hassan	10 January 2008 (aged 17)	(Qatar Football Association) Al-Duhail
9	FW	Zaid Faisal Ktit	8 April 2008 (aged 17)	(Qatar Football Association) Al-Gharafa
10	FW	Mohannad Babli	20 June 2008 (aged 17)	(Qatar Football Association) Al-Duhail
11	FW	Tameem Al-Qadi	19 May 2008 (aged 17)	(Qatar Football Association) Al-Sadd
12	GK	Abdelrahman Zahab	2 January 2008 (aged 17)	(Qatar Football Association) Al-Rayyan
13	DF	Saoud Al-Hamad	3 February 2008 (aged 17)	(Qatar Football Association) Al-Duhail
14	MF	Omar Al-Marzouqi	8 February 2008 (aged 17)	(Qatar Football Association) Al-Sadd
15	MF	Mohamed Akram	14 December 2008 (aged 16)	(Qatar Football Association) Al-Duhail
16	DF	Abdelaziz El Hamaida	5 June 2008 (aged 17)	(Qatar Football Association) Al-Ahli
17	FW	Yazan Mohamed	16 October 2008 (aged 17)	(Qatar Football Association) Al-Duhail
18	DF	Mostafa Ahmed	22 November 2008 (aged 16)	(Qatar Football Association) Al-Arabi
19	MF	Mohammed Abdelrahman	15 March 2008 (aged 17)	(Qatar Football Association) Al-Khor
20	MF	Faissal Irahbine	16 March 2008 (aged 17)	(Qatar Football Association) Al-Sadd
21	GK	Khaled Choukri	14 April 2008 (aged 17)	(Qatar Football Association) Qatar SC

=== South Africa ===
The final 21-player squad was announced on 3 November 2025, days after FIFA released the squad list.

Head coach: Vela Khumalo

No.	Pos.	Player	Date of birth (age)	Club
1	GK	Lwandiso Radebe	25 March 2009 (aged 16)	(South African Football Association) SuperSport United
2	DF	Sive Pama	21 May 2008 (aged 17)	(South African Football Association) Cape Town City
3	DF	Lunje Noqobo	16 March 2008 (aged 17)	(South African Football Association) Kaizer Chiefs
4	DF	Liam Marithinus	27 February 2008 (aged 17)	(South African Football Association) Mamelodi Sundowns
5	FW	Luke Hendricks	23 March 2008 (aged 17)	(South African Football Association) Ubuntu Cape Town
6	MF	Kamohelo Maraletse	21 September 2008 (aged 17)	(South African Football Association) Mamelodi Sundowns
7	FW	Selwyn Stevens	15 February 2008 (aged 17)	(South African Football Association) Mamelodi Sundowns
8	MF	Teboho Mlangeni	19 January 2008 (aged 17)	(South African Football Association) Kaizer Chiefs
9	FW	Shaun Els	11 May 2008 (aged 17)	(South African Football Association) Kaizer Chiefs
10	FW	Emile Witbooi	29 August 2008 (aged 17)	(South African Football Association) Cape Town City
11	DF	Alwande Booysen	6 May 2008 (aged 17)	(South African Football Association) Lamontville Golden Arrows
12	FW	Tumi Mothapo-Bowes	15 May 2008 (aged 17)	(South African Football Association) Orlando Pirates
13	DF	Omphemetse Sekgoto	11 March 2010 (aged 15)	(South African Football Association) Mamelodi Sundowns
14	DF	Abulele Dlekedla	15 July 2008 (aged 17)	(South African Football Association) Cape Town City
15	FW	Neo Bohloko	1 April 2008 (aged 17)	(South African Football Association) Kaizer Chiefs
16	GK	Keabetswe Morake	19 January 2009 (aged 16)	(South African Football Association) Kaizer Chiefs
17	MF	Joshua Taylor	28 July 2008 (aged 17)	(South African Football Association) Cape Town City
18	FW	Will Henson	3 April 2008 (aged 17)	(South African Football Association) SuperSport United
19	FW	Lebo Dhlamini	11 April 2008 (aged 17)	(South African Football Association) Kaizer Chiefs
20	GK	Sello Mokhobo	3 January 2008 (aged 17)	(South African Football Association) Virginia Sports Academy
21	FW	Lebogang Mswane	21 March 2008 (aged 17)	(South African Football Association) Mamelodi Sundowns

== Group B ==
=== Japan ===
The final 21-player squad was announced on 17 October 2025. On 22 October 2025, Ryota Seo withdrew from the squad due to an injury and was replaced by Daichi Tani. On 22 October 2025, Daichi Tani withdrew from the squad due to an injury and was replaced by Maki Kitahara.

Head coach: Nozomi Hiroyama

No.	Pos.	Player	Date of birth (age)	Club
1	GK	Shuji Muramatsu	8 June 2008 (aged 17)	(United States Soccer Federation) Los Angeles FC
2	DF	Asuto Fujita	22 November 2008 (aged 16)	(Japan Football Association) Kawasaki Frontale
3	DF	Yoshitaka Tanaka	5 April 2008 (aged 17)	(Japan Football Association) Urawa Red Diamonds
4	DF	Shota Fujii	11 August 2008 (aged 17)	(Japan Football Association) Yokohama F. Marinos
5	DF	Anthony Motosuna	10 March 2009 (aged 16)	(Japan Football Association) Kashima Antlers
6	MF	Rento Noguchi	20 April 2008 (aged 17)	(Japan Football Association) Sanfrecce Hiroshima
7	MF	Kaiji Chonan	7 April 2009 (aged 16)	(Japan Football Association) Kashiwa Reysol
8	MF	Shimon Kobayashi	23 January 2008 (aged 17)	(Japan Football Association) Sanfrecce Hiroshima
9	FW	Maki Kitahara	7 July 2009 (aged 16)	(Japan Football Association) FC Tokyo
10	FW	Minato Yoshida	15 July 2008 (aged 17)	(Japan Football Association) Kashima Antlers
11	FW	Hiroto Asada	16 January 2008 (aged 17)	(Japan Football Association) Yokohama F. Marinos
12	GK	Hiroto Matsuura	21 September 2008 (aged 17)	(Japan Football Association) Albirex Niigata
13	MF	Daigo Hirashima	17 June 2008 (aged 17)	(Japan Football Association) Kashima Antlers
14	MF	Daizen Kawamoto	23 January 2008 (aged 17)	(Japan Football Association) Kashiwa Reysol
15	MF	Makoto Himeno	12 August 2008 (aged 17)	(Japan Football Association) JEF United
16	DF	Simon Yu Mendy	29 November 2008 (aged 16)	(Japan Football Association) RKU Kashiwa High School
17	DF	Futa Takeno	4 August 2008 (aged 17)	(Japan Football Association) RKU Kashiwa High School
18	FW	Jelani McGhee	24 December 2008 (aged 16)	(Japan Football Association) FC Ryukyu
19	MF	Takeshi Wada	5 June 2009 (aged 16)	(Japan Football Association) Urawa Red Diamonds
20	MF	Taiga Seguchi	10 January 2008 (aged 17)	(Japan Football Association) Vissel Kobe
21	GK	Ryota Hirano	17 February 2008 (aged 17)	(Japan Football Association) Oita Trinita

=== Morocco ===
The final 21-player squad was announced on 20 October 2025. On 25 October 2025, Yassine Badaoui withdrew from the squad due to an injury and was replaced by Gibril Bayoumi. On 1 November 2025, Nassim El Massoudi and Ilies Belmokhtar withdrew from the squad due to their respective injuries and were replaced by Bilal Soukrat and Ahmed Mouhoub.

Head coach: Nabil Baha

No.	Pos.	Player	Date of birth (age)	Club
1	GK	Chouaib Bellaarouch	10 February 2008 (aged 17)	(Royal Moroccan Football Federation) FUS Rabat
2	DF	Hamza Bouhaddi	7 October 2008 (aged 17)	(Royal Moroccan Football Federation) FUS Rabat
3	DF	Ilyas El Arbaoui	4 March 2008 (aged 17)	(Royal Spanish Football Federation) Athletic Bilbao
4	DF	Joseph Bellahsen	28 December 2008 (aged 16)	(German Football Association) Borussia Mönchengladbach
5	DF	Bilal Soukrat	24 March 2008 (aged 17)	(Royal Moroccan Football Federation) RS Berkane
6	MF	Elyes Saïdi	15 December 2008 (aged 16)	(French Football Federation) Auxerre
7	FW	Yones El Bayadi	1 February 2008 (aged 17)	(Royal Moroccan Football Federation) RS Berkane
8	MF	Abdellah Ouazane	15 January 2009 (aged 16)	(Royal Dutch Football Association) Ajax
9	FW	Ziyad Baha	10 August 2009 (aged 16)	(Royal Spanish Football Federation) Calavera
10	FW	Wassim Dardake	12 February 2008 (aged 17)	(French Football Federation) Toulouse
11	MF	Ahmed Mouhoub	4 January 2008 (aged 17)	(Royal Moroccan Football Federation) FUS Rabat
12	GK	Gibril Bayoumi	21 February 2008 (aged 17)	(French Football Federation) Amiens
13	DF	Driss Aït Cheikh	17 July 2008 (aged 17)	(Royal Moroccan Football Federation) Chippo
14	MF	Oualid Ibn Salah	5 November 2009 (aged 15)	(Royal Moroccan Football Federation) FUS Rabat
15	DF	Ilyas Hidaoui	13 April 2008 (aged 17)	(Royal Moroccan Football Federation) FUS Rabat
16	GK	Soufiane El Idrissi	22 February 2008 (aged 17)	(Royal Moroccan Football Federation) FUS Rabat
17	DF	Moncef Zekri	20 September 2008 (aged 17)	(Royal Belgian Football Association) Mechelen
18	FW	Zakari El Khalfioui	27 February 2008 (aged 17)	(French Football Federation) Toulouse
19	FW	Nahël Haddan	14 December 2008 (aged 16)	(French Football Federation) Monaco
20	FW	Ismail El Aoud	28 July 2009 (aged 16)	(Royal Spanish Football Federation) Valencia
21	FW	Abdelali Daoudi	13 December 2008 (aged 16)	(Royal Moroccan Football Federation) FUS Rabat

=== New Caledonia ===
The final 21-player squad was announced on 14 October 2025.

Head coach: (France) Léonardo Lopez

No.	Pos.	Player	Date of birth (age)	Club
1	GK	Sylvain Ipeze	20 May 2009 (aged 16)	(New Caledonian Football Federation) Lössi
2	MF	Yoël-Henry Attawa	12 March 2009 (aged 16)	(French Football Federation) Bastia
3	MF	Darryl Hmaloko	9 October 2009 (aged 16)	(New Caledonian Football Federation) Lössi
4	DF	Fabrice Iopue	3 March 2008 (aged 17)	(New Caledonian Football Federation) Magenta
5	DF	Yvrick Hmae	29 December 2008 (aged 16)	(New Caledonian Football Federation) Gaïca
6	MF	Maurice Katrawa	10 January 2008 (aged 17)	(New Caledonian Football Federation) Lössi
7	MF	Jean Canehmez	29 January 2008 (aged 17)	(New Caledonian Football Federation) Gaïca
8	DF	Edhgy Bearune	28 July 2008 (aged 17)	(New Caledonian Football Federation) Magenta
9	FW	Wesley Bouaoui	2 January 2008 (aged 17)	(New Caledonian Football Federation) Hienghène Sport
10	FW	Ezekiel Wamowe	27 May 2008 (aged 17)	(New Caledonian Football Federation) Lössi
11	FW	Baptiste Kutran	6 February 2008 (aged 17)	(French Football Federation) Stade Bordelais
12	DF	Typhan Dreuko	24 March 2009 (aged 16)	(New Caledonian Football Federation) Lössi
13	MF	Malik Padome	20 April 2008 (aged 17)	(New Caledonian Football Federation) Magenta
14	DF	André Menango	17 January 2009 (aged 16)	(New Caledonian Football Federation) Magenta
15	DF	Victor Luepak	7 January 2008 (aged 17)	(New Caledonian Football Federation) Lössi
16	GK	Kaié Hmeun	29 April 2008 (aged 17)	(New Caledonian Football Federation) Magenta
17	FW	Henrick Wassingalu	29 February 2008 (aged 17)	(New Caledonian Football Federation) Païta
18	FW	Alexis Ijelipa	24 May 2008 (aged 17)	(New Caledonian Football Federation) Gaïca
19	MF	Laurent-Jean Ihmeling	31 January 2008 (aged 17)	(New Caledonian Football Federation) Wetr
20	MF	Steevy Andrew	18 January 2010 (aged 15)	(New Caledonian Football Federation) Païta
21	GK	Nicolas Kutran	6 February 2008 (aged 17)	(French Football Federation) Stade Bordelais

=== Portugal ===
The final 21-player squad was announced on 29 October 2025, days after FIFA released the squad list.

Head coach: Bino

No.	Pos.	Player	Date of birth (age)	Club
1	GK	Romário Cunha	21 March 2008 (aged 17)	(Portuguese Football Federation) Braga
2	DF	Daniel Banjaqui	24 March 2008 (aged 17)	(Portuguese Football Federation) Benfica
3	DF	Martim Chelmik	13 June 2008 (aged 17)	(Portuguese Football Federation) Porto
4	DF	Mauro Furtado	30 July 2008 (aged 17)	(Portuguese Football Federation) Benfica
5	DF	José Neto	19 April 2008 (aged 17)	(Portuguese Football Federation) Benfica
6	MF	Rafael Quintas	8 March 2008 (aged 17)	(Portuguese Football Federation) Benfica
7	FW	Duarte Cunha	25 January 2008 (aged 17)	(Portuguese Football Federation) Porto
8	MF	Miguel Figueiredo	2 August 2008 (aged 17)	(Portuguese Football Federation) Benfica
9	FW	Anísio Cabral	15 February 2008 (aged 17)	(Portuguese Football Federation) Benfica
10	FW	Mateus Mide	10 May 2008 (aged 17)	(Portuguese Football Federation) Porto
11	FW	Stevan Manuel	11 June 2008 (aged 17)	(Portuguese Football Federation) Benfica
12	GK	Alexandre Tverdohlebov	16 January 2008 (aged 17)	(Portuguese Football Federation) Sporting CP
13	DF	Gabriel Dbouk	6 February 2008 (aged 17)	(Portuguese Football Federation) Braga
14	DF	Ricardo Neto	26 August 2008 (aged 17)	(Portuguese Football Federation) Benfica
15	DF	Yoan Pereira	8 April 2008 (aged 17)	(Portuguese Football Federation) Porto
16	MF	Santiago Verdi	5 May 2008 (aged 17)	(Portuguese Football Federation) Vitória de Guimarães
17	FW	João Aragão	24 March 2008 (aged 17)	(Portuguese Football Federation) Braga
18	MF	Bernardo Lima	26 March 2008 (aged 17)	(Portuguese Football Federation) Porto
19	FW	Tomás Soares	19 January 2008 (aged 17)	(Portuguese Football Federation) Benfica
20	MF	Zeega	5 November 2008 (aged 16)	(Portuguese Football Federation) Vitória de Guimarães
21	GK	David Rodrigues	27 October 2008 (aged 17)	(Portuguese Football Federation) Braga

== Group C ==
=== Costa Rica ===
The final 21-player squad was announced on 22 October 2025.

Head coach: Rándall Row

No.	Pos.	Player	Date of birth (age)	Club
1	GK	Ian O'rourke	9 May 2008 (aged 17)	(Costa Rican Football Federation) Saprissa
2	DF	Yerlan Sosa	6 April 2008 (aged 17)	(Costa Rican Football Federation) Alajuelense
3	DF	Thiago Cordero	20 June 2009 (aged 16)	(Costa Rican Football Federation) Saprissa
4	DF	Brayan Calderón	28 February 2009 (aged 16)	(Costa Rican Football Federation) Alajuelense
5	DF	Adrián Espinoza	28 April 2009 (aged 16)	(Costa Rican Football Federation) Alajuelense
6	MF	Ernesto Umaña	20 February 2008 (aged 17)	(Costa Rican Football Federation) Alajuelense
7	FW	Isaac Badilla	18 June 2008 (aged 17)	(Costa Rican Football Federation) Alajuelense
8	MF	Adriel Pérez	7 March 2008 (aged 17)	(Costa Rican Football Federation) Alajuelense
9	FW	Ethan Barley	18 April 2009 (aged 16)	(Costa Rican Football Federation) Alajuelense
10	FW	Gabriel Sibaja	19 November 2008 (aged 16)	(Costa Rican Football Federation) Saprissa
11	FW	Marcos Brown	14 November 2008 (aged 16)	(Costa Rican Football Federation) Alajuelense
12	MF	Nick Bennette	4 September 2008 (aged 17)	(Costa Rican Football Federation) Herediano
13	GK	Marshall Alfaro	10 November 2008 (aged 16)	(Costa Rican Football Federation) Herediano
14	DF	William Marchena	14 January 2008 (aged 17)	(Costa Rican Football Federation) Alajuelense
15	MF	Fabricio Urbina	12 June 2009 (aged 16)	(Costa Rican Football Federation) Saprissa
16	FW	Kaden Farrier	21 December 2008 (aged 16)	(Costa Rican Football Federation) Sporting
17	DF	Mathew Arias	28 February 2008 (aged 17)	(Costa Rican Football Federation) Carmelita
18	GK	Jafeth López	13 March 2008 (aged 17)	(Costa Rican Football Federation) Saprissa
19	FW	Jeremy Alemán	9 April 2008 (aged 17)	(Costa Rican Football Federation) San Carlos
20	MF	Santiago Vargas	15 July 2008 (aged 17)	(Costa Rican Football Federation) Herediano
21	FW	Saúl Chavarría	1 April 2008 (aged 17)	(Costa Rican Football Federation) Cartaginés

=== Croatia ===
The final 21-player squad was announced on 20 October 2025.

Head coach: Marijan Budimir

No.	Pos.	Player	Date of birth (age)	Club
1	GK	Matej Grahovac	26 March 2008 (aged 17)	(Croatian Football Federation) Osijek
2	MF	Petar Zvonimir Kostelac	17 March 2008 (aged 17)	(Croatian Football Federation) Lokomotiva
3	DF	Leon Jakirović	16 January 2008 (aged 17)	(Croatian Football Federation) Dinamo Zagreb
4	MF	Raul Kumar	6 February 2008 (aged 17)	(Croatian Football Federation) Istra 1961
5	DF	Karlo Pajsar	7 March 2008 (aged 17)	(Italian Football Federation) Parma
6	MF	Roko Vojvodić	21 February 2008 (aged 17)	(Croatian Football Federation) Hajduk Split
7	DF	Krešimir Radoš	14 January 2008 (aged 17)	(Croatian Football Federation) Dinamo Zagreb
8	MF	Pavle Smiljanić	8 May 2008 (aged 17)	(Croatian Football Federation) Lokomotiva
9	FW	Tino Kusanović	8 March 2008 (aged 17)	(German Football Association) 1. FC Nürnberg
10	MF	Niko Horvat	15 July 2008 (aged 17)	(German Football Association) Borussia Mönchengladbach
11	MF	Patrik Horvat	10 May 2008 (aged 17)	(Croatian Football Federation) Dinamo Zagreb
12	GK	Petar Nemet	15 July 2008 (aged 17)	(Croatian Football Federation) Istra 1961
13	DF	Mateo Čupić	4 May 2008 (aged 17)	(Croatian Football Federation) Hajduk Split
14	MF	Duje Slišković	5 August 2008 (aged 17)	(German Football Association) Union Berlin
15	FW	Lukas Murica	7 August 2008 (aged 17)	(Croatian Football Federation) Rijeka
16	DF	Nikola Radnić	10 June 2008 (aged 17)	(Croatian Football Federation) Dinamo Zagreb
17	DF	Andrija Burcar	19 January 2008 (aged 17)	(Italian Football Federation) Parma
18	MF	Jona Benkotić	20 March 2009 (aged 16)	(Croatian Football Federation) Dinamo Zagreb
19	FW	Ivan Križić	10 April 2008 (aged 17)	(German Football Association) Hertha BSC
20	FW	Gabrijel Šivalec	5 May 2008 (aged 17)	(Croatian Football Federation) Slaven Belupo
21	GK	Vito Kovač	2 April 2008 (aged 17)	(Croatian Football Federation) Rijeka

=== Senegal ===
The final 21-player squad was announced on 27 October 2025.

Head coach: Papa Ibrahima Faye

No.	Pos.	Player	Date of birth (age)	Club
1	GK	Birame Faye	31 May 2008 (aged 17)	(Senegalese Football Federation) SPES
2	DF	Lamine Mbengue	7 August 2009 (aged 16)	(Senegalese Football Federation) Génération Foot
3	DF	Talla Ndiaye	6 January 2008 (aged 17)	(Senegalese Football Federation) Amitié
4	DF	El Hadji Malick Cissé	5 January 2008 (aged 17)	(Senegalese Football Federation) Be Sport Academy
5	DF	Cheikh Dieng	7 March 2009 (aged 16)	(Senegalese Football Federation) Diambars
6	MF	Mame Sow	23 November 2008 (aged 16)	(Senegalese Football Federation) Dakar FC
7	FW	Mouhamed Sy	14 March 2008 (aged 17)	(Senegalese Football Federation) Keur Madior
8	FW	Bakary Sonko	2 January 2008 (aged 17)	(Senegalese Football Federation) Ndangane
9	FW	Babacar Bousso	7 May 2008 (aged 17)	(Senegalese Football Federation) AJEL de Rufisque
10	MF	Alwaly Camara	10 May 2008 (aged 17)	(Senegalese Football Federation) Grand-Yoff
11	FW	Victor Mendy	23 November 2008 (aged 16)	(Senegalese Football Federation) Bambey
12	DF	Mignane Ndour	2 July 2008 (aged 17)	(Senegalese Football Federation) Keur Madior
13	MF	Mouhamed Dabo	24 March 2008 (aged 17)	(Senegalese Football Federation) Be Sport Academy
14	MF	Malick Lo	2 June 2009 (aged 16)	(Senegalese Football Federation) Guelwaars
15	MF	Ousseynou Ndiaye	11 October 2008 (aged 17)	(Senegalese Football Federation) United Académie
16	GK	Vincent Gomis	7 February 2008 (aged 17)	(Senegalese Football Federation) Génération Foot
17	DF	Abdoulaye Ndoye	1 September 2008 (aged 17)	(Senegalese Football Federation) UC Thiès
18	MF	Moussa Cissé	20 April 2009 (aged 16)	(Senegalese Football Federation) Génération Foot
19	FW	Moussa Samba	14 July 2008 (aged 17)	(Senegalese Football Federation) SONACOS
20	FW	Étienne Mendy	25 July 2008 (aged 17)	(Senegalese Football Federation) Diambars
21	GK	Assane Sarr	10 July 2010 (aged 15)	(Senegalese Football Federation) Ndangane

=== United Arab Emirates ===
The final 21-player squad was announced on 30 October 2025, days after FIFA released the squad list.

Head coach: Majed Salem Al-Zaabi

No.	Pos.	Player	Date of birth (age)	Club
1	GK	Jassem Abdulla	17 July 2009 (aged 16)	(United Arab Emirates Football Association) Al Jazira
2	MF	Eisa Ahmed	8 April 2009 (aged 16)	(United Arab Emirates Football Association) Kalba
3	DF	Ahmed Ekramy	11 October 2008 (aged 17)	(United Arab Emirates Football Association) Al Jazira
4	DF	Saad Mubarak	24 May 2008 (aged 17)	(United Arab Emirates Football Association) Al Wahda
5	DF	Suhail Al-Noubi	10 August 2008 (aged 17)	(United Arab Emirates Football Association) Al Nasr
6	MF	Ibrahim Yousuf	27 May 2008 (aged 17)	(United Arab Emirates Football Association) Al Wasl
7	FW	Mohamed Yousuf	4 October 2008 (aged 17)	(United Arab Emirates Football Association) Fujairah
8	MF	Abdulla Rashed	12 March 2008 (aged 17)	(United Arab Emirates Football Association) Al Ain
9	FW	Mayed Adel	21 January 2008 (aged 17)	(United Arab Emirates Football Association) Al Nasr
10	MF	Faysal Mohammed	3 September 2008 (aged 17)	(United Arab Emirates Football Association) Al Wahda
11	MF	Mohammed Gamal	3 August 2008 (aged 17)	(United Arab Emirates Football Association) Al Nasr
12	DF	Fahad Khalil	25 January 2008 (aged 17)	(United Arab Emirates Football Association) Al Nasr
13	DF	Saleem Esam	2 December 2008 (aged 16)	(United Arab Emirates Football Association) Al Wasl
14	MF	Mahmoud Badr	18 March 2009 (aged 16)	(United Arab Emirates Football Association) Al Wasl
15	MF	Jayden Adetiba	1 January 2009 (aged 16)	(The Football Association) Ipswich Town
16	MF	Abdullah Mennad	2 October 2008 (aged 17)	(United Arab Emirates Football Association) Sharjah
17	GK	Saeed Ali	18 April 2009 (aged 16)	(United Arab Emirates Football Association) Sharjah
18	FW	Ali Hassan	4 December 2008 (aged 16)	(United Arab Emirates Football Association) Shabab Al Ahli
19	GK	Mubarak Ahmed	1 April 2009 (aged 16)	(United Arab Emirates Football Association) Al Jazira
20	MF	Mohammad Salem	14 September 2008 (aged 17)	(United Arab Emirates Football Association) Al Nasr
21	MF	Abdalla Hatem	19 May 2008 (aged 17)	(Egyptian Football Association) Al Ahly

== Group D ==
=== Argentina ===
The final 21-player squad was announced on 22 October 2025.

Head coach: Diego Placente

No.	Pos.	Player	Date of birth (age)	Club
1	GK	Alber Castelau	13 January 2009 (aged 16)	(Royal Spanish Football Federation) Real Madrid
2	DF	Fernando Closter	18 July 2008 (aged 17)	(Argentine Football Association) Independiente
3	DF	Simón Escobar	17 July 2009 (aged 16)	(Argentine Football Association) Vélez Sarsfield
4	DF	Misael Zalazar	12 March 2008 (aged 17)	(Argentine Football Association) Talleres
5	MF	Santiago Espíndola	17 March 2008 (aged 17)	(Argentine Football Association) River Plate
6	DF	Matías Satas	28 February 2008 (aged 17)	(Argentine Football Association) Boca Juniors
7	FW	Felipe Esquivel	12 May 2008 (aged 17)	(Argentine Football Association) River Plate
8	MF	Jerónimo Gómez Mattar	7 August 2008 (aged 17)	(Argentine Football Association) Newell's Old Boys
9	FW	Thomás De Martis	26 June 2008 (aged 17)	(Argentine Football Association) Lanús
10	MF	Uriel Ojeda	22 March 2008 (aged 17)	(Argentine Football Association) San Lorenzo
11	FW	Ramiro Tulián	19 January 2008 (aged 17)	(Argentine Football Association) Belgrano
12	GK	Juan Manuel Centurión	12 June 2008 (aged 17)	(Argentine Football Association) Independiente
13	DF	Thiago Yánez	6 March 2008 (aged 17)	(Argentine Football Association) Argentinos Juniors
14	DF	Santiago Silveira	24 April 2008 (aged 17)	(Argentine Football Association) Argentinos Juniors
15	MF	Alejandro Tello	8 February 2008 (aged 17)	(Argentine Football Association) Racing
16	MF	Felipe Pujol	23 May 2008 (aged 17)	(Argentine Football Association) Vélez Sarsfield
17	DF	Mateo Martínez	27 April 2008 (aged 17)	(Argentine Football Association) Racing
18	FW	Facundo Jainikoski	15 March 2008 (aged 17)	(Argentine Football Association) Argentinos Juniors
19	FW	Can Armando Güner	7 January 2008 (aged 17)	(German Football Association) Borussia Mönchengladbach
20	MF	Gastón Bouhier	6 November 2008 (aged 16)	(Argentine Football Association) Argentinos Juniors
21	GK	Valentín Reigia	30 September 2009 (aged 16)	(Argentine Football Association) Argentinos Juniors

=== Belgium ===
The final 21-player squad was announced on 20 October 2025.

Head coach: Bob Browaeys

No.	Pos.	Player	Date of birth (age)	Club
1	GK	Lucca Brughmans	27 June 2008 (aged 17)	(Royal Belgian Football Association) Genk
2	DF	Arthur De Kimpe	2 May 2008 (aged 17)	(Royal Belgian Football Association) OH Leuven
3	DF	Brent Jonkers	11 March 2008 (aged 17)	(Royal Dutch Football Association) PSV Eindhoven
4	DF	Jorthy Mokio	29 February 2008 (aged 17)	(Royal Dutch Football Association) Ajax
5	DF	Lucca Darcon	6 February 2008 (aged 17)	(Royal Belgian Football Association) OH Leuven
6	MF	Nathan De Cat	19 July 2008 (aged 17)	(Royal Belgian Football Association) Anderlecht
7	MF	Jessi Da Silva	15 April 2008 (aged 17)	(Royal Belgian Football Association) Club Brugge
8	MF	August De Wannemacker	25 December 2008 (aged 16)	(Royal Belgian Football Association) Genk
9	FW	Stan Naert	2 February 2008 (aged 17)	(Royal Belgian Football Association) Club Brugge
10	MF	Noah Fernandez	9 January 2008 (aged 17)	(Royal Dutch Football Association) PSV Eindhoven
11	MF	Jesse Bisiwu	22 January 2008 (aged 17)	(Royal Belgian Football Association) Club Brugge
12	GK	Bas Evers	2 December 2008 (aged 16)	(Royal Belgian Football Association) Gent
13	DF	Pablo Capilla Rivera	20 November 2008 (aged 16)	(Royal Belgian Football Association) Gent
14	DF	Daan Braspenning	16 January 2008 (aged 17)	(Royal Belgian Football Association) Club Brugge
15	DF	Wout Gielen	5 April 2008 (aged 17)	(Italian Football Federation) Juventus
16	DF	Axl Wins	5 July 2008 (aged 17)	(Royal Belgian Football Association) Club Brugge
17	MF	Loïc Alvarez Fernandez	29 January 2008 (aged 17)	(Royal Belgian Football Association) Genk
18	MF	Ali Camara	13 January 2008 (aged 17)	(Royal Belgian Football Association) Genk
19	FW	René Mitongo	18 January 2008 (aged 17)	(Royal Belgian Football Association) Standard Liège
20	MF	Mohammed El Âdfaoui	28 February 2008 (aged 17)	(Royal Belgian Football Association) Gent
21	GK	Martin Henrion	2 March 2008 (aged 17)	(Royal Dutch Football Association) Ajax

=== Fiji ===
Head coach: Sunil Kumar

No.	Pos.	Player	Date of birth (age)	Club
1	GK	Melvin Prakash	11 February 2008 (aged 17)	(Fiji Football Association) Ba
2	DF	Manasa Kubucaucau	24 May 2008 (aged 17)	Unattached
3	DF	Kanav Gounder	17 August 2009 (aged 16)	(Fiji Football Association) Rakiraki
4	DF	Sialesi Vatanatawake	10 July 2009 (aged 16)	Unattached
5	DF	Farhaan Khan	20 December 2008 (aged 16)	(Football Australia) Mt Druitt Town Rangers
6	DF	Ravuso Sukabula	6 February 2008 (aged 17)	Unattached
7	FW	Rishal Shankar	15 April 2008 (aged 17)	(Fiji Football Association) Suva
8	DF	Jason Dau	30 March 2008 (aged 17)	(Fiji Football Association) Tailevu Naitasiri
9	FW	Tukai Ravonokula	13 February 2008 (aged 17)	(Fiji Football Association) Labasa
10	MF	Maikah Dau	29 April 2009 (aged 16)	(Fiji Football Association) Nasinu
11	MF	Ryan David	1 February 2009 (aged 16)	(Fiji Football Association) Labasa
12	DF	Arav Nadan	11 May 2008 (aged 17)	(Fiji Football Association) Navua
13	DF	Koopah Singh	3 February 2009 (aged 16)	Unattached
14	FW	Veleni Rasorewa	8 May 2008 (aged 17)	(Fiji Football Association) Lautoka
15	FW	Saula Muatini	8 May 2009 (aged 16)	(Fiji Football Association) Ba
16	MF	Elijah Ravea	23 January 2008 (aged 17)	(Fiji Football Association) Lautoka
17	DF	Krishna Samy Jr.	16 May 2008 (aged 17)	(New Zealand Football) Auckland United
18	FW	Teimana Goundar	19 February 2008 (aged 17)	(Football Australia) St Peters
19	FW	Ryan Achari	5 January 2009 (aged 16)	(New Zealand Football) Hamilton Wanderers
20	GK	Isoa Latui	7 August 2008 (aged 17)	(Fiji Football Association) Lautoka
21	GK	Usaia Tamaniqio	11 February 2008 (aged 17)	(Fiji Football Association) Tailevu Naitasiri

=== Tunisia ===
The final 21-player squad was announced on 22 October 2025.

Head coach: Mohamed Amine Naffati

No.	Pos.	Player	Date of birth (age)	Club
1	GK	Youssef Oueslati	15 February 2008 (aged 17)	(Tunisian Football Federation) Étoile du Sahel
2	DF	Ayoub Grira	6 June 2008 (aged 17)	(Tunisian Football Federation) Espérance de Tunis
3	DF	Mehdi Tlili	1 December 2008 (aged 16)	(French Football Federation) Monaco
4	DF	Mohamed Amine Ben Ali	25 January 2008 (aged 17)	(Tunisian Football Federation) Stade Tunisien
5	DF	Abdessalem Akid	25 January 2008 (aged 17)	(Tunisian Football Federation) CS Sfaxien
6	MF	Elyes Dhaoui	15 April 2008 (aged 17)	(Tunisian Football Federation) Olympique Béja
7	FW	Fedi Tayechi	10 March 2008 (aged 17)	(Tunisian Football Federation) Club Africain
8	MF	Saïfedin Haj Abdallah	25 March 2008 (aged 17)	(Royal Belgian Football Association) KFC Houtvenne
9	FW	Anisse Saidi	20 June 2008 (aged 17)	(United States Soccer Federation) San Diego FC
10	MF	Mohamed Aziz Chaabane	10 October 2008 (aged 17)	(Tunisian Football Federation) CA Bizertin
11	FW	Wassim Slama	26 September 2008 (aged 17)	(French Football Federation) Paris Saint-Germain
12	DF	Ali Jaber	31 March 2008 (aged 17)	(Italian Football Federation) Bologna
13	DF	Mohamed Khalil Daouas	24 March 2008 (aged 17)	(Tunisian Football Federation) Étoile du Sahel
14	MF	Mazen Slama	3 June 2008 (aged 17)	(Tunisian Football Federation) US Monastir
15	DF	Louay Ghodhbane	6 June 2008 (aged 17)	(Tunisian Football Federation) Étoile du Sahel
16	GK	Slim Bouaskar	24 June 2009 (aged 16)	(Italian Football Federation) Roma
17	MF	Yessine Ben Mahmoud	21 January 2008 (aged 17)	(French Football Federation) Angers
18	MF	Zinedine Hasni	22 April 2008 (aged 17)	(French Football Federation) Nice
19	FW	Amen Allah Touati	8 March 2008 (aged 17)	(Tunisian Football Federation) Espérance de Tunis
20	MF	Edem Ghalleb	23 July 2008 (aged 17)	(French Football Federation) Paris Saint-Germain
21	GK	Khairi Ben Othman	10 May 2008 (aged 17)	(Tunisian Football Federation) Espérance de Tunis

== Group E ==
=== Egypt ===
The final 21-player squad was announced on 21 October 2025.

Head coach: Ahmed El-Kass

No.	Pos.	Player	Date of birth (age)	Club
1	GK	Omar Abdelaziz	20 January 2008 (aged 17)	(Egyptian Football Association) Zamalek
2	FW	Mohamed Sobih	4 August 2008 (aged 17)	(Egyptian Football Association) Gezira
3	DF	Nour Ashraf	17 May 2008 (aged 17)	(Egyptian Football Association) ENPPI
4	DF	Hamza El Degawy	18 May 2008 (aged 17)	(Egyptian Football Association) Al Ahly
5	DF	Mohanad El Shamy	12 September 2008 (aged 17)	(Egyptian Football Association) Al Ahly
6	DF	Adham Farid	31 December 2008 (aged 16)	(Egyptian Football Association) ENPPI
7	MF	Basel Medhat	17 August 2008 (aged 17)	(Egyptian Football Association) Smouha
8	MF	Mohamed Hamad	5 April 2008 (aged 17)	(Egyptian Football Association) Zamalek
9	FW	Hamza Abdelkarim	1 January 2008 (aged 17)	(Egyptian Football Association) Al Ahly
10	MF	Belal Attia	1 January 2008 (aged 17)	(Egyptian Football Association) Al Ahly
11	DF	Yassin Hossam	6 April 2008 (aged 17)	(Egyptian Football Association) ENPPI
12	MF	Omar Abou Taleb	27 May 2008 (aged 17)	(Egyptian Football Association) ZED
13	DF	Fares Fakhri	30 March 2008 (aged 17)	(Egyptian Football Association) ENPPI
14	DF	Omar Kamal	14 January 2008 (aged 17)	(Egyptian Football Association) Al Ahly
15	DF	Mohamed Bendary	24 May 2008 (aged 17)	(Egyptian Football Association) ENPPI
16	GK	Amr Adel	2 July 2008 (aged 17)	(Egyptian Football Association) ZED
17	FW	Abdelaziz El Zoghbi	20 January 2008 (aged 17)	(Egyptian Football Association) ENPPI
18	FW	Ziad Ayoub	18 March 2008 (aged 17)	(Egyptian Football Association) Al Ahly
19	FW	Ibrahim El Nagaawy	23 August 2008 (aged 17)	(Egyptian Football Association) Ismaily
20	FW	Anas Roshdy	14 May 2008 (aged 17)	(Egyptian Football Association) ENPPI
21	GK	Mohamed Tarek	5 January 2008 (aged 17)	(Egyptian Football Association) ENPPI

=== England ===
The final 21-player squad was announced on 21 October 2025.

Head coach: Neil Ryan

No.	Pos.	Player	Date of birth (age)	Club
1	GK	Jack Porter	15 July 2008 (aged 17)	(The Football Association) Arsenal
2	DF	Dante Headley	18 September 2008 (aged 17)	(The Football Association) Manchester City
3	DF	Landon Emenalo	18 January 2008 (aged 17)	(The Football Association) Chelsea
4	MF	Harrison Miles	28 July 2008 (aged 17)	(The Football Association) Manchester City
5	DF	Jun'ai Byfield	6 December 2008 (aged 16)	(The Football Association) Tottenham Hotspur
6	DF	Freddie Simmonds	9 March 2008 (aged 17)	(The Football Association) Brighton & Hove Albion
7	FW	Ryan McAidoo	24 June 2008 (aged 17)	(The Football Association) Manchester City
8	MF	Seth Ridgeon	12 September 2008 (aged 17)	(The Football Association) Fulham
9	FW	Alejandro Gomes Rodríguez	11 March 2008 (aged 17)	(French Football Federation) Lyon
10	MF	Luca Williams-Barnett	1 October 2008 (aged 17)	(The Football Association) Tottenham Hotspur
11	FW	Tynan Thompson	17 April 2008 (aged 17)	(The Football Association) Tottenham Hotspur
12	MF	Bradley Burrowes	4 March 2008 (aged 17)	(The Football Association) Aston Villa
13	GK	Lanre Awesu	25 January 2008 (aged 17)	(The Football Association) West Ham United
14	FW	Reigan Heskey	19 January 2008 (aged 17)	(The Football Association) Manchester City
15	DF	Kaden Braithwaite	8 February 2008 (aged 17)	(The Football Association) Manchester City
16	DF	Bendito Mantato	25 January 2008 (aged 17)	(The Football Association) Manchester United
17	FW	Igor Tyjon	20 March 2008 (aged 17)	(The Football Association) Blackburn Rovers
18	FW	Chizaram Ezenwata	5 September 2008 (aged 17)	(The Football Association) Chelsea
19	MF	Reggie Walsh	20 October 2008 (aged 17)	(The Football Association) Chelsea
20	MF	Louis Page	10 July 2008 (aged 17)	(The Football Association) Leicester City
21	GK	Dylan Moody	11 March 2008 (aged 17)	(The Football Association) Southampton

=== Haiti ===
The final 21-player squad was announced on 24 October 2025.

Head coach: Eddy César

No.	Pos.	Player	Date of birth (age)	Club
1	GK	Clifford Gene	6 September 2009 (aged 16)	(Jamaica Football Federation) Mount Pleasant
2	DF	Marc-Arthur Alcimé	11 February 2008 (aged 17)	(Haitian Football Federation) Real Hope
3	DF	Wasson Thermoncy	9 July 2008 (aged 17)	(Swiss Football Association) Young Boys
4	DF	Dieuvens Rezil	5 January 2008 (aged 17)	(Jamaica Football Federation) Mount Pleasant
5	MF	Miguel Joseph	14 September 2009 (aged 16)	(Jamaica Football Federation) Mount Pleasant
6	MF	Bill Meranvil	23 March 2008 (aged 17)	(Haitian Football Federation) Toro
7	FW	Woodson Felix	9 November 2008 (aged 16)	(Haitian Football Federation) Real Hope
8	MF	Theo Lacombe	18 February 2009 (aged 16)	(Royal Spanish Football Federation) Sabadell
9	FW	Nikolai Pierre	1 April 2008 (aged 17)	(United States Soccer Federation) Orlando City SC
10	FW	Emerson Laïssé	19 August 2009 (aged 16)	(Jamaica Football Federation) Mount Pleasant
11	FW	Franco Celestin	20 December 2008 (aged 16)	(Jamaica Football Federation) Mount Pleasant
12	GK	Richie Kerly Valcourt	22 March 2008 (aged 17)	(Haitian Football Federation) Real Hope
13	DF	Dave Bernard	30 October 2008 (aged 17)	(Haitian Football Federation) Real Hope
14	DF	Stanley Louis	15 July 2008 (aged 17)	(Haitian Football Federation) Aigle Noir
15	MF	Rhode Louissaint	4 January 2010 (aged 15)	(Haitian Football Federation) Stars des Jeunes
16	DF	Emerson Alexis	7 July 2008 (aged 17)	(Haitian Football Federation) SLG Académie
17	DF	Medinel Zamor	1 January 2008 (aged 17)	(Haitian Football Federation) SLG Académie
18	MF	Djouby Jean-Philippe	28 July 2008 (aged 17)	(Jamaica Football Federation) Mount Pleasant
19	FW	Da-Benz Jacquet	5 January 2008 (aged 17)	(Haitian Football Federation) Aigle Noir
20	FW	Macenat Prophète	20 December 2009 (aged 15)	(Haitian Football Federation) LEG A-Z
21	GK	Grant Leveille	3 July 2008 (aged 17)	(United States Soccer Federation) D.C. United

=== Venezuela ===
The final 21-player squad was announced on 1 November 2025, days after FIFA released the squad list.

Head coach: Oswaldo Vizcarrondo

No.	Pos.	Player	Date of birth (age)	Club
1	GK	Alan Vázquez	10 May 2008 (aged 17)	(Venezuelan Football Federation) Metropolitanos
2	DF	Ricardo Rincones	10 November 2008 (aged 16)	(Venezuelan Football Federation) Monagas
3	DF	Eider Barrios	25 November 2008 (aged 16)	(Venezuelan Football Federation) Caracas
4	DF	Marcos Maitán	18 April 2008 (aged 17)	(Venezuelan Football Federation) Monagas
5	MF	Marco Libra	21 March 2008 (aged 17)	(Italian Football Federation) Bologna
6	MF	Wiliander Muñoz	11 April 2008 (aged 17)	(Venezuelan Football Federation) UCV
7	MF	Gustavo Caraballo	29 August 2008 (aged 17)	(United States Soccer Federation) Orlando City SC
8	MF	Henrry Díaz	3 March 2008 (aged 17)	(Venezuelan Football Federation) Monagas
9	FW	Diego Claut	3 January 2008 (aged 17)	(Venezuelan Football Federation) Deportivo Miranda
10	MF	Yerwin Sulbarán	3 March 2008 (aged 17)	(Venezuelan Football Federation) Monagas
11	MF	Yimvert Berroterán	4 May 2008 (aged 17)	(Venezuelan Football Federation) UCV
12	GK	Ángel Pérez	27 May 2008 (aged 17)	(Venezuelan Football Federation) Academia Puerto Cabello
13	DF	Dioner Fuentes	5 June 2008 (aged 17)	(Venezuelan Football Federation) Monagas
14	MF	Ender Albarrán	23 April 2008 (aged 17)	(Venezuelan Football Federation) Estudiantes de Mérida
15	MF	John Mancilla	19 November 2008 (aged 16)	(Venezuelan Football Federation) Monagas
16	MF	Juan Uribe	18 April 2008 (aged 17)	(Venezuelan Football Federation) Caracas
17	MF	Andrés Bolaño	16 January 2008 (aged 17)	(Football Federation of Chile) Universidad de Chile
18	DF	Román Davis	8 January 2008 (aged 17)	(Venezuelan Football Federation) UCV
19	FW	David García	15 April 2008 (aged 17)	(United States Soccer Federation) Houston Dynamo FC
20	DF	Luigi Pagano	9 July 2008 (aged 17)	(Venezuelan Football Federation) Rayo Zuliano
21	GK	Andrés Lugo	30 September 2008 (aged 17)	(Venezuelan Football Federation) Caracas

== Group F ==
=== Ivory Coast ===
The final 21-player squad was announced on 17 October 2025.

Head coach: Bassiriki Diabaté

No.	Pos.	Player	Date of birth (age)	Club
1	GK	Christ Kouassi	8 October 2008 (aged 17)	(Ivorian Football Federation) Olympique Adiaké
2	MF	Gueu Tiekoman	26 February 2008 (aged 17)	(Ivorian Football Federation) JAC Angré
3	DF	Kouadio Koffi	22 December 2008 (aged 16)	(Ivorian Football Federation) Zoman FC
4	DF	Samba Konate	14 October 2008 (aged 17)	(Ivorian Football Federation) SOL FC
5	DF	Kouame Obli	20 December 2008 (aged 16)	(Ivorian Football Federation) FC Mouna
6	MF	Habib Soumahoro	24 December 2008 (aged 16)	(Ivorian Football Federation) RC Abidjan
7	FW	Bakary Kebe	29 November 2008 (aged 16)	(Ivorian Football Federation) JAC Angré
8	MF	Daan Yoboue	1 November 2008 (aged 17)	(Ivorian Football Federation) ES Bingerville
9	FW	Alynho Haidara	26 July 2008 (aged 17)	(German Football Association) Mainz 05
10	MF	Ismael Toure	11 May 2008 (aged 17)	(Ivorian Football Federation) FC Mouna
11	FW	Allassane Toure	5 November 2009 (aged 16)	(Ivorian Football Federation) RC Abidjan
12	DF	Assabie Ahui	5 March 2008 (aged 17)	(Ivorian Football Federation) AS Tanda
13	DF	Vaboue Doumbia	2 April 2008 (aged 17)	(Ivorian Football Federation) ASEC Mimosas
14	MF	Cheick Malo	26 July 2009 (aged 16)	(Ivorian Football Federation) San Pédro
15	FW	Youbah Coulibaly	29 October 2008 (aged 17)	(Ivorian Football Federation) Zoman FC
16	GK	Paul Koko	24 December 2008 (aged 16)	(Ivorian Football Federation) Zoman FC
17	FW	Kouassi Kouadio	5 May 2008 (aged 17)	(Malian Football Federation) Afrique Football Élite
18	DF	Aboubacar Meite	29 December 2008 (aged 16)	(Malian Football Federation) Afrique Football Élite
19	MF	Tape Touali	11 October 2008 (aged 17)	(Ivorian Football Federation) SOA
20	FW	Hubert Yao	5 November 2009 (aged 16)	(Ivorian Football Federation) San Pédro
21	GK	Aboulaye Cissé	14 November 2008 (aged 16)	(Ivorian Football Federation) LYS Sassandra

=== Mexico ===
The final 21-player squad was announced on 20 October 2025.

Head coach: Carlos Cariño

No.	Pos.	Player	Date of birth (age)	Club
1	GK	Santiago López	18 January 2008 (aged 17)	(Mexican Football Federation) Toluca
2	DF	Adrián Villa	5 March 2008 (aged 17)	(Mexican Football Federation) Pachuca
3	DF	Félix Contreras	13 February 2008 (aged 17)	(United States Soccer Federation) Real Salt Lake
4	DF	Michael Corona	4 January 2008 (aged 17)	(Mexican Football Federation) León
5	DF	Ian Olvera	15 June 2008 (aged 17)	(Mexican Football Federation) Tijuana
6	MF	Kenneth Martínez	23 January 2008 (aged 17)	(Mexican Football Federation) Juárez
7	FW	Luis Gamboa	25 October 2008 (aged 17)	(Mexican Football Federation) Atlas
8	MF	Gael García	4 June 2008 (aged 17)	(Mexican Football Federation) Guadalajara
9	FW	Aldo de Nigris	12 April 2008 (aged 17)	(Mexican Football Federation) Monterrey
10	FW	Máximo Reyes	25 July 2008 (aged 17)	(Mexican Football Federation) Santos Laguna
11	FW	Juan López	16 December 2008 (aged 16)	(Mexican Football Federation) Juárez
12	GK	Abdon Turrubiates	17 November 2008 (aged 16)	(Mexican Football Federation) León
13	DF	José Navarro	7 August 2008 (aged 17)	(Mexican Football Federation) Pachuca
14	FW	José Mancilla	3 June 2008 (aged 17)	(Mexican Football Federation) UNAM
15	MF	Óscar Pineda	29 July 2008 (aged 17)	(United States Soccer Federation) Chicago Fire FC
16	MF	Íñigo Borgio	4 January 2008 (aged 17)	(Royal Spanish Football Federation) Leganés
17	MF	Jorge Sánchez	11 February 2008 (aged 17)	(Mexican Football Federation) Monterrey
18	MF	Jhonnatan Grajales	30 October 2008 (aged 17)	(Mexican Football Federation) Guadalajara
19	FW	Lucca Vuoso	7 November 2008 (aged 16)	(Mexican Football Federation) Santos Laguna
20	MF	Karin Hernández	20 May 2008 (aged 17)	(Mexican Football Federation) León
21	GK	Matías Velázquez	6 October 2008 (aged 17)	(Mexican Football Federation) Santos Laguna

=== South Korea ===
The final 21-player squad was announced on 14 October 2025.

Head coach: Baek Ki-tae

No.	Pos.	Player	Date of birth (age)	Club
1	GK	Park Do-hun	8 April 2008 (aged 17)	(Korea Football Association) Daegu FC
2	DF	Ryu Hye-sung	20 February 2008 (aged 17)	(Korea Football Association) Ulsan HD
3	DF	Kim Do-yeon	21 February 2008 (aged 17)	(Korea Football Association) Daejeon Hana Citizen
4	DF	Jung Hui-seop	26 January 2008 (aged 17)	(Korea Football Association) Jeonbuk Hyundai Motors
5	DF	Koo Hyeon-bin	9 December 2008 (aged 16)	(Korea Football Association) Incheon United
6	DF	Lim Ye-chan	29 February 2008 (aged 17)	(Korea Football Association) Incheon United
7	FW	Kim Do-min	12 July 2008 (aged 17)	(Korea Football Association) Ulsan HD
8	MF	Kim Ji-sung	12 February 2008 (aged 17)	(Korea Football Association) Suwon Samsung Bluewings
9	FW	Kim Eun-seong	17 March 2008 (aged 17)	(Korea Football Association) Daedong Taxation High School
10	FW	Kim Ye-geon	7 August 2008 (aged 17)	(Korea Football Association) Jeonbuk Hyundai Motors
11	FW	Jeong Hyun-woong	16 February 2008 (aged 17)	(Korea Football Association) FC Seoul
12	GK	Choi Ju-ho	12 January 2008 (aged 17)	(Korea Football Association) Ulsan HD
13	DF	Kim Ji-woo	2 January 2009 (aged 16)	(Korea Football Association) Busan IPark
14	MF	Park Hyun-soo	29 January 2008 (aged 17)	(Korea Football Association) Ulsan HD
15	DF	Kim Jung-yeon	15 April 2008 (aged 17)	(Korea Football Association) Incheon United
16	DF	Choi Min-jun	15 April 2009 (aged 16)	(Korea Football Association) Pohang Steelers
17	MF	Oh Ha-ram	12 January 2008 (aged 17)	(Korea Football Association) Jeonnam Dragons
18	MF	Yi Yong-hyeon	2 September 2008 (aged 17)	(Korea Football Association) Ulsan HD
19	FW	Kim Min-chan	13 April 2008 (aged 17)	(Korea Football Association) Ulsan HD
20	FW	Nam I-an	3 January 2009 (aged 16)	(Korea Football Association) Ulsan HD
21	GK	Heo Jae-won	21 May 2008 (aged 17)	(Korea Football Association) Jeju SK

=== Switzerland ===
The final 21-player squad was announced on 26 October 2025, days after FIFA released the squad list.

Head coach: Luigi Pisino

No.	Pos.	Player	Date of birth (age)	Club
1	GK	Théodore Pizarro	13 June 2008 (aged 17)	(German Football Association) SC Freiburg
2	DF	Dario Kaufmann	14 July 2008 (aged 17)	(Swiss Football Association) Luzern
3	DF	Olivier Mambwa	5 December 2008 (aged 16)	(Swiss Football Association) Young Boys
4	DF	Miran Sinani	11 April 2008 (aged 17)	(Swiss Football Association) Basel
5	DF	Gil Zufferey	2 March 2008 (aged 17)	(Swiss Football Association) Young Boys
6	MF	Leonit Ibraimov	16 June 2008 (aged 17)	(Swiss Football Association) St. Gallen
7	FW	Giacomo Koloto	31 January 2008 (aged 17)	(Swiss Football Association) Basel
8	MF	Nico Lazri	29 January 2008 (aged 17)	(Swiss Football Association) Luzern
9	FW	Jérémie Barererwa	1 October 2008 (aged 17)	(Swiss Football Association) Lausanne-Sport
10	MF	Mladen Mijajlovic	16 March 2008 (aged 17)	(German Football Association) SC Freiburg
11	FW	Nevio Scherrer	8 April 2008 (aged 17)	(Swiss Football Association) St. Gallen
12	GK	Noah Brogli	28 May 2008 (aged 17)	(Swiss Football Association) Winterthur
13	DF	Justin Eglin	19 September 2008 (aged 17)	(Swiss Football Association) Basel
14	DF	Erblin Sadikaj	13 March 2008 (aged 17)	(Swiss Football Association) Luzern
15	DF	Aleksandar Sekulic	16 April 2008 (aged 17)	(Swiss Football Association) Zürich
16	DF	Marco Correia Lopes	24 February 2008 (aged 17)	(Swiss Football Association) Basel
17	MF	Ethan Bruchez	7 April 2008 (aged 17)	(Swiss Football Association) Lausanne-Sport
18	MF	Adrien Llukes	21 July 2008 (aged 17)	(Swiss Football Association) Sion
19	FW	Sandro Wyss	3 May 2008 (aged 17)	(Swiss Football Association) Luzern
20	MF	Jill Stiel	1 May 2008 (aged 17)	(Swiss Football Association) Zürich
21	GK	Kader Cherif	11 January 2008 (aged 17)	(Swiss Football Association) Young Boys

== Group G ==
=== Colombia ===
The final 21-player squad was announced on 27 October 2025, days after FIFA released the squad list.

Head coach: Freddy Hurtado

No.	Pos.	Player	Date of birth (age)	Club
1	GK	Juan Covilla	21 September 2008 (aged 17)	(Colombian Football Federation) Deportes Tolima
2	DF	Brait García	7 March 2008 (aged 17)	(Colombian Football Federation) Deportivo Cali
3	DF	Edmilson Herazo	19 September 2008 (aged 17)	(Colombian Football Federation) Barranquilla
4	DF	Jesús Peñaloza	1 August 2008 (aged 17)	(Colombian Football Federation) Unión Magdalena
5	DF	Criss Macías	2 August 2008 (aged 17)	(Colombian Football Federation) Millonarios
6	MF	Cristian Orozco	13 July 2008 (aged 17)	(Colombian Football Federation) Fortaleza
7	MF	Cristian Flórez	1 January 2008 (aged 17)	(Colombian Football Federation) Real Cundinamarca
8	MF	Juan José Cataño	21 May 2008 (aged 17)	(Colombian Football Federation) Envigado
9	FW	Santiago Londoño	29 February 2008 (aged 17)	(Colombian Football Federation) Envigado
10	MF	Deivi Quiñones	24 January 2008 (aged 17)	(Ecuadorian Football Federation) LDU Quito
11	DF	Didier Henao	9 March 2008 (aged 17)	(Colombian Football Federation) Boca Juniors de Cali
12	GK	Jorman Mendoza	14 January 2008 (aged 17)	(Colombian Football Federation) Envigado
13	MF	Camilo Amú	14 March 2008 (aged 17)	(Colombian Football Federation) América de Cali
14	MF	Matías Lozano	23 June 2008 (aged 17)	(Colombian Football Federation) Atlético Nacional
15	DF	Miguel Solarte	11 January 2008 (aged 17)	(Colombian Football Federation) Boca Juniors de Cali
16	FW	Kevin Angulo	4 July 2008 (aged 17)	(Colombian Football Federation) América de Cali
17	MF	José Escorcia	4 July 2009 (aged 16)	(Colombian Football Federation) Atlético Nacional
18	MF	Miguel Agámez	15 May 2009 (aged 16)	(Colombian Football Federation) Atlético Junior
19	MF	Ángel Mora	11 March 2008 (aged 17)	(Colombian Football Federation) Independiente Santa Fe
20	DF	Yaiker Moya	15 September 2009 (aged 16)	(Colombian Football Federation) Atlético Junior
21	GK	David Rodríguez	25 June 2008 (aged 17)	(Colombian Football Federation) Millonarios

=== El Salvador ===
The final 21-player squad was announced on 29 October 2025, days after FIFA released the squad list.

Head coach: Juan Carlos Serrano

No.	Pos.	Player	Date of birth (age)	Club
1	GK	Oliver Alegria Sigernes	10 July 2008 (aged 17)	(Swiss Football Association) Zürich
2	DF	José Guatemala	8 February 2008 (aged 17)	(Salvadoran Football Federation) Águila
3	DF	Anderson Tula	25 April 2008 (aged 17)	(Salvadoran Football Federation) Alianza
4	DF	Marvin Mejía	4 February 2008 (aged 17)	(United States Soccer Federation) Orange County SC
5	DF	Jefferson Perla	22 August 2009 (aged 16)	(Salvadoran Football Federation) Águila
6	MF	Esteban Hernández	22 January 2009 (aged 16)	(Salvadoran Football Federation) Alianza
7	FW	Kerin Torres	16 August 2008 (aged 17)	(Salvadoran Football Federation) Luis Ángel Firpo
8	MF	Rafael Inojosa	11 March 2008 (aged 17)	(United States Soccer Federation) Houston Dynamo FC
9	FW	Luis Tobar	21 April 2008 (aged 17)	(Salvadoran Football Federation) Alianza
10	MF	Anthony Umanzor	29 March 2008 (aged 17)	(Canadian Soccer Association) York United FC
11	MF	Jarell Bonilla	24 May 2008 (aged 17)	(United States Soccer Federation) FC Cincinnati
12	FW	Mayson Barillas	10 June 2009 (aged 16)	(United States Soccer Federation) D.C. United
13	DF	Andrew Reyes	8 January 2008 (aged 17)	(United States Soccer Federation) Cedar Stars Rush
14	FW	Brandon Ramírez	5 September 2008 (aged 17)	(Salvadoran Football Federation) Turín FESA
15	FW	Steven Espinoza	6 May 2008 (aged 17)	(Salvadoran Football Federation) Turín FESA
16	FW	Diego Mejía	29 November 2008 (aged 16)	(Mexican Football Federation) Santos Laguna
17	DF	Emerson Guardado	9 September 2008 (aged 17)	(Salvadoran Football Federation) Alianza
18	GK	Peter Cornejo	30 October 2008 (aged 17)	(United States Soccer Federation) Los Angeles Surf SC
19	FW	Ovidio Hernández	20 July 2008 (aged 17)	(Salvadoran Football Federation) C.D. Aruba
20	DF	Adonis Campos	20 May 2008 (aged 17)	(United States Soccer Federation) New York City FC
21	GK	Alfredo Esquivel	9 March 2008 (aged 17)	(Salvadoran Football Federation) Isidro Metapán

=== Germany ===
The final 21-player squad was announced on 30 October 2025, days after FIFA released the squad list.

Head coach: Marc-Patrick Meister

No.	Pos.	Player	Date of birth (age)	Club
1	GK	Marcello Trippel	3 January 2008 (aged 17)	(German Football Association) Borussia Mönchengladbach
2	DF	Nebe-Sirak Domnic	16 November 2008 (aged 16)	(German Football Association) Bayer Leverkusen
3	DF	Osman Turay	17 March 2008 (aged 17)	(German Football Association) Bayer Leverkusen
4	DF	Elias Vali Fard	15 January 2008 (aged 17)	(German Football Association) Borussia Mönchengladbach
5	DF	Ben Hawighorst	1 March 2008 (aged 17)	(German Football Association) Bayer Leverkusen
6	DF	Mussa Kaba	17 November 2008 (aged 16)	(German Football Association) Borussia Dortmund
7	MF	Benjamin Ley	15 April 2008 (aged 17)	(German Football Association) 1. FC Köln
8	MF	Jeremiah Mensah	21 February 2008 (aged 17)	(German Football Association) Bayer Leverkusen
9	FW	Alexander Staff	12 June 2008 (aged 17)	(German Football Association) Eintracht Frankfurt
10	MF	Eba Bekir İş	1 October 2008 (aged 17)	(German Football Association) Eintracht Frankfurt
11	FW	Wisdom Mike	24 September 2008 (aged 17)	(German Football Association) Bayern Munich
12	GK	Leonard Reiners	18 February 2008 (aged 17)	(German Football Association) 1. FC Köln
13	FW	Abdul Al Khalaf	20 April 2008 (aged 17)	(German Football Association) RB Leipzig
14	MF	Toni Langsteiner	4 August 2008 (aged 17)	(German Football Association) RB Leipzig
15	DF	Niklas Scheller	13 October 2008 (aged 17)	(German Football Association) Eintracht Frankfurt
16	MF	Benno Kaltefleiter	14 February 2008 (aged 17)	(German Football Association) RB Leipzig
17	FW	Maik Afri Akumu	13 July 2008 (aged 17)	(German Football Association) 1. FC Köln
18	MF	Christian Prenaj	16 January 2008 (aged 17)	(German Football Association) Eintracht Frankfurt
19	FW	Lasse Eickel	28 February 2008 (aged 17)	(German Football Association) SC Paderborn
20	DF	Natnael Abraha	14 March 2008 (aged 17)	(German Football Association) TSG Hoffenheim
21	GK	Tjark Möbius	29 July 2008 (aged 17)	(German Football Association) 1. FC Magdeburg

=== North Korea ===
The final 21-player squad was announced on 24 October 2025 through the FIFA official squad list.

Head coach: Rim Chol-min

No.	Pos.	Player	Date of birth (age)	Club
1	GK	Jong Hyon-ju	9 March 2008 (aged 17)	(DPR Korea Football Association) April 25
2	MF	Han Il-bok	30 August 2008 (aged 17)	(DPR Korea Football Association) Kigwancha
3	DF	Choe Chung-hyok	30 January 2008 (aged 17)	(DPR Korea Football Association) April 25
4	DF	Pak Ki-ryong	24 May 2008 (aged 17)	(DPR Korea Football Association) Rimyongsu
5	MF	Kang Myong-bom	17 March 2008 (aged 17)	(DPR Korea Football Association) Ryomyong
6	MF	An Jin-sok	29 October 2008 (aged 17)	(DPR Korea Football Association) Ryomyong
7	MF	Ri Hyok-gwang	21 September 2008 (aged 17)	(DPR Korea Football Association) Ryomyong
8	MF	Ri Ro-gwon	18 July 2009 (aged 16)	(DPR Korea Football Association) Ryomyong
9	MF	Pak Kwang-song	9 March 2008 (aged 17)	(DPR Korea Football Association) April 25
10	FW	Kim Yu-jin	2 April 2008 (aged 17)	(DPR Korea Football Association) April 25
11	FW	Ri Kang-rim	22 March 2008 (aged 17)	(DPR Korea Football Association) Ryomyong
12	DF	Pak Ryong-u	16 November 2008 (aged 16)	(DPR Korea Football Association) Wolmido
13	MF	Ri Tae-myong	8 October 2008 (aged 17)	(DPR Korea Football Association) April 25
14	MF	Kim Tae-guk	20 January 2009 (aged 16)	(DPR Korea Football Association) April 25
15	DF	Kim Se-ung	1 July 2008 (aged 17)	(DPR Korea Football Association) Ryomyong
16	MF	So Jin-song	30 March 2008 (aged 17)	(DPR Korea Football Association) Sobaeksu
17	DF	Ri Kyong-bong	30 April 2008 (aged 17)	(DPR Korea Football Association) April 25
18	GK	Kim Jong-hun	19 May 2008 (aged 17)	(DPR Korea Football Association) Rimyongsu
19	FW	Pak Ju-won	5 February 2009 (aged 16)	(DPR Korea Football Association) Hwaebul
20	DF	Ri Kang-song	22 February 2008 (aged 17)	(DPR Korea Football Association) April 25
21	GK	Min Chol-gyong	3 June 2008 (aged 17)	(DPR Korea Football Association) Hwaebul

== Group H ==
=== Brazil ===
The final 21-player squad was announced on 15 October 2025.

Head coach: Dudu Patetuci

No.	Pos.	Player	Date of birth (age)	Club
1	GK	João Pedro	18 March 2008 (aged 17)	(Brazilian Football Confederation) Santos
2	DF	Angelo	20 October 2008 (aged 17)	(Brazilian Football Confederation) São Paulo
3	DF	Vitor Hugo	12 June 2008 (aged 17)	(Brazilian Football Confederation) Cruzeiro
4	DF	Luis Eduardo	16 January 2008 (aged 17)	(Brazilian Football Confederation) Grêmio
5	MF	Zé Lucas	23 March 2008 (aged 17)	(Brazilian Football Confederation) Sport Recife
6	DF	Derick	11 May 2008 (aged 17)	(Brazilian Football Confederation) Palmeiras
7	FW	Ruan Pablo	23 July 2008 (aged 17)	(Brazilian Football Confederation) Bahia
8	MF	Tiago Augusto	2 February 2008 (aged 17)	(Brazilian Football Confederation) Grêmio
9	FW	Dell	9 June 2008 (aged 17)	(Brazilian Football Confederation) Bahia
10	MF	Gabriel Mec	11 April 2008 (aged 17)	(Brazilian Football Confederation) Grêmio
11	FW	Kayke	26 April 2008 (aged 17)	(Brazilian Football Confederation) Athletico Paranaense
12	GK	Arthur Jampa	30 March 2008 (aged 17)	(Brazilian Football Confederation) Bahia
13	DF	Vitor Fernandes	4 March 2008 (aged 17)	(Brazilian Football Confederation) Atlético Mineiro
14	DF	Luccas Ramon	26 September 2008 (aged 17)	(Brazilian Football Confederation) Palmeiras
15	MF	Luis Pacheco	2 February 2008 (aged 17)	(Brazilian Football Confederation) Palmeiras
16	DF	Arthur Ryan	18 March 2008 (aged 17)	(Brazilian Football Confederation) Fluminense
17	FW	Pietro Tavares	21 December 2008 (aged 16)	(Brazilian Football Confederation) Cruzeiro
18	MF	Vinícius Rocha	3 March 2009 (aged 16)	(Brazilian Football Confederation) Santos
19	MF	Andrey Fernandes	5 February 2008 (aged 17)	(Brazilian Football Confederation) Vasco da Gama
20	MF	Felipe Morais	29 August 2008 (aged 17)	(Brazilian Football Confederation) Cruzeiro
21	GK	Lucas Andrade	7 June 2008 (aged 17)	(Brazilian Football Confederation) Vasco da Gama

=== Honduras ===
The final 21-player squad was announced on 22 October 2025.

Head coach: Israel Canales

No.	Pos.	Player	Date of birth (age)	Club
1	GK	Eliezer Fuentes	3 June 2008 (aged 17)	(United States Soccer Federation) FC Dallas
2	DF	Yensel Morales	18 October 2008 (aged 17)	(National Autonomous Federation of Football of Honduras) Olimpia
3	DF	Emmanuel Martín	24 November 2008 (aged 16)	(National Autonomous Federation of Football of Honduras) Motagua
4	DF	Osmel Medina	4 June 2008 (aged 17)	(National Autonomous Federation of Football of Honduras) Policía Nacional
5	DF	Denzel Arzú	27 January 2009 (aged 16)	(National Autonomous Federation of Football of Honduras) Olimpia
6	MF	Obed Amador	18 January 2008 (aged 17)	(National Autonomous Federation of Football of Honduras) UPNFM
7	FW	Luis Suazo	30 June 2008 (aged 17)	(Portuguese Football Federation) Braga
8	MF	Brayan Cortés	8 April 2008 (aged 17)	(National Autonomous Federation of Football of Honduras) Olimpia
9	FW	David Flores	13 January 2008 (aged 17)	(National Autonomous Federation of Football of Honduras) Olimpia
10	MF	Mike Arana	22 January 2009 (aged 16)	(National Autonomous Federation of Football of Honduras) Real España
11	FW	Marcos Reyes	2 March 2008 (aged 17)	(National Autonomous Federation of Football of Honduras) Victoria
12	GK	Noel Valladares	10 August 2008 (aged 17)	(National Autonomous Federation of Football of Honduras) Olimpia
13	MF	Yochua Palacios	22 February 2008 (aged 17)	(National Autonomous Federation of Football of Honduras) Real España
14	MF	Darell Oliva	24 May 2008 (aged 17)	(National Autonomous Federation of Football of Honduras) Motagua
15	DF	Adonay Oyuela	22 November 2008 (aged 16)	(National Autonomous Federation of Football of Honduras) Motagua
16	MF	Cristopher Vega	2 September 2008 (aged 17)	(National Autonomous Federation of Football of Honduras) Real España
17	MF	Yeison Arriola	8 January 2008 (aged 17)	(National Autonomous Federation of Football of Honduras) Platense
18	MF	Nicolás Balbas	8 May 2008 (aged 17)	(Royal Spanish Football Federation) Deportivo La Coruña
19	FW	Reagan Bodden	5 May 2008 (aged 17)	(National Autonomous Federation of Football of Honduras) Real España
20	MF	Alexander Álvarez	29 June 2008 (aged 17)	(National Autonomous Federation of Football of Honduras) Platense
21	GK	Robben Anderson	4 July 2008 (aged 17)	(National Autonomous Federation of Football of Honduras) Platense

=== Indonesia ===
The final 21-player squad was only announced on 31 October 2025, days after FIFA released the squad list.

Head coach: Nova Arianto

No.	Pos.	Player	Date of birth (age)	Club
1	GK	Rendy Razzaqu	8 January 2008 (aged 17)	(Football Association of Indonesia) Madura United
2	DF	Dafa Zaidan	27 October 2008 (aged 17)	(Football Association of Indonesia) Borneo Samarinda
3	DF	Ida Bagus Cahya	24 February 2008 (aged 17)	(Football Association of Indonesia) Bali United
4	DF	Putu Panji	2 April 2008 (aged 17)	(Football Association of Indonesia) Bali United
5	DF	Mathew Baker	13 May 2009 (aged 16)	(Football Australia) Melbourne City
6	MF	Evandra Florasta	17 June 2008 (aged 17)	(Football Association of Indonesia) Bhayangkara Presisi Lampung
7	MF	Zahaby Gholy	5 December 2008 (aged 16)	(Football Association of Indonesia) Persija Jakarta
8	MF	Nazriel Alfaro	1 February 2008 (aged 17)	(Football Association of Indonesia) Persib Bandung
9	FW	Mierza Firjatullah	15 February 2009 (aged 16)	(Football Association of Indonesia) Persik Kediri
10	FW	Fadly Alberto	22 June 2008 (aged 17)	(Football Association of Indonesia) Bhayangkara Presisi Lampung
11	FW	Dimas Adi Prasetyo	13 April 2008 (aged 17)	(Football Association of Indonesia) PSM Makassar
12	DF	Eizar Tanjung	30 August 2008 (aged 17)	(Football Australia) Sydney FC
13	DF	Lucas Lee	24 February 2008 (aged 17)	(United States Soccer Federation) Ballistic United SC
14	DF	Fabio Azka Irawan	29 February 2008 (aged 17)	(Football Association of Indonesia) Persija Jakarta
15	DF	Ilham Romadhona	23 March 2008 (aged 17)	(Football Association of Indonesia) Borneo Samarinda
16	DF	Algazani Dwi Sugandi	6 January 2008 (aged 17)	(Football Association of Indonesia) Persija Jakarta
17	MF	Rafi Rasyiq	30 November 2008 (aged 16)	(Football Association of Indonesia) Semen Padang
18	FW	Fandi Ahmad Muzaki	1 January 2008 (aged 17)	(Football Association of Indonesia) Persija Jakarta
19	DF	Azizu Milanesta	8 December 2008 (aged 16)	(Football Association of Indonesia) Persik Kediri
20	GK	Dafa Setiawarman	12 February 2008 (aged 17)	(Football Association of Indonesia) Dewa United Banten
21	GK	Mike Rajasa	6 February 2009 (aged 16)	(Royal Dutch Football Association) Utrecht

=== Zambia ===
The final 21-player squad was announced on 1 November 2025, days after FIFA released the squad list.

Head coach: Dennis Makinka

No.	Pos.	Player	Date of birth (age)	Club
1	GK	Wiseman Nyirenda	4 June 2008 (aged 17)	(Football Association of Zambia) Billy Pro Academy
2	DF	Levyson Banda	22 September 2009 (aged 16)	(Football Association of Zambia) Modern Skills Academy
3	DF	Andrew Mwape	20 August 2008 (aged 17)	(Football Association of Zambia) Zanaco
4	DF	Saviour Mwansa	19 April 2008 (aged 17)	(Football Association of Zambia) Kafue Celtic
5	MF	Nelson Chilemu	10 November 2009 (aged 15)	(Football Association of Zambia) Kafue Celtic
6	MF	Bongani Ndhlovu	24 October 2008 (aged 17)	(Football Association of Zambia) Zanaco
7	MF	Robert Banda	26 May 2008 (aged 17)	(Football Association of Zambia) Atletico Lusaka
8	MF	Nthasilwe Malupande	15 November 2009 (aged 15)	(Football Association of Zambia) Kafue Celtic
9	FW	Abel Nyirongo	5 September 2008 (aged 17)	(Football Association of Zambia) Zanaco
10	MF	Felix Phiri	20 January 2008 (aged 17)	(Football Association of Zambia) Zanaco
11	DF	James Sibeene	25 April 2008 (aged 17)	(Football Association of Zambia) Football Chance Academy
12	DF	Lukonde Mwale	17 July 2009 (aged 16)	(Royal Spanish Football Federation) Málaga
13	FW	Daniel Silubonde	16 July 2008 (aged 17)	(Football Association of Zambia) Mørkved Sportsklubb
14	MF	Steven Lungu	22 June 2010 (aged 15)	(Football Association of Zambia) Mørkved Sportsklubb
15	DF	Nkotami Chmwemwe	14 February 2008 (aged 17)	(Football Association of Zambia) Lumwana Radiants
16	GK	Rogers Simumba	1 August 2008 (aged 17)	(Football Association of Zambia) Shamuel Soccer Academy
17	MF	Mapalo Simute	19 March 2009 (aged 16)	(Football Association of Zambia) Mkushi Football Academy
18	GK	Christo Chitambala	15 September 2009 (aged 16)	(Football Association of Zambia) Nkwazi
19	FW	Billy Daka	31 December 2008 (aged 16)	(Football Association of Zambia) Nkwazi
20	DF	Jonathan Kalimina	24 November 2008 (aged 16)	(Football Association of Zambia) Kafue Celtic
21	MF	Kelvin Chipelu	1 January 2009 (aged 16)	(Football Association of Zambia) Forest Rangers

== Group I ==
=== Burkina Faso ===
The final 21-player squad was announced on 31 October 2025, days after FIFA released the squad list.

Head coach: Oscar Barro

No.	Pos.	Player	Date of birth (age)	Club
1	GK	Rahim Ouattara	31 December 2008 (aged 16)	(Burkinabé Football Federation) Colma
2	DF	Ousmane Ouédraogo	11 March 2008 (aged 17)	(French Football Federation) Brest
3	DF	Mikael Coulibaly	30 October 2008 (aged 17)	(Burkinabé Football Federation) Réal du Faso
4	DF	Issouf Dabo	26 May 2009 (aged 16)	(Burkinabé Football Federation) New Stars
5	DF	Fadil Barro	2 April 2008 (aged 17)	(Burkinabé Football Federation) Vitesse
6	MF	Mohamed Fofana	19 May 2008 (aged 17)	(Burkinabé Football Federation) New Stars
7	MF	Ismael Zalle	18 May 2009 (aged 16)	(Burkinabé Football Federation) Réal du Faso
8	MF	Muhammad Zongo	26 November 2009 (aged 15)	(Burkinabé Football Federation) New Stars
9	FW	Halidou Diakité	19 June 2009 (aged 16)	(Burkinabé Football Federation) New Stars
10	MF	Cherif Barro	6 November 2008 (aged 16)	(Burkinabé Football Federation) Rahimo
11	MF	Latif Diaby	20 October 2008 (aged 17)	(Burkinabé Football Federation) Duha
12	DF	Moumine Ouédraogo	31 December 2009 (aged 15)	(Burkinabé Football Federation) US Ouagadougou
13	MF	Moussa Togola	15 November 2008 (aged 16)	(Royal Moroccan Football Federation) Académie Gfiems Football
14	DF	Issouf Sangaré	3 October 2008 (aged 17)	Unattached
15	FW	Mohamed Kaboré	14 September 2008 (aged 17)	(Burkinabé Football Federation) New Stars
16	GK	Prince Ouédraogo	31 December 2009 (aged 15)	(Burkinabé Football Federation) Réal du Faso
17	MF	Eric Ouattara	24 August 2009 (aged 16)	(Burkinabé Football Federation) New Stars
18	MF	Eddie Kogo	27 December 2008 (aged 16)	(Burkinabé Football Federation) Réal du Faso
19	FW	Loukman Tapsoba	30 March 2010 (aged 15)	(Burkinabé Football Federation) Réal du Faso
20	FW	Alassana Bagayogo	24 December 2008 (aged 16)	(Burkinabé Football Federation) AJEB Bobo-Dioulasso
21	GK	Yaya Sagnon	31 December 2009 (aged 15)	Unattached

=== Czech Republic ===
The final 21-player squad was announced on 20 October 2025.

Head coach: Pavel Drsek

No.	Pos.	Player	Date of birth (age)	Club
1	GK	Lukáš Franc	10 June 2009 (aged 16)	(Football Association of the Czech Republic) Sparta Prague
2	DF	Maxim Kotíšek	21 April 2008 (aged 17)	(Football Association of the Czech Republic) Sparta Prague
3	DF	Matyáš Syrovátka	1 April 2008 (aged 17)	(Football Association of the Czech Republic) Hradec Králové
4	DF	Milan Hendericks	28 August 2008 (aged 17)	(Royal Dutch Football Association) VVV Venlo
5	DF	Martin Kovář	7 February 2008 (aged 17)	(Football Association of the Czech Republic) Slavia Prague
6	MF	Nikola Jadrníček	15 February 2008 (aged 17)	(Football Association of the Czech Republic) Sigma Olomouc
7	FW	Matyáš Tomek	1 November 2008 (aged 17)	(Football Association of the Czech Republic) Slavia Prague
8	MF	Lukáš Vaněk	13 January 2008 (aged 17)	(Football Association of the Czech Republic) Hradec Králové
9	FW	Vít Škrkoň	9 April 2008 (aged 17)	(Football Association of the Czech Republic) Baník Ostrava
10	MF	Jan Janega	4 July 2008 (aged 17)	(German Football Association) Mainz 05
11	FW	Petr Potměšil	19 January 2008 (aged 17)	(Football Association of the Czech Republic) Slavia Prague
12	MF	Filip Hruška	29 August 2008 (aged 17)	(Football Association of the Czech Republic) 1. FC Slovácko
13	DF	Sebastian Pech	5 January 2009 (aged 16)	(Football Association of the Czech Republic) Sparta Prague
14	FW	Dominik Zajac	21 June 2008 (aged 17)	(Football Association of the Czech Republic) Baník Ostrava
15	MF	Jan Hájek	21 May 2008 (aged 17)	(Football Association of the Czech Republic) Dukla Prague
16	GK	Kryštof Kostelný	8 February 2008 (aged 17)	(Football Association of the Czech Republic) Zbrojovka Brno
17	FW	Adam Novák	17 June 2008 (aged 17)	(Football Association of the Czech Republic) Viktoria Plzeň
18	DF	Jonáš Topič	8 June 2008 (aged 17)	(Football Association of the Czech Republic) Sparta Prague
19	MF	Hugo Sochůrek	7 June 2008 (aged 17)	(Football Association of the Czech Republic) Sparta Prague
20	MF	Martin Palaščák	25 March 2008 (aged 17)	(Football Association of the Czech Republic) Slavia Prague
21	GK	Adam Paar	5 April 2008 (aged 17)	(Football Association of the Czech Republic) Slavia Prague

=== Tajikistan ===
The final 21-player squad was announced on 1 November 2025, days after FIFA released the squad list.

Head coach: (San Marino) Marco Ragini

No.	Pos.	Player	Date of birth (age)	Club
1	GK	Muhammadrahim Rahmonov	3 January 2009 (aged 16)	(Tajikistan Football Federation) Dushanbe-83
2	DF	Abdusamad Melikmurodov	24 June 2008 (aged 17)	(Tajikistan Football Federation) Sardor
3	DF	Sadriddin Sattorov	15 June 2009 (aged 16)	(Tajikistan Football Federation) Dushanbe-83
4	DF	Mehrojidin Rozykov	10 December 2008 (aged 16)	(Tajikistan Football Federation) Dushanbe-83
5	DF	Mustafo Hasanbekov	29 January 2009 (aged 16)	(Tajikistan Football Federation) Istiklol
6	DF	Bakhodur Nazarzoda	15 September 2008 (aged 17)	(Tajikistan Football Federation) Dushanbe-83
7	FW	Muhammad Nazriev	23 October 2008 (aged 17)	(Tajikistan Football Federation) Istiklol
8	MF	Ramazon Bakhtaliev	24 October 2008 (aged 17)	(Tajikistan Football Federation) Istiklol
9	FW	Nazrullo Ashuralizoda	5 July 2008 (aged 17)	(Tajikistan Football Federation) Dushanbe-83
10	MF	Ahmadjon Shoev	1 August 2008 (aged 17)	(Tajikistan Football Federation) Istiklol
11	MF	Haidarsho Khudoidodov	1 January 2008 (aged 17)	(Tajikistan Football Federation) Eskhata
12	DF	Shukhrat Nurmatov	13 May 2010 (aged 15)	(Tajikistan Football Federation) TFF Academy
13	MF	Zarif Zarifzoda	13 November 2008 (aged 16)	(Tajikistan Football Federation) Dushanbe-83
14	FW	Asadbek Makhtumov	30 January 2009 (aged 16)	(Tajikistan Football Federation) Eskhata
15	MF	Abdullo Ibragimzoda	20 October 2008 (aged 17)	(Tajikistan Football Federation) Dushanbe-83
16	GK	Abubakr Rahmonqulov	5 September 2009 (aged 16)	(Tajikistan Football Federation) Dushanbe-83
17	MF	Parviz Bobonazarov	4 January 2009 (aged 16)	(Tajikistan Football Federation) Istiklol
18	DF	Munavar Anvarzod	31 October 2010 (aged 15)	(Tajikistan Football Federation) TFF Academy
19	DF	Saidjon Khojaev	5 November 2008 (aged 16)	(Tajikistan Football Federation) Ravshan
20	GK	Anushervon Kurbonzoda	11 January 2008 (aged 17)	(Tajikistan Football Federation) Dushanbe-83
21	MF	Mehrubon Odilzoda	15 September 2009 (aged 16)	(Tajikistan Football Federation) Istiklol

=== United States ===
The final 21-player squad was announced on 16 October 2025.

Head coach: (Costa Rica) Gonzalo Segares

No.	Pos.	Player	Date of birth (age)	Club
1	GK	Aidan Stokes	14 January 2008 (aged 17)	(United States Soccer Federation) New York Red Bulls
2	DF	Gio Villa	3 January 2008 (aged 17)	(United States Soccer Federation) Real Salt Lake
3	DF	Pedro Guimaraes	10 April 2008 (aged 17)	(United States Soccer Federation) Orange County SC
4	DF	Christopher Cupps	26 May 2008 (aged 17)	(United States Soccer Federation) Chicago Fire FC
5	DF	Ramiz Hamouda	26 May 2008 (aged 17)	(United States Soccer Federation) Birmingham Legion FC
6	MF	Cavan Sullivan	28 September 2009 (aged 16)	(United States Soccer Federation) Philadelphia Union
7	FW	Nimfasha Berchimas	22 February 2008 (aged 17)	(United States Soccer Federation) Charlotte FC
8	MF	Jude Terry	8 October 2008 (aged 17)	(United States Soccer Federation) Los Angeles FC
9	FW	Chase Adams	17 April 2008 (aged 17)	(United States Soccer Federation) Columbus Crew
10	MF	Máximo Carrizo	28 February 2008 (aged 17)	(United States Soccer Federation) New York City FC
11	FW	Mathis Albert	21 May 2009 (aged 16)	(German Football Association) Borussia Dortmund
12	GK	Jack Kortkamp	28 January 2008 (aged 17)	(United States Soccer Federation) Sporting Kansas City
13	MF	Kellan LeBlanc	17 March 2008 (aged 17)	(United States Soccer Federation) Philadelphia Union
14	DF	Jordan Griffin	25 October 2008 (aged 17)	(United States Soccer Federation) Philadelphia Union
15	MF	Cooper Sanchez	26 March 2008 (aged 17)	(United States Soccer Federation) Atlanta United FC
16	FW	Julian Hall	24 March 2008 (aged 17)	(United States Soccer Federation) New York Red Bulls
17	FW	Jamir Johnson	7 July 2008 (aged 17)	(United States Soccer Federation) Philadelphia Union
18	MF	Luca Moisa	20 April 2008 (aged 17)	(United States Soccer Federation) Real Salt Lake
19	MF	Mateo Tsakiris	5 March 2008 (aged 17)	(United States Soccer Federation) LA Galaxy
20	DF	Enrique Martinez	12 June 2008 (aged 17)	(United States Soccer Federation) LA Galaxy
21	GK	William Lodmell	5 February 2008 (aged 17)	(Portuguese Football Federation) Sporting CP

== Group J ==
=== Panama ===
The final 21-player squad was announced on 20 October 2025.

Head coach: (Argentina) Leonardo Pipino

No.	Pos.	Player	Date of birth (age)	Club
1	GK	Adamir Aparicio	14 January 2009 (aged 16)	(Panamanian Football Federation) Plaza Amador
2	DF	Anthony Ramos	9 April 2008 (aged 17)	(Panamanian Football Federation) Plaza Amador
3	DF	Joseph Pacheco	12 April 2008 (aged 17)	(Panamanian Football Federation) Plaza Amador
4	DF	Shayron Stewart	6 May 2008 (aged 17)	(Panamanian Football Federation) Bocas
5	MF	Pablo Aranda	2 February 2008 (aged 17)	(Panamanian Football Federation) Sporting San Miguelito
6	DF	Héctor Brias	1 May 2008 (aged 17)	(Panamanian Football Federation) Fortaleza
7	DF	Josimar Palacios	14 August 2008 (aged 17)	(Panamanian Football Federation) Sporting San Miguelito
8	MF	Estevis López	22 October 2009 (aged 16)	(Argentine Football Association) River Plate
9	MF	Abraham Altamirano	3 June 2008 (aged 17)	(Panamanian Football Federation) Independiente
10	MF	Adrián Olivardía	24 August 2008 (aged 17)	(Panamanian Football Federation) Tauro
11	MF	Gerson Gordón	18 May 2008 (aged 17)	(Panamanian Football Federation) Bocas
12	GK	David Bonilla	12 April 2008 (aged 17)	(Panamanian Football Federation) Panamá City
13	DF	Renso Reyes	8 February 2009 (aged 16)	(Panamanian Football Federation) Independiente
14	DF	Abraham Salinas	6 March 2008 (aged 17)	(Panamanian Football Federation) Plaza Amador
15	MF	Jossimar Insturain	7 June 2009 (aged 16)	(Panamanian Football Federation) Tauro
16	MF	Héctor Guerra	29 March 2008 (aged 17)	(Panamanian Football Federation) Independiente
17	DF	Stephen Domínguez	19 January 2009 (aged 16)	(Panamanian Football Federation) Sporting San Miguelito
18	FW	Jordan Robles	5 April 2008 (aged 17)	(Panamanian Football Federation) Alianza
19	MF	Edgardo Tovares	8 January 2008 (aged 17)	(Panamanian Football Federation) Plaza Amador
20	MF	Moisés Richards	3 February 2008 (aged 17)	(Panamanian Football Federation) Sporting San Miguelito
21	GK	Daniel Giannotti	10 April 2008 (aged 17)	(Panamanian Football Federation) Tauro

=== Paraguay ===
The final 21-player squad was announced on 20 October 2025.

Head coach: (Argentina) Mariano Uglessich

No.	Pos.	Player	Date of birth (age)	Club
1	GK	Matías Fernández	10 June 2009 (aged 16)	(Paraguayan Football Association) Olimpia
2	DF	Thiago Aranda	25 February 2008 (aged 17)	(Paraguayan Football Association) Olimpia
3	DF	Ymanol Ruiz	12 November 2008 (aged 16)	(Paraguayan Football Association) Olimpia
4	MF	Diego Ruiz	29 March 2008 (aged 17)	(Paraguayan Football Association) Libertad
5	DF	Edgar Ojeda	1 December 2008 (aged 16)	(Paraguayan Football Association) Libertad
6	DF	Leo Cristaldo	12 January 2009 (aged 16)	(Argentine Football Association) Vélez Sarsfield
7	MF	Derlis Almada	14 February 2008 (aged 17)	(Paraguayan Football Association) Libertad
8	MF	Alan Ledesma	4 September 2008 (aged 17)	(Paraguayan Football Association) Olimpia
9	FW	Mauricio De Carvalho	4 February 2008 (aged 17)	(Paraguayan Football Association) Cerro Porteño
10	MF	Carlos Franco	5 January 2008 (aged 17)	(Paraguayan Football Association) Cerro Porteño
11	FW	José Buhring	17 February 2008 (aged 17)	(Paraguayan Football Association) Libertad
12	GK	Rainero Laratro	7 March 2008 (aged 17)	(Paraguayan Football Association) Libertad
13	DF	Mauro Coronel	25 May 2008 (aged 17)	(Paraguayan Football Association) Nacional
14	MF	Jhosias Campss	17 February 2008 (aged 17)	(Paraguayan Football Association) Nacional
15	MF	Aldo Sanabria	9 May 2008 (aged 17)	(Paraguayan Football Association) Cerro Porteño
16	MF	Manuel Cáceres	13 February 2009 (aged 16)	(Paraguayan Football Association) Guaraní
17	MF	Thiago Vera	14 June 2008 (aged 17)	(Paraguayan Football Association) Libertad
18	FW	Milán Freyres	8 December 2008 (aged 16)	(Paraguayan Football Association) Olimpia
19	DF	Tobías Acosta	23 January 2008 (aged 17)	(Paraguayan Football Association) Olimpia
20	MF	Pedro Villalba	9 July 2008 (aged 17)	(Paraguayan Football Association) Libertad
21	GK	Diego Rodríguez	22 July 2008 (aged 17)	(Paraguayan Football Association) Cerro Porteño

=== Republic of Ireland ===
The final 21-player squad was announced on 21 October 2025.

Head coach: Colin O'Brien

No.	Pos.	Player	Date of birth (age)	Club
1	GK	Alex Noonan	15 July 2008 (aged 17)	(Football Association of Ireland) Shamrock Rovers
2	DF	Josh Cullen	30 March 2008 (aged 17)	(Football Association of Ireland) Finn Harps
3	DF	Finn Sherlock	4 July 2008 (aged 17)	(German Football Association) TSG Hoffenheim
4	DF	Oisin McDonagh	27 June 2008 (aged 17)	(Italian Football Federation) Venezia
5	DF	Vinnie Leonard	21 March 2008 (aged 17)	(Football Association of Ireland) Dundalk
6	MF	**Rory Finneran**	29 February 2008 (aged 17)	(The Football Association) Newcastle United
7	MF	Grady McDonnell	17 February 2008 (aged 17)	(Royal Belgian Football Association) Club Brugge
8	MF	Kian McMahon-Brown	3 August 2008 (aged 17)	(The Football Association) Burnley
9	FW	Michael Noonan	31 July 2008 (aged 17)	(Football Association of Ireland) Shamrock Rovers
10	MF	Ramón Martos	20 May 2008 (aged 17)	(Royal Spanish Football Federation) Almería
11	FW	**Jaden Umeh**	18 March 2008 (aged 17)	(Portuguese Football Federation) Benfica
12	DF	Ryan Butler	15 January 2008 (aged 17)	(Football Association of Ireland) Wexford
13	DF	Ade Solanke	9 January 2008 (aged 17)	(French Football Federation) Lorient
14	MF	Gavin McAteer	2 July 2008 (aged 17)	(Football Association of Ireland) Finn Harps
15	FW	Victor Ozhianvuna	10 January 2009 (aged 16)	(Football Association of Ireland) Shamrock Rovers
16	GK	George Moloney	17 November 2009 (aged 15)	(The Football Association) Southampton
17	FW	Max Kovalevskis	9 February 2008 (aged 17)	(Football Association of Ireland) Shamrock Rovers
18	FW	Brody Lee	31 July 2008 (aged 17)	(Football Association of Ireland) Cork City
19	FW	Goodness Ogbonna	2 January 2008 (aged 17)	(Football Association of Ireland) UCD
20	DF	Sean Spaight	25 January 2009 (aged 16)	(Football Association of Ireland) Dundalk
21	GK	Corey Sheridan	6 June 2008 (aged 17)	(Football Association of Ireland) Finn Harps

=== Uzbekistan ===
The final 21-player squad was announced by the Uzbekistan Football Association on 31 October 2025, days after FIFA released the squad list.

Head coach: Islombek Ismoilov

No.	Pos.	Player	Date of birth (age)	Club
1	GK	Ibrokhim Shokirov	18 March 2008 (aged 17)	(Uzbekistan Football Association) Pakhtakor
2	MF	Kakhramon Turgunov	26 February 2008 (aged 17)	(Uzbekistan Football Association) Namangan FA
3	DF	Mukhammad Khakimov	4 October 2009 (aged 16)	(Uzbekistan Football Association) Pakhtakor
4	DF	Muminkhon Bakhodirkhonov	30 March 2008 (aged 17)	(Uzbekistan Football Association) Olympic Tashkent
5	DF	Amirkhon Muradov	15 June 2008 (aged 17)	(Uzbekistan Football Association) Pakhtakor
6	DF	Miraziz Abdukarimov	11 May 2008 (aged 17)	(Uzbekistan Football Association) Sogdiana
7	MF	Sadriddin Khasanov	21 May 2008 (aged 17)	(Uzbekistan Football Association) Bunyodkor
8	MF	Abdusamad Saidov	30 May 2008 (aged 17)	(Uzbekistan Football Association) Pakhtakor
9	FW	Nurbek Sarsenbaev	27 September 2008 (aged 17)	(Uzbekistan Football Association) Neftchi Fergana
10	MF	Mukhammad Khabibullaev	29 January 2008 (aged 17)	(Uzbekistan Football Association) Lokomotiv Tashkent
11	MF	Sayfiddin Sodikov	27 June 2008 (aged 17)	(Uzbekistan Football Association) Olympic Tashkent
12	GK	Bakhodir Izboskanov	22 July 2008 (aged 17)	(Uzbekistan Football Association) Bunyodkor
13	DF	Abdumalik Anvarov	14 June 2008 (aged 17)	(Uzbekistan Football Association) Pakhtakor
14	DF	Bekhruz Saidmurodov	9 February 2008 (aged 17)	(Uzbekistan Football Association) Pakhtakor
15	DF	Mukhammadali Musakhonov	18 December 2008 (aged 16)	(Uzbekistan Football Association) Olympic Tashkent
16	MF	Azizbek Abdumuminov	4 November 2008 (aged 16)	(Uzbekistan Football Association) Mashʼal Mubarek
17	MF	Jamshidbek Rustamov	26 March 2008 (aged 17)	(Uzbekistan Football Association) Olympic Tashkent
18	MF	Abubakir Shukurullaev	2 February 2008 (aged 17)	(Uzbekistan Football Association) Pakhtakor
19	MF	Azizbek Erimbetov	4 April 2008 (aged 17)	(Uzbekistan Football Association) Neftchi
20	FW	Asilbek Aliev	1 January 2009 (aged 16)	(Uzbekistan Football Association) Olympic Tashkent
21	GK	Nematullo Rustamzhonov	17 March 2008 (aged 17)	(Uzbekistan Football Association) Olympic Tashkent

== Group K ==
=== Canada ===
The final 21-player squad was announced on 21 October 2025.Owen Graham-Roache and André Ali-Gayapersad withdrew due to injury on 29 October and were replaced by Marius Aiyenero and Antone Bossenberry respectively. On 4 November, Stefan Kapor was replaced by Sasha Cernic due to injury.

Head coach: Mike Vitulano

No.	Pos.	Player	Date of birth (age)	Club
1	GK	Jonathan Ransom	8 January 2008 (aged 17)	(United States Soccer Federation) Atlanta United FC 2
2	DF	Sahil Deo	7 April 2008 (aged 17)	(Canadian Soccer Association) Whitecaps FC 2
3	MF	William Daniels	27 June 2008 (aged 17)	(The Football Association) Leicester City U18
4	MF	Dylan Judelson	5 June 2008 (aged 17)	(United States Soccer Federation) Orlando City SC B
5	DF	Josh-Duc Nteziryayo	15 November 2008 (aged 16)	(Canadian Soccer Association) CF Montréal
6	DF	Sergei Kozlovskiy	18 June 2008 (aged 17)	(Canadian Soccer Association) Atlético Ottawa
7	FW	Shola Jimoh	8 April 2008 (aged 17)	(Canadian Soccer Association) York United FC
8	MF	Kevin Khan	30 May 2008 (aged 17)	(Royal Dutch Football Association) Feyenoord Academy
9	FW	Marius Aiyenero	23 May 2008 (aged 17)	(United States Soccer Federation) Los Angeles FC 2
10	FW	Aidan Evans	1 November 2008 (aged 17)	(The Football Association) Fulham U18
11	FW	Antone Bossenberry	14 August 2008 (aged 17)	(Canadian Soccer Association) Toronto FC II
12	GK	Milo Beimers	5 June 2008 (aged 17)	(Irish Football Association) Glentoran
13	DF	Richard Chukwu	25 February 2008 (aged 17)	(Canadian Soccer Association) Toronto FC II
14	MF	Timothy Fortier	22 December 2008 (aged 16)	(Canadian Soccer Association) Toronto FC II
15	DF	Elijah Roche	28 January 2008 (aged 17)	(Canadian Soccer Association) Toronto FC II
16	MF	Yuma Tsuji	9 June 2008 (aged 17)	(Canadian Soccer Association) Whitecaps FC 2
17	FW	Johnny Selemani	16 August 2008 (aged 17)	(Canadian Soccer Association) Whitecaps FC 2
18	MF	Aghilas Sadek	15 July 2008 (aged 17)	(Canadian Soccer Association) CF Montréal Academy
19	DF	Sasha Cernic	7 April 2008 (aged 17)	(Italian Football Federation) Sampdoria U19
20	FW	Van Parker	29 January 2009 (aged 16)	(United States Soccer Federation) Real Monarchs
21	GK	Samsy Keita	27 July 2009 (aged 16)	(Canadian Soccer Association) CF Montréal

=== Chile ===
The final 21-player squad was announced on 18 October 2025.

Head coach: Sebastián Miranda

No.	Pos.	Player	Date of birth (age)	Club
1	GK	Vicente Villegas	23 August 2009 (aged 16)	(Football Federation of Chile) Coquimbo Unido
2	DF	Francisco Daza	1 February 2008 (aged 17)	(Football Federation of Chile) Universidad Católica
3	DF	Bruno Torres	28 January 2008 (aged 17)	(Football Federation of Chile) Colo-Colo
4	DF	Matías Orellana	2 May 2008 (aged 17)	(Football Federation of Chile) Colo-Colo
5	DF	Alonso Olguín	8 February 2008 (aged 17)	(Football Federation of Chile) Colo-Colo
6	MF	Sebastián Vargas	19 May 2008 (aged 17)	(Football Federation of Chile) Santiago Wanderers
7	FW	Ian Alegría	3 May 2008 (aged 17)	(Football Federation of Chile) Palestino
8	MF	Matías París	24 April 2008 (aged 17)	(Football Federation of Chile) O'Higgins
9	FW	Yastin Cuevas	29 March 2008 (aged 17)	(Football Federation of Chile) Colo-Colo
10	FW	Zidane Yáñez	26 January 2008 (aged 17)	(United States Soccer Federation) New York City FC
11	MF	Antonio Riquelme	8 August 2008 (aged 17)	(United States Soccer Federation) Real Salt Lake
12	GK	Excequiel Bustamante	30 March 2008 (aged 17)	(Football Federation of Chile) Everton
13	FW	Javier Gutiérrez	14 January 2008 (aged 17)	(Football Federation of Chile) O'Higgins
14	MF	Cristián Díaz	15 May 2008 (aged 17)	(Football Federation of Chile) Colo-Colo
15	DF	Jaime Poblete	19 June 2008 (aged 17)	(Football Federation of Chile) Universidad de Concepción
16	MF	Nicolás Pérez	30 January 2008 (aged 17)	(Football Federation of Chile) Deportes Temuco
17	DF	Joaquín Meneses	8 May 2008 (aged 17)	(Football Federation of Chile) Universidad Católica
18	FW	Amaro Pérez	2 September 2009 (aged 16)	(Football Federation of Chile) Universidad Católica
19	FW	Jhon Cortés	24 July 2008 (aged 17)	(Football Federation of Chile) Universidad de Chile
20	DF	Martín Jiménez	6 February 2008 (aged 17)	(Football Federation of Chile) Audax Italiano
21	GK	Cristóbal del Río	9 February 2010 (aged 15)	(Football Federation of Chile) Universidad Católica

=== France ===
The final 21-player squad was announced on 21 October 2025.

Head coach: Lionel Rouxel

No.	Pos.	Player	Date of birth (age)	Club
1	GK	Ilan Jourdren	17 July 2008 (aged 17)	(French Football Federation) Lens
2	DF	Isyak Mohamed	21 February 2008 (aged 17)	(French Football Federation) Montpellier
3	DF	Lucas Batbedat	1 August 2008 (aged 17)	(French Football Federation) Paris Saint-Germain
4	DF	Abdoulaye Nassoko	29 March 2008 (aged 17)	(French Football Federation) Metz
5	DF	Ruben Lomet	20 August 2008 (aged 17)	(French Football Federation) Rennes
6	MF	Abdoulaye Camara	28 September 2008 (aged 17)	(Italian Football Federation) Udinese
7	FW	Rémi Himbert	29 February 2008 (aged 17)	(French Football Federation) Lyon
8	MF	Soan Ameline	29 May 2008 (aged 17)	(French Football Federation) Caen
9	FW	Antoine Valero	8 July 2008 (aged 17)	(French Football Federation) Marseille
10	FW	Christ Batola	3 June 2009 (aged 16)	(French Football Federation) Troyes
11	MF	Jah-Mason Telusson	20 May 2008 (aged 17)	(French Football Federation) Nice
12	DF	Isaïah Bohui	17 March 2008 (aged 17)	(French Football Federation) Paris FC
13	DF	Emmanuel Mbemba	20 March 2008 (aged 17)	(French Football Federation) Paris Saint-Germain
14	DF	Ilian Ounissi	28 March 2008 (aged 17)	(French Football Federation) Troyes
15	MF	Believe Munongo	23 November 2009 (aged 15)	(French Football Federation) Metz
16	GK	Max-Edgar Chabot	1 April 2008 (aged 17)	(French Football Federation) Angers
17	MF	Milan Leccese	30 November 2008 (aged 16)	(French Football Federation) Marseille
18	FW	Pierre Mounguengue	3 January 2008 (aged 17)	(French Football Federation) Paris Saint-Germain
19	MF	Kaïs Lesueur	16 June 2008 (aged 17)	(French Football Federation) Valenciennes
20	FW	Tidiane Diarrassouba	29 August 2008 (aged 17)	(French Football Federation) Reims
21	GK	Ylann Marie-Rose	20 August 2008 (aged 17)	(French Football Federation) Dijon

=== Uganda ===
The final 21-player squad was announced only announced by the Federation of Uganda Football Associations on 30 October 2025, days after FIFA released the squad list.

Head coach: Brian Ssenyondo

No.	Pos.	Player	Date of birth (age)	Club
1	GK	Adrian Mukwanga	25 May 2010 (aged 15)	(Federation of Uganda Football Associations) Vipers
2	DF	Jovan Nsereko Mukisa	29 May 2009 (aged 16)	(Federation of Uganda Football Associations) NEC
3	DF	Hamuza Sengooba	2 February 2008 (aged 17)	(Federation of Uganda Football Associations) Masaka Sunshine
4	DF	Steven Oyirwoth	24 September 2009 (aged 16)	(Federation of Uganda Football Associations) Kampala Capital City Authority
5	MF	Brian Jjara	24 October 2008 (aged 17)	(Federation of Uganda Football Associations) Kampala Capital City Authority
6	DF	Elvis Torach	25 February 2008 (aged 17)	(Federation of Uganda Football Associations) Masaka Sunshine
7	MF	Derick Ssozi	1 June 2008 (aged 17)	(Federation of Uganda Football Associations) Fort Portal Taxi Operators
8	MF	Abubakali Walusimbi	27 December 2008 (aged 16)	(Federation of Uganda Football Associations) Vipers
9	FW	James Bogere	2 February 2008 (aged 17)	(Federation of Uganda Football Associations) Masaka Sunshine
10	MF	Isima Magala	28 July 2009 (aged 16)	(Federation of Uganda Football Associations) Masaka Sunshine
11	FW	Richard Okello	27 March 2008 (aged 17)	(Federation of Uganda Football Associations) BUL Jinja
12	MF	John Asiimwe	15 October 2008 (aged 17)	(Federation of Uganda Football Associations) Express
13	MF	Nuweagaba Kamurungi	16 October 2010 (aged 15)	(Federation of Uganda Football Associations) Kitara
14	FW	Simon Wanyama	20 December 2009 (aged 15)	(Federation of Uganda Football Associations) Kitara
15	FW	Shakur Magogo	15 December 2008 (aged 16)	(Federation of Uganda Football Associations) Namilyango College
16	MF	John Owino	5 June 2009 (aged 16)	(Federation of Uganda Football Associations) Express
17	FW	Arafat Nkoola	26 December 2008 (aged 16)	(Federation of Uganda Football Associations) Vipers
18	GK	Edrisah Waibi	28 June 2008 (aged 17)	(Federation of Uganda Football Associations) Buddo Secondary School
19	GK	Gilbert Mazige	15 September 2008 (aged 17)	(Federation of Uganda Football Associations) NEC
20	FW	Enock Bagenda	9 September 2008 (aged 17)	(Federation of Uganda Football Associations) Kampala Capital City Authority
21	DF	Abdul Ntege	1 January 2010 (aged 15)	(Federation of Uganda Football Associations) Maroons

== Group L ==
=== Austria ===
The final 21-player squad was announced on 21 October 2025.

Head coach: Hermann Stadler

No.	Pos.	Player	Date of birth (age)	Club
1	GK	Paul Scharner	14 March 2008 (aged 17)	(Austrian Football Association) AKA St. Pölten NÖ
2	DF	Rafael Feldinger	12 August 2008 (aged 17)	(Austrian Football Association) Red Bull Salzburg
3	DF	Sergej Savic	22 June 2008 (aged 17)	(Austrian Football Association) Admira Wacker
4	DF	Jakob Pokorny	23 February 2008 (aged 17)	(Austrian Football Association) Red Bull Salzburg
5	DF	Ifeanyi Ndukwe	3 March 2008 (aged 17)	(Austrian Football Association) Austria Wien
6	MF	Loris Husic	17 January 2008 (aged 17)	(German Football Association) 1860 Munich
7	FW	Nicolas Jozepovic	16 January 2008 (aged 17)	(Austrian Football Association) Red Bull Salzburg
8	MF	Jakob Werner	14 March 2008 (aged 17)	(Austrian Football Association) Red Bull Salzburg
9	FW	Hasan Deshishku	23 February 2008 (aged 17)	(Austrian Football Association) Austria Wien
10	MF	Vasilije Markovic	12 May 2008 (aged 17)	(Austrian Football Association) Austria Wien
11	FW	Dominik Dobis	20 January 2009 (aged 16)	(Austrian Football Association) Red Bull Salzburg
12	GK	Christof Katzmayr	10 May 2008 (aged 17)	(Austrian Football Association) LASK
13	FW	Kenny Nzogang	2 August 2008 (aged 17)	(Austrian Football Association) Rapid Wien
14	MF	Daniel Frauscher	14 June 2008 (aged 17)	(Austrian Football Association) Ried
15	DF	Emil Ganser	5 March 2008 (aged 17)	(Austrian Football Association) Red Bull Salzburg
16	DF	Julian Halmich	6 March 2008 (aged 17)	(Austrian Football Association) AKA St. Pölten NÖ
17	MF	Filip Aleksic	10 June 2009 (aged 16)	(Austrian Football Association) Red Bull Salzburg
18	MF	Luca Weinhandl	11 January 2009 (aged 16)	(Austrian Football Association) Sturm Graz
19	MF	Johannes Moser	16 January 2008 (aged 17)	(Austrian Football Association) Red Bull Salzburg
20	DF	Florian Hofmann	20 January 2008 (aged 17)	(Austrian Football Association) Red Bull Salzburg
21	GK	Daniel Posch	23 January 2008 (aged 17)	(German Football Association) Mainz 05

=== Mali ===
The final 21-player squad was announced on 31 October 2025, days after FIFA released the squad list.

Head coach: Adama Diallo

No.	Pos.	Player	Date of birth (age)	Club
1	GK	Lamine Sinaba	5 April 2008 (aged 17)	(Malian Football Federation) Académie Football Cherifla
2	DF	Mahamadou Konaté	8 June 2009 (aged 16)	(Malian Football Federation) Diarra
3	MF	Ibrahim Diakité	10 July 2008 (aged 17)	(Malian Football Federation) JMG Academy
4	DF	Tiémoko Berthé	17 February 2008 (aged 17)	(Malian Football Federation) Étoiles du Mandé
5	DF	Aboubacar Camara	11 August 2010 (aged 15)	(Malian Football Federation) Afrique Football Élite
6	DF	Modibo Coulibaly	5 October 2009 (aged 16)	(Malian Football Federation) Kingui
7	FW	Zoumana Ballo	17 February 2008 (aged 17)	(Malian Football Federation) Yeelen Olympique
8	MF	Issa Koné	11 October 2008 (aged 17)	(Malian Football Federation) Académie Africa Foot
9	FW	Ndjicoura Raymond Bomba	12 March 2008 (aged 17)	(Malian Football Federation) Sportif de Bamako
10	MF	Seydou Dembélé	16 February 2008 (aged 17)	(Malian Football Federation) JMG Academy
11	FW	Salif Traoré	20 March 2009 (aged 16)	(Malian Football Federation) Académie Football Barô Diallo
12	DF	Souleymane Doumbia	27 February 2008 (aged 17)	(Malian Football Federation) Derby Académie
13	MF	Soumaila Fané	25 December 2009 (aged 15)	(Malian Football Federation) Académie Football Barô Diallo
14	DF	Mohamed Traoré	23 April 2009 (aged 16)	(Malian Football Federation) Académie Bomissala
15	FW	Famory Sangaré	8 March 2008 (aged 17)	(French Football Federation) Racing Club de France
16	GK	Mamadou Sacko	16 September 2009 (aged 16)	(Malian Football Federation) ABM Foot Academy
17	MF	Mahamadou Traoré	17 November 2009 (aged 15)	(Malian Football Federation) Académie Players Dreams
18	DF	Samba Konaré	7 April 2008 (aged 17)	(Malian Football Federation) Stade Malien
19	MF	Mohamed Dhiarra	18 November 2008 (aged 16)	(Malian Football Federation) Djoliba AC
20	DF	Lamine Keita	20 November 2009 (aged 15)	(Malian Football Federation) Académie Football Barô Diallo
21	GK	Cheick Diarra	19 January 2010 (aged 15)	(Malian Football Federation) Diarra

=== New Zealand ===
The final 21-player squad was announced on 16 October 2025.

Head coach: Martin Bullock

No.	Pos.	Player	Date of birth (age)	Club
1	GK	Toby Borgnis	30 September 2008 (aged 17)	(The Football Association) Reading
2	DF	Joe McIntyre	30 January 2009 (aged 16)	(New Zealand Football) Wellington Phoenix
3	DF	Alex Lienard	28 October 2008 (aged 17)	(The Football Association) Sunderland
4	DF	Ethan Dyer	24 June 2009 (aged 16)	(Football Australia) Sydney FC
5	DF	Evan Masamba	27 March 2008 (aged 17)	(New Zealand Football) Auckland FC
6	MF	Damion Kim	29 August 2008 (aged 17)	(New Zealand Football) East Coast Bays
7	FW	Jack Perniskie	7 January 2008 (aged 17)	(New Zealand Football) Wellington Phoenix
8	MF	Van Fitzharris	23 January 2008 (aged 17)	(New Zealand Football) Auckland FC
9	FW	Justin Cardozo	4 January 2008 (aged 17)	(Football Australia) Macarthur FC
10	MF	Will Britton	27 March 2008 (aged 17)	(New Zealand Football) Western Springs
11	FW	Matías Núñez	1 November 2009 (aged 16)	(New Zealand Football) Auckland United
12	GK	Joseph Chalabi	7 March 2009 (aged 16)	(New Zealand Football) Wellington Phoenix
13	FW	Aaron Cartwright	5 July 2008 (aged 17)	(Football Australia) Melbourne City
14	DF	Jackson O’Reilly	29 April 2008 (aged 17)	(Football Australia) Brisbane Roar
15	DF	Luka Vicelich	30 June 2008 (aged 17)	(New Zealand Football) Auckland FC
16	MF	Michael Wong	23 February 2008 (aged 17)	(New Zealand Football) Auckland United
17	DF	Sean Kane	15 September 2009 (aged 16)	(New Zealand Football) Eastern Suburbs
18	DF	Daniel Nelson	24 January 2008 (aged 17)	(New Zealand Football) Wellington Phoenix
19	MF	Nathan Martin	19 April 2008 (aged 17)	(New Zealand Football) Auckland FC
20	FW	Benjamin Perez Baldoni	30 July 2009 (aged 16)	(New Zealand Football) Auckland FC
21	GK	William Martin	26 January 2010 (aged 15)	(Football Australia) Queensland Lions

=== Saudi Arabia ===
The final 21-player squad was announced on 1 November 2025, days after FIFA released the squad list.

Head coach: Abdulwahab Al-Harbi

No.	Pos.	Player	Date of birth (age)	Club
1	GK	Mohammed Al-Otaibi	17 July 2008 (aged 17)	(Saudi Arabian Football Federation) Al-Shabab
2	DF	Thari Saeed	25 June 2008 (aged 17)	(Saudi Arabian Football Federation) Al-Hilal
3	DF	Nasser Al-Fihani	21 May 2008 (aged 17)	(Saudi Arabian Football Federation) Al-Ettifaq
4	MF	Abdullah Al-Dawsari	26 March 2009 (aged 16)	(Saudi Arabian Football Federation) Al-Faisaly
5	MF	Mohammed Madkhali	4 December 2008 (aged 16)	(Saudi Arabian Football Federation) Al-Hilal
6	MF	Saeed Al-Dosari	30 January 2008 (aged 17)	(Saudi Arabian Football Federation) Al-Qadsiah
7	FW	Waleed Al-Nour	18 February 2008 (aged 17)	(Saudi Arabian Football Federation) Mahd Sports Academy
8	MF	Maher Tawashi	2 April 2008 (aged 17)	(Saudi Arabian Football Federation) Al-Nassr
9	FW	Abdulhadi Matari	28 February 2008 (aged 17)	(Saudi Arabian Football Federation) Al-Ittihad
10	MF	Abdulrahman Sufyani	15 April 2008 (aged 17)	(Saudi Arabian Football Federation) Al-Nassr
11	FW	Sabri Dahal	29 February 2008 (aged 17)	(Saudi Arabian Football Federation) Al-Fayha
12	DF	Adel Hibah	4 February 2008 (aged 17)	(Saudi Arabian Football Federation) Al-Hilal
13	DF	Osama Al-Daghmah	25 June 2008 (aged 17)	(Saudi Arabian Football Federation) Al-Ahli
14	MF	Habeeb Al-Antif	26 June 2008 (aged 17)	(Saudi Arabian Football Federation) Al-Nassr
15	MF	Mohammed Al-Khalaf	24 November 2008 (aged 16)	(Saudi Arabian Football Federation) Al-Ettifaq
16	GK	Wafi Al-Aklubi	11 February 2008 (aged 17)	(Saudi Arabian Football Federation) Al-Qadsiah
17	MF	Ibrahim Azzam	14 April 2008 (aged 17)	(Saudi Arabian Football Federation) Al-Ahli
18	MF	Abdul Aziz Al-Fawaz	28 March 2008 (aged 17)	(Saudi Arabian Football Federation) Al-Fateh
19	DF	Mukhtar Barnawi	11 March 2008 (aged 17)	(Saudi Arabian Football Federation) Al-Hilal
20	DF	Abu Baker Saeed	18 December 2008 (aged 16)	(Saudi Arabian Football Federation) Al-Qadsiah
21	GK	Abdulrahman Al-Otaibi	5 February 2008 (aged 17)	(Saudi Arabian Football Federation) Al-Nassr
