= Ryan Butler (footballer) =

Irish footballer (born 2008)

Personal information
- Date of birth: 15 January 2008 (age 18)
- Place of birth: Bunclody, County Wexford, Ireland
- Height: 1.82 m (6 ft 0 in)
- Position: Defender

Team information
- Current team: Wexford
- Number: 25

Youth career
- Bunclody AFC
- 2019–2024: Wexford

Senior career*
Years	Team	Apps	(Gls)
2025–	Wexford	46	(0)

International career^{‡}
2025	Republic of Ireland U17	12	(0)
2026–	Republic of Ireland U19	6	(0)
- * Club domestic league appearances and goals as of 16:06, 11 November 2026 (UTC) ‡ National team caps and goals as of 16:05, 11 November 2026 (UTC)

Ryan Butler (born 15 January 2008) is an Irish professional footballer who plays as a defender for League of Ireland First Division club Wexford and represents the Republic of Ireland at youth international level.

Butler played youth football with Bunclody AFC before joining Wexford at age 11. He made his debut for the club in 2025 at the age of 17.

Butler has played at multiple age groups for the Republic of Ireland, including representing them at the FIFA U-17 World Cup.

== Club career ==
=== Wexford ===
On 4 April 2025, Butler made his senior debut for League of Ireland First Division club Wexford in a 3–1 win over Cobh Ramblers. On 27 June 2025, having played as a right-back all season, Butler was moved to centre-back in a game against Kerry where he made a goal line clearance in a game where he would be named man of the match.

On 25 January 2026, Butler signed a new deal with Wexford for the 2026 season.

== International career ==
On May 28, 2025, Butler was called up to the Republic of Ireland U17s for the first time. Butler was included in the squad that travelled to the 2025 FIFA U-17 World Cup. Butler played the full 90 minutes in all of Ireland's game at the tournament and scored the final penalty in Ireland's Penalty shoot-out against Canada which saw them progress to the Last 16.

On 20 March 2026, Butler was called up to the Republic of Ireland U19s for the first time.

== Career statistics ==
=== Club ===
As of match played 16 October 2026

Appearances and goals by club, season and competition
Club	Season	League			National cup (Note: Includes FAI Cup)		Other		Total	
Club	Season	Division	Apps	Goals	Apps	Goals	Apps	Goals	Apps	Goals
Wexford	2025	LOI First Division	21	0	0	0	2 (Note: Appearance in Leinster Senior Cup)	0	23	0
Wexford	2026	LOI First Division	25	0	1	0	2	0	28	0
Wexford	Total		46	0	1	0	4	0	51	0
Career total			46	0	1	0	4	0	51	0
