= Alber Castelau =

Argentine footballer (born 2009)

Personal information
- Full name: José Alberto Castelau de Roa
- Date of birth: 13 January 2009 (age 17)
- Place of birth: Getafe, Spain
- Height: 1.90 m (6 ft 3 in)
- Position: Goalkeeper

Team information
- Current team: Real Madrid

Youth career
- 2013–2017: Parla Escuela
- 2017–: Real Madrid

International career^{‡}
Years	Team	Apps	(Gls)
2024	Spain U15	1	(0)
2024	Argentina U15	1	(0)
2024–	Argentina U17	1	(0)
- ‡ National team caps and goals as of 30 May 2024

José Alberto Castelau de Roa (born 13 January 2009) is a professional footballer player who plays as a goalkeeper for La Liga side Real Madrid. Born in Spain, he represents Argentina at international level.

== Club career ==
As a youth player, Castelau joined the youth academy of Spanish side Parla Escuela. Following his stint there, he joined the youth academy of Spanish La Liga side Real Madrid at the age of eight.

== International career ==
Castelau was born in Spain to an Argentine father and Spanish mother, and holds dual citizenship. He is a Spain and Argentina youth international. During October 2024, he played for the Argentina national under-15 football team at the 2023 South American U-15 Championship.
