= Gerónimo Govea =

Bolivian footballer (born 2008)

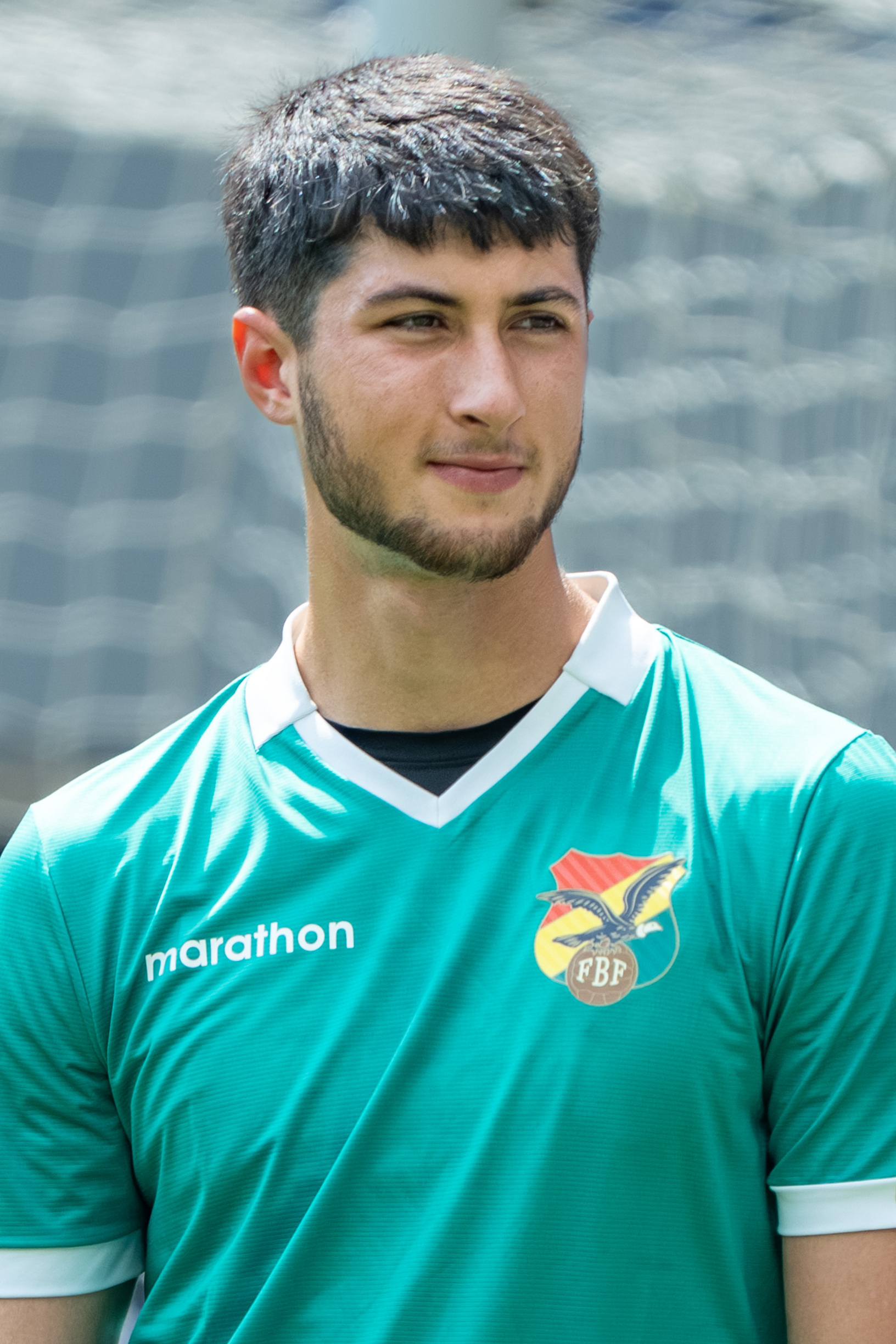
- Govea with Bolivia in 2026

Personal information
- Full name: Gerónimo Govea Herrera
- Date of birth: 10 April 2008 (age 18)
- Place of birth: Montevideo, Uruguay
- Height: 1.95 m (6 ft 5 in)
- Position: Goalkeeper

Team information
- Current team: Montevideo Wanderers
- Number: 1

Youth career
- 2020–: Montevideo Wanderers

Senior career*
Years	Team	Apps	(Gls)
2026–	Montevideo Wanderers	0	(0)

International career
2025	Bolivia U17	3	(0)
2026–	Bolivia	2	(0)
- * Club domestic league appearances and goals as of 00:15 (UTC) 1 Jan 2025

Gerónimo Govea Herrera (born 10 April 2008) is a professional footballer who plays as a goalkeeper for Montevideo Wanderers. Born in Uruguay, he plays for the Bolivia national team.

== Club career ==
Born in Montevideo, Uruguay to a Bolivian mother, his grandfather Adrian Herrera played football in Bolivia for Club Destroyers. He plays in the country for Montevideo Wanderers having joined the club at 12 years-old.

== International career ==
Herrera was born and raised in Montevideo, but is of Bolivian descent on his mother's side; she was born in Santa Cruz de la Sierra.

He represented Uruguay at under-15 level before playing age-group football for Bolivia from 2023. 1.95 metres tall by the age of 17 years-old, he made his debut playing for the Bolivia national under-17 football team in the opening match at the 2025 FIFA U-17 World Cup against South Africa U17 in Qatar, earning plaudits for his performances.

Having been called up to the senior Bolivia national football team in November 2025, he made his senior international debut for Bolivia against Peru in 2025. He continued with the national team the following year, playing a friendly match against Trinidad and Tobago on 15 March 2026, in a 3–0 win.
