= Íñigo Borgio =

Mexican footballer (born 2008)

Personal information
- Full name: Íñigo Borgio Cibrián
- Date of birth: 4 January 2008 (age 18)
- Place of birth: Mexico City, Mexico
- Height: 1.77 m (5 ft 10 in)
- Position: Midfielder

Team information
- Current team: Leganés

Youth career
- Leganés

International career^{‡}
Years	Team	Apps	(Gls)
2025–	Mexico U17	2	(0)
- ‡ National team caps and goals as of 7 September 2025

Íñigo Borgio Cibrián (born 4 January 2008) is a Mexican professional footballer who plays as a midfielder for Leganés.

== Club career ==
As a youth player, Borgio joined the youth academy of Spanish side Leganés.

== International career ==
Borgio is a Mexico youth international. During November 2025, he played for the Mexico national under-17 football team at the 2025 FIFA U-17 World Cup.

== Style of play ==
Borgio plays as a midfielder. Mexican newspaper Vanguardia wrote in 2025 that he "plays as a winger and striker, easily breaking lines thanks to his speed and power. His game is characterized by verticality and good ball striking".
