= Max-Edgar Chabot =

French footballer (born 2008)

Personal information
- Full name: Max-Edgar Henri Chabot
- Date of birth: 1 April 2008 (age 18)
- Place of birth: Les Sables-d'Olonne, France
- Height: 1.91 m (6 ft 3 in)
- Position: Goalkeeper

Team information
- Current team: Manchester City

Youth career
- 2014–2020: TVEC
- 2020–2023: Vendée Poiré
- 2023–2026: Angers
- 2026–: Manchester City

Senior career*
Years	Team	Apps	(Gls)
2024–2026	Angers B	4	(0)

International career^{‡}
2024	France U16	1	(0)
2025–	France U18	2	(0)
- * Club domestic league appearances and goals as of 17 August 2026 ‡ National team caps and goals as of 17 August 2026

Max-Edgar Chabot (born 1 April 2008) is a French professional footballer who plays as a goalkeeper for Manchester City Under-21s.

== Club career ==
Born in Les Sables-d'Olonne, Chabot is the son of the L'Île-d'Olonne mayor Fabrice Chabot.

He is a youth product of TVEC 85 Les Sables-d'Olonne and Vendée Poiré-sur-Vie, before joining the Ligue 1 club Angers SCO academy in 2023. There he started playing with the National 3 reserve team during the 2024–25 season, while also standing out with the club's under-19. He was however sidelined in the middle of the following season, after he refused to signe a long terme contract with the club.

In August 2026, he signed his first professional contract with Manchester City. He was described as the first footballer from Vendée to sign for a "European greats".

== International career ==
Chabot is a youth international for France, having played for the under-16 2024 and under-18 in 2025.

He was also called to the under-17 World Cup, where he acted as the reserve for starting goalkeeper Ilan Jourdren.
