= Henrry Díaz =

Venezuelan footballer (born 2008)

Personal information
- Full name: Henrry David Díaz Gamboa
- Date of birth: 3 March 2008 (age 18)
- Place of birth: Maturín, Venezuela
- Height: 1.67 m (5 ft 6 in)
- Position: Midfielder

Team information
- Current team: Monagas
- Number: 41

Youth career
- Monagas

Senior career*
| Years | Team | Apps | (Gls) |
| 2024– | Monagas | 3 | (0) |
| 2025– | → Monagas B (loan) | 8 | (2) |

International career^{‡}
| 2024 | Venezuela U15 | 4 | (0) |
| 2025– | Venezuela U17 | 8 | (0) |
- * Club domestic league appearances and goals as of 27 September 2025 ‡ National team caps and goals as of 29 June 2025

Henrry David Díaz Gamboa (born 3 March 2008) is a Venezuelan professional footballer who plays as a midfielder for Monagas.

== Club career ==
As a youth player, Díaz joined the youth academy of Monagas and was promoted to the club's senior team in 2025. Venezuelan newspaper Diario Meridiano wrote in 2025 that he was "positioned as one of the most exciting prospects in Venezuelan football" while playing for them.

== International career ==
Díaz is a Venezuela youth international. During March and April 2025, he played for the Venezuela national under-17 football team at the 2025 South American U-17 Championship.

== Style of play ==
Díaz plays as a midfielder. Left-footed, he is known for his passing and dribbling ability.
