= William Lodmell =

Soccer player (born 2008)

Personal information
- Full name: William Ibrahim Lodmell
- Date of birth: February 5, 2008 (age 18)
- Place of birth: Mexico City, Mexico
- Height: 1.89 m (6 ft 2 in)
- Position: Goalkeeper

Team information
- Current team: Sporting

Youth career
- River Plate
- Belenenses
- PSG Academy Miami
- Sporting

International career^{‡}
Years	Team	Apps	(Gls)
2025	United States U17	2	(0)
2026–	United States U18	2	(0)
2026–	United States U20	1	(0)
- ‡ National team caps and goals as of 31 March 2026

William Ibrahim Lodmell (born February 5, 2008) is a professional soccer player who plays as a goalkeeper for Portuguese club Sporting. Born in Mexico, he is a United States youth international.

== Early life ==
Lodmell was born in Mexico City to a Senegalese mother and an American father.

Lodmell spent the first six years of his life in Buenos Aires, Argentina, before relocating to Lisbon, Portugal.

== Club career ==
As a youth player, Lodmell started in River Plate and joined the youth academy of Portuguese side Belenenses at the age of six. Following his stint there, he joined the youth academy of American side PSG Academy Miami.

Subsequently, he joined the youth academy of Portuguese side Sporting. Senegalese news website Dsports.sn wrote in 2025 that he "quickly distinguished himself within the Sporting CP U13, then U14 and U15 teams" while playing for the club. In July 2025, he signed his first senior professional contract with Sporting, running through June 2028. During the 2025–26 season he made his senior competitive debut in the Liga Revelação, Portugal's top-tier under-23 competition.

In the 2026–27 season, he continued his senior development with Sporting CP's under-23 side in the Liga Next Gen. He is also a member of Sporting CP's UEFA Youth League squad for the 2026–27 season.

== International career ==
Lodmell is a United States youth international. He has represented the United States at youth level across U15, U17, and U18, including at the 2025 FIFA U-17 World Cup in Qatar. During the autumn of 2025, he was called up to the United States men's national under-17 soccer team for the 2025 FIFA U-17 World Cup. In July 2026, he was selected as one of three goalkeepers for the United States squad at the 2026 CONCACAF U-20 Championship in Mexico, a qualifying competition for the 2027 FIFA U-20 World Cup in Azerbaijan and Uzbekistan.
