= Milo Beimers =

Canadian soccer player (born 2008)

Personal information
- Full name: Milo Montgomery Beimers
- Date of birth: 5 June 2008 (age 18)
- Place of birth: Belfast, Northern Ireland
- Height: 1.88 m (6 ft 2 in)
- Position: Goalkeeper

Team information
- Current team: Viterbese

Youth career
- 2014: Castle Juniors
- 2020: Glentoran

Senior career*
Years	Team	Apps	(Gls)
2025–2026	Glentoran	0	(0)
2026–	Viterbese	10	(0)

International career^{‡}
	Northern Ireland U16	3	
2025	Canada U17	5	(0)
- * Club domestic league appearances and goals as of 7 November 2026 ‡ National team caps and goals as of 11 November 2025

Milo Montgomery Beimers (born 5 June 2008) is a soccer player who plays as a goalkeeper for Viterbese. Born in Northern Ireland, he is a youth international for Canada.

== Early life ==
Beimers was born on 5 June 2008. Born in Belfast, Northern Ireland, he is the son of Canadian video game developers Kevin & Aimee. Growing up, he attended Sullivan Upper School in Northern Ireland.

== Club career ==
As a youth player, Beimers joined the youth academy of Northern Irish side Castle Juniors. Following his time there, he joined the youth academy of Northern Irish side Glentoran, helping them win the 2025 Harry Cavan Youth Cup. In 2025, was promoted to the club's senior team while continuing to play for Glentoran Reserves.

In July 2026, Beimers chose to leave Northern Ireland to travel through Europe in a campervan with the hopes of finding a new club. In August 2026, Beimers signed for Italian side Viterbese who play in the fourth division of Italian Football.

He made his debut on the 6th of September, keeping a clean sheet in a 4-0 win over Anagni.

== International career ==
Beimers is a Canada youth international. During February 2025, he played for the Canada men's national under-17 soccer team for 2025 CONCACAF U-17 World Cup qualification.
