= Paul Scharner (footballer, born 2008) =

English-born Austrian footballer (born 2008)

Personal information
- Full name: Paul Pius Scharner
- Date of birth: 14 March 2008 (age 18)
- Place of birth: Wigan, England
- Height: 6 ft 4 in (1.93 m)
- Position: Goalkeeper

Team information
- Current team: Floridsdorfer AC
- Number: 1

Youth career
- 2014–2017: SV Wienerwald
- 2017–2019: FK Hagenbrunn
- 2019: SCU Kilb
- 2019–2021: SVg Purgstall
- 2021–2026: SKN St. Pölten

Senior career*
| Years | Team | Apps | (Gls) |
| 2026 | SKN St. Pölten | 0 | (0) |
| 2026– | Floridsdorfer AC | 5 | (0) |

International career^{‡}
| 2022 | Austria U15 | 1 | (0) |
| 2024 | Austria U16 | 2 | (0) |
| 2024–2025 | Austria U17 | 6 | (0) |
| 2026 | Austria U18 | 1 | (0) |
| 2026– | Austria U19 | 1 | (0) |
Medal record
Men's football
Representing Austria
FIFA U-17 World Cup
| Runner-up | 2025 Qatar |
- * Club domestic league appearances and goals as of 29 August 2026 ‡ National team caps and goals as of 31 March 2026

Paul Pius Scharner (born 14 March 2008) is a professional footballer who plays as a goalkeeper for 2. Liga club Floridsdorfer AC. Born in England, he represents Austria at youth level.

== Early life ==
Scharner was born on 14 March 2008 in Wigan, England, to former Austria international footballer Paul Scharner, who was playing for Wigan Athletic at the time.

== Club career ==
Scharner began his career at SV Wienerwald. He moved to FK Hagenbrunn for the 2017–18 season. In February 2019, he joined SCU Kilb. He joined SVg Purgstall for the 2019–20 season. For the 2021–22 season, he moved to AKA St. Pölten, where he progressed through all the age groups.

In January 2026, he joined second-division side SKN St. Pölten on loan. Although he was part of the professional squad at SKN, he only made appearances for the fourth-tier amateur side.

For the 2026–27 season, Scharner made a permanent move to second-division side Floridsdorfer AC, where he was offered a contract running until 2029. He made his 2. Liga debut in July 2026, when he was in the starting line-up against St. Pölten on the first matchday of that season.

== International career ==
An Austrian international at youth level from the U-15s onwards, Paul Scharner was called up to the Austrian U-17 squad to take part in the 2025 FIFA U-17 World Cup, which takes place in November 2025. Although he was a substitute during the tournament, he started in the final group match against New Zealand, which his team won 4–1.

Austria won 2–0 in the semi-final against Italy, featuring Samuele Inacio and Thomas Campaniello. Despite losing in the final to the reigning 2025 UEFA European U-17 Championship — the Portuguese side featuring Mateus Mide and Mauro Furtado — the Austrians’ run to their first-ever final was hailed as a remarkable achievement, given that they had never previously won a match in their two previous U-17 World Cup appearances.

== Honours ==
Austria U17

- FIFA U-17 World Cup runner-up: 2025
