= 2025 UEFA European Under-17 Championship qualification =

Tournament details
- Dates: Round 1: 9 October – 19 November 2024; Round 2: 7 March – 10 June 2025
- Teams: 54 (from 1 confederation)

Tournament statistics
- Matches played: 153
- Goals scored: 565 (3.69 per match)
- Top scorer(s): (Germany) Lennart Karl (7 goals)

The 2025 UEFA European Under-17 Championship qualification was a men's under-17 national football team competition that determined the 7 teams joining the automatically qualified hosts Albania in the 2025 UEFA European Under-17 Championship final tournament.

Russia were excluded from the tournament due to the ongoing invasion of Ukraine. Therefore, 54 teams entered this qualification competition including hosts Albania; this was the first time in the championship's history that the hosts took part in qualifying round despite being automatically qualified. The qualification consisted of a Round 1 played from October to November 2024, followed by a Round 2 played in spring 2025. Players born on or after 1 January 2008 were eligible to participate.

== Format ==
The qualifying competition consisted of the following two rounds:

- Round 1: 54 teams were drawn into 14 groups. Each group was played in a single round-robin format at one of the teams selected as hosts after the draw. The top two teams from each group advance to Round 2 of League A; the other teams played in Round 2 of League B.
- Round 2:
  - League A: 28 teams were drawn into 7 groups of four. The winners of each group qualified for the final tournament. If Albania was among the seven qualified teams, then the best runner-up team would also qualify.
  - League B: Teams in League B competed for promotion to League A for qualifying Round 1 of the 2026/27 under-19 Euro.

In addition, the qualification also acted as the UEFA qualifiers for the FIFA U-17 World Cup, with Round 1 being the first round and Round 2 League A being the final round of World Cup qualifying. The winners of each group in Round 2 League A, along with the four best second-placed teams, qualified for the 2025 FIFA U-17 World Cup.

=== Tiebreakers ===
In the qualifying rounds, teams were ranked according to points (3 points for a win, 1 point for a draw, 0 points for a loss), and if tied on points, the following tiebreaking criteria were applied, in the order given, to determine the rankings (Regulations Articles 14.01 and 14.02):

1. Points in head-to-head matches among tied teams;
2. Goal difference in head-to-head matches among tied teams;
3. Goals scored in head-to-head matches among tied teams;
4. If more than two teams were tied, and after applying all head-to-head criteria above, a subset of teams were still tied, all head-to-head criteria above were reapplied exclusively to this subset of teams;
5. Goal difference in all group matches;
6. Goals scored in all group matches;
7. Penalty shoot-out if only two teams had the same number of points, and they met in the last round of the group and were tied after applying all criteria above (not used if more than two teams had the same number of points, or if their rankings were not relevant for qualification for the next stage);
8. Disciplinary points (red card = 3 points, yellow card = 1 point, expulsion for two yellow cards in one match = 3 points);
9. UEFA coefficient ranking for the qualifying round draw;
10. Drawing of lots.

To determine the four best third-placed teams from the qualifying round, the results against the teams in fourth place were discarded. The following criteria were applied (Regulations Articles 15.01 and 15.03):

1. Points;
2. Goal difference;
3. Goals scored;
4. Disciplinary points (total 3 matches);
5. UEFA coefficient ranking for the qualifying round draw;
6. Drawing of lots.

To determine the seven best runners-up from the elite round, all results were considered. The same criteria as above were applied (Regulations Articles 15.02 and 15.03).

== Round 1 ==
=== Draw ===
The draw for the Round 1 was held on 3 May 2024 at the UEFA headquarters in Nyon, Switzerland.

The teams were seeded according to their coefficient ranking, calculated based on the following:

- 2018 UEFA European Under-17 Championship final tournament and qualifying competition (qualifying round and elite round)
- 2019 UEFA European Under-17 Championship final tournament and qualifying competition (qualifying round and elite round)
- 2022 UEFA European Under-17 Championship final tournament and qualifying competition (qualifying round and elite round)
- 2023 UEFA European Under-17 Championship final tournament and qualifying competition (qualifying round and elite round)

Each group contained one team from Pot A, one team from Pot B, one team from Pot C, and 12 groups contain one team from Pot D. Based on the decisions taken by the UEFA Emergency Panel, the following pairs of teams could not be drawn in the same group: Spain and Gibraltar, Belarus and Ukraine, Kosovo and Serbia, Kosovo and Bosnia and Herzegovina.

Teams entering qualifying round

Pot A
Team	Coeff.	Rank
Netherlands	28.000	1
France	25.389	2
Italy	25.111	3
Spain	23.667	4
Germany	20.833	5
Portugal	20.278	6
Belgium	18.444	7
England	17.456	8
Serbia	16.944	9
Republic of Ireland	16.000	10
Poland	14.333	11
Denmark	14.000	12
Hungary	13.944	13
Switzerland	13.778	14

Pot B
Team	Coeff.	Rank
**Sweden**	12.333	15
**Slovenia**	12.167	16
**Czech Republic**	12.056	17
**Norway**	11.556	18
**Israel**	11.000	19
Scotland	10.889	20
**Turkey**	10.278	21
Bosnia and Herzegovina	10.222	22
**Ukraine**	10.167	23
**Croatia**	9.667	24
**Greece**	9.389	25
**Iceland**	9.000	26
**Slovakia**	8.333	27
**Austria**	7.889	28

Pot C
Team	Coeff.	Rank
**Finland**	7.667	29
Belarus	6.667	30
Wales	6.444	31
Romania	6.000	32
Georgia	5.833	33
Bulgaria	5.556	34
Cyprus	5.433	35
Latvia	5.000	36
**Northern Ireland**	4.833	37
Montenegro	4.833	38
Luxembourg	4.583	39
Kosovo	4.333	40
Albania	4.333	41
North Macedonia	4.167	42

Pot D
Team	Coeff.	Rank
Estonia	3.333	43
Kazakhstan	2.667	44
Azerbaijan	2.000	45
Andorra	1.667	46
Lithuania	1.333	47
Moldova	1.000	48
Faroe Islands	0.000	49
Malta	0.000	50
Armenia	0.000	51
San Marino	0.000	52
Liechtenstein	0.000	53
Gibraltar	0.000	54

Notes

- Teams marked in **bold** qualified for the final tournament.

=== Groups ===
Round 1 was played from October to November 2024.

==== Group 1 ====
Pos	Team	Pld	W	D	L	GF	GA	GD	Pts	Qualification
1	England	3	3	0	0	12	2	+10	**9**	Round 2 League A
2	Sweden	3	2	0	1	9	5	+4	**6**	Round 2 League A
3	Latvia	3	1	0	2	5	7	−2	**3**	Round 2 League B
4	Malta (H)	3	0	0	3	1	13	−12	**0**	Round 2 League B

Source: UEFA
Rules for classification: Tiebreakers
(H) Hosts
24 October 2024
11:00

England	4–0	Malta
Ezenwata 12', 53'; Dowman 68'; Tyjon 90+4'	Report

Centenary Stadium, Ta' Qali
Attendance: 407
Referee: Florian Lata (Albania)
24 October 2024
14:30

Latvia	1–2	Sweden
Gomins 16'	Report	Saeed 33'; Brantlind 55'

Centenary Stadium, Ta' Qali
Attendance: 44
Referee: Georgi Ginchev (Bulgaria)

27 October 2024
11:00

England	4–0	Latvia
Rawlings 17'; Williams-Barnett 30'; Tyjon 34'; Howell 57'	Report

Centenary Stadium, Ta' Qali
Attendance: 120
Referee: Miloš Savović (Montenegro)
27 October 2024
14:30

Sweden	5–0	Malta
Öberg 9'; Brantlind 21', 77'; Pavey 73'; Arrhov 86'	Report

Centenary Stadium, Ta' Qali
Attendance: 332
Referee: Georgi Ginchev (Bulgaria)

30 October 2024
11:00

Malta	1–4	Latvia
Grech 13'	Report	Beķeris 5', 38'; Butriks 33'; Doroņins 85'

Centenary Stadium, Ta' Qali
Attendance: 187
Referee: Miloš Savović (Montenegro)
30 October 2024
14:30

Sweden	2–4	England
Saeed 26'; Hedlöf 90+3'	Report	Walsh 40'; Dike 47'; Gorman 74' (pen.); Dowman 90+1'

Centenary Stadium, Ta' Qali
Attendance: 116
Referee: Florian Lata (Albania)

==== Group 2 ====
Pos	Team	Pld	W	D	L	GF	GA	GD	Pts	Qualification
1	Poland	3	2	1	0	13	2	+11	**7**	Round 2 League A
2	Slovenia (H)	3	2	1	0	5	3	+2	**7**	Round 2 League A
3	Georgia	3	1	0	2	4	6	−2	**3**	Round 2 League B
4	Armenia	3	0	0	3	1	12	−11	**0**	Round 2 League B

Source: UEFA
Rules for classification: Tiebreakers
(H) Hosts
9 October 2024
15:30

Poland	8–0	Armenia
Karmelita 11', 41'; Siniawski 18', 30', 37'; Falkiewicz 39'; Skorb 70'; Delikat 85'	Report

Ptuj City Stadium, Ptuj
Attendance: 41
Referee: Roman Jitari (Moldova)
9 October 2024
15:30

Georgia	1–2	Slovenia
Bartishvili 31'	Report	Videnović 49'; Viher 51'

TŠC Trate, Gornja Radgona
Attendance: 220
Referee: Christos Vergetis (Greece)

12 October 2024
15:30

Poland	3–0	Georgia
Szywała 45+2', 57'; Czerniatowicz 63'	Report

Ptuj City Stadium, Ptuj
Attendance: 53
Referee: Cláudio Filipe Ruivo Pereira (Portugal)
12 October 2024
15:30

Slovenia	1–0	Armenia
Mlekuž 56'	Report

TŠC Trate, Gornja Radgona
Attendance: 240
Referee: Roman Jitari (Moldova)

15 October 2024
12:00

Slovenia	2–2	Poland
Meško 72' (pen.); Hočevar 90+1'	Report	Szywała 53'; Skorb 90+5'

Ptuj City Stadium, Ptuj
Attendance: 320
Referee: Cláudio Filipe Ruivo Pereira (Portugal)
15 October 2024
12:00

Armenia	1–3	Georgia
Simonian 76'	Report	Kobakhidze 5'; Bartishvili 57'; Kakashvili 90'

TŠC Trate, Gornja Radgona
Attendance: 27
Referee: Christos Vergetis (Greece)

==== Group 3 ====
Pos	Team	Pld	W	D	L	GF	GA	GD	Pts	Qualification
1	Croatia	3	2	1	0	11	2	+9	**7**	Round 2 League A
2	Netherlands	3	2	0	1	12	3	+9	**6**	Round 2 League A
3	Albania (H)	3	1	1	1	2	6	−4	**4**	Round 2 League B
4	Faroe Islands	3	0	0	3	0	14	−14	**0**	Round 2 League B

Source: UEFA
Rules for classification: Tiebreakers
(H) Hosts
9 October 2024
11:00

Netherlands	6–0	Faroe Islands
Ünüvar 31'; Neijenhuis 34'; Beerens 40', 66', 75'; Nash 90+1'	Report

Niko Dovana Stadium, Durrës
Referee: Lukasz Kuzma (Poland)
9 October 2024
15:00

Albania	1–1	Croatia
Kulla 66'	Report	Kurti 28' (o.g.)

Arena Kombëtare, Tirana
Referee: Zorbay Küçük (Türkiye)

12 October 2024
11:00

Croatia	7–0	Faroe Islands
Smiljanić 10'; P. Horvat 17', 63'; N. Horvat 40'; Mišura 55'; Vojvodić 76'; Kusanović 90+1'	Report

Arena Kombëtare, Tirana
Referee: Matthew MacDermid (Scotland)
12 October 2024
15:00

Netherlands	5–0	Albania
Wijks 11'; Ünüvar 21'; Ouarghi 59'; Nash 81'; Beerens 84'	Report

Arena Kombëtare, Tirana
Referee: Lukasz Kuzma (Poland)

15 October 2024
13:30

Croatia	3–1	Netherlands
P. Horvat 16'; Kusanović 22', 35'	Report	Acheampong 76'

Arena Kombëtare, Tirana
Referee: Zorbay Küçük (Türkiye)
15 October 2024
13:30

Faroe Islands	0–1	Albania
	Report	Kulla 57'

Egnatia Arena, Rrogozhinë
Referee: Matthew MacDermid (Scotland)

==== Group 4 ====
Pos	Team	Pld	W	D	L	GF	GA	GD	Pts	Qualification
1	Belgium (H)	3	3	0	0	7	3	+4	**9**	Round 2 League A
2	Ukraine	3	2	0	1	8	4	+4	**6**	Round 2 League A
3	Kosovo	3	0	1	2	7	10	−3	**1**	Round 2 League B
4	Kazakhstan	3	0	1	2	5	10	−5	**1**	Round 2 League B

Source: UEFA
Rules for classification: Tiebreakers
(H) Hosts
9 October 2024
14:00

Kosovo	2–4	Ukraine
Ahmeti 4'; Abdullahu 12'	Report	Zudin 16', 25'; Liusin 24', 62'

Cegeka Arena, Genk
Referee: Andreas Argyrou (Cyprus)
9 October 2024
19:00

Belgium	3–1	Kazakhstan
Muteba 38', 58'; Murenzi 49'	Report	Kaliev 78'

Académie Robert Louis-Dreyfus, Liège
Referee: Jacob Karlsen (Denmark)

12 October 2024
14:00

Ukraine	3–0	Kazakhstan
Andreyko 69'; Zalypka 72'; Dzhurabaiev 73'	Report

Kehrwegstadion, Eupen
Referee: Dalibor Černý (Czech Republic)
12 October 2024
19:00

Belgium	2–1	Kosovo
Muteba 8'; De Wannemacker 90'	Report	Abdullahu 90+5'

Cegeka Arena, Genk
Referee: Andreas Argyrou (Cyprus)

15 October 2024
15:00

Ukraine	1–2	Belgium
Zudin 59'	Report	Muteba 9'; Da Silva 90'

Cegeka Arena, Genk
Referee: Dalibor Černý (Czech Republic)
15 October 2024
15:00

Kazakhstan	4–4	Kosovo
Bekbolat 28' (pen.); Kenesbekov 37'; Toleukhan 53'; Satpayev 65'	Report	Ahmeti 49'; Abdullahu 52' (pen.), 79' (pen.); Shala 61'

Académie Robert Louis-Dreyfus, Liège
Referee: Jacob Karlsen (Denmark)

==== Group 5 ====
Pos	Team	Pld	W	D	L	GF	GA	GD	Pts	Qualification
1	Portugal (H)	3	3	0	0	19	3	+16	**9**	Round 2 League A
2	Finland	3	1	1	1	11	7	+4	**4**	Round 2 League A
3	Bosnia and Herzegovina	3	1	1	1	10	6	+4	**4**	Round 2 League B
4	Liechtenstein	3	0	0	3	0	24	−24	**0**	Round 2 League B

Source: UEFA
Rules for classification: Tiebreakers
(H) Hosts
13 November 2024
12:00

Portugal	10–0	Liechtenstein
Furtado 4'; Soares 10', 24', 60' (pen.); Mide 18', 32'; Quintas 37'; Baptista 38'; Pereira 86'; Neves 89'	Report

Estádio Nacional, Oeiras
Referee: Ben Mcmaster (Northern Ireland)
13 November 2024
16:00

Finland	2–2	Bosnia and Herzegovina
Katz 62' (pen.), 90'	Report	Delić 45+1'; Spahić 52'

Estádio do Real SC, Queluz
Referee: Marek Radina (Czech Republic)

16 November 2024
16:00

Portugal	5–1	Finland
Lima 6'; Neves 36'; Töllinen 42' (o.g.); Cunha 58'; Chelmik 75'	Report	Siren 20'

Cidade do Futebol, Oeiras
Referee: Kyriakos Athanasiou (Cyprus)
16 November 2024
18:30

Bosnia and Herzegovina	6–0	Liechtenstein
Subašić 33'; Ramić 35', 52'; Blagojević 58'; Ibrahimović 67'; Deket 85'	Report

Estádio Nacional, Oeiras
Referee: Ben Mcmaster (Northern Ireland)

19 November 2024
12:00

Bosnia and Herzegovina	2–4	Portugal
Ramić 17'; Vrban 33'	Report	Cabral 11', 74'; Manuel 70'; Pereira 77'

Cidade do Futebol, Oeiras
Referee: Kyriakos Athanasiou (Cyprus)
19 November 2024
12:00

Liechtenstein	0–8	Finland
	Report	Velásquez 2' (pen.), 54' (pen.); Töllinen 15'; Rantasalmi 28'; Katz 50', 67'; Tiitinen 90+1'; Lehtomäki 90+2'

Estádio Nacional, Oeiras
Referee: Marek Radina (Czech Republic)

==== Group 6 ====
Pos	Team	Pld	W	D	L	GF	GA	GD	Pts	Qualification
1	Greece	3	2	1	0	8	2	+6	**7**	Round 2 League A
2	Hungary	3	1	2	0	6	2	+4	**5**	Round 2 League A
3	Romania (H)	3	0	2	1	1	4	−3	**2**	Round 2 League B
4	Azerbaijan	3	0	1	2	1	8	−7	**1**	Round 2 League B

Source: UEFA
Rules for classification: Tiebreakers
(H) Hosts
13 November 2024
11:00

Hungary	4–0	Azerbaijan
Gólik 7'; Petrók 12'; Csóka 27'; Galambos 53'	Report

Tunari Stadium, Tunari
Referee: Ion Orlic (Moldova)
13 November 2024
11:00

Romania	0–3	Greece
	Report	Krommydas 35', 59'; Berdos 71'

Football Centre FRF, Buftea
Referee: Mohammad Usman Aslam (Norway)

16 November 2024
11:00

Hungary	0–0	Romania
	Report

Football Centre FRF, Buftea
Referee: Michele Beltrano (San Marino)
16 November 2024
11:00

Greece	3–0	Azerbaijan
Ioannou 47'; Souvlatzis 59'; Kapellas 71'	Report

Tunari Stadium, Tunari
Referee: Ion Orlic (Moldova)

19 November 2024
11:00

Greece	2–2	Hungary
Siozios 11'; Theocharis 48'	Report	Lakatos 31'; Labvas 45' (o.g.)

Tunari Stadium, Tunari
Referee: Mohammad Usman Aslam (Norway)
19 November 2024
11:00

Azerbaijan	1–1	Romania
Mahmudov 82'	Report	Coman 40'

Football Centre FRF, Buftea
Referee: Michele Beltrano (San Marino)

==== Group 7 ====
Pos	Team	Pld	W	D	L	GF	GA	GD	Pts	Qualification
1	Czech Republic	3	2	1	0	14	3	+11	**7**	Round 2 League A
2	Germany (H)	3	2	1	0	15	5	+10	**7**	Round 2 League A
3	Belarus	3	1	0	2	5	12	−7	**3**	Round 2 League B
4	Andorra	3	0	0	3	1	15	−14	**0**	Round 2 League B

Source: UEFA
Rules for classification: Tiebreakers
(H) Hosts
9 October 2024
11:00

Germany	4–0	Andorra
Staff 5'; Ünal 47'; Karl 70' (pen.); Güner 81'	Report

DFB-Campus, Frankfurt
Referee: Patrik Kolarić (Croatia)
9 October 2024
15:00

Belarus	0–3	Czech Republic
	Report	Novák 8'; Střeska 60'; Potměšil 87'

Sportpark Kelsterbach, Kelsterbach
Referee: Kevin O'Sullivan (Republic of Ireland)

12 October 2024
11:00

Germany	8–2	Belarus
Staff 15' (pen.), 45'; Karl 49', 57'; Creța 74'; Mule 77'; Mensah 79'; Göttlicher 89'	Report	Sakuta 39'; Zablotski 56'

Sportpark Kelsterbach, Kelsterbach
Referee: Jasmin Sabotic (Luxembourg)
12 October 2024
15:00

Czech Republic	8–0	Andorra
Jurásek 1'; Sochůrek 10'; Zajac 60', 80'; Potměšil 61', 79'; Graça De Almeida 89' (o.g.); Haddad Cuchiarelli 90+2' (o.g.)	Report

DFB-Campus, Frankfurt
Referee: Kevin O'Sullivan (Republic of Ireland)

15 October 2024
11:00

Czech Republic	3–3	Germany
Dominic 6' (o.g.); Potměšil 27'; Čížek 90+4' (pen.)	Report	Kaba 30'; Karl 32', 48'

DFB-Campus, Frankfurt
Referee: Patrik Kolarić (Croatia)
15 October 2024
11:00

Andorra	1–3	Belarus
Viana 38'	Report	Molchan 21'; Lutskovich 52'; Zablotski 55'

Sportpark Kelsterbach, Kelsterbach
Referee: Jasmin Sabotic (Luxembourg)

==== Group 8 ====
Pos	Team	Pld	W	D	L	GF	GA	GD	Pts	Qualification
1	Northern Ireland (H)	3	2	0	1	7	5	+2	**6**	Round 2 League A
2	Republic of Ireland	3	1	1	1	6	5	+1	**4 (Note: Ranked on disciplinary points: Republic of Ireland: –3, Lithuania: –5)**	Round 2 League A
3	Lithuania	3	1	1	1	6	5	+1	**4**	Round 2 League B
4	Scotland	3	1	0	2	3	7	−4	**3**	Round 2 League B

Source: UEFA
Rules for classification: Tiebreakers
(H) Hosts
Notes:
29 October 2024
13:00

Republic of Ireland	2–2	Lithuania
Lee 32'; M. Noonan 49'	Report	Mennea 79', 84'

Inver Park, Larne
Referee: Peiman Simani (Finland)
29 October 2024
16:00

Northern Ireland	3–1	Scotland
McGovern 19', 57'; McCann 50'	Report	Boyd 31'

Seaview Stadium, Belfast
Referee: Heini Ziskason Viðoy (Faroe Islands)

1 November 2024
13:00

Scotland	2–1	Lithuania
Boyd 25' (pen.); Hislop 41'	Report	Piazenko 74'

Seaview Stadium, Belfast
Referee: Peiman Simani (Finland)
1 November 2024
19:00

Republic of Ireland	1–3	Northern Ireland
M. Noonan 80'	Report	McDonagh 4' (o.g.); O'Neill 54'; McGrath 67'

Seaview Stadium, Belfast
Referee: Stefan Ebner (Austria)

4 November 2024
16:00

Scotland	0–3	Republic of Ireland
	Report	Martos 36'; M. Noonan 76' (pen.); Ogbonna 90+4'

Inver Park, Larne
Referee: Heini Ziskason Viðoy (Faroe Islands)
4 November 2024
16:00

Lithuania	3–1	Northern Ireland
Piazenko 12'; Grudzinskas 34' (pen.); Buikus 67'	Report	McGovern 90'

Seaview Stadium, Belfast
Referee: Stefan Ebner (Austria)

==== Group 9 ====
Pos	Team	Pld	W	D	L	GF	GA	GD	Pts	Qualification
1	Italy	3	3	0	0	16	0	+16	**9**	Round 2 League A
2	Norway	3	2	0	1	7	10	−3	**6**	Round 2 League A
3	Wales	3	1	0	2	9	8	+1	**3**	Round 2 League B
4	San Marino (H)	3	0	0	3	0	14	−14	**0**	Round 2 League B

Source: UEFA
Rules for classification: Tiebreakers
(H) Hosts
5 November 2024
11:00

Italy	5–0	San Marino
Reggiani 8'; Campaniello 33', 65'; Blini 70'; Damiano 74'	Report

Acquaviva Stadium, Acquaviva
Referee: Jovan Kachevski (North Macedonia)
5 November 2024
11:00

Wales	3–4	Norway
Bradbury 54' (pen.); Heywood 62'; Allmark 78'	Report	Holseter-Karlsen 10'; Krosa 22', 58'; Renshusløkken 50'

Stadio di Montecchio, Montecchio
Referee: Dmytro Panchyshyn (Ukraine)

8 November 2024
11:00

Italy	4–0	Wales
Blini 13'; Damiano 52'; Campaniello 84'; Inacio 90+1'	Report

Stadio di Montecchio, Montecchio
Referee: Dmytro Panchyshyn (Ukraine)
8 November 2024
11:00

Norway	3–0	San Marino
Krosa 10'; Woxen 38', 40'	Report

Acquaviva Stadium, Acquaviva
Referee: Ladislav Szikszay (Czech Republic)

11 November 2024
11:00

Norway	0–7	Italy
	Report	Campaniello 12', 24', 45+2'; Blini 16'; Inacio 41' (pen.); Wiafe 62'; Pirrò 67'

Stadio di Montecchio, Montecchio
Referee: Jovan Kachevski (North Macedonia)
11 November 2024
11:00

San Marino	0–6	Wales
	Report	Grainger 25', 27', 50'; Allmark 62'; Newman 80'; Dewsbury 84'

Acquaviva Stadium, Acquaviva
Referee: Ladislav Szikszay (Czech Republic)

==== Group 10 ====
Pos	Team	Pld	W	D	L	GF	GA	GD	Pts	Qualification
1	Switzerland	3	2	1	0	9	2	+7	**7**	Round 2 League A
2	Israel	3	1	2	0	7	3	+4	**5**	Round 2 League A
3	Montenegro	3	1	1	1	4	4	0	**4**	Round 2 League B
4	Moldova (H)	3	0	0	3	0	11	−11	**0**	Round 2 League B

Source: UEFA
Rules for classification: Tiebreakers
(H) Hosts
23 October 2024
13:00

Montenegro	1–1	Israel
Jovanović 88'	Report	Vokuje 78' (o.g.)

Zimbru-2 Stadium, Chișinău
Referee: Jóhan Hendrik Ellefsen (Faroe Islands)
23 October 2024
15:00

Switzerland	4–0	Moldova
Mijajlovic 25'; Llukes 34'; Bralic 41' (pen.); Scherrer 53'	Report

Nisporeni Central Stadium, Nisporeni
Referee: Joakim Östling (Sweden)

26 October 2024
12:00

Switzerland	3–0	Montenegro
Scherrer 23'; Bralic 72'; Cossalter 77'	Report

CSR Orhei, Orhei
Referee: Kamal Umudlu (Azerbaijan)
26 October 2024
12:00

Israel	4–0	Moldova
Ben Simon 49' (pen.); Avrevaya 67', 81'; Macarov 86' (o.g.)	Report

Zimbru-2 Stadium, Chișinău
Referee: Jóhan Hendrik Ellefsen (Faroe Islands)

29 October 2024
15:00

Israel	2–2	Switzerland
Avrevaya 51'; Chosyd 90+1'	Report	Despotovic 21'; Bralic 75'

Zimbru-2 Stadium, Chișinău
Referee: Joakim Östling (Sweden)
29 October 2024
15:00

Moldova	0–3	Montenegro
	Report	Jovanović 18'; Vukoje 22'; Anđić 79'

Nisporeni Central Stadium, Nisporeni
Referee: Kamal Umudlu (Azerbaijan)

==== Group 11 ====
Pos	Team	Pld	W	D	L	GF	GA	GD	Pts	Qualification
1	France	3	3	0	0	9	0	+9	**9**	Round 2 League A
2	Slovakia	3	2	0	1	10	3	+7	**6**	Round 2 League A
3	Cyprus (H)	3	1	0	2	8	5	+3	**3**	Round 2 League B
4	Gibraltar	3	0	0	3	0	19	−19	**0**	Round 2 League B

Source: UEFA
Rules for classification: Tiebreakers
(H) Hosts
29 October 2024
10:00

France	6–0	Gibraltar
Negre 9', 31', 65' (pen.); Himbert 50', 55'; Leccese 75'	Report

Sotira Municipal Stadium, Sotira
Referee: Pavle Ilić (Serbia)
29 October 2024
14:30

Cyprus	2–3	Slovakia
Kodaj 9' (o.g.); Mavroudis 28'	Report	Mateáš 4', 82'; Polťák 86'

Dasaki Stadium, Achna
Referee: Mikkel Redder (Denmark)

1 November 2024
10:00

Slovakia	7–0	Gibraltar
Polťák 11', 18', 86', 90+1'; Baravelli 32'; Fecso 45+1'; Pecsuk 67'	Report

Sotira Municipal Stadium, Sotira
Referee: Mihály Káprály (Hungary)
1 November 2024
14:30

France	2–0	Cyprus
Himbert 22'; Azizi 33'	Report

Dasaki Stadium, Achna
Referee: Mikkel Redder (Denmark)

4 November 2024
13:30

Slovakia	0–1	France
	Report	Leccese 62'

Sotira Municipal Stadium, Sotira
Referee: Mihály Káprály (Hungary)
4 November 2024
13:30

Gibraltar	0–6	Cyprus
	Report	E. Georgiou 8', 11', 90+2'; Kontopoulos 71' (pen.), 90+1'; O. Panayiotou 85'

Dasaki Stadium, Achna
Referee: Pavle Ilić (Serbia)

==== Group 12 ====
Pos	Team	Pld	W	D	L	GF	GA	GD	Pts	Qualification
1	Spain	3	2	1	0	11	2	+9	**7**	Round 2 League A
2	Iceland (H)	3	2	1	0	9	4	+5	**7**	Round 2 League A
3	North Macedonia	3	1	0	2	5	11	−6	**3**	Round 2 League B
4	Estonia	3	0	0	3	3	11	−8	**0**	Round 2 League B

Source: UEFA
Rules for classification: Tiebreakers
(H) Hosts
30 October 2024
14:00

Spain	4–0	Estonia
Flores 3'; Aicua 5'; Diaz 82'; Gistau 90'	Report

Thróttarvöllur, Reykjavík
Referee: Dmytro Kubriak (Ukraine)
30 October 2024
18:00

North Macedonia	1–4	Iceland
Markovski 90+3'	Report	Sævarsson 30'; Olsen 38'; Kristjánsson 62'; Dadason 71'

Thróttarvöllur, Reykjavík
Referee: Mohammed Al-emara (Finland)

2 November 2024
14:00

Spain	5–0	North Macedonia
Campos 21'; Nomoko 25' (pen.), 75'; Barreiros 28'; Gistau 85'	Report

Thróttarvöllur, Reykjavík
Referee: Antoine Chiaramonti (Andorra)
2 November 2024
18:00

Iceland	3–1	Estonia
Jóhannsson 21'; Arnarsson 53'; Sævarsson 60'	Report	Kalmõkov 90+5'

Thróttarvöllur, Reykjavík
Referee: Dmytro Kubriak (Ukraine)

5 November 2024
14:00

Estonia	2–4	North Macedonia
Alamaa 56'; Paalberg 90+1'	Report	Grashevski 19'; Brankovski 28', 45+2', 76'

Thróttarvöllur, Reykjavík
Referee: Antoine Chiaramonti (Andorra)
5 November 2024
18:00

Iceland	2–2	Spain
Guðjónsson 33'; Olsen 83'	Report	Barreiros 37'; Iglesias 63'

Thróttarvöllur, Reykjavík
Referee: Mohammed Al-emara (Finland)

==== Group 13 ====
Pos	Team	Pld	W	D	L	GF	GA	GD	Pts	Qualification
1	Serbia (H)	2	1	1	0	3	1	+2	**4**	Round 2 League A
2	Turkey	2	1	1	0	2	1	+1	**4**	Round 2 League A
3	Bulgaria	2	0	0	2	0	3	−3	**0**	Round 2 League B

Source: UEFA
Rules for classification: Tiebreakers
(H) Hosts
1 November 2024
17:00

Bulgaria	0–2	Serbia
	Report	Kostov 30', 90+2'

Serbian FA Sports Center, Stara Pazova
Referee: Igor Stojchevski (North Macedonia)

4 November 2024
13:00

Turkey	1–0	Bulgaria
Çobanoğlu 13'	Report

Serbian FA Sports Center, Stara Pazova
Referee: Marc Nagtegaal (The Netherlands)

7 November 2024
17:00

Serbia	1–1	Turkey
Petrović 61'	Report	Yortaç 34'

Serbian FA Sports Center, Stara Pazova
Referee: Martin Matoša (Slovenia)

==== Group 14 ====
Pos	Team	Pld	W	D	L	GF	GA	GD	Pts	Qualification
1	Austria	2	1	1	0	2	1	+1	**4**	Round 2 League A
2	Denmark (H)	2	1	0	1	3	1	+2	**3**	Round 2 League A
3	Luxembourg	2	0	1	1	1	4	−3	**1**	Round 2 League B

Source: UEFA
Rules for classification: Tiebreakers
(H) Hosts
9 October 2024
16:00

Luxembourg	0–3	Denmark
	Report	Ambæk 19', 44', 53'

Kolding Stadium, Kolding
Referee: Danilo Nikolić (Serbia)

12 October 2024
14:00

Austria	1–1	Luxembourg
Dobis 23'	Report	Da Silva Fernandes 56'

Mosevej Stadion, Kolding
Referee: Marek Radina (Czech Republic)

15 October 2024
15:00

Denmark	0–1	Austria
	Report	Moser 58'

Haderslev Stadium, Haderslev
Referee: Tom Owen (Wales)

== Round 2 ==
=== Draw ===
The draw for Round 2 was made at 11:45 CET on 5 December at the UEFA headquarters in Nyon, Switzerland.

The 28 teams of Round 1 (top 2 of each group) were drawn in seven groups of four teams. The seven teams ranked fourth in the League A groups were relegated to League B for Round 1 of U19 EURO qualifying for the same age cohort (so teams relegated from League A in 2024/25 under-17 Euro Round 2 began 2026/27 under-19 Euro Round 1 in League B).

The teams were seeded according to their results in Round 1 (Regulations Article 15.01).

Teams entering League A

2024/25 qualifying round results

Pot 1
Team	Pos.	Pts.	GD	GS
Italy	Group 9 winners	6	11	11
Portugal	Group 5 winners	6	6	9
England	Group 1 winners	6	6	8
France	Group 11 winners	6	3	3
Belgium	Group 4 winners	6	2	4
Spain	Group 12 winners	4	5	7
Czech Republic	Group 7 winners	4	3	6

Pot 2
Team	Pos.	Pts.	GD	GS
Switzerland	Group 10 winners	4	3	5
Poland	Group 2 winners	4	3	5
Greece	Group 6 winners	4	3	5
Croatia	Group 3 winners	4	2	4
Serbia	Group 13 winners	4	2	3
Austria	Group 14 winners	4	1	2
Northern Ireland	Group 8 winners	3	0	4

2024/25 qualifying round results

Pot 3
Team	Pos.	Pts.	GD	GS
Germany	Group 7 runner-up	4	6	11
Iceland	Group 12 runner-up	4	3	6
Slovenia	Group 2 runner-up	4	1	4
Turkey	Group 13 runner-up	4	1	2
Netherlands	Group 3 runner-up	3	3	6
Denmark	Group 14 runner-up	3	2	3
Ukraine	Group 4 runner-up	3	1	5

Pot 4
Team	Pos.	Pts.	GD	GS
Slovakia	Group 11 runner-up	3	0	3
Sweden	Group 1 runner-up	3	-1	4
Norway	Group 9 runner-up	3	-6	4
Israel	Group 10 runner-up	2	0	3
Hungary	Group 6 runner-up	2	0	2
Republic of Ireland	Group 8 runner-up	1	-2	3
Finland	Group 5 runner-up	1	-4	3

Teams entering League B

The third and fourth-placed teams in Round 1 entered League B. The teams were seeded according to their results in Round 1 into five groups of four and two groups of three teams. The seven League B winners were promoted to League A for Round 1 of 2026/27 U19 EURO qualifying.

2024/25 qualifying round results

Pot 1
Team	Pos.	Pts.	GD	GS
Lithuania	Third Group 8	4	2	5
Bosnia and Herzegovina	Third Group 5	1	-2	4
Montenegro	Third Group 10	1	-3	1
Luxembourg	Third Group 14	1	-3	1
Romania	Third Group 6	1	-3	0
Albania	Third Group 3	1	-5	1
Kosovo	Third Group 4	0	-3	3

Pot 2
Team	Pos.	Pts.	GD	GS
Cyprus	Third Group 11	0	-3	2
Bulgaria	Third Group 13	0	-3	0
Georgia	Third Group 2	0	-4	1
Wales	Third Group 9	0	-5	3
Latvia	Third Group 1	0	-5	1
North Macedonia	Third Group 12	0	-8	1
Belarus	Third Group 7	0	-9	2

2024/25 qualifying round results

Pot 3
Team	Pos.	Pts.	GD	GS
Scotland	Fourth Group 8	3	-4	3
Kazakhstan	Fourth Group 4	1	-5	5
Azerbaijan	Fourth Group 6	1	-7	1
Estonia	Fourth Group 12	0	-8	3
Armenia	Fourth Group 2	0	-11	1
Moldova	Fourth Group 10	0	-11	0
Malta	Fourth Group 1	0	-12	1

Pot 4
Team	Pos.	Pts.	GD	GS
Andorra	Fourth Group 7	0	-14	1
San Marino	Fourth Group 9	0	-14	0
Faroe Islands	Fourth Group 3	0	-14	0
Gibraltar	Fourth Group 11	0	-19	0
Liechtenstein	Fourth Group 5	0	-24	0

=== League A ===
Times are CET/CEST, (Note: CET (UTC+1) for dates up to 26 March 2023, and CEST (UTC+2) for dates thereafter.) as listed by UEFA (local times, if different, are in parentheses).

==== Group A1 ====
Pos	Team	Pld	W	D	L	GF	GA	GD	Pts	Promotion
1	Italy	3	3	0	0	5	2	+3	9	Qualified for the final tournament and 2025 FIFA U-17 World Cup
2	Croatia (H)	3	2	0	1	5	4	+1	6	Qualified for the 2025 FIFA U-17 World Cup
3	Ukraine	3	1	0	2	3	4	−1	3	
4	Slovakia	3	0	0	3	1	4	−3	0	Relegated to League B for the Round 1 of the 2027 UEFA European Under-19 Championship qualification

Source: UEFA
Rules for classification: Qualification tiebreakers
(H) Hosts
19 March 2025
12:00

Ukraine	1–2	Croatia
Liusin 55' (pen.)	Report	Kusanović 22', 31'

Stadion Branko Čavlović-Čavlek, Karlovac
Referee: Mathieu Vernice (France)
19 March 2025
15:30

Italy	1–0	Slovakia
Luongo 6'	Report

Sv. Josip Radnik, Sesvete
Referee: Stefan Ebner (Austria)

22 March 2025
12:00

Italy	2–1	Ukraine
Mambuku 90'; Elimoghale 90+2'	Report	Bovio 28' (o.g.)

Stadion Lučko, Lučko
Referee: Gal Levi (Israel)
22 March 2025
15:30

Croatia	2–1	Slovakia
N. Horvat 32'; P. Horvat 56' (pen.)	Report	Mateas 49'

Stadion Branko Čavlović-Čavlek, Karlovac
Referee: Stefan Ebner (Austria)

25 March 2025
15:30

Slovakia	0–1	Ukraine
	Report	Liusin 90'

Sv. Josip Radnik, Sesvete
Referee: Gal Levi (Israel)
26 March 2025
12:00

Croatia	1–2	Italy
Bentokić 64'	Report	Reggiani 44'; Elimoghale 89'

Stadion Lučko, Lučko
Referee: Mathieu Vernice (France)

==== Group A2 ====
Pos	Team	Pld	W	D	L	GF	GA	GD	Pts	Promotion
1	Germany	3	2	1	0	9	5	+4	7	Qualified for the final tournament and 2025 FIFA U-17 World Cup
2	Austria	3	1	2	0	7	6	+1	5	Qualified for the 2025 FIFA U-17 World Cup
3	Spain (H)	3	1	1	1	7	7	0	4	
4	Norway	3	0	0	3	3	8	−5	0	Relegated to League B for the Round 1 of the 2027 UEFA European Under-19 Championship qualification

Source: UEFA
Rules for classification: Qualification tiebreakers
(H) Hosts
19 March 2025
16:00

Germany	2–2	Austria
Mensah 72'; Staff 73'	Report	Deshishku 16', 22'

Estadio Romano, Mérida
Referee: Florian Lata (Albania)
19 March 2025
18:00

Spain	2–1	Norway
Pedro Rodríguez 44'; Durá 81'	Report	Mengshoel 89'

Estadio Francisco de la Hera, Almendralejo
Referee: Ben Mcmaster (Northern Ireland)

22 March 2025
16:00

Austria	2–1	Norway
Feldinger 31'; Dobis 72'	Report	Slørdal 7'

Estadio Romano, Mérida
Referee: Alexandros Tsakalidis (Greece)
22 March 2025
18:00

Spain	2–3	Germany
T. Fernández 67'; Oyono 70'	Report	Staff 50'; Karl 63'; Oteng-Mensah 90+2'

Estadio Francisco de la Hera, Almendralejo
Referee: Ben Mcmaster (Northern Ireland)

25 March 2025
18:00

Austria	3–3	Spain
Moser 43' (pen.); Dobis 56', 62'	Report	Oyono 17'; Alves 67'; Quintero 71'

Estadio Romano, Mérida
Referee: Florian Lata (Albania)
25 March 2025
18:00

Norway	1–4	Germany
Krosa 90+3'	Report	Mule 5'; Karl 27'; Staff 35'; Oteng-Mesiah 90+1' (pen.)

Estadio Francisco de la Hera, Almendralejo
Referee: Alexandros Tsakalidis (Greece)

==== Group A3 ====
Pos	Team	Pld	W	D	L	GF	GA	GD	Pts	
1	France (H)	3	3	0	0	13	2	+11	9	Qualified for the final tournament and 2025 FIFA U-17 World Cup
2	Finland	3	1	0	2	6	9	−3	3 (Note: Head-to-head goal difference: Finland +1; Greece 0; Denmark −1.)	
3	Greece	3	1	0	2	5	9	−4	3	
4	Denmark	3	1	0	2	6	10	−4	3	Relegated to League B for the Round 1 of the 2027 UEFA European Under-19 Championship qualification

Source: UEFA
Rules for classification: Qualification tiebreakers
(H) Hosts
Notes:
19 March 2025
15:00

France	4–0	Finland
Eymard 45+1', 56'; Azizi 66'; Nguessan 72'	Report

Stade André Darrigade, Dax
Referee: Rares Vidican (Romania)
19 March 2025
18:00

Denmark	3–1	Greece
Panduro 10'; Al-Najar 65'; Pimpong 90'	Report	Souvlatzis 71'

Plaine des Sports, Saint-Paul-lès-Dax
Referee: Oguzhan Çakir (Türkiye)

22 March 2025
15:00

France	4–1	Denmark
Azizi 22'; Nguessan 28', 36'; Mbaye 52'	Report	Ambæk 31'

Plaine des Sports, Saint-Paul-lès-Dax
Referee: Dalibor Černý (Czechia)
22 March 2025
18:00

Greece	3–1	Finland
Ioannou 33', 53'; Nempis 57'	Report	Rantasalmi 11'

Plaine des Sports, Saint-Paul-lès-Dax
Referee: Rares Vidican (Romania)

25 March 2025
16:00

Greece	1–5	France
Nempis 5'	Report	N'Guessan 9', 62'; Azizi 59'; Ameline 73'; S. Camara 88'

Stade André Darrigade, Dax
Referee: Oguzhan Çakir (Türkiye)
25 March 2025
16:00

Finland	5–2	Denmark
Okungbowa 50', 88'; Søndenbroe 61' (o.g.); Katz 64', 76' (pen.)	Report	Pimpong 20'; Fuglsang 45+1'

Stade André Darrigade, Dax
Referee: Dalibor Černý (Czechia)

==== Group A4 ====
Pos	Team	Pld	W	D	L	GF	GA	GD	Pts	
1	Portugal (H)	3	3	0	0	8	2	+6	9	Qualified for the final tournament and 2025 FIFA U-17 World Cup
2	Serbia	3	1	1	1	3	4	−1	4	
3	Hungary	3	0	2	1	3	5	−2	2	
4	Netherlands	3	0	1	2	3	6	−3	1	Relegated to League B for the Round 1 of the 2027 UEFA European Under-19 Championship qualification

Source: UEFA
Rules for classification: Qualification tiebreakers
(H) Hosts
19 March 2025
12:00

Netherlands	0–1	Serbia
	Report	Zarić 47'

Pista de Atletismo Gémeos Castro, Guimaraes
Referee: Kevin O'Sullivan (Republic of Ireland)
19 March 2025
16:00

Portugal	2–0	Hungary
Neves 38'; Cabral 60'	Report

Cidade Desportiva do SC Braga, Braga
Referee: Mikkel Redder (Denmark)

22 March 2025
12:00

Serbia	1–1	Hungary
Soprenić 84'	Report	Galambos 68'

Centro Treinos Campo 1, Barcelos
Referee: Kevin O'Sullivan (Republic of Ireland)
22 March 2025
17:00

Portugal	3–1	Netherlands
Cabral 36'; Furtado 41'; Lima 43'	Report	Neijenhuis 86'

Estádio do FC Vizela, Vizela
Referee: Ross Hardie (Scotland)

25 March 2025
16:00

Serbia	1–3	Portugal
Damjanović 85'	Report	Neves 43'; Pereira 79'; Anísio 89'

Estádio Cidade de Barcelos, Barcelos
Referee: Ross Hardie (Scotland)
25 March 2025
16:00

Hungary	2–2	Netherlands
Galambos 26'; Gólik 50'	Report	Beerens 61'; Bouhoudane 79'

Estádio Municipal de Fafe, Fafe
Referee: Mikkel Redder (Denmark)

==== Group A5 ====
Pos	Team	Pld	W	D	L	GF	GA	GD	Pts	Promotion
1	Czech Republic	3	2	1	0	7	4	+3	7	Qualified for the final tournament and 2025 FIFA U-17 World Cup
2	Switzerland (H)	3	2	0	1	5	5	0	6	Qualified for the 2025 FIFA U-17 World Cup
3	Sweden	3	1	0	2	6	4	+2	3	
4	Turkey	3	0	1	2	3	8	−5	1	Relegated to League B for the Round 1 of the 2027 UEFA European Under-19 Championship qualification

Source: UEFA
Rules for classification: Qualification tiebreakers
(H) Hosts
19 March 2025
13:30

Turkey	2–3	Switzerland
Ertem 43' (pen.); Akdoğan 65'	Report	Lazri 45+3'; Llukes 48', 69' (pen.)

Esp Stadium, Baden
Referee: Oliver Reitala (Finland)
19 March 2025
19:30

Czech Republic	3–2	Sweden
Potměšil 28'; Čížek 34'; Křivánek 82'	Report	Van Der Laan 11'; Brantlind 36'

Esp Stadium, Baden
Referee: João Gonçalves (Portugal)

22 March 2025
12:00

Czech Republic	1–1	Turkey
Novák 45'	Report	Akdoğan 17'

Esp Stadium, Baden
Referee: Matthias Jöllenbeck (Germany)
22 March 2025
18:00

Switzerland	1–0	Sweden
Llukes 14'	Report

Esp Stadium, Baden
Referee: João Gonçalves (Portugal)

25 March 2025
18:30

Switzerland	1–3	Czech Republic
Bruchez 9'	Report	Čížek 23' (pen.), 38' (pen.); Škrkoň 90+3'

Esp Stadium, Baden
Referee: Oliver Reitala (Finland)
25 March 2025
18:30

Sweden	4–0	Turkey
Arrhov 16'; Bergkvall 44'; Pavey 89'; Öberg 90+2'	Report

Bergholz, Wil
Referee: Matthias Jöllenbeck (Germany)

==== Group A6 ====
Pos	Team	Pld	W	D	L	GF	GA	GD	Pts	Promotion
1	Belgium	3	2	1	0	5	3	+2	7	Qualified for the final tournament and 2025 FIFA U-17 World Cup
2	Republic of Ireland	3	2	0	1	7	1	+6	6	Qualified for the 2025 FIFA U-17 World Cup
3	Poland (H)	3	0	2	1	3	5	−2	2	
4	Iceland	3	0	1	2	2	8	−6	1	Relegated to League B for the Round 1 of the 2027 UEFA European Under-19 Championship qualification

Source: UEFA
Rules for classification: Qualification tiebreakers
(H) Hosts
19 March 2025
14:00

Belgium	1–0	Republic of Ireland
Fernandez 54' (pen.)	Report

Stadion Miejski im. Karola Kucharskiego, Gryfice
Referee: Seth Galia (Gibraltar)
19 March 2025
14:00

Iceland	1–1	Poland
Kristjánsson 90' (pen.)	Report	Karmelita 29'

Baltyk Koszalin, Koszalin
Referee: Dmytro Kubriak (Ukraine)

22 March 2025
14:00

Belgium	2–1	Iceland
De Wannemacker 51'; De Cat 82'	Report	Arnarsson 70'

Stadion Miejski im. Karola Kucharskiego, Gryfice
Referee: Danilo Nikolić (Serbia)
22 March 2025
14:00

Poland	0–2	Republic of Ireland
	Report	Umeh 71', 77'

Baltyk Koszalin, Koszalin
Referee: Seth Galia (Gibraltar)

25 March 2025
14:00

Poland	2–2	Belgium
Gmur 33'; Delikat 60' (pen.)	Report	De Cat 64'; Fernandez 84'

Baltyk Koszalin, Koszalin
Referee: Dmytro Kubriak (Ukraine)
25 March 2025
14:00

Republic of Ireland	5–0	Iceland
Umeh 14', 57'; Canny 32'; Sherlock 77' (pen.); Akinrintoyo 87'	Report

Stadion Miejski im. Karola Kucharskiego, Gryfice
Referee: Danilo Nikolić (Serbia)

==== Group A7 ====
Pos	Team	Pld	W	D	L	GF	GA	GD	Pts	Promotion
1	England (H)	3	3	0	0	10	2	+8	9	Qualified for the final tournament and 2025 FIFA U-17 World Cup
2	Slovenia	3	1	1	1	4	4	0	4	
3	Israel	3	1	0	2	1	3	−2	3	
4	Northern Ireland	3	0	1	2	1	7	−6	1	Relegated to League B for the Round 1 of the 2027 UEFA European Under-19 Championship qualification

Source: UEFA
Rules for classification: Qualification tiebreakers
(H) Hosts
19 March 2025
16:00

England	2–0	Israel
Rodriguez 25', 60'	Report

St George's Park National Football Centre, Burton upon Trent
Referee: Karel Rouček (Czechia)
19 March 2025
20:00

Slovenia	1–1	Northern Ireland
Jereb 86' (pen.)	Report	Savage 77' (pen.)

St George's Park National Football Centre, Burton upon Trent
Referee: Jasmin Sabotic (Luxembourg)

22 March 2025
16:00

England	3–2	Slovenia
Simmonds 3'; McAidoo 10'; Rodriguez 84'	Report	Kozar 16'; Videnović 75'

St George's Park National Football Centre, Burton upon Trent
Referee: Jasmin Sabotic (Luxembourg)
22 March 2025
20:00

Northern Ireland	0–1	Israel
	Report	Lusky 90'

St George's Park National Football Centre, Burton upon Trent
Referee: Patryk Gryckiewicz (Poland)

25 March 2025
20:00

Northern Ireland	0–5	England
	Report	Gorman 7', 26'; Ngumoha 19', 64'; Dowman 30'

St George's Park National Football Centre, Burton upon Trent
Referee: Karel Rouček (Czechia)
25 March 2025
20:00

Israel	0–1	Slovenia
	Report	Ceferin 70'

St George's Park National Football Centre, Burton upon Trent
Referee: Patryk Gryckiewicz (Poland)

=== Ranking of second-placed teams ===
Pos	Grp	Team	Pld	W	D	L	GF	GA	GD	Pts	Qualification
1	A6	Republic of Ireland	3	2	0	1	7	1	+6	6	Qualified for the 2025 FIFA U-17 World Cup
2	A1	Croatia	3	2	0	1	5	4	+1	6	Qualified for the 2025 FIFA U-17 World Cup
3	A5	Switzerland	3	2	0	1	5	5	0	6	Qualified for the 2025 FIFA U-17 World Cup
4	A2	Austria	3	1	2	0	7	6	+1	5	Qualified for the 2025 FIFA U-17 World Cup
5	A7	Slovenia	3	1	1	1	4	4	0	4	
6	A4	Serbia	3	1	1	1	3	4	−1	4	
7	A3	Finland	3	1	0	2	6	9	−3	3	

Source: UEFA
Rules for classification: 1) points; 2) goal difference; 3) goals scored; 4) disciplinary points; 5) coefficient ranking.

=== League B ===
==== Group B1 ====
Pos	Team	Pld	W	D	L	GF	GA	GD	Pts	Promotion
1	Scotland (H)	3	2	1	0	12	2	+10	7	Promoted to League A for the Round 1 of the 2027 UEFA European Under-19 Championship qualification
2	Romania	3	2	0	1	13	2	+11	6	
3	North Macedonia	3	1	1	1	3	5	−2	4	
4	Liechtenstein	3	0	0	3	0	19	−19	0	

Source: UEFA
Rules for classification: Qualification tiebreakers
(H) Hosts
19 March 2025
12:00

Romania	10–0	Liechtenstein
Ninaci 12'; Țăroi 33', 63'; Bota 37'; Banu 40'; Ungureanu 68'; Cojocariu 83'; Avramescu 89', 90+1'; Radu 90+4'	Report

Broadwood Stadium, Cumbernauld
Referee: Bence Csonka (Hungary)
19 March 2025
16:30

Scotland	2–2	North Macedonia
Boyd 52'; Hogarth 80'	Report	Markoski 40'; Zhaku 83'

Broadwood Stadium, Cumbernauld
Referee: Matteo Marchetti (Italy)

22 March 2025
16:30

North Macedonia	1–0	Liechtenstein
Hodja 30'	Report

Broadwood Stadium, Cumbernauld
Referee: Bence Csonka (Hungary)
22 March 2025
20:30

Romania	0–2	Scotland
	Report	Borland 53'; Masson 90'

Broadwood Stadium, Cumbernauld
Referee: Sven Wolfensberger (Switzerland)

25 March 2025
16:00

North Macedonia	0–3	Romania
	Report	Radu 25', 90+6'; Ninaci 45'

Broadwood Stadium, Cumbernauld
Referee: Matteo Marchetti (Italy)
25 March 2025
16:00

Liechtenstein	0–8	Scotland
	Report	Smith 1'; Burke 10', 47', 57'; Boyd 12'; Williams 29', 36'; Dair 79' (pen.)

Falkirk Stadium, Falkirk
Referee: Sven Wolfensberger (Switzerland)

==== Group B2 ====
Pos	Team	Pld	W	D	L	GF	GA	GD	Pts	Promotion
1	Bosnia and Herzegovina (H)	3	3	0	0	10	1	+9	9	Promoted to League A for the Round 1 of the 2027 UEFA European Under-19 Championship qualification
2	Belarus	3	2	0	1	6	2	+4	6	
3	Armenia	3	1	0	2	1	7	−6	3	
4	San Marino	3	0	0	3	0	7	−7	0	

Source: UEFA
Rules for classification: Qualification tiebreakers
(H) Hosts
12 May 2025
14:00

Bosnia and Herzegovina	5–0	San Marino
Mehmedović 28', 48'; Vrban 33', 60'; Deket 79'	Report

Stadium Etno Selo Stanišići, Bijeljina
Referee: Roman Jitari (Moldova)
12 May 2025
14:00

Belarus	4–0	Armenia
Kalesnikovich 18'; Lutskovich 29', 31'; Yastachkin 81'	Report

Ugljevik City Stadium, Ugljevik
Referee: Oscar Johnson (Sweden)

15 May 2025
14:00

Bosnia and Herzegovina	3–0	Armenia
Mehmedović 57'; Vrban 73'; Deket 77'	Report

Stadium Etno Selo Stanišići, Bijeljina
Referee: Márton Rús (Hungary)
15 May 2025
14:00

Belarus	1–0	San Marino
Stefani 73' (o.g.)	Report

Ugljevik City Stadium, Ugljevik
Referee: Roman Jitari (Moldova)

18 May 2025
14:00

Belarus	1–2	Bosnia and Herzegovina
Verenich 90+6'	Report	Mehmedović 5'; Ramić 63'

Ugljevik City Stadium, Ugljevik
Referee: Márton Rús (Hungary)
18 May 2025
14:00

San Marino	0–1	Armenia
	Report	Arakelyan 83'

Stadium Etno Selo Stanišići, Bijeljina
Referee: Oscar Johnson (Sweden)

==== Group B3 ====
Pos	Team	Pld	W	D	L	GF	GA	GD	Pts	Promotion
1	Estonia	2	2	0	0	4	1	+3	6	Promoted to League A for the Round 1 of the 2027 UEFA European Under-19 Championship qualification
2	Montenegro (H)	2	1	0	1	4	3	+1	3	
3	Latvia	2	0	0	2	0	4	−4	0	
4	Gibraltar	0	0	0	0	0	0	0	0	Withdrew

Source: UEFA
Rules for classification: Qualification tiebreakers
(H) Hosts
4 June 2025
19:00

Estonia	3–1	Montenegro
Paalberg 20' (pen.), 75'; Mägi 65'	Report	Lesjak 45+3'

Stadion Tuško Polje, Tuzi
Attendance: 170
Referee: Marius Hansen Grøtta (Norway)

7 June 2025
19:00

Latvia	0–1	Estonia
	Report	Paalberg 3'

Stadion Tuško Polje, Tuzi
Attendance: 35
Referee: Aleko Aptsiauri (Georgia)

10 June 2025
19:00

Montenegro	3–0	Latvia
Čukić 13' (pen.); Popović 21'; Jovanović 47'	Report

Stadion Topolica, Bar
Attendance: 168
Referee: Klym Zabroda (Ukraine)

==== Group B4 ====
Pos	Team	Pld	W	D	L	GF	GA	GD	Pts	Promotion
1	Cyprus (H)	3	2	1	0	3	0	+3	7	Promoted to League A for the Round 1 of the 2027 UEFA European Under-19 Championship qualification
2	Kosovo	3	1	2	0	1	0	+1	5	
3	Andorra	3	1	1	1	1	1	0	4	
4	Moldova	3	0	0	3	0	4	−4	0	

Source: UEFA
Rules for classification: Qualification tiebreakers
(H) Hosts
7 March 2025
10:00

Kosovo	0–0	Andorra
	Report

Sotira Municipal Stadium, Sotira
Referee: Mateo Erceg (Croatia)
7 March 2025
14:00

Cyprus	2–0	Moldova
Charalampous 7'; Stylianou 74'	Report

Dasaki Stadium, Achna
Referee: Wojciech Myc (Poland)

10 March 2025
10:00

Kosovo	1–0	Moldova
Ahmeti 41'	Report

Sotira Municipal Stadium, Sotira
Referee: Florian Badstübner (Germany)
10 March 2025
14:00

Cyprus	1–0	Andorra
Thoma 61'	Report

Dasaki Stadium, Achna
Referee: Mateo Erceg (Croatia)

13 March 2025
14:00

Cyprus	0–0	Kosovo
	Report

Dasaki Stadium, Achna
Referee: Florian Badstübner (Germany)
13 March 2025
14:00

Andorra	1–0	Moldova
Juanfran 83' (pen.)	Report

Sotira Municipal Stadium, Sotira
Referee: Wojciech Myc (Poland)

==== Group B5 ====
Pos	Team	Pld	W	D	L	GF	GA	GD	Pts	Promotion
1	Bulgaria	3	3	0	0	6	0	+6	9	Promoted to League A for the Round 1 of the 2027 UEFA European Under-19 Championship qualification
2	Faroe Islands	3	1	1	1	2	2	0	4	
3	Luxembourg	3	1	1	1	2	3	−1	4	
4	Malta (H)	3	0	0	3	2	7	−5	0	

Source: UEFA
Rules for classification: Qualification tiebreakers
(H) Hosts
10 April 2025
11:00

Bulgaria	3–0	Malta
Stoilov 18'; Minkov 39'; Tsonov 82'	Report

Centenary Stadium, Ta' Qali
Referee: Aaron Wyn Jones (Wales)
10 April 2025
14:30

Luxembourg	0–0	Faroe Islands
	Report

Centenary Stadium, Ta' Qali
Referee: Daniel Higraff (Norway)

13 April 2025
11:00

Luxembourg	2–1	Malta
Dardari 45'; Sousa 86'	Report	Aboassaf 17'

Centenary Stadium, Ta' Qali
Referee: Aaron Wyn Jones (Wales)
13 April 2025
14:30

Bulgaria	1–0	Faroe Islands
Bozhkov 23'	Report

Centenary Stadium, Ta' Qali
Referee: Matthew MacDermid (Scotland)

16 April 2025
11:00

Faroe Islands	2–1	Malta
E. Joensen 20' (pen.); Müller 47'	Report	Vella Newell 75'

Centenary Stadium, Ta' Qali
Referee: Matthew MacDermid (Scotland)
16 April 2025
14:30

Bulgaria	2–0	Luxembourg
Minkov 49'; Stoilov 57' (pen.)	Report

Centenary Stadium, Ta' Qali
Referee: Daniel Higraff (Norway)

==== Group B6 ====
Pos	Team	Pld	W	D	L	GF	GA	GD	Pts	Promotion
1	Wales	2	1	1	0	2	1	+1	4	Promoted to League A for the Round 1 of the 2027 UEFA European Under-19 Championship qualification
2	Albania (H)	2	1	0	1	5	3	+2	3	
3	Azerbaijan	2	0	1	1	1	4	−3	1	

Source: UEFA
Rules for classification: Qualification tiebreakers
(H) Hosts
19 March 2025
15:00

Azerbaijan	1–4	Albania
Rzayev 47'	Report	Gjoka 7', 53', 64'; Kulla 76'

Elbasan Arena, Elbasan
Referee: Jérémy Muller (Luxembourg)

22 March 2025
12:00

Wales	0–0	Azerbaijan
	Report

Elbasan Arena, Elbasan
Referee: Igor Bosca (Moldova)

25 March 2025
15:00

Albania	1–2	Wales
Myrtaj 20'	Report	Grainger 63', 76'

House of Football Natural Pitch, Tirana
Referee: Igor Bosca (Moldova)

==== Group B7 ====
Pos	Team	Pld	W	D	L	GF	GA	GD	Pts	Promotion
1	Kazakhstan (H)	2	2	0	0	8	2	+6	6	Promoted to League A for the Round 1 of the 2027 UEFA European Under-19 Championship qualification
2	Lithuania	2	1	0	1	5	5	0	3	
3	Georgia	2	0	0	2	0	6	−6	0	

Source: UEFA
Rules for classification: Qualification tiebreakers
(H) Hosts
19 March 2025
08:00 (12:00 UTC+05:00)

Georgia	0–3	Kazakhstan
	Report	Orynbassar 48', 75'; Bekbolat 55'

FC Kairat Academy, Almaty
Referee: Márton Rúsz (Hungary)

22 March 2025
08:00 (12:00 UTC+05:00)

Lithuania	3–0	Georgia
Taučas 44'; Turčinskas 50'; Grabauskas 59'	Report

FC Kairat Academy, Almaty
Referee: Jakob Semler (Austria)

25 March 2025
08:00 (12:00 UTC+05:00)

Kazakhstan	5–2	Lithuania
Toleukhan 21'; Bekbolat 58', 80', 89'; Orynbassar 75' (pen.)	Report	Grabauskas 27'; Buikus 63' (pen.)

FC Kairat Academy, Almaty
Referee: Artem Gasparyan (Armenia)

== Goalscorers ==
In the qualifying round, there were 333 goals scored in 78 matches, for an average of 4.27 goals per match.

In the elite round, there were 232 goals scored in 75 matches, for an average of 3.09 goals per match.

In total, there were 565 goals scored in 153 matches, for an average of 3.69 goals per match.

7 goals

- (Germany) Lennart Karl

6 goals

- (Finland) Bruno Katz
- (Germany) Alexander Staff
- (Italy) Thomas Campaniello

5 goals

- (Croatia) Tino Kusanović
- (Czech Republic) Petr Potměšil
- (France) Djylian N'Guessan
- (Kazakhstan) Ismail Bekbolat
- (Netherlands) Jairo Beerens
- (Portugal) Anisio Cabral
- (Slovakia) Dávid Polťák
- (Wales) William Grainger

4 goals

- (Austria) Dominik Dobis
- (Belgium) René Mitongo Muteba
- (Bosnia and Herzegovina) Anes Mehmedović
- (Bosnia and Herzegovina) Din Ramić
- (Bosnia and Herzegovina) Kenan Vrban
- (Croatia) Patrik Horvat
- (Czech Republic) Kryštof Čížek
- (Denmark) Jacob Ambæk
- (Estonia) Marten-Chris Paalberg
- (France) Ilyas Azizi
- (Kosovo) Lirjon Abdullahu
- (Norway) Elion Krosa
- (Portugal) Gil Neves
- (Republic of Ireland) Jaden Umeh
- (Scotland) Fletcher Boyd
- (Sweden) Benjamin Brantlind
- (Switzerland) Adrien Llukes
- (Ukraine) Pavlo Liusin

3 goals

- (Albania) Evangjelos Gjoka
- (Albania) Gabriel Kulla
- (Belarus) Andrei Lutskovich
- (Bosnia and Herzegovina) Matej Deket
- (Cyprus) Elias Georgiou
- (England) Max Dowman
- (England) Alejandro Gomes Rodriguez
- (England) Finlay Gorman
- (France) Thibo Negre
- (Greece) Stavros Ioannou
- (Hungary) János Galambos
- (Israel) Liroy Avrevaya
- (Italy) Oliver Blini
- (Kazakhstan) Daulet Orynbassar
- (Kosovo) Rin Ahmeti
- (Montenegro) Matija Jovanović
- (Northern Ireland) Paul McGovern
- (North Macedonia) Stefan Brankovski
- (Poland) Filip Karmelita
- (Poland) Oliwier Siniawski
- (Poland) Bartosz Szywała
- (Portugal) Yoan Pereira
- (Portugal) Tomas Soares
- (Republic of Ireland) Michael Noonan
- (Scotland) Cole Burke
- (Switzerland) Josip Bralic
- (Ukraine) Dmytro Zudin

2 goals

- (Austria) Hasan Deshishku
- (Austria) Johannes Moser
- (Belarus) Artur Zablotski
- (Belgium) Nathan De Cat
- (Belgium) Noah Fernandez
- (Belgium) August De Wannemacker
- (Bulgaria) Maksim Minkov
- (Bulgaria) Radostin Stoilov
- (Croatia) Niko Horvat
- (Cyprus) Savvas Kontopoulos
- (Czech Republic) Adam Novák
- (Czech Republic) Dominik Zajac
- (Denmark) Malik Pimpong
- (England) Chizaram Ezenwata
- (England) Rio Ngumoha
- (England) Igor Tyjon
- (Finland) Noah Rantasalmi
- (Finland) Osagie Okungbowa
- (Finland) Alberto Velásquez
- (France) Paul Eymard
- (France) Rémi Himbert
- (Georgia (country)) Andria Bartishvili
- (Germany) Jeremiah Mensah
- (Germany) Salvatore Mule
- (Germany) Keziah Oteng-Mensah
- (Greece) Georgios Krommydas
- (Greece) Iason Nempis
- (Greece) Konstantinos Souvlatzis
- (Hungary) Benjámin János Gólik
- (Iceland) Ásbjörn Líndal Arnarsson
- (Iceland) Tómas Kristjánsson
- (Iceland) Gunnar Orri Olsen
- (Iceland) Guðmar Gauti Sævarsson
- (Italy) Vincenzo Damiano
- (Italy) Samuele Inacio
- (Kazakhstan) Abylay Toleukhan
- (Latvia) Olivers Beķeris
- (Lithuania) Adomas Buikus
- (Lithuania) Simas Grabauskas
- (Lithuania) Carmine Mennea
- (Lithuania) Rodion Piazenko
- (Netherlands) Pharrel Nana Yaw Yiadom Nash
- (Netherlands) Kelvin Neijenhuis
- (Netherlands) Emre Ünüvar
- (North Macedonia) Ivo Markoski
- (Norway) Harald Woxen
- (Poland) Karol Delikat
- (Poland) Filip Skorb
- (Portugal) Mauro Furtado
- (Portugal) Bernardo Lima
- (Portugal) Mateus Mide
- (Romania) Ianis Avramescu
- (Romania) Denis-Alberto-Ionuț Țăroi
- (Scotland) Cameron Williams
- (Serbia) Vasilije Kostov
- (Slovakia) Maxim Mateáš
- (Slovenia) Denis Videnović
- (Spain) Iago Barreiros
- (Spain) Asier Bonel
- (Spain) Oscar Gistau
- (Spain) Sama Nomoko
- (Spain) Igor Oyono
- (Sweden) Love Arrhov
- (Sweden) Milian Öberg
- (Sweden) Charlie Pavey
- (Sweden) Ahmed Saeed
- (Switzerland) Nevio Scherrer
- (Turkey) Hasan Ege Akdoğan
- (Wales) Hayden Allmark

1 goal

- (Albania) Leon Myrtaj
- (Andorra) Juan Francisco Haddad Cuchiarelli
- (Andorra) Joel Viana
- (Armenia) Arsen Arakelyan
- (Armenia) David Simonian
- (Austria) Rafael Feldinger
- (Azerbaijan) Alibay Mahmudov
- (Azerbaijan) Tunar Rzayev
- (Belarus) Mikita Kalesnikovich
- (Belarus) Yahor Molchan
- (Belarus) Maksim Sakuta
- (Belarus) Ilya Verenich
- (Belarus) Anatoli Yastachkin
- (Belgium) Jessi Da Silva
- (Belgium) Aaron Murenzi
- (Bosnia and Herzegovina) Nikša Blagojević
- (Bosnia and Herzegovina) Dino Delić
- (Bosnia and Herzegovina) Ajdin Ibrahimović
- (Bosnia and Herzegovina) Armin Spahić
- (Bosnia and Herzegovina) Eman Subašić
- (Bulgaria) Kaloyan Bozhkov
- (Bulgaria) Samuil Tsonov
- (Croatia) Bruno Mišura
- (Croatia) Pavle Smiljanić
- (Croatia) Roko Vojvodić
- (Cyprus) Christos Charalampous
- (Cyprus) Antreas Mavroudis
- (Cyprus) Orestis Panayiotou
- (Cyprus) Ilias Stylianou
- (Cyprus) Christodoulos Thoma
- (Czech Republic) Patrik Jurásek
- (Czech Republic) Jan Křivánek
- (Czech Republic) Vít Škrkoň
- (Czech Republic) Hugo Sochůrek
- (Czech Republic) Petr Střeska
- (Denmark) Ali Al-Najar
- (Denmark) Adam Fuglsang
- (Denmark) Tristan Panduro
- (England) Andre Dike
- (England) Harry Howell
- (England) Ryan McAidoo
- (England) Lucas Rawlings
- (England) Freddie Simmonds
- (England) Reggie Walsh
- (England) Luca Williams-Barnett
- (Estonia) Sander Alamaa
- (Estonia) Nikita Kalmõkov
- (Estonia) Karl Mägi
- (Faroe Islands) Eydthór Joensen
- (Faroe Islands) Páll Müller
- (Finland) Valtteri Lehtomäki
- (Finland) Niilo Siren
- (Finland) Otto Tiitinen
- (Finland) Topias Töllinen
- (France) Soan Ameline
- (France) Sanah Camara
- (France) Rémi Himbert
- (France) Milan Leccese
- (France) Ibrahim Mbaye
- (Georgia (country)) Koba Kakashvili
- (Georgia (country)) Georgii Kobakhidze
- (Germany) David Creta
- (Germany) Moritz Göttlicher
- (Germany) Can Armando Güner
- (Germany) Mussa Kaba
- (Germany) Yunus Ünal
- (Greece) Dimitrios Berdos
- (Greece) Christos Kapellas
- (Greece) Georgios Siozios
- (Greece) Konstantinos Theocharis
- (Hungary) Gergely Csóka
- (Hungary) Kristóf Lakatos
- (Hungary) Viktor Petrók
- (Iceland) Viktor Bjarki Dadason
- (Iceland) Alexander Máni Guðjónsson
- (Iceland) Helgi Hafsteinn Jóhannsson
- (Iceland) Tómas Óli Kristjánsson
- (Israel) Itamar Chosyd
- (Israel) Liam Lusky
- (Israel) Ilay Ben Simon
- (Italy) Destiny Elimoghale
- (Italy) Andrea Luongo
- (Italy) Jean Mambuku
- (Italy) Antonio Pirrò
- (Italy) Luca Reggiani
- (Italy) Samuel Wiafe
- (Kazakhstan) Shyngys Kaliev
- (Kazakhstan) Raimbek Kenesbekov
- (Kazakhstan) Dastan Satpayev
- (Kosovo) Omer Shala
- (Latvia) Artjoms Butriks
- (Latvia) Nikita Doroņins
- (Latvia) Markuss Gomins
- (Lithuania) Dovas Grudzinskas
- (Lithuania) Dominykas Taučas
- (Lithuania) Jugas Turčinskas
- (Luxembourg) Bilal Dardari
- (Luxembourg) Kevin Da Silva Fernandes
- (Luxembourg) Ruben Sousa
- (Malta) Sami Aboassaf
- (Malta) Matteo Paolo Grech
- (Malta) Andreas Vella
- (Montenegro) Jovan Anđić
- (Montenegro) Vesko Čukić
- (Montenegro) Viktor Lesjak
- (Montenegro) Marko Popović
- (Montenegro) Andrija Vukoje
- (Netherlands) Levi Acheampong
- (Netherlands) Sami Bouhoudane
- (Netherlands) Ayoub Ouarghi
- (Netherlands) Chivano Wijks
- (Northern Ireland) Darragh McCann
- (Northern Ireland) Cead McGrath
- (Northern Ireland) Ceadach O'Neill
- (Northern Ireland) Troy Savage
- (North Macedonia) Aleksandar Grashevski
- (North Macedonia) Ditmir Hodja
- (North Macedonia) Lorent Zhaku
- (Norway) Philip Holseter-Karlsen
- (Norway) Olav Mengshoel
- (Norway) Jesper Renshusløkken
- (Norway) Elias Slørdal
- (Poland) Mikołaj Czerniatowicz
- (Poland) Jakub Falkiewicz
- (Poland) Tymoteusz Gmur
- (Portugal) Brandao Baptista
- (Portugal) Martim Chelmik
- (Portugal) Duarte Cunha
- (Portugal) Stevan Manuel
- (Portugal) Rafael Quintas
- (Republic of Ireland) Charles Akinrintoyo
- (Republic of Ireland) Brody Lee
- (Republic of Ireland) Billy Canny
- (Republic of Ireland) Ramón Martos
- (Republic of Ireland) Goodness Ogbonna
- (Republic of Ireland) Finn Sherlock
- (Romania) Sebastian Banu
- (Romania) Alexandru Bota
- (Romania) Raul Cojocariu
- (Romania) Rares Coman
- (Romania) Costyn Gheorghe
- (Romania) Mihai Razvan Ninaci
- (Romania) Ianis Podoleanu
- (Romania) Marco Popescu
- (Romania) Albert Radu
- (Romania) Bogdan Ungureanu
- (Scotland) Hayden Borland
- (Scotland) Brodie Dair
- (Scotland) Jamie Hislop
- (Scotland) Taylor Hogarth
- (Scotland) Cooper Masson
- (Scotland) Alexander Smith
- (Serbia) Aleksa Damjanović
- (Serbia) Aleksa Petrović
- (Serbia) Miloš Soprenić
- (Serbia) Luka Zarić
- (Slovakia) Rocco Baravelli
- (Slovakia) Oliver Fecso
- (Slovakia) Dominik Pecsuk
- (Slovakia) Maevan Vincent
- (Slovenia) Bor Ceferin
- (Slovenia) Svit Hočevar
- (Slovenia) David Jereb
- (Slovenia) Kristjan Kozar
- (Slovenia) Žan Meško
- (Slovenia) Svit Mlekuž
- (Slovenia) Nejc Viher
- (Spain) Enzo Alves
- (Spain) Alex Campos
- (Spain) Juan Vacas Diaz
- (Spain) Jaume Durá
- (Spain) Toni Fernández
- (Spain) Alexis Ciria Flores
- (Spain) Pedro Rodriguez Iglesias
- (Spain) Iker Quintero
- (Sweden) Rasmus Bergkvall
- (Sweden) Björn Hedlöf
- (Sweden) Elvis Van Der Laan
- (Switzerland) Ethan Bruchez
- (Switzerland) Ivan Cossalter
- (Switzerland) Ilija Despotovic
- (Switzerland) Nico Lazri
- (Switzerland) Mladen Mijajlovic
- (Turkey) Ahmet Çobanoğlu
- (Turkey) Oğuzhan Ertem
- (Turkey) Mustafa Yortaç
- (Ukraine) Ivan Andreyko
- (Ukraine) Mukhammad Dzhurabaiev
- (Ukraine) Arsen Zalypka
- (Wales) Louie Bradbury
- (Wales) Ollie Dewsbury
- (Wales) Carter Heywood
- (Wales) Olivier Newman

1 own goal

- (Albania) Darli Kurti (against Croatia)
- (Andorra) Tomas Graça De Almeida (against Czechia)
- (Andorra) Juan Francisco Haddad Cuchiarelli (against Czechia)
- (Denmark) Andreas Søndenbroe (against Finland)
- (Finland) Topias Töllinen (against Portugal)
- (Germany) Nebe Sirak Dominic (against Czechia)
- (Greece) Vasileios Labvas (against Hungary)
- (Italy) Leonardo Bovio (against Ukraine)
- (Moldova) Evghenii Macarov (against Israel)
- (Montenegro) Andrija Vukoje (against Israel)
- (Republic of Ireland) Oisin McDonagh (against Northern Ireland)
- (San Marino) Michele Stefani (against Belarus)
- (Slovakia) Milan Kodaj (against Cyprus)
