= Chivano Wijks =

Dutch footballer (born 2008)

Personal information
- Date of birth: 22 May 2008 (age 18)
- Place of birth: The Hague, Netherlands
- Positions: Right-back; centre-back

Team information
- Current team: Bayern Munich U19

Youth career
- VV SVH
- RVC Celeritas
- –2021: Voetbal Club Sparta
- 2021–2024: Feyenoord
- 2024–: Bayern Munich

Senior career*
Years	Team	Apps	(Gls)
2025–	Bayern Munich II	0	(0)

International career^{‡}
2023–2024	Netherlands U16	6	(1)
2024–2025	Netherlands U17	10	(2)
2025–	Netherlands U18	3	(0)
- * Club domestic league appearances and goals ‡ National team caps and goals as of 13 October 2025

Chivano Wijks (born 22 May 2008) is a Dutch footballer who plays as a defender for the under-19 team (U19 DFB-Nachwuchsliga) of Bundesliga club Bayern Munich.

== Early life ==
Wijks was born on 22 May 2008, in the Hague, Netherlands, and grew up in the city, he is the son of the late Surinamese-born footballer Marvin Wijks, and the older brother of fellow Dutch footballer Gennaro Wijks (who has played for the youth academies of Dutch clubs Sparta Rotterdam as well as Ajax, and German club RB Leipzig).

== Club career ==
As a youth player, Wijks progressed through the youth academies of Dutch sides VV SVH, RVC Celeritas, and Voetbal Club Sparta.

In 2021, he joined the youth academy of Dutch Eredivisie side Feyenoord. Three years later, ahead of the 2024–25 season, Wijks moved to Germany and joined the youth academy of Bundesliga side Bayern Munich.

He received his first call-up with Bayern Munich's reserve team during the 2025–26 season, for the first time on 1 August 2025, during a 6–3 home win Regionalliga Bayern match against TSV Buchbach, as an unused substitute however. Seven days later he was called up again, during a 5–0 home win Regionalliga Bayern match against TSV Schwaben Augsburg on 8 August, but yet to make his professional debut.

== International career ==
Wijks is a Netherlands youth international. During the autumn of 2024 and the spring of 2025, he played for the Netherlands national under-17 football team for 2025 UEFA European Under-17 Championship qualification.

== Style of play ==
Wijks plays as a right-back and centre-back. German newspaper Tz wrote in 2025 that he is "a straightforward, very attacking right-back... is extremely fast".
