= Álex Campos =

Spanish footballer (born 2008)

Personal information
- Full name: Álex Campos Camí
- Date of birth: 2 February 2008 (age 18)
- Place of birth: Aitona, Spain
- Height: 1.85 m (6 ft 1 in)
- Position: Centre-back

Team information
- Current team: Barcelona B
- Number: 4

Youth career
- 2018–2021: Atlètic Segre
- 2021–2026: Barcelona

Senior career*
Years	Team	Apps	(Gls)
2025–	Barcelona B	21	(1)
2026–	Barcelona	0	(0)

International career^{‡}
2024	Spain U16	2	(1)
2024–2025	Spain U17	11	(2)
2025–2026	Spain U18	4	(0)
2026–	Spain U19	3	(0)
- * Club domestic league appearances and goals as of 20 October 2026 ‡ National team caps and goals as of 31 March 2026

Álex Campos Camí (born 2 February 2008) is a Spanish professional footballer who plays as a centre-back for Segunda Federación club Barcelona Atlètic.

== Early life ==
Campos was born on 2 February 2008 in Aitona, Lleida, Catalonia.

== Club career ==
As a youth player, Campos joined the youth academy of Atlètic Segre. Following his stint there, he joined the youth academy of La Liga side Barcelona, where he played in the UEFA Youth League.

Ahead of the 2025–26 season, he was promoted to the club's reserve team, where he was regarded to have established himself as a regular starter while playing for them. In 2026, he extended his contract with the Blaugrana until July 2029. On 20 October 2026, he was first called up to the Barça senior team during a 2–4 away loss to PSG in the UEFA Champions League.

== International career ==
Campos is a Spain youth international and has represented the country internationally at under-16, under-17, under-18 and under-19 levels. Altogether, he made two appearances and scored one goal while playing for the Spain national under-16 football team.

During the spring of 2025, he played for the Spain national under-17 football team for 2025 UEFA European Under-17 Championship qualification. One year later, he played for the Spain national under-19 football team for 2026 UEFA European Under-19 Championship qualification.

== Style of play ==
Campos plays as a defender and is right-footed and has received comparisons to Spain international Pau Cubarsí. Initially, he played as a midfielder while playing for the youth academy of Atlètic Segre before switching to defender while playing for the youth academy of Barcelona.

Spanish newspaper Mundo Deportivo wrote in 2026 that "the... right-footed center-back stands out for his excellent aerial ability in both penalty areas and his decisive tackling in defense. He also possesses good ball control, with the ability to look up and distribute the ball effectively. Standing at 1.85 meters tall, he has the physical attributes to be an alternative in the center of defense".
