= Sama Nomoko =

Spanish footballer (born 2008)

Personal information
- Full name: Samakou Nomoko Touré
- Date of birth: 20 March 2008 (age 18)
- Place of birth: Mali
- Height: 1.80 m (5 ft 11 in)
- Position: Winger

Team information
- Current team: Barcelona B

Youth career
- –2016: Cornellà
- 2016–: Barcelona

Senior career*
Years	Team	Apps	(Gls)
2025–	Barcelona B	14	(2)

International career^{‡}
2024–	Spain U17	5	(2)
- * Club domestic league appearances and goals as of 31 December 2025 ‡ National team caps and goals as of 14 December 2024

Samakou Nomoko Touré (born 20 March 2008) is a professional footballer who plays as a winger for Segunda Federación club Barcelona Atlètic. Born in Mali, he is a Spain youth international.

== Early life ==
Nomoko was born on 20 March 2008. Born in Mali, he grew up in Catalonia, Spain.

== Club career ==
As a youth player, Nomoko joined the youth academy of Spanish side Cornellà. Following his stint there, he joined the youth academy of Spanish La Liga side Barcelona in 2016, where he spent four years with the club's seven-a-side youth teams. Ahead of the 2025–26 season, he as promoted to their under-19 team.

On 17 December 2025, it was confirmed Nomoko had ruptured his Anterior cruciate ligament (ACL) and undergone surgery.

== International career ==
Nomoko is a Spain youth international. During October and November 2024, he played for the Spain national under-17 football team for 2025 UEFA European Under-17 Championship qualification.

== Style of play ==
Nomoko plays as a winger and is right-footed. Spanish news website Relevo wrote in 2022 that he is "a highly skilled winger with a great change of pace, he can play on both sides. He's a good crosser and a good one-on-one player to beat his opponent".

== Honours ==
Barcelona

- UEFA Youth League: 2024–25
