= Mauro Furtado =

Portuguese footballer

Personal information
- Full name: Mauro Landim Furtado
- Date of birth: 30 July 2008 (age 18)
- Place of birth: Lisbon, Portugal
- Height: 1.83 m (6 ft 0 in)
- Position: Centre-back

Team information
- Current team: Girona
- Number: 33

Youth career
- 2013–2026: Benfica

Senior career*
Years	Team	Apps	(Gls)
2026–	Girona B	1	(0)
2026–	Girona	0	(0)

International career^{‡}
2022	Portugal U15	3	(1)
2023–2024	Portugal U16	7	(0)
2024–2025	Portugal U17	23	(3)
2026–	Portugal U18	6	(0)
Medal record
Men's football
Representing Portugal
FIFA U-17 World Cup
Winner	2025 Qatar
UEFA European Under-17 Championship
Winner	2025 Albania
- * Club domestic league appearances and goals ‡ National team caps and goals as of 31 January 2026

Mauro Landim Furtado (born 30 July 2008) is a Portuguese footballer who plays as a centre back for Spanish club Girona.

== Club career ==
Born in Lisbon, Furtado signed his first professional contract with Benfica in 2024. In July 2026, he was a transfer target for Sassuolo, Marseille and Leeds United. On 22 August, he signed a five-year contract with Spanish club Girona, newly relegated to the Segunda División. The transfer fee was €1 million for half of the player's economic rights, with the option of another 30% for €600,000. He said he joined the club for its reputation for opportunities for young players. He was first chosen for the game on 5 September, away to Sporting de Gijón.

== International career ==
On 13 November 2024, in the first game of 2025 UEFA European Under-17 Championship qualification, Furtado scored after four minutes of a 10–0 win for Portugal under-17 against Liechtenstein. He played the final on 1 June 2025 as his team defeated France 3–0 in Albania. He was included in the Team of the Tournament.

At the 2025 FIFA U-17 World Cup in Qatar, Furtado scored in a 6–1 opening win over New Caledonia. His team won the title, and he was given the Bronze Ball as the third-best player. Spanish sports newspaper Marca highlighted him among the Portuguese champions.

== Career statistics ==
As of match played 27 October 2026

Appearances and goals by club, season and competition
Club	Season	League			Cup		Europe		Other		Total	
Club	Season	Division	Apps	Goals	Apps	Goals	Apps	Goals	Apps	Goals	Apps	Goals
Girona B	2026–27	Segunda Federación	1	0	—		—		—		1	0
Girona	2026–27	Segunda División	0	0	1	0	—		—		1	0
Career total			1	0	1	0	0	0	0	0	2	0
