= Lee Dair =

Scottish footballer

Personal information
- Date of birth: 28 May 1977 (age 49)
- Place of birth: Dunfermline, Scotland
- Position: Midfielder

Youth career
- Rangers BC

Senior career*
Years	Team	Apps	(Gls)
1993–1997	Rangers	0	(0)
1997–1998	Raith Rovers	25	(4)
1998	Cowdenbeath	3	(1)
1998	Partick Thistle	1	(0)
1998–1999	East Fife	16	(5)
1999–2002	Hill of Beath Hawthorn		
2002–2003	Cowdenbeath	13	(1)
2003–2004	Hill of Beath Hawthorn		
2004–2006	Linlithgow Rose		
2006–2009	Ballingry Rovers		
2009–2010	Hill of Beath Hawthorn		
2010	Ballingry Rovers (player/manager)		
2010–2014	Oakley United		
2014	Ballingry Rovers (player/manager)		
2014–2016	Lochore Welfare (player/manager)		
Total		58	(11)

Managerial career
- 2010: Ballingry Rovers
- 2014: Ballingry Rovers
- 2014–2016: Lochore Welfare
- 2018–2020: Dundonald Bluebell (manager/assistant manager)
- 2020-2023: Hill of Beath Hawthorn(Assistant Manager)
- 2023-2024: Inverkeithing Hillfield Swifts(Management)
- * Club domestic league appearances and goals as of 17:10, 14 December 2019 (UTC)

Lee Dair (born 28 May 1977), is a Scottish former professional footballer. He has played in the Scottish Football League First Division for Raith Rovers and now coaches in the East of Scotland football leagues.

== Career ==
Dair began his career with Rangers but never made a competitive appearance for the Ibrox club. He joined Raith Rovers in August 1997, succeeding his brother Jason who had just left Rovers for Millwall. After trial appearances for Cowdenbeath and Partick Thistle, Dair joined East Fife in November 1998.

Since 2003, Dair has had a long career in Junior football, his clubs including Hill of Beath Hawthorn, Linlithgow Rose, Ballingry Rovers and Oakley United.

After a brief spell as player-manager in 2010, Dair was appointed as manager of Ballingry for a second time in June 2014 but resigned the following October. He became manager of fellow Fife side Lochore Welfare later the same month before leaving this position in the summer of 2016.

== Personal life ==
Dair is the nephew of the late Rangers and Scotland legend Jim Baxter, while his father Ian played for Cowdenbeath, and won the Scottish Junior Cup with Glenrothes in 1975. His son Brodie Dair is also a professional footballer.
