= Samuel Wiafe =

Italian footballer (born 2008)

Personal information
- Date of birth: 22 June 2008 (age 18)
- Place of birth: Ghana
- Height: 1.81 m (5 ft 11 in)
- Position: Midfielder

Team information
- Current team: Genoa
- Number: 71

Youth career
- Cittadella Vis Modena
- 2014–2025: Modena

Senior career*
Years	Team	Apps	(Gls)
2025–2026	Modena	4	(0)
2026–	Genoa	6	(0)

International career^{‡}
2024	Italy U17	2	(1)
2026–	Italy U19	7	(1)
- * Club domestic league appearances and goals as of 8 November 2026 ‡ National team caps and goals as of 11 November 2026

Samuel Wiafe (born 22 June 2008) is a professional footballer who plays as a midfielder for Serie A club Genoa. Born in Ghana, he is a youth international for Italy.

== Club career ==
=== Modena ===
Born in Ghana, Wiafe arrived in Italy as a 12 years old. There he first played for Cittadella Vis in Modena, before joining Modena FC 2018.

There he started playing with the primavera team during the 2024–25 season, becoming a key player with the youth team the following season.

In January 2026, Wiafe signed his first professional contract with Modena.

Wiafe made his professional debut with Modena in a 2–1 away Serie B loss to Virtus Entella on 3 March 2026.

== International career ==
Wiafe is a youth international for Italy, having represented for the under-17, and scored his first goal with them in November 2024, during a 7–0 Euro Under-17 qualifications win over Norway. He holds dual Ghanaian and Italian citizenship, making him potentially eligible for the either nation to represent internationally.
