= Andria Bartishvili =

Georgian footballer (born 2009)

andria bartishvili
Personal information
- Date of birth: 30 March 2009 (age 17)
- Place of birth: Tbilisi, Georgia
- Height: 1.70 m (5 ft 7 in)
- Positions: Attacking midfielder; left winger

Team information
- Current team: Iberia 1999 (on loan from Kolkheti 1913)
- Number: 11

Youth career
- –2024: Dinamo Tbilisi

Senior career*
Years	Team	Apps	(Gls)
2025–	Kolkheti 1913	17	(0)
2026–	→ Iberia 1999 (loan)	17	(2)

International career^{‡}
2025	Georgia U16	2	(0)
2024–2025	Georgia U17	15	(7)
2025–	Georgia U19	5	(2)
2026–	Georgia U21	2	(0)
- * Club domestic league appearances and goals as of 07:54, 20 October 2026 (UTC) ‡ National team caps and goals as of 19:42, 11 August 2026 (UTC)

Andria Bartishvili (Georgian: ანდრია ბართიშვილი, born 30 March 2009) is a Georgian professional footballer who plays as an attacking midfielder or left winger for Erovnuli Liga club Iberia 1999, on loan from Kolkheti 1913. In September 2026, after widespread speculation with top European sides, he agreed a pre-transfer to join Premier League club Arsenal in July 2027 when he turns 18.

== Club career ==
=== Youth career ===
Bartishvili is a product of the youth academy of Dinamo Tbilisi. He was ten years old when he was named Player of the 2018 Bendela Cup held among U10 and U11 teams. The next autumn, Bartishvili shone first at the Qabala Unity Cup as the best striker and topscorer, followed by the U11 Ateitis Cup tournament, organized by Lithuania, where he was selected as the best midfielder.

In 2022, while Dinamo U13 won an international tournament in Batumi, Bartishvili was voted as the best player.

In April 2023, Bartishvili received the same recognition in Italy despite his U14 team finishing 4th at another international competition. A year later, at an annual awards ceremony held by the Georgian Football Federation, he was presented with the Aleksandre Chivadze silver medal for U17 players.

=== Kolkheti 1913 ===
As Bartishvili moved to Kolkheti 1913 prior to the 2025 season, he was named by La Gazzetta Georgia among the six promising young players expected to shine this year. He made his first Erovnuli Liga appearance in a 1–0 away win over Samgurali on 1 April 2025, becoming the youngest player of the season at 16 years and two days. At the end of the year, Bartishvili was named the best U17 player and awarded the golden medal.

==== Loan to Iberia 1999 ====
In January 2026, Bartishvili signed for Iberia 1999 on a year-long loan deal. His first Erovnuli Liga goal came in a 1–0 win over Gagra on 20 May.

=== Arsenal ===
On 11 September 2026, Arsenal announced that they had reached an agreement to sign Bartishvili after he turns 18, with the transfer scheduled to take effect in July 2027 for a reported fee of around £3.85 million.

== International career ==
Bartishvili was initially a member of the national U15 team which took part in an international tournament held in Yerevan in May 2023. A year later, he joined the U16s for UEFA Development Cup games hosted by Chișinău.

In September 2024, Bartishvili was called up for U17 friendlies against Slovakia and Moldova. He was also in a starting line-up for all five qualifying matches that Georgia played during the 2024–25 season, scoring twice. His debut goal came against Slovenia on 9 October 2024.

In June 2025, Bartishvili was dubbed the new Kvaratskhelia following his stunning individual performance and a brace against Kazakhstan U17 during a three-team international tournament held in Qabala.

On 27 March 2026, Bartishvili made his debut for the U21 team as Georgia hosted Latvia in their 2027 UEFA European Championship campaign.

== Career statistics ==
As of match played 19 October 2026

Appearances and goals by club, season and competition
Club	Season	League			Georgian Cup		Continental		Other		Total	
Club	Season	Division	Apps	Goals	Apps	Goals	Apps	Goals	Apps	Goals	Apps	Goals
Kolkheti 1913	2025	Erovnuli Liga	17	0	1	0	—		—		18	0
Iberia 1999 (loan)	2026	Erovnuli Liga	17	2	0	0	6 (Note: Three appearances in UEFA Champions League, two appearances in UEFA Europa League, one appearance in UEFA Conference League)	0	2 (Note: Appearances in Georgian Super Cup)	0	25	2
Career total			34	2	1	0	6	0	2	0	43	2

== Honours ==
Individual

- Erovnuli Liga Under-17 Player of the Year: 2025
