= Italy national under-19 football team =

National under-19 association football team representing Italy

Italy Under-19
- Nickname: Gli Azzurrini (The Little Blues)
- Association: Italian Football Federation (Federazione Italiana Giuoco Calcio – FIGC)
- Head coach: Massimiliano Favo
First colours	Second colours

European Championship
- Appearances: 25 (first in 1981)
- Best result: Champions (1958, 1966, 2003, 2023)

The Italy national under-19 football team is the national under-19 football team of Italy and is controlled by the Italian Football Federation.

The team competes in the UEFA European Under-19 Championship, held every year.

== UEFA U-18 Championship Record ==
Before 2002, the event was called a U-18 tournament, as the players were required to under-18 at the start of qualifying phase and turn 19 in the final round.

- 1981: Second Round
- 1982: Qualifying Round
- 1983: Semi-finalists
- 1984: Second Round
- 1986: Runners-up
- 1988: Qualifying Round
- 1990: Qualifying Round
- 1992: Qualifying Round
- 1993: Intermediary Round
- 1994: Intermediary Round
- 1995: Runners-up
- 1996: 4th in Group B
- 1997: Preliminary Round
- 1998: Preliminary Round
- 1999: Runners-up
- 2000: Intermediary Round
- 2001: Preliminary Round

== UEFA U-19 Championship Record ==
Year	Round	GP	W	D*	L	GS	GA
(Norway) 2002	Did not qualify						
(Liechtenstein) 2003	Champions	5	4	1	0	10	2
(Switzerland) 2004	Group stage	3	1	1	1	5	2
(Northern Ireland) 2005	Did not qualify						
(Poland) 2006	Did not qualify						
(Austria) 2007	Did not qualify						
(Czech Republic) 2008	Runners-up	5	2	2	1	7	7
(Ukraine) 2009	Did not qualify						
(France) 2010	Group stage	3	0	1	2	0	5
(Romania) 2011	Did not qualify						
(Estonia) 2012	Did not qualify						
(Lithuania) 2013	Did not qualify						
(Hungary) 2014	Did not qualify						
(Greece) 2015	Did not qualify						
(Germany) 2016	Runners-up	5	2	2	1	5	7
(Georgia (country)) 2017	Did not qualify						
(Finland) 2018	Runners-up	5	3	1	1	10	7
(Armenia) 2019	Group stage	3	1	0	2	5	5
(Northern Ireland) 2020	Cancelled due to Covid-19						
(Romania) 2021	Cancelled due to Covid-19						
(Slovakia) 2022	Semi-finals	4	2	0	2	5	7
(Malta) 2023	Champions	5	5	0	0	10	8
(Northern Ireland) 2024	Semi-finals	4	2	0	2	7	5
(Romania) 2025	Did not qualify						
(Wales) 2026	Group stage	3	1	1	1	2	1
(Czech Republic) 2027	To be determinated						
(Bulgaria) 2028	To be determinated						
(Netherlands) 2029	To be determinated						

== Honours ==
- UEFA European Under-19 Championship

- Winner (2): 2003; 2023
- Runners-up (3): 2008; 2016; 2018

- Under-18 era (1957–2001)

- Winner (2): 1958; 1966
- Runners-up (4): 1959; 1986; 1995; 1999

== Players ==
The following 20 players were called up for the Qualification Round 2 of the 2027 UEFA European Under-19 Championship.

No.	Pos.	Player	Date of birth (age)	Club
	GK	Alessandro Anelli	16 December 2008 (age 17)	(Italian Football Federation) Atalanta U23
	GK	Alessandro Longoni	31 January 2008 (age 18)	(French Football Federation) Paris Saint-Germain
	DF	Benit Borasio	20 January 2008 (age 18)	(Italian Football Federation) Juventus
	DF	Leonardo Bovio	4 February 2008 (age 18)	(Italian Football Federation) Inter Milan
	DF	Cristiano De Paoli	27 January 2008 (age 18)	(Italian Football Federation) Como
	DF	Jean Mambuku	8 July 2008 (age 18)	(French Football Federation) Stade de Reims
	DF	Mattia Marello	13 March 2008 (age 18)	(Italian Football Federation) Inter Milan
	DF	David Marini	4 March 2008 (age 18)	(Italian Football Federation) Cesena
	DF	Andrea Natali	28 January 2008 (age 18)	(Royal Dutch Football Association) AZ Alkmaar
	MF	Andrea Ballanti	29 May 2008 (age 18)	(Italian Football Federation) Torino
	MF	Vincenzo Damiano	28 November 2008 (age 17)	(Italian Football Federation) Genoa
	MF	Christian Comotto (captain)	25 April 2008 (age 18)	(Italian Football Federation) AC Milan
	MF	Valerio Maccaroni	3 June 2008 (age 18)	(Italian Football Federation) Roma
	MF	Vincenzo Prisco	7 August 2008 (age 18)	(Italian Football Federation) Bari
	MF	Federico Steffanoni	4 September 2008 (age 18)	(Italian Football Federation) Atalanta U23
	MF	Samuel Wiafe	22 June 2008 (age 18)	(Italian Football Federation) Modena
	FW	Antonio Arena	10 February 2009 (age 17)	(Italian Football Federation) Roma
	FW	Destiny Elimoghale	23 April 2009 (age 17)	(Italian Football Federation) Juventus
	FW	Christian Fogliaro	24 February 2008 (age 18)	(Italian Football Federation) Monza
	FW	Simone Lontani	18 January 2008 (age 18)	(Italian Football Federation) Parma

== See also ==
- Italy national under-20 football team
- UEFA European Under-19 Championship
