= Destiny Elimoghale =

Italian footballer (born 2009)

Personal information
- Full name: Destiny Onoguekhan Elimoghale
- Date of birth: 23 April 2009 (age 17)
- Place of birth: Turin, Italy
- Height: 1.82 m (6 ft 0 in)
- Positions: Winger; attacking midfielder; forward

Team information
- Current team: Juventus Next Gen
- Number: 14

Youth career
- GAR Rebaudengo
- Juventus

Senior career*
| Years | Team | Apps | (Gls) |
| 2026– | Juventus Next Gen | 10 | (0) |
| 2026– | Juventus | 0 | (0) |

International career^{‡}
| 2023–2024 | Italy U15 | 13 | (1) |
| 2025 | Italy U16 | 2 | (0) |
| 2025– | Italy U17 | 14 | (3) |
| 2025– | Italy U18 | 7 | (2) |
| 2026– | Italy U19 | 7 | (1) |
Medal record
Men's football
Representing Italy
FIFA U-17 World Cup
| Third place | 2025 Qatar |
- * Club domestic league appearances and goals as of 8 November 2026 ‡ National team caps and goals as of 11 November 2026

Destiny Onoguekhan Elimoghale (born 23 April 2009) is an Italian professional footballer who plays as a winger, attacking midfielder and forward for Serie C Group B club Juventus Next Gen.

== Early life ==
Elimoghale was born on 23 April 2009. A native of Turin, Italy, he is of Nigerian descent through his parents.

== Club career ==
As a youth player, Elimoghale joined the youth academy of GAR Rebaudengo. Following his stint there, he joined the youth academy of Serie A side Juventus. During the 2026–27 season he was promoted and became a regular starter with Juventus Next Gen in Serie C, and eventually got called-up with the senior team by head coach Luciano Spalletti.

== International career ==
Elimoghale is an Italy youth international. During May 2025, he played for the Italy national under-17 football team at the 2025 UEFA European Under-17 Championship. Later in November finishing in third place at the 2025 FIFA U-17 World Cup.

== Style of play ==
Elimoghale plays as a winger and is right-footed. Italian news website wrote in 2025 that "he has similar moves to his idol Rafael Leao... impressive speed, and excellent dribbling... technique, speed, and composure, these are the main characteristics that sum up this young man's talent".

== Honours ==
Italy U17

- FIFA U-17 World Cup third place: 2025
