= Tristan Panduro =

Danish footballer

Personal information
- Full name: Tristan Aldcroft Panduro
- Date of birth: 10 January 2008 (age 18)
- Place of birth: Denmark
- Height: 1.72 m (5 ft 8 in)
- Position: Midfielder

Team information
- Current team: Zulte Waregem
- Number: 25

Youth career
- 2022–2025: FC Copenhagen

Senior career*
Years	Team	Apps	(Gls)
2026–	Zulte Waregem	0	(0)

International career
2023–2024	Denmark U16	6	(1)
2024–	Denmark U17	8	(1)
- * Club domestic league appearances and goals as of 9 February 2026

Tristan Aldcroft Panduro (born 10 January 2008) is a Danish footballer who plays as a midfielder for Belgian Pro League club Zulte Waregem. He is a Danish youth international.

== Club career ==
Panduro joined FC Copenhagen's youth team in 2022, signing a contract until the end of 2025.

On 10 January 2026, Panduro joined Belgian Pro League club SV Zulte Waregem, signing a two-and-a-half-year contract, with an option to extend it with two more years.

== International career ==
He is a Danish youth international. Some reports suggest he is also eligible to represent England at international level.

== Style of play ==
Panduro has been described as a versatile central midfield player.

== Personal life ==
Panduro has an English mother.
