= Igor Oyono =

Spanish footballer (born 2008)

Personal information
- Full name: Igor Venancio Oyono Oyana
- Date of birth: 7 February 2008 (age 18)
- Place of birth: Barakaldo, Spain
- Height: 1.82 m (6 ft 0 in)
- Position: Striker

Team information
- Current team: Basconia
- Number: 10

Youth career
- –2020: Barakaldo
- 2020–2021: Roda
- 2021–2024: Villarreal
- 2024–: Athletic Bilbao

Senior career*
Years	Team	Apps	(Gls)
2024–	Bilbao Athletic	20	(1)
2025–	Basconia	18	(4)

International career^{‡}
2022–2023	Spain U15	11	(9)
2023–	Spain U17	10	(3)
2023–	Spain U18	4	(0)
- * Club domestic league appearances and goals as of 14 May 2026 ‡ National team caps and goals as of 04:19, 31 May 2024 (UTC)

Igor Venancio Oyono Oyana (born 7 February 2008) is a Spanish footballer who plays as a striker for Segunda Federación team Basconia.

== Club career ==
As a youth player, Oyono joined the academy of Barakaldo CF, and helped the team win the league. In 2020, he joined the academy of Villarreal CF where he was considered one of the best prospects, playing in teams above his own age. In January 2024, he signed for Athletic Bilbao on a six-year contract.

== International career ==
Oyono has represented Spain internationally at youth levels. He played for the under-17 team at the 2023 FIFA U-17 World Cup.

== Style of play ==
Oyono mainly operates as a striker. He is left-footed and is known for his strength and speed.

== Personal life ==
Oyono was born in Barakaldo (Biscay, Basque Country), Spain to Equatoguinean Fang parents. He holds Spanish and Equatoguinean citizenships.

== Career statistics ==
As of match played 25 August 2024

Appearances and goals by club, season and competition
Club	Season	League			Copa del Rey		Other		Total	
Club	Season	Division	Apps	Goals	Apps	Goals	Apps	Goals	Apps	Goals
Bilbao Athletic	2024–25	Primera Federación	1	0	–		0	0	1	0
Career total			1	0	0	0	0	0	1	0
