= Ramón Martos =

Irish association football player (born 2008)

Personal information
- Full name: Ramón David Martos Pugh
- Date of birth: 20 May 2008 (age 18)
- Place of birth: Dublin, Ireland
- Height: 1.75 m (5 ft 9 in)
- Position: Attacking midfielder

Team information
- Current team: Almería
- Number: 34

Youth career
- –2024: Almería

Senior career*
Years	Team	Apps	(Gls)
2025–	Almería B	3	(0)
2025–	Almería	0	(0)

International career^{‡}
2022–2023	Republic of Ireland U15	11	(2)
2023–2024	Republic of Ireland U16	9	(0)
2024–2025	Republic of Ireland U17	19	(3)
2026–	Republic of Ireland U19	7	(2)
- * Club domestic league appearances and goals as of 22:57, 4 October 2026 (UTC) ‡ National team caps and goals as of 22:23, 4 October 2026 (UTC)

Ramón David Martos Pugh (born 18 March 2008) is an Irish professional footballer who plays as an attacking midfielder for Segunda División club Almería. He is a Republic of Ireland youth international.

== International career ==
Martos is eligible to represent both Ireland, where he was born, and Spain, where his father is from.

He took part in the qualifying rounds for the 2025 UEFA European Under-17 Championship while playing for the Irish team, but they did not qualify for the tournament. Martos scored his first goal for the Republic of Ireland U17s on 11 November 2024, in a 3–0 victory over Scotland. He was named in the squad for the 2025 FIFA U-17 World Cup in Qatar.

On 25 March 2026, Martos made his Republic of Ireland U19s in a 1–1 draw with Poland U19.

== Career statistics ==
As of match played on 3 May 2026

Appearances and goals by club, season and competition
Club	Season	League			National Cup (Note: Includes Copa del Rey)		Other		Total	
Club	Season	Division	Apps	Goals	Apps	Goals	Apps	Goals	Apps	Goals
Almería B	2025–26	Segunda Federación	3	0	—		—		3	0
Career total			3	0	0	0	0	0	3	0
