= Jean Mambuku =

Italian footballer (born 2008)

Jean-Tryfose Mambuku
Personal information
- Full name: Jean-Tryfose Mambuku
- Date of birth: 8 July 2008 (age 18)
- Place of birth: Turin, Italy
- Height: 1.79 m (5 ft 10 in)
- Position: Defender

Team information
- Current team: Reims
- Number: 21

Youth career
- 2016–2017: FCF La Neuvillette-Jamin
- 2017–2026: Reims

Senior career*
Years	Team	Apps	(Gls)
2025–	Reims B	20	(1)
2026–	Reims	12	(0)

International career^{‡}
2023	Italy U15	2	(0)
2025	Italy U17	19	(1)
2025	Italy U18	10	(0)
2026–	Italy U19	3	(0)
Medal record
Men's football
Representing Italy
FIFA U-17 World Cup
Third place	2025 Qatar
- * Club domestic league appearances and goals as of 6 November 2026 ‡ National team caps and goals as of 1 October 2026

Jean-Tryfose Mambuku (born 8 July 2008) is an Italian professional footballer who plays as a defender for Ligue 2 club Reims.

== Early life ==
Mambuku was born on 8 July 2008. Born in Turin, Italy, he started playing football at the age of eight.

== Club career ==
As a youth player, Mambuku joined the youth academy of French side FCF La Neuvillette-Jamin. Following his stint there, he joined the youth academy of French side Reims and was promoted to the club's reserve team ahead of the 2025–26 season.

== International career ==
Mambuku holds dual Italian and DR Congo citizenship, making him eligible to represent either nation internationally, he is an Italy youth international. During the autumn of 2025, he played for the Italy national under-17 football team at the 2025 UEFA European Under-17 Championship, and finished in third place at the 2025 FIFA U-17 World Cup.

== Style of play ==
Mambuku plays as a defender. Italian magazine Sprint e Sport wrote in 2025 that he "his versatility allows him to cover both the right and left flank, a skill that makes him a key player in both phases of play. Gifted with above-average physical power and athletic ability , he is able to sustain a high tempo for the duration of the match. But it is not just his intensity that impresses: Mambuku plays with intelligence, demonstrating an astonishing positional sense".

== Honours ==
Italy U17

- FIFA U-17 World Cup third place: 2025
