= Òscar Gistau =

Spanish footballer (born 2008)

Personal information
- Full name: Òscar Gistau Ferreño
- Date of birth: 8 March 2008 (age 18)
- Place of birth: Salou, Spain
- Height: 1.86 m (6 ft 1 in)
- Position: Striker

Team information
- Current team: Barcelona B
- Number: 29

Youth career
- 2022–: Barcelona

Senior career*
Years	Team	Apps	(Gls)
2024–	Barcelona B	12	(0)

International career^{‡}
2023–2024	Spain U16	6	(3)
2023–	Spain U17	3	(2)
- * Club domestic league appearances and goals as of 15 May 2026 ‡ National team caps and goals as of 03:30, 16 October 2024 (UTC)

Òscar Gistau Ferreño (born 8 March 2008) is a Spanish professional footballer who plays as a striker for Segunda Federación club Barcelona Atlètic.

== Early life ==
Gistau was born in Salou, Tarragona, Catalonia.

== Career ==
Gistau joined the youth academy of F.C. Barcelona La Masia side Barcelona, where he was regarded as one of the club's most important players.

== Style of play ==
Gistau mainly operates as a striker and has been described as "characteristics include his great aerial game, his powerful shot and a goal-scoring nose".

== Personal life ==
Gistau is the son of Spanish footballer Coque Gistau.
