= Samuil Tsonov =

Bulgarian footballer

Personal information
- Full name: Samuil Stoykov Tsonov
- Date of birth: 30 May 2008 (age 18)
- Place of birth: Plovdiv, Bulgaria
- Height: 1.92 m (6 ft 3 1/2 in)
- Positions: Attacking midfielder; forward

Team information
- Current team: Botev Plovdiv
- Number: 13

Youth career
- 2018–2026: Botev Plovdiv

Senior career*
Years	Team	Apps	(Gls)
2025–	Botev Plovdiv II	7	(2)
2025–	Botev Plovdiv	19	(6)

International career^{‡}
2025	Bulgaria U17	3	(1)
2025–	Bulgaria U19	6	(1)
- * Club domestic league appearances and goals as of 21:54, 22 November 2026 (UTC) ‡ National team caps and goals as of 1 June 2026

Samuil Stoykov Tsonov (Bulgarian: Самуил Стойков Цонов; born 30 May 2008) is a Bulgarian professional footballer who plays as a forward or attacking midfielder for First League club Botev Plovdiv.

== Club career ==
Tsonov joined the youth academy of Botev Plovdiv at a young age in 2018 and progressed through the various youth categories of the club's academy. On 8 May 2025, he made his debut for Botev Plovdiv II in the Second League in a 0–2 home loss against Nesebar. On 18 July 2025, he signed his first professional contract.

On 27 July 2025, Tsonov made his First League debut for Botev Plovdiv in a 2–1 away loss against Cherno More at Stadion Ticha.

== Career statistics ==
As of match played 22 November 2026

Appearances and goals by club, season and competition
Club	Season	League			Cup		Europe		Other		Total	
Club	Season	Division	Apps	Goals	Apps	Goals	Apps	Goals	Apps	Goals	Apps	Goals
Botev Plovdiv II	2024–25	Second League	3	0	—		—		—		3	0
Botev Plovdiv II	2026–27	Third League	4	2	—		—		—		4	2
Botev Plovdiv II	Total		7	2	—		—		—		7	2
Botev Plovdiv	2025–26	First League	15	2	1	0	—		—		16	2
Botev Plovdiv	2026–27	First League	4	4	0	0	—		—		4	4
Botev Plovdiv	Total		19	6	1	0	—		—		20	6
Career total			26	8	1	0	0	0	0	0	27	8
