= Gil Neves =

Portuguese footballer (born 2008)

Personal information
- Full name: Gil Matteo Neves
- Date of birth: 9 February 2008 (age 18)
- Place of birth: Luxembourg
- Height: 1.89 m (6 ft 2 in)
- Position: Midfielder

Team information
- Current team: 1. FC Köln
- Number: 31

Youth career
- FC Syra Mensdorf
- Metz
- –2024: F91 Dudelange
- 2024–2026: Benfica

Senior career*
Years	Team	Apps	(Gls)
2026–	1. FC Köln	0	(0)
2026–	→ 1. FC Köln II (res.)	1	(0)

International career^{‡}
2023–2024	Luxembourg U16	8	(1)
2024–2025	Luxembourg U17	10	(0)
2022–2023	Portugal U17	21	(5)
2025–2026	Portugal U18	8	(1)
- * Club domestic league appearances and goals as of 22 August 2026 ‡ National team caps and goals as of 31 March 2026

Gil Matteo Neves (born 9 February 2008) is a professional footballer who plays as a midfielder for Regionalliga West club 1. FC Köln II. Born in Luxembourg, he has represented Luxembourg and Portugal internationally at youth level.

== Early life ==
Neves was born on 9 February 2008. Born in Luxembourg, he grew up in Roodt-sur-Syre, Luxembourg and can speak German.

The son of Rui and Isa, he has a sister and a brother. Growing up, he played volleyball and started playing football at the age of five.

== Club career ==
As a youth player, Neves joined the youth academy of Luxembourgian side FC Syra Mensdorf. Following his stint there, he joined the youth academy of French side Metz at the age of nine. Subsequently, he joined the youth academy of Luxembourgian side F91 Dudelange.

Two years later, he joined the youth academy of Portuguese side Benfica at the age of sixteen, where he played in the UEFA Youth League. Ahead of the 2026–27 season, he signed for German Bundesliga side 1. FC Köln.

== International career ==
Neves has represented Luxembourg and Portugal internationally at youth level and has represented the former internationally at under-16 and under-17 level and has represented the latter internationally at under-17 and under-18 level. Altogether, he made eight appearances and scored one goal while playing for the Luxembourg national under-16 football team.

In 2022 and 2023, he played for the Luxembourg national under-17 football team for 2023 UEFA European Under-17 Championship qualification and 2024 UEFA European Under-17 Championship qualification. During May 2025, he played for the Portugal national under-17 football team at the 2025 UEFA European Under-17 Championship, helping the team win the competition.
