= René Mitongo =

Belgian footballer (born 2008)

Personal information
- Full name: René Mitongo Muteba
- Date of birth: 18 January 2008 (age 18)
- Place of birth: Belgium
- Position: Forward

Team information
- Current team: Estrela da Amadora (on loan from Trabzonspor)
- Number: 49

Youth career
- 2014–2015: KV Mechelen
- 2015–2017: Heist
- 2017–2018: Lierse SK
- 2018–2019: Beveren
- 2019–2020: KAA Gent
- 2020–2025: Standard Liège

Senior career*
Years	Team	Apps	(Gls)
2025–	Standard Liège II	26	(9)
2025–2026	Standard Liège	9	(0)
2026–	Trabzonspor	0	(0)

International career^{‡}
2024	Belgium U16	3	(1)
2024–	Belgium U17	11	(5)
- * Club domestic league appearances and goals as of 31 May 2026 ‡ National team caps and goals as of 01:49, 13 May 2025 (UTC)

René Mitongo Muteba (born 18 January 2008) is a Belgian professional footballer who plays as a forward for Primeira Liga club Estrela da Amadora, on loan from Süper Lig club Trabzonspor.

== Club career ==
=== Early career ===
Mitongo is a product of the youth academies of KV Mechelen, Heist, Lierse SK, Beveren and KAA Gent, before moving to Standard Liège's youth in 2020 to finish his development.

=== Standard Liège ===
On 19 June 2023, he signed his first professional contract with Standard Liège until 2026. He made his senior and professional debut with Standard Liège as a substitute in a 1–0 Belgian Pro League loss to Royal Charleroi on 4 May 2025.

=== Trabzonspor ===
On 29 July 2026, Turkish Süper Lig club Trabzonspor announced the signing of Mitongo for a fee of €3 million. He joined the club on a four-year deal with a club option for a fifth year.

==== Loan to Estrela da Amadora ====
On 4 September 2026, Mitongo joined Portuguese Primeira Liga club Estrela da Amadora, on loan for the 2026–27 season.

== International career ==
Born in Belgium, Mitongo is of DR Congolese descent. He was part of the Belgium U17 squad at the 2025 UEFA European Under-17 Championship.

== Career statistics ==
As of match played 15 August 2026

Appearances and goals by club, season and competition
Club	Season	League			National cup		Europe		Other		Total	
Club	Season	Division	Apps	Goals	Apps	Goals	Apps	Goals	Apps	Goals	Apps	Goals
Standard Liège	2024–25	Belgian Pro League	2	0	0	0	–		–		2	0
Standard Liège	2025–26	Belgian Pro League	7	0	0	0	–		–		7	0
Standard Liège	Total		9	0	0	0	0	0	0	0	9	0
Trabzonspor	2026–27	Süper Lig	0	0	0	0	0	0	0	0	0	0
Career total			9	0	0	0	0	0	0	0	9	0
