= Brody Lee =

Irish footballer (born 2008)

Personal information
- Full name: Brody Lee
- Date of birth: 31 July 2008 (age 18)
- Place of birth: Roscrea, County Tipperary, Ireland
- Height: 1.72 m (5 ft 8 in)
- Position: Forward

Team information
- Current team: Cork City
- Number: 38

Youth career
- Roscrea United
- –2020: Killavilla United
- 2020–2022: Belvedere
- 2022–2025: Shamrock Rovers
- 2025–: Cork City

Senior career*
Years	Team	Apps	(Gls)
2024–2025	Shamrock Rovers	0	(0)
2025–	Cork City	9	(0)

International career^{‡}
2022–2023	Republic of Ireland U15	12	(3)
2023–2024	Republic of Ireland U16	6	(0)
2024–2025	Republic of Ireland U17	17	(2)
2026–	Republic of Ireland U19	2	(0)
- * Club domestic league appearances and goals as of 16:40, 10 November 2026 (UTC) ‡ National team caps and goals as of 12:24, 29 March 2026 (UTC)

Brody Lee (born 31 July 2008) is an Irish professional footballer who plays as a forward for League of Ireland Premier Division club Cork City.

== Club career ==
=== Youth career ===
A native of Roscrea, County Tipperary, he played for local sides Roscrea United and Killavilla United before moving to Dublin side Belvedere in 2020. In February 2022, he signed for the academy of League of Ireland club Shamrock Rovers.

=== Shamrock Rovers ===
Lee's first involvement at senior level with Shamrock Rovers was on 5 February 2024, when he was an unused substitute in a 0–0 draw with Athlone Town in the Leinster Senior Cup. On 7 February 2025, he made his debut in senior football, playing 69 minutes of his side's 4–0 defeat to Dundalk in the Leinster Senior Cup.

=== Cork City ===
Lee made the move to the academy of fellow League of Ireland Premier Division club Cork City on 4 July 2025. 4 days later he played his first game for the club at senior level, coming off the bench in the second half of a 2–1 defeat to Scottish Premiership Champions Celtic in a friendly at Páirc Uí Chaoimh in front of a crowd of 26,580.

On 25 July 2025, he made his League of Ireland Premier Division debut, coming off the bench in a 3–2 defeat to Sligo Rovers at Turners Cross. On 14 August 2025, it was announced that Lee had signed his first professional contract with the club. On 3 October 2025, he replaced Sean Maguire from the bench in his side's win over St Patrick's Athletic in the Semi Final of the FAI Cup, but would miss the Final due to being on international duty at the 2025 FIFA U-17 World Cup.

On 14 April 2026, he scored the first senior goal of his career, the winner in a 2–1 victory over Kerry in the Munster Senior Cup. On 12 May 2026, he was part of the side that won the Munster Senior Cup.

== International career ==
Lee made his debut in international for the Republic of Ireland U15 side on 19 October 2022, scoring the winner in a 2–1 victory over Cyprus U15. He made 6 appearances for the under-16s before making his Republic of Ireland U17 debut on 5 September 2024, in a 2–1 defeat to Denmark U17. Lee was named in the squad for the 2025 FIFA U-17 World Cup in Qatar in November 2025.

== Career statistics ==
As of match played on 16 October 2026

Appearances and goals by club, season and competition
Club	Division	Season	League		National Cup		Europe		Other		Total	
Club	Division	Season	Apps	Goals	Apps	Goals	Apps	Goals	Apps	Goals	Apps	Goals
Shamrock Rovers	2024	LOI Premier Division	0	0	0	0	0 (Note: Appearance(s) in the UEFA Conference League)	0	0 (Note: Appearance(s) in the Leinster Senior Cup)	0	0	0
Shamrock Rovers	2025	LOI Premier Division	0	0	–		0	0	1	0	1	0
Shamrock Rovers	Total		0	0	0	0	0	0	1	0	1	0
Cork City	2025	LOI Premier Division	6	0	1	0	–		–		7	0
Cork City	2026	LOI First Division	3	0	0	0	–		4 (Note: Appearance(s) in the Munster Senior Cup)	1	7	1
Cork City	Total		9	0	1	0	–		4	1	14	1
Career total			9	0	1	0	0	0	5	1	15	1

== Honours ==
Cork City

- Munster Senior Cup: 2025–26
