= Matej Deket =

Bosnian footballer (born 2009)

Personal information
- Date of birth: 1 October 2009 (age 17)
- Place of birth: Banja Luka, Bosnia and Herzegovina
- Height: 1.85 m (6 ft 1 in)
- Position: Forward

Team information
- Current team: Borac Banja Luka
- Number: 89

Youth career
- Borac Banja Luka

Senior career*
Years	Team	Apps	(Gls)
2025–	Borac Banja Luka	33	(10)

International career^{‡}
2023–2024	Bosnia and Herzegovina U15	7	(6)
2024–2025	Bosnia and Herzegovina U17	9	(5)
2026–	Bosnia and Herzegovina U21	4	(1)
- * Club domestic league appearances and goals as of 21 November 2026 ‡ National team caps and goals as of 6 October 2026

Matej Deket (pronounced [mǎtej děket]; born 1 October 2009) is a Bosnian professional footballer who plays as a forward for Bosnian Premier League club Borac Banja Luka.

Deket started his professional career at Borac Banja Luka.

== Club career ==
=== Early career ===
Deket came through the youth academy of his hometown club Borac Banja Luka. He made his professional debut against Rudar Prijedor on 5 October 2025 at the age of 16. On 14 February 2026, he scored his first professional goal in a triumph over Zrinjski Mostar.

== International career ==
Deket represented Bosnia and Herzegovina at varios youth levels. He also served as a captain of the under-17 team under coach Asmir Avdukić.

In October 2026, he received his first senior call up, for 2026–27 UEFA Nations League B games against Sweden and Romania.

== Career statistics ==
=== Club ===
As of match played 21 November 2026

Appearances and goals by club, season and competition
Club	Season	League			Bosnian Cup		Continental		Total	
Club	Season	Division	Apps	Goals	Apps	Goals	Apps	Goals	Apps	Goal
Borac Banja Luka	2025–26	Bosnian Premier League	21	5	1	0	–		22	5
Borac Banja Luka	2026–27	Bosnian Premier League	13	5	0	0	11 (Note: Two appearances in UEFA Champions League; nine appearances, two goals in UEFA Conference League)	2	23	7
Borac Banja Luka	Total		33	10	1	0	11	2	45	12

== Honours ==
Borac Banja Luka

- Bosnian Premier League: 2025–26
