= Bernardo Lima =

Portuguese footballer (born 2008)

Personal information
- Full name: Bernardo Pinto Lima
- Date of birth: 26 March 2008 (age 18)
- Place of birth: São João da Madeira, Portugal
- Position: Midfielder

Team information
- Current team: Porto B
- Number: 66

Youth career
- –2016: Sanjoanense
- 2016–: Porto

Senior career*
Years	Team	Apps	(Gls)
2025–	Porto B	17	(2)
2026–	Porto	1	(0)

International career^{‡}
2022	Portugal U15	3	(1)
2024	Portugal U16	2	(0)
2024–	Portugal U17	20	(2)
2025–	Portugal U18	5	(0)
Medal record
Men's football
Representing Portugal
FIFA U-17 World Cup
Winner	2025 Qatar
UEFA European Under-17 Championship
Winner	2025 Albania
- * Club domestic league appearances and goals as of 19 June 2026 ‡ National team caps and goals as of 14 October 2025

Bernardo Pinto Lima (born 26 March 2008) is a Portuguese professional footballer who plays as a midfielder for Porto B.

== Early life ==
Lima was born on 26 March 2008. Born in São João da Madeira, Portugal, he is a native of the city.

== Club career ==
As a youth player, Lima joined the youth academy of Sanjoanense. Following his stint there, he joined the youth academy of Porto in 2016 and was promoted to the club's reserve team.

== International career ==
Lima is a Portugal youth international. During May and June 2025, he played for the Portugal national under-17 football team at the 2025 UEFA European Under-17 Championship.

== Style of play ==
Lima plays as a midfielder. Portuguese newspaper A Bola wrote in 2025 that he is a "pure central midfielder, with a full understanding of the terrain he's playing in, great passing quality, and clear decision-making".

== Honours ==
Portugal U17

- FIFA U-17 World Cup: 2025
- UEFA European Under-17 Championship: 2025
