= Pedro Rodríguez (footballer, born 2008) =

Spanish footballer (born 2008)

Personal information
- Full name: Pedro Rodríguez Iglesias
- Date of birth: 20 January 2008 (age 18)
- Place of birth: Ogíjares, Spain
- Height: 1.75 m (5 ft 9 in)
- Position: Midfielder

Team information
- Current team: Barcelona B
- Number: 8

Youth career
- Ogíjares 89
- Granada
- 2019–2026: Barcelona

Senior career*
Years	Team	Apps	(Gls)
2025–	Barcelona B	3	(0)

International career
2022–2023	Spain U15	8	(0)
2023–2024	Spain U16	6	(0)
2024–	Spain U17	15	(2)
- * Club domestic league appearances and goals as of 17:44, 24 May 2025 (UTC)

Pedro Rodríguez Iglesias (born 20 January 2008) is a Spanish professional footballer who plays as a midfielder for Segunda Federación club Barcelona Atlètic.

== Club career ==
Born in Ogíjares in Spain's Province of Granada, Rodríguez began his career with local club Ogíjares 89 before joining the academy of Granada. In 2019, at the age of eleven, he moved to Barcelona's La Masia academy. Having struggled initially to settle, the suspension of football due to the COVID-19 pandemic in Spain meant that he returned to play in the club's under-14 side under coach Albert Puig, where he showed rapid improvement.

He signed a new contract with the club on 4 June 2024, reportedly rejecting offers from other European clubs in the process. In August 2024, following impressive performances for the Cadet and Juvenil B sides of Barcelona's academy, he was promoted to the Barcelona Atlètic squad—a path also taken by fellow youth player Marc Bernal. He made his debut for the club's B team in the same month, starting in Barcelona's 2–1 Primera Federación loss to Andorra.

Rodríguez' goal in the third minute of the semi-final of the Copa del Rey Juvenil de Fútbol against Real Betis in March 2025 helped Barcelona to a 2–0 win. The following month he helped the club's under-19 side to the UEFA Youth League title, beating Turkish opposition Trabzonspor 4–1 in the final on 28 April 2025.

== Style of play ==
A midfielder, Rodríguez is capable of playing in both offensive and defensive roles. Spanish newspaper Sport's journalist Jaume Marcet described Rodríguez as a player who "controls the ball like few others, moves it quickly and judiciously", comparing him to former and current Barcelona players Xavi and Pedri, respectively.

== Career statistics ==
=== Club ===
As of 24 May 2025.

Appearances and goals by club, season and competition
Club	Season	League			Cup		Other		Total	
Club	Season	Division	Apps	Goals	Apps	Goals	Apps	Goals	Apps	Goals
Barcelona B	2024–25	Primera Federación	3	0	0	0	0	0	3	0
Career total			3	0	0	0	0	0	3	0
