= Charlie Pavey =

Swedish footballer (born 2008)

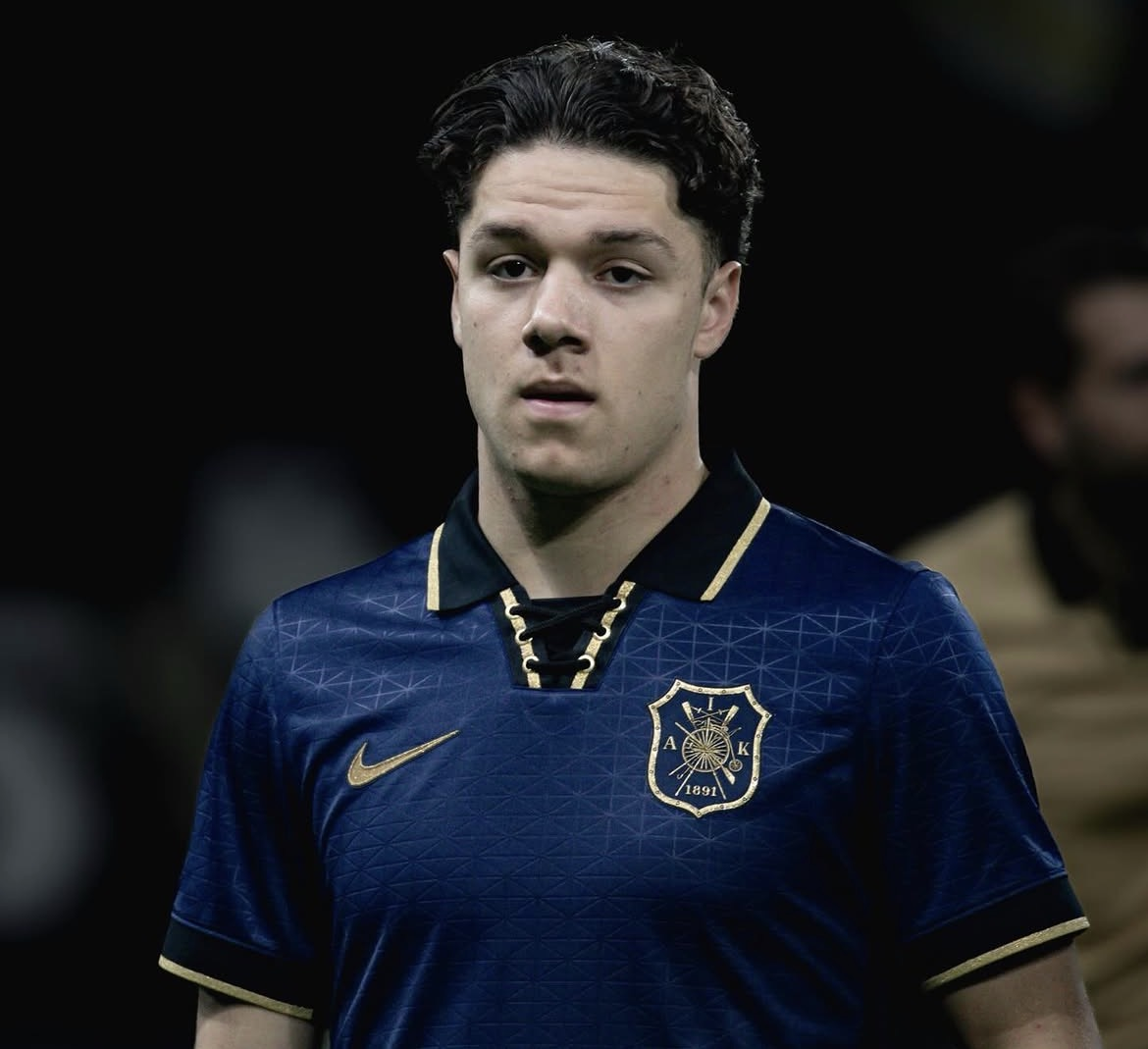
- Pavey with AIK in 2026

Personal information
- Full name: Charlie Steven Brian Pavey
- Date of birth: 7 June 2008 (age 18)
- Place of birth: Solna, Sweden
- Height: 1.78 m (5 ft 10 in)
- Position: Right-back

Team information
- Current team: AIK
- Number: 12

Youth career
- 2012–2025: AIK

Senior career*
Years	Team	Apps	(Gls)
2025–	AIK	6	(1)

International career^{‡}
2023–2025	Sweden U17	21	(2)
2025–	Sweden U19	11	(2)
- * Club domestic league appearances and goals as of 09:17, 7 April 2026 (UTC) ‡ National team caps and goals as of 09:17, 7 April 2026 (UTC)

Charlie Steven Brian Pavey (born 7 June 2008) is a Swedish professional footballer who plays as a right-back for Allsvenskan club AIK.

== Club career ==
=== AIK ===
Pavey began playing football at the age of four with his hometown club AIK.

During the 2023 season, Pavey made his debut for the club's P19 team at just 15 years old. In the same season, he also helped secure the Swedish Championship title in the P16 Allsvenskan.

On 7 January 2025, Pavey signed his first senior team contract with AIK. The deal ran until 31 December 2027. According to reports, Pavey had previously turned down offers from several foreign clubs, including PSV Eindhoven, choosing instead to commit his future to AIK.

He made his debut for the club on 31 July 2025 in the qualification round of the UEFA Europa Conference League against Paide Linnameeskond at Strawberry Arena, a match that AIK won convincingly 6–0 (8–0 on aggregate). Pavey came on as a substitute in the 58th minute for Sotirios Papagiannopoulos and played the remainder of the match as the team's right wing-back.

Pavey made his Allsvenskan debut on 5 April 2026, starting the match and playing 69 minutes as AIK secured a 2–1 victory over Halmstads BK in their season opener, courtesy of goals from Ibrahim Cissé and Zadok Yohanna.

On 8 November 2026, Pavey scored his first senior goal in a 3–2 victory against BK Häcken at Strawberry Arena, assisted by Axel Kouame.

== Personal life ==
Born in Sweden to English parents, Charlie Pavey is a Swedish national and also holds British citizenship through his parents. He is the son of former professional footballer and AIK legend Kenny Pavey.

== Career statistics ==
As of match played 4 May 2026

Appearances and goals by club, season and competition
Club	Season	League			National cup		Europe		Total	
Club	Season	Division	Apps	Goals	Apps	Goals	Apps	Goals	Apps	Goals
AIK	2025	Allsvenskan	0	0	0	0	1 (Note: Appearances in UEFA Conference League)	0	1	0
AIK	2026	Allsvenskan	5	0	3	0	0	0	8	0
Career total			5	0	3	0	1	0	9	0
