= Finlay Gorman =

English footballer (born 2008)

Personal information
- Full name: Finlay Ellis Gorman
- Date of birth: 20 September 2008 (age 18)
- Place of birth: Kingston upon Hull, England
- Position: Midfielder

Team information
- Current team: Manchester City

Youth career
- –2023: Leeds United
- 2023–: Manchester City

Senior career*
Years	Team	Apps	(Gls)
2024–	Manchester City	0	(0)

International career^{‡}
2023–2024	England U16	5	(1)
2024–	England U17	8	(3)
2025–	England U18	6	(0)
- * Club domestic league appearances and goals as of 20:58, 21 December 2024 (UTC) ‡ National team caps and goals as of 14:37, 3 June 2026 (UTC)

Finlay Ellis Gorman (born 20 September 2008) is an English professional footballer who plays as a midfielder for Manchester City.

== Club career ==
Gorman joined the youth academy of Manchester City from Leeds United in 2023 for a reported upfront fee of £1.5 million, a British record for a 15-year-old. He held the record for the youngest player to score twice in a Premier League Under-18 fixture, at 14 years and 326 days. The deal also included longer-term add-ons and incentives which could potentially rise to a total fee in excess of £5million ($6.2m).

He featured for the club as they reached the FA Youth Cup final during the 2024-25 season, his efforts including a hat trick in their quarter final.

== International career ==
Gorman is an England youth international, and made his England Under-16 debut when he was still 14-years-old. He was a member of the England U17 squad at the 2025 UEFA European Under-17 Championship and provided two assists in their last game of the tournament against Czech Republic as England were eliminated at the group stage.

On 3 September 2025, Gorman made his England U18 debut during a 3-1 win over Uzbekistan.

== Style of play ==
Gorman has been praised for his passing ability and versatility, being able to play a number of different positions in the attacking third of the pitch.
