= Alberto Velásquez =

Finnish footballer (born 2008)

Personal information
- Date of birth: 2 July 2008 (age 18)
- Place of birth: Helsinki, Finland
- Height: 1.79 m (5 ft 10 in)
- Position: Centre forward

Team information
- Current team: Midtjylland

Youth career
- –2023: HJK
- 2023–2024: Honka
- 2024–: Midtjylland

Senior career*
Years	Team	Apps	(Gls)
2024	Honka	11	(9)

International career^{‡}
2022–2023	Finland U15	10	(6)
2023	Peru U15	2	(1)
2024–	Finland U16	3	(0)
2024–	Finland U17	15	(8)
- * Club domestic league appearances and goals as of 30 June 2024 ‡ National team caps and goals as of 18 March 2025

Alberto Velásquez (born 2 July 2008) is a Peruvian-Finnish footballer who plays as centre forward for U19 team of Danish club Midtjylland.

== Youth career ==
Velásquez started playing football in HJK Helsinki youth team in Töölö. He played in the club's academy, before switching teams in the summer 2023 and joining Honka youth sector in Tapiola, Espoo.

== Club career ==
Velaśquez made his senior debut with Honka in April 2024, playing in the fourth-tier Kakkonen. During the season, he scored nine goals in 11 league matches, before leaving in July.

On 3 July 2024, he joined Midtjylland in Denmark on a deal until June 2027 for an undisclosed fee. He was first assigned to the club's U17 and U19 teams.

== International career ==
Velásquez has represented both Finland and Peru at under-15 youth international level. Since January 2024, he plays for Finland U17 national team. On 1 March 2024, Velásquez scored a hat trick, in a 4–1 friendly win against Iceland U17.

== Personal life ==
Velásquez was born in Helsinki, Finland, to a Finnish mother and a Peruvian father.

== Career statistics ==
As of 6 July 2024.

Appearances and goals by club, season and competition
Club	Season	League			Cup (Note: Includes Suomen Cup)		Continental		Other		Total	
Club	Season	Division	Apps	Goals	Apps	Goals	Apps	Goals	Apps	Goals	Apps	Goals
Honka	2024	Kakkonen	11	9	1	0	–		–		12	9
Career total			11	9	1	0	0	0	0	0	12	9
