= Brodie Dair =

Scottish association football player (born 2008)

Personal information
- Date of birth: 1 June 2008 (age 18)
- Position: Forward

Team information
- Current team: Queen of the South (on loan from Fulham)
- Number: 11

Youth career
- –2025: St Johnstone
- 2025-: Fulham

Senior career*
Years	Team	Apps	(Gls)
2025–	Fulham	0	(0)
2026-	→ Queen of the South (loan)	6	(0)

International career^{‡}
2024–	Scotland U17	3	(1)
- * Club domestic league appearances and goals as of 22:16, 20 May 2025 (UTC) ‡ National team caps and goals as of 16:40, 20 May 2025 (UTC)

Brodie Dair (born 1 June 2008) is a Scottish professional footballer who plays for Queen of the South on loan from Premier League club Fulham, as a forward.

== Club career ==
=== St Johnstone ===
Dair scored the winning goal in a 2023 Scottish Youth Cup quarter-final for St Johnstone at the age of just 14 years-old. He signed a two-year contract with the club in the summer of 2024, and played regularly for the St Johnstone under-18 side and featured for the B Team in their Scottish Challenge Cup loss against East Fife during the 2024-25 season. During his time at St Johnstone, he made several appearances on the substitutes bench for the first team while they competed in the Scottish Premiership during the first part of the 2024-25 season.

=== Fulham ===
It was reported in January 2025, that St Johnstone had accepted a bid from Premier League club Fulham for his transfer. He officially joined the academy at Fulham in February 2025.

==== Queen of the South (loan) ====
In July 2026, he joined Scottish club Queen of the South on a season-long loan.

== International career ==
He has featured for the Scotland national under-17 football team.

== Personal life ==
Dair is the son of former footballer Lee Dair, and is also related to former footballers Jason Dair and Jim Baxter.
