= Jessi Da Silva =

Belgian footballer (born 2008)

Personal information
- Full name: Jessi Rémy-Nzuzi Pedro Da Silva
- Date of birth: 15 April 2008 (age 18)
- Place of birth: Evere, Belgium
- Position: Right winger

Team information
- Current team: Club NXT
- Number: 72

Youth career
- 2014–2018: Stade Everois RC
- 2018–2019: Diegem Sport
- 2019–2023: Club Brugge

Senior career*
Years	Team	Apps	(Gls)
2023–	Club NXT	46	(1)

International career^{‡}
2023–	Belgium U15	7	(0)
2023–2024	Belgium U16	4	(0)
2024–2025	Belgium U17	16	(1)
2025–	Belgium U18	2	(0)
- * Club domestic league appearances and goals as of 20 April 2026 ‡ National team caps and goals as of 26 August 2023

Jessi Rémy-Nzuzi Pedro Da Silva (born 15 April 2008) is a Belgian professional footballer who plays as a right winger for Club NXT, the reserve team of Club Brugge. He is a Belgium youth international.

== Club career ==
In 2019, Da Silva moved from the youth academy of Diegem Sport to that of Club Brugge. In July 2023, he signed his first professional contract with the club.

On 25 August 2023, he made his professional debut for Club NXT in the Belgian First Division B: on the third matchday of the season, coach Nicky Hayen brought him on in the 85th minute. At the time, Da Silva was only 15 years, 4 months, and 10 days old, making him the youngest player ever in Belgian professional football—just two weeks after Nunzio Engwanda had become the first 15-year-old to appear in the First Division B.

== Career statistics ==
As of 26 August 2023

Season	Club	League	League	Cup	Europe	Other	Total					
			Apps	Goals	Apps	Goals	Apps	Goals	Apps	Goals	Apps	Goals
2023–24	Club NXT	First Division B	1	0	0	0	0	0	0	0	1	0
Career total			1	0	0	0	0	0	0	0	1	0
