= 2025 UEFA European Under-17 Championship squads =

Football tournament squads

This article describes about the squads for the 2025 UEFA European Under-17 Championship in Albania. Each national team had to submit a squad of 20 players born on or after 1 January 2008.

All ages are as of 19 May 2025, the day before the start of tournament.

== Group A ==
=== Albania ===
Head coach: (Italy) Andrea Tedesco

The squad was announced on 17 May 2025.

No.	Pos.	Player	Date of birth (age)	Club
1	GK	Raffaele Huli	30 July 2008 (aged 16)	(Italian Football Federation) Juventus
12	GK	Daniel Çuli	24 October 2008 (aged 16)	(Italian Football Federation) Ternana
2	DF	Darli Kurti	12 April 2008 (aged 17)	(Italian Football Federation) Entella
3	DF	Kris Gecaj	14 November 2008 (aged 16)	(Italian Football Federation) Juventus
5	DF	Lucas Çekrezi	5 March 2008 (aged 17)	(Italian Football Federation) Torino
6	DF	Fabjano Nuhaj	6 April 2008 (aged 17)	(Hellenic Football Federation) Olympiacos
13	DF	Fabian Hallidri	13 July 2008 (aged 16)	(Italian Football Federation) Hellas Verona
16	DF	Leon Sylejmani	30 May 2008 (aged 16)	(Swiss Football Association) Servette
17	DF	Hassan Haradini	31 July 2008 (aged 16)	(German Football Association) Rot-Weiss Essen
4	MF	Andreas Llana	26 January 2008 (aged 17)	(Hellenic Football Federation) Olympiacos
7	MF	Rikardo Sheji	5 March 2008 (aged 17)	(Italian Football Federation) Torino
8	MF	Evangjelos Gjoka	26 July 2008 (aged 16)	(Hellenic Football Federation) PAOK
10	MF	Alen Vukaj	22 January 2008 (aged 17)	(Italian Football Federation) Inter
14	MF	Dijar Ferati	24 September 2008 (aged 16)	(Portuguese Football Federation) Rio Ave
15	MF	Alex Ramku	20 May 2008 (aged 16)	(Italian Football Federation) Udinese
20	MF	Enis Rexhepi	12 March 2008 (aged 17)	(German Football Association) Stuttgart
9	FW	Gabriel Kulla	20 February 2008 (aged 17)	(Italian Football Federation) Sassuolo
11	FW	Arman Durmishi	25 June 2008 (aged 16)	(Italian Football Federation) Juventus
18	FW	Dajan Durmishi	25 June 2008 (aged 16)	(Italian Football Federation) Juventus
19	FW	Leon Myrtaj	28 March 2008 (aged 17)	(The Football Association) Tottenham

=== France ===
Head coach: Lionel Rouxel

The squad was announced on 6 May 2025.

No.	Pos.	Player	Date of birth (age)	Club
1	GK	Ilan Jourdren	17 July 2008 (aged 16)	(French Football Federation) Lens
16	GK	Léo-Paul Bouyer	14 August 2008 (aged 16)	(Italian Football Federation) Milan
2	DF	David Boly	22 January 2009 (aged 16)	(French Football Federation) PSG
3	DF	Lucas Batbedat	1 August 2008 (aged 16)	(French Football Federation) PSG
4	DF	Elikya Legros	6 June 2008 (aged 16)	(French Football Federation) Auxerre
5	DF	Emmanuel Mbemba	20 March 2008 (aged 17)	(French Football Federation) PSG
12	DF	Kyllian Antonio	4 January 2008 (aged 17)	(French Football Federation) Lens
13	DF	Hermann Diandaga	8 January 2008 (aged 17)	(French Football Federation) PSG
14	DF	Tom Raiani	15 April 2008 (aged 17)	(French Football Federation) Nantes
6	MF	Abdoulaye Camara	28 September 2008 (aged 16)	(French Football Federation) Montpellier
8	MF	Paul Eymard	5 January 2008 (aged 17)	(French Football Federation) Saint-Étienne
15	MF	Believe Munongo	23 November 2009 (aged 15)	(French Football Federation) Metz
17	MF	Djibril Coulibaly	18 November 2008 (aged 16)	(French Football Federation) Nice
18	MF	Rudy Matondo	13 March 2008 (aged 17)	(French Football Federation) Auxerre
7	FW	Rémi Himbert	29 February 2008 (aged 17)	(French Football Federation) Lyon
9	FW	Djylian N'Guessan	30 August 2008 (aged 16)	(French Football Federation) Saint-Étienne
10	FW	Ilyas Azizi	13 April 2008 (aged 17)	(French Football Federation) Toulouse
11	FW	Milan Leccese	30 November 2008 (aged 16)	(French Football Federation) Marseille
19	FW	Sanah Camara	8 April 2008 (aged 17)	(French Football Federation) Nantes
20	FW	Christ Batola	3 June 2009 (aged 15)	(French Football Federation) Troyes

=== Germany ===
Head coach: Marc-Patrick Meister

The squad was announced on 5 May 2025.

No.	Pos.	Player	Date of birth (age)	Club
1	GK	Marcello Trippel	3 January 2008 (aged 17)	(German Football Association) Borussia Mönchengladbach
23	GK	Tjark Möbius	29 July 2008 (aged 16)	(German Football Association) Magdeburg
2	DF	Natnael Abraha	14 March 2008 (aged 17)	(German Football Association) Eintracht Frankfurt
3	DF	Osman Turay	17 March 2008 (aged 17)	(German Football Association) Schalke 04
4	DF	Elias Vali Fard	15 January 2008 (aged 17)	(German Football Association) Borussia Mönchengladbach
5	DF	Ben Hawighorst	1 March 2008 (aged 17)	(German Football Association) Bayer Leverkusen
13	DF	Nebe Sirak Domnic	16 November 2008 (aged 16)	(German Football Association) Bayer Leverkusen
15	DF	Raphael Pavlic	9 February 2008 (aged 17)	(German Football Association) Bayern Munich
6	MF	Mussa Kaba	17 November 2008 (aged 16)	(German Football Association) Borussia Dortmund
8	MF	Mathieu Nguefack	14 May 2008 (aged 17)	(German Football Association) Borussia Mönchengladbach
10	MF	Lennart Karl	22 February 2008 (aged 17)	(German Football Association) Bayern Munich
11	MF	Moritz Göttlicher	21 April 2008 (aged 17)	(German Football Association) Bayern Munich
16	MF	Jeremiah Mensah	21 February 2008 (aged 17)	(German Football Association) Bayer Leverkusen
18	MF	Lasse Isbruch	15 June 2008 (aged 16)	(German Football Association) Bochum
7	FW	Can Armando Güner	7 January 2008 (aged 17)	(German Football Association) Borussia Mönchengladbach
9	FW	Alexander Staff	12 June 2008 (aged 16)	(German Football Association) Eintracht Frankfurt
17	FW	Salvatore Mule	24 January 2008 (aged 17)	(German Football Association) Stuttgart
19	FW	Keziah Oteng-Mensah	31 March 2008 (aged 17)	(German Football Association) Eintracht Frankfurt
20	FW	David Creta	27 April 2008 (aged 17)	(German Football Association) Hoffenheim
21	FW	Wisdom Mike	24 September 2008 (aged 16)	(German Football Association) Bayern Munich

=== Portugal ===
Head coach: Bino Maçães

The squad was announced on 14 May 2025.

No.	Pos.	Player	Date of birth (age)	Club
1	GK	Romário Cunha	21 March 2008 (aged 17)	(Portuguese Football Federation) Braga
12	GK	Alexandre Tverdohlebov	16 January 2008 (aged 17)	(Portuguese Football Federation) Sporting
2	DF	Gabriel Dbouk	6 February 2008 (aged 17)	(Portuguese Football Federation) Braga
3	DF	Martim Chelmik	13 June 2008 (aged 16)	(Portuguese Football Federation) Porto
4	DF	Mauro Furtado	30 July 2008 (aged 16)	(Portuguese Football Federation) Benfica
5	DF	José Neto	19 April 2008 (aged 17)	(Portuguese Football Federation) Benfica
13	DF	Daniel Banjaqui	24 March 2008 (aged 17)	(Portuguese Football Federation) Benfica
14	DF	Ricardo Neto	26 August 2008 (aged 16)	(Portuguese Football Federation) Benfica
15	DF	Yoan Pereira	8 April 2008 (aged 17)	(Portuguese Football Federation) Porto
6	MF	Rafael Quintas	8 March 2008 (aged 17)	(Portuguese Football Federation) Benfica
8	MF	Zeega	5 November 2008 (aged 16)	(Portuguese Football Federation) Vitória
16	MF	Santiago Verdi	5 May 2008 (aged 17)	(Portuguese Football Federation) Vitória
18	MF	Bernardo Lima	26 March 2008 (aged 17)	(Portuguese Football Federation) Porto
19	MF	Tomás Soares	19 January 2008 (aged 17)	(Portuguese Football Federation) Benfica
20	MF	Miguel Figueiredo	2 August 2008 (aged 16)	(Portuguese Football Federation) Benfica
7	FW	Duarte Cunha	25 January 2008 (aged 17)	(Portuguese Football Federation) Porto
9	FW	Anísio Cabral	15 February 2008 (aged 17)	(Portuguese Football Federation) Benfica
10	FW	Mateus Mide	10 May 2008 (aged 17)	(Portuguese Football Federation) Porto
11	FW	Stevan Manuel	11 June 2008 (aged 16)	(Portuguese Football Federation) Benfica
17	FW	João Aragão	24 March 2008 (aged 17)	(Portuguese Football Federation) Braga

== Group B ==
=== Belgium ===
Head coach: Bob Browaeys

The squad was announced on 9 May 2025.

No.	Pos.	Player	Date of birth (age)	Club
1	GK	Lucca Brughmans	27 June 2008 (aged 16)	(Royal Belgian Football Association) Genk
12	GK	Martin Henrion	2 March 2008 (aged 17)	(Royal Dutch Football Association) Ajax
2	DF	Arthur De Kimpe	2 May 2008 (aged 17)	(Royal Belgian Football Association) OH Leuven
3	DF	Brent Jonkers	11 March 2008 (aged 17)	(Royal Dutch Football Association) PSV
4	DF	Wout Gielen	5 April 2008 (aged 17)	(Italian Football Federation) Juventus
5	DF	Lucca Darcon	6 February 2008 (aged 17)	(Royal Belgian Football Association) OH Leuven
13	DF	Pablo Capilla Rivera	20 November 2008 (aged 16)	(Royal Belgian Football Association) Gent
14	DF	Axl Wins	5 July 2008 (aged 16)	(Royal Belgian Football Association) Club Brugge
6	MF	Nathan De Cat	19 July 2008 (aged 16)	(Royal Belgian Football Association) Anderlecht
8	MF	August De Wannemacker	25 December 2008 (aged 16)	(Royal Belgian Football Association) Genk
10	MF	Noah Fernandez	9 January 2008 (aged 17)	(Royal Dutch Football Association) PSV
15	MF	Matthias Wamu Oyatambwe	22 October 2008 (aged 16)	(Royal Belgian Football Association) Genk
16	MF	Naïm Amengai	9 February 2008 (aged 17)	(Royal Belgian Football Association) Club Brugge
17	MF	Loïc Alvarez Fernandez	29 January 2008 (aged 17)	(Hellenic Football Federation) OFI
7	FW	Jessi Da Silva	15 April 2008 (aged 17)	(Royal Belgian Football Association) Club Brugge
9	FW	Stan Naert	2 February 2008 (aged 17)	(Royal Belgian Football Association) Club Brugge
11	FW	Jesse Bisiwu	22 January 2008 (aged 17)	(Royal Belgian Football Association) Club Brugge
18	FW	Ali Camara	13 January 2008 (aged 17)	(Royal Belgian Football Association) Genk
19	FW	René Mitongo Muteba	18 January 2008 (aged 17)	(Royal Belgian Football Association) Standard
20	FW	Aaron Murenzi	23 May 2008 (aged 16)	(Royal Belgian Football Association) Genk

=== Czech Republic ===
Head coach: Pavel Drsek

The squad was announced on 5 May 2025.

No.	Pos.	Player	Date of birth (age)	Club
1	GK	Petr Kuchař	18 February 2008 (aged 17)	(Football Association of the Czech Republic) Baník Ostrava
23	GK	Adam Paar	5 April 2008 (aged 17)	(Football Association of the Czech Republic) Slavia Prague
3	DF	Matyáš Syrovátka	1 April 2008 (aged 17)	(Football Association of the Czech Republic) Hradec Králové
4	DF	David Barčot	10 April 2009 (aged 16)	(Football Association of the Czech Republic) Slavia Prague
5	DF	Martin Kovář	7 February 2008 (aged 17)	(Football Association of the Czech Republic) Slavia Prague
13	DF	Sebastian Pech	5 January 2009 (aged 16)	(Football Association of the Czech Republic) Sparta Prague
15	DF	Filip Capka	21 March 2008 (aged 17)	(Football Association of the Czech Republic) Sigma Olomouc
18	DF	Jonáš Topič	8 June 2008 (aged 16)	(Football Association of the Czech Republic) Sparta Prague
6	MF	Tomáš Škubala	27 February 2008 (aged 17)	(Football Association of the Czech Republic) Baník Ostrava
8	MF	Lukáš Vaněk	13 January 2008 (aged 17)	(Football Association of the Czech Republic) Hradec Králové
10	MF	Kryštof Čížek	4 January 2008 (aged 17)	(German Football Association) Hoffenheim
14	MF	Jan Janega	4 July 2008 (aged 16)	(German Football Association) Mainz 05
19	MF	Hugo Sochůrek	7 June 2008 (aged 16)	(Football Association of the Czech Republic) Sparta Prague
20	MF	Martin Palaščák	25 March 2008 (aged 17)	(Football Association of the Czech Republic) Slavia Prague
7	FW	Matouš Srb	1 September 2009 (aged 15)	(Football Association of the Czech Republic) Slavia Prague
9	FW	Vít Škrkoň	9 April 2008 (aged 17)	(Football Association of the Czech Republic) Baník Ostrava
11	FW	Dominik Zajac	21 June 2008 (aged 16)	(Football Association of the Czech Republic) Baník Ostrava
17	FW	Martin Zeman	27 October 2008 (aged 16)	(Football Association of the Czech Republic) Dynamo České Budějovice
21	FW	Matyáš Tomek	1 November 2008 (aged 16)	(Football Association of the Czech Republic) Vysočina Jihlava
22	FW	Petr Potměšil	19 January 2008 (aged 17)	(Football Association of the Czech Republic) Slavia Prague

=== England ===
Head coach: Neil Ryan

The squad was announced on 12 May 2025.

No.	Pos.	Player	Date of birth (age)	Club
1	GK	Jack Porter	15 July 2008 (aged 16)	(The Football Association) Arsenal
13	GK	Lanre Awesu	25 January 2008 (aged 17)	(The Football Association) West Ham
2	DF	Bradley Burrowes	4 March 2008 (aged 17)	(The Football Association) Aston Villa
3	DF	Dean Benamar	31 May 2008 (aged 16)	(The Football Association) Crystal Palace
5	DF	Kaden Braithwaite	8 February 2008 (aged 17)	(The Football Association) Manchester City
6	DF	Jun'ai Byfield	6 December 2008 (aged 16)	(The Football Association) Tottenham
12	DF	Freddie Simmonds	9 March 2008 (aged 17)	(The Football Association) Brighton & Hove Albion
15	DF	Malachi Hardy	10 March 2008 (aged 17)	(The Football Association) Tottenham
4	MF	Landon Emenalo	18 January 2008 (aged 17)	(The Football Association) Chelsea
8	MF	Seth Ridgeon	12 September 2008 (aged 16)	(The Football Association) Fulham
10	MF	Max Dowman	31 December 2009 (aged 15)	(The Football Association) Arsenal
14	MF	Luca Williams-Barnett	1 October 2008 (aged 16)	(The Football Association) Tottenham
16	MF	Louis Page	24 October 2008 (aged 16)	(The Football Association) Leicester
18	MF	Finlay Gorman	20 September 2008 (aged 16)	(The Football Association) Manchester City
7	FW	Harry Howell	20 April 2008 (aged 17)	(The Football Association) Brighton & Hove Albion
9	FW	Alejandro Gomes Rodriguez	11 March 2008 (aged 17)	(French Football Federation) Lyon
11	FW	Reigan Heskey	19 January 2008 (aged 17)	(The Football Association) Manchester City
17	FW	Ryan McAidoo	24 June 2008 (aged 16)	(The Football Association) Manchester City
19	FW	Rio Ngumoha	29 August 2008 (aged 16)	(The Football Association) Liverpool
20	FW	Harry Gray	8 October 2008 (aged 16)	(The Football Association) Leeds

=== Italy ===
Head coach: Massimiliano Favo

The squad was announced on 15 May 2025.

No.	Pos.	Player	Date of birth (age)	Club
1	GK	Sebastiano Nava	19 May 2008 (aged 17)	(Italian Football Federation) Juventus
12	GK	Andrea Maran	18 February 2008 (aged 17)	(Italian Football Federation) Modena
2	DF	Dauda Iddrisa	8 January 2008 (aged 17)	(The Football Association) West Bromwich Albion
3	DF	Laurence Giani	11 March 2008 (aged 17)	(The Football Association) Stoke City
5	DF	Leonardo Bovio	4 February 2008 (aged 17)	(Italian Football Federation) Inter
6	DF	Benit Borasio	20 January 2008 (aged 17)	(Italian Football Federation) Juventus
13	DF	Jean Mambuku	8 July 2008 (aged 16)	(French Football Federation) Stade de Reims
15	DF	Cristiano De Paoli	27 January 2008 (aged 17)	(Italian Football Federation) Udinese
16	DF	Davide Pavesi	15 February 2008 (aged 17)	(Italian Football Federation) Cremonese
4	MF	Vincenzo Prisco	7 August 2008 (aged 16)	(Italian Football Federation) Napoli
8	MF	Christian Comotto	25 April 2008 (aged 17)	(Italian Football Federation) Milan
11	MF	Andrea Luongo	16 February 2008 (aged 17)	(Italian Football Federation) Torino
14	MF	Alessio Baralla	5 February 2008 (aged 17)	(Italian Football Federation) Empoli
17	MF	Valerio Maccaroni	3 June 2008 (aged 16)	(Italian Football Federation) Roma
18	MF	Federico Steffanoni	4 September 2008 (aged 16)	(Italian Football Federation) Atalanta
7	FW	Destiny Elimoghale	23 April 2009 (aged 16)	(Italian Football Federation) Juventus
9	FW	Thomas Campaniello	29 February 2008 (aged 17)	(Italian Football Federation) Empoli
10	FW	Samuele Inácio	2 April 2008 (aged 17)	(German Football Association) Borussia Dortmund
19	FW	Antonio Arena	10 February 2009 (aged 16)	(Italian Football Federation) Pescara
20	FW	Edoardo Zanaga	13 March 2008 (aged 17)	(Italian Football Federation) Empoli
