= S.L. Benfica B =

Portuguese association football team

Benfica B
- Full name: Sport Lisboa e Benfica "B"
- Nicknames: As Águias (The Eagles); Os Encarnados (The Reds)
- Founded: 1999
- Ground: Benfica Campus
- Capacity: 2,644
- President: Rui Costa
- Head coach: Nélson Veríssimo
- League: Liga Portugal 2
- 2025–26: Liga Portugal 2, 10th of 18
- Website: slbenfica.pt/equipa_b
| Home colours | Away colours | Third colours |

Sport Lisboa e Benfica "B" (Portuguese pronunciation: [sɨˈpɔɾ liʒˈβoɐ i βɐ̃jˈfikɐ ˈβe]), commonly known as Benfica B, is a Portuguese professional football team based in Seixal. Founded in 1999, dissolved in 2006, and restarted in 2012, it is the reserve team of Portuguese club S.L. Benfica. They play in the Liga Portugal 2, holding home matches at Benfica Campus' main pitch.

During the 2012–13 season, Benfica B played home matches at the Estádio da Luz until February, when they moved to Estádio da Tapadinha to prevent excessive wear of the stadium's grass. In 2013–14, they permanently moved to their own training ground, capable of receiving professional league matches.

As a reserve team, Benfica B cannot play in the same division as the club's main team, thus being ineligible for promotion to the Primeira Liga. Moreover, they cannot enter domestic cup competitions such as the Taça de Portugal and Taça da Liga.

Since 2018–19, Benfica have an under-23 team playing in Liga Revelação, a competition for players who left the under-19s but who are not ready to join or regularly play for the first-team.

== History ==
As Benfica sought a way to provide playing time for their youth and reserve players, they created a B team in 1999. The team officially started competing in the 1999–2000 season, with their first match played away against Portimonense S.C. (2–2) in late August. After three seasons in the Portuguese Second Division, they suffered relegation to the Terceira Divisão, where they would spend three years, before achieving promotion to the Portuguese Second Division in 2005. In May of the following year, the board of directors extinguished the side, which returned to activity shortly after as part of the Liga Intercalar. As part of this competition, the team's best league finish was a second place, behind Estoril B, in the South Zone of the 2010–11 season.

Before the end of the 2011–12 football season in Portugal, seven Primeira Liga clubs announced their interest in creating a reserve team to fill the six vacancies available in the Segunda Liga (now Liga Portugal 2) for the 2012–13 campaign. Of those seven clubs, six were selected to take part in the competition: Benfica, Braga, Marítimo, Porto, Sporting CP and Vitória de Guimarães.

LPFP, who organize the professional football tiers in Portugal, announced that the clubs would have to pay €50,000 to register themselves at the league in order to compete in the upcoming season. In addition, LPFP also required them to follow new rules regarding player selection, in which each B team must have a squad with a minimum of ten players formed at the club's academy and with an age between 15 and 21 years, and a maximum of three players above 23 years old. LPFP also decided that reserve teams are unable to compete in cup competitions and to gain promotion to the Primeira Liga due to the possibility of playing against their club's first team.

In late May 2012, it was officially announced that the B teams of six Primeira Liga clubs would compete in the 2012–13 Segunda Liga, a decision that increased the number of teams from 16 to 22 and the number of matches from 30 to 42.

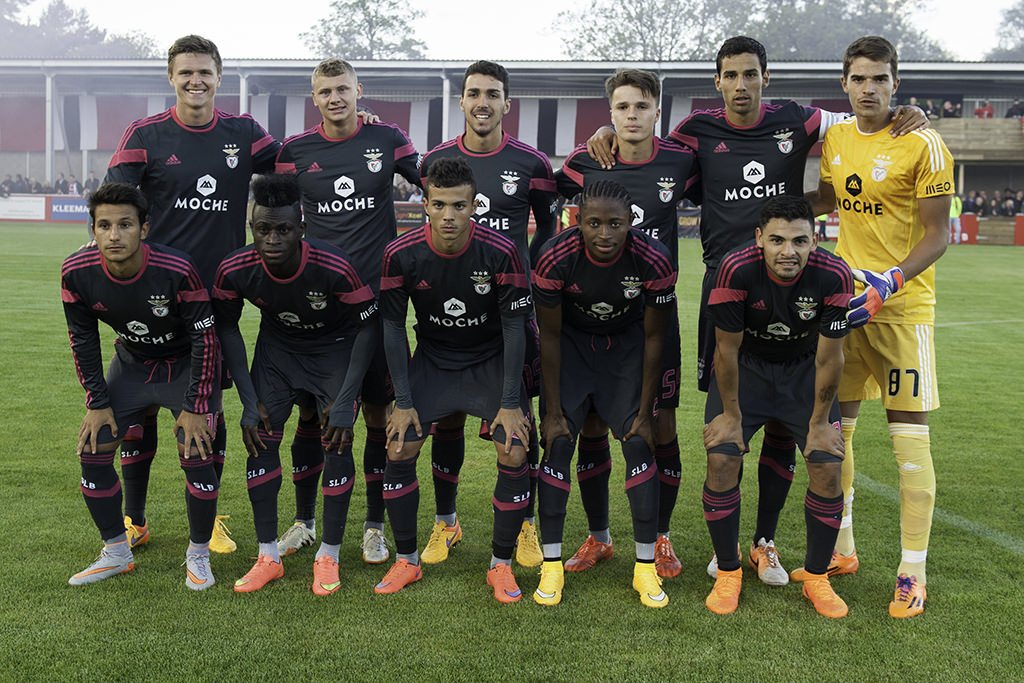
Starting line-up of Benfica B for a friendly match against F.C. United of Manchester in May 2015

In 2014, Benfica B were invited to play in the first Premier League International Cup. On 29 May 2015, they played a friendly against F.C. United of Manchester in Broadhurst Park's official opening match. On 26 May 2019, they played a practice match against Liverpool in Marbella, Spain, five days before the latter's Champions League final.

== Players ==
=== Current squad ===
As of 4 September 2026

Note: Flags indicate national team as defined under FIFA eligibility rules; some limited exceptions apply. Players may hold more than one non-FIFA nationality.

| No. | Pos. | Nation | Player |
|---|---|---|---|
| 51 | GK | LTU | Arnas Voitinovicius |
| 52 | DF | POR | João Capucho |
| 54 | FW | POR | Francisco Neto |
| 55 | DF | POR | João Fonseca |
| 56 | FW | BRA | Felipe Lima (on loan from Alverca) |
| 60 | MF | POR | Nuno Félix |
| 61 | DF | POR | João Conceição |
| 63 | DF | POR | Guilherme Gaspar |
| 71 | MF | ITA | Federico Coletta |
| 73 | MF | POR | Miguel Figueiredo |
| 74 | FW | POR | Olívio Tomé |
| 75 | DF | POR | Leandro Martins |
| 76 | MF | POR | Rafael Quintas |

| No. | Pos. | Nation | Player |
|---|---|---|---|
| 77 | MF | POR | Gonçalo Moreira |
| 78 | DF | POR | Duarte Soares |
| 79 | FW | POR | Tomás Soares |
| 80 | GK | POR | Gonçalo Sobral |
| 81 | MF | POR | Stevan Manuel |
| 85 | DF | POR | Martim Ferreira |
| 87 | FW | NGR | Peter Edokpolor |
| 88 | MF | POR | Tiago Freitas |
| 90 | GK | POR | Leonardo Lopes |
| 91 | FW | POR | Francisco Silva |
| 94 | DF | POR | Rui Silva |
| 96 | FW | BEL | Jelani Trevisan |
| 99 | FW | POR | Eduardo Fernandes |

=== Out on loan ===
Note: Flags indicate national team as defined under FIFA eligibility rules; some limited exceptions apply. Players may hold more than one non-FIFA nationality.

| No. | Pos. | Nation | Player |
|---|---|---|---|
| 89 | DF | POR | Tiago Parente (at Swansea City until 30 June 2027) |

== Coaching staff ==
| Position | Name |
|---|---|
| Head coach | Nélson Veríssimo |
| Assistant coaches | Marco Pimenta; Jorge Cordeiro |
| Goalkeeper coach | Paulo Marques |
| Analyst coach | Pedro Pitacas |
| Analyst assistant coach | Rúben Damazio |
| Personal trainers (Benfica LAB) | Tiago Vaz; Duarte Carvalho |

Last updated: 6 July 2023

== Records and statistics ==
=== Season-to-season record ===
| Season | Div | Pos | Pld | W | D | L | GF | GA | Pts | Top scorer | Goals | Refs |
|---|---|---|---|---|---|---|---|---|---|---|---|---|
| 1999–2000 | III | 13th | 38 | 14 | 6 | 18 | 53 | 49 | 48 | (Portugal) Cláudio Oeiras | 11 | |
| 2000–2001 | III | 9th | 38 | 14 | 11 | 13 | 58 | 57 | 57 | (Portugal) Jorge Cordeiro | 16 | |
| 2001–2002 | III | 18th | 38 | 11 | 11 | 16 | 35 | 42 | 44 | (Portugal) Jorge Ribeiro | 5 | |
| 2002–2003 | IV | 3rd | 34 | 14 | 14 | 6 | 47 | 25 | 56 | | | |
| 2003–2004 | IV | 5th | 34 | 15 | 8 | 11 | 63 | 48 | 53 | | | |
| 2004–2005 | IV | 1st | 34 | 21 | 9 | 4 | 71 | 29 | 72 | | | |
| 2005–2006 | III | 11th | 30 | 11 | 8 | 11 | 40 | 40 | 41 | (Portugal) Vasco Firmino | 5 | |
| 2012–2013 | II | 7th | 42 | 15 | 17 | 10 | 71 | 54 | 62 | (Portugal) Miguel Rosa | 17 | |
| 2013–2014 | II | 5th | 42 | 20 | 10 | 12 | 77 | 56 | 70 | (Argentina) Funes Mori | 13 | |
| 2014–2015 | II | 6th | 46 | 22 | 11 | 13 | 81 | 60 | 77 | (Portugal) Rui Fonte | 17 | |
| 2015–2016 | II | 19th | 46 | 15 | 10 | 21 | 59 | 64 | 55 | (Portugal) Sancidino Silva | 6 | |
| 2016–2017 | II | 4th | 42 | 18 | 9 | 15 | 56 | 58 | 63 | (Portugal) Heriberto Tavares | 11 | |
| 2017–2018 | II | 13th | 38 | 14 | 7 | 17 | 54 | 60 | 49 | (Portugal) Heriberto Tavares | 14 | |
| 2018–2019 | II | 4th | 34 | 15 | 7 | 12 | 47 | 42 | 52 | (England) Chris Willock | 11 | |
| 2019–2020 | II | 14th | 24 | 7 | 7 | 10 | 31 | 35 | 28 | (Brazil) Daniel dos Anjos | 8 | |
| 2020–2021 | II | 8th | 34 | 12 | 8 | 14 | 53 | 43 | 44 | (Portugal) Gonçalo Ramos (Portugal) Henrique Araújo | 11 | |
| 2021–2022 | II | 5th | 34 | 17 | 6 | 11 | 61 | 44 | 57 | (Portugal) Henrique Araújo | 14 | |
| 2022–2023 | II | 15th | 34 | 10 | 8 | 16 | 52 | 58 | 38 | (Portugal) Henrique Pereira | 9 | |
| 2023–2024 | II | 8th | 34 | 12 | 9 | 13 | 48 | 48 | 45 | (Brazil) Cauê | 7 | |
| 2024–2025 | II | 4th | 34 | 15 | 10 | 9 | 53 | 38 | 55 | (Portugal) Gustavo Varela | 11 | |

| Champions | Relegated |

=== Managerial statistics ===
As of match played 27 May 2025. Only competitive matches are counted, including those in the Premier League International Cup.

| Name | Nat | From | To | P | W | D | L | GF | GA | Win % | Honours | Refs |
|---|---|---|---|---|---|---|---|---|---|---|---|---|
| Alan Murray | (England) | 1999 | November 1999 | 9 | 4 | 0 | 5 | 13 | 12 | 44.44 | | |
| José Morais | (Portugal) | November 1999 | 2001 | 67 | 24 | 17 | 26 | 98 | 94 | 35.82 | | |
| António Veloso | (Portugal) | 9 June 2001 | 2002 | 38 | 11 | 11 | 16 | 35 | 42 | 28.95 | | |
| Carlos Gomes | (Portugal) | 2002 | July 2004 | 68 | 28 | 24 | 16 | 107 | 72 | 41.18 | | |
| João Santos | (Portugal) | 2004 | 2006 | 64 | 32 | 17 | 15 | 111 | 69 | 50.00 | 2004–05 Terceira Divisão | |
| Luís Norton de Matos | (Portugal) | 4 May 2012 | 30 May 2013 | 42 | 15 | 17 | 10 | 71 | 54 | 35.71 | | |
| Hélder Cristóvão | (Portugal) | 3 July 2013 | 12 May 2018 | 224 | 93 | 49 | 82 | 340 | 309 | 41.52 | | |
| Bruno Lage | (Portugal) | 1 July 2018 | 3 January 2019 | 15 | 8 | 3 | 4 | 15 | 11 | 53.33 | | |
| Nélson Veríssimo (caretaker) | (Portugal) | 3 January 2019 | 15 January 2019 | 3 | 0 | 1 | 2 | 5 | 7 | 0.00 | | |
| Renato Paiva | (Portugal) | 15 January 2019 | 25 December 2020 | 58 | 21 | 12 | 25 | 84 | 85 | 36.21 | | |
| Nélson Veríssimo | (Portugal) | 25 December 2020 | 28 December 2021 | 36 | 18 | 10 | 8 | 64 | 38 | 50.00 | | |
| Paulo Mateus (caretaker) | (Portugal) | 28 December 2021 | 28 December 2021 | 1 | 0 | 0 | 1 | 1 | 2 | 0.00 | | |
| António Oliveira | (Portugal) | 5 January 2022 | 13 May 2022 | 18 | 7 | 3 | 8 | 37 | 57 | 38.89 | | |
| Luís Castro | (Portugal) | 2 June 2022 | 8 June 2023 | 34 | 10 | 8 | 16 | 52 | 58 | 29.41 | | |
| Nélson Veríssimo | (Portugal) | 6 July 2023 | Present | 76 | 28 | 22 | 26 | 110 | 99 | 36.84 | | |

=== Competitive record in U21 Premier League International Cup ===
As of December 2025.

| Season | Round | Opponent | Match Result |
|---|---|---|---|
| 2014–15 Premier League International Cup | GS | (Germany) Schalke 04 | 1–0 |
| 2014–15 Premier League International Cup | GS | (England) Manchester City | 1–3 |
| 2014–15 Premier League International Cup | GS | (England) Leicester City | 0–2 |
| 2015–16 Premier League International Cup | GS | (Scotland) Celtic | 2–1 |
| 2015–16 Premier League International Cup | GS | (England) Chelsea | 3–0 |
| 2015–16 Premier League International Cup | GS | (England) Liverpool FC | 2–0 |
| 2015–16 Premier League International Cup | QF | (Portugal) Porto | 0–1 |
| 2016–17 Premier League International Cup | GS | (England) Derby County | 2–0 |
| 2016–17 Premier League International Cup | GS | (England) Sunderland | 1–2 |
| 2016–17 Premier League International Cup | GS | (Netherlands) PSV Eindhoven | 0–0 |
| 2017–18 Premier League International Cup | GS | (Spain) Villarreal CF | 2–3 |
| 2017–18 Premier League International Cup | GS | (England) West Ham United | 2–0 |
| 2017–18 Premier League International Cup | GS | (England) Tottenham Hotspur | 3–3 |
| 2018–19 Premier League International Cup | GS | (England) Everton FC | 0–2 |
| 2018–19 Premier League International Cup | GS | (England) Brighton & Hove Albion | 0–2 |
| 2018–19 Premier League International Cup | GS | (Germany) FC Bayern Munich | 1–0 |
| 2019–20 Premier League International Cup | GS | (Germany) Hertha BSC | 2–1 |
| 2019–20 Premier League International Cup | GS | (England) Newcastle United | 1–1 |
| 2019–20 Premier League International Cup | GS | (England) Blackburn Rovers | 2–1 |
| 2019–20 Premier League International Cup | QF | (Wales) Swansea City | Suspended due to COVID-19 |
| 2023–24 Premier League International Cup | GS | (England) Liverpool FC | 1–1 |
| 2023–24 Premier League International Cup | GS | (England) Crystal Palace | 1–2 |
| 2023–24 Premier League International Cup | GS | (England) Fulham FC | 1–3 |
| 2023–24 Premier League International Cup | GS | (England) Everton FC | 1–2 |
| 2024–25 Premier League International Cup | GS | (England) West Ham United | 2–2 |
| 2024–25 Premier League International Cup | GS | (England) Blackburn Rovers | 1–1 |
| 2024–25 Premier League International Cup | GS | (England) Middlesbrough FC | 1–0 |
| 2024–25 Premier League International Cup | GS | (England) Sunderland | 1–2 |
| 2025–26 Premier League International Cup | GS | (England) Brighton & Hove Albion | 1–1 |
| 2025–26 Premier League International Cup | GS | (England) Nottingham Forest | 1–1 |
| 2025–26 Premier League International Cup | GS | (England) Chelsea | 6–2 |
| 2025–26 Premier League International Cup | GS | (England) Newcastle United | 5–0 |

== Honours ==
- Terceira Divisão
  - Winners (1): 2004–05

== Under-23s ==
=== Current squad ===
Note: Flags indicate national team as defined under FIFA eligibility rules; some limited exceptions apply. Players may hold more than one non-FIFA nationality.

| No. | Pos. | Nation | Player |
|---|---|---|---|
| — | GK | SRB | Luka Velickovic |
| — | GK | POR | Gonçalo Sobral |
| — | GK | POR | João Fidalgo |
| — | DF | POR | João Conceição |
| — | DF | POR | Vladimir Mendes |
| — | DF | POR | Duarte Soares |
| — | DF | POR | Guilherme Gaspar |
| — | DF | POR | Diogo Rocha |
| — | DF | POR | Mauro Furtado |
| — | DF | POR | João Capucho |
| — | DF | POL | Leon Zietek |

| No. | Pos. | Nation | Player |
|---|---|---|---|
| — | MF | POR | Rafael Quintas |
| — | MF | POR | Stevan Manuel |
| — | MF | POR | Gil Neves |
| — | MF | POR | André Gomes |
| — | FW | IRL | Jaden Umeh |
| — | FW | POR | Juvenal Correia |
| — | FW | POR | João Afonso |
| — | FW | POR | Gustavo Ferreira |
| — | FW | POR | Tomás Soares |
| — | FW | POR | Jair Monteiro |

=== Coaching staff ===
| Position | Name |
|---|---|
| Head coach | Paulo Lopes |
| Assistant coaches | Pedro Valido; Paulo Mateus |
| Goalkeeper coach | Gonçalo Reduto |
| Analyst coach | Rodolfo Fernandes |
| Analyst assistant coach | José Marques |
| Personal trainers (Benfica LAB) | Luke Garcia |

Last updated: 6 July 2023

=== Honours ===
- Taça Revelação
  - Winners (1): 2024–25
