= Duarte Cunha =

Portuguese footballer (born 2008)

Personal information
- Full name: Duarte Lopes Cunha
- Date of birth: 25 January 2008 (age 18)
- Place of birth: Vila Nova de Cerveira, Portugal
- Height: 1.76 m (5 ft 9 in)
- Position: Winger

Team information
- Current team: Porto B
- Number: 57

Youth career
- 2017–: Porto

Senior career*
Years	Team	Apps	(Gls)
2026–	Porto B	12	(2)

International career^{‡}
2023–2024	Portugal U16	9	(0)
2024–2025	Portugal U17	18	(1)
Medal record
Men's football
Representing Portugal
FIFA U-17 World Cup
Winner	2025 Qatar
UEFA European Under-17 Championship
Winner	2025 Albania
- * Club domestic league appearances and goals ‡ National team caps and goals as of 2 June 2025

Duarte Lopes Cunha (born 25 January 2008) is a Portuguese footballer who plays as a winger for Porto B.

== Club career ==
Born in Vila Nova de Cerveira, Cunha was trained by FC Porto, which he joined at the age of 9. He first distinguished himself in the youth teams with the Portuguese football club, before signing his first professional contract there in December 2024.

== International career ==
Cunha was named in Portugal U17's squad for the 2025 UEFA European Under-17 Championship. Portugal reached the final of the competition after winning on penalties against Italy (after a 2–2 draw). While it was Romário Cunha (no relation) who took the spotlight during the penalty shootout with his saves, Duarte Cunha is also mentioned as the best player of this semi-final, notably the decisive pass for Stevan's goal to make it 1-1. The team then claimed the trophy by defeating France 3–0 in the final, with Cunha once again in the foreground, scoring his side's second goal.

== Honours ==
Portugal U17

- FIFA U-17 World Cup: 2025
- UEFA European Under-17 Championship: 2025

Individual

- UEFA European Under-17 Championship Team of the Tournament: 2025
