= Federico Steffanoni =

Italian footballer (born 2008)

Personal information
- Full name: Federico Alessandro Steffanoni
- Date of birth: 4 September 2008 (age 18)
- Place of birth: Treviglio, Italy
- Height: 1.88 m (6 ft 2 in)
- Position: Midfielder

Team information
- Current team: Atalanta U23
- Number: 25

Youth career
- La Bussola
- Vidalengo
- 2014–2025: Atalanta

Senior career*
Years	Team	Apps	(Gls)
2024–	Atalanta	0	(0)
2025–	Atalanta U23	38	(2)

International career^{‡}
2024–2025	Italy U17	25	(0)
2025	Italy U18	3	(0)
2026–	Italy U19	6	(0)
- * Club domestic league appearances and goals as of 7 November 2026 ‡ National team caps and goals as of 11 November 2026

Federico Alessandro Steffanoni (born 4 September 2008) is an Italian professional footballer who plays as a midfielder for Atalanta U23.

== Club career ==
=== Atalanta ===
Born in Treviglio, Province of Bergamo, Steffanoni first played for local clubs Bussola and Vidalengo, before joining the Atalanta's academy in 2014, and won the under-16 national championship with the club's under-16 side in 2024.

In the 2024–25 season he played regularly for the under-20 side in the Campionato Primavera and the UEFA Youth League, although he was still of under-17 age. He was named the revelation of the Campionato Primavera at the end of the season.

In October 2024, he signed his first professional contract with Atalanta.

That same month he first featured on the team sheet with the first team under Gian Piero Gasperini, during a Serie A game against Venezia.

He started playing for the reserve team in Serie C during the 2025–26 season.

Steffanoni made his professional debut with Atalanta U23 on 4 October 2025, coming on as a late substitute for Alberto Manzoni in a 1–1 home Serie C draw to Foggia. Only a few days later, he made his first start in a 2–1 away Serie C win over Cosenza, later becoming one of the team focal points during that season.

== International career ==
Steffanoni is a youth international for Italy, having played for the under-17, under-18 and under-19.

With the under-17, he was part of the team that reached the semi-finals in both the 2025 Euro and World cup, along the likes of Samuele Inácio, Luca Reggiani and Christian Comotto.

== Honours ==
Atalanta

- Campionato Nazionale Under-16: 2023–24

Italy U17

- FIFA U-17 World Cup third place: 2025
