= Lionel Rouxel =

French footballer (born 1970)

Personal information
- Date of birth: 16 August 1970 (age 56)
- Place of birth: France
- Position: Striker

Team information
- Current team: France U17 (manager)

Senior career*
Years	Team	Apps	(Gls)
1989–1998	Guingamp	225	(68)
1998–2000	Strasbourg	36	(6)
2000–2002	Laval	65	(16)
2002–2003	Paris FC	16	(1)

International career
1998–2001	Brittany	2	(1)
Medal record
Men's football
Representing France (as manager)
UEFA European Under-17 Championship
Runner-up	2025 Albania
- * Club domestic league appearances and goals

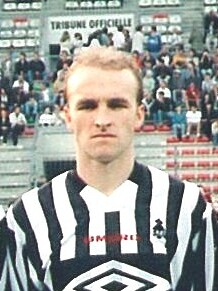

Lionel Rouxel (born 16 August 1970) is a French professional football manager and former player who currently manages the France national under-17 football team.

== Early life ==
Rouxel started his career with French side Guingamp. He was first called up to the senior team at the age of sixteen.

== Education ==
Rouxel attended Notre Dame School in France. He obtained a Brevet de technicien supérieur.

== Career ==
In 1998, Rouxel signed for French side Strasbourg. In 2000, he signed for French side Laval. In 2002, he signed for French side Paris FC.

== Personal life ==
Rouxel was born in 1970 in France. He is a native of Dinan, France.

== Honours ==
=== Managerial ===
France U17

- UEFA European Under-17 Championship runner-up: 2025
