= Hermann Malonga =

French footballer (born 2008)

Personal information
- Full name: Hermann Benny Diandaga Malonga
- Date of birth: 8 January 2008 (age 18)
- Place of birth: Étampes, France
- Height: 1.89 m (6 ft 2 in)
- Position: Defender

Team information
- Current team: Strasbourg
- Number: 36

Youth career
- –2016: FC Melun
- 2017–2018: AS Lieusaint Football
- 2018–2021: US Sénart-Moissy
- 2021–2026: Paris Saint-Germain FC

Senior career*
Years	Team	Apps	(Gls)
2026–	Strasbourg	0	(0)

International career^{‡}
2023–2024	France U16	11	(0)
2024–2025	France U17	8	(1)
- * Club domestic league appearances and goals ‡ National team caps and goals as of 1 June 2025

Hermann Benny Diandaga Malonga (born 8 January 2008) is a French professional footballer who plays as a defender for Ligue 1 side Strasbourg.

== Club career ==
As a youth player, Mbemba joined the youth academy of French side FC Melun. Following his stint there, he joined the youth academy of French side AS Lieusaint Football in 2017, before joining the youth academy of French side US Sénart-Moissy in 2018.

Ahead of the 2021–22 season, he joined the youth academy of French Ligue 1 side Paris Saint-Germain FC, where he played in the UEFA Youth League.

== International career ==
Born in France, Malonga holds French and Congolese nationalities. He is a France youth international. During May and June 2025, he played for the France national under-17 football team at the 2025 UEFA European Under-17 Championship.

== Style of play ==
Malonga plays as a defender. French newspaper L'Équipe wrote in 2026 "solid, powerful, and possessing reliable distribution, the... player has a well-rounded skill set".
