= Seth Ridgeon =

English footballer (born 2008)

Personal information
- Full name: Seth Somapalan Ridgeon
- Date of birth: 12 September 2008 (age 18)
- Place of birth: England
- Height: 5 ft 7 in (1.71 m)
- Position: Midfielder

Team information
- Current team: Fulham

Youth career
- 2017–: Fulham

Senior career*
Years	Team	Apps	(Gls)
2025–	Fulham	0	(0)

International career^{‡}
2023–2024	England U16	7	(2)
2024–2025	England U17	15	(1)
2025–	England U18	4	(0)
- * Club domestic league appearances and goals ‡ National team caps and goals as of 18 November 2025

Seth Somapalan Ridgeon (born 12 September 2008) is an English professional footballer who plays as a midfielder for Fulham.

== Early life ==
Ridgeon was born on 12 September 2008. Born in England, he is of Tamil Sri Lankan descent through his mother. His father is former athlete Jon Ridgeon.

== Club career ==
Ridgeon joined the youth system of Fulham at the age of eight. In 2025, he was promoted to the club's senior team. He was an unused substitute during the 2025–26 EFL Cup quarter-final defeat against Newcastle United.

== International career ==
Ridgeon is an England youth international. During May 2025, he captained England U17 at the 2025 UEFA European Under-17 Championship. Later that year he also led England at the 2025 FIFA U-17 World Cup starting all five of their games at the tournament including the round of sixteen defeat against Austria.

== Style of play ==
Ridgeon plays as a midfielder. English news website Total Football Analysis wrote in 2025 that his "data portrays him as a technically gifted, intelligent, all-around midfielder whose strengths lie in his ability to consistently make the right decisions, his rich passing range, and his capacity to glide through pressure with ease".
