= Abdoulaye Camara (footballer, born 2008) =

French professional footballer (born 2008)

Personal information
- Date of birth: 28 September 2008 (age 18)
- Place of birth: Conakry, Guinea
- Height: 1.88 m (6 ft 2 in)
- Position: Defensive midfielder

Team information
- Current team: Jong Ajax (on loan from Udinese)
- Number: 46

Youth career
- 2018–2023: Air Bel
- 2023–2025: Montpellier

Senior career*
Years	Team	Apps	(Gls)
2025–	Udinese	1	(0)
2026–	→ Jong Ajax (loan)	2	(0)

International career^{‡}
2023–2024	France U16	10	(0)
2024–2025	France U17	19	(1)
2025–2026	France U18	13	(0)
2026–	France U19	3	(0)
- * Club domestic league appearances and goals as of 9 October 2026 ‡ National team caps and goals as of 23 August 2026

Abdoulaye Camara (born 28 September 2008) is a French professional footballer who plays as a defensive midfielder for Eerste Divisie club Jong Ajax, on loan from Serie A club Udinese. Born in Guinea, he represents France at youth international level.

== Early life ==
Camara was born in Conakry, Guinea, before moving to France at a young age. He began his youth football development in Marseille with Air Bel in 2018, spending five years at the grassroots club.

== Club career ==
=== Montpellier ===
In July 2023, Camara joined the youth academy of Ligue 1 side Montpellier. During the 2024–25 season, he progressed to the club's reserve side in the Championnat National 3 and earned call-ups to train with the senior squad, featuring on the bench in a Ligue 1 fixture against Nice.

=== Udinese ===
In July 2025, Camara moved to Italian club Udinese, signing a contract running until June 2029. He spent the majority of the 2025–26 season playing for and captaining Udinese's under-19 Primavera side, while regularly training with the first-team squad.

On 17 May 2026, Camara made his professional and Serie A debut for Udinese, coming on as a late substitute in a 1–0 home defeat against Cremonese.

=== Ajax ===
On 22 August 2026, Dutch club Ajax announced that they had reached an agreement with Udinese to sign Camara on a season-long loan with an option to purchase. Upon completion of the move, Camara was assigned to the Jong Ajax squad based at the Sportpark De Toekomst training complex to continue his post-academy development.

== International career ==
Eligible to represent Guinea and France, Camara opted to represent France internationally. He received his first call-up to the France under-16 team in 2023, earning ten caps.

In 2024, he progressed to the France under-17 team, where he was appointed team captain. He captained the side at the 2025 UEFA European Under-17 Championship, leading France to the final, and was subsequently selected for the squad at the 2025 FIFA U-17 World Cup.

Camara continued to represent France at the under-18 and under-19 levels, captaining the France under-19 team in 2026.

== Style of play ==
Primarily functioning as a defensive midfielder (number 6), Camara is noted for his physical presence, tackling range, and anticipation in intercepting loose balls. In possession, he is recognized for his press resistance, composure in tight spaces, and vertical line-breaking passing range into forward channels.

== Career statistics ==
=== Club ===
As of match played 17 May 2026

Club	Season	League			National cup (Note: Includes Coppa Italia, KNVB Cup)		Continental		Total	
Club	Season	Division	Apps	Goals	Apps	Goals	Apps	Goals	Apps	Goals
Udinese	2025–26	Serie A	1	0	0	0	—	—	1	0
Jong Ajax (loan)	2026–27	Eerste Divisie	0	0	—		—		0	0
Ajax (loan)	2026–27	Eredivisie	0	0	0	0	0	0	0	0
Career total			1	0	0	0	0	0	1	0

== Honours ==
France U17

- UEFA European Under-17 Championship runner-up: 2025
