= Daniel Banjaqui =

Portuguese footballer (born 2008)

Personal information
- Full name: Daniel Armando Fonseca da Silva Banjaqui
- Date of birth: 24 March 2008 (age 18)
- Place of birth: Lisbon, Portugal
- Height: 1.84 m (6 ft 0 in)
- Position: Right-back

Team information
- Current team: Benfica B
- Number: 58

Youth career
- –2018: Real
- 2018–2025: Benfica

Senior career*
Years	Team	Apps	(Gls)
2025–	Benfica B	19	(0)
2025–	Benfica	2	(0)

International career^{‡}
2023	Portugal U15	3	(0)
2023–2024	Portugal U16	9	(1)
2024–	Portugal U17	16	(1)
2025–	Portugal U18	5	(0)
Medal record
Men's football
Representing Portugal
FIFA U-17 World Cup
Winner	2025 Qatar
UEFA European Under-17 Championship
Winner	2025 Albania
- * Club domestic league appearances and goals as of 20 June 2026 ‡ National team caps and goals as of 14 October 2025

Daniel Armando Fonseca da Silva Banjaqui (born 24 March 2008) is a Portuguese professional footballer who plays as a right-back for Benfica B.

== Early life ==
Banjaqui was born on 24 March 2008. Born in Lisbon, Portugal, he is the younger brother of Guinea-Bissau international Zidane Banjaqui and Portuguese footballer Figo Banjaqui.

== Club career ==
As a youth player, Banjaqui joined the youth academy of Real. Following his stint there, he joined the youth academy of Benfica in 2018.

On 17 December 2025, Banjaqui made his debut for Benfica's senior team, coming on as a substitute for the final minutes of a 2–0 victory over Farense in the Taça de Portugal. On 25 January 2026, he made his Primeira Liga debut, starting in a 4–0 victory over Estrela da Amadora, where he assisted fellow debutant Anísio Cabral for the final goal of the match.

== International career ==
At youth international level, Banjaqui represented Portugal at the 2025 UEFA European Under-17 Championship, starting in the final as Portugal defeated France 3–0 on 1 June. He subsequently appeared in all seven of Portugal's matches at the 2025 FIFA U-17 World Cup in Qatar, starting in the final against Austria, which Portugal won 1–0 on 27 November.

== Style of play ==
Banjaqui plays as a defender. English newspaper The Guardian wrote in 2025 that he is "a true locomotive... a fast and powerful full-back".

== Career statistics ==
As of match played 1 February 2026

Appearances and goals by club, season and competition
Club	Season	League			National cup		League cup		Continental		Other		Total	
Club	Season	Division	Apps	Goals	Apps	Goals	Apps	Goals	Apps	Goals	Apps	Goals	Apps	Goals
Benfica B	2025–26	Liga Portugal 2	8	0	—		—		—		—		8	0
Benfica	2025–26	Primeira Liga	2	0	1	0	0	0	0	0	0	0	3	0
Career total			10	0	1	0	0	0	0	0	0	0	11	0

== Honours ==
Portugal U17

- FIFA U-17 World Cup: 2025
- UEFA European Under-17 Championship: 2025

Individual

- UEFA European Under-17 Championship Team of the Tournament: 2025
