= Malachi Hardy =

English footballer (born 2008)

Personal information
- Full name: Malachi John Hardy
- Date of birth: 10 March 2008 (age 18)
- Place of birth: Watford, England
- Height: 1.88 m (6 ft 2 in)
- Position: Defender

Team information
- Current team: Tottenham Hotspur
- Number: 66

Youth career
- 2016–: Tottenham Hotspur

International career^{‡}
Years	Team	Apps	(Gls)
2023	England U15	1	(0)
2023–2024	England U16	8	(1)
2024–2025	England U17	14	(1)
2025–	England U18	6	(0)
- ‡ National team caps and goals as of 14:21, 3 June 2026 (UTC)

Malachi John Hardy (born 10 March 2008) is an English professional footballer who plays as a defender for Tottenham Hotspur's academy.

== Club career ==
Hardy joined the youth academy of Premier League side Tottenham Hotspur at the age of eight. In 2024, he was promoted to the club's under-18 team and started training with the first team. He signed his first professional contract with Tottenham Hotspur on 20 March 2025.

== International career ==
Hardy is an England youth international. At the age of sixteen, he captained England Under-17. He was included in the squad for the 2025 UEFA European Under-17 Championship and started group stage games against Italy and Czech Republic.

On 3 September 2025, Hardy made his England U18 debut during a 3-1 win over Uzbekistan.

On 30 October 2025, Hardy was a late addition to England's squad for the 2025 FIFA U-17 World Cup. He started their opening game of the tournament against Venezuela.

== Style of play ==
Hardy plays as a defender and is right-footed. English newspaper Evening Standard wrote in 2024 that he "has the makings of a commanding centre-back... has won plaudits at youth level for his maturity and calmness both in and out of possession".
