= Dijar Ferati =

Association football player (born 2008)

Personal information
- Date of birth: 24 September 2008 (age 18)
- Place of birth: Gothenburg, Sweden
- Position: Central midfielder

Team information
- Current team: Rio Ave
- Number: 75

Youth career
- –2023: IFK Göteborg
- 2024: Utsiktens BK
- 2025–: Rio Ave

Senior career*
Years	Team	Apps	(Gls)
2024	Utsiktens BK	7	(0)
2025–	Rio Ave	0	(0)

International career
2024–	Albania U17	4	(0)
- * Club domestic league appearances and goals as of 26 May 2026

Dijar Ferati (born 24 September 2008) is a professional footballer who plays as a central midfielder for Rio Ave. Born in Sweden, he plays for the Albania national under-17 team.

== Club career ==
Ferati was a member of the IFK Göteborg academy prior to joining Superettan side Utsiktens BK in April 2024.

On 27 April 2024, at the age of 15 years and seven months, he made his league debut for Utsiktens against Landskrona BoIS. In doing so, Ferati became the first male footballer born in 2008 to play a league match in one of the country's highest two divisions.

On 7 January 2025, Fabrizio Romano confirmed a transfer of the 16-years-old to Portugal signing with Rio Ave.

== International career ==
He switched for Albania internationally debuting for the Under-17 side during the end of the 2024s year. He was invited in May 2025 to be part of the 2025 UEFA European Under-17 Championship squad in home soil.

== Personal life ==
Ferati was born in Gothenburg, Sweden to ethnic Albanian parents from Mitrovica.
