= Jeremiah Mensah =

German footballer (born 2008)

Personal information
- Full name: Jeremiah Dennit Mensah
- Date of birth: 21 February 2008 (age 18)
- Place of birth: Germany
- Height: 1.77 m (5 ft 10 in)
- Positions: Attacking midfielder; forward

Team information
- Current team: Roda JC (on loan from Bayer Leverkusen)
- Number: 8

Youth career
- 2014–: Bayer Leverkusen

Senior career*
Years	Team	Apps	(Gls)
2025–	Bayer Leverkusen	0	(0)
2026–	→ Roda JC (loan)	11	(0)

International career^{‡}
2023	Germany U15	2	(1)
2023–2024	Germany U16	8	(0)
2024–2025	Germany U17	16	(4)
2026–	Germany U19	6	(0)
- * Club domestic league appearances and goals as of 23:45, 6 November 2026 (UTC) ‡ National team caps and goals as of 23:45, 3 October 2026 (UTC)

Jeremiah Dennit Mensah (born 21 February 2008) is a German professional footballer who plays as an attacking midfielder and forward for Eerste Divisie club Roda JC on loan from Bayer Leverkusen.

== Club career ==
=== Bayer Leverkusen ===
Mensah is a product of youth academy of Bayer Leverkusen since 2014 when he was 6 years old, and was promoted to their U19s in 2024. On 24 July 2024, he extended his contract with Bayer Leverkusen. Mensah made his senior and professional debut with Bayer Leverkusen in a 4–0 DFB-Pokal win over Sonnenhof Großaspach 15 August 2025. He debuted in the UEFA Champions League with Leverkusen as a substitute in a 7–2 loss to Paris Saint-Germain on 21 October 2025.

==== Loan to Roda JC ====
On 12 August 2026, Mensah joined Dutch Eerste Divisie club Roda JC, on loan.

== International career ==
Born in Germany, Mensah is of Ghanaian and French descent, also holding both Ghanaian and French citizenship from his parents. He was part of the Germany U17 squad for the 2025 UEFA European Under-17 Championship and the 2025 FIFA U-17 World Cup.
