= Nathan De Cat =

Belgian footballer (born 2008)

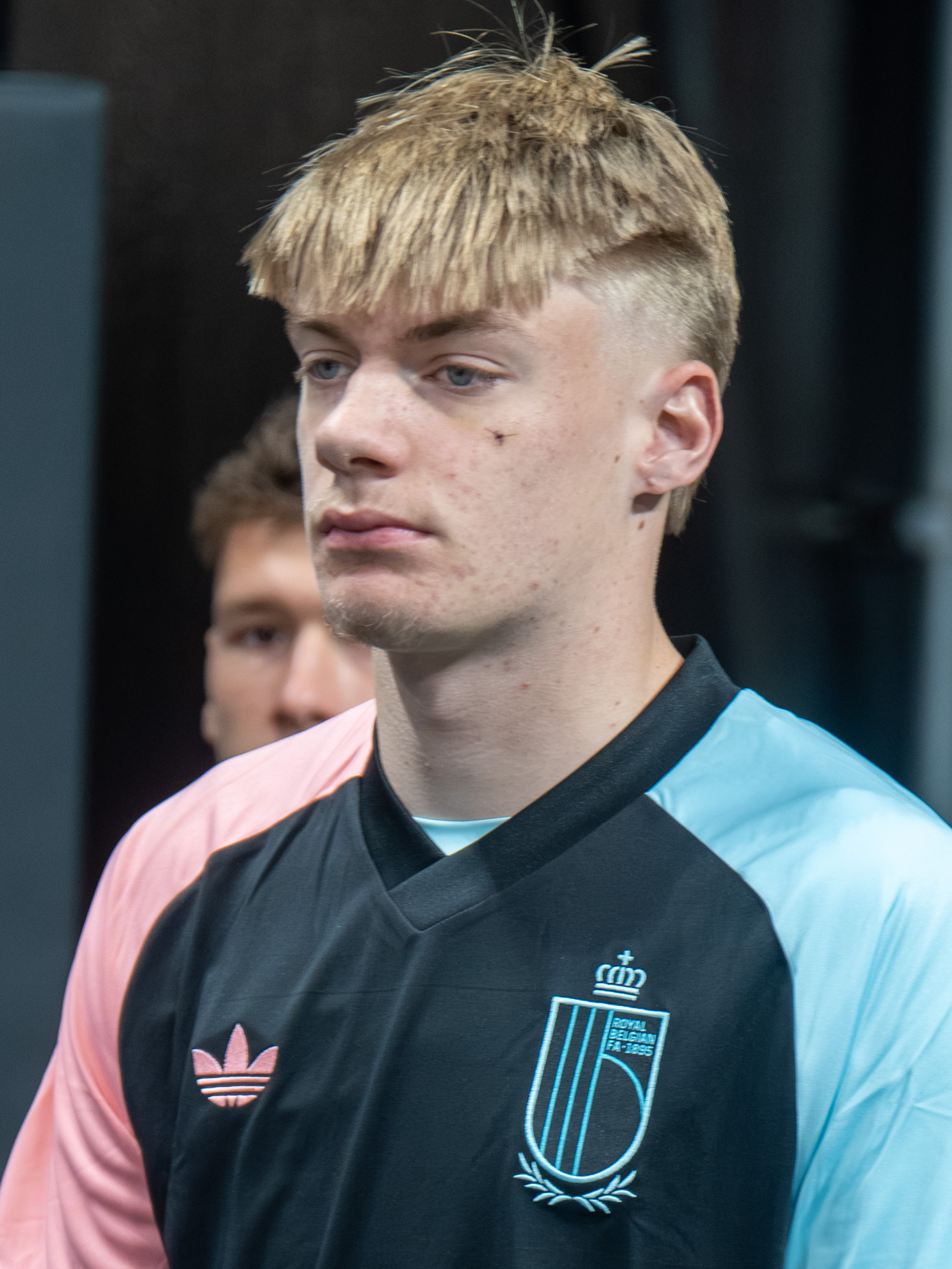
- De Cat with Belgium in 2026

Personal information
- Full name: Nathan De Cat
- Date of birth: 19 July 2008 (age 18)
- Place of birth: Vilvoorde, Belgium
- Height: 1.92 m (6 ft 4 in)
- Position: Midfielder

Team information
- Current team: TSG Hoffenheim
- Number: 17

Youth career
- –2024: Anderlecht

Senior career*
Years	Team	Apps	(Gls)
2024–2025	RSCA Futures	33	(3)
2025–2026	Anderlecht	42	(3)
2026–	TSG Hoffenheim	2	(0)

International career^{‡}
2023	Belgium U15	4	(0)
2024–2025	Belgium U17	10	(2)
2025	Belgium U18	2	(1)
2024–	Belgium U19	4	(0)
2026–	Belgium U21	2	(0)
2026–	Belgium	1	(0)
- * Club domestic league appearances and goals as of 5 September 2026 ‡ National team caps and goals as of 15:47, 18 November 2026 (UTC)

Nathan De Cat (Dutch pronunciation: [ˈnaːtɑn də kɑt]; born 19 July 2008) is a Belgian professional footballer who plays as a defensive midfielder for German Bundesliga club TSG Hoffenheim and the Belgium national team.

== Club career ==
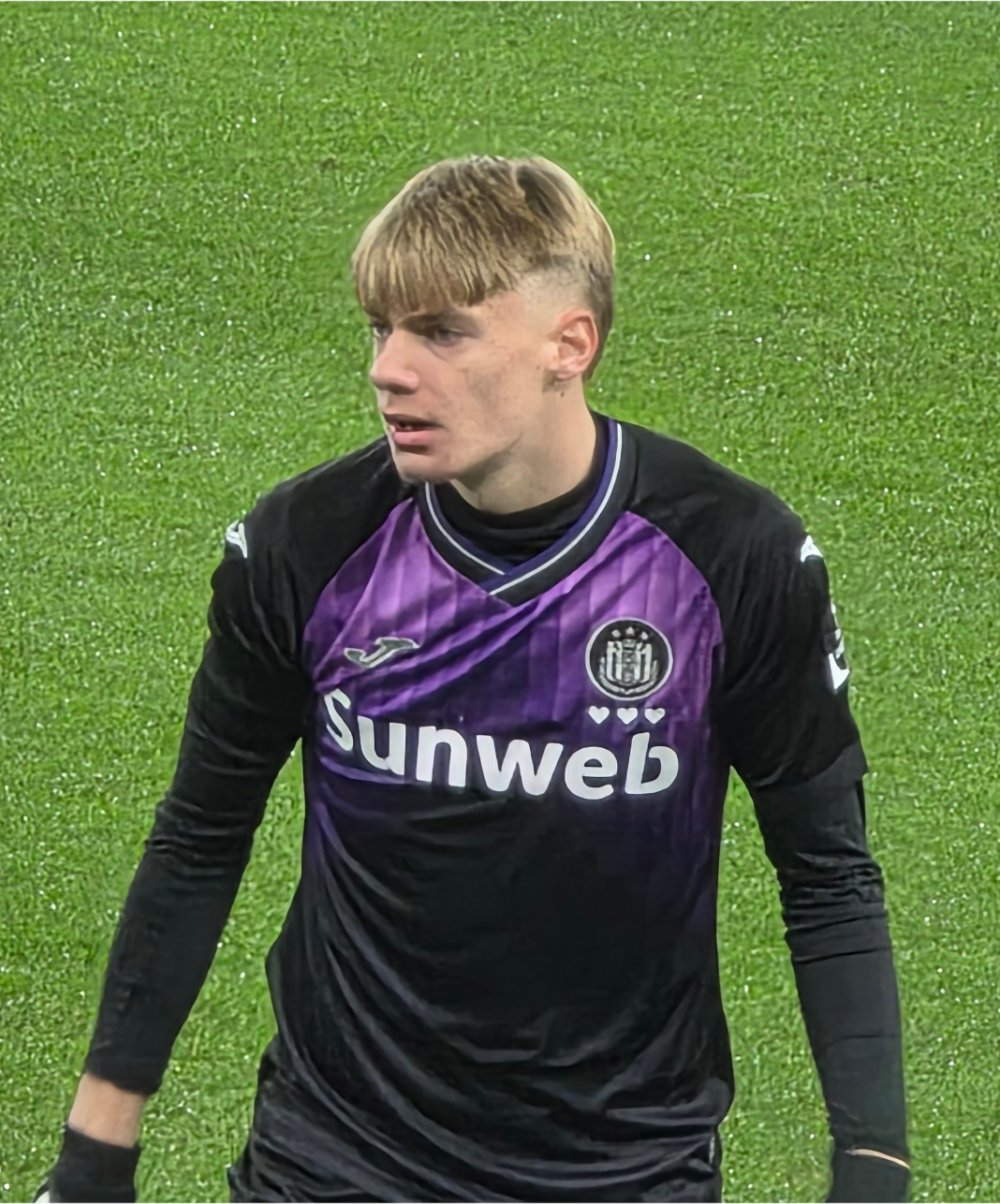
De Cat with Anderlecht in 2025.

=== Anderlecht ===
De Cat is a youth product of Anderlecht having joined them at age 10, and he signed his first professional contract with them in October 2023, valid until June 2025. He made his professional debut on 22 February 2024, in a 0–1 Challenger Pro League away win against SL16 FC. On 27 August 2024, De Cat extended his contract with Anderlecht until 2027, and was promoted to the senior squad.

On 20 February 2025, he made his first team debut for Anderlecht in UEFA Europa League knockout game against Fenerbahçe, coming on as a substitute. He is one of the youngest debutants for Anderlecht at 16 years, 7 months and 1 day.

He made his professional league debut as a 1-minute substitute vs Racing Genk on 6 April in a Jupiler Pro League Champions’ Playoffs match, coming on in the 90th minute.

On 1 May 2025, he scored his first goal for RSC Anderlecht against Royal Antwerp FC in a Jupiler Pro League Champions’ playoffs match, after coming on as a substitute for Majeed Ashimeru.

=== TSG Hoffenheim ===
On 10 July 2026, De Cat moved to Bundesliga side TSG Hoffenheim, signing a long-term contract until 2031. His transfer fee was reportedly €20 million, with €4 million in potential bonuses, and a future sale percentage retained by Anderlecht.

== International career ==
De Cat is a youth international for Belgium. He was part of the Belgian U17 team who reached the semi-finals of the 2025 UEFA European Under-17 Championship, where he was named in the Team of the Tournament.

On 28 March 2026, he made his senior debut for Belgium as a substitute in a 5–2 friendly victory over the United States.

== Style of play ==
De Cat was included in The Guardian's "Next Generation 2025: 60 of the best young talents in world football", where he was described as a "towering midfielder", and further "He is a fighter, but loves dribbling too".

== Career statistics ==
=== Club ===
As of match played 15 October 2026

Appearances and goals by club, season and competition
Club	Season	League			National cup		Europe		Other		Total	
Club	Season	Division	Apps	Goals	Apps	Goals	Apps	Goals	Apps	Goals	Apps	Goals
RSCA Futures	2023–24	Challenger Pro League	10	0	—		—		—		10	0
RSCA Futures	2024–25	Challenger Pro League	23	3	—		—		—		23	3
RSCA Futures	Total		33	3	—		—		—		33	3
Anderlecht	2024–25	Belgian Pro League	6	1	0	0	1 (Note: Appearance(s) in UEFA Europa League)	0	—		7	1
Anderlecht	2025–26	Belgian Pro League	36	2	5	1	5 (Note: One appearance in UEFA Europa League, four appearances in UEFA Conference League)	0	—		46	3
Anderlecht	Total		42	3	5	1	6	0	—		53	4
TSG Hoffenheim	2026–27	Bundesliga	2	0	1	0	2	0	—		5	0
Career total			77	6	6	1	8	0	0	0	90	7

=== International ===
As of match played 29 March 2026

Appearances and goals by national team and year
National team	Year	Apps	Goals
Belgium	2026	1	0
Total		1	0

== Honours ==
Individual

- UEFA European Under-17 Championship Team of the Tournament: 2025
- Belgian Promise of the Year: 2025
