= Djibril Coulibaly (footballer, born 2008) =

French footballer (born 2008)

Personal information
- Date of birth: 18 November 2008 (age 17)
- Place of birth: Pontoise, France
- Height: 1.90 m (6 ft 3 in)
- Position: Midfielder

Team information
- Current team: Nice
- Number: 39

Youth career
- 2014–2017: AS Courdimanche
- 2017–2023: Cergy Pontoise
- 2023–2025: Nice

Senior career*
Years	Team	Apps	(Gls)
2025–	Nice	8	(0)

International career^{‡}
2025	France U17	8	(2)
2025–	France U18	2	(0)
2026–	France U19	3	(0)
Medal record
Men's football
Representing France
UEFA European Under-17 Championship
Runner-up	2025 Albania
- * Club domestic league appearances and goals as of 17:30, 11 October 2026 (UTC) ‡ National team caps and goals as of 22:15, 1 October 2026 (UTC)

Djibril Coulibaly (born 18 November 2008) is a French professional footballer who plays as a midfielder for Ligue 1 club Nice.

== Career ==
Coulibaly is a product of the youth academies of AS Courdimanche, Cergy Pontoise, and Nice. On 10 May 2025, he signed his first professional contract with Nice. He debuted with the senior Nice side in a 2–0 loss to Benfica in a 2025–26 UEFA Champions League qualifying match on 12 August 2025.

== International career ==
Born in France, Coulibaly is of Malian descent. He made the France U17 squad for the 2025 UEFA European Under-17 Championship.

== Career statistics ==
As of match played 11 October 2026

Appearances and goals by club, season and competition
Club	Season	League			Coupe de France		Europe		Other		Total	
Club	Season	Division	Apps	Goals	Apps	Goals	Apps	Goals	Apps	Goals	Apps	Goals
Nice	2025–26	Ligue 1	2	0	1	0	2 (Note: One appearance in UEFA Champions League, one appearance in UEFA Europa League)	0	2 (Note: Appearances in Ligue 1 relegation/promotion play-offs)	0	7	0
Nice	2026–27	Ligue 1	6	0	0	0	—		—		6	0
Career total			8	0	1	0	2	0	2	0	13	0

== Honours ==
Nice

- Coupe de France runner-up: 2025–26

France U17

- UEFA European Under-17 Championship runner-up: 2025
