= Martim Chelmik =

Portuguese footballer (born 2008)

Personal information
- Full name: Martim Chelmik Santos Antunes
- Date of birth: 13 June 2008 (age 18)
- Place of birth: Porto, Portugal
- Position: Defender

Team information
- Current team: Porto B
- Number: 94

Youth career
- Porto

Senior career*
Years	Team	Apps	(Gls)
2026–	Porto B	1	(0)

International career^{‡}
2023	Portugal U15	2	(0)
2023–2024	Portugal U16	7	(0)
2024–	Portugal U17	21	(1)
2025–	Portugal U18	5	(0)
Medal record
Men's football
Representing Portugal
FIFA U-17 World Cup
Winner	2025 Qatar
UEFA European Under-17 Championship
Winner	2025 Albania
- * Club domestic league appearances and goals ‡ National team caps and goals as of 27 November 2025

Martim Chelmik Santos Antunes (born 13 June 2008) is a Portuguese professional footballer who plays as a defender for Porto B.

== Club career ==
As a youth player, Chelmik joined the youth academy of Porto. Ahead of the 2025–26 season, he was promoted to the club's under-19 team, where he played in the UEFA Youth League.

== International career ==
Chelmik is a Portugal youth international. During May and June 2025, he helped the Portugal national under-17 football team win the 2025 UEFA European Under-17 Championship.

== Style of play ==
Chelmik plays as a defender. Portuguese news website Cracques.pt wrote in 2025 that he "is one of the most promising players in Portuguese football, a central defender who combines tactical maturity with an imposing physique".

== Honours ==
Portugal U17

- FIFA U-17 World Cup: 2025
- UEFA European Under-17 Championship: 2025
