= Thomas Campaniello =

Italian footballer (born 2008)

Personal information
- Date of birth: 29 February 2008 (age 18)
- Place of birth: Certaldo, Italy
- Height: 1.80 m (5 ft 11 in)
- Position: Forward

Team information
- Current team: Fiorentina U20 (on loan from Empoli)
- Number: 29

Youth career
- –2015: Certaldese Giovani
- 2015–: Empoli
- 2026–: → Fiorentina (loan)

Senior career*
Years	Team	Apps	(Gls)
2024–	Empoli	3	(0)

International career^{‡}
2022–2023	Italy U15	8	(4)
2023–2024	Italy U16	12	(4)
2024–2025	Italy U17	25	(10)
2024–2026	Italy U18	6	(2)
Medal record
Men's football
Representing Italy
FIFA U-17 World Cup
Third place	2025 Qatar
UEFA European Under-17 Championship
Winner	2024 Cyprus
- * Club domestic league appearances and goals as of 23 August 2025 ‡ National team caps and goals as of 31 March 2026

Thomas Campaniello (born 29 February 2008) is an Italian professional footballer who plays as a forward for the under-20 squad (Campionato Primavera 1) of Serie A club Fiorentina, on loan from Empoli.

== Early life ==
Campaniello was born on 29 February 2008. Born in Certaldo, Italy, he is of Polish descent through his mother.

== Club career ==
As a youth player, Campaniello joined the youth academy of Certaldese Giovani. In 2015, he joined the youth academy of Empoli and was promoted to the club's first team in 2024. On 23 February 2025, he debuted for them during a 5–0 home loss to Atalanta in the league.

On 1 September 2026, Fiorentina loaned Campaniello for their under-19 squad.

== International career ==
Campaniello is an Italy youth international, having represented the under-15, under-16, under-17, under-18s.

With the U17 side he won the 2024 UEFA European Under-17 Championship, and also finished in third place at the 2025 FIFA U-17 World Cup.

== Style of play ==
Campaniello plays as a forward. Italian newspaper Il Tirreno wrote in 2025 that "his tactical intelligence allows him to also move into more withdrawn positions... gifted with great speed and excellent ball control, Thomas is skilled both in off-the-ball runs and in dribbling".

== Honours ==
Italy U17

- FIFA U-17 World Cup third place: 2025
- UEFA European Under-17 Championship: 2024
