= Laurence Giani =

Italian footballer (born 2008)

Personal information
- Full name: Laurence Adam Giani
- Date of birth: 11 March 2008 (age 18)
- Place of birth: Crewe, England
- Height: 1.78 m (5 ft 10 in)
- Position: Left-back

Team information
- Current team: Stoke City
- Number: 52

Youth career
- 2017–: Stoke City

Senior career*
Years	Team	Apps	(Gls)
2026–	Stoke City	0	(0)

International career^{‡}
2024–2025	Italy U17	12	(0)
2025–	Italy U18	4	(0)
- * Club domestic league appearances and goals ‡ National team caps and goals as of 12 October 2025

Laurence Adam Giani (born 11 March 2008) is a professional footballer who plays as a left-back for EFL Championship club Stoke City. Born in England, he is an Italy youth international.

== Early life ==
Giani was born in Crewe, England and grew up in Northwich and attended St Nicholas Catholic High School. The son of Marcello Giani, he has two older brothers. Growing up, he regarded Italy international Paolo Maldini as his football idol and was a supporter of Serie A side AC Milan.

== Club career ==
Giani joined the Stoke City's academy at the age of nine and was first involved with the club's senior team in 2024. On 29 October 2024, he was named on the bench of the senior team for the first time during a 3–2 away loss to Southampton in the EFL Cup. Giani signed his first professional contract in July 2025. Giani made his first team debut for Stoke on 25 August 2026, in a EFL Cup match against Hull City.

== International career ==
Giani is an Italy youth international. During the summer of 2025, he played for the Italy national under-17 football team at the 2025 UEFA European Under-17 Championship.

== Style of play ==
Giani plays as a defender and is left-footed. Italian news website MondoPrimavera wrote in 2025 that he "stands out for his speed, intensity, and good physical strength, considering his 178 cm height. These qualities allow him to be effective both defensively and offensively. He also has excellent footwork".

== Career statistics ==
As of match played 25 August 2026

Appearances and goals by club, season and competition
Club	Season	League			FA Cup		League Cup		Other		Total	
Club	Season	Division	Apps	Goals	Apps	Goals	Apps	Goals	Apps	Goals	Apps	Goals
Stoke City	2026–27	Championship	0	0	0	0	1	0	—		1	0
Career total			0	0	0	0	1	0	0	0	1	0
