= Miguel Figueiredo =

Portuguese footballer (born 2008)

Personal information
- Full name: Miguel Lebre Monteiro Figueiredo
- Date of birth: 2 August 2008 (age 18)
- Place of birth: Aveiro, Portugal
- Height: 1.87 m (6 ft 2 in)
- Position: Midfielder

Team information
- Current team: Benfica B
- Number: 73

Youth career
- 2016–2020: CB Estarreja
- 2020–2026: Benfica

Senior career*
Years	Team	Apps	(Gls)
2025–	Benfica B	27	(1)
2026–	Benfica	0	(0)

International career^{‡}
2025	Portugal U17	3	(1)
2025	Portugal U18	5	(0)
2026–	Portugal U19	5	(0)
- * Club domestic league appearances and goals as of 10:27, 23 September 2026 (UTC) ‡ National team caps and goals as of 10:27, 23 September 2026 (UTC)

Miguel Lebre Monteiro Figueiredo (born 2 August 2008) is a Portuguese professional footballer who plays as a midfielder for Benfica B.

== Club career ==
Born in Aveiro, Figueiredo began playing as a youth for Casa do Benfica de Estarreja in 2016, before joining Benfica's academy in 2020. He won national titles at under-15, under-17 and under-19 level. In November 2024, aged 16, he signed his first professional contract.

In March 2026, having scored once in 16 games for Benfica B in Liga Portugal 2 as well as two goals in five games of the UEFA Youth League, Figueiredo was called up by first-team manager José Mourinho for a game away to Arouca, due to Enzo Barrenechea's injury. Under successor Marco Silva, he was chosen in July for a UEFA Europa League second qualifying round first leg game away to St. Gallen in Switzerland, and made his debut as a starter in a 2–1 defeat on 23 July. Silva praised his performance.

== International career ==
Figueiredo was chosen for the Portugal under-17 team for the 2025 FIFA U-17 World Cup in Qatar. In the round of 16, he scored in a 5–0 win over Mexico. He was an unused substitute in the final, a 1–0 win over Austria on 27 November.
