= Ilyas Azizi =

French footballer (born 2008)

Personal information
- Date of birth: 13 April 2008 (age 18)
- Place of birth: Toulouse, France
- Height: 1.73 m (5 ft 8 in)
- Positions: Winger; attacking midfielder

Team information
- Current team: Toulouse

Youth career
- 2014–2019: Fonbeauzard
- 2019–2025: Toulouse

Senior career*
Years	Team	Apps	(Gls)
2024–	Toulouse II	13	(2)
2026–	Toulouse	3	(0)

International career^{‡}
2023–2024	France U16	10	(2)
2024–2025	France U17	13	(6)
Medal record
Men's football
Representing France
UEFA European Under-17 Championship
Runner-up	2025 Albania
- * Club domestic league appearances and goals as of 21:11, 25 April 2026 (UTC) ‡ National team caps and goals as of 1 June 2025

Ilyas Azizi (born 13 April 2008) is a French professional footballer who plays as a winger or attacking midfielder for Ligue 1 club Toulouse.

== Club career ==
Born in Toulouse, Azizi started playing football at local club Fonbeauzard, before joining FC Toulouse youth academy in 2019. On 4 May 2025, he was included in Toulouse's first team matchday squad for the first time, being in the bench for the Ligue 1 match against Rennes.

== International career ==
Being of Moroccan descent, Azizi represented France at youth level. With France U17, he featured at the 2025 UEFA European Under-17 Championship and scored in the opening game against Germany 45 seconds in the game. It became of one the quickest goal of the tournament history.

== Career statistics ==
As of match played 10 May 2025

Appearances and goals by club, season and competition
Club	Season	League			National cup		Continental		Other		Total	
Club	Season	Division	Apps	Goals	Apps	Goals	Apps	Goals	Apps	Goals	Apps	Goals
Toulouse II	2024–25	Championnat National 3	10	2	—		—		—		10	2
Career total			10	2	0	0	0	0	0	0	10	2

== Honours ==
France U17

- UEFA European Under-17 Championship runner-up: 2025
