= Jesse Bisiwu =

Belgian footballer (born 2008)

Personal information
- Full name: Jesse Eugen Kwabena Bisiwu
- Date of birth: 22 January 2008 (age 18)
- Place of birth: Leuven, Belgium
- Height: 1.85 m (6 ft 1 in)
- Position: Winger

Team information
- Current team: Barcelona B
- Number: 24

Youth career
- –2023: Club Brugge

Senior career*
Years	Team	Apps	(Gls)
2023–2026	Club NXT	36	(2)
2026–	Barcelona B	1	(0)
2026–	Barcelona	0	(0)

International career^{‡}
2023	Belgium U15	7	(1)
2024	Belgium U16	1	(0)
2024–2025	Belgium U17	10	(1)
2025	Belgium U18	6	(0)
2026–	Belgium U19	4	(1)
2026–	Belgium U21	2	(0)
- * Club domestic league appearances and goals as of 13 September 2026 ‡ National team caps and goals as of 15:41, 18 November 2026 (UTC)

Jesse Eugen Kwabena Bisiwu (born 22 January 2008) is a Belgian professional footballer who plays as a left winger for Segunda Federación club Barcelona Atlètic.

== Club career ==
=== Club Brugge ===
A product of the youth academy at Club Brugge, at the age of fourteen years-old, Bisiwu was allowed to play in a friendly match for the first team that trained whilst the winter World Cup in Qatar took place.

Bisiwu played for Club NXT in the Challenger Pro League as a 15-year-old during the 2023–24 season. The following season, his performances including a notable goal against Beveren which involved him running almost the entire field, and a goal against RFC Liège in April 2025 as his side came back from 1–0 down to win 2–1 in injury time. Bisiwu extended his contract with Club Brugge during the 2024–25 season.

=== Barcelona ===
On 31 July 2026, Bisiwu joined La Liga club Barcelona, signing a contract until 30 June 2031 for 8,5m . He was registered with the reserves, but was also issued squad number 27 with the first team as well.

== International career ==
A Belgian youth international, Bisiwu was named for the Belgium national under-17 football team squad for 2025 UEFA European Under-17 Championship. Holding dual nationality, he has not ruled out representing Ghana in the future.

== Style of play ==
Bisiwu is noted for his dribbling ability on the wing, and has been nicknamed a "contortionist". There has been a comparison with the style of play of Khalilou Fadiga and Florent Malouda .

== Honours ==
Individual

- UEFA European Under-17 Championship Team of the Tournament: 2025
