= Yoan Pereira =

Portuguese footballer (born 2008)

Personal information
- Full name: Yoan da Silva Pereira
- Date of birth: 8 April 2008 (age 18)
- Place of birth: Luxembourg
- Height: 1.75 m (5 ft 9 in)
- Positions: Defender; winger

Team information
- Current team: Porto B
- Number: 55

Youth career
- –2017: CS Oberkorn
- 2017–2019: FC Rodange 91
- 2020–2021: Racing FC Union Luxembourg
- 2022: SC Alba
- 2022–: Porto

Senior career*
Years	Team	Apps	(Gls)
2025–	Porto B	6	(0)

International career^{‡}
2024–	Portugal U17	22	(4)
2025–	Portugal U18	6	(0)
Medal record
Men's football
Representing Portugal
FIFA U-17 World Cup
Winner	2025 Qatar
UEFA European Under-17 Championship
Winner	2025 Albania
- * Club domestic league appearances and goals as of 6 June 2026 ‡ National team caps and goals as of 27 November 2025

Yoan da Silva Pereira (born 8 April 2008) is a footballer who plays as a defender or winger for Porto B. Born in Luxembourg, he is a Portugal youth international.

== Club career ==
As a youth player, Pereira joined the youth academy of Luxembourgish side CS Oberkorn. In 2017, he joined the youth academy of Luxembourgish side FC Rodange 91.

Following his stint there, he joined the youth academy of Luxembourgish side Racing FC Union Luxembourg in 2020. Subsequently, he joined the youth academy of Portuguese side SC Alba in 2022. Ahead of the 2022–23 season, he joined the youth academy of Portuguese side FC Porto.

== International career ==
Pereira is a Portugal youth international. During November 2025, he helped the Portugal national under-17 football team win the 2025 FIFA U-17 World Cup.

== Style of play ==
Pereira plays as a defender or winger. Left-footed, he is known for his versatility.

== Honours ==
Portugal U17

- FIFA U-17 World Cup: 2025
- UEFA European Under-17 Championship: 2025
