= Djylian N'Guessan =

French footballer (born 2008)

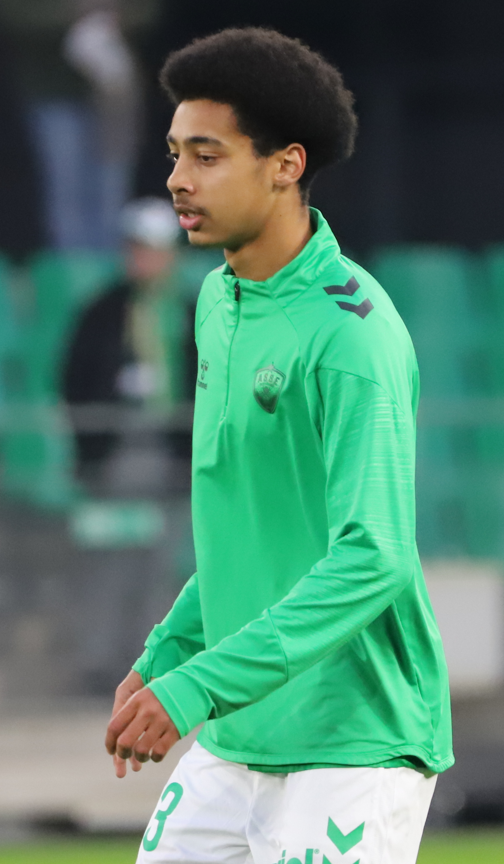

Personal information
- Full name: Djylian N'Guessan
- Date of birth: 30 August 2008 (age 18)
- Place of birth: Saint-Nazaire, France
- Height: 1.80 m (5 ft 11 in)
- Positions: Forward; winger

Team information
- Current team: Brest (on loan from Saint-Étienne)
- Number: 39

Youth career
- 2015–: Saint-Étienne

Senior career*
| Years | Team | Apps | (Gls) |
| 2024– | Saint-Étienne II | 14 | (4) |
| 2025– | Saint-Étienne | 11 | (0) |
| 2026– | → Brest (loan) | 2 | (0) |

International career^{‡}
| 2023–2024 | France U16 | 14 | (12) |
| 2024–2025 | France U17 | 11 | (11) |
| 2025– | France U20 | 7 | (0) |
Medal record
Men's football
Representing France
UEFA European Under-17 Championship
| Runner-up | 2025 Albania |
- * Club domestic league appearances and goals as of 3 October 2026 ‡ National team caps and goals as of 18 October 2025

Djylian N'Guessan (born 30 August 2008) is a French professional footballer who plays as a forward or winger for Ligue 1 club Brest, on loan from Ligue 2 club Saint-Étienne. He has agreed to join Premier League club Liverpool in January 2027.

== Club career ==
=== Saint-Étienne ===
A product of the Saint-Étienne academy, he played for their U17 side during the 2022–23 season at the age of 14. He signed his first professional contract with Saint-Etienne in November 2024. He made his professional debut at the age of 16, coming on as a substitute for Saint-Étienne in a 3–1 Ligue 1 win against Reims on 4 January 2025. Following a second substitute appearance the subsequent week against PSG, he made his first start for Saint-Étienne against Nantes on 19 January 2025.

=== Liverpool ===
On 4 September 2026, N'Guessan agreed to join Liverpool from January 2027 under a pre‑contract deal, with the transfer fee reported at £4.3m including add-ons. He will spend the rest of the season on loan at Brest.

== International career ==
N'Guessan was born in France to an Ivorian father and French mother. He is a France youth international, having represented his country up to the under-17 level.

== Personal life ==
N'Guessan is the son of former professional player Dany who retired from playing in 2017.

== Honours ==
France U17

- UEFA European Under-17 Championship runner-up: 2025

Individual

- UEFA European Under-17 Championship Team of the Tournament: 2025
