= Italy national under-18 football team =

National association football team

Italy Under-18
- Nickname: Gli Azzurrini (The Little Blues)
- Association: Italian Football Federation (FIGC)
- Confederation: UEFA (Europe)
- Head coach: Daniele Franceschini
- Top scorer: Emiliano Bonazzoli (7, prior-2001); Luca Vido (5, post-2001)
First colours	Second colours

First international
- Italy 0–1 United States (Montecatini Terme, Italy; 16 August 1991); Italy 0–1 Germany (Bolzano, Italy; 14 February 2002)
Medal record
Mediterranean Games
Silver medal – second place	2018 Tarragona	Men's tournament

The Italian national under-18 football team represents Italy in international football at an under-18 age level and is controlled by the Italian Football Federation (Federazione Italiana Gioco Calcio), the governing body for football in Italy. The team was known as Italy national under-17 football team prior 2001.

The current coach is Daniele Franceschini.

The under-18 team were compose of players from Italy national under-17 football team of the previous season, as well as new call-up. The team acted as the feeder team of Italy national under-19 football team, which compete in UEFA European Under-19 Championship.

Before 2001, the name of the under-18 team was Italian national under-17 football team (as well as the current under-19 team, was named under-18). However, the age limit of the team was always under-17 (calendar age) at the start of season, or under-18 (calendar age) at the end of season. In the past, the cut-off date was on 1 August instead of 1 January.

== Current squad ==
The following players were called up for the friendly matches against South Korea, United Arab Emirates and Croatia on 3, 6 and 9 September 2025.

Caps and goals correct as of 9 September 2025, after the match against Croatia.

No.	Pos.	Player	Date of birth (age)	Caps	Goals	Club
1	GK	Alessandro Longoni	31 January 2008 (age 18)	2	0	(Italian Football Federation) Milan
12	GK	Francesco Cereser	5 January 2008 (age 18)	1	0	(Italian Football Federation) Torino
2	DF	Dauda Iddrisa	8 January 2008 (age 18)	2	0	(The Football Association) West Bromwich Albion
3	DF	Laurence Giani	11 March 2008 (age 18)	2	0	(The Football Association) Stoke City
5	DF	Leonardo Bovio	4 February 2008 (age 18)	2	0	(Italian Football Federation) Inter
6	DF	Alessandro Rinaldi	10 January 2008 (age 18)	2	0	(Italian Football Federation) Atalanta
13	DF	Jean Mambuku	8 July 2008 (age 18)	2	0	(French Football Federation) Stade de Reims
15	DF	Cristiano De Paoli	27 January 2008 (age 18)	2	0	(Italian Football Federation) Udinese
16	DF	Gabriele Colaciuri	6 June 2008 (age 18)	1	0	(Italian Football Federation) Fiorentina
23	DF	Davide Sorino	2 March 2008 (age 18)	1	1	(Italian Football Federation) Inter
	DF	Davide Pavesi	15 February 2008 (age 18)	0	0	(Italian Football Federation) Cremonese
4	MF	Vincenzo Prisco	27 August 2008 (age 18)	2	0	(Italian Football Federation) Napoli
8	MF	Federico Steffanoni	4 September 2008 (age 18)	3	0	(Italian Football Federation) Atalanta
11	MF	Andrea Luongo	16 February 2008 (age 18)	3	1	(Italian Football Federation) Torino
14	MF	Alessio Baralla	5 February 2008 (age 18)	2	0	(Italian Football Federation) Empoli
17	MF	Valerio Maccaroni	3 June 2008 (age 18)	1	0	(Italian Football Federation) Roma
18	MF	Fabio Pandolfi	24 May 2008 (age 18)	3	0	(Italian Football Federation) Milan
7	FW	Destiny Elimoghale	23 April 2009 (age 17)	2	2	(Italian Football Federation) Juventus
9	FW	Antonio Arena	10 February 2009 (age 17)	2	0	(Italian Football Federation) Roma
10	FW	Samuele Inácio	2 April 2008 (age 18)	1	0	(German Football Association) Borussia Dortmund
19	FW	Luca Costa	28 January 2008 (age 18)	2	0	(Italian Football Federation) Cagliari
20	FW	Edoardo Zanaga	13 March 2008 (age 18)	2	0	(Italian Football Federation) Empoli
21	FW	Danilo Busiello	22 June 2008 (age 18)	2	0	(Italian Football Federation) Empoli
