= August De Wannemacker =

Belgian footballer (born 2008)

Personal information
- Full name: August Jan T. De Wannemacker
- Date of birth: 25 December 2008 (age 17)
- Place of birth: Belgium
- Position: Midfielder

Team information
- Current team: Genk
- Number: 56

Youth career
- KSCE Mariakerke
- Racing Gent
- –2022: Gent
- 2022–2024: Genk

Senior career*
Years	Team	Apps	(Gls)
2024–	Jong Genk	32	(2)
2024–	Genk	3	(0)

International career^{‡}
2023–2024	Belgium U16	7	(0)
2024–2025	Belgium U17	14	(3)
2025	Belgium U18	2	(0)
2026–	Belgium U19	3	(1)
- * Club domestic league appearances and goals as of 10 October 2026 ‡ National team caps and goals as of 18:25, 5 October 2026 (UTC)

August Jan T. De Wannemacker (born 25 December 2008) is a Belgian professional footballer who plays as a midfielder for KRC Genk.

== Club career ==
He started as a 4-year-old at KSCE Mariakerke and played there for 4 seasons. He then made the switch to Racing Gent for one season. He then played as a left forward at the youth academy at KAA Gent for the next four seasons. He joined the youth set-up at KRC Genk from Gent in 2022, and signed his first professional contract with Genk as a 15-year-old in January 2024. He made his senior debut with Jong Genk in the Challenger Pro League against Lommel SK on 25 October 2024.

== International career ==
A Belgian youth international, he scored for the Belgium national under-17 football team against Kosovo U17 in October 2024. He was subsequently named in their squad for 2025 UEFA European Under-17 Championship.

== Style of play ==
He has been praised for his football intelligence and versatility, being able to play in different positions on the field, but also having enough toughness to play central midfield.

== Career statistics ==
As of match played 10 October 2026

Appearances and goals by club, season and competition
Club	Season	League			Cup		Europe		Other		Total	
Club	Season	Division	Apps	Goals	Apps	Goals	Apps	Goals	Apps	Goals	Apps	Goals
Jong Genk	2024–25	Challenger Pro League	7	0	—		—		—		7	0
Jong Genk	2025–26	Challenger Pro League	25	2	—		—		—		25	2
Jong Genk	Total		32	2	—		—		—		32	2
Genk	2025–26	Belgian Pro League	2	0	—		—		—		2	0
Genk	2026–27	Belgian Pro League	1	0	0	0	—		—		1	0
Genk	Total		3	0	0	0	0	0	—		3	0
Career total			35	2	0	0	0	0	0	0	35	2
