= Hugo Sochůrek =

Czech footballer (born 2008)

Personal information
- Date of birth: 7 June 2008 (age 18)
- Place of birth: Tábor, Czech Republic
- Height: 1.84 m (6 ft 0 in)
- Position: Midfielder

Team information
- Current team: Sparta Prague
- Number: 38

Youth career
- –2020: Táborsko
- 2020–: Sparta Prague

Senior career*
Years	Team	Apps	(Gls)
2025–	Sparta Prague	8	(0)
2025–	Sparta Prague B	5	(0)

International career^{‡}
2023–2024	Czech Republic U16	12	(1)
2024–2025	Czech Republic U17	13	(2)
2025–	Czech Republic U18	8	(0)
2026–	Czech Republic U19	3	(0)
2026–	Czech Republic	1	(0)
- * Club domestic league appearances and goals as of 24 May 2026 ‡ National team caps and goals as of 31 May 2026

Hugo Sochůrek (born 7 June 2008) is a Czech professional footballer who plays as a midfielder for Sparta Prague and the Czech Republic national team.

== Early life ==
Sochůrek was born on 7 June 2008 in Tábor, Czech Republic.

== Club career ==
As a youth player, Sochůrek joined the youth academy of Táborsko. Following his stint there, he joined the youth academy of Sparta Prague in 2020 and was promoted to the club's senior team in 2026.

== International career ==
Sochůrek is a Czech Republic youth international. During the spring of 2026, he played for the Czech Republic national under-19 football team for 2026 UEFA European Under-19 Championship qualification.

On 31 May 2026, he was named in the Czech Republic's squad for the 2026 FIFA World Cup.

== Style of play ==
Sochůrek plays as a midfielder. Czech news website Aktuálně.cz wrote in 2026 that "Sochůrek's playing profile is unusual in the Chance Liga, and certainly not among Czech players. In a time when mileage, duels and set pieces are the main focus, players like Sochůrek are all the more valuable".

== Career statistics ==
=== Club ===
As of match played 24 May 2026

Club	Season	League			Cup		Europe		Other		Total	
Club	Season	Division	Apps	Goals	Apps	Goals	Apps	Goals	Apps	Goals	Apps	Goals
Sparta Prague	2025–26	Czech First League	8	0	1	0	1 (Note: Appearance in UEFA Conference League)	0	—		10	0
Sparta Prague B	2025–26	Czech National Football League	5	0	—		—		—		5	0
Career total			13	0	1	0	1	0	0	0	15	0

=== International ===
As of match played 31 May 2026

Appearances and goals by national team and year
National team	Year	Apps	Goals
Czech Republic	2026	1	0
Total		1	0
