= Samuele Inácio =

Italian footballer (born 2008)

Personal information
- Full name: Samuele Inácio Piá
- Date of birth: 2 April 2008 (age 18)
- Place of birth: Bergamo, Italy
- Height: 1.76 m (5 ft 9 in)
- Positions: Forward; attacking midfielder; winger

Team information
- Current team: Borussia Dortmund
- Number: 40

Youth career
- –2024: Atalanta
- 2024–2025: Borussia Dortmund

Senior career*
Years	Team	Apps	(Gls)
2026	Borussia Dortmund II	4	(1)
2026–	Borussia Dortmund	9	(1)

International career^{‡}
2022–2023	Italy U15	14	(7)
2023	Italy U16	4	(1)
2024–2025	Italy U17	15	(9)
2025	Italy U18	9	(4)
2026	Italy U19	1	(1)
2026–	Italy U21	2	(0)
2026–	Italy	1	(0)
Medal record
Men's football
Representing Italy
FIFA U-17 World Cup
Third place	2025 Qatar
- * Club domestic league appearances and goals as of 31 October 2026 ‡ National team caps and goals as of 16 November 2026

Samuele Inácio Piá (born 2 April 2008) is an Italian professional footballer who plays as a forward, attacking midfielder, or winger for Bundesliga club Borussia Dortmund and the Italy national team.

== Early life ==
Inácio was born on 2 April 2008 in Bergamo, Italy. He is the son of Brazilian former footballer Piá, and the nephew of Brazilian former footballer Joelson. His mother is a native of Bergamo.

== Club career ==
=== Youth ===
Inácio started playing football at the age of five, starting at the youth clubs of Mapello and Marigolda before eventually joining Atalanta's youth sector. In summer 2024, aged 16, Inácio joined the youth academy of German side Borussia Dortmund.

=== Borussia Dortmund ===
On 28 February 2026, at 17 years old, he made his debut with the Borussia Dortmund senior team during a 3–2 home loss Bundesliga match against Bayern Munich in Der Klassiker, substituting Maximilian Beier at the 75th minute. Later that year, on 8 May, he scored his first Bundesliga goal in a 3–2 victory over Eintracht Frankfurt.

== International career ==
=== Youth ===
Inácio is an Italy youth international, making his debut starting with the Italy national under-15 team. With the Italy national under-17 team, he took part in the 2025 UEFA European Under-17 Championship in which he was the top scorer with five goals, and in the 2025 FIFA U-17 World Cup, scoring four goals and reaching the third place.

He was called-up with the U21s for the first time by head coach Silvio Baldini for the friendly matches against France and Belgium on 13 and 16 November 2026 respectively, and he made his debut in the match won 2–1 away against France.

=== Senior ===
In May 2026, Inácio was one of the players who were called up with the Italy national senior team by interim head coach Silvio Baldini, for the friendly matches against Luxembourg and Greece. On 3 June 2026, he made his debut, as a substitute, in a 1–0 win over Luxembourg.

== Style of play ==
Inácio mainly operates as a forward, and can also operate as an attacking midfielder or as a winger. He has been described as "impressed... with his high level of game intelligence, his ability to use both feet and a good sense of space".

He has regarded Belgium international Kevin de Bruyne and Brazil international Neymar as his football idols.

== Career statistics ==
=== Club ===
As of match played 31 October 2026

Appearances and goals by club, season and competition
Club	Season	League			DFB-Pokal		Europe		Other		Total	
Club	Season	Division	Apps	Goals	Apps	Goals	Apps	Goals	Apps	Goals	Apps	Goals
Borussia Dortmund II	2025–26	Regionalliga West	4	1	—		—		—		4	1
Borussia Dortmund	2025–26	Bundesliga	7	1	0	0	0	0	—		7	1
Borussia Dortmund	2026–27	Bundesliga	2	0	1	2	1 (Note: Appearances in UEFA Champions League)	0	1 (Note: Appearance in Franz Beckenbauer Supercup)	0	5	2
Borussia Dortmund	Total		9	1	1	2	1	0	1	0	12	3
Career total			13	2	1	2	1	0	1	0	16	4

=== International ===
As of match played 3 June 2026

Appearances and goals by national team and year
National team	Year	Apps	Goals
Italy	2026	1	0
Total		1	0

== Honours ==
Italy U17

- FIFA U-17 World Cup third place: 2025

Individual

- UEFA European Under-17 Championship top scorer: 2025
- UEFA European Under-17 Championship Team of the Tournament: 2025
