= Rafael Quintas =

Portuguese footballer (born 2008)

Personal information
- Full name: Rafael José Mestre Quintas
- Date of birth: 8 March 2008 (age 18)
- Place of birth: Lisbon, Portugal
- Position: Defensive midfielder

Team information
- Current team: Benfica

Youth career
- 2013–: Benfica

International career^{‡}
Years	Team	Apps	(Gls)
2023	Portugal U15	4	(0)
2023–2024	Portugal U16	8	(0)
2024–	Portugal U17	21	(2)
Medal record
Men's football
Representing Portugal
FIFA U-17 World Cup
Winner	2025 Qatar
UEFA European Under-17 Championship
Winner	2025 Albania
- ‡ National team caps and goals as of 2 June 2025

Rafael José Mestre Quintas (born 8 March 2008) is a Portuguese footballer who plays as a defensive midfielder for Benfica.

== Early career ==
Born in Lisbon, Quintas joined Benfica in 2013. There, he distinguished himself with the youth categories of the team. He was given the captain’s armband after signing his first professional contract in April 2024.

== International career ==
Quintas was named in Portugal U17's squad for the 2025 UEFA European Under-17 Championship. As the team captain, Quintas made an immediate impact by netting the first goal in the competition’s opening game against host nation Albania. Portugal then progressed to the final after overcoming Italy on penalties in the semi-finals. They then claimed the trophy by defeating France 3–0 in the final. A key player in Portugal's victorious campaign, Quintas was named as the Player of the Tournament, having started every match.

== Honours ==
Portugal U17

- FIFA U-17 World Cup: 2025
- UEFA European Under-17 Championship: 2025

Individual

- UEFA European Under-17 Championship Player of the Tournament: 2025
- UEFA European Under-17 Championship Team of the Tournament: 2025
