= Romário Cunha =

Portuguese footballer (born 2008)

Personal information
- Full name: Romário Fernandes Cunha
- Date of birth: 21 March 2008 (age 18)
- Place of birth: Ribeira de Pena, Portugal
- Position: Goalkeeper

Team information
- Current team: Braga

Youth career
- 2020–: Braga

International career^{‡}
Years	Team	Apps	(Gls)
2023	Portugal U15	2	(0)
2024	Portugal U16	2	(0)
2024–2025	Portugal U17	22	(0)
2025–	Portugal U18	3	(0)
Medal record
Men's football
Representing Portugal
FIFA U-17 World Cup
Winner	2025 Qatar
UEFA European Under-17 Championship
Winner	2025 Albania
- ‡ National team caps and goals as of 18:21, 28 November 2025 (UTC)

Romário Fernandes Cunha (born 21 March 2008) is a Portuguese footballer who plays as a goalkeeper for Braga.

== Club career ==
Born in Ribeira de Pena in Portugal, Cunha was trained by Braga, where he first distinguished himself in the youth teams with the Portuguese football club, signing his first professional contract there in March 2024.

== International career ==
Cunha was called up to the Portugal U17 in September 2024. He was named in Portugal U17's squad for the 2025 UEFA European Under-17 Championship.

Cunha distinguished himself from the group stages, before Portugal reached the final of the competition after winning on penalties against Italy (after a 2-2 draw). He performed three saves in the penalty shootout, and after having already saved a penalty in the game, Cunha was hailed as a hero by the national press, after eliminating the reigning champions.

The team then claimed the trophy by defeating France 3–0 in the final. Cunha was mentioned as among the most prominent players of the Portugal squad throughout the tournament.

== Honours ==
=== Portugal U17 ===
- FIFA U-17 World Cup: 2025
- UEFA European Under-17 Championship: 2025

=== Individual ===
- FIFA U-17 World Cup Golden Glove: 2025
- UEFA European Under-17 Championship Team of the Tournament: 2025
