= Tomás Soares =

Portuguese footballer (born 2008)

Personal information
- Full name: Tomás Alves Soares
- Date of birth: 19 January 2008 (age 18)
- Place of birth: Paços de Ferreira, Portugal
- Position: Forward

Team information
- Current team: Benfica

Youth career
- SC Freamunde
- 2016–: Benfica

International career^{‡}
Years	Team	Apps	(Gls)
2022–2023	Portugal U15	7	(5)
2023–2024	Portugal U16	6	(5)
2024–	Portugal U17	8	(7)
Medal record
Men's football
Representing Portugal
FIFA U-17 World Cup
Winner	2025 Qatar
UEFA European Under-17 Championship
Winner	2025 Albania
- ‡ National team caps and goals as of 31 May 2025

Tomás Alves Soares (born 19 January 2008) is a Portuguese professional footballer who plays as a forward for Benfica.

== Club career ==
Born in Paços de Ferreira, Soares is a youth product of SC Freamunde and Benfica.

In October 2024, he signed his first professional contract with Benfica.

== International career ==
Soares is a youth international for Portugal, having played for the under-15, under-16 and under-17.

In May 2025, he was called with Portugal for the European Under-17 Championship in Albania. He was a standout during his team's run to the final, coming on the field, scoring and assisting against Albania and Germany in the pool stage, and scoring again as a substitute in the semi-final against the Italian reining champions.

== Honours ==
Portugal U17

- FIFA U-17 World Cup: 2025
- UEFA European Under-17 Championship: 2025
