= 2025 UEFA European Under-17 Championship =

2025 UEFA Kampionati Evropian U-17

Tournament details
- Host country: Albania
- Dates: 19 May – 1 June
- Teams: 8 (from 1 confederation)
- Venues: 4 (in 4 host cities)

Final positions
- Champions: Portugal (7th title)
- Runners-up: France

Tournament statistics
- Matches played: 15
- Goals scored: 54 (3.6 per match)
- Attendance: 63,571 (4,238 per match)
- Top scorer(s): (Italy) Samuele Inácio (5 goals)
- Best player: (Portugal) Rafael Quintas

The 2025 UEFA European Under-17 Championship was the 22nd edition of the UEFA European Under-17 Championship (41st edition if the under-16 era is included), the annual international football competition contested by the men's under-17 national teams of the UEFA member associations. Albania was selected by UEFA on 26 September 2023 to host the final tournament, for the first time.

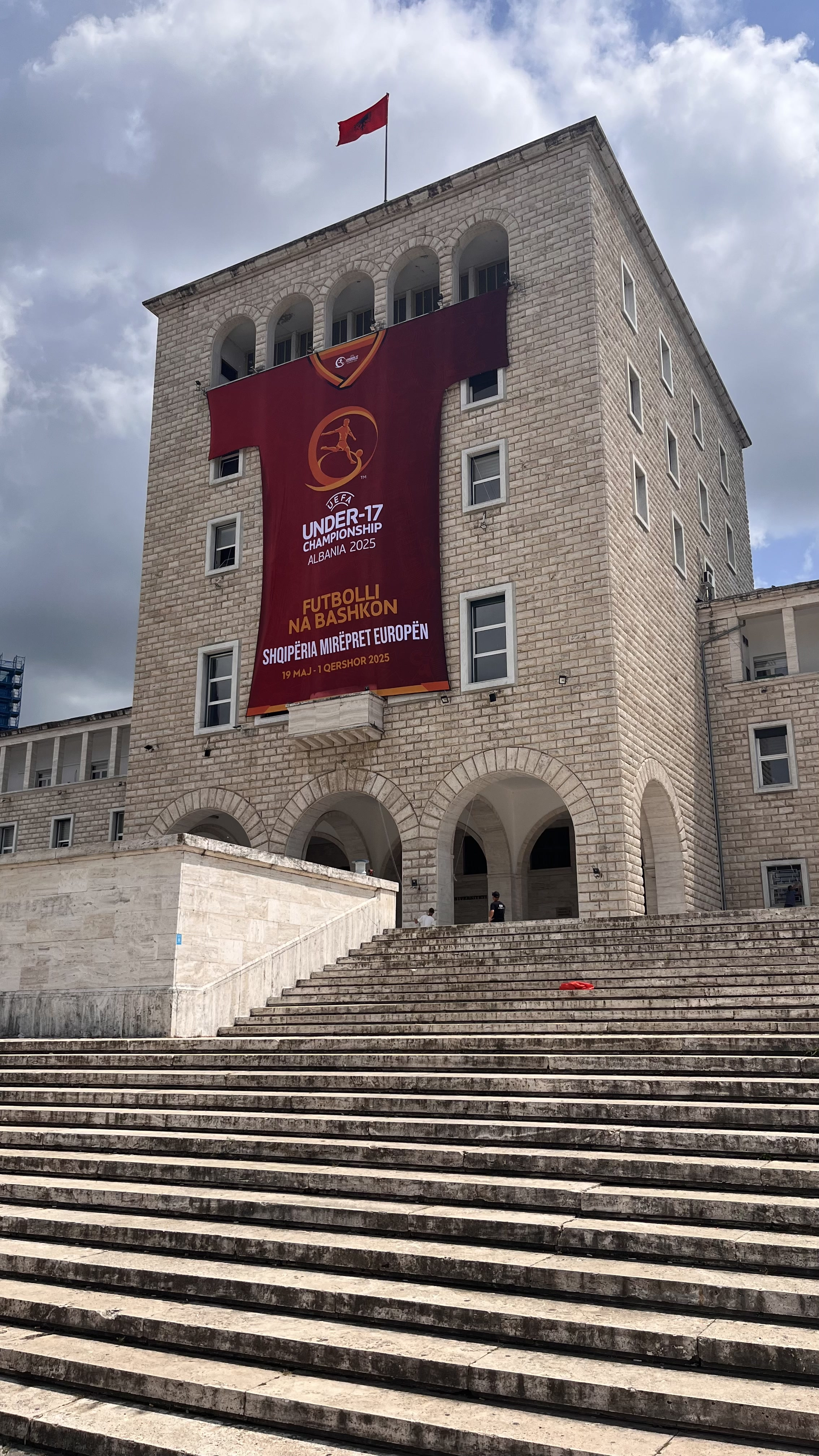
Promotion for the tournament in Tirana

A total of eight teams competed in the final tournament (reduced from 16 in previous editions), with players born on or after 1 January 2008 eligible to participate. Unlike previous editions held in odd-numbered years, the tournament qualification competition served as the UEFA qualifiers for the FIFA U-17 World Cup, while the final tournament no longer served as the UEFA qualifiers, with the top 11 teams qualifying for the 2025 FIFA U-17 World Cup in Qatar as the UEFA representatives, while the final tournament had only eight teams competed.

Portugal won the competition for the 7th time (3rd in the under-17 era) after defeating France 3–0 in the final.

== Qualification ==
=== Qualified teams ===
The following teams qualified for the final tournament.

Note: All appearance statistics include only U-17 era (since 2002).

Team	Method of qualification	Finals appearance	Last appearance	Previous best performance
Albania	Hosts	1st	Debut	
Italy	League A Group A1 winners	13th	2024 (Champions)	Champions (2024)
Germany	League A Group A2 winners	15th	2023 (Champions)	Champions (2009, 2023)
France	League A Group A3 winners	16th	2024 (Group stage)	Champions (2004, 2015, 2022)
Portugal	League A Group A4 winners	12th	2024 (Runners-up)	Champions (2003, 2016)
Czech Republic	League A Group A5 winners	8th	2024 (Quarter-finals)	Runners-up (2006)
Belgium	League A Group A6 winners	9th	2022 (Group stage)	Semi-finals (2007, 2015, 2018)
England	League A Group A7 winners	17th	2024 (Quarter-finals)	Champions (2010, 2014)

== Venues ==
The tournament will be hosted in 4 venues.

Durrës	Elbasan
Niko Dovana Stadium; Capacity: 12,040	Elbasan Arena; Capacity: 12,800
2025 UEFA European Under-17 Championship is located in Albania
Rrogozhinë	Tirana
Egnatia Arena; Capacity: 4,000	Arena Kombëtare; Capacity: 22,500

== Officials ==
A total of 6 referees and 6 assistant referees were selected by UEFA for the tournament.

Referee	Assistants
Patrik Kolarić (Croatia)	Luka Pajić (Croatia)
Mikkel Redder (Denmark)	Martin Markus (Denmark)
Oliver Reitala (Finland)	Olli Jantunen (Finland)
Joey Kooij (Netherlands)	Dyon Fikkert (Netherlands)
Łukasz Kuźma (Poland)	Marek Arys (Poland)
Oleksiy Derevinskyi (Ukraine)	Oleksiy Myronov (Ukraine)
	Christopher Rae (Scotland)
	Guillaume Maire (Switzerland)

== Group stage ==
The group winners and runners-up advanced to the semi-finals.

Tie-breaking criteria for group play
The ranking of teams in the group stage is determined as follows:
1. Points obtained in all group matches;
2. Points in head-to-head matches among tied teams;
3. Goal difference in head-to-head matches among tied teams;
4. Goals scored in head-to-head matches among tied teams;
5. If more than two teams are tied, and after applying all head-to-head criteria above, a subset of teams are still tied, all head-to-head criteria above are reapplied exclusively to this subset of teams;
6. Goal difference in all group matches;
7. Goals scored in all group matches;
8. Penalty shoot-out if only two teams have the same number of points, and they met in the last round of the group and are tied after applying all criteria above (not used if more than two teams have the same number of points, or if their rankings are not relevant for qualification for the next stage);
9. Disciplinary points
  - Yellow card: −1 point;
  - Indirect red card (second yellow card): −3 points;
  - Direct red card: −3 points;
10. UEFA coefficient for the qualifying round draw;
11. Drawing of lots.

=== Group A ===
Pos	Team	Pld	W	D	L	GF	GA	GD	Pts	Qualification
1	France	3	2	1	0	7	0	+7	7	Knockout stage
2	Portugal	3	2	1	0	6	1	+5	7	Knockout stage
3	Germany	3	1	0	2	5	5	0	3	
4	Albania (H)	3	0	0	3	0	12	−12	0	

Source: UEFA
Rules for classification: Group stage tiebreakers
(H) Hosts
19 May 2025
18:00

Albania	0−4	Portugal
	Report	Quintas 36'; Mide 68' (pen.); Cabral 82'; Soares 90+2'

Arena Kombëtare, Tirana
Attendance: 8,662
Referee: Patrik Kolarić (Croatia)
19 May 2025
20:30

Germany	0−3	France
	Report	Azizi 1'; N'Guessan 12'; Batola 78'

Elbasan Arena, Elbasan
Attendance: 4,400
Referee: Joey Kooij (Netherlands)

22 May 2025
18:00

Albania	0–4	Germany
	Report	Mensah 7'; Staff 20'; Mike 66'; Oteng-Mensah 85' (pen.)

Elbasan Arena, Elbasan
Attendance: 8,330
Referee: Kamal Umudlu (Azerbaijan)
22 May 2025
20:30

France	0−0	Portugal
	Report

Arena Kombëtare, Tirana
Attendance: 3,013
Referee: Lukasz Kuzma (Poland)

25 May 2025
20:30

France	4–0	Albania
Malonga 33'; Coulibaly 51'; N'Guessan 66', 79'	Report

Elbasan Arena, Elbasan
Attendance: 4,400
Referee: Oleksiy Derevinskyi (Ukraine)
25 May 2025
20:30

Portugal	2–1	Germany
Chelmik 76'; Banjaqui 89'	Report	Isbruch 72'

Arena Kombëtare, Tirana
Attendance: 2,723
Referee: Mikkel Redder (Denmark)

=== Group B ===
Pos	Team	Pld	W	D	L	GF	GA	GD	Pts	Qualification
1	Italy	3	3	0	0	8	4	+4	9	Knockout stage
2	Belgium	3	1	1	1	5	4	+1	4	Knockout stage
3	England	3	1	1	1	7	7	0	4	
4	Czech Republic	3	0	0	3	4	9	−5	0	

Source: UEFA
Rules for classification: Group stage tiebreakers
20 May 2025
18:00

England	1–1	Belgium
Rodriguez 12'	Report	Fernandez 49'

Egnatia Arena, Rrogozhinë
Attendance: 1,688
Referee: Lukasz Kuzma (Poland)
20 May 2025
20:30

Italy	2–1	Czech Republic
Inácio 38'; Arena 42'	Report	Srb 53'

Niko Dovana Stadium, Durrës
Attendance: 4,445
Referee: Oleksii Derevinskyi (Ukraine)

23 May 2025
18:00

Belgium	3–1	Czech Republic
Camara 24', 42'; Gielen 45'	Report	Čížek 65'

Niko Dovana Stadium, Durrës
Attendance: 2,950
Referee: Mikkel Redder (Denmark)
23 May 2025
20:30

Italy	4–2	England
Inácio 10' (pen.); De Paoli 37'; Campaniello 67'; Luongo 77'	Report	Rodriguez 23', 49'

Egnatia Arena, Rrogozhinë
Attendance: 3,074
Referee: Joey Kooij (Netherlands)

26 May 2025
20:30

Belgium	1–2	Italy
De Wannemacker 12'	Report	Inácio 62', 78' (pen.)

Niko Dovana Stadium, Durrës
Attendance: 3,900
Referee: Patrik Kolarić (Croatia)
26 May 2025
20:30

Czech Republic	2–4	England
Palaščák 59'; Sochůrek 89'	Report	Dowman 5'; Rodríguez 15'; Howell 37'; Gray 40'

Egnatia Arena, Rrogozhinë
Attendance: 1,513
Referee: Florian Lata (Albania)

== Knockout stage ==
In the knockout stage, a penalty shoot-out was used to decide the winner if necessary (no extra time was played).

=== Bracket ===
Semi-finals
29 May – Elbasan
France	3
Belgium	2
29 May – Tirana
Italy	2 (3)
Portugal (p)	2 (4)

Final
1 June – Tirana
France	0
Portugal	3

=== Semi-finals ===
29 May 2025
18:00

France	3–2	Belgium
A. Camara 42'; Matondo 50'; N'Guessan 54'	Report	N. Fernandez 45+2' (pen.); Wins 79'

Elbasan Arena, Elbasan
Attendance: 2,030
Referee: Mikkel Redder (Denmark)
29 May 2025
20:30

Italy	2−2	Portugal
Inácio 20'; Baralla 59'	Report	Stevan 28'; Soares 67'
Penalties
Comotto (penalty missed); Prisco (penalty scored); Giani (penalty scored); Inácio (penalty scored); Maccaroni (penalty missed); Iddrisa (penalty missed)	3–4	(penalty missed) Soares; (penalty scored) Pereira; (penalty scored) Neves; (penalty scored) Mide; (penalty missed) Dbouk; (penalty scored) Chelmik

Arena Kombëtare, Tirana
Attendance: 2,200
Referee: Joey Kooij (Netherlands)

=== Final ===
1 June 2025
20:30

France	0–3	Portugal
	Report	Cabral 30'; D. Cunha 38'; Neves 60'

Arena Kombëtare, Tirana
Attendance: 10,243
Referee: Oleksii Derevinskyi (Ukraine)

== Goalscorers ==
There were 54 goals scored in 15 matches, for an average of 3.6 goals per match.

5 goals

- (Italy) Samuele Inácio

4 goals

- (England) Alejandro Gomes Rodríguez
- (France) Djylian N'Guessan

2 goals

- (Belgium) Ali Camara
- (Belgium) Noah Fernandez
- (Portugal) Anísio Cabral
- (Portugal) Tomás Soares

1 goal

- (Belgium) August De Wannemacker
- (Belgium) Wout Gielen
- (Belgium) Axl Wins
- (Czech Republic) Kryštof Čížek
- (Czech Republic) Martin Palaščák
- (Czech Republic) Hugo Sochůrek
- (Czech Republic) Matouš Srb
- (England) Max Dowman
- (England) Harry Gray
- (England) Harry Howell
- (France) Ilyas Azizi
- (France) Christ Batola
- (France) Abdoulaye Camara
- (France) Djibril Coulibaly
- (France) Hermann Malonga
- (France) Rudy Matondo
- (Germany) Lasse Isbruch
- (Germany) Jeremiah Mensah
- (Germany) Wisdom Mike
- (Germany) Kenziah Oteng-Mensah
- (Germany) Alexander Staff
- (Italy) Antonio Arena
- (Italy) Alessio Baralla
- (Italy) Thomas Campaniello
- (Italy) Cristiano De Paoli
- (Italy) Andrea Luongo
- (Portugal) Daniel Banjaqui
- (Portugal) Martim Chelmik
- (Portugal) Duarte Cunha
- (Portugal) Stevan Manuel
- (Portugal) Mateus Mide
- (Portugal) Gil Neves
- (Portugal) Rafael Quintas

== Awards ==
The following awards were given after the conclusion of the tournament:

- Player of the Tournament: (Portugal) Rafael Quintas
- Top Scorer: (Italy) Samuele Inácio

=== Team of the Tournament ===
After the tournament, the Under-17 Team of the Tournament was selected by the UEFA Technical Observer panel.

Position	Player
Goalkeeper	(Portugal) Romário Cunha
Right Back	(Portugal) Daniel Banjaqui
Centre Back	(France) Emmanuel Mbemba
Centre Back	(Portugal) Mauro Furtado
Left Back	(France) Lucas Batbedat
Defensive Midfielder	(Belgium) Nathan De Cat
Defensive Midfielder	(Portugal) Rafael Quintas
Right Winger	(Portugal) Duarte Cunha
Attacking Midfielder	(Italy) Samuele Inácio
Left Winger	(Belgium) Jesse Bisiwu
Centre Forward	(France) Djylian N'Guessan
