= Stevan Manuel =

Portuguese footballer (born 2008)

Personal information
- Full name: Stevan Pedro Dores Manuel
- Date of birth: 11 June 2008 (age 18)
- Place of birth: Lisbon, Portugal
- Position: Attacking midfielder

Team information
- Current team: Benfica B
- Number: 81

Youth career
- 2016–2017: Alta
- 2017–: Benfica

Senior career*
Years	Team	Apps	(Gls)
2026–	Benfica B	2	(0)

International career^{‡}
2022–2023	Portugal U15	7	(1)
2023–2024	Portugal U16	8	(2)
2024–2025	Portugal U17	13	(2)
Medal record
Men's football
Representing Portugal
FIFA U-17 World Cup
Winner	2025 Qatar
UEFA European Under-17 Championship
Winner	2025 Albania
- * Club domestic league appearances and goals ‡ National team caps and goals as of 2 June 2025

Stevan Pedro Dores Manuel (born 11 June 2008), sometimes known as just Stevan, is a Portuguese professional footballer who plays as an attacking midfielder for Benfica B.

== Club career ==
Born in Lisbon, Manuel began his football career in 2016 in the youth team Alta. The following year, he transferred to Benfica, where first distinguished himself in the youth teams with this football club. In the summer of 2024, he signed his first professional contract with this club.

== International career ==
Manuel was first called up to Portugal U17 team in September 2024. He was named to that squad for the 2025 UEFA European Under-17 Championship. Portugal reached the final of the competition after winning on penalties against Italy (after a 2–2 draw). The team then claimed the trophy by defeating France 3–0 in the final.

In November 2025, Manuel was again included the largely unchanged U-17 squad that participated in the U-17 World Cup in Qatar. He made his mark from the very first match, a 6–1 victory against New Caledonia where he was named man of the match. Portugal triumphed over some of the biggest teams from their respective continents, including Morocco, Belgium, Mexico, Brazil, and finally Austria in the final, winning the U-17 World Cup for the first time. Their prolific attack combined for 23 goals, just three shy of Nigeria's record set in 2013.

== Personal life ==
Manuel is the nephew of Portuguese international Renato Sanches.

== Honours ==
Portugal U17

- FIFA U-17 World Cup: 2025
- UEFA European Under-17 Championship: 2025
