= Dauda Iddrisa =

Italian footballer

Iddrisa Dauda Amihere
Personal information
- Full name: Dauda Amihere Iddrisa
- Date of birth: 8 January 2008 (age 18)
- Place of birth: Brescia, Italy
- Height: 5 ft 11 in (1.80 m)
- Positions: Defensive midfielder; defender

Team information
- Current team: West Bromwich Albion
- Number: 35

Youth career
- –2016: Uso Inzino
- 2016–2019: Smethwick Rangers
- 2019–: West Bromwich Albion

Senior career*
Years	Team	Apps	(Gls)
2024–	West Bromwich Albion	0	(0)

International career^{‡}
2023	Italy U15	3	(0)
2024–2025	Italy U17	21	(1)
2025–	Italy U18	10	(1)
Medal record
Men's football
Representing Italy
FIFA U-17 World Cup
Third place	2025 Qatar
- * Club domestic league appearances and goals as of 21:30, 13 August 2024 (UTC) ‡ National team caps and goals as of 21:30, 31 March 2026 (UTC)

Iddrisa Dauda Amihere (born 8 January 2008) is an Italian professional footballer who plays as a defensive midfielder and defender for EFL Championship club West Bromwich Albion.

== Early life ==
Dauda Amihere was born in Brescia, Italy, and began playing football with local amateur club Uso Inzino, but later left the country and moved to England with his family in 2016, when he was eight years old.

== Career ==
In 2016, after leaving his birth nation and moving to England, he joined the youth academy of Smethwick Rangers, three years later joining the youth academy of West Bromwich Albion, in 2019.

On 13 August 2024, Dauda Amihere made his professional debut for West Bromwich Albion in the EFL Cup, appearing as a substitute in a 2–1 defeat to Fleetwood Town. On 27 February 2025, he signed his first professional contract with the club, penning a deal until 2027.

== International career ==
Dauda Amihere is eligible for England, Ghana and Italy. He has represented Italy at the under-15, under-17 and under-18 levels, with the U17 side he finished in third place at the 2025 FIFA U-17 World Cup.

== Career statistics ==
As of match played 13 August 2024

Appearances and goals by club, season and competition
Club	Season	League			FA Cup		EFL Cup		Other		Total	
Club	Season	Division	Apps	Goals	Apps	Goals	Apps	Goals	Apps	Goals	Apps	Goals
West Bromwich Albion	2024–25	Championship	0	0	0	0	1	0	—		1	0
West Bromwich Albion	2025–26	Championship	0	0	0	0	0	0	—		0	0
Career total			0	0	0	0	1	0	0	0	1	0

== Honours ==
Italy U17

- FIFA U-17 World Cup third place: 2025
