= 2024–25 FA Youth Cup =

English football tournament season

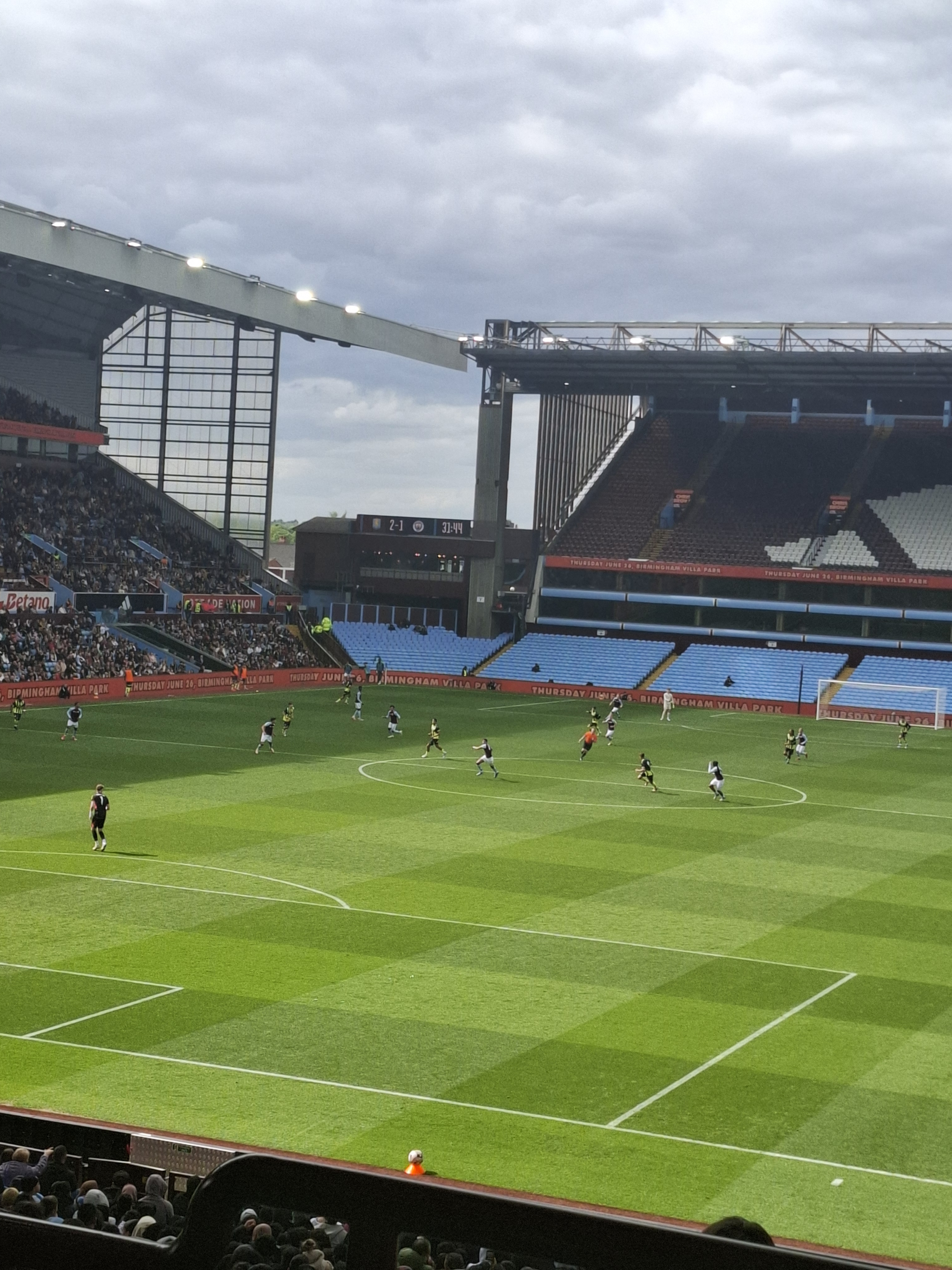
- 2025 FA Youth Cup Final at Villa Park

Tournament details
- Teams: 633

Final positions
- Champions: Aston Villa (5th Title)
- Runners-up: Manchester City (9th Runner Up Finish)

Tournament statistics
- Top goal scorer: (Denmark) Chido Obi-Martin Manchester United (7 Goals)

The 2024–25 FA Youth Cup was the 73rd edition of the competition.

The competition consisted of several rounds and was preceded by a qualifying competition, starting with two preliminary rounds which was followed by three qualifying rounds for non-League teams. The Football League teams entered the draw thereafter, with League One and League Two teams entered in the first round proper, and Premier League and Championship teams entered in the third round proper.

A record 633 clubs were accepted into the competition. Although 3 teams Hutton, Newent Town, and Thame United withdrew before the draw began, 630 competed in the competition. The current defending Champions are Manchester City who defeated Leeds United 4–0 at the City of Manchester Stadium in front of 20,000 fans.

== Calendar ==
Round	Matches played from	Matches	Clubs	New entries
Extra preliminary round	12 August 2024	93	630 → 537	186
Preliminary round	2 September 2024	191	537 → 346	289
First round qualifying	16 September 2024	117	346 → 229	43
Second round qualifying	30 September 2024	70	229 → 159	23
Third round qualifying	14 October 2024	35	159 → 124	
First round	2 November 2024	40	124 → 84	45
Second round	23 November 2024	20	84 → 64	
Third round	14 December 2024	32	64 → 32	44
Fourth round	18 January 2025	16	32 → 16	
Fifth round	8 February 2025	8	16 → 8	
Quarter-finals	8 March 2025	4	8 → 4	
Semi-finals	5 April 2025	2	4 → 2	
Final	3 May 2025	1	2 → 1	

== Qualifying rounds ==
=== Extra preliminary round ===
186 teams from tiers 7-10 competed in the Extra preliminary Round. 9 walkovers occurred in this round as Ardley United, Arundel, Godalming Town, Rochester United, St Blazey, Selsey, Soham Town Rangers, Sutton Athletic and West Didsbury & Chorlton all withdrew from the competition at this stage. The result is 9 total walkovers so far. The draw was released on 5 July 2024.

Tie	Home team (tier)	Score	Away team (tier)	Att.
Friday 9 August 2024
13	Emley AFC (8)	4–1	Gainsborough Trinity (7)	158
Monday 12 August 2024
8	West Didsbury & Chorlton (9)	W/O	Hyde United (7)	NA
23	Newcastle Town (8)	7–0	Stafford Rangers (8)	56
59	AFC Croydon Athletic (8)	W/O	Sutton Athletic (9)	NA
63	Rochester United (10)	W/O	Rusthall (9)	NA
76	Farnham Town (8)	W/O	Godalming Town (10)	NA
85	Gosport Borough (7)	12–0	United Services Portsmouth (9)	165
28	Lye Town (8)	5–0	Studley (9)	53
Match played at Studley.
42	Sawbridgeworth Town (9)	2–4	Saffron Walden Town (9)	
57	Hendon (7)	1–2	Hillingdon Borough (10)	69
73	Three Bridges (8)	3–2	Westfield (8)	68
Match played at Westfield.
77	Hastings United (7)	W/O	Arundel (10)	NA
78	Didcot Town (8)	3–1	Frimley Green (10)	71
88	Bristol Manor Farm (8)	3–2	Yate Town (8)	126
92	St Blazey (9)	W/O	Saltash United (9)	NA
22	Romulus (9)	1–2	Coton Green (10)	50
Match played at Coton Green.
25	Stratford Town (7)	3–2	Redditch United (7)	60
38	Brantham Athletic (9)	W/O	Soham Town Rangers (9)	NA
41	Haverhill Borough (10)	1–3	Haverhill Rovers (10)	
45	Hackney Wick (10)	3–0	Brentwood Town (8)	
51	Bowers & Pitsea (7)	4–3	London Lions (10)	
53	Berkhamsted (8)	4–2	Spelthorne Sports (9)	30
70	South Park (Reigate) (8)	2–1	Little Common (9)	52
75	Redhill (9)	1–4	Horsham YMCA (9)	85
Tuesday 13 August 2024
36	Lakenheath (9)	4–0	Swaffham Town (10)	
52	Rayners Lane (8)	2–1	Holmer Green (10)	
14	Guiseley AFC (7)	3–0	Dronfield Town (10)	123
34	St Ives Town (7)	6–1	Crawley Green (9)	83
48	Waltham Abbey (8)	1–7	Hashtag United (7)	124
55	Hanworth Villa (8)	1–0	Burnham (9)	78
69	Steyning Town Community (8)	1–3	Chipstead (9)	40
Wednesday 14 August 2024
10	FC United of Manchester (7)	2–0	Darwen (10)	188
61	Phoenix Sports (8)	1–5	Dartford (7)	103
79	Reading City (9)	4–3	Marlow (7)	85
21	Clifton All Whites (10)	4–1	Hinckley LR (8)	80
24	AFC Telford United (7)	3–1	Stourbridge (7)	72
Match played at Shifnal Town.
31	Kempston Rovers (9)	6–2	Letchworth Garden City Eagles (10)	150
54	Brook House (10)	2–3	Oxhey Jets (10)	88
67	Merstham (8)	5–1	Roffey (9)	137
74	Guildford City (9)	1–5	Newhaven (9)	50
89	Shortwood United (10)	0–5	Mangotsfield United (9)	
15	Gresley Rovers (9)	10–0	Lincoln United (9)	145
27	Halesowen Town (7)	1–2	Pershore Town (9)	107
43	Bishop's Stortford (7)	0–0 (3–1 p)	Potters Bar Town (7)	307
47	Frenford (9)	2–3	May & Baker Eastbrook Community (10)	66
50	Little Oakley (9)	0–5	Enfield Borough (10)	12
56	Wembley (9)	0–10	Northwood (8)	35

Tie	Home team (tier)	Score	Away team (tier)	Att.
60	Hollands & Blair (9)	2–1	Glebe (9)	
62	Sutton Common Rovers (8)	2–1	Sevenoaks Town (8)	54
68	Horsham (7)	2–2 (3–4 p)	Carshalton Athletic (7)	78
72	Bognor Regis Town (7)	1–2	Worthing United (10)	75
81	Fleet Town (9)	2–2 (3–4 p)	Hartley Wintney (8)	188
86	Bishop's Cleeve (8)	4–3	Odd Down (10)	
Thursday 15 August 2024
7	Ramsbottom United (9)	6–1	Colne (9)	70
9	Wythenshawe Town (8)	1–6	Warrington Rylands (7)	102
19	Loughborough Students (8)	1–2	Matlock Town (7)	96
30	Moulton (10)	0–1	Royston Town (7)	
58	Sheppey United (8)	2–3	Erith & Belvedere (9)	81
18	Leicester Nirvana (9)	0–2	Hinckley AFC (9)	72
32	Kettering Town (7)	2–4	Shefford Town & Campton (9)	
44	Hullbridge Sports (9)	3–2	West Essex (9)	
49	Walthamstow (8)	2–3	Barking (9)	
64	Mile Oak (10)	0–2	Walton & Hersham (8)	
87	Hengrove Athletic (10)	0–3	Fairford Town (9)	87
Match played at Fairford Town.
90	Thornbury Town (9)	1–3	Cheltenham Saracens (10)	107
91	Malmesbury Victoria (9)	0–11	Paulton Rovers (8)	
Match played at Paulton Rovers.
93	Falmouth Town AFC (8)	1–8	Helston Athletic (8)	
3	Workington AFC (7)	2–5	Whickham (9)	
4	Cheadle Heath Nomads (10)	1–2	South Liverpool (9)	
5	Skelmersdale United (10)	7–1	Sandbach United (10)	
Match played at Sandbach United.
11	Ossett United (8)	1–6	Golcar United (9)	119
12	Harrogate Railway Athletic (10)	0–1	Tadcaster Albion (9)	115
16	Holbeach United (10)	1–2	Ashby Ivanhoe (9)	
20	Sherwood Colliery (8)	6–1	Louth Town (10)	67
26	Coventry Sphinx (8)	5–0	Hereford Pegasus (9)	
29	Droitwich Spa (10)	1–5	Worcester City (8)	
33	March Town United (9)	0–12	Harpenden Town (9)	
35	AFC Rushden & Diamonds (8)	4–1	FC Peterborough (10)	84
37	Cambridge City (8)	2–1	Stowmarket Town (9)	55
Match played at Stowmarket Town.
39	Felixstowe & Walton United (8)	3–2	Great Yarmouth Town (9)	149
40	Woodbridge Town (9)	0–4	Ipswich Wanderers (8)	
65	Loxwood (9)	4–0	Ash United (10)	
82	Basingstoke Town (7)	W/O	Ardley United (9)	NA
84	Petersfield Town (9)	2–2 (2–4 p)	AFC Totton (7)	79
Friday 16 August 2024
2	Pickering Town (9)	0–2	Newcastle Benfield (9)	
6	Cheadle Town (9)	2–2 (5–6 p)	AFC Liverpool (9)	73
46	Fisher (9)	1–4	Wingate & Finchley (7)	148
1	Penrith AFC (9)	2–4	Whitby Town (7)	65
80	Wantage Town (10)	3–0	Abingdon United (10)	166
17	Ilkeston Town (7)	2–2 (3–4 p)	Quorn (9)	172
Match played at Quorn.
66	Kingstonian (8)	W/O	Selsey (10)	NA
Match played at South Park Reigate.
83	AFC Stoneham (9)	5–0	Fareham Town (9)	82
Sunday 18 August 2024
71	Pagham (9)	6–0	Saltdean United (9)	

=== Preliminary round ===
382 teams competed in the Preliminary round with the 93 winners from the previous round along with 289 new teams. 17 walkovers occurred in this round as Baldock Town, Barnstaple Town, Bideford, Carlisle City, Crowborough Athletic, Evesham United, Flackwell Heath, Great Wakering Rovers, Hamworthy United, Holmesdale, Lancing, Mousehole, Romford, Shepton Mallet, Silsden, Stapenhill, and Wick all withdrew from the competition at this stage. As a result, we have 26 walkovers so far. The draw was released on 5 July 2024.

Tie	Home team (tier)	Score	Away team (tier)	Att.
Monday 2 September 2024
4	Heaton Stannington (8)	W/O	Carlisle City (9)	NA
27	Pontefract Collieries (8)	2–0	Sheffield (8)	181
32	Basford United (7)	3–3 (3–1 p)	Lutterworth Athletic (10)	50
36	Sherwood Colliery (8)	W/O	Stapenhill (10)	NA
101	May & Baker Eastbrook Community (10)	W/O	Great Wakering Rovers (9)	NA
117	Flackwell Heath (8)	W/O	Amersham Town (9)	NA
123	Holmesdale (9)	W/O	Deal Town (8)	NA
133	Haywards Heath Town (9)	W/O	Wick (9)	NA
148	Loxwood (9)	W/O	Crowborough Athletic (9)	NA
163	Gosport Borough (7)	7–1	AFC Totton (7)	161
170	Swindon Supermarine (7)	W/O	Hamworthy United (10)	NA
176	Shepton Mallet (9)	W/O	Longwell Green (10)	NA
188	Barnstaple Town (9)	W/O	AFC St. Austell (9)	NA
191	Brixham (9)	W/O	Bideford (8)	NA
20	Ashton Town (10)	6–1	Runcorn Linnets (8)	128
38	Coalville Town (10)	2–2 (5–4 p)	Hinckley AFC (9)	
44	Saffron Dynamo (10)	2–4	Anstey Nomads (8)	
54	Stourport Swifts (9)	1–3	Bedworth United (8)	59
67	Cranfield United (10)	1–2	AFC Dunstable (8)	135
110	Southall (8)	2–2 (3–1 p)	Penn & Tylers Green (10)	70
143	Bexhill United (9)	1–6	Pagham (9)	38
151	Horsham YMCA (9)	6–1	AFC Uckfield Town (10)	
159	Easington Sports (9)	2–4	Reading City (9)	86
167	Wimborne Town (7)	4–0	AFC Portchester (9)	
178	Bristol Manor Farm (8)	7–1	Lydney Town (9)	
183	Longlevens (9)	2–2 (4–5 p)	Hallen (10)	101
3	Chester-le-Street United (10)	5–1	Newcastle Benfield (9)	125
45	Stamford (7)	2–1	Ashby Ivanhoe (9)	
48	Paget Rangers (10)	0–10	Coton Green (10)	
Match played at Coton Green.
49	Bilston Town (10)	W/O	Evesham United (8)	NA
50	Rugby Borough (9)	1–3	Lichfield City (9)	74
53	AFC Brifgnorth (10)	P–P	Worcester Raiders (9)	
55	Worcester City (8)	4–4 (4–5 p)	Coventry Copsewood (10)	63
57	Malvern Town (8)	1–1 (8–9 p)	Brocton (9)	
60	Tividale (9)	0–6	Wolverhampton Casuals (9)	44
68	Desborough Town (10)	2–3	Corby Town (8)	159
74	Huntingdon Town (10)	4–2	Newport Pagnell Town (9)	51
82	Bury Town (8)	4–0	Mulbarton Wanderers (9)	106
91	Colney Heath (9)	3–1	Bishop's Stortford (7)	
98	FC Clacton (9)	0–6	Redbridge (8)	69
106	Berkhamsted (8)	2–4	Oxhey Jets (10)	60
115	Bedfont Sports (9)	3–3 (8–7 p)	Hanworth Villa (8)	81
127	Herne Bay (8)	2–2 (3–5 p)	Dartford (7)	93
132	Hastings United (7)	3–0	Newhaven (9)	97
136	Whitehawk (7)	1–1 (5–4 p)	Chipstead (9)	47
147	Carshalton Athletic (7)	0–3	Walton & Hersham (8)	
150	South Park (Reigate) (8)	3–3 (3–4 p)	Badshot Lea (8)	77
152	Camberley Town (9)	6–0	Eversley & California (10)	74
156	Thatcham Town (8)	5–2	Wallingford & Crowmarsh (9)	127
165	Alton (9)	0–0 (2–4 p)	Portland United (9)	
Tuesday 3 September 2024
5	Consett (8)	0–11	Stockton Town (7)	
6	Morpeth Town (7)	5–0	Whitby Town (7)	83
109	Harrow Borough (8)	1–2	Rayners Lane (8)	63
137	Cobham (9)	0–3	Abbey Rangers (9)	
175	Oldland Abbotonians (9)	2–0	Welton Rovers (9)	50
184	Clevedon Town (9)	1–3	Street (9)	57
186	Portishead Town (9)	1–4	Fairford Town (9)	
Match played at Hallen.
187	Callington Town (10)	3–1	Elburton Villa (10)	184
189	Saltash United (9)	3–1	Bishops Lydeard (10)	93
14	Vauxhall Motors (8)	4–1	Ramsbottom United (9)	
26	Grimsby Borough (8)	5–1	Retford (10)	85
47	Sutton Coldfield Town (8)	0–0 (3–4 p)	Chasetown (8)	
66	St. Ives Town (7)	4–1	Royston Town (7)	83
72	Harpenden Town (9)	W/O	Baldock Town (9)	NA
80	Framlingham Town (10)	4–1	Lakenheath (9)	
84	Newmarket Town (8)	5–1	Gorleston (8)	29
85	Leiston (7)	4–2	Hadleigh United (9)	54
130	Chichester City (7)	1–1 (5–4 p)	Worthing United (10)	
134	Tooting Bec (10)	2–0	Eastbourne Town (8)	
155	Ascot United (8)	0–10	Bracknell Town (7)	59
161	Sandhurst Town (9)	2–0	Yateley United (10)	63
168	Sholing (7)	0–2	Brockenhurst (9)	
Wednesday 4 September 2024
12	Warrington Rylands (7)	5–1	Nantwich Town (8)	94
185	Bridgwater United (9)	8–1	Cribbs (8)	
18	Atherton Collieries (8)	2–2 (4–5 p)	Stockport Georgians (10)	
22	Emley AFC (8)	1–1 (4–5 p)	Tadcaster Albion (9)	185
97	Cheshunt (7)	0–3	Hertford Town (8)	
99	Wingate & Finchley (7)	W/O	Romford (9)	NA
111	Edgware & Kingsbury (9)	3–4	Chalfont St. Peter (10)	32
126	Sittingbourne (8)	0–1	Ramsgate (8)	70
142	Peacehaven & Telscombe (9)	2–3	Colliers Wood United (10)	
144	Jersey Bulls (9)	4–1	Metropolitan Police (8)	36
Match played at Crawley Down Gatwick.
182	Frome Town (7)	0–10	Brislington (9)	
8	Avro (8)	3–3 (4–5 p)	Wythenshawe (8)	147
11	FC United of Manchester (7)	3–4	Atherton Laburnum Rovers (10)	
16	South Liverpool (9)	3–2	Congleton Town (8)	
24	Handsworth (9)	7–1	Cleethorpes Town (8)	
25	Goole (9)	2–5	Staveley Miners Welfare (10)	112
Match played at Staveley Miners Welfare.
34	Kirby Muxloe (10)	7–0	Kimberley Miners Welfare (9)	67
51	Lye Town (8)	1–1 (8–7 p)	AFC Telford United (7)	
61	Walsall Wood (8)	0–6	AFC Wulfrunians (9)	
69	Hitchin Town (7)	2–5	Dunstable Town (9)	92
70	Arlesey Town (9)	8–0	Wellingborough Town (8)	51
79	Ipswich Wanderers (8)	6–2	Ely City (9)	
81	Lowestoft Town (7)	6–2	Wroxham (8)	
87	Thetford Town (9)	0–12	Diss Town (10)	
89	Witham Town (8)	1–13	Bowers & Pitsea (7)	
92	Grays Athletic (8)	1–4	Hackney Wick (10)	
94	Ware (8)	12–1	St. Margaretsbury (10)	144
108	Northwood (8)	2–2 (4–3 p)	Kings Langley (8)	81
112	Uxbridge (8)	1–2	Tring Athletic (9)	114
120	Sutton Common Rovers (8)	6–1	Balham (9)	23
122	Stansfeld (9)	6–2	Folkestone Invicta (7)	

Tie	Home team (tier)	Score	Away team (tier)	Att.
145	Farnham Town (8)	0–7	Merstham (8)	
153	Risborough Rangers (9)	1–2	Wokingham Town (9)	62
154	Clanfield 85 (10)	3–1	Windsor & Eton (10)	62
157	Banbury United (7)	1–2	Basingstoke Town (7)	50
181	Bishop's Cleeve (8)	2–0	Bristol Telephones (10)	
35	Clifton All Whites (10)	1–2	Harborough Town (7)	
37	Quorn (9)	2–0	Heather St John's (10)	146
Thursday 5 September 2024
2	Blyth Spartans (7)	4–2	Hebburn Town (7)	102
21	Ashton United (7)	0–2	Skelmersdale United (10)	
121	Punjab United (9)	1–9	Erith & Belvedere (9)	41
169	Bournemouth (9)	P–P	Winchester City (7)	
1	Billingham Town (10)	1–3	Whickham (9)	
149	Eastbourne United (9)	2–1	East Grinstead Town (8)	
Match played at East Grinstead Town.
7	Newcastle Blue Star (9)	3–3 (5–3 p)	Boro Rangers (9)	
30	Stocksbridge Park Steels (8)	2–2 (1–2 p)	Bradford (Park Avenue) (8)	125
59	Atherstone Town (9)	0–2	Racing Club Warwick (8)	56
62	Leighton Town (8)	6–3	St. Neots Town (9)	104
64	Ampthill Town (10)	4–2	Godmanchester Rovers (9)	
75	Histon (9)	9–0	Rothwell Corinthians (10)	84
76	Shefford Town & Campton (9)	9–1	Biggleswade Town (7)	116
93	Stanway Rovers (9)	1–1 (4–3 p)	Ilford (9)	
95	Buckhurst Hill (9)	4–3	Woodford Town (9)	132
96	Hullbridge Sports (9)	0–1	Heybridge Swifts (8)	
107	Hanwell Town (7)	0–2	Hillingdon Borough (10)	
118	AFC Croydon Athletic (8)	0–2	Hollands & Blair (9)	
125	Erith Town (8)	2–1	Cray Wanderers (7)	105
139	Westside (10)	2–3	Three Bridges (8)	21
140	Lewes (7)	P–P	Kingstonian (8)	
160	Binfield (8)	1–3	Didcot Town (8)	
162	Aylesbury Vale Dynamos (9)	5–2	Wantage Town (10)	95
174	Cheltenham Saracens (10)	P–P	Cinderford Town (8)	
177	Paulton Rovers (8)	P–P	Cirencester Town (9)	
179	Hartpury University (9)	4–0	Mangotsfield United (9)	94
180	Slimbridge (9)	3–2	Gloucester City (7)	106
190	Mousehole (8)	P–P	Helston Athletic (8)	
15	Squires Gate (9)	3–0	Stalybridge Celtic (8)	84
19	Burscough (9)	2–8	Irlam (9)	65
23	Garforth Town (8)	1–8	Bottesford Town (9)	
39	Leicester St. Andrews (10)	0–3	Aylestone Park (9)	
40	Gresley Rovers (9)	4–3	Long Eaton United (8)	150
41	Grantham Town (8)	1–5	Blackstones (10)	60
42	GNG Oadby Town (9)	1–2	Birstall United (10)	50
43	Deeping Rangers (9)	0–5	Eastwood CFC (9)	
46	Coventry Sphinx (8)	2–3	Nuneaton Griff (10)	
52	Stratford Town (7)	0–2	Newcastle Town (8)	
58	Pershore Town (9)	1–0	Boldmere St. Michaels (8)	70
63	Buckingham (10)	0–4	Bugbrooke St. Michaels (9)	87
65	Daventry Town (9)	0–1	AFC Rushden & Diamonds (8)	80
73	Wellingborough Whitworth (10)	7–0	Raunds Town (10)	55
77	Cambridge City (8)	1–1 (3–4 p)	Brantham Athletic (9)	62
Match played at Brantham Athletic.
78	Cornard United (9)	1–2	Haverhill Rovers (10)	
83	Walsham-le-Willows (9)	3–3 (4–5 p)	Dereham Town (9)	49
88	Sheringham (9)	1–0	Fakenham Town (9)	
90	Concord Rangers (8)	1–2	Barking (9)	
102	Saffron Walden Town (9)	1–8	Haringey Borough (8)	
103	Takeley (9)	5–1	Cockfosters (9)	
104	Enfield Borough (10)	6–2	Tilbury (8)	
105	FC Baresi (10)	0–3	Billericay Town (7)	
113	Leverstock Green (8)	1–5	Beaconsfield Town (8)	74
138	Corinthian Casuals (9)	P–P	Shoreham (9)	
141	Chessington & Hook United (10)	0–2	Leatherhead (8)	119
158	North Leigh (8)	5–2	Hartley Wintney (8)	
164	Millbrook (9)	2–8	Poole Town (7)	
171	Folland Sports (10)	P–P	Hamble Club (9)	
173	Radstock Town (10)	P–P	Tuffley Rovers (9)	
86	AFC Sudbury (7)	3–0	Felixstowe & Walton United (8)	124
166	Moneyfields (8)	4–0	Christchurch (9)	175
Friday 6 September 2024
29	Yorkshire Amateur (10)	0–7	Guiseley AFC (7)	
33	Matlock Town (7)	3–2	Mickleover (7)	
71	Winslow United (9)	0–3	Kempston Rovers (9)	120
114	Rising Ballers Kensington (10)	2–0	Hayes & Yeading United (8)	
131	Broadbridge Heath (8)	P–P	Burgess Hill Town (8)	
146	Lancing (8)	W/O	Tooting & Mitcham United (9)	NA
9	Hyde United (7)	2–2 (1–3 p)	Macclesfield (7)	221
10	Lancaster City (7)	2–2 (5–6 p)	Trafford (8)	101
56	Alvechurch (7)	2–2 (2–4 p)	Allscott Heath (10)	
100	Hashtag United (7)	1–2	Barkingside (10)	147
116	Langley (10)	4–1	Hilltop (9)	
119	Margate (8)	1–2	Rusthall (9)	102
124	Whitstable Town (9)	1–1 (4–1 p)	Lewisham Borough (10)	
128	Faversham Town (9)	2–1	Ashford United (8)	154
135	Knaphill (9)	0–8	AFC Whyteleafe (9)	
Match played at AFC Whyteleafe.
172	AFC Stoneham (9)	2–2 (3–5 p)	Havant & Waterlooville (7)	82
13	AFC Liverpool (9)	2–1	Clitheroe (8)	121
Saturday 7 September 2024
31	Golcar United (9)	2–3	Brighouse Town (8)	
Sunday 8 September 2024
17	Pilkington (9)	5–0	Bootle (8)	
28	Penistone Church (9)	W/O	Silsden (9)	NA
169	Bournemouth (9)	P–P	Winchester City (7)	
Monday 9 September 2024
53	AFC Brifgnorth (10)	0–4	Worcester Raiders (9)	
Tuesday 10 September 2024
169	Bournemouth (9)	0–5	Winchester City (7)	25
129	Dover Athletic (7)	2–3	Chatham Town (7)	125
140	Lewes (7)	0–2	Kingstonian (8)	
Wednesday 11 September 2024
190	Mousehole (8)	W/O	Helston Athletic (8)	NA
Thursday 12 September 2024
131	Broadbridge Heath (8)	0–10	Burgess Hill Town (8)	
174	Cheltenham Saracens (10)	2–3	Cinderford Town (8)	
177	Paulton Rovers (8)	1–3	Cirencester Town (9)	
138	Corinthian Casuals (9)	0–1	Shoreham (9)	
171	Folland Sports (10)	0–3	Hamble Club (9)	
173	Radstock Town (10)	5–0	Tuffley Rovers (9)	

=== First Round Qualifying ===
43 clubs from the sixth tier National League North and National League South competed with the 191 winners from the preliminary round. Even though the 6th tier has 48 teams, Chesham United, Farnborough, Peterborough Sports, Scunthorpe United, and Welling United did not apply to compete in the FA Youth Cup this year. Bracknell Town were originally supposed to play in this round, but were disqualified after they fielded an ineligible player so their opponent Ascot United moved on in their place. No walkovers occurred during the round. This results in the same number of walkovers for the tournament, 26. The draw was made on 6 September 2024.

Tie	Home team (tier)	Score	Away team (tier)	Att.
Thursday 12 September 2024
73	Tring Athletic (9)	7–0	Chalfont St Peter AFC (10)	
Monday 16 September 2024
1	South Shields (6)	2–0	Stockton Town (7)	220
80	Dartford (7)	3–3 (4–5 p)	Erith Town (8)	205
115	Callington Town (10)	3–3 (6–7 p)	Bridgwater United (9)	206
45	Kempston Rovers (9)	2–0	Ampthill Town (10)	
46	Brackley Town (6)	0–17	Wellingborough Whitworth (10)	130
67	Southall (8)	2–1	Northwood (8)	46
69	Oxhey Jets (10)	1–4	Hemel Hempstead Town (6)	
75	Erith & Belvedere (9)	1–7	Chatham Town (7)	186
99	Didcot Town (8)	4–3	Sandhurst Town (9)	132
108	Longwell Green Sports (10)	1–2	Hallen (10)	
113	Torquay United (6)	2–0	Saltash United (9)	127
Match played at Buckland Athletic.
3	Chester-Le-Street United (10)	1–0	Whickham (9)	162
9	Curzon Ashton (6)	5–0	Chorley (6)	148
20	Tadcaster Albion (9)	1–0	Pontefract Collieries (8)	230
23	Basford United (7)	A-A	Corby Town (8)	62
32	Lichfield City (9)	2–1	Rushall Olympic (6)	
35	Coton Green (10)	0–6	Kidderminster Harriers (6)	
44	St Ives Town (7)	5–4	Huntingdon Town (10)	174
56	Colney Heath (9)	4–0	Enfield Borough (10)	88
74	Tonbridge Angels (6)	1–2	Hastings United (7)	
87	Whitehawk (7)	4–1	Three Bridges (8)	79
91	Kingstonian (8)	4–2	Abbey Rangers (9)	66
105	Weston Super Mare (6)	0–0 (2–4 p)	Street (9)	96
Tuesday 17 September 2024
11	Warrington Town (6)	6–0	Radcliffe (6)	107
7	Atherton Laburnum Rovers (10)	1–2	AFC Liverpool (9)	83
68	Amersham Town (9)	2–4	Langley (10)	
95	Basingstoke Town (7)	2–0	Oxford City (6)	100
117	Helston Athletic (8)	6–1	Weymouth (6)	78
16	Vauxhall Motors (8)	1–2	Southport (6)	
40	AFC Wulfrunians (9)	4–2	Bedworth United (8)	
49	Sheringham (9)	5–1	Diss Town (10)	
58	Bowers & Pitsea (7)	3–0	Takeley (9)	
61	Chelmsford City (6)	1–5	Harpenden Town (9)	
Match played at Harpenden Town.
70	Rayners Lane (8)	2–3	Bedfont Sports (9)	
71	Beaconsfield Town (8)	4–1	Hillingdon Borough (10)	
78	Whitstable Town (9)	0–2	Stansfeld (9)	
83	Chichester City (7)	2–3	Eastbourne United (9)	519
101	Salisbury (6)	1–1 (5–6 p)	Brockenhurst (9)	72
102	Wimborne Town (7)	1–1 (4–3 p)	Portland United (9)	
Wednesday 18 September 2024
10	Warrington Rylands (7)	1–5	Macclesfield (7)	
12	Skelmersdale United (10)	0–2	Irlam (9)	140
14	Wythenshawe (8)	5–2	Ashton Town (10)	187
34	Nuneaton Griff (10)	2–1	Wolverhampton Casuals (9)	
59	May & Baker Eastbrook Community (10)	0–2	Haringey Borough (8)	
62	Enfield Town (6)	2–5	St Albans City (6)	112
64	Buckhurst Hill (9)	0–1	Hackney Wick (10)	101
82	Hampton & Richmond Borough (6)	3–4	Badshot Lea (8)	85
89	Tooting Bec (10)	6–0	Haywards Heath Town (9)	
92	Merstham (8)	17–0	Pagham (9)	186
2	Darlington (6)	2–3	Heaton Stannington (8)	
Match played at Northallerton Town.
6	Chester (6)	1–0	South Liverpool (9)	272
18	Grimsby Borough (8)	7–0	Scarborough Athletic (6)	75
27	Aylestone Park (9)	4–1	Quorn (8)	
29	Birstall United (10)	0–7	Gresley Rovers (9)	
30	Harborough Town (7)	2–1	Kirby Muxloe (10)	
31	Leamington (6)	4–0	Allscott Heath (10)	
36	Brocton (9)	2–0	Pershore Town (9)	106
38	Hereford (6)	0–1	Lye Town (8)	88
48	Lowestoft Town (7)	3–0	Ipswich Wanderers (8)	202
52	Newmarket Town (8)	1–6	Haverhill Rovers (10)	105
53	King's Lynn Town (6)	2–0	Leiston (7)	121

Tie	Home team (tier)	Score	Away team (tier)	Att.
66	Heybridge Swifts (8)	3–2	Wingate & Finchley (7)	63
79	Faversham Town (9)	0–3	Maidstone United (6)	145
81	Sutton Common Rovers (8)	1–0	Rusthall (9)	48
107	Chippenham Town (6)	0–2	Hartpury University (9)	
110	Bishop's Cleeve (8)	0–2	Bath City (6)	
Thursday 19 September 2024
22	Guiseley AFC (7)	7–1	Brighouse Town (8)	134
63	Boreham Wood (6)	1–3	Hertford Town (8)	229
100	Gosport Borough (7)	3–2	Winchester City (7)	124
4	Newcastle Blue Star (9)	1–5	Blyth Spartans (7)	
57	Stanway Rovers (9)	5–0	Hornchurch (6)	
60	Barking (9)	4–0	Ware (8)	164
84	Shoreham (9)	0–5	Eastbourne Borough (6)	
90	Worthing (6)	3–1	Colliers Wood United (10)	
Match played at Colliers Wood United.
109	Cirencester Town (9)	2–0	Oldland Abbotonians (9)	62
111	Slimbridge AFC (9)	3–2	Bristol Manor Farm (8)	132
114	Truro City (6)	10–0	AFC St Austell (9)	204
116	Brixham (9)	1–4	Fairford Town (9)	77
15	Squires Gate (9)	1–3	Buxton (6)	86
19	Penistone Church (9)	3–2	Staveley Miners Welfare (10)	115
21	Bottesford Town (9)	1–3	Farsley Celtic (6)	145
24	Sherwood Colliery (8)	9–1	Anstey Nomads (8)	74
26	Coalville Town (10)	4–0	Stamford AFC (7)	
33	Coventry Copsewood (10)	0–1	Bilston Town (10)	
37	Worcester Raiders (9)	0–2	Chasetown (8)	
41	AFC Dunstable (8)	4–1	AFC Rushden & Diamonds (8)	
43	Bugbrooke St Michaels (9)	3–3 (4–2 p)	Leighton Town (8)	77
47	Arlesey Town (9)	0–1	Dunstable Town (9)	
50	Brantham Athletic (9)	0–3	Needham Market (6)	
51	Framlingham Town (10)	0–7	AFC Sudbury (7)	
54	Dereham Town (9)	1–1 (3–4 p)	Bury Town (8)	
76	Hollands & Blair (9)	0–4	Ramsgate (8)	
77	Deal Town (8)	3–8	Burgess Hill Town (8)	108
88	Dorking Wanderers (6)	9–0	Horsham YMCA (9)	175
93	Leatherhead (8)	1–4	Jersey Bulls (9)	
97	Wokingham & Emmbrook (9)	3–3 (3–4 p)	North Leigh (8)	56
98	Clanfield 85 (10)	0–4	Camberley Town (9)	53
104	Hamble Club (9)	1–2	Poole Town (7)	
106	Cinderford Town (8)	0–3	Brislington (9)	
112	Radstock Town (10)	1–2	Swindon Supermarine (7)	44
Friday 20 September 2024
5	Morpeth Town (7)	1–2	Spennymoor Town (6)	91
42	Shefford Town & Campton (9)	0–4	Histon (9)	
55	Aveley (6)	1–2	Billericay Town (7)	
8	Marine (6)	0–3	Trafford (8)	163
17	Handsworth (9)	5–2	Bradford (Park Avenue) (8)	118
25	Matlock Town (7)	1–4	Blackstones (10)	143
39	Racing Club Warwick (8)	2–3	Newcastle Town (8)	
65	Barkingside (10)	3–3 (6–7 p)	Redbridge (8)	
72	Slough Town (6)	1–2	Rising Ballers Kensington (10)	
96	Reading City (9)	4–0	Thatcham Town (10)	122
28	Eastwood Community (9)	2–0	Alfreton Town (6)	
94	Ascot United (8)	2–1	Aylesbury Vale Dynamos (9)	53
103	Havant & Waterlooville (7)	6–1	Moneyfields (8)	
Sunday 22 September 2024
85	AFC Whyteleafe (9)	5–0	Loxwood (9)	
86	Tooting & Mitcham United (9)	0–5	Walton & Hersham (7)	
13	Pilkington (9)	1–3	Stockport Georgians (10)	
Monday 23 September 2024
23	Basford United (7)	P–P	Corby Town (8)	
Match played at Corby Town.
Monday 30 September 2024
23	Basford United (7)	P–P	Corby Town (8)	
Match played at Corby Town.
Thursday 3 October 2024
23	Basford United (7)	3–1	Corby Town (8)	
Match played at Corby Town.

=== Second Round Qualifying ===
23 clubs from the fifth tier National League competed with the 117 winners from the previous round. 12 teams from tier ten are left with 11 confirmed to be moving on to this round. Although the fifth tier has 24 clubs, Braintree Town did not apply to compete in the FA Youth Cup. No walkovers occcured during the round. This results in the same number of walkovers for the tournament 26. The draw was done on 20 September 2024.

Tie	Home team (tier)	Score	Away team (tier)	Att.
Monday 30 September 2024
46	Ramsgate (8)	3–0	Ebbsfleet United (5)	273
3	South Shields (6)	4–1	Tadcaster Albion (9)	205
65	Hallen (10)	3–4	Forest Green Rovers (5)	
70	Torquay United (6)	4–1	Truro City (6)	136
Match played at Buckland Athletic.
19	Blackstones (10)	P–P	Coalville Town (10)	
22	Lichfield City (9)	1–1 (4–3 p)	Chasetown (8)	107
26	Bilston Town Community (10)	0–3	Solihull Moors (5)	
27	St Ives Town (7)	2–3	Kempston Rovers (9)	127
35	Bowers & Pitsea (7)	0–3	Barking (9)	
41	Bedfont Sports Club (9)	0–3	Beaconsfield Town (8)	87
45	Hastings United (7)	P–P	Stansfeld (9)	
55	Walton & Hersham (7)	1–3	Sutton United (5)	
56	Southall (8)	1–3	Kingstonian (8)	90
Tuesday 1 October 2024
11	Curzon Ashton (6)	2–3	AFC Fylde (5)	155
29	Histon (9)	P–P	Bugbrooke St Michaels (9)	
42	Hemel Hempstead Town (6)	1–6	Rising Ballers Kensington (10)	136
43	St Albans City (6)	6–2	Langley (10)	183
69	Helston Athletic (8)	1–4	Yeovil Town (5)	117
37	Southend United (5)	1–2	Harpenden Town (9)	207
51	Worthing (6)	0–2	Whitehawk (7)	104
53	Eastbourne Borough (6)	0–2	Woking (5)	80
67	Cirencester Town (9)	3–2	Slimbridge (9)	82
Wednesday 2 October 2024
1	Hartlepool United (5)	0–5	Blyth Spartans (7)	
2	Heaton Stannington (8)	0–4	Gateshead (5)	202
10	Rochdale (5)	4–0	Buxton (6)	
14	Guiseley AFC (7)	2–1	York City (5)	272
4	Chester-Le-Street United (10)	3–3 (3–5 p)	Spennymoor Town (6)	192
25	Nuneaton Griff (10)	2–4	Brocton (9)	
52	Aldershot Town (5)	1–1 (5–4 p)	Dorking Wanderers (6)	
64	Street (9)	2–1	Bath City (6)	
5	Chester (6)	1–0	Irlam (9)	222
6	Southport (6)	3–3 (3–4 p)	Trafford (8)	
38	Heybridge Swifts (8)	4–0	Haringey Borough (8)	93
40	Wealdstone (5)	3–4	Maidenhead United (5)	
54	Sutton Common Rovers (8)	0–3	Merstham (8)	98
17	Eastwood Community (9)	1–2	Gresley Rovers (9)	
Thursday 3 October 2024
7	Stockport Georgians (10)	0–2	Macclesfield (7)	98
12	FC Halifax Town (5)	6–2	Wythenshawe (8)	127
Match played at Wythenshawe.

Tie	Home team (tier)	Score	Away team (tier)	Att.
62	Gosport Borough (7)	2–1	Basingstoke Town (7)	87
28	Dunstable Town (9)	1–1 (2–4 p)	AFC Dunstable (8)	173
29	Histon (9)	4–2	Bugbrooke St Michaels (9)	
48	Burgess Hill Town (8)	1–0	Maidstone United (6)	122
13	Penistone Church (9)	0–7	Farsley Celtic (6)	
16	Sherwood Colliery (8)	1–5	Boston United (5)	
18	Aylestone Park (9)	2–0	Harborough Town (7)	167
21	Newcastle Town (8)	3–2	Kidderminster Harriers (6)	77
23	Leamington (6)	P–P	AFC Wulfrunians (9)	
30	Sheringham (9)	5–0	King's Lynn Town (6)	
32	Needham Market (6)	4–2	Stanway Rovers (9)	45
33	Haverhill Rovers (10)	2–3	Bury Town (8)	
44	Tring Athletic (9)	2–1	Barnet (5)	
47	Chatham Town (7)	0–2	Erith Town (8)	
57	Camberley Town (9)	7–1	Didcot Town (8)	58
60	Badshot Lea (8)	5–1	Havant & Waterlooville (7)	
31	AFC Sudbury (7)	2–0	Lowestoft Town (7)	181
Friday 4 October 2024
61	Brockenhurst (9)	2–3	Eastleigh (5)	242
68	Bridgwater United (9)	2–1	Fairford Town (9)	110
49	Eastbourne United (9)	1–0	Tooting Bec (10)	
Match played at Tooting Bec.
58	Hartpury University (9)	8–1	Ascot United (8)	64
63	Wimborne Town (7)	1–0	Poole Town (7)	198
66	Brislington (9)	2–0	Swindon Supermarine (7)	
8	Altrincham (5)	2–1	Warrington Town (6)	368
15	Handsworth (9)	4–2	Grimsby Borough (8)	
36	Billericay Town (7)	1–0	Redbridge (8)	103
39	Hackney Wick (10)	5–0	Dagenham & Redbridge (5)	
59	Reading City (9)	2–0	North Leigh (8)	194
9	AFC Liverpool (9)	2–2 (2–4 p)	Oldham Athletic (5)	187
24	Tamworth (5)	5–2	Lye Town (8)	183
34	Hertford Town (8)	6–0	Colney Heath (9)	220
Sunday 6 October 2024
50	Jersey Bulls (9)	3–2	AFC Whyteleafe (9)	40
Match played at AFC Whyteleafe.
Monday 7 October 2024
23	Leamington (6)	1–2	AFC Wulfrunians (9)	64
45	Hastings United (7)	0–4	Stansfeld (9)	
Thursday 10 October 2024
20	Wellingborough Whitworth (10)	4–2	Basford United (7)	
19	Blackstones (10)	2–2 (4–5 p)	Coalville Town (10)	

=== Third Round Qualifying ===
The 70 winners from the Second Round Qualifying compete in this round with the 35 winners progressing to the First Round Proper. Four teams Coalville Town, Hackney Wick, Rising Ballers Kensington, and Wellingborough Whitworth from tier 10 are the lowest ranked teams left in the competition. Seven teams Barking, Guiseley AFC, Gosport Borough, Hackney Wick, Harpenden Town, Kingstonian, and Newcastle Town made it from the Extra Preliminary Round to this round so far. The draw was done on 4 October 2024.

Tie	Home team (tier)	Score	Away team (tier)	Att.
Monday 14 October 2024
3	Oldham Athletic (5)	2–1	South Shields (6)	203
4	Gateshead (5)	2–3	Trafford (8)	
Match played at Dunston UTS.
30	Wimborne Town (7)	2–4	Torquay United (6)	
33	Bridgwater United (9)	2–1	Yeovil Town (5)	144
8	AFC Wulfrunians (9)	0–1	Lichfield City (9)	
14	Billericay Town (7)	0–1	Kempston Rovers (9)	55
21	Whitehawk (7)	2–1	Kingstonian (8)	
29	Brislington (9)	P–P	Camberley Town (9)	
Tuesday 15 October 2024
1	Rochdale (5)	1–1 (6–7 p)	Blyth Spartans (7)	
5	FC Halifax Town (5)	0–1	Farsley Celtic (6)	301
31	Forest Green Rovers (5)	3–0	Reading City (9)	84
35	Street (9)	1–2	Eastleigh (5)	
28	Eastbourne United (9)	P–P	Maidenhead United (5)	
Wednesday 16 October 2024
7	Altrincham (5)	1–0	Chester (6)	274
17	AFC Dunstable (8)	2–0	Needham Market (6)	
9	Coalville Town (10)	2–1	Brocton (9)	153
11	Boston United (5)	0–2	Solihull Moors (5)	228
18	Heybridge Swifts (8)	A–A	Hackney Wick (10)	
20	Hertford Town (8)	3–0	AFC Sudbury (7)	170
24	Stansfeld (9)	0–5	Sutton United (5)	
26	Beaconsfield Town (8)	0–1	Merstham (8)	

Tie	Home team (tier)	Score	Away team (tier)	Att.
Thursday 17 October 2024
6	Spennymoor Town (6)	0–2	AFC Fylde (5)	203
25	Burgess Hill Town (8)	2–1	Erith Town (8)	181
32	Hartpury University (9)	9–2	Gosport Borough (7)	163
10	Newcastle Town (8)	5–0	Gresley Rovers (9)	116
13	Aylestone Park (9)	0–3	Tamworth (5)	
16	Barking (9)	5–2	Histon (9)	451
27	Tring Athletic (9)	1–1 (4–5 p)	Aldershot Town (5)	
34	Badshot Lea (8)	4–0	Cirencester Town (9)	
12	Wellingborough Whitworth (10)	1–0	Handsworth (9)	80
Friday 18 October 2024
2	Macclesfield (7)	0–3	Guiseley AFC (7)	323
23	Ramsgate (8)	0–4	Woking (5)	421
15	Bury Town (8)	2–3	St Albans City (6)	197
Sunday 20 October 2024
22	Rising Ballers Kensington (10)	6–1	Jersey Bulls (9)	
Match played at AFC Whyteleafe.
19	Sheringham (9)	2–0	Harpenden Town (9)	
Match played at The Nest.
Wednesday 23 October 2024
18	Heybridge Swifts (8)	3–3 (3–4 p)	Hackney Wick (10)	
28	Eastbourne United (9)	0–3	Maidenhead United (5)	
Match played at Maidenhead United.
Thursday 24 October 2024
29	Brislington (9)	1–2	Camberley Town (9)	

== Competition Proper ==
=== First Round ===
45 teams from League One and League Two joined the 35 winners from the previous round. Barrow, Crawley Town, and Wycombe Wanderers will not participate in this round as they did not apply to enter the competition. Coalville Town, Hackney Wick, Rising Ballers Kensington and Wellingborough Whitworth from the tenth tier are the lowest ranked teams left in the competition. Five teams, Barking, Guiseley, Hackney Wick, Merstham FC and Newcastle Town made it all the way from the Extra Preliminary Round to the First Round Proper playing 5 games to make it here. The draw was made on 18 October 2024.

Number of teams per tier still in competition
Premier League (Note: Premier League and Championship teams will join the competition in the third round.)	Championship	League One	League Two	Non-League	Total
20 / 20	24 / 24	22 / 22	23 / 23	35 / 35	124 / 124

24 October 2024	Exeter City (3)	2–0	Bridgwater United (9)	Exeter
19:00 GMT	45' (o.g.); Oakes 55'	Report		Stadium: St James Park; Attendance: 269; Referee: Luke McFarlane

24 October 2024	Hartpury University (9)	1–3	Cheltenham Town (4)	Hartpury
19:30 GMT	Reid 72'		King 9'; Tustin 25'; Obieri 86'	Stadium: Hartpury Stadium; Attendance: 406; Referee: Mitchell Terry

25 October 2024	Hertford Town (8)	3–2	Cambridge United (3)	Hertford
19:00 GMT	O'Brien 14' (pen.); Cunningham 57'; McGregor 78'		Efobi 7'; Gray 29'	Stadium: Hertingfordbury Park; Attendance: 357; Referee: Joanne Horwood

28 October 2024	Oldham Athletic (5)	0–6	Barnsley (3)	Oldham
19:00 GMT		Report	Warburton 15'; Graham 26', 36'; Kay 45+3'; Afuape 50', 74'	Stadium: Boundary Park; Attendance: 251; Referee: Christopher Porter

28 October 2024	AFC Fylde (5)	3–0	Doncaster Rovers (4)	Wesham
19:00 GMT	Holder 32' (pen.), 71'; Mariani 90+5'			Stadium: Mill Farm; Attendance: 352; Referee: Andy Sykes

28 October 2024	Salford City (4)	2–1	Huddersfield Town (3)	Salford
19:00 GMT	Wright 50'; Butt 90+4'		Idemudia 18'	Stadium: Peninsula Stadium; Attendance: 547; Referee: Abdul Hakimy

28 October 2024	Lichfield City (9)	0–5	Lincoln City (3)	Lichfield
19:00 GMT			Wifa 8', 45+3', 55'; Okoro 60'; Okewoye 89'	Stadium: Trade Tyre Community Stadium; Attendance: 185; Referee: Keir Sheppard

28 October 2024	Gillingham (4)	4–3 (a.e.t.)	Charlton Athletic (3)	Gillingham
19:00 GMT	Webster 8'; Kot 49'; Sargent 70'; Walker 110'	Report	Fullah 44' (pen.); Reid 45+1'; Mwamba 78'	Stadium: MEMS Priestfield Stadium; Attendance: 348; Referee: Deryll David

29 October 2024	Rotherham United (3)	2–6	Bolton Wanderers (3)	Rotherham
19:00 GMT	Clarke 2' (pen.); Lee 73'		Abimbola 10', 34'; Smith 28'; Lewis 35'; Rice 53'; Thomas 90+1'	Stadium: AESSEAL New York Stadium; Attendance: 330; Referee: Ian Johnston

29 October 2024	Wrexham (3)	1–0 (a.e.t.)	Morecambe (4)	Wrexham
19:00 GMT	Kelly 120'	Report		Stadium: STōK Cae Ras; Attendance: 577; Referee: Thomas Swift

29 October 2024	Harrogate Town (4)	2–0	Guiseley (7)	Harrogate
19:00 GMT	Bray 27', 41'			Stadium: Exercise Stadium; Attendance: 727; Referee: Conor Ledgeway

29 October 2024	Chesterfield (4)	1–0 (a.e.t.)	Walsall (4)	Alfreton
19:00 GMT	Pucci 119'	Report		Stadium: Impact Arena; Attendance: 160; Referee: Samuel Wright

29 October 2024	Colchester United (4)	4–2	Hackney Wick (10)	Colchester
19:00 GMT	Sasere 13', 44'; Drysdale 34'; Moore 64'		Caselli 55', 75'	Stadium: JobServe Community Stadium; Attendance: 232; Referee: Sam Wigington

29 October 2024	Swindon Town (4)	3–1	Newport County (4)	Swindon
19:00 GMT	McCormick 13'; Obodo 73'; Ameen 75'	Report	Alexander-Walker 47'	Stadium: The County Ground; Attendance: 451; Referee: Adam Gregory

29 October 2024	Woking (5)	2–4 (a.e.t.)	Bromley (4)	Woking
19:45 GMT	Boxall 34', 70'		Evans 15', 85', 99'; Mann 118'	Stadium: The Laithwaite Community Stadium; Attendance: 166; Referee: Dennis Torres-Miranda

30 October 2024	Peterborough United (3)	1–2	Northampton Town (3)	Peterborough
19:00 GMT	Sykut 46'	Report	Rayfield 7'; Dobson 21'	Stadium: Weston Homes Stadium; Attendance: 550; Referee: Joseph Karram

30 October 2024	Kempston Rovers (9)	1–2	Notts County (4)	Kempston
19:30 GMT	Conceicao 22'		Hazard 19'; Emmanuel 84'	Stadium: Hillgrounds Leisure; Attendance: 150; Referee: Luke Scott

30 October 2024	AFC Dunstable (8)	2–1	Reading (3)	Dunstable
19:30 GMT	Skelton-Squires 75' (pen.); Long-Nichols 83'		Jones 52'	Stadium: Creasey Park; Attendance: 350; Referee: Zachary Cunningham

30 October 2024	Sutton United (5)	0–1	AFC Wimbledon (4)	Sutton
19:45 GMT			Hedges 45+1'	Stadium: VBS Community Stadium; Attendance: 497; Referee: Derrick Laing

30 October 2024	Leyton Orient (3)	1–0	Aldershot Town (5)	Leyton
19:45 GMT	Carter 38'	Report		Stadium: Gaughan Group Stadium; Attendance: 261; Referee: Ross Murph
Note: Match was originally supposed to start at 19:00 GMT but was moved 45 minutes later because Aldershot town did not arrive yet.

30 October 2024	Merstham (8)	4–0	St Albans City (6)	Merstham
20:00 GMT	Perkins 49', 50'; Lutonadio 67'; Solecki 81'	Report		Stadium: The Hybrid Fitness Stadium; Attendance: 287; Referee: Craig Barnett
Note: Match was pushed back 15 minutes due to traffic on the M25.

31 October 2024	Altrincham (5)	1–4 (a.e.t.)	Carlisle United (4)	Altrincham
19:00 GMT	Jarrald 77'		O'Donoghue 90+2'; Lambert 93'; Hopper 98'; Rigby 102'	Stadium: The J.Davidson Stadium; Attendance: 313; Referee: Graeme Kearney

31 October 2024	Newcastle Town (8)	2–4	Birmingham City (3)	Newcastle-under-Lyme
19:45 GMT	Darlington 20'; Jones 52'		Bateman 59', 84'; Briscoe 68'; Betteka 90'	Stadium: Red Industries Stadium; Attendance: 226; Referee: Brandon Scaife

31 October 2024	Barking (9)	2–3	Whitehawk (7)	Dagenham
19:45 GMT	Ukonu 58'; Sanni 59'		Sha 19', 41'; Quaye 79'	Stadium: Lawtech Stadium; Attendance: 167; Referee: Gerry Heron

31 October 2024	Sheringham (9)	0–1	Rising Ballers Kensington (10)	Sheringham
19:45 GMT			Kelly 44'	Stadium: Weybourne Road; Attendance: 110; Referee: Jaden Lister

31 October 2024	Camberley Town (9)	0–2	Forest Green Rovers (5)	Camberley
19:45 GMT			Aldridge 60'; Hughes 70'	Stadium: Krooner Park; Attendance: 115; Referee: Dennis Torres-Miranda

31 October 2024	Tamworth (5)	2–1	Wellingborough Whitworth (10)	Tamworth
20:00 GMT	Bailey 21'; Wyse 49'		Joseph 90+3'	Stadium: The Lamb Ground; Attendance: 127; Referee: Mitchell Cartwright

1 November 2024	Accrington Stanley (4)	2–1	Farsley Celtic (6)	Accrington
19:00 GMT	Popoola 34'; Hanson 63'		Priestley-Standing 39'	Stadium: Wham Stadium; Attendance: 314; Referee: Mark Reeves

1 November 2024	Stockport County (3)	0–3	Blackpool (3)	Stockport
19:00 GMT		Report	Schluter 9', 65'; Bondo 77'	Stadium: Stockport Sports Village; Attendance: 206; Referee: Adam Watson

1 November 2024	Blyth Spartans (7)	1–1 (a.e.t.) (3–5 p)	Bradford City (4)	Blyth
19:00 GMT	Parker 90'	Report	Brooks 48'	Stadium: Croft Park; Attendance: 341; Referee: Givi Todua
	Penalties
	Ndiwendi (penalty missed); Nioto (penalty scored); Burke (penalty missed); Kinniburgh (penalty scored); Parker (penalty scored)		(penalty scored) Denison; (penalty scored) Thompson; (penalty scored) Murray; (penalty scored) Gaitley; (penalty scored) Boney

1 November 2024	Fleetwood Town (4)	4–1	Wigan Athletic (3)	Fleetwood
19:00 GMT	Roberts 43'; Lane 64'; McLean 74'; Taylor 81'		Bettoni 19'	Stadium: Highbury Stadium; Attendance: 296; Referee: Christopher Porter

1 November 2024	Mansfield Town (3)	1–2	Grimsby Town (4)	Mansfield
19:00 GMT	Whitman-Brown 27'		Brown 47'; Storr 90+4'	Stadium: One Call Stadium; Attendance: 474; Referee: Ashley Allen

3 November 2024	Trafford (8)	0–1	Tranmere Rovers (4)	Flixton
13:00 GMT			Henderson 7'	Stadium: Shawe View Stadium; Attendance: 246; Referee: Jack Lambert

4 November 2024	Milton Keynes Dons (4)	0–4	Stevenage (3)	Denbigh
19:00 GMT			Doherty 34'; Salik 46'; Norris 56'; Brown 88'	Stadium: Stadium MK; Attendance: 350; Referee: Luke Scott

4 November 2024	Eastleigh (5)	5–2	Torquay United (6)	Eastleigh
19:00 GMT	Jones 21' (pen.), 90+2'; Stone 52', 90+5'; Tarley 88'	Report	Mubiru 7' (o.g.); Herbert 54'	Stadium: Silverlake Stadium; Attendance: 221; Referee: Paul Barber

5 November 2024	Port Vale (4)	0–4	Burton Albion (3)	Burslem
19:00 GMT			Svarc 30'; Newall 46'; Thistleton 85'; Willow 90+4'	Stadium: Vale Park; Attendance: 435; Referee: Thomas Swift

5 November 2024	Bristol Rovers (3)	3–1 (a.e.t.)	Badshot Lea (8)	Bristol
19:00 GMT	Cadette 16', 93' (pen.); Cole 112'		Greenwood 83' (pen.)	Stadium: Memorial Stadium; Attendance: 257; Referee: Craig Scriven

5 November 2024	Solihull Moors (5)	1–2	Crewe Alexandra (4)	Solihull
19:45 GMT	Fielding 59'		Hodkin 5', 83'	Stadium: ARMCO Arena; Attendance: 249; Referee: Gareth Davis

6 November 2024	Shrewsbury Town (3)	9–0	Coalville Town (10)	Shrewsbury
19:30 GMT	Loughran 9', 12'; Whitney 28', 46', 64' (pen.); Hughes 32'; Nyamwanza 40'; England 49'; Gray 83'	Report		Stadium: The Croud Meadow; Attendance: 250; Referee: Jamie Conde

7 November 2024	Maidenhead United (5)	2–2 (a.e.t.) (2–3 p)	Burgess Hill Town (8)	Maidenhead
19:45 GMT	Pashaj 8' (pen.), 90+5'		Farrell 40' (pen.); Theodore 55'	Stadium: York Road; Attendance: 138; Referee: Joanne Horwood

13 November 2024 Replay	Bradford City (4)	1–1 (a.e.t.) (8–9 p)	Blyth Spartans (7)	Brighouse
19:00 GMT	Murray 41'		Daley 62'	Stadium: The Heffernan Utilities Stadium; Attendance: 139; Referee: Givi Todua
	Penalties
	Denison (penalty missed); Mboma (penalty scored); Murray (penalty scored); Rotimi (penalty scored); Boney (penalty scored); Goodman (penalty missed); Gaitley (penalty scored); Hall (penalty missed); Parr (penalty scored); Robinson (penalty scored); Denison (penalty scored); Mboma (penalty missed)		(penalty scored) Ndiwendi; (penalty scored) Burke; (penalty scored) Simpson; (penalty scored) Unwin; (penalty missed) Kinniburgh; (penalty missed) Brunton; (penalty scored) Youens; (penalty missed) Parker; (penalty scored) Urwin; (penalty scored) Campbell; (penalty scored) Ndiweni; (penalty scored) Burke
Note: Match was replayed at Brighouse Town because Bradford City used too many substitutes during the original Matchup.

20 November 2024 Replay	Bromley (4)	1–2 (a.e.t.)	Woking (5)	Bromley
19:45 GMT	Przybylo 50'		Rees 1' (o.g.); Akinwalere 113'	Stadium: Hayes Lane; Attendance: 166
Note: Match was ordered to be replayed because the initial match not being completed within the rules of the competition.

=== Second Round ===
The winners from the first round would compete in this round. Rising Ballers Kensington from the tenth tier is the lowest tier team left in the tournament. Merstham FC are the only team remaining who played in the Extra-Preliminary round, winning 6 matches to get to this stage. The draw was made on November 1, 2024.

Number of teams per tier still in competition
Premier League (Note: Premier League and Championship teams will join the competition in the third round.)	Championship	League One	League Two	Non-League	Total
20 / 20	24 / 24	13 / 22	15 / 23	12 / 35	84 / 124

13 November 2024	Barnsley (3)	0–1	Carlisle United (4)	Barnsley
19:00 GMT			Lambert 51'	Stadium: Oakwell; Attendance: 177; Referee: Paul Roots

13 November 2024	Tranmere Rovers (4)	1–3	Wrexham (3)	Birkenhead
19:00 GMT	Salvatore 19'		Hazeldine 43'; Roberts 57', 59'	Stadium: Prenton Park; Attendance: 562; Referee: Andy Sykes

15 November 2024	AFC Fylde (5)	3–3 (a.e.t.) (4–3 p)	Northampton Town (3)	Wesham
19:00 GMT	McKay 20'; Holder 30' (pen.); Mohammed 114'		Jevterevs 8'; Finlay 64'; Obiagwu 105'	Stadium: Mill Farm; Attendance: 517; Referee: Abid Hussain
	Penalties
	Holder (penalty scored); Hailwood (penalty scored); Mohammed (penalty scored); Mariani (penalty missed); Clark (penalty scored)		(penalty scored) Dobson; (penalty missed) Evans; (penalty scored) Rayfield; (penalty scored) Finlay; (penalty missed) Guess

15 November 2024	Fleetwood Town (4)	7–0	Tamworth (5)	Fleetwood
19:00 GMT	Cirino 20'; Smith 30'; Wilkes 43'; Roberts 62'; Wilkinson 63'; Taylor 69'; Kendrick 81'			Stadium: Highbury Stadium; Attendance: 266; Referee: Jacob Viera

15 November 2024	Grimsby Town (4)	3–2	Salford City (4)	Cleethorpes
19:00 GMT	Brown 11'; Rennardson 50'; Axcell 68'		Wright 21'; Padovani 85'	Stadium: Blundell Park; Attendance: 320; Referee: Mathew Wright

16 November 2024	Burton Albion (3)	1–2	Notts County (4)	Burton Upon Trent
14:00 GMT	Newall 38'		Denman 50', 84'	Stadium: Pirelli Stadium; Attendance: 420; Referee: Richard Morris

18 November 2024	Chesterfield (4)	2–2 (a.e.t.) (4–2 p)	Shrewsbury Town (3)	Alfreton
19:00 GMT	Elliott 80'; Pawson 94' (pen.)		Hughes 67'; Thompson-Mckenzie 120'	Stadium: Impact Arena; Attendance: 150; Referee: Ashley Royston
	Penalties
	Wainmain (penalty scored); Pucci (penalty scored); Stringer (penalty scored); White (penalty scored)		(penalty scored) Lewis; (penalty scored) Snook; (penalty missed) Starkey-Jones; (penalty missed) Loughran

18 November 2024	Eastleigh (5)	0–6	AFC Wimbledon (4)	Eastleigh
19:00 GMT		Report	McKenzie 10'; Kirby 13'; Moore 39'; Leach 41', 70'; Horan 60'	Stadium: Silverlake Stadium; Attendance: 250; Referee: Michael Ryan

18 November 2024	Stevenage (3)	4–1 (a.e.t.)	Cheltenham Town (4)	Stevenage
19:00 GMT	Brown 34', 108'; Cadman 109', 112'	Report	King 90+6'	Stadium: Lamex Stadium; Attendance: 516; Referee: Craig Barnett

19 November 2024	Harrogate Town (4)	3–1	Birmingham City (3)	Harrogate
19:00 GMT	McClarin 20'; Bray 40'; Gregory 81'		Bateman 60'	Stadium: Exercise Stadium; Attendance: 471; Referee: Jamie Cann

19 November 2024	Leyton Orient (3)	6–0	Whitehawk (7)	Leyton
19:00 GMT	Hambury 22'; Carter 38'; Samuel 43', 71'; Mohamud 51'; Hajdini 68' (pen.)			Stadium: Gaughan Group Stadium; Attendance: 210; Referee: Dennis Torres-Miranda

19 November 2024	Gillingham (4)	1–2	Swindon Town (4)	Gillingham
19:00 GMT	Orpwood 25'	Report	Ameen 12'; Alston 54'	Stadium: MEMS Priestfield Stadium; Attendance: 404; Referee: Gerry Heron

19 November 2024	Exeter City (3)	4–0	AFC Dunstable (8)	Exeter
19:00 GMT	Appleton 13'; Graham 34', 62'; Bellotti 76'	Report		Stadium: St James Park; Attendance: 192; Referee: Luke McFarlane

25 November 2024	Bolton Wanderers (3)	2–3	Lincoln City (3)	Horwich
19:00 GMT	Irwin 31'; Lawrence 86'	Report	Wifa 24', 55'; Oliver 90'	Stadium: Toughsheet Community Stadium; Attendance: 463; Referee: Graeme Kearney

26 November 2024	Accrington Stanley (4)	6–1	Blyth Spartans (7)	Accrington
19:00 GMT	Popoola 3', 45'; Hanson 25'; Sohna 45+10'; Osamuyimen 56'; Kemp 90+5'		Da Silva 29'	Stadium: Wham Stadium; Attendance: 240
Note: match was originally to be played on 20 November 2024, but was moved back a week because Blyth Spartans had to replay their first round matchup against Bradford City.

26 November 2024	Hertford Town (8)	4–3 (a.e.t.)	Bristol Rovers (3)	Hertford
19:00 GMT	Lynch 40', 45+2'; O’Brien 66'; Devshi 120+3'		Hill 9'; Moggeridge 31'; Carr 83'	Stadium: Hertingfordbury Park; Attendance: 559; Referee: Neil Morrison

27 November 2024	Crewe Alexandra (4)	2–0	Blackpool (3)	Crewe
19:00 GMT	Collins 3' (pen.); Moore 24'			Stadium: Mornflake Stadium; Attendance: 300; Referee: Richard Abson

27 November 2024	Burgess Hill Town (8)	2–2 (a.e.t.) (5–4 p)	Colchester United (4)	Burgess Hill
19:30 GMT	King 45+7'; Lawson 89'		Emery 27'; Drysdale 35'	Stadium: Leylands Park; Attendance: 443; Referee: Jonathan Bolland

27 November 2024	Merstham (8)	3–0	Forest Green Rovers (5)	Merstham
19:30 GMT	Mafu 59'; Cartwright 61'; Lutonadio 90+3'			Stadium: The Hybrid Fitness Stadium; Attendance: 363; Referee: Jordan Crossley

29 November 2024	Woking (5)	3–2 (a.e.t.)	Rising Ballers Kensington (10)	Sandhurst
19:45 GMT	Pask 94'; Page			Stadium: Bottom Meadow; Attendance: 83; Referee: Lawrence Torz-Brown
Note: Match was postponed due to a replay in the Bromley vs Woking match as the original game wasn't played within the rules of the competition. Then was postponed again due to a waterlogged pitch. Match was played at Sandhurst Town.

=== Third Round ===
44 teams from the EFL Championship and the Premier League join in this stage of the competition. Burgess Hill Town, Hertford Town, and Merstham from the 8th Tier are the lowest ranked teams remaining in the competition. Merstham are the only team remaining who played in the Extra-Preliminary round, winning 7 matches to get to this stage. The draw was made on 15 November 2024.

Number of teams per tier still in competition
Premier League (Note: Premier League and Championship teams will join the competition in the third round.)	Championship	League One	League Two	Non-League	Total
20 / 20	24 / 24	5 / 22	10 / 23	5 / 35	64 / 124

29 November 2024	Millwall (2)	2–2 (a.e.t.) (5–4 p)	Hull City (2)	Bermondsey
19:00 GMT	Beaumont 40'; Mansor 120'		Durkan 90+6'; 104' (o.g.)	Stadium: The Den; Attendance: 570; Referee: Michael Scott
	Penalties
	Whitby (penalty scored); Beaumont (penalty scored); Mansor (penalty scored); Beckwith (penalty scored); Thomas-Smith (penalty scored)		(penalty scored) Durkan; (penalty scored) Perry; (penalty missed) Ashbee; (penalty scored) Carter; (penalty scored) Ocaya

1 December 2024	Notts County (4)	0–4	Fulham	Nottingham
12:30 GMT		Report	Wingate 7', 53', 74'; Zepa 14'	Stadium: Meadow Lane; Attendance: 673 or 580; Referee: Joshua Drake

3 December 2024	Hertford Town (8)	3–4	Arsenal	Hertford
19:00 GMT	O'Brien 23'; Lynch 54' (pen.); Devshi 83'		Harriman-Annous 7'; Casey 40', 64'; Copley 43'	Stadium: Hertingfordbury Park; Attendance: 1,500; Referee: Stuart Smith

4 December 2024	Watford (2)	2–1	Oxford United (2)	King's Langley
19:00 GMT	Nabizada 29'; Odiase 60'		Lee 57' (pen.)	Stadium: The Orbital Fasteners Stadium; Attendance: 319; Referee: Adam Steele

6 December 2024	Aston Villa	6–0	Accrington Stanley (4)	Bodymoor Heath
19:00 GMT	Broggio 22', 55'; Cotcher 34'; Fortes 43'; Hemmings 80'; Lynch 90+1'			Stadium: Bodymoor Heath Training Ground; Attendance: 311; Referee: Joshua Williams

6 December 2024	Grimsby Town (4)	1–0	West Ham United	Cleethorpes
19:00 GMT	Giles 39'			Stadium: Blundell Park; Attendance: 592; Referee: Luke Watson

6 December 2024	Preston North End (2)	4–1	Liverpool	Preston
19:00 GMT	Rodríguez-Gentile 10'; Wilson 25'; Mawene 38'; Gairns 61'		Ewing 83'	Stadium: Deepdale; Attendance: 667; Referee: Jack Lambert

6 December 2024	Manchester City	1–0	Crystal Palace	Manchester
19:00 GMT	Batty 82'			Stadium: Joie Stadium; Attendance: 400; Referee: Thomas Swift

8 December 2024	Tottenham Hotspur	3–2	Middlesbrough (2)	Enfield
12:00 GMT	Elliott-Parris 45'; Olusesi 56'; Thompson 80' (pen.)		Coulson 20'; Cartwright 63'	Stadium: Tottenham Hotspur Training Centre; Attendance: 119; Referee: Joseph Gray

9 December 2024	Leyton Orient (3)	1–2	AFC Fylde (5)	Leyton
18:30 GMT	Samuel 72'		Holder 30'; McKay 45'	Stadium: Gaughan Group Stadium; Attendance: 232; Referee: Craig Wood

9 December 2024	Stoke City (2)	3–0	Woking (5)	Burton upon Trent
19:00 GMT	Bailey 25', 60'; Maskall 39'			Stadium: St George's Park; Attendance: 200; Referee: Jack Lambert

9 December 2024	Norwich City (2)	4–3	Brentford	Norwich
19:00 GMT	Myles 18', 21'; Sealey 51'; Corke 61'		Honor 33'; McSorley 45+1', 74'	Stadium: Carrow Road; Attendance: 401; Referee: Matthew Friend

9 December 2024	Newcastle United	2–1	Brighton & Hove Albion	Newcastle upon Tyne
19:00 GMT	Brayson 9'; Mills 41'		Howell 45' (pen.)	Stadium: Whitley Park; Attendance: 252; Referee: Glen Hart

9 December 2024	AFC Wimbledon (4)	1–2	Wolverhampton Wanderers	Wimbledon
19:30 GMT	Lawrence 22'	Report	Dayman 38', 42'	Stadium: Plough Lane; Attendance: 521; Referee: Stephen Hawkes

10 December 2024	Cardiff City (2)	3–2	Chesterfield (4)	Canton
19:00 GMT	Ola 40', 63' (pen.); Barton 75'		Stringer 72'; Elliott 77'	Stadium: Leckwith Stadium; Attendance: 119; Referee: Carl Peters

10 December 2024	Bristol City (2)	3–1	Sheffield Wednesday (2)	Failand
19:00 GMT	Sheppard 45'; Chaplin 64' (pen.), 83'		Weston 3'	Stadium: Robins High Performance Centre; Attendance: 200; Referee: Adam Gregory

10 December 2024	Fleetwood Town (4)	1–0	Burnley (2)	Fleetwood
19:00 GMT	Haughey 31'			Stadium: Highbury Stadium; Attendance: 275; Referee: Abid Hussain

10 December 2024	Carlisle United (4)	2–4 (a.e.t.)	Plymouth Argyle (2)	Carlisle
19:00 GMT	Hopper 70'; Lambert 80'		Fisher 66' (pen.); Shield 88'; Campbell 97'; Maund 120'	Stadium: Brunton Park; Attendance: 643; Referee: Thomas James

11 December 2024	AFC Bournemouth	3–2	Ipswich Town	Eastleigh
19:00 GMT	Stevens 21'; Day 45+1'; Salmon 55'		Towler 40'; Unadike 57'	Stadium: Silverlake Stadium; Attendance: 316; Referee: Robert Ablitt

11 December 2024	Everton	7–0	Nottingham Forest	Walton
19:00 GMT	Armstrong 24', 49', 90+4'; Davis 34'; Catesby 40'; Clarke 65'; Morgan 80'			Stadium: Goodison Park; Attendance: 475; Referee: Christopher Porter

11 December 2024	Swansea City (2)	0–2	Southampton	Landore
19:00 GMT			Okonola-Matthews 59'; 90+1'	Stadium: Landore Training Ground; Attendance: 229; Referee: Adam Wilson

11 December 2024	Lincoln City (3)	4–2	Wrexham (3)	Lincoln
19:00 GMT	Wifa 9'; Okoro 45', 84' (pen.); Vanderpuye 54'		Clayton 61'; Hazeldine 82'	Stadium: LNER Stadium; Attendance: 467; Referee: Ian Ruddock

12 December 2024	Harrogate Town (4)	4–6 (a.e.t.)	West Bromwich Albion (2)	Harrogate
19:00 GMT	Barnes 27'; Bray 74', 88'; Gregory 86'	Report	Morrish 30'; Bostock 66'; Deeming 73', 77'; Parmar 92'; Colesby 120+3'	Stadium: Exercise Stadium; Attendance: 659; Referee: Abdul Lamy

12 December 2024	Queens Park Rangers (2)	3–1	Swindon Town (4)	Shepherd's Bush
19:15 GMT	Sutton 8'; Coomes 72'; Hassan 87'		Hutt 65'	Stadium: MATRADE Loftus Road Stadium; Attendance: 713; Referee: Jordan Crossley

13 December 2024	Leicester City	2–3	Chelsea	Seagrave
19:00 GMT	Evans 28', 39' (pen.)		Dyer 45+2'; Mhueka 80'; Barbour 87'	Stadium: Leicester City F.C. Training Ground; Attendance: 300; Referee: Thomas Bingley

13 December 2024	Luton Town (2)	2–2 (a.e.t.) (3–4 p)	Crewe Alexandra (4)	Luton
19:00 GMT	Trustram 40'; Xavier-Jones 113'		Moore 19'; Mlynarski 103'	Stadium: Kenilworth Road; Attendance: 289; Referee: Stuart Smith
	Penalties
	Stitt (penalty missed); Xavier-Jones (penalty scored); Fox (penalty scored); Trustram (penalty scored); Chigozie (penalty missed)		(penalty scored) Moore; (penalty scored) Smith; (penalty scored) Dancey; (penalty scored) Mlynarski

16 December 2024	Portsmouth (2)	2–3 (a.e.t.)	Leeds United (2)	Portsmouth
19:00 GMT	Singerr 30'; May 90+1'	Report	Render 4'; McDonald 33'; Lopata-White 102'	Stadium: Fratton Park; Attendance: 627; Referee: James Kerten

17 December 2024	Derby County (2)	4–1	Sunderland (2)	Derby
19:00 GMT	Osayande 3'; Allen 74'; Osong 90'; Eames 90+1'		Samuel-Ogunsuyi 24'	Stadium: Pride Park Stadium; Attendance: 400; Referee: Karl Donaghy

17 December 2024	Sheffield United (2)	3–2	Blackburn Rovers (2)	York
19:00 GMT	McLachlan 4'; Sidibe 13'; Tawodzera 80'		Boggan 57'; Vare 73'	Stadium: LNER Community Stadium; Attendance: 143; Referee: Ashley Royston
Note: Match was originally going to be played at Brammall Lane on 5 December 2024, but was postponed due to a waterlogged pitch.

18 December 2024	Manchester United	5–0	Coventry City (2)	Leigh
19:00 GMT	Biancheri 3', 10', 78'; Obi 13', 54'			Stadium: Leigh Sports Village; Attendance: 485; Referee: Abid Hussain

18 December 2024	Merstham (8)	3–1	Burgess Hill Town (8)	Merstham
19:45 GMT	Perkins 10'; Cartwright 44'; Sesay 90+11'		Lawson 58'	Stadium: The Hybrid Fitness Stadium; Attendance: 510; Referee: Dario Matthewson
Note: match was originally going to be played 11 December 2024 but was postponed due to a pitch inspection.

21 December 2024	Stevenage (3)	0–1	Exeter City (3)	Stevenage
14:00 GMT			Cutler 60'	Stadium: Lamex Stadium; Attendance: 388; Referee: Nick Reece

=== Fourth Round ===
The 32 winners from the previous round compete in this round. The lowest ranked team left in the competition is Merstham, from the 8th tier. Merstham are the only team remaining who played in the Extra-Preliminary round, tying an FA Youth Cup record winning 8 consecutive matches to get to this stage in the competition. The draw was made on 13 December 2024.

Number of teams per tier still in competition
Premier League	Championship	League One	League Two	Non-League	Total
12 / 20	13 / 24	2 / 22	3 / 23	2 / 35	32 / 124

8 January 2025	Plymouth Argyle (2)	2–2 (a.e.t.) (5–4 p)	Lincoln City (3)	Plymouth
19:00 GMT	Poole 41'; Sullivan 53'	Report	Okoro 55' (pen.); Tomak 69'	Stadium: Home Park; Attendance: 562 or 561; Referee: Lewis Sandoe
	Penalties
	Fisher (penalty scored); Shield (penalty scored); Campbell (penalty scored); Rendle (penalty scored); Finn (penalty scored)		(penalty scored) Okoro; (penalty scored) Oliver; (penalty scored) Parks; (penalty missed) Ford; (penalty scored) Okewoye

14 January 2025	Stoke City (2)	0–2	West Bromwich Albion (2)	Stoke-on-Trent
19:00 GMT			Ranger 21'; Onyemachi 45+3'	Stadium: bet365 Stadium; Attendance: 400

14 January 2025	Fleetwood Town (4)	0–3	Southampton	Fleetwood
19:00 GMT			Dibaga 75'; Dipepa 80'; Robinson 83'	Stadium: Highbury Stadium; Attendance: 277; Referee: Dean Watson

15 January 2025	AFC Bournemouth	1–3	Norwich City (2)	Eastleigh
19:00 GMT	Stevens 77'		Corke 9', 59'; Sealey 44'	Stadium: Silverlake Stadium; Attendance: 221; Referee: Steven Hughes

15 January 2025	Chelsea	7–1	Merstham (8)	Kingston upon Thames
19:00 GMT	Mheuka 14', 32', 47' (pen.); Kavuma-McQueen 23'; Cardoso 28'; Walsh 52'; Ezenwata 88'	Report	Perkins 38'	Stadium: Kingsmeadow; Attendance: 1,202; Referee: Nathan Oakes

16 January 2025	Watford (2)	4–1	Crewe Alexandra (4)	King's Langley
19:00 GMT	Okusun 22'; Nabizada 72', 85'; Odiase 86'		Dancey 69'	Stadium: The Orbital Fasteners Stadium; Attendance: 181
Note: Match was originally going to be played on 8 January 2025 but was postponed due to a frozen pitch.

16 January 2025	Newcastle United	0–4	Aston Villa	Newcastle upon Tyne
19:00 GMT			Brannigan 4', 71'; McGrath 35'; Cotcher 41'	Stadium: Whitley Park; Attendance: 279

16 January 2025	Manchester City	5–1	Millwall (2)	Manchester
19:00 GMT	Mfuni 8'; Miles 45+1' (o.g.); McAidoo 50'; Warhurst 61'; Mukasa 65'		Abdulazeez 41' (pen.)	Stadium: Joie Stadium; Attendance: 364; Referee: Shaun Taylor

16 January 2025	Exeter City (3)	1–4	Fulham	Dorchester
19:30 GMT	Ohanaka 29'		Wingate 26', 43'; Wahid 65', 79'	Stadium: The Avenue Stadium; Attendance: 200; Referee: Steven Swan
Note: match was moved to The Avenue Stadium because of schedule congestion.

17 January 2025	AFC Fylde (5)	2–3	Leeds United (2)	Wesham
19:00 GMT	Holder 63'; Da Silva 65'		Pickles 31', 37'; Dudley 75'	Stadium: Mill Farm; Attendance: 989; Referee: Richard Holmes

17 January 2025	Cardiff City (2)	1–2	Bristol City (2)	Canton
19:00 GMT	Ola 42'		Skinner 45'; Hogg 53'	Stadium: Leckwith Stadium; Attendance: 346

17 January 2025	Manchester United	5–2	Preston North End (2)	Leigh
19:00 GMT	Fletcher 7'; Munro 19'; Obi 25', 34'; Ibragimov 90' (pen.)		Rodríguez-Gentile 50', 57'	Stadium: Leigh Sports Village; Attendance: 1,439

18 January 2025	Arsenal	3–3 (a.e.t.) (4–2 p)	Queens Park Rangers (2)	Borehamwood
17:00 GMT	Harriman-Annous 12'; Dowman 70'; Zečević-John 98'		Sutton 30', 54', 115'	Stadium: Meadow Park; Attendance: 673
	Penalties
	Casey (penalty missed); Dowman (penalty scored); Marciniak (penalty scored); Zečević-John (penalty scored); Chapman (penalty scored)		(penalty missed) Putman; (penalty missed) Hassan; (penalty scored) Ashamu; (penalty scored) Street

20 January 2025	Grimsby Town (4)	3–5 (a.e.t.)	Tottenham Hotspur	Cleethorpes
19:00 GMT	Midwinter 66'; Giles 89'; Onoh 90+5'		Williams-Barnett 52'; Thompson 72'; Lehane 83'; Byfield 102'; Moncur 108'	Stadium: Blundell Park; Attendance: 927
Note: Match was originally going to be played on 7 January 2025 but was postponed due to a waterlogged pitch.

21 January 2025	Everton	3–1	Wolverhampton Wanderers	Walton
19:15 GMT	Morgan 26', 33'; Loney 90'		Dayman 90+3'	Stadium: Goodison Park; Attendance: 413; Referee: Declan Brown

22 January 2025	Sheffield United (2)	1–3	Derby County (2)	York
18:00 GMT	Okyere 29'		Allen 39', 90+5'; McAndrew 54'	Stadium: LNER Community Stadium; Attendance: 121
Note: Match was originally going to be played on 16 January 2025 but was postponed due to a frozen pitch.

=== Fifth Round ===
The 16 winners from the previous round compete in this round. The lowest ranked teams in the competition are Bristol City, Derby County, Leeds United, Norwich City, Plymouth Argyle, Watford, and West Bromwich Albion from the EFL Championship in the second tier. The draw was made on 10 January 2025.

Number of teams per tier still in competition
Premier League	Championship	League One	League Two	Non-League	Total
9 / 20	7 / 24	0 / 22	0 / 23	0 / 35	16 / 124

28 January 2025	Norwich City (2)	2–4	West Bromwich Albion (2)	Norwich
19:00 GMT	Oligbo 10'; Myles 69'		Onyemachi 14'; Deeming 16'; Parmar 63'; Bostock 74'	Stadium: Carrow Road; Attendance: 382; Referee: Jack Willmore

31 January 2025	Fulham	1–2	Arsenal	New Malden
19:00 GMT	Ridgeon 42'		Harriman-Annous 25'; Dowman 38'	Stadium: Motspur Park; Attendance: 2,000; Referee: Ayrton Hursey

4 February 2025	Everton	0–1	Plymouth Argyle (2)	Walton
19:00 GMT			Fisher 2' (pen.)	Stadium: Walton Hall Park; Attendance: 317; Referee: Kavan Hurn

4 February 2025	Southampton	4–1	Derby County (2)	Southampton
19:00 GMT	Dibaga 23'; Dipepa 45+3', 65'; Gathercole 70'		Allen 1'	Stadium: St. Mary's Stadium; Attendance: 500; Referee: Steven Hughes

4 February 2025	Aston Villa	3–2	Bristol City (2)	Bodymoor Heath
19:00 GMT	Cotcher 60', 85', 90+6'		Sheppard 18'; Gibbs 50'	Stadium: Bodymoor Heath Training Ground; Attendance: 367; Referee: Harry Jones

4 February 2025	Leeds United (2)	1–6	Manchester City	York
19:00 GMT	Boast 45+4'		Warhurst 4', 42'; Heskey 20'; McAidoo 57'; Gorman 65'; Fletcher 87'	Stadium: York Community Stadium; Attendance: 672; Referee: Liam Smith

12 February 2025	Manchester United	5–1	Chelsea	Leigh
19:00 GMT	Obi 26', 50', 64'; Scanlon 34', 38'		Walsh 21'	Stadium: Leigh Sports Village; Attendance: 738; Referee: Callum Jones

13 February 2025	Watford (2)	4–2	Tottenham Hotspur	Watford
19:00 GMT	Okosun 9'; Nabizada 17', 45+1' (pen.); Massiah-Edwards 81' (o.g.)		Elliott-Parris 22'; Hall 72'	Stadium: Vicarage Road; Attendance: 2,021; Referee: Tom Ellsmore

=== Quarter-finals ===
The eight winners from the previous round will compete in this round. The lowest ranked teams in the competition are Plymouth Argyle, Watford, and West Bromwich Albion from the EFL Championship in the second tier. The draw was made on 31 January 2025.

Number of teams per tier still in competition
Premier League	Championship	League One	League Two	Non-League	Total
5 / 20	3 / 24	0 / 22	0 / 23	0 / 35	8 / 124

25 February 2025	Watford (2)	2–1	Southampton	Watford
19:00 GMT	Okosun 12'; Massiah-Edwards 75'		Oyekunle 37'	Stadium: Vicarage Road; Attendance: 2,031

27 February 2025	West Bromwich Albion (2)	0–6	Manchester City	West Bromwich
19:00 GMT		Report	Warhurst 36'; Mfuni 45'; Gorman 45+3', 55', 90+2'; Heskey 56'	Stadium: The Hawthorns; Attendance: 670; Referee: Declan Bourne

28 February 2025	Arsenal	2–3 (a.e.t.)	Manchester United	Holloway
	Copley 42'; Dowman 57' (pen.)		Fletcher 36'; Kamason 85'; Mantato 100'	Stadium: Emirates Stadium; Attendance: 5,500

14 March 2025	Aston Villa	3–0	Plymouth Argyle (2)	Birmingham
19:00 GMT	Jimoh-Aloba 44'; Burrowes 58'; Brannigan 73'	Report		Stadium: Villa Park; Attendance: 934; Referee: Andrew Humphries

=== Semi-finals ===
The lowest ranked team in the competition is Watford from the EFL Championship in the second tier. The draw was done on 28 February 2025.

Number of teams per tier still in competition
Premier League	Championship	League One	League Two	Non-League	Total
3 / 20	1 / 24	0 / 22	0 / 23	0 / 35	4 / 124

31 March 2025	Aston Villa	1–1 (a.e.t.) (3–1 p)	Manchester United	Birmingham
19:00 GMT	Mulley 14'		Scanlon 23'	Stadium: Villa Park; Attendance: 2,863
	Penalties
	Quinn (penalty scored); Jimoh-Aloba (penalty scored); Jenner (penalty scored)		(penalty missed) Thwaites; (penalty scored) Scanlon; (penalty missed) Ibragimov; (penalty missed) Baumann

10 April 2025	Watford (2)	0–1	Manchester City	Watford
19:00 GMT			Warhurst 3'	Stadium: Vicarage Road; Attendance: 4,121

=== Final ===
The draw was done on 28 February 2025.

5 May 2025
15:00 GMT

Aston Villa	3–1	Manchester City
Carroll 4'; Brannigan 31'; Jimoh-Aloba 67'	Report	Warhurst 2'

Villa Park, Birmingham
Attendance: 25,073
