= 2024–25 Professional U18 Development League =

U18 Premier League
- Season: 2024–25
- Champions: Aston Villa (1st title)
- Youth League: Liverpool; Arsenal; Manchester City; Chelsea; Newcastle United; Tottenham Hotspur
- Matches: 313 (312 RS, 1 PO)
- Goals: 1,350 (4.31 per match) (1349 RS, 1 PO)
- Top goalscorer: (England) Nicholas Oyekunle Southampton (27 Goals)
- Biggest home win: Manchester United 13–1 Leeds United (5 April 2025)
- Biggest away win: Leeds United 0–8 Manchester United (2 November 2024)
- Highest scoring: Manchester United 13–1 Leeds United (5 April 2025)
- Longest winning run: 21 matches Manchester City (1 September 2024 – 26 April 2025)
- Longest unbeaten run: 22 matches Manchester City (1 September 2024 – 10 May 2025)
- Longest winless run: 13 matches Leeds United (17 August 2024 – 15 February 2025); Wolverhampton Wanderers (2 November 2024 – 15 March 2025)
- Longest losing run: 6 matches Middlesbrough (31 August 2024 – 26 October 2024); Nottingham Forest (19 October 2024 – 14 December 2024)

The 2024–25 Professional U18 Development League was the 13th season of the Professional Development League system. There were 26 teams competing, divided into North and South divisions according to their region.

== North ==
Pos	Team	Pld	W	D	L	GF	GA	GD	Pts	
1	Manchester City (R)	24	21	2	1	90	20	+70	65	Qualification for the National Final
2	Manchester United	24	20	3	1	90	24	+66	63	
3	Everton	24	14	4	6	55	47	+8	46	
4	Derby County	24	14	2	8	73	44	+29	44	
5	Newcastle United	24	10	5	9	55	57	−2	35	
6	Sunderland	24	10	2	12	57	52	+5	32	
7	Blackburn Rovers	24	9	5	10	49	63	−14	32	
8	Stoke City	24	7	6	11	47	59	−12	27	
9	Wolverhampton Wanderers	24	7	3	14	36	49	−13	24	
10	Middlesbrough	24	7	3	14	45	74	−29	24	
11	Liverpool	24	5	4	15	42	71	−29	19	
12	Nottingham Forest	24	5	3	16	33	65	−32	18	
13	Leeds United	24	3	6	15	36	83	−47	15	

Source: Premier League Under 18 Table
(R) Regional League Champions

=== Results ===
Home \ Away	BLB	DER	EVE	LEE	LIV	MNC	MNU	MID	NEW	NFO	STK	SUN	WOL
Blackburn Rovers	—	0–6	1–3	6–2	5–0	0–2	1–2	0–1	3–1	5–2	3–3	1–5	2–1
Derby County	1–2	—	2–1	1–0	5–1	3–5	2–3	3–1	0–3	3–1	6–2	0–3	5–1
Everton	1–1	3–2	—	3–2	3–2	0–4	4–4	4–4	3–2	2–3	2–1	2–1	2–1
Leeds United	1–1	0–6	2–4	—	2–2	0–0	0–8	0–3	4–5	3–2	1–1	0–2	4–0
Liverpool	0–2	1–4	0–3	1–3	—	0–5	2–2	2–3	2–3	2–2	2–0	4–2	4–2
Manchester City	5–0	4–3	4–1	3–2	3–1	—	0–2	6–0	7–1	6–0	4–1	2–0	2–0
Manchester United	9–0	4–3	3–0	13–1	2–0	0–4	—	3–1	0–0	6–0	4–0	3–1	2–1
Middlesbrough	1–3	2–4	1–3	6–3	2–7	0–7	0–4	—	2–4	4–3	2–3	2–2	2–3
Newcastle United	1–5	3–3	1–2	3–3	3–1	3–3	1–5	0–1	—	3–0	4–1	3–3	0–1
Nottingham Forest	2–2	0–3	0–3	4–1	5–2	0–4	0–3	1–2	0–1	—	1–1	1–3	1–4
Stoke City	2–2	3–3	2–1	5–1	3–3	1–2	0–3	4–3	5–3	0–3	—	4–0	2–0
Sunderland	7–2	0–3	2–3	3–0	6–1	2–5	3–4	3–0	1–3	0–2	4–3	—	2–0
Wolverhampton Wanderers	5–2	1–2	2–2	1–1	1–2	0–3	0–1	2–2	2–4	2–0	2–0	4–2	—

Source: Premier League Under 18 Results
Legend: Blue = home team win; Yellow = draw; Red = away team win.

== South ==
Pos	Team	Pld	W	D	L	GF	GA	GD	Pts	
1	Aston Villa (R, C)	24	15	2	7	47	37	+10	47	Qualification for the National Final
2	Southampton	24	13	6	5	68	41	+27	45	
3	Arsenal	24	13	5	6	68	53	+15	44	
4	Chelsea	24	13	3	8	58	46	+12	42	
5	Fulham	24	12	3	9	44	37	+7	39	
6	Crystal Palace	24	10	8	6	48	39	+9	38	
7	Tottenham Hotspur	24	10	7	7	64	48	+16	37	
8	Reading	24	9	5	10	30	42	−12	32	
9	West Ham United	24	6	7	11	40	53	−13	25	
10	Brighton & Hove Albion	24	6	6	12	45	54	−9	24	
11	Norwich City	24	6	5	13	44	60	−16	23	
12	Leicester City	24	6	5	13	51	70	−19	23	
13	West Bromwich Albion	24	3	6	15	34	61	−27	15	

Source: Premier League Under 18 Table
(C) Champions; (R) Regional League Champions

=== Results ===
Home \ Away	ARS	AVL	BHA	CHE	CRY	FUL	LEI	NOR	REA	SOU	TOT	WBA	WHU
Arsenal	—	2–4	2–3	1–0	1–1	2–1	4–3	3–1	4–0	3–3	4–4	3–2	3–1
Aston Villa	0–3	—	1–0	1–2	3–1	4–1	1–0	1–1	4–0	2–4	2–0	2–1	1–3
Brighton & Hove Albion	3–3	1–2	—	3–4	0–2	0–2	3–4	1–1	1–1	2–1	3–5	5–1	1–1
Chelsea	2–3	6–2	2–5	—	1–0	2–1	2–5	5–1	1–2	4–3	3–3	4–1	2–2
Crystal Palace	1–2	4–1	3–3	4–2	—	0–6	1–1	4–2	0–0	1–1	1–1	2–2	3–1
Fulham	4–3	0–2	2–0	1–0	0–2	—	2–2	2–1	2–2	2–1	1–5	2–1	0–1
Leicester City	3–5	1–4	0–4	1–3	1–2	1–2	—	4–3	2–2	1–2	0–7	4–2	1–1
Norwich City	3–2	2–3	4–1	1–3	4–1	1–5	2–2	—	2–5	2–2	0–4	1–0	3–0
Reading	1–0	0–1	3–1	0–2	0–3	1–0	4–2	0–5	—	0–3	2–0	1–0	1–4
Southampton	2–5	2–3	5–1	2–1	1–1	2–1	6–1	5–0	2–1	—	3–3	5–1	4–2
Tottenham Hotspur	6–4	2–1	2–2	0–0	6–4	2–3	3–1	3–1	1–0	2–4	—	2–3	1–1
West Bromwich Albion	3–3	1–1	3–0	2–4	0–2	0–2	2–5	3–3	1–1	0–3	1–0	—	2–2
West Ham United	2–3	0–1	0–2	2–3	0–5	2–2	3–6	1–0	1–3	2–2	4–2	4–2	—

Source: Premier League Under 18 Results
Legend: Blue = home team win; Yellow = draw; Red = away team win.

==== National Final ====
17 May 2025
13:00 BST

Aston Villa U18s	1–0	Manchester City U18s
Routh 75'	Report 1 Report 2

Villa Park, Aston
Attendance: 5,739 or 10,000
Referee: Harrison Blair

== Season statistics ==
=== Top goalscorers ===
As of 17 May 2025

Rank	Player	Club	Goals
1	(England) Nicholas Oyekunle	Southampton	27
2	(England) Luca Williams-Barnett	Tottenham Hotspur	19
3	(England) Dan Casey	Arsenal	18
3	(England) Reigan Heskey	Manchester City	18
4	(England) Divine Mukasa	Manchester City	16
4	(England) Victor Musa	Manchester United	16
4	(Australia) Marcus Neill	Sunderland	16
5	(England) Max Dowman	Arsenal	15
5	(England) Charles Ebuka Agbawodikeizu	Derby County	15
5	(England) Matthew Warhurst	Manchester City	15
6	(England) Justin Oguntolu	Derby County	14
6	(Gibraltar) James Scanlon	Manchester United	14
6	(England) Elisha Sowunmi	West Ham United	14
7	(England) Ellis Lehane	Tottenham Hotspur	13
8	(England) Frankie Coulson	Middlesbrough	12
8	(England) Lorenz Hutchinson	Leicester City	12
9	(England) Joe Bradshaw	Liverpool	11
9	(Northern Ireland) Cole Brannigan	Aston Villa	11
9	(England) Benjamin Casey	Crystal Palace	11
9	(England) Finlay Corke	Norwich City	11
9	(England) Chizaram Ezenwata	Chelsea	11
9	(England) Harry Gathercole	Southampton	11
9	(England) Ryan McAidoo	Manchester City	11
9	(England) Divine Onyemachi	West Bromwich Albion	11
9	(England) Tom Wingate	Fulham	11

=== Hat-tricks ===
As of 3 May 2025

Player	For	Against	Result	Date	Ref.
(England) Sean Neave	Newcastle United U18s	Derby County U18s	3–3 (H)	24 August 2024	
(England) Charles Ebuka Agbawodikeizu	Derby County U18s	Stoke City U18s	6–2 (H)	31 August 2024	
(England) Dan Casey	Arsenal U18s	West Bromwich Albion U18s	3–3 (A)	31 August 2024	
(Gibraltar) James Scanlon^{4}	Manchester United U18s	Blackburn Rovers U18s	9–0 (H)	28 September 2024	
(Wales) Isaac Davies	Nottingham Forest U18s	Leeds United U18s	4–1 (H)	28 September 2024	
(England) Andre Harriman-Annous	Arsenal U18s	Brighton & Hove Albion U18s	3–3 (A)	28 September 2024	
(England) Charles Ebuka Agbawodikeizu^{4}	Derby County U18s	Leeds United U18s	0–6 (A)	19 October 2024	
(England) Bradley Burrowes	Aston Villa U18s	Arsenal U18s	2–4 (A)	19 October 2024	
(England) Sean Neave	Newcastle United U18s	Leeds United U18s	4–5 (A)	26 October 2024	
(Denmark) Chido Obi	Manchester United U18s	Nottingham Forest U18s	6–0 (H)	26 October 2024	
(England) Elisha Sowunmi	West Ham United U18s	Reading U18s	1–4 (A)	26 October 2024	
(Gibraltar) James Scanlon	Manchester United U18s	Leeds United U18s	0–8 (A)	2 November 2024	
(Russia) Amir Ibragimov	Manchester United U18s	Leeds United U18s	0–8 (A)	2 November 2024	
(England) Joe Boggan	Blackburn Rovers U18s	Nottingham Forest U18s	5–2 (H)	9 November 2024	
(England) Elisha Sowunmi	West Ham United U18s	Aston Villa U18s	1–3 (A)	9 November 2024	
(England) Divine Mukasa	Manchester City U18s	Newcastle United U18s	7–1 (H)	30 November 2024	
(England) Luca Williams-Barnett	Tottenham Hotspur U18s	Brighton & Hove Albion U18s	3–5 (A)	8 February 2025	
(England) Dan Casey	Arsenal U18s	Southampton U18s	2–5 (A)	15 February 2025	
(England) Lorenz Hutchinson	Leicester City U18s	West Ham United U18s	3–6 (A)	15 February 2025	
(England) Finlay Corke	Norwich City U18s	Crystal Palace U18s	4–1 (H)	15 February 2025	
(England) Nicholas Oyekunle^{4}	Southampton U18s	Norwich City U18s	5–0 (H)	21 February 2025	
(England) Charles Ebuka Agbawodikeizu	Derby County U18s	Middlesbrough U18s	2–4 (A)	22 February 2025	
(England) Daniel Casey	Arsenal U18s	Tottenham Hotspur U18s	6–4 (H)	8 March 2025	
(England) Nicholas Oyekunle	Southampton U18s	Brighton & Hove Albion U18s	5–1 (H)	8 March 2025	
(England) Max Dowman	Arsenal U18s	Leicester City U18s	3–5 (A)	5 April 2025	
(England) Victor Musa^{6}	Manchester United U18s	Leeds United U18s	13–1 (H)	5 April 2025	
(England) Jim Thwaites	Manchester United U18s	Leeds United U18s	13–1 (H)	5 April 2025	
(England) Justin Clarke^{4}	Everton U18s	Leeds United U18s	2–4 (A)	8 April 2025	
(Australia) Marcus Neill	Sunderland U18s	Liverpool U18s	6–1 (H)	12 April 2025	
(England) Harry Gathercole	Southampton U18s	Chelsea U18s	4–3 (A)	12 April 2025	
(Australia) Marcus Neill^{4}	Sunderland U18s	Blackburn Rovers U18s	7–2 (H)	23 April 2025	
(Grenada) Ellis Lehane	Tottenham Hotspur U18s	Leicester City U18s	0–7 (A)	26 April 2025	
(England) Oliver Boast	Leeds United U18s	Wolverhampton Wanderers U18s	4–0 (H)	26 April 2025	
(England) Max Dowman^{4}	Arsenal U18s	Reading U18s	4–0 (H)	26 April 2025	
(England) Kacey Wooster	Newcastle United U18s	Leeds United U18s	3–3 (H)	30 April 2025	
(England) Frankie Coulson	Middlesbrough U18s	Leeds United U18s	6–3 (H)	3 May 2025	

Note

(H) – Home; (A) – Away
^{4} – player scored 4 goals ^{6} - player scored 6 goals

== Professional Development League ==
U18 Professional Development League
- Season: 2024–25
- Champions: Bristol City (1st Title)
- Matches: 344 (341 RS, 3 PO)
- Goals: 1,384 (4.02 per match) (1376 RS, 8 PO)
- Top goalscorer: (Scotland) Caelan-Kole Cadamarteri Sheffield Wednesday (24 Goals)
- Biggest home win: Millwall 9–0 Bristol City (8 March 2025)
- Biggest away win: Queens Park Rangers 0–8 Burnley (3 September 2024)
- Highest scoring: Ipswich Town 7–4 Colchester United (18 January 2025), Peterborough United 3–8 Fleetwood Town (19 April 2025)
- Longest winning run: 10 matches Burnley (14 December 2024 – 22 March 2025)
- Longest unbeaten run: 17 matches Bristol City (14 September 2024 – 4 March 2025)
- Longest winless run: 9 matches Colchester United (24 August 2024 – 2 November 2024); Fleetwood Town (31 August 2024 – 4 January 2025); Peterborough United (25 March 2025 – 3 May 2025)
- Longest losing run: 9 matches Colchester United (24 August 2024 – 2 November 2024)
- All statistics correct as of 16 May 2025.

The Professional Development League 2 is an Under-18 football's second tier, designed for those academies with Category 2 status. The league is split regionally into north and south divisions, with each team facing opponents in their own region twice both home and away and opponents in the other region once resulting in 31 games played. The sides finishing in the top two positions in both regions at the end of the season will progress to a knockout stage to determine the overall league champion. Birmingham City are the defending champions. Brentford make their return to this level after 9 years.

=== Tables ===
==== North Division ====
Pos	Team	Pld	W	D	L	GF	GA	GD	Pts	Qualification
1	Burnley (R)	31	22	3	6	88	26	+62	69	Qualification for Knock-out stage
2	Sheffield Wednesday	31	20	5	6	86	45	+41	65	Qualification for Knock-out stage
3	Coventry City	31	17	4	10	59	50	+9	55	
4	Sheffield United	31	15	5	11	65	61	+4	50	
5	Wigan Athletic	31	15	3	13	69	46	+23	48	
6	Barnsley	31	14	5	12	54	48	+6	47	
7	Crewe Alexandra	31	13	5	13	58	54	+4	44	
8	Hull City	31	12	5	14	46	60	−14	41	
9	Birmingham City	31	11	3	17	47	65	−18	36	
10	Peterborough United	31	8	3	20	49	77	−28	27	
11	Fleetwood Town	31	7	3	21	42	91	−49	24	

Source: Under 18 Professional Development League table
(R) Regional League Champions

==== South Division ====
Pos	Team	Pld	W	D	L	GF	GA	GD	Pts	Qualification
1	Bristol City (R, C)	31	20	6	5	73	45	+28	66	Qualification for Knock-out stage
2	Watford	31	19	3	9	67	45	+22	60	Qualification for Knock-out stage
3	Cardiff City	31	16	4	11	75	59	+16	52	
4	Millwall	31	14	5	12	72	48	+24	47	
5	AFC Bournemouth	31	14	2	15	75	64	+11	44	
6	Brentford	31	13	5	13	67	67	0	44	
7	Swansea City	31	13	4	14	64	63	+1	43	
8	Charlton Athletic	31	10	4	17	62	69	−7	34	
9	Ipswich Town	31	8	5	18	58	91	−33	29	
10	Queens Park Rangers	31	7	6	18	50	106	−56	27	
11	Colchester United	31	7	4	20	50	96	−46	25	

Source: Under 18 Professional Development League table
(C) Champions; (R) Regional League Champions

=== Results ===
Home \ Away	BAR	BIR	BUR	COV	CRE	FLE	HUL	PET	SHU	SHW	WIG	BOU	BRE	BRI	CAR	CHA	COL	IPS	MIL	QPR	SWA	WAT
Barnsley	—	0–4	0–2	0–2	2–0	4–1	0–1	6–4	4–3	3–3	2–0	2–0	3–1		1–1		4–2		1–0		0–1	
Birmingham City	0–2	—	2–2	1–3	1–0	2–2	1–3	1–2	2–3	1–5	1–0		2–1	6–1		0–2		4–3		4–0		2–1
Burnley	1–0	3–0	—	6–0	3–0	3–1	3–0	2–0	5–2	1–1	1–0	1–2		3–1	1–2		2–0		0–1		5–2	
Coventry City	3–2	2–0	0–2	—	2–2	0–0	2–1	2–0	1–2	5–2	0–1		1–2		3–2	3–3		4–2		7–1		2–1
Crewe Alexandra	2–1	2–1	1–1	2–1	—	2–0	3–0	0–0	3–2	1–2	1–4	6–0		2–3		1–4	8–1		3–1		0–1	
Fleetwood Town	1–2	0–1	1–6	1–3	0–3	—	4–1	1–4	1–3	0–5	0–4		1–5		1–3		3–2	1–0		2–2		1–4
Hull City	1–3	0–4	1–0	0–2	1–1	3–6	—	4–2	2–2	6–1	1–5	3–2		0–1		4–3		0–2	2–2		0–2	
Peterborough United	2–0	4–0	0–1	0–1	0–2	3–8	0–1	—	1–3	1–2	3–2		1–3		0–4		3–1		1–6	6–0		0–2
Sheffield United	0–3	1–2	1–0	0–1	6–3	0–2	2–1	4–1	—	1–1	0–1	2–5		2–1		2–0		3–1		4–1	4–2	
Sheffield Wednesday	3–2	3–0	4–2	3–1	6–1	4–0	4–0	2–1	1–0	—	0–2		3–1		4–1		6–0		2–0		2–1	0–3
Wigan Athletic	1–1	4–2	0–3	1–2	1–2	6–0	1–1	6–0	4–5	2–1	—	1–2		2–4		0–2		1–0		5–1		4–0
AFC Bournemouth		2–2		1–1		5–0		3–1		4–3		—	2–3	1–2	5–2	0–2	1–3	6–0	4–2	4–5	0–1	0–1
Brentford			0–5		1–1		0–2		7–1		5–2	3–2	—	1–3	4–2	3–2	5–3	1–2	1–3	2–2	1–0	2–3
Bristol City	3–0			4–1		3–0		4–1		1–1		2–0	1–1	—	2–0	2–1	3–0	1–1	2–2	1–1	3–1	3–1
Cardiff City		2–0			2–1		0–3		2–2		3–3	0–2	3–1	1–3	—	0–0	3–1	4–3	2–4	3–4	5–0	4–1
Charlton Athletic	0–1		3–4			3–1		2–2		2–4		2–4	2–2	1–2	3–4	—	3–1	5–2	1–3	6–3	1–5	0–2
Colchester United		2–0		3–1			1–2		1–1		1–4	2–1	3–3	2–2	1–2	1–3	—	2–3	3–1	3–2	1–1	0–4
Ipswich Town	3–3		0–7		2–3			1–3		1–7		2–3	2–0	0–5	1–5	2–3	7–4	—	1–3	3–1	4–1	1–1
Millwall		5–0		1–2		3–0			2–2		1–0	3–2	3–0	9–0	1–2	2–1	2–3	2–2	—	1–2	1–1	3–4
Queens Park Rangers	2–2		0–8		3–1		1–2			1–1		2–6	2–5	0–7	0–7	4–0	5–1	0–2	0–3	—	2–2	1–2
Swansea City		5–1		4–1		2–3		3–3			1–2	4–3	1–2	2–3	2–3	3–1	6–2	5–2	2–1	0–1	—	0–5
Watford	1–0		1–5		2–1		0–0		0–2			1–3	4–1	2–0	2–1	2–1	5–0	3–3	2–1	6–1	1–3	—

Source: Under 18 Professional Development League Results
Legend: Blue = home team win; Yellow = draw; Red = away team win.

=== Knock-out stage ===
==== Semi-finals ====
9 May 2025
19:00 BST

Burnley U18s	1–2	Watford U18s
Masara 8'	Report	Shevchenko 40'; Nabizada 87'

Turf Moor, Burnley
10 May 2025
14:00 BST

Bristol City U18s	2–0	Sheffield Wednesday U18s
Sheppard 22'; Derrick 40'	Report

Ashton Gate, Bristol

==== Professional Development League National Final ====
16 May 2025
13:00 BST

Bristol City U18s	2–1 (a.e.t.)	Watford U18s
Pecover 54'; Jackson 103'	Report	Smith-Daley 90+4'

Ashton Gate, Bristol

=== Top goalscorers ===
As of 16 May 2025

Rank	Player	Club	Goals
1	(Scotland) Caelan-Kole Cadamarteri	Sheffield Wednesday U18s	24
2	(Republic of Ireland) Kian McMahon-Brown	Burnley U18s	21
2	(England) Jordan Hodkin	Crewe Alexandra U18s	21
4	(England) Cole Simms	Wigan Athletic U18s	20
5	(Scotland) Jevan Beattie	Sheffield United U18s	17
5	(England) Zach Johnson	Burnley U18s	17
5	(England) Bolu Shofowoke	Peterborough United U18s	17
8	(England) Jonny Day	AFC Bournemouth U18s	16
9	(England) Ellis McMillan	Charlton Athletic U18s	15
9	(England) Benji Wetshi	Burnley U18s	15
11	(Wales) Mannie Barton	Cardiff City U18s	14
11	(England) Harrison Bettoni	Wigan Athletic U18s	14
11	(Wales) William Grainger	Sheffield Wednesday U18s	14
11	(Wales) Zac Jagielka	Hull City U18s	14
11	(England) Tobey Ugorji	Birmingham City U18s	14

=== Hat-tricks ===
As of 16 May 2025

Player	For	Against	Result	Date	Ref.
(England) Cole Simms	Wigan Athletic U18s	Queens Park Rangers U18s	5–1 (H)	10 August 2024	
(England) Zach Johnson	Burnley U18s	Queens Park Rangers U18s	0–8 (A)	3 September 2024	
(England) Benji Wetshi	Burnley U18s	Queens Park Rangers U18s	0–8 (A)	3 September 2024	
(Scotland) Jevan Beattie	Sheffield United U18s	Crewe Alexandra U18s	6–3 (H)	24 September 2024	
(England) Benji Wetshi	Burnley U18s	Wigan Athletic U18s	0–3 (A)	24 September 2024	
(England) Harry Hogg	Bristol City U18s	Queens Park Rangers U18s	0–7 (A)	12 October 2024	
(Afghanistan) Amin Nabizada	Watford U18s	Queens Park Rangers U18s	6–1 (H)	19 October 2024	
(Scotland) Jevan Beattie	Sheffield United U18s	Wigan Athletic U18s	4–5 (A)	19 October 2024	
(England) Jonny Day	AFC Bournemouth U18s	Millwall U18s	4–2 (H)	19 October 2024	
(Afghanistan) Amin Nabizada	Watford U18s	Swansea City U18s	0–5 (A)	26 October 2024	
(England) Jonny Day	AFC Bournemouth U18s	Queens Park Rangers U18s	2–6 (A)	26 October 2024	
(Wales) Morgan Bates	Swansea City U18s	Colchester United U18s	6–2 (H)	29 November 2024	
(England) Harry Hogg	Bristol City U18s	Brentford U18s	1–3 (A)	30 November 2024	
(Wales) Mannie Barton	Cardiff City U18s	Watford U18s	4–1 (H)	14 December 2024	
(England) Kai Martin	Colchester United U18s	Queens Park Rangers U18s	3–2 (H)	14 December 2024	
(England) Michael McSorley	Brentford U18s	Queens Park Rangers U18s	2–5 (A)	20 December 2024	
(England) Michael McSorley	Sheffield United U18s	Peterborough United U18s	4–1 (H)	15 February 2025	
(England) Harrison Bettoni	Wigan Athletic U18s	Crewe Alexandra U18s	1–4 (A)	8 March 2025	
(Scotland) Caelan-Kole Cadamarteri^{4}	Sheffield Wednesday U18s	Crewe Alexandra U18s	6–1 (H)	15 March 2025	
(England) Max Smith	Watford U18s	Brentford U18s	4–1 (H)	22 March 2025	
(England) Benji Wetshi	Burnley U18s	Sheffield United U18s	5–2 (H)	22 March 2025	
(Wales) Jack Sykes	Cardiff City U18s	Wigan Athletic U18s	3–3 (H)	5 April 2025	
(England) Philip Sanyaolu	Queens Park Rangers U18s	Crewe Alexandra U18s	3–1 (H)	5 April 2025	
(Wales) Tom Woodward	Swansea City U18s	Birmingham City U18s	5–1 (H)	8 April 2025	
(Scotland) Caelan-Kole Cadamarteri^{5}	Sheffield Wednesday U18s	Colchester United U18s	6–0 (H)	12 April 2025	
(Republic of Ireland) Kian McMahon-Brown	Burnley U18s	Swansea City U18s	5–2 (H)	12 April 2025	
(England) Jordan Hodkin^{5}	Crewe Alexandra U18s	AFC Bournemouth U18s	6–0 (H)	12 April 2025	
(England) Cole Simms	Wigan Athletic U18s	Fleetwood Town U18s	6–0 (H)	29 April 2025	

Note

(H) – Home; (A) – Away
^{4} – player scored 4 goals ^{5} – player scored 5 goals

== EFL Youth Alliance ==
Football League Youth Alliance
- Season: 2024-25
- Champions: Bolton Wanderers
- Matches: 553
- Goals: 2,171 (3.93 per match)
- Biggest home win: Oxford United 9–0 Cheltenham Town (8 February 2025)
- Biggest away win: Chesterfield 0–7 Rotherham United (17 August 2024); Newport County 1–8 Luton Town (15 April 2025)
- Highest scoring: Gillingham 6–5 Leyton Orient (8 February 2025)
- Longest winning run: 15 matches – Oxford United (12 November 2024 – 12 April 2025)
- Longest unbeaten run: 21 matches – Bolton Wanderers (10 August 2024 – 19 April 2025)
- Longest winless run: 11 matches – Huddersfield Town (10 August 2024 – 30 November 2024); Exeter City (19 October 2024 – 1 March 2025)
- Longest losing run: 11 matches – Exeter City (19 October 2024 – 1 March 2025)
- All statistics correct as of 26 April 2025.

The EFL Youth Alliance also known at times as League 3 is run by the Football League under the auspices of the Football League Youth Alliance. This is for academies that are Category Three and Four in the EPPP. The competition consists of the Under-18 sides from the Category Three and Category Four Academy Clubs of the EFL and Premier League, along with selected National League Clubs. 44 teams competed this season, one fewer than the previous season. Brentford made their return to Category Two status after nine years and left the league before the season. Chesterfield returned after a five-year absence after their first team was promoted. Bromley joined the league as a Category Four Academy after their first team was promoted to the Football League for the first time. However, Oldham Athletic did not return after their parent club lost their EPPP license. For clubs that get relegated to the National League, they have two years to gain promotion back to the EFL. Otherwise, they lose their license with the League. This season there is no more split divisions or Merit Leagues the divisions are combined. All the teams are placed within two Divisions North and South. Afterwards, the regional champions will play in a playoff final to decide the winner.

=== League stage ===
As of match played 10 May 2025

==== North Division ====
Pos	Team	Pld	W	D	L	GF	GA	GD	Pts
1	Bolton Wanderers U18s (R, C)	24	19	3	2	83	25	+58	60
2	Wrexham U18s	24	18	4	2	74	27	+47	58
3	Rotherham United U18s	24	13	5	6	52	39	+13	44
4	Preston North End U18s	24	14	2	8	65	53	+12	44
5	Lincoln City U18s	24	12	5	7	46	36	+10	41
6	Blackpool U18s	24	11	7	6	52	41	+11	40
7	Burton Albion U18s	24	11	6	7	51	37	+14	39
8	Chesterfield U18s	24	12	3	9	41	38	+3	39
9	Port Vale U18s	24	10	5	9	47	42	+5	35
10	Stockport County U18s	24	10	4	10	45	40	+5	34
11	Bradford City U18s	24	9	7	8	45	42	+3	34
12	Grimsby Town U18s	24	9	7	8	42	41	+1	34
13	Mansfield Town U18s	24	11	1	12	36	40	−4	34
14	Accrington Stanley U18s	24	9	5	10	52	60	−8	32
15	Doncaster Rovers U18s	24	9	5	10	32	40	−8	32
16	Rochdale U18s	24	8	6	10	53	55	−2	30
17	Morecambe U18s	24	8	6	10	44	47	−3	30
18	Harrogate Town U18s	24	8	6	10	49	54	−5	30
19	Shrewsbury Town U18s	24	6	8	10	37	46	−9	26
20	Walsall U18s	24	7	5	12	35	47	−12	26
21	Salford City U18s	24	7	4	13	51	69	−18	25
22	Carlisle United U18s	24	6	6	12	28	39	−11	24
23	Hartlepool United U18s	24	4	6	14	38	59	−21	18
24	Notts County U18s	24	4	5	15	29	70	−41	17
25	Huddersfield Town U18s	24	4	1	19	31	71	−40	13

Updated to match(es) played on 10 May 2025. Source: soccerway.com
(C) Champions; (R) Regional League Champions

==== South Division ====
Pos	Team	Pld	W	D	L	GF	GA	GD	Pts
1	Luton Town (R)	27	22	2	3	85	36	+49	68
2	Oxford United	26	20	2	4	72	32	+40	62
3	AFC Wimbledon	27	18	3	6	75	43	+32	57
4	Gillingham	27	17	3	7	73	47	+26	54
5	Plymouth Argyle	26	14	4	8	59	36	+23	46
6	Leyton Orient	27	14	4	9	59	39	+20	46
7	Swindon Town	26	12	3	11	56	50	+6	39
8	Stevenage	27	11	6	10	43	43	0	39
9	Sutton United	27	11	6	10	41	51	−10	39
10	Portsmouth	26	12	1	13	45	54	−9	37
11	Bromley	27	10	7	10	50	51	−1	37
12	Cheltenham Town	26	10	4	12	49	60	−11	34
13	Forest Green Rovers	26	10	1	15	50	58	−8	31
14	Milton Keynes Dons	27	9	4	14	47	54	−7	31
15	Cambridge United	27	7	6	14	50	65	−15	27
16	Bristol Rovers	26	6	3	17	42	72	−30	21
17	Newport County	26	6	2	18	49	75	−26	20
18	Northampton Town	27	6	2	19	39	81	−42	20
19	Exeter City	26	5	1	20	38	75	−37	16

Updated to match(es) played on 3 May 2025. Source: soccerway.com
(R) Regional Champions

==== EFL Youth Alliance National Final ====
9 May 2025
14:00 BST

Bolton Wanderers U18s	7–2	Luton Town U18s
Smith 4'; Lewis 21'; Grayson 25'; Leigh 31'; Lawrence 56', 90'; Chigozie 69' (o.g.)	Report	Takawira 85', 88'

Toughsheet Community Stadium, Horwich

== See also ==
- 2024–25 in English football
