= Bradley Burrowes =

English footballer (born 2008)

Personal information
- Full name: Bradley-Paul Burrowes
- Date of birth: 4 March 2008 (age 18)
- Place of birth: Bristol, England
- Height: 1.69 m (5 ft 7 in)
- Position: Midfielder

Team information
- Current team: Wigan Athletic (on loan from Aston Villa)
- Number: 27

Youth career
- –2021: Bristol Rovers
- 2021–2025: Aston Villa

Senior career*
Years	Team	Apps	(Gls)
2025–	Aston Villa	1	(0)
2026–	→ Wigan Athletic (loan)	4	(1)

International career^{‡}
2024–2025	England U17	14	(0)
2025–	England U18	7	(0)
- * Club domestic league appearances and goals as of 09:53, 14 October 2026 (UTC) ‡ National team caps and goals as of 15:36, 31 March 2026 (UTC)

Bradley-Paul Burrowes (born 4 March 2008) is an English professional footballer who plays as a midfielder for EFL League One club Wigan Athletic on loan from Premier League club Aston Villa.

== Club career ==
=== Aston Villa ===
Burrowes started his career in the Bristol Rovers academy – before being contacted by Aston Villa's academy in 2021 who presented the then 13-year-old Burrowes' family with logistical plans for the move from Bristol to Birmingham. Burrowes officially joined Aston Villa in May that year and worked through the academy levels before signing his first professional contract on 10 March 2025.

Burrowes was part of the Aston Villa U18 team that won the 2024–25 Professional U18 Development League and the 2024–25 FA Youth Cup.

On 31 August 2025, the 17-year-old made his professional debut as a second-half substitute in a Premier League defeat to Crystal Palace.

On 23 March 2026, Burrowes signed a contract extension with Aston Villa.

==== Wigan Athletic (loan) ====
Burrowes joined EFL League One club Wigan Athletic on loan on 1 September 2026.

== International career ==
Burrowes has featured for the England under-17 team. He was included in the squad for the 2025 UEFA European Under-17 Championship. Burrowes started group games against Belgium and Italy.

In August 2025, Burrowes was included in an England U18 squad for the first time. On 3 September 2025, he made his debut for the England U18s in a 3–1 victory over Uzbekistan in the Costa de la Luz U18 International Tournament.

In October 2025, Burrowes was named in the England squad for the 2025 FIFA U-17 World Cup in Qatar. He provided an assist for a goal by Reigan Heskey during the knockout stage victory against South Korea. Burrowes also started their next game as England were eliminated in the round of sixteen by Austria.

== Personal life ==
Burrowes' father, also called Bradley, is a former weightlifter who represented England at the 2014 Commonwealth Games in the Men's 85 kg and who in 2007 broke a British record while competing at the South West Championships.

He was educated at St Mary Redcliffe and Temple School.

== Career statistics ==
=== Club ===
As of match played 10 October 2026

Appearances and goals by club, season and competition
Club	Season	League			FA Cup		EFL Cup		Europe		Other		Total	
Club	Season	Division	Apps	Goals	Apps	Goals	Apps	Goals	Apps	Goals	Apps	Goals	Apps	Goals
Aston Villa U21	2024–25	—			—		—		—		1 (Note: Appearance in EFL Trophy)	0	1	0
Aston Villa U21	2025–26	—			—		—		—		1	0	1	0
Aston Villa	2025–26	Premier League	1	0	0	0	0	0	0	0	—		1	0
Aston Villa	2026–27	Premier League	0	0	0	0	0	0	0	0	—		0	0
Aston Villa	Total		1	0	0	0	0	0	0	0	2	0	3	0
Wigan Athletic (loan)	2026–27	EFL League One	4	0	0	0	—		—		1	0	5	0
Career total			5	0	0	0	0	0	0	0	3	0	8	0

== Honours ==
Aston Villa U18

- FA Youth Cup: 2024–25
- Professional Development League: 2024–25
