= Mason Cotcher =

English association football player

Personal information
- Date of birth: 4 September 2006 (age 20)
- Position: Midfielder

Team information
- Current team: Aston Villa

Youth career
- -2023: Sunderland
- 2024–: Aston Villa

International career
Years	Team	Apps	(Gls)
2023–	England U17	2	(0)

Mason Cotcher (born 4 September 2006) is an English footballer who plays for Aston Villa. He is an England youth international. Cotcher is a product of the Sunderland and Aston Villa academies.

== Career ==
=== Sunderland ===
Cotcher came through the academy at Sunderland from a young age, he featured for their under-18 side, scoring nine goals over the 2022–23 season as they pushed Manchester City U18 close to the league title. He trained with the first-team squad under Tony Mowbray, but did not agree professional terms with the club, although he featured in the Sunderland first-team squad for an FA Cup tie against Shrewsbury Town at the start of 2023. Cotcher left Sunderland on a free transfer in July 2023, opting to not sign a professional contract.

=== Trials ===
In October 2023, Cotcher spent time later in the year on trial at Arsenal, featuring for their under-18 side. In January 2024, it was reported he also had a trial at Manchester United. In February 2024, he started a trial with Leeds United.

=== Aston Villa ===
Cotcher signed for Aston Villa on 12 August 2024.

He scored the second goal during a 6–0 win against Accrington Stanley in the FA Youth Cup on 6 December 2024. He later started in the final of the FA Youth Cup on 5 May 2025, where his team won the title with a 3–1 victory against Manchester City U18s.

== International career ==
Cotcher has featured for the England U17 team.

== Career statistics ==
As of 27 October 2026

Appearances and goals by club, season and competition
Club	Season	League			National cup		League cup		Continental		Other		Total	
Club	Season	Division	Apps	Goals	Apps	Goals	Apps	Goals	Apps	Goals	Apps	Goals	Apps	Goals
Aston Villa	2024–25	Premier League	0	0	0	0	0	0	0	0	3 (Note: Appearances in EFL Trophy)	0	3	0
Aston Villa	2025–26	Premier League	0	0	0	0	0	0	0	0	2	0	2	0
Aston Villa	2026–27	Premier League	0	0	0	0	0	0	0	0	1	0	1	0
Career total			0	0	0	0	0	0	0	0	6	0	6	0

== Honours ==
Aston Villa U18s

- FA Youth Cup: 2024–25
