= Tanil Salik =

Bangladeshi footballer

Personal information
- Full name: Tanil Fahmeed Salik
- Date of birth: 29 September 2006 (age 20)
- Place of birth: London, England
- Positions: Attacking midfielder; right winger

Team information
- Current team: Wealdstone U23

Youth career
- –2019: Tottenham Hotspur
- 2019–2025: Stevenage
- 2025–: Wealdstone

International career^{‡}
Years	Team	Apps	(Gls)
2025–	Bangladesh U23	4	(0)
- ‡ National team caps and goals as of 9 September 2025

Tanil Fahmeed Salik (তানিল ফাহমীদ সালিক; born 29 September 2006) is a professional footballer who plays as a midfielder for the Wealdstone U23. Born in England, he represents the Bangladesh U23 national team.

== Early career ==
Tanil Salik was born on 29 September 2006 in London, England, into a Bangladeshi family from Moulvibazar. He joined Stevenage's academy at under-14 level after being released by Tottenham Hotspur in 2019 and was enrolled in the club’s mentoring scheme. In December 2023, he signed a scholarship with Stevenage, and a month earlier was promoted to the under-18 team, which he represented until his release in January 2025.

== International career ==
After receiving his Bangladeshi passport in early 2025, Tanil was called up to the Bangladesh U23 training camp in August. On 18 August, he made his debut by coming on as a second-half substitute in a friendly match against Bahrain U23, held in Manama, Bahrain, which ended in a 0–1 defeat. He was eventually included in the final squad for the 2026 AFC U-23 Asian Cup qualifiers held in Phú Thọ, Vietnam.
