= Andre Harriman-Annous =

English footballer (born 2007)

Personal information
- Full name: Andre Ryan Harriman-Annous
- Date of birth: 28 December 2007 (age 18)
- Place of birth: Barnet, London, England
- Height: 1.81 m (5 ft 11 in)
- Position: Striker

Team information
- Current team: Arsenal
- Number: 43

Youth career
- 2013–2015: Whetstone Wanderers
- 2015–2016: Tottenham
- 2016–2025: Arsenal

Senior career*
Years	Team	Apps	(Gls)
2025–	Arsenal	0	(0)

International career^{‡}
2025–	England U18	2	(0)
- * Club domestic league appearances and goals as of 30 October 2025 ‡ National team caps and goals as of 30 October 2025

Andre Ryan Harriman-Annous (born 28 December 2007) is an English professional footballer who plays as a striker for Premier League club Arsenal.

== Club career ==
=== Youth ===
Andre Harriman-Annous was born in Barnet, London, to a Nigerian mother and a Ghanaian father. He first played for the local club Whetstone Wanderers aged five–six, before spending a year in the Tottenham pre-academy aged seven. In 2016, he joined the Arsenal academy, where he spent the rest of his youth years in the club he supported growing up.

During the 2023–24 season, Harriman-Annous featured for Arsenal's under-18 team as part of a highly rated generation that included Ethan Nwaneri, Chido Obi, Myles Lewis-Skelly, Jack Porter and Max Dowman. The following season, he appeared and scored in competitions such as the Premier League 2, FA Youth Cup and UEFA Youth League. His performances earned him an opportunity to train with the first team for the first time in February 2025.

=== Senior ===
In the of summer 2025, Harriman-Annous made his senior debut in a pre-season friendly against Newcastle in Singapore. Shortly thereafter, he signed his first pre-professional contract with Arsenal.

He made his professional debut for the club on 29 October 2025, starting in the EFL Cup game against Brighton & Hove Albion along fellow academy graduate Max Dowman, who become the youngest to start for Arsenal. Harriman-Annous played 77 minutes in the 2–0 win against their Premier League opponents. He made his UEFA Champions League debut six days later, as a substitute in a 3–0 win against Slavia Prague.

== International career ==
Reportedly eligible to represent Nigeria through his mother, and Ghana and Lebanon through his father, Harriman-Annous is a youth international for England, first receiving a call with the under-18s in May 2025.

== Style of play ==
Having emerged from the Arsenal academy as a promising striker, he also played as an attacking midfielder and winger earlier in his career.

== Personal life ==
Harriman-Annous's older brother, Brandon, also plays as a footballer in England's lower leagues. His uncle is England rugby and British & Irish Lions's captain Maro Itoje.

== Career statistics ==
=== Club ===
As of match played 27 October 2026

Appearances and goals by club, season and competition
Club	Season	League			FA Cup		EFL Cup		Europe		Other		Total	
Club	Season	Division	Apps	Goals	Apps	Goals	Apps	Goals	Apps	Goals	Apps	Goals	Apps	Goals
Arsenal	2025–26	Premier League	0	0	0	0	1	0	1 (Note: Appearance in UEFA Champions League)	0	—		2	0
Arsenal U21	2026–27	—			—		—		—		2 (Note: Appearance in EFL Trophy)	1	2	1
Career total			0	0	0	0	1	0	1	0	2	1	4	1
