= Louis Zečević-John =

Serbian footballer (born 2008)

Personal information
- Date of birth: 20 January 2008 (age 18)
- Place of birth: London, England
- Height: 1.70 m (5 ft 7 in)
- Positions: Winger; forward

Team information
- Current team: Arsenal
- Number: 80

Youth career
- Arsenal

Senior career*
Years	Team	Apps	(Gls)
2026–	Arsenal	0	(0)

International career^{‡}
2024	Serbia U16	1	(0)
2025	Serbia U17	3	(0)
2026–	Serbia U19	2	(0)
- * Club domestic league appearances and goals ‡ National team caps and goals as of 31 March 2026

Louis Zečević-John (Serbian: Luis Zečević-Džon; Serbian Cyrillic: Луис Зечевић-Џон; born 20 January 2008) is a professional footballer who plays as a winger or forward for Arsenal. Born in England, he is a Serbia youth international.

== Early life ==
Zečević-John was born on 20 January 2008. Born in London, England, he was born to a Serbian mother and an English father. He is of Saint Lucian and Dominica descent through his father.

== Club career ==
As a youth player, Zečević-John joined the youth academy of English Premier League side Arsenal. In 2023, he was promoted to the club's under-18 team.

== International career ==
Zečević-John is a Serbia youth international. During the spring of 2026, he played for the Serbia national under-19 football team for 2026 UEFA European Under-19 Championship qualification.

== Style of play ==
Louis plays as a winger or forward. Serbian news website Mozzart Sport wrote in 2025 that he "offers a profile rarely seen in Serbia. Direct attacker, skilled in one-on-one situations, with exceptional physical predispositions – speed, strength and ability to play through contact. In addition, he is a serious goal threat and very useful in high pressing, often winning balls in the opposition half".
