= Ryan Gray =

Australian rugby league footballer

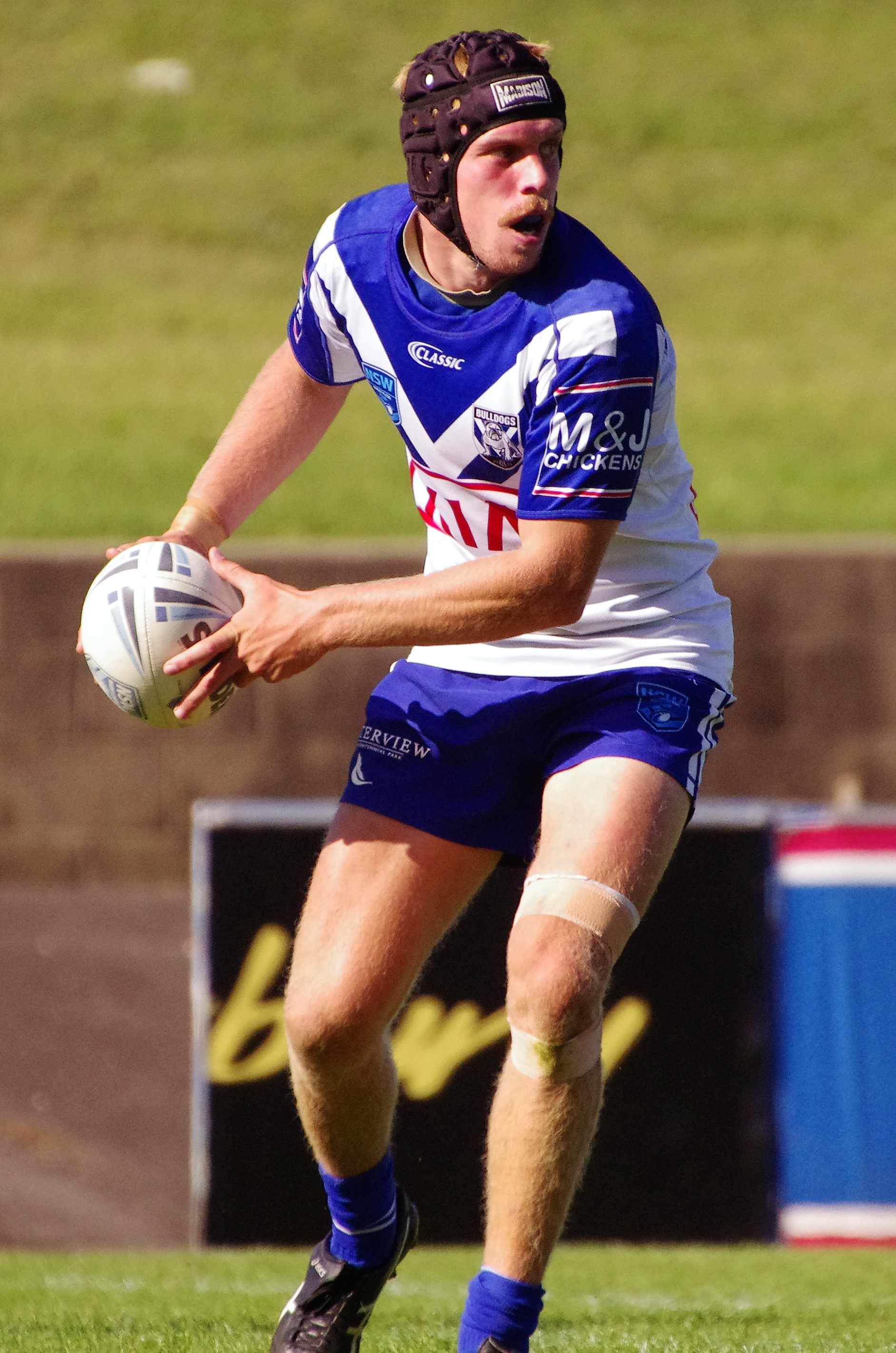

Personal information
- Full name: Ryan Gray
- Born: 7 November 2000 (age 25) Sydney, New South Wales, Australia
- Height: 192 cm (6 ft 4 in)
- Weight: 92 kg (14 st 7 lb)

Playing information
- Position: Hooker
Club
Years	Team	Pld	T	G	FG	P
2025–	South Sydney	5	0	0	0	0
- Source: As of 1 August 2025

Ryan Gray (born 7 November 2000) is an Australian professional rugby league footballer who plays as a hooker for the South Sydney Rabbitohs in the National Rugby League (NRL).

== Early life ==
Gray was born in Sydney, New South Wales, and played his junior rugby league in the Canterbury-Bankstown district. He progressed through the lower grades at the Canterbury-Bankstown Bulldogs, before joining South Sydney in 2024.

== Playing career ==
=== Canterbury-Bankstown Bulldogs ===
Gray played in the NSW Cup for Canterbury from 2020 to 2023, making 34 appearances and scoring five tries.

=== South Sydney Rabbitohs ===
Gray joined the South Sydney Rabbitohs in 2024. He made 36 NSW Cup appearances before making his first grade debut in round 15 of the 2025 NRL season, coming off the bench in a match against Canterbury on 15 June 2025.
