= Ten Acres =

Football ground in Eastleigh, Hampshire, England

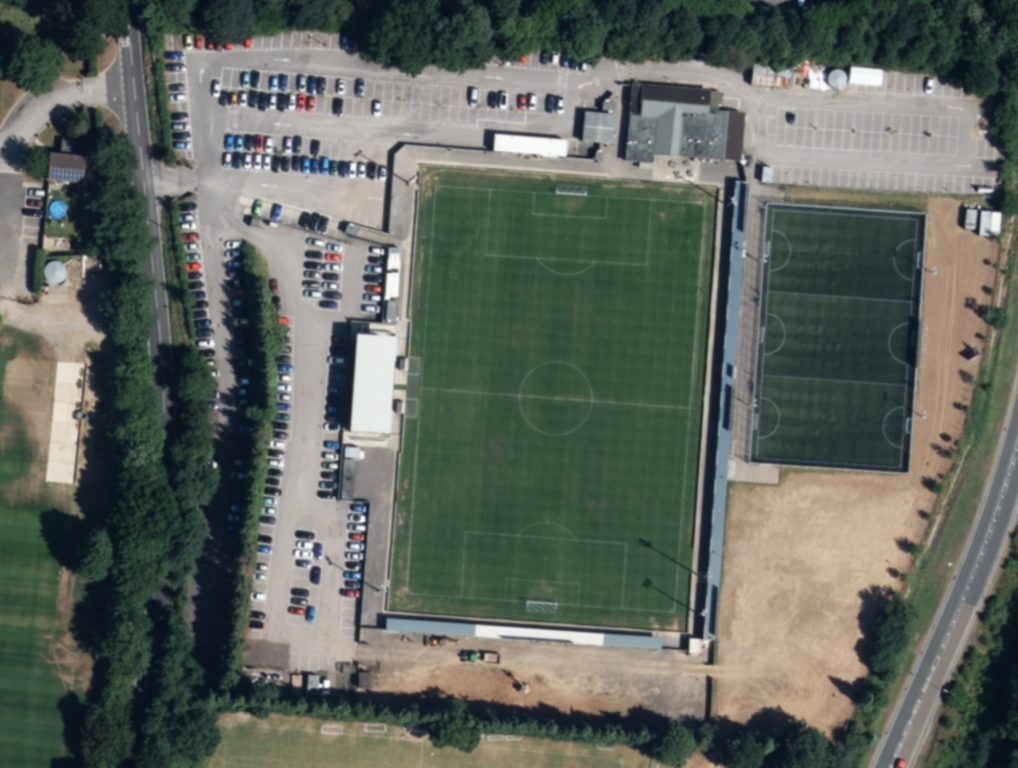
- The stadium from the air prior to the 2014 redevelopment
- Interactive map of Ten Acres
- Full name: Silverlake Stadium
- Location: Eastleigh, Hampshire, England
- Coordinates: 50°57′08″N 1°22′18″W
- Owner: Eastleigh F.C.
- Capacity: 5,192 (2,700 seated)
- Surface: Grass
- Record attendance: 5,075 (Eastleigh F.C. v Newport County, 16 January 2024)

Construction
- Opened: 1957

Tenants
- Eastleigh F.C. Southampton Women (2024–)

Ten Acres, known as the Silverlake Stadium for sponsorship purposes, is a football ground in Eastleigh, Hampshire, England. It has been the home of Eastleigh F.C. since 1957 when they moved from Walnut Avenue. The ground's record attendance is 5,075 for an FA Cup third round match against Newport County on 16 January 2024.

== History ==
Eastleigh moved to Ten Acres in 1957 from their previous ground Walnut Avenue. In 1976 floodlights were installed.

In 2004, following promotion to the Isthmian League, the old wooden stand was knocked down and a new 352-seat grandstand was built on the halfway line, stretching for just under a third of the pitch. Behind the motorway end hard standing was hard standing with a cover, this was named the Silverlake Stand. In 2006, the roof was widened across the Silverlake Stand to cover the whole width of the pitch.

Until 2006, the area opposite the grandstand was just hard standing backing into a tall fir trees. During the summer of 2006, a metal back and roof were added, along with an electronic scoreboard on the roof which was the Premier Telecom stand.

In 2009, 150 seats were added to the middle of the Silverlake Stand to give Eastleigh the necessary ground grading to compete in the Conference South playoffs.

On 20 December 2012, concerning the situation regarding the stadium, the club announced that an offer had previously been made to the board at ‘Ten Acre Holdings’ (the current owners). Following discussions the board of Ten Acre Holdings felt that they were willing to accept the offer presented to them as long as the remaining shareholders also felt a desire to sell the ground at this stage. On this basis a full shareholders meeting was called and the outcome was that a clear large majority were in favour of accepting the offer and that the sale of the freehold should progress.

Ten Acre Holdings had been set up to safeguard the club and enable it to get back on a sound financial footing, which it has achieved over recent years. The proposed purchase was intended to provide the football club with the strongest possible opportunity to continue its progression.

The ground was, again, extensively redeveloped during 2014. New pitch side fencing was installed following damage to the previous fencing during Eastleighs championship winning game against Basingstoke. The former East stand at Sandy Park (home of Exeter Chiefs RFC) was rebuilt along the premier telecom side of the ground as well as behind the clubhouse goal providing a covered terraced accommodation for 2,000 spectators. On 2 December 2014, the newly completed 2,290-seater South Stand was opened for the first time in a Conference Premier game against Dartford with the club allowing spectators in for free to celebrate the occasion. The Mackoy Community Stand was officially opened on 28 February 2015 with a club and stadium record attendance of 4,126 for a conference premier match against Macclesfield, a live match on BT sport that Eastleigh won 4–0.

The attendance record was broken a year later when 5,025 watched the club's FA Cup third round match against Bolton.

During 2016–17 season work began on a double story building behind the goal to allow for Eastlegh FC to cater for its increased fanbase.

The stand behind the clubhouse goal is known as the Shed End and is the main area where the club's most vocal supporters gather.

== Top 10 crowds at Ten Acres ==
1. 5,075 (Jan 16 2024 Newport County)
2. 5,025 (Jan 9 2016 Bolton)
3. 5,002 (December 3 2023 Reading)
4. 4,554 (Feb 11 2024 Manchester United Women)
5. 4,126 (Feb 28 2015 Macclesfield)
6. 4,114 (Oct 4 2016 Maidstone)
7. 4,024 (April 25, 2015 Kidderminster)
8. 3,986 (December 10, 2022 Wrexham)
9. 3,553 (April 10, 2023 Aldershot)
10. 3,499 (May 15, 2022 Grimsby)
- Groundhopping.de page

== International Games ==
8 April 2022 Centenary Shield	England (Schoolboys)	1–1	Ireland (Schoolboys)	Eastleigh, England
19:00 BST		Report		Stadium: Silverlake Stadium; Attendance: 1,071
