= Cole Brannigan =

Northern Irish association football player (born 2007)

Personal information
- Date of birth: 12 May 2007 (age 19)
- Position: Forward

Team information
- Current team: Aston Villa
- Number: 60

Youth career
- –2023: Linfield
- 2023-: Aston Villa

Senior career*
Years	Team	Apps	(Gls)
2025-	Aston Villa	0	(0)

International career
2025-	Northern Ireland U21	1	(0)
- * Club domestic league appearances and goals as of 00:15 (UTC) 23 November 2025

Cole Brannigan (born 12 May 2007) is a Northern Irish professional footballer who plays for Premier League club Aston Villa. He is a Northern Ireland U21 international.

== Club career ==
He played for Linfield in Northern Ireland prior to joining Aston Villa in 2023. He signed his first professional contract with the club the following summer, and made his debut in Premier League 2 in February 2025. He featured for the club in the UEFA Youth League and EFL Trophy. In May 2025, he scored in the final as Aston Villa U18 defeated Man City U18 3-1 to win the FA Youth Cup. He signed a new contract with the club in March 2026.

== International career ==
Brannigan played for Northern Ireland U21 against Germany U21 on 14 October 2025, appearing as a second-half substitute in a 2-1 defeat.
