= FA Youth Cup Finals =

List of English football matches

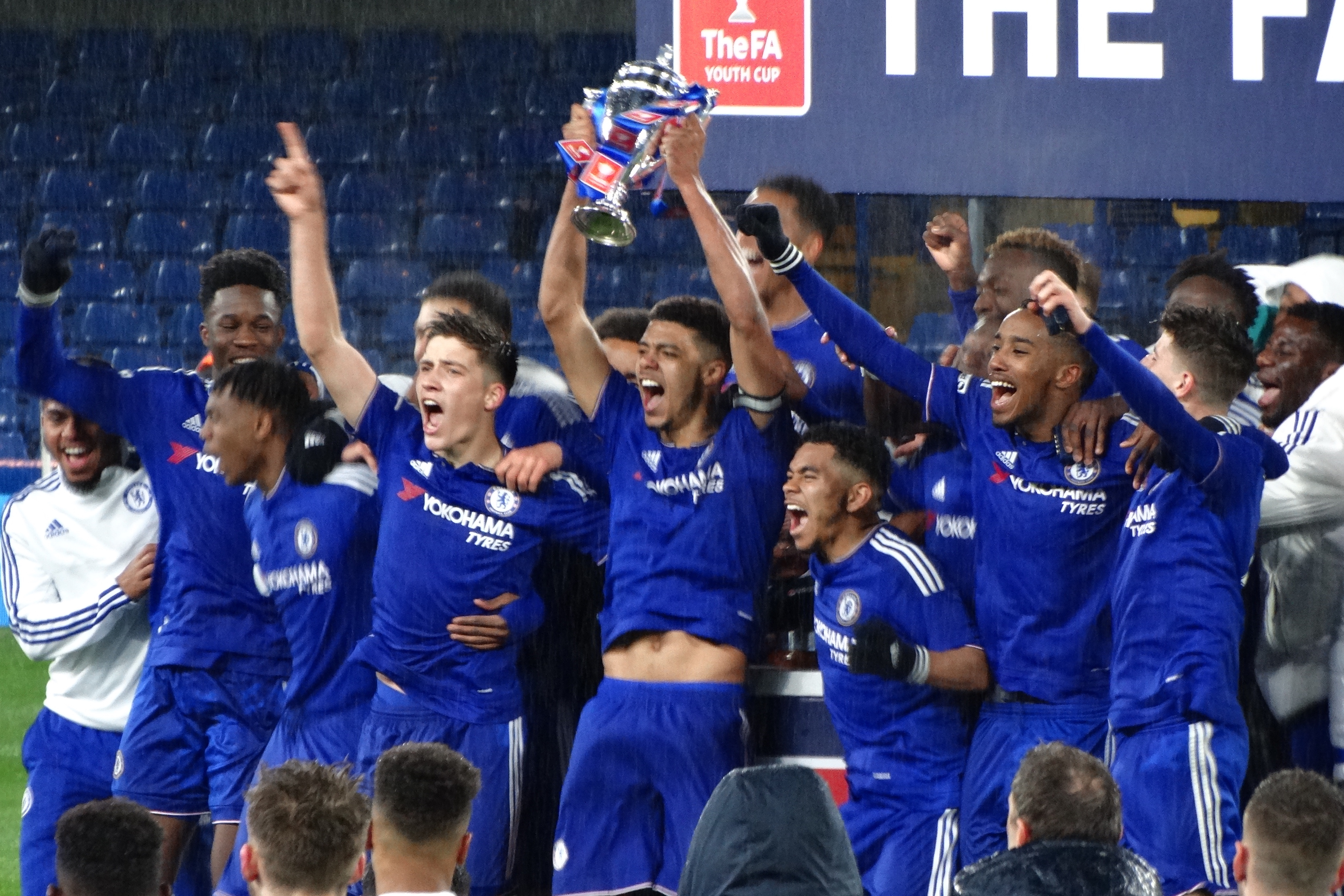
Chelsea players celebrating winning the 2015–16 FA Youth Cup.

This article lists results and squads for the finals of the FA Youth Cup.

== 2019–20: Manchester City 3–2 Chelsea ==
2 November 2020
19:30

Manchester City	3–2	Chelsea
McAtee 37'; Rogers 52'; Palmer 83'	Report	Lewis 28'; Harwood-Bellis 60' (o.g.)

St George's Park
Referee: Geoff Eltringham

Note: Flags indicate national team as defined under FIFA eligibility rules; some limited exceptions apply. Players may hold more than one non-FIFA nationality.

Manchester City
No.	Pos.	Nation	Player
1	GK	SCO	Cieran Slicker
2	DF	ENG	CJ Egan-Riley
3	DF	ENG	Taylor Harwood-Bellis
4	DF	ENG	Luke Mbete-Tabu
5	DF	SEN	Alpha Diounkou
6	MF	IRL	Joe Hodge
7	FW	ENG	Cole Palmer
8	MF	ENG	Tommy Doyle
9	FW	ENG	Liam Delap
10	MF	ENG	James McAtee (substituted off) 87'
11	FW	ENG	Morgan Rogers (substituted off) 76'
Substitutes:
12	DF	ENG	Finley Burns
13	GK	ENG	Josh McNamara
14	MF	AUS	Alex Robertson (substituted on) 87'
15	FW	ENG	Sam Edozie
16	MF	ENG	Ben Knight
17	FW	NED	Jayden Braaf (substituted on) 76'
18	FW	NOR	Oscar Bobb
Coach: (Spain) Carlos Vicens

Chelsea
No.	Pos.	Nation	Player
1	GK	FIN	Lucas Bergström
2	DF	ENG	Valentino Livramento
3	DF	ENG	Henry Lawrence
4	DF	ENG	Dynel Simeu
5	DF	ENG	Levi Colwill
6	MF	ENG	Lewis Bate
7	MF	ENG	Myles Peart-Harris
8	MF	CMR	Ben Elliott (substituted off) 46'
9	FW	NOR	Bryan Fiabema (substituted off) 61'
10	MF	ENG	Marcel Lewis
11	DF	ENG	Dion Rankine
Substitutes:
12	DF	ENG	Bashir Humphreys
13	GK	ENG	Jake Askew
14	FW	ENG	Tino Anjorin (substituted on) 46'
15	MF	AUT	Thierno Ballo (substituted on) 61'
16	MF	ENG	Charlie Webster
17	MF	IRL	Harvey Vale
18	FW	THA	Jude Soonsup-Bell
Coach: (England) Ed Brand

== 2020–21: Aston Villa 2–1 Liverpool ==
25 May 2021
19:45

Aston Villa	2–1	Liverpool
Chrisene 8'; Young 12' (pen.)	Report	Frauendorf 73'

Villa Park
Attendance: 4,406

Note: Flags indicate national team as defined under FIFA eligibility rules; some limited exceptions apply. Players may hold more than one non-FIFA nationality.

Aston Villa
No.	Pos.	Nation	Player
1	GK	ENG	Filip Marschall
2	DF	ENG	Kaine Kesler Hayden
3	DF	ENG	Sebastian Revan
4	DF	NED	Lamare Bogarde
5	DF	NED	Sil Swinkels
6	MF	ENG	Hayden Lindley (substituted off) 79'
7	MF	ENG	Ben Chrisene (substituted off) 60'
8	MF	ENG	Arjan Raikhy
9	FW	ENG	Brad Young
10	MF	AUT	Carney Chukwuemeka
11	FW	ENG	Louie Barry
Substitutes:
12	MF	ENG	Aaron Ramsey (substituted on) 60'
13	GK	POL	Oliwier Zych
14	MF	NED	Paul Appiah
15	MF	ESP	Mamadou Sylla (substituted on) 79'
16	FW	ENG	Dewain Sewell
17	MF	IRL	Tommi O'Reilly
18	FW	ENG	Kahrel Reddin
Coach: (England) Sean Verity

Liverpool
No.	Pos.	Nation	Player
1	GK	ENG	Harvey Davies
2	DF	NIR	Conor Bradley
3	DF	ENG	James Norris
4	DF	ENG	Jarell Quansah
5	DF	FRA	Billy Koumetio
6	MF	ENG	Luca Stephenson
7	MF	ENG	Dominic Corness (substituted off) 46'
8	MF	ENG	Tyler Morton
9	FW	ENG	Max Woltman
10	MF	ENG	James Balagizi
11	FW	POL	Mateusz Musiałowski
Substitutes:
12	DF	ENG	Lee Jonas
13	GK	POL	Fabian Mrozek
14	DF	ENG	Sean Wilson
15	DF	ENG	Luke Chambers
16	MF	GER	Melkamu Frauendorf (substituted on) 46'
17	MF	ENG	Isaac Mabaya
18	DF	ESP	Stefan Bajcetic
Coach: (England) Marc Bridge-Wilkinson

== 2021–22: Manchester United 3–1 Nottingham Forest ==
11 May 2022
19:45

Manchester United	3–1	Nottingham Forest
Bennett 13'; Garnacho 78', 90+4'	Report	Powell 43'

Old Trafford
Attendance: 67,492

Note: Flags indicate national team as defined under FIFA eligibility rules; some limited exceptions apply. Players may hold more than one non-FIFA nationality.

Manchester United
No.	Pos.	Nation	Player
1	GK	CZE	Radek Vitek
2	DF	ESP	Marc Jurado
3	DF	ENG	Sam Murray
4	DF	SCO	Louis Jackson
5	DF	ENG	Rhys Bennett
6	MF	ENG	Kobbie Mainoo
7	MF	ENG	Sam Mather (substituted off) 86'
8	MF	ENG	Dan Gore
9	FW	ENG	Charlie McNeill (substituted off) 64'
10	MF	NOR	Isak Hansen-Aarøen (substituted off) 64'
11	FW	ARG	Alejandro Garnacho
Substitutes:
12	DF	ENG	Logan Pye
13	GK	ENG	Tom Wooster
14	MF	ENG	Omari Forson
15	DF	ENG	Sonny Aljofree (substituted on) 86'
16	MF	POL	Maxi Oyedele (substituted on) 64'
17	FW	ENG	Joe Hugill (substituted on) 64'
18	MF	ENG	Ethan Ennis
Coach: (Republic of Ireland) Travis Binnion

Nottingham Forest
No.	Pos.	Nation	Player
1	GK	ENG	Aaron Bott
2	DF	ENG	Zach Abbott
3	MF	ENG	Kyle McAdam
4	DF	WAL	Ben Hammond
5	DF	ENG	Pharrell Johnson
6	DF	WAL	Justin Hanks (substituted off) 81'
7	MF	ENG	Joshua Powell
8	MF	NIR	Jamie McDonnell (substituted off) 90+1'
9	FW	ENG	Detlef Esapa Osong
10	FW	NIR	Dale Taylor
11	MF	WAL	Sam Collins (substituted off) 73'
Substitutes:
12	GK	ENG	Alex Akers
13	MF	ENG	Ben Perry (substituted on) 73'
14	MF	ENG	Jack Perkins
15	DF	WAL	Jack Thompson
16	FW	IRL	Joe Gardner (substituted on) 81'
17	FW	ENG	Jack Nadin
18	MF	ENG	Aaron Korpal (substituted on) 90+1'
Coach: (England) Warren Joyce

== 2022–23: Arsenal 1–5 West Ham United ==
25 April 2023
19:00

Arsenal	1–5	West Ham United
Benjamin 7'	Report	Earthy 16'; Marshall 18'; Kodua 42'; Casey 78'; Briggs 90'

Emirates Stadium
Attendance: 34,127
Referee: David Webb

Note: Flags indicate national team as defined under FIFA eligibility rules; some limited exceptions apply. Players may hold more than one non-FIFA nationality.

Arsenal
No.	Pos.	Nation	Player
1	GK	JAM	Noah Cooper
2	DF	POL	Michał Rosiak
3	DF	ENG	Lino Sousa
4	DF	ENG	Josh Robinson
5	DF	ENG	Reuell Walters
6	MF	ENG	Bradley Ibrahim
7	MF	ENG	Amario Cozier-Duberry
8	MF	ENG	Myles Lewis-Skelly
9	FW	ENG	Ethan Nwaneri
10	MF	ENG	Jimi Gower (substituted off) 46'
11	FW	WAL	Omari Benjamin (substituted off) 85'
Substitutes:
12	DF	ENG	Josh Nichols
13	GK	COL	Alexei Rojas
14	DF	ENG	Luis Brown
15	FW	SLE	Osman Kamara (substituted on) 46'
16	MF	MAR	Ismail Oulad M'Hand
17	FW	ENG	Sebastian Ferdinand (substituted on) 85'
18	DF	ALB	Maldini Kacurri
Coach: (England) Jack Wilshere

West Ham United
No.	Pos.	Nation	Player
1	GK	ENG	Mason Terry
2	DF	ENG	Ryan Battrum (substituted off) 90'
3	MF	ENG	Oliver Scarles
4	DF	ENG	Lewis Orford
5	DF	ENG	Regan Clayton
6	DF	ENG	Kaelan Casey (substituted off) 85'
7	MF	NIR	Patrick Kelly
8	MF	ENG	George Earthy
9	FW	NIR	Callum Marshall
10	FW	ENG	Gideon Kodua
11	FW	ENG	Divin Mubama
Substitutes:
12	DF	ENG	Sean Tarima
13	GK	ENG	Finlay Herrick
14	MF	ENG	Daniel Rigge (substituted on) 85'
15	MF	ENG	Favour Fawunmi
16	DF	NIR	Josh Briggs (substituted on) 90'
17	MF	ENG	Divine Mukasa
18	FW	ENG	Liam Jones
Coach: (England) Kevin Keen

== 2023–24: Manchester City 4–0 Leeds United ==
10 May 2024
19:00

Manchester City	4–0	Leeds United
Oboavwoduo 47'; Heskey 59'; Mfuni 70'; Warhurst 82'	Report

City of Manchester Stadium, Manchester
Attendance: 20,000
Referee: Dean Whitestone

Note: Flags indicate national team as defined under FIFA eligibility rules; some limited exceptions apply. Players may hold more than one non-FIFA nationality.

Manchester City
No.	Pos.	Nation	Player
1	GK	ENG	True Grant
2	DF	ENG	Matthew Henderson-Hall
3	DF	ENG	Jahmai Simpson-Pusey
4	DF	ENG	Kian Noble
5	DF	ENG	Stephen Mfuni (substituted off) 85'
6	MF	ENG	Charlie Cray
7	FW	GER	Farid Alfa-Ruprecht
8	FW	ENG	Justin Oboavwoduo (substituted off) 73'
9	FW	ENG	Jaden Heskey
10	MF	ENG	Divine Mukasa (substituted off) 73'
11	FW	ENG	Joel Ndala
Substitutes:
12	DF	ENG	Seb Naylor (substituted on) 85'
13	GK	ENG	Jack Wint
14	MF	HUN	Michael Okeke (substituted on) 73'
15	MF	ENG	Oluwafemi Fapetu
16	FW	ENG	Christian Dunbar-McDonald
17	FW	ENG	Luca Fletcher
18	FW	ENG	Matthew Warhurst (substituted on) 73'
Coach: (England) Ben Wilkinson

Leeds United
No.	Pos.	Nation	Player
1	GK	SCO	Rory Mahady
2	MF	ENG	Joseph Richards
3	DF	ENG	Dan Toulson
4	MF	WAL	Charlie Crew
5	DF	ENG	Alfie Cresswell
6	MF	ENG	Reuben Lopata-White
7	FW	ENG	Harvey Vincent (substituted off) 80'
8	DF	ENG	Rhys Chadwick
9	FW	ENG	Freddie Lane (substituted off) 60'
10	MF	SCO	Sam Chambers
11	FW	SCO	Josh McDonald
Substitutes:
12	DF	ENG	Joe Billett
13	GK	NIR	Owen Grainger
14	DF	ENG	Coban Bird
15	MF	ENG	Oliver Pickles
16	MF	ENG	Connor Douglas (substituted on) 60'
17	MF	SCO	Devon Brockie (substituted on) 80'
18	FW	ENG	Lleyton Brown
Coach: (England) Rob Etherington

== 2024–25: Aston Villa 3–1 Manchester City ==
5 May 2025
15:00

Aston Villa	3–1	Manchester City
Carroll 4'; Brannigan 31'; Jimoh-Aloba 65'	Report	Warhurst 2'

Villa Park, Birmingham
Attendance: 25,073
Referee: Gavin Ward

Note: Flags indicate national team as defined under FIFA eligibility rules; some limited exceptions apply. Players may hold more than one non-FIFA nationality.

Aston Villa
No.	Pos.	Nation	Player
1	GK	ENG	Sam Proctor
2	DF	ENG	Triston Rowe
3	DF	POR	Rodrigo Fortes (substituted off) 80'
4	DF	ENG	TJ Carroll
5	DF	ENG	Leon Routh
6	MF	SCO	Aidan Borland
7	MF	ENG	Bradley Burrowes (substituted off) 90+2'
8	MF	ENG	George Hemmings
9	FW	ENG	Mason Cotcher (substituted off) 87'
10	MF	ENG	Jamaldeen Jimoh-Aloba (substituted off) 80'
11	MF	NIR	Cole Brannigan (substituted off) 72'
Substitutes:
12	DF	ENG	Ashton McWilliams (substituted on) 80'
13	GK	ENG	Owen Asemota
14	MF	IRL	Keilan Quinn (substituted on) 72'
15	MF	ENG	Max Jenner (substituted on) 87'
16	FW	IRL	Alfie Lynskey
17	DF	ENG	Teddie Bloomfield (substituted on) 80'
18	MF	ENG	Trai-Varn Mulley (substituted on) 90+2'
Coach: (England) Jimmy Shan

Manchester City
No.	Pos.	Nation	Player
1	GK	ENG	Oliver Whatmuff
2	DF	ENG	Harrison Parker
3	DF	ENG	Kian Noble
4	DF	ENG	Stephen Mfuni
5	DF	ENG	Kaden Braithwaite
6	MF	ENG	Harrison Miles (substituted off) 71'
7	FW	ENG	Christian Dunbar-McDonald (substituted off) 46'
8	MF	ENG	Finlay Gorman (substituted off) 66'
9	FW	ENG	Matthew Warhurst
10	MF	ENG	Divine Mukasa
11	FW	ENG	Reigan Heskey
Substitutes:
12	FW	ENG	Luca Fletcher
13	GK	WAL	Max Hudson
14	FW	ENG	Kylan Midwood
15	MF	GER	Floyd Samba (substituted on) 66'
16	DF	ENG	Leke Drake
17	DF	WAL	Rhys Thomas (substituted on) 71'
18	DF	ENG	Matthew Henderson-Hall (substituted on) 46'
Coach: (Germany) Oliver Reiss

== 2025–26: Manchester City 2–1 Manchester United ==
14 May 2026
19:00

Manchester City	2–1	Manchester United
Samba 40'; Heskey 87'	Report	Kukonki 42'

Joie Stadium, Manchester
Attendance: 4,380

Note: Flags indicate national team as defined under FIFA eligibility rules; some limited exceptions apply. Players may hold more than one non-FIFA nationality.

Manchester City
No.	Pos.	Nation	Player
1	GK	WAL	Max Hudson
2	DF	ENG	Dante Headley
3	DF	ENG	Leke Drake
4	DF	ENG	Kaden Braithwaite
5	DF	ENG	Jake Wain
6	MF	ENG	Harrison Miles
7	FW	ENG	Ryan McAidoo
8	MF	GER	Floyd Samba
9	FW	ENG	Teddie Lamb
10	FW	ENG	Tyrone Samba (substituted off) 69'
11	FW	ENG	Reigan Heskey
Substitutes:
12	GK	SCO	Ben Vickery
13	DF	ENG	Charlie Courtman
14	DF	ENG	Oliver Tevenan
15	MF	ENG	Finley Gorman (substituted on) 69'
16	MF	ENG	Karim Cassim
17	MF	ENG	Xavier Parker
18	FW	ENG	Kylan Midwood
Coach: (Germany) Oliver Reiss

Manchester United
No.	Pos.	Nation	Player
1	GK	ENG	Cameron Byrne-Hughes (substituted off) 79'
2	DF	ENG	Yuel Helafu
3	DF	SCO	Daniel Armer
4	DF	ENG	Albert Mills
5	DF	ENG	Godwill Kukonki (substituted off) 90'
6	DF	ENG	Rafe McCormack (substituted off) 46'
7	FW	RUS	Amir Ibragimov
8	MF	ENG	Jim Thwaites
9	FW	ENG	JJ Gabriel
10	FW	DEN	Chido Obi
11	FW	GER	Noah Ajayi (substituted off) 90'
Substitutes:
12	DF	AUS	James Overy (substituted on) 79'
13	GK	ENG	Fred Heath
14	DF	ENG	Dante Plunkett (substituted on) 90'
15	FW	ENG	Nathaniel-Junior Brown (substituted on) 46'
16	MF	IRL	Jay McEvoy
17	FW	SVK	Samuel Lusale (substituted on) 90'
18	FW	ENG	Louie Kynaston-Bradbury
Coach: (Scotland) Darren Fletcher
