= 2025–26 FA Youth Cup =

Tournament details
- Teams: 535

Final positions
- Champions: Manchester City (5th Title)
- Runners-up: Manchester United (5th Runners Up)

Tournament statistics
- Top goal scorer(s): (England) Valentin Joseph (Blackburn Rovers) (9 goals)

The 2025–26 FA Youth Cup is the 74th edition of the FA Youth Cup, an annual knockout football competition in domestic English football run by The Football Association for under-18 sides.

The competition consists of several rounds and was preceded by a qualifying competition, starting with one preliminary round which was followed by three qualifying rounds for non-League teams. The Football League teams entered the draw thereafter, with League One and League Two teams entered in the first round proper, and Premier League and Championship teams entered in the third round proper.

A total of 535 clubs were accepted into the competition almost 100 less than last year's competition although this is because 10th tier clubs are no longer eligible for the competition. The defending champions are Aston Villa who defeated Manchester City 3–1 at Villa Park. They were eliminated in the quarter-finals by Crystal Palace.

== Calendar ==
| Round | Matches played from | Matches | Clubs | New entries |
|---|---|---|---|---|
| Preliminary round | 1 September 2025 | 188 | 535 → 347 | 380 |
| First round qualifying | 15 September 2025 | 118 | 347 → 229 | 44 |
| Second round qualifying | 29 September 2025 | 70 | 229 → 159 | 22 |
| Third round qualifying | 13 October 2025 | 35 | 159 → 124 | |
| First round | 1 November 2025 | 40 | 124 → 84 | 45 |
| Second round | 22 November 2025 | 20 | 84 → 64 | |
| Third round | 13 December 2025 | 32 | 64 → 32 | 44 |
| Fourth round | 24 January 2026 | 16 | 32 → 16 | |
| Fifth round | 21 February 2026 | 8 | 16 → 8 | |
| Quarter-finals | 14 March 2026 | 4 | 8 → 4 | |
| Semi-finals | 11 April 2026 | 2 | 4 → 2 | |
| Final | 9 May 2026 | 1 | 2 → 1 | |

== Qualifying rounds ==
=== Preliminary round ===
380 teams from the 7th to 9th tiers entered in this round. Four clubs got a bye into the First Qualifying Round; Blyth Spartans (8), Chasetown (8), Colney Heath (9), and Dereham Town (9).

Before the competition began there were 11 walkovers, as Downton, Farsley Celtic, Fleet Town, Grimsby Borough, Hythe Town, Kettering Town, Padiham, Pagham, Redhill, Uttoxeter Town, and Whitehawk all left the competition. The draw was done on 4 July 2025, alongside the First Qualifying Round.

Number of teams per tier still in competition
| National League (Note: National League joined the competition in the Second Qualifying Round.) | National League North and South (Note: National League North and National League South joined the competition in the First Qualifying Round.) | Premier Division | Division One | Regional | Total |
|---|---|---|---|---|---|
| 22 / 22 | 44 / 44 | 75 / 75 | 124 / 124 | 181 / 181 | 446 / 446 |

| Tie | Home team (tier) | Score | Away team (tier) | Att. |
|---|---|---|---|---|
Monday 1 September 2025
| 11 | Padiham (9) | W/O | Abbey Hey (9) | NA |
| 25 | Golcar United (9) | W/O | Farsley Celtic (9) | NA |
| 28 | Grimsby Borough (8) | W/O | Cleethorpes Town (7) | NA |
| 62 | Kettering Town (7) | W/O | Crawley Green (9) | NA |
| 121 | Hythe Town (9) | W/O | Folkestone Invicta (7) | NA |
| 132 | Pagham (9) | W/O | Merstham (8) | NA |
| 134 | Redhill (9) | W/O | Westfield (8) | NA |
| 140 | Whitehawk (7) | W/O | Badshot Lea (9) | NA |
| 165 | Hamble Club (9) | W/O | Downton (9) | NA |
| 6 | Morpeth Town (7) | 3–3 (4–3 p) | Lancaster City (7) | |
| 41 | Grantham Town (9) | 3–1 | Hinckley AFC (9) | 75 |
| 111 | Hanwell Town (7) | 2–5 | Hayes & Yeading United (8) | 80 |
| 146 | Carshalton Athletic (7) | 6–0 | East Grinstead Town (8) | |
| 181 | Taunton Town (7) | 11–0 | Thornbury Town (9) | 130 |
| 184 | Westbury United (8) | 0–7 | Swindon Supermarine (8) | |
| 4 | Pickering Town (9) | 2–7 | Boro Rangers (9) | |
| 38 | Ashby Ivanhoe (9) | 5–2 | Stamford (7) | 134 |
| 54 | Nantwich Town (8) | 5–1 | Lichfield City (8) | 128 |
| 56 | Whitchurch Alport (9) | 9–1 | Dudley Town (9) | |
| 92 | Bowers & Pitsea (8) | 0–3 | Bishop's Stortford (7) | 167 |
| 128 | Ramsgate (7) | A–A | Deal Town (8) | |
| 172 | Bridgwater United (9) | 0–1 | Paulton Rovers (9) | 67 |
| 174 | Hallen (9) | 5–0 | Bristol Manor Farm (8) | 80 |
| 182 | Clevedon Town (9) | 3–3 (3–5 p) | Brislington (9) | 101 |
| 186 | St Blazey (9) | 3–0 | Falmouth Town (8) | 90 |
| 188 | Willand Rovers (8) | 2–3 | AFC St Austell (9) | |
| 33 | Basford United (8) | 1–8 | Harborough Town (7) | |
| 35 | Spalding United (7) | 2–1 | GNG Oadby Town (9) | |
Match played at GNG Oadby Town
| 42 | Corby Town (8) | 1–4 | Loughborough Students (8) | |
| 44 | Tividale (9) | 2–2 (1–3 p) | Lye Town (9) | |
| 45 | Rushall Olympic (7) | 7–0 | Malvern Town (8) | |
| 50 | Worcester Raiders (9) | 2–1 | Sporting Club Inkberrow (8) | 105 |
| 53 | Stratford Town (7) | 2–4 | Stourport Swifts (9) | 122 |
| 55 | Boldmere St Michaels (8) | W/O | Uttoxeter Town (9) | |
| 60 | Rugby Borough (8) | 2–2 (1–3 p) | Pershore Town (9) | 39 |
| 102 | Hackney Wick (9) | 3–1 | Hashtag United (7) | |
| 113 | North Greenford United (9) | 0–4 | Beaconsfield Town (8) | 54 |
| 114 | Burnham (9) | 3–3 (6–7 p) | Edgware & Kingsbury (9) | 74 |
| 123 | Dulwich Hamlet (7) | 6–1 | Rusthall (9) | 131 |
| 129 | Peacehaven & Telscombe (9) | 1–1 (2–4 p) | Eastbourne Town (8) | 159 |
| 130 | Newhaven (9) | 2–3 | Horsham YM (9) | |
| 136 | Kingstonian (8) | 4–2 | South Park (Reigate) (8) | 96 |
| 150 | Tooting & Mitcham United (9) | 3–2 | Broadbridge Heath (8) | 48 |
| 156 | Abingdon United (9) | W/O | Fleet Town (9) | NA |
| 159 | Thatcham Town (9) | 7–1 | Wallingford & Crowmarsh (9) | 118 |
Tuesday 2 September 2025
| 32 | Anstey Nomads (8) | 2–0 | Lincoln United (8) | |
| 124 | Erith Town (8) | 8–0 | Punjab United (9) | 134 |
| 141 | Shoreham (9) | P–P | Horley Town (9) | |
| 160 | Ardley United (9) | 3–6 | Binfield (8) | |
| 12 | Cheadle Town (9) | 2–3 | FC United of Manchester (7) | 69 |
| 22 | North Ferriby (8) | 6–0 | Eccleshill United (9) | |
| 48 | Worcester City (7) | 1–1 (4–3 p) | Bedworth United (8) | |
| 70 | March Town United (9) | 1–4 | St Ives Town (7) | |
Match played at St Ives Town
| 71 | AFC Dunstable (8) | 4–2 | Harpenden Town (9) | |
Match played at Harpenden Town
| 75 | Great Yarmouth Town (9) | 0–3 | Fakenham Town (9) | |
| 79 | Soham Town Rangers (9) | 1–3 | Heacham (9) | 78 |
| 86 | Walsham Le Willows (9) | 0–2 | Mulbarton Wanderers (9) | 61 |
| 112 | Hanworth Villa (8) | 2–1 | Bedfont Sports Club (8) | |
| 116 | Sutton Athletic (9) | 3–1 | Phoenix Sports (9) | 30 |
| 118 | Margate (8) | 5–2 | AFC Croydon Athletic (8) | |
| 145 | Jersey Bulls (8) | 10–2 | Ascot United (8) | |
Match played at Ascot United
| 151 | Burgess Hill Town (7) | 7–0 | Cobham (9) | 54 |
Match played at Cobham
| 157 | Reading City (9) | 3–3 (3–5 p) | Basingstoke Town (7) | |
| 161 | Moneyfields (8) | 1–2 | Winchester City (8) | |
| 166 | Weymouth (7) | 1–2 | Bournemouth Poppies (9) | |
| 176 | Bishop's Cleeve (8) | 2–4 | Melksham Town (8) | |
| 177 | Cirencester Town (9) | 5–0 | Cinderford Town (9) | 53 |
| 43 | Sherwood Colliery (9) | 2–2 (3–4 p) | Blackstones (9) | |
Wednesday 3 September 2025
| 3 | Newcastle Benfield (9) | 5–1 | Consett (8) | 110 |
| 15 | Warrington Town (7) | 0–5 | Stockport Town (9) | 139 |
| 24 | Bridlington Town (8) | 1–3 | Osset United (8) | |
| 31 | Bradford (Park Avenue) (8) | 5–1 | Garforth Town (8) | 88 |
| 64 | Hitchin Town (8) | 1–3 | Milton Keynes Irish (8) | 54 |
| 163 | AFC Portchester (8) | 3–3 (6–5 p) | Wimborne Town (7) | 71 |
| 169 | Hamworthy Recreation (9) | 5–2 | Poole Town (7) | 69 |
| 180 | Street (9) | 1–1 (5–4 p) | Yate Town (7) | 77 |
| 29 | Handsworth (9) | 0–2 | Sheffield (9) | 94 |
| 1 | Workington (7) | 7–1 | Penrith (9) | 101 |
| 13 | Stalybridge Celtic (8) | 2–1 | Runcorn Linnets (8) | 122 |
| 14 | Clitheroe (8) | 15–1 | Glossop North End (9) | |
| 17 | Avro (8) | 1–1 (5–6 p) | West Didsbury & Chorlton (9) | 172 |
| 34 | Leicester Nirvana (9) | 1–3 | Matlock Town (8) | 73 |
| 91 | Cheshunt (7) | 0–1 | Brentwood Town (7) | |
| 94 | Wingate & Finchley (7) | 2–0 | Concord Rangers (8) | 104 |
| 98 | Aveley (7) | 3–0 | Potters Bar Town (7) | |
| 108 | Harrow Borough (8) | 1–2 | Broadfields United (9) | 66 |
| 117 | Faversham Town (8) | 0–4 | Chatham Town (7) | |
| 131 | Roffey (9) | 1–3 | Metropolitan Police (8) | |
| 138 | Lancing (9) | 0–3 | Abbey Rangers (9) | |
| 153 | Easington Sports (9) | 2–0 | Marlow (8) | 126 |
| 175 | Oldland Abbotonians (9) | 0–6 | Portishead Town (8) | 50 |
| 178 | Mangotsfield United (9) | 1–1 (4–2 p) | Hartpury University (8) | 101 |
| 2 | Kendal Town (9) | 1–8 | Stockton Town (7) | 89 |
| 9 | South Liverpool (9) | 2–1 | Ramsbottom United (9) | |
| 10 | Witton Albion (8) | 3–1 | Hyde United (7) | 205 |
| 36 | Mickleover (8) | 2–6 | Aylestone Park (9) | |
| 37 | Quorn (7) | 2–2 (5–4 p) | Long Eaton United (8) | 174 |
| 40 | Gresley Rovers (9) | 4–1 | Deeping Rangers (9) | 107 |

| Tie | Home team (tier) | Score | Away team (tier) | Att. |
|---|---|---|---|---|
| 61 | Stourbridge (7) | P–P | Coton Green (9) | |
| 65 | St Neots Town (8) | 2–2 (2–4 p) | Bugbrooke St Michaels (9) | |
| 78 | Gorleston (8) | 3–0 | Thetford Town (9) | 38 |
| 80 | Lowestoft Town (8) | 3–2 | Wroxham (8) | 144 |
| 93 | Barking (9) | 3–7 | Takeley (8) | 57 |
| 95 | Heybridge Swifts (8) | 2–1 | Walthamstow (8) | 92 |
| 97 | Waltham Abbey (8) | 0–6 | Redbridge (8) | 105 |
| 101 | Ilford (9) | 1–3 | Maldon & Tiptree (8) | |
Match played at Maldon & Tiptree
| 103 | Stanway Rovers (8) | 0–6 | Hertford Town (8) | 118 |
| 104 | Woodford Town (9) | 3–1 | Buckhurst Hill (9) | |
| 107 | Northwood (8) | 4–0 | Tring Athletic (9) | 89 |
| 119 | Ashford United (8) | 4–1 | Chislehurst Glebe (9) | 73 |
| 125 | Sittingbourne (8) | 0–2 | Sheppey United (8) | |
| 133 | Hastings United (8) | 2–0 | Chipstead (9) | |
| 137 | Farnham Town (7) | P–P | AFC Whyteleafe (8) | |
| 148 | Chichester City (7) | 1–2 | Knaphill (9) | |
| 149 | Leatherhead (8) | 2–4 | Walton & Hersham (7) | |
| 152 | Didcot Town (8) | 1–1 (2–1 p) | Banbury United (7) | |
| 158 | Aylesbury Vale Dynamos (9) | 4–5 | Windsor & Eton (9) | 113 |
| 162 | Portland United (9) | 3–0 | Millbrook (Hampshire) (9) | 61 |
| 168 | Petersfield Town (9) | 0–1 | Alton (9) | 117 |
| 170 | Dorchester Town (7) | 3–0 | Bashley (8) | |
| 171 | Havant & Waterlooville (7) | 0–2 | Gosport Borough (7) | 156 |
| 126 | Hollands & Blair (9) | 1–1 (4–3 p) | Herne Bay (8) | 135 |
Thursday 4 September 2025
| 5 | Newcastle Blue Star (9) | 1–0 | Whitby Town (7) | |
| 7 | Hebburn Town (7) | 0–2 | Heaton Stannington (8) | |
| 16 | Ashton United (7) | 1–4 | Bootle (8) | 103 |
| 19 | Atherton Laburnum Rovers (9) | 0–1 | Atherton Collieries (8) | 82 |
| 27 | Pontefract Collieries (8) | 1–3 | Frickley Athletic (9) | |
Match played at Frickley Athletic
| 68 | Northampton ON Chenecks (9) | 0–4 | Moulton (9) | |
| 87 | Felixstowe & Walton United (8) | 0–4 | Harwich & Parkeston (9) | 140 |
| 142 | Crawley Down Gatwick (9) | 1–1 (2–4 p) | Balham (9) | |
| 20 | Trafford (8) | 1–1 (4–3 p) | Irlam (9) | 188 |
| 21 | Wythenshawe (9) | 2–0 | Vauxhall Motors (8) | 167 |
| 26 | Liversedge (9) | 2–5 | Tadcaster Albion (9) | |
Match played at Tadcaster Albion
| 30 | Bottesford Town (9) | 0–1 | Emley (8) | 62 |
| 46 | Alvechurch (7) | 1–4 | Racing Club Warwick (8) | |
| 63 | Dunstable Town (9) | 4–4 (3–5 p) | Royston Town (7) | 100 |
| 89 | Tilbury (8) | 2–0 | Haringey Borough (9) | 107 |
| 105 | Flackwell Heath (8) | 0–4 | Kings Langley (9) | 99 |
| 110 | Amersham Town (9) | 1–1 (3–5 p) | St Albans City (7) | 42 |
| 127 | Sutton Common Rovers (9) | P–P | Welling United (7) | |
| 143 | Lewes (7) | 4–0 | Three Bridges (8) | 50 |
| 144 | Wick (9) | 1–6 | Bognor Regis Town (8) | |
| 154 | Wokingham Town (9) | 3–4 | Hartley Wintney (8) | |
| 183 | Lydney Town (9) | 1–6 | Longlevens (9) | 107 |
| 185 | Tuffley Rovers (9) | 3–2 | Fairford Town (9) | 129 |
| 187 | Tiverton Town (7) | 4–2 | Saltash United (9) | |
| 23 | Stocksbridge Park Steels (7) | 1–9 | Guiseley (7) | 132 |
| 49 | Rugby Town (8) | 1–1 (4–2 p) | Studley (9) | 134 |
| 51 | Halesowen Town (7) | 0–2 | AFC Wolverhampton City (9) | 103 |
| 58 | Coventry Sphinx (8) | 1–3 | Brocton (9) | |
| 59 | Hereford Pegasus (9) | 5–3 | Sutton Coldfield Town (8) | |
| 66 | Arlesey Town (9) | 3–3 (3–4 p) | Leighton Town (8) | |
| 67 | Histon (9) | 17–0 | Yaxley (9) | 89 |
| 69 | Newport Pagnell Town (9) | 1–0 | Daventry Town (9) | 91 |
| 72 | Godmanchester Rovers (9) | 6–0 | Biggleswade Town (8) | |
| 73 | Wellingborough Town (8) | 8–2 | Kempston Rovers (9) | 92 |
| 74 | Baldock Town (9) | 0–3 | AFC Rushden & Diamonds (8) | |
| 76 | Woodbridge Town (9) | 2–0 | Little Oakley (9) | |
| 81 | Bury Town (7) | 6–5 | Brantham Athletic (8) | 71 |
| 82 | Cambridge City (8) | 6–1 | Hadleigh United (9) | |
| 83 | Stowmarket Town (9) | 5–0 | Newmarket Town (8) | |
| 84 | Haverhill Rovers (9) | 10–1 | Lakenheath (9) | 43 |
| 85 | Wisbech Town (9) | 0–15 | Needham Market (7) | |
| 88 | Leiston (7) | 3–2 | Ipswich Wanderers (9) | 55 |
| 99 | West Essex (9) | 0–3 | Ware (8) | |
| 100 | Welwyn Garden City (8) | 1–6 | Hullbridge Sports (9) | |
| 109 | Leverstock Green (8) | 3–3 (5–4 p) | Uxbridge (7) | 89 |
| 122 | Erith & Belvedere (9) | 3–2 | Dartford (7) | |
| 135 | Corinthian-Casuals (9) | 1–6 | Camberley Town (9) | |
| 139 | Steyning Town Community (9) | 0–2 | Seaford Town (9) | 75 |
| 147 | Haywards Heath Town (9) | 1–5 | Eastbourne United (9) | |
| 167 | Brockenhurst (9) | 2–0 | Fareham Town (8) | 134 |
| 173 | Frome Town (8) | 0–7 | Slimbridge (9) | 72 |
| 77 | AFC Sudbury (7) | 11–0 | Ely City (9) | 122 |
Friday 5 September 2025
| 115 | Sevenoaks Town (8) | 0–2 | Whitstable Town (9) | |
| 8 | Burscough (9) | 2–2 (2–4 p) | Warrington Rylands (7) | 80 |
| 47 | Leek Town (7) | 3–2 | Stafford Rangers (8) | 141 |
| 57 | Newcastle Town (8) | 5–1 | Hednesford Town (7) | 98 |
| 155 | Bracknell Town (7) | 4–0 | Eversley & California (9) | |
| 179 | Gloucester City (7) | 5–0 | Cribbs (9) | 140 |
| 52 | Romulus (9) | 1–4 | Redditch United (7) | 210 |
| 90 | Billericay Town (7) | 2–2 (5–4 p) | Cockfosters (9) | |
| 120 | Cray Wanderers (7) | 2–1 | Cray Valley (PM) (7) | 301 |
| 164 | Sholing (7) | 2–4 | AFC Stoneham (9) | |
| 39 | Ilkeston Town (7) | 1–2 | Eastwood Community (9) | |
Sunday 7 September 2025
| 96 | Great Wakering Rovers (9) | 0–2 | Saffron Walden Town (9) | |
| 18 | Pilkington (9) | 3–1 | Lower Breck (8) | |
| 106 | Hilltop (9) | 3–0 | Rayners Lane (8) | |
Match played at Walton & Hersham.
Monday 8 September 2025
| 128 | Ramsgate (7) | 0–0 (3–5 p) | Deal Town (8) | 144 |
| 61 | Stourbridge (7) | 8–0 | Coton Green (9) | 78 |
Wednesday 10 September 2025
| 127 | Sutton Common Rovers (9) | 0–8 | Welling United (7) | 59 |
Match played at Banstead Athletic.
| 141 | Shoreham (9) | 0–5 | Horley Town (9) | |
| 137 | Farnham Town (7) | 1–5 | AFC Whyteleafe (8) | 60 |

=== Upsets ===
| Giantkiller (tier) | Opponent (tier) |
Upset of two leagues above
| Crawley Green (level 9) | Walkover away at Kettering Town (level 7) |
| Ashby Ivanhoe (level 9) | 5–2 at home vs Stamford (level 7) |
| Stourport Swifts (level 9) | 4–2 away vs Stratford Town (level 7) |
| Hackney Wick (level 9) | 3–1 at home vs Hashtag United (level 7) |
| Bournemouth Poppies (level 9) | 2–1 away vs Weymouth (level 7) |
| Stockport Town (level 9) | 5–0 on the road vs Warrington Town (level 7) |
| Hamworthy Recreation (level 9) | 5–2 at home vs Poole Town (level 7) |
| Street (level 9) | 5–4 in penalties after a 1–1 draw at home vs Yate Town (level 7) |
| Knaphill (level 9) | 2–1 away vs Chichester City (level 7) |
| Newcastle Blue Star (level 9) | 1–0 at home vs Whitby Town (level 7) |
| AFC Wolverhampton City (level 9) | 2–0 away vs Halesowen Town (level 7) |
| Erith & Belvedere (level 9) | 3–2 at home vs Dartford (level 7) |
| AFC Stoneham (level 9) | 4–2 away vs Sholing (level 7) |
| Eastwood Community (level 9) | 2–1 away vs Ilkeston Town (level 7) |

=== First Round Qualifying ===
The 188 winners of the preliminary round joined the 44 teams from the National League North, and National League South. Although there are 48 teams in the 6th Tier, Farnborough, Hornchurch, Peterborough Sports, and Worksop Town did not apply to join the competition this year. The draw was done on 4 July 2025, alongside the Preliminary Round. Folkestone Invicta withdrew from the competition at this stage, the 12th walkovers in the competition thus far.

Number of teams per tier still in competition
| National League | National League North and South | Premier Division | Division One | Regional | Total |
|---|---|---|---|---|---|
| 22 / 22 | 44 / 44 | 44 / 75 | 63 / 124 | 85 / 181 | 258 / 446 |

| Tie | Home team (tier) | Score | Away team (tier) | Att. |
|---|---|---|---|---|
Monday 15 September 2025
| 2 | Newcastle Benfield (9) | 1–0 | Scarborough Athletic (6) | |
| 5 | Boro Rangers (9) | 1–0 | Morpeth Town (7) | 102 |
| 7 | Chorley (6) | 1–4 | Marine (6) | |
| 8 | Abbey Hey (9) | 2–3 | AFC Fylde (6) | 115 |
| 19 | Osset United (8) | 6–0 | Alfreton Town (6) | 111 |
| 24 | Ashby Ivanhoe (9) | 2–2 (4–2 p) | Grantham Town (9) | |
| 26 | Harborough Town (7) | 3–2 | Gresley Rovers (9) | |
| 31 | AFC Telford United (6) | 1–0 | Stourport Swifts (9) | 65 |
Match played at AFC Bridgnorth
| 32 | Whitchurch Alport (9) | 2–1 | Leek Town (7) | |
| 34 | Worcester City (7) | 4–0 | AFC Wolverhampton City (9) | 80 |
| 36 | Worcester Raiders (9) | 5–1 | Hereford (6) | |
| 37 | Rushall Olympic (7) | 2–1 | Merthyr Town (6) | |
| 38 | Lye Town (9) | 1–1 (4–5 p) | Pershore Town (9) | |
| 40 | Boldmere St. Michaels (8) | 4–0 | Newcastle Town (8) | 100 |
| 48 | AFC Rushden & Diamonds (8) | 4–2 | Histon (9) | 110 |
| 75 | Tonbridge Angels (6) | 3–1 | Cray Wanderers (7) | |
| 76 | Sheppey United (8) | 3–2 | Dover Athletic (6) | 213 |
| 83 | Carshalton Athletic (7) | 2–1 | Tooting & Mitcham United (9) | |
| 84 | Walton & Hersham (7) | 2–0 | Balham (9) | |
| 85 | Kingstonian (8) | 4–1 | Horsham YM (9) | 60 |
| 87 | Eastbourne Town (8) | 1–6 | Eastbourne Borough (6) | |
| 89 | Badshot Lea (9) | 2–1 | AFC Whyteleafe (8) | |
| 91 | Hampton & Richmond Borough (6) | 3–2 | Jersey Bulls (8) | 98 |
| 101 | Abingdon United (9) | 0–3 | Bracknell Town (7) | |
| 106 | AFC Stoneham (9) | 6–1 | Bournemouth Poppies (9) | 92 |
| 113 | Mangotsfield United (9) | 7–0 | Longlevens (9) | 90 |
| 115 | Gloucester City (7) | 0–1 | Street (9) | |
| 116 | Weston Super Mare (6) | P–P | Hallen (9) | |
| 117 | St. Blazey (9) | 1–11 | Tiverton Town (7) | |
| 118 | Torquay United (6) | 3–1 | AFC St Austell (9) | 131 |
Match played at Buckland Athletic
Tuesday 16 September 2025
| 1 | Heaton Stannington (7) | 1–5 | South Shields (6) | 146 |
| 103 | AFC Portchester (8) | 4–0 | AFC Totton (6) | 59 |
| 13 | Atherton Collieries (8) | 0–0 (2–4 p) | Trafford (8) | 55 |
| 28 | Spalding United (7) | 3–4 | Quorn (7) | 140 |
| 114 | Slimbridge (9) | 3–0 | Taunton Town (7) | 98 |
| 23 | North Ferriby (8) | 3–1 | Buxton (6) | 95 |
| 41 | Kidderminster Harriers (6) | 4–4 (5–3 p) | Hereford Pegasus (9) | |
| 50 | Woodbridge Town (9) | 0–2 | Mulbarton Wanderers (9) | |
| 56 | Leiston (7) | 1–3 | AFC Sudbury (7) | 85 |
| 77 | Margate (8) | 1–3 | Welling United (7) | |
| 78 | Whitstable Town (9) | 5–0 | Deal Town (8) | |
| 81 | Erith & Belvedere (9) | 2–2 (2–4 p) | Dulwich Hamlet (7) | 213 |
| 92 | Dorking Wanderers (6) | 2–1 | Lewes (7) | |
| 93 | Knaphill (9) | 1–0 | Eastbourne United (9) | 38 |
| 95 | Worthing (6) | P–P | Horsham (6) | |
| 100 | Basingstoke Town (7) | 1–2 | Oxford City (6) | |
| 109 | Salisbury (6) | 1–5 | Cirencester Town (9) | 159 |
Wednesday 17 September 2025
| 14 | Radcliffe (6) | 4–0 | Bootle (8) | |
| 22 | Golcar United (9) | 1–4 | Frickley Athletic (9) | |
| 65 | Brentwood Town (7) | 1–3 | Wingate & Finchley (7) | 90 |
| 82 | Ebbsfleet United (6) | 2–2 (0–3 p) | Chatham Town (7) | 384 |
| 9 | Clitheroe (8) | 1–1 (3–4 p) | Stalybridge Celtic (8) | |
| 10 | Southport (6) | 0–7 | Stockport Town (9) | 124 |
| 16 | Warrington Rylands (7) | 1–1 (2–4 p) | West Didsbury & Chorlton (9) | |
| 35 | Brocton (9) | 4–3 | Racing Club Warwick (8) | |
| 44 | Bedford Town (6) | 2–0 | Bugbrooke St. Michaels (9) | |
| 54 | King's Lynn Town (6) | 5–1 | Stowmarket Town (9) | |
| 58 | Aveley (7) | 5–3 | Woodford Town (9) | 35 |
| 61 | Chelmsford City (6) | 3–1 | Enfield Town (6) | 141 |
Match played at Enfield Town.
| 94 | Seaford Town (9) | 1–2 | Abbey Rangers (9) | |
| 110 | Brislington (9) | 0–3 | Bath City (6) | 160 |
| 3 | Stockton Town (7) | 9–0 | Darlington (6) | 178 |
| 11 | Chester (6) | 2–1 | Curzon Ashton (6) | 232 |
| 18 | Cleethorpes Town (7) | 1–1 (2–4 p) | Bradford (Park Avenue) (8) | 104 |

| Tie | Home team (tier) | Score | Away team (tier) | Att. |
|---|---|---|---|---|
| 20 | Guiseley (7) | 5–2 | Emley (8) | 152 |
| 25 | Matlock Town (8) | P–P | Blackstones (9) | NA |
| 30 | Rugby Town (8) | 0–6 | Chasetown (8) | 212 |
| 33 | Leamington (6) | 1–0 | Redditch United (7) | 72 |
| 46 | Crawley Green (9) | 0–9 | AFC Dunstable (8) | 71 |
| 52 | Needham Market (7) | 5–1 | Lowestoft Town (8) | 88 |
| 60 | Hertford Town (8) | 5–0 | Maldon & Tiptree (8) | 133 |
| 66 | Ware (8) | 3–0 | Hackney Wick (9) | |
| 67 | Hilltop (9) | 0–3 | Beaconsfield Town (8) | |
Match played at Beaconsfield Town.
| 69 | Slough Town (6) | 5–2 | Broadfields United (9) | 110 |
| 70 | Hanworth Villa (8) | 6–1 | Chesham United (6) | |
| 72 | Northwood (8) | 2–0 | Hayes & Yeading United (8) | 92 |
| 80 | Sutton Athletic (9) | 0–1 | Erith Town (8) | |
| 96 | Bognor Regis Town (8) | 4–4 (4–2 p) | Westfield (8) | 97 |
Match played at Chichester City.
| 97 | Windsor & Eton (9) | 3–1 | Hartley Wintney (8) | |
| 104 | Portland United (9) | 5–3 | Hamworthy Recreation (9) | 65 |
| 105 | Hamble Club (9) | 2–1 | Alton (9) | |
| 108 | Melksham Town (8) | 3–3 (5–6 p) | Chippenham Town (6) | 236 |
Thursday 18 September 2025
| 21 | Tadcaster Albion (9) | 2–0 | Sheffield (9) | 83 |
Match played at Sheffield.
| 29 | Anstey Nomads (8) | 0–1 | Loughborough Students (8) | |
| 43 | Leighton Town (8) | 2–3 | Godmanchester Rovers (9) | 65 |
| 51 | Harwich & Parkeston (9) | 3–6 | Cambridge City (8) | 115 |
| 86 | Horley Town (9) | 2–7 | Burgess Hill Town (7) | |
| 98 | Binfield (8) | 0–5 | Thatcham Town (9) | 64 |
| 112 | Paulton Rovers (8) | 3–0 | Tuffley Rovers (9) | 82 |
| 27 | Aylestone Park (9) | 3–1 | Eastwood Community (9) | |
| 39 | Stourbridge (7) | 3–2 | Nantwich Town (8) | 103 |
| 42 | Royston Town (7) | 3–3 (4–3 p) | St. Ives Town (7) | |
| 45 | Newport Pagnell Town (9) | 3–4 | Wellingborough Town (8) | 101 |
| 47 | Milton Keynes Irish (8) | 1–4 | Moulton (9) | 135 |
| 49 | Heacham (9) | 3–3 (3–1 p) | Bury Town (7) | 42 |
| 53 | Fakenham Town (9) | 2–1 | Dereham Town (9) | |
| 55 | Haverhill Rovers (9) | 1–0 | Gorleston (8) | 41 |
| 59 | Tilbury (8) | 0–3 | Dagenham & Redbridge (6) | |
| 63 | Takeley (8) | 3–3 (3–5 p) | Bishop's Stortford (7) | |
| 64 | Saffron Walden Town (9) | 0–2 | Redbridge (8) | |
| 68 | Leverstock Green (8) | 0–1 | Colney Heath (9) | 157 |
| 71 | Kings Langley (9) | 3–2 | Edgware & Kingsbury (9) | 86 |
| 90 | Camberley Town (9) | 3–1 | Hastings United (8) | |
| 99 | Didcot Town (8) | 1–1 (10–11 p) | Easington Sports (9) | |
| 102 | Brockenhurst (9) | 0–3 | Dorchester Town (7) | 181 |
| 111 | Portishead Town (8) | 5–2 | Swindon Supermarine (8) | |
| 79 | Folkestone Invicta (7) | W/O | Hollands & Blair (9) | NA |
| 107 | Winchester City (8) | 5–1 | Gosport Borough (7) | |
Friday 19 September 2025
| 4 | Newcastle Blue Star (9) | 1–2 | Blyth Spartans (8) | |
| 6 | Workington (7) | P–P | Spennymoor Town (6) | |
| 17 | Macclesfield (6) | 4–1 | Wythenshawe (9) | |
| 88 | Merstham (8) | 5–0 | Metropolitan Police (8) | 276 |
| 15 | South Liverpool (9) | 4–1 | Witton Albion (8) | 63 |
| 57 | Billericay Town (7) | 4–0 | Hullbridge Sports (9) | 121 |
| 73 | Maidenhead United (6) | 2–2 (5–3 p) | St. Albans City (7) | 131 |
| 74 | Ashford United (8) | 0–9 | Maidstone United (6) | 168 |
Sunday 21 September 2025
| 12 | FC United of Manchester (7) | P–P | Pilkington (9) | |
| 62 | Hemel Hempstead Town (6) | 2–2 (3–2 p) | Heybridge Swifts (8) | |
Monday 22 September 2025
| 116 | Weston Super Mare (6) | 0–3 | Hallen (9) | |
Tuesday 23 September 2025
| 95 | Worthing (6) | 6–0 | Horsham (6) | |
Wednesday 24 September 2025
| 12 | FC United of Manchester (7) | 1–1 (4–3 p) | Pilkington (9) | |
| 25 | Matlock Town (8) | 4–2 | Blackstones (9) | 83 |
Friday 26 September 2025
| 6 | Workington (7) | 1–1 (6–5 p) | Spennymoor Town (6) | 132 |

=== Upsets ===
| Giantkiller (tier) | Opponent (tier) |
Upset of three leagues above
| Newcastle Benfield (level 9) | 5–2 at home vs Scarborough Athletic (level 6) |
| Worcester Raiders (level 9) | 5–1 at home away vs Hereford (level 6) |
| Cirencester Town (level 9) | 5–1 at home vs Salisbury (level 6) |
| Stockport Town (level 9) | 7–0 at home vs Southport (level 6) |
| Hallen (level 9) | 3–0 away vs Weston Super Mare (level 6) |
Upset of two leagues above
| Boro Rangers (level 9) | 1–0 at home vs Morpeth Town (level 7) |
| Osset United (level 8) | 6–0 at home vs Alfreton Town (level 6) |
| Whitchurch Alport (level 9) | 2–1 at home vs Leek Town (level 7) |
| Sheppey United (level 8) | 3–2 at home vs Dover Athletic (level 6) |
| Street (level 9) | 1–0 at away vs Gloucester City (level 7) |
| AFC Portchester (level 8) | 4–0 at home vs AFC Totton (level 6) |
| Slimbridge (level 9) | 3–0 at home vs Taunton Town (level 7) |
| North Ferriby (level 8) | 3–1 at home vs Buxton (level 6) |
| West Didsbury & Chorlton (level 9) | 4–2 in penalties after a 1–1 draw away vs Warrington Rylands (level 7) |
| Hanworth Villa (level 8) | 6–1 at home vs Chesham United (level 6) |
| Heacham (level 9) | 3–1 in penalties after a 3–3 draw at home vs Bury Town (level 7) |
| Hollands & Blair (level 9) | walkover away vs Folkestone Invicta (level 7) |

=== Second Round Qualifying ===
The winners from the previous round joined the 22 teams from the 5th tier National League. Although there were 24 teams in this tier, Braintree Town, and Scunthorpe United did not apply to the Youth Cup this season. The draw was made on 19 September 2025. Truro City withdrew from the competition at this stage, the 13th walkovers in the competition thus far.

Number of teams per tier still in competition
| National League | National League North and South | Premier Division | Division One | Regional | Total |
|---|---|---|---|---|---|
| 22 / 22 | 26 / 44 | 25 / 75 | 29 / 124 | 38 / 181 | 140 / 446 |

| Tie | Home team (tier) | Score | Away team (tier) | Att. |
|---|---|---|---|---|
Monday 29 September 2025
| 16 | Guiseley (7) | 2–4 | Liversedge (9) | 227 |
| 61 | AFC Portchester (8) | 0–4 | Eastleigh (5) | 108 |
| 68 | Torquay United (6) | 1–1 (4–5 p) | Street (9) | 351 |
| 69 | Truro City (5) | W/O | Tiverton Town (7) | NA |
| 23 | Kidderminster Harriers (6) | 2–2 (4–3 p) | Chasetown (8) | 295 |
| 35 | Chelmsford City (6) | 2–2 (4–5 p) | Billericay Town (7) | |
| 37 | Hemel Hempstead Town (6) | 0–0 (6–7 p) | Bishop's Stortford (7) | 229 |
| 39 | Colney Heath (9) | 5–0 | Boreham Wood (5) | 79 |
| 66 | Mangotsfield United (9) | 5–1 | Slimbridge (9) | 102 |
| 21 | Worcester Raiders (9) | 0–3 | AFC Telford United (6) | |
| 24 | Leamington (6) | 3–3 (4–3 p) | Tamworth (5) | 75 |
| 25 | Stourbridge (7) | 0–4 | Boldmere St Michaels (8) | 95 |
| 41 | Maidenhead United (6) | 1–4 | Slough Town (6) | 362 |
| 48 | Carshalton Athletic (7) | 2–1 | Sheppey United (8) | |
| 54 | Walton & Hersham (7) | 3–2 | Abbey Rangers (9) | 85 |
Tuesday 30 September 2025
| 3 | Boro Rangers (9) | 3–2 | South Shields (6) | 132 |
| 56 | Oxford City (6) | 3–0 | Thatcham Town (9) | |
| 27 | Moulton (9) | 1–1 (4–5 p) | AFC Rushden & Diamonds (8) | |
| 32 | Cambridge City (8) | 3–3 (6–5 p) | Mulbarton Wanderers (9) | 107 |
| 49 | Worthing (6) | 2–0 | Bognor Regis Town (8) | |
| 50 | Burgess Hill Town (7) | 2–0 | Kingstonian (8) | 112 |
| 60 | Winchester City (8) | 2–2 (4–3 p) | Dorchester Town (7) | 120 |
| 67 | Pershore Town (9) | 0–2 | Cirencester Town (9) | |
| 70 | Portland United (9) | 3–1 | Yeovil Town (5) | 81 |
Wednesday 1 October 2025
| 15 | Ossett United (8) | 3–3 (3–4 p) | FC Halifax Town (5) | 137 |
| 10 | FC United of Manchester (7) | 0–4 | Radcliffe (6) | |
| 19 | Loughborough Students (8) | 5–1 | Ashby Ivanhoe (9) | 186 |
| 22 | Solihull Moors (5) | 3–1 | Rushall Olympic (7) | 127 |
Match played at Studley.
| 51 | Sutton United (5) | 8–0 | Knaphill (9) | 130 |
| 55 | Merstham (8) | 4–1 | Woking (5) | 237 |
| 64 | Paulton Rovers (8) | 1–1 (3–5 p) | Chippenham Town (6) | 123 |
| 4 | Stockton Town (7) | 2–0 | Blyth Spartans (8) | 206 |
| 9 | Trafford (8) | 0–2 | Stockport Town (9) | |
| 20 | Worcester City (7) | 4–1 | Brocton (9) | |
| 28 | Bedford Town (6) | 2–2 (5–4 p) | Godmanchester Rovers (9) | |
| 31 | King's Lynn Town (6) | 2–3 | Haverhill Rovers (9) | |
Match played at Haverhill Rovers.
| 33 | Needham Market (7) | 2–0 | Fakenham Town (9) | 67 |
| 63 | Bath City (6) | 1–4 | Forest Green Rovers (5) | 279 |

| Tie | Home team (tier) | Score | Away team (tier) | Att. |
|---|---|---|---|---|
| 36 | Redbridge (8) | 0–2 | Hertford Town (8) | |
Thursday 2 October 2025
| 40 | Hanworth Villa (8) | 6–2 | Wealdstone (5) | 93 |
| 14 | Frickley Athletic (9) | 0–2 | North Ferriby (8) | 142 |
| 30 | Heacham (9) | 1–4 | AFC Sudbury (7) | 85 |
| 5 | Workington (7) | 1–3 | Hartlepool United (5) | |
| 7 | Stalybridge Celtic (8) | 0–3 | AFC Fylde (6) | 192 |
| 13 | York City (5) | 6–0 | Bradford (Park Avenue) (8) | |
Match played at Bradford (Park Avenue).
| 57 | Brackley Town (5) | 0–3 | Easington Sports (9) | 108 |
| 65 | Hallen (9) | 2–1 | Portishead Town (8) | 56 |
| 12 | Chester (6) | 11–0 | Rochdale (5) | 277 |
| 18 | Boston United (5) | 1–1 (2–4 p) | Aylestone Park (9) | 158 |
| 26 | Royston Town (7) | 1–1 (5–4 p) | Harborough Town (7) | 112 |
| 29 | Wellingborough Town (8) | 2–1 | AFC Dunstable (8) | 95 |
| 34 | Dagenham & Redbridge (6) | 0–3 | Southend United (5) | 622 |
| 42 | Kings Langley (9) | 1–1 (2–3 p) | Northwood (8) | 176 |
| 43 | Wingate & Finchley (7) | 2–0 | Beaconsfield Town (8) | 56 |
Match played at Beaconsfield Town.
| 44 | Welling United (7) | 1–0 | Maidstone United (6) | |
Match played at Holmesdale.
| 46 | Chatham Town (7) | 1–1 (4–3 p) | Whitstable Town (9) | |
| 47 | Erith Town (8) | 1–0 | Dulwich Hamlet (7) | 200 |
| 52 | Hampton & Richmond Borough (6) | 3–4 | Eastbourne Borough (6) | 107 |
| 53 | Camberley Town (9) | 2–3 | Dorking Wanderers (6) | 84 |
| 59 | Aldershot Town (5) | 2–1 | Badshot Lea (9) | 150 |
| 62 | Hamble Club (9) | 1–0 | AFC Stoneham (9) | |
| 45 | Hollands & Blair (9) | 2–3 | Tonbridge Angels (6) | 130 |
Friday 3 October 2025
| 2 | Newcastle Benfield (9) | P–P | Gateshead (5) | |
| 1 | Morecambe (5) | 0–5 | Carlisle United (5) | |
| 6 | Macclesfield (6) | P–P | Whitchurch Alport (9) | |
| 17 | Quorn (7) | 1–2 | Matlock Town (8) | 175 |
| 8 | Altrincham (5) | P–P | South Liverpool (9) | |
| 11 | Marine (6) | 7–3 | West Didsbury & Chorlton (9) | 172 |
| 38 | Ware (8) | 0–4 | Aveley (7) | 133 |
| 58 | Bracknell Town (7) | 4–3 | Windsor & Eton (9) | |
Tuesday 7 October 2025
| 6 | Macclesfield (6) | 5–0 | Whitchurch Alport (9) | |
| 8 | Altrincham (5) | 4–0 | South Liverpool (9) | |
Thursday 9 October 2025
| 2 | Newcastle Benfield (9) | 0–4 | Gateshead (5) | |

=== Upsets ===
| Giantkiller (tier) | Opponent (tier) |
Upset of four leagues above
| Colney Heath (level 9) | 5–0 at home vs Boreham Wood (level 5) |
| Portland United (level 9) | 3–1 at home vs Yeovil Town (level 5) |
| Easington Sports (level 9) | 3–0 away vs Brackley Town (level 5) |
| Aylestone Park (level 9) | 4–2 in penalties after a 1–1 draw away vs Boston United (level 5) |
Upset of three leagues above
| Street (level 9) | 5–4 in penalties after a 2–2 draw away vs Torquay United (level 6) |
| Boro Rangers (level 9) | 3–2 at home vs South Shields (level 6) |
| Merstham (level 8) | 4–1 at home vs Woking (level 5) |
| Haverhill Rovers (level 9) | 3–2 away vs King's Lynn Town (level 6) |
| Hanworth Villa (level 8) | 6–2 at home vs Wealdstone (level 5) |
Upset of two leagues above
| Liversedge (level 9) | 4–2 away vs Guiseley (level 7) |
| Tiverton Town (level 7) | walkover away vs Truro City (level 5) |

=== Third Round Qualifying ===
The 70 winners from the previous round competed in this round for a spot in the competition proper. The 16 teams from the ninth tier were the lowest ranked teams remaining in the competition. The draw was made on 3 October 2025.

Number of teams per tier still in competition
| National League | National League North and South | Premier Division | Division One | Regional | Total |
|---|---|---|---|---|---|
| 12 / 22 | 16 / 44 | 16 / 75 | 13 / 124 | 13 / 181 | 70 / 446 |

| Tie | Home team (tier) | Score | Away team (tier) | Att. |
|---|---|---|---|---|
Monday 13 October 2025
| 7 | Radcliffe (6) | 0–0 (5–4 p) | Altrincham (5) | 334 |
| 32 | Mangotsfield United (9) | 0–0 (12–11 p) | Aldershot Town (5) | 141 |
| 18 | Hertford Town (8) | 3–2 | Aveley (7) | 259 |
| 23 | Walton & Hersham (7) | 4–1 | Chatham Town (7) | |
| 24 | Tonbridge Angels (6) | 1–0 | Welling United (7) | 90 |
Tuesday 14 October 2025
| 11 | Kidderminster Harriers (6) | 2–0 | Worcester City (7) | 389 |
| 9 | Boldmere St. Michaels (8) | 1–1 (7–6 p) | Solihull Moors (5) | 220 |
| 14 | AFC Telford United (6) | 4–0 | Leamington (6) | |
| 21 | Burgess Hill Town (7) | 3–2 | Carshalton Athletic (7) | |
| 22 | Slough Town (6) | 6–2 | Hanworth Villa (8) | 227 |
| 27 | Worthing (6) | 0–2 | Erith Town (8) | 76 |
| 30 | Cirencester Town (9) | 0–6 | Tiverton Town (7) | 96 |
| 35 | Portland United (9) | 0–4 | Oxford City (6) | 140 |
Wednesday 15 October 2025
| 2 | Gateshead (5) | 0–3 | Carlisle United (5) | |
Match played at Dunston.
| 28 | Sutton United (5) | 0–0 (3–5 p) | Merstham (8) | 387 |
| 31 | Forest Green Rovers (5) | 1–0 | Winchester City (8) | 149 |
| 34 | Eastleigh (5) | 1–2 | Chippenham Town (6) | 156 |
| 3 | FC Halifax Town (5) | 2–0 | AFC Fylde (6) | 246 |
Match played at Brighouse Town.

| Tie | Home team (tier) | Score | Away team (tier) | Att. |
|---|---|---|---|---|
| 15 | Easington Sports (9) | 3–1 | Matlock Town (8) | |
| 29 | Hallen (9) | 2–5 | Hamble Club (9) | 50 |
| 33 | Bracknell Town (7) | 0–0 (4–1 p) | Street (9) | |
Thursday 16 October 2025
| 6 | York City (5) | 5–2 | Boro Rangers (9) | 140 |
Match played at Pickering Town.
| 8 | Chester (6) | 4–0 | Liversedge (9) | 174 |
| 12 | Royston Town (7) | 1–2 | Loughborough Students (8) | 109 |
| 13 | Aylestone Park (9) | 8–0 | Bedford Town (6) | |
| 16 | Bishop's Stortford (7) | 4–0 | Haverhill Rovers (9) | 364 |
| 17 | Needham Market (7) | 4–0 | Billericay Town (7) | 154 |
| 19 | Cambridge City (8) | 4–3 | Colney Heath (9) | |
| 20 | AFC Sudbury (7) | 0–3 | Southend United (5) | 231 |
Friday 17 October 2025
| 1 | Marine (6) | 1–2 | Stockport Town (9) | 323 |
| 5 | Stockton Town (7) | 4–1 | North Ferriby (8) | 139 |
| 26 | Eastbourne Borough (6) | 0–0 (6–5 p) | Northwood (8) | 335 |
| 4 | Macclesfield (6) | 5–0 | Hartlepool United (5) | 236 |
| 25 | Wingate & Finchley (7) | 2–2 (4–5 p) | Dorking Wanderers (6) | 103 |
Match played at Potters Bar Town.
Thursday 23 October 2025
| 10 | AFC Rushden & Diamonds (8) | 2–5 | AFC Dunstable (8) | 128 |

=== Upsets ===
| Giantkiller (tier) | Opponent (tier) |
Upset of four leagues above
| Mangotsfield United (level 9) | 12–11 in penalties after a 0–0 draw at home vs Aldershot Town (level 5) |
Upset of three leagues above
| Boldmere St. Michaels (level 8) | 7–6 in penalties after a 1–1 draw at home vs Solihull Moors (level 5) |
| Merstham (level 8) | 5–3 in penalties after a 0–0 draw away vs Sutton United (level 5) |
| Aylestone Park (level 9) | 8–0 at home vs Bedford Town (level 6) |
| Haverhill Rovers (level 9) | 2–1 away vs Marine (level 6) |
Upset of two leagues above
| Erith Town (level 8) | 2–0 away vs Worthing (level 6) |

Number of teams per tier still in competition after the Qualifying Rounds
| National League | National League North and South | Premier Division | Division One | Regional | Total |
|---|---|---|---|---|---|
| 5 / 22 | 11 / 44 | 7 / 75 | 8 / 124 | 5 / 181 | 35 / 446 |

== Competition Proper ==
=== First Round ===
The 45 teams from League One and League Two joined the 35 winners from the previous round. Accrington Stanley had closed their academy. Barrow and Crawley Town did not participate in this round as they did not apply to enter the competition. Wycombe Wanderers returned for the first time since 2011–12 after they reopened their academy. The lowest ranked teams were ninth tier sides Aylestone Park, Easington Sports, Hamble Club, Mangotsfield United and Stockport Town. The draw was done on 17 October 2025.

Number of teams per tier still in competition
| Premier League (Note: Premier League and Championship teams will join the competition in the third round.) | Championship | League One | League Two | Non-League | Total |
|---|---|---|---|---|---|
| 20 / 20 | 24 / 24 | 24 / 24 | 21 / 21 | 35 / 35 | 124 / 124 |

| 22 October 2025 | Kidderminster Harriers (6) | 1–3 | Mansfield Town (3) | Kidderminster |
| 19:30 GMT | Minaker 51' | | Grant 2'; Cheetham 45+1'; Walters 61' | Stadium: Aggborough; Attendance: 381; Referee: Julia Kings |

| 26 October 2025 | Peterborough United (3) | 5–0 | Lincoln City (3) | Peterborough |
| 19:00 GMT | Shofowoke 11', 57'; Mendonca 27'; Fox 46'; Mlityalwa 53' | Report | | Stadium: London Road; Attendance: 429; Referee: Ian Ruddock |

| 27 October 2025 | Milton Keynes Dons (4) | 2–1 | Shrewsbury Town (4) | Denbigh |
| 19;00 GMT | Osborne 31'; Mackin 33' | | England 71' | Stadium: Stadium MK; Attendance: 341; Referee: Samuel Lee |

| 27 October 2025 | Reading (3) | 3–0 | Bracknell Town (7) | Reading |
| 19:00 GMT | Fuller-Thompson 45+5', 62'; Ntege 70' | | | Stadium: Madjeski Stadium; Attendance: 676; Referee: Callum Peter |

| 27 October 2025 | Macclesfield (6) | 0–5 | Barnsley (3) | Macclesfield |
| 19:30 GMT | | | Ogbu 49', 84'; Town 56'; Woodcock 74'; Kay 78' | Stadium: Moss Rose; Attendance: 376; Referee: Mark Reeves |

| 27 October 2025 | Chesterfield (4) | 4–7 (a.e.t.) | Aylestone Park (9) | Alfreton |
| 19:30 GMT | Stringer 7', 40', 50', 60' | | Cooke 11'; Kane 15', 19', 86', 93'; Haffane 104'; Neal 119' | Stadium: North Street; Attendance: 180; Referee: Waqar Ahmad |

| 27 October 2025 | Boldmere St. Michaels (8) | 2–0 | AFC Telford United (6) | Boldmere |
| 19:45 GMT | Francis 28', 53' | | | Stadium: Boldmere Community Stadium; Attendance: 271; Referee: Richard Walker |

| 28 October 2025 | Carlisle United (5) | 0–1 | Blackpool (3) | Carlisle |
| 19:00 GMT | | | Whaite 86' | Stadium: Brunton Park; Attendance: 529; Referee: Samuel Ross |

| 28 October 2025 | Fleetwood Town (4) | 2–1 | Stockport County (3) | Fleetwood |
| 19:00 GMT | Smith 16'; Warbrick 56' | | Huddleston 23' | Stadium: Highbury Stadium; Attendance: 240; Referee: Bilal Moosa |

| 28 October 2025 | Wigan Athletic (3) | 2–1 | Salford City (4) | Wigan |
| 19:00 GMT | Wessldine 25'; Gelhardt 69' | | Zlitni 54' | Stadium: Brick Community Stadium; Attendance: 541; Referee: Matthew Langdon |

| 28 October 2025 | Bolton Wanderers (3) | 2–1 | Chester (6) | Horwich |
| 19:00 GMT | Ritchie 38'; Kirkpatrick 83' | | Salvatore 21' | Stadium: Toughsheet Community Stadium; Attendance: 354; Referee: Francis Sibley |

| 28 October 2025 | Burton Albion (3) | 0–1 | Port Vale (3) | Burton upon Trent |
| 19:00 GMT | | | Scragg 66' | Stadium: Pirelli Stadium; Attendance: 426; Referee: Callum Timperley |

| 28 October 2025 | Crewe Alexandra (4) | 2–1 | Notts County (4) | Crewe |
| 19:00 GMT | Baker 35'; Swann 69' (pen.) | | Smart 32' | Stadium: Gresty Road; Attendance: 377; Referee: Joshua Howell |

| 28 October 2025 | Cambridge United (4) | 4–0 | Slough Town (6) | Cambridge |
| 19:00 GMT | Crace 49'; Efobi 51', 73' (pen.); Ebanks-Blake 89' | | | Stadium: Abbey Stadium; Attendance: 351; Referee: Matthew Rowling |

| 28 October 2025 | Cardiff City (3) | 0–1 | Cheltenham Town (4) | Leckwith |
| 19:00 GMT | | | Hill 13' | Stadium: Cardiff International Sports Campus; Attendance: 132; Referee: Paul Collier |

| 28 October 2025 | Exeter City (3) | 2–3 | Forest Green Rovers (5) | Taunton |
| 19:00 GMT | Appleton 24'; Baker 78' | | Glover 13' (pen.), 33'; Williams 65' | Stadium: Wordsworth Drive; Attendance: 100; Referee: Jake Woolley |

| 28 October 2025 | Bishop’s Stortford (7) | 0–3 | Southend United (5) | Bishop's Stortford |
| 19:30 GMT | | | Dadson 58', 90+13'; Telford 67' | Stadium: Woodside Park; Attendance: 614; Referee: Thomas Kelly |

| 28 October 2025 | Stevenage (3) | 6–0 | Eastbourne Borough (6) | Stevenage |
| 19:30 GMT | Ayolie 6', 46', 50'; Brown 54'; Doherty 69'; Impey 90+3' | | | Stadium: Broadhall Way; Attendance: 326; Referee: Jonathan Lam |

| 28 October 2025 | Oxford City (6) | 0–0 (a.e.t.) (4–3 p) | Chippenham Town (6) | Marston |
| 19:30 GMT | | | | Stadium: Court Place Farm; Attendance: 273; Referee: Daniel Lamport |
| | Penalties |
| | Starkey (penalty missed); Fornal (penalty scored); Dix (penalty missed); Parker Hunt (penalty scored); Tzenko (penalty scored); Maxwell (penalty scored) | | (penalty scored) Royston; (penalty scored) Keith; (penalty missed) Arlow; (penalty missed) Taylor; (penalty scored) Cook; (penalty missed) Davies |

| 29 October 2025 | York City (5) | 4–2 | Stockport Town (9) | Pickering |
| 19:00 GMT | Greening 31'; 34' (o.g.); Day 55'; Farrar 90+4' | | Mallinson 68'; Ferguson 85' | Stadium: Mill Lane; Attendance: 145; Referee: Ashley Royston |

| 29 October 2025 | Rotherham United (3) | 2–0 | Huddersfield Town (3) | Rotherham |
| 19:00 GMT | Clarke 4'; Gardner 56' | | | Stadium: New York Stadium; Attendance: 303; Referee: Callum Coller-Booth |

| 29 October 2025 | Tranmere Rovers (4) | 4–0 | Harrogate Town (4) | Birkenhead |
| 19:00 GMT | Barton 2'; Mann 26', 32', 39' | | | Stadium: Prenton Park; Attendance: 196; Referee: Jamie Roberts |

| 29 October 2025 | FC Halifax Town (5) | 4–1 | Oldham Athletic (4) | Brighouse |
| 19:00 GMT | Bartkiw 30', 46'; Erianiator 40'; Hill 90+1' | | Hughes 32' | Stadium: St Giles Road; Attendance: 287; Referee: Jon Ashworth-Sears |

| 29 October 2025 | AFC Wimbledon (3) | 2–5 | Colchester United (4) | Wimbledon |
| 19:00 GMT | Hedges 30'; Moore 40' | | Vale 21'; Sasere 55'; Emery 71'; Moore 77', 90+4' | Stadium: Plough Lane; Attendance: 500; Referee: Ryan Calver |

| 29 October 2025 | Plymouth Argyle (3) | 3–0 | Mangotsfield United (9) | Plymouth |
| 19:00 GMT | Sandhu 35'; Burch 86'; Sharpe 89' | | | Stadium: Home Park; Attendance: 377; Referee: Luke McFarlane |

| 29 October 2025 | Barnet (4) | 1–1 (a.e.t.) (6–5 p) | Luton Town (3) | Edgware |
| 19:30 GMT | Kalamaras 90+4' | | Shepherd 64' | Stadium: The Hive Stadium; Attendance: 545; Referee: Stuart Kyle |
| | Penalties |
| | McCarthy (penalty missed) | | (penalty missed) Frimpong-Kwakye |

| 29 October 2025 | Merstham (8) | 6–1 | Tonbridge Angels (6) | Merstham |
| 19:30 GMT | Goal | | Goal | Stadium: Moatside; Attendance: 288; Referee: Gerry Heron |

| 30 October 2025 | Northampton Town (3) | 9–0 | Easington Sports (9) | Northampton |
| 19:00 GMT | Evans 5' (pen.), 22', 55'; Findlay 28', 46'; Obiagwu 35'; Barnett 41'; Okunnu 45+1'; Murray 51' | Report | | Stadium: Sixfields Stadium; Attendance: 418; Referee: Mario Stetakovic |

| 30 October 2025 | Leyton Orient (3) | 2–3 | Bromley (4) | Leyton |
| 19:00 GMT | Nzang 40'; Wellens 81' (pen.) | | Cockerill 45'; Hobbs 47'; Cooley 55' | Stadium: Brisbane Road; Attendance: 511; Referee: Sam Wigington |

| 30 October 2025 | Doncaster Rovers (3) | 4–2 | Radcliffe (6) | Doncaster |
| 19:00 GMT | Pinder 12'; Swales 35'; Cashmore 61'; Thompson 69' | | Chamberlain 71'; Halford 90+4' | Stadium: Eco-Power Stadium; Attendance: 634; Referee: Ryan Coulson |

| 30 October 2025 | Needham Market (7) | 4–0 | Erith Town (8) | Needham Market |
| 19:45 GMT | Gledhill 5'; Bobby 25', 61'; Wakeling 89' | | | Stadium: Bloomfields; Attendance: 217; Referee: Liam Botten |

| 30 October 2025 | Cambridge City (8) | 2–5 | Dorking Wanderers (6) | Sawston |
| 19:45 GMT | Tomasso 12'; Pammenter 26' | | McIntyre 18'; Moore 25', 78'; Rodriguez 85'; Straker 90+5' | Stadium: Sawston Community Stadium; Attendance: 248; Referee: Stuart Lathan |

| 31 October 2025 | Bradford City (3) | 5–3 | Stockton Town (7) | Bradford |
| 19:00 GMT | Lunn 22'; Holt 25'; Goodall 45+1'; Parr 63'; Gomes 75' | | Faulkner 4' (pen.), 29' (pen.); Kennedy 87' | Stadium: Valley Parade; Attendance: 690; Referee: Luke Watson |

| 31 October 2025 | Hertford Town (8) | 2–4 | Gillingham (4) | Hertford |
| 19:00 GMT | Lynch 34'; Coletti 43' | | Booth 23'; Sargent 45', 51'; Luxton 76' | Stadium: Hertingfordbury Park; Attendance: 340; Referee: Stuart Kyle |

| 31 October 2025 | Loughborough Students (8) | 1–6 | Grimsby Town (4) | Loughborough |
| 19:00 GMT | Rahic 27' | | Smith 16'; Booth 31'; Hawley 53'; Sharp 68' | Stadium: Loughborough University Stadium; Attendance: 139; Referee: Richard A. Morris |

| 31 October 2025 | Walton & Hersham (7) | 4–3 (a.e.t.) | Burgess Hill Town (7) | Walton-on-Thames |
| 19:45 GMT | Danso 70', 98'; Moffat 75'; Oliver 108' | | 47'; 80'; 114' | Stadium: Elmbridge Sports Hub; Attendance: 200; Referee: Alfred Finch-Critchley |

| 4 November 2025 | Walsall (4) | 2–0 (a.e.t.) | AFC Dunstable (8) | Bescot |
| 19:00 GMT | Etheridge 114'; Teesdale 117' | | | Stadium: Bescot Stadium; Attendance: 295; Referee: James Hall |

| 4 November 2025 | Wycombe Wanderers (3) | 3–1 | Bristol Rovers (4) | High Wycombe |
| 19:00 GMT | Stones 32', 70'; Hughes 80' | | Dewsbury 56' | Stadium: Adams Park; Attendance: 298 (67 away fans); Referee: Colman O'Meara |

| 4 November 2025 | Newport County (4) | 2–2 (a.e.t.) (3–4 p) | Tiverton Town (7) | Tiverton |
| 19:30 GMT | Osbourne 6'; Pugh 77' | | Collins 10', 72' | Stadium: Tiverton Town; Attendance: 200; Referee: Mark Hickson |

| 4 November 2025 | Hamble Club (9) | 0–6 | Swindon Town (4) | Hamble-le-Rice |
| 19:45 GMT | | | Gray 12'; Mercer 28'; Owiti 46', 86', 89'; Sowe 72' | Stadium: The Abbey; Attendance: 198; Referee: James Kerten |

=== Second Round ===
The 40 winners from the previous round participated in this round. The lowest ranked team left in the competition was the ninth tier club Aylestone Park. The draw was done on 31 October 2025.

Number of teams per tier still in competition
| Premier League | Championship | League One | League Two | Non-League | Total |
|---|---|---|---|---|---|
| 20 / 20 | 24 / 24 | 15 / 24 | 13 / 21 | 12 / 35 | 84 / 124 |

| 10 November 2025 | Peterborough United (3) | 6–0 | Boldmere St. Michaels (8) | Peterborough |
| 19:30 GMT | Croot 7' (o.g.); Sykut 39'; Shofowoke 43', 49', 74'; Mlityalwa 64' | | | Stadium: London Road; Attendance: 309; Referee: Callum Timperley |

| 10 November 2025 | Stevenage (3) | 2–1 | Merstham (8) | Stevenage |
| 19:30 GMT | Mustafa 51'; Brown 86' (pen.) | Report | Uzor 49' (pen.) | Stadium: Broadhall Way; Attendance: 351; Referee: Mario Stetakovic |

| 12 November 2025 | Reading (3) | 2–2 (a.e.t.) (4–3 p) | Cheltenham Town (4) | Reading |
| 19:00 GMT | Fuller-Thompson 61'; Cliff 90+5' | | McNamee 7'; Obieri 9' | Stadium: Madjeski Stadium; Attendance: 325; Referee: Jake Hillier |
| | Penalties |
| | Fuller-Thompson (penalty missed); Adjei (penalty scored); Daka (penalty scored); Jo. Ntege (penalty scored); Ju. Ntege (penalty scored) | | (penalty scored) Obieri; (penalty scored) Barber; (penalty scored) McNamee; (penalty missed) King; (penalty missed) Bailey |

| 17 November 2025 | Barnsley (3) | 0–1 | Mansfield Town (3) | Barnsley |
| 19:00 GMT | | | Grimes 50' | Stadium: Oakwell; Attendance: 370; Referee: Shemakay Own |
Note: Match was originally going to be played 14 November 2025 but was postponed and moved 3 days later.

| 17 November 2025 | Grimsby Town (4) | 1–2 | Doncaster Rovers (3) | Cleethorpes |
| 19:00 GMT | Smith 2' | Report | Cashmore 38'; Pavan 77' | Stadium: Blundell Park; Attendance: 312; Referee: Andrew Park |

| 18 November 2025 | Northampton Town (3) | 0–5 | Port Vale (3) | Northampton |
| 19:00 GMT | | Report | Hunter 34'; Williams 40'; Scragg 64', 70'; Cook 67' | Stadium: Sixfields Stadium; Attendance: 486; Referee: Steven Goldup |

| 18 November 2025 | Blackpool (3) | 4–1 | Aylestone Park (9) | Blackpool |
| 19:00 GMT | Butterworth 78', 82', 86'; Upton 90+6' | | Haggerty 66' | Stadium: Bloomfield Road; Attendance: 307; Referee: Bilal Moosa |

| 18 November 2025 | Rotherham United (3) | 1–3 | Fleetwood Town (4) | Rotherham |
| 19:00 GMT | Ramsell 2' | | Cherry 48'; Junaid 65', 90+5' | Stadium: New York Stadium; Attendance: 302; Referee: Ashley Royston |

| 18 November 2025 | Plymouth Argyle (3) | 3–0 | Milton Keynes Dons (4) | Plymouth |
| 19:00 GMT | Mackin 39'; Finn 47', 62' | | | Stadium: Home Park; Attendance: 422; Referee: Dan Frizzell |

| 18 November 2025 | Gillingham (4) | 2–2 (a.e.t.) (4–2 p) | Forest Green Rovers (5) | Gillingham |
| 19:00 GMT | Luxton 15'; Booth 53' | | Bifulco 3'; Glover 59' | Stadium: Priestfield Stadium; Attendance: 315; Referee: Simon Cutler |
| | Penalties |
| | Dayal (penalty scored); Carruthers (penalty scored); Sargent (penalty scored); Whitelock (penalty scored) | | (penalty missed) Glover; (penalty missed) Walsh; (penalty scored) Hewlett; (penalty scored) Campbell |

| 18 November 2025 | Barnet (4) | 0–3 | Colchester United (4) | Edgware |
| 19:30 GMT | | | Emery 27'; Moore 37'; Makatta 60' | Stadium: The Hive Stadium; Attendance: 541; Referee: Gerry Heron |

| 19 November 2025 | Tranmere Rovers (4) | 0–2 | Bolton Wanderers (3) | Birkenhead |
| 19:00 GMT | | | Coyne 6'; Nuttall 56' | Stadium: Prenton Park; Attendance: 297; Referee: Abid Hussain |
Note: Match was originally going to be played 12 November 2025 but was postponed and moved 1 week later.

| 19 November 2025 | Crewe Alexandra (4) | 0–1 | FC Halifax Town (5) | Crewe |
| 19:00 GMT | | | Wiggin 23' | Stadium: Gresty Road; Attendance: 300; Referee: Mark Reeves |

| 19 November 2025 | Bradford City (3) | 4–1 | York City (5) | York |
| 19:00 GMT | Parr 30', 78', 90+4'; Holt 34' | | Greening 45+1' | Stadium: York Community Stadium; Attendance: 901; Referee: James Gallagher |

| 19 November 2025 | Wycombe Wanderers (3) | 0–1 | Bromley (4) | High Wycombe |
| 19:30 GMT | | Report | 50' | Stadium: Adams Park; Attendance: 272 |

| 20 November 2025 | Needham Market (7) | 0–3 | Southend United (5) | Needham Market |
| 19:45 GMT | | | Ward 41'; Dadson 58'; Blake 90+2' | Stadium: Bloomfields; Attendance: 336; Referee: James Black |

| 21 November 2025 | Wigan Athletic (3) | 2–0 | Walsall (4) | Wigan |
| 18:00 GMT | Hughes 47'; Gelhardt 78' | | | Stadium: Brick Community Stadium; Attendance: 362; Referee: Adewunmi Soneye |

| 21 November 2025 | Oxford City (6) | 2–0 | Walton & Hersham (7) | Marston |
| 19:00 GMT | Oliveira 35'; Green 81' | | | Stadium: Court Place Farm; Attendance: 208; Referee: Neal Templey |

| 26 November 2025 | Swindon Town (4) | 2–1 | Dorking Wanderers (6) | Swindon |
| 19:45 GMT | Griffiths-Brown 32'; Gray 46' | | Hebert 81' | Stadium: County Ground; Attendance: 210; Referee: John Duffy |

| 29 November 2025 | Tiverton Town (7) | 0–4 | Cambridge United (4) | St. Ives |
| 14:30 GMT | | | Murefu 14'; McDougald 77', 84'; Efobi 80' | Stadium: Westwood Road; Attendance: 100; Referee: Thomas Kennedy |
Note: Match was originally going to be played 18 November 2025, but was postponed due to a waterlogged pitch, then postponed again due to a waterlogged pitch.

=== Third Round ===
A total of 44 teams from the EFL Championship and the Premier League joined in this stage of the competition. The lowest ranked team left in the competition was sixth tier side Oxford City. The draw was done on 14 November 2025.

Number of teams per tier still in competition
| Premier League | Championship | League One | League Two | Non-League | Total |
|---|---|---|---|---|---|
| 20 / 20 | 24 / 24 | 11 / 24 | 6 / 21 | 3 / 35 | 64 / 124 |

| 26 November 2025 | Preston North End (2) | 1–1 (a.e.t.) (4–5 p) | West Ham United (1) | Preston |
| 19:00 GMT | Reid 71' | | Dike 56' (pen.) | Stadium: Deepdale; Attendance: 473; Referee: Mark Reeves |
| | Penalties |
| | Bryba (penalty scored); Lescott (penalty scored); Blake (penalty missed); Ayodele (penalty missed); Nolan (penalty scored); Forwood (penalty scored); Snowball (penalty missed) | | (penalty scored) Golambeckis; (penalty scored) Dike; (penalty missed) Brooks; (penalty missed) Jonyla; (penalty scored) Balogun; (penalty scored) Kerr; (penalty scored) Morris-Agyemang |

| 3 December 2025 | Bolton Wanderers (3) | 2–2 (a.e.t.) (4–3 p) | Leicester City (2) | Horwich |
| 19:00 GMT | Lewis 55'; Ritchie 98' | | Hutchinson 44'; De Lisle 111' | Stadium: Toughsheet Community Stadium; Attendance: 161; Referee: James Atkinson |
| | Penalties |
| | Ritchie (penalty scored); Hopkinson (penalty missed); O'Neill (penalty scored); Clement (penalty scored); Mawditt (penalty scored) | | (penalty scored) Adedeji; (penalty missed) Hutchinson; (penalty scored) Daniels; (penalty scored) Fletcher; (penalty missed) De Lisle |

| 3 December 2025 | Wrexham (2) | 5–1 | Port Vale (3) | Wrexham |
| 19:00 GMT | Chesworth 8', 50'; Jones 56'; Graham 85'; Nolan 90+5' | Report | Lake 59' | Stadium: Racecourse Ground; Attendance: 633; Referee: Richard Abson |

| 3 December 2025 | Reading (3) | 2–2 (a.e.t.) (7–6 p) | Middlesbrough (2) | Reading |
| 19:00 GMT | Fuller-Thompson 54'; Booth 95' | | Roberts 51'; Martin 120+2' | Stadium: Madjeski Stadium; Attendance: 279; Referee: Derrick Laing |
| | Penalties |
| | Fuller-Thompson (penalty scored); Hunte (penalty missed); Lonmeni-Dekam (penalty scored); Booth (penalty scored); Zie (penalty scored); Irish (penalty scored); Heywood (penalty scored); Martin-Grant (penalty scored) | | (penalty scored) Harrison; (penalty missed) Roberts; (penalty scored) Martin; (penalty scored) Jones; (penalty scored) Okine; (penalty scored) Haselhurst; (penalty scored) Wager; (penalty missed) Moss |

| 4 December 2025 | Burnley (1) | 2–0 | Wolverhampton Wanderers (1) | Padiham |
| 19:00 GMT | McMahon-Brown 34'; Morison 45+2' | | | Stadium: Burnley Training Centre; Attendance: 150; Referee: Ryan Aldred |

| 5 December 2025 | Crystal Palace (1) | 3–0 | Bradford City (3) | Selhurst |
| 18:00 GMT | Casey 75' (pen.); Oduro 82', 84' | | | Stadium: Selhurst Park; Attendance: 400; Referee: Harry Yellen |

| 5 December 2025 | Millwall (2) | 2–3 | Everton (1) | Bermondsey |
| 19:00 GMT | Thomas-Smith 10', 76' | | Graham 21', 45+2'; Loney 90+7' | Stadium: The Den; Attendance: 515; Referee: Michael Butcher |

| 5 December 2025 | Manchester City (1) | 3–1 | Fulham (1) | Manchester |
| 19:00 GMT | Dunbar-McDonald 80'; McAidoo 87'; Lamb 90' | | Taylor 40' | Stadium: Academy Stadium; Attendance: 500; Referee: Adam Watson |

| 9 December 2025 | Manchester United (1) | 1–0 | Peterborough United (3) | Manchester |
| 19:00 GMT | Gabriel 22' | | | Stadium: Old Trafford; Attendance: 1,378; Referee: Jamie Roberts |

| 9 December 2025 | Norwich City (2) | 2–1 | Stoke City (2) | Norwich |
| 19:00 GMT | Mundle-Smith 63'; Corke 75' (pen.) | | Fearn 34' | Stadium: Carrow Road; Attendance: 462; Referee: Nathan Oakes |

| 10 December 2025 | FC Halifax Town (5) | 0–1 | Colchester United (4) | Brighouse |
| 19:00 GMT | | | Moore 70' (pen.) | Stadium: St Giles Road; Attendance: 243; Referee: Joe Cunningham |

| 10 December 2025 | Sunderland (1) | 3–0 | Nottingham Forest (1) | Hetton-le-Hole |
| 19:00 GMT | Geragusian 31'; Neill 42'; Dinsdale 84' | | | Stadium: Eppleton Colliery Welfare Ground; Attendance: 192; Referee: Jamie Cann |

| 10 December 2025 | Queens Park Rangers (2) | 5–1 | Oxford City (6) | Shepherd's Bush |
| 19:00 GMT | Tarbotton 9'; Hassan 51', 83'; Neill 65', 70' | | Oliveira 44' | Stadium: Loftus Road; Attendance: 447; Referee: Teddy Osborn |

| 10 December 2025 | Cambridge United (4) | 0–3 | Derby County (2) | Cambridge |
| 19:30 GMT | | | Green 9', 15'; Ward 64' | Stadium: Abbey Stadium; Attendance: 508 |

| 11 December 2025 | Hull City (2) | 2–3 | Swansea City (2) | Kingston upon Hull |
| 13:00 GMT | Ocaya 32'; Akinniranye 90+1' | | Gray 14'; Ifans 51'; Popham 90+7' | Stadium: MKM Stadium; Attendance: 104; Referee: Conor Ledgeway |

| 11 December 2025 | Fleetwood Town (4) | 2–0 | Blackpool (3) | Fleetwood |
| 19:00 GMT | Junaid 11'; Cherry 27' | | | Stadium: Highbury Stadium; Attendance: 589; Referee: Dale Wilson |

| 11 December 2025 | Bristol City (2) | 0–1 | Leeds United (1) | Failand |
| 19:00 GMT | | | Njinko 76' | Stadium: Robins High Performance Centre; Attendance: 200; Referee: Craig Scriven |

| 11 December 2025 | Sheffield United (2) | 1–3 | Ipswich Town (2) | Sheffield |
| 19:00 GMT | Morrison 89' | | Unadike 22'; Barrett-Underwood 45' (o.g.); Wood 52' | Stadium: Bramall Lane; Attendance: 710; Referee: Robert Pealing |

| 12 December 2025 | Blackburn Rovers (2) | 2–1 | Southampton (2) | Chorley |
| 19:00 GMT | Joseph 36'; Higgins 90+6' | | Gathercole 45+4' | Stadium: Victory Park; Attendance: 150; Referee: Adam Boubrahmi |

| 12 December 2025 | Bromley (4) | 1–1 (a.e.t.) (4–2 p) | Sheffield Wednesday (2) | Bromley |
| 19:00 GMT | Hobbs 81' (pen.) | | Akpobi 14' | Stadium: Hayes Lane; Attendance: 434; Referee: Thomas Berry |
| | Penalties |
| | Penalty scored | | Penalty missed Penalty scored |

| 13 December 2025 | Liverpool (1) | 2–3 | Charlton Athletic (2) | Kirkby |
| 15:00 GMT | Lambie 53'; Inglethorpe 87' | | Belton 18'; McMillan 37'; Tagoe 50' | Stadium: Liverpool FC Academy; Attendance: 98; Referee: Daniel Hitchell |

| 15 December 2025 | Mansfield Town (3) | 1–4 | Arsenal (1) | Mansfield |
| 19:00 GMT | Oldershaw 67' | | Hamill 11'; Hashi (pen.), 16'; Zečević-John 61'; Bailey-Joseph 68' | Stadium: Field Mill; Attendance: 1,640; Referee: Thomas Hales |

| 15 December 2025 | Coventry City (2) | 4–1 | Birmingham City (2) | Coventry |
| 19:00 GMT | Wright 17'; Russon 51'; Stidder 70'; Lincoln 90+7' | | Rea 21' | Stadium: Coventry Building Society Arena; Attendance: 914; Referee: Thomas Durno |

| 15 December 2025 | Watford (2) | 1–0 | Plymouth Argyle (3) | Kings Langley |
| 19:00 GMT | Norville 40' | | | Stadium: Gaywood Park; Attendance: 241; Referee: Manny Chandwani |

| 15 December 2025 | Doncaster Rovers (3) | 1–4 | Aston Villa (1) | Doncaster |
| 19:00 GMT | Musgrave-Dore 7' | | Burrowes 10', 42'; Jenner 12'; McGrath 38' | Stadium: Eco-Power Stadium; Attendance: 517; Referee: Waqar Ahmad |

| 16 December 2025 | Newcastle United (1) | 5–2 | Portsmouth (2) | Newcastle upon Tyne |
| 18:00 GMT | Mills 1', 9'; Ferreira 41', 51', 73' | | Singerr 19'; Downey 90+1' | Stadium: Whitley Park; Attendance: 293; Referee: Alex Clark |

| 16 December 2025 | Tottenham Hotspur (1) | 2–5 | Brighton & Hove Albion (1) | Stevenage |
| 19:00 GMT | Elliott-Parris 9'; Thompson 30' | Report | Howell 14', 87' (pen.); Brett 36', 42'; Cullinane 90+8' | Stadium: Broadhall Way; Attendance: 533; Referee: Christopher Poole |

| 16 December 2025 | Brentford (1) | 1–2 | Chelsea (1) | Staines-upon-Thames |
| 19:00 GMT | Redknapp 90+3' | | Barbour 57'; Ezenwata 85' | Stadium: Wheatsheaf Park; Attendance: 800; Referee: Marcus Tingey |

| 17 December 2025 | Oxford United (2) | 2–0 | Wigan Athletic (3) | Littlemore |
| 18:00 GMT | Lee 11'; Missanga 57' | | | Stadium: Kassam Stadium; Attendance: 674; Referee: Isaac Blakey |

| 17 December 2025 | West Bromwich Albion (2) | 4–3 | Bournemouth (1) | West Bromwich |
| 19:00 GMT | Colesby 8'; Okorodudu 20'; French 45'; Letlat 54' | | Spence 59'; Nyarko 71'; Waite 81' | Stadium: The Hawthorns; Attendance: 339; Referee: Jamie Conde |

| 17 December 2025 | Gillingham (4) | 0–2 | Stevenage (3) | Gillingham |
| 19:00 GMT | | | Brown 9'; Ayolie 40' | Stadium: Priestfield; Attendance: 303; Referee: Peter Conn |

| 17 December 2025 | Southend United (5) | 1–1 (a.e.t.) (2–0 p) | Swindon Town (4) | Southend-on-Sea |
| 19:45 GMT | Zlatev 55' | | Foye 8' | Stadium: Roots Hall; Attendance: 733 |
| | Penalties |
| | Zlatev (penalty scored); Humphrey (penalty missed); Blake (penalty missed); Onuh (penalty scored) | | (penalty missed) Griffiths-Brown; (penalty missed) Owiti; (penalty missed) Dorland; (penalty missed) Gray |

=== Fourth Round ===
The 32 winners from the previous round competed in this round. The lowest ranked team left in the competition was fifth tier side Southend United. The draw was done on 5 December 2025.

Number of teams per tier still in competition
| Premier League | Championship | League One | League Two | Non-League | Total |
|---|---|---|---|---|---|
| 13 / 20 | 12 / 24 | 3 / 24 | 3 / 21 | 1 / 35 | 32 / 124 |

| 8 January 2026 | Watford (2) | 1–3 | Charlton Athletic (2) | Watford |
| 19:00 GMT | Smith-Daley 47' | | McMillan 70'; Richman 88'; Washington-Amoah 90+7' | Stadium: Vicarage Road; Attendance: 403; Referee: Matthew Norton |

| 14 January 2026 | Bolton Wanderers (3) | 1–3 | Stevenage (3) | Horwich |
| 19:00 GMT | Ritchie 55' | | Brown 36'; England 72'; Mustafa 73' | Stadium: Toughsheet Community Stadium; Attendance: 187; Referee: Scott Simpson |

| 14 January 2026 | Reading (3) | 2–3 | Chelsea | Reading |
| 19:00 GMT | Saint-Louis 31'; Booth 74' | | Kavuma-McQueen 6', 39'; Watson 63' | Stadium: Madjeski Stadium; Attendance: 594; Referee: Gary Parsons |

| 15 January 2026 | Bromley (4) | 1–2 | Ipswich Town (2) | Bromley |
| 19:00 GMT | Anunlopo 25' | | Unadike 13'; Eze 63' | Stadium: Hayes Lane; Attendance: 802; Referee: Steven Hughes |

| 16 January 2026 | Manchester City | 5–2 | Arsenal | Manchester |
| 19:00 GMT | Braithwaite 27'; Samba 37', 43'; Dunbar-McDonald 41'; Parker 90+5' | | O'Neill 45+1' (pen.); Bailey-Joseph 85' | Stadium: Academy Stadium; Attendance: 677; Referee: Joe Moss |

| 16 January 2026 | Everton | 2–2 (a.e.t.) (3–0 p) | West Ham United | Walton |
| 19:00 GMT | Graham 42'; Pita 45+4' | | Beckford 30'; Dike 69' | Stadium: Goodison Park; Attendance: 500; Referee: Jack Churchill |
| | Penalties |
| | Robert (penalty scored); Nsangou (penalty missed); Graham (penalty scored); Clarke (penalty scored) | | (penalty missed) Dike; (penalty missed) Unwin; (penalty missed) Beckford |

| 19 January 2026 | Leeds United | 1–2 (a.e.t.) | Swansea City (2) | York |
| 19:00 GMT | Njinko 64' | | Jones 8'; Clarke 120' | Stadium: York Community Stadium; Attendance: 403; Referee: David Jones |

| 19 January 2026 | Norwich City (2) | 1–5 | Burnley | Norwich |
| 19:00 GMT | Corke 69' | | McMahon-Brown 35' (pen.), 50', 55', 80'; Derbyshire 88' | Stadium: Carrow Road; Attendance: 659; Referee: Ayrton Hursey |

| 20 January 2026 | Fleetwood Town (4) | 2–3 | Aston Villa | Fleetwood |
| 19:00 GMT | Slater 43'; Stansfield 90+2' | | Burrowes 53', 66'; McGrath 60' | Stadium: Highbury Stadium; Attendance: 356; Referee: Callum Jones |

| 21 January 2026 | Coventry City (2) | 1–8 | Blackburn Rovers (2) | Coventry |
| 19:00 GMT | Nidjebu 2' | | Ball 5' (pen.); Joseph 7', 19', 24', 58'; Tyjon 43'; Pates 49'; Decandia 69' | Stadium: CBS Arena; Attendance: 492; Referee: George Warren |

| 22 January 2026 | Oxford United (2) | 2–1 | Colchester United (4) | Littlemore |
| 18:00 GMT | 47' (o.g.); Lee 79' | | Do Vale 14' | Stadium: Kassam Stadium; Attendance: 534; Referee: Neil Pratt |

| 22 January 2026 | Newcastle United | 0–4 | Crystal Palace | Newcastle upon Tyne |
| 19:00 GMT | | | Angibeaud 29', 75'; Casey 65', 80' | Stadium: Whitley Park; Attendance: 243; Referee: Liam Smith |

| 22 January 2026 | Southend United (5) | 1–3 | Wrexham (2) | Southend-on-Sea |
| 19:45 GMT | Zlatev 70' (pen.) | | Jones 19'; Murphy 58'; Chesworth 79' | Stadium: Roots Hall; Attendance: 1,078; Referee: Jack Willmore |

| 23 January 2026 | Manchester United | 2–1 (a.e.t.) | Derby County (2) | Greater Manchester |
| 19:00 GMT | Crolla 101' (o.g.); Obi 103' | | Nessling 113' | Stadium: Old Trafford; Attendance: 2,223; Referee: Kavan Hurn |

| 27 January 2026 | Queens Park Rangers (2) | 0–2 | Brighton & Hove Albion | Hounslow |
| 19:00 GMT | | | Kasvosve 2'; Silsby 18' | Stadium: Elite Training Centre; Attendance: 241; Referee: Adam Merchant |

| 29 January 2026 | Sunderland | 3–3 (a.e.t.) (4–3 p) | West Bromwich Albion (2) | Hetton-le-Hole |
| 19:00 GMT | Geragusian 7'; Barker 25'; Wilson 100' | | Parmar 89' (pen.), 107' (pen.); Seven-Seven 90+8' | Stadium: Eppleton Colliery Welfare Ground; Attendance: 181; Referee: Scott Henry |
| | Penalties |
| | Hester (penalty missed); Struk (penalty scored); Bowman (penalty scored); Campbell (penalty scored); Wilson (penalty scored) | | (penalty scored) Parmar; (penalty missed) Colesby; (penalty scored) Maughan; (penalty scored) Seven-Seven; (penalty missed) McNeil |

=== Fifth Round ===
The 16 winners from the last round competed in this round. The lowest level team left in the competition was League One side Stevenage. The draw was done on 16 January 2026.

Number of teams per tier still in competition
| Premier League | Championship | League One | League Two | Non-League | Total |
|---|---|---|---|---|---|
| 9 / 20 | 6 / 24 | 1 / 24 | 0 / 21 | 0 / 35 | 16 / 124 |

| 5 February 2026 | Stevenage (3) | 1–2 | Crystal Palace | Stevenage |
| 19:00 GMT | Brown 36' | | Oduro 19'; Thornett 21' (o.g.) | Stadium: Broadhall Way; Attendance: 777; Referee: Craig Barnet |

| 9 February 2026 | Chelsea | 1–4 | Manchester City | Norbiton |
| 19:00 GMT | Kavuma-McQueen 90+3' | | Samba 46'; Headley 63'; Parker 66'; McAidoo 81' | Stadium: Kingsmeadow; Attendance: 1,068; Referee: Dan Blades |

| 11 February 2026 | Swansea City (2) | 0–2 | Blackburn Rovers (2) | Landore |
| 19:00 GMT | | | Joseph 44', 70' | Stadium: Swansea.com Stadium; Attendance: 658; Referee: Jonathan Bolland |

| 12 February 2026 | Everton | 4–2 (a.e.t.) | Ipswich Town (2) | Vauxhall |
| 19:00 GMT | Pita 4'; Graham 90+6'; Robert 106'; Brouwers 117' (o.g.) | | Compton 7'; Eldred 34' | Stadium: Hill Dickinson Stadium; Attendance: 667; Referee: Jonathan Maskrey |

| 18 February 2026 | Oxford United (2) | 1–4 | Manchester United | Littlemore |
| 18:00 GMT | Holton 60' | Report | Mills 12'; Gabriel 45'; Obi 50'; Ajayi 90+3' | Stadium: Kassam Stadium; Attendance: 3,565; Referee: Callum Fisk |

| 20 February 2026 | Burnley | 2–0 | Charlton Athletic (2) | Leyland |
| 19:00 GMT | King 5'; Lewis 73' | | | Stadium: County Ground; Attendance: 153; Referee: Samuel Bragg |

| 24 February 2026 | Sunderland | 4–1 | Brighton & Hove Albion | Hetton-le-Hole |
| 19:00 GMT | Proctor 10'; Neill 22'; Garagusian 25', 87' | | Brett 71' | Stadium: Eppleton Colliery Welfare Ground; Attendance: 224; Referee: Liam Smith |

| 24 February 2026 | Aston Villa | 1–0 | Wrexham (2) | Hednesford |
| 19:00 GMT | Burrowes 12' | | | Stadium: Keys Park; Attendance: 892; Referee: Scott Simpson |

=== Quarter-finals ===
The 8 winners from the last round competed in this round. The lowest ranked team left in the competition was Championship side Blackburn Rovers. The draw was done on 13 February 2026.

Number of teams per tier still in competition
| Premier League | Championship | League One | League Two | Non-League | Total |
|---|---|---|---|---|---|
| 7 / 20 | 1 / 24 | 0 / 24 | 0 / 21 | 0 / 35 | 8 / 124 |

| 10 March 2026 | Aston Villa | 2–3 | Crystal Palace | Aston |
| 18:00 GMT | McGrath 3', 57' | | Casey 29'; Anderson 86'; Okoli 90+2' | Stadium: Villa Park; Attendance: 565; Referee: Scott Jackson |

| 10 March 2026 | Blackburn Rovers (2) | 2–1 | Burnley | Blackburn |
| 19:00 GMT | Joseph 46'; Sergeant 90+3' | | So 32' | Stadium: Ewood Park; Attendance: 1,816; Referee: Jamie O'Connor |

| 13 March 2026 | Manchester City | 3–0 | Everton | Manchester |
| 19:00 GMT | Samba 58' (pen.); Heskey 73'; Lamb 80' | | | Stadium: Academy Stadium; Attendance: 1,148; Referee: Richie Watkins |

| 18 March 2026 | Manchester United | 3–2 | Sunderland | Greater Manchester |
| 19:00 GMT | Ajayi 43'; Obi 70'; Brown 77' | | Proctor 59'; Scott 62' | Stadium: Old Trafford; Attendance: 2,516; Referee: Oliver Mackey |

=== Semi-finals ===
The lowest ranked team left in the competition was the Championship side Blackburn Rovers. The draw was done on 13 March 2026.

Number of teams per tier still in competition
| Premier League | Championship | League One | League Two | Non-League | Total |
|---|---|---|---|---|---|
| 3 / 20 | 1 / 24 | 0 / 24 | 0 / 21 | 0 / 35 | 4 / 124 |

| 10 April 2026 | Manchester City | 4–1 | Blackburn Rovers (2) | Manchester |
| 19:00 BST | McAidoo 45'; Lamb 52'; Heskey 54' (pen.); Tevenan 72' | | Joseph 11' | Stadium: Academy Stadium; Attendance: 1,414; Referee: Steven Copeland |

| 17 April 2026 | Manchester United | 2–1 (a.e.t.) | Crystal Palace | Greater Manchester |
| 19:00 BST | Gabriel 77'; Obi 116' | | Anderson 79' | Stadium: Old Trafford; Attendance: 3,189; Referee: Michael Barlow |

=== Final ===
14 May 2026
19:00 BST

| Manchester City | 2–1 | Manchester United |
|---|---|---|
| Samba 40'; Heskey 87' | Report | Kukonki 42' |

Joie Stadium, Manchester
Attendance: 4,380
