= Dan Armer =

Scottish footballer (born 2007)

Personal information
- Full name: Daniel James Armer
- Date of birth: 22 October 2007 (age 19)
- Place of birth: Preston, England
- Height: 1.93 m (6 ft 4 in)
- Position: Centre-back

Team information
- Current team: Manchester United
- Number: 57

Youth career
- Manchester United

Senior career*
| Years | Team | Apps | (Gls) |
| 2026– | Manchester United | 0 | (0) |

International career^{‡}
| 2025 | Scotland U18 | 1 | (0) |
| 2024–2025 | Scotland U19 | 7 | (1) |
| 2026– | Scotland U21 | 0 | (0) |
- * Club domestic league appearances and goals as of 6 November 2026 ‡ National team caps and goals as of 6 November 2026

Dan Armer (born 22 October 2007) is a Scottish professional footballer who plays as a centre-back for Manchester United.

== Club career ==
Born in Preston, Lancashire, Armer is a youth product of Manchester United, where he climbed through the ranks of the Carrington youth teams, signing his first professional contract with United in 2025

He played a key role for Darren Fletcher's under-18 side during the 2025–26 season, captaining the likes of JJ Gabriel, Noah Ajayi and Chido Obi as they reached the final of the FA Youth Cup, only losing to a Manchester City side featuring players like Ryan McAidoo, Floyd Samba, Reigan Heskey or Kaden Braithwaite.

After already having trained regularly with the first team during the previous seasons, he was selected by Michael Carrick for the 2026 summer pre-season, where he impressed in the friendly games.

During the 2026–27 season, while making strides with the under-19 and under-21 teams, he first featured on the team sheet with the first team in October 2026, for the Champions League game against Atlético Madrid.

== International career ==
Born in England, Armer is of Scottish descent. He is a youth international for Scotland, having played for the under-18 and under-19.

In September 2026, he was first called to Scotland under-21s for the Euro qualifyings.

== Style of play ==
A left-footed defender, who first emerged at Manchester United as a player with great physical qualities and composure on the ball, Armer mainly plays as a centre-back.

His profile as been compared to the likes of Harry Maguire, while he named Pau Cubarsí and Scott McTominay as inspirations.

== Personal life ==
Dan Armer is the younger brother of Preston North End graduate Jack Armer.
