= Joe O'Cearuill =

Irish footballer (born 1987)

Personal information
- Full name: Joseph Delpesh O'Cearuill
- Date of birth: 9 February 1987 (age 39)
- Place of birth: Edmonton, England
- Height: 5 ft 11 in (1.80 m)
- Position: Defender

Youth career
- 2004–2005: Leyton Orient
- 2005–2006: Watford

Senior career*
Years	Team	Apps	(Gls)
2006–2007	Arsenal	0	(0)
2007	→ Brighton & Hove Albion (loan)	8	(0)
2007–2008	Barnet	14	(0)
2008–2009	St Patrick's Athletic	15	(0)
2009	Harlow Town	2	(0)
2009	Boreham Wood	1	(0)
2009–2010	Forest Green Rovers	14	(0)
2010–2011	Bishop's Stortford	15	(1)
2011	Tooting & Mitcham United	12	(0)
2012–2013	Haringey Borough	28	(2)
2013	Enfield Town		
2013–2015	Haringey Borough		
2015	Heybridge Swifts	3	(0)
2015	Dover Athletic	0	(0)
2015–2016	Staines Town	29	(0)
2016	Haringey Borough	9	(0)

International career
2007	Republic of Ireland U21	1	(0)
2006	Republic of Ireland B	1	(0)
2007	Republic of Ireland	2	(0)
- * Club domestic league appearances and goals

Joseph Delpesh O'Cearuill (born 9 February 1987) is a retired footballer who played as a defender. His previous clubs have included Barnet and St. Patrick's Athletic, and he has been capped by the Republic of Ireland.

== Career ==
Born in Edmonton, London, O'Cearuill started his career at Leyton Orient, playing 27 youth team games in the 2004–05 season, before being released in August 2005.

He joined Watford as a youth player for the 2005–06 season, but was released in the summer of 2006. He was signed by Premier League team Arsenal in July on a professional contract, having impressed after playing in their reserve team towards the end of the season. He was an unused substitute for the Arsenal first team on 24 October 2006; a League Cup third round match against West Bromwich Albion.

He moved to Barnet in August 2007 and made a total of 18 senior appearances for them.

In January 2008 O'Cearuill joined St Patrick's Athletic. He made his competitive debut for St Patrick's on 7 March 2008, in a League of Ireland match against Sligo Rovers. O'Cearuill made a total of 3 UEFA Cup appearances with St. Pats. He left the club in January 2009.

He signed for Harlow Town on 17 September 2009, before signing for Boreham Wood on 27 October. He signed for Conference National team Forest Green Rovers on 6 November.
In September 2010, he signed for Bishop's Stortford. In November 2011 he was playing for Tooting and Mitcham United.

In August 2012 he signed for Haringey Borough, before joining Isthmian League Premier Division side Enfield Town in January 2013.

== International career ==
O'Cearuill was born in England to a Trinidadian and Tobagoan father and Irish mother. He was called up the Republic of Ireland senior squad for the first time in May 2007 for an end of season tour to the United States, making his senior debut as a substitute against Ecuador on 22 May 2007 at Giants Stadium. O'Cearuill then started the subsequent tour game against Bolivia at the Gillette Stadium.

== Personal life ==
O'Cearuill is the father of footballer JJ Gabriel, who plays for the Manchester United Academy. O'Cearuill has been closely involved in his son's football career and has attracted attention for publicly promoting and defending his son on social media.

In September 2026, amid reports of a breakdown in relations between Gabriel's family and Manchester United, Gabriel and his representatives formally requested the immediate cancellation of his registration with the club. O'Cearuill and his son subsequently removed Manchester United-related material from their social-media accounts, raising questions about the influence O’Cearuill has over proceedings.

== Club career statistics ==
This table is incomplete.

Appearances and goals by club, season and competition
Club	Season	League		Cup^{[A]}		League Cup		Europe^{[B]}		Other^{[C]}		Total	
Club	Season	Apps	Goals	Apps	Goals	Apps	Goals	Apps	Goals	Apps	Goals	Apps	Goals
Arsenal	2006–07	0	0	0	0	0	0	0	0	0	0	0	0
Brighton & Hove Albion (loan)	2006–07	8	0	1	0	-	-	-	-	1	0	10	0
Barnet	2007–08	14	0	3	0	0	0	-	-	1	0	18	0
St Patrick's Athletic	2008	15	0	5	0	0	0	3	0	2	0	25	0
Forest Green Rovers	2009–10	14	0	4	0	-	-	-	-	?	0	?	0
Career totals		51	0	?	?	?	?	?		?	?	?	?

=== Notes ===
^A Cup statistics relate to the FA Cup for English teams and for the FAI Cup for St Patrick's
^B European stats listed under 2008 St Patrick's season relate to 2008–09 UEFA Cup
^C The "Other" column constitutes appearances and goals in the Football League Trophy unless stated. For his time at St Patrick's it relates to the 2008 Setanta Sports Cup.

== See also ==
- List of Republic of Ireland international footballers born outside the Republic of Ireland
