= Floyd Samba =

German footballer (born 2009)

Personal information
- Date of birth: 15 January 2009 (age 17)
- Place of birth: Macclesfield, England
- Height: 1.83 m (6 ft 0 in)
- Position: Midfielder

Team information
- Current team: Manchester City
- Number: 75

Youth career
- Manchester City

Senior career*
Years	Team	Apps	(Gls)
2026–	Manchester City	0	(0)

International career^{‡}
2024	England U15	3	(0)
2024–2025	England U16	5	(1)
2025	England U17	6	(1)
2026–	Germany U19	3	(0)
- * Club domestic league appearances and goals ‡ National team caps and goals as of 3 October 2026

Floyd Samba (born 15 January 2009) is a professional footballer who plays as a midfielder for Premier League club Manchester City. Born in England, he has represented England internationally at youth level and has been called up to represent both France and Germany internationally at youth level, switching for the latter to represent the U19s since 2026.

== Early life ==
Samba was born on 15 January 2009 in Macclesfield, England. He is the son of the French-born Republic of the Congo international Christopher Samba and a German mother. He is the younger brother of English footballer Tyrone Samba.

== Club career ==
As a youth player, Samba joined the youth academy of English Premier League side Manchester City, starting with the club's under-9s team. During the 2024–25 season, he became part of City's under-18 squad, appearing 13 times as the team won the Under-18 Premier League North. He went on to appear as a substitute in both the semi-final and final of the 2024–25 FA Youth Cup, the latter of which City lost to Aston Villa at Villa Park. On 17 May 2025, Samba appeared as a 76th-minute substitute in the 2024–25 Professional U18 Development League final, with City again losing to Aston Villa.

At the start of the 2025–26 season, Samba became a regular starter for City's under-18s. On 31 October, at the age of 16, he made his debut in the Premier League 2, appearing as a late substitute in a 4–0 win over Leicester City. A day later, he captained the U18s for the first time, registering a goal and an assist in a 5–0 win over Burnley. Overall, he made 24 appearances for Manchester City's youth teams during 2025–26, scoring 17 goals and making six assists. He was an ever present during the club's FA Youth Cup win, and scored the opening goal of the final as City beat rivals Manchester United 2–1 on 14 May 2026.

In 2026, he was promoted to Manchester City's senior team and was named in the matchday squad for the first time in Manchester City's FA Cup fourth round fixture at home to Salford City on 14 February.

On 17 September 2026, Samba made his senior debut and scored two goals in City's 5–0 EFL Cup win against Norwich City. On 20 October, he made his UEFA Champions League debut, starting against Greek champions AEK. He played 62 minutes before being substituted for Ryan McAidoo.

== International career ==
Samba is eligible to represent England, France and Germany internationally, he chose to represent England at youth levels internationally, eventually getting called up with France with their U16 team, and later switching to represent Germany wirh their U19 team in 2026. On 3 September 2025, he debuted for the England national under-17 football team during a 2–1 away friendly win over the Venezuela national under-17 football team.

== Style of play ==
Samba plays as a midfielder. English newspaper Manchester Evening News wrote in 2025 that he "stands above 6ft, which is unusually tall for a central midfielder... often plays as a No. 8 but has the physical profile to contribute in pretty much any central position".

== Career statistics ==
=== Club ===
As of match played 20 October 2026

Appearances and goals by club, season and competition
Club	Season	League			FA Cup		EFL Cup		Europe		Other		Total	
Club	Season	Division	Apps	Goals	Apps	Goals	Apps	Goals	Apps	Goals	Apps	Goals	Apps	Goals
Manchester City U21	2025–26	—			—		—		—		1 (Note: Appearance in EFL Trophy)	0	1	0
Manchester City U21	2026–27	—			—		—		—		1	0	1	0
Manchester City U21	Total		—		—		—		—		2	0	2	0
Manchester City	2026–27	Premier League	0	0	0	0	1	2	1	0	0	0	2	2
Career total			0	0	0	0	1	2	1	0	2	0	4	2
