= Max Hudson =

Welsh footballer (born 2007)

Personal information
- Date of birth: 20 September 2007 (age 19)
- Place of birth: Wrexham, Wales
- Position: Goalkeeper

Team information
- Current team: Manchester City
- Number: 69

Youth career
- Manchester City

Senior career*
Years	Team	Apps	(Gls)
2024–	Manchester City	0	(0)

International career^{‡}
2024–	Wales U17	2	(0)
2024–	Wales U18	1	(0)
- * Club domestic league appearances and goals as of 11 December 2024 ‡ National team caps and goals as of 11 December 2024

Max Hudson (born 20 September 2007) is a Welsh footballer who plays as a goalkeeper for Premier League club Manchester City.

== Club career ==
Born in Wrexham, Wales, Hudson joined the youth academy of English Premier League side Manchester City at under-8 level. In 2024, he was promoted to the club's under-18 team. The same year, he was part of their UEFA Youth League squad. On 11 December 2024, he was named on the bench of the first team during a 0-2 away loss to Juventus in the UEFA Champion League.

== International career ==
Hudson played for the Wales national under-17 football team for 2025 UEFA European Under-17 Championship qualification. On 6 September 2024, he debuted for the Wales national under-18 football team during a 3-2 away friendly win over the Slovakia national under-18 football team.
