= Braiden Graham =

Northern Irish footballer (born 2007)

Personal information
- Full name: Braiden David Jay Graham
- Date of birth: 7 November 2007 (age 19)
- Place of birth: Ballygowan, Northern Ireland
- Position: Forward

Team information
- Current team: Everton

Youth career
- –2023: Linfield

Senior career*
Years	Team	Apps	(Gls)
2023–2024	Linfield	10	(1)
2024–	Everton	0	(0)

International career^{‡}
2023	Northern Ireland U16	3	(1)
2023–2024	Northern Ireland U17	5	(3)
2024	Northern Ireland U18	1	(1)
2024–	Northern Ireland U19	13	(9)
- * Club domestic league appearances and goals as of 10:27, 24 June 2024 (UTC) ‡ National team caps and goals as of 09:13, 3 December 2025 (UTC)

Braiden David Jay Graham (born 7 November 2007) is a Northern Irish professional footballer who plays as forward for Premier League side Everton. He is a Northern Ireland youth international.

== Club career ==
=== Linfield ===
From Darragh Cross, at the age of 15 years-old Graham was the leading scorer for the Linfield U18 side.

On 24 March 2023, Graham made his NIFL Premiership league debut for Linfield appearing as substitute in a 5-0 win against Dungannon Swifts at Stangmore Park. At 15 years and 137 days, he became the youngest player in Linfield history by 19 days, breaking the previous record set by Charlie Allen in 2019. He scored his first senior goal in December 2023 aged 16 years-old. Linfield were 2-1 down in injury time against Larne in the Northern Ireland Football League Cup when Graham scored to equalise. In the subsequent penalty shoot-out Graham also scored as his side triumphed.

=== Everton ===
On 2 July 2024, Graham signed a scholar contract with Everton to play in their Academy side. In November 2024, he signed his first professional contract, agreeing a three-year deal.

== International career ==
In March 2023, Graham was called up to the Northern Ireland U16 squad. Later that year he was also called up to the Northern Ireland U17 side. In May 2024, he made his debut for the under–18 side, scoring a 4–2 defeat to England U18. The following month, he made his debut for the under–19 side, scoring a 2–2 draw with Slovakia U19.

Graham was named in the senior Northern Ireland squad for their June 2026 friendly matches against Guinea and France.

== Style of play ==
The Northern Ireland record goalscorer David Healy was the manager at Linfield when Graham made his league debut, and Healey praised Graham for his scoring ability, being quoted by BBC Sport as saying "he's 'goals, goals, goals', he prowls in and around and he's a deadly finisher."
