= Joseph Jones (footballer) =

English footballer

Personal information
- Full name: Joseph William Jones
- Date of birth: 1880
- Place of birth: Wellington, Shropshire, England
- Position: Winger

Senior career*
Years	Team	Apps	(Gls)
1899–1900	Lanesfield		
1900–1902	Wolverhampton Wanderers	15	(1)
Total		15	(1)
- * Club domestic league appearances and goals

Joseph William Jones (1880–unknown) was an English footballer who played in the Football League for Wolverhampton Wanderers.
