= Finn Geragusyan =

Armenian footballer (born 2007)

Personal information
- Full name: Finn Casper Adam Geragusyan
- Date of birth: 28 October 2007 (age 19)
- Place of birth: Durham, England
- Height: 1.93 m (6 ft 4 in)
- Position: Forward

Team information
- Current team: Sunderland
- Number: 74

Youth career
- –2020: Silksworth CW
- 2021–: Sunderland

Senior career*
Years	Team	Apps	(Gls)
2026–	Sunderland	0	(0)

International career^{‡}
2024	Armenia U17	2	(1)
2025	Armenia U21	2	(0)
2026–	Armenia	1	(0)
- * Club domestic league appearances and goals ‡ National team caps and goals as of 29 March 2026

Finn Casper Adam Geragusyan (Armenian: Ֆին Կասպեր Ադամ Գերագուսյան; born 27 October 2007) is a professional footballer who plays as a forward for Premier League club Sunderland. Born in England, he represents the Armenia national team.

== Early life ==
Geragusyan was born on 27 October 2007 in Durham, England. Growing up, he supported English side Sunderland.

== Club career ==
As a youth player, Geragusyan joined the youth academy of English side Silksworth CW. Following his stint there, he joined the youth academy of English side Sunderland in 2021 and was promoted to the club's senior team in 2026. The Sunderland Echo wrote the same year that he was "long been spoken of as one of the most exciting talents in the club's academy" while playing for them.

== International career ==
Geragusyan is of Armenian descent through his father. He is an Armenia international. During the autumn of 2025, he played for the Armenia national under-21 football team for 2027 UEFA European Under-21 Championship qualification.

On 28 March 2026, he made his debut for Armenia in a friendly match against Belarus, in which they were defeated.

== Career statistics ==
=== International ===
As of match played 29 March 2026

Appearances and goals by national team and year
National team	Year	Apps	Goals
Armenia	2026	1	0
Total		1	0
