= Godwill Kukonki =

English footballer (born 2008)

Personal information
- Full name: Godwill Kukonki
- Date of birth: 6 February 2008 (age 18)
- Place of birth: Stoke-on-Trent, England
- Height: 1.96 m (6 ft 5 in)
- Position: Defender

Team information
- Current team: Manchester United
- Number: 72

Youth career
- 2013–: Manchester United

Senior career*
Years	Team	Apps	(Gls)
2024–	Manchester United	0	(0)

International career^{‡}
2025-	England U17	2	(0)
2026-	England U18	3	(0)
- * Club domestic league appearances and goals ‡ National team caps and goals as of 12:08, 16 April 2026 (UTC)

Godwill Kukonki (born 6 February 2008) is an English professional footballer who plays as a defender for Premier League club Manchester United.

== Club career ==
Having joined Manchester United at the age of five, Kukonki has since progressed through various youth levels. He is part of the U18 team. On matchday 14 of the 2024–25 Premier League, Kukonki was named on the bench against Arsenal, but did not come on as Manchester United lost 2–0. He was also an unused substitute in Premier League games against Newcastle United, Southampton, and Manchester City.

Kukonki featured on the bench in a Europa League quarter-final first leg game against Olympique Lyonnais, and the return leg against the same opponents.

== International career ==
Born in England but of DR Congolese descent, Kukonki is eligible to represent either England's or DR Congo's national team.

Kukonki made his England U17s debut during a 3-2 win over the Netherlands in Vila Real de Santo António on 20 February 2025.

In November 2025, the Democratic Republic of Congo has reportedly offered Kukonki the opportunity to join their senior national team for the upcoming African Cup of Nations and their 2026 FIFA World Cup campaign.

On 25 March 2026, Kukoni made his England U18 debut during a 4-1 2027 UEFA European Under-19 Championship qualification win over Bulgaria in Croatia.

== Style of play ==
Godwill Kukonki is known for his "overpowering physicality and athleticism", and "possesses aerial dominance, composure on the ball, great awareness and a sense of positioning coupled with tackling and ball-playing skills". As he is also left footed, Kukonki has been compared to Manchester City's Joško Gvardiol.

== Career statistics ==
=== Club ===
As of match played 4 November 2025

Appearances and goals by club, season and competition
Club	Season	League			FA Cup		EFL Cup		Continental		Other		Total	
Club	Season	Division	Apps	Goals	Apps	Goals	Apps	Goals	Apps	Goals	Apps	Goals	Apps	Goals
Manchester United	2024–25	Premier League	0	0	0	0	0	0	0	0	0	0	0	0
Manchester United	2025–26	Premier League	0	0	0	0	0	0	—		—		0	0
Manchester United	Total		0	0	0	0	0	0	0	0	0	0	0	0
Manchester United U21	2025–26	—			—		—		—		1 (Note: Appearance(s) in EFL Trophy)	0	1	0
Career total			0	0	0	0	0	0	0	0	1	0	1	0
