= Tyrone Samba =

English footballer

Personal information
- Full name: Tyrone Prosper William Samba
- Date of birth: 31 December 2007 (age 18)
- Place of birth: Macclesfield, England
- Height: 1.83 m (6 ft 0 in)
- Position: Forward

Team information
- Current team: Manchester City
- Number: 97

Youth career
- 2015–: Manchester City

Senior career*
Years	Team	Apps	(Gls)
2026–	Manchester City	0	(0)
- * Club domestic league appearances and goals as of 03:01, 12 January 2026 (UTC) ‡ National team caps and goals as of 03:01, 12 January 2026 (UTC)

Tyrone Prosper William Samba (born 31 December 2007) is an English professional footballer who plays as a forward for Manchester City.

== Club career ==
Samba joined the youth academy of Manchester City as a U8 and worked his way up their youth academy. On 26 July 2024, he signed his first professional contract with Manchester City and was promoted to their U18s for the 2024–25 season. On 12 August 2025, he signed another contract with Manchester City's U18s to defend their U18 title. He was called up to the matchday squad for the senior Manchester City team for a UEFA Champions League match against Bodø/Glimt on 20 January 2026.

== Personal life ==
Tyrone is the son of the French-born Republic of the Congo international Christopher Samba and a German mother. His brother Floyd Samba is also a youth footballer at Manchester City.
