= JJ Gabriel =

English footballer (born 2010)

- Gabriel in 2026

Personal information
- Full name: Joseph Junior Andreou O'Cearuill
- Date of birth: 6 October 2010 (age 16)
- Place of birth: Enfield, England
- Position: Winger

Team information
- Current team: Manchester United
- Number: 77

Youth career
- Top Ballerz FC
- Chelsea
- Arsenal
- West Ham United
- 2020–: Manchester United

International career^{‡}
Years	Team	Apps	(Gls)
2025	England U15	6	(0)
2025	England U16	2	(0)
2026–	England U17	2	(0)
- ‡ National team caps and goals as of 15:17, 31 March 2026 (UTC)

Joseph Junior Andreou O'Cearuill (born 6 October 2010), commonly known as JJ Gabriel, is an English footballer who plays as a forward for Premier League club Manchester United's youth teams.

== Early life ==
Gabriel was born to Joe O'Cearuill and a Greek-Cypriot mother. He grew up in Enfield and developed his skills at grassroots club, Top Ballerz FC before moving to various top academies in the area including Chelsea, Arsenal and West Ham United's. By age eight, Gabriel gained widespread attention after a viral YouTube video earned him the nickname "Kid Messi". In March 2025, he signed a long-term sponsorship deal with Nike.

== Club career ==
Gabriel joined Manchester United in 2020 at the age of ten. On 5 April 2025, the then fourteen-year-old Gabriel became the youngest-ever player to play for Manchester United's under-18 team, scoring twice on his debut in the U18 Premier League against Leeds United. Prior to the 2025–26 season, Gabriel was given shirt number 95 and was permitted to train with the first team of Manchester United. In October, the fifteen-year-old player took part in first team training. On 9 December 2025, he scored in the FA Youth Cup match against Peterborough United at Old Trafford. On 12 May 2026, Gabriel was named the U18 Premier League Player of the Season.

On 1 August 2026, he made his first-team debut in a pre-season friendly against Atlético Madrid at Nationalarenan in Stockholm, Sweden, coming on as a substitute for Bryan Mbeumo in the 82nd minute. He became the youngest Manchester United player to appear in an unofficial match at 15 years old. On 10 September, Gabriel scored a hat-trick in a UEFA Youth League match against Sabah which ended 5–0, becoming the youngest goalscorer for Manchester United in the competition.

Gabriel's camp announced his intention to leave United on 10 September, after he was not included in the squad to face Sabah FK in the UEFA Champions League that day; United were unable to play Gabriel as they had not registered him on their UEFA A list of players.

== International career ==
Gabriel made his England U15 debut in February 2025.

In August 2025, Gabriel turned down an England U16 international call-up for a pair of friendly matches against Italy. His father confirmed that he would instead remain with Manchester United's U18 side. The decision was made because staying with his club was considered more beneficial for his development.

On 1 November 2025, Gabriel made his England U16 debut in a 3–2 loss against Turkey U16, starting the game.

Gabriel made his England U17 debut on 25 March 2026 during a 2027 UEFA European Under-17 Championship qualification match against Faroe Islands at St George's Park National Football Centre.

== Style of play ==
Gabriel can best play as a centre-forward or a winger, and his best skills are technique, dribbling, and ball control. He also likes to do tricks.

== Personal life ==
His father Joe O'Cearuill is a former professional footballer and played for the Republic of Ireland. Gabriel is eligible to play for England, Ireland, Cyprus, and Trinidad and Tobago. He was born and raised in England, but is eligible to play for other countries because of his Irish paternal grandmother, Cypriot mother, and Trinidadian grandfather. Gabriel is reported to have changed his name from his birth name for commercial purposes.

== Honours ==
- U18 Premier League Player of the Season: 2025–26
