= Noah Ajayi =

German footballer (born 2008)

Personal information
- Date of birth: 23 November 2008 (age 17)
- Place of birth: Hamburg, Germany
- Position: Winger

Team information
- Current team: Manchester United U18

Youth career
- –2019: TSV Sasel
- 2019–: Manchester United

International career^{‡}
Years	Team	Apps	(Gls)
2026–	Germany U19	2	(0)
- ‡ National team caps and goals as of 31 March 2026

Noah Ajayi (born 23 November 2008) is a German footballer who plays as a winger for the under-18 team of Premier League club Manchester United.

== Early life ==
Ajayi was born on 23 November 2008. Born in Hamburg, Germany, he is a native of the city. Born to a Nigerian father and a German mother, he moved with his father to England at the age of ten.

== Club career ==
As a youth player, Ajayi joined the youth academy of German side TSV Sasel. Following his stint there, he joined the youth academy of English Premier League side Manchester United.

== International career ==
Ajayi is a Germany youth international. During the spring of 2026, he played for the Germany national under-19 football team for 2026 UEFA European Under-19 Championship qualification.

== Style of play ==
Ajayi plays as a winger. English news website BBC Sport wrote in 2026 that he "cuts in from the left-hand side, and has the pace and balance to unsettle opponents".
