= Kaden Braithwaite =

English footballer (born 2008)

Personal information
- Full name: Kaden Elliot Braithwaite
- Date of birth: 8 February 2008 (age 18)
- Place of birth: Bolton, England
- Position: Defender

Team information
- Current team: Manchester City
- Number: 61

Youth career
- Manchester City

Senior career*
Years	Team	Apps	(Gls)
2024–	Manchester City	1	(0)

International career^{‡}
2023	England U15	4	(0)
2023–2024	England U16	6	(0)
2024–2025	England U17	16	(1)
2025–	England U18	10	(0)
- * Club domestic league appearances and goals as of 23:41, 28 August 2026 (UTC) ‡ National team caps and goals as of 14:38, 3 June 2026 (UTC)

Kaden Elliot Braithwaite (born 8 February 2008) is an English professional footballer who plays as a defender for Premier League club Manchester City.

== Club career ==
Braithwaite was born in Bolton and was first scouted by Manchester City at under-sevens level while playing for his grassroots team Ladybridge. He was named vice-captain of their under-18 team.

On 24 September 2024, Braithwaite made his senior club debut starting in the EFL Cup against Watford. He became the third-youngest player to make their full debut for the club, and the youngest player to play under manager Pep Guardiola.

== International career ==
Born in England, Braithwaite is of Jamaican descent. He is an England youth international. In 2023 he made four appearances for the England under-15 team and also represented England U16.

In September 2024 Braithwaite scored for England U17 against Germany. He was included in the squad for the 2025 UEFA European Under-17 Championship and started all three of their games at the tournament as England were eliminated at the group stage.

On 3 September 2025, Braithwaite made his England U18 debut during a 3-1 win over Uzbekistan. Later that year Braithwaite was selected for the 2025 FIFA U-17 World Cup and played every minute of their tournament including the round of sixteen defeat by Austria.

== Style of play ==
Braithwaite mainly operates as a defender. He specifically operates as a centre-back. He can also operate as a left-back or as a midfielder. He is known for his strength. He is also known for his versatility.

== Career statistics ==
As of match played 17 September 2026

Appearances and goals by club, season and competition
Club	Season	League			FA Cup		EFL Cup		Europe		Other		Total	
Club	Season	Division	Apps	Goals	Apps	Goals	Apps	Goals	Apps	Goals	Apps	Goals	Apps	Goals
Manchester City U21	2024–25	—			—		—		—		1 (Note: Appearance(s) in EFL Trophy)	0	1	0
Manchester City U21	2025–26	—			—		—		—		2	0	2	0
Manchester City U21	2026–27	—			—		—		—		1	0	1	0
Manchester City U21	Total		—		—		—		—		4	0	4	0
Manchester City	2024–25	Premier League	0	0	0	0	1	0	0	0	0	0	1	0
Manchester City	2025–26	Premier League	0	0	0	0	0	0	0	0	—		0	0
Manchester City	2026–27	Premier League	1	0	0	0	1	0	0	0	0	0	3	0
Manchester City	Total		1	0	0	0	2	0	0	0	0	0	2	0
Career total			1	0	0	0	2	0	0	0	4	0	7	0
