= Ryan McAidoo =

English footballer (born 2008)

Personal information
- Full name: Ryan McAidoo
- Date of birth: 24 June 2008 (age 18)
- Place of birth: Harlow, England
- Height: 5 ft 9 in (1.74 m)
- Position: Winger

Team information
- Current team: Manchester City
- Number: 56

Youth career
- 2016–2019: Colchester United
- 2019–2024: Chelsea
- 2024–: Manchester City

Senior career*
| Years | Team | Apps | (Gls) |
| 2025– | Manchester City | 3 | (0) |

International career^{‡}
| 2023–2024 | England U16 | 4 | (1) |
| 2024–2025 | England U17 | 15 | (3) |
| 2025– | England U18 | 7 | (2) |
- * Club domestic league appearances and goals as of 23:27, 5 September 2026 (UTC) ‡ National team caps and goals as of 14:43, 3 June 2026 (UTC)

Ryan McAidoo (born 24 June 2008) is an English professional footballer who plays as a winger for Premier League club Manchester City.

== Club career ==
As a youth player, McAidoo joined the youth academy of Colchester United.

Following his stint there, he joined the youth academy of Premier League side Chelsea. Ahead of the 2024–25 season, he joined the youth academy of Premier League side Manchester City, where he played in the UEFA Youth League.

On 10 January 2026, McAidoo made his senior debut for Manchester City, scoring a goal in a 10–1 victory over Exeter City in the FA Cup third round.

On 28 August 2026, McAidoo made his first Premier League appearance for Manchester City, subbing on in the 82nd minute against Crystal Palace.

== International career ==
McAidoo is an England youth international. He is also eligible to represent Ghana through his heritage.

During May 2025, McAidoo played for England U17 at the 2025 UEFA European Under-17 Championship starting in their opening game of the tournament against Belgium. Later that year he was included in the England squad for the 2025 FIFA U-17 World Cup. McAidoo started group games against Venezuela and Haiti and came off the bench as a substitute during their round of sixteen elimination by Austria.

== Style of play ==
McAidoo plays as a winger. Left-footed, he is known for his dribbling ability.

== Career statistics ==
As of match played 28 October 2026

Appearances and goals by club, season and competition
| Club | Season | League | | | FA Cup | | EFL Cup | | Europe | | Other | | Total | |
| Club | Season | Division | Apps | Goals | Apps | Goals | Apps | Goals | Apps | Goals | Apps | Goals | Apps | Goals |
|---|---|---|---|---|---|---|---|---|---|---|---|---|---|---|
| Manchester City U21 | 2024–25 | — | | | — | | — | | — | | 1 (Note: Appearance(s) in EFL Trophy) | 0 | 1 | 0 |
| Manchester City U21 | 2025–26 | — | | | — | | — | | — | | 2 | 0 | 2 | 0 |
| Manchester City U21 | Total | | — | | — | | — | | — | | 3 | 0 | 3 | 0 |
| Manchester City | 2025–26 | Premier League | 0 | 0 | 2 | 1 | 0 | 0 | 0 | 0 | — | | 2 | 1 |
| Manchester City | 2026–27 | Premier League | 3 | 0 | 0 | 0 | 2 | 1 | 1 | 0 | 0 | 0 | 6 | 1 |
| Manchester City | Total | | 3 | 0 | 2 | 1 | 2 | 1 | 1 | 0 | 0 | 0 | 8 | 2 |
| Career total | | | 3 | 0 | 2 | 1 | 2 | 1 | 1 | 0 | 3 | 0 | 11 | 2 |
