= 2026–27 EFL Trophy =

Tournament details
- Country: England; Wales
- Teams: 64

Tournament statistics
- Matches played: 92
- Goals scored: 354 (3.85 per match)
- Attendance: 144,439 (1,570 per match)
- Top goal scorer(s): (Scotland) Michael Mellon (Stevenage) (5 Goals)
- All statistics correct as of 11 November 2026.

The 2026–27 EFL Trophy, known as the Jersey Mike's Trophy for sponsorship reasons, is the 46th season in the history of the competition, and is a knock-out tournament for clubs in EFL League One and League Two, the third and fourth tiers of the English football league system, as well as the "academy teams" of 16 Premier League clubs.

The defending champions are Luton Town, who defeated Stockport County 3–1 in the previous season's final.

== Participating clubs ==
- 48 clubs from League One and League Two.
- 16 invited Category One Academy teams.

| | League One | League Two | Academies |
|---|---|---|---|
| North | Barnsley; Blackpool; Bradford City; Burton Albion; Doncaster Rovers; Huddersfield Town; Mansfield Town; Notts County; Sheffield Wednesday; Stockport County; Wigan Athletic | Accrington Stanley; Chesterfield; Crewe Alexandra; Fleetwood Town; Grimsby Town; Oldham Athletic; Port Vale; Rochdale; Rotherham United; Salford City; Shrewsbury Town; Tranmere Rovers; York City | Aston Villa; Everton; Leeds United; Liverpool; Manchester City; Newcastle United; Nottingham Forest; Sunderland |
| South | AFC Wimbledon; Bromley; Cambridge United; Leicester City; Leyton Orient; Luton Town; Milton Keynes Dons; Oxford United; Peterborough United; Plymouth Argyle; Reading; Stevenage; Wycombe Wanderers | Barnet; Bristol Rovers; Cheltenham Town; Colchester United; Crawley Town; Exeter City; Gillingham; Newport County; Northampton Town; Swindon Town; Walsall | Arsenal; Brentford; Brighton & Hove Albion; Chelsea; Crystal Palace; Fulham; Ipswich Town; Tottenham Hotspur |
| Total | 24 | 24 | 16 |

== Eligibility criteria for players ==
For EFL clubs

- Minimum of four qualifying outfield players in their starting XI. A qualifying outfield player was one who met any of the following requirements:
  - Any player who started the previous or following first-team fixture.
  - Any player who is in the top 10 players at the club who has made the most starting appearances in league and domestic cup competitions this season.
  - Any player with forty or more first-team starting appearances in their career, including International matches.
  - Any player on loan from a Premier League club or any EFL Category One Academy club.
- A club can play any eligible goalkeeper in the competition.
- Any player out on a long loan term at a National League, National League North, or National League South team can play as long as the loaning team agree to allow the player to return for the match.

For invited teams

- Minimum of six players in the starting line-up who are aged under 21 on 30 June 2026.
- Maximum of two players on the team sheet who are aged over 21 and have also made forty or more senior appearances.

== Competition format ==
Group stage

- Sixteen groups of four teams will be organised on a regionalised basis.
- All groups will include one invited club.
- All clubs will play each other once, either home or away (academy sides will play all group matches away from home).
- Clubs will be awarded three points for a win and one point for a draw.
- In the event of a drawn game (after 90 minutes), a penalty shoot-out will be held with the winning team earning an additional point.
- Clubs expelled from the EFL will be knocked out of the tournament automatically.
- The top two teams in each group will progress to the knockout stage.
- In an Event of which group stage match has been postponed, the Postponed Group stage match will be rescheduled to a no further date than the second, third or fourth Tuesday of November 2026.

Knockout stage

- The Round of 32, the Round of 16 and the quarterfinals of the competition will be drawn on a regionalised basis, even with the reinstated teams.
- In Round 2, the group winners will be seeded and the group runners-up will be unseeded in the draw.
- Semi-final pairings are determined by means of an unseeded draw with no regionalisation.

== Group stage ==
The group stage draw was announced on 23 June 2026, with the Academy teams being drawn on 25 June 2026.

=== Northern section ===
==== Group A ====
| Pos | Div | Team | Pld | W | PW | PL | L | GF | GA | GD | Pts | Qualification |
|---|---|---|---|---|---|---|---|---|---|---|---|---|
| 1 | L2 | Accrington Stanley | 3 | 1 | 2 | 0 | 0 | 8 | 4 | +4 | 7 | Advance to Round 2 |
| 2 | L1 | Sheffield Wednesday | 3 | 2 | 0 | 0 | 1 | 4 | 5 | −1 | 6 | Advance to Round 2 |
| 3 | L2 | Salford City | 2 | 0 | 0 | 1 | 1 | 2 | 3 | −1 | 1 | |
| 4 | ACA | Sunderland U21 | 2 | 0 | 0 | 1 | 1 | 3 | 5 | −2 | 1 | |

Updated to match(es) played on 11 October 2026. Source: EFL

| 22 September 2026 | Accrington Stanley | 3–3 (3–1 p) | Sunderland U21 | Accrington |
| 19:00 BST | Warren 26'; Stockton 51'; Mols 90+3' | Report | Samuel-Ogunsuyi 11'; Proctor 39'; Tutierov 61' | Stadium: Crown Ground; Attendance: 400; Referee: Steven Copeland |
| | Penalties |
| | Mols (penalty scored); Woods (penalty scored); Walton (penalty scored) | | (penalty scored) Proctor; (penalty missed) Whittaker; (penalty missed) Tutierov; (penalty missed) Lightfoot |

| 22 September 2026 | Salford City | 1–2 | Sheffield Wednesday | Salford |
| 19:00 BST | Woodburn 34' | Report | Keillor-Dunn 55'; Lowe 77' (pen.) | Stadium: Moor Lane; Attendance: 2,347; Referee: Aaron Jackson |

| 6 October 2026 | Accrington Stanley | 1–1 (5–4 p) | Salford City | Accrington |
| 19:00 BST | Tutonda 90+8' | Report | Udoh 51' | Stadium: Crown Ground; Attendance: 610; Referee: Gareth Rhodes |
| | Penalties |
| | Mols (penalty scored); Brown (penalty scored); Anderson (penalty scored); Woods (penalty scored); Henderson (penalty scored) | | (penalty scored) Garbutt; (penalty missed) Oluwo; (penalty scored) Cooper; (penalty scored) Mariani; (penalty scored) Graydon |

| 6 October 2026 | Sheffield Wednesday | 2–0 | Sunderland U21 | Sheffield |
| 19:00 BST | Heskey 21'; Bannan 80' | Report | | Stadium: Hillsborough Stadium; Attendance: 5,423; Referee: Simon Hooper |

| 11 November 2026 | Sheffield Wednesday | 0–4 | Accrington Stanley | Sheffield |
| 19:00 GMT | | Report | Smith 39'; Brown 42'; Warren 86'; Caton 90+5' | Stadium: Hillsborough Stadium; Attendance: 5,472; Referee: Robert Massey-Ellis |

| 24 November 2026 | Salford City | v | Sunderland U21 | Salford |
| 19:00 GMT | | | | Stadium: Moor Lane |

==== Group B ====
| Pos | Div | Team | Pld | W | PW | PL | L | GF | GA | GD | Pts | Qualification |
|---|---|---|---|---|---|---|---|---|---|---|---|---|
| 1 | L1 | Wigan Athletic | 3 | 3 | 0 | 0 | 0 | 8 | 5 | +3 | 9 | Advance to Round 2 |
| 2 | L1 | Blackpool | 3 | 1 | 1 | 0 | 1 | 7 | 7 | 0 | 5 | Advance to Round 2 |
| 3 | L2 | Crewe Alexandra | 3 | 1 | 0 | 1 | 1 | 7 | 5 | +2 | 4 | |
| 4 | ACA | Aston Villa U21 | 3 | 0 | 0 | 0 | 3 | 5 | 10 | −5 | 0 | |

Source: EFL

| 18 August 2026 | Wigan Athletic | 3–2 | Aston Villa U21 | Wigan |
| 19:00 BST | Miller 27'; Feeney 40' (o.g.); Costelloe 81' | Report | O'Reilly 75'; Taylor 78' | Stadium: The Brick Community Stadium; Attendance: 2,001; Referee: Scott Jackson |

| 22 September 2026 | Crewe Alexandra | 4–1 | Aston Villa U21 | Crewe |
| 19:00 BST | Offord 31'; Thibaut 40'; Lankester 48', 88' | Report | Jenner 85' | Stadium: Gresty Road; Attendance: 901; Referee: Niall Smith |

| 22 September 2026 | Wigan Athletic | 3–2 | Blackpool | Wigan |
| 19:00 BST | Barrett 3'; Hogan 57'; Murray 78' | Report | Bloxham 72' (pen.); Yates 90' | Stadium: The Brick Community Stadium; Attendance: 1,496; Referee: Gareth Rhodes |

| 6 October 2026 | Blackpool | 2–2 (4–2 p) | Crewe Alexandra | Blackpool |
| 19:00 BST | Morgan 46', 53' | Report | Gibson 30'; McNeill 80' (pen.) | Stadium: Bloomfield Road; Attendance: 915; Referee: Steven Copeland |
| | Penalties |
| | Yates (penalty scored); Taylor (penalty scored); Clarkson (penalty scored); Munroe (penalty scored) | | (penalty scored) McNeill; (penalty missed) Thibaut; (penalty missed) Dancey; (penalty scored) Roberts |

| 27 October 2026 | Blackpool | 3–2 | Aston Villa U21 | Blackpool |
| 19:00 GMT | Ashworth 42'; Yates 71' (pen.); Brown 79' | Report | Boyd 29'; Meade 90+4' | Stadium: Bloomfield Road; Attendance: 823; Referee: Andrew Miller |

| 10 November 2026 | Crewe Alexandra | 1–2 | Wigan Athletic | Crewe |
| 19:00 GMT | Graves 50' | Report | Chilokoa-Mullen 60'; Rimmer 83' | Stadium: Gresty Road; Attendance: 1,150; Referee: Declan Brown |

==== Group C ====
| Pos | Div | Team | Pld | W | PW | PL | L | GF | GA | GD | Pts | Qualification |
|---|---|---|---|---|---|---|---|---|---|---|---|---|
| 1 | L1 | Bradford City | 3 | 3 | 0 | 0 | 0 | 10 | 1 | +9 | 9 | Advance to Round 2 |
| 2 | ACA | Newcastle United U21 | 3 | 2 | 0 | 0 | 1 | 5 | 3 | +2 | 6 | Advance to Round 2 |
| 3 | L2 | Rotherham United | 3 | 0 | 1 | 0 | 2 | 1 | 6 | −5 | 2 | |
| 4 | L2 | York City | 3 | 0 | 0 | 1 | 2 | 2 | 8 | −6 | 1 | |

Source: EFL

| 15 September 2026 | York City | 1–3 | Newcastle United U21 | York |
| 19:00 BST | Felix 8' | Report | Salia 44'; Thompson 46'; Cá 83' | Stadium: York Community Stadium; Attendance: 1,835; Referee: Gareth Rhodes |

| 22 September 2026 | York City | 1–1 (4–5 p) | Rotherham United | York |
| 19:00 BST | Medley 44' | Report | Buyabu 57' | Stadium: York Community Stadium; Attendance: 1,999; Referee: Dale Baines |
| | Penalties |
| | Read (penalty scored); Akinyemi (penalty scored); Stiver (penalty scored); Malcolm (penalty missed); Farrar (penalty scored) | | (penalty scored) Mullin; (penalty scored) Fitzgerald; (penalty scored) Rafferty; (penalty scored) Hall; (penalty scored) Buyabu |

| 22 September 2026 | Bradford City | 2–1 | Newcastle United U21 | Bradford |
| 19:30 BST | Powell 59', 71' | Report | Ferreira 42' | Stadium: Valley Parade; Attendance: 2,132; Referee: Dean Watson |

| 6 October 2026 | Rotherham United | 0–4 | Bradford City | Rotherham |
| 19:00 BST | | Report | Swan 3', 62'; Humphrys 11'; Powell 86' (pen.) | Stadium: New York Stadium; Attendance: 1,498; Referee: Jamie Robinson |

| 3 November 2026 | Rotherham United | 0–1 | Newcastle United U21 | Rotherham |
| 19:00 GMT | | Report | Thompson 34' | Stadium: New York Stadium; Attendance: 805; Referee: Sunny Sukhvir Gill |

| 10 November 2026 | Bradford City | 4–0 | York City | Bradford |
| 19:30 GMT | Sarcevic 32'; Humphrys 61'; Swan 70'; Powell 86' | Report | | Stadium: Valley Parade; Attendance: 2,524; Referee: Jamie O'Connor |

==== Group D ====
| Pos | Div | Team | Pld | W | PW | PL | L | GF | GA | GD | Pts | Qualification |
|---|---|---|---|---|---|---|---|---|---|---|---|---|
| 1 | L2 | Chesterfield | 3 | 2 | 1 | 0 | 0 | 11 | 7 | +4 | 8 | Advance to Round 2 |
| 2 | L2 | Port Vale | 3 | 2 | 0 | 1 | 0 | 8 | 1 | +7 | 7 | Advance to Round 2 |
| 3 | ACA | Manchester City U21 | 3 | 1 | 0 | 0 | 2 | 7 | 11 | −4 | 3 | |
| 4 | L1 | Mansfield Town | 3 | 0 | 0 | 0 | 3 | 4 | 11 | −7 | 0 | |

Source: EFL

| 19 August 2026 | Mansfield Town | 1–4 | Manchester City U21 | Mansfield |
| 19:00 BST | Hendry 88' | Report | Parker 23', 28'; T. Samba 35'; Midwood 83' | Stadium: Field Mill; Attendance: 1,372; Referee: Robert Massey-Ellis |

| 15 September 2026 | Chesterfield | 5–3 | Manchester City U21 | Chesterfield |
| 19:00 BST | Randall 12'; Bryden 23'; Dunkley 49'; Eccleston 75'; Marsh 90+2' | Report | Parker 16'; Lamb 38'; Wain 90+3' | Stadium: SMH Group Stadium; Attendance: 1,469; Referee: Aaron Bannister |

| 22 September 2026 | Chesterfield | 1–1 (4–3 p) | Port Vale | Chesterfield |
| 19:00 BST | Marsh 70' | Report | Hernández 39' | Stadium: SMH Group Stadium; Attendance: 1,319; Referee: Richie Watkins |
| | Penalties |
| | Grigg (penalty scored); Marsh (penalty scored); Mandeville (penalty scored); Cook (penalty missed); Duffy (penalty scored) | | (penalty scored) Hall; (penalty missed) Asamoah; (penalty scored) Headley; (penalty scored) Walters; (penalty missed) Humphreys |

| 6 October 2026 | Port Vale | 2–0 | Mansfield Town | Stoke-on-Trent |
| 19:00 BST | McLaughlin 4' (o.g.); Asamoah 58' | Report | | Stadium: Vale Park; Attendance: 841; Referee: Michael Barlow |

| 27 October 2026 | Port Vale | 5–0 | Manchester City U21 | Stoke-on-Trent |
| 19:00 GMT | Asamoah 4'; McGowan 10'; Watters 30'; Montsma 34'; Figueroa 64' | Report | | Stadium: Vale Park; Attendance: 1,183; Referee: Dale Baines |

| 10 November 2026 | Mansfield Town | 3–5 | Chesterfield | Mansfield |
| 19:00 GMT | Russell 13' (pen.), 20'; Hendry 61' | Report | Randall 45'; Duffy 62', 70'; Naylor 67'; Mandeville 88' (pen.) | Stadium: Field Mill; Attendance: 5,233; Referee: Sam Mulhall |

==== Group E ====
| Pos | Div | Team | Pld | W | PW | PL | L | GF | GA | GD | Pts | Qualification |
|---|---|---|---|---|---|---|---|---|---|---|---|---|
| 1 | L1 | Stockport County (A) | 3 | 2 | 1 | 0 | 0 | 8 | 3 | +5 | 8 | Advance to Round 2 |
| 2 | L2 | Tranmere Rovers (A) | 2 | 1 | 0 | 1 | 0 | 1 | 0 | +1 | 4 | Advance to Round 2 |
| 3 | L2 | Shrewsbury Town (E) | 3 | 1 | 0 | 0 | 2 | 2 | 4 | −2 | 3 | |
| 4 | ACA | Everton U21 (E) | 2 | 0 | 0 | 0 | 2 | 4 | 8 | −4 | 0 | |

Updated to match(es) played on 10 November 2026. Source: EFL
(A) Advances to a further round; (E) Eliminated

| 18 August 2026 | Stockport County | 6–3 | Everton U21 | Stockport |
| 19:00 BST | Mothersille 11', 84', 90+3'; Camps 44'; Mandron 45+7'; Edun 79' | Report | Catesby 52'; Graham 54' (pen.), 77' | Stadium: Edgeley Park; Attendance: 1,938; Referee: Martin Woods |

| 22 September 2026 | Tranmere Rovers | 1–0 | Shrewsbury Town | Birkenhead |
| 19:00 BST | Jones 69' | Report | | Stadium: Prenton Park; Attendance: 1,339; Referee: Paul Marsden |

| 6 October 2026 | Shrewsbury Town | 0–2 | Stockport County | Shrewsbury |
| 19:00 BST | | Report | Adigun 75'; Gardner 85' | Stadium: Shrewsbury's New Meadow; Attendance: 1,918; Referee: Richie Watkins |

| 27 October 2026 | Shrewsbury Town | 2–1 | Everton U21 | Shrewsbury |
| 19:00 GMT | Golding 51'; Thompson-McKenzie 90+2' | Report | Benjamin 84' | Stadium: Shrewsbury's New Meadow; Attendance: 1,563; Referee: Robert Massey-Ellis |

| 10 November 2026 | Stockport County | 0–0 (4–3 p) | Tranmere Rovers | Stockport |
| 19:00 GMT | | Report | | Stadium: Edgeley Park; Attendance: 1,197; Referee: Dale Baines |
| | Penalties |
| | Glover (penalty scored); Bailey (penalty scored); Huddleston (penalty scored); Gardner (penalty missed); Jobe (penalty scored) | | (penalty missed) Watson; (penalty scored) Nevett; (penalty missed) Mann; (penalty scored) Brough; (penalty scored) Veevers |

| 24 November 2026 | Tranmere Rovers | v | Everton U21 | Birkenhead |
| 19:00 GMT | | | | Stadium: Prenton Park |

==== Group F ====
| Pos | Div | Team | Pld | W | PW | PL | L | GF | GA | GD | Pts | Qualification |
|---|---|---|---|---|---|---|---|---|---|---|---|---|
| 1 | L1 | Notts County | 3 | 3 | 0 | 0 | 0 | 10 | 2 | +8 | 9 | Advance to Round 2 |
| 2 | ACA | Nottingham Forest U21 | 3 | 1 | 1 | 0 | 1 | 5 | 6 | −1 | 5 | Advance to Round 2 |
| 3 | L1 | Burton Albion | 3 | 0 | 1 | 1 | 1 | 1 | 4 | −3 | 3 | |
| 4 | L2 | Grimsby Town | 3 | 0 | 0 | 1 | 2 | 1 | 5 | −4 | 1 | |

Source: EFL

| 22 September 2026 | Burton Albion | 1–1 (3–4 p) | Nottingham Forest U21 | Burton upon Trent |
| 19:00 BST | Adiele 25' | Report | Clarke 54' | Stadium: Pirelli Stadium; Attendance: 595; Referee: Richard Aspinall |
| | Penalties |
| | Scutt (penalty scored); Adom (penalty scored); Adiele (penalty scored); Krubally (penalty missed); Henry (penalty missed) | | (penalty scored) Smith; (penalty scored) Whitehall; (penalty scored) Nolan; (penalty scored) Newton |

| 22 September 2026 | Notts County | 2–1 | Grimsby Town | Nottingham |
| 19:00 BST | Roberts 32'; Cooper 90+7' | Report | Sweeney 79' | Stadium: Meadow Lane; Attendance: 2,032; Referee: Jamie Robinson |

| 6 October 2026 | Grimsby Town | 0–0 (2–4 p) | Burton Albion | Cleethorpes |
| 19:00 BST | | Report | | Stadium: Blundell Park; Attendance: 539; Referee: Aaron Bannister |
| | Penalties |
| | Green (penalty missed); Vernam (penalty scored); Finch (penalty missed); Foulkes (penalty scored) | | (penalty scored) Sraha; (penalty scored) Adiele; (penalty scored) Scutt; (penalty scored) Jones |

| 13 October 2026 | Notts County | 5–1 | Nottingham Forest U21 | Nottingham |
| 19:00 BST | Symth 11'; Bedeau 66'; Ndlovu 69'; Grant 74'; Roberts 79' | Report | Sanneh 90+2' | Stadium: Meadow Lane; Attendance: 1,873; Referee: Andrew Humphries |

| 10 November 2026 | Burton Albion | 0–3 | Notts County | Burton upon Trent |
| 19:00 GMT | | Report | Campbell 20'; Smyth 71'; Sanders 76' | Stadium: Pirelli Stadium; Attendance: 1,016; Referee: Isaac Searle |

| 10 November 2026 | Grimsby Town | 0–3 | Nottingham Forest U21 | Cleethorpes |
| 19:00 GMT | | Report | Andrews 16'; Newton 21'; Orr 44' | Stadium: Blundell Park; Attendance: 574; Referee: Gareth Thomas |

==== Group G ====
| Pos | Div | Team | Pld | W | PW | PL | L | GF | GA | GD | Pts | Qualification |
|---|---|---|---|---|---|---|---|---|---|---|---|---|
| 1 | L2 | Oldham Athletic (A) | 3 | 2 | 0 | 0 | 1 | 7 | 7 | 0 | 6 | Advance to Round 2 |
| 2 | L2 | Fleetwood Town | 2 | 1 | 0 | 0 | 1 | 4 | 2 | +2 | 3 | Advance to Round 2 |
| 3 | L1 | Barnsley (E) | 3 | 1 | 0 | 0 | 2 | 9 | 10 | −1 | 3 | |
| 4 | ACA | Leeds United U21 | 2 | 1 | 0 | 0 | 1 | 6 | 7 | −1 | 3 | |

Updated to match(es) played on 11 November 2026. Source: EFL
(A) Advances to a further round; (E) Eliminated

| 22 September 2026 | Barnsley | 3–4 | Leeds United U21 | Barnsley |
| 19:00 BST | Yoganathan 80'; Richards 84'; Connell 87' | Report | Mills 19', 41', 70'; McDonald 43' | Stadium: Oakwell; Attendance: 1,590; Referee: Aaron Bannister |

| 22 September 2026 | Oldham Athletic | 1–0 | Fleetwood Town | Oldham |
| 19:00 BST | Chilvers 46' | Report | | Stadium: Boundary Park; Attendance: 8,851; Referee: Michael Barlow |

| 6 October 2026 | Fleetwood Town | 4–1 | Barnsley | Fleetwood |
| 19:00 BST | Coughlan 59' (pen.); Davies 62'; Loupalo-Bi 67'; Sawkins 67' | Report | Brownlie 81' | Stadium: Highbury Stadium; Attendance: 487; Referee: Andrew Miller |

| 13 October 2026 | Oldham Athletic | 4–2 | Leeds United U21 | Oldham |
| 19:00 BST | Chilvers 27' (pen.); Drummond 53'; Hawkes 66'; Payne 68' | Report | Mills 32'; Njinko 51' | Stadium: Boundary Park; Attendance: 601; Referee: Callum Jones |

| 11 November 2026 | Barnsley | 5–2 | Oldham Athletic | Barnsley |
| 19:00 GMT | Kirk 25', 41'; Johnson 32'; Alker 67'; Yoganathan 89' | Report | Hill 63'; Drummond 71' | Stadium: Oakwell; Attendance: 1,025; Referee: Aaron Jackson |

| 24 November 2026 | Fleetwood Town | v | Leeds United U21 | Fleetwood |
| 19:00 GMT | | | | Stadium: Highbury Stadium |

==== Group H ====
| Pos | Div | Team | Pld | W | PW | PL | L | GF | GA | GD | Pts | Qualification |
|---|---|---|---|---|---|---|---|---|---|---|---|---|
| 1 | L1 | Huddersfield Town | 3 | 3 | 0 | 0 | 0 | 12 | 1 | +11 | 9 | Advance to Round 2 |
| 2 | L1 | Doncaster Rovers | 3 | 2 | 0 | 0 | 1 | 6 | 4 | +2 | 6 | Advance to Round 2 |
| 3 | ACA | Liverpool U21 | 3 | 0 | 1 | 0 | 2 | 3 | 8 | −5 | 2 | |
| 4 | L2 | Rochdale | 3 | 0 | 0 | 1 | 2 | 4 | 12 | −8 | 1 | |

Source: EFL

| 8 September 2026 | Doncaster Rovers | 1–3 | Huddersfield Town | Doncaster |
| 19:00 BST | Ayinde 40' | Report | Spencer 67'; Low 74'; Sørensen 77' | Stadium: Keepmoat Stadium; Attendance: 1,584; Referee: Richard Eley |

| 22 September 2026 | Rochdale | 3–3 (6–7 p) | Liverpool U21 | Rochdale |
| 19:00 BST | Rodney 37'; Henderson 77', 80' | Report | Wright 42'; Trueman 90+4'; Sonni-Lambie 90+6' | Stadium: Spotland Stadium; Attendance: 946; Referee: Gareth Thomas |
| | Penalties |
| | Silcott-Duberry (penalty scored); Middleton (penalty scored); Francis (penalty scored); Henderson (penalty scored); Hayes (penalty scored); Sherring (penalty scored); Waller (penalty missed) | | (penalty scored) Wright; (penalty scored) Trueman; (penalty scored) O'Connor; (penalty scored) Bradshaw; (penalty scored) Chambers; (penalty scored) Sonni-Lambie; (penalty scored) Onanuga |

| 6 October 2026 | Doncaster Rovers | 1–0 | Liverpool U21 | Doncaster |
| 19:00 BST | O'Reilly 45+1' | Report | | Stadium: Keepmoat Stadium; Attendance: 2,326; Referee: Richard Aspinall |

| 6 October 2026 | Huddersfield Town | 5–0 | Rochdale | Huddersfield |
| 19:00 BST | Gooch 13'; Smith-Sway 15'; Ashia 56'; Tovide 79'; Spencer 90+4' | Report | | Stadium: Kirklees Stadium; Attendance: 1,666; Referee: Paul Marsden |

| 3 November 2026 | Rochdale | 1–4 | Doncaster Rovers | Rochdale |
| 19:00 GMT | Henderson 15' | Report | May 54'; Hanlan 63'; Bailey 88'; Hutchinson 90+2' | Stadium: Spotland Stadium; Attendance: 645; Referee: Martin Woods |

| 10 November 2026 | Huddersfield Town | 4–0 | Liverpool U21 | Huddersfield |
| 19:00 GMT | Taylor 1', 31'; Low 40'; Ashia 61' | Report | | Stadium: Kirklees Stadium; Referee: Dean Watson |

=== Southern section ===
==== Group A ====
| Pos | Div | Team | Pld | W | PW | PL | L | GF | GA | GD | Pts | Qualification |
|---|---|---|---|---|---|---|---|---|---|---|---|---|
| 1 | L2 | Exeter City (A) | 3 | 1 | 1 | 1 | 0 | 6 | 4 | +2 | 6 | Advance to Round 2 |
| 2 | L1 | Oxford United | 2 | 1 | 0 | 1 | 0 | 6 | 2 | +4 | 4 | Advance to Round 2 |
| 3 | L2 | Cheltenham Town (E) | 3 | 0 | 2 | 0 | 1 | 4 | 8 | −4 | 4 | |
| 4 | ACA | Tottenham Hotspur U21 | 2 | 0 | 0 | 1 | 1 | 2 | 4 | −2 | 1 | |

Updated to match(es) played on 10 November 2026. Source: EFL
(A) Advances to a further round; (E) Eliminated

| 8 September 2026 | Exeter City | 2–0 | Tottenham Hotspur U21 | Exeter |
| 19:00 BST | Rose 35'; Cayless 86' | Report | | Stadium: St. James' Park; Attendance: 1,647; Referee: Alan Young |

| 22 September 2026 | Cheltenham Town | 2–2 (4–3 p) | Exeter City | Cheltenham |
| 19:00 BST | Bickerstaff 45+1'; Miller 89' (pen.) | Report | Gordon 77'; Cummins 86' | Stadium: Whaddon Road; Attendance: 1,242; Referee: Emily Heaslip |
| | Penalties |
| | Nurse (penalty scored); Otchere (penalty missed); Bickerstaff (penalty scored); Broom (penalty scored); Miller (penalty scored) | | (penalty missed) Gordon; (penalty scored) Samuel; (penalty scored) Woodhouse; (penalty scored) Cummins; (penalty missed) Perry |

| 6 October 2026 | Exeter City | 2–2 (4–3 p) | Oxford United | Exeter |
| 19:00 BST | Perry 7'; Gordon 31' | Report | Bradney 30'; Fitzwater 78' (o.g.) | Stadium: St. James' Park; Attendance: 1,469; Referee: James Durkin |
| | Penalties |
| | Scully (penalty scored); Cummins (penalty scored); Woodhouse (penalty scored); Fitzwater (penalty missed); Cayless (penalty scored) | | (penalty scored) O'Donkor; (penalty scored) Sibley; (penalty missed) Bradney; (penalty scored) Snowden; (penalty missed) Golding |

| 13 October 2026 | Cheltenham Town | 2–2 (7–6 p) | Tottenham Hotspur U21 | Cheltenham |
| 19:00 BST | Miller 45+1', 90+5' | Report | Richarlison 56'; Adewole 73' | Stadium: Whaddon Road; Attendance: 1,731; Referee: Harrison Blair |
| | Penalties |
| | Bickerstaff (penalty scored); Nurse (penalty missed); Otchere (penalty scored); Evans (penalty scored); Miller (penalty scored); Shipley (penalty scored); Weimann (penalty missed); Stevenson (penalty scored); Willcox (penalty scored) | | (penalty scored) Adewole; (penalty scored) Dorrington; (penalty scored) Sowunmi; (penalty missed) Byrne; (penalty scored) Richarlison; (penalty scored) Lehane; (penalty missed) Hardy; (penalty scored) King; (penalty missed) Byfield |

| 10 November 2026 | Oxford United | 4–0 | Cheltenham Town | Oxford |
| 19:00 GMT | Snowden 59'; O'Donkor 74', 90'; Jin-woo 82' | Report | | Stadium: Kassam Stadium; Attendance: 860; Referee: Matthew Russell |

| 24 November 2026 | Oxford United | v | Tottenham Hotspur U21 | Oxford |
| 19:00 GMT | | | | Stadium: Kassam Stadium |

==== Group B ====
| Pos | Div | Team | Pld | W | PW | PL | L | GF | GA | GD | Pts | Qualification |
|---|---|---|---|---|---|---|---|---|---|---|---|---|
| 1 | L1 | Stevenage | 3 | 2 | 1 | 0 | 0 | 10 | 4 | +6 | 8 | Advance to Round 2 |
| 2 | L1 | Leicester City | 3 | 2 | 0 | 0 | 1 | 9 | 4 | +5 | 6 | Advance to Round 2 |
| 3 | L2 | Walsall | 3 | 1 | 0 | 0 | 2 | 5 | 10 | −5 | 3 | |
| 4 | ACA | Fulham U21 | 3 | 0 | 0 | 1 | 2 | 5 | 11 | −6 | 1 | |

Source: EFL

| 22 September 2026 | Leicester City | 6–1 | Fulham U21 | Leicester |
| 19:00 BST | Bristrić 15', 24', 34'; Watson 40', 45+2'; De Cordova-Reid 50' | Report | Chingwaro 45+4' | Stadium: King Power Stadium; Attendance: 1,706; Referee: Lewis Sandoe |

| 22 September 2026 | Walsall | 1–6 | Stevenage | Walsall |
| 19:00 BST | Simper 17' | Report | Mellon 11', 42', 58'; Marçal 29'; Houghton 32'; Broggio 63' | Stadium: Bescot Stadium; Attendance: 1,205; Referee: Robert Massey-Ellis |

| 6 October 2026 | Stevenage | 2–1 | Leicester City | Stevenage |
| 19:00 BST | Marçal 24'; Sanderson 59' | Report | Riis 69' | Stadium: Broadhall Way; Attendance: 2,162; Referee: Emily Heaslip |

| 13 October 2026 | Walsall | 3–2 | Fulham U21 | Walsall |
| 19:00 BST | Sodje 25', 30'; Furlong 44' | Report | Kusi-Asare 54'; Casey 71' | Stadium: Bescot Stadium; Attendance: 798; Referee: Alan Young |

| 10 November 2026 | Leicester City | 2–1 | Walsall | Leicester |
| 19:00 GMT | Lundstram 20'; Smallbone 32' | Report | Dallas 10' | Stadium: King Power Stadium; Attendance: 3,083; Referee: Michael Barlow |

| 10 November 2026 | Stevenage | 2–2 (4–3 p) | Fulham U21 | Stevenage |
| 19:00 GMT | Mellon 22', 59' | Report | Works 37', 79' | Stadium: Broadhall Way; Attendance: 519; Referee: Matthew Scholes |
| | Penalties |
| | Mellon (penalty scored); Sanderson (penalty scored); Turhan (penalty scored); Marçal (penalty missed); Earley (penalty missed); Taylor (penalty scored) | | (penalty scored) Casey; (penalty scored) Sani; (penalty scored) White; (penalty missed) Vally; (penalty missed) Cavell; (penalty missed) Evans |

==== Group C ====
| Pos | Div | Team | Pld | W | PW | PL | L | GF | GA | GD | Pts | Qualification |
|---|---|---|---|---|---|---|---|---|---|---|---|---|
| 1 | L1 | Wycombe Wanderers | 3 | 2 | 0 | 1 | 0 | 7 | 3 | +4 | 7 | Advance to Round 2 |
| 2 | ACA | Chelsea U21 | 3 | 1 | 1 | 0 | 1 | 5 | 4 | +1 | 5 | Advance to Round 2 |
| 3 | L1 | Reading | 3 | 0 | 1 | 1 | 1 | 3 | 5 | −2 | 3 | |
| 4 | L2 | Bristol Rovers | 3 | 0 | 1 | 1 | 1 | 5 | 8 | −3 | 3 | |

Source: EFL

| 18 August 2026 | Reading | 1–1 (3–1 p) | Wycombe Wanderers | Reading |
| 19:00 BST | Fraser 76' | Report | Quitirna 71' | Stadium: Madejski Stadium; Attendance: 2,652; Referee: Isaac Searle |
| | Penalties |
| | Savage (penalty scored); Fraser (penalty scored); Lane (penalty scored) | | (penalty missed) Tezgel; (penalty scored) Boyd-Munce; (penalty missed) Hagelskjær; (penalty missed) Leahy |

| 25 August 2026 | Bristol Rovers | 2–2 (2–4 p) | Chelsea U21 | Bristol |
| 19:00 BST | Rijks 22'; Quigley 58' | Report | Bettoni 71'; Ezenwata 82' | Stadium: Memorial Stadium; Attendance: 2,405; Referee: Ross Martin |
| | Penalties |
| | Harrison (penalty scored); Sparkes (penalty missed); Russell-Denny (penalty scored); Smallwood (penalty missed) | | (penalty scored) Ezenwata; (penalty missed) Waite; (penalty scored) Bettoni; (penalty scored) Richards; (penalty scored) Osagie |

| 15 September 2026 | Wycombe Wanderers | 2–1 | Chelsea U21 | High Wycombe |
| 19:00 BST | Keita 66'; Boyd-Munce 85' | Report | Bettoni 90+2' | Stadium: Adams Park; Attendance: 778; Referee: Ben Atkinson |

| 6 October 2026 | Wycombe Wanderers | 4–1 | Bristol Rovers | High Wycombe |
| 19:00 BST | Mothersille 4'; Tezgel 22', 87'; Woodrow 33' | Report | Harrison 73' | Stadium: Adams Park; Attendance: 656; Referee: Harrison Blair |

| 13 October 2026 | Reading | 0–2 | Chelsea U21 | Reading |
| 19:00 BST | | Report | Ezenwata 21', 25' | Stadium: Madejski Stadium; Attendance: 1,667; Referee: George Laflin |

| 10 November 2026 | Bristol Rovers | 2–2 (5–3 p) | Reading | Bristol |
| 19:00 GMT | Appiah 58'; Sanyaolu 65' | Report | Patton 3'; Jones 55' | Stadium: Memorial Stadium; Attendance: 1,215; Referee: Oliver Mackey |
| | Penalties |
| | Leigh (penalty scored); Sparkes (penalty scored); De Havilland (penalty scored); Russell-Denny (penalty scored); Salahi-Ali (penalty scored) | | (penalty scored) Patton; (penalty scored) Beacroft; (penalty scored) Sackey; (penalty missed) Dashi |

==== Group D ====
| Pos | Div | Team | Pld | W | PW | PL | L | GF | GA | GD | Pts | Qualification |
|---|---|---|---|---|---|---|---|---|---|---|---|---|
| 1 | L1 | Luton Town | 3 | 2 | 1 | 0 | 0 | 10 | 1 | +9 | 8 | Advance to Round 2 |
| 2 | L1 | Peterborough United | 3 | 2 | 0 | 0 | 1 | 7 | 5 | +2 | 6 | Advance to Round 2 |
| 3 | L2 | Colchester United | 3 | 0 | 1 | 1 | 1 | 2 | 4 | −2 | 3 | |
| 4 | ACA | Ipswich Town U21 | 3 | 0 | 0 | 1 | 2 | 1 | 10 | −9 | 1 | |

Source: EFL

| 22 September 2026 | Luton Town | 6–0 | Ipswich Town U21 | Luton |
| 19:00 BST | Clark 18', 23', 51'; Cole 34'; Johnson 74'; Gawel 86' | Report | | Stadium: Kenilworth Road; Attendance: 2,005; Referee: Callum Walchester |

| 22 September 2026 | Peterborough United | 3–1 | Colchester United | Peterborough |
| 19:00 BST | Edwards 28'; Ashfield 31', 42' | Report | Harvey 79' | Stadium: London Road Stadium; Attendance: 1,853; Referee: Sam Mulhall |

| 3 October 2026 | Colchester United | 1–1 (3–4 p) | Luton Town | Colchester |
| 15:00 BST | Ihionvien 90' | Report | Cole 87' | Stadium: Colchester Community Stadium; Attendance: 2,549; Referee: Dale Baines |
| | Penalties |
| | Ihionvien (penalty scored); Terry (penalty missed); Digby (penalty scored); Williams (penalty scored); Connolly (penalty missed) | | (penalty scored) Clark; (penalty missed) Gore; (penalty scored) Cole; (penalty scored) Richards; (penalty scored) Andersen |

| 6 October 2026 | Peterborough United | 4–1 | Ipswich Town U21 | Peterborough |
| 19:00 BST | Leonard 26' (pen.), 31'; Ashfield 28'; Williams 35' | Report | Fletcher 51' | Stadium: London Road Stadium; Attendance: 1,997; Referee: Matthew Norton |

| 10 November 2026 | Colchester United | 0–0 (4–3 p) | Ipswich Town U21 | Colchester |
| 19:45 GMT | | Report | | Stadium: Colchester Community Stadium; Attendance: 975; Referee: Richie Watkins |
| | Penalties |
| | Digby (penalty scored); Williams (penalty scored); Vincent-Young (penalty missed); Akande (penalty scored); Oni (penalty scored) | | (penalty missed) Turner; (penalty scored) Mazionis; (penalty scored) Fletcher; (penalty missed) Pitts; (penalty scored) Runham |

| 17 November 2026 | Luton Town | 3–0 | Peterborough United | Luton |
| 19:00 GMT | Clark 16'; Wells 45+7'; Cole 62' | Report | | Stadium: Kenilworth Road; Attendance: 2,858; Referee: Niall Smith |

==== Group E ====
| Pos | Div | Team | Pld | W | PW | PL | L | GF | GA | GD | Pts | Qualification |
|---|---|---|---|---|---|---|---|---|---|---|---|---|
| 1 | L1 | Plymouth Argyle | 3 | 2 | 1 | 0 | 0 | 9 | 4 | +5 | 8 | Advance to Round 2 |
| 2 | ACA | Crystal Palace U21 | 3 | 2 | 0 | 0 | 1 | 5 | 7 | −2 | 6 | Advance to Round 2 |
| 3 | L2 | Newport County | 3 | 1 | 0 | 1 | 1 | 5 | 4 | +1 | 4 | |
| 4 | L2 | Swindon Town | 3 | 0 | 0 | 0 | 3 | 2 | 6 | −4 | 0 | |

Source: EFL

| 15 September 2026 | Swindon Town | 1–2 | Crystal Palace U21 | Swindon |
| 19:00 BST | Hackford 23' | Report | Kporha 45+1'; Williams 55' | Stadium: County Ground; Attendance: 1,433; Referee: Aaron Farmer |

| 22 September 2026 | Plymouth Argyle | 5–1 | Crystal Palace U21 | Plymouth |
| 19:00 BST | Amaechi 11'; Watts 26', 37'; Campbell 66'; Pepple 84' | Report | Martin 57' | Stadium: Home Park; Attendance: 2,187; Referee: Matthew Norton |

| 22 September 2026 | Swindon Town | 0–2 | Newport County | Swindon |
| 19:00 BST | | Report | Garner 4'; Nyakuhwa 80' | Stadium: County Ground; Attendance: 1,368; Referee: Declan Bourne (England) |

| 6 October 2026 | Newport County | 2–2 (4–5 p) | Plymouth Argyle | Newport |
| 19:00 BST | Evans 3'; Bamba 59' (pen.) | Report | Pepple 75'; Bakinson 90' | Stadium: Rodney Parade; Attendance: 1,697; Referee: Niall Smith |
| | Penalties |
| | Adu-Poku (penalty missed); Biggins (penalty scored); Jacob (penalty scored); Doidge (penalty scored); Lewis (penalty scored) | | (penalty scored) White; (penalty scored) Irow; (penalty scored) Amaechi; (penalty scored) Pepple; (penalty scored) Ibrahim |

| 3 November 2026 | Newport County | 1–2 | Crystal Palace U21 | Newport |
| 19:00 GMT | Crole 51' | Report | Judd 10'; Angibeaud 79' | Stadium: Rodney Parade; Attendance: 975; Referee: Scott Jackson |

| 10 November 2026 | Plymouth Argyle | 2–1 | Swindon Town | Plymouth |
| 19:00 GMT | Curtis 27' (pen.); Campbell 90+9' | Report | Hackford 35' | Stadium: Home Park; Attendance: 2,508; Referee: Lewis Sandoe |

==== Group F ====
| Pos | Div | Team | Pld | W | PW | PL | L | GF | GA | GD | Pts | Qualification |
|---|---|---|---|---|---|---|---|---|---|---|---|---|
| 1 | L2 | Barnet | 3 | 2 | 1 | 0 | 0 | 9 | 3 | +6 | 8 | Advance to Round 2 |
| 2 | ACA | Arsenal U21 | 3 | 2 | 0 | 0 | 1 | 5 | 7 | −2 | 6 | Advance to Round 2 |
| 3 | L1 | AFC Wimbledon | 3 | 0 | 0 | 2 | 1 | 2 | 3 | −1 | 2 | |
| 4 | L1 | Leyton Orient | 3 | 0 | 1 | 0 | 2 | 4 | 7 | −3 | 2 | |

Source: EFL

| 18 August 2026 | Barnet | 5–1 | Arsenal U21 | Edgware |
| 19:45 BST | Siaw 9'; Maskell 25'; Knowles 45+2', 56', 69' | Report | Knowles 36' (o.g.) | Stadium: The Hive Stadium; Attendance: 1,507; Referee: Stephen Parkinson |

| 18 August 2026 | Leyton Orient | 1–1 (6–5 p) | AFC Wimbledon | Leyton |
| 19:00 BST | Kabia 89' | Report | Stockley 25' | Stadium: Brisbane Road; Attendance: 1,723; Referee: Kirsty Dowle |
| | Penalties |
| | Kabia (penalty scored); Springett (penalty scored); Chinedu (penalty scored); Wellens (penalty scored); Akhamrich (penalty scored); Forrester (penalty scored) | | (penalty scored) Sasu; (penalty scored) Smith; (penalty scored) Hippolyte; (penalty scored) Seddon; (penalty scored) Tilley; (penalty missed) Ogundere |

| 15 September 2026 | Leyton Orient | 1–2 | Arsenal U21 | Leyton |
| 19:00 BST | Oyekunle 25' | Report | Stevens 45'; Harriman-Annous 81' | Stadium: Brisbane Road; Attendance: 675; Referee: George Laflin |

| 6 October 2026 | AFC Wimbledon | 0–0 (7–8 p) | Barnet | Wimbledon |
| 19:00 BST | Seddon (yellow card) 23'; Yiadom (yellow card) 62'; Smith (red card) 77' | Report | Liwala-Lukizalamu (yellow card) 23'; Willams (yellow card) 77' | Stadium: The Cherry Red Records Stadium; Attendance: 1,363 (309 away); Referee: Callum Winchester |
| | Penalties |
| | Nelson (penalty scored); Seddon (penalty scored); Harrison (penalty scored); Ogundere (penalty scored); Hedges (penalty scored); Kirby (penalty scored); Horan (penalty missed); Leach (penalty scored); Goma (penalty missed) | | Willams (penalty scored); Maskell (penalty scored); Kanu (penalty scored); Noel-Williams (penalty scored); Ajayi (penalty scored); Kenlock (penalty scored); Knowles (penalty missed); Ofoborh (penalty scored); Crichlow (penalty scored) |

| 27 October 2026 | AFC Wimbledon | 1–2 | Arsenal U21 | Wimbledon |
| 19:00 GMT | Maycock 48' | Report | Mooney 72'; Nwaneri 87' | Stadium: The Cherry Red Records Stadium; Attendance: 3,050; Referee: James Durkin |

| 10 November 2026 | Barnet | 4–2 | Leyton Orient | Edgware |
| 19:00 GMT | Maskell 33'; Smith 45+1'; Springett 59' (o.g.); Siaw 65' | Report | Morris 43'; Scarlett 86' | Stadium: The Hive Stadium; Attendance: 770; Referee: Scott Jackson |

==== Group G ====
| Pos | Div | Team | Pld | W | PW | PL | L | GF | GA | GD | Pts | Qualification |
|---|---|---|---|---|---|---|---|---|---|---|---|---|
| 1 | L1 | Cambridge United | 3 | 3 | 0 | 0 | 0 | 12 | 2 | +10 | 9 | Advance to Round 2 |
| 2 | L2 | Gillingham | 3 | 2 | 0 | 0 | 1 | 7 | 8 | −1 | 6 | Advance to Round 2 |
| 3 | ACA | Brighton & Hove Albion U21 | 3 | 1 | 0 | 0 | 2 | 6 | 10 | −4 | 3 | |
| 4 | L2 | Northampton Town | 3 | 0 | 0 | 0 | 3 | 2 | 7 | −5 | 0 | |

Source: EFL

| 18 August 2026 | Northampton Town | 0–3 | Brighton & Hove Albion U21 | Northampton |
| 19:00 BST | | Report | Tasker 8'; Doyle 14'; O'Mahony 52' | Stadium: Sixfields Stadium; Attendance: 1,026; Referee: Simon Mather |

| 22 September 2026 | Gillingham | 1–4 | Cambridge United | Gillingham |
| 19:00 BST | Dayal 31' | Report | Bradshaw 24'; Mpanzu 34'; Appéré 57'; Heath 87' (pen.) | Stadium: MEMS Priestfield Stadium; Attendance: 911; Referee: George Laflin |

| 6 October 2026 | Cambridge United | 2–1 | Northampton Town | Cambridge |
| 19:00 BST | Mpanzu 29'; Ahadme 62' (pen.) | Report | Warhurst 51' | Stadium: Cledara Abbey Stadium; Attendance: 888; Referee: Aaron Farmer |

| 13 October 2026 | Gillingham | 4–3 | Brighton & Hove Albion U21 | Gillingham |
| 19:00 BST | Eaves 32' (pen.); Dack 39'; Coleman 45+1'; Dayal 49' | Report | Nti 51', 70'; Silsby 90+4' | Stadium: MEMS Priestfield Stadium; Attendance: 576; Referee: Richard Eley |

| 3 November 2026 | Cambridge United | 6–0 | Brighton & Hove Albion U21 | Cambridge |
| 19:00 GMT | Heath 40' (pen.); Bangura-Williams 43'; Efobi 50'; Stead 54', 68'; Ferdinand 65' (o.g.) | Report | | Stadium: Cledara Abbey Stadium; Attendance: 556; Referee: Craig Hicks |

| 10 November 2026 | Northampton Town | 1–2 | Gillingham | Northampton |
| 19:00 GMT | Sillah 12'; Antwi 54' | Report | List 47' | Stadium: Sixfields Stadium; Attendance: 667; Referee: Alex Chilowicz |

==== Group H ====
| Pos | Div | Team | Pld | W | PW | PL | L | GF | GA | GD | Pts | Qualification |
|---|---|---|---|---|---|---|---|---|---|---|---|---|
| 1 | L1 | Milton Keynes Dons | 3 | 3 | 0 | 0 | 0 | 13 | 3 | +10 | 9 | Advance to Round 2 |
| 2 | ACA | Brentford U21 | 3 | 2 | 0 | 0 | 1 | 4 | 8 | −4 | 6 | Advance to Round 2 |
| 3 | L2 | Crawley Town | 3 | 1 | 0 | 0 | 2 | 6 | 6 | 0 | 3 | |
| 4 | L1 | Bromley | 3 | 0 | 0 | 0 | 3 | 1 | 7 | −6 | 0 | |

Source: EFL

| 22 September 2026 | Milton Keynes Dons | 4–1 | Crawley Town | Milton Keynes |
| 19:00 BST | Wiles 42'; Sanders 45'; Campbell 61'; Hepburn-Murphy 70' (pen.) | Report | Tinsdale 90+1' | Stadium: Stadium MK; Attendance: 1,145; Referee: Aaron Farmer |

| 22 September 2026 | Bromley | 0–1 | Brentford U21 | Bromley |
| 19:30 BST | | Report | Shield 85' | Stadium: Hayes Lane; Attendance: 278; Referee: Harrison Blair |

| 6 October 2026 | Milton Keynes Dons | 7–1 | Brentford U21 | Milton Keynes |
| 19:00 BST | Goode 28'; Collins 45+4', 45+13', 48'; Fullah 52'; Nombe 72'; Troso 78' | Report | Giscombe 89' | Stadium: Stadium MK; Attendance: 824; Referee: Gareth Thomas |

| 6 October 2026 | Crawley Town | 4–0 | Bromley | Crawley |
| 19:45 BST | Patten 35' (o.g.); Duke-McKenna 48', 90+1'; Porter 51' (o.g.) | Report | | Stadium: Broadfield Stadium; Attendance: 1,408; Referee: Sam Mulhall |

| 10 November 2026 | Bromley | 1–2 | Milton Keynes Dons | Bromley |
| 19:30 GMT | Kabamba 22' | Report | Paterson 27'; Burke 51' | Stadium: Hayes Lane; Referee: Matthew Norton |

| 10 November 2026 | Crawley Town | 1–2 | Brentford U21 | Crawley |
| 19:30 GMT | Wickham 90+2' (pen.) | Report | Bobb-Semple 27', 51' | Stadium: Broadfield Stadium; Attendance: 819; Referee: Sunny Sukhvir Gill |
