= 2025–26 Professional U18 Development League =

U18 Premier League
- Season: 2025–26
- Dates: 16 August 2025 – 16 May 2026
- Champions: Chelsea (3rd title)
- UEFA Youth League: Chelsea
- Matches: 392
- Goals: 1,620 (4.13 per match)
- Best player: JJ Gabriel (Manchester United)
- Top goalscorer: Teddie Lamb (Manchester City) (25 goals)
- Biggest home win: Middlesbrough 9–0 Blackburn Rovers (18 April 2026)
- Biggest away win: Birmingham City 0–8 Crystal Palace (16 August 2025)
- Highest scoring: Liverpool 3–8 Blackburn Rovers (20 September 2025); Burnley 7–4 Leeds United (9 May 2026); Ipswich Town 3–8 Aston Villa (9 May 2026)
- Longest winning run: 9 matches Chelsea (21 March 2026 – 9 May 2026)
- Longest unbeaten run: 13 matches Chelsea (23 August 2025 – 31 January 2026)
- Longest winless run: 12 matches Stoke City (18 October 2025 – 14 February 2026)
- Longest losing run: 10 matches Stoke City (18 October 2025 – 31 January 2026)
- (Note: All statistics do not include play-off matches)

The 2025–26 Professional U18 Development League was the 14th season of the Professional Development League system.

29 teams competed, divided into the North and South divisions based on region. Birmingham City and Burnley returned to the U18 Premier League after a three-season absence, while founding member Ipswich Town returned to the top flight for the first time in 13 years. Burnley played in the North Division, while Birmingham City and Ipswich Town played in the South Division.

== North ==
Pos	Team	Pld	W	D	L	GF	GA	GD	Pts	
1	Manchester City (C)	26	19	3	4	96	39	+57	60	Qualification for the National Final
2	Manchester United	26	18	2	6	65	24	+41	56	
3	Newcastle United	26	16	1	9	55	44	+11	49	
4	Everton	26	13	3	10	54	45	+9	42	
5	Nottingham Forest	26	13	3	10	50	47	+3	42	
6	Sunderland	26	11	6	9	56	44	+12	39	
7	Middlesbrough	26	12	3	11	45	45	0	39	
8	Liverpool	26	11	2	13	70	70	0	35	
9	Blackburn Rovers	26	9	6	11	51	68	−17	33	
10	Derby County	26	10	2	14	44	67	−23	32	
11	Burnley	26	9	3	14	49	68	−19	30	
12	Leeds United	26	8	5	13	47	68	−21	29	
13	Wolverhampton Wanderers	26	5	5	16	29	55	−26	20	
14	Stoke City	26	5	2	19	42	69	−27	17	

Source: League Under 18 Table
(C) Champions

=== Matches ===
Home \ Away	BLB	BUR	DER	EVE	LEE	LIV	MNC	MNU	MID	NEW	NFO	STK	SUN	WOL
Blackburn Rovers	—	2–2	1–2	1–1	4–1	1–1	0–5	0–0	6–2	3–2	4–2	3–2	3–1	0–1
Burnley	6–0	—	1–2	0–5	7–4	1–6	2–2	1–2	2–3	1–3	3–5	3–2	2–0	1–1
Derby County	1–3	1–2	—	1–3	2–3	4–3	3–1	0–4	0–0	3–1	0–2	0–3	2–2	2–1
Everton	4–0	0–1	1–4	—	1–1	2–1	5–3	0–1	1–2	4–2	3–2	2–3	2–1	2–1
Leeds United	2–1	2–5	4–0	5–3	—	0–3	1–1	0–2	3–2	3–3	1–2	0–3	2–2	4–1
Liverpool	3–8	7–1	4–2	1–3	6–1	—	0–3	0–7	1–2	3–4	3–6	4–2	3–5	3–3
Manchester City	7–3	5–0	5–3	2–1	5–0	2–3	—	1–3	5–0	3–1	6–0	4–4	4–1	7–0
Manchester United	3–0	1–0	6–1	1–3	0–0	4–1	2–4	—	5–0	3–0	5–2	3–1	0–1	3–1
Middlesbrough	9–0	5–2	3–2	0–0	1–2	0–1	0–2	1–2	—	0–4	2–1	3–0	1–1	3–1
Newcastle United	3–0	2–1	5–0	3–1	3–2	0–1	3–5	2–0	2–1	—	2–1	1–3	1–0	2–1
Nottingham Forest	2–1	3–0	1–2	1–0	2–1	3–4	0–4	2–1	2–0	0–1	—	1–1	4–0	2–2
Stoke City	0–1	1–2	4–5	3–5	2–1	1–5	2–3	1–2	0–2	1–2	0–2	—	0–4	1–3
Sunderland	5–5	1–2	3–0	4–0	5–1	4–3	1–2	2–1	0–1	4–1	1–1	6–2	—	1–0
Wolverhampton Wanderers	1–1	3–1	1–2	1–2	2–3	1–0	1–5	0–4	0–2	0–2	0–1	2–0	1–1	—

Source: Premier League Under 18 Results
Legend: Blue = home team win; Yellow = draw; Red = away team win.

== South ==
Pos	Team	Pld	W	D	L	GF	GA	GD	Pts	
1	Chelsea (C)	28	21	4	3	88	24	+64	67	Qualification for the National Final
2	Tottenham Hotspur	28	16	6	6	70	36	+34	54	
3	Aston Villa	28	17	3	8	82	55	+27	54	
4	Brighton & Hove Albion	28	14	7	7	63	41	+22	49	
5	Crystal Palace	28	14	4	10	74	52	+22	46	
6	West Bromwich Albion	28	14	4	10	68	50	+18	46	
7	Southampton	28	13	3	12	65	61	+4	42	
8	West Ham United	28	13	2	13	62	59	+3	41	
9	Leicester City	28	10	6	12	46	53	−7	36	
10	Arsenal	28	9	6	13	46	57	−11	33	
11	Fulham	28	9	6	13	48	65	−17	33	
12	Norwich City	28	6	8	14	47	67	−20	26	
13	Reading	28	6	8	14	38	66	−28	26	
14	Birmingham City	28	6	3	19	29	88	−59	21	
15	Ipswich Town	28	6	2	20	41	93	−52	20	

Source: Premier League Under 18 Table
(C) Champions

=== Matches ===
Home \ Away	ARS	AVL	BIR	BHA	CHE	CRY	FUL	IPS	LEI	NOR	REA	SOU	TOT	WBA	WHU
Arsenal	—	2–6	3–1	0–3	1–1	2–3	2–2	4–2	1–2	1–4	1–2	3–2	1–4	2–3	3–4
Aston Villa	1–2	—	6–0	1–4	2–1	3–1	3–3	5–1	0–4	2–2	1–0	5–2	2–1	0–3	3–1
Birmingham City	0–2	1–5	—	0–2	0–4	0–8	2–1	4–3	0–4	2–1	0–1	2–1	1–4	2–8	1–2
Brighton & Hove Albion	2–2	0–2	1–1	—	0–3	4–0	5–0	3–2	3–3	5–2	3–1	2–3	4–1	0–2	3–1
Chelsea	4–0	6–1	3–1	4–0	—	2–0	2–3	5–0	5–0	0–0	3–2	3–0	2–2	0–1	4–2
Crystal Palace	2–2	1–2	5–0	0–0	2–4	—	4–0	8–0	4–2	4–2	2–0	4–2	1–1	1–3	3–2
Fulham	2–1	2–5	3–4	2–3	1–5	2–2	—	4–0	2–1	4–0	5–1	2–5	0–5	3–0	1–1
Ipswich Town	1–0	3–8	3–0	1–2	0–3	3–6	3–0	—	3–1	3–0	1–1	1–3	1–2	0–5	2–8
Leicester City	1–1	2–2	0–2	2–1	1–5	1–0	1–2	2–1	—	1–3	1–1	2–1	0–3	1–1	3–1
Norwich City	1–2	2–3	5–1	2–2	1–3	3–1	2–2	2–1	3–6	—	2–2	1–1	0–2	0–3	2–5
Reading	0–3	2–7	2–2	0–4	1–3	2–4	0–1	2–2	1–3	1–1	—	1–3	2–2	2–1	2–1
Southampton	1–0	4–3	3–0	2–2	0–6	1–3	0–0	5–1	3–1	2–3	5–0	—	4–2	6–3	2–0
Tottenham Hotspur	2–2	1–0	4–0	1–3	1–1	2–3	1–0	4–0	2–0	3–0	2–2	4–1	—	5–2	1–2
West Bromwich Albion	0–1	2–3	3–1	0–0	1–4	4–0	5–0	5–1	1–1	1–1	2–5	2–1	2–3	—	1–5
West Ham United	1–2	2–1	1–1	3–2	1–2	3–2	2–1	1–2	1–0	4–2	1–2	5–2	0–5	2–4	—

Source: Premier League Under 18 Results
Legend: Blue = home team win; Yellow = draw; Red = away team win.

==== National Final ====
22 May 2026
19:00 UTC+1

Chelsea	5–1	Manchester City
Ezenwata 7'; Eboué 9'; Kavuma-McQueen 37', 90+14'; Gordon 90'	Report	McAidoo 18'

Stamford Bridge, Fulham
Referee: Kane Dempster

=== Top goalscorers ===
Rank	Player	Club	Goals
1	(England) Teddie Lamb	Manchester City	25
2	(England) JJ Gabriel	Manchester United	23
3	(England) Markie Meade	Aston Villa	19
4	(England) Josh Sonni-Lambie	Liverpool	16
5	(England) Chizaram Ezenwata	Chelsea	15
5	(England) Harry French	West Bromwich Albion	15
5	(England) Lorenz Hutchinson	Leicester City	15
5	(England) Christian Dunbar-McDonald	Manchester City	15
5	(Albania) Armend Muslika	Tottenham Hotspur	15
10	(England) David Angibeaud	Crystal Palace	14
10	(England) Oliver Boast	Tottenham Hotspur	14
10	(England) Andre Dike	West Ham United	14

=== Hat-tricks ===
Player	For	Against	Result	Date	Ref.
(England) Benjamin Casey	Crystal Palace	Tottenham Hotspur	2–3 (A)	30 August 2025	
(England) JJ Gabriel	Manchester United	Derby County	0–4 (A)	30 August 2025	
(England) Harry Gathercole	Southampton	West Bromwich Albion	6–3 (H)	30 August 2025	
(England) Lorenz Hutchinson	Leicester City	Aston Villa	0–4 (A)	13 September 2025	
(England) Benjamin Casey	Crystal Palace	Ipswich Town	8–0 (H)	13 September 2025	
(England) Freddie Leatherbarrow	Blackburn Rovers	Liverpool	3–8 (A)	20 September 2025	
(England) Rio Parmar ^{4}	West Bromwich Albion	Birmingham City	2–8 (A)	20 September 2025	
(Wales) Isaac Thomas ^{4}	West Ham United	Ipswich Town	2–8 (A)	1 November 2025	
(England) Teddie Lamb	Manchester City	Burnley	5–0 (H)	1 November 2025	
(England) Marley Mintus	Derby County	Stoke City	4–5 (A)	1 November 2025	
(England) Kallum Fuller-Thompson ^{4}	Reading	West Bromwich Albion	0–5 (A)	1 November 2025	
(England) Riko Robinson	Nottingham Forest	Liverpool	3–6 (A)	8 November 2025	
(England) JJ Gabriel	Manchester United	Liverpool	0–7 (A)	29 November 2025	
(Guyana) Reiss Elliott-Parris	Tottenham Hotspur	Fulham	0–5 (A)	20 December 2025	
(England) Jephthah Medine	West Ham United	Norwich City	4–2 (H)	10 January 2026	
(Morocco) Ibrahim Rabbaj	Chelsea	Leicester City	1–5 (A)	17 January 2026	
(England) Josh Sonni-Lambie	Liverpool	Burnley	7–1 (H)	24 January 2026	
(England) Harvey Higgins	Blackburn Rovers	Middlesbrough	6–2 (H)	31 January 2026	
(England) Joshua Abe	Liverpool	Leeds United	6–1 (H)	14 February 2026	
(England) Teddie Lamb	Manchester City	Wolverhampton Wanderers	7–0 (H)	17 February 2026	
(England) Levi Ball	Blackburn Rovers	Sunderland	5–5 (A)	18 February 2026	
(England) Oliver Boast	Tottenham Hotspur	Birmingham City	1–4 (A)	7 March 2026	
(England) Mylo Bernard	Crystal Palace	Reading	2–4 (A)	14 March 2026	
(England) Israel Green	Derby County	Everton	1–4 (A)	17 March 2026	
(England) Reggie Walsh	Chelsea	Fulham	1–5 (A)	18 April 2026	
(England) Tyler Smith	Middlesbrough	Blackburn Rovers	9–0 (H)	18 April 2026	
(England) Kylan Midwood	Manchester City	Derby County	5–3 (H)	2 May 2026	
(Australia) Marcus Neill	Sunderland	Everton	4–0 (H)	5 May 2026	
(England) Warren Taylor	Burnley	Leeds United	7–4 (H)	9 May 2026	
(Scotland) Ceiran Loney	Everton	Manchester City	5–3 (H)	9 May 2026	
(England) Markie Meade	Aston Villa	Ipswich Town	2–6 (A)	9 May 2026	
(Albania) Armend Muslika^{4}	Tottenham Hotspur	West Bromwich Albion	5–2 (H)	12 May 2026	

Note

(H) – Home; (A) – Away
^{4} – player scored 4 goals

== Professional Development League ==
U18 Professional Development League 2
- Season: 2025–26
- Dates: 8 August 2025 – 2 May 2026
- Champions: Charlton Athletic (4th Title)
- Matches: 283 (280 RS, 3 PO)
- Goals: 1,163 (4.11 per match) (1154 RS, 9 PO)
- Top goalscorer: Dan Gelhardt Wigan Athletic (20 Goals) (19 RS, 1 PO)
- Biggest home win: Swansea City 9–0 Bristol City (1 November 2025)
- Biggest away win: Wigan Athletic 0–5 Brentford (20 September 2025); Fleetwood Town 0–5 Hull City (25 October 2025); Sheffield Wednesday 0–5 Sheffield United (8 November 2025); Queens Park Rangers 2–7 Swansea City (13 December 2025)
- Highest scoring: Brentford 7–5 Huddersfield Town (21 March 2026)
- Longest winning run: 7 matches Charlton Athletic (23 August 2025 – 25 October 2025)
- Longest unbeaten run: 14 matches Charlton Athletic (9 August 2025 – 17 January 2026)
- Longest winless run: 13 matches Sheffield Wednesday (24 January 2026 – 1 May 2026)
- Longest losing run: 7 matches Coventry City (9 August 2025 – 27 September 2025)

The Professional Development League, sometimes known as the Professional Development League 2, is Under-18 football's second tier, designed for those academies with Category 2 status. The league is split regionally into north and south divisions, with each team facing opponents in their own region twice, both home and away, and opponents in the other region once, resulting in 28 games played. The sides finishing in the top two positions in both regions at the end of the season will progress to a knockout stage to determine the overall league champion. Bristol City are the defending champions.

20 teams competed in the league this season, two fewer than the previous season. Three teams joined with Category One status with Birmingham City, Burnley returning after a three-season absence and six total seasons and founding member Ipswich Town playing in the Premier League 2 for the very first time after 13 seasons. However, Huddersfield Town returned after being granted category 2 academy status after 7 years.

=== Tables ===
==== North Division ====
Pos	Team	Pld	W	D	L	GF	GA	GD	Pts	Qualification
1	Wigan Athletic (R)	28	18	4	6	66	42	+24	58	Qualification for Knock-out stage
2	Hull City	28	16	2	10	65	53	+12	50	Qualification for Knock-out stage
3	Crewe Alexandra	28	13	7	8	62	41	+21	46	
4	Barnsley	28	13	5	10	44	42	+2	44	
5	Sheffield United	28	13	3	12	63	51	+12	42	
6	Fleetwood Town	28	11	2	15	39	59	−20	35	
7	Peterborough United	28	10	3	15	60	77	−17	33	
8	Huddersfield Town	28	7	4	17	55	84	−29	25	
9	Sheffield Wednesday	28	6	5	17	32	65	−33	23	
10	Coventry City	28	6	3	19	46	68	−22	21	

Source: Professional Development League table
(R) Regional League Champions

==== South Division ====
Pos	Team	Pld	W	D	L	GF	GA	GD	Pts	Qualification
1	Charlton Athletic (R, C)	28	19	6	3	77	29	+48	63	Qualification for Knock-out stage
2	Millwall	28	15	6	7	52	38	+14	51	Qualification for Knock-out stage
3	AFC Bournemouth	28	16	2	10	75	55	+20	50	
4	Brentford	28	15	3	10	77	58	+19	48	
5	Cardiff City	28	15	3	10	66	51	+15	48	
6	Watford	28	13	5	10	73	58	+15	44	
7	Swansea City	28	12	3	13	66	65	+1	39	
8	Bristol City	28	11	4	13	41	64	−23	37	
9	Colchester United	28	7	4	17	49	78	−29	25	
10	Queens Park Rangers	28	4	6	18	46	76	−30	18	

Source: Professional Development League table
(C) Champions; (R) Regional League Champions

=== Matches ===
Home \ Away	BAR	COV	CRE	FLE	HUD	HUL	PET	SHU	SHW	WIG	BOU	BRE	BRI	CAR	CHA	COL	MIL	QPR	SWA	WAT
Barnsley	—	2–1	0–0	4–0	3–0	4–0	1–1	0–2	0–3	3–3	3–2	—	3–2	—	2–1	—	0–4	—	1–0	—
Coventry City	3–3	—	3–2	0–1	5–1	4–6	1–0	0–4	3–0	2–5	—	1–2	—	2–4	—	1–2	—	3–3	—	2–5
Crewe Alexandra	2–0	1–2	—	1–2	6–1	3–0	3–1	4–0	4–0	2–2	0–3	—	1–1	—	2–3	—	3–2	—	4–1	—
Fleetwood Town	0–2	2–1	0–2	—	3–3	0–5	0–3	2–0	2–0	2–4	—	7–3	—	1–3	—	1–0	—	4–0	—	3–3
Huddersfield Town	1–2	2–1	1–2	4–2	—	3–1	5–1	1–4	1–3	2–1	1–3	—	2–5	—	0–4	—	1–2	—	2–2	—
Hull City	3–1	3–2	1–1	2–1	3–2	—	3–1	2–1	6–1	4–2	—	0–3	—	2–3	—	3–0	—	6–0	—	3–3
Peterborough United	2–1	4–1	1–5	5–1	2–2	3–2	—	3–5	3–1	2–4	4–7	—	3–5	—	1–1	—	2–1	—	3–4	—
Sheffield United	0–0	2–1	3–3	2–0	1–3	0–2	7–2	—	5–0	4–1	—	1–2	—	0–2	—	3–1	—	3–3	—	2–3
Sheffield Wednesday	1–2	2–2	4–2	0–1	1–3	0–1	0–1	0–5	—	4–1	0–2	—	0–0	—	0–1	—	1–1	—	1–3	—
Wigan Athletic	2–0	2–1	2–0	2–0	3–1	3–0	2–1	2–0	4–0	—	—	0–5	—	4–0	—	4–3	—	1–0	—	0–0
AFC Bournemouth	—	2–0	—	0–2	—	1–3	—	5–2	—	1–4	—	4–2	5–2	2–2	3–4	3–0	1–1	3–1	5–1	1–3
Brentford	2–0	—	3–1	—	7–5	—	4–2	—	2–2	—	0–2	—	8–0	0–3	0–2	3–3	0–1	1–3	4–0	2–3
Bristol City	—	1–0	—	2–0	—	0–2	—	3–0	—	0–3	2–1	3–4	—	2–1	0–1	2–2	0–2	3–1	0–1	3–2
Cardiff City	4–2	—	1–1	—	6–2	—	0–1	—	3–4	—	0–3	3–1	0–1	—	1–1	5–0	1–2	4–3	3–1	4–1
Charlton Athletic	—	3–0	—	3–0	—	4–1	—	5–0	—	1–1	4–1	3–3	3–0	5–1	—	6–0	4–0	1–1	5–0	1–4
Colchester United	2–1	—	1–3	—	4–2	—	4–2	—	1–1	—	2–4	2–3	1–2	1–4	3–3	—	4–2	3–2	3–5	1–2
Millwall	—	3–2	—	1–2	—	2–0	—	0–3	—	3–1	2–1	1–0	3–0	2–0	1–2	3–1	—	2–0	2–2	4–4
Queens Park Rangers	1–2	—	1–2	—	2–2	—	2–5	—	2–3	—	5–1	2–5	2–2	0–2	1–2	4–1	2–2	—	2–7	0–3
Swansea City	—	1–2	—	4–0	—	5–1	—	1–4	—	1–3	4–7	0–2	9–0	3–0	3–1	2–3	1–1	0–3	—	2–1
Watford	0–2	—	2–2	—	5–2	—	5–1	—	4–0	—	1–2	4–6	4–0	4–6	0–3	2–1	0–2	3–0	2–3	—

Source: Premier League Under 18 Results
Legend: Blue = home team win; Yellow = draw; Red = away team win.

=== Knock-out stage ===
Semi-finals

7 May 2026
13:00

Wigan Athletic	1–0	Millwall
Gelhardt 7'

Brick Community Stadium, Wigan
9 May 2026
15:00

Charlton Athletic	4–1	Hull City
Washington-Amoah 56'; Richman 58'; Podogorny 75'; Peterkin 90+4'		Gomeniuk 29'

The Valley, Charlton

Professional Development League National Final

15 May 2026
19:00 GMT

Charlton Athletic	3–0	Wigan Athletic
McMillan 26'; Richman 86', 90+8'	Report

The Valley, Charlton
Attendance: 747

=== Top goalscorers ===
Rank	Player	Club	Goals
1	(England) Dan Gelhardt	Wigan Athletic	20
3	(England) Kymani Smith-Daley	Watford	18
3	(Wales) Jack Sykes	Cardiff City	18
4	(England) Leyland Waite	AFC Bournemouth	17
5	(Eritrea) Siem Eyob-Abraha	Sheffield United	14
6	(England) Benji McWilliams-Marcano	Peterborough United	13
6	(England) Raynon Richman	Charlton Athletic	13
6	(England) Bolu Shofowoke	Peterborough United	13
9	(Wales) Mannie Barton	Cardiff City	12
9	(Wales) Harvey Gray	Swansea City	12
9	(Wales) Zac Jagielka	Hull City	12
9	(England) Ellis McMillan	Charlton Athletic	12

=== Hat-tricks ===
Player	For	Against	Result	Date	Ref.
(Wales) Zac Jagielka^{4}	Hull City	Queens Park Rangers	6–0 (H)	20 September 2025	
(England) Bolu Shofowoke	Peterborough United	Coventry City	4–1 (H)	27 September 2025	
(England) Charlie Liddell	Sheffield Wednesday	Wigan Athletic	4–1 (H)	17 October 2025	
(England) Josh Ocaya	Hull City	Sheffield Wednesday	6–1 (H)	6 December 2025	
(England) Will Wright^{4}	Millwall	Watford	4–4 (H)	17 January 2026	
(England) Jacob Hanson	Brentford	Bristol City	8–0 (H)	17 January 2026	
(Republic of Ireland) Joshua Wright	Queens Park Rangers	Colchester United	4–1 (H)	14 February 2026	
(England) Riley McLachlan^{4}	Sheffield United	Peterborough United	3–5 (A)	21 February 2026	
(Wales) Jack Sykes	Cardiff City	Brentford	0–3 (A)	28 February 2026	
(England) Jai Nwosu^{4}	Brentford	Huddersfield Town	7–5 (H)	21 March 2026	
(England) Leyland Waite^{4}	AFC Bournemouth	Swansea City	5–1 (H)	1 April 2026	
(England) Dane Ndimukum	AFC Bournemouth	Peterborough United	4–7 (A)	11 April 2026	

Note

(H) – Home; (A) – Away
^{4} – player scored 4 goals

== EFL Youth Alliance ==
Football League Youth Alliance
- Season: 2025-26
- Champions: Northeast Division; Grimsby Town; North West Division; Shrewsbury Town; South East Division; AFC Wimbledon; South West Division; Oxford United; Play-off Champion; AFC Wimbledon
- Matches: 627
- Goals: 2,371 (3.78 per match)
- Biggest home win: Stevenage 10–1 Cheltenham Town (1 November 2025); Oxford United 9–0 Barnet (1 November 2025)
- Biggest away win: Bristol Rovers 0–9 Stevenage (22 November 2025)
- Highest scoring: Plymouth Argyle 7–5 Cheltenham Town (18 April 2026)
- Longest winning run: 14 games AFC Wimbledon (15 November 2025 – 21 March 2026)
- Longest unbeaten run: 17 games AFC Wimbledon (15 November 2025 – 11 April 2026)
- Longest winless run: 14 games Newport County (13 September 2025 – 21 February 2026)
- Longest losing run: 7 games Exeter City (9 August 2025 – 27 September 2025); Swindon Town (16 August 2025 – 27 September 2025); Notts County (10 October 2025 – 10 January 2026)

League 2 is run by the Football League under the auspices of the Football League Youth Alliance. This is for academies that are Category Three and Four in the EPPP. The competition consists of the Under-18 sides from the Category Three and Category Four Academy Clubs of the EFL and Premier League, along with selected National League Clubs. 42 Academies competed this season, 2 fewer than the previous season. For clubs that get relegated to the National League, they have two years to gain promotion back to the EFL. Otherwise, they lose their license with the League. Hartlepool United and Rochdale did not return after their parent club lost their EPPP license and would not participate this season. For clubs that get relegated to the National League, they have two years to gain promotion back to the EFL. Otherwise, they lose their license with the League. Accrington Stanley closed their academy dues to costs and won't be participating as well, and Morecambe temporarily closed their academy due to being suspended by the National League temporarily, Harrogate Town moved to the National League U19s, and Huddersfield Town academy was upgraded to Category 2 status. Barnet and Oldham Athletic joined after their first team was promoted. In the Academy category front Wrexham was promoted from Category Four to Category Three. Wycombe Wanderers joins the Youth Alliance as a Category Four academy for the first time since 2011/2012. The format returned to the Division format and the winners of the divisions would play in a 4 team playoff to determine the national champion.

=== League stage ===
==== North West Division ====
Pos	Team	Pld	W	D	L	GF	GA	GD	Pts
1	Shrewsbury Town (C)	31	20	4	7	85	50	+35	64
2	Preston North End	31	19	5	7	65	45	+20	62
3	Bolton Wanderers	31	17	4	10	57	41	+16	55
4	Wrexham	31	16	6	9	82	52	+30	54
5	Carlisle United	31	15	4	12	71	59	+12	49
6	Stockport County	31	14	2	15	76	64	+12	44
7	Blackpool	31	12	8	11	58	49	+9	44
8	Salford City	31	12	5	14	59	59	0	41
9	Port Vale	31	12	3	16	52	68	−16	39
10	Oldham Athletic	31	10	6	15	38	56	−18	36
11	Morecambe	31	9	7	15	51	76	−25	34
12	Walsall	31	8	3	20	42	70	−28	27

Source: soccerway.com
(C) Champions

==== North East Division ====
Pos	Team	Pld	W	D	L	GF	GA	GD	Pts
1	Grimsby Town (C)	28	17	8	3	62	31	+31	59
2	Mansfield Town	28	12	11	5	48	34	+14	47
3	Burton Albion	28	12	3	13	53	64	−11	39
4	Chesterfield	28	10	6	12	39	45	−6	36
5	Lincoln City	28	10	4	14	49	53	−4	34
6	Bradford City	28	10	3	15	43	51	−8	33
7	Doncaster Rovers	28	8	7	13	43	50	−7	31
8	Notts County	28	9	3	16	39	65	−26	30
9	Rotherham United	28	8	2	18	31	61	−30	26

Source: soccerway.com
(C) Champions

==== South West Division ====
Pos	Team	Pld	W	D	L	GF	GA	GD	Pts
1	Oxford United (C)	28	16	5	7	63	37	+26	53
2	Plymouth Argyle	28	13	3	12	53	63	−10	42
3	Swindon Town	28	11	3	14	49	64	−15	36
4	Cheltenham Town	28	11	1	16	52	78	−26	34
5	Exeter City	28	9	4	15	52	62	−10	31
6	Portsmouth	28	9	3	16	48	65	−17	30
7	Bristol Rovers	28	9	2	17	43	88	−45	29
8	Newport County	28	6	6	16	35	58	−23	24
9	Forest Green Rovers	28	6	6	16	35	60	−25	24

Source: soccerway.com
(C) Champions

==== South East Division ====
Pos	Team	Pld	W	D	L	GF	GA	GD	Pts
1	AFC Wimbledon (C)	31	24	3	4	82	26	+56	75
2	Cambridge United	31	19	3	9	81	53	+28	60
3	Luton Town	31	17	6	8	85	54	+31	57
4	Stevenage	31	16	7	8	77	39	+38	55
5	Leyton Orient	31	16	4	11	71	63	+8	52
6	Bromley	31	15	5	11	62	55	+7	50
7	Gillingham	31	15	3	13	66	61	+5	48
8	Wycombe Wanderers	31	12	8	11	59	51	+8	44
9	Sutton United	31	13	4	14	47	48	−1	43
10	Barnet	31	11	7	13	57	72	−15	40
11	Northampton Town	31	10	7	14	53	49	+4	37
12	Milton Keynes Dons	31	5	8	18	49	73	−24	23

Source: soccerway.com
(C) Champions

=== Play-off Stage ===
==== Semifinals ====
EFL Youth Alliance North Final
5 May 2026
19:00 GMT

Grimsby Town	1–3	Shrewsbury Town
Jack 55'		Hall 45+'; Hardeman 88'; Aiston 90+'

Linden Club, Grimsby

EFL Youth Alliance South Final
6 May 2026
12:00 BST

AFC Wimbledon	3–0	Oxford United
Kirby 12'; Ashamu 48'; Kedwell 66'

Kings College Sports Ground, New Malden

==== EFL Youth Alliance National Final ====
10 May 2026
19:45 BST

Shrewsbury Town	0–2	AFC Wimbledon
		Kirby 6' (pen.); Sealey 64'

The Croud Meadow, Shrewsbury
Attendance: 798
