= Chizaram Ezenwata =

English footballer (born 2008)

Personal information
- Full name: Chizaram Nathan-Rowland Ezenwata
- Date of birth: 5 September 2008 (age 18)
- Place of birth: London, England
- Height: 6 ft 2 in (1.87 m)
- Position: Forward

Team information
- Current team: Chelsea
- Number: 62

Youth career
- –2021: Tottenham Hotspur
- 2021–2023: Charlton Athletic
- 2023–: Chelsea

International career^{‡}
Years	Team	Apps	(Gls)
2024–2025	England U17	8	(5)
2025–	England U18	7	(3)
2026–	England U19	6	(3)
- ‡ National team caps and goals as of 22:42, 2 October 2026 (UTC)

Chizaram Nathan-Rowland Ezenwata (born 5 September 2008) is an English professional footballer who plays as a forward for Chelsea.

== Early life ==
Ezenwata was born on 5 September 2008 in London, England to a Cameroonian mother, Mbeng-Nchang Ashu Egbe and a Nigerian father, Endy Ezenwata.

== Club career ==
Ezenwata initially trained at Tottenham Hotspur Academy as a pre-teen and then spent two years with Charlton Athletic. After impressing during his stint there, Ezenwata joined the youth academy of Premier League side Chelsea in 2023.

== International career ==
Ezenwata is an England youth international. During November 2025, he played for England under-17 at the 2025 FIFA U-17 World Cup. He scored a Hat-trick during the group stage victory against Haiti. Ezenwata started their knockout phase victory over South Korea and was then an unused substitute in their next match as England were eliminated at the round of sixteen by Austria.

== Style of play ==
Ezenwata plays as a forward. The Athletic wrote in 2025 that he "is a stocky, muscular striker who uses his body well to hold off defenders... he demonstrated he certainly has an end product to his game".

== Career statistics ==
=== Club ===
As of 27 October 2026

Appearances and goals by club, season and competition
Club	Season	League			FA Cup		EFL Cup		Europe		Other		Total	
Club	Season	Division	Apps	Goals	Apps	Goals	Apps	Goals	Apps	Goals	Apps	Goals	Apps	Goals
Chelsea U21s	2025–26	—			—		—		—		2 (Note: Appearances in EFL Trophy)	0	2	0
Chelsea U21s	2026-27	—			—		—		—		3	3	3	3
Career total			0	0	0	0	0	0	0	0	5	3	5	3

== Honours ==
Chelsea U18

- U18 Premier League – National Champions: 2025–26
- U18 Premier League – Southern Champions: 2025–26
