= Mohamed Keita =

Mohamed Keita may refer to:

- Mohamed Keita (footballer), Guinean footballer
- Mohamed Keita (basketball), Guinean-Burkinabé basketball player

== See also ==
- Muhamed Keita, Norwegian footballer
