= Ryan Kavuma-McQueen =

English footballer (born 2009)

- Kavuma-McQueen in 2026

Personal information
- Full name: Ryan Denis Edward Kavuma-McQueen
- Date of birth: 1 January 2009 (age 17)
- Place of birth: White City, England
- Height: 1.79 m (5 ft 10 in)
- Position: Winger

Team information
- Current team: Portsmouth (on loan from Chelsea)
- Number: 25

Youth career
- Little Foxes
- Shooting Stars
- 2016–2026: Chelsea

Senior career*
Years	Team	Apps	(Gls)
2026–	Chelsea	0	(0)
2026–	→ Portsmouth (loan)	13	(1)

International career^{‡}
2024	England U15	6	(9)
2024–2025	England U16	13	(9)
2025–2026	England U17	6	(8)
2026–	England U18	3	(2)
- * Club domestic league appearances and goals as of 20:07, 1 November 2026 (UTC) ‡ National team caps and goals as of 15:51, 11 October 2026 (UTC)

Ryan Denis Edward Kavuma-McQueen (born 1 January 2009) is an English professional footballer who plays as a winger for EFL Championship club Portsmouth, on loan from Chelsea.

== Early life ==
Kavuma-McQueen was born on 1 January 2009 at Hammersmith Hospital in White City, London. Born in England, he is of Ugandan descent through his parents.

== Club career ==
Kavuma-McQueen joined the youth academy of Premier League side Chelsea at the age of seven, having played for youth clubs Little Foxes and Shooting Stars. During the 2024–25 season, Kavuma-McQueen regularly featured for Chelsea’s U18 side despite still being eligible for the U16 age group. He also made a number of appearances for the club’s U21 team during the same campaign. On 22 October 2025, Kavuma-McQueen was named on the bench for Chelsea’s first team in the UEFA Champions League match against Ajax. It was his first involvement in a senior matchday squad for the club.

As a second-half substitute, Kavuma-McQueen debuted for Chelsea on 4 April 2026 during the 7–0 victory against Port Vale in the FA Cup quarter-finals.

On 14 August 2026, Kavuma-McQueen joined Championship club Portsmouth on loan for the duration of the 2026–27 season.

== International career ==
Kavuma-McQueen is an England youth international although eligible to represent the Uganda national team through his parents. During October 2025, he played for the England national under-17 football team for 2026 UEFA European Under-17 Championship qualification. On 27 September 2026, Kavuma-McQueen scored on his debut for England U18 against Egypt U18 at the UEFA Friendship Cup.

== Career statistics ==
As of 27 October 2026

Appearances and goals by club, season and competition
Club	Season	League			FA Cup		EFL Cup		Europe		Other		Total	
Club	Season	Division	Apps	Goals	Apps	Goals	Apps	Goals	Apps	Goals	Apps	Goals	Apps	Goals
Chelsea U21	2025–26	—			—		—		—		1 (Note: Appearance in EFL Trophy)	0	1	0
Chelsea	2025–26	Premier League	0	0	1	0	0	0	0	0	—		1	0
Chelsea	2026–27	Premier League	0	0	0	0	0	0	—		—		0	0
Chelsea	Total		0	0	1	0	0	0	0	0	—		1	0
Portsmouth (loan)	2026–27	Championship	12	2	0	0	0	0	—		—		12	2
Career total			12	2	1	0	0	0	0	0	1	0	14	2

== Honours ==
Chelsea U18

- U18 Premier League – National Champions: 2025–26
- U18 Premier League – Southern Champions: 2025–26

Chelsea U21

- Premier League 2: 2025–26

Chelsea

- FA Cup runner-up: 2025–26
