= David Angibeaud =

English footballer (born 2007)

Personal information
- Full name: David Alun Angibeaud Montjen
- Date of birth: 23 November 2007 (age 18)
- Position: Striker

Team information
- Current team: Crystal Palace
- Number: 59

Youth career
- 2017: Chelsea
- 2017–2026: Crystal Palace

Senior career*
Years	Team	Apps	(Gls)
2026–	Crystal Palace	0	(0)
- * Club domestic league appearances and goals

David Alun Angibeaud Montjen (born 23 November 2007), commonly known as David Angibeaud, is an English footballer who plays as a striker for Premier League club Crystal Palace.

== Club career ==
=== Crystal Palace ===
Angibeaud joined Crystal Palace's youth set up at under-11 level from Chelsea. During the 2025–26 U18 Premier League season, he scored 14 league goals for the club's under-18 side, finishing as Palace's leading league goalscorer.

On 22 January 2026, Angibeaud scored twice in Palace's 4–0 away victory over Newcastle United in the fourth round of the FA Youth Cup. Palace subsequently advanced to the competition's semi-finals.

On 4 March 2026, Angibeaud scored the only goal in a 1–0 victory against Tottenham Hotspur in the semi-finals of the U18 Premier League Cup, sending Palace into the final. Palace subsequently won the competition, although Angibeaud did not feature in the final.

Angibeaud then progressed to the Palace under-21s during 2026. On 26 October 2026, he made his first under-21 start and scored his first goal at that level in a 5–2 defeat against Southampton in Premier League 2.

On 3 November 2026, Angibeaud scored the winning goal in the 79th minute of a 2–1 victory over Newport County in the EFL Trophy. The result secured Crystal Palace's first qualification for the competition's knockout stage.
