= Miracle Adewole =

German footballer (born 2007)

Personal information
- Full name: Miracle Adetonmiwa Jimoh Elijah Adewole
- Date of birth: 12 October 2007 (age 19)
- Place of birth: Stuttgart, Germany
- Height: 1.75 m (5 ft 9 in)
- Positions: Right-back; right winger

Team information
- Current team: Tottenham Hotspur
- Number: 84

Youth career
- 2014–: Tottenham Hotspur

International career^{‡}
| Years | Team | Apps | (Gls) |
| 2022 | Germany U16 | | |
- ‡ National team caps and goals as of 12 May 2026

Miracle Adetonmiwa Jimoh Elijah Adewole (born 12 October 2007) is a German footballer who plays as a right-back and right winger for Tottenham Hotspur's academy.

== Early life and career ==
Adewole was born in Stuttgart, but moved to England at the age of one. He joined Tottenham Hotspur's academy in 2014, at the age of seven.

Having signed a scholarship deal in July 2024, Adewole made his Tottenham's under-21s debut in November 2024, during a 6–1 win against Middlesbrough Under-21s in the Premier League 2. He also appeared for Tottenham's under-21s in a 5–1 loss to Ajax in the 2024–25 Premier League International Cup, and in a 3–0 defeat to Sutton United in the 2024–25 National League Cup.

On 1 April 2025, he signed his first professional contract with Tottenham Hotspur. In the 2025–26 UEFA Youth League, he made seven appearances as Tottenham were knocked out by Real Betis in the round of 32. On 5 August 2026, Tottenham Hotspur announced that Adewole had signed a new contract with the club.

On 13 October 2026, Adewole scored his first goal for Tottenham's under-21s, in a penalty shoot-out defeat to Cheltenham Town in the 2026–27 EFL Trophy.

== International career ==
Adewole has played for the Germany under-16 national team. He is eligible to represent four countries at international level, being Germany through birth, Nigeria and Austria through his father, and England because he has lived in England for over a decade.

== Personal life ==
Adewole's father is a citizen of both Nigeria and Austria.
