= Ibrahim Rabbaj =

Moroccan footballer (born 2009)

Personal information
- Full name: Ibrahim Rabbaj
- Date of birth: 3 January 2009 (age 17)
- Place of birth: Leicester, England
- Height: 1.65 m (5 ft 5 in)
- Position: Attacking midfielder

Team information
- Current team: Chelsea

Youth career
- Crystal Palace
- 2021–: Chelsea

International career^{‡}
| Years | Team | Apps | (Gls) |
| 2023 | Morocco U15 | 1 | (0) |
| 2024 | England U15 | 5 | (1) |
| 2024 | England U16 | 3 | (0) |
| 2025– | Morocco U17 | 17 | (0) |
Medal record
Men's football
Representing Morocco
U-17 Africa Cup of Nations
| Winner | Morocco 2025 |
- ‡ National team caps and goals as of 29 September 2026

Ibrahim Rabbaj (Arabic: إبراهيم الرباج; born 3 January 2009) is a professional footballer who plays as an attacking midfielder for Premier League club Chelsea. Born in England, he represents Morocco at youth level.

He has represented both Morocco and England at underage level.

== Club career ==
Rabbaj started playing football at Crystal Palace until the age of 11. In 2021, Chelsea Academy signed him. With his technical profile, Rabbaj was compared to former Barcelona footballer Lionel Messi.

On 20 January 2026, Rabbaj signed his first professional contract with Chelsea.

== International career ==
Born in England, Rabbaj is of Moroccan descent. He played for England U15 and U16 teams and for Morocco U15 and U17 teams. In March 2025, he was named in Morocco's squad for the 2025 U-17 Africa Cup of Nations. Morocco won the tournament.

== Honours ==
Chelsea U18

- U18 Premier League – National Champions: 2025–26
- U18 Premier League – Southern Champions: 2025–26

Morocco U17

- U-17 Africa Cup of Nations: 2025
- UNAF U-17 Tournament: 2026

Individual

- UNAF U-17 Tournament Player of the Tournament: 2026
