= Chelsea F.C. Academy =

Football development team in England

Chelsea Academy
- Nicknames: The Blues; The Young Blues
- Ground: Kingsmeadow; Cobham Training Centre
- Capacity: 4,850 (Kingsmeadow)
- Owner: BlueCo
- Manager: Harry Hudson (CNG); Dan Hogan (U18)
- League: Premier League 2 (CNG); U18 Premier League (U18)
- Website: www.chelseafc.com
Home colours	Away colours	Third colours

The Chelsea F.C. Academy is the academy of Chelsea Football Club, responsible for developing youth players from the under-9s age group and up. Since 2016, the academy has had Category One status following an independent audit conducted by the Premier League.

The most senior academy team is called Cobham Next Gen (CNG), previously named the Development Squad and Chelsea F.C. Under-21s. They play in the Premier League 2, the top level of reserve football in England, and were champions in the 2013–14 and 2019–20 seasons. The Cobham Next Gen team consists of under-19 and under-21 squads, although senior players occasionally feature, when recovering from injuries or otherwise not in the first team. As of 2026, the team is managed by Harry Hudson.

Chelsea F.C. U18s is the under-18 team of Chelsea Football Club, competing in the U18 Premier League. They have won the FA Youth Cup nine times, including five consecutive titles between 2014 and 2018. The academy has produced many successful players such as the brothers Ron and Allan Harris, Peter Bonetti, Bobby Tambling, Barry Bridges, Bert Murray, John Hollins, Peter Osgood, Ray Wilkins, Graeme Le Saux, Bobby Smith, Terry Venables, Jimmy Greaves, John Terry, Mason Mount, Reece James, Trevoh Chalobah, Levi Colwill and Conor Gallagher. Chelsea are the only English club to reach the final of the UEFA Youth League, winning it twice in four final appearances. As of 2026, the team is managed by Dan Hogan.

The Cobham Next Gen team play their home games at Kingsmeadow, while the under-18s play at the club's Cobham Training Centre in Cobham, Surrey. Both teams occasionally use the club's home ground Stamford Bridge for important matches.

== Current squads ==
=== Cobham Next Gen squad ===
As of 24 October 2026

Note: Flags indicate national team as defined under FIFA eligibility rules; some limited exceptions apply. Players may hold more than one non-FIFA nationality.

No.	Pos.	Nation	Player
46	MF	ECU	Kendry Páez
47	MF	SCO	Harrison McMahon
48	DF	IRL	Justin Osagie
50	GK	ENG	Freddy Bernal
51	MF	ENG	Leo Black
52	FW	ENG	Harrison Bettoni
55	MF	ENG	Sol Gordon
56	DF	SCO	Alfie Osborne
58	DF	ENG	Calvin Diakite
61	MF	ENG	Mathis Eboué

No.	Pos.	Nation	Player
62	FW	ENG	Chizaram Ezenwata
67	MF	ENG	Lewi Richards
69	DF	ENG	Dante Waite
85	DF	ENG	Kian Best
—	GK	ENG	Jack Austin
—	DF	ENG	Yisa Alao
—	DF	BRA	Denner
—	MF	POR	Leo Cardoso
—	MF	ENG	Charlie Holland
—	FW	ENG	Kobe Barbour

=== U18s squad ===
As of 7 November 2026

Note: Flags indicate national team as defined under FIFA eligibility rules; some limited exceptions apply. Players may hold more than one non-FIFA nationality.

No.	Pos.	Nation	Player
60	GK	ENG	Toby Bell
63	FW	ENG	Jashayde Greenwood
66	MF	MAR	Ibrahim Rabbaj
70	GK	ENG	Isaac Collinson
74	MF	ENG	Heze Grimwade
76	MF	POR	Isaac Badu Da Silva
77	FW	ENG	Andrew Pennie
78	DF	POL	Gabriel Sambou

No.	Pos.	Nation	Player
—	GK	ENG	Jake Murray
—	DF	ENG	Emmanuel Ayinde
—	DF	ENG	Riley Ebho
—	DF	USA	Jacob Hall
—	DF	BRA	Isago Silva
—	MF	ENG	Jack Anderson
—	MF	ENG	Jayden Malundama
—	FW	ENG	Kwamina Ampah

== Academy graduates since 2000s ==
- **Bold** indicates players who still play for Chelsea, including those who are currently out on loan to other clubs.

Player	International caps	Debut	Manager
(England) Leon Knight	England U20	v (Bulgaria) Levski Sofia, UEFA Cup, 27 September 2001	(Italy) Claudio Ranieri
(England) Joel Kitamirike		v (Israel) Hapoel Tel Aviv, UEFA Cup, 18 October 2001	(Italy) Claudio Ranieri
(England) Joe Keenan		v Aston Villa, Premier League, 9 February 2002	(Italy) Claudio Ranieri
(England) Carlton Cole	England	v Everton, Premier League, 6 April 2002	(Italy) Claudio Ranieri
(Germany) Robert Huth	Germany	v Aston Villa, Premier League, 11 May 2002	(Italy) Claudio Ranieri
(Portugal) Filipe Oliveira	Portugal U21	v (Norway) Viking, UEFA Cup, 19 September 2002	(Italy) Claudio Ranieri
(Cyprus) Alexis Nicolas	Cyprus U21	v Scarborough, FA Cup, 24 January 2004	(Italy) Claudio Ranieri
(Scotland) Steven Watt	Scotland U21	v Scunthorpe United, FA Cup, 8 January 2005	(Portugal) José Mourinho
(England) Lenny Pidgeley	England U20	v Charlton Athletic, Premier League, 7 May 2005	(Portugal) José Mourinho
(England) Anthony Grant	Jamaica	v Manchester United, Premier League, 10 May 2005	(Portugal) José Mourinho
(England) Jimmy Smith	England U19	v Newcastle United, Premier League, 7 May 2006	(Portugal) José Mourinho
(Israel) Ben Sahar	Israel	v Macclesfield Town, FA Cup, 6 January 2007	(Portugal) José Mourinho
(England) Michael Woods	England U19	v Macclesfield Town, FA Cup, 6 January 2007	(Portugal) José Mourinho
(England) Sam Hutchinson	England U19	v Everton, Premier League, 13 May 2007	(Portugal) José Mourinho
(England) Michael Mancienne	Seychelles	v Watford, FA Cup, 14 February 2009	(Netherlands) Guus Hiddink
(Italy) Fabio Borini	Italy	v Tottenham Hotspur, Premier League, 20 September 2009	(Italy) Carlo Ancelotti
(Netherlands) Jeffrey Bruma	Netherlands	v Blackburn Rovers, Premier League, 24 October 2009	(Italy) Carlo Ancelotti
(France) Gaël Kakuta	(Democratic Republic of the Congo) DR Congo	v Wolverhampton Wanderers, Premier League, 21 November 2009	(Italy) Carlo Ancelotti
(Netherlands) Patrick van Aanholt	Netherlands	v Portsmouth, Premier League, 24 March 2010	(Italy) Carlo Ancelotti
(England) Josh McEachran	England U21	v (Slovakia) MŠK Žilina, UEFA Champions League, 15 September 2010	(Italy) Carlo Ancelotti
(England) Jacob Mellis	England U19	v (Slovakia) MŠK Žilina, UEFA Champions League, 23 November 2010	(Italy) Carlo Ancelotti
(England) Ryan Bertrand	England	v Birmingham City, Premier League, 20 April 2011	(Italy) Carlo Ancelotti
(Brazil) Lucas Piazon	Brazil U23	v Wolverhampton Wanderers, 25 September 2012	(Italy) Roberto Di Matteo
(Netherlands) Nathan Aké	Netherlands	v Norwich City, Premier League, 26 December 2012	(Spain) Rafael Benítez
(England) Lewis Baker	England U21	v Derby County, FA Cup, 5 January 2014	(Portugal) José Mourinho
(England) John Swift	England U21	v (Wales) Cardiff City, Premier League, 11 May 2014	(Portugal) José Mourinho
(England) Dominic Solanke	England	v (Slovenia) Maribor, UEFA Champions League, 21 October 2014	(Portugal) José Mourinho
(Denmark) Andreas Christensen	Denmark	v Shrewsbury Town, EFL Cup, 28 October 2014	(Portugal) José Mourinho
(England) Ruben Loftus-Cheek	England	v (Portugal) Sporting CP, UEFA Champions League, 10 December 2014	(Portugal) José Mourinho
(Burkina Faso) Bertrand Traoré	Burkina Faso	v (Israel) Maccabi Tel Aviv, UEFA Champions League, 16 September 2015	(Portugal) José Mourinho
(England) Jake Clarke-Salter	England U21	v Aston Villa, Premier League, 2 April 2016	(Netherlands) Guus Hiddink
(England) Tammy Abraham	England	v Liverpool, Premier League, 11 May 2016	(Netherlands) Guus Hiddink
(England) Fikayo Tomori	England	v Leicester City, Premier League, 15 May 2016	(Netherlands) Guus Hiddink
(England) Ola Aina	Nigeria	v Bristol Rovers, EFL Cup, 23 August 2016	(Italy) Antonio Conte
(England) Nathaniel Chalobah	England	v Leicester City, EFL Cup, 20 September 2016	(Italy) Antonio Conte
(Belgium) Charly Musonda	Belgium U21	v Arsenal, Community Shield, 6 August 2017	(Italy) Antonio Conte
(Ivory Coast) Jérémie Boga	Ivory Coast	v Burnley, Premier League, 12 August 2017	(Italy) Antonio Conte
(England) Dujon Sterling	England U20	v Nottingham Forest, EFL Cup, 20 September 2017	(Italy) Antonio Conte
(England) Callum Hudson-Odoi	England	v Newcastle United, FA Cup, 28 January 2018	(Italy) Antonio Conte
(United States) Kyle Scott	United States U20	v Hull City, FA Cup, 16 February 2018	(Italy) Antonio Conte
(England) Mason Mount	England	v Manchester United, Premier League, 11 August 2019	(England) Frank Lampard
(Scotland) Billy Gilmour	Scotland	v Sheffield United, Premier League, 31 August 2019	(England) Frank Lampard
(England) Tino Anjorin	England U20	v Grimsby Town, EFL Cup, 25 September 2019	(England) Frank Lampard
(England) Marc Guehi	England	v Grimsby Town, EFL Cup, 25 September 2019	(England) Frank Lampard
(England) **Reece James**	England	v Grimsby Town, EFL Cup, 25 September 2019	(England) Frank Lampard
(Netherlands) Ian Maatsen	Netherlands	v Grimsby Town, EFL Cup, 25 September 2019	(England) Frank Lampard
(England) Tariq Lamptey	Ghana	v Arsenal, Premier League, 29 December 2019	(England) Frank Lampard
(Albania) Armando Broja	Albania	v Everton, Premier League, 8 March 2020	(England) Frank Lampard
(England) Trevoh Chalobah	England	v (Spain) Villarreal, UEFA Super Cup, 11 August 2021	(Germany) Thomas Tuchel
(England) Xavier Simons	England U20	v Brentford, EFL Cup, 22 December 2021	(Germany) Thomas Tuchel
(England) Jude Soonsup-Bell	Thailand	v Brentford, EFL Cup, 22 December 2021	(Germany) Thomas Tuchel
(England) Harvey Vale	England U20	v Brentford, EFL Cup, 22 December 2021	(Germany) Thomas Tuchel
(England) Lewis Hall	England	v Chesterfield, FA Cup, 8 January 2022	(Germany) Thomas Tuchel
(England) Conor Gallagher	England	v Everton, Premier League, 6 August 2022	(Germany) Thomas Tuchel
(Jamaica) Omari Hutchinson	Jamaica	v Manchester City, Premier League, 5 January 2023	(England) Graham Potter
(England) Bashir Humphreys	England U21	v Manchester City, FA Cup, 8 January 2023	(England) Graham Potter
(England) **Levi Colwill**	England	v Liverpool, Premier League, 13 August 2023	(Argentina) Mauricio Pochettino
(England) Alex Matos	England U20	v Fulham, Premier League, 2 October 2023	(Argentina) Mauricio Pochettino
(England) Alfie Gilchrist		v Crystal Palace, Premier League, 27 December 2023	(Argentina) Mauricio Pochettino
(England) Michael Golding	England U19	v Preston North End, EFL Cup, 6 January 2024	(Argentina) Mauricio Pochettino
(England) Leo Castledine	England U19	v Middlesbrough, EFL Cup, 23 January 2024	(Argentina) Mauricio Pochettino
(Italy) Cesare Casadei	Italy U21	v Liverpool, Premier League, 31 January 2024	(Argentina) Mauricio Pochettino
(Finland) Jimi Tauriainen	Finland U21	v Leeds United, FA Cup, 28 February 2024	(Argentina) Mauricio Pochettino
(England) **Josh Acheampong**	England U21	v Tottenham Hotspur, Premier League, 2 May 2024	(Argentina) Mauricio Pochettino
(England) Tyrique George	England U21	v (Switzerland) Servette, UEFA Conference League, 29 August 2024	(Italy) Enzo Maresca
(England) Samuel Rak-Sakyi	England U18	v (Armenia) Noah, UEFA Conference League, 7 November 2024	(Italy) Enzo Maresca
(England) Ato Ampah	England U20	v (Kazakhstan) Astana, UEFA Conference League, 12 December 2024	(Italy) Enzo Maresca
(England) **Kiano Dyer**	England U20	v (Kazakhstan) Astana, UEFA Conference League, 12 December 2024	(Italy) Enzo Maresca
(England) **Shim Mheuka**	England U20	v (Kazakhstan) Astana, UEFA Conference League, 12 December 2024	(Italy) Enzo Maresca
(England) **Harrison Murray-Campbell**	England U20	v (Republic of Ireland) Shamrock Rovers, UEFA Conference League, 19 December 2024	(Italy) Enzo Maresca
(Sweden) **Genesis Antwi**	Sweden	v (Denmark) Copenhagen, UEFA Conference League, 13 March 2025	(Italy) Enzo Maresca
(England) **Reggie Walsh**	England U19	v (Sweden) Djurgårdens IF, UEFA Conference League, 1 May 2025	(Italy) Enzo Maresca
(England) **Jesse Derry**	England U20	v Hull City, FA Cup, 13 February 2026	(England) Liam Rosenior
(England) **Ryan Kavuma-McQueen**	England U18	v Port Vale, FA Cup, 4 April 2026	(England) Liam Rosenior
(England) **Reggie Watson**	England U17	v Leeds United, EFL Cup, 9 September 2026	(Spain) Xabi Alonso
(England) **Mahdi Nicoll-Jazuli**	England U17	v Brentford, Premier League, 18 September 2026	(Spain) Xabi Alonso

== Notable Academy graduates ==
- Players who have at least 10 first-team appearances for Chelsea or have represented a country at full international level, are categorised by the decade in which they were graduated from the academy.
- **bold** indicates players who still play for Chelsea, including those who are currently out on loan to other clubs.

=== Before World War II ===
- (England) David Calderhead Jr.
- (England) Ron Greenwood
- (England) George Pearson
- (Scotland) Tommy Law
- (Scotland) Bill Robertson

=== 1950s ===
- (England) Micky Block
- (England) Peter Bonetti
- (England) Peter Brabrook
- (England) Terry Bradbury
- (England) Barry Bridges
- (England) David Cliss
- (England) John Compton
- (England) Derek Gibbs
- (England) Jimmy Greaves
- (England) Mike Harrison
- (England) Tony Nicholas
- (England) Mel Scott
- (England) Ken Shellito
- (England) Bobby Smith
- (England) Bobby Tambling
- (Republic of Ireland) Dick Whittaker

=== 1960s ===
- (England) Dennis Brown
- (England) Dennis Butler
- (England) John Dunn
- (England) Allan Harris
- (England) Ron Harris
- (England) John Hollins
- (England) Peter Houseman
- (England) Alan Hudson
- (England) Barry Lloyd
- (England) Bert Murray
- (England) Peter Osgood
- (England) Terry Venables
- (Scotland) John Boyle
- (Scotland) Stewart Houston

=== 1970s ===
- (England) Trevor Aylott
- (England) Brian Bason
- (England) John Bumstead
- (England) Gary Chivers
- (England) Mike Fillery
- (England) Lee Frost
- (England) Kevin Hales
- (England) Gary Johnson
- (England) Tommy Langley
- (England) Ray Lewington
- (England) Gary Locke
- (England) Teddy Maybank
- (England) Micky Nutton
- (England) Colin Pates
- (England) Peter Rhoades-Brown
- (England) Steve Sherwood
- (England) John Sitton
- (England) John Sparrow
- (England) Gary Stanley
- (England) David Stride
- (England) Clive Walker
- (England) Steve Wicks
- (England) Graham Wilkins
- (England) Ray Wilkins
- (Scotland) Ian Britton
- (Scotland) Steve Finnieston

=== 1980s ===
- (England) Jason Cundy
- (England) Keith Dublin
- (England) Steve Francis
- (England) Robert Isaac
- (England) Dale Jasper
- (England) Keith Jones
- (England) David Lee
- (England) Graeme Le Saux
- (England) Damian Matthew
- (England) Graham Stuart
- (England) Colin West
- (Scotland) Craig Burley
- (Scotland) Billy Dodds
- (Scotland) John Millar
- (Wales) Gareth Hall

=== 1990s ===
- (England) Michael Duberry
- (England) Jon Harley
- (England) Paul Hughes
- (England) Jody Morris
- (England) Andy Myers
- (England) Eddie Newton
- (England) Mark Nicholls
- (England) Neil Shipperley
- (England) John Terry
- (Italy) Samuele Dalla Bona
- (Jamaica) Frank Sinclair

=== 2000s ===
- (Democratic Republic of the Congo) Gaël Kakuta
- (England) Ryan Bertrand
- (England) Carlton Cole
- (Germany) Robert Huth
- (Israel) Ben Sahar
- (Italy) Fabio Borini
- (Jamaica) Anthony Grant
- (Netherlands) Jeffrey Bruma
- (Netherlands) Patrick van Aanholt
- (Seychelles) Michael Mancienne

=== 2010s ===
- (Burkina Faso) Bertrand Traoré
- (Ivory Coast) Jérémie Boga
- (Denmark) Andreas Christensen
- (England) Tammy Abraham
- (England) Nathaniel Chalobah
- (England) Trevoh Chalobah
- (England) Conor Gallagher
- (England) Marc Guéhi
- (England) Callum Hudson-Odoi
- (England) **Reece James**
- (England) Ruben Loftus-Cheek
- (England) Josh McEachran
- (England) Mason Mount
- (England) Dominic Solanke
- (England) Fikayo Tomori
- (Ghana) Tariq Lamptey
- (Netherlands) Nathan Aké
- (Netherlands) Ian Maatsen
- (Nigeria) Ola Aina
- (Scotland) Billy Gilmour

=== 2020s ===
- (Sweden) **Genesis Antwi**
- (Albania) Armando Broja
- (England) **Josh Acheampong**
- (England) **Levi Colwill**
- (England) Tyrique George
- (England) Alfie Gilchrist
- (England) Lewis Hall
- (Jamaica) Omari Hutchinson
- (Italy) Cesare Casadei
- (Thailand) Jude Soonsup-Bell

== Honours ==
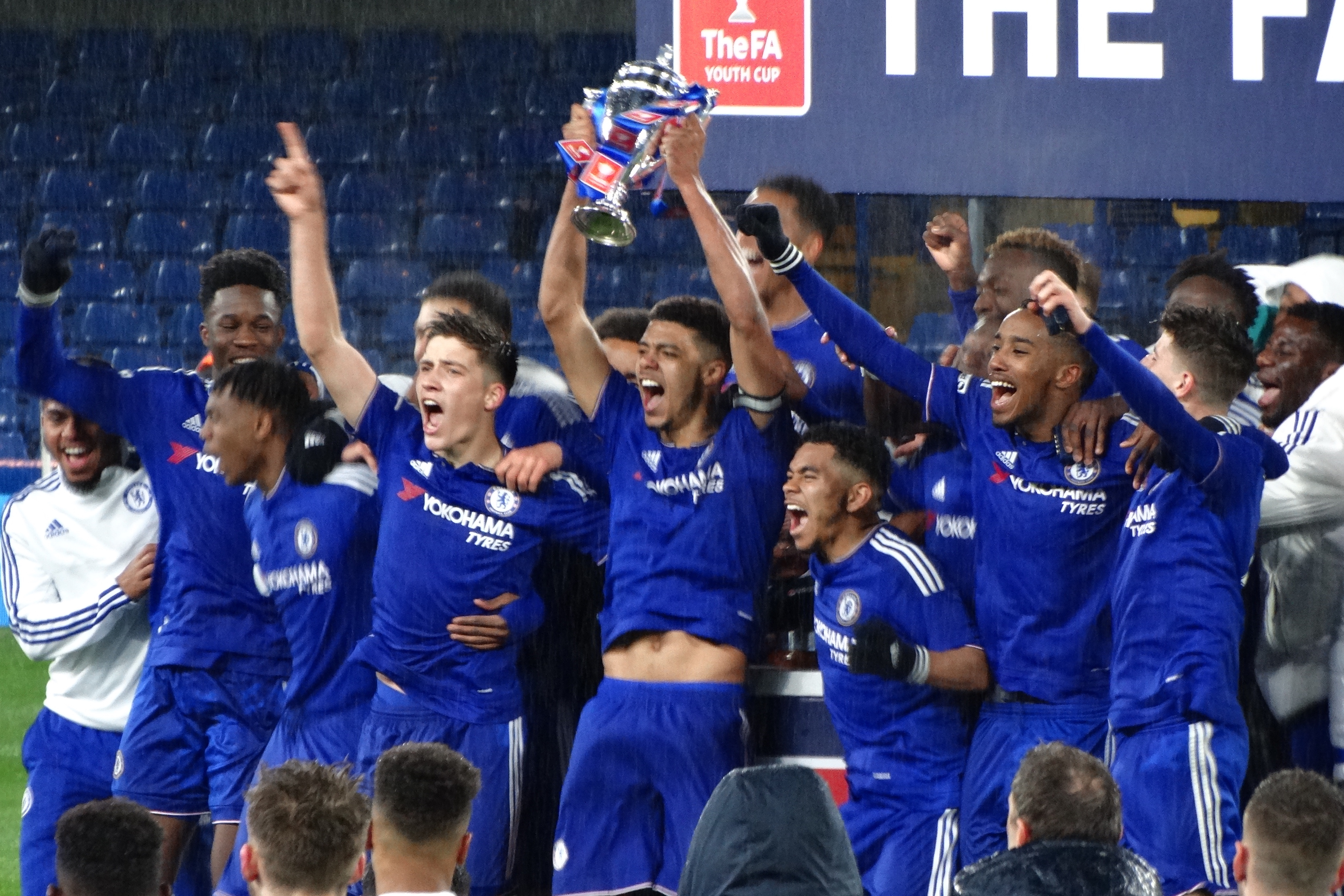
Chelsea players celebrating winning the 2015–16 FA Youth Cup.

=== Reserves team ===
- U21 Premier League / Premier League 2
  - Winners (2): 2013–14, 2019–20
- The Football Combination
  - Winners (11): 1948–49, 1954–55, 1957–58, 1959–60, 1960–61, 1964–65, 1974–75, 1976–77, 1984–85, 1990–91, 1993–94
- Premier Reserve League – National Champions
  - Winners (1): 2010–11
- Premier Reserve League – Southern Champions
  - Winners (1): 2010–11
- London Challenge Cup
  - Winners (5): 1919–20, 1926–27, 1949–50, 1959–60, 1960–61
- Metropolitan League
  - Winners (3): 1954–55, 1956–57, 1957–58

=== Academy team ===
- Blue Stars Youth Tournament
  - Winners (1): 1984
- UEFA Youth League
  - Winners (2): 2014–15, 2015–16
- U18 Premier League – National Champions
  - Winners (3): 2016–17, 2017–18, 2025–26
- U18 Premier League – Southern Champions
  - Winners (6): 2014–15, 2015–16, 2016–17, 2017–18, 2023–24, 2025–26
- FA Youth Cup
  - Winners (9): 1959–60, 1960–61, 2009–10, 2011–12, 2013–14, 2014–15, 2015–16, 2016–17, 2017–18
- U18 Premier League Cup
  - Winners (2): 2017–18, 2021–22
- U17 Premier League Cup
  - Winners (1): 2023–24
- U16 Premier League Cup
  - Winners (1): 2018–19
- Southern Junior Floodlight Cup
  - Winners (5): 1955–56, 1959–60, 1960–61, 1961–62, 1963–64
- South East Counties League
  - Winners (10): 1954–55, 1956–57, 1957–58, 1958–59, 1959–60, 1960–61, 1961–62, 1962–63, 1973–74, 1983–84
- South East Counties League Cup
  - Winners (11): 1952–53, 1953–54, 1956–57, 1957–58, 1958–59, 1962–63, 1964–65, 1972–73, 1973–74, 1983–84, 1986–87
- North Surrey Minor League
  - Winners (1): 1953–54
- London Minor Challenge Cup
  - Winners (3): 1949–50, 1951–52, 1953–54
