= England national under-18 football team =

National U-18 football team

England U-18
- Nickname: The Three Lions
- Association: The Football Association (The FA)
- Confederation: UEFA (Europe)
- Head coach: Will Antwi
- FIFA code: ENG
First colours	Second colours

First international
- Unknown

Biggest win
- Unknown

Biggest defeat
- Unknown

World Cup
- Appearances: Unknown
- Best result: Unknown

Unknown
- Appearances: Unknown (first in Unknown)
- Best result: Unknown

England national under-18 football team, also known as England under-18s or England U18(s), represents England in association football at under-18 age level and is controlled by the Football Association, the governing body for football in England.

The team competed in the FIFA International Youth Tournament (later taken over by UEFA) and its successor, the UEFA European Under-18 Championship, and was often referred to as England Youth. After the tournament was renamed the European Under-18 Championship, England won twice more, in 1980 and 1993. In 1997, eligibility rules changed and the competition was rebranded as the UEFA European Under-19 Championship in 2001.

Nowadays, the under-18 banner is used for participation in international friendlies. The 2017 Toulon Tournament was also composed largely of under-18 players.

== Players ==
=== Latest squad ===
For the 2026–27 season, players born on or after 1 January 2009 are eligible. Players born between January and August 2009 are second-year scholars in the English academy system, players born between September 2009 and August 2010 are first-year scholars.

The following players were named in the squad for games against Netherlands, Sweden and Switzerland, played between 11–16 November 2026.

Names in italics denote players who have been capped by England in a higher age group.

No.	Pos.	Player	Date of birth (age)	Club
	GK	Joseph Cowan	14 July 2009 (age 17)	(The Football Association) Sunderland
	GK	Roman Dowell	3 December 2009 (age 16)	(The Football Association) Newcastle United
	GK	Ben Vickery	6 August 2009 (age 17)	(The Football Association) Manchester City
	DF	Marlow Barrett	9 November 2009 (age 17)	(The Football Association) Manchester City
	DF	Calvin Diakite	7 April 2009 (age 17)	(The Football Association) Chelsea
	DF	Freddie Lawrie	17 March 2009 (age 17)	(The Football Association) Aston Villa
	DF	Marli Salmon	29 August 2009 (age 17)	(The Football Association) Arsenal
	DF	Gabriel Sambou	25 November 2009 (age 16)	(The Football Association) Chelsea
	DF	Oscar Sandiford	2 November 2009 (age 17)	(The Football Association) Tottenham Hotspur
	DF	Reon Smith	1 November 2009 (age 17)	(The Football Association) West Ham United
	DF	Jacob Watson	16 May 2009 (age 17)	(The Football Association) Manchester United
	MF	Jerome Abbey	16 September 2009 (age 17)	(The Football Association) Wolverhampton Wanderers
	MF	Samuel Alker	13 March 2009 (age 17)	(The Football Association) Leeds United
	MF	Hugo De Lisle	16 June 2009 (age 17)	(The Football Association) Leicester City
	MF	Erik Farkas	5 September 2009 (age 17)	(The Football Association) Liverpool
	MF	Max Little	1 September 2009 (age 17)	(The Football Association) Southampton
	MF	Tyrese Noubissie	13 May 2009 (age 17)	(French Football Federation) Strasbourg
	FW	Oliver Boast	7 May 2009 (age 17)	(The Football Association) Tottenham Hotspur
	FW	Mathis Eboué	27 February 2009 (age 17)	(The Football Association) Chelsea
	FW	Jashayde Greenwood	10 August 2009 (age 17)	(The Football Association) Chelsea
	FW	Ryan Kavuma-McQueen	1 January 2009 (age 17)	(The Football Association) Portsmouth (on loan from Chelsea)
	FW	Teddie Lamb	2 July 2009 (age 17)	(The Football Association) Manchester City
	FW	Jeremy Monga	10 July 2009 (age 17)	(Football Association of Wales) Swansea City (on loan from Manchester City)
	FW	Kyran Thompson	6 September 2009 (age 17)	(The Football Association) Newcastle United

=== Recent call-ups ===
The following players have previously been called up to the England under-18 squad and remain eligible.

Pos.	Player	Date of birth (age)	Caps	Goals	Club	Latest call-up
DF	Jacob Howard	29 March 2009 (age 17)	-	-	(England) Leeds United	UEFA Friendship Cup, September 2026 ^{INJ}
DF	Jake Wain	29 January 2009 (age 17)	-	-	(England) Manchester City	UEFA Friendship Cup, September 2026
DF	Oliver Wilkinson	24 January 2009 (age 17)	-	-	(England) Ipswich Town	UEFA Friendship Cup, September 2026
MF	Sam Alabi	9 July 2009 (age 17)	-	-	(England) Newcastle United	UEFA Friendship Cup, September 2026
FW	Joél Drakes-Thomas	9 June 2009 (age 17)	-	-	(England) Crystal Palace	UEFA Friendship Cup, September 2026 ^{INJ}
FW	Michael Mills	18 February 2009 (age 17)	-	-	(England) Newcastle United	UEFA Friendship Cup, September 2026
FW	Phoenix Offiah	24 September 2009 (age 17)	-	-	(England) Tottenham Hotspur	UEFA Friendship Cup, September 2026
FW	Kahlil Steele	14 January 2009 (age 17)	-	-	(England) Norwich City	UEFA Friendship Cup, September 2026 ^{INJ}
FW	Ajay Tavares	28 December 2009 (age 16)	-	-	(Spain) Barcelona	UEFA Friendship Cup, September 2026

^{INJ} Player withdrew from the squad before any games had been played.

== Honours ==
- FIFA International Youth Tournament
  - Winners: 1948
- UEFA International Youth Tournament
  - Winners: 1963, 1964, 1971, 1972, 1973, 1975
  - Runners-up: 1958, 1965, 1967
- UEFA European Under-18 Championship
  - Winners: 1980, 1993
