= Josh Sonni-Lambie =

English footballer (born 2007)

Personal information
- Full name: Joshua Junior Sonni-Lambie
- Date of birth: 16 November 2007 (age 18)
- Place of birth: England
- Height: 1.79 m (5 ft 10 in)
- Position: Striker

Team information
- Current team: Liverpool
- Number: 82

Youth career
- Liverpool

International career^{‡}
Years	Team	Apps	(Gls)
2025–	England U18	5	(2)
- ‡ National team caps and goals as of 28 May 2025

Joshua Junior Sonni-Lambie (born 16 November 2007) is an English professional footballer who plays as a striker for Liverpool.

== Club career ==
As a youth player, Sonni-Lambie joined the youth academy of Premier League side Liverpool, where he played in the UEFA Youth League.

== International career ==
Sonni-Lambie is an England youth international. On 20 March 2025, he debuted for the England national under-18 football team during a 2–2 friendly draw with the Czech Republic national under-18 football team.

== Style of play ==
Sonni-Lambie plays as a striker. American newspaper The New York Times wrote in 2025 that "[the] street football style is still evident in his ability and desire to take on defenders with a trick or two".
