= Mathis Eboué =

English footballer (born 2009)

Personal information
- Date of birth: 27 February 2009 (age 17)
- Place of birth: Watford, England
- Height: 1.78 m (5 ft 10 in)
- Positions: Midfielder; winger

Team information
- Current team: Chelsea

Youth career
- Top Ballerz FC
- Watford
- 2025–: Chelsea

International career^{‡}
Years	Team	Apps	(Gls)
2024	England U16	3	(1)
2025–	England U17	6	(4)
- ‡ National team caps and goals as of 18 November 2025

Mathis Eboué (born 27 February 2009) is an English professional footballer who plays as a midfielder or winger for Chelsea.

== Early life ==
Eboué was born on 27 February 2009. Born in Watford, England, he is the son of Ivory Coast international Emmanuel Eboué and a Belgian mother. Eboué developed his skills at Top Ballerz FC before being spotted by Watford at the age of 13.

== Club career ==
As a youth player, Eboué joined the youth academy of Watford. He joined Chelsea academy in 2025.

== International career ==
Eboué is an England youth international. On 3 September 2025, he debuted for the England national under-17 football team during a 2–1 away friendly win over the Venezuela national under-17 football team.

== Style of play ==
Eboué plays as a midfielder or winger. Belgian newspaper La Dernière Heure wrote in 2025 that he is "an excellent dribbler".

== Honours ==
Chelsea U18

- U18 Premier League – National Champions: 2025–26
- U18 Premier League – Southern Champions: 2025–26
