= Mohamed Keita (footballer) =

Guinean footballer

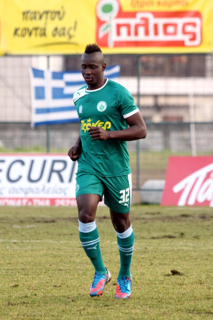

Personal information
- Full name: Mohamed Keita
- Date of birth: June 9, 1991 (age 35)
- Place of birth: Conakry, Guinea
- Height: 1.85 m (6 ft 1 in)
- Position: Midfield-Central Midfield

Youth career
- Horoya AC -: AEK Athens

Senior career*
Years	Team	Apps	(Gls)
2010-2011	Doxa Drama	22	(4)
2011	Klaipėda	33	(5)
2011-2012	Thrasyvoulos	24	(6)

International career
Guinea (A)-tow Games -	Guinea - U23 -17 Games - 9 Goals -	Guinea - U20 -22 Games - 8 Goals	
- * Club domestic league appearances and goals

Mohamed Keita (born June 9, 1991,Conakry,Guinea), is an international Guinean football player. He played for the Guinea national team under-U20-U23.Mohamed Keita has also been tow Games with Guinea national team (A).

== Career ==
Keita started his career at age 16 in the club Horoya AC (Guinea).After two years, he signed with AEK Athens in Greece. Later, he went to Doxa Drama F.C. in the 2nd Division loan from AEK athens. In 2011 he joined FC Klaipeda in Lithuania. He came back to Greece and signed for Thrasyvoulos F.C. Keita has played for Guinea's under-U20-U23 national team. Mohamed Keita was also with Guinea national team (A) tow Games.
