= Teddie Lamb =

English footballer (born 2008)

Personal information
- Date of birth: 2 July 2009 (age 17)
- Place of birth: London, England
- Position: Forward

Team information
- Current team: Manchester City

Youth career
- –2025: Leyton Orient
- 2025–: Manchester City

International career^{‡}
Years	Team	Apps	(Gls)
2025–	England U17	5	(1)
- ‡ National team caps and goals as of 31 March 2026

Teddie Lamb (born 2 July 2009) is an English professional footballer who plays as a forward for Manchester City.

== Club career ==
As a youth player, Lamb joined the youth academy of Leyton Orient. Following his stint there, he joined the youth academy of Premier League side Manchester City ahead of the 2025–26 season, where he was the top scorer of the 2025–26 Professional U18 Development League with twenty-five goals.

== International career ==
Lamb is an England youth international. During the spring of 2026, he played for the England national under-17 football team for 2026 UEFA European Under-17 Championship qualification.

== Style of play ==
Lamb plays as a forward. English newspaper Manchester Evening News wrote in 2026 that "while his goals grab the headlines, his all-round ability to hold up the ball and link play is also catching the eye".
