= FA Youth Cup Finals of the 2010s =

List of English football matches

FA Youth Cup Finals between 2010 and 2019.

== 2009–10: Chelsea vs Aston Villa (1–1 and 2–1, 3–2 aggregate) ==
=== First leg ===
29 April 2010
20:00 BST

Aston Villa	1–1	Chelsea
Devine 19'	Report	Bruma 64'

Villa Park, Birmingham
Attendance: 3,359
Referee: Kevin Friend

Note: Flags indicate national team as defined under FIFA eligibility rules; some limited exceptions apply. Players may hold more than one non-FIFA nationality.

Aston Villa
No.	Pos.	Nation	Player
1	GK	SUI	Benjamin Siegrist
2	DF	ENG	Durrell Berry
3	DF	ENG	Ellis Deeney (c)
4	DF	IRL	Daniel Devine
5	DF	IRL	Derrick Williams
6	MF	ENG	Richard Blythe
7	MF	IRL	Samir Carruthers
8	MF	ENG	Ebby Nelson-Addy
9	FW	ENG	Kofi Poyser (substituted off) 79'
10	FW	ENG	Ryan Simmonds (substituted off) 83'
11	MF	WAL	Tomos Roberts
Sub	DF	NED	Arsenio Halfhuid (substituted on) 83'
Sub	GK	SCO	Calum Barrett
Sub	DF	ENG	James Clifton
Sub	MF	JAM	Daniel Johnson
Sub	FW	ENG	Darius Darkin (substituted on) 79'

Chelsea
No.	Pos.	Nation	Player
1	GK	ENG	Sam Walker
2	DF	ENG	Billy Clifford
3	DF	MSR	Rohan Ince
4	DF	NED	Jeffrey Bruma
5	DF	SLE	Aziz Deen-Conteh (substituted off) 90'
6	MF	IRL	Conor Clifford (c) (substituted off) 72'
7	MF	ITA	Jacopo Sala
8	MF	GBS	Aliu Djaló
9	FW	SWE	Marko Mitrović
10	MF	ENG	Josh McEachran
11	MF	TUR	Gökhan Töre
Sub	FW	SVK	Milan Lalkovič (substituted on) 72'
Sub	GK	ALB	Aldi Haxhia
Sub	MF	NIR	George Saville
Sub	DF	ENG	Ben Sampayo (substituted on) 90'
Sub	MF	IRL	Anton Rodgers

=== Second leg ===
4 May 2010
19:45 BST

Chelsea	2–1	Aston Villa
Mitrović 64'; C. Clifford 83'		Poyser 32'

Stamford Bridge, London
Attendance: 10,446
Referee: Kevin Friend

Note: Flags indicate national team as defined under FIFA eligibility rules; some limited exceptions apply. Players may hold more than one non-FIFA nationality.

Chelsea
No.	Pos.	Nation	Player
1	GK	ENG	Sam Walker
2	DF	ENG	Billy Clifford
3	DF	MSR	Rohan Ince
4	DF	NED	Jeffrey Bruma
5	DF	SLE	Aziz Deen-Conteh
6	MF	IRL	Conor Clifford (c)
7	MF	ITA	Jacopo Sala
8	MF	GBS	Aliu Djaló (substituted off) 90'
9	FW	SWE	Marko Mitrović
10	MF	ENG	Josh McEachran
11	MF	TUR	Gökhan Töre (substituted off) 88'
Sub	FW	SVK	Milan Lalkovič (substituted on) 88'
Sub	GK	ALB	Aldi Haxhia
Sub	MF	NIR	George Saville
Sub	DF	ENG	Ben Sampayo (substituted on) 90'
Sub	MF	IRL	Anton Rodgers

Aston Villa
No.	Pos.	Nation	Player
1	GK	SUI	Benjamin Siegrist
2	DF	ENG	Durrell Berry
3	DF	ENG	Ellis Deeney (c)
4	DF	IRL	Daniel Devine
5	DF	IRL	Derrick Williams (substituted off) 71'
6	MF	ENG	Richard Blythe (substituted off) 89'
7	MF	IRL	Samir Carruthers
8	MF	ENG	Ebby Nelson-Addy
9	FW	ENG	Kofi Poyser
10	FW	ENG	Ryan Simmonds
11	MF	WAL	Tomos Roberts
Sub	MF	JAM	Daniel Johnson
Sub	GK	SCO	Calum Barrett
Sub	DF	NED	Arsenio Halfhuid (substituted on) 89'
Sub	FW	ENG	Darius Darkin (substituted on) 71'
Sub	DF	ENG	Jack Dyer

== 2010–11: Manchester United vs Sheffield United (2–2 and 4–1, 6–3 aggregate) ==
=== First leg ===
17 May 2011
20:00 BST

Sheffield United	2–2	Manchester United
McFadzean 45'; Slew 72'		Lingard 14'; W. Keane 70'

Bramall Lane, Sheffield
Attendance: 29,977
Referee: Michael Oliver

Note: Flags indicate national team as defined under FIFA eligibility rules; some limited exceptions apply. Players may hold more than one non-FIFA nationality.

Sheffield United
No.	Pos.	Nation	Player
1	GK	ENG	George Long
2	DF	ENG	Ben Montgomery
3	DF	ENG	Harry Maguire (substituted off) 86'
4	DF	ENG	Terry Kennedy
5	DF	IRL	Aaron Barry
6	MF	ENG	Corey Gregory (substituted off) 72'
7	MF	IRL	Matthew Harriott
8	MF	ENG	Elliott Whitehouse (c)
9	MF	SCO	Callum McFadzean
10	MF	ENG	Joe Ironside (substituted off) 74'
11	FW	ENG	Jordan Slew
Sub	DF	ESP	Carlos Pomares (substituted on) 86'
Sub	MF	IRI	Porya Ahmadi
Sub	FW	ENG	Connor Martin (substituted on) 74'
Sub	MF	ENG	Liam Wilkinson (substituted on) 72'
Sub	GK	ENG	George Willis
Sub	FW	WAL	Tomos Davies

Manchester United
No.	Pos.	Nation	Player
1	GK	ENG	Sam Johnstone
2	DF	ENG	Michael Keane
3	DF	IRL	Sean McGinty
4	DF	ENG	Tom Thorpe (c)
5	DF	ITA	Michele Fornasier
6	MF	ENG	Ryan Tunnicliffe
7	MF	ENG	Jesse Lingard
8	MF	FRA	Paul Pogba
9	FW	IRL	Will Keane
10	FW	JAM	Ravel Morrison
11	MF	NED	Gyliano van Velzen (substituted off) 76'
Sub	FW	ENG	John Cofie (substituted on) 76'
Sub	DF	ITA	Alberto Massacci
Sub	GK	IRL	Joe Coll
Sub	DF	ENG	Zeki Fryers
Sub	MF	WAL	Tom Lawrence

=== Second leg ===
23 May 2011
19:30 BST

Manchester United	4–1	Sheffield United
Morrison 38', 70'; W. Keane 45', 80'		Ironside 72'

Old Trafford, Manchester
Attendance: 24,916
Referee: Michael Oliver

Note: Flags indicate national team as defined under FIFA eligibility rules; some limited exceptions apply. Players may hold more than one non-FIFA nationality.

Manchester United
No.	Pos.	Nation	Player
1	GK	ENG	Sam Johnstone
2	DF	ENG	Michael Keane
3	DF	IRL	Sean McGinty
4	DF	ENG	Tom Thorpe (c)
5	DF	ITA	Michele Fornasier
6	MF	ENG	Ryan Tunnicliffe
7	MF	ENG	Jesse Lingard (substituted off) 78'
8	MF	FRA	Paul Pogba
9	FW	IRL	Will Keane
10	FW	ENG	Ravel Morrison (substituted off) 91'
11	MF	NED	Gyliano van Velzen (substituted off) 84'
Sub	FW	ENG	John Cofie (substituted on) 91'
Sub	DF	ITA	Alberto Massacci
Sub	GK	ENG	Joe Coll
Sub	DF	ENG	Tyler Blackett (substituted on) 84'
Sub	MF	ENG	Larnell Cole (substituted on) 78'

Sheffield United
No.	Pos.	Nation	Player
1	GK	ENG	George Long
2	DF	ENG	Ben Montgomery
3	DF	ENG	Harry Maguire (substituted off) 57'
4	DF	ENG	Terry Kennedy
5	DF	IRL	Aaron Barry
6	MF	ENG	Corey Gregory (substituted off) 68'
7	MF	IRL	Matthew Harriott
8	MF	ENG	Elliott Whitehouse (c)
9	MF	SCO	Callum McFadzean
10	MF	ENG	Joe Ironside (substituted off) 76'
11	FW	ENG	Jordan Slew
Sub	DF	ESP	Carlos Pomares (substituted on) 57'
Sub	MF	IRI	Porya Ahmadi
Sub	MF	ENG	Connor Martin (substituted on) 68'
Sub	FW	ENG	Liam Wilkinson (substituted on) 76'
Sub	GK	ENG	George Willis

== 2011–12: Chelsea vs Blackburn Rovers (4–0 and 0–1, 4–1 aggregate) ==
=== First leg ===
20 April 2012
19:00 BST

Chelsea	4–0	Blackburn Rovers
Chalobah 20'; Baker 28'; Feruz 60', 69'	The FA.com

Stamford Bridge, London
Attendance: 3,412
Referee: Lee Probert

Note: Flags indicate national team as defined under FIFA eligibility rules; some limited exceptions apply. Players may hold more than one non-FIFA nationality.

Chelsea
No.	Pos.	Nation	Player
1	GK	ENG	Jamal Blackman
2	DF	ENG	Todd Kane
3	DF	SCO	Alex Davey
4	DF	NED	Nathan Aké
5	DF	TAN	Adam Nditi
6	MF	ENG	Nathaniel Chalobah (c)
7	MF	SWE	Amin Affane (substituted off) 53'
8	MF	ENG	John Swift
9	MF	SCO	Islam Feruz (substituted off) 78'
10	MF	ENG	Lewis Baker
11	FW	BRA	Lucas Piazon
Sub	FW	ENG	Alex Kiwomya (substituted on) 53'
Sub	GK	ENG	Mitchell Beeney
Sub	DF	ENG	Alistair Gordon
Sub	MF	ENG	Reece Mitchell (substituted on) 78'
Sub	DF	ENG	Archange Nkumu

Blackburn Rovers
No.	Pos.	Nation	Player
1	GK	ENG	Matthew Urwin
2	DF	ENG	Peter Wylie (substituted off) 61'
3	DF	ENG	Will Beesley
4	MF	ENG	Reece Hands (substituted off) 61'
5	DF	ENG	Ryan Edwards (c)
6	DF	ENG	Jack O'Connell
7	FW	NGR	Osayamen Osawe
8	DF	SKN	Raheem Hanley
9	FW	ENG	Curtis Haley (substituted off) 82'
10	MF	IRL	John O'Sullivan
11	MF	ESP	Hugo Fernandez
Sub	MF	IRL	Darragh Lenihan (substituted on) 61'
Sub	GK	GLP	Christopher Dilo
Sub	FW	NZL	Tim Payne (substituted on) 82'
Sub	DF	ENG	Kellen Daly
Sub	MF	ENG	Robbie Cotton (substituted on) 61'

=== Second leg ===
9 May 2012
19:00 BST

Blackburn Rovers	1–0	Chelsea
Payne 25'	The FA.com

Ewood Park, Blackburn
Attendance: 1,490

Note: Flags indicate national team as defined under FIFA eligibility rules; some limited exceptions apply. Players may hold more than one non-FIFA nationality.

Blackburn Rovers
No.	Pos.	Nation	Player
1	GK	ENG	Matthew Urwin
2	DF	ENG	Kellen Daly
3	DF	ENG	Ryan Edwards (c)
4	DF	ENG	Jack O’Connell
5	DF	ENG	Peter Wylie
6	DF	ENG	Bradley Mason (substituted off) 82'
7	MF	ENG	Robbie Cotton (substituted off) 61'
8	DF	SKN	Raheem Hanley
9	MF	ESP	Hugo Fernandez
10	FW	NZL	Tim Payne (substituted off) 70'
11	MF	IRL	John O'Sullivan
Sub	GK	GLP	Christopher Dilo
Sub	MF	ENG	Danny Laverty (substituted on) 82'
Sub	MF	ENG	Antonie Boland (substituted on) 61'
Sub	FW	ENG	Curtis Haley (substituted on) 70'
Sub	DF	ENG	Will Beesley

Chelsea
No.	Pos.	Nation	Player
1	GK	ENG	Jamal Blackman
2	DF	ENG	Todd Kane
3	DF	SCO	Alex Davey
4	DF	ENG	Archange Nkumu (substituted off) 59'
5	DF	ENG	Alastair Gordon (substituted off) 46'
6	MF	ENG	John Swift
7	MF	ENG	Nathaniel Chalobah (c)
8	MF	ENG	Lewis Baker
9	MF	SWE	Amin Affane (substituted off) 23'
10	MF	SCO	Islam Feruz
11	FW	BRA	Lucas Piazon
Sub	GK	ENG	Mitchell Beeney
Sub	MF	ENG	Ruben Loftus-Cheek (substituted on) 59'
Sub	DF	TAN	Adam Nditi (substituted on) 46'
Sub	FW	ENG	Alex Kiwomya (substituted on) 23'
Sub	DF	ENG	Nortei Nortey

== 2012–13: Norwich City vs Chelsea (1–0 and 3–2, 4–2 aggregate) ==
=== First leg ===
29 April 2013
19:45 BST

Norwich City	1–0	Chelsea
McGeehan 90+'	The FA.com

Carrow Road, Norwich
Attendance: 21,595
Referee: Neil Swarbrick

Note: Flags indicate national team as defined under FIFA eligibility rules; some limited exceptions apply. Players may hold more than one non-FIFA nationality.

Norwich City
No.	Pos.	Nation	Player
1	GK	ENG	William Britt
2	DF	ENG	Cameron Norman
3	DF	ENG	Ben Wyatt
4	MF	NIR	Cameron McGeehan (c)
5	DF	IRL	Kyle Callan-McFadden
6	DF	ENG	Harry Toffolo
7	MF	ENG	Jacob Murphy
8	MF	ENG	Harry Randall
9	FW	ENG	Carlton Morris
10	MF	SCO	Cameron King (substituted off) 75'
11	MF	ENG	Josh Murphy
Sub	DF	ENG	Kevin Lokko
Sub	GK	ENG	Tyler Reading
Sub	MF	ENG	Harvey Hodd
Sub	MF	ENG	Rod Young (substituted on) 75'
Sub	FW	ANT	Rhys Browne

Chelsea
No.	Pos.	Nation	Player
1	GK	ENG	Mitchell Beeney
2	DF	NGR	Ola Aina
3	DF	SCO	Alex Davey
4	DF	NED	Nathan Aké
5	DF	SLE	Kevin Wright
6	MF	ENG	Lewis Baker (c)
7	MF	ENG	Charlie Colkett (substituted off) 60'
8	DF	ENG	Ruben Loftus-Cheek
9	FW	SCO	Islam Feruz (substituted off) 73'
10	MF	CIV	Jérémie Boga
11	FW	ENG	Alex Kiwomya
Sub	DF	ENG	Dion Conroy
Sub	GK	ENG	Ben Killip
Sub	MF	ENG	John Swift (substituted on) 60'
Sub	DF	ENG	Fankaty Dabo
Sub	MF	BEL	Charly Musonda (substituted on) 73'

=== Second leg ===
13 May 2013
19:45 BST

Chelsea	2–3	Norwich City
Boga 15', 87'	The FA.com	Nditi 21' (o.g.); McGeehan 36'; Jo. Murphy 76'

Stamford Bridge, London
Attendance: 17,676
Referee: Neil Swarbrick

Note: Flags indicate national team as defined under FIFA eligibility rules; some limited exceptions apply. Players may hold more than one non-FIFA nationality.

Chelsea
No.	Pos.	Nation	Player
1	GK	ENG	Mitchell Beeney
2	DF	NGR	Ola Aina (substituted off) 72'
3	DF	SCO	Alex Davey
4	DF	DEN	Andreas Christensen
5	DF	TAN	Adam Nditi (substituted off) 70'
6	MF	ENG	Lewis Baker (c)
7	MF	ENG	John Swift (substituted off) 63'
8	DF	ENG	Ruben Loftus-Cheek
9	FW	SCO	Islam Feruz
10	MF	CIV	Jérémie Boga
11	FW	ENG	Alex Kiwomya
Sub	DF	ENG	Dion Conroy
Sub	GK	ENG	Ben Killip
Sub	MF	ENG	Charlie Colkett (substituted on) 63'
Sub	DF	SLE	Kevin Wright (substituted on) 70'
Sub	MF	BEL	Charly Musonda (substituted on) 72'

Norwich City
No.	Pos.	Nation	Player
1	GK	ENG	William Britt
2	DF	ENG	Cameron Norman
3	DF	ENG	Ben Wyatt
4	MF	NIR	Cameron McGeehan (c)
5	DF	IRL	Kyle Callan-McFadden
6	DF	ENG	Harry Toffolo
7	MF	ENG	Jacob Murphy
8	MF	ENG	Harry Randall (substituted off) 90'
9	FW	ENG	Carlton Morris
10	MF	SCO	Cameron King (substituted off) 81'
11	MF	ENG	Josh Murphy
Sub	DF	ENG	Kevin Lokko
Sub	GK	ENG	Tyler Reading
Sub	MF	ENG	Harvey Hodd (substituted on) 90'
Sub	MF	ENG	Rod Young (substituted on) 81'
Sub	FW	ANT	Rhys Browne

== 2013–14: Chelsea vs Fulham (2–3 and 5–3, 7–6 aggregate) ==
=== First leg ===
28 April 2014
19:45 BST

Fulham	3–2	Chelsea
Dembélé 69'; Hyndman 71'; Burgess 79'	The FA.com	Dasilva 49'; Musonda 83'

Craven Cottage, Fulham
Attendance: 4,457
Referee: Jonathan Moss

Note: Flags indicate national team as defined under FIFA eligibility rules; some limited exceptions apply. Players may hold more than one non-FIFA nationality.

Fulham
No.	Pos.	Nation	Player
1	GK	SVK	Marek Rodak
2	DF	ENG	Ryheem Sheckleford
3	DF	WAL	Jordan Evans (substituted off) 87'
4	DF	NIR	Liam Donnelly (c)
5	DF	AUS	Cameron Burgess
6	MF	GAM	Solomon Sambou
7	MF	ENG	Josh Smile (substituted off) 63'
8	MF	USA	Emerson Hyndman
9	FW	FRA	Moussa Dembélé
10	FW	ENG	Patrick Roberts (substituted off) 90'
11	MF	WAL	George Williams
Substitutes:
12	GK	ENG	Magnus Norman
14	MF	IRL	Dean O'Halloran (substituted on) 63'
15	DF	IRL	Noe Baba (substituted on) 87'
16	FW	ENG	Aaron Redford
17	FW	ENG	Joshua Walker (substituted on) 90'
Coach: (England) Steve Wigley

Chelsea
No.	Pos.	Nation	Player
1	GK	ENG	Bradley Collins
2	MF	SWE	Isak Ssewankambo
3	DF	DEN	Andreas Christensen
4	DF	ENG	Jake Clarke-Salter
5	DF	NGR	Ola Aina
6	DF	ENG	Jordan Houghton (substituted off) 59'
7	MF	ENG	Isaiah Brown
8	DF	ENG	Ruben Loftus-Cheek (c) (substituted off) 78'
9	FW	ENG	Dominic Solanke (substituted off) 73'
10	MF	ENG	Charlie Colkett
11	DF	WAL	Jay Dasilva
Substitutes:
12	DF	ENG	Fankaty Dabo (substituted on) 78'
14	MF	JAM	Kasey Palmer (substituted on) 59'
15	MF	BEL	Charly Musonda (substituted on) 73'
16	MF	USA	Kyle Scott
17	MF	SCO	Ruben Sammut
Coach: (England) Adi Viveash

=== Second leg ===
5 May 2014
19:45 BST

Chelsea	5–3	Fulham
Colkett 33' (pen.); Houghton 24'; Ssewankambo 77'; Solanke 81', 90'	The FA.com	Dembélé 4'; Roberts 27'; Sambou 37'

Stamford Bridge, London
Attendance: 13,125
Referee: Jonathan Moss

Note: Flags indicate national team as defined under FIFA eligibility rules; some limited exceptions apply. Players may hold more than one non-FIFA nationality.

Chelsea
No.	Pos.	Nation	Player
1	GK	ENG	Mitchell Beeney
2	DF	ENG	Fankaty Dabo
3	DF	DEN	Andreas Christensen (substituted off) 87'
4	DF	ENG	Jake Clarke-Salter (substituted off) 46'
5	DF	WAL	Jay Dasilva
6	DF	ENG	Jordan Houghton
7	FW	JAM	Kasey Palmer
8	MF	ENG	Ruben Loftus-Cheek (substituted off) 46'
9	FW	ENG	Dominic Solanke
10	MF	ENG	Charlie Colkett
11	MF	BEL	Charly Musonda
Substitutes:
12	MF	SWE	Isak Ssewankambo (substituted on) 46'
13	GK	ENG	Bradley Collins
14	FW	ENG	Isaiah Brown (substituted on) 46'
15	DF	NGR	Ola Aina (substituted on) 46'
16	DF	WAL	Isaac Christie-Davies
Coach: (England) Adi Viveash

Fulham
No.	Pos.	Nation	Player
1	GK	SVK	Marek Rodak
2	DF	ENG	Ryheem Sheckleford (substituted off) 88'
3	DF	WAL	Jordan Evans
4	DF	NIR	Liam Donnelly (c)
5	DF	AUS	Cameron Burgess
6	MF	GAM	Solomon Sambou
7	MF	IRL	Dean O'Halloran
8	MF	USA	Emerson Hyndman
9	FW	FRA	Moussa Dembélé
10	FW	ENG	Patrick Roberts
11	MF	WAL	George Williams
Substitutes:
12	GK	ENG	Magnus Norman
14	MF	ENG	Josh Smile (substituted on) 88'
15	DF	IRL	Noe Baba
16	FW	ENG	Aaron Redford
17	FW	ENG	Joshua Walker
Coach: (England) Steve Wigley

== 2014–15: Chelsea vs Manchester City (3–1 and 2–1, 5–2 aggregate) ==
=== First leg ===
20 April 2015
19:45

Manchester City	1–3	Chelsea
Buckley-Ricketts 9'	Report	Abraham 7', 20'; Solanke 90'

Academy Stadium
Attendance: 6,421
Referee: Robert Madley

Note: Flags indicate national team as defined under FIFA eligibility rules; some limited exceptions apply. Players may hold more than one non-FIFA nationality.

Manchester City
No.	Pos.	Nation	Player
1	GK	NOR	Kjetil Haug
2	DF	ESP	Pablo Maffeo
3	DF	ENG	Cameron Humphreys-Grant
4	DF	ENG	Tosin Adarabioyo
5	DF	ESP	Angeliño
6	MF	ENG	Kean Bryan
7	MF	FRA	Aaron Nemane
8	MF	ESP	Manu García (substituted off) 86'
9	FW	ENG	Isaac Buckley-Ricketts
10	MF	KOS	Bersant Celina
11	MF	ENG	Brandon Barker
Substitutes:
12	DF	WAL	Sam Tattum
13	GK	ENG	Charlie Albinson
14	MF	ENG	Sadou Diallo
15	MF	ESP	Paolo Fernandes
16	MF	NED	Javairô Dilrosun (substituted on) 86'
Coach: (England) Jason Wilcox

Chelsea
No.	Pos.	Nation	Player
1	GK	ENG	Bradley Collins
2	DF	NGR	Ola Aina
3	DF	ENG	Fikayo Tomori
4	DF	ENG	Jake Clarke-Salter
5	DF	WAL	Jay Dasilva
6	MF	SCO	Ruben Sammut
7	MF	ENG	Tammy Abraham (substituted off) 67'
8	MF	ENG	Charlie Colkett
9	FW	ENG	Dominic Solanke
10	MF	BEL	Charly Musonda (substituted off) 90'
11	MF	ENG	Isaiah Brown (substituted off) 90'
Substitutes:
12	MF	USA	Kyle Scott (substituted on) 90'
13	GK	NIR	Jared Thompson
14	FW	JAM	Kasey Palmer (substituted on) 67'
15	DF	ENG	Josh Grant
16	FW	CIV	Jérémie Boga (substituted on) 90'
Coach: (England) Joe Edwards

=== Second leg ===
27 April 2015
19:45

Chelsea	2–1	Manchester City
Brown 20'; Abraham 46'	Report	Iheanacho 6'

Stamford Bridge
Attendance: 10,969
Referee: Robert Madley

Note: Flags indicate national team as defined under FIFA eligibility rules; some limited exceptions apply. Players may hold more than one non-FIFA nationality.

Chelsea
No.	Pos.	Nation	Player
1	GK	ENG	Bradley Collins
2	DF	NGR	Ola Aina
3	DF	ENG	Fikayo Tomori
4	DF	ENG	Jake Clarke-Salter
5	DF	WAL	Jay Dasilva
6	MF	ENG	Charlie Colkett
7	FW	ENG	Tammy Abraham (substituted off) 68'
8	MF	BEL	Charly Musonda (substituted off) 84'
9	FW	ENG	Dominic Solanke
10	FW	CIV	Jérémie Boga (substituted off) 74'
11	MF	ENG	Isaiah Brown
Substitutes:
12	MF	SCO	Ruben Sammut (substituted on) 68'
13	GK	NIR	Jared Thompson
14	FW	JAM	Kasey Palmer (substituted on) 74'
15	MF	KSA	Mukhtar Ali (substituted on) 84'
16	DF	ENG	Josh Grant
Coach: (England) Joe Edwards

Manchester City
No.	Pos.	Nation	Player
1	GK	NOR	Christian Haug
2	DF	ESP	Pablo Maffeo
3	DF	ENG	Cameron Humphreys-Grant
4	DF	ENG	Tosin Adarabioyo
5	DF	ESP	Angeliño
6	MF	ENG	Kean Bryan
7	MF	FRA	Aaron Nemane
8	MF	ENG	Marcus Wood (substituted off) 68'
9	FW	NGR	Kelechi Iheanacho (substituted off) 71'
10	MF	KOS	Bersant Celina
11	MF	ENG	Brandon Barker
Substitutes:
12	DF	WAL	Sam Tattum
13	GK	ENG	Charlie Albinson
14	MF	ESP	Manu García (substituted on) 68'
15	MF	NED	Javairô Dilrosun
16	MF	ENG	Isaac Buckley-Ricketts (substituted on) 71'
Coach: (England) Jason Wilcox

== 2015–16: Chelsea vs Manchester City (1–1 and 3–1, 4–2 aggregate) ==
=== First leg ===
22 April 2016
19:45

Manchester City	1–1	Chelsea
Nemane 68'	Report	Mount 50'

Academy Stadium
Attendance: 4,084
Referee: Paul Tierney

Note: Flags indicate national team as defined under FIFA eligibility rules; some limited exceptions apply. Players may hold more than one non-FIFA nationality.

Manchester City
No.	Pos.	Nation	Player
1	GK	ENG	Daniel Grimshaw
2	DF	ENG	Charlie Oliver
3	DF	ENG	Cameron Humphreys-Grant
4	DF	ENG	Tosin Adarabioyo
5	DF	JAM	Joel Latibeaudiere (substituted off) 88'
6	MF	ENG	Jacob Davenport
7	MF	FRA	Aaron Nemane (substituted off) 90'
8	MF	NED	Rodney Kongolo
9	FW	GER	Lukas Nmecha
10	MF	ESP	Manu García (substituted off) 59'
11	MF	MAR	Brahim Diaz
Substitutes:
12	MF	ENG	Marcus Wood (substituted on) 88'
13	GK	NOR	Kjetil Haug
14	MF	NGR	Tom Dele-Bashiru
15	MF	ENG	Jadon Sancho (substituted on) 90'
16	MF	ENG	Isaac Buckley-Ricketts (substituted on) 59'
Coach: (England) Jason Wilcox

Chelsea
No.	Pos.	Nation	Player
1	GK	ENG	Nathan Baxter
2	DF	ENG	Trevoh Chalobah (substituted off) 77'
3	DF	ENG	Fikayo Tomori
4	DF	ENG	Jake Clarke-Salter
5	DF	WAL	Jay Dasilva
6	MF	SCO	Ruben Sammut
7	MF	ENG	Dujon Sterling
8	MF	KSA	Mukhtar Ali (substituted off) 61'
9	FW	CAN	Ike Ugbo (substituted off) 70'
10	MF	ENG	Mason Mount
11	MF	WAL	Isaac Christie-Davies
Substitutes:
12	DF	ENG	Josh Grant (substituted on) 77'
13	GK	NIR	Jared Thompson
14	MF	USA	Kyle Scott (substituted on) 61'
15	MF	ENG	Jacob Maddox (substituted on) 70'
16	MF	ENG	Charlie Wakefield
Coach: (England) Joe Edwards

=== Second leg ===
27 April 2016
19:45

Chelsea	3–1	Manchester City
Sterling 45+2'; Abraham 53'; Tomori 73'	Report	Diaz 87'

Stamford Bridge
Attendance: 8,530
Referee: Paul Tierney

Note: Flags indicate national team as defined under FIFA eligibility rules; some limited exceptions apply. Players may hold more than one non-FIFA nationality.

Chelsea
No.	Pos.	Nation	Player
1	GK	ENG	Nathan Baxter
2	DF	ENG	Trevoh Chalobah (substituted off) 77'
3	DF	ENG	Fikayo Tomori
4	DF	ENG	Jake Clarke-Salter
5	DF	WAL	Jay Dasilva
6	MF	SCO	Ruben Sammut
7	MF	ENG	Dujon Sterling (substituted off) 83'
8	MF	KSA	Mukhtar Ali
9	FW	ENG	Tammy Abraham
10	MF	ENG	Mason Mount
11	MF	WAL	Isaac Christie-Davies (substituted off) 64'
Substitutes:
12	DF	ENG	Josh Grant (substituted on) 77'
13	GK	NIR	Jared Thompson
14	FW	CAN	Ike Ugbo (substituted on) 83'
15	MF	ENG	Jacob Maddox (substituted on) 64'
16	MF	ENG	Charlie Wakefield
Coach: (England) Joe Edwards

Manchester City
No.	Pos.	Nation	Player
1	GK	ENG	Daniel Grimshaw
2	DF	ENG	Charlie Oliver
3	DF	ENG	Cameron Humphreys-Grant
4	DF	ENG	Tosin Adarabioyo (substituted off) 75'
5	DF	JAM	Joel Latibeaudiere (substituted off) 12'
6	MF	ENG	Jacob Davenport
7	MF	ENG	Isaac Buckley-Ricketts
8	MF	NED	Rodney Kongolo
9	FW	GER	Lukas Nmecha
10	MF	MAR	Brahim Diaz
11	MF	FRA	Aaron Nemane (substituted off) 64'
Substitutes:
12	MF	ENG	Marcus Wood (substituted on) 12'
13	GK	NOR	Kjetil Haug
14	MF	NGR	Tom Dele-Bashiru (substituted on) 75'
15	MF	ESP	Manu García
16	MF	ENG	Jadon Sancho (substituted on) 64'
Coach: (England) Jason Wilcox

== 2016–17: Chelsea vs Manchester City (1–1 and 5–1, 6–2 aggregate) ==
=== First leg ===
18 April 2017
19:45

Manchester City	1–1	Chelsea
Foden 62'	Report	Ugbo 44'

Academy Stadium
Attendance: 3,392
Referee: Oliver Langford

Note: Flags indicate national team as defined under FIFA eligibility rules; some limited exceptions apply. Players may hold more than one non-FIFA nationality.

Manchester City
No.	Pos.	Nation	Player
1	GK	KOS	Aro Muric
2	DF	ENG	Demeaco Duhaney
3	DF	ENG	Sadou Diallo
4	DF	ENG	Ed Francis
5	DF	IRL	Tyreke Wilson
6	MF	ENG	Jacob Davenport
7	MF	MAR	Brahim Diaz
8	MF	WAL	Matt Smith
9	FW	GER	Lukas Nmecha
10	MF	ENG	Phil Foden (substituted off) 85'
11	MF	ENG	Jadon Sancho (substituted off) 90'
Substitutes:
12	DF	NED	Jeremie Frimpong
13	GK	POL	Paweł Sokół
14	MF	NGR	Tom Dele-Bashiru (substituted on) 90'
15	FW	ENG	Luke Bolton (substituted on) 85'
16	FW	SUI	Lorenzo González
Coach: (Republic of Ireland) Lee Carsley

Chelsea
No.	Pos.	Nation	Player
1	GK	NIR	Jared Thompson
2	DF	ENG	Reece James
3	DF	ENG	Trevoh Chalobah
4	DF	ENG	Marc Guéhi
5	MF	DOM	Juan Castillo
6	MF	ENG	Tariq Uwakwe (substituted off) 90'
7	MF	ENG	Dujon Sterling
8	MF	ENG	Jacob Maddox
9	FW	CAN	Ike Ugbo (substituted off) 86'
10	FW	ENG	Mason Mount
11	FW	ENG	Callum Hudson-Odoi
Substitutes:
12	DF	SWE	Joseph Colley
13	GK	ENG	Jamie Cumming
14	DF	WAL	Cole Dasilva
15	MF	ENG	Conor Gallagher (substituted on) 90'
16	MF	SCO	Harvey St Clair (substituted on) 86'
Coach: (England) Jody Morris

=== Second leg ===
27 April 2017
19:45

Chelsea	5–1	Manchester City
Chalobah 7'; Ugbo 24'; Hudson-Odoi 60'; Sterling 66'; Dasilva 87'	Report	Nmecha 52'

Stamford Bridge
Attendance: 5,000
Referee: Oliver Langford

Note: Flags indicate national team as defined under FIFA eligibility rules; some limited exceptions apply. Players may hold more than one non-FIFA nationality.

Chelsea
No.	Pos.	Nation	Player
1	GK	ENG	Jamie Cumming
2	DF	ENG	Reece James
3	DF	ENG	Trevoh Chalobah
4	DF	ENG	Marc Guéhi
5	MF	DOM	Juan Castillo
6	MF	ENG	Tariq Uwakwe (substituted off) 80'
7	MF	ENG	Dujon Sterling
8	MF	ENG	Jacob Maddox
9	FW	CAN	Ike Ugbo (substituted off) 77'
10	FW	ENG	Mason Mount
11	FW	ENG	Callum Hudson-Odoi (substituted off) 83'
Substitutes:
12	DF	WAL	Cole Dasilva (substituted on) 83'
13	GK	POL	Marcin Bułka
14	MF	ENG	Conor Gallagher
15	MF	ENG	George McEachran (substituted on) 80'
16	FW	ENG	Martell Taylor-Crossdale (substituted on) 77'
Coach: (England) Jody Morris

Manchester City
No.	Pos.	Nation	Player
1	GK	KOS	Aro Muric
2	DF	ENG	Demeaco Duhaney
3	DF	ENG	Sadou Diallo
4	DF	ENG	Ed Francis
5	DF	IRL	Tyreke Wilson
6	MF	ENG	Jacob Davenport (substituted off) 45'
7	MF	MAR	Brahim Diaz (substituted off) 80'
8	MF	WAL	Matt Smith
9	FW	GER	Lukas Nmecha
10	MF	ENG	Phil Foden
11	MF	ENG	Jadon Sancho (substituted off) 77'
Substitutes:
12	DF	NED	Jeremie Frimpong
13	GK	POL	Paweł Sokół
14	MF	NGR	Tom Dele-Bashiru (substituted on) 80'
15	FW	ENG	Luke Bolton (substituted on) 45'
16	FW	SUI	Lorenzo González (substituted on) 77'
Coach: (Republic of Ireland) Lee Carsley

== 2017–18: Chelsea vs Arsenal (3–1 and 4–0, 7–1 aggregate) ==
=== First leg ===
27 April 2018
19:45

Chelsea	3–1	Arsenal
Redan 67', 86'; Guéhi 78'	Report	Amaechi 36'

Stamford Bridge
Attendance: 4,878
Referee: Tim Robinson

Note: Flags indicate national team as defined under FIFA eligibility rules; some limited exceptions apply. Players may hold more than one non-FIFA nationality.

Chelsea
No.	Pos.	Nation	Player
1	GK	ENG	Jamie Cumming
2	DF	GHA	Tariq Lamptey (substituted off) 85'
3	DF	ENG	Reece James
4	DF	ENG	Marc Guéhi
5	DF	ENG	Jonathan Panzo
6	MF	ENG	Conor Gallagher
7	MF	ENG	Tariq Uwakwe (substituted off) 45'
8	MF	SCO	Billy Gilmour
9	FW	ENG	Charlie Brown (substituted off) 61'
10	MF	ENG	George McEachran
11	MF	ENG	Callum Hudson-Odoi
Substitutes:
12	DF	ENG	Dujon Sterling (substituted on) 45'
13	GK	CRO	Karlo Žiger
14	FW	NED	Daishawn Redan (substituted on) 61'
15	MF	DOM	Juan Castillo (substituted on) 85'
16	MF	ENG	Tino Anjorin
Coach: (England) Jody Morris

Arsenal
No.	Pos.	Nation	Player
1	GK	POR	João Virgínia
2	DF	ENG	Vontae Daley-Campbell
3	DF	ENG	Dominic Thompson
4	MF	WAL	Robbie Burton
5	DF	NIR	Daniel Ballard
6	DF	ENG	Zech Medley (substituted off) 88'
7	FW	ENG	James Olayinka
8	MF	WAL	Matthew Smith (substituted off) 67'
9	FW	ENG	Tyreece John-Jules
10	MF	ENG	Emile Smith Rowe (substituted off) 62'
11	MF	ENG	Xavier Amaechi
Substitutes:
12	DF	ENG	Tobi Omole
13	GK	WAL	Daniel Barden
14	MF	ENG	Trae Coyle (substituted on) 62'
15	DF	ENG	Bukayo Saka (substituted on) 67'
16	DF	NGR	Joseph Olowu (substituted on) 88'
Coach: (Republic of Ireland) Kwame Ampadu

=== Second leg ===
30 April 2018
19:45

Arsenal	0–4	Chelsea
	Report	Gilmour 10'; Hudson-Odoi 55', 76'; Anjorin 67'

Emirates Stadium
Attendance: 3,877
Referee: Tim Robinson

Note: Flags indicate national team as defined under FIFA eligibility rules; some limited exceptions apply. Players may hold more than one non-FIFA nationality.

Arsenal
No.	Pos.	Nation	Player
1	GK	POR	João Virgínia
2	DF	ENG	Vontae Daley-Campbell
3	DF	ENG	Dominic Thompson
4	MF	WAL	Robbie Burton
5	DF	NIR	Daniel Ballard (substituted off) 76'
6	DF	NGR	Joseph Olowu
7	DF	ENG	Bukayo Saka
8	FW	ENG	James Olayinka
9	FW	ENG	Tyreece John-Jules (substituted off) 70'
10	MF	ENG	Emile Smith Rowe
11	MF	ENG	Xavier Amaechi (substituted off) 62'
Substitutes:
12	FW	USA	Folarin Balogun (substituted on) 62'
13	GK	WAL	Daniel Barden
14	MF	ENG	Trae Coyle (substituted on) 70'
15	MF	WAL	Matthew Smith
16	DF	ENG	Zech Medley (substituted on) 76'
Coach: (Republic of Ireland) Kwame Ampadu

Chelsea
No.	Pos.	Nation	Player
1	GK	ENG	Jamie Cumming
2	DF	ENG	Reece James
3	DF	ENG	Marc Guéhi
4	DF	ENG	Jonathan Panzo
5	MF	DOM	Juan Castillo
6	MF	ENG	Conor Gallagher (substituted off) 60'
7	DF	ENG	Dujon Sterling
8	MF	SCO	Billy Gilmour
9	FW	NED	Daishawn Redan (substituted off) 70'
10	MF	ENG	George McEachran (substituted off) 60'
11	MF	ENG	Callum Hudson-Odoi
Substitutes:
12	DF	GHA	Tariq Lamptey
13	GK	ENG	Jake Askew
14	FW	ENG	Charlie Brown (substituted on) 70'
15	MF	ENG	Clinton Mola (substituted on) 60'
16	MF	ENG	Tino Anjorin (substituted on) 60'
Coach: (England) Jody Morris

== 2018–19: Manchester City 1–1 Liverpool (3–5 on pens) ==
25 April 2019
19:45

Manchester City	1–1 (a.e.t.)	Liverpool
Touaizi 45+2'	Report	Duncan 86'
Penalties
Nmecha (penalty scored); Palmer (penalty missed); Doyle (penalty scored); Dele-Bashiru (penalty scored)	3–5	Williams (penalty scored); Dixon-Bonner (penalty scored); Sharif (penalty scored); Bearne (penalty scored); Glatzel (penalty scored)

Academy Stadium
Attendance: 3,878

Note: Flags indicate national team as defined under FIFA eligibility rules; some limited exceptions apply. Players may hold more than one non-FIFA nationality.

Manchester City
No.	Pos.	Nation	Player
1	GK	ENG	Louie Moulden
2	DF	SEN	Alpha Diounkou
3	DF	ESP	Eric García (substituted off) 59'
4	DF	ENG	Taylor Harwood-Bellis (substituted off) 116'
5	DF	NED	Jeremie Frimpong
6	DF	ENG	Rowan McDonald
7	MF	ENG	Ben Knight (substituted off) 90+4'
8	MF	ENG	Tommy Doyle
9	FW	MAR	Nabil Touaizi
10	MF	GER	Felix Nmecha
11	MF	ESP	Adrián Bernabé (substituted off) 107'
Substitutes:
—	GK	IRL	Gavin Bazunu
16	MF	ENG	Cole Palmer (substituted on) 107'
12	DF	ENG	Nathanael Ogbeta (substituted on) 90+4'
14	MF	NGR	Fisayo Dele-Bashiru (substituted on) 59'
15	FW	ENG	Henri Ogunby (substituted on) 116'
Coach: (Wales) Gareth Taylor

Liverpool
No.	Pos.	Nation	Player
1	GK	CZE	Vítězslav Jaroš
2	DF	WAL	Neco Williams
3	DF	ALG	Yasser Larouci
4	DF	ENG	Rhys Williams
5	MF	WAL	Morgan Boyes
6	MF	ENG	Leighton Clarkson (substituted off) 78'
7	MF	SOM	Abdi Sharif
8	MF	ENG	Jake Cain (substituted off) 101'
9	FW	GER	Paul Glatzel
10	FW	ENG	Bobby Duncan
11	MF	ENG	Elijah Dixon-Bonner
Substitutes:
—	GK	ENG	Oscar Kelly
—	FW	ENG	Fidel O'Rourke
—	FW	ENG	Remi Savage
15	MF	ENG	Luis Longstaff (substituted on) 78'
16	MF	ENG	Jack Bearne (substituted on) 101'
Coach: (England) Barry Lewtas
