= Oliver Reiß =

German football manager (born 1983)

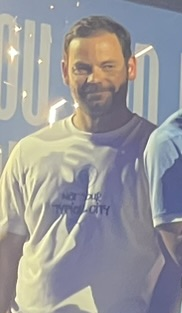
- Reiß in 2026

Personal information
- Date of birth: 16 January 1983 (age 43)
- Place of birth: Berlin, Germany

Managerial career
- Years: Team
- 2007–2024: Hertha BSC (youth)
- 2024–: Manchester City (youth)

Oliver Reiß (born 16 January 1983) is a German football manager who is a youth manager of Manchester City.

== Early life ==
Reiß was born on 16 January 1983 in Berlin, Germany. A native of the city, his father operated a youth academy in Germany. Growing up, he studied sports science.

== Career ==
At the age of twenty-four, Reiß was appointed as a youth manager of German Bundesliga side Hertha BSC, where he worked with German football manager Thomas Krücken. English newspaper Manchester Evening News wrote in 2024 that he "developed a reputation as a 'tactical genius'... and is considered one of the best youth coaches in the game... responsible for bringing through a number of Bundesliga players from the academy" while managing the club's under-19 team.

Following his stint there, he was appointed as a youth manager of English Premier League side Manchester City ahead of the 2024–25 season, helping the club's under-18 team win the North division title.
