= Manchester City F.C. Under-21s and Academy =

Manchester City is represented at Reserve level for football by the Elite Development Squad, also referred to as just the Elite Squad, or EDS, a predominantly Under-23 side that replaced the previous (more senior) Reserve team in a move to focus on youth development post-academy. The club is represented at the Under-18 level by the Manchester City Academy team.

Manchester City most recently won the 2025–26 FA Youth Cup.

== Elite Development Squad ==
Man City Elite Development Squad
- Full name: Manchester City Elite Development Squad
- Founded: 2009
- Ground: Academy Stadium; Sportcity, Manchester, England
- Capacity: 7,000 (5,000 seated)
- Chairman: Khaldoon Al Mubarak
- Manager: Oliver Reiß
- League: Professional Development League
Home colours	Away colours	Third colours

The Elite Development Squad have played in the Under 21 Premier League since the 2012–13 season and previously played in the Premier Reserve League North. Starting with the 2011–12 season, the EDS competed in the NextGen Series competition, a Champions League format tournament only open to a select group of 'Under-19' teams located in western Europe. The NextGen Series organisers invited the 16 teams competing in the inaugural season of this new competition based on which clubs were considered to have the best academies in Europe. At the time, the EDS continued to play fixtures in both the Manchester Senior Cup and Lancashire Senior Cup plus several other matches and tournaments such as the Central League Cup.

In 2016-17 the U-21 Premier League was renamed as Premier League 2 and the age limit was raised to U-23. City won their first title at this level in the 2020–21 season and retained their title in 2021–22.

The UEFA Youth League launched in 2013–14, replacing the NextGen series, as a U-19 competition for the youth teams of Champions League participants and national champions at U-18 level. Teams fielded by City in this competition were therefore a hybrid of their EDS and academy squads. Their best performance to date has been a semi-final appearance in 2017–18.

Manchester City has fielded a reserve team since 1892 when the reserves played in the Lancashire Combination. The reserves were champions of the Lancashire Combination in 1901–02. The club left the Lancashire Combination in 1911 to join the Central League upon its formation. The City reserve team then played in the Central League until 2000, winning it on three occasions in the 1977–78, 1986–87 and 1999–2000 seasons. In 2006, the club re-entered the Central League – now the Pontin's League (West) – but this time in order to provide games for the 'Under-17' age group of players.

In recent seasons, Manchester City has purchased, registered and loaned young international players as part of their development strategy for the City Football Group. Although these players are officially Manchester City players, they have never made competitive appearances for City's senior or youth teams and may in future be transferred out before doing so. In 2022, FIFA have implemented new rules which will now restrict loans of this nature.

=== Home ground ===
The EDS play all of their home fixtures at the Joie Stadium.

=== Squad numbers ===
The squad numbers depicted for the EDS players in this article are the MCFC first team squad numbers – which means that these are the shirt numbers that the EDS players will wear if and when team-sheeted to play for the MCFC first team in either a friendly or competitive game. The current MCFC official first team squad consists of only about 20 players, however, the EDS players' squad numbers traditionally start in the region of the middle forties. For the Premier League 2, players use the 1–11 numbering system whilst squad numbers (including player names) are used for the EFL Trophy.

The Manchester City first team squad numbers are normally assigned and published in late July during the close season and they stay the same for the entire duration of the upcoming season (meaning that a squad number that is assigned to a player in the close season who subsequently wears that number in a competitive match, but who later leaves the club during that same season, will not be assigned to another player during the remainder of that season).

=== Current squad ===
As of 6 September 2026

Note: Flags indicate national team as defined under FIFA eligibility rules; some limited exceptions apply. Players may hold more than one non-FIFA nationality.

No.	Pos.	Nation	Player
48	FW	ENG	Brooklyn Nfonkeu
55	DF	ENG	Harrison Parker
59	DF	ENG	Josh Wilson-Esbrand
60	MF	ENG	Femi Fapetu
69	GK	WAL	Max Hudson
70	DF	ENG	Marlow Barrett
73	MF	ENG	Xavier Parker
74	DF	ENG	Charlie Courtman
76	MF	ENG	Dexter Oliver
79	FW	ENG	Teddie Lamb
83	DF	ENG	Leke Drake
86	FW	ENG	Christian Dunbar-McDonald

No.	Pos.	Nation	Player
87	MF	ENG	Finlay Gorman
88	DF	ENG	Dante Headley
89	DF	ENG	Matthew Henderson-Hall
90	DF	ENG	Kian Noble
92	DF	ENG	Oliver Tevenan
93	MF	ENG	Jake Wain
94	GK	FRA	Max-Edgar Chabot
96	MF	ENG	Harrison Miles
97	FW	FRA	Tyrone Samba
98	FW	ENG	Kylan Midwood
99	GK	SCO	Ben Vickery
—	DF	WAL	Rhys Thomas

==== EDS players out on loan ====
These are EDS players who have previously made competitive appearances for the Manchester City Academy, EDS or First Team, or have been brought with the explicit intention to join the first team in future.

Note: Flags indicate national team as defined under FIFA eligibility rules; some limited exceptions apply. Players may hold more than one non-FIFA nationality.

No.	Pos.	Nation	Player
46	DF	ENG	Christian McFarlane (at Leicester City until 30 June 2027)
59	MF	ENG	Charlie Gray (at Wigan Athletic until 30 June 2027)
63	MF	ENG	Divine Mukasa (at West Ham United until 30 June 2027)
64	MF	ENG	Isaiah Dada-Mascoll (at Lommel SK until 30 June 2027)
67	FW	ENG	Divin Mubama (at Southampton until 30 June 2027)
72	GK	ENG	Oliver Whatmuff (at Stockport County until 31 May 2027)
80	GK	ENG	Spike Brits (at Sutton United until 31st May 2027)

No.	Pos.	Nation	Player
81	FW	ENG	Jaden Heskey (at Sheffield Wednesday until 30 June 2027)
84	GK	ENG	Jack Wint (at Kidderminster Harriers until 31 May 2027)
91	DF	ENG	Stephen Mfuni (at Coventry City until 31 May 2027)
95	DF	ENG	Lakyle Samuel (at Exeter City until 31 May 2027)
99	MF	SCO	Emilio Lawrence (at Luton Town until 31 May 2027)
—	DF	SLE	Juma Bah (at Augsburg until 30 June 2027)}

=== Reserve/EDS Manager history ===
Manager	From	To	Honours
(England) Tony Book	1986	1996	1987 Central League
(Scotland) Asa Hartford	1996	2004	2000 Central League, 2001 Manchester Senior Cup
(England) Steve Wigley	2004	2006	2005 Manchester Senior Cup
(England) Frankie Bunn	2006	2007	
(Wales) Kenny Jackett	2007	2007	2007 Manchester Senior Cup
(Scotland) Ian Miller	2007	2008	2008 Central League
(Wales) Glyn Hodges	2008	2009	
(England) Andy Welsh	2009	2012	2010 Manchester Senior Cup
(Italy) Attilio Lombardo	2012	2013	
(France) Patrick Vieira	2013	2016	2015 Premier League International Cup
(Wales) Simon Davies	2016	2018	
(England) Paul Harsley	2018	2020	
(Italy) Enzo Maresca	2020	2021	2021 Premier League 2
(Republic of Ireland) Brian Barry-Murphy	2021	2024	2022 and 2023 Premier League 2
(England) Ben Wilkinson	2024	2026	2025 Premier League 2
(Germany) Oliver Reiß	2026	present	

== Academy ==
Man City Academy
- Full name: Manchester City Academy
- Nicknames: The Citizens, City, The Boy Blues
- Ground: Academy Stadium; Sportcity, Manchester, England
- Capacity: 7,000 (5,000 seated)
- Chairman: Khaldoon Al Mubarak
- Manager: Lauris Coggin
- League: Professional Development League
Home colours	Away colours	Third colours

Manchester City's Academy is responsible for youth development at the club, with the goal of developing young players for the future. The academy is one of the most revered in the country and since its new incarnation in 1998, it has produced more professional players than any other Premier League club.

=== History ===
The club's first youth team was set up by Albert Alexander in the 1920s, known as the 'A' Team. From 1951 the 'A' team competed in the Lancashire League against reserve and youth teams of other clubs from North West England. From 1955 a second youth team, the 'B' team, typically comprising younger players than the 'A' team, competed in Division Two of the Lancashire League.

Youth football in England was restructured by the Football Association in 1997, with the introduction of the Academy system. Current International Youth Academy Director Jim Cassell joined from Oldham Athletic in July 1997 and was responsible for building Manchester City's youth structure, which gained Academy accreditation in 1998.

In its new incarnation, the 'A' and 'B' teams were replaced with 'Under-19' and 'Under-17' teams, which competed in the FA Premier Youth League. Since gaining FA approval in 1998 the academy has produced 95 players for Manchester City's first team, 43 of whom have gained full international honours, including England internationals Shaun Wright-Phillips, Micah Richards, Joey Barton, Daniel Sturridge, Phil Foden, Cole Palmer and Rico Lewis.The academy not only produces players for Manchester City but also players that have the talent to make the grade elsewhere, with players such as Ben Mee who's had a successful career at Burnley and Brentford, Jadon Sancho at Borussia Dortmund and Manchester United, Kelechi Iheanacho at Leicester and Kieran Trippier formerly at Burnley, Spurs, Atlético Madrid and now at Newcastle United.

=== Present day ===
Since the club was taken over in September 2008, with extra capital and increased ambitions the club looked to expand their successful academy further afield and City in the Community programme in Manchester. In 2010, the Platt Lane complex was upgraded to include new facilities, such as a gym, changing rooms, as well as office and seminar space The club also launched an instructional video website aimed at helping the new skills of prospective footballers

City announced on 19 September 2011 that they would build an 80-acre training facility, known since as the City Football Academy to cater for around 400 youth players at a time, the campus was opened on 8 December 2014, and has since become the base for all senior and youth Manchester City men's and women's teams.

=== Squad numbers ===
The squad numbers (if any) depicted for the academy players in this article are MCFC first-team squad numbers – which means that these are the shirt numbers that the academy players will wear if and when they are selected to play for the MCFC first team in either a friendly or competitive game.

=== Current squad ===
As of 16 August 2025

Note: Flags indicate national team as defined under FIFA eligibility rules; some limited exceptions apply. Players may hold more than one non-FIFA nationality.

No.	Pos.	Nation	Player
—	GK	ENG	Finley Grigg
—	GK	ENG	Ben Vickery
—	GK	ENG	Toran Mathiesan
—	DF	ENG	Marlow Barrett
—	DF	ENG	Theo Carrington
—	DF	ENG	Yohann Obin
—	DF	ENG	Freddie Lawrie
—	DF	ENG	Archie Thornton
—	DF	ENG	Jake Wain
—	DF	ENG	Alfie Turley
—	MF	ENG	Charlie Holt

No.	Pos.	Nation	Player
—	MF	ENG	Milo Martin
—	MF	SCO	Keir McMeekin
—	MF	ENG	Dexter Oliver
—	MF	ENG	Sam Wadsworth
—	MF	ENG	Jaxon Shire
—	FW	ENG	Teddie Lamb
—	FW	ENG	Timeo Whisker
—	FW	JAM	Caelan Cadamarteri
—	FW	ENG	Tireni Ayegbusi
—	FW	ENG	Darren Motsi
—	FW	ENG	Javahn Woode

=== Current technical staff ===
Position	Name
Manager	(England) Lauris Coggin
Assistant manager	(Republic of Ireland) Richard Dunne
Goalkeeper coach	(England) Max Johnson
Fitness coach	(England) Danny Campbell

=== Academy Manager history ===
Manager	From	To	Honours
(Scotland) Neil McNab	1994	1997	
(England) Jim Cassell	1997	2009	2007–08 FA Youth Cup
(England) Steve Eyre	2009	2011	
(England) Adam Sadler	2011	2013	
(England) Jason Wilcox	2013	2016	2015–16 Professional U18 Development League
(Republic of Ireland) Lee Carsley	2016	2017	
(England) Gareth Taylor	2017	2020	2018–19 & 2019–20 U18 Premier League Cup
(Spain) Carlos Vicens	2020	2021	2019–20 FA Youth Cup, 2020–21 Professional U18 Development League
(England) Ben Wilkinson	2021	2024	2021–22 and 2022–23 Professional U18 Development League, 2023–24 FA Youth Cup
(Germany) Oliver Reiss	2024	2026	2025–26 FA Youth Cup
(England) Lauris Coggin	2026	present	

=== Academy graduates (1998–present) ===
These are the academy players who have made at least one competitive appearance for the Manchester City first team.
Academy graduates who still play for Manchester City, including those that are currently out on loan to other clubs, are highlighted in blue.
Updated 1 September 2022

==== Retired from playing or unattached players ====
Player	Level (Note: Highest level determined from)	Main other clubs played for	Born	International Honours	Debut	Manager
Shaun Wright-Phillips	(England) 1	Chelsea, Queens Park Rangers , New York Red Bulls, Phoenix Rising	London	Full England Caps	Age 17 v Burnley, 24 Aug. 1999	Joe Royle
Terry Dunfield	(England) 1	Bury, Macclesfield Town, Shrewsbury Town, Toronto	Vancouver	Full Canada Caps	Age 19 v Chelsea, 11 May 2001	Joe Royle
Chris Shuker	(England) 1	Barnsley, Tranmere Rovers, Morecambe, Port Vale	Liverpool	—N/a	Age 19 v Notts County, 11 Sep. 2001	Kevin Keegan
Dickson Etuhu	(England) 1	Preston North End, Norwich City, Fulham	Kano	Full Nigeria Caps	Age 19 v Birmingham City, 15 Sep. 2001	Kevin Keegan
Leon Mike	(England) 2	Aberdeen	Manchester	England U18	Age 19 v Portsmouth, 16 Nov. 2001	Kevin Keegan
Chris Killen	(England) 2	Oldham Athletic, Hibernian, Celtic, Chongqing	Wellington	Full New Zealand Caps	Age 20 v Rotherham United, 24 Nov. 2001	Kevin Keegan
Tyrone Mears	(England) 1	Preston North End, Derby County, Burnley, Bolton Wanderers, Seattle Sounders FC	Manchester	(Jamaica) Full Jamaican Caps	Age 19 v Nottingham Forest, 30 Mar. 2002	Kevin Keegan
Joey Barton	(England) 1	Newcastle, Queens Park Rangers, Marseille, Burnley	Liverpool	Full England Cap	Age 21 v Bolton Wanderers, 5 Apr. 2003	Kevin Keegan
Stephen Jordan	(England) 1	Burnley, Fleetwood Town, Chorley	Liverpool	—N/a	Age 21 v Bolton Wanderers, 5 Apr. 2003	Kevin Keegan
Willo Flood	(England) 1	Cardiff City, Dundee United, Aberdeen	Dublin	(Republic of Ireland) Ireland U21	Age 18 v Total Network Solutions, 28 Aug. 2003	Kevin Keegan
Glenn Whelan	(England) 1	Sheffield Wednesday, Stoke City, Aston Villa, Fleetwood Town, Bristol Rovers	Dublin	(Republic of Ireland) Full Ireland Caps	Age 19 v Total Network Solutions, 28 Aug. 2003	Kevin Keegan
Stephen Elliott	(England) 1	Sunderland, Wolverhampton Wanderers, Preston North End, Hearts	Dublin	(Republic of Ireland) Full Ireland Caps	Age 20 v Bolton Wanderers, 21 Feb. 2004	Kevin Keegan
Bradley Wright-Phillips	(England) 1	Southampton, Plymouth Argyle, Charlton Athletic, New York Red Bulls	London	England U20	Age 19 v Barnsley, 21 Sep. 2004	Kevin Keegan
Nedum Onuoha	(England) 1	Sunderland, Queens Park Rangers, Real Salt Lake	Warri	England U21	Age 18 v Arsenal, 24 Oct. 2004	Kevin Keegan
Jonathan D'Laryea	(England) 4	Mansfield Town, Gainsborough Trinity	Manchester	—N/a	Age 19 v Arsenal, 24 Oct. 2004	Kevin Keegan
Lee Croft	(England) 1	Norwich City, Derby County, Oldham Athletic, St Johnstone	Wigan	England U20	Age 19 v Bolton Wanderers, 7 Mar. 2005	Kevin Keegan
Stephen Ireland	(England) 1	Aston Villa, Stoke City	Cork	(Republic of Ireland) Full Ireland Caps	Age 19 v Bolton Wanderers, 18 Sep. 2005	Stuart Pearce
Micah Richards	(England) 1	Aston Villa	Birmingham	Full England Caps	Age 17 v Arsenal, 22 Oct. 2005	Stuart Pearce
Ishmael Miller	(England) 1	West Bromwich Albion, Nottingham Forest, Middlesbrough, Huddersfield Town	Manchester	England U21	Age 19 v Wigan Athletic, 18 Mar. 2006	Stuart Pearce
Michael Johnson	(England) 1		Manchester	England U21	Age 18 v Wigan Athletic, 21 Oct. 2006	Stuart Pearce
Daniel Sturridge	(England) 1	Chelsea, Liverpool, Trabzonspor	Birmingham	Full England Caps	Age 17 v Reading, 3 Feb. 2007	Stuart Pearce
Kasper Schmeichel	(England) 1	Notts County, Leicester City, Celtic	Copenhagen	Full Denmark Caps	Age 19 v West Ham United, 11 Aug. 2007	Sven-Göran Eriksson
Shaleum Logan	(England) 1	Tranmere Rovers, Brentford, Aberdeen, Cove Rangers	Manchester	—N/a	Age 19 v Bristol City, 29 Aug. 2007	Sven-Göran Eriksson
Kelvin Etuhu	(England) 1	Barnsley, Bury, Carlisle United	Kano	—N/a	Age 19 v Norwich City, 25 Sep. 2007	Sven-Göran Eriksson
Sam Williamson	(England) 1	Wrexham	Manchester	—N/a	Age 20 v Portsmouth, 20 Apr. 2008	Sven-Göran Eriksson
Vladimír Weiss	(England) 1	Lekhwiya SC, Al-Gharafa, Slovan Bratislava	Bratislava	Full Slovakia Caps	Age 19 v Bolton Wanderers, 24 May 2009	Roberto Mancini
Dedryck Boyata	(England) 1	Celtic, Hertha BSC, Club Brugge	Brussels	Full Belgium Caps	Age 19 v Middlesbrough, 2 Jan. 2010	Roberto Mancini
Greg Cunningham	(England) 1	Nottingham Forest, Bristol City, Preston North End, Galway United	Galway	(Republic of Ireland) Full Ireland Caps	Age 18 v Scunthorpe United, 24 Jan. 2010	Roberto Mancini
Abdisalam Ibrahim	(Netherlands) 1	Strømsgodset, Viking, Vålerenga	Mogadishu	Full Norway Caps	Age 18 v Scunthorpe United, 24 Jan. 2010	Roberto Mancini
Javan Vidal	(Scotland) 1	Aberdeen, Tamworth, Wrexham, Bradford (Park Avenue)	Manchester	England U20	Age 21 v West Bromwich Albion, 22 Sep. 2010	Roberto Mancini
Ben Mee	(England) 1	Burnley, Brentford	Manchester	England U21	Age 20 v West Bromwich Albion, 22 Sep. 2010	Roberto Mancini
Alex Nimely	(England) 1	Coventry City	Monrovia	England U20	Age 18 v Burnley, 3 Apr. 2010	Roberto Mancini
Chris Chantler	(Scotland) 1	Carlisle United, Kilmarnock, F.C. United, Spennymoor Town, Ossett United	Manchester	—N/a	Age 20 v Juventus, 16 Dec. 2010	Roberto Mancini
Abdul Razak	(England) 1	AFC United, IK Sirius, Örgryte	Abidjan	Full Ivory Coast Caps	Age 18 v West Bromwich Albion, 5 Feb. 2011	Roberto Mancini
Ryan McGivern	(England) 1	Bristol City, Hibernian, Port Vale, Linfield, Newry City	Newry	Full Northern Ireland Caps	Age 21 v Sunderland, 3 Apr. 2011	Roberto Mancini
Reece Wabara	(England) 2	Oldham, Doncaster	Birmingham	England U20	Age 19 v Bolton Wanderers, 22 May 2011	Roberto Mancini
Jérémy Hélan	(England) 2	Sheffield Wednesday	Paris	France U19	Age 20 v Aston Villa, 25 Sep. 2012	Roberto Mancini
Emyr Huws	(England) 2	Huddersfield Town, Ipswich Town	Llanelli	Full Wales Caps	Age 20 v Blackburn Rovers, 15 Jan. 2014	Roberto Mancini
David Faupala	(Ukraine) 1	Zorya Luhansk, Apollon Limassol	Bully-les-Mines	France U18	Age 19 v Chelsea, 21 Feb. 2016	Manuel Pellegrini

==== Active players ====
Player	Level (Note: Highest level determined from)	Current Club	Born	International Honours	Debut	Manager
Ched Evans	(England) 1	(England) Fleetwood Town	Rhyl	Full Wales Caps	Age 18 v Norwich City, 25 Sep. 2007	Sven-Göran Eriksson
John Guidetti	(England) 1	(Sweden) Rinkeby United	Stockholm	Full Sweden Caps	Age 18 v West Bromwich Albion, 22 Sep. 2010	Roberto Mancini
Karim Rekik	(Germany) 1	Unattached	Rotterdam	Full Netherlands Caps	Age 16 v Birmingham City, 21 Sep. 2011	Roberto Mancini
Luca Scapuzzi	(England) 2	(Italy) Caratese	Milan	—N/a	Age 20 v Birmingham City, 21 Sep. 2011	Roberto Mancini
Denis Suárez	(England) 1	(Spain) Alaves	Vigo	Full Spain Cap	Age 17 v Wolverhampton Wanderers, 26 Oct. 2011	Roberto Mancini
Rony Lopes	(Spain) 1	(Poland) Motor Lublin	Belém de Maria	Full Portugal Cap	Age 17 v Watford, 5 Jan. 2013	Roberto Mancini
José Ángel Pozo	(England) 1	(Poland) Pogoń Szczecin	Málaga	Spain U21	Age 18 v Sheffield Wednesday, 24 Sep. 2014	Manuel Pellegrini
Kelechi Iheanacho	(England) 1	(Turkey) Buraspor	Imo State	Full Nigeria Caps	Age 18 v Watford, 29 Aug. 2015	Manuel Pellegrini
Manu García	(England) 1	(Greece) Aris	Oviedo	Full Spain Cap	Age 17 v Sunderland, 22 Sep. 2015	Manuel Pellegrini
George Evans	(England) 2	(England) Burton Albion	Cheadle	England U20	Age 20 v Sunderland, 22 Sep. 2015	Manuel Pellegrini
Bersant Celina	(England) 1	(Saudi Arabia) Al Ettifaq	Prizren	Full Kosovo Caps	Age 19 v Norwich, 9 Jan. 2016	Manuel Pellegrini
Angeliño	(England) 1	(Spain) Deportivo de A Coruña (on loan from Roma)	Coristanco	Spain U21	Age 19 v Aston Villa, 30 Jan. 2016	Manuel Pellegrini
Cameron Humphreys	(England) 2	(England) Port Vale	Manchester	England U19	Age 17 v Aston Villa, 30 Jan. 2016	Manuel Pellegrini
Brandon Barker	(England) 2	Unattached	Manchester	England U20	Age 19 v Chelsea, 21 Feb. 2016	Manuel Pellegrini
Aleix García	(England) 1	(Germany) Bayer Leverkusen	Ulldecona	Full Spain Caps	Age 18 v Chelsea, 21 Feb. 2016	Manuel Pellegrini
Tosin Adarabioyo	(England) 1	(England) Tottenham Hotspur	Manchester	England U19	Age 18 v Chelsea, 21 Feb. 2016	Manuel Pellegrini
Pablo Maffeo	(Spain) 1	(Spain) Valencia (on loan from Olympiakos)	Sant Joan Despi	Spain U21	Age 19 v Steaua București, 24 Aug. 2016	Pep Guardiola
Brahim Díaz	(England) 1	(Spain) Real Madrid	Málaga	Full Spain Cap; Full Morocco Caps	Age 17 v Swansea, 21 Sep. 2016	Pep Guardiola
Phil Foden	(England) 1	(England) Manchester City	Stockport	Full England Caps	Age 17 v Feyenoord, 21 Nov. 2017	Pep Guardiola
Lukas Nmecha	(England) 1	(England) Leeds United	Hamburg	Full Germany Caps	Age 19 v Leicester City, 19 Dec. 2017	Pep Guardiola
Tom Dele-Bashiru	(England) 2	(Greece) Aris Thessaloniki	Manchester	Nigeria U23	Age 18 v Leicester City, 19 Dec. 2017	Pep Guardiola
Claudio Gomes	(England) 2	(Italy) Palermo	Argenteuil	France U20	Age 18 v Chelsea, 5 Aug. 2018	Pep Guardiola
Arijanet Muric	(England) 1	(Italy) Sassuolo	Zürich	Full Kosovo Caps	Age 19 v Oxford United, 25 Sep. 2018	Pep Guardiola
Adrián Bernabé	(Italy) 1	(Italy) Parma	Barcelona	Spain U23	Age 17 v Oxford United, 25 Sep. 2018	Pep Guardiola
Eric García	(England) 1	(Spain) Barcelona	Barcelona	Full Spain Caps	Age 17 v Leicester City, 18 Dec. 2018	Pep Guardiola
Ian Poveda	(England) 1	(Colombia) Inter Bogotá	London	Full Colombia Caps	Age 18 v Burton Albion, 23 Jan. 2019	Pep Guardiola
Felix Nmecha	(Germany) 1	(Germany) Borussia Dortmund	Hamburg	Full Germany Caps	Age 18 v Burton Albion, 23 Jan. 2019	Pep Guardiola
Taylor Harwood-Bellis	(England) 1	(England) Aston Villa	Stockport	Full England Cap	Age 17 v Preston North End, 24 Sep. 2019	Pep Guardiola
Tommy Doyle	(England) 1	(England) Wolverhampton Wanderers	Manchester	England U21	Age 18 v Southampton, 29 Oct. 2019	Pep Guardiola
Liam Delap	(England) 1	(England) Nottingham Forest	Winchester	England U21	Age 17 v AFC Bournemouth, 24 Sep. 2020	Pep Guardiola
Cole Palmer	(England) 1	(England) Chelsea	Manchester	Full England Caps	Age 18 v Burnley, 30 Sep. 2020	Pep Guardiola
Samuel Edozie	(England) 1	(England) Southampton	London	England U20	Age 18 v Leicester City, 7 Aug. 2021	Pep Guardiola
Ben Knight	(England) 3	(England) Cambridge United	Cambridge	England U18	Age 19 v Leicester City, 7 Aug. 2021	Pep Guardiola
CJ Egan-Riley	(England) 1	(France) Marseille	Manchester	England U21	Age 18 v Wycombe Wanderers, 21 Sep. 2021	Pep Guardiola
Luke Mbete	(England) 2	Unattached	London	England U21	Age 18 v Wycombe Wanderers, 21 Sep. 2021	Pep Guardiola
Finley Burns	(England) 2	(England) Wigan Athletic	London	England U20	Age 18 v Wycombe Wanderers, 21 Sep. 2021	Pep Guardiola
Josh Wilson-Esbrand	(France) 1	(England) Manchester City	London	England U21	Age 18 v Wycombe Wanderers, 21 Sep. 2021	Pep Guardiola
Roméo Lavia	(England) 1	(England) Chelsea	Brussels	Full Belgium Cap	Age 17 v Wycombe Wanderers, 21 Sep. 2021	Pep Guardiola
James McAtee	(England) 1	(England) Nottingham Forest	Salford	England U21	Age 18 v Wycombe Wanderers, 21 Sep. 2021	Pep Guardiola
Rico Lewis	(England) 1	(England) Manchester City	Manchester	Full England Caps	Age 17 v AFC Bournemouth, 13 Aug. 2022	Pep Guardiola
Shea Charles	(England) 1	(England) Fulham	Manchester	Full Northern Ireland Caps	Age 19 v Brentford, 28 May 2023	Pep Guardiola
Oscar Bobb	(England) 1	(England) Fulham	Oslo	Full Norway Caps	Age 20 v Fulham, 3 Sep. 2023	Pep Guardiola
Micah Hamilton	(England) 2	(England) Middlesbrough	Manchester	England U20	Age 20 v Red Star Belgrade, 13 Dec. 2023	Pep Guardiola
Mahamadou Susoho	(Scotland) 1	(Turkey) Kocaelispor	Granollers	Spain U18	Age 18 v Red Star Belgrade, 13 Dec. 2023	Pep Guardiola
Jacob Wright	(England) 2	(England) Norwich City	Manchester	England U20	Age 18 v Huddersfield, 7 Jan. 2024	Pep Guardiola
Nico O'Reilly	(England) 1	(England) Manchester City	Manchester	Full England Caps	Age 19 v Manchester United, 10 Aug. 2024	Pep Guardiola
Kaden Braithwaite	(England) 1	(England) Manchester City	Manchester	England U18	Age 16 v Watford, 24 Sep. 2024	Pep Guardiola
Jahmai Simpson-Pusey	(England) 1	(Germany) 1. FC Köln	Huddersfield	England U18	Age 18 v Tottenham Hotspur, 30 Oct. 2024	Pep Guardiola
Divine Mukasa	(England) 1	(England) West Ham United (on loan from Manchester City)	Newham	England U19	Age 18 v Huddersfield, 24 Sep 2025	Pep Guardiola
Jaden Heskey	(England) 2	(England) Sheffield Wednesday (on loan from Manchester City)	Manchester		Age 19 v Huddersfield, 24 Sep 2025	Pep Guardiola
Reigan Heskey	(Germany) 1	(Germany) 1. FC Köln	Manchester	England U18	Age 17 v Huddersfield, 24 Sep 2025	Pep Guardiola
Charlie Gray	(England) 3	(England) Wigan Athletic (on loan from Manchester City)	Manchester		Age 19 v Brentford, 17 Dec 2025	Pep Guardiola
Max Alleyne	(England) 1	(England) Burnley (on loan from Manchester City}	Bristol	England U21	Age 20 v Brighton, 7 Jan 2026	Pep Guardiola
Ryan McAidoo	(England) 1	(England) Manchester City	Harlow	England U18	Age 17 v Exeter City, 10 Jan 2026	Pep Guardiola
Stephen Mfuni	(England) 2	(England) Coventry City (on loan from Manchester City)	Wigan	England U19	Age 17 v Exeter City, 10 Jan 2026	Pep Guardiola
Floyd Samba		(England) Manchester City	Macclesfield	England U17	Age 17 v Norwich City, 17 Sep 2026	Enzo Maresca

== Honours ==
=== Elite Development Squad ===
- Premier League 2
  - Winners (4): 2020–21, 2021–22, 2022–23, 2024–25
  - League–phase winners (1): 2024–25
- Premier League International Cup
  - Winners (1): 2014–15
- The Central League
  - Winners (4): 1977–78, 1986–87, 1999–00, 2007–08
- Lancashire Senior Cup
  - Winners (6): 1920–21, 1922–23, 1927–28, 1929–30, 1952–53, 1973–74

=== Academy ===
- FA Youth Cup
  - Winners (5): 1985–86, 2007–08, 2019–20, 2023–24, 2025–26
  - Runners-Up (9): 1978–79, 1979–80, 1988–89, 2005–06, 2014–15, 2015–16, 2016–17, 2018–19, 2024–25
- U-18 Professional Development League
  - Northern Division Champions (12) 1997–98, 2007–08, 2009–10, 2013–14, 2015–16, 2016–17, 2019–20, 2020–21, 2021–22, 2022–23, 2024–25, 2025–26
  - National Champions: (4) 2015–16, 2020–21, 2021–22, 2022–23
- U-18 Premier League Cup
  - Winners (2): 2018–19, 2019–20
