= Paweł Sokół =

Polish footballer

Personal information
- Full name: Paweł Sokół
- Date of birth: 2 March 2000 (age 26)
- Place of birth: Dębica, Poland
- Height: 1.93 m (6 ft 4 in)
- Position: Goalkeeper

Team information
- Current team: Wisłoka Dębica
- Number: 1

Youth career
- Rzemieślnik Pilzno
- 2014–2016: Korona Kielce
- 2016–2018: Manchester City

Senior career*
Years	Team	Apps	(Gls)
2018–2020	Korona Kielce	9	(0)
2019	Korona Kielce II	2	(0)
2020	→ Elana Toruń (loan)	8	(0)
2020–2021	Chojniczanka Chojnice	36	(0)
2021–2023	Górnik Zabrze	0	(0)
2021–2023	Górnik Zabrze II	23	(0)
2023–2024	Sandecja Nowy Sącz	18	(0)
2024–2025	Legion Pilzno	19	(0)
2025–	Wisłoka Dębica	26	(0)

International career
2016	Poland U16	2	(0)
2017	Poland U18	2	(0)
2018	Poland U19	3	(0)
2019	Poland U20	3	(0)
- * Club domestic league appearances and goals as of 17:31, 5 June 2026 (UTC)

Paweł Sokół (born 2 March 2000) is a Polish professional footballer who plays as a goalkeeper for III liga club Wisłoka Dębica, where he also serves as a goalkeeping coach.

== Club career ==
He played for the Manchester City youth academy.

On 7 August 2020, he joined Chojniczanka Chojnice on a one-year contract.
