= Ruben Sammut =

Footballer (born 1997)

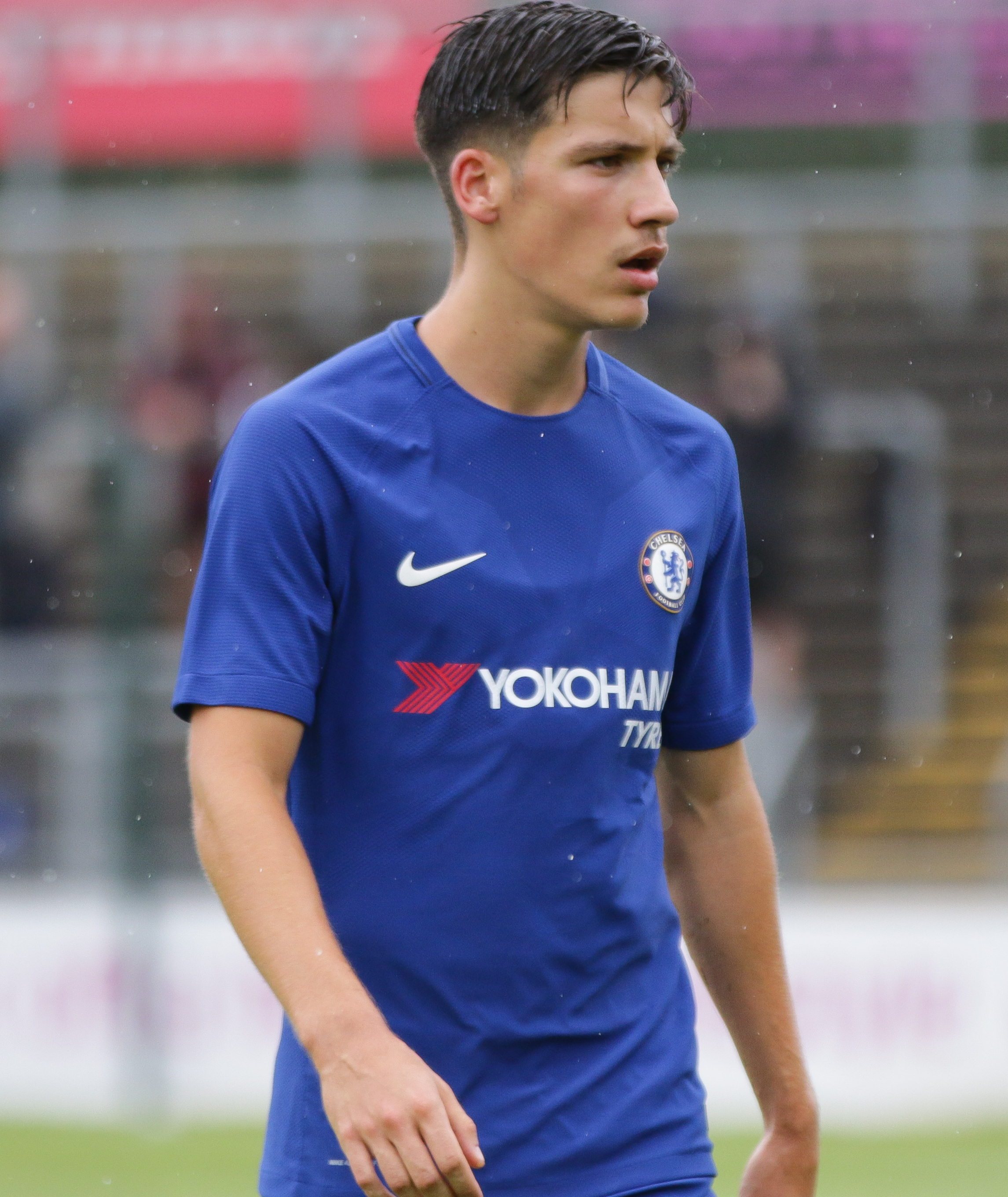
- Sammut with Chelsea in 2017

Personal information
- Full name: Ruben Alexander Michael Sammut
- Date of birth: 26 September 1997 (age 29)
- Place of birth: Maidstone, England
- Position: Midfielder

Youth career
- 2004–2018: Chelsea

Senior career*
Years	Team	Apps	(Gls)
2018–2019	Chelsea	0	(0)
2018–2019	→ Falkirk (loan)	12	(0)
2019–2020	Sunderland	0	(0)
2020–2021	Dulwich Hamlet	5	(0)
Total		17	(0)

International career
2013	Scotland U16	4	(0)
2015–2016	Scotland U19	9	(1)
2017	Scotland U20	4	(0)
2016	Scotland U21	3	(0)
Medal record
Scotland
Toulon Tournament
Bronze medal – third place	2017 Toulon	U–20 Competition
- * Club domestic league appearances and goals

Ruben Alexander Michael Sammut (born 26 September 1997) is a former professional footballer who played as a midfielder. He works at Chelsea as a senior scout, having previously worked at Charlton Athletic.

He came through the academy at Chelsea from u8's to u21's and represented Scotland up to the U21 level.

== Club career ==
Born in Maidstone, England, Sammut joined the Chelsea Academy in 2004 and went on to make his U18 debut in March 2013. Following this, he quickly became a regular in Chelsea's academy sides, featuring in both their UEFA Youth League and FA Youth Cup successes in 2015 and 2016. Despite rumours suggesting Sammut was to leave the club following the conclusion of the 2017–18 campaign, he signed a new one-year deal in June.

On 19 June 2018, following his contract extension, Sammut agreed to join Scottish Championship club Falkirk on a season-long loan. On 14 July 2018, he made his professional debut during Falkirk's Scottish League Cup defeat against Montrose, featuring for the full 90 minutes in the 1–0 loss.

Sammut signed for League One club Sunderland in July 2019 following a trial. He made no first-team appearances, and was released at the end of the season.

Sammut moved on to National League South club Dulwich Hamlet. Whilst at Dulwich, Sammut returned to Chelsea, to take on a role as an academy scout and analysis intern. Sammut featured just eight times in all competitions, before leaving the club following a disrupted 2020–21 campaign due to the COVID-19 pandemic.

After leaving Dulwich Hamlet, Sammut took up a role at Charlton Athletic as the club's first team recruitment coordinator. After 2 years in the role he moved on to become a senior scout at childhood club Chelsea.

== International career ==
Sammut is eligible to represent England and Malta at international level in addition to Scotland. He has featured for Scotland from the U16 to U21 levels.

Selected for the Scotland under-20 squad in the 2017 Toulon Tournament. The team went to claim the bronze medal. It was the nation's first ever medal at the competition.

== Career statistics ==
As of match played 28 December 2020

Appearances and goals by club, season and competition
Club	Season	League			National Cup		League Cup		Other		Total	
Club	Season	Division	Apps	Goals	Apps	Goals	Apps	Goals	Apps	Goals	Apps	Goals
Chelsea	2018–19	Premier League	0	0	0	0	0	0	0	0	0	0
Falkirk (loan)	2018–19	Scottish Championship	12	0	1	0	3	0	0	0	16	0
Sunderland	2019–20	League One	0	0	0	0	0	0	0	0	0	0
Dulwich Hamlet	2020–21	National League South	5	0	2	0	—		1 (Note: Appearance in FA Trophy)	0	8	0
Career total			17	0	3	0	3	0	1	0	24	0

== Honours ==
Chelsea

- FA Youth Cup: 2014–15, 2015–16
- UEFA Youth League: 2014–15, 2015–16
