= Joe Edwards (football manager) =

English football manager

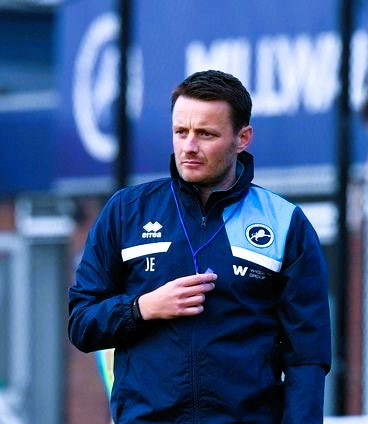

Personal information
- Date of birth: 26 September 1986 (age 40)
- Place of birth: London, England

Team information
- Current team: Coventry City (assistant)

Youth career
- Years: Team
- 1994–2003: Chelsea
- 2003–2004: Wimbledon

Managerial career
- 2014–2016: Chelsea U18
- 2017–2019: Chelsea U23
- 2019–2022: Chelsea (assistant)
- 2022–2023: Everton (assistant)
- 2023: Chelsea (interim assistant)
- 2023: England U20 (caretaker)
- 2023–2024: Millwall
- 2024–: Coventry City (assistant)

Joe Edwards (born 26 September 1986) is an English professional football manager who is assistant coach of Premier League club Coventry City. A former Chelsea youth player, he has also had coaching positions with Chelsea, Everton and England U20s.

== Playing career ==
Edwards is a product of Chelsea's youth academy since the age of eight, and worked his way up their youth categories. He was released by the club at the age of 16.

== Coaching career ==
=== Chelsea ===
Shortly after being released, Edwards was approached by Neil Bath to join Chelsea's staff in 2004 at the age of 17 and started working on his coaching badges. He initially trained the U8s, and from 2004 to 2014 coached various different youth levels for the club, which also included assisting the likes of Brendan Rodgers and Paul Clement. In 2014 he was appointed the manager of the Chelsea U18s and helped them win two consecutive FA Youth Cups - having also won two as U18 assistant - and back-to-back U18 Premier League South titles. In 2016, he was appointed as loan player manager, visiting loan clubs to track the development of different Chelsea players, which also exposed him to a variety of management and coaching styles. On 6 May 2017, he returned to manage the Chelsea U19s and U23s. In 2017, he was also part of the England U20s backroom staff that helped them win the 2017 Toulon Tournament. In June 2017, he earned his pro license. The following season in 2018, he took the Chelsea U23s to the semifinals of the EFL Trophy, which still remains the highest placement by a reserve team in the competition. Edwards also guided the U23s to consecutive UEFA Youth League finals, which were won by Barcelona in 2018 and FC Porto in 2019.

For the 2019–20 season, Edwards was appointed as assistant manager for the first time under Frank Lampard, where, despite a transfer ban, the team achieved a fourth place finish comprising a group of young, homegrown players including the likes of Mason Mount, Tammy Abraham, Fikayo Tomori and Reece James, all of who Edwards had worked closely with in the Chelsea youth ranks. He remained assistant at Chelsea after Lampard was sacked and Thomas Tuchel was appointed, and was part of the backroom staff as they won the 2020–21 UEFA Champions League and 2021 UEFA Super Cup.

=== Everton, Chelsea Return, England U20s ===
In January 2022, Edwards left Chelsea after a 27-year association to be reunited with Lampard at Everton as assistant manager. They arrived with the club four points above the relegation zone and secured survival in the penultimate league match after coming from two goals down at half-time to secure a 3–2 win against Crystal Palace. Lampard and Edwards were relieved of their duties at Everton in January, 2023.

In April 2023, he once more returned to Chelsea as assistant under Lampard as he filled in as interim manager.

In August 2023, he was appointed as the interim manager for the England U20s.

=== Millwall ===
On 6 November 2023, Edwards was appointed as head coach of Championship club Millwall. In his debut game, he led Millwall to a 4–0 win at Sheffield Wednesday, the Lions' largest away win in the second tier since 2017. Over the Christmas period, the team secured 10 points in 10 days including three straight wins for the first time in over a year and four consecutive clean sheets for the first time since March 2022 as the Lions moved closer to the play-off positions than the relegation spaces. They were unable to sustain that level of results, however, and after a run of seven games without a win Edwards was sacked by Millwall on 21 February 2024, following a 2–0 home defeat by Sheffield Wednesday.

== Managerial statistics ==
As of 17 February 2024

Managerial record by team and tenure
Team	From	To	Record				
Team	From	To	P	W	D	L	Win %
Millwall	6 November 2023	21 February 2024	19	4	4	11	21.05
Total			19	4	4	11	21.05

== Honours ==
=== Manager ===
Chelsea U18

- FA Youth Cup: Winner - 2014–15, 2015–16

Chelsea U23

- UEFA Youth League: Finalist - 2017-18, 2018–19

=== Coach ===
England U17

- Toulon tournament: Winner - 2017

Chelsea

- UEFA Champions League: Winner - 2020-21
- UEFA Super Cup: Winner - 2021
