= Tariq Uwakwe =

English footballer (born 1999)

Personal information
- Full name: Tariq Onyedika Uwakwe
- Date of birth: 19 November 1999 (age 26)
- Place of birth: Islington, England
- Height: 6 ft 0 in (1.83 m)
- Positions: Defender; midfielder

Team information
- Current team: Maidstone United

Youth career
- 2007–2020: Chelsea

Senior career*
Years	Team	Apps	(Gls)
2020–2022	Chelsea	0	(0)
2020–2021	→ Accrington Stanley (loan)	15	(1)
2022–2023	Crewe Alexandra	44	(1)
2023–2025	Swindon Town	8	(0)
2024	→ Maidenhead United (loan)	1	(0)
2025	→ Aldershot Town (loan)	3	(0)
2026–	Maidstone United	0	(0)

International career
2017	England U19	2	(0)
2017	England U20	3	(0)
- * Club domestic league appearances and goals as of 13:02, 5 September 2026 (UTC)

Tariq Onyedika Uwakwe (born 19 November 1999) is an English professional footballer who plays as a defender or midfielder for National League South club Maidstone United.

== Early life ==
Uwakwe was born in Islington, London, and is of Nigerian descent.

== Club career ==
Uwakwe began his career at Chelsea, after joining at the age of 8, and signed on loan for Accrington Stanley in September 2020. He made his Accrington debut on 8 September 2020, in an EFL Trophy tie against Leeds United U21s, and scored a hat-trick in the process. He made his league debut four days later against Peterborough United, scoring a goal.

On 28 January 2022, Uwakwe joined EFL League One side Crewe Alexandra on an 18-month contract, and made his debut in Crewe's 1–0 league defeat at Gillingham on 1 February 2022. On his fifth appearance for Crewe, against Oxford United, he suffered a knee injury, ruling him out for several weeks. He scored his first (and only) Crewe goal in a 2-2 draw at Harrogate Town on 18 February 2023. At the end of the season, he was offered a new contract by the club, but on 30 June 2023, it was announced he was leaving Crewe by mutual consent.

=== Swindon Town ===
On 4 August 2023 he signed for Swindon Town.

In September 2024, he joined National League side Maidenhead United on a short-term loan deal. On 3 March 2025, he returned to the National League, joining Aldershot Town on loan for the remainder of the season.

On 9 May 2025, Swindon announced the player would be leaving in June when his contract expired.

=== Maidstone United ===
On 4 September 2026, Uwakwe joined National League South club Maidstone United.

== International career ==
Uwakwe has represented England at under-18, under-19 and under-20 youth levels.

== Career statistics ==
As of end of 2024–25 season

Appearances and goals by club, season and competition
Club	Season	League			FA Cup		League Cup		Other		Total	
Club	Season	Division	Apps	Goals	Apps	Goals	Apps	Goals	Apps	Goals	Apps	Goals
Chelsea U23	2018–19	—			—		—		2 (Note: Appearance(s) in EFL Trophy)	0	2	0
Chelsea U23	2019–20	—			—		—		1	0	1	0
Chelsea U23	2021–22	—			—		—		1	1	1	1
Chelsea U23	Total		—		—		—		4	1	4	1
Chelsea	2020–21	Premier League	0	0	0	0	0	0	0	0	0	0
Accrington Stanley (loan)	2020–21	League One	15	1	1	0	0	0	5	3	21	4
Crewe Alexandra	2021–22	League One	8	0	0	0	0	0	0	0	8	0
Crewe Alexandra	2022–23	League Two	36	1	2	0	1	0	1	0	40	1
Crewe Alexandra	Total		44	1	2	0	1	0	1	0	48	1
Swindon Town	2023–24	League Two	8	0	0	0	1	0	2	1	11	1
Maidenhead United (loan)	2024–25	National League	1	0	0	0	0	0	1 (Note: Appearance in National League Cup)	0	2	0
Aldershot Town (loan)	2024–25	National League	3	0	0	0	—		0	0	3	0
Career total			71	2	3	0	1	0	13	5	86	7
