= Adam Nditi =

Tanzanian footballer (born 1994)

Personal information
- Full name: Adam Eric Richard Nditi
- Date of birth: 18 September 1994 (age 32)
- Place of birth: Zanzibar, Tanzania
- Positions: Left-back; midfielder

Youth career
- 2008: Down Grange FC
- 2008–2014: Chelsea
- 2014–2015: Fleetwood Town

Senior career*
Years	Team	Apps	(Gls)
2015	Farnborough	3	(0)
2015	Slough Town	1	(0)
2015–2016	Guildford City	13	(8)
2016	Badshot Lea	6	(3)
2016	Guildford City	2	(0)
2016	Woodley United	6	(1)
2017	Fleet Town	1	(0)
2019	Eversley & California	2	(0)
2019–2020	Cove	3	(1)
Total		37	(13)
- * Club domestic league appearances and goals

Adam Eric Richard Nditi (born 18 September 1994) is a Tanzanian former footballer.

== Club career ==
=== Early career ===
Nditi was born in Zanzibar, Tanzania to Mzee Erick Nditi, a former Zanzibar international footballer. His father moved to England in 1995, and Nditi moved to Basingstoke in 2008, scoring eight goals on his debut for local youth team Down Grange FC, before going on to score another four in his next three games. This form at local level prompted professional side Chelsea to sign him in 2008. Initially a forward at Chelsea, he transitioned to left-back, citing Ashley Cole as a player he looked up to.

He signed a professional contract with Chelsea in July 2012, being assigned the number 47 shirt. He was offered a contract with The Blues in 2014, but stated "I want to be a professional and play first-team football. It’s very hard to do that at Chelsea, so there’s a chance that I might move on this summer." He left the club in July 2014, going on to trial in the Netherlands, as well as an extended trial with Basingstoke Town, before joining Fleetwood Town, who were then in League One.

=== Career in non-league ===
He only stayed with Fleetwood Town for a year, before joining Farnborough in the Isthmian League, playing five games in all competitions before leaving only four months after signing. He had a very brief spell with Slough Town, playing in a 2–1 home win against Bideford on 3 October 2015. Following his departure from Slough Town, he played for Guildford City between October 2015 and March 2016, scoring eight goals in sixteen appearances in all competitions, across two spells.

He joined Badshot Lea in February 2016. Later in the same year, he was at Woodley United, where he made eight appearances in all competitions, scoring twice. He played for Fleet Town, where he played three games in all competitions in the 2017–18 season. By September 2018, he was playing in the Basingstoke and District Football League for Chineham.

== International career ==
Nditi raised a dispute against the Tanzania Football Federation, accusing them of failing to call him up to the Tanzania senior squad, despite his eligibility.

== Personal life ==
Nditi has three younger half-brothers; Roberto (born 2000), and twins Zion and Paulo (born 2005). All three started their footballing careers in the Reading academy, with Roberto going on to forge a career in the lower divisions of Scotland.

== Career statistics ==
=== Club ===
Appearances and goals by club, season and competition
Club	Season	League			Cup		Other		Total	
Club	Season	Division	Apps	Goals	Apps	Goals	Apps	Goals	Apps	Goals
Farnborough	2015–16	Isthmian League	3	0	2 (Note: Appearances in FA Cup qualification)	0	0	0	5	0
Slough Town	2015–16	Southern League	1	0	0	0	0	0	1	0
Guildford City	2015–16	Combined Counties Football League; Premier Division	13	8	0	0	0	0	13	8
Badshot Lea	2015–16	Combined Counties Football League; Premier Division	3	3	0	0	0	0	3	3
Badshot Lea	2016–17	Combined Counties Football League; Premier Division	3	0	0	0	0	0	3	0
Badshot Lea	Total		6	3	0	0	0	0	6	3
Guildford City	2016–17	Combined Counties Football League; Premier Division	2	0	0	0	0	0	2	0
Woodley United	2016–17	Hellenic Football League; Division One East	6	1	0	0	2 (Note: One appearance in FA Vase qualification, one appearance and one goal in the Berks & Bucks Intermediate Cup)	1	8	2
Fleet Town	2017–18	Isthmian League	1	0	2	0	0	0	3	0
Eversley & California	2019–20	Combined Counties Football League; Division One	2	0	0	0	0	0	2	0
Cove	2019–20	Combined Counties Football League; Division One	3	1	0	0	0	0	3	1
Career total			37	13	4	0	2	1	43	14
