= 2021–22 Aston Villa F.C. season =

English football club season

Aston Villa
2021–22 season
- Chairman: Nassef Sawiris
- Head coach: Dean Smith (until 7 November); Steven Gerrard (from 11 November)
- Stadium: Villa Park
- Premier League: 14th
- FA Cup: Third round
- EFL Cup: Third round
- Top goalscorer: League: Ollie Watkins (11); All: Ollie Watkins (11)
- Highest home attendance: 42,045 (vs Brentford, 28 August 2021)
- Lowest home attendance: 40,290 (vs Norwich City, 30 April 2022)
- Average home league attendance: 41,681
- Biggest win: 4–0 (vs Southampton, 5 March 2022)
- Biggest defeat: 0–4 (vs Tottenham Hotspur, 9 April 2022)
Home colours	Away colours	Third colours

The 2021–22 season was Aston Villa's 27th season in the Premier League and their 147th season in English football. The 2021–22 Premier League season was Villa's third consecutive, and their 108th season at the top flight of English football. Along with the league, the club also competed in the FA Cup, being eliminated by Chelsea in the third round, and the EFL Cup, where they were eliminated by Manchester United in the third round.

On 5 August, captain Jack Grealish left the club and signed for Manchester City for £100 million, a record fee between two British clubs. On 7 November, manager Dean Smith was sacked and replaced by Steven Gerrard four days later. There were debut appearances for Leon Bailey, Emiliano Buendía, Lucas Digne, Danny Ings, Calum Chambers, Philippe Coutinho, Robin Olsen, Tim Iroegbunam, Caleb Chukwuemeka, and Aaron Ramsey.

The season was the first since 2012–13 without Jack Grealish and the first full season since 2015–16 without Henri Lansbury, who departed to Bristol City during the 2020–21 season, and Neil Taylor, who departed upon the expiry of his contract before joining Middlesbrough.

The season was also notable for Ashley Young's return from Inter Milan for a second stint at Villa, the first time he played in Birmingham after 2010-11.

== Players ==
N	Pos.	Nat.	Name	Age	Since	App	Goals	Ends	Transfer fee	Previous Club	Notes
1	GK	(Argentina)	Emiliano Martínez	29	2020	76	0	2027	£17,000,000	(England) Arsenal	
2	DF	(Poland)	Matty Cash	24	2020	68	4	2027	£14,000,000	(England) Nottingham Forest	
3	DF	(England)	Matt Targett	26	2019	89	3	2025	£11,500,000	(England) Southampton	On loan at Newcastle United
4	DF	(England)	Ezri Konsa	24	2019	98	6	2026	£12,000,000	(England) Brentford	
5	DF	(England)	Tyrone Mings	29	2019	128	7	2024	£20,000,000	(England) Bournemouth	Captain
6	MF	(Brazil)	Douglas Luiz	24	2019	109	5	2023	£15,000,000	(England) Manchester City	
7	MF	(Scotland)	John McGinn	27	2018	147	16	2025	£3,500,000	(Scotland) Hibernian	
8	MF	(France)	Morgan Sanson	27	2021 (Winter)	21	0	2025	£14,000,000	(France) Marseille	
9	FW	(Brazil)	Wesley	25	2019	26	6	2024	£22,000,000	(Belgium) Club Brugge	On loan at Internacional
10	MF	(Argentina)	Emiliano Buendía	25	2021	37	4	2026	£33,000,000	(England) Norwich City	Current record signing
11	FW	(England)	Ollie Watkins	26	2020	76	27	2025	£28,000,000	(England) Brentford	
12	GK	(England)	Jed Steer	29	2013	36	0	2023	£400,000	(England) Norwich City	On loan at Luton Town
14	MF	(Republic of Ireland)	Conor Hourihane	31	2017 (Winter)	151	29	2022	£3,200,000	(England) Barnsley	On loan at Sheffield United
15	FW	(Burkina Faso)	Bertrand Traoré	26	2020	47	8	2024	£17,000,000	(France) Olympique Lyonnais	
16	DF	(England)	Calum Chambers	27	2022 (Winter)	11	1	2026	Free	(England) Arsenal	
17	MF	(Egypt)	Trézéguet	27	2019	64	9	2023	£8,800,000	(Turkey) Kasımpaşa	On loan at İstanbul Başakşehir
18	DF	(England)	Ashley Young	36	2021	215	38	2022	Free	(Italy) Inter Milan	
19	MF	(Zimbabwe)	Marvelous Nakamba	28	2019	67	0	2024	£10,200,000	(Belgium) Club Brugge	
20	FW	(England)	Danny Ings	29	2021	31	7	2024	£25,000,000	(England) Southampton	
21	MF	(Netherlands)	Anwar El Ghazi	27	2019	119	25	2023	£8,100,000	(France) Lille	On loan at Everton
23	MF	(Brazil)	Philippe Coutinho	30	2022 (Winter)	19	5	2022	6-Month Loan	(Spain) Barcelona	
24	DF	(France)	Frédéric Guilbert	27	2019 (Winter)	32	3	2023	£4,500,000	(France) Caen	On loan at Strasbourg
25	GK	(Sweden)	Robin Olsen	32	2022 (Winter)	1	0	2022	6-Month Loan	(Italy) Roma	
27	DF	(France)	Lucas Digne	28	2022 (Winter)	16	0	2026	£25,000,000	(England) Everton	
28	GK	(Croatia)	Lovre Kalinić	32	2019 (Winter)	8	0	2023	£5,400,000	(Belgium) Gent	On loan at Hajduk Split
29	DF	(England)	Kaine Kesler Hayden	19	2018	1	0	2026	Academy	Academy	On loan at MK Dons
30	DF	(England)	Kortney Hause	26	2019	55	4	2025	£3,000,000	(England) Wolverhampton Wanderers	
31	FW	(Jamaica)	Leon Bailey	24	2021	18	1	2025	£30,000,000	(Germany) Bayer Leverkusen	
32	MF	(England)	Jaden Philogene	20	2019	9	2	2025	Academy	Academy	On loan at Stoke City
33	MF	(England)	Carney Chukwuemeka	18	2019	19	0	2023	Free	(England) Northampton Town	
34	MF	(Republic of Ireland)	Tyreik Wright	20	2018	5	0	2024	Academy	Academy	On loan at Colchester United
35	FW	(England)	Cameron Archer	20	2007	13	11	2025	Academy	Academy	On loan at Preston North End
36	MF	(Netherlands)	Lamare Bogarde	18	2020	5	0	2023	Free	(Netherlands) Feyenoord	
37	DF	(England)	Mungo Bridge	21	2019	3	0	2024	Academy	Academy	
38	GK	(Finland)	Viljami Sinisalo	20	2018	2	0	2024	Free	(Finland) Espoo	
39	FW	(England)	Keinan Davis	24	2015	87	7	2024	Academy	Academy	On loan at Nottingham Forest
40	MF	(England)	Aaron Ramsey	19	2007	4	1	2023	Academy	Academy	On loan at Cheltenham Town
41	MF	(England)	Jacob Ramsey	21	2007	62	6	2027	Academy	Academy	
42	MF	(England)	Arjan Raikhy	19	2019	2	0	2024	Academy	Academy	On loan at Grimsby Town
43	FW	(England)	Brad Young	19	2018	3	0	2024	Academy	Academy	
45	MF	(England)	Ben Chrisene	18	2020	3	0	2026	£450,000	(England) Exeter City	
46	FW	(England)	Caleb Chukwuemeka	20	2021	4	0	2024	£300,000	(England) Northampton Town	On loan at Livingston
47	MF	(England)	Tim Iroegbunam	18	2021	7	0	2027	Free	(England) West Bromwich Albion	
49	MF	(England)	Hayden Lindley	19	2019	6	0	2024	Academy	Academy	
50	DF	(Netherlands)	Sil Swinkels	18	2020	5	0	2025	Free	(Netherlands) Vitesse Arnhem	
59	DF	(England)	Josh Feeney	17	2021	2	0	2024	?	(England) Fleetwood Town	
68	MF	(England)	Edward Rowe	19	2019	1	0	?	Academy	Academy	
	GK	(Hungary)	Ákos Onódi	20	2018	3	0	2024	Academy	Academy	On loan at Bromsgrove Sporting
	DF	(England)	Dominic Revan	21	2013	6	0	?	Academy	Academy	
	MF	(Bermuda)	Ajani Burchall	17	2021	0	0	2025	£125,000	(England) Bournemouth	
	FW	(United States)	Indiana Vassilev	21	2018	8	1	2022	Academy	Academy	On loan at Inter Miami
	FW	(England)	Louie Barry	19	2019 (Winter)	2	1	2024	£885,000	(Spain) Barcelona	On loan at Swindon Town
	MF	(England)	Finn Azaz	21	2021	0	0	2024	Free	(England) West Bromwich Albion	On loan at Newport County
	DF	(England)	Sebastian Revan	18	2013	3	0	?	Academy	Academy	On loan at Hereford
	MF	(England)	Declan Frith	20	2021	0	0	2024	Free	(England) Chelsea	
	DF	(Scotland)	Kerr Smith	17	2022 (Winter)	0	0	2026	£2,000,000	(Scotland) Dundee United	

== Friendlies ==
On 2 July 2021, Aston Villa announced their planned pre-season friendlies for the upcoming season. A fifth friendly against Bristol City was later added on July 9. A behind-closed-doors friendly against Crewe Alexandra was organised for 31 July, as a replacement for the cancelled Nottingham Forest match. On 6 August, a friendly against Serie A side Salernitana was organised to replace the cancelled Sevilla match.

=== July ===
21 July 2021 Friendly	Walsall	0–4	Aston Villa	Walsall
19:30 BST		Report	Watkins 27', 38'; Philogene 51'; A. Ramsey 58'	Stadium: Banks's Stadium; Attendance: 6,562; Referee: Steve Martin

24 July 2021 Friendly	Stoke City	2–0	Aston Villa	Stoke-on-Trent
15:00 BST	Fletcher 3'; Vrančić 49'; Powell (yellow card) 69'	Report	Wesley (red card) 69'	Stadium: Bet365 Stadium; Referee: Leigh Doughty

28 July 2021 Friendly	Aston Villa	Cancelled	Nottingham Forest	Bodymoor Heath
13:00 BST				Stadium: Bodymoor Heath Training Ground
Note: Friendly was cancelled as a precaution after Nottingham Forest recorded some positive COVID-19 test results.

31 July 2021 Friendly	Aston Villa	1–0	Crewe Alexandra	Bodymoor Heath
12:00 BST	Barry	Report		Stadium: Bodymoor Heath Training Ground

31 July 2021 Friendly	Bristol City	0–3	Aston Villa	Bristol
13:00 BST		Report	Philogene 6'; Konsa 44'; Watkins 60'	Stadium: Ashton Gate Stadium; Attendance: 8,589; Referee: Kevin Friend

=== August ===
7 August 2021 Friendly	Aston Villa	Cancelled	Sevilla	Aston, Birmingham
15:00 BST				Stadium: Villa Park
Note: Sevilla announced that they would not be travelling to England due to issues related to COVID-19.

8 August 2021 Friendly	Aston Villa	3–1	Salernitana	Aston, Birmingham
14:00 BST	Ings 34'; El Ghazi 43' (pen.); Young 71'	Report	Obi 20'	Stadium: Villa Park; Attendance: 0 Referee: Craig Pawson

15 August 2021 Friendly	Liverpool	4–1	Aston Villa	Liverpool
15:00 BST	Origi; Williams; Jones; Gordon	Report	Traoré	Stadium: Anfield; Attendance: 0

=== February ===
1 February 2022 Friendly	Aston Villa	2–1	Brentford	Aston, Birmingham
13:00 GMT	Watkins 56'; Mings 72'	Report	Dasilva 43'	Stadium: Villa Park; Attendance: 0

5 February 2022 Friendly	Aston Villa	3–1	Molde	Aston, Birmingham
13:00 GMT	Ramsey 5'; McGinn 11'; Watkins 23'	Report	Haugen 54'	Stadium: Villa Park; Attendance: 0

=== April ===
15 April 2022 Friendly	Brentford	1–5	Aston Villa	Brentford, London
13:00 BST				Stadium: Brentford Community Stadium

== Competitions ==
=== Overview ===
Competition	First match	Last match	Starting round	Final position	Record							
Competition	First match	Last match	Starting round	Final position	Pld	W	D	L	GF	GA	GD	Win %
Premier League	14 August 2021	22 May 2022	Matchday 1	14th	38	13	6	19	52	54	−2	34.21
FA Cup	10 January 2022		Third round	Third round	1	0	0	1	0	1	−1	0.00
EFL Cup	24 August 2021	22 September 2021	Second round	Third round	2	1	1	0	7	1	+6	50.00
Total					41	14	7	20	59	56	+3	34.15

Source: Soccerway

=== Premier League ===
==== League table ====
Pos	Team	Pld	W	D	L	GF	GA	GD	Pts
12	Crystal Palace	38	11	15	12	50	46	+4	48
13	Brentford	38	13	7	18	48	56	−8	46
14	Aston Villa	38	13	6	19	52	54	−2	45
15	Southampton	38	9	13	16	43	67	−24	40
16	Everton	38	11	6	21	43	66	−23	39

Source: Premier League
Rules for classification: 1) Points; 2) Goal difference; 3) Goals scored; 4) If the champions, relegated teams or qualified teams for UEFA competitions cannot be determined by rules 1 to 3, rules 4.1 to 4.3 are applied – 4.1) Points gained in head-to-head record between such teams; 4.2) Away goals scored in head-to-head record between such teams; 4.3) Play-offs

==== Results summary ====
Overall								Home						Away					
Pld	W	D	L	GF	GA	GD	Pts	W	D	L	GF	GA	GD	W	D	L	GF	GA	GD
38	13	6	19	52	54	−2	45	6	5	8	28	25	+3	7	1	11	24	29	−5

==== Results by matchday ====
Matchday	1	2	3	4	5	6	7	8	9	10	11	12	13	14	15	16	17	18	19	20	21	22	23	24	25	26	27	28	29	30	31	32	33	34	35	36	37	38
Ground	A	H	H	A	H	A	A	H	A	H	A	H	A	H	H	A	A	H	A	H	A	H	A	H	A	H	A	A	H	A	H	A	H	A	H	H	H	A
Result	L	W	D	L	W	W	L	L	L	L	L	W	W	L	W	L	W	L	L	D	W	D	L	L	W	W	W	L	L	L	L	D	W	W	L	D	D	L
Position	11	10	11	12	10	8	10	13	13	15	16	15	13	13	10	13	10	11	14	13	11	11	12	12	12	11	9	9	9	11	12	15	13	11	11	14	14	14

Source: Statto.com
A = Away; H = Home; W = Win; D = Draw; L = Loss

==== Matches ====
The 2021–22 season fixtures were released on 16 June 2021.

==== August ====
14 August 2021 1	Watford	3–2	Aston Villa	Watford
15:00 BST	Dennis 10'; Kucka (yellow card) 23'; Sarr 42'; Sema (yellow card) 55'; Hernández 67'; Etebo (yellow card) 86'	Report	Mings (yellow card) 54'; McGinn 70'; Ings 90+7' (pen.)	Stadium: Vicarage Road; Attendance: 20,051 (2,292 away); Referee: Mike Dean

21 August 2021 2	Aston Villa	2–0	Newcastle United	Aston, Birmingham
15:00 BST	Douglas Luiz (yellow card) 45+1'; Ings 45+3'; El Ghazi 62' (pen.); Martínez (yellow card) 75'; Buendía (yellow card) 85'	Report	Wilson (yellow card) 41'; Hayden (yellow card) 45'; Murphy (yellow card) 57'; Schär (yellow card) 84'	Stadium: Villa Park; Attendance: 41,964 (2,950 away); Referee: David Coote

28 August 2021 3	Aston Villa	1–1	Brentford	Aston, Birmingham
15:00 BST	Buendía 13'; El Ghazi (yellow card) 50'; Cash (yellow card) 61'; Ings (yellow card) 72'	Report	Toney 7', (yellow card) 52'; Nørgaard (yellow card) 60'; Janelt (yellow card) 75'	Stadium: Villa Park; Attendance: 42,045 (2,742 away); Referee: Peter Bankes

==== September ====
11 September 2021 4	Chelsea	3–0	Aston Villa	Fulham, London
17:30 BST	Lukaku 15', 90+3'; Kovačić 49'; Alonso (yellow card) 61'	Report	Ramsey (yellow card) 8'; Mings (yellow card) 28'; McGinn (yellow card) 90'; Targett (yellow card) 90'	Stadium: Stamford Bridge; Attendance: 39,969 (2,986 away); Referee: Stuart Attwell
Note: Live on Sky Sports

18 September 2021 5	Aston Villa	3–0	Everton	Aston, Birmingham
17:30 BST	Cash 66'; Digne 69' (o.g.); Bailey 75', (yellow card) 76'	Report	Godfrey (yellow card) 72'	Stadium: Villa Park; Attendance: 41,888 (2,952 away); Referee: Craig Pawson
Note: Live on Sky Sports

25 September 2021 6	Manchester United	0–1	Aston Villa	Greater Manchester
12:30 BST	Shaw (yellow card) 29'; Fred (yellow card) 77'; Fernandes (penalty missed) 90+3'	Report	McGinn (yellow card) 66'; Hause 88'; Cash (yellow card) 90'	Stadium: Old Trafford; Attendance: 72,922 (3,048 away); Referee: Mike Dean

==== October ====
3 October 2021 7	Tottenham Hotspur	2–1	Aston Villa	Tottenham, London
14:00 BST	Højbjerg 27'; Skipp (yellow card) 36'; Romero (yellow card) 68'; Targett 71' (o.g.)	Report	Ramsey (yellow card) 31'; Watkins 67'	Stadium: Tottenham Hotspur Stadium; Attendance: 53,076 (3,038 away); Referee: Chris Kavanagh

16 October 2021 8	Aston Villa	2–3	Wolverhampton Wanderers	Aston, Birmingham
15:00 BST	Ings 48'; Mings (yellow card) 61'; McGinn 68'; Watkins (yellow card) 81'	Report	Neves (yellow card) 52', (goal) 90+5'; Saïss 80'; Coady 85'; Dendoncker (yellow card) 88'	Stadium: Villa Park; Attendance: 41,951 (3,012 away); Referee: Michael Oliver

22 October 2021 9	Arsenal	3–1	Aston Villa	Holloway, London
20:00 BST	Partey 23'; Sambi Lokonga (yellow card) 45+1'; Aubameyang (penalty missed) 45+5', 45+6', (yellow card) 66'; Smith Rowe 56'	Report	Watkins (yellow card) 2'; Mings (yellow card) 27'; McGinn (yellow card) 32'; Targett (yellow card) 60'; Ramsey 82'; Douglas Luiz (yellow card) 84'	Stadium: Emirates Stadium; Attendance: 59,496 (3,003 away); Referee: Craig Pawson
Note: Live on Sky Sports

31 October 2021 10	Aston Villa	1–4	West Ham United	Aston, Birmingham
16:30 BST	Watkins 34'; Konsa (red card) 50'; McGinn (yellow card) 79'	Report	Johnson 7'; Rice 38'; Fornals (yellow card) 79', (goal) 80'; Bowen (yellow card) 79', (goal) 84'	Stadium: Villa Park; Attendance: 41,874 (3,012 away); Referee: Chris Kavanagh
Note: Live on Sky Sports

==== November ====
5 November 2021 11	Southampton	1–0	Aston Villa	Southampton
20:00 GMT	Armstrong 3'; Romeu (yellow card) 62'; Salisu (yellow card) 90+1'	Report	El Ghazi (yellow card) 11'; Tuanzebe (yellow card) 65'	Stadium: St Mary's Stadium; Attendance: 30,178 (3,344 away); Referee: Andrew Madley
Note: Live on Sky Sports

20 November 2021 12	Aston Villa	2–0	Brighton & Hove Albion	Aston, Birmingham
15:00 GMT	Nakamba (yellow card) 59'; Watkins 84'; Mings 89'; Konsa (yellow card) 90+3'; Cash (yellow card) 90+4'	Report	Cucurella (yellow card) 49'; Webster (yellow card) 67'; Mac Allister (yellow card) 90+3'	Stadium: Villa Park; Attendance: 41,925 (3,012 away); Referee: Anthony Taylor

27 November 2021 13	Crystal Palace	1–2	Aston Villa	Selhurst, London
15:00 GMT	Zaha (yellow card) 28'; Ward (yellow card) 44'; Milivojević (yellow card) 56'; Guéhi 90+5'	Report	Targett 15'; Cash (yellow card) 29'; Nakamba (yellow card) 54'; Douglas Luiz (yellow card) 74'; McGinn 86'	Stadium: Selhurst Park; Attendance: 25,203 (2,865 away); Referee: Michael Salisbury

==== December ====
1 December 2021 14	Aston Villa	1–2	Manchester City	Aston, Birmingham
20:15 GMT	Watkins 47'	Report	Dias 27'; Silva 43'	Stadium: Villa Park; Attendance: 41,400 (2,921 away); Referee: Mike Dean
Note: Live on Amazon Prime Video

5 December 2021 15	Aston Villa	2–1	Leicester City	Aston, Birmingham
16:30 GMT	Konsa 17', 54'; Nakamba (yellow card) 55'	Report	Barnes 14'; Maddison (yellow card) 90'	Stadium: Villa Park; Attendance: 41,572 (3,012 away); Referee: Michael Oliver
Note: Live on Sky Sports

11 December 2021 16	Liverpool	1–0	Aston Villa	Liverpool
15:00 GMT	Van Dijk (yellow card) 13'; Salah 67' (pen.)	Report	Nakamba (yellow card) 19'; Watkins (yellow card) 24'	Stadium: Anfield; Attendance: 53,093 (2,936 away); Referee: Stuart Attwell

14 December 2021 17	Norwich City	0–2	Aston Villa	Norwich
19:45 GMT	Aarons (yellow card) 46'; Byram (yellow card) 55'; Williams (yellow card) 64'	Report	Ramsey 34'; Konsa (yellow card) 50'; Watkins 87'	Stadium: Carrow Road; Attendance: 26,836 (2,669 away); Referee: David Coote
Note: Live on BT Sport

26 December 2021 18	Aston Villa	1–3	Chelsea	Aston, Birmingham
17:30 GMT	James 28' (o.g.); Martínez (yellow card) 33'; Mings (yellow card) 65'; Konsa (yellow card) 90+2'	Report	Jorginho 34' (pen.), 90+3' (pen.); Lukaku 56'; Alonso (yellow card) 70'	Stadium: Villa Park; Attendance: 41,907 (2,981 away); Referee: Martin Atkinson
Note: Live on Sky Sports

==== January ====
2 January 2022 19	Brentford	2–1	Aston Villa	Brentford
14:00 GMT	Onyeka (yellow card) 31'; Wissa 42'; Toney (yellow card) 77'; Roerslev 83'	Report	Ings 16'; Ramsey (yellow card) 30'; McGinn (yellow card) 89'	Stadium: Brentford Community Stadium; Attendance: 16,876 (1,672 away); Referee: Craig Pawson
Note: Live on Sky Sports

15 January 2022 20	Aston Villa	2–2	Manchester United	Aston, Birmingham
17:30 GMT	Digne (yellow card) 27'; Ramsey 77'; Coutinho 82'	Report	Fernandes 6', 67', (yellow card) 46'; Matić (yellow card) 31'	Stadium: Villa Park; Attendance: 41,968 (2,981 away); Referee: David Coote
Note: Live on Sky Sports

22 January 2022 21	Everton	0–1	Aston Villa	Liverpool
12:30 GMT	Gomes (yellow card) 45+1'; Calvert-Lewin (yellow card) 50'; Mina (yellow card) 58'; Allan (yellow card) 82'; Godfrey (yellow card) 83'	Report	Buendía 45+3'; Martínez (yellow card) 68'; Cash (yellow card) 75'; Mings (yellow card) 86'; Ings (yellow card) 90+3'	Stadium: Goodison Park; Attendance: 38,203 (2,972 away); Referee: Craig Pawson
Note: Live on BT Sport

==== February ====
9 February 2022 22	Aston Villa	3–3	Leeds United	Aston, Birmingham
20:00 GMT	Coutinho 32'; Ramsey 38', 43'; Konsa (yellow card) 70' (yellow-red card) 87'; Cash (yellow card) 90'	Report	James 9', 45+2', (yellow card) 80'; Dallas (yellow card) 43'; Llorente 63'; Rodrigo (yellow card) 90+7'	Stadium: Villa Park; Attendance: 41,927 (2,900 away); Referee: Jarred Gillett
Note: Live on BT Sport

13 February 2022 23	Newcastle United	1–0	Aston Villa	Newcastle upon Tyne
14:00 GMT	Trippier 35'; Joelinton (yellow card) 39'; Burn (yellow card) 66'; Shelvey (yellow card) 82'	Report	McGinn (yellow card) 42'; Douglas Luiz (yellow card) 89'; Bailey (yellow card) 90+5'; Ramsey (yellow card) 90+7'	Stadium: St James' Park; Attendance: 52,207 (3,209 away); Referee: Craig Pawson
Note: Live on Sky Sports

19 February 2022 24	Aston Villa	0–1	Watford	Aston, Birmingham
15:00 GMT	Cash (yellow card) 57'	Report	Sarr (yellow card) 66'; Dennis 78'; Kamara (yellow card) 82'	Stadium: Villa Park; Attendance: 41,936 (2,779 away); Referee: Robert Jones

26 February 2022 25	Brighton & Hove Albion	0–2	Aston Villa	Falmer
15:30 GMT	Cucurella (yellow card) 16'; Trossard (yellow card) 25'; Bissouma (yellow card) 57'; Veltman (yellow card) 58'	Report	Cash 17', (yellow card) 19'; Douglas Luiz (yellow card) 25'; Mings (yellow card) 40'; Watkins (yellow card) 40', (goal) 68'; Martínez (yellow card) 83'	Stadium: American Express Community Stadium; Attendance: 31,475 (3,126 away); Referee: John Brooks

==== March ====
5 March 2022 26	Aston Villa	4–0	Southampton	Aston, Birmingham
15:00 GMT	Watkins 9', (yellow card) 74'; Douglas Luiz 44'; Coutinho 52'; Ings 54'	Report	Romeu (yellow card) 68'	Stadium: Villa Park; Attendance: 41,855 (2,959 away); Referee: Peter Bankes

10 March 2022 27	Leeds United	0–3	Aston Villa	Leeds
19:45 GMT	Koch (yellow card) 45+1'; Gelhardt (yellow card) 67'; Firpo (yellow card) 81'; James (yellow card) 86'; Raphinha (yellow card) 90+2'	Report	Watkins (yellow card) 17'; Coutinho 22'; Mings (yellow card) 47'; Douglas Luiz (yellow card) 62'; Cash 65'; Chambers 73'	Stadium: Elland Road; Attendance: 36,400 (2,913 away); Referee: Simon Hooper
Note: The match was originally scheduled for 28 December 2021, but was postponed to 10 March 2022 due to COVID-19 cases in the Leeds United squad.

13 March 2022 28	West Ham United	2–1	Aston Villa	Stratford, London
14:00 GMT	Lanzini (yellow card) 44'; Yarmolenko 70'; Fornals 82'	Report	Ramsey 90'	Stadium: London Stadium; Attendance: 59,957 (3,001 away); Referee: Jarred Gillett

19 March 2022 29	Aston Villa	0–1	Arsenal	Aston, Birmingham
12:30 GMT	Ramsey (yellow card) 15'; Mings (yellow card) 33'; McGinn (yellow card) 34'	Report	Saka 30'; Xhaka (yellow card) 45+1'; Cédric (yellow card) 57'; Partey (yellow card) 65'	Stadium: Villa Park; Attendance: 41,956 (2,961 away); Referee: Andrew Madley
Note: Live on BT Sport

==== April ====
2 April 2022 30	Wolverhampton Wanderers	2–1	Aston Villa	Wolverhampton
15:00 BST	Jonny 7' (yellow card) 66'; Coady (yellow card) 25'; Young 36' (o.g.); Marçal (yellow card) 90+2'; Neto (yellow card) 90+3'	Report	McGinn (yellow card) 38'; Watkins 86' (pen.); Young (yellow card) 90+3'; Konsa (yellow card) 90+4'	Stadium: Molineux Stadium; Attendance: 31,012 (2,969 away); Referee: Darren England

9 April 2022 31	Aston Villa	0–4	Tottenham Hotspur	Aston, Birmingham
17:30 BST	Ings (yellow card) 21'; Young (yellow card) 82'	Report	Son 3', 66', 71'; Højbjerg (yellow card) 29'; Kulusevski 50'; Emerson (yellow card) 74'; Kane (yellow card) 90+1'	Stadium: Villa Park; Attendance: 41,949 (2,961 away); Referee: Graham Scott
Note: Live on Sky Sports

23 April 2022 32	Leicester City	0–0	Aston Villa	Leicester
15:00 BST	Mendy (yellow card) 64'; Dewsbury-Hall (yellow card) 65'; Maddison (yellow card) 75'	Report	Douglas Luiz (yellow card) 72'; Bailey (yellow card) 90+5'	Stadium: King Power Stadium; Attendance: 32,185 (3,305 away); Referee: Andrew Madley

30 April 2022 33	Aston Villa	2–0	Norwich City	Aston, Birmingham
15:00 BST	Watkins 41'; Chambers (yellow card) 44'; Iroegbunam (yellow card) 61'; Ings (yellow card) 65', (goal) 90+3'; Ramsey (yellow card) 67'	Report	Aarons (yellow card) 23'	Stadium: Villa Park; Attendance: 40,290 (1,351 away); Referee: John Brooks

==== May ====
7 May 2022 34	Burnley	1–3	Aston Villa	Burnley
15:00 BST	Brownhill (yellow card) 69'; Cornet 90+1'	Report	Ings 7'; Digne (yellow card) 21'; Buendía 31'; Watkins (yellow card) 45+1', (goal) 52'	Stadium: Turf Moor; Attendance: 20,891 (2,354 away); Referee: David Coote

10 May 2022 35	Aston Villa	1–2	Liverpool	Aston, Birmingham
20:00 BST	Douglas Luiz 3'	Report	Matip 6'; Mané 65'	Stadium: Villa Park; Attendance: 41,919 (2,963 away); Referee: Jonathan Moss
Note: The match was originally scheduled for 16 April 2022, but was postponed due to Liverpool's participation in the FA Cup semi-finals.

15 May 2022 36	Aston Villa	1–1	Crystal Palace	Aston, Birmingham
14:00 BST	Mings (yellow card) 9'; Watkins 69'	Report	Gallagher (yellow card) 14'; Édouard (yellow card) 76'; Schlupp 81'; Kouyaté (yellow card) 90'	Stadium: Villa Park; Attendance: 41,136 (2,309 away); Referee: Chris Kavanagh

19 May 2022 37	Aston Villa	1–1	Burnley	Aston, Birmingham
20:00 BST	Buendía 48'	Report	Barnes 45' (pen.); Long (yellow card) 55'; Lowton (red card) 90+1'	Stadium: Villa Park; Attendance: 40,468 (1,495 away); Referee: Paul Tierney
Note: The match was originally scheduled for 18 December 2021, but was postponed due to positive COVID-19 tests in the Aston Villa squad. Live on Sky Sports

22 May 2022 38	Manchester City	3–2	Aston Villa	Manchester
16:00 BST	Gündoğan 76', 81'; Rodri 78'	Report	Cash 37'; Mings (yellow card) 49'; Coutinho 69'; Nakamba (yellow card) 86'	Stadium: Etihad Stadium; Attendance: 53,395 (3,055 away); Referee: Michael Oliver

=== FA Cup ===
Aston Villa entered the FA Cup in the third round. The draw for the third round took place on 6 December 2021 at Old Trafford and ended as a 1–0 loss to Manchester United.

10 January 2022 Third round	Manchester United	1–0	Aston Villa	Greater Manchester
19:55 GMT	McTominay 8'; Fred (yellow card) 65'; Shaw (yellow card) 68'; Dalot (yellow card) 70'	Report	Ramsey (yellow card) 12'	Stadium: Old Trafford; Attendance: 72,911; Referee: Michael Oliver
Note: Live on BBC Sport

=== EFL Cup ===
Villa entered the EFL Cup in the second round stage and were drawn away to Barrow. The third round draw took place on 25 August 2021, and Villa were drawn away to Chelsea later losing 4-3 on penalties.

24 August 2021 Second round	Barrow	0–6	Aston Villa	Barrow-in-Furness
19:45 BST	Brown (yellow card) 78'; Arthur (yellow card) 81'; Brough (yellow card) 82'	Report	Archer 10', 63', 88'; El Ghazi 24' (pen.), 45+2'; Nakamba (yellow card) 35'; Guilbert 75'	Stadium: Holker Street; Attendance: 5,349; Referee: Martin Coy
Note: Live on Sky Sports

22 September 2021 Third round	Chelsea	1–1 (4–3 p)	Aston Villa	Fulham
19:45 BST	Sarr (yellow card) 31'; Werner 54'; James (yellow card) 90+2'	Report	Archer 64'; Young (yellow card) 86'	Stadium: Stamford Bridge; Attendance: 35,892; Referee: Graham Scott
	Penalties
	Lukaku (penalty scored); Mount (penalty scored); Barkley (penalty scored); Chilwell (penalty missed); James (penalty scored)		(penalty scored) El Ghazi; (penalty missed) Young; (penalty missed) Nakamba; (penalty scored) Konsa; (penalty scored) Buendía

== Transfers ==
=== Transfers in ===
Date	Position	Nationality	Name	From	Fee	Ref.
17 May 2021	AM	(England)	Kyrie Pierre	(England) Bristol Rovers	Undisclosed	
10 June 2021	AM	(Argentina)	Emiliano Buendía	(England) Norwich City	£33,000,000	
17 June 2021	LB	(England)	Ashley Young	(Italy) Inter Milan	Free transfer	
6 July 2021	CB	(England)	Josh Feeney	(England) Fleetwood Town	Undisclosed	
9 July 2021	RB	(England)	Jayden Barber	(England) Fulham	Undisclosed	
9 July 2021	LW	(Bermuda)	Ajani Burchall	(England) Bournemouth	Undisclosed	
9 July 2021	DM	(England)	Finley Munroe	(England) Chelsea	Free transfer	
9 July 2021	GK	(England)	James Wright	(England) Manchester City	Undisclosed	
26 July 2021	CM	(England)	Finn Azaz	(England) West Bromwich Albion	Free transfer	
29 July 2021	CM	(England)	Tim Iroegbunam	(England) West Bromwich Albion	Undisclosed	
4 August 2021	RW	(Jamaica)	Leon Bailey	(Germany) Bayer Leverkusen	£30,000,000	
4 August 2021	CF	(England)	Danny Ings	(England) Southampton	£25,000,000	
16 August 2021	CF	(England)	Caleb Chukwuemeka	(England) Northampton Town	£300,000	
3 September 2021	AM	(England)	Finley Thorndike	(England) West Bromwich Albion	Free transfer	
13 October 2021	RW	(England)	Declan Frith	(England) Chelsea	Free transfer	
26 November 2021	DF	(England)	Thierry Katsukunya	(England) Coventry City	Undisclosed	
13 January 2022	LB	(France)	Lucas Digne	(England) Everton	£25,000,000	
14 January 2022	CB	(Scotland)	Kerr Smith	(Scotland) Dundee United	£2,000,000	
27 January 2022	CB	(England)	Calum Chambers	(England) Arsenal	Free transfer	
6 March 2022	AM	(Northern Ireland)	Omari Kellyman	(England) Derby County	£600,000	

=== Transfers out ===
Date	Position	Nationality	Name	To	Fee	Ref.
18 June 2021	CB	(Belgium)	Björn Engels	(Belgium) Royal Antwerp	Undisclosed	
30 June 2021	CM	(England)	Lewis Brunt	(England) Leicester City	Released	
30 June 2021	CB	(England)	Brad Burton	(England) Alvechurch	Released	
30 June 2021	CM	(Republic of Ireland)	Jack Clarke	(England) Chesterfield	Released	
30 June 2021	RB	(Egypt)	Ahmed Elmohamady	Free Agent	Released	
30 June 2021	CM	(England)	Charlie Farr	Free Agent	Released	
30 June 2021	AM	(England)	Ben Guy	(England) Hednesford Town	Released	
30 June 2021	GK	(England)	Tom Heaton	(England) Manchester United	Released	
30 June 2021	RB	(England)	Callum Rowe	(England) Exeter City	Released	
30 June 2021	CM	(England)	Harrison Sohna	(England) Sunderland	Released	
30 June 2021	CF	(England)	Michael Tait	(England) Tamworth	Released	
30 June 2021	LB	(Wales)	Neil Taylor	(England) Middlesbrough	Released	
30 June 2021	RB	(England)	Jake Walker	(Wales) Newtown	Released	
3 July 2021	CF	(Tanzania)	Mbwana Samatta	(Turkey) Fenerbahçe	Undisclosed	
5 August 2021	AM	(England)	Jack Grealish	(England) Manchester City	£100,000,000	
23 August 2021	CM	(Spain)	Mamadou Sylla	(Spain) Almería	Undisclosed	

=== Loans in ===
Date from	Position	Nationality	Name	From	Date until	Ref.
8 August 2021	CB	(England)	Axel Tuanzebe	(England) Manchester United	8 January 2022	
7 January 2022	AM	(Brazil)	Philippe Coutinho	(Spain) Barcelona	End of season	
18 January 2022	GK	(Sweden)	Robin Olsen	(Italy) Roma	End of season	

=== Loans out ===
Date from	Position	Nationality	Name	To	Date until	Ref.
7 July 2021	AM	(United States)	Indiana Vassilev	(United States) Inter Miami	23 November 2021	
11 July 2021	GK	(Croatia)	Lovre Kalinić	(Croatia) Hajduk Split	End of season	
16 July 2021	GK	(Hungary)	Ákos Onódi	(England) Bromsgrove Sporting	End of season	
26 July 2021	CM	(England)	Finn Azaz	(Wales) Newport County	End of season	
28 July 2021	LB	(England)	Sebastian Revan	(England) Grimsby Town	12 January 2022	
2 August 2021	RB	(England)	Kaine Kesler Hayden	(England) Swindon Town	9 January 2022	
6 August 2021	CF	(England)	Louie Barry	(England) Ipswich Town	3 January 2022	
16 August 2021	CF	(England)	Brad Young	(England) Carlisle United	4 January 2022	
17 August 2021	RW	(Republic of Ireland)	Tyreik Wright	(England) Salford City	14 January 2022	
20 August 2021	CM	(England)	Arjan Raikhy	(England) Stockport County	3 January 2022	
28 August 2021	CF	(Brazil)	Wesley	(Belgium) Club Brugge	7 January 2022	
30 August 2021	CM	(Republic of Ireland)	Conor Hourihane	(England) Sheffield United	End of season	
31 August 2021	CB	(England)	Dominic Revan	(England) Northampton Town	1 January 2022	
31 August 2021	CB	(England)	Mungo Bridge	(France) Annecy	27 January 2022	
31 August 2021	RB	(France)	Frédéric Guilbert	(France) Strasbourg	End of season	
1 January 2022	CF	(England)	Keinan Davis	(England) Nottingham Forest	End of season	
7 January 2022	CF	(Brazil)	Wesley	(Brazil) Internacional	1 January 2023	
11 January 2022	CM	(England)	Aaron Ramsey	(England) Cheltenham Town	End of season	
12 January 2022	CF	(England)	Caleb Chukwuemeka	(Scotland) Livingston	End of season	
13 January 2022	RW	(Netherlands)	Anwar El Ghazi	(England) Everton	End of season	
14 January 2022	LB	(England)	Sebastian Revan	(England) Hereford	End of season	
21 January 2022	LW	(England)	Jaden Philogene	(England) Stoke City	End of season	
24 January 2022	CF	(England)	Cameron Archer	(England) Preston North End	End of season	
24 January 2022	CM	(England)	Arjan Raikhy	(England) Grimsby Town	End of season	
28 January 2022	CF	(England)	Louie Barry	(England) Swindon Town	End of season	
31 January 2022	RB	(England)	Kaine Kesler Hayden	(England) Milton Keynes Dons	End of season	
31 January 2022	GK	(England)	Jed Steer	(England) Luton Town	End of season	
31 January 2022	LB	(England)	Matt Targett	(England) Newcastle United	End of season	
31 January 2022	RW	(Republic of Ireland)	Tyreik Wright	(England) Colchester United	End of season	
31 January 2022	GK	(England)	Filip Marschall	(England) Gateshead	End of season	
8 February 2022	LW	(Egypt)	Trézéguet	(Turkey) İstanbul Başakşehir	End of season	
5 May 2022	AM	(United States)	Indiana Vassilev	(United States) Inter Miami	5 November 2022	

== Squad statistics ==
=== Appearances and goals ===
No.	Pos	Nat	Player	Total		Premier League		FA Cup		EFL Cup		Other	
No.	Pos	Nat	Player	Apps	Goals	Apps	Goals	Apps	Goals	Apps	Goals	Apps	Goals
Goalkeepers
1	GK	(Argentina) ARG	Emiliano Martínez	37	0	36	0	1	0	0	0	0	0
25	GK	(Sweden) SWE	Robin Olsen	1	0	1	0	0	0	0	0	0	0
38	GK	(Finland) FIN	Viljami Sinisalo	0	0	0	0	0	0	0	0	0	0
Defenders
2	DF	(Poland) POL	Matty Cash	40	4	38	4	1	0	1	0	0	0
4	DF	(England) ENG	Ezri Konsa	31	2	29	2	1	0	0+1	0	0	0
5	DF	(England) ENG	Tyrone Mings	37	1	35+1	1	1	0	0	0	0	0
16	DF	(England) ENG	Calum Chambers	11	1	9+2	1	0	0	0	0	0	0
18	DF	(England) ENG	Ashley Young	25	0	10+14	0	0	0	1	0	0	0
27	DF	(France) FRA	Lucas Digne	16	0	16	0	0	0	0	0	0	0
30	DF	(England) ENG	Kortney Hause	9	1	4+3	1	0	0	2	0	0	0
Midfielders
6	MF	(Brazil) BRA	Douglas Luiz	35	2	31+3	2	1	0	0	0	0	0
7	MF	(Scotland) SCO	John McGinn	36	3	35	3	1	0	0	0	0	0
8	MF	(France) FRA	Morgan Sanson	11	0	3+7	0	0	0	1	0	0	0
10	MF	(Argentina) ARG	Emiliano Buendía	37	4	22+13	4	1	0	1	0	0	0
19	MF	(Zimbabwe) ZIM	Marvelous Nakamba	18	0	10+6	0	0	0	2	0	0	0
23	MF	(Brazil) BRA	Philippe Coutinho	19	5	16+3	5	0	0	0	0	0	0
33	MF	(England) ENG	Carney Chukwuemeka	14	0	2+10	0	0	0	1+1	0	0	0
36	MF	(Netherlands) NED	Lamare Bogarde	0	0	0	0	0	0	0	0	0	0
41	MF	(England) ENG	Jacob Ramsey	35	6	29+5	6	1	0	0	0	0	0
45	MF	(England) ENG	Ben Chrisene	0	0	0	0	0	0	0	0	0	0
47	MF	(England) ENG	Tim Iroegbunam	3	0	1+2	0	0	0	0	0	0	0
49	MF	(England) ENG	Hayden Lindley	1	0	0	0	0	0	0+1	0	0	0
Forwards
11	FW	(England) ENG	Ollie Watkins	36	11	33+2	11	1	0	0	0	0	0
15	FW	(Burkina Faso) BFA	Bertrand Traoré	10	0	1+8	0	0	0	1	0	0	0
20	FW	(England) ENG	Danny Ings	31	7	22+8	7	1	0	0	0	0	0
31	FW	(Jamaica) JAM	Leon Bailey	18	1	7+11	1	0	0	0	0	0	0
Players transferred or loaned out during the season
3	DF	(England) ENG	Matt Targett	19	1	17	1	1	0	1	0	0	0
9	FW	(Brazil) BRA	Wesley	1	0	0+1	0	0	0	0	0	0	0
12	GK	(England) ENG	Jed Steer	3	0	1	0	0	0	2	0	0	0
14	MF	(Republic of Ireland) IRL	Conor Hourihane	1	0	0	0	0	0	1	0	0	0
16	DF	(England) ENG	Axel Tuanzebe	11	0	6+3	0	0	0	2	0	0	0
17	FW	(Egypt) EGY	Trézéguet	1	0	0+1	0	0	0	0	0	0	0
21	FW	(Netherlands) NED	Anwar El Ghazi	12	3	4+5	1	0+1	0	2	2	0	0
24	DF	(France) FRA	Frédéric Guilbert	1	1	0	0	0	0	1	1	0	0
32	FW	(England) ENG	Jaden Philogene	4	0	0+1	0	0+1	0	1+1	0	0	0
35	FW	(England) ENG	Cameron Archer	5	4	0+3	0	0	0	2	4	0	0
39	FW	(England) ENG	Keinan Davis	1	0	0+1	0	0	0	0	0	0	0
40	MF	(England) ENG	Aaron Ramsey	1	0	0	0	0	0	0+1	0	0	0
46	FW	(England) ENG	Caleb Chukwuemeka	1	0	0	0	0	0	0+1	0	0	0

=== Goals ===
As of match played 22 May 2022

Rank	Pos.	No.	Player	Premier League	FA Cup	EFL Cup	Total
1	CF	11	(England) Ollie Watkins	11	0	0	11
2	CF	20	(England) Danny Ings	7	0	0	7
3	CM	41	(England) Jacob Ramsey	6	0	0	6
4	CAM	23	(Brazil) Philippe Coutinho	5	0	0	5
5	RB	2	(Poland) Matty Cash	4	0	0	4
5	CAM	10	(Argentina) Emiliano Buendía	4	0	0	4
5	CF	35	(England) Cameron Archer	0	0	4	4
8	CM	7	(Scotland) John McGinn	3	0	0	3
8	LW	21	(Netherlands) Anwar El Ghazi	1	0	2	3
10	CB	4	(England) Ezri Konsa	2	0	0	2
10	CM	6	(Brazil) Douglas Luiz	2	0	0	2
12	LB	3	(England) Matt Targett	1	0	0	1
12	CB	5	(England) Tyrone Mings	1	0	0	1
12	CB	16	(England) Calum Chambers	1	0	0	1
12	RB	24	(France) Frédéric Guilbert	0	0	1	1
12	CB	30	(England) Kortney Hause	1	0	0	1
12	LW	31	(Jamaica) Leon Bailey	1	0	0	1
Own Goals				2	0	0	2
Total				52	0	7	60

=== Assists ===
Not all goals have an assist.

As of match played 22 May 2022

Rank	Pos.	No.	Player	Premier League	FA Cup	EFL Cup	Total
1	CAM	10	(Argentina) Emiliano Buendía	6	0	0	6
1	CF	20	(England) Danny Ings	6	0	0	6
3	RB	2	(Poland) Matty Cash	3	0	1	4
3	CM	7	(Scotland) John McGinn	4	0	0	4
3	LB	27	(France) Lucas Digne	4	0	0	4
6	CB	5	(England) Tyrone Mings	3	0	0	3
6	CM	6	(Brazil) Douglas Luiz	3	0	0	3
6	LW	21	(Netherlands) Anwar El Ghazi	1	0	2	3
6	CAM	23	(Brazil) Philippe Coutinho	3	0	0	3
10	CF	11	(England) Ollie Watkins	2	0	0	2
10	LB	18	(England) Ashley Young	2	0	0	2
10	RW	31	(Jamaica) Leon Bailey	2	0	0	2
13	LB	3	(England) Matt Targett	1	0	1	1
13	RB	24	(France) Frédéric Guilbert	0	0	1	1
13	RW	32	(England) Jaden Philogene	0	0	1	1
13	CM	33	(England) Carney Chukwuemeka	1	0	0	1
13	CM	41	(England) Jacob Ramsey	1	0	0	1
Total				39	0	5	44

=== Clean sheets ===
As of match played 22 May 2022

Rank	No.	Player	Premier League	FA Cup	EFL Cup	Total
1	1	(Argentina) Emiliano Martínez	11	0	0	11
2	12	(England) Jed Steer	0	0	1	1
Total			11	0	1	12

=== Disciplinary record ===
As of match played 22 May 2022

Rank	Pos.	No.	Name	Premier League		FA Cup		EFL Cup		Total	
Rank	Pos.	No.	Name	Yellow card	Red card	Yellow card	Red card	Yellow card	Red card	Yellow card	Red card
1	CB	4	(England) Ezri Konsa	5	2	0	0	0	0	5	2
2	CB	5	(England) Tyrone Mings	11	0	0	0	0	0	11	0
3	RB	2	(Poland) Matty Cash	8	0	0	0	0	0	8	0
3	CM	7	(Scotland) John McGinn	8	0	0	0	0	0	8	0
5	CM	6	(Brazil) Douglas Luiz	7	0	0	0	0	0	7	0
5	CF	11	(England) Ollie Watkins	7	0	0	0	0	0	7	0
5	CM	41	(England) Jacob Ramsey	6	0	1	0	0	0	7	0
8	CM	19	(Zimbabwe) Marvelous Nakamba	5	0	0	0	1	0	6	0
9	GK	1	(Argentina) Emiliano Martínez	4	0	0	0	0	0	4	0
9	CF	20	(England) Danny Ings	3	0	0	0	0	0	4	0
11	RB	18	(England) Ashley Young	2	0	0	0	1	0	3	0
11	LW	31	(Jamaica) Leon Bailey	3	0	0	0	0	0	3	0
13	LB	3	(England) Matt Targett	2	0	0	0	0	0	2	0
13	LW	21	(Netherlands) Anwar El Ghazi	2	0	0	0	0	0	2	0
13	LB	27	(France) Lucas Digne	2	0	0	0	0	0	2	0
16	RW	10	(Argentina) Emiliano Buendía	1	0	0	0	0	0	1	0
16	CB	16	(England) Axel Tuanzebe	1	0	0	0	0	0	1	0
16	CB	16	(England) Calum Chambers	1	0	0	0	0	0	1	0
16	CM	47	(England) Tim Iroegbunam	1	0	0	0	0	0	1	0
		Total		75	2	1	0	2	0	79	2

== Club awards ==
=== Player of the Month award ===
Voted for by fans on Aston Villa's official website.

Month	Player
August	Not awarded
September	Not awarded
October	Not awarded
November	(Zimbabwe) Marvelous Nakamba
December	(England) Jacob Ramsey
January	(Argentina) Emiliano Buendía
February	(Brazil) Philippe Coutinho
March	(Poland) Matty Cash
April	Not awarded
May	(Poland) Matty Cash

=== Goal of the Month award ===
Voted for by fans on Aston Villa's Twitter account.

Month	Player	Competition	Opponent
August	(England) Danny Ings	Premier League	Newcastle United
September	(England) Cameron Archer	EFL Cup	Chelsea
October	Not awarded		
November	(Scotland) John McGinn	Premier League	Crystal Palace
December	(England) Jacob Ramsey	Premier League	Norwich City
January	(Brazil) Philippe Coutinho	Premier League	Manchester United
February	(Poland) Matty Cash	Premier League	Brighton & Hove Albion
March	(England) Calum Chambers	Premier League	Leeds United
April	Not awarded		
May	(Brazil) Philippe Coutinho	Premier League	Manchester City

=== End of Season awards ===
Award	Winner
Supporter's Player of the Season	(Poland) Matty Cash
Player's Player of the Season	(England) Jacob Ramsey
Young Player of the Season	(England) Jacob Ramsey
Goal of the Season	Danny Ings (vs. Newcastle United, 21 August 2021)

== See also ==
- List of Aston Villa F.C. seasons
