= 2022–23 Aston Villa F.C. season =

English football club season

Aston Villa
2022–23 season
- Owner(s): V Sports (Nassef Sawiris and Wes Edens)
- Chairman: Nassef Sawiris
- Head coach: Steven Gerrard (until 21 October); Unai Emery (from 1 November)
- Stadium: Villa Park
- Premier League: 7th
- FA Cup: Third round
- EFL Cup: Third round
- Top goalscorer: League: Ollie Watkins (15); All: Ollie Watkins (16)
- Highest home attendance: 42,212 vs Brighton & Hove Albion (28 May 2023, Premier League)
- Lowest home attendance: 32,343 vs Stevenage (8 January 2023, FA Cup)
- Average home league attendance: 41,679
- Biggest win: 4–0 vs Brentford, Premier League, 23 October 2022
- Biggest defeat: 0–4 vs Newcastle United, Premier League, 29 October 2022
| Home colours | Away colours | Third colours |

The 2022-23 season was Aston Villa's 28th season in the Premier League. The 2022–23 Premier League season was the club's 148th season in English football and the club's fourth consecutive season in the Premier League. In addition to the league, they also competed in the FA Cup, being eliminated by Stevenage in the third round, and the EFL Cup, being eliminated by Manchester United in the third round. The season covers the period from 1 July 2022 to 30 June 2023.

On 20 October, Steven Gerrard was sacked after less than a year in charge and a 32.5% win ratio as well as a slow start to the Premier League season, in which he won two out of 11 Premier League games. He also had Villa just outside the relegation zone on goals scored in 17th. Four days later, Unai Emery was appointed as manager from Villarreal.

After the arrival of Emery, Villa's fortunes took a turn for the better, with the club winning 15 and taking 49 points from their last 25 games, including a five-match winning run as the club finished in 7th place, their highest position in the English League system since 2009–10, gaining them a place in the UEFA Europa Conference League play-off round, invoking the club's first continental participation since the 2010–11 season. This marked Villa's longest top-flight winning run since 1998.

The season was the first since 2015–16 without Conor Hourihane, who departed to Derby County following the expiration of his contract after a season and a half of loans.

== Kits ==
Supplier: Castore / Sponsor: Cazoo / Sleeve sponsor: Kaiyun Sports

| Home | Home Alt. | Away | Away Alt. 1 | Away Alt. 2 | Third | Alt. Third |

== Players ==
=== Squad ===
Age at end of season (30 June 2023)

| N | Pos. | Nat. | Name | Age | Since | App | Goals | Ends | Transfer fee | Previous Club | Notes |
|---|---|---|---|---|---|---|---|---|---|---|---|
| 1 | GK | (Argentina) | Emiliano Martínez | 2 September 1992 (aged 30) | 2020 | 112 | 0 | 2027 | £17,000,000 | (England) Arsenal | Vice-Captain |
| 2 | DF | (Poland) | Matty Cash | 7 August 1997 (aged 25) | 2020 | 96 | 4 | 2027 | £14,000,000 | (England) Nottingham Forest | |
| 3 | DF | (Brazil) | Diego Carlos | 15 March 1993 (aged 30) | 2022 | 3 | 0 | 2026 | £26,000,000 | (Spain) Sevilla | Vice-Captain |
| 4 | DF | (England) | Ezri Konsa | 23 October 1997 (aged 25) | 2019 | 138 | 6 | 2026 | £12,000,000 | (England) Brentford | |
| 5 | DF | (England) | Tyrone Mings | 13 March 1993 (aged 30) | 2019 | 165 | 8 | 2027 | £20,000,000 | (England) Bournemouth | |
| 6 | MF | (Brazil) | Douglas Luiz | 9 May 1998 (aged 25) | 2019 | 151 | 12 | 2026 | £15,000,000 | (England) Manchester City | |
| 7 | MF | (Scotland) | John McGinn | 18 October 1994 (aged 28) | 2018 | 184 | 17 | 2025 | £3,500,000 | (Scotland) Hibernian | Captain |
| 8 | MF | (France) | Morgan Sanson | 18 August 1994 (aged 28) | 2021 (Winter) | 24 | 1 | 2025 | £14,000,000 | (France) Marseille | On loan at Strasbourg |
| 9 | FW | (Burkina Faso) | Bertrand Traoré | 6 September 1995 (aged 27) | 2020 | 56 | 10 | 2024 | £17,000,000 | (France) Olympique Lyonnais | |
| 10 | MF | (Argentina) | Emiliano Buendía | 25 December 1996 (aged 26) | 2021 | 78 | 9 | 2026 | £33,000,000 | (England) Norwich City | Current record signing |
| 11 | FW | (England) | Ollie Watkins | 30 December 1995 (aged 27) | 2020 | 116 | 43 | 2025 | £28,000,000 | (England) Brentford | |
| 12 | GK | (England) | Jed Steer | 8 June 1993 (aged 30) | 2013 | 36 | 0 | 2023 | £400,000 | (England) Norwich City | |
| 15 | DF | (Spain) | Álex Moreno | 8 June 1993 (aged 30) | 2023 (Winter) | 19 | 0 | 2026 | £13,200,000 | (Spain) Real Betis | |
| 16 | DF | (England) | Calum Chambers | 20 January 1995 (aged 28) | 2022 (Winter) | 28 | 1 | 2025 | Free | (England) Arsenal | |
| 18 | DF | (England) | Ashley Young | 9 July 1985 (aged 37) | 2021 | 246 | 40 | 2023 | Free | (Italy) Inter Milan | Club Captain |
| 19 | MF | (Zimbabwe) | Marvelous Nakamba | 19 January 1994 (aged 29) | 2019 | 67 | 0 | 2024 | £10,200,000 | (Belgium) Club Brugge | On loan at Luton Town |
| 22 | FW | (Colombia) | Jhon Durán | 13 December 2003 (aged 19) | 2023 (Winter) | 12 | 0 | ? | £14,700,000 | (United States) Chicago Fire | |
| 23 | MF | (Brazil) | Philippe Coutinho | 12 June 1992 (aged 31) | 2022 | 41 | 6 | 2026 | £17,000,000 | (Spain) Barcelona | |
| 25 | GK | (Sweden) | Robin Olsen | 8 January 1990 (aged 33) | 2022 | 7 | 0 | 2025 | £3,000,000 | (Italy) Roma | |
| 27 | DF | (France) | Lucas Digne | 20 July 1993 (aged 29) | 2022 (Winter) | 46 | 2 | 2026 | £25,000,000 | (England) Everton | |
| 29 | DF | (England) | Kaine Kesler-Hayden | 23 October 2002 (aged 20) | 2018 | 1 | 0 | 2026 | Academy | Academy | |
| 30 | DF | (England) | Kortney Hause | 16 July 1995 (aged 27) | 2019 | 55 | 4 | 2025 | £3,000,000 | (England) Wolverhampton Wanderers | On loan at Watford |
| 31 | FW | (Jamaica) | Leon Bailey | 9 August 1997 (aged 25) | 2021 | 54 | 6 | 2025 | £30,000,000 | (Germany) Bayer Leverkusen | |
| 32 | MF | (Belgium) | Leander Dendoncker | 15 April 1995 (aged 28) | 2022 | 21 | 0 | 2025 | £13,000,000 | (England) Wolverhampton Wanderers | |
| 35 | FW | (England) | Cameron Archer | 9 December 2001 (aged 21) | 2007 | 20 | 11 | 2027 | Academy | Academy | On loan at Middlesbrough |
| 36 | MF | (Netherlands) | Lamare Bogarde | 5 January 2004 (aged 19) | 2020 | 6 | 0 | 2026 | Free | (Netherlands) Feyenoord | On loan at Bristol Rovers |
| 37 | MF | (Republic of Ireland) | Finn Azaz | 7 September 2000 (aged 22) | 2021 | 0 | 0 | 2025 | Free | (England) West Bromwich Albion | On loan at Plymouth Argyle |
| 38 | GK | (Finland) | Viljami Sinisalo | 11 October 2001 (aged 21) | 2018 | 2 | 0 | 2027 | Free | (Finland) Espoo | |
| 39 | FW | (England) | Keinan Davis | 13 February 1998 (aged 25) | 2015 | 87 | 7 | 2024 | Academy | Academy | On loan at Watford |
| 40 | MF | (England) | Aaron Ramsey | 21 January 2003 (aged 20) | 2007 | 4 | 1 | 2025 | Academy | Academy | On loan at Middlesbrough |
| 41 | MF | (England) | Jacob Ramsey | 28 May 2001 (aged 22) | 2007 | 101 | 12 | 2027 | Academy | Academy | |
| 42 | GK | (England) | Filip Marschall | 24 April 2003 (aged 20) | 2018 | 3 | 0 | 2027 | Academy | Academy | On loan at Gateshead |
| 43 | FW | (England) | Brad Young | 6 January 2003 (aged 20) | 2018 | 4 | 0 | 2024 | Academy | Academy | |
| 44 | MF | (France) | Boubacar Kamara | 23 November 1999 (aged 23) | 2022 | 26 | 0 | 2027 | Free | (France) Marseille | |
| 45 | DF | (England) | Ben Chrisene | 12 January 2004 (aged 19) | 2020 | 3 | 0 | 2026 | £450,000 | (England) Exeter City | On loan at Kilmarnock |
| 46 | FW | (England) | Caleb Chukwuemeka | 25 January 2002 (aged 21) | 2021 | 4 | 0 | 2024 | £300,000 | (England) Northampton Town | On loan at Crawley Town |
| 47 | MF | (England) | Tim Iroegbunam | 30 June 2003 (aged 20) | 2021 | 8 | 0 | 2027 | Free | (England) West Bromwich Albion | On loan at Queens Park Rangers |
| 48 | GK | (Poland) | Oliwier Zych | 28 June 2004 (aged 19) | 2020 | 3 | 0 | 2026 | Free | (Poland) Zagłębie Lubin | |
| 49 | MF | (England) | Hayden Lindley | 2 September 2002 (aged 20) | 2019 | 7 | 0 | 2024 | Academy | Academy | |
| 50 | DF | (Netherlands) | Sil Swinkels | 6 January 2004 (aged 19) | 2020 | 5 | 0 | 2025 | Free | (Netherlands) Vitesse Arnhem | |
| 55 | MF | (England) | Arjan Raikhy | 20 October 2002 (aged 20) | 2019 | 5 | 0 | 2024 | Academy | Academy | |
| 56 | DF | (England) | Sebastian Revan | 14 July 2003 (aged 19) | 2013 | 5 | 1 | ? | Academy | Academy | |
| 59 | DF | (England) | Josh Feeney | 6 May 2005 (aged 18) | 2021 | 3 | 0 | 2026 | £170,000 | (England) Fleetwood Town | |
| 62 | MF | (Bermuda) | Ajani Burchall | 5 November 2004 (aged 18) | 2021 | 0 | 0 | 2025 | £125,000 | (England) Bournemouth | |
| 63 | DF | (Scotland) | Kerr Smith | 12 December 2004 (aged 18) | 2022 (Winter) | 2 | 0 | 2026 | £2,000,000 | (Scotland) Dundee United | |
| 67 | MF | (England) | Declan Frith | 16 May 2002 (aged 21) | 2021 | 2 | 0 | 2024 | Free | (England) Chelsea | |
| 68 | MF | (England) | Edward Rowe | 17 October 2003 (aged 19) | 2019 | 4 | 0 | 2025 | Academy | Academy | |
| 75 | FW | (Scotland) | Rory Wilson | 5 January 2006 (aged 17) | 2022 | 2 | 0 | 2026 | £350,000 | (Scotland) Rangers | |
| | MF | (England) | Jaden Philogene | 8 February 2002 (aged 21) | 2019 | 9 | 2 | 2026 | Academy | Academy | On loan at Cardiff City |
| | FW | (Brazil) | Wesley | 24 November 1996 (aged 26) | 2019 | 26 | 6 | 2024 | £22,000,000 | (Belgium) Club Brugge | On loan at Levante |
| | FW | (England) | Louie Barry | 21 June 2003 (aged 20) | 2019 (Winter) | 2 | 1 | 2024 | £885,000 | (Spain) Barcelona | On loan at Salford City |

== Transfers ==
=== In ===
| Date | Pos. | Player | Transferred from | Fee | Ref. |
|---|---|---|---|---|---|
| 10 June 2022 (Note: The transfer was announced on 12 May, and would become official on 10 June once the transfer window opened.) | AM | (Brazil) Philippe Coutinho | (Spain) Barcelona | £17,000,000 | |
| 10 June 2022 (Note: The transfer was announced on 26 May, and would become official on 10 June once the transfer window opened.) | CB | (Brazil) Diego Carlos | (Spain) Sevilla | £26,000,000 | |
| 10 June 2022 (Note: The transfer was announced on 4 June, and would become official on 10 June once the transfer window opened.) | GK | (Sweden) Robin Olsen | (Italy) Roma | £3,000,000 | |
| 1 July 2022 (Note: The transfer was announced on 23 May, and would become official on 1 July once his Marseille contract expired.) | DM | (France) Boubacar Kamara | (France) Marseille | Free transfer | |
| 4 July 2022 | CF | (Scotland) Rory Wilson | (Scotland) Rangers | £350,000 | |
| 28 July 2022 | CM | (Scotland) Ewan Simpson | (Scotland) Heart of Midlothian | £100,000 | |
| 1 September 2022 | DM | (Belgium) Leander Dendoncker | (England) Wolverhampton Wanderers | £13,000,000 | |
| 11 January 2023 | LB | (Spain) Álex Moreno | (Spain) Real Betis | £13,200,000 | |
| 23 January 2023 | CF | (Colombia) Jhon Durán | (United States) Chicago Fire | £14,700,000 | |

=== Out ===
| Date | Pos. | Player | Transferred to | Fee | Ref. |
|---|---|---|---|---|---|
| 10 June 2022 (Note: The transfer was announced on 8 June, and would become official on 10 June once the transfer window opened.) | LB | (England) Matt Targett | (England) Newcastle United | £15,000,000 | |
| 30 June 2022 | LW | (England) Tristan Abldeen-Goodridge | (England) Reading | Released | |
| 30 June 2022 | CB | (England) Paul Appiah | (England) Leicester City | Released | |
| 30 June 2022 | CB | (England) Mungo Bridge | Free agent | Released | |
| 30 June 2022 | CM | (Republic of Ireland) Conor Hourihane | (England) Derby County | Released | |
| 30 June 2022 | GK | (Hungary) Ákos Onódi | (Cyprus) Akritas Chlorakas | Released | |
| 30 June 2022 | CB | (England) Dominic Revan | (England) Barnet | Released | |
| 30 June 2022 | AM | (England) Finley Thorndike | (England) Birmingham City | Released | |
| 1 July 2022 | GK | (Croatia) Lovre Kalinić | (Croatia) Hajduk Split | Free transfer | |
| 4 July 2022 | LW | (Egypt) Trézéguet | (Turkey) Trabzonspor | £4,250,000 | |
| 7 July 2022 | RW | (England) Kahrel Reddin | (England) Stoke City | Undisclosed | |
| 2 August 2022 | CM | (England) Carney Chukwuemeka | (England) Chelsea | £20,000,000 | |
| 30 August 2022 | RW | (Netherlands) Anwar El Ghazi | (Netherlands) PSV Eindhoven | Undisclosed | |
| 9 January 2023 | RW | (Republic of Ireland) Tyreik Wright | (England) Plymouth Argyle | Undisclosed | |
| 17 January 2023 | RB | (France) Frédéric Guilbert | (France) Strasbourg | Free transfer | |
| 17 January 2023 | LW | (United States) Indiana Vassilev | (United States) St. Louis City | Undisclosed | |
| 20 January 2023 | CF | (England) Danny Ings | (England) West Ham United | £12,000,000 | |

=== Loans in ===
| Date | Pos. | Player | Loaned from | On loan until | Ref. |
|---|---|---|---|---|---|
| 11 July 2022 | LB | (Sweden) Ludwig Augustinsson | (Spain) Sevilla | 30 January 2023 (Note: On 30 January, Sevilla recalled Augustinsson from his season-long loan.) | |
| 1 September 2022 | CB | (Poland) Jan Bednarek | (England) Southampton | 23 January 2023 (Note: On 23 January, Southampton recalled Bednarek from his season-long loan.) | |

=== Loans out ===
| Date | Pos. | Player | Loaned to | On loan until | Ref. |
|---|---|---|---|---|---|
| 7 January 2022 | CF | (Brazil) Wesley | (Brazil) Internacional | 22 July 2022 (Note: On 22 July, Wesley was loaned to Levante. Prior to this, he had been recalled from a loan to Internacional that had been set to last for a year from 7 January 2022.) | |
| 5 May 2022 | LW | (United States) Indiana Vassilev | (United States) Inter Miami | 12 November 2022 | |
| 11 July 2022 | CM | (Republic of Ireland) Finn Azaz | (England) Plymouth Argyle | End of season | |
| 11 July 2022 | GK | (Finland) Viljami Sinisalo | (England) Burton Albion | 3 January 2023 (Note: On 3 January, Sinisalo was recalled from his season-long loan at Burton Albion.) | |
| 12 July 2022 | LW | (England) Louie Barry | (England) Milton Keynes Dons | 30 January 2023 (Note: On 30 January, Barry was recalled from his season-long loan at MK Dons and was subsequently loaned to Salford City.) | |
| 22 July 2022 | CF | (Brazil) Wesley | (Spain) Levante | End of season | |
| 26 July 2022 | LW | (England) Jaden Philogene | (Wales) Cardiff City | End of season | |
| 5 August 2022 | CM | (England) Aaron Ramsey | (England) Norwich City | 3 January 2023 (Note: On 3 January, Ramsay was recalled from his season-long loan at Norwich due to an injury. He was subsequently loaned to Middlesbrough.) | |
| 12 August 2022 | RB | (England) Kaine Kesler-Hayden | (England) Huddersfield Town | 15 January 2023 (Note: On 15 January, Kesler-Hayden was recalled from his season-long loan at Huddersfield.) | |
| 13 August 2022 | CF | (England) Keinan Davis | (England) Watford | End of season | |
| 22 August 2022 | RW | (Burkina Faso) Bertrand Traoré | (Turkey) İstanbul Başakşehir | 31 January 2023 (Note: On 31 January 2023, Traore was recalled from his season-long loan at İstanbul Başakşehir.) | |
| 22 August 2022 | CB | (England) Kortney Hause | (England) Watford | End of season | |
| 25 August 2022 | LB | (England) Ben Chrisene | (Scotland) Kilmarnock | End of season | |
| 1 September 2022 | CF | (England) Caleb Chukwuemeka | (England) Crawley Town | End of season | |
| 1 September 2022 | CM | (England) Tim Iroegbunam | (England) Queens Park Rangers | End of season | |
| 1 September 2022 | DM | (England) Hayden Lindley | (Wales) Newport County | 1 January 2023 (Note: On 1 January, Lindley was recalled from his season-long loan at Newport County.) | |
| 1 September 2022 | RW | (Republic of Ireland) Tyreik Wright | (England) Bradford City | 9 January 2023 (Note: On 9 January, Wright was recalled from his season-long loan at Bradford City. He was subsequently sold to Plymouth Arygle.) | |
| 1 September 2022 | CF | (England) Brad Young | (Scotland) Ayr United | 17 January 2023 (Note: On 17 January, Young was recalled from his season-long loan at Ayr United.) | |
| 6 January 2023 | CF | (England) Cameron Archer | (England) Middlesbrough | End of season | |
| 20 January 2023 | GK | (England) Filip Marschall | (England) Gateshead | End of season | |
| 23 January 2023 | CM | (France) Morgan Sanson | (France) Strasbourg | End of season | |
| 30 January 2023 | LW | (England) Louie Barry | (England) Salford City | End of season | |
| 31 January 2023 | CM | (England) Aaron Ramsey | (England) Middlesbrough | End of season | |
| 31 January 2023 | CM | (Zimbabwe) Marvelous Nakamba | (England) Luton Town | End of season | |
| 31 January 2023 | CM | (Netherlands) Lamare Bogarde | (England) Bristol Rovers | End of season | |

== Pre and mid-season friendlies ==
In April 2022, Aston Villa announced they would travel to Australia on a pre-season tour to compete in the Queensland Champions Cup, where they faced Leeds United and Brisbane Roar. They also competed in ICON Festival of Football during the stay in Australia where they would come up against Manchester United. On 24 May 2022, Aston Villa announced two further friendlies away at Rennes and the traditional friendly at Walsall. On 10 June, local non-league club Chasetown announced that they would be having a pre-season friendly against a Villa XI. Later friendlies against Leamington and Hednesford Town were announced for those players that did not make the journey to Australia.

On 11 November 2022, Aston Villa announced a friendly had been organised with Villarreal on 15 December, in order to help both teams to prepare for the resumption of the league after the 2022 FIFA World Cup. A "competitive first-team friendly" was also organised between Aston Villa and Cardiff City to help those players who were not going to the World Cup retain their fitness. However, the main purpose of this match was to act as a memorial match for Peter Whittingham, who died in 2020 at the age of 35, and who played for both teams. Proceeds from ticket sales for the match were to be donated to charities chosen by Whittingham's family. On 24 November, Villa announced one more friendly, in the United Arab Emirates, against Chelsea for the Al Wahda FC Challenge Cup. On 1 December, Villa announced a further UAE friendly, this one a behind-closed-doors match against Brighton & Hove Albion.

=== Pre-season ===
Win Draw Loss Fixtures

| 8 July 2022 Friendly | Chasetown | 2–8 | Aston Villa XI | Chasetown |
| 19:45 BST | Kirton 9'; Burrogh 76' | Report | Barry 10'; B. Young 28'; Wright 39'; Cal. Chukwuemeka 52', 58' (pen.), 74'; Lutz 87'; Moore 90' | Stadium: The Scholars Ground; Attendance: 2,800 |

| 9 July 2022 Friendly | Walsall | 0–4 | Aston Villa | Walsall |
| 13:00 BST | | Report | Bailey 8'; Archer 38'; Watkins 53'; Douglas Luiz 70' | Stadium: Bescot Stadium; Attendance: 9,409 |

| 12 July 2022 Friendly | Hednesford Town | 4–3 | Aston Villa XI | Hednesford |
| 19:30 BST | McQuilkin 70'; Tilt 72'; Coff 83', 88' | Report | El Ghazi 13'; Cal. Chukwuemeka 19' (pen.); Ealing 36' | Stadium: Keys Park; Attendance: 824 |

| 16 July 2022 Friendly | Leamington | 1–2 | Aston Villa XI | Leamington Spa |
| 13:00 BST | Turner 39' | Report | B. Young 90' (pen.); K. Young 90+2' | Stadium: New Windmill Ground; Attendance: 377 |
Note: Originally scheduled for a 15:00 start, but was moved to 13:00 to avoid playing during the hottest part of the day during the 2022 European heat waves.

| 17 July 2022 Friendly - Queensland Champions Cup | Aston Villa | 1–0 | Leeds United | Brisbane, Australia |
| 14:35 AEST; 05:35 BST | Coutinho (penalty missed) 24'; Ings 63' (pen.); McGinn (yellow card) 70' | Report | Gray (yellow card) 67' | Stadium: Suncorp Stadium; Attendance: 40,918; Referee: Adam Kersey |

| 20 July 2022 Friendly - Queensland Champions Cup | Brisbane Roar | 0–1 | Aston Villa | South Townsville, Australia |
| 19:45 AEST; 10:45 BST | Daley (yellow card) 69' | Report | Digne (yellow card) 14'; Archer 77' | Stadium: Queensland Country Bank Stadium |

| 23 July 2022 Friendly | Manchester United | 2–2 | Aston Villa | Perth, Australia |
| 17:45 AWST; 10:45 BST | Sancho 25'; Cash 42' (o.g.); Chong (yellow card) 78'; Bailly (yellow card) 90+2' | Report | Coutinho (yellow card) 13'; Bailey 49'; McGinn (yellow card) 51'; Chambers 90+3' | Stadium: Optus Stadium; Attendance: 58,228; Referee: Alireza Faghani |

| 30 July 2022 Friendly | Rennes | 1–2 | Aston Villa | Rennes, France |
| 18:00 CEST; 17:00 BST | Theate 7'; Belocian (yellow card) 77' | Report | Bailey 14'; Douglas Luiz (yellow card) 59'; Diego Carlos 81'; Iroegbunam (yellow card) 90+2' | Stadium: Roazhon Park; Attendance: 19,706; Referee: Willy Delajod |

=== Mid-season ===
| 30 November 2022 Peter Whittingham Memorial Match | Cardiff City | 3–1 | Aston Villa | Cardiff |
| 19:30 GMT | Tanner 40'; Etete 54', 73' | Report | Ramsey 59' | Stadium: Cardiff City Stadium; Attendance: 10,027 |

| 8 December 2022 Friendly | Aston Villa | 2–2 | Brighton & Hove Albion | Dubai, United Arab Emirates |
| 17:00 GST; 13:00 GMT | Ings 67'; Dunk 87' (o.g.) | Report | Undav 73', 81' | Stadium: Jebel Ali Sports Centre; Attendance: 0 |

| 11 December 2022 Al Wadha FC Challenge Cup | Aston Villa | 1–0 | Chelsea | Abu Dhabi, United Arab Emirates |
| 18:10 GST; 14:10 GMT | McGinn 7' | Report | Brooking (yellow card) 66' | Stadium: Al Nahyan Stadium; Referee: Omar Al Ali |

| 15 December 2022 Friendly | Aston Villa | 0–1 | Villarreal | Aston, Birmingham |
| 20:00 GMT | | Report | Capoue 78' | Stadium: Villa Park; Attendance: 13,591; Referee: Darren Bond |

| 21 December 2022 Friendly | Everton | 2–0 | Aston Villa | Liverpool |
| 14:00 GMT | Gordon 7'; Maupay 12' | Report | | Stadium: Goodison Park; Attendance: 0 |

| 24 March 2023 Friendly | Aston Villa | 1–3 | Bristol Rovers | Bodymoor Heath |
| 13:00 GMT | Kellyman 85' | Report | Coburn 16'; Loft 55'; Marquis 67' | Stadium: Bodymoor Heath Training Ground; Attendance: 0 |

== Competitions ==
=== Overall record ===
| Competition | First match | Last match | Starting round | Final position | Record | | | | | | | |
| Competition | First match | Last match | Starting round | Final position | Pld | W | D | L | GF | GA | GD | Win % |
|---|---|---|---|---|---|---|---|---|---|---|---|---|
| Premier League | 6 August 2022 | 28 May 2023 | Matchday 1 | 7th | 38 | 18 | 7 | 13 | 51 | 46 | +5 | 47.37 |
| FA Cup | 8 January 2023 | | Third round | Third round | 1 | 0 | 0 | 1 | 1 | 2 | −1 | 0.00 |
| EFL Cup | 23 August 2022 | 10 November 2022 | Second round | Third round | 2 | 1 | 0 | 1 | 6 | 5 | +1 | 50.00 |
| Total | | | | | 41 | 19 | 7 | 15 | 58 | 53 | +5 | 46.34 |

Source: Soccerway

=== Premier League ===
==== League table ====
| Pos | Team | Pld | W | D | L | GF | GA | GD | Pts | Qualification or relegation |
|---|---|---|---|---|---|---|---|---|---|---|
| 5 | Liverpool | 38 | 19 | 10 | 9 | 75 | 47 | +28 | 67 | Qualification to Europa League group stage (Note: Since the winners of the 2022–23 FA Cup, Manchester City, qualified for the Champions League, the spot given to the FA Cup winners (Europa League group stage) was passed to the sixth-placed team.) |
| 6 | Brighton & Hove Albion | 38 | 18 | 8 | 12 | 72 | 53 | +19 | 62 | Qualification to Europa League group stage |
| 7 | Aston Villa | 38 | 18 | 7 | 13 | 51 | 46 | +5 | 61 | Qualification to Europa Conference League play-off round (Note: Since the winners of the 2022–23 EFL Cup, Manchester United, qualified for the Champions League, the spot given to the League Cup winners (Europa Conference League play-off round) was passed to the seventh-placed team.) |
| 8 | Tottenham Hotspur | 38 | 18 | 6 | 14 | 70 | 63 | +7 | 60 | |
| 9 | Brentford | 38 | 15 | 14 | 9 | 58 | 46 | +12 | 59 | |

Source: Premier League
Rules for classification: 1) Points; 2) Goal difference; 3) Goals scored; 4) If the champions, relegated teams or qualified teams for UEFA competitions cannot be determined by rules 1 to 3, rules 4.1 to 4.3 are applied – 4.1) Points gained in head-to-head record between such teams; 4.2) Away goals scored in head-to-head record between such teams; 4.3) Play-offs

==== Results summary ====
| Overall | | | | | | | | Home | | | | | | Away | | | | | |
| Pld | W | D | L | GF | GA | GD | Pts | W | D | L | GF | GA | GD | W | D | L | GF | GA | GD |
|---|---|---|---|---|---|---|---|---|---|---|---|---|---|---|---|---|---|---|---|
| 38 | 18 | 7 | 13 | 51 | 46 | +5 | 61 | 12 | 2 | 5 | 33 | 21 | +12 | 6 | 5 | 8 | 18 | 25 | −7 |

Source: Premier League

==== Results by round ====
| Round | 1 | 2 | 3 | 4 | 5 | 6 | 7 | 8 | 9 | 10 | 11 | 12 | 13 | 14 | 15 | 16 | 17 | 18 | 19 | 20 | 21 | 22 | 23 | 24 | 25 | 26 | 27 | 28 | 29 | 30 | 31 | 32 | 33 | 34 | 35 | 36 | 37 | 38 |
|---|---|---|---|---|---|---|---|---|---|---|---|---|---|---|---|---|---|---|---|---|---|---|---|---|---|---|---|---|---|---|---|---|---|---|---|---|---|---|
| Ground | A | H | A | H | A | H | H | A | A | H | A | H | A | H | A | H | A | H | H | A | H | A | H | A | H | A | H | A | A | H | H | A | H | A | A | H | A | H |
| Result | L | W | L | L | L | D | W | D | D | L | L | W | L | W | W | L | W | D | W | W | L | L | L | W | W | D | W | W | W | W | W | D | W | L | L | W | D | W |
| Position | 16 | 9 | 13 | 15 | 19 | 17 | 15 | 14 | 16 | 16 | 17 | 15 | 16 | 13 | 12 | 12 | 12 | 11 | 11 | 11 | 11 | 11 | 11 | 11 | 11 | 11 | 11 | 9 | 7 | 6 | 6 | 6 | 6 | 7 | 8 | 8 | 7 | 7 |
| Points | 0 | 3 | 3 | 3 | 3 | 4 | 7 | 8 | 9 | 9 | 9 | 12 | 12 | 15 | 18 | 18 | 21 | 22 | 25 | 28 | 28 | 28 | 28 | 31 | 34 | 35 | 38 | 41 | 44 | 47 | 50 | 51 | 54 | 54 | 54 | 57 | 58 | 61 |

Source: Premier League
A = Away; H = Home; W = Win; D = Draw; L = Loss; P = Postponed

==== Matches ====
Win Draw Loss Fixtures

The league fixtures were announced on 16 June 2022 at 9:00 BST.

| 6 August 2022 1 | Bournemouth | 2–0 | Aston Villa | Kings Park, Bournemouth |
| 15:00 BST | Lerma 2'; Smith (yellow card) 39'; Pearson (yellow card) 45+2'; Billing (yellow card) 73'; Moore 80' | Report | Ings (yellow card) 23'; Ramsey (yellow card) 45+3'; Douglas Luiz (yellow card) 90+3' | Stadium: Vitality Stadium; Attendance: 10,000 (1,318 away); Referee: Peter Bankes |

| 13 August 2022 2 | Aston Villa | 2–1 | Everton | Aston, Birmingham |
| 12:30 BST | Coutinho (yellow card) 29'; Ings 31', (yellow card) 75'; Digne (yellow card) 49'; Buendía 86'; Young (yellow card) 90+8' | Report | Davies (yellow card) 43'; Digne 87' (o.g.) | Stadium: Villa Park; Attendance: 41,883 (2,961 away); Referee: Michael Oliver |
Note: Live on BT Sport

| 20 August 2022 3 | Crystal Palace | 3–1 | Aston Villa | Selhurst |
| 15:00 BST | Zaha 7', 58', (yellow card) 39'; Mateta 71'; Schlupp (yellow card) 75' | Report | Watkins 5'; McGinn (yellow card) 36' | Stadium: Selhurst Park; Attendance: 22,012 (2,757 away); Referee: Andrew Madley |

| 28 August 2022 4 | Aston Villa | 0–1 | West Ham United | Aston, Birmingham |
| 14:00 BST | Cash (yellow card) 57'; Kamara (yellow card) 79' | Report | Fornals 74' | Stadium: Villa Park; Attendance: 41,796 (2,961 away); Referee: David Coote |

| 31 August 2022 5 | Arsenal | 2–1 | Aston Villa | Holloway |
| 19:30 BST | Gabriel Jesus 30'; Ødegaard (yellow card) 39'; Saliba (yellow card) 48'; Martinelli 77' | Report | Ramsey (yellow card) 13'; Konsa (yellow card) 54'; McGinn (yellow card) 68'; Douglas Luiz 74' | Stadium: Emirates Stadium; Attendance: 60,012 (3,003 away); Referee: Robert Jones |
Note: Live on BT Sport

| 3 September 2022 6 | Aston Villa | 1–1 | Manchester City | Aston, Birmingham |
| 17:30 BST | Cash (yellow card) 26'; Digne (yellow card) 71'; Bailey 74' | Report | Haaland 50' | Stadium: Villa Park; Attendance: 41,830 (2,961 away); Referee: Simon Hooper |
Note: Live on Sky Sports

| 16 September 2022 8 | Aston Villa | 1–0 | Southampton | Aston, Birmingham |
| 20:00 BST | Ramsey 41', (yellow card) 58'; Coutinho (yellow card) 45+4'; Young (yellow card) 90+1' | Report | Ward-Prowse (yellow card) 82' | Stadium: Villa Park; Attendance: 40,758 (1,600 away); Referee: Tony Harrington |
Note: Live on Sky Sports

| 2 October 2022 9 | Leeds United | 0–0 | Aston Villa | Beeston, Leeds |
| 16:30 BST | Sinisterra (yellow card) 26' (yellow-red card) 48'; Roca (yellow card) 35'; Rodrigo (yellow card) 39'; Koch (yellow card) 83' | Report | Augustinsson (yellow card) 6'; Bailey (yellow card) 64' | Stadium: Elland Road; Attendance: 36,582 (2,913 away); Referee: Stuart Attwell |
Note: Live on Sky Sports

| 10 October 2022 10 | Nottingham Forest | 1–1 | Aston Villa | West Bridgford |
| 20:00 BST | Dennis 15'; Aurier (yellow card) 18'; Cook (yellow card) 27'; Yates (yellow card) 82' | Report | Young 22'; Konsa (yellow card) 45'; McGinn (yellow card) 50'; Ramsey (yellow card) 75' | Stadium: The City Ground; Attendance: 29,208 (2,941 away); Referee: Anthony Taylor |
Note: Live on Sky Sports

| 16 October 2022 11 | Aston Villa | 0–2 | Chelsea | Aston, Birmingham |
| 14:00 BST | | Report | Mount 6', 65', (yellow card) 83'; Chilwell (yellow card) 33'; Koulibaly (yellow card) 61' | Stadium: Villa Park; Attendance: 41,754 (2,961 away); Referee: Robert Jones |
Note: Live on Sky Sports

| 20 October 2022 12 | Fulham | 3–0 | Aston Villa | Fulham |
| 19:30 BST | Reed 36'; Mitrović 68' (pen.); Mings 83' (o.g.) | Report | Bailey (yellow card) 57'; Mings (yellow card) 60'; Douglas Luiz (red card) 62' (revoked) (Note: On 20 October 2022, Douglas Luiz was shown a red card during a match against Fulham, however, this was revoked by The FA the following day, after an appeal.) | Stadium: Craven Cottage; Attendance: 23,508 (2,299 away); Referee: Michael Oliver |
Note: Live on Amazon Prime Video

| 23 October 2022 13 | Aston Villa | 4–0 | Brentford | Aston, Birmingham |
| 14:00 BST | Bailey 2'; Ings 7', 14' (pen.), (yellow card) 35'; Watkins 59' | Report | | Stadium: Villa Park; Attendance: 41,693 (2,758 away); Referee: Darren England |

| 29 October 2022 14 | Newcastle United | 4–0 | Aston Villa | Newcastle upon Tyne |
| 15:00 BST | Wilson 46+6' (pen.), 56'; Joelinton 59', (yellow card) 65'; Almirón 67' | Report | Watkins (yellow card) 45+5' | Stadium: St James' Park; Attendance: 52,233 (3,209 away); Referee: Paul Tierney |

| 6 November 2022 15 | Aston Villa | 3–1 | Manchester United | Aston, Birmingham |
| 14:00 GMT | Bailey 7', (yellow card) 42'; Digne 11'; Ramsey 49'; Mings (yellow card) 61'; Martínez (yellow card) 88' | Report | Shaw (yellow card) 10'; Ramsey 45' (o.g.); Ronaldo (yellow card) 61'; Dalot (yellow card) 72' | Stadium: Villa Park; Attendance: 42,058 (2,961 away); Referee: Anthony Taylor |

| 13 November 2022 16 | Brighton & Hove Albion | 1–2 | Aston Villa | Falmer |
| 14:00 GMT | Mac Allister 1'; Caicedo (yellow card) 57'; Groß (yellow card) 82' | Report | Ings 20' (pen.), 54'; Mings (yellow card) 26'; Cash (yellow card) 79'; Bailey (yellow card) 80'; Young (yellow card) 84'; Kamara (yellow card) 85'; Martínez (yellow card) 90+8'; McGinn (yellow card) 90+8' | Stadium: Amex Stadium; Attendance: 31,581 (3,115 away); Referee: Chris Kavanagh |

| 26 December 2022 17 | Aston Villa | 1–3 | Liverpool | Aston, Birmingham |
| 17:30 GMT | Watkins 59' | Report | Salah 5'; Van Dijk 37'; Bajcetic 81' | Stadium: Villa Park; Attendance: 42,085 (2,999 away); Referee: Paul Tierney |
Note: Live on Amazon Prime Video

| 1 January 2023 18 | Tottenham Hotspur | 0–2 | Aston Villa | Tottenham |
| 14:00 GMT | Romero (yellow card) 28'; Lenglet (yellow card) 31'; Davies (yellow card) 37'; Bissouma (yellow card) 59' | Report | Buendía 50'; Mings (yellow card) 56'; Konsa (yellow card) 66'; Douglas Luiz 73'; Chambers (yellow card) 90+3' | Stadium: Tottenham Hotspur Stadium; Attendance: 61,651 (3,038 away); Referee: John Brooks |
Note: Live on Sky Sports

| 4 January 2023 19 | Aston Villa | 1–1 | Wolverhampton Wanderers | Aston, Birmingham |
| 20:00 GMT | Ings 78'; Coutinho (yellow card) 82' | Report | Podence 12'; Hwang (yellow card) 36'; Kilman (yellow card) 45+1'; Costa (yellow card) 52' | Stadium: Villa Park; Attendance: 39,978 (2,999 away); Referee: Jarred Gillett |

| 13 January 2023 20 | Aston Villa | 2–1 | Leeds United | Aston, Birmingham |
| 20:00 GMT | Bailey 3'; Kamara (yellow card) 63'; Buendía 64'; Martínez (yellow card) 90+2' | Report | Koch (yellow card) 33'; Bamford 83'; Meslier (yellow card) 89' | Stadium: Villa Park; Attendance: 42,008 (2,999 away); Referee: Michael Oliver |
Note: Live on Sky Sports

| 21 January 2023 21 | Southampton | 0–1 | Aston Villa | Southampton |
| 15:00 GMT | Lyanco (yellow card) 13' | Report | Douglas Luiz (yellow card) 64'; Watkins 77'; Moreno (yellow card) 82' | Stadium: St Mary's Stadium; Attendance: 30,158 (3,196 away); Referee: Michael Salisbury |

| 4 February 2023 22 | Aston Villa | 2–4 | Leicester City | Aston, Birmingham |
| 15:00 GMT | Watkins 9'; Souttar 32' (o.g.) | Report | Maddison 12'; Iheanacho 41'; Tetê 45+2'; Castagne (yellow card) 56'; Praet 79'; Söyüncü (yellow card) 86'; Tielemans (yellow card) 88' | Stadium: Villa Park; Attendance: 42,055 (2,999 away); Referee: Darren England |

| 12 February 2023 23 | Manchester City | 3–1 | Aston Villa | Manchester |
| 16:30 GMT | Rodri 4'; Gündoğan 39'; Dias (yellow card) 41'; Mahrez 45+1' (pen.) | Report | Digne (yellow card) 37'; Watkins 61'; Konsa (yellow card) 63' | Stadium: Etihad Stadium; Attendance: 53,392 (3,065 away); Referee: Robert Jones |
Note: Live on Sky Sports

| 18 February 2023 24 | Aston Villa | 2–4 | Arsenal | Aston, Birmingham |
| 12:30 GMT | Watkins 5'; Coutinho 31'; Douglas Luiz (yellow card) 45+3'; Martínez (yellow card) 83' | Report | Saka 16', (yellow card) 45+3'; Zinchenko 61'; Martínez 90+3' (o.g.); Martinelli 90+8' | Stadium: Villa Park; Attendance: 42,066 (2,999 away); Referee: Simon Hooper |
Note: Live on BT Sport

| 25 February 2023 25 | Everton | 0–2 | Aston Villa | Walton, Liverpool |
| 15:00 GMT | Onana (yellow card) 2'; Doucouré (yellow card) 75' | Report | Watkins 63' (pen.); Martínez (yellow card) 77'; Buendía 81' | Stadium: Goodison Park; Attendance: 39,309 (2,972 away); Referee: Anthony Taylor |

| 4 March 2023 26 | Aston Villa | 1–0 | Crystal Palace | Aston, Birmingham |
| 15:00 GMT | Andersen 27' (o.g.); Moreno (yellow card) 66'; Douglas Luiz (yellow card) 80' | Report | Doucouré (yellow card) 57' (yellow-red card) 62'; Eze (yellow card) 69'; Ahamada (yellow card) 82'; Zaha (yellow card) 87' | Stadium: Villa Park; Attendance: 41,893 (2,973 away); Referee: Craig Pawson |

| 12 March 2023 27 | West Ham United | 1–1 | Aston Villa | Stratford |
| 14:00 GMT | Benrahma 26' (pen.); Paquetá (yellow card) 70' | Report | Watkins 17' | Stadium: London Stadium; Attendance: 62,472 (3,001 away); Referee: Chris Kavanagh |

| 18 March 2023 28 | Aston Villa | 3–0 | Bournemouth | Aston, Birmingham |
| 15:00 GMT | Douglas Luiz 7'; McGinn (yellow card) 36'; Ramsey 80'; Buendía 89' | Report | Billing (yellow card) 14'; Lerma (yellow card) 58'; Senesi (yellow card) 66'; Stephens (yellow card) 79' | Stadium: Villa Park; Attendance: 41,021 (1,592 away); Referee: Robert Jones |

| 1 April 2023 29 | Chelsea | 0–2 | Aston Villa | Fulham |
| 17:30 BST | Kovačić (yellow card) 39'; Chilwell (yellow card) 54'; Fernández (yellow card) 68' | Report | Kamara (yellow card) 4'; Watkins 18'; McGinn 56'; Chambers (yellow card) 84'; Digne (yellow card) 90+3' | Stadium: Stamford Bridge; Attendance: 40,082 (2,986 away); Referee: Andrew Madley |
Note: Live on Sky Sports

| 4 April 2023 7 | Leicester City | 1–2 | Aston Villa | Leicester |
| 19:45 BST | Barnes 35'; Castagne (yellow card) 54'; Dewsbury-Hall (yellow card) 64' (yellow-red card) 70'; Faes (yellow card) 89' | Report | Watkins 24'; Traoré 87' | Stadium: King Power Stadium; Attendance: 32,087 (3,305 away); Referee: Graham Scott |
Note: The match was originally scheduled for 10 September 2022, but was postponed as a mark of respect following the passing of Queen Elizabeth II.

| 8 April 2023 30 | Aston Villa | 2–0 | Nottingham Forest | Aston, Birmingham |
| 15:00 BST | Moreno (yellow card) 35'; Traoré 48'; Konsa (yellow card) 85'; Watkins 90+5' (yellow card) 90+6' | Report | Shelvey (yellow card) 36'; Awoniyi (yellow card) 85'; Mangala (yellow card) 89'; Toffolo (yellow card) 90+1' | Stadium: Villa Park; Attendance: 42,076 (3,005 away); Referee: Anthony Taylor |

| 15 April 2023 31 | Aston Villa | 3–0 | Newcastle United | Aston, Birmingham |
| 12:30 BST | Ramsey 11'; Watkins 63', 83'; Durán (yellow card) 90+3' | Report | Schär (yellow card) 22' | Stadium: Villa Park; Attendance: 42,055 (3,000 away); Referee: John Brooks |
Note: Live on BT Sport

| 22 April 2023 32 | Brentford | 1–1 | Aston Villa | Brentford |
| 15:00 BST | Nørgaard (yellow card) 23'; Schade (yellow card) 55'; Toney 65'; Janelt (yellow card) 71' | Report | Young (yellow card) 29'; Douglas Luiz (yellow card) 70', (goal) 87' | Stadium: Brentford Community Stadium; Attendance: 17,098 (1,725 away); Referee: Michael Salisbury |

| 25 April 2023 33 | Aston Villa | 1–0 | Fulham | Aston, Birmingham |
| 19:45 BST | Mings 21'; Young (yellow card) 74'; Martínez (yellow card) 88'; Traoré (yellow card) 89' | Report | Decordova-Reid (yellow card) 45+2'; Palhinha (yellow card) 79' | Stadium: Villa Park; Attendance: 41,046 (1,287 away); Referee: Thomas Bramall |
Note: Live on BT Sport

| 30 April 2023 34 | Manchester United | 1–0 | Aston Villa | Trafford |
| 14:00 BST | Fernandes 39'; Fred (yellow card) 87'; Malacia (yellow card) 90+5' | Report | | Stadium: Old Trafford; Attendance: 73,592 (3,094 away); Referee: Jarred Gillett |

| 6 May 2023 35 | Wolverhampton Wanderers | 1–0 | Aston Villa | Wolverhampton |
| 15:00 BST | Toti 9', (yellow card) 82'; Costa (yellow card) 39'; Semedo (yellow card) 90+2' | Report | Mings (yellow card) 39'; Watkins (yellow card) 63'; Douglas Luiz (yellow card) 75' | Stadium: Molineux Stadium; Attendance: 31,641 (2,970 away); Referee: Stuart Attwell |

| 13 May 2023 36 | Aston Villa | 2–1 | Tottenham Hotspur | Aston, Birmingham |
| 15:00 BST | Ramsey 8'; McGinn (yellow card) 23'; Douglas Luiz 72'; Young (yellow card) 89'; Watkins (yellow card) 90+1' | Report | Skipp (yellow card) 53'; Kane (yellow card) 73', (goal) 90' (pen.); Romero (yellow card) 80' | Stadium: Villa Park; Attendance: 42,164 (3,005 away); Referee: Peter Bankes |

| 20 May 2023 37 | Liverpool | 1–1 | Aston Villa | Anfield, Liverpool |
| 15:00 BST | Konaté (yellow card) 20'; Alexander-Arnold (yellow card) 66'; Fabinho (yellow card) 80'; Firmino 89' | Report | Watkins (penalty missed) 22'; Ramsey 27'; Mings (yellow card) 45'; Digne (yellow card) 53'; Martínez (yellow card) 77'; Young (yellow card) 90+1'; Konsa (yellow card) 90+6' | Stadium: Anfield; Attendance: 53,306 (2,936 away); Referee: John Brooks |

| 28 May 2023 38 | Aston Villa | 2–1 | Brighton & Hove Albion | Aston, Birmingham |
| 16:30 BST | Douglas Luiz 8'; Cash (yellow card) 22'; Ramsey (yellow card) 24'; Watkins 26'; Mings (yellow card) 37'; McGinn (yellow card) 67' | Report | Undav (yellow card) 12', (goal) 38'; Buonanotte (yellow card) 63'; Caicedo (yellow card) 73'; Groß (yellow card) 88' | Stadium: Villa Park; Attendance: 42,212 (2,999 away); Referee: David Coote |

=== FA Cup ===
The Villans joined the competition in the third round and were drawn at home to Stevenage.

Win Draw Loss Fixtures

| 8 January 2023 Third round | Aston Villa | 1–2 | Stevenage | Aston, Birmingham |
| 16:30 GMT | Sanson 33'; Dendoncker (red card) 85' | Report | Reid 88' (pen.); Campbell 90' | Stadium: Villa Park; Attendance: 32,343; Referee: Graham Scott |

=== EFL Cup ===
Aston Villa entered the EFL Cup in the second round and were drawn away to Bolton Wanderers.

Win Draw Loss Fixtures

| 23 August 2022 Second round | Bolton Wanderers | 1–4 | Aston Villa | Horwich |
| 19:45 BST | Johnston (yellow card) 13'; Charles 24'; Dixon (yellow card) 61'; Kachunga (yellow card) 62' | Report | Douglas Luiz 36', (yellow card) 62'; Ings 63' (pen.); Digne 66'; Bailey 87' | Stadium: University of Bolton Stadium; Attendance: 20,064; Referee: Andrew Kitchen |
Note: Live on Sky Sports

| 10 November 2022 Third round | Manchester United | 4–2 | Aston Villa | Manchester |
| 20:00 GMT | McTominay (yellow card) 40', (goal) 90+1'; Maguire (yellow card) 43'; Martial 49'; Fernandes (yellow card) 52', (goal) 78'; Rashford 67' | Report | Watkins 48'; Douglas Luiz (yellow card) 52'; Young (yellow card) 54'; Dalot 61' (o.g.); Bailey (yellow card) 90+3' | Stadium: Old Trafford; Attendance: 72,512; Referee: David Coote |
Note: Live on Sky Sports

== Squad statistics ==
=== Appearances and goals ===
| No. | Pos | Nat | Player | Total | | Premier League | | FA Cup | | EFL Cup | | Other | |
| No. | Pos | Nat | Player | Apps | Goals | Apps | Goals | Apps | Goals | Apps | Goals | Apps | Goals |
Goalkeepers
| 1 | GK | (Argentina) ARG | Emiliano Martínez | 37 | 0 | 36 | 0 | 0 | 0 | 1 | 0 | 0 | 0 |
| 12 | GK | (England) ENG | Jed Steer | 0 | 0 | 0 | 0 | 0 | 0 | 0 | 0 | 0 | 0 |
| 25 | GK | (Sweden) SWE | Robin Olsen | 6 | 0 | 2+2 | 0 | 1 | 0 | 1 | 0 | 0 | 0 |
| 38 | GK | (Finland) FIN | Viljami Sinisalo | 0 | 0 | 0 | 0 | 0 | 0 | 0 | 0 | 0 | 0 |
Defenders
| 2 | DF | (Poland) POL | Matty Cash | 28 | 0 | 20+6 | 0 | 1 | 0 | 0+1 | 0 | 0 | 0 |
| 3 | DF | (Brazil) BRA | Diego Carlos | 3 | 0 | 2+1 | 0 | 0 | 0 | 0 | 0 | 0 | 0 |
| 4 | DF | (England) ENG | Ezri Konsa | 39 | 0 | 37+1 | 0 | 0 | 0 | 1 | 0 | 0 | 0 |
| 5 | DF | (England) ENG | Tyrone Mings | 37 | 1 | 35 | 1 | 0 | 0 | 1+1 | 0 | 0 | 0 |
| 15 | DF | (Spain) ESP | Álex Moreno | 19 | 0 | 14+5 | 0 | 0 | 0 | 0 | 0 | 0 | 0 |
| 16 | DF | (England) ENG | Calum Chambers | 17 | 0 | 2+12 | 0 | 1 | 0 | 2 | 0 | 0 | 0 |
| 18 | DF | (England) ENG | Ashley Young | 32 | 1 | 23+6 | 1 | 0+1 | 0 | 2 | 0 | 0 | 0 |
| 27 | DF | (France) FRA | Lucas Digne | 31 | 2 | 18+10 | 1 | 0+1 | 0 | 1+1 | 1 | 0 | 0 |
| 29 | DF | (England) ENG | Kaine Kesler-Hayden | 0 | 0 | 0 | 0 | 0 | 0 | 0 | 0 | 0 | 0 |
| 50 | DF | (Netherlands) NED | Sil Swinkels | 0 | 0 | 0 | 0 | 0 | 0 | 0 | 0 | 0 | 0 |
Midfielders
| 6 | MF | (Brazil) BRA | Douglas Luiz | 40 | 7 | 33+4 | 6 | 1 | 0 | 2 | 1 | 0 | 0 |
| 7 | MF | (Scotland) SCO | John McGinn | 36 | 1 | 30+4 | 1 | 0 | 0 | 2 | 0 | 0 | 0 |
| 10 | MF | (Argentina) ARG | Emiliano Buendía | 41 | 5 | 27+11 | 5 | 0+1 | 0 | 0+2 | 0 | 0 | 0 |
| 23 | MF | (Brazil) BRA | Philippe Coutinho | 22 | 1 | 7+13 | 1 | 1 | 0 | 1 | 0 | 0 | 0 |
| 32 | MF | (Belgium) BEL | Leander Dendoncker | 21 | 0 | 7+13 | 0 | 1 | 0 | 0 | 0 | 0 | 0 |
| 41 | MF | (England) ENG | Jacob Ramsey | 38 | 6 | 31+4 | 6 | 0+1 | 0 | 1+1 | 0 | 0 | 0 |
| 44 | MF | (France) FRA | Boubacar Kamara | 26 | 0 | 21+3 | 0 | 0 | 0 | 2 | 0 | 0 | 0 |
Forwards
| 9 | FW | (Burkina Faso) BFA | Bertrand Traoré | 8 | 2 | 1+7 | 2 | 0 | 0 | 0 | 0 | 0 | 0 |
| 11 | FW | (England) ENG | Ollie Watkins | 40 | 16 | 36+1 | 15 | 0+1 | 0 | 2 | 1 | 0 | 0 |
| 22 | FW | (Colombia) COL | Jhon Durán | 12 | 0 | 0+12 | 0 | 0 | 0 | 0 | 0 | 0 | 0 |
| 31 | FW | (Jamaica) JAM | Leon Bailey | 36 | 5 | 26+7 | 4 | 1 | 0 | 0+2 | 1 | 0 | 0 |
| 43 | FW | (England) ENG | Brad Young | 0 | 0 | 0 | 0 | 0 | 0 | 0 | 0 | 0 | 0 |
Players transferred or loaned out during the season
| 8 | MF | (France) FRA | Morgan Sanson | 3 | 1 | 0+2 | 0 | 1 | 1 | 0 | 0 | 0 | 0 |
| 9 | FW | (England) ENG | Danny Ings | 21 | 7 | 8+10 | 6 | 1 | 0 | 2 | 1 | 0 | 0 |
| 17 | DF | (Sweden) SWE | Ludwig Augustinsson | 5 | 0 | 1+2 | 0 | 1 | 0 | 1 | 0 | 0 | 0 |
| 20 | DF | (Poland) POL | Jan Bednarek | 4 | 0 | 1+2 | 0 | 1 | 0 | 0 | 0 | 0 | 0 |
| 35 | FW | (England) ENG | Cameron Archer | 7 | 0 | 0+6 | 0 | 0 | 0 | 0+1 | 0 | 0 | 0 |
| 47 | MF | (England) ENG | Tim Iroegbunam | 1 | 0 | 0 | 0 | 0 | 0 | 0+1 | 0 | 0 | 0 |

=== Goals ===
As of match played 28 May 2023

| Rank | Pos. | No. | Player | Premier League | FA Cup | EFL Cup | Total |
|---|---|---|---|---|---|---|---|
| 1 | CF | 11 | (England) Ollie Watkins | 15 | 0 | 1 | 16 |
| 2 | CM | 6 | (Brazil) Douglas Luiz | 6 | 0 | 1 | 7 |
| 2 | CF | 9 | (England) Danny Ings | 6 | 0 | 1 | 7 |
| 3 | CM | 41 | (England) Jacob Ramsey | 6 | 0 | 0 | 6 |
| 4 | CAM | 10 | (Argentina) Emiliano Buendía | 5 | 0 | 0 | 5 |
| 4 | RW | 31 | (Jamaica) Leon Bailey | 4 | 0 | 1 | 5 |
| 5 | RW | 9 | (Burkina Faso) Bertrand Traoré | 2 | 0 | 0 | 2 |
| 5 | LB | 27 | (France) Lucas Digne | 1 | 0 | 1 | 2 |
| 6 | CB | 5 | (England) Tyrone Mings | 1 | 0 | 0 | 1 |
| 6 | CM | 7 | (Scotland) John McGinn | 1 | 0 | 0 | 1 |
| 6 | CM | 8 | (France) Morgan Sanson | 0 | 1 | 0 | 1 |
| 6 | RB | 18 | (England) Ashley Young | 1 | 0 | 0 | 1 |
| 6 | CAM | 23 | (Brazil) Philippe Coutinho | 1 | 0 | 0 | 1 |
| Own Goals | | | | 2 | 0 | 1 | 3 |
| Total | | | | 51 | 1 | 6 | 58 |

=== Assists ===
Not all goals have an assist.

As of match played 28 May 2023

| Rank | Pos. | No. | Player | Premier League | FA Cup | EFL Cup | Total |
|---|---|---|---|---|---|---|---|
| 1 | CM | 41 | (England) Jacob Ramsey | 7 | 0 | 1 | 8 |
| 2 | CM | 6 | (Brazil) Douglas Luiz | 6 | 0 | 0 | 6 |
| 2 | CF | 11 | (England) Ollie Watkins | 6 | 0 | 0 | 6 |
| 3 | RW | 31 | (Jamaica) Leon Bailey | 4 | 0 | 0 | 4 |
| 4 | CM | 7 | (Scotland) John McGinn | 3 | 0 | 0 | 3 |
| 4 | CAM | 10 | (Argentina) Emiliano Buendía | 2 | 0 | 1 | 3 |
| 4 | LB | 15 | (Spain) Álex Moreno | 3 | 0 | 0 | 3 |
| 5 | CB | 5 | (England) Tyrone Mings | 2 | 0 | 0 | 2 |
| 5 | CF | 9 | (England) Danny Ings | 0 | 1 | 1 | 2 |
| 6 | RB | 2 | (Poland) Matty Cash | 1 | 0 | 0 | 1 |
| 6 | CDM | 44 | (France) Boubacar Kamara | 1 | 0 | 0 | 1 |
| Total | | | | 35 | 1 | 3 | 39 |

=== Clean sheets ===
As of match played 28 May 2023

| Rank | No. | Player | Premier League | FA Cup | EFL Cup | Total |
|---|---|---|---|---|---|---|
| 1 | 1 | (Argentina) Emiliano Martínez | 11 | 0 | 0 | 11 |
| 2 | 25 | (Sweden) Robin Olsen | 1 | 0 | 0 | 1 |
| Total | | | 12 | 0 | 0 | 12 |

=== Disciplinary record ===
As of match played 20 May 2023

| Rank | Pos. | No. | Name | Premier League | | FA Cup | | EFL Cup | | Total | |
| Rank | Pos. | No. | Name | Yellow card | Red card | Yellow card | Red card | Yellow card | Red card | Yellow card | Red card |
|---|---|---|---|---|---|---|---|---|---|---|---|
| 1 | CDM | 32 | (Belgium) Leander Dendoncker | 0 | 0 | 0 | 1 | 0 | 0 | 0 | 1 |
| 2 | CM | 6 | (Brazil) Douglas Luiz | 6 | 0 | 0 | 0 | 2 | 0 | 8 | 0 |
| 2 | RB | 18 | (England) Ashley Young | 7 | 0 | 0 | 0 | 1 | 0 | 8 | 0 |
| 3 | GK | 1 | (Argentina) Emiliano Martínez | 7 | 0 | 0 | 0 | 0 | 0 | 7 | 0 |
| 3 | CB | 5 | (England) Tyrone Mings | 7 | 0 | 0 | 0 | 0 | 0 | 7 | 0 |
| 3 | CM | 7 | (Scotland) John McGinn | 7 | 0 | 0 | 0 | 0 | 0 | 7 | 0 |
| 4 | CB | 4 | (England) Ezri Konsa | 6 | 0 | 0 | 0 | 0 | 0 | 6 | 0 |
| 5 | LB | 27 | (France) Lucas Digne | 5 | 0 | 0 | 0 | 0 | 0 | 5 | 0 |
| 5 | RW | 31 | (Jamaica) Leon Bailey | 4 | 0 | 0 | 0 | 1 | 0 | 5 | 0 |
| 5 | CM | 40 | (England) Jacob Ramsey | 5 | 0 | 0 | 0 | 0 | 0 | 5 | 0 |
| 6 | RB | 2 | (Poland) Matty Cash | 4 | 0 | 0 | 0 | 0 | 0 | 4 | 0 |
| 6 | CF | 11 | (England) Ollie Watkins | 4 | 0 | 0 | 0 | 0 | 0 | 4 | 0 |
| 6 | CDM | 44 | (France) Boubacar Kamara | 4 | 0 | 0 | 0 | 0 | 0 | 4 | 0 |
| 7 | CF | 9 | (England) Danny Ings | 3 | 0 | 0 | 0 | 0 | 0 | 3 | 0 |
| 7 | LB | 15 | (Spain) Álex Moreno | 3 | 0 | 0 | 0 | 0 | 0 | 3 | 0 |
| 7 | CAM | 23 | (Brazil) Philippe Coutinho | 3 | 0 | 0 | 0 | 0 | 0 | 3 | 0 |
| 8 | CB | 16 | (England) Calum Chambers | 2 | 0 | 0 | 0 | 0 | 0 | 2 | 0 |
| 9 | RW | 9 | (Burkina Faso) Bertrand Traoré | 1 | 0 | 0 | 0 | 0 | 0 | 1 | 0 |
| 9 | LB | 17 | (Sweden) Ludwig Augustinsson | 1 | 0 | 0 | 0 | 0 | 0 | 1 | 0 |
| 9 | CF | 22 | (Colombia) Jhon Durán | 1 | 0 | 0 | 0 | 0 | 0 | 1 | 0 |
| | | Total | | 80 | 0 | 0 | 1 | 4 | 0 | 84 | 1 |

== Club awards ==
=== Player of the Month award ===
Voted for by fans on Aston Villa's official website.

| Month | Player |
|---|---|
| August | Not Awarded |
| September | (England) Tyrone Mings |
| October | Not Awarded |
| November | (Jamaica) Leon Bailey |
| December | Not awarded due to World Cup break |
| January | (France) Boubacar Kamara |
| February | (England) Ollie Watkins |
| March | (Brazil) Douglas Luiz |
| April | (England) Ollie Watkins |
| May | (England) Jacob Ramsey |

=== Goal of the Month award ===
Voted for by fans on Aston Villa's Twitter account.

| Month | Player | Competition | Opponent |
|---|---|---|---|
| August | Not awarded | | |
| September | Not awarded | | |
| October | (England) Ashley Young | Premier League | Nottingham Forest |
| November | (France) Lucas Digne | Premier League | Manchester United |
| December | Not awarded due to World Cup break. | | |
| January | (Brazil) Douglas Luiz | Premier League | Tottenham Hotspur |
| February | (Brazil) Philippe Coutinho | Premier League | Arsenal |
| March | (England) Ollie Watkins | Premier League | West Ham United |
| April | (Burkina Faso) Bertrand Traoré | Premier League | Leicester City |
| May | (Brazil) Douglas Luiz | Premier League | Tottenham Hotspur |

=== End of Season awards ===
| Award | Winner |
|---|---|
| Supporter's Player of the Season | (Brazil) Douglas Luiz |
| Player's Player of the Season | (Brazil) Douglas Luiz |
| Young Player of the Season | (England) Jacob Ramsey |
| Goal of the Season | (Burkina Faso) Bertrand Traoré (vs. Leicester City, 4 April 2023) |
