= Matty Cash =

Footballer (born 1997)

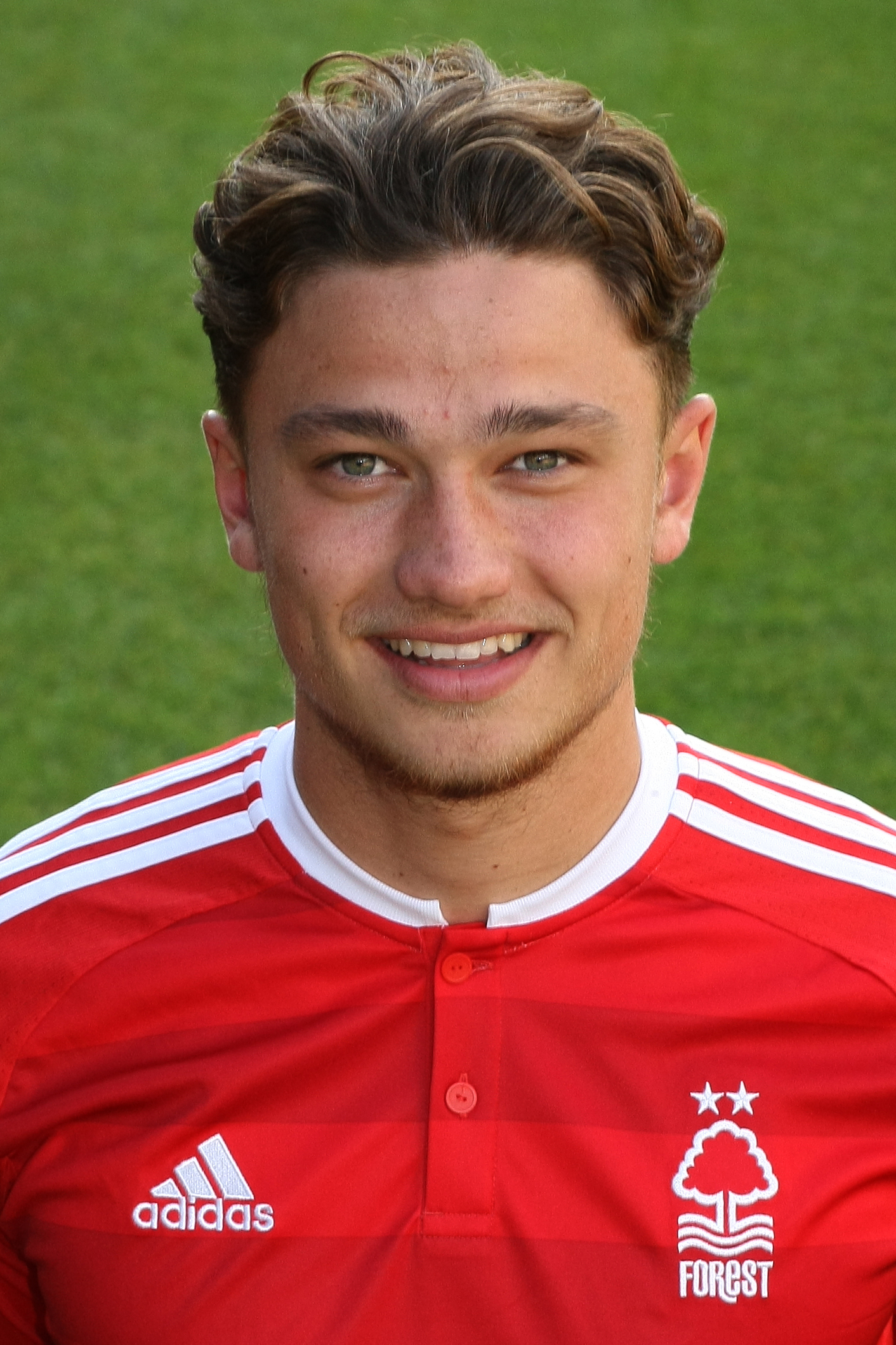
- Cash with Nottingham Forest in 2016

Personal information
- Full name: Matthew Stuart Cash
- Date of birth: 7 August 1997 (age 29)
- Place of birth: Slough, Berkshire, England
- Height: 6 ft 1 in (1.85 m)
- Position: Right-back

Team information
- Current team: Aston Villa
- Number: 2

Youth career
- 2010–2012: Wycombe Wanderers
- 2013–2014: FAB Academy
- 2014–2016: Nottingham Forest

Senior career*
Years	Team	Apps	(Gls)
2016–2020	Nottingham Forest	129	(11)
2016	→ Dagenham & Redbridge (loan)	12	(3)
2020–	Aston Villa	191	(10)

International career^{‡}
2021–	Poland	30	(4)
- * Club domestic league appearances and goals as of 1 November 2026 ‡ National team caps and goals as of 14 November 2026

Matthew Stuart Cash (born 7 August 1997) is a professional footballer who plays as a right-back for Premier League club Aston Villa. Born in England, he plays for the Poland national team.

Cash started his career at Wycombe Wanderers and later the FAB Academy before he signed his first professional contract with Nottingham Forest and then established himself as a regular at right-back. He signed for Aston Villa in September 2020.

Cash made his debut for Poland in November 2021, and represented them at the 2022 FIFA World Cup.

== Club career ==
=== Nottingham Forest ===
Cash signed with Nottingham Forest in October 2014, after spending 16-months with the FAB Football Academy based at Bisham Abbey. Cash had joined FAB after Wycombe Wanderers released him, due to financial problems forcing their youth teams to be disbanded, aged fourteen. He experienced his first games in professional football on loan at League Two club Dagenham & Redbridge, having joined them on 4 March 2016 on a one-month loan deal. He scored his first goal for the Daggers in a 3–1 defeat to Hartlepool United on 12 March 2016.

On 5 August 2016, Cash signed a three-year deal with Forest to keep him at the club until 2019. He made his first team debut a day later, starting in a 4–3 win over Burton Albion. Cash's early season form earned him praise, with former Forest defender Kenny Burns claiming that the midfielder's performances were putting those of some of the more experienced Forest players "to shame". However, on only his fifth appearance for Forest, Cash sustained a fracture to his tibia at the beginning of a 2–2 draw away to Aston Villa on 11 September 2016 which was expected to keep him out for three months.

Cash made his return from injury on 25 November as a 79th-minute substitute in a 5–2 defeat of Barnsley at Oakwell. Three days later Cash was linked with a £5 million transfer to Premier League side Chelsea, although Forest owner Fawaz Al-Hasawi subsequently took to social media to deny that the midfielder would be sold in the January transfer window.

On 4 January 2017, Cash was the subject of a £6 million bid from Bundesliga side RB Leipzig. Having remained at Forest upon the closure of the January transfer window, Cash signed a new contract on 3 March 2017 to extend his current deal with the club until 2021.

Having changed squad number from 41 to 14, ankle ligament damage sustained during a pre-season friendly match with Girona deprived Cash of starting the first match of the 2017–18 season, with the injury reported to sideline the player for "around three months". He scored his first goal for Forest in a 5–2 win at Queens Park Rangers on 24 February 2018.

Cash scored the opening goal for Nottingham Forest in the 2019–20 season, in a 2–1 defeat against West Bromwich Albion. During the season, Forest manager Sabri Lamouchi began to utilise Cash as a right back, after injuries to Tendayi Darikwa and later Carl Jenkinson. He made the right-back position his own, and his impressive performances led to the Poland national team reportedly monitoring his progress ahead of a potential call-up. He signed a three-and-a-half-year contract extension with Forest in November 2019.

In January 2020, a number of clubs including Milan, Everton and West Ham were interested in signing Cash. However, Cash said that he wished to stay at Forest until the end of the season in the hope that he could help the team to secure promotion to the Premier League. He cited Aston Villa's Jack Grealish as an influence behind this decision.

Cash was named Forest's Player of the Season by the club's supporters on 12 August 2020.

=== Aston Villa ===
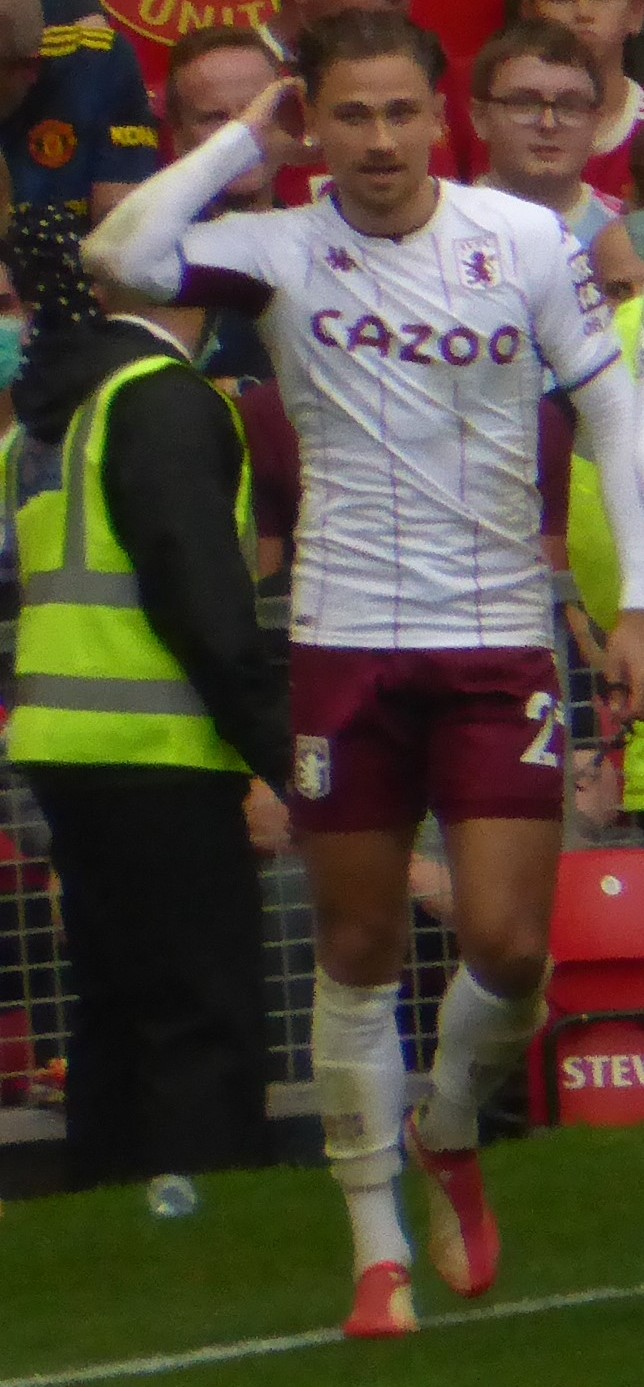
Cash with Aston Villa in 2021

On 3 September 2020, Aston Villa announced the signing of 23-year-old Cash on a five-year contract for a reported £14 million, rising to £16 million. Cash made his debut for the club on 21 September, in a 1–0 home victory against Sheffield United. On 18 September 2021, Cash scored his first goal for Aston Villa in a 3–0 Premier League victory over Everton.

On 26 February 2022, Cash scored a long-range effort in an away victory over Brighton & Hove Albion which was nominated for Premier League Goal of the Month. He received a yellow card for his celebration of the goal, in which Cash lifted his shirt to reveal a message of support for Poland teammate Tomasz Kędziora and his family, who were in Kyiv during the 2022 Russian invasion of Ukraine. Cash was voted Villa's player of the month for March 2022. On 4 April 2022, Cash signed a five-year contract extension with Aston Villa, amidst reported interest from Atlético Madrid. On 12 May 2022, at Aston Villa's End of Season awards, Cash was voted Villa's Player of the Season for the 2021–22 season.

On 27 August 2023, Cash made his 100th appearance for Aston Villa, in which he scored two goals in the first 20 minutes to help his team to a 3–1 away win at Burnley. On 6 January 2024, he scored the only goal in a 1–0 victory over Middlesbrough in the FA Cup to give his side their first win in the competition since 2016.

On 27 October 2025, Cash signed a contract extension with Aston Villa until 2029, this was following a back-to-back Premier League Player of the Match awards in victories over Tottenham Hotspur and Manchester City, in the latter of which he scored the winning goal.

== International career ==
Cash is of Polish descent through his mother, born in the UK from Polish parents. In September 2021, Cash applied for a Polish passport. His application for confirmation of possession of Polish citizenship was signed on 26 October 2021 at the Masovian Voivodeship government building in Warsaw. On 1 November, Cash received his first call-up to the Poland national football team for their 2022 FIFA World Cup qualification matches against Andorra and Hungary. The 24-year-old made his first appearance in a 4–1 away victory against Andorra on 12 November. On 11 June 2022, Cash scored his first international goal in a 2–2 away UEFA Nations League draw against the Netherlands.

== Personal life ==
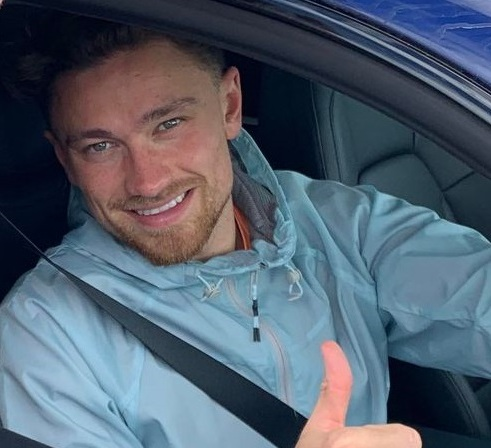
Cash in 2023

Cash is the son of former professional footballer Stuart Cash. His brother Adam coaches football at school-level. He has a sister, Hannah, who works as a reporter in the United States for CBS Sports. She interviewed her brother after the Aston Villa match against Paris Saint-Germain during the Champions League quarter-final first leg. His maternal grandfather was Ryszard Tomaszewski, a Polish refugee from Soviet captivity in World War II, and his grandmother was Janina, born in Brańsk in Poland and later emigrated to Britain.

Cash grew up in Iver, Buckinghamshire, working in a branch of the department store Daniel prior to joining the Nottingham Forest academy. He attended St Joseph's Catholic High School, Slough, and has donated a shirt to the school as well as presenting end-of-year awards to students.

He enjoys playing snooker and has appeared on Stephen Hendry's Cue Tips YouTube channel.

== Career statistics ==
=== Club ===
As of match played 3 November 2026

Appearances and goals by club, season and competition
Club	Season	League			FA Cup		EFL Cup		Europe		Other		Total	
Club	Season	Division	Apps	Goals	Apps	Goals	Apps	Goals	Apps	Goals	Apps	Goals	Apps	Goals
Nottingham Forest	2015–16	Championship	0	0	0	0	0	0	—		—		0	0
Nottingham Forest	2016–17	Championship	28	0	1	0	1	0	—		—		30	0
Nottingham Forest	2017–18	Championship	23	2	2	0	0	0	—		—		25	2
Nottingham Forest	2018–19	Championship	36	6	1	0	4	2	—		—		41	8
Nottingham Forest	2019–20	Championship	42	3	0	0	3	0	—		—		45	3
Nottingham Forest	Total		129	11	4	0	8	2	—		—		141	13
Dagenham & Redbridge (loan)	2015–16	League Two	12	3	—		—		—		—		12	3
Aston Villa	2020–21	Premier League	28	0	0	0	0	0	—		—		28	0
Aston Villa	2021–22	Premier League	38	4	1	0	1	0	—		—		40	4
Aston Villa	2022–23	Premier League	26	0	1	0	1	0	—		—		28	0
Aston Villa	2023–24	Premier League	29	2	3	1	1	0	13 (Note: Appearances in UEFA Europa Conference League)	2	—		46	5
Aston Villa	2024–25	Premier League	27	1	3	0	0	0	8 (Note: Appearances in UEFA Champions League)	0	—		38	1
Aston Villa	2025–26	Premier League	35	3	1	0	1	0	12 (Note: Appearances in UEFA Europa League)	0	—		49	3
Aston Villa	2026–27	Premier League	8	0	0	0	0	0	3	0	1 (Note: Appearance in UEFA Super Cup)	0	12	0
Aston Villa	Total		191	10	9	1	4	0	36	2	1	0	241	13
Career total			332	24	13	1	12	2	36	2	1	0	394	29

=== International ===
As of match played 14 November 2026

Appearances and goals by national team and year
National team	Year	Apps	Goals
Poland	2021	2	0
Poland	2022	9	1
Poland	2023	3	0
Poland	2024	1	0
Poland	2025	8	3
Poland	2026	7	0
Total		30	4

As of match played 7 September 2025
Poland score listed first, score column indicates score after each Cash goal.

List of international goals scored by Matty Cash
No.	Date	Venue	Cap	Opponent	Score	Result	Competition	Ref.
1	11 June 2022	De Kuip, Rotterdam, Netherlands	6	Netherlands	1–0	2–2	2022–23 UEFA Nations League A	
2	6 June 2025	Silesian Stadium, Chorzów, Poland	18	Moldova	1–0	2–0	Friendly	
3	4 September 2025	De Kuip, Rotterdam, Netherlands	20	Netherlands	1–1	1–1	2026 FIFA World Cup qualification	
4	7 September 2025	Silesian Stadium, Chorzów, Poland	21	Finland	1–0	3–1	2026 FIFA World Cup qualification	

== Honours ==
Aston Villa

- UEFA Europa League: 2025–26

Individual

- Nottingham Forest Player of the Season: 2019–20
- Aston Villa Player of the Season: 2021–22
