= Jacob Ramsey =

English footballer (born 2001)

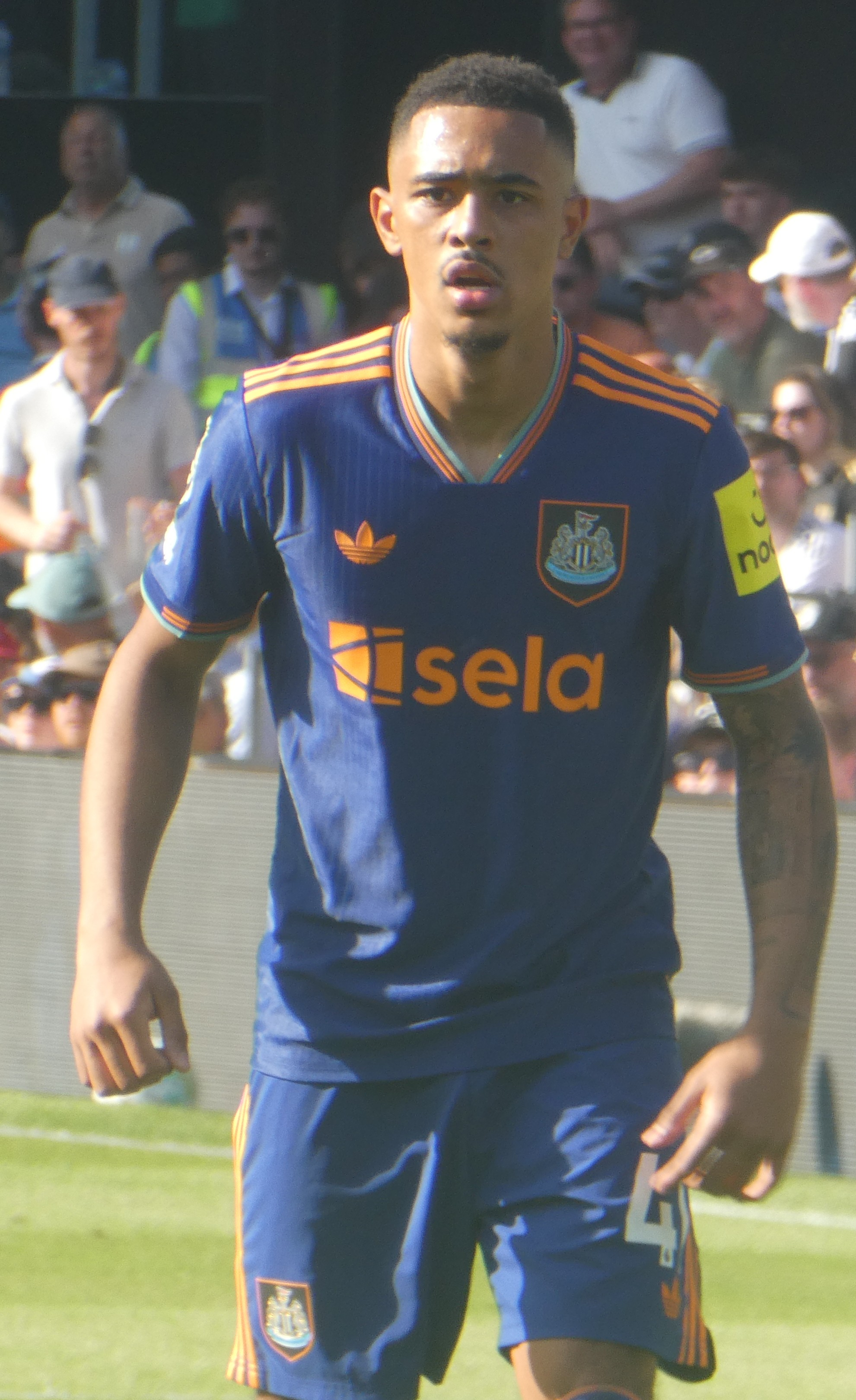
- Ramsey with Newcastle United in 2026

Personal information
- Full name: Jacob Matthew Decourcey Ramsey
- Date of birth: 28 May 2001 (age 25)
- Place of birth: Great Barr, Birmingham, England
- Height: 5 ft 11 in (1.80 m)
- Position: Attacking midfielder

Team information
- Current team: Newcastle United
- Number: 41

Youth career
- 2007–2019: Aston Villa

Senior career*
Years	Team	Apps	(Gls)
2019–2025	Aston Villa	137	(14)
2020	→ Doncaster Rovers (loan)	7	(3)
2025–	Newcastle United	31	(3)

International career
2019	England U18	7	(0)
2019	England U19	3	(0)
2020	England U20	1	(1)
2021–2023	England U21	16	(4)
Medal record
Representing England
UEFA European Under-21 Championship
Winner	2023 Georgia–Romania
- * Club domestic league appearances and goals as of 23:22, 5 September 2026 (UTC)

Jacob Matthew Decourcey Ramsey (born 28 May 2001) is an English professional footballer who plays as a midfielder for Premier League club Newcastle United.

Ramsey is a product of the Aston Villa Academy and made his senior debut for the club in a EFL Championship match in February 2019. He represented England at youth level and was a member of the under-21 squad in 2023.

== Club career ==
=== Aston Villa ===
Ramsey joined the youth academy of Aston Villa at the age of six. He was often among the smallest players in his age group in youth football and would supplement his football training with boxing training with his father, an ex-professional boxer, to build muscle.

On 15 January 2019, Ramsey signed a professional contract with Aston Villa. Ramsey caught national attention playing for Aston Villa U18s in the 2018–19 FA Youth Cup, scoring 2 goals in every round, until the Fifth Round. On 2 February 2019, Ramsey was given a straight red card less than ten minutes into Villa's Fifth Round defeat against AFC Bournemouth U18s. While suspended for the youth team, Ramsey joined first team training to "make up the numbers" during a spate of injuries. After training with the first team, 17-year-old Ramsey was selected by manager Dean Smith to be on the bench for a Championship game against Brentford on 13 February 2019 in which he was an unused substitute and then made his professional debut with Aston Villa as a 61st minute substitute in a 2–0 loss to West Bromwich Albion three days later.

On 1 May 2019, at the Aston Villa End-of-Season awards, Ramsey was named "2018–19 Academy Player of the Season".

On 31 January 2020, Ramsey signed for Doncaster Rovers on loan for the remainder of the 2019–20 season. On the same day, he signed a new three-and-a-half-year contract with Aston Villa. On 4 February 2020, Ramsey made his Doncaster debut, in a 3–0 away victory over Tranmere Rovers, in which he scored his first two goals in senior football. However, the EFL League One season was initially postponed and, on 9 June 2020, ended due to the COVID-19 pandemic in the United Kingdom and Ramsey re-joined the Aston Villa squad ahead of the resumption of the Premier League.

On 15 September 2020, after making substitute appearances against Brighton and Hove Albion and Fulham in the third round of both the previous seasons' domestic cup competitions, Ramsey was given his first ever start for Aston Villa, in a 3–1 victory over Burton Albion in the EFL Cup. On 28 September, the 19-year-old made his Premier League debut as a second-half substitute in a 3–0 away win over Fulham. On 12 December, he made his first league start for Villa in a 1–0 away win over West Midlands rivals Wolverhampton Wanderers.

On 9 February 2021, Ramsey signed a new four-and-a-half-year contract with the club.

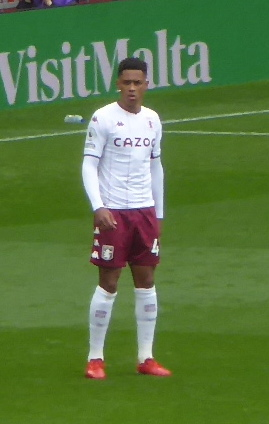
Ramsey playing for Aston Villa in 2021

On 22 October 2021, Ramsey scored his first goal for Aston Villa in the Premier League, a late consolation goal in a 3–1 defeat to Arsenal. Ramsey was voted Aston Villa's player of the month for December 2021 by fans, a month in which he scored his second Premier League goal – a solo run and finish in a 2–0 victory over Norwich City which was also voted goal of the month. On 15 January 2022, Ramsey scored his first goal at Villa Park against Manchester United. On 9 February, Ramsey scored two goals against Leeds United, marking his first Premier League brace. On 26 April 2022, Ramsey signed a contract extension with Aston Villa, lasting until 2027. On 12 May, at Villa's 2021–22 End Of Season awards, Ramsey was voted Young Player of the Season by supporters, and Player's Player of the Season by his teammates.

On 6 November 2022, Ramsey scored an own goal and for Villa in the same game, a 3–1 home victory over Manchester United. After a successful 2022–23 season, Ramsey was recognised by the Premier League with the "2022/23 Premier League Academy Graduate" award. At the Aston Villa end of season awards, Ramsey was named Young Player of the Season for the second season running.

Ramsey missed much of the 2023–24 season for Villa, making only 16 appearances (half of which he started), due to a hamstring injury in January and two foot injuries; a metatarsal fracture in July while playing for England's U21's which reoccurred in October, and a toe injury in a match against Luton Town in March. On 1 August 2024, Ramsey was confirmed to be fit ahead of the new season, featuring in a pre-season tour of the United States.

On 10 May 2025, Ramsey received the first red card of his senior career, for two bookable offences, in a 1–0 victory away at Bournemouth.

=== Newcastle United ===
On 17 August 2025, Ramsey signed for Newcastle United for an undisclosed fee, reported to be in the range of £40 million.

== International career ==
Ramsey was born in England to a Jamaican father and English mother. He represented the England U18s at the UAE Sports Chain Cup in March 2019 and the Slovakia Cup in May 2019. On 5 September 2019, he made his England U19s debut during a 3–1 victory over Greece at St. George's Park. On 13 October 2020, Ramsey made his debut for the England U20s and scored during a 2–0 victory over Wales at St. George's Park.

On 7 October 2021, Ramsey made his debut for the England U21s during a 2–2 U21 EURO qualifying away draw to Slovenia. On 25 March 2022, Ramsey scored his first goal for England U21s, in a 4–1 victory over Andorra.

On 14 June 2023, Ramsey was included in the England squad for the 2023 UEFA European Under-21 Championship. He scored a goal in their opening group match against Czech Republic. A metatarsal injury sustained in the quarter-final victory over Portugal ruled him out of their final two games of the competition, a tournament the Young Lions ultimately went on to win.

== Personal life ==
Ramsey was born in the Great Barr area of Birmingham and attended the Barr Beacon School in Walsall. His younger brothers are both also footballers, Aaron plays for Burnley having graduated through the Aston Villa academy and Cole plays for the Tottenham Hotspur academy after previously also playing for the Aston Villa U18s. His father Mark was a professional boxer, who fought future unified light-welterweight world champion Ricky Hatton twice early in his career, losing both times on a points decision.

== Career statistics ==
As of match played 5 September 2026

Appearances and goals by club, season and competition
Club	Season	League			FA Cup		EFL Cup		Europe		Other		Total	
Club	Season	Division	Apps	Goals	Apps	Goals	Apps	Goals	Apps	Goals	Apps	Goals	Apps	Goals
Aston Villa	2018–19	Championship	1	0	0	0	0	0	—		0	0	1	0
Aston Villa	2019–20	Premier League	0	0	1	0	1	0	—		—		2	0
Aston Villa	2020–21	Premier League	22	0	0	0	3	0	—		—		25	0
Aston Villa	2021–22	Premier League	34	6	1	0	0	0	—		—		35	6
Aston Villa	2022–23	Premier League	35	6	1	0	2	0	—		—		38	6
Aston Villa	2023–24	Premier League	16	1	2	0	0	0	3 (Note: Appearances in UEFA Europa Conference League)	0	—		21	1
Aston Villa	2024–25	Premier League	29	1	5	2	1	0	10 (Note: Appearances in UEFA Champions League)	1	—		45	4
Aston Villa	Total		137	14	10	2	7	0	13	1	0	0	167	17
Doncaster Rovers (loan)	2019–20	League One	7	3	—		—		—		—		7	3
Newcastle United	2025–26	Premier League	28	2	2	0	4	0	9	0	—		43	2
Newcastle United	2026–27	Premier League	3	1	0	0	1	0	—		—		4	1
Newcastle United	Total		31	3	2	0	5	0	9	0	—		47	3
Career total			175	20	12	2	11	0	22	1	0	0	220	23

== Honours ==
England U21

- UEFA European Under-21 Championship: 2023

Individual

- Aston Villa Academy Player of the Season: 2018–19
- Aston Villa Young Player of the Season: 2021–22 2022–23
- Aston Villa Player's Player of the Season: 2021–22
- Premier League Academy Graduate of the Season: 2022–23
