= Hayden Lindley =

English footballer

Personal information
- Full name: Hayden Taylor Lindley
- Date of birth: 2 September 2002 (age 24)
- Place of birth: Huddersfield, England
- Height: 1.82 m (6 ft 0 in)
- Position: Midfielder

Team information
- Current team: Emley

Youth career
- Honley Junior
- 2008–2010: Blackburn Rovers
- 2010–2019: Manchester City
- 2019–2021: Aston Villa

Senior career*
Years	Team	Apps	(Gls)
2021–2023	Aston Villa	0	(0)
2022	→ Newport County (loan)	5	(0)
2023	Golcar United	1	(0)
2023–2024	Darlington	14	(0)
2024	→ Pontefract Collieries (loan)	5	(1)
2024–2025	FC United of Manchester	18	(0)
2025–	Emley	10	(1)
- * Club domestic league appearances and goals as of 14:09, 17 March 2025 (UTC)

Hayden Taylor Lindley (born 2 September 2002) is an English footballer who plays as a midfielder for Northern Premier League Premier Division club Emley. Lindley is a product of the Aston Villa Academy and was also on the books of Manchester City and Blackburn Rovers as a junior. He appeared in the EFL Cup for Aston Villa and in the Football League for Newport County before moving into non-league football.

== Career ==
=== Early career ===
After impressing for the under-eights team of local side Honley Junior Football Club, Lindley joined the youth setup at Blackburn Rovers in October 2008. Soon after, he also began training with Manchester City's academy at a site in Bradford. Lindley was also approached by Leeds United but did not join them. Lindley remained with City until July 2019, when he departed to join Aston Villa.

=== Aston Villa ===
On 8 January 2021, Lindley made his first-team debut for Aston Villa as a substitute in a FA Cup third round tie against Liverpool, after Villa had been forced to name a team of inexperienced academy players after a large number of first-team players tested positive for COVID-19. Lindley was ever-present for Aston Villa U18s' run to the final of the 2021 FA Youth Cup, in which they beat Liverpool U18s 2–1. He was one of six members of that squad to sign new contracts with Aston Villa at the end of the season. Lindley again appeared for the first team on 24 August in Villa's away win against Barrow in the EFL Cup; he came on in the second half as a late substitute for Frédéric Guilbert.

On 1 September 2022, Lindley joined Newport County on loan for the remainder of the 2022–23 season. He made his debut for Newport on 13 September as a second-half substitute in a 1–0 League Two defeat to Stevenage, and made four more league appearances, but he fell out of favour after a change of management and returned to Villa on 1 January 2023.

Towards the end of the 2022–23 season, with the end of his Aston Villa contract approaching, Lindley was allowed to go on trial with League One club Cheltenham Town. He was released by Aston Villa when his contract expired.

=== Darlington ===
After leaving Aston Villa, Lindley played one match for Northern Counties East League club Golcar United on a non-contract basis, a 1–1 draw against Bottesford Town on 14 October 2023.

Lindley signed for National League North club Darlington on 24 October, and made his debut the same day, as a substitute in a goalless draw against Blyth Spartans. He was a regular starter in 2023, but fell out of contention in 2024, and on 28 March he joined Northern Premier League Division One East club Pontefract Collieries on loan until the end of the season. He was released by Darlington when his contract expired.

=== FC United of Manchester ===
Lindley joined Northern Premier League Premier Division club FC United of Manchester for the 2024–25 season.

=== Emley ===
After making 23 appearances in all competitions in the first half of the campaign, Lindley left FC United and signed for Northern Premier League Division One East club Emley.

== Career statistics ==
As of match played 15 March 2025

Appearances and goals by club, season and competition
Club	Season	League			FA Cup		EFL Cup		Other		Total	
Club	Season	Division	Apps	Goals	Apps	Goals	Apps	Goals	Apps	Goals	Apps	Goals
Aston Villa U21	2020–21	—	—		—		—		1 (Note: Appearance(s) in EFL Trophy)	0	1	0
Aston Villa U21	2021–22	—	—		—		—		3	0	3	0
Aston Villa U21	2022–23	—	—		—		—		1	0	1	0
Aston Villa U21	Total		—		—		—		5	0	5	0
Aston Villa	2020–21	Premier League	0	0	1	0	0	0	—		1	0
Aston Villa	2021–22	Premier League	0	0	0	0	1	0	—		1	0
Aston Villa	2022–23	Premier League	0	0	0	0	0	0	—		0	0
Aston Villa	Total		0	0	1	0	1	0	—		2	0
Newport County (loan)	2022–23	League Two	5	0	0	0	0	0	0	0	5	0
Golcar United	2023–24	NCEFL Premier Division	1	0	—		—		—		1	0
Darlington	2023–24	National League North	14	0	—		—		0	0	14	0
Pontefract Collieries (loan)	2023–24	Northern Premier League; Division One East	5	1	—		—		0	0	5	1
FC United of Manchester	2024–25	NPL Premier Division	18	0	2	0	—		3 (Note: Two appearances in FA Trophy, one in Manchester Premier Cup)	0	23	0
Emley	2024–25	NPL Division One East	10	1	—		—		0	0	10	1
Career total			53	2	3	0	1	0	8	0	65	2

== Honours ==
Aston Villa U18

- FA Youth Cup: 2020–21
