= Ajani Burchall =

Bermudian footballer (born 2004)

Personal information
- Full name: Ajani Alexander Edward Burchall
- Date of birth: 5 November 2004 (age 22)
- Place of birth: Hamilton, Bermuda
- Position: Winger

Team information
- Current team: Wimborne Town
- Number: 12

Youth career
- 2012–2016: North Village Rams
- 2016–2020: AFC Bournemouth

Senior career*
Years	Team	Apps	(Gls)
2020–2021	AFC Bournemouth	1	(0)
2021–2025	Aston Villa	0	(0)
2025–	Wimborne Town	26	(1)

International career^{‡}
2018–2019	Bermuda U15	3	(0)
2026–	Bermuda	1	(0)
- * Club domestic league appearances and goals as of 15:05, 6 May 2026 (UTC) ‡ National team caps and goals as of 23:38, 25 September 2026 (UTC)

Ajani Alexander Edward Burchall (born 5 November 2004) is a Bermudian footballer who plays as a winger for Southern Premier South club Wimborne Town and the Bermuda national team.

He is a product of the North Village Rams youth team in Hamilton, Bermuda, and was signed by AFC Bournemouth at the age of eleven. He became Bournemouth's third youngest player of all time when he appeared for their senior side as a late substitute in December 2020, and he transferred to Aston Villa six months later, joining their academy. He has played internationally at under-15 level for Bermuda.

== Club career ==
=== AFC Bournemouth ===
Burchall was born in Bermuda and joined AFC Bournemouth in 2016 from the youth side of North Village Rams, based near Hamilton, Bermuda. In March 2019, at the age of 14, he signed a pre-scholarship agreement with the club. On 12 December 2020, he made his professional debut in the Championship, coming on as a late substitute in a 5–0 win over Huddersfield Town. The appearance made him Bournemouth's third youngest player of all time.

=== Aston Villa ===
On 9 July 2021, Burchall joined Premier League club Aston Villa for an undisclosed transfer fee. In October 2021, after a positive start for Villa in the U18 Premier League in which he scored three goals, and provided three assists in his first four games, Burchall was named by The Guardian as one of the top young prospects in English football. On 10 November 2021, Burchall was given his first full professional contract by Aston Villa.

In August 2022, Burchall suffered an anterior cruciate ligament injury during a training session - which was expected to rule him out for the whole season.

Burchall made his return to football on 15 December 2023, after more than a year sidelined, in a 1–1 draw against Fulham U21 in the Premier League 2. On 3 July 2024, Burchall signed a new contract with Aston Villa.

On 9 June 2025, it was announced that Burchall would be released by Aston Villa when his contract expired on 30 June.

=== WimborneTown ===
On 20 September 2025, Burchall joined non-league club Wimborne Town.

== International career ==
Burchall has represented Bermuda at under-15 level, playing for them in the 2019 CONCACAF Boys' Under-15 Championship.

== Personal life ==
Burchall grew up in the Paget Parish of Bermuda. He attended Bournemouth Collegiate School.

== Career statistics ==
As of match played 25 April 2026

Appearances and goals by club, season and competition
Club	Season	League			FA Cup		EFL Cup		Other		Total	
Club	Season	Division	Apps	Goals	Apps	Goals	Apps	Goals	Apps	Goals	Apps	Goals
AFC Bournemouth	2020–21	Championship	1	0	0	0	0	0	0	0	1	0
Wimborne Town	2025–26	Southern Football League	26	1	0	0	–		0	0	26	1
Career total			27	1	0	0	0	0	0	0	27	1
