= Aston Villa F.C. Under-21s and Academy =

Aston Villa Under-21
- Full name: Aston Villa Football Club Under-21s & Academy
- Nicknames: Villans, The Villa, The Lions, The Claret & Blue Army
- Short name: Villa, AVFC
- Founded: 21 November 1874; 151 years ago
- Ground: Bodymoor Heath Training Ground
- Capacity: 500
- Owner(s): Nassef Sawiris; Wesley Edens
- Chairman: Nassef Sawiris
- Manager: Jimmy Shan
- League: Premier League 2
- 2025–26: Premier League 2, 11th (Quarter-finalists)
- Website: www.avfc.co.uk
Home colours	Away colours	Third colours

The Aston Villa Under-21s, formerly known as Aston Villa Reserves and Aston Villa Under-23s, are the most senior youth development team of Aston Villa and compete in Premier League 2, the EFL Trophy and the Birmingham Senior Cup in the 2026–27 season. The team plays its home games at Aston Villa's training ground, Bodymoor Heath and occasionally Villa Park. They will also field an under-19 side in the 2026–27 UEFA Youth League following Aston Villa's senior side qualifying for the UEFA Champions League in the 2025-26 season. Aston Villa also have an academy side that competes in the Under-18 division of the Professional Development League, the U18 Premier League Cup, and the FA Youth Cup annually.

Aston Villa have fielded reserve, junior, or 'A' sides since their formation in 1874 and the team were part of the FA Premier Reserve League at its foundation in 1999, subsequently winning five regional titles including the 2011–12 Premier Reserve League South, the last in that format. The side has been successful in recent decades, as well as becoming national champions in the 2003–04 and 2009–10 seasons, the team also won four out of five Southern Championships between 2007 and 2012, before the format changed to the Professional Development League. The side also won the NextGen Series in 2013, a Europe-wide tournament for elite academies.

Current Villa players to have come through the youth system at the club and appear in competitive senior matches are Jamaldeen Jimoh-Aloba, Lamare Bogarde, Bradley Burrowes, George Hemmings, James Wright, and Kadan Young. Notable former players to have come through the Villa academy include Jack Grealish, Brian Little, Gabriel Agbonlahor, Ciaran Clark, Gary Cahill, Gareth Barry, Thomas Hitzlsperger, Darius Vassell, Marc Albrighton, Andreas Weimann, Brian McClair, and Steven Davis among many others. The U21 team is made up of players under the age of 21, although five over-age outfield players and an over-age goalkeeper may be named in a Premier League 2 match squad, these may include fringe first-team players and senior players recovering from injury.

== History ==
Reserve sides of Aston Villa had played unofficial matches since the formation of the club in 1874, while formal competition for a reserve side began in 1892, when Aston Villa Reserves joined the Birmingham & District League. After finishing in the runners-up position twice in the first 2 seasons of the competition, Villa finally won their first trophy in the 1894–95 season, winning 26 out of 30 league games and losing just once all season. Several titles followed after this achievement, including a run of 8 consecutive titles between 1902 and 1910. When Villa finally left the Birmingham & District League in 1915, they had accumulated a total of 12 league titles and 6 runners-up finishes. After that, the reserve team played in the Central League for many years, becoming champions in 1929–30,

In Villa's last pre-war reserve team match in 1939 they played Derby Reserves at home (Carey, Godfrey, Guttridge, L.J. Latham, Moss, Barker, Goffin, Osborne, Shell, Bate, Houghton). That September 1939 the club closed down and the players were paid-off. In December 1940, the story went viral that the Aston Villa reserves had been captured at Dunkirk and played their German captors in a football match. TIME Magazine issued an apology for, when reporting the match, erroneously placing Aston in the city of Liverpool.There was indeed an "Aston Villa" football team at Stalag XXID and two former-Villa fringe players James Allen and George Hardy may possibly have played as British POWs. Villa Chairman Fred Normansell was unable to confirm the story and suggested an imaginative American London correspondent as the source.

The reserve team continued in the Central League for many years, becoming champions in 1963–64 and 1992–93.

In 1999–2000, the FA Premier Reserve League was set up, Villa were one of the founding members, and were split into the Northern section of the league. Three disappointing seasons followed, however in the 2003–04 season, inspired by brothers Stefan Moore and Luke Moore, Villa eased to their first title. In the two seasons which followed (2004–05 and 2005–06), Villa agonisingly finished both campaigns as runners-up, both times to Manchester United. In the 2006–07 season, for the first time since its introduction, the FA Premier Reserve League excluded Coca-Cola Championship teams from playing in the league, with the 20 senior English Premiership teams parallelling the teams involved in the FA Premier League. This also meant that due to geographical circumstances, Aston Villa Reserves were switched from the Northern Division, to the Southern equivalent, for the first time since the start of the original format in 1999. Villa eventually finished 4th - winning 9 out of their 18 games, with Luke Moore the top goalscorer, with 7. The season saw the impressive development of several youngsters, most notably including Zoltán Stieber, Shane Lowry and Stephen O'Halloran, all of which were rewarded with first-team opportunities in the pre-season fixtures, prior to the 2007–08 season.

Inspired by Swedish striker Tobias Mikaelsson, Aston Villa Reserves clinched the 2007–08 Southern title, their second regional success since the inception of the league in 1999. However, they were beaten 3–0 in the Play-Off Final by Northern champions Liverpool.

In the 2008–09 season, the team went one better by securing their second consecutive Southern title, and then defeating Sunderland to claim their first ever national title, with goals from Nathan Delfouneso, James Collins and Shane Lowry.

Andreas Weimann netted nine goals, to help Villa keep up their trend of securing the Southern title - their third consecutively - in the 2009–10 season. This included a remarkable 15-game unbeaten streak, running from the opening game of the campaign, all the way through to the last game of the season against Portsmouth. However, the club were denied a second consecutive national title, as they were beaten on penalties by Manchester United, after a 3–3 draw at Old Trafford.

The 2010–11 season saw changes to the standard format of the league. Only 16 clubs competed, which meant a split between the top heavy Northern league. Undoubtedly the highlight of the season, was a 10–1 home victory over Arsenal at the Greene King Stadium, en route to finishing third in the league.

Following changes arrived in the 2011–12 season. Three leagues were abolished, returning to two, whilst each team played the teams in their own league home and away. They also played each team in the regional league once, with home and away games split evenly. More success followed however, as Villa picked up another Southern title, with Andreas Weimann scoring nine times during the course of the season. It was a case of deja vu however, as they were again beaten on penalties by Manchester United at Old Trafford.

The Premier Reserve League was abolished during the summer of 2012, to make way for the Professional Development League 1. Aston Villa were one of 22 clubs to take part in the inaugural season, participating in Group 2 of the competition.

During the 13-year tenure of the original Reserve system, Aston Villa were the second most successful club - behind Manchester United - with five regional titles and one national title. The youth sides currently play their home matches at Villa Park and Bodymoor Heath. From 2019, having been promoted back to the Premier League, Aston Villa began fielding an under-21 side in the EFL Trophy against League One and League Two opposition.

In January 2021, after a COVID-19 outbreak in the first team, the youth team was used for a first team game against Liverpool in the FA cup 3rd round.

After a successful 2022–23 season with the senior side, Jacob Ramsey was recognised by the Premier League with the 2022/23 Premier League Academy Graduate award.

On 12 June 2025, after managing the U18 team to a league and Youth Cup double the previous season, Jimmy Shan was named U21 manager, replacing the outgoing Josep Gombau.

== Aston Villa Under-21s ==
=== Squad ===
As of 31 August 2026. Players under 21 who have made their senior league debut, or are named in the official senior squad list, are listed in the senior squad.

Note: Flags indicate national team as defined under FIFA eligibility rules; some limited exceptions apply. Players may hold more than one non-FIFA nationality.

No.	Pos.	Nation	Player
20	MF	ENG	Jamaldeen Jimoh-Aloba
50	GK	ENG	Blade Earley
55	DF	ENG	Travis Patterson
57	FW	SCO	Rory Wilson
60	GK	ENG	Owen Asemota
63	MF	IRL	Alfie Lynskey
65	GK	ENG	Sam Lewis
66	DF	ENG	Leon Routh
67	FW	ENG	Mason Cotcher
68	MF	ENG	Trai-Varn Mulley
69	FW	NIR	Cole Brannigan

No.	Pos.	Nation	Player
70	DF	POR	Rodrigo Fortes
71	DF	ENG	TJ Carroll
72	DF	ENG	Ashton McWilliams
73	MF	ENG	Max Jenner
76	FW	ENG	Vinnie Hayward
77	MF	IRL	Keilan Quinn
78	DF	ENG	Teddie Bloomfield
79	MF	SCO	Fletcher Boyd
80	DF	GER	Woody Burgess
96	GK	ENG	Jack Allan
—	DF	ENG	Jacob Green

=== Out on loan ===
Note: Flags indicate national team as defined under FIFA eligibility rules; some limited exceptions apply. Players may hold more than one non-FIFA nationality.

No.	Pos.	Nation	Player
28	FW	NED	Zépiqueno Redmond (at FC Annecy until 30 June 2027)
45	DF	ENG	Triston Rowe (at Sporting De Charleroi until 30 June 2027)
49	MF	ENG	Bradley Burrowes (at Wigan Athletic until 30 June 2027)
51	MF	ENG	Kadan Young (at FC Annecy until 30 June 2027)
52	GK	ENG	Sam Proctor (at Shrewsbury Town until 30 June 2027)
54	MF	SCO	Aidan Borland (at Accrington until 30 June 2027)

No.	Pos.	Nation	Player
56	DF	ENG	Lino Sousa (at Shrewsbury Town until 30 June 2027)
58	MF	ENG	Tommi O'Reilly (at Doncaster Rovers until 30 June 2027)
59	DF	SCO	Josh Feeney (at Peterborough United until 30 June 2027)
62	MF	ENG	Ben Broggio (at Stevenage until 30 June 2027)
64	MF	ENG	Kane Taylor (at Rochdale until 31st December 2026)
74	MF	ENG	Luka Lynch (at Oxford United until 2 January 2027)

=== Reserve, U21 & U23 Honours ===
Birmingham & District League

- Winners:
  - 1894/95, 1895/96, 1899/1900, 1902/03, 1903/04, 1904/05, 1905/06, 1906/07, 1907/08, 1908/09, 1909/10, 1911/12, 1959-60 (Division Two).
- Runners-Up:
  - 1892/93, 1893/94, 1897/98, 1898/99, 1900/01, 1910/11.

Birmingham Senior Cup

- Winners:
  - 1879/80, 1881/82, 1882/83, 1883/84, 1884/85, 1887/88, 1888/89, 1889/90, 1890/91, 1895/96, 1898/99, 1902/03, 1903/04, 1905/06, 1907/08, 1908/09, 1909/10, 1911/12, 1984/85, 2023/24.
- Runners-Up:
  - 1875/76, 1880/81, 1892/93, 1894/95, 1900/01, 1901/02, 1923/24, 1982/83, 1994/95, 1995/96.

FA Premier Reserve League North

- Winners:
  - 2003/04.
- Runners-Up:
  - 2004/05, 2005/06.

FA Premier Reserve League South

- Winners:
  - 2007/08, 2008/09, 2009/10, 2011/12

FA Premier League Cup

- Winners:
  - 2017/18

FA Premier Reserve League

- Winners:
  - 2008/09.
- Runners-Up:
  - 2007/08, 2009/10, 2011/12.

== Aston Villa Academy ==
Aston Villa Under-18
- Full name: Aston Villa Football Club Under-18s
- Nicknames: Villans, The Villa, The Lions, The Claret & Blue Army
- Short name: Villa, AVFC
- Founded: 21 November 1874; 151 years ago
- Ground: Bodymoor Heath Training Ground
- Capacity: 500
- Owner(s): Nassef Sawiris; Wesley Edens
- Chairman: Nassef Sawiris
- Manager: Richard Beale
- League: U18 Premier League
- 2025–26: U18 Premier League, 3rd (South)
- Website: http://www.avfc.co.uk/
Home colours	Away colours	Third colours

Aston Villa Academy is the youth development side of Premier League team Aston Villa, it fields an under-18s team in the U18 Premier League (South), the U18 Premier League Cup, and the FA Youth Cup. An under-16 side also compete in the U16 Premier League Cup.

Historically known as 'Aston Villa Youth', Villa have been known as one of the most successful and productive academies in England. Villa's youth team has a strong history in the FA Youth Cup with wins in 1972, 1980, 2002, 2021 and 2025. Villa were also runners-up in 1978, 2004 and 2010.

In modern times Villa's U18s competed in the Premier Academy League from its foundation in 1997, winning the U17 title in 2003-04 and the U18 title in 2008. In the 2007-08 season Villa clinched top spot in Group B of the Premier Academy League, recording the most wins (22), most points (68) and most goals (84) of all 41 clubs involved. Villa's youngsters were drawn against Group A winners Arsenal in the semi-final, which they won 1-0. This subsequently meant a final against FA Youth Cup winners Manchester City, which was won 2–0, with goals from James Collins and Chris Herd. The top scorers for the season were Austrian striker Andreas Weimann (16) and English striker Nathan Delfouneso (15) who both went on to be first team regulars.

The 2008/09 season was less fruitful for Villa's youngsters, as they finished 3rd in Group B, and were knocked out of the FA Youth Cup at the first hurdle, losing in the Third Round to eventual champions Arsenal. The side won the 2024-25 U18 Premier League South.

The team train at Bodymoor Heath in North Warwickshire and also play their home matches there on weekends.

=== Invitational Tournaments ===
==== Hong Kong Soccer Sevens ====
The annual invitational seven-a-side Hong Kong Soccer Sevens tournament brings together academy sides from around the world, and has brought notable success to Aston Villa's academy between since 1999. Villa have won the main tournament seven times, more than any other team.

Villa won the third HK Soccer Sevens tournament in 2002, defeating Arsenal in the final, they went on to defend their title in 2004 (as the 2003 competition was cancelled due to the SARS outbreak), inspired by Stephen Cooke and Steven Foley they clinched the trophy in the final against Manchester United. Striker Gabriel Agbonlahor captained Villa to the semi-final in 2006 - losing to the eventual winners Urawa Red Diamonds - and also received the 'Player of the Tournament' accolade. Villa won the competition again in May 2010, beating Central Coast Mariners of Australia in the final. In the in 2019 tournament, Villa won the secondary 'plate' trophy; players including Akos Onodi, Lewis Brunt and Cameron Archer featured. After a four year hiatus due to COVID-19 and the Hong Kong protests the tournament returned in May 2023. At the tournament Villa extended their record of victories to seven, defeating Tai Po FC in the final, Omari Kellyman was named player of the tournament and was also topscorer with five goals overall.

==== NextGen Series ====
The Aston Villa Academy played in both seasons of the now defunct NextGen Series, a tournament for Europe's elite football academies between 2011 and 2013. The team was composed of under-18s with up to three under-19s in each matchday squad. Having made the quarter-finals in the 2011-12 Series, the academy side captained by Samir Carruthers won the final of the 2012-13 tournament on 1 April 2013 beating Chelsea 2–0, at the Stadio Giuseppe Sinigaglia, in Como, Italy.

==== CEE Cup ====
Aston Villa sent an under-19 side to the invitational CEE Cup in the Czech Republic for the first time in 2022, competing against the youth sides of elite sides from around the world including Palmeiras, Tigres UANL and Dynamo Kyiv. Villa narrowly lost all three of their matches, finishing 6th in the overall rankings, Kerr Smith and Todd Alcock scored for Villa during the competition.

==== Stanislav Štrunc Memorial Tournament ====
Aston Villa submitted U19 sides to the 2024 and 2025 editions of the Stanislav Štrunc Memorial Tournament held by FC Viktoria Plzeň in the Czech Republic. Villa player, Ben Broggio, was named player of the tournament in 2024.

=== Academy squad ===
As of 29 August 2025. Some players at under-18 level have been promoted to the under-21 and senior sides.

Note: Flags indicate national team as defined under FIFA eligibility rules; some limited exceptions apply. Players may hold more than one non-FIFA nationality.

No.	Pos.	Nation	Player
51	MF	WAL	Lennon Moss
52	DF	ENG	Vincely Mudame
56	FW	ENG	Erin Orebowale
64	DF	ENG	Harry Pinnell
75	FW	ENG	Tay'veon Smithen
81	GK	ENG	Theo Houston
82	FW	ENG	Oscar Johnson
83	MF	ENG	Jack McGrath
84	FW	ENG	Markie Meade
85	DF	ENG	Clay Atkins
86	DF	SWE	Farid Addey
87	FW	ENG	Daniel Adediran
88	MF	ENG	Oliver Bindley

No.	Pos.	Nation	Player
89	MF	ENG	Josh Blake
90	FW	ENG	Rio Hammond
91	DF	ENG	MJ Iyeli
92	FW	ENG	Jahmi Kellyman
93	DF	ENG	Kairi Ketebu
94	MF	ENG	Olly Lloyd
95	GK	ENG	Rhys Oakley
97	GK	ENG	Jayden Garthwaite
98	MF	ENG	Lennon Melhuish
99	DF	ENG	Curtis Mitchell
—	DF	ENG	Finlay Barnard
—	MF	ENG	Jake Doughty

=== Youth squad ===
Note: Flags indicate national team as defined under FIFA eligibility rules; some limited exceptions apply. Players may hold more than one non-FIFA nationality.

No.	Pos.	Nation	Player
—	GK	ENG	Lewis Field
—	DF	ENG	Jaylen Bolton
—	DF	NOR	Alvin Brown
—	DF	ENG	Cameron Ellis
—	DF	IRL	Ashton Gunning
—	DF	WAL	Fabian Williams

No.	Pos.	Nation	Player
—	MF	ENG	Curtis Owen
—	MF	CAN	Hayden Renardson
—	MF	ENG	Levi Richard
—	MF	ESP	Dodzi Sewordor Sanchez
—	FW	ENG	Leon Lynch
—	FW	WAL	George Thomas

=== Academy records ===
- Best FA Youth Cup performance: Champions, 1971–72, 1979–80, 2001–02, 2020–21, 2024–25
- Best League Trophy performance: Round of 16 (Northern Section), 2024–25

=== Academy honours ===
FA Youth Cup

- Winners:
  - 1972, 1980, 2002, 2021, 2025
- Runners-Up:
  - 1978, 2004, 2010

Professional U18 Development League National Champion

- Winners:
  - 2024–25

Professional U18 Development League Southern Division

- Winners:
  - 2024–25

NextGen Series

- Winners:
  - 2012–13

FA Premier Academy League U17s

- Winners:
  - 2003–04

FA Premier Academy League U18s: Group B

- Winners:
  - 2007–08
  - 2010–11

FA Premier Academy League U18s: Play-Offs

- Winners:
  - 2007–08
- Runners-Up:
  - 2007

Under-18 Premier League Next Gen Berlin Cup

- Winners:
  - 2024

Premier League Under-16 National Tournament

- Winners:
  - 2022

HKFC International Soccer Sevens

- Main Tournament Winners:
  - 2002, 2004, 2007, 2008, 2010, 2016, 2023
- Shield Winners:
  - 2013, 2014, 2018
- Plate Winners:
  - 2019

== Non-playing staff ==
=== Corporate hierarchy ===
Position	Name
Executive Chairman	Nassef Sawiris
Co-chairman	Wes Edens
President of Business Operations	Chris Heck
President of Football Operations	Roberto Olabe

=== Management hierarchy ===
Position	Name
Global Director of Football Development and International Academies	Matthew Kidson
Academy Manager	Mark Harrison
Head of Coach Development	Ryan Maye
Assistant Academy Manager	Sean Verity
Assistant Head of Coach Development	Sean Verity
Emerging Talent Programme Manager	Tony Carss
Under-21 Head Coach	Jimmy Shan
Under-21 Coach	Peter Gilbert
Under-21 Coach	Dan Green
Under-21 Goalkeeping Coach	Mark Naylor
Under-21 Sport Scientist	Dan Lothian
Under-21 Physiotherapist	Jon Whitney
Under-21 Performance Analyst	Adam McGuinness
Under-18 Lead Coach	Richard Beale
Under-18 Professional Development Coach	Adem Atay
Under-18 Professional Development Coach	Karl Hopper
Under-18 Goalkeeping Coach	Michael Pearce
Under-18 Sport Scientist	Peter Sharp
Under-18 Physiotherapist	Cian McCaffrey
Under-18 Performance Analyst	Phil Truran
Academy Doctor	Dr M Sahni and Dr F Hassan
Head of Sports Medicine	Jazz Sodhi

== Notable Academy graduates ==
The following players have all been members of the Aston Villa academy before their professional debut and have either made at least one appearance for the Villa first team in professional competition, have gone on to play in a fully professional league, or have represented their national team. Players in bold are still contracted to the club.

=== 2020s ===
	Player	DOB	Position	Professional Debut	First-Team Appearances	First-Team Goals	Current Team
(England)	**Luka Lynch**	11 January 2007	Midfielder	5 September 2026 (League One for Oxford United)	Ongoing	Ongoing	Aston Villa
(Egypt)	Omar Khedr	25 May 2006	Forward	1 September 2026 (Egyptian Premier League for ZED)	0	0	ZED
(England)	**Kane Taylor**	20 February 2005	Midfielder	13 January 2026 (League Two for Oldham Athletic)	Ongoing	Ongoing	Aston Villa
(England)	**George Hemmings**	4 March 2007	Midfielder	30 December 2025 (vs Arsenal)	Ongoing	Ongoing	Aston Villa
(England)	**Bradley Burrowes**	4 March 2008	Midfielder	31 August 2025 (vs Crystal Palace)	Ongoing	Ongoing	Aston Villa
(Scotland)	**Aidan Borland**	25 April 2007	Midfielder	25 September 2024 (vs Wycombe Wanderers)	Ongoing	Ongoing	Aston Villa
(England)	**Ben Broggio**	29 January 2007	Midfielder	25 September 2024 (vs Wycombe Wanderers)	Ongoing	Ongoing	Aston Villa
(England)	**Jamaldeen Jimoh-Aloba**	2 October 2006	Midfielder	25 September 2024 (vs Wycombe Wanderers)	Ongoing	Ongoing	Aston Villa
(England)	**Travis Patterson**	6 October 2005	Defender	25 September 2024 (vs Wycombe Wanderers)	Ongoing	Ongoing	Aston Villa
(England)	**Kadan Young**	19 January 2006	Forward	25 September 2024 (vs Wycombe Wanderers)	Ongoing	Ongoing	Aston Villa
(Poland)	**Oliwier Zych**	28 June 2004	Goalkeeper	15 September 2024 (Ekstraklasa for Puszcza Niepołomice)	Ongoing	Ongoing	Aston Villa
(England)	**James Wright**	2 December 2004	Goalkeeper	7 September 2024 (Primera Federación for Real Unión)	Ongoing	Ongoing	Aston Villa
(England)	Finley Munroe	8 February 2005	Defender	9 May 2024 (vs Olympiacos)	2	0	Middlesbrough
(Scotland)	**Josh Feeney**	6 May 2005	Defender	10 February 2024 (Primera Federación for Real Unión)	Ongoing	Ongoing	Aston Villa
(England)	**Tommi O'Reilly**	15 December 2003	Midfielder	14 December 2023 (vs Zrinjski Mostar)	Ongoing	Ongoing	Aston Villa
(England)	Filip Marschall	24 April 2003	Goalkeeper	14 December 2023 (vs Zrinjski Mostar)	1	0	Millwall
(England)	Chisom Afoka	23 September 2003	Forward	9 September 2023 (League Two for Bradford City)	2	0	Stourbridge
(England)	Omari Kellyman	25 September 2005	Forward	31 August 2023 (vs Hibernian)	6	0	RC Strasbourg
(England)	Tim Iroegbunam	30 June 2003	Midfielder	26 February 2022 (vs Brighton & Hove Albion)	19	0	Hull
(England)	Lewis Brunt	6 November 2000	Defender	8 January 2022 (FA Cup for Leicester City)	0	0	Bolton Wanderers
(England)	Sebastian Revan	14 July 2003	Defender	31 August 2021 (National League for Grimsby Town)	6	1	(Wales) Wrexham
(England)	Aaron Ramsey	21 January 2003	Midfielder	24 August 2021 (vs Barrow)	4	1	Burnley
(England)	Jaden Philogene	8 February 2002	Midfielder	19 May 2021 (vs Tottenham Hotspur)	21	0	Ipswich Town
(England)	Carney Chukwuemeka	20 October 2003	Midfielder	19 May 2021 (vs Tottenham Hotspur)	15	0	(Germany) Borussia Dortmund & Austria
(Republic of Ireland)	Tyreik Wright	22 September 2001	Midfielder	23 January 2021 (League Two with Walsall)	5	0	Bradford City
(England)	Mungo Bridge	12 September 2000	Defender	8 January 2021 (vs Liverpool)	1	0	Unattached
(Hungary)	Ákos Onódi	2 September 2001	Goalkeeper	8 January 2021 (vs Liverpool)	1	0	(Hungary) Szeged
(England)	Dominic Revan	19 September 2000	Defender	8 January 2021 (vs Liverpool)	1	0	Salisbury
(England)	Jake Walker	3 November 2000	Defender	8 January 2021 (vs Liverpool)	1	0	Unattached
(England)	Callum Rowe	2 September 1999	Defender	8 January 2021 (vs Liverpool)	1	0	Chorley
(England)	Harrison Sohna	1 July 2002	Midfielder	8 January 2021 (vs Liverpool)	1	0	Woking
(England)	Louie Barry	21 June 2003	Forward	8 January 2021 (vs Liverpool)	1	1	Sheffield Wednesday
(England)	Kaine Kesler-Hayden	23 October 2002	Defender	8 January 2021 (vs Liverpool)	5	0	Coventry City
(England)	Arjan Raikhy	20 October 2002	Midfielder	8 January 2021 (vs Liverpool)	1	0	Boston United
(England)	Brad Young	6 January 2003	Forward	8 January 2021 (vs Liverpool)	1	0	(Wales) The New Saints
(Spain)	Mamadou Sylla	12 August 2002	Midfielder	8 January 2021 (vs Liverpool)	1	0	(Sweden) Örebro Syrianska
(Netherlands)	**Lamare Bogarde**	5 January 2004	Midfielder	8 January 2021 (vs Liverpool)	Ongoing	Ongoing	Aston Villa
(England)	Hayden Lindley	2 September 2002	Midfielder	8 January 2021 (vs Liverpool)	2	0	Emley
(Netherlands)	Sil Swinkels	6 January 2004	Defender	8 January 2021 (vs Liverpool)	2	0	Sheffield Wednesday
(England)	Edward Rowe	17 October 2003	Midfielder	8 January 2021 (vs Liverpool)	7	0	Worcester City
(Scotland)	Aaron Pressley	7 November 2001	Forward	1 December 2020 (Championship with Brentford)	0	0	Walsall
(Sweden)	Viktor Johansson	14 September 1998	Goalkeeper	7 November 2020 (Championship with Rotherham United)	0	0	Stoke City
(France)	Dimitri Sea	20 August 2001	Defender	3 November 2020 (League Two with Barrow)	0	0	Unattached
(Finland)	Viljami Sinisalo	11 October 2001	Goalkeeper	6 October 2020 (Scottish Championship with Ayr United)	2	0	(Scotland) Celtic
(United States)	Indiana Vassilev	16 February 2001	Forward	4 January 2020 (vs Fulham)	8	1	(United States) Philadelphia Union

=== 2010s ===
	Player	DOB	Position	First-Team Debut	First-Team Appearances	First-Team Goals	Current Team
(England)	Cameron Archer	21 July 2001	Forward	27 August 2019 (vs Crewe Alexandra)	14	4	Southampton
(England)	Harvey Knibbs	26 April 1999	Forward	13 August 2019 (EFL Cup for Cambridge United)	0	0	Charlton Athletic
(Bermuda)	Osagi Bascome	17 April 1998	Forward	30 March 2019 (National League North with Darlington)	0	0	Deceased, 18 December 2021.
(England)	Jacob Ramsey	28 May 2001	Midfielder	19 February 2019 (vs West Bromwich Albion)	167	17	Newcastle United
(England)	Kelsey Mooney	5 February 1999	Forward	1 September 2018 (League Two with Cheltenham Town)	0	0	Accrington Stanley
(Montenegro)	Matija Sarkic	23 July 1997	Goalkeeper	24 October 2017 (EFL Trophy with Wigan Athletic)	0	0	Deceased, 15 June 2024
(Wales)	Mitch Clark	13 March 1999	Defender	22 August 2017 (vs Wigan Athletic)	1	0	Swindon Town
(Pakistan)	Easah Suliman	26 January 1998	Defender	22 August 2017 (vs Wigan Athletic)	3	0	(Azerbaijan) Sumgayit & Pakistan
(Republic of Ireland)	Jake Doyle-Hayes	30 December 1998	Midfielder	22 August 2017 (vs Wigan Athletic)	3	0	Exeter City
(England)	Callum O'Hare	1 May 1998	Midfielder	9 August 2017 (vs Colchester United)	9	0	Sheffield United
(England)	Corey Blackett-Taylor	23 September 1997	Midfielder	7 March 2017 (vs Huddersfield Town)	2	0	Derby County
(England)	Keinan Davis	13 February 1998	Forward	8 January 2017 (vs Tottenham Hotspur)	87	7	(Italy) Udinese
(Australia)	Jordan Lyden	30 January 1996	Midfielder	24 September 2016 (League Two with Stevenage)	8	0	Bromsgrove Sporting
(England)	Henry Cowans	6 September 1995	Midfielder	31 August 2016 (EFL Trophy with Stevenage)	0	0	Unattached
(England)	Niall Mason	10 January 1997	Defender	6 August 2016 (League Two with Doncaster Rovers)	0	0	Qatar SC
(Republic of Ireland)	Kevin Toner	18 July 1996	Defender	23 April 2016 (vs Southampton)	4	0	(Spain) Minera
(England)	Jerell Sellars	11 December 1995	Forward	2 April 2016 (League Two with Wycombe Wanderers)	0	0	Unattached
(England)	Andre Green	26 July 1998	Forward	13 March 2016 (vs Tottenham Hotspur)	48	2	(Portugal) AVS
(England)	Harry McKirdy	29 March 1997	Forward	9 January 2016 (vs Wycombe Wanderers)	6	0	Unattached
(England)	Riccardo Calder	26 January 1996	Midfielder	12 September 2015 (Scottish Premiership with Dundee)	0	0	Tamworth
(England)	Daniel Crowley	3 August 1997	Midfielder	9 August 2015 (League One with Barnsley)	0	0	Milton Keynes Dons
(England)	Lewis Kinsella	2 February 1994	Defender	28 March 2015 (League Two with Luton Town)	0	0	Retired
(England)	Rushian Hepburn-Murphy	24 August 1998	Forward	14 March 2015 (vs Sunderland)	17	0	Milton Keynes Dons
(Hungary)	András Stieber	8 October 1991	Midfielder	27 September 2014 (Nemzeti Bajnokság I with Győri ETO)	0	0	(Austria) FC Andau
(Saint Lucia)	Janoi Donacien	3 November 1993	Defender	30 August 2014 (League Two with Tranmere Rovers)	0	0	Northampton Town & Saint Lucia
(England)	Jack Grealish	10 September 1995	Midfielder	7 May 2014 (vs Manchester City)	212	33	Manchester City & England
(Switzerland)	Benjamin Siegrist	31 January 1992	Goalkeeper	26 March 2014 (Conference Premier with Cambridge United)	0	0	Unattached
(Republic of Ireland)	Michael Drennan	2 September 1994	Forward	18 January 2014 (League One with Carlisle United)	0	0	Retired
(England)	Jordan Graham	5 March 1995	Midfielder	7 December 2013 (Championship with Ipswich Town)	0	0	Unattached
(Turkey)	Umit Eminoglu	14 September 1994	Midfielder	25 September 2013 (Turkish Cup with Gençlerbirliği)	0	0	Retired
(England)	Callum Robinson	2 February 1995	Forward	24 September 2013 (vs Tottenham Hotspur)	5	0	(Wales) Cardiff City
(Australia)	Reece Caira	7 January 1993	Defender	27 December 2012 (A-League with Western Sydney Wanderers)	0	0	(Australia) Berkeley Vale Wombats
(Republic of Ireland)	Derrick Williams	17 January 1993	Defender	1 December 2012 (vs QPR)	1	0	Retired
(Jamaica)	Daniel Johnson	8 October 1992	Midfielder	23 October 2012 (League One with Yeovil Town)	0	0	(Turkey) Fatih Karagümrük & Jamaica
(Republic of Ireland)	Graham Burke	21 September 1993	Forward	28 August 2012 (vs Tranmere Rovers)	0	0	Shamrock Rovers & Republic of Ireland
(Republic of Ireland)	Samir Carruthers	4 April 1993	Midfielder	7 April 2012 (vs Liverpool)	3	0	Dulwich Hamlet
(England)	Gary Gardner	29 June 1992	Midfielder	31 December 2011 (vs Chelsea)	33	1	Cambridge United
(England)	Nathan Baker	23 April 1991	Defender	25 January 2011 (vs Wigan Athletic)	122	1	Retired
(Australia)	Chris Herd	4 April 1989	Midfielder	13 November 2010 (vs Manchester United)	42	2	Retired
(England)	Jonathan Hogg	6 December 1988	Midfielder	13 November 2010 (vs Manchester United)	7	0	Retired
(England)	Harry Forrester	2 January 1991	Midfielder	11 September 2010 (Scottish Premier League with Kilmarnock)	0	0	Retired
(United States)	Eric Lichaj	17 November 1988	Defender	19 August 2010 (vs Rapid Vienna)	42	2	Retired
(Austria)	Andreas Weimann	5 August 1991	Forward	14 August 2010 (vs West Ham United)	113	17	Cheltenham Town & Austria

=== 2000s ===
	Player	DOB	Position	First-Team Debut	First-Team Appearances	First-Team Goals	Current Team
(England)	James Collins	1 December 1990	Forward	24 October 2009 (League Two with Darlington F.C.)	0	0	Lincoln City
(Republic of Ireland)	Ciaran Clark	26 September 1989	Defender	30 August 2009 (vs Fulham)	159	10	Retired
(Australia)	Shane Lowry	12 June 1989	Defender	20 August 2009 (vs Rapid Vienna)	3	0	(Malaysia) Johor Darul Ta'zim
(England)	Marc Albrighton	18 November 1989	Midfielder	26 February 2009 (vs CSKA Moscow)	101	9	Retired
(Scotland)	Barry Bannan	1 December 1989	Midfielder	17 December 2008 (vs Hamburger SV)	83	2	Sheffield Wednesday & Scotland
(England)	Nathan Delfouneso	2 February 1991	Forward	14 August 2008 (vs FH)	50	9	Unattached
(Sweden)	Tobias Mikaelsson	17 November 1988	Forward	19 January 2008 (League One with Port Vale)	0	0	(Sweden) Vallens
(Austria)	Bobby Olejnik	26 November 1986	Goalkeeper	24 November 2007 (Scottish Premier League with Falkirk)	0	0	Retired
(Hungary)	Zoltán Stieber	16 October 1988	Midfielder	24 November 2007 (League Two with Yeovil Town F.C.)	0	0	Unattached & Hungary
(England)	Daniel Sturridge	1 September 1989	Forward	3 February 2007 (Premier League with Manchester City)	0	0	Retired
(Republic of Ireland)	Stephen O'Halloran	29 November 1987	Defender	31 October 2006 (League Two with Wycombe Wanderers)	0	0	Retired
(England)	Isaiah Osbourne	15 November 1987	Midfielder	21 October 2006 (vs Fulham)	30	0	Barwell
(England)	Gary Cahill	19 December 1985	Defender	1 April 2006 (vs Arsenal)	31	1	Retired
(England)	Gabriel Agbonlahor	13 October 1986	Forward	18 March 2006 (vs Everton)	391	86	Retired
(Northern Ireland)	Jamie Ward	12 May 1986	Forward	7 March 2006 (League Two with Stockport County F.C.)	0	0	Unattached & Northern Ireland
(England)	Craig Gardner	25 November 1986	Midfielder	26 December 2005 (vs Everton)	80	6	Retired
(Northern Ireland)	Steven Davis	1 January 1985	Midfielder	18 September 2004 (vs Norwich City)	102	9	Retired
(England)	James O'Connor	25 November 1986	Defender	4 September 2004 (League One with Port Vale F.C.)	0	0	Retired
(Republic of Ireland)	Wayne Henderson	16 September 1983	Goalkeeper	13 March 2004 (Conference Premier with Tamworth F.C.)	0	0	Retired
(England)	Luke Moore	13 February 1986	Forward	22 February 2004 (vs Birmingham City)	98	14	Retired
(England)	Peter Whittingham	8 September 1984	Midfielder	23 April 2003 (vs Newcastle United)	66	2	Deceased, 19 March 2020
(England)	Liam Ridgewell	21 July 1984	Defender	4 January 2003 (vs Blackburn Rovers)	93	7	Retired
(Wales)	Rob Edwards	25 December 1982	Defender	28 December 2002 (vs Middlesbrough)	9	0	Retired
(Wales)	Boaz Myhill	9 November 1982	Goalkeeper	30 November 2002 (Division One with Bradford City F.C.)	0	0	Retired
(England)	Stefan Moore	28 September 1983	Forward	11 September 2002 (vs Charlton Athletic)	30	2	Retired
(Germany)	Thomas Hitzlsperger	5 April 1982	Midfielder	13 January 2001 (vs Liverpool)	114	12	Retired
(England)	Stephen Cooke	15 February 1982	Midfielder	2 August 2000 (vs Celta de Vigo)	4	0	Retired
(England)	Jonathan Bewers	10 September 1982	Defender	15 April 2000 (vs Tottenham Hotspur)	1	0	Retired

=== 1990s ===
	Player	DOB	Position	First-Team Debut	First-Team Appearances	First-Team Goals	Current Team
(England)	Aaron Lescott	2 December 1978	Defender	2 January 1999 (vs Hull City)	1	0	Retired
(England)	Adam Rachel	10 December 1976	Goalkeeper	26 December 1998 (vs Blackburn Rovers)	1	0	Retired
(England)	Tommy Jaszczun	16 September 1977	Defender	28 October 1998 (vs Chelsea)	1	0	Retired
(England)	Darius Vassell	13 June 1980	Forward	23 August 1998 (vs Middlesbrough)	201	45	Retired
(England)	Gareth Barry	23 February 1981	Midfielder	2 May 1998 (vs Sheffield Wednesday)	441	52	Retired
(Jamaica)	Darren Byfield	29 September 1979	Forward	28 December 1997 (vs Leeds United)	10	0	Retired
(England)	Richard Walker	8 November 1977	Forward	28 December 1997 (vs Leeds United)	10	2	Retired
(England)	Lee Hendrie	18 May 1977	Midfielder	23 December 1995 (vs Queens Park Rangers)	308	32	Retired
(Republic of Ireland)	Gareth Farrelly	28 August 1975	Midfielder	20 September 1995 (vs Peterborough United)	8	0	Retired
(England)	Riccardo Scimeca	13 June 1975	Defender	19 August 1995 (vs Manchester United)	88	2	Retired
