= Callum Rowe =

English footballer (born 1999)

Personal information
- Full name: Callum Miles Rowe
- Date of birth: 2 September 1999 (age 27)
- Place of birth: Leicester, England
- Positions: Left-back; midfielder

Team information
- Current team: Chorley

Youth career
- –2021: Aston Villa

Senior career*
Years	Team	Apps	(Gls)
2021	Aston Villa	0	(0)
2021	→ Hereford (loan)	0	(0)
2021–2022	Exeter City	8	(0)
2021	→ Chippenham Town (loan)	3	(0)
2022	→ Bath City (loan)	7	(0)
2022	Yeovil Town	4	(0)
2022	Salisbury	1	(0)
2022	Hereford	2	(0)
2023	Stourbridge	13	(1)
2023–2024	Rushall Olympic	1	(0)
2023–2024	→ Redditch United (dual-registration)	25	(3)
2024–2025	Radcliffe	7	(0)
2024–2025	→ Ashton United (dual-registration)	21	(0)
2025–2026	Ashton United	0	(0)
2026–	Chorley	0	(0)
- * Club domestic league appearances and goals as of 11:48, 2 June 2025 (UTC)

Callum Miles Rowe (born 2 September 1999) is an English professional footballer who plays as a midfielder or left-back for Chorley.

== Career ==
=== Aston Villa ===
Born in Leicester, Rowe was named in the Aston Villa starting line-up for his senior debut on 8 January 2021 in an FA Cup third-round tie against Liverpool after "a large number of first-team players and staff" tested positive for COVID-19, rendering Villa's first-team squad unavailable for the match. Villa exceeded expectations by losing just 4–1, with Rowe providing the assist for Louie Barry to score their only goal in the 41st minute.

On 16 January 2021, Rowe joined Hereford in the National League North on loan for the rest of the season. He made his Hereford debut on 20 January, in a 2–0 victory at Stamford in the FA Trophy. On 18 February 2021, the National League North season was ended early, with the season being declared null & void - due to a resurgence of the COVID-19 pandemic in the UK. Rowe stayed on loan with Hereford to take part in their FA Trophy campaign which was ongoing. However, Rowe did not feature in the Hereford squad that lost the final 3–1 to Hornchurch at Wembley Stadium.

On 4 June 2021, Rowe was released by Aston Villa.

=== Exeter City ===
On 28 June 2021, Callum Rowe signed for Exeter City in League Two. He made his league debut on 14 August 2021 as a substitute in a 3–0 defeat to Leyton Orient.

On 10 November 2021, Rowe joined National League South side Chippenham Town on a short-term loan until 7 December. He made his Chippenham debut in a 3–0 victory over Billericay Town on 13 November.

On 25 January 2022, Rowe returned to the National League South, joining Bath City on loan until the end of the season. He made his Bath debut the same day as his transfer was announced, losing 4–0 to Hampton & Richmond Borough. Rowe was released by Exeter at the end of the 2021–22 season following their promotion.

Following his release from Exeter, Rowe began training with Scottish Championship team Dundee, and appeared in a pre-season friendly against Blackburn Rovers on 13 July 2022.

=== Yeovil Town ===
On 26 August 2022, Rowe signed for National League side Yeovil Town on a short-term deal.

On 4 November 2022, Rowe left Yeovil Town after his short-term deal expired.

=== Salisbury ===
On 5 November 2022, Rowe signed for Salisbury, and made his debut later that day in a 3–1 defeat against Weston-super-Mare.

=== Return to Hereford ===
On 12 November 2022, Rowe returned to Hereford, and made his second debut for the club the same day in a 1–0 win at AFC Telford. He was released on 9 January 2023 after making only two league appearances.

=== Stourbridge ===
On 24 February 2023, Rowe signed for Southern League Premier Division Central side Stourbridge.

=== Rushall Olympic ===
On 4 August 2023, Rowe signed for National League North side Rushall Olympic.

Having spent a large portion of the 2023–24 season on dual-registration with Redditch United, Rowe returned to Rushall Olympic in August 2024 following shoulder surgery.

=== Radcliffe ===
On 28 August 2024, Rowe joined fellow National League North side Radcliffe.

On 16 November 2024, Rowe joined Northern Premier League Premier Division side Ashton United on dual-registration.

He was released by Radcliffe at the end of the 2024–25 season.

=== Chorley ===
Rowe spent the 2025/26 season with Ashton United before joining National League North club Chorley in June 2026.

== Career statistics ==
As of end of 2024–25 season

Appearances and goals by club, season and competition
Club	Season	League			FA Cup		EFL Cup		Other		Total	
Club	Season	Division	Apps	Goals	Apps	Goals	Apps	Goals	Apps	Goals	Apps	Goals
Aston Villa U21	2019–20	—			—		—		2 (Note: Appearance(s) in EFL Trophy)	0	2	0
Aston Villa U21	2020–21	—			—		—		1	0	1	0
Aston Villa U21	Total		—		—		—		3	0	3	0
Aston Villa	2020–21	Premier League	0	0	1	0	0	0	—		1	0
Hereford (loan)	2020–21	National League North	0	0	0	0	—		2 (Note: Appearance(s) in FA Trophy)	0	2	0
Exeter City	2021–22	League Two	8	0	0	0	0	0	2	0	10	0
Chippenham Town (loan)	2021–22	National League South	3	0	0	0	—		1	0	4	0
Bath City (loan)	2021–22	National League South	7	0	0	0	—		1 (Note: Appearance in Somerset Premier Cup)	0	8	0
Yeovil Town	2022–23	National League	4	0	1	0	—		0	0	5	0
Salisbury	2022–23	Southern League; Premier Division South	1	0	—		—		—		1	0
Hereford	2022–23	National League North	2	0	—		—		0	0	2	0
Stourbridge	2022–23	Southern League Premier Division Central	13	1	0	0	—		2 (Note: Appearance(s) in Birmingham Senior Cup)	1	15	2
Rushall Olympic	2023–24	National League North	1	0	0	0	—		0	0	1	0
Redditch United (dual-registration)	2023–24	Southern League Premier Division Central	25	3	3	0	—		5 (Note: Three appearances in FA Trophy, one appearance in Birmingham Senior Cup, one appearance in Worcestershire Senior Cup)	0	33	3
Radcliffe	2024–25	National League North	7	0	2	0	—		0	0	9	0
Ashton United (dual-registration)	2024–25	NPL Premier Division	21	0	0	0	—		1 (Note: Appearance(s) in Northern Premier League Premier Division play-offs)	0	22	0
Career total			92	4	7	0	0	0	17	1	115	5
