= Sebastian Revan =

English footballer (born 2003)

Personal information
- Full name: Sebastian Emmanuel Revan
- Date of birth: 14 July 2003 (age 23)
- Place of birth: West Bromwich, England
- Height: 5 ft 11 in (1.81 m)
- Position: Left-back

Team information
- Current team: Wrexham
- Number: 23

Youth career
- 2012–2021: Aston Villa

Senior career*
Years	Team	Apps	(Gls)
2020–2024	Aston Villa	0	(0)
2021	→ Grimsby Town (loan)	7	(0)
2022	→ Hereford (loan)	24	(1)
2023–2024	→ Rotherham United (loan)	36	(1)
2024–	Wrexham	19	(0)
2025–2026	→ Burton Albion (loan)	15	(0)
- * Club domestic league appearances and goals as of 16 April 2026 (UTC)

Sebastian Revan (born 14 July 2003) is an English professional footballer who plays as a left-back for EFL Championship club Wrexham.

A product of the Aston Villa academy, he featured for Villa's U21s in the EFL Trophy in 2020–21 and was also part of the winning FA Youth Cup team of the same season. He has been called up to represent the England national under-18 football team, but was not capped. During the 2020–21 season he was loaned to both Grimsby Town and Hereford. He made his senior debut for Villa in the Europa Conference League in August 2023.

== Early life ==
He joined the Aston Villa youth academy at the age of 8. His older brother, Dominic, is also a professional footballer and they were in the Aston Villa Academy together until 2022.

Sebastian is of St. Kitts and Nevis descent via his grandfather.

== Club career ==
=== Youth career ===
Revan made his competitive Aston Villa debut in the EFL Trophy on 8 September 2020 in what turned out to be a heavy 8–1 defeat for the U21 side at the Stadium of Light against Sunderland. Revan played the full 90 minutes alongside his brother Dominic in defence. He also played in Villa U21's EFL defeats against Fleetwood Town and Carlisle United.

After being a regular starter in Mark Delaney's Under 23 team he was awarded a full professional contract on 3 March 2021.

On 24 May 2021, Revan played the full 90 minutes in Villa's FA Youth Cup final win over Liverpool, a deflected shot cannoned off Revan and into the back of the net to give Liverpool a late goal but Villa held out to win the game 2–1.

=== Aston Villa ===
In July 2021, Revan played in Villa's first team during their first two pre-season friendlies against Stoke City and Walsall

On 28 July 2021, Revan signed for Grimsby Town on a season-long loan. Revan made his National League debut for Grimsby in a 0–0 draw against Stockport County on 31 August 2021. On 16 October 2021, he scored his first senior goals as he scored twice in a 5–0 win away at Bromsgrove Sporting in the FA Cup. He was recalled by Villa in January 2022.

On 14 January 2022, Revan joined National League North club Hereford on loan until the end of the season.

On 4 April 2023, Revan appeared in a Premier League squad for the first time, as an unused substitute in a 2–1 away victory over Leicester City. He again featured with the first team in the summer of 2023, making multiple appearances in the Premier League Summer Series pre-season tournament in the United States. In August 2023, he was an unused substitute in Villa's UEFA Europa Conference League qualifying play-off first leg against Hibernian. He made his senior competitive debut for Villa in the second leg, playing the full 90 minutes.

On 1 September 2023, the day after his Aston Villa senior debut, Revan signed a contract extension and joined Championship club Rotherham United on a season-long loan. On 20 September 2023, Revan made his English Football League debut in a 3–0 defeat to Millwall. On 1 April 2024, he scored his first Rotherham goal against Millwall.

=== Wrexham ===
On 15 July 2024, Revan signed with newly-promoted EFL League One club Wrexham for an undisclosed fee. Revan made his Wrexham debut as a late substitute in a 3–2 league victory over Wycombe Wanderers on 10 August 2024. On 13 August, Revan scored his first goal for Wrexham in a 4–2 away defeat to Sheffield United in the EFL Cup.

On 13 August 2025, Revan returned to League One following Wrexham's promotion, joining Burton Albion on a season-long loan.

== International career ==
In October 2020, Revan was called up to the England national under-18 football team by Kevin Betsy.

Sebastian is eligible to represent St. Kitts and Nevis at the international level.

== Career statistics ==
=== Club ===
As of match played 14 February 2026

Appearances and goals by club, season and competition
Club	Season	League			FA Cup		League Cup		Other		Total	
Club	Season	Division	Apps	Goals	Apps	Goals	Apps	Goals	Apps	Goals	Apps	Goals
Aston Villa	2020–21	Premier League	0	0	0	0	0	0	3 (Note: Appearance(s) in EFL Trophy)	0	3	0
Aston Villa	2021–22	Premier League	0	0	0	0	0	0	0	0	0	0
Aston Villa	2022–23	Premier League	0	0	0	0	0	0	2	1	2	1
Aston Villa	2023–24	Premier League	0	0	0	0	0	0	1 (Note: Appearance(s) in UEFA Europa Conference League)	0	1	0
Aston Villa	Total		0	0	0	0	0	0	6	1	6	1
Grimsby Town (loan)	2021–22	National League	7	0	2	2	—		1 (Note: Appearance(s) in FA Trophy)	0	10	2
Hereford (loan)	2021–22	National League North	24	1	—		—		—		24	1
Rotherham United (loan)	2023–24	Championship	36	1	1	0	—		—		37	1
Wrexham	2024–25	League One	19	0	1	0	1	1	6	0	27	1
Wrexham	2025–26	Championship	0	0	0	0	0	0	0	0	0	0
Wrexham	2026–27	Championship	0	0	0	0	0	0	0	0	0	0
Wrexham	Total		19	0	1	0	1	1	6	0	27	1
Burton Albion (loan)	2025–26	League One	15	0	1	0	1	0	1	0	18	0
Career total			101	2	5	2	2	1	13	1	121	6

== Honours ==
Aston Villa

- FA Youth Cup: 2020–21

Wrexham

- EFL League One runner up: 2024-25
