= Richard Beale =

Richard Beale may refer to:

- Richard Beale Blaize (1845–1904), Nigerian-Sierra Leonean businessman
- Richard Beale Davis (1907–1981), American academic
- Richard Beale (actor) (1920–2017), British actor
- Richard Beale (footballer) (born 1979), English footballer and manager
- Richard L. T. Beale (1819–1893), American congressman and Confederate general
