= Christian Moses =

Sierra Leonean footballer (born 1993)

Personal information
- Date of birth: 10 August 1993 (age 33)
- Place of birth: Freetown, Sierra Leone
- Height: 1.81 m (5 ft 11 1/2 in)
- Position: Forward

Team information
- Current team: Örebro Syrianska IF
- Number: 7

Senior career*
Years	Team	Apps	(Gls)
2011–2013	Juventus IF	45	(25)
2014–2016	Kallon		
2016–2018	FC Lion Pride		
2017	→ Vendsyssel FF (loan)	12	(1)
2017	→ Vendsyssel FF (loan)	19	(9)
2018	→ Viborg FF (loan)	12	(3)
2018–2020	Viborg FF	32	(3)
2020–2021	FC Linköping City	26	(15)
2021–2022	IFK Värnamo	19	(5)
2022	Örebro SK	10	(1)
2023	Vasalunds IF	29	(7)
2024	Assyriska FF	30	(13)
2025	Vasalunds IF	16	(3)
2025–	Örebro Syrianska IF	9	(3)

International career^{‡}
2015–	Sierra Leone	6	(0)
- * Club domestic league appearances and goals as of 24 November 2025 ‡ National team caps and goals as of 00:42, 30 December 2021 (UTC)

Christian Moses (born 10 August 1993) is a Sierra Leonean footballer who plays as a forward for Örebro Syrianska IF.

== Club career ==
Born in Freetown, Moses played for Juventus IF, Kallon and FC Lion Pride before joining Vendsyssel FF on loan from the latter on 31 January 2017, in a loan deal lasting until 30 June 2017, and rejoined the club on loan until the end of 2017.

In January 2018, Moses signed for Danish 1st Division side Viborg FF on loan from FC Lion Pride. He joined the club on a permanent basis in August 2018, signing a two-and-a-half-year deal with the club. In January 2020, Moses joined Icelandic club Knattspyrnufélagið Víkingur on a trial period. In August 2020 Viborg confirmed that Moses had left the club to join an unnamed Swedish club, with him signing a one-and-a-half-year contract with FC Linköping City in September 2020.

In July 2021, Moses signed for Superettan club IFK Värnamo. He scored 5 goals in 15 games as Värnamo won the 2021 Superettan.

== International career ==
He made his debut for Sierra Leone on 6 September 2015 in a 0–0 draw with Ivory Coast.

== Career statistics ==
=== Club ===
As of end of 2021 season

Appearances and goals by club, season and competition
Club	Season	League			Cup		Other		Total	
Club	Season	Division	Apps	Goals	Apps	Goals	Apps	Goals	Apps	Goals
Juventus IF	2011	Division 4	6	4	—		0	0	6	4
Juventus IF	2012	Division 3	19	11	—		0	0	19	11
Juventus IF	2013	Division 3	20	10	—		0	0	20	10
Juventus IF	Total		45	25	0	0	0	0	45	25
Vendsyssel FF (loan)	2016–17	Danish 1st Division	12	1	2	1	1 (Note: Appearance(s) in promotion play-offs)	0	15	2
Vendsyssel FF (loan)	2017–18	Danish 1st Division	19	9	0	0	0	0	19	9
Vendsyssel FF (loan)	Total		31	10	2	1	1	0	34	11
Viborg FF	2017–18	Danish 1st Division	12	3	0	0	0	0	12	3
Viborg FF	2018–19	Danish 1st Division	20	3	0	0	1	0	21	3
Viborg FF	2019–20	Danish 1st Division	12	0	0	0	0	0	12	0
Viborg FF	Total		44	6	0	0	1	0	45	6
FC Linköping City	2020	Ettan Fotboll	13	7	0	0	0	0	13	7
FC Linköping City	2021	Ettan Fotboll	13	8	0	0	0	0	13	8
FC Linköping City	Total		26	15	0	0	0	0	26	15
IFK Värnamo	2021	Superettan	15	5	1	0	0	0	16	5
Total			161	61	3	1	2	0	166	62

=== International ===
As of match played 13 November 2021

Appearances and goals by national team and year
National team	Year	Apps	Goals
Sierra Leone	2015	3	0
Sierra Leone	2018	1	0
Sierra Leone	2021	2	0
Total		6	0

== Honours ==
Vendsyssel FF

- Danish 1st Division runner-up: 2016–17

Viborg FF

- Danish 1st Division runner-up: 2018–19, 2019–20

IFK Värnamo

- Superettan: 2021
