= Lamare Bogarde =

Dutch footballer (born 2004)

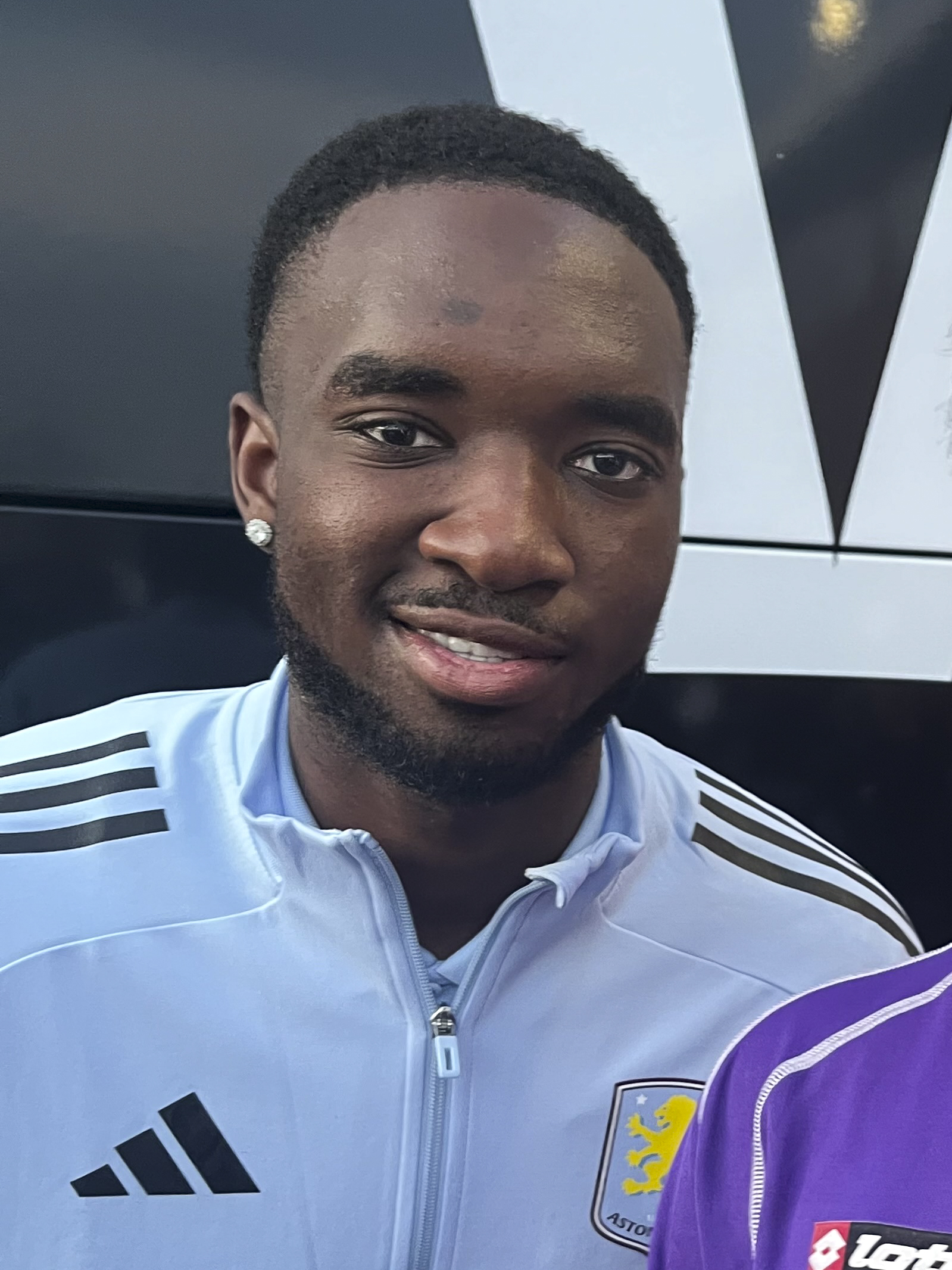
- Bogarde in 2025 with Aston Villa

Personal information
- Full name: Lamare Trenton Chansey Bogarde
- Date of birth: 5 January 2004 (age 22)
- Place of birth: Rotterdam, Netherlands
- Height: 1.83 m (6 ft 0 in)
- Positions: Right-back; defensive midfielder

Team information
- Current team: Aston Villa
- Number: 26

Youth career
- –2020: Feyenoord
- 2020–2021: Aston Villa

Senior career*
Years	Team	Apps	(Gls)
2021–	Aston Villa	37	(0)
2023	→ Bristol Rovers (loan)	18	(0)
2023–2024	→ Bristol Rovers (loan)	14	(0)

International career^{‡}
2019	Netherlands U15	3	(0)
2020	Netherlands U16	2	(0)
2021	Netherlands U18	2	(0)
2023	Netherlands U20	1	(0)
2025–	Netherlands U21	4	(0)
- * Club domestic league appearances and goals as of 16:16, 23 August 2026 (UTC) ‡ National team caps and goals as of 09:15, 1 April 2026 (UTC)

Lamare Trenton Chansey Bogarde (born 5 January 2004) is a Dutch footballer who plays as a right-back or defensive midfielder for Premier League club Aston Villa. He is a youth international for the Netherlands, having played at under-15, under-16, under-18 and under-20 levels.

== Early life ==
Bogarde was born in Rotterdam on 5 January 2004.

== Club career ==
=== Aston Villa ===
The 16-year-old Bogarde joined Aston Villa from Feyenoord's academy in September 2020. He was named in the Aston Villa starting line-up for his senior debut on 8 January 2021 in an FA Cup third-round tie against Liverpool. On 12 January 2021, after impressing in his debut, Bogarde was given his first professional contract at Aston Villa.

On 24 May 2021, Bogarde was part of the Aston Villa U18s team that won the FA Youth Cup, beating Liverpool U18s 2–1 in the final.

On 1 July 2022, Bogarde signed a new, long-term contract with Aston Villa. In the same summer, Bogarde was part of a first team squad for a pre-season tour of Australia.

==== Bristol Rovers (loans) ====
On 31 January 2023, Bogarde joined EFL League One club Bristol Rovers on loan for the remainder of the season. On 4 February, Bogarde made his English Football League debut as a late substitute in a 2–0 defeat to MK Dons. Following an initially difficult start to his time with the club for the team, Bogarde cemented his place in the team in a central midfield position, impressing manager Joey Barton whom had never watched him play prior to his transfer to the club.

On 18 August 2023, Bogarde returned to Bristol Rovers on a season-long loan deal. Having been linked with Championship club Southampton earlier in the transfer window, it was the League One club that were entrusted with continuing his development following a positive loan spell the previous season. Having found game time limited, especially since the replacement of Joey Barton as manager with Matt Taylor, there were rumours of Bogarde's loan being terminated in the January transfer window to facilitate a move to a Championship club. Lamare was recalled to Aston Villa on 4 January 2024.

==== Return to Aston Villa ====
On 17 July 2024, Bogarde made an appearance for Aston Villa during a 3–0 friendly win against EFL League Two club Walsall. On 20 August 2024, Bogarde signed a new contract with Aston Villa and was moved into the first team squad.

On 31 August 2024, Bogarde made his Premier League debut, starting a 2–1 away victory over Leicester City. And was ultimately named in BBC Sport's Team of the Week. Bogarde started Villa's first Champions League in 41 years against Swiss club Young Boys in a 3–0 win. Over the first half of the 2024–25 season, Bogarde became somewhat of a utility player for Aston Villa, filling in at centre back, right back and his natural position of defensive midfield as injuries and other absences called for him to do so.

On 7 April 2025, Bogarde signed a contract extension with Aston Villa.

== International career ==
Lamare Bogarde has been capped at several youth levels for the Netherlands between 2019 and 2023 at under-15, under-16, under-18 and under-20 levels.

Bogarde received a Netherlands U21 call-up in March 2025 alongside his Villa teammate Ian Maatsen. On 21 March 2025, Bogarde made his debut for the U21s in a 2–1 friendly victory over Italy, in which he was sent off for two bookable offences, one of two red cards the Netherlands received on the night.

== Style of play ==
Predominantly a defensive midfielder, Bogarde can also be deployed as a centre-back, and has frequently played as a right-back under Unai Emery.

== Personal life ==
Born in the Netherlands, Bogarde is of Surinamese descent. He is the brother of Melayro Bogarde and the nephew of Winston Bogarde, both professional footballers.

== Career statistics ==
As of match played 28 October 2026

Appearances and goals by club, season and competition
Club	Season	League			FA Cup		EFL Cup		Europe		Other		Total	
Club	Season	Division	Apps	Goals	Apps	Goals	Apps	Goals	Apps	Goals	Apps	Goals	Apps	Goals
Aston Villa U21	2020–21	—			—		—		—		1 (Note: Appearance(s) in EFL Trophy)	0	1	0
Aston Villa U21	2021–22	—			—		—		—		4	0	4	0
Aston Villa U21	2022–23	—			—		—		—		1	0	1	0
Aston Villa U21	2024–25	—			—		—		—		1	0	1	0
Aston Villa U21	Total		—		—		—		—		7	0	7	0
Aston Villa	2020–21	Premier League	0	0	1	0	0	0	—		—		1	0
Aston Villa	2021–22	Premier League	0	0	0	0	0	0	—		—		0	0
Aston Villa	2022–23	Premier League	0	0	0	0	0	0	—		—		0	0
Aston Villa	2023–24	Premier League	0	0	—		—		0	0	—		0	0
Aston Villa	2024–25	Premier League	8	0	2	0	2	0	4 (Note: Appearances in UEFA Champions League)	0	—		16	0
Aston Villa	2025–26	Premier League	28	0	2	0	1	0	13 (Note: Appearances in UEFA Europa League)	0	—		44	0
Aston Villa	2026–27	Premier League	1	0	0	0	2	0	1	0	1 (Note: Appearance in UEFA Super Cup)	0	5	0
Aston Villa	Total		37	0	5	0	5	0	18	0	1	0	66	0
Bristol Rovers (loan)	2022–23	League One	18	0	—		—		—		—		18	0
Bristol Rovers (loan)	2023–24	League One	14	0	1	0	—		—		3	0	18	0
Career total			69	0	6	0	5	0	18	0	11	0	109	0

== Honours ==
Aston Villa U18

- FA Youth Cup: 2020–21

Aston Villa U21

- Birmingham Senior Cup: 2023–24

Aston Villa

- UEFA Europa League: 2025–26
