= Dominic Revan =

English footballer (born 2000)

Personal information
- Full name: Dominic Revan
- Date of birth: 19 September 2000 (age 26)
- Place of birth: West Bromwich, England
- Height: 5 ft 11 in (1.80 m)
- Position: Defender

Team information
- Current team: Salisbury
- Number: 24

Youth career
- 2008–2021: Aston Villa

Senior career*
Years	Team	Apps	(Gls)
2021–2022	Aston Villa	0	(0)
2021	→ Weymouth (loan)	16	(0)
2021–2022	→ Northampton Town (loan)	3	(0)
2022–2024	Barnet	17	(0)
2023	→ Banbury United (loan)	6	(0)
2023–2024	→ Hampton & Richmond Borough (loan)	4	(0)
2024–2025	Hampton & Richmond Borough	55	(0)
2025–	Salisbury	43	(1)
- * Club domestic league appearances and goals as of 13:07, 07 May 2026 (UTC)

Dominic Revan (born 19 September 2000) is an English footballer who plays as a defender for National League South club Salisbury. Revan is a product of the Aston Villa Academy.

== Early life ==
Revan was born in West Bromwich. He joined the Aston Villa youth academy at the age of 8. His younger brother, Sebastian also joined the Aston Villa academy.

Dominic is of St.Kitts and Nevis descent through his grandfather.

== Career ==
=== Aston Villa ===
Revan was named in the Aston Villa starting line-up for his senior debut on 8 January 2021 in an FA Cup third round tie against Liverpool.

On 15 January 2021, Revan joined Weymouth of the National League on loan for the rest of the season. The following day, Revan made his Weymouth debut in a 1–0 home defeat to Darlington in the FA Trophy. On 10 April 2021, Revan suffered a broken jaw in a National League match against Torquay United. On 26 April, the injury led to his loan spell being cut short and Revan returned to Aston Villa.

On 31 August 2021, Revan joined League Two side Northampton Town on loan until January 2022. He made six appearances in an injury-hit loan spell, before returning to Aston Villa.

On 10 June 2022, Revan was released by Aston Villa.

=== Barnet ===
On 2 September 2022, Revan signed for National League club Barnet. He made his debut in a 3–1 defeat to Aldershot Town the following day. Revan scored his first goal in senior football on 15 October 2022, in a 3–0 victory over Weston-super-Mare in the FA Cup. Revan joined Banbury United on a one-month loan on 25 August 2023.

On 15 December 2023, he joined Hampton & Richmond Borough on an initial one-month loan deal. On 16 January 2024, he joined the club on a permanent basis for an undisclosed fee.

=== Salisbury ===
In June 2025, Revan joined National League South side Salisbury. He went on to make 43 appearances in his first season with The Whites, scoring once.

== Career statistics ==
As of end of 2024–25 season

Appearances and goals by club, season and competition
Club	Season	League			FA Cup		League Cup		Other		Total	
Club	Season	Division	Apps	Goals	Apps	Goals	Apps	Goals	Apps	Goals	Apps	Goals
Aston Villa U21	2019–20	–							2 (Note: Appearance(s) in EFL Trophy)	0	2	0
Aston Villa U21	2020–21	–							3	0	3	0
Aston Villa U21	Total		0	0	0	0	0	0	5	0	5	0
Aston Villa	2020–21	Premier League	0	0	1	0	0	0	0	0	1	0
Aston Villa	2021–22	Premier League	0	0	0	0	0	0	0	0	0	0
Aston Villa	Total		0	0	1	0	0	0	0	0	1	0
Weymouth (loan)	2020–21	National League	16	0	0	0	–		1 (Note: Appearance(s) in FA Trophy)	0	17	0
Northampton Town (loan)	2021–22	League Two	3	0	1	0	0	0	2	0	6	0
Barnet	2022–23	National League	12	0	1	1	–		1	0	14	1
Barnet	2023–24	National League	5	0	1	0	–		1 (Note: Appearances in Middlesex Senior Cup)	0	7	0
Barnet	Total		17	0	2	1	0	0	2	0	21	1
Banbury United (loan)	2023–24	National League North	6	0	0	0	–		0	0	6	0
Hampton & Richmond Borough (loan)	2023–24	National League South	4	0	0	0	–		0	0	4	0
Hampton & Richmond Borough	2023–24	National League South	17	0	0	0	–		1	0	18	0
Hampton & Richmond Borough	2024–25	National League South	38	0	1	0	–		3	0	42	0
Hampton & Richmond Borough	Total		55	0	1	0	0	0	4	0	60	0
Career total			101	0	5	1	0	0	14	0	120	1

== Honours ==
Aston Villa U23s

- Premier League Cup: 2017–18
