= Mamadou Sylla (footballer, born 2003) =

Senegalese footballer

Personal information
- Full name: Mamadou Sylla Diallo
- Date of birth: 26 January 2003 (age 23)
- Place of birth: Barcelona, Spain
- Height: 1.79 m (5 ft 10 in)
- Position: Midfielder

Team information
- Current team: Örebro Syrianska
- Number: 42

Youth career
- Granollers
- Canovelles
- 2018–2021: Aston Villa

Senior career*
Years	Team	Apps	(Gls)
2021	Aston Villa	0	(0)
2021–2023	Almería B	11	(0)
2023	→ Unión Molinense (loan)	8	(0)
2025–	Örebro Syrianska	19	(0)
- * Club domestic league appearances and goals as of 13 November 2025

Mamadou Sylla Diallo (born 26 January 2003) is a Spanish footballer who currently plays as a midfielder for Örebro Syrianska.

Sylla is a product of the Aston Villa Academy, having moved to England from his native Catalonia aged 15. He made his professional debut for Aston Villa in January 2021 against Liverpool in the FA Cup, and also won the FA Youth Cup with Aston Villa's Under-18 side in the 2020–21 campaign.

== Personal life ==
Sylla was born in Spain to Guinean parents.

== Career ==
Sylla was named in the Aston Villa starting line-up for his senior debut on 8 January 2021 in an FA Cup third-round tie against Liverpool. On 24 May 2021, he was part of the Aston Villa U18s squad that won the FA Youth Cup, beating Liverpool U18s 2–1 in the final.

On 23 August 2021, Sylla signed for Segunda División team UD Almería on a permanent transfer. He was moved to their B-Team, and made his league debut in the Tercera División RFEF on 12 September 2021, in a 0–0 draw against Huétor Tájar.

On 1 January 2023, Sylla signed for fellow Tercera Federación club Unión Molinense CF on loan until the end of the season.

On 11 February 2025, Sylla signed for Swedish Ettan (third tier) club Örebro Syrianska. He made his debut for the club on 29 March 2025, in a 1–0 victory over FC Arlanda.

== Career statistics ==
=== Club ===
As of match played 9 November 2025

Appearances and goals by club, season and competition
Club	Season	League			National cup		League cup		Other		Total	
Club	Season	Division	Apps	Goals	Apps	Goals	Apps	Goals	Apps	Goals	Apps	Goals
Aston Villa	2020–21	Premier League	0	0	1	0	0	0	0	0	1	0
Almería B	2021–22	Tercera División RFEF	11	0	0	0	0	0	0	0	11	0
Almería B	2022–23	Tercera División RFEF	0	0	0	0	0	0	0	0	0	0
Almería B	Total		11	0	0	0	0	0	0	0	11	0
Unión Molinense (loan)	2022–23	Tercera Federación	8	0	0	0	0	0	0	0	8	0
Örebro Syrianska	2025	Ettan Fotboll	19	0	0	0	–		0	0	19	0
Career total			38	0	1	0	0	0	0	0	39	0

== Honours ==
Aston Villa U18

- FA Youth Cup: 2020–21
