= Richard Beale (footballer) =

English football manager

Personal information
- Date of birth: 22 May 1979 (age 47)
- Place of birth: Solihull, England

Youth career
- Port Vale

Senior career*
Years	Team	Apps	(Gls)
- Solihull Borough
- Redditch
- Stafford Rangers

Managerial career
- 2014: Birmingham City (joint-caretaker)
- 2022: West Bromwich Albion (caretaker)
- * Club domestic league appearances and goals

Richard Beale (born 22 May 1979) is an English football manager and former player who is currently the Head Coach of Aston Villa Under-18s. He has worked for the youth teams of Birmingham City, Aston Villa and West Bromwich Albion, and was caretaker manager at Birmingham and West Brom.

== Career ==
Born in Solihull, Beale was an apprentice at Port Vale and later played non-League football for Solihull Borough, Redditch and Stafford Rangers.

A UEFA Pro Licence holder since 2016, Beale has a sports science degree from Coventry University. He worked in Birmingham City's academy from 2003. In November 2010, he was appointed in charge of the club's reserve team after holding the position on a caretaker basis. Players whom he worked with included Nathan Redmond, Demarai Gray, Jack Butland and Jordon Mutch.

In October 2014, Birmingham City sacked Lee Clark and put Beale and head scout Malcolm Crosby in caretaker charge. The duo lost their two Championship games, including a record 8–0 home loss to AFC Bournemouth, before Gary Rowett was hired.

In July 2019, after helping Birmingham City's under-23 team to second place in their league and a playoff final defeat on penalties to Leeds United, Beale moved to become under-18 manager at rivals Aston Villa. He left seven months later for his hometown club Solihull Moors in the National League, as assistant to Jimmy Shan.

Beale arrived at West Bromwich Albion in July 2021 to lead their under-23 team, before it was changed to under-21 across England in his second year. In October 2022, he was put in interim charge of the first team in the Championship after the sacking of Steve Bruce. He won on his debut away to Reading and lost his two other games before Carlos Corberán was appointed.

In June 2025, Beale departed West Bromwich Albion, and was rumoured to have agreed to become assistant manager to Noel Hunt at Reading in EFL League One. However, he changed this decision when offered the role of Head Coach of Aston Villa U18s, following the youth team's league and cup double the previous season and the promotion of former colleague Jimmy Shan to leader of the U21s. On 14 August, he was announced as Under-18s Lead Coach.

== Managerial statistics ==
As of match played 24 October 2022

Managerial record by team and tenure
Team	From	To	Record					Ref.
Team	From	To	P	W	D	L	Win %	Ref.
Birmingham City (joint-caretaker)	20 October 2014	27 October 2014	2	0	0	2	0.00	
West Bromwich Albion (caretaker)	10 October 2022	24 October 2022	3	1	0	2	33.33	
Total			5	1	0	4	20.00	
