= Jake Walker (English footballer) =

English footballer (born 2000)

Personal information
- Full name: Jake Thomas Walker
- Date of birth: 3 November 2000 (age 26)
- Place of birth: Bayston Hill, Shropshire, England
- Height: 5 ft 8 in (1.72 m)
- Positions: Right-back; midfielder

Youth career
- –2020: Aston Villa

Senior career*
| Years | Team | Apps | (Gls) |
| 2020–2021 | Aston Villa | 0 | (0) |
| 2020 | → Banbury United (loan) | 10 | (0) |
| 2020–2021 | → Alvechurch (loan) | 6 | (0) |
| 2021–2023 | Newtown | 74 | (4) |
- * Club domestic league appearances and goals as of 26 June 2023

Jake Thomas Walker (born 3 November 2000) is an English footballer who last played as a right-back and midfielder for Cymru Premier team Newtown. Walker is a product of the Aston Villa Academy and made one appearance for the senior side in the 2020-21 FA Cup, as well as appearing in the EFL Trophy for their U21 side. He has previously played on loan at Southern Football League sides Banbury United and Alvechurch.

== Career ==
=== Aston Villa ===
Walker joined the Aston Villa Academy at the age of nine and was given his first professional contract, a two-year deal, in 2019. Walker joined Banbury United on loan until the end of the season in January 2020. He joined Alvechurch on loan in October 2020, but was recalled in January 2021. Walker was named in the Aston Villa starting line-up for his senior debut on 8 January 2021 in an FA Cup third-round tie against Liverpool.

Walker was released by Aston Villa at the end of the 2020–21 season.

=== Newtown ===
On 7 August 2021, Walker signed a semi-professional contract with Newtown in the Cymru Premier. He made his debut on 15 August 2021, in a 4–1 defeat to The New Saints. During his first season, he moved from defence into midfield. He scored his first goal in senior football on 18 December 2021, in a 2–0 victory over Flint Town United.

== Career statistics ==
=== Club ===
As of match played 25 February 2023

Appearances and goals by club, season and competition
| Club | Season | League | | | National Cup | | League Cup | | Other | | Total | |
| Club | Season | Division | Apps | Goals | Apps | Goals | Apps | Goals | Apps | Goals | Apps | Goals |
|---|---|---|---|---|---|---|---|---|---|---|---|---|
| Aston Villa U21 | 2019–20 | — | | | — | | — | | 2 (Note: Appearance(s) in EFL Trophy) | 0 | 2 | 0 |
| Aston Villa U21 | 2020–21 | — | | | — | | — | | 1 | 0 | 1 | 0 |
| Aston Villa U21 | Total | | — | | — | | — | | 3 | 0 | 3 | 0 |
| Aston Villa | 2020–21 | Premier League | 0 | 0 | 1 | 0 | 0 | 0 | 0 | 0 | 1 | 0 |
| Banbury United (loan) | 2019–20 | Southern League Premier Division Central | 10 | 0 | 0 | 0 | — | | 1 (Note: Appearance in Oxfordshire Senior Cup) | 0 | 11 | 0 |
| Alvechurch (loan) | 2020–21 | Southern League Premier Division Central | 6 | 0 | 0 | 0 | — | | 1 (Note: Appearance in FA Trophy) | 0 | 7 | 0 |
| Newtown | 2021–22 | Cymru Premier | 29 | 1 | 2 | 0 | 1 | 0 | 0 | 0 | 32 | 1 |
| Newtown | 2022–23 | Cymru Premier | 24 | 2 | 1 | 0 | 0 | 0 | 4 (Note: Appearances in UEFA Europa Conference League) | 0 | 29 | 2 |
| Newtown | Total | | 53 | 3 | 1 | 0 | 1 | 0 | 4 | 0 | 61 | 3 |
| Career total | | | 69 | 3 | 4 | 0 | 0 | 0 | 9 | 0 | 83 | 3 |
