= Jimmy Shan =

English football manager (born 1978)

Personal information
- Date of birth: 28 October 1978 (age 48)
- Place of birth: Bordesley Green, England

Team information
- Current team: Aston Villa (U21 Head Coach)

Youth career
- Walsall

Senior career*
Years	Team	Apps	(Gls)
- Paget Rangers

Managerial career
- 2014–2018: West Bromwich Albion U23
- 2019: West Bromwich Albion (caretaker)
- 2019–2020: Kidderminster Harriers (interim)
- 2020–2021: Solihull Moors
- 2024–2025: Aston Villa U18
- 2025–: Aston Villa U21
- * Club domestic league appearances and goals

James Shan (born 28 October 1978) is an English football coach who is the Under-21 Head Coach at the Aston Villa Academy.

== Playing career ==
Shan spent a three-month period in the youth set-up at Walsall at the age of 15. Following his spell at Walsall, Shan dropped down into non-league as a youth player, attending trials at Torquay United and Sheffield Wednesday. Shan also played for local club Paget Rangers.

== Coaching career ==
Shan was a part of the coaching staff at his local club Birmingham City, coaching various age groups in the club's academy set-up.

In 2006, Shan joined the coaching staff of West Bromwich Albion, working with the club's under-7s age group. He later worked as manager of the under-18, under-21 and under-23 sides, before joining the first-team coaching staff at the end of the 2017–18 season. In March 2019 he was appointed caretaker manager following the sacking of Darren Moore, leading the club to a 3–0 victory against Swansea City in his first game in charge. In April 2019 it was announced that Shan would remain as caretaker manager until the end of the 2018–19 season.

On 28 June 2019, Shan left West Bromwich Albion following Slaven Bilić's appointment as head coach.

On 6 December 2019, Shan was appointed as the interim manager of Kidderminster Harriers in the National League North, leaving on 11 February 2020. The following day he was announced as new manager of Solihull Moors of the National League. He was linked with a move to Sheffield Wednesday following their appointment of Darren Moore, and a day later he was relieved of his duties with Solihull Moors.

He was appointed assistant manager of Rochdale in July 2021. He left the club in August 2022.

On 30 September 2022 it was announced by Darren Moore that Shan had joined Sheffield Wednesday as a member of their technical team. He left Sheffield Wednesday on 19 June 2023, with manager Darren Moore and the rest of his backroom staff.

On 21 September 2023, he re-united with Moore once again as part of the new coaching staff at Championship side Huddersfield Town.

In March 2024, Shan joined Swindon Town as assistant first-team coach.

On 12 July 2024, Shan joined Aston Villa Academy as the Under-18 Head Coach. On 5 May 2025, Shan guided Aston Villa U18s to their fifth overall FA Youth Cup title, with a 3–1 victory at Villa Park against Manchester City U18s. On 17 May, Aston Villa U18s won a second final against Manchester City to be crowned U18 National Champions of the Professional Development League.

On 12 June 2025, Shan was promoted to Head Coach of Aston Villa's Under-21 squad, replacing the outgoing Josep Gombau.

== Personal life ==
As of March 2019, Shan has three sons. Despite his mother and a number of family members being Birmingham City fans, Shan supported Liverpool growing up in Birmingham.

== Managerial statistics ==
As of match played 9 March 2021

Managerial record by team and tenure
Team	From	To	Record					Ref
Team	From	To	G	W	D	L	Win %	Ref
West Bromwich Albion (caretaker)	9 March 2019	28 June 2019	12	7	1	4	58.33	
Kidderminster Harriers (interim)	6 December 2019	11 February 2020	11	3	3	5	27.27	
Solihull Moors	12 February 2020	10 March 2021	32	12	6	14	37.50	
Career total			55	22	10	23	40.00	—

== Honours ==
Aston Villa U18

- Professional U18 Development League
  - National Champions: 2024–25
- FA Youth Cup
  - Winners: 2024–25
