= Ákos Onódi =

Hungarian footballer

Personal information
- Full name: Ákos Sándor Onódi
- Date of birth: 2 September 2001 (age 25)
- Place of birth: Győr, Hungary
- Height: 1.94 m (6 ft 4 in)
- Position: Goalkeeper

Team information
- Current team: Szeged
- Number: 51

Youth career
- 2007–2011: Mindszentpuszta SE
- 2011–2018: Győr

Senior career*
| Years | Team | Apps | (Gls) |
| 2018 | Győr | 3 | (0) |
| 2018–2022 | Aston Villa | 0 | (0) |
| 2021–2022 | → Bromsgrove Sporting (loan) | 14 | (0) |
| 2022–2023 | Akritas Chlorakas | 0 | (0) |
| 2024– | Szeged | 1 | (0) |

International career^{‡}
| 2017 | Hungary U16 | 1 | (0) |
| 2019 | Hungary U19 | 1 | (0) |
- * Club domestic league appearances and goals as of 12 August 2024 ‡ National team caps and goals as of 13:17, 8 January 2021 (UTC)

Ákos Sándor Onódi (born 2 September 2001) is a Hungarian footballer who plays as a goalkeeper for Hungarian club Szeged-Csanád Grosics Akadémia.

== Club career ==
=== Aston Villa ===
Onódi signed for Steve Bruce's Aston Villa before making his debut for on 8 January 2021 under Dean Smith in a FA Cup match against Liverpool.

On 6 July 2021, Onódi was amongst several Academy players who were given new professional contracts. On 16 July 2021, Onódi joined Southern League Premier Division side Bromsgrove Sporting on a season-long loan. He made his debut for Bromsgrove the following day, in a 1–0 pre-season friendly victory over Romulus. His first competitive appearance for the side was a 4–0 defeat to Leiston on the opening day of the Southern League Premier season.

On 24 May 2022, Onódi announced on his social media that we would be leaving Aston Villa at the end of his current contract on 1 July. This was confirmed by the Premier League on 10 June.

=== Akritas Chlorakas ===
On 25 August 2022, Onódi signed for Cypriot First Division club Akritas Chlorakas, revealing that he had turned down interest from clubs in England and Italy due to them wanting him to act as third-choice goalkeeper. Onódi was backup goalkeeper in his first season for Akritas, making no first-team appearances, but appearing on the bench 32 times.

On 1 July 2023, Onódi was released by the club, after their relegation to the second tier.

=== Szeged ===
In January 2024, Onódi signed for Hungarian second-tier club Szeged-Csanád Grosics Akadémia. On 4 August 2024, Onódi made his debut for the club, keeping a clean sheet in a 0–0 draw against Kozármisleny.

== Personal life ==
Despite news reports suggesting that Ákos is the nephew of Olympic gold medal-winning gymnast Henrietta Ónodi, he has confirmed that they are not in fact related.

== Career statistics ==
=== Club ===
As of match played 4 August 2024

Appearances and goals by club, season and competition
| Club | Season | League | | | FA Cup | | League Cup | | Other | | Total | |
| Club | Season | Division | Apps | Goals | Apps | Goals | Apps | Goals | Apps | Goals | Apps | Goals |
|---|---|---|---|---|---|---|---|---|---|---|---|---|
| Győr | 2017–18 | Nemzeti Bajnokság II | 3 | 0 | 0 | 0 | — | | 0 | 0 | 3 | 0 |
| Aston Villa | 2020–21 | Premier League | 0 | 0 | 1 | 0 | 0 | 0 | 2 (Note: Appearance(s) in EFL Trophy) | 0 | 3 | 0 |
| Aston Villa | 2021–22 | Premier League | 0 | 0 | 0 | 0 | 0 | 0 | 0 | 0 | 0 | 0 |
| Aston Villa | Total | | 0 | 0 | 1 | 0 | 0 | 0 | 2 | 0 | 3 | 0 |
| Bromsgrove Sporting (loan) | 2021–22 | Southern League Premier Division | 14 | 0 | 4 | 0 | — | | 2 (Note: One appearance in FA Trophy, one appearance in Southern League Challenge Cup) | 0 | 20 | 0 |
| Akritas Chlorakas | 2022–23 | Cypriot First Division | 0 | 0 | 0 | 0 | — | | 0 | 0 | 0 | 0 |
| Szeged | 2023–24 | Nemzeti Bajnokság II | 0 | 0 | 0 | 0 | — | | 0 | 0 | 0 | 0 |
| Szeged | 2024–25 | Nemzeti Bajnokság II | 1 | 0 | 0 | 0 | — | | 0 | 0 | 1 | 0 |
| Szeged | Total | | 1 | 0 | 0 | 0 | 0 | 0 | 0 | 0 | 1 | 0 |
| Career total | | | 18 | 0 | 5 | 0 | 0 | 0 | 4 | 0 | 27 | 0 |
