= 2020–21 Aston Villa F.C. season =

English football club season

Aston Villa
2020–21 season
- Owners: Nassef Sawiris; Wes Edens
- Chairman: Nassef Sawiris
- Head coach: Dean Smith
- Stadium: Villa Park
- Premier League: 11th
- FA Cup: Third round
- EFL Cup: Fourth round
- Top goalscorer: League: Ollie Watkins (14); All: Ollie Watkins (16)
- Biggest win: 7–2 (vs. Liverpool, 4 October 2020)
- Biggest defeat: 0–3 (vs. Leeds United, 23 October 2020)
Home colours	Away colours	Third colours

The 2020-21 season was Aston Villa's 26th season in the Premier League. The 2020–21 Premier League season was Villa's 146th season in English football. It was the club's 107th season at the top flight. In addition to the domestic league, Aston Villa participated in the EFL Cup, being eliminated by Stoke City in the fourth round, and participated in the FA Cup, being eliminated by Liverpool in the third round.

The entire season took place against the backdrop of the global COVID-19 pandemic, which necessitated the players' compliance with strict restrictions on contact as well as a lack of fans at all Villa's home matches until the final day of the campaign.

Villa started the season with four successive league wins, matching a record which had stood since the 1930-31 season. Other notable statistics included inflicting a 7-2 victory over defending champions Liverpool, the most goals conceded in a single game by a defending champion since 1953.

== Pre-season ==
Win Draw Loss Fixtures

On 25 August 2020, it was revealed that Aston Villa's first pre-season friendly would be against Bristol City. However, the location, kick off time and score would not be publicised until the match was finished.

August

26 August 2020	Aston Villa	0–1	Bristol City	Vale of Glamorgan, Wales
12:00 BST		Report	Paterson	Stadium: The Vale Resort; Attendance: 0

26 August 2020	Aston Villa	1–0	Bristol City	Vale of Glamorgan, Wales
14:00 BST	Samatta	Report		Stadium: The Vale Resort; Attendance: 0

29 August 2020	Aston Villa	5–2	Wycombe Wanderers	Bodymoor Heath, Warwickshire
15:00 BST	El Ghazi; Konsa; Trézéguet; Samatta	Report	Onyedinma; Kashket	Stadium: Bodymoor Heath Training Ground; Attendance: 0

September

5 September 2020	Arsenal	2–3	Aston Villa	Highbury, London
15:00 BST	Aubameyang	Report	Ramsey; Douglas Luiz	Stadium: Emirates Stadium; Attendance: 0

12 September 2020	Aston Villa	1–0	Manchester United	Aston, Birmingham
14:00 BST	Watkins 15'	Report		Stadium: Villa Park; Attendance: 0 Referee: Lee Mason

October

28 October 2020	Aston Villa	3–1	West Bromwich Albion	Bodymoor Heath, Warwickshire
14:00 BST	Taylor; Traore; Davis	Report	Austin	Stadium: Bodymoor Heath Training Ground; Attendance: 0

== Competitions ==
=== Overview ===
Competition	First match	Last match	Starting round	Final position	Record							
Competition	First match	Last match	Starting round	Final position	Pld	W	D	L	GF	GA	GD	Win %
Premier League	21 September 2020	23 May 2021	Matchday 1	11th	38	16	7	15	55	46	+9	42.11
FA Cup	8 January 2021		Third round	Third round	1	0	0	1	1	4	−3	0.00
EFL Cup	15 September 2020	1 October 2020	Second round	Fourth round	3	2	0	1	6	2	+4	66.67
Total					42	18	7	17	62	52	+10	42.86

Source: Soccerway

=== Premier League ===
Pos	Team	Pld	W	D	L	GF	GA	GD	Pts
9	Leeds United	38	18	5	15	62	54	+8	59
10	Everton	38	17	8	13	47	48	−1	59
11	Aston Villa	38	16	7	15	55	46	+9	55
12	Newcastle United	38	12	9	17	46	62	−16	45
13	Wolverhampton Wanderers	38	12	9	17	36	52	−16	45

Source: Premier League
Rules for classification: 1) Points; 2) Goal difference; 3) Goals scored; 4) If the champions, relegated teams or qualified teams for UEFA competitions cannot be determined by rules 1 to 3, rules 4.1 to 4.3 are applied – 4.1) Points gained in head-to-head record between such teams; 4.2) Away goals scored in head-to-head record between such teams; 4.3) Play-offs

Overall								Home						Away					
Pld	W	D	L	GF	GA	GD	Pts	W	D	L	GF	GA	GD	W	D	L	GF	GA	GD
38	16	7	15	55	46	+9	55	7	4	8	29	27	+2	9	3	7	26	19	+7

Source: Premier League

Matchday	1	2	3	4	5	6	7	8	9	10	11	12	13	14	15	16	17	18	19	20	21	22	23	24	25	26	27	28	29	30	31	32	33	34	35	36	37	38
Ground	H	A	H	A	H	H	A	H	A	A	H	A	H	A	A	A	H	A	A	H	H	A	H	A	A	H	A	H	H	A	H	H	A	H	H	A	A	H
Result	W	W	W	W	L	L	W	L	L	W	D	W	W	D	L	L	W	L	W	L	W	D	L	W	L	D	D	L	W	L	L	D	W	L	D	L	W	W
Position	9	4	2	2	3	8	6	7	10	10	11	9	7	5	8	11	8	10	9	9	9	8	8	9	9	9	10	10	9	11	11	11	10	11	11	11	11	11

Source: Sky Sports
A = Away; H = Home; W = Win; D = Draw; L = Loss

==== Matches ====
The 2020–21 season fixtures were released on 20 August 2020. The 2020–21 season officially began on 12 September 2020. However, clubs who had participated in the latter rearranged knockout rounds of the previous season's Champions League and Europa League competitions in August 2020 were allowed a further week to rest and prepare their squads for the new season. Villa's match away to Manchester City, originally scheduled for gameweek 1, was therefore postponed until later in the season, and Villa instead started their campaign on the following Monday night at home to Sheffield United. The Man City away fixture was eventually rearranged for 20 January 2021.

On 1 December 2020, Villa's game at home to Newcastle United scheduled for 4 December 2020 was postponed following a Premier League Board meeting. Newcastle lodged a request with the Premier League to rearrange the fixture following an increase in positive SARS-CoV-2 test results received by the club the previous day, on top of four positive cases reported on 27 November 2020 for one non-playing staff and three first team players. The Board agreed to rearrange the game as a safety precaution. The match was subsequently rescheduled for 23 January 2021.

September

21 September 2020 1	Aston Villa	1–0	Sheffield United	Aston, Birmingham
18:00 BST	Targett (yellow card) 33'; Konsa 63'; Cash (yellow card) 83'; McGinn (yellow card) 84'	Report	Lundstram (yellow card) 10'; Egan (red card) 12'	Stadium: Villa Park; Attendance: 0 Referee: Graham Scott
Note: Live on Sky Sports

28 September 2020 2	Fulham	0–3	Aston Villa	Fulham, London
17:45 BST	Reid (yellow card) 11'; Cairney (yellow card) 23'; Bryan (yellow card) 45+3'; Odoi (yellow card) 47'; Le Marchand (yellow card) 68'; Kamara (yellow card) 90+1'	Report	Grealish 4'; Targett (yellow card) 11'; Hourihane 15'; Mings 48', (yellow card) 90+1'; McGinn (yellow card) 59'	Stadium: Craven Cottage; Attendance: 0 Referee: Stuart Attwell
Note: Live on Sky Sports

October

4 October 2020 3	Aston Villa	7–2	Liverpool	Aston, Birmingham
19:15 BST	Watkins 4', 22', 39'; McGinn 35'; Douglas Luiz (yellow card) 46'; Barkley 55'; Grealish 66', 75'; Nakamba (yellow card) 90+2'	Report	Salah 33', 60'; Van Dijk (yellow card) 38'	Stadium: Villa Park; Attendance: 0 Referee: Martin Atkinson
Note: Live on Sky Sports

18 October 2020 4	Leicester City	0–1	Aston Villa	Leicester
19:15 BST	Pérez (yellow card) 31'; Tielemans (yellow card) 41'; Castagne (yellow card) 73'; Evans (yellow card) 74'	Report	McGinn (yellow card) 32'; Cash (yellow card) 40'; Douglas Luiz (yellow card) 70'; Barkley 90+1'	Stadium: King Power Stadium; Attendance: 0 Referee: Jonathan Moss
Note: Live on Sky Sports Box Office

23 October 2020 5	Aston Villa	0–3	Leeds United	Aston, Birmingham
21:00 BST	Mings (yellow card) 53'; Grealish (yellow card) 69'	Report	Struijk (yellow card) 10'; Bamford 55', 67', 74'; Klich (yellow card) 90+1'	Stadium: Villa Park; Attendance: 0 Referee: Paul Tierney
Note: Live on BT Sport Box Office

November

1 November 2020 6	Aston Villa	3–4	Southampton	Aston, Birmingham
12:00 GMT	Cash (yellow card) 43'; Mings 62'; Watkins 90+3' (pen.); Grealish 90+7'	Report	Ward-Prowse (yellow card) 12', (goal) 33', 45'; Vestergaard 20'; Ings 58'; Diallo (yellow card) 90+2'	Stadium: Villa Park; Attendance: 0 Referee: Darren England
Note: Live on Sky Sports Box Office

8 November 2020 7	Arsenal	0–3	Aston Villa	Holloway, London
19:15 GMT		Report	Saka 25' (o.g.); Watkins 72', 75'	Stadium: Emirates Stadium; Attendance: 0 Referee: Martin Atkinson
Note: Live on Sky Sports Box Office

21 November 2020 8	Aston Villa	1–2	Brighton & Hove Albion	Aston, Birmingham
15:00 GMT	Targett (yellow card) 44'; Konsa 47'; Grealish (yellow card) 90+1'	Report	Welbeck 12'; March 56'; Bissouma (yellow card) 69'; Lamptey (yellow card) 88' (yellow-red card) 90+1'	Stadium: Villa Park; Attendance: 0 Referee: Michael Oliver
Note: Live on BT Sport

30 November 2020 9	West Ham United	2–1	Aston Villa	Stratford, London
20:00 GMT	Ogbonna 2'; Bowen 46'; Fornals (yellow card) 53'	Report	Grealish 25'; Cash (yellow card) 67'	Stadium: London Stadium; Attendance: 0 Referee: Peter Bankes
Note: Live on Sky Sports

December

12 December 2020 10	Wolverhampton Wanderers	0–1	Aston Villa	Wolverhampton
12:30 GMT	Traoré (yellow card) 43'; Dendoncker (yellow card) 77'; Moutinho (yellow card) 83' (yellow-red card) 90+5'	Report	Douglas Luiz (yellow card) 14' (yellow-red card) 85'; Cash (yellow card) 29'; McGinn (yellow card) 30'; Targett (yellow card) 81'; Konsa (yellow card) 81'; Grealish (yellow card) 88'; El Ghazi 90+4' (pen.)	Stadium: Molineux Stadium; Attendance: 0 Referee: Mike Dean
Note: Live on BT Sport

17 December 2020 11	Aston Villa	0–0	Burnley	Aston, Birmingham
18:00 GMT	Watkins (yellow card) 85'	Report	Brady (yellow card) 32'	Stadium: Villa Park; Attendance: 0 Referee: Craig Pawson
Note: Live on Amazon Prime

20 December 2020 12	West Bromwich Albion	0–3	Aston Villa	West Bromwich
19:15 GMT	Livermore (red card) 36'; Grant (yellow card) 62'	Report	El Ghazi 5', 88' (pen.); Hause (yellow card) 40'; Mings (yellow card) 66'; Traoré 84'	Stadium: The Hawthorns; Attendance: 0 Referee: Martin Atkinson
Note: Live on BT Sport

26 December 2020 13	Aston Villa	3–0	Crystal Palace	Aston, Birmingham
15:00 GMT	Traoré 5'; Mings (yellow card) 39' (yellow-red card) 45'; Hause 66'; El Ghazi 76'	Report	Zaha (yellow card) 39'; Milivojević (yellow card) 56'; Ward (yellow card) 68'; Eze (yellow card) 83'	Stadium: Villa Park; Attendance: 0 Referee: Anthony Taylor
Note: Live on BBC Sport

28 December 2020 14	Chelsea	1–1	Aston Villa	Fulham, London
17:30 GMT	Giroud 34', (yellow card) 71'; Azpilicueta (yellow card) 45+2'; Kanté (yellow card) 74'	Report	El Ghazi 50', (yellow card) 71'	Stadium: Stamford Bridge; Attendance: 0 Referee: Stuart Attwell
Note: Live on Amazon Prime

January

1 January 2021 15	Manchester United	2–1	Aston Villa	Greater Manchester
20:00 GMT	Martial 40'; Maguire (yellow card) 49'; Bailly (yellow card) 56'; Fernandes 61' (pen.); Shaw (yellow card) 89'; Matić (yellow card) 90'	Report	Traoré 58'	Stadium: Old Trafford; Attendance: 0 Referee: Michael Oliver

20 January 2021 16	Manchester City	2–0	Aston Villa	Manchester
18:00 GMT	Silva 79'; Gündoğan 90' (pen.)	Report	McGinn (yellow card) 67'; Taylor (yellow card) 86'	Stadium: Etihad Stadium; Attendance: 0 Referee: Jonathan Moss
Note: Originally scheduled for 12 September 2020. Postponed due to Manchester City's participation in European fixtures overrunning the previous season. Live on BT Sport

23 January 2021 17	Aston Villa	2–0	Newcastle United	Aston, Birmingham
20:00 GMT	Watkins 13'; Traoré 42'	Report	Schär (yellow card) 26'; Carroll (yellow card) 54'; Lascelles (yellow card) 57'	Stadium: Villa Park; Attendance: 0 Referee: Simon Hooper
Note: Originally scheduled for 4 December 2020, postponed due to safety concerns following a COVID-19 outbreak at the Newcastle United training ground. Live on Sky Sports.

27 January 2021 18	Burnley	3–2	Aston Villa	Burnley
18:00 GMT	Tarkowski (yellow card) 22'; Mee 52'; McNeil 76'; Wood 79'	Report	Watkins 14'; Grealish 68'	Stadium: Turf Moor; Attendance: 0 Referee: Paul Tierney
Note: Live on BT Sport

30 January 2021 19	Southampton	0–1	Aston Villa	Southampton
20:00 GMT	Ward-Prowse (yellow card) 53'	Report	Barkley 41'	Stadium: St Mary's Stadium; Attendance: 0 Referee: Lee Mason
Note: Live on Sky Sports

February

3 February 2021 20	Aston Villa	1–3	West Ham United	Aston, Birmingham
20:15 GMT	Douglas Luiz (yellow card) 70'; Watkins 81'	Report	Souček 51'; Lingard 56', 83'; Cresswell (yellow card) 65'	Stadium: Villa Park; Attendance: 0 Referee: Andrew Madley
Note: Live on BT Sport

6 February 2021 21	Aston Villa	1–0	Arsenal	Aston, Birmingham
12:30 GMT	Watkins 2'; Konsa (yellow card) 31'; Nakamba (yellow card) 35'; Grealish (yellow card) 90+6'	Report	Thomas (yellow card) 52'; Xhaka (yellow card) 90+4'	Stadium: Villa Park; Attendance: 0 Referee: Chris Kavanagh
Note: Live on BT Sport

13 February 2021 22	Brighton & Hove Albion	0–0	Aston Villa	Falmer
20:00 GMT	Alzate (yellow card) 20'; Trossard (yellow card) 77'	Report	Grealish (yellow card) 21'; Douglas Luiz (yellow card) 70'; Sanson (yellow card) 89'	Stadium: American Express Community Stadium; Attendance: 0 Referee: Darren England
Note: Live on Sky Sports

21 February 2021 23	Aston Villa	1–2	Leicester City	Aston, Birmingham
14:05 GMT	Traoré 48'; Luiz (yellow card) 51'; Elmohamady (yellow card) 59'	Report	Maddison 19'; Barnes 23'; Ndidi (yellow card) 34'	Stadium: Villa Park; Attendance: 0 Referee: Michael Oliver
Note: Live on Sky Sports

27 February 2021 24	Leeds United	0–1	Aston Villa	Leeds
17:30 GMT	Roberts (yellow card) 61'; Klich (yellow card) 63'; Hernández (yellow card) 84'	Report	El Ghazi 5'; Targett (yellow card) 61'; Elmohamady (yellow card) 80'	Stadium: Elland Road; Attendance: 0 Referee: Peter Bankes
Note: Live on Sky Sports

March

3 March 2021 25	Sheffield United	1–0	Aston Villa	Sheffield
18:00 GMT	McGoldrick 30', (yellow card) 45+1'; Jagielka (red card) 57'	Report		Stadium: Bramall Lane; Attendance: 0 Referee: Robert Jones
Note: Live on BT Sport

6 March 2021 26	Aston Villa	0–0	Wolverhampton Wanderers	Aston, Birmingham
17:30 GMT	Sanson (yellow card) 27'	Report		Stadium: Villa Park; Attendance: 0 Referee: Andrew Madley
Note: Live on Sky Sports

12 March 2021 27	Newcastle United	1–1	Aston Villa	Newcastle upon Tyne
20:00 GMT	Krafth (yellow card) 52'; Lascelles (yellow card) 68', (goal) 90+4'	Report	McGinn (yellow card) 74'; Sanson (yellow card) 77'; Mings (yellow card) 79'; Clark 86' (o.g.)	Stadium: St James' Park; Attendance: 0 Referee: Paul Tierney
Note: Live on BT Sport

21 March 2021 28	Aston Villa	0–2	Tottenham Hotspur	Aston, Birmingham
19:30 GMT	Cash (yellow card) 74'; McGinn (yellow card) 86'; Targett (yellow card) 90+3'	Report	Carlos Vinícius 29', (yellow card) 83'; Lo Celso (yellow card) 63'; Kane 68' (pen.)	Stadium: Villa Park; Attendance: 0 Referee: Mike Dean
Note: Originally scheduled for 13 January 2021, postponed due to a COVID-19 outbreak at Aston Villa's training ground. Live on Sky Sports

April

4 April 2021 29	Aston Villa	3–1	Fulham	Aston, Birmingham
16:30 BST	Douglas Luiz (yellow card) 15'; Trézéguet 78', 81'; Watkins 87'	Report	Andersen (yellow card) 16'; Mitrović 61'; Reid (yellow card) 74'	Stadium: Villa Park; Attendance: 0 Referee: Andrew Madley
Note: Live on Sky Sports

10 April 2021 30	Liverpool	2–1	Aston Villa	Liverpool
15:00 BST	Salah 57'; Milner (yellow card) 65'; Robertson (yellow card) 74'; Alexander-Arnold 90+1'	Report	Konsa (yellow card) 25'; Watkins 43', (yellow card) 85'; Douglas Luiz (yellow card) 49'; Targett (yellow card) 73'	Stadium: Anfield; Attendance: 0 Referee: Paul Tierney
Note: Live on Sky Sports

21 April 2021 31	Aston Villa	1–2	Manchester City	Aston, Birmingham
20:15 BST	McGinn 1'; Cash (yellow card) 54' (yellow-red card) 57'	Report	Foden 22'; Rodri 40'; Stones (red card) 44'; Gündoğan (yellow card) 44'	Stadium: Villa Park; Attendance: 0 Referee: Peter Bankes
Note: Originally scheduled for 17 April 2021, postponed due to Manchester City's involvement in the FA Cup Semi-finals. Live on Sky Sports

25 April 2021 32	Aston Villa	2–2	West Bromwich Albion	Aston, Birmingham
19:00 BST	El Ghazi 9' (pen.); Davis 90+2'	Report	Pereira 23' (pen.); Mings 47' (o.g.); Gallagher (yellow card) 54'; Yokuşlu (yellow card) 77'	Stadium: Villa Park; Attendance: 0 Referee: Stuart Attwell
Note: Live on BT Sport

May

1 May 2021 33	Everton	1–2	Aston Villa	Liverpool
20:00 BST	Calvert-Lewin 19'	Report	Watkins 13'; Douglas Luiz (yellow card) 41'; El Ghazi 80', (yellow card) 90'	Stadium: Goodison Park; Attendance: 0 Referee: Simon Hooper
Note: Live on BT Sport

9 May 2021 34	Aston Villa	1–3	Manchester United	Aston, Birmingham
14:05 BST	Traoré 24'; Watkins (yellow card) 45+1' (yellow-red card) 89'; McGinn (yellow card) 79'	Report	Fernandes 52' (pen.); Greenwood 56'; Maguire (yellow card) 67'; Cavani 87'	Stadium: Villa Park; Attendance: 0 Referee: Chris Kavanagh
Note: Live on Sky Sports

13 May 2021 35	Aston Villa	0–0	Everton	Aston, Birmingham
18:00 BST	Traoré (yellow card) 43'; McGinn (yellow card) 90'	Report	Sigurðsson (yellow card) 55'	Stadium: Villa Park; Attendance: 0 Referee: Martin Atkinson
Note: Originally scheduled for 16 January 2021, moved forward one day due to Aston Villa first team players isolating after a COVID-19 outbreak at their training ground. And then postponed as the training ground could not be opened in time. Live on Sky Sports

16 May 2021 36	Crystal Palace	3–2	Aston Villa	Selhurst, London
12:00 BST	Benteke 32'; Ward (yellow card) 73'; Zaha 75', (yellow card) 90+2'; Kouyaté (yellow card) 82'; Mitchell 84'	Report	McGinn 17', (yellow card) 50'; El Ghazi 34'; Hause (yellow card) 86'	Stadium: Selhurst Park; Attendance: 0 Referee: David Coote
Note: Fixture date was moved to help reschedule the Aston Villa vs. Everton game that was postponed due to COVID-19. Live on Sky Sports

19 May 2021 37	Tottenham Hotspur	1–2	Aston Villa	Tottenham, London
18:00 BST	Bergwijn 8'; Højbjerg (yellow card) 43'	Report	Reguilón 20' (o.g.); Watkins 39'; McGinn (yellow card) 90+1'	Stadium: Tottenham Hotspur Stadium; Attendance: 10,000; Referee: Craig Pawson
Note: Live on Sky Sports

23 May 2021 38	Aston Villa	2–1	Chelsea	Aston, Birmingham
16:00 BST	Traoré 43'; El Ghazi 52' (pen.); McGinn (yellow card) 65'; Nakamba (yellow card) 74'; Martínez (yellow card) 81'	Report	Jorginho (yellow card) 45'; Werner (yellow card) 45+2'; Kovačić (yellow card) 49'; Chilwell 70'; Azpilicueta (red card) 89'; Arrizabalaga (yellow card) 90+5'	Stadium: Villa Park; Attendance: 10,000; Referee: Stuart Attwell

=== FA Cup ===
Aston Villa joined the FA Cup along with all other Premier League teams in the third round. The third round draw was made on 30 November 2020, by Robbie Savage on the BT Sport YouTube channel. In the week building up to their third round tie against Liverpool, there was a "significant" COVID-19 outbreak at Villa's Bodymoor Heath Training Ground. Because of this, the entire Aston Villa first team was forced to self-isolate, as well as Dean Smith and his backroom staff. On the morning of 8 January 2021, Aston Villa confirmed that they would be forced to field a team made up of players from the Under-18s and Under-23s squads, managed by Mark Delaney.

8 January 2021 Third round	Aston Villa	1–4	Liverpool	Aston, Birmingham
19:45 GMT	Barry 41'	Report	Mané 4', 63'; Jones (yellow card) 44'; Wijnaldum 60'; Salah 65'	Stadium: Villa Park; Attendance: 0 Referee: Craig Pawson
Note: Live on BT Sport

=== EFL Cup ===
Aston Villa joined the EFL Cup in the second round. The second and third round draws were made on 6 September 2020, by Phil Babb on Sky Sports. The fourth round draw was made on 17 September 2020, also on Sky Sports.

15 September 2020 Second round	Burton Albion	1–3	Aston Villa	Burton upon Trent
19:45 BST	Daniel 2'; Akins (yellow card) 62'; Quinn (yellow card) 89'	Report	Watkins 39'; Ramsey (yellow card) 69'; Grealish 88'; Davis 90+2'	Stadium: Pirelli Stadium; Attendance: 0 Referee: Oliver Langford
Note: Live on Sky Sports

24 September 2020 Third round	Bristol City	0–3	Aston Villa	Bristol
19:00 BST		Report	El Ghazi 11'; Traoré 14'; Watkins 73'	Stadium: Ashton Gate; Attendance: 0 Referee: James Linington

1 October 2020 Fourth round	Aston Villa	0–1	Stoke City	Aston, Birmingham
19:00 BST	Davis (yellow card) 59'; Ramsey (yellow card) 65'	Report	Vokes 26'	Stadium: Villa Park; Attendance: 0 Referee: Robert Jones

== Squad ==
N	Pos.	Nat.	Name	Age	Since	App	Goals	Ends	Transfer fee	Previous Club	Notes
1	GK	(England)	Tom Heaton	35	2019	20	0	2023	£8M	(England) Burnley	
2	DF	(England)	Matty Cash	23	2020	28	0	2025	£14M	(England) Nottingham Forest	
3	DF	(Wales)	Neil Taylor	32	2017 (Winter)	103	0	2021	Undisclosed	(Wales) Swansea City	
4	DF	(England)	Ezri Konsa	23	2019	67	4	2026	£12M	(England) Brentford	
5	DF	(England)	Tyrone Mings	28	2019	91	6	2024	£20M	(England) Bournemouth	
6	MF	(Brazil)	Douglas Luiz	23	2019	74	3	2023	£15M	(England) Manchester City	
7	MF	(Scotland)	John McGinn	26	2018	111	13	2025	£3.5M	(Scotland) Hibernian	
9	FW	(Brazil)	Wesley	24	2019	25	6	2024	£22M	(Belgium) Club Brugge	
10	MF	(England)	Jack Grealish	25	2001	212	33	2025	Academy	Academy	Captain
11	FW	(England)	Ollie Watkins	25	2020	40	16	2025	£28M	(England) Brentford	Current record signing
12	GK	(England)	Jed Steer	28	2013	33	0	2023	£0.4M	(England) Norwich City	
14	MF	(Republic of Ireland)	Conor Hourihane	30	2017 (Winter)	150	29	2022	£3.2M	(England) Barnsley	On loan at Swansea City
15	FW	(Burkina Faso)	Bertrand Traoré	25	2020	37	8	2024	£17M	(France) Olympique Lyonnais	
17	MF	(Egypt)	Trézéguet	26	2019	63	9	2023	£8.8M	(Turkey) Kasımpaşa	
18	DF	(England)	Matt Targett	25	2019	70	2	2023	£11.5M	(England) Southampton	
19	MF	(Zimbabwe)	Marvelous Nakamba	27	2019	50	0	2024	£10.2M	(Belgium) Club Brugge	
20	MF	(England)	Ross Barkley	27	2020	24	3	2021	Season Long Loan	(England) Chelsea	
21	MF	(Netherlands)	Anwar El Ghazi	26	2019	107	22	2023	£8.1M	(France) Lille	
22	DF	(Belgium)	Björn Engels	26	2019	19	1	2024	£9M	(France) Reims	
24	DF	(France)	Frédéric Guilbert	26	2019 (Winter)	31	2	2023	£4.5M	(France) Caen	On loan at Strasbourg
25	MF	(France)	Morgan Sanson	26	2021 (Winter)	9	0	2025	£14M	(France) Marseille	
26	GK	(Argentina)	Emiliano Martínez	28	2020	38	0	2024	£17M	(England) Arsenal	
27	DF	(Egypt)	Ahmed Elmohamady	33	2017	131	4	2021	£1M	(England) Hull City	
28	GK	(Croatia)	Lovre Kalinić	31	2019 (Winter)	8	0	2023	£5.4M	(Belgium) Gent	On loan at Hajduk Split
30	DF	(England)	Kortney Hause	25	2019	45	3	2022	£3M	(England) Wolverhampton Wanderers	
36	FW	(United States)	Indiana Vassilev	20	2018	8	1	2022	Academy	Academy	On loan at Cheltenham Town
37	DF	(England)	Mungo Bridge	20	2019	3	0	?	Academy	Academy	
39	FW	(England)	Keinan Davis	23	2015	85	6	2024	Academy	Academy	
41	MF	(England)	Jacob Ramsey	20	2007	29	0	2025	Academy	Academy	
42	DF	(England)	Dominic Revan	20	2016	6	0	?	Academy	Academy	
46	DF	(England)	Jake Walker	20	2016	4	0	?	Academy	Academy	
47	DF	(England)	Callum Rowe	21	2016	4	0	?	Academy	Academy	On loan at Hereford
50	DF	(England)	Harrison Sohna	18	2017	3	1	?	Academy	Academy	
51	GK	(Hungary)	Ákos Onódi	19	2018	3	0	?	Academy	Academy	
52	MF	(England)	Jaden Philogene	19	2019	3	0	?	Academy	Academy	
56	FW	(England)	Cameron Archer	19	2007	4	1	2023	Academy	Academy	On loan at Solihull Moors
57	MF	(England)	Ben Chrisene	17	2020	2	0	2023	£0.4M	(England) Exeter City	
60	MF	(England)	Carney Chukwuemeka	17	2019	4	0	?	Free	(England) Northampton Town	
61	FW	(England)	Louie Barry	18	2019 (Winter)	2	1	2026	£0.8M	(Spain) Barcelona	
62	MF	(England)	Kaine Kesler	18	2018	1	0	?	Academy	Academy	
67	MF	(England)	Arjan Raikhy	18	2019	2	0	?	Academy	Academy	
68	MF	(England)	Brad Young	18	2018	3	0	?	Academy	Academy	
69	MF	(Spain)	Mamadou Sylla	18	2018	1	0	?	Academy	Academy	
70	MF	(Netherlands)	Lamare Bogarde	17	2020	1	0	2023	Free	(Netherlands) Feyenoord	
71	MF	(England)	Hayden Lindley	18	2019	2	0	?	Academy	Academy	
72	MF	(Netherlands)	Sil Swinkels	17	2020	1	0	?	Free	(Netherlands) Vitesse Arnhem	
73	MF	(England)	Edward Rowe	18	2019	1	0	?	Academy	Academy	
74	GK	(Finland)	Viljami Sinisalo	19	2018	1	0	?	Free	(Finland) Espoo	

=== Transfers ===
Transfers in

Date from	Position	Nationality	Name	From	Fee	Ref.
21 July 2020	CB	(Republic of Ireland)	Aaron O'Reilly	(Republic of Ireland) St Patrick's Athletic	Undisclosed	
3 August 2020	CB	(Netherlands)	Sil Swinkels	(Netherlands) Vitesse	Free Transfer	
16 August 2020	GK	(Poland)	Oliwier Zych	(Poland) Zagłębie Lubin	Undisclosed	
19 August 2020	CM	(England)	Ben Chrisene	(England) Exeter City	£440,000	
1 September 2020	CF	(England)	Ruben Shakpoke	(England) Norwich City	Undisclosed	
3 September 2020	RB	(England)	Matty Cash	(England) Nottingham Forest	£14,000,000	
9 September 2020	CF	(England)	Ollie Watkins	(England) Brentford	£28,000,000	
11 September 2020	CM	(Netherlands)	Lamare Bogarde	(Netherlands) Feyenoord	Undisclosed	
15 September 2020	GK	(Argentina)	Emiliano Martínez	(England) Arsenal	£17,000,000	
19 September 2020	FW	(Burkina Faso)	Bertrand Traoré	(France) Lyon	£17,000,000	
26 January 2021	CM	(France)	Morgan Sanson	(France) Marseille	£14,000,000	

Transfers out

Date from	Position	Nationality	Name	To	Fee	Ref.
1 July 2020	CF	(Spain)	Borja Bastón	(Spain) Leganés	Released	
1 July 2020	RB	(England)	Isaiah Bazeley-Graham	(England) Barwell	Released	
1 July 2020	DM	(England)	Jack Birch	(England) Alvechurch	Released	
1 July 2020	CB	(Wales)	James Chester	(England) Stoke City	Released	
1 July 2020	CM	(Republic of Ireland)	Jake Doyle-Hayes	(Scotland) St Mirren	Released	
1 July 2020	FW	(England)	Andre Green	(England) Sheffield Wednesday	Released	
1 July 2020	CF	(England)	Rushian Hepburn-Murphy	(Cyprus) Pafos	Released	
1 July 2020	FW	(England)	Anton Hooper	Free agent	Released	
1 July 2020	LW	(Netherlands)	Colin Odutayo	Free agent	Released	
1 July 2020	AM	(England)	Callum O'Hare	(England) Coventry City	Released	
1 July 2020	GK	(Montenegro)	Matija Sarkic	(England) Wolverhampton Wanderers	Released	
1 July 2020	CF	(France)	Dimitri Sea	(England) Barrow	Released	
1 July 2020	GK	(New Zealand)	Jamie Searle	(Wales) Swansea City	Released	
1 September 2020	RB	(England)	James Bree	(England) Luton Town	Undisclosed	
16 September 2020	CF	(Republic of Ireland)	Scott Hogan	(England) Birmingham City	Undisclosed	
3 October 2020	AM	(Spain)	Jota	(Spain) Alavés	Free Transfer	
5 October 2020	GK	(Norway)	Ørjan Nyland	(England) Norwich City	Released	
29 January 2021	CM	(England)	Henri Lansbury	(England) Bristol City	Released	

Loans in

Date from	Position	Nationality	Name	From	Until	Ref.
30 September 2020	CM	(England)	Ross Barkley	(England) Chelsea	End of season	

Loans out

Date from	Position	Nationality	Name	To	Until	Ref.
24 August 2020	CM	(Republic of Ireland)	Jack Clarke	(England) Yeovil Town	5 January 2021	
17 September 2020	FW	(United States)	Indiana Vassilev	(England) Burton Albion	29 January 2021	
25 September 2020	CF	(Tanzania)	Mbwana Samatta	(Turkey) Fenerbahçe	End of season	
25 September 2020	GK	(Finland)	Viljami Sinisalo	(Scotland) Ayr United	8 April 2021	
2 October 2020	CF	(England)	Cameron Archer	(England) Solihull Moors	End of season	
7 October 2020	AM	(England)	Ben Guy	(Northern Ireland) Portadown	End of season	
16 October 2020	RB	(England)	Jake Walker	(England) Alvechurch	8 January 2021	
20 October 2020	CM	(England)	Lewis Brunt	(England) Gloucester City	3 January 2021	
5 January 2021	CM	(Republic of Ireland)	Jack Clarke	(England) Chesterfield	End of season	
13 January 2021	RW	(Republic of Ireland)	Tyreik Wright	(England) Walsall	End of season	
15 January 2021	CB	(England)	Dominic Revan	(England) Weymouth	26 April 2021	
16 January 2021	LB	(England)	Callum Rowe	(England) Hereford	End of season	
18 January 2021	GK	(Croatia)	Lovre Kalinić	(Croatia) Hajduk Split	End of season	
19 January 2021	CM	(Republic of Ireland)	Conor Hourihane	(Wales) Swansea City	End of season	
29 January 2021	LW	(United States)	Indiana Vassilev	(England) Cheltenham Town	End of season	
31 January 2021	RB	(France)	Frédéric Guilbert	(France) Strasbourg	End of season	

=== Appearances and goals ===
No.	Pos	Nat	Player	Total		Premier League		FA Cup		League Cup		Other	
No.	Pos	Nat	Player	Apps	Goals	Apps	Goals	Apps	Goals	Apps	Goals	Apps	Goals
Goalkeepers
1	GK	(England) ENG	Tom Heaton	0	0	0	0	0	0	0	0	0	0
12	GK	(England) ENG	Jed Steer	2	0	0	0	0	0	2	0	0	0
26	GK	(Argentina) ARG	Emiliano Martínez	38	0	38	0	0	0	0	0	0	0
51	GK	(Hungary) HUN	Ákos Onódi	1	0	0	0	1	0	0	0	0	0
Defenders
2	DF	(England) ENG	Matty Cash	28	0	28	0	0	0	0	0	0	0
3	DF	(Wales) WAL	Neil Taylor	4	0	0+1	0	0	0	3	0	0	0
4	DF	(England) ENG	Ezri Konsa	37	2	35+1	2	0	0	0+1	0	0	0
5	DF	(England) ENG	Tyrone Mings	37	2	36	2	0	0	1	0	0	0
18	DF	(England) ENG	Matt Targett	38	0	38	0	0	0	0	0	0	0
22	DF	(Belgium) BEL	Björn Engels	0	0	0	0	0	0	0	0	0	0
27	DF	(Egypt) EGY	Ahmed Elmohamady	17	0	8+6	0	0	0	3	0	0	0
30	DF	(England) ENG	Kortney Hause	10	1	7	1	0	0	3	0	0	0
37	DF	(England) ENG	Mungo Bridge	1	0	0	0	1	0	0	0	0	0
46	DF	(England) ENG	Jake Walker	1	0	0	0	1	0	0	0	0	0
62	DF	(England) ENG	Kaine Kesler	1	0	0	0	1	0	0	0	0	0
72	DF	(Netherlands) NED	Sil Swinkels	1	0	0	0	0+1	0	0	0	0	0
73	DF	(England) ENG	Edward Rowe	1	0	0	0	0+1	0	0	0	0	0
Midfielders
6	MF	(Brazil) BRA	Douglas Luiz	34	0	32+1	0	0	0	0+1	0	0	0
7	MF	(Scotland) SCO	John McGinn	37	3	37	3	0	0	0	0	0	0
10	MF	(England) ENG	Jack Grealish	27	7	24+2	6	0	0	1	1	0	0
17	MF	(Egypt) EGY	Trézéguet	22	2	12+9	2	0	0	0+1	0	0	0
19	MF	(Zimbabwe) ZIM	Marvelous Nakamba	16	0	9+4	0	0	0	3	0	0	0
20	MF	(England) ENG	Ross Barkley	24	3	18+6	3	0	0	0	0	0	0
21	MF	(Netherlands) NED	Anwar El Ghazi	31	11	17+11	10	0	0	3	1	0	0
25	MF	(France) FRA	Morgan Sanson	9	0	3+6	0	0	0	0	0	0	0
41	MF	(England) ENG	Jacob Ramsey	25	0	6+16	0	0	0	3	0	0	0
50	MF	(England) ENG	Harrison Sohna	1	0	0	0	0+1	0	0	0	0	0
52	MF	(England) ENG	Jaden Philogene	1	0	0+1	0	0	0	0	0	0	0
57	MF	(England) ENG	Ben Chrisene	1	0	0	0	1	0	0	0	0	0
60	MF	(England) ENG	Carney Chukwuemeka	2	0	0+2	0	0	0	0	0	0	0
67	MF	(England) ENG	Arjan Raikhy	1	0	0	0	1	0	0	0	0	0
68	MF	(England) ENG	Brad Young	1	0	0	0	0+1	0	0	0	0	0
69	MF	(Spain) ESP	Mamadou Sylla	1	0	0	0	1	0	0	0	0	0
70	MF	(Netherlands) NED	Lamare Bogarde	1	0	0	0	1	0	0	0	0	0
71	MF	(England) ENG	Hayden Lindley	1	0	0	0	0+1	0	0	0	0	0
Forwards
9	FW	(Brazil) BRA	Wesley	3	0	0+3	0	0	0	0	0	0	0
11	FW	(England) ENG	Ollie Watkins	40	16	37	14	0	0	1+2	2	0	0
15	FW	(Burkina Faso) BFA	Bertrand Traoré	37	8	28+7	7	0	0	2	1	0	0
39	FW	(England) ENG	Keinan Davis	18	2	1+14	1	0	0	2+1	1	0	0
61	FW	(England) ENG	Louie Barry	1	1	0	0	1	1	0	0	0	0
Players transferred or loaned out during the season
8	MF	(England) ENG	Henri Lansbury	3	0	0	0	0	0	3	0	0	0
14	MF	(Republic of Ireland) IRL	Conor Hourihane	5	1	3+1	1	0	0	0+1	0	0	0
23	MF	(Spain) ESP	Jota	2	0	0	0	0	0	0+2	0	0	0
24	DF	(France) FRA	Frédéric Guilbert	2	0	0	0	0	0	2	0	0	0
25	GK	(Norway) NOR	Ørjan Nyland	1	0	0	0	0	0	1	0	0	0
28	GK	(Croatia) CRO	Lovre Kalinić	0	0	0	0	0	0	0	0	0	0
42	DF	(England) ENG	Dominic Revan	1	0	0	0	1	0	0	0	0	0
47	DF	(England) ENG	Callum Rowe	1	0	0	0	1	0	0	0	0	0

Disciplinary Records
Player	Position	Premier League		EFL Cup		FA Cup		Other		Total	
Player	Position	Y	R	Y	R	Y	R	Y	R	Y	R
(Brazil) Douglas Luiz	CM	8	1	0	0	0	0	0	0	8	1
(England) Matty Cash	RB	6	1	0	0	0	0	0	0	6	1
(England) Tyrone Mings	CB	4	1	0	0	0	0	0	0	4	1
(England) Ollie Watkins	CF	2	1	0	0	0	0	0	0	2	1
(Scotland) John McGinn	CM	12	0	0	0	0	0	0	0	12	0
(England) Matt Targett	LB	7	0	0	0	0	0	0	0	7	0
(England) Jack Grealish	CAM	6	0	0	0	0	0	0	0	6	0
(England) Ezri Konsa	CB	3	0	0	0	0	0	0	0	3	0
(Zimbabwe) Marvelous Nakamba	CM	3	0	0	0	0	0	0	0	3	0
(France) Morgan Sanson	CM	3	0	0	0	0	0	0	0	3	0
(Egypt) Ahmed Elmohamady	RB	2	0	0	0	0	0	0	0	2	0
(Netherlands) Anwar El Ghazi	LW	2	0	0	0	0	0	0	0	2	0
(England) Jacob Ramsey	CM	0	0	2	0	0	0	0	0	2	0
(England) Kortney Hause	CB	2	0	0	0	0	0	0	0	2	0
(Burkina Faso) Bertrand Traoré	FW	1	0	0	0	0	0	0	0	1	0
(Argentina) Emiliano Martínez	GK	1	0	0	0	0	0	0	0	1	0
(England) Keinan Davis	CF	0	0	1	0	0	0	0	0	1	0
(Wales) Neil Taylor	LB	1	0	0	0	0	0	0	0	1	0
TOTAL		61	4	3	0	0	0	0	0	64	4

Based on matches played until 23 May 2021

Top Scorers
Player	Position	Premier League		EFL Cup		FA Cup		Other		Total	
		Goals	Assists	Goals	Assists	Goals	Assists	Goals	Assists	Goals	Assists
(England) Ollie Watkins	CF	14	5	2	0	0	0	0	0	16	5
(Netherlands) Anwar El Ghazi	LW	10	0	1	0	0	0	0	0	11	0
(Burkina Faso) Bertrand Traoré	FW	7	6	1	0	0	0	0	0	8	6
(England) Jack Grealish	CAM	6	10	1	0	0	0	0	0	7	10
(Scotland) John McGinn	CM	3	5	0	0	0	0	0	0	3	5
(England) Ross Barkley	CM	3	1	0	0	0	0	0	0	3	1
Own goal	N/A	3	0	0	0	0	0	0	0	3	0
(England) Keinan Davis	CF	1	1	1	1	0	0	0	0	2	2
(Egypt) Trézéguet	LW	2	1	0	1	0	0	0	0	2	2
(England) Tyrone Mings	CB	2	2	0	0	0	0	0	0	2	2
(England) Ezri Konsa	CB	2	0	0	0	0	0	0	0	2	0
(Republic of Ireland) Conor Hourihane	CM	1	1	0	0	0	0	0	0	1	1
(England) Louie Barry	CF	0	0	0	0	1	0	0	0	1	0
(England) Kortney Hause	CB	1	0	0	0	0	0	0	0	1	0
(Brazil) Douglas Luiz	CM	0	2	0	1	0	0	0	0	0	3
(England) Matt Targett	LB	0	2	0	0	0	0	0	0	0	2
(England) Matty Cash	RB	0	2	0	0	0	0	0	0	0	2
(England) Callum Rowe	LB	0	0	0	0	0	1	0	0	0	1
(England) Henri Lansbury	CM	0	0	0	1	0	0	0	0	0	1
(England) Jacob Ramsey	CM	0	0	0	1	0	0	0	0	0	1
(Wales) Neil Taylor	LB	0	0	0	1	0	0	0	0	0	1
TOTAL		55	38	6	6	1	1	0	0	62	45

Based on matches played until 23 May 2021
