= Örebro Syrianska IF =

Swedish football club

- Full name: Örebro Syrianska Idrottsförening
- Short name: ÖSIF
- Founded: 1977; 49 years ago
- Ground: Örnsro IP, Örebro
- Manager: Barsaum Cicek
- League: Ettan Norra
- 2025: Ettan Norra, 15th of 16
Home colours	Away colours

Örebro Syrianska IF is a Swedish football club from Örebro.

== History ==
In 1977 the first Syrian team was created in the Swedish sports movement. Örebro City became the first city to get a Syriac-Aramean football club. The Örebro Syrianska was founded in the year 1977, just a few months earlier than its sibling association Syrianska FC Södertälje.

For its first few years, Örebro Syrianska played in the lower leagues, and in 1986 it was to take the leap for the first time up to Division 6. Unfortunately, the team only had a brief spell in Division 6, as the lack of planning was the reason they stayed for only one season.

The second attempt to be promoted to the league came in 1989, and it was a success. It managed to remain in both sporting and economic terms.

The year 1993 was historic in several ways in Örebro Syrianska history when it advanced for the first time to Division 5. During the following years they stayed in Division 5. Mats Johansson was a success and wrote the story for Örebro Syrianska in 1994, and was able to salvage their status as a Division 4 team. However, there were only two seasons in Division 4, and then the team plummeted straight down the league system, back to Division 6.

The recovery came by winning Division 6 in 1999. The following year the team won Division 5 as a newcomer and from 2002 has remained in Division 4. In 2005, they came close to qualifying for a place in Division 3. A year later, however, Örebro Syrianska IF were promoted to Division 3 after winning the league in 2006, managed by Melke Alan.

In their first year in Division 3 (Western Svealand) the team finished in 6th place. It managed to attract players from the famous football powers such as Brazil and Argentina.

Örebro Syrianska focused on advancement to the Division 2 in 2008. This was an initiative that was nearly completed. The season didn't start well after a change of manager, who changed the team shape and the game by playing coaches Samuel Mokede and Nuri Aykal. This, in turn, paved the way for a five-way challenge for the title. The whole thing was settled in the last two rounds but unfortunately the team drew. Attributed to fifth place, the season was seen as satisfying, establishing itself as a top team.

2009 was the year when Hans Kallen and Peter Goransson led Örebro Syrianska in Division 3 (Western Svealand). It ended with an honourable sixth place after turning over a lot of players and using a relatively young squad. Örebro Syrianska was competing at the top up until halfway into the season but slowed towards the end of the season.

In 2010, the team aimed to advance up a notch in the league system. After a sluggish season, Ossie Selimovic entered the club as head coach. At the end of the season, the team occupied a play-off position, and played against Spårvägens FF. After a 2-2 draw away from home, the Red and Yellow lost 3-2 to miss out on promotion and remain in Division 3.

Another new head coach was appointed in 2011, Nuri Abrahamsson. After some new acquisitions as sports committee enlisted, the team went on a high-class training camp to Turkey in pre-season. The season started well, hitting the top of the table in Division 3, but with an abysmal away games record Örebro Syrianska qualified only for a play-off position again. The opponents were IK Huge. The teams played out a 1-1 draw, followed by a 3-0 win for Örebro Syrianska. In the next round of the play-off, Falu FK were too strong for them. The tie ended 3-2 on aggregate to Falu and once again, Örebro Syrianska found themselves in Division 3.

In 2012, the season followed a repeat of the previous two, but was ultimately defined by an economic crisis which meant that all player and coaching contracts had to be terminated. The players decided to step up and help the club. As with the previous two years, the season started well, but a strong home record was matched with a weak away record leaving Örebro Syrianska to face the play-offs for the third season in a row. The opponents on this occasion were Hille IF. Advancing to the final round, they faced Rotebro IS. A very late equaliser in the game ensured that Rotebro would stay in Division 2 and the Red and Yellow would remain in Division 3.

The following year, 2013, Örebro Syrianska consolidated their place in the 5th tier, but in 2014, they finally achieved their aim of promotion to Division 2, their highest-ever position in their history. The team spent six seasons at this level, switching between the different leagues of the fifth-tier, before winning the Norra Götaland title and being promoted, for the first time, to the Ettan, where they have remained ever since.

== Current squad ==
As of 1 September 2025

Note: Flags indicate national team as defined under FIFA eligibility rules; some limited exceptions apply. Players may hold more than one non-FIFA nationality.

No.	Pos.	Nation	Player
1	GK	SWE	Oscar Franck
2	DF	SWE	Oscar Windahl
3	DF	SWE	Swaibou Conta
4	DF	SWE	Carl Wärme
5	DF	SWE	Amer Jusic
6	DF	SWE	Hugo Nilsson
7	FW	SLE	Christian Moses
8	MF	SWE	Allen Smajić (on loan from Landskrona BoIS)
9	FW	SWE	Robin Hadad
10	FW	SWE	Philip Malky
11	FW	SWE	Bilal Fousseni
13	GK	SWE	Kwesi Kawawa
14	MF	SWE	Hamse Shagaxle (on loan from Örebro)

No.	Pos.	Nation	Player
16	MF	ESP	Mamadou Sylla
17	FW	SYR	Peter Ilia
18	MF	SWE	Abdikhaliq Mohamud
19	MF	SWE	Lukas Vikgren (on loan from Umeå)
20	DF	SWE	Hassan Abdi Hassan
21	MF	SWE	Jakob Norrman
22	MF	SWE	Isac Spanedal
23	DF	SWE	Djoseph Bangala (on loan from Umeå)
24	MF	SWE	De Pievre Ilunga
25	MF	SWE	Konrad Gustafsson
42	DF	SWE	Charles Sampson
—	MF	SWE	Henry Hertzman

=== Out on loan ===
Note: Flags indicate national team as defined under FIFA eligibility rules; some limited exceptions apply. Players may hold more than one non-FIFA nationality.

No.	Pos.	Nation	Player

== See also ==
- Assyrians in Sweden
- List of Assyrian football teams in Sweden
