= Louie Barry =

English footballer (born 2003)

- Barry with Sheffield Wednesday in 2026

Personal information
- Full name: Louie Mark Barry
- Date of birth: 21 June 2003 (age 23)
- Place of birth: Sutton Coldfield, England
- Positions: Striker; winger

Team information
- Current team: Sheffield Wednesday
- Number: 11

Youth career
- –2009: Sutton United
- 2009–2019: West Bromwich Albion
- 2019–2020: Barcelona
- 2020–2021: Aston Villa

Senior career*
Years	Team	Apps	(Gls)
2021–2026	Aston Villa	0	(0)
2021–2022	→ Ipswich Town (loan)	2	(0)
2022	→ Swindon Town (loan)	14	(6)
2022–2023	→ Milton Keynes Dons (loan)	22	(1)
2023	→ Salford City (loan)	19	(2)
2023–2024	→ Stockport County (loan)	20	(9)
2024–2025	→ Stockport County (loan)	23	(15)
2025	→ Hull City (loan)	4	(0)
2025–2026	→ Sheffield United (loan)	9	(0)
2026	→ Stockport County (loan)	6	(3)
2026–	Sheffield Wednesday	6	(3)

International career
2017–2018	England U15	10	(5)
2018	Republic of Ireland U15		
2019	Republic of Ireland U16		
2019	England U16	10	(7)
2019–2020	England U17	4	(2)
2021	England U18	1	(0)
- * Club domestic league appearances and goals as of 22:00, 20 November 2026 (UTC)

Louie Mark Barry (born 21 June 2003) is an English professional footballer who plays as a striker and winger for EFL League One club Sheffield Wednesday.

Having spent a decade in the West Bromwich Albion Academy, he moved to Barcelona in 2019, in their famed La Masia academy. He subsequently joined the Aston Villa Academy in 2020.

Barry represented both England and the Republic of Ireland at youth international level. He declared his intention to play senior international football for Ireland in August 2025.

== Early and personal life ==
Barry was born in Sutton Coldfield, and has dual British and Irish citizenship. He attended Bishop Walsh Catholic School. In February 2020, he said that he had been an Aston Villa fan his entire life.

== Club career ==
=== Early career ===
Barry played for local Sutton Coldfield side, Sutton United as an under-8 where he played with future teammate Tim Iroegbunam. Barry joined the West Bromwich Albion academy at the age of six, and by 2018 had progressed to the under-U21 squad.

=== Barcelona ===
After spending ten years with West Bromwich Albion, Barry signed a three-year contract with Spanish club Barcelona in July 2019. He had previously been close to signing for French club Paris Saint-Germain. Sources claimed that he became the first English-born player to live in the residence at the academy La Masia, however, London-born Ian Poveda had also been a player there seven years prior. In September 2019 it was announced that Albion were going to report Barcelona to FIFA over the transfer, claiming that they had not received the compensation they were due. Barcelona contested this, however, stating that they did not believe that his scholarship for Albion had any international standing, and that they would wait for the verdict from FIFA. He subsequently had to wait three months for his international registration to be confirmed which meant he missed the first seven matches of the Barcelona under-19 season. A judge ultimately ruled in favour of Barcelona and in November 2021 stated that Albion were due no further compensation.

Barry made his debut for Barcelona's under-19 side in October 2019, scoring on his first start, in a 6–0 victory against Ebro. He made ten competitive under-19 appearances in the league and UEFA Youth League for Barcelona in the 2019–20 season, scoring twice. His side were declared U19 league champions in May 2020, a few months after Barry left the club, after the COVID-19 pandemic curtailed the youth season.

=== Aston Villa ===
In January 2020, he held talks with Aston Villa, signing for them later that month for a fee of £880,000, which could rise to £3.5m with add-ons. Barry signed a three-year contract, as this is the maximum allowed for a player of his age – with an agreement of an automatic further three years at the end of that. He made his debut for the club's U23 team on 23 January, shortly before he was officially unveiled by the Midlands club. He came on to score the equaliser in a 2–1 win over Cardiff City. In June he spent time training with the Aston Villa first team, then made a first appearance in the EFL Trophy with the club's under-21 side four months later.

On 8 January 2021, after ten of Villa's first-team players tested positive for COVID-19, Barry was selected to make his debut in the FA Cup third round against Liverpool. Barry scored to equalise the game at 1–1, before Liverpool went on to win 4–1. Barry's performance prompted the Liverpool manager, Jürgen Klopp, to refer to the youngster as "Little Jamie Vardy". The goal was voted 'Goal of the Round' by BBC Sport readers. On 24 May 2021, Barry was part of the Aston Villa under-18 squad that won the FA Youth Cup, beating Liverpool U18s 2–1 in the final. On 7 July 2021, Villa announced that they had exercised an option in Barry's contract to automatically extend it until 2024.

==== Loans to Ipswich Town and Swindon Town ====
On 6 August 2021, Barry signed for League One side Ipswich Town on a season-long loan. He made his debut on 10 August 2021, in a 1–0 EFL Cup defeat to Newport County. He made his Football League debut four days later in a 2–1 defeat at Burton Albion. After finding game time limited at Ipswich, Barry returned to Villa in January, having made 6 appearances during his loan.

On 28 January 2022, Barry signed for League Two side Swindon Town on loan for the remainder of the season. He made his debut on 1 February 2022, as a second-half substitute in a 1–1 draw against Crawley Town. On 19 February, he scored his first senior league goal, in a 3–0 away victory over Carlisle United.

==== Loans to Milton Keynes Dons and Salford City ====
On 12 July 2022, Barry joined League One club Milton Keynes Dons until the end of the 2022–23 season. He made his debut on 30 July 2022 as a 61st-minute substitute in a 1–0 defeat away to Cambridge United.

On 30 January 2023, Barry had his Milton Keynes Dons loan terminated, to facilitate a loan move to Salford City until the end of the season.

==== Loans to Stockport County ====
On 28 July 2023, Barry signed a contract extension with Aston Villa, and on the same day joined League Two club Stockport County on a season-long loan. Having scored in all five of his team's fixtures, assisting a further three goals, Barry was awarded both the EFL Young Player of the Month and the EFL League Two Player of the Month award for September 2023. In October 2023, he suffered a hamstring injury that would rule him out for up to four months. Having ultimately missed six months of action, he made his first-team return in April 2024.

On 2 August 2024, Barry signed another contract extension with Villa and re-joined Stockport County for a second season on loan. He had an impressive start to the season, scoring three goals and being named the EFL League One Player of the Month for August 2024. He also became only the fourth player to win the EFL Young Player of the Month for a second time, also for August. Following four goals and two assists in November, he was named League One Player of the Month for a second time.

On 22 December 2024, it was announced that Barry would be recalled by Aston Villa following County's fixture of 1 January 2025.

==== Loans to Hull City and Sheffield United ====
On 29 January 2025, Barry joined Championship side Hull City on loan for the remainder of the season.

On 22 July 2025, after the collapse of an arranged £3.5 million permanent transfer to Hull City, Barry joined Sheffield United on a season-long loan. On 3 January 2026, Barry was recalled to Aston Villa after only making nine appearances for Sheffield United in the first half of the season.

==== Return to Stockport County ====
In February 2026 he returned on loan to Stockport County. In April 2026 he was sent off in his first appearance back having come on as a late substitute, a 2–2 draw against Bolton Wanderers. He scored in the semi-final as the club qualified for the 2026 EFL League One playoff final.

=== Sheffield Wednesday ===
On 9 July 2026, Barry signed a four-year contract with a club option of an additional year with EFL League One club Sheffield Wednesday, signing for an undisclosed fee. He was one of eight players to make their debut against Bolton Wanderers in the EFL Cup, replacing Jarvis Thornton in a 1–0 win. On 29 August 2026, he scored a brace in a 7–2 victory against Bromley, his first goals for Sheffield Wednesday. The following game against Wycombe Wanderers saw him score his third goal in two games, but later in the match he was substituted after injuring his ankle, and was later seen on crutches and with a protective boot leaving the stadium. It was later revealed he had sustained an ankle ligament injury and was set for up to three months on the sidelines. He returned to the first team against Plymouth Argyle in November, which was his former Stockport County manager Dave Challinor's first league match as Sheffield Wednesday boss.

== International career ==
Barry has represented England at under-15, under-16 and under-17 youth levels. He is also eligible to represent the Republic of Ireland, and has represented the Republic of Ireland at under-15 and under-16 level in 2017 and 2018 In 2018, Barry scored ten goals in five games for the England under-15 side at a tournament in Italy.

In 2019, Barry was part of the England under-17 side that were victorious in the Syrenka Cup. He started the final and assisted Jamal Musiala for one of England's goals against hosts Poland, a 2–2 draw which England subsequently won on penalties.

By February 2020 he had scored 21 goals in 20 games for England's youth teams.

On 29 March 2021, Barry made his debut for England U18s during a 2–0 win away to Wales at the Leckwith Stadium.

In August 2025, senior Republic of Ireland manager Heimir Hallgrímsson stated that Barry had switched his international allegiance and had come into his consideration for a call-up to the squad for their September fixtures.

== Career statistics ==
As of match played 20 November 2026

Appearances and goals by club, season and competition
Club	Season	League			FA Cup		EFL Cup		Other		Total	
Club	Season	Division	Apps	Goals	Apps	Goals	Apps	Goals	Apps	Goals	Apps	Goals
Aston Villa U21	2020–21	—							1 (Note: Appearance(s) in EFL Trophy)	0	1	0
Aston Villa	2020–21	Premier League	0	0	1	1	0	0	—		1	1
Aston Villa	2021–22	Premier League	0	0	0	0	0	0	—		0	0
Aston Villa	2022–23	Premier League	0	0	0	0	0	0	—		0	0
Aston Villa	2023–24	Premier League	0	0	0	0	0	0	—		0	0
Aston Villa	2024–25	Premier League	0	0	0	0	0	0	—		0	0
Aston Villa	2025–26	Premier League	0	0	0	0	0	0	—		0	0
Aston Villa	Total		0	0	1	1	0	0	0	0	1	1
Ipswich Town (loan)	2021–22	League One	2	0	0	0	1	0	3	0	6	0
Swindon Town (loan)	2021–22	League Two	14	6	0	0	0	0	2 (Note: Appearance(s) in League Two play-offs)	0	16	6
Milton Keynes Dons (loan)	2022–23	League One	22	1	2	0	3	0	5	0	32	1
Salford City (loan)	2022–23	League Two	19	2	0	0	0	0	2	0	21	2
Stockport County (loan)	2023–24	League Two	20	9	0	0	1	0	1	0	22	9
Stockport County (loan)	2024–25	League One	23	15	0	0	0	0	1	1	24	16
Hull City (loan)	2024–25	Championship	4	0	0	0	0	0	—		4	0
Sheffield United (loan)	2025–26	Championship	9	0	0	0	0	0	—		9	0
Stockport County (loan)	2025–26	League One	6	3	0	0	0	0	4 (Note: One appearance in the EFL Trophy and three appearances in the League One Play-offs)	1	10	4
Sheffield Wednesday	2026–27	League One	6	3	0	0	2	0	0	0	8	3
Career total			125	39	3	1	7	0	19	2	154	42

== Honours ==
Barcelona U19

- División de Honor Juvenil: 2019–20

Aston Villa U18

- FA Youth Cup: 2020–21

Stockport County

- EFL League Two: 2023–24
- EFL Trophy runner-up: 2025–26

England U16

- Tournoi Val-de-Marne: 2018

England U17

- Syrenka Cup: 2019

Individual

- Tournoi Val-de-Marne – Top Goalscorer: 2018
- Premier League 2 – Player of the Month: January 2021
- EFL League Two Player of the Month: September 2023
- EFL Young Player of the Month: September 2023, August 2024
- EFL League One Player of the Month: August 2024, November 2024
