= FC Lion Pride =

Lion Pride
- Full name: FC Lion Pride
- Founded: 2005
- Manager: Erik Rasmussen
- League: Sierra Leone National Second Division

FC Lion Pride is a humanitarian football team based in Sierra Leone. The team donates a percentage of profits from sales of players to humanitarian causes. A number of their players have had trials at major Danish clubs.
