= 2018–19 Aston Villa F.C. season =

English football club season

Aston Villa
2018–19 season
- Chairman: Nassef Sawiris
- Manager: Steve Bruce (until 3 October); Dean Smith (from 10 October)
- Stadium: Villa Park
- Championship: 5th (promoted via play-offs)
- Play-offs: Winners
- FA Cup: Third round
- EFL Cup: Second round
- Top goalscorer: League: Tammy Abraham (25); All: Tammy Abraham (26)
- Highest home attendance: 41,696 vs Norwich City, 5 May 2019
- Lowest home attendance: 27,331 vs Preston North End, 2 October 2018
- Average home league attendance: 36,029
- Biggest win: 4–0 vs Derby County, 2 March 2019
- Biggest defeat: 1–4 vs Sheffield United, 1 September 2018
Home colours	Away colours	Third colours

Second City Derby
- 59--37--32

The 2018-19 season was Aston Villa's 3rd season in the Football League Championship. The 2018–19 EFL Championship season was Villa's 144th season in English football. It was the club's third consecutive season in the Championship following relegation from the Premier League in the 2015–16 season. Villa finished in fifth place and were the winners of the subsequent play-offs to achieve promotion to the Premier League.

In July 2018, a consortium consisting of Nassef Sawiris and fellow billionaire Wes Edens, referring to themselves as NSWE, purchased a 55% controlling stake worth £30m in Aston Villa. The club had faced significant cash flow issues under previous owner Tony Xia, and faced a potential winding-up order by HMRC, following an unpaid £4m tax bill. Following the takeover, NSWE invested significant funds into addressing said issues.

Villa surrendered a two-goal lead, drawing 3–3 at home to bottom club Preston North End on 2 October 2018. One spectator threw a cabbage at manager, Steve Bruce, and there were calls from home fans on the Holte End for Bruce to go. The following day, he was sacked by Villa after a poor run of form. A week later, Dean Smith was appointed manager with the club in 15th place, with John Terry as his assistant coach.

Smith was named as the EFL's manager of the week after overseeing a 3–0 win at Derby County on 10 November. He immediately managed to reinvigorate the "Villans" attack, and only a controversial injury-time equaliser from local rivals West Bromwich Albion at The Hawthorns denied them a place in the play-offs by 7 December. However Villa's form dipped dramatically in the three months after Jack Grealish was sidelined with a shin injury picked up in that match, but on 2 March, Smith gave Grealish the captaincy on his return to the first-team and the 23-year old inspired an important 4–0 victory over play-off rivals Derby County and went on to captain the team from that game onwards.

Smith was given that month's EFL Championship Manager of the Month award after achieving five wins in five games, including a 1–0 victory over Second City derby rivals Birmingham City on 10 March with Grealish scoring the only goal. Earlier in the match, Grealish was "punched from behind by a pitch invader" who was then sent to prison for 14 weeks for pitch encroachment and assault. Following Villa's promotion, the teams have not met since.

On 22 April 2019, the team surpassed a 109 year old club record for longest winning run after defeating Millwall 1–0 at Villa Park to make it 10 successive victories in 10 matches. The record had previously been held at nine straight wins. On 11 May, the new manager oversaw his 18th win with Aston Villa as they came from behind to beat West Brom 2–1 in the first leg of the Championship play-off semi-finals. Three days later, Villa came from behind at West Brom to win on penalties and secure a place in the play-off final. Villa went on to win promotion to the Premier League with a 2–1 victory over Derby County.

== Competitions ==
=== Pre-season friendlies ===
Villa announced friendlies with AFC Telford United, Kidderminster Harriers, Walsall and Dynamo Dresden.

14 July 2018 Friendly	AFC Telford United	0–3	Aston Villa	Telford
15:00 BST		Report	Kodjia 19', 74'; Hourihane 81'	Stadium: New Bucks Head; Attendance: 1,390

14 July 2018 Friendly	Kidderminster Harriers	1–1	Aston Villa	Kidderminster
15:00 BST	Horsfall 9'	Report	Knibbs 11'	Stadium: Aggborough Stadium; Attendance: 2,146

17 July 2018 Friendly	Walsall	1–4	Aston Villa	Bescot
19:45 BST	Guthrie 68'	Report	Hourihane 4', 23', 54'; Whelan 39'	Stadium: Banks's Stadium; Attendance: 3,501

21 July 2018 Bass Charity Vase	Burton Albion	0–4	Aston Villa	Burton upon Trent
15:00 BST		Report	Kodjia 5'; Adomah 51'; De Laet 58'; Gardner 75'	Stadium: Pirelli Stadium; Attendance: 2,890

25 July 2018 Friendly	Aston Villa	1–3	West Ham United	Birmingham
19:45 BST	Green 85'	Report	Antonio 10'; Arnautović 27'; Snodgrass 84'	Stadium: Villa Park; Referee: Darren Bond

28 July 2018 Friendly	Dynamo Dresden (Germany)	1–2	Aston Villa	Dresden
14:00 BST	Koné 25'	Report	Green 55', 59'	Stadium: Stadion Dresden; Attendance: 9,768

=== Championship ===
==== League table ====
Pos	Team	Pld	W	D	L	GF	GA	GD	Pts	Promotion, qualification or relegation
2	Sheffield United (P)	46	26	11	9	78	41	+37	89	Promotion to the Premier League
3	Leeds United	46	25	8	13	73	50	+23	83	Qualification for Championship play-offs (Note: Four teams play for one spot and promotion to the Premier League.)
4	West Bromwich Albion	46	23	11	12	87	62	+25	80	Qualification for Championship play-offs
5	Aston Villa (O, P)	46	20	16	10	82	61	+21	76	Qualification for Championship play-offs
6	Derby County	46	20	14	12	69	54	+15	74	Qualification for Championship play-offs
7	Middlesbrough	46	20	13	13	49	41	+8	73	
8	Bristol City	46	19	13	14	59	53	+6	70	

Source: Sky Sports Archived 25 September 2019 at the Wayback Machine
Rules for classification: 1) Points; 2) Goal difference; 3) Number of goals scored; 4) Head-to-head results
(O) Play-off winners; (P) Promoted

==== Results by matchday ====
Matchday	1	2	3	4	5	6	7	8	9	10	11	12	13	14	15	16	17	18	19	20	21	22	23	24	25	26	27	28	29	30	31	32	33	34	35	36	37	38	39	40	41	42	43	44	45	46
Ground	A	H	A	H	H	A	A	H	H	A	H	A	H	A	A	H	A	H	H	A	A	H	H	A	A	H	A	H	H	A	H	A	H	A	H	A	A	H	H	A	A	H	A	H	A	H
Result	W	W	D	D	D	L	D	W	L	D	D	L	W	L	L	W	W	W	D	W	D	D	L	W	D	D	L	D	W	D	D	L	L	D	W	W	W	W	W	W	W	W	W	W	D	L
Position	2	2	4	5	4	12	12	6	12	15	12	15	13	16	16	13	11	8	8	8	8	8	11	9	9	10	12	12	10	9	8	10	10	11	11	9	8	6	5	5	5	5	5	5	5	5

Updated to match(es) played on 5 May 2019. Source: BBC Sport
A = Away; H = Home; W = Win; D = Draw; L = Loss

==== Result summary ====
Overall								Home						Away					
Pld	W	D	L	GF	GA	GD	Pts	W	D	L	GF	GA	GD	W	D	L	GF	GA	GD
46	20	16	10	82	61	+21	76	11	8	4	50	36	+14	9	8	6	32	25	+7

Last updated: 5 May 2019.
Source: BBC Sport

==== Matches ====
On 21 June 2018, the Championship fixtures for the forthcoming season were announced.

6 August 2018 1	Hull City	1–3	Aston Villa	Kingston upon Hull
19:45 BST	Evandro 7'	Report	Elphick 14'; Elmohamady 70'; Hutton 75'; Hutton (yellow card) 76'; Bjarnason (yellow card) 90'	Stadium: KCOM Stadium; Attendance: 14,071 (2,035 away); Referee: Andrew Madley

11 August 2018 2	Aston Villa	3–2	Wigan Athletic	Aston
15:00 BST	Chester 13'; Dunkley , 63' (o.g.); Grealish (yellow card) 86'; Bjarnason 90+4'	Report	Powell 41'; McManaman (yellow card) 50'; Connolly 55'; Morsy (yellow card) 58'; Dunkley (yellow card) 66'; Evans (yellow card) 90+3'	Stadium: Villa Park; Attendance: 34,331 (1,344 away); Referee: Jeremy Simpson

18 August 2018 3	Ipswich Town	1–1	Aston Villa	Ipswich
15:00 BST	Chalobah 36'; Edun (yellow card) 29' (yellow-red card) 39'; Donacien (yellow card) 49'	Report	Kodjia 21'; Hutton (yellow card) 65'; McGinn (yellow card) 80'	Stadium: Portman Road; Attendance: 17,824 (2,027 away); Referee: Tim Robinson

21 August 2018 4	Aston Villa	2–2	Brentford	Aston
19:45 BST	Kodjia (yellow card) 16' (goal) 21', 90+5'; Chester (yellow card) 67'; Grealish (yellow card) 68'	Report	Maupay 23', 82'; Watkins (yellow card) 32'; Benrahma (yellow card) 75'	Stadium: Villa Park; Attendance: 30,011 (690 away); Referee: Jon Moss

25 August 2018 5	Aston Villa	1–1	Reading	Aston
15:00 BST	Elmohamady 51'	Report	Méïté (yellow card) 58'; Sims (yellow card) 70'; Baldock 90+3' (pen.)	Stadium: Villa Park; Attendance: 33,405 (833 away); Referee: Darren England

1 September 2018 6	Sheffield United	4–1	Aston Villa	Sheffield
15:00 BST	O'Connell 6'; Duffy 23'; Basham (yellow card) 27'; Norwood 41'; Sharp 49'	Report	El Ghazi 61'; Grealish (yellow card) 83'	Stadium: Bramall Lane; Attendance: 26,030 (2,247 away); Referee: James Linington

15 September 2018 7	Blackburn Rovers	1–1	Aston Villa	Blackburn
17:30 BST	Evans (yellow card) 47'; Lenihan (yellow card) 53'; Dack 76'; Reed (yellow card) 86'	Report	McGinn (yellow card) 18'; Hourihane 90+3'; Bolasie (yellow card) 90+6'	Stadium: Ewood Park; Attendance: 15,982 (3,998 away); Referee: Steve Martin

18 September 2018 8	Aston Villa	2–0	Rotherham United	Aston
19:45 BST	Abraham 27' (yellow card) 68'; El Ghazi (yellow card) 37'; Bolasie 82'	Report	Ajayi (yellow card) 65'; Mattock (yellow card) 73'	Stadium: Villa Park; Attendance: 27,991 (411 away); Referee: Andy Davies

22 September 2018 9	Aston Villa	1–2	Sheffield Wednesday	Aston
15:00 BST	Chester (yellow card) 8'; McGinn 53' (yellow card) 55'	Report	Baker (yellow card) 36'; Matias 49'; Fletcher 67'	Stadium: Villa Park; Attendance: 35,572 (2,600 away); Referee: David Webb

28 September 2018 10	Bristol City	1–1	Aston Villa	Bristol
20:00 BST	Brownhill 16'; Hunt (yellow card) 46'; Taylor (yellow card) 57'	Report	Kodjia (yellow card) 16'; Bjarnason 45+3'; Hutton (yellow card) 62'	Stadium: Ashton Gate; Attendance: 24,224 (3,438 away); Referee: Tim Robinson

2 October 2018 11	Aston Villa	3–3	Preston North End	Aston
19:45 BST	Kodjia 26'; Abraham 37'; Chester (red card) 54'; Grealish (yellow card) 71'; McGinn (yellow card) 78'; Bolasie 90+1'; Whelan (penalty missed) 90+6'	Report	Johnson 56' (pen.) (yellow card) 90+5'; Davies (yellow card) 64'; Gallagher 79'; Moult 86' (yellow card) 87'; Pearson (yellow card) 89'	Stadium: Villa Park; Attendance: 27,331 (433 away); Referee: Peter Bankes

6 October 2018 12	Millwall	2–1	Aston Villa	Bermondsey
15:00 BST	Elliott (yellow card) 4', (goal) 48'; Ferguson 26'	Report	Abraham 7'; Bolasie (yellow card) 71'	Stadium: The Den; Attendance: 14,491 (2,214 away); Referee: Tony Harrington

20 October 2018 13	Aston Villa	1–0	Swansea City	Aston
15:00 BST	Abraham 8'; McGinn (yellow card) 85'	Report	Rodon (yellow card) 27'	Stadium: Villa Park; Attendance: 41,326 (2,784 away); Referee: Andrew Madley

23 October 2018 14	Norwich City	2–1	Aston Villa	Norwich
19:45 BST	Zimmermann (yellow card) 5'; Rhodes 54', 73'; Trybull (yellow card) 87'	Report	Chester 19'; Taylor (yellow card) 45'	Stadium: Carrow Road; Attendance: 24,977 (1,188 away); Referee: Simon Hooper

26 October 2018 15	Queens Park Rangers	1–0	Aston Villa	Shepherd's Bush, London
19:45 BST	Lynch (yellow card) 29'; Wszołek 38' (yellow card) 80'; Luongo (yellow card) 82'	Report		Stadium: Loftus Road; Attendance: 16,036 (3,087 away); Referee: Darren England

2 November 2018 16	Aston Villa	2–0	Bolton Wanderers	Aston
19:45 GMT	Grealish 4'; Chester 57'	Report	Olkowski (yellow card) 42'; Wheater (yellow card) 79'; Noone (yellow card) 83'	Stadium: Villa Park; Attendance: 30,802 (509 away); Referee: Oliver Langford

10 November 2018 17	Derby County	0–3	Aston Villa	Derby
15:00 GMT	Huddlestone (yellow card) 84'; Marriott (yellow card) 90+2'; Wilson (yellow card) 90+3'	Report	Adomah (yellow card) 17'; McGinn 74' (yellow card) 76'; Abraham 78'; Hourihane 84'	Stadium: Pride Park Stadium; Attendance: 30,400 (3,160 away); Referee: John Brooks

25 November 2018 18	Aston Villa	4–2	Birmingham City	Aston
12:00 GMT	Kodjia 37'; Grealish 39'; Adomah (yellow card) 41'; Abraham 51' (pen.); Hutton 76' (yellow card) 77'	Report	Jutkiewicz 28' (yellow card) 89'; Pedersen 57'; Harding (yellow card) 62'; Kieftenbeld (yellow card) 90'	Stadium: Villa Park; Attendance: 41,200 (2,100 away); Referee: Robert Jones

28 November 2018 19	Aston Villa	5–5	Nottingham Forest	Aston
19:45 GMT	Abraham 11', 14', 36' (pen.), 71'; Bolasie (yellow card) 20'; Hutton (yellow card) 69'; El Ghazi 75' (yellow card) 87'	Report	Grabban 3', 82'; Carvalho 6'; Cash 22'; Lolley 51'; Yacob (yellow card) 65'; Figueirdo (red card) 68'; Darikwa (yellow card) 69'; Colback (yellow card) 78'	Stadium: Villa Park; Attendance: 32,868 (2,484 away); Referee: Simon Hooper

1 December 2018 20	Middlesbrough	0–3	Aston Villa	Middlesbrough
17:30 GMT	Friend (yellow card) 71'	Report	Chester 20'; Abraham 65'; Whelan 83'	Stadium: Riverside Stadium; Attendance: 22,207 (1,891 away); Referee: Andy Davies

7 December 2018 21	West Bromwich Albion	2–2	Aston Villa	West Bromwich
19:45 GMT	Gayle 28'; Livermore (yellow card) 61'; Hegazi (yellow card) 63'; Rodriguez 90+1'	Report	El Ghazi 12', 59'; Whelan (yellow card) 90+4'	Stadium: The Hawthorns; Attendance: 26,513 (2,600 away); Referee: Darren England

15 December 2018 22	Aston Villa	2–2	Stoke City	Aston
15:00 GMT	Abraham 73' (pen.); Kodjia (yellow card) 82' (goal) 84'; McGinn (yellow card) 90+4'	Report	Ince (yellow card) 31'; Allen 47'; McClean (yellow card) 52'; Pieters (yellow card) 72'; Shawcross (yellow card) 72'; Afobe 78' (pen.)	Stadium: Villa Park; Attendance: 36,999 (2,602 away); Referee: Peter Bankes

23 December 2018 23	Aston Villa	2–3	Leeds United	Aston
13:30 GMT	Abraham 5'; Bolasie (yellow card) 6'; Hourihane 17'; McGinn (yellow card) 81'	Report	Clarke 56'; Jansson 61'; Klich (yellow card) 69'; Alioski (yellow card) 87'; Roofe 90+5' (yellow card) 90+7'	Stadium: Villa Park; Attendance: 41,411 (2,600 away); Referee: Andrew Madley

26 December 2018 24	Swansea City	0–1	Aston Villa	Swansea
15:00 GMT	Naughton (yellow card) 53' van der Hoorn (yellow card) 79'; Bony (penalty missed) 90'	Report	Whelan (yellow card) 21'; Hourihane 65'; McGinn (yellow card) 80'	Stadium: Liberty Stadium; Attendance: 20,775 (2,057 away); Referee: Roger East

29 December 2018 25	Preston North End	1–1	Aston Villa	Preston
15:00 GMT	Johnson (yellow card) 52'; Gallagher (yellow card) 59'; Elmohamady 61' (Own Goal)	Report	Abraham 45' (yellow card) 59'; Hutton (yellow card) 70'	Stadium: Deepdale; Attendance: 19,126 (5,629 away); Referee: Geoff Eltringham

1 January 2019 26	Aston Villa	2–2	Queens Park Rangers	Aston
15:00 GMT	Abraham 21', 75'; Hourihane (yellow card) 45'; Kodjia (yellow card) 49'	Report	Wszołek (yellow card) 30'; Freeman 41'; Eze 57'; Leistner (yellow card) 69'; Osayi-Samuel (yellow card) 90'; Lumley (yellow card) 90+4'; Bidwell (yellow card) 90+10'	Stadium: Villa Park; Attendance: 37,760 (1,038 away); Referee: James Linington

12 January 2019 27	Wigan Athletic	3–0	Aston Villa	Wigan
15:00 GMT	Morsy (yellow card) 13'; Garner (yellow card) 38' (goal) 83' (pen.); Roberts 41'; Windass (yellow card) 66'; Jacobs 79'	Report	Bjarnason (yellow card) 54'; Taylor (yellow card) 64'	Stadium: DW Stadium; Attendance: 13,882 (4,499 away); Referee: Tony Harrington

19 January 2019 28	Aston Villa	2–2	Hull City	Aston
15:00 GMT	Chester 45'; Hourihane (yellow card) 45+3'; Bjarnason (yellow card) 58'; Abraham 64'	Report	Bowen 27' (yellow card) 83'; Evandro 37'; Stewart (yellow card) 40'; Henriksen (yellow card) 45+3'	Stadium: Villa Park; Attendance: 33,619 (1,485 away); Referee: Darren Bond

26 January 2019 29	Aston Villa	2–1	Ipswich Town	Aston
15:00 GMT	Abraham 6', 61' (pen.); El Ghazi (yellow card) 27'; Kalinic (yellow card) 78'; Hourihane (yellow card) 84'	Report	Kenlock (yellow card) 14'; Sears 76'	Stadium: Villa Park; Attendance: 33,653 (1,164 away); Referee: Keith Stroud

2 February 2019 30	Reading	0–0	Aston Villa	Reading
15:00 GMT	Swift (yellow card) 53'; Oliveira (yellow card) 55'; Yiadom (yellow card) 62'	Report	El Ghazi (yellow card) 49'; Whelan (yellow card) 49'; Carroll (yellow card) 87'; Hourihane (yellow card) 90+5'	Stadium: Madejski Stadium; Attendance: 17,458 (2,135 away); Referee: Geoff Eltringham

8 February 2019 31	Aston Villa	3–3	Sheffield United	Aston
19:45 GMT	Jedinak (yellow card) 14'; Hutton (yellow card) 60'; Whelan (yellow card) 73'; Mings 82'; Abraham 86'; Green 90+4'	Report	Sharp 11', 53', 62'; Basham (yellow card) 42'; Egan (yellow card) 72'; Baldock (yellow card) 88'	Stadium: Villa Park; Attendance: 34,892 (2,286 away); Referee: Tony Harrington

13 February 2019 32	Brentford	1–0	Aston Villa	Brentford
19:45 GMT	Maupay 90+1'	Report	Hutton (yellow card) 40'	Stadium: Griffin Park; Attendance: 9,636 (1,610 away); Referee: Gavin Ward

16 February 2019 33	Aston Villa	0–2	West Bromwich Albion	Aston
15:00 GMT	Mings (yellow card) 31'; Hause (yellow card) 38'; McGinn (yellow card) 51'	Report	Holgate (yellow card) 29'; Robson-Kanu 41'; Barry (yellow card) 43'; Rodriguez 45'	Stadium: Villa Park; Attendance: 39,263 (2,167 away); Referee: James Linington

23 February 2019 34	Stoke City	1–1	Aston Villa	Stoke-on-Trent
15:00 GMT	Vokes 5'; Martins Indi (yellow card) 54'; Etebo (yellow card) 57'; Williams (yellow card) 90+2'	Report	Hause (yellow card) 41'; Adomah 62'	Stadium: Bet365 Stadium; Attendance: 27,975 (2,931 away); Referee: David Webb

2 March 2019 35	Aston Villa	4–0	Derby County	Aston
15:00 GMT	Hourihane 9', 44' (yellow card) 24'; Abraham 37'; Grealish 45+2'; Hause (yellow card) 60'	Report	Evans (yellow card) 23'; Holmes (yellow card) 72'	Stadium: Villa Park; Attendance: 37,273 (2,796 away); Referee: Lee Mason

10 March 2019 36	Birmingham City	0–1	Aston Villa	Birmingham
12:00 GMT	Kieftenbeld (yellow card) 5'; Jutkiewicz (yellow card) 45+1'; Davis (yellow card) 52'	Report	Hause (yellow card) 61'; Grealish 67' (yellow card) 68'; McGinn (yellow card) 90+2'	Stadium: St. Andrew's; Attendance: 26,631 (2,074 away); Referee: Tim Robinson

13 March 2019 37	Nottingham Forest	1–3	Aston Villa	West Bridgford
19:45 GMT	Colback 3' (yellow card) 86'; Ansarifard (yellow card) 29'; Milošević (yellow card) 61'	Report	McGinn 7', 15'; Hause 61' (yellow card) 28'; Taylor (yellow card) 65'; Kodjia (yellow card) 90+6'	Stadium: City Ground; Attendance: 29,224 (2,002 away); Referee: Mike Dean

16 March 2019 38	Aston Villa	3–0	Middlesbrough	Aston
15:00 GMT	El Ghazi 28'; McGinn 44'; Adomah 88'	Report	Obi Mikel (yellow card) 56'	Stadium: Villa Park; Attendance: 36,263 (1,850 away); Referee: Darren Bond

30 March 2019 39	Aston Villa	2–1	Blackburn Rovers	Aston
15:00 GMT	Abraham 8'; Mings 61'; McGinn (yellow card) 77'	Report	Bennett (yellow card) 26'; Bell 74'	Stadium: Villa Park; Attendance: 39,687 (1,123 away); Referee: Robert Jones

6 April 2019 40	Sheffield Wednesday	1–3	Aston Villa	Sheffield
15:00 BST	Hooper 7'; Fletcher (yellow card) 37' (penalty missed) 57'	Report	McGinn 22'; Whelan (yellow card) 38'; Mings (yellow card) 57'; Adomah 90+2' (yellow card) 90+4'; Abraham 90+3'	Stadium: Hillsborough; Attendance: 29,458 (4,440 away); Referee: Oliver Langford

10 April 2019 41	Rotherham United	1–2	Aston Villa	Rotherham
19.45 BST	Vaulks 36' (pen.) (yellow card) 75'; Ajayi (yellow card) 47'; Mattock (yellow card) 61'	Report	Abraham (penalty missed) 12' (yellow card) 90+2'; Mings (yellow card) 18' (yellow-red card) 34'; Kodjia 48' (pen.); Grealish 51'	Stadium: New York Stadium; Attendance: 10,558 (2,588 away); Referee: Andrew Madley

13 April 2019 42	Aston Villa	2–1	Bristol City	Aston
15:00 BST	McGinn (yellow card) 20'; Abraham 55' (pen.); Hourihane 66'	Report	Pack (yellow card) 19'; Taylor (yellow card) 21'; Hunt (yellow card) 44'; Weimann (yellow card) 54'; O'Leary (yellow card) 55'; Diédhiou 74'; Webster (yellow card) 87'	Stadium: Villa Park; Attendance: 41,418 (2,602 away); Referee: Scott Duncan

19 April 2019 43	Bolton Wanderers	0–2	Aston Villa	Horwich
15:00 BST	Beevers (yellow card) 64'; Connolly (yellow card) 79'	Report	Elmohamady (yellow card) 17'; Grealish 47'; Abraham 57'	Stadium: University of Bolton Stadium; Attendance: 17,344 (4,569 away); Referee: John Brooks

22 April 2019 44	Aston Villa	1–0	Millwall	Aston
13:00 BST	Kodjia 30'; Taylor (yellow card) 81'; Davis (yellow card) 85'	Report	Cooper (yellow card) 27'; O'Brien (yellow card) 90+3'	Stadium: Villa Park; Attendance: 39,839 (1,400 away); Referee: Tim Robinson

28 April 2019 45	Leeds United	1–1	Aston Villa	Leeds
12:00 BST	Hernández (yellow card) 14'; Cooper (yellow card) 21'; Klich (yellow card) 63' (goal) 72'; Bamford (yellow card) 75'	Report	El Ghazi (red card) 75'; Hourihane (yellow card) 75'; Adomah 77'; McGinn (yellow card) 80'	Stadium: Elland Road; Attendance: 36,786 (2,626 away); Referee: Stuart Attwell

5 May 2019 46	Aston Villa	1–2	Norwich City	Aston
12:30 BST	Kodjia 14'; Lansbury (yellow card) 62'	Report	Pukki 7'; Buendía (yellow card) 29'; Zimmermann (yellow card) 60'; Lewis (yellow card) 78'; Vrančić 86'	Stadium: Villa Park; Attendance: 41,696 (2,600 away); Referee: Peter Bankes

==== Playoffs ====
On 22 April 2019, Aston Villa confirmed their place in this year's EFL Championship playoffs. On 30 April 2019, Aston Villa confirmed 5th place in this year's Championship and would therefore play their first leg at home. The date is set for Saturday 11 May 2019 at 12:30pm.

11 May 2019 Semi Final - First Leg	Aston Villa	2–1	West Bromwich Albion	Villa Park, Birmingham
12:30 BST	Hourihane 75'; Abraham 79' (pen.)	Report	Gayle 16' (yellow card) 62' (yellow-red card) 88'; Holgate (yellow card) 33'; Hegazi (yellow card) 48'; Gibbs (yellow card) 77'	Attendance: 40,754; Referee: Graham Scott

14 May 2019 Semi-final second leg	West Bromwich Albion	1–0 (a.e.t.) (2–2 agg.) (3–4 p)	Aston Villa	West Bromwich
20:00 BST	Dawson 29'; Johansen (yellow card) 58'; Brunt (yellow card) 66' (yellow-red card) 80'; Morrison (yellow card) 97'	Report	Mings (yellow card) 16'; Taylor (yellow card) 74'	Stadium: The Hawthorns; Attendance: 25,702; Referee: Chris Kavanagh
	Penalties
	Holgate (penalty missed); Hegazi (penalty missed); Adarabioyo (penalty scored); Gibbs (penalty scored); Morrison (penalty scored)		Hourihane (penalty scored); Jedinak (penalty scored); Grealish (penalty scored); Adomah (penalty missed); Abraham (penalty scored)

27 May 2019 Final	Aston Villa	2–1	Derby County	Wembley Stadium, London
15:00 BST	El Ghazi (yellow card) 28' (goal) 44'; Hourihane (yellow card) 48'; McGinn 59'	Report	Bennett (yellow card) 47'; Tomori (yellow card) 51'; Marriott 81'; Wilson (yellow card) 90+2'	Attendance: 85,826; Referee: Paul Tierney

=== FA Cup ===
The third round draw was made live on BBC by Ruud Gullit and Paul Ince from Stamford Bridge on 3 December 2018.

5 January 2019 Third round	Aston Villa	0–3	Swansea City	Aston
15:00 GMT	Lansbury (yellow card) 71'; Taylor (yellow card) 87'	Report	Baker-Richardson 2'; Dyer 47'; Fulton 78'; Fer (yellow card) 90+3'	Stadium: Villa Park; Attendance: 30,572; Referee: Gavin Ward

=== EFL Cup ===
On 15 June 2018, the draw for the first round was made in Vietnam. The second round was drawn by Chris Waddle and Mick McCarthy on 16 August 2018.

14 August 2018 First round	Yeovil Town	0–1	Aston Villa	Yeovil
19:45 BST	Fisher (penalty missed) 60'; Warren (yellow card) 63'; D'Almeida (yellow card) 65'	Report	Hourihane (yellow card) 24'; Doyle-Hayes (yellow card) 44'; Elphick (yellow card) 59'; Kodjia (yellow card) 63'; Hourihane 77'	Stadium: Huish Park; Attendance: 6,123; Referee: John Brooks

28 August 2018 Second round	Burton Albion	1–0	Aston Villa	Burton on Trent
19:45 BST	Boyce 52'; McFadzean (yellow card) 45+2' (yellow-red card) 89'	Report	Hourihane (yellow card) 30'; De Laet (yellow card) 69'; Adomah (penalty missed) 89'	Stadium: Pirelli Stadium; Attendance: 3,411; Referee: Darren Bond

== Transfers ==
=== Transfers in ===
Date from	Position	Nationality	Name	From	Fee	Ref.
30 June 2018	GK	(Finland)	Viljami Sinisalo	(Finland) FC Espoo	Undisclosed	
13 July 2018	LW	(Republic of Ireland)	Tyreik Wright	(Republic of Ireland) Lakewood Athletic	Undisclosed	
7 August 2018	GK	(Norway)	Ørjan Nyland	(Germany) Ingolstadt 04	Undisclosed	
8 August 2018	CM	(Scotland)	John McGinn	(Scotland) Hibernian	£2,500,000	
29 September 2018	GK	(Hungary)	Ákos Onódi	(Hungary) Győri ETO FC	Undisclosed	
1 January 2019	GK	(Croatia)	Lovre Kalinić	(Belgium) K.A.A. Gent	Undisclosed	
29 January 2019	WG	(England)	Jaden Philogene	Pro:Direct Academy	—N/a	
31 January 2019	RB	(France)	Frédéric Guilbert	(France) SM Caen	Undisclosed	

=== Transfers out ===
Date from	Position	Nationality	Name	To	Fee	Ref.
1 July 2018	CF	(England)	Gabriel Agbonlahor	Free agent	Released	
1 July 2018	LB	(France)	Jordan Amavi	(France) Marseille	£9,000,000	
1 July 2018	CB	(Republic of Ireland)	James Finnerty	(England) Rochdale	Free transfer	
1 July 2018	RM	(Spain)	Carles Gil	(Spain) RC Deportivo	Undisclosed	
1 July 2018	GK	(Italy)	Pierluigi Gollini	(Italy) Atalanta	£3,750,000	
1 July 2018	GK	(England)	Emmanuel Idem	(England) Macclesfield Town	Released	
1 July 2018	CB	(Republic of the Congo)	Christopher Samba	Free agent	Released	
1 July 2018	CB	(England)	John Terry	Free agent	Mutual consent	
3 August 2018	GK	(Sweden)	Viktor Johansson	(England) Leicester City	Free transfer	
31 January 2019	CB	(England)	Jacob Bedeau	(England) Scunthorpe United	Free transfer	
18 March 2019	MF	(Australia)	Jordan Lyden	Free agent	Released	
3 May 2019	LB	(Wales)	Mitch Clark	Free agent	Released	

=== Loans in ===
Start date	Position	Nationality	Name	From	End date	Ref.
26 July 2018	GK	(Portugal)	André Moreira	(Spain) Atlético Madrid	23 January 2019	
6 August 2018	CB	(England)	Axel Tuanzebe	(England) Manchester United	31 May 2019	
22 August 2018	FW	(Netherlands)	Anwar El Ghazi	(France) Lille	31 May 2019	
25 August 2018	MF	(Democratic Republic of the Congo)	Yannick Bolasie	(England) Everton	21 January 2019	
31 August 2018	FW	(England)	Tammy Abraham	(England) Chelsea	31 May 2019	
7 January 2019	CB	(England)	Kortney Hause	(England) Wolverhampton Wanderers	31 May 2019	
31 January 2019	CM	(England)	Tom Carroll	(Wales) Swansea City	4 April 2019	
31 January 2019	CB	(England)	Tyrone Mings	(England) Bournemouth	31 May 2019	

=== Loans out ===
Start date	Position	Nationality	Name	To	End date	Ref.
9 August 2018	MF	(England)	Gary Gardner	(England) Birmingham City	31 May 2019	
10 August 2018	GK	(England)	Jed Steer	(England) Charlton Athletic	31 December 2018	
16 August 2018	DF	(Wales)	Mitchell Clark	(England) Port Vale	31 May 2019	
17 August 2018	DF	(England)	Easah Suliman	(Netherlands) FC Emmen	28 December 2018	
29 August 2018	MF	(Democratic Republic of the Congo)	Aaron Tshibola	(Scotland) Kilmarnock	31 May 2019	
29 August 2018	MF	(England)	Andre Green	(England) Portsmouth	17 January 2019	
31 August 2018	DF	(England)	Tommy Elphick	(England) Hull City	29 December 2018	
31 August 2018	MF	(Australia)	Jordan Lyden	(England) Oldham Athletic	7 January 2019	
31 August 2018	FW	(England)	Kelsey Mooney	(England) Cheltenham Town	January 2019	
14 September 2018	DF	(Belgium)	Ritchie De Laet	(Australia) Melbourne City	31 May 2019	
19 September 2018	FW	(Scotland)	Ross McCormack	(Australia) Central Coast Mariners	5 January 2019	
5 January 2019	SS	(Scotland)	Ross McCormack	(Scotland) Motherwell	31 May 2019	
11 January 2019	CF	(England)	Rushian Hepburn-Murphy	(England) Cambridge United	31 May 2019	
29 January 2019	CM	(England)	Callum O'Hare	(England) Carlisle United	31 May 2019	
31 January 2019	CM	(England)	Corey Blackett-Taylor	(England) Walsall	31 May 2019	
31 January 2019	RB	(England)	James Bree	(England) Ipswich Town	31 May 2019	
31 January 2019	CM	(Republic of Ireland)	Jake Doyle-Hayes	(England) Cambridge United	31 May 2019	
31 January 2019	CF	(Republic of Ireland)	Scott Hogan	(England) Sheffield United	31 May 2019	
31 January 2019	CF	(England)	Harry McKirdy	(Wales) Newport County	31 May 2019	
31 January 2019	RB	(France)	Frederic Guilbert	(France) SM Caen	31 May 2019	
16 March 2019	CM	(England)	Alexander Prosser	(England) Brackley Town	31 May 2019	

== Squad statistics ==
=== Appearances and goals ===
No.	Pos	Nat	Player	Total		Championship		Play-offs		FA Cup		League Cup	
No.	Pos	Nat	Player	Apps	Goals	Apps	Goals	Apps	Goals	Apps	Goals	Apps	Goals
Goalkeepers
1	GK	(Norway) NOR	Ørjan Nyland	23	0	23	0	0	0	0	0	0	0
12	GK	(England) ENG	Jed Steer	19	0	15+1	0	3	0	0	0	0	0
28	GK	(Croatia) CRO	Lovre Kalinić	8	0	7	0	0	0	1	0	0	0
31	GK	(England) ENG	Mark Bunn	1	0	1	0	0	0	0	0	0	0
33	GK	(Montenegro) MNE	Matija Sarkic	0	0	0	0	0	0	0	0	0	0
Defenders
3	DF	(Wales) WAL	Neil Taylor	37	0	28+3	0	3	0	1	0	2	0
4	DF	(England) ENG	Axel Tuanzebe	30	0	24+1	0	3	0	0	0	2	0
5	DF	(Wales) WAL	James Chester (team captain)	28	5	28	5	0	0	0	0	0	0
21	DF	(Scotland) SCO	Alan Hutton	34	2	33	2	0	0	1	0	0	0
24	DF	(England) ENG	Tommy Elphick	14	1	11	1	0	0	1	0	2	0
27	DF	(Egypt) EGY	Ahmed Elmohamady	42	2	32+6	2	3	0	0	0	0+1	0
30	DF	(England) ENG	Kortney Hause	12	1	10+1	1	0+1	0	0	0	0	0
39	DF	(England) ENG	Dominic Revan	0	0	0	0	0	0	0	0	0	0
40	DF	(England) ENG	Tyrone Mings	18	2	15	2	3	0	0	0	0	0
	DF	(England) ENG	Micah Richards	0	0	0	0	0	0	0	0	0	0
Midfielders
6	MF	(Republic of Ireland) IRL	Glenn Whelan	38	1	23+12	1	1	0	1	0	1	0
7	MF	(Scotland) SCO	John McGinn	44	7	39+1	6	3	1	1	0	0	0
8	MF	(England) ENG	Henri Lansbury	5	0	1+2	0	0	0	0+1	0	1	0
10	MF	(England) ENG	Jack Grealish	35	6	31	6	3	0	0	0	0+1	0
14	MF	(Republic of Ireland) IRL	Conor Hourihane	48	9	33+10	7	2+1	1	0	0	2	1
15	MF	(Australia) AUS	Mile Jedinak	18	0	12+5	0	0+1	0	0	0	0	0
19	MF	(England) ENG	Andre Green	22	1	8+10	1	1+2	0	0	0	1	0
20	MF	(Iceland) ISL	Birkir Bjarnason	17	2	11+6	2	0	0	0	0	0	0
37	MF	(Ghana) GHA	Albert Adomah	42	4	22+14	4	2+1	0	1	0	2	0
41	MF	(England) ENG	Jacob Ramsey	1	0	0+1	0	0	0	0	0	0	0
Forwards
17	FW	(England) ENG	Keinan Davis	7	0	0+5	0	0+1	0	0+1	0	0	0
18	FW	(England) ENG	Tammy Abraham	40	26	37	25	3	1	0	0	0	0
22	FW	(Netherlands) NED	Anwar El Ghazi	36	6	25+6	5	3	1	1	0	1	0
26	FW	(Ivory Coast) CIV	Jonathan Kodjia	42	9	19+19	9	0+2	0	0+1	0	0+1	0
Players transferred or loaned out during the season
2	DF	(Belgium) BEL	Ritchie De Laet	2	0	0	0	0	0	0	0	2	0
9	FW	(Republic of Ireland) IRL	Scott Hogan	7	0	0+6	0	0	0	1	0	0	0
11	MF	(Democratic Republic of the Congo) COD	Yannick Bolasie	21	2	9+12	2	0	0	0	0	0	0
11	MF	(England) ENG	Tom Carroll	2	0	0+2	0	0	0	0	0	0	0
16	DF	(England) ENG	James Bree	11	0	6+2	0	0	0	1	0	1+1	0
23	GK	(Portugal) POR	André Moreira	2	0	0	0	0	0	0	0	2	0
29	FW	(England) ENG	Rushian Hepburn-Murphy	7	0	0+5	0	0	0	0	0	2	0
34	MF	(Republic of Ireland) IRL	Jake Doyle-Hayes	1	0	0	0	0	0	0	0	1	0
36	FW	(England) ENG	Harry McKirdy	0	0	0	0	0	0	0	0	0	0
38	FW	(England) ENG	Callum O'Hare	1	0	0	0	0	0	1	0	0	0
	MF	(Australia) AUS	Jordan Lyden	0	0	0	0	0	0	0	0	0	0

=== Disciplinary record ===
Disciplinary Records
Player	Number	Position	Championship		EFL Cup		FA Cup		Other		Total	
Player	Number	Position	Y	R	Y	R	Y	R	Y	R	Y	R
(Scotland) John McGinn	7	MF	14	0	0	0	0	0	0	0	14	0
(Republic of Ireland) Conor Hourihane	14	MF	6	0	2	0	0	0	1	0	9	0
(Scotland) Alan Hutton	21	DF	8	0	0	0	0	0	0	0	8	0
(England) Tyrone Mings	40	DF	4	1	0	0	0	0	1	0	5	1
(Ivory Coast) Jonathan Kodjia	26	FW	5	0	1	0	0	0	0	0	6	0
(Wales) Neil Taylor	3	DF	4	0	0	0	1	0	1	0	6	0
(Netherlands) Anwar El Ghazi	22	FW	4	0^{a}	0	0	0	0	1	0	5	0
(Republic of Ireland) Glenn Whelan	6	MF	5	0	0	0	0	0	0	0	5	0
(England) Jack Grealish	10	MF	5	0	0	0	0	0	0	0	5	0
(England) Kortney Hause	30	DF	5	0	0	0	0	0	0	0	5	0
(Wales) James Chester	5	DF	2	1	0	0	0	0	0	0	2	1
(Ghana) Albert Adomah	37	MF	3	0	0	0	0	0	0	0	3	0
(Iceland) Birkir Bjarnason	20	MF	3	0	0	0	0	0	0	0	3	0
(England) Tammy Abraham	18	FW	3	0	0	0	0	0	0	0	3	0
(Democratic Republic of the Congo) Yannick Bolasie	11	MF	3	0	0	0	0	0	0	0	3	0
(England) Henri Lansbury	8	MF	1	0	0	0	1	0	0	0	2	0
(Egypt) Ahmed Elmohamady	27	DF	1	0	0	0	0	0	0	0	1	0
(Republic of Ireland) Jake Doyle-Hayes	34	MF	0	0	1	0	0	0	0	0	1	0
(England) Keinan Davis	17	ST	1	0	0	0	0	0	0	0	1	0
(Croatia) Lovre Kalinić	28	GK	1	0	0	0	0	0	0	0	1	0
(Australia) Mile Jedinak	15	MF	1	0	0	0	0	0	0	0	1	0
(Belgium) Ritchie De Laet	2	DF	0	0	1	0	0	0	0	0	1	0
(England) Tommy Elphick	24	DF	0	0	1	0	0	0	0	0	1	0
(England) Tom Carroll	11	MF	1	0	0	0	0	0	0	0	1	0
TOTAL			80	2	6	0	2	0	4	0	92	2

^a Given one Red Card, which was later rescinded.
Based on matches played until 28 May 2019

=== Top scorers ===
Top Scorers
No.	Pos.	Nat.	Player	Championship		EFL Cup		FA Cup		Other		Total	
No.	Pos.	Nat.	Player	Goals	Assists	Goals	Assists	Goals	Assists	Goals	Assists	Goals	Assists
18	FW	ENG	Tammy Abraham	25	3	0	0	0	0	1	0	26	3
14	MF	IRE	Conor Hourihane	7	11	1	0	0	0	1	0	9	11
26	FW	CIV	Jonathan Kodjia	9	2	0	1	0	0	0	0	9	3
7	MF	SCO	John McGinn	6	9	0	0	0	0	1	0	7	9
10	MF	ENG	Jack Grealish	6	6	0	0	0	0	0	1	6	7
22	FW	NED	Anwar El Ghazi	5	6	0	0	0	0	1	0	6	6
5	DF	WAL	James Chester	5	0	0	0	0	0	0	0	5	0
37	MF	GHA	Albert Adomah	4	3	0	0	0	0	0	0	4	3
27	DF	EGY	Ahmed Elmohamady	2	7	0	0	0	0	0	1	2	8
11	MF	DRC	Yannick Bolasie	2	5	0	0	0	0	0	0	2	5
21	DF	SCO	Alan Hutton	2	1	0	0	0	0	0	0	2	1
20	MF	ISL	Birkir Bjarnason	2	0	0	0	0	0	0	0	2	0
40	DF	ENG	Tyrone Mings	2	0	0	0	0	0	0	0	2	0
6	MF	IRE	Glenn Whelan	1	3	0	0	0	0	0	0	1	3
19	MF	ENG	Andre Green	1	1	0	0	0	0	0	0	1	1
30	DF	ENG	Kortney Hause	1	0	0	0	0	0	0	0	1	0
24	DF	ENG	Tommy Elphick	1	0	0	0	0	0	0	0	1	0
3	DF	WAL	Neil Taylor	0	3	0	0	0	0	0	0	0	3
4	DF	ENG	Axel Tuanzebe	0	1	0	0	0	0	0	0	0	1
TOTAL				79	56	1	1	0	0	4	2	84	59

Based on matches played until 28 May 2019
