= Tyrone Mings =

English footballer (born 1993)

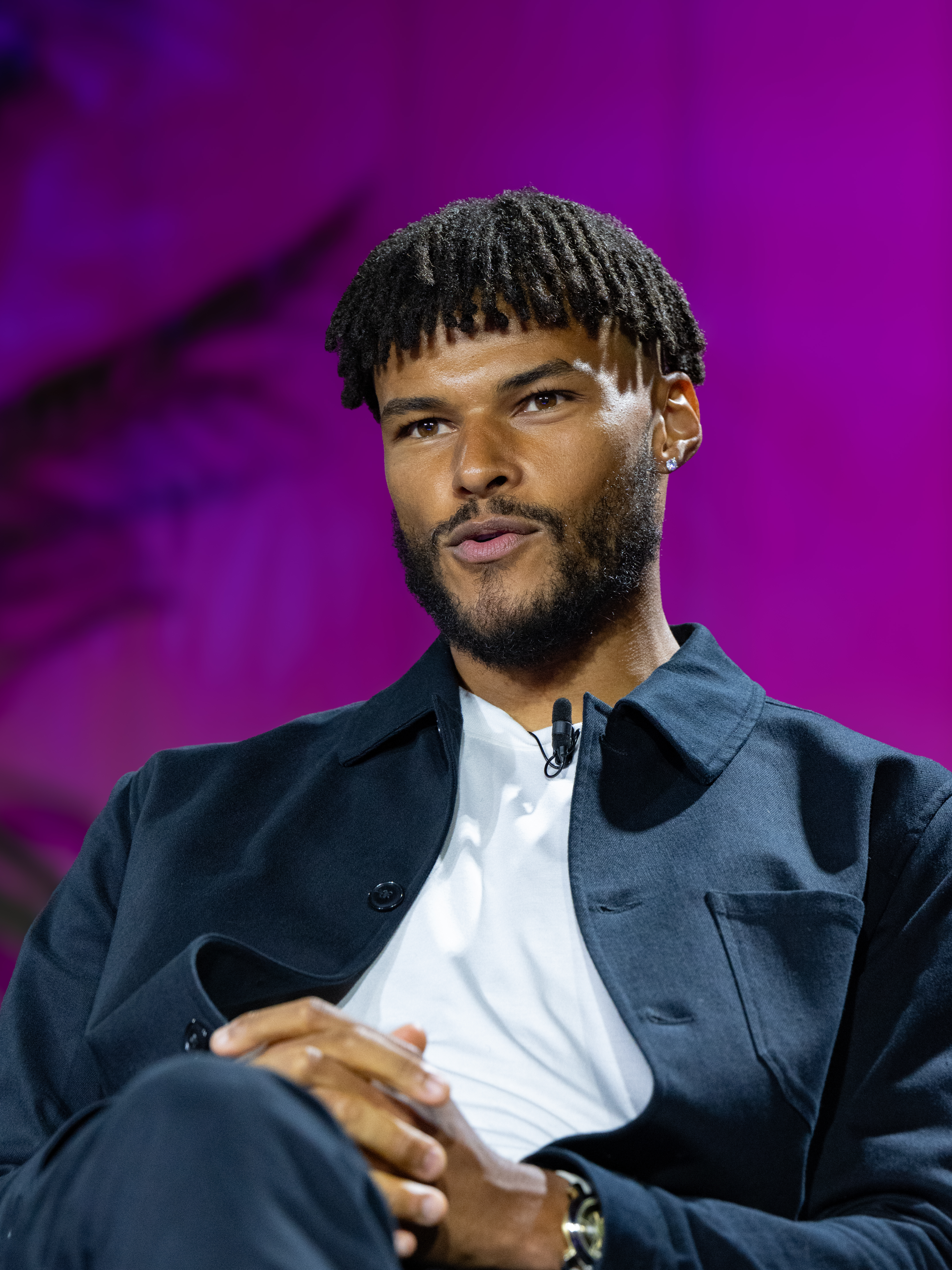
- Mings at SXSW London 2026

Personal information
- Full name: Tyrone Deon Mings
- Date of birth: 13 March 1993 (age 33)
- Place of birth: Bath, England
- Height: 6 ft 5 in (1.96 m)
- Position: Centre-back

Team information
- Current team: Aston Villa
- Number: 5

Youth career
- 2001–2009: Southampton

Senior career*
Years	Team	Apps	(Gls)
2010–2012	Yate Town	28	(2)
2012	Chippenham Town	10	(0)
2012–2015	Ipswich Town	57	(1)
2015–2019	Bournemouth	17	(0)
2019	→ Aston Villa (loan)	15	(2)
2019–	Aston Villa	178	(6)

International career
2019–2023	England	18	(2)
Medal record
Men's football
Representing England
UEFA European Championship
Runner-up	2020 Europe
- * Club domestic league appearances and goals as of 19:40, 17 October 2026 (UTC)

Tyrone Deon Mings (born 13 March 1993) is an English professional footballer who plays as a centre-back for Premier League club Aston Villa.

Mings started his career playing non-League football with Yate Town, having previously been at the Southampton academy for eight years. He joined Southern League Premier Division club Chippenham Town in 2012. Mings signed for Ipswich Town in December 2012 and made his Football League debut on the final day of the 2012–13 season. He spent a further two seasons with Ipswich, before joining Bournemouth in 2015, going on to make his Premier League debut in August 2015. He joined Aston Villa on loan for the remainder of the 2018–19 season in January 2019, helping the club win promotion to the Premier League through the Championship play-offs. Mings signed permanently for Aston Villa in July 2019.

Mings received his first call up to the senior England squad in August 2019. He made his senior debut in October 2019. In June 2021, Mings was selected for the England squad for the UEFA Euro 2020 tournament, starting the first two games.

== Club career ==
=== Early career ===
Mings was born in Bath, Somerset to former non-League striker Adie Mings. Mings joined Southampton in 2001 as an eight-year-old, but was released in 2009 when the youth budget was axed. After leaving Southampton, he attended Millfield school in Somerset for two years on a football scholarship. Having graduated, Mings went on trial with both Bristol Rovers U18 and Eastleigh but was not offered a contract with either club.

==== Yate Town ====
Mings then signed for Southern Football League Division One South & West club Yate Town in Gloucestershire in July 2010, and he played during the 10–1 victory against Melksham Town during the 2011–12 FA Cup qualifying rounds.

He scored two goals during his time at Yate Town. His first goal was scored during the 2010–11 season, and his second and final goal for Yate Town was scored during the 3–2 victory against Thatcham Town on 11 October 2011.

He also won the 2010–11 Gloucestershire Senior Cup with Yate Town.

==== Chippenham Town ====
In the summer of 2012, he considered quitting football before eventually signing for Southern League Premier Division club Chippenham Town, representing the town he grew up in. Mings combined his non-League career with jobs as a barman and a mortgage advisor.

He made his debut for Chippenham Town on 18 September 2012 during the 1–0 victory against Bashley.

=== Ipswich Town ===
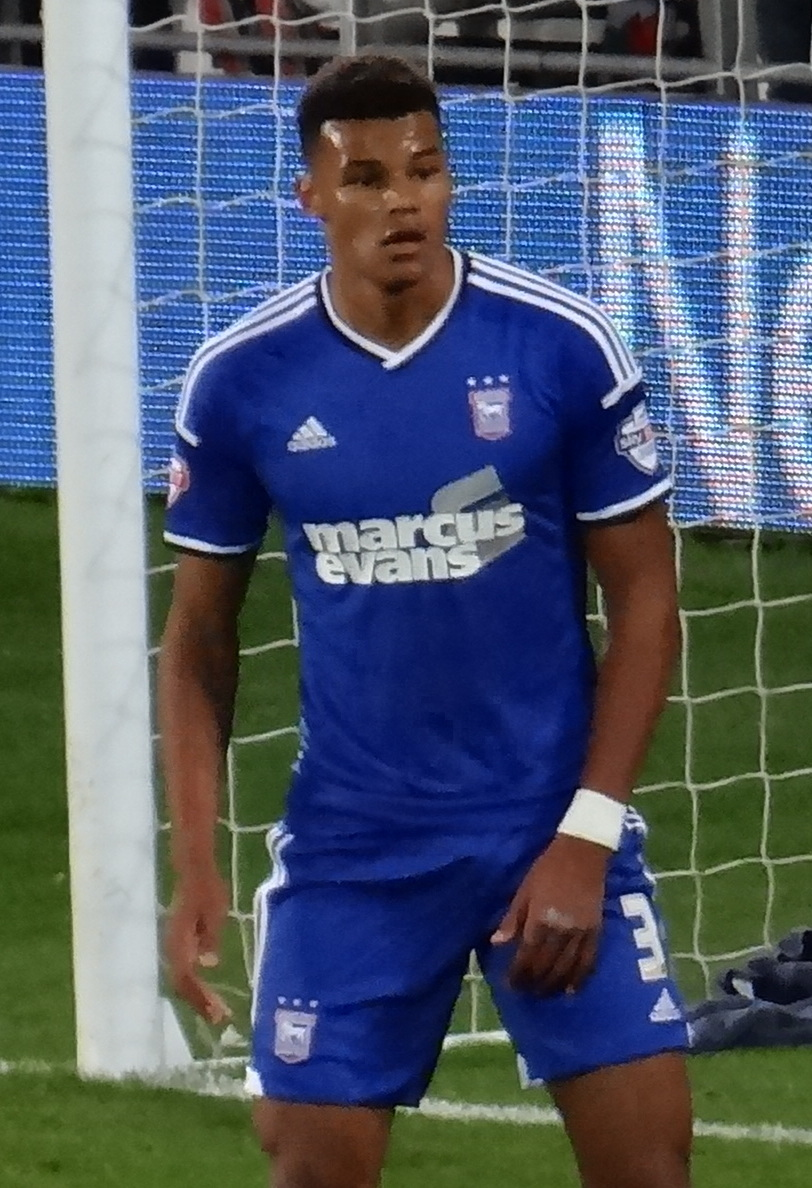
Mings playing for Ipswich Town in 2014

Mings signed for Ipswich Town in December 2012 after a short trial for a fee of £10,000 and an agreement for Ipswich to play a pre-season friendly game against Chippenham. On 4 May 2013, Mings made his debut for Ipswich on the last day of the 2012–13 season against Burnley. He went into the 2013–14 season as the back up left-back behind Aaron Cresswell, although he did start the opening game of the season due to Cresswell's suspension. On 4 January 2014, Mings started an FA Cup tie against Preston North End at right-back instead of his usual left-back role. He made 18 appearances during the season, making 6 starts and 12 substitute appearances.

Following Aaron Cresswell's transfer to West Ham United in July 2014, Mings was handed the number 3 shirt. Because of this, Mings offered to purchase new shirts for two fans who had bought shirts with his old number 15 printed on the back. On transfer deadline day in summer 2014, Mings was the subject of a £3 million bid from Crystal Palace which was rejected by Ipswich. On 20 September 2014, Mings signed a new three-year contract with Ipswich.

Mings started the 2014–15 season as the starting left-back, starting on the opening day of the season in a 2–1 win against Fulham. He continued to feature as a key part of the team throughout the season. On 10 October 2014, Mings won the Championship Player of the Month award for September. He scored his first goal for the club on 24 February 2015, netting the opening goal in a 4–2 home win over Birmingham City at Portman Road. Mings made 44 appearances in all competitions over the course of the season, scoring once, helping Ipswich to reach the Championship play-offs.

=== Bournemouth ===
On 26 June 2015, Mings signed for newly promoted Premier League club Bournemouth on a four-year contract for an undisclosed fee, reported to be £8 million.

Mings made his Premier League debut for Bournemouth on 29 August 2015 in a 1–1 draw with Leicester City. However, he suffered a knee injury six minutes after coming on as a half-time substitute. On 3 September 2015, it was confirmed that Mings' injury would mean that he would be sidelined for between 9 and 12 months. On 13 December 2016, he made his comeback after 15 months as a late substitute in a 1–0 home win over defending champions Leicester City, the same opponent when he got injured in his debut.

On 8 March 2017, Mings was banned by the FA for five matches following an alleged stamp on Zlatan Ibrahimović in a 1–1 draw against Manchester United on the previous weekend.

=== Aston Villa ===
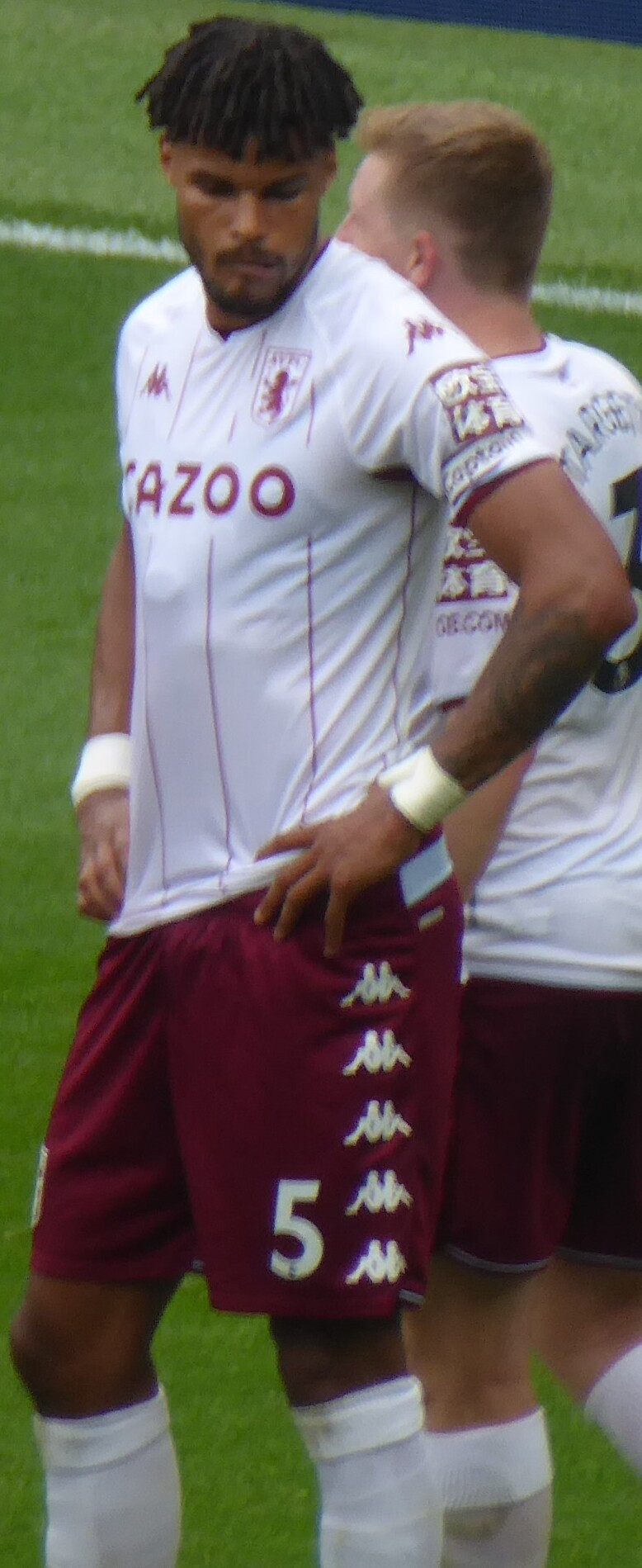
Mings playing for Aston Villa in 2021

==== Initial loan ====
On 31 January 2019, 25-year-old Mings joined Aston Villa on loan for the rest of the season. He made his Villa debut on 2 February against Reading. The match was the subject of controversy following an incident where Mings stepped on the face of Reading forward Nélson Oliveira after a tussle for the ball. Oliveira was forced off with deep gashes to his forehead and nose. Mings later apologised, insisting that it was not intentional. As referee Geoff Eltringham had seen the incident and determined that it was accidental, no retrospective action was taken.

Mings scored his first Villa goal in his second game, on 8 February 2019. He scored in the 82nd minute of the home game against Sheffield United. At that point, Aston Villa had been losing 3–0, but they went on to complete a late comeback to draw the game 3–3. Despite Villa's poor run of form at that time, Mings was a standout performer and quickly became a fan favourite despite only recently arriving from Bournemouth. Villa had a change in form after the return of Jack Grealish from injury, during which Villa picked up a ten-game winning streak, in the fifth of which Mings scored the winning goal in a 2–1 win over Blackburn Rovers. On 27 May 2019, Mings played in the 2019 Championship play-off final, where he helped Villa beat Derby County 2–1, and gain promotion to the Premier League.

==== Premier League ====
Mings signed for Aston Villa permanently on 8 July 2019. The fee was believed to be an initial £20million, with add-ons that could bring the total to £25million.

After the UK government announced resumption of sports and Premier League announced the return of teams as part of "Project Restart" from 17 June, Mings claimed that the players were the last to be consulted and were only treated as "commodities in the game".

On 21 September 2020, Mings signed a new four-year contract with Aston Villa. Following the departure of former captain Jack Grealish, Mings was announced as the new captain of Aston Villa on 14 August 2021, having served as interim captain during Grealish's injury in the second half of the 2020–21 season.

On 27 July 2022, it was announced that Aston Villa manager Steven Gerrard had made the decision to remove the captaincy from Mings for the upcoming season, instead naming John McGinn as the new captain. Gerrard stated that the decision would allow Mings to focus on his own game without the added pressure of being captain, whereas Mings commented that he had no issues with the choice and only wanted what was best for Aston Villa.

On 12 August 2023, the opening day of the 2023–24 season away at Newcastle United, Mings suffered a significant knee injury, that required him to be carried off the pitch on a stretcher.

On 5 October 2024, after 420 days on the sidelines, Mings returned to football as a permitted overage player for Aston Villa U21s against Newcastle in the Premier League 2, playing the first 45 minutes. Mings returned to the first team on 30 October, in a EFL Cup defeat to Crystal Palace.

Mings conceded a penalty on his Champions League debut on 6 November when, following a short goal kick, he erroneously picked up the ball in his own penalty area during a 1–0 loss to Club Brugge. His manager Unai Emery described it as 'the biggest mistake I witnessed in my career'.

On 4 June 2025, Mings signed a contract extension to keep him at the club until 2027.

On 1 November 2025, just minutes after coming off the bench in a 2–0 defeat to Liverpool, Mings injured his hamstring, which ruled him out for two months. Mings was removed from Aston Villa's UEFA Europa League squad and replaced by Ross Barkley in his absence. Also in November, manager Unai Emery announced that Mings was back in the Aston Villa captaincy picture, acting as one of the first choice backups behind captain John McGinn and vice captain Ezri Konsa.

On 20 May 2026, Mings played in the 2026 UEFA Europa League final, which Aston Villa won 3–0.

== International career ==
As well as being eligible for England, Mings was also eligible for Barbados through his paternal grandparents. His father Adie turned down a call-up from Barbados during his own playing career. 26-year-old Mings received his first England call-up in August 2019 when he was announced as part of the squad for the UEFA Euro 2020 qualifiers against Bulgaria and Kosovo. Mings earned his first senior England cap, in a 0–6 win away to Bulgaria, in October 2019, playing the entire match. The match was overshadowed by racist chants from Bulgarian fans, which was reported by Mings to captain Harry Kane who then reported it to the referee. This activated standard UEFA protocol, which largely put a stop to the chanting.

In June 2021, Mings was selected for the England squad for the UEFA Euro 2020 tournament. He started the opening group match of the tournament, helping England keep a clean sheet in a 1–0 win against Croatia on 13 June at Wembley. He also started the following match against Scotland on 18 June, again helping England keep a clean sheet in a 0–0 draw. He came on as a second-half substitute in the final group match in a 1–0 win against the Czech Republic on 22 June, as England finished top of Group D, qualifying for the knockout stages as a result.

Following England's defeat on penalties in the final to Italy, three England players Marcus Rashford, Jadon Sancho, and Bukayo Saka suffered online racist abuse after they had missed in the shootout. Home Secretary Priti Patel tweeted that she was "disgusted" by it. Mings then replied to her on Twitter accusing her of encouraging the racist behaviour of supporters after she had previously denounced the players' anti-racism message of taking the knee before kick-off as "gesture politics", and that supporters had a right to boo it. Mings' full tweet read: "You don't get to stoke the fire at the beginning of the tournament by labelling our anti-racism message as 'Gesture Politics' & then pretend to be disgusted when the very thing we're campaigning against, happens."

On 15 November 2021, Mings scored his first international goal, in a 10–0 away victory over San Marino in 2022 FIFA World Cup qualification.

== Personal life ==
In 2013, Ipswich Town's Supporters' Club praised Mings for his charity work. He spent Christmas Day 2013 feeding homeless people and when he was given the number three shirt by Ipswich at the beginning of the 2014–15 season, he replaced the shirts of fans who had already bought ones with his old number on the back. In 2019, Mings started his own youth footballing academy called The Tyrone Mings Academy that is based in Bristol, England. It is aimed at children aged 6 to 16.

Outside of football, Mings has a business interest in an interior design company in Bournemouth.

He studied for a Diploma in Global Business Football Management at the Professional Footballers' Association business school.

== Career statistics ==
=== Club ===
As of match played 28 October 2026

Appearances and goals by club, season and competition
Club	Season	League			FA Cup		League Cup		Europe		Other		Total	
Club	Season	Division	Apps	Goals	Apps	Goals	Apps	Goals	Apps	Goals	Apps	Goals	Apps	Goals
Yate Town	2010–11	Southern Football League Division One South & West	18	1	0	0	—		—		2 (Note: One appearance in FA Trophy, one appearance in Southern Football League Cup)	0	20	1
Yate Town	2011–12	Southern Football League Division One South & West	10	1	1	0	—		—		1 (Note: One appearance in FA Trophy)	0	12	1
Chippenham Town	2012–13	Southern League Premier Division	10	0	0	0	—		—		3 (Note: Two appearances in FA Trophy, one appearance in Southern Football League Cup)	0	13	0
Ipswich Town	2012–13	Championship	1	0	0	0	—		—		—		1	0
Ipswich Town	2013–14	Championship	16	0	2	0	0	0	—		—		18	0
Ipswich Town	2014–15	Championship	40	1	2	0	0	0	—		2 (Note: Appearances in Championship play-offs)	0	44	1
Ipswich Town	Total		95	3	5	0	0	0	—		8	0	108	3
Bournemouth	2015–16	Premier League	1	0	0	0	1	0	—		—		2	0
Bournemouth	2016–17	Premier League	7	0	1	0	1	0	—		—		9	0
Bournemouth	2017–18	Premier League	4	0	0	0	1	0	—		—		5	0
Bournemouth	2018–19	Premier League	5	0	0	0	2	0	—		—		7	0
Bournemouth	Total		17	0	1	0	5	0	—		0	0	23	0
Aston Villa (loan)	2018–19	Championship	15	2	—		—		—		3	0	18	2
Aston Villa	2019–20	Premier League	33	2	0	0	3	0	—		—		36	2
Aston Villa	2020–21	Premier League	36	2	0	0	1	0	—		—		37	2
Aston Villa	2021–22	Premier League	36	1	1	0	0	0	—		—		37	1
Aston Villa	2022–23	Premier League	35	1	0	0	2	0	—		—		37	1
Aston Villa	2023–24	Premier League	1	0	0	0	0	0	0	0	—		1	0
Aston Villa	2024–25	Premier League	14	0	2	0	1	0	4 (Note: Appearances in UEFA Champions League)	0	—		21	0
Aston Villa	2025–26	Premier League	17	0	0	0	0	0	5 (Note: Appearances in UEFA Europa League)	1	—		22	1
Aston Villa	2026–27	Premier League	6	0	0	0	2	0	1	0	1 (Note: Appearance in UEFA Super Cup)	0	10	0
Aston Villa	Aston Villa total		193	8	3	0	9	1	10	1	4	0	219	9
Career total			305	11	8	0	14	0	10	1	12	0	350	12

=== International ===
As of match played 16 June 2023

Appearances and goals by national team and year
National team	Year	Apps	Goals
England	2019	2	0
England	2020	5	0
England	2021	9	1
England	2022	1	1
England	2023	1	0
Total		18	2

As of match played 16 June 2023
England score listed first, score column indicates score after each Mings goal

List of international goals scored by Tyrone Mings
No.	Date	Venue	Cap	Opponent	Score	Result	Competition	Ref.
1	15 November 2021	Stadio Olimpico di San Marino, Serravalle, San Marino	16	San Marino	8–0	10–0	2022 FIFA World Cup qualification	
2	29 March 2022	Wembley Stadium, London, England	17	Ivory Coast	3–0	3–0	Friendly	

== Honours ==
Yate Town

- Gloucestershire Senior Cup: 2010–11

Aston Villa

- UEFA Europa League: 2025–26
- EFL Championship play-offs: 2019
- EFL Cup runner-up: 2019–20

England

- UEFA European Championship runner-up: 2020

Individual

- Football League Championship Player of the Month: September 2014
