= Ahmed Elmohamady =

Egyptian footballer (born 1987)

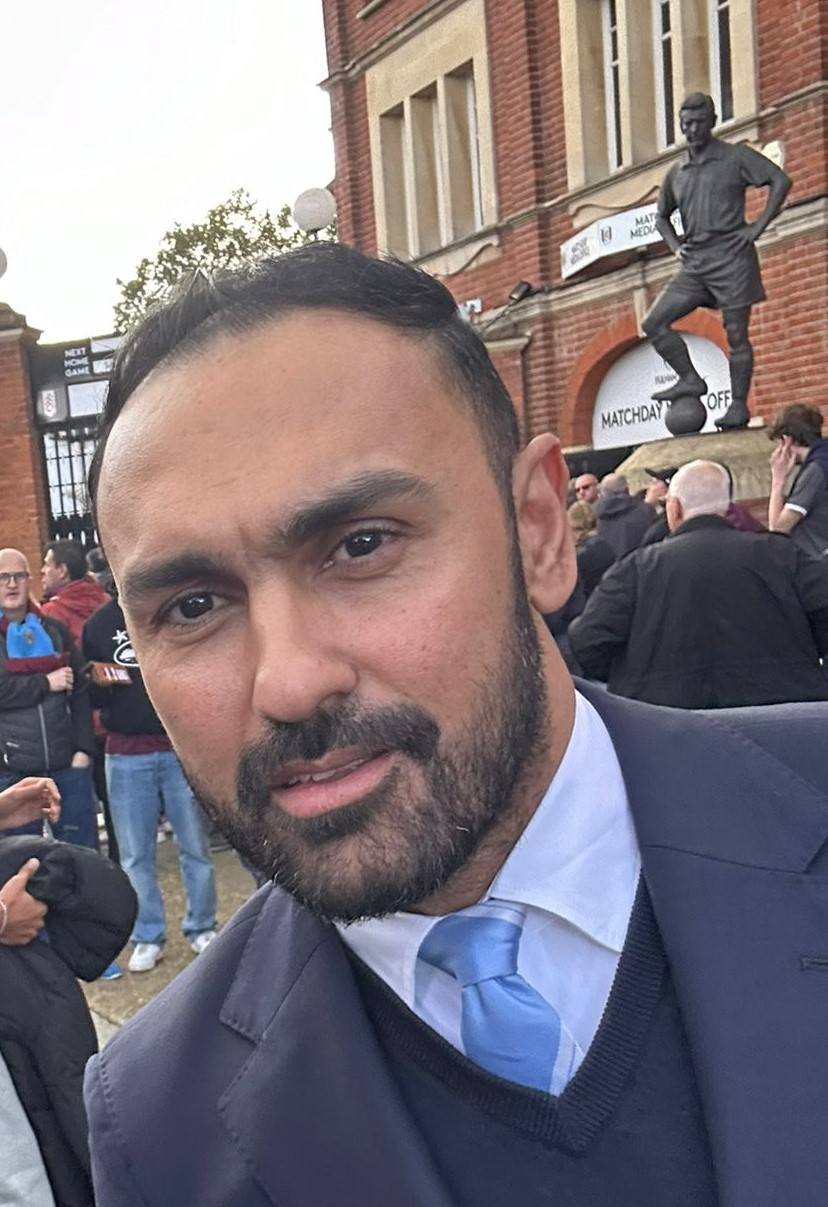
- Elmohamady in 2024

Personal information
- Full name: Ahmed Eissa Elmohamady Abdel Fattah
- Date of birth: 9 September 1987 (age 39)
- Place of birth: El Mahalla El Kubra, Egypt
- Height: 1.83 m (6 ft 0 in)
- Position: Right-back

Youth career
- 2003–2004: Ghazl El Mahalla

Senior career*
Years	Team	Apps	(Gls)
2004–2006	Ghazl El Mahalla	17	(4)
2006–2011	ENPPI	72	(12)
2010–2011	→ Sunderland (loan)	36	(0)
2011–2013	Sunderland	20	(1)
2012–2013	→ Hull City (loan)	41	(3)
2013–2017	Hull City	150	(7)
2017–2021	Aston Villa	113	(3)
Total		449	(30)

International career
2007–2019	Egypt	92	(6)
Medal record
Representing Egypt
African Cup of Nations
Winner	2008 Ghana
Winner	2010 Angola
Runner-up	2017 Gabon
- * Club domestic league appearances and goals

Ahmed Eissa Elmohamady Abdel Fattah (Arabic: أحمد المحمدي; born 9 September 1987) is an Egyptian former professional footballer who played as a right-back. He currently works for Aston Villa in the club's commercial department.

Elmohamady moved to Premier League club Sunderland in 2010, initially on loan from Egyptian side ENPPI. He went on to make over 240 league appearances for Sunderland and Hull City before joining Aston Villa during the Summer 2017 transfer window. He has won promotion to the Premier League from the Championship three times; twice with Hull City and once with Aston Villa.

He was selected by the Egyptian national team's manager, Hassan Shehata, for his first international appearance in 2007 and went on to win 92 caps. He was part of the Egyptian squads that won the 2008 and 2010 Africa Cup of Nations. He also captained the national team until 2019.

== Club career ==
=== ENPPI ===
Born in Basyoun, El Gharbia, Egypt, Elmohamady started his youth career at Ghazl El-Mahalla in 2003. He started to play for the first team in 2004 at the age of 17. Two years later, he joined ENPPI. Although he started his career as a striker with Ghazl El Mahalla, he played as a right-sided defender after joining ENPPI.

For a long time, Elmohamady attracted the attention of several European clubs. However, ENPPI was reluctant to allow him to move to any of them. In summer 2007, ENPPI turned down an offer from Hertha BSC, because the German side failed to meet the Egyptian club's financial demands. The player refused another bid from Rapid București of Romania in 2007.

On 25 November 2008, Elmohamady completed a five-day trial with Premier League side Blackburn Rovers following Rovers' manager Paul Ince's request. Rovers' new manager, Sam Allardyce, sent a senior official to Egypt to initiate talks with the Egyptian club in January 2009. However, the deal fell through as Allardyce believed it would be difficult for Elmohamady to make immediate impact.

=== Sunderland ===
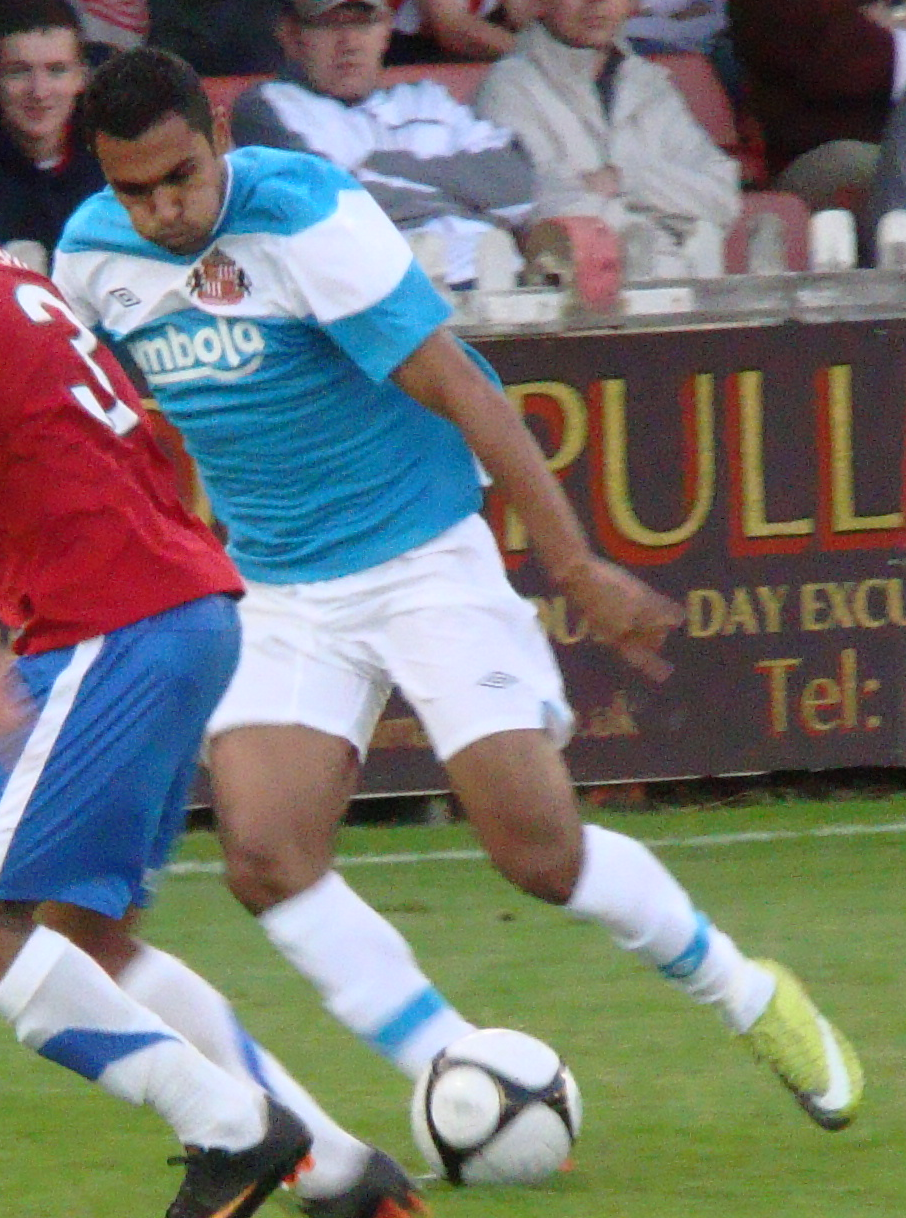
Elmohamady playing for Sunderland in 2011.

Elmohamady impressed Sunderland manager Steve Bruce while on trial with the Premier League side in August 2009. However, on 31 January 2010, Sunderland failed to sign him. Belgian side Club Brugge were also interested in the player and had, according to ENPPI, already made an offer. ENPPI accepted loan bids from both West Bromwich Albion and Sunderland for Elmohamady but while West Brom's offer was larger, Elmohamady chose to go to Sunderland, after being on trial. On 1 July 2010, Elmohamady joined Sunderland after passing medicals for a season-long loan move from ENPPI for a £500,000 fee, with an option of a permanent deal for £2 million next summer.

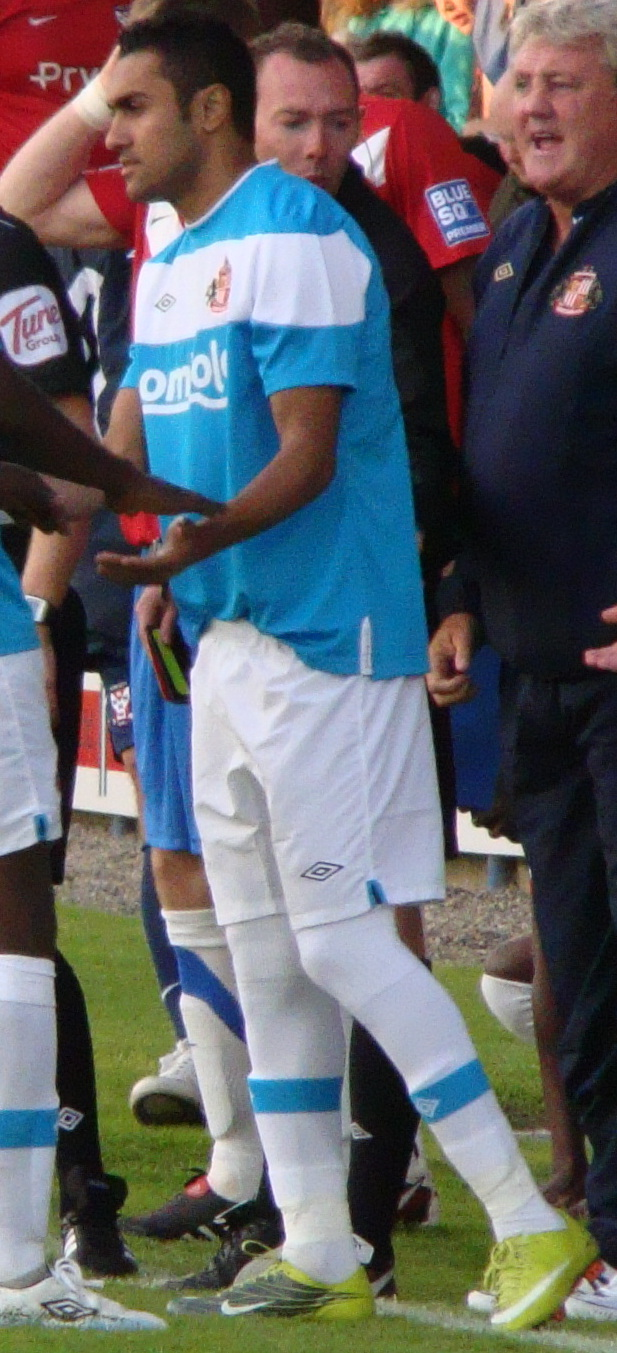
Elmohamady playing for Sunderland in 2011.

Elmohamady made his debut for Sunderland in their 2–2 draw with Birmingham City on 14 August 2010. He won Man of the Match for his performances against Arsenal and Manchester City. Due to his impressive start at Sunderland, manager Steve Bruce expressed an interest in signing Elmohamady permanently in the January transfer window.

On 11 March 2011, Sunderland announced that they had taken up the option of a £2 million transfer which was included in the loan agreement, making Elmohamady's contract a permanent one on Wearside. On 9 June 2011, the permanent contract was officially confirmed by Sunderland, with Elmohamady signing a deal which will keep him at the Stadium of Light until 2014. Manager Steve Bruce added, "Ahmed has done well in his first season with the club and has shown plenty of potential. We look forward to helping him grow as a player and I think there is much more to come from him."

Elmohamady started Sunderland's first league match of the 2011–12 season away to Liverpool, and provided the assist for Sebastian Larsson's debut goal as the Black Cats drew 1–1. He scored his first goal from a header for Sunderland in a 2–2 draw against West Bromwich Albion on 1 October 2011. Elmohamady fell out of favour following the departure of Bruce in December 2011 and made no starts under his replacement, Martin O'Neill. At the end of the 2011–12 season, Elmohamady had made 21 appearances in all competitions.

=== Hull City ===
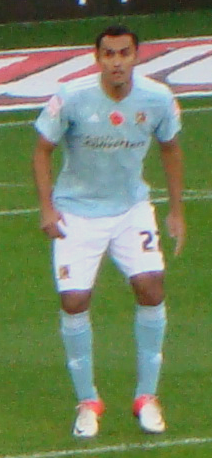
Elmohamady playing for Hull City in 2012

On 30 August 2012, Elmohamady moved to Hull City of the Championship on a season-long loan deal, favouring a move which would see him reunited with former Sunderland boss Steve Bruce. On 1 September, he made his debut for the club at the KC Stadium against Bolton Wanderers. On 18 September 2012 he scored his first goal for the club, scoring the first of his side's goals in a 3–2 victory against Leeds United at Elland Road. He also provided two assists during the derby at Elland Road.

On 16 January 2013, Sunderland decided to use the recall-clause. On 31 January 2013 he returned to Hull on loan for the remainder of the 2012–13 season. At the annual awards ceremony on 20 April 2013, at the KC Stadium, Elmohamady was voted as the Player of the Year.

After being on loan from Sunderland for the 2012–13 season on 28 June 2013, Elmohamady signed a three-year contract to become a permanent member of the Hull City squad. He made his debut on the first day of the 2013–14 season in a 2–0 loss away at Chelsea. On 21 September 2013, Elmohamady scored his first goal in the 2013–14 Premier League season against Newcastle United. On 17 May 2014, he played in the FA Cup Final, which Hull lost 3–2 against Arsenal.

On 10 January 2015, in a match away to West Bromwich Albion, Elmohamady touched the ball just before his goalkeeper Allan McGregor picked it up. His touch counted as a backpass, resulting in a free kick for the home team inside the penalty area, from which Saido Berahino scored the only goal of the match. On 23 June 2016, Elmohamady signed a 3-year extension to his contract at Hull City.

=== Aston Villa ===
On 19 July 2017, Elmohamady signed for Aston Villa for an undisclosed fee which would see him reunited with former Hull City boss Steve Bruce again. Elmohamady made his debut for Villa on the opening day of the 2017–18 season, a 1–1 home draw against former club Hull City. He scored his first goal for Aston Villa in the first game of the following season, on 6 August 2018, also against Hull City.

On 29 May 2019, Elmohamady played an instrumental part in Aston Villa's 2–1 victory over Derby County in the 2019 EFL Championship play-off final – providing the assist for Anwar El Ghazi's opening goal. Elmohamady scored his first Premier League goal since the 2014–15 season on 24 June 2020, a late equaliser away at Newcastle United.

On 28 May 2021, Aston Villa announced that Elmohamady would leave the club upon the expiration of his contract following the end of the 2020–21 season. In July 2022, Elmohamady returned to Aston Villa in a non-playing role as an ambassador during a pre-season tour in Australia.

== International career ==
Elmohamady played several times for Egypt U21s and was a participant in the 2007 African Youth Championship which was held in Republic of the Congo. He was the rising star of the Egyptian team and one of the stars of the tournament despite playing out of position as a forward.

He made his senior international debut in August 2007 at the age of 19 in a friendly against Ivory Coast in Paris. He was included in Egypt's final 2008 Africa Cup of Nations squad. The tournament was held in Ghana and Egypt went on to win the competition with Elmohamady featuring as a substitute. Since then, he has cemented his place in the starting lineup as a right-back or winger. He started all of Egypt's six matches in the second round of the 2010 FIFA World Cup Qualifiers.

In the 2009 Confederations Cup, he was sent off in Egypt's opening match against Brazil for deliberately handling Lúcio's goal-bound effort in the last minute. Brazil would go on to score the penalty and win 4–3.

== Post-playing career ==
Following his retirement from playing, Elmohamady returned to former club Aston Villa as a club ambassador. In September 2023, he was given a full-time role in the club's commercial department.

== Personal life ==
Elmohamady is married to Egyptian fashion designer Hiba Elawadi. He has a son and a daughter. They reside in Farnham. In England, Sunderland fans nicknamed him "Elmo". Elmohamady is a Muslim.

== Career statistics ==
Appearances and goals by club, season and competition
Club	Season	League			National Cup		League Cup		Europe		Other		Total	
Club	Season	Division	Apps	Goals	Apps	Goals	Apps	Goals	Apps	Goals	Apps	Goals	Apps	Goals
Ghazl El Mahalla	2004–05	Egyptian Premier League	14	4	??	??	—		—		—		14	4
Ghazl El Mahalla	2005–06	Egyptian Premier League	3	0	??	??	—		—		—		3	0
Ghazl El Mahalla	Total		17	4	??	??	—		—		—		17	4
ENPPI	2006–07	Egyptian Premier League	12	2	??	??	—		—		—		12	2
ENPPI	2007–08	Egyptian Premier League	6	1	??	??	—		—		—		6	1
ENPPI	2008–09	Egyptian Premier League	28	6	??	??	—		—		—		28	6
ENPPI	2009–10	Egyptian Premier League	26	3	??	??	—		—		—		26	3
ENPPI	Total		72	12	??	??	—		—		—		72	12
Sunderland	2010–11	Premier League	36	0	1	0	1	0	—		—		38	0
Sunderland	2011–12	Premier League	18	1	2	0	1	0	—		—		21	1
Sunderland	2012–13	Premier League	2	0	0	0	0	0	—		—		2	0
Sunderland	Total		56	1	3	0	2	0	—		—		61	1
Hull City	2012–13	Championship	41	3	0	0	0	0	—		—		41	3
Hull City	2013–14	Premier League	38	2	6	0	1	0	—		—		45	2
Hull City	2014–15	Premier League	38	2	1	0	0	0	4 (Note: Appearances in the Europa League)	1	—		43	3
Hull City	2015–16	Championship	41	3	3	0	4	0	—		3 (Note: Appearances in Championship play-offs)	0	51	3
Hull City	2016–17	Premier League	33	0	0	0	4	0	—		—		37	0
Hull City	Total		191	10	10	0	9	0	4	1	3	0	217	11
Aston Villa	2017–18	Championship	43	0	0	0	0	0	—		2	0	45	0
Aston Villa	2018–19	Championship	38	2	0	0	1	0	—		3	0	42	2
Aston Villa	2019–20	Premier League	18	1	1	0	6	1	—		—		25	2
Aston Villa	2020–21	Premier League	14	0	0	0	3	0	—		—		17	0
Aston Villa	Total		113	3	1	0	10	1	—		5	0	129	4
Career total			449	30	14	0	21	1	4	1	8	0	496	32

=== International ===
Appearances and goals by national team and year
National team	Year	Apps	Goals
Egypt	2007	5	0
Egypt	2008	14	0
Egypt	2009	12	0
Egypt	2010	12	1
Egypt	2011	3	0
Egypt	2012	13	1
Egypt	2013	6	0
Egypt	2014	5	0
Egypt	2015	1	0
Egypt	2016	1	0
Egypt	2017	8	0
Egypt	2018	7	1
Egypt	2019	5	3
Total		92	6

=== International goals ===
Egypt score listed first, score column indicates score after each Elmohamady goal.

International goals by date, venue, cap, opponent, score, result and competition
No.	Date	Venue	Cap	Opponent	Score	Result	Competition
1	20 January 2010	Ombaka National Stadium, Benguela, Angola	35	Benin	1–0	2–0	2010 Africa Cup of Nations
2	20 May 2012	Al-Merrikh Stadium, Omdurman, Sudan	52	Cameroon	1–0	2–1	Friendly
3	12 October 2018	Al Salam Stadium, Cairo, Egypt	85	eSwatini	1–0	4–1	2019 Africa Cup of Nations qualification
4	13 June 2019	Borg El Arab Stadium, Alexandria, Egypt	88	Tanzania	1–0	1–0	Friendly
5	26 June 2019	Cairo International Stadium, Cairo, Egypt	90	DR Congo	1–0	2–0	2019 Africa Cup of Nations
6	30 June 2019	Cairo International Stadium, Cairo, Egypt	91	Uganda	2–0	2–0	2019 Africa Cup of Nations

== Honours ==
Hull City

- Football League Championship runner-up: 2012–13
- FA Cup runner-up: 2013–14
- Football League Championship play-offs: 2016

Aston Villa

- EFL Championship play-offs: 2019
- EFL Cup runner-up: 2019–20

Egypt

- Africa Cup of Nations: 2008, 2010; runner-up: 2017

Individual

- CAF Team of the Year: 2010
- Hull City Player of the Year: 2012–13
