= Axel Tuanzebe =

Congolese footballer (born 1997)

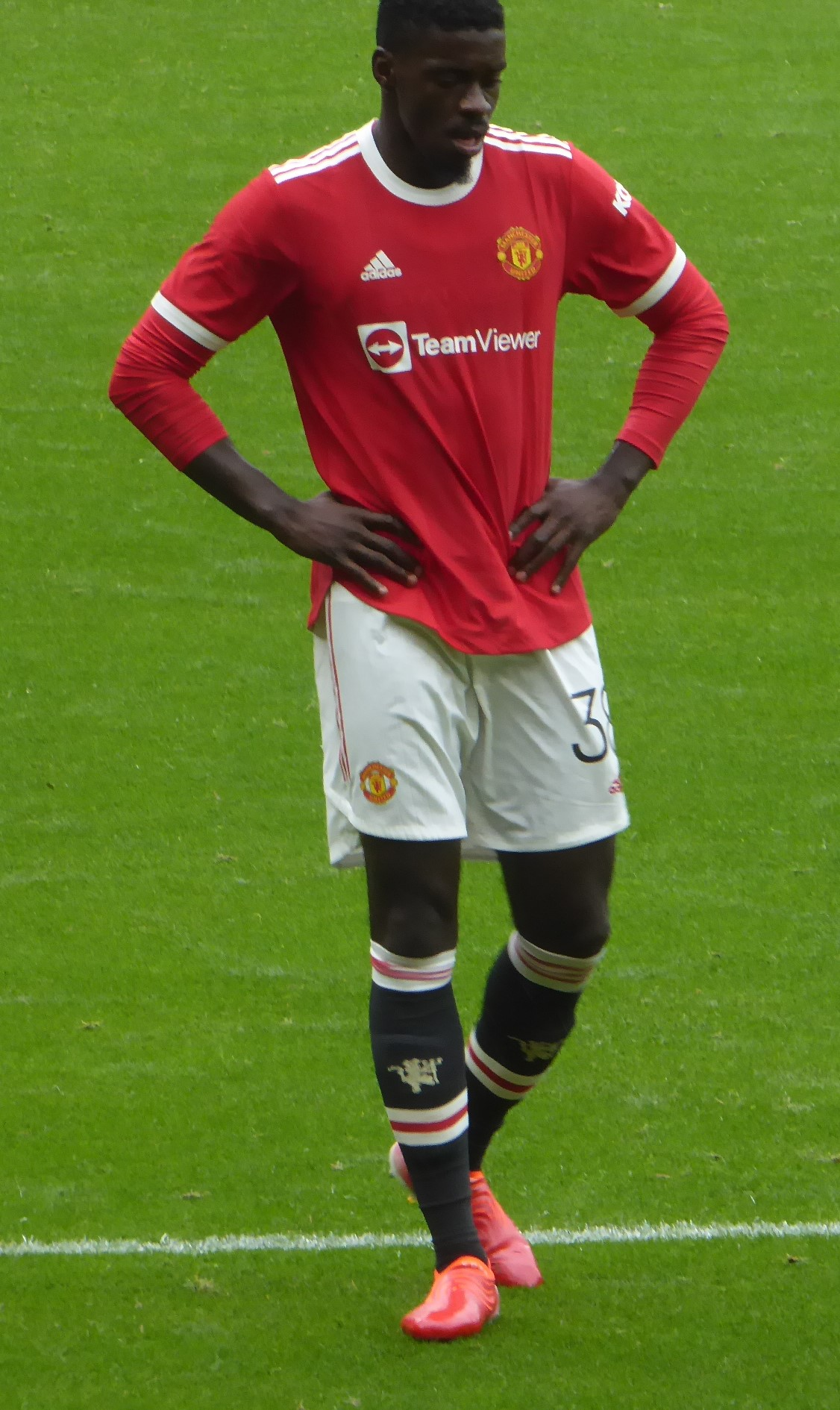
- Tuanzebe playing for Manchester United in 2021

Personal information
- Full name: Axel Tuanzebe
- Date of birth: 14 November 1997 (age 28)
- Place of birth: Bunia, DR Congo
- Height: 1.85 m (6 ft 1 in)
- Position: Defender

Team information
- Current team: Auxerre
- Number: 4

Youth career
- 2006–2015: Manchester United

Senior career*
Years	Team	Apps	(Gls)
2015–2023	Manchester United	19	(0)
2018	→ Aston Villa (loan)	5	(0)
2018–2019	→ Aston Villa (loan)	25	(0)
2021–2022	→ Aston Villa (loan)	9	(0)
2022	→ Napoli (loan)	1	(0)
2023	→ Stoke City (loan)	4	(0)
2023–2025	Ipswich Town	41	(0)
2025–2026	Burnley	14	(1)
2026–	Auxerre	2	(0)

International career^{‡}
2016	England U19	2	(0)
2016–2017	England U20	9	(0)
2017	England U21	1	(0)
2024–	DR Congo	19	(1)
- * Club domestic league appearances and goals as of 15:07, 20 September 2026 (UTC) ‡ National team caps and goals as of 20:13, 28 September 2026 (UTC)

Axel Tuanzebe (born 14 November 1997) is a Congolese professional footballer who plays as a defender for Ligue 1 club Auxerre and the DR Congo national team.

Tuanzebe is a graduate of the Manchester United youth system and won both the Jimmy Murphy Young Player of the Year and Denzil Haroun Reserve Team Player of the Year awards. He made his competitive debut in an FA Cup game against Wigan Athletic in January 2017. He had three spells on loan at Aston Villa and helped them to win promotion to the Premier League in 2019. After spending time on loan with Napoli in 2022 and Stoke City in 2023, he was released by Manchester United at the end of the 2022–23 season. Following two seasons at Ipswich Town, with whom he won promotion to the Premier League, he joined Burnley on a free transfer.

Born in the Democratic Republic of the Congo, Tuanzebe relocated to England at a young age and represented England at under-19, under-20 and under-21 levels, before making his debut for the senior DR Congo national team in 2024. He represented the DR Congo at the 2026 FIFA World Cup.

== Club career ==
=== Manchester United ===
==== Early years ====
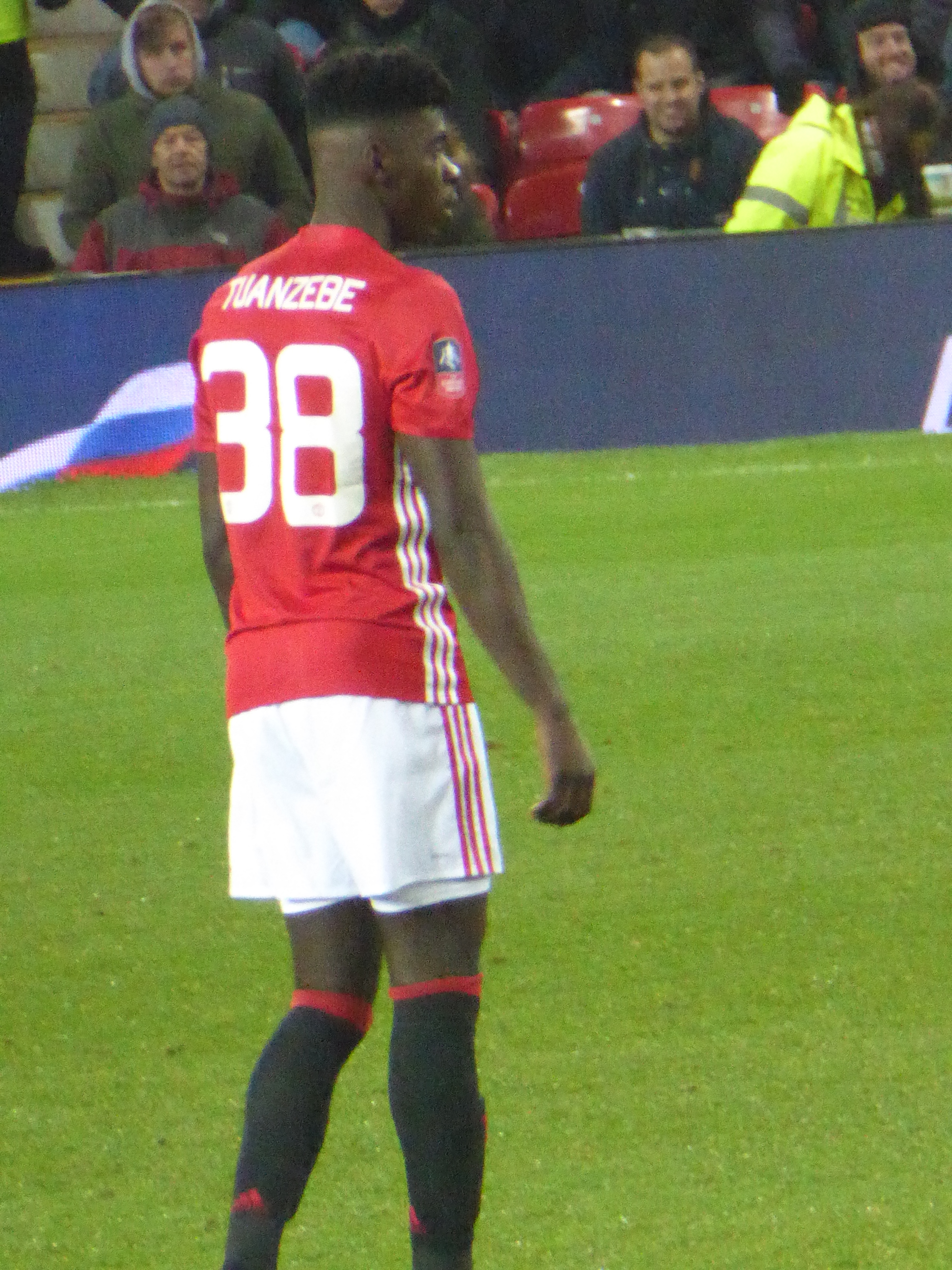
Tuanzebe playing for Manchester United in 2017

Tuanzebe was associated with the Manchester United academy from the age of eight. He was captain of the Milk Cup winning youth side in 2014. In May 2015, Tuanzebe won the Jimmy Murphy Young Player of the Year award. Academy coach Paul McGuinness noted that Tuanzebe was likely the first first-year scholar to captain the under-18 side since Gary Neville.

On 31 October 2015, at the age of 17, Tuanzebe was named on the substitutes bench for a match against Crystal Palace in the Premier League, the first time he had been a member of a first-team matchday squad.

==== 2016–17 season ====
On 29 January 2017, Tuanzebe made his Manchester United debut as a 68th-minute substitute, replacing Timothy Fosu-Mensah during a 4–0 FA Cup victory over Wigan Athletic at Old Trafford. Four days later, he extended his contract at Manchester United until 2020, with the option of a further year. On 7 May 2017, Tuanzebe started a senior match for the first time, in a 2–0 defeat against Arsenal in the Premier League. He won the Denzil Haroun Reserve Team Player of the Year award in May 2017.

==== 2017–18 season ====
Tuanzebe made his first start of the season against Swansea City in the EFL Cup on 24 October 2017, playing a key part in the second goal of the 2–0 victory. On 5 December 2017, he made his European debut in a 2–1 victory over CSKA Moscow in the UEFA Champions League.

==== Loans to Aston Villa ====
On 25 January 2018, Tuanzebe joined Championship side Aston Villa on loan for the remainder of the season. However, due to injury problems and the form of preferred centre-backs James Chester and John Terry he was only able to make five appearances before returning to Manchester United. In August 2018, after going on United's pre-season tour to the United States, he joined Aston Villa on loan again for the 2018–19 season. On 27 May 2019, he played the full 90 minutes as Villa achieved promotion to the Premier League in the 2019 EFL Championship play-off final with a victory over Derby County in the final.

==== 2019–20 season ====
In July 2019, Tuanzebe signed a new contract with Manchester United until June 2022, with an option for an additional year. At 21 years old, he became the youngest player to captain United since Norman Whiteside in 1985, during an EFL Cup victory against Rochdale in September 2019. Throughout the first two months of the 2019–20, Tuanzebe established himself as a starting centre back for Manchester United and was due to start the North West Derby in October but suffered a hip injury in the warm up. He made his return in December's EFL Cup victory over Colchester United, but suffered a hamstring injury during the game ruling him out for the remainder of the season.

==== 2020–21 season ====
On 20 October 2020, Tuanzebe started his first game in 10 months, after suffering an ankle injury in pre-season. The game was his UEFA Champions League debut in which Manchester United won 2–1 away against Paris Saint-Germain. Tuanzebe received praise for his match performance, especially his defensive work against Kylian Mbappé and Neymar. He started his first league game of the season on 27 January 2021, in a 2–1 home defeat to eventual bottom-finishers Sheffield United. On 25 February, he scored what would have been his only goal for Manchester United in the UEFA Europa League against Real Sociedad. However, VAR ruled the goal out due to teammate Victor Lindelöf fouling an opponent during the corner. Tuanzebe played all remaining Europa League games up until and including the final and was a rotation option in the Premier League making 19 appearances in total.

==== 2021–22 season: Aston Villa & Napoli loans ====
After a couple of displays for Manchester United in pre season friendlies, including a 4–2 away defeat at Queens Park Rangers, on 8 August 2021, Tuanzebe signed a new two-year contract with Manchester United, with the option of an extra year; that day, he also agreed to rejoin Aston Villa on loan for the 2021–22 season, his third loan spell with the club. On 8 January 2022, Tuanzebe was recalled from his Aston Villa loan, and loaned to Serie A team Napoli.

==== 2022–23 season: Stoke City loan ====
Tuanzebe suffered a further injury in the pre-season of 2022–23 season and did not return to training until January. On deadline day of the mid-season transfer window, he joined Stoke City on loan for the remainder of the season. However, continued injury problems restricted him to only five appearances.

=== Ipswich Town ===
On 8 September 2023, Tuanzebe signed for EFL Championship side Ipswich Town on an initial 12-month contract. He made his debut for the club in a 3–1 EFL Cup loss to Fulham on 1 November. Six days later, he made his league debut in a 2–2 draw with Rotherham United.

On 6 January 2024, Tuanzebe scored his first goal for Ipswich in a 3–1 win over Wimbledon in the third round of the FA Cup.

During the second half of the 2023–24 season, Tuanzebe established himself as Ipswich's starting right-back as the club gained promotion back to the Premier League after a 22-year absence.

On 3 June 2024, Ipswich announced they had extended his contract by 12 months. In October 2024 he suffered an unusual injury when he cut his thumb while washing dishes, requiring surgery to save it.

=== Burnley ===
On 26 June 2025, following Ipswich Town's relegation from Premier League, Tuanzebe joined newly promoted Premier League side Burnley on a free transfer. He scored his first Premier League goal in a 2–2 draw with Tottenham Hotspur on 24 January 2026.

=== Auxerre ===
On 1 September 2026, Tuanzebe joined Ligue 1 club Auxerre on a deal valid until 2028.

== International career ==
=== England ===
Tuanzebe was eligible to represent England or the Democratic Republic of the Congo at international level. He played youth international football for England at under-19, under-20 and under-21 levels.

Tuanzebe began his international career in June 2016, when he made his first appearance for England at under-19 level, against Mexico. He was a member of the England under-20 squad which won all three matches at the Four Nations tournament in October 2016. Tuanzebe was withdrawn from selection for the 2017 FIFA U-20 World Cup due to club commitments.

On 10 November 2017, Tuanzebe made his debut for England at under-21 level, against Ukraine.

=== DR Congo ===
In December 2023, Tuanzebe was pre-called up by the DR Congo national team for the 2023 Africa Cup of Nations.

Tuanzebe made his debut for the DR Congo national team on 6 June 2024 in a World Cup qualifier against Senegal at the Diamniadio Olympic Stadium. He played the full match as the game ended in a 1–1 draw.

In December 2025, Tuanzebe participated in the 2025 Africa Cup of Nations, held in Morocco. He started and played the full 90 minutes in the group-stage matches against Benin and Senegal. He also played through extra time in the round of 16 match against Algeria, but his team lost 0–1 and were eliminated.

On 31 March 2026, Tuanzebe scored his first senior international goal in a 1–0 extra-time win over Jamaica in the 2026 World Cup qualification inter-confederation play-offs, securing his nation's first World Cup appearance since 1974.

On 19 May 2026, he was included in the 26-man squad selected by head coach Sébastien Desabre to represent the DR Congo at the 2026 FIFA World Cup.

== Style of play ==
Tuanzebe's preferred position is at centre-back, but he can also play as a right-back, and has featured as a holding midfielder. His playing style has been compared to that of his former Manchester United teammate Eric Bailly and former Spain international Javi Martínez. Tuanzebe's performance on his first-team debut in a friendly against Wigan Athletic in July 2016 led manager José Mourinho to remark, "10 minutes is enough! The potential is there, you see it immediately."

== Personal life ==
Tuanzebe was born in Bunia, in the Democratic Republic of the Congo. He emigrated to England with his family in 2002. He attended St Cuthbert's RC High School in Rochdale and captained the Year 7 football team to the final of the English National Schools Cup at Stamford Bridge in 2009. In the same year, he was awarded Sports Boy of the Year by the Mayor of Rochdale. He also represented his school in cross-country and triple-jump. He is the younger brother of ex-Clitheroe striker Dimitri Tuanzebe.

In July 2018, Tuanzebe broke the Guinness World Record for the fastest time to individually clear a game of Hungry Hungry Hippos, while in Los Angeles on Manchester United's pre-season tour. The record has since been broken.

In July 2025, Tuanzebe sued Manchester United for alleged negligent medical advice. The claim related to a value of over £1 million, from a period between July 2022 and his loan to Stoke the following January.

== Career statistics ==
=== Club ===
As of match played 20 September 2026

Appearances and goals by club, season and competition
Club	Season	League			National cup (Note: Includes FA Cup, Coppa Italia)		League cup (Note: Includes EFL Cup)		Europe		Other		Total	
Club	Season	Division	Apps	Goals	Apps	Goals	Apps	Goals	Apps	Goals	Apps	Goals	Apps	Goals
Manchester United	2015–16	Premier League	0	0	0	0	0	0	0	0	—		0	0
Manchester United	2016–17	Premier League	4	0	1	0	0	0	0	0	0	0	5	0
Manchester United	2017–18	Premier League	1	0	0	0	1	0	1 (Note: Appearance in UEFA Champions League)	0	0	0	3	0
Manchester United	2018–19	Premier League	0	0	0	0	0	0	0	0	—		0	0
Manchester United	2019–20	Premier League	5	0	0	0	2	0	3 (Note: Appearances in UEFA Europa League)	0	—		10	0
Manchester United	2020–21	Premier League	9	0	1	0	1	0	8 (Note: Five appearances in UEFA Champions League, three appearances in UEFA Europa League)	0	—		19	0
Manchester United	2021–22	Premier League	0	0	0	0	0	0	0	0	—		0	0
Manchester United	2022–23	Premier League	0	0	0	0	0	0	0	0	—		0	0
Manchester United	Total		19	0	2	0	4	0	12	0	0	0	37	0
Aston Villa (loan)	2017–18	Championship	5	0	—		—		—		0	0	5	0
Aston Villa (loan)	2018–19	Championship	25	0	0	0	2	0	—		3 (Note: Appearances in Championship play-offs)	0	30	0
Aston Villa (loan)	2021–22	Premier League	9	0	—		2	0	—		—		11	0
Aston Villa (loan)	Total		39	0	0	0	4	0	—		3	0	46	0
Napoli (loan)	2021–22	Serie A	1	0	1	0	—		0	0	—		2	0
Stoke City (loan)	2022–23	Championship	4	0	1	0	—		—		—		5	0
Ipswich Town	2023–24	Championship	19	0	2	1	1	0	—		—		22	1
Ipswich Town	2024–25	Premier League	22	0	1	0	0	0	—		—		23	0
Ipswich Town	Total		41	0	3	1	1	0	0	0	0	0	45	1
Burnley	2025–26	Premier League	14	1	0	0	2	0	—		—		16	1
Auxerre	2026–27	Ligue 1	2	0	0	0	—		—		—		2	0
Career total			120	1	7	1	11	0	12	0	3	0	153	2

=== International ===
As of match played 28 September 2026

Appearances and goals by national team and year
National team	Year	Apps	Goals
DR Congo	2024	3	0
DR Congo	2025	6	0
DR Congo	2026	10	1
Total		19	1

Scores and results list DR Congo's goal tally first, score column indicates score after each Tuanzebe goal.

List of international goals scored by Axel Tuanzebe
No.	Date	Venue	Opponent	Score	Result	Competition
1	31 March 2026	Estadio Akron, Zapopan, Mexico	Jamaica	1–0	1–0 (a.e.t.)	2026 FIFA World Cup qualification

== Honours ==
Manchester United

- UEFA Europa League: 2016–17; runner-up: 2020–21

Aston Villa

- EFL Championship play-offs: 2019

Ipswich Town

- EFL Championship runner-up: 2023–24

Individual

- Jimmy Murphy Young Player of the Year: 2014–15
- Denzil Haroun Reserve Team Player of the Year: 2016–17
