= 2019 EFL Championship play-off final =

Association football match in London

- The match took place at Wembley Stadium
- Event: 2018–19 EFL Championship
Aston Villa	Derby County
2	1
- Date: 27 May 2019
- Venue: Wembley Stadium, London
- Man of the Match: John McGinn (Aston Villa)
- Referee: Paul Tierney
- Attendance: 85,826

The 2019 EFL Championship play-off final was an association football match which was played on 27 May 2019 at Wembley Stadium, London, between Aston Villa and Derby County to determine the third and final team to gain promotion from the EFL Championship to the Premier League. The top two teams of the 2018–19 EFL Championship season gained automatic promotion to the Premier League, while the teams placed from third to sixth place in the table partook in play-off semi-finals; the winners of these semi-finals competed for the final place for the 2019–20 season in the Premier League. Winning the game was estimated to be worth £170 million to the successful team.

Aston Villa had lost in the play-off final the previous season while Derby had failed to progress through the play-offs three times in the last five seasons. The 2019 final was watched by a crowd of almost 86,000 people and refereed by Paul Tierney. Villa took the lead through Anwar El Ghazi late in the first half, and doubled their advantage with a goal from man of the match John McGinn. Despite a late consolation goal from Derby's Jack Marriott, Villa won the match 2–1 to return to the Premier League for the first time since the 2015–16 season.

Derby's next season, in the 2019–20 EFL Championship, was their twelfth consecutive in the second tier of English football. The season was delayed due to the COVID-19 pandemic in the United Kingdom, and concluded in July 2020 with Derby in tenth position in the table, six points outside the playoffs. Villa's next season, in the Premier League, was also interrupted by the pandemic. They finished the season in 17th position, avoiding relegation by one place and one point.

== Route to the final ==
EFL Championship final table, leading positions
Pos	Team	Pld	W	D	L	GF	GA	GD	Pts
1	Norwich City	46	27	13	6	93	57	+36	94
2	Sheffield United	46	26	11	9	78	41	+37	89
3	Leeds United	46	25	8	13	73	50	+23	83
4	West Bromwich Albion	46	23	11	12	87	62	+25	80
5	Aston Villa	46	20	16	10	82	61	+21	76
6	Derby County	46	20	14	12	69	54	+15	74

Aston Villa finished the regular 2018–19 season in fifth place in the EFL Championship, the second tier of the English football league system, one place ahead of Derby. Both therefore missed out on the two automatic places for promotion to the Premier League and instead took part in the play-offs to determine the third promoted team. Aston Villa were thirteenth in the table heading into March and went on a ten-game winning streak, starting with a 4–0 home win over Derby. The run of wins was the longest in the club's history and secured them a play-off place with two games of the season remaining. They finished 13 points behind Sheffield United (who were promoted in second place) and 18 behind league winners Norwich City. Derby ended the league in sixth place, a further two points behind Villa.

Derby lost the first leg of the play-off semi-finals at home at Pride Park against Leeds United 1–0 thanks to a second-half Kemar Roofe goal. The second leg, at Leeds' Elland Road, was described by Ian Woodcock writing for BBC Sport as "a wild night". Stuart Dallas had doubled Leeds' aggregate lead midway through the first half. Marriott scored for Derby following a defensive error early in the second half, with goals from Mason Mount and Harry Wilson giving Derby a 3–2 lead. Dallas scored his second goal midway through the second half before his teammate Gaetano Berardi was sent off for a foul. Marriott's late strike secured a 4–2 lead on the night and a 4–3 aggregate victory for Derby. It was the first time that a Championship club had qualified for the play-off final having lost the first semi-final leg at home.

Aston Villa faced West Bromwich Albion in their play-off semi-final, the first leg was held at Villa Park. West Brom took the lead through Dwight Gayle before two goals in three minutes for Villa, a Conor Hourihane strike from 25 yards (23 m) and a penalty from Tammy Abraham, ended the tie 2–1; Gayle was sent off towards the end of the game for a late tackle on the Villa goalkeeper meaning he would miss the second leg. The return fixture was played at West Brom's The Hawthorns where the home team took the lead after 29 minutes with a Craig Dawson goal to equalise the semi-final on aggregate. Chris Brunt was sent off in the second half as Villa dominated the match, but failed to score a winner. A goalless extra time was played before a penalty shoot-out decided the tie. Two saves from Villa goalkeeper Jed Steer allowed Abraham to score the winning spot kick and send Villa to Wembley for their second consecutive play-off final.

Aston Villa			Round	Derby County
Opponent	Result	Legs	Semi-finals	Opponent	Result	Legs
West Bromwich Albion	2–2 (4–3 p.)	2–1 home; 0–1 (a.e.t.) away		Leeds United	4–3	0–1 home; 4–2 away

== Match ==
=== Background ===
This was Aston Villa's second consecutive appearance in the play-off final having lost 1–0 to Fulham in the 2018 final. Derby County had last been promoted the top flight of English football through the playoffs in 2007, beating West Bromwich Albion 1–0 in the final. Derby had also reached the play-offs three times in the previous five years: they were losing semi-finalists in 2016 and 2018, and losing finalists in 2014. During the regular season, Aston Villa had beaten Derby 7–0 on aggregate: they won 3–0 at Pride Park in November 2018 and 4–0 at Villa Park the following March.

Derby were without their regular left-back Scott Malone – he was sent off in injury time in the second semi-final against Leeds after receiving a second yellow and was suspended for the final. Martyn Waghorn was a doubt having been injured in the last game of the league, but was selected as a substitute. However, Craig Bryson and Andy King were ruled out, both with ankle injuries. Villa's loan defender Axel Tuanzebe passed a late fitness test after he picked up an injury against West Bromwich Albion in the semi-final, but Ørjan Nyland, Tom Carroll and Jordan Lyden were all sidelined with long-term injuries. There was considerable speculation in the media over Lampard's future at Derby with him being strongly linked with a move to manage his former club Chelsea. Lampard sought to reassure the Derby fans of his commitment: "I'll say straight away to the Derby fans, my focus all year has been how well I can do in this job, because this club gave me an opportunity. And I want to finish this season as well as I can."

The final was refereed by Paul Tierney from the Lancashire County Football Association, with assistant referees Ian Hussin and Adrian Holmes, and Chris Kavanagh acted as the fourth official. It was widely reported that the game was worth around £170 million over three years to the winners through sponsorship and television deals. Before the match, both teams were introduced to the match officials and various dignitaries on the pitch, including Debbie Jevans, the interim head of the EFL. Prince William, Duke of Cambridge, an Aston Villa supporter, watched from the stands. Aston Villa were considered favourites to win the match by the media and bookmakers. The final was broadcast in the United Kingdom live on Sky Sports Main Event.

=== First half ===
Aston Villa kicked off at 3 p.m. in front of a crowd of 85,826 people, and for the first few minutes of the match, neither team dominated. After five minutes, Villa's captain Jack Grealish passed the ball into the Derby penalty area but despite a defensive mix-up, Axel Tuanzebe was unable to finish, missing the ball altogether. Two minutes later Grealish himself shot over the bar from the edge of the box. In the 13th minute, Jayden Bogle was dispossessed during a rare Derby attack, but a tackle from Richard Keogh denied El Ghazi a chance to score. A corner in the 16th minute from Villa's Ahmed Elmohamady was struck wide by John McGinn. The first booking of the match came in the 27th minute: El Ghazi pulled Bogle back on the edge of the area and Villa's Dutch winger was shown a yellow card. Harry Wilson's resulting free kick floated aimlessly out of play. On 31 minutes, Mason Bennett crossed into the Villa box, only for Tyrone Mings to clear the danger. Two minutes later, Villa's Tammy Abraham received the ball on the edge of the area, turned and advanced; his shot flew high and wide. In the 37th minute, Mason Mount's shot for Derby was easily saved by Jed Steer in the Villa goal. In immediate response, Grealish sent through a pass for El Ghazi but the winger was flagged for offside. On 41 minutes, Keogh failed to convert a Derby corner despite being unmarked, his header going over the bar. Just before half-time, El Ghazi was picked out by a cross from Elmohamady, diving between two defenders to score with his shoulder from six yards, ensuring Villa held a 1–0 advantage at the break.

=== Second half ===
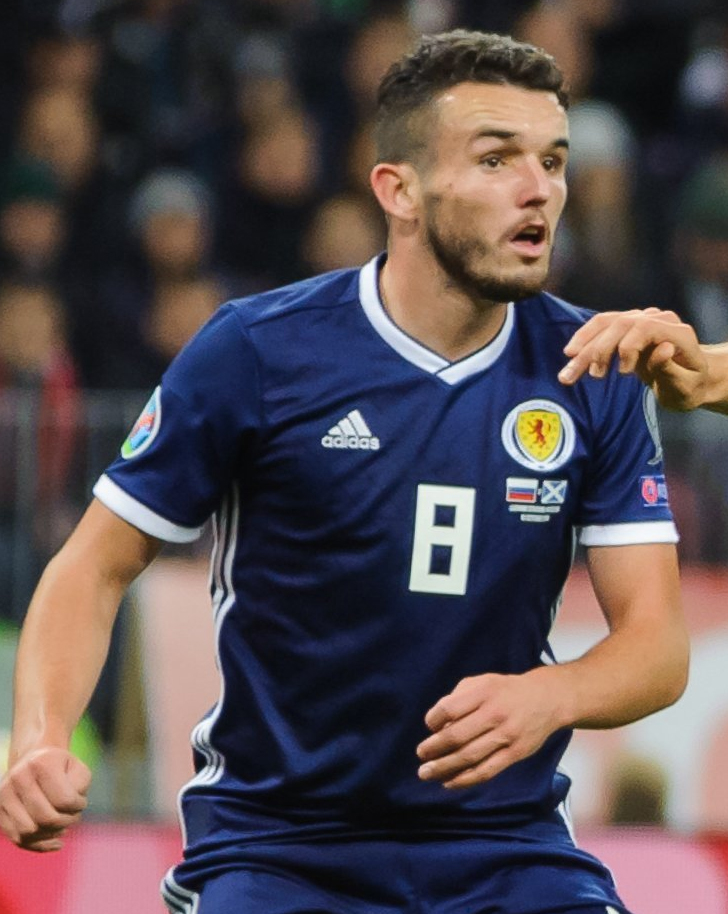
John McGinn (pictured playing for Scotland) scored Aston Villa's second goal and was named man of the match.

No changes to either team were made at half-time, and Derby kicked off the second half. Two minutes in, Bennett was booked for a foul on Abraham, with Hourihane also receiving a yellow card for a foul on Wilson a minute later. In the 50th minute, Tomori brought McGinn down and was shown the fourth yellow card of the match. Bogle's trip on El Ghazi in the 53rd minute resulted in a free kick which was taken by Hourihane whose cross for Mings was punched clear by the Derby goalkeeper Kelle Roos. Villa extended their lead in the 59th minute with a goal from McGinn. El-Ghazi's shot took a large deflection and looped into the air as Roos came to claim the ball. McGinn beat him to the ball and headed it into the Derby net. Derby County manager Frank Lampard made his first substitution immediately afterwards, sending on striker Marriott to replace the defensive midfielder Tom Huddlestone.

Midway through the second half, Villa's penalty appeals were denied after El Ghazi was brought down by Keogh. Derby's second substitution came in the 68th minute with Bennett being replaced by Waghorn. El Ghazi's 70th-minute strike was easily held by Roos and a minute later, Derby's Bogle struck the side netting with a shot despite Waghorn being in a better position to score. In the 73rd minute, Derby made their final substitution, Florian Jozefzoon coming on for Tom Lawrence, while Villa's Andre Green replaced Albert Adomah. Marriott's shot from a corner in the 76th minute passed just wide of the post and seconds later a counterattack from Grealish came to nothing as instead of shooting, his square pass was intercepted by Bradley Johnson. Derby reduced the deficit to a single goal as Marriott scored in the 82nd minute. A clearance from Mings was collected by Jozefzoon whose cross was headed on to Marriott; he controlled the ball and struck it into the bottom left of the Villa goal. Mings, injured in the previous phase of play, was taken off and replaced with Kortney Hause. Seven minutes of additional time was indicated by the fourth official, and Wilson was booked for a foul two minutes later. Despite multiple attacks from Derby, no second goal was forthcoming and the match ended 2–1 in Villa's favour.

=== Details ===
27 May 2019
15:00 BST

Aston Villa	2–1	Derby County
El Ghazi 44'; McGinn 59'	Report	Marriott 81'

Wembley Stadium, London
Attendance: 85,826
Referee: Paul Tierney

Aston Villa	Derby County

GK	12	(England) Jed Steer
RB	27	(Egypt) Ahmed Elmohamady
CB	4	(England) Axel Tuanzebe
CB	40	(England) Tyrone Mings		(substituted off) 86'
LB	3	(Wales) Neil Taylor
RM	7	(Scotland) John McGinn
CM	14	(Republic of Ireland) Conor Hourihane	(yellow card) 48'
LM	10	(England) Jack Grealish (c)
RF	37	(Ghana) Albert Adomah		(substituted off) 73'
CF	18	(England) Tammy Abraham
LF	22	(Netherlands) Anwar El Ghazi	(yellow card) 28'
Substitutes:
MF	6	(Republic of Ireland) Glenn Whelan
MF	8	(England) Henri Lansbury
MF	15	(Australia) Mile Jedinak
MF	19	(England) Andre Green		(substituted on) 73'
FW	26	(Ivory Coast) Jonathan Kodjia
GK	28	(Croatia) Lovre Kalinić
DF	30	(England) Kortney Hause		(substituted on) 86'
Manager:
(England) Dean Smith

GK	21	(Netherlands) Kelle Roos
RB	37	(England) Jayden Bogle
CB	6	(Republic of Ireland) Richard Keogh (c)
CB	5	(England) Fikayo Tomori	(yellow card) 51'
LB	26	(England) Ashley Cole
CM	8	(England) Mason Mount
DM	44	(England) Tom Huddlestone		(substituted off) 63'
CM	15	(England) Bradley Johnson
AM	7	(Wales) Harry Wilson	(yellow card) 90+2'
CF	10	(Wales) Tom Lawrence		(substituted off) 73'
CF	20	(England) Mason Bennett	(yellow card) 47'	(substituted off) 69'
Substitutes:
GK	1	(England) Scott Carson
FW	9	(England) Martyn Waghorn		(substituted on) 69'
MF	11	(Netherlands) Florian Jozefzoon		(substituted on) 73'
FW	14	(England) Jack Marriott		(substituted on) 63'
MF	17	(England) George Evans
DF	39	(Scotland) Calum Macdonald
MF	50	(Republic of Ireland) Jason Knight
Manager:
(England) Frank Lampard

Man of the Match:
John McGinn (Aston Villa)

=== Statistics ===
Statistics
	Aston Villa	Derby County
Goals scored	2	1
Shots on target	3	2
Shots off target	6	8
Fouls committed	12	16
Corner kicks	3	5
Yellow cards	2	3
Red cards	0	0

== Post-match ==
After the game, Aston Villa manager Dean Smith remarked: "it feels very good ... We've got two owners who have got a lot of money, and are in it for the long haul. The potential now is massive ... we made history by winning ten games on the spin." Grealish, the Villa captain, said it "was such a hard game going up against a great team. We knew it was hard and it would go down to the wire ... It’s like a dream." Lampard was appointed Chelsea manager with a three-year deal on 4 July 2019, and was replaced at Derby by former Dutch international player Phillip Cocu. John McGinn was named as the man of the match.

Derby's next season, in the 2019–20 EFL Championship, was their twelfth consecutive in the second tier of English football. The season was delayed due to the COVID-19 pandemic in the United Kingdom, and concluded in July 2020 with Derby in tenth position in the table, six points outside the playoffs. Villa's next season, in the Premier League, was also interrupted by the pandemic. They finished the season in 17th position, avoiding relegation by one place and one point.
