= Kortney Hause =

English footballer (born 1995)

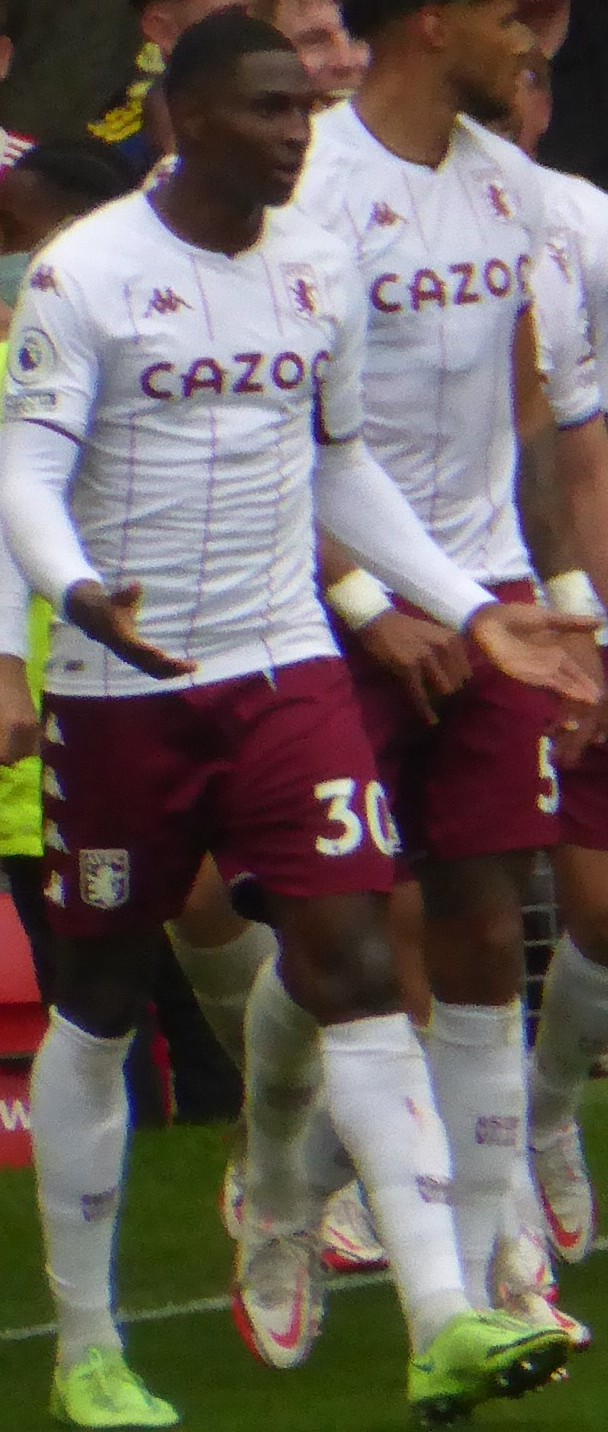
- Hause with Aston Villa in 2021

Personal information
- Full name: Kortney Paul Duncan Hause
- Date of birth: 16 July 1995 (age 31)
- Place of birth: Goodmayes, London, England
- Height: 6 ft 3 in (1.91 m)
- Positions: Centre-back; left-back

Youth career
- Lakeview
- 2003–2011: West Ham United
- 2011–2012: Birmingham City
- 2012: Wycombe Wanderers

Senior career*
Years	Team	Apps	(Gls)
2012–2014	Wycombe Wanderers	23	(2)
2014–2019	Wolverhampton Wanderers	67	(2)
2014	→ Gillingham (loan)	14	(1)
2019	→ Aston Villa (loan)	11	(1)
2019–2025	Aston Villa	32	(3)
2022–2023	→ Watford (loan)	3	(0)

International career
2014–2015	England U20	9	(2)
2015–2017	England U21	10	(0)
- * Club domestic league appearances and goals as of 03:00, 12 June 2025 (UTC)

Kortney Paul Duncan Hause (born 16 July 1995) is an English professional footballer who plays as a centre-back or left-back.

A former English youth international, Hause was a regular for both of England's U20 and U21 sides and played in Gareth Southgate's victorious 2016 Toulon Tournament with the latter.

== Club career ==
=== Early career ===
Hause was released by West Ham United at sixteen having joined the club's academy at a young age from his local side Lakeview F.C. He had been a regular for West Ham's under-16s, including taking part in a tour of Bermuda in 2010. He went on to sign for Birmingham City as a scholar following his release, joining alongside fellow West Ham youngster Charlee Adams in late 2011.

=== Wycombe Wanderers ===
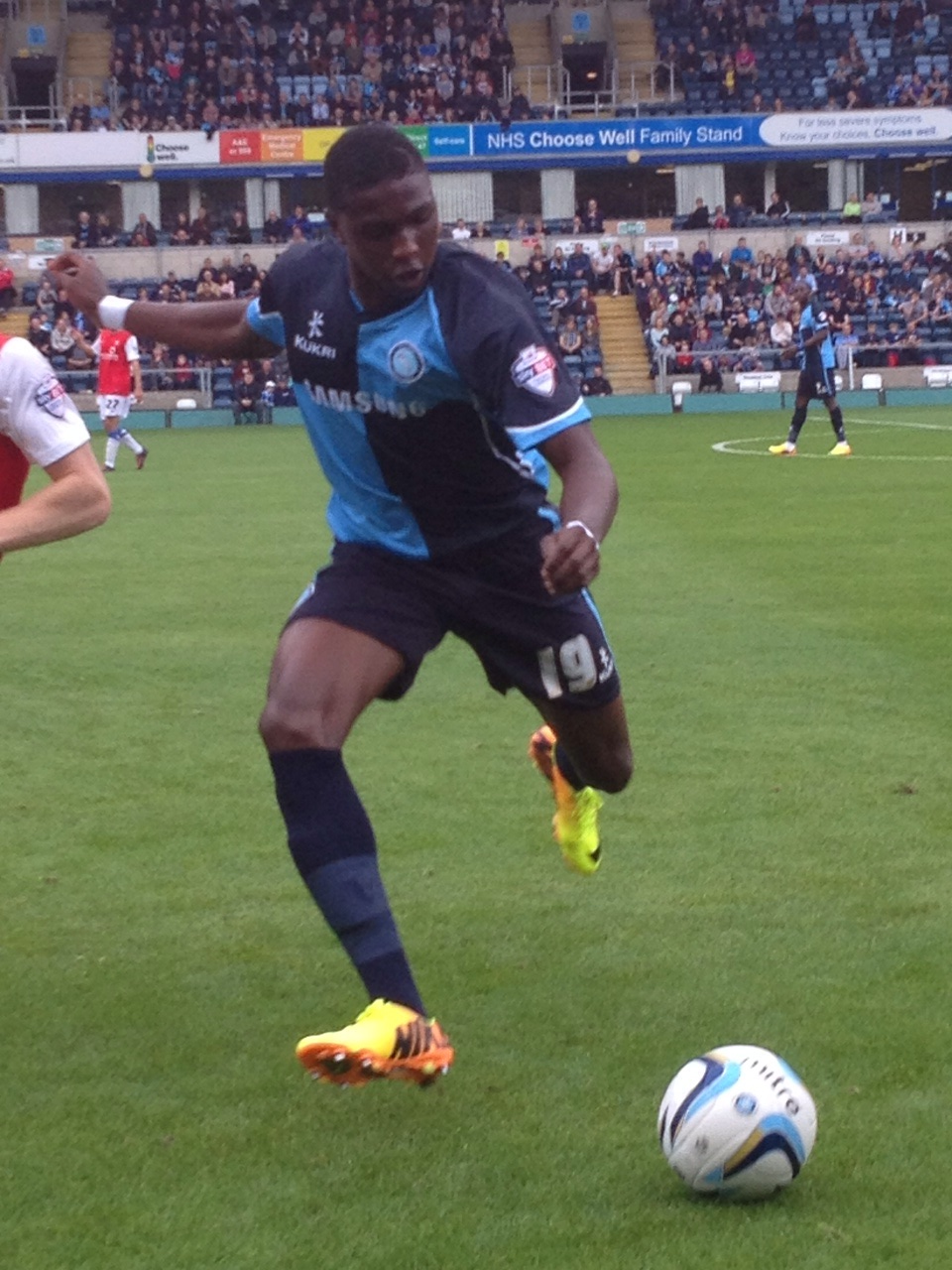
Hause playing for Wycombe Wanderers in 2014

Having spent only a few months at Birmingham, Hause signed youth team forms with Wycombe Wanderers in February 2012. He signed his first professional contract for Wycombe only a few months after signing youth forms in July 2012. He went on to make his professional debut on 3 November 2012, coming on as a substitute in a 4–1 defeat to Crewe Alexandra in the FA Cup. During the 2013–14 season he became a regular player for Wycombe until suffering an ankle fracture in November 2013.

=== Wolverhampton Wanderers ===
On 31 January 2014 he signed for Wolverhampton Wanderers in a 2 1/2-year deal for an undisclosed fee.

In July 2014 Wolves agreed to loan Hause to League One club Gillingham until January 2015. He scored his first goal for Gillingham in a 2–2 draw with Swindon Town on 19 August 2014. However, his loan was cut short in November 2014 when he was recalled by Wolves after having made 17 appearances in total for the Gills. He made his Wolves debut on 13 December 2014 in a 1–0 win at Sheffield Wednesday.

After the departure of Richard Stearman to Fulham, Hause became a main part in the Wolves defence. On 24 October 2015, in a 1–3 loss to Middlesbrough, he suffered a torn hamstring that ruled him out for at least 6 weeks. He scored his first goal for Wolves against Fulham on 10 December 2016.

Having signed a three-year deal in April 2018, Hause was contracted to Wolves until the summer of 2021.

=== Aston Villa ===
On 7 January 2019, Hause signed for Aston Villa on loan until the end of the season with an option of a permanent transfer. Hause made his Aston Villa debut on 12 January, in a 3–0 away defeat by Wigan Athletic. He scored his first Villa goal on 13 March, in a 3–1 away victory over Nottingham Forest.

On 17 June 2019, after gaining promotion to the Premier League, Aston Villa announced that they had taken up the option to permanently transfer Hause. The transfer fee was reported as £3m.

On 25 September 2021, Hause scored the only goal at the 88th minute in a match against Manchester United, helping his team win 1–0.

On 22 August 2022, Hause joined Watford on a season-long loan. Whilst on loan, Hause suffered repeated knee problems that limited his game time. In January 2023, Watford attempted to terminate Hause's loan, however Villa refused the request and Hause remained at the club until the end of the season, but was not included in the squad for the second half of the Championship season, so did not feature at all.

The following season, after undergoing multiple knee surgeries, it was reported that Hause was training with the Villa's U21 team in a bid to gain fitness and find a move away from the club. In January 2024, Hause returned to first team training for the first time since his last competitive appearance, 15 months ago whilst on loan with Watford.

After being in and out of first team training, Hause did not make a return to Aston Villa's first team. After over two years without a competitive match, in December 2024 Hause responded to media reports that Aston Villa would look to end his contract, indicating that he understood the club's decision and he would not fight the process.

On 1 April 2025, Hause played his first recorded football since 2023, playing the first half for Aston Villa's U21 team, in a 1–0 defeat to Burton Albion U21s in the Birmingham Senior Cup. On 9 June, it was announced that Hause would be released by Aston Villa when his contract expired at the end of the season.

== International career ==
Hause was a regular England U20 and England U21 international and played in Gareth Southgate's victorious 2016 Toulon Tournament side with the latter, including starting in the final against France in a 2–1 victory.

== Personal life ==
Hause attended Oaks Park High School, Ilford. Hause is a rapper in his time away from football, using the alias Korts. He is of Bermudian descent.

== Career statistics ==
As of match played 17 September 2022

Appearances and goals by club, season and competition
Club	Season	League			FA Cup		League Cup		Other		Total	
Club	Season	Division	Apps	Goals	Apps	Goals	Apps	Goals	Apps	Goals	Apps	Goals
Wycombe Wanderers	2012–13	League Two	9	1	1	0	0	0	1 (Note: Appearance(s) in Football League Trophy)	0	11	1
Wycombe Wanderers	2013–14	League Two	14	1	2	0	1	0	3	0	20	1
Wycombe Wanderers	Total		23	2	3	0	1	0	4	0	31	2
Wolverhampton Wanderers	2013–14	League One	0	0	—		—		—		0	0
Wolverhampton Wanderers	2014–15	Championship	17	0	—		—		—		17	0
Wolverhampton Wanderers	2015–16	Championship	25	0	0	0	2	0	—		27	0
Wolverhampton Wanderers	2016–17	Championship	24	2	3	0	3	0	—		30	2
Wolverhampton Wanderers	2017–18	Championship	1	0	2	0	1	0	—		4	0
Wolverhampton Wanderers	2018–19	Premier League	0	0	0	0	2	0			2	0
Wolverhampton Wanderers	Total		67	2	5	0	8	0	—		80	2
Gillingham (loan)	2014–15	League One	14	1	1	0	2	0	0	0	17	1
Aston Villa (loan)	2018–19	Championship	11	1	—		—		1 (Note: Appearance in Championship play-offs)	0	12	1
Aston Villa	2019–20	Premier League	18	1	0	0	6	0	—		24	1
Aston Villa	2020–21	Premier League	7	1	0	0	3	0	—		10	1
Aston Villa	2021–22	Premier League	7	1	0	0	2	0	—		9	1
Aston Villa	2022–23	Premier League	0	0	0	0	0	0	—		0	0
Aston Villa	2023–24	Premier League	0	0	0	0	0	0	0	0	0	0
Aston Villa	2024–25	Premier League	0	0	0	0	0	0	0	0	0	0
Aston Villa	Total		32	3	0	0	11	0	0	0	43	3
Watford (loan)	2022–23	Championship	3	0	0	0	0	0	—		3	0
Career total			150	9	9	0	22	0	5	0	186	9

== Honours ==
Aston Villa

- EFL Championship play-offs: 2019

England U21

- Toulon Tournament: 2016
