= 2019 EFL play-offs =

EFL play-offs
- Wembley Stadium was the venue for each play-off final
- Season: 2018–19

The English Football League play-offs for the 2018–19 season (referred to as the Sky Bet Play-Offs for sponsorship reasons) were held in April 2019 with all finals played at Wembley Stadium in London. The play-offs will begin in each league with two semi-finals played over two legs. The teams who finish in 3rd, 4th, 5th and 6th place in the Championship and League One and the 4th, 5th, 6th and 7th-placed teams in League Two are set to compete. The winners of the semi-finals advance to the finals, with the winners gaining promotion for the following season.

== Background ==
The English Football League play-offs have been held every year since 1987. They take place for each division following the conclusion of the regular season and are contested by the four clubs finishing below the automatic promotion places. The fixtures are determined by final league position – in the Championship and League One this is 3rd v 6th and 4th v 5th, while in League Two it is 4th v 7th and 5th v 24th And 22nd Vs 23rd In Relegation Playoffs

== Championship ==
=== Championship semi-finals ===
Final league position – Championship
Pos	Team	Pld	W	D	L	GF	GA	GD	Pts
3	Leeds United	46	25	8	13	73	50	+23	83
4	West Bromwich Albion	46	23	11	12	87	61	+26	80
5	Aston Villa	46	20	16	10	81	59	+21	76
6	Derby County	46	20	14	12	69	53	+16	74

First leg

11 May 2019
12:30 BST

Aston Villa	2–1	West Bromwich Albion
Hourihane 75'; Abraham 79' (pen.)	Report	Gayle 16'

Villa Park, Birmingham
Attendance: 40,754
Referee: Graham Scott
11 May 2019
17:15 BST

Derby County	0–1	Leeds United
	Report	Roofe 55'

Pride Park Stadium, Derby
Attendance: 31,723
Referee: Craig Pawson

Second leg

14 May 2019
20:00 BST

West Bromwich Albion	1–0 (a.e.t.)	Aston Villa
Dawson 29'	Report
Penalties
Holgate (penalty missed); Hegazi (penalty missed); Adarabioyo (penalty scored); Gibbs (penalty scored); Morrison (penalty scored)	3–4	(penalty scored) Hourihane; (penalty scored) Jedinak; (penalty scored) Grealish; (penalty missed) Adomah; (penalty scored) Abraham

The Hawthorns, West Bromwich
Attendance: 25,702
Referee: Chris Kavanagh

West Bromwich Albion 2–2 Aston Villa on aggregate. Aston Villa won 4–3 on penalties.

15 May 2019
19:45 BST

Leeds United	2–4	Derby County
Dallas 23', 62'	Report	Marriott 45', 85'; Mount 46'; Wilson 58' (pen.)

Elland Road, Leeds
Attendance: 36,326
Referee: Anthony Taylor

Derby County won 4–3 on aggregate.

=== Championship final ===
27 May 2019
15:00 BST

Aston Villa	2–1	Derby County
El Ghazi 44'; McGinn 59'	Report	Marriott 81'

Wembley Stadium, London
Attendance: 85,826
Referee: Paul Tierney

== League One ==
=== League One semi-finals ===
Final league position – League One
Pos	Team	Pld	W	D	L	GF	GA	GD	Pts
3	Charlton Athletic	46	26	10	10	73	40	+33	88
4	Portsmouth	46	25	13	8	83	51	+32	88
5	Sunderland	46	22	19	5	80	47	+33	85
6	Doncaster Rovers	46	20	13	13	76	58	+16	73

First leg

11 May 2019
19:30 BST

Sunderland	1–0	Portsmouth
Maguire 62'	Report

Stadium of Light, Sunderland
Attendance: 26,610
Referee: Andy Woolmer
12 May 2019
12:15 BST

Doncaster Rovers	1–2	Charlton Athletic
Blair 87'	Report	Taylor 32'; Aribo 34'

Keepmoat Stadium, Doncaster
Attendance: 11,140
Referee: Oliver Langford

Second leg

16 May 2019
19:45 BST

Portsmouth	0–0	Sunderland

Fratton Park, Portsmouth
Attendance: 18,007
Referee: Peter Bankes

Sunderland won 1–0 on aggregate.

17 May 2019
19:45 BST

Charlton Athletic	2–3 (a.e.t.)	Doncaster Rovers
Bielik 2'; Pratley 101'		Rowe 11'; Butler 88'; Marquis 100'
Penalties
Solly (penalty scored); Cullen (penalty scored); Taylor (penalty scored); Aribo (penalty scored); Sarr (penalty missed)	4–3	(penalty scored) Whiteman; (penalty scored) Sadlier; (penalty scored) Crawford; (penalty missed) Marquis; (penalty missed) Rowe

The Valley, London
Attendance: 25,428
Referee: Gavin Ward

Charlton Athletic 4–4 Doncaster Rovers on aggregate. Charlton Athletic won 4–3 on penalties.

=== League One final ===
26 May 2019
15:00 BST

Charlton Athletic	2–1	Sunderland
Purrington 35'; Bauer 90+4'	Report	Sarr 5' (o.g.)

Wembley Stadium, London
Attendance: 76,155
Referee: Andrew Madley

== League Two ==
=== League Two semi-finals ===
Final league position – League Two
Pos	Team	Pld	W	D	L	GF	GA	GD	Pts
4	Mansfield Town	46	20	16	10	69	41	+28	76
5	Forest Green Rovers	46	20	14	12	68	47	+21	74
6	Tranmere Rovers	46	20	13	13	63	50	+13	73
7	Newport County	46	20	11	15	59	59	0	71

First leg

9 May 2019
19:45 BST

Newport County	1–1	Mansfield Town
Amond 83'	Report	Hamilton 12'

Rodney Parade, Newport
Attendance: 6,035
Referee: Charles Breakspear
10 May 2019
19:45 BST

Tranmere Rovers	1–0	Forest Green Rovers
Banks 26'	Report

Prenton Park, Birkenhead
Attendance: 9,579
Referee: John Busby

Second leg

12 May 2019
18:00 BST

Mansfield Town	0–0 (a.e.t.)	Newport County
	Report
Penalties
Ajose (penalty scored); Hamilton (penalty scored); Walker (penalty missed); Benning (penalty scored)	3–5	(penalty scored) Butler; (penalty scored) Amond; (penalty scored) Demetriou; (penalty scored) Poole; (penalty scored) Dolan

Field Mill, Mansfield
Attendance: 7,361
Referee: Michael Salisbury

Mansfield Town 1–1 Newport County on aggregate. Newport County won 5–3 on penalties.

13 May 2019
19:45 BST

Forest Green Rovers	1–1	Tranmere Rovers
Mills 12'	Report	Norwood 27'

The New Lawn, Nailsworth
Attendance: 4,492
Referee: Eddie Ilderton

Tranmere Rovers won 2–1 on aggregate.

=== League Two final ===
25 May 2019
15:00 BST (UTC+1)

Newport County	0–1 (a.e.t.)	Tranmere Rovers
		Jennings 119'

Wembley Stadium, London
Attendance: 25,217
Referee: Ross Joyce
