= 2023 Premier League Summer Series =

Tournament details
- Host country: United States
- Dates: July 22–30
- Teams: 6 (from 1 confederation)
- Venues: 5 (in 5 host cities)

Final positions
- Champions: Chelsea (1st title)
- Runners-up: Aston Villa
- Third place: Newcastle United
- Fourth place: Brighton & Hove Albion

Tournament statistics
- Matches played: 9
- Goals scored: 35 (3.89 per match)
- Attendance: 422,244 (46,916 per match)
- Top scorer(s): Elliot Anderson (3 goals)

The 2023 Premier League Summer Series was the first edition of the Premier League Summer Series, a friendly pre-season tournament organised by the English Premier League in the United States.

Chelsea were crowned champions of the tournament with two wins and one draw in three matches.

== Format ==
The six invited Premier League teams (Aston Villa, Brentford, Brighton & Hove Albion, Chelsea, Fulham and Newcastle United) each played three matches, never facing the same opposition more than once. Teams were awarded three points for a win, one for a draw and zero for a loss. Following the conclusion of the tournament, the club with the most points was named the winner of the Premier League Summer Series. If multiple teams were tied on points, their position in the table was to be determined based on superior goal difference, then number of goals scored, and then results of head-to-head matches.

== Venues ==
Philadelphia, Pennsylvania	Atlanta, Georgia	Orlando, Florida	Location of the host cities of the 2023 Premier League Summer Series.
Lincoln Financial Field	Mercedes-Benz Stadium	Exploria Stadium	Location of the host cities of the 2023 Premier League Summer Series.
Capacity: 71,896	Capacity: 71,000	Capacity: 25,500	Location of the host cities of the 2023 Premier League Summer Series.
Harrison, New Jersey	Landover, Maryland		Location of the host cities of the 2023 Premier League Summer Series.
Red Bull Arena	FedExField		Location of the host cities of the 2023 Premier League Summer Series.
Capacity: 25,000	Capacity: 62,000		Location of the host cities of the 2023 Premier League Summer Series.

== Standings ==
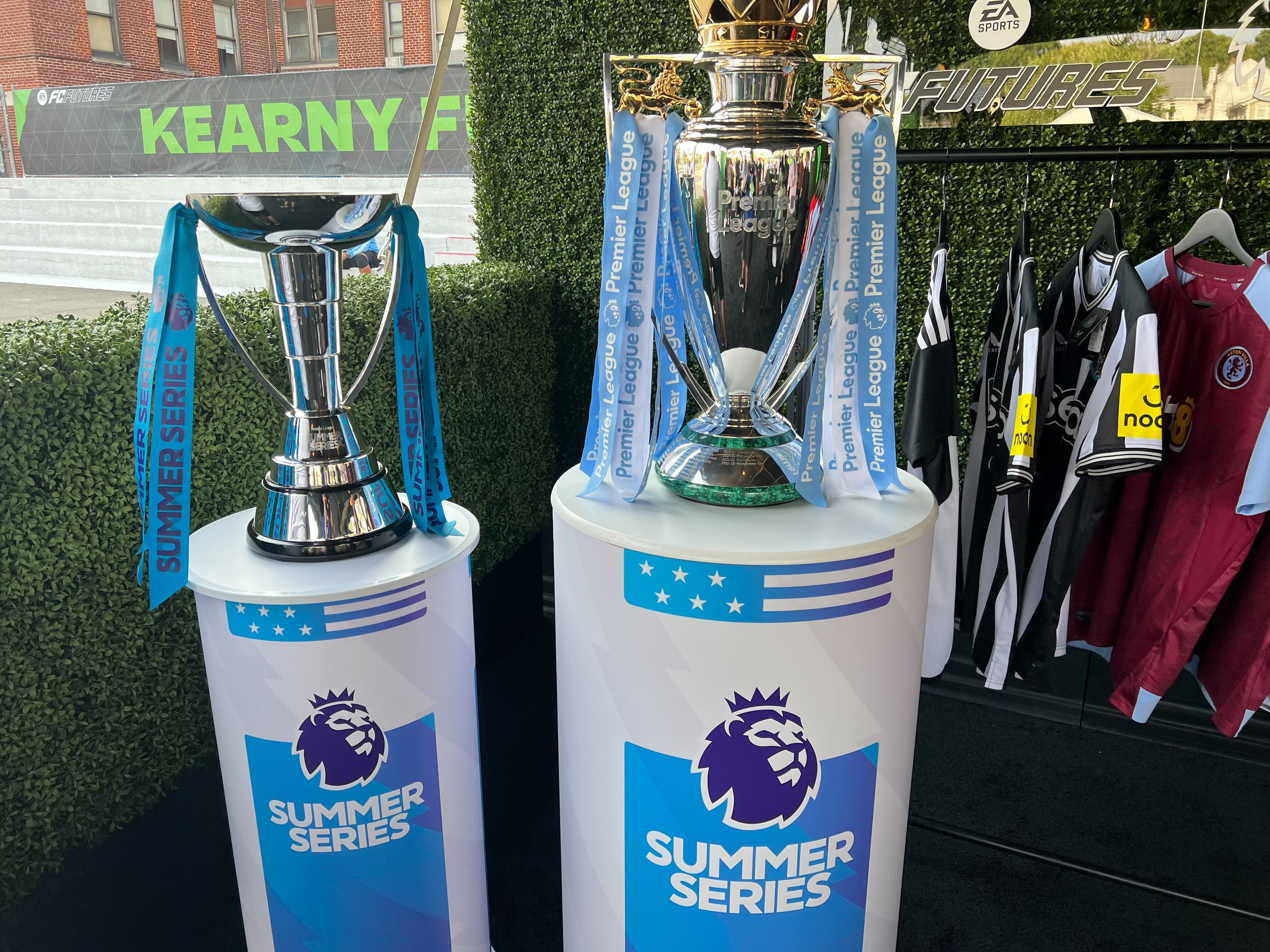
The Premier League Summer Series trophy (left) and Premier League trophy (right) on display during an event in Kearny, New Jersey.

Pos	Team	Pld	W	D	L	GF	GA	GD	Pts	Final result
1	Chelsea (C)	3	2	1	0	7	4	+3	7	2023 Premier League Summer Series winners
2	Aston Villa	3	1	2	0	8	6	+2	5	
3	Newcastle United	3	1	2	0	6	5	+1	5	
4	Brighton & Hove Albion	3	1	0	2	6	6	0	3	
5	Fulham	3	1	0	2	3	6	−3	3	
6	Brentford	3	0	1	2	5	8	−3	1	

Source: Premier League
Rules for classification: 1) Points; 2) Goal difference; 3) Goals scored; 4) Head-to-head result; 5) Fair play ranking.
(C) Champions

== Results ==
All times are EST.

=== Matchday 1 ===
July 22, 2023
19:00

Chelsea	4–3	Brighton & Hove Albion
Nkunku 19'; Mudryk 65'; Gallagher 72'; Jackson 76'	Report	Welbeck 13'; João Pedro 79' (pen.); Undav 89'

Lincoln Financial Field, Philadelphia, Pennsylvania
Attendance: 65,128
Referee: Robert Jones
July 23, 2023
16:00

Fulham	3–2	Brentford
Wilson 3'; De Cordova-Reid 36'; Carlos Vinícius 47'	Report	Wissa 7'; Ajer 48'

Lincoln Financial Field, Philadelphia, Pennsylvania
Attendance: 40,332
Referee: Peter Bankes
July 23, 2023
19:00

Newcastle United	3–3	Aston Villa
Anderson 28'; Isak 45+2'; Wilson 55'	Report	Watkins 7'; Buendía 11', 48'

Lincoln Financial Field, Philadelphia, Pennsylvania
Attendance: 40,230
Referee: Lukasz Szpala

=== Matchday 2 ===
July 26, 2023
17:30

Brentford	0–2	Brighton & Hove Albion
	Report	Adingra 19', 58'

Mercedes-Benz Stadium, Atlanta, Georgia
Attendance: 70,789
Referee: Guido Gonzales Jr.
July 26, 2023
19:00

Fulham	0–2	Aston Villa
	Report	Philogene 40'; Diaby 73'

Exploria Stadium, Orlando, Florida
Attendance: 16,134
Referee: Robert Jones
July 26, 2023
20:15

Newcastle United	1–1	Chelsea
Almirón 45+4'	Report	Jackson 12'

Mercedes-Benz Stadium, Atlanta, Georgia
Attendance: 70,789
Referee: Peter Bankes

=== Matchday 3 ===
July 28, 2023
19:30

Brighton & Hove Albion	1–2	Newcastle United
Welbeck 49'	Report	Anderson 86', 90+2'

Red Bull Arena, Harrison, New Jersey
Attendance: 26,150
Referee: Sergii Demianchuk
July 30, 2023
12:00

Aston Villa	3–3	Brentford
Konsa 27'; Diaby 32'; Cash 37'	Report	Mbeumo 9' (pen.); Dasilva 22'; Baptiste 66'

FedExField, Landover, Maryland
Attendance: 46,346
Referee: Peter Bankes
July 30, 2023
14:45

Chelsea	2–0	Fulham
Thiago Silva 20'; Nkunku 41'	Report

FedExField, Landover, Maryland
Attendance: 46,346
Referee: Robert Jones

== Goalscorers ==
Rank	Player	Club	Goals
1	(Scotland) Elliot Anderson	Newcastle United	3
2	(Argentina) Emiliano Buendía	Aston Villa	2
2	(France) Moussa Diaby	Aston Villa	2
2	(Senegal) Nicolas Jackson	Chelsea	2
2	(France) Christopher Nkunku	Chelsea	2
2	(Ivory Coast) Simon Adingra	Brighton & Hove Albion	2
2	(England) Danny Welbeck	Brighton & Hove Albion	2
8	(Norway) Kristoffer Ajer	Brentford	1
8	(Grenada) Shandon Baptiste	Brentford	1
8	(Democratic Republic of the Congo) Yoane Wissa	Brentford	1
8	(England) Josh Dasilva	Brentford	1
8	(Cameroon) Bryan Mbeumo	Brentford	1
8	(Paraguay) Miguel Almirón	Newcastle United	1
8	(England) Callum Wilson	Newcastle United	1
8	(Sweden) Alexander Isak	Newcastle United	1
8	(Poland) Matty Cash	Aston Villa	1
8	(England) Ezri Konsa	Aston Villa	1
8	(England) Jaden Philogene	Aston Villa	1
8	(England) Ollie Watkins	Aston Villa	1
8	(England) Conor Gallagher	Chelsea	1
8	(Ukraine) Mykhailo Mudryk	Chelsea	1
8	(Brazil) Thiago Silva	Chelsea	1
8	(Brazil) João Pedro	Brighton & Hove Albion	1
8	(Germany) Deniz Undav	Brighton & Hove Albion	1
8	(Jamaica) Bobby De Cordova-Reid	Fulham	1
8	(Brazil) Carlos Vinícius	Fulham	1
8	(Wales) Harry Wilson	Fulham	1
