= 2023–24 Aston Villa F.C. season =

English football club season

Aston Villa
2023–24 season
- Owner: Nassef Sawiris; Wes Edens
- Chairman: Nassef Sawiris
- Manager: Unai Emery
- Stadium: Villa Park
- Premier League: 4th
- FA Cup: Fourth round
- EFL Cup: Third round
- UEFA Europa Conference League: Semi-finals
- Top goalscorer: League: Ollie Watkins (19); All: Ollie Watkins (27)
- Highest home attendance: 42,640 vs Wolverhampton Wanderers, Premier League, 30 March 2024
- Lowest home attendance: 23,851 vs Everton, EFL Cup, 27 September 2023
- Average home league attendance: 41,384
- Biggest win: 5–0 vs Hibernian, UEFA Europa Conference League, 23 August 2023; 6–1 vs Brighton & Hove Albion, Premier League, 30 September 2023; 5–0 vs Sheffield United, Premier League, 3 February 2024
- Biggest defeat: 0–5 vs Crystal Palace, Premier League, 19 May 2024
Home colours	Away colours	Third colours

The 2023–24 season was Aston Villa's 29th season in the Premier League and the 149th season in the history of Aston Villa Football Club, their fifth consecutive season in the Premier League, and their 110th overall season in the top flight of English football. In addition to playing in the domestic league, the club participated in the FA Cup, the EFL Cup and the UEFA Europa Conference League, the latter being their first European campaign since the 2010–11 season.

On 14 May 2024, the club officially clinched fourth place in the league and qualification to the UEFA Champions League for the first time since the 1981–82 season, when it was still known as the European Cup. This league marked the highest Aston Villa Premier League finish since 1995–96. Their Europa Conference League campaign concluded at the semi-final stage to the eventual winners Olympiacos and signified their best performance in a UEFA Competition since reaching and winning the inaugural European Cup Final in 1982 against Bayern Munich.

This was the first season since 2012-13 not to feature Goalkeeper Jed Steer. He left the club after his contract expired.

== Players ==
As of 19 May 2024

No.	Player	Position	Nationality	Place of birth	Date of birth (age at end of season)	Signed from	Date signed	Fee	Contract end	Apps	Goals
Goalkeepers
1	Emiliano Martínez	GK	(Argentina)	Mar del Plata	2 September 1992 (aged 31)	Arsenal	16 September 2020	£17,000,000	30 June 2027	159	0
18	Joe Gauci	GK	(Australia)	Adelaide	4 July 2000 (aged 23)	(Australia) Adelaide United	1 February 2024	£1,290,000	30 June 2028	0	0
25	Robin Olsen	GK	(Sweden)	Malmö	8 January 1990 (aged 34)	(Italy) Roma	4 June 2022	£3,000,000	30 June 2025	17	0
55	Lander Emery	GK	(Spain)	Madrid	29 March 2003 (aged 21)	(Spain) Valencia	1 January 2024	Free Transfer	-	0	0
64	James Wright	GK	(England)		2 December 2004 (aged 19)	Manchester City	1 July 2021	Free transfer	30 June 2027	0	0
78	Sam Proctor	GK	(England)	Boston	21 December 2006 (aged 17)	Peterborough United	1 January 2021	Free transfer	30 June 2027	0	0
Defenders
2	Matty Cash	RB	(Poland)	(England) Slough	7 August 1997 (aged 26)	Nottingham Forest	3 September 2020	£14,000,000	30 June 2027	141	9
3	Diego Carlos	CB	(Brazil)	Barra Bonita	15 March 1993 (aged 31)	(Spain) Sevilla	10 June 2022	£31,000,000	30 June 2026	40	1
4	Ezri Konsa	CB	(England)	Newham	23 October 1997 (aged 26)	Brentford	11 July 2019	£13,000,000	30 June 2028	187	7
5	Tyrone Mings	CB	(England)	Bath	13 March 1993 (aged 31)	Bournemouth	8 July 2019	£22,000,000	30 June 2026	166	8
12	Lucas Digne	LB	(France)	Meaux	20 July 1993 (aged 30)	Everton	13 January 2022	£30,000,000	30 June 2026	93	4
14	Pau Torres	CB	(Spain)	Villarreal	16 January 1997 (aged 27)	(Spain) Villarreal	12 July 2023	£31,500,000	30 June 2028	39	2
15	Àlex Moreno	LB	(Spain)	Sant Sadurní d'Anoia	8 June 1993 (aged 31)	(Spain) Real Betis	11 January 2023	£13,000,000	30 June 2026	47	3
16	Calum Chambers	CB	(England)	Petersfield	20 January 1995 (aged 29)	Arsenal	27 January 2022	Free transfer	30 June 2025	36	1
17	Clément Lenglet	CB	(France)	Beauvais	17 June 1995 (aged 29)	(Spain) Barcelona	1 September 2023	Season-long loan	30 June 2024	24	0
29	Kaine Kesler-Hayden	RB	(England)	Birmingham	23 October 2002 (aged 21)	Academy	1 July 2021	—N/a	30 June 2026	5	0
30	Kortney Hause	CB	(England)	Goodmayes	16 July 1995 (aged 28)	Wolverhampton Wanderers	17 June 2019	£3,000,000	30 June 2025	43	3
50	Sil Swinkels	CB	(Netherlands)	Sint-Oedenrode	6 January 2004 (aged 20)	(Netherlands) Vitesse	1 July 2020	Free transfer	30 June 2026	1	0
69	Finley Munroe	LB	(England)		8 February 2005 (aged 19)	Chelsea	1 July 2021	Free transfer	30 June 2026	2	0
Midfielders
6	Douglas Luiz	CM	(Brazil)	Rio de Janeiro	9 May 1998 (aged 26)	Manchester City	25 July 2019	£16,000,000	30 June 2026	203	22
7	John McGinn (c)	CM	(Scotland)	Glasgow	18 October 1994 (aged 29)	(Scotland) Hibernian	8 August 2018	£3,000,000	30 June 2027	235	26
8	Youri Tielemans	CM	(Belgium)	Sint-Pieters-Leeuw	7 May 1997 (aged 27)	Leicester City	1 July 2023	Free transfer	30 June 2027	45	3
10	Emiliano Buendía	AM	(Argentina)	Mar del Plata	25 December 1996 (aged 27)	Norwich City	10 June 2021	£38,000,000	30 June 2026	78	9
22	Nicolò Zaniolo	AM	(Italy)	Massa	2 July 1999 (aged 24)	(Turkey) Galatasaray	18 August 2023	Season-long loan	30 June 2024	39	3
41	Jacob Ramsey	CM	(England)	Great Barr	28 May 2001 (aged 23)	Academy	1 July 2020	—N/a	30 June 2027	122	13
44	Boubacar Kamara	DM	(France)	Marseille	23 November 1999 (aged 24)	(France) Marseille	1 July 2022	Free transfer	30 June 2027	55	1
47	Tim Iroegbunam	CM	(England)	Great Barr	30 June 2003 (aged 21)	Academy	1 July 2022	—N/a	30 June 2027	19	0
52	Lamare Bogarde	DM	(Netherlands)	Rotterdam	5 January 2004 (aged 20)	(Netherlands) Feyenoord	1 September 2020	Free transfer	30 June 2026	1	0
Forwards
11	Ollie Watkins	CF	(England)	Torquay	30 December 1995 (aged 28)	Brentford	9 September 2020	£34,000,000	30 June 2028	168	70
19	Moussa Diaby	RW	(France)	Paris	7 July 1999 (aged 24)	(Germany) Bayer Leverkusen	22 July 2023	£51,900,000	30 June 2028	54	10
24	Jhon Durán	CF	(Colombia)	Medellín	13 December 2003 (aged 20)	(United States) Chicago Fire	23 January 2023	£14,750,000	30 June 2026	48	8
27	Morgan Rogers	LW	(England)	Halesowen	26 July 2002 (aged 21)	Middlesbrough	1 February 2024	£8,000,000	30 June 2030	16	3
31	Leon Bailey	RW	(Jamaica)	Kingston	9 August 1997 (aged 26)	(Germany) Bayer Leverkusen	4 August 2021	£32,000,000	30 June 2027	106	20
57	Ajani Burchall	RW	(Bermuda)	Hamilton	5 November 2004 (aged 19)	Bournemouth	9 July 2021	£125,000	30 June 2025	0	0
62	Chisom Afoka	LW	(England)		23 September 2003 (aged 20)	Academy	1 July 2023	—N/a	30 June 2024	0	0
65	Rory Wilson	CF	(Scotland)	Girvan	5 January 2006 (aged 18)	(Scotland) Rangers	1 July 2022	£350,000	30 June 2026	0	0
71	Omari Kellyman	RW	(England)	Derby	25 September 2005 (aged 18)	Derby County	6 March 2022	£600,000	30 June 2027	6	0
72	Kadan Young	RW	(England)	Erdington	19 January 2006 (aged 18)	Academy	1 July 2023	—N/a	30 June 2025	0	0
Out on loan
20	Morgan Sanson	CM	(France)	Saint-Doulchard	18 August 1994 (aged 29)	(France) Marseille	26 January 2021	£15,000,000	30 June 2025	23	1
23	Philippe Coutinho	LW	(Brazil)	Rio de Janeiro	12 June 1992 (aged 32)	(Spain) Barcelona	10 June 2022	£20,000,000	30 June 2026	43	6
32	Leander Dendoncker	DM	(Belgium)	Passendale	15 April 1995 (aged 29)	Wolverhampton Wanderers	1 September 2022	£13,000,000	30 June 2025	36	1
35	Louie Barry	LW	(England)	Sutton Coldfield	21 June 2003 (aged 21)	(Spain) Barcelona	23 January 2020	£880,000	30 June 2025	1	1
38	Viljami Sinisalo	GK	(Finland)	Hyvinkää	11 October 2001 (aged 22)	Academy	1 July 2021	—N/a	30 June 2025	0	0
42	Filip Marschall	GK	(England)	Cambridge	24 April 2003 (aged 21)	Cambridge City	26 January 2018	Free transfer	30 June 2027	1	0
45	Ben Chrisene	LB	(England)	Exeter	12 January 2004 (aged 20)	Exeter City	19 August 2020	£450,000	30 June 2026	1	0
46	Rico Richards	AM	(England)	West Bromwich	27 September 2003 (aged 20)	West Bromwich Albion	3 July 2023	Free transfer	30 June 2026	0	0
48	Oliwier Zych	GK	(Poland)	Gdnyia	28 June 2004 (aged 20)	Zagłębie Lubin	29 September 2020	Free transfer	30 June 2025	0	0
51	Edward Rowe	CM	(England)	Birmingham	17 October 2003 (aged 20)	Academy	1 July 2021	—N/a	30 June 2025	1	0
56	Sebastian Revan	LB	(England)	West Bromwich	14 July 2003 (aged 20)	Academy	1 July 2020	—N/a	30 June 2026	6	1
58	Tommi O'Reilly	CM	(England)	Birmingham	15 December 2003 (aged 20)	Academy	1 July 2021	—N/a	30 June 2028	1	0
59	Josh Feeney	CB	(England)	Fleetwood	6 May 2005 (aged 19)	Fleetwood Town	6 July 2021	Free transfer	30 June 2025	0	0
63	Kerr Smith	CB	(Scotland)	Montrose	12 December 2004 (aged 19)	(Scotland) Dundee United	14 January 2022	£2,000,000	30 June 2028	0	0
—N/a	Kosta Nedeljković	RB	(Serbia)	Smederevo	15 December 2005 (aged 18)	(Serbia) Red Star Belgrade	22 January 2024	£6,500,000	30 June 2029	0	0
—N/a	Lino Sousa	LB	(England)	(Portugal) Lisbon	19 January 2005 (aged 19)	Arsenal	1 February 2024	Undisclosed	30 June 2028	0	0

== Transfers ==
=== Transferred in ===
Date	Pos.	Player	Transferred from	Fee	Ref.
24 June 2023	CAM	(Northern Ireland) Cole Brannigan (Note: Academy transfer.)	(Northern Ireland) Linfield	£150,000	
24 June 2023	CB	(Northern Ireland) Callum Moreland	(Northern Ireland) Linfield	Undisclosed	
1 July 2023 (Note: Transfer was announced by Aston Villa on 10 June, but would take effect on 1 July, when Tielemans contract with Leicester City had expired.)	CM	(Belgium) Youri Tielemans	(England) Leicester City	Free transfer	
3 July 2023	AM	(England) Rico Richards	(England) West Bromwich Albion	Free transfer	
12 July 2023	CB	(Spain) Pau Torres	(Spain) Villarreal	£31.5m	
22 July 2023	RW	(France) Moussa Diaby	(Germany) Bayer Leverkusen	£51.9m	
14 August 2023	CM	(England) Jamaldeen Jimoh-Aloba	(England) West Bromwich Albion	£1m	
28 September 2023	CM	(England) Freddie Lawrie	(England) Port Vale	Undisclosed	
9 January 2024	CM	(England) George Hemmings	(England) Nottingham Forest	Undisclosed	
22 January 2024	RB	(Serbia) Kosta Nedeljković	(Serbia) Red Star Belgrade	£6.5m	
1 February 2024	GK	(Australia) Joe Gauci	(Australia) Adelaide United	£1.29m	
1 February 2024	LW	(England) Morgan Rogers	(England) Middlesbrough	£8m	
1 February 2024	LB	(England) Lino Sousa	(England) Arsenal	Undisclosed	
27 March 2024	GK	(England) Jack Allan	(England) Portsmouth	Free transfer	

=== Loaned in ===
Date	Pos.	Player	Loaned from	Expiry date	Loan fee	Ref.
18 August 2023	AM	(Italy) Nicolò Zaniolo	(Turkey) Galatasaray	30 June 2024	£4.27m	
1 September 2023	CB	(France) Clément Lenglet	(Spain) Barcelona	30 June 2024	Undisclosed	

=== Transferred out ===
Date	Pos.	Player	Transferred to	Fee	Ref.
30 June 2023	CF	(England) DJ Campton-Sturridge	(England) Solihull Moors	Released	
30 June 2023	CM	(England) Declan Frith	(Spain) Valencia	Released	
30 June 2023	GK	(England) Josh Lane	Free agent	Released	
30 June 2023	CM	(England) Hayden Lindley	(England) Darlington	Released	
30 June 2023	CM	(England) Arjan Raikhy	(England) Leicester City	Released	
30 June 2023	CF	(England) Ruben Shakpoke	(England) West Bromwich Albion	Released	
30 June 2023	CM	(England) Myles Sohna	Free agent	Released	
30 June 2023	GK	(England) Jed Steer	Free agent	Released	
30 June 2023	RB	(England) Ashley Young	(England) Everton	Released	
30 June 2023	RW	(England) Brad Young	(Wales) The New Saints	Released	
20 July 2023	DM	(Zimbabwe) Marvelous Nakamba	(England) Luton Town	Undisclosed	
28 July 2023	CF	(Brazil) Wesley	(England) Stoke City	Undisclosed	
22 August 2023	AM	(England) Aaron Ramsey	(England) Burnley	£12m	
27 August 2023	CF	(England) Cameron Archer	(England) Sheffield United	£18m	
31 August 2023 (Note: Occurring during the summer transfer window, the exact date of Chukwuemeka's release was not announced by Aston Villa.)	CF	(England) Caleb Chukwuemeka	Free agent	Released	
1 September 2023	CF	(England) Keinan Davis	(Italy) Udinese	Undisclosed	
1 September 2023	LW	(England) Jaden Philogene	(England) Hull City	£5m	
5 January 2024	AM	(Republic of Ireland) Finn Azaz	(England) Middlesbrough	£2m	
1 February 2024	RW	(Burkina Faso) Bertrand Traoré	(Spain) Villarreal	Free Transfer	

=== Loaned out ===
Date	Pos.	Player	Loaned to	Expiry date	Ref.
29 June 2023	RB	(England) Kaine Kesler-Hayden	(England) Plymouth Argyle	14 January 2024 (Note: On 14 January, Kesler-Hayden was recalled from his season-long loan at Plymouth.)	
19 July 2023	GK	(Finland) Viljami Sinisalo	(England) Exeter City	End of season	
24 July 2023	CM	(France) Morgan Sanson	(France) Nice	End of season	
28 July 2023	RW	(England) Louie Barry	(England) Stockport County	End of season	
2 August 2023	CM	(Republic of Ireland) Finn Azaz	(England) Plymouth Argyle	3 January 2024 (Note: On 3 January, Azaz was recalled from his season-long loan at Plymouth. He was subsequently sold to Middlesbrough.)	
18 August 2023	DM	(Netherlands) Lamare Bogarde	(England) Bristol Rovers	4 January 2024 (Note: On 4 January, Bogarde was recalled from his season-long loan at Bristol Rovers.)	
1 September 2023	LW	(England) Chisom Afoka	(England) Bradford City	3 January 2024 (Note: On 3 January, Afoka was recalled from his season-long loan at Bradford.)	
1 September 2023	LB	(England) Sebastian Revan	(England) Rotherham United	End of season	
4 September 2023	GK	(Poland) Oliwier Zych	(Poland) Puszcza Niepołomice	End of season	
8 September 2023	LW	(Brazil) Philippe Coutinho	(Qatar) Al-Duhail	End of season	
2 January 2024	CB	(Scotland) Kerr Smith	(Scotland) St Johnstone	End of season	
5 January 2024	LB	(England) Ben Chrisene	(England) Blackburn Rovers	End of season	
12 January 2024	CM	(England) Edward Rowe	(England) Gloucester City	End of season	
18 January 2024	AM	(England) Rico Richards	(England) Stockport County	End of season	
19 January 2024	GK	(England) Filip Marschall	(England) Milton Keynes Dons	End of season	
22 January 2024	RB	(Serbia) Kosta Nedeljković	(Serbia) Red Star Belgrade	End of season	
26 January 2024	DM	(Belgium) Leander Dendoncker	(Italy) Napoli	End of season	
1 February 2024	CB	(England) Josh Feeney	(Spain) Real Unión	End of season	
1 February 2024	AM	(England) Tommi O'Reilly	(Spain) Real Unión	End of season	
1 February 2024	LB	(England) Lino Sousa	(England) Plymouth Argyle	End of season	

== Kits ==
Home	Alt. Home 2	Alt. Home 3	Away	Away Alt. 2	Away Alt. 3	Third

== Pre-season and friendlies ==
Win Draw Loss Fixtures

Villa announced a tour of the United States to take part in the Premier League Summer Series pre-season tournament with matches against Newcastle United, Fulham and Brentford. On 2 June 2023, a friendly at the Bescot Stadium against Lazio and the traditional pre-season friendly against Walsall were announced. On 12 June 2023, a friendly was announced for an Aston Villa XI with local non-league club Rushall Olympic. On 19 June, an away match with Valencia for the Orange Trophy was also added to the pre-season schedule.

15 July 2023 Friendly	Walsall	1–1	Aston Villa	Walsall
13:00 BST	Johnson 31'	Report	Watkins 43' (pen.)	Stadium: Bescot Stadium; Attendance: 9,328; Referee: Thomas Parsons
Note: Ollie Watkins penalty into the bottom corner, won by Jaden Philogene.

23 July 2023 Premier League Summer Series	Newcastle United	3–3	Aston Villa	Philadelphia, United States
19:00 EDT	Anderson 28'; Isak 45+2'; Wilson 55'; Burn (yellow card) 90+4'	Report	Watkins 7'; Buendía 11', 48'	Stadium: Lincoln Financial Field; Attendance: 40,230; Referee: Lukasz Szpala (United States)
Note: Pau Torres and Youri Tielemans debut, coming on as substitutes.

26 July 2023 Premier League Summer Series	Fulham	0–2	Aston Villa	Orlando, United States
19:00 EDT	De Fougerolles (yellow card) 30'; Carlos Vinícius (yellow card) 35'	Report	Konsa (yellow card) 35'; Philogene 40', (yellow card) 47'; Diaby 73'	Stadium: Exploria Stadium; Attendance: 16,134; Referee: Robert Jones
Note: Moussa Diaby scores on debut

30 July 2023 Premier League Summer Series	Aston Villa	3–3	Brentford	Landover, United States
12:00 EDT	Konsa (yellow card) 8', (goal) 27'; Diaby 32'; Cash 37'; Douglas Luiz (yellow card) 88'	Report	Mbeumo 9' (pen.); Dasilva 22'; Baptiste 66'	Stadium: FedEx Field; Referee: Peter Bankes
Note: Ezri Konsa solo goal from just outside his own area to the top corner.

1 August 2023 Friendly	Rushall Olympic	3–2	Aston Villa XI	Rushall
19:45 BST	Carvalho-Landell 30'; Gosling 70'; Waldron 87'	Report	Afoka 21'; Moore 44'	Stadium: Dales Lane

3 August 2023 Friendly	Aston Villa	3–0	Lazio	Walsall
19:30 BST	Watkins (penalty missed) 14', 37'; McGinn 55'; Mings (yellow card) 76'; Gila 85' (o.g.)	Report	Marušić (yellow card) 38'; Castellanos (yellow card) 76'; Patric (yellow card) 88'	Stadium: Bescot Stadium; Attendance: 10,388; Referee: Peter Bankes (England)

5 August 2023 Orange Trophy	Valencia	1–2	Aston Villa	Valencia, Spain
21:00 CEST	Gabriel (yellow card) 45+2'; Duro (yellow card) 58'; Chambers 88' (o.g.)	Report	Watkins 22'; Bailey (yellow card) 45+2'; Douglas Luiz (yellow card) 58'; Buendía 66'	Stadium: Mestalla; Referee: Guillermo Cuadra Fernández (Spain)

== Competitions ==
=== Overall record ===
Competition	First match	Last match	Starting round	Final position	Record							
Competition	First match	Last match	Starting round	Final position	Pld	W	D	L	GF	GA	GD	Win %
Premier League	12 August 2023	19 May 2024	Matchday 1	4th	38	20	8	10	76	61	+15	52.63
FA Cup	6 January 2024	7 February 2024	Third round	Fourth round	3	1	1	1	2	3	−1	33.33
EFL Cup	27 September 2023		Third round	Third round	1	0	0	1	1	2	−1	0.00
UEFA Europa Conference League	23 August 2023	9 May 2024	Play-off round	Semi-finals	14	8	2	4	29	16	+13	57.14
Total					56	29	11	16	108	82	+26	51.79

Source: Soccerway

=== Premier League ===
==== League table ====
Pos	Team	Pld	W	D	L	GF	GA	GD	Pts	Qualification or relegation
2	Arsenal	38	28	5	5	91	29	+62	89	Qualification for the Champions League league phase
3	Liverpool	38	24	10	4	86	41	+45	82	Qualification for the Champions League league phase
4	Aston Villa	38	20	8	10	76	61	+15	68	Qualification for the Champions League league phase
5	Tottenham Hotspur	38	20	6	12	74	61	+13	66	Qualification for the Europa League league phase
6	Chelsea	38	18	9	11	77	63	+14	63	Qualification for the Conference League play-off round (Note: Since the winners of the 2023–24 EFL Cup, Liverpool, qualified for the Champions League, the spot given to the League Cup winners (Conference League play-off round) was passed to the sixth-placed team.)

Source: Premier League
Rules for classification: 1) Points; 2) Goal difference; 3) Goals scored; 4) If the champions, relegated teams or qualified teams for UEFA competitions cannot be determined by rules 1 to 3, rules 4.1 to 4.3 are applied – 4.1) Points gained in head-to-head record between such teams; 4.2) Away goals scored in head-to-head record between such teams; 4.3) Play-offs

==== Results summary ====
Overall								Home						Away					
Pld	W	D	L	GF	GA	GD	Pts	W	D	L	GF	GA	GD	W	D	L	GF	GA	GD
38	20	8	10	76	61	+15	68	12	4	3	48	28	+20	8	4	7	28	33	−5

Source: Soccerway

==== Results by round ====
Round	1	2	3	4	5	6	7	8	9	10	11	12	13	14	15	16	17	18	19	20	21	22	23	24	25	26	27	28	29	30	31	32	33	34	35	36	37	38
Ground	A	H	A	A	H	A	H	A	H	H	A	H	A	A	H	H	A	H	A	H	A	H	A	H	A	H	A	H	A	H	A	H	A	H	H	A	H	A
Result	L	W	W	L	W	W	W	D	W	W	L	W	W	D	W	W	W	D	L	W	D	L	W	L	W	W	W	L	D	W	L	D	W	W	D	L	D	L
Position	20	9	7	10	7	6	5	5	5	5	5	5	4	4	3	3	3	3	3	2	4	5	4	5	4	4	4	4	4	4	4	5	4	4	4	4	4	4
Points	0	3	6	6	9	12	15	16	19	22	22	25	28	29	32	35	38	39	39	42	43	43	46	46	49	52	55	55	56	59	59	60	63	66	67	67	68	68

Source: Soccerway
A = Away; H = Home; W = Win; D = Draw; L = Loss

==== Matches ====
On 15 June, the Premier League fixtures were released.

Win Draw Loss Fixtures

12 August 2023 1	Newcastle United	5–1	Aston Villa	Newcastle upon Tyne
17:30 BST	Tonali 6', (yellow card) 90+2'; Isak 16', 58'; Botman (yellow card) 45+9'; Gordon (yellow card) 53'; Bruno Guimarães (yellow card) 67'; Wilson 77'; Barnes 90+1'	Report	Douglas Luiz (yellow card) 6'; Diaby 11'; Digne (yellow card) 32'; Martínez (yellow card) 45+9'; Cash (yellow card) 48'	Stadium: St James' Park; Attendance: 52,207 (3,202 away); Referee: Andrew Madley
Note: Live on Sky Sports

20 August 2023 2	Aston Villa	4–0	Everton	Birmingham
14:00 BST	Douglas Luiz (yellow card) 14', (goal) 24' (pen.); McGinn 18'; Digne (yellow card) 33'; Bailey 51'; Durán 75'; Archer (yellow card) 89'	Report	Pickford (yellow card) 24'; Keane (yellow card) 45+4'; Gueye (yellow card) 45+9'; Patterson (yellow card) 86'	Stadium: Villa Park; Attendance: 41,694 (3,001 away); Referee: Anthony Taylor
Note: Live on Sky Sports

27 August 2023 3	Burnley	1–3	Aston Villa	Burnley
14:00 BST	Cullen (yellow card) 39'; Berge (yellow card) 45+3'; Foster 47'	Report	Cash 8', 20'; Diaby 61'	Stadium: Turf Moor; Attendance: 21,591 (2,305 away); Referee: Michael Salisbury

3 September 2023 4	Liverpool	3–0	Aston Villa	Liverpool
14:00 BST	Szoboszlai 3'; Cash 22' (o.g.); Salah 55'	Report	Kamara (yellow card) 26'	Stadium: Anfield; Attendance: 50,109 (2,444 away); Referee: Simon Hooper

16 September 2023 5	Aston Villa	3–1	Crystal Palace	Birmingham
15:00 BST	McGinn (yellow card) 17'; Zaniolo (yellow card) 45+4'; Cash (yellow card) 86'; Durán 87', (yellow card) 90+15'; Douglas Luiz 90+8' (pen.); Bailey 90+11', (yellow card) 90+14'	Report	Eze (yellow card) 17'; Édouard 47'; Hughes (yellow card) 53'; Ward (yellow card) 90+9'	Stadium: Villa Park; Attendance: 40,809 (2,691 away); Referee: Darren England

24 September 2023 6	Chelsea	0–1	Aston Villa	Fulham
14:00 BST	Jackson (yellow card) 50'; Gusto (red card) 58'; Chilwell (yellow card) 90'	Report	Digne (yellow card) 44'; Watkins 73'; Douglas Luiz (yellow card) 90+1'; Martínez (yellow card) 90+4'	Stadium: Stamford Bridge; Attendance: 39,700 (3,054 away); Referee: Jarred Gillett

30 September 2023 7	Aston Villa	6–1	Brighton & Hove Albion	Birmingham
12:30 BST	Douglas Luiz (yellow card) 7', (goal) 90+7'; Watkins 14', 21', 65'; Estupiñán 26' (o.g.); Digne (yellow card) 32'; Konsa (yellow card) 57'; Ramsey 85'; Durán (yellow card) 90+5'	Report	Welbeck (yellow card) 39'; Fati 50', (yellow card) 72'; Dunk (yellow card) 78'; Mitoma (yellow card) 84'	Stadium: Villa Park; Attendance: 40,636 (3,000 away); Referee: Andrew Madley
Note: Live on TNT Sports

8 October 2023 8	Wolverhampton Wanderers	1–1	Aston Villa	Wolverhampton
14:00 BST	Dawson (yellow card) 28'; Hwang 53'; Lemina (yellow card) 62' (yellow-red card) 90+4'; Semedo (yellow card) 67'	Report	Kamara (yellow card) 6'; McGinn (yellow card) 29'; Torres 55'	Stadium: Molineux Stadium; Attendance: 31,578 (2,951 away); Referee: Robert Jones

22 October 2023 9	Aston Villa	4–1	West Ham United	Birmingham
16:30 BST	Douglas Luiz 30', 51' (pen.); Watkins 74'; Bailey 89'	Report	Emerson (yellow card) 54'; Bowen 56'	Stadium: Villa Park; Attendance: 41,734 (3,005 away); Referee: David Coote
Note: Live on Sky Sports

29 October 2023 10	Aston Villa	3–1	Luton Town	Birmingham
14:00 GMT	McGinn 17'; Zaniolo (yellow card) 28'; Diaby 49'; Cash (yellow card) 51'; Lockyer 62' (o.g.); Kamara (yellow card) 71'	Report	Kaboré (yellow card) 53'; Doughty (yellow card) 75'; Martínez 83' (o.g.)	Stadium: Villa Park; Attendance: 41,785 (3,005 away); Referee: John Brooks

5 November 2023 11	Nottingham Forest	2–0	Aston Villa	West Bridgford
14:00 GMT	Aina 5'; Mangala 47'; Danilo (yellow card) 88'	Report	Kamara (yellow card) 64'	Stadium: City Ground; Attendance: 29,313 (2,888 away); Referee: Jarred Gillett
Note: Live on Sky Sports

12 November 2023 12	Aston Villa	3–1	Fulham	Birmingham
14:00 GMT	Robinson 27' (o.g.); McGinn 42'; Watkins 64', (yellow card) 66'; Konsa (yellow card) 83'	Report	Palhinha (yellow card) 52'; Robinson (yellow card) 65'; Jiménez 70'; Iwobi (yellow card) 74'; Carlos Vinícius (yellow card) 90+4'; Reed (yellow card) 90+6'	Stadium: Villa Park; Attendance: 41,608 (1,401 away); Referee: Simon Hooper

26 November 2023 13	Tottenham Hotspur	1–2	Aston Villa	Tottenham
14:00 GMT	Lo Celso 22'	Report	Cash (yellow card) 27'; Kamara (yellow card) 38'; McGinn (yellow card) 41'; Torres 45+7'; Watkins 61', (yellow card) 82'	Stadium: Tottenham Hotspur Stadium; Attendance: 61,679 (3,038 away); Referee: Robert Jones
Note: Live on Sky Sports

3 December 2023 14	Bournemouth	2–2	Aston Villa	Bournemouth
14:00 GMT	Semenyo 10', (yellow card) 17'; Kluivert (yellow card) 12'; Senesi (yellow card) 45+4'; Solanke 52'; Christie (yellow card) 54'; Kerkez (yellow card) 84'	Report	Bailey 20'; Torres (yellow card) 30'; Zaniolo (yellow card) 43'; Durán (yellow card) 84'; Watkins 90'	Stadium: Dean Court; Attendance: 11,191 (1,313 away); Referee: Thomas Bramall

6 December 2023 15	Aston Villa	1–0	Manchester City	Birmingham
20:15 GMT	Watkins (yellow card) 60'; Bailey 74'; Kamara (yellow card) 87'	Report	Stones (yellow card) 45'; Lewis (yellow card) 53'	Stadium: Villa Park; Attendance: 41,421 (3,005 away); Referee: John Brooks
Note: Live on Amazon Prime Video

9 December 2023 16	Aston Villa	1–0	Arsenal	Birmingham
17:30 GMT	McGinn 7', (yellow card) 73'; Digne (yellow card) 53'; Douglas Luiz (yellow card) 62'; Diego Carlos (yellow card) 88'	Report	Zinchenko (yellow card) 28'; Rice (yellow card) 77'	Stadium: Villa Park; Attendance: 42,000 (3,005 away); Referee: Jarred Gillett
Note: Live on Sky Sports

17 December 2023 17	Brentford	1–2	Aston Villa	Brentford
14:00 GMT	Lewis-Potter 45'; Nørgaard (yellow card) 46'; Mee (red card) 71'; Ghoddos (yellow card) 86'; Janelt (yellow card) 88'; Onyeka (yellow card) 90'; Maupay (yellow card) 90+1'; Yarmolyuk (yellow card) 90+8'	Report	Moreno 77'; Bailey (yellow card) 80'; Watkins 85'; Konsa (yellow card) 86'; Durán (yellow card) 87'; Kamara (red card) 90+7'; Martínez (yellow card) 90+8'	Stadium: Brentford Community Stadium; Attendance: 17,034 (1,725 away); Referee: David Coote

22 December 2023 18	Aston Villa	1–1	Sheffield United	Birmingham
20:00 GMT	Bailey (yellow card) 49'; Zaniolo (yellow card) 90+5', (goal) 90+7'; Cash (yellow card) 90+10'	Report	Larouci (yellow card) 51'; Bogle (yellow card) 69'; Archer 87'; Trusty (yellow card) 90+9'	Stadium: Villa Park; Attendance: 41,651 (2,952 away); Referee: Anthony Taylor
Note: Live on Sky Sports

26 December 2023 19	Manchester United	3–2	Aston Villa	Trafford
20:00 GMT	Garnacho 59', 71'; Fernandes (yellow card) 73'; Højlund 82'	Report	McGinn 21'; Dendoncker 26'; Ramsey (yellow card) 45+2'; Diego Carlos (yellow card) 74'; Konsa (yellow card) 87'	Stadium: Old Trafford; Attendance: 73,574 (3,098 away); Referee: Craig Pawson
Note: Live on Amazon Prime Video

30 December 2023 20	Aston Villa	3–2	Burnley	Birmingham
15:00 GMT	Konsa (yellow card) 18'; Bailey 28'; Diaby 42'; Ramsey (yellow card) 88'; Douglas Luiz 89' (pen.); Martínez (yellow card) 90+6'; McGinn (yellow card) 90+8'	Report	Taylor (yellow card) 23'; Amdouni 30'; Berge (yellow card) 42' (yellow-red card) 56'; Foster 71'	Stadium: Villa Park; Attendance: 41,613 (2,314 away); Referee: Stuart Attwell

14 January 2024 21	Everton	0–0	Aston Villa	Liverpool
14:00 GMT	Tarkowski (yellow card) 73'	Report	Watkins (yellow card) 31'; Diego Carlos (yellow card) 48'; Lenglet (yellow card) 73'; Tielemans (yellow card) 75'	Stadium: Goodison Park; Attendance: 39,284 (2,976 away); Referee: David Coote
Note: Live on Sky Sports

30 January 2024 22	Aston Villa	1–3	Newcastle United	Birmingham
20:15 GMT	Kamara (yellow card) 39'; Watkins 71'; Douglas Luiz (yellow card) 72'; McGinn (yellow card) 77'; Zaniolo (yellow card) 90+5'	Report	Schär 32', 36'; Moreno 52' (o.g.); Gordon (yellow card) 90+4'	Stadium: Villa Park; Attendance: 42,191 (3,000 away); Referee: John Brooks
Note: Live on TNT Sports

3 February 2024 23	Sheffield United	0–5	Aston Villa	Sheffield
17:30 GMT	Bogle (yellow card) 44'	Report	McGinn 12'; Watkins 16'; Bailey 20'; Tielemans 30'; Moreno 47'	Stadium: Bramall Lane; Attendance: 28,978 (2,861 away); Referee: Paul Tierney
Note: Live on Sky Sports

11 February 2024 24	Aston Villa	1–2	Manchester United	Birmingham
16:30 GMT	Lenglet (yellow card) 45+5'; Cash (yellow card) 60'; Douglas Luiz 67'; Diaby (yellow card) 71'	Report	Højlund 17'; Casemiro (yellow card) 37'; Mainoo (yellow card) 45+4'; McTominay 86'	Stadium: Villa Park; Attendance: 42,185 (3,016 away); Referee: Robert Jones
Note: Live on Sky Sports

17 February 2024 25	Fulham	1–2	Aston Villa	Fulham
15:00 GMT	Muniz 63'; Palhinha (yellow card) 86'; Castagne (yellow card) 89'; Lukić (yellow card) 90'; Traoré (yellow card) 90+3'; Wilson (yellow card) 90+4'	Report	Watkins 23', 56'; McGinn (yellow card) 32'; Moreno (yellow card) 74'	Stadium: Craven Cottage; Attendance: 24,401 (2,701 away); Referee: Lewis Smith

24 February 2024 26	Aston Villa	4–2	Nottingham Forest	Birmingham
15:00 GMT	Watkins 4'; Douglas Luiz 29', 39'; Moreno (yellow card) 57'; Bailey 61'	Report	Murillo (yellow card) 15'; Felipe (yellow card) 45'; Niakhaté 45+5'; Gibbs-White 48'	Stadium: Villa Park; Attendance: 42,422 (3,006 away); Referee: Sam Barrott

2 March 2024 27	Luton Town	2–3	Aston Villa	Luton
17:30 GMT	Burke (yellow card) 38'; Chong 66'; Morris 72'	Report	Watkins 24', 38'; Douglas Luiz (yellow card) 45'; Bailey (yellow card) 45+5'; Rogers (yellow card) 50'; Digne 89'; Zaniolo (yellow card) 90+2'	Stadium: Kenilworth Road; Attendance: 11,594 (1,358 away); Referee: Michael Oliver
Note: Live on Sky Sports

10 March 2024 28	Aston Villa	0–4	Tottenham Hotspur	Birmingham
13:00 GMT	McGinn (red card) 65'	Report	Sarr (yellow card) 19'; Maddison 50'; Johnson 53'; Drăgușin (yellow card) 61'; Son 90+1'; Werner 90+4'	Stadium: Villa Park; Attendance: 42,310 (3,006 away); Referee: Chris Kavanagh
Note: Live on Sky Sports

17 March 2024 29	West Ham United	1–1	Aston Villa	Stratford
14:00 GMT	Antonio 29'; Álvarez (yellow card) 83'; Kudus (yellow card) 86'; Mavropanos (yellow card) 87'	Report	Tielemans (yellow card) 70'; Zaniolo 79', (yellow card) 83'; Douglas Luiz (yellow card) 86'	Stadium: London Stadium; Attendance: 62,461 (3,001 away); Referee: Jarred Gillett

30 March 2024 30	Aston Villa	2–0	Wolverhampton Wanderers	Birmingham
17:30 GMT	Tielemans (yellow card) 30'; Diaby 36'; Konsa 65'; Durán (yellow card) 84'; Digne (yellow card) 90+6'	Report	Sarabia (yellow card) 19'; Chirewa (yellow card) 81'; Kilman (yellow card) 84'; Toti (yellow card) 90+1'	Stadium: Villa Park; Attendance: 42,640 (2,946 away); Referee: Paul Tierney
Note: Live on Sky Sports

3 April 2024 31	Manchester City	4–1	Aston Villa	Manchester
20:15 BST	Rodri 11'; Grealish (yellow card) 32'; Foden 45+1', 62', 69'	Report	Durán 20'; Douglas Luiz (yellow card) 38'; Chambers (yellow card) 90+4'	Stadium: Etihad Stadium; Attendance: 53,422 (3,065 away); Referee: Darren England
Note: Live on TNT Sports

6 April 2024 32	Aston Villa	3–3	Brentford	Birmingham
15:00 BST	Watkins 39', 80'; Rogers 46'; Diego Carlos (yellow card) 84'; Douglas Luiz (yellow card) 90+7'	Report	Damsgaard (yellow card) 42'; Wissa (yellow card) 53', (goal) 68'; Jørgensen 59'; Mbeumo 61'	Stadium: Villa Park; Attendance: 42,218 (1,598 away); Referee: Michael Salisbury

14 April 2024 33	Arsenal	0–2	Aston Villa	Holloway
16:30 BST	White (yellow card) 36'; Gabriel (yellow card) 45'; Havertz (yellow card) 63'	Report	Rogers (yellow card) 14'; Bailey 84'; Watkins 87'	Stadium: Emirates Stadium; Attendance: 60,350 (3,003 away); Referee: David Coote
Note: Live on Sky Sports

21 April 2024 34	Aston Villa	3–1	Bournemouth	Birmingham
15:00 BST	Rogers 45+1'; Diaby 57'; Bailey 78'; Cash (yellow card) 87'	Report	Smith (yellow card) 21'; Solanke 31' (pen.); Senesi (yellow card) 37'; Zabarnyi (yellow card) 55'	Stadium: Villa Park; Attendance: 42,189 (1,598 away); Referee: Tim Robinson

27 April 2024 35	Aston Villa	2–2	Chelsea	Birmingham
20:00 BST	Cucurella 4' (o.g.); Rogers 42', (yellow card) 64'; Douglas Luiz (yellow card) 49'; Bailey (yellow card) 66'	Report	Caicedo (yellow card) 49'; Madueke 62', (yellow card) 90+10'; Gallagher 81'; Mudryk (yellow card) 82'; Thiago Silva (yellow card) 87'; Badiashile (yellow card) 90+10'	Stadium: Villa Park; Attendance: 42,354 (3,006 away); Referee: Craig Pawson
Note: Live on TNT Sports

5 May 2024 36	Brighton & Hove Albion	1–0	Aston Villa	Falmer
14:00 BST	Groß (yellow card) 49'; Adingra (yellow card) 63'; João Pedro (penalty missed) 87', 87'	Report	Cash (yellow card) 90+9'	Stadium: Falmer Stadium; Attendance: 31,596 (3,000 away); Referee: Robert Jones

13 May 2024 37	Aston Villa	3–3	Liverpool	Birmingham
20:00 BST	Tielemans 12'; McGinn (yellow card) 70'; Durán 85', 88'	Report	Martínez 2' (o.g.); Gakpo 23'; Elliott (yellow card) 38'; Quansah 48'	Stadium: Villa Park; Attendance: 42,241 (3,000 away); Referee: Simon Hooper
Note: Live on Sky Sports

19 May 2024 38	Crystal Palace	5–0	Aston Villa	Selhurst
16:00 BST	Mateta 9', 39', 63'; Andersen (yellow card) 24'; Eze 54', 69'	Report	McGinn (yellow card) 18'; Digne (yellow card) 58'; Douglas Luiz (yellow card) 73'; Lenglet (yellow card) 90+2'	Stadium: Selhurst Park; Attendance: 25,191 (2,687 away); Referee: Darren Bond

=== FA Cup ===
Aston Villa entered the FA Cup in the third round, and were drawn away to EFL Championship club Middlesbrough. They were then drawn away to fellow Premier League club Chelsea in the fourth round.

Win Draw Loss Fixtures

6 January 2024 Third round	Middlesbrough	0–1	Aston Villa	Middlesbrough
17:30 GMT	Jones (yellow card) 23'	Report	Konsa (yellow card) 37'; Bailey (yellow card) 40'; Cash (yellow card) 74', (goal) 87'; Zaniolo (yellow card) 80'; Lenglet (yellow card) 82'	Stadium: Riverside Stadium; Attendance: 25,022 (4,960 away); Referee: Robert Jones
Note: Live on BBC Sport

26 January 2024 Fourth round	Chelsea	0–0	Aston Villa	Fulham
19:45 GMT	Thiago Silva (yellow card) 9'	Report	Tielemans (yellow card) 46'	Stadium: Stamford Bridge; Attendance: 39,325 (6,000); Referee: Robert Jones

7 February 2024 Fourth round replay	Aston Villa	1–3	Chelsea	Birmingham
20:00 GMT	Diego Carlos (yellow card) 38'; Diaby 90+1'	Report	Gallagher 11'; Jackson 21'; Fernández 54', (yellow card) 55'; Petrović (yellow card) 76'	Stadium: Villa Park; Attendance: 40,013; Referee: Thomas Bramall
Note: Live on ITV Sport

=== EFL Cup ===
Villa entered the competition in the third round, and were drawn at home to Everton.

Win Draw Loss Fixtures

27 September 2023 Third round	Aston Villa	1–2	Everton	Birmingham
19:45 BST	Watkins (yellow card) 46'; Digne (yellow card) 74'; Konsa (yellow card) 79'; Kamara 83'; Douglas Luiz (yellow card) 90+4'	Report	Garner 15'; Patterson (yellow card) 48'; Calvert-Lewin 50'; Tarkowski (yellow card) 66'; McNeil (yellow card) 90+4'	Stadium: Villa Park; Attendance: 23,851; Referee: Tony Harrington

=== UEFA Europa Conference League ===
Aston Villa entered the UEFA Europa Conference League in the play-off qualification round; the draw took place on 7 August 2023.

Win Draw Loss Fixtures

==== Play-off round ====
23 August 2023 First leg	Hibernian (Scotland)	0–5	(England) Aston Villa	Edinburgh, Scotland
17:45 BST	Boyle (yellow card) 90+1'	Report	Watkins 17', 33', 48'; Digne (yellow card) 21'; Bailey 42'; Douglas Luiz 74' (pen.)	Stadium: Easter Road; Attendance: 19,306 (1,078 away); Referee: Ricardo de Burgos Bengoetxea (Spain)
Note: Live on BBC Scotland

31 August 2023 Second leg	Aston Villa (England)	3–0 (8–0 agg.)	(Scotland) Hibernian	Birmingham, England
20:00 BST	Durán 11'; Bailey 34'; Cash 61'	Report	Miller (yellow card) 69'	Stadium: Villa Park; Attendance: 39,467; Referee: Luca Pairetto (Italy)

==== Group stage ====
On 1 September 2023, the draw took place for the UEFA Europa League group stage. Aston Villa were drawn in Group E, alongside AZ Alkmaar, Legia Warsaw and Zrinjski Mostar. The fixture list was confirmed the following morning.

Pos	Team	Pld	W	D	L	GF	GA	GD	Pts	Qualification	AVL	LEG	AZ	ZRI
1	(England) Aston Villa	6	4	1	1	12	7	+5	13	Advance to round of 16	—	2–1	2–1	1–0
2	(Poland) Legia Warsaw	6	4	0	2	10	6	+4	12	Advance to knockout round play-offs	3–2	—	2–0	2–0
3	(Netherlands) AZ	6	2	0	4	7	12	−5	6		1–4	1–0	—	1–0
4	(Bosnia and Herzegovina) Zrinjski Mostar	6	1	1	4	6	10	−4	4		1–1	1–2	4–3	—

Source: UEFA
Rules for classification: Group stage tiebreakers

21 September 2023 1	Legia Warsaw (Poland)	3–2	(England) Aston Villa	Warsaw, Poland
18:45 CEST (17:45 BST)	Wszołek 3'; Kun (yellow card) 19'; Muçi 26', 51'; Ribeiro (yellow card) 84'; Tobiasz (yellow card) 90+4'	Report	Durán 6'; Digne 39'; Zaniolo (yellow card) 53'; Diaby (yellow card) 71'	Stadium: Stadion Wojska Polskiego; Attendance: 27,801 (1,703 away); Referee: Evangelos Manouchos (Greece)

5 October 2023 2	Aston Villa (England)	1–0	(Bosnia and Herzegovina) Zrinjski Mostar	Birmingham, England
20:00 BST	McGinn (yellow card) 24', (goal) 90+4'; Cash (yellow card) 64'	Report	Hrvanović (yellow card) 22'; Bilbija (yellow card) 64'	Stadium: Villa Park; Attendance: 37,327; Referee: Urs Schnyder (Switzerland)

26 October 2023 3	AZ (Netherlands)	1–4	(England) Aston Villa	Alkmaar, Netherlands
18:45 CEST (17:45 BST)	Mijnans (yellow card) 19'; Clasie (yellow card) 44'; Sadiq 65'; Bazoer (yellow card) 90'	Report	Bailey 13', (yellow card) 86'; Tielemans 23'; Lenglet (yellow card) 45+1'; Watkins 51'; McGinn 56'	Stadium: AFAS Stadion; Attendance: 19,478 (950 away); Referee: Sven Jablonski (Germany)

9 November 2023 4	Aston Villa (England)	2–1	(Netherlands) AZ	Birmingham, England
20:00 GMT	Diego Carlos 61'; Watkins 81'	Report	Pavaldis 52'	Stadium: Villa Park; Attendance: 40,000; Referee: Luis Godinho (Portugal)

30 November 2023 5	Aston Villa (England)	2–1	(Poland) Legia Warsaw	Birmingham, England
20:00 GMT	Diaby 4', (yellow card) 36'; Douglas Luiz (yellow card) 41'; Tielemans (yellow card) 53'; Moreno 58'; Durán (yellow card) 90+2'	Report	Muçi 20'; Gual (yellow card) 39'; Wszołek (yellow card) 41'; Kramer (yellow card) 68'; Jędrzejczyk (yellow card) 75'	Stadium: Villa Park; Attendance: 37,866; Referee: Marco Di Bello (Italy)

14 December 2023 6	Zrinjski Mostar (Bosnia and Herzegovina)	1–1	(England) Aston Villa	Mostar, Bosnia and Herzegovina
18:45 CET (17:45 GMT)	Čanađija (yellow card) 3'; Malekinušić 87', (yellow card) 88'	Report	Zaniolo (yellow card) 37', (goal) 61'; McGinn (yellow card) 84'	Stadium: Stadion pod Bijelim Brijegom; Attendance: 6,610 (490 away); Referee: Balázs Berke (Hungary)

==== Knockout phase ====
===== Round of 16 =====
The draw for the round of 16 took place on 23 February 2024.

7 March 2024 First leg	Ajax (Netherlands)	0–0	(England) Aston Villa	Amsterdam, Netherlands
18:45 CET	Mannsverk (yellow card) 24'; Gooijer (yellow card) 68' (yellow-red card) 86'	Report	Konsa (yellow card) 26' (yellow-red card) 83'; Cash (yellow card) 64'; Zaniolo (yellow card) 76'	Stadium: Johan Cruyff Arena; Attendance: 52,197 (2,600 away); Referee: Enea Jorgji (Albania)

14 March 2024 Second leg	Aston Villa (England)	4–0 (4–0 agg.)	(Netherlands) Ajax	Birmingham, England
20:00 GMT	Rogers (yellow card) 11'; Watkins (yellow card) 19', (goal) 25'; Bailey 60'; Durán 75'; Diaby 81'	Report	Mannsverk (yellow card) 14' (yellow-red card) 66'	Stadium: Villa Park; Attendance: 37,916; Referee: Orel Grinfeld (Israel)

===== Quarter-finals =====
The draw for the quarter-finals took place on 15 March 2024.

11 April 2024 First leg	Aston Villa (England)	2–1	(France) Lille	Birmingham, England
20:00 BST	Watkins 13'; Douglas Luiz (yellow card) 50'; McGinn 56'; Tielemans (yellow card) 77'; Martínez (yellow card) 90+4'	Report	Diakité 84'	Stadium: Villa Park; Attendance: 37,220; Referee: Espen Eskås (Norway)

18 April 2024 Second leg	Lille (France)	2–1 (a.e.t.) (3–3 agg.) (3–4 p)	(England) Aston Villa	Villeneuve-d'Ascq, France
18:45 CEST	Yazıcı 15'; Bentaleb (yellow card) 42'; André (yellow card) 44', (goal) 68'; Santos (yellow card) 61'; Gomes (yellow card) 117'	Report	Zaniolo (yellow card) 21'; Martínez (yellow card) 39' (yellow card) PSO; Digne (yellow card) 61'; Rogers (yellow card) 76'; Cash 87'; Durán (yellow card) 90+1'; Watkins (yellow card) 109'	Stadium: Stade Pierre-Mauroy; Attendance: 47,093 (2,599 away); Referee: Ivan Kružliak (Slovakia)
	Penalties
	Bentaleb (penalty missed); David (penalty scored); Gomes (penalty scored); Cabella (penalty scored); André (penalty missed)		(penalty scored) Tielemans; (penalty scored) Watkins; (penalty scored) Cash; (penalty missed) Bailey; (penalty scored) Douglas Luiz

===== Semi-finals =====
The draw for the semi-finals took place on 15 March 2024, after the draw for the quarter-finals.

2 May 2024 First leg	Aston Villa (England)	2–4	(Greece) Olympiacos	Birmingham, England
20:00 BST	Watkins 45+1'; Diaby 52', (yellow card) 83'; Douglas Luiz (penalty missed) 84'	Report	El Kaabi 16', 29', 56' (pen.); Hezze 67'; Fortounis (yellow card) 84'	Stadium: Villa Park; Attendance: 41,220; Referee: Marco Guida (Italy)

9 May 2024 Second leg	Olympiacos (Greece)	2–0 (6–2 agg.)	(England) Aston Villa	Piraeus, Greece
22:00 EEST	El Kaabi 10', 78'; Rodinei (yellow card) 31'; Podence (yellow card) 53'; Quini (yellow card) 68'	Report	Douglas Luiz (yellow card) 45+5'; Iroegbunam (yellow card) 73'; Durán (yellow card) 89'	Stadium: Karaiskakis Stadium; Attendance: 33,000 (1,600 away); Referee: Felix Zwayer (Germany)

== Squad statistics ==
As of match played 19 May 2024

=== Appearances ===
No.	Pos.	Nat.	Player	Premier League		FA Cup		EFL Cup		Europa Conference League		Total	
No.	Pos.	Nat.	Player	Apps	Starts	Apps	Starts	Apps	Starts	Apps	Starts	Apps	Starts
1	GK	(Argentina)	Emiliano Martínez	34	34	3	3	0	0	10	10	47	47
2	DF	(Poland)	Matty Cash	29	23	3	3	1	1	13	7	46	34
3	DF	(Brazil)	Diego Carlos	27	20	2	1	0	0	9	7	38	28
4	DF	(England)	Ezri Konsa	35	35	2	2	1	1	12	12	50	50
5	DF	(England)	Tyrone Mings	1	1	0	0	0	0	0	0	1	1
6	MF	(Brazil)	Douglas Luiz	35	35	3	2	1	1	14	11	53	49
7	MF	(Scotland)	John McGinn	35	35	3	3	1	1	14	12	53	51
8	MF	(Belgium)	Youri Tielemans	32	17	2	2	1	1	11	9	46	29
9	FW	(Burkina Faso)	Bertrand Traoré	2	0	0	0	0	0	4	0	6	0
10	MF	(Argentina)	Emiliano Buendía	0	0	0	0	0	0	0	0	0	0
11	FW	(England)	Ollie Watkins	37	37	3	2	1	0	12	9	53	48
12	DF	(France)	Lucas Digne	33	27	0	0	1	0	12	10	46	37
14	DF	(Spain)	Pau Torres	29	27	0	0	1	1	9	8	39	36
15	DF	(Spain)	Àlex Moreno	21	11	3	3	0	0	5	3	29	17
16	DF	(England)	Calum Chambers	5	1	0	0	0	0	3	2	8	3
17	DF	(France)	Clément Lenglet	14	14	3	3	0	0	8	7	25	24
18	GK	(Australia)	Joe Gauci	0	0	0	0	0	0	0	0	0	0
19	FW	(France)	Moussa Diaby	38	25	3	1	1	1	12	9	54	36
22	MF	(Italy)	Nicolò Zaniolo	25	9	3	0	1	0	10	4	39	13
23	MF	(Brazil)	Philippe Coutinho	2	0	0	0	0	0	0	0	2	0
24	FW	(Colombia)	Jhon Durán	23	3	1	1	1	1	12	5	37	10
25	GK	(Sweden)	Robin Olsen	5	4	0	0	1	0	4	3	10	8
27	FW	(England)	Morgan Rogers	11	8	0	0	0	0	5	4	16	12
29	DF	(England)	Kaine Kesler-Hayden	3	0	0	0	0	0	1	0	4	0
30	DF	(England)	Kortney Hause	0	0	0	0	0	0	0	0	0	0
31	FW	(Jamaica)	Leon Bailey	35	22	3	2	1	1	13	10	52	35
32	MF	(Belgium)	Leander Dendoncker	8	1	1	1	1	1	3	2	15	5
33	FW	(England)	Jaden Philogene	1	0	0	0	0	0	0	0	1	0
35	FW	(England)	Cameron Archer	1	0	0	0	0	0	0	0	1	0
41	MF	(England)	Jacob Ramsey	16	8	2	1	0	0	3	1	21	10
42	GK	(England)	Filip Marschall	0	0	0	0	0	0	1	0	1	0
44	MF	(France)	Boubacar Kamara	20	20	3	3	1	0	6	6	30	29
47	MF	(England)	Tim Iroegbunam	9	1	1	0	0	0	5	1	15	2
50	DF	(Netherlands)	Sil Swinkels	0	0	0	0	0	0	0	0	0	0
56	DF	(England)	Sebastian Revan	0	0	0	0	0	0	1	1	1	1
57	FW	(Bermuda)	Ajani Burchall	0	0	0	0	0	0	0	0	0	0
58	MF	(England)	Tommi O'Reilly	0	0	0	0	0	0	1	0	1	0
65	FW	(Scotland)	Rory Wilson	0	0	0	0	0	0	0	0	0	0
69	DF	(England)	Finley Munroe	1	0	0	0	0	0	1	0	2	0
71	FW	(England)	Omari Kellyman	2	0	0	0	1	0	3	1	6	1
72	FW	(England)	Kadan Young	0	0	0	0	0	0	0	0	0	0
Total				38		3		1		14		56	

=== Goals ===
As of match played 19 May 2024

Rank	Pos.	No.	Player	Premier League	FA Cup	EFL Cup	Europa Conference League	Total
1	CF	11	(England) Ollie Watkins	19	0	0	8	27
2	RW	31	(Jamaica) Leon Bailey	10	0	0	4	14
3	CM	6	(Brazil) Douglas Luiz	9	0	0	1	10
3	RW	19	(France) Moussa Diaby	6	1	0	3	10
5	CM	7	(Scotland) John McGinn	6	0	0	3	9
6	CF	24	(Colombia) Jhon Durán	5	0	0	3	8
7	RB	2	(Poland) Matty Cash	2	1	0	2	5
8	CM	8	(Belgium) Youri Tielemans	2	0	0	1	3
8	LB	15	(Spain) Àlex Moreno	2	0	0	1	3
8	AM	22	(Italy) Nicolò Zaniolo	2	0	0	1	3
8	LW	27	(England) Morgan Rogers	3	0	0	0	3
11	LB	12	(France) Lucas Digne	1	0	0	1	2
11	CB	14	(Spain) Pau Torres	2	0	0	0	2
14	CB	3	(Brazil) Diego Carlos	0	0	0	1	1
14	CB	4	(England) Ezri Konsa	1	0	0	0	1
14	CDM	32	(Belgium) Leander Dendoncker	1	0	0	0	1
14	CM	41	(England) Jacob Ramsey	1	0	0	0	1
14	CDM	44	(France) Boubacar Kamara	0	0	1	0	1
Own goals				4	0	0	0	4
Totals				73	2	1	29	105

=== Assists ===
Not all goals have an assist.

As of match played 19 May 2024

=== Clean sheets ===
As of match played 19 May 2024

Rank	No.	Player	Premier League	FA Cup	EFL Cup	Europa Conference League	Total
1	1	(Argentina) Emiliano Martínez	7	2	0	3	12
2	25	(Sweden) Robin Olsen	0	0	0	2	2
Totals			7	2	0	5	14

=== Disciplinary record ===
As of match played 19 May 2024

Rank	Pos.	No.	Player	Premier League		FA Cup		EFL Cup		Europa Conference League		Total	
Rank	Pos.	No.	Player	Yellow card	Red card	Yellow card	Red card	Yellow card	Red card	Yellow card	Red card	Yellow card	Red card
1	CM	7	(Scotland) John McGinn	9	1	0	0	0	0	2	0	11	1
2	CB	4	(England) Ezri Konsa	5	0	1	0	1	0	1	1	8	1
3	CDM	44	(France) Boubacar Kamara	7	1	0	0	0	0	0	0	7	1
4	CM	6	(Brazil) Douglas Luiz	12	0	0	0	1	0	3	0	16	0
5	AM	22	(Italy) Nicolò Zaniolo	7	0	1	0	0	0	4	0	12	0
6	RB	2	(Poland) Matty Cash	8	0	1	0	0	0	2	0	11	0
7	LB	12	(France) Lucas Digne	7	0	0	0	1	0	2	0	10	0
8	CF	24	(Colombia) Jhon Durán	5	0	0	0	0	0	3	0	8	0
9	GK	1	(Argentina) Emiliano Martínez	4	0	0	0	0	0	3	0	7	0
9	CF	11	(England) Ollie Watkins	4	0	0	0	1	0	2	0	7	0
11	CM	8	(Belgium) Youri Tielemans	3	0	1	0	0	0	2	0	6	0
11	RW	31	(Jamaica) Leon Bailey	5	0	1	0	0	0	0	0	6	0
13	CB	3	(Brazil) Diego Carlos	4	0	1	0	0	0	0	0	5	0
13	CB	17	(France) Clément Lenglet	3	0	1	0	0	0	1	0	5	0
13	LW	27	(England) Morgan Rogers	3	0	0	0	0	0	2	0	5	0
15	RW	19	(France) Moussa Diaby	1	0	0	0	0	0	3	0	4	0
17	LB	15	(Spain) Àlex Moreno	2	0	0	0	0	0	0	0	2	0
17	CM	41	(England) Jacob Ramsey	2	0	0	0	0	0	0	0	2	0
19	CB	14	(Spain) Pau Torres	1	0	0	0	0	0	0	0	1	0
19	CB	16	(England) Calum Chambers	1	0	0	0	0	0	0	0	1	0
19	CF	35	(England) Cameron Archer	1	0	0	0	0	0	0	0	1	0
19	CM	47	(England) Tim Iroegbunam	0	0	0	0	0	0	1	0	1	0
Totals				93	2	7	0	4	0	35	1	139	3

== Club awards ==
=== Player of the Month award ===
Voted for by fans on Aston Villa's official website.

Month	Player
August	(France) Moussa Diaby
September	(England) Ollie Watkins
October	(Brazil) Douglas Luiz
November	(England) Ollie Watkins
December	(Jamaica) Leon Bailey
January	(Argentina) Emiliano Martínez
February	(Jamaica) Leon Bailey
March	(France) Moussa Diaby
April	(England) Morgan Rogers
May	(Colombia) Jhon Durán

=== Goal of the Month award ===
Voted for by fans on Aston Villa's X account.

Month	Player	Competition	Opponent
August	(Poland) Matty Cash	Premier League	Burnley
September	(Colombia) Jhon Durán	Premier League	Crystal Palace
October	(England) Ollie Watkins	Premier League	West Ham United
November	(Scotland) John McGinn	Premier League	Fulham
December	(Scotland) John McGinn	Premier League	Arsenal
January	Not awarded		
February	(Brazil) Douglas Luiz	Premier League	Nottingham Forest
March	(Colombia) Jhon Durán	UEFA Europa Conference League	Ajax
April	(England) Ollie Watkins	Premier League	Arsenal
May	Not awarded		

=== Total Monthly Awards ===
Name	Awards
(England) Ollie Watkins	4
(Colombia) Jhon Durán	3
(Brazil) Douglas Luiz	2
(Scotland) John McGinn	2
(France) Moussa Diaby	2
(Jamaica) Leon Bailey	2
(Argentina) Emiliano Martínez	1
(Poland) Matty Cash	1
(England) Morgan Rogers	1

=== End of Season awards ===
Award	Winner
Supporter's Player of the Season	(England) Ollie Watkins
Player's Player of the Season	(England) Ollie Watkins
Goal of the Season	(Colombia) Jhon Durán vs. Crystal Palace
