= Chisom Afoka =

English footballer

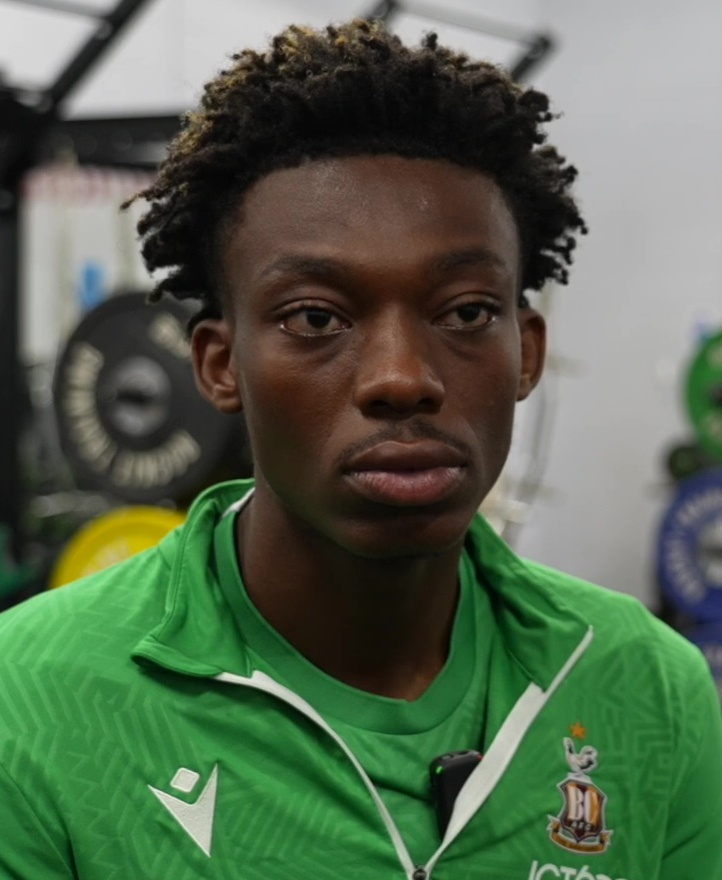
- Afoka with Bradford City in 2023

Personal information
- Full name: Chisom Kenneth Afoka
- Date of birth: 23 September 2003 (age 23)
- Place of birth: Kaduna, Nigeria
- Height: 1.85 m (6 ft 1 in)
- Positions: Attacking midfielder; left winger

Team information
- Current team: Stourbridge

Youth career
- –2020: West Bromwich Albion
- 2020–2023: Aston Villa

Senior career*
Years	Team	Apps	(Gls)
2023–2024	Aston Villa	0	(0)
2023–2024	→ Bradford City (loan)	2	(0)
2025–	Stourbridge	1	(1)
- * Club domestic league appearances and goals as of 00:54, 19 February 2026

Chisom Kenneth Afoka (born 23 September 2003) is a professional footballer who plays as an attacking midfielder or left winger, for Stourbridge. Afoka is a product of the West Bromwich Albion and Aston Villa academies. He previously played for Bradford City on loan in the 2023-24 season.

== Club career ==
Afoka joined Aston Villa from the West Bromwich Albion academy in July 2020. He started in the Under-18 team, before being promoted to the Under-21 team in the 2022/23 season, scoring 5 goals in 17 games.

On 1 September 2023, Afoka signed for League Two club Bradford City on a season-long loan. On 9 September, Afoka made his professional debut as a substitute in a 1–1 draw against Grimsby Town. On 3 January 2024, Afoka returned to Aston Villa after making only 5 appearances in the first half of the season, none since manager Graham Alexander had taken over.

On 5 June 2024, it was announced that Afoka would be released by Aston Villa upon expiry of his contract on 30 June.

In September 2024, Afoka had a trial with Hull City. Afoka signed for Stourbridge in late 2025 and scored on his Southern League Premier Division Central debut in January 2026.

== Personal life ==
Born in England, Afoka is of Nigerian descent. He attended St Edmund Campion Catholic School in Erdington, Birmingham.

== Career statistics ==
=== Club ===
As of 31 October 2023

Appearances and goals by club, season and competition
Club	Season	League			FA Cup		EFL Cup		Other		Total	
Club	Season	Division	Apps	Goals	Apps	Goals	Apps	Goals	Apps	Goals	Apps	Goals
Aston Villa U21	2022–23	—			—		—		2 (Note: Appearances in the EFL Trophy)	0	2	0
Aston Villa	2023–24	Premier League	0	0	0	0	0	0	0	0	0	0
Bradford City (loan)	2023–24	League Two	2	0	0	0	1	0	2	0	5	0
Career total			2	0	0	0	1	0	4	0	7	0
