= Moussa Diaby =

French footballer (born 1999)

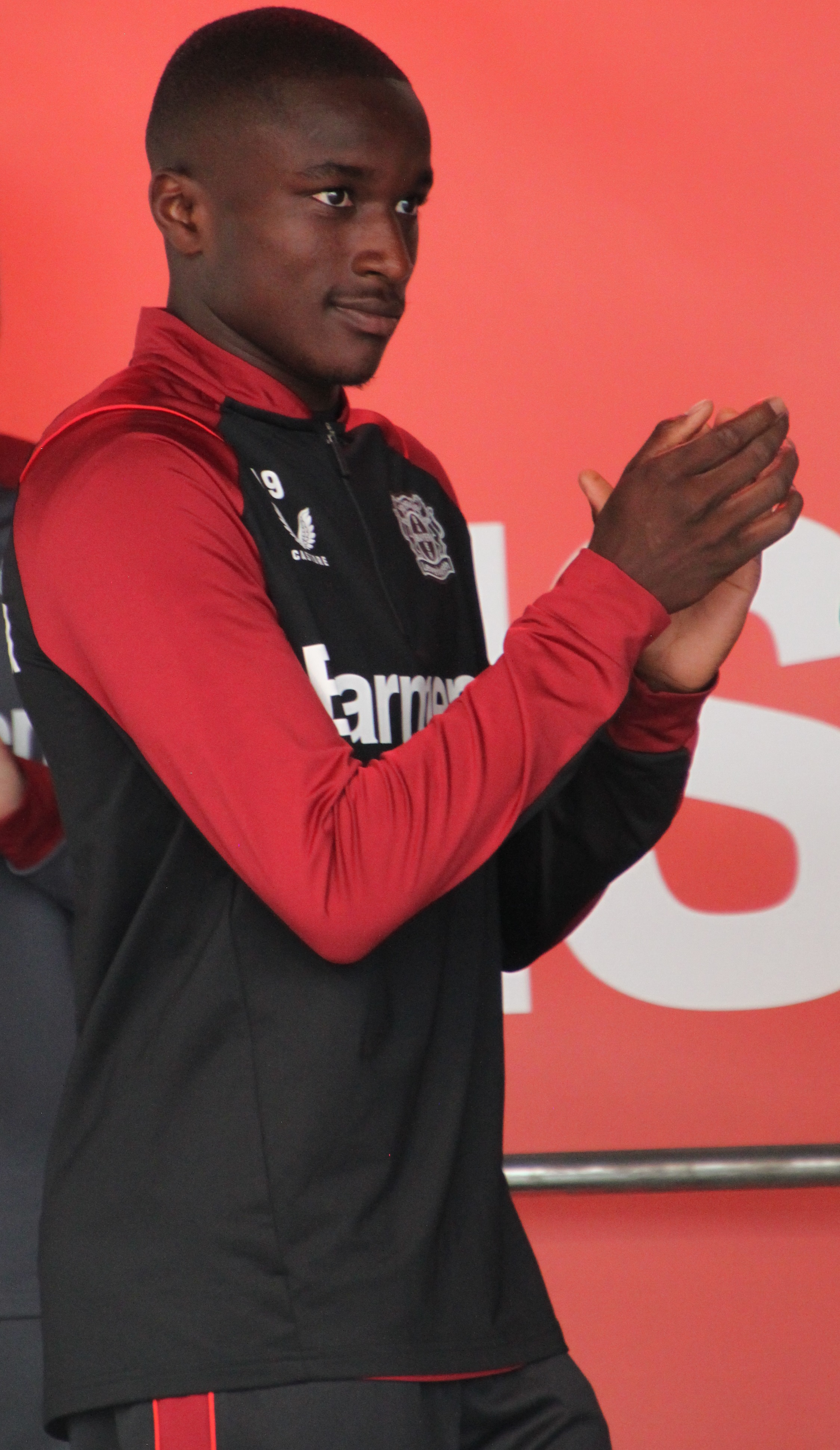
- Diaby with Bayer Leverkusen in 2022

Personal information
- Full name: Moussa Diaby
- Date of birth: 7 July 1999 (age 27)
- Place of birth: Paris, France
- Height: 1.70 m (5 ft 7 in)
- Positions: Winger; wide midfielder

Team information
- Current team: Bayer Leverkusen
- Number: 19

Youth career
- 2009–2013: Espérance Paris 19e
- 2013–2017: Paris Saint-Germain

Senior career*
Years	Team	Apps	(Gls)
2017	Paris Saint-Germain B	14	(2)
2018–2019	Paris Saint-Germain	25	(2)
2018	→ Crotone (loan)	2	(0)
2019–2023	Bayer Leverkusen	125	(31)
2023–2024	Aston Villa	38	(6)
2024–2026	Al-Ittihad	56	(9)
2026–	Bayer Leverkusen	6	(1)

International career^{‡}
2016–2017	France U18	11	(2)
2017–2018	France U19	16	(5)
2018–2019	France U20	10	(7)
2019–2021	France U21	12	(0)
2021–2024	France	11	(0)
Medal record
Men's football
Representing France
UEFA Nations League
Winner	2021 Italy
- * Club domestic league appearances and goals as of 17:30, 25 October 2026 (UTC) ‡ National team caps and goals as of 26 March 2024

Moussa Diaby (born 7 July 1999) is a French professional footballer who plays as a winger or wide midfielder for Bundesliga club Bayer Leverkusen.

== Early life ==
Coming from a Malian family, Moussa Diaby began playing football at Espérance Paris in the 19th arrondissement, at the Jules-Ladoumègue sports center in the under-10 category, where he remained until the under-14 level. The club president, Morade Djeddi, recalled in September 2021:

His skills have been evident since he was a child. He was already dynamic, tenacious, and skillful... he was just exceptional. His small size didn't matter, we promoted him to higher age groups, especially for cup matches.

He played alongside future professional footballers such as Youssouf Fofana and Yahia Fofana.

Spotted by several professional clubs, including Paris Saint-Germain, he joined the latter at the age of 13. His small stature initially made it difficult for him to stand out in the lower categories, and he started with the Division d'Honneur team in the under-17 category. Promoted later to the national under-17 team, he became the French champion in this category in 2016. Continuing his good performances the following season, especially in the UEFA Youth League, he was voted Titi d'Or by his training center teammates.

== Club career ==
=== Paris Saint-Germain ===
Diaby is a product of the Paris Saint-Germain Academy. He joined the club when he was 13 and began playing for the B team in 2017. Diaby was the recipient of the 2016 Titi d'Or as the most promising and best talent in the Paris Saint-Germain academy.

In September 2017, at the age of 18, Diaby signed his first professional contract for three years with Paris Saint-Germain.

==== Loan to Crotone ====
Not used by PSG head coach Unai Emery in the first half of the season and suspended for eight matches due to a foul play in a match for the Under-19 national league, Diaby resolved to be loaned to Crotone in Serie A during the winter break. He scored a goal and provided an assist in his first match with the reserve team. Present on the bench for the first team in the following weeks, he made his professional debut on 14 April against Genoa, coming on with eight minutes remaining. Four days later, he started against Juventus. After a good performance, he did not appear in the last matches of the season.

==== Return to PSG ====
Missing part of the preparation due to the 2018 UEFA European Under-19 Championship, Diaby rejoined Paris Saint-Germain during the summer tour. This gave him the opportunity to play his first matches with the professional team, scoring his first goal in a friendly against Atlético Madrid and winning the 2018 Trophée des Champions, although he did not play in the match. Initially, a new loan to Montpellier or Real Sociedad was considered, but the new Parisian coach Thomas Tuchel decided to keep Diaby at the club.

On 14 September 2018, Diaby, who replaced Lassana Diarra at halftime, scored for PSG in the 86th minute in a 4–0 win over AS Saint-Étienne. He became the 124th academy graduate to feature for the senior side.

Diaby went on to make 25 Ligue 1 appearances in 2018–19, scoring four times across all competitions and averaging an assist every 190 minutes during the club's successful title defence.

=== Bayer Leverkusen ===
In June 2019, Diaby was transferred to Bayer Leverkusen for 15 million euros excluding bonuses and a resale percentage (20%) for Paris Saint-Germain. After five substitute appearances, the international hopeful played his first match as a starter against SC Freiburg in November, where he shone with his speed and scored his first goal in Germany during a 1–1 draw. From then on, he became a regular starter in Peter Bosz's team. Ultimately, Diaby scored five goals and provided as many assists during the 2019–20 season, which ended with a fifth-place finish in the Bundesliga. Scoring eight goals and providing as many assists in all competitions, Diaby was even voted player of the season by the fans with 26.9% of the votes, ahead of the squad's star Kai Havertz. During the summer of 2020, several offers were rejected by the German club's management. At the end of 2020, already under contract until 2024, Diaby extended his contract for an additional season with a salary increase. Since 20 November 2019, the international hopeful had not missed any matches in the Bundesliga. Since his arrival in North Rhine-Westphalia, he had accumulated thirteen goals and fourteen assists. The most used player by Peter Bosz in the first half of the 2020–21 season, Diaby had at that point scored four goals, including three in the Europa League, and five assists, placing him among the most decisive players for Leverkusen, who were leaders of the Bundesliga.

By the end of January 2021, Diaby had three goals and four assists in seventeen league starts, as well as a brace in a 4–1 win over Eintracht Frankfurt in the DFB-Pokal. He also helped defeat Borussia Dortmund by a score of 2–1 with a goal and an assist. By mid-April, his team was no longer in the title race but was competing for qualification for European competition, and Diaby contributed with an assist and a goal in a 3–0 win against 1. FC Köln. In all competitions, he scored ten goals and provided thirteen assists.

At the beginning of September 2021, at the time of his first selection for the France national team, Diaby was directly involved in 44 goals (20 goals, 24 assists) in 85 appearances for Leverkusen across all competitions, averaging more than one contribution every two matches. A month later, having been called up for the French team for the second consecutive time, he had three goals and one assist in nine matches for Leverkusen at the start of the 2021–22 season.

=== Aston Villa ===
On 22 July 2023, Diaby joined Premier League club Aston Villa for an undisclosed fee, rejecting a move to the Saudi Pro League, which was reported to be a club-record £51.9 million reuniting with former PSG manager Unai Emery. On 27 July, Diaby scored minutes after coming on as a substitute in a 2–0 pre-season victory over Fulham in the Premier League Summer Series in the United States. On 12 August, he scored a goal on his Premier League debut in a 5–1 away defeat against Newcastle United.

A goal that Diaby scored on 30 March 2024, in a 2–0 victory over Wolverhampton Wanderers, was given the Premier League Most Powerful Goal award, after being calculated by Opta to have been traveling at 109.84 km/h at the time it reached the goal – faster than any other goal in the Premier League that season.

=== Al-Ittihad ===
On 24 July 2024, after just one season in England, Diaby moved to Saudi Pro League club Al-Ittihad in a deal reportedly worth around €60 million.

=== Return to Bayer Leverkusen ===
On 1 September 2026, Diaby returned to Bundesliga club Bayer Leverkusen for a reported fee of €30 million.

== International career ==
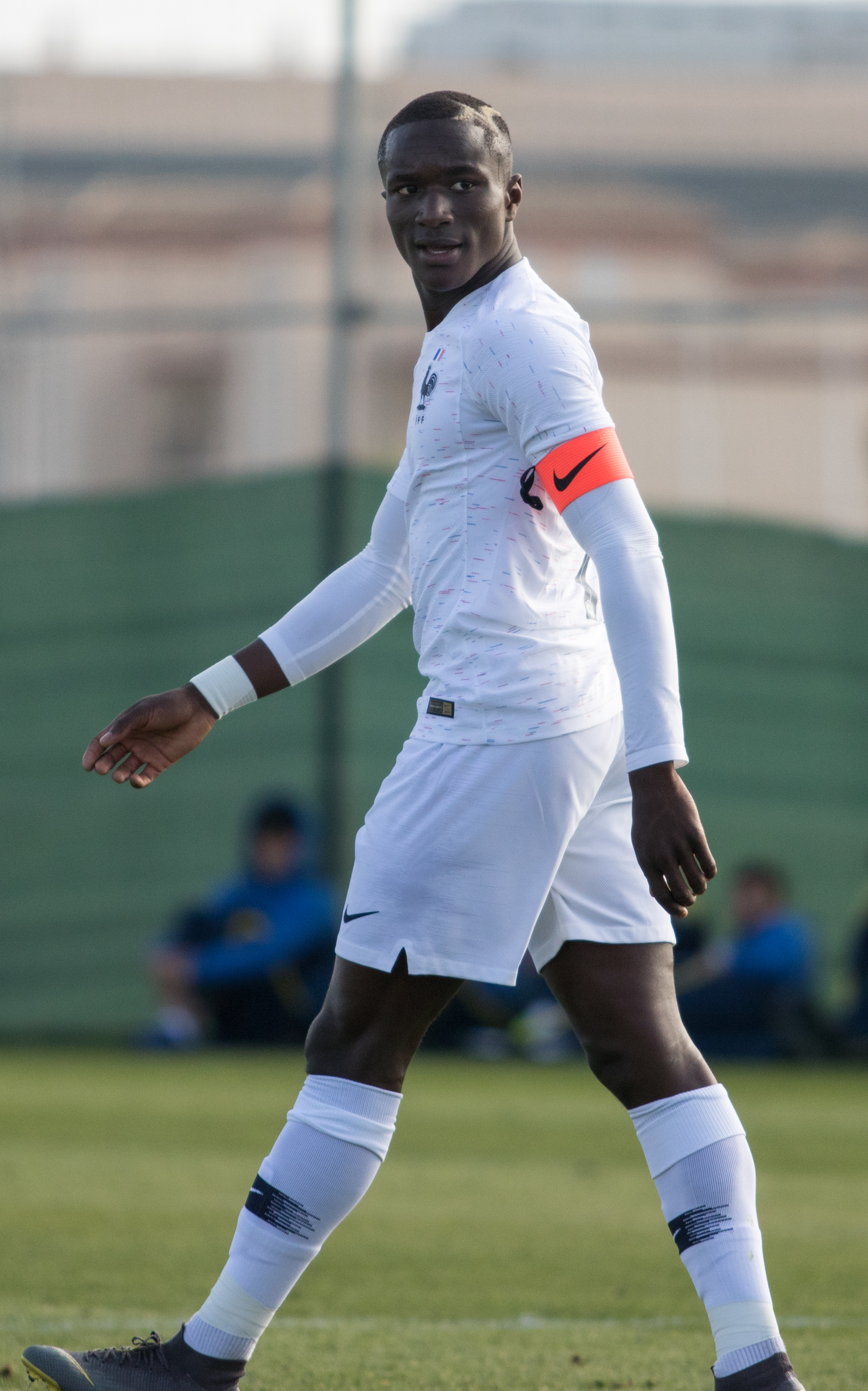
Diaby playing for France U-20

Diaby is a France youth international having represented the country at U18, U19, U20, and U21 levels.

He produced a goal and three assists at the 2018 UEFA European U19 Championship, earning a place in the team of the tournament. The following summer, he scored one goal and assisted two more in four matches at the 2019 FIFA U20 World Cup where France were eliminated at the Round of 16 stage.

On 26 August 2021, he received his first call to France senior squad. He made his international debut on 1 September 2021 in the 2022 FIFA World Cup qualification match against Bosnia and Herzegovina, replacing Kylian Mbappé in the last minute of the match.

== Personal life ==
Diaby was born in Paris to a family of Malian descent. He is a Muslim.

== Career statistics ==
=== Club ===
As of match played 25 October 2026

Appearances and goals by club, season and competition
Club	Season	League			National cup (Note: Includes Coupe de France, DFB-Pokal, FA Cup, King's Cup)		League cup (Note: Includes Coupe de la Ligue, EFL Cup)		Continental		Other		Total	
Club	Season	Division	Apps	Goals	Apps	Goals	Apps	Goals	Apps	Goals	Apps	Goals	Apps	Goals
Paris Saint-Germain	2017–18	Ligue 1	0	0	0	0	0	0	0	0	0	0	0	0
Paris Saint-Germain	2018–19	Ligue 1	25	2	6	1	2	1	1 (Note: Appearance in UEFA Champions League)	0	0	0	34	4
Paris Saint-Germain	Total		25	2	6	1	2	1	1	0	0	0	34	4
Crotone (loan)	2017–18	Serie A	2	0	0	0	—		—		—		2	0
Bayer Leverkusen	2019–20	Bundesliga	28	5	5	2	—		6 (Note: Two appearances in UEFA Champions League, four appearances and one goal in UEFA Europa League)	1	—		39	8
Bayer Leverkusen	2020–21	Bundesliga	32	4	3	2	—		8 (Note: Appearances in UEFA Europa League)	4	—		43	10
Bayer Leverkusen	2021–22	Bundesliga	32	13	2	0	—		8	4	—		42	17
Bayer Leverkusen	2022–23	Bundesliga	33	9	1	0	—		14 (Note: Six appearances and two goals in UEFA Champions League, eight appearances and three goals in UEFA Europa League)	5	—		48	14
Bayer Leverkusen	Total		125	31	11	4	—		36	14	—		172	49
Aston Villa	2023–24	Premier League	38	6	3	1	1	0	12 (Note: Appearances in UEFA Europa Conference League)	3	—		54	10
Al-Ittihad	2024–25	Saudi Pro League	24	5	4	0	—		—		—		28	5
Al-Ittihad	2025–26	Saudi Pro League	31	4	2	1	—		9 (Note: Appearances(s) in AFC Champions League Elite)	1	1 (Note: Appearance in Saudi Super Cup)	0	43	6
Al-Ittihad	2026–27	Saudi Pro League	1	0	0	0	—		1	0	—		2	0
Al-Ittihad	Total		56	9	6	1	—		10	1	1	0	73	11
Bayer Leverkusen	2026–27	Bundesliga	6	1	0	0	—		3	0	—		9	1
Career total			252	49	26	7	3	1	61	18	1	0	344	75

=== International ===
As of match played 26 March 2024

Appearances and goals by national team and year
National team	Year	Apps	Goals
France	2021	4	0
France	2022	4	0
France	2023	2	0
France	2024	1	0
Total		11	0

== Honours ==
Paris Saint-Germain

- Ligue 1: 2018–19
- Trophée des Champions: 2018
- Coupe de France runner-up: 2018–19

Al-Ittihad

- Saudi Pro League: 2024–25
- King's Cup: 2024–25

France

- UEFA Nations League: 2020–21

Individual

- Titi d'Or: 2016
- UEFA European Under-19 Championship Team of the Tournament: 2018
- Bundesliga Team of the Season: 2022–23
- Premier League Most Powerful Goal: 2023–24
- Saudi Pro League Player of the Month: October 2024
