= Ezri Konsa =

English footballer (born 1997)

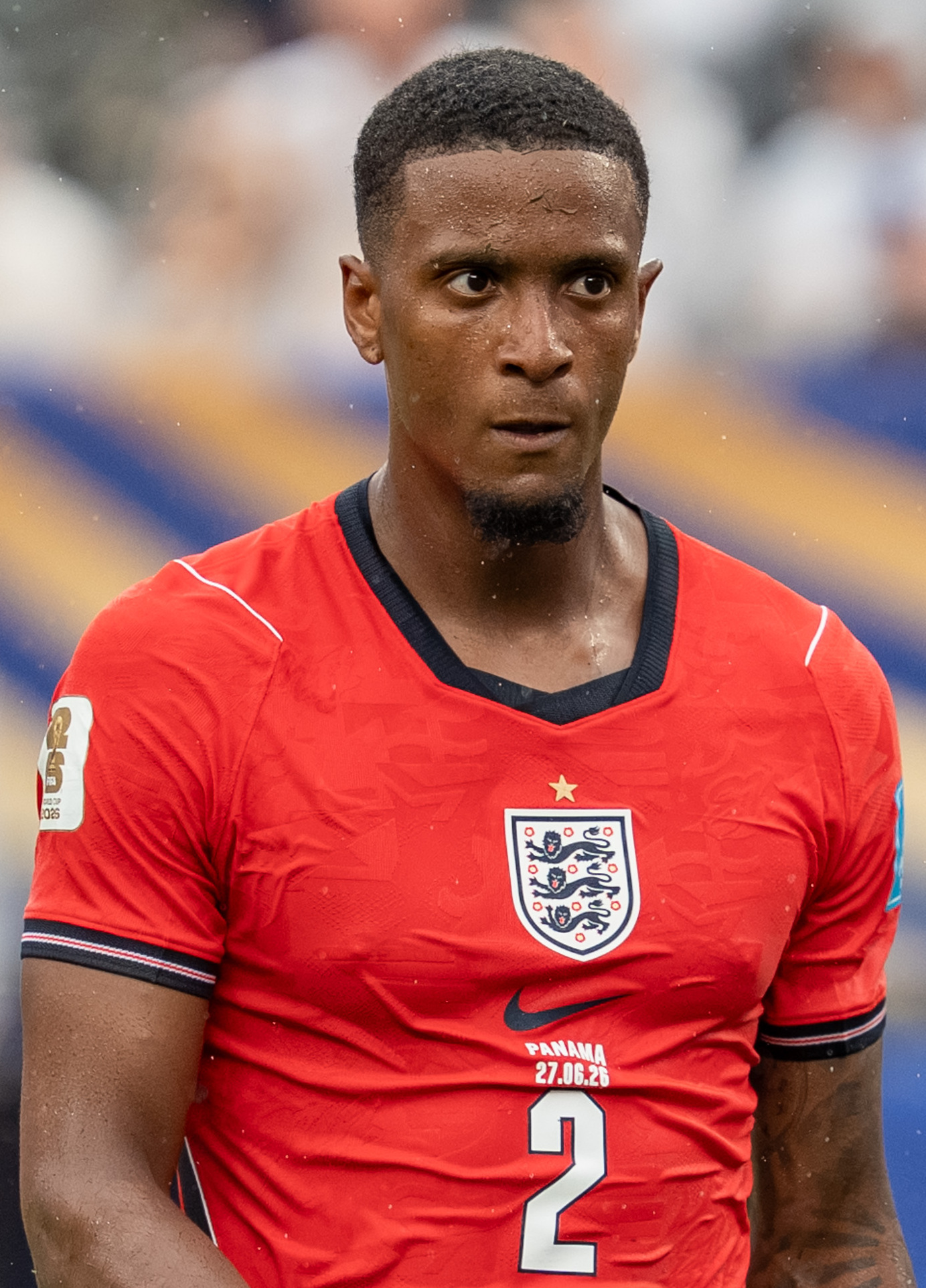
- Konsa with England in 2026

Personal information
- Full name: Ezri Ngoyo Konsa
- Date of birth: 23 October 1997 (age 29)
- Place of birth: Silvertown, London, England
- Height: 6 ft 0 in (1.83 m)
- Positions: Centre-back; right-back

Team information
- Current team: Arsenal
- Number: 15

Youth career
- 2006–2008: Senrab
- 2008–2016: Charlton Athletic

Senior career*
Years	Team	Apps	(Gls)
2016–2018	Charlton Athletic	71	(0)
2018–2019	Brentford	42	(1)
2019–2026	Aston Villa	231	(8)
2026–	Arsenal	10	(1)

International career^{‡}
2017–2018	England U20	5	(0)
2018–2019	England U21	7	(1)
2024–	England	31	(3)
Medal record
Men's football
Representing England
FIFA World Cup
Third place	2026 Canada–Mexico–US
UEFA European Championship
Runner-up	2024 Germany
FIFA U-20 World Cup
Winner	2017 South Korea
- * Club domestic league appearances and goals as of 19:32, 21 November 2026 (UTC) ‡ National team caps and goals as of 21:50, 15 November 2026 (UTC)

Ezri Ngoyo Konsa (born 23 October 1997) is an English professional footballer who plays as a centre-back or right-back for Premier League club Arsenal and the England national team.

Konsa came through the academy at Charlton Athletic, and later joined Brentford and subsequently Aston Villa. At Aston Villa he played a key role across seven seasons and over 280 appearances, helping the side qualify for European football in four consecutive seasons, culminating in winning the 2026 UEFA Europa League. He transferred to Arsenal in a £51m move in the summer of 2026.

He played for England at youth level, winning the 2017 FIFA U-20 World Cup with the under-20 team and the 2018 Toulon Tournament with the under-21s, before making his senior debut in March 2024. He represented the senior team at UEFA Euro 2024 and the 2026 FIFA World Cup.

== Early life ==
Ezri Ngoyo Konsa was born on 23 October 1997 in Silvertown, London, to a DR Congolese father and an Angolan mother. He attended Cumberland Sports College. He grew up as an Arsenal fan.

== Club career ==
=== Charlton Athletic ===
Konsa began his career with Senrab and joined Charlton Athletic at the age of 11. He began a scholarship in July 2014 and progressed sufficiently to sign a "long term" professional contract on 11 December 2015. Eight days later, he received his maiden call into the first-team squad for a Championship match versus Burnley and remained an unused substitute during the 4–0 defeat. Konsa was an unused substitute on one further occasion during the 2015–16 season, which culminated in Charlton's relegation to League One.

Konsa broke into the squad during the pre-season of their 2016–17 season and made his debut on 9 August 2016 with a start in a 1–0 EFL Cup first round defeat to Cheltenham Town. He was a regular throughout the 2016–17 season and finished the campaign with 39 appearances. He also showed his versatility by deputising in midfield and at full-back. For his efforts, Konsa was named the club's Young Player of the Year. He signed a new three-year contract in March 2017 and was again a regular during the 2017–18 season, making 47 appearances as Charlton reached the League One play-off semi-finals.

=== Brentford ===
On 12 June 2018, Konsa signed for Championship club Brentford on a three-year contract, with the option of a further year, for an undisclosed fee, reported to be £2.5 million. He was a first choice in central defence throughout the 2018–19 season and scored the first senior goal of his career in a 3–0 victory over Preston North End on the final day.

=== Aston Villa ===
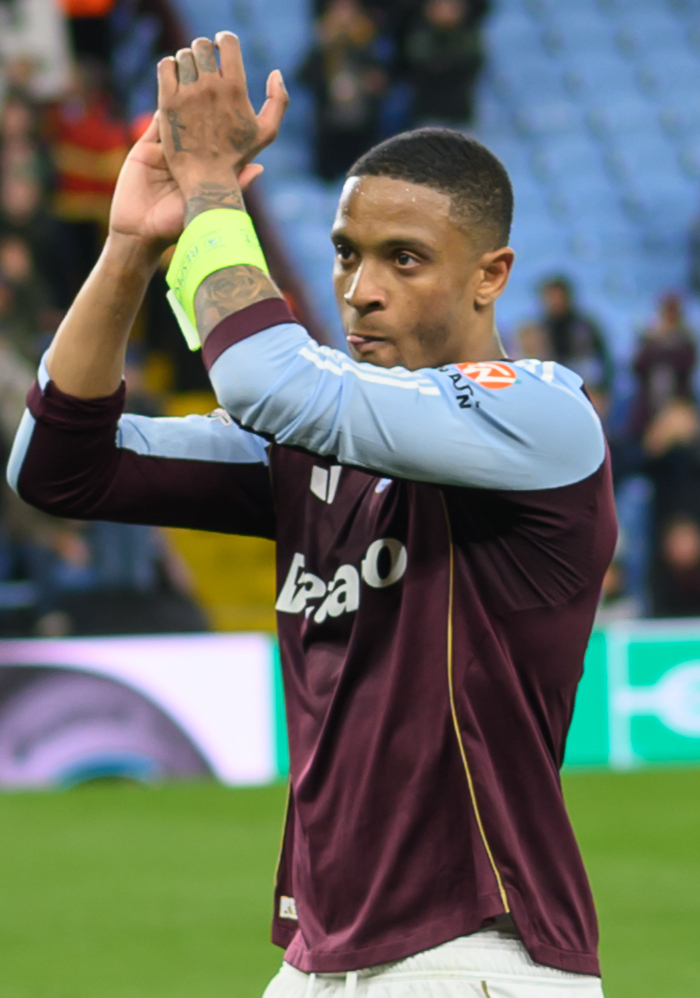
Konsa with Aston Villa in 2026

On 11 July 2019, Konsa signed for newly promoted Premier League club Aston Villa, for £12 million. The move reunited Konsa with Dean Smith, who signed him for Brentford one year earlier, and Richard O'Kelly. He scored on his debut for Villa in an EFL Cup tie against Crewe Alexandra on 27 August 2019. On 21 January 2020, Konsa assisted Tyrone Mings to set up the winning goal in a 2–1 victory against Watford. He scored his first Premier League goal on 16 July 2020, in a 1–1 away draw at Everton.

On 2 April 2021, Konsa signed a contract extension with Aston Villa until 2026. On 5 December 2021, Konsa scored twice in a 2–1 Premier League victory over Leicester City, becoming the first defender to score twice in a Premier League match for Aston Villa since 2010.

On 15 May 2022, Konsa suffered a serious knee injury in a home game against Crystal Palace. Scans confirmed that, although Konsa would miss the remaining two games of the 2021–22 season, he was expected to be fit again in August or September 2022.

Konsa returned from injury on the opening day of the 2022–23 season on 6 August 2022, and once again established himself as a first-team regular for Aston Villa. On 20 September 2023, he signed a new long-term contract at the club. On 15 April 2025, he scored his first UEFA Champions League goal in a 3–2 victory over Paris Saint-Germain during the quarter-finals of the competition.

On 6 November 2025, Konsa captained Aston Villa in a 2–0 UEFA Europa League victory over Maccabi Tel Aviv. After the match, manager Unai Emery confirmed that Konsa had been made Villa's new vice captain, deputising John McGinn. On 20 May 2026, Konsa started in the 2026 UEFA Europa League final, which Aston Villa won 3–0.

=== Arsenal ===
On 21 August 2026, Konsa signed for defending Premier League champions Arsenal on a long-term contract for an undisclosed fee, believed to be in the region of £51 million. Konsa made his debut on 31 August against his former club, replacing Cristhian Mosquera in the 79th minute of Arsenal's 1–0 win at Villa Park. He then made both his first start and home debut six days later, in Arsenal's 2–1 win against rivals Chelsea at Emirates Stadium. Konsa scored his first goal for the Gunners on 24 October 2026; opening the scoring in a 2–0 home win against Everton in the Premier League.

== International career ==
=== Youth ===
Konsa was a member of the England squad that won the 2017 FIFA U-20 World Cup with his only appearance of the tournament coming as a 93rd-minute substitute during the 3–1 semi-final victory over Italy.

Konsa was named in the under-21 squad for the 2018 Toulon Tournament and made two appearances. He was an unused substitute during the 2–1 victory over Mexico in the final. Konsa scored his first international goal on his fourth cap, in a 7–0 2019 UEFA European Under-21 Championship qualification win over Andorra on 11 October 2018. He was named in the squad for the tournament finals, but made just one appearance, as a substitute in the Young Lions' dead rubber final group stage match.

=== Senior ===
Konsa received his first call-up for the England senior team in November 2023 ahead of their UEFA Euro 2024 qualifying matches against Malta and North Macedonia, but did not play in either match. He made his debut on 23 March 2024, as a 20th-minute substitute in a 1–0 defeat to Brazil at Wembley Stadium in a friendly.

On 6 June 2024, Konsa was named in England's 26-man squad for UEFA Euro 2024. He made his competitive debut in the round of 16 win over Slovakia, playing the second half of extra time after replacing Jude Bellingham. In the quarter-final against Switzerland, he was selected to start in place of the suspended Marc Guéhi, playing 78 minutes before being substituted for Cole Palmer as England eventually won via a penalty shoot-out. He went on to play the final minute of stoppage time as a substitute for Bukayo Saka in England's 2–1 semi-final win against the Netherlands.

On 9 September 2025, Konsa scored his first senior international goal, the third in a 5–0 2026 FIFA World Cup qualification victory away at Serbia.

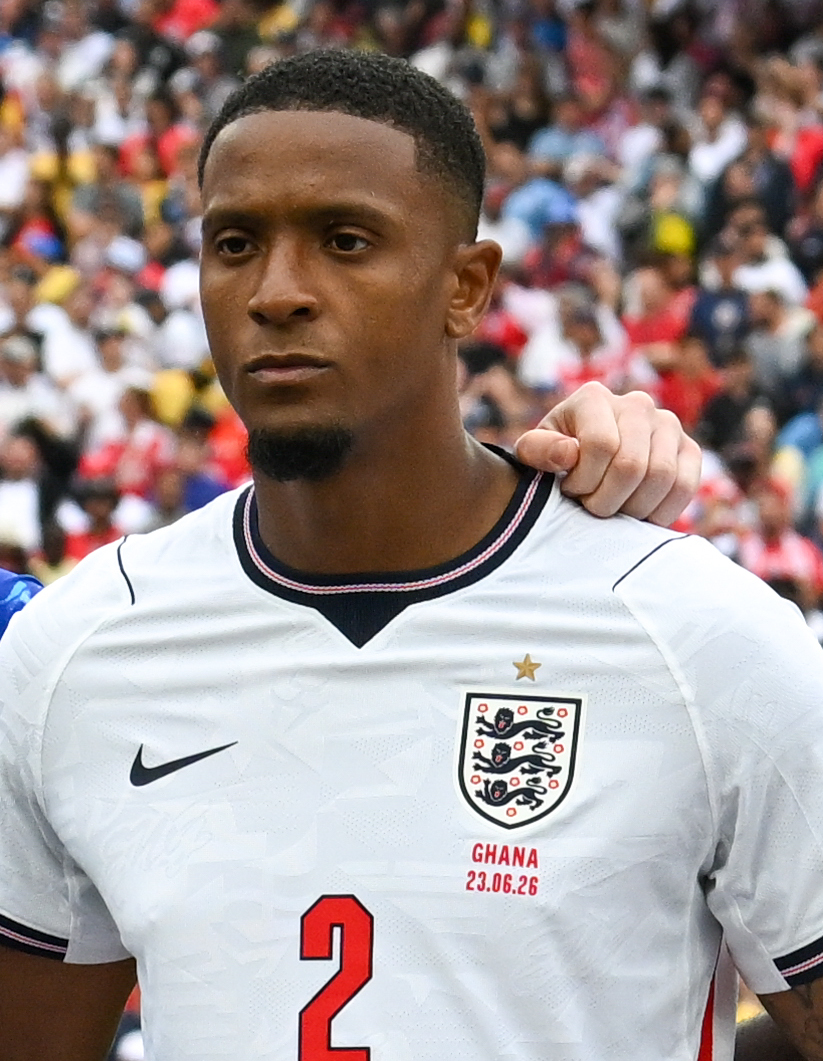
Konsa with England at the 2026 World Cup

On 22 May 2026, Konsa was selected in England's 26-man squad for the 2026 FIFA World Cup. On 17 June, Konsa made his World Cup debut, starting alongside John Stones in central defence in England's opening match against Croatia. He went on to partner Marc Guéhi against Ghana and Panama in the second and third group fixtures, keeping back-to-back clean sheets. On 6 July, he started at centre back in England's 3–2 win over Mexico at the Estadio Azteca, before moving to right back after Jarell Quansah's 54th-minute red card. He continued at right back in the 2–1 quarter-final win over Norway on 12 July. On 18 July, Konsa also played during the third-place match against France, scoring England's second goal in their 6–4 victory.

== Style of play ==
A right-footed centre-back who can also be deployed as a right-back, Konsa is considered a quick defender who frequently carries the ball up the field and gets blocks in on shots. He is noted to have a high clean tackle percentage rate compared to other defenders, rarely going in for last-chance tackles, and in April 2024 he had a 91 percent tackle rate, the highest of any defender in the big five leagues. He is also noted as a player who frequently wins duels, both aerially and on the ground.

== Career statistics ==
=== Club ===
As of match played 7 November 2026

Appearances and goals by club, season and competition
Club	Season	League			FA Cup		EFL Cup		Europe		Other		Total	
Club	Season	Division	Apps	Goals	Apps	Goals	Apps	Goals	Apps	Goals	Apps	Goals	Apps	Goals
Charlton Athletic	2015–16	Championship	0	0	0	0	0	0	—		—		0	0
Charlton Athletic	2016–17	League One	32	0	3	0	1	0	—		3 (Note: Appearances in EFL Trophy)	0	39	0
Charlton Athletic	2017–18	League One	39	0	2	0	2	0	—		4 (Note: Two appearances in EFL Trophy, two appearances in League One play-offs)	0	47	0
Charlton Athletic	Total		71	0	5	0	3	0	—		7	0	86	0
Brentford	2018–19	Championship	42	1	4	0	1	0	—		—		47	1
Aston Villa	2019–20	Premier League	25	1	0	0	6	1	—		—		31	2
Aston Villa	2020–21	Premier League	36	2	0	0	1	0	—		—		37	2
Aston Villa	2021–22	Premier League	29	2	1	0	1	0	—		—		31	2
Aston Villa	2022–23	Premier League	38	0	0	0	1	0	—		—		39	0
Aston Villa	2023–24	Premier League	35	1	2	0	1	0	12 (Note: Appearances in UEFA Europa Conference League)	0	—		50	1
Aston Villa	2024–25	Premier League	34	2	5	0	0	0	11 (Note: Appearances in UEFA Champions League)	1	—		50	3
Aston Villa	2025–26	Premier League	34	0	1	0	1	0	12 (Note: Appearances in UEFA Europa League)	2	—		48	2
Aston Villa	Total		231	8	9	0	11	1	35	3	—		286	12
Arsenal	2026–27	Premier League	9	1	0	0	2	0	4	0	—		15	1
Career total			353	10	18	0	17	1	39	3	7	0	434	14

=== International ===
As of match played 15 November 2026

Appearances and goals by national team and year
National team	Year	Apps	Goals
England	2024	9	0
England	2025	8	1
England	2026	14	2
Total		31	3

As of match played 15 November 2026
England score listed first, score column indicates score after each Konsa goal

List of international goals scored by Ezri Konsa
No.	Date	Venue	Cap	Opponent	Score	Result	Competition	Ref.
1	9 September 2025	Red Star Stadium, Belgrade, Serbia	14	Serbia	3–0	5–0	2026 FIFA World Cup qualification	
2	18 July 2026	Hard Rock Stadium, Miami Gardens, United States	28	France	2–0	6–4	2026 FIFA World Cup	
3	15 November 2026	Metropolitano Stadium, Madrid, Spain	31	Spain	2–0	3–2	2026–27 UEFA Nations League A	

== Honours ==
Aston Villa

- UEFA Europa League: 2025–26
- EFL Cup runner-up: 2019–20

England U20

- FIFA U-20 World Cup: 2017

England U21

- Toulon Tournament: 2018

England

- UEFA European Championship runner-up: 2024
- FIFA World Cup third place: 2026

Individual

- Charlton Athletic Young Player of the Year: 2016–17
