= 2025–26 Aston Villa F.C. season =

English football club season

Aston Villa
2025–26 season
- Owner: V Sports (Nassef Sawiris, Wes Edens & Atairos)
- Chairman: Nassef Sawiris
- Manager: Unai Emery
- Stadium: Villa Park
- Premier League: 4th
- FA Cup: Fourth round
- EFL Cup: Third round
- UEFA Europa League: Winners
- Top goalscorer: League: Ollie Watkins (16); All: Ollie Watkins (21)
- Highest home attendance: 43,157 (v. Manchester United, Premier League, 21 December 2025)
- Lowest home attendance: 29,429 (v. Maccabi Tel Aviv, UEFA Europa League, 6 November 2025)
- Average home league attendance: 41,969
- Biggest win: 4–0 v. Bournemouth (H); Premier League, 9 November 2025; 4–0 v. Bologna (H); Europa League, 16 April 2026; 4–0 v. Nottingham Forest (H); Europa League, 7 May 2026
- Biggest defeat: 0–3 v. Crystal Palace (H); Premier League, 31 August 2025; 1–4 v. Arsenal (A); Premier League, 30 December 2025; 1–4 v. Chelsea (H); Premier League, 4 March 2026
Home colours	Away colours	Third colours

The 2025–26 season was the 151st season in the history of Aston Villa Football Club, and their seventh consecutive season in the Premier League. In addition to the domestic league, the club also participated in the FA Cup, the EFL Cup, and the UEFA Europa League.

With a win against Chelsea on 27 December 2025, Villa reached their best winning streak in the top division since 1910, gaining eight consecutive victories. This was also the best winning streak in the league this season. Villa also finished 4th in the Premier League, qualifying for the UEFA Champions League for the second time in three years.

On 20 May 2026, Villa defeated SC Freiburg 3–0 in the Europa League final, winning their first major trophy since the 1995–96 Football League Cup.

== Players ==
This was the first season since 2017-18 without Jacob Ramsey (to Newcastle United) and Kortney Hause (Free agent).

As of 28 June 2026

No.	Player	Position	Nationality	Place of birth	Date of birth (age)	Signed from	Date signed	Fee	Contract end	Apps	Goals
Goalkeepers
23	Emiliano Martínez	GK	(Argentina)	Mar del Plata	2 September 1992 (aged 33)	Arsenal	16 September 2020	£20,000,000	30 June 2029	256	0
40	Marco Bizot	GK	(Netherlands)	Hoorn	10 March 1991 (aged 35)	(France) Brest	15 July 2025	Undisclosed	30 June 2027	14	0
64	James Wright	GK	(England)	Manchester	2 December 2004 (aged 21)	Manchester City	1 July 2021	Free transfer	30 June 2027	0	0
Defenders
2	Matty Cash	RB	(Poland)	(England) Slough	7 August 1997 (aged 28)	Nottingham Forest	3 September 2020	£14,000,000	30 June 2029	229	13
3	Victor Lindelöf	CB	(Sweden)	Västerås	17 July 1994 (aged 31)	Manchester United	1 September 2025	Free transfer	30 June 2027	28	0
4	Ezri Konsa	CB	(England)	Newham	23 October 1997 (aged 28)	Brentford	11 July 2019	£12,000,000	30 June 2028	286	12
5	Tyrone Mings	CB	(England)	Bath	13 March 1993 (aged 33)	Bournemouth	8 July 2019	£26,000,000	30 June 2027	209	9
12	Lucas Digne	LB	(France)	Meaux	20 July 1993 (aged 32)	Everton	13 January 2022	£25,000,000	30 June 2028	181	4
14	Pau Torres	CB	(Spain)	Villarreal	16 January 1997 (aged 29)	(Spain) Villarreal	12 July 2023	£31,500,000	30 June 2028	109	2
16	Andrés García	RB	(Spain)	Valencia	7 February 2003 (aged 23)	(Spain) Levante	21 January 2025	£6,000,000	30 June 2029	18	0
22	Ian Maatsen	LB	(Netherlands)	Vlaardingen	10 March 2002 (aged 24)	Chelsea	28 June 2024	£37,500,000	30 June 2030	88	3
55	Travis Patterson	LB	(England)	Wolverhampton	6 October 2005 (aged 20)	Academy	1 July 2024	—N/a	30 June 2028	1	0
59	Yeimar Mosquera	CB	(Colombia)	Istmina	6 February 2005 (aged 21)	(Colombia) Orsmoarso	30 August 2024	Undisclosed	30 June 2030	0	0
Midfielders
6	Ross Barkley	CM	(England)	Liverpool	5 December 1993 (aged 32)	Luton Town	1 July 2024	£5,000,000	30 June 2027	76	10
7	John McGinn (c)	CM	(Scotland)	Glasgow	18 October 1994 (aged 31)	(Scotland) Hibernian	8 August 2018	£3,000,000	30 June 2028	329	40
8	Youri Tielemans	CM	(Belgium)	Sint-Pieters-Leeuw	7 May 1997 (aged 29)	Leicester City	1 July 2023	Free transfer	30 June 2028	134	10
9	Harvey Elliott	AM	(England)	Chertsey	4 April 2003 (aged 23)	Liverpool	1 September 2025	Loan	30 June 2026	9	1
10	Emiliano Buendía	AM	(Argentina)	Mar del Plata	25 December 1996 (aged 29)	Norwich City	10 June 2021	£33,000,000	30 June 2027	151	21
21	Douglas Luiz	CM	(Brazil)	Rio de Janeiro	9 May 1998 (aged 28)	(Italy) Juventus	28 January 2026	Loan	30 June 2026	223	23
24	Amadou Onana	DM	(Belgium)	(Senegal) Dakar	20 August 2001 (aged 24)	Everton	22 July 2024	£50,000,000	30 June 2029	72	7
26	Lamare Bogarde	DM	(Netherlands)	Rotterdam	5 January 2004 (aged 22)	(Netherlands) Feyenoord	1 September 2020	Free transfer	30 June 2028	61	0
44	Boubacar Kamara	DM	(France)	Marseille	23 November 1999 (aged 26)	(France) Marseille	1 July 2022	Free transfer	30 June 2030	123	3
53	George Hemmings	CM	(England)	Derby	3 April 2007 (aged 19)	Nottingham Forest	9 January 2024	Undisclosed	30 June 2028	4	0
66	Fletcher Boyd	AM	(Scotland)	Aberdeen	26 January 2008 (aged 18)	(Scotland) Aberdeen	4 September 2025	£1,000,000	30 June 2031	0	0
83	Bradley Burrowes	CM	(England)	Bristol	4 March 2008 (aged 18)	Bristol Rovers	24 May 2025	Free transfer	30 June 2031	1	0
Forwards
11	Ollie Watkins	CF	(England)	Torquay	30 December 1995 (aged 30)	Brentford	9 September 2020	£28,000,000	30 June 2028	278	108
18	Tammy Abraham	CF	(England)	Camberwell	2 October 1997 (aged 28)	(Turkey) Beşiktaş	27 January 2026	£18,000,000	30 June 2031	56	29
19	Jadon Sancho	LW	(England)	Camberwell	25 March 2000 (aged 26)	Manchester United	1 September 2025	Loan	30 June 2026	39	1
27	Morgan Rogers	LW	(England)	Halesowen	26 July 2002 (aged 23)	Middlesbrough	1 February 2024	£8,000,000	30 June 2031	125	31
28	Zépiqueno Redmond	CF	(Netherlands)	Rotterdam	22 June 2006 (aged 20)	(Netherlands) Feyenoord	1 July 2025	Free transfer	30 June 2029	0	0
30	Brian Madjo	CF	(England)	Enfield	9 January 2009 (aged 17)	(France) Metz	12 January 2026	£10,000,000	30 June 2032	0	0
31	Leon Bailey	RW	(Jamaica)	Kingston	9 August 1997 (aged 28)	(Germany) Bayer Leverkusen	4 August 2021	£30,000,000	30 June 2027	162	23
47	Alysson	RW	(Brazil)	Apucarana	5 May 2006 (aged 20)	(Brazil) Grêmio	1 January 2026	£8,700,000	30 June 2031	3	0
61	Omar Khedr	RW	(Egypt)	Alexandria	25 May 2006 (aged 20)	(Egypt) ZED	1 July 2024	£2,360,000	30 June 2028	0	0
67	Mason Cotcher	CF	(England)	Sunderland	4 September 2006 (aged 19)	Sunderland	12 August 2024	Free transfer	30 June 2027	0	0
Out on loan
17	Donyell Malen	RW	(Netherlands)	Wieringen	19 January 1999 (aged 27)	(Germany) Borussia Dortmund	14 January 2025	£21,500,000	30 June 2028	46	10
18	Joe Gauci	GK	(Australia)	Adelaide	4 July 2000 (aged 25)	(Australia) Adelaide United	1 February 2024	£1,290,000	30 June 2028	2	0
19	Samuel Iling-Junior	LW	(England)	Islington	10 April 2003 (aged 23)	(Italy) Juventus	1 July 2024	£11,900,000	30 June 2029	0	0
20	Kosta Nedeljković	RB	(Serbia)	Smederevo	16 December 2005 (aged 20)	(Serbia) Red Star Belgrade	22 January 2024	£6,500,000	30 June 2029	10	0
20	Jamaldeen Jimoh-Aloba	AM	(England)	Birmingham	2 October 2006 (aged 19)	Academy	1 July 2023	—N/a	30 June 2029	6	1
21	Enzo Barrenechea	DM	(Argentina)	Villa María	22 May 2001 (aged 25)	(Italy) Juventus	1 July 2024	£6,800,000	30 June 2029	0	0
29	Evann Guessand	LW	(Ivory Coast)	(France) Ajaccio	1 July 2001 (aged 24)	(France) Nice	8 August 2025	£26,000,000	30 June 2030	21	2
33	Lewis Dobbin	LW	(England)	Stoke-on-Trent	3 January 2003 (aged 23)	Everton	23 June 2024	£10,000,000	30 June 2028	0	0
34	Louie Barry	LW	(England)	Sutton Coldfield	21 June 2003 (aged 23)	(Spain) Barcelona	23 January 2020	£880,000	30 June 2028	1	1
45	Triston Rowe	RB	(England)	Sandwell	2 October 2006 (aged 19)	West Bromwich Albion	1 July 2021	Free transfer	30 June 2026	0	0
48	Oliwier Zych	GK	(Poland)	Gdynia	28 June 2004 (aged 22)	(Poland) Zagłębie Lubin	29 September 2020	Free transfer	30 June 2026	0	0
50	Sil Swinkels	CB	(Netherlands)	Sint-Oedenrode	6 January 2004 (aged 22)	(Netherlands) Vitesse	3 August 2020	Free transfer	30 June 2028	2	0
51	Kadan Young	RW	(England)	Erdington	19 January 2006 (aged 20)	Academy	20 January 2023	—N/a	30 June 2028	3	0
54	Aidan Borland	CM	(Scotland)	Glasgow	25 April 2007 (aged 19)	(Scotland) Celtic	1 March 2024	Free transfer	30 June 2028	1	0
57	Rory Wilson	CF	(Scotland)	Girvan	5 January 2006 (aged 20)	(Scotland) Rangers	1 July 2022	£300,000	30 June 2027	0	0
58	Tommi O'Reilly	CM	(England)	Birmingham	15 December 2003 (aged 22)	Academy	1 July 2021	—N/a	30 June 2028	1	0
58	Yasin Özcan	CB	(Turkey)	Kağıthane	20 April 2006 (aged 20)	(Turkey) Kasımpaşa	1 June 2025	£5,830,000	30 June 2028	0	0
59	Josh Feeney	CB	(England)	Fleetwood	6 May 2005 (aged 21)	Fleetwood Town	6 July 2021	Free transfer	30 June 2028	0	0
62	Ben Broggio	AM	(England)	Sutton Coldfield	29 January 2007 (aged 19)	Academy	2 February 2024	—N/a	30 June 2030	1	0
—N/a	Lino Sousa	LB	(England)	(Portugal) Lisbon	19 January 2005 (aged 21)	Arsenal	1 February 2024	Undisclosed	30 June 2028	0	0

== Transfers and contracts ==
=== In ===
Date	Pos.	Player	From	Fee	Ref.
1 June 2025 (Note: The transfer was announced on 10 February, but would become official on 1 June when the transfer window reopens.)	CB	(Turkey) Yasin Özcan	(Turkey) Kasımpaşa	£5,830,000	
1 July 2025	CF	(Netherlands) Zépiqueno Redmond	(Netherlands) Feyenoord	Free transfer	
15 July 2025	GK	(Netherlands) Marco Bizot	(France) Brest	Undisclosed	
8 August 2025	CF	(Ivory Coast) Evann Guessand	(France) Nice	£26,000,000 (Note: The fee could rise to £30,400,000 with add-ons.)	
14 August 2025	GK	(Wales) Ronnie Hollingshead (Note: Academy transfer)	(England) West Bromwich Albion	Free transfer	
1 September 2025	CB	(Sweden) Victor Lindelöf	(England) Manchester United	Free transfer	
4 September 2025	CAM	(Scotland) Fletcher Boyd	(Scotland) Aberdeen	£1,000,000	
2 October 2025 (Note: The transfer was officially announced on 2 October 2025, however Koné had played numerous times for the Aston Villa youth teams by that point.)	CDM	(Ivory Coast) Mohamed Koné	(Ivory Coast) ASEC Mimosas	Undisclosed	
1 January 2026	RW	(Brazil) Alysson	(Brazil) Grêmio	£8,700,000 (Note: The fee could rise to £10,500,000 with add-ons.)	
12 January 2026	CF	(England) Brian Madjo	(France) Metz	£10,000,000	
27 January 2026	CF	(England) Tammy Abraham	(Turkey) Beşiktaş	£18,000,000	

=== Out ===
Date	Pos.	Player	To	Fee	Ref.
1 July 2025	RB	(England) Kaine Kesler-Hayden	(England) Coventry City	£3,500,000	
29 July 2025	GK	(England) Filip Marschall	(England) Stevenage	Undisclosed	
1 August 2025	CB	(Norway) Ethan Amundsen-Day	(Norway) Hamarkameratene	Undisclosed	
17 August 2025	CM	(England) Jacob Ramsey	(England) Newcastle United	£39,000,000	
19 August 2025	CDM	(Belgium) Leander Dendoncker	(Spain) Real Oviedo	Undisclosed	
22 August 2025	LB	(Spain) Àlex Moreno	(Spain) Girona	Undisclosed	
15 January 2026	LB	(England) Finley Munroe	(England) Middlesbrough	£300,000	

Income: £42,800,000 (not inc. any undisclosed transfers)
Outgoings: £69,530,000 (not inc. any undisclosed transfers)
Total Spend: ▼£16,730,000

=== Loaned in ===
Date	Pos.	Player	From	Date until	Ref.
1 September 2025	CAM	(England) Harvey Elliott	(England) Liverpool	30 June 2026	
1 September 2025	LW	(England) Jadon Sancho	(England) Manchester United	30 June 2026	
28 January 2026	CM	(Brazil) Douglas Luiz	(Italy) Juventus	30 June 2026	

=== Loaned out ===
Date	Pos.	Player	To	Date until	Ref.
16 June 2025	CB	(England) Josh Feeney	(England) Huddersfield Town	30 June 2026	
14 July 2025	RB	(Serbia) Kosta Nedeljković	(Germany) RB Leipzig	30 June 2026	
14 July 2025	GK	(Poland) Oliwier Zych	(Poland) Raków Częstochowa	30 June 2026	
15 July 2025	LB	(England) Finley Munroe	(England) Swindon Town	15 January 2026	
15 July 2025	CAM	(England) Tommi O'Reilly	(England) Crewe Alexandra	30 June 2026	
17 July 2025	CB	(Netherlands) Sil Swinkels	(England) Exeter City	4 January 2026	
18 July 2025	CM	(Argentina) Enzo Barrenechea	(Portugal) Benfica	30 June 2026	
22 July 2025	RW	(England) Louie Barry	(England) Sheffield United	3 January 2026	
1 August 2025	GK	(England) Sam Lewis	(England) Oxford City	31 December 2025	
2 August 2025	CB	(Turkey) Yasin Özcan	(Belgium) Anderlecht	28 January 2026	
7 August 2025	CAM	(England) I-Lani Edwards	(England) Hereford	31 December 2025	
11 August 2025	GK	(Australia) Joe Gauci	(England) Port Vale	30 June 2026	
15 August 2025	CB	(Scotland) Kerr Smith	(England) Barrow	9 January 2026	
20 August 2025	RW	(Jamaica) Leon Bailey	(Italy) Roma	20 January 2026	
22 August 2025	LW	(England) Lewis Dobbin	(England) Preston North End	30 June 2026	
23 August 2025	CAM	(Scotland) Ewan Simpson	(Scotland) Hamilton Academical	30 June 2026	
1 September 2025	LW	(England) Samuel Iling-Junior	(England) West Bromwich Albion	2 February 2026	
1 September 2025	CB	(Wales) Thierry Katsukunya	(Spain) Real Unión	30 June 2026	
1 September 2025	CF	(Netherlands) Zépiqueno Redmond	(England) Huddersfield Town	14 January 2026	
2 September 2025	RB	(England) Triston Rowe	(France) FC Annecy	30 June 2026	
5 September 2025	CAM	(England) Charlie Pavey	(England) Bromsgrove Sporting	4 January 2026	
31 October 2025	CAM	(England) Max Lott	(England) Stratford Town	10 April 2026	
26 November 2025	CAM	(England) Trai-Varn Mulley	(England) Stourbridge	27 December 2025	
3 January 2026	CM	(Scotland) Aidan Borland	(England) Swindon Town	30 June 2026	
4 January 2026	CB	(Netherlands) Sil Swinkels	(England) Chesterfield	30 June 2026	
10 January 2026	GK	(England) Sam Lewis	(England) Oxford City	7 February 2026	
12 January 2026	CB	(England) Ashton McWilliams	(England) Morecambe	12 February 2026	
13 January 2026	CM	(England) Kane Taylor	(England) Oldham Athletic	30 June 2026	
16 January 2026	CF	(Netherlands) Donyell Malen	(Italy) Roma	30 June 2026	
26 January 2026	CAM	(England) Charlie Pavey	(England) Hereford	30 June 2026	
28 January 2026	CB	(Turkey) Yasin Özcan	(Turkey) Beşiktaş	27 January 2027	
2 February 2026	LW	(England) Louie Barry	(England) Stockport County	30 June 2026	
2 February 2026	CAM	(England) Ben Broggio	(Scotland) Falkirk	30 June 2026	
2 February 2026	LW	(England) Samuel Iling-Junior	(Italy) Pisa	30 June 2026	
2 February 2026	CAM	(England) Jamaldeen Jimoh-Aloba	(England) West Bromwich Albion	30 June 2026	
2 February 2026	LB	(England) Lino Sousa	(England) Rotherham United	30 June 2026	
2 February 2026	RW	(England) Kadan Young	(England) Reading	30 June 2026	
6 February 2026	CF	(Scotland) Rory Wilson	(Austria) Sturm Graz	30 June 2026	
7 February 2026	CAM	(England) I-Lani Edwards	(England) Leamington	30 June 2026	
12 February 2026	LB	(England) Travis Patterson	(France) Annecy	30 June 2026	

=== Released / out of contract ===
Date	Pos.	Player	Subsequent club	Join date	Ref.
30 June 2025	CAM	(England) Rico Richards	(England) Port Vale	1 July 2025	
30 June 2025	CF	(England) Charlie Lutz	(Republic of Ireland) Cork City	1 July 2025	
30 June 2025	CB	(England) Maxwell Asante-Boakye	(England) Sheffield United	7 July 2025	
30 June 2025	GK	(Sweden) Robin Olsen	(Sweden) Malmö FF	8 July 2025	
30 June 2025	CDM	(England) Todd Alcock	(England) South Shields	15 July 2025	
30 June 2025	CM	(England) Kyrie Pierre	(England) Brentford	21 July 2025	
30 June 2025	CF	(England) Kobei Moore	(Northern Ireland) Larne	22 July 2025	
30 June 2025	CB	(England) Nile Timson	(England) Alvechurch	31 July 2025	
30 June 2025	RW	(Bermuda) Ajani Burchall	(England) Wimborne Town	20 September 2025	
30 June 2025	CM	(England) Mikell Barnes			
30 June 2025	GK	(England) Alex Hammond			
30 June 2025	CB	(England) Kortney Hause			
4 July 2025	LW	(Brazil) Philippe Coutinho	(Brazil) Vasco da Gama	4 July 2025	
17 July 2025	GK	(Spain) Lander Emery	(Spain) Real Unión	18 July 2025	
26 January 2026	CB	(England) Archie Duerden	(England) Bromsgrove Sporting	26 January 2026	

=== New contract ===
Date	Pos.	Player	End date	Ref.
First team
4 June 2025	CB	(England) Tyrone Mings	30 June 2027	
24 July 2025	CDM	(France) Boubacar Kamara	30 June 2030	
7 August 2025	LB	(France) Lucas Digne	30 June 2028	
27 October 2025	RB	(Poland) Matty Cash	30 June 2029	
5 November 2025	CM	(Scotland) John McGinn	30 June 2028	
10 November 2025	CAM	(England) Morgan Rogers	30 June 2031	
23 March 2026	CAM	(England) Bradley Burrowes	Undisclosed	
Under-21s and Academy
1 July 2025	CB	(England) TJ Carroll	Undisclosed (Note: First professional contract)	
2 July 2025	RB	(England) Ashton McWilliams	Undisclosed	
3 July 2025	CB	(Wales) Thierry Katsukunya	Undisclosed	
4 July 2025	LW	(England) Trai-Varn Mulley	Undisclosed	
8 July 2025	MF	(England) Max Lott	Undisclosed	
17 September 2025	MF	(England) Oliver Bindley	Undisclosed	
30 September 2025	DF	(England) Finlay Barnard	Undisclosed	
16 October 2025	MF	(England) Jack McGrath	Undisclosed	
12 November 2025	LB	(England) Teddie Bloomfield	Undisclosed	
24 November 2025	MF	(Republic of Ireland) Keilan Quinn	Undisclosed	
4 December 2025	DF	(England) Leon Routh	Undisclosed	
27 January 2026	MF	(Republic of Ireland) Alfie Lynskey	Undisclosed	
25 February 2026	MF	(Scotland) Fletcher Boyd	Undisclosed	
7 March 2026	MF	(Northern Ireland) Cole Brannigan	Undisclosed	

== Kits ==
Supplier: Adidas / Sponsor: Betano / Sleeve sponsor: Trade Nation

Home	Home Alt. 1	Home Alt. 2	Away	Away Alt. 1	Away Alt. 2	Away Alt. 3	Third	Third Alt. 1	Third Alt. 2	Third Alt. 3

== Pre-season and friendlies ==
Aston Villa announced they would return to the United States to face St. Louis City SC and Nashville SC, to Germany to face Hansa Rostock and the annual pre-season opener against Walsall. Some further friendlies against Eintracht Frankfurt and Roma were added to the schedule on 16 June 2025. On 7 July, two more friendlies were added to the schedule against Marseille and Villarreal. An additional friendly against La Liga club Elche was organised for the March 2026 international break.

Win Draw Loss Fixtures

15 July 2025 Friendly	Leamington	2–3	Aston Villa XI	Leamington Spa
19:30 BST	Clarke 36'; Berridge 65'	Report	Amundsen-Day 10'; Khedr 37'; Cotcher 52'	Stadium: Your Co-op Community Stadium; Attendance: 452; Referee: Lewis Smith

16 July 2025 Friendly	Walsall	1–0	Aston Villa	Bescot
19:30 BST	Burke 38'	Report		Stadium: Bescot Stadium

19 July 2025 Friendly	Hansa Rostock	3–1	Aston Villa	Rostock, Germany
16:00 CEST	Hummel 67', 90+2'; Krauß 85'	Report	Moreno (yellow card) 42'; Ramsey 45'; Özcan (yellow card) 55'; Barry (yellow card) 89'	Stadium: Ostseestadion

22 July 2025 Friendly	AFC Telford United	1–1	Aston Villa XI	Telford
19:45 BST	Allen-Hadley 67' (pen.)	Report	Fridye-Harper 17' (o.g.)	Stadium: New Bucks Head

26 July 2025 Friendly	Eintracht Frankfurt	2–2	Aston Villa	Louisville, United States
19:00 EDT	Wahi 20'; Aaronson (yellow card) 33'; Dills (yellow card) 65'; Is 82', (yellow card) 83'; Amenda (yellow card) 90+1'	Report	Watkins 12'; Rogers 49'; Rowe (yellow card) 80'	Stadium: Lynn Family Stadium; Attendance: 15,300

30 July 2025 Friendly	St. Louis City SC	1–2	Aston Villa	St. Louis, United States
19:30 CDT	Joyner (yellow card) 51'; Teuchert 59'	Report	Rogers 14'; McGinn (yellow card) 17'; Watkins 56'	Stadium: Energizer Park

2 August 2025 Friendly	Nashville SC	2–2	Aston Villa	Nashville, United States
19:00 CDT	Corcoran 76'; Bauer (yellow card) 82'; Surridge 85'	Report	Watkins 18'; Kamara (yellow card) 32'; Malen 64'	Stadium: Geodis Park

6 August 2025 Friendly	Aston Villa	4–0	Roma	Bescot
19:30 BST	Buendía 15'; Ramsey 17'; Watkins 40'; Malen 85'	Report		Stadium: Bescot Stadium; Attendance: 11,000; Referee: Craig Pawson (England)

9 August 2025 Friendly	Marseille	3–1	Aston Villa	Marseille, France
19:00 CET	Greenwood 5', (yellow card) 84'; Medina (yellow card) 31'; Højbjerg (yellow card) 45+5'; Garcia (yellow card) 66'; Aubameyang 76', 79'; Egan-Riley (yellow card) 89'; Maupay (yellow card) 90+5'	Report	McGinn 8', (yellow card) 67'; Cash (yellow card) 34'; Guessand (yellow card) 70'; Malen (yellow card) 76'; Mings (yellow card) 89'; Onana (yellow card) 90+1'	Stadium: Stade Vélodrome

10 August 2025 Friendly	Villarreal	0–2	Aston Villa	Villarreal, Spain
20:00 CET	Cardona (yellow card) 88'	Report	Watkins 23'; Buendía 49'	Stadium: Estadio de la Cerámica; Attendance: 23,000

27 March 2026 Friendly	Elche	2–1	Aston Villa	San Pedro del Pinatar, Spain
11:30 CET	Redondo 45+2'; Pétrot (yellow card) 69'; Rodríguez 90+4'	Report	Torres 21'; Buendía (yellow card) 67'	Stadium: Pinatar Arena; Attendance: 1,500

== Competitions ==
=== Overall record ===
Competition	First match	Last match	Starting round	Final position	Record							
Competition	First match	Last match	Starting round	Final position	Pld	W	D	L	GF	GA	GD	Win %
Premier League	16 August 2025	24 May 2026	Matchday 1	4th	38	19	8	11	56	49	+7	50.00
FA Cup	10 January 2026	14 February 2026	Third round	Fourth round	2	1	0	1	3	4	−1	50.00
EFL Cup	16 September 2025		Third round	Third round	1	0	1	0	1	1	+0	0.00
UEFA Europa League	25 September 2025	20 May 2026	League phase	Winners	15	13	0	2	31	8	+23	86.67
Total					56	33	9	14	91	62	+29	58.93

Source: Soccerway

=== Premier League ===
==== League table ====
Pos	Team	Pld	W	D	L	GF	GA	GD	Pts	Qualification or relegation
2	Manchester City	38	23	9	6	77	35	+42	78	Qualification for the Champions League league phase (Note: The Premier League gained an additional Champions League place as a result of England gaining one of the two European Performance Spots (EPS) awarded to the two associations with the highest UEFA coefficient points in 2025–26.)
3	Manchester United	38	20	11	7	69	50	+19	71	Qualification for the Champions League league phase
4	Aston Villa	38	19	8	11	56	49	+7	65	Qualification for the Champions League league phase
5	Liverpool	38	17	9	12	63	53	+10	60	Qualification for the Champions League league phase
6	Bournemouth	38	13	18	7	58	54	+4	57	Qualification for the Europa League league phase (Note: Since the winners of the 2025–26 FA Cup and 2025–26 EFL Cup, Manchester City, qualified for the Champions League by league position, the spot reserved for the FA Cup winners (Europa League league phase) was passed to the seventh-placed team, and the spot reserved for the EFL Cup winners (Conference League play-off round) was passed to the eighth-placed team.)

Source: Premier League
Rules for classification: 1) Points; 2) Goal difference; 3) Goals scored; 4) If the champions, relegated teams or qualified teams for UEFA competitions cannot be determined by rules 1 to 3, rules 4.1 to 4.3 are applied – 4.1) Points gained in head-to-head record between such teams; 4.2) Away goals scored in head-to-head record between such teams; 4.3) Play-offs

==== Results summary ====
Overall								Home						Away					
Pld	W	D	L	GF	GA	GD	Pts	W	D	L	GF	GA	GD	W	D	L	GF	GA	GD
38	19	8	11	56	49	+7	65	12	2	5	32	22	+10	7	6	6	24	27	−3

Source: Soccerway

==== Results by round ====
Round	1	2	3	4	5	6	7	8	9	10	11	12	13	14	15	16	17	18	19	20	21	22	23	24	25	26	27	28	29	30	31	32	33	34	35	36	37	38
Ground	H	A	H	A	A	H	H	A	H	A	H	A	H	A	H	A	H	A	A	H	A	H	A	H	A	H	H	A	H	A	H	A	H	A	H	A	H	A
Result	D	L	L	D	D	W	W	W	W	L	W	W	W	W	W	W	W	W	L	W	D	L	W	L	D	W	D	L	L	L	W	D	W	L	L	D	W	W
Position	10	17	19	19	18	16	13	11	8	11	6	4	4	3	3	3	3	3	3	3	3	3	3	3	3	3	3	4	4	4	4	4	4	5	5	5	4	4
Points	1	1	1	2	3	6	9	12	15	15	18	21	24	27	30	33	36	39	39	42	43	43	46	46	47	50	51	51	51	51	54	55	58	58	58	59	62	65

Source: Soccerway
A = Away; H = Home; W = Win; D = Draw; L = Loss

==== Matches ====
The Premier League fixtures were announced on 18 June 2025.

Win Draw Loss Fixtures

16 August 2025 1	Aston Villa	0–0	Newcastle United	Birmingham
12:30 BST	Kamara (yellow card) 58'; Konsa (red card) 66'	Report	Joelinton (yellow card) 45'	Stadium: Villa Park; Attendance: 42,526; Referee: Craig Pawson

23 August 2025 2	Brentford	1–0	Aston Villa	Brentford
15:00 BST	Ouattara 12'; Kelleher (yellow card) 55'	Report	Onana (yellow card) 57'; Bogarde (yellow card) 84'	Stadium: Brentford Community Stadium; Attendance: 16,838; Referee: Tony Harrington

31 August 2025 3	Aston Villa	0–3	Crystal Palace	Birmingham
19:00 BST	Cash (yellow card) 13'; Bizot (yellow card) 20'	Report	Mateta 21' (pen.), (yellow card) 22'; Hughes (yellow card) 52'; Guéhi 68'; Sarr 78', (yellow card) 87'	Stadium: Villa Park; Attendance: 41,036; Referee: Stuart Attwell
Note: Fixture was originally scheduled for 30 August, but was moved for live Sky Sports broadcasting. It was later moved again due to Crystal Palace's participation in the UEFA Conference League on the preceding Thursday.

13 September 2025 4	Everton	0–0	Aston Villa	Liverpool
15:00 BST	Iroegbunam (yellow card) 45+1'; Dewsbury-Hall (yellow card) 65'; Grealish (yellow card) 69'	Report	Cash (yellow card) 34'; Digne (yellow card) 57'; Buendía (yellow card) 70'	Stadium: Hill Dickinson Stadium; Attendance: 52,114; Referee: Simon Hooper

21 September 2025 5	Sunderland	1–1	Aston Villa	Sunderland
14:00 BST	Mandava (red card) 33'; Sadiki (yellow card) 74'; Isidor 75'; Xhaka (yellow card) 88'	Report	Maatsen (yellow card) 63'; Cash 67'	Stadium: Stadium of Light; Attendance: 46,261; Referee: Sam Barrott
Note: Fixture was originally scheduled for 20 September, but was moved for live Sky Sports broadcasting.

28 September 2025 6	Aston Villa	3–1	Fulham	Birmingham
14:00 BST	Watkins 37'; McGinn (yellow card) 45+5', (goal) 49'; Buendía 51'	Report	Jiménez 3'; King (yellow card) 22'; Lukić (yellow card) 34'; Wilson (yellow card) 45+1'; Bassey (yellow card) 55'	Stadium: Villa Park; Attendance: 40,350; Referee: Andrew Madley
Note: Fixture was initially scheduled for 27 September, but was rescheduled due to Aston Villa's participation in the UEFA Europa League on the preceding Thursday.

5 October 2025 7	Aston Villa	2–1	Burnley	Birmingham
14:00 BST	Malen 25', 63'; Digne (yellow card) 53'; Buendía (yellow card) 90+1'; Martínez (yellow card) 90+3'	Report	Foster (yellow card) 17'; Ugochukwu 78'	Stadium: Villa Park; Attendance: 40,308; Referee: Andrew Kitchen
Note: Fixture was originally scheduled for 4 October, but was rescheduled for live Sky Sports broadcasting.

19 October 2025 8	Tottenham Hotspur	1–2	Aston Villa	Tottenham
14:00 BST	Bentancur 5'; Van de Ven (yellow card) 22'; Danso (yellow card) 67'	Report	Rogers 37'; Buendía 77'	Stadium: Tottenham Hotspur Stadium; Attendance: 61,291; Referee: Simon Hooper
Note: Fixture was originally scheduled for 18 October, but was rescheduled for live Sky Sports broadcasting.

26 October 2025 9	Aston Villa	1–0	Manchester City	Birmingham
14:00 GMT	Cash 19'; Kamara (yellow card) 81'	Report	Savinho (yellow card) 40'; Reijnders (yellow card) 54'; González (yellow card) 64'; Foden (yellow card) 80'	Stadium: Villa Park; Attendance: 41,988; Referee: Michael Oliver
Note: Fixture was originally scheduled for 25 October, but was rescheduled for live Sky Sports broadcasting.

1 November 2025 10	Liverpool	2–0	Aston Villa	Liverpool
20:00 GMT	Salah 45+1'; Van Dijk (yellow card) 54'; Gravenberch 58'; Szoboszlai (yellow card) 87'	Report	Cash (yellow card) 57'; Onana (yellow card) 73'; Rogers (yellow card) 81'	Stadium: Anfield; Attendance: 60,407; Referee: Stuart Attwell
Note: Fixture was originally schuled for a 15:00 kickoff, but was moved for live TNT Sports broadcasting.

9 November 2025 11	Aston Villa	4–0	Bournemouth	Birmingham
14:00 GMT	Rogers (yellow card) 13'; Kamara (yellow card) 23'; Buendía 28'; Onana 40'; Barkley 77'; Malen 83'	Report	Jiménez (yellow card) 27'; Truffert (yellow card) 38'; Semenyo (penalty missed) 67'	Stadium: Villa Park; Attendance: 40,792; Referee: John Brooks
Note: Fixture was originally scheduled for 8 November, but was rescheduled for live Sky Sports broadcasting.

23 November 2025 12	Leeds United	1–2	Aston Villa	Leeds
14:00 GMT	Nmecha 8'; Bogle (yellow card) 41'; Tanaka (yellow card) 45+3'; Ampadu (yellow card) 63'; Struijk (yellow card) 74'; Gnonto (yellow card) 89'	Report	Rogers 48', 75'; McGinn (yellow card) 53'	Stadium: Elland Road; Attendance: 36,819; Referee: Robert Jones
Note: Fixture was originally scheduled for 22 November, but was rescheduled for live Sky Sports broadcasting.

30 November 2025 13	Aston Villa	1–0	Wolverhampton Wanderers	Birmingham
14:05 GMT	Kamara 67'	Report	André (yellow card) 45+2'; Wolfe (yellow card) 58'; Mosquera (yellow card) 76'; Arias (yellow card) 80'	Stadium: Villa Park; Attendance: 42,139; Referee: Chris Kavanagh
Note: Fixture was originally scheduled for 29 November, but was rescheduled for live Sky Sports broadcasting.

3 December 2025 14	Brighton & Hove Albion	3–4	Aston Villa	Brighton and Hove
19:30 GMT	Van Hecke 9', 83'; Torres 29' (o.g.); Verbruggen (yellow card) 45+9'; Gómez (yellow card) 85'	Report	Watkins 37', 45+7'; Onana 60'; McGinn (yellow card) 75'; Malen 78'; Bizot (yellow card) 90+5'	Stadium: Falmer Stadium; Attendance: 31,180; Referee: Andrew Madley
Note: Fixture was originally scheduled for a 20:00 kick off, but was rescheduled for live Sky Sports broadcasting.

6 December 2025 15	Aston Villa	2–1	Arsenal	Birmingham
12:30 GMT	Cash 36'; Buendía 90+5'	Report	Trossard 52'; Calafiori (yellow card) 72'; Saka (yellow card) 74'	Stadium: Villa Park; Attendance: 42,888; Referee: Peter Bankes
Note: Fixture was originally scheduled for a 15:00 kickoff, but was rescheduled for live TNT Sports broadcasting.

14 December 2025 16	West Ham United	2–3	Aston Villa	Stratford
14:00 GMT	Fernandes 1'; Bowen 24'; Diouf (yellow card) 90+2'	Report	Mavropanos 9' (o.g.); Kamara (yellow card) 38'; Cash (yellow card) 42'; Rogers 50', 79'	Stadium: London Stadium; Attendance: 62,447; Referee: Anthony Taylor
Note: Fixture was originally scheduled for a 15:00 kickoff on 13 December, but was rescheduled for live Sky Sports broadcasting.

21 December 2025 17	Aston Villa	2–1	Manchester United	Birmingham
16:30 GMT	Rogers 45', 57'; Bogarde (yellow card) 90+2'	Report	Cunha 45+3'; Ugarte (yellow card) 68'; Dalot (yellow card) 72'	Stadium: Villa Park; Attendance: 43,157; Referee: Michael Oliver
Note: Fixture was originally scheduled for a 15:00 kickoff on 20 December, but was rescheduled for live Sky Sports broadcasting.

27 December 2025 18	Chelsea	1–2	Aston Villa	Fulham
17:30 GMT	João Pedro 37'; James (yellow card) 57'; Chalobah (yellow card) 68'; Caicedo (yellow card) 71'; Delap (yellow card) 71'; Fernández (yellow card) 90+4'	Report	Cash (yellow card) 30'; Rogers (yellow card) 57'; Watkins 63', 84'; Kamara (yellow card) 78'	Stadium: Stamford Bridge; Attendance: 39,765; Referee: Stuart Attwell
Note: Fixture was initially scheduled for a 15:00 kick-off, but was rescheduled for live Sky Sports broadcasting.

30 December 2025 19	Arsenal	4–1	Aston Villa	Holloway
20:15 GMT	Merino (yellow card) 45+1'; Gabriel 48'; Zubimendi 52'; Trossard 69'; Gabriel Jesus 78', (yellow card) 79'	Report	Rogers (yellow card) 45+2'; Bogarde (yellow card) 82'; Watkins 90+4', (yellow card) 90+7'	Stadium: Emirates Stadium; Attendance: 60,279; Referee: Darren England
Note: Fixture was initially scheduled for a 20:00 kick-off, but was rescheduled for live Sky Sports broadcasting.

3 January 2026 20	Aston Villa	3–1	Nottingham Forest	Birmingham
12:30 GMT	Watkins 45+1'; McGinn 49', 73'; Bogarde (yellow card) 90+4'	Report	Gibbs-White 61'; Bakwa (yellow card) 65'; McAtee (yellow card) 89'	Stadium: Villa Park; Attendance: 43,039; Referee: Simon Hooper
Note: Fixture was initially scheduled for a 15:00 kick-off, but was rescheduled for live Sky Sports broadcasting.

7 January 2026 21	Crystal Palace	0–0	Aston Villa	Selhurst
19:30 GMT	Johnson (yellow card) 67'; Mitchell (yellow card) 83'	Report		Stadium: Selhurst Park; Attendance: 24,841; Referee: Andrew Madley
Note: Fixture was initially scheduled for a 20:00 kick-off, but was rescheduled for live Sky Sports broadcasting.

18 January 2026 22	Aston Villa	0–1	Everton	Birmingham
16:30 GMT	Bogarde (yellow card) 56'	Report	McNeil (yellow card) 23'; Garner (yellow card) 47'; Barry 59'	Stadium: Villa Park; Attendance: 42,770; Referee: Tony Harrington
Note: Fixture was initially scheduled for a Saturday 17 January, but was rescheduled for live Sky Sports broadcasting.

25 January 2026 23	Newcastle United	0–2	Aston Villa	Newcastle upon Tyne
14:00 GMT	Joelinton (yellow card) 27'	Report	Buendía 19'; Digne (yellow card) 79'; Watkins 88'; Maatsen (yellow card) 90+2'	Stadium: St James' Park; Attendance: 52,134; Referee: Jarred Gillett
Note: Fixture was initially scheduled for a Saturday 24 January, but was rescheduled for live Sky Sports broadcasting.

1 February 2026 24	Aston Villa	0–1	Brentford	Birmingham
14:00 GMT	Rogers (yellow card) 90+3'	Report	Ajer (yellow card) 35'; Schade (red card) 42'; Ouattara 45+1'; Kayode (yellow card) 45+5'; Collins (yellow card) 90+1'; Janelt (yellow card) 90+3'	Stadium: Villa Park; Attendance: 41,415; Referee: Tim Robinson
Note: Fixture was initially scheduled for a Saturday 31 January, but was rescheduled for live Sky Sports broadcasting.

7 February 2026 25	Bournemouth	1–1	Aston Villa	Bournemouth
15:00 GMT	Jiménez (yellow card) 35'; Rayan 55'	Report	Rogers 22'; Buendía (yellow card) 35'	Stadium: Dean Court; Attendance: 11,248; Referee: Anthony Taylor

11 February 2026 26	Aston Villa	1–0	Brighton & Hove Albion	Birmingham
19:30 GMT	Martínez (yellow card) 41'; Rogers (yellow card) 50'; Hinshelwood 86' (o.g.)	Report	Baleba (yellow card) 2'; Veltman (yellow card) 23'; Van Hecke (yellow card) 41'	Stadium: Villa Park; Attendance: 39,495; Referee: Peter Bankes
Note: Fixture was initially scheduled for an 20:00 kickoff, but was moved earlier for live TNT Sports broadcasting.

21 February 2026 27	Aston Villa	1–1	Leeds United	Birmingham
15:00 GMT	Buendía (yellow card) 73'; Abraham 88'	Report	Stach 31'; Bijol (yellow card) 62'; Darlow (yellow card) 69'; Bogle (yellow card) 79'; Gruev (yellow card) 90+2'	Stadium: Villa Park; Attendance: 43,048; Referee: Michael Oliver

27 February 2026 28	Wolverhampton Wanderers	2–0	Aston Villa	Wolverhampton
20:00 GMT	Mosquera (yellow card) 45+1'; Armstrong (yellow card) 51'; Bellegarde (yellow card) 58'; João Gomes 61'; Gomes 90+8'	Report	Buendía (yellow card) 54'; Bailey (yellow card) 75'; Cash (yellow card) 90+2'	Stadium: Molineux Stadium; Attendance: 30,197; Referee: Craig Pawson
Note: Fixture was initially scheduled for a 15:00 kick off on Saturday 28 February, but was moved for live Sky Sports broadcasting.

4 March 2026 29	Aston Villa	1–4	Chelsea	Birmingham
19:30 GMT	Douglas Luiz 2'; Cash (yellow card) 32'; Rogers (yellow card) 58'; Watkins (yellow card) 68'	Report	João Pedro 35', 45+6', 64', (yellow card) 54'; Palmer 55'; Fernández (yellow card) 58'	Stadium: Villa Park; Attendance: 42,084; Referee: Jarred Gillett
Note: Fixture was initially scheduled for an 20:00 kickoff, but was moved earlier for live TNT Sports broadcasting.

15 March 2026 30	Manchester United	3–1	Aston Villa	Trafford
14:00 GMT	Casemiro 53', (yellow card) 60'; Cunha 71'; Yoro (yellow card) 72'; Šeško 81'; Maguire (yellow card) 90+6'	Report	Watkins (yellow card) 41'; Barkley 64'; Buendía (yellow card) 69'	Stadium: Old Trafford; Attendance: 73,997; Referee: Anthony Taylor
Note: Fixture was initially scheduled for a 15:00 kickoff on 14 March 2026, but was rescheduled due to Aston Villa's participation in the UEFA Europa League on the preceding Thursday.

22 March 2026 31	Aston Villa	2–0	West Ham United	Birmingham
14:15 GMT	McGinn 15'; Watkins 68'	Report	Wan-Bissaka (yellow card) 45'	Stadium: Villa Park; Attendance: 42,130; Referee: Paul Tierney
Note: Fixture was initially scheduled for a 15:00 kickoff on 21 March 2026, but was rescheduled due to Aston Villa's participation in the UEFA Europa League.

12 April 2026 32	Nottingham Forest	1–1	Aston Villa	West Bridgford
14:00 BST	Williams 38'; Hutchinson (yellow card) 45'; Murillo (yellow card) 63'	Report	Cash (yellow card) 11'; Murillo 23' (o.g.); McGinn (yellow card) 67'	Stadium: City Ground; Attendance: 30,591; Referee: Michael Salisbury
Note: Fixture was initially scheduled for a 11 April, but was pushed back a day due to participation in the UEFA Europa League on the preceding Thursday.

19 April 2026 33	Aston Villa	4–3	Sunderland	Birmingham
14:00 BST	Watkins 2', 36'; Rogers 46'; Abraham 90+3'; Onana (yellow card) 90+8'	Report	Rigg 9'; Sadiki (yellow card) 66'; Hume 86'; Isidor 87'; Mukiele (yellow card) 90+5'; Ballard (yellow card) 90+8'	Stadium: Villa Park; Attendance: 42,599; Referee: Sam Barrott
Note: Fixture was initially scheduled for a 18 April, but was pushed back a day due to participation in the UEFA Europa League on the preceding Thursday.

25 April 2026 34	Fulham	1–0	Aston Villa	Fulham
12:30 BST	Sessegnon 43'; Castagne (yellow card) 46'; Wilson (yellow card) 90+1'	Report	Torres (yellow card) 49'; Douglas Luiz (yellow card) 90+4'	Stadium: Craven Cottage; Attendance: 27,606; Referee: Michael Oliver
Note: Fixture was initially scheduled for a 15:00 kickoff, but was brought forward for TNT Sports broadcasting.

3 May 2026 35	Aston Villa	1–2	Tottenham Hotspur	Birmingham
19:00 BST	Barkley (yellow card) 51'; Rogers (yellow card) 77'; Buendía 90+6'	Report	Gallagher 12', (yellow card) 90+6'; Richarlison 25'; Kolo Muani (yellow card) 27'; Bentancur (yellow card) 45'; Tel (yellow card) 73'; Danso (yellow card) 81'	Stadium: Villa Park; Attendance: 42,767; Referee: Sam Barrott
Note: Fixture was initially scheduled for a 15:00 kick-off, but was brought forward for TNT Sports broadcasting. Fixture was again moved due to Villa's participation in the UEFA Europa League.

10 May 2026 36	Burnley	2–2	Aston Villa	Burnley
14:00 BST	Anthony 8'; Flemming 58', (yellow card) 60'	Report	Barkley 42'; Mings (yellow card) 49'; Watkins 56'	Stadium: Turf Moor; Attendance: 21,196; Referee: Anthony Taylor
Note: Fixture was initially scheduled for 15:00 on 9 May 2026, but was moved due to Villa's participation in the UEFA Europa League.

15 May 2026 37	Aston Villa	4–2	Liverpool	Birmingham
20:00 BST	Cash (yellow card) 39'; Rogers 42'; Watkins (yellow card) 45+3', (goal) 57', 73'; McGinn (yellow card) 66', (goal) 89'	Report	Van Dijk 52', 90+2'; Gomez (yellow card) 62'	Stadium: Villa Park; Attendance: 43,033; Referee: Chris Kavanagh
Note: Fixture was initially rescheduled for 12:30 on 17 May 2026 for Sky Sports coverage, but was moved forward due to Villa's participation in the UEFA Europa League final.

24 May 2026 38	Manchester City	1–2	Aston Villa	Manchester
16:00 BST	Semenyo 23'; Lewis (yellow card) 82'	Report	Watkins 47', 61'	Stadium: Etihad Stadium; Attendance: 60,332; Referee: Andrew Madley

=== FA Cup ===
As a Premier League side, Aston Villa entered in the third round, and were drawn away to Tottenham Hotspur. They were then drawn at home to Newcastle United in the fourth round.

Win Draw Loss Fixtures

10 January 2026 Third round	Tottenham Hotspur	1–2	Aston Villa	Tottenham
17:45 GMT	Odobert 54'; Gray (yellow card) 57'; Porro (yellow card) 79'; Palhinha (yellow card) 85'	Report	Buendía 22', (yellow card) 67'; Rogers 45+3'; García (yellow card) 81'	Stadium: Tottenham Hotspur Stadium; Attendance: 57,718; Referee: Craig Pawson
Note: Match kickoff time moved for television coverage on both BBC Sport and TNT Sports.

14 February 2026 Fourth round	Aston Villa	1–3	Newcastle United	Birmingham
17:45 GMT	Douglas Luiz (yellow card) 4'; Abraham 14'; Digne (yellow card) 42'; Bizot (red card) 45+1'	Report	Thiaw (yellow card) 25'; Barnes (yellow card) 52'; Ramsey (yellow card) 55'; Tonali 63', 76'; Woltemade 88'	Stadium: Villa Park; Attendance: 42,101; Referee: Chris Kavanagh
Note: Match kickoff time moved for television coverage on both BBC Sport and TNT Sports.

=== EFL Cup ===
As one of the Premier League clubs involved in European competitions, Aston Villa joined the competition in the third round, and were drawn away to Brentford.

Win Draw Loss Fixtures

16 September 2025 Third round	Brentford	1–1 (4–2 p)	Aston Villa	Brentford
20:00 BST	Hickey 57'	Report	Guessand (yellow card) 25'; Elliott 43'; Bogarde (yellow card) 68'	Stadium: Brentford Community Stadium; Attendance: 15,895; Referee: John Brooks
	Penalties
	Carvalho (penalty scored); Nelson (penalty scored); Yarmolyuk (penalty scored); Damsgaard (penalty scored)		(penalty missed) McGinn; (penalty scored) Watkins; (penalty scored) Buendía; (penalty missed) Cash

=== UEFA Europa League ===
==== League phase ====
On 29 August 2025, Aston Villa were drawn against Bologna, Maccabi Tel Aviv, Young Boys and Red Bull Salzburg at home, and Feyenoord, Go Ahead Eagles, Basel and Fenerbahçe away in the league phase. The order of the league phase fixtures was announced the following day.

Pos	Team	Pld	W	D	L	GF	GA	GD	Pts	Qualification
1	(French Football Federation) Lyon	8	7	0	1	18	5	+13	21	Advance to round of 16 (seeded)
2	(The Football Association) Aston Villa	8	7	0	1	14	6	+8	21	Advance to round of 16 (seeded)
3	(Danish Football Association) Midtjylland	8	6	1	1	18	8	+10	19	Advance to round of 16 (seeded)
4	(Royal Spanish Football Federation) Real Betis	8	5	2	1	13	7	+6	17 (Note: Away goals scored: Real Betis 5, Porto 3.)	Advance to round of 16 (seeded)
5	(Portuguese Football Federation) Porto	8	5	2	1	13	7	+6	17	Advance to round of 16 (seeded)

Source: UEFA
Rules for classification: League phase tiebreakers
Notes:

Round	1	2	3	4	5	6	7	8
Ground	H	A	A	H	H	A	A	H
Result	W	W	L	W	W	W	W	W
Position	13	3	10	6	3	3	2	2
Points	3	6	6	9	12	15	18	21

Source: UEFA
A = Away; H = Home; W = Win; D = Draw; L = Loss

Win Draw Loss Fixtures

25 September 2025 1	Aston Villa (England)	1–0	(Italy) Bologna	Birmingham, England
20:00 BST	McGinn 13', (yellow card) 71'; Cash (yellow card) 42'; Watkins (penalty missed) 68'	Report	Vitík (yellow card) 67'; Lucumí (yellow card) 67'	Stadium: Villa Park; Attendance: 30,909; Referee: Jesús Gil Manzano (Spain)

2 October 2025 2	Feyenoord (Netherlands)	0–2	(England) Aston Villa	Rotterdam, Netherlands
21:00 CEST	Ahmedhodžić (yellow card) 13'; Steijn (yellow card) 49'; Larin (yellow card) 85'	Report	Buendía 61'; McGinn 79'; Bizot (yellow card) 82'; Rogers (yellow card) 85'; Lindelöf (yellow card) 90+3'	Stadium: De Kuip; Attendance: 42,634; Referee: Rade Obrenovič (Slovenia)

23 October 2025 3	Go Ahead Eagles (Netherlands)	2–1	(England) Aston Villa	Deventer, Netherlands
18:45 CEST	Nauber (yellow card) 14'; Suray 42'; Deijl 61'; Weijenberg (yellow card) 90'	Report	Guessand 4'; Buendía (penalty missed) 79'	Stadium: De Adelaarshorst; Attendance: 9,598; Referee: Filip Glova (Slovakia)

6 November 2025 4	Aston Villa (England)	2–0	(Israel) Maccabi Tel Aviv	Birmingham, England
20:00 GMT	Maatsen 45+1'; Malen 59' (pen.)	Report	Noy (yellow card) 29'; Sissokho (yellow card) 37'	Stadium: Villa Park; Attendance: 29,429; Referee: Julian Weinberger (Austria)

27 November 2025 5	Aston Villa (England)	2–1	(Switzerland) Young Boys	Birmingham, England
17:45 GMT	Malen 27', 42'; Onana (yellow card) 61'; Maatsen (yellow card) 90+7'	Report	Lauper (yellow card) 48'; Monteiro 90'	Stadium: Villa Park; Attendance: 32,158; Referee: Georgi Kabakov (Bulgaria)

11 December 2025 6	Basel (Switzerland)	1–2	(England) Aston Villa	Basel, Switzerland
21:00 CET	Daniliuc 34'; Leroy (yellow card) 72'; Otele (yellow card) 80'	Report	Guessand 12'; Cash (yellow card) 17'; Buendía (yellow card) 35'; Tielemans 53'; Konsa (yellow card) 84'; McGinn (yellow card) 87'	Stadium: St. Jakob-Park; Attendance: 27,509; Referee: Halil Umut Meler (Turkey)

22 January 2026 7	Fenerbahçe (Turkey)	0–1	(England) Aston Villa	Istanbul, Turkey
20:45 TRT	Nene (yellow card) 44'; Oosterwolde (yellow card) 45'; Müldür (yellow card) 79'; Škriniar (yellow card) 88'	Report	Sancho 25'; Digne (yellow card) 53'; Lindelöf (yellow card) 78'; Tielemans (yellow card) 88'; Bogarde (yellow card) 90+5'; Guessand (yellow card) 90+8'	Stadium: Şükrü Saracoğlu Stadium; Attendance: 41,414; Referee: Luís Godinho (Portugal)

29 January 2026 8	Aston Villa (England)	3–2	(Austria) Red Bull Salzburg	Birmingham, England
20:00 GMT	Rogers 64'; Mings 76'; Jimoh-Aloba 87'	Report	Lindelöf 33' (o.g.); Trummer (yellow card) 35'; Yeo 49'	Stadium: Villa Park; Attendance: 37,457; Referee: Rohit Saggi (Norway)

==== Knockout phase ====
===== Round of 16 =====
The draw for the round of 16 took place on 27 February 2026.

12 March 2026 First leg	Lille (France)	0–1	(England) Aston Villa	Villeneuve-d'Ascq, France
18:45 CET		Report	Watkins 61'; Martínez (yellow card) 88'; Digne (yellow card) 90+2'	Stadium: Stade Pierre-Mauroy; Attendance: 40,187; Referee: José María Sánchez Martínez (Spain)

19 March 2026 Second leg	Aston Villa (England)	2–0 (3–0 agg.)	(France) Lille	Birmingham, England
20:00 GMT	McGinn 54'; Douglas Luiz (yellow card) 72'; Bailey 86'	Report	Correia (yellow card) 25'	Stadium: Villa Park; Attendance: 37,583; Referee: Davide Massa (Italy)

===== Quarter-finals =====
The draw for the quarter-finals took place on 27 February 2026, after the draw for the round of 16.

9 April 2026 First leg	Bologna (Italy)	1–3	(England) Aston Villa	Bologna, Italy
21:00 CEST	Lucumí (yellow card) 14'; Pobega (yellow card) 65'; Rowe 90'	Report	Konsa 44'; Watkins 51', 90+4'; Rogers (yellow card) 85'	Stadium: Stadio Renato Dall'Ara; Attendance: 31,142; Referee: Sandro Schärer (Switzerland)

16 April 2026 Second leg	Aston Villa (England)	4–0 (7–1 agg.)	(Italy) Bologna	Birmingham, England
20:00 BST	Watkins 16'; Rogers (penalty missed) 25', 39'; Buendía 26'; Konsa 89'	Report	Bernardeschi (yellow card) 29'	Stadium: Villa Park; Attendance: 41,662; Referee: José María Sánchez Martínez (Spain)

===== Semi-finals =====
The draw for the semi-finals took place on 27 February 2026, after the draw for the quarter-finals.

30 April 2026 First leg	Nottingham Forest (England)	1–0	(England) Aston Villa	Nottingham, England
20:00 BST	Wood 71' (pen.)	Report	Tielemans (yellow card) 78'	Stadium: City Ground; Attendance: 29,790; Referee: João Pinheiro (Portugal)

7 May 2026 Second leg	Aston Villa (England)	4–0 (4–1 agg.)	(England) Nottingham Forest	Birmingham, England
20:00 BST	Watkins 36'; Buendía 58' (pen.); McGinn 77', 80'	Report	Morato (yellow card) 18'; Jair (yellow card) 45+3'	Stadium: Villa Park; Attendance: 43,028; Referee: Glenn Nyberg (Sweden)

===== Final =====
20 May 2026 Final	SC Freiburg (Germany)	0–3	(England) Aston Villa	Istanbul, Turkey
22:00 EEST	Treu (yellow card) 5'	Report	Buendía (yellow card) 15', (goal) 45+3'; Cash (yellow card) 21'; Tielemans 41'; Rogers 58'; McGinn (yellow card) 84'	Stadium: Beşiktaş Stadium; Attendance: 37,324; Referee: François Letexier (France)

== Squad statistics ==
=== Appearances ===
As of match played 24 May 2026

Players with no appearances are not included on the list, italics indicate a loaned in player.

No.	Pos	Nat	Player	Total		Premier League		FA Cup		EFL Cup		Europa League	
No.	Pos	Nat	Player	Apps	Goals	Apps	Goals	Apps	Goals	Apps	Goals	Apps	Goals
2	DF	(Poland) POL	Matty Cash	49	3	34+1	3	1	0	1	0	9+3	0
3	DF	(Sweden) SWE	Victor Lindelöf	28	0	11+6	0	1	0	0	0	9+1	0
4	DF	(England) ENG	Ezri Konsa	48	2	34	0	1	0	1	0	10+2	2
5	DF	(England) ENG	Tyrone Mings	22	1	15+2	0	0	0	0	0	3+2	1
6	MF	(England) ENG	Ross Barkley	23	3	7+14	3	1	0	0	0	0+1	0
7	MF	(Scotland) SCO	John McGinn	44	10	28+2	5	1	0	1	0	8+4	5
8	MF	(Belgium) BEL	Youri Tielemans	35	2	21+4	0	0+1	0	0	0	7+2	2
9	MF	(England) ENG	Harvey Elliott	9	1	1+3	0	0	0	1	1	1+3	0
10	MF	(Argentina) ARG	Emiliano Buendía	54	11	21+15	6	1+1	1	0+1	0	12+3	4
11	FW	(England) ENG	Ollie Watkins	55	21	33+4	16	0+2	0	0+1	0	10+5	5
12	DF	(France) FRA	Lucas Digne	44	0	21+10	0	1+1	0	0	0	9+2	0
14	DF	(Spain) ESP	Pau Torres	36	0	18+3	0	2	0	1	0	12	0
16	DF	(Spain) ESP	Andrés García	8	0	1+5	0	0+1	0	0	0	0+1	0
18	FW	(England) ENG	Tammy Abraham	16	3	2+10	2	1	1	0	0	1+2	0
19	FW	(England) ENG	Jadon Sancho	39	1	9+14	0	0+2	0	1	0	8+5	1
21	MF	(Brazil) BRA	Douglas Luiz	20	1	7+6	1	1	0	0	0	2+4	0
22	DF	(Netherlands) NED	Ian Maatsen	44	1	17+13	0	1+1	0	1	0	6+5	1
23	GK	(Argentina) ARG	Emiliano Martínez	44	0	32	0	0+1	0	0	0	11	0
24	MF	(Belgium) BEL	Amadou Onana	38	2	21+4	2	1	0	0	0	10+2	0
26	MF	(Netherlands) NED	Lamare Bogarde	44	0	11+17	0	2	0	1	0	8+5	0
27	MF	(England) ENG	Morgan Rogers	55	14	37	10	2	1	0+1	0	12+3	3
31	FW	(Jamaica) JAM	Leon Bailey	19	1	3+10	0	1	0	0	0	0+5	1
40	GK	(Netherlands) NED	Marco Bizot	14	0	6+1	0	2	0	1	0	4	0
44	MF	(France) FRA	Boubacar Kamara	26	1	17+1	1	1	0	0+1	0	2+4	0
47	FW	(Brazil) BRA	Alysson	3	0	0+3	0	0	0	0	0	0	0
53	MF	(England) ENG	George Hemmings	4	0	0+2	0	0	0	0	0	1+1	0
83	MF	(England) ENG	Bradley Burrowes	1	0	0+1	0	0	0	0	0	0	0
Player(s) who featured but departed the club on loan during the season:
17	FW	(Netherlands) NED	Donyell Malen	29	7	5+16	4	1	0	1	0	4+2	3
20	MF	(England) ENG	Jamaldeen Jimoh-Aloba	3	1	0+1	0	0	0	0+1	0	0+1	1
29	FW	(Ivory Coast) CIV	Evann Guessand	21	2	6+7	0	0	0	1	0	6+1	2
51	FW	(England) ENG	Kadan Young	1	0	0	0	0	0	0	0	0+1	0

=== Goals ===
As of match played 24 May 2026

Rank	Pos.	No.	Player	Premier League	FA Cup	EFL Cup	Europa League	Total
1	FW	11	(England) Ollie Watkins	16	0	0	5	21
2	MF	27	(England) Morgan Rogers	10	1	0	3	14
3	MF	10	(Argentina) Emiliano Buendía	6	1	0	4	11
4	MF	7	(Scotland) John McGinn	5	0	0	5	10
5	FW	17	(Netherlands) Donyell Malen	4	0	0	3	7
6	DF	2	(Poland) Matty Cash	3	0	0	0	3
6	MF	6	(England) Ross Barkley	3	0	0	0	3
6	FW	18	(England) Tammy Abraham	2	1	0	0	3
9	DF	4	(England) Ezri Konsa	0	0	0	2	2
9	MF	8	(Belgium) Youri Tielemans	0	0	0	2	2
9	MF	24	(Belgium) Amadou Onana	2	0	0	0	2
9	FW	29	(Ivory Coast) Evann Guessand	0	0	0	2	2
13	DF	5	(England) Tyrone Mings	0	0	0	1	1
13	MF	9	(England) Harvey Elliott	0	0	1	0	1
13	FW	19	(England) Jadon Sancho	0	0	0	1	1
13	MF	20	(England) Jamaldeen Jimoh-Aloba	0	0	0	1	1
13	MF	21	(Brazil) Douglas Luiz	1	0	0	0	1
13	DF	22	(Netherlands) Ian Maatsen	0	0	0	1	1
13	FW	31	(Jamaica) Leon Bailey	0	0	0	1	1
13	MF	44	(France) Boubacar Kamara	1	0	0	0	1
Own goals				3	0	0	0	3
Totals				56	3	1	31	91

=== Assists ===
As of match played 24 May 2026

Rank	Pos.	No.	Player	Premier League	FA Cup	EFL Cup	Europa League	Total
1	MF	27	(England) Morgan Rogers	6	0	0	5	11
2	MF	10	(Argentina) Emiliano Buendía	2	1	0	6	9
3	MF	7	(Scotland) John McGinn	4	0	1	2	7
3	MF	8	(Belgium) Youri Tielemans	4	0	0	3	7
3	DF	12	(France) Lucas Digne	6	0	0	1	7
6	FW	11	(England) Ollie Watkins	3	0	0	2	5
7	DF	2	(Poland) Matty Cash	3	0	0	1	4
7	MF	44	(France) Boubacar Kamara	3	0	0	1	4
9	FW	19	(England) Jadon Sancho	2	0	0	1	3
10	FW	17	(Netherlands) Donyell Malen	1	1	0	0	2
11	DF	3	(Sweden) Victor Lindelöf	1	0	0	0	1
11	MF	6	(England) Ross Barkley	1	0	0	0	1
11	DF	18	(England) Tammy Abraham	1	0	0	0	1
11	MF	21	(Brazil) Douglas Luiz	0	1	0	0	1
11	DF	22	(Netherlands) Ian Maatsen	1	0	0	0	1
11	GK	23	(Argentina) Emiliano Martínez	1	0	0	0	1
11	FW	29	(Ivory Coast) Evann Guessand	1	0	0	0	1
11	FW	31	(Jamaica) Leon Bailey	1	0	0	0	1
11	FW	51	(England) Kadan Young	0	0	0	1	1
Totals				40	3	1	26	68

=== Clean sheets ===
As of match played 24 May 2026

Rank	No.	Player	Premier League	FA Cup	EFL Cup	Europa League	Total
1	23	(Argentina) Emiliano Martínez	8	0	0	6	14
2	40	(Netherlands) Marco Bizot	2	0	0	3	5
Totals			10	0	0	9	19

=== Disciplinary record ===
As of match played 24 May 2026

Rank	No.	Pos.	Player	Premier League			FA Cup			EFL Cup			UEFA Europa League			Total		
Rank	No.	Pos.	Player	Yellow card	(yellow card) (yellow-red card)	Red card	Yellow card	(yellow card) (yellow-red card)	Red card	Yellow card	(yellow card) (yellow-red card)	Red card	Yellow card	(yellow card) (yellow-red card)	Red card	Yellow card	(yellow card) (yellow-red card)	Red card
1	40	GK	(Netherlands) Marco Bizot	2	0	0	0	0	1	0	0	0	1	0	0	3	0	1
2	4	DF	(England) Ezri Konsa	0	0	1	0	0	0	0	0	0	1	0	0	1	0	1
3	2	DF	(Poland) Matty Cash	9	0	0	0	0	0	1	0	0	3	0	0	13	0	0
4	10	MF	(Argentina) Emiliano Buendía	6	0	0	1	0	0	0	0	0	2	0	0	9	0	0
4	27	FW	(England) Morgan Rogers	7	0	0	0	0	0	0	0	0	2	0	0	9	0	0
6	7	MF	(Scotland) John McGinn	5	0	0	0	0	0	0	0	0	2	0	0	7	0	0
6	26	DF	(Netherlands) Lamare Bogarde	5	0	0	0	0	0	1	0	0	1	0	0	7	0	0
8	12	DF	(France) Lucas Digne	3	0	0	1	0	0	0	0	0	1	0	0	5	0	0
8	44	MF	(France) Boubacar Kamara	5	0	0	0	0	0	0	0	0	0	0	0	5	0	0
10	11	FW	(England) Ollie Watkins	4	0	0	0	0	0	0	0	0	0	0	0	4	0	0
10	24	MF	(Belgium) Amadou Onana	3	0	0	0	0	0	0	0	0	1	0	0	4	0	0
12	21	MF	(Brazil) Douglas Luiz	1	0	0	1	0	0	0	0	0	1	0	0	3	0	0
12	22	DF	(Netherlands) Ian Maatsen	2	0	0	0	0	0	0	0	0	1	0	0	3	0	0
12	23	GK	(Argentina) Emiliano Martínez	2	0	0	0	0	0	0	0	0	1	0	0	3	0	0
15	3	DF	(Sweden) Victor Lindelöf	0	0	0	0	0	0	0	0	0	1	0	0	2	0	0
15	8	MF	(Belgium) Youri Tielemans	0	0	0	0	0	0	0	0	0	2	0	0	2	0	0
15	29	FW	(Ivory Coast) Evann Guessand	0	0	0	0	0	0	1	0	0	1	0	0	2	0	0
18	5	DF	(England) Tyrone Mings	1	0	0	0	0	0	0	0	0	0	0	0	1	0	0
18	6	MF	(England) Ross Barkley	1	0	0	0	0	0	0	0	0	0	0	0	1	0	0
18	14	DF	(Spain) Pau Torres	1	0	0	0	0	0	0	0	0	0	0	0	1	0	0
18	16	DF	(Spain) Andrés García	0	0	0	1	0	0	0	0	0	0	0	0	1	0	0
18	31	FW	(Jamaica) Leon Bailey	1	0	0	0	0	0	0	0	0	0	0	0	1	0	0
Totals				58	0	1	4	0	1	2	0	0	24	0	0	86	0	2

== Club awards ==
=== Player of the Month award ===
Voted for by fans on Aston Villa's official website.

Month	Player
August	Not awarded
September	(Scotland) John McGinn
October	(Poland) Matty Cash
November	(Netherlands) Donyell Malen
December	(England) Morgan Rogers
January	(Argentina) Emiliano Buendía
February	(England) Tammy Abraham
March	(Scotland) John McGinn
April	(England) Ollie Watkins
May	

=== Goal of the Month award ===
Voted for by fans on Aston Villa's WhatsApp account.

Month	Player	Competition	Opponent
August	Not awarded		
September	(Poland) Matty Cash	Premier League	Sunderland
October	(Argentina) Emiliano Buendía	Premier League	Tottenham Hotspur
November	(France) Boubacar Kamara	Premier League	Wolverhampton Wanderers
December	(England) Morgan Rogers	Premier League	Manchester United
January	(England) Ollie Watkins	Premier League	Nottingham Forest
February	Not awarded		
March	(England) Ollie Watkins	UEFA Europa League	Lille
April			
May			

=== End of Season awards ===
Award	Winner
Supporter's Player of the Season	Harvey Elliott
Player's Player of the Season	
Young Player of the Season	
Goal of the Season	
