= Kadan Young =

English footballer (born 2006)

Personal information
- Full name: Kadan Christophe Young
- Date of birth: 19 January 2006 (age 20)
- Place of birth: Worcester, England
- Height: 5 ft 9 in (1.76 m)
- Position: Winger

Team information
- Current team: Annecy (on loan from Aston Villa)
- Number: 12

Youth career
- Phoenix United
- 2018–2024: Aston Villa

Senior career*
Years	Team	Apps	(Gls)
2024–	Aston Villa	0	(0)
2025	→ Royal Antwerp (loan)	7	(0)
2026	→ Reading (loan)	7	(0)
2026–	→ Annecy (loan)	7	(1)

International career^{‡}
2021	England U16	3	(0)
2023	England U17	4	(1)
2024	England U18	2	(1)
2024–2025	England U19	13	(2)
2026–	England U20	1	(0)
- * Club domestic league appearances and goals as of 21 September 2026 ‡ National team caps and goals as of 23:41, 31 March 2026 (UTC)

Kadan Christophe Young (born 19 January 2006) is an English professional footballer who plays as a winger for Ligue 2 club Annecy, on loan from Premier League club Aston Villa.

== Club career ==
Having started out with local club Phoenix United in Erdington, Young trialled with a host of professional sides before eventually joining Premier League side Aston Villa at under-13 level. He went on to sign a scholarship deal with the club in July 2022, and during the mid-season break for the 2022 FIFA World Cup, he was a surprise inclusion in Aston Villa's squad for a warm-weather training camp in December of the same year. Prior to the squad flying to Dubai for the training camp, he featured in a friendly against Cardiff City - his unofficial first team debut.

While on the tour, Young continued to feature in friendlies, playing ten minutes at the end of a 2–2 draw against Brighton & Hove Albion before being brought on as a half-time substitute for Arjan Raikhy against Chelsea. Playing on the right wing, he impressed against Chelsea's full-back, Marc Cucurella, earning plaudits for his performance in a 1–0 win. Following the conclusion of the warm-weather camp, he signed his first professional contract with the club in January 2023. On 18 September 2024, Young signed a long-term contract extension with Aston Villa.

On 24 September 2024, Young made his senior debut in a 2–1 away victory over Wycombe Wanderers in the EFL Cup.

On 3 February 2025, Young signed for Belgian Pro League club Royal Antwerp on loan until the end of the season. Young made his Belgian Pro League debut on 15 February, in a 2–1 victory over Kortrijk.

On 29 January 2026, Young made his European debut in the UEFA Europa League for Aston Villa, coming off the bench to assist Jamaldeen Jimoh-Aloba's winner in a 3–2 victory over Red Bull Salzburg.

On 2 February 2026, Young signed for League One club Reading on loan until the end of the season. Young made his English Football League debut on 14 February, in a 3–2 victory over Wycombe Wanderers.

On 8 July 2026, Young signed forLigue 2 club Annecy, who were part of Aston Villa's V Sports network, on a season-long loan.

== International career ==
Born in England, Young is of Jamaican descent and holds dual British and Jamaican citizenship. He has represented England at both under-16 and under-17 level. He was called up for the 2023 UEFA European Under-17 Championship, and scored the fourth goal in England's 4–2 win over Switzerland to clinch qualification to the 2023 FIFA U-17 World Cup.

On 20 May 2024, Young was called up for the England U18 squad for two matches against Northern Ireland & Morocco. He made a goalscoring debut in a 4–2 win over Northern Ireland at St. George's Park. Young an unused substitute for the victory over Morocco which won the Tri-Nations Trophy for England.

On 9 October 2024, Young made his England U19 debut during a 2–1 defeat to Portugal in Marbella. He was a member of England's squad at the 2025 UEFA European Under-19 Championship and started in their opening game of the tournament against Norway.

On 27 March 2026, Young made his England U20 debut during a 3-3 draw away to Italy.

== Career statistics ==
As of 18 September 2026

Appearances and goals by club, season and competition
Club	Season	League			National cup		League cup (Note: Includes EFL Cup)		Europe		Other		Total	
Club	Season	Division	Apps	Goals	Apps	Goals	Apps	Goals	Apps	Goals	Apps	Goals	Apps	Goals
Aston Villa	2024–25	Premier League	0	0	0	0	2	0	0	0	—		2	0
Aston Villa	2025–26	Premier League	0	0	0	0	0	0	1 (Note: Appearance in UEFA Europa League)	0	—		1	0
Aston Villa	2026–27	Premier League	0	0	0	0	0	0	0	0	—		0	0
Aston Villa	Total		0	0	0	0	2	0	1	0	0	0	3	0
Royal Antwerp (loan)	2024–25	Belgian Pro League	7	0	0	0	—		—		0	0	7	0
Reading (loan)	2025–26	League One	7	0	—		—		—		—		7	0
Annecy (loan)	2026–27	Ligue 2	7	1	0	0	—		—		—		7	1
Career total			21	1	0	0	2	0	1	0	0	0	24	1

== Honours ==
Aston Villa

- UEFA Europa League: 2025–26

Aston Villa U21s

- Birmingham Senior Cup: 2023–24

England U18s

- Tri-Nations Trophy: 2024
