= Roberto Olabe =

Roberto Olabe may refer to:

- Roberto Olabe (footballer, born 1967), Spanish former football goalkeeper and manager
- Roberto Olabe (footballer, born 1996), Spanish professional footballer, son of the above
