= Ranjan Neelakandan =

Swiss footballer (born 2005)

Personal information
- Date of birth: 20 January 2005 (age 21)
- Place of birth: Bellinzona, Switzerland
- Height: 1.82 m (6 ft 0 in)
- Positions: Winger; forward

Team information
- Current team: Vaduz (on loan from Annecy)
- Number: 16

Youth career
- AS Novazzano
- –2023: Team Ticino
- AS Novazzano

Senior career*
Years	Team	Apps	(Gls)
2022	Chiasso	2	(0)
2023	Lugano U21	3	(0)
2023–2024	Bellinzona	33	(2)
2025–	Annecy	8	(0)
2026	→ Yverdon-Sport (loan)	17	(1)
2026–	→ Vaduz (loan)	0	(0)

International career^{‡}
2023–2024	Switzerland U19	6	(0)
2024–	Switzerland U20	9	(0)
- * Club domestic league appearances and goals as of 26 May 2026 ‡ National team caps and goals as of 13 October 2025

Ranjan Neelakandan (born 20 January 2005) is a Swiss professional footballer who plays as a midfielder or forward for Liechtensteiner Swiss Super League club Vaduz, on loan from Ligue 2 club Annecy.

== Early life ==
Neelakandan was born on 20 January 2005. Born in Switzerland, he is of Sri Lankan Tamil descent through his parents.

== Club career ==
Neelakandan started his career with Swiss side Chiasso in 2022, where he made two league appearances and scored zero goals. One year later, he signed for Swiss side Lugano U21, where he made three league appearances and scored zero goals.

Ahead of the 2023–24 season, he signed for Swiss side Bellinzona, where he made thirty-three league appearances and scored two goals. Following his stint there, he signed for French side Annecy in 2025.

On 20 January 2026, Neelakandan returned to Switzerland and joined Yverdon-Sport on loan.

== International career ==
Neelakandan is a Switzerland youth international. During March 2024 he played for the Switzerland national under-19 football team for 2025 UEFA European Under-19 Championship qualification.
