= Jamaldeen Jimoh-Aloba =

English footballer (born 2006)

Personal information
- Full name: Jamaldeen Jimoh-Aloba
- Date of birth: 2 October 2006 (age 20)
- Place of birth: Birmingham, England
- Height: 6 ft 1 in (1.85 m)
- Position: Attacking midfielder

Team information
- Current team: Aston Villa
- Number: 20

Youth career
- 2013–2023: West Bromwich Albion
- 2023–2025: Aston Villa

Senior career*
Years	Team	Apps	(Gls)
2024–	Aston Villa	1	(0)
2026	→ West Bromwich Albion (loan)	10	(0)

International career^{‡}
2021–2022	England U16	4	(0)
2022–2023	England U17	7	(1)
2024	England U18	3	(0)
2025–	England U20	3	(0)
- * Club domestic league appearances and goals as of 10:25, 27 April 2026 (UTC) ‡ National team caps and goals as of 23:38, 31 March 2026 (UTC)

Jamaldeen Jimoh-Aloba (born 2 October 2006) is an English professional footballer who plays as an attacking midfielder for Premier League club Aston Villa. Jimoh-Aloba is a product of the West Bromwich Albion and Aston Villa academies and has represented England regularly at youth international level up to U20 level.

He made his senior debut for Aston Villa in the EFL Cup in September 2024 and won the 2024–25 FA Youth Cup with their under-18 side in May 2025. His first senior goal was the match winner on his European debut in January 2026 against FC Red Bull Salzburg in the final league stage match of the 2025–26 UEFA Europa League.

== Club career ==
Jimoh-Aloba began his career at the academy of West Bromwich Albion. Despite being linked with a transfer to Chelsea, on 26 August 2023, Jimoh-Aloba signed for Aston Villa. The transfer was reported to be for a fee around £1 million. On 10 October 2023, Jimoh-Aloba signed his first professional contract.

On 24 September 2024, Jimoh-Aloba made his senior debut as a substitute in an EFL Cup win away to Wycombe Wanderers. On 8 October 2024, Jimoh-Aloba signed a new "long-term" contract with Aston Villa. On 4 January 2025, Jimoh-Aloba featured in a Premier League squad for the first time, as an unused substitute in a 2–1 victory over Leicester City.

On 5 May 2025, Jimoh-Aloba scored a goal in the FA Youth Cup final, which ended as a 3–1 victory against Manchester City U18s.

On 30 December 2025, Jimoh-Aloba made his Premier League debut for Aston Villa during the 4–1 loss against Arsenal as a second-half substitute.

On 29 January 2026, Jimoh-Aloba made his European debut as a substitute, scoring the winning goal from a Kadan Young pass during the 3–2 victory against RB Salzburg in Aston Villa’s final league phase game in the UEFA Europa League.

=== Loan to West Bromwich Albion ===
On 2 February 2026, Jimoh-Aloba re-joined Championship side West Bromwich Albion on loan until the end of the season.

== International career ==
Born in England, Jimoh-Aloba is of Nigerian descent. He has represented England at various youth levels.

On 5 September 2025, Jimoh-Aloba made his U20 debut during a 2–1 defeat to Italy at the SMH Group Stadium.

== Career statistics ==
As of match played 18 August 2026

Appearances and goals by club, season and competition
Club	Season	League			FA Cup		EFL Cup		Europe		Other		Total	
Club	Season	Division	Apps	Goals	Apps	Goals	Apps	Goals	Apps	Goals	Apps	Goals	Apps	Goals
Aston Villa U21	2024–25	—			—		—		—		3 (Note: Appearance(s) in EFL Trophy)	1	3	1
Aston Villa U21	2025–26	—			—		—		—		1	0	1	0
Aston Villa U21	2026–27	—			—		—		—		1	0	1	0
Aston Villa U21	Total		—		—		—		—		5	1	5	1
Aston Villa	2024–25	Premier League	0	0	1	0	2	0	0	0	—		3	0
Aston Villa	2025–26	Premier League	1	0	0	0	1	0	1 (Note: Appearance in UEFA Europa League)	1	—		3	1
Aston Villa	2026–27	Premier League	0	0	0	0	0	0	0	0	—		0	0
Aston Villa	Total		1	0	1	0	3	0	1	1	—		6	1
West Bromwich Albion (loan)	2025–26	Championship	10	0	1	0	—		—		—		11	0
Career total			11	0	2	0	3	0	1	1	5	1	22	2

== Honours ==
Aston Villa

- UEFA Europa League: 2025-26

Aston Villa U21

- Birmingham Senior Cup: 2023–24

Aston Villa U18

- FA Youth Cup: 2024–25
