= Thibault Rambaud =

French footballer (born 1997)

Personal information
- Date of birth: 19 April 1997 (age 29)
- Place of birth: Cholet, France
- Height: 1.92 m (6 ft 4 in)
- Position: Forward

Team information
- Current team: Annecy
- Number: 9

Youth career
- –2015: Chamois Niortais

Senior career*
Years	Team	Apps	(Gls)
2015–2019	Bressuire	74	(25)
2019	Le Mans II	7	(2)
2019	Le Mans	0	(0)
2020–2021	Vannes OC	7	(1)
2021–2023	Canet Roussillon	53	(19)
2023–2024	GOAL FC	26	(6)
2024–2025	Boulogne	28	(11)
2025–	Annecy	28	(7)
- * Club domestic league appearances and goals as of 11 May 2026

Thibault Rambaud (born 19 April 1997) is a French professional footballer who plays as a forward for Ligue 2 club Annecy.

== Club career ==
On 26 June 2025, Rambaud signed a three-season contract with Annecy in Ligue 2.

== Career statistics ==
=== Club ===
As of 10 November 2019.

Club	Season	League			Coupe de France		Coupe de la Ligue		Other		Total	
Club	Season	Division	Apps	Goals	Apps	Goals	Apps	Goals	Apps	Goals	Apps	Goals
Bressuire	2015–16	Championnat de France amateur 2	4	0	0	0	–		0	0	4	0
Bressuire	2016–17	Championnat de France amateur 2	25	5	0	0	–		0	0	25	5
Bressuire	2017–18	Championnat National 3	24	9	1	0	–		0	0	25	9
Bressuire	2018–19	Championnat National 3	21	11	0	0	–		0	0	21	11
Bressuire	Total		74	25	1	0	0	0	0	0	75	25
Le Mans II	2019–20	Championnat National 3	7	2	0	0	–		0	0	7	2
Le Mans	2019–20	Ligue 2	0	0	0	0	1	0	0	0	1	0
Career total			81	27	1	0	1	0	0	0	83	27
