= Laurent Guyot =

French footballer and manager (born 1969)

Personal information
- Date of birth: 17 December 1969 (age 56)
- Place of birth: Bourg-la-Reine, France
- Position: Centre-back

Team information
- Current team: Annecy (head coach)

Youth career
- 1985–1988: Nantes

Senior career*
Years	Team	Apps	(Gls)
1988–1998	Nantes	191	(3)
1998–1999	Toulouse	15	(0)
1999–2002	Guingamp	81	(2)
Total		287	(5)

International career
1990–1991	France U21	3	(0)

Managerial career
- 2005–2009: Nantes (Youth academy)
- 2009–2010: Boulogne
- 2011–2013: Sedan
- 2015–2018: Toronto FC (Academy Director)
- 2018: Toronto FC II
- 2018–2019: Cercle Brugge
- 2019–2021: Boulogne
- 2021–: Annecy
- * Club domestic league appearances and goals

Laurent Guyot (French: [loʁɑ̃ ɡɥijo]; born 17 December 1969) is a French professional football manager and former player who is the head coach of Ligue 2 club Annecy.

He played as a defender mostly for Nantes, winning Division 1 in 1995, and also represented Toulouse and Guingamp. He began his managerial career with Boulogne in Ligue 1, leading that club and two others in Ligue 2. Abroad, he had brief spells at Toronto FC II in the USL Championship and Cercle Brugge in the Belgian Pro League.

== Playing career ==
Guyot played as a central defender, mainly for Nantes, where he won the Division 1 title in 1995. He also played for Toulouse and Guingamp.

== Coaching career ==
=== Early years ===
Guyot was the director of Nantes's youth academy from 2005 to 2009, but left after disagreements with president Waldemar Kita. He was head coach of the U-16 and U-17 French national teams.

=== Boulogne ===
On 9 June 2009, Guyot signed a two-year deal at Boulogne, replacing Philippe Montanier who had taken the club from the fourth-tier Championnat de France Amateur to Ligue 1 in five seasons. He chose former Nanets teammate Serge Le Dizet as his assistant coach. On his debut, he lost 3–0 at Rennes on 8 August. His team reached the quarter-finals of the Coupe de France in his first season, but lost 3–1 away at fourth-tier Quevilly.

Boulogne came 19th and were relegated back to Ligue 2 for 2010–11. Guyot was sacked on 27 December, having won four and drawn 11 of the 19 games in the first half of the season.

=== Sedan ===
On 26 May 2011, Guyot was named as the manager of Sedan in the same league, signing a two-year contract. On his debut on 23 July, he won 4–1 at home to Monaco in the first round of the Coupe de la Ligue, followed by victories in the next rounds against his former employers Boulogne and Nantes in a run to the last 16. In his first season, the Sangliers finished one place and five points off promotion, but they were relegated 14 points from safety in 2013. The club's owner, Pascal Urano, stopped funding the team during their promotion push in 2012 and instead sold their best players before putting the club into liquidation in August 2013 and thereby being relegated a further tier to the fourth.

=== Toronto FC and Cercle Brugge ===
On 29 June 2015, it was announced that Guyot would become the Academy Director at Toronto FC, a role that had been vacant since Greg Vanney was promoted to the first team the previous year.

Guyot was unveiled as the new Toronto FC II coach on 26 January 2018, succeeding Jason Bent. Having achieved only two draws in 12 USL Championship games, he left on 1 June, citing a new opportunity in Europe.

On 7 June 2018, Guyot was hired by newly promoted Belgian Pro League club Cercle Brugge. The following 2 May, having avoided relegation in his only season, he was not maintained.

=== Boulogne return and Annecy ===
Guyot returned to Boulogne for a second spell in June 2019. He left at the end of the 2020–21 season, and five days later was announced as head coach of fellow Championnat National side Annecy. He led the club back to the second tier for the first time since 1993 in his first year, as runners-up to Laval.

In the 2022–23 Coupe de France, Guyot led Annecy to their first quarter-final since 1942 and first semi-final of all time, with penalty shootout wins away to Paris FC and Marseille.

== Honours ==
=== Player ===
Nantes

- Division 1: 1994–95
- Coupe de France runner-up: 1992–93
