= Emiliano Buendía =

Argentine footballer (born 1996)

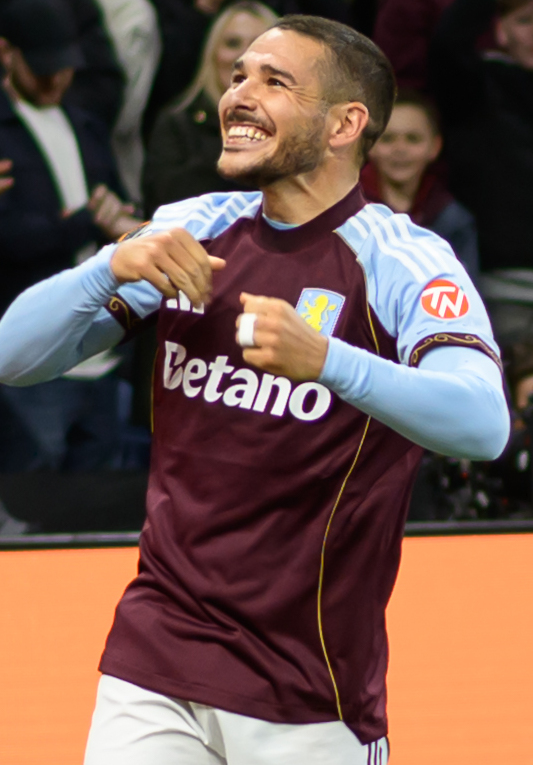
- Buendía playing for Aston Villa in 2026

Personal information
- Full name: Emiliano Buendía Stati
- Date of birth: 25 December 1996 (age 29)
- Place of birth: Mar del Plata, Argentina
- Height: 1.72 m (5 ft 8 in)
- Positions: Attacking midfielder; left winger

Team information
- Current team: Aston Villa
- Number: 10

Youth career
- 2009: Cadetes de San Martín
- 2009–2010: Real Madrid
- 2010–2014: Getafe

Senior career*
Years	Team	Apps	(Gls)
2014–2015	Getafe B	34	(7)
2014–2018	Getafe	35	(3)
2017–2018	→ Cultural Leonesa (loan)	40	(6)
2018–2021	Norwich City	113	(24)
2021–	Aston Villa	131	(16)
2025	→ Bayer Leverkusen (loan)	11	(2)

International career^{‡}
2014	Spain U19	3	(0)
2015	Argentina U20	3	(1)
2022–	Argentina	2	(0)
- * Club domestic league appearances and goals as of 21 November 2026 ‡ National team caps and goals as of 14 November 2025

Emiliano Buendía Stati (born 25 December 1996) is an Argentine professional footballer who plays as an attacking midfielder or winger for Premier League club Aston Villa and the Argentina national team.

Buendía's senior career began at Spanish club Getafe with whom he spent four years, including a short spell with Cultural Leonesa, before he moved to England, joining Norwich City in 2018. His first season at Norwich saw the club achieve promotion to the Premier League. However, the next season saw them relegated back to the Championship. In his final season at Norwich, he won the EFL Championship Player of the Season award.

Buendía transferred to Aston Villa in 2021. After falling out of favour by the end of the 2024–25 season, he re-emerged as a focal player in the 2025–26 season. In 2026, he won the Europa League, being named man of the match in the final.

== Club career ==
=== Getafe ===
Born in Mar del Plata, Argentina, Buendía moved to Spain at the age of eleven to join the academy of Real Madrid. After two years, he moved to Getafe. On 30 March 2014, still a junior, he made his senior debut, starting for the reserves in a 2–1 away win against Puerta Bonita in the Segunda División B. He scored his first goal on 13 April, with the first of a 2–0 win away to Peña Sport. Buendía started the 2014–15 season still with the reserve team and in the third level, notably scoring twice in a 3–0 home win over Fuenlabrada. He played his first match as a professional on 5 December 2014, as a substitute for Ángel Lafita in a 3–0 home win against Eibar in the Copa del Rey.

Buendía made his La Liga debut on 1 February 2015, coming on as a late substitute in a 1–0 away loss against Almería. He scored his first goal in the same competition on 27 September, with the second in a 3–0 home win against Levante. On 5 July 2016, despite suffering relegation with Getafe at the end of the 2015–16 La Liga season, Buendía signed a new five-year contract with the club.

==== Loan to Cultural Leonesa ====
On 27 July 2017, he was loaned to fellow second-tier club Cultural Leonesa, for one year.

=== Norwich City ===
==== 2018–2020 ====
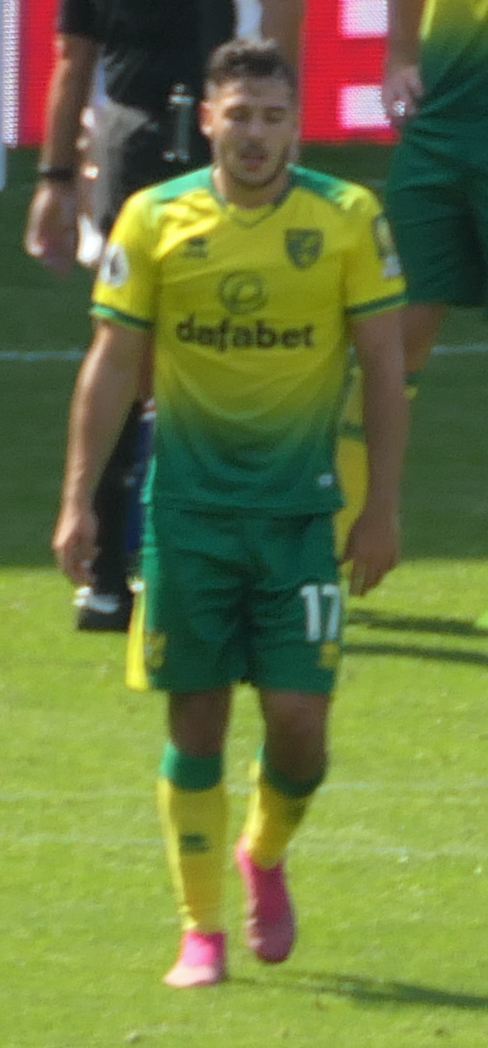
Buendía playing for Norwich City in 2019

On 8 June 2018, Buendía signed a four-year deal with EFL Championship club Norwich City. He scored his first goal for Norwich in a 1–0 win over Brentford on 27 October, and played an integral role as one of the main creative attacking players in the team – scoring 7 further league goals as the club swept to promotion to the Premier League and the Championship title. Fans subsequently voted him into third place in the annual Player of the Season awards.

On 8 July 2019, he signed a new five-year contract to stay at Norwich until June 2024. During December 2019, Buendía created 29 chances for his teammates, which was the most chances created by a player in a single month in the Premier League since the stat began to be recorded in 2003–04.

On 7 July 2020, Buendía scored his first goal in the Premier League, coming in a 2–1 away defeat to Watford. Norwich would lose their next match to West Ham United, a result which confirmed their relegation back to the Championship after only a single season in the top flight.

==== 2020–21 season: Championship Player of the Season ====
On 6 April 2021, Buendía scored once and provided three assists in a 7–0 victory over Huddersfield Town. On 17 April, Norwich secured automatic promotion back into the Premier League, and secured the Championship title on 1 May with a 4–1 win over Reading.

On 29 April, following a campaign in which Buendía scored 15 league goals and added a further 16 assists, he won the EFL Championship Player of the Season award. He was also named as Norwich's Player of the Season, becoming only the fourth player from outside the British Isles to win the award.

=== Aston Villa ===
==== 2021–2025 ====
On 7 June 2021, it was announced that an agreement had been reached for 24-year-old Buendía to be transferred to fellow Premier League club Aston Villa once he had returned from international duty with Argentina. The deal was completed on 10 June. The transfer fee was believed to be worth around £33 million, rising to £38 million with potential bonuses, and was confirmed to be both Aston Villa's record signing and Norwich City's record sale. Buendía made his debut on 14 August 2021, in a 3–2 away loss to Watford on the opening day of the 2021–22 season. He scored his first goal for Villa on 28 August 2021, in a 1–1 draw at home to Brentford.

On 9 August 2023, on the eve of the Premier League season, Buendía suffered what was described as a "significant knee injury" in training and would require a scan and treatment from a specialist. The injury was confirmed to be anterior cruciate ligament injury which required surgery and meant that Buendía missed the entirety of the 2023–24 season. Buendía returned to training in May 2024 after nine months out. Buendía's return to football came on 27 July 2024, almost a year to the day of his injury, in a pre-season friendly against Columbus Crew. Buendía made his Premier League comeback on 14 September 2024, as a late substitute in a 3–2 victory over Everton, after appearing as one of the permitted overage players in Aston Villa's U21 team in the EFL Trophy earlier in the month, scoring twice in a 3–2 victory over Fleetwood Town.

==== Loan to Bayer Leverkusen ====
On 29 January 2025, Aston Villa announced that Buendía had signed a contract extension with the club, and would join Bundesliga club Bayer Leverkusen on loan until the end of the season.

==== 2025–26 season: Europa League victory ====
Despite being told he could leave in the summer, at the start of the 2025–26 season, Buendía re-established himself as a first team regular for Aston Villa. He scored three times in the first 12 games of the season, including finishing off a team goal in a 2–1 away victory over Tottenham Hotspur which was awarded BBC Goal of the Month for October. On 7 November 2025, the same goal was awarded the official Premier League Goal of the Month. On 7 May 2026, he netted a goal in a 4–0 win over Nottingham Forest in the Europa League semi-final second leg, helping his team secure a 4–1 aggregate victory and a place in the final. In the Europa League final, he scored a goal and provided an assist in a 3–0 victory over SC Freiburg, earning the Man of the Match award. Ben Fisher of The Guardian called Buendía's goal "a left-foot peach into the top corner". After the match, Buendía said: "I've had some very bad moments, I've been very low, injuries, finding myself in a difficult momentum to play more often, but I kept believing in myself all the time. ... I always trusted my work ethic and also I always thought I could be important for this club and team. I have to enjoy it."

== International career ==
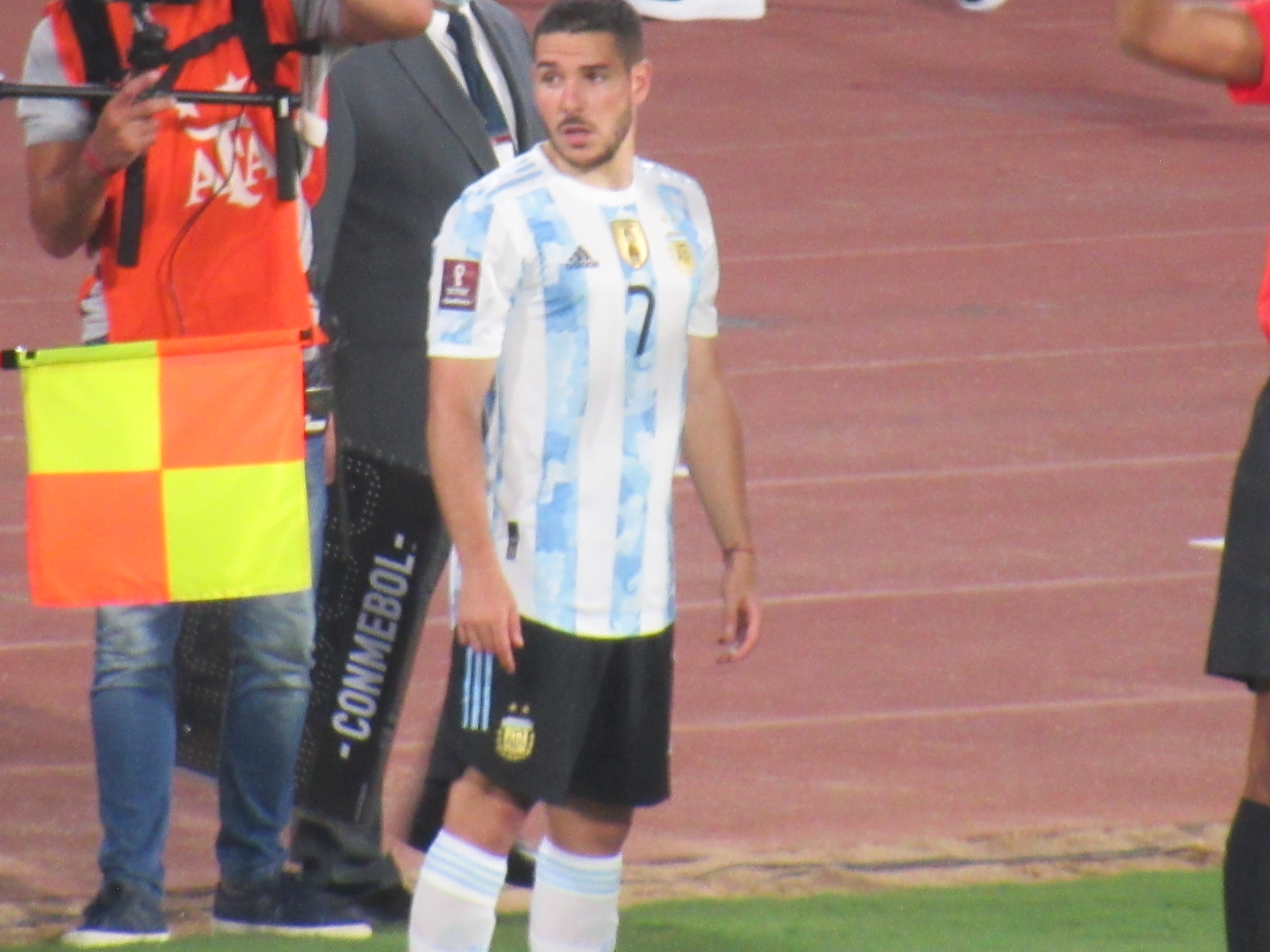
Buendía about to make his debut for Argentina in 2022

On 16 September 2014, Buendía was called up to the Spain under-19s. On 29 April of the following year, he was called up by Argentina under-20s for 2015 FIFA U-20 World Cup, and joined the latter's training camp on 5 May 2015. In May 2021, Buendía was called up to the Argentina senior squad for the first time. On 1 February 2022, he made his debut in a 1–0 home victory over Colombia.

After a three-year absence, Buendía was called up to the Argentina side again in November 2025 for a friendly against Angola. On 14 November, Buendía came off the bench in a 2–0 victory.

== Career statistics ==
=== Club ===
As of match played 21 November 2026

Appearances and goals by club, season and competition
Club	Season	League			National cup (Note: Includes Copa del Rey, FA Cup, DFB-Pokal)		League cup (Note: Includes EFL Cup)		Europe		Other		Total	
Club	Season	Division	Apps	Goals	Apps	Goals	Apps	Goals	Apps	Goals	Apps	Goals	Apps	Goals
Getafe B	2013–14	Segunda División B	5	2	—		—		—		—		5	2
Getafe B	2014–15	Segunda División B	26	5	—		—		—		—		26	5
Getafe B	2015–16	Segunda División B	3	0	—		—		—		—		3	0
Getafe B	Total		34	7	—		—		—		—		34	7
Getafe	2014–15	La Liga	6	0	5	0	—		—		—		11	0
Getafe	2015–16	La Liga	17	1	0	0	—		—		—		18	1
Getafe	2016–17	Segunda División	12	2	0	0	—		—		0	0	13	2
Getafe	Total		35	3	5	0	—		—		0	0	40	3
Cultural Leonesa (loan)	2017–18	Segunda División	40	6	2	1	—		—		—		42	7
Norwich City	2018–19	Championship	38	8	0	0	3	0	—		—		41	8
Norwich City	2019–20	Premier League	36	1	2	0	1	0	—		—		39	1
Norwich City	2020–21	Championship	39	15	2	0	0	0	—		—		41	15
Norwich City	Total		113	24	4	0	4	0	—		—		121	24
Aston Villa	2021–22	Premier League	35	4	1	0	1	0	—		—		37	4
Aston Villa	2022–23	Premier League	38	5	1	0	2	0	—		—		41	5
Aston Villa	2023–24	Premier League	0	0	0	0	0	0	0	0	—		0	0
Aston Villa	2024–25	Premier League	12	0	1	0	2	1	4 (Note: Appearances in UEFA Champions League)	0	—		19	1
Aston Villa	2025–26	Premier League	36	6	2	1	1	0	15 (Note: Appearances in UEFA Europa League)	4	—		54	11
Aston Villa	2026–27	Premier League	10	1	0	0	2	0	3	2	1 (Note: Appearance in UEFA Super Cup)	0	16	3
Aston Villa	Total		131	16	5	1	8	1	22	6	1	0	167	24
Bayer Leverkusen (loan)	2024–25	Bundesliga	11	2	1	0	—		2	0	—		14	2
Career total			364	58	16	1	12	1	24	6	1	0	418	67

=== International ===
As of match played 14 November 2025

Appearances and goals by national team and year
National team	Year	Apps	Goals
Argentina	2022	1	0
Argentina	2023	0	0
Argentina	2024	0	0
Argentina	2025	1	0
Total		2	0

== Honours ==
Getafe

- Segunda División play-offs: 2017

Norwich City

- EFL Championship: 2018–19, 2020–21

Aston Villa

- UEFA Europa League: 2025–26

Individual

- EFL Championship Player of the Season: 2020–21
- PFA Team of the Year: 2020–21 Championship
- EFL Championship Team of the Season: 2020–21
- Norwich City Player of the Season: 2020–21
- BBC Goal of the Month: October 2025
- Premier League Goal of the Month: October 2025
- UEFA Europa League Team of the Season: 2025–26
