= V Sports =

British-based holding company

- Type: Holding company
- Industry: Sports; Sports services
- Founded: 2018 as NSWE
- Founder: Nassef Sawiris; Wesley Edens
- Key people: Francesco Calvo (President of Business Operations); Matthew Kidson (Director of Global Development)
- Owner: Nassef Sawiris (34%); Wesley Edens (34%); Atairos (32%)
- Subsidiaries: Aston Villa (100%); Aston Villa Women (90%); Vitória SC (46%); Real Unión (25%); FC Annecy (30%)

V Sports is a holding company that administers multiple association football clubs. The company is jointly owned by Egyptian billionaire Nassef Sawiris, American billionaire Wes Edens, and American investment firm Atairos. The company derives its name from Aston Villa, the flagship football club, and acts as the club's parent company.

In addition to the men's and women's sides of Aston Villa, V Sports also owns a 46% stake in Portuguese side Vitória S.C., a 25% stake in Spanish side Real Unión, and a 30% stake in French side FC Annecy. V Sports additionally has partnership agreements with ZED FC of the Egyptian Premier League, Vissel Kobe of the J1 League, and ASEC Mimosas of Ligue 1 (Ivory Coast). The clubs in the V Sports network share scouting resources, coaching methodologies, and youth development strategies.

== History ==
The company was founded as NSWE in July 2018 ahead of Edens and Sawiris' purchase of a 55% stake in EFL Championship club Aston Villa. This was subsequently increased to a full purchase of the club in August 2019, following Aston Villa's promotion to the Premier League. NSWE was rebranded to V Sports in 2021, as Sawiris and Edens began to pursue a multi-club model.

As part of the initial rebranding into V Sports, a youth partnership agreement between Aston Villa and Egyptian Premier League club ZED FC, owned by Sawiris' brother Naguib Sawiris, was announced in December 2021. In April 2023, a further partnership agreement between ZED FC and all V Sports clubs (including Vitória SC) was announced. This partnership has seen Aston Villa sign ZED FC youth player and Egyptian Under-17 international, Omar Khedr, in August 2023. Furthermore, A V Sports youth academy investment in Senegal was known to exist by late 2022.

In February 2023, V Sports would complete the purchase of a 46% stake in Primeira Liga club Vitória S.C. Sawiris noted that discussions had been ongoing regarding an investment into Vitória since 2021. However, V Sports was required by UEFA to reduce its share in Vitória from 46% to 29% in June 2023, as both clubs were in the qualifying rounds of the 2023-24 UEFA Europa Conference League. In October 2026, V Sports' share in Vitoria was restored to 46%, with Aston Villa's President of Football Operations Roberto Olabe joining Vitoria's board of directors.

V Sports had entered formal discussions with Major League Soccer (MLS) regarding forming a club in Las Vegas in early 2022, with the name Las Vegas Villains trademarked. The 30th team in the league was instead awarded to San Diego in May 2023.

In May 2023, Chris Heck, former president of the Philadelphia 76ers, was announced as the President of Business Operations for both V Sports and Aston Villa. In October 2023, former director of the 2022 Commonwealth Games in Birmingham, Matthew Kidson joined as Director of Global Development.

On 19 October 2023, V Sports announced a partnership between its member clubs and Japanese club Vissel Kobe.

On 28 November 2023, V Sports announced a partnership with Spanish club Real Unión: the club owned by the family of Aston Villa manager Unai Emery. By 19 December 2024, Real Unión's shareholders ratified an agreement that would see V Sports purchase an approximate 25% stake in the club.

On 15 December 2023, V Sports announced an agreement with Comcast-backed American investment firm Atairos to invest in V Sports. The agreement, which valued V Sports at more than £500 million, saw Atairos obtain a 20% stake in the wider V Sports holding company. The deal with Atairos was finalised on 12 April 2024. By October 2024, investment within V Sports had seen Atairo's stake increase to roughly 32%.

In June 2025, V Sports announced the appointment of Francesco Calvo as President of Business Operations from Juventus, having also previously held executive roles at Roma and Barcelona. Calvo would replace the outgoing Chris Heck, who departed the organisation in April 2025 to pursue a similar role at LIV Golf.

On 2 October 2025, Aston Villa, alongside the announcement of the signing of ASEC Mimosas youth player Mohamed Kone, announced the formation of a 'close relationship' with ASEC Mimosas; the partnership would see ASEC invited to play games within the UK and at ZED FC in Egypt.

On 21 October 2025, V Sports announced the sale of a 10% stake in Aston Villa Women to Marc Zahr, co-president of Blue Owl Capital.

On 2 June 2026, Ligue 2 side FC Annecy announced that V Sports had purchased a 30% stake in the club. Aston Villa had developed an informal partnership with FC Annecy over the prior year, following the loans of Aston Villa academy players Triston Rowe and Travis Patterson.

== V Sports owned clubs ==
Location of clubs with shares held by V Sports
- (England) Aston Villa (100%) – V Sports have full ownership of the club, with Sawiris and Edens acting as club chairmen. Considered the flagship club.
- (England) Aston Villa Women (90%) – Marc Zahr, co-president of Blue Owl Capital, purchased a 10% stake in Aston Villa's women's team in 2025.
- (Portugal) Vitória S.C (46%) – V Sports originally purchased a 46% stake in 2023, albeit reduced to 29% the same year to comply with UEFA rules: the original 46% stake was restored in 2026.
- (Spain) Real Unión (25%) – An initial collaboration starting in November 2023 progressing to ownership of a 25% stake in the club by December 2024, Real Unión are owned by the family of Aston Villa manager Unai Emery.
- (France) FC Annecy (30%) – Initially an informal partnership with Aston Villa following the loan of Triston Rowe, V Sports purchased a 30% stake in the club in June 2026.

== V Sports partner clubs ==
- (Egypt) ZED FC – Collaboration agreement to develop younger talents, in partnership with ZED's academy in Senegal. Aston Villa provide assistance in the technical and physical development of academy players, offer training to coaches and give access to their scouting network. Additionally, ZED can send young players to train with Aston Villa's youth academy and get experience of European football at a young age. In exchange, other V Sports clubs have access to sign those players ahead of other teams, which was evident with the transfer of Omar Khedr to Aston Villa, which was announced in August 2023, and became official in July 2024.
- (Japan) Vissel Kobe – Bilateral collaboration agreement where the two clubs create a development framework for players and coaching staff, with an encouragement to share ideas and coaching techniques, in order to increase the development of youth players at both teams' academies. Players from Vissel's Under-18 squad, such as Kaito Yamada and Kento Hamasaki have been sent to train at Aston Villa's Bodymoor Heath Training Ground.
- (Ivory Coast) ASEC Mimosas – As part of the transfer agreement for youngster Mohamed Koné from ASEC Mimosas to Aston Villa, V Sports also established a relationship with the Ivorian club, where they were invited to train at Aston Villa's Bodymoor Heath Training Ground and play friendlies against Aston Villa as well as traveling to Cairo to play in a tournament with ZED FC. In October 2025, Aston Villa also arranged for 16-year-old striker Ibrahim Dosso to be transferred to their academy when he turned 18.
- (United States) Columbus Crew – After Aston Villa played a pre-season friendly against Columbus Crew in 2024, Aston Villa and Columbus Crew have shared ideas regarding scouting systems, coaching and recruitment methods. Colombus Crew technical director Marc Nicholls has previously visited Birmingham as part of the relationship.
