= Triston Rowe =

English footballer (born 2006)

Personal information
- Full name: Triston Tye Rowe
- Date of birth: 2 October 2006 (age 20)
- Place of birth: Sandwell, England
- Position: Defender

Team information
- Current team: Royal Charleroi (on loan from Aston Villa)
- Number: 2

Youth career
- –2020: West Bromwich Albion
- 2020–2025: Aston Villa

Senior career*
Years	Team	Apps	(Gls)
2025–	Aston Villa	0	(0)
2025–2026	→ Annecy (loan)	30	(1)
2026–	→ Royal Charleroi (loan)	4	(0)

International career^{‡}
2022	England U16	1	(0)
2023–2024	England U18	9	(0)
2024–2025	England U19	7	(0)
2025	England U20	1	(0)
- * Club domestic league appearances and goals as of 09:55, 14 October 2026 (UTC) ‡ National team caps and goals as of 15:24, 15 November 2025 (UTC)

Triston Tye Rowe (born 2 October 2006) is an English professional footballer who plays as a defender for Belgian Pro League club Royal Charleroi, on loan from Premier League club Aston Villa.

== Club career ==
Rowe joined Aston Villa at the age of 14 years-old, having previously played in the youth academy of West Bromwich Albion. Whilst still an U16 footballer he made his debut with the Aston Villa under-21 team.

Capable of playing right-back or in central defence, Rowe was a member of the Aston Villa youth team which won the Under-18 Premier League South title, FA Youth Cup and the Under-18 Premier League final in the 2024-25 season.

Rowe joined FC Annecy on loan for the 2025-26 season. He scored his first professional goal for Annecy against Clermont Foot in Ligue 2 in a 1-0 win on 17 October 2025.

On 1 September 2026, Rowe joined Belgian Pro League club Royal Charleroi on a season-long loan.

== International career ==
Rowe was a member of England's squad at the 2025 UEFA European Under-19 Championship. He made his only appearance of the tournament starting in their opening game against Norway.

On 14 November 2025, Rowe made his England U20 debut during a 1-1 draw with Japan at the Eco-Power Stadium.

== Career statistics ==
As of match played 11 October 2026

Appearances and goals by club, season and competition
Club	Season	League			National Cup		League Cup		Europe		Other		Total	
Club	Season	Division	Apps	Goals	Apps	Goals	Apps	Goals	Apps	Goals	Apps	Goals	Apps	Goals
Aston Villa	2025–26	Premier League	0	0	0	0	0	0	0	0	0	0	0	0
Aston Villa	2026–27	Premier League	0	0	0	0	0	0	0	0	0	0	0	0
Aston Villa	Total		0	0	0	0	0	0	0	0	0	0	0	0
Annecy (loan)	2025–26	Ligue 2	30	1	2	0	—		—		—		32	1
Royal Charleroi (loan)	2026–27	Belgian Pro League	4	0	0	0	—		—		—		4	0
Career total			34	1	2	0	0	0	0	0	0	0	36	1

== Honours ==
Aston Villa U18

- FA Youth Cup: 2024–25
