= Roberto Olabe (footballer, born 1967) =

Spanish footballer

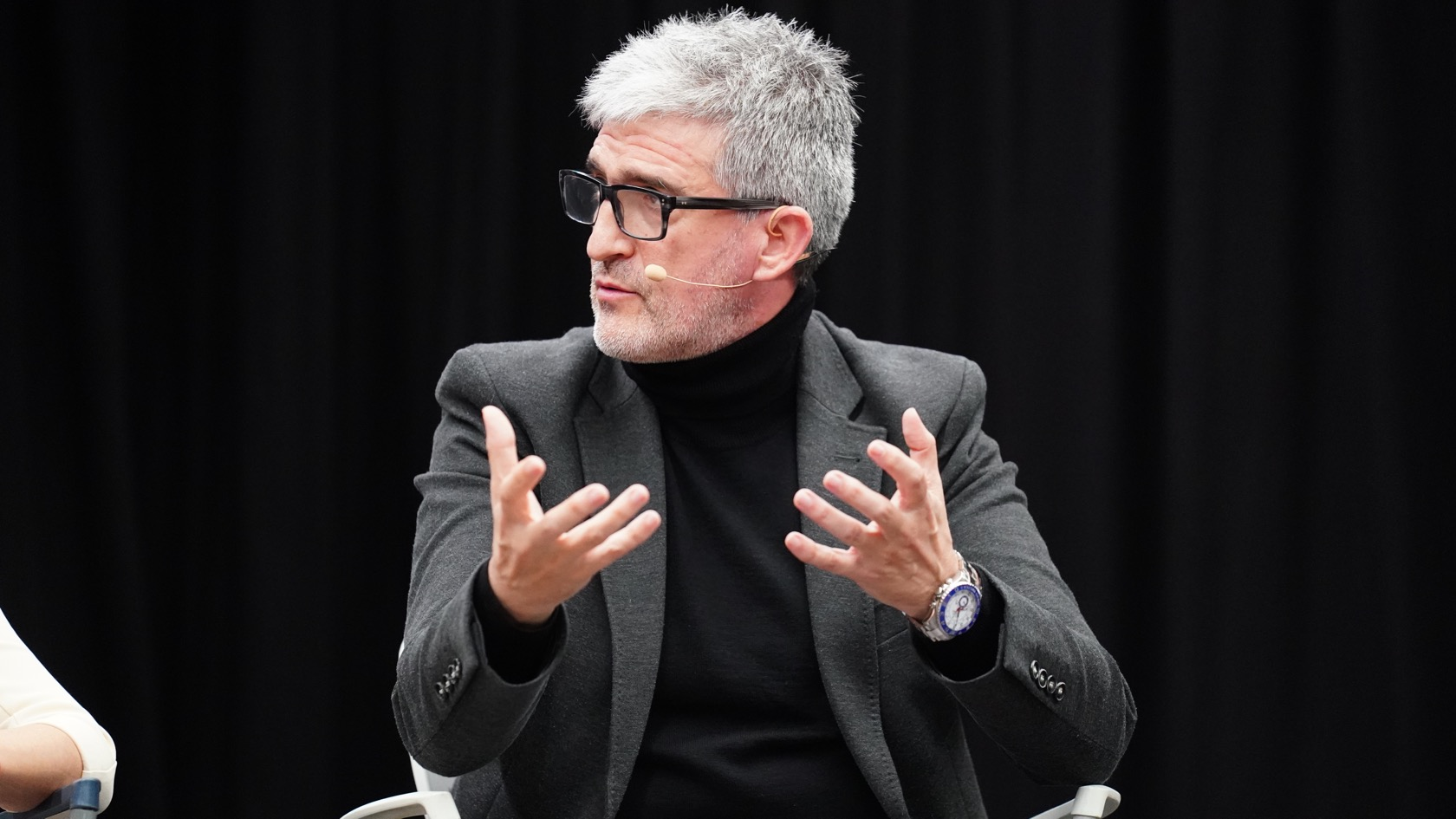
- Olabe in 2024

Personal information
- Full name: Roberto Olabe Aranzábal
- Date of birth: 20 October 1967 (age 59)
- Place of birth: Vitoria, Spain
- Height: 1.77 m (5 ft 9 1/2 in)
- Position: Goalkeeper

Senior career*
Years	Team	Apps	(Gls)
1989–1990	Ibiza	3	(0)
1990–1991	Mirandés	57	(0)
1991–1992	Alavés	0	(0)
1992–1995	Salamanca	107	(0)
1995–1999	Real Sociedad	2	(0)
Total		169	(0)

Managerial career
- 1999–2001: Real Sociedad (youth)
- 2002: Real Sociedad
- 2006: Eibar
- 2011: Almería
- 2011–2012: Real Unión
- * Club domestic league appearances and goals

Roberto Olabe Aranzábal (born 20 October 1967) is a Spanish former football goalkeeper and manager. He is currently president of football operations at Premier League club Aston Villa.

== Playing career ==
Born in Vitoria-Gasteiz, Basque Country, Olabe enjoyed a ten-year senior career. His professional input consisted of 35 Segunda División games with Salamanca, and two in La Liga with Real Sociedad.

Olabe made his debut in the Spanish top flight on 15 October 1995, starting in a 1–2 home loss against Mérida. During his four-year tenure at the Anoeta Stadium, he played second-fiddle to Alberto.

== Coaching career ==
Olabe retired in June 1999, aged 31. He was immediately appointed coach of Real Sociedad's youths.

Late into the 2001–02 season, Olabe replaced the fired John Toshack at the helm of the first team, going on to avoid team relegation after collecting five wins and two draws from nine matches. On 2 July 2002, he and assistant manager Jesús María Zamora were handed a four-month ban as the former did not possess a coaching licence.

After acting as the club's director of football, Olabe was appointed Eibar coach on 27 December 2005. He was dismissed less than three months later, as the second-tier campaign eventually ended in relegation.

In 2010–11, Olabe was one of three managers in charge of Almería – where he had already worked in directorial capacities– who returned to the second division after a four-year stay. In the ensuing summer, he signed with Real Unión in the same capacity.

Olabe became Real Sociedad's director of football in March 2018, replacing Loren in the role. On 23 September 2025, he joined English Premier League club Aston Villa as president of football operations, taking over from his compatriot Monchi.

On 31 October 2026, following Aston Villa's owners V Sports restoring a 46% stake in Primeira Liga club Vitória S.C., Olabe was appointed to Vitória's board of directors, alongside his existing role at Aston Villa.

== Personal life ==
Olabe's son, also named Roberto, is also a footballer. A winger, he also represented Real Sociedad.
