= Ethan Amundsen-Day =

Norwegian footballer (born 2005)

Personal information
- Date of birth: 9 May 2005 (age 21)
- Place of birth: Leeds, England
- Height: 1.89 m (6 ft 2 in)
- Position: Centre-back

Team information
- Current team: HamKam
- Number: 3

Youth career
- –2018: Lervik
- 2019–2021: Fredrikstad
- 2021–2024: Copenhagen
- 2024–2025: Aston Villa

Senior career*
| Years | Team | Apps | (Gls) |
| 2025– | HamKam | 24 | (2) |

International career^{‡}
| 2021 | Norway U16 | 5 | (0) |
| 2022 | Norway U17 | 4 | (0) |
| 2023 | Norway U18 | 3 | (0) |
| 2025– | Norway U20 | 1 | (0) |
| 2025– | Norway U21 | 1 | (0) |
- * Club domestic league appearances and goals as of 20 July 2026 ‡ National team caps and goals as of 17 August 2025

Ethan Amundsen-Day (born 9 May 2005) is a professional footballer who plays as a centre-back for Eliteserien club HamKam. Born in England, he represented Norway at youth international level.

== Early life ==
Amundsen-Day was born on 6 May 2005 in Leeds, England. He is of Norwegian descent.

== Club career ==
=== Youth career ===
Amundsen-Day joined Fredrikstad's youth academy in Norway before moving to Copenhagen youth academy in the Danish Superliga. Amundsen-Day joined Aston Villa youth academy at the age of 19, having come through the youth ranks at Copenhagen.

=== HamKam ===
On 1 August 2025, It was announced that Amundsen-Day had left Aston Villa and he signed a contract with Eliteserien side HamKam until summer of 2029. On 17 August 2025, he made his professional debut for HamKam in the Eliteserien, coming on as a substitute in the 1–0 victory over Bryne FK.

He scored his first goal for HamKam on 26 October 2025 during the 3–1 victory over Kristiansund BK.

== International career ==
He represented the Norway under-16 team five times in 2021.

Amundsen-Day has been a youth international with Norway. He was called up to the Norway U17s in June 2021 and made his debut during a 2–1 win over Luxembourg in Tubize on 9 October 2021.

He represented the Norway U-20 team on one occasion in 2025 and played in the 0–0 draw against Saudi Arabia in Cairo, Egypt on 9 June 2025.

== Career statistics ==
As of match played on 18 July 2026

Appearances and goals by club, season and competition
| Club | Season | League | | | National Cup | | Other | | Total | |
| Club | Season | Division | Apps | Goals | Apps | Goals | Apps | Goals | Apps | Goals |
|---|---|---|---|---|---|---|---|---|---|---|
| HamKam | 2025 | Eliteserien | 13 | 1 | — | | — | | 13 | 1 |
| HamKam | 2026 | Eliteserien | 11 | 1 | 2 | 0 | — | | 13 | 1 |
| Career totals | | | 24 | 2 | 2 | 0 | 0 | 0 | 26 | 2 |
