= FC Annecy =

Association football club in Annecy, France

Annecy
- Full name: Football Club d'Annecy
- Founded: 1927; 99 years ago
- Stadium: Parc des Sports
- Capacity: 15,714
- Owner(s): Phillipe Rey-Gorrez (70%); V Sports (30%)
- President: Sébastien Faraglia
- Head coach: Laurent Guyot
- League: Ligue 2
- 2025–26: Ligue 2, 7th of 18
- Website: www.fc-annecy.fr
Home colours	Away colours	Third colours

Football Club d'Annecy is a French football club based in the town of Annecy, Haute-Savoie. The team plays its home matches at the Parc des Sports, where the club and its predecessor have been based since 1964. It currently competes in the Ligue 2.

Annecy Football Club was founded under its current name in 1993 as the reincarnation of the defunct Football Club d'Annecy. FC Annecy, formed in 1927, spent the majority of their history in regional amateur football. The club turned professional in 1942, but was compelled to return to amateurism a year later. When a national amateur league was formed for the 1948–49 season, Annecy became founder members. After eleven seasons, Annecy became the amateur champions of France at the end of the 1959–60 season, and after a short rise in the early 1970s shrank back into the obscurity that had characterised their early days.

The 1980s saw a sharp rise back up again, as FC Annecy won three promotions in nine years to reach France's second tier for the 1988–89 campaign. The club turned professional again following the first season in the division, and reached a peak in the 1990–91 season as the team performed well in both the Coupe de France and the league. After relegation in the 1992–93 season, the club capitulated in October 1993. Annecy Football Club was therefore established in its stead, taking up a league place five divisions below the third tier position that the former club had left. Though the new side won promotion twice within five years, Annecy then spent nine years in the sixth tier before being relegated again in the 2007–08 season.

Back-to-back promotions in 2015 and 2016, and a third promotion in six seasons in 2020, returned the club to the third tier Championnat National. In 2022, Annecy achieved promotion to Ligue 2.

== History ==
=== 1927–1993: Rise and fall ===
Football Club d'Annecy was founded in May 1927. The first president of the club was Louis Monnet, who held the office until 1933 when he was replaced by Jean Chatenoud. In the 1941–42 Coupe de France, with France divided into three zones during the German occupation of France, the team defeated Saint-Étienne 4–0 and Saint-Chamond 2–1 to reach the quarter-finals of the Zone libre section, where they lost 1–0 to Toulouse.

The club turned professional in 1942 after winning the Lyonnais Division Honneur, but was forced to return to its former status as amateur a year later as professional football clubs were outlawed. As amateurs, Annecy won the league twice more in 1946–47 and 1947–48 before joining the Championnat de France Amateur on its formation for 1948–49. Winning the Coupe de Lyonnais in 1953–54 was capped by finishing top of the Championnat's south-eastern section a year later. The team regained the Coupe de Lyonnais in 1958–59 and ended the 1959–60 campaign as the amateur champions of France. Chatenoud finally stepped down in 1970, after 37 years as president. The Championnat was dissolved after the 1970–71 season, and Annecy were subsequently accepted into the Division 3 Sud-Est.

During their first season in the new league, Annecy were nearly promoted, but lost a play-off match to Martigues. The team competed in the division until 1973–74, when Annecy were relegated back to the Lyonnais Division Honneur. The team revived during the early 1980s, achieving promotion to the fourth level for 1980–81 before winning the championship in 1983–84. Another promotion in 1987–88 saw the club in the second tier for 1988–89, and prompted a change back to professionalism. Annecy's best season that far came in 1990–91, when the team finished ninth in the league and reached the last 16 of the Coupe de France. However, on relegation in 1992–93, Annecy fell as swiftly as they had emerged – the club was wound up on 16 October 1993, and therefore gave up its professional status along with its place in the third level.

=== 1993–: Rebirth and rise ===
Annecy Football Club was formed on the same day as FC Annecy's demise, and took up a league place five tiers below that of the former team in the Rhône-Alpes Promotion Honneur Régional. The new club was promoted in its second season, and repeated this feat two years later. After nine years at the sixth level, the Rhône-Alpes Honneur Ligue, Annecy were relegated again in 2007–08. In 2013 the club regained the historic name FC Annecy, and in 2015 won the Rhône-Alpes Division Honneur, to gain access to the Championat de France Amateur 2. In 2016 the club were again promoted to the Championnat de France Amateur.

Annecy were in top place in Group D of the 2019–20 Championnat National 2 by two points when the season was prematurely ended due to the COVID-19 pandemic, and were therefore promoted to Championnat National.

In March 2021, Annecy were fined by the FFF for coaching irregularities. The club had been coached by Rémi Dru since the dismissal of Michael Poinsignon in December 2020, and in January 2021 had employed Jean-Yves Chay with the title of head coach. The FFF found that Rémi Dru was in fact performing the function of head coach, and fined the club €3,000 per match played under these circumstances.

On 13 May 2022, Annecy beat Sedan 2–0, securing promotion to Ligue 2 as Championnat National runner-up under Laurent Guyot; it was their first time in the second tier in 29 years, and the first since the division became one nationwide group. In the 2022–23 Coupe de France, the team reached the quarter-finals for the first time since 1942 after winning on penalties following a 1–1 draw at Paris FC, and then made the semi-finals by winning the same way after a 2–2 draw at Marseille.

On 3 August 2023, Annecy were originally relegated to Championnat National, but were reprieved by the ruling of a French court due to Sochaux’s administrative relegation to the third tier of French football.

On 2 June 2026, Annecy announced that V Sports, the holding company of Premier League club Aston Villa, had purchased a minority stake in the club: understood to be approximately 30%.

== Current squad ==
As of 7 September 2026

Note: Flags indicate national team as defined under FIFA eligibility rules; some limited exceptions apply. Players may hold more than one non-FIFA nationality.

No.	Pos.	Nation	Player
1	GK	FRA	Florian Escales
4	DF	FRA	Sacha Lima
5	MF	ALG	Ahmed Kashi
6	DF	FRA	François Lajugie
7	FW	FRA	Alan Mondesir
8	MF	FRA	Alexis Casadei
9	FW	FRA	Thibault Rambaud
11	MF	CIV	Souleymane Fofana
12	FW	ENG	Kadan Young (on loan from Aston Villa)
14	MF	CIV	Mohamed Koné
15	MF	POL	Pascal Mozie
16	GK	FRA	Thomas Callens
17	FW	NED	Zépiqueno Redmond (on loan from Aston Villa)
19	MF	FRA	Kilyan Jusseron-Veniere

No.	Pos.	Nation	Player
20	FW	FRA	Adam Yahi
21	DF	FRA	Esteban Marre
22	FW	FRA	Clément Billemaz
23	DF	FRA	Mattéo Veillon
24	MF	FRA	Nolan Ferro
25	MF	FRA	Paul Venot
26	DF	GAB	Jonathan Do Marcolino
27	DF	CAF	Julien Kouadio
28	FW	FRA	Antoine Larose
30	GK	FRA	Matéo Gonzalez
32	DF	GHA	David Oduro
34	DF	FRA	Esteban Riou
41	DF	FRA	Thibault Delphis
80	FW	CIV	Moïse Sahi Dion

=== Out on loan ===
Note: Flags indicate national team as defined under FIFA eligibility rules; some limited exceptions apply. Players may hold more than one non-FIFA nationality.

No. / Pos. / Nation / Player; — / DF / FRA / Cédric Makutungu (at Cannes until 30 June 2027)	No. / Pos. / Nation / Player; — / FW / SUI / Ranjan Neelakandan (at Vaduz until 30 June 2027)

== Notable players ==
- (France) Martin Adeline
- (Burkina Faso) Ismaëlo Ganiou

== Club staff ==
Position	Name
Sporting director	(France) Jean-Philippe Nallet
Head coach	(France) Laurent Guyot
Assistant coaches	(France) Rémi Dru (France) Nicolas Goussé
Goalkeeper coach	(France) Thomas Fedrigo
Fitness coach	(Netherlands) Stan Krug
Assistant Fitness Coach	(France) Nicolas Baud
Mental Coach	(France) Nicolas Leblang
Video analyst	(France) Thomas Chastel
Doctor	(France) Vincent Loiseleur
Physiotherapist / Head of Medical Department	(France) Jean-Pierre Czayka
Osteopathy	(Italy) Mathieu Corsaletti
Scout / Recruitment	(Mali) Charaf Boudiba
Intendant	(Morocco) Billel Soussani
Team Manager	(France) Thierry Castan

== Managers ==
Twenty-three men have managed Annecy in its two incarnations. Only one of these, the Yugoslav Georges Korac, has been a foreigner. The longest serving manager is Jean-Christian Lang, who managed the club for six years from 1981 to 1987.

Name	Nationality	From	To
Lucien Leduc	(France) French	1951	1956
Lucien Leduc	(France) French	1957	1958
Stanislas Golinski	(France) French	1962	1964
André Grillon	(France) French	1964	1968
Léon Glovacki	(France) French	1968	1969
Stanislas Golinski	(France) French	1969	1971
Noël Gallo	(France) French	1971	1972
Jean-Claude Lavaud	(France) French	1972	1973
Claude Rey	(France) French	1973	1977
Laffont	(France) French	1977	1979
Canzio Capaldini	(France) French	1979	1981
Jean-Christian Lang	(France) French	1981	1987
Georges Korac	(Socialist Federal Republic of Yugoslavia) Yugoslavian	1987	1989
Guy Stéphan	(France) French	1989	1992
Christian Coste	(France) French	1992	1994

Name	Nationality	From	To
Victor Mastroiani	(France) French	1994	1999
Jean-Yves Kerjean	(France) French	1999	2000
Alexandre Marinkov	(France) French	2000	2002
Franck Lebel	(France) French	2002	2003
Karim Fatmi	(France) French	2003	2004
Pascal Chavaroche	(France) French	2004	2005
Milé Dukic	(France) French	2005	2008
Alexandre Marinkov	(France) French	2008	2011
Michel Poinsignon	(France) French	2011	2016
Hélder Esteves	(France) French	2016	2019
Michel Poinsignon	(France) French	2019	2020
Rémi Dru	(France) French	2020	2021
Jean-Yves Chay	(France) French	2021	2021
Laurent Guyot	(France) French	2021	

== Honours ==
The club has won a variety of honours, all of them amateur. The most notable honour won by Annecy in either guise is the French amateur championship won by the club in 1959–60.

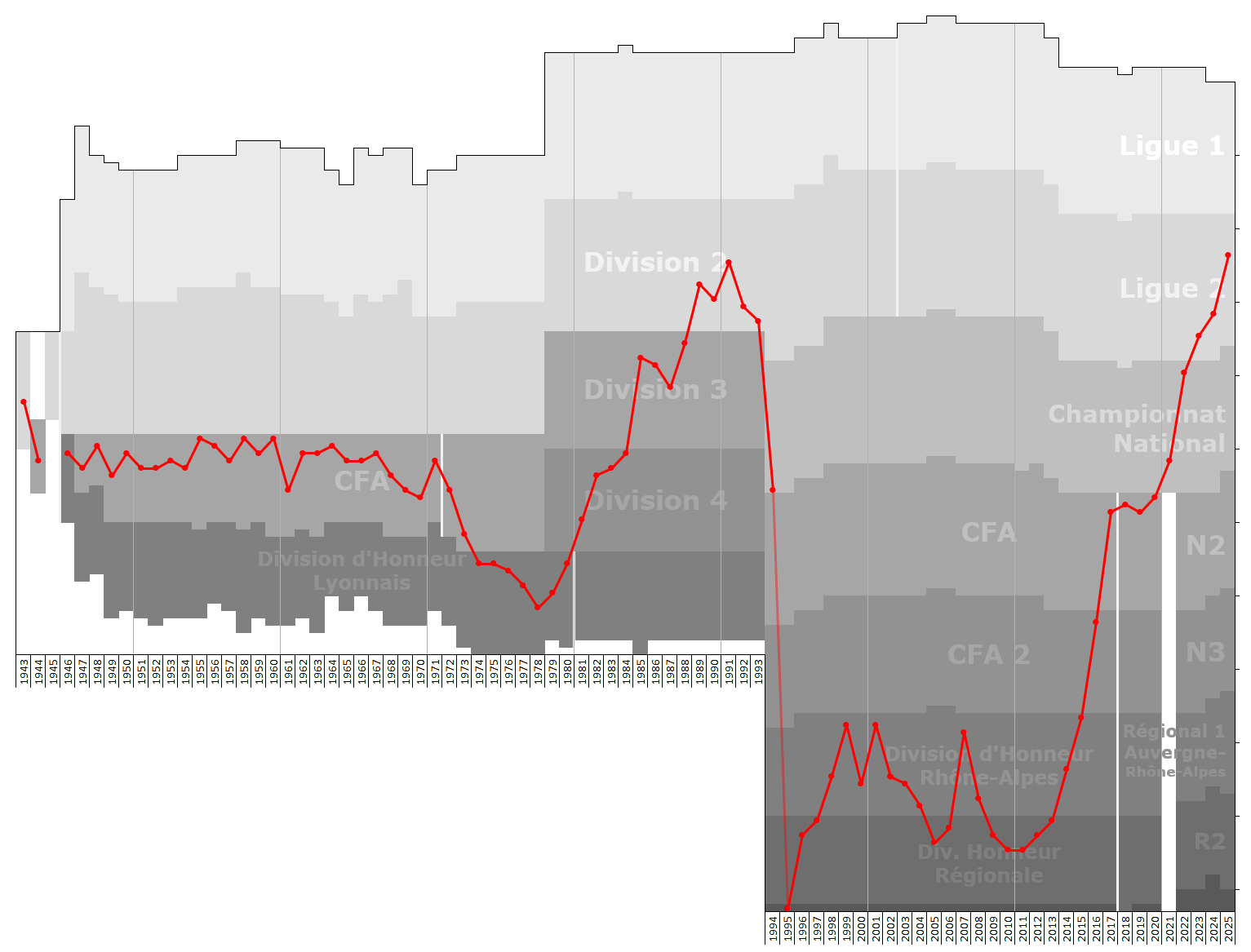
Historical league performance chart of FC Annecy

=== as Football Club d'Annecy ===
Honour		Year(s)
Championnat de France Amateur	champions	1959–60
Championnat de France Amateur (South-East)	champions	1954–55
Division 3	runners-up	1987–88 (South-East)
Division 4	champions	1983–84 (Group F)
Lyonnais Division Honneur^{[A]}	champions	1941–42, 1946–47, 1947–48, 1979–80
Rhône-Alpes Division d'Honneur Régionale^{[A]}	champions	2012–13
Rhône-Alpes Division d'Honneur^{[A]}	champions	2014–15
Coupe de Lyonnais / Coupe de Rhône-Alpes^{[A]}	winners	1953–54, 1958–59, 1979–80

=== as Annecy FC ===
Honour		Year(s)
Rhône-Alpes Honneur Régional Ligue^{[A]}	champions	1996–97
Rhône-Alpes Promotion Honneur Régional^{[A]}	champions	1994–95

== Notes ==
A. The Ligue du Lyonnais, founded in 1920, changed its name in June 1980 to the Ligue Rhône-Alpes de Football and thus renamed its competitions accordingly.
