= Omar Khedr =

Egyptian footballer (born 2006)

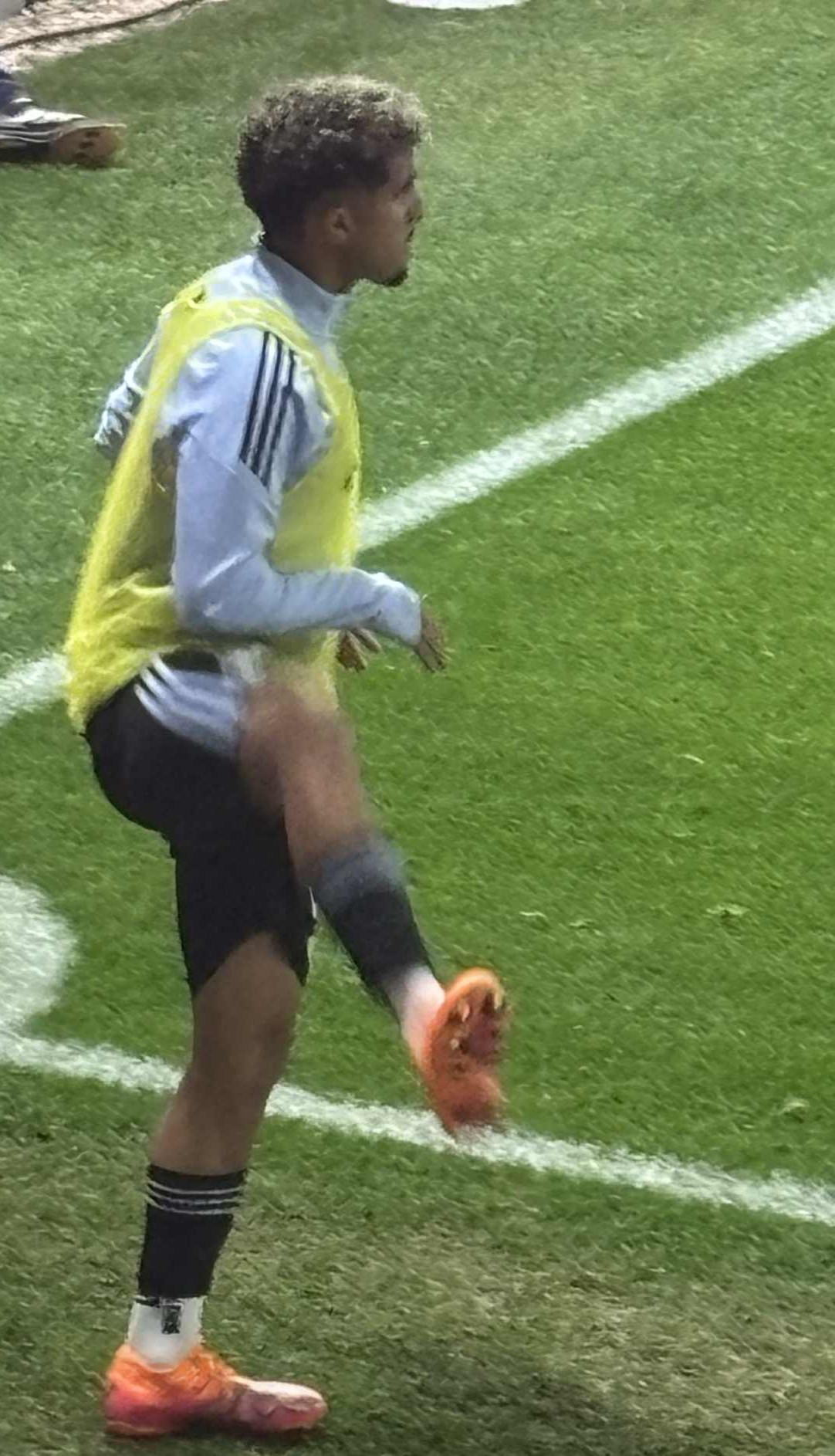
- Omar Khedr warming up for Aston Villa in 2025

Personal information
- Full name: Omar Khedr Ismail Ahmed Hamdin
- Date of birth: 25 May 2006 (age 20)
- Place of birth: Alexandria, Egypt
- Position: Winger

Team information
- Current team: ZED

Youth career
- Embercap Club
- 2015–2021: Zamalek
- 2022–2024: ZED
- 2024–2026: Aston Villa

Senior career*
Years	Team	Apps	(Gls)
2026–	ZED		

International career^{‡}
2021–	Egypt U17	11	(3)
2023–	Egypt U20	6	(1)
2024–	Egypt U23	3	(0)
- * Club domestic league appearances and goals as of 14 August 2023 ‡ National team caps and goals as of 3 October 2025

Omar Khedr Ismail Ahmed Hamdin (Arabic: عمر خضر; born 25 May 2006) is an Egyptian footballer who plays as a winger for ZED FC.

Khedr is a product of the ZED and Zamalek academies. He joined Aston Villa in July 2024. Khedr has represented Egypt regularly at youth international level, most recently at U23 level, debuting aged seventeen.

== Club career ==
=== Early career ===
Born in the Alexandria Governorate, Khedr began his career with the academy of Embercap Club, before going on to trial with Haras El Hodoud at the age of nine. He impressed at the trial, catching the attention of Egyptian Premier League side Zamalek, whom he would go on to join. He would travel to Cairo from Alexandria after school to train with the club, before eventually moving to the city. In January 2022, he completed a transfer to Egyptian Second Division side ZED, with the clubs agreeing on a compensation fee of roughly £100,000.

In January 2023, Khedr's ZED F.C. Under-20 side visited Portuguese side Vitória de Guimarães, with Khedr scoring in a 2–2 friendly game against the youth team of Vitória. Later in the same year, he was named as the best player in a youth tournament, where he played against English side Aston Villa, part of the tripartite partnership between themselves, ZED and Vitória de Guimarães, and he went on to trial with the Birmingham-based side.

Despite reports in Portugal stating that he was set to join Vitória de Guimarães, in June 2023 head of ZED youth sector, Alaa Nabil, stated that he would instead be joining Aston Villa.

=== Aston Villa ===
On 14 August 2023, Aston Villa confirmed that Khedr would join them on 1 July 2024, after turning eighteen. Seif Zaher, CEO of ZED club claimed that Khedr's former club, Zamalek, would receive a fee for the deal. The fee was reported to be €2.76 million, making Khedr the most expensive Egyptian teenage player ever. Khedr officially joined Villa in the summer of 2024 as planned, joining the U21 squad.

== International career ==
Khedr has represented Egypt at multiple youth levels. On 20 January 2024, Khedr made his debut for Egypt U23s, aged 17, in a 1–0 friendly defeat to Iraq.

He was selected for the Egypt U20 squad for the 2025 FIFA U-20 World Cup. On 3 October 2025, he scored a stoppage-time free-kick goal in a 2–1 victory over tournament hosts Chile. Despite the win, Egypt were eliminated from the competition, missing out on the knockout stage due to the fair play tiebreaker.
