= Bodymoor Heath Training Ground =

Football training ground

- Bodymoor Heath
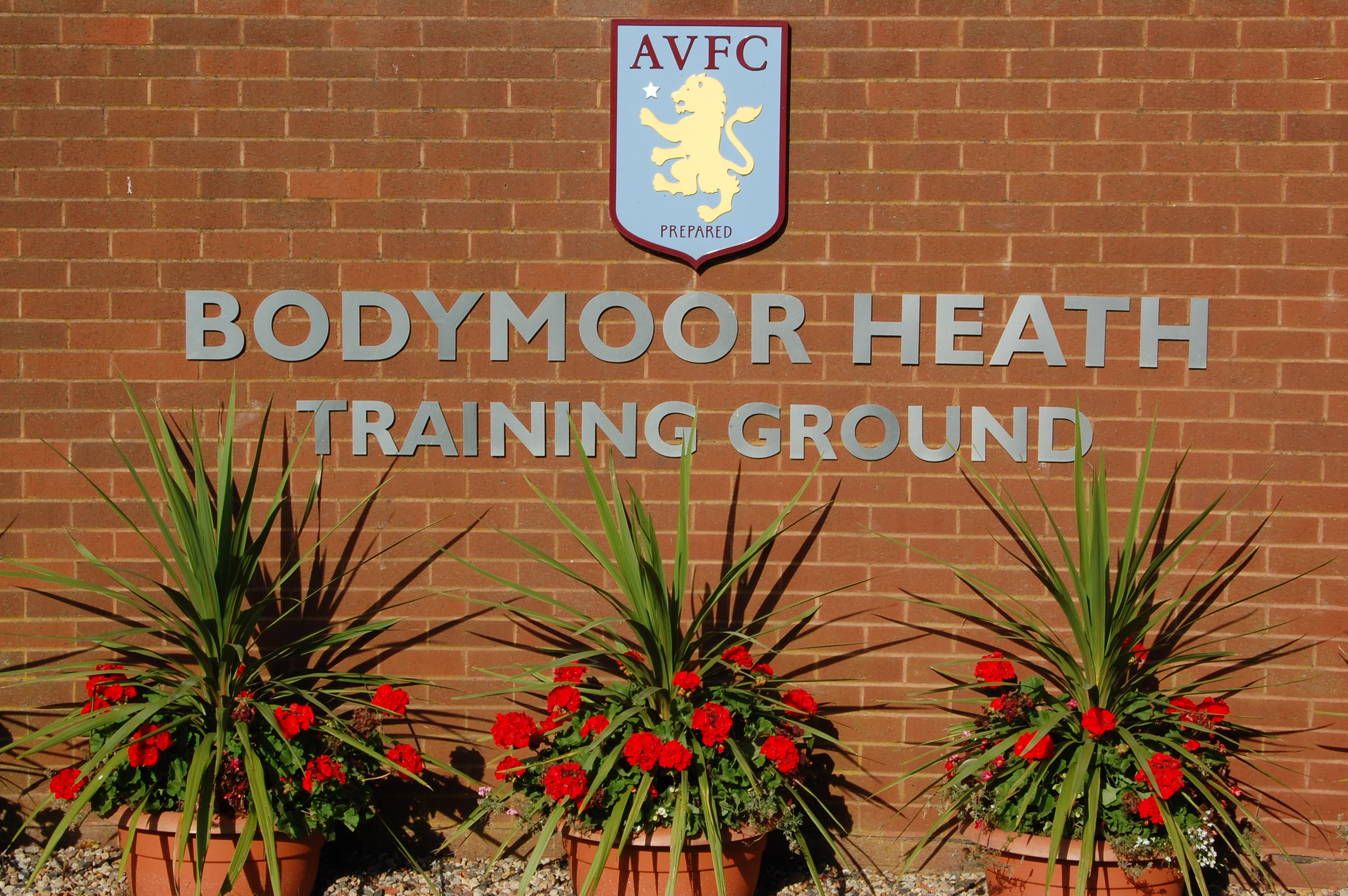
- Bodymoor Heath Entrance
- Interactive map of Bodymoor Heath Training Ground
- Former names: Recon Training Complex
- Location: Bodymoor Heath; Warwickshire
- Coordinates: 52°34′7″N 01°43′14″W
- Owner: Aston Villa F.C.
- Type: Sports training facility
- Surface: Grass pitches (9); Synthetic turf (2)

Construction
- Built: 1970s
- Expanded: 2007 (complete redevelopment) 2020 (academy & performance centre)
- Cost: Total: £27+ million

Tenant
- Aston Villa F.C.

Bodymoor Heath Training Ground is Aston Villa Football Club's training ground, located at Bodymoor Heath in the North Warwickshire district of Warwickshire, England. The site was purchased from a farmer by then Aston Villa Chairman Doug Ellis in the early 1970s. The ground is situated near Fazeley, in the Tame Valley, by the side of the Birmingham and Fazeley Canal, a short distance from Drayton Manor Theme Park and Middleton Hall. It lies close to The Belfry Golf Club, Middleton Lakes RSPB reserve and Kingsbury Water Park, just a few hundred metres from the M42 link to Tamworth and Birmingham.

Many of the past and present Aston Villa players have taken up residence in the area, one of the more rural parts of the Midlands, enabling them speedy travel to training sessions. The training ground houses both the first-team and the youth academy.

The facilities at Bodymoor Heath are also used as the home ground for the academy teams using provided pitches and changing rooms. The Under-23s previously played at Villa Park, although the construction of a 500-seater match complex in 2019 allowed for all of the academy teams to play within the training ground.

== History ==
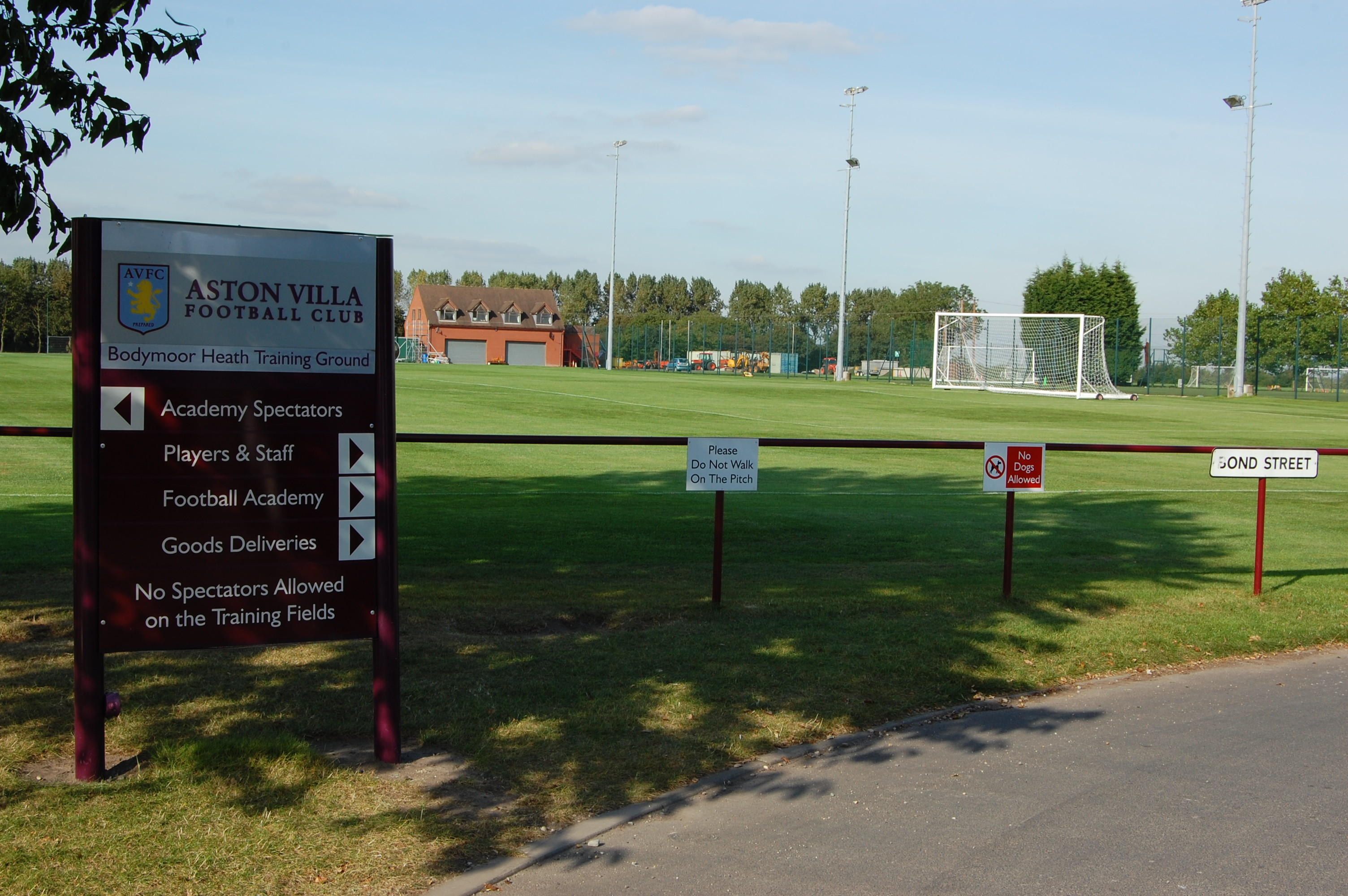
Aston Villa signage at Bodymoor Heath, seen in 2009. Note the tennis courts, behind the goalpost.

The 1960s were an era of conspicuous underachievement for Aston Villa and the club consequently suffered financially. Villa's then training ground, ideally close to Villa Park, was sold for building development at under-value. When Chairman Doug Ellis was installed in December 1968, the team were renting facilities on Cooksey Lane, Kingstanding. The land used for Bodymoor Heath was purchased sometime during the 1970s from a local farmer by Ellis, to replace the previous training facility in Trinity Road, Aston.

By the late 1990's the facilities had started to look dated, prompting then-Villa manager John Gregory to criticise Ellis, stating that he believed he was "stuck in a time warp", citing the Chairman's reluctance to invest further in the training ground as something of considerable concern.

Planning permission had been a significant problem for the club's intention to modernise the training facilities, and it wasn't until November 2005 that Aston Villa announced an £8 million redevelopment of Bodymoor Heath. Before the team's 2005-06 Premier League performance, Ellis had revealed that the club had budgeted the plans for achieving 10th-12th place. However, they finished 16th, and as a result the development came to halt, having already been scaled down from its original plans. Once Randy Lerner purchased the club in September 2006, the club announced that work on the redevelopment of Bodymoor Heath would continue but with revisions and upgrades of the original plans resulting in a total cost of redevelopment of £13 million. The new training ground, designed by HB Architects, was officially unveiled on 6 May 2007.

In March 2019, Aston Villa submitted plans to the local council to expand the gymnastics and sport science areas of the main Bodymoor Heath building, as well as adding a larger match analysis room and increasing the area used for physical training eight-fold. It has been reported that the new 'performance centre' has been inspired by the facilities of the Minnesota Vikings NFL team during a pre-season tour. This followed a complete redevelopment of the Academy training ground, which included construction of a 500-seater "mini-stadium". This allowed the Under-23's, who previously played their home games at Villa Park, to play at the training ground instead. This was part of a complete relocation of the southern half of the training ground caused by land lost due to HS2. These developments were valued at over £20 million overall. The development continued throughout 2020 under the supervision of new CEO Christian Purslow, but were delayed by restrictions related to the COVID-19 pandemic in the United Kingdom.

On 4 May 2021, Bodymoor Heath's new 'High Performance Centre' was officially opened by Prince William, Duke of Cambridge.

== HS2 Impact ==
The construction of High Speed 2 has caused significant issues for Aston Villa, as the line will pass directly through the south-east corner of Bodymoor Heath. This has caused disruption for the first team and academy. In 2018, contractors O'Brien were appointed to oversee the relocation of significant parts of Bodymoor Heath, particularly the Academy, where the line would directly cut into, in order to compensate for the land lost. All the academy pitches and two first team pitches were moved. The overall cost of the Academy project cost £14 million, which was solely funded by the £14.5 million compensation received from the Government.

== Sponsorship ==
In April 2018, Aston Villa announced that Bodymoor Heath was to be renamed the "Recon Training Complex", after a group owned by the club's sole owner at the time, Tony Xia. Although the sponsorship was initially stated to last for 5 years, the majority purchase of Aston Villa by a partnership consisting of Nassef Sawiris and Wes Edens eventually saw the sponsorship deal scrapped after just 7 months, and the old Bodymoor Heath name restored.
