= Wes Edens =

American businessperson (born 1961)

- Born: Wesley Robert Edens; October 30, 1961 (age 65); Helena, Montana, U.S.
- Education: Oregon State University (BS)
- Spouse: Elizabeth Sharp
- Children: 4

Wesley Robert Edens (born October 30, 1961) is an American billionaire businessman and private equity investor. He is the co-founder of Fortress Investment Group and founder of New Fortress Energy. Edens is co-owner of the Milwaukee Bucks franchise of the NBA based in Milwaukee, Wisconsin. While Edens was co-owner, the Bucks won the 2021 NBA championship. He is also the co-owner of association football holding company V Sports alongside Nassef Sawiris, whose assets include ownership of Premier League football club Aston Villa and a 29% stake in Portuguese Primeira Liga team Vitória S.C.

== Biography ==
In his teenage years, Edens was a competitive skier. Edens received a B.S. in finance and business administration at Oregon State University in 1984. Edens and his wife Lynn have four children, and his daughter represented the Milwaukee Bucks in the 2014 NBA Draft lottery. His personal interests include horse jumping, alpine skiing and mountain climbing. Edens built and owns Caldera House, an eight-room boutique hotel and private ski club in Jackson Hole, Wyoming. On May 10 of 2026 that a woman was arrested for trying to extort him with compromising information and demanding half his money and hid the information in a box of sanitary pads according to federal prosecutors

== Career ==
=== Lehman Brothers and BlackRock ===
He began his career in 1987 at Lehman Brothers, where he was a partner and managing director until 1993. He then went to BlackRock's private equity division BlackRock Asset Investors, where he remained until 1997 as a partner and managing director.

=== Fortress Investment Group ===
Edens was one of five principal partners who founded Fortress Investments in 1998. His investment style was described in a 2007 The Wall Street Journal article as one based on "contrarian bets, creative financing and a knack for building business from investments." Fortress became the first publicly traded buyout firm in February 2007, with Edens and his partners taking the company public through an initial public offering.

By the time it went public in 2007 Fortress' assets under management included both private equity and publicly traded alternative investment vehicles — fourteen private equity funds, four hedge funds, and two real estate vehicles. When the Japanese financial holding company, Nomura Holdings acquired 15% of Fortress for $888 million in December 2006 with proceeds going to the five principals, Edens and his partners became paper billionaires. Edens became co-chairman in 2009, and helped the company, which saw its stock price fall to below one dollar after the subprime mortgage crisis, resurge by offering subprime lending. He was chairman of Fortress Transportation and Infrastructure Investors LLC from 2015 to May 2016.

=== New Fortress Energy ===
New Fortress Energy Inc.
- Type: Public company
- Traded as: Nasdaq: NFE (Class A); Russell 2000 component
- Number of employees: 231 (2020)
- Website: newfortressenergy.com

In 2014, Edens founded New Fortress Energy, a global natural gas supply and infrastructure company. New Fortress Energy has stated that their main goals include becoming one of the world's leading producers of carbon-free energy (focusing specifically on low-cost green hydrogen) and existing as a net zero emissions company within ten years.

In 2019, New Fortress constructed a nearly $1 billion floating LNG terminal in Jamaica's Old Harbour Bay. The prime minister of Jamaica stated that the terminal's presence will result in overall cheaper energy costs for the country. New Fortress Energy has been involved in multiple philanthropic projects in Jamaica after its work completion with the LNG terminal. In October 2020, New Fortress Energy invested in H2Pro, a startup that develops low-cost green hydrogen technology. Through New Fortress' Zero, its renewable hydrogen division, the two companies will partner in order develop and commercialize green hydrogen technology. The Zero division also partnered that same month with a gas-fired power plant in Ohio in order to blend hydrogen to produce electricity.

In January 2021, the company announced that it would acquire natural gas company Hygo Energy Transition Ltd, as well as Golar LNG Partners LP, the shipping segment of Golar LNG, for $5 billion to expand its presence in Brazil. New Fortress plans to launch a pilot program in 2021 to test the usage of hydrogen as an energy source of power generation.

New Fortress Energy (NFE) has a contract with the Puerto Rican government until 2026 for the supply of liquefied natural gas to Puerto Rico.

=== Brightline ===
In 2007, Edens and Fortress paid $3.5 billion to acquire the South Florida rail line founded by the 19th-century industrialist Henry Flagler. Inspired by Les Standiford's Last Train to Paradise: Henry Flagler and the Spectacular Rise and Fall of the Railroad that Crossed an Ocean, Brightline's first line was an inter-city 67-mile route (108 km) between Miami and West Palm Beach, Florida. The company recently built and opened a 170-mile track extension (270 km) to the Orlando International Airport. The trains are expected to travel up to 125 mph (200 km/h) and commute from Orlando's airport to Miami in approximately three hours. The ridership target is 6.6 million passengers within its first full year of service.

Beginning in 2024, Fortress plans on constructing a second line on the West Coast, called Brightline West, connecting Las Vegas to Rancho Cucamonga, California with a stop in Apple Valley, California via a 260-mile-long track (420 km). This 135-minute commute aims to carry passengers at speeds of up to 200 miles per hour (320 km/h). Trains on this line will be fully electric and run along the Interstate 15 right of way. Brightline's service is modeled on Eurostar's Paris-to-London commute.

=== Springleaf Financial Services ===
Edens was the catalyst at Fortress behind the purchase of subprime lender Springleaf Financial Services. By 2015 the value of Springleaf Holdings Inc. had ballooned to "$3.5 billion — putting the firm's gain at more than 27 times Fortress's original investment of $124 million in 2010." Edens was heralded as the "new king of subprime lending" by The Wall Street Journal. Fortress acquired 80% of Springleaf in August 2010 for $125 million and used Springleaf and Nationstar to "build out a financial-services business within its private-equity unit, which manages $14.3 billion in assets."

=== Nationstar ===
Edens is chairman of Nationstar Mortgage, formerly known as Centex Home Equity Company, LLC, a subprime home equity mortgage lender, which was acquired by Fortress for $575 million in 2006. In 2005 Centex was "operating in major U.S. markets in 25 states and delivered more than 33,000 homes in the United States." In 2014 Edens' connection to Nationstar Mortgage was cited by opponents of a proposed public-financing deal for the construction of a new arena the Wisconsin Entertainment and Sports Center. They advocated for more public resources to rehabilitate foreclosed homes managed by Nationstar.

=== Cincoro Tequila ===
In 2016, Edens co-founded Cincoro Tequila, along with Michael Jordan, Wyc Grousbeck, Jeanie Buss, and Emilia Fazzalari. "Cincoro" is a portmanteau of the Spanish words for five and gold. Its parent company, Cinco Spirits Group, is named in honor of the five founders who aimed to distill a tequila with a smooth, long finish similar to a fine cognac or whiskey.

Cincoro produces four tequilas: a blanco, a reposado (aged 8 to 10 months), an añejo (aged 24 to 28 months), and an extra añejo (aged up to 44 months). The agave used to produce Cincoro's tequila is hand-selected from two regions in Jalisco. These two regions include the highlands, which is famous for its soils that are high in iron oxide, and the lowlands, which is composed of mostly volcanic rock. After being harvested, the agave is cooked for 35 hours. Cincoro's tequila is aged in American whiskey barrels for 10 to 14 months in addition to the regulatory minimum of 14 months. Its extra añejo blend is a combination of tequilas that are aged between 40 and 44 months.

=== FlyQuest ===
In 2016, Edens launched FlyQuest, League of Legends, which is a professional esports team. Edens purchased the brand from Cloud9 for $2.5 million in December of that year. FlyQuest began competing in the North American League Championship Series on January 20, 2017. Players included former Cloud9 Challengers An "Balls" Van Le, Hai Du Lam, Daerek "LemonNation" Hart, and Johnny "Altec" Ru. Edens intended for his new franchise to assemble multiple teams in order to compete across a variety of esports games and global competitions.

FlyQuest's brand emphasizes environmental issues through its jersey design and ikebana displays at competitions. Each time FlyQuest wins a game, the team plants 100 trees. Its initiatives also include fundraising for marine wildlife conservation.

In September 2022, Edens sold FlyQuest to the Viola family, owner of the Florida Panthers NHL team.

== Sports ownership ==
Edens has invested heavily in the ownership of sports teams and is the co-owner NBA franchise Milwaukee Bucks. Additionally, Edens is co-owner of association football holding company V Sports alongside fellow billionaire Nassef Sawiris. V Sports owns English Premier League team Aston Villa and a 46% stake in Portuguese Primeira Liga team Vitória S.C.

=== Milwaukee Bucks ===
In 2014, Edens and Marc Lasry purchased the Bucks from Herb Kohl for $550 million, promising to keep the team in Wisconsin and build a new arena to replace the BMO Harris Bradley Center. During the first season of Edens and Lasry's co-ownership, the Bucks ended the Golden State Warriors' 24-game winning streak.

On June 18, 2016, groundbreaking and construction began on the promised new arena, the Fiserv Forum. Edens envisioned the arena's design to hold a capacity of 16,500 and to host concerts and basketball games. The arena received its certificate of occupancy on June 5, 2018, and opened on August 26, 2018. Within its first year, Fiserv Forum averaged more fans than the usual sellout capacity due to standing-room tickets. In 2017, Jon Horst, who was later named NBA Executive of the Year in 2019, was appointed as general manager with Edens' recommendation. As of February 2018, the NBA franchise was valued at $1.075 billion. During the 2019 NBA Eastern Conference playoffs, the Bucks defeated the Detroit Pistons, ending their playoff losing streak. Before the 2020 NBA Bubble restart, the team had won 57 percent of its games overall and had the best winning projection for the 2019–2020 season. In 2020, Forbes stated that the Milwaukee Bucks saw the seventh-highest increase in year-over-year value compared to all NBA teams. It was reported to be worth about $1.58 billion, and ranked as first in value for the Eastern Conference in the 2019–2020 season.

In summer 2020, owners Edens, Lasry and Jamie Dinan stated "The only way to bring about change is to shine a light on the racial injustices in front of us. Our players have done that and we will continue to stand by them" in support of the Bucks' decision to cancel their scheduled playoff game against Orlando Magic to bring attention to Jacob Blake's shooting in Kenosha, Wisconsin, a city near Milwaukee.

=== Aston Villa ===
In July 2018, a consortium consisting of Edens and Nassef Sawiris, referring to themselves as NSWE, purchased a 55% controlling stake worth £30m in English Premier League (then EFL Championship) club Aston Villa. The club had previously faced significant cash flow issues. Heavy and irresponsible spending from owner Tony Xia, followed by political difficulties preventing Xia from injecting further funds, had led to a poor financial outlook. Villa eventually faced a potential winding-up order by HMRC, following an unpaid £4m tax bill. Following the NSWE takeover, however, NSWE paid and addressed said financial issues.

A complete overhaul ensued at Aston Villa, with former Liverpool executive Christian Purslow appointed as CEO, followed by a significant turnover of playing staff. The club would subsequently be promoted back to the Premier League, following the sacking of Steve Bruce and appointment of Dean Smith. This included a period of Villa's longest ever winning streak of 10 games. Following promotion, NSWE bought out the remainder of Xia's shares to become sole owners in August 2019. This was done by taking on an unpaid £30m debt owed by Xia to former owner Randy Lerner upon promotion.

NSWE's ownership of Villa has consisted of heavy investment. As of August 2022, over £360m worth of debt-free shares were injected into the club since the initial purchase. Plans to expand Villa Park from 42,682 seats to over 50,000, including the demolition of the North Stand and the creation of a major retail venue, remain at an advanced stage. The project is set to cost over £100m and will be entirely funded by NSWE.

In 2021, the NSWE holding company rebranded to V Sports, with a view of investing into other clubs around the world via a multi-club model.

=== Vitória de Guimarães ===
In February 2023, V Sports entered into an agreement to purchase a 46% stake worth €5m in Portuguese Primeira Liga team Vitória S.C. As part of the agreement, V Sports would invest an additional €2m into sporting infrastructure within the next 2 years and provide a credit line of up to €20m. The agreement was ratified by Vitória's members on March 4, 2023.

Sporting positions
Preceded by Herb Kohl	Milwaukee Bucks principal owner 2014–present Served alongside: Jamie Dinan and Jimmy Haslam	Incumbent
