= Aston Villa F.C. =

Association football club in England

Aston Villa
- Full name: Aston Villa Football Club
- Nicknames: The Villans; The Lions
- Short name: Villa
- Founded: 21 November 1874; 151 years ago
- Ground: Villa Park
- Capacity: 43,205
- Owner(s): V Sports (Nassef Sawiris, Wes Edens & Atairos)
- Chairman: Nassef Sawiris
- Head coach: Unai Emery
- League: Premier League
- 2025–26: Premier League, 4th of 20
- Website: avfc.co.uk
Home colours	Away colours	Third colours

Aston Villa Football Club is a professional football club based in Aston, Birmingham, England. Founded in 1874, it competes in the Premier League, the top tier of English football, and has played at its home ground, Villa Park, since 1897. Aston Villa is one of the oldest and most successful clubs in England, having won the Football League First Division seven times, the FA Cup seven times, the League Cup five times, as well as the European Cup, European Super Cup, and Europa League once.

During the 1880s, Aston Villa was a pioneer of the modern passing game. This short, slick combination passing style was introduced by Scotsman George Ramsay, who Villa appointed as the world's first professional football manager in 1886. The club was influential in the sport's move to professionalism in 1885, and it was a Villa director, William McGregor, who founded the world's first Football League in 1888. Ramsay's trophy haul of six League Championships and six FA Cups established Aston Villa as the most successful club in England, a position it held from the 1890s until the 1970s.

Villa scored 128 goals in 1930–31, which remains the all-time top-flight record, but the club began its first decline in the mid-1930s; the 1940s and 1950s were generally a period of mediocrity followed by a steep decline in the 1960s which culminated in a takeover of the club by Doug Ellis in 1968 and Villa's first and only relegation to the third tier of English football in 1969–70. Villa returned to the top tier from the mid-1970s under manager Ron Saunders, who led the club to a seventh top-flight league title in 1980–81. They became only the fourth English club to win the European Cup, in 1981–82, followed by victory in the 1982 European Super Cup. In 1992, Aston Villa were founding members of the Premier League, one of only three sides to have been a founding member of both the Football League and the Premier League. Throughout the 1990s and early 2000s, Villa regularly qualified for European football, but following a period of decline after the departure of Martin O'Neill the club suffered its only relegation from the Premier League in 2015–16. After three seasons in the EFL Championship and two ownership changes, the club returned to the Premier League in 2019. Under Unai Emery, the club qualified for the UEFA Champions League for the first time since 1982–83 and won the Europa League in 2025–26.

During its history, Villa has spent 113 seasons in the top-flight, the second highest of any club, and has provided 78 England internationals, also the second highest of any club. Aston Villa is ranked fifth in the all-time English top flight table since its creation in 1888, and is the seventh most successful club in English football by competitive honours. Villa have a fierce local rivalry with Birmingham City and the Second City derby between the teams has been played since 1879. There is also a local rivalry with West Bromwich Albion, with matches between the sides known as the West Midlands derby. The club's traditional kit colours are claret shirts with sky blue sleeves, white shorts and sky blue socks, and its traditional club badge features a rampant lion. The club has been fully owned by V Sports since 2019.

== History ==
=== Formation and rise to prominence (1874−1886) ===
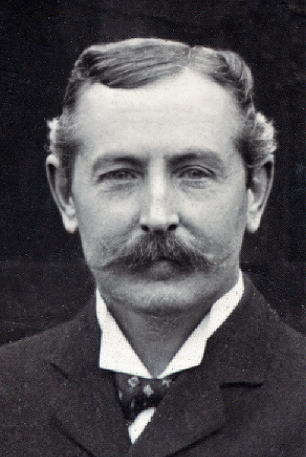
George Ramsay's trophy haul of six League Championships and six FA Cups established Aston Villa as the most successful club in England. He has been described as the world's first paid football manager.

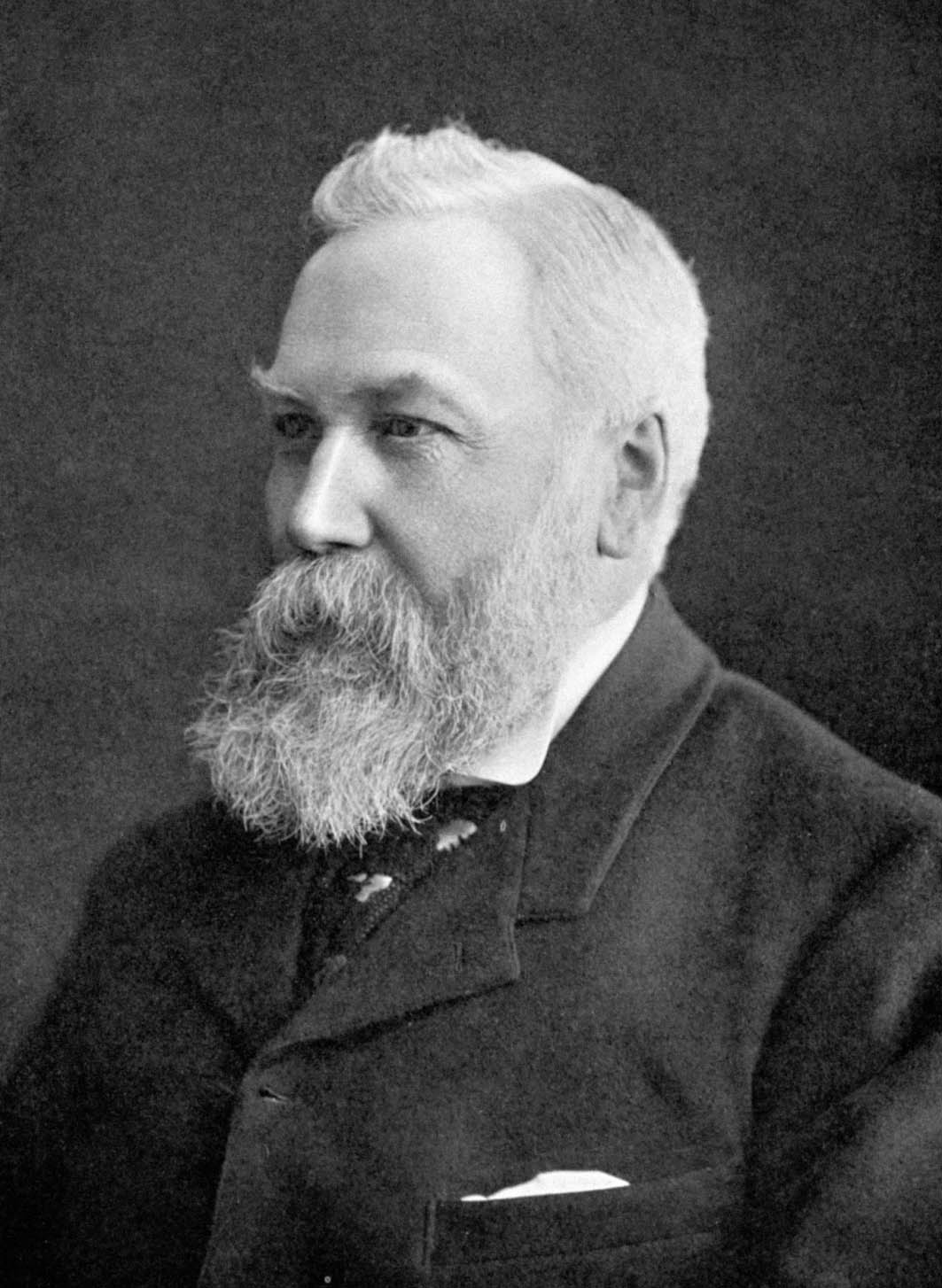
William McGregor (1846–1911), founder of The Football League

Aston Villa are believed to have formed on 21 November 1874, by members of the Aston Villa Wesleyan Chapel in Handsworth: which is now part of Birmingham. The chapel stood at Villa Cross, a road junction whose name derived from a house known as Aston Villa, a suburban Georgian villa that over time had given its name to the surrounding locality. The four founders of Aston Villa Football Club were Jack Hughes, George Matthews, Walter Price and William Scattergood, who were members of the chapel's cricket team looking for a way to stay fit during the winter months. Having watched a fellow member of their Bible class playing in a rugby match, they paused beneath a dim gas lamp near Villa Cross and agreed that rugby was a little too rough, deciding instead to play association football. The meeting beneath the gas lamp is traditionally regarded as the birth of Aston Villa F.C.

Due to the lack of local football teams Aston Villa's first match was against the local Aston Brook St Mary's Rugby team. As a condition of the match, the Villa side had to agree to play the first half under Rugby rules and the second half under Association rules. Villa won their first game 1–0. The infant club's fortunes changed forever when a young Scotsman called George Ramsay stumbled across the Villa players' practice match in Aston Park in 1876. He was asked to make up the numbers, and they were amazed by his skills; they had never seen such a display of close ball control before. When the game was over, the Villa players surrounded him and invited him to join the club and become their captain.

Word spread about how fine a player Ramsay was, spectators began turning up to watch the little man nicknamed "Scotty". He also took charge of training, Ramsay later described the newly formed club's approach to the game as "a dash at the man and a big kick at the ball". On the other hand, Ramsay had been influenced by the Scottish club Queen's Park, who pioneered what became known as "combination football" in his native Glasgow. The intricate passing game he introduced was a revolutionary move for an English club in the late 1870s. Villa began to establish themselves as one of the best teams in the Midlands, winning their first honour, the Birmingham Senior Cup in 1880. The club went on to lift the trophy nine times in the next 12 seasons.

=== Victorian and Edwardian golden age (1886–1914) ===
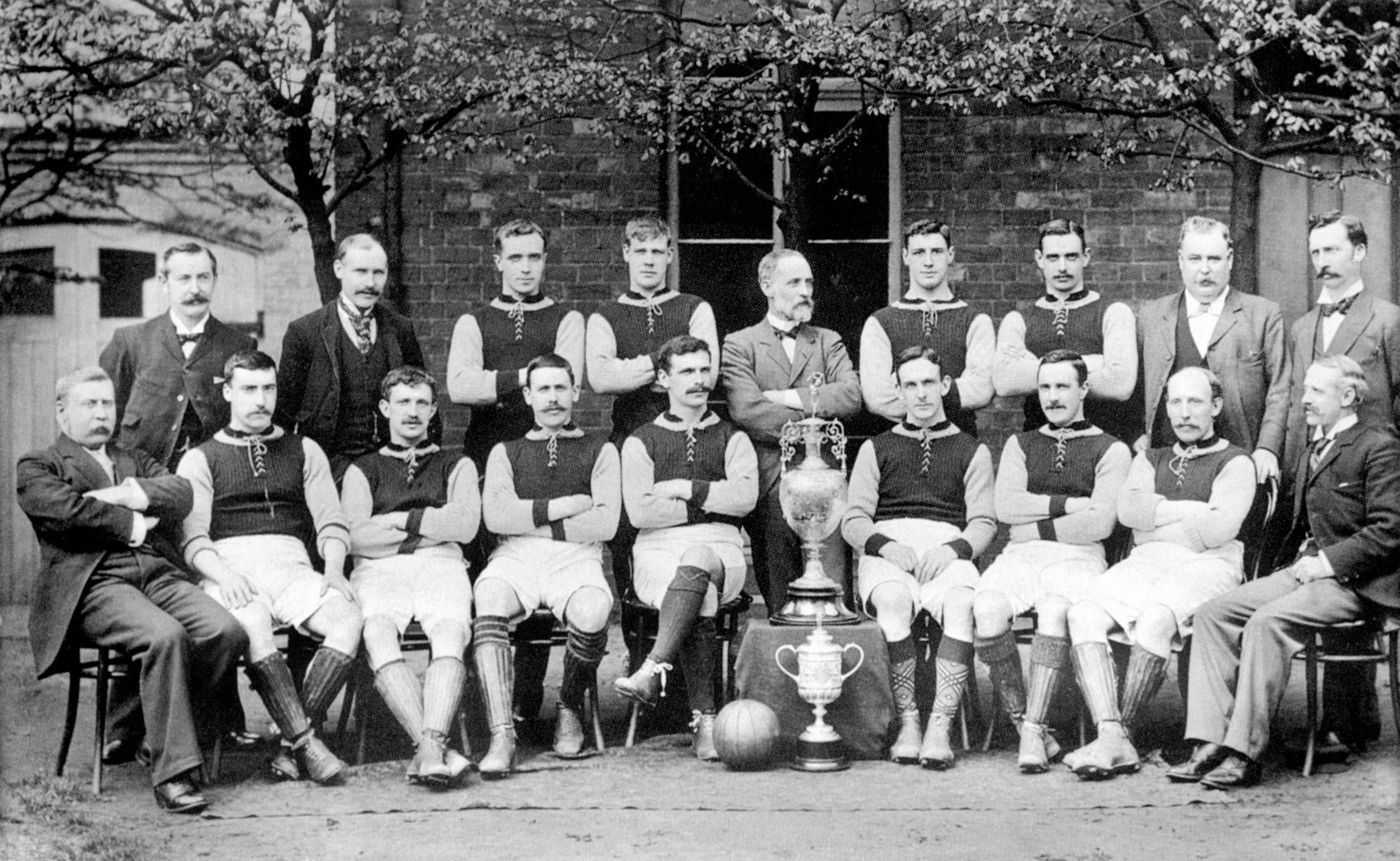
The Aston Villa Double winning team of 1896–97 with the First Division Championship and the FA Cup

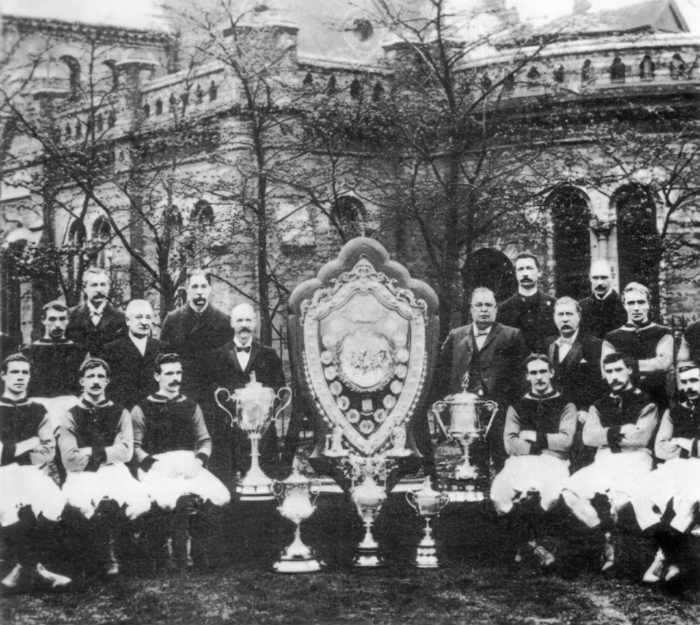
The Aston Villa team of 1899 that won the First Division and Sheriff of London Charity Shield (shared with Queen's Park), as well as a number of county cup honours

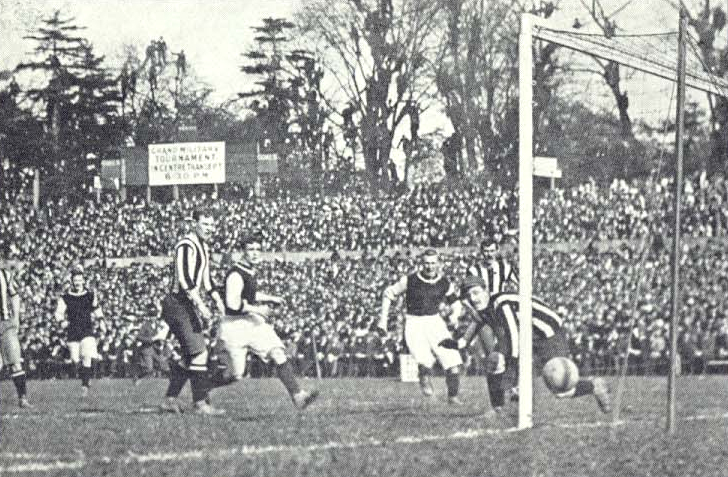
Harry Hampton scores one of his two goals in the 1905 FA Cup final.

Following the professionalisation of football in 1885, the club decided that it needed a full-time paid manager. The following advert was placed in the Birmingham Daily Gazette newspaper in June 1886:

'Wanted: manager for Aston Villa Football Club, who will be required to devote his whole time under direction of the committee. Salary £100 per annum. Applications with reference must be made not later than June 23rd to Chairman of the Committee, Aston Villa Club House, 6 Witton Road, Aston'

Villa received 150 applicants for the role, but with his strong association with the club George Ramsay was the overwhelming choice of the membership. Thus on 26 June 1886, Aston Villa appointed what has been described as the world's first professional football manager. During the following season Aston Villa rose to national prominence, as the first Midlands team to win the FA Cup in 1887. Villa's captain, the powerful Scottish centre-forward Archie Hunter, became one of the game's first household names, being the first player to score in every round of the FA Cup. Aston Villa were one of the dozen teams that competed in the inaugural Football League in 1888 with one of the club's directors, William McGregor being the league's founder. Following the professionalisation of football in 1885, clubs needed regular income to pay their players' wages. Frequently friendlies were cancelled due to opponents' FA Cup or county cup matches or clubs simply failed to honour a fixture in favour of a more lucrative match elsewhere.

McGregor took action after seeing Villa matches cancelled, to the increasing frustration of the club's fans, on five consecutive Saturdays. In March 1888, he wrote to the committee of his own club, Aston Villa, as well as to those of Blackburn Rovers, Bolton Wanderers, Preston North End and West Bromwich Albion, suggesting the creation of a league competition that would provide a number of guaranteed fixtures for its member clubs each season. Following two meetings between representatives of the leading clubs, the world's first Football League season began in September 1888 with 12 member clubs from the Midlands and north of England: Accrington, Aston Villa, Blackburn Rovers, Bolton Wanderers, Burnley, Derby County, Everton, Notts County, Preston North End, Stoke, West Bromwich Albion and Wolverhampton Wanderers.

Despite Villa founding the league, by 1893 they had yet to win it. Villa Committee Member Frederick Rinder was the instigator of a club meeting at Barwick Street in February 1893 that removed the committee running the club at the time. All fourteen committee members resigned and were replaced by a committee of five led by Rinder after he gave a rousing speech criticising the board's tolerance of ill discipline and players' drinking. On the pitch, manager George Ramsay was moulding a team that became renowned for its short, quick combination passing which saw Villa win its first league title in 1893–94; the season after that the club won its second FA Cup in 1894-95. This was followed by back-to-back League titles in 1895–96 and 1896–97.

Aston Villa emerged as the most successful English club of the Victorian era, winning no fewer than five League titles and three FA Cups by the end of Queen Victoria's reign in 1901. Villa's captain during this era was Birmingham-born forward John Devey, who enjoyed a successful partnership with the lightning-fast winger Charlie Athersmith and marshalling Villa's defence was the tough-tackling Scotsman James Cowan, who had an unrivalled sense of timing and anticipation. In 1897, the year Villa won The Double, they moved into their present home, the Aston Lower Grounds. Supporters coined the name "Villa Park"; no official declaration listed the ground as Villa Park.

Success continued into the Edwardian era, with Villa lifting the FA Cup for the fourth time in 1904–05, and a sixth league title in 1909–10. A further FA Cup triumph was achieved on the eve of the First World War in 1913, with the club narrowly missing out on winning a second Double, finishing runners-up in the league. Star players during this era included Howard Spencer, the cultured defender who captained both Villa and England, and the prolific strike force of Joe Bache and Harry Hampton who between them scored 382 goals in claret and blue.

=== Relative decline and first relegation (1920–1939) ===
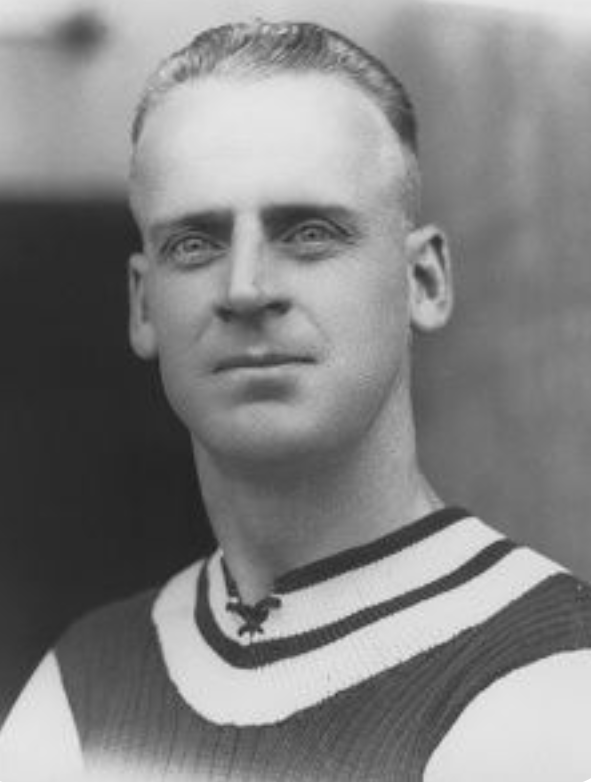
A one-club man, Billy Walker (1897–1964) scored 244 goals in 531 appearances for Villa between 1920 and 1934. He is Aston Villa's all-time top goalscorer.

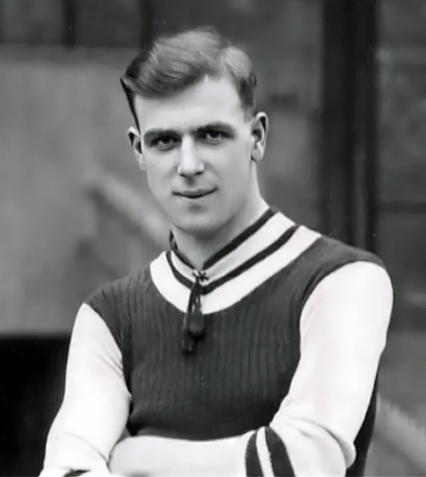
Tom 'Pongo' Waring (1906–1980) scored 50 goals for Villa in the 1930–31 season, a record-breaking campaign in which the team scored 128 top-flight goals.

In January 1920, Billy Walker scored twice on his Villa debut in a 2–1 FA Cup first-round win over QPR; the club won the FA Cup for the sixth time that season and Walker went on to establish himself as Villa's star player of the 1920s, scoring a record 244 goals in 531 appearances, captaining Villa and England. George Ramsay retired in 1926, at the age of 71, and his replacement Billy Smith was unable to continue Ramsay's success. In reality, several other football clubs had caught up with Aston Villa, most notably Arsenal, to which the club finished runners-up in the league in 1930–31 and 1932–33. Despite missing out on the league title, Villa Park crowds were entertained by attacking football; the 128 goals scored in the 1930–31 season remains the all-time top-flight record. A remarkable 49 of the league goals that season were scored by centre-forward Tom 'Pongo' Waring, with another 30 goals from winger Eric Houghton.

The club appointed Jimmy McMullan as manager in 1934, however, the move proved disastrous, resulting in Villa's first ever relegation in 1935–36 after 48 years in the top flight. Villa struggled largely due to a dismal defensive record: they conceded 110 goals in 42 games, 7 of them coming from Arsenal's Ted Drake in an infamous 1–7 defeat at Villa Park. The club made seven signings and spent a staggering sum for the time of £35,500 trying to retain top-flight status at all costs, but were unable to buy their way out of trouble. Aston Villa, at the time one of the most famous and successful clubs in world football, was relegated in 1936 for the first time in its history.

Following relegation to the Second Division, the Villa board brought back the ageing former club chairman Fred Rinder, who said on his return "Villa have been a great club, are still a great club, and always will be a great club". He was vocal in his criticism of the board for its "almost total neglect of the reserve team, instead relying on paying big fees for ready made players". He believed that this change in policy from scouting and developing young homegrown talent led to a decline in the club's culture and style of play, which alongside a tolerance of ill-discipline in the players led to Villa's relegation. Rinder's first act was to travel to Austria to recruit the progressive coach Jimmy Hogan as manager. Within two seasons, Hogan had guided Villa back to the top flight as Second Division champions playing attractive free-flowing football. Hogan outlined his philosophy: "I am a teacher and lover of constructive football with every pass, every kick, every movement an object." He used to tell his players that "football was like a Viennese waltz, a rhapsody. One-two-three, one-two-three, pass-move-pass, pass-move-pass." However, the Second World War ended Hogan's project to restore Aston Villa to the top of the English game.

=== Mediocrity and discontent (1945–1961) ===
Like all English clubs, Villa lost seven seasons to the Second World War, and that conflict brought several careers to a premature end. Bumper crowds flocked to Villa Park following the war, 76,588 people attended the FA Cup quarter-final between Villa and Derby County in March 1946, which is the all-time record attendance at Villa Park. The team was rebuilt under the guidance of former player Alex Massie for the remainder of the 1940s. Star players of this era included the one-club man Harry Parkes, the Welsh centre forward Trevor Ford and inside-forward Johnny Dixon, however the club only achieved mid-table finishes throughout the forties and fifties, never finishing higher than 6th place in the league. The board came in for increasing criticism during this time, with the 1953 AGM described by the Sports Argus as "the longest and liveliest Villa meeting". Shareholders and supporters criticised the club's lack of youth development, recruitment and training methods. When Danny Blanchflower submitted a transfer request in 1954 he said that "the club had grown fat and lazy on its old traditions and the decay was eating at the once solid foundations".

Despite narrowly avoiding relegation the season before, Aston Villa's first trophy for 37 years came in the 1956–57 season when another former Villa player, Eric Houghton led the club to a then record seventh FA Cup Final win, defeating the 'Busby Babes' of Manchester United 2–1 with Northern Irish winger Peter McParland scoring both goals. The team continued to struggle for consistency in the league though, which led to Eric Houghton being sacked in December 1958. His replacement Joe Mercer could not prevent the club being relegated for only the second time in their history in 1958-59. However, under the stewardship of Mercer, Villa returned to the top-flight in 1960 as Second Division Champions with a talented young side which became known as 'Mercer's Minors'. In the following season Aston Villa became the first team to win the Football League Cup, with England centre-forward Gerry Hitchens scoring an impressive 42 goals in 1960-61.

=== Deep malaise and revival (1961–1974) ===
Hitchens' goals brought him to the attention of Italian club Inter Milan, who offered him a large financial incentive to sign. He was sold for £85,000 in summer of 1961, his replacement, Derek Dougan was not a success and Villa slid backwards. Mercer's forced retirement from the club in July 1964, following a stress-induced stroke, signalled a period of deep turmoil and malaise. The most successful club in England had failed to keep pace with changes in the modern game; three of the five-man board of directors were over 70 years old, the club had neglected its scouting network and coaching structure and the club's finances were in a parlous state. This led to the club selling its top striker Tony Hateley to Chelsea for £100,000 in October 1966, without his goals Villa were relegated for the third time in its history, under manager Dick Taylor in 1967. The board even sold the club's training ground outside Villa Park for housing, leaving the team in the position of training on borrowed training pitches of local factory teams.

The following season the fans called for the board to resign as Villa finished 16th in the Second Division. With mounting debts and Villa lying at the bottom of Division Two, the board sacked Tommy Cummings (the manager brought in to replace Taylor), and within weeks the entire board resigned under overwhelming pressure from fans. After much speculation, control of the club was bought by London financier Pat Matthews, who brought in Doug Ellis as chairman in December 1968. Ellis later recalled that "you could write your name in the dust, window frames were rotting, the smell of failure and imminent financial ruin hung in the air"; one of their first acts was to raise £205,835 in a share issue which cleared the club's debts. Doug Ellis's first managerial appointment was the outspoken Scottish manager Tommy Docherty, who after initial success, was sacked after 13 months in charge with the club at the foot of Second Division. His replacement was former club captain and reserve team manager Vic Crowe, who could not prevent Villa being relegated to the Third Division for the first time in its history at the end of the 1969–70 season.

The following season Villa surprised everyone by beating Manchester United in the two-legged semi-final to reach the 1971 League Cup Final, in which the team played well but were defeated by two late Tottenham Hotspur goals. There was a renewed sense of optimism at Villa Park as the club was promoted to the Second Division as champions with average attendances of 30,000 and a record 70 points in 1971–72 season. Off the pitch, the board purchased the new 20-acre Bodymoor Heath Training Ground in December 1971, with a view to improving the club's youth development and coaching facilities.

=== Back among the elite (1974–1992) ===
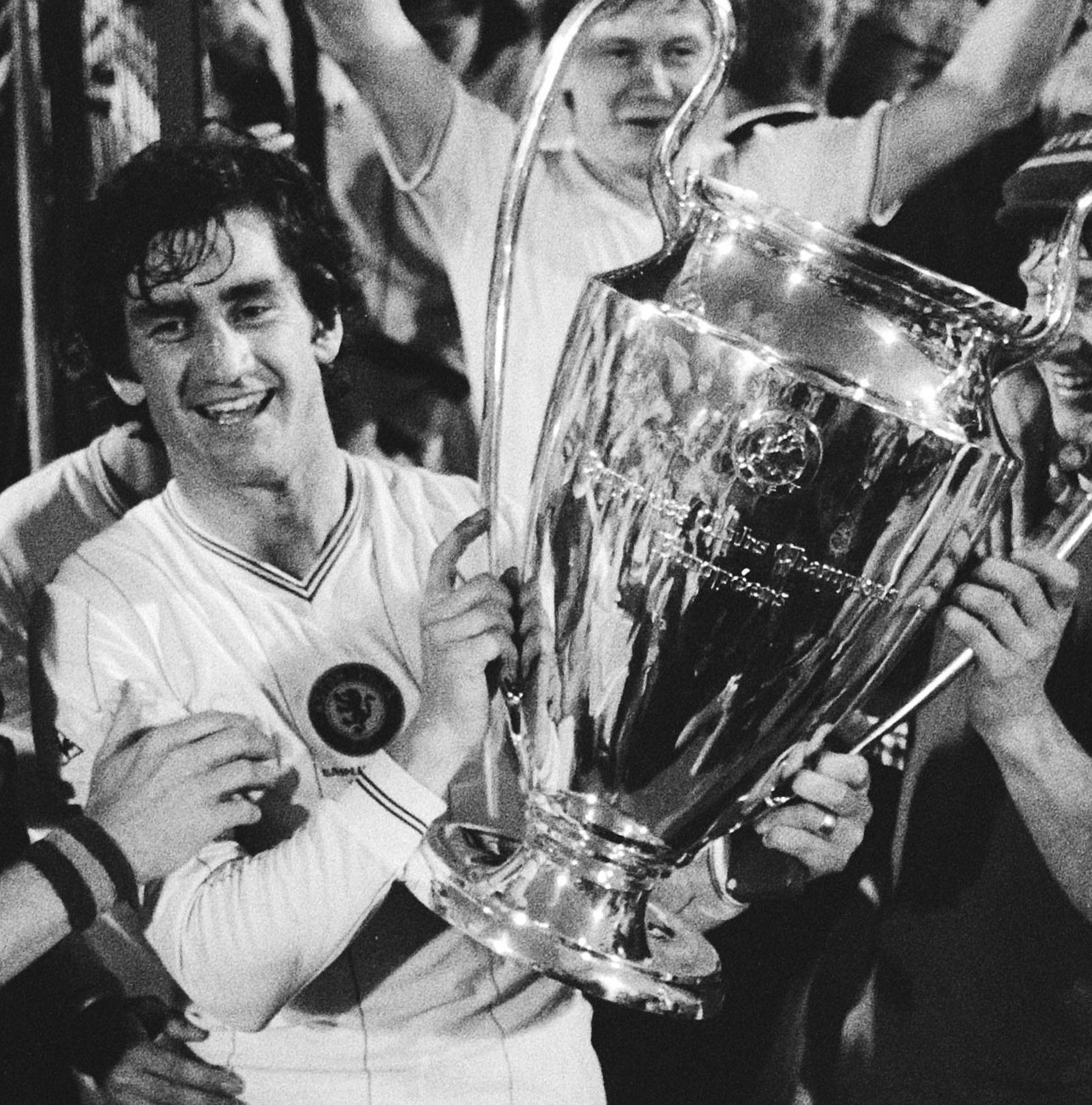
Aston Villa captain Dennis Mortimer lifted the European Cup in 1982.

Following a 14th-place finish in the Second Division, Crowe was replaced in August 1974 by Ron Saunders. He was a fitness fanatic, whose brand of no-nonsense man-management proved effective, with the club winning the League Cup the following season and, by the end of season 1974–75, he had taken Aston Villa back into the First Division and into Europe. One player who had been a mainstay of the Villa team throughout the rollercoaster of relegations and subsequent revival was fan-favourite Charlie Aitkin, who made 659 appearances at left back for the club between 1959 and 1976, making him Villa's all-time record appearance holder.

Aston Villa were back among the elite as Saunders continued to mould a winning team, finishing 4th in the league and winning a further League Cup in 1976–77, with the formidable strike partnership of Brian Little and Andy Gray, who became the first player to win both the PFA Young Player of the Year and PFA Players' Player of the Year in the same season. The 1970s was an era of boardroom unrest at Villa Park. Ron Saunders had a strained relationship with Doug Ellis, resenting Doug's perceived interference in football matters. Over time Ellis became an isolated figure on the board, as the other directors sided with Saunders. He was ousted as chairman in 1975 to make way for Sir William Dugdale. He remained on the board until 1979, when he left the club after a protracted power struggle with majority shareholder Ron Bendall. With Ellis gone, Saunders became all-powerful as manager.

Villa achieved a seventh top-flight league title in 1980–81, with players such as Gordon Cowans, Tony Morley and captain Dennis Mortimer leading the club to its first top-flight title in 71 years. Remarkably, they did so using just 14 players, with seven players being ever-presents. Villa's Birmingham-born forward Gary Shaw was named 1980-1981 PFA Young Player of the Year. To the surprise of commentators and fans, Ron Saunders quit halfway through the 1981–82 season, with Villa in the quarter final of the European Cup. Saunders had expressed his exasperation with the board at the lack of funds available to him to strengthen the team and fell out with the chairman Ron Bendall over the terms of his contract. He was replaced by his softly-spoken assistant manager Tony Barton who guided the club to a 1–0 victory over Bayern Munich in the European Cup final in Rotterdam courtesy of a Peter Withe goal in the 67th minute. Ten minutes into the final, Villa's first choice goalkeeper, Jimmy Rimmer, was injured and young substitute keeper Nigel Spink was called into action, having only made one previous appearance in the first team. Spink performed superbly, keeping a clean sheet, and helping Villa become only the fourth English club to lift the European Cup.

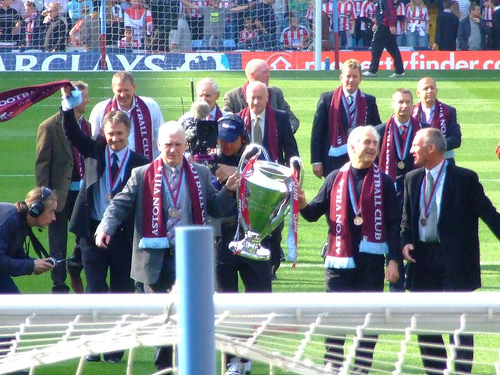
The 1982 European Cup winning squad celebrate the 25th anniversary of their win.

The following season the defence of the European Cup ended in a quarter-final defeat to Juventus, but Villa won the European Super Cup, beating Barcelona 3–1 on aggregate. This marked a pinnacle though and Villa's fortunes declined sharply for most of the 1980s. Doug Ellis returned as chairman and majority shareholder in November 1982. The club was saddled with significant debts and questions had been raised by the police regarding fraudulent financial activity surrounding the building of the North Stand at Villa Park from 1980 to 1982. The cost of the work was £1.3 million. An internal investigation found that £700,000 of the £1.3 million worth of bills were unaccounted for. A later report by accountants Deloitte found that there were "serious breaches of recommended codes of practice and poor site supervision".

Ellis immediately set about trying to reduce the club's overheads. He informed the players that they needed to take pay cuts and told the manager Tony Barton that there was a need to reduce the playing staff. Saunders' team was broken up and not adequately replaced, culminating in the club being relegated in 1987, just five years after Villa had been crowned European champions. However, Villa bounced back quickly, achieving promotion the following year under Graham Taylor and a runners-up position in the top-flight in the 1989–90 season with a fine side that included Paul McGrath, Tony Daley and David Platt. Following this success, Graham Taylor accepted the offer to take over as England manager in 1990.

=== 24 years in the Premier League (1992–2016) ===
Villa were one of the founding members of the Premier League in 1992, one of just three clubs to have been founding members of both the Football League in 1888 and the Premier League, along with Blackburn Rovers and Everton. Villa finished runners-up to Manchester United in the inaugural season under manager Ron Atkinson. His side lifted the League Cup in 1994, beating Manchester United 3–1 in the final, with goals from Dalian Atkinson and Dean Saunders, but the team struggled for form in the league and Atkinson was replaced by former Villa striker Brian Little in November 1994. Little assembled a young side which included players as Gareth Southgate, Steve Staunton, Ian Taylor and Dwight Yorke, leading the club to a fifth League Cup triumph in 1996, beating Leeds United 3–0 at Wembley. Villa finished fourth in the league that season, and fifth the season after.

Following a dip in form, Doug Ellis sacked Little and replaced him with another former Villa player John Gregory in February 1998. One of his first matches in charge was the UEFA Cup quarter-final against Atlético Madrid, which Villa lost on away goals over two-legs. In the summer of 1998, Yorke was transferred to Manchester United for £12.6 million. Gregory managed four top-eight finishes in the league and took the club to an FA Cup final in 2000 with a side that included David James, Dion Dublin, Paul Merson and Gareth Barry, but was unable to assemble a team capable of challenging for Champions League places. At the end of the season, Villa's captain Gareth Southgate handed in a transfer request, claiming that "if I am to achieve in my career, it is time to move on". Gregory's frustration at the lack of investment in the team led to him publicly accusing Ellis of being "stuck a time warp"; their relationship remained strained until Gregory resigned in January 2002. Ellis appointed Graham Taylor for a second spell in February 2002, but a 16th-place finish in the league led to his replacement with David O'Leary in June 2003. After a sixth-place finish in his first season, Villa the finished 10th and 16th, leading to O'Leary leaving in the summer of 2006.

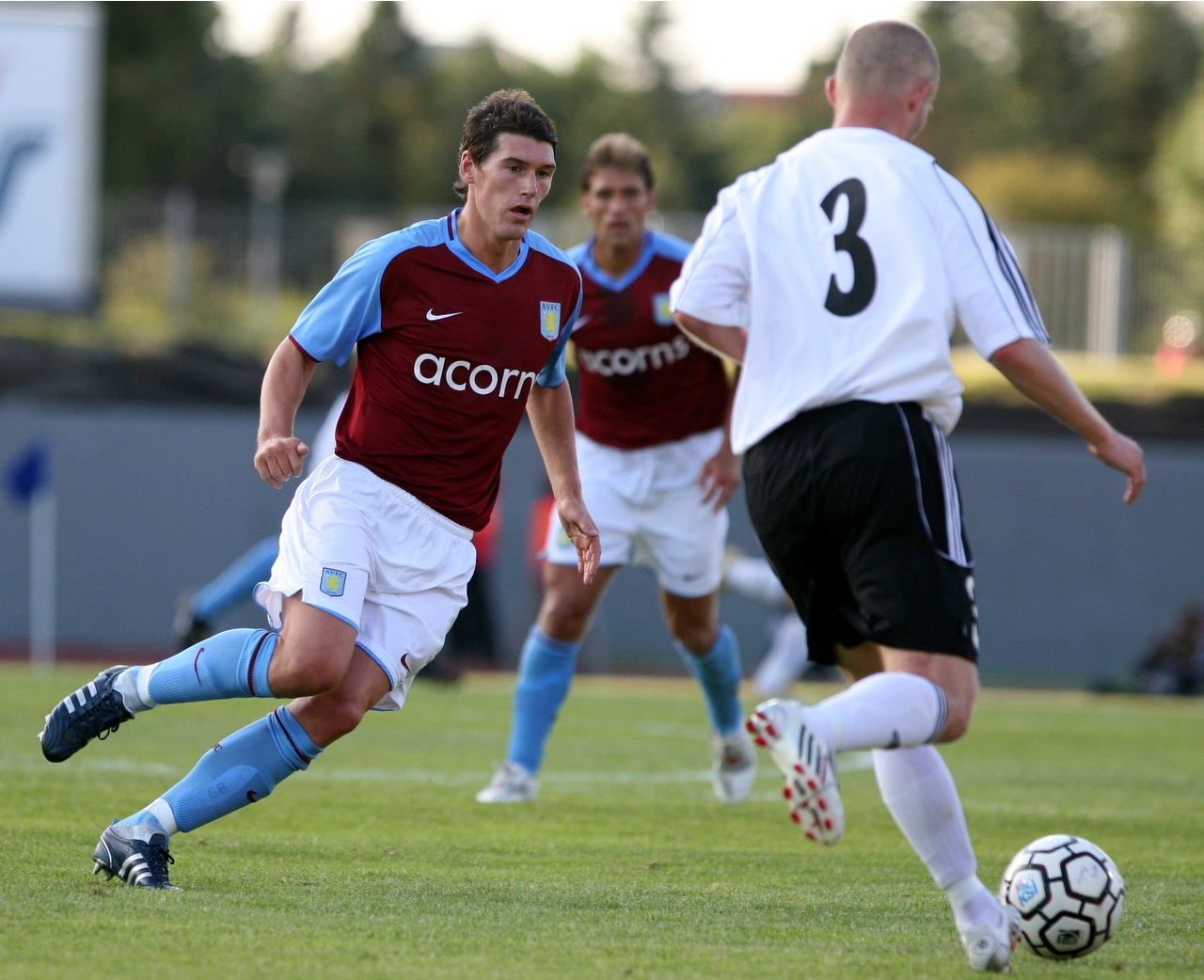
Gareth Barry is Villa's record appearance holder in the Premier League.

After 23 years as chairman and single biggest shareholder (approximately 38%), Ellis sold his stake in Aston Villa due to ill-health at the age of 82. American businessman Randy Lerner, owner of NFL franchise the Cleveland Browns, completed his takeover in September 2006. The arrival of a new owner in Lerner and of manager Martin O'Neill marked the start of a new period of optimism at Villa Park and sweeping changes occurred throughout the club, including a new badge, investment in state-of-the-art facilities at the Bodymoor Heath Training Ground and significant investment in the squad in the summer of 2007. The first Cup final of the Lerner era came in 2010 when Villa were beaten 2–1 in the League Cup Final.

Just five days before the opening day of the 2010–11 season, O'Neill resigned as manager, despite three consecutive 6th-place finishes, due to frustration in the lack of investment in the squad, following the sale of star players Gareth Barry, James Milner and Ashley Young. His replacement Gérard Houllier stepped down due to ill-health in September 2011, to be replaced by Birmingham City manager Alex McLeish, despite fan protests against his appointment. McLeish's contract was terminated at the end of the 2011–12 season after Villa finished in 16th place, and he was replaced by Paul Lambert.

In February 2012, the club announced a financial loss of £53.9 million, and Lerner put the club up for sale three months later. With Lerner still on board, but unwilling to spend following the stock market crash of 2008, the club was uncompetitive for several seasons, culminating in the 2014–15 season, when Lambert was sacked in February 2015 after the team managed just 12 goals in the first 25 league games, the lowest in Premier League history. Tim Sherwood succeeded him, and steered the club away from relegation while also leading them to the 2015 FA Cup Final. However, the club sold two of its star players Christian Benteke and captain Fabian Delph in the summer transfer window and did not adequately replace them. Villa struggled in the 2015–16 season, and Sherwood was sacked following six consecutive defeats. He was replaced by Rémi Garde, who left after just five months, with Villa lying bottom of the table; his reign included a club-record 19 game winless run. The club was relegated at the end of the season, ending their 29-year stay in the top flight.

=== Championship to Champions League (2016–present) ===
In June 2016, Chinese businessman Tony Xia bought the club for £76 million. Former Chelsea boss Roberto Di Matteo was appointed as the club's new manager, but was dismissed after just 12 games following a poor start to the season. He was replaced by former Birmingham manager Steve Bruce. Bruce led the team to finish fourth in the 2017–18 season, but lost in the 2018 EFL Championship play-off final to Fulham. Following failure to secure promotion to the Premier League, the club faced significant financial difficulties. Following rumours that administration was imminent, Xia looked to sell the club. On 20 July 2018 it was announced that the NSWE Group, a consortium consisting of Egyptian billionaire Nassef Sawiris and the American billionaire Wes Edens, were to invest in the football club. They purchased a controlling 55% stake in the club, and Sawiris took over the role of club chairman, appointing Christian Purslow as CEO.

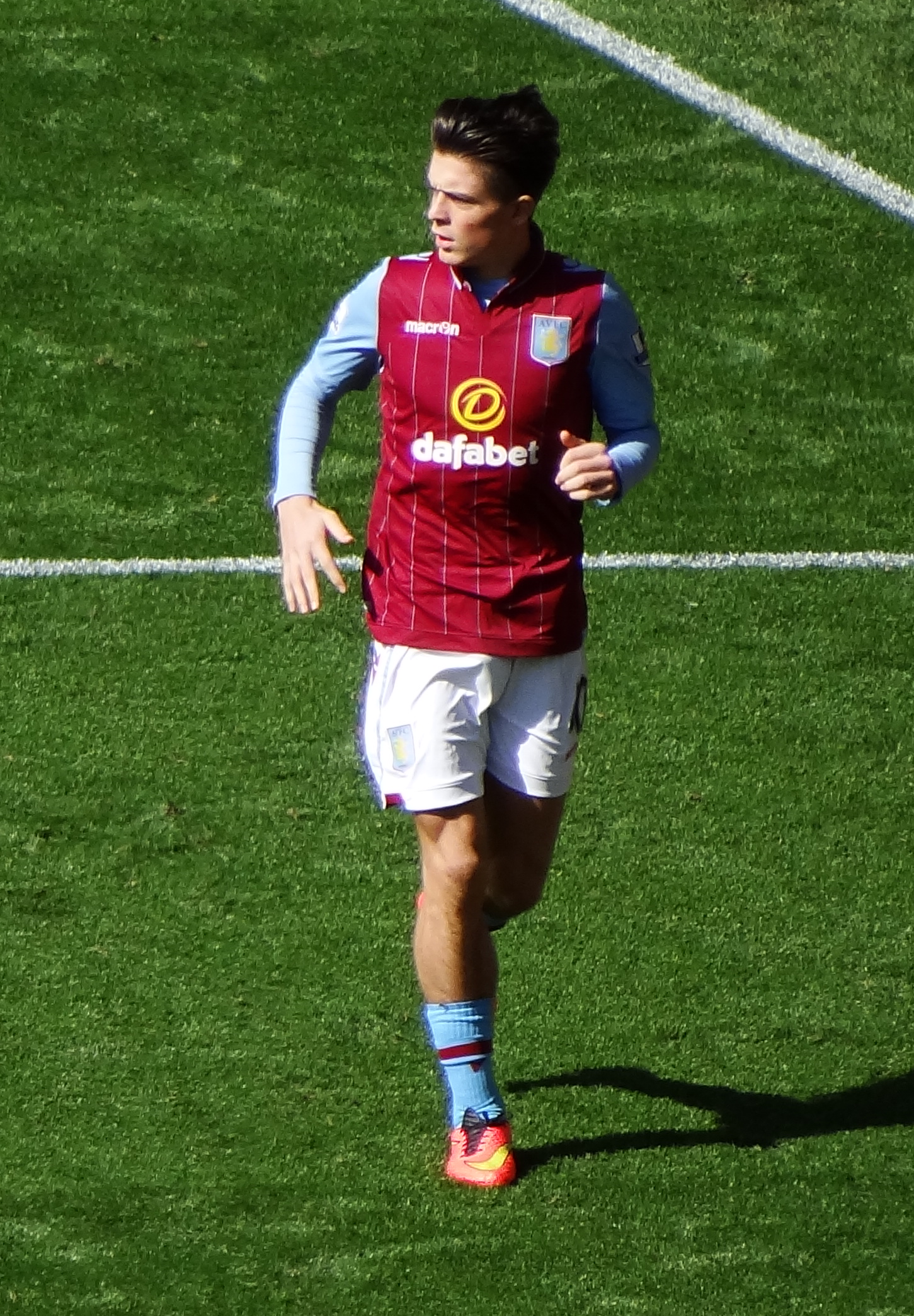
In 2021, Aston Villa sold Jack Grealish to Manchester City for a British record £100 million.

In October 2018, Bruce was dismissed after winning only once in a nine match stretch. He was replaced by Brentford manager and boyhood Villa fan Dean Smith, who led the team to fifth place, and reaching the playoffs again—helped on by a club-record 10 league game winning streak. They reached the 2019 EFL Championship play-off final and defeated Derby County 2–1 to gain promotion back to the Premier League after a three-year absence.

On the eve of Villa's Premier League return, Recon Group's minority share ownership was bought out by NSWE, meaning Xia no longer had any stake in the club. Villa's first season back in the Premier League saw a significant overhaul of the squad, with 12 players signed during the summer transfer window. The team battled relegation for most of the season, but stayed up on the final day with a 17th-place finish. In Villa's second season back in the Premier League, Smith oversaw an 11th-place finish, but was unable to persuade star player and captain Jack Grealish to remain at the club after Manchester City's British-record £100 million bid triggered his release clause. Following a poor start to the 2021–22 season, which saw seven losses in the club's opening 11 games, Dean Smith was dismissed.

Aston Villa appointed former Liverpool and England captain Steven Gerrard as head coach on 11 November 2021. After a poor start to the 2022–23 season, in which Villa won just twice and scored only seven goals in their opening 11 games, Gerrard was sacked in October 2022, and replaced by four-time Europa League-winning Spanish manager Unai Emery. He led Villa to seventh place and qualification for the Europa Conference League in his first season. In the 2023–24 season, Emery led the club to the Conference League semi-finals, where they were knocked out by Olympiacos, and a fourth-place finish in the league, securing participation in the UEFA Champions League for the first time since 1982–83. In the following Champions League campaign, the team reached the quarter-finals before a 5–4 aggregate loss to eventual winners Paris Saint-Germain. In the 2025–26 season, Aston Villa reached the 2026 UEFA Europa League final, subsequently beating SC Freiburg 3–0 to end a 30-year trophy drought.

== Colours and badge ==
Villa's proposed kit of 1886

The club colours are a claret shirt with sky blue sleeves, white shorts with claret and blue trim, and sky blue socks with claret and white trim. They were the original wearers of the claret and blue. Villa's colours at the outset were royal blue caps and stockings, royal blue and scarlet "striped" (in the context of the time, hooped) jerseys, and white knickerbockers, one of the club rules including a provision that "no member can take part in a match without wearing the above uniform". For a few years after that (1877–79) the team wore several different kits from all white, blue and black, red and blue to plain green. By 1880, black jerseys with a Scottish Lion Rampant embroidered on the chest were introduced by Villa's Scottish leaders William McGregor and George Ramsay. This remained the first choice strip for six years. On Monday, 8 November 1886, an entry in the club's official minute book states:

(i) Proposed and seconded that the colours be chocolate and sky blue shirts and that we order two dozen. (ii) Proposed and seconded that Mr McGregor be requested to supply them at the lowest quotation.

The chocolate colour later became claret. Nobody is quite sure why claret and blue became the club's adopted colours. Several other football teams adopted their colours, or also play in claret and blue, including West Ham United, Burnley, Scunthorpe United and Turkish club Trabzonspor. Crystal Palace also played in Villa's colours until the 1970s. A new badge was revealed in May 2007, for the 2007–08 season and beyond. The new badge includes a star to represent the European Cup win in 1982, and has a light blue background behind Villa's 'lion rampant'. The traditional motto "Prepared" remains in the badge, and the name Aston Villa has been shortened to AVFC, FC having been omitted from the previous badge. The lion is now unified as opposed to fragmented lions of the past. Randy Lerner petitioned fans to help with the design of the new badge.

Kit-exclusive badge for the 2023–24 season.

On 6 April 2016, the club confirmed that it would be using a new badge from the 2016–17 season after consulting fan groups for suggestions. The lion in the new badge has claws added to it, and the word "Prepared" was removed to increase the size of the lion and club initials in the badge. In November 2022, following a fan-led vote, the club announced it would adopt a new badge for the following season. The new badge's usage was later clarified to be exclusive to on-field kits and training wear by club president of business operations, Chris Heck, with the existing badge continuing to be utilized as the primary in all other channels. In May 2024, the club reverted to a shield-shaped badge.

=== Kit manufacturers and sponsors ===
Tables of kit suppliers and shirt sponsors appear below:

Years	Kit manufacturer	Kit sponsor	Sleeve sponsor	Back sponsor
1974–1981	Umbro	None	None	None
1981–1982	Le Coq Sportif	None	None	None
1982–1983	Le Coq Sportif	Davenports Brewery	None	None
1983–1984	Le Coq Sportif	None	None	None
1984–1985	Le Coq Sportif	Mita Copiers	None	None
1985–1987	Henson	Mita Copiers	None	None
1987–1990	Hummel	Mita Copiers	None	None
1990–1993	Umbro	Mita Copiers	None	None
1993–1995	Asics	Müller	None	None
1995–1998	Reebok	AST Computers	None	None
1998–2000	Reebok	LDV Vans	None	None
2000–2002	Diadora	NTL	None	None
2002–2004	Diadora	Rover	None	None
2004–2006	Hummel	DWS Investments	None	None
2006–2007	Hummel	32Red	None	None
2007–2008	Nike	32Red	None	None
2008–2010	Nike	Acorns Children's Hospice	None	None
2010–2011	Nike	FxPro	None	None
2011–2012	Nike	Genting Casinos	None	None
2012–2013	Macron	Genting Casinos	None	None
2013–2015	Macron	Dafabet	None	None
2015–2016	Macron	Intuit Quickbooks	None	None
2016–2017	Under Armour	Intuit Quickbooks	None	None
2017–2018	Under Armour	Unibet	None	Recon Group
2018–2019	Luke 1977	32Red	None	None
2019–2020	Kappa	W88	BR88	None
2020–2021	Kappa	Cazoo	LT.COM	None
2021–2022	Kappa	Cazoo	OB Sports	None
2022–2023	Castore	Cazoo	Kaiyun Sports	None
2023–2024	Castore	BK8	Trade Nation	None
2024–2025	Adidas	Betano	Trade Nation	Black Sabbath (League Cup)
2025–2026	Adidas	Betano	Trade Nation	None
2026–	Adidas	Visit Rwanda	Betano	None

Aston Villa's kit was produced by local manufacturers until 1974, when Umbro became the first kit supplier to have its logo on a Villa shirt. Aston Villa's first shirt sponsor was Davenports Breweries in the 1982–83 season. Aston Villa forwent commercial kit sponsorship for the 2008–09 and 2009–10 seasons; instead advertising the charity Acorns Children's Hospice, the first deal of its kind in Premier League history. The partnership continued until 2010 when a commercial sponsor replaced Acorns, with the hospice becoming the club's Official Charity Partner. A shirt sleeve sponsor was used for the first time in the 2019–20 season with BR88 being displayed. In August 2025, Aston Villa announced a partnership with Red Bull, making the company the club's Official Energy Drink Partner.

== Stadium ==
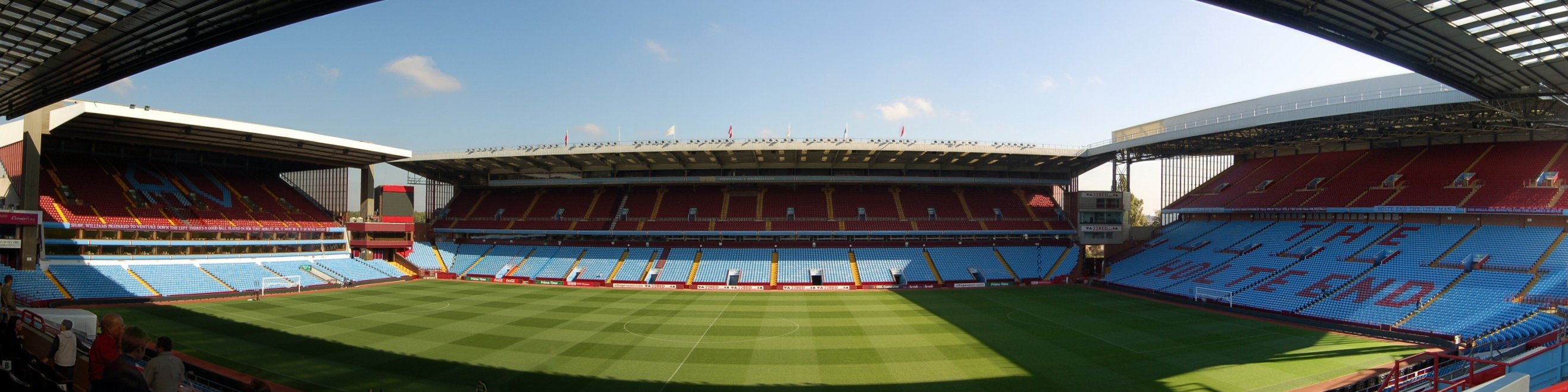
A panorama of Villa Park from the Trinity Road Stand, showing from left to right the North Stand, the Doug Ellis Stand and the Holte End

Aston Villa's current home venue is Villa Park; the team previously played at Aston Park (1874–1876) and Wellington Road (1876–1897). Villa Park is the largest football stadium in the English Midlands, and the eighth largest stadium in England. It has hosted 16 England internationals at senior level, the first in 1899, and the most recent in 2025. Thus, it was the first English ground to stage international football in three different centuries. Villa Park is the most used stadium in FA Cup semi-final history, having hosted 55 semi-finals. In 2022, the club announced plans to rebuild the North Stand and part of the Trinity Road stand, which will take the maximum capacity over 50,000.

The current training ground is located at Bodymoor Heath near Kingsbury in north Warwickshire, the site for which was purchased by former chairman Doug Ellis in the early 1970s from a local farmer. Although Bodymoor Heath was state-of-the-art in the 1970s, by the late 1990s the facilities had started to look dated. In November 2005, Ellis and Aston Villa plc announced a state of the art £13 million redevelopment of Bodymoor in two phases. The new training ground was officially unveiled on 6 May 2007, by then manager Martin O'Neill, then-team captain Gareth Barry and 1982 European Cup winning team captain Dennis Mortimer, with the Aston Villa squad moving in for the 2007–08 season.

It was announced on 6 August 2014, that Villa Park would appear in the FIFA video game from FIFA 15, with all other Premier League stadiums also fully licensed from this game onwards. Aston Villa operates under the guidance of the Safety Advisory Group (SAG), which is responsible for issuing safety certificates for matches held at Villa Park, taking into account both physical and security considerations. In 2023, ahead of a UEFA Europa Conference League match against Legia Warsaw, away supporters were barred from attending following clashes outside the stadium. Similarly, in November 2025, fans of Maccabi Tel Aviv were prohibited from attending a scheduled UEFA Europa League match at Villa Park, mainly due to the threat of violence by Maccabi fans.

== Ownership ==
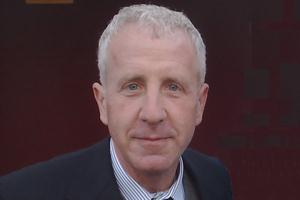
Randy Lerner, the club owner of Aston Villa (2006–2016)

The first shares in the club were issued towards the end of the 19th century as a result of legislation that was intended to codify the growing numbers of professional teams and players in the Association Football leagues. FA teams were required to distribute shares to investors as a way of facilitating trading among the teams without implicating the FA itself. This trading continued for much of the 20th century until Ellis started buying up many of the shares in the 1960s. He was chairman and substantial shareholder of "Aston Villa F.C." from 1968 to 1975 and the majority shareholder from 1982 to 2006. The club were floated on the London Stock Exchange (LSE) in 1996, and the share price fluctuated in the ten years after the flotation. In 2006, it was announced that several consortia and individuals were considering bids for Aston Villa.

On 14 August 2006, it was confirmed that Randy Lerner, then owner of the National Football League's Cleveland Browns, had reached an agreement of £62.6 million with Aston Villa for a takeover of the club. Lerner took full control on 18 September with Ellis and his board replaced with a new board by Lerner on 19 September 2006. Lerner appointed himself chairman of the club with Charles Krulak as a non-executive director and Ellis awarded the honorary position of Chairman Emeritus. Lerner put the club up for sale in May 2014, valuing it at an estimated £200 million.

On 18 May 2016, Randy Lerner agreed the sale of Aston Villa to Recon Group, owned by Chinese businessman Tony Xia. The sale was completed on 14 June 2016 for a reported £76 million, after being approved by the Football League. After a period of high expenditure and failing to secure promotion to the Premier League in the 2017–18 Championship playoff final, financial difficulties at the club began to mount. Amid rumours that Villa risked entering administration, Xia entered talks to sell the club in June 2018.

On 20 July 2018, it was announced that V Sports (at the time known as NSWE Group), a consortium consisting of Egyptian billionaire Nassef Sawiris and the American billionaire Wes Edens, were to invest in the football club. They purchased a controlling 55% stake in the club, and Sawiris took over the role of club chairman. Prior to V Sports purchasing the club in 2018, it was reported that New York Yankees minority owner, Peter Freund was interested in purchasing the club for £75 million. On 9 August 2019, following Villa's promotion to the Premier League, Companies House revealed that the remainder of Xia's shares had been bought out, and that Xia no longer had any stake in the club.

On 15 December 2023, Aston Villa announced that Comcast-backed American investment firm Atairos would invest in V Sports, the ultimate parent company of the club. The agreement, which saw Atairos obtain a stake of approximately 20% in V Sports, valued Villa at more than £500 million. The deal with Atairos was finalised on 12 April 2024, with Atairos CEO and former Comcast CFO Michael Angelakis appointed to Villa's board of directors.

== Social responsibility ==
Aston Villa has a unique relationship with the Acorns Children's Hospice charity that is groundbreaking in English football. In a first for the Premier League, Aston Villa donated the front of its kit shirts, usually reserved for high-paying sponsorships, to Acorns Hospice so that the charity would gain significant additional visibility and more funds. Outside of the shirt sponsorship, the club has paid for hospice care for the charity, as well as regularly providing player visits to hospice locations. In September 2010, Aston Villa launched an initiative at Villa Park called Villa Midlands Food (VMF) where the club will spend two years training students with Aston Villa hospitality and events in association with Birmingham City Council. The club opened a restaurant in the Trinity Road Stand staffed with twelve students recruited from within a ten-mile (16 km) radius of Villa Park, with most of the food served in the restaurant sourced locally.

=== Aston Villa Foundation ===
In 2016, Aston Villa created a registered charity, the Aston Villa Foundation. The aim of the charity is to deliver the social responsibility work of Aston Villa. Working alongside key local and national stakeholders, the Foundation delivers projects such as football in the community, disability, health and wellbeing, education, interventions and community relations. In May 2021, Prince William, Duke of Cambridge, met with members of the Foundation at Aston Villa's Bodymoor Heath Training Ground. This was following the Foundation providing 1000 hot meals a week to local organisations during the COVID-19 pandemic in the United Kingdom, as well as allowing a local NHS Trust to make use of Villa Park's facilities.

== Supporters and rivalries ==
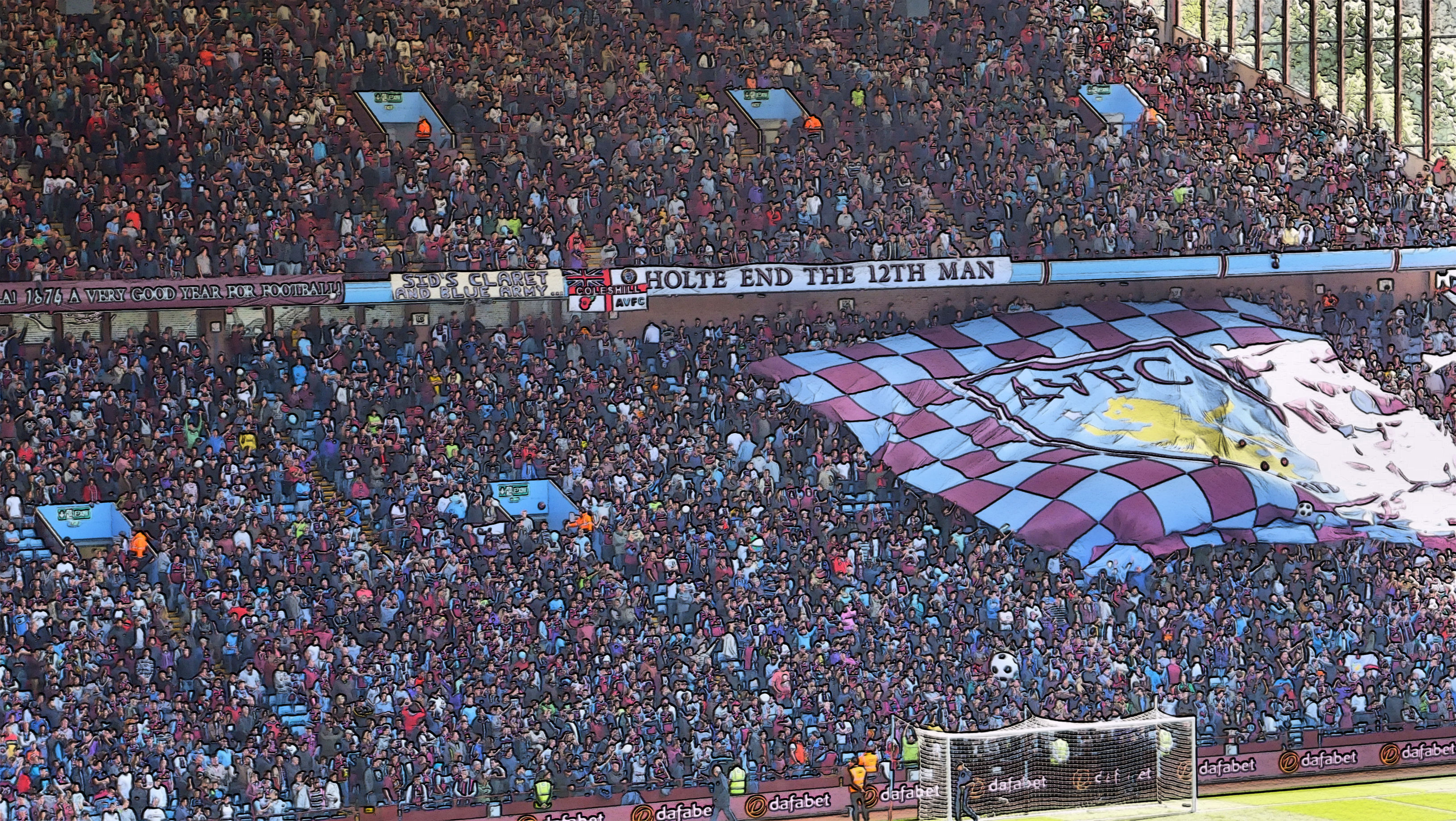
Aston Villa fans in Villa Park's Holte End, proclaiming themselves to be the team's 12th man

Aston Villa have a large fanbase and draw support from all over the Midlands and beyond, with supporters' clubs all across the world. When Randy Lerner's regime took over at Villa Park, they aimed to improve the support from ethnic minorities. A number of organisations have been set up to support the local community, including Aston Pride. A Villa in the Community programme has also been set up to encourage support among young people in the region. The new owners have also initiated several surveys aimed at gaining the opinions of Villa fans and to involve them in the decision-making process. Meetings also occur every three months where supporters are invited by ballot and are invited to ask questions to the board. In 2011, the club supported a supporter-based initiative for an official anthem to boost the atmosphere at Villa Park. The song "The Bells Are Ringing" is to be played before games.

Like many English football clubs, Aston Villa has had several hooligan firms associated with it: Villa Youth, Steamers, Villa Hardcore and the C-Crew, the last mentioned being very active during the 1970s and 1980s. In 2004, several Villa firms were involved in a fight with QPR fans outside Villa Park in which a steward died. As can be seen across the whole of English football, due to incidents like the aforementioned, the hooligan groups have now been marginalised. The main groupings of supporters can now be found in a number of domestic and international supporters' clubs. This includes the Official Aston Villa Supporters Club which also has many smaller regional and international sections. There were several independent supporters clubs during the reign of Doug Ellis but most of these disbanded after his retirement. The supporter group My Old Man Said formed to stand up for Villa supporters' rights, as a direct result of Villa supporters' protest against the club's appointment of Alex McLeish. The club's supporters also publish fanzines such as Heroes and Villains and The Holy Trinity.

Aston Villa's arch-rivals are Birmingham City, with games between the two clubs known as the Second City Derby. Historically though, West Bromwich Albion have arguably been Villa's greatest rivals, a view highlighted in a fan survey, conducted in 2003. The two teams contested three FA Cup finals in the late 19th century. Villa also enjoy less heated local rivalries with Wolverhampton Wanderers and Coventry City. Through the relegation of West Brom and Birmingham City, to the Football League Championship, in the 2005–06 season, at the start of 2006–07 Premiership season, Villa were the only Midlands club in that League. The nearest opposing team Villa faced during that season was Sheffield United, who played 62 miles (100 km) away in South Yorkshire. For the 2010–11 season, West Bromwich Albion were promoted and joined Aston Villa, Wolverhampton Wanderers, and Birmingham City in the Premier League. This marked the first time that the "West Midlands' Big Four" clubs were in the Premier League at the same time, and the first time together in the top flight since the 1983–84 season. Birmingham were relegated at the end of the 2010–11 season, ending this period.

The rivalry with Birmingham City was renewed in 2016–17 when Aston Villa suffered relegation from the Premier League. They were joined by West Brom two years later, but Villa won promotion back to the Premier League in 2019. In 2024, a supporter group named 1897 Group – named after the year that the club first used Villa Park as their home stadium – formed with the stated intention of vocally and visually enhancing the atmosphere for the club's matches at Villa Park. Following a subsequent meeting with club officials, 1897 Group were allocated a section of seats in the stadium's Doug Ellis Stand for a Premier League match against A.F.C. Bournemouth. This launched the group's physical presence at matches. 1897 Group also help to organise and carry out flag and tifo displays in Villa Park's Holte End stand and also in other sections of the stadium for some Villa home matches. Additionally, they have also organised and promoted Villa fan marches where Villa supporters are encouraged by the group to congregate at a designated point in the town or city that Villa are playing in and walk all together to the stadium.

== Records and statistics ==
Chart showing the progress of Aston Villa F.C. through the English football league system

The 2026–27 campaign is Aston Villa's 113th season in the top tier of English football. The only club to have spent longer in the top flight are Everton, with 122 seasons, making Aston Villa versus Everton the most-played fixture in English top-flight football. Aston Villa was relegated from the top tier of English football in 2016, having played in every Premier League season since its establishment in 1992–93, but was promoted back in 2018–19. They are ninth in the All-time Premier League table, and have the fifth-highest total of major honours (20) won by an English club.

Aston Villa currently holds the record number of league goals scored by any team in the English top flight; 128 goals were scored in the 1930–31 season, one more than Arsenal who won the league that season for the first time, with Villa runners-up. Villa forward Archie Hunter became the first player to score in every round of the FA Cup in Villa's victorious 1887 campaign. Villa's longest unbeaten home run in the FA Cup spanned 13 years and 19 games, from 1888 to 1901. Aston Villa are one of six English teams to have won the European Cup. They did so on 26 May 1982 in Rotterdam, beating Bayern Munich 1–0 thanks to Peter Withe's goal. After victory in the UEFA Europa League in 2026, Aston Villa became one of just four English teams to have won both the European Cup and the Europa League.

As of 2024, Aston Villa are only surpassed by Tottenham Hotspur (79), for providing the most England internationals with 77 Villa players debuting for England since 1882.

== Honours ==
Aston Villa have won both European and domestic league honours. The club's last English honour was in 1996 when they won the League Cup, and most recently they won the 2025–26 UEFA Europa League.

=== Domestic ===
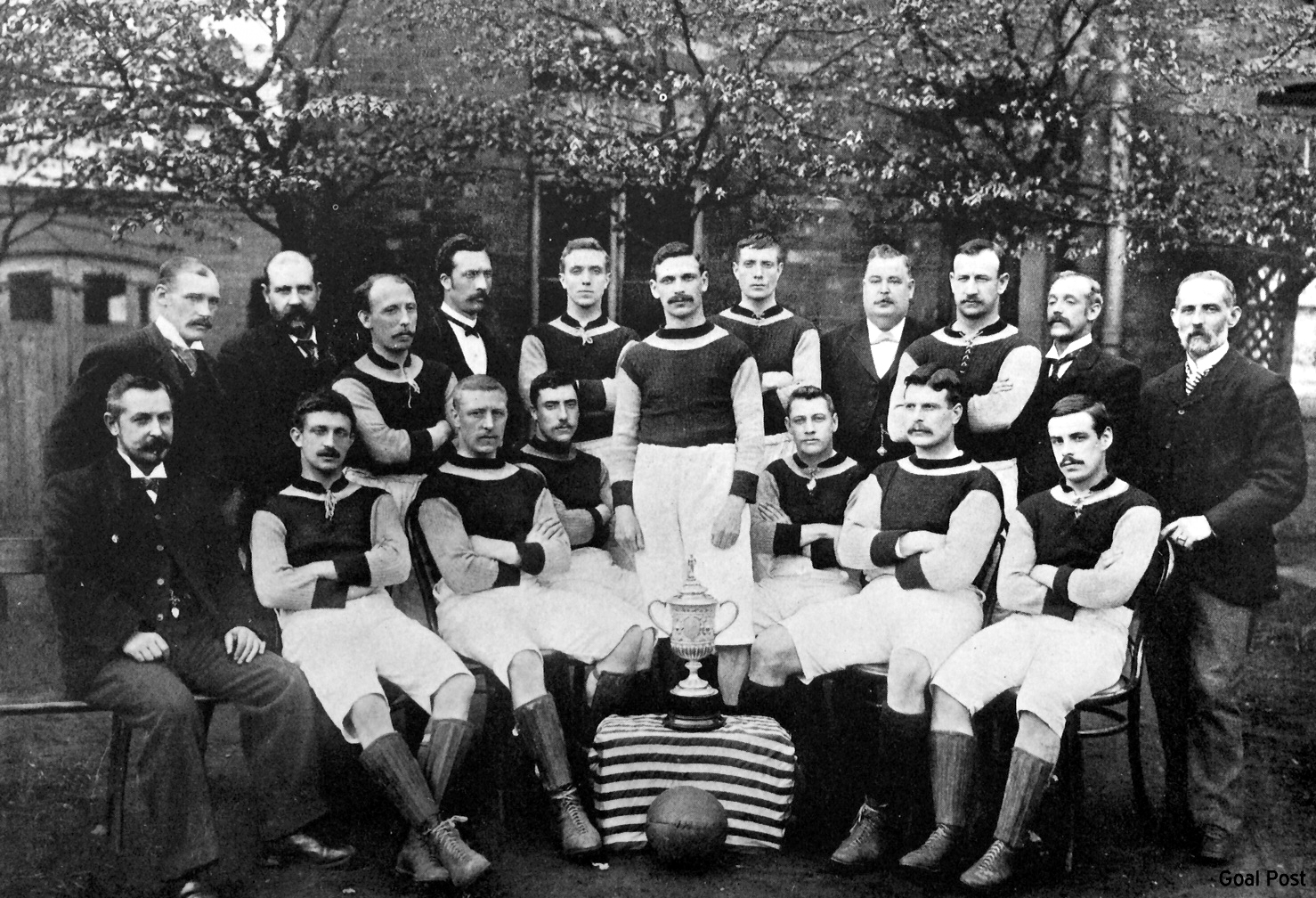
Captain John Devey standing in front of the FA Cup which the club won for the second time in 1895

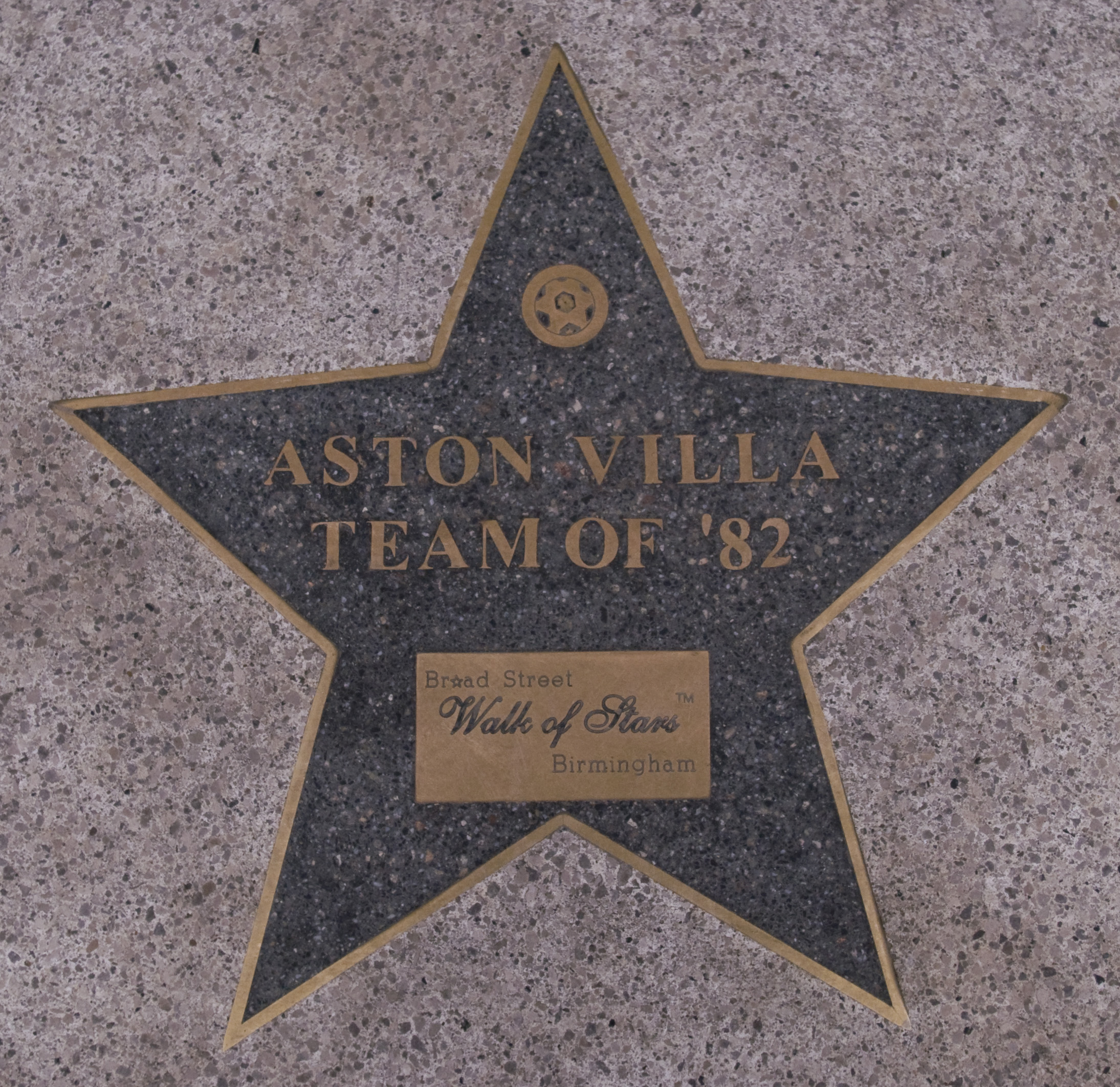
Star on the Birmingham Walk of Stars for the Aston Villa team who became European champions in 1982

League

- First Division / Premier League (level 1)
  - Champions (7): (Note: Up until 1992, the top division of English football was the Football League First Division. The Premier League took over from the First Division as the top tier of the English football league system upon its formation in 1992. The First Division then became the second tier of English football, the Second Division became the third tier and so on. The First Division is now known as the EFL Championship, while the Second Division is now known as EFL League One.) 1893–94, 1895–96, 1896–97, 1898–99, 1899–1900, 1909–10, 1980–81
  - Runners-up (10): 1888–89, 1902–03, 1907–08, 1910–11, 1912–13, 1913–14, 1930–31, 1932–33, 1989–90, 1992–93
- Second Division / Championship (level 2)
  - Champions (2): 1937–38, 1959–60
  - Runners-up (2): 1974–75, 1987–88
  - Play-off winners: 2019
- Third Division (level 3)
  - Champions: 1971–72

Cups

- FA Cup
  - Winners (7): 1886–87, 1894–95, 1896–97, 1904–05, 1912–13, 1919–20, 1956–57
  - Runners–up (4): 1891–92, 1923–24, 1999–2000, 2014–15
- Football League Cup / EFL Cup
  - Winners (5): 1960–61, 1974–75, 1976–77, 1993–94, 1995–96
  - Runners-up (4): 1962–63, 1970–71, 2009–10, 2019–20
- FA Charity Shield
  - Winners: 1981
- Sheriff of London Charity Shield
  - Winners (2): 1899, 1901

=== European ===
- European Cup
  - Winners: 1981–82
- UEFA Europa League
  - Winners: 2025–26
- European Super Cup
  - Winners: 1982
- UEFA Intertoto Cup
  - Winners: 2001 (Note: In 2001, Aston Villa were one of three co-winners of the Intertoto Cup with Paris Saint-Germain and Troyes. The club also won all of their 2008 Intertoto Cup rounds to be named joint-winners and progress to the UEFA Cup; the format was changed in 2006 to award the Intertoto Trophy to the side progressing furthest in the UEFA Cup, which was Braga.)
  - Co-winners: 2008

== Players ==
=== First-team squad ===
As of 2 September 2026

Note: Flags indicate national team as defined under FIFA eligibility rules; some limited exceptions apply. Players may hold more than one non-FIFA nationality.

No.	Pos.	Nation	Player
1	GK	JPN	Zion Suzuki
2	DF	POL	Matty Cash
3	DF	SWE	Victor Lindelöf
4	DF	ENG	Taylor Harwood-Bellis
5	DF	ENG	Tyrone Mings
6	MF	ENG	Ross Barkley
7	MF	SCO	John McGinn (captain)
8	MF	FRA	Boubacar Kamara
10	FW	ARG	Emiliano Buendía
11	FW	SEN	Nicolas Jackson
13	DF	ITA	Matteo Ruggeri
14	DF	ESP	Pau Torres
17	FW	ARG	Alejandro Garnacho (on loan from Chelsea)
18	FW	ENG	Tammy Abraham

No.	Pos.	Nation	Player
19	FW	SEN	Ibrahim Mbaye
22	DF	NED	Ian Maatsen
24	MF	BEL	Amadou Onana
26	MF	NED	Lamare Bogarde
27	MF	GER	Leon Goretzka
29	DF	COD	Aaron Wan-Bissaka (on loan from West Ham United)
35	MF	BRA	João Gomes
39	FW	ENG	Brian Madjo
40	GK	NED	Marco Bizot
42	GK	ENG	James Wright
44	MF	SUI	Johan Manzambi
47	FW	BRA	Alysson
48	DF	SEN	Modou Kéba Cissé
53	MF	ENG	George Hemmings

=== Out on loan ===
Note: Flags indicate national team as defined under FIFA eligibility rules; some limited exceptions apply. Players may hold more than one non-FIFA nationality.

No.	Pos.	Nation	Player
16	DF	ESP	Andrés García (at Getafe until 30 June 2027)
28	FW	NED	Zépiqueno Redmond (at Annecy until 30 June 2027)
29	FW	CIV	Evann Guessand (at Crystal Palace until 30 June 2027)
32	DF	SRB	Kosta Nedeljković (at Rangers until 30 June 2027)

No.	Pos.	Nation	Player
33	FW	ENG	Samuel Iling-Junior (at Bolton Wanderers until 30 June 2027)
46	GK	AUS	Joe Gauci (at Lincoln City until 30 June 2027)
48	GK	POL	Oliwier Zych (at Vitória de Guimarães until 30 June 2027)
58	DF	TUR	Yasin Özcan (at Beşiktaş until 27 January 2027)

=== Under-21s and Academy ===
As of 2 September 2026

Note: Flags indicate national team as defined under FIFA eligibility rules; some limited exceptions apply. Players may hold more than one non-FIFA nationality.

No.	Pos.	Nation	Player
20	MF	ENG	Jamaldeen Jimoh-Aloba
55	DF	ENG	Travis Patterson
57	FW	SCO	Rory Wilson
65	GK	ENG	Sam Lewis
67	FW	ENG	Mason Cotcher

No.	Pos.	Nation	Player
68	MF	ENG	Trai-Varn Mulley
69	MF	NIR	Cole Brannigan
71	DF	ENG	TJ Carroll
79	MF	SCO	Fletcher Boyd
95	GK	ENG	Rhys Oakley

=== Out on loan ===
Note: Flags indicate national team as defined under FIFA eligibility rules; some limited exceptions apply. Players may hold more than one non-FIFA nationality.

No.	Pos.	Nation	Player
28	FW	NED	Zépiqueno Redmond (at Annecy until 30 June 2027)
45	DF	ENG	Triston Rowe (at Sporting De Charleroi until 30 June 2027)
49	MF	ENG	Bradley Burrowes (at Wigan Athletic until 30 June 2027)
51	MF	ENG	Kadan Young (at Annecy until 30 June 2027)
52	GK	ENG	Sam Proctor (at Shrewsbury Town until 30 June 2027)
54	MF	SCO	Aidan Borland (at Accrington Stanley until 30 June 2027)

No.	Pos.	Nation	Player
56	DF	ENG	Lino Sousa (at Shrewsbury Town until 30 June 2027)
58	MF	ENG	Tommi O'Reilly (at Doncaster Rovers until 30 June 2027)
59	DF	SCO	Josh Feeney (at Peterborough United until 30 June 2027)
62	MF	ENG	Ben Broggio (at Stevenage until 30 June 2027)
64	MF	ENG	Kane Taylor (at Rochdale until 31 December 2026)
74	MF	ENG	Luka Lynch (at Oxford United until 2 January 2027)

=== Club captains ===
Since the foundation of the club in 1874, forty-five players have been club captain of Aston Villa. John Devey who was captain from 1891 to 1898, is their most successful captain, leading Villa to five league titles and two FA Cup triumphs during the club's "Golden Age". The present captain is Scotland international John McGinn.

Name	Period
(England) Walter H. Price	1874–1876
(Scotland) George Ramsay	1876–1884
(Scotland) Archie Hunter	1884–1891
(England) John Devey	1891–1898
(England) Jimmy Crabtree	1898–1902
(England) Howard Spencer	1902–1906
(England) Joe Bache	1906–1914
(England) Andy Ducat	1919–1921
(England) Frank Barson	1921–1922
(England) Frank Moss	1922–1927
(England) Billy Walker	1927–1933
(England) Alec Talbot	1933–1934
(England) Eric Houghton	1934–1936
(Wales) Tom Griffiths	1936–1937
(England) Jimmy Allen	1937–1940

Name	Period
(Scotland) Alex Massie	1940–1945
(Scotland) George Cummings	1945–1949
(England) Dicky Dorsett	1949–1951
(Northern Ireland) Danny Blanchflower	1951–1955
(England) Johnny Dixon	1955–1959
(Wales) Vic Crowe	1959–1964
(England) Alan Deakin	1964–1966
(Scotland) Charlie Aitken	1966–1973
(Northern Ireland) Chris Nicholl	1973–1974
(Scotland) Ian Ross	1974–1976
(Northern Ireland) Chris Nicholl	1976–1977
(England) Dennis Mortimer	1977–1984
(Scotland) Allan Evans	1984–1989
(England) Stuart Gray	1989–1992
(England) Kevin Richardson	1992–1995

Name	Period
(Republic of Ireland) Andy Townsend	1995–1997
(England) Gareth Southgate	1997–2001
(England) Paul Merson	2001–2002
(Republic of Ireland) Steve Staunton	2002–2003
(Sweden) Olof Mellberg	2003–2006
(England) Gareth Barry	2006–2009
(Denmark) Martin Laursen	2008–2009
(Bulgaria) Stiliyan Petrov	2009–2012
(Netherlands) Ron Vlaar	2012–2015
(England) Gabriel Agbonlahor	2015–2016
(England) Tommy Elphick	2016–2017
(England) John Terry	2017–2018
(England) Jack Grealish	2018–2021
(England) Tyrone Mings	2021–2022
(Scotland) John McGinn	2022–

=== Notable players ===
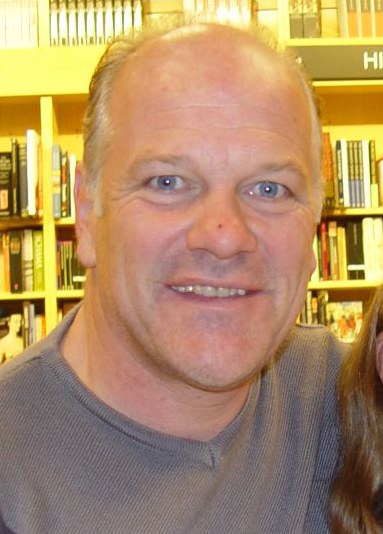
Andy Gray was voted the PFA Players' Player of the Year and PFA Young Player of the Year in 1977.

There have been many players who can be called notable throughout Aston Villa's history. These can be classified and recorded in several forms. The Halls of Fame and PFA Players of the Year are noted below. Aston Villa have had several players who were one-club men, including inaugural club Hall of Fame inductee Billy Walker. In 1998, to celebrate the 100th season of League football, The Football League released a list entitled the Football League 100 Legends that consisted of "100 legendary football players". There were seven players included on the list who played for Villa: Danny Blanchflower, Trevor Ford, Archie Hunter, Sam Hardy, Paul McGrath, Clem Stephenson and Peter Schmeichel (who went on to play for Villa three seasons later). Schmeichel was later inducted into the Premier League Hall of Fame in 2022, with former Villa captain and coach John Terry inducted in 2024.

Aston Villa have had a number of players who have been successful on the international stage while they were at the club. Andy Townsend and Steve Staunton (Republic of Ireland), as well as Olof Mellberg and Victor Lindelöf (Sweden), Stilyan Petrov (Bulgaria), Youri Tielemans (Belgium), and Mile Jedinak (Australia) all captained their national sides in FIFA World Cup finals. Emiliano Martínez appeared fifteen times at the World Cup while at Aston Villa, a record for an active Villa player, and won the first 67 of his senior Argentina caps between 2021 and 2026 while a Villa player. He is currently the most decorated international player for Aston Villa having won the 2021 Copa América, the 2022 Finalissima, the 2022 FIFA World Cup, and the 2024 Copa América; he was awarded the Golden Glove awards at the 2021 and 2024 Copa América and the 2022 World Cup; he was twice named both the Best FIFA Goalkeeper and the Yashin Trophy winner between 2022 and 2024.

Three Aston Villa players have won the PFA Players' Player of the Year award. In 1977, Andy Gray won the award. In 1990, it was awarded to David Platt, whilst Paul McGrath won it in 1993. The PFA Young Player of the Year, which is awarded to players under the age of 23, has been awarded to five players from Aston Villa: Andy Gray in 1977; Gary Shaw in 1981; Ashley Young in 2009, James Milner in 2010 and Morgan Rogers in 2025.

The National Football Museum administers the English Football Hall of Fame which currently contains one Villa team, five Villa players and one manager. The 1982 European Cup-winning team were inducted into the Hall of Fame in October 2011. Former Aston Villa players named in the Hall of Fame are Clem Stephenson, Danny Blanchflower, Peter Schmeichel, Cyrille Regis, and Paul McGrath; as well as former manager Joe Mercer. In 2006, the club announced the creation of an Aston Villa Hall of Fame. This was voted for by fans and the inaugural induction saw 12 former players, managers and directors named. Former club captain Stiliyan Petrov was added to the list in May 2013.

- (England) Gordon Cowans
- (England) Eric Houghton
- (England) Brian Little
- (England) Dennis Mortimer
- (Bulgaria) Stiliyan Petrov
- (England) Ron Saunders (Note: Saunders was never a player for Aston Villa; he was the manager from 1974 to 1982.)
- (England) Peter Withe
- (Republic of Ireland) Paul McGrath
- (Northern Ireland) Peter McParland
- (Scotland) Charlie Aitken
- (Scotland) William McGregor
- (Scotland) George Ramsay
- (England) Billy Walker

== Non-playing staff ==
=== Corporate hierarchy ===
Position	Name
Executive Chairman	Nassef Sawiris
Co-chairman	Wes Edens
President of Business Operations	Francesco Calvo
Chief Commercial Officer	Ron Erskine
Chief Operating Officer	Ben Hatton
Vice President, Content & Digital	Ryan Disdier

=== Management hierarchy ===
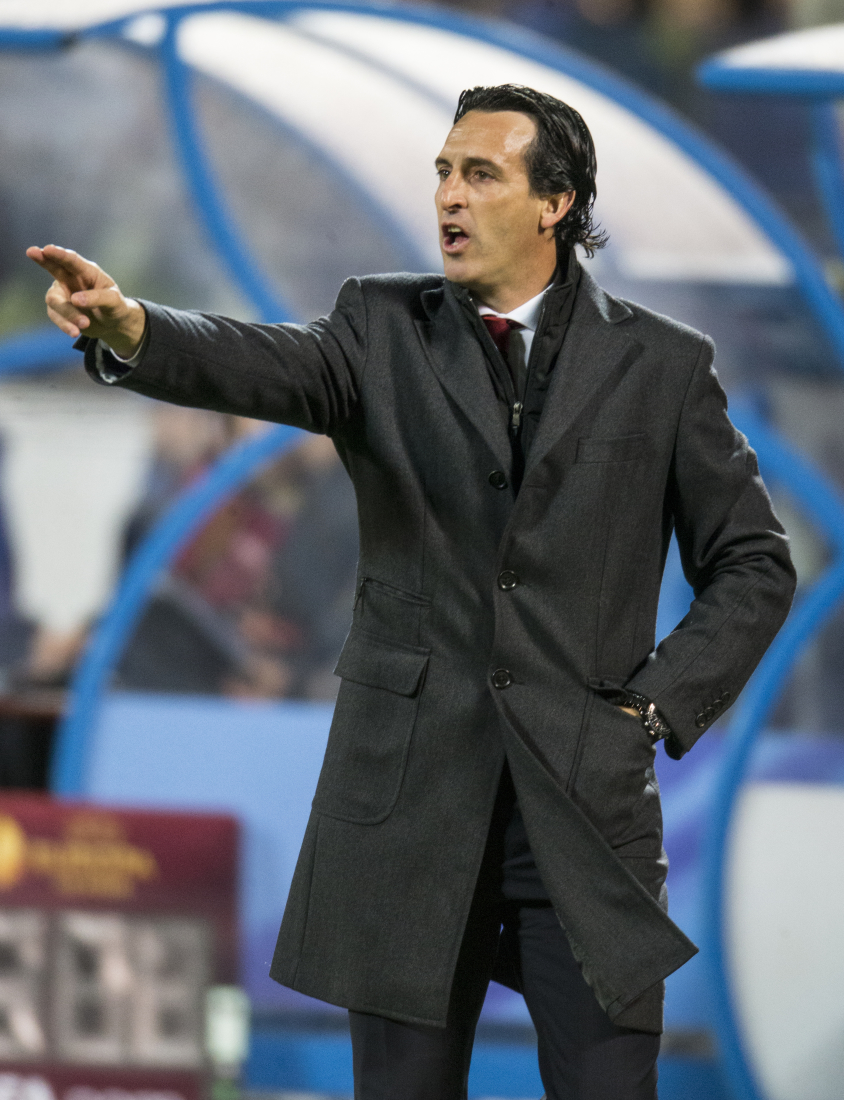
Unai Emery was appointed head coach in November 2022.

Position	Name
Head coach	Unai Emery
President of Football Operations	Roberto Olabe
First Team Coaching Department
Assistant Head Coach	José María Sanz
First-Team Coach	Pablo Villanueva
Goalkeeping Coach	Francisco Javier Garcia
Individual Coach	Vacant
Set-Piece Coach	Pål Fjelde
Analysis Department
Data/Video Analyst	Victor Manuel Manas
Performance Staff & Medical
Head of Strength & Conditioning	Moises de Hoyo
Performance Director	Jeremy Oliver
Lead Physiotherapist	Alan Smith
Head of Sport Medicine & Science	Ricky Shamji
Head Psychologist	Emma Weir
Recruitment
Director of Football Operations	Damian Vidagany
Global Technical Role	Alberto Benito
Head of Recruitment	Vacant
Head of Emerging Talents & Loans	Adam Henshall
Chief Scout	Alex Fraser
Scout	Pablo Rodriguez
Academy
Global Director of Football Development and International Academies	Matthew Kidson
Academy Manager	Mark Harrison
Assistant Academy Manager	Sean Verity
Under-21 Head Coach	Jimmy Shan
Under-21 Professional Development Coach	Dan Green
Under-21 Professional Development Coach	Peter Gilbert
Emerging Talent Programme Manager	Tony Carss
Under-18 Head Coach	Richard Beale
Under-18 Professional Development Coach	Adem Atay
Under-18 Professional Development Coach	Karl Hooper

=== Notable managers ===
The following managers have all won at least one trophy when in charge or have been notable for Villa in the context of the League, for example Jozef Vengloš who holds a League record.

Name	Period		Played	Won	Drawn	Lost	Win% (Note: Win percentage is rounded to two decimal places.)	Honours
Name	From	To	Played	Won	Drawn	Lost	Win%	Honours
George Ramsay	1 August 1884	31 May 1926	1,327	658	414	255	49.59	6 Division One championships, 6 FA Cups. Inducted into the Aston Villa Hall of Fame in 2006.
Jimmy Hogan	1 November 1936	1 September 1939	124	57	26	41	45.97	Division Two champions
Eric Houghton	1 September 1953	30 November 1958	250	88	65	97	35.20	FA Cup winner. Inducted into the Aston Villa Hall of Fame in 2006.
Joe Mercer	1 December 1958	31 July 1964	282	120	63	99	42.55	Division Two champions, League Cup winner Inducted into the English Football Hall of Fame
Ron Saunders	4 June 1974	9 February 1982	353	157	98	98	44.48	2 League Cups, Division One champions. Inducted into the Aston Villa Hall of Fame in 2006.
Tony Barton	9 February 1982	18 June 1984	130	58	24	48	44.62	European Cup, European Super Cup
Jozef Vengloš	22 July 1990	28 May 1991	49	16	15	18	32.65	First manager not from Britain or Ireland to take charge of a top-flight club in England.
Ron Atkinson	7 July 1991	10 November 1994	178	77	45	56	43.26	League Cup winner
Brian Little	25 November 1994	24 February 1998	164	68	45	51	41.46	League Cup winner. Inducted into the Aston Villa Hall of Fame in 2006.
John Gregory	25 February 1998	24 January 2002	190	82	52	56	43.16	Intertoto Cup winner
Dean Smith	10 October 2018	7 November 2021	100	43	20	37	43.00	Championship play-off winner
Unai Emery	1 November 2022	Present	196	109	34	53	55.61	Europa League winner

== In popular culture ==
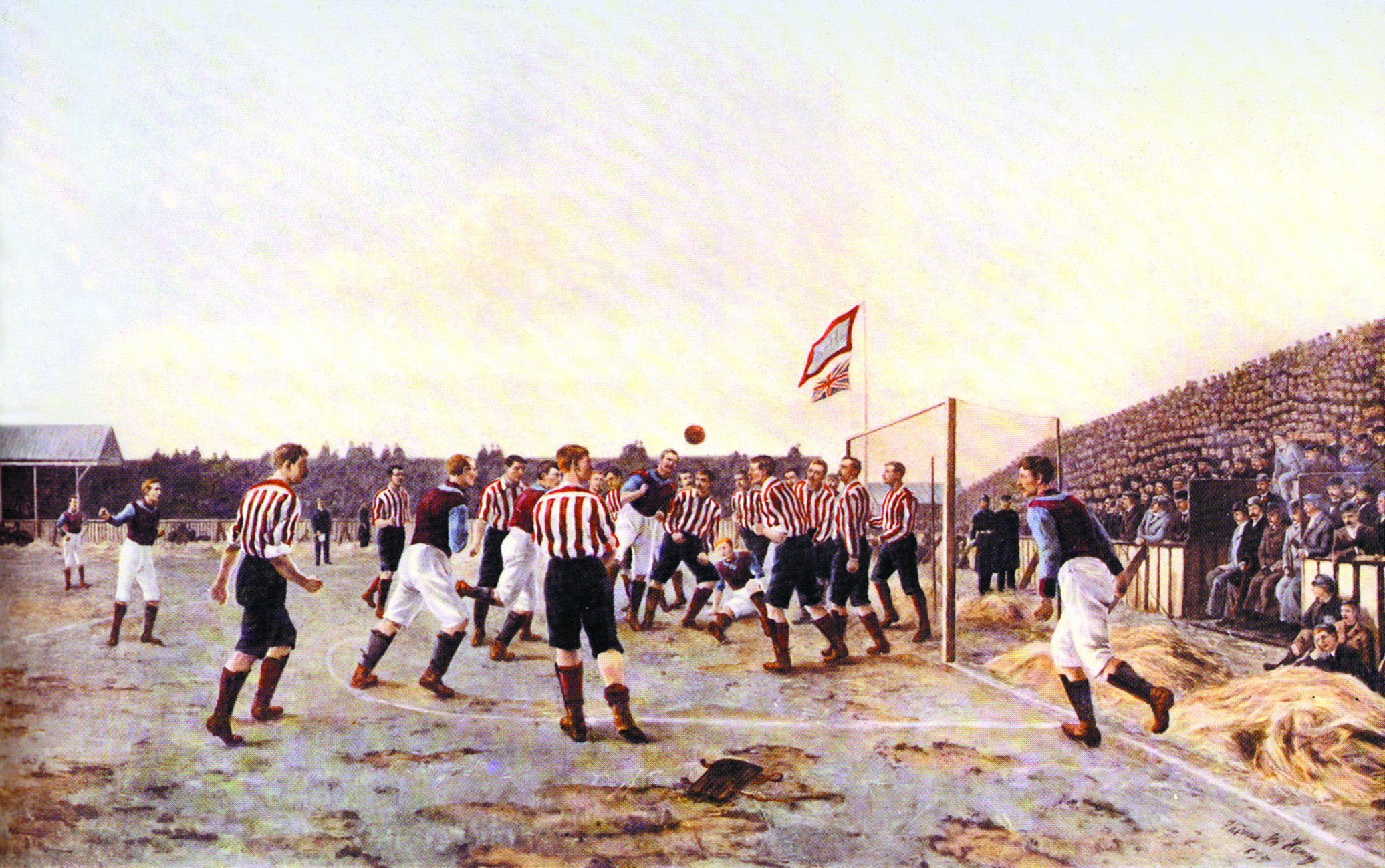
One of the earliest football paintings in the world, Thomas MM Hemy's "Sunderland v. Aston Villa 1895", depicts a match between the two most successful English teams of the decade.

An Aston Villa team were the subject, together with that of Sunderland, of one of the earliest football paintings in the world – possibly the earliest – when in 1895 the artist Thomas M. M. Hemy painted a picture of a game between the teams at Sunderland's then ground Newcastle Road. A number of television programmes have included references to Aston Villa over the past few decades. In the sitcom Porridge, the character Lennie Godber is a Villa supporter. When filming began on Dad's Army, Villa fan Ian Lavender was allowed to choose Frank Pike's scarf from an array in the BBC wardrobe; he chose a claret and blue one – Aston Villa's colours. The character Nessa in the BBC sitcom Gavin & Stacey was revealed as an Aston Villa fan in an episode screened in December 2009.

In the 1952 film The Card, the main character Denry Machin (Alec Guinness) becomes a town councillor and purchases the rights to locally born Aston Villa player 'Callear', the "greatest centre-forward in England", for the failing local football club. Villa have also featured on several occasions in prose. Stanley Woolley, a character in Derek Robinson's Booker shortlisted novel Goshawk Squadron is an Aston Villa fan and names a pre-war starting eleven Villa side. Together with The Oval, Villa Park is referenced by the poet Philip Larkin in his poem about the First World War, MCMXIV. Aston Villa are also mentioned in Harold Pinter's play The Dumb Waiter.

The club receive a passing mention in Aldous Huxley's debut novel Crome Yellow. Notable supporters of Aston Villa include Prince William, former Prime Minister David Cameron, musicians Ozzy Osbourne and Geezer Butler of Black Sabbath, actor Tom Hanks, violinist Nigel Kennedy, golfer Justin Rose, and Harry Potter actors David Bradley and Oliver Phelps.

== Aston Villa Women ==
Aston Villa have a women's football side that compete in the Women's Super League having been promoted as champions of the 2019–20 FA Women's Championship. They were founded as Solihull F.C. in 1973 and affiliated to Aston Villa in 1989.
