= My Old Man Said =

Aston Villa F.C. supporters' group publication

- Website type: Supporter-led media
- Available in: English
- Headquarters: UK
- Founder: David Michael
- Editor: David Michael
- Website: www.myoldmansaid.com
- Launched: June 2011 (site 2012)
- Current status: Active

My Old Man Said (commonly abbreviated as MOMS) is a UK-based supporter-led media platform, podcast, and supporters’ community focused on Aston Villa Football Club. It is affiliated with the Football Supporters' Association (FSA) and Football Supporters Europe (FSE), and was an inaugural member and former chair of the Aston Villa Fan Advisory Board.

== History and Background ==
Established in 2011 by Aston Villa supporter, writer, and journalist David Michael (inc. The Times, Sydney Morning Herald, BBC, GQ, Vogue, FHM, Rolling Stone, Filmink, The Big Issue, The Evening Standard, The Independent), who first requested the club to issue an announcement to Villa supporters to admit their interest in Alex McLeish as a potential managerial candidate, to ensure supporters wouldn't be protesting over just press rumours. Michael then helped oversee the resulting peaceful protest against the appointment; liaising with fans, the club and the West Midlands Police.

MOMS originated from the ashes of the supporter protest against the controversial appointment of Aston Villa F.C. manager Alex McLeish.

The group and site takes its name from the Aston Villa supporters' song "My Old Man".

== Advocacy and Influence ==
My Old Man Said (MOMS) has been an active voice in supporter representation, having served for several years on Aston Villa’s Fan Advisory Board and the original Fan Consultation Group. It also served on the inaugural National Council of the Football Supporters' Association, when the new organisation formed in 2019. It has consistently campaigned for fair ticket pricing, safe standing, and greater supporter input on club decisions.

MOMS has played a direct role in several fan-focused outcomes, including:

- reductions in domestic cup ticket prices and safeguarding against unreasonable season ticket rises over the years,
- the introduction of the @AVFCSupport Twitter channel to improve club–supporter communication
- secured the listing of Villa Park stadium as an asset of community value (ACV) in 2018
- facilitating the inclusion of active and diverse supporter communities in the club's Fan Consultation Group
- the provision of free sanitary products in female toilets at Villa Park
- involved and credited in the government's Fan-Led Review of Football Governance 2021
- the removal of the 20% fee on ticket resales for season ticket holders in 2025 and making sure there was no 'arrangement fee' on fan's interest free season ticket payment agreements

== Media ==
The My Old Man Said website won the 'Best New Football Blog' award in 2012 and the judges' award for the 'Best Established Football Blog' in 2014. MOMS was also a nominee in the 2016 (Best Blogger) and 2018 ('Best Fan Media') FSA Awards.

== Podcast ==
Cover art for the My Old Man Said podcast

Started in 2016, the My Old Man Said podcast is released twice a week and offers a mix of insight, irreverence and supporter perspective on Aston Villa. In 2019, it was nominated in the Best Club Podcast of the Year category in the Football Supporters’ Association Awards. The show is the designated Aston Villa podcast on the Talksport Podcast Fan Network, which represents all 92 English league clubs and was launched in 2023.

The podcast also runs a listener membership, which offers ad-free and bonus episodes, along with access to Match Club — a 24/7 supporter community for dedicated listeners.

== Some of the My Old Man Said's actions ==
- Getting Aston Villa F.C. and Celtic F.C. fans wishes for a charity game between the two teams in honour of the club's captain Stiliyan Petrov into national and international press.
- Organising the 6th minute celebratory applause for Fabrice Muamba of Bolton Wanderers, when Bolton visited Villa Park, to mark his incredible recovery.
- Organised a crowdfunded advert in the local Birmingham Mail to remind the club that supporters do know something about the business of football, which The Guardian called an ‘unprecedented step’
- Obtained an apology from West Ham United for the Aston Villa away fans at the opening game of the 2012/13 season at the Boleyn Ground, who suffered poor catering conditions during a heat wave.
- Attended the FSF's Safe Standing Campaign visit to Parliament on 11 December 2012, that aimed to raise awareness and discussion amongst MP's.
- Formed a consortium of Villa fans 'Holte Enders in the Sun' who within a 24-hour period before the deadline of share issue, managed to make the 100+ share club of Real Oviedo shareholders, helping to raise over €1000 for the cash stricken Spanish club. Fellow shareholders include the world's richest man Carlos Slim and Real Madrid football club.
- MOMS represented Aston Villa supporters on a football supporters' march on the Premier League offices in London on 19 June 2013 in a protest over the rising cost of football.
- MOMS was present at the Football Supporters Federation march on the Premier League offices in London on 14 August 2014
- With the club facing yet another relegation battle after a long winless run without a single goal scored and with chairman wanting to sell, MOMS joined with two other Villa fansites in issuing a joint open letter to Villa supporters to demonstrate at the Liverpool game at Villa Park on 17 January 2015. The suggestion in the open letter was for a two-part demonstration - refraining from talking seats in the Holte End for the first eight-minutes (marking the number of years of the Lerner administration), followed by 82 minutes of non-stop support (symbolic with the club's finest hour in 1982 winning the European Cup), thus showing two potential futures for the club. The proposed demo successfully generated high-profile blanket coverage of Villa's worrying predicament in the media for the week leading up to the game. On the actual day, the club cut the concourse live feeds of the game to flush supporters out and also refrained from using the pre-match surfer flag. A week later, the then club captain Fabian Delph surprisingly signed a new contract. Unknown to supporters at the time, the contract contained a low buy out clause, thus in hindsight it seemed like a short-term PR stunt to appease the growing discontentment amongst Villa fans highlighted by the demo and press coverage.
- My Old Man Said crowdfunded a 20m x 20m giant surfer flag for the Aston Villa vs Arsenal FA Cup Final 2015, based on the classic Sex Pistols album Never Mind the Bollocks, Here's the Sex Pistols, which was then banned by Wembley Stadium and the FA. The ban from Wembley caused outcry in the national press with many papers questioning the decision. The Daily Mirror labelled it a 'bizarre reason.' Both Arsenal supporter groups and the Football Supporters Federation supported the flag and spoke out against Wembley and the FA's decision.
- As a gesture to the Villa supporters who helped fund the banned Wembley surfer flag, MOMS organised with Nottingham Forest to display the flag at the City Ground for Villa's pre-season fixture and then later arranged with Aston Villa for the flag to be used on the Holte End at Villa Park for the visit of Arsenal in the Premier League in December 2015.
- Organised a joint Aston Villa and Stoke City 'Twenty's Plenty' Banner Protest at Villa Park as part of the FSF's weekend of action.
- MOMS was part of the Football Supporter Federation Premier League supporter group rep think tank that helped gain the Premier League £30 away ticket price cap.
- MOMS campaigned on behalf of fans against the Aston Villa's Champions League prices in Fan Advisory Board meetings and in the media.
