= Tony Xia =

Chinese businessman

- Born: Xia Jiantong; Quzhou, China
- Education: Harvard University, Massachusetts Institute of Technology (MIT)
- Occupations: Entrepreneur, investor
- Years active: 1999–present
- Children: 1

Tony Jiantong Xia (Chinese: 夏建统; pinyin: Xià Jiàntǒng) is a Chinese businessman. He is the chairman, CEO and owner of Recon Group.

== Early life and education ==
Xia was born in Quzhou, Zhejiang. At the age of 14, he left home to attend university in Beijing. He was amongst the first 25 of 1,000 selected to study abroad at Harvard (where he studied landscape design), the Massachusetts Institute of Technology (MIT) and a five-month exchange to study at Trinity College, Oxford in 1998–99. He has a PhD as a doctor of design in urban planning.

== Career ==
In March 1999, Xia founded design company XWHO in Boston, US co-owned by his then-girlfriend and one of his lecturers. The company relocated to Hangzhou, China where Xia started a planning company called Teamax, which he sold for £430 million.

=== Recon Group ===
Xia took over Chinese company Recon Group in 2004. The company is based in Beijing and Hangzhou and is the umbrella organisation for Xia's companies which operate in IT, health and agriculture, new energy and smart transportation, engineering and design, financial services, and sports, leisure, and tourism. Xia added he planned to invest in or buy football clubs in India, Spain, the US, and Australia to create a new 'sports sector' within his portfolio.

In February 2017 Recon Group subsidiary Recon Holding agreed to purchase a 51% stake in Millennium Films, a Hollywood film studio specialising in action films including The Expendables series. Previous majority stakeholder and founder Avi Lerner would have remained as Chief Executive Officer with Xia becoming chairman. This deal was later announced to be off in August 2017 due to the Chinese government clamping down on overseas business investments.

On 19 March 2020, Xia announced that the Recon Group had focused attention to their Healthcare and Bioscience division, which was producing and exporting COVID-19 testing kits, hand sanitizer, ventilators, thermometers and PPE to countries around the world that were affected by the COVID-19 pandemic.

=== Aston Villa F.C. ===
On 18 May 2016, it was announced that Recon Group had agreed to buy Aston Villa for a reported £60 million from American businessman Randy Lerner, with the club becoming part of Recon Group's Sports, Leisure and Tourism division. On 14 June 2016, the sale was completed for a reported £76 million after being approved by the Football League. Upon completion of the sale, Xia became chairman of the club.

Xia's tenure at Aston Villa featured heavy investment in the club mainly from borrowing against the clubs existing mortgaging properties and loans against future earnings, but problems with moving cash out of China and into the United Kingdom soon hit Xia and Aston Villa hard. On 5 June 2018, Aston Villa missed the deadline for a £4 million tax bill, and the club was faced with a winding up order and the real possibility of going out of business. On 6 June 2018, Xia suspended Aston Villa's CEO Keith Wyness, who later resigned, after he was alleged to have discussed the prospect of Aston Villa's possible administration and subsequent 12-point deduction with third parties without Xia's knowledge. The following day, 7 June 2018, Xia managed to negotiate an agreement with HM Revenue and Customs to pay £500,000 of the £4 million bill, promising to pay the remaining portion at a later date. This saved the club from immediate danger, but Xia confirmed that the club was still in significant financial difficulty. Xia sold his majority stake in the club to NSWE in July 2018, and became a minority stakeholder and co-chairman.

In June 2019, Keith Wyness took Aston Villa to court for constructive dismissal, however this was settled out of court in favour of Wyness and the club released a statement saying he had acted in the best interests of the club. Wyness later tried to sue Xia directly, but that was also rejected by a judge who stated that the case would be prejudiced against Xia (living in China at the time), who would be required to travel back to the UK to give evidence at considerable financial and time costs.

On 9 August 2019, documents from Companies House revealed that Recon Group's minority share ownership had been bought out, and Xia no longer had any stake in the club.

=== Legal Issues ===
On 18 October 2019, a court in Beijing issued an arrest warrant for Xia. There was a £30,000 reward for information that led to his arrest. Recon Group, and by extension Xia, were accused of Breach of Contract and Non-Payment of Debt. Xia responded via his Twitter account, claiming that the allegations were a fabrication, created by a "local competitor attempting to cause damage to [him]". Xia reportedly spent 6 months in several detention centres in China between July 2020 and January 2021, after being formally arrested on suspicion of harming the interests of a Shenzhen-listed manufacturing company.

A 2021 investigation by Al Jazeera into alleged money laundering in English football claimed that Xia's ownership of Aston Villa may have been part of this. A deal-maker who was speaking to an undercover journalist claimed that the money used was not Xia's, but in fact was a front for an unknown investor. Following this investigation, former colleague Keith Wyness cast doubt on whether Xia was as wealthy as he had claimed, stating "Not a lot was known about him that could be independently verified. My concern was that for a supposed billionaire with a string of companies, Mr Xia appeared not to have a grasp of basic financial modelling."

== Personal life ==
Xia has a home in Beijing. He has a wife, Sally, and one child. He became an Aston Villa fan after watching them at Villa Park during his time as a student at Oxford University. Xia played football at college as a striker.

Xia describes himself as a self-made millionaire. In 2018, his estimated wealth was £1bn.

Xia uses the English name Tony Xia.
