= Christian Purslow =

British businessman

- Born: 14 December 1963 (age 62); United Kingdom
- Education: University of Cambridge; Harvard University
- Occupation: Businessman
- Known for: Co-founder MidOcean Partners; Former managing director of Liverpool F.C. Former head of global commercial activities at Chelsea F.C. Former CEO of Aston Villa F.C.

Christian Purslow (born 14 December 1963) is a British businessman who was most recently the chief executive officer of the Premier League club Aston Villa Football Club. He was the co-founder of private equity firm MidOcean Partners and was the former managing director of Liverpool Football Club and the former managing director and head of global commercial activities at Chelsea Football Club.

== Early life ==
After attending Aylesbury Grammar School, he went on to graduate with a degree in modern and medieval languages at Fitzwilliam College, Cambridge. He later earned an MBA at Harvard Business School where he was a Baker Scholar.

== Career ==
Purslow trained as an analyst with L.E.K. Consulting, before joining the Burton Group as executive assistant to the CEO. After becoming head of new business development for Reuters, he joined Credit Suisse First Boston as head of UK mergers and acquisitions. He then joined Schroders Salomon Smith Barney as head of cable, media and entertainment investment, before becoming managing director of DB Capital Partners. It was while in this position, that DB Capital Partners was spun-out, in which he became managing director of new private equity firm, MidOcean Partners.

=== Liverpool F.C. ===
Purslow was appointed managing director of Liverpool Football Club in June 2009, with a priority to renegotiate the £350m loan the club had outstanding with RBS and to assume overall management of the club until a new permanent CEO could be appointed. Three months into his tenure, a team headed by Purslow negotiated an £80 million 4-year shirt sponsorship deal with Standard Chartered Bank.

On 6 October 2010, Purslow voted in favour of the sale of the club from the unpopular then-owners Tom Hicks and George Gillett to the NESV group. In response to this, Hicks tried to block the sale by removing Purslow and Ian Ayre from the board and installing his son, Mack, and his business associate Lori McCutcheon on the board. On 13 October 2010, at a hearing in the High Court in London, Mr. Justice Floyd held that Hicks’ actions were unlawful and in breach of the agreement he had signed with RBS. Floyd's judgment allowed the sale to proceed and, on 15 October 2010, NESV finally completed its £300m takeover of Liverpool in a deal which drastically reduced the club's debt to RBS.

Having completed his brief by finding a buyer, Purslow stepped down on 20 October 2010 after NESV assumed control of the club. He remained as a non-executive director and special adviser until February 2011.

Following the sale, Hicks and Gillett pursued legal action, however, a settlement was reached in January 2013 with Hicks and Gillett withdrawing all allegations made against Purslow and fellow directors Broughton and Ayre.

=== Chelsea F.C. ===
On 27 October 2014, it was announced that Purslow had joined Chelsea Football Club as "Head of Global Commercial Activities" with immediate effect. Purslow oversaw a number of deals (including Yokohama, Wipro and Carabao) and the club's £900m kit deal with Nike, a deal described by the BBC's Dan Roan as a "remarkable ... coup"

It was announced on 17 February 2017 that Purslow would be leaving Chelsea at the end of the 2017–18 season.

=== Aston Villa F.C. ===
On 31 August 2018, Purslow was appointed as the CEO of Aston Villa Football Club taking over the club in season 2018-19, the club's third consecutive season in the Championship. The club were promoted via the play offs under manager Dean Smith, who Purslow had appointed in October 2018.

The club achieved mid-table finishes in the first three seasons back in the Premier League despite losing star player Jack Grealish to Manchester City at the beginning of the 2021-22 season. Purslow issued a direct video message to Aston Villa fans regarding the sale

Purslow appointed Steven Gerrard as manager in November 2021, having previously worked with Gerrard at Liverpool. and later brought in Unai Emery in October 2022 following Gerrard's dismissal. Emery guided Villa to a 7th place finish in the Premier League season at the end of which, on 12 June 2023, it was announced that Purslow was stepping down from his position as CEO and director at the club. The Times reported that Purslow's decision to step down allowed Emery to increase his control at the club with his long-term ally Monchi appointed as Head of Football Operations. The article, by The Times journalist Martyn Ziegler, quoted West Ham United director Karren Brady as saying that Purslow would be a “huge loss” to the Premier League.

In 2022 Purslow was awarded an honorary doctorate by Aston University.
