= 2026–27 Aston Villa F.C. season =

English football club season

Aston Villa
2026–27 season
- Owner: V Sports (Nassef Sawiris, Wes Edens & Atairos)
- Chairman: Nassef Sawiris
- Manager: Unai Emery
- Stadium: Villa Park
- Premier League: 10th
- FA Cup: Third round
- EFL Cup: Fourth round
- UEFA Champions League: League phase
- UEFA Super Cup: Runners-up
- Top goalscorer: League: Nicolas Jackson (6); All: Nicolas Jackson (9)
- Biggest win: 6–0 v. Fenerbahçe (H); UEFA Champions League, 13 October 2026
- Biggest defeat: 0–4 v. Brighton & Hove Albion (A); Premier League, 23 August 2026
Home colours	Away colours	Third colours

The 2026–27 season is the 152nd season in the history of Aston Villa Football Club, and their eighth consecutive season in the Premier League. In addition to the domestic league, the club is also participating in the FA Cup, the EFL Cup, the UEFA Champions League, and the UEFA Super Cup (as winners of the 2025–26 UEFA Europa League).

This is the first season since 2018–19 without Ezri Konsa, who departed to Arsenal, the first since 2019–20 without Emiliano Martínez (Chelsea) and Ollie Watkins (Al Hilal), and the first since 2020–21 without Lucas Digne (PSG) and Leon Bailey (Olympiacos).

== Players ==
As of 21 November 2026

No.	Player	Position	Nationality	Place of birth	Date of birth (age)	Signed from	Date signed	Fee	Contract end	Apps	Goals
Goalkeepers
1	Zion Suzuki	GK	(Japan)	(United States) Newark	21 August 2002 (age 24)	(Italy) Parma	19 August 2026	£30,000,000	30 June 2031	15	0
40	Marco Bizot	GK	(Netherlands)	Hoorn	10 March 1991 (age 35)	(France) Brest	15 July 2025	Undisclosed	30 June 2027	18	0
42	James Wright	GK	(England)	Manchester	2 December 2004 (age 21)	Manchester City	1 July 2021	Free transfer	30 June 2027	0	0
Defenders
2	Matty Cash	RB	(Poland)	(England) Slough	7 August 1997 (age 29)	Nottingham Forest	3 September 2020	£14,000,000	30 June 2029	241	13
3	Victor Lindelöf	CB	(Sweden)	Västerås	17 July 1994 (age 32)	Manchester United	1 September 2025	Free transfer	30 June 2028	43	0
4	Taylor Harwood-Bellis	CB	(England)	Stockport	30 January 2002 (age 24)	Southampton	1 September 2026	£25,000,000	30 June 2031	4	0
5	Tyrone Mings	CB	(England)	Bath	13 March 1993 (age 33)	Bournemouth	8 July 2019	£26,000,000	30 June 2027	219	9
13	Matteo Ruggeri	LB	(Italy)	San Giovanni Bianco	11 July 2002 (age 24)	(Spain) Atlético Madrid	19 August 2026	£17,000,000	30 June 2030	5	0
14	Pau Torres	CB	(Spain)	Villarreal	16 January 1997 (age 29)	(Spain) Villarreal	12 July 2023	£31,500,000	30 June 2028	122	2
22	Ian Maatsen	LB	(Netherlands)	Vlaardingen	10 March 2002 (age 24)	Chelsea	28 June 2024	£37,500,000	30 June 2032	101	3
29	Aaron Wan-Bissaka	RB	(Democratic Republic of the Congo)	(England) Croydon	26 November 1997 (age 28)	West Ham United	21 August 2026	Season-long loan	30 June 2027	10	0
48	Modou Kéba Cissé	CB	(Senegal)	Dakar	4 August 2005 (age 21)	(Austria) LASK	15 June 2026	£4,000,000	30 June 2031	0	0
55	Travis Patterson	LB	(England)	Wolverhampton	6 October 2005 (age 21)	Academy	1 July 2024	—N/a	30 June 2028	1	0
Midfielders
6	Ross Barkley	CM	(England)	Liverpool	5 December 1993 (age 32)	Luton Town	1 July 2024	£5,000,000	30 June 2027	94	14
7	John McGinn (c)	CM	(Scotland)	Glasgow	18 October 1994 (age 32)	(Scotland) Hibernian	8 August 2018	£3,000,000	30 June 2028	347	43
8	Boubacar Kamara	DM	(France)	Marseille	23 November 1999 (age 26)	(France) Marseille	1 July 2022	Free transfer	30 June 2030	138	3
10	Emiliano Buendía	AM	(Argentina)	Mar del Plata	25 December 1996 (age 29)	Norwich City	10 June 2021	£33,000,000	30 June 2027	167	24
20	Jamaldeen Jimoh-Aloba	AM	(England)	Birmingham	2 October 2006 (age 20)	Academy	1 July 2023	—N/a	30 June 2029	6	1
24	Amadou Onana	DM	(Belgium)	(Senegal) Dakar	20 August 2001 (age 25)	Everton	22 July 2024	£50,000,000	30 June 2031	72	7
26	Lamare Bogarde	DM/RB	(Netherlands)	Rotterdam	5 January 2004 (age 22)	(Netherlands) Feyenoord	1 September 2020	Free transfer	30 June 2028	66	0
27	Leon Goretzka	DM	(Germany)	Bochum	6 February 1995 (age 31)	(Germany) Bayern Munich	27 August 2026	Free transfer	30 June 2028	9	1
35	João Gomes	CM	(Brazil)	Rio de Janeiro	12 February 2001 (age 25)	Wolverhampton Wanderers	20 July 2026	£38,000,000	30 June 2031	13	0
44	Johan Manzambi	CM	(Switzerland)	Geneva	14 October 2005 (age 21)	(Germany) SC Freiburg	17 July 2026	£52,000,000	30 June 2031	11	3
79	Fletcher Boyd	AM	(Scotland)	Aberdeen	26 January 2008 (age 18)	(Scotland) Aberdeen	4 September 2025	£1,000,000	30 June 2031	0	0
Forwards
11	Nicolas Jackson	CF	(Senegal)	Djibonker	20 June 2001 (age 25)	Chelsea	28 August 2026	£47,500,000	30 June 2031	15	9
17	Alejandro Garnacho	LW	(Argentina)	(Spain) Madrid	1 July 2004 (age 22)	Chelsea	23 July 2026	Season-long Loan	30 June 2027	8	0
18	Tammy Abraham	CF	(England)	Camberwell	2 October 1997 (age 29)	(Turkey) Beşiktaş	27 January 2026	£18,000,000	30 June 2030	67	32
19	Ibrahim Mbaye	RW	(Senegal)	(France) Trappes	24 January 2008 (age 18)	(France) Paris Saint-Germain	1 September 2026	£47,000,000	30 June 2032	13	0
39	Brian Madjo	CF	(England)	Enfield	9 January 2009 (age 17)	(France) Metz	12 January 2026	£10,000,000	30 June 2032	5	1
47	Alysson	RW	(Brazil)	Apucarana	5 May 2006 (age 20)	(Brazil) Grêmio	1 January 2026	£8,700,000	30 June 2031	20	2
53	George Hemmings	LW	(England)	Derby	3 April 2007 (age 19)	Nottingham Forest	9 January 2024	Undisclosed	30 June 2032	15	0
57	Rory Wilson	CF	(Scotland)	Girvan	5 January 2006 (age 20)	(Scotland) Rangers	1 July 2022	£300,000	30 June 2027	0	0
67	Mason Cotcher	CF	(England)	Sunderland	4 September 2006 (age 20)	Sunderland	12 August 2024	Free transfer	30 June 2027	0	0
Out on loan
16	Andrés García	RB	(Spain)	Valencia	7 February 2003 (age 23)	(Spain) Levante	21 January 2025	£6,000,000	30 June 2029	18	0
28	Zépiqueno Redmond	CF	(Netherlands)	Rotterdam	22 June 2006 (age 20)	(Netherlands) Feyenoord	1 July 2025	Free transfer	30 June 2029	0	0
29	Evann Guessand	RW/LW/CF	(Ivory Coast)	(France) Ajaccio	1 July 2001 (age 25)	(France) Nice	8 August 2025	£26,000,000	30 June 2030	21	2
32	Kosta Nedeljković	RB	(Serbia)	Smederevo	16 December 2005 (age 20)	(Serbia) Red Star Belgrade	22 January 2024	£6,500,000	30 June 2029	10	0
33	Samuel Iling-Junior	LW/RW/LWB	(England)	Islington	10 April 2003 (age 23)	(Italy) Juventus	1 July 2024	£11,900,000	30 June 2029	0	0
45	Triston Rowe	RB	(England)	Sandwell	2 October 2006 (age 20)	West Bromwich Albion	1 July 2021	Free transfer	30 June 2027	0	0
46	Joe Gauci	GK	(Australia)	Adelaide	4 July 2000 (age 26)	(Australia) Adelaide United	1 February 2024	£1,290,000	30 June 2028	2	0
48	Oliwier Zych	GK	(Poland)	Gdynia	28 June 2004 (age 22)	(Poland) Zagłębie Lubin	29 September 2020	Free transfer	30 June 2027	0	0
49	Bradley Burrowes	CM	(England)	Bristol	4 March 2008 (age 18)	Bristol Rovers	24 May 2025	Free transfer	30 June 2031	1	0
51	Kadan Young	RW	(England)	Erdington	19 January 2006 (age 20)	Academy	20 January 2023	—N/a	30 June 2028	3	0
54	Aidan Borland	CM	(Scotland)	Glasgow	25 April 2007 (age 19)	(Scotland) Celtic	1 March 2024	Free transfer	30 June 2028	1	0
56	Lino Sousa	LB	(England)	(Portugal) Lisbon	19 January 2005 (age 21)	Arsenal	1 February 2024	Undisclosed	30 June 2028	0	0
58	Yasin Özcan	CB	(Turkey)	Kağıthane	20 April 2006 (age 20)	(Turkey) Kasımpaşa	1 June 2025	£5,830,000	30 June 2028	0	0
58	Tommi O'Reilly	CM	(England)	Birmingham	15 December 2003 (age 22)	Academy	1 July 2021	—N/a	30 June 2028	1	0
59	Josh Feeney	CB	(Scotland)	(England) Blackpool	6 May 2005 (age 21)	Fleetwood Town	6 July 2021	Free transfer	30 June 2028	0	0
62	Ben Broggio	LW/RW/AM	(England)	Sutton Coldfield	29 January 2007 (age 19)	Academy	2 February 2024	—N/a	30 June 2030	1	0
64	Kane Taylor	CM	(England)	Birmingham	20 February 2005 (age 21)	Manchester City	20 August 2024	£750,000	30 June 2027	0	0
74	Luka Lynch	LW/RW	(England)		11 January 2007 (age 19)	West Bromwich Albion	1 July 2022	Free transfer	30 June 2027	0	0

== Transfers and contracts ==
=== In ===
Date	Pos.	Player	From	Fee	Ref.
First team
15 June 2026 (Note: The transfer was announced on 19 July, and became official on 15 June once the transfer window opened.)	CB	(Senegal) Modou Kéba Cissé	(Austria) LASK	£4,000,000	
17 July 2026	CM	(Switzerland) Johan Manzambi	(Germany) SC Freiburg	£52,000,000	
20 July 2026	CM	(Brazil) João Gomes	(England) Wolverhampton Wanderers	£34,000,000 (Note: An initial £34,000,000, with a potential further £4,000,000 in add-ons.)	
19 August 2026	LB	(Italy) Matteo Ruggeri	(Spain) Atlético Madrid	£17,000,000	
19 August 2026	GK	(Japan) Zion Suzuki	(Italy) Parma	£25,600,000 (Note: An initial £25,600,000, with a potential £4,300,000 in add-ons.)	
27 August 2026	CM	(Germany) Leon Goretzka	(Germany) Bayern Munich	Free	
28 August 2026	CF	(Senegal) Nicolas Jackson	(England) Chelsea	£47,500,000 (Note: An initial £47,500,000, with a potential further £17,500,000 in add-ons.)	
1 September 2026	CB	(England) Taylor Harwood-Bellis	(England) Southampton	£25,000,000 (Note: An initial £25,000,000, with a potential further £5,000,000 in add-ons.)	
1 September 2026	RW	(Senegal) Ibrahim Mbaye	(France) Paris Saint-Germain	£47,000,000	
Under-21s and Academy
9 July 2026	GK	(England) Blade Earley	(England) Cambridge United	Free	
6 October 2026	LW	(England) Jake Doughty	(England) Everton	Undisclosed	

=== Out ===
Date	Pos.	Player	To	Fee	Ref.
First team
29 June 2026 (Note: The transfer was announced on 26 May, and became official on 29 June once the Serie A transfer window opened.)	CF	(Netherlands) Donyell Malen	(Italy) Roma	£21,600,000	
1 July 2026 (Note: The transfer was announced on 7 October, and became official on 1 July once the Portuguese transfer window opened.)	CM	(Argentina) Enzo Barrenechea	(Portugal) Benfica	£10,300,000	
14 July 2026	CM	(Belgium) Youri Tielemans	(England) Manchester United	£35,000,000	
15 July 2026	LW	(England) Lewis Dobbin	(England) Southampton	£9,000,000	
21 July 2026	AM	(England) Morgan Rogers	(England) Chelsea	£117,000,000	
9 August 2026	LB	(France) Lucas Digne	(France) Paris Saint-Germain	£8,500,000	
21 August 2026	CB	(England) Ezri Konsa	(England) Arsenal	£51,000,000 (Note: An initial £51,000,000, with a potential £4,000,000 in add-ons.)	
30 August 2026	GK	(Argentina) Emiliano Martínez	(England) Chelsea	£7,500,000	
30 August 2026	CF	(England) Ollie Watkins	(Saudi Arabia) Al Hilal	£50,000,000	
2 September 2026	RW	(Jamaica) Leon Bailey	(Greece) Olympiacos	£3,400,000	
Under-21s and Academy
2 July 2026	CB	(Netherlands) Sil Swinkels	(England) Sheffield Wednesday	Undisclosed	
9 July 2026	LW	(England) Louie Barry	(England) Sheffield Wednesday	Undisclosed	
16 July 2026	CB	(Colombia) Yeimar Mosquera	(Portugal) Vitória de Guimarães	Undisclosed	
17 July 2026	CM	(Ivory Coast) Mohamed Koné	(France) Annecy	Undisclosed	

=== Loaned in ===
Date	Pos.	Player	From	Date until	Ref.
First team
23 July 2026	LW	(Argentina) Alejandro Garnacho	(England) Chelsea	End of season	
21 August 2026	RB	(Democratic Republic of the Congo) Aaron Wan-Bissaka	(England) West Ham United	End of season	
Under-21s and Academy

=== Loaned out ===
Date	Pos.	Player	To	Until	Ref.
First team
15 July 2026	GK	(Poland) Oliwier Zych	(Portugal) Vitória de Guimarães	End of season	
16 July 2026	RB	(Spain) Andrés García	(Spain) Getafe	End of season	
28 July 2026	GK	(Australia) Joe Gauci	(England) Lincoln City	End of season	
12 August 2026	RW	(Ivory Coast) Evann Guessand	(England) Crystal Palace	End of season (Note: A conditional obiligation to make the move permanent.)	
14 August 2026	LW	(England) Samuel Iling-Junior	(England) Bolton Wanderers	End of season	
19 August 2026	RB	(Serbia) Kosta Nedeljković	(Scotland) Rangers	End of season	
Under-21s and Academy
7 July 2026	CF	(Netherlands) Zépiqueno Redmond	(France) Annecy	End of season	
8 July 2026	LW	(England) Kadan Young	(France) Annecy	End of season	
17 July 2026	GK	(England) Sam Proctor	(England) Shrewsbury Town	End of season	
21 August 2026	CM	(England) Kane Taylor	(England) Rochdale	31 December 2026	
26 August 2026	CAM	(England) Tommi O'Reilly	(England) Doncaster Rovers	End of season	
30 August 2026	LW	(England) Ben Broggio	(England) Stevenage	End of season	
31 August 2026	CB	(Scotland) Josh Feeney	(England) Peterborough United	End of season	
31 August 2026	LB	(England) Lino Sousa	(England) Shrewsbury Town	End of season	
1 September 2026	RW	(England) Bradley Burrowes	(England) Wigan Athletic	End of season	
1 September 2026	RB	(England) Triston Rowe	(Belgium) Royal Charleroi	End of season	
1 September 2026	CAM	(England) Luka Lynch	(England) Oxford United	31 December 2026	
1 September 2026	CM	(Scotland) Aidan Borland	(England) Accrington Stanley	End of season	

=== Released / out of contract ===
Date	Pos.	Player	Subsequent club	Joined date	Ref.
First team
Under-21s and Academy
30 June 2026	CF	(England) Elijah Briscoe	(England) Coventry City	20 July 2026	
30 June 2026	CAM	(England) I-Lani Edwards	(England) Brackley Town	7 August 2026	
30 June 2026	RB	(England) Jacob Green	Free agent	1 July 2026	
30 June 2026	GK	(Wales) Ronnie Hollingshead	(England) King's Lynn Town	1 July 2026	
30 June 2026	CB	(Wales) Thierry Katsukunya	(Wales) Cardiff City	2 July 2026	
30 June 2026	CAM	(England) Max Lott	(England) Bolton Wanderers	14 August 2026	
30 June 2026	CB	(Northern Ireland) Calum Moreland	Free agent	1 July 2026	
30 June 2026	CAM	(England) Charlie Pavey	(England) Stourbridge	18 July 2026	
30 June 2026	CM	(England) Cole Ramsey	(England) Tottenham Hotspur	7 July 2026	
30 June 2026	CM	(Scotland) Ewan Simpson	(Scotland) Airdrieonians	1 July 2026	
30 June 2026	CB	(Scotland) Kerr Smith	(Scotland) Inverness Caledonian Thistle	17 July 2026	
30 June 2026	CB	(England) Junior Wilson	(England) Birmingham City	8 July 2026	

=== New contract ===
Date	Pos.	Player	End date	Ref.
First team
10 November 2026	CB	(Sweden) Victor Lindelöf	30 June 2028	
11 November 2026	LB	(Netherlands) Ian Maatsen	30 June 2032	
17 November 2026	LW	(England) George Hemmings	30 June 2032	
18 November 2026	CDM	(Belgium) Amadou Onana	30 June 2031	
Under-21s and Academy
15 June 2026	CM	(England) Max Jenner	Undisclosed	
10 July 2026	GK	(England) Sam Lewis	Undisclosed	
16 July 2026	GK	(England) Jack Allan	Undisclosed	
16 October 2026	CM	(Scotland) Jack McGrath	Undisclosed	

== Kits ==
Supplier: Adidas / Sponsor: Visit Rwanda / Sleeve sponsor: Betano

Home	Home alt. 1	Home alt. 2	Away	Away Alt.	Third	Third alt. 1	Third alt. 2

== Pre-season and friendlies ==
On 10 April, Villa announced a pre-season friendly, against Bayern Munich in Hong Kong. On 5 June, a further two friendlies were confirmed against Walsall and Borussia Mönchengladbach. Four days later, a friendly match against Real Sociedad was announced. On 22 June, Aston Villa announced two more friendlies in Asia, and re-arranged the Real Sociedad friendly. On 8 July, a trip to Portugal to face Porto was confirmed. A mid-season friendly was organised for the October international break against Spanish club Sevilla.

Win Draw Loss Fixtures

21 July 2026 Friendly	Walsall	0–5	Aston Villa	Bescot
19:30 BST		Report	Madjo 24', 44'; Hemmings 42'; Lynch 67'; Borland 69'	Stadium: Pallet-Track Bescot Stadium; Attendance: 8,154

25 July 2026 Friendly	Porto	2–1	Aston Villa	Porto, Portugal
20:00 WEST	William Gomes 5'; Pepê 41'; Froholdt (yellow card) 79'	Report	Lynch 12'; Barkley (yellow card) 29'	Stadium: Estádio do Dragão; Attendance: 47,130; Referee: Miguel Fonseca (Portugal)

28 July 2026 Friendly	Aston Villa	2−4	Real Sociedad	Bescot
19:30 BST	Hemmings 14'; Madjo 56'	Report	Soler 22'; Turrientes (yellow card) 32'; Óskarsson 53'; Beitia (yellow card) 54'; Carrera 66'; Rupérez 88'	Stadium: Pallet-Track Bescot Stadium; Attendance: 9,269; Referee: Lewis Smith (England)

1 August 2026 Friendly	Indonesia All Stars	1–3	Aston Villa	Jakarta, Indonesia
19:00 WIB	Arkhan 83'	Report	Buendía 3'; Barkley 45'; Madjo 58'	Stadium: Gelora Bung Karno Stadium; Attendance: 40,000; Referee: Thoriq Alkatiri (Indonesia)

4 August 2026 Friendly	BG Pathum United	1–3	Aston Villa	Pathum Thani, Thailand
20:00 ICT	James (yellow card) 74', (goal) 83'; Buaphan (yellow card) 80'	Report	Buendía 12'; Lindelöf 31'; Kamara 62'	Stadium: True BG Stadium; Referee: Alongkorn Khonwai (Thailand)

7 August 2026 Friendly	Bayern Munich	2–1	Aston Villa	Kowloon, Hong Kong
20:00 HKT	Cardozo (yellow card) 26'; Kim Min-jae 37'; Díaz 73'; Boey (yellow card) 78'	Report	João Gomes 83'	Stadium: Kai Tak Sports Park; Attendance: 38,176; Referee: Poon Chun Kit (Hong Kong)

15 August 2026 Friendly	Borussia Mönchengladbach	2–1	Aston Villa	Mönchengladbach, Germany
15:30 CEST	Kleindienst 32', 35'	Report	Alysson (yellow card) 11'; McGinn (yellow card) 67', (goal) 69'	Stadium: Borussia-Park; Attendance: 50,148; Referee: Sascha Stegemann (Germany)

25 September 2026 Friendly	Aston Villa	1–0	Southampton	Bodymoor Heath
14:00 BST	Garnacho	Report		Stadium: Bodymoor Heath Training Ground; Attendance: 0 (Behind closed doors)

2 October 2026 Antonio Puerta Trophy	Sevilla	1–3	Aston Villa	Seville, Spain
20:30 CEST	Romero 53'	Report	Barkley 71'; Garnacho 79'; Jenner 83'	Stadium: Ramón Sánchez-Pizjuán

== Competitions ==
=== Overall record ===
Competition	First match	Last match	Starting round	Final position	Record							
Competition	First match	Last match	Starting round	Final position	Pld	W	D	L	GF	GA	GD	Win %
Premier League	23 August 2026	30 May 2027	Matchday 1	TBC	11	3	5	3	14	17	−3	27.27
FA Cup	January 2027	TBC	Third round	TBC	0	0	0	0	0	0	+0	—
EFL Cup	16 September 2026	28 October 2026	Third round	Fourth round	2	1	0	1	3	4	−1	50.00
UEFA Champions League	8 September 2026	TBC	League phase	TBC	4	3	0	1	12	6	+6	75.00
UEFA Super Cup	12 August 2026		Final	Runners-up	1	0	0	1	1	2	−1	0.00
Total					18	7	5	6	30	29	+1	38.89

Last updated: 21 November 2026
Source: Soccerway

=== Premier League ===
==== League table ====
Pos	Team	Pld	W	D	L	GF	GA	GD	Pts
9	Tottenham Hotspur	11	4	3	4	12	11	+1	15
10	Brentford	10	3	5	2	16	11	+5	14
11	Aston Villa	11	3	5	3	14	17	−3	14
12	Newcastle United	11	3	4	4	15	18	−3	13
13	Coventry City	11	4	0	7	13	21	−8	12

Updated to match(es) played on 21 November 2026. Source: Premier League
Rules for classification: 1) Points; 2) Goal difference; 3) Goals scored; 4) If the champions, relegated teams or qualified teams for UEFA competitions cannot be determined by rules 1 to 3 following the completion of the competition, rules 4.1 to 4.3 are applied between such teams – 4.1) Head-to-head points; 4.2) Head-to-head away goals; 4.3) Play-off at a neutral site.

==== Results summary ====
Overall								Home						Away					
Pld	W	D	L	GF	GA	GD	Pts	W	D	L	GF	GA	GD	W	D	L	GF	GA	GD
11	3	5	3	14	17	−3	14	1	3	2	6	7	−1	2	2	1	8	10	−2

Last updated: 21 November 2026.
Source: Soccerway

==== Results by round ====
Round	1	2	3	4	5	6	7	8	9	10	11	12	13	14	15	16	17	18	19	20	21	22	23	24	25	26	27	28	29	30	31	32	33	34	35	36	37	38
Ground	A	H	A	H	A	H	A	H	H	A	H	A	H	H	A	A	H	H	A	A	H	A	H	A	H	A	H	A	H	A	H	A	H	A	A	H	A	H
Result	L	L	D	L	W	D	W	W	D	D																												
Position	20	19	17	19	16	16	12	9	10																													
Points	0	0	1	1	4	5	8	11	12	13																												

Updated to match(es) played on 21 November 2026. Source: Soccerway
A = Away; H = Home; W = Win; D = Draw; L = Loss

==== Matches ====
The Premier League fixtures were announced on 19 June 2026.

Win Draw Loss Fixtures

23 August 2026 1	Brighton & Hove Albion	4–0	Aston Villa	Brighton and Hove
14:00 BST	Lindelöf 8' (o.g.); Groß (yellow card) 10'; Ayari (yellow card) 11'; De Cuyper 18'; Hinshelwood 30', 31'	Report	João Gomes (yellow card) 9', (red card) 40'; McGinn (yellow card) 33'; Cash (yellow card) 90+5'	Stadium: Falmer Stadium; Attendance: 31,746; Referee: Peter Bankes

31 August 2026 2	Aston Villa	0–1	Arsenal	Birmingham
20:00 BST	Alysson (yellow card) 80'; McGinn (yellow card) 81'; Maatsen (yellow card) 90+6'	Report	Tzolis (yellow card) 29'; Saka 59'	Stadium: Villa Park; Attendance: 36,804; Referee: Jarred Gillett
Note: Fixture was originally scheduled for 29 August, but was moved for live Sky Sports broadcasting.

5 September 2026 3	Hull City	0–0	Aston Villa	Kingston upon Hull
17:30 BST	Ajayi (yellow card) 39'; Gourna-Douath (yellow card) 67'	Report		Stadium: MKM Stadium; Attendance: 24,425; Referee: Michael Oliver
Note: Fixture was originally scheduled for a 15:00 kickoff, but was moved for live Sky Sports broadcasting.

12 September 2026 4	Aston Villa	1–2	Nottingham Forest	Birmingham
15:00 BST	Jackson (yellow card) 45'; Alysson 74'; Mings (yellow card) 90+5'	Report	Ndoye (yellow card) 43'; Murillo (yellow card) 45+3'; Delap 46', (yellow card) 75'; Schlager (yellow card) 56'; McAtee (yellow card) 80'; Igor Jesus 88'	Stadium: Villa Park; Attendance: 36,714; Referee: Andy Madley

19 September 2026 5	Tottenham Hotspur	2–3	Aston Villa	Tottenham
12:30 BST	Van Hecke (yellow card) 45+7', (goal) 90+8'; Gallagher 86'	Report	Manzambi 45+4'; Jackson (yellow card) 46', (goal) 67'; Buendía 79'; Cash (yellow card) 90+2'	Stadium: Tottenham Hotspur Stadium; Attendance: 60,920; Referee: Sam Barrott
Note: Fixture was originally scheduled for a 15:00 kickoff, but was moved for live TNT Sports broadcasting.

10 October 2026 6	Aston Villa	2–2	Brentford	Birmingham
15:00 BST	Jackson 12'; Buendía (yellow card) 45+3'; Cash (yellow card) 72'; McGinn 77'	Report	Yarmolyuk 10'; Thiago (yellow card) 35'; Janelt (yellow card) 75'; Ajer 79', (yellow card) 84'; Kayode (yellow card) 82'; Wilson (yellow card) 90+5'	Stadium: Villa Park; Attendance: 36,636; Referee: Craig Pawson

17 October 2026 7	Newcastle United	0–1	Aston Villa	Newcastle upon Tyne
17:30 BST	Joelinton (yellow card) 18'; Botman (yellow card) 18'; González (yellow card) 53'; Wissa (yellow card) 55'; Osula (yellow card) 78'; Thiaw (yellow card) 86'	Report	João Gomes (yellow card) 25'; Alysson (yellow card) 28'; Manzambi 36'	Stadium: St James' Park; Attendance: 52,626; Referee: Jarred Gillett
Note: Fixture was originally scheduled for a 15:00 kick off, but was moved for live Sky Sports broadcasting.

24 October 2026 8	Aston Villa	2–1	Manchester City	Birmingham
12:30 BST	Jackson 6', 60'; Manzambi (yellow card) 54'; Cash (yellow card) 55'; Madjo (yellow card) 83'; Buendía (yellow card) 90+5'	Report	Guéhi (yellow card) 32'; Cherki (yellow card) 38'; Haaland 52'; Anderson (yellow card) 74'; McAidoo (yellow card) 76'	Stadium: Villa Park; Attendance: 36,743; Referee: Peter Bankes
Note: Fixture was originally scheduled for a 15:00 kick off, but was moved for live TNT Sports broadcasting.

31 October 2026 9	Aston Villa	1–1	Fulham	Birmingham
20:00 GMT	McGinn (penalty missed) 16'; Jackson 39'; Cash (yellow card) 76'	Report	Affengruber (yellow card) 30'; Bassey (yellow card) 45+4'; Suzuki 64' (o.g.); Cairney (yellow card) 77'	Stadium: Villa Park; Attendance: 34,649; Referee: Sam Barrott
Note: Fixture was originally scheduled for 31 October, but was moved for live Sky Sports broadcasting. It was then reverted to the Saturday for an 20:00 kick-off due to Villa's UEFA Champions League involvements on the following Tuesday.

8 November 2026 10	Manchester United	4–4	Aston Villa	Trafford
16:30 GMT	Fernandes 16' (pen.); Tielemans 44'; Heaven (yellow card) 57'; Zirkzee 90+2'; Dorgu 90+6'	Report	Alysson 1'; Jackson 4'; McGinn 48' (pen.); Goretzka 53'; Suzuki (yellow card) 90+7'	Stadium: Old Trafford; Attendance: 74,149; Referee: Chris Kavanagh
Note: Fixture was originally scheduled for 7 November, but was moved for live Sky Sports broadcasting.

21 November 2026 11	Aston Villa	0–0	Sunderland	Birmingham
15:00 GMT	Goretzka (yellow card) 54'; Maatsen (yellow card) 66'	Report	Hume (yellow card) 38'; Angulo (yellow card) 85'	Stadium: Villa Park; Attendance: 36,701; Referee: Andy Madley

28 November 2026 12	Ipswich Town	v	Aston Villa	Ipswich
17:30 GMT				Stadium: Portman Road
Note: Fixture was originally scheduled for 15:00 kickoff, but was moved for live Sky Sports broadcasting.

2 December 2026 13	Aston Villa	v	Everton	Birmingham
20:15 GMT				Stadium: Villa Park
Note: Fixture was originally scheduled for 20:00 kickoff, but was moved back 15 minutes for live Sky Sports broadcasting.

5 December 2026 14	Aston Villa	v	Crystal Palace	Birmingham
15:00 GMT				Stadium: Villa Park

13 December 2026 15	Coventry City	v	Aston Villa	Coventry
16:30 GMT				Stadium: Coventry Building Society Arena
Note: Fixture was originally scheduled for 12 December, but was moved for live Sky Sports broadcasting.

21 December 2026 16	Chelsea	v	Aston Villa	Fulham
20:00 GMT				Stadium: Stamford Bridge
Note: Fixture was originally scheduled for 19 December, but was moved for live Sky Sports broadcasting.

26 December 2026 17	Aston Villa	v	Leeds United	Birmingham
12:30 GMT				Stadium: Villa Park
Note: Fixture was originally scheduled for a 15:00 kickoff, but was moved for live TNT Sports broadcasting.

30 December 2026 18	Aston Villa	v	Liverpool	Birmingham
20:15 GMT				Stadium: Villa Park
Note: Fixture was originally scheduled for a 20:00 kickoff, but was moved for live Sky Sports broadcasting.

2 January 2027 19	Bournemouth	v	Aston Villa	Bournemouth
17:30 GMT				Stadium: Dean Court
Note: Fixture was originally scheduled for a 15:00 kickoff, but was moved for live Sky Sports broadcasting.

5 January 2027 20	Everton	v	Aston Villa	Liverpool
19:30 GMT				Stadium: Hill Dickinson Stadium
Note: Fixture was originally scheduled for a 6 January, but was moved for live Sky Sports broadcasting.

16 January 2027 21	Aston Villa	v	Manchester United	Birmingham
17:30 GMT				Stadium: Villa Park
Note: Fixture was originally scheduled for a 15:00 kick-off, but was pushed back for live Sky Sports broadcasting.

23 January 2027 22	Fulham	v	Aston Villa	Fulham
15:00 GMT				Stadium: Craven Cottage

30 January 2027 23	Aston Villa	v	Ipswich Town	Birmingham
15:00 GMT				Stadium: Villa Park

6 February 2027 24	Sunderland	v	Aston Villa	Sunderland
15:00 GMT				Stadium: Stadium of Light

10 February 2027 25	Aston Villa	v	Bournemouth	Birmingham
20:00 GMT				Stadium: Villa Park

20 February 2027 26	Leeds United	v	Aston Villa	Leeds
15:00 GMT				Stadium: Elland Road

27 February 2027 27	Aston Villa	v	Chelsea	Birmingham
15:00 GMT				Stadium: Villa Park

3 March 2027 28	Liverpool	v	Aston Villa	Liverpool
20:00 GMT				Stadium: Anfield

13 March 2027 29	Aston Villa	v	Hull City	Birmingham
15:00 GMT				Stadium: Villa Park

20 March 2027 30	Nottingham Forest	v	Aston Villa	West Bridgford
15:00 GMT				Stadium: City Ground

10 April 2027 31	Aston Villa	v	Brighton & Hove Albion	Birmingham
15:00 BST				Stadium: Villa Park

17 April 2027 32	Arsenal	v	Aston Villa	Holloway
15:00 BST				Stadium: Emirates Stadium

24 April 2027 33	Aston Villa	v	Coventry City	Birmingham
15:00 BST				Stadium: Villa Park

1 May 2027 34	Crystal Palace	v	Aston Villa	Selhurst
15:00 BST				Stadium: Selhurst Park

8 May 2027 35	Brentford	v	Aston Villa	Brentford
15:00 BST				Stadium: Brentford Community Stadium

15 May 2027 36	Aston Villa	v	Newcastle United	Birmingham
15:00 BST				Stadium: Villa Park

23 May 2027 37	Manchester City	v	Aston Villa	Manchester
15:00 BST				Stadium: Etihad Stadium

30 May 2027 38	Aston Villa	v	Tottenham Hotspur	Birmingham
16:00 BST				Stadium: Villa Park

=== FA Cup ===
As a Premier League side, Aston Villa enter in the third round.

Win Draw Loss Fixtures

=== EFL Cup ===
As one of the Premier League clubs involved in European competitions, Aston Villa joined the competition in the third round. The third round draw took place on 26 August 2026, with Villa drawn away to Coventry City. The fourth round took place following Aston Villa's third round tie on 16 September, where Villa were drawn away against Bournemouth.

Win Draw Loss Fixtures

16 September 2026 Third round	Coventry City	1–3	Aston Villa	Coventry
20:00 BST	Mfuni (yellow card) 23'; Torp 27'; Yirenkyi (yellow card) 46'; Onyeka (yellow card) 87'	Report	Abraham 7', 59'; Barkley (yellow card) 26', (goal) 40'; Wan-Bissaka (yellow card) 43'; Buendía (yellow card) 90'	Stadium: Coventry Building Society Arena; Attendance: 24,577; Referee: Robert Jones

28 October 2026 Fourth round	Bournemouth	3–0	Aston Villa	Bournemouth
19:45 GMT	Adli 7'; Juanlu (yellow card) 16'; Gannon-Doak (yellow card) 25'; Cook 51', (yellow card) 67'; Rodríguez 69'	Report	Buendía (yellow card) 12'; Madjo (yellow card) 33'; João Gomes (yellow card) 54'	Stadium: Dean Court; Attendance: 12,162; Referee: Tony Harrington

=== UEFA Super Cup ===
As winners of the 2025–26 UEFA Europa League, Aston Villa were entered into the UEFA Super Cup to face the winners of the 2025–26 UEFA Champions League, Paris Saint-Germain, in Salzburg.

12 August 2026 Final	Paris Saint-Germain (France)	2–1	(England) Aston Villa	Salzburg, Austria
21:00 CEST	Kvaratskhelia 20'; Doué 61'	Report	Madjo 45'; Torres (yellow card) 51'; João Gomes (yellow card) 64'; McGinn (yellow card) 72'	Stadium: Red Bull Arena; Attendance: 27,681; Referee: Omar Artan (Somalia)

=== UEFA Champions League ===
==== League phase ====
The draw for the league phase took place on 27 August 2026. The fixture dates were confirmed on 29 August.

Pos	Team	Pld	W	D	L	GF	GA	GD	Pts	Qualification
4	(Italy) Como	4	3	0	1	19	6	+13	9	Advance to round of 16 (seeded)
5	(Spain) Barcelona	4	3	0	1	14	6	+8	9	Advance to round of 16 (seeded)
6	(England) Aston Villa	4	3	0	1	12	6	+6	9	Advance to round of 16 (seeded)
7	(England) Manchester City	4	3	0	1	12	7	+5	9	Advance to round of 16 (seeded)
8	(England) Liverpool	4	3	0	1	14	10	+4	9	Advance to round of 16 (seeded)

Updated to match(es) played on 4 November 2026. Source: UEFA
Rules for classification: League phase tiebreakers

Round	1	2	3	4	5	6	7	8
Ground	A	H	H	A	A	H	H	A
Result	W	W	W	L				
Position	9	3	2	6				
Points	3	6	9	9				

Updated to match(es) played on 3 November 2026. Source: UEFA
A = Away; H = Home; W = Win; D = Draw; L = Loss

Win Draw Loss Fixtures

8 September 2026 1	Club Brugge (Belgium)	2–3	(England) Aston Villa	Bruges, Belgium
18:45 CEST	Vetlesen 19'; Vanaken (yellow card) 48'; Tresoldi 61' (pen.); Virgili (yellow card) 62'; Vermant (yellow card) 89'	Report	Maatsen (yellow card) 9'; McGinn 11', (yellow card) 78'; Buendía 22'; Jackson 43'; João Gomes (yellow card) 90'	Stadium: Jan Breydel Stadium; Attendance: 24,286; Referee: Sandro Schärer (Switzerland)

14 October 2026 2	Aston Villa (England)	6–0	(Turkey) Fenerbahçe	Birmingham, England
20:00 BST	Manzambi 12'; Jackson 31', 39'; Barkley 68' (pen.), 72'; Abraham 90'	Report	Guendouzi (yellow card) 42'; Aydın (yellow card) 78'	Stadium: Villa Park; Attendance: 34,705; Referee: Ivan Kružliak (Slovakia)

21 October 2026 3	Aston Villa (England)	3–1	(Norway) Viking	Birmingham, England
20:00 BST	Barkley 23'; Buendía 37' (pen.); Heggheim 62' (o.g.)	Report	Christiansen 84'	Stadium: Villa Park; Attendance: 33,410; Referee: Sebastian Gishamer (Austria)

3 November 2026 4	Barcelona (Spain)	3–0	(England) Aston Villa	Barcelona, Spain
21:00 CET	Yamal 7'; Raphinha (yellow card) 44', (goal) 52', 64'	Report	Maatsen (yellow card) 11'; Buendía (yellow card) 31'; Jackson (yellow card) 44'	Stadium: Camp Nou; Attendance: 52,662; Referee: Davide Massa (Italy)

24 November 2026 5	Galatasaray (Turkey)	v	(England) Aston Villa	Istanbul, Turkey
20:45 TRT		Report		Stadium: Rams Park

8 December 2026 6	Aston Villa (England)	v	(France) Paris Saint-Germain	Birmingham, England
20:00 GMT		Report		Stadium: Villa Park

19 January 2027 7	Aston Villa (England)	v	(Germany) Borussia Dortmund	Birmingham, England
20:00 GMT		Report		Stadium: Villa Park

27 January 2027 8	Slavia Prague (Czech Republic)	v	(England) Aston Villa	Prague, Czech Republic
21:00 CET		Report		Stadium: Fortuna Arena

== Squad statistics ==
=== Appearances ===
As of 21 November 2026

Players with no appearances are not included on the list, italics indicate a loaned in player.

No.	Pos	Nat	Player	Total		Premier League		FA Cup		EFL Cup		Champions League		Super Cup	
No.	Pos	Nat	Player	Apps	Goals	Apps	Goals	Apps	Goals	Apps	Goals	Apps	Goals	Apps	Goals
1	GK	(Japan) JPN	Zion Suzuki	15	0	10	0	0	0	0+1	0	4	0	0	0
2	DF	(Poland) POL	Matty Cash	12	0	7+1	0	0	0	0	0	2+1	0	1	0
3	DF	(Sweden) SWE	Victor Lindelöf	15	0	10	0	0	0	0	0	4	0	1	0
4	DF	(England) ENG	Taylor Harwood-Bellis	4	0	2	0	0	0	2	0	0	0	0	0
5	DF	(England) ENG	Tyrone Mings	10	0	4+2	0	0	0	2	0	1	0	0+1	0
6	MF	(England) ENG	Ross Barkley	18	4	4+7	0	0	0	1+1	1	2+2	3	0+1	0
7	MF	(Scotland) SCO	John McGinn	18	3	9+2	2	0	0	1+1	0	4	1	1	0
8	MF	(France) FRA	Boubacar Kamara	15	0	11	0	0	0	0	0	3	0	1	0
10	MF	(Argentina) ARG	Emiliano Buendía	16	3	8+2	1	0	0	1+1	0	3	2	1	0
11	FW	(Senegal) SEN	Nicolas Jackson	15	9	10	6	0	0	0+1	0	4	3	0	0
13	DF	(Italy) ITA	Matteo Ruggeri	5	0	2+2	0	0	0	1	0	0	0	0	0
14	DF	(Spain) ESP	Pau Torres	13	0	7+1	0	0	0	0	0	4	0	1	0
17	FW	(Argentina) ARG	Alejandro Garnacho	7	0	0+4	0	0	0	0+1	0	0+2	0	0	0
18	FW	(England) ENG	Tammy Abraham	11	3	0+4	0	0	0	1+1	2	0+4	1	0+1	0
19	FW	(Senegal) SEN	Ibrahim Mbaye	13	0	0+8	0	0	0	2	0	2+1	0	0	0
22	DF	(Netherlands) NED	Ian Maatsen	12	0	8	0	0	0	1	0	2	0	1	0
26	MF	(Netherlands) NED	Lamare Bogarde	5	0	0+1	0	0	0	2	0	0+1	0	0+1	0
27	MF	(Germany) GER	Leon Goretzka	9	1	3+2	1	0	0	1	0	0+3	0	0	0
29	DF	(Democratic Republic of the Congo) COD	Aaron Wan-Bissaka	10	0	4+3	0	0	0	1	0	2	0	0	0
35	MF	(Brazil) BRA	João Gomes	13	0	5+2	0	0	0	1	0	3+1	0	1	0
39	FW	(England) ENG	Brian Madjo	5	1	0+3	0	0	0	1	0	0	0	1	1
40	GK	(Netherlands) NED	Marco Bizot	4	0	1	0	0	0	2	0	0	0	1	0
44	MF	(Switzerland) SUI	Johan Manzambi	11	3	7+1	2	0	0	0+1	0	2	1	0	0
47	FW	(Brazil) BRA	Alysson	17	2	5+5	2	0	0	0+2	0	1+3	0	0+1	0
53	MF	(England) ENG	George Hemmings	11	0	4+2	0	0	0	2	0	1+1	0	1	0

=== Goals ===
As of 21 November 2026

Rank	Pos.	No.	Player	Premier League	FA Cup	EFL Cup	Champions League	Super Cup	Total
1	FW	11	(Senegal) Nicolas Jackson	6	0	0	3	0	9
2	MF	6	(England) Ross Barkley	0	0	1	3	0	4
3	MF	7	(Scotland) John McGinn	2	0	0	1	0	3
3	MF	10	(Argentina) Emiliano Buendía	1	0	0	2	0	3
3	FW	18	(England) Tammy Abraham	0	0	2	1	0	3
3	MF	44	(Switzerland) Johan Manzambi	2	0	0	1	0	3
7	FW	47	(Brazil) Alysson	2	0	0	0	0	2
8	MF	27	(Germany) Leon Goretzka	1	0	0	0	0	1
8	FW	39	(England) Brian Madjo	0	0	0	0	1	1
Own goals				0	0	0	1	0	1
Totals				14	0	3	12	1	29

=== Assists ===
As of 21 November 2026

Rank	Pos.	No.	Player	Premier League	FA Cup	EFL Cup	Champions League	Super Cup	Total
1	MF	7	(Scotland) John McGinn	4	0	0	0	1	5
2	MF	19	(Senegal) Ibrahim Mbaye	1	0	1	2	0	4
3	MF	44	(Switzerland) Johan Manzambi	3	0	0	0	0	3
4	MF	6	(England) Ross Barkley	0	0	1	1	0	2
4	MF	8	(France) Boubacar Kamara	1	0	0	1	0	2
4	DF	14	(Spain) Pau Torres	0	0	0	2	0	2
4	MF	35	(Brazil) João Gomes	1	0	0	1	0	2
8	FW	11	(Senegal) Nicolas Jackson	1	0	0	0	0	1
8	FW	47	(Brazil) Alysson	0	0	0	1	0	1
8	FW	53	(England) George Hemmings	0	0	1	0	0	1
Totals				10	0	3	8	1	22

=== Clean sheets ===
As of 21 November 2026

Rank	No.	Player	Premier League	FA Cup	EFL Cup	Champions League	Super Cup	Total
1	1	(Japan) Zion Suzuki	3	0	0	1	0	4
Totals			3	0	0	1	0	4

=== Disciplinary record ===
As of 21 November 2026

Rank	No.	Pos.	Player	Premier League			FA Cup			EFL Cup			Champions League			Super Cup			Total		
Rank	No.	Pos.	Player	Yellow card	(yellow card) (yellow-red card)	Red card	Yellow card	(yellow card) (yellow-red card)	Red card	Yellow card	(yellow card) (yellow-red card)	Red card	Yellow card	(yellow card) (yellow-red card)	Red card	Yellow card	(yellow card) (yellow-red card)	Red card	Yellow card	(yellow card) (yellow-red card)	Red card
1	35	MF	(Brazil) João Gomes	2	0	1	0	0	0	1	0	0	1	0	0	1	0	0	5	0	1
2	2	DF	(Poland) Matty Cash	5	0	0	0	0	0	0	0	0	0	0	0	0	0	0	5	0	0
2	10	MF	(Argentina) Emiliano Buendía	2	0	0	0	0	0	2	0	0	1	0	0	0	0	0	5	0	0
4	7	MF	(Scotland) John McGinn	2	0	0	0	0	0	0	0	0	1	0	0	1	0	0	4	0	0
4	22	DF	(Netherlands) Ian Maatsen	2	0	0	0	0	0	0	0	0	2	0	0	0	0	0	4	0	0
6	11	FW	(Senegal) Nicolas Jackson	2	0	0	0	0	0	0	0	0	1	0	0	0	0	0	3	0	0
7	39	FW	(England) Brian Madjo	1	0	0	0	0	0	1	0	0	0	0	0	0	0	0	2	0	0
7	47	FW	(Brazil) Alysson	2	0	0	0	0	0	0	0	0	0	0	0	0	0	0	2	0	0
9	1	GK	(Japan) Zion Suzuki	1	0	0	0	0	0	0	0	0	0	0	0	0	0	0	1	0	0
9	5	DF	(England) Tyrone Mings	1	0	0	0	0	0	0	0	0	0	0	0	0	0	0	1	0	0
9	6	MF	(England) Ross Barkley	0	0	0	0	0	0	1	0	0	0	0	0	0	0	0	1	0	0
9	14	DF	(Spain) Pau Torres	0	0	0	0	0	0	0	0	0	0	0	0	1	0	0	1	0	0
9	27	MF	(Germany) Leon Goretzka	1	0	0	0	0	0	0	0	0	0	0	0	0	0	0	1	0	0
9	29	DF	(Democratic Republic of the Congo) Aaron Wan-Bissaka	0	0	0	0	0	0	1	0	0	0	0	0	0	0	0	1	0	0
9	44	MF	(Switzerland) Johan Manzambi	1	0	0	0	0	0	0	0	0	0	0	0	0	0	0	1	0	0
Totals				22	0	1	0	0	0	6	0	0	6	0	0	3	0	0	37	0	1

== Awards ==
=== Club awards ===
==== Player of the Month award ====
Voted for by fans on Aston Villa's official website.

Month	Player	Ref.
August	Not awarded	
September	(Japan) Zion Suzuki	
October	(Senegal) Nicolas Jackson	
November		
December		
January		
February		
March		
April		
May		

==== Goal of the Month award ====
Voted for by fans on Aston Villa's WhatsApp account.

Month	Player	Competition	Opponent	Ref.
August	Not awarded			
September	(Argentina) Emiliano Buendía	Premier League	Tottenham Hotspur	
October	Not awarded			
November				
December				
January				
February				
March				
April				
May				

=== Player awards ===
==== Premier League Player of the Month ====
Month	Pos.	Player	Result	Ref.
October	FW	(Senegal) Nicolas Jackson	Won	

==== Premier League Goal of the Month ====
Month	Pos.	Player	Opposition	Result	Ref.
September	MF	(Argentina) Emiliano Buendía	v. Tottenham Hotspur	Nominated	
September	FW	(Senegal) Nicolas Jackson	v. Tottenham Hotspur	Nominated	

==== Premier League Save of the Month ====
Month	Pos.	Player	Opposition	Result	Ref.
October	GK	(Japan) Zion Suzuki	v. Fulham	Nominated	

=== Manager awards ===
==== Premier League Manager of the Month ====
Month	Manager	Result	Ref.
October	(Spain) Unai Emery	Nominated	
