= Madjo =

Madjo is a Cameroonian surname. Notable people with the surname include:

- Brian Madjo (born 2009), English footballer
- Guy Madjo (born 1984), Cameroonian footballer
