= 2026 UEFA Super Cup =

European football match

- Match programme cover
Paris Saint-Germain	Aston Villa
(France)	(England)
2	1
- Date: 12 August 2026
- Venue: Red Bull Arena, Salzburg
- Man of the Match: Désiré Doué (Paris Saint-Germain)
- Referee: Omar Artan (Somalia)
- Attendance: 27,681
- Weather: Clear night 23 °C (73 °F); 48% humidity

The 2026 UEFA Super Cup was the 51st edition of the UEFA Super Cup, an annual football match organised by UEFA and contested by the reigning champions of the top two European club competitions, the UEFA Champions League and the UEFA Europa League. The match featured French club Paris Saint-Germain, the winners of the 2025–26 UEFA Champions League and reigning UEFA Super Cup title holders, and English club Aston Villa, the winners of the 2025–26 UEFA Europa League. It was played at the Red Bull Arena in Salzburg, Austria, on 12 August 2026.

Paris Saint-Germain won the match 2–1 for their second UEFA Super Cup title.

== Teams ==
Team	Qualification	Previous participations (bold indicates winners)
(France) Paris Saint-Germain	Winners of the 2025–26 UEFA Champions League	2 (1996, **2025**)
(England) Aston Villa	Winners of the 2025–26 UEFA Europa League	1 (**1982**)

== Venue ==
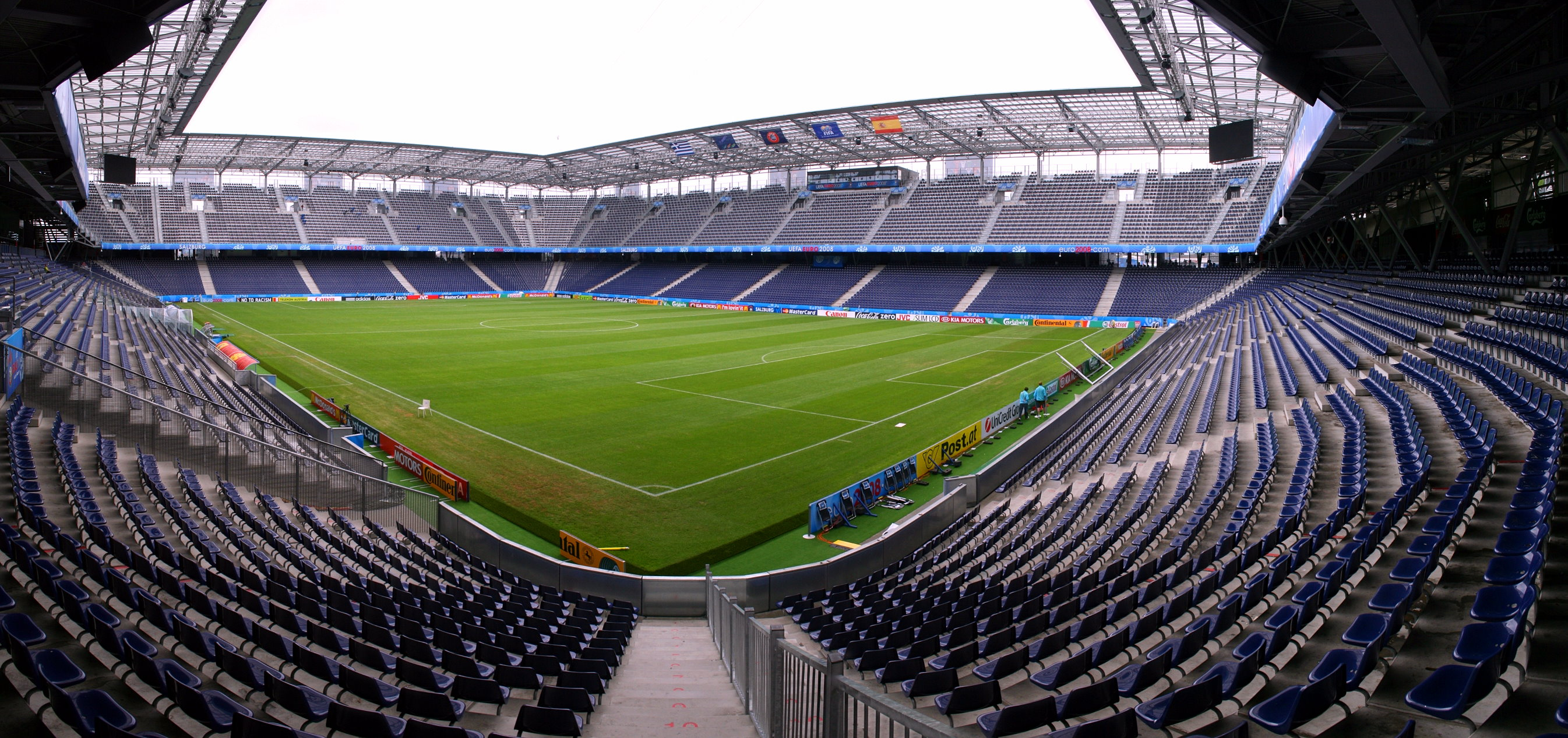
The Red Bull Arena in Salzburg hosted the match.

It was the first UEFA Super Cup to be held in Austria, and the first major European final to be played in Salzburg. It was the seventh major European club final to be played in Austria, after four in the European Cup/Champions League (1964, 1987, 1990, 1995), one in the Cup Winners' Cup (1970) and one in the UEFA Cup (1994 first leg), all of which were held at the Ernst-Happel-Stadion in Vienna. The Red Bull Arena is the home stadium of Red Bull Salzburg, and has a capacity of 30,071. The venue opened in 2003, and hosted three group stage matches at UEFA Euro 2008. It was known as Stadion Salzburg in UEFA communications due to their restrictions on third-party sponsorship.

=== Host selection ===
The Red Bull Arena was selected as the host by the UEFA Executive Committee during their meeting in Tirana, Albania, on 11 September 2025.

== Pre-match ==
After being denied entry to the United States to officiate at the 2026 FIFA World Cup, Somali referee Omar Artan was appointed as the lead official for the 2026 UEFA Super Cup on 11 June 2026, becoming the first ever non-European to officiate the match. The appointment was made within the framework of a Memorandum of Understanding (MoU) between UEFA and the Confederation of African Football (CAF), signed on the sidelines of the 76th FIFA Congress in Vancouver, Canada in April 2026.

=== Dignitaries in attendance ===
Other officials who attended the match included UEFA President Aleksander Čeferin and General Secretary Theodore Theodoridis, CAF President Patrice Motsepe, Paris Saint-Germain FC President Nasser Al-Khelaifi, Austrian Football Association (ÖFB) President Josef Pröll representing the host nation, and Rwandan President Paul Kagame, whose country's "Visit Rwanda" tourism campaign sponsors both teams. This match marked Čeferin’s first public appearance since his boycott of the 2026 FIFA World Cup final match between Spain and Argentina, an action prompted by the Balogun red card controversy.

== Match ==
=== Summary ===
In the 20th minute, Khvicha Kvaratskhelia gave Paris Saint-Germain the lead when he received the ball on the left from Désiré Doué before cutting into the penalty area and shooting right footed to the left of the net. It was 1–1 in the 45th minute when Brian Madjo finished high to the net from six yards out with a side-footed volley after a cross from John McGinn from the right. This goal made him the youngest player ever to score at the UEFA Super Cup, at 17 years and 212 days.

In the 60th minute, Désiré Doué scored to make it 2–1 to Paris Saint-Germain when he received a pass on the right from substitute Ousmane Dembélé before cutting in on his left foot before shooting into the left of the net from the right edge of the six yard box. After a VAR check for offside, the goal was awarded.

Following this result, Paris Saint-Germain became the fourth club (after Ajax, AC Milan, and Real Madrid) to win the UEFA Super Cup in consecutive seasons.

=== Details ===
The Champions League winners were designated as the "home" team for administrative purposes.

12 August 2026
21:00 UTC+2

Paris Saint-Germain (France)	2–1	(England) Aston Villa
Kvaratskhelia 20'; Doué 61'	Report	Madjo 45'

Red Bull Arena, Salzburg
Attendance: 27,681
Referee: Omar Artan (Somalia)

**Paris Saint-Germain**	**Aston Villa**

GK	39	(Russia) Matvey Safonov
RB	2	(Morocco) Achraf Hakimi
CB	5	(Brazil) Marquinhos (c)
CB	51	(Ecuador) Willian Pacho
LB	25	(Portugal) Nuno Mendes	(substituted off) 74'
CM	87	(Portugal) João Neves	(substituted off) 75'
CM	17	(Portugal) Vitinha
CM	33	(France) Warren Zaïre-Emery
RF	11	(France) Maghnes Akliouche	(substituted off) 46'
CF	14	(France) Désiré Doué	(substituted off) 87'
LF	7	(Georgia (country)) Khvicha Kvaratskhelia	(substituted off) 88'
Substitutes:
GK	30	(France) Lucas Chevalier
DF	4	(Brazil) Lucas Beraldo	(substituted on) 88'
DF	6	(Ukraine) Illia Zabarnyi
DF	12	(France) Lucas Digne
DF	21	(France) Lucas Hernandez	(substituted on) 74'
MF	8	(Spain) Fabián Ruiz	(substituted on) 75'
MF	24	(France) Senny Mayulu	(substituted on) 87'
MF	27	(Spain) Dro Fernández
FW	10	(France) Ousmane Dembélé	(substituted on) 46'
FW	29	(France) Bradley Barcola
FW	47	(France) Quentin Ndjantou
FW	49	(Senegal) Ibrahim Mbaye
Manager:
(Spain) Luis Enrique

GK	40	(Netherlands) Marco Bizot
RB	2	(Poland) Matty Cash
CB	3	(Sweden) Victor Lindelöf
CB	14	(Spain) Pau Torres	(yellow card) 51'	(substituted off) 80'
LB	22	(Netherlands) Ian Maatsen
RM	7	(Scotland) John McGinn (c)	(yellow card) 72'	(substituted off) 72'
CM	35	(Brazil) João Gomes	(yellow card) 64'	(substituted off) 80'
CM	8	(France) Boubacar Kamara		(substituted off) 72'
LM	53	(England) George Hemmings
CF	10	(Argentina) Emiliano Buendía
CF	39	(England) Brian Madjo		(substituted off) 72'
Substitutes:
GK	42	(England) James Wright
GK	60	(England) Owen Asemota
DF	5	(England) Tyrone Mings		(substituted on) 80'
DF	32	(Serbia) Kosta Nedeljković
DF	45	(England) Triston Rowe
DF	48	(Senegal) Modou Kéba Cissé
MF	6	(England) Ross Barkley		(substituted on) 80'
MF	26	(Netherlands) Lamare Bogarde		(substituted on) 72'
MF	49	(England) Bradley Burrowes
FW	18	(England) Tammy Abraham		(substituted on) 72'
FW	47	(Brazil) Alysson		(substituted on) 72'
FW	74	(England) Luka Lynch
Manager:
(Spain) Unai Emery

Man of the Match:
Désiré Doué (Paris Saint-Germain)

Assistant referees:
Liban Abdoulrazack Ahmed (Djibouti)
Stephen Eleazar Onyango Yiembe (Kenya)
Fourth official:
Rade Obrenović (Slovenia)
Video assistant referee:
Marco Di Bello (Italy)
Assistant video assistant referee:
Guillermo Cuadra Fernández (Spain)

**Match rules**

- 90 minutes
- Penalty shoot-out if scores level
- Maximum of twelve named substitutes
- Maximum of five substitutions
- Maximum of three substitution opportunities

=== Statistics ===
First half
Statistic	Paris Saint-Germain	Aston Villa
Goals scored	1	1
Total shots	6	10
Shots on target	2	2
Saves	1	1
Ball possession	60%	40%
Corner kicks	0	2
Fouls committed	6	5
Offsides	1	0
Yellow cards	0	0
Red cards	0	0

Second half
Statistic	Paris Saint-Germain	Aston Villa
Goals scored	1	0
Total shots	5	5
Shots on target	3	2
Saves	2	2
Ball possession	53%	47%
Corner kicks	0	0
Fouls committed	5	8
Offsides	1	0
Yellow cards	0	3
Red cards	0	0

Overall
Statistic	Paris Saint-Germain	Aston Villa
Goals scored	2	1
Total shots	11	15
Shots on target	5	4
Saves	3	3
Ball possession	56%	44%
Corner kicks	0	2
Fouls committed	11	13
Offsides	2	0
Yellow cards	0	3
Red cards	0	0

== See also ==
- 2026 UEFA Champions League final
- 2026 UEFA Europa League final
- 2026 UEFA Conference League final
- 2026 UEFA Women's Champions League final
- 2026 UEFA Women's Europa Cup final
