= Brian Madjo =

English footballer (born 2009)

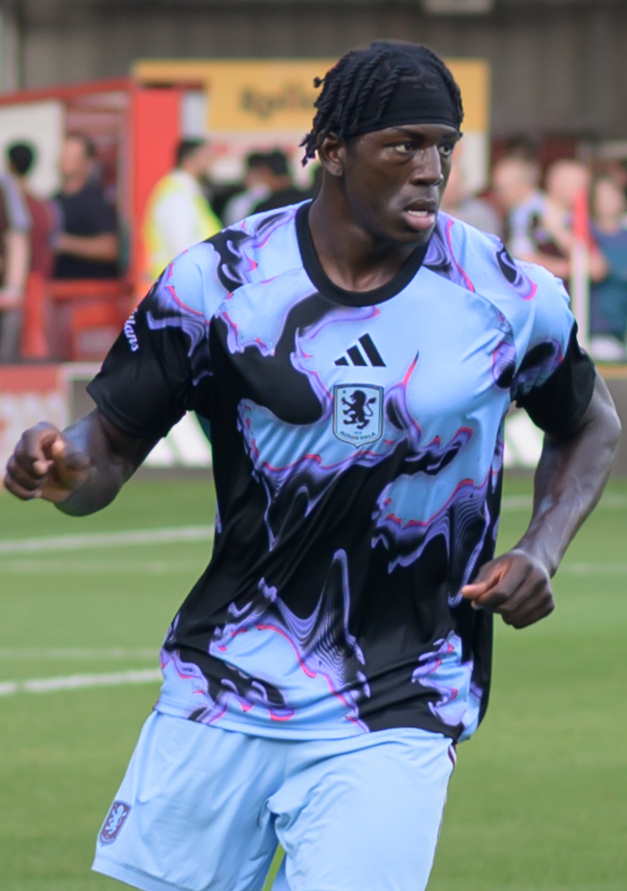
- Madjo with Aston Villa in 2026

Personal information
- Full name: Brian Djomeni Madjo
- Date of birth: 12 January 2009 (age 17)
- Place of birth: Enfield, England
- Height: 1.93 m (6 ft 4 in)
- Position: Forward

Team information
- Current team: Aston Villa
- Number: 39

Youth career
- Marisca Mersch
- 2020–2023: Racing Union
- 2023–2025: Metz

Senior career*
Years	Team	Apps	(Gls)
2025–2026	Metz	5	(0)
2025	Metz B	2	(2)
2026–	Aston Villa	3	(0)

International career^{‡}
2023	Luxembourg U15		
2024	Luxembourg U16	5	(2)
2025	Luxembourg	3	(0)
2025–2026	England U17	9	(4)
2026–	England U20	2	(1)
- * Club domestic league appearances and goals as of 21:18, 21 November 2026 (UTC) ‡ National team caps and goals as of 18:24, 16 November 2026 (UTC)

Brian Djomeni Madjo (born 12 January 2009) is an English professional footballer who plays as a forward for Premier League club Aston Villa.

Madjo is a product of the Marisca Mersch and Racing Union academies in Luxembourg. He subsequently moved over the border to French side Metz's academy, where he appeared for both their B and senior sides in National 3 and Ligue 1 before transferring to Aston Villa in 2026.

Born in England and raised in Luxembourg, he initially represented the Luxembourg national team in both youth and senior international matches before switching to his birth nation, subsequently appearing for the England under-17s and later in 2026 the England U20 side, still aged only seventeen.

== Early life ==
Madjo was born on 12 January 2009 in Enfield, England and moved with his family to Boevange-sur-Attert, Luxembourg at the age of two. Born to Cameroonian parents, he is the son of Cameroonian footballer Guy Madjo, but was raised by his mother Blandine. He has a twin brother and two sisters; one of his sisters, Dionne, plays basketball for the San Diego State Aztecs and internationally for Luxembourg.

Madjo speaks English, German, Luxembourgish and French. He obtained Luxembourgish citizenship in March 2025.

== Club career ==
=== Early career ===
As a youth player, Madjo joined the youth academy of Luxembourgish side Marisca Mersch. Subsequently, he joined the youth academy of Luxembourgish side Racing Union in 2020. In 2023, he joined the youth academy of French Ligue 1 side Metz. Following an impressive season with Metz's under‑19 side, he signed his first professional contract with the club in July 2025, which ran until June 2028.

Madjo made his professional debut on 17 August 2025, starting and playing 58 minutes in a 0–1 loss against Strasbourg. Hence, he became the club's youngest debutant, aged 16 years and 217 days, breaking previous record of Bernard Zénier in August 1974. He later featured in two matches for Metz's B team in the Championnat National 3, scoring twice in a match against Neuilly-sur-Marne in November.

=== Aston Villa ===
On 12 January 2026, Madjo signed for Premier League club Aston Villa for an undisclosed fee, reported to be up to €12 million.

In March 2026, it was revealed that Aston Villa were in dispute with FIFA which had prevented them from registering Madjo as a player, meaning that he could not feature for their first or youth teams in competitive matches. The disagreement stemmed from FIFA characterising the transfer as an international transfer, due to Madjo's appearances for the Luxembourg national team, whereas Aston Villa considered him English due to being born in London. An international transfer cannot take place until a player is 18 years old, which would mean Madjo would not be able to be registered until January 2027.

In early July 2026, Aston Villa escalated the fight to register Madjo to the Court of Arbitration for Sport, hoping for a ruling to be made in their favour before the deadline for UEFA Champions League squad registration on 2 September. Eligible to play in friendly matches during this time, Madjo made his debut as a substitute in a mid-season match against Elche CF in March 2026. On 21 July 2026, Madjo featured again in a friendly match against Walsall in which he started and scored a brace. On 4 August 2026, Aston Villa's appeal was upheld, and Madjo was deemed eligible to play in competitive matches. In his first competitive match, the 2026 UEFA Super Cup against Paris Saint-Germain, Madjo scored a 45th-minute equaliser in an eventual 2–1 defeat. This goal made him the youngest player ever to score at the UEFA Super Cup, at 17 years and 212 days, surpassing Patrick Kluivert, at 19 years and 220 days.

On 24 October 2026, Madjo made his Premier League debut as a late substitute to see out a 2–1 home victory over Manchester City.

== International career ==
After initially representing Luxembourg and earning three caps at senior international level for them during the first half of 2025, Madjo accepted his first call-up to the England under-17 squad in August 2025. The following week, he scored on his debut in a victory over Venezuela U17. He made his England U20 debut against Czechia U20 in the Under 20 Elite League, aged seventeen, on 12 November 2026, entering the field as a substitute. He provided an assist for Villa team-mate Ben Broggio in stoppage time. Madjo scored his first goal in his second appearance for England U20, in a 2–1 victory over Portugal.

== Style of play ==
Madjo plays as a forward. Luxembourgish news website Virgule wrote in 2025 that he is a "1.93m tall guy, built like a rock, athletic and technically interesting". Right-footed, he has received comparisons to Belgium international Romelu Lukaku.

== Career statistics ==
=== Club ===
As of match played 21 November 2026

Appearances and goals by club, season and competition
Club	Season	League			National cup (Note: Includes Coupe de France, FA Cup)		League cup (Note: Includes EFL Cup)		Europe		Other		Total	
Club	Season	Division	Apps	Goals	Apps	Goals	Apps	Goals	Apps	Goals	Apps	Goals	Apps	Goals
Metz B	2025–26	National 3 Group E	2	2	–		—		—		—		2	2
Metz	2025–26	Ligue 1	5	0	0	0	—		—		—		5	0
Aston Villa	2025–26	Premier League	0	0	0	0	0	0	0	0	—		0	0
Aston Villa	2026–27	Premier League	3	0	0	0	1	0	0	0	1 (Note: Appearance in UEFA Super Cup)	1	5	1
Aston Villa	Total		3	0	0	0	1	0	0	0	1	1	5	1
Career total			10	2	0	0	1	0	0	0	1	1	12	3

=== International ===
As of match played 6 June 2025

Appearances and goals by national team and year
National team	Year	Apps	Goals
Luxembourg	2025	3	0
Total		3	0
