= 2026 FIFA World Cup immigration and visa controversies =

The 2026 FIFA World Cup was accompanied by several controversies, including immigration and visa issues across its three host nations—the United States, Mexico, and Canada. It has been described as the most controversial World Cup.

== Immigration policy in the United States and Canada ==
Another controversy, similar to when the events were hosted in Russia and Qatar, involved host country immigration policies. Specifically, during the 2026 FIFA World Cup, the United States immigration and visa policies under the second Trump administration, which affected players, officials, journalists, and fans from several qualified nations. A travel ban affecting citizens of 39 countries—including World Cup participants Haiti, Iran, Ivory Coast, and Senegal—prevented most ordinary fans from those countries from obtaining visas to attend matches in the United States, though exemptions were granted for athletes, coaches, and essential support staff, as well as dual citizens, permanent residents, and valid visa holders. A separate visa bond program initially required fans from five African nations to pay deposits of up to $15,000, a requirement that was temporarily suspended in May 2026 for ticketed fans. Iraqi striker Aymen Hussein was detained for seven hours upon arrival at O'Hare International Airport, while Somali referee Omar Artan was denied entry and was unable to officiate at the tournament.

The participation of the Iran national team became complicated when the United States and Israel attacked Iran on February 28, 2026. Iran's training base was relocated from Tucson, Arizona, to Tijuana, Mexico, and the team's ticket allocation was revoked days before the tournament began. Portions of Iran's coaching and administrative staff were denied visas, and Iranian authorities threatened to withdraw the team on multiple occasions before ultimately confirming participation. During the bidding process, President Donald Trump's executive orders regarding immigration from certain Muslim-majority countries in 2017, implemented during his first term, were touted as a potential risk. Infantino stated, "any team, including the supporters and officials of that team, who qualify for a World Cup need to have access to the country, otherwise there is no World Cup." In response, the Trump administration sent letters to FIFA stating, in part, that Trump was "confident" that "all eligible athletes, officials and fans from all countries around the world would be able to enter the United States without discrimination."

Concerns around the staging of the tournament were also raised during the first meeting of the FIFA World Cup Task Force due to the immigration policy of the second Donald Trump administration. In response, Vice President JD Vance said, "Of course, everybody is welcome to come and see this incredible event, but when the time is up, they'll have to go home. Otherwise, they'll have to talk to Secretary Noem." On June 11, 2025, the Sports & Rights Alliance, Human Rights Watch, and Amnesty International called on FIFA to ensure that human rights in the United States were upheld during the tournament, especially in light of the use of force during the anti-ICE protests in Los Angeles, where journalists and protesters were attacked by local police. Following the killings of civilians Renée Good and Alex Pretti by federal agents during immigration enforcement operations in the Minneapolis–Saint Paul area in January 2026, fan group Football Supporters Europe stated that it was "extremely concerned by the ongoing militarisation of police forces in the US."

=== 2025 travel ban and exemptions ===
In June 2025, the second Trump administration reinstated a travel ban affecting citizens from multiple countries, citing national security concerns. The ban, which was later expanded in December, prohibited the issuance of new immigrant and non-immigrant visas for citizens of 39 affected countries, including those whose teams had qualified for the World Cup: Haiti, Iran, Ivory Coast, and Senegal. The proclamation included an exemption for any athlete or member of an athletic team, including coaches, persons performing a necessary support role, and immediate relatives, traveling for the World Cup, Olympics, or other major sporting events as determined by the Secretary of State.

This exemption ensured that national teams' players, coaches, and staff from those designated countries would be permitted to enter the United States for the competition, but the U.S. State Department confirmed that ordinary citizens of the four countries were not covered by this exemption, making them ineligible for visa issuance to attend the matches. While fans were permitted to submit visa applications with the promise of priority if they provided proof of tickets, the department noted that issuance would be unlikely, barring rare "national interest" waivers. However, this restriction could be circumvented if a fan was a valid visa holder, a permanent resident, or a dual national who applied using a passport not subject to the ban. In such cases, applicants could still be eligible to enter or apply for entry, provided they satisfied all other immigration and security requirements.

=== Visa bond program ===
Aside from the travel ban, the Trump administration also introduced a "visa bond" policy in August 2025 targeting nationals from countries with high overstay rates, inadequate screening and vetting information, or those that offered citizenship by investment programs, whereby applicants could obtain citizenship without a residency requirement. The qualified teams affected under this policy were Algeria, Cape Verde, Ivory Coast, Senegal, and Tunisia, requiring aspiring fans to pay a deposit of up to $15,000 in order to secure a B-1/B-2 visitor visa needed to attend World Cup matches in the United States. Unlike the travel ban, it was unclear whether the policy would apply to national team players, coaches, and staff from the designated countries, but The New York Times reported that FIFA was seeking exemptions for players from those nations on the list. In May 2026, the U.S. government decided to temporarily drop the $15,000 visa bond requirement, as long as fans had a valid ticket for the tournament. At the same time, the U.S. banned fans from Iran and Haiti from traveling to the World Cup with limited exceptions (dual citizens, permanent residents, and valid visa holders); players, coaches, and support staff from those two countries were not affected by the ban.

=== Visa denials, entry restrictions, and border enforcement ===
In April 2026, Iranian Football Federation president Mehdi Taj was denied entry to Canada due reportedly to his past affiliation with the Islamic Revolutionary Guard Corps, which is listed as a terrorist organization in the country since June 2024.

In June 2026, Iranian players were ultimately granted visas to enter the United States, but a substantial portion of coaching, managerial, and support staff were reportedly denied entry permits, prompting accusations from Iranian officials of discriminatory and politically motivated treatment. Reports indicated that the team was only permitted to enter the United States on match days, further complicating logistical planning and training arrangements. Iranian authorities and soccer officials argued that such measures undermined the principle of equal participation and contravened the obligations of a World Cup host nation, while U.S. officials maintained that security-related screening procedures were necessary and targeted individuals with alleged links to non-sporting or sanctioned entities. As of June 14, ten Iranian delegation members re-submitted the U.S. visa applications after arriving in Mexico, while only four members were approved.

On June 2, Swiss striker Breel Embolo was initially denied entry to the United States due to a 2023 conviction for making threats, for which he received a suspended fine. He was later granted entry clearance and remained eligible to participate in the tournament. On June 5, Iraqi striker Aymen Hussein was detained and questioned for seven hours upon arriving in the United States through Chicago's O'Hare International Airport, where, according to an Iraqi Olympic Committee official, U.S. authorities inspected his phone before permitting his entry into the country. Meanwhile, the team's photographer, Talal Salah, was detained for more than ten hours and ultimately denied entry into the United States.

On June 6, Somali referee Omar Artan, who had been selected to officiate at the World Cup, was denied entry into the United States upon arrival at Miami International Airport despite holding a valid U.S. visa and a diplomatic passport issued with the assistance of the Somali Embassy in Nairobi. He was subsequently placed on a return flight to Istanbul, from where he had traveled to attend a mandatory FIFA seminar for match officials ahead of the tournament. United States Customs and Border Protection stated that Artan was found inadmissible following inspection due to "vetting concerns" and alleged "association with suspected members of terror organizations". Artan strongly denied any links to terror groups. Upon his return to Somalia on June 10, it was announced that Artan would still receive his full World Cup salary of $100,000 from FIFA, followed by a UEFA announcement the next day confirming he would officiate the upcoming UEFA Super Cup in August, becoming the first ever non-European to officiate the match. Additionally, according to reports, Jibril Rajoub, president of the Palestinian Football Association, was denied a U.S. visa, preventing him from traveling to the country to attend World Cup-related events. According to the Associated Press, Rajoub stated that he was waiting in Mexico City for permission to enter the United States.

On June 11, Julien Kouadio Adonis, president of the National Committee of Elephants Supporters (CNSE) of Ivory Coast, told Agence France-Presse (AFP) that the United States government had denied visas to Ivory Coast-based fans who wished to attend the World Cup. According to Adonis, U.S. officials explicitly stated that they did not want supporters from certain countries, including Ivory Coast and Senegal, on American soil. As a result, the Ivorian and Senegalese fans canceled their travel plans. Only a handful of CNSE officials were authorized to travel, and their role was limited to supporting members of the respective communities already residing in the United States.

On June 12, the Government of Canada denied a visa and entry into the country to Ghanaian player Thomas Partey, resulting in his absence from Ghana's opening match against Panama. The decision was reportedly linked to criminal charges brought in Britain against Partey, who was accused of five counts of rape and one count of sexual assault in July 2025, as well as additional rape charges filed in February 2026. In response, FIFA stated: "FIFA is not involved in the immigration processes of host countries, including the adjudication of visas. As with previous FIFA events, the host government ultimately determines who receives a visa and is admitted into the country".

On June 13, the Ghanaian government protested Canada's denial of the visa to Partey while saying there was lack of judicial decisions regarding the charges. On June 17, a Canadian federal judge rejected Partey's emergency appeal against the visa denial, ruling that there were insufficient grounds to overturn the immigration authorities' decision. The ruling confirmed his ineligibility to enter Canada and his absence from Ghana's opening match against Panama in Toronto, which Ghana won 1–0. On June 21, after receiving permission to enter the United States, Partey was named in Ghana's squad for their group stage match against England in Boston. After making his World Cup debut starting in a 1–0 win over Ecuador in Philadelphia, Ivorian player Elye Wahi was initially refused entry to Canada for the second match against Germany due to concerns relating to alleged involvement in a spot-fixing scandal earlier that year, before later being granted permission to travel after officials confirmed he met the entry requirements.

=== Immigration enforcement in host cities ===
In April 2026, Homeland Security Secretary Markwayne Mullin said that customs officials could stop processing international travelers at airports in U.S. sanctuary cities that declined to cooperate with the administration's immigration enforcement. In late May, Mullin confirmed that the department was drawing up such plans. Seven of the eleven United States host cities, including Boston, Los Angeles, New York/New Jersey, Philadelphia, Seattle, and the San Francisco Bay Area, were sanctuary jurisdictions that could have been affected. Airlines for America warned the proposal would have a "devastating effect" on the airline and tourism industries, leading to speculation the timing of that new rule had been postponed until after the tournament.

In May 2026, NBC News reported that ICE personnel may be present at World Cup matches and that the agency had issued no internal guidance prohibiting immigration arrests at stadiums. Workers at SoFi Stadium protested in May over a potential ICE deployment at matches (§ Labor disputes). On June 1, Los Angeles County Sheriff Robert Luna said federal officials had told him that civil immigration enforcement would not take place at World Cup games or events in Los Angeles, while noting the assurance was "subject to change".

== Canadian visa applications ==
On June 24, 2026, CTV News reported that more than half of "all World Cup visitor applications" were denied by the Canadian government. According to Immigration, Refugees and Citizenship Canada (IRCC), the most applications came from Ghana. At least 1,725 visitor visa applications from Ghanaian soccer fans were processed by Canada, and only under 11% of these were approved.
