= George Hemmings =

English association football player (born 2007)

- Hemmings with Aston Villa in 2026

Personal information
- Full name: George Lawrence Hemmings
- Date of birth: 4 March 2007 (age 19)
- Place of birth: Derby, England
- Positions: Midfielder; winger

Team information
- Current team: Aston Villa
- Number: 53

Youth career
- –2024: Nottingham Forest
- 2024–2025: Aston Villa

Senior career*
| Years | Team | Apps | (Gls) |
| 2025– | Aston Villa | 8 | (0) |

International career^{‡}
| 2022 | England U16 | 4 | (0) |
| 2024–2025 | England U18 | 5 | (0) |
| 2026– | England U19 | 2 | (0) |
| 2026– | England U20 | 2 | (0) |
- * Club domestic league appearances and goals as of 19:41 (UTC), 8 November 2026 ‡ National team caps and goals as of 11:15, 17 November 2026 (UTC)

George Lawrence Hemmings (born 4 March 2007) is an English professional footballer who plays for Premier League club Aston Villa as a midfielder or winger.

Hemmings is a product of the Aston Villa and Nottingham Forest academies and has played regularly for England at youth level, currently with the under-19 side.

== Club career ==
A central midfielder as a youth player, Hemmings was a member of the Nottingham Forest youth system for whom he featured for their under-21 side, prior to joining Aston Villa in January 2024. Initially joining up with the Aston Villa under-18 team. He signed a professional contact with Aston Villa in April 2024, and a new long-term contract with the club in May 2025. That month, he played as Aston Villa U18 defeated Man City U18 3–1 to win the FA Youth Cup.

Hemmings was named amongst the Aston Villa match day substitutes in their Premier League match against Leeds United on 23 November 2025, and in the UEFA Europa League against FC Basel on 1 December 2025.

On 30 December 2025, Hemmings made his Premier League debut for Aston Villa during the 4–1 loss against Arsenal as a second-half substitute.

Hemmings made his first senior start for Aston Villa against Red Bull Salzburg in the last league phase game of the UEFA Europa League, a competition the club won that season. With the team qualified for the UEFA Champions League, Hemmings made his debut in the competition on 8 September 2026, starting in a 3–2 away win against Club Brugge. He was the first teenager to start for Aston Villa in Europe's premier club competition (Champions League/European Cup) for 43 years.

On 17 November 2026, Hemmings signed a new contract with Aston Villa. It was reported to be a 5-year contract, with the option of an extra year.

== International career ==
In November 2024, Hemmings was called up for an England U18 squad for a series of friendlies in Valencia, having previously represented the England U16s. He went onto make his debut in a 3–1 defeat to Poland on 15 November.

On 28 March 2026, Hemmings made his England U19 debut during a 1–0 2026 UEFA European Under-19 Championship qualification win over Poland.

On 18 September 2026, Hemmings was called up for England U20 squad for the upcoming Under 20 Elite League matches against Italy and Germany. However, a few days later, Hemmings withdrew from the squad. Hemmings went on to make his England U20 debut on 12 November 2026, starting a 6–1 victory over Czech Republic.

== Style of play ==
Hemmings has been described as a highly technical midfield player, capable of playing box-to-box, or as a sitting midfield player. In 2026, it was reported that Villa coaches saw Hemmings as a left-sided "number 10", similar to former Villa player Jacob Ramsey.

== Career statistics ==
As of match played 8 November 2026

Appearances and goals by club, season and competition
| Club | Season | League | | | National cup | | League cup | | Europe | | Other | | Total | |
| Club | Season | Division | Apps | Goals | Apps | Goals | Apps | Goals | Apps | Goals | Apps | Goals | Apps | Goals |
|---|---|---|---|---|---|---|---|---|---|---|---|---|---|---|
| Aston Villa U21s | 2024–25 | — | | | | | | | | | 2 (Note: Appearance(s) in EFL Trophy) | 0 | 2 | 0 |
| Aston Villa U21s | 2025–26 | — | | | | | | | | | 1 | 0 | 1 | 0 |
| Aston Villa U21s | Total | | — | | | | | | | | 3 | 0 | 3 | 0 |
| Aston Villa | 2025–26 | Premier League | 2 | 0 | 0 | 0 | 0 | 0 | 2 (Note: Appearances in UEFA Europa League) | 0 | — | | 4 | 0 |
| Aston Villa | 2026–27 | Premier League | 6 | 0 | 0 | 0 | 2 | 0 | 2 (Note: Appearances in UEFA Champions League) | 0 | 1 (Note: Appearance in UEFA Super Cup) | 0 | 11 | 0 |
| Aston Villa | Total | | 8 | 0 | 0 | 0 | 2 | 0 | 4 | 0 | 1 | 0 | 15 | 0 |
| Career total | | | 8 | 0 | 0 | 0 | 2 | 0 | 4 | 0 | 4 | 0 | 18 | 0 |

== Honours ==
Aston Villa

- UEFA Europa League: 2025–26

Aston Villa U18s

- FA Youth Cup: 2024–25
