= Alysson (footballer, born 2006) =

Brazilian footballer (born 2006)

Personal information
- Full name: Alysson Edward Franco da Rocha dos Santos
- Date of birth: 5 May 2006 (age 20)
- Place of birth: Apucarana, Brazil
- Height: 1.82 m (6 ft 0 in)
- Position: Winger

Team information
- Current team: Aston Villa
- Number: 47

Youth career
- 2018–2025: Grêmio

Senior career*
Years	Team	Apps	(Gls)
2024–2026	Grêmio	34	(1)
2026–	Aston Villa	10	(2)

International career
2022	Brazil U16	3	(3)
- * Club domestic league appearances and goals as of 21:20, 21 November 2026 (UTC)

Alysson Edward Franco da Rocha dos Santos (born 5 May 2006), known as Alysson, is a Brazilian professional footballer who plays as a right winger for Premier League club Aston Villa. A product of the Grêmio academy, he has appeared for Brazil at under-16 level.

== Club career ==
=== Grêmio ===
As a child, Alysson played football for local team Massareto Project Football. Alysson joined Grêmio's youth setup in 2015, aged 9. On 10 May 2022, he signed his first professional contract with the club, after agreeing to a three-year deal.

On 10 April 2024, Alysson renewed his contract with the Tricolor until 2028. He made his first team debut on 7 July, coming on as a second-half substitute for fellow youth graduate Gustavo Nunes in a 3–0 away loss to Juventude.

=== Aston Villa ===
On 1 January 2026, Alysson joined Premier League club Aston Villa for a reported fee of £8.7 million, with an additional £1.7 million in potential add-ons.

He made his debut for Aston Villa on 11 February 2026 during a 1–0 victory against Brighton & Hove Albion as a second-half substitute. He scored his first goal for Aston Villa in a 2–1 loss against Nottingham Forest, on 12 September 2026, then scored his first goal away from home in a 4-4 draw at Old Trafford, on 8 November 2026.

== International career ==
Alysson has played for Brazil at youth level, appearing three times for the under-16 side in 2022, scoring three times.

== Career statistics ==
As of match played 21 November 2026

Appearances and goals by club, season and competition
Club	Season	League			State league		National cup (Note: Includes Copa do Brasil, FA Cup)		League cup (Note: Includes EFL Cup)		Continental		Other		Total	
Club	Season	Division	Apps	Goals	Apps	Goals	Apps	Goals	Apps	Goals	Apps	Goals	Apps	Goals	Apps	Goals
Grêmio	2024	Série A	3	0	0	0	0	0	—		0	0	0	0	3	0
Grêmio	2025	Série A	31	1	0	0	2	0	—		5 (Note: Appearances in Copa Sudamericana)	0	1 (Note: Appearance in Recopa Gaúcha)	1	39	2
Grêmio	Total		34	1	0	0	2	0	—		5	0	1	1	42	2
Aston Villa	2025–26	Premier League	3	0	—		0	0	—		0	0	—		3	0
Aston Villa	2026–27	Premier League	10	2	—		0	0	2	0	4 (Note: Appearances in UEFA Champions League)	0	1 (Note: Appearance in UEFA Super Cup)	0	17	2
Aston Villa	Total		13	2	—		0	0	2	0	4	0	1	0	20	2
Career total			47	3	0	0	2	0	2	0	9	0	2	1	62	4

== Personal life ==
Born in Apucarana, Paraná, Alysson was raised by this mother Jessica and his father Magno. He has two younger sisters. Alysson enjoys video games, and has been described as a talented snooker player. As a child, his footballing idol was Brazilian international Neymar.

== Honours ==
Grêmio

- Recopa Gaúcha: 2025

Aston Villa

- UEFA Europa League: 2025–26
