= Red Bull Arena (Salzburg) =

Sports venue in Wals-Siezenheim, Austria

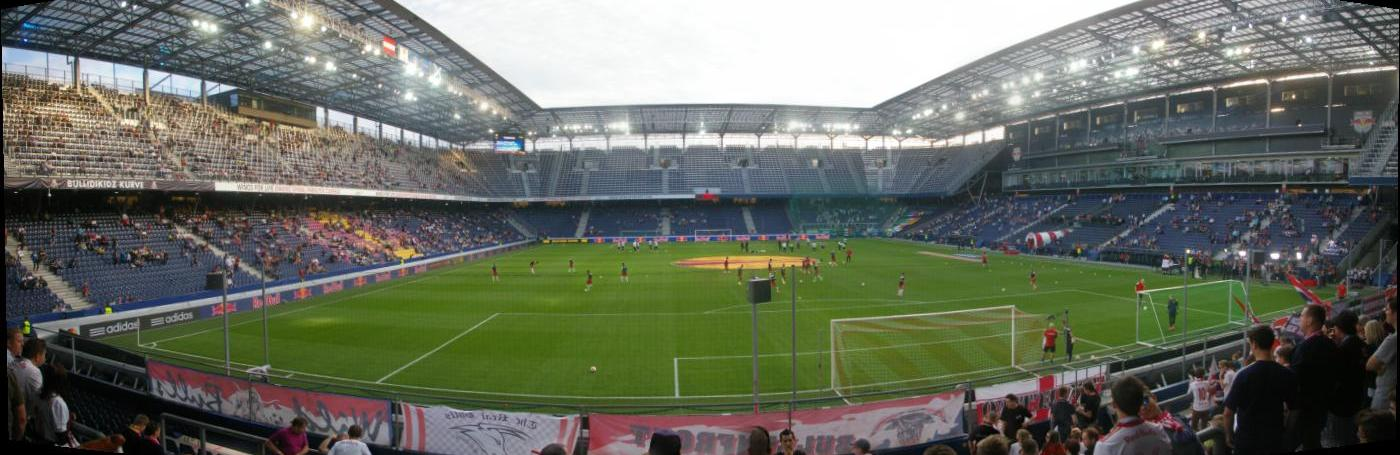
- Interior of the stadium in September 2014
- Interactive map of Red Bull Arena
- Former names: EM-Stadion Wals-Siezenheim, Bullen-Arena
- Location: Stadionstraße, Wals-Siezenheim, Austria
- Coordinates: 47.8163°N 12.9982°E
- Owner: SWS Stadion Salzburg Planungs- und Errichtungsgesellschaft m.b.H
- Capacity: 30,188 (17,218 Bundesliga) (29,520 UEFA matches) (31,895 UEFA Euro 2008)
- Surface: Lawn
- Field size: 105 m × 68 m (115 yd × 74 yd)

Construction
- Built: 2003
- Opened: 8 March 2003
- Renovated: Summer 2005; 6 May 2006 – 25 July 2007
- Cost: €45 million
- Architects: Schuster Architekten, Atelier Albert Wimmer

Tenants
- Red Bull Salzburg; FC Liefering; Austria national football team (selected matches)

Red Bull Arena (German: [ɹɛt ˈbʊl ʔaˌʁeːnaː]), known during the UEFA Euro 2008 as the EM-Stadion Wals-Siezenheim [eːˈʔɛmˌʃtaːdi̯ɔn ˌvalsˈsiːtsn̩haɪm] and during UEFA club football events as Stadion Salzburg, is a football stadium in Wals-Siezenheim, a municipality in the suburbs of Salzburg, Austria. It was officially opened in March 2003 and is the home ground of FC Red Bull Salzburg. Previously, the club played at Stadion Lehen.

== History ==
In 2011, the stadium hosted a friendly tournament known as the Salzburgerland Cup of four clubs. It features four teams - FK Austria Wien, FC Rapid București, Maccabi Haifa F.C. and FC Shakhtar Donetsk - with Shaktar being declared the champions.

== Overview ==
Its current seating capacity is 30,188. The stadium's original capacity was 18,200, but it was heavily expanded to over 30,000 to accommodate the 2008 European Football Championships.

The "EM Stadion Wals-Siezenheim" was the only stadium in the Austrian Bundesliga which used artificial turf. Polytan's FIFA 2-Star Recommended 40mm surface Ligaturf with a 25mm elastic layer was installed in 2005, but since summer 2008 natural lawn has been used.

From the 2018–19 Austrian Football Bundesliga season onwards, the majority of the upper stand remains closed, therefore limiting capacity to 17,218. This was done in order to improve the atmosphere, which was often considered as “weak“ during Salzburg‘s national home games. This reduction in capacity only applies for Bundesliga matches.

On 12 August 2026, the stadium hosted the 2026 UEFA Super Cup, with Somalia's Omar Artan becoming the first non-European referee to officiate the match. UEFA's Referees Committee appointed him on 11 June 2026, days after he was denied entry into the United States to officiate in the 2026 FIFA World Cup.

== Notable international association football matches ==
=== Euro 2008 matches ===
The stadium was one of the venues for the UEFA Euro 2008. Greece played all three games at the stadium during the tournament:

| Date | Team #1 | Result | Team #2 | Round | Attendance |
|---|---|---|---|---|---|
| 10 June 2008 | Greece | 0–2 | Sweden | Group D | 31,063 |
| 14 June 2008 | Greece | 0–1 | Russia | Group D | 31,063 |
| 18 June 2008 | Greece | 1–2 | Spain | Group D | 30,883 |

=== UEFA club competition finals ===
| Date | Winners | Result | Runners-up | Round |
|---|---|---|---|---|
| 12 August 2026 | (France) Paris Saint-Germain | 2–1 | (England) Aston Villa | 2026 UEFA Super Cup |

| Preceded by Stadio Friuli; Udine | UEFA Super Cup; Match venue 2026 | Succeeded by Johan Cruyff Arena; Amsterdam |
