= Omar Artan =

Somali football referee (born 1992)

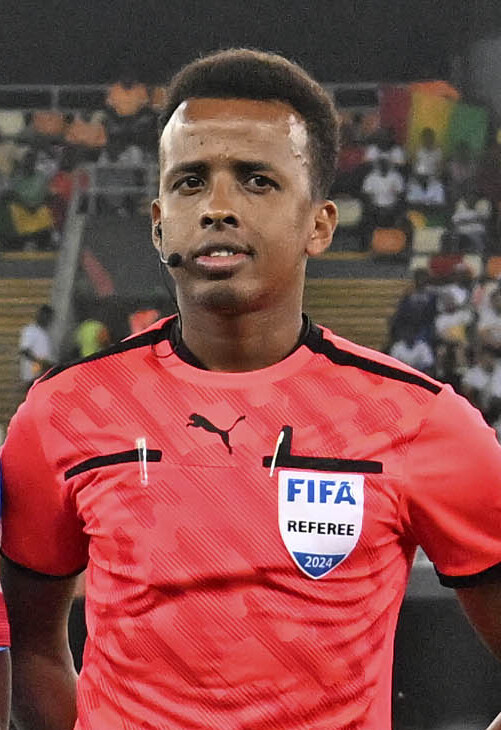
- Artan at the 2023 Africa Cup of Nations
- Born: 6 June 1992 (age 34); Mogadishu, Somalia

Domestic
Years	League	Role
2018–	Somali First Division	Referee

International
Years	League	Role
2018–	FIFA listed	Referee

Omar Abdulkadir Artan (Somali: Cumar Cabdulqaadir Cartan; Arabic: عمر عبد القادر عرتن; born 6 June 1992) is a Somali football referee who has been on the FIFA International Referees List since 2018.

Artan was the first referee from Somalia to take charge of a continental final, overseeing Egyptian side Pyramids FC's 2024–25 CAF Champions League triumph over South Africa's Mamelodi Sundowns in Cairo. He has also officiated at the Africa Cup of Nations (AFCON). He was the sole representative from Sub-Saharan Africa to officiate at the 2025 FIFA U-20 World Cup. Somali sporting authorities and media have described Artan's achievements as a source of pride and an inspiration for the country's sporting development.

He was the first Somali referee selected for a FIFA World Cup tournament, among three centre referees chosen from Africa. However, Artan was not allowed to enter the United States and was removed from the tournament, generating controversy. Shortly after, he was selected as the referee for the 2026 UEFA Super Cup, which took place on 12 August 2026.

== Early life ==
Omar Abdulkadir Artan was born in Mogadishu, Somalia on 6 June 1992.

== Refereeing career ==
Artan began his refereeing career in local Somali leagues and became an official referee in the Somali First Division. He has been a member of the FIFA-listed referees since 2018. Artan made history in January 2024 as the first Somali to officiate at the Africa Cup of Nations, overseeing the Group E match between Tunisia and Namibia. He has also handled high-profile fixtures in the CAF Champions League and 2026 FIFA World Cup qualifiers. Artan was a part of a nine-member contingent from Africa that includes three referees and six assistant referees selected.

Somalia's footballing landscape faced numerous challenges due to instability and conflict that plagued the country for decades. However, recent efforts to restore peace and security have created opportunities for football revival. FIFA played a pivotal role in this revival by offering training to Somali referees and young footballers. Training had been halted for many years due to the unstable situation in the country. However, with the security improvement, FIFA resumed its training programs.

=== 2026 FIFA World Cup ===
In April 2026, Artan was selected to referee the 2026 FIFA World Cup. Following the announcement, president Hassan Sheikh Mohamud applauded Artan for his "effort, skills, and integrity."

On 6 June, he flew from Istanbul, Turkey, to Miami over the weekend to attend a mandatory FIFA match officials seminar ahead of the World Cup. He had secured multiple three-month US entry visas and received a diplomatic passport facilitated by the Somali Embassy in Nairobi, but upon arrival at Miami International Airport, US Customs and Border Protection (CBP) denied him entry, immediately placing him on a return flight to Istanbul. CBP stated that Artan was found inadmissible following inspection due to unspecified "vetting concerns" and was therefore denied admission to the United States.

Some sources blamed the stringent vetting processes and tight immigration restrictions implemented by Trump administration. Artan later said that he had been subjected to an 11-hour immigration interview before being refused entry. He stated that US officials did not provide a clear explanation for the decision, despite his possessing the required travel documents, and suggested that his Somali nationality may have been a factor. Describing the World Cup as "the biggest dream of my life", he expressed disappointment at being unable to participate in the tournament. After his return to Somalia, Artan said that among the questions made by the US officials were topics related to Al-Qaeda and Al-Shabaab. An unnamed US official subsequently stated that Artan's alleged "association with suspected members of terror organizations" was the reason for refusing entry.

The entry denial was condemned by human rights advocates, critics, and Canadian political figures including Toronto Mayor Olivia Chow, whose city was co-hosting tournament matches. Chow criticized the decision, stating that "denying entry to Omar Artan, who has earned his place on the world stage through hard work and perseverance, is not right," while affirming that he would be welcome to officiate in Toronto.

FIFA confirmed that he would be unable to participate as a match official at the tournament, noting that decisions regarding entry and visas ultimately rested with the host government. Although the tournament was jointly hosted by the United States, Canada, and Mexico, referees were required to attend centralized preparations in the United States. FIFA referees committee chairman Pierluigi Collina had established a training hub in Miami for the tournament's 52 referees and 88 assistant referees, making participation in the United States an essential part of tournament officiating preparations.

On 10 June 2026, Artan landed back in Somalia, receiving a warm welcome by authorities and civilians as well as hailing him as a hero. In a brief statement to the press, Artan expressed disappointment with the United States and called on Somalis to defend the name of the country, further stating that he hopes to be at the next FIFA World Cup. Afterwards, FIFA confirmed that Artan would receive his full fee of $100,000 for the 2026 World Cup despite being unable to officiate at the tournament.

=== 2026 UEFA Super Cup ===
On 11 June 2026, days after his US entry denial, Artan was selected by the Union of European Football Associations (UEFA) to referee of the 2026 UEFA Super Cup match between Paris Saint-Germain and Aston Villa, which took place at the Red Bull Arena in Salzburg, Austria on 12 August 2026. His selection followed negotiations between UEFA and the Confederation of African Football (CAF). He became the first ever African to be a referee in a UEFA competition match.

Artan successfully managed the high-profile fixture alongside his assistant referees, Liban Abdoulrazack Ahmed of Djibouti and Stephen Yiembe of Kenya. Following the final whistle, Artan signed the official match ball with the poignant message, "This was my World Cup," expressing deep gratitude to UEFA for giving him a defining moment on the global stage. His performance also earned him a follow-up invitation from UEFA to attend an elite refereeing summer course in Geneva, Switzerland, from August 31 to September 2, alongside an indication from the European governing body that he may officiate future European club competition matches.

=== 2025–26 Kuwaiti Premier League ===
On 21 June 2026, while the World Cup was underway, the Kuwait Football Association (KFA) invited Artan to officiate the final match of the 2025–26 Kuwaiti Premier League season between Kuwait SC and Qadsia SC. The Somali Football Federation welcomed the invitation. Prior to the 29 June fixture, Artan received an award of excellence from the KFA before refereeing the match.

=== 2026 CECAFA Kagame Cup ===
On 2 August 2026, the Council for East and Central Africa Football Associations (CECAFA) appointed Artan to officiate in the 2026 CECAFA Kagame Cup. He was selected as the head referee for the tournament final between Rayon Sports of Rwanda and Gor Mahia of Kenya, held on 7 August 2026 at the Amahoro Stadium in Kigali, Rwanda. Artan successfully managed the high-profile regional club final, which Rayon Sports won 2–1 after extra time, marking his final match assignment on the continent before traveling to Europe for his UEFA appointment.

=== Later developments ===
In October 2026, Egyptian media reported that Artan was considering relocating to Egypt and officiate matches in the Egyptian Premier League after submitting an official request to the Egyptian Football Association (EFA). Essam Abdel Fattah, head of the EFA Referees Committee, confirmed they received Artan’s letter and gave it an ‘initial welcome.’ The request will now go before the EFA Board of Directors for a final decision and to establish the necessary legal and administrative procedures.

== Selected performances ==
Date	Match	Tournament	Venue	Location	Result	Ref
1 June 2025	Pyramids FC vs. Mamelodi Sundowns	2025 CAF Champions League final (second leg)	30 June Stadium	Cairo, Egypt	2–1 (3–2 on aggregate)	
29 June 2026	Kuwait SC vs. Qadsia SC	2025–26 Kuwaiti Premier League (final round)	Mohammed Al-Hamad Stadium	Hawally, Kuwait	0–0	
7 August 2026	Rayon Sports vs. Gor Mahia	2026 CECAFA Kagame Cup final	Amahoro Stadium	Kigali, Rwanda	2–1 (a.e.t.)	
12 August 2026	Paris Saint-Germain vs. Aston Villa	2026 UEFA Super Cup	Red Bull Arena	Salzburg, Austria	2–1	

== Honours ==
- CAF Men’s Referee of the Year Award: 2025
- Zain Premier League – Award of Excellence (Special Honor): 2026

== See also ==
- Anti-Somali sentiment

Sporting positions
Preceded by 2025 (Portugal) João Pinheiro	UEFA Super Cup referee 2026	Succeeded by 2027 TBD
