= UEFA Super Cup =

European association football tournament for clubs

- Organiser(s): UEFA
- Founded: 1972; 54 years ago (official since 1973)
- Region: Europe
- Teams: 2
- Current champions: (France) Paris Saint-Germain (2nd title)
- Most championships: (Spain) Real Madrid (6 titles)
- Website: www.uefa.com/uefasupercup/
- 2026 UEFA Super Cup

The UEFA Super Cup is an annual super cup football match organised by UEFA and contested by the winners of the two main European club competitions: the UEFA Champions League and UEFA Europa League. The competition's official name was originally the Super Competition, and later the European Super Cup. It was renamed the UEFA Super Cup in 1995, following a policy of rebranding by UEFA.

From 1972 to 1999, the UEFA Super Cup was contested between the winners of the European Cup/UEFA Champions League and the winners of the European/UEFA Cup Winners' Cup. After the discontinuation of the UEFA Cup Winners' Cup, it has been contested by the winners of the UEFA Champions League and the winners of the UEFA Cup, which was renamed the UEFA Europa League in 2009.

The current holders are Champions League winners Paris Saint-Germain, who defeated Europa League winners Aston Villa 2–1 in the 2026 edition. Real Madrid are the most successful team in the competition, having won the trophy six times.

== History ==
UEFA Super Cup winners
Key: Qualified as UCL winner Qualified as CWC winner Qualified as UEL winner Abbreviations: UCL = European Cup / UEFA Champions League; CWC = UEFA Cup Winners' Cup; UEL = UEFA Cup / UEFA Europa League
Season	Winner (between UCL and CWC winners)
1973	(Netherlands) Ajax
1974	Not held
1975	(Soviet Union) Dynamo Kyiv
1976	(Belgium) Anderlecht
1977	(England) Liverpool
1978	(Belgium) Anderlecht (2)
1979	(England) Nottingham Forest
1980	(Spain) Valencia
1981	Not held
1982	(England) Aston Villa
1983	(Scotland) Aberdeen
1984	(Italy) Juventus
1985	Not held
1986	(Romania) Steaua București
1987	(Portugal) Porto
1988	(Belgium) KV Mechelen
1989	(Italy) Milan
1990	(Italy) Milan (2)
1991	(England) Manchester United
1992	(Spain) Barcelona
1993	(Italy) Parma
1994	(Italy) Milan (3)
1995	(Netherlands) Ajax (2)
1996	(Italy) Juventus (2)
1997	(Spain) Barcelona (2)
1998	(England) Chelsea
1999	(Italy) Lazio
Season	Winner (between UCL and UEL winners)
2000	(Turkey) Galatasaray
2001	(England) Liverpool (2)
2002	(Spain) Real Madrid
2003	(Italy) Milan (4)
2004	(Spain) Valencia (2)
2005	(England) Liverpool (3)
2006	(Spain) Sevilla
2007	(Italy) Milan (5)
2008	(Russia) Zenit Saint Petersburg
2009	(Spain) Barcelona (3)
2010	(Spain) Atlético Madrid
2011	(Spain) Barcelona (4)
2012	(Spain) Atlético Madrid (2)
2013	(Germany) Bayern Munich
2014	(Spain) Real Madrid (2)
2015	(Spain) Barcelona (5)
2016	(Spain) Real Madrid (3)
2017	(Spain) Real Madrid (4)
2018	(Spain) Atlético Madrid (3)
2019	(England) Liverpool (4)
2020	(Germany) Bayern Munich (2)
2021	(England) Chelsea (2)
2022	(Spain) Real Madrid (5)
2023	(England) Manchester City
2024	(Spain) Real Madrid (6)
2025	(France) Paris Saint-Germain
2026	(France) Paris Saint-Germain (2)

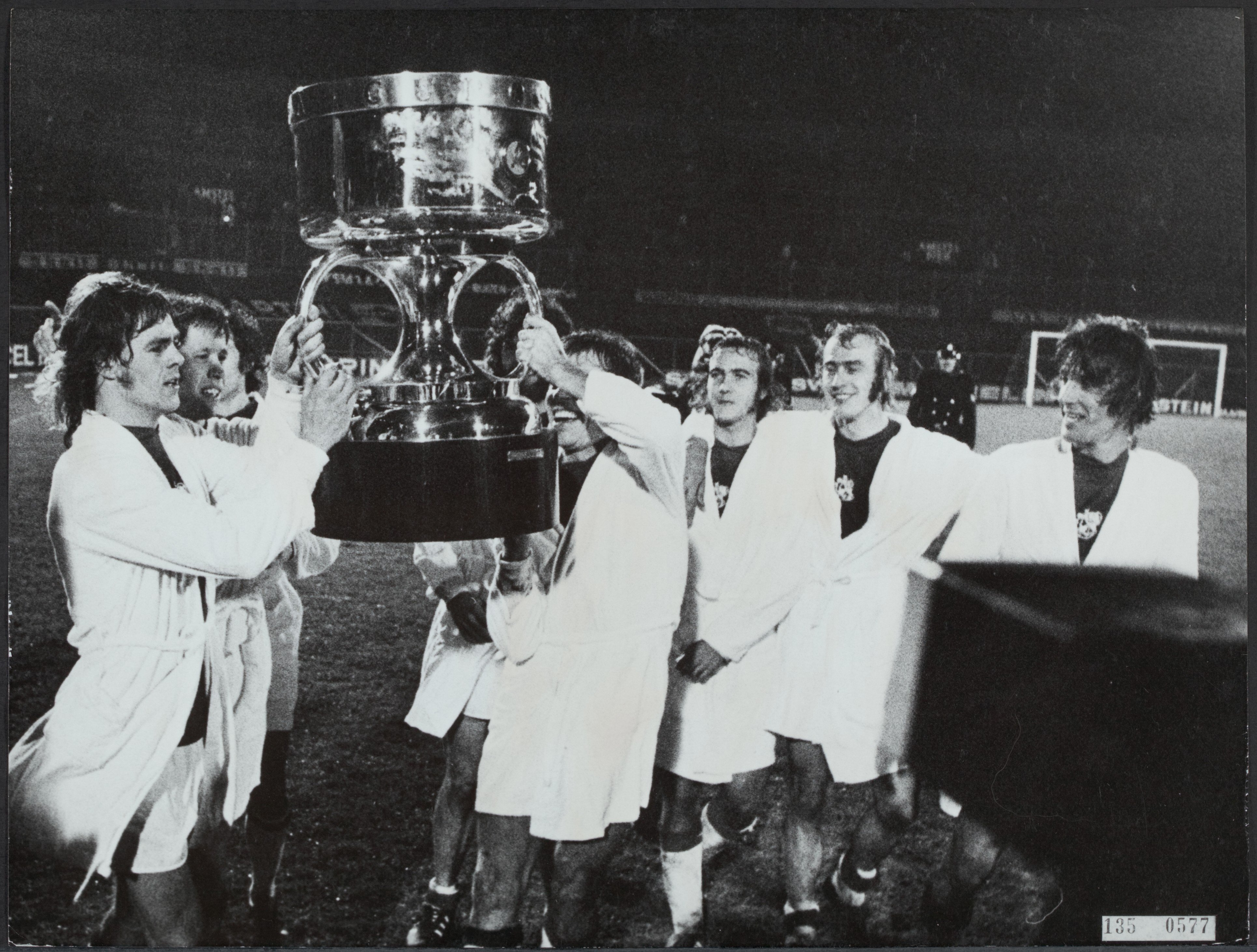
The first official Super Cup trophy was won by Ajax in January 1974.

The European Super Cup was created in 1971 by Anton Witkamp, a reporter and later sports editor of Dutch newspaper De Telegraaf. The idea came to him in a time when Dutch total football was Europe's finest and Dutch football clubs were enjoying their golden era, especially Ajax, who had won three European Cup titles in a row. Witkamp was looking for something new to definitely decide which was the best team in Europe and also to further test Ajax's team, led by their star player Johan Cruyff.

It was then proposed that the winners of the European Cup would face the winners of the European Cup Winners' Cup. However, when Witkamp and Ajax president Jaap van Praag tried to get an official endorsement to this competition, the UEFA president Sándor Barcs turned it down.

The 1972 final between Ajax and Scotland's Rangers is considered unofficial by UEFA, as Rangers were banned from European competition due to the behaviour of their fans during the 1972 European Cup Winners' Cup final. As a result, UEFA refused to endorse the competition until the following season. It was played in two legs and was financially supported by De Telegraaf. Ajax defeated Rangers 6–3 on aggregate and won the first (albeit unofficial) European Super Cup.

The 1973 final, in which Ajax defeated AC Milan 6–1 on aggregate, was the first Super Cup officially recognised and supported by UEFA.

Although the two-legged format was kept until 1997, the Super Cup was decided in one single match because of schedule issues (1984 and 1986) or political problems (1991). In 1974, 1981 and 1985, the Super Cup was not played at all: 1974's competition was abandoned because Bayern Munich and 1. FC Magdeburg could not find a mutually convenient date; 1981's was abandoned when Liverpool could not find space in the schedule to meet Dinamo Tbilisi; while 1985's was abandoned due to a ban on English clubs' participation preventing Everton from playing Juventus.

In the 1992–93 season, the European Cup was renamed the UEFA Champions League and the winners of this competition would face the winners of the Cup Winners' Cup in the European Super Cup. In the 1994–1995 season, the European Cup Winners' Cup was renamed the UEFA Cup Winners' Cup. The following season, the Super Cup also renamed the UEFA Super Cup.

After the 1998–99 season, the Cup Winners' Cup was discontinued by UEFA. The 1999 Super Cup was the last one contested by the winners of the Cup Winners' Cup. Lazio, winners of the 1998–99 UEFA Cup Winners' Cup, defeated Manchester United, winners of the 1998–99 UEFA Champions League, 1–0.

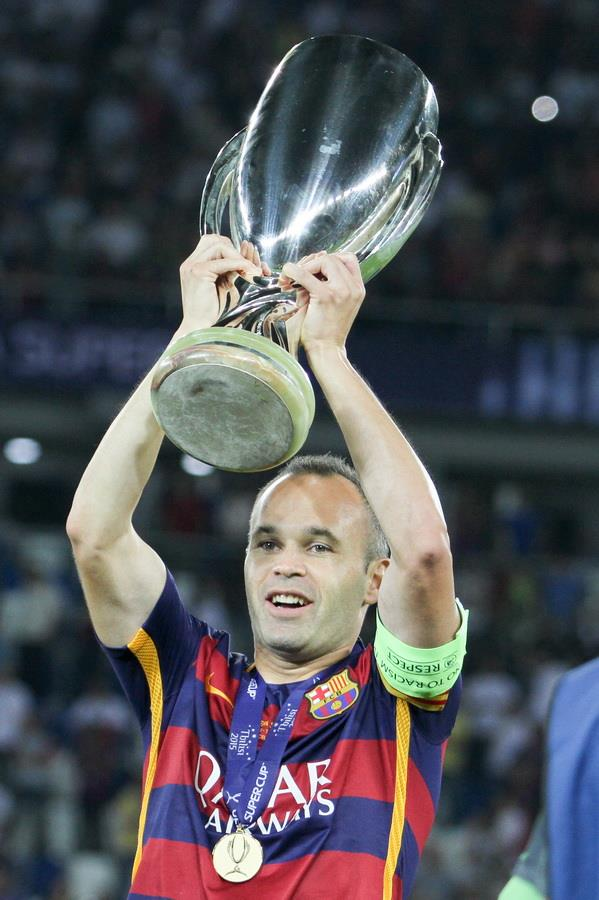
Barcelona captain Andrés Iniesta lifting the 2015 UEFA Super Cup trophy.

Since then, the UEFA Super Cup was contested between the winners of the UEFA Champions League and the winners of the UEFA Cup. The 2000 Super Cup was the first one contested by the winners of the UEFA Cup. Galatasaray, winners of the 1999–2000 UEFA Cup, defeated Real Madrid, winners of the 1999–2000 UEFA Champions League, 2–1.

In the 2009–10 season, the UEFA Cup was renamed the UEFA Europa League and the winners of this competition would continue to face the winners of the Champions League in the UEFA Super Cup.

In 2013, Chelsea became the first club to contest the Super Cup as holders of all three UEFA club honours, having entered as holders of the Cup Winners' Cup (1998), Champions League (2012), and Europa League (2013). Manchester United shared this honour in 2017 after their Europa League win, having qualified as Cup Winners' Cup holders in 1991.

After 15 consecutive Super Cups being played at Stade Louis II in Monaco between 1998 and 2012, the Super Cup is now played at various stadiums (similar to the finals of the Champions League and the Europa League). It was started with the 2013 edition, which was played at Eden Stadium in Prague, Czech Republic.

Starting in 2014, the date of the UEFA Super Cup was moved from Friday in late August, to Tuesday in mid-August, following the removal of the August international friendly date in the new FIFA International Match Calendar.

In 2020, the Super Cup final was originally scheduled to be played at the Estádio do Dragão in Porto, Portugal, on 12 August 2020. However, after the COVID-19 pandemic in Europe caused the postponements of the previous season's club finals, the UEFA Executive Committee chose to award the rescheduled Champions League final to Portugal, and postponed the match for 24 September 2020 and relocated the stadium to Puskás Aréna, Budapest.

Following discussions with its 55 member associations on 19 August 2020, the UEFA Executive Committee decided on 25 August 2020 to use the final as a pilot match for which a reduced number of spectators, up to 30% of the capacity of the stadium, can be allowed in, and it became the first official UEFA match to have spectators since their competitions were resumed in August 2020.

In 2026, UEFA announced that Somali referee Omar Artan would officiate the 2026 UEFA Super Cup, making him the first non-European referee in history to take charge of the match. Made within the framework of a Memorandum of Understanding (MoU) between UEFA and the Confederation of African Football (CAF), the appointment came moments after Artan was denied entry to the United States for the 2026 FIFA World Cup.

== Venues ==
The competition was originally played over two legs, one at the stadium of each participating club, except in exceptional circumstances. For instance, in 1991, when Red Star Belgrade were not allowed to play a match in their native Yugoslavia due to the war at the time, only a home match of Manchester United was played instead.

Since 1998, the Super Cup has been played as a single match at a neutral venue. Between 1998 and 2012, the Super Cup was played at the Stade Louis II in Monaco. Since 2013, it has been played in various stadiums.

=== List of venues since 1998 ===
- 1998–2012: Stade Louis II, Monaco
- 2013: Eden Aréna, Prague, Czech Republic
- 2014: Cardiff City Stadium, Cardiff, Wales
- 2015: Boris Paichadze Dinamo Arena, Tbilisi, Georgia
- 2016: Lerkendal Stadion, Trondheim, Norway
- 2017: Philip II Arena, Skopje, FYR Macedonia
- 2018: Lilleküla Stadium, Tallinn, Estonia
- 2019: Vodafone Park, Istanbul, Turkey
- 2020: Puskás Aréna, Budapest, Hungary
- 2021: Windsor Park, Belfast, Northern Ireland
- 2022: Olympic Stadium, Helsinki, Finland
- 2023: Georgios Karaiskakis Stadium, Piraeus, Greece
- 2024: Stadion Narodowy, Warsaw, Poland
- 2025: Stadio Friuli, Udine, Italy
- 2026: Red Bull Arena, Salzburg, Austria
- 2027: Johan Cruyff Arena, Amsterdam, Netherlands
- 2028: Astana Arena, Astana, Kazakhstan

== Prizes ==
=== Trophy ===
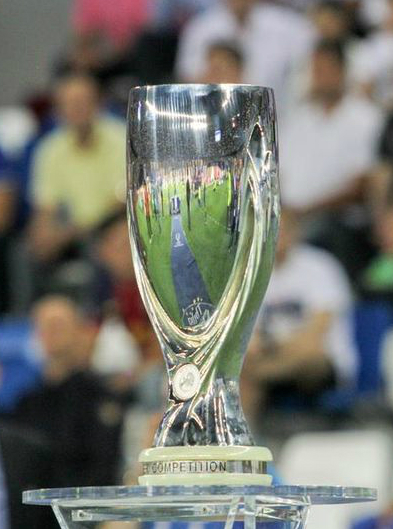
The UEFA Super Cup trophy since 2006

The UEFA Super Cup trophy is retained by UEFA at all times. A full-size replica trophy is awarded to the winning club. Forty gold medals are presented to the winning club and forty silver medals to the runners-up.

The Super Cup trophy has undergone several changes in its history. The first trophy was presented to Ajax in 1973. In 1977, the original trophy was replaced by a plaque with a gold UEFA emblem. In 1987, the next trophy was the smallest and lightest of all the European club trophies, weighing 5 kg (11 lb) and measuring 42.5 cm (16.7 in) in height. The UEFA Champions League trophy weighs 8 kg (18 lb) and the UEFA Europa League trophy 15 kg (33 lb). It was designed and manufactured at the Bertoni workshop in Milan. The new model, which is a larger version of the previous trophy, was introduced in 2006 and weighs 12.2 kg (27 lb) and measures 58 cm (23 in) in height.

Until 2008, a team which won three times in a row or five in total received an original copy of the trophy and a special mark of recognition. Since then, the original trophy has been kept exclusively by UEFA. AC Milan, Barcelona and Real Madrid have achieved this honour, winning a total of five times each, but the Italian team is the only one which was awarded the official trophy permanently in 2007. Barcelona and Real Madrid won their fifth title in 2015 and 2022, respectively, when the policy was no longer in place.

=== Prize money ===
As of 2024, the fixed amount of prize money paid to the clubs is €5 million for the winners and €4 million for the runners-up.

== Rules ==
The UEFA Super Cup is contested as a single match at a neutral venue. The match consists of two periods of 45 minutes each, known as halves. If the scores are level at the end of 90 minutes, the match goes straight to a penalty shoot-out to determine the winners. Before the 2023 edition, two additional 15-minute periods of extra time were played before the match went to penalties if still tied.

Each team names twenty-three players, eleven of whom start the match. Of the twelve remaining players, a total of five may be substituted throughout the match. Each team may wear its first choice kit. If the kits clash, the Europa League holders must wear an alternative kit. If a club refuses to play or is ineligible to play then they are replaced by the runners-up of the competition through which they qualified. If the field is unfit for play due to bad weather, the match must be played the next day.

== Sponsorship ==
The UEFA Super Cup's sponsors are the same as the sponsors for the UEFA Champions League. The tournament's current main sponsors are (as of the 2024–25 season):

- FedEx
- Qatar Airways
- Heineken N.V.
- Just Eat Takeaway
- Mastercard
- PepsiCo
  - Gatorade
  - Lay's
  - Pepsi
- Sony
  - PlayStation 5
- Bet365
- Crypto.com

Adidas is a secondary sponsor and supplies the official match ball, while Macron supplies the referee kits.

Individual clubs may wear jerseys with advertising, even if such sponsors conflict with those of the Super Cup. Only two sponsorships are permitted per jersey, plus that of the manufacturer, at the chest and the left sleeve. Exceptions are made for non-profit organisations, which can feature on the front of the shirt, incorporated with the main sponsor, or on the back, either below the squad number or between the player name and the collar.

== Tickets ==
60% of the stadium capacity is reserved for the visiting clubs. The remaining seats are sold by UEFA through an online auction. There are an unlimited number of applications for tickets given out. The 5 euro administration fee is deducted from each applicant. There is no limit to the number of applications each individual can make.

== Records and statistics ==
=== Performance by club ===
Performance in the UEFA Super Cup by club
Club	Winners	Runners-up	Years won (Note: No competitions were held in 1974, 1981 and 1985.)	Years runners-up
(Spain) Real Madrid	6	3	2002, 2014, 2016, 2017, 2022, 2024	1998, 2000, 2018
(Spain) Barcelona	5	4	1992, 1997, 2009, 2011, 2015	1979, 1982, 1989, 2006
(Italy) Milan	5	2	1989, 1990, 1994, 2003, 2007	1973, 1993
(England) Liverpool	4	2	1977, 2001, 2005, 2019	1978, 1984
(Spain) Atlético Madrid	3	0	2010, 2012, 2018	—
(England) Chelsea	2	3	1998, 2021	2012, 2013, 2019
(Germany) Bayern Munich	2	3	2013, 2020	1975, 1976, 2001
(Netherlands) Ajax (Note: Excludes the 1972 European Super Cup, not organised nor recognised by UEFA as an official title.)	2	1	1973, 1995	1987
(France) Paris Saint-Germain	2	1	2025, 2026	1996
(Belgium) Anderlecht	2	0	1976, 1978	—
(Spain) Valencia	2	0	1980, 2004	—
(Italy) Juventus	2	0	1984, 1996	—
(Spain) Sevilla	1	6	2006	2007, 2014, 2015, 2016, 2020, 2023
(Portugal) Porto	1	3	1987	2003, 2004, 2011
(England) Manchester United	1	3	1991	1999, 2008, 2017
(Soviet Union) Dynamo Kyiv	1	1	1975	1986
(England) Nottingham Forest	1	1	1979	1980
(England) Aston Villa	1	1	1982	2026
(Scotland) Aberdeen	1	0	1983	—
(Romania) Steaua București	1	0	1986	—
(Belgium) KV Mechelen	1	0	1988	—
(Italy) Parma	1	0	1993	—
(Italy) Lazio	1	0	1999	—
(Turkey) Galatasaray	1	0	2000	—
(Russia) Zenit Saint Petersburg	1	0	2008	—
(England) Manchester City	1	0	2023	—
(Germany) Hamburger SV	0	2	—	1977, 1983
(Netherlands) PSV Eindhoven	0	1	—	1988
(Italy) Sampdoria	0	1	—	1990
(Socialist Federal Republic of Yugoslavia) Red Star Belgrade	0	1	—	1991
(Germany) Werder Bremen	0	1	—	1992
(England) Arsenal	0	1	—	1994
(Spain) Zaragoza	0	1	—	1995
(Germany) Borussia Dortmund	0	1	—	1997
(Netherlands) Feyenoord	0	1	—	2002
(Russia) CSKA Moscow	0	1	—	2005
(Ukraine) Shakhtar Donetsk	0	1	—	2009
(Italy) Inter Milan	0	1	—	2010
(Spain) Villarreal	0	1	—	2021
(Germany) Eintracht Frankfurt	0	1	—	2022
(Italy) Atalanta	0	1	—	2024
(England) Tottenham Hotspur	0	1	—	2025

=== Performance by nation ===
Performance by nation
Nation	Winners	Runners-up	Total
Spain	17	15	32
England	10	12	22
Italy	9	5	14
Belgium	3	0	3
Germany (Note: Includes clubs representing West Germany. No clubs representing East Germany appeared in a match.)	2	8	10
Netherlands (Note: Excludes the 1972 European Super Cup, not organised nor recognised by UEFA as an official title.)	2	3	5
France	2	1	3
Portugal	1	3	4
Russia	1	1	2
Soviet Union (Note: Both Soviet appearances were made by a Ukrainian SSR club.)	1	1	2
Romania	1	0	1
Scotland	1	0	1
Turkey	1	0	1
Ukraine	0	1	1
Yugoslavia (Note: The Yugoslav appearance was made by a club from SR Serbia.)	0	1	1
Total	51	51	102

=== Club records ===
==== Finalists from the same country ====
- On eight occasions, the Super Cup match has involved two teams from the same nation:
  - (Italy) 1990: Milan and Sampdoria
  - (Italy) 1993: Parma and Milan
  - (Spain) 2006: Sevilla and Barcelona
  - (Spain) 2014: Real Madrid and Sevilla
  - (Spain) 2015: Barcelona and Sevilla
  - (Spain) 2016: Real Madrid and Sevilla
  - (Spain) 2018: Atlético Madrid and Real Madrid
  - (England) 2019: Liverpool and Chelsea

=== Individual records ===
- Most wins by player: Dani Carvajal and Luka Modrić (5 wins each)
- Most matches by player: Roberto Donadoni and Alessandro Costacurta (8 matches each)
- Most wins with different clubs by player: Mateo Kovačić (three clubs), with Real Madrid (2016, 2017), Chelsea (2021) and Manchester City (2023)
- Most wins by coach: Carlo Ancelotti (5 wins)
- Most editions contested by coach: Carlo Ancelotti (5 editions)
- All-time top scorers: Arie Haan, Oleg Blokhin, David Fairclough, Gerd Müller, Rob Rensenbrink, François Van der Elst, Terry McDermott, Radamel Falcao and Lionel Messi (3 goals each)
- Most wins with different clubs by coach: Pep Guardiola (three clubs), with Barcelona (2009, 2011), Bayern Munich (2013) and Manchester City (2023)
- Fastest goal: 50 seconds, Diego Costa, against Real Madrid on 15 August 2018

==== Hat-tricks ====
- Only player to have scored a hat-trick in a two-legged final: Terry McDermott, against Hamburger SV on 6 December 1977
- Only player to have scored a hat-trick in a single final: Radamel Falcao, against Chelsea on 31 August 2012

== See also ==
- Recopa Sudamericana – South American equivalent
- List of UEFA Super Cup winning managers
- CAF Super Cup – African equivalent
- List of UEFA Super Cup goalscorers
- Asian Super Cup – Asian equivalent
