= Yeimar Mosquera =

Colombian footballer (born 2005)

Personal information
- Full name: Yeimar Jesús Mosquera Mosquera
- Date of birth: 6 February 2005 (age 21)
- Place of birth: Istmina, Chocó, Colombia
- Height: 1.90 m (6 ft 3 in)
- Position: Centre-back

Team information
- Current team: Vitória
- Number: 15

Youth career
- Sócrates Valencia
- Deportivo Pereira

Senior career*
Years	Team	Apps	(Gls)
2024	Orsomarso	19	(2)
2024–2026	Aston Villa	0	(0)
2024–2025	→ Real Unión (loan)	7	(0)
2026–	Vitória	0	(0)

International career^{‡}
2024–2025	Colombia U20	24	(0)
Medal record
Men's football
Representing Colombia
FIFA U-20 World Cup
Third place	2025 Chile
South American U-20 Championship
Third place	2025 Venezuela
- * Club domestic league appearances and goals as of 11:38, 7 January 2025 (UTC) ‡ National team caps and goals as of 09:34, 17 July 2026 (UTC)

Yeimar Jesús Mosquera Mosquera (born 6 February 2005) is a Colombian footballer who plays as a centre-back for Primeira Liga club Vitória. He is a product of the Deportivo Pereira academy and played in the Colombian second tier for Orsomarso. He signed for Premier League side Aston Villa in 2024, where he appeared for their youth sides and spent time on loan at sister club Real Unión. Mosquera transferred to Vitória in July 2026.

Mosquera has been a regular for the Colombia U20 side and was a key player in their third-place finish at the 2025 FIFA U-20 World Cup in Chile and the 2025 South American U-20 Championship in Venezuela, also finishing third.

== Club career ==
=== Early career ===
Born in Istmina in the Chocó Department of Colombia, Mosquera played for Sócrates Valencia in his youth. In 2023, he featured in the Juegos Nacionales (National Games) with the under-17 representative side of the Risaralda Department. He played in the academy of professional side Deportivo Pereira before joining second division side Orsomarso in January 2024.

Having made his debut in the 2024 edition of the Categoría Primera B, Mosquera drew interest from fellow Colombian side Deportes Tolima, as well as American side Los Angeles FC. Despite this interest, Mosquera remained with Orsomarso, but in August of the same year, he was strongly linked with English Premier League side Aston Villa, with the West Midlands club reportedly making a formal approach.

=== Aston Villa ===
On 30 August 2024, Mosquera signed for English Premier League club Aston Villa for an undisclosed fee, being assigned to their academy.

He made his first team debut during a 1–0 friendly loss against EFL League Two club Walsall on 16 July 2025.

==== Loan to Real Unión ====
He was immediately sent on loan to Villa's sister club Real Unión in the Spanish third tier. On 2 October 2024, Mosquero made his debut for Unión as a substitute in a 0–0 draw away at Tarazona.

On 28 January 2025, Aston Villa recalled Mosquera from his loan.

=== Vitória ===
On 16 July 2026, Mosquera moved once again within the V Sports group, signing for Primeira Liga club Vitória for an undisclosed fee.

== International career ==
Mosquera was first involved with the Colombia under-20 side in May 2024, being part of manager César Torres' first squad for a microcycle. He was called up again the following month, featuring in games against Peru and Honduras. Mosquera was included in Colombia's squad for the 2025 South American U-20 Championship for their games against Bolivia, Brazil, Argentina and Ecuador.

== Career statistics ==
As of 17 July 2026.

Appearances and goals by club, season and competition
Club	Season	League			National cup (Note: Includes Copa Colombia)		Continental		Other		Total	
Club	Season	Division	Apps	Goals	Apps	Goals	Apps	Goals	Apps	Goals	Apps	Goals
Orsomarso	2024	Categoría Primera B	19	2	1	0	—		0	0	20	2
Aston Villa	2024–25	Premier League	0	0	0	0	0	0	0	0	0	0
Aston Villa	2025–26	Premier League	0	0	0	0	0	0	0	0	0	0
Aston Villa	Total		0	0	0	0	0	0	0	0	0	0
Real Unión (loan)	2024–25	Primera Federación	7	0	0	0	—		0	0	7	0
Career total			24	2	1	0	0	0	0	0	27	2

== Honours ==
Colombia U20

- FIFA U-20 World Cup third place: 2025
