= 2024–25 Aston Villa F.C. season =

English football club season

Aston Villa
2024–25 season
- Owner: V Sports (Nassef Sawiris, Wes Edens & Atairos)
- Chairman: Nassef Sawiris
- Manager: Unai Emery
- Stadium: Villa Park
- Premier League: 6th
- FA Cup: Semi-finals
- EFL Cup: Fourth round
- UEFA Champions League: Quarter-finals
- Top goalscorer: League: Ollie Watkins (16); All: Ollie Watkins (17)
- Average home league attendance: 41,873
- Biggest win: 3–0 v Young Boys (A) (18 September 2024, UEFA Champions League); 3–0 v Club Brugge (H) (12 March 2025, UEFA Champions League); 3–0 v Preston North End (A) (30 March 2025, FA Cup); 3–0 v Brighton & Hove Albion (A) (2 April 2025, Premier League); 3–0 v Southampton (A) (12 April 2025, Premier League); 4–1 v Newcastle United (H) (19 April 2025, Premier League)
- Biggest defeat: 1–4 v Tottenham Hotspur (A) (3 November 2024, Premier League); 0–3 v Chelsea (A) (1 December 2024, Premier League); 0–3 v Newcastle United (A) (26 December 2024, Premier League); 1–4 v Crystal Palace (A) (25 February 2025, Premier League); 0–3 v Crystal Palace (N) (26 April 2025, FA Cup)
| Home colours | Away colours | Third colours |

The 2024–25 season was Aston Villa's 30th season in the Premier League and the 150th season in the history of Aston Villa Football Club, and their sixth consecutive season in the Premier League. In addition to the domestic league, the club also participated in the FA Cup, the EFL Cup, and for the very first time the Champions League; Villa's last participation at the top level of European club competition was in the European Cup of the 1982–83 season. The season saw them finish sixth, narrowly missing out on a Champions League place only by virtue of goal difference.

== Players ==
As of 25 May 2025

The season was the first since 2018-19 without Douglas Luiz, who departed to Juventus, although he would return to Villa on loan a year and a half later.

| No. | Player | Position | Nationality | Place of birth | Date of birth (age) | Signed from | Date signed | Fee | Contract end | Apps | Goals |
Goalkeepers
| 23 | Emiliano Martínez | GK | (Argentina) | Mar del Plata | 2 September 1992 (aged 32) | Arsenal | 16 September 2020 | £17,000,000 | 30 June 2029 | 212 | 0 |
| 25 | Robin Olsen | GK | (Sweden) | Malmö | 8 January 1990 (aged 35) | (Italy) Roma | 4 June 2022 | £3,000,000 | 30 June 2025 | 22 | 0 |
| 48 | Oliwier Zych | GK | (Poland) | Gdynia | 28 June 2004 (aged 21) | (Poland) Zagłębie Lubin | 29 September 2020 | Free | 30 June 2026 | 0 | 0 |
Defenders
| 2 | Matty Cash | RB | (Poland) | (England) Slough | 7 August 1997 (aged 27) | Nottingham Forest | 3 September 2020 | £14,000,000 | 30 June 2027 | 180 | 10 |
| 3 | Axel Disasi | CB | (France) | Gonesse | 11 March 1998 (aged 27) | Chelsea | 4 February 2025 | Loan | 30 June 2025 | 10 | 0 |
| 4 | Ezri Konsa | CB | (England) | Newham | 23 October 1997 (aged 27) | Brentford | 11 July 2019 | £13,000,000 | 30 June 2028 | 238 | 10 |
| 5 | Tyrone Mings | CB | (England) | Bath | 13 March 1993 (aged 32) | Bournemouth | 8 July 2019 | £22,000,000 | 30 June 2026 | 187 | 8 |
| 12 | Lucas Digne | LB | (France) | Meaux | 20 July 1993 (aged 31) | Everton | 13 January 2022 | £30,000,000 | 30 June 2026 | 137 | 4 |
| 14 | Pau Torres | CB | (Spain) | Villarreal | 16 January 1997 (aged 28) | (Spain) Villarreal | 12 July 2023 | £31,500,000 | 30 June 2028 | 72 | 2 |
| 16 | Andrés García | RB | (Spain) | Valencia | 7 February 2003 (aged 22) | (Spain) Levante | 21 January 2025 | £6,000,000 | 30 June 2029 | 10 | 0 |
| 22 | Ian Maatsen | LB | (Netherlands) | Vlaardingen | 10 March 2002 (aged 23) | Chelsea | 28 June 2024 | £37,500,000 | 30 June 2030 | 45 | 2 |
| 30 | Kortney Hause | CB | (England) | Goodmayes | 16 July 1995 (aged 29) | Wolverhampton Wanderers | 17 June 2019 | £3,000,000 | 30 June 2025 | 43 | 3 |
| —N/a | Yeimar Mosquera | CB | (Colombia) | Istmina | 6 February 2005 (aged 20) | (Colombia) Orsmoarso | 30 August 2024 | Undisclosed | 30 June 2030 | 0 | 0 |
Midfielders
| 6 | Ross Barkley | CM | (England) | Liverpool | 5 December 1993 (aged 31) | Luton Town | 1 July 2024 | £5,000,000 | 30 June 2027 | 53 | 7 |
| 7 | John McGinn (c) | CM | (Scotland) | Glasgow | 18 October 1994 (aged 30) | (Scotland) Hibernian | 8 August 2018 | £3,000,000 | 30 June 2027 | 285 | 30 |
| 8 | Youri Tielemans | CM | (Belgium) | Sint-Pieters-Leeuw | 7 May 1997 (aged 28) | Leicester City | 1 July 2023 | Free transfer | 30 June 2027 | 99 | 8 |
| 24 | Amadou Onana | DM | (Belgium) | (Senegal) Dakar | 20 August 2001 (aged 23) | Everton | 22 July 2024 | £50,000,000 | 30 June 2029 | 34 | 5 |
| 26 | Lamare Bogarde | DM | (Netherlands) | Rotterdam | 5 January 2004 (aged 21) | (Netherlands) Feyenoord | 1 September 2020 | Free transfer | 30 June 2028 | 17 | 0 |
| 41 | Jacob Ramsey | AM | (England) | Great Barr | 28 May 2001 (aged 24) | Academy | 1 July 2020 | —N/a | 30 June 2027 | 167 | 17 |
| 44 | Boubacar Kamara | DM | (France) | Marseille | 23 November 1999 (aged 25) | (France) Marseille | 1 July 2022 | Free transfer | 30 June 2027 | 96 | 2 |
| 54 | Aidan Borland | CM | (Scotland) | Glasgow | 25 April 2007 (aged 18) | (Scotland) Celtic | 1 March 2024 | Free transfer | 30 June 2028 | 1 | 0 |
| 56 | Jamaldeen Jimoh-Aloba | AM | (England) | Birmingham | 2 October 2006 (aged 18) | Academy | 1 July 2023 | —N/a | 30 June 2028 | 3 | 0 |
| 79 | Ben Broggio | AM | (England) | Sutton Coldfield | 29 January 2007 (aged 18) | Academy | 2 February 2024 | —N/a | 30 June 2030 | 1 | 0 |
Forwards
| 9 | Marcus Rashford | CF | (England) | Manchester | 31 October 1997 (aged 27) | Manchester United | 2 February 2025 | Loan | 30 June 2025 | 17 | 4 |
| 11 | Ollie Watkins | CF | (England) | Torquay | 30 December 1995 (aged 29) | Brentford | 9 September 2020 | £34,000,000 | 30 June 2028 | 223 | 87 |
| 17 | Donyell Malen | RW | (Netherlands) | Wieringen | 19 January 1999 (aged 26) | (Germany) Borussia Dortmund | 14 January 2025 | £21,500,000 | 30 June 2028 | 17 | 3 |
| 21 | Marco Asensio | RW | (Spain) | Palma De Mallorca | 21 January 1996 (aged 29) | (France) Paris Saint-Germain | 3 February 2025 | Loan | 30 June 2025 | 21 | 8 |
| 27 | Morgan Rogers | LW | (England) | Halesowen | 26 July 2002 (aged 22) | Middlesbrough | 1 February 2024 | £8,000,000 | 30 June 2030 | 70 | 17 |
| 31 | Leon Bailey | RW | (Jamaica) | Kingston | 9 August 1997 (aged 27) | (Germany) Bayer Leverkusen | 4 August 2021 | £32,000,000 | 30 June 2027 | 143 | 22 |
Out on loan
| 10 | Emiliano Buendía | AM | (Argentina) | Mar del Plata | 25 December 1996 (aged 28) | Norwich City | 10 June 2021 | £38,000,000 | 30 June 2027 | 97 | 10 |
| 15 | Àlex Moreno | LB | (Spain) | Sant Sadurní d'Anoia | 8 June 1993 (aged 32) | (Spain) Real Betis | 11 January 2023 | £13,000,000 | 30 June 2026 | 47 | 3 |
| 17 | Samuel Iling-Junior | LW | (England) | Islington | 10 April 2003 (aged 22) | (Italy) Juventus | 1 July 2024 | £11,900,000 | 30 June 2029 | 0 | 0 |
| 18 | Joe Gauci | GK | (Australia) | Adelaide | 4 July 2000 (aged 24) | (Australia) Adelaide United | 1 February 2024 | £1,290,000 | 30 June 2028 | 2 | 0 |
| 20 | Kosta Nedeljković | RB | (Serbia) | Smederevo | 16 December 2005 (aged 19) | (Serbia) Red Star Belgrade | 22 January 2024 | £6,500,000 | 30 June 2029 | 10 | 0 |
| 21 | Enzo Barrenechea | DM | (Argentina) | Villa María | 22 May 2001 (aged 24) | (Italy) Juventus | 1 July 2024 | £6,800,000 | 30 June 2029 | 0 | 0 |
| 23 | Philippe Coutinho | LW | (Brazil) | Rio de Janeiro | 12 June 1992 (aged 33) | (Spain) Barcelona | 10 June 2022 | £20,000,000 | 30 June 2026 | 43 | 6 |
| 23 | Lewis Dobbin | LW | (England) | Stoke-on-Trent | 3 January 2003 (aged 22) | Everton | 23 June 2024 | £10,000,000 | 30 June 2028 | 0 | 0 |
| 29 | Kaine Kesler-Hayden | RB | (England) | Birmingham | 23 October 2002 (aged 22) | Academy | 1 July 2021 | —N/a | 30 June 2027 | 5 | 0 |
| 32 | Leander Dendoncker | DM | (Belgium) | Passendale | 15 April 1995 (aged 30) | Wolverhampton Wanderers | 1 September 2022 | £13,000,000 | 30 June 2025 | 36 | 1 |
| 35 | Louie Barry | LW | (England) | Sutton Coldfield | 21 June 2003 (aged 22) | (Spain) Barcelona | 23 January 2020 | £880,000 | 30 June 2026 | 1 | 1 |
| 42 | Filip Marschall | GK | (England) | Cambridge | 24 April 2003 (aged 22) | Cambridge City | 26 January 2018 | Free transfer | 30 June 2027 | 1 | 0 |
| 46 | Rico Richards | AM | (England) | West Bromwich | 27 September 2003 (aged 21) | West Bromwich Albion | 3 July 2023 | Free transfer | 30 June 2026 | 0 | 0 |
| 50 | Sil Swinkels | CB | (Netherlands) | Sint-Oedenrode | 6 January 2004 (aged 21) | (Netherlands) Vitesse | 3 August 2020 | Free transfer | 30 June 2028 | 2 | 0 |
| 58 | Tommi O'Reilly | CM | (England) | Birmingham | 15 December 2003 (aged 21) | Academy | 1 July 2021 | —N/a | 30 June 2028 | 1 | 0 |
| 59 | Josh Feeney | CB | (England) | Fleetwood | 6 May 2005 (aged 20) | Fleetwood Town | 6 July 2021 | Free transfer | 30 June 2025 | 0 | 0 |
| 64 | James Wright | GK | (England) | | 2 December 2004 (aged 20) | Manchester City | 1 July 2021 | Free transfer | 30 June 2027 | 0 | 0 |
| 66 | Travis Patterson | LB | (England) | Wolverhampton | 6 October 2005 (aged 19) | Academy | 1 July 2024 | —N/a | 30 June 2028 | 1 | 0 |
| 69 | Finley Munroe | LB | (England) | | 8 February 2005 (aged 20) | Chelsea | 1 July 2021 | —N/a | 30 June 2026 | 2 | 0 |
| 72 | Kadan Young | RW | (England) | Erdington | 19 January 2006 (aged 19) | Academy | 20 January 2023 | —N/a | 30 June 2028 | 2 | 0 |
| 77 | Kobei Moore | CF | (England) | Birmingham | 30 November 2004 (aged 20) | Academy | 1 July 2023 | —N/a | 30 June 2029 | 0 | 0 |
| —N/a | Lino Sousa | LB | (England) | (Portugal) Lisbon | 19 January 2005 (aged 20) | Arsenal | 1 February 2024 | Undisclosed | 30 June 2028 | 0 | 0 |

== Transfers ==
In

| Date | Position | Player | From | Fee | Ref. |
|---|---|---|---|---|---|
| 14 June 2024 (Note: The transfer was announced by Unai Emery in a press conference on 17 May, and would become official on 14 June once the transfer window re-opened.) | CF | (England) Cameron Archer | (England) Sheffield United | Undisclosed | |
| 18 June 2024 | CB | (Norway) Ethan Amundsen-Day (Note: Academy transfer) | (Denmark) Copenhagen | Undisclosed | |
| 23 June 2024 | LW | (England) Lewis Dobbin | (England) Everton | £10,000,000 | |
| 28 June 2024 | LB | (Netherlands) Ian Maatsen | (England) Chelsea | £37,500,000 | |
| 1 July 2024 | RW | (Egypt) Omar Khedr | (Egypt) ZED | £2,360,000 | |
| 1 July 2024 | LW | (England) Samuel Iling-Junior | (Italy) Juventus | £11,900,000 | |
| 1 July 2024 | CM | (Argentina) Enzo Barrenechea | (Italy) Juventus | £6,800,000 | |
| 1 July 2024 | CM | (England) Ross Barkley | (England) Luton Town | £5,000,000 | |
| 7 July 2024 | FW | (England) Max Jenner | (England) West Bromwich Albion | Free | |
| 19 July 2024 | LW | (England) Jaden Philogene | (England) Hull City | £13,000,000 | |
| 22 July 2024 | DM | (Belgium) Amadou Onana | (England) Everton | £50,000,000 | |
| 24 July 2024 | CB | (England) Leon Routh | (England) Luton Town | Undisclosed | |
| 12 August 2024 | FW | (England) Mason Cotcher | (England) Sunderland | Undisclosed | |
| 20 August 2024 | CM | (England) Kane Taylor | (England) Manchester City | £750,000 | |
| 30 August 2024 | CB | (Colombia) Yeimar Mosquera | (Colombia) Orsomarso | Undisclosed | |
| 4 September 2024 | GK | (England) Owen Asemota | (England) Arsenal | Free | |
| 14 January 2025 | FW | (Netherlands) Donyell Malen | (Germany) Borussia Dortmund | £21,500,000 | |
| 21 January 2025 | RB | (Spain) Andrés García | (Spain) Levante | £6,000,000 | |

Out

| Date | Pos. | Player | To | Fee | Ref. |
|---|---|---|---|---|---|
| 14 June 2024 (Note: The transfer was announced on 15 May, and would become official on 14 June once the transfer window re-opened.) | CM | (France) Morgan Sanson | (France) Nice | Undisclosed | |
| 22 June 2024 | CM | (England) Tim Iroegbunam | (England) Everton | £9,000,000 | |
| 29 June 2024 | AM | (England) Omari Kellyman | (England) Chelsea | £19,000,000 | |
| 30 June 2024 | CM | (Brazil) Douglas Luiz | (Italy) Juventus | £42,350,000 | |
| 15 July 2024 | LB | (England) Sebastian Revan | (Wales) Wrexham | Undisclosed | |
| 16 July 2024 | GK | (Finland) Viljami Sinisalo | (Scotland) Celtic | £1,000,000 | |
| 24 July 2024 | RW | (France) Moussa Diaby | (Saudi Arabia) Al-Ittihad | £50,500,000 | |
| 30 July 2024 | LB | (England) Ben Chrisene | (England) Norwich City | Undisclosed | |
| 16 August 2024 | CF | (England) Cameron Archer | (England) Southampton | £15,000,000 | |
| 15 January 2025 | LW | (England) Jaden Philogene | (England) Ipswich Town | £20,000,000 | |
| 23 January 2025 | CB | (Brazil) Diego Carlos | (Turkey) Fenerbahçe | £8,500,000 | |
| 31 January 2025 | CF | (Colombia) Jhon Durán | (Saudi Arabia) Al Nassr | £71,000,000 | |

Income: £164,810,000 (not inc. any undisclosed transfers)
Outgoings: £227,850,000 (not inc. any undisclosed transfers)
Total Spend: ▲£63,040,000

Loaned in

| Date | Position | Player | From | Date until | Ref. |
|---|---|---|---|---|---|
| 2 February 2025 | CF | (England) Marcus Rashford | (England) Manchester United | End of Season | |
| 3 February 2025 | RW | (Spain) Marco Asensio | (France) Paris Saint-Germain | End of Season | |
| 4 February 2025 | CB | (France) Axel Disasi | (England) Chelsea | End of Season | |

Loaned out

| Date | Position | Player | To | Date until | Ref. |
|---|---|---|---|---|---|
| 10 July 2024 | AM | (Brazil) Philippe Coutinho | (Brazil) Vasco da Gama | End of season | |
| 11 July 2024 | CM | (England) Tommi O'Reilly | (England) Shrewsbury Town | 16 January 2025 (Note: On 16 January, O'Reilly was recalled from his loan at Shrewsbury and was subsequently loaned to MK Dons) | |
| 19 July 2024 | GK | (England) Filip Marschall | (England) Crewe Alexandra | End of season | |
| 2 August 2024 | CF | (England) Louie Barry | (England) Stockport County | 2 January 2025 (Note: On 22 December, it was announced that Barry would be recalled back from his loan at Stockport in January) | |
| 6 August 2024 | CB | (England) Josh Feeney | (England) Shrewsbury Town | End of season | |
| 6 August 2024 | LW | (England) Lewis Dobbin | (England) West Bromwich Albion | 2 January 2025 (Note: On 2 January, Dobbin was recalled back from West Bromwich Albion) | |
| 7 August 2024 | RB | (England) Kaine Kesler-Hayden | (England) Preston North End | End of season | |
| 14 August 2024 | LB | (England) Lino Sousa | (England) Bristol Rovers | End of season | |
| 16 August 2024 | GK | (England) James Wright | (Spain) Real Unión | End of season | |
| 21 August 2024 | LB | (Spain) Àlex Moreno | (England) Nottingham Forest | End of season | |
| 24 August 2024 | LB | (England) Finley Munroe | (Spain) Real Unión | End of season | |
| 27 August 2024 | LW | (England) Samuel Iling-Junior | (Italy) Bologna | 3 February 2025 (Note: On 3 February, Iling-Junior was recalled back from Bologna so he could go on loan to Middlesbrough) | |
| 30 August 2024 | CB | (Colombia) Yeimar Mosquera | (Spain) Real Unión | 28 January 2025 (Note: On 28 January, Aston Villa recalled Mosquera from his loan amidst an injury crisis at centre-back.) | |
| 30 August 2024 | CM | (Argentina) Enzo Barrenechea | (Spain) Valencia | End of season | |
| 30 August 2024 | AM | (England) Rico Richards | (England) Port Vale | End of season | |
| 31 August 2024 | DM | (Belgium) Leander Dendoncker | (Belgium) Anderlecht | End of season | |
| 3 January 2025 | LW | (England) Lewis Dobbin | (England) Norwich City | End of season | |
| 16 January 2025 | AM | (England) Tommi O'Reilly | (England) Milton Keynes Dons | End of season | |
| 29 January 2025 | LW | (England) Louie Barry | (England) Hull City | End of season | |
| 29 January 2025 | AM | (Argentina) Emiliano Buendía | (Germany) Bayer Leverkusen | End of season | |
| 30 January 2025 | GK | (Australia) Joe Gauci | (England) Barnsley | End of season | |
| 31 January 2025 | CF | (England) Charlie Lutz | (England) Kidderminster Harriers | End of season | |
| 31 January 2025 | CF | (England) Kobei Moore | (England) Fleetwood Town | End of season | |
| 3 February 2025 | RB | (Serbia) Kosta Nedeljković | (Germany) RB Leipzig | End of season | |
| 3 February 2025 | CB | (Netherlands) Sil Swinkels | (England) Bristol Rovers | End of season | |
| 3 February 2025 | LW | (England) Samuel Iling-Junior | (England) Middlesbrough | End of season | |
| 3 February 2025 | LB | (England) Travis Patterson | (England) Milton Keynes Dons | End of season | |
| 3 February 2025 | LW | (England) Kadan Young | (Belgium) Royal Antwerp | End of season | |

Released / out of contract

| Date | Pos. | Player | Subsequent club | Join date | Ref. |
|---|---|---|---|---|---|
| 30 June 2024 | CB | (England) Jack McDowell | (England) Queens Park Rangers | 1 July 2024 | |
| 30 June 2024 | CM | (England) Abube Onuchukwu | (England) Ipswich Town | 1 July 2024 | |
| 30 June 2024 | CM | (England) Dylan Mitchell | (England) Swindon Town | 10 July 2024 | |
| 12 July 2024 | CB | (England) Calum Chambers | (Wales) Cardiff City | 14 July 2024 | |
| 30 June 2024 | RB | (England) Frankie Ealing | (Wales) Aberystwyth Town | 3 August 2024 | |
| 30 June 2024 | CM | (England) Edward Rowe | (England) Leamington | 4 August 2024 | |
| 30 June 2024 | CB | (Republic of Ireland) Aaron O'Reilly | (England) Huddersfield Town | 28 August 2024 | |
| 30 June 2024 | DM | (England) Taylor-Jay Hart | (England) Peterborough Sports | 24 September 2024 | |
| 30 June 2024 | LW | (England) Chisom Afoka | Free agent | N/A | |

== Pre-season and friendlies ==
On 25 April 2024, Villa announced a return to the United States for a three-game pre-season tour, with matches against Columbus Crew, RB Leipzig and Club América, along with a trip to Germany to face Borussia Dortmund and the annual pre-season opener in England against Walsall. Two additional friendlies, away to Slovak club Spartak Trnava and against Athletic Bilbao at the Bescot Stadium were announced on 5 June. On 15 July, another friendly between non-league Chasetown and a selection of U21 and senior players who were not traveling to Slovakia was announced. During a 2-week break due to fixture cancellation and an international break, Aston Villa announced they would play a friendly with local club Al Ain while on a warm weather training camp in Abu Dhabi.

Win Draw Loss Fixtures

| 17 July 2024 Friendly | Walsall | 0–3 | Aston Villa | Walsall |
| 19:30 BST | | Report | Rogers 21', 36'; Barry 89' | Stadium: Bescot Stadium; Attendance: 8,200 |

| 20 July 2024 Friendly | Chasetown | 0–1 | Aston Villa XI | Chasetown |
| 14:00 BST | | Report | Moore 65' | Stadium: The Scholars Ground; Attendance: 1,073 |

| 20 July 2024 Friendly | Spartak Trnava | 0–3 | Aston Villa | Trnava, Slovakia |
| 16:00 CEST (15:00 BST) | | Report | Diego Carlos (yellow card) 16'; Bailey 38'; Rogers 53'; Archer 89' | Stadium: Anton Malatinský Stadium; Attendance: 16,090 |

| 27 July 2024 Friendly | Columbus Crew | 4–1 | Aston Villa | Columbus, United States |
| 20:00 EDT (01:00 BST) | Hernández 14', 39', 45'; Chambost 52'; Yeboah (yellow card) 79' | Report | Archer 44' | Stadium: Lower.com Field; Attendance: 20,218 |

| 31 July 2024 Friendly | RB Leipzig | 2–0 | Aston Villa | Harrison, United States |
| 20:00 EDT (01:00 BST) | Silva 17'; Openda (yellow card) 27', (goal) 41' | Report | Diego Carlos (yellow card) 27' (yellow-red card) 42' | Stadium: Red Bull Arena |

| 3 August 2024 Friendly | Club América | 1–0 | Aston Villa | Chicago, United States |
| 16:30 CDT (22:30 BST) | Hernández 77' | Report | | Stadium: Soldier Field; Attendance: 22,225; Referee: Fotis Bazakos (United States) |

| 7 August 2024 Friendly | Aston Villa | 3–2 | Athletic Bilbao | Walsall |
| 19:30 BST | Ramsey 4'; Philogene 60'; Archer 88' | Report | Yeray 25'; Guruzeta 71' | Stadium: Bescot Stadium; Attendance: 9,227; Referee: Robert Jones (England) |

| 10 August 2024 Friendly | Borussia Dortmund | 2–0 | Aston Villa | Dortmund, Germany |
| 17:00 CEST (16:00 BST) | Can 33' (pen.); Brandt 35' | Report | | Stadium: Westfalenstadion; Attendance: 81,365; Referee: Bastian Börner (Germany) |

| 20 March 2025 Friendly | Al Ain | 1–3 | Aston Villa | Al Ain, United Arab Emirates |
| 22:00 UTC+4 (18:00 GMT) | Awadalla 12' | Report | Asensio 19'; Disasi 44'; Taylor 45+2' | Stadium: Hazza bin Zayed Stadium |

== Competitions ==
=== Overall record ===
| Competition | First match | Last match | Starting round | Final position | Record | | | | | | | |
| Competition | First match | Last match | Starting round | Final position | Pld | W | D | L | GF | GA | GD | Win % |
|---|---|---|---|---|---|---|---|---|---|---|---|---|
| Premier League | 17 August 2024 | 25 May 2025 | Matchday 1 | 6th | 38 | 19 | 9 | 10 | 58 | 51 | +7 | 50.00 |
| FA Cup | 10 January 2025 | 26 April 2025 | Third round | Semi-finals | 5 | 4 | 0 | 1 | 9 | 5 | +4 | 80.00 |
| EFL Cup | 24 September 2024 | 30 October 2024 | Third round | Fourth round | 2 | 1 | 0 | 1 | 3 | 3 | +0 | 50.00 |
| UEFA Champions League | 17 September 2024 | 15 April 2025 | League phase | Quarter-finals | 12 | 8 | 1 | 3 | 23 | 12 | +11 | 66.67 |
| Total | | | | | 57 | 32 | 10 | 15 | 93 | 71 | +22 | 56.14 |

Source: Soccerway

=== Premier League ===
==== League table ====
| Pos | Team | Pld | W | D | L | GF | GA | GD | Pts | Qualification or relegation |
|---|---|---|---|---|---|---|---|---|---|---|
| 4 | Chelsea | 38 | 20 | 9 | 9 | 64 | 43 | +21 | 69 | Qualification for the Champions League league phase (Note: The Premier League gained an additional Champions League place as a result of England gaining one of the two European Performance Spots (EPS) awarded to the two associations with the highest UEFA coefficient points in 2024–25.) |
| 5 | Newcastle United | 38 | 20 | 6 | 12 | 68 | 47 | +21 | 66 | Qualification for the Champions League league phase |
| 6 | Aston Villa | 38 | 19 | 9 | 10 | 58 | 51 | +7 | 66 | Qualification for the Europa League league phase (Note: Initially, Crystal Palace qualified for the Europa League league phase as the 2024–25 FA Cup winners. However, due to multi-club ownership rules, they were not permitted to enter the Europa League and entered the Conference League play-off round instead, with 7th-placed Nottingham Forest taking their place in the Europa League. Crystal Palace appealed the decision but this was ultimately rejected.) |
| 7 | Nottingham Forest | 38 | 19 | 8 | 11 | 58 | 46 | +12 | 65 | Qualification for the Europa League league phase |
| 8 | Brighton & Hove Albion | 38 | 16 | 13 | 9 | 66 | 59 | +7 | 61 | |

Source: Premier League
Rules for classification: 1) Points; 2) Goal difference; 3) Goals scored; 4) If the champions, relegated teams or qualified teams for UEFA competitions cannot be determined by rules 1 to 3, rules 4.1 to 4.3 are applied – 4.1) Points gained in head-to-head record between such teams; 4.2) Away goals scored in head-to-head record between such teams; 4.3) Play-offs

==== Results summary ====
| Overall | | | | | | | | Home | | | | | | Away | | | | | |
| Pld | W | D | L | GF | GA | GD | Pts | W | D | L | GF | GA | GD | W | D | L | GF | GA | GD |
|---|---|---|---|---|---|---|---|---|---|---|---|---|---|---|---|---|---|---|---|
| 38 | 19 | 9 | 10 | 58 | 51 | +7 | 66 | 11 | 7 | 1 | 34 | 20 | +14 | 8 | 2 | 9 | 24 | 31 | −7 |

Source: Soccerway

==== Results by round ====
| Round | 1 | 2 | 3 | 4 | 5 | 6 | 7 | 8 | 9 | 10 | 11 | 12 | 13 | 14 | 15 | 16 | 17 | 18 | 19 | 20 | 21 | 22 | 23 | 24 | 25 | 29^{1} | 26 | 27 | 28 | 30 | 31 | 32 | 33 | 34 | 35 | 36 | 37 | 38 |
|---|---|---|---|---|---|---|---|---|---|---|---|---|---|---|---|---|---|---|---|---|---|---|---|---|---|---|---|---|---|---|---|---|---|---|---|---|---|---|
| Ground | A | H | A | H | H | A | H | A | H | A | A | H | A | H | H | A | H | A | H | H | A | A | H | A | H | H | H | A | A | A | H | A | H | A | H | A | H | A |
| Result | W | L | W | W | W | D | D | W | D | L | L | D | L | W | W | L | W | L | D | W | W | D | D | L | D | D | W | L | W | W | W | W | W | L | W | W | W | L |
| Position | 5 | 12 | 7 | 5 | 3 | 5 | 5 | 4 | 4 | 6 | 9 | 8 | 12 | 8 | 6 | 7 | 6 | 9 | 9 | 8 | 7 | 8 | 8 | 8 | 9 | 9 | 8 | 10 | 8 | 7 | 7 | 7 | 7 | 7 | 7 | 6 | 6 | 6 |
| Points | 3 | 3 | 6 | 9 | 12 | 13 | 14 | 17 | 18 | 18 | 18 | 19 | 19 | 22 | 25 | 25 | 28 | 28 | 29 | 32 | 35 | 36 | 37 | 37 | 38 | 39 | 42 | 42 | 45 | 48 | 51 | 54 | 57 | 57 | 60 | 63 | 66 | 66 |

Source: Soccerway
A = Away; H = Home; W = Win; D = Draw; L = Loss
Notes:
- ^{1} Matchday 29 (v. Liverpool) was moved forward due to Liverpool's involvement in the EFL Cup final.

==== Matches ====
On 18 June, the Premier League fixtures were released.

Win Draw Loss Fixtures

| 17 August 2024 1 | West Ham United | 1–2 | Aston Villa | Stratford |
| 17:30 BST | Paquetá (yellow card) 31', (goal) 37' (pen.) | Report | Onana 4'; Bailey (yellow card) 8'; Durán 79'; Philogene (yellow card) 90' | Stadium: London Stadium; Attendance: 62,463 (3,001 away fans); Referee: Tony Harrington |

| 24 August 2024 2 | Aston Villa | 0–2 | Arsenal | Birmingham |
| 17:30 BST | Onana (yellow card) 72' | Report | Rice (yellow card) 45+3'; Gabriel (yellow card) 57'; Trossard 67'; Partey 77'; Ødegaard (yellow card) 89' | Stadium: Villa Park; Attendance: 41,587 (3,006 away); Referee: Michael Oliver |
Note: Fixture was initially scheduled for a 15:00 kick-off, but was moved for live Sky Sports broadcast.

| 31 August 2024 3 | Leicester City | 1–2 | Aston Villa | Leicester |
| 15:00 BST | Skipp (yellow card) 26'; Buonanotte 73'; Okoli (yellow card) 74'; Vardy (yellow card) 83'; Winks (yellow card) 90+3' | Report | Onana (yellow card) 8', (goal) 28'; Tielemans (yellow card) 40'; Bogarde (yellow card) 55'; Durán 63', (yellow card) 90+2'; McGinn (yellow card) 74' | Stadium: King Power Stadium; Attendance: 31,725 (3,292 away fans); Referee: David Coote |

| 14 September 2024 4 | Aston Villa | 3–2 | Everton | Birmingham |
| 17:30 BST | Watkins 36', 58'; Martínez (yellow card) 47'; Durán 76' | Report | Ndiaye (yellow card) 15'; McNeil 16'; Iroegbunam (yellow card) 19'; Calvert-Lewin 27'; Young (yellow card) 79'; O'Brien (yellow card) 88' | Stadium: Villa Park; Attendance: 41,920 (3,006 away); Referee: Craig Pawson |
Note: Fixture was initially scheduled for a 15:00 kick-off, but was moved for live Sky Sports broadcast.

| 21 September 2024 5 | Aston Villa | 3–1 | Wolverhampton Wanderers | Birmingham |
| 15:00 BST | Torres (yellow card) 28'; Watkins 73'; Rogers (yellow card) 74'; Konsa 88'; Durán 90+4'; Barkley (yellow card) 90+11' | Report | Aït-Nouri (yellow card) 7'; Semedo (yellow card) 16'; Cunha 25', (yellow card) 90+12'; João Gomes (yellow card) 27'; Lemina (yellow card) 61'; Mosquera (yellow card) 81' | Stadium: Villa Park; Attendance: 39,978 (2,946 away); Referee: Tim Robinson |

| 29 September 2024 6 | Ipswich Town | 2–2 | Aston Villa | Ipswich |
| 14:00 BST | Delap 8', 72', (yellow card) 45+2'; Morsy (yellow card) 45+2'; Tuanzebe (yellow card) 54'; Greaves (yellow card) 74' | Report | Rogers 15'; Watkins 32'; Digne (yellow card) 46' | Stadium: Portman Road; Attendance: 29,943 (3,000 away); Referee: Stuart Attwell |
Note: Fixture was initially scheduled for 28 September, but was moved for live Sky Sports broadcast.

| 6 October 2024 7 | Aston Villa | 0–0 | Manchester United | Birmingham |
| 14:00 BST | Barkley (yellow card) 90+4' | Report | Eriksen (yellow card) 3'; Maguire (yellow card) 36'; Mainoo (yellow card) 41'; Rashford (yellow card) 59'; Lindelöf (yellow card) 87' | Stadium: Villa Park; Attendance: 42,682; Referee: Robert Jones |
Note: Fixture was initially scheduled for 5 October, but was moved for live Sky Sports broadcast.

| 19 October 2024 8 | Fulham | 1–3 | Aston Villa | Fulham |
| 15:00 BST | Jiménez 5'; Pereira (penalty missed) 27'; Bassey (yellow card) 57'; Andersen (red card) 64'; Smith Rowe (yellow card) 65'; Robinson (yellow card) 71'; Diop (yellow card) 90+8' | Report | Rogers 9', (yellow card) 70'; Bailey (yellow card) 33'; Watkins 59'; Diop 69' (o.g.); Digne (yellow card) 83'; Philogene (yellow card) 88' (yellow-red card) 90+3' | Stadium: Craven Cottage; Attendance: 26,743 (2,701 away); Referee: Darren England |

| 26 October 2024 9 | Aston Villa | 1–1 | Bournemouth | Birmingham |
| 15:00 BST | Onana (yellow card) 4'; Tielemans (yellow card) 18'; Ramsey (yellow card) 41'; McGinn (yellow card) 55'; Digne (yellow card) 58'; Barkley 76', (yellow card) 90+6'; Cash (yellow card) 90+4' | Report | Kluivert (yellow card) 10'; Araujo (yellow card) 21'; Smith (yellow card) 39'; Ünal (yellow card) 45+1'; Semenyo (yellow card) 80'; Tavernier (yellow card) 90'; Evanilson 90+6' | Stadium: Villa Park; Attendance: 42,165 (1,599 away); Referee: Chris Kavanagh |

| 3 November 2024 10 | Tottenham Hotspur | 4–1 | Aston Villa | Tottenham |
| 14:00 GMT | Johnson 49'; Porro (yellow card) 54'; Romero (yellow card) 58'; Solanke 75', 79'; Maddison 90+6' | Report | Rogers 32' | Stadium: Tottenham Hotspur Stadium; Attendance: 61,253 (3,038 away); Referee: Craig Pawson |
Note: Fixture was originally scheduled for 2 November at 15:00, but was moved for Sky Sports broadcast.

| 9 November 2024 11 | Liverpool | 2–0 | Aston Villa | Liverpool |
| 20:00 GMT | Núñez 20'; Salah 84' | Report | Rogers (yellow card) 34'; Tielemans (yellow card) 45+3'; Kamara (yellow card) 76' | Stadium: Anfield; Attendance: 60,292 (3,051 away); Referee: David Coote |
Note: Fixture was originally scheduled for 15:00, but was moved for TNT Sports broadcast.

| 23 November 2024 12 | Aston Villa | 2–2 | Crystal Palace | Birmingham |
| 15:00 GMT | Watkins 36'; Tielemans (penalty missed) 45'; Diego Carlos (yellow card) 59'; Maatsen (yellow card) 66'; Barkley 77'; Buendía (yellow card) 85' | Report | Sarr 4'; Devenny 45+1'; Chalobah (yellow card) 77'; Mitchell (yellow card) 87' | Stadium: Villa Park; Attendance: 42,175 (1,712 away); Referee: Tim Robinson |

| 1 December 2024 13 | Chelsea | 3–0 | Aston Villa | Fulham |
| 13:30 GMT | Jackson 7'; Fernández 36'; Palmer 83'; Madueke (yellow card) 85'; Félix (yellow card) 89' | Report | Philogene (yellow card) 54'; Cash (yellow card) 61' | Stadium: Stamford Bridge; Attendance: 39,689 (3,065 away); Referee: Stuart Attwell |
Note: Fixture was originally scheduled for 30 November at 15:00, but was moved for Sky Sports broadcast.

| 4 December 2024 14 | Aston Villa | 3–1 | Brentford | Birmingham |
| 20:15 GMT | Rogers 21'; Watkins 28' (pen.); Cash 34', (yellow card) 82'; Durán (yellow card) 65' | Report | Pinnock (yellow card) 25'; Collins (yellow card) 49'; Damsgaard 54' | Stadium: Villa Park; Attendance: 37,890 (1,188 away); Referee: Lewis Smith |
Note: Fixture was originally scheduled for 3 December at 19:45, but was moved for Amazon Prime Video broadcast.

| 7 December 2024 15 | Aston Villa | 1–0 | Southampton | Birmingham |
| 15:00 GMT | Durán 24'; Rogers (yellow card) 90+6' | Report | Downes (yellow card) 69'; Wood (yellow card) 78'; Amo-Ameyaw (yellow card) 85' | Stadium: Villa Park; Attendance: 42,453 (3,006 away); Referee: Darren Bond |

| 14 December 2024 16 | Nottingham Forest | 2–1 | Aston Villa | West Bridgford |
| 17:30 GMT | Milenković 87'; Elanga 90+3' | Report | Durán 63', (yellow card) 70' | Stadium: City Ground; Attendance: 30,117 (2,932 away); Referee: Sam Barrott |
Note: Fixture was originally scheduled for 15:00, but was moved for Sky Sports broadcast.

| 21 December 2024 17 | Aston Villa | 2–1 | Manchester City | Birmingham |
| 12:30 GMT | Durán 16'; Cash (yellow card) 37'; Martínez (yellow card) 45+2'; Rogers 65'; McGinn (yellow card) 90+4' | Report | Lewis (yellow card) 47'; Gvardiol (yellow card) 84'; Grealish (yellow card) 87'; Foden 90+3' | Stadium: Villa Park; Attendance: 42,345 (3,006 away); Referee: Peter Bankes |
Note: Fixture was originally scheduled for 15:00, but was moved for TNT Sports broadcast.

| 26 December 2024 18 | Newcastle United | 3–0 | Aston Villa | Newcastle upon Tyne |
| 15:00 GMT | Gordon 2'; Trippier (yellow card) 23'; Joelinton (yellow card) 45', (goal) 90+1'; Isak 59' | Report | Cash (yellow card) 14'; Durán (red card) 32' | Stadium: St James' Park; Attendance: 52,168 (3,204 away); Referee: Anthony Taylor |
Note: Live on Amazon Prime Video.

| 30 December 2024 19 | Aston Villa | 2–2 | Brighton & Hove Albion | Birmingham |
| 19:45 GMT | Watkins 36' (pen.); Rogers (yellow card) 38', (goal) 47'; Mings (yellow card) 45+3' | Report | Adingra 12'; Ayari (yellow card) 45+7'; Baleba (yellow card) 72'; Lamptey 81'; Igor (yellow card) 90+2' | Stadium: Villa Park; Attendance: 41,414 (2,906 away); Referee: Craig Pawson |
Note: Fixture was originally scheduled for 29 December at 15:00, but was rescheduled due to another Brighton fixture being moved for TV broadcast.

| 4 January 2025 20 | Aston Villa | 2–1 | Leicester City | Birmingham |
| 15:00 GMT | Barkley 58'; Bailey 76' | Report | Mavididi 63'; Soumaré (yellow card) 90+5' | Stadium: Villa Park; Attendance: 42,386 (3,006 away); Referee: Jarred Gillett |

| 15 January 2025 21 | Everton | 0–1 | Aston Villa | Liverpool |
| 19:30 GMT | Gueye (yellow card) 52'; Pickford (yellow card) 54' | Report | Onana (yellow card) 8'; Watkins 51' | Stadium: Goodison Park; Attendance: 39,085 (2,976 away); Referee: Sam Barrott |
Note: Fixture was originally scheduled for 14 January at 19:45, but was moved for TNT Sports broadcast.

| 18 January 2025 22 | Arsenal | 2–2 | Aston Villa | Holloway |
| 17:30 GMT | Martinelli 35'; Havertz 55'; Trossard (yellow card) 67'; Sterling (yellow card) 90+4' | Report | Maatsen (yellow card) 20'; Tielemans 60'; Watkins 68'; Kamara (yellow card) 78'; Rogers (yellow card) 90+5' | Stadium: Emirates Stadium; Attendance: 60,067 (3,003 away); Referee: Chris Kavanagh |
Note: Fixture was originally scheduled for 15:00, but was moved for live Sky Sports broadcast.

| 26 January 2025 23 | Aston Villa | 1–1 | West Ham United | Birmingham |
| 16:30 GMT | Ramsey 8'; Tielemans (yellow card) 45+5'; Rogers (yellow card) 64' | Report | Cresswell (yellow card) 45+5'; Souček (yellow card) 63'; Álvarez (yellow card) 68'; Emerson 70' | Stadium: Villa Park; Attendance: 41,628 (3,006 away); Referee: Peter Bankes |
Note: Fixture was originally scheduled for 25 January at 15:00, but was moved for Sky Sports broadcast.

| 1 February 2025 24 | Wolverhampton Wanderers | 2–0 | Aston Villa | Wolverhampton |
| 17:30 GMT | Bellegarde 12'; Sarabia (yellow card) 34'; Cunha 90+7', (yellow card) 90+7' | Report | McGinn (yellow card) 16'; Rogers (yellow card) 30'; Bogarde (yellow card) 45+2' | Stadium: Molineux Stadium; Attendance: 31,385 (2,966 away); Referee: Andrew Madley |
Note: Fixture was originally scheduled for 15:00, but was moved for Sky Sports broadcasting.

| 15 February 2025 25 | Aston Villa | 1–1 | Ipswich Town | Birmingham |
| 15:00 GMT | Watkins 69' | Report | Tuanzebe (yellow card) 28' (yellow-red card) 40'; Greaves (yellow card) 53'; Delap 56'; Phillips (yellow card) 68'; Hutchinson (yellow card) 90+5' | Stadium: Villa Park; Attendance: 42,510 (3,000 away); Referee: Robert Jones |

| 19 February 2025 29 | Aston Villa | 2–2 | Liverpool | Birmingham |
| 19:30 GMT | Disasi (yellow card) 23'; Tielemans 38'; Watkins 45+3' | Report | Salah 29'; Alexander-Arnold 61' | Stadium: Villa Park; Attendance: 41,910 (3,006 away); Referee: Craig Pawson |
Note: Fixture was originally scheduled for 15 March 2025 at 15:00, but was moved to 17:30 on that date for TNT Sports broadcasting, but later moved forward due to Liverpool's participation in the EFL Cup final.

| 22 February 2025 26 | Aston Villa | 2–1 | Chelsea | Birmingham |
| 17:30 GMT | Asensio 57', 89'; McGinn (yellow card) 69' | Report | Fernández 9', (yellow card) 56'; Nkunku (yellow card) 72'; Caicedo (yellow card) 89' | Stadium: Villa Park; Attendance: 42,423 (3,006 away); Referee: Michael Oliver |
Note: Fixture was originally scheduled for 15:00, but was moved for Sky Sports broadcasting.

| 25 February 2025 27 | Crystal Palace | 4–1 | Aston Villa | Selhurst |
| 19:30 GMT | Sarr 29', 71'; Hughes (yellow card) 35'; Muñoz (yellow card) 45+2'; Mateta 59'; Lerma (yellow card) 87'; Nketiah 90+1' | Report | Rogers 52'; Bailey (yellow card) 82' | Stadium: Selhurst Park; Attendance: 24,712 (2,687 away); Referee: Sam Barrott |
Note: Fixture was initially scheduled for a 20:00 kick-off, but was moved for live TNT Sports broadcasting.

| 8 March 2025 28 | Brentford | 0–1 | Aston Villa | Brentford |
| 17:30 GMT | Ajer (yellow card) 67'; Collins (yellow card) 90+6' | Report | McGinn (yellow card) 42'; Watkins 49'; Cash (yellow card) 81' | Stadium: Brentford Community Stadium; Attendance: 17,171 (1,725 away); Referee: Jarred Gillett |
Note: Fixture was originally scheduled for 15:00, but was moved for Sky Sports broadcasting.

| 2 April 2025 30 | Brighton & Hove Albion | 0–3 | Aston Villa | Brighton and Hove |
| 19:45 BST | Hinshelwood (yellow card) 20'; Welbeck (yellow card) 90+11' | Report | Rashford 51'; Asensio 78'; Martínez (yellow card) 90'; Disasi (yellow card) 90+1'; Watkins (yellow card) 90+2'; Malen 90+10' | Stadium: Falmer Stadium; Attendance: 31,230 (3,104 away); Referee: Stuart Attwell |
Note: Fixture was originally scheduled for 1 April, but was moved due to FA Cup involvements on the preceding Sunday.

| 5 April 2025 31 | Aston Villa | 2–1 | Nottingham Forest | Birmingham |
| 17:30 BST | Rogers 13'; Malen 15'; Asensio (yellow card) 51'; Martínez (yellow card) 86' | Report | Morato (yellow card) 49'; Silva 57', (yellow card) 73' | Stadium: Villa Park; Attendance: 42,743 (3,006 away); Referee: Simon Hooper |
Note: Fixture was originally scheduled for 15:00, but was moved for Sky Sports broadcasting.

| 12 April 2025 32 | Southampton | 0–3 | Aston Villa | Southampton |
| 15:00 BST | Fernandes (yellow card) 38'; Bednarek (yellow card) 68'; Harwood-Bellis (yellow card) 88' | Report | Asensio (penalty missed) 69', 90+4'; Watkins 73'; Malen 79'; McGinn (yellow card) 87', (goal) 90+4' | Stadium: St Mary's Stadium; Attendance: 30,673 (3,008 away); Referee: Thomas Bramall |

| 19 April 2025 33 | Aston Villa | 4–1 | Newcastle United | Birmingham |
| 17:30 BST | Watkins 1'; Maatsen 64'; Burn 73' (o.g.); Onana 75'; Ramsey (yellow card) 88' | Report | Schär (yellow card) 13', (goal) 18'; Joelinton (yellow card) 41'; Bruno Guimarães (yellow card) 63' | Stadium: Villa Park; Attendance: 42,618 (3,000 away); Referee: Jarred Gillett |
Note: Fixture was originally scheduled for 15:00, but was moved for Sky Sports broadcasting.

| 22 April 2025 34 | Manchester City | 2–1 | Aston Villa | Manchester |
| 20:00 BST | Silva 7', (yellow card) 86'; Gvardiol (yellow card) 70'; Nunes (yellow card) 77', (goal) 90+4' | Report | Rashford 18' (pen.); Digne (yellow card) 35'; Rogers (yellow card) 50'; Watkins (yellow card) 85' | Stadium: Etihad Stadium; Attendance: 52,192 (3,065 away); Referee: Craig Pawson |
Note: Fixture was originally scheduled for 15:00 on 26 April, but was moved for Sky Sports broadcasting. Fixture was moved once again due to both teams' participation in the FA Cup semi-finals.

| 3 May 2025 35 | Aston Villa | 1–0 | Fulham | Birmingham |
| 12:30 BST | Tielemans 12' | Report | Sessegnon (yellow card) 31'; Tete (yellow card) 52'; Bassey (yellow card) 59'; Berge (yellow card) 66'; Traoré (yellow card) 90+9' | Stadium: Villa Park; Attendance: 42,515 (1,599 away); Referee: Robert Jones |
Note: Fixture was originally scheduled for 15:00, but was moved for Sky Sports broadcasting.

| 10 May 2025 36 | Bournemouth | 0–1 | Aston Villa | Bournemouth |
| 17:30 BST | Scott (yellow card) 27'; Smith (yellow card) 45+4'; Zabarnyi (yellow card) 78'; Huijsen (yellow card) 83' | Report | Asensio (yellow card) 28'; Martínez (yellow card) 45+5'; Ramsey (yellow card) 45+5' (yellow-red card) 80'; Watkins 45+6'; Konsa (yellow card) 90+1' | Stadium: Dean Court; Attendance: 11,248 (1,307 away); Referee: Stuart Attwell |
Note: Fixture was originally scheduled for 15:00, but was moved for Sky Sports broadcasting.

| 16 May 2025 37 | Aston Villa | 2–0 | Tottenham Hotspur | Birmingham |
| 19:30 BST | Cash (yellow card) 23'; Konsa 59'; Kamara 73' | Report | Gray (yellow card) 33'; Tel (yellow card) 62' | Stadium: Villa Park; Attendance: 42,239 (2,533 away); Referee: Peter Bankes |
Note: Fixture was originally scheduled for 15:00 on 18 May, but was moved due to Tottenham's participation in the UEFA Europa League.

| 25 May 2025 38 | Manchester United | 2–0 | Aston Villa | Trafford |
| 16:00 BST | Amad (yellow card) 45+1', (goal) 76'; Eriksen 87' (pen.); Casemiro (yellow card) 90+4' | Report | Martínez (red card) 45+1'; Torres (yellow card) 73'; Rogers (yellow card) 80' | Stadium: Old Trafford; Attendance: 73,839; Referee: Thomas Bramall |
Note: Live on TNT Sports.

=== FA Cup ===
Aston Villa entered the FA Cup in the third round, which was drawn on 2 December 2024. The fourth round was drawn on 12 January 2025. The fifth round was drawn on 10 February 2025. The quarter-finals draw was on 2 March 2025.

Win Draw Loss Fixtures

| 10 January 2025 Third round | Aston Villa | 2–1 | West Ham United | Birmingham |
| 20:00 GMT | Rogers (yellow card) 57', (goal) 76'; Onana 71' | Report | Paquetá 9'; Kudus (yellow card) 29' | Stadium: Villa Park; Attendance: 40,989; Referee: Tim Robinson |

| 9 February 2025 Fourth round | Aston Villa | 2–1 | Tottenham Hotspur | Birmingham |
| 17:35 GMT | Ramsey 1'; Rogers 64' | Report | Bentancur (yellow card) 60'; Bergvall (yellow card) 62'; Porro (yellow card) 80'; Tel 90+1' | Stadium: Villa Park; Attendance: 40,773; Referee: Anthony Taylor |

| 28 February 2025 Fifth round | Aston Villa | 2–0 | Cardiff City | Birmingham |
| 20:00 GMT | Asensio 68', 80' | Report | | Stadium: Villa Park; Attendance: 40,175; Referee: Peter Bankes |

| 30 March 2025 Quarter-finals | Preston North End | 0–3 | Aston Villa | Preston |
| 13:30 GMT | Keane (yellow card) 28'; Whiteman (yellow card) 67' | Report | Rashford 58', 63' (pen.); Ramsey 71' | Stadium: Deepdale; Attendance: 22,198; Referee: Chris Kavanagh |

| 26 April 2025 Semi-finals | Crystal Palace | 3–0 | Aston Villa | Wembley |
| 17:15 BST | Mitchell (yellow card) 19'; Eze 31'; Mateta (penalty missed) 53'; Sarr 58', 90+4'; Richards (yellow card) 65'; Kamada (yellow card) 84' | Report | Kamara (yellow card) 17' | Stadium: Wembley Stadium; Attendance: 82,301; Referee: Anthony Taylor |
Note: Live on BBC One.

=== EFL Cup ===
Aston Villa entered the EFL Cup in the third round, which was drawn on 28 August 2024. The fourth round was drawn on 25 September 2024.

Win Draw Loss Fixtures

| 24 September 2024 Third round | Wycombe Wanderers | 1–2 | Aston Villa | High Wycombe |
| 20:00 BST | Bakinson (yellow card) 53'; Kone 90+5' | Report | Buendía 55'; Durán 85' (pen.) | Stadium: Adams Park; Attendance: 8,158; Referee: John Busby |
Note: Originally scheduled for 19:30, however was moved to 20:00 for Sky Sports broadcast.

| 30 October 2024 Fourth round | Aston Villa | 1–2 | Crystal Palace | Birmingham |
| 19:45 BST | Durán 23'; Diego Carlos (yellow card) 67'; Mings (yellow card) 89' | Report | Eze 8'; Kamada 64'; Mateta (yellow card) 76'; Hughes (yellow card) 78'; Muñoz (yellow card) 90+1'; Guéhi (yellow card) 90+4' | Stadium: Villa Park; Attendance: 34,851; Referee: Sam Barrott |

=== UEFA Champions League ===
Win Draw Loss Fixtures

==== League phase ====
The draw for the league phase was held on 29 August 2024. Aston Villa were drawn to play Bayern Munich, Juventus, Celtic, and Bologna at Villa Park, and RB Leipzig, Club Brugge, Young Boys, and Monaco away from home.

| Pos | Team | Pld | W | D | L | GF | GA | GD | Pts | Qualification |
|---|---|---|---|---|---|---|---|---|---|---|
| 6 | (German Football Association) Bayer Leverkusen | 8 | 5 | 1 | 2 | 15 | 7 | +8 | 16 | Advance to round of 16 (seeded) |
| 7 | (French Football Federation) Lille | 8 | 5 | 1 | 2 | 17 | 10 | +7 | 16 | Advance to round of 16 (seeded) |
| 8 | (The Football Association) Aston Villa | 8 | 5 | 1 | 2 | 13 | 6 | +7 | 16 | Advance to round of 16 (seeded) |
| 9 | (Italian Football Federation) Atalanta | 8 | 4 | 3 | 1 | 20 | 6 | +14 | 15 | Advance to knockout phase play-offs (seeded) |
| 10 | (German Football Association) Borussia Dortmund | 8 | 5 | 0 | 3 | 22 | 12 | +10 | 15 | Advance to knockout phase play-offs (seeded) |

Source: UEFA
Rules for classification: League phase tiebreakers

| Round | 1 | 2 | 3 | 4 | 5 | 6 | 7 | 8 |
|---|---|---|---|---|---|---|---|---|
| Ground | A | H | H | A | H | A | A | H |
| Result | W | W | W | L | D | W | L | W |
| Position | 4 | 6 | 1 | 8 | 9 | 5 | 9 | 8 |
| Points | 3 | 6 | 9 | 9 | 10 | 13 | 13 | 16 |

Source: UEFA
A = Away; H = Home; W = Win; D = Draw; L = Loss

| 17 September 2024 1 | Young Boys (Switzerland) | 0–3 | (England) Aston Villa | Bern, Switzerland |
| 18:45 CEST | Niasse (yellow card) 33'; Lauper (yellow card) 46'; Elia (yellow card) 53'; Monteiro (yellow card) 78' | Report | Tielemans 27'; Ramsey 38'; Durán (yellow card) 79'; Onana 86' | Stadium: Stadion Wankdorf; Attendance: 31,500; Referee: Georgi Kabakov (Bulgaria) |

| 2 October 2024 2 | Aston Villa (England) | 1–0 | (Germany) Bayern Munich | Birmingham, England |
| 20:00 BST | Durán 79', (yellow card) 90+5'; Maatsen (yellow card) 90+1'; Diego Carlos (yellow card) 90+4' | Report | Upamecano (yellow card) 21'; Gnabry (yellow card) 66' | Stadium: Villa Park; Attendance: 38,991; Referee: Radu Petrescu (Romania) |

| 22 October 2024 3 | Aston Villa (England) | 2–0 | (Italy) Bologna | Birmingham, England |
| 20:00 BST | Barkley (yellow card) 50'; McGinn 55'; Durán 64' | Report | Orsolini (yellow card) 19'; Posch (yellow card) 45'; Lykogiannis (yellow card) 47'; Freuler (yellow card) 53' | Stadium: Villa Park; Attendance: 41,847; Referee: João Pinheiro (Portugal) |

| 6 November 2024 4 | Club Brugge (Belgium) | 1–0 | (England) Aston Villa | Bruges, Belgium |
| 18:45 CET | Nielsen (yellow card) 17'; Vanaken 52' (pen.); Vetlesen (yellow card) 78' | Report | Mings (yellow card) 25'; Diego Carlos (yellow card) 25'; Kamara (yellow card) 90+1'; Konsa (yellow card) 90+5' | Stadium: Jan Breydel Stadium; Attendance: 23,466; Referee: Tobias Stieler (Germany) |

| 27 November 2024 5 | Aston Villa (England) | 0–0 | (Italy) Juventus | Birmingham, England |
| 20:00 GMT | Tielemans (yellow card) 10'; Bailey (yellow card) 12'; Torres (yellow card) 39' | Report | Kalulu (yellow card) 45'; Weah (yellow card) 78'; Koopmeiners (yellow card) 90+3' | Stadium: Villa Park; Attendance: 42,589; Referee: Jesús Gil Manzano (Spain) |

| 10 December 2024 6 | RB Leipzig (Germany) | 2–3 | (England) Aston Villa | Leipzig, Germany |
| 21:00 CET | Openda 27'; Baumgartner 62'; Henrichs (yellow card) 81' | Report | McGinn 3'; Digne (yellow card) 45'; Durán 52'; Diego Carlos (yellow card) 79'; Barkley 85' | Stadium: Red Bull Arena; Attendance: 40,402; Referee: Maurizio Mariani (Italy) |

| 21 January 2025 7 | Monaco (France) | 1–0 | (England) Aston Villa | Fontvieille, Monaco |
| 18:45 CET | Singo 8'; Golovin (yellow card) 90+2' | Report | Digne (yellow card) 49'; Rogers (yellow card) 82'; Kamara (yellow card) 90+2' | Stadium: Stade Louis II; Attendance: 13,508; Referee: Slavko Vinčić (Slovenia) |

| 29 January 2025 8 | Aston Villa (England) | 4–2 | (Scotland) Celtic | Birmingham, England |
| 20:00 GMT | Rogers 3', 5', 90+1'; Watkins 60', (penalty missed) 67' | Report | Idah 36', 38' | Stadium: Villa Park; Attendance: 42,824; Referee: Clément Turpin (France) |

==== Knockout phase ====
===== Round of 16 =====
The draw for the round of 16 was held on 21 February 2025, with Aston Villa being drawn against Belgian Pro League side Club Brugge.

| 4 March 2025 First leg | Club Brugge (Belgium) | 1–3 | (England) Aston Villa | Bruges, Belgium |
| 18:45 CET | De Cuyper 12' | Report | Bailey 3'; Mechele 82' (o.g.); Asensio 88' (pen.) | Stadium: Jan Breydel Stadium; Attendance: 26,890; Referee: João Pinheiro (Portugal) |

| 12 March 2025 Second leg | Aston Villa (England) | 3–0 (6–1 agg.) | (Belgium) Club Brugge | Birmingham, England |
| 20:00 GMT | Asensio 50', 61'; Maatsen 57' | Report | Sabbe (red card) 17'; Vanaken (yellow card) 70' | Stadium: Villa Park; Attendance: 42,461; Referee: Daniel Siebert (Germany) |

===== Quarter-finals =====
The draw for the order of the quarter-final legs was held on 21 February 2025, after the draw for the round of 16.

| 9 April 2025 First leg | Paris Saint-Germain (France) | 3–1 | (England) Aston Villa | Paris, France |
| 18:45 CEST | Doué 39'; Kvaratskhelia 49'; Mendes 90+2' | Report | Cash (yellow card) 17'; Rogers 35' | Stadium: Parc des Princes; Attendance: 47,681; Referee: Maurizio Mariani (Italy) |

| 15 April 2025 Second leg | Aston Villa (England) | 3–2 (4–5 agg.) | (France) Paris Saint-Germain | Birmingham, England |
| 20:00 BST | Tielemans 34'; McGinn (yellow card) 42', (goal) 55'; Konsa 57' | Report | Hakimi 11'; Mendes 27' | Stadium: Villa Park; Attendance: 42,535; Referee: José María Sánchez Martínez (Spain) |

== Squad statistics ==
=== Appearances ===
As of match played 25 May 2025

Players with no appearances are not included on the list

| No. | Pos. | Nat. | Player | Premier League | | FA Cup | | EFL Cup | | Champions League | | Total | |
| No. | Pos. | Nat. | Player | Apps | Starts | Apps | Starts | Apps | Starts | Apps | Starts | Apps | Starts |
|---|---|---|---|---|---|---|---|---|---|---|---|---|---|
| 2 | DF | (Poland) | Matty Cash | 27 | 24 | 3 | 3 | 0 | 0 | 8 | 7 | 38 | 34 |
| 3 | DF | (France) | Axel Disasi | 7 | 5 | 0 | 0 | 0 | 0 | 3 | 1 | 10 | 6 |
| 4 | DF | (England) | Ezri Konsa | 34 | 33 | 5 | 5 | 0 | 0 | 11 | 11 | 50 | 49 |
| 5 | DF | (England) | Tyrone Mings | 14 | 12 | 2 | 2 | 1 | 1 | 4 | 4 | 21 | 19 |
| 6 | MF | (England) | Ross Barkley | 20 | 3 | 2 | 1 | 1 | 1 | 6 | 0 | 29 | 5 |
| 7 | MF | (Scotland) | John McGinn | 34 | 27 | 4 | 3 | 1 | 1 | 10 | 9 | 49 | 40 |
| 8 | MF | (Belgium) | Youri Tielemans | 36 | 35 | 5 | 5 | 0 | 0 | 12 | 12 | 53 | 52 |
| 9 | FW | (England) | Marcus Rashford | 10 | 4 | 3 | 2 | 0 | 0 | 4 | 4 | 17 | 10 |
| 11 | FW | (England) | Ollie Watkins | 38 | 32 | 4 | 3 | 0 | 0 | 12 | 9 | 54 | 44 |
| 12 | DF | (France) | Lucas Digne | 32 | 28 | 4 | 3 | 0 | 0 | 9 | 9 | 45 | 40 |
| 14 | DF | (Spain) | Pau Torres | 24 | 23 | 1 | 1 | 0 | 0 | 9 | 7 | 34 | 31 |
| 16 | DF | (Spain) | Andrés García | 7 | 5 | 3 | 2 | 0 | 0 | 0 | 0 | 10 | 7 |
| 17 | FW | (Netherlands) | Donyell Malen | 14 | 2 | 3 | 1 | 0 | 0 | 0 | 0 | 17 | 3 |
| 21 | FW | (Spain) | Marco Asensio | 13 | 9 | 4 | 3 | 0 | 0 | 4 | 0 | 21 | 12 |
| 22 | DF | (Netherlands) | Ian Maatsen | 29 | 10 | 4 | 2 | 2 | 2 | 10 | 3 | 45 | 17 |
| 23 | GK | (Argentina) | Emiliano Martínez | 37 | 37 | 4 | 4 | 0 | 0 | 12 | 12 | 53 | 53 |
| 24 | MF | (Belgium) | Amadou Onana | 26 | 20 | 2 | 0 | 1 | 1 | 5 | 4 | 34 | 25 |
| 25 | GK | (Sweden) | Robin Olsen | 4 | 1 | 1 | 1 | 0 | 0 | 0 | 0 | 5 | 2 |
| 26 | DF | (Netherlands) | Lamare Bogarde | 8 | 5 | 2 | 1 | 2 | 1 | 4 | 2 | 16 | 9 |
| 27 | FW | (England) | Morgan Rogers | 37 | 37 | 5 | 4 | 0 | 0 | 12 | 12 | 54 | 53 |
| 31 | FW | (Jamaica) | Leon Bailey | 24 | 14 | 4 | 3 | 2 | 2 | 8 | 6 | 38 | 25 |
| 41 | MF | (England) | Jacob Ramsey | 29 | 19 | 5 | 2 | 1 | 0 | 10 | 4 | 45 | 25 |
| 44 | MF | (France) | Boubacar Kamara | 26 | 20 | 4 | 4 | 1 | 1 | 10 | 8 | 41 | 33 |
| 54 | MF | (Scotland) | Aidan Borland | 0 | 0 | 0 | 0 | 1 | 0 | 0 | 0 | 1 | 0 |
| 56 | MF | (England) | Jamaldeen Jimoh-Aloba | 0 | 0 | 1 | 0 | 2 | 0 | 0 | 0 | 3 | 0 |
| 79 | MF | (England) | Ben Broggio | 0 | 0 | 0 | 0 | 1 | 0 | 0 | 0 | 1 | 0 |
Player(s) who featured but departed the club on loan during the season:
| 10 | MF | (Argentina) | Emiliano Buendía | 12 | 0 | 1 | 0 | 2 | 2 | 4 | 1 | 19 | 3 |
| 18 | GK | (Australia) | Joe Gauci | 0 | 0 | 0 | 0 | 2 | 2 | 0 | 0 | 2 | 2 |
| 20 | DF | (Serbia) | Kosta Nedeljković | 5 | 0 | 1 | 0 | 2 | 2 | 2 | 0 | 10 | 2 |
| 50 | DF | (Netherlands) | Sil Swinkels | 0 | 0 | 0 | 0 | 1 | 1 | 0 | 0 | 1 | 1 |
| 66 | DF | (England) | Travis Patterson | 0 | 0 | 0 | 0 | 1 | 0 | 0 | 0 | 1 | 0 |
| 72 | FW | (England) | Kadan Young | 0 | 0 | 0 | 0 | 2 | 1 | 0 | 0 | 2 | 1 |
Player(s) who featured but departed the club permanently during the season:
| 3 | DF | (Brazil) | Diego Carlos | 10 | 8 | 0 | 0 | 1 | 1 | 6 | 5 | 17 | 14 |
| 9 | FW | (Colombia) | Jhon Durán | 20 | 4 | 0 | 0 | 2 | 2 | 7 | 1 | 29 | 7 |
| 19 | FW | (England) | Jaden Philogene | 11 | 2 | 0 | 0 | 1 | 1 | 3 | 1 | 15 | 4 |

=== Goals ===
As of match played 25 May 2025

| Rank | Pos. | No. | Player | Premier League | FA Cup | EFL Cup | Champions League | Total |
|---|---|---|---|---|---|---|---|---|
| 1 | CF | 11 | (England) Ollie Watkins | 16 | 0 | 0 | 1 | 17 |
| 2 | AM | 27 | (England) Morgan Rogers | 8 | 2 | 0 | 4 | 14 |
| 3 | CF | 9 | (Colombia) Jhon Durán | 7 | 0 | 2 | 3 | 12 |
| 4 | AM | 21 | (Spain) Marco Asensio | 3 | 2 | 0 | 3 | 8 |
| 5 | CM | 8 | (Belgium) Youri Tielemans | 3 | 0 | 0 | 2 | 5 |
| 5 | CDM | 24 | (Belgium) Amadou Onana | 3 | 1 | 0 | 1 | 5 |
| 7 | CM | 6 | (England) Ross Barkley | 3 | 0 | 0 | 1 | 4 |
| 7 | CM | 7 | (Scotland) John McGinn | 1 | 0 | 0 | 3 | 4 |
| 7 | CF | 9 | (England) Marcus Rashford | 2 | 2 | 0 | 0 | 4 |
| 7 | AM | 41 | (England) Jacob Ramsey | 1 | 2 | 0 | 1 | 4 |
| 11 | CB | 4 | (England) Ezri Konsa | 2 | 0 | 0 | 1 | 3 |
| 11 | AM | 17 | (Netherlands) Donyell Malen | 3 | 0 | 0 | 0 | 3 |
| 12 | LB | 22 | (Netherlands) Ian Maatsen | 1 | 0 | 0 | 1 | 2 |
| 12 | RW | 31 | (Jamaica) Leon Bailey | 1 | 0 | 0 | 1 | 2 |
| 15 | RB | 2 | (Poland) Matty Cash | 1 | 0 | 0 | 0 | 1 |
| 15 | AM | 10 | (Argentina) Emiliano Buendía | 0 | 0 | 1 | 0 | 1 |
| 15 | CDM | 44 | (France) Boubacar Kamara | 1 | 0 | 0 | 0 | 1 |
| Own goals | | | | 2 | 0 | 0 | 1 | 3 |
| Totals | | | | 56 | 9 | 3 | 23 | 92 |

=== Assists ===
As of match played 25 May 2025

| Rank | Pos. | No. | Player | Premier League | FA Cup | EFL Cup | Champions League | Total |
|---|---|---|---|---|---|---|---|---|
| 1 | CF | 11 | (England) Ollie Watkins | 8 | 2 | 0 | 4 | 14 |
| 2 | FW | 27 | (England) Morgan Rogers | 10 | 1 | 0 | 2 | 13 |
| 3 | CM | 8 | (Belgium) Youri Tielemans | 7 | 0 | 0 | 3 | 10 |
| 4 | CM | 7 | (Scotland) John McGinn | 4 | 0 | 0 | 2 | 6 |
| 4 | LB | 12 | (France) Lucas Digne | 4 | 2 | 0 | 0 | 6 |
| 6 | CF | 9 | (England) Marcus Rashford | 2 | 1 | 0 | 2 | 5 |
| 6 | AM | 41 | (England) Jacob Ramsey | 3 | 0 | 0 | 2 | 5 |
| 8 | RW | 31 | (Jamaica) Leon Bailey | 2 | 0 | 1 | 1 | 4 |
| 9 | LB | 22 | (Netherlands) Ian Maatsen | 2 | 0 | 0 | 0 | 2 |
| 10 | RB | 2 | (Poland) Matty Cash | 1 | 0 | 0 | 0 | 1 |
| 10 | CB | 5 | (England) Tyrone Mings | 0 | 0 | 0 | 1 | 1 |
| 10 | CM | 6 | (England) Ross Barkley | 1 | 0 | 0 | 0 | 1 |
| 10 | CB | 14 | (Spain) Pau Torres | 0 | 0 | 0 | 1 | 1 |
| 10 | AM | 21 | (Spain) Marco Asensio | 1 | 0 | 0 | 0 | 1 |
| Totals | | | | 46 | 6 | 1 | 18 | 71 |

=== Clean sheets ===
As of match played 25 May 2025

| Rank | No. | Player | Premier League | FA Cup | EFL Cup | Champions League | Total |
|---|---|---|---|---|---|---|---|
| 1 | 23 | (Argentina) Emiliano Martínez | 8 | 2 | 0 | 5 | 15 |
| 2 | 25 | (Sweden) Robin Olsen | 1 | 0 | 0 | 0 | 1 |
| Totals | | | 9 | 2 | 0 | 5 | 16 |

=== Disciplinary record ===
As of match played 25 May 2025

| No. | Pos. | Player | Premier League | | | FA Cup | | | EFL Cup | | | Champions League | | | Total | | |
| No. | Pos. | Player | Yellow card | (yellow card) (yellow-red card) | Red card | Yellow card | (yellow card) (yellow-red card) | Red card | Yellow card | (yellow card) (yellow-red card) | Red card | Yellow card | (yellow card) (yellow-red card) | Red card | Yellow card | (yellow card) (yellow-red card) | Red card |
|---|---|---|---|---|---|---|---|---|---|---|---|---|---|---|---|---|---|
| 2 | RB | (Poland) Matty Cash | 7 | 0 | 0 | 0 | 0 | 0 | 0 | 0 | 0 | 1 | 0 | 0 | 8 | 0 | 0 |
| 3 | CB | (France) Axel Disasi | 2 | 0 | 0 | 0 | 0 | 0 | 0 | 0 | 0 | 0 | 0 | 0 | 2 | 0 | 0 |
| 3 | CB | (Brazil) Diego Carlos | 1 | 0 | 0 | 0 | 0 | 0 | 1 | 0 | 0 | 3 | 0 | 0 | 5 | 0 | 0 |
| 4 | CB | (England) Ezri Konsa | 1 | 0 | 0 | 0 | 0 | 0 | 0 | 0 | 0 | 1 | 0 | 0 | 2 | 0 | 0 |
| 5 | CB | (England) Tyrone Mings | 1 | 0 | 0 | 0 | 0 | 0 | 1 | 0 | 0 | 1 | 0 | 0 | 3 | 0 | 0 |
| 6 | CM | (England) Ross Barkley | 3 | 0 | 0 | 0 | 0 | 0 | 0 | 0 | 0 | 1 | 0 | 0 | 4 | 0 | 0 |
| 7 | CM | (Scotland) John McGinn | 7 | 0 | 0 | 0 | 0 | 0 | 0 | 0 | 0 | 1 | 0 | 0 | 8 | 0 | 0 |
| 8 | CM | (Belgium) Youri Tielemans | 4 | 0 | 0 | 0 | 0 | 0 | 0 | 0 | 0 | 1 | 0 | 0 | 5 | 0 | 0 |
| 9 | CF | (Colombia) Jhon Durán | 3 | 0 | 1 | 0 | 0 | 0 | 0 | 0 | 0 | 2 | 0 | 0 | 5 | 0 | 1 |
| 10 | AM | (Argentina) Emiliano Buendía | 1 | 0 | 0 | 0 | 0 | 0 | 0 | 0 | 0 | 0 | 0 | 0 | 1 | 0 | 0 |
| 11 | CF | (England) Ollie Watkins | 2 | 0 | 0 | 0 | 0 | 0 | 0 | 0 | 0 | 0 | 0 | 0 | 2 | 0 | 0 |
| 12 | LB | (France) Lucas Digne | 4 | 0 | 0 | 0 | 0 | 0 | 0 | 0 | 0 | 2 | 0 | 0 | 6 | 0 | 0 |
| 14 | CB | (Spain) Pau Torres | 2 | 0 | 0 | 0 | 0 | 0 | 0 | 0 | 0 | 1 | 0 | 0 | 3 | 0 | 0 |
| 19 | AM | (England) Jaden Philogene | 3 | 1 | 0 | 0 | 0 | 0 | 0 | 0 | 0 | 0 | 0 | 0 | 3 | 1 | 0 |
| 21 | AM | (Spain) Marco Asensio | 2 | 0 | 0 | 0 | 0 | 0 | 0 | 0 | 0 | 0 | 0 | 0 | 2 | 0 | 0 |
| 22 | LB | (Netherlands) Ian Maatsen | 2 | 0 | 0 | 0 | 0 | 0 | 0 | 0 | 0 | 1 | 0 | 0 | 3 | 0 | 0 |
| 23 | GK | (Argentina) Emiliano Martínez | 5 | 0 | 1 | 0 | 0 | 0 | 0 | 0 | 0 | 0 | 0 | 0 | 5 | 0 | 1 |
| 24 | CDM | (Belgium) Amadou Onana | 4 | 0 | 0 | 0 | 0 | 0 | 0 | 0 | 0 | 0 | 0 | 0 | 4 | 0 | 0 |
| 26 | CB | (Netherlands) Lamare Bogarde | 2 | 0 | 0 | 0 | 0 | 0 | 0 | 0 | 0 | 0 | 0 | 0 | 2 | 0 | 0 |
| 27 | FW | (England) Morgan Rogers | 10 | 0 | 0 | 1 | 0 | 0 | 0 | 0 | 0 | 1 | 0 | 0 | 12 | 0 | 0 |
| 31 | RW | (Jamaica) Leon Bailey | 3 | 0 | 0 | 0 | 0 | 0 | 0 | 0 | 0 | 1 | 0 | 0 | 4 | 0 | 0 |
| 41 | CM | (England) Jacob Ramsey | 2 | 1 | 0 | 0 | 0 | 0 | 0 | 0 | 0 | 0 | 0 | 0 | 2 | 1 | 0 |
| 44 | CDM | (France) Boubacar Kamara | 2 | 0 | 0 | 1 | 0 | 0 | 0 | 0 | 0 | 2 | 0 | 0 | 5 | 0 | 0 |
| Totals | | | 73 | 2 | 2 | 2 | 0 | 0 | 2 | 0 | 0 | 19 | 0 | 0 | 96 | 2 | 2 |

== Club awards ==
=== Player of the Month award ===
Voted for by fans on Aston Villa's official website.

| Month | Player |
|---|---|
| August | (Belgium) Amadou Onana |
| September | (Colombia) Jhon Durán |
| October | (Belgium) Youri Tielemans |
| November | (Argentina) Emiliano Martínez |
| December | (England) Morgan Rogers |
| January | (England) Morgan Rogers |
| February | (Spain) Marco Asensio |
| March | (Spain) Marco Asensio |
| April | (Belgium) Youri Tielemans |
| May | Not awarded |

=== Goal of the Month award ===
Voted for by fans on Aston Villa's Twitter account.

| Month | Player | Competition | Opponent |
|---|---|---|---|
| August | (Colombia) Jhon Durán | Premier League | Leicester City |
| September | (Colombia) Jhon Durán | Premier League | Everton |
| October | (Colombia) Jhon Durán | Champions League | Bayern Munich |
| November | Not awarded | | |
| December | (Colombia) Jhon Durán | Champions League | RB Leipzig |
| January | (England) Ross Barkley | Premier League | Leicester City |
| February | (England) Ollie Watkins | Premier League | Liverpool |
| March | Not awarded | | |
| April | (Scotland) John McGinn | Champions League | Paris Saint-Germain |
| May | Not awarded | | |

=== End of Season awards ===
| Award | Winner |
|---|---|
| Supporter's Player of the Season | (Belgium) Youri Tielemans |
| Player's Player of the Season | (Belgium) Youri Tielemans |
| Young Player of the Season | (England) Morgan Rogers |
| Goal of the Season | (Scotland) John McGinn vs. Paris Saint-Germain |
