= Morgan Rogers =

English footballer (born 2002)

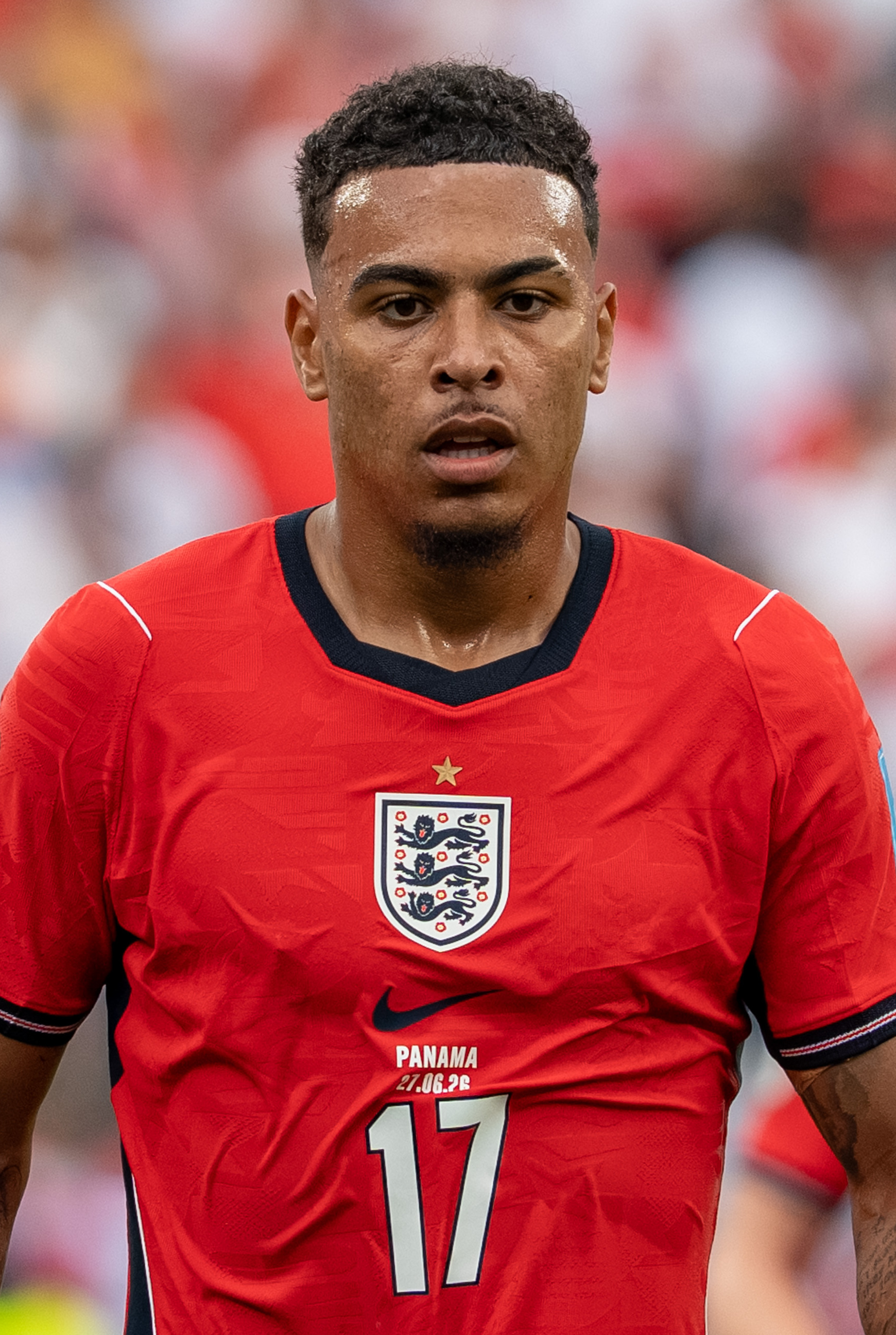
- Rogers with England in 2026

Personal information
- Full name: Morgan Elliot Rogers
- Date of birth: 26 July 2002 (age 24)
- Place of birth: Halesowen, England
- Height: 6 ft 2 in (1.87 m)
- Positions: Attacking midfielder; winger

Team information
- Current team: Chelsea
- Number: 17

Youth career
- 2008–2010: Halas Hawks
- 2010–2019: West Bromwich Albion

Senior career*
Years	Team	Apps	(Gls)
2019	West Bromwich Albion	0	(0)
2019–2023	Manchester City	0	(0)
2021	→ Lincoln City (loan)	25	(6)
2021–2022	→ Bournemouth (loan)	15	(1)
2023	→ Blackpool (loan)	20	(1)
2023–2024	Middlesbrough	26	(2)
2024–2026	Aston Villa	85	(21)
2026–	Chelsea	11	(5)

International career^{‡}
2016–2017	England U15	6	(5)
2017–2018	England U16	8	(5)
2018–2019	England U17	15	(9)
2019–2020	England U18	8	(1)
2021–2022	England U20	4	(1)
2024	England U21	7	(4)
2024–	England	28	(3)
Medal record
Men's football
Representing England
FIFA World Cup
Third place	2026 Canada–Mexico–US
- * Club domestic league appearances and goals as of 16:31, 21 November 2026 (UTC) ‡ National team caps and goals as of 21:55, 15 November 2026 (UTC)

Morgan Elliot Rogers (born 26 July 2002) is an English professional footballer who plays as an attacking midfielder or winger for Premier League club Chelsea and the England national team. A versatile player across attacking positions, Rogers is known for his strength, attacking runs, ability to score from a distance, and ball control.

Born in Halesowen in the Dudley Metropolitan Borough, Rogers is a product of the West Bromwich Albion academy. He signed for Manchester City in 2019, but did not make an appearance for the club. After loan spells at Lincoln City, Bournemouth, and Blackpool, he joined Middlesbrough in 2023. After half a season at the club, Rogers signed for Aston Villa for a reported fee of £8 million in 2024. Following a breakout season with Villa in which he was named their young player of the season, Rogers won the PFA Young Player of the Year award in 2025. In July 2026, he joined Chelsea for a fee of £117 million, a record for an English player.

Rogers has represented England at international levels from under-15 to senior, making his senior international debut in 2024. In May 2026, he made the squad for the 2026 FIFA World Cup.

== Early life ==
Born in Halesowen to Deborah and Howard Rogers, Rogers attended Colley Lane Primary and Sandwell Academy, and was part of the Sandwell team that won the National Schools Cup in 2017, scoring and assisting in the final. Rogers was a childhood fan of West Bromwich Albion and a childhood friend of fellow footballer Jude Bellingham.

== Club career ==
=== West Bromwich Albion ===
Rogers joined West Bromwich Albion at the age of seven, after being spotted by a club scout. He made his professional debut for West Brom on 6 February 2019, coming on as an 82nd-minute substitute for Wes Hoolahan against Brighton & Hove Albion in the FA Cup.

=== Manchester City ===
Rogers signed for Manchester City on 1 August 2019.

==== Lincoln City (loan) ====
On 4 January 2021, Rogers signed for Lincoln City on loan until the end of the season. He made his debut for the club against Peterborough United a few days later, coming off the bench. He scored his first professional goal against Portsmouth in a 1–0 win on 26 January. Three goals in seven games during the month of March contributed to his winning the EFL Young Player of the Month award during his loan spell.

==== Bournemouth (loan) ====
On 23 August 2021, Rogers signed for Bournemouth on loan until the end of the season. Rogers found his first-team opportunities at Bournemouth limited, and was confined to mostly substitute appearances during the season. He scored his only goal for the club on 15 January 2022, in a 3–2 Championship defeat against Luton Town.

==== Blackpool (loan) ====
On 4 January 2023, Rogers joined Blackpool on loan for the remainder of the season. He scored his only goal for the club in a 1–0 win against Norwich City on 8 May 2023.

=== Middlesbrough ===
On 7 July 2023, Rogers signed for Championship club Middlesbrough for an undisclosed fee. He scored his first goal for the club on 29 July, a late equaliser to make it 2–2 in a pre-season friendly against Auxerre. He scored his first competitive goal for the club on 29 August in a 3–1 EFL Cup win against Bolton Wanderers.

Rogers scored five times during Middlesbrough's run to the EFL Cup semi-finals, making him the competition's top goalscorer for the season.

=== Aston Villa ===
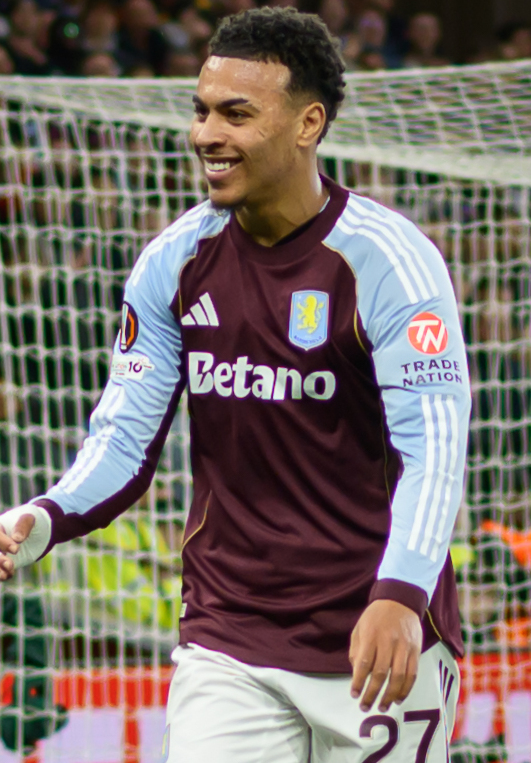
Rogers playing for Aston Villa in 2026

On 1 February 2024, 21-year-old Rogers signed for Premier League club Aston Villa for an undisclosed fee, reported to be £8m, potentially rising to £15m with performance-related add-ons. Manchester City were entitled to 25% of the fee, due to a sell-on clause in the original transfer to Middlesbrough. On 3 February, Rogers made his Premier League debut as a late substitute in a 5–0 victory away at Sheffield United.

On 6 April 2024, Rogers scored his first goal for Aston Villa in a 3–3 draw against Brentford. On 29 January 2025, he netted his first UEFA Champions League goals by scoring a hat-trick, including two in the first five minutes, in a 4–2 victory over Celtic in which he was named player of the match. In doing so, he became the second youngest English player to score a hat-trick in the competition. On April 10, 2025, Aston Villa lost 3–1 to Paris Saint-Germain in the Champions League quarterfinal first leg; Rogers scored Aston Villa's only goal.

After a breakout 2024–25 season in which he scored 14 goals and provided 15 assists across all competitions, Rogers was named Aston Villa's Young Player of the Season at the club's end of season awards. On 19 June 2025, it was announced that Rogers was one of six nominees for the PFA Young Player of the Year award, which he then went on to win – becoming the fifth Aston Villa player to win the award since its inception.

On 10 November 2025, Rogers signed a contract extension with Aston Villa until 2031. On 20 May 2026, he scored in a 3–0 win over SC Freiburg in the Europa League final as his club won the competition for the first time in their history. UEFA subsequently named Rogers the Europa League Player of the Season.

=== Chelsea ===
On 21 July 2026, Rogers joined Premier League club Chelsea. The fee of £117 million for Rogers became the record for an English footballer.

On 24 August 2026, Rogers scored his first Premier League goal for Chelsea with a 3–2 victory over Fulham in the opening round. In the third round of the EFL Cup against Leeds United on 9 September, Rogers was introduced as a half-time substitute with Chelsea trailing 0–1, and set up four goals as the club fought back to win 6–3.

== International career ==
=== Youth ===
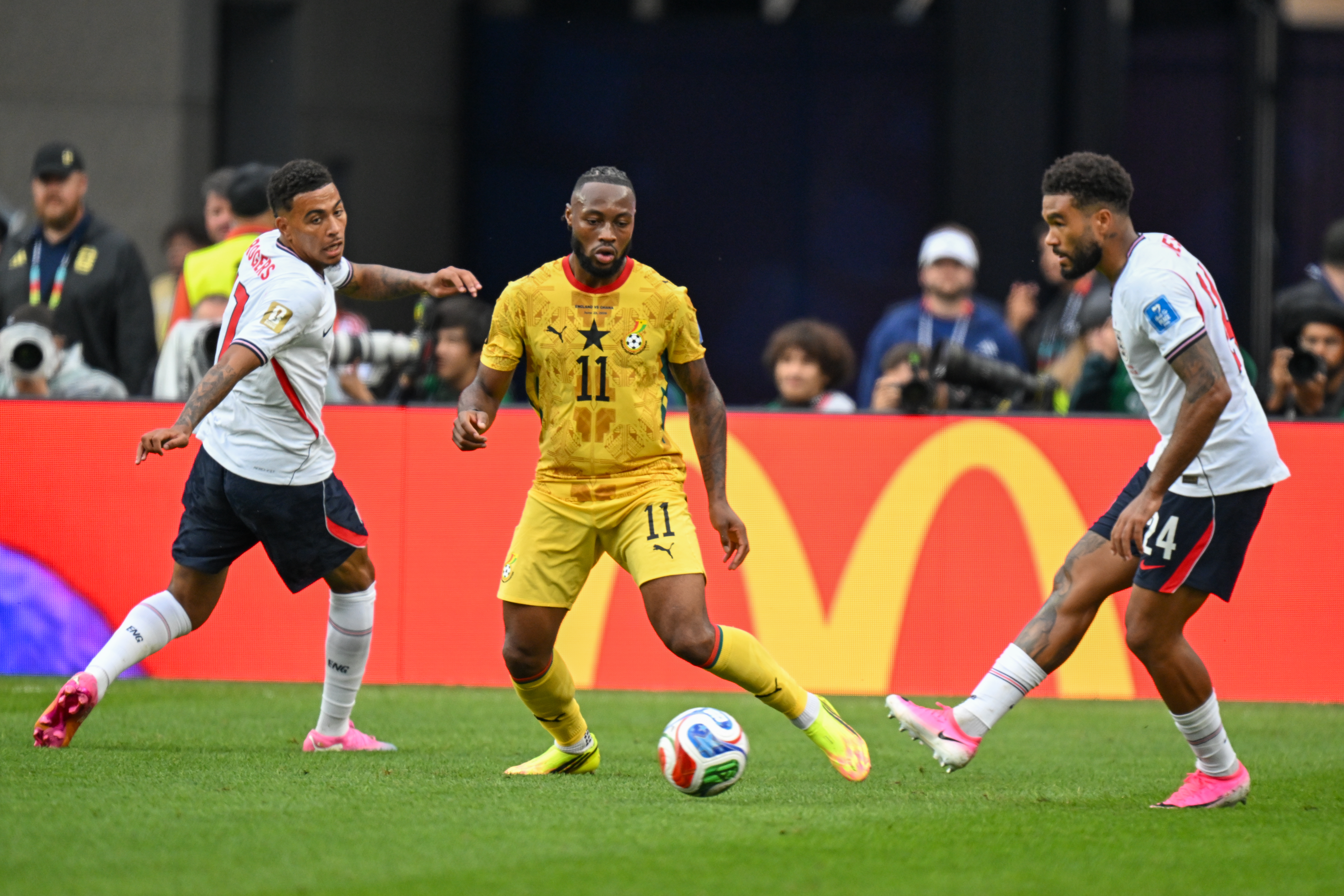
Rogers (left) with England in 2026

Rogers has represented England at all international levels from under-15 to senior.

He represented the England under-16 team at the 2018 Montaigu Tournament. In September 2018, Rogers scored a hat-trick for the England under-17 team in a game against Belgium. The following month saw him score against the United States as well as scoring the final goal in a 3–1 victory against Brazil. In March 2019, Rogers scored twice in an elite qualifier against Switzerland. In April 2019, Rogers was included in the England squad for the 2019 UEFA European Under-17 Championship. Rogers made his England under-18 debut as a 64th minute substitute during a 3–2 win over Australia on 6 September 2019.

On 6 September 2021, Rogers made his debut for the England U20s during a 6–1 victory over Romania U20s at St. George's Park. On 22 March 2024, Rogers made his debut for the England U21s during a 5–1 victory over Azerbaijan in Baku during 2025 UEFA European Under-21 Championship qualification.

=== Senior ===
Rogers with England at the 2026 FIFA World Cup

On 11 November 2024, Rogers was called up to the England senior team for the first time for upcoming UEFA Nations League fixtures against Greece and the Republic of Ireland. The 22-year-old made his senior debut on 14 November as a second-half substitute in a 3–0 away victory against Greece. Rogers scored his first England goal in a 3–0 friendly win over Wales at Wembley on 9 October 2025.

On 22 May 2026, Rogers was selected in the 26-man squad for the 2026 FIFA World Cup.

== Style of play ==
Rogers is a versatile player who primarily operated as a number 10 at Aston Villa but can also play as a winger, striker or attacking midfielder. Tactically, he is known to take long distance shots and engage in an aggressive style of attacking play, driving at opponents and breaking defensive lines. He has received praise for his physical strength, powerful runs, tactical intelligence, ability to score from a distance, dribbling and work ethic. His strength on the ball and dangerous runs have drawn media comparisons to Jamal Musiala, Ronaldo and Wayne Rooney. Rogers himself has expressed admiration for Musiala, as well as Florian Wirtz and Villa teammate Jadon Sancho.

Described throughout 2025 as one of the best young players in the Premier League, media outlets began describing Rogers as one of the best attacking midfielders in the world during the 2025–26 season, with both FourFourTwo and Sports Illustrated ranking him eighth in his position. Sports Illustrated described Rogers as an "anomaly" among attacking midfielders due to his physical strength, while ESPN included Rogers in twelfth on their 2025 FC 100 list of the best attacking midfielders in the world, writing that Rogers "has it all – youth, power, intensity, skills, hunger, energy, confidence". In the same year GiveMeSport wrote that his ball control was "one of, if not the best in the league". Owing to Rogers' performances, some media sources opined that Rogers could start for England at the 2026 World Cup in the number 10 role, potentially keeping Jude Bellingham and Cole Palmer out of the starting eleven; Bellingham went on to be England's starting number 10 while Palmer was not selected in the squad.

After scoring, Rogers will often celebrate with an "ice cold" celebration where he crosses his arms and rubs his shoulders, a move later popularised by Rogers' former Manchester City and current Chelsea teammate Cole Palmer; Palmer has attributed this move to Rogers, saying "My boy Morgz did one for Middlesbrough, so I told him I'd do it too if I scored."

== Career statistics ==
=== Club ===
As of match played 21 November 2026

Appearances and goals by club, season and competition
Club	Season	League			FA Cup		EFL Cup		Europe		Other		Total	
Club	Season	Division	Apps	Goals	Apps	Goals	Apps	Goals	Apps	Goals	Apps	Goals	Apps	Goals
West Bromwich Albion U21	2017–18	—			—		—		—		1 (Note: Appearance(s) in EFL Trophy)	0	1	0
West Bromwich Albion	2018–19	Championship	0	0	1	0	0	0	—		—		1	0
Manchester City U21	2019–20	—			—		—		—		4	1	4	1
Manchester City U21	2020–21	—			—		—		—		1	0	1	0
Manchester City U21	Total		—		—		—		—		5	1	5	1
Lincoln City (loan)	2020–21	League One	25	6	—		—		—		3 (Note: Appearances in League One play-offs)	0	28	6
Bournemouth (loan)	2021–22	Championship	15	1	1	0	1	0	—		—		17	1
Blackpool (loan)	2022–23	Championship	20	1	2	0	—		—		—		22	1
Middlesbrough	2023–24	Championship	26	2	1	0	6	5	—		—		33	7
Aston Villa	2023–24	Premier League	11	3	—		—		5 (Note: Appearances in UEFA Europa Conference League)	0	—		16	3
Aston Villa	2024–25	Premier League	37	8	5	2	0	0	12 (Note: Appearances in UEFA Champions League)	4	—		54	14
Aston Villa	2025–26	Premier League	37	10	2	1	1	0	15 (Note: Appearances in UEFA Europa League)	3	—		55	14
Aston Villa	Total		85	21	7	3	1	0	32	7	—		125	31
Chelsea	2026–27	Premier League	11	5	0	0	3	1	—		—		14	6
Career total			182	36	12	3	11	6	32	7	9	1	246	53

=== International ===
As of match played 15 November 2026

Appearances and goals by national team and year
National team	Year	Apps	Goals
England	2024	2	0
England	2025	10	1
England	2026	16	2
Total		28	3

Scores and results list England's goal tally first.

List of international goals scored by Morgan Rogers
No.	Date	Venue	Cap	Opponent	Score	Result	Competition	Ref.
1	9 October 2025	Wembley Stadium, London, England	9	Wales	1–0	3–0	Friendly	
2	3 October 2026	Stadion Rujevica, Rijeka, Croatia	25	Croatia	7–0	7–0	2026–27 UEFA Nations League A	
3	12 November 2026	Wembley Stadium, London, England	27	Croatia	1–0	2–1	2026–27 UEFA Nations League A	

== Honours ==
Manchester City U18

- FA Youth Cup: 2019–20

Aston Villa

- UEFA Europa League: 2025–26

England

- FIFA World Cup third place: 2026

Individual

- EFL League One Young Player of the Month: March 2021
- EFL Cup top scorer: 2023–24
- Aston Villa Young Player of the Season: 2024–25
- The Athletic Premier League Young Player of the Season: 2024–25
- PFA Young Player of the Year: 2024–25
- UEFA Europa League Player of the Season: 2025–26
- UEFA Europa League Team of the Season: 2025–26
