= James Wright (footballer) =

English footballer (born 2004)

Personal information
- Full name: James Thomas Wright
- Date of birth: 2 December 2004 (age 21)
- Height: 1.88 m (6 ft 2 in)
- Position: Goalkeeper

Team information
- Current team: Aston Villa
- Number: 42

Youth career
- –2020: Manchester City
- 2020–2024: Aston Villa

Senior career*
Years	Team	Apps	(Gls)
2024–	Aston Villa	0	(0)
2024–2025	→ Real Unión (loan)	38	(0)
- * Club domestic league appearances and goals as of 16:00, 20 June 2025 (UTC)

James Thomas Wright (born 2 December 2004) is an English professional footballer who plays as a goalkeeper for Premier League club Aston Villa.

He is a product of the Aston Villa and Manchester City academies. Wright spent the 2024–25 season on loan at Spanish club Real Unión.

== Club career ==
=== Early career ===
Wright was a junior at Manchester City but he left the club to join Aston Villa as a scholar in 2020, aged sixteen.

=== Aston Villa ===
Wright signed his first professional contract at Aston Villa in 2022. Wright was part of the senior squad's summer tour to the United States in summer 2024.

Wright joined Aston Villa's Spanish sister club, Real Unión in August 2024. He subsequently made his professional debut on 7 September in a 2–1 away win against CA Osasuna B in the Primera Federación Group 1.

On 20 May 2026, Wright was an unused substitute as Aston Villa won the 2026 UEFA Europa League final, winning their first major trophy for 30 years.

== Career statistics ==
=== Club ===
As of match played 27 October 2026

Appearances and goals by club, season and competition
Club	Season	League			FA Cup		EFL Cup		Europe		Other		Total	
Club	Season	Division	Apps	Goals	Apps	Goals	Apps	Goals	Apps	Goals	Apps	Goals	Apps	Goals
Aston Villa	2024–25	Premier League	0	0	0	0	0	0	0	0	—		0	0
Aston Villa	2025–26	Premier League	0	0	0	0	0	0	0	0	—		0	0
Aston Villa	2026–27	Premier League	0	0	0	0	0	0	0	0	2 (Note: Appearances in EFL Trophy)	0	2	0
Aston Villa	Total		0	0	0	0	0	0	0	0	2	0	2	0
Real Unión (loan)	2024–25	Primera Federación	38	0	0	0	—		—		—		38	0
Career total			38	0	0	0	0	0	0	0	2	0	40	0

== Honours ==
Aston Villa U21s

- Birmingham Senior Cup: 2023–24

Aston Villa

- UEFA Europa League: 2025–26
