= Istmina =

Coordinates: 5°10′N 76°41′W

- Municipality and city
- Flag Coat of arms

- Location of the municipality and city of Istmina in the Chocó Department of Colombia.
- Country: Colombia
- Department: Choco Department
- Founded: March 8, 1834

Government
  - Mayor: Arbey Pino

Area
  - Municipality and city: 1,880 km^{2} (730 sq mi)
  - Urban: 3.05 km^{2} (1.18 sq mi)
- Elevation: 65 m (213 ft)

Population (2018 census)
  - Municipality and city: 30,742
  - Density: 16.4/km^{2} (42.4/sq mi)
  - Urban: 22,258
  - Urban density: 7,300/km^{2} (18,900/sq mi)
- Time zone: UTC-5 (Colombia Standard Time)

Istmina is a small city and municipality in the Chocó Department, Colombia. The city of Istmina was founded in 1834 by Juan Nepomuceno Mosquera, initially with the name of San Pablo. The name was changed in 1903 to Istmina, a contraction of isthmus and minas (mines), two characteristics of the area. The municipality covers 1,880 square kilometres (726 sq mi), with an average elevation of 79 metres (259 ft), and an average temperature of 26.7 °C (80 °F). Istmina is located 75 km (47 mi) from the departmental capital, Quibdó.

== Climate ==
Istmina has a very wet tropical rainforest climate (Af).

Climate data for Istmina city
Month	Jan	Feb	Mar	Apr	May	Jun	Jul	Aug	Sep	Oct	Nov	Dec	Year
Mean daily maximum °C (°F)	30.9 (87.6)	30.8 (87.4)	31.5 (88.7)	31.3 (88.3)	31.4 (88.5)	31.1 (88.0)	31.4 (88.5)	31.3 (88.3)	31.1 (88.0)	30.8 (87.4)	30.4 (86.7)	30.5 (86.9)	31.0 (87.9)
Daily mean °C (°F)	26.6 (79.9)	26.5 (79.7)	27.0 (80.6)	27.0 (80.6)	27.0 (80.6)	26.7 (80.1)	26.8 (80.2)	26.7 (80.1)	26.7 (80.1)	26.5 (79.7)	26.3 (79.3)	26.3 (79.3)	26.7 (80.0)
Mean daily minimum °C (°F)	22.4 (72.3)	22.3 (72.1)	22.6 (72.7)	22.7 (72.9)	22.6 (72.7)	22.3 (72.1)	22.3 (72.1)	22.2 (72.0)	22.3 (72.1)	22.2 (72.0)	22.2 (72.0)	22.2 (72.0)	22.4 (72.3)
Average rainfall mm (inches)	566.9 (22.32)	644.7 (25.38)	551.1 (21.70)	633.8 (24.95)	685.1 (26.97)	624.0 (24.57)	624.9 (24.60)	702.6 (27.66)	612.7 (24.12)	637.9 (25.11)	572.6 (22.54)	564.0 (22.20)	7,420.3 (292.12)
Average rainy days	17	16	16	18	20	20	20	21	20	19	19	18	224
Source 1:
Source 2:
