= 2024–25 Bristol Rovers F.C. season =

142nd season in existence of Bristol Rovers FC

Bristol Rovers
2024–25 season
- Owner: Hussain Al-Saeed
- CEO: Tom Gorringe
- Manager: Matt Taylor (until 16 December); David Horseman (interim basis); Iñigo Calderón (from 26 December)
- Stadium: Memorial Stadium
- League One: 22nd (relegated)
- FA Cup: Third round
- EFL Cup: First round
- EFL Trophy: Group stage
- Top goalscorer: League: Ruel Sotiriou (6); All: Isaac Hutchinson; Ruel Sotiriou (both 6)
- Highest home attendance: 9,508 vs. Exeter City (12 April 2025)
- Lowest home attendance: 1,257 vs. Exeter City (29 October 2024, EFL Trophy Group Stage)
- Average home league attendance: 7,880

The 2024–25 season is the 142nd season in the history of Bristol Rovers Football Club and their third consecutive season in League One. In addition to the domestic league, the club would also participate in the FA Cup, the EFL Cup, and the EFL Trophy.

== Current squad ==
As of 3 February 2025

No.	Name	Position	Nationality	Date of birth (age)	Previous club	Date signed	Fee	Contract end
Goalkeepers
31	Jed Ward	GK	(England)	20 May 2003 (aged 22)	Academy	1 July 2023	Trainee	30 June 2028
35	Matt Hall	GK	(England)	24 April 2003 (aged 22)	Southampton	26 July 2023	Free	30 June 2025
36	Myles Roberts	GK	(England)	9 December 2001 (aged 23)	Watford	3 February 2025	Loan	30 June 2025
Defenders
2	Joel Senior	RB	(England)	24 June 1999 (aged 26)	Morecambe	1 July 2024	Free	30 June 2026
3	Lino Sousa	LB	(England)	19 January 2005 (aged 20)	Aston Villa	14 August 2024	Loan	30 June 2025
4	Taylor Moore	CB	(England)	12 May 1997 (aged 28)	Valenciennes	1 July 2024	Free	30 June 2027
5	James Wilson	CB	(Wales)	26 February 1989 (aged 36)	Plymouth Argyle	1 July 2023	Free	30 June 2025
6	Clinton Mola	LB	(England)	15 March 2001 (aged 24)	Reading	1 July 2024	Free	30 June 2027
17	Connor Taylor	CB	(England)	25 October 2001 (aged 23)	Stoke City	3 August 2023	£300,000	30 June 2026
25	Sil Swinkels	CB	(Netherlands)	6 January 2004 (aged 21)	Aston Villa	3 February 2025	Loan	30 June 2025
32	Jack Hunt	RB	(England)	6 December 1990 (aged 34)	Sheffield Wednesday	17 August 2023	Free	30 June 2025
Midfielders
8	Grant Ward	CM	(England)	5 December 1994 (aged 30)	Blackpool	27 January 2023	Free	30 June 2025
14	Romaine Sawyers	CM	(Saint Kitts and Nevis)	2 November 1991 (aged 33)	AFC Wimbledon	8 January 2025	Free	30 June 2025
19	Isaac Hutchinson	AM	(England)	10 April 2000 (aged 25)	Walsall	20 June 2024	Undisclosed	30 June 2027
22	Kamil Conteh	DM	(Sierra Leone)	26 December 2002 (aged 22)	Grimsby Town	26 January 2024	£300,000	30 June 2027
26	Matt Butcher	DM	(England)	14 May 1997 (aged 28)	Wycombe Wanderers	30 January 2025	Loan	30 June 2025
29	Jamie Lindsay	CM	(Scotland)	11 October 1995 (aged 29)	Rotherham United	12 July 2024	Free	30 June 2027
34	Jerry Lawrence	CM	(England)	5 March 2005 (aged 20)	Academy	1 July 2023	Trainee	30 June 2025
Forwards
7	Scott Sinclair	LW	(England)	25 March 1989 (aged 36)	Preston North End	18 October 2022	Free	30 June 2025
9	Promise Omochere	RW	(Republic of Ireland)	18 October 2000 (aged 24)	Fleetwood Town	19 July 2024	£500,000	30 June 2027
10	Ruel Sotiriou	CF	(Cyprus)	24 August 2000 (aged 24)	Leyton Orient	26 June 2024	Undisclosed	30 June 2027
11	Luke Thomas	RW	(England)	19 February 1999 (aged 26)	Barnsley	1 July 2023	Free	30 June 2026
18	Chris Martin	CF	(Scotland)	4 November 1988 (aged 36)	Queens Park Rangers	26 September 2023	Free	30 June 2025
21	Micah Anthony	LW	(England)	26 March 2004 (aged 21)	Queens Park Rangers	1 July 2024	Free	30 June 2026
24	Gatlin O'Donkor	CF	(England)	14 October 2004 (aged 20)	Oxford United	30 August 2024	Loan	30 June 2025
28	Shaq Forde	CF	(England)	5 May 2004 (aged 21)	Watford	30 August 2024	Undisclosed	30 June 2027
30	Michael Reindorf	CF	(England)	10 May 2005 (aged 20)	Cardiff City	3 February 2025	Loan	30 June 2025
Out on loan
15	Dan Ellison	CB	(England)	30 March 2005 (aged 20)	Chippenham Town	27 June 2024	£10,000	30 June 2026
23	Luke McCormick	AM	(England)	21 January 1999 (aged 26)	AFC Wimbledon	24 August 2022	Undisclosed	30 June 2025
27	Bryant Bilongo	LB	(England)	15 September 2001 (aged 23)	Middlesbrough	28 June 2024	Undisclosed	30 June 2026

== Transfers ==
=== In ===
Date	Pos	Player	From	Fee	Ref
24 June 2024	AM	Isaac Hutchinson (ENG)	Walsall (ENG)	Undisclosed	
26 June 2024	CF	Ruel Sotiriou (CYP)	Leyton Orient (ENG)	Undisclosed (Note: Although Sotiriou was out of contract, an undisclosed fee was agreed to avoid a compensation committee hearing)	
27 June 2024	CB	Dan Ellison (ENG)	Chippenham Town (ENG)	Undisclosed	
28 June 2024	LB	Bryant Bilongo (ENG)	Middlesbrough (ENG)	Undisclosed	
1 July 2024 (Note: The transfer was announced on 25 June, and would become official on July 1 once his Reading contract expired)	LB	Clinton Mola (ENG)	Reading (ENG)	Free	
1 July 2024 (Note: The transfer was announced on 30 June, and would become official on July 1 once his Valenciennes contract expired)	CB	Taylor Moore (ENG)	Valenciennes (FRA)	Free	
1 July 2024 (Note: The transfer was announced on 29 June, and would become official on July 1 once his Morecambe contract expired)	RB	Joel Senior (ENG)	Morecambe (ENG)	Free	
12 July 2024	CM	Jamie Lindsay (SCO)	Rotherham United (ENG)	Free	
19 July 2024	RW	Promise Omochere (IRL)	Fleetwood Town (ENG)	Undisclosed	
9 August 2024	LW	Micah Anthony (ENG)	Queens Park Rangers (ENG)	Free	
30 August 2024	CF	Shaq Forde (ENG)	Watford (ENG)	Undisclosed	
8 January 2025	CM	Romaine Sawyers (SKN)	AFC Wimbledon (ENG)	Free	

=== Out ===
Date	Pos.	Player	To	Fee	Ref.
4 July 2024	CM	Antony Evans (ENG)	Huddersfield Town (ENG)	Undisclosed	
1 August 2024	CB	James Connolly (WAL)	Crewe Alexandra (ENG)	Undisclosed	

=== Loaned in ===
Date	Pos	Player	From	Date until	Ref
5 July 2024	CB	Michael Forbes (NIR)	West Ham United (ENG)	3 January 2025 (Note: Forbes was recalled on 3 January 2025)	
10 July 2024	GK	Josh Griffiths (ENG)	West Bromwich Albion (ENG)	3 February 2025 (Note: On 3 February, Griffiths was recalled back to his parent club West Brom)	
3 August 2024	CM	Jake Garrett (ENG)	Blackburn Rovers (ENG)	3 January 2025 (Note: Garrett was recalled from his loan spell on 3 January 2025)	
14 August 2024	LB	Lino Sousa (ENG)	Aston Villa (ENG)	End of Season	
30 August 2024	CF	Gatlin O'Donkor (ENG)	Oxford United (ENG)	End of Season	
30 January 2025	CM	Matt Butcher (ENG)	Wycombe Wanderers (ENG)	End of Season	
3 February 2025	CF	Michael Reindorf (ENG)	Cardiff City (WAL)	End of Season	
3 February 2025	GK	Myles Roberts (ENG)	Watford (ENG)	End of Season	
3 February 2025	CB	Sil Swinkels (NED)	Aston Villa (ENG)	End of Season	

=== Loaned out ===
Date	Pos.	Player	To	Date until	Ref.
31 July 2024	GK	Jed Ward (ENG)	Forest Green Rovers (ENG)	3 February 2025 (Note: On 3 February 2025, Ward was recalled from his loan)	
30 August 2024	SS	Jevani Brown (JAM)	Notts County (ENG)	18 January 2025 (Note: On 18 January, Brown was recalled back from his loan at Notts County)	
16 September 2024	LB	Charlie White (ENG)	Poole Town (ENG)	October 2024	
20 September 2024	CF	Taelan Savage (ENG)	Shepton Mallet (ENG)	20 October 2024	
27 September 2024	CB	Dan Ellison (ENG)	Aldershot Town (ENG)	End of season (Note: On 10 January 2025, Ellison's loan was extended until the end of the season)	
27 September 2024	CM	Jerry Lawrence (ENG)	Yate Town (ENG)	27 October 2024	
27 September 2024	CF	Ollie Dewsbury (WAL)	Yate Town (ENG)	27 October 2024	
21 October 2024	CM	Kofi Shaw (ENG)	Yeovil Town (ENG)	18 February 2025 (Note: On 10 January 2025, Shaw's loan was extended until the end of the season) (Note: On 18 February 2025, Shaw was recalled.)	
5 November 2024	LW	Micah Anthony (ENG)	Bath City (ENG)	5 December 2024	
5 November 2024	CM	Jerry Lawrence (ENG)	Bath City (ENG)	5 December 2024	
8 November 2024	LB	Charlie White (ENG)	Yate Town (ENG)	8 December 2024	
13 December 2024	CF	Taelan Savage (ENG)	Cribbs (ENG)	13 January 2025	
13 December 2024	CB	Jay Sutherland (ENG)	Cribbs (ENG)	13 January 2025	
20 December 2024	CM	Brooklyn Leipus (LTU)	Didcot Town (ENG)	20 January 2025	
15 January 2025	LB	Bryant Bilongo (ENG)	Harrogate Town (ENG)	End of season	
17 January 2025	CM	Jerry Lawrence (ENG)	Hungerford Town (ENG)	17 February 2025	
17 January 2025	CM	Luke McCormick (ENG)	Forest Green Rovers (ENG)	End of season	
20 January 2025	CF	Ollie Dewsbury (ENG)	Taunton Town (ENG)	20 February 2025	
14 February 2025	CM	Max Edwards-Stryjewski (WAL)	Cribbs (ENG)	14 March 2025	
6 March 2025	CM	Charlie Moody (ENG)	Frome Town (ENG)	6 April 2025	
7 March 2025	LB	Charlie White (ENG)	Cribbs (ENG)	7 April 2025	

=== Released ===
Date	Pos.	Player	Subsequent club	Join date	Ref.
30 June 2024	CM	Sam Finley (ENG)	Tranmere Rovers (ENG)	1 July 2024	
30 June 2024	RB	James Gibbons (ENG)	Cambridge United (ENG)	1 July 2024	
30 June 2024	LB	Lewis Gordon (SCO)	Chesterfield (ENG)	1 July 2024	
30 June 2024	CF	Harvey Greenslade (ENG)	Yeovil Town (ENG)	1 July 2024	
30 June 2024	CM	Ryan Jones (ENG)	Aldershot Town (ENG)	1 July 2024	
30 June 2024	RB	Luca Hoole (WAL)	Shrewsbury Town (ENG) (Note: Compensation package was agreed)	16 July 2024	
30 June 2024	CF	John Marquis (ENG)	Shrewsbury Town (ENG)	19 July 2024	
30 June 2024	DM	Jordan Rossiter (ENG)	Shrewsbury Town (ENG)	30 July 2024	
30 June 2024	DM	Josh Grant (ENG)	Wealdstone (ENG)	15 November 2024	

== Pre-season and friendlies ==
On 7 April, Bristol Rovers announced a pre-season training camp in Portugal, with two friendly matches planned, opponents being announced on 16 July. On 31 May, the club announced their first three pre-season friendlies, against Melksham Town, Bath City and Yeovil Town. Six days later, a home friendly versus Plymouth Argyle was confirmed. On 25 June, it was confirmed that Cardiff City would visit during pre-season. Two matches during the Portugal training camp were later announced, against Bromley and Portimonense.

Win Draw Loss Fixtures

5 July 2024 Friendly	Melksham Town	2–4	Bristol Rovers	Melksham
19:30 BST	Stroud 58'; Graham 60' (pen.)	Report	Hutchinson 10'; Dewsbury 47'; Ellison 70', 76'	Stadium: Oakfield Stadium; Attendance: 903

13 July 2024 Friendly	Bath City	0–1	Bristol Rovers	Twerton
15:00 BST		Report	Martin 81'	Stadium: Twerton Park; Attendance: 1,908; Referee: Stacey Pearson

16 July 2024 Friendly	Yeovil Town	0–3	Bristol Rovers	Yeovil
19:00 BST		Report	Sinclair 28'; Shaw 44'; McCormick 58'	Stadium: Huish Park; Attendance: 1,715

23 July 2024 Friendly	Bristol Rovers	1–2	Bromley	Parchal, Portugal
11:00 WEST	Lawrence 85'	Report		Stadium: Estádio Municipal Bela Vista

27 July 2024 Friendly	Bristol Rovers	2–0	Portimonense	Parchal, Portugal
11:00 WEST	Omochere 42'; Thomas 90' (pen.)	Report		Stadium: Estádio Municipal Bela Vista

30 July 2024 Friendly	Bristol Rovers	2–1	Plymouth Argyle	Horfield
19:00 BST	Omochere 9'; Hunt 32'	Report	Hardie 84'	Stadium: Memorial Stadium; Attendance: 3,266

3 August 2024 Friendly	Bristol Rovers	0–2	Cardiff City	Horfield
15:00 BST		Report	Ramsey 28'; Ralls 56'	Stadium: Memorial Stadium; Attendance: 3,251

== Competitions ==
=== League One ===
==== League table ====
Pos	Team	Pld	W	D	L	GF	GA	GD	Pts	Promotion, qualification or relegation
20	Burton Albion	46	11	14	21	49	66	−17	47	
21	Crawley Town (R)	46	12	10	24	57	83	−26	46	Relegation to EFL League Two
22	Bristol Rovers (R)	46	12	7	27	44	76	−32	43	Relegation to EFL League Two
23	Cambridge United (R)	46	9	11	26	45	73	−28	38	Relegation to EFL League Two
24	Shrewsbury Town (R)	46	8	9	29	41	79	−38	33	Relegation to EFL League Two

Source: EFL Official Website
Rules for classification: 1) Points; 2) Goal difference; 3) Number of goals scored; 4) Head-to-head results; 5) Wins; 6) Away goals; 7) Penalty points (sec 9.5); 8) 12-point sending off offences
(R) Relegated

==== Results summary ====
Overall								Home						Away					
Pld	W	D	L	GF	GA	GD	Pts	W	D	L	GF	GA	GD	W	D	L	GF	GA	GD
46	12	7	27	44	76	−32	43	9	4	10	31	33	−2	3	3	17	13	43	−30

Last updated: 3 May 2025.
Source: Soccerway

==== Results by round ====
Round	1	2	3	4	5	6	7	8	9	10	12	13	14	15	16	17	11^{1}	18	18	21	22	23	24	25	27	28	29	30	26^{3}	32	31^{4}	33	34	35	36	19^{2}	37	38	39	40	41	42	43	44	45	46
Ground	H	A	A	H	A	H	A	H	H	A	A	H	A	H	H	A	H	A	A	H	A	A	H	A	H	A	A	H	H	H	A	A	H	A	H	H	A	A	H	H	A	H	A	H	H	A
Result	W	D	L	W	L	L	L	L	W	W	L	W	L	D	D	W	L	L	L	D	L	L	L	W	W	L	L	W	D	W	L	L	L	D	W	W	L	L	L	L	L	L	D	L	L	L
Position	9	8	14	9	9	14	19	21	18	18	18	15	16	16	14	13	14	15	20	19	19	20	20	20	18	18	19	18	19	17	18	19	20	20	20	17	20	20	20	20	20	21	21	21	22	22

Updated to match(es) played on 26 April 2025. Source: Soccerway
A = Away; H = Home; W = Win; D = Draw; L = Loss; P = Postponed
Notes:
- ^{1} Matchday 11 (vs. Blackpool) was postponed due to international call-ups.
- ^{2} Matchday 19 (vs. Bolton Wanderers) was postponed due to Storm Darragh.
- ^{3} Matchday 26 (vs. Stockport County) was postponed due to both sides involvements in the FA Cup.
- ^{4} Matchday 31 (vs. Wycombe Wanderers) was postponed due to Wycombe's involvements in the FA Cup.

==== Matches ====
On 26 June, the League One fixtures were announced.

Win Draw Loss Fixtures

10 August 2024 1	Bristol Rovers	1–0	Northampton Town	Horfield
17:30 BST	Griffiths (yellow card) 24'; Bilongo 90+2'	Report	Hoskins (yellow card) 90+1'; Fox (yellow card) 90+3'	Stadium: Memorial Stadium; Attendance: 8,529; Referee: Alex Chilowicz

17 August 2024 2	Rotherham United	0–0	Bristol Rovers	Rotherham
15:00 BST	MacDonald (yellow card) 12'; McCart (yellow card) 32'; Clarke-Harris (yellow card) 80'	Report	Sotiriou (yellow card) 44'; Moore (yellow card) 90'	Stadium: New York Stadium; Attendance: 9,414; Referee: Neil Hair

24 August 2024 3	Stockport County	2–0	Bristol Rovers	Edgeley
12:30 BST	Barry 39'; Wootton 64'	Report	Mola (yellow card) 28'; Conteh (yellow card) 45+2'; Garrett (yellow card) 90+1'	Stadium: Edgeley Park; Attendance: 9,423; Referee: Paul Howard
Note: Fixture was initially scheduled for a 15:00 kick-off, but was moved for live Sky Sports broadcast.

31 August 2024 4	Bristol Rovers	2–0	Cambridge United	Horfield
15:00 BST	Moore (yellow card) 29'; Omochere 30', 48'	Report	Andrew (yellow card) 55'	Stadium: Memorial Stadium; Attendance: 7,893; Referee: Craig Hicks

7 September 2024 5	Barnsley	2–1	Bristol Rovers	Barnsley
15:00 BST	Keillor-Dunn 11'; Earl (yellow card) 57'; Phillips 65'; Connell (yellow card) 90+3'; Roberts (yellow card) 90+6'	Report	Sotiriou 37'	Stadium: Oakwell; Attendance: 11,196; Referee: Edward Duckworth

14 September 2024 6	Bristol Rovers	0–4	Wigan Athletic	Horfield
15:00 BST	Moore (red card) 84'	Report	Hugill 20', 40'; Aasgaard (yellow card) 44' (goal) 50'; Chambers 71'	Stadium: Memorial Stadium; Attendance: 7,925; Referee: Scott Jackson

21 September 2024 7	Peterborough United	3–2	Bristol Rovers	Peterborough
15:00 BST	Poku 10'; Jones 33'; Mothersille 63'; Fernandez (yellow card) 66'	Report	Mola (yellow card) 12'; McCormick 74'; O'Donkor 76'	Stadium: London Road Stadium; Attendance: 8,006; Referee: Farai Hallam

28 September 2024 8	Bristol Rovers	1–2	Wycombe Wanderers	Horfield
15:00 BST	Sinclair 17'; Taylor (yellow card) 34'; O'Donkor (yellow card) 39'	Report	Harvie (yellow card) 20' (goal) 77'; Low 90+6'; Bakinson (yellow card) 90+7'	Stadium: Memorial Stadium; Attendance: 7,814; Referee: Martin Woods

1 October 2024 9	Bristol Rovers	3–2	Charlton Athletic	Horfield
19:45 BST	Conteh (yellow card) 11'; Sinclair 30'; Lindsay 57'; Wilson 67'	Report	Coventry (yellow card) 31'; Anderson (yellow card) 74'; Mitchell 79'; Godden 90+4'	Stadium: Memorial Stadium; Attendance: 6,638; Referee: David Rock

5 October 2024 10	Burton Albion	1–3	Bristol Rovers	Burton upon Trent
15:00 BST	Orsi 15'; Kalinauskas (yellow card) 39'; Webster (yellow card) 45+1'; Vancooten (red card) 82'; Cooper Love (yellow card) 88'	Report	Conteh (yellow card) 45'; Forde 52'; Mola 56'; O'Donkor (yellow card) 85'; Ward 90+3'	Stadium: Pirelli Stadium; Attendance: 2,832; Referee: Alan Young

19 October 2024 12	Huddersfield Town	3–1	Bristol Rovers	Huddersfield
15:00 BST	Pearson 34'; Marshall 38'; Radulović 52'; Lonwijk (yellow card) 69'	Report	Lindsay (yellow card) 21'; Sotiriou (yellow card) 67'; Hutchinson 69'	Stadium: John Smith's Stadium; Attendance: 18,179; Referee: Dean Whitestone

22 October 2024 13	Bristol Rovers	1–0	Shrewsbury Town	Horfield
19:45 BST	Lindsay (yellow card) 46' (goal) 52'; Mola (yellow card) 54'; Moore (yellow card) 62'; Omochere (yellow card) 82'	Report	Pierre (yellow card) 40'	Stadium: Memorial Stadium; Attendance: 6,361; Referee: Scott Simpson

26 October 2024 14	Reading	1–0	Bristol Rovers	Reading
12:30 BST	Smith 66'; Bindon (yellow card) 74'	Report	Omochere (yellow card) 20'; Forde (yellow card) 32' (yellow-red card) 55'; Hunt (yellow card) 88'; Moore (yellow card) 90+2'	Stadium: Madejski Stadium; Attendance: 12,843; Referee: Simon Mather
Note: Fixture was initially scheduled for a 15:00 kick-off, but was moved for live Sky Sports broadcast.

9 November 2024 15	Bristol Rovers	1–1	Lincoln City	Horfield
15:00 GMT	Forde 35' (yellow card) 74'; Wilson (yellow card) 45+2'; Moore (yellow card) 48'; Martin (yellow card) 61'	Report	Moylan (yellow card) 62' (goal) 64'; Montsma (yellow card) 90'	Stadium: Memorial Stadium; Attendance: 7,262; Referee: Dale Baines

16 November 2024 16	Bristol Rovers	0–0	Crawley Town	Horfield
15:00 GMT	Mola (yellow card) 58'; Sinclair (yellow card) 74'	Report	Anderson (yellow card) 22'; Barker (yellow card) 66'	Stadium: Memorial Stadium; Attendance: 7,411; Referee: Sam Allison

23 November 2024 17	Mansfield Town	0–1	Bristol Rovers	Mansfield
15:00 GMT	Reed (yellow card) 25'; Blake-Tracy (yellow card) 56'; Hewitt (yellow card) 90+3'	Report	Conteh (yellow card) 26'; McCormick 49' (yellow card) 57'	Stadium: Field Mill; Attendance: 7,357; Referee: Carl Brook

26 November 2024 11	Bristol Rovers	0–2	Blackpool	Horfield
19:45 GMT	Lindsay (yellow card) 40'; Moore (yellow card) 41'; Conteh (yellow card) 70'	Report	Norburn (yellow card) 22'; Bilongo 27' (o.g.); Offiah (yellow card) 45+1'; Evans 52' (pen.); Casey (yellow card) 66'; Husband (yellow card) 81'	Stadium: Memorial Stadium; Attendance: 6,342; Referee: Thomas Parsons

3 December 2024 18	Leyton Orient	3–0	Bristol Rovers	Leyton
19:45 GMT	Happe 17'; O'Neill 29'; Agyei 45+1'; Currie (yellow card) 78'	Report	Forbes (yellow card) 65'	Stadium: Brisbane Road; Attendance: 7,422; Referee: Jamie Linington

14 December 2024 20	Birmingham City	2–0	Bristol Rovers	Bordesley
15:00 GMT	Buchanan 6'; Stansfield 38' (pen.)	Report		Stadium: St Andrew's; Attendance: 26,459; Referee: Seb Stockbridge

21 December 2024 21	Bristol Rovers	1–1	Wrexham	Horfield
12:30 GMT	Thomas (yellow card) 45+1'; Lindsay (yellow card) 57'; Omochere 86'; Wilson (yellow card) 90+6'	Report	Lee 18'; O'Connell (yellow card) 48'; Palmer (yellow card) 45+5'; McClean (yellow card) 90+6'; Fletcher (yellow card) 90+6'	Stadium: Memorial Stadium; Attendance: 9,471; Referee: Lee Swabey
Note: Fixture was initially scheduled for a 15:00 kick-off, but was moved for live Sky Sports broadcast.

26 December 2024 22	Exeter City	3–1	Bristol Rovers	Exeter
15:00 GMT	Niskanen (yellow card) 13'; McDonald (yellow card) 44'; Fitzwater 72'; Alli 78'; J. Richards 90+6'	Report	Conteh (yellow card) 30'; Omochere 61'; Lindsay (yellow card) 68'	Stadium: St James Park; Attendance: 8,192 (1,042 away); Referee: Tom Reeves

29 December 2024 23	Stevenage	3–0	Bristol Rovers	Stevenage
15:00 GMT	List 34'; Roberts 54' (yellow card) 71'; Freestone (yellow card) 57'; Reid 88'	Report	Wilson (yellow card) 26'; Lindsay (yellow card) 22' (yellow-red card) 53'; McCormick (yellow card) 65'; Sousa (yellow card) 85'	Stadium: Broadhall Way; Attendance: 3,768; Referee: Edward Duckworth

1 January 2025 24	Bristol Rovers	2–3	Leyton Orient	Horfield
15:00 GMT	Martin 32' (pen.), 74'; Sotiriou (yellow card) 38'; Taylor (yellow card) 58'	Report	Galbraith 9'; Keeley (yellow card) 31'; Jaiyesimi (yellow card) 36'; Donley 39'; Kelman 53'; Happe (yellow card) 77'	Stadium: Memorial Stadium; Attendance: 7,887; Referee: Alan Young

4 January 2025 25	Cambridge United	0–1	Bristol Rovers	Cambridge
12:30 GMT	Smith (yellow card) 45+6'; Morrison (yellow card) 45+9' (yellow-red card) 90+3'; Stokes (yellow card) 90+7'	Report	Ward (yellow card) 8'; Thomas 26'; Sotiriou (yellow card) 45+9'; Wilson (yellow card) 90+3'; Hutchinson (yellow card) 90+7'	Stadium: Abbey Stadium; Attendance: 6,467; Referee: Sam Mulhall
Note: Fixture was initially scheduled for a 15:00 kick-off, but was moved for live Sky Sports broadcast.

18 January 2025 27	Bristol Rovers	3–1	Barnsley	Horfield
15:00 GMT	O'Donkor 41'; Hutchinson 52'; Wilson (yellow card) 66'; Sotiriou 85'	Report	Earl 67'	Stadium: Memorial Stadium; Attendance: 7,638; Referee: Martin Woods

25 January 2025 28	Wigan Athletic	2–0	Bristol Rovers	Wigan
15:00 GMT	Carragher 6'; Hungbo (yellow card) 32'; Smith 70'	Report	Wilson (yellow card) 40'; Sawyers (yellow card) 45+3'; Thomas (yellow card) 58'	Stadium: Brick Community Stadium; Attendance: 10,112; Referee: Scott Jackson

28 January 2025 29	Charlton Athletic	2–0	Bristol Rovers	Charlton
19:45 GMT	Godden 13'; Edwards 36'; Docherty (yellow card) 88'	Report	Mola (yellow card) 11'	Stadium: The Valley; Attendance: 11,149; Referee: Farai Hallam

2 February 2025 30	Bristol Rovers	3–1	Peterborough United	Horfield
15:00 GMT	Wilson 16'; Thomas (yellow card) 27'; Hutchinson 62' (yellow card) 90+4'; Sotiriou 83'	Report	Nevett (yellow card) 8'; Susoho (yellow card) 19'; Bilokapic (yellow card) 77'; Jones 90+1'	Stadium: Memorial Stadium; Attendance: 7,461; Referee: Ruebyn Ricardo
Note: Fixture was initially scheduled for 1 February, but was moved for live Sky Sports broadcasting.

11 February 2025 26	Bristol Rovers	1–1	Stockport County	Horfield
19:45 GMT	Hunt (yellow card) 14'; Martin (yellow card) 85'; Swinkels 90+1'	Report	Connolly (yellow card) 44'; Norwood (yellow card) 48'; Olaofe 53'	Stadium: Memorial Stadium; Attendance: 6,643; Referee: David Rock
Note: Fixture was initially scheduled for 11 January, but was rearranged due to both club's involvement in the FA Cup.

15 February 2025 32	Bristol Rovers	3–1	Burton Albion	Horfield
15:00 GMT	Martin 13' (yellow card) 35'; Thomas (yellow card) 69' (goal) 87'; Hutchinson 90+9'	Report	Chauke (yellow card) 66'; Tavares 82'; Bennett (yellow card) 90+5'	Stadium: Memorial Stadium; Attendance: 7,938; Referee: Thomas Kirk

18 February 2025 31	Wycombe Wanderers	2–0	Bristol Rovers	High Wycombe
19:45 GMT	Humphreys 51'; Udoh 59'; Harvie (yellow card) 89'	Report	Senior (yellow card) 26'; Forde (red card) 82'	Stadium: Adams Park
Note: Fixture was initially scheduled for 8 February, but was rearranged due to Wycombe's involvements in the FA Cup.

22 February 2025 33	Northampton Town	2–1	Bristol Rovers	Northampton
15:00 GMT	Costelloe 61'; Guinness-Walker 78'; McGeehan (yellow card) 80'; Pinnock (yellow card) 90+4'	Report	Sinclair 46'; Taylor (yellow card) 60'; Wilson (yellow card) 90+4'	Stadium: Sixfields Stadium; Attendance: 6,996; Referee: Matthew Russell

1 March 2025 34	Bristol Rovers	2–3	Rotherham United	Horfield
15:00 GMT	Sotiriou 5'; Martin (yellow card) 48'; Swinkels 72'; Butcher (yellow card) 85'; Thomas (yellow card) 90+1'	Report	Nombe 36', 90+2'; Jules 52'	Stadium: Memorial Stadium; Attendance: 7,799; Referee: Edward Duckworth

4 March 2025 35	Shrewsbury Town	0–0	Bristol Rovers	Shrewsbury
19:45 GMT	Stewart (yellow card) 90+1'; Biggins (yellow card) 90+3'; Gilliead (yellow card) 90+3'	Report	Sotiriou (yellow card) 90+3'; Martin (yellow card) 90+3'	Stadium: New Meadow; Attendance: 5,257; Referee: Simon Mather

8 March 2025 36	Bristol Rovers	1–0	Huddersfield Town	Horfield
15:00 GMT	Sotiriou 10'; Swinkels (yellow card) 72'	Report	Hodge (yellow card) 63'; Taylor (yellow card) 72'	Stadium: Memorial Stadium; Attendance: 7,705; Referee: Tom Reeves

11 March 2025 19	Bristol Rovers	3–2	Bolton Wanderers	Horfield
19:45 GMT	Martin 6' (pen.), 63'; Taylor 88'; Forde (yellow card) 90+2'; Swinkels (yellow card) 90+4'	Report	Morley 38'; McAtee 70'	Stadium: Memorial Stadium; Attendance: 7,644; Referee: Carl Brook
Note: Fixture was originally scheduled for 7 December, but was postponed due to Storm Darragh.

15 March 2025 37	Lincoln City	5–0	Bristol Rovers	Lincoln
15:00 GMT	Makama 31', 65', 81'; Bayliss 49'; Collins 52'	Report	Wilson (yellow card) 83'	Stadium: Sincil Bank; Attendance: 8,506; Referee: Paul Howard

22 March 2025 38	Crawley Town	1–0	Bristol Rovers	Crawley
15:00 GMT	Doyle 19'; Barker (yellow card) 32'; Lo-Tutala (yellow card) 83'	Report	Wilson (yellow card) 45'	Stadium: Broadfield Stadium; Attendance: 4,421; Referee: Thomas Parsons

29 March 2025 39	Bristol Rovers	1–2	Mansfield Town	Horfield
15:00 BST	Sawyers 26'	Report	Vickers 1'; Oshilaja (yellow card) 12'; Boateng (yellow card) 21'; Reed (yellow card) 43'; Dwyer 59'; Baccus (yellow card) 89'	Stadium: Memorial Stadium; Attendance: 9,067; Referee: Scott Tallis

1 April 2025 40	Bristol Rovers	1–2	Birmingham City	Horfield
20:00 BST	O'Donkor 19'; Ward (yellow card) 48'; Shaw (yellow card) 56'; Sotiriou (yellow card) 84'; Taylor (yellow card) 90'	Report	Anderson 3'; Davies (yellow card) 59'; Stansfield 85' (pen.)	Stadium: Memorial Stadium; Attendance: 8,088; Referee: Oliver Yates
Note: Fixture was initially scheduled for a 19:45 kick-off, but was moved for live Sky Sports broadcasting.

5 April 2025 41	Bolton Wanderers	1–0	Bristol Rovers	Horwich
15:00 BST	Collins 76'	Report	Butcher (yellow card) 30'	Stadium: Toughsheet Community Stadium; Attendance: 22,422; Referee: Anthony Backhouse

12 April 2025 42	Bristol Rovers	1–2	Exeter City	Horfield
15:00 BST	Sotiriou 70'; Sawyers (yellow card) 90+1'	Report	Watts 11' (yellow card) 56'; McDonald (yellow card) 32'; Cole 42'; Whitworth (yellow card) 79'; McMillan (yellow card) 87'	Stadium: Memorial Stadium; Attendance: 9,508; Referee: Matthew Russell

18 April 2025 43	Wrexham	1–1	Bristol Rovers	Wrexham
15:00 BST	James 76'	Report	Moore 32'; Thomas (yellow card) 49'; Forde (yellow card) 74'	Stadium: Racecourse Ground; Attendance: 12,740; Referee: Martin Coy

21 April 2025 44	Bristol Rovers	0–1	Stevenage	Horfield
15:00 BST	Moore (yellow card) 45+2'	Report	Reid 12'; List (yellow card) 49'; Thompson (yellow card) 53'	Stadium: Memorial Stadium; Attendance: 9,192; Referee: Leigh Doughty

26 April 2025 45	Bristol Rovers	0–2	Reading	Horfield
12:30 BST	Sotiriou (yellow card) 90'	Report	Wing 67'; Campbell 90+4'	Stadium: Memorial Stadium; Attendance: 9,035; Referee: Simon Mather
Note: Fixture was initially scheduled for a 15:00 kick-off, but was moved for live Sky Sports broadcasting.

3 May 2025 46	Blackpool	4–1	Bristol Rovers	Blackpool
15:00 BST	Bloxham 40'; Morgan 55'; Ennis 76'; Finnigan 89'	Report	O'Donkor 18'; Butcher (yellow card) 69'	Stadium: Bloomfield Road; Attendance: 10,534; Referee: Ben Speedie

=== FA Cup ===
The draw for the First Round was made on 14 October 2024. The draw for the Second Round was made on 3 November 2024. The draw for the Third Round was made on 2 December 2024.

2 November 2024 First round	Bristol Rovers	3–1 (a.e.t.)	Weston-super-Mare	Horfield
15:00 GMT	Lindsay 42'; Taylor 95'; Ward (yellow card) 120' (goal) 120+2'	Report	Pope (yellow card) 50'; Bastin 64'; Coulson (yellow card) 73'; Chamberlain (yellow card) 90+3'; Kadji (yellow card) 94'; McCootie (yellow card) 105'; Avery (yellow card) 120'	Stadium: Memorial Stadium; Attendance: 6,898; Referee: Ollie Yates

30 November 2024 Second round	Barnsley	0–0 (a.e.t.) (3–4 p)	Bristol Rovers	Barnsley
15:00 GMT		Report		Stadium: Oakwell; Attendance: 4,801; Referee: Scott Oldham
	Penalties
	Phillips (penalty missed); Cosgrove (penalty scored); Russell (penalty scored); Jaló (penalty scored); Earl (penalty missed)		Martin (penalty scored); Sotiriou (penalty scored); Sinclair (penalty scored); Forde (penalty scored)

12 January 2025 Third round	Ipswich Town	3–0	Bristol Rovers	Ipswich
15:00 GMT	Phillips 18'; Clarke 24'; Taylor 37'	Report	Ward (yellow card) 90+1'	Stadium: Portman Road; Attendance: 27,678; Referee: Oliver Langford

=== EFL Cup ===
On 27 June, the draw for the first round was made, with Bristol Rovers being drawn away against Cardiff City.

Win Draw Loss Fixtures

13 August 2024 First round	Cardiff City	2–0	Bristol Rovers	Cardiff
19:45 BST	McGuinness (yellow card) 32' (goal) 68'; Colwill 90+1'	Report	Anthony (yellow card) 77'	Stadium: Cardiff City Stadium; Attendance: 5,718; Referee: Charles Breakspear

=== EFL Trophy ===
In the group stage, Bristol Rovers were drawn into Southern Group G alongside Exeter City, Swindon Town and Tottenham Hotspur U21.

Pos	Div	Team	Pld	W	PW	PL	L	GF	GA	GD	Pts	Qualification
1	L1	Exeter City	3	3	0	0	0	7	3	+4	9	Advance to Round 2
2	L2	Swindon Town	3	2	0	0	1	7	3	+4	6	Advance to Round 2
3	ACA	Tottenham Hotspur U21	3	0	1	0	2	4	7	−3	2	
4	L1	Bristol Rovers	3	0	0	1	2	5	10	−5	1	

Source: EFL

20 August 2024 Group stage	Bristol Rovers	3–3 (5–6 p)	Tottenham Hotspur U21	Horfield
19:00 BST	Hutchinson 8'; Forbes (yellow card) 50'; Shaw 56'; McCormick 76'; Senior (yellow card) 90+7'		Lankshear 27'; Moore 50' (yellow card) 69'; McKnight (yellow card) 53'; Ajayi 70'	Stadium: Memorial Stadium; Attendance: 1,584; Referee: James Oldham
	Penalties
	Senior (penalty scored); Hutchinson (penalty scored); McCormick (penalty scored); Sotiriou (penalty scored); Taylor (penalty scored); Garrett (penalty missed)		Moore (penalty scored); Hall (penalty scored); Williams (penalty scored); Cassanova (penalty scored); McKnight (penalty scored); Irow (penalty scored)

8 October 2024 Group stage	Swindon Town	4–0	Bristol Rovers	Swindon
19:00 BST	Glatzel 2', 12'; McGregor 30'; Ameen 35'	Report	Hutchinson (yellow card) 28'; McCormick (yellow card) 59'	Stadium: County Ground; Attendance: 1,306; Referee: Sam Mulhall

29 October 2024 Group stage	Bristol Rovers	2–3	Exeter City	Horfield
19:00 GMT	Taylor 31'; Bilongo (yellow card) 33'; Hutchinson 67'; Forde (yellow card) 90'	Report	Bird 19'; Watts (yellow card) 35'; Francis (yellow card) 42'; Alli 49'; Mitchell 88'	Stadium: Memorial Stadium; Attendance: 1,257; Referee: Matthew Russell

== Statistics ==
Players with squad numbers struck through and marked † left the club during the playing season.
Players with names in italics and marked * were on loan from another club for the whole of their season with Bristol Rovers.

=== Appearances and goals ===
As of match played 3 May 2025

Players with no appearances are not included on the list

No.	Pos	Nat	Player	Total		League One		FA Cup		EFL Cup		EFL Trophy	
No.	Pos	Nat	Player	Apps	Goals	Apps	Goals	Apps	Goals	Apps	Goals	Apps	Goals
2	DF	(England) ENG	Joel Senior	23	0	6+13	0	1+1	0	1+0	0	1+0	0
3	DF	(England) ENG	Lino Sousa	29	0	14+11	0	1+0	0	0+0	0	3+0	0
4	DF	(England) ENG	Taylor Moore	38	1	25+8	1	3+0	0	0+0	0	1+1	0
5	DF	(Wales) WAL	James Wilson	49	2	46+0	2	1+1	0	0+0	0	0+1	0
6	DF	(England) ENG	Clinton Mola	37	1	29+5	1	2+0	0	1+0	0	0+0	0
7	FW	(England) ENG	Scott Sinclair	45	3	20+22	3	1+1	0	1+0	0	0+0	0
8	MF	(England) ENG	Grant Ward	38	2	22+13	1	1+2	1	0+0	0	0+0	0
9	FW	(Republic of Ireland) IRL	Promise Omochere	24	4	16+6	4	0+0	0	1+0	0	0+1	0
10	FW	(Cyprus) CYP	Ruel Sotiriou	44	6	32+6	6	2+1	0	0+1	0	0+2	0
11	FW	(England) ENG	Luke Thomas	40	2	20+15	2	0+2	0	1+0	0	2+0	0
14	MF	(Saint Kitts and Nevis) SKN	Romaine Sawyers	14	1	9+4	1	1+0	0	0+0	0	0+0	0
17	DF	(England) ENG	Connor Taylor	48	3	38+4	1	2+0	1	1+0	0	3+0	1
18	FW	(England) ENG	Chris Martin	28	5	16+7	5	2+1	0	0+0	0	2+0	0
19	MF	(England) ENG	Isaac Hutchinson	43	6	22+15	4	2+1	0	0+0	0	3+0	2
21	FW	(England) ENG	Micah Anthony	3	0	0+0	0	0+0	0	0+1	0	1+1	0
22	MF	(Sierra Leone) SLE	Kamil Conteh	22	0	18+1	0	2+0	0	0+1	0	0+0	0
23	MF	(England) ENG	Luke McCormick	25	3	8+11	2	1+1	0	1+0	0	3+0	1
24	FW	(England) ENG	Gatlin O'Donkor	31	4	14+14	4	1+1	0	0+0	0	1+0	0
25	DF	(Netherlands) NED	Sil Swinkels	14	2	10+4	2	0+0	0	0+0	0	0+0	0
26	MF	(England) ENG	Matt Butcher	18	0	17+1	0	0+0	0	0+0	0	0+0	0
27	DF	(England) ENG	Bryant Bilongo	18	1	11+3	1	0+1	0	0+1	0	2+0	0
28	FW	(England) ENG	Shaq Forde	34	2	14+17	2	2+0	0	0+0	0	0+1	0
29	MF	(Scotland) SCO	Jamie Lindsay	33	3	18+10	2	2+1	1	1+0	0	1+0	0
30	FW	(England) ENG	Michael Reindorf	4	0	0+4	0	0+0	0	0+0	0	0+0	0
31	GK	(England) ENG	Jed Ward	18	0	18+0	0	0+0	0	0+0	0	0+0	0
32	DF	(England) ENG	Jack Hunt	21	0	16+4	0	1+0	0	0+0	0	0+0	0
35	GK	(England) ENG	Matt Hall	2	0	0+0	0	0+0	0	0+0	0	2+0	0
37	MF	(England) ENG	Kofi Shaw	18	1	12+3	0	0+0	0	0+1	0	2+0	1
43	FW	(Wales) WAL	Ollie Dewsbury	7	0	1+5	0	0+0	0	0+0	0	0+1	0
Player(s) who featured whilst on loan but returned to parent club on loan during the season:
1	GK	(England) ENG	Josh Griffiths	33	0	28+0	0	3+0	0	1+0	0	1+0	0
14	MF	(England) ENG	Jake Garrett	11	0	3+4	0	0+0	0	1+0	0	3+0	0
25	DF	(Northern Ireland) NIR	Michael Forbes	12	0	2+5	0	1+1	0	1+0	0	2+0	0

=== Goals Record ===
As of match played 3 May 2025

Rank	No.	Nat.	Po.	Name	League One	FA Cup	League Cup	League Trophy	Total
1	10	(Cyprus)	CF	Ruel Sotiriou	6	0	0	0	6
1	19	(England)	CM	Isaac Hutchinson	4	0	0	2	6
3	18	(Scotland)	CF	Chris Martin	5	0	0	0	5
4	9	(Republic of Ireland)	CF	Promise Omochere	4	0	0	0	4
4	24	(England)	CF	Gatlin O'Donkor	4	0	0	0	4
6	7	(England)	LW	Scott Sinclair	3	0	0	0	3
6	17	(England)	CB	Connor Taylor	1	1	0	1	3
6	23	(England)	CM	Luke McCormick	2	0	0	1	3
6	29	(Scotland)	CM	Jamie Lindsay	2	1	0	0	3
10	5	(Wales)	CB	James Wilson	2	0	0	0	2
10	8	(England)	CM	Grant Ward	1	1	0	0	2
10	11	(England)	RW	Luke Thomas	2	0	0	0	2
10	25	(Netherlands)	CB	Sil Swinkels	2	0	0	0	2
10	28	(England)	RW	Shaq Forde	2	0	0	0	2
15	4	(England)	CB	Taylor Moore	1	0	0	0	1
15	6	(England)	CB	Clinton Mola	1	0	0	0	1
15	14	(Saint Kitts and Nevis)	CM	Romaine Sawyers	1	0	0	0	1
15	27	(England)	LB	Bryant Bilongo	1	0	0	0	1
15	37	(England)	CM	Kofi Shaw	0	0	0	1	1
Total					44	3	0	5	52

=== Disciplinary record ===
As of match played 3 May 2025

Rank	No.	Nat.	Po.	Name	League One			FA Cup			League Cup			League Trophy			Total		
Rank	No.	Nat.	Po.	Name	Yellow card	(yellow card) (yellow-red card)	Red card	Yellow card	(yellow card) (yellow-red card)	Red card	Yellow card	(yellow card) (yellow-red card)	Red card	Yellow card	(yellow card) (yellow-red card)	Red card	Yellow card	(yellow card) (yellow-red card)	Red card
1	5	(Wales)	CB	James Wilson	9	0	0	0	0	0	0	0	0	0	0	0	9	0	0
2	4	(England)	CB	Taylor Moore	7	0	1	0	0	0	0	0	0	0	0	0	7	0	1
3	10	(Cyprus)	CF	Ruel Sotiriou	7	0	0	0	0	0	0	0	0	0	0	0	7	0	0
4	11	(England)	RW	Luke Thomas	6	0	0	0	0	0	0	0	0	0	0	0	6	0	0
4	22	(Sierra Leone)	CM	Kamil Conteh	6	0	0	0	0	0	0	0	0	0	0	0	6	0	0
4	28	(England)	RW	Shaq Forde	3	1	1	0	0	0	0	0	0	1	0	0	4	1	1
4	29	(Scotland)	CM	Jamie Lindsay	5	1	0	0	0	0	0	0	0	0	0	0	5	1	0
8	6	(England)	CB	Clinton Mola	5	0	0	0	0	0	0	0	0	0	0	0	5	0	0
8	18	(Scotland)	CF	Chris Martin	5	0	0	0	0	0	0	0	0	0	0	0	5	0	0
10	17	(England)	CB	Connor Taylor	4	0	0	0	0	0	0	0	0	0	0	0	4	0	0
11	8	(England)	CM	Grant Ward	1	0	0	2	0	0	0	0	0	0	0	0	3	0	0
11	19	(England)	CM	Isaac Hutchinson	2	0	0	0	0	0	0	0	0	1	0	0	3	0	0
11	23	(England)	CM	Luke McCormick	2	0	0	0	0	0	0	0	0	1	0	0	3	0	0
11	26	(England)	CM	Matt Butcher	3	0	0	0	0	0	0	0	0	0	0	0	3	0	0
15	2	(England)	RB	Joel Senior	1	0	0	0	0	0	0	0	0	1	0	0	2	0	0
15	9	(Republic of Ireland)	CF	Promise Omochere	2	0	0	0	0	0	0	0	0	0	0	0	2	0	0
15	14	(Saint Kitts and Nevis)	CM	Romaine Sawyers	2	0	0	0	0	0	0	0	0	0	0	0	2	0	0
15	24	(England)	CF	Gatlin O'Donkor	2	0	0	0	0	0	0	0	0	0	0	0	2	0	0
15	25	(Northern Ireland)	CB	Michael Forbes	1	0	0	0	0	0	0	0	0	1	0	0	2	0	0
15	25	(Netherlands)	CB	Sil Swinkels	2	0	0	0	0	0	0	0	0	0	0	0	2	0	0
15	32	(England)	RB	Jack Hunt	2	0	0	0	0	0	0	0	0	0	0	0	2	0	0
22	1	(England)	GK	Josh Griffiths	1	0	0	0	0	0	0	0	0	0	0	0	1	0	0
22	3	(England)	LB	Lino Sousa	1	0	0	0	0	0	0	0	0	0	0	0	1	0	0
22	7	(England)	LW	Scott Sinclair	1	0	0	0	0	0	0	0	0	0	0	0	1	0	0
22	14	(England)	CM	Jake Garrett	1	0	0	0	0	0	0	0	0	0	0	0	1	0	0
22	21	(England)	LW	Micah Anthony	0	0	0	0	0	0	1	0	0	0	0	0	1	0	0
22	27	(England)	LB	Bryant Bilongo	0	0	0	0	0	0	0	0	0	1	0	0	1	0	0
22	31	(England)	GK	Jed Ward	1	0	0	0	0	0	0	0	0	0	0	0	1	0	0
22	37	(England)	CM	Kofi Shaw	1	0	0	0	0	0	0	0	0	0	0	0	1	0	0
Total					82	2	2	2	0	0	1	0	0	6	0	0	91	2	2
