= Bassaleg School =

Location
- Forge Lane; Newport, NP10 8NF; Wales; 51.574722°N 3.043333°W

Information
- Type: Comprehensive school
- Motto: Believing and Belonging
- Established: c.1880
- Local authority: Newport City Council
- Chairperson: David Williams
- Head teacher: Victoria Lambe
- Gender: Mixed
- Age: 11 to 18
- Enrolment: 1,749 as of 2019
- Colour: Black Gold
- Website: http://www.bassalegschool.com

Bassaleg School (Welsh: Ysgol Basaleg) is a comprehensive secondary school for pupils aged 11 to 18 years, situated in the village of Bassaleg on the western side of the city of Newport, Wales. The present buildings of the school range in age from the early 20th century to the present day. The buildings form a natural campus, with playing fields, lawns and gardens. It has over 1,700 pupils.

== History ==
There has been a school around the current site since 1880, when Rowland Morgan endowed £20 for its creation. (Note: £20 in 1880 equates to approximately £2,000 in 2025, according to calculations based on the Consumer Price Index measure of inflation.) In the early twentieth-century, Bassaleg Controlled Voluntary School was built in its place to serve the families of the workers of Lord Tredegar's estate. Forge Building, as it is commonly referred, was opened in completed 1935, by which time the school was known as Bassaleg Secondary School.

The then Lord Tredegar frequented the new school, hosting prize-giving, and for many years to deliver gifts to the children at Christmastime.

During the Second World War, five teachers and around 250 past students were serving in the forces, while forty older male students formed the "School Harvest Camp"; sleeping in the recently built gymnasium and farming the surrounding land for six weeks. By 1948, the school had become known as Bassaleg Grammar School.

In 1958, Graig County Secondary Modern was established on the same site. The Secondary Modern's main building was erected adjacent to Griffin Lane, thus known as Griffin Building. Following the abolition of grammar schools in England and Wales and their replacement by the comprehensive system in 1976, the two schools on the site merged into Bassaleg Comprehensive School, as it is known today.

On 18 November 2020, access to and from the school was temporarily disrupted when a Second World War bomb was discovered at a house in the village of Bassaleg. Pupils remained at the school until the bomb was removed the same day.

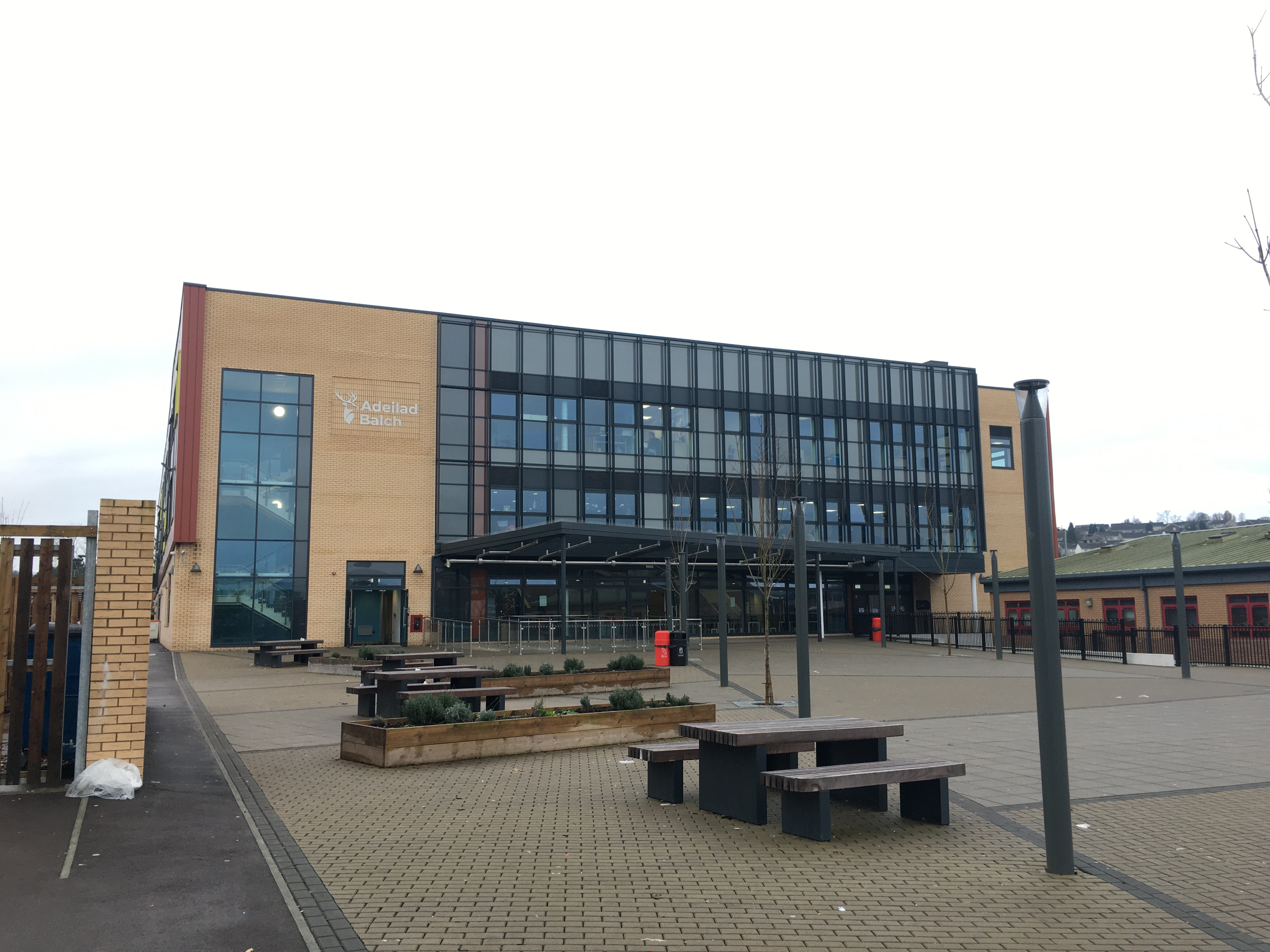
Adeilad Balch in 2024.

Because of expanding residential development in the area, consultations took place in 2021 to 2022 to increase capacity to over 2,000 pupils by 2023. Plans for building expansion were approved by Newport City Council in February 2022 with work beginning in March 2022, following a £30,000,000 investment. The contractors for the work were Willmott Dixon. The main development, a new building called Adeilad Balch (English: Pride Building), was opened in October 2024.

In 2023, during the building works, the school renamed its buildings in Welsh; each reflecting one of the school's values. The new names include Caredig, Parchus, Dewr, Balch, Uniondeb, and Gwydn, meaning Kindness, Respect, Bravery, Pride, Integrity, and Resilience respectively.

== Architecture ==
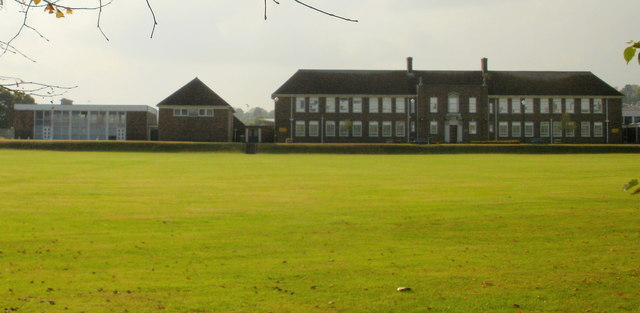
Forge Building from Forge Road, 2009.

The oldest building on the current site, commonly known as Forge Building and viewable from Forge Road, was completed in 1935. John Newman, in his Gwent/Monmouthshire volume in the Pevsner Buildings of Wales series, gives the architect for the building as John Bain. The building is constructed symmetrically of brown brick, with the centre three bays projecting slightly from the rest of the façade. The roof is hipped. The central stone door case is framed by Corinthian pilasters.

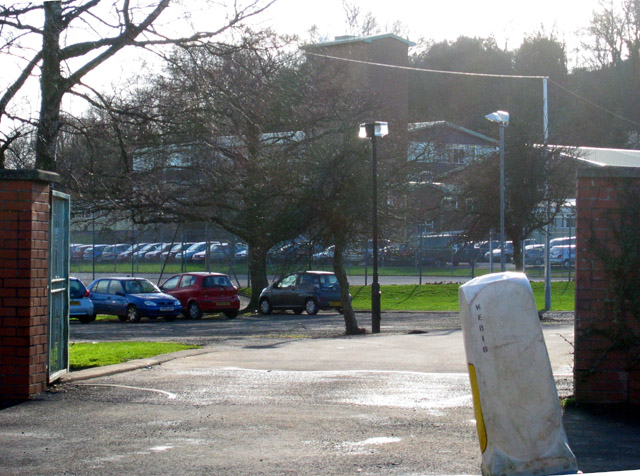
Griffin Building (background) from Griffin Lane, 2007. Now demolished.

Demolished during building works in 2023, Griffin Building was situated adjacent to Griffin Lane at the rear of the site and was completed in 1958. Newman states it as having "all the hallmarks of the quietly Modernist idiom of Colin Jones, Monmouthshire County Architect." A. Arthur and Son Ltd. were the main contractors for its construction. The main classroom building was three-storey. Connected to this were a hall and other classroom blocks, near which was a "tall rectangular brick tower", all of caramel brick. These adjoining structures remain despite the demolition of the three-storey main classroom building.

== Notable staff and former pupils ==
=== Pupils ===
- Stuart Barnes, Times journalist and former Bath, England and British Lions rugby player
- Jon Callard, former Bath and England rugby player
- Sabrina Cohen-Hatton, Chief Fire Officer of the West Sussex Fire and Rescue Service, homeless whilst studying at the school
- Jamie Corsi, rugby player
- John Davies, Bishop of Swansea and Brecon in the Church in Wales and Archbishop of Wales
- David Davies, former Conservative MP for Monmouth and Secretary of State for Wales
- Ron Davies, Former AM and MP and Secretary of State for Wales
- Rio Dyer, rugby player for Dragons RFC and Wales
- Sir Anthony Evans, Judge and Lord Justice of Appeal
- Anneliese Heard, triathlete
- Liz Johnson, Paralympic gold medallist
- Ryan Jones, former Wales and British Lions rugby player
- Roger Lewis, writer and journalist, author of The Life and Death of Peter Sellers
- Alix Popham, former Welsh national rugby player
- Malcolm Thomas a former Welsh and British Lions rugby player who played club rugby for Newport and won 27 caps for Wales during the 1950s
- Aaron Wainwright, current Welsh national rugby player
- Amelia Womack, Deputy Leader Green Party of England and Wales
- Ollie Dewsbury, under-19s international footballer for Wales

=== Staff ===
- Ryan Doble, former under-21 international footballer for Wales
- Justin Thomas, former International rugby union player for Wales
- Lauren Parfitt, Welsh cricketer and current captain for Wales

== Sources ==
- Clark, Gregory (2023). "The Annual RPI and Average Earnings for Britain, 1209 to Present (New Series)". MeasuringWorth.
