= Sabrina Cohen-Hatton =

Welsh firefighter and writer

Sabrina Cohen-Hatton KFSM
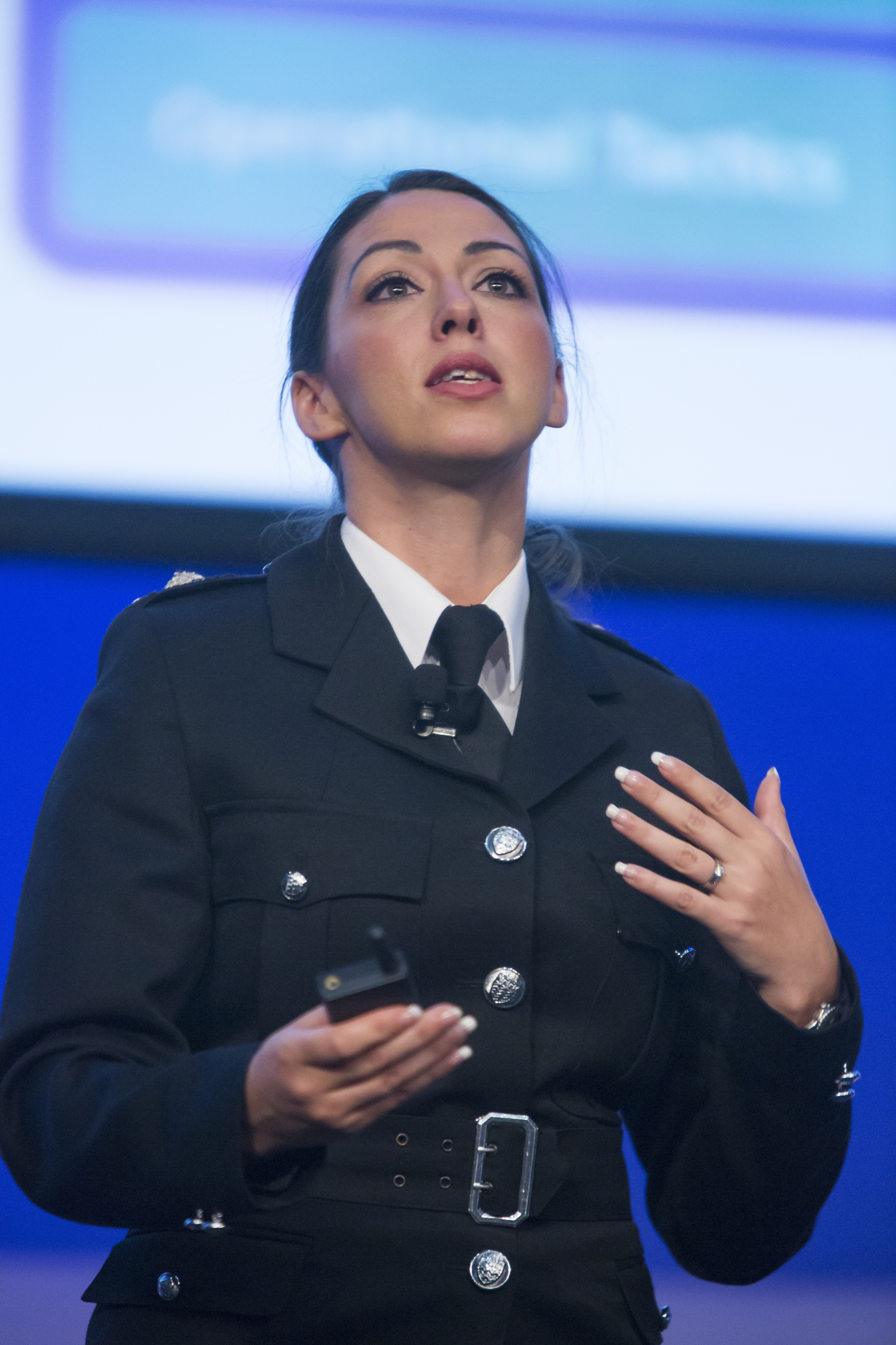
- Cohen-Hatton in September 2017
- Born: Sabrina Rachel Cohen; 1983 (age 42–43)
- Education: Bassaleg School; Open University (BSc); Cardiff University (PhD)
- Known for: Firefighting; Neuroscience
- Scientific career
- Workplaces: West Sussex Fire and Rescue Service
- Thesis: Understanding the origin of Pavlovian-instrumental interactions (2013)
- Website: profiles.cardiff.ac.uk/honorary/cohensr

Sabrina Rachel Cohen-Hatton KFSM (born 1983) is a Welsh firefighter, psychologist and writer. She is chief fire officer of the Hampshire and Isle of Wight Fire and Rescue Service. In 2019, she was selected as one of Marie Claire's Future-Shapers and featured on Desert Island Discs.

== Early life and education ==
Cohen-Hatton was born and raised in Marshfield, Newport, South Wales. She attended Bassaleg School. Her mother is of Jewish heritage and her father was born in Israel to Moroccan-Jewish parents, but the family did not mix with the local Jewish community or attend synagogue, and her father is buried in a nearby Jewish cemetery.

Sometime after her father's death, at age 15, Cohen-Hatton became homeless. She says that Bassaleg School was aware she was not living at home but did not help her. During this period she sold The Big Issue and slept rough in Newport, Wales. At the end of her school years, she slept in a derelict building, and while living on the streets she endured antisemitic abuse. For roughly two years she either slept rough or lived in insecure accommodation, at times spending nights in a van, and it took several attempts before she secured stable housing.

In 2001, Cohen-Hatton joined the South Wales Fire and Rescue Service, becoming the first woman firefighter at her station. While serving as a firefighter, she completed a bachelor's degree in psychology with the Open University, and in 2013 she was awarded a PhD in behavioural neuroscience from Cardiff University. She later became an ambassador for The Big Issue, and has said the organisation saved her life.

== Career ==
Cohen-Hatton's husband is also a firefighter. In an interview, she recalled a moment where she had responded to a fire and found a horrifically injured firefighter whom she thought was her husband. It was not, and she credits that experience to promoting her interest in reducing human error and making firefighters safer. This was also the driver for her to study psychology.

Following her PhD, Cohen-Hatton began to lead research on behalf of the National Fire Chiefs Council (then CFOA). Her research project fitted helmet cameras to incident commanders as they went out on incidents. Her research identified that 80% of decisions made by firefighters were due to gut instinct, with the other 20% due to an analytical approach.

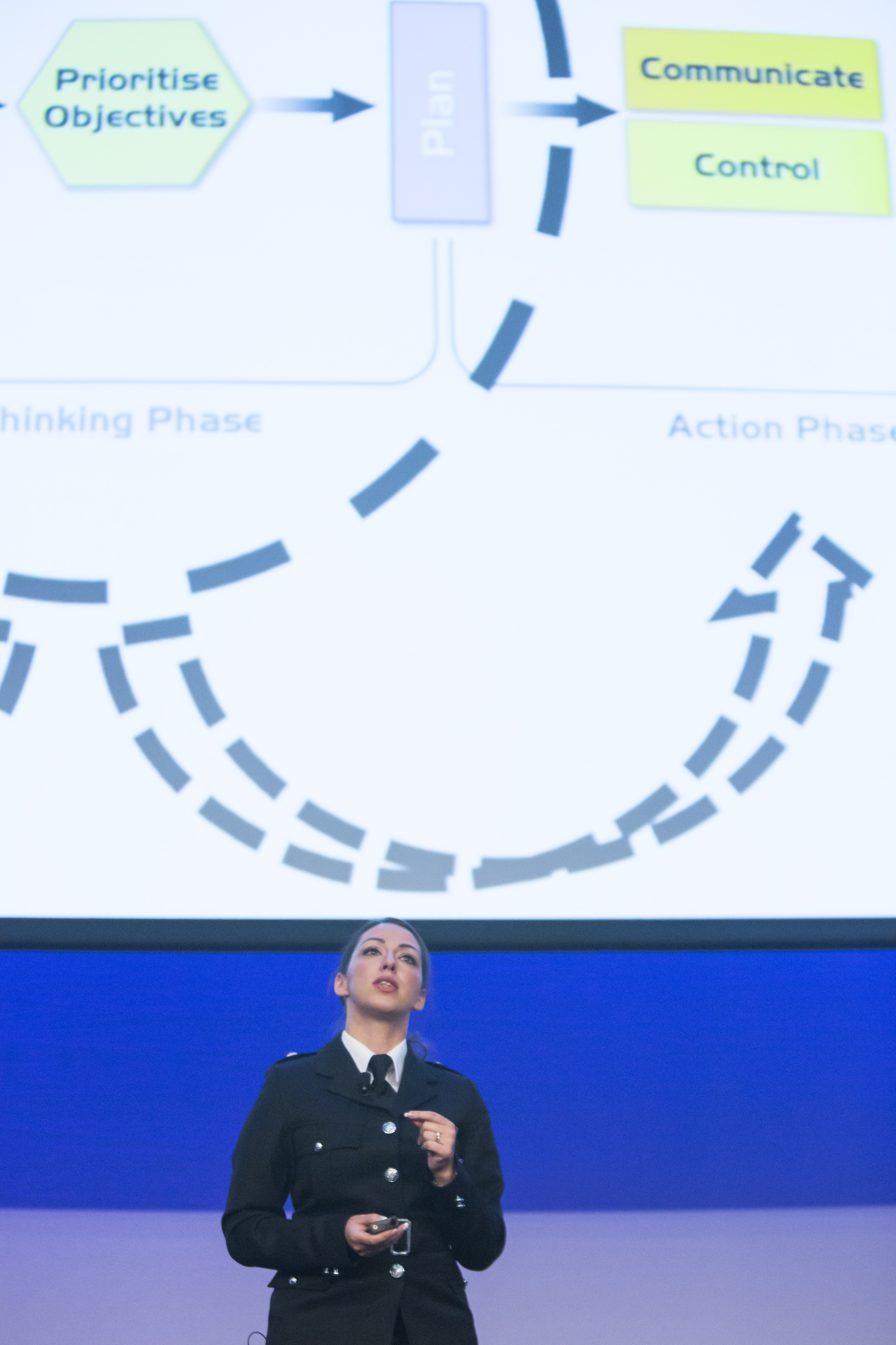
Cohen-Hatton presenting her ideas in Sydney

Cohen-Hatton's research resulted in a new decision control process that helps commanders consider goals, consequences and risks that they take under pressure. She found that if firefighters took part in goal-oriented training the number of commanders operating at the most significant level of situation awareness increased up to five times.

As part of her research, Cohen-Hatton investigated different training interventions, including virtual reality, firehouse training and live burn. She completed her PhD. Her work helped to shape national fire service policy and informed the National Fire Chiefs Council. She co-supervises a research group at Cardiff University with Rob Honey, supported by the National Fire Chiefs Council, that considers decision making in the emergency service environment.

Only 3.1% of firefighters in Britain are women, and Cohen-Hatton has worked to inspire girls to become firefighters. She was assistant commissioner seconded to Her Majesty's Inspectorate of Constabulary and Fire & Rescue Services and as deputy assistant commissioner for the London Fire Brigade. Her first book, The Heat of the Moment, was published by Penguin Books in 2019. She was appointed chief fire officer of the West Sussex Fire and Rescue Service in 2019.

In September 2019, Cohen-Hatton was a guest on BBC Radio 4's Desert Island Discs, choosing "Bankrobber" by The Clash, The Old Man and the Sea by Ernest Hemingway, and a photo album as her selected favourite song, book, and luxury item respectively.

Cohen-Hatton was appointed as the new chief fire officer to lead Hampshire and Isle of Wight Fire and Rescue Service from September 2025, becoming the organisation’s first female chief.

=== Awards and honours ===
- 2013 Cardiff University Jury Research Prize
- 2014 FIRE/GORE Research Excellence prize
- 2016 American Psychological Association Early Career Award from the Society for Experimental Psychology and Cognitive Science
- 2017 People's Choice Award at the Cardiff University Innovation and Impact Awards
- 2018 Biotechnology and Biological Sciences Research Council (BBSRC) Innovator of the Year award
- 2018 American Psychological Association Raymond Nickerson Best Paper Award
- 2018 Honorary Fellowship at Cardiff University
- 2018 Cosmopolitan Millennial Power List
- 2019 Marie Claire "Future Shaper"
- 2020 The Big Issue Top 100 Changemakers list, Top Campaigner
- 2020 Jewish Care Woman of Distinction
- 2021 Honorary Doctor of Science Award at Royal Holloway University
- 2022 Honorary degree of Doctor of the University, conferred by the Open University in Wales
- 2024 King's Fire Service Medal (KFSM) in the 2024 Birthday Honours

== Personal life ==
Cohen-Hatton is married to firefighter Mike Hatton and they have a daughter. She keeps Xolo dogs.
