= James Wilson (footballer, born 1989) =

Welsh footballer (born 1989)

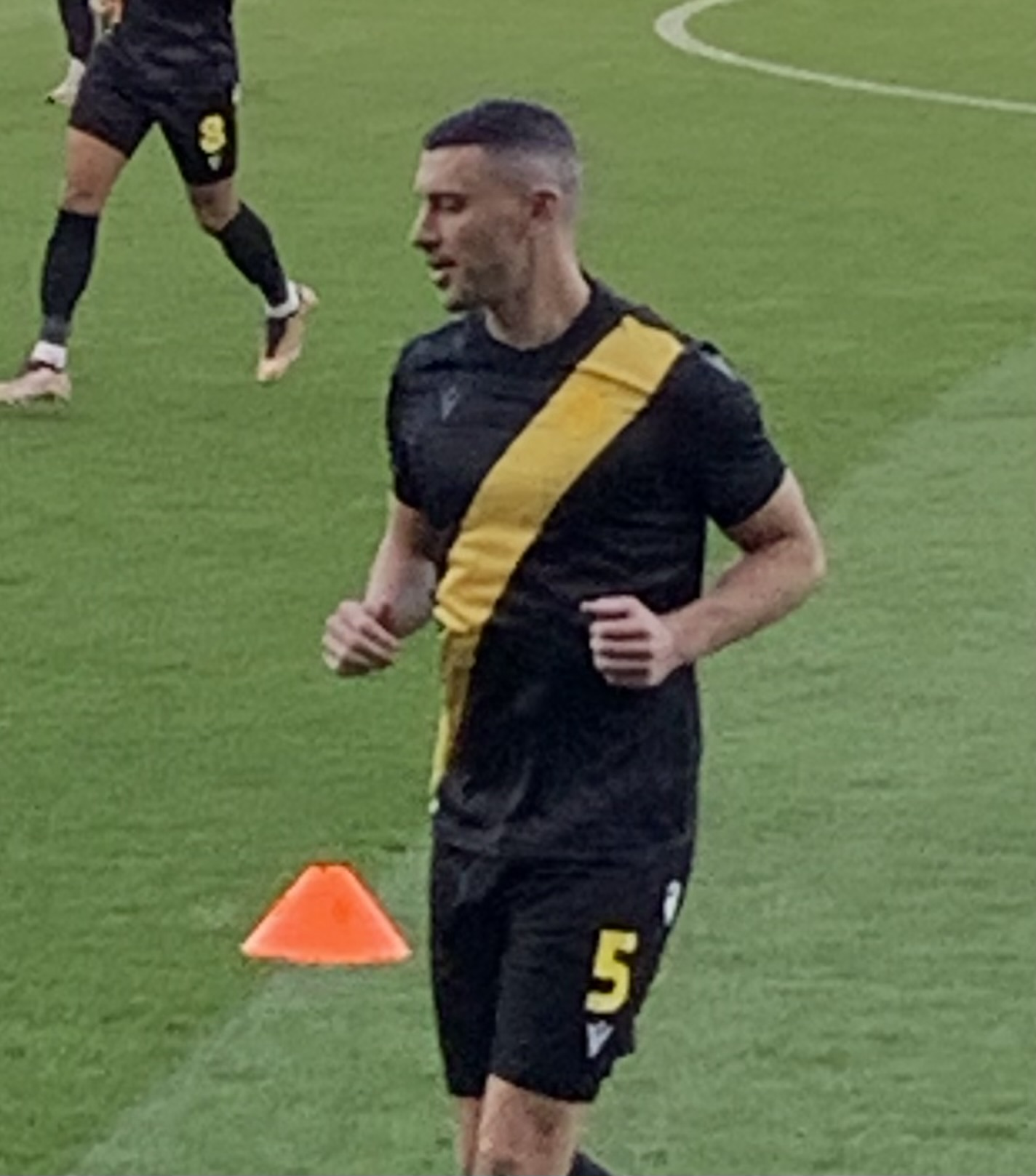
- Wilson at Bristol Rovers in 2023

Personal information
- Full name: James Steven Wilson
- Date of birth: 26 February 1989 (age 37)
- Place of birth: Newport, Wales
- Height: 6 ft 3 in (1.91 m)
- Position: Centre-back

Team information
- Current team: Cheltenham Town
- Number: 6

Youth career
- –2008: Bristol City

Senior career*
Years	Team	Apps	(Gls)
2008–2014	Bristol City	31	(0)
2008–2009	→ Brentford (loan)	14	(0)
2009–2010	→ Brentford (loan)	13	(0)
2013–2014	→ Cheltenham Town (loan)	4	(0)
2014–2016	Oldham Athletic	100	(2)
2016–2018	Sheffield United	7	(1)
2017–2018	→ Walsall (loan)	19	(1)
2018–2019	Lincoln City	19	(2)
2019–2021	Ipswich Town	40	(2)
2021–2023	Plymouth Argyle	83	(1)
2023–2025	Bristol Rovers	72	(2)
2025–	Cheltenham Town	53	(0)

International career
2006–2008	Wales U19	9	(0)
2009	Wales U21	3	(1)
2013	Wales	1	(0)
- * Club domestic league appearances and goals as of 14:54, 15 November 2026 (UTC)

James Steven Wilson (born 26 February 1989) is a Welsh professional footballer who plays as a defender for EFL League Two club Cheltenham Town. He has also represented Wales at international level. Primarily a centre-back, he can also play at right-back.

== Club career ==
=== Bristol City ===
Wilson began his career at Bristol City, graduating from the club's academy before going on to make his debut for the first-team in 2008. He scored on his debut for the club on 26 August 2008, in a 2–1 League Cup loss to Crewe Alexandra at Gresty Road. He was loaned out to Brentford for the first three months of the 2008–09 season, where he put in a number of impressive performances in a central defensive partnership with Reading loanee Alan Bennett. He made 16 appearances for the club during his loan spell. Despite returning to Ashton Gate by November, Wilson was able to claim a Football League Two winners medal.

He rejoined Brentford in an initial one-month loan deal on 20 August 2009, the loan deal later extended to 1 January 2010. Wilson was dismissed for a professional foul on Gareth Ainsworth during an away match against Wycombe Wanderers on 24 November and gives away a penalty, although Wojciech Szczęsny saved the spot-kick, Brentford still lost 1–0 at the end. He made 14 appearances during his second loan spell at Griffin Park.

He saw his first team involvement at Bristol City increase during the 2011–12 season, making 23 appearances in all competitions.

On 13 September 2013, Wilson joined Cheltenham Town on an initial one-month loan, making his debut for the club on 14 September 2013 in a 2–2 draw with Oxford United. He made 4 appearances before returning from his loan spell at the club.

=== Oldham Athletic ===
On 31 January 2014, Wilson signed for Oldham Athletic until the end of the 2013–14 season with a view to extending deal. He scored his first goal for the club on 29 April 2014, in a 1–1 draw with Sheffield United. He made 16 appearances during his first season at Oldham.

The one-year option that the club had on Wilson's contract was exercised, extending his contract till the end of the 2014–15 season. He became a first-team regular during the 2014–15 season, making 46 appearances in all competitions, scoring once.

He continued to be a regular in the first-team at Boundary Park during the 2015–16 season. He made 47 appearances in all competitions over the course of the season.

=== Sheffield United ===
On 5 July 2016, Wilson signed for Sheffield United on a two-year contract, after rejecting a new deal with Oldham. He scored his first goal for the club in a 2–1 win over Oxford United at Bramall Lane on 27 August 2016. He made 10 appearances during the 2016–17 season, as Sheffield United won the League One title and promotion to the Championship.

On 17 July 2017, Wilson joined League One club Walsall on loan until the end of the season. He made 20 appearances during his time at the club, scoring once.

=== Lincoln City ===
On 12 January 2018, Wilson signed for Lincoln City on a two-and-a-half-year deal, after leaving Sheffield United by mutual consent. Wilson was cup-tied for Lincoln's win in the 2018 EFL Trophy Final. He made 10 appearances during his first season at Sincil Bank.

After suffering a broken ankle during a match against Cambridge United, Wilson found his first team opportunities limited during the 2018–19 season. He made 16 appearances as Lincoln won the League Two title. His contract was terminated by mutual consent at the end of the season.

=== Ipswich Town ===
On 2 August 2019, Wilson signed a short-term contract with Ipswich Town until 1 January 2020. The next day, he made his debut for the club in a 1–0 away win against Burton Albion. After making 8 appearances for the club and impressing, Wilson signed a 18-month extension in October 2019, keeping him at the club until 2021. He made 31 appearances during his first season at Ipswich.

Wilson featured regularly during the early part of the 2020–21 season, before picking up a knee injury in October. He returned to the first-team squad on 20 February, starting in a 0–0 draw with Oxford United. Wilson scored his first goal for Ipswich in a 2–1 away win over Accrington Stanley on 2 March 2021, and his second against his former club Lincoln the following week. Wilson's impressive performances when he was fit to play during the season earned him Ipswich's Player of the Year award for the 2020–21 season. Despite this, on 10 May 2021, Ipswich announced that Wilson would be released following the end of his contract after being informed by new manager Paul Cook that he was not in his plans for the following season.

=== Plymouth Argyle ===
On 20 May 2021, Wilson was announced to be joining Plymouth Argyle on a free transfer following his release from Ipswich.

He made 41 appearances across the course of the 2022–23 season as Argyle were promoted to the Championship as Champions. Following the conclusion of the season, he was offered a new contract by the club. On 13 June 2023, it was revealed that he would be departing the club with the deadline for a decision on the offer having expired.

=== Bristol Rovers ===
On 23 June 2023, Wilson returned to League One with Bristol Rovers, signing a two-year deal. Following the completion of his signing, a late unsuccessful attempt from Wycombe Wanderers to secure his signature was revealed. His early time at the club was marred by injury, making just five appearances in all competitions before a knee injury picked up during training in late September ruled him out for an estimated period of six weeks. Having returned to first-team action, he established himself as a starter for the club, scoring his first goal in December 2023 in an FA Cup Second round victory over Crewe Alexandra. Following a calf injury picked up in a 2–1 victory over Charlton Athletic in December 2023, manager Matt Taylor revealed that he would be unavailable for months as opposed to weeks.

Having played every minute of the 2024–25 season, Wilson had a one-year contract extension triggered despite the club's relegation. On 25 June 2025 however, he had his contract terminated by mutual consent.

=== Cheltenham Town ===
On 28 July 2025, Wilson signed a one-year contract with League Two club Cheltenham Town.

On 5 May 2026, Cheltenham Town triggered Wilson's contract extension for the 2026–27 season after he met appearance-related clauses during the 2025–26 season.

== International career ==
Wilson is a former Wales under-21 international, and captained Wales at under-19 level.

He received his first call-up to the senior Wales squad in October 2012. He made his senior international debut for his country on 15 October 2013, in 1–1 draw against Belgium.

== Career statistics ==
=== Club ===
As of match played 14 November 2026

Appearances and goals by club, season and competition
Club	Season	League			FA Cup		League Cup		Other		Total	
Club	Season	Division	Apps	Goal	Apps	Goal	Apps	Goal	Apps	Goal	Apps	Goal
Bristol City	2008–09	Championship	2	0	0	0	1	1	—		3	1
Bristol City	2009–10	Championship	0	0	0	0	0	0	—		0	0
Bristol City	2010–11	Championship	2	0	0	0	0	0	—		2	0
Bristol City	2011–12	Championship	21	0	1	0	1	0	—		23	0
Bristol City	2012–13	Championship	6	0	1	0	0	0	—		7	0
Bristol City	Total		31	0	2	0	2	1	0	0	35	1
Brentford (loan)	2008–09	League Two	14	0	0	0	1	0	1 (Note: Appearance(s) in Football League Trophy)	0	16	0
Brentford (loan)	2009–10	League One	13	0	1	0	0	0	0	0	14	0
Cheltenham Town (loan)	2013–14	League Two	4	0	0	0	0	0	0	0	4	0
Oldham Athletic	2013–14	League One	16	1	0	0	0	0	0	0	16	1
Oldham Athletic	2014–15	League One	41	1	1	0	1	0	3	0	46	1
Oldham Athletic	2015–16	League One	43	0	2	0	1	0	1	0	47	0
Oldham Athletic	Total		100	2	3	0	2	0	4	0	109	2
Sheffield United	2016–17	League One	7	1	0	0	1	0	2 (Note: Appearance(s) in EFL Trophy)	0	10	1
Sheffield United	2017–18	Championship	0	0	0	0	0	0	—		0	0
Sheffield United	Total		7	1	0	0	1	0	2	0	10	1
Walsall (loan)	2017–18	League One	19	1	0	0	0	0	1	0	20	1
Lincoln City	2017–18	League Two	8	1	0	0	0	0	2 (Note: Appearances in EFL League Two play-offs)	0	10	1
Lincoln City	2018–19	League Two	11	1	1	0	2	0	2	0	16	1
Lincoln City	Total		19	2	1	0	2	0	4	0	26	2
Ipswich Town	2019–20	League One	23	0	3	0	1	0	4	0	31	0
Ipswich Town	2020–21	League One	17	2	0	0	1	0	0	0	18	2
Ipswich Town	Total		40	2	3	0	2	0	4	0	49	2
Plymouth Argyle	2021–22	League One	42	0	4	0	1	0	2	0	49	0
Plymouth Argyle	2022–23	League One	41	1	1	0	1	0	3	0	46	1
Plymouth Argyle	Total		83	1	5	0	2	0	5	0	95	1
Bristol Rovers	2023–24	League One	26	0	2	1	0	0	3	0	31	1
Bristol Rovers	2024–25	League One	46	2	2	0	0	0	1	0	49	2
Bristol Rovers	Total		72	2	4	1	0	0	4	0	80	3
Cheltenham Town	2025–26	League Two	42	0	3	0	1	1	0	0	46	1
Cheltenham Town	2026–27	League Two	11	0	1	0	0	0	2	0	14	0
Cheltenham Town	Total		53	0	4	0	1	1	2	0	60	1
Career total			455	11	23	1	13	2	27	0	518	14

=== International ===
As of match played 15 October 2013

Appearances and goals by national team and year
National team	Year	Apps	Goals
Wales	2013	1	0
Total		1	0

== Honours ==
Brentford

- Football League Two: 2008–09

Sheffield United

- EFL League One: 2016–17

Lincoln City

- EFL League Two: 2018–19
- EFL Trophy: 2017–18

Plymouth Argyle

- EFL League One: 2022–23
- EFL Trophy runner-up: 2022–23

Individual

- Ipswich Town Player of the Year: 2020–21
