= Lino Sousa =

English footballer (born 2005)

Personal information
- Full name: Lino Gonçalo da Cruz Sousa
- Date of birth: 19 January 2005 (age 21)
- Place of birth: Lisbon, Portugal
- Height: 1.85 m (6 ft 1 in)
- Position: Left-back

Team information
- Current team: Shrewsbury Town (on loan from Aston Villa)
- Number: 25

Youth career
- 2016–2022: West Bromwich Albion
- 2022−2024: Arsenal

Senior career*
Years	Team	Apps	(Gls)
2024–	Aston Villa	0	(0)
2024	→ Plymouth Argyle (loan)	8	(0)
2024–2025	→ Bristol Rovers (loan)	25	(0)
2026	→ Rotherham United (loan)	5	(0)
2026–	→ Shrewsbury Town (loan)	2	(0)

International career^{‡}
2019−2020	England U15	2	(0)
2021	England U16	2	(0)
2022	England U17	2	(0)
2022−2023	England U18	8	(0)
2023−2024	England U19	10	(0)
- * Club domestic league appearances and goals as of 12:12, 21 September 2026 (UTC) ‡ National team caps and goals as of 10:30, 6 February 2026 (UTC)

Lino Gonçalo da Cruz Sousa (born 19 January 2005) is a professional footballer who plays as a left-back for EFL League Two club Shrewsbury Town, on loan from Premier League club Aston Villa. Born in Portugal, he is a youth international for England.

== Early life ==
Born in Portugal, when Sousa was eight-years-old he moved with his family from Lisbon to Wolverhampton. Sousa played for Aspire FC before joining the academy at West Bromwich Albion. He attended Sandwell Academy from ages 11–16.

== Career ==
=== Early career ===
Lino Sousa played regularly for the West Bromwich Albion team that reached the semi-finals of the 2021 FA Youth Cup despite only being 16-years-old himself at the time.

=== Arsenal ===
Sousa joined Arsenal from West Brom in January 2022. There was discussions at Arsenal in the summer of 2022 to fast-track Lino Sousa into first team training. Sousa's quick development was reported to be part of the reason Arsenal allowed Joel Lopez's return to his native Spain in the summer of 2022, despite Lopez being a regular for the under-23 side and contributing two goals and five assists from left back.

Sousa was taken on the first team pre-season training camp to Germany in the summer of 2022. In September 2022, he was confirmed as being included in the Arsenal first team training and their travelling party as they prepared for the away UEFA Europa League match against FC Zurich. He made his first Premier League match day squad on 18 September 2022 against Brentford and was then named among the match-day substitutes for Arsenal.

=== Aston Villa ===
On 1 February 2024, Sousa signed for Premier League club Aston Villa for an undisclosed fee, immediately joining Championship side Plymouth Argyle on loan until the end of the season. On 3 February, Sousa made his Football League debut as a late substitute in a 1–0 victory over Swansea City.

On 14 August 2024, Sousa joined League One club Bristol Rovers on loan until the end of the 2024–25 season. Having initially struggled for game time over the first few months of the season, the appointment of Iñigo Calderón as new head coach in December 2024 saw Sousa break into the starting eleven on a more consistent basis.

On 2 February 2026, Sousa joined League One club Rotherham United on loan until the end of the season.

On 31 August 2026, Sousa joined League Two club Shrewsbury Town on a season-long loan.

== International career ==
Sousa has played for England at age group level but is also still eligible to represent Portugal, the country of his birth. In September 2022 he was called up to the England national under-18 football team for the first time.

On 22 March 2023, Sousa made his England U18 debut during a 2–1 win over Croatia in Medulin. On 10 April 2023, Sousa was called up for Portugal U18 team.

On 6 September 2023, Sousa made his England U19 debut during a 1–0 defeat to Germany in Oliva.

== Career statistics ==
As of match played 6 October 2026

Appearances and goals by club, season, and competition
Club	Season	League			National cup		League cup		Europe		Other		Total	
Club	Season	Division	Apps	Goals	Apps	Goals	Apps	Goals	Apps	Goals	Apps	Goals	Apps	Goals
Arsenal	2022–23	Premier League	0	0	0	0	0	0	0	0	3 (Note: Appearances in EFL Trophy)	0	3	0
Arsenal	2023–24	Premier League	0	0	0	0	0	0	0	0	2	1	2	1
Arsenal	Total		0	0	0	0	0	0	0	0	5	1	5	1
Aston Villa	2023–24	Premier League	0	0	0	0	—		0	0	0	0	0	0
Aston Villa	2024–25	Premier League	0	0	0	0	0	0	0	0	0	0	0	0
Aston Villa	2025–26	Premier League	0	0	0	0	0	0	0	0	0	0	0	0
Aston Villa	2026–27	Premier League	0	0	0	0	0	0	0	0	1	0	0	0
Aston Villa	Total		0	0	0	0	0	0	0	0	1	0	1	0
Plymouth Argyle (loan)	2023–24	Championship	8	0	0	0	—		—		0	0	8	0
Bristol Rovers (loan)	2024–25	League One	25	0	1	0	0	0	—		3	0	29	0
Rotherham United (loan)	2025–26	League One	5	0	—		—		—		0	0	5	0
Shrewsbury Town (loan)	2026–27	League Two	2	0	0	0	—		—		2	0	4	0
Career total			40	0	1	0	0	0	0	0	11	1	52	1

== Honours ==
Arsenal U21

- FA Youth Cup runner-up: 2022–23
