= Max Edwards-Stryjewski =

Welsh footballer

Personal information
- Date of birth: 19 September 2005 (age 21)
- Place of birth: Wales
- Height: 6 ft 2 in (1.88 m)
- Position: Midfielder

Team information
- Current team: Bristol Rovers
- Number: 41

Youth career
- Bristol Rovers

Senior career*
Years	Team	Apps	(Gls)
2022–	Bristol Rovers	0	(0)
2025	→ Cribbs (loan)	9	(0)

International career
2021	Wales U17	2	(0)
2023–	Wales U19	1	(0)
- * Club domestic league appearances and goals as of 16:19, 30 April 2025 (UTC)

Max Edwards-Stryjewski is a Welsh footballer who plays as a midfielder for EFL League Two club Bristol Rovers.

== Career ==
Max Edwards-Stryjewski was named in the Bristol Rovers matchday squad for the first time on 8 January 2022, coming on as a 93rd minute substitute in a 2–1 FA Cup third round defeat to Peterborough United. At the time of him coming on, he was Rovers' second youngest debutant ever and their youngest in the cup, a record broken by Ollie Dewsbury in November 2023.

In February 2025, Edwards-Stryjewski joined Southern League Division One South side Cribbs on loan.

== International career ==
In August 2019, Edwards-Stryjewski was named in the Wales U15 squad in the 2019 UEFA tournament against Cyprus, Northern Ireland and Malta.

In August 2021, Edwards-Stryjewski was announced to be in the Wales U17 squad for the upcoming friendly fixtures against Scotland U17s, featuring in the second fixture, a 4–3 victory.

In November 2021, Edwards-Stryjewski was named in the Wales U17 national squad for the upcoming UEFA Euro Qualifiers held in Portugal.
