= Roger Lewis (biographer) =

Welsh academic and biographer

Roger Lewis FRSL
- Born: 26 February 1960 (age 66); Caerphilly, Wales
- Education: Bassaleg School, Newport
- Alma mater: University of St Andrews (MA); Magdalen College, Oxford (MA)
- Occupations: Academic, biographer, journalist

Roger Lewis (born 26 February 1960) is a Welsh academic, biographer and journalist. He is best known for his biographies, The Life and Death of Peter Sellers, and Erotic Vagrancy, about Richard Burton and Elizabeth Taylor.

In 2026, Lewis was elected a Fellow of the Royal Society of Literature.

== Biography ==
Lewis was born in Caerphilly, Glamorgan, in 1960. He was raised in Bedwas, Monmouthshire, and was educated at Bassaleg School in Newport. He then attended the University of St Andrews, graduating MA, then Magdalen College, Oxford, where he gained the MLitt degree, both with first-class honours. He became a Fellow of Wolfson College, Oxford, in 1984.

Lewis has contributed literary journalism to the Daily Express, Daily Mail and Daily Telegraph. He has written biographies of Peter Sellers (1994), Charles Hawtrey (2001), Anthony Burgess (2003), and Laurence Olivier (2007). His book on Sellers was dramatized by HBO as The Life and Death of Peter Sellers, which won a Golden Globe Award and was nominated for the Palme d'Or at the 2004 Cannes Film Festival.

In the introduction to his Sellers biography, Lewis admits Norman Wisdom was his first "movie love". Wisdom was displaced in the young Lewis's affections one Saturday afternoon when he chanced upon a Peter Sellers double bill on television. Lewis was full of cold and had been left at home by his parents.

"Wrapped in my mother's Glenurquart tartan travelling rug, eating custard creams and drinking Ribena through a straw, I settled, in a bored sort of way, to watch a double bill on the only channel not killing time with sports commentaries."

The double bill—Two-Way Stretch followed by The Wrong Arm of the Law—was broadcast on BBC2 on Saturday, 26 May 1973. Lewis was aged 13 at the time. Seeing these films sparked a lifelong love of Sellers, in particular his work in The Goons.

Seasonal Suicide Notes (2009) chronicles five years of the author's life. It was followed up by a second volume of "dyspeptic musings", What am I Doing Here? My Years as Me, in 2012.

Erotic Vagrancy, his massive joint biography of Richard Burton and Elizabeth Taylor, took him 13 years to complete, and was published to generally positive reviews in October 2023. In a talk to The Oldie Literary Lunch in January 2024, Lewis said he pitched the book to his publisher as "Roland Barthes meets The Wolf Man".

In the book's author details it was revealed Erotic Vagrancy is being turned into an ITV drama series.

In the endpapers of Seasonal Suicide Notes (2009) Lewis listed 'forthcoming' books. These include:

- The Kill Fees Trilogy, comprising Growing Up With Comedians -- on clowns, Ratbags and Sleazeballs -- on women and men, and Get A Life! -- on the art and science of biography.
- Mister Jesus -- a gospel
- When I Was Young and Twenty and I Had a Dainty Quim -- madrigals.

Of these, only Growing Up With Comedians has since appeared in print, in 2010.

In December 2025, Lewis told Gyles Brandreth in the More Rosebud podcast that he writes all his books in long-hand, at the rate of a thousand words a day. The following day, he polishes and types it up.

Lewis was elected a Fellow of the Royal Society of Literature (FRSL) in 2026.

== Reinvention of the biography form ==
Lewis has claimed that he tries to find a unique structure, voice and tone suited to the subject of each of his biographies. This often results in his adoption of an idiosyncratic biographer's persona, which can sometimes be misunderstood by readers who are looking for a more conventional cradle-to-grave approach. This was most clearly apparent in the reaction to his experimental biography of author Anthony Burgess. Following its publication, the subheading on a review by Blake Morrison described him as being "appalled by Roger Lewis's 20-year quest to destroy Anthony Burgess". In defence, Lewis told Stephen Moss: "What I was trying to do with all my biographies was find a form that would suit the subject matter...Anthony Burgess was a great charlatan, so the book is full of all these mock-scholarly footnotes. I thought I'd pulled it off, and then the reviews came out and they were homicidal".

Lewis told Brandreth in 2025 that in the course of writing his biographies, he has ceased to believe that it is possible to arrive at an objective portrait of a subject. Facts do not speak for themselves, he said, rather, as a biographer one is only able to achieve an effect akin to the Cubist style of painting whereby the varied and multi-perspective memories of the biographer's interviewees coalesce to create a kaleidoscopic biographical portrait.

In the same interview, he also described how his feelings towards Sellers have mellowed in the 30-odd years since he wrote his gargantuan biography of the legendary comic. In his 30s when he was writing the book, Lewis abhorred the monster he perceived Sellers to be. Today, in his mid-sixties, Lewis believes the strain of having to live as Peter Sellers must have been hard to bear.

Journalist Tanya Gold credits Lewis with reinventing the biography as a form and genre, during a discussion about Erotic Vagrancy at the Jewish Literary Foundation in March 2024.

== Other controversies ==
Writing a book review for the Daily Mail in August 2011, Lewis expressed a dislike of the Welsh language, calling it an "appalling and moribund monkey language". Plaid Cymru politician Jonathan Edwards reported Lewis's comments to the police and to the Press Complaints Commission.

In 2014, comments about lesbians Lewis made in a Spectator article led to publishers Biteback Publishing withdrawing an offer of a book deal.

== Personal life ==
Lewis is married – to Anna, an educational psychologist – with three sons, and lives in Hastings, with a holiday apartment in Bad Ischl, Austria. He is a lover of good art and bullfighting. In 2023, he suffered a heart attack in the car park at Morrisons supermarket in Hastings and had to be airlifted to hospital.

== Books ==
- Erotic Vagrancy: Everything about Richard Burton and Elizabeth Taylor. London: Quercus. 2023. ISBN 978-0-857-38172-9.
- What Am I Still Doing Here? My Life as Me. London: Coronet. 2011. ISBN 978-1-444-70868-4.
- Growing Up with Comedians. London: Century. 2010. ISBN 978-1-84413-808-1.
- Seasonal Suicide Notes: My Life as it is Lived. London: Short Books. 2009. ISBN 978-1-907595-00-4.
- The Real Life of Laurence Olivier. London: Arrow Books. 2007. ISBN 978-0-09-951366-7.
- Anthony Burgess. London: Faber and Faber. 2003. ISBN 978-0-571-21721-2.
- Charles Hawtrey 1914–1988: The Man Who Was Private Widdle. London: Faber and Faber. 2002. ISBN 978-0-571-21089-3.
- The Life and Death of Peter Sellers. London: Century. 1994.
