= Micah Anthony =

English footballer (born 2004)

Personal information
- Full name: Micah Oluwapelumi Oluwatumise Ayomide Anthony
- Date of birth: 26 March 2004 (age 22)
- Place of birth: Camden, England
- Position: Winger

Team information
- Current team: Farnborough
- Number: 11

Youth career
- Tottenham Hotspur
- 2012–2024: Queens Park Rangers

Senior career*
Years	Team	Apps	(Gls)
2023–2024	Queens Park Rangers	0	(0)
2023	→ Hanwell Town (loan)	8	(0)
2024–2026	Bristol Rovers	0	(0)
2024–2025	→ Bath City (loan)	9	(0)
2025	→ Kettering Town (loan)	1	(0)
2026–	Farnborough	7	(2)
- * Club domestic league appearances and goals as of 21:15, 11 May 2026 (UTC)

Micah Oluwapelumi Oluwatumise Ayomide Anthony (born 26 March 2004) is an English professional footballer who plays as a winger for National League South side Farnborough.

== Career ==
=== Queens Park Rangers ===
Anthony began his football career with Total Football Academy, joining Tottenham Hotspur aged seven following an unsuccessful trial with Crystal Palace. One year later, he joined Queens Park Rangers.

In July 2020, Anthony signed a two-year scholarship with Queens Park Rangers. Having spent a short time on loan with Southern Premier Division South side Hanwell Town, toward the end of the 2022–23 season, he signed a new six-month contract upon his return to his parent club.

Following the conclusion of the 2023–24 season, Anthony was released by Queens Park Rangers.

=== Bristol Rovers ===
In July 2024, Anthony was reported to be on trial with League One club Bristol Rovers, first featuring off of the bench in a friendly against Yeovil Town. On 9 August 2024, he was announced to have joined the club on a two-year deal with the option for a further twelve months having impressed new manager Matt Taylor with his willingness to defend for the team as well as his exciting attacking play. On 13 August 2024, he made his senior debut, coming on a second-half substitute in a 2–0 EFL Cup First Round defeat to Cardiff City.

On 5 November 2024, Anthony joined National League South side Bath City on a one-month loan deal. In January 2025, it was announced that Anthony had suffered a tear to his medial knee ligament.

On 19 September 2025, Anthony joined Southern League Premier Division Central club Kettering Town on a short-term loan.

On 4 February 2026, Anthony departed Bristol Rovers.

=== Farnborough ===
On 28 February 2026, following his departure from Bristol Rovers, Anthony joined National League South side, Farnborough.

== Personal life ==
Anthony's twin brother Elijah also played for the Queens Park Rangers academy.

== Career statistics ==
As of match played 25 April 2026

Appearances and goals by club, season and competition
Club	Season	League			FA Cup		League Cup		Other		Total	
Club	Season	Division	Apps	Goals	Apps	Goals	Apps	Goals	Apps	Goals	Apps	Goals
Queens Park Rangers	2022–23	Championship	0	0	0	0	0	0	—		0	0
Hanwell Town (loan)	2022–23	Southern League Premier Division South	8	0	—		—		1 (Note: Appearance(s) in Middlesex Senior Cup)	0	9	0
Bristol Rovers	2024–25	League One	0	0	0	0	1	0	2 (Note: Appearance(s) in EFL Trophy)	0	3	0
Bristol Rovers	2025–26	League Two	0	0	0	0	0	0	0	0	0	0
Bristol Rovers	Total		0	0	0	0	1	0	2	0	3	0
Bath City (loan)	2024–25	National League South	9	0	—		—		2 (Note: One appearance in FA Trophy, one appearance in Somerset Premier Cup)	0	11	0
Kettering Town (loan)	2025–26	Southern League Premier Division Central	1	0	0	0	—		1 (Note: Appearance(s) in FA Trophy)	0	2	0
Farnborough	2025–26	National League South	7	2	—		—		—		7	2
Career total			25	2	0	0	1	0	6	0	32	2
