= Kofi Shaw =

English footballer

Personal information
- Full name: Kofi Ashton Shaw
- Date of birth: 4 December 2006 (age 19)
- Place of birth: Gloucester, England
- Position: Midfielder

Team information
- Current team: Brighton & Hove Albion
- Number: 45

Youth career
- West Bromwich Albion
- –2023: Bristol Rovers
- 2025–: Brighton & Hove Albion

Senior career*
Years	Team	Apps	(Gls)
2023–2025	Bristol Rovers	16	(0)
2024–2025	→ Yeovil Town (loan)	16	(2)
2025–	Brighton & Hove Albion	0	(0)
- * Club domestic league appearances and goals as of 20:04, 1 August 2025 (UTC)

Kofi Ashton Shaw (born 4 December 2006) is an English footballer who plays as a midfielder for the academy of Brighton & Hove Albion.

== Career ==
=== Bristol Rovers ===
Born in Gloucester, Shaw joined the West Bromwich Albion academy at the under-7s age group before being released eight years later. Following his release, he joined Bristol Rovers, reportedly drawing interest from Premier League clubs in December 2022 following an impressive FA Youth Cup performance against Leyton Orient.

At the 2023–24 end of season awards, Shaw was named as Rovers' Under-18s Player of the Season. The following week, he was rewarded with a first senior appearance, replacing Luke Thomas in a final-day 2–0 defeat to Wigan Athletic.

Having remained in the first-team picture over pre-season, Shaw made his first appearance of the 2024–25 season in an EFL Cup First Round defeat to Cardiff City, replacing Promise Omochere in the second-half. The following week, on his first senior start, he scored a first senior goal in a 3–3 EFL Trophy Group Stage draw with Tottenham Hotspur U21, his performance improving manager Matt Taylor. In September 2024, he once again was reported to be of interest to Premier League sides with Aston Villa and Southampton reportedly monitoring his development alongside Leeds United.

On 21 October 2024, Shaw signed a new contract until June 2027, before joining National League side Yeovil Town on loan until January 2025. On 21 December 2024, he scored a first goal for the club with the equaliser in an eventual 2–1 defeat to Hartlepool United. Aged 18 years and 17 days, he become the club's second youngest ever goalscorer. On 10 January 2025, his loan was extended for the remainder of the season. On 18 February 2025, he was recalled from his loan.

Following his recall, new manager Iñigo Calderón revealed that he was a big fan of Shaw and promised he would "have his minutes". Following a run of starts in the first-team, he became a key member of the first-team squad in the eyes of the management team, once again being linked with clubs in the Premier League. Despite the club's continuing struggles on the pitch, Shaw himself was nominated for the 2025 League One Apprentice of the Season, losing out to Jake Richards of Exeter City. Following relegation, he was named as the club's Young Player of the Year.

=== Brighton & Hove Albion ===
On 1 August 2025, Shaw signed for Premier League club Brighton & Hove Albion for an undisclosed fee, initially joining the under-21 side.

== Personal life ==
Born in England, Shaw is of Ghanaian descent.

== Career statistics ==
As of match played 3 November 2026

Appearances and goals by club, season and competition
Club	Season	League			FA Cup		League Cup		Other		Total	
Club	Season	Division	Apps	Goals	Apps	Goals	Apps	Goals	Apps	Goals	Apps	Goals
Bristol Rovers	2023–24	League One	1	0	0	0	0	0	0	0	1	0
Bristol Rovers	2024–25	League One	15	0	0	0	1	0	2 (Note: Appearance(s) in EFL Trophy)	1	18	1
Bristol Rovers	Total		16	0	0	0	1	0	2	1	19	1
Yeovil Town (loan)	2024–25	National League	16	2	0	0	—		1 (Note: Appearance in FA Trophy)	0	17	2
Brighton & Hove Albion U21s	2025–26	—							1	0	1	0
Brighton & Hove Albion U21s	2026–27	—							3	0	3	0
Brighton & Hove Albion U21s	Total		—						4	0	4	0
Career total			32	2	0	0	1	0	7	1	40	3

== Honours ==
Individual

- Bristol Rovers Young Player of the Year: 2024–25
