= Luke McCormick (footballer, born 1999) =

English footballer

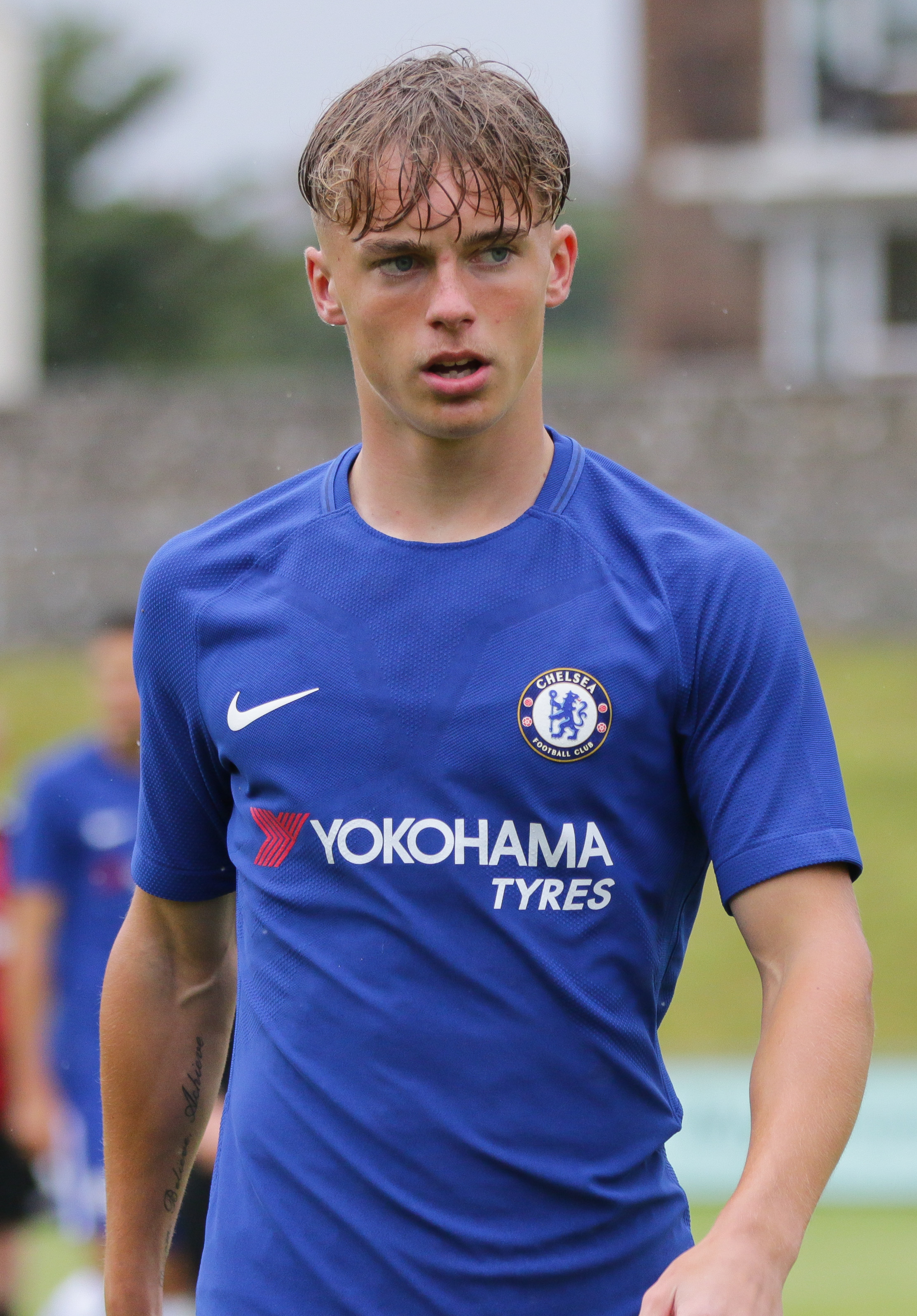
- McCormick with Chelsea in 2017

Personal information
- Full name: Luke Philip McCormick
- Date of birth: 21 January 1999 (age 27)
- Place of birth: Bury St Edmunds, England
- Height: 1.80 m (5 ft 11 in)
- Position: Midfielder

Team information
- Current team: AFC Fylde (on loan from Yeovil Town)

Youth career
- 2005–2019: Chelsea

Senior career*
| Years | Team | Apps | (Gls) |
| 2019–2021 | Chelsea | 0 | (0) |
| 2019–2020 | → Shrewsbury Town (loan) | 5 | (0) |
| 2020–2021 | → Bristol Rovers (loan) | 39 | (6) |
| 2021–2022 | AFC Wimbledon | 40 | (7) |
| 2022–2025 | Bristol Rovers | 57 | (4) |
| 2025 | → Forest Green Rovers (loan) | 5 | (0) |
| 2025– | Yeovil Town | 40 | (14) |
| 2026– | → AFC Fylde (loan) | 4 | (3) |
- * Club domestic league appearances and goals as of 18:13, 14 November 2026 (UTC)

Luke Philip McCormick (born 21 January 1999) is an English professional footballer who plays as a midfielder for AFC Fylde on loan from National League club Yeovil Town.

== Career ==
=== Chelsea ===
McCormick joined Chelsea at the age of six.

==== Shrewsbury Town (loan) ====
On 18 July 2019, McCormick signed a new three-year deal, which would keep him at the club until 2022. On the same day, he joined League One side Shrewsbury Town on a season-long loan. He was recommended to manager Sam Ricketts by former Chelsea player and current coach Joe Cole. On 3 August, he made his professional debut for "The Shrews" in a 1–0 home win over Portsmouth, during which he was substituted off for Josh Laurent after 53 minutes.

His loan spell came to an end on 2 January 2020.

==== Bristol Rovers (loan) ====
On 21 September 2020, McCormick joined Bristol Rovers on loan until the end of the season. On 26 September, he made his league debut as a starter against Doncaster Rovers, which ended in a 4–1 away loss. On 12 December 2020, he scored his first goal for the club, finishing from inside the box to score the second in a 3–0 victory over rivals Plymouth Argyle. On 19 January 2021, McCormick scored an impressive free kick to level the scores as Rovers came from 2–0 down to get back to 2–2 against Crewe Alexandra in a match they eventually lost 3–2, the goal being nominated for the league's January Goal of the Month award on 19 February, winning the award a week later by public vote. On 5 April 2021, with Rovers deep in a relegation battle, McCormick scored a double as the Gas beat Doncaster Rovers, a result that saw Rovers end a five-match losing streak and keep their survival hopes alive, a performance which saw McCormick rated a perfect 10/10 by the Bristol Post. At the end of the season, he re-joined Chelsea when his loan spell was up.

=== AFC Wimbledon ===
On 2 July 2021, McCormick returned to League One, this time on a permanent basis, as he left the club he had played for since the age of six to sign for AFC Wimbledon. He scored on his debut for Wimbledon in a 2-1 win at Doncaster Rovers on 7 August 2021. Going into the final day of the season, AFC Wimbledon were three points from safety with a seven-goal swing required in order to survive relegation. A 4–3 home defeat to Accrington Stanley in their last match saw Wimbledon relegated to League Two, a second consecutive third-tier relegation for McCormick.

=== Bristol Rovers ===
After weeks of speculation that had seen McCormick left out of the matchday squads for AFC Wimbledon, McCormick returned to Bristol Rovers for an undisclosed fee on 24 August 2022, signing a three-year deal. He made his second debut for the club on 30 August from the bench in an EFL Trophy tie with Plymouth Argyle, scoring in the shootout defeat following a 1–1 draw. On 18 October 2022, McCormick scored his first goal since his return to the club in a 3–0 EFL Trophy victory over Swindon Town. On 11 March 2023, having been booked and given away a penalty, he was substituted off in a 3–1 victory over Forest Green Rovers having he himself only being brought on nine minutes previously. After the match he came into criticism from his manager, being told he needed to get his act together with a warning relating to his future at the club.

On 15 August 2023, McCormick scored his first league goal since his return to the club, a 98th minute winner away at Charlton Athletic. In October 2023, having established his place in the first-team, an injury sustained in training ruled him out for a period of six-to-ten weeks. He returned to first-team action on 6 January 2024, coming off of the bench in an FA Cup Third Round draw with Norwich City.

On 17 January 2025, McCormick joined National League leaders Forest Green Rovers on loan for the remainder of the season.

McCormick was released by Bristol Rovers at the end of the 2024–25 season.

=== Yeovil Town ===
On 4 August 2025, McCormick joined National League club Yeovil Town on a one-year deal. After a successful first-half of the 2025–26 season, scoring eight goals in 25 league appearances, McCormick agreed a new two-year contract with Yeovil Town until the end of 2027–28 season.

On 3 August 2026, McCormick was named club captain for the 2026–27 season. In September 2026, manager Billy Rowley revealed that McCormick had been made unavailable for selection due to an "internal matter", later revealing that there had been a dispute between the two and that it was unlikely that McCormick would feature for the club.

On 15 October 2026, McCormick joined fellow National League side AFC Fylde on a three-month loan deal.

== Career statistics ==
As of match played 14 November 2026

Appearances and goals by club, season and competition
| Club | Season | League | | | FA Cup | | EFL Cup | | Other | | Total | |
| Club | Season | Division | Apps | Goals | Apps | Goals | Apps | Goals | Apps | Goals | Apps | Goals |
|---|---|---|---|---|---|---|---|---|---|---|---|---|
| Chelsea U23 | 2017–18 | — | | | — | | — | | 3 (Note: Appearance(s) in EFL Trophy) | 1 | 3 | 1 |
| Chelsea U23 | 2018–19 | — | | | — | | — | | 2 | 0 | 2 | 0 |
| Chelsea U23 | 2019–20 | — | | | — | | — | | 0 | 0 | 0 | 0 |
| Chelsea U23 | 2020–21 | — | | | — | | — | | 1 | 0 | 1 | 0 |
| Chelsea U23 | Chelsea Total | | | | — | | — | | 6 | 1 | 6 | 1 |
| Shrewsbury Town (loan) | 2019–20 | League One | 5 | 0 | 0 | 0 | 1 | 0 | 2 | 0 | 8 | 0 |
| Bristol Rovers (loan) | 2020–21 | League One | 39 | 6 | 3 | 0 | 0 | 0 | 0 | 0 | 42 | 6 |
| AFC Wimbledon | 2021–22 | League One | 40 | 7 | 3 | 0 | 2 | 0 | 2 | 1 | 47 | 8 |
| Bristol Rovers | 2022–23 | League One | 22 | 0 | 2 | 0 | 0 | 0 | 6 | 1 | 30 | 1 |
| Bristol Rovers | 2023–24 | League One | 16 | 2 | 2 | 1 | 1 | 0 | 2 | 0 | 21 | 3 |
| Bristol Rovers | 2024–25 | League One | 19 | 2 | 2 | 0 | 1 | 0 | 3 | 1 | 25 | 3 |
| Bristol Rovers | Bristol Rovers total | | 96 | 10 | 9 | 1 | 2 | 0 | 11 | 2 | 118 | 13 |
| Forest Green Rovers (loan) | 2024–25 | National League | 5 | 0 | 0 | 0 | — | | 2 (Note: One appearance in FA Trophy, one appearance and one goal in National League Cup) | 1 | 7 | 1 |
| Yeovil Town | 2025–26 | National League | 32 | 8 | 1 | 0 | — | | 2 (Note: Appearances in FA Trophy) | 0 | 35 | 8 |
| Yeovil Town | 2026–27 | National League | 8 | 6 | 0 | 0 | — | | 0 | 0 | 8 | 6 |
| Yeovil Town | Yeovil Town total | | 40 | 14 | 1 | 0 | — | | 2 | 0 | 43 | 14 |
| AFC Fylde (loan) | 2026–27 | National League | 4 | 3 | 2 | 1 | — | | 0 | 0 | 6 | 4 |
| Career total | | | 190 | 34 | 15 | 2 | 5 | 0 | 25 | 5 | 235 | 41 |

== Honours ==
=== Individual ===
- League One Goal of the Month: January 2021
