= Bryant Bilongo =

English association football player

Personal information
- Full name: Bryant Akono Bilongo
- Date of birth: 15 September 2001 (age 25)
- Place of birth: Wandsworth, England
- Height: 1.90 m (6 ft 3 in)
- Position: Defender

Team information
- Current team: Rochdale
- Number: 27

Youth career
- AFC Wimbledon
- Hanworth Villa

Senior career*
Years	Team	Apps	(Gls)
2020–2021	Hanworth Villa	10	(0)
2021–2022	Kingstonian	20	(1)
2022–2024	Middlesbrough	0	(0)
2022	→ Woking (loan)	1	(0)
2024	→ Ebbsfleet United (loan)	12	(1)
2024–2026	Bristol Rovers	23	(1)
2025	→ Harrogate Town (loan)	16	(1)
2026–	Rochdale	0	(0)
- * Club domestic league appearances and goals as of 10:44, 16 January 2026 (UTC)

Bryant Akono Bilongo (born 15 September 2001) is an English professional footballer who plays as a defender for EFL League Two club Rochdale.

== Club career ==
Released by AFC Wimbledon at a young age, Bilongo went on to join Hanworth Villa youth side before eventually making the step up into the first-team during the 2020–21 campaign, in which he featured ten times.

Following his breakthrough season, Bilongo joined Isthmian League Premier Division side, Kingstonian in June 2021. Impressing early on, his form attracted the attention of both Football League and Premier League sides, including Chelsea who subsequently trialled the full-back in October 2021. Despite this, Bilongo agreed to join Middlesbrough three months later for an undisclosed fee. On 10 August 2022, he made his first-team debut for Middlesbrough, replacing Paddy McNair during an EFL Cup first round tie defeat against Barnsley, with half an hour remaining. On 29 October 2022, he joined National League side, Woking on a one-month loan. Bilongo went onto feature twice for the Cards before returning to Middlesbrough in November.

On 1 February 2024, Bilongo joined National League club Ebbsfleet United on loan until the end of the season.

=== Bristol Rovers ===
On 28 June 2024, Bilongo signed for League One side Bristol Rovers for an undisclosed fee, signing a two-year deal with the option for a further year. He made his debut for the club on the opening day of the season, scoring a 92nd minute winner as Rovers defeated Northampton Town to claim a first opening day victory in thirteen years. Following the match, he described it as the highlight of his career to date.

On 15 January 2025, Bilongo joined League Two club Harrogate Town on loan for the remainder of the season.

=== Rochdale ===
On 15 January 2026, Bilongo joined National League club Rochdale on an eighteen-month contract.

== Career statistics ==
As of 15 January 2026

Appearances and goals by club, season and competition
Club	Season	League			FA Cup		League Cup		Other		Total	
Club	Season	Division	Apps	Goals	Apps	Goals	Apps	Goals	Apps	Goals	Apps	Goals
Hanworth Villa	2020–21	Combined Counties League Premier Division	10	0	0	0	—		0	0	10	0
Kingstonian	2021–22	Isthmian League Premier Division	20	1	3	0	—		4 (Note: Appearances in the FA Trophy)	0	27	1
Middlesbrough	2021–22	Championship	0	0	—		—		—		0	0
Middlesbrough	2022–23	Championship	0	0	—		1	0	—		1	0
Middlesbrough	2023–24	Championship	0	0	0	0	0	0	—		0	0
Middlesbrough	Total		0	0	0	0	1	0	—		1	0
Woking (loan)	2022–23	National League	1	0	1	0	—		0	0	2	0
Ebbsfleet United (loan)	2023–24	National League	12	1	—		—		0	0	12	1
Bristol Rovers	2024–25	League One	14	1	1	0	1	0	2 (Note: Appearance(s) in EFL Trophy)	0	18	1
Bristol Rovers	2025–26	League Two	9	0	2	0	1	0	3	0	15	0
Bristol Rovers	Total		23	1	3	0	2	0	5	0	33	1
Harrogate Town (loan)	2024–25	League Two	16	1	0	0	0	0	0	0	16	1
Career total			82	4	7	0	3	0	9	0	101	4
