= Ollie Dewsbury =

Welsh footballer (born 2008)

Personal information
- Full name: Ollie Joseph Dewsbury
- Date of birth: 22 February 2008 (age 18)
- Place of birth: Newport, Wales
- Position: Forward

Team information
- Current team: Farnborough (on loan from Bristol Rovers)
- Number: 10

Youth career
- –2023: Bristol Rovers

Senior career*
Years	Team	Apps	(Gls)
2023–	Bristol Rovers	18	(0)
2024–2025	→ Yate Town (loan)	11	(4)
2025	→ Taunton Town (loan)	5	(1)
2026	→ Weston-super-Mare (loan)	18	(3)
2026–	→ Farnborough (loan)	2	(2)

International career^{‡}
2023	Wales U15	3	(2)
2023–2024	Wales U16	10	(1)
2024	Wales U17	7	(1)
2025	Wales U18	1	(0)
2025–	Wales U19	13	(1)
- * Club domestic league appearances and goals as of 21:49, 22 October 2026 (UTC) ‡ National team caps and goals as of 19:21, 9 October 2026 (UTC)

Ollie Joseph Dewsbury (born 22 February 2008) is a Welsh footballer who plays as a forward for Farnborough on loan from EFL League Two club Bristol Rovers. He is a Wales under-19 international.

== Early life and education ==
Dewsbury attended Bassaleg School in Newport, Wales.

== Career ==
Dewsbury joined Bristol Rovers at pre-academy level aged seven. On 4 November 2023, Dewsbury made his senior debut as a late substitute in a 7–2 FA Cup First Round victory over Whitby Town, having previously impressed first-team interim manager Andy Mangan in an FA Youth Cup tie. At the age of 15 years and 255 days, he became the second youngest player to ever represent the club and the youngest to do so in the FA Cup.

Following a promising pre-season, Dewsbury once again found himself involved in the first-team during the early stages of the 2024–25 season, making a second senior appearance as a late substitute in a 3–3 EFL Trophy draw with Tottenham Hotspur U21. In September 2024, Dewsbury, alongside teammate Jerry Lawrence, joined Southern League Division One South club Yate Town. On 1 October 2024, he scored a first senior goal with the second in a 2–0 away victory over Cinderford Town. On 14 November 2024, the loan was extended. He returned to Bristol Rovers in January 2025, before joining Taunton Town on loan for an initial month before being later extended.

On 8 March 2025, having been recalled from his loan spell, Dewsbury made his league debut for Bristol Rovers as a late substitute in a 1–0 victory over Huddersfield Town. He was selected by Academy manager Byron Anthony as Bristol Rovers Trainee of the Year for the 2024–25 season. On 18 July 2025, he signed a first professional contract with Bristol Rovers.

On 9 January 2026, Dewsbury joined National League South club Weston-super-Mare on loan for the remainder of the season.

At the 2026 EFL Awards, Dewsbury was named League Two Apprentice of the Season for the 2025–26 season.

In July 2026, Dewsbury trained with Everton on trial amid reported interest from other Premier League clubs Arsenal and Fulham.

On 9 October 2026, Dewsbury joined National League South club Farnborough on a one-month loan deal.

== International career ==
In November 2023, Dewsbury was named in the Wales U16 squad for the upcoming Victory Shield tournament.

In August 2024, Dewsbury was called up to the Wales U17 squad for the first time, before earning a call-up to the U18 squad in March 2025.

== Career statistics ==
As of match played 22 October 2026

Appearances and goals by club, season and competition
Club	Season	League			FA Cup		League Cup		Other		Total	
Club	Season	Division	Apps	Goals	Apps	Goals	Apps	Goals	Apps	Goals	Apps	Goals
Bristol Rovers	2023–24	League One	0	0	1	0	0	0	0	0	1	0
Bristol Rovers	2024–25	League One	6	0	0	0	0	0	1 (Note: Appearance(s) in EFL Trophy)	0	7	0
Bristol Rovers	2025–26	League Two	12	0	0	0	1	0	1	0	14	0
Bristol Rovers	2026–27	League Two	0	0	0	0	0	0	1	0	1	0
Bristol Rovers	Total		18	0	1	0	1	0	3	0	23	0
Yate Town (loan)	2024–25	Southern League Division One South	11	4	—		—		3 (Note: Appearance(s) in FA Trophy)	2	14	6
Taunton Town (loan)	2024–25	Southern League Premier Division South	5	1	—		—		1 (Note: Appearance in Somerset Premier Cup)	0	6	1
Weston-super-Mare (loan)	2025–26	National League South	18	3	1	0	—		2 (Note: Appearances in National League South play-offs)	0	21	3
Farnborough (loan)	2026–27	National League South	2	2	—		—		0	0	2	2
Career total			54	10	2	0	1	0	9	2	66	12

== Honours ==
Individual

- Bristol Rovers Trainee of the Year: 2024–25
- EFL League Two Apprentice of the Season: 2025–26
