= Sil Swinkels =

Dutch footballer (born 2004)

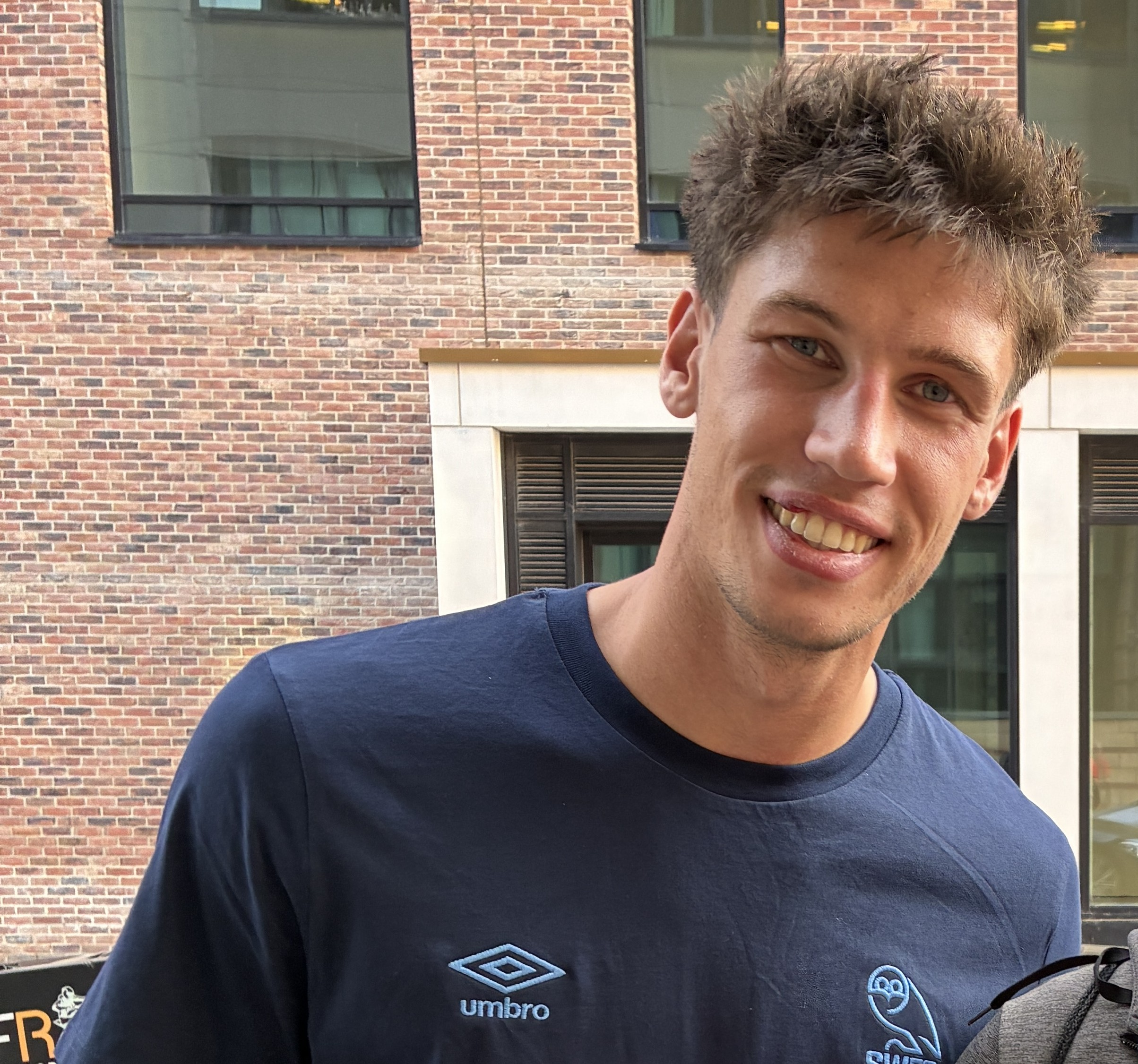
- Swinkels in 2026

Personal information
- Full name: Sil Laurentius Swinkels
- Date of birth: 6 January 2004 (age 22)
- Place of birth: Sint-Oedenrode, Netherlands
- Height: 1.90 m (6 ft 3 in)
- Position: Centre-back

Team information
- Current team: Sheffield Wednesday
- Number: 26

Youth career
- RKSV Rhode
- Helmond Sport
- Brabant United
- 2017–2020: Vitesse Arnhem
- 2020–2021: Aston Villa

Senior career*
Years	Team	Apps	(Gls)
2021–2026	Aston Villa	0	(0)
2025	→ Bristol Rovers (loan)	14	(2)
2025–2026	→ Exeter City (loan)	7	(0)
2026	→ Chesterfield (loan)	22	(0)
2026–	Sheffield Wednesday	6	(0)

International career
2019–2020	Netherlands U15	2	(0)
2021–2022	Netherlands U18	4	(1)
- * Club domestic league appearances and goals as of 22:02, 20 November 2026 (UTC)

Sil Laurentius Swinkels (born 6 January 2004) is a Dutch footballer who currently plays as a centre-back for EFL League One club Sheffield Wednesday. Swinkels has played for the Netherlands internationally at youth levels up to under-18.

== Early life ==
Swinkels was born in Sint-Oedenrode in the south of the Netherlands in 2004.

== Club career ==
=== Youth career ===
Having played youth football for Dutch sides RKSV Rhode, Helmond Sport, Brabant United and Vitesse Arnhem, he joined Aston Villa's academy in summer 2020.

Swinkels made an unexpected first team debut for Aston Villa when, due to a COVID-19 outbreak, Villa were forced to play an inexperienced squad in an FA Cup third-round tie against Liverpool on 8 January 2021.

On 24 May 2021, Swinkels was part of the Aston Villa U18s team that won the FA Youth Cup, beating Liverpool U18s 2–1 in the final. On 10 August 2021, he signed his first professional contract with Aston Villa.

In March 2023, Swinkels suffered a torn ACL in a Premier League 2 match against Southampton B which he confirmed would result in an extended period on the sidelines. Swinkels eventually returned to football on 8 April 2024, in a 4–0 defeat for Villa U21s against Chelsea U21s. After coming back from injury and playing a part in Aston Villa U21s reaching the Premier League 2 play-offs and winning the Birmingham Senior Cup, on 17 May 2024, Swinkels signed a contract extension with Aston Villa.

=== Aston Villa ===
On 24 September 2024, Swinkels made his first appearance for the senior Aston Villa team for the first time since 2021 during a 2–1 away victory against Wycombe Wanderers in the EFL Cup. Swinkels was a regular substitute option for Villa in the 2024-25 UEFA Champions League and 2024-25 Premier League over the first half of the season but did not appear.

On 28 November 2024, Swinkels signed another contract extension with Aston Villa.

On 3 February 2025, Swinkels signed for EFL League One club Bristol Rovers on loan until the end of the season. Swinkels made his English Football League debut on 11 February 2025, scoring a 91st-minute equaliser in a match against Stockport County.

On 17 July 2025, Swinkels returned to League One, joining Exeter City on a season-long loan deal.

On 4 January 2026, Swinkels was recalled from his loan at Exeter, and immediately loaned out to EFL League Two club Chesterfield for the rest of the season. Swinkels made his Chesterfield debut only one hour after his transfer was announced, playing 90 minutes in a 2–2 draw against Milton Keynes Dons.

=== Sheffield Wednesday ===
On 2 July 2026, Swinkels joined EFL League One club Sheffield Wednesday for an undisclosed fee, signing a three-year contract. He was one of eight players to make their debut against Bolton Wanderers in the EFL Cup, starting the game in a 1–0 win. He suffered a setback early into the season, with a hamstring injury he picked up in the EFL Cup second round against Wolverhampton Wanderers, with manager Henrik Pedersen ruling him out for three to four weeks. He returned against Cambridge United as a late substitute in October.

== International career ==
Swinkels played for Netherlands at the under-15 level. On 6 September 2021, Swinkels made his debut for Netherlands U18 in a 5–0 friendly victory over Italy. He scored his first goal at youth international level for Netherlands U18s, on 28 March 2022, in a 4–1 away victory over Germany.

== Career statistics ==
=== Club ===
As of 20 November 2026

Club	Season	League			National Cup		League Cup		Other		Total	
Club	Season	Division	Apps	Goals	Apps	Goals	Apps	Goals	Apps	Goals	Apps	Goals
Aston Villa	2020–21	Premier League	0	0	1	0	0	0	0	0	1	0
Aston Villa	2021–22	Premier League	0	0	0	0	0	0	4 (Note: Appearance(s) in EFL Trophy)	0	4	0
Aston Villa	2022–23	Premier League	0	0	0	0	0	0	0	0	0	0
Aston Villa	2023–24	Premier League	0	0	0	0	0	0	0	0	0	0
Aston Villa	2024–25	Premier League	0	0	0	0	1	0	2	0	3	0
Aston Villa	2025–26	Premier League	0	0	0	0	0	0	0	0	0	0
Aston Villa	Total		0	0	1	0	1	0	6	0	8	0
Bristol Rovers (loan)	2024–25	League One	14	2	–		–		0	0	14	2
Exeter City (loan)	2025–26	League One	7	0	1	0	0	0	3	0	11	0
Chesterfield (loan)	2025–26	League Two	22	0	–		–		2 (Note: Appearance(s) in League Two play-offs)	0	24	0
Sheffield Wednesday	2026–27	League One	6	0	0	0	2	0	0	0	8	0
Career total			47	2	2	0	3	0	11	0	63	2

== Honours ==
Aston Villa U18s

- FA Youth Cup: 2020–21

Aston Villa U21s

- Birmingham Senior Cup: 2023-24
