= West Sussex Fire and Rescue Service =

Fire and rescue service for West Sussex, England

Operational area
- Country: England
- County: West Sussex

Agency overview
- Employees: ~1,000
- Chief Fire Officer: Sabrina Cohen-Hatton

Facilities and equipment
- Divisions: 2
- Battalions: 0
- Stations: 25
- Engines: 35
- Platforms: 2
- Rescues: 3
- HAZMAT: 1
- USAR: 6
- Fireboats: 0
- Rescue boats: 2

Website
- www.westsussex.gov.uk/fire-emergencies-and-crime/west-sussex-fire-and-rescue-service/

West Sussex Fire and Rescue Service is the statutory fire and rescue service for the administrative county of West Sussex, England. It is part of West Sussex County Council. As of March 2018, the county has 25 fire stations.

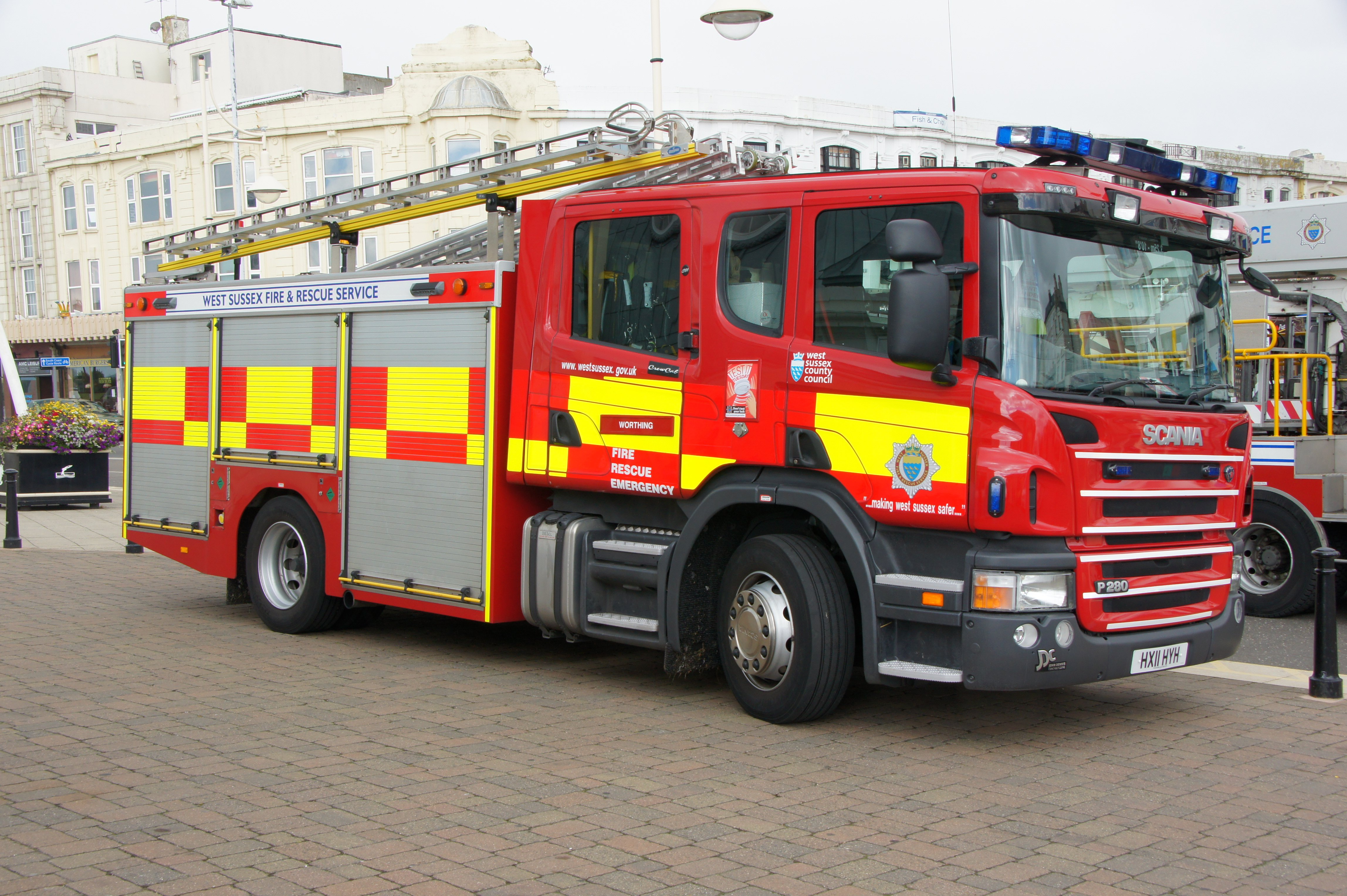
Water ladder appliance

== Performance ==
Every fire and rescue service in England and Wales is periodically subjected to a statutory inspection by His Majesty's Inspectorate of Constabulary and Fire & Rescue Services (HMICFRS). The inspections investigate how well the service performs in each of three areas. On a scale of outstanding, good, requires improvement and inadequate, West Sussex Fire and Rescue Service was rated as follows:

HMICFRS Inspection West Sussex
Area	Rating 2018/19	Rating 2021/22	Description
Effectiveness	Requires improvement	Requires improvement	How effective is the fire and rescue service at keeping people safe and secure from fire and other risks?
Efficiency	Requires improvement	Good	How efficient is the fire and rescue service at keeping people safe and secure from fire and other risks?
People	Inadequate	Requires improvement	How well does the fire and rescue service look after its people?

== Fire stations ==
The service has 25 fire stations, which are operated according to the following crewing systems:

- Wholetime – full-time firefighters are at the station 24/7 and run on watches which change every 12 hours
- Retained – on-call retained firefighters are called to the station via pagers. Therefore, they are not always on station
- Day-crewed – full-time firefighters are in the station during the day but not the night

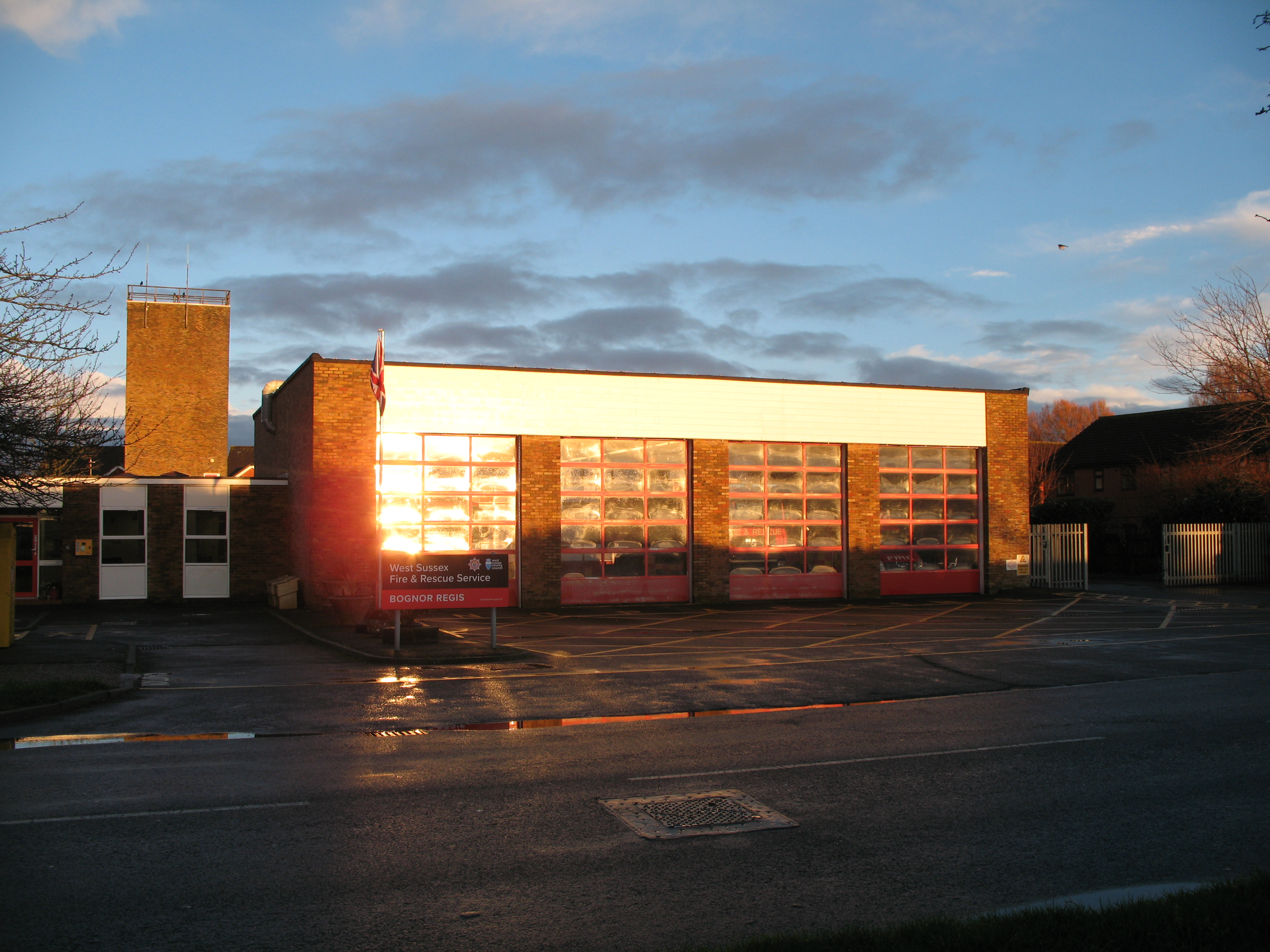
A photo of Bognor Regis fire station

== See also ==
- Fire service in the United Kingdom
- List of British firefighters killed in the line of duty

=== Other West Sussex emergency services ===
- Sussex Police
- South East Coast Ambulance Service
