= Jerry Lawrence (footballer) =

English footballer

Personal information
- Full name: Jerry Karl Sonzahi Lawrence
- Date of birth: 5 March 2005 (age 21)
- Position: Midfielder

Team information
- Current team: Corsham Town

Youth career
- Bristol Rovers

Senior career*
Years	Team	Apps	(Gls)
2022–2025	Bristol Rovers	1	(0)
2022–2023	→ Salisbury (loan)	7	(1)
2023–2024	→ Tiverton Town (loan)	11	(2)
2024	→ Yate Town (loan)	4	(1)
2024–2025	→ Bath City (loan)	10	(0)
2025	→ Hungerford Town (loan)	8	(0)
2025–	Corsham Town	0	(0)
- * Club domestic league appearances and goals as of 16:23, 30 April 2025 (UTC)

Jerry Karl Sonzahi Lawrence (born 5 March 2005) is an English footballer who plays as a midfielder for Hellenic League Premier Division club Corsham Town.

== Career ==
=== Bristol Rovers ===
Lawrence joined Bristol Rovers at under-12s level, having initially been rejected for a trial for the under-8s. At the end of the 2021–22 season, Lawrence was awarded the U18 Player of the Year award.

Ahead of the 2022–23 season, Lawrence was promoted to training with the first-team over pre-season, impressing in the first friendly as he scored the second in a 6–1 friendly victory over Melksham Town. On 6 August 2022, Lawrence made his senior first-team debut when he came off the bench as a late substitute in a 4–0 away thrashing of Burton Albion. On 10 October 2022, Lawrence signed his first professional contract with the club, a two-year deal. On 4 November 2022, Lawrence joined Southern League Premier Division South club Salisbury on a one-month loan deal. In January 2023, the loan was extended for a further month. He returned to his parent club in February 2023.

In October 2023, Lawrence joined Tiverton Town on loan. He returned to his parent club in February 2024. Having featured in four matchday squads across the 2023–24 season without making an appearance, the club activated a one-year contract extension in May 2024.

On 27 September 2024, Lawrence joined Yate Town on an initial one-month loan deal. On 5 November 2024, he joined National League South club Bath City on a further one-month loan. On 17 January 2025, he joined Hungerford Town on a youth-loan.

Lawrence was released by Bristol Rovers at the end of the 2024–25 season.

=== Non-League ===
On 30 May 2025, Lawrence agreed to join Hellenic League Premier Division side Corsham Town.

== Career statistics ==
As of end of the 2024–25 season

Appearances and goals by club, season and competition
Club	Season	League			FA Cup		League Cup		Other		Total	
Club	Season	Division	Apps	Goals	Apps	Goals	Apps	Goals	Apps	Goals	Apps	Goals
Bristol Rovers	2022–23	League One	1	0	0	0	0	0	2 (Note: Appearance(s) in EFL Trophy)	0	3	0
Bristol Rovers	2023–24	League One	0	0	0	0	0	0	0	0	0	0
Bristol Rovers	2024–25	League One	0	0	0	0	0	0	0	0	0	0
Bristol Rovers	Total		1	0	0	0	0	0	2	0	3	0
Salisbury (loan)	2022–23	SL Premier Division South	7	1	—		—		0	0	7	1
Tiverton Town (loan)	2023–24	SL Premier Division South	11	2	—		—		1 (Note: Appearance in Devon St Lukes Challenge Cup)	0	12	2
Yate Town (loan)	2024–25	SL Division One South	4	1	—		—		2 (Note: Appearance(s) in FA Trophy)	0	6	1
Bath City (loan)	2024–25	National League South	10	0	—		—		1 (Note: Appearance in Somerset Premier Cup)	0	11	0
Hungerford Town (loan)	2024–25	SL Premier Division South	8	0	0	0	—		1 (Note: BBSC)	0	9	0
Career total			41	4	0	0	0	0	7	0	48	4
