= Luke Thomas (footballer, born 1999) =

English footballer

Personal information
- Full name: Luke Gerald Michael Thomas
- Date of birth: 19 February 1999 (age 27)
- Place of birth: Soudley, England
- Height: 1.71 m (5 ft 7 in)
- Positions: Midfielder; forward

Team information
- Current team: St Mirren
- Number: 16

Youth career
- West Bromwich Albion
- –2015: Cheltenham Town

Senior career*
Years	Team	Apps	(Gls)
2015–2016	Cheltenham Town	0	(0)
2016–2019	Derby County	2	(0)
2017	→ Gloucester City (loan)	15	(1)
2018–2019	→ Coventry City (loan)	43	(4)
2019–2023	Barnsley	86	(3)
2021	→ Ipswich Town (loan)	5	(0)
2021–2022	→ Bristol Rovers (loan)	28	(0)
2023–2026	Bristol Rovers	104	(9)
2026–	St Mirren	4	(0)

International career^{‡}
2019–2020	England U20	3	(0)
- * Club domestic league appearances and goals as of 17:45, 1 August 2026 (UTC) ‡ National team caps and goals as of 21:32, 9 September 2019 (UTC)

Luke Gerald Michael Thomas (born 19 February 1999) is an English professional footballer who plays as winger for Scottish Premiership club St Mirren.

Thomas began his career with Cheltenham Town, before later playing for Derby County and Barnsley. He has also featured on loan for Gloucester City, Coventry City and Ipswich Town.

== Club career ==
Thomas began his career with National League club Cheltenham Town, making his only first team appearance against Chelmsford City in the FA Trophy. He had a trial with Portuguese club Benfica in 2015. He joined Derby County in January 2016 for an undisclosed transfer fee, signing a two-and-a-half-year professional contract. He had a loan spell with National League North club Gloucester City during the 2016–17 season.

Thomas was nominated for the Premier League 2 Player of the Month award in September 2017 as a result of his performances for Derby County's under-23 team. He signed a new three-year contract with Derby in October 2017. He was first named in a first team matchday squad on 31 October 2017 against Leeds United, and made his league debut on 21 November 2017, coming on as an 89th-minute substitute for Tom Lawrence in a 2–0 win over Queens Park Rangers.

Thomas signed a new four-year contract with Derby in August 2018. Later that month, he joined League One Coventry City on a half-season loan until the start of 2019. In January 2019, the loan was extended for the rest of the season.

=== Barnsley ===
In June 2019, he joined Barnsley for an undisclosed fee. On his debut he scored the winning goal for Barnsley in a 1–0 win against Fulham.

In January 2021, Thomas joined Ipswich Town on loan for the remainder of the season. On 8 April 2021, Thomas announced on social media that he had cut his loan move with Ipswich short for personal reasons and he returned to Barnsley.

==== Bristol Rovers (loan) ====
On 10 July 2021, Thomas joined League Two side Bristol Rovers on a season-long loan deal. On 13 October, he scored his first goal for the club when he opened the scoring in a 2–1 EFL Trophy defeat to Chelsea U21s. On 23 November 2021, Thomas came off the bench in a 1–1 draw against nine-men Salford City, missing a great chance to put Rovers two ahead before the home side eventually equalised. After the match, Thomas' manager Joey Barton criticised Thomas claiming that he "thinks the world owes him a favour" and that "if he doesn't get his finger out, this opportunity at Rovers is going to pass him by". Barton continued with his criticism of Thomas the following day, claiming that the club had tried to terminate his loan in the summer, the same window in which Thomas had been signed after the player had stormed out of training a number of times in frustration. In January 2022, Thomas admitted that he deserved the criticism and had let people down. The season ended with Rovers getting promoted on the final day of the season, moving into the automatic promotion spots on goals scored.

=== Return to Barnsley ===
After speculation surrounding Thomas and a permanent return to Bristol Rovers, he found himself in the first team picture under new manager Michael Duff and scored the only goal in the second match of the season as Duff was given his first win in charge over Thomas' former club Cheltenham Town. On 8 October 2022, it was confirmed that Thomas had suffered a broken leg in training that would see the winger out of action for at least four months. Following defeat in the play-off final, he was offered a new contract at the end of the 2022–23 season.

=== Bristol Rovers ===
On 24 June 2023, Thomas' return to Bristol Rovers was confirmed, signing a three-year deal. He scored his first league goal for the club on his second debut, an opening day draw with Portsmouth. On 30 September 2023, Thomas suffered a tight hamstring during half-time of a 2–0 defeat to Peterborough United, failing to tell the club's medical staff until the end of the half-time break, with the opposition going on to score early in to the second period. Following the match, manager Joey Barton launched an angry tirade toward the player, blaming him for the second goal and criticising his character, demanding that the player should be fined by the club and threatening his future at the club. It was later revealed that he would miss a number of weeks with a hamstring injury. Following the appointment of new manager Matt Taylor in December 2023, Thomas saw himself switched to a more unfamiliar right wing-back position. He impressed from this new role, considered as one of his side's best players over the busy Christmas period, notably scoring a last-minute winner against leaders Portsmouth on Boxing Day.

During his second season back at the club permanently, Thomas once again found himself out of favour with manager Matt Taylor, struggling for minutes ahead of summer signing Shaq Forde.

He departed the club upon the expiry of his contract at the end of the 2025–26 season.

=== St Mirren ===
On 1 August 2026, Thomas joined Scottish Premiership club St Mirren on an initial two-year deal, with the club holding the option for a further year.

== International career ==
Thomas made his youth international debut on 6 September 2019 with England U20, coming on as an 80th minute substitute for Luke Bolton in a 0–0 draw against Netherlands U20 at New Meadow.

== Career statistics ==
As of end of 2025–26 season

Appearances and goals by club, season and competition
Club	Season	League			FA Cup		League Cup		Other		Total	
Club	Season	Division	Apps	Goals	Apps	Goals	Apps	Goals	Apps	Goals	Apps	Goals
Cheltenham Town	2015–16	National League	0	0	0	0	—		2 (Note: Appearances in FA Trophy)	0	2	0
Derby County	2015–16	Championship	0	0	0	0	0	0	0	0	0	0
Derby County	2016–17	Championship	0	0	0	0	0	0	—		0	0
Derby County	2017–18	Championship	2	0	0	0	0	0	0	0	2	0
Derby County	2018–19	Championship	0	0	0	0	0	0	0	0	0	0
Derby County	Total		2	0	0	0	0	0	0	0	2	0
Gloucester City (loan)	2016–17	National League North	15	1	0	0	—		0	0	15	1
Coventry City (loan)	2018–19	League One	43	4	1	1	0	0	0	0	44	5
Barnsley	2019–20	Championship	39	1	2	1	1	0	—		42	2
Barnsley	2020–21	Championship	19	0	1	0	2	0	—		22	0
Barnsley	2021–22	Championship	0	0	0	0	0	0	0	0	0	0
Barnsley	2022–23	League One	27	2	0	0	2	0	2 (Note: Appearance(s) in EFL League One play-offs)	0	31	2
Barnsley	Total		84	3	3	1	5	0	2	0	94	4
Ipswich Town (loan)	2020–21	League One	5	0	0	0	0	0	0	0	5	0
Bristol Rovers (loan)	2021–22	League Two	28	0	2	0	1	0	1 (Note: Appearance(s) in EFL Trophy)	1	32	1
Bristol Rovers	2023–24	League One	37	5	4	1	1	0	4	1	46	7
Bristol Rovers	2024–25	League One	36	2	2	0	1	0	2	0	41	2
Bristol Rovers	2025–26	League Two	31	2	2	0	1	0	5	2	39	4
Bristol Rovers	Total		132	9	10	1	4	0	12	4	158	14
Career total			282	17	14	3	9	0	16	4	321	24

== Honours ==
Bristol Rovers

- EFL League Two third-place promotion: 2021–22
