= 2025–26 Bristol Rovers F.C. season =

143rd season in existence of Bristol Rovers FC

Bristol Rovers
2025–26 season
- Owner: Hussain Al-Saeed
- Head Coach: Darrell Clarke (until 13 December); Steve Evans (from 16 December)
- Stadium: Memorial Stadium
- League Two: 14th
- FA Cup: Second round
- EFL Cup: First round
- EFL Trophy: Third round
- Top goalscorer: League: Fabrizio Cavegn; Ellis Harrison (both 11); All: Fabrizio Cavegn (15)
- Highest home attendance: 11,126 vs. Cheltenham Town (25 April 2026)
- Lowest home attendance: 878 vs. Cambridge United (2 December 2025, EFL Trophy Second round)
- Average home league attendance: 8,051

The 2025–26 season is the 143rd season in the history of Bristol Rovers Football Club and their first season back in League Two since the 2021–22 season following relegation from League One in the preceding season. In addition to the domestic league, the club would also participate in the FA Cup, the EFL Cup, and the EFL Trophy.

== Managerial changes ==
Prior to the season starting, Darrell Clarke was announced as the clubs new head coach, signing a three year deal. It would be his second spell at the club, having previously been in charge between 2014–2018. However he only lasted seven months in charge as he was sacked on 13 December after twenty-seven games in charge and a win ratio of 29.6%. Three days later, Steve Evans was appointed as head coach until the end of the season. Evans signed a new two-year deal on 11 April 2026.

== Current squad ==
As of 6 February 2026

No.	Name	Position	Nationality	Date of birth (age)	Previous club	Date signed	Fee	Contract end
Goalkeepers
1	Luke Southwood	GK	(Northern Ireland)	6 December 1997 (aged 28)	Bolton Wanderers	6 July 2025	Undisclosed	30 June 2027
13	Brad Young	GK	(England)	5 May 2002 (aged 24)	Leicester City	1 July 2025	Free	30 June 2027
Defenders
2	Joel Senior	RB	(England)	24 June 1999 (aged 27)	Morecambe	1 July 2024	Free	30 June 2026
3	Jack Sparkes	LB	(England)	29 September 2000 (aged 25)	Peterborough United	23 June 2025	Free	30 June 2027
4	Taylor Moore	CB	(England)	12 May 1997 (aged 29)	Valenciennes	1 July 2024	Free	30 June 2027
5	Alfie Kilgour	CB	(England)	18 May 1998 (aged 28)	Mansfield Town	1 July 2025	Free	30 June 2027
6	Clinton Mola	LB	(England)	15 March 2001 (aged 25)	Reading	1 July 2024	Free	30 June 2027
12	Tom Lockyer	CB	(Wales)	3 December 1994 (aged 31)	Luton Town	23 October 2025	Free	30 June 2026
17	Kofi Balmer	CB	(Northern Ireland)	19 September 2000 (aged 25)	Motherwell	12 January 2026	Loan	31 May 2026
23	Macauley Southam-Hales	RB	(Wales)	2 February 1996 (aged 30)	Stockport County	1 July 2025	Free	30 June 2027
26	Riley Harbottle	CB	(England)	26 September 2000 (aged 25)	AFC Wimbledon	16 January 2026	Free	30 June 2028
Midfielders
14	Kane Thompson-Sommers	CM	(England)	1 December 2000 (aged 25)	Milton Keynes Dons	16 January 2026	Loan	31 May 2026
15	Ryan de Havilland	CM	(England)	15 June 2001 (aged 25)	Peterborough United	3 January 2026	Undisclosed	30 June 2028
20	Josh McEachran	CM	(England)	1 March 1993 (aged 33)	Oxford United	1 July 2025	Free	30 June 2027
24	Tommy Leigh	CM	(England)	13 April 2000 (aged 26)	Bradford City	2 February 2026	Loan	31 May 2026
25	Ryan Howley	CM	(Wales)	23 November 2003 (aged 22)	Coventry City	8 July 2025	Free	30 June 2027
36	Richard Smallwood	CM	(England)	29 December 1990 (aged 35)	Tranmere Rovers	2 February 2026	Loan	31 May 2026
Forwards
7	Shaq Forde	CF	(England)	5 May 2004 (aged 22)	Watford	30 August 2024	Undisclosed	30 June 2027
9	Promise Omochere	RW	(Republic of Ireland)	18 October 2000 (aged 25)	Fleetwood Town	19 July 2024	£500,000	30 June 2027
10	Yusuf Akhamrich	LW	(Morocco)	5 September 2005 (aged 20)	Tottenham Hotspur	22 January 2026	Loan	31 May 2026
11	Luke Thomas	RW	(England)	19 February 1999 (aged 27)	Barnsley	1 July 2023	Free	30 June 2026
19	Ellis Harrison	CF	(Wales)	29 January 1994 (aged 32)	Milton Keynes Dons	29 July 2025	Free	30 June 2026
27	Joe Quigley	CF	(Republic of Ireland)	10 December 1996 (aged 29)	Oldham Athletic	2 February 2026	Undisclosed	30 June 2028
29	Fabrizio Cavegn	CF	(Switzerland)	28 August 2002 (aged 23)	Vaduz	1 August 2025	Undisclosed	30 June 2028
35	Mees Rijks	CF	(Netherlands)	8 March 2003 (aged 23)	Vålerenga	27 January 2026	Undisclosed	30 June 2028
Out on loan
8	Isaac Hutchinson	AM	(England)	10 April 2000 (aged 26)	Walsall	20 June 2024	Undisclosed	30 June 2027
22	Kamil Conteh	DM	(Sierra Leone)	26 December 2002 (aged 23)	Grimsby Town	26 January 2024	£300,000	30 June 2027
31	Jed Ward	GK	(England)	20 May 2003 (aged 23)	Academy	1 July 2023	Trainee	30 June 2028
43	Ollie Dewsbury	CF	(Wales)	22 February 2008 (aged 18)	Academy	1 July 2023	Trainee	30 June 2027

== Transfers and contracts ==
=== In ===
Date	Pos.	Player	From	Fee	Ref.
23 June 2025	LB	(England) Jack Sparkes	(England) Peterborough United	Free transfer	
1 July 2025 (Note: The transfer was announced on 25 June, and would become official on July 1 once his Mansfield Town contract expired)	CB	(England) Alfie Kilgour	(England) Mansfield Town	Free	
1 July 2025 (Note: The transfer was announced on 30 June, and would become official on July 1 once his Oxford United contract expired)	CM	(England) Josh McEachran	(England) Oxford United	Free	
1 July 2025 (Note: The transfer was announced on 25 June, and would become official on July 1 once his Stockport County contract expired)	RB	(Wales) Macauley Southam-Hales	(England) Stockport County	Free	
1 July 2025 (Note: The transfer was announced on 26 June, and would become official on July 1 once his Leicester City contract expired)	GK	(England) Brad Young	(England) Leicester City	Free	
6 July 2025	GK	(England) Luke Southwood	(England) Bolton Wanderers	Undisclosed	
8 July 2025	CM	(Wales) Ryan Howley	(England) Coventry City	Free	
29 July 2025	CF	(Wales) Ellis Harrison	(England) Milton Keynes Dons	Free	
1 August 2025	CF	(Switzerland) Fabrizio Cavegn	(Liechtenstein) Vaduz	Undisclosed	
23 October 2025	CB	(Wales) Tom Lockyer	(England) Luton Town	Free	
28 November 2025	CF	(England) Callum Morton	(England) Salford City	Free	
3 January 2026	CM	(England) Ryan de Havilland	(England) Peterborough United	Undisclosed	
16 January 2026	CB	(England) Riley Harbottle	(England) AFC Wimbledon	Undisclosed	
27 January 2026	CF	(Netherlands) Mees Rijks	(Norway) Vålerenga	Undisclosed	
2 February 2026	CF	(Republic of Ireland) Joe Quigley	(England) Oldham Athletic	Undisclosed	

=== Out ===
Date	Pos.	Player	To	Fee	Ref.
1 August 2025	CAM	(England) Kofi Shaw	(England) Brighton & Hove Albion	Undisclosed	
6 August 2025	CB	(England) Connor Taylor	(England) Wycombe Wanderers	Undisclosed	
24 October 2025	CB	(England) Dan Ellison	(England) Yeovil Town	Undisclosed	
15 January 2026	LB	(England) Bryant Bilongo	(England) Rochdale	Undisclosed	
21 January 2026	CF	(Cyprus) Ruel Sotiriou	(Israel) Hapoel Jerusalem	Undisclosed	

=== Loaned in ===
Date	Pos.	Player	From	Date until	Ref.
14 August 2025	CB	(Poland) Kacper Łopata	(England) Barnsley	6 January 2026	(Note: Lopata, Chang, Cotterill, Issaka and Negru all returned to their parent clubs early on 6 January 2026)
1 September 2025	CDM	(England) Alfie Chang	(England) Birmingham City	6 January 2026	
1 September 2025	CM	(Wales) Joel Cotterill	(Wales) Swansea City	6 January 2026	
1 September 2025	LW	(Wales) Freddie Issaka	(England) Plymouth Argyle	6 January 2026	
1 September 2025	CB	(Moldova) Stephan Negru	(England) Oxford United	6 January 2026	
12 January 2026	CB	(Northern Ireland) Kofi Balmer	(Scotland) Motherwell	31 May 2026	
16 January 2026	CM	(England) Kane Thompson-Sommers	(England) Milton Keynes Dons	31 May 2026	
22 January 2026	LW	(Morocco) Yusuf Akhamrich	(England) Tottenham Hotspur	31 May 2026	
2 February 2026	CAM	(England) Tommy Leigh	(England) Bradford City	31 May 2026	
2 February 2026	CDM	(England) Richard Smallwood	(England) Tranmere Rovers	31 May 2026	

=== Loaned out ===
Date	Pos.	Player	To	Date until	Ref.
1 August 2025	CM	(England) Charlie Moody	(England) Yate Town		
1 August 2025	GK	(England) Jed Ward	(England) Yeovil Town	31 May 2026	
1 August 2025	CB	(England) Charlie White	(England) Yate Town		
1 September 2025	CM	(England) Isaac Hutchinson	(England) Cheltenham Town	6 January 2026 (Note: On 6 January, Hutchinson was recalled from his loan)	
19 September 2025	LW	(England) Micah Anthony	(England) Kettering Town	2 November 2025	
19 September 2025	CB	(England) Dan Ellison	(England) Chippenham Town	23 October 2025 (Note: On 23 October, Ellison was recalled from his loan)	
21 November 2025	CB	(England) Rocco Sughayer	(England) Didcot Town	20 March 2026 (Note: On 20 February, Sughayer's loan at Didcot Town was extended for a further month)	
28 November 2025	CM	(England) Tom English	(England) Taunton Town	27 December 2025	
9 January 2026	CF	(Wales) Ollie Dewsbury	(England) Weston-super-Mare	31 May 2026	
2 February 2026	CM	(Sierra Leone) Kamil Conteh	(England) Lincoln City	31 May 2026	
2 February 2026	CM	(England) Isaac Hutchinson	(England) Cheltenham Town	31 May 2026	
6 February 2026	CM	(Wales) Ryan Howley	(England) Tamworth	31 May 2026	

=== Released / out of contract ===
Date	Pos.	Player	Subsequent club	Join date	Ref.
8 June 2025	CM	(Scotland) Jamie Lindsay	(Scotland) Ross County	18 July 2025	
25 June 2025	CB	(Wales) James Wilson	(England) Cheltenham Town	28 July 2025	
30 June 2025	CM	(England) Jerry Lawrence	(England) Corsham Town	1 July 2025	
30 June 2025	AM	(Jamaica) Jevani Brown	(England) Hemel Hempstead Town	12 September 2025	
30 June 2025	GK	(England) Matt Hall	(England) AFC Totton	25 October 2025	
30 June 2025	RB	(England) Jack Hunt	(England) Stockport County	18 November 2025	
30 June 2025	CM	(England) Luke McCormick	(England) Yeovil Town	4 August 2025	
30 June 2025	RM	(England) Grant Ward	(England) Port Vale	9 February 2026	
30 June 2025	CM	(Saint Kitts and Nevis) Romaine Sawyers			
30 June 2025	LW	(England) Scott Sinclair			
4 February 2026	LW	(England) Micah Anthony	(England) Farnborough	28 February 2026	
7 February 2026	CF	(England) Callum Morton	(England) Worthing	6 March 2026	

=== New contract ===
Date	Pos.	Player	Contract until	Ref.
18 July 2025	LW	(Wales) Ollie Dewsbury	Undisclosed (Note: First professional contract)	
23 July 2025	CM	(England) Charlie Moody	Undisclosed	

== Pre-season and friendlies ==
On 19 May, Bristol Rovers announced their first two pre-season friendlies, against Chippenham Town and Bath City. Two days later, a third fixture was confirmed against Yeovil Town. A warm-weather training camp in Murcia was next to be added, which included a clash against Stockport County. On 3 June, a home friendly against Coventry City was announced. A sixth pre-season fixture was later confirmed, against Oxford United.

Win Draw Loss Fixtures

4 July 2025 Friendly	Chippenham Town	1–2	Bristol Rovers	Chippenham
19:30 BST	Touray 43'	Report	Sotiriou 11'; Anthony 66'	Stadium: The Thornbury Surfacing Stadium; Attendance: 1,465

12 July 2025 Friendly	Bristol Rovers	2–3	Stockport County	San Pedro del Pinatar, Spain
11:30 CEST	Dewsbury 63'; Thomas 67'	Report	Norwood 32'; Fiorini 50'; Gardner 89'	Stadium: Pinatar Arena; Referee: Cuadrado Garcia

16 July 2025 Friendly	Bath City	0–1	Bristol Rovers	Bath
19:00 BST		Report	Bilongo 69'	Stadium: Twerton Park; Attendance: 2,205; Referee: Sam Read

19 July 2025 Friendly	Yeovil Town	1–2	Bristol Rovers	Yeovil
15:00 BST	Young 22' (o.g.)	Report	Shaw 48'; Thomas 62'	Stadium: Huish Park; Attendance: 2,236

23 July 2025 Friendly	Bristol Rovers	0–2	Coventry City	Bristol
19:00 BST		Report	Southam-Hales 63' (o.g.); Kesler-Hayden 81'	Stadium: Memorial Stadium; Attendance: 4,134 (1,393 Away); Referee: Steve Martin

26 July 2025 Friendly	Oxford United	0–1	Bristol Rovers	Littlemore
15:00 BST		Report	Anthony 77'	Stadium: Kassam Stadium; Referee: Steve Martin

== Competitions ==
=== League Two ===
==== League table ====
Pos	Team	Pld	W	D	L	GF	GA	GD	Pts
12	Colchester United	46	18	12	16	62	49	+13	66
13	Walsall	46	18	11	17	56	56	0	65
14	Bristol Rovers	46	19	5	22	56	65	−9	62
15	Fleetwood Town	46	15	16	15	57	58	−1	61
16	Accrington Stanley	46	14	11	21	47	58	−11	53

Source: EFL Official Website
Rules for classification: 1) Points; 2) Goal difference; 3) Number of goals scored; 4) Head-to-head results; 5) Wins; 6) Away goals; 7) Penalty points (sec 9.5); 8) 12-point sending off offences

==== Results summary ====
Overall								Home						Away					
Pld	W	D	L	GF	GA	GD	Pts	W	D	L	GF	GA	GD	W	D	L	GF	GA	GD
46	19	5	22	56	65	−9	62	12	1	10	31	28	+3	7	4	12	25	37	−12

Last updated: 2 May 2026.
Source: Soccerway

==== Results by round ====
Round	1	2	3	4	5	6	7	8	9	10	11	12	13	14	15	16	17	18	19	20	21	22	23	24	27	28	29	30	26^{2}	31	32	33	34	35	36	25^{1}	37	38	39	40	41	42	43	44	45	46
Ground	H	A	A	H	H	A	A	H	A	H	A	H	H	A	H	A	A	H	A	H	A	H	H	A	H	A	A	H	H	H	A	A	H	A	H	A	A	H	A	H	H	A	H	A	H	A
Result	L	L	L	D	W	W	W	W	D	W	L	L	L	L	L	L	L	L	L	L	D	L	L	W	L	L	L	W	W	L	L	L	W	D	W	W	L	W	W	W	W	W	W	W	W	D
Position	20	20	21	21	20	16	13	9	10	7	12	14	16	16	17	19	20	21	22	23	22	22	22	20	21	22	22	20	19	19	21	22	20	20	20	19	19	19	17	16	16	15	15	15	14	14

Source: Soccerway
A = Away; H = Home; W = Win; D = Draw; L = Loss; P = Postponed
Notes:
- ^{1} Matchday 25 (vs. Barrow) was postponed due to a frozen pitch.
- ^{2} Matchday 26 (vs. Walsall) was postponed due to their FA Cup involvements.

==== Matches ====
On 26 June, the League Two fixtures were announced.

Win Draw Loss Fixtures

2 August 2025 1	Bristol Rovers	0–1	Harrogate Town	Bristol
15:00 BST	Bilongo (yellow card) 90+1'	Report	McCoulsky (yellow card) 54'; Duke-McKenna 63'; O'Connor (yellow card) 77'; Hill (yellow card) 84'	Stadium: Memorial Stadium; Attendance: 9,242; Referee: Carl Brook

9 August 2025 2	Fleetwood Town	2–1	Bristol Rovers	Fleetwood
15:00 BST	Davies 26', 34' (yellow card) 83'	Report	Omochere (yellow card) 42' (goal) 74' (pen.); Thomas (yellow card) 90+5'; McEachran (yellow card) 90+7'	Stadium: Highbury Stadium; Attendance: 2,903; Referee: Seb Stockbridge

16 August 2025 3	Chesterfield	3–1	Bristol Rovers	Chesterfield
12:30 BST	McFadzean (yellow card) 15', (goal) 84'; Naylor 41', (yellow card) 51'; Daley-Campbell (yellow card) 58'; Dobra 88'	Report	Senior (red card) 39'; Sparkes (yellow card) 57'; Hutchinson 68'; Mola (yellow card) 72'; Sotiriou (yellow card) 80'	Stadium: SMH Group Stadium; Attendance: 8,013; Referee: Sam Mulhall
Note: Fixture was originally scheduled for a 15:00 kick-off, but was moved live Sky Sports broadcasting.

19 August 2025 4	Bristol Rovers	0–0	Oldham Athletic	Bristol
19:45 BST	Sotiriou (yellow card) 30'; Southam-Hales (yellow card) 66'; McEachran (yellow card) 79'	Report	Robson (yellow card) 45+5'; Woods (yellow card) 78'	Stadium: Memorial Stadium; Attendance: 6,706; Referee: James Oldham

23 August 2025 5	Bristol Rovers	1–0	Cambridge United	Bristol
15:00 BST	Hutchinson (yellow card) 5'; Harrison 34'; Southwood (yellow card) 41'	Report	Gibbons (yellow card) 15'; Jobe (yellow card) 80' (yellow-red card) 90+10'	Stadium: Memorial Stadium; Attendance: 6,809; Referee: Paul Marsden

30 August 2025 6	Grimsby Town	0–1	Bristol Rovers	Cleethorpes
15:00 BST	Amaluzor (yellow card) 25'	Report	Southam-Hales 27'; Łopata (yellow card) 39'; Kilgour (yellow card) 58'	Stadium: Blundell Park; Attendance: 7,406; Referee: Neil Hair

6 September 2025 7	Newport County	2–3	Bristol Rovers	Newport
12:30 BST	Baker (yellow card) 56'; Whimore 78'; Opoku 89'	Report	Southam-Hales (yellow card) 34'; Thomas 52', 59'; McEachran (yellow card) 68'; Harrison 72'; Omochere (yellow card) 90+5'	Stadium: Rodney Parade; Attendance: 5,305; Referee: Oliver Mackey
Note: Fixture was originally scheduled for a 15:00 kick-off, but was moved live Sky Sports broadcasting.

13 September 2025 8	Bristol Rovers	2–1	Barrow	Bristol
15:00 BST	McEachran 16'; Cavegn 28'; Southam-Hales (yellow card) 90+1'; Sparkes (yellow card) 90+5'	Report	Raglan (yellow card) 63'; Mahoney 69'; Fletcher (yellow card) 86'; Booty (yellow card) 89'	Stadium: Memorial Stadium; Attendance: 7,267; Referee: Sam Allison

20 September 2025 9	Colchester United	1–1	Bristol Rovers	Colchester
15:00 BST	Smith (yellow card) 21'; Mbick 52'; Read (yellow card) 79'	Report	Cavegn 40'; Thomas (yellow card) 43'; Harrison (yellow card) 45+3'; Cotterill (yellow card) 59'; Łopata (yellow card) 79'; McEachran (yellow card) 83'	Stadium: Colchester Community Stadium; Attendance: 5,050; Referee: Abigail Byrne

27 September 2025 10	Bristol Rovers	2–1	Salford City	Bristol
15:00 BST	Harrison 45+2'; Mola (yellow card) 61'; Cavegn 63'; Thomas (yellow card) 90+7'	Report	Butcher 11'; Harris (yellow card) 40'; Garbutt (yellow card) 54'; Ashley (yellow card) 57'; Mnoga (red card) 90+6'	Stadium: Memorial Stadium; Attendance: 7,601; Referee: Gareth Rhodes

4 October 2025 11	Walsall	2–1	Bristol Rovers	Walsall
15:00 BST	Pressley 69', 78'; Clarke (yellow card) 84'; Weir (yellow card) 90+3'; Comley (yellow card) 90+10'	Report	Chang (yellow card) 20'; Cavegn 27'; Harrison (yellow card) 39'; Sparkes (yellow card) 83'	Stadium: Bescot Stadium; Attendance: 8,003; Referee: Stephen Martin

11 October 2025 12	Bristol Rovers	0–4	Milton Keynes Dons	Bristol
15:00 BST	Southam-Hales (yellow card) 7'; Łopata (yellow card) 89'	Report	Kilgour 8' (o.g.); Ekpiteta (yellow card) 45'; Gilbey (yellow card) 75' (goal) 90'; Maguire 83'; Hepburn-Murphy 90+3'	Stadium: Memorial Stadium; Attendance: 7,996; Referee: Scott Oldham

18 October 2025 13	Bristol Rovers	1–4	Tranmere Rovers	Bristol
15:00 BST	Harrison (yellow card) 5'; Cavegn 85'; Kilgour (yellow card) 90+1'	Report	Smith 33'; Jennings 51', 73'; Davison (yellow card) 55' (goal) 79'; Patrick (yellow card) 71'	Stadium: Memorial Stadium; Attendance: 7,835; Referee: Thomas Parsons

25 October 2025 14	Crawley Town	4–0	Bristol Rovers	Crawley
15:00 BST	Bajrami (yellow card) 40'; Kilgour 45+9' (o.g.); Forster 52'; Malone 69'; Scott (yellow card) 78'; Flower 86'	Report	Sparkes (red card) 33'; Lockyer (yellow card) 45'; Southwood (yellow card) 45+3'; Dewsbury (yellow card) 48'	Stadium: Broadfield Stadium; Attendance: 3,416; Referee: Richard Eley

8 November 2025 15	Bristol Rovers	0–1	Gillingham	Bristol
15:00 GMT	Sotiriou (yellow card) 32'	Report	Andrews (yellow card) 31'; Clark 54'; Nevitt (yellow card) 62'; McKenzie (yellow card) 90+1'; McCleary (yellow card) 90+1'	Stadium: Memorial Stadium; Attendance: 8,056; Referee: Alan Young

15 November 2025 16	Accrington Stanley	3–1	Bristol Rovers	Accrington
15:00 GMT	Heath 6'; Walton (yellow card) 40'; Whalley (yellow card) 60'; Ward (yellow card) 62'; Rawson 72'; Sinclair 77'	Report	Chang (yellow card) 23'; Forde (yellow card) 26'; Mola (yellow card) 40'; Conteh 59'	Stadium: Crown Ground; Attendance: 2,558; Referee: Seb Stockbridge

22 November 2025 17	Cheltenham Town	1–0	Bristol Rovers	Cheltenham
15:00 GMT	Wilson (yellow card) 13'; Tomkinson (yellow card) 67', (goal) 70'; Thomas (yellow card) 79'; Adelakun (yellow card) 90+5'	Report	Conteh (yellow card) 90+4'	Stadium: Whaddon Road; Attendance: 5,465; Referee: Paul Howard

29 November 2025 18	Bristol Rovers	0–1	Notts County	Bristol
15:00 GMT	Harrison (yellow card) 34'; Mola (yellow card) 90+4'	Report	Robertson (yellow card) 18'; Bennetts (yellow card) 32'; Hall (red card) 35'; Jatta (yellow card) 53'; Dennis 86'; Gordon (yellow card) 89'; Norburn (yellow card) 90+4'	Stadium: Memorial Stadium; Attendance: 7,807; Referee: Edward Duckworth

9 December 2025 19	Barnet	4–0	Bristol Rovers	Edgware
19:45 GMT	Senior 15'; Ofoborh 30'; Slicker (yellow card) 39'; Shelton 78' (pen.); Stead 89'	Report	McEachran (yellow card) 29'	Stadium: The Hive Stadium; Attendance: 2,157 (414 away); Referee: Lee Swabey

13 December 2025 20	Bristol Rovers	0–3	Swindon Town	Bristol
12:30 GMT	Forde (yellow card) 27'; Łopata (red card) 36'	Report	Snowdon 16'; Clarke 28'; Drinan 33' (yellow card) 34' (yellow-red card) 58'	Stadium: Memorial Stadium; Attendance: 8,728; Referee: Aaron Bannister
Note: Fixture was originally scheduled for a 15:00 kick-off, but was rescheduled for live Sky Sports broadcasting.

19 December 2025 21	Crewe Alexandra	1–1	Bristol Rovers	Crewe
19:45 GMT	Tezgel 9'; Thibaut (red card) 30'; Connolly (yellow card) 50'; Sanders (yellow card) 60'	Report	Morton 12'; Mola (yellow card) 30'; Sparkes (yellow card) 36'; Southwood (yellow card) 60'	Stadium: Gresty Road; Attendance: 9,125; Referee: Michael Barlow
Note: Fixture was initially scheduled for 20 December, but was brought forward a day to help with the Christmas scheduling.

26 December 2025 22	Bristol Rovers	2–3	Bromley	Bristol
15:00 GMT	Forde (yellow card) 12' (yellow-red card) 53'; Sparkes 34'; Cavegn 40' (yellow card) 90+4'; Cotterill (yellow card) 46'	Report	Kabamba 68' (yellow card) 70'; Thompson 81', 90+2'	Stadium: Memorial Stadium; Attendance: 8,127; Referee: Jacob Miles

29 December 2025 23	Bristol Rovers	0–2	Barnet	Bristol
19:45 GMT	Mola (yellow card) 43'; Sparkes (yellow card) 57'; Kilgour (yellow card) 87'	Report	Winterburn (yellow card) 40'; Senior 45'; Ofoborh (yellow card) 63'; Glover 86'	Stadium: Memorial Stadium; Attendance: 8,335; Referee: Declan Bourne

1 January 2026 24	Shrewsbury Town	0–3	Bristol Rovers	Shrewsbury
15:00 GMT	Boyle (yellow card) 43'; England (yellow card) 67'	Report	Cavegn 63', 88', 90+3'; Moore (yellow card) 68'	Stadium: New Meadow; Attendance: 5,872; Referee: Robert Massey-Ellis

17 January 2026 27	Bristol Rovers	0–1	Colchester United	Bristol
15:00 GMT	Senior (yellow card) 28'; Kilgour (yellow card) 73'; Sparkes (yellow card) 89'; Lockyer (yellow card) 90+3'	Report	Hunt (yellow card) 61'; Edwards 85'; Mbick (yellow card) 90+8'	Stadium: Memorial Stadium; Attendance: 7,556; Referee: Ben Toner

24 January 2026 28	Salford City	1–0	Bristol Rovers	Kersal
15:00 GMT	Graydon 8'; Garbutt (yellow card) 29'; Mnoga (yellow card) 43'	Report		Stadium: Moor Lane; Attendance: 3,034; Referee: Simon Mather

27 January 2026 29	Milton Keynes Dons	1–0	Bristol Rovers	Denbigh
19:45 GMT	Paterson (yellow card) 27' (goal) 45+7'; Offord (yellow card) 40'; Kelly (yellow card) 90'	Report	Harbottle (yellow card) 28'; Conteh (yellow card) 89'; Sparkes (yellow card) 90'	Stadium: Stadium MK; Attendance: 6,503; Referee: Craig Hicks

31 January 2026 30	Bristol Rovers	3–0	Newport County	Bristol
12:30 GMT	Akhamrich 10', 29'; Sparkes (yellow card) 61'; Cavegn 88'	Report	Glennon (yellow card) 33'; Biggins (yellow card) 57'	Stadium: Memorial Stadium; Attendance: 8,591; Referee: Will Finnie
Note: Fixture was initially scheduled for a 15:00 kick-off, but was rescheduled for live Sky Sports broadcasting.

3 February 2026 26	Bristol Rovers	2–0	Walsall	Bristol
19:45 GMT	Sparkes (yellow card) 43'; Akhamrich 61'; Balmer 64'	Report	Pattison (yellow card) 59'	Stadium: Memorial Stadium; Attendance: 6,291; Referee: Alex Chilowicz
Note: Fixture was originally scheduled for 10 January, but was rearranged due to Walsall's FA Cup progression.

7 February 2026 31	Bristol Rovers	2–3	Chesterfield	Bristol
15:00 GMT	Forde 28', 58' (yellow card) 90+6'; Mola (yellow card) 43'; Kilgour (yellow card) 75'	Report	Naylor 3', 61'; Bonis (yellow card) 48'; Berry 78'; Markanday (yellow card) 85'	Stadium: Memorial Stadium; Attendance: 8,210; Referee: Matthew Russell

14 February 2026 32	Cambridge United	3–1	Bristol Rovers	Cambridge
15:00 GMT	Knight 33', 56' (pne.); Purrington (yellow card) 44'; Watts 79'	Report	Quigley 45+3' (pen.); Sparkes (yellow card) 59'; Harrison (yellow card) 72'; Kilgour (yellow card) 84'; Omochere (yellow card) 90+5'	Stadium: Abbey Stadium; Attendance: 6,424; Referee: Thomas Parsons

17 February 2026 33	Oldham Athletic	2–0	Bristol Rovers	Oldham
19:45 GMT	Drummond 1' (yellow card) 28'; Pett (yellow card) 30'; Kavanagh (yellow card) 37'; Fondop 59'	Report	Thompson-Sommers (yellow card) 18'; Lockyer (yellow card) 28'; Kilgour (yellow card) 47'; Thomas (yellow card) 68'	Stadium: Boundary Park; Attendance: 6,256; Referee: Scott Oldham

21 February 2026 34	Bristol Rovers	3–1	Grimsby Town	Bristol
15:00 GMT	Balmer 2'; Quigley 7'; Mola (yellow card) 45+1'; Harrison (yellow card) 51'; Akhamrich 63'; Smallwood (yellow card) 71'	Report	Cook 38'	Stadium: Memorial Stadium; Attendance: 7,719; Referee: Ollie Yates

28 February 2026 35	Swindon Town	1–1	Bristol Rovers	Swindon
12:30 GMT	Clarke (yellow card) 32'; Palmer 58'	Report	Balmer (yellow card) 32'; Thompson-Sommers 43'; Senior (yellow card) 83'; Quigley (yellow card) 88'; Smallwood (yellow card) 90'	Stadium: County Ground; Attendance: 12,383; Referee: Ruebyn Ricardo
Note: Fixture was initially scheduled for a 15:00 kick-off, but was rescheduled to an earlier time.

7 March 2026 36	Bristol Rovers	2–1	Crewe Alexandra	Bristol
15:00 GMT	Harrison (yellow card) 33'; Leigh 87', 90+2'; Mola (yellow card) 90+6'; Balmer (yellow card) 90+6'	Report	Pond 17'; Billington (yellow card) 30'; Sanders (yellow card) 84'; Connolly (yellow card) 90+5'; Bogle (yellow card) 90+6'	Stadium: Memorial Stadium; Attendance: 7,924 (584 away); Referee: Edward Duckworth

10 March 2026 25	Barrow	0–2	Bristol Rovers	Barrow-in-Furness
19:45 GMT	MacDonald (yellow card) 64'	Report	Leigh 27'; Cavegn 56'	Stadium: Holker Street; Attendance: 2,300; Referee: Tom Reeves
Note: Fixture was originally scheduled for 4 January, but it was postponed due to a frozen pitch.

14 March 2026 37	Bromley	1–0	Bristol Rovers	Bromley
15:00 GMT	Hondermarck 18'; Pinnock (yellow card) 88'	Report	Forde (yellow card) 50' (yellow-red card) 81'	Stadium: Hayes Lane; Referee: Elliot Bell

17 March 2026 38	Bristol Rovers	1–0	Shrewsbury Town	Bristol
19:45 GMT	Harbottle (yellow card) 38'; Leigh 79'	Report		Stadium: Memorial Stadium; Attendance: 6,834; Referee: David Rock

21 March 2026 39	Gillingham	1–2	Bristol Rovers	Gillingham
15:00 GMT	Hale 16' (pen.); Waldock (yellow card) 35'; Hutton (yellow card) 71'; Little (yellow card) 89' (yellow-red card) 90+13'	Report	Leigh (yellow card) 34'; Kilgour (yellow card) 45' (goal) 46'; Harrison 72'; Young (yellow card) 90+10'	Stadium: Priestfield Stadium; Attendance: 5,764; Referee: Charles Breakspear

28 March 2026 40	Bristol Rovers	2–0	Accrington Stanley	Bristol
15:00 GMT	Harbottle 5', (yellow card) 49'; Sparkes 53'; Rijks (yellow card) 67'	Report	Matthews (yellow card) 52'; Sass (yellow card) 80'; Walton (yellow card) 83'	Stadium: Memorial Stadium; Attendance: 8,805 (155 away); Referee: Benjamin Speedie

3 April 2026 41	Bristol Rovers	1–0	Fleetwood Town	Bristol
15:00 BST	Balmer (yellow card) 40'; Quigley 66'; Young (yellow card) 69'; Forde (yellow card) 77'; Leigh (yellow card) 90'	Report	Rooney (yellow card) 26'; Neal (yellow card) 45+2'; Lynch (yellow card) 84'; Davies (yellow card) 90+6'	Stadium: Memorial Stadium; Attendance: 10,160; Referee: Darren Drysdale

6 April 2026 42	Harrogate Town	2–3	Bristol Rovers	Harrogate
15:00 BST	Taylor 27', 55'; Headman (yellow card) 75'	Report	Forde 50'; Harrison 61', 79' (pen.)	Stadium: Wetherby Road; Attendance: 3,610; Referee: Stephen Parkinson

11 April 2026 43	Bristol Rovers	3–1	Crawley Town	Bristol
12:30 BST	Harrison 26'; Rijks 30'; Harbottle (yellow card) 40'; Lockyer (red card) 88'; Akhamrich 90+6'; Leigh (yellow card) 90+8'	Report	Watson 80'; Lolos (yellow card) 90+8'	Stadium: Memorial Stadium; Attendance: 7,453; Referee: Scott Oldham
Note: Fixture was initially scheduled for a 15:00 kick-off, but was brought forward for live Sky Sports broadcasting.

18 April 2026 44	Tranmere Rovers	1–2	Bristol Rovers	Birkenhead
15:00 BST	Kenneh (yellow card) 12'; Finley (yellow card) 63'; Joseph 71'; Smith (yellow card) 75'; Dennis (yellow card) 90+1'	Report	Harbottle (yellow card) 34'; Balmer (yellow card) 63'; Omochere 65'; Akhamrich 84'; Young (yellow card) 90+2'	Stadium: Prenton Park; Attendance: 7,146; Referee: Carl Brook

25 April 2026 45	Bristol Rovers	4–0	Cheltenham Town	Horfield
15:00 BST	Harrison 2', 45+3', 56'; Smallwood (yellow card) 6'; Balmer (yellow card) 32'; Sparkes (yellow card) 55'; Leigh (yellow card) 71'; Forde 87'; Lockyer (yellow card) 90+1'	Report	Wilson (yellow card) 71'	Stadium: Memorial Stadium; Attendance: 11,126; Referee: Michael Barlow

2 May 2026 46	Notts County	1–1	Bristol Rovers	Nottingham
15:00 BST	Tsaroulla (yellow card) 10' (goal) 27'; Jatta (yellow card) 71'; Palmer (yellow card) 75'	Report	Forde (yellow card) 20'; Harrison 55'; Mola (yellow card) 65'; Akhamrich (yellow card) 77'	Stadium: Meadow Lane; Attendance: 16,264; Referee: Ross Joyce

=== FA Cup ===
Bristol Rovers were drawn away to Bromley in the first round and to Port Vale in the second round.

Win Draw Loss Fixtures

1 November 2025 First round	Bromley	1–2	Bristol Rovers	Bromley
15:00 GMT	Charles (yellow card) 54'; Umolu 83'	Report	Negru (yellow card) 37'; Cavegn 76' (yellow card) 78'; Cotterill 79'; Southwood (yellow card) 90+12'; Moore (yellow card) 90+14'	Stadium: Hayes Lane; Attendance: 2,500; Referee: Isaac Searle

6 December 2025 Second round	Port Vale	1–0	Bristol Rovers	Stoke-on-Trent
15:00 GMT	Hall (yellow card) 26'; Paton (yellow card) 26'; Waine 47'	Report	Lockyer (yellow card) 25'; Conteh (yellow card) 26'; Moore (yellow card) 83'	Stadium: Vale Park; Attendance: 3,227 (332 away); Referee: Ross Joyce

=== EFL Cup ===
Bristol Rovers were drawn at home to Cambridge United in the first round.

Win Draw Loss Fixtures

12 August 2025 First round	Bristol Rovers	0–2	Cambridge United	Bristol
19:45 BST	Conteh (yellow card) 23'	Report	Appéré 29'; Brophy (yellow card) 67'; Loft 75'	Stadium: Memorial Stadium; Attendance: 2,681 (154 away); Referee: Oliver Mackey

=== EFL Trophy ===
Bristol Rovers were drawn against Cheltenham Town, Plymouth Argyle and Tottenham Hotspur U21 in the group stage. After winning the group, they were then draw at home to Cambridge United in the round of 32. and to Plymouth Argyle in the round of 16.

Pos	Div	Team	Pld	W	PW	PL	L	GF	GA	GD	Pts	Qualification
1	L2	Bristol Rovers	3	2	1	0	0	6	4	+2	8	Advance to Round 2
2	L1	Plymouth Argyle	3	2	0	0	1	8	3	+5	6	Advance to Round 2
3	L2	Cheltenham Town	3	0	1	0	2	2	5	−3	2	
4	ACA	Tottenham Hotspur U21	3	0	0	2	1	8	12	−4	2	

Source: EFL

Win Draw Loss Fixtures

26 August 2025 South Group B	Bristol Rovers	4–4 (5–4 p)	Tottenham Hotspur U21	Bristol
19:00 BST	Howley (yellow card) 25'; Thomas (yellow card) 26'; Hutchinson (yellow card) 34' (goal) 69'; Harrison 45+2'; Cavegn 54', 73'	Report	Thompson 10', 58'; Williams-Barnett 14'; Akhamrich 16'; Olusesi (yellow card) 35'; Archer (red card) 65'; Byfield (yellow card) 76'; Maguire (yellow card) 84'	Stadium: Memorial Stadium; Attendance: 1,067; Referee: Stephen Parkinson
	Penalties
	Cavegn (penalty scored); Thomas (penalty scored); Hutchinson (penalty scored); Howley (penalty missed); Conteh (penalty scored); Dewsbury (penalty missed); Moore (penalty scored)		Russell-Denny (penalty missed); Lehane (penalty scored); Cassanova (penalty scored); Olusesi (penalty scored); Akhamrich (penalty scored); Logan (penalty missed); Rowswell (penalty missed)

7 October 2025 South Group B	Cheltenham Town	0–1	Bristol Rovers	Cheltenham
19:00 BST		Report	Thomas 60'; Sotiriou (yellow card) 78'	Stadium: Whaddon Road; Attendance: 1,713; Referee: Matthew Russell

11 November 2025 South Group B	Bristol Rovers	1–0	Plymouth Argyle	Bristol
19:00 GMT	Cavegn (yellow card) 83'; Conteh 90+4'	Report	Szűcs (red card) 2'; Ross (yellow card) 26'; Ashby-Hammond (yellow card) 61'; Mumba (yellow card) 79'	Stadium: Memorial Stadium; Attendance: 2,110 (697 away); Referee: Aaron Farmer

2 December 2025 Round of 32	Bristol Rovers	2–2	Cambridge United	Bristol
19:00 GMT	Harrison 9' (pen.), 18'; Chang (yellow card) 51'; Conteh (yellow card) 77'; Howley (yellow card) 84'; Mola (yellow card) 87'; Southwood (yellow card) 90+1'	Report	Hoddle (yellow card) 66'; Watts 68'; Kaikai 90+4' (pen.)	Stadium: Memorial Stadium; Attendance: 878 (100 away); Referee: James Durkin
	Penalties
	Cavegn (penalty scored); Sparkes (penalty scored); Thomas (penalty scored); Morton (penalty missed); Conteh (penalty scored)		Kaikai (penalty missed); Brophy (penalty scored); Munday (penalty missed); Ruddock Mpanzu (penalty scored)

13 January 2026 Round of 16	Bristol Rovers	3–4	Plymouth Argyle	Bristol
19:00 GMT	Forde 21'; Cavegn 39'; Thomas 61'; Hutchinson (yellow card) 62'; Balmer (yellow card) 89'; Lockyer (yellow card) 90+6'	Report	Watts 2'; Galloway 46', (yellow card) 90+1'; Tolaj 49'; Boateng (yellow card) 65'; Pepple 90+4'	Stadium: Memorial Stadium; Attendance: 2,548 (945 away); Referee: Andrew Humphries

== Statistics ==
Players with names in italics were on loan from another club for the whole of their season with Bristol Rovers.

=== Appearances and goals ===
As of match played 2 May 2026

Players with no appearances are not included on the list; italics indicate loaned in player

No.	Pos	Nat	Player	Total		League Two		FA Cup		EFL Cup		EFL Trophy	
No.	Pos	Nat	Player	Apps	Goals	Apps	Goals	Apps	Goals	Apps	Goals	Apps	Goals
1	GK	(Northern Ireland) NIR	Luke Southwood	27	0	22+0	0	2+0	0	1+0	0	2+0	0
2	DF	(England) ENG	Joel Senior	35	0	22+9	0	0+0	0	0+1	0	3+0	0
3	DF	(England) ENG	Jack Sparkes	47	2	39+3	2	0+0	0	1+0	0	3+1	0
4	DF	(England) ENG	Taylor Moore	26	0	9+9	0	1+1	0	0+1	0	4+1	0
5	DF	(England) ENG	Alfie Kilgour	38	1	35+1	1	0+0	0	1+0	0	1+0	0
6	DF	(England) ENG	Clinton Mola	39	0	31+1	0	2+0	0	1+0	0	4+0	0
7	FW	(England) ENG	Shaq Forde	28	5	19+5	4	1+1	0	0+0	0	1+1	1
8	MF	(England) ENG	Isaac Hutchinson	11	2	3+5	1	0+0	0	1+0	0	2+0	1
9	FW	(Republic of Ireland) IRL	Promise Omochere	15	2	12+3	2	0+0	0	0+0	0	0+0	0
10	MF	(Morocco) MAR	Yusuf Akhamrich	19	6	9+10	6	0+0	0	0+0	0	0+0	0
11	FW	(England) ENG	Luke Thomas	39	4	18+13	2	1+1	0	1+0	0	5+0	2
12	DF	(Wales) WAL	Tom Lockyer	19	0	10+6	0	2+0	0	0+0	0	1+0	0
13	GK	(England) ENG	Brad Young	27	0	24+0	0	0+0	0	0+0	0	3+0	0
14	MF	(England) ENG	Kane Thompson-Sommers	14	1	8+6	1	0+0	0	0+0	0	0+0	0
15	MF	(England) ENG	Ryan de Havilland	20	0	14+5	0	0+0	0	0+0	0	0+1	0
17	DF	(Northern Ireland) NIR	Kofi Balmer	23	2	21+1	2	0+0	0	0+0	0	0+1	0
19	FW	(Wales) WAL	Ellis Harrison	44	14	23+15	11	1+0	0	1+0	0	2+2	3
20	MF	(England) ENG	Josh McEachran	23	1	18+3	1	0+1	0	0+0	0	1+0	0
22	MF	(Sierra Leone) SLE	Kamil Conteh	34	2	20+6	1	1+1	0	1+0	0	3+2	1
23	DF	(Wales) WAL	Macauley Southam-Hales	18	1	13+2	1	1+0	0	1+0	0	1+0	0
24	MF	(England) ENG	Tommy Leigh	14	4	8+6	4	0+0	0	0+0	0	0+0	0
25	MF	(Wales) WAL	Ryan Howley	13	0	2+5	0	0+1	0	1+0	0	3+1	0
26	DF	(England) ENG	Riley Harbottle	15	1	15+0	1	0+0	0	0+0	0	0+0	0
27	FW	(England) ENG	Joe Quigley	17	3	10+7	3	0+0	0	0+0	0	0+0	0
29	FW	(Switzerland) SUI	Fabrizio Cavegn	51	15	33+10	11	2+0	1	0+1	0	2+3	3
35	FW	(Netherlands) NED	Mees Rijks	13	1	3+10	1	0+0	0	0+0	0	0+0	0
36	MF	(England) ENG	Richie Smallwood	15	0	13+2	0	0+0	0	0+0	0	0+0	0
43	FW	(Wales) WAL	Ollie Dewsbury	14	0	0+12	0	0+0	0	0+1	0	1+0	0
47	MF	(England) ENG	Kian Hill	1	0	0+0	0	0+0	0	0+0	0	0+1	0
48	DF	(England) ENG	Tom English	1	0	0+0	0	0+0	0	0+0	0	0+1	0
Players who featured but departed the club during the season:
10	FW	(Cyprus) CYP	Ruel Sotiriou	18	0	6+8	0	1+0	0	1+0	0	2+0	0
14	MF	(Wales) WAL	Joel Cotterill	16	1	10+3	0	2+0	1	0+0	0	1+0	0
15	DF	(England) ENG	Dan Ellison	2	0	0+0	0	0+0	0	0+0	0	1+1	0
24	MF	(England) ENG	Alfie Chang	19	0	14+2	0	1+0	0	0+0	0	1+1	0
27	DF	(England) ENG	Bryant Bilongo	15	0	3+6	0	2+0	0	0+1	0	3+0	0
28	DF	(Moldova) MDA	Stephan Negru	10	0	4+1	0	2+0	0	0+0	0	3+0	0
30	FW	(Wales) WAL	Freddie Issaka	9	0	0+7	0	0+1	0	0+0	0	1+0	0
35	DF	(Poland) POL	Kacper Łopata	17	0	14+0	0	0+2	0	0+0	0	1+0	0
39	FW	(England) ENG	Callum Morton	6	1	1+3	1	0+1	0	0+0	0	0+1	0

=== Goals Record ===
As of match played 2 May 2026

Rank	No.	Nat.	Po.	Name	League Two	FA Cup	EFL Cup	EFL Trophy	Total
1	29	(Switzerland)	CF	Fabrizio Cavegn	11	1	0	3	15
2	19	(Wales)	CF	Ellis Harrison	11	0	0	3	14
3	10	(Morocco)	RW	Yusuf Akhamrich	6	0	0	0	6
4	7	(England)	RW	Shaq Forde	4	0	0	1	5
5	11	(England)	AM	Luke Thomas	2	0	0	2	4
5	24	(England)	CAM	Tommy Leigh	4	0	0	0	4
7	27	(England)	CF	Joe Quigley	3	0	0	0	3
8	3	(England)	LB	Jack Sparkes	2	0	0	0	2
8	8	(England)	CM	Isaac Hutchinson	1	0	0	1	2
8	9	(Republic of Ireland)	CF	Promise Omochere	2	0	0	0	2
8	17	(England)	CB	Kofi Balmer	2	0	0	0	2
8	22	(Sierra Leone)	CM	Kamil Conteh	1	0	0	1	2
13	5	(England)	CB	Alfie Kilgour	1	0	0	0	1
13	14	(Wales)	CM	Joel Cotterill	0	1	0	0	1
13	14	(England)	CM	Kane Thompson-Sommers	1	0	0	0	1
13	20	(England)	CM	Josh McEachran	1	0	0	0	1
13	23	(Wales)	RB	Macauley Southam-Hales	1	0	0	0	1
13	26	(England)	CB	Riley Harbottle	1	0	0	0	1
13	35	(Netherlands)	CF	Mees Rijks	1	0	0	0	1
13	39	(England)	CF	Callum Morton	1	0	0	0	1
Total					56	2	0	11	69

=== Disciplinary record ===
As of match played 2 May 2026

Rank	No.	Nat.	Po.	Name	League Two			FA Cup			EFL Cup			EFL Trophy			Total		
Rank	No.	Nat.	Po.	Name	Yellow card	(yellow card) (yellow-red card)	Red card	Yellow card	(yellow card) (yellow-red card)	Red card	Yellow card	(yellow card) (yellow-red card)	Red card	Yellow card	(yellow card) (yellow-red card)	Red card	Yellow card	(yellow card) (yellow-red card)	Red card
1	3	(England)	LB	Jack Sparkes	11	0	1	0	0	0	0	0	0	0	0	0	11	0	1
2	6	(England)	CB	Clinton Mola	10	0	0	0	0	0	0	0	0	1	0	0	11	0	0
3	5	(England)	CB	Alfie Kilgour	8	0	0	0	0	0	0	0	0	0	0	0	8	0	0
3	7	(England)	RW	Shaq Forde	5	2	0	0	0	0	0	0	0	0	0	0	5	2	0
5	12	(Wales)	CB	Tom Lockyer	3	0	1	1	0	0	0	0	0	1	0	0	6	0	1
5	19	(Wales)	CF	Ellis Harrison	7	0	0	0	0	0	0	0	0	0	0	0	7	0	0
7	17	(Northern Ireland)	CB	Kofi Balmer	5	0	0	0	0	0	0	0	0	1	0	0	6	0	0
7	35	(Poland)	CB	Kacper Łopata	3	0	1	0	0	0	0	0	0	0	0	0	3	0	1
9	1	(Northern Ireland)	GK	Luke Southwood	3	0	0	1	0	0	0	0	0	1	0	0	5	0	0
9	2	(England)	RB	Joel Senior	2	0	1	0	0	0	0	0	0	0	0	0	2	0	1
9	11	(England)	RW	Luke Thomas	4	0	0	0	0	0	0	0	0	1	0	0	5	0	0
9	20	(England)	CM	Josh McEachran	5	0	0	0	0	0	0	0	0	0	0	0	5	0	0
9	22	(Sierra Leone)	CM	Kamil Conteh	2	0	0	1	0	0	1	0	0	1	0	0	5	0	0
9	26	(England)	CB	Riley Harbottle	5	0	0	0	0	0	0	0	0	0	0	0	5	0	0
15	10	(Cyprus)	CF	Ruel Sotiriou	3	0	0	0	0	0	0	0	0	1	0	0	4	0	0
15	23	(Wales)	RB	Macauley Southam-Hales	4	0	0	0	0	0	0	0	0	0	0	0	4	0	0
15	24	(England)	AM	Tommy Leigh	4	0	0	0	0	0	0	0	0	0	0	0	4	0	0
18	4	(England)	CB	Taylor Moore	1	0	0	2	0	0	0	0	0	0	0	0	3	0	0
18	8	(England)	CM	Isaac Hutchinson	1	0	0	0	0	0	0	0	0	2	0	0	3	0	0
18	9	(Republic of Ireland)	CF	Promise Omochere	3	0	0	0	0	0	0	0	0	0	0	0	3	0	0
18	13	(England)	GK	Brad Young	3	0	0	0	0	0	0	0	0	0	0	0	3	0	0
18	24	(England)	CM	Alfie Chang	2	0	0	0	0	0	0	0	0	1	0	0	3	0	0
18	29	(Switzerland)	CF	Fabrizio Cavegn	1	0	0	1	0	0	0	0	0	1	0	0	3	0	0
18	36	(England)	CM	Richie Smallwood	3	0	0	0	0	0	0	0	0	0	0	0	3	0	0
24	14	(Wales)	CM	Joel Cotterill	2	0	0	0	0	0	0	0	0	0	0	0	2	0	0
24	25	(Wales)	CM	Ryan Howley	0	0	0	0	0	0	0	0	0	2	0	0	2	0	0
26	10	(Morocco)	RW	Yusuf Akhamrich	1	0	0	0	0	0	0	0	0	0	0	0	1	0	0
26	14	(England)	CM	Kane Thompson-Sommers	1	0	0	0	0	0	0	0	0	0	0	0	1	0	0
26	27	(England)	LB	Bryant Bilongo	1	0	0	0	0	0	0	0	0	0	0	0	1	0	0
26	27	(England)	CF	Joe Quigley	1	0	0	0	0	0	0	0	0	0	0	0	1	0	0
26	28	(Moldova)	CB	Stephan Negru	0	0	0	1	0	0	0	0	0	0	0	0	1	0	0
26	35	(Netherlands)	CF	Mees Rijks	1	0	0	0	0	0	0	0	0	0	0	0	1	0	0
26	43	(Wales)	CF	Ollie Dewsbury	1	0	0	0	0	0	0	0	0	0	0	0	1	0	0
Total					108	2	4	7	0	0	1	0	0	13	0	0	129	2	4

== Monthly awards ==
Month	Player of the Month	Reference
August	(England) Alfie Kilgour	
September	(Switzerland) Fabrizio Cavegn	
October	Not awarded	
November	Not awarded	
December	Not awarded	
January	Not awarded	
February	(Morocco) Yusuf Akhamrich	
March	(England) Tommy Leigh	
April	(Wales) Ellis Harrison	
