= Kofi Balmer =

Northern Irish footballer (born 2000)

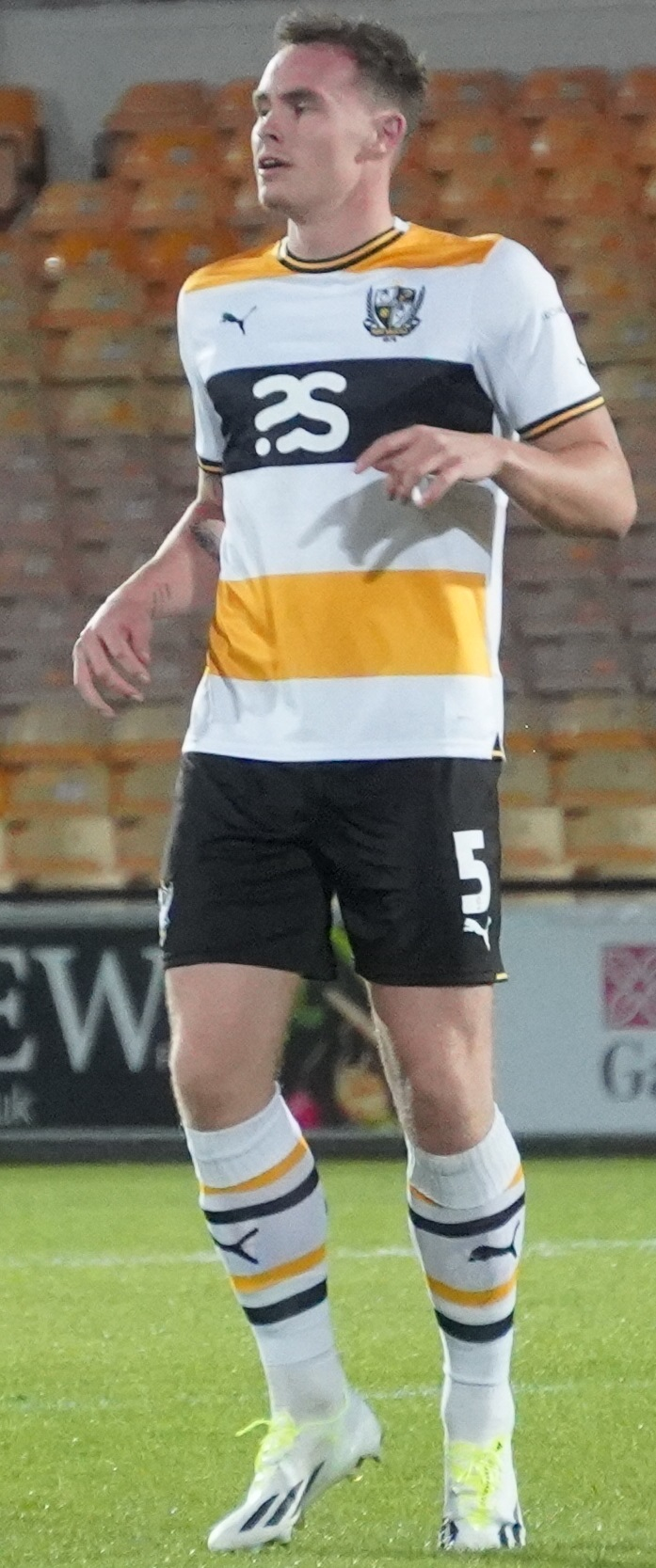
- Balmer with Port Vale in 2023

Personal information
- Full name: Kofi Balmer
- Date of birth: 19 September 2000 (age 26)
- Place of birth: Newtownabbey, Northern Ireland
- Height: 1.83 m (6 ft 0 in)
- Position: Centre-back

Team information
- Current team: Bristol Rovers
- Number: 4

Youth career
- Ballymena United

Senior career*
Years	Team	Apps	(Gls)
2016–2021	Ballymena United	80	(8)
2021–2022	Larne	35	(3)
2022–2024	Crystal Palace	0	(0)
2023–2024	→ Port Vale (loan)	11	(0)
2024	→ AFC Wimbledon (loan)	17	(1)
2024–2026	Motherwell	25	(0)
2026	→ Bristol Rovers (loan)	22	(2)
2026–	Bristol Rovers	15	(0)

International career
2018	Northern Ireland U19	5	(0)
2019–2022	Northern Ireland U21	20	(0)
- * Club domestic league appearances and goals as of 18:30, 21 November 2026

Kofi Balmer (born 19 September 2000) is a Northern Irish professional footballer who plays as a centre-back for EFL League Two club Bristol Rovers. He has won caps for Northern Ireland up to under-21 level.

Balmer made his debut in the NIFL Premiership with Ballymena United in April 2017, aged only 16. He spent just over four seasons with the club, playing on the losing side in the 2018 County Antrim Shield, 2018 Northern Ireland Football League Cup, and 2020 Irish Cup finals. He was named Ulster Young Footballer of the Year for the 2018–19 season. Upon joining Larne in 2021, he turned professional and would win the County Antrim Shield the following year. He was sold to Crystal Palace in August 2022, from where he was loaned out to Port Vale for the first half of the 2023–24 season and AFC Wimbledon for the second half. He signed with Scottish club Motherwell in June 2024 and returned to England at Bristol Rovers, initially on loan, in January 2026.

== Early life ==
Kofi Balmer was born on 19 September 2000 in Newtownabbey. His parents named him Kofi – a name traditionally given to a child born on a Friday by the Akan people – reportedly after Kofi Annan, the Secretary-General of the United Nations. However, the family had no Ghanaian lineage, and he was born on a Tuesday.

== Club career ==
=== Ballymena United ===
Balmer scored on his NIFL Premiership debut for Ballymena United on 29 April 2017, aged only 16, securing a 1–1 draw at Coleraine. Manager David Jeffrey described him as "an old head on young shoulders". He played 27 matches in the 2017–18 season, and also featured in the County Antrim Shield defeat to Crusaders and in the Northern Ireland Football League Cup final defeat to Dungannon Swifts. He was named as Ulster Young Footballer of the Year in after featuring 28 times in the 2018–19 campaign. He played 24 games in the 2019–20 season, including four appearances in the qualifying rounds of the UEFA Europa League. He also played in the 2020 Irish Cup defeat to Glentoran at Windsor Park. A key member of the team who delivered decisive performances on a regular basis, he scored four goals in 16 games in the 2020–21 league campaign.

=== Larne ===
Balmer joined Irish Premiership rivals Larne to become a full-time professional. During the 2021–22 season, he played 35 league games, and also played in four UEFA Europa Conference League qualifying matches, where Larne made it to the third round where they were knocked out by Portuguese Primeira Liga side Paços de Ferreira despite winning 1–0 at Inver Park. Larne also won the County Antrim Shield, beating league champions Linfield in the final; Balmer played in the 1–0 victory on 11 January, despite having to face his father's death the previous week. He signed a contract extension the following month.

=== Crystal Palace ===
On 11 August 2022, Balmer was signed to Crystal Palace for an undisclosed fee. Manager Patrick Vieira named him on the bench for three Premier League games in October 2022. He featured 33 times for the under-21 side, including in the side's run to the Premier League International Cup final. On 15 July 2023, he joined League One side Port Vale on loan for the 2023–24 season, having already played for manager Andy Crosby in his international career. He tore his hamstring in a 1–0 defeat to Peterborough United at Vale Park on 24 October, which saw him ruled out of action for six weeks. He was recalled to Crystal Palace on 16 January 2024, having played 16 games for the Valiants.

On 31 January 2024, Balmer joined League Two club AFC Wimbledon on loan for the remainder of the 2023–24 season, having been recommended to the club by former Vale teammate Ethan Chislett. Manager Johnnie Jackson said that "he will play a key role in helping us to kick-on in the second half of the season". He scored his first goal in the English Football League in a 2–0 win at Notts County on 9 March. He was reported to be a summer transfer target for St Mirren.

=== Motherwell ===
On 11 June 2024, Balmer agreed on a two-year deal with Scottish Premiership club Motherwell, with the option of a further year. He scored on his debut for the "Steelmen" in the Scottish League Cup the following month, though had to wait until the end of September for his Premiership debut when he entered the pitch as a substitute following a red card to Dan Casey. He was sent off in a 2–0 defeat at Kilmarnock on 5 April. However, his red card was overturned on appeal after manager Michael Wimmer saw the sending off as a refereeing error.

In August 2025, he was the subject of transfer interest from Danish club Kolding IF after being dropped by new Motherwell manager Jens Berthel Askou. He played five league games in the first half of the 2025–26 campaign, not featuring after 27 September.

=== Bristol Rovers ===
On 12 January 2026, Balmer joined League Two club Bristol Rovers on loan for the remainder of the 2025–26 season. Manager Steve Evans said that "he spoke of having lots to prove and I love kids who have that desire when they come here". On 3 February, he scored his first goal for the club, volleying home from the edge of the penalty area as Rovers beat Walsall 2–0 to move further away from the relegation zone, a strike later voted as the club's goal of the season. Following the match, he claimed that he had "never hit a ball that well in [his] life". He helped the team to go on an eight-game winning run as the season drew to a close. Motherwell released Balmer upon the expiry of his contract, and Steve Evans said he was confident of bringing Balmer back to Bristol Rovers.

On 8 June 2026, Bristol Rovers announced that Balmer had agreed to return to the club on a permanent two-year deal.

== International career ==
Balmer is a youth international for Northern Ireland, having played with the under-19s and under-21s, captaining both sides.

Balmer was first called to the Northern Ireland senior team by Ian Baraclough in September 2022. He was called up by Michael O'Neill in August 2025.

== Style of play ==
Playing mainly as a centre-back, Balmer is also able to play on both sides, as a full-back or a wing-back. According to Patrick Vieira, Balmer is good on the ball and cool under pressure, with good leadership skills.

== Career statistics ==
As of match played 21 November 2026

Appearances and goals by club, season and competition
Club	Season	League			National cup (Note: Includes Irish Cup, FA Cup, Scottish Cup)		League cup (Note: Includes Northern Ireland Football League Cup, Football League Cup, Scottish League Cup)		Other		Total	
Club	Season	Division	Apps	Goals	Apps	Goals	Apps	Goals	Apps	Goals	Apps	Goals
Ballymena United	2016–17	NIFL Premiership	1	1	0	0	0	0	0	0	1	1
Ballymena United	2017–18	NIFL Premiership	23	2	1	0	3	0	0	0	27	2
Ballymena United	2018–19	NIFL Premiership	24	1	1	0	3	0	0	0	28	1
Ballymena United	2019–20	NIFL Premiership	16	0	2	0	1	0	5 (Note: 1 appearance in Scottish Challenge Cup and 4 appearances in the UEFA Europa League)	0	24	0
Ballymena United	2020–21	NIFL Premiership	16	4	3	0	0	0	0	0	19	4
Ballymena United	Total		80	8	7	0	7	0	5	0	99	8
Larne	2021–22	NIFL Premiership	35	3	2	0	0	0	4 (Note: Appearance(s) in UEFA Europa Conference League)	0	41	3
Larne	2022–23	NIFL Premiership	0	0	0	0	0	0	2	0	2	0
Larne	Total		35	3	2	0	0	0	6	0	43	3
Crystal Palace	2022–23	Premier League	0	0	0	0	0	0	—		0	0
Crystal Palace	2023–24	Premier League	0	0	0	0	0	0	—		0	0
Crystal Palace	Total		0	0	0	0	0	0	0	0	0	0
Crystal Palace U21	2022–23	—			—		—		2 (Note: Appearance(s) in EFL Trophy)	0	2	0
Port Vale (loan)	2023–24	League One	11	0	0	0	2	0	3	0	16	0
AFC Wimbledon (loan)	2023–24	League Two	17	1	—		—		0	0	17	1
Motherwell	2024–25	Scottish Premiership	20	0	1	0	2	1	—		23	1
Motherwell	2025–26	Scottish Premiership	5	0	0	0	3	0	—		8	0
Motherwell	Total		25	0	1	0	5	1	0	0	31	1
Bristol Rovers (loan)	2025–26	League Two	22	2	—		—		1	0	23	2
Bristol Rovers	2026–27	League Two	15	0	1	0	1	0	0	0	17	0
Bristol Rovers	Total		37	2	1	0	1	0	1	0	40	2
Career total			205	14	11	0	15	1	17	0	248	15

== Honours ==
Ballymena United

- County Antrim Shield runner-up: 2018
- Northern Ireland Football League Cup runner-up: 2018
- Irish Cup runner-up: 2020

Larne

- County Antrim Shield: 2022

Individual

- Ulster Young Footballer of the Year: 2018–19
