= Brad Young (footballer, born 2002) =

English football player

Personal information
- Full name: Bradley Ray Young
- Date of birth: 5 May 2002 (age 24)
- Place of birth: Murton, England
- Height: 6 ft 3 in (1.91 m)
- Position: Goalkeeper

Team information
- Current team: Bristol Rovers
- Number: 1

Youth career
- 2017–2019: Hartlepool United

Senior career*
Years	Team	Apps	(Gls)
2019–2021	Hartlepool United	0	(0)
2019–2020	→ Billingham Town (loan)	30	(0)
2020–2021	→ Blyth Spartans (loan)	8	(0)
2021–2025	Leicester City	0	(0)
2022–2023	→ Notts County (loan)	0	(0)
2024–2025	→ Hartlepool United (loan)	10	(0)
2025–	Bristol Rovers	40	(0)
- * Club domestic league appearances and goals as of 18:35, 21 November 2026 (UTC)

Bradley Ray Young (born 5 May 2002) is a professional footballer who plays as a goalkeeper for EFL League Two club Bristol Rovers.

== Club career ==
=== Hartlepool United ===
In 2019, Young signed his first professional contract with National League side Hartlepool United. In the same season, he joined Northern League Division One side Billingham Town on a season long loan deal.

On 16 October 2020, Young signed for National League North club Blyth Spartans on a season long loan. Upon signing, Blyth manager Michael Nelson said "Pools rate him highly and see him as a future number one, so hopefully he can develop with us and do well." Due to the National League North season ending early due to the coronavirus pandemic, he was recalled by Hartlepool in February 2021. Young made eight appearances in total for Blyth.

=== Leicester City ===
In July 2021, Young signed for Premier League side Leicester City for an undisclosed fee.

On 26 August 2022, Brad signed on loan for National League side Notts County for the entirety of the 2022–23 season. However, due to a knee injury, he was recalled by Leicester in January 2023. Young made two appearances for The Magpies – both in cup competitions, one in the FA Cup and the other in the FA Trophy.

In August 2024, Young moved on loan to Hartlepool – the club he began his career with. He made 12 appearances in all competitions for Pools before being recalled to Leicester in February 2025.

At the end of the 2024–25 season, Young was released by Leicester.

=== Bristol Rovers ===
On 26 June 2025, it was announced that Young had signed a two-year deal with League Two side Bristol Rovers. On 27 August 2025, he made his first appearance for The Gas in an EFL Trophy game against Tottenham Hotspur U21s – the game finished 4–4 and Young saved two penalties in the shootout which Rovers won 5–4. Having been second-choice goalkeeper across the first-half of the season, he replaced Luke Southwood in January 2026, although manager Steve Evans confirmed that further competition would be brought into the club. With no further goalkeeping options having been brought into the club, he remained as the club's number one for the remainder of the season. On 1 June 2026, he signed a new four-year contract with the club.

== International career ==
In March 2019, Young was called up to an England U19 training camp and would later go on to represent England at that level.

== Personal life ==
Young attended Easington Academy.

== Career statistics ==
As of match played 21 November 2026

Appearances and goals by club, season and competition
Club	Season	League			FA Cup		League Cup		Other		Total	
Club	Season	Division	Apps	Goals	Apps	Goals	Apps	Goals	Apps	Goals	Apps	Goals
Leicester City U21	2023–24	—			—		—		3 (Note: Appearance(s) in EFL Trophy)	0	3	0
Leicester City U21	2024–25	—			—		—		1	0	1	0
Leicester City U21	Total				—		—		4	0	4	0
Hartlepool United (loan)	2024–25	National League	10	0	2	0	—		0	0	12	0
Bristol Rovers	2025–26	League Two	24	0	0	0	0	0	3	0	27	0
Bristol Rovers	2026–27	League Two	16	0	1	0	1	0	0	0	18	0
Bristol Rovers	Total		40	0	1	0	1	0	3	0	45	0
Career total			50	0	3	0	1	0	7	0	61	0
