= Ryan Howley =

Welsh footballer (born 2003)

Personal information
- Full name: Ryan Oliver Howley
- Date of birth: 23 November 2003 (age 22)
- Place of birth: Nuneaton, England
- Height: 1.88 m (6 ft 2 in)
- Position: Midfielder

Team information
- Current team: Tamworth (on loan from Bristol Rovers)
- Number: 25

Youth career
- 2009–2021: Coventry City

Senior career*
Years	Team	Apps	(Gls)
2021–2025	Coventry City	5	(0)
2023–2024	→ Dundee (loan)	13	(0)
2024–2025	→ Ayr United (loan)	10	(0)
2025–	Bristol Rovers	7	(0)
2026	→ Tamworth (loan)	7	(0)
2026–	→ Tamworth (loan)	0	(0)

International career^{‡}
2021	Wales U19	2	(0)
2022	Wales U21	1	(0)
- * Club domestic league appearances and goals as of 22:00, 9 September 2026 (UTC) ‡ National team caps and goals as of 22:00, 6 February 2026 (UTC)

Ryan Oliver Howley (born 23 November 2003) is a professional footballer who plays as a midfielder for Tamworth, on loan from EFL League Two club Bristol Rovers. He is a former Wales under-21 international.

== Career ==
=== Coventry City ===
A youth product of the Coventry City since the age of 6, Howley signed his first professional contract with the club on 24 November 2020. He made his professional debut for Coventry in a 2–1 EFL Cup loss to Northampton Town on 11 August 2021. On 24 April 2022, Howley won the EFL Championship Apprentice of the Season for the 2021–22 season.

==== Dundee (loan) ====
On 28 August 2023, Howley joined Scottish Premiership club Dundee on a season-long loan deal. He made his debut as a substitute in a league game away to St Johnstone. Howley made 14 total appearances for Dundee before returning to Coventry at the end of his loan spell.

==== Ayr United (loan) ====
On 28 August 2024, Howley joined Scottish Championship club Ayr United on a season-long loan. He made his debut for the Honest Men on 31 August off the bench in a league draw away to Dunfermline Athletic.

==== Return to Coventry City ====
In January 2025, Howley was recalled by Coventry and ended his loan spell with Ayr.

On 28 May 2025, Coventry City announced that Howley had been released.

=== Bristol Rovers ===
On 8 July 2025, following a successful trial period, Howley joined League Two club Bristol Rovers on a two-year deal.

==== Tamworth (loan) ====
On 6 February 2026 it was confirmed that Howley had signed for National League side Tamworth on loan for the remainder of the 2025–26 season, he was joined at the club on the same day by Birmingham City player Daniel Isichei.

==== Second Tamworth (loan) ====
On 4 September 2026, he returned to Tamworth on a three-month loan deal. Howley made his second debut for Tamworth on 9 September 2026, coming on as a 46th minute substitute for Joe Rye in a National League Cup fixture at home to Middlesbrough. Tamworth lost the fixture 3–1.

== International career ==
Howley made his international debut for Wales U19 in a friendly against Croatia U19, playing 45 minutes.

In September 2022 Howley was called up to the Wales under-21 squad., he made his debut for the U21s in the friendly defeat to Austria U21, on 27 September 2022, coming on to replace Oliver Hammond for the final eight minutes.

== Career statistics ==
As of 9 September 2026

Appearances and goals by club, season and competition
Club	Season	League			National Cup		League Cup		Other		Total	
Club	Season	Division	Apps	Goals	Apps	Goals	Apps	Goals	Apps	Goals	Apps	Goals
Coventry City	2021–22	Championship	1	0	0	0	1	0	—		2	0
Coventry City	2022–23	Championship	4	0	0	0	1	0	—		5	0
Coventry City	2023–24	Championship	0	0	0	0	1	0	—		1	0
Coventry City	2024–25	Championship	0	0	0	0	0	0	—		0	0
Coventry City	Total		5	0	0	0	3	0	0	0	8	0
Dundee (loan)	2023–24	Scottish Premiership	13	0	1	0	—		0	0	14	0
Ayr United (loan)	2024–25	Scottish Championship	10	0	0	0	—		3	0	13	0
Bristol Rovers	2025–26	League Two	7	0	1	0	1	0	4 (Note: Appearances in EFL Trophy)	0	13	0
Bristol Rovers	2026–27	League Two	0	0	0	0	0	0	1	0	1	0
Bristol Rovers	Total		7	0	1	0	1	0	5	0	14	0
Tamworth (loan)	2025–26	National League	7	0	0	0	—		0	0	7	0
Tamworth (loan)	2026–27	National League	0	0	0	0	—		1 (Note: One appearance in National League Cup)	0	1	0
Total			42	0	2	0	4	0	10	0	58	0

== Honours ==
Individual

- EFL Championship Apprentice of the Season: 2021–22
