= Kacper Łopata =

Polish footballer

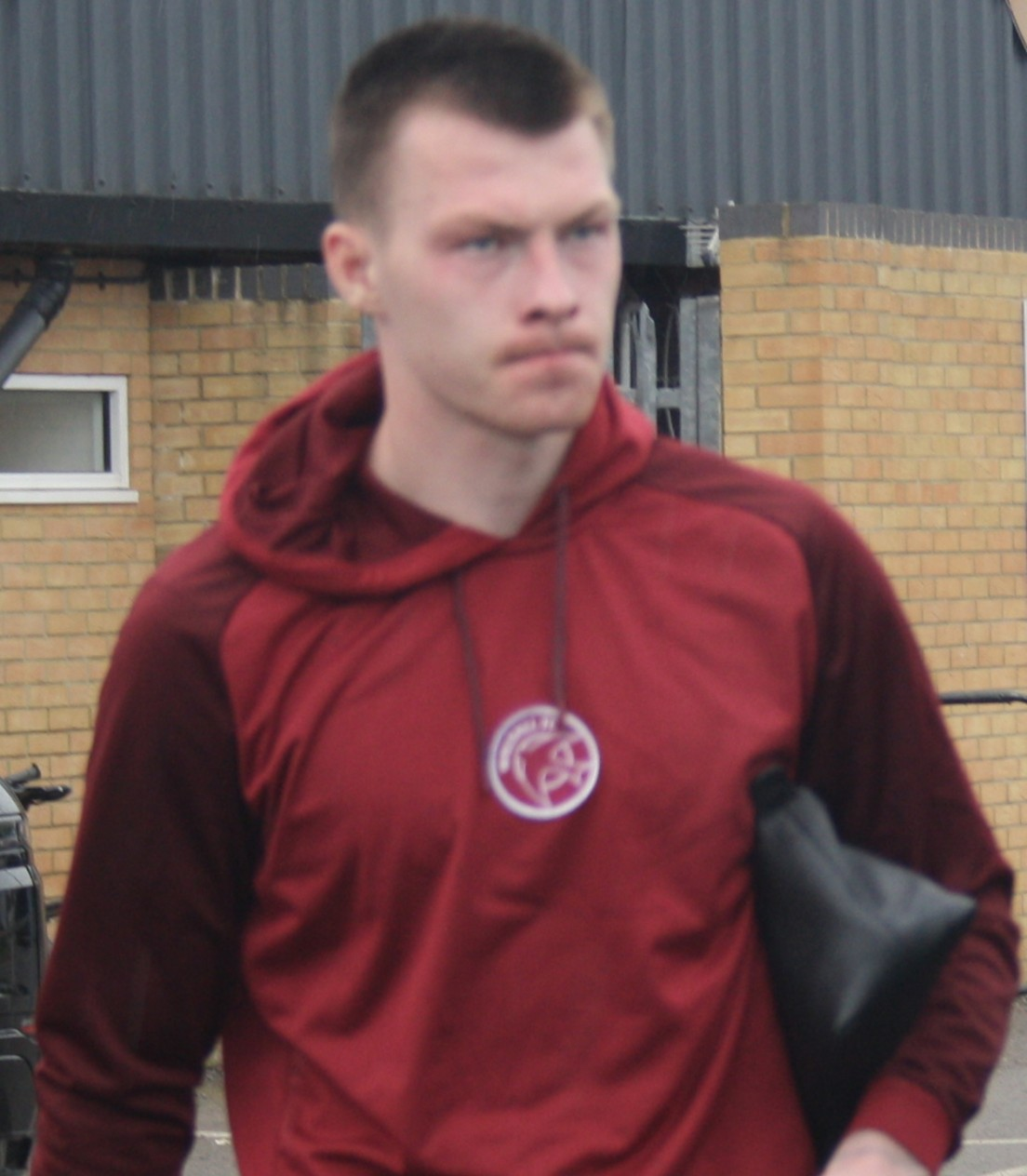
- Łopata in 2026

Personal information
- Full name: Kacper Mieczysław Łopata
- Date of birth: 27 August 2001 (age 25)
- Place of birth: Kraków, Poland
- Height: 1.92 m (6 ft 4 in)
- Position: Centre-back

Team information
- Current team: Lechia Gdańsk
- Number: 4

Youth career
- 2012–2013: St Vallier City
- 2013–201?: Southampton
- 201?–2016: Bristol City
- 2016–2017: Yeovil Town
- 2018: Bristol City
- 2018: Brighton & Hove Albion

Senior career*
Years	Team	Apps	(Gls)
2018–2020	Brighton & Hove Albion	0	(0)
2019–2020	→ Whitehawk (loan)	15	(3)
2020	→ Zagłębie Sosnowiec (loan)	7	(0)
2020–2022	Sheffield United	0	(0)
2021–2022	→ Southend United (loan)	17	(0)
2022–2023	Southend United	22	(1)
2023	Woking	4	(0)
2023–2026	Barnsley	13	(0)
2024	→ Port Vale (loan)	6	(0)
2024–2025	→ Ross County (loan)	30	(0)
2025–2026	→ Bristol Rovers (loan)	14	(0)
2026	→ Walsall (loan)	9	(0)
2026–	Lechia Gdańsk	0	(0)

International career
2019	Poland U18	1	(0)
2019	Poland U19	2	(0)
2021–2022	Poland U20	6	(0)
2022	Poland U21	1	(1)
- * Club domestic league appearances and goals as of 00:23, 5 May 2026 (UTC)

Kacper Mieczysław Łopata (Polish pronunciation: [ˈkat͡spɛr mʲɛˈt͡ʂɨswaf wɔˈpata]; born 27 August 2001) is a Polish professional footballer who plays as a centre-back for I liga club Lechia Gdańsk.

Łopata moved from Poland to England at the age of nine and spent his junior years with a variety of football clubs before he made his senior debut in non-League football at Whitehawk, on loan from Brighton & Hove Albion in the 2019–20 season. He was later loaned out to Polish I liga side Zagłębie Sosnowiec, though he was released from Brighton and ended up signing for Sheffield United. He joined Southend United on loan in October 2021 and joined the club permanently in September 2022. He left Southend amidst a wage dispute in March 2023 and ended the 2022–23 season with Woking. He signed with Barnsley in June 2023 and was loaned to Port Vale for the second half of the 2023–24 campaign. He was loaned to Scottish club Ross County for the 2024–25 season, and to Bristol Rovers and Walsall for the 2025–26 campaign. He returned to Poland to join Lechia Gdańsk in August 2026.

== Early life ==
Kacper Mieczysław Łopata was born in Kraków on 27 August 2001. He grew up in Szczecin before he moved to Bristol with his mother at the age of nine. He attended South Gloucestershire and Stroud College (SGS), where the head of football Dave Hockaday became his sporting mentor, helping to steer him towards playing football rather than handball. He played for the junior teams of St Vallier City, Southampton, Bristol City, Yeovil Town and Brighton & Hove Albion.

== Club career ==
=== Brighton Hove & Albion ===
In October 2018, Łopata signed a two-year contract with Premier League side Brighton & Hove Albion, choosing them ahead of Bristol City. He helped to mark Mason Greenwood out of a game against Manchester United in the FA Youth Cup, with the assistance of teammate Haydon Roberts. In August 2019, he joined Whitehawk on loan. He scored within four minutes of his debut against VCD Athletic, though also gave away a penalty kick and was booked for swearing at the referee. He went on to make 19 appearances in all competitions for the Isthmian League South East Division side, scoring five goals and impressing manager Jude McDonald with his attitude. In January 2020, following a meeting with manager Dariusz Dudek, Łopata joined Polish I liga side Zagłębie Sosnowiec on loan until the end of the 2019–20 season. On 29 February, he made his professional debut in a 2–0 win over Miedź Legnica. He was released by Brighton at the end of the 2019–20 season.

=== Sheffield United ===
On 25 August 2020, Łopata joined Sheffield United on a three-year contract, where manager Chris Wilder got him to train with the first-team rather than the Academy. On 10 August 2021, Slavisa Jokanovic handed him his debut at Bramall Lane and he went on to play the full match in a 1–0 win over Carlisle United in the EFL Cup. On 28 October, he was loaned to National League side Southend United, initially until January 2022, along with fellow Sheffield United player Zak Brunt. He featured 18 times, keeping four clean sheets, helping Kevin Maher's side to go on a 14-game unbeaten league run. Faced with injuries, the Blades recalled Łopata on 12 March 2022. Sheffield United rejected a transfer bid from a Polish club but allowed him a permanent transfer to Southend to find first-team football as manager Paul Heckingbottom said "it became clear he didn't want to be here anymore".

=== Southend United ===
On 2 September 2022, Łopata joined Southend United permanently for an undisclosed fee, signing a two-year deal with an option for another year. He made an immediate impact at Roots Hall as Southend went nine league games unbeaten, keeping seven clean sheets. He scored his first goal for the club in a 3–0 win at Barnet. In March 2023, he terminated his contract with the club, apparently unhappy at how players had been treated over unpaid wages, a decision supported by The Football Association's Contract Disputes Tribunal.

=== Woking ===
On 27 March 2023, Łopata joined Woking on a contract until the end of the 2022–23 season. Following five appearances for Darren Sarll's Cardinals, including a National League play-off quarter-final defeat to Bromley at the Kingfield Stadium, Łopata announced he would be leaving the club at the end of his contract in June via his Instagram account.

=== Barnsley ===
On 6 June 2023, Łopata signed a four-year contract with League One club Barnsley. He made his debut at Oakwell in a 7–0 win over Port Vale on 5 August. Bobby Hassell, the club's interim director of football, noted that he "started the season in brilliant form and integrated smoothly into the squad". However, a clavicle fracture saw him lose his place in Neill Collins's team and he found stiff competition for defensive places upon his return to fitness.

On 1 February 2024, Łopata joined Port Vale on loan for the remainder of the 2023–24 season. Manager Andy Crosby and director of football David Flitcroft said that he would strengthen the club's defensive options. He made his debut at Vale Park in a 1–0 defeat to Leyton Orient on 6 February, earning praise from interim manager Will Ryder for his performance. However, he could not gain a first-team place under new manager Darren Moore.

On 29 August 2024, Łopata joined Scottish Premiership club Ross County on loan for the 2024–25 season. He said he hoped the move would improve his chances of getting an international call-up. He featured 31 times in the campaign.

On 14 August 2025, Łopata joined League Two club Bristol Rovers on loan for the 2025–26 season. He said he had an attachment to the club after growing up near the Memorial Stadium. He had an unfortunate debut, however, as he was substituted at half-time in a defeat at Chesterfield as manager Darrell Clarke recorganised the team following a red card for right-back Joel Senior. On 6 January, he returned to Barnsley after his loan was ended early. He had made 17 appearances in all competitions for Rovers, and had been sent off in his penultimate appearance for a reckless challenge on Swindon Town's Gavin Kilkenny.

On 15 January 2026, he returned to League Two on loan at Walsall until the end of the 2025–26 season as head coach Mat Sadler looked to increase his defensive options. Sadler spoke out the following month to say that Łopata's presence had allowed him to shake up the team's defence.

=== Lechia Gdánsk ===
On 25 August 2026, Łopata returned to Poland to sign for I liga club Lechia Gdańsk for an undisclosed fee.

== International career ==
Łopata has represented Poland at under-18, under-19, under-20 and under-21 levels.

== Style of play ==
Łopata is a "no-nonsense" centre-back who focuses on organised defending. He describes himself as a "student of the game" who analyses training and match performances in his free time.

== Career statistics ==
As of match played 2 May 2026

Appearances and goals by club, season and competition
Club	Season	League			National cup (Note: Includes FA Cup, Polish Cup, Scottish Cup)		League cup (Note: Includes EFL Cup)		Other		Total	
Club	Season	Division	Apps	Goals	Apps	Goals	Apps	Goals	Apps	Goals	Apps	Goals
Brighton & Hove Albion	2019–20	Premier League	0	0	—		0	0	—		0	0
Whitehawk (loan)	2019–20	Isthmian League; South East Division	15	3	1	0	—		3 (Note: Appearance(s) in FA Trophy)	2	19	5
Zagłębie Sosnowiec (loan)	2019–20	I liga	7	0	0	0	—		—		7	0
Sheffield United	2020–21	Premier League	0	0	0	0	0	0	—		0	0
Sheffield United	2021–22	Championship	0	0	0	0	2	0	—		2	0
Sheffield United	Total		0	0	0	0	2	0	—		2	0
Southend United (loan)	2021–22	National League	17	0	1	0	—		0	0	18	0
Southend United	2022–23	National League	22	1	1	0	—		3	0	26	1
Southend United	Total		39	1	2	0	0	0	3	0	44	1
Woking	2022–23	National League	4	0	—		—		1 (Note: Appearances in National League play-offs)	0	5	0
Barnsley	2023–24	League One	13	0	0	0	1	0	1 (Note: Appearance(s) in EFL Trophy)	0	15	0
Barnsley	2024–25	League One	0	0	0	0	1	0	1	0	2	0
Barnsley	2025–26	League One	0	0	0	0	0	0	0	0	0	0
Barnsley	2026–27	League One	0	0	0	0	0	0	0	0	0	0
Barnsley	Total		13	0	0	0	2	0	2	0	17	0
Port Vale (loan)	2023–24	League One	6	0	—		—		—		6	0
Ross County (loan)	2024–25	Scottish Premiership	30	0	1	0	0	0	—		31	0
Bristol Rovers (loan)	2025–26	League Two	14	0	2	0	—		1	0	17	0
Walsall (loan)	2025–26	League Two	9	0	—		—		—		9	0
Lechia Gdańsk	2026–27	I liga	0	0	0	0	—		—		0	0
Career total			137	4	6	0	4	0	10	2	157	6
