= Fabian Forde =

Barbados international footballer (born 1981)

Personal information
- Full name: Fabian Wesley Forde
- Date of birth: 26 October 1981 (age 45)
- Place of birth: Harrow, England
- Position: Forward

Youth career
- Millwall
- 1998–2001: Watford

Senior career*
Years	Team	Apps	(Gls)
2001–2003	Watford	1	(0)
2002	→ Enfield (loan)	5	(2)
2003	→ Chesham United (loan)		
2003	Crawley Town		
2003	Grays Athletic		
2003–2004	Hendon	5	(0)
2004	Chelmsford City		
2004	Egham Town		
2004	Hemel Hempstead Town		
2004–2005	Hampton & Richmond Borough		
2005	Windsor & Eton		

International career
2003	Barbados U23	1	(1)
2002	Barbados	2	(0)
- * Club domestic league appearances and goals

Fabian Wesley Forde (born 26 October 1981) is a Barbadian former footballer who played forward. Born in England, he represented Barbados at international level. He is currently the director of football for Kettering Town.

== Club career ==
Forde began his senior career at Watford, after playing for the club's academy. On 6 May 2001, Forde made his only first team appearance for Watford in a 2–0 loss against Burnley in the First Division, coming on as an 82nd-minute substitute. During his time at Watford, Forde was loaned out to Enfield and Chesham United, before being released at the end of the 2002–03 season. Upon his release from Watford, Forde signed for Crawley Town in August 2003, before leaving for Grays Athletic and then Hendon in the same year. Forde later played for Chelmsford City, Egham Town, Hemel Hempstead Town, Hampton & Richmond Borough and Windsor & Eton.

== International career ==
In November 2002, Forde played twice for Barbados at the 2002 Central American and Caribbean Games. In September 2003, Forde scored on his debut for Barbados U23 in a 4–1 loss against Guyana U23 in a qualification match for the 2004 Olympics.

== Personal life ==
Forde's son Shaq, is a footballer who plays for Bristol Rovers.
