= Joel Cotterill =

Welsh footballer (born 2004)

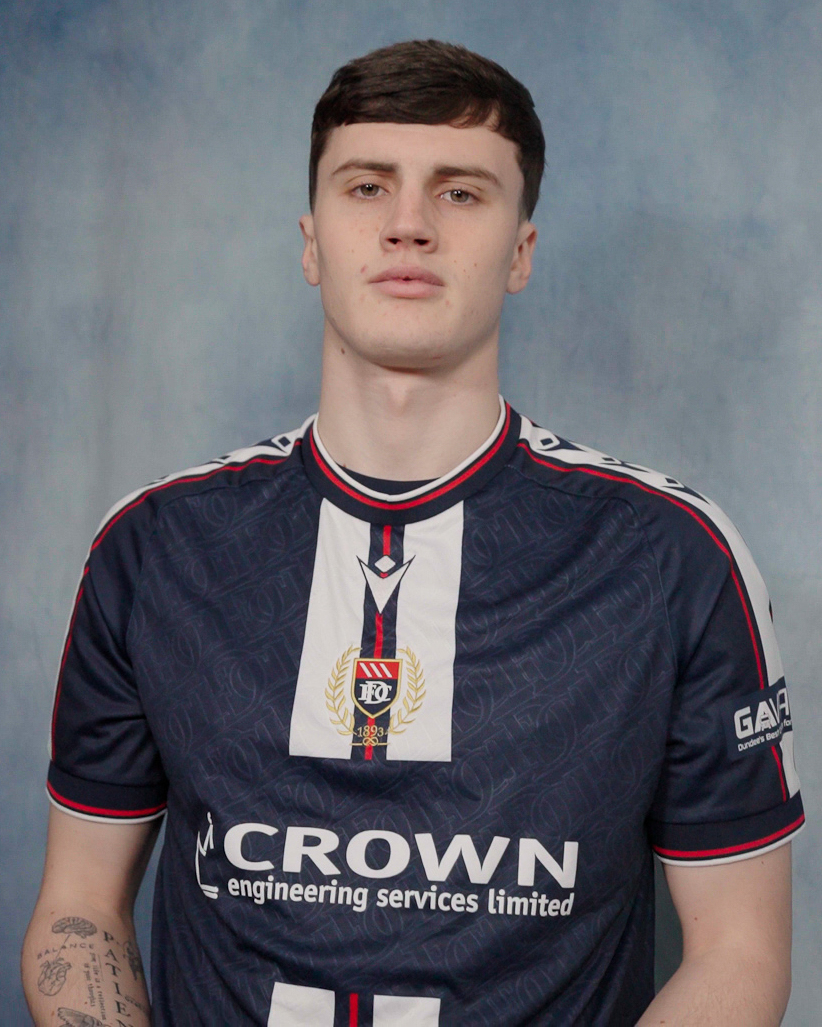
- Joel Cotterill in 2026

Personal information
- Full name: Joel Leigh Cotterill
- Date of birth: 10 October 2004 (age 22)
- Place of birth: Vale of Glamorgan, Wales
- Height: 1.83 m (6 ft 0 in)
- Position: Attacking midfielder

Team information
- Current team: St Johnstone
- Number: 30

Youth career
- 2011–2022: Swansea City

Senior career*
Years	Team	Apps	(Gls)
2022–2026	Swansea City	0	(0)
2023–2024	→ Stockport County (loan)	9	(1)
2024–2025	→ Swindon Town (loan)	41	(3)
2025–2026	→ Bristol Rovers (loan)	13	(0)
2026	→ Dundee (loan)	13	(1)
2026-	St Johnstone	0	(0)

International career^{‡}
2021–2022	Wales U18	4	(0)
2022	Wales U19	3	(0)
2022–	Wales U21	19	(3)
- * Club domestic league appearances and goals as of 11:23, 4 September 2026 (UTC) ‡ National team caps and goals as of 16:53, 8 October 2026 (UTC)

Joel Leigh Cotterill (born 10 October 2004) is a Welsh footballer who plays as an attacking midfielder for Scottish Premiership club St Johnstone. He is a Wales under-21 international.

== Career ==
=== Swansea City ===
Cotterill is a product of the Swansea City academy which he joined aged 7 and he signed his first professional contract in June 2022. On 9 August 2022, Cotterill made his senior debut for Swansea City as a second-half substitute in 2–2 loss on penalties to Oxford United in the EFL Cup.

In August 2023, Cotterill joined EFL League Two club Stockport County for the duration of the 2023–24 season. Cotterill made a number of substitute appearances for Stockport, notably featuring in an 8–0 win over Sutton United where he scored his first senior goal, before being recalled in January 2024.

On 30 July 2024, Cotterill returned to League Two, joining Swindon Town on a season-long loan deal.

On 1 September 2025, Cotterill signed a new two-year contract with Swansea City, before joining League Two club Bristol Rovers on loan until the end of the 2025–26 season. On 6 January 2026 he was recalled from his loan by Swansea City.

On 14 January 2026, he joined Scottish Premiership club Dundee on loan for the remainder of the season. On 25 January, Cotterill made his debut for the Dee as a substitute in a league game away to Rangers. On 21 February, Cotterill scored his first Dundee goal in an away win over Aberdeen.

=== St Johnstone ===
On 1 September 2026 Cotterill joined Scottish Premiership club St Johnstone on a one year contract.

== International career ==
Cotterill is a Wales international at Under-18,Under-19 and Under-21 level.

== Career statistics ==
As of match played 17 May 2026

Appearances and goals by club, season and competition
Club	Season	League			National cup		League cup		Other		Total	
Club	Season	Division	Apps	Goals	Apps	Goals	Apps	Goals	Apps	Goals	Apps	Goals
Swansea City	2022–23	Championship	0	0	0	0	1	0	—		1	0
Swansea City	2023–24	Championship	0	0	0	0	0	0	—		0	0
Swansea City	2024–25	Championship	0	0	0	0	0	0	—		0	0
Swansea City	2025–26	Championship	0	0	0	0	0	0	—		0	0
Swansea City	Total		0	0	0	0	1	0	0	0	1	0
Stockport County (loan)	2023–24	League Two	9	1	2	0	0	0	1 (Note: Appearance(s) in EFL Trophy)	0	12	1
Swindon Town (loan)	2024–25	League Two	41	3	2	1	1	0	4	1	48	5
Bristol Rovers (loan)	2025–26	League Two	13	0	2	1	0	0	1	0	16	1
Dundee (loan)	2025–26	Scottish Premiership	13	1	1	0	—		0	0	14	1
Career total			76	5	7	2	2	0	6	1	91	8

== Personal life ==
He is the cousin of former Wales international David Cotterill.

== Honours ==
Stockport County

- EFL League Two: 2023–24
