= Kamil Conteh =

Footballer

Personal information
- Full name: Kamil Amadu Conteh
- Date of birth: 26 December 2002 (age 23)
- Place of birth: Lambeth, England
- Height: 1.77 m (5 ft 9 1/2 in)
- Position: Defensive midfielder

Team information
- Current team: Bromley
- Number: 22

Youth career
- 2014–2017: Crystal Palace
- 2017–2018: Lambeth Tigers
- 2018–2021: Watford

Senior career*
Years	Team	Apps	(Gls)
2021–2022	Watford	0	(0)
2022	→ Braintree Town (loan)	10	(1)
2022–2023	Middlesbrough	0	(0)
2022–2023	→ Gateshead (loan)	33	(2)
2023–2024	Grimsby Town	25	(0)
2024–2026	Bristol Rovers	62	(1)
2026	→ Lincoln City (loan)	1	(0)
2026–	Bromley	3	(0)

International career^{‡}
2022–	Sierra Leone	12	(0)
- * Club domestic league appearances and goals as of 15:31, 31 August 2026 (UTC) ‡ National team caps and goals as of 13:44, 31 March 2026 (UTC)

Kamil Amadu Conteh (born 26 December 2002) is a professional footballer who plays as a defensive midfielder for EFL League One club Bromley. Born in England, he plays for the Sierra Leone national team.

== Club career ==
=== Watford ===
Conteh joined Watford in 2018, signing his first professional deal in July 2021. He went onto make his first-team debut in January 2022, featuring for 16 minutes during a 4–1 defeat to Leicester City in the third round of the FA Cup.

On 5 February 2022, Conteh joined National League South side Braintree Town on loan from Watford for the remainder of the 2021–22 season. On that same day, he made his debut during a 0–0 draw with Eastbourne Borough, featuring for 87 minutes before being replaced by Michael Dome-Benwin. Just two weeks later, Conteh scored his first goal for the club, giving the Essex-based side a 1–0 home victory over Hungerford Town in the 61st minute.

=== Middlesbrough ===
In April 2022, with his contract coming to a close at Watford, Conteh spent time on trial with Championship side Middlesbrough, subsequently signing a contract with them in May 2022.

On 1 October 2022, Conteh signed for National League club Gateshead on loan until 2 January 2023. This loan was later extended until the end of the season having featured fifteen times, scoring twice. He featured for Gatehead in the 2023 FA Trophy final defeat at Wembley Stadium. At the end of the 2022–23 season, Conteh was voted as the Gateshead Supporters' Player of the Year.

=== Grimsby Town ===
On 3 July 2023, Conteh signed for Grimsby Town for an undisclosed fee.

=== Bristol Rovers ===
On 26 January 2024, Conteh signed for League One club Bristol Rovers on a three-and-a-half-year contract for an undisclosed fee following the activation of his release clause. Local press suggested that the fee paid was in the region of £300,000, despite conflicting earlier reports that a club-record fee had been agreed. He made his debut the following day, impressing in a 3–1 victory over Oxford United.

In March 2025, manager Iñigo Calderón confirmed that Conteh was unlikely to feature again for the remainder of the 2024–25 season. His last appearance for the club had come on 26 December 2024, where he suffered a minor knee injury before noticing unusual swelling in his foot, diagnosed as a bone infection.

Following relegation to League Two, Conteh made his return from his injury, scoring a first goal for the club in November 2025 with a late winner in a 1–0 EFL Trophy victory over Plymouth Argyle.

On 2 February 2026, Conteh joined League One club Lincoln City on loan for the remainder of the 2025–26 season. He made his debut on the final day of the season against Port Vale.

Following the conclusion of the 2025–26 season, Conteh was one of seven players made available to depart the club.

=== Bromley ===
On 9 July 2026, Conteh signed for newly promoted League One club Bromley for an undisclosed fee.

== International career ==
On 17 March 2022, Conteh received a maiden call-up to the Sierra Leone squad for their friendlies against Togo, Liberia and Congo. A week later, Conteh received his first cap during their 3–0 defeat to Togo, playing the full 90 minutes.

== Career statistics ==
=== Club ===
As of end of 2025–26 season

Appearances and goals by club, season and competition
Club	Season	League			FA Cup		EFL Cup		Other		Total	
Club	Season	Division	Apps	Goals	Apps	Goals	Apps	Goals	Apps	Goals	Apps	Goals
Watford	2021–22	Premier League	0	0	1	0	0	0	—		1	0
Braintree Town (loan)	2021–22	National League South	10	1	—		—		—		10	1
Middlesbrough	2022–23	Championship	0	0	0	0	0	0	—		0	0
Gateshead (loan)	2022–23	National League	33	2	3	1	—		6 (Note: Appearance(s) in FA Trophy)	1	42	4
Grimsby Town	2023–24	League Two	25	0	3	0	0	0	1 (Note: Appearance in EFL Trophy)	0	29	0
Bristol Rovers	2023–24	League One	17	0	0	0	0	0	0	0	17	0
Bristol Rovers	2024–25	League One	19	0	2	0	1	0	0	0	22	0
Bristol Rovers	2025–26	League Two	28	1	2	0	1	0	4	1	34	2
Bristol Rovers	Total		62	1	4	0	2	0	4	1	73	2
Lincoln City (loan)	2025–26	League One	1	0	0	0	0	0	0	0	1	0
Career total			132	4	11	1	2	0	11	2	156	7

=== International ===
As of match played 30 March 2026

Appearances and goals by national team and year
National team	Year	Apps	Goals
Sierra Leone	2022	7	0
Sierra Leone	2023	1	0
Sierra Leone	2024	3	0
Sierra Leone	2025	0	0
Sierra Leone	2026	1	0
Total		12	0

== Honours ==
Gateshead

- FA Trophy runner-up: 2022–23

Individual

- Gateshead Supporters' Player of the Year: 2022–23
