= Kane Thompson-Sommers =

English footballer (born 2000)

Personal information
- Full name: Kane Angelis Gavin Thompson-Sommers
- Date of birth: 1 December 2000 (age 25)
- Place of birth: Enfield, England
- Position: Midfielder

Team information
- Current team: Fleetwood Town
- Number: 8

Youth career
- 2012–2016: Tottenham Hotspur
- 2016–2022: Birmingham City

Senior career*
Years	Team	Apps	(Gls)
2018–2019	→ Cockfosters (loan)	1	(0)
2021	→ Woking (loan)	11	(1)
2022–2023	Hereford	33	(2)
2023–2024	FC Halifax Town	30	(1)
2024–2026	Milton Keynes Dons	42	(3)
2026	→ Bristol Rovers (loan)	14	(1)
2026–	Fleetwood Town	0	(0)
- * Club domestic league appearances and goals as of 10:22, 3 May 2026 (UTC)

Kane Angelis Gavin Thompson-Sommers (born 1 December 2000) is an English professional footballer who plays as a midfielder for EFL League Two club Fleetwood Town.

== Career ==
=== Youth and early career ===
Thompson-Sommers began his youth career with Tottenham Hotspur before joining Birmingham City in 2016.

While with the Birmingham youth system, he spent time at Spartan South Midlands League Premier Division club Cockfosters.

He signed his first professional contract at Birmingham in 2019. On 2 August 2021, he joined National League club Woking on a half-season-long loan.

He was released by Birmingham at the end of his contract in May 2022.

=== Hereford ===
In August 2022, Thompson-Sommers signed for National League North club Hereford, after impressing against them in a pre-season friendly as a trialist for a Cardiff City XI. He was released by incoming manager Paul Caddis, after one season with the club.

=== FC Halifax Town ===
On 8 June 2023, Thompson-Sommers stepped up a level to join National League club FC Halifax Town.

=== Milton Keynes Dons ===
On 30 August 2024, Thompson-Sommers signed for EFL League Two club Milton Keynes Dons for an undisclosed fee.

On 16 January 2026, he joined fellow League Two club Bristol Rovers on loan for the remainder of the 2025–26 season.

=== Fleetwood Town ===
On 2 July 2026, Thompson-Sommers signed for EFL League Two club Fleetwood Town for an undisclosed fee, signing a two-year contract.

== Career statistics ==
As of end of 2025–26 season

Appearances and goals by club, season and competition
Club	Season	League			FA Cup		League Cup		Other		Total	
Club	Season	Division	Apps	Goals	Apps	Goals	Apps	Goals	Apps	Goals	Apps	Goals
Cockfosters (loan)	2018–19	Spartan South Midlands; Premier Division	1	0	—		—		—		1	0
Woking (loan)	2021–22	National League	11	1	1	0	—		—		12	1
Hereford	2022–23	National League North	33	2	2	0	—		0	0	35	2
FC Halifax Town	2023–24	National League	30	1	1	0	—		2 (Note: One appearance in FA Trophy, one in National League play-offs)	0	33	1
Milton Keynes Dons	2024–25	League Two	23	2	1	0	—		0	0	24	2
Milton Keynes Dons	2025–26	League Two	19	1	3	0	0	0	3 (Note: Appearance(s) in EFL Trophy)	0	25	1
Milton Keynes Dons	Total		42	3	4	0	0	0	3	0	49	3
Bristol Rovers (loan)	2025–26	League Two	14	1	—		—		—		14	1
Fleetwood Town	2026–27	League Two	0	0	0	0	0	0	0	0	0	0
Career total			131	8	!8	0	0	0	5	0	144	8

== Honours ==
Milton Keynes Dons

- EFL League Two runner-up: 2025–26
