= Yusuf Akhamrich =

English-Moroccan footballer (born 2005)

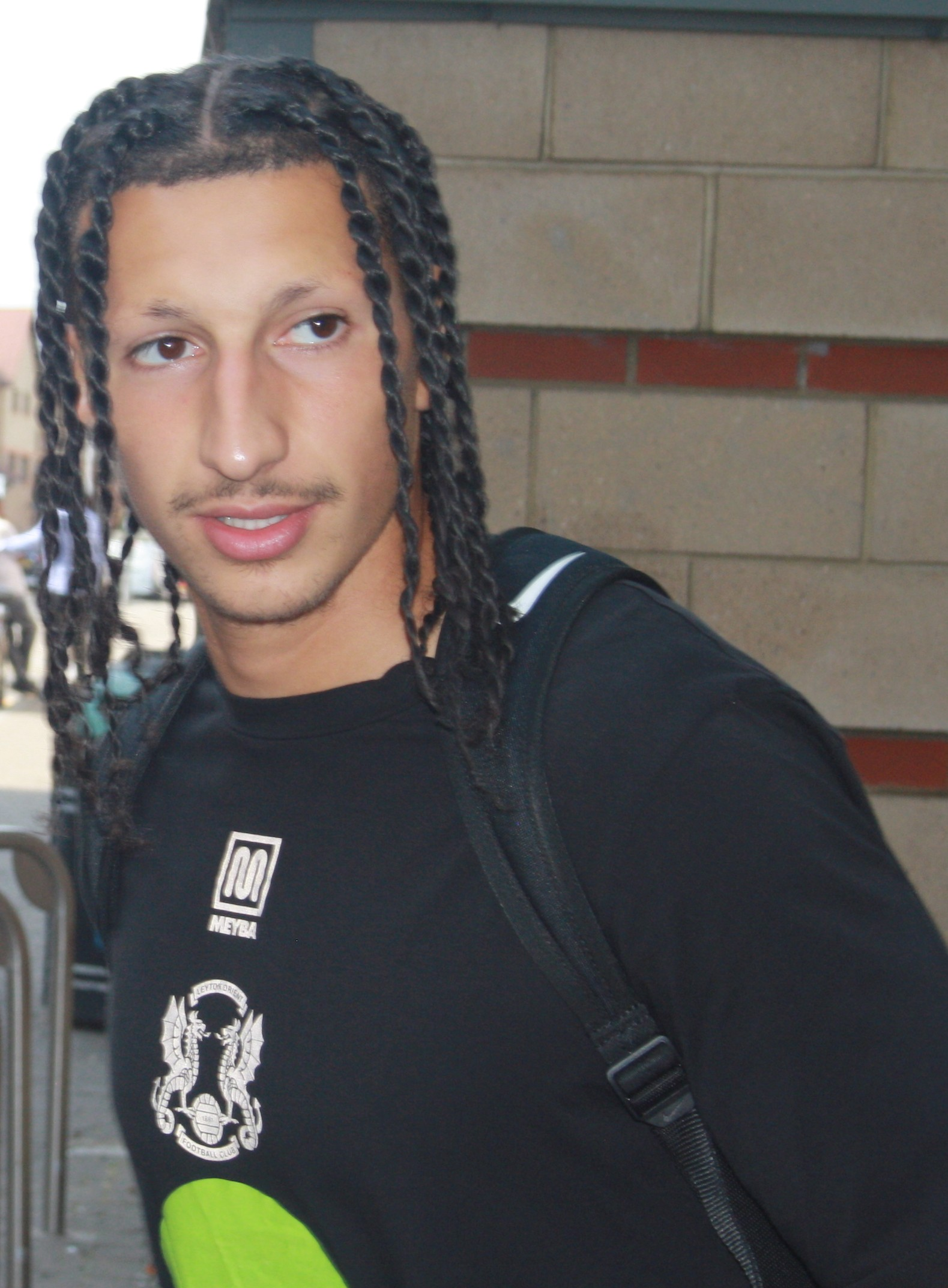
- Akhamrich with Leyton Orient in 2026

Personal information
- Full name: Yusuf Akhamrich
- Date of birth: 5 September 2005 (age 21)
- Place of birth: Whitechapel, England
- Height: 6 ft 0 in (1.83 m)
- Positions: Right winger; right midfielder

Team information
- Current team: Leyton Orient (on loan from Tottenham Hotspur)
- Number: 22

Youth career
- –2025: Tottenham Hotspur

Senior career*
Years	Team	Apps	(Gls)
2025–	Tottenham Hotspur	0	(0)
2026	→ Bristol Rovers (loan)	19	(6)
2026–	→ Leyton Orient (loan)	11	(3)

International career
2026–	Morocco U23	0	(0)
- * Club domestic league appearances and goals as of 23:10, 24 October 2026 (UTC)

Yusuf Akhamrich (Arabic: يوسف أخمريش; born 5 September 2005) is an professional footballer who plays as a right winger or right midfielder for EFL League One club Leyton Orient, on loan from Premier League club Tottenham Hotspur. Born in England, he represented Morocco at youth level.

== Club career ==
Born in London of Moroccan descent, Akhamrich attended Morpeth School in Bethnal Green. After joining the Tottenham Hotspur academy, he scored 25 goals for Tottenham's under-16s in the 2021-2022 season. He then played 43 matches with Spurs U18, scoring nine goals. In January 2025, he signed a new three year contract with the club.

In November 2025, he was an unused substitute with the first team squad in the UEFA Champions League match against Copenhagen. He was also named as a substitute on 8 November 2025 for Spurs' match in the Premier League against Manchester United.

On 22 January 2026, Akhamrich joined EFL League Two club Bristol Rovers on loan for the rest of the season. Having already made two substitute appearances, he made his full debut on 31 January, scoring his side's first two goals in a 3–0 relegation six-pointer victory over Newport County, the first of these strikes being nominated for League Two Goal of the Month. His impressive form continued, seeing him named as the club's Player of the Month for February.

Having scored six goals in 19 appearances for Bristol Rovers in League Two, he joined EFL League One club Leyton Orient on a season-long loan deal in July 2026. He scored his first goal for Orient on 22 August 2026, in a 2-0 away league win against Wigan Athletic.

== International career ==
In March 2026, Akhamrich received a first call-up to the Morocco U23 squad ahead of two friendlies against Ivory Coast.

== Career statistics ==
As of end of 2025–26 season

Appearances and goals by club, season and competition
Club	Season	League			National cup		League cup		Continental		Other		Total	
Club	Season	Division	Apps	Goals	Apps	Goals	Apps	Goals	Apps	Goals	Apps	Goals	Apps	Goals
Tottenham Hotspur U21	2024–25	—			—		—		—		3 (Note: Appearance(s) in EFL Trophy)	0	3	0
Tottenham Hotspur U21	2025–26	—			—		—		—		3	1	3	1
Tottenham Hotspur U21	Total				—		—		—		6	1	6	1
Bristol Rovers (loan)	2025–26	League Two	19	6	—		—		—		0	0	19	6
Career total			19	6	0	0	0	0	0	0	6	1	25	7
