= Taylor Moore (footballer) =

English footballer (born 1997)

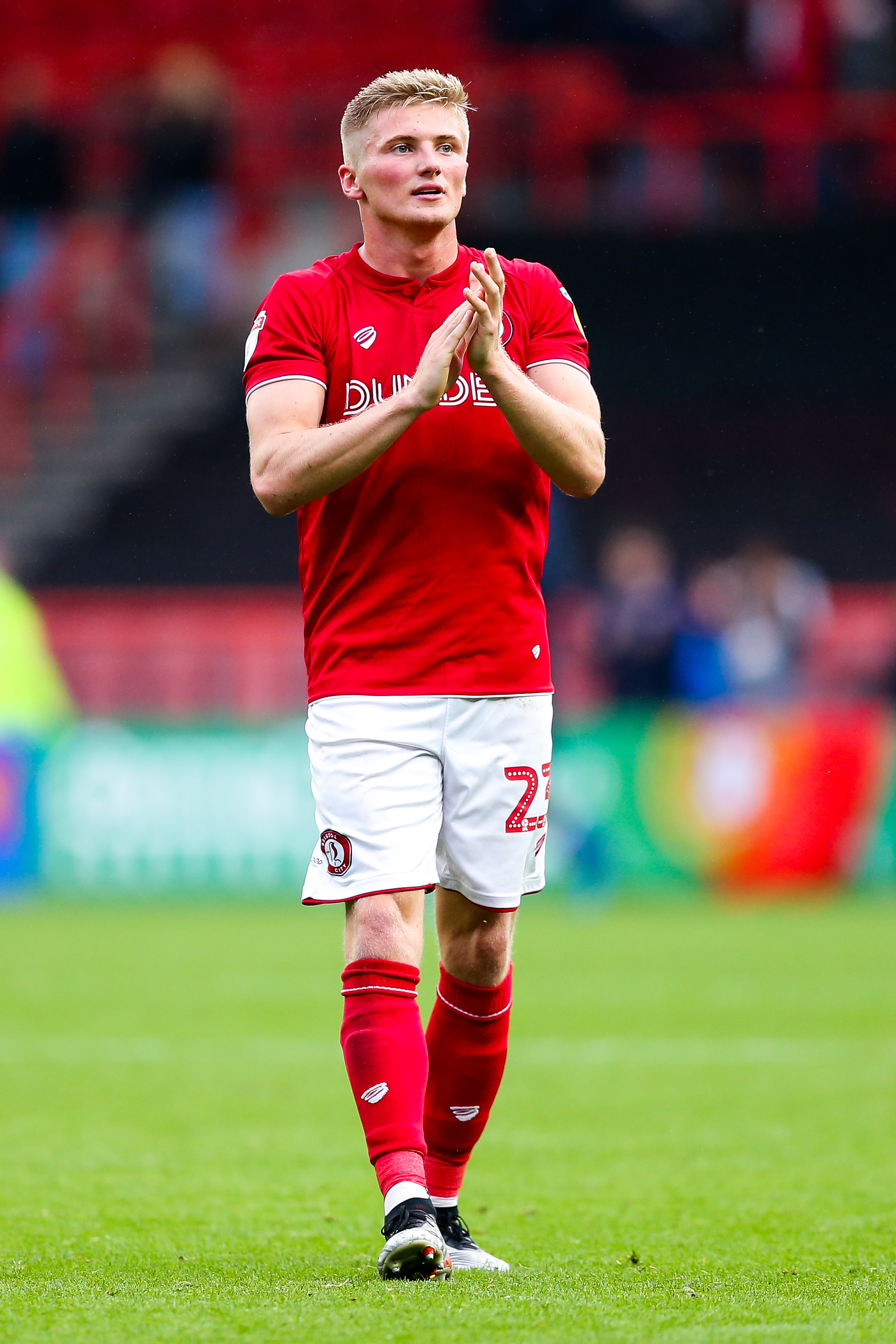
- Taylor Moore playing for Bristol City in 2020

Personal information
- Full name: Taylor David Moore
- Date of birth: 12 May 1997 (age 29)
- Place of birth: Walthamstow, England
- Height: 6 ft 2 in (1.87 m)
- Position: Defender

Team information
- Current team: FC Košice

Youth career
- 2001–2003: Debden Sports
- 2003–2004: West Ham United
- 2004–2008: Étaples
- 2009–2015: Lens

Senior career*
| Years | Team | Apps | (Gls) |
| 2014–2016 | Lens B | 35 | (0) |
| 2015–2016 | Lens | 9 | (0) |
| 2016–2023 | Bristol City | 48 | (1) |
| 2017 | → Bury (loan) | 19 | (0) |
| 2017–2018 | → Cheltenham Town (loan) | 36 | (0) |
| 2018–2019 | → Southend United (loan) | 34 | (1) |
| 2020 | → Blackpool (loan) | 8 | (0) |
| 2021–2022 | → Heart of Midlothian (loan) | 22 | (0) |
| 2022–2023 | → Shrewsbury Town (loan) | 42 | (0) |
| 2023–2024 | Valenciennes | 17 | (0) |
| 2024 | Valenciennes B | 1 | (0) |
| 2024–2026 | Bristol Rovers | 51 | (1) |
| 2026– | FC Košice | 0 | (0) |

International career^{‡}
| 2014 | England U17 | 9 | (0) |
| 2014–2015 | England U18 | 6 | (1) |
| 2015–2016 | England U19 | 11 | (0) |
| 2016 | England U20 | 6 | (1) |
- * Club domestic league appearances and goals as of 13:06, 21 August 2026 (UTC) ‡ National team caps and goals as of 13:07, 26 February 2020 (UTC)

Taylor David Moore (born 12 May 1997) is an English professional footballer who plays as a defender for Slovak First Football League club FC Košice.

== Club career ==
=== Early career ===
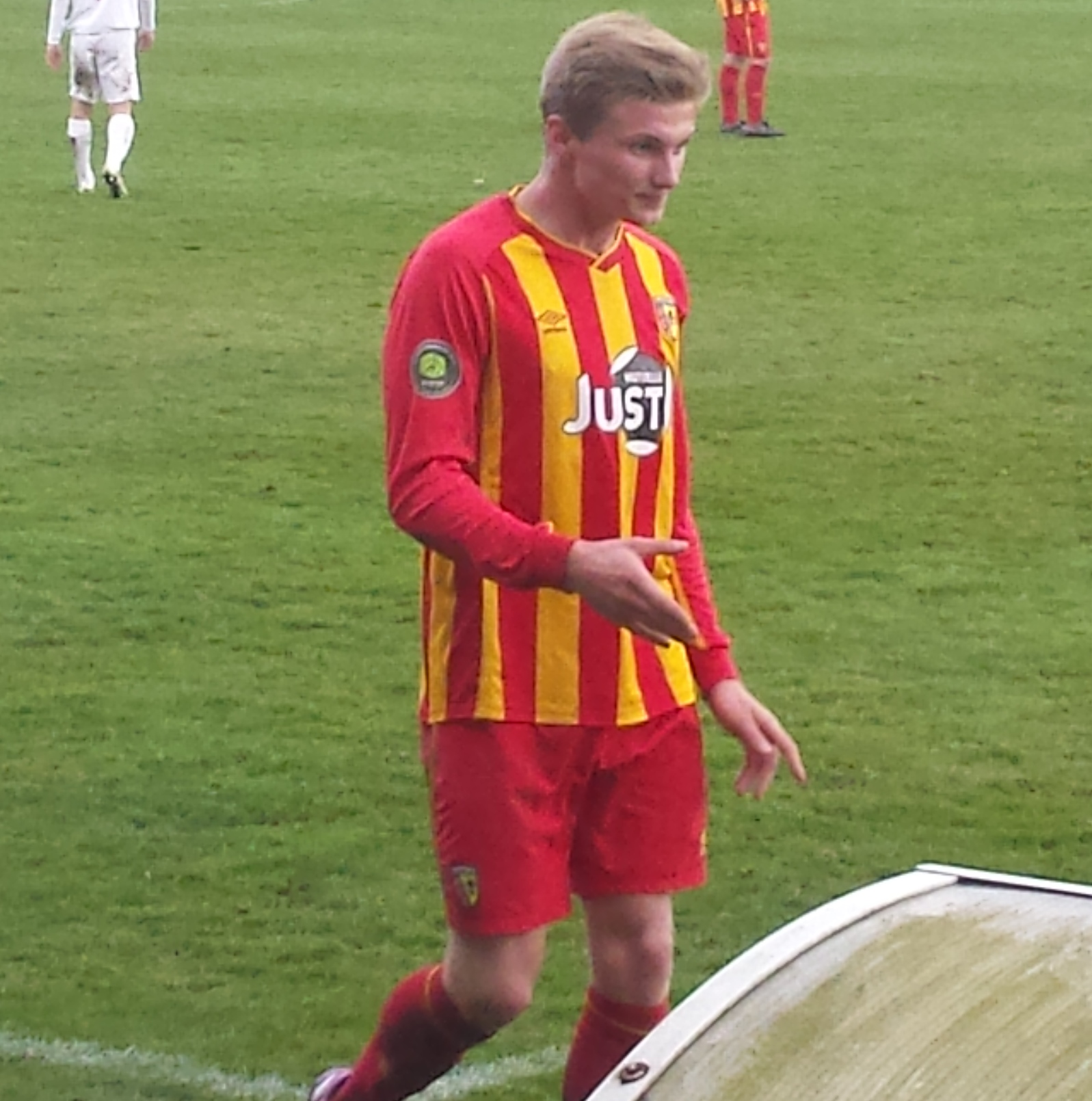
Moore playing for Lens B.

Moore was born in Walthamstow in East London, but moved to France as a seven-year-old. Moore spent a year in the academy of his local side West Ham United before moving to France. Upon arriving in France, he joined amateur club Etaples before joining the academy at Lens at the age of 12.. In September 2026 he moves to FC Košice

=== Lens ===
Having made a progression through the Lens academy, Moore signed his first professional contract with the club on 8 December 2014.

On 3 May 2015, with Antoine Kombouaré as coach, he made his first-team debut for Lens, starting in an away derby match against Lille playing out of position at right back and producing an assist for his team's only goal in a 3–1 loss. Moore went on to make four appearances in the 2014–15 season.

In the 2015–16 season, Moore made five appearances for the club. However, his first team opportunities were limited after he fell out of favour with manager Kombouaré and was sent to play in the reserves. Despite this, Moore was the subject of a €10 million transfer bid from Lyon in the January transfer window. Lens rejected the bid, demanding €15 million instead. Moore was expected to leave the club by the end of the January transfer window, but no club made an offer and he stayed at the club for the rest of the season.

Ahead of the 2016–17 season, Moore's future at Lens became uncertain and he found himself linked with a move back to England, with Bristol City, Tottenham Hotspur, Southampton, West Ham United and Crystal Palace also showed an interest in signing him. Amid the transfer speculation, Moore was expected to fight for a first team place under the new management of Alain Casanova.

=== Bristol City ===
On 25 August 2016, Moore signed for Championship club Bristol City on a three-year contract for an undisclosed fee believed to be in the region of £1.5m. Upon joining the club, Moore revealed that then-teammate Tammy Abraham played a role in convincing him to join Bristol City. He made his debut in an EFL Cup match away to Fulham, in which Bristol City won 2–1.

Less than a week after the January transfer window opened in 2017, Moore was loaned out to struggling League One side Bury to gain further experience.

On 30 August 2017, Moore signed for Cheltenham Town on loan until January 2018.

Moore was loaned to Scottish club Heart of Midlothian in August 2021.

Moore signed on loan for Shrewsbury Town in July 2022.

In May 2023, Moore was released from Bristol City.

=== Valenciennes ===
On 23 July 2023, Moore signed for Ligue 2 club Valenciennes on a three-year contract.

In April 2024, it was reported that Valenciennes were in the process of dismissing Moore after he had hit a supporter following a reserves match against Lille in February.

=== Bristol Rovers ===
On 30 June 2024, Moore joined League One club Bristol Rovers on a three-year deal with the option for a further season. Having made his debut in the opening day victory over Northampton Town, he continued to impress in the first month of the season, talking of how he was falling back in love with football following a difficult six months. On 18 April 2025, Moore scored his first goal in five-and-a-half years, opening the scoring in a 1–1 draw with high-flying Wrexham as Rovers gained a crucial point in their fight against relegation.

Following the conclusion of the 2025–26 season, Moore was made available for transfer or loan. Having not featured in either of the matchday squads for club's first two fixtures, manager Steve Evans revealed that Moore had turned down 'two or three options' to leave the club. On 21 August 2026, he departed the club by mutual consent.

=== FC Košice ===
On 5 September 2026, Moore joined Slovak First Football League club FC Košice.

== International career ==
Moore represented England at England U17 and England U18 levels, and captained the England U19s. He was a part of the U17 team that won the European Championships in 2014. He has six caps for the England U20s.

== Personal life ==
Moore has three brothers, Aston, Jaxon and Keaton. He attended Staples Road Primary School in Loughton, Essex, before he moved to France aged 7. Moore is fluent in French without any foreign accent.

Following a suicide attempt from his mother, Moore was inspired to start the 5k Your Way initiative, encouraging participants to join in a five-kilometer walk while engaging in open conversations about mental health. For his work, he was named EFL Community Player of the Year at the 2025 EFL Awards.

== Career statistics ==
As of end of 2025–26 season

Appearances and goals by club, season and competition
| Club | Season | League | | | National cup (Note: Includes FA Cup, Coupe de France) | | League cup (Note: Includes Coupe de la Ligue, EFL Cup) | | Other | | Total | |
| Club | Season | Division | Apps | Goals | Apps | Goals | Apps | Goals | Apps | Goals | Apps | Goals |
|---|---|---|---|---|---|---|---|---|---|---|---|---|
| Lens B | 2014–15 | CFA | 18 | 0 | — | | — | | — | | 18 | 0 |
| Lens B | 2015–16 | CFA | 17 | 0 | — | | — | | — | | 17 | 0 |
| Lens B | Total | | 35 | 0 | — | | — | | — | | 35 | 0 |
| Lens | 2014–15 | Ligue 1 | 4 | 0 | 0 | 0 | 0 | 0 | — | | 4 | 0 |
| Lens | 2015–16 | Ligue 2 | 5 | 0 | 0 | 0 | 1 | 0 | — | | 6 | 0 |
| Lens | Total | | 9 | 0 | 0 | 0 | 1 | 0 | — | | 10 | 0 |
| Bristol City | 2016–17 | Championship | 5 | 0 | 0 | 0 | 2 | 0 | — | | 7 | 0 |
| Bristol City | 2017–18 | Championship | 0 | 0 | 0 | 0 | 0 | 0 | — | | 0 | 0 |
| Bristol City | 2018–19 | Championship | 0 | 0 | 0 | 0 | 0 | 0 | — | | 0 | 0 |
| Bristol City | 2019–20 | Championship | 21 | 1 | 2 | 0 | 1 | 0 | — | | 24 | 1 |
| Bristol City | 2020–21 | Championship | 22 | 0 | 3 | 0 | 3 | 0 | — | | 28 | 0 |
| Bristol City | 2021–22 | Championship | 0 | 0 | 0 | 0 | 1 | 0 | — | | 1 | 0 |
| Bristol City | 2022–23 | Championship | 0 | 0 | 0 | 0 | 0 | 0 | — | | 0 | 0 |
| Bristol City | Total | | 48 | 1 | 5 | 0 | 7 | 0 | — | | 60 | 1 |
| Bury (loan) | 2016–17 | League One | 19 | 0 | — | | — | | — | | 19 | 0 |
| Cheltenham Town (loan) | 2017–18 | League Two | 36 | 0 | 1 | 0 | — | | 2 (Note: Appearances in EFL Trophy) | 0 | 39 | 0 |
| Southend United (loan) | 2018–19 | League One | 34 | 1 | 1 | 0 | 0 | 0 | 5 | 0 | 40 | 1 |
| Blackpool (loan) | 2019–20 | League One | 8 | 0 | — | | — | | — | | 8 | 0 |
| Heart of Midlothian (loan) | 2021–22 | Scottish Premiership | 22 | 0 | 1 | 0 | 0 | 0 | — | | 23 | 0 |
| Shrewsbury Town (loan) | 2022–23 | League One | 42 | 0 | 3 | 0 | 2 | 0 | 1 | 0 | 48 | 0 |
| Valenciennes | 2023–24 | Ligue 2 | 17 | 0 | 4 | 0 | — | | — | | 21 | 0 |
| Valenciennes B | 2023–24 | National 3 | 1 | 0 | — | | — | | — | | 1 | 0 |
| Bristol Rovers | 2024–25 | League One | 33 | 1 | 3 | 0 | 0 | 0 | 2 | 0 | 38 | 1 |
| Bristol Rovers | 2025–26 | League Two | 18 | 0 | 2 | 0 | 1 | 0 | 5 | 0 | 26 | 0 |
| Bristol Rovers | Total | | 51 | 1 | 5 | 0 | 1 | 0 | 7 | 0 | 64 | 1 |
| Career total | | | 322 | 3 | 20 | 0 | 11 | 0 | 15 | 0 | 368 | 3 |

== Honours ==
England U17

- UEFA European U-17 Championship: 2014
