= Luke Southwood =

Northern Ireland footballer (born 1997)

Personal information
- Full name: Luke Kevin Southwood
- Date of birth: 6 December 1997 (age 28)
- Place of birth: Oxford, England
- Height: 1.84 m (6 ft 0 in)
- Position: Goalkeeper

Team information
- Current team: Blackpool
- Number: 23

Youth career
- –2014: Reading

Senior career*
Years	Team	Apps	(Gls)
2014–2023	Reading	26	(0)
2014–2015	→ Harefield United (loan)	5	(0)
2017–2018	→ Bath City (loan)	42	(0)
2018–2019	→ Eastleigh (loan)	20	(0)
2019–2020	→ Hamilton Academical (loan)	15	(0)
2022–2023	→ Cheltenham Town (loan)	46	(0)
2023–2024	Cheltenham Town	46	(0)
2024–2025	Bolton Wanderers	20	(0)
2025–2026	Bristol Rovers	22	(0)
2026–	Blackpool	0	(0)

International career
2016	England U19	1	(0)
2016–2017	England U20	5	(0)
2022	Northern Ireland	1	(0)
- * Club domestic league appearances and goals as of 17:57, 2 May 2026 (UTC)

Luke Kevin Southwood (born 6 December 1997) is a professional footballer who plays as a goalkeeper for EFL League One club Blackpool. Born in England, he plays for the Northern Ireland national team.

== Club career ==
=== Reading ===
On 11 May 2018, Reading announced that they had offered a new contract to Luke Southwood, with a new two-year contract being confirmed as signed on 2 July 2018.

On 7 May 2021, Reading announced that Southwood had signed a new two-year contract, keeping him at the club until the summer of 2023.

==== Loans ====
On 4 August 2017, Southwood joined Bath City on a six-month loan deal, which was extended until the end of the season on 3 January 2018. He was awarded player of the season after an outstanding year.

On 24 December 2018, Southwood joined Eastleigh on an initial one-month loan deal, with the loan being extended until the end of the season on 24 January 2019. Eastleigh managed to get to the semi-finals of the National League play-offs with Southwood playing a key part in that, also getting player of the month in April.

On 1 August 2019, Southwood joined Hamilton Academical on loan until 5 January 2020. On 21 January 2020, Southwood signed a new contract with Reading until the summer of 2021, and then returned to Hamilton Academical on loan until the end of the season.

On 22 July 2022, Southwood joined Cheltenham Town on a season-long loan deal. During that time he kept sixteen clean sheets in league one and helped them to a 16th place finish.

On 17 May 2023, Reading announced that Southwood would leave the club at the end of his contract.

=== Cheltenham Town ===
On 11 July 2023, Southwood returned to Cheltenham Town on a permanent one-year deal. On 22 May 2024, the club announced he had rejected a new contract and would be leaving the club.

=== Bolton Wanderers ===
On 21 June 2024, Southwood signed a two-year contract with EFL League One club Bolton Wanderers. Across the 2024–25 season, he competed with Nathan Baxter for the position of first-choice goalkeeper, breaking into the team in January 2025 where he remained following the appointment of Steven Schumacher as new head coach before once again losing his place in March.

=== Bristol Rovers ===
On 6 July 2025, Southwood signed for League Two club Bristol Rovers on a two-year deal for an undisclosed fee. The transfer saw him reunite with manager Darrell Clarke and goalkeeping coach James Bittner, whom Southwood had played under at Cheltenham Town. He was named as the club's vice-captain ahead of the opening match of the season. Having spent the first half of the season as the club's first choice goalkeeper, he was dropped for Brad Young in January 2026, not featuring again for the remainder of the season. He was made available for a permanent or loan departure at the end of the 2025–26 season.

=== Blackpool ===
On 11 August 2026, Southwood signed for League One club Blackpool for an undisclosed fee, signing a one-year contract with an option for another year.

== International career ==
Southwood made his debut for the England under-19 team, play the first 45minutes in a 1–0 defeat to Mexico in June 2016.

Southwood was selected for the England under-20 team in the 2017 FIFA U-20 World Cup and was an unused substitute in the final where England beat Venezuela 1–0.

In November 2021, Southwood was called up to the Northern Ireland national team for the first time, for whom he qualified for through a grandmother. He debuted with Northern Ireland in a friendly 3–1 win over Luxembourg on 25 March 2022.

== Career statistics ==
=== Club ===
As of end of 2025–26 season

Appearances and goals by club, season and competition
Club	Season	League			National cup (Note: Includes FA Cup, Scottish Cup)		League cup (Note: Includes EFL Cup)		Other		Total	
Club	Season	Division	Apps	Goals	Apps	Goals	Apps	Goals	Apps	Goals	Apps	Goals
Reading	2014–15	Championship	0	0	0	0	0	0	—		0	0
Reading	2015–16	Championship	0	0	0	0	0	0	—		0	0
Reading	2016–17	Championship	0	0	0	0	0	0	—		0	0
Reading	2017–18	Championship	0	0	0	0	0	0	—		0	0
Reading	2018–19	Championship	0	0	0	0	0	0	—		0	0
Reading	2019–20	Championship	0	0	0	0	0	0	—		0	0
Reading	2020–21	Championship	1	0	1	0	2	0	—		4	0
Reading	2021–22	Championship	25	0	0	0	1	0	—		26	0
Reading	Total		26	0	1	0	3	0	—		30	0
Harefield United (loan)	2014–15	Spartan South Midlands League; Premier Division	5	0	0	0	—		0	0	5	0
Bath City (loan)	2017–18	National League South	42	0	3	0	—		5 (Note: Three appearances in FA Trophy, two appearances in Somerset Premier Cup)	0	50	0
Eastleigh (loan)	2018–19	National League	20	0	0	0	—		2 (Note: Appearances in National League play-offs)	0	22	0
Hamilton Academical (loan)	2019–20	Scottish Premiership	15	0	1	0	0	0	2 (Note: Appearances for Hamilton under-21s in the Scottish Challenge Cup)	0	18	0
Cheltenham Town (loan)	2022–23	League One	46	0	1	0	1	0	3 (Note: Appearance(s) in EFL Trophy)	0	51	0
Cheltenham Town	2023–24	League One	46	0	1	0	1	0	0	0	48	0
Bolton Wanderers	2024–25	League One	20	0	1	0	3	0	2	0	26	0
Bristol Rovers	2025–26	League Two	22	0	2	0	1	0	2	0	27	0
Blackpool	2026–27	League One	0	0	0	0	0	0	0	0	0	0
Career total			242	0	10	0	9	0	16	0	277	0

=== International ===
As of match played 4 June 2026

Appearances and goals by national team and year
National team	Year	Apps	Goals
Northern Ireland
Northern Ireland	2022	1	0
Northern Ireland	2026	1	0
Total		2	0

== Honours ==
England U20

- FIFA U-20 World Cup: 2017
