= Shaq Forde =

English footballer (born 2004)

Personal information
- Full name: Shaqai Tyreece Steven Forde
- Date of birth: 5 May 2004 (age 22)
- Place of birth: Watford, England
- Height: 5 ft 9 in (1.74 m)
- Position: Forward

Team information
- Current team: Bristol Rovers
- Number: 7

Youth career
- 2012–2022: Watford

Senior career*
Years	Team	Apps	(Gls)
2022–2024	Watford	0	(0)
2022	→ Kings Langley (loan)	3	(2)
2022–2023	→ York City (loan)	20	(9)
2023–2024	→ Leyton Orient (loan)	40	(9)
2024–	Bristol Rovers	55	(6)
- * Club domestic league appearances and goals as of 10:05, 3 May 2026 (UTC)

Shaqai Tyreece Steven Forde (born 5 May 2004) is an English professional footballer who plays as a forward for EFL League Two club Bristol Rovers.

== Early life ==
Shaqai Tyreece Steven Forde was born on 5 May 2004 in Watford, Hertfordshire. He is the son of former footballer Fabian Forde and is of Barbadian descent through his father, who played for the Barbados national team.

== Career ==
=== Watford ===
Forde started his career with Watford in 2012. He made his first-team debut on 8 January 2022 aged 17 as a 74th-minute substitute in a 4–1 away defeat to Leicester City in the 2021–22 FA Cup third round.

In February 2022, Forde joined Southern League Premier Division South club Kings Langley on a one-month loan. He made his debut on 26 February in a 4–0 home win over Wimborne Town in the league, in which he scored a goal 10 minutes into the match, won a penalty kick and recorded an assist. The loan was extended by a further month in March before Forde was recalled by Watford on 1 April to join first-team training, having scored two goals in three appearances for Kings Langley. A successful 2021–22 season saw him named Watford's Young Player of the Season before signing a professional contract with the club in July.

Forde joined National League club York City on 28 December 2022 on loan until the end of the 2022–23 season. He scored in the 90th minute of his debut on 2 January 2023 with a shot into the bottom-right corner of the goal as York drew 2–2 away to Gateshead, after entering the match as a 66th-minute substitute. Five days later, on his first start for the team, he scored a hat trick, helping York City to a 4–1 home win over Maidstone United. He had a successful spell at York City, scoring nine goals in 20 appearance.

On 14 August 2023, Forde joined League One club Leyton Orient on a season-long loan deal. On 26 August 2023, his second appearance for the club, Forde scored a first senior English Football League goal as he opened the scoring in a 2–0 victory over Cambridge United.

=== Bristol Rovers ===
On 30 August 2024, Forde signed for League One club Bristol Rovers for an undisclosed fee on an initial three-year deal. On 5 October 2024, he scored his first goal for the club, equalising in an eventual 3–1 victory over Burton Albion. In October 2024, Forde was racially abused on social media following a match. Ahead of the club's following league match, fan podcast GasCast set up a crowdfunder to purchase two flags to go on display at the club's Memorial Stadium representing fans' commitment to diversity and inclusion.

Following a disappointing first season that ended in relegation, Forde suffered a hamstring injury in the club's penultimate pre-season friendly ahead of the 2025–26 season, expected to miss the first twelve weeks of the season. On 22 November 2025, following a 1–0 loss to Cheltenham Town, a seventh consecutive league defeat that left the Gas 20th in League Two, Forde and teammate Ruel Sotiriou's intensity in training were criticised by manager Darrell Clarke following the pair's omission from the matchday squad. On 26 December 2025, with Rovers leading 2–0, Forde received a third sending off for the club for a second bookable offence with his side going on to lose 3–2. Following the match, new manager Steve Evans labelled Forde's decision to make the second challenge as 'atrocious'. His form under Evans improved over the second-half of the season, becoming a key player in the club's impressive run of form, often playing in a more central role than he had previously.

In July 2026, the club reportedly rejected a 'substantial six-figure fee' for Forde with the manager viewing him as an essential part of the team for the coming season.

== Style of play ==
Forde plays as a forward and in March 2022 described himself as being "creative, powerful and always looking to go forwards".

== Career statistics ==
As of end of 2025–26 season

Appearances and goals by club, season and competition
Club	Season	League			FA Cup		EFL Cup		Other		Total	
Club	Season	Division	Apps	Goals	Apps	Goals	Apps	Goals	Apps	Goals	Apps	Goals
Watford	2021–22	Premier League	0	0	1	0	0	0	—		1	0
Watford	2022–23	Championship	0	0	0	0	0	0	—		0	0
Watford	2023–24	Championship	0	0	0	0	0	0	—		0	0
Watford	Total		0	0	1	0	0	0	0	0	1	0
Kings Langley (loan)	2021–22	Southern League; Premier Division South	3	2	—		—		—		3	2
York City (loan)	2022–23	National League	20	9	—		—		0	0	20	9
Leyton Orient (loan)	2023–24	League One	40	9	2	0	0	0	1 (Note: Appearance(s) in EFL Trophy)	0	43	9
Bristol Rovers	2024–25	League One	31	2	2	0	0	0	1	0	34	2
Bristol Rovers	2025–26	League Two	24	4	2	0	0	0	2	1	28	5
Bristol Rovers	Total		55	6	4	0	0	0	3	1	62	7
Career total			118	26	7	0	0	0	4	1	129	27

== Honours ==
Individual

- Watford Young Player of the Season: 2021–22
