= List of Brentford F.C. international players =

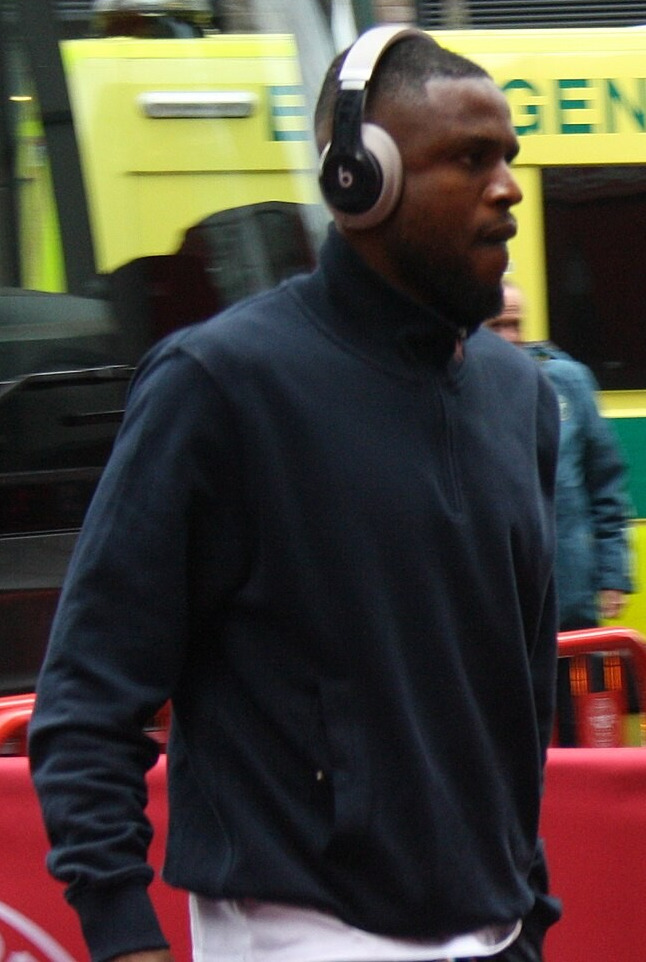
Defensive midfielder Frank Onyeka is Brentford's most-capped international player, with 44 caps for Nigeria.

Brentford Football Club is an English professional football club based in Brentford, Hounslow, London. Between 1897 and 1920, the first team competed in the London League, Southern League and Western League. Since 1920, the first team has competed in the Football League, the Premier League and other nationally and internationally organised competitions. All players who won a full international cap while contracted to Brentford are listed below.

== Records and notable players ==
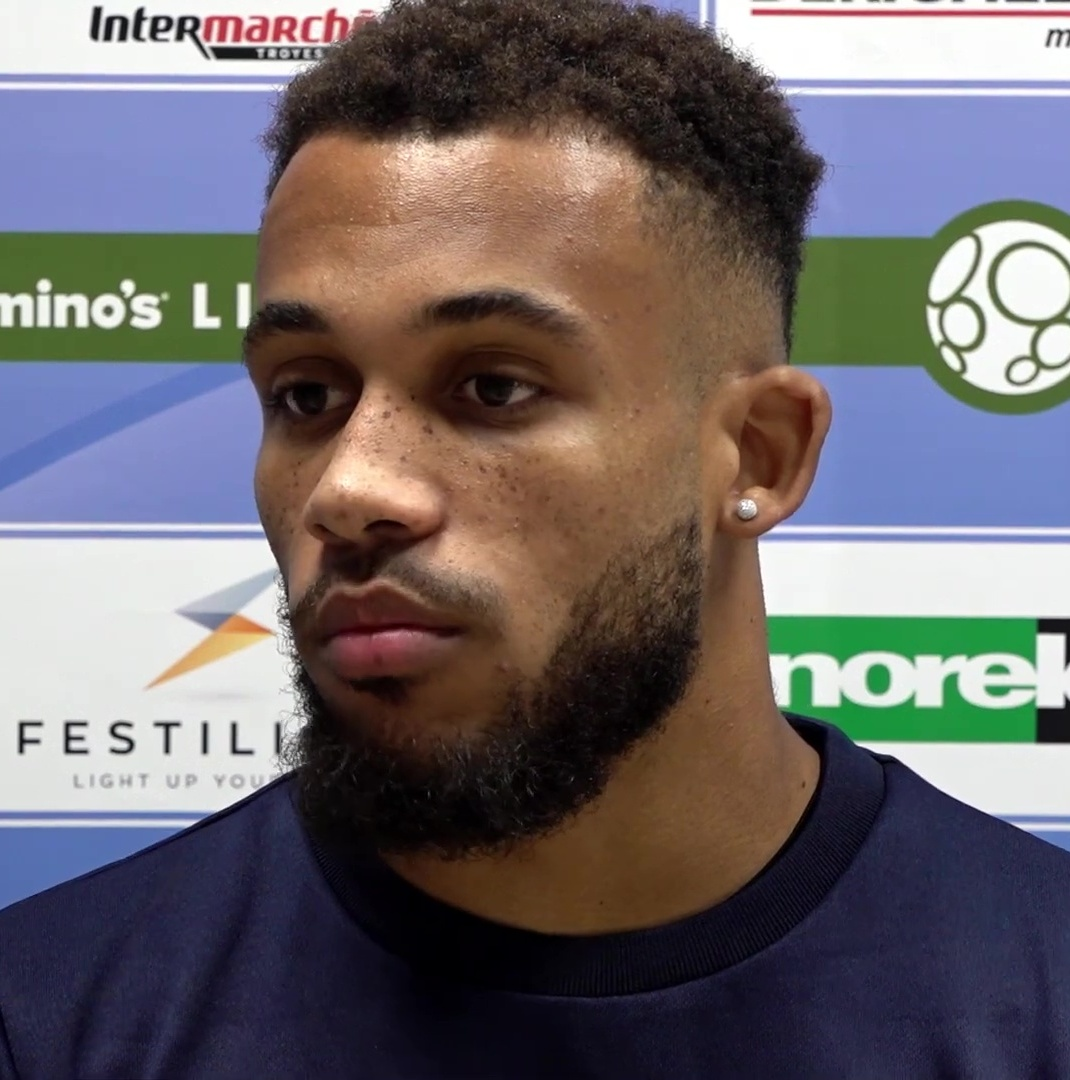
Forward player Bryan Mbeumo is Brentford's joint-record international goalscorer, with six goals for Cameroon.

Joe Connor was the first Brentford player to be capped at international level, playing and scoring for Ireland in a 2–0 victory over Scotland in March 1903. Frank Onyeka is Brentford's most-capped international player, with 44 caps for Nigeria. Halil Dervişoğlu and Bryan Mbeumo have scored the most international goals while a Brentford player, with six for Turkey and Cameroon respectively. In March 2023, Ivan Toney became the first Brentford player to be capped by England since Les Smith in May 1939. Kolbeinn Finnsson and Daniel O'Shaughnessy won senior caps for Iceland and Finland respectively, without making a first team appearance for Brentford. In March 2021, the total number of caps won by contracted Brentford players passed 200. The club record for first team, B and U18 players called up during an international break is 24 in March 2026, with a record 21 players winning caps during the break.

In June 2018, Henrik Dalsgaard became Brentford's first contracted player to play at a major international tournament, when he started in Denmark's opening match at the 2018 FIFA World Cup. By 2024, Brentford players had also appeared at the European Championship, the Africa Cup of Nations, the Asian Cup, the Copa América and the Gold Cup. 12 current and former Brentford players represented their nations at the 2026 FIFA World Cup.

Current Brentford players who have been capped at full international level while contracted to the club are Kristoffer Ajer, Michel Boni, Nathan Collins, Mikkel Damsgaard, El Hadji Malick Diouf, Benjamin Fredrick, Rico Henry, Aaron Hickey,Vitaly Janelt, Mathias Jensen, Kim Ji-soo, Michael Kayode, Dango Ouattara, Mamadou Sangaré, Kevin Schade, Igor Thiago and Yehor Yarmolyuk.

== Key ==
- Appearance and goal totals for full internationals include all FIFA-sanctioned matches. Substitute appearances are included. Wartime matches are regarded as unofficial and are excluded.
- Statistics are correct as of matches played 17 November 2026.

=== Playing positions ===
GK	Goalkeeper	RB	Right back	RW	Right winger	DF	Defender	HB	Half back	IF	Inside forward	DM	Defensive midfielder
OL	Outside left	LB	Left back	LW	Left winger	CB	Centre back	FW	Forward	FB	Full back	RM	Right midfielder
W	Winger	MF	Midfielder	ST	Striker	WH	Wing half	AM	Attacking midfielder	CM	Central midfielder	LM	Left midfielder
U	Utility player	OR	Outside right	SW	Sweeper	LH	Left half	RH	Right half				

Symbol	Meaning
‡	Brentford player in the 2026–27 season.
*	Player has left Brentford but is still playing in a professional league.
♦	Player went on to manage the club.
♠	Player holds a club record.

== Players ==
Player	Nationality	Position	Total			Total with Brentford			Notes	Ref.
Player	Nationality	Position	Years	Caps	Goals	Years	Caps	Goals	Notes	Ref.
Thomas Strakosha *	Albania	GK	2017–	47	0	2022–2024	12	0		
Saïd Benrahma *	Algeria	RW	2015–	40	4	2019–2020	5	0		
Gus Hurdle	Barbados	RB	1996–2000	7	0	1996	2	0		
Michel Boni ‡	Benin	FW	2026–	2	0	2026–	2	0		
Igor Thiago ‡	Brazil	FW	2026–	5	2	2026–	5	2		
Dango Ouattara ‡	Burkina Faso	RW	2021–	47	13	2025–	17	3		
Bryan Mbeumo ♠ *	Cameroon	W/FW	2022–	37	8	2022–2025	22	6 ♠		
Niall Thompson	Canada	FW	1993–2000	9	2	1998	1	0		
Yoane Wissa *	DR Congo	FW/W	2020–	47	15	2022–2025	31	5		
Andreas Bjelland	Denmark	CB/LB	2010–2018	29	2	2016–2017	7	0		
Henrik Dalsgaard	Denmark	RB	2016–2020	26	1	2017–2020	22	1		
Mikkel Damsgaard ‡	Denmark	MF	2020–	45	9	2022–	28	4		
Christian Eriksen	Denmark	AM	2010–	151	46	2022	6	2		
Mathias Jensen ‡	Denmark	CM	2020–	34	1	2020–	34	1		
Mathias Jørgensen	Denmark	CB	2008–	37	2	2023–2024	2	0		
Christian Nørgaard *	Denmark	DM	2020–	41	2	2020–2025	35	1		
Mads Roerslev *	Denmark	RB	2024–	1	0	2024	1	0		
Lasse Vibe	Denmark	FW	2014–2017	11	1	2016–2017	2	0		
Jordan Henderson *	England	DM	2010–	91	3	2025–2026	7	0		
Billy Scott	England	IF	1936	1	0	1936	1	0	(Note: Member of the Brentford Hall of Fame.)	
Les Smith	England	OL	1939	1	0	1939	1	0		
Ivan Toney *	England	FW	2023–	10	1	2023–2024	6	1		
Marcus Forss	Finland	FW	2020–	21	2	2020–2022	14	2		
Daniel O'Shaughnessy	Finland	CB	2016–2024	23	1	2016	2	0		
Vitaly Janelt ‡	Germany	DM	2026–	1	0	2026–	1	0		
Kevin Schade ‡	Germany	LW/FW	2023–	7	0	2023–	5	0		
Tariqe Fosu	Ghana	LW	2020–	4	1	2020	4	1		
Lloyd Owusu	Ghana	FW	2005–2006	2	0	2005–2006	2	0		
Julian Jeanvier	Guinea	CB	2019–	18	0	2019	6	0		
Kolbeinn Finnsson *	Iceland	MF	2019–	14	0	2019	2	0		
Hermann Hreiðarsson	Iceland	CB	1996–2011	89	5	1998–1999	12	1		
Ívar Ingimarsson	Iceland	CB	1998–2007	30	0	2000–2002	3	0		
Ólafur Ingi Skúlason	Iceland	LW	2003–2018	36	1	2006	1	0		
Hákon Valdimarsson ‡	Iceland	GK	2022–	28	0	2024–	21	0		
Saman Ghoddos *	Iran	AM	2017–2026	72	3	2021–2024	30	1		
Joe Connor	Ireland	IR	1903–1904	3	1	1903	2	1		
Tommy Shanks	Ireland	FW	1903–1905	3	0	1905	1	0		
Michael Kayode ‡	Italy	RB	2026–	5	1	2026–	5	1		
Marcus Bean	Jamaica	MF	2011	1	0	2011	1	0		
Deon Burton	Jamaica	FW	1997–2009	56	12	2004	1	0		
Rico Henry ‡	Jamaica	LB	2025–	1	0	2025–	1	0		
Jamie Lawrence	Jamaica	CM	2000–2004	24	1	2004	3	0		
Ethan Pinnock *	Jamaica	CB	2021–	28	0	2021–2026	28	0		
Mamadou Sangaré ‡	Mali	MF	2024–	21	0	2026–	5	0		
John Buttigieg	Malta	SW	1984–2000	97	1	1988–1991	20	0		
Mark Flekken *	Netherlands	GK	2022–	12	0	2023–2024	4	0		
Benjamin Fredrick ‡	Nigeria	RB/CB	2025–	9	0	2025–	9	0		
Frank Onyeka ♠ *	Nigeria	DM	2020–	45	3	2021–2026	44 ♠	3		
Sam Sodje	Nigeria	CB	2005–2009	5	0	2005	1	0		
Jimmy D'Arcy	Northern Ireland	IF	1952–1953	5	1	1952–1953	4	1		
Stuart Dallas	Northern Ireland	LW	2011–2022	62	3	2015	4	1		
Will Grigg *	Northern Ireland	FW	2012–	13	2	2013–2015	5	0		
Kristoffer Ajer ‡	Norway	CB/RB	2018–	63	2	2021–	40	2		
Nathan Collins ‡	Republic of Ireland	CB	2021–	41	3	2023–	26	1		
John Egan *	Republic of Ireland	CB	2017–	41	3	2017	2	0		
Bill Gorman	Republic of Ireland; Ireland	FB	1936–1947; 1946–1948	13 4	0; 0	1939–1947; 1946–1948	3; 4	0; 0	(Note: Capped by Ireland (FAI) and Ireland (IFA).)	
Alan Judge	Republic of Ireland	CM	2016–	9	1	2016–2018	5	1		
Caoimhín Kelleher ‡	Republic of Ireland	GK	2021–	38	0	2025–	16	0		
Romaine Sawyers	Saint Kitts and Nevis	MF	2012–	57	8	2016–2019	8	0		
Julian Charles	Saint Vincent and the Grenadines	FW	2000	2	0	2000	2	0		
Aaron Hickey ‡	Scotland	RB	2022–	27	0	2022–	23	0		
Archie Macaulay	Scotland	IF	1947–1948	7	0	1947	1	0		
David McCulloch	Scotland	CF	1934–1938	7	3	1936–1937	4	0		
Duncan McKenzie	Scotland	WH	1937	1	0	1937	1	0		
Bobby Reid	Scotland	OL	1937–1938	2	0	1937–1938	2	0		
El Hadji Malick Diouf ‡	Senegal	LB	2024–	27	2	2026–	4	1		
Kamohelo Mokotjo	South Africa	CM	2012–	24	0	2017–2019	15	0		
Kim Ji-soo ‡	South Korea	CB	2026–	2	0	2026–	2	0		
David Raya *	Spain	GK	2022–	14	0	2022–2024	6	0		
Pontus Jansson *	Sweden	CB	2012–2020	27	0	2019–2020	5	0		
Halil Dervişoğlu ♠ *	Turkey	FW	2021–	16	6	2021–2022	15	6 ♠		
Yehor Yarmolyuk ‡	Ukraine	CM	2025–	11	0	2025–	11	0		
Les Boulter	Wales	IL	1939	1	1	1939	1	1		
Paul Evans	Wales	MF	2002	2	0	2002	1	0		
Idris Hopkins	Wales	OR	1934–1939	12	2	1934–1939	12	2		
Chris Mepham *	Wales	CB	2018–	57	0	2018	4	0		
Dai Richards	Wales	WH	1931–1938	21	0	1936	4	0		
Fin Stevens *	Wales	RB	2024–	2	0	2024	2	0		
Marley Tavaziva	Zimbabwe	GK	2025–2026	2	0	2025–2026	2	0		

== Other senior international appearances ==
=== Olympic Games/U23 ===
Player	Nationality	Position	Total			Total with Brentford			Ref.
Player	Nationality	Position	Years	Caps	Goals	Years	Caps	Goals	Ref.
Lachlan Brook *	Australia	FW	2019–2024	17	2	2021–2022	8	0	
Lasse Vibe	Denmark	FW	2016	4	0	2016	4	0	
Bill Slater	Great Britain	WH	1952	1	1	1952	1	1	
Ibrahima Sonko	Senegal	CB	n/a	n/a	n/a	2003	1	0	
Kim Ji-soo ‡	South Korea	CB	2023–	12	1	2023–	12	1	
Yehor Yarmolyuk ‡	Ukraine	CM	2024–	4	1	2024–	4	1	
Julian Eyestone ‡	United States	GK	2026–	1	0	2026–	1	0	

=== B international ===
Player	Nationality	Position	Total			Total with Brentford			Ref
Player	Nationality	Position	Years	Caps	Goals	Years	Caps	Goals	Ref
Ron Greenwood	England	CB	1952	1	0	1952	1	0	

=== Wartime and Victory internationals ===
Player	Nationality	Position	Total			Total with Brentford			Ref.
Player	Nationality	Position	Years	Caps	Goals	Years	Caps	Goals	Ref.
Patsy Hendren	England	OL	1919	1	0	1919	1	0	
Les Smith	England	OL	1939–1945	11	3	1939–1945	11	3	
Joe Crozier	Scotland	GK	1943–1944	3	0	1943–1944	3	0	
Idris Hopkins	Wales	OR	1939–1944	9	1	1939–1944	9	1	

=== Amateur ===
Player	Nationality	Position	Total			Total with Brentford			Ref.
Player	Nationality	Position	Years	Caps	Goals	Years	Caps	Goals	Ref.
Alec Barclay	England	HB	1913–1914	3	0	1913–1914	3	0	
Jackie Burns	England	LH	1930–1935	16	3	1931–1935	12	3	
Maurice Edelston	England	IF	1937–1947	8	7	1939	3	4	
Vivian Gibbins	England	FW	1924–1932	12	7	1932	2	0	
Jackie Gibbons ♦	England	IF	1938–1939	6	6	1939	3	3	
Terry Robinson	England	OF	1956–1957	10	0	1956–1957	4	0	
Bill Slater	England	WH	1950–1953	20	7	1952	5	0	
Kevin O'Flanagan	Republic of Ireland	OL	1949–1950	2	1	1950	1	1	
Martin Woosnam	Wales	HB	1929	1	0	1929	1	0	

=== Representative ===
Player	Team	Nationality	Position	Total			Total with Brentford			Notes	Ref.
Player	Team	Nationality	Position	Years	Caps	Goals	Years	Caps	Goals	Notes	Ref.
Jackie Gibbons ♦	Football Association XI	England	IF	1939	n/a	n/a	1939	n/a	n/a		
Johnny Rainford	Football League Third Division South	England	IF	1955	1	1	1955	1	1		
Archie Mitchell ♦	Football League XI	England	CH	1921	1	0	1921	1	0		
Sam Tillen	Football League XI	England	LB/LM	2006	1	0	2006	1	0	(Note: Match played as an U21 fixture.)	
Jimmy D'Arcy	Irish Football Association XI	Northern Ireland	IF	1953	n/a	n/a	1953	n/a	n/a		
Steve Buxton	London XI	England	LB	1910	1	0	1910	1	0		
John Christie	London XI	Scotland	RB/LH	1910	1	0	1910	1	0		
Ken Coote	London XI	England	FB	1956–1958	3	0	1956–1958	3	0		
Patsy Hendren	Southern League XI	England	OL	1919	1	0	1919	1	0		
Ted Price	Southern League XI	England	GK	1919	1	0	1919	1	0		
Geordie Reid	Southern League XI	Scotland	IL/CF	1910	2	2	1910	2	2		

=== Other ===
Player	Nationality	Position	Total			Total with Brentford			Ref.
Player	Nationality	Position	Years	Caps	Goals	Years	Caps	Goals	Ref.
Archie Macaulay	Great Britain	IF	1947	1	0	1947	1	0	
Terry Robinson	Great Britain	OF	1956	8	0	1956	8	0	

== Youth international players ==
=== U21 ===
Player	Nationality	Position	Notes	Ref.
Roy Syla	Albania	CM		
Jannik Schuster ‡	Austria	CB		
Nick Tsaroulla *	Cyprus	LB		
Jan Žambůrek *	Czech Republic	CM	(Note: Also capped by Czech Republic at Czech Republic U19 and U18 level while a Brentford player.)	
Mads Bidstrup *	Denmark	DM		
Luka Racic *	Denmark	CB	(Note: Also capped by Denmark at U20 level while a Brentford player.)	
Mads Roerslev *	Denmark	RB		
Mads Bech Sørensen *	Denmark	CB	(Note: Also capped by Denmark at U20 and U19 level while a Brentford player.)	
Josh Dasilva ‡	England	AM	(Note: Also capped by England at U20 level while a Brentford player.)	
Nicky Forster ♦	England	FW		
Ezri Konsa *	England	CB		
Marcus Forss	Finland	FW	(Note: Also capped by Finland at U19 level while a Brentford player.)	
Daniel O'Shaughnessy	Finland	CB	(Note: Also capped by Finland at U20 level while a Brentford player.)	
Jaakko Oksanen *	Finland	MF		
Bryan Mbeumo *	France	W/FW		
Vitaly Janelt ‡	Germany	DM		
Kevin Schade ‡	Germany	LW/FW		
Kolbeinn Finnsson *	Iceland	MF		
Patrik Gunnarsson *	Iceland	GK	(Note: Also capped by Iceland at U19 level while a Brentford player.)	
Michael Kayode ‡	Italy	RB		
David Titov	Latvia	FB	(Note: Also capped by Latvia at U19 level while a Brentford player.)	
Antoni Milambo ‡	Netherlands	AM		
Ryan Blake	Northern Ireland	LB	(Note: Also capped by Northern Ireland at U19 level while a Brentford player.)	
Stuart Dallas	Northern Ireland	LW		
Gareth Graham	Northern Ireland	MF/RB		
Alan Julian	Northern Ireland	GK	(Note: Also capped by Northern Ireland at U19 and U18 level while a Brentford player.)	
Danny Boxall	Republic of Ireland	RB		
Canice Carroll	Republic of Ireland	CB		
Tony Folan	Republic of Ireland	LW		
Alex Gilbert *	Republic of Ireland	AM		
Conor McManus *	Republic of Ireland	LB		
Kevin O'Connor	Republic of Ireland	U		
Martin Rowlands	Republic of Ireland	MF		
Jay Tabb	Republic of Ireland	AM/LW		
Theo Archibald *	Scotland	RW		
Jim McNichol	Scotland	DF		
Halil Dervişoğlu *	Turkey	FW		
Yunus Emre Konak ‡	Turkey	DM		
Yehor Yarmolyuk ‡	Ukraine	CM	(Note: Also capped by Ukraine at U19 level while a Brentford player.)	
Julian Eyestone ‡	United States	GK	(Note: Also capped by the United States at U20 level while a Brentford player.)	
Joe Adams	Wales	LW	(Note: Also capped by Wales at U20 and U19 level while a Brentford player.)	
Cole Dasilva	Wales	FB		
Chris Mepham *	Wales	CB	(Note: Also capped by Wales at U20 level while a Brentford player.)	
Gary Roberts	Wales	W		
Nathan Shepperd	Wales	GK		
Matt Somner	Wales	DF		
Fin Stevens *	Wales	RB		

=== U20 ===
Player	Nationality	Position	Notes	Ref.
Archie Trimboli ‡	Australia	RB	(Note: Also capped by Australia at U17 while a Brentford player.)	
Gustavo Nunes ‡	Brazil	LW		
Justin Shaibu	Denmark	FW		
Benjamin Arthur ‡	England	CB	(Note: Also capped by England at U19 while a Brentford player.)	
Ellery Balcombe ‡	England	GK	(Note: Also capped by England at U19 and U18 level while a Brentford player.)	
Matthew Cox ‡	England	GK	(Note: Also capped by England at U19 level while a Brentford player.)	
Romelle Donovan ‡	England	AM		
Rico Henry ‡	England	LB		
Paris Maghoma *	England	CM		
Jayden Meghoma ‡	England	LB	(Note: Also capped by England at U19 level while a Brentford player.)	
Moses Odubajo *	England	RW/RB		
Michael Olakigbe ‡	England	LW		
Daniel Oyegoke *	England	RB		
Raphaël Calvet	France	CB		
Nik Tzanev *	New Zealand	GK		

=== U19 ===
Player	Nationality	Position	Notes	Ref.
Luka Bentt ‡	Belgium	MF		
Kaye Furo ‡	Belgium	FW		
Gustav Mogensen	Denmark	FW	(Note: Also capped by Denmark at U18 level while a Brentford player.)	
Lukas Talbro	Denmark	DF	(Note: Also capped by Denmark at U18 level while a Brentford player.)	
Matas Klimas ‡	Lithuania	DF	(Note: Also capped by Lithuania at U18 level while a Brentford player.)	
Audrius Laučys	Lithuania	CB		
Stefan Tomasevic	Montenegro	DF		
Coran Madden ‡	Northern Ireland	FW	(Note: Also capped by Northern Ireland at U17 level while a Brentford player.)	
Ben Wilson ‡	Northern Ireland	MF		
Val Adedokun ‡	Republic of Ireland	LB		
Ethan Laidlaw *	Scotland	FW		
Jonny Mitchell	Scotland	DM		
Simon Andersson	Sweden	GK	(Note: Also capped by Sweden at U17 level while a Brentford player.)	
Kiefer Gorman ‡	Sweden	MF		
Fredrik Hammar *	Sweden	MF		
Iwan Morgan *	Wales	FW		

=== U18/Youth ===
Player	Nationality	Position	Notes	Ref.
Nikola Tavares *	Croatia	CB		
Ashley Bayes	England	GK		
Paul Buckle	England	MF		
Gerry Cakebread	England	GK		
Roy Cotton	England	FW		
Tamer Fernandes	England	GK		
Marcus Gayle	England	LW/FW		
Gary Huxley	England	LW		
Danis Salman	England	DF		
Gary Simons	England	n/a		
Glenn Brophy	Republic of Ireland	n/a		
Stephen Hendry	Scotland	MF		
Luke Evans	Wales	DF		
Matt Flitter	Wales	DF		
Jai Bansoodeb ‡	United States	AM	(Note: Also capped by United States at U17 level while a Brentford player.)	

=== U17 ===
Player	Nationality	Position	Ref.
Jai Nwosu ‡	England	FW	
Joshua Bohui	England	FW	
Lachlan MacIntyre ‡	New Zealand	n/a	
Adrian Moyles	Republic of Ireland	FB	
Chris Dickson	Scotland	DF	
Lionel Stone	Scotland	DF	

=== U16/Schoolboys ===
Player	Nationality	Position	Ref.
Alan Bassham	England	RB	
Roy Hart	England	CH	
Ian Poveda	England	W	
Hatim Belhadj ‡	Morocco	LW	
Tom Field *	Republic of Ireland	LB	
Julius Fenn-Evans	Wales	FW	

=== U15 ===
Player	Nationality	Position	Ref.
Romayn Pennant	Scotland	FB	
Dylan Evans	Wales	DF	

== Awards ==
- 2021 UEFA European U21 Championship Squad of the Tournament: Mads Bech Sørensen
- 2022 UEFA European U19 Championship Team of the Tournament: Matthew Cox
- 2023 Africa Cup of Nations Team of the Tournament: Yoane Wissa
