= 2025–26 Brentford F.C. season =

English football team season

Brentford
2025–26 season
- Owner: Matthew Benham
- Chairman: Cliff Crown
- Head coach: Keith Andrews
- Stadium: Brentford Community Stadium
- Premier League: 9th
- FA Cup: Fifth round
- EFL Cup: Quarter-finals
- Top goalscorer: League: Igor Thiago (22); All: Igor Thiago (25)
- Highest home attendance: 17,224 (v. Arsenal, Premier League, 12 February 2026)
- Lowest home attendance: 16,795 (v. Chelsea, Premier League, 13 September 2025)
- Average home league attendance: 17,132
- Biggest win: 5–0 v. Grimsby Town (A); EFL Cup, 28 October 2025
- Biggest defeat: 0–3 v. Manchester City (A); Premier League, 9 May 2026
Home colours	Away colours	Third colours

The 2025–26 season was the 136th season in the history of Brentford Football Club, and the club's fifth consecutive season in the Premier League. In addition to the domestic league, the club also participated in the FA Cup and the EFL Cup.

Prior to the season starting, Thomas Frank departed as head coach after seven years to join Tottenham Hotspur. Keith Andrews was then later appointed as the new head coach. On 2 August, Nathan Collins was named captain, following the departure of previous captain Christian Nørgaard to Arsenal.

This was the first season since 2018–19 without Christian Nørgaard and Bryan Mbeumo.

== First team squad ==
Players' ages are as of the opening day of the 2025–26 season.

No.	Player	Nationality	Position	Date of birth (age)	Signed from	Signed in	Notes
Goalkeepers
1	Caoimhín Kelleher	(Republic of Ireland)	GK	23 November 1998 (aged 26)	Liverpool	2025	
12	Hákon Valdimarsson	(Iceland)	GK	13 October 2001 (aged 23)	IF Elfsborg	2024	
13	Matthew Cox	(England)	GK	2 May 2003 (aged 22)	AFC Wimbledon	2021	Loaned to Shrewsbury Town
31	Ellery Balcombe	(England)	GK	15 October 1999 (aged 25)	Academy	2016	
41	Julian Eyestone	(United States)	GK	21 April 2006 (aged 19)	Unattached	2024	
Defenders
2	Aaron Hickey	(Scotland)	RB / LB	10 June 2002 (aged 23)	Bologna	2022	
3	Rico Henry	(Jamaica)	LB	8 July 1997 (aged 28)	Walsall	2016	
4	Sepp van den Berg	(Netherlands)	CB / RB	20 December 2001 (aged 23)	Liverpool	2024	
5	Ethan Pinnock	(Jamaica)	CB	29 May 1993 (aged 32)	Barnsley	2019	
20	Kristoffer Ajer	(Norway)	CB / RB	17 April 1998 (aged 27)	Celtic	2021	
21	Jayden Meghoma	(England)	LB	28 June 2006 (aged 19)	Southampton	2024	Loaned to Rangers
22	Nathan Collins (c)	(Republic of Ireland)	CB	30 April 2001 (aged 24)	Wolverhampton Wanderers	2023	
33	Michael Kayode	(Italy)	RB	10 July 2004 (aged 21)	Fiorentina	2025	
43	Benjamin Arthur	(England)	CB	9 October 2005 (aged 19)	Peterborough United	2023	Loaned to Celtic
49	Ollie Shield	(England)	RB / RW	25 September 2006 (aged 18)	Academy	2023	
50	Josh Stephenson	(England)	CB	15 February 2006 (aged 19)	Millwall	2024	
51	Conor McManus	(Republic of Ireland)	LB / CB	16 June 2004 (aged 21)	Bray Wanderers	2023	
—	Kim Ji-soo	(South Korea)	CB	24 December 2004 (aged 20)	Seongnam	2023	Loaned to 1. FC Kaiserslautern
Midfielders
6	Jordan Henderson	(England)	DM	17 June 1990 (aged 35)	Ajax	2025	
8	Mathias Jensen	(Denmark)	CM	1 January 1996 (aged 29)	Celta Vigo	2019	
10	Josh Dasilva	(England)	AM	23 October 1998 (aged 26)	Arsenal	2018	
14	Fábio Carvalho	(Portugal)	AM	30 August 2002 (aged 22)	Liverpool	2024	
15	Frank Onyeka	(Nigeria)	DM	1 January 1998 (aged 27)	Midtjylland	2021	Loaned to Coventry City
17	Antoni Milambo	(Netherlands)	AM	3 March 2005 (aged 20)	Feyenoord	2025	
18	Yehor Yarmolyuk	(Ukraine)	CM	1 March 2004 (aged 21)	Dnipro-1	2022	
24	Mikkel Damsgaard	(Denmark)	AM	3 July 2000 (aged 25)	Sampdoria	2022	
26	Yunus Emre Konak	(Turkey)	DM	10 January 2006 (aged 19)	Sivasspor	2024	Loaned to Oxford United
27	Vitaly Janelt	(Germany)	DM	10 May 1998 (aged 27)	VfL Bochum	2020	
45	Romelle Donovan	(England)	AM	30 November 2006 (aged 18)	Birmingham City	2025	
48	Luka Bentt	(Belgium)	MF	1 October 2007 (aged 17)	Academy	2024	
52	Riley Owen	(England)	CM	24 August 2005 (aged 19)	Tottenham Hotspur	2023	
—	Ryan Trevitt	(England)	MF	12 March 2003 (aged 22)	Leatherhead Youth	2021	Loaned to Wigan Athletic
Attackers
7	Kevin Schade	(Germany)	LW / FW	27 November 2001 (aged 23)	SC Freiburg	2023	
9	Igor Thiago	(Brazil)	FW	26 June 2001 (aged 24)	Club Brugge	2024	
11	Reiss Nelson	(England)	W	10 December 1999 (aged 25)	Arsenal	2025	On loan from Arsenal
19	Dango Ouattara	(Burkina Faso)	RW	11 February 2002 (aged 23)	Bournemouth	2025	
23	Keane Lewis-Potter	(England)	LW / LB	22 February 2001 (aged 24)	Hull City	2022	
39	Gustavo Nunes	(Brazil)	LW	20 November 2005 (aged 19)	Grêmio	2024	Loaned to Swansea City
47	Kaye Furo	(Belgium)	FW	6 February 2007 (aged 18)	Club Brugge	2026	
Players who left the club mid-season
~~11~~	Yoane Wissa	(Democratic Republic of the Congo)	FW	3 September 1996 (aged 28)	Lorient	2021	Transferred to Newcastle United
25	Myles Peart-Harris	(England)	AM	18 September 2002 (aged 22)	Chelsea	2021	Transferred to Oxford United
30	Mads Roerslev	(Denmark)	RB	24 June 1999 (aged 26)	Copenhagen	2019	Transferred to Southampton
32	Paris Maghoma	(England)	CM	8 May 2001 (aged 24)	Tottenham Hotspur	2020	Transferred to Norwich City

== Transfers ==
=== Transfers in ===
Date	Position	Nationality	Player	From	Fee	Ref.
1 July 2025 (Note: Donovan's transfer was announced on 2 June 2025 and his contract commenced on 1 July 2025.)	AM	(England)	Romelle Donovan	(England) Birmingham City	£3,000,000	
1 July 2025 (Note: Kayode's transfer was announced on 28 May 2025 and his contract commenced on 1 July 2025.)	RB	(Italy)	Michael Kayode	(Italy) Fiorentina	£17,500,000	
1 July 2025 (Note: Kelleher's transfer was announced on 3 June 2025 and his contract commenced on 1 July 2025.)	GK	(Republic of Ireland)	Caoimhín Kelleher	(England) Liverpool	£12,500,000	
1 July 2025 (Note: Mawene's transfer was announced on 19 June 2025 and his contract commenced on 1 July 2025.)	AM	(England)	Theo Mawene	(England) Preston North End	Undisclosed	
3 July 2025	AM	(Netherlands)	Antoni Milambo	(Netherlands) Feyenoord	£16,000,000	
15 July 2025	DM	(England)	Jordan Henderson	(Netherlands) Ajax	Free transfer	
21 July 2025	AM	(England)	Kyrie Pierre	(England) Aston Villa	Free transfer	
16 August 2025	RW	(Burkina Faso)	Dango Ouattara	(England) Bournemouth	£42,500,000	
8 September 2025	RB	(England)	Maxwell McKnight	Free agent	Free transfer	
8 September 2025	FB	(Wales)	Luca Picotto	Free agent	Free transfer	
11 January 2026	FW	(Belgium)	Kaye Furo	(Belgium) Club Brugge	£8,700,000	

=== Transfers out ===
Date	Position	Nationality	Player	To	Fee	Ref.
30 June 2025	MF	(England)	Yaw Agyei	(Czech Republic) 1. FC Slovácko	Released	
30 June 2025	MF	(England)	Beaux Booth	(England) Sholing	Released	
30 June 2025	FB	(England)	Max Dickov	(England) Mansfield Town	Released	
30 June 2025 (Note: Flekken's transfer was announced on 3 June 2025 and his Bayer Leverkusen contract commenced on 1 July 2025.)	GK	(Netherlands)	Mark Flekken	(Germany) Bayer Leverkusen	£8,000,000	
30 June 2025	CB	(England)	Ben Mee	(England) Sheffield United	Released	
30 June 2025	CB	(England)	Kerron Samuels	Free agent	Released	
30 June 2025	CM	(England)	Max Wilcox	Free agent	Released	
30 June 2025	LB	(England)	Vonnté Williams	(England) Walton & Hersham	Released	
30 June 2025	GK	(England)	Ben Winterbottom	(England) Barrow	Released	
4 July 2025	FW	(England)	Ashley Hay	(Scotland) Dundee	Undisclosed	
10 July 2025	DM	(Denmark)	Christian Nørgaard	(England) Arsenal	£15,000,000	
21 July 2025	RW	(Cameroon)	Bryan Mbeumo	(England) Manchester United	£65,000,000	
22 July 2025	W	(England)	Emeka Peters	(Netherlands) Feyenoord	Undisclosed	
21 August 2025	RB	(Denmark)	Mads Roerslev	(England) Southampton	Undisclosed	
1 September 2025	FW	(Democratic Republic of the Congo)	Yoane Wissa	(England) Newcastle United	£55,000,000	
9 January 2026	AM	(England)	Myles Peart-Harris	(England) Oxford United	Undisclosed	
15 January 2026	CB	(England)	Chanse Headman	(England) Harrogate Town	Free transfer	
26 January 2026	CM	(England)	Paris Maghoma	(England) Norwich City	Undisclosed	

=== Loans in ===
Date	Position	Nationality	Player	From	Date until	Ref.
1 September 2025	W	(England)	Reiss Nelson	(England) Arsenal	End of season	
2 February 2026	DF	(England)	Joseph Wheeler-Henry	(England) Chelsea	End of season	

=== Loans out ===
Date	Position	Nationality	Player	To	Date until	Ref.
1 July 2025 (Note: Brierley's loan was announced on 26 June 2025 and commenced on 1 July 2025.)	CM	(England)	Ethan Brierley	(England) Exeter City	End of season	
1 July 2025 (Note: Yogane's loan was announced on 30 June 2025 and commenced on 1 July 2025.)	LW	(England)	Tony Yogane	(Scotland) Dundee	End of season	
16 July 2025	MF	(England)	Ben Krauhaus	(England) Bromley	End of season	
22 July 2025	CB	(South Korea)	Kim Ji-soo	(Germany) 1. FC Kaiserslautern	End of season	
25 July 2025	RB	(Nigeria)	Benjamin Fredrick	(Belgium) Dender	End of season	
31 July 2025	CM	(England)	Ryan Trevitt	(England) Wigan Athletic	End of season	
17 August 2025	LB	(England)	Jayden Meghoma	(Scotland) Rangers	End of season	
5 December 2025	CB	(England)	Chanse Headman	(England) Maidenhead United	3 January 2025	
1 January 2026	FW	(Wales)	Iwan Morgan	(England) Shrewsbury Town	End of season	
2 January 2026	LW	(England)	Michael Olakigbe	(England) Swindon Town	End of season	
15 January 2026	GK	(England)	Matthew Cox	(England) Shrewsbury Town	End of season	
15 January 2026	DM	(Turkey)	Yunus Emre Konak	(England) Oxford United	End of season	
22 January 2026	LW	(Brazil)	Gustavo Nunes	(Wales) Swansea City	End of season	
2 February 2026	CB	(England)	Benjamin Arthur	(Scotland) Celtic	End of season	
2 February 2026	CM	(Nigeria)	Frank Onyeka	(England) Coventry City	End of season	

== Pre-season and friendlies ==
Win Draw Loss Fixtures

25 July 2025 Friendly	Gil Vicente	1–1	Brentford	Barcelos
19:30 WEST	Pablo 10'	Report	Thiago 18'; Milambo (yellow card) 70'	Stadium: Estádio Cidade de Barcelos; Referee: Jose Armando Torres Bessa

2 August 2025 Friendly	Queens Park Rangers	0–1	Brentford	Shepherd's Bush
15:00 BST		Report	Collins 2'	Stadium: Loftus Road; Attendance: 9,070; Referee: Gavin Ward

8 August 2025 Friendly	Brentford	2–2	Borussia Mönchengladbach	Brentford
19:30 BST	Carvalho 69'; Damsgaard 70'	Report	Ranos 30'; Honorat 86'	Stadium: Brentford Community Stadium; Attendance: 11,082; Referee: Simon Hooper

9 August 2025 Friendly	Brentford XI	1–2	Borussia Mönchengladbach	Osterley
	Donovan 19'	Report	Hack 21'; Neuhaus 40'	Stadium: Jersey Road; Attendance: 0

18 November 2025 Friendly	Brentford	2–0	AFC Wimbledon	Brentford
	Jensen; Peart-Harris	Report		Stadium: Brentford Community Stadium; Attendance: 0

== Competitions ==
=== Overall record ===
Competition	First match	Last match	Starting round	Final position	Record							
Competition	First match	Last match	Starting round	Final position	Pld	W	D	L	GF	GA	GD	Win %
Premier League	17 August 2025	24 May 2026	Matchday 1	9th	38	14	11	13	55	52	+3	36.84
FA Cup	10 January 2026	9 March 2026	Third round	Fifth round	3	2	1	0	5	2	+3	66.67
EFL Cup	26 August 2025	17 December 2025	Second round	Quarter-finals	4	2	1	1	8	3	+5	50.00
Total					45	18	13	14	68	57	+11	40.00

Source: Soccerway

=== Premier League ===
==== League table ====
Pos	Team	Pld	W	D	L	GF	GA	GD	Pts	Qualification or relegation
7	Sunderland	38	14	12	12	42	48	−6	54	Qualification for the Europa League league phase (Note: Since the winners of the 2025–26 FA Cup and 2025–26 EFL Cup, Manchester City, qualified for the Champions League by league position, the spot reserved for the FA Cup winners (Europa League league phase) was passed to the seventh-placed team, and the spot reserved for the EFL Cup winners (Conference League play-off round) was passed to the eighth-placed team.)
8	Brighton & Hove Albion	38	14	11	13	52	46	+6	53	Qualification for the Conference League play-off round
9	Brentford	38	14	11	13	55	52	+3	53	
10	Chelsea	38	14	10	14	58	52	+6	52	
11	Fulham	38	15	7	16	47	51	−4	52	

Source: Premier League
Rules for classification: 1) Points; 2) Goal difference; 3) Goals scored; 4) If the champions, relegated teams or qualified teams for UEFA competitions cannot be determined by rules 1 to 3, rules 4.1 to 4.3 are applied – 4.1) Points gained in head-to-head record between such teams; 4.2) Away goals scored in head-to-head record between such teams; 4.3) Play-offs

==== Results summary ====
Overall								Home						Away					
Pld	W	D	L	GF	GA	GD	Pts	W	D	L	GF	GA	GD	W	D	L	GF	GA	GD
38	14	11	13	55	52	+3	53	8	8	3	33	21	+12	6	3	10	22	31	−9

Source: Soccerway

==== Results by round ====
Round	1	2	3	4	5	6	7	8	9	10	11	12	13	14	15	16	17	18	19	20	21	22	23	24	25	26	27	28	29	30	31	32	33	34	35	36	37	38
Ground	A	H	A	H	A	H	H	A	H	A	H	A	H	A	A	H	A	H	H	A	H	A	H	A	A	H	H	A	A	H	A	H	H	A	H	A	H	A
Result	L	W	L	D	L	W	L	W	W	L	W	L	W	L	L	D	W	W	D	W	W	L	L	W	W	D	L	W	D	D	D	D	D	L	W	L	D	D
Position	17	10	15	12	17	13	16	13	11	12	12	13	10	13	14	15	12	8	9	7	5	7	8	7	7	7	7	7	7	7	7	7	7	9	7	8	9	9
Points	0	3	3	4	4	7	7	10	13	13	16	16	19	19	19	20	23	26	27	30	33	33	33	36	39	40	40	43	44	45	46	47	48	48	51	51	52	53

Source: Premier League
A = Away; H = Home; W = Win; D = Draw; L = Loss; P = Postponed

==== Matches ====
Win Draw Loss Fixtures

17 August 2025 1	Nottingham Forest	3–1	Brentford	West Bridgford
14:00 BST	Wood 5', 45+2'; Ndoye 42'; Williams (yellow card) 53'	Report	Collins (yellow card) 52'; Thiago 78' (pen.); Hickey (yellow card) 90'	Stadium: City Ground; Attendance: 29,949; Referee: Peter Bankes
Note: Fixture was initially scheduled for 16 August, but was moved for live Sky Sports broadcast.

23 August 2025 2	Brentford	1–0	Aston Villa	Brentford
15:00 BST	Ouattara 12'; Kelleher (yellow card) 55'	Report	Onana (yellow card) 57'; Bogarde (yellow card) 84'	Stadium: Brentford Community Stadium; Attendance: 16,838; Referee: Tony Harrington

30 August 2025 3	Sunderland	2–1	Brentford	Sunderland
15:00 BST	Mandava (yellow card) 57'; Diarra (yellow card) 58'; Le Fée 82' (pen.); Xhaka (yellow card) 90+4'; Isidor 90+6'	Report	Schade (penalty missed) 59'; Thiago (yellow card) 61', (goal) 77'; Henry (yellow card) 80'	Stadium: Stadium of Light; Attendance: 46,267; Referee: Anthony Taylor

13 September 2025 4	Brentford	2–2	Chelsea	Brentford
20:00 BST	Thiago (yellow card) 8'; Schade 35'; Yarmolyuk (yellow card) 64'; Pinnock (yellow card) 82'; Carvalho 90+3'	Report	Hato (yellow card) 30'; Palmer 61'; Caicedo 85'; George (yellow card) 90+1'	Stadium: Brentford Community Stadium; Attendance: 16,795; Referee: Stuart Attwell
Note: Live on Sky Sports

20 September 2025 5	Fulham	3–1	Brentford	Fulham
20:00 BST	Iwobi 38'; Wilson 40'; King (yellow card) 43'; Pinnock 50' (o.g.); Lukić (yellow card) 53'; Leno (yellow card) 81'; Kevin (yellow card) 90+3'	Report	Damsgaard 20'; Collins (yellow card) 69'	Stadium: Craven Cottage; Attendance: 26,113; Referee: Michael Oliver
Note: Live on Sky Sports

27 September 2025 6	Brentford	3–1	Manchester United	Brentford
12:30 BST	Thiago 8', 20'; Collins (yellow card) 72'; Schade (yellow card) 80'; Jensen 90+5'	Report	Šeško 26'; Fernandes (yellow card) 55', (penalty missed) 76'; Dorgu (yellow card) 84'	Stadium: Brentford Community Stadium; Attendance: 17,193; Referee: Craig Pawson
Note: Fixture was initially scheduled for a 15:00 kick-off, but was moved for live TNT Sports broadcast.

5 October 2025 7	Brentford	0–1	Manchester City	Brentford
16:30 BST	Schade (yellow card) 45+1'; Henderson (yellow card) 70'; Ouattara (yellow card) 84'	Report	Haaland 9'; Nunes (yellow card) 77'; O'Reilly (yellow card) 83'	Stadium: Brentford Community Stadium; Attendance: 17,140; Referee: Darren England
Note: Fixture was initially scheduled for 4 October, but was moved for live Sky Sports broadcast.

20 October 2025 8	West Ham United	0–2	Brentford	Stratford
20:00 BST	Summerville (yellow card) 67'	Report	Thiago 43'; Henderson (yellow card) 89'; Jensen 90+4'	Stadium: London Stadium; Attendance: 62,452; Referee: Andrew Madley
Note: Fixture was initially scheduled for 18 October, but was moved for live Sky Sports broadcast.

25 October 2025 9	Brentford	3–2	Liverpool	Brentford
20:00 BST	Ouattara 5'; Schade 45', (yellow card) 76'; Thiago 60' (pen.), (yellow card) 90+10'; Lewis-Potter (yellow card) 90+4'	Report	Kerkez (yellow card) 33', (goal) 45+5'; Salah (yellow card) 57', (goal) 89'	Stadium: Brentford Community Stadium; Attendance: 17,214; Referee: Tim Robinson
Note: Fixture was initially scheduled for a 15:00 kick-off, but was moved for live Sky Sports broadcast. Simon Hooper began the match as referee, but suffered a hamstring injury during the first half and was replaced on the pitch for the second half by fourth official Tim Robinson.

1 November 2025 10	Crystal Palace	2–0	Brentford	Selhurst
15:00 GMT	Mateta 30'; Collins 51' (o.g.)	Report	Schade (yellow card) 34'; Henderson (yellow card) 78'; Collins (yellow card) 84'	Stadium: Selhurst Park; Attendance: 25,083; Referee: Peter Bankes

9 November 2025 11	Brentford	3–1	Newcastle United	Brentford
14:00 GMT	Schade 56'; Ouattara (yellow card) 61'; Thiago 78' (pen.), 90+5'; Kayode (yellow card) 87'	Report	Barnes 27'; Burn (yellow card) 49' (yellow-red card) 73'; Trippier (yellow card) 90+7'	Stadium: Brentford Community Stadium; Attendance: 17,207; Referee: Stuart Attwell
Note: Fixture was initially scheduled for 8 November, but was rescheduled for live Sky Sports broadcasting.

22 November 2025 12	Brighton & Hove Albion	2–1	Brentford	Brighton and Hove
15:00 GMT	Boscagli (yellow card) 15'; Gómez (yellow card) 64'; Welbeck 71'; Hinshelwood 84'; Gruda (yellow card) 90+1'; Verbruggen (yellow card) 90+4'	Report	Thiago 29' (pen.), (penalty missed) 90+4'; Oattara (yellow card) 36'; Janelt (yellow card) 90+5'	Stadium: Falmer Stadium; Attendance: 31,358; Referee: Chris Kavanagh

29 November 2025 13	Brentford	3–1	Burnley	Brentford
15:00 GMT	Thiago 81' (pen.), 86'; Ouattara 90+2'	Report	Mejbri (yellow card) 16'; Tuanzebe (yellow card) 77'; Flemming 85' (pen.)	Stadium: Brentford Community Stadium; Attendance: 17,176; Referee: Sam Barrott

3 December 2025 14	Arsenal	2–0	Brentford	Holloway
19:30 GMT	Merino 11'; Saka 90+1'	Report	Yarmolyuk (yellow card) 65'	Stadium: Emirates Stadium; Attendance: 60,110; Referee: Tony Harrington
Note: Fixture was initially scheduled for a 20:00 kick-off, but was moved for live Sky Sports broadcasting.

6 December 2025 15	Tottenham Hotspur	2–0	Brentford	Tottenham
15:00 GMT	Richarlison 25'; Romero (yellow card) 31'; Simons 43'; Porro (yellow card) 47'; Gray (yellow card) 77'	Report	Kayode (yellow card) 29'; Ajer (yellow card) 45'; Schade (yellow card) 60'; Yarmolyuk (yellow card) 72'	Stadium: Tottenham Hotspur Stadium; Attendance: 60,759; Referee: Robert Jones

14 December 2025 16	Brentford	1–1	Leeds United	Brentford
16:30 GMT	Henderson 70'	Report	Calvert-Lewin 82'	Stadium: Brentford Community Stadium; Attendance: 17,159; Referee: John Brooks
Note: Fixture was initially scheduled for 13 December, but was moved for live Sky Sports broadcasting.

20 December 2025 17	Wolverhampton Wanderers	0–2	Brentford	Wolverhampton
15:00 GMT	João Gomes (yellow card) 24'; Hwang Hee-chan (yellow card) 44'; Larsen (penalty missed) 89'	Report	Van den Berg (yellow card) 19'; Kayode (yellow card) 44'; Lewis-Potter 63', 83'; Henry (yellow card) 72'; Janelt (yellow card) 90'	Stadium: Molineux Stadium; Attendance: 27,662; Referee: Matt Donahue

27 December 2025 18	Brentford	4–1	Bournemouth	Brentford
15:00 GMT	Schade 7', 51', 90+6'; Petrović 39' (o.g.); Jensen (yellow card) 75'; Kayode (yellow card) 82'	Report	Semenyo 75'; Kluivert (yellow card) 82'; Tavernier (yellow card) 90+1'	Stadium: Brentford Community Stadium; Attendance: 17,152; Referee: Peter Bankes

1 January 2026 19	Brentford	0–0	Tottenham Hotspur	Brentford
20:00 GMT	Henderson (yellow card) 58'	Report	Palhinha (yellow card) 60'; Vicario (yellow card) 69'	Stadium: Brentford Community Stadium; Attendance: 17,141; Referee: Andrew Madley
Note: Fixture was initially scheduled for 30 December, but was moved for live Sky Sports broadcasting.

4 January 2026 20	Everton	2–4	Brentford	Liverpool
15:00 GMT	Beto 66'; Barry 90+1'	Report	Thiago 11', 51', 88'; Yarmoliuk (yellow card) 31'; Kayode (yellow card) 39'; Collins 50'	Stadium: Hill Dickinson Stadium; Attendance: 52,514; Referee: Anthony Taylor
Note: Fixture was initially scheduled for 3 January, but was moved for due to the Tottenham rearrangement.

7 January 2026 21	Brentford	3–0	Sunderland	Brentford
19:30 GMT	Thiago 30', 65', (yellow card) 43'; Janelt (yellow card) 63'; Yarmoliuk 73'	Report	Hume (yellow card) 45'; Le Fée (penalty missed) 60'	Stadium: Brentford Community Stadium; Attendance: 17,016; Referee: Matt Donohue
Note: Fixture was initially scheduled for a 20:00 kick-off, but was moved for live Sky Sports broadcasting.

17 January 2026 22	Chelsea	2–0	Brentford	Fulham
15:00 GMT	João Pedro 26'; Cucurella (yellow card) 67'; Palmer 76' (pen.), (yellow card) 90+1'; Fofana (yellow card) 83'	Report	Schade (yellow card) 36'; Janelt (yellow card) 45+3'	Stadium: Stamford Bridge; Attendance: 39,704; Referee: John Brooks

25 January 2026 23	Brentford	0–2	Nottingham Forest	Brentford
14:00 GMT	Yarmolyuk (yellow card) 66'	Report	Igor Jesus 12'; Awoniyi 79'	Stadium: Brentford Community Stadium; Attendance: 17,134; Referee: Sam Barrott
Note: Fixture was initially scheduled for 24 January, but was rescheduled due to Forest's UEFA Europa League involvements on the preceding Thursday.

1 February 2026 24	Aston Villa	0–1	Brentford	Birmingham
14:00 GMT	Rogers (yellow card) 90+3'	Report	Ajer (yellow card) 35'; Schade (red card) 42'; Ouattara 45+1'; Kayode (yellow card) 45+5'; Collins (yellow card) 90+1'; Janelt (yellow card) 90+3'	Stadium: Villa Park; Attendance: 41,415; Referee: Tim Robinson
Note: Fixture was initially scheduled for 24 January, but was rescheduled due to Villa's UEFA Europa League involvements on the preceding Thursday.

7 February 2026 25	Newcastle United	2–3	Brentford	Newcastle upon Tyne
17:30 GMT	Botman 24'; J. Murphy (yellow card) 44'; Bruno Guimarães 79' (pen.); Hall (yellow card) 90+6'	Report	Janelt 37', (yellow card) 90+1'; Thiago 45+2' (pen.), (yellow card) 69'; Ouattara 85'	Stadium: St James' Park; Attendance: 52,032; Referee: Andrew Madley
Note: Fixture was initially scheduled for a 15:00 kick-off, but was rescheduled for live Sky Sports broadcasting.

12 February 2026 26	Brentford	1–1	Arsenal	Brentford
20:00 GMT	Janelt (yellow card) 4'; Jensen (yellow card) 53'; Lewis-Potter 71'; Ouattara (yellow card) 86'	Report	Gabriel (yellow card) 20'; Gyökeres (yellow card) 30'; Madueke 61'	Stadium: Brentford Community Stadium; Attendance: 17,224; Referee: John Brooks
Note: Fixture was initially scheduled for 11 February, but was rescheduled for live TNT Sports broadcasting.

21 February 2026 27	Brentford	0–2	Brighton & Hove Albion	Brentford
15:00 GMT	Yarmolyuk (yellow card) 90+2'	Report	Wieffer (yellow card) 12'; Gómez 30'; Welbeck 45+1'; Kadıoğlu (yellow card) 54'	Stadium: Brentford Community Stadium; Attendance: 17,163; Referee: Jarred Gillett

28 February 2026 28	Burnley	3–4	Brentford	Burnley
15:00 GMT	Kayode 45+3' (o.g.); Anthony 47'; Flemming 60'; Humphreys (yellow card) 86'; Foster (yellow card) 90+11'	Report	Damsgaard 9', 90+3'; Thiago 25', (yellow card) 77'; Schade 34'; Yarmolyuk (yellow card) 90+10'	Stadium: Turf Moor; Attendance: 20,069; Referee: Sam Barrott

3 March 2026 29	Bournemouth	0–0	Brentford	Bournemouth
19:30 GMT	Adams (yellow card) 90+4'; Tavernier (yellow card) 90+5'	Report	Jensen (yellow card) 60'	Stadium: Dean Court; Attendance: 11,108; Referee: Craig Pawson
Note: Fixture was initially scheduled for 4 March, but was rescheduled for live TNT Sports broadcasting.

16 March 2026 30	Brentford	2–2	Wolverhampton Wanderers	Brentford
20:00 GMT	Kayode 22'; Thiago 37'; Collins (yellow card) 57'; Ajer (yellow card) 77'	Report	Armstrong (yellow card) 24', (goal) 44'; Krejčí (yellow card) 45+1'; Arokodare 77'; A. Gomes (yellow card) 89'; Sá (yellow card) 90+3'	Stadium: Brentford Community Stadium; Attendance: 17,155; Referee: Stuart Attwell
Note: Fixture was initially scheduled for 14 March, but was rescheduled for live Sky Sports broadcasting.

21 March 2026 31	Leeds United	0–0	Brentford	Leeds
20:00 GMT	Struijk (yellow card) 38'; Bogle (yellow card) 42'	Report		Stadium: Elland Road; Attendance: 36,386; Referee: Jarred Gillett
Note: Fixture was initially scheduled for a 15:00 kick-off, but was rescheduled for live Sky Sports broadcasting.

11 April 2026 32	Brentford	2–2	Everton	Brentford
15:00 BST	Thiago 3' (pen.), 77'	Report	Pickford (yellow card) 2'; Beto 26'; Garner (yellow card) 47'; Dewsbury-Hall 90+1'	Stadium: Brentford Community Stadium; Attendance: 17,220; Referee: Farai Hallam

18 April 2026 33	Brentford	0–0	Fulham	Brentford
12:30 BST		Report	Lukić (yellow card) 6'	Stadium: Brentford Community Stadium; Attendance: 17,171; Referee: Paul Tierney
Note: Fixture was initially scheduled for a 15:00 kick-off, but was brought forward for live TNT Sports broadcasting.

27 April 2026 34	Manchester United	2–1	Brentford	Trafford
20:00 BST	Shaw (yellow card) 6'; Casemiro 11'; Šeško 43'; Zirkzee (yellow card) 90+2'	Report	Van den Berg (yellow card) 40'; Ouattara (yellow card) 71'; Thiago (yellow card) 76'; Jensen 87'; Collins (yellow card) 90+6'	Stadium: Old Trafford; Attendance: 73,773; Referee: Chris Kavanagh
Note: Fixture was initially scheduled for 25 April, but was rescheduled for live Sky Sports broadcasting.

2 May 2026 35	Brentford	3–0	West Ham United	Brentford
15:00 BST	Mavropanos 15' (o.g.); Thiago 54' (pen.); Kayode (yellow card) 73'; Damsgaard 82'	Report	Castellanos (yellow card) 59'; Summerville (yellow card) 62'; Scarles (yellow card) 90+6'	Stadium: Brentford Community Stadium; Attendance: 17,194; Referee: Craig Pawson

9 May 2026 36	Manchester City	3–0	Brentford	Manchester
17:30 BST	Silva (yellow card) 36'; Doku 60'; O'Reilly (yellow card) 74'; Haaland 75'; Nunes (yellow card) 88'; Marmoush 90+2', (yellow card) 90+5'	Report	Ajer (yellow card) 80'; Henderson (yellow card) 88'	Stadium: City of Manchester Stadium; Attendance: 52,489; Referee: Michael Salisbury
Note: Fixture was initially scheduled for a 15:00 kick-off, but was pushed back for live Sky Sports broadcasting.

17 May 2026 37	Brentford	2–2	Crystal Palace	Brentford
15:00 BST	Ouattara 40', 88'; Kayode (yellow card) 90+5'	Report	Sarr 6' (pen.); Wharton 52'; Richards (yellow card) 83'; Lerma (yellow card) 89'; Henderson (yellow card) 90+5'	Stadium: Brentford Community Stadium; Attendance: 17,213; Referee: Sam Barrott

24 May 2026 38	Liverpool	1–1	Brentford	Liverpool
16:00 BST	Jones 58'; Konaté (yellow card) 79'; Mac Allister (yellow card) 90+2'	Report	Schade 64'; Henderson (yellow card) 80'; Janelt (yellow card) 90+3'; Collins (yellow card) 90+5'	Stadium: Anfield; Attendance: 60,325; Referee: Darren England

=== FA Cup ===
Brentford entered the competition in the third round, and were drawn away to Sheffield Wednesday. They were then drawn away to Macclesfield in the fourth round, and away to West Ham United in the fifth round.

Win Draw Loss Fixtures

10 January 2026 Third round	Sheffield Wednesday	0–2	Brentford	Owlerton
15:00 GMT		Report	Lewis-Potter 27'; Jensen 64' (pen.)	Stadium: Hillsborough Stadium; Attendance: 10,642; Referee: Josh Smith

16 February 2026 Fourth round	Macclesfield	0–1	Brentford	Macclesfield
19:30 GMT	Edmondson (yellow card) 75'; Dawson (yellow card) 84'	Report	Janelt (yellow card) 21'; Heathcote 70' (o.g.); Yarmolyuk (yellow card) 77'	Stadium: Moss Rose; Attendance: 5,348; Referee: Darren England

9 March 2026 Fifth round	West Ham United	2–2 (a.e.t.) (5–3 p)	Brentford	Stratford, London
19:30 GMT	Bowen 19', 34' (pen.); Summerville (yellow card) 80'; Souček (yellow card) 89'	Report	Thiago 28', 81' (pen.)	Stadium: London Stadium; Attendance: 48,570; Referee: Andrew Madley
	Penalties
	Bowen (penalty scored); Castellanos (penalty scored); Wilson (penalty scored); Souček (penalty scored); Mavropanos (penalty scored)		(penalty scored) Thiago; (penalty missed) Ouattara; (penalty scored) Lewis-Potter; (penalty scored) Jensen

=== EFL Cup ===
Brentford entered the competition in the second round, and were drawn away to Bournemouth. They were then drawn at home to Aston Villa in the third round, away to Grimsby Town in the fourth round, and away to Manchester City in the quarter-finals.

Win Draw Loss Fixtures

26 August 2025 Second round	Bournemouth	0–2	Brentford	Bournemouth
19:45 BST	Adli (yellow card) 51'; Araujo (yellow card) 70' (yellow-red card) 90+1'	Report	Carvalho 34', (yellow card) 70'; Thiago 65', (yellow card) 80'; Kayode (yellow card) 87'	Stadium: Dean Court; Attendance: 10,499; Referee: Michael Salisbury

16 September 2025 Third round	Brentford	1–1 (4–2 p)	Aston Villa	Brentford
20:00 BST	Hickey 57'	Report	Guessand (yellow card) 25'; Elliott 43'; Bogarde (yellow card) 68'	Stadium: Brentford Community Stadium; Attendance: 15,895; Referee: John Brooks
	Penalties
	Carvalho (penalty scored); Nelson (penalty scored); Yarmolyuk (penalty scored); Damsgaard (penalty scored)		(penalty missed) McGinn; (penalty scored) Watkins; (penalty scored) Buendía; (penalty missed) Cash

28 October 2025 Fourth round	Grimsby Town	0–5	Brentford	Cleethorpes
19:45 GMT	Khouri (yellow card) 54'; McJannet (yellow card) 77'	Report	Jensen 22'; Lewis-Potter 26'; Nelson 43'; Carvalho 54' (pen.); Collins 75'	Stadium: Blundell Park; Attendance: 8,637; Referee: Thomas Kirk

17 December 2025 Quarter-finals	Manchester City	2–0	Brentford	Manchester
19:30 GMT	Khusanov (yellow card) 16'; Cherki 32'; Savinho 67'; Nunes (yellow card) 86'	Report		Stadium: City of Manchester Stadium; Attendance: 38,254; Referee: Sam Barrott

== Statistics ==
=== Appearances and goals ===
As of match played 24 May 2026

No.	Pos.	Nat.	Player	League		FA Cup		EFL Cup		Total	
No.	Pos.	Nat.	Player	Apps	Goals	Apps	Goals	Apps	Goals	Apps	Goals
1	GK	(Republic of Ireland)	Caoimhín Kelleher	37	0	1	0	0	0	38	0
2	DF	(Scotland)	Aaron Hickey	8 (13)	0	2	0	2 (1)	1	12 (14)	1
3	DF	(Jamaica)	Rico Henry	14 (11)	0	1	0	4	0	19 (11)	0
4	DF	(Netherlands)	Sepp van den Berg	30 (2)	0	1 (1)	0	4	0	35 (3)	0
5	DF	(Jamaica)	Ethan Pinnock	4	0	2	0	2	0	8	0
6	MF	(England)	Jordan Henderson	22 (10)	1	2	0	0	0	24 (10)	1
7	FW	(Germany)	Kevin Schade	32 (3)	8	1	0	2 (1)	0	35 (4)	7
8	MF	(Denmark)	Mathias Jensen	26 (10)	3	2 (1)	1	3	1	31 (11)	5
9	FW	(Brazil)	Igor Thiago	37 (1)	22	1	2	0 (1)	1	38 (2)	25
10	MF	(England)	Josh Dasilva	0 (2)	0	0	0	0	0	0 (2)	0
11	FW	(England)	Reiss Nelson	0 (10)	0	2	0	1 (1)	1	3 (11)	1
12	GK	(Iceland)	Hákon Valdimarsson	1	0	2	0	4	0	7	0
14	MF	(Portugal)	Fábio Carvalho	1 (5)	1	0	0	3	2	4 (5)	3
15	MF	(Nigeria)	Frank Onyeka	0 (6)	0	0	0	3	0	3 (6)	0
17	MF	(Netherlands)	Antoni Milambo	1	0	0	0	2	0	3	0
18	MF	(Ukraine)	Yehor Yarmolyuk	30 (7)	1	2	0	1 (2)	0	33 (9)	1
19	FW	(Burkina Faso)	Dango Ouattara	25 (7)	7	1 (1)	0	2 (1)	0	28 (9)	7
20	DF	(Norway)	Kristoffer Ajer	20 (7)	0	1	0	3	0	24 (7)	0
22	DF	(Republic of Ireland)	Nathan Collins	32 (3)	1	2	0	1 (3)	1	35 (6)	2
23	DF	(England)	Keane Lewis-Potter	22 (14)	3	2 (1)	1	1 (1)	1	25 (16)	5
24	MF	(Denmark)	Mikkel Damsgaard	23 (10)	4	2	0	1 (1)	0	26 (11)	4
25	MF	(England)	Myles Peart-Harris	0 (1)	0	0	0	0	0	0 (1)	0
26	MF	(Turkey)	Yunus Konak	0	0	0 (1)	0	0 (1)	0	0 (2)	0
27	MF	(Germany)	Vitaly Janelt	15 (10)	1	1 (1)	0	2 (1)	0	18 (12)	1
33	DF	(Italy)	Michael Kayode	36	1	2 (1)	0	1 (3)	0	39 (4)	1
39	FW	(Brazil)	Gustavo Nunes	0	0	0 (1)	0	0 (1)	0	0 (2)	0
43	DF	(England)	Benjamin Arthur	0	0	0 (1)	0	2	0	2 (1)	0
45	FW	(England)	Romelle Donovan	0 (4)	0	2 (1)	0	0 (2)	0	2 (7)	0
47	FW	(Belgium)	Kaye Furo	0 (1)	0	1 (1)	0	0	0	1 (2)	0
48	MF	(Belgium)	Luka Bentt	0	0	0 (1)	0	0	0	0 (1)	0

- Source: Soccerbase

=== Goalscorers ===
As of match played 24 May 2026

Includes all competitive matches. The list is sorted by squad number when total goals are equal.

Rank	No.	Nat.	Player	PL	FAC	EFLC	Total	
Rank	1	9	(Brazil)	Igor Thiago	22	2	1	25
2	7	(Germany)	Kevin Schade	8	0	0	8	
3	19	(Burkina Faso)	Dango Ouattara	7	0	0	7	
4	8	(Denmark)	Mathias Jensen	3	1	1	5	
4	23	(England)	Keane Lewis-Potter	3	1	1	5	
6	24	(Denmark)	Mikkel Damsgaard	4	0	0	4	
7	14	(Portugal)	Fábio Carvalho	1	0	2	3	
8	22	(England)	Nathan Collins	1	0	1	2	
9	2	(Scotland)	Aaron Hickey	0	0	1	1	
9	6	(England)	Jordan Henderson	1	0	0	1	
9	11	(England)	Reiss Nelson	0	0	1	1	
9	18	(Ukraine)	Yegor Yarmolyuk	1	0	0	1	
9	27	(Germany)	Vitaly Janelt	1	0	0	1	
9	33	(Italy)	Michael Kayode	1	0	0	1	
Own goals				2	1	0	3	
Total				56	5	8	69	

- Source: Soccerbase, FBREF

=== Discipline ===
As of match played 24 May 2026

Rank	No.	Pos.	Player	Premier League			FA Cup			EFL Cup			Total		
Rank	No.	Pos.	Player	Yellow card	(yellow card) (yellow-red card)	Red card	Yellow card	(yellow card) (yellow-red card)	Red card	Yellow card	(yellow card) (yellow-red card)	Red card	Yellow card	(yellow card) (yellow-red card)	Red card
1	7	FW	(Germany) Kevin Schade	6	0	1	0	0	0	0	0	0	6	0	1
2	27	MF	(Germany) Vitaly Janelt	8	0	0	1	0	0	0	0	0	9	0	0
3	9	FW	(Brazil) Igor Thiago	7	0	0	0	0	0	1	0	0	8	0	0
3	18	MF	(Ukraine) Yehor Yarmolyuk	7	0	0	1	0	0	0	0	0	8	0	0
3	33	DF	(Italy) Michael Kayode	8	0	0	0	0	0	0	0	0	8	0	0
6	6	MF	(England) Jordan Henderson	6	0	0	0	0	0	0	0	0	6	0	0
6	22	DF	(Republic of Ireland) Nathan Collins	6	0	0	0	0	0	0	0	0	6	0	0
8	19	FW	(Burkina Faso) Dango Ouattara	5	0	0	0	0	0	0	0	0	5	0	0
9	20	DF	(Norway) Kristoffer Ajer	4	0	0	0	0	0	0	0	0	4	0	0
10	8	MF	(Denmark) Mathias Jensen	3	0	0	0	0	0	0	0	0	3	0	0
11	3	DF	(Jamaica) Rico Henry	2	0	0	0	0	0	0	0	0	2	0	0
11	4	DF	(Netherlands) Sepp van den Berg	2	0	0	0	0	0	0	0	0	2	0	0
11	23	MF	(England) Keane Lewis-Potter	2	0	0	0	0	0	0	0	0	2	0	0
14	1	GK	(Republic of Ireland) Caoimhín Kelleher	1	0	0	0	0	0	0	0	0	1	0	0
14	2	DF	(Scotland) Aaron Hickey	1	0	0	0	0	0	0	0	0	1	0	0
14	5	DF	(Jamaica) Ethan Pinnock	1	0	0	0	0	0	0	0	0	1	0	0
14	14	MF	(Portugal) Fábio Carvalho	1	0	0	0	0	0	0	0	0	1	0	0
Total				69	0	1	2	0	0	1	0	0	72	0	1

- Source: FBREF

== Honours ==
=== Player of the Month ===
Month	Player	Ref.
August 2025	(Italy) Michael Kayode	
September 2025	(England) Jordan Henderson	
October 2025	(Italy) Michael Kayode	
November 2025	(Brazil) Igor Thiago	
December 2025	(Republic of Ireland) Caoimhín Kelleher	
