= Michael Kayode =

Italian footballer (born 2004)

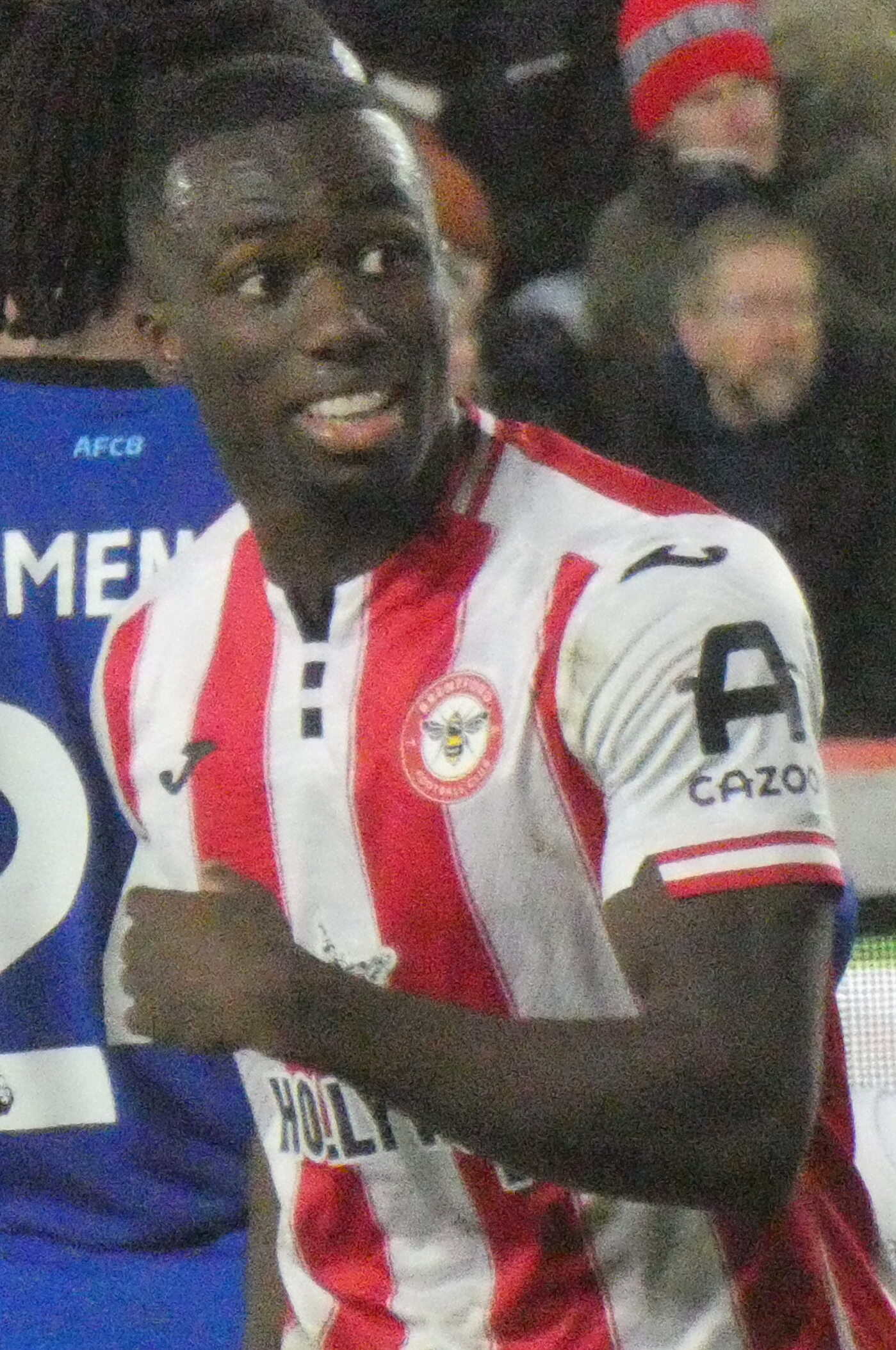
- Kayode with Brentford in 2025

Personal information
- Full name: Michael Olabode Kayode
- Date of birth: 10 July 2004 (age 22)
- Place of birth: Borgomanero, Italy
- Height: 1.79 m (5 ft 10 in)
- Position: Right-back

Team information
- Current team: Brentford
- Number: 33

Youth career
- 2014−2018: Juventus
- 2018−2020: Gozzano

Senior career*
Years	Team	Apps	(Gls)
2020−2021	Gozzano	34	(2)
2021−2025	Fiorentina	31	(1)
2025	→ Brentford (loan)	12	(0)
2025–	Brentford	42	(2)

International career^{‡}
2021−2022	Italy U18	4	(0)
2022−2023	Italy U19	12	(1)
2023−2026	Italy U21	10	(0)
2026–	Italy	5	(1)
Medal record
Men's football
Representing Italy
UEFA European Under-19 Championship
Winner	2023 Malta
- * Club domestic league appearances and goals as of 07:16, 22 September 2026 (UTC) ‡ National team caps and goals as of 15 November 2026

Michael Olabode Kayode (born 10 July 2004) is an Italian professional footballer who plays as a right-back for Premier League club Brentford and the Italy national team.

== Early life ==
Kayode was born on 10 July 2004, in Borgomanero, Italy, and is of Nigerian descent.

== Club career ==
=== Gozzano ===
Kayode started his youth career at the academy of Juventus, where he remained for seven years until 2018. He played the 2020–21 season with Serie D club Gozzano, with which he scored two goals along with two assists in 34 matches, and gained promotion to Serie C with the club. He cited his experience in Serie D as "a step backwards to make two forwards".

=== Fiorentina ===
Kayode joined Fiorentina after his spell in Serie D during 2021, and was integrated into their youth sector. With Fiorentina, he won one Coppa Italia Primavera and one Supercoppa Italiana Primavera.

On 19 August 2023, Kayode made his Serie A debut for Fiorentina in a 4–1 away victory over Genoa. On 26 February 2024, he scored his first goal in a 2–1 win over Lazio. By the end of the season, Kayode had become a regular in Fiorentina's first team with his performances reportedly attracting international attention from clubs around Europe, featuring heavily in Serie A and in the squad that reached the final of the UEFA Conference League.

=== Brentford ===
On 24 January 2025, English club Brentford announced that they had signed Kayode on loan for the remainder of the 2024–25 season, with an option to make the deal permanent. Brentford signed Kayode permanently in May 2025, on a contract lasting until 2030. He scored his first Premier League goal for the club in a 2–2 draw with Wolverhampton Wanderers on 16 March 2026. Later that year, on 3 July, he extended his contract until 2032.

== International career ==
Kayode represented Italy at U18, U19 and U21 levels.

In July 2023, Kayode's 19th minute goal decided the final of the 2023 UEFA European Under-19 Championship, which Italy won 1–0 against Portugal.

On 17 October 2023, he made his debut with Italy U21, in the qualifying match won 2–0 against Norway in Bolzano.

Kayode was called up with the Italy national team by head coach Roberto Mancini in September 2026. On 28 September, Kayode scored his first goal for the Italian national team on his international debut, which came in a 4–1 away win over Turkey in the Nations League.

== Style of play ==
Predominantly a right-back, at Fiorentina, Kayode also played as a left-back or in a double pivot as a third centre-back. He has been noted for his long throws, frequently creating chances from throw-ins.

== Career statistics ==
=== Club ===
As of match played 18 September 2026

Appearances and goals by club, season and competition
Club	Season	League			National cup (Note: Includes Coppa Italia, FA Cup)		League cup (Note: Includes EFL Cup)		Europe		Other		Total	
Club	Season	Division	Apps	Goals	Apps	Goals	Apps	Goals	Apps	Goals	Apps	Goals	Apps	Goals
Gozzano	2020–21	Serie D	34	2	—		—		—		—		34	2
Fiorentina	2023–24	Serie A	26	1	4	0	—		6 (Note: Appearances in UEFA (Europa) Conference League)	0	1 (Note: Appearance in Supercoppa Italiana)	0	37	1
Fiorentina	2024–25	Serie A	5	0	0	0	—		7	0	—		12	0
Fiorentina	Total		31	1	4	0	—		13	0	1	0	49	1
Brentford (loan)	2024–25	Premier League	12	0	—		—		—		—		12	0
Brentford	2025–26	Premier League	37	1	3	0	4	0	—		—		44	1
Brentford	2026–27	Premier League	5	1	0	0	2	0	—		—		7	1
Brentford	Brentford total		54	2	3	0	6	0	—		—		63	2
Career total			119	5	7	0	6	0	13	0	1	0	146	5

=== International ===
As of match played 15 November 2026

Appearances and goals by national team and year
National team	Year	Apps	Goals
Italy	2026	5	1
Total		5	1

Scores and results list Italy's goal tally first, score column indicates score after each Kayode goal.

List of international goals scored by Michael Kayode
No.	Date	Venue	Cap	Opponent	Score	Result	Competition
1	28 September 2026	Centennial Atatürk Stadium, Bursa, Turkey	1	Turkey	3–0	4–1	2026–27 UEFA Nations League A

== Honours ==
Fiorentina U19

- Supercoppa Primavera: 2021–22, 2023–24
- Coppa Italia Primavera: 2021–22

Fiorentina

- UEFA Europa Conference League runner-up: 2023–24

Italy U19

- UEFA European Under-19 Championship: 2023

Individual

- Best Italian Player Under 21: 2024
