= Kaye Furo =

Belgian footballer (born 2007)

Personal information
- Full name: Kaye Furo Tamuno Iyowuna
- Date of birth: 6 February 2007 (age 19)
- Height: 1.90 m (6 ft 3 in)
- Position: Striker

Team information
- Current team: Brentford
- Number: 47

Youth career
- –2022: Royal Antwerp
- 2022–: Club Brugge

Senior career*
| Years | Team | Apps | (Gls) |
| 2023–2025 | Club NXT | 41 | (8) |
| 2025–2026 | Club Brugge | 5 | (1) |
| 2026– | Brentford | 1 | (0) |

International career^{‡}
| 2022 | Belgium U15 | 1 | (0) |
| 2023 | Belgium U16 | 7 | (0) |
| 2024 | Belgium U17 | 3 | (2) |
| 2024 | Belgium U18 | 4 | (4) |
| 2024–2026 | Belgium U19 | 13 | (7) |
| 2025– | Belgium U21 | 1 | (0) |
- * Club domestic league appearances and goals as of 21 December 2025 ‡ National team caps and goals as of 15:50, 18 November 2026 (UTC)

Kaye Furo Tamuno Iyowuna (born 6 February 2007) is a Belgian professional footballer who plays as a striker for Premier League club Brentford. He is a Belgium youth international.

== Club career ==
Furo was a member of the Royal Antwerp youth academy prior to signing for Club Brugge in 2017. In 2022, at the age of 15 years-old, he signed his first professional contract, agreeing a five-year deal. That year, he featured for the U19 Club NXT side in the UEFA Youth League, his performances including a goal in a win against Atletico Madrid U19.

He made his professional debut for Club NXT in the Challenger Pro League as a substitute for Víctor Barberá in the 86th minute in their 1–0 defeat against Lommel S.K. on 18 August 2023.

He made his senior debut for Club Brugge; featuring for the club in the UEFA Champions League, on 27 August 2025, appearing as a second-half substitute in the 68th minute, replacing Nicolò Tresoldi, against Glasgow Rangers in a 6–0 victory, the second leg of a 9–1 aggregate win.

=== Brentford ===
On 11 January 2026, Furo joined Premier League club Brentford, signing a five-and-a-half-year contract, for a reported fee of £8.7 million.. On 16 February 2026, he made his debut for the club in a 1–0 away win against Macclesfield in the FA Cup fourth round, and made his Premier League debut on 2 May 2026 in a 3–0 home victory over West Ham United, being substituted on in the 89th minute.

== International career ==
A Belgian youth international, he has represented the Belgium national under-19 football team.

== Personal life ==
He is of Nigerian descent. His father, Iyenemi Furo, played professional football in Belgium for KSV Waregem and Royal Antwerp.

== Career statistics ==
As of match played 16 February 2026

Appearances and goals by club, season and competition
| Club | Season | League | | | National cup (Note: Includes Belgian Cup, FA Cup) | | League cup | | Europe | | Other | | Total | |
| Club | Season | Division | Apps | Goals | Apps | Goals | Apps | Goals | Apps | Goals | Apps | Goals | Apps | Goals |
|---|---|---|---|---|---|---|---|---|---|---|---|---|---|---|
| Club NXT | 2023–24 | Challenger Pro League | 14 | 0 | — | | — | | — | | — | | 14 | 0 |
| Club NXT | 2024–25 | Challenger Pro League | 18 | 8 | — | | — | | — | | — | | 18 | 8 |
| Club NXT | 2025–26 | Challenger Pro League | 9 | 0 | — | | — | | — | | — | | 9 | 0 |
| Club NXT | Total | | 41 | 8 | — | | — | | — | | — | | 41 | 8 |
| Club Brugge | 2025–26 | Belgian Pro League | 5 | 1 | 1 | 0 | — | | 2 (Note: Appearances in UEFA Champions League) | 0 | — | | 8 | 1 |
| Brentford | 2025–26 | Premier League | 1 | 0 | 1 | 0 | — | | — | | — | | 2 | 0 |
| Career total | | | 47 | 9 | 2 | 0 | 0 | 0 | 2 | 0 | — | | 50 | 10 |
