= Belgium national under-19 football team =

National under-19 association football team representing Belgium

Belgium U-19
- Association: Belgian Football Association
- Head coach: Wesley Sonck
First colours	Second colours

World Cup
- Appearances: 1 (first in 1997)
- Best result: Round of 16 (1997)

European championships
- Appearances: 4 (first in 2002)
- Best result: Group stage (2002, 2004, 2006 & 2011)

The Belgium national under-19 football team is the national under-19 football team of Belgium and is controlled by the Belgian Football Association. The team competes in the European Under-19 Football Championship, held every year. Their biggest success was winning the tournament in 1977, albeit it wore a different name and had a different structure back then.

== Competitive Record ==
=== FIFA U-20 World Cup Record ===
Year	Round	GP	W	D*	L	GS	GA
(Tunisia) 1977	did not qualify						
(Japan) 1979	did not qualify						
(Australia) 1981	did not qualify						
(Mexico) 1983	did not qualify						
(Soviet Union) 1985	did not qualify						
(Chile) 1987	did not qualify						
(Saudi Arabia) 1989	did not qualify						
(Portugal) 1991	did not qualify						
(Australia) 1993	did not qualify						
(Qatar) 1995	did not qualify						
(Malaysia) 1997	Round of 16	4	1	1	2	4	14
(Nigeria) 1999	did not qualify						
(Argentina) 2001	did not qualify						
(United Arab Emirates) 2003	did not qualify						
(Netherlands) 2005	did not qualify						
(Canada) 2007	did not qualify						
(Egypt) 2009	did not qualify						
(Colombia) 2011	did not qualify						
(Turkey) 2013	did not qualify						
(New Zealand) 2015	did not qualify						
(South Korea) 2017	did not qualify						
(Poland) 2019	did not qualify						
(Argentina) 2023	did not qualify						
(Chile) 2025	did not qualify						
(Azerbaijan) (Uzbekistan) 2027	did not qualify						
(Armenia) (Georgia (country)) 2029	To be determined						
Total	1/25	4	1	1	2	4	14

=== UEFA European Under-19 Championship Record ===
Year	Round	GP	W	D	L	GS	GA
(Norway) 2002	Group stage	3	0	1	2	3	5
(Liechtenstein) 2003	did not qualify						
(Switzerland) 2004	Group stage	3	0	1	2	0	6
(Northern Ireland) 2005	did not qualify						
(Poland) 2006	Group stage	3	1	0	2	6	10
(Austria) 2007	did not qualify						
(Czech Republic) 2008	did not qualify						
(Ukraine) 2009	did not qualify						
(France) 2010	did not qualify						
(Romania) 2011	Group stage	3	0	2	1	3	6
(Estonia) 2012	did not qualify						
(Lithuania) 2013	did not qualify						
(Hungary) 2014	did not qualify						
(Greece) 2015	did not qualify						
(Germany) 2016	did not qualify						
(Georgia (country)) 2017	did not qualify						
(Finland) 2018	did not qualify						
(Armenia) 2019	did not qualify						
(Slovakia) 2022	did not qualify						
(Malta) 2023	did not qualify						
(Northern Ireland) 2024	did not qualify						
(Romania) 2025	did not qualify						
(Wales) 2026	did not qualify						
(Czech Republic) 2027	TBD						
(Bulgaria) 2028	TBD						
(Netherlands) 2029	TBD						
Total	4/20	12	1	4	7	12	27

== Players ==
=== Current squad ===
The following players were called up for the 2027 UEFA European Under-19 Championship qualification matches against Denmark, Czech Republic and Latvia on 25, 28 and 31 March 2026; respectively in Czech Republic.

Caps and goals correct as of 31 March 2026, after the match against Latvia.

No.	Pos.	Player	Date of birth (age)	Caps	Goals	Club
1	GK	Argus Vanden Driessche	22 April 2007 (age 19)	8	0	(Royal Belgian Football Association) Club Brugge
12	GK	Emile Doucouré	28 September 2007 (age 19)	1	0	(Royal Belgian Football Association) Genk
	GK	Axel Willockx	7 February 2007 (age 19)	0	0	(Royal Belgian Football Association) Mechelen
2	DF	Semm Renders	17 December 2007 (age 18)	3	0	(Royal Belgian Football Association) Royal Antwerp
3	DF	Brad Manguelle	27 November 2007 (age 18)	6	0	(Royal Belgian Football Association) Genk
5	DF	Maël Debondt	11 May 2007 (age 19)	10	1	(French Football Federation) Reims
14	DF	Nunzio Engwanda	1 December 2007 (age 18)	7	0	(Royal Belgian Football Association) Anderlecht
17	DF	Wout Verlinden	4 January 2007 (age 19)	5	0	(Royal Belgian Football Association) Club Brugge
20	DF	Davis Opoku	29 October 2007 (age 19)	9	0	(Royal Belgian Football Association) Oud-Heverlee Leuven
4	MF	Samuel Nibombe	15 August 2007 (age 19)	6	0	(French Football Federation) Monaco
6	MF	Zaïd Bafdili	25 October 2007 (age 19)	8	0	(Portuguese Football Federation) Sporting CP
8	MF	Luka Bentt	1 October 2007 (age 19)	9	1	(The Football Association) Brentford
10	MF	Noah Fernandez	9 January 2008 (age 18)	6	0	(Royal Dutch Football Association) PSV Eindhoven
15	MF	Joyeux Masanka Bungi	24 January 2007 (age 19)	2	0	(United States Soccer Federation) New York Red Bulls
16	MF	Sebastian Murru	16 March 2007 (age 19)	8	1	(Royal Belgian Football Association) Oud-Heverlee Leuven
18	MF	Kenny Liema Olinga	26 June 2007 (age 19)	5	0	(Italian Football Federation) Torino
7	FW	Ali Donny Sylla	23 May 2007 (age 19)	6	2	(Royal Belgian Football Association) Gent
9	FW	Kaye Furo	6 February 2007 (age 19)	13	7	(The Football Association) Brentford
11	FW	Jesse Bisiwu	22 January 2008 (age 18)	1	0	(Royal Belgian Football Association) Club Brugge
19	FW	Yanis Musuayi	26 June 2007 (age 19)	10	3	(Royal Belgian Football Association) Club Brugge
21	FW	Jakke van Britsom	13 February 2007 (age 19)	5	1	(Royal Belgian Football Association) Club Brugge

=== Recent call-ups ===
The following players have also been called up recently and still eligible for selection.

Pos.	Player	Date of birth (age)	Caps	Goals	Club	Latest call-up
DF	Ian Struyf	22 August 2007 (age 19)	6	1	(Belgium) Mechelen	v. Portugal, 18 November 2025
DF	Michée Ndembi	4 July 2007 (age 19)	5	0	(Portugal) Benfica	v. Portugal, 18 November 2025
DF	Lenn-Minh Tran	13 March 2007 (age 19)	4	0	(Netherlands) MVV Maastricht	v. Portugal, 18 November 2025
MF	Enzo Keutgen	5 April 2007 (age 19)	6	0	(Italy) Juventus	v. Portugal, 18 November 2025
MF	Lucas Delorge	16 June 2007 (age 19)	4	0	(Belgium) Club Brugge	v. Portugal, 18 November 2025-
FW	Wilson Da Costa	28 February 2007 (age 19)	14	2	(Belgium) Genk	v. Portugal, 18 November 2025
FW	Lino Decresson	14 March 2007 (age 19)	3	1	(Belgium) Genk	v. Portugal, 18 November 2025

== Head-to-head record ==
The following table shows Belgium's head-to-head record in the FIFA U-20 World Cup.

Opponent	Pld	W	D	L	GF	GA	GD	Win %
Brazil	1	0	0	1	0	10	−10	0.00
Malaysia	1	1	0	0	3	0	+3	100.00
Morocco	1	0	1	0	1	1	+0	0.00
Uruguay	1	0	0	1	0	3	−3	0.00
Total	4	1	1	2	4	14	−10	25.00

== See also ==
- Belgium national football team
- Belgium national under-21 football team
- Belgium national under-17 football team
- European Under-19 Football Championship
