= Hákon Valdimarsson =

Icelandic footballer (born 2001)

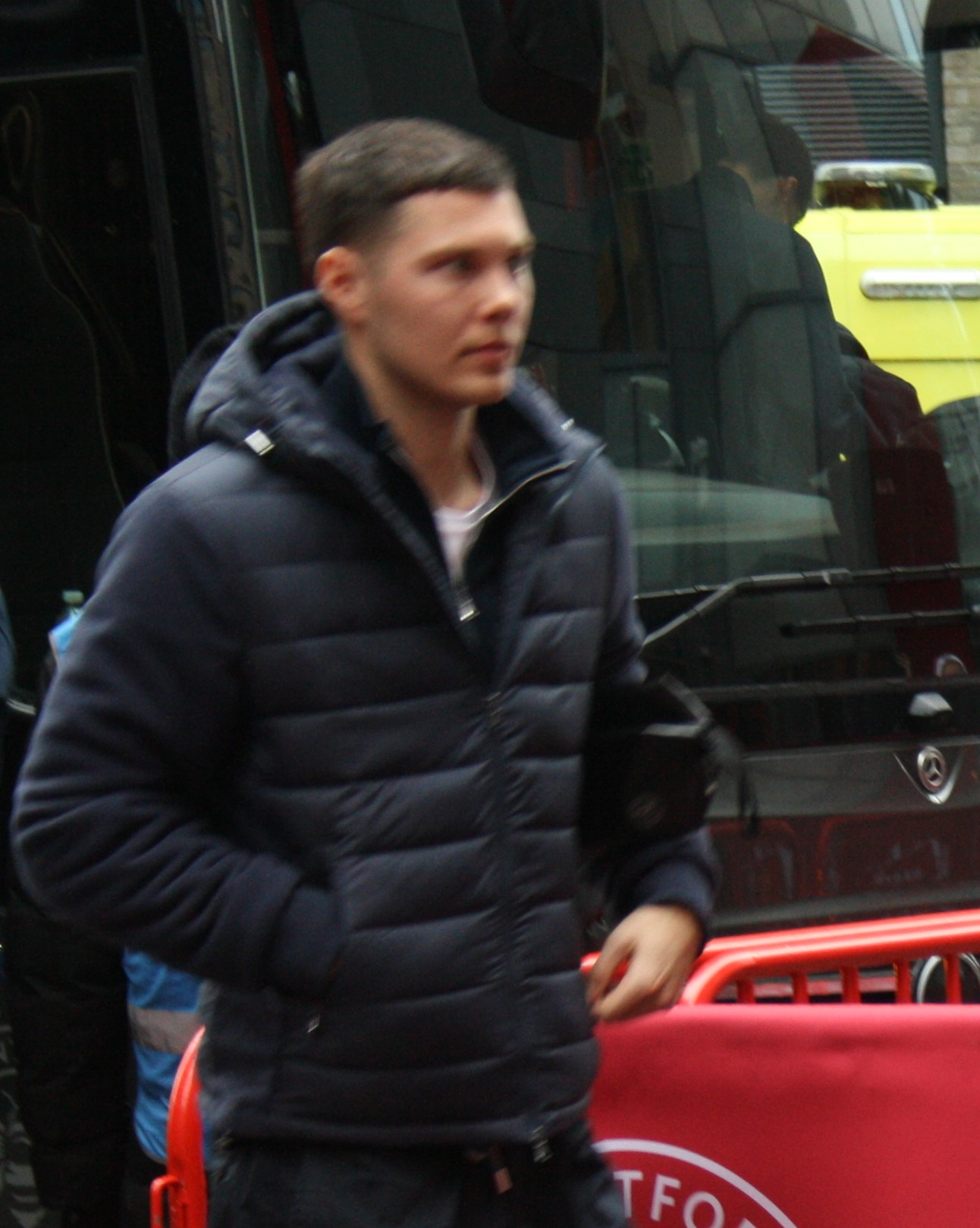
- Hákon in 2025

Personal information
- Full name: Hákon Rafn Valdimarsson
- Date of birth: 13 October 2001 (age 25)
- Place of birth: Reykjavík, Iceland
- Height: 1.93 m (6 ft 4 in)
- Position: Goalkeeper

Team information
- Current team: Brentford
- Number: 12

Youth career
- –2014: KR
- 2015–2017: Grótta

Senior career*
Years	Team	Apps	(Gls)
2017–2021	Grótta	65	(0)
2021–2024	IF Elfsborg	48	(0)
2024–	Brentford	3	(0)

International career^{‡}
2018	Iceland U18	1	(0)
2019	Iceland U19	1	(0)
2021–2022	Iceland U21	8	(0)
2022–	Iceland	28	(0)
- * Club domestic league appearances and goals as of 6 Mar 2026 ‡ National team caps and goals as of 16 November 2026

Hákon Rafn Valdimarsson (born 13 October 2001) is an Icelandic professional footballer who plays as a goalkeeper for Premier League club Brentford and the Iceland national team.

== Handball ==
As a child, Hákon Valdimarsson played handball in Reykjavík for Knattspyrnufélag Reykjavíkur. He played as an outfield player.

== Club career ==
=== KR ===
After playing for their handball team, Hákon joined the Under-19 football team when they needed a goalkeeper. He played with them for a while, until the first team needed a second goalkeeper.

=== Grótta ===
Hákon joined Grótta in 2015. After playing as an outfield player for the youth sides of KR, he first played as a goalkeeper after his switch to Grótta in 2015, appearing as an outfield player for Grótta's youth sides as late as 2017. He made his senior debut in the last game of the 2017 1. deild season as an already relegated Grótta lost 2–1 to Leiknir Reykjavík. Hákon then played in 15 out of 22 games in the 2018 2. deild as Grótta placed second and were promoted back to 1. deild. In the 2019 season, Hákon played in all 22 matches as Grótta became champions and were promoted to the top tier Úrvalsdeild for the first time.

In 2020 he played all 18 matches as Grótta were relegated back to the 1. deild. It was announced on 30 April 2021 that Hákon had signed with Allsvenskan team IF Elfsborg and that Hákon would join them in the summer. Hákon played nine matches for Grótta in the first half of the 2021 season before joining Elfsborg in July.

=== IF Elfsborg ===
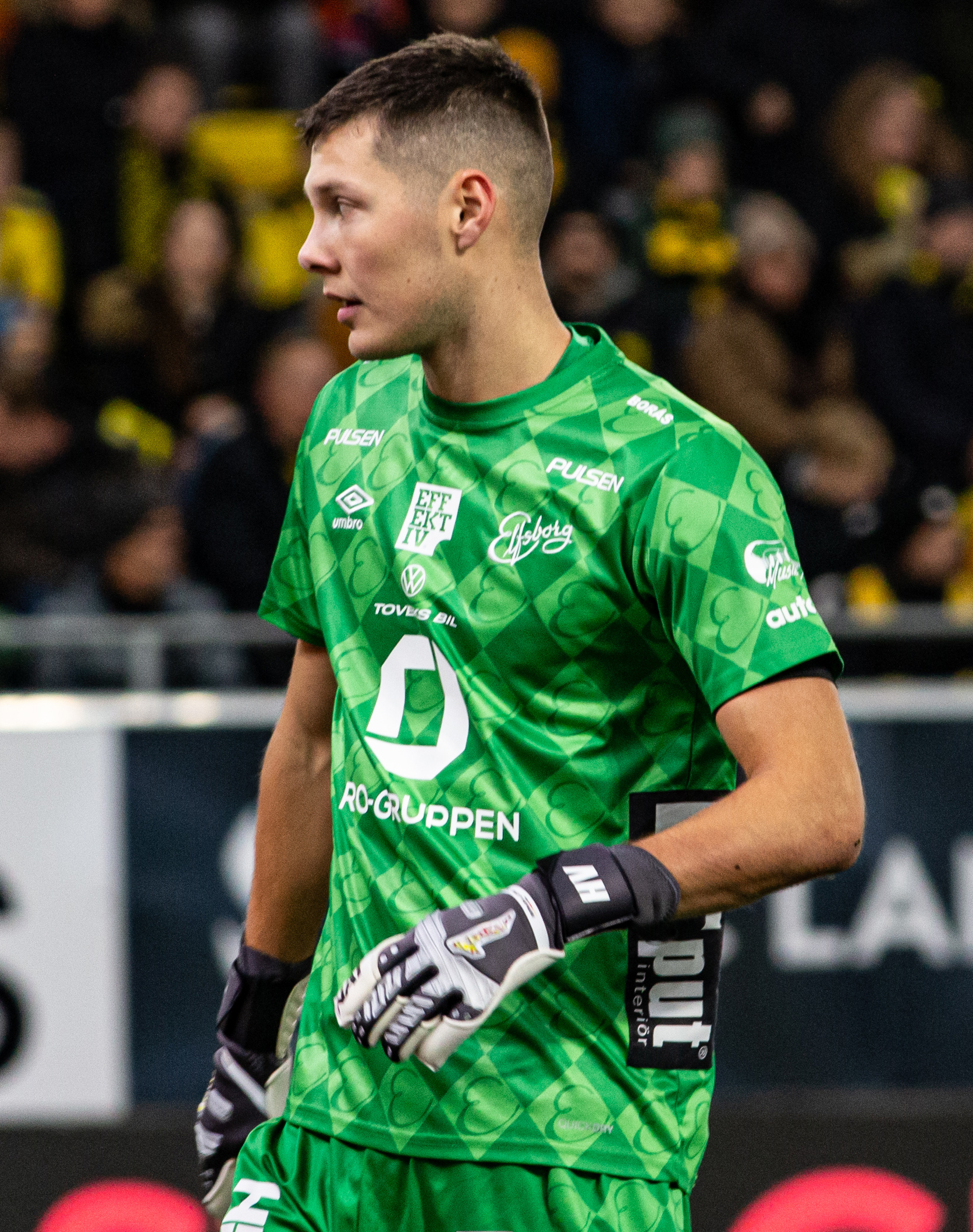
Hákon playing for IF Elfsborg in 2023

It was announced on 30 April 2021 that Hákon had signed with Allsvenskan team IF Elfsborg and that Hákon would join them in the summer, Hákon then joined formally in July. Hákon made his Allsvenskan debut for Elfsborg in a 1–0 win against IFK Göteborg on 1 October 2021 and proceeded to play in the next four matches. Hákon was on the bench for the first half of the 2022 season, before he was given a chance to start in a 1–0 loss against Kalmar FF on 24 July 2022. The following game he was on the bench but a second start of the season in a 1–1 draw against Mjällby AIF saw him cement his place as the starting goalkeeper for IF Elfsborg. Hákon started all but one game in the 2023 season, being sent off in the 29th minute of a 1–0 loss to IFK Värnamo on 2 September 2023. Hákon conceded 22 goals in 29 league appearances, keeping 14 clean sheets. At the end of the season, Hákon was given the Allsvenskan goalkeeper of the year award.

=== Brentford ===
On 26 January 2024, Hákon signed a contract until June 2028 with Premier League club Brentford, for a reported £2.6 million transfer fee. He made his Premier League debut against Brighton & Hove Albion as a first-half substitute on 28 December 2024, after an injury to Mark Flekken.

== International career ==
Hákon has featured for the U-18, U-19 and U-21 Iceland youth teams, debuting in 2018, 2019 and 2021 respectively. On 12 November 2021 Hákon received his first call-up to the senior squad when Patrik Gunnarsson had to withdraw through injury.

== Career statistics ==
=== Club ===
As of match played 25 August 2026

Appearances and goals by club, season and competition
Club	Season	League			National cup (Note: Includes Icelandic Cup, Svenska Cupen, FA Cup)		League cup (Note: Includes EFL Cup)		Europe		Other		Total	
Club	Season	Division	Apps	Goals	Apps	Goals	Apps	Goals	Apps	Goals	Apps	Goals	Apps	Goals
Grótta	2017	1. deild	1	0	0	0	2	0	―		―		3	0
Grótta	2018	2. deild	15	0	0	0	3	0	―		―		18	0
Grótta	2019	1. deild	22	0	3	0	3	0	―		―		28	0
Grótta	2020	Úrvalsdeild	18	0	2	0	3	0	―		―		23	0
Grótta	2021	1. deild	9	0	0	0	3	0	―		―		12	0
Grótta	Total		65	0	5	0	14	0	―		―		84	0
IF Elfsborg	2021	Allsvenskan	5	0	―		―		0	0	―		5	0
IF Elfsborg	2022	Allsvenskan	14	0	1	0	―		0	0	―		15	0
IF Elfsborg	2023	Allsvenskan	29	0	0	0	―		―		―		29	0
IF Elfsborg	Total		48	0	1	0	―		0	0	―		49	0
Brentford	2024–25	Premier League	2	0	1	0	2	0	―		―		5	0
Brentford	2025–26	Premier League	1	0	2	0	4	0	―		―		7	0
Brentford	2026–27	Premier League	0	0	0	0	1	0	―		―		1	0
Brentford	Total		3	0	3	0	7	0	―		―		13	0
Career total			116	0	9	0	21	0	0	0	0	0	146	0

=== International ===
As of match played 16 November 2026

Appearances and goals by national team and year
National team	Year	Apps	Goals
Iceland	2022	3	0
Iceland	2023	2	0
Iceland	2024	12	0
Iceland	2025	3	0
Iceland	2026	8	0
Total		28	0

== Honours ==
Grótta

- 1. deild: 2019

Individual

- Allsvenskan Goalkeeper of the year: 2023
