= Gustavo Nunes =

Brazilian footballer (born 2005)

- Nunes playing for Brentford U21 in 2026

Personal information
- Full name: Gustavo Nunes Fernandes Gomes
- Date of birth: 20 November 2005 (age 20)
- Place of birth: São Vicente, Brazil
- Height: 1.73 m (5 ft 8 in)
- Position: Left winger

Team information
- Current team: Brentford
- Number: 39

Youth career
- 2021–2024: Grêmio

Senior career*
| Years | Team | Apps | (Gls) |
| 2024 | Grêmio | 30 | (4) |
| 2024– | Brentford | 3 | (0) |
| 2026 | → Swansea City (loan) | 12 | (0) |
- * Club domestic league appearances and goals as of 20:01, 31 May 2026 (UTC)

Gustavo Nunes Fernandes Gomes (born 20 November 2005), known as Gustavo Nunes, is a Brazilian professional footballer who plays as a left winger for Premier League club Brentford.

== Club career ==
=== Grêmio ===
Born in São Vicente, São Paulo, Gustavo Nunes joined Grêmio's youth setup in 2021, aged 15. On 8 February 2024, after already playing three senior matches in the Copa FGF, he signed a new contract with the club until 2028.

Gustavo Nunes made his first team debut on 11 February 2024, coming on as a first-half substitute for injured Jhonata Robert and providing the assist for Everton Galdino's equaliser in a 1–1 Campeonato Gaúcho home draw against São Luiz. He scored his first goal six days later, netting the opener in a 6–2 home routing of Santa Cruz-RS.

Gustavo Nunes made his Série A debut on 14 April 2024, replacing Yeferson Soteldo in a 2–1 away loss to Vasco da Gama. He scored his first goal in the category on 16 June, netting the equaliser in a 2–1 home loss to Botafogo.

=== Brentford ===
On 28 August 2024, it was announced that Gustavo Nunes had joined Premier League side Brentford on a six-year deal, with an additional two-year option.

On 12 April 2025, Nunes made his first appearance for Brentford, as an 89th-minute substitute for Christian Norgaard, in a 1–1 league draw with Arsenal.

On 22 January 2026, Nunes joined Championship side Swansea City on loan until the end of the season.

== Career statistics ==
As of 8 February 2026

Appearances and goals by club, season and competition
| Club | Season | League | | | State league (Note: Includes Campeonato Gaúcho) | | National cup (Note: Includes Copa do Brasil, FA Cup) | | League cup (Note: Includes EFL Cup) | | Continental | | Other | | Total | |
| Club | Season | Division | Apps | Goals | Apps | Goals | Apps | Goals | Apps | Goals | Apps | Goals | Apps | Goals | Apps | Goals |
|---|---|---|---|---|---|---|---|---|---|---|---|---|---|---|---|---|
| Grêmio | 2023 | Série A | 0 | 0 | 0 | 0 | 0 | 0 | — | | — | | 3 (Note: Appearances in Copa FGF) | 0 | 3 | 0 |
| Grêmio | 2024 | Série A | 20 | 3 | 10 | 1 | 3 | 1 | — | | 7 (Note: Appearances in Copa Libertadores) | 2 | — | | 40 | 7 |
| Grêmio | Total | | 20 | 3 | 10 | 1 | 3 | 1 | — | | 7 | 2 | 3 | 0 | 43 | 7 |
| Brentford | 2024–25 | Premier League | 3 | 0 | — | | 0 | 0 | 0 | 0 | — | | — | | 3 | 0 |
| Brentford | 2025–26 | Premier League | 0 | 0 | — | | 1 | 0 | 1 | 0 | — | | — | | 2 | 0 |
| Brentford | Total | | 3 | 0 | — | | 1 | 0 | 1 | 0 | — | | — | | 5 | 0 |
| Swansea City (loan) | 2025–26 | EFL Championship | 3 | 0 | — | | — | | — | | — | | — | | 3 | 0 |
| Career total | | | 26 | 3 | 10 | 1 | 4 | 1 | 1 | 0 | 7 | 2 | 3 | 0 | 51 | 7 |

== Honours ==
Grêmio

- Campeonato Gaúcho: 2024
