= Benjamin Arthur (footballer) =

English footballer (born 2005)

- Arthur after a Portsmouth match in 2026

Personal information
- Full name: Benjamin Kristian Arthur
- Date of birth: 9 October 2005 (age 21)
- Place of birth: Warwickshire, England
- Height: 1.92 m (6 ft 4 in)
- Position: Central defender

Team information
- Current team: Portsmouth (on loan from Brentford)
- Number: 2

Youth career
- Leamington Hibernian
- Coventry Sphinx
- –2023: Peterborough United
- 2023–2025: Brentford

Senior career*
Years	Team	Apps	(Gls)
2025–	Brentford	0	(0)
2026	→ Celtic (loan)	4	(0)
2026–	→ Portsmouth (loan)	6	(0)

International career
2023	England U18	3	(0)
2024	England U19	1	(0)
2025	England U20	1	(0)
- * Club domestic league appearances and goals as of 15:47, 23 September 2026 (UTC)

Benjamin Kristian Arthur (born 9 October 2005) is an English professional footballer who plays as a central defender for EFL Championship club Portsmouth, on loan from Premier League club Brentford.

Arthur is a product of the Peterborough United academy and began his professional career with Brentford in 2023. He has been capped by England at youth level.

== Club career ==
=== Early years ===
Initially a midfielder, Arthur began his youth career with Leamington Hibernian and Coventry Sphinx, before entering the Peterborough United academy at the age of 13. Despite "injury and other struggles" and with the club considering his release, he progressed to sign a scholarship deal in 2022 and was a central defender in the 2022–23 U18 Professional Development League Cup-winning U18 squad. Shortly after winning his maiden call into a first team matchday squad, Arthur turned down a "substantial offer" to sign a professional contract and departed London Road on 31 August 2023.

=== Brentford ===
On 31 August 2023, Arthur transferred to the B team at Premier League club Brentford and signed a three-year contract for an undisclosed fee. The fee was reported to be "close to £1 million" and "nearly a record for a League One scholar, plus millions in add-ons". Arthur missed the first half of the 2023–24 season with a stress fracture to his back and returned to match play in early January 2024. An injury crisis in defence saw Arthur win his maiden call into the first team squad for a Premier League match versus Arsenal on 9 March 2024. He remained an unused substitute during the 2–1 defeat.

Following an injury suffered during the 2024 off-season, Arthur returned to match play with the B team on 23 September 2024. He made 27 appearances during the 2024–25 season and was a part of the Professional Development League-winning squad. Arthur's performances were recognised with the club's U21 Player of the Year award. Arthur was an unused substitute in five first team matchday squads during the 2024–25 season.

In July 2025, Arthur was promoted to the first team squad and signed a new six-year contract, with the option of a further year. He made three cup appearances during the first half of the 2025–26 season, before joining Scottish Premiership club Celtic on loan for the remainder of the season on the final day of the winter transfer window. Arthur made 6 appearances during the remainder of the 2025–26 league and cup double-winning season.

On 12 August 2026, Arthur joined Championship club Portsmouth on loan for the duration of the 2026–27 season. He made six appearances prior to suffering a stress fracture in his back in mid-September.

== International career ==
Arthur was part of England's U18 squad at the 2023 International Tournament of Lisbon and he appeared in each of the team's three matches at the tournament. He won his maiden U19 call-up for a training camp and two friendlies in September 2023, but was not named in either matchday squad. Arthur received his second call-up for two friendlies in March 2024 and won his only U19 cap with a start in a 3–2 defeat to the United States. Arthur won his maiden U20 cap with a start in a friendly versus Japan on 14 November 2025.

== Personal life ==
Arthur is of Ghanaian descent through his father. He grew up in Lillington, Warwickshire. While a Brentford B player, Arthur shared accommodation with teammate Ashley Hay.

== Career statistics ==
As of match played 19 September 2026

Appearances and goals by club, season and competition
Club	Season	League			National cup (Note: Includes FA Cup, Scottish Cup)		League cup (Note: Includes EFL Cup)		Total	
Club	Season	Division	Apps	Goals	Apps	Goals	Apps	Goals	Apps	Goals
Peterborough United	2023–24	League One	0	0	―		0	0	0	0
Brentford	2023–24	Premier League	0	0	0	0	0	0	0	0
Brentford	2024–25	Premier League	0	0	0	0	0	0	0	0
Brentford	2025–26	Premier League	0	0	1	0	2	0	3	0
Brentford	Total		0	0	1	0	2	0	3	0
Celtic (loan)	2025–26	Scottish Premiership	4	0	2	0	―		6	0
Portsmouth (loan)	2026–27	Championship	6	0	0	0	0	0	6	0
Career total			10	0	3	0	2	0	15	0

== Honours ==
Celtic

- Scottish Premiership: 2025–26

Individual

- Brentford U21 Player of the Year: 2024–25
