= Igor Thiago =

Brazilian footballer (born 2001)

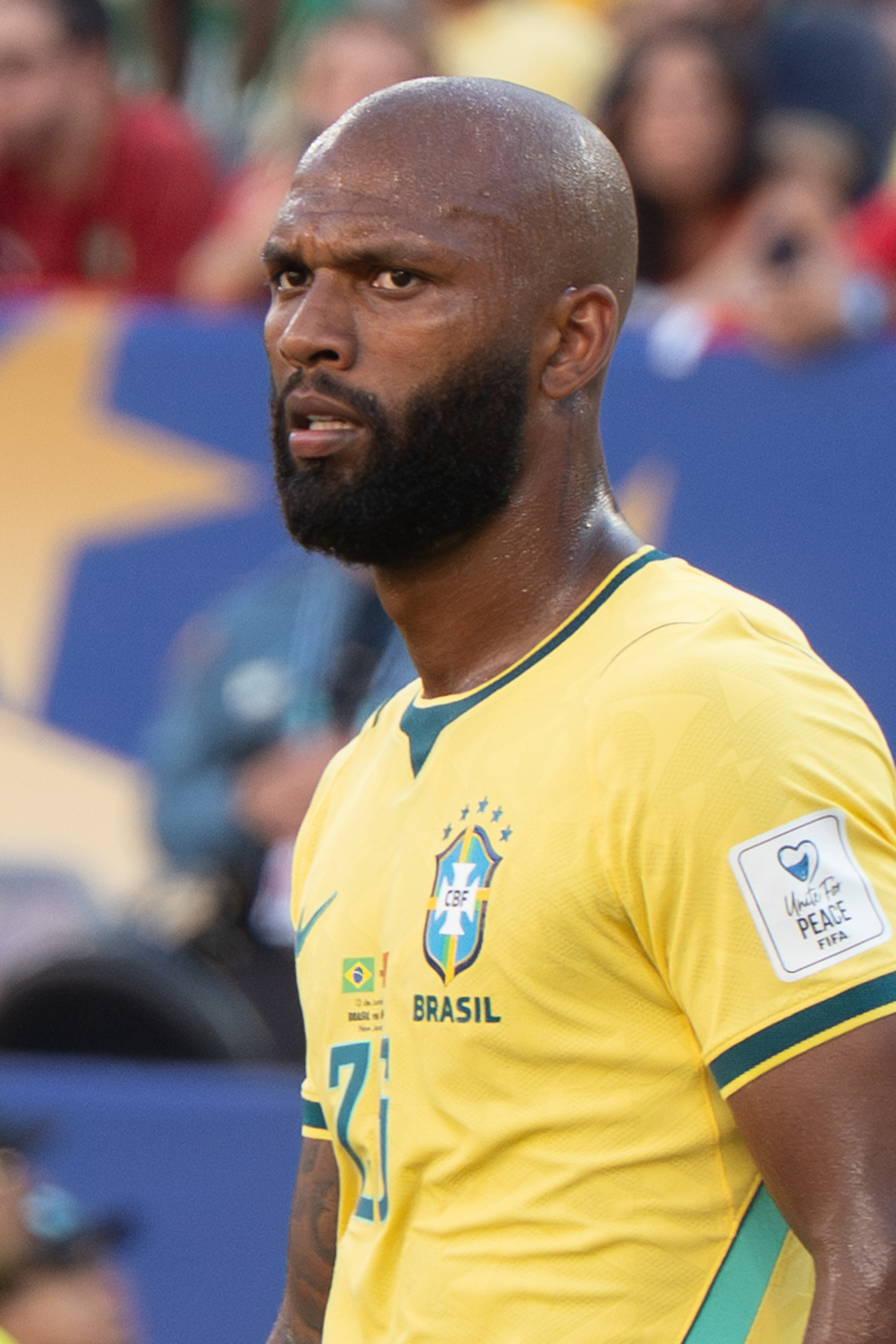
- Thiago with Brazil in 2026

Personal information
- Full name: Igor Thiago Nascimento Rodrigues
- Date of birth: 26 June 2001 (age 25)
- Place of birth: Gama, Federal District, Brazil
- Height: 1.90 m (6 ft 3 in)
- Position: Striker

Team information
- Current team: Brentford
- Number: 9

Youth career
- Gremio Ocidental
- 2010–2019: Verê
- 2019–2020: Cruzeiro

Senior career*
| Years | Team | Apps | (Gls) |
| 2020–2022 | Cruzeiro | 60 | (9) |
| 2022 | Ludogorets Razgrad II | 4 | (3) |
| 2022–2023 | Ludogorets Razgrad | 34 | (16) |
| 2023–2024 | Club Brugge | 34 | (18) |
| 2024– | Brentford | 55 | (24) |

International career^{‡}
| 2026– | Brazil | 5 | (2) |
- * Club domestic league appearances and goals as of 02:11, 31 October 2026 (UTC) ‡ National team caps and goals as of 03:20, 14 June 2026 (UTC)

Igor Thiago Nascimento Rodrigues (born 26 June 2001), known simply as Igor Thiago (Brazilian Portuguese pronunciation: [ˈiɡoʁ tʃiˈaɡu]), is a Brazilian professional footballer who plays as a striker for Premier League club Brentford and the Brazil national team.

== Early life ==
Igor Thiago was born in Gama, Federal District, and was 13 years old when he lost his father, and supported his street-cleaner mother María Diva by working in construction as a bricklayer, odd-jobbing at fairs, and by handing out flyers.

He did not consider a career in football, but began playing at Gremio Ocidental, where his brother was already a player. He started playing futsal and had trials at several teams before joining the under-17 team of Verê, from the interior of Paraná, when he was sixteen. He later joined Cruzeiro's academy in 2019.

== Club career ==
=== Cruzeiro ===
On 22 January 2020, Thiago made his professional debut as an 18-year-old when he started for Cruzeiro in their Campeonato Mineiro match against Boa Esporte.

During his three years with the club, Thiago scored 10 goals in 64 appearances.

=== Ludogorets Razgrad ===
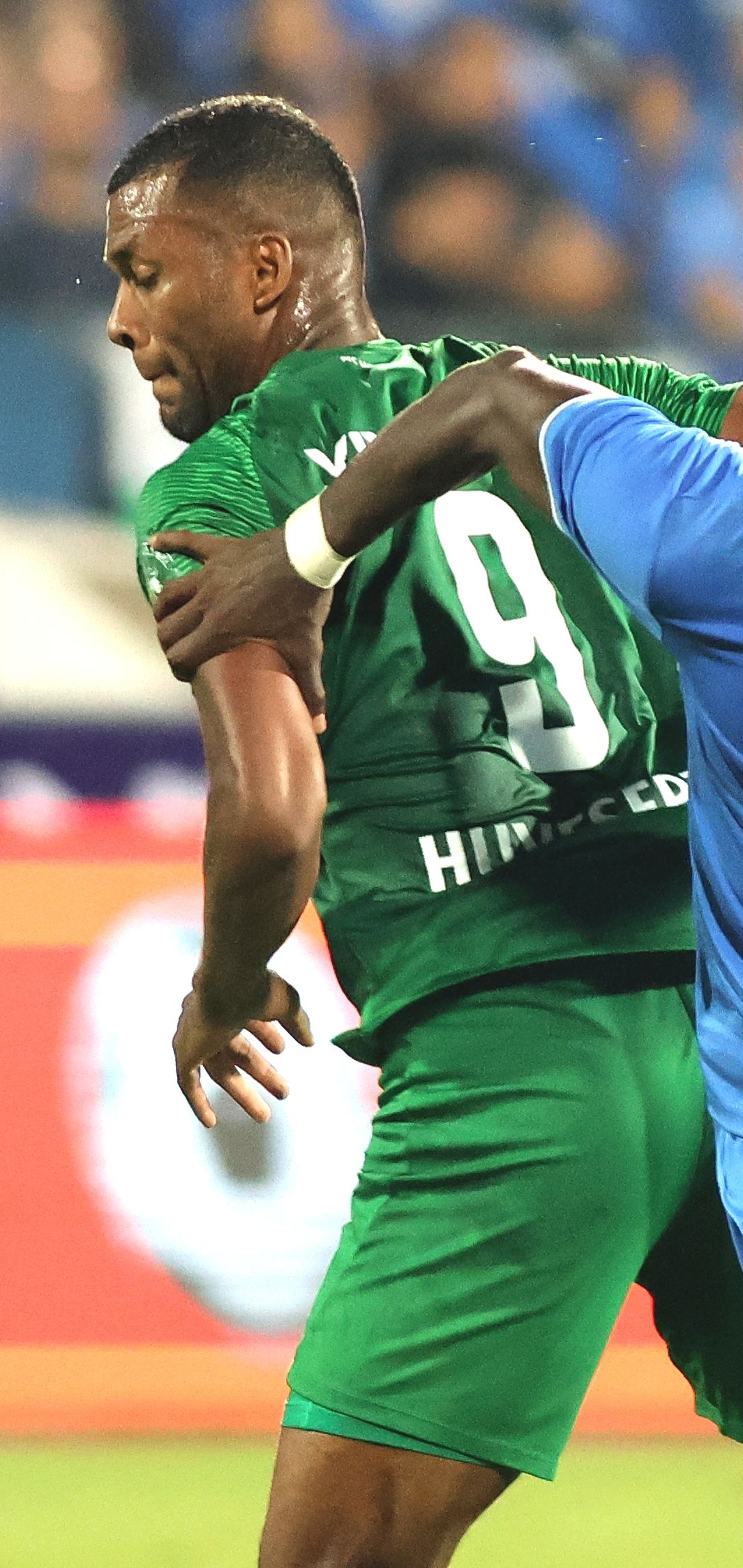
Igor Thiago playing for Ludogorets Razgrad in 2022

After a series of rumours, on 2 March 2022, Thiago finally signed with the Bulgarian champions Ludogorets Razgrad. He joined Ludogorets II in order to adapt to the Bulgarian league and made his debut on 18 April in a league match against Litex Lovech, scoring his first goal. A week later, he scored a brace in a 3–2 away defeat against Dobrudzha Dobrich.

Thiago's good start for the second team granted him a call-up to the first team where he made his debut in a league match against CSKA Sofia, coming on as a substitute and marking his debut for the first team with a goal.

With Ludogorets, Thiago won back-to-back Bulgarian First League titles for 2021–22 and 2022–23, as well as the 2023 Bulgarian Cup and 2022 Bulgarian Supercup, contributing to the club's success with 21 goals in 55 games.

=== Club Brugge ===
On 12 June 2023, Thiago signed for Belgian Pro League club Club Brugge on a four-year contract. The €7.9 million fee received by Ludogorets was a record for a Bulgarian club.

Having started in a 3–0 win over Aarhus in the UEFA Conference League qualifiers on 27 July 2023, Thiago scored in his first two league games for Club Brugge, a late equaliser to earn a 1–1 draw against Mechelen, then netting the only goal in a 1–0 win at Westerlo to put the club near the top of the table early in the season.

Scoring the opening goal in a 4–2 win over Charleroi on 16 September 2023 saw him reach six goals in all competitions, but Thiago didn't score in Club's next nine games, finally breaking his duck in a 6–0 Belgian Cup victory at Beerschot on 1 November. However, there were no more league goals until December of that year.

He netted a double in a 5–0 away win over Beşiktaş in the Conference League which sparked a major goalscoring run from the Brazilian striker, going on to fire 18 goals in his next 12 games across December 2023 and January 2024. Thiago was only shut out in one of those matches, against Mechelen where a header he scored was erroneously ruled out for offside. After that blank, Thiago scored in his next eight games.

=== Brentford ===
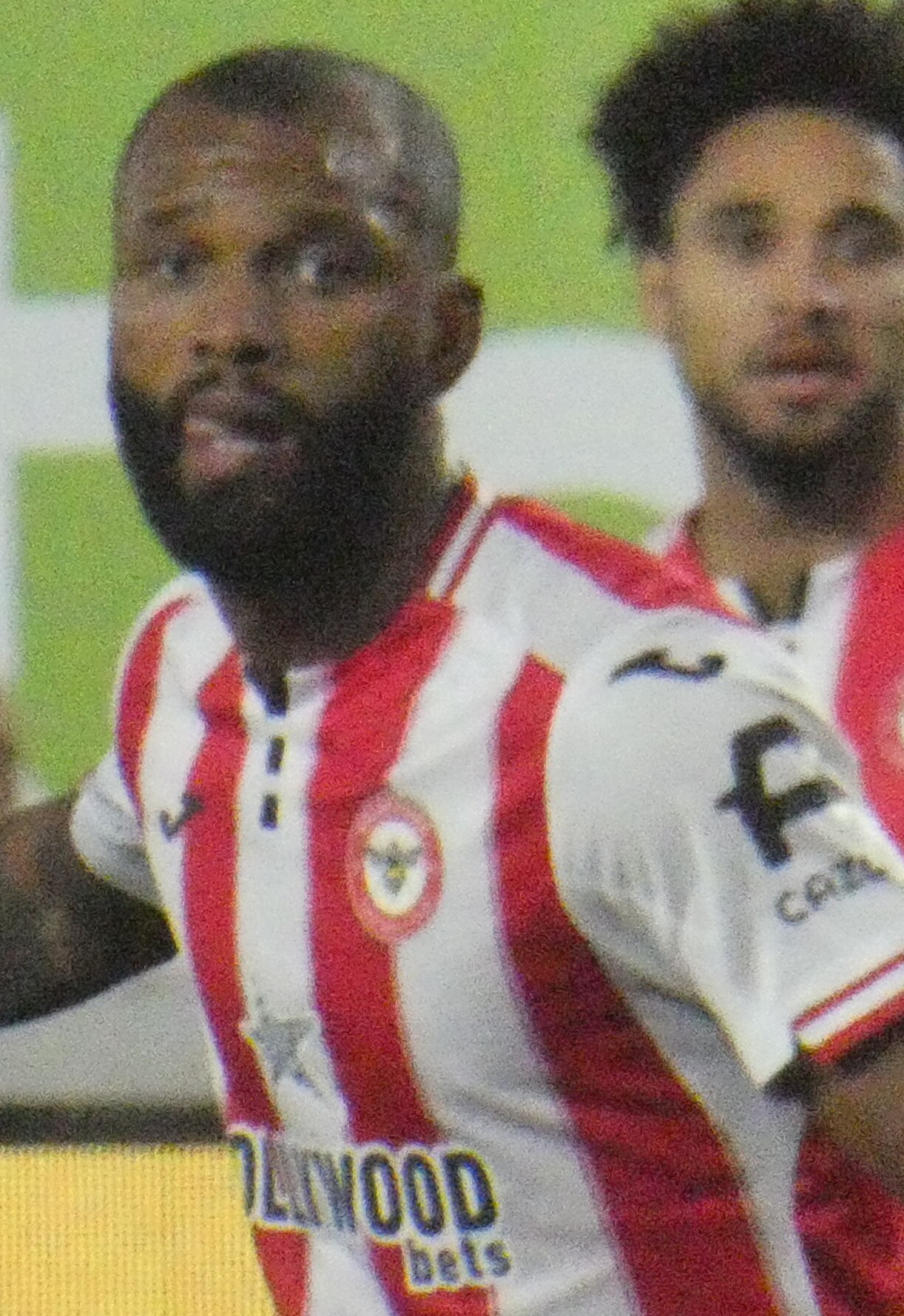
Igor Thiago playing for Brentford in 2025

On 14 February 2024, Premier League club Brentford announced an agreement for the signing of Thiago on a five-year deal, which would come into effect on 1 July. The fee was undisclosed by the club, but reported to be in the region of a club-record £30 million. In Belgian terms, this was a new Pro League record sale of €38 million.

On 20 July 2024, Thiago suffered a meniscus injury on his Brentford debut in a pre-season friendly, and was subsequently expected to be out of action for the remainder of the year. However, on 23 November, Thiago made his first appearance for the club against Everton, when he replaced Yoane Wissa in the 72nd minute. Despite the brief return, he missed most of the remainder of the 2024–25 season, only making his return on 4 May 2025 in Brentford's 4–3 home victory against Manchester United in the league.

On 17 August 2025, Thiago scored his first goal for Brentford in a 3–1 away defeat against Nottingham Forest in the club's opening game of the 2025–26 season. On 27 September, Thiago scored a first half double in a 3–1 victory against Manchester United. In November that year, he won the Premier League Player of the Month after, having scored five goals in four matches for his club.

He scored his first hat-trick for the Bees in a 4–2 away win at Everton on 4 January 2026. Three days later, a brace against Sunderland in a 3–0 victory for Brentford brought Thiago's season tally to 16 goals, making him the highest-scoring Brazilian player in a single Premier League season. When questioned by Jonathan Pearce, Brentford manager Keith Andrews spoke about how Thiago has "earned his journey; he's had to graft" in his footballing career. On 11 April 2026, he scored twice in a 2–2 draw against Everton, taking his Premier League tally to 21 goals for the season and surpassing the club records previously held by Ivan Toney and Bryan Mbeumo. He concluded the season with 22 goals, finishing second only to Erling Haaland in the scoring charts.

== International career ==
Thiago playing for Brazil at the 2026 FIFA World Cup

Born in Brazil, Thiago received a Bulgarian passport in 2023, which made him available to play for Bulgaria, subject to a five-year residency requirement, in addition to the Brazil national team. In January 2024 he received a call-up for Brazil U23, but declined it reportedly to keep his international options open, despite the fact he said it would be a dream to represent Brazil on international level.

On 16 March 2026, sitting as the Premier League's second-highest scorer behind only Erling Haaland, Thiago earned his first call-up to the Brazil national team for friendlies against France and Croatia. On 18 May 2026, Thiago was selected for Brazil's squad for the 2026 FIFA World Cup.

== Career statistics ==
=== Club ===
As of match played 31 October 2026

Appearances and goals by club, season and competition
| Club | Season | League | | | State league (Note: Includes Campeonato Mineiro) | | National cup (Note: Includes Copa do Brasil, Bulgarian Cup, Belgian Cup, FA Cup) | | League cup (Note: Includes EFL Cup) | | Continental | | Other | | Total | |
| Club | Season | Division | Apps | Goals | Apps | Goals | Apps | Goals | Apps | Goals | Apps | Goals | Apps | Goals | Apps | Goals |
|---|---|---|---|---|---|---|---|---|---|---|---|---|---|---|---|---|
| Cruzeiro | 2020 | Série B | 18 | 0 | 6 | 3 | 3 | 0 | — | | — | | — | | 27 | 3 |
| Cruzeiro | 2021 | Série B | 25 | 4 | 4 | 0 | 0 | 0 | — | | — | | — | | 29 | 4 |
| Cruzeiro | 2022 | Série B | 0 | 0 | 7 | 2 | 1 | 1 | — | | — | | — | | 8 | 3 |
| Cruzeiro | Total | | 43 | 4 | 17 | 5 | 4 | 1 | — | | — | | — | | 64 | 10 |
| Ludogorets Razgrad II | 2021–22 | Bulgarian Second League | 4 | 3 | — | | — | | — | | — | | — | | 4 | 3 |
| Ludogorets Razgrad | 2021–22 | Bulgarian First League | 2 | 1 | — | | 0 | 0 | — | | — | | — | | 2 | 1 |
| Ludogorets Razgrad | 2022–23 | Bulgarian First League | 32 | 15 | — | | 5 | 1 | — | | 15 (Note: Five appearances and one goal in UEFA Champions League, eight appearances and one goal in UEFA Europa League, two appearances and two goals in UEFA Europa Conference League) | 4 | 1 (Note: Appearance in Bulgarian Supercup) | 0 | 53 | 20 |
| Ludogorets Razgrad | Total | | 34 | 16 | — | | 5 | 1 | — | | 15 | 4 | 1 | 0 | 55 | 21 |
| Club Brugge | 2023–24 | Belgian Pro League | 34 | 18 | — | | 5 | 4 | — | | 16 (Note: Appearances in UEFA Europa Conference League) | 7 | — | | 55 | 29 |
| Brentford | 2024–25 | Premier League | 8 | 0 | — | | 0 | 0 | 0 | 0 | — | | — | | 8 | 0 |
| Brentford | 2025–26 | Premier League | 38 | 22 | — | | 1 | 2 | 1 | 1 | — | | — | | 40 | 25 |
| Brentford | 2026–27 | Premier League | 9 | 2 | — | | 0 | 0 | 3 | 2 | — | | — | | 12 | 4 |
| Brentford | Total | | 55 | 24 | — | | 1 | 2 | 4 | 3 | — | | — | | 60 | 29 |
| Career total | | | 170 | 65 | 17 | 5 | 15 | 8 | 4 | 3 | 31 | 11 | 1 | 0 | 238 | 92 |

=== International ===
As of match played 13 June 2026

Appearances and goals by national team and year
| National team | Year | Apps | Goals |
|---|---|---|---|
| Brazil | 2026 | 5 | 2 |
| Total | | 5 | 2 |

Scores and results list Brazil's goal tally first.

List of international goals scored by Igor Thiago
| No. | Date | Venue | Cap | Opponent | Score | Result | Competition |
|---|---|---|---|---|---|---|---|
| 1 | 31 March 2026 | Camping World Stadium, Orlando, United States | 2 | Croatia | 2–1 | 3–1 | Friendly |
| 2 | 31 May 2026 | Estádio do Maracanã, Rio de Janeiro, Brazil | 3 | Panama | 5–1 | 6–2 | Friendly |

== Honours ==
Ludogorets Razgrad

- Bulgarian First League: 2021–22, 2022–23
- Bulgarian Cup: 2022–23
- Bulgarian Supercup: 2022

Club Brugge

- Belgian Pro League: 2023–24

Individual

- UEFA Europa Conference League Young Player of the Season: 2023–24
- Premier League Player of the Month: November 2025, January 2026
- Premier League Fan Team of the Season: 2025–26
- Brentford Player of the Year: 2025–26
- PFA Team of the Year: 2025–26 Premier League
