= Luka Bentt =

Association football player (born 2007)

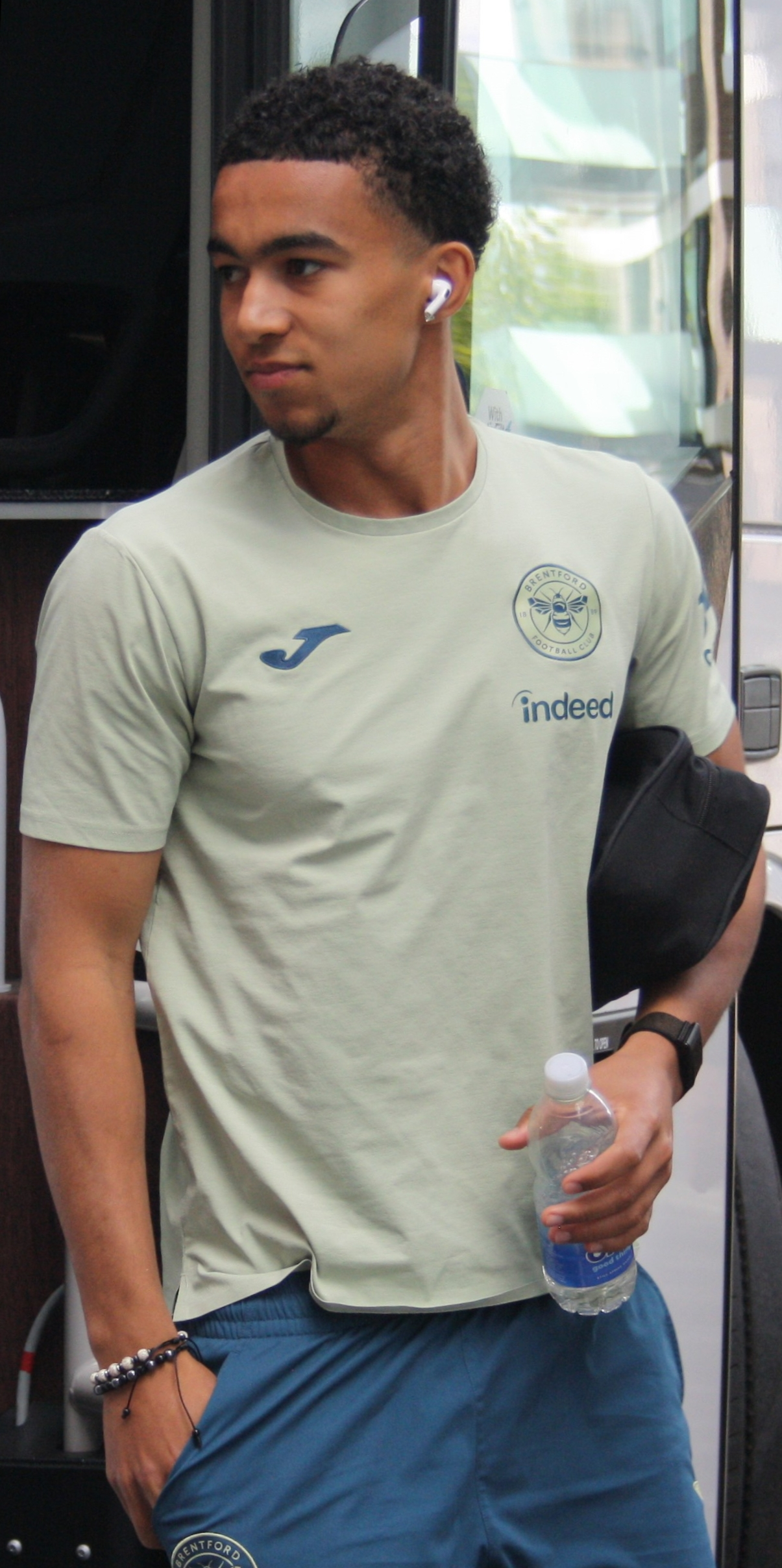
- Bentt prior to a Brentford B match in 2026

Personal information
- Full name: Luka Maxime Deyne Bentt
- Date of birth: 1 October 2007 (age 19)
- Place of birth: Washington, D.C., United States
- Height: 1.84 m (6 ft 0 in)
- Position: Midfielder

Team information
- Current team: Brentford

Youth career
- c. 2017: Bethesda SC
- Achilles
- D.C. United
- –2024: Cre8tive Academy
- 2024–: Brentford

Senior career*
Years	Team	Apps	(Gls)
2026–	Brentford	0	(0)

International career^{‡}
2025–	Belgium U19	9	(1)
- * Club domestic league appearances and goals as of 23:13, 6 October 2026 (UTC) ‡ National team caps and goals as of 11:27, 29 March 2026 (UTC)

Luka Maxime Deyne Bentt (born 1 October 2007) is a professional footballer who plays as a midfielder for Premier League club Brentford.

Bentt is a product of the D.C. United and Brentford academies and began his professional career with the latter club in 2025. Born in the United States, Bentt has been capped by Belgium at youth international level.

== Club career ==
A midfielder, Bentt had a nomadic youth career in his native United States, with Bethesda SC, Achilles and D.C. United. He moved to England at age 15 and joined the Cre8tive Academy. In February 2024, Bentt joined Brentford U18 on trial and was part of the squad for a training camp and matches in Spain. He signed a two-year scholarship with the club in advance of the 2024–25 season. A twice-torn hip flexor saw Bentt miss much of the first half of the 2024–25 U18 season, before he returned to fitness and progressed to make two U21 appearances in March 2025. He ended the U18 season with 19 appearances and three goals. Prior to a Premier League match versus Aston Villa, Bentt participated in a first team training session, where he mimicked the play of opposition player Ollie Watkins.

Bentt was part of the B team squad during the 2025–26 pre-season and made two friendly appearances during the period. He made a first team appearance in a behind closed doors pre-season friendly and signed a professional contract in August 2025. Bentt was an unused substitute in 9 first team matches during the 2025–26 season and made one appearance, as a substitute late in a 1–0 FA Cup fourth round victory over Macclesfield on 16 February 2026. At B team level, he was part of the squad which finished the 2025–26 season as league phase champions of the Professional U21 Development League. In recognition of his performances at youth level during the season, Bentt was named Brentford's Scholar of the Year by the Premier League. He signed a new contract in August 2026 and returned to competitive match play in mid-September. Bentt suffered a serious injury during an EFL Trophy group stage match versus Milton Keynes Dons on 7 October.

== International career ==
Bentt is eligible to play for the United States, Belgium and England at international level. He won his maiden call into the Belgium U19 squad for a pair of friendlies in September 2025 and appeared in both, scoring one goal.

== Personal life ==
Bentt grew up in Washington, D.C. and lived there until moving to England at the age of 15. He is of Belgian descent on his mother's side. In addition to his native English, Bentt speaks French, Spanish and Portuguese.

== Career statistics ==
As of match played 6 October 2026

Appearances and goals by club, season and competition
Club	Season	League			FA Cup		EFL Cup		Other		Total	
Club	Season	Division	Apps	Goals	Apps	Goals	Apps	Goals	Apps	Goals	Apps	Goals
Brentford	2025–26	Premier League	0	0	1	0	0	0	—		1	0
Brentford U21	2026–27	—							2 (Note: Appearances in EFL Trophy)	0	2	0
Career total			0	0	1	0	0	0	2	0	3	0

== Honours ==
- Brentford Premier League Scholar of the Year: 2025–26
