= Kim Ji-soo (footballer) =

South Korean footballer (born 2004)

- Ji-soo with Brentford U21 in 2026

Personal information
- Date of birth: 24 December 2004 (age 21)
- Place of birth: Bucheon, South Korea
- Height: 1.92 m (6 ft 4 in)
- Position: Centre-back

Team information
- Current team: Brentford
- Number: 36

Youth career
- 2017–2022: Seongnam FC (Note: Played for Seongnam FC U15 from 2017 to 2019, and Pungsaeng High School from 2020 to 2022, which were academies of Seongnam FC.)
- 2023–2024: Brentford

Senior career*
Years	Team	Apps	(Gls)
2022–2023	Seongnam FC	20	(0)
2024–	Brentford	3	(0)
2025–2026	→ 1. FC Kaiserslautern (loan)	17	(0)

International career^{‡}
2019–2020	South Korea U17	16	(1)
2023	South Korea U20	11	(0)
2023–	South Korea U23	12	(1)
2026–	South Korea	2	(0)
Medal record
Men's football
Representing South Korea
Asian Games
Gold medal – first place	2026 Aichi–Nagoya
- * Club domestic league appearances and goals as of 17 April 2026 ‡ National team caps and goals as of 17 November 2026

Kim Ji-soo (Korean: 김지수; born 24 December 2004) is a South Korean professional footballer who plays as a centre-back for Premier League club Brentford and the South Korea national team.

== Club career ==
=== Seongnam FC ===
Kim joined the youth academy of Seongnam FC and worked his way up their youth categories. On 7 February 2022, he signed his first semi-professional contract with the club ahead of the 2022 K League 1 season. In doing so, he became the club's first ever semi-pro player, as well as their youngest registered player in the league that season. On 18 October 2022, he was registered as a fully professional player. He made 19 appearances in his debut season with Seongnam, earning interest from clubs abroad.

=== Brentford ===
On 26 June 2023, Kim joined Premier League club Brentford for an undisclosed fee, signing a four-year contract with the club, with an option for an additional year, and being assigned to the B team. During a season at the B team, he was on the list of senior squad in eight Premier League matches, but did not make his senior debut.

On 7 June 2024, Kim was officially promoted to the senior team, becoming the first-ever Korean centre-back to be affiliated to a Premier League club. He made his Premier League debut on 27 December, coming on as a 76th minute substitute for Ben Mee in a match against Brighton & Hove Albion.

==== Loan to 1. FC Kaiserslautern ====
On 22 July 2025, Kim was loaned by 2. Bundesliga club 1. FC Kaiserslautern, moving to Germany. He could qualify as a homegrown player if he stayed in England for one more season, but he chose immediate experience on the field after manager Thomas Frank, who had asked him to stay at the club, left for Tottenham Hotspur. However, Kim injured his thigh in a league match against Fortuna Düsseldorf on 2 November, and suffered a relapse two months after starting rehabilitation.

== International career ==
In 2023, Kim played for the South Korea national under-20 team at the AFC U-20 Asian Cup and the FIFA U-20 World Cup, and helped his country reach the semi-finals at both competitions. In August of that year, he received his first call-up to the senior national team by manager Jürgen Klinsmann, for two friendly matches against Wales and Saudi Arabia.

Kim was selected for South Korea under-23s for the 2026 Asian Games between September and October. He played all five matches as a main centre-back, while South Korea won the tournament. He qualified for exemption from compulsory military service as an Asian Games gold medalist. The next month, he made his senior international debut in a 3–2 friendly loss to Saudi Arabia.

== Style of play ==
Kim is a centre-back who has power, height, and wide field of view. He is able to play with both feet, and is skilled in providing long-range passes. He has been frequently compared to Kim Min-jae in his country due to his playing style.

== Career statistics ==
=== Club ===
As of match played 17 April 2026

Appearances and goals by club, season and competition
Club	Season	League			National cup (Note: Includes Korean FA Cup, FA Cup, DFB-Pokal)		League cup (Note: Includes EFL Cup)		Continental		Other		Total	
Club	Season	Division	Apps	Goals	Apps	Goals	Apps	Goals	Apps	Goals	Apps	Goals	Apps	Goals
Seongnam FC	2022	K League 1	19	0	0	0	—		—		—		19	0
Seongnam FC	2023	K League 2	1	0	1	0	—		—		—		2	0
Seongnam FC	Total		20	0	1	0	0	0	0	0	0	0	21	0
Brentford	2024–25	Premier League	3	0	1	0	1	0	―		―		5	0
1. FC Kaiserslautern (loan)	2025–26	2. Bundesliga	17	0	1	1	―		―		―		18	1
Career total			40	0	3	1	1	0	0	0	0	0	44	1

== Honours ==
South Korea U23

- Asian Games: 2026

Individual

- K League All-Star: 2022
