= Benjamin Fredrick =

Nigerian footballer (born 2005)

Personal information
- Full name: Benjamin Chiemela Fredrick
- Date of birth: 28 May 2005 (age 21)
- Place of birth: Kaduna, Nigeria
- Height: 1.83 m (6 ft 0 in)
- Positions: Centre-back; right-back

Team information
- Current team: Brentford
- Number: 48

Youth career
- Simoiben Academy

Senior career*
Years	Team	Apps	(Gls)
2021–2022	ABS	10	(0)
2022–2024	Nasarawa United	6	(0)
2023–2024	→ Brentford (loan)	0	(0)
2024–	Brentford	0	(0)
2025–2026	→ Dender EH (loan)	14	(0)

International career^{‡}
2023	Nigeria U-20	11	(0)
2025–	Nigeria	9	(0)
- * Club domestic league appearances and goals as of 11 February 2026 ‡ National team caps and goals as of 23:16, 13 November 2026 (UTC)

Benjamin Chiemela Fredrick (born 28 May 2005) is a Nigerian footballer who plays as a centre-back or right-back for Premier League club Brentford, and the Nigeria national team.

== Club career ==
Fredrick is a graduate of the Simoiben Academy set up by professional footballer Moses Simon. Prior to the start of the 2021–22 season he joined ABS. He made his debut for them in February 2022 and was given the man of the match award. In October 2022 he was reported to have joined Nigeria Professional Football League side Nasarawa United. He made his debut for Nasarawa in the NPFL during the 2022–23 season, playing both centre-back and right-back.

In August 2023, he signed for Premier League side Brentford on loan with the option to make the deal permanent. He was included in the Brentford first-team match day squad for the first time in January 2024, named as a substitute for an FA Cup tie against Wolverhampton Wanderers. In April 2024, it was reported that Brentford were turning the loan deal into a permanent transfer with Fredrick agreeing to a four-year contract.

On 25 July 2025, Fredrick joined Belgian Pro League club Dender EH on a season-long loan deal.

== International career ==
Fredrick featured for the Nigeria U-20 team that finished third at the 2023 U-20 Africa Cup of Nations held in Egypt in January 2023, playing every minute as his side reached the semi-final. In May 2023 he was named in the Nigeria squad for the 2023 FIFA U-20 World Cup.

Fredrick debuted with the senior Nigeria national team in a friendly 2–2 (4–5) penalty shootout win over Jamaica on 31 May 2025.

In December 2025, Fredrick was ruled out of the Nigeria squad for the 2025 Africa Cup of Nations due to an injury sustained shortly before the tournament.

== Career statistics ==
=== International ===
As of match played 13 November 2026

Appearances and goals by national team and year
National team	Year	Apps	Goals
Nigeria	2025	7	0
Nigeria	2026	2	0
Total		9	0
