= 2022–23 Premier League Cup =

Tournament details
- Country: England; Wales
- Teams: 32

Final positions
- Champions: Brentford (1st Title)
- Runners-up: Blackburn Rovers (2nd Runner Up Finish)

Tournament statistics
- Matches played: 111
- Goals scored: 384 (3.46 per match)
- Attendance: 23,060 (208 per match)
- Top goal scorer: (Republic of Ireland) Alex Gilbert Brentford (8 Goals)

The 2022–23 Premier League Cup was the ninth edition of the competition. The defending champions were West Bromwich Albion, who defeated Wolverhampton Wanderers on penalties in the previous final. This season saw the return of a Under-21 age limit, reduced from Under-23 the previous season, with clubs permitted to use five over-age outfield players and an over-age goalkeeper in order to help with the transition.

== Participants ==
32 participated in the competition this season, 4 fewer than the previous season. Mansfield Town, Salford City, and Stevenage did not return from last years competition only playing once, Oxford United, Plymouth Argyle, West Ham United, Wigan Athletic left after 3, 3, 2, and 2 consecutive seasons respectively, Southend United did not return after 6 straight seasons in the competition, Norwich City didn't return after playing last year, and Exeter City and Leeds United did not return after 4 consecutive seasons in the competition.

6 teams returned to the competition this season. Brentford returned after last playing 2015-2016, Brighton & Hove Albion and Cardiff City returned since 2017-2018, Bristol City returning since 2018-2019, Aston Villa, Crystal Palace, and Hull City returned after missing last season's competition. There are no new teams joining the competition this year.

=== Category 1 ===
- Arsenal
- Aston Villa
- Blackburn Rovers
- Brighton & Hove Albion
- Crystal Palace
- Derby County
- Everton
- Fulham
- Middlesbrough
- Newcastle United
- Nottingham Forest
- Southampton
- Stoke City
- Sunderland
- West Bromwich Albion
- Wolverhampton Wanderers

=== Category 2 ===
- Birmingham City
- Burnley
- Bristol City
- Cardiff City
- Charlton Athletic
- Colchester United
- Hull City
- Peterborough United
- Queens Park Rangers
- Reading
- Sheffield United
- Swansea City
- Watford

=== Category 3 ===
- AFC Bournemouth

=== Category 4 ===
- Brentford
- Huddersfield Town

== Group stage ==
The draw for the group stage took place on 15 August 2022. Teams play each other twice, with the group winners and runners–up advance to the round of 16.

=== Group A ===
Team	Pld	W	D	L	GF	GA	GD	Pts
Fulham	6	6	0	0	22	7	+15	18
Nottingham Forest	6	3	0	3	7	8	−1	9
Charlton Athletic	6	3	0	3	11	13	−2	9
Hull City	6	0	0	6	7	19	−12	0

Updated to match(es) played on 30 January 2023. Source:

6 September 2022	Charlton Athletic	1–3	Nottingham Forest	Dartford
14:00	Reilly 90+3'	Report	Konaté 2'; Larsson 33'; Taylor 56'	Stadium: Princes Park; Attendance: 105; Referee: Adrian Quelch

14 September 2022	Fulham	5–4	Hull City	New Malden
14:00	McFarlane 18'; Harris 26'; Pajaziti 60' (pen.); Godo 81'; Odutayo 90+3'	Report	Hinds 29', 58'; Hall 48'; Simms 70'	Stadium: Motspur Park; Attendance: 49; Referee: Adrian Quelch

11 November 2022	Nottingham Forest	0–2	Fulham	Alfreton
19:00		Report	Jasper 14', 82'	Stadium: North Street; Attendance: 121; Referee: Aaron Bannister

18 November 2022	Nottingham Forest	1–0	Hull City	Alfreton
19:00	Taylor 69'	Report		Stadium: North Street; Attendance: 125; Referee: Gareth Rhodes

28 November 2022	Hull City	0–6	Fulham	North Ferriby
12:00		Report	D'Auria-Henry 2'; Loupalo-Bi 5', 40'; Pajaziti 23'; Bowat 69'; Mills 85' (o.g.)	Stadium: Dransfield Stadium; Attendance: 52; Referee: Scott Jackson

28 November 2022	Nottingham Forest	1–2	Charlton Athletic	Alfreton
19:00	Salmon 84'	Report	Gavin 33'; Kanu 79'	Stadium: North Street; Attendance: 141; Referee: Farai Hallam

5 December 2022	Hull City	1–2	Charlton Athletic	North Ferriby
19:00	Chadwick 51'	Report	Elerewe 45'; Kamara 90+2'	Stadium: Dransfield Stadium; Attendance: 90; Referee: Matthew Dicicco

9 December 2022	Fulham	3–0	Nottingham Forest	New Malden
19:00	O'Neill 52'; Godo 74'; Pajaziti 78' (pen.)	Report		Stadium: Motspur Park; Attendance: 91; Referee: Aji Ajibola

16 December 2022	Fulham	4–2	Charlton Athletic	New Malden
19:00	Sanderson 21'; Jasper 65'; O'Connor 78' (o.g.); Dibley-Dias 90+1'	Report	Gavin 35'; Kanu 42'	Stadium: Motspur Park; Attendance: 61; Referee: Reubyn Ricardo

21 December 2022	Charlton Athletic	1–2	Fulham	Dartford
13:00	Anderson 43'	Report	Sanderson 28'; Godo 56'	Stadium: Princes Park; Attendance: 68; Referee: Steven Hughes

5 January 2023	Charlton Athletic	3–2	Hull City	Dartford
13:00	Anderson 37'; Gavin 40' (pen.), 61' (pen.)	Report	Green 11'; Hinds 49'	Stadium: Princes Park; Attendance: 143; Referee: Aji Ajibola
Note: Originally scheduled for 12 December 2022, but was postponed due to a frozen pitch.

30 January 2023	Hull City	0–2	Nottingham Forest	North Ferriby
19:00		Report	Larsson 64' (pen.), 81'	Stadium: Dransfield Stadium; Attendance: 145; Referee: Michael Barlow
Note: Match scheduled for 19 December 2022, but was postponed after a failed pitch inspection.

=== Group B ===
Team	Pld	W	D	L	GF	GA	GD	Pts
Derby County	6	3	2	1	10	5	+5	11
Queens Park Rangers	6	2	2	2	9	8	+1	8
Brighton & Hove Albion	6	2	2	2	8	9	−1	8
AFC Bournemouth	6	2	0	4	6	11	−5	6

Updated to match(es) played on 27 January 2023. Source:

17 August 2022	Brighton & Hove Albion	0–3	AFC Bournemouth	Lancing
19:00		Report	Popoola 55'; Adu-Adjei 58'; Saydee 62'	Stadium: Elite Performance Centre; Attendance: 108; Referee: Alan Young

23 September 2022	AFC Bournemouth	2–1	Derby County	Boscombe
19:00	Stephens 75'; Greenwood 87'	Report	Solomon 6'	Stadium: Dean Court; Attendance: 1,831; Referee: Dale Wootton

26 September 2022	Derby County	1–1	Queens Park Rangers	Loughborough
19:00	Haigh 86'	Report	Lloyd 26'	Stadium: Loughborough University Stadium; Attendance: 108; Referee: Aaron Bannister

14 November 2022	Queens Park Rangers	3–4	Brighton & Hove Albion	Perivale
19:00	Adarkwa 9'; Balaj 40'; Pedder 45'	Report	Moran 73', 90+6'; Wilson 77' (pen.); Baker-Boaitey 90'	Stadium: Reynolds Field; Attendance: 200; Referee: Gary Parsons

18 November 2022	Derby County	1–1	Brighton & Hove Albion	Loughborough
19:00	Kelly 90+3'	Report	Clark 84'	Stadium: Loughborough University Stadium; Attendance: 102; Referee: Wayne Cartmel

26 November 2022	AFC Bournemouth	0–2	Brighton & Hove Albion	Boscombe
13:00		Report	Hinshelwood 33'; Spong 35'	Stadium: Dean Court; Attendance: 1,716; Referee: Elliot Swallow

28 November 2022	Queens Park Rangers	0–2	Derby County	Perivale
19:00		Report	Cybulski 7'; Solomon 28'	Stadium: The Powerday Stadium; Attendance: 200; Referee: Lloyd Wood

9 December 2022	Brighton & Hove Albion	0–0	Queens Park Rangers	Lancing
19:00		Report		Stadium: Elite Performance Centre; Attendance: 85; Referee: Farai Hallam

12 December 2022	Derby County	3–0	AFC Bournemouth	Derby
19:00	Robinson 26'; Wheeldon 50'; Brown 76'	Report		Stadium: Derby County Football Academy; Attendance: 75; Referee: Greg Rollason

19 December 2022	AFC Bournemouth	0–2	Queens Park Rangers	Boscombe
19:00		Report	Aoraha 87'; Balaj 90+3'	Stadium: Dean Court; Attendance: 872; Referee: Gary Parsons

19 December 2022	Brighton & Hove Albion	1–2	Derby County	Lancing
19:00	Baker-Boaitey 45'	Report	Ibrahim 27'; Aghatise 69'	Stadium: Elite Performance Centre; Attendance: 87; Referee: Matthew Russell

27 January 2023	Queens Park Rangers	3–1	AFC Bournemouth	Perivale
20:00	Kargbo 25'; Ajose 49'; Dixon-Bonner 58'	Report	Tydeman 87'	Stadium: Reynolds Field; Attendance: 300; Referee: Jason Richardson
Note: Match was postponed on 21 November 2022, due to heavy rain.

=== Group C ===
Team	Pld	W	D	L	GF	GA	GD	Pts
Huddersfield Town	6	4	1	1	10	6	+4	13
Middlesbrough	6	3	0	3	8	9	−1	9
Watford	6	2	1	3	10	16	−6	7
West Bromwich Albion	6	2	0	4	11	8	+3	6

Updated to match(es) played on 5 January 2023. Source:

1 September 2022	West Bromwich Albion	4–0	Watford	Hednesford
13:00	Cleary 12'; Whitwell 45'; Andrews 57'; Malcolm 87'	Report		Stadium: Keys Park; Attendance: 67; Referee: Jason Richardson

3 September 2022	Middlesbrough	0–3	Huddersfield Town	Bishop Auckland
12:00		Report	Mahoney 8', 49', 57'	Stadium: Heritage Park; Attendance: 85; Referee: Daniel Middleton

4 October 2022	Watford	1–2	Huddersfield Town	Kings Langley
13:00	Adeyemo 71'	Report	Diarra 10', 81'	Stadium: Gaywood Park; Attendance: 102; Referee: Daniel Middleton

17 October 2022	Middlesbrough	2–1	West Bromwich Albion	Bishop Auckland
19:00	Willis 34'; Kavanagh 80'	Report	Malcolm 90+5'	Stadium: Heritage Park; Attendance: 135; Referee: Edward Duckworth

18 November 2022	Huddersfield Town	1–0	West Bromwich Albion	Huddersfield
19:00	Ayina 57'	Report		Stadium: John Smith's Stadium; Attendance: 299; Referee: Reubyn Ricardo

19 November 2022	Middlesbrough	4–0	Watford	Middlesbrough
11:00	Kavanagh 31', 35'; Hannah 45+2'; Bridge 90'	Report 1 Report 2		Stadium: Riverside Stadium; Attendance: Behind Closed doors Referee: Edward Duckworth

25 November 2022	Huddersfield Town	2–0	Middlesbrough	Huddersfield
13:00	Harratt 25'; Ondo 40'	Report		Stadium: John Smith's Stadium; Attendance: 123; Referee: Matthew Corlett

25 November 2022	Watford	4–3	West Bromwich Albion	Kings Langley
13:00	Blake 8', 10', 43'; Touray 47'	Report	Zohore 37', 60'; Higgins 86'	Stadium: Gaywood Park; Attendance: 68; Referee: Aji Ajibola

9 December 2022	Huddersfield Town	2–2	Watford	Huddersfield
19:00	Bright 24'; Harratt 69'	Report	Hunter 55' (pen.); Trialist 73'	Stadium: John Smith's Stadium; Attendance: 96; Referee: Andrew Miller

19 December 2022	West Bromwich Albion	3–0	Huddersfield Town	Hednesford
13:00	Cleary 8'; Richards 13'; Ashworth 34'	Report		Stadium: Keys Park; Attendance: 80; Referee: Aaron Bannister

20 December 2022	Watford	3–1	Middlesbrough	Kings Langley
13:30	Forde 47'; Trialist 55', 57'	Report	Finch 54'	Stadium: Gaywood Park; Attendance: 80; Referee: Aaron Jackson

5 January 2023	West Bromwich Albion	0–1	Middlesbrough	Hednesford
14:00		Report	Bilongo 89'	Stadium: Keys Park; Attendance: 50; Referee: Adrian Quelch
Note: Originally scheduled for 12 December 2022, but was postponed due to "unforeseen circumstances".

=== Group D ===
Team	Pld	W	D	L	GF	GA	GD	Pts
Brentford	6	5	0	1	15	9	+6	15
Blackburn Rovers	6	3	0	3	10	13	−3	9
Peterborough United	6	2	1	3	11	11	0	7
Aston Villa	6	1	1	4	10	13	−3	4

Updated to match(es) played on 3 February 2023. Source:

26 August 2022	Aston Villa	1–1	Peterborough United	Bodymoor Heath
19:00	Shakpoke 82'	Report	Hickinson 22'	Stadium: Bodymoor Heath Training Ground; Attendance: 420; Referee: Dane Mccarrick

13 September 2022	Blackburn Rovers	2–3	Brentford	Leyland
19:00	Leonard 42'; Markanday 53'	Report	Gilbert 35'; Jones 45+3'; Lisbie 85'	Stadium: County Ground; Attendance: 86; Referee: David Richardson

22 September 2022	Peterborough United	2–3	Blackburn Rovers	Stamford, Lincolnshire
19:00	Mensah 3'; Thomas 84'	Report	Leonard 9', 26', 31'	Stadium: Borderville Stadium; Attendance: 97; Referee: Wayne Cartmel

26 October 2022	Aston Villa	1–3	Brentford	Bodymoor Heath
19:00	O'Reilly 82'	Report	Gilbert 33', 58'; Lisbie 90+1'	Stadium: Bodymoor Heath Training Ground; Attendance: 305; Referee: Aaron Jackson

18 November 2022	Brentford	3–2	Peterborough United	Stevenage
19:00	Gilbert 9' (pen.); Trevitt 51', 59'	Report	Taylor 90+1', 90+2'	Stadium: Broadhall Way; Attendance: 153; Referee: Adrian Quelch

19 November 2022	Blackburn Rovers	2–1	Aston Villa	Leyland
13:00	Burns 56'; Wood 60'	Report	Young 4'	Stadium: County Ground; Attendance: 274; Referee: Daniel Middleton

26 November 2022	Brentford	1–2	Blackburn Rovers	Woking
15:00	Trevitt 15'	Report	Fyles 20', 25'	Stadium: Kingfield Stadium; Attendance: 177; Referee: Sam Mulhall

6 December 2022	Peterborough United	4–1	Aston Villa	Peterborough
13:00	Randall 24', 31'; Van Lier 57'; Taylor 90+5'	Report	Frith 87' (pen.)	Stadium: London Road Stadium; Attendance: 55; Referee: Andrew Miller
Note: Match was initially scheduled for 25 November 2022, but was postponed due to poor weather.

19 December 2022	Peterborough United	0–2	Brentford	Peterborough
13:00		Report	Pressley 58'; Pruti 60'	Stadium: London Road Stadium; Attendance: 87; Referee: David Richardson

21 December 2022	Aston Villa	4–0	Blackburn Rovers	Bodymoor Heath
14:00	O'Reilly 6'; Frith 8'; Bogarde 53'; Kellyman 63'	Report		Stadium: Bodymoor Heath Training Ground; Attendance: 266; Referee: Greg Rollason
Note: Originally scheduled for 16 December, but was rescheduled due to forecast freezing weather.

13 January 2023	Brentford	3–2	Aston Villa	Woking
19:00	Trevitt 20'; Yarmolyuk 32'; Gilbert 78' (pen.)	Report	Lindley 74'; Bogarde 79'	Stadium: Kingfield Stadium; Attendance: 525; Referee: Stephen Parkinson
Note: Originally scheduled for 12 December 2022, but was postponed due to a frozen pitch.

3 February 2023	Blackburn Rovers	1–2	Peterborough United	Leyland
16:00	Biniek 73' (pen.)	Report	Gyamfi 48' (pen.); Marshall 60'	Stadium: County Ground; Attendance: 89; Referee: Andrew Miller
Note: Originally scheduled for 10 December 2022, but was postponed due to a frozen pitch.

=== Group E ===
Team	Pld	W	D	L	GF	GA	GD	Pts
Bristol City	6	3	2	1	17	8	+9	11
Sheffield United	6	3	1	2	8	9	−1	10
Crystal Palace	6	2	2	2	10	12	−2	8
Newcastle United	6	1	1	4	5	11	−6	4

Updated to match(es) played on 25 January 2023. Source:

14 November 2022	Bristol City	4–0	Newcastle United	Failand
13:00	Low 12'; Bell 16', 33', 51'	Report		Stadium: Robins High Performance Centre; Attendance: 120; Referee: Jacob Miles

14 November 2022	Sheffield United	1–2	Crystal Palace	Sheffield
19:00	Hampson 75'	Report	Ola-Adebomi 43'; Gordon 76'	Stadium: Bramall Lane; Attendance: 280; Referee: Lewis Smith

21 November 2022	Sheffield United	2–1	Bristol City	Sheffield
14:00	Marsh 30'; Barratt 51'	Report	Bell 85'	Stadium: Bramall Lane; Attendance: 68; Referee: David Richardson

21 November 2022	Newcastle United	0–1	Crystal Palace	Newcastle-upon-Tyne
19:00		Report	Gordon 53'	Stadium: Northumberland FA HQ; Attendance: 124; Referee: Mathew Dicicco

28 November 2022	Bristol City	2–2	Crystal Palace	Failand
13:00	Palmer-Houlden 45'; Low 58'	Report	Phillips 39'; Omilabu 45+1'	Stadium: Robins High Performance Centre; Attendance: 110; Referee: Adrian Quelch

28 November 2022	Sheffield United	2–1	Newcastle United	Scunthorpe
15:00	Maguire 29'; Hampson 71'	Report	Miley 45+7'	Stadium: Glanford Park; Attendance: 48; Referee: Matthew Corlett

5 December 2022	Crystal Palace	2–5	Bristol City	East Dulwich
14:00	Omilabu 34' (pen.); Phillips 55'	Report	Pearson 15', 72'; Palmer-Houlden 28'; Taylor 56'; Bell 82'	Stadium: Champion Hill; Attendance: 114; Referee: Paul Johnson

5 December 2022	Newcastle United	0–1	Sheffield United	Newcastle-upon-Tyne
19:00		Report	Gaxha 37'	Stadium: Northumberland FA HQ; Attendance: 99; Referee: Gareth Rhodes

19 December 2022	Bristol City	4–1	Sheffield United	Failand
13:00	Palmer-Houlden 10'; Bell 39', 59'; Kadji 81'	Report	Jebbison 72'	Stadium: Robins High Performance Centre; Attendance: 75; Referee: Greg Rollason

19 December 2022	Crystal Palace	2–3	Newcastle United	East Dulwich
13:00	Phillips 52', 76'	Report	Miley 45', 90+1', 90+3'	Stadium: Champion Hill; Attendance: 144; Referee: Aji Ajibola

13 January 2023	Crystal Palace	1–1	Sheffield United	East Dulwich
13:00	Omilabu 90+4'	Report	Hackford 54'	Stadium: Champion Hill; Attendance: 144; Referee: Jacob Miles
Note: Originally scheduled for 9 December 2022, but was postponed due to a frozen pitch.

25 January 2023	Newcastle United	1–1	Bristol City	Newcastle-upon-Tyne
13:00	Diallo 90+3'	Report	Palmer-Houlden 74' (pen.)	Stadium: Northumberland FA HQ; Attendance: 56; Referee: Aaron Jackson
Note: Originally scheduled for 12 December 2022, but was postponed due to a frozen pitch.

=== Group F ===
Team	Pld	W	D	L	GF	GA	GD	Pts
Southampton	6	4	1	1	22	7	+15	13
Everton	6	2	2	2	13	9	+4	8
Birmingham City	6	2	2	2	8	11	−3	8
Colchester United	6	1	1	4	8	24	−16	4

Updated to match(es) played on 20 January 2023. Source:

14 October 2022	Colchester United	2–1	Birmingham City	Colchester
19:00	Uwandu 78'; Redgrave 85'	Report	Wakefield 29'	Stadium: Colchester Community Stadium; Attendance: 213; Referee: Wayne Cartmel

13 November 2022	Everton	1–2	Southampton	Liverpool
12:00	Price 24'	Report 1 Report 2	Morgan 52', 63'	Stadium: Walton Hall Park; Attendance: 202; Referee: Elliot Swallow

21 November 2022	Southampton	4–0	Birmingham City	Marchwood
19:00	Morgan 19', 43', 73'; Doyle 53'	Report		Stadium: Staplewood; Attendance: 94; Referee: Adrian Quelch

25 November 2022	Everton	1–1	Birmingham City	Southport
19:00	Okoronkwo 44'	Report	Williams 79'	Stadium: Haig Avenue; Attendance: 45; Referee: Andrew Miller

26 November 2022	Colchester United	0–5	Southampton	Colchester
13:00		Report	Otseh-Taiwo 50'; Morgan 66', 75'; Pearce 70'; Amo-Ameyaw 81'	Stadium: Colchester Community Stadium; Attendance: 165; Referee: Alan Dale

2 December 2022	Southampton	7–1	Colchester United	Southampton
19:00	Bellis 33', 43' (pen.), 45'; Merry 39', 79'; Pearce 48'; Robinson 62'	Report	Ihionvien 25'	Stadium: St Mary's Stadium; Attendance: 238; Referee: Wayne Cartmel

3 December 2022	Birmingham City	1–0	Everton	Nuneaton
12:00	Sanusi 90+3'	Report		Stadium: Liberty Way; Attendance: 65; Referee: Greg Rollason

6 December 2022	Everton	7–2	Colchester United	Southport
19:00	Cannon 1', 84'; Kouyate 18', 45+3', 75'; Hunt 28'; Price 87'	Report 1 Report 2	Redgrave 83'; Drakes-Thomas 90+3'	Stadium: Haig Avenue; Attendance: 81; Referee: Paul Madsen

16 December 2022	Birmingham City	2–2	Southampton	Kings Norton
19:00	Williams 70'; Patterson 90+2'	Report	Ballard 34' (pen.); Armitage 81'	Stadium: Wast Hill Training Ground; Attendance: 100; Referee: Jason Richardson
Note: Moved from Liberty Way into Birmingham City's training ground at late notice, due to a frozen pitch in Nuneaton.

20 December 2022	Colchester United	1–1	Everton	Maldon, Essex
19:00	Ihionvien 87'	Report 1 Report 2	Kouyaté 17'	Stadium: Wallace Binder Stadium; Attendance: 89; Referee: Lloyd Wood

18 January 2023	Southampton	2–3	Everton	Marchwood
12:00	Pearce 21'; Pambou 24'	Report 1 Report 2	Samuels-Smith 17'; Kouyate 45+3'; Okoronkwo 53'	Stadium: Staplewood; Attendance: 34; Referee: James Durkin
Note: Originally scheduled for 10 December 2022, but was postponed due to a frozen pitch.

20 January 2023	Birmingham City	3–2	Colchester United	Kings Norton
14:00	Thorndike 5', 64'; Simmonds 11'	Report	Ihionvien 1'; Home 73' (o.g.)	Stadium: Wast Hill Training Ground; Attendance: 100; Referee: Paul Johnson

=== Group G ===
Team	Pld	W	D	L	GF	GA	GD	Pts
Arsenal	6	3	2	1	14	9	+5	11
Stoke City	6	2	3	1	11	7	+4	9
Burnley	6	2	2	2	13	15	−2	8
Swansea City	6	1	1	4	10	17	−7	4

Updated to match(es) played on 31 January 2023. Source:

17 August 2022	Arsenal	2–1	Swansea City	Borehamwood
19:00	Ideho 17'; Cédric 34'	Report	Thomas 12'	Stadium: Meadow Park; Attendance: 380; Referee: Matthew Russell

23 September 2022	Burnley	1–3	Arsenal	Leyland
13:00	Mellon 55'	Report	Ideho 7', 60'; Bandeira 17'	Stadium: County Ground; Attendance: 87; Referee: Aaron Jackson

27 October 2022	Stoke City	1–1	Burnley	Nantwich
19:00	Lowe 90+4'	Report	Costelloe 50' (pen.)	Stadium: The Weaver Stadium; Attendance: 247; Referee: Scott Jackson

19 November 2022	Arsenal	1–1	Stoke City	Borehamwood
13:00	Edwards 19' (pen.)	Report	Tezgel 32'	Stadium: Meadow Park; Attendance: 208; Referee: Alan Dale

21 November 2022	Swansea City	5–2	Burnley	Landore
14:00	Lloyd 52', 69'; McFayden 57'; Congreve 73'; Thomas 90+2'	Report	Mellon 23', 42'	Stadium: Landore Training Centre; Attendance: 120; Referee: Elliot Swallow

26 November 2022	Swansea City	1–4	Arsenal	Landore
14:00	Hurford 88'	Report	Cîrjan 8', 45+5'; Butler-Oyedeji 40'; Sagoe Jr. 45+2'	Stadium: Landore Training Centre; Attendance: 180; Referee: James Durkin

28 November 2022	Burnley	3–1	Stoke City	Leyland
19:00	Mellon 22'; McGlynn 49'; Westley 90'	Report	Kerhsaw 75'	Stadium: County Ground; Attendance: 107; Referee: Aaron Bannister

2 December 2022	Swansea City	0–4	Stoke City	Landore
14:00		Report	Lowe 21', 45', 81', 86'	Stadium: Landore Training Centre; Attendance: 80; Referee: Aaron Jackson

9 December 2022	Stoke City	2–0	Swansea City	Burton upon Trent
19:00	Lowe 15'; Ludvigsen 34' (o.g.)	Report		Stadium: St George's Park National Football Centre; Attendance: 57; Referee: Scott Tallis

18 December 2022	Stoke City	2–2	Arsenal	Burton upon Trent
12:00	Kershaw 40'; Tezgel 89'	Report	Cottrell 76'; Roney 81' (o.g.)	Stadium: St George's Park National Football Centre; Attendance: 211; Referee: Steve Copeland

13 January 2023	Burnley	3–3	Swansea City	Leyland
13:00	Mellon 21', 25', 78'	Report	Trialist 29'; Whittaker 34'; Morgan 54'	Stadium: County Ground; Attendance: 103; Referee: Matthew Dicicco
Note: Originally scheduled for 20 December 2022, but was postponed due to a pitch which was both frozen and waterlogged.

31 January 2023	Arsenal	2–3	Burnley	Borehamwood
19:00	Robinson 9'; Cîrjan 37'	Report	Westley 3'; Lewis 45'; Grant 51'	Stadium: Meadow Park; Attendance: 238; Referee: Lloyd Wood
Note: Originally scheduled for 9 December 2022, but postponed due to a frozen pitch.

=== Group H ===
Team	Pld	W	D	L	GF	GA	GD	Pts
Wolverhampton Wanderers	6	5	0	1	9	5	+4	15
Reading	6	3	0	3	9	6	+3	9
Cardiff City	6	3	0	3	5	3	+2	9
Sunderland	6	1	0	5	4	13	−9	3

Updated to match(es) played on 20 January 2023. Source:

26 August 2022	Reading	1–0	Cardiff City	Reading
14:00	Osorio 24'	Report		Stadium: Madejski Stadium; Attendance: 203; Referee: Benjamin Wyatt

14 October 2022	Sunderland	1–3	Reading	Hetton-le-Hole
19:00	Crompton 41'	Report	Ehibhatiomham 19', 33', 74'	Stadium: Eppleton Colliery Welfare Ground; Attendance: 249; Referee: Matthew Dicicco

11 November 2022	Wolverhampton Wanderers	2–1	Reading	Kidderminster
14:00	Farmer 28'; Harkin 71'	Report	Okine-Peters 90+4'	Stadium: Aggborough; Attendance: 127; Referee: Aaron Jackson

14 November 2022	Wolverhampton Wanderers	1–0	Sunderland	Wellington
14:00	Scicluna 58'	Report		Stadium: New Bucks Head; Attendance: 147; Referee: Matthew Corlett

21 November 2022	Sunderland	0–2	Cardiff City	Hetton-le-Hole
19:00		Report	Hughes 20', 69'	Stadium: Eppleton Colliery Welfare Ground; Attendance: 151; Referee: Michael Barlow

25 November 2022	Cardiff City	1–0	Reading	Leckwith
14:00	Wigley 76'	Report		Stadium: Cardiff International Sports Stadium; Attendance: 100; Referee: Paul Johnson

3 December 2022	Cardiff City	0–1	Wolverhampton Wanderers	Leckwith
15:00		Report	Harper 17'	Stadium: Cardiff International Sports Stadium; Attendance: 200; Referee: Gary Parsons

12 December 2022	Reading	1–2	Sunderland	Reading
14:00	Ehibhatiomhan 68'	Report	Scott 24'; Sohna 56'	Stadium: Madejski Stadium; Attendance: 138; Referee: Jacob Miles

19 December 2022	Reading	3–0	Wolverhampton Wanderers	Reading
14:00	Ehibhatiomhan 42'; Azeez 53'; Leavy 90+1'	Report		Stadium: Madejski Stadium; Attendance: 127; Referee: Adrian Quelch

21 December 2022	Cardiff City	2–0	Sunderland	Leckwith
11:00	Colwill 33'; Crompton 69' (o.g.)	Report		Stadium: Cardiff International Sports Stadium; Attendance: 100; Referee: Elliot Swallow
Note: Originally scheduled for 16 December 2022, but was postponed due to a frozen pitch.

5 January 2023	Sunderland	1–4	Wolverhampton Wanderers	Hetton-le-Hole
13:00	Spellman 67'	Report	Griffiths 8'; Hesketh 21', 28', 42' (pen.)	Stadium: Eppleton Colliery Welfare Ground; Attendance: 137; Referee: Edward Duckworth
Note: Match abandoned after 10 minutes on 28 November 2022, due to fog.

20 January 2023	Wolverhampton Wanderers	1–0	Cardiff City	Wellington
14:00	Benjamin 59' (o.g.)	Report		Stadium: New Bucks Head; Attendance: 187; Referee: Daniel Middleton
Note: Originally scheduled for 10 December 2022, but was postponed due to a frozen pitch.

== Knockout stages ==
=== Round of 16 ===
The Round of 16 included all 8 group winners and runners up. The draw was made on 25 January 2023.

30 January 2023	Brentford	2–1	Middlesbrough	Stevenage
14:00 GMT	Bennett 25'; Gilbert 45+1'	Report	Finch 74'	Stadium: Broadhall Way; Attendance: 70; Referee: Jason Richardson
Note: Match was originally going to be played at Woking's Kingfield Stadium, but because of a rearranged fixture, the day after Brentford Played, the match was moved to Stevenage's Broadhall Way at 2pm (14:00 Greenwich Mean Time).

3 February 2023	Southampton	1–0	Sheffield United	Totton
13:00 GMT	Ballard 5' (pen.)	Report		Stadium: Snows Stadium; Attendance: 125; Referee: Ruebyn Ricardo

3 February 2023	Arsenal	2–1 (a.e.t.)	Reading	Borehamwood
19:00 GMT	Cîrjan 32'; Bandeira 96'	Report	Carson 52'	Stadium: Meadow Park; Attendance: 305; Referee: Matthew Russell

5 February 2023	Bristol City	2–1	Everton	Failand
13:00 GMT	Palmer-Houlden 2' (pen.); Pearson 9'	Report	Okoronkwo 47'	Stadium: Robins High Performance Centre; Attendance: 280; Referee: Robert Massey-Ellis

6 February 2023	Wolverhampton Wanderers	2–3	Stoke City	Kidderminster
19:00 GMT	Barnett 30'; Scicluna 42'	Report	Lowe 19'; Tezgel 29', 76'	Stadium: Aggborough; Attendance: 172; Referee: Jacob Miles

7 February 2023	Huddersfield Town	1–4	Blackburn Rovers	Huddersfield
19:00 GMT	Jones 81'	Report	Morton 32'; Gallagher 44'; Leonard 46', 52'	Stadium: John Smith's Stadium; Attendance: 208; Referee: Matthew Corlett

20 February 2023	Fulham	5–0	Queens Park Rangers	New Malden
19:00 GMT	Ablade 25'; Harris 44' (pen.), 48'; Godo 71'; Sanderson 90+4'	Report		Stadium: Motspur Park; Attendance: 163; Referee: Elliot Swallow

24 February 2023	Derby County	0–2	Nottingham Forest	Loughborough
19:00 GMT		Report	Larsson 62'; McAdam 90+2'	Stadium: Loughborough University Stadium; Attendance: 237; Referee: Jamie O'Connor
Note: Match postponed due to a frozen pitch. Match will be played on February 24, 2023.

=== Quarter-finals ===
The Quarter finals included the 8 winners from the previous round. The draw for the quarter finals was made on 27 February 2023.

10 March 2023	Southampton	1–4	Blackburn Rovers	Marchwood
19:00 GMT	Mola 30' (o.g.)	Report	Edmondson 21'; O'Grady-Macken 25'; Walker 45+1'; Gilsenan 48'	Stadium: Staplewood; Attendance: 81; Referee: Matthew Russell

11 March 2023	Stoke City	1–6	Fulham	Stoke-on-Trent
13:00 GMT	Holland-Wilkinson 52'	Report	Ablade 14', 45+3', 64'; Hilton 60', 67'; Sanderson 86'	Stadium: Bet365 Stadium; Attendance: 135; Referee: Sam Mulhall

13 March 2023	Bristol City	0–0 (a.e.t.) (5–6 p)	Nottingham Forest	Failand
13:00 GMT		Report		Stadium: Robins High Performance Centre; Attendance: 105; Referee: Jason Richardson
	Penalties
	Palmer-Houlden (penalty scored); Acey (penalty scored); Leeson (penalty missed); Bell (penalty scored); Thomas (penalty scored); Yeboah (penalty scored); Clark (penalty missed)		(penalty scored) Powell; (penalty scored) McDonnell; (penalty scored) Esapa Osong; (penalty scored) McAdam; (penalty missed) Collins; (penalty scored) Larsson; (penalty scored) Hammond

13 March 2023	Brentford	1–0	Arsenal	Sutton
19:00 GMT	Gilbert 90+1' (pen.)	Report		Stadium: Gander Green Lane; Attendance: 516; Referee: Gary Parsons

=== Semi-finals ===
The Semi-Finals includes the four winners from the Previous Round. The Draw was made on 28 March 2023.

11 April 2023	Blackburn Rovers	6–1	Nottingham Forest	Blackburn
19:00 BST	Edun 11'; Wharton 32'; O'Grady-Macken 43'; Brittain 75'; Weston 87', 90+3'	Report	Gibson-Hammond 56'	Stadium: Ewood Park; Attendance: 602; Referee: Daniel Middleton

27 April 2023	Fulham	1–2	Brentford	New Malden
19:00 BST	Harris 90+3'	Report	Gilbert 25'; Crama 49'	Stadium: Motspur Park; Attendance: 556; Referee: James Durkin

=== Final ===
The Final took place on 9 May 2023 at Brentford.

9 May 2023
19:45 BST

Brentford	2–1	Blackburn Rovers
Trevitt 32'; Young-Coombes 42'	Report	Gilsenan 87'

Brentford Community Stadium, Brentford
Attendance: 2,219
Referee: Daniel Middleton

Note: Flags indicate national team as defined under FIFA eligibility rules; some limited exceptions apply. Players may hold more than one non-FIFA nationality.

Brentford
No.	Pos.	Nation	Player
1	GK	ENG	Matthew Cox
2	DF	WAL	Fin Stevens
3	MF	IRL	Val Adedokun
4	DF	ENG	Daniel Oyegoke
5	DF	FRA	Tristan Crama
6	MF	NOR	Kristoffer Ajer
7	FW	ENG	Michael Olakigbe
8	MF	ENG	Ryan Trevitt
9	FW	ENG	Nathan Young-Coombes (substituted off) 79'
10	FW	IRL	Alex Gilbert
22	MF	ALB	Roy Syla
Substitutes:
12	MF	ENG	Angel Waruih
14	DF	ENG	Charlie Farr
15	FW	ENG	Max Dickov (substituted on) 79'
19	FW	ENG	Romeo Beckham
25	FW	ENG	Tony Yogane
Coach: (Scotland) Neil MacFarlane

Blackburn Rovers
No.	Pos.	Nation	Player
1	GK	ENG	Jordan Eastham
2	DF	USA	Leo Duru (substituted off) 45'
3	MF	ENG	Jake Batty (substituted off) 83'
4	DF	ENG	Patrick Gamble
5	DF	ENG	Ashley Phillips
6	DF	ENG	Georgie Gent
7	MF	ENG	Jake Garrett
8	MF	SCO	Kristi Montgomery
9	FW	ENG	Harry Leonard
10	FW	ENG	Harley O'Grady-Macken (substituted off) 74'
11	FW	ENG	Sam Burns (substituted off) 74'
Substitutes:
12	MF	ENG	James Edmondson (substituted on) 74'
13	GK	ENG	Felix Goddard
14	MF	IRL	Zak Gilsenan (substituted on) 45'
15	DF	ENG	George Pratt (substituted on) 83'
16	MF	ENG	Charlie Weston (substituted on) 74'
Coach: (England) Mike Sheron

== See also ==
- 2022–23 Professional U21 Development League
- 2022–23 FA Youth Cup
