= 2022–23 Brentford F.C. season =

English football team season

Brentford
2022–23 season
- Owner: Matthew Benham
- Head coach: Thomas Frank
- Stadium: Brentford Community Stadium
- Premier League: 9th
- FA Cup: Third round
- EFL Cup: Third round
- Top goalscorer: League: Ivan Toney (20); All: Ivan Toney (21)
- Highest home attendance: 17,163 vs Liverpool (2 January 2023, Premier League)
- Lowest home attendance: 16,278 vs Gillingham (8 November 2022, EFL Cup)
- Average home league attendance: 17,064
- Biggest win: 4–0 vs Manchester United, Premier League, 13 August 2022
- Biggest defeat: 1–5 vs Newcastle United, Premier League, 8 October 2022; 0–4 vs Aston Villa, Premier League, 23 October 2022
Home colours	Away colours	Third colours

The 2022–23 season was the 133rd season in the existence of Brentford Football Club and its second consecutive season in the Premier League. In addition to the Premier League, the club also competed in the FA Cup and the EFL Cup.

Brentford enjoyed one of the best seasons in their history, including a 12-match unbeaten run between October and March, finishing the season in 9th place, narrowly missing out on a European spot. In addition, they were the only side to defeat league and European champions Manchester City at their home ground, and the only side to defeat them twice.

== First team squad ==
Players' ages are as of the opening day of the 2022–23 season.

No.	Player	Nationality	Position	Date of birth (age)	Signed from	Signed in	Notes
Goalkeepers
1	David Raya	(Spain)	GK	15 September 1995 (aged 26)	Blackburn Rovers	2019	
22	Thomas Strakosha	(Albania)	GK	19 March 1995 (aged 27)	Lazio	2022	
34	Matthew Cox	(England)	GK	2 May 2003 (aged 19)	AFC Wimbledon	2021	
—	Ellery Balcombe	(England)	GK	15 October 1999 (aged 22)	Academy	2016	Loaned to Crawley Town and Bristol Rovers
Defenders
2	Aaron Hickey	(Scotland)	RB	10 June 2002 (aged 20)	Bologna	2022	
3	Rico Henry	(Jamaica)	LB	8 July 1997 (aged 25)	Walsall	2016	
4	Charlie Goode	(England)	CB	3 August 1995 (aged 27)	Northampton Town	2020	Loaned to Blackpool
5	Ethan Pinnock	(Jamaica)	CB	29 May 1993 (aged 29)	Barnsley	2019	
13	Mathias Jørgensen	(Denmark)	CB	23 April 1990 (aged 32)	Fenerbahçe	2021	
16	Ben Mee	(England)	CB	21 September 1989 (aged 32)	Burnley	2022	
18	Pontus Jansson (c)	(Sweden)	CB	13 February 1991 (aged 31)	Leeds United	2019	
20	Kristoffer Ajer	(Norway)	CB / RB	17 April 1998 (aged 24)	Celtic	2021	
29	Mads Bech Sørensen	(Denmark)	CB	7 January 1999 (aged 23)	AC Horsens	2017	Loaned to Nice and Groningen
30	Mads Roerslev	(Denmark)	RB	24 June 1999 (aged 23)	Copenhagen	2019	
32	Tristan Crama	(France)	CB	8 November 2001 (aged 20)	Béziers	2020	
33	Fin Stevens	(Wales)	RB	10 April 2003 (aged 19)	Worthing	2020	Loaned to Swansea City
Midfielders
6	Christian Nørgaard	(Denmark)	DM	10 March 1994 (aged 28)	Fiorentina	2019	
8	Mathias Jensen	(Denmark)	CM	1 January 1996 (aged 26)	Celta Vigo	2019	
10	Josh Dasilva	(England)	AM	23 October 1998 (aged 23)	Arsenal	2018	
14	Saman Ghoddos	(Iran)	AM	6 September 1993 (aged 28)	Amiens	2021	
15	Frank Onyeka	(Nigeria)	DM	1 January 1998 (aged 24)	Midtjylland	2021	
24	Mikkel Damsgaard	(Denmark)	AM	3 July 2000 (aged 22)	Sampdoria	2022	
25	Myles Peart-Harris	(England)	AM	18 September 2002 (aged 19)	Chelsea	2021	Loaned to Forest Green Rovers
26	Shandon Baptiste	(Grenada)	CM	8 April 1998 (aged 24)	Oxford United	2020	
27	Vitaly Janelt	(Germany)	DM	10 May 1998 (aged 24)	VfL Bochum	2020	
28	Mads Bidstrup	(Denmark)	MF	25 February 2001 (aged 21)	RB Leipzig	2020	Loaned to Nordsjælland
35	Ryan Trevitt	(England)	MF	12 March 2003 (aged 19)	Leatherhead Youth	2021	
36	Yehor Yarmolyuk	(Ukraine)	CM	1 March 2004 (aged 18)	Dnipro-1	2022	
37	Alex Gilbert	(Republic of Ireland)	AM	28 December 2001 (aged 20)	West Bromwich Albion	2020	
―	Paris Maghoma	(England)	CM	8 May 2001 (aged 21)	Tottenham Hotspur	2020	Loaned to AFC Wimbledon and Milton Keynes Dons
Attackers
7	Sergi Canós	(Spain)	W / RWB	2 February 1997 (aged 25)	Norwich City	2017	Loaned to Olympiacos
9	Kevin Schade	(Germany)	LW / FW	27 November 2001 (aged 20)	SC Freiburg	2023	On loan from SC Freiburg
11	Yoane Wissa	(Democratic Republic of the Congo)	W / FW	3 September 1996 (aged 25)	Lorient	2021	
17	Ivan Toney	(England)	FW	16 March 1996 (aged 26)	Peterborough United	2020	
19	Bryan Mbeumo	(Cameroon)	W / FW	7 August 1999 (aged 23)	Troyes	2019	
21	Halil Dervişoğlu	(Turkey)	FW	8 December 1999 (aged 22)	Sparta Rotterdam	2020	Loaned to Burnley
23	Keane Lewis-Potter	(England)	LW	22 February 2001 (aged 21)	Hull City	2022	
38	Michael Olakigbe	(England)	LW	6 April 2004 (aged 18)	Fulham	2022	
―	Tariqe Fosu	(Ghana)	LW	5 November 1995 (aged 26)	Oxford United	2020	Loaned to Stoke City and Rotherham United
―	Joel Valencia	(Ecuador)	W	16 November 1994 (aged 27)	Piast Gliwice	2019	Loaned to De Graafschap
Players who left the club mid-season
―	Luka Racic	(Denmark)	CB	8 May 1999 (aged 23)	Copenhagen	2018	Transferred to Sønderjyske

== Transfers ==
=== Transfers in ===
Date	Position	Nationality	Player	From	Fee	Ref.
1 July 2022 (Note: Dickov's transfer was announced on 29 June 2022 and his contract commenced on 1 July 2022.)	FB	(England)	Max Dickov	(England) Stockport Town	Free transfer	
1 July 2022 (Note: Wilcox's transfer was announced on 29 June 2022 and his contract commenced on 1 July 2022.)	MF	(England)	Max Wilcox	(England) Bolton Wanderers	Undisclosed	
9 July 2022	RB	(Scotland)	Aaron Hickey	(Italy) Bologna	£17,000,000	
12 July 2022	LW	(England)	Keane Lewis-Potter	(England) Hull City	£16,000,000	
13 July 2022	W	(England)	Kyreece Lisbie	(England) Watford	Free transfer	
14 July 2022	GK	(Albania)	Thomas Strakosha	(Italy) Lazio	Free transfer	
14 July 2022	CM	(Ukraine)	Yehor Yarmolyuk	(Ukraine) Dnipro-1	Undisclosed	
22 July 2022	CB	(England)	Ben Mee	(England) Burnley	Free transfer	
29 July 2022	LW	(England)	Michael Olakigbe	(England) Fulham	Undisclosed	
4 August 2022	FW	(England)	Lucias Vine	(England) Aldershot Town	Free transfer	
10 August 2022	RW	(England)	Isaac Holland	(England) Sheffield Wednesday	Compensation	
10 August 2022	LW	(England)	Tony Yogane	(England) Sheffield Wednesday	Compensation	
10 August 2022	AM	(Denmark)	Mikkel Damsgaard	(Italy) Sampdoria	£16,700,000	
24 August 2022	CM	(England)	Angel Waruih	(England) Plymouth Argyle	Free transfer	
31 August 2022	CB	(Albania)	Edon Pruti	(England) Slough Town	Undisclosed	
1 September 2022	FB	(England)	Charlie Farr	Free agent	Free transfer	
20 October 2022	DM	(Albania)	Roy Syla	Free agent	Free transfer	
25 October 2022	FB	(England)	Byron Wilson	Free agent	Free transfer	
30 November 2022	W	(England)	J'Neil Bennett	Free agent	Free transfer	
1 January 2023 (Note: McManus' transfer was announced on 15 December 2022 and his contract commenced on 1 January 2023.)	LB	(Republic of Ireland)	Conor McManus	(Republic of Ireland) Bray Wanderers	Undisclosed	
4 January 2023	MF	(England)	Beaux Booth	(England) Dorking Wanderers	Undisclosed	
30 January 2023	GK	(Scotland)	Vincent Angelini	(England) Watford	Undisclosed	

=== Loans in ===
Date	Position	Nationality	Player	From	Date until	Ref.
4 January 2023	LW	(Germany)	Kevin Schade	(Germany) SC Freiburg	End of season (Note: Under the terms of Schade's loan, Brentford paid a €1,000,000 fee.)	
6 January 2023	FB	(England)	Romeo Beckham	(United States) Inter Miami II	End of season	

=== Loans out ===
Date	Position	Nationality	Player	To	Date until	Ref.
5 July 2022	CM	(Denmark)	Mads Bidstrup	(Denmark) Nordsjælland	End of season	
18 July 2022	CM	(England)	Paris Maghoma	(England) AFC Wimbledon	5 January 2023 (Note: Maghoma was recalled from his season-long loan at AFC Wimbledon on 5 January 2023.)	
22 July 2022	W	(Australia)	Lachlan Brook	(England) Crewe Alexandra	End of season (Note: Brook's half-season loan at Crewe Alexandra was extended until the end of the season on 4 January 2023.)	
27 July 2022	RB	(England)	Daniel Oyegoke	(England) Milton Keynes Dons	2 January 2023 (Note: Oyegoke was recalled from his season-long loan at Milton Keynes Dons on 2 January 2023.)	
29 July 2022	RW	(England)	Nathan Young-Coombes	(England) AFC Wimbledon	20 January 2023 (Note: Young-Coombes was recalled from his season-long loan at AFC Wimbledon on 20 January 2023.)	
30 July 2022	GK	(England)	Ellery Balcombe	(England) Crawley Town	17 January 2023 (Note: Balcombe was recalled from his season-long loan at Crawley Town on 17 January 2023.)	
16 August 2022	LW	(Ghana)	Tariqe Fosu	(England) Stoke City	20 January 2023 (Note: Fosu was recalled from his season-long loan at Stoke City on 20 January 2023.)	
22 August 2022	AM	(England)	Myles Peart-Harris	(England) Forest Green Rovers	End of season (Note: Peart-Harris' half-season loan at Forest Green Rovers was extended until the end of the season on 3 January 2023.)	
31 August 2022	W	(Ecuador)	Joel Valencia	(Netherlands) De Graafschap	End of season	
1 September 2022	FW	(Turkey)	Halil Dervişoğlu	(England) Burnley	End of season	
1 September 2022	CB	(Denmark)	Mads Bech Sørensen	(France) Nice	1 January 2023 (Note: Sørensen was recalled from his season-long loan at Nice on 1 January 2023.)	
1 September 2022	RB	(Wales)	Fin Stevens	(Wales) Swansea City	1 January 2023 (Note: Stevens was recalled from his season-long loan at Swansea City on 1 January 2023.)	
4 January 2023	FW	(Scotland)	Aaron Pressley	(England) Accrington Stanley	End of season	
18 January 2023	CB	(Denmark)	Mads Bech Sørensen	(Netherlands) Groningen	End of season	
19 January 2023	GK	(England)	Ellery Balcombe	(England) Bristol Rovers	End of season	
20 January 2023	LW	(Ghana)	Tariqe Fosu	(England) Rotherham United	End of season	
23 January 2023	CM	(England)	Paris Maghoma	(England) Milton Keynes Dons	End of season	
23 January 2023	CB	(England)	Charlie Goode	(England) Blackpool	End of season	
31 January 2023	RW	(Spain)	Sergi Canós	(Greece) Olympiacos	End of season	

=== Transfers out ===
Date	Position	Nationality	Name	To	Fee	Ref.
10 June 2022 (Note: Hockenhull's transfer was announced on 27 May 2022 and took place on 10 June 2022, the opening day of the summer transfer window.)	CB	(England)	Ben Hockenhull	(England) Tranmere Rovers	Free transfer	
22 June 2022 (Note: Jefferies' transfer was announced on 16 June 2022 and took place on 22 June 2022.)	CM	(Wales)	Dom Jefferies	(England) Gillingham	Free transfer	
30 June 2022	AM	(Denmark)	Christian Eriksen	(England) Manchester United	Released	
30 June 2022	LB	(Scotland)	Lewis Gordon	(England) Bristol Rovers	Released	
30 June 2022	W	(England)	Max Haygarth	(Northern Ireland) Linfield	Released	
30 June 2022	RW	(England)	Wraynel Hercules	(England) Enfield Town	Released	
30 June 2022	CB	(Guinea)	Julian Jeanvier	(France) Auxerre	Released	
30 June 2022	FW	(Denmark)	Gustav Mogensen	(Norway) Sarpsborg 08	Released	
30 June 2022	FW	(Netherlands)	Hans Mpongo	(Iceland) Þróttur V.	Released	
30 June 2022	CM	(Finland)	Jaakko Oksanen	(Finland) KuPS	Released	
30 June 2022	CB	(England)	Jude Russell	(England) Beckenham Town	Released	
30 June 2022	DM	(Albania)	Roy Syla	Free agent	Released	
25 July 2022	LB	(England)	Dominic Thompson	(England) Blackpool	Undisclosed	
28 July 2022	FW	(Finland)	Marcus Forss	(England) Middlesbrough	Undisclosed	
1 September 2022	CB	(Denmark)	Luka Racic	(Denmark) Sønderjyske	Undisclosed	
13 January 2023	CB	(Albania)	Edon Pruti	(England) Hartlepool United	Undisclosed	

== Pre-season and friendlies ==
Win Draw Loss Fixtures

9 July 2022 Friendly	Boreham Wood	0–2	Brentford	Borehamwood
15:00 BST		Report	Mbeumo 9' (pen.); Dasilva 87'	Stadium: Meadow Park; Attendance: 1,170; Referee: Will Finnie

16 July 2022 Friendly	VfB Stuttgart	2–1	Brentford	Friedrichshafen
15:30 CEST	Kastanaras 72'; Coulibaly 90' (pen.)	Report	Mbeumo 11'	Stadium: Zeppelinstadion; Attendance: 3,600; Referee: Robert Hartmann

19 July 2022 Friendly	Strasbourg	2–2	Brentford	Donaueschingen
13:30 CEST	Ajorque 9', 61'	Report	Wissa 36'; Lewis-Potter 86'	Stadium: Obere Wiesen

23 July 2022 Friendly	VfL Wolfsburg	4–0	Brentford	Wolfsburg
16:00 CEST	Wimmer 27'; Bornauw 56'; Wind 66'; Kamiński 86'	Report		Stadium: AOK Stadion; Attendance: 3,512; Referee: Felix Bickel

26 July 2022 Friendly	Brighton & Hove Albion	0–1	Brentford	Falmer
15:00 BST		Report	Toney 80'	Stadium: Falmer Stadium; Attendance: 0 Referee: Tim Robinson

27 July 2022 Friendly	Arsenal	1–2	Brentford	London Colney
13:00 BST	Nketiah 24'	Report	Mbeumo 9'; Trevitt 45'	Stadium: Arsenal Training Centre; Attendance: 0

30 July 2022 Friendly	Brentford	1–0	Real Betis	Brentford
15:00 BST	Mbeumo 29'	Report		Stadium: Brentford Community Stadium; Referee: Chris Kavanagh

22 September 2022 Friendly	Brentford XI	1–1	Reading	Osterley
	Gilbert 62'	Report	Meite	Stadium: Jersey Road; Attendance: 0

10 December 2022 Friendly	Brentford	1–2	Bordeaux	Caldes de Montbui
13:30 CET	Gilbert 8'	Report	Davitashvili 18'; Maja (pen.)	Stadium: La Vinya; Attendance: 0

13 December 2022 Friendly	Brentford	1–3	Celta Vigo	Osterley
12:00 GMT	Wissa 1'	Report	Aspas 25', 47'; Larsen	Stadium: Jersey Road; Attendance: 0

17 December 2022 Friendly	Brentford	2–2	VfL Wolfsburg	Brentford
13:00 GMT	Mbeumo 21'; Toney 37'	Report	Waldschmidt 13'; Pejčinović 67'	Stadium: Brentford Community Stadium; Attendance: 0

20 December 2022 Friendly	Chelsea	5–1	Brentford	Stoke d'Abernon
	Havertz	Report		Stadium: Cobham Training Centre; Attendance: 0
Note: Match played over three 45-minute 'halves'.

18 January 2023 Friendly	Brentford XI	3–1	Leyton Orient	Osterley
	Lewis-Potter 43'; Schade 45', 60'	Report		Stadium: Jersey Road; Attendance: 0

== Competitions ==
=== Overall record ===
Competition	First match	Last match	Starting round	Final position	Record							
Competition	First match	Last match	Starting round	Final position	Pld	W	D	L	GF	GA	GD	Win %
Premier League	7 August 2022	28 May 2023	Matchday 1	9th	38	15	14	9	58	46	+12	39.47
FA Cup	7 January 2023		Third round	Third round	1	0	0	1	0	1	−1	0.00
EFL Cup	23 August 2022	8 November 2022	Second round	Third round	2	1	1	0	3	1	+2	50.00
Total					41	16	15	10	61	48	+13	39.02

Source: Soccerway

=== Premier League ===
==== League table ====
Pos	Team	Pld	W	D	L	GF	GA	GD	Pts	Qualification or relegation
7	Aston Villa	38	18	7	13	51	46	+5	61	Qualification to Europa Conference League play-off round (Note: Since the winners of the 2022–23 EFL Cup, Manchester United, qualified for the Champions League, the spot given to the League Cup winners (Europa Conference League play-off round) was passed to the seventh-placed team.)
8	Tottenham Hotspur	38	18	6	14	70	63	+7	60	
9	Brentford	38	15	14	9	58	46	+12	59	
10	Fulham	38	15	7	16	55	53	+2	52	
11	Crystal Palace	38	11	12	15	40	49	−9	45	

Source: Premier League
Rules for classification: 1) Points; 2) Goal difference; 3) Goals scored; 4) If the champions, relegated teams or qualified teams for UEFA competitions cannot be determined by rules 1 to 3, rules 4.1 to 4.3 are applied – 4.1) Points gained in head-to-head record between such teams; 4.2) Away goals scored in head-to-head record between such teams; 4.3) Play-offs

==== Results summary ====
Overall								Home						Away					
Pld	W	D	L	GF	GA	GD	Pts	W	D	L	GF	GA	GD	W	D	L	GF	GA	GD
38	15	14	9	58	46	+12	59	10	7	2	35	18	+17	5	7	7	23	28	−5

Source: Premier League

==== Results by round ====
Round	1	2	3	4	5	6	7	8	9	10	11	12	13	14	15	16	17	18	19	20	21	22	23	24	25	26	27	28	29	30	31	32	33	34	35	36	37	38
Ground	A	H	A	H	A	H	A	H	A	A	H	H	A	H	A	A	H	A	H	H	A	H	A	H	A	H	A	H	A	H	A	H	A	H	A	H	A	H
Result	D	W	L	D	D	W	W	L	D	L	W	D	L	D	D	W	D	W	W	W	D	W	D	D	L	W	L	D	D	L	L	D	W	W	L	W	W	W
Position	9	3	8	10	11	8	8	9	10	11	9	10	11	11	11	10	10	10	9	8	8	7	8	9	9	9	9	8	7	9	9	10	9	9	9	9	9	9

Source: Premier League
A = Away; H = Home; W = Win; D = Draw; L = Loss; P = Postponed

==== Matches ====
Win Draw Loss Fixtures

7 August 2022 1	Leicester City	2–2	Brentford	Leicester
14:00 BST	Castagne 33'; Dewsbury-Hall 46'	Report	Toney 62'; Dasilva 86'	Stadium: King Power Stadium; Attendance: 31,794; Referee: Jarred Gillett

13 August 2022 2	Brentford	4–0	Manchester United	Brentford
17:30 BST	Dasilva 10'; Jensen 18'; Mee 30'; Mbeumo 35'	Report	Maguire (yellow card) 16'; McTominay (yellow card) 82'; Rashford (yellow card) 89'; Fernandes (yellow card) 90+4'	Stadium: Brentford Community Stadium; Attendance: 17,051; Referee: Stuart Attwell

20 August 2022 3	Fulham	3–2	Brentford	Fulham
15:00 BST	Decordova-Reid 1'; Palhinha 20', (yellow card) 29'; Tete (yellow card) 31'; Mitrović 90'; Mbabu (yellow card) 90+4'	Report	Nørgaard 44'; Dasilva (yellow card) 56'; Toney 71'; Mee (yellow card) 80'	Stadium: Craven Cottage; Attendance: 21,798; Referee: Peter Bankes

27 August 2022 4	Brentford	1–1	Everton	Brentford
15:00 BST	Wissa (yellow card) 54'; Janelt 84'; Hickey (yellow card) 90+5'	Report	Gordon 24', (yellow card) 90+3'; Pickford (yellow card) 81'	Stadium: Brentford Community Stadium; Attendance: 17,009; Referee: John Brooks

30 August 2022 5	Crystal Palace	1–1	Brentford	Selhurst
19:30 BST	Zaha 59'; Doucouré (yellow card) 90+5'	Report	Hickey (yellow card) 71'; Toney (yellow card) 83'; Wissa 88'	Stadium: Selhurst Park; Attendance: 25,043; Referee: Simon Hooper

3 September 2022 6	Brentford	5–2	Leeds United	Brentford
15:00 BST	Toney 30' (pen.), 43', 58'; Mbeumo 80'; Wissa 90+1'; Damsgaard (yellow card) 90+5'; Hickey (yellow card) 90+7'	Report	Sinisterra (yellow card) 28', (goal) 45+1'; Roca 79'; Klich (yellow card) 90+7'	Stadium: Brentford Community Stadium; Attendance: 16,946; Referee: Robert Jones

18 September 2022 8	Brentford	0–3	Arsenal	Brentford
12:00 BST		Report	Saliba 17'; Gabriel Jesus 28', (yellow card) 90'; Vieira 49'; Xhaka (yellow card) 58'	Stadium: Brentford Community Stadium; Attendance: 17,122; Referee: David Coote

1 October 2022 9	Bournemouth	0–0	Brentford	King's Park
15:00 BST	Lerma (yellow card) 75'	Report	Toney (yellow card) 45+2'; Hickey (yellow card) 67'	Stadium: Dean Court; Attendance: 10,126; Referee: Thomas Bramall

8 October 2022 10	Newcastle United	5–1	Brentford	Newcastle upon Tyne
15:00 BST	Bruno Guimarães 21', 56'; Murphy 28'; Almirón 82'; Pinnock 90' (o.g.)	Report	Toney (yellow card) 45+1', (goal) 54' (pen.)	Stadium: St James' Park; Attendance: 52,067; Referee: John Brooks

14 October 2022 11	Brentford	2–0	Brighton & Hove Albion	Brentford
20:00 BST	Toney 27', 64' (pen.), (yellow card) 90+3'; Jensen (yellow card) 45+1'; Baptiste (yellow card) 90+2'	Report	Caicedo (yellow card) 45+2'	Stadium: Brentford Community Stadium; Attendance: 17,016; Referee: Michael Salisbury

19 October 2022 12	Brentford	0–0	Chelsea	Brentford
19:30 BST		Report		Stadium: Brentford Community Stadium; Attendance: 17,118; Referee: Jarred Gillett

23 October 2022 13	Aston Villa	4–0	Brentford	Aston, Birmingham
14:00 BST	Bailey 2'; Ings 7', 14' (pen.), (yellow card) 35'; Watkins 59'	Report		Stadium: Villa Park; Attendance: 41,693; Referee: Darren England

29 October 2022 14	Brentford	1–1	Wolverhampton Wanderers	Brentford
15:00 BST	Mee 50'; Mbeumo (yellow card) 80'; Damsgaard (yellow card) 86'; Toney (yellow card) 90+3'	Report	Semedo (yellow card) 1'; Podence (yellow card) 30'; Neves 52', (yellow card) 84'; Costa (red card) 90+7'	Stadium: Brentford Community Stadium; Attendance: 17,051; Referee: Bobby Madley

5 November 2022 15	Nottingham Forest	2–2	Brentford	West Bridgford
15:00 GMT	Gibbs-White 20'; Yates (yellow card) 34'; Henderson (yellow card) 45+1'; Jørgensen 90+6' (o.g.)	Report	Janelt (yellow card) 31'; Mbeumo 45+3' (pen.), (yellow card) 70'; Wissa 75'	Stadium: City Ground; Attendance: 28,869; Referee: Andre Marriner

12 November 2022 16	Manchester City	1–2	Brentford	Manchester
12:30 GMT	Haaland (yellow card) 37'; Foden 45+1'; Cancelo (yellow card) 84'	Report	Toney 16', 90+8'; Mbeumo (yellow card) 72'; Jensen (yellow card) 90+2'	Stadium: City of Manchester Stadium; Attendance: 52,786; Referee: Peter Bankes

26 December 2022 17	Brentford	2–2	Tottenham Hotspur	Brentford
12:30 GMT	Janelt 15'; Toney 54', (yellow card) 63'; Jensen (yellow card) 59'; Mbeumo (yellow card) 76'	Report	Bissouma (yellow card) 60'; Kane 65'; Højbjerg 71'	Stadium: Brentford Community Stadium; Attendance: 17,137; Referee: David Coote

30 December 2022 18	West Ham United	0–2	Brentford	London
19:45 GMT	Coufal (yellow card) 70'	Report	Toney 18'; Dasilva 43'	Stadium: London Stadium; Attendance: 62,467; Referee: Darren England

2 January 2023 19	Brentford	3–1	Liverpool	Brentford
17:30 GMT	Jørgensen (yellow card) 2'; Konaté 19' (o.g.); Wissa 42'; Mbeumo 84'	Report	Elliott (yellow card) 19'; Oxlade-Chamberlain 50'; Thiago (yellow card) 57'; Núñez (yellow card) 72'	Stadium: Brentford Community Stadium; Attendance: 17,163; Referee: Stuart Attwell

14 January 2023 20	Brentford	2–0	Bournemouth	Brentford
17:30 GMT	Toney 39' (pen.); Raya (yellow card) 69'; Jensen 75'	Report	Neto (yellow card) 38'	Stadium: Brentford Community Stadium; Attendance: 17,031; Referee: Jarred Gillett

22 January 2023 21	Leeds United	0–0	Brentford	Leeds
14:00 GMT	Rodrigo (yellow card) 64'; Koch (yellow card) 84'	Report	Toney (yellow card) 71'; Wissa (yellow card) 88'	Stadium: Elland Road; Attendance: 36,260; Referee: Peter Bankes

4 February 2023 22	Brentford	3–0	Southampton	Brentford
15:00 GMT	Mee 41'; Mbeumo 44'; Toney (yellow card) 64'; Jensen 80'	Report	Lavia (yellow card) 59'; Salisu (yellow card) 90'	Stadium: Brentford Community Stadium; Attendance: 17,051; Referee: Darren Bond

11 February 2023 23	Arsenal	1–1	Brentford	Holloway
15:00 GMT	Trossard 66'	Report	Toney 74'; Nørgaard (yellow card) 90+6'; Schade (yellow card) 90+8'	Stadium: Emirates Stadium; Attendance: 60,254; Referee: Peter Bankes

18 February 2023 24	Brentford	1–1	Crystal Palace	Brentford
15:00 GMT	Mee (yellow card) 3'; Nørgaard (yellow card) 75'; Janelt 90+6'	Report	Ayew (yellow card) 13'; Andersen (yellow card) 35'; Eze 69'	Stadium: Brentford Community Stadium; Attendance: 17,122; Referee: Paul Tierney

6 March 2023 26	Brentford	3–2	Fulham	Brentford
20:00 GMT	Pinnock 6'; Toney 53' (pen.); Jensen 85'	Report	Willian (yellow card) 25'; Lukić (yellow card) 35'; Mitrović (yellow card) 61'; Solomon 39'; Carlos Vinícius 90+9'	Stadium: Brentford Community Stadium; Attendance: 17,025; Referee: Anthony Taylor

11 March 2023 27	Everton	1–0	Brentford	Walton
15:00 GMT	McNeil 1'; Coleman (yellow card) 61'; Doucouré (yellow card) 71'	Report	Nørgaard (yellow card) 45+1'	Stadium: Goodison Park; Attendance: 39,036; Referee: Simon Hooper

15 March 2023 7	Southampton	0–2	Brentford	Southampton
19:30 GMT	Bednarek (yellow card) 90+3'	Report	Toney 32', (yellow card) 90+3'; Hickey (yellow card) 79'; Wissa 90+7'	Stadium: St Mary's Stadium; Attendance: 30,438; Referee: Michael Salisbury
Note: The match was originally scheduled for 10 September 2022, but was postponed as a mark of respect following the passing of Queen Elizabeth II.

18 March 2023 28	Brentford	1–1	Leicester City	Brentford
15:00 GMT	Jensen 32'; Nørgaard (yellow card) 40'; Baptiste (yellow card) 89' (yellow-red card) 90+2'	Report	Maddison (yellow card) 22'; Barnes 52'; Soumaré (yellow card) 84'	Stadium: Brentford Community Stadium; Attendance: 17,006; Referee: Darren Bond

1 April 2023 29	Brighton & Hove Albion	3–3	Brentford	Falmer
15:00 BST	Mitoma 21'; Welbeck 28'; Mac Allister 90' (pen.), (yellow card) 90+6'	Report	Jansson 10'; Toney 22'; Pinnock 49'; Hickey (yellow card) 89'	Stadium: Falmer Stadium; Attendance: 31,493; Referee: Michael Oliver

5 April 2023 25	Manchester United	1–0	Brentford	Manchester
20:00 BST	Shaw (yellow card) 24'; Rashford 27'; McTominay (yellow card) 42'; Fernandes (yellow card) 59'	Report	Damsgaard (yellow card) 50'; Nørgaard (yellow card) 61'	Stadium: Old Trafford; Attendance: 73,309; Referee: John Brooks
Note: The match was originally scheduled for 26 February 2023, but was postponed due to Manchester United's involvement in the 2023 EFL Cup final.

8 April 2023 30	Brentford	1–2	Newcastle United	Brentford
15:00 BST	Toney (penalty missed) 29, 45+1' (pen.)	Report	Botman (yellow card) 28'; Raya 53' (o.g.); Isak 61', (yellow card) 87'	Stadium: Brentford Community Stadium; Attendance: 17,107; Referee: Chris Kavanagh

15 April 2023 31	Wolverhampton Wanderers	2–0	Brentford	Wolverhampton
15:00 BST	Costa 27'; João Gomes (yellow card) 35'; Hwang 69'	Report	Jensen (yellow card) 12'	Stadium: Molineux Stadium; Attendance: 30,769; Referee: Paul Tierney

22 April 2023 32	Brentford	1–1	Aston Villa	Brentford
15:00 BST	Nørgaard (yellow card) 23'; Schade (yellow card) 55'; Toney 65'; Janelt (yellow card) 71'	Report	Young (yellow card) 29'; Douglas Luiz (yellow card) 70', (goal) 87'	Stadium: Brentford Community Stadium; Attendance: 17,098; Referee: Michael Salisbury

26 April 2023 33	Chelsea	0–2	Brentford	Fulham
19:45 BST	W. Fofana (yellow card) 72'	Report	Azpilicueta 37' (o.g.); Jensen (yellow card) 46'; Henry (yellow card) 73'; Mbeumo 78'	Stadium: Stamford Bridge; Attendance: 39,929; Referee: Andrew Madley

29 April 2023 34	Brentford	2–1	Nottingham Forest	Brentford
15:00 BST	Henry (yellow card) 29'; Toney 82'; Dasilva 90+4'	Report	Felipe (yellow card) 34'; Danilo 45+1'; Ayew (yellow card) 56'	Stadium: Brentford Community Stadium; Attendance: 17,080; Referee: Peter Bankes

6 May 2023 35	Liverpool	1–0	Brentford	Liverpool
17:30 BST	Van Dijk (yellow card) 5'; Salah 13'; Fabinho (yellow card) 42'; Konaté (yellow card) 54'; Alisson (yellow card) 77'	Report	Mbeumo (yellow card) 27'; Henry (yellow card) 70'	Stadium: Anfield; Attendance: 52,838; Referee: Anthony Taylor

14 May 2023 36	Brentford	2–0	West Ham United	Brentford
14:00 BST	Mbeumo 20'; Wissa 43'; Hickey (yellow card) 76'	Report		Stadium: Brentford Community Stadium; Attendance: 17,075; Referee: Michael Oliver

20 May 2023 37	Tottenham Hotspur	1–3	Brentford	Tottenham
12:30 BST	Kane 8'; Bissouma (yellow card) 45'	Report	Mbeumo 50', 62'; Henry (yellow card) 68'; Wissa 88'	Stadium: Tottenham Hotspur Stadium; Attendance: 61,514; Referee: Jarred Gillett

28 May 2023 38	Brentford	1–0	Manchester City	Brentford
16:30 BST	Wissa (yellow card) 55'; Damsgaard (yellow card) 65'; Janelt (yellow card) 77'; Jørgensen (yellow card) 84'; Pinnock 85'	Report		Stadium: Brentford Community Stadium; Attendance: 17,120; Referee: John Brooks

=== FA Cup ===
Win Draw Loss Fixtures

7 January 2023 Third round	Brentford	0–1	West Ham United	Brentford
17:30 GMT	Wissa (yellow card) 64'	Report	Dawson (yellow card) 73'; Benrahma 79'	Stadium: Brentford Community Stadium; Attendance: 16,725; Referee: Andre Marriner

=== EFL Cup ===
Win Draw Loss Fixtures

23 August 2022 Second round	Colchester United	0–2	Brentford	Colchester
19:45 BST	Dallison (yellow card) 46'; Kazeem (yellow card) 58'	Report	Onyeka (yellow card) 32'; Lewis-Potter 39'; Sørensen 90+1'	Stadium: Colchester Community Stadium; Attendance: 5,516; Referee: James Linington

8 November 2022 Third round	Brentford	1–1 (5–6 p)	Gillingham	Brentford
19:45 GMT	Toney 3'	Report	Jefferies (yellow card) 5'; Mandron 75'	Stadium: Brentford Community Stadium; Attendance: 16,278; Referee: Tim Robinson
	Penalties
	Toney (penalty scored); Ghoddos (penalty scored); Dasilva (penalty scored); Mbeumo (penalty scored); Jensen (penalty scored); Damsgaard (penalty missed)		(penalty scored) Mandron; (penalty scored) Adelakun; (penalty scored) Wright; (penalty scored) Alexander; (penalty scored) Kashket; (penalty scored) MacDonald

== Statistics ==
=== Appearances and goals ===
No.	Pos.	Nat.	Player	League		FA Cup		EFL Cup		Total	
No.	Pos.	Nat.	Player	Apps	Goals	Apps	Goals	Apps	Goals	Apps	Goals
1	GK	(Spain)	David Raya	38	0	0	0	1	0	39	0
2	DF	(Scotland)	Aaron Hickey	23 (3)	0	0	0	0	0	23 (3)	0
3	DF	(Jamaica)	Rico Henry	37	0	0 (1)	0	1	0	38 (1)	0
5	DF	(Jamaica)	Ethan Pinnock	30	3	0	0	1	0	31	3
6	MF	(Denmark)	Christian Nørgaard	22 (1)	1	0	0	1	0	23 (1)	1
7	MF	(Spain)	Sergi Canós	0 (5)	0	0 (1)	0	0	0	0 (6)	0
8	MF	(Denmark)	Mathias Jensen	37	5	1	0	0 (1)	0	39 (1)	5
10	MF	(England)	Josh Dasilva	14 (21)	4	1	0	0 (2)	0	15 (23)	4
11	MF	(Democratic Republic of the Congo)	Yoane Wissa	16 (21)	7	1	0	0 (1)	0	17 (22)	7
13	DF	(Denmark)	Mathias Jørgensen	11 (7)	0	0	0	2	0	13 (7)	0
14	MF	(Iran)	Saman Ghoddos	0 (15)	0	1	0	1 (1)	0	2 (16)	0
15	MF	(Nigeria)	Frank Onyeka	8 (13)	0	0	0	2	0	10 (13)	0
16	DF	(England)	Ben Mee	37	3	1	0	0	0	38	3
17	FW	(England)	Ivan Toney	33	20	0	0	1 (1)	1	34 (1)	21
18	DF	(Sweden)	Pontus Jansson	9 (3)	1	0	0	0	0	9 (3)	1
19	MF	(Cameroon)	Bryan Mbeumo	36 (2)	9	0	0	0 (1)	0	36 (3)	9
20	DF	(Norway)	Kristoffer Ajer	9	0	1	0	0	0	10	0
21	FW	(Turkey)	Halil Dervişoğlu	0 (1)	0	―		1	0	1 (1)	0
22	GK	(Albania)	Thomas Strakosha	0	0	1	0	1	0	2	0
23	MF	(England)	Keane Lewis-Potter	3 (7)	0	1	0	2	1	6 (7)	1
24	MF	(Denmark)	Mikkel Damsgaard	9 (17)	0	1	0	2	0	12 (17)	0
26	MF	(Grenada)	Shandon Baptiste	4 (19)	0	0	0	1	0	5 (19)	0
27	MF	(Germany)	Vitaly Janelt	24 (11)	3	0 (1)	0	1	0	25 (12)	3
29	DF	(Denmark)	Mads Bech Sørensen	0 (4)	0	1	0	1	1	2 (4)	1
30	DF	(Denmark)	Mads Roerslev	12 (8)	0	1	0	2	0	15 (8)	0
33	DF	(Wales)	Fin Stevens	0	0	0	0	1	0	1	0
35	MF	(England)	Ryan Trevitt	0	0	0 (1)	0	0 (1)	0	0 (2)	0
36	MF	(Ukraine)	Yehor Yarmolyuk	0	0	0	0	0 (1)	0	0 (1)	0
Players loaned in during the season
9	FW	(Germany)	Kevin Schade	7 (11)	0	0 (1)	0	―		7 (12)	0

- Source: Soccerbase

=== Goalscorers ===
No	Pos	Nat	Player	PL	FAC	EFLC	Total
17	FW	(England)	Ivan Toney	20	0	1	21
19	MF	(Cameroon)	Bryan Mbeumo	9	0	0	9
11	MF	(Democratic Republic of the Congo)	Yoane Wissa	7	0	0	7
8	MF	(Denmark)	Mathias Jensen	5	0	0	5
10	MF	(England)	Josh Dasilva	4	0	0	4
27	MF	(Germany)	Vitaly Janelt	3	0	0	3
16	DF	(England)	Ben Mee	3	0	0	3
5	DF	(Jamaica)	Ethan Pinnock	3	0	0	3
18	DF	(Sweden)	Pontus Jansson	1	0	0	1
6	MF	(Denmark)	Christian Nørgaard	1	0	0	1
23	MF	(England)	Keane Lewis-Potter	0	0	1	1
29	DF	(Denmark)	Mads Bech Sørensen	0	0	1	1
Opponent				2	0	0	2
Total				56	0	3	59

- Source: Soccerbase, FBREF

=== Discipline ===
No	Pos	Nat	Player	PL		FAC		EFLC		Total		Pts
No	Pos	Nat	Player	Yellow card	Red card	Yellow card	Red card	Yellow card	Red card	Yellow card	Red card	Pts
17	FW	(England)	Ivan Toney	9	0	0	0	0	0	9	0	9
2	DF	(Scotland)	Aaron Hickey	7	0	0	0	0	0	7	0	7
26	MF	(Grenada)	Shandon Baptiste	3	1	0	0	0	0	3	1	6
6	MF	(Denmark)	Christian Nørgaard	6	0	0	0	0	0	6	0	6
8	MF	(Denmark)	Mathias Jensen	5	0	0	0	0	0	5	0	5
19	MF	(Cameroon)	Bryan Mbeumo	5	0	0	0	0	0	5	0	5
24	MF	(Denmark)	Mikkel Damsgaard	4	0	0	0	0	0	4	0	4
3	DF	(Jamaica)	Rico Henry	4	0	0	0	0	0	4	0	4
11	MF	(Democratic Republic of the Congo)	Yoane Wissa	3	0	1	0	0	0	4	0	4
27	MF	(Germany)	Vitaly Janelt	3	0	0	0	0	0	3	0	3
13	DF	(Denmark)	Mathias Jørgensen	2	0	0	0	0	0	2	0	2
16	DF	(England)	Ben Mee	2	0	0	0	0	0	2	0	2
9	FW	(Germany)	Kevin Schade	2	0	0	0	―		2	0	2
10	MF	(England)	Josh Dasilva	1	0	0	0	0	0	1	0	1
1	GK	(Spain)	David Raya	1	0	0	0	0	0	1	0	1
15	MF	(Nigeria)	Frank Onyeka	0	0	0	0	1	0	1	0	1
Total				57	1	1	0	1	0	59	1	62

- Source: FBREF

=== International caps ===
No	Pos	Nat	Player	Caps	Goals	Ref
1	GK	(Spain)	David Raya	1	0	
2	DF	(Scotland)	Aaron Hickey	7	0	
5	DF	(Jamaica)	Ethan Pinnock	1	0	
6	MF	(Denmark)	Christian Nørgaard	3	0	
8	MF	(Denmark)	Mathias Jensen	5	0	
11	MF	(Democratic Republic of the Congo)	Yoane Wissa	6	1	
13	DF	(Denmark)	Mathias Jørgensen	1	0	
14	MF	(Iran)	Saman Ghoddos	3	0	
15	MF	(Nigeria)	Frank Onyeka	5	0	
17	FW	(England)	Ivan Toney	1	0	
19	MF	(Cameroon)	Bryan Mbeumo	9	1	
20	DF	(Norway)	Kristoffer Ajer	1	0	
21	FW	(Turkey)	Halil Dervişoğlu	2	0	
22	GK	(Albania)	Thomas Strakosha	3	0	
24	MF	(Denmark)	Mikkel Damsgaard	9	0	

- Only international caps won while contracted to Brentford are counted.

== Honours ==
- Supporters' Player of the Year: Ben Mee
- Players' Player of the Year: Ivan Toney
- Premier League Goal of the Month: Ivan Toney (September 2022)

== See also ==
- 2022–23 in English football
- List of Brentford F.C. seasons
