= Fin Stevens =

Wales international footballer (born 2003)

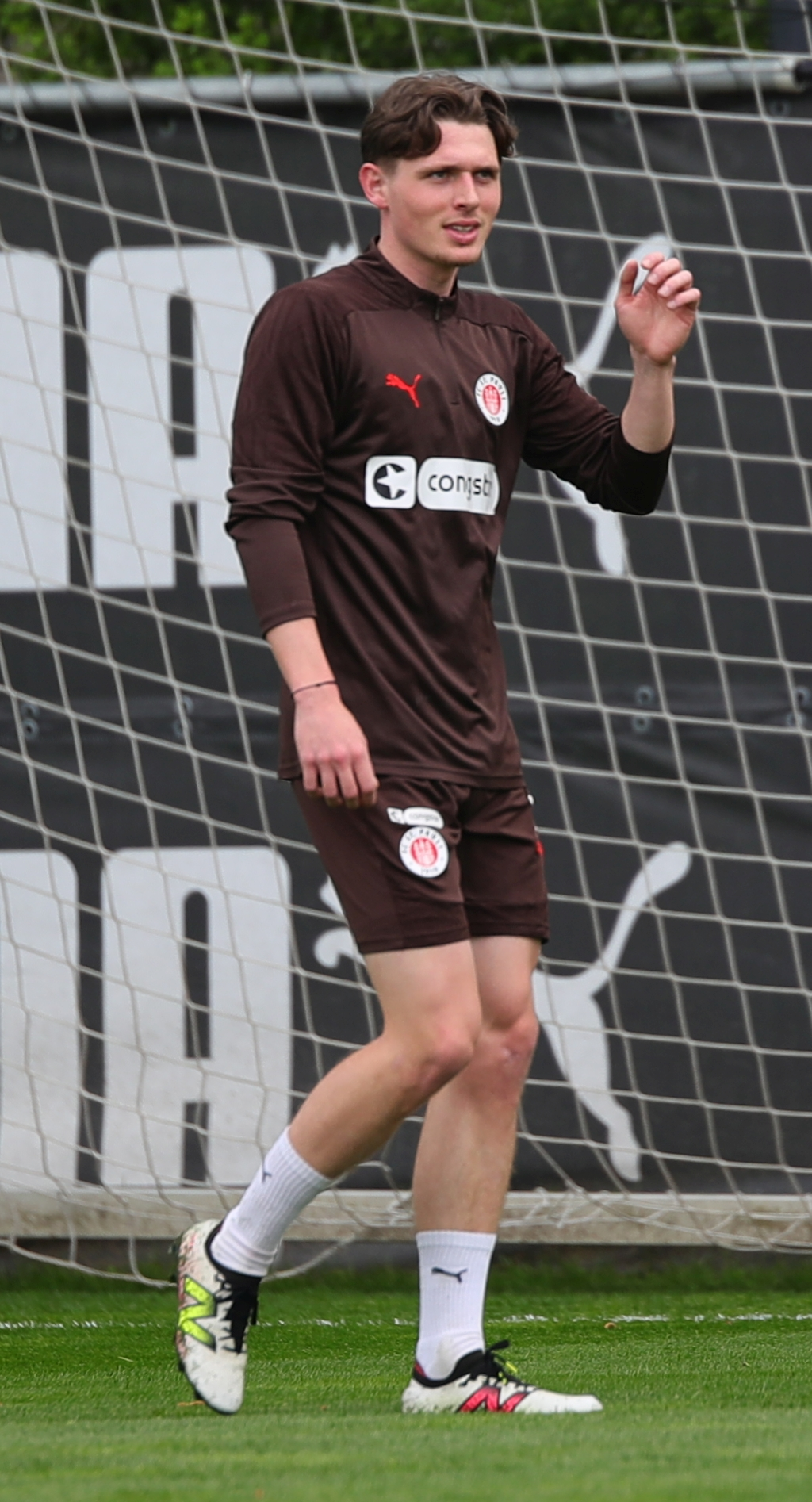
- Stevens training with FC St. Pauli in 2025

Personal information
- Full name: Finley John Stevens
- Date of birth: 10 April 2003 (age 23)
- Place of birth: Brighton, England
- Height: 1.79 m (5 ft 10 in)
- Positions: Right-back; midfielder

Team information
- Current team: Leyton Orient
- Number: 2

Youth career
- 2009–2019: Arsenal

Senior career*
Years	Team	Apps	(Gls)
2019–2020	Worthing	13	(1)
2020–2024	Brentford	3	(0)
2022–2023	→ Swansea City (loan)	5	(0)
2023–2024	→ Oxford United (loan)	34	(1)
2024–2026	St. Pauli	2	(0)
2026–	Leyton Orient	13	(0)

International career^{‡}
2021–2024	Wales U21	20	(1)
2024	Wales	2	(0)
- * Club domestic league appearances and goals as of 19:37, 25 October 2026 (UTC) ‡ National team caps and goals as of 23:20, 15 October 2024 (UTC)

Finley John Stevens (born 10 April 2003) is a professional footballer who plays as a right-back for EFL League One club Leyton Orient and the Wales national team.

Stevens is a graduate of the Arsenal Academy and began his senior career in non-League football with Worthing. He began his professional career with Brentford in 2020. After four years on the fringe of the first team, he transferred to German club St. Pauli in 2024. After making just three substitute appearances in two seasons, Stevens transferred back to English football with Leyton Orient in 2026. Stevens has been capped by Wales at international level.

== Club career ==
=== Early years ===
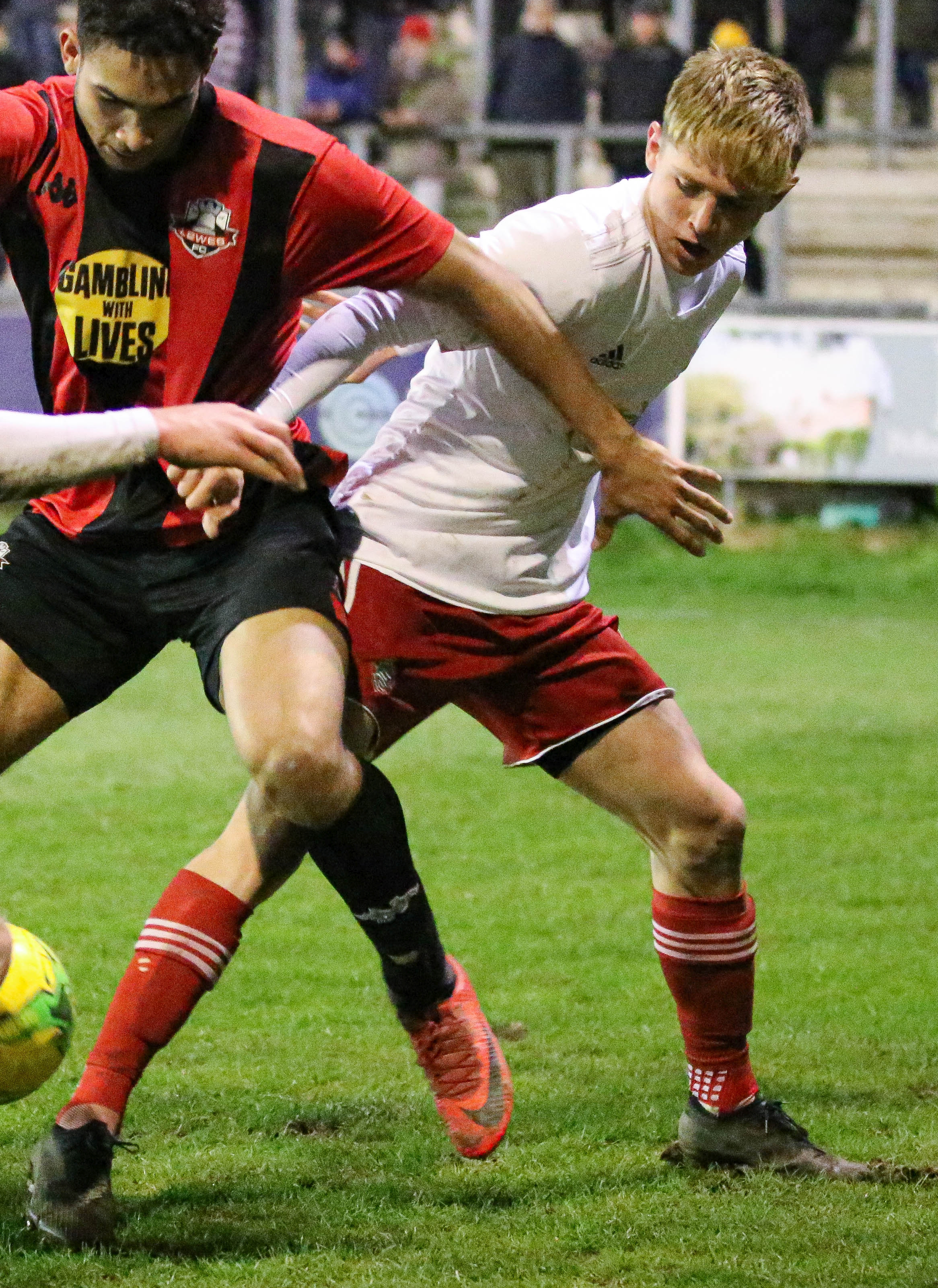
Stevens playing for Worthing in 2020.

Stevens began his career in the Arsenal Academy at the age of six. He progressed to U16 level, before being released at the end of the 2018–19 season and entering the youth system at Isthmian League Premier Division club Worthing. Stevens quickly broke into the first team squad and made 20 appearances during the abandoned 2019–20 season, scoring one goal. He was developed as a right back and encouraged to play in central midfield. Stevens departed Woodside Road in July 2020.

=== Brentford ===
==== 2020–21 season ====
On 28 July 2020, Stevens transferred to the B team at Brentford and signed a two-year contract, with the option of a further year, for an undisclosed fee. A number of players on international duty saw Stevens called into the first team squad on the opening day of the 2020–21 season and he remained an unused substitute during an EFL Cup first round shoot-out victory over Wycombe Wanderers. Three weeks later, he made his debut for the club as a substitute for Saïd Benrahma after 79 minutes of a 3–0 fourth round victory over West London rivals Fulham.

Stevens became a permanent addition to the first team training group and was an unused substitute on 28 occasions during the 2020–21 regular season. He made four further appearances before signing a new three-year contract, with a one-year option, on 11 May 2021. Stevens failed to appear during Brentford's three 2021 playoff matches, but he won a promotion medal by virtue of being an unused substitute during the Final victory over Swansea City. In recognition of his performances for both the first team and B team during the 2020–21 season, Stevens was awarded the B Team Player of the Year award.

==== 2021–22 season ====
Stevens trained with the first team group during the 2021–22 pre-season and was named in each matchday squad during the period. He was a frequent inclusion in the first team group and on the substitutes' bench during the regular season. Following two cup appearances, Stevens made his Premier League debut as a substitute for Sergi Canós after 76 minutes of a 4–1 defeat to Southampton on 11 January 2022. He finished the 2021–22 season with four first team appearances. During the 2022 off-season, Stevens' progress was recognised with promotion into the first team squad and a new five-year contract, with a one year option.

==== 2022–23 season and loan to Swansea City ====
Stevens began the 2022–23 season behind new signing Aaron Hickey, Mads Roerslev and stand-in Kristoffer Ajer in the right back pecking order. Following just a single EFL Cup start during the opening month of the season, Stevens joined Championship club Swansea City on a season-long loan on the final day of the summer transfer window. He made just five substitute appearances before being recalled on 1 January 2023. During the second half of the 2022–23 season, Stevens made four appearances during the B team's Premier League Cup-winning campaign. He was a regular inclusion on the first team substitutes' bench, but failed to make any appearances prior to the end of the season.

==== 2023–24 season and loan to Oxford United ====
On 29 June 2023, Stevens joined League One club Oxford United on loan for the duration of the 2023–24 season. Predominantly a member of the starting lineup, Stevens made 43 appearances during a season which, following victory in the 2024 League One playoff final, culminated in promotion to the Championship. Stevens scored the first professional goal of his career during the season, with the opener in a 3–0 win over Shrewsbury Town on 3 October 2023.

Stevens began the 2024–25 pre-season with the Brentford first team squad, before departing the club in July 2024. He made 10 appearances during his four seasons at the Community Stadium.

=== FC St. Pauli ===
On 26 July 2024, Stevens transferred to Bundesliga club FC St. Pauli and signed an undisclosed-length contract, rumoured to be three years, for an undisclosed fee, reported to be between €600,000 and €1 million. While a regular inclusion on the substitutes' bench, Stevens played just 71 minutes across two appearances during the 2024–25 season and spent three months out of the matchday squad. As a player from a non-EU country, Stevens was not eligible to play for the club's reserve team. Stevens was an unused substitute on 10 occasions during the 2025–26 season and made just one appearance, as a substitute in a 2–1 defeat to RB Leipzig in the penultimate match of the season, soon before the club's relegation to the 2. Bundesliga was confirmed. Stevens transferred out of the club in June 2026.

=== Leyton Orient ===
On 23 June 2026, Stevens transferred to League One club Leyton Orient and signed a three-year contract for an undisclosed fee.

== International career ==
Because of his Cardiff-born grandfather, Stevens was contacted by Wales under-21 manager Paul Bodin in January 2021, about the possibility of pledging his international allegiance to Wales. In March 2021, Stevens was called into the Wales under-21 squad for a training camp and friendly match versus Republic of Ireland under-21. He played the full 90 minutes of the 2–1 defeat. Ahead of the under-21 team's first match of the 2022–23 season, Stevens was named captain of the squad by incoming manager Matt Jones.

Stevens won his maiden call into the Wales senior squad for a pair of friendlies in June 2024 and he started in both matches.

== Career statistics ==
=== Club ===
As of match played 15 August 2026

Appearances and goals by club, season and competition
Club	Season	League			National cup (Note: Includes FA Cup, DFB-Pokal)		League cup (Note: Includes EFL Cup)		Other		Total	
Club	Season	Division	Apps	Goals	Apps	Goals	Apps	Goals	Apps	Goals	Apps	Goals
Worthing	2019–20	Isthmian League Premier Division	13	1	0	0	―		7 (Note: 3 appearances in Isthmian League Cup, 2 appearances in FA Trophy, 2 appearances in Sussex Senior Challenge Cup)	0	20	1
Brentford	2020–21	Championship	2	0	2	0	1	0	0	0	5	0
Brentford	2021–22	Premier League	1	0	2	0	1	0	―		4	0
Brentford	2022–23	Premier League	0	0	0	0	1	0	―		1	0
Brentford	Total		3	0	4	0	3	0	0	0	10	0
Swansea City (loan)	2022–23	Championship	5	0	―		―		―		5	0
Oxford United (loan)	2023–24	League One	34	1	2	0	1	0	6 (Note: 4 appearances in EFL Trophy, 2 appearances in League One play-offs)	0	43	1
FC St. Pauli	2024–25	Bundesliga	1	0	1	0	―		―		2	0
FC St. Pauli	2025–26	Bundesliga	1	0	0	0	―		―		1	0
FC St. Pauli	Total		2	0	1	0	―		―		3	0
Leyton Orient	2026–27	League One	3	0	0	0	1	0	0	0	2	0
Career total			59	2	7	0	5	0	13	0	83	2

=== International ===
As of match played 9 June 2024

Appearances and goals by national team and year
National team	Year	Apps	Goals
Wales	2024	2	0
Total		2	0

== Honours ==
Brentford

- EFL Championship play-offs: 2021

Brentford B

- Premier League Cup: 2022–23

Oxford United

- EFL League One play-offs: 2024

Individual

- Brentford B Mary Halder Award: 2020–21
