= Alex Gilbert (footballer) =

Irish-English footballer (born 2001)

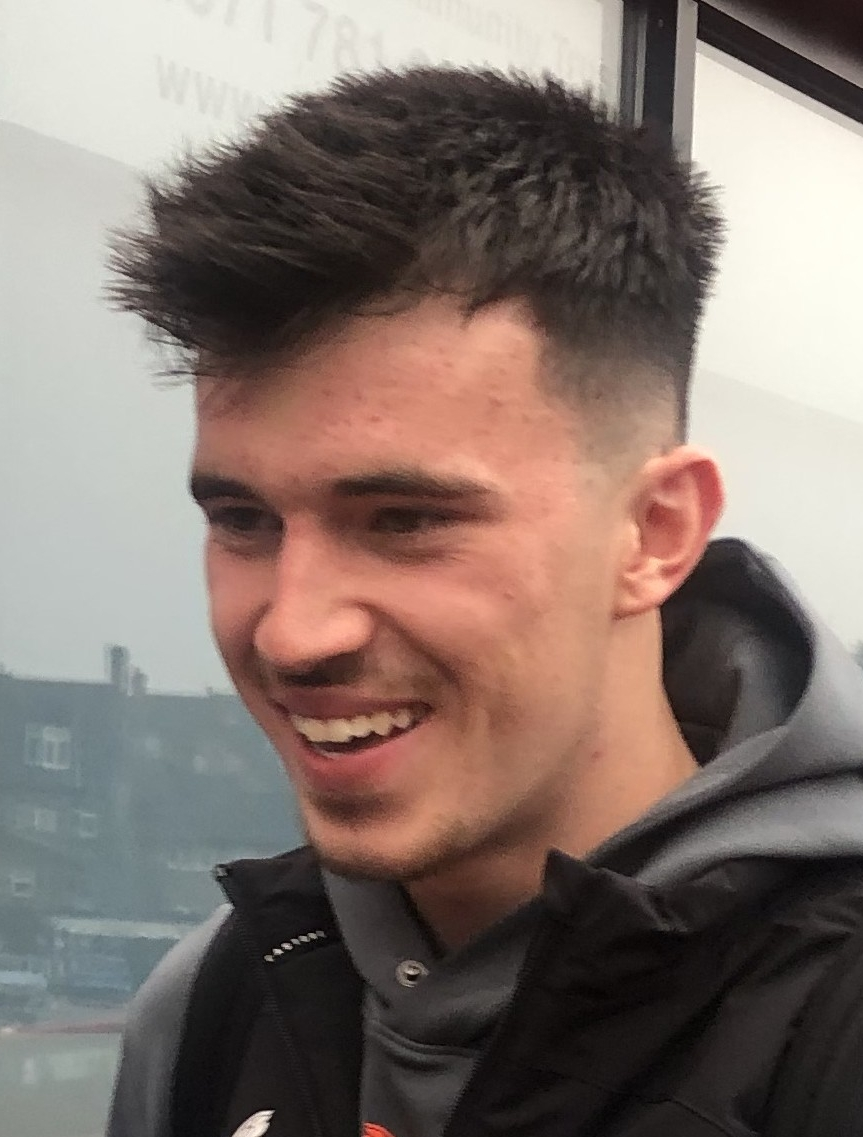
- Gilbert while a Charlton Athletic player in 2025

Personal information
- Full name: Alexander George Henry Gilbert
- Date of birth: 28 December 2001 (age 24)
- Place of birth: Birmingham, England
- Height: 1.83 m (6 ft 0 in)
- Position: Attacking midfielder

Team information
- Current team: Leyton Orient
- Number: 20

Youth career
- 2010–2020: West Bromwich Albion

Senior career*
Years	Team	Apps	(Gls)
2020–2023	Brentford	0	(0)
2021–2022	→ Swindon Town (loan)	8	(0)
2023–2026	Middlesbrough	40	(3)
2025	→ Charlton Athletic (loan)	12	(0)
2026–	Leyton Orient	7	(2)

International career
2019	Republic of Ireland U19	3	(0)
2021	Republic of Ireland U21	6	(0)
- * Club domestic league appearances and goals as of 16:30, 25 October 2026 (UTC)

Alexander George Henry Gilbert (born 28 December 2001) is a professional footballer who plays as an attacking midfielder for EFL League One club Leyton Orient.

Gilbert is a graduate of the West Bromwich Albion Academy and began his professional career with Brentford in 2020. After failing to break into the first team, he transferred to Middlesbrough in 2023. A fringe player during three seasons with the club, Gilbert transferred to Leyton Orient in 2026. Gilbert was capped by the Republic of Ireland at youth level.

== Club career ==
=== West Bromwich Albion ===
An attacking midfielder, Gilbert began his career in the West Bromwich Albion Academy at U9 level and progressed to sign a two-year scholarship deal in 2018. He was offered a professional contract at the end of the 2019–20 season, but declined to sign it and departed The Hawthorns.

=== Brentford ===
==== 2020–21 season ====
On 29 September 2020, Gilbert transferred to the B team at Championship club Brentford on a two-year contract, with the option of a further year, on a free transfer. Gilbert was an unused substitute in nine first team league matches between December 2020 and March 2021 and made what would be his only first team appearances for the club with two FA Cup appearances. He was not involved during Brentford's successful 2021 playoff campaign and finished the 2020–21 B team season with 10 goals from 22 appearances.

==== 2021–22 season and loan to Swindon Town ====
Gilbert was involved with the first team squad during the 2021–22 pre-season and on transfer deadline day August 2021, he joined League Two club Swindon Town on loan until the end of the 2021–22 season. He made 12 appearances prior to the termination of the loan on 4 January 2022. Gilbert played the second half of the 2021–22 season with the Brentford B team, with whom he won the London Senior Cup.

==== 2022–23 season ====
The one-year option on Gilbert's contract was taken up at the end of the 2021–22 season and he captained the B team during the 2022–23 season. On 8 November 2022, Gilbert won his first senior call-up for nearly two years, for an EFL Cup third round match versus Gillingham and he remained an unused substitute during the shoot-out defeat. He was included in the first team squad for its mid-season training camp in Girona and scored in a 2–1 friendly defeat to Bordeaux. Half of Gilbert's 16 goals scored during the B team season came in the team's victorious 2022–23 Premier League Cup campaign. His performances were recognised with the team's Player of the Year award.

Gilbert entered discussions over a contract extension at the end of the 2022–23 season, which proved fruitless. He departed the club in July 2023 and finished his B team career with 79 appearances.

=== Middlesbrough ===
==== 2023–24 season ====
On 4 July 2023, Gilbert transferred to Championship club Middlesbrough and signed a four-year contract. Though he was signed as a free agent, the club was required to pay a compensation fee of "around £1 million", due to his age. Gilbert was a regular inclusion on the substitutes' bench during the 2023–24 season, but played just 80 minutes across his 10 substitute appearances in league matches. He started in Middlesbrough's final two matches of the season and marked his maiden start for the club with the first senior goal of his career, in a 4–1 victory over Cardiff City on 27 April 2024.

==== 2024–25 season and loan to Charlton Athletic ====
Though included in most matchday squads, Gilbert appeared sparingly during the first three months of the 2024–25 season, before breaking into the team in a substitute role. He made 10 appearances and scored one goal prior to departing to join League One club Charlton Athletic on loan until the end of the 2024–25 season on the final day of the winter transfer window. He made 14 appearances during the remainder of Charlton's 2025 Championship play-off final-winning season.

==== 2025–26 season ====
Gilbert was included in the matchday squad sparingly during the early months of the 2025–26 season. He became a regular inclusion under new head coach Kim Hellberg in November 2025, but had to wait until 5 December to make his first appearance of the season, which came with a goalscoring start in a 4–1 win over Hull City. Gilbert made 21 further appearances during the remainder of the 2025–26 season, split between starting and substitute roles, but he did not appear during the club's unsuccessful playoff campaign. Gilbert was released at the end of the season, but engaged in talks regarding his playing role if he was to remain with the club, which proved unsuccessful.

=== Leyton Orient ===
On 3 September 2026, Gilbert signed a three-year contract with League One club Leyton Orient on a free transfer.

== International career ==
Gilbert was capped by the Republic of Ireland at U19 and U21 level.

== Personal life ==
Gilbert supported Aston Villa while growing up.

== Career statistics ==
As of match played 19 September 2026

Appearances and goals by club, season and competition
Club	Season	League			FA Cup		EFL Cup		Other		Total	
Club	Season	Division	Apps	Goals	Apps	Goals	Apps	Goals	Apps	Goals	Apps	Goals
Brentford	2020–21	Championship	0	0	2	0	0	0	―		2	0
Brentford	2021–22	Premier League	0	0	―		―		―		0	0
Brentford	2022–23	Premier League	0	0	0	0	0	0	―		0	0
Brentford	Total		0	0	2	0	0	0	―		2	0
Swindon Town (loan)	2021–22	League Two	8	0	1	0	―		3 (Note: Appearance(s) in EFL Trophy)	0	12	0
Middlesbrough	2023–24	Championship	12	1	1	0	2	0	―		15	1
Middlesbrough	2024–25	Championship	7	1	1	0	2	0	―		10	1
Middlesbrough	2025–26	Championship	21	1	1	0	0	0	0	0	22	1
Middlesbrough	Total		40	3	3	0	4	0	0	0	47	3
Charlton Athletic (loan)	2024–25	League One	12	0	―		―		2 (Note: Appearances in League One play-offs)	0	14	0
Leyton Orient	2026–27	League One	2	1	0	0	0	0	1	0	3	1
Career total			62	4	6	0	4	0	6	0	78	4

== Honours ==
Brentford B

- London Senior Cup: 2021–22
- Premier League Cup: 2022–23

Charlton Athletic

- EFL League One play-offs: 2025

Individual

- Brentford B Player of the Year: 2022–23
