= Ryan Trevitt =

English footballer (born 2003)

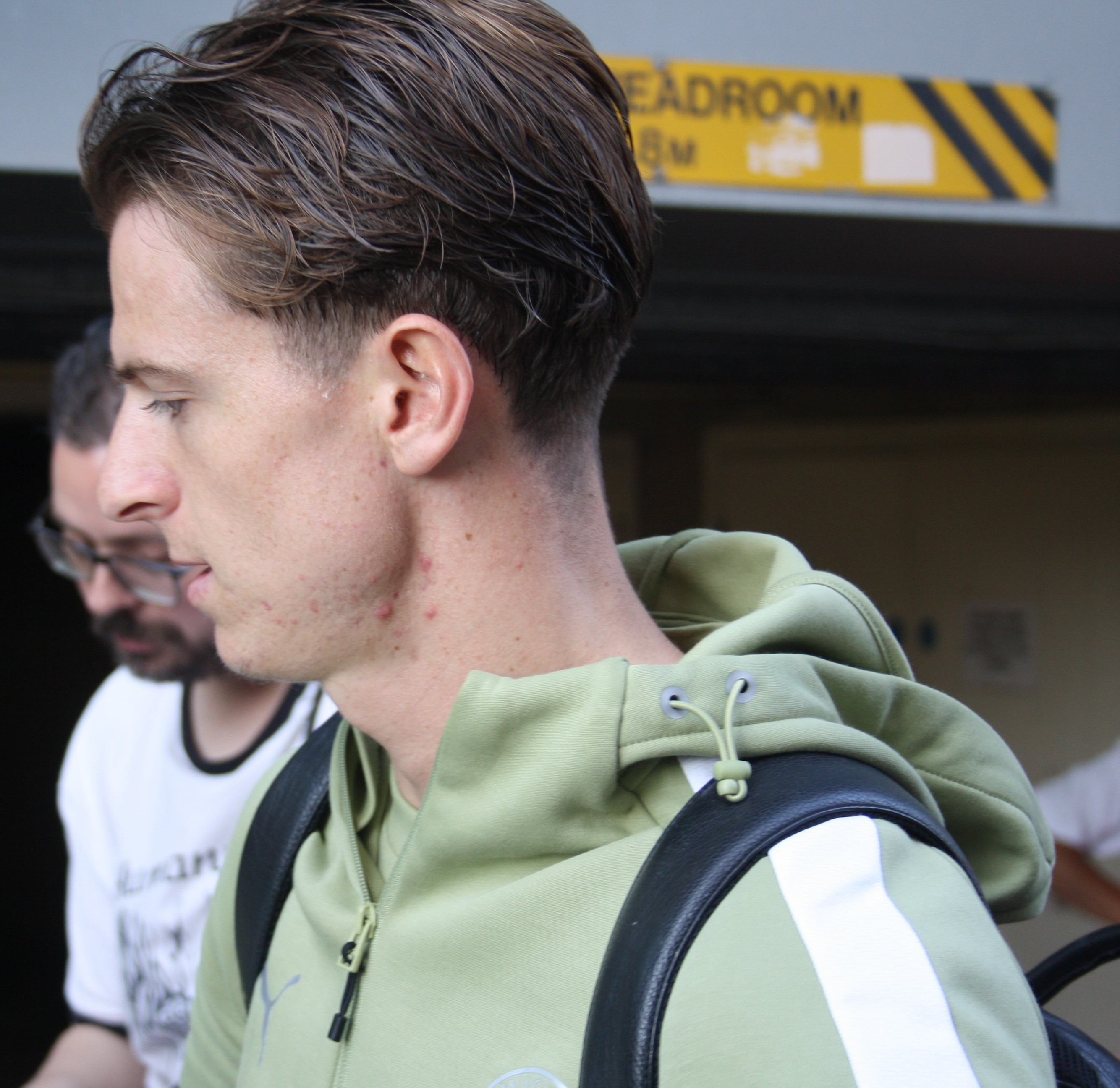
- Trevitt while with Wigan Athletic in 2025

Personal information
- Full name: Ryan Joseph Trevitt
- Date of birth: 12 March 2003 (age 23)
- Place of birth: Guildford, England
- Height: 1.70 m (5 ft 7 in)
- Position: Central midfielder

Team information
- Current team: Wigan Athletic
- Number: 14

Youth career
- –2021: Leatherhead Youth
- 2021–2022: Brentford

Senior career*
Years	Team	Apps	(Gls)
2022–2026	Brentford	1	(0)
2023–2024	→ Exeter City (loan)	19	(3)
2025	→ Exeter City (loan)	11	(1)
2025–2026	→ Wigan Athletic (loan)	12	(0)
2026–	Wigan Athletic	1	(0)
- * Club domestic league appearances and goals as of 14:07, 10 September 2026 (UTC)

Ryan Joseph Trevitt (born 12 March 2003) is an English professional footballer who plays as a central midfielder for EFL League One club Wigan Athletic.

Trevitt began his professional career with Brentford in 2021 and was promoted into the first team squad in 2023. A fringe player at the Premier League club, he played much of the remainder of his contract on loan with English Football League clubs Exeter City and Wigan Athletic. After his release in 2026, Trevitt transferred to Wigan Athletic permanently.

== Club career ==
=== Brentford ===
After playing for Leatherhead Youth between U6 and U18 level and trialling with West London clubs Chelsea, Fulham and Queens Park Rangers, Trevitt joined the Brentford B on an extended trial in late 2020. On 11 January 2021, he signed an 18-month contract, with a one-year option, as a free agent. During the 2021–22 season, Trevitt trained with the first team, appeared in first team friendlies and was a part of the B team's London Senior Cup-winning squad. The option on his contract was exercised in May 2022 and two months later he signed a new two-year contract, with a one-year option.

==== 2022–23 season ====
Trevitt was called into the first team's 2022–23 pre-season and mid-season training camps. He made two cup appearances as a substitute during the regular season and was an unused substitute during seven other matches. Trevitt scored five goals in 9 appearances during the B team's 2022–23 Premier League Cup-winning campaign, which included the opener in the 2–0 Final victory over Blackburn Rovers. He finished the B team season with 28 appearances and 16 goals. During the 2023 off-season, Trevitt was promoted into the first team squad and signed a new three-year contract, with a one-year option.

==== 2023–24 season and loan to Exeter City ====
On 14 July 2023, Trevitt joined League One club Exeter City on a season-long loan. A starter during the first half of the season when fit, Trevitt's performances and three goals in October 2023 won him the club's Player of the Month award. His brace in a 3–2 EFL Cup fourth round defeat to Middlesbrough on 31 October was recognised with a nomination for the competition's Player of the Round award. On 3 January 2024, Trevitt underwent surgery on a twisted ankle suffered during a 2–0 defeat to Cambridge United on 22 December 2023. He was recalled by Brentford five days later and ended the loan on 23 appearances and five goals. After returning to fitness, Trevitt was an unused substitute on two occasions during the remainder of the 2023–24 season.

==== 2024–25 season and loan return to Exeter City ====
During a 2024–25 pre-season shortened by a calf injury, Trevitt made three appearances, including one at right back. He was again deployed in the position during his first appearance of the regular season, a start in a 1–0 EFL Cup second round victory over Colchester United on 28 August 2024. Following a second EFL Cup start, Trevitt made his Premier League debut as a substitute late in a 3–1 defeat to Tottenham Hotspur on 21 September. He was an unused substitute on 11 further occasions during the first half of the 2024–25 season. After recovering from an achilles injury, Trevitt returned to Exeter City on loan for the remainder of the season on 30 January 2025. While carrying a minor ankle injury, he made 12 appearances and scored one goal before suffering a season-ending hamstring injury during a match on 1 April 2025.

=== Wigan Athletic ===
On 31 July 2025, Trevitt joined League One club Wigan Athletic on a season-long loan. He made 11 appearances before suffering a thigh injury in late September 2025, which required surgery. A hernia problem was discovered during Trevitt's rehabilitation, which also required surgery. He returned to match play in mid-April 2026, but only managed two appearances before suffering a season-ending injury. Trevitt made 14 appearances during a mid-table 2025-26 season. Trevitt was released by Brentford at the end of the season, but remained with the club during the 2026 off-season in order to continue his injury rehabilitation.

On 21 July 2026, Trevitt signed a two-year contract with Wigan Athletic on a free transfer. Trevitt began the 2026–27 regular season still in injury rehabilitation and following his debut substitute appearance on 22 August, he suffered a "freak" hamstring injury in training.

== Representative career ==
Trevitt represented the ISFA South team at U17 level and England Futsal at U19 level.

== Style of play ==
Trevitt has been described "an old school all-round midfielder". "He can build as a six, he can arrive in the box from deeper positions with energy", while "winning the ball back high, protecting the backline" out of possession.

== Personal life ==
Trevitt attended St John's School, Leatherhead. In addition to football, he played rugby union as a fly-half and was a member of the Harlequins academy.

== Career statistics ==
As of match played 5 September 2026

Appearances and goals by club, season and competition
Club	Season	League			FA Cup		League Cup		Other		Total	
Club	Season	Division	Apps	Goals	Apps	Goals	Apps	Goals	Apps	Goals	Apps	Goals
Brentford	2022–23	Premier League	0	0	1	0	1	0	―		2	0
Brentford	2023–24	Premier League	0	0	―		―		―		0	0
Brentford	2024–25	Premier League	1	0	0	0	2	0	―		3	0
Brentford	Total		1	0	1	0	3	0	―		5	0
Exeter City (loan)	2023–24	League One	19	3	1	0	3	2	0	0	23	5
Exeter City (loan)	2024–25	League One	11	1	1	0	―		―		12	1
Wigan Athletic (loan)	2025–26	League One	12	0	0	0	2	0	0	0	14	0
Wigan Athletic	2026–27	League One	1	0	0	0	0	0	0	0	1	0
Career total			44	4	3	0	8	2	0	0	55	6

== Honours ==
Brentford B

- London Senior Cup: 2021–22
- Premier League Cup: 2022–23

Individual

- Brentford B Mary Halder Award: 2022–23
- Exeter City Player of the Month: October 2023
