= Daniel Oyegoke =

English footballer (born 2003)

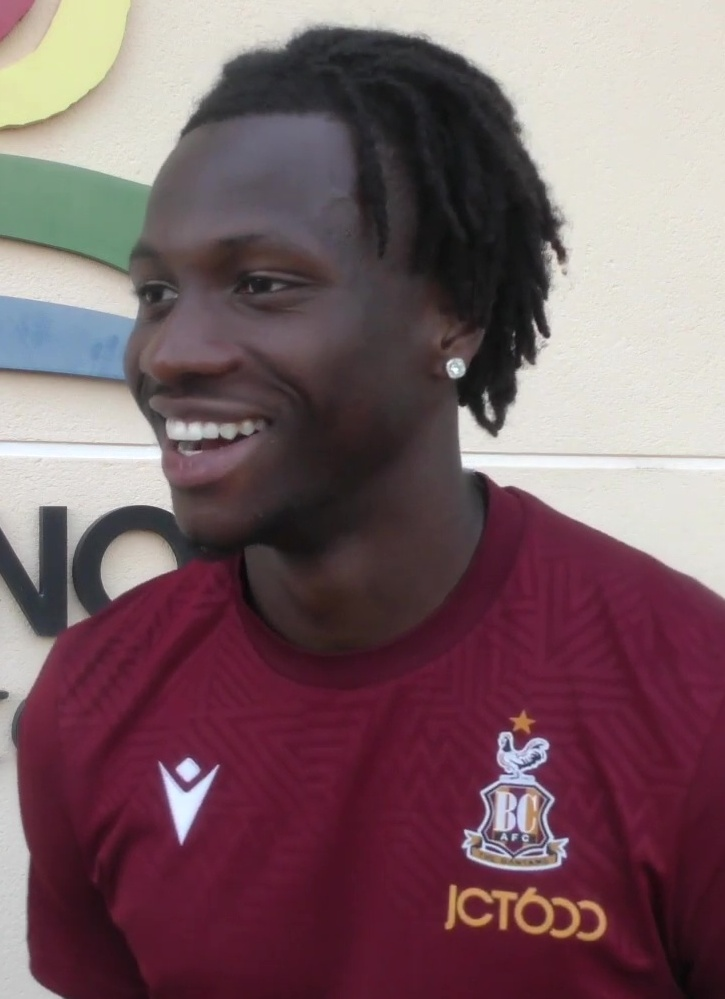
- Oyegoke with Bradford City in 2023

Personal information
- Full name: Daniel Oladele Akinbiyi Oyegoke
- Date of birth: 3 January 2003 (age 23)
- Place of birth: Barnet, England
- Height: 1.88 m (6 ft 2 in)
- Position: Right-back

Team information
- Current team: Lincoln City
- Number: 33

Youth career
- –2017: Barnet
- 2017–2021: Arsenal
- 2021–2022: Brentford

Senior career*
Years	Team	Apps	(Gls)
2022–2024	Brentford	0	(0)
2022–2023	→ Milton Keynes Dons (loan)	13	(0)
2023–2024	→ Bradford City (loan)	24	(0)
2024–2025	Heart of Midlothian	19	(1)
2025–2026	Hellas Verona	21	(0)
2026–	Lincoln City	8	(0)

International career
2019	England U16	4	(0)
2019	England U17	2	(0)
2021	England U18	1	(0)
2021–2022	England U19	15	(0)
2022–2023	England U20	10	(1)
Medal record
Men's football
Representing England
UEFA European Under-19 Championship
Winner	2022 Slovakia
- * Club domestic league appearances and goals as of 17:06, 21 November 2026 (UTC)

Daniel Oladele Akinbiyi Oyegoke (born 3 January 2003) is an English professional footballer who plays as a right-back for EFL Championship club Lincoln City.

Oyegoke is a product of the Barnet and Arsenal academies and began his professional career with Brentford in 2021. A member of the club's B team, he gained his first senior experience on loan at EFL clubs Milton Keynes Dons and Bradford City. After failing to break into the Brentford first team squad, Oyegoke transferred to Heart of Midlothian in 2024. After a half-season spell, he transferred to Hellas Verona in 2025. Oyegoke returned to English football with Lincoln City in 2026. He was capped by England at youth level.

== Club career ==
=== Early years ===
After beginning his youth career as a forward in the Barnet Academy, Oyegoke moved to the Arsenal Academy in 2017. While at Hale End, he was converted into a right back and progressed to sign a scholarship deal at the end of the 2018–19 season. At the end of his two-year scholarship, Oyegoke elected to decline the offer of a professional contract and departed the club.

=== Brentford ===
On 1 July 2021, Oyegoke transferred to the B team at Premier League club Brentford and signed a three-year contract, with the option of a further year, for an undisclosed fee. He made 24 B team appearances during the 2021–22 season and was an unused substitute during two first team cup matches. Oyegoke was called into the first team's 2022–23 pre-season training camp in Germany and made two friendly appearances.

On 27 July 2022, Oyegoke joined League One club Milton Keynes Dons on a season-long loan. He made 18 appearances, predominantly as a starter, before being recalled by Brentford on 2 January 2023. During the second half of the 2022–23 season, Oyegoke was a part of the B team's 2022–23 Premier League Cup-winning squad.

On 28 June 2023, Oyegoke joined League Two club Bradford City on a season-long loan. A second yellow card led Oyegoke to be sent off for the first time in his career after 41 minutes of the opening match of the 2023–24 season. He made regular appearances until mid-November, when he underwent surgery on a shoulder injury. One month later, it was announced that the club would retain Oyegoke's registration until the end of the season, on reduced terms. He returned to match play on 16 March 2024 and ended the 2023–24 season (in which the Bantams narrowly missed the League Two play-offs) with 28 appearances. Despite being offered a new contract, Oyegoke departed Brentford on 21 June 2024.

=== Heart of Midlothian ===
On 21 June 2024, Oyegoke transferred to Scottish Premiership club Heart of Midlothian and signed a three-year contract for an undisclosed "moderate six-figure" fee. During the first half of the 2024–25 season, he made 25 appearances and scored the first professional goal of his career, in a 4–0 victory over St Mirren on 19 October 2024. Oyegoke departed the club on 28 January 2025, "for a profit".

=== Hellas Verona ===
On 28 January 2025, Oyegoke transferred to Serie A club Hellas Verona and signed a 3 1/2-year contract for an undisclosed "six figure" fee. He made five appearances during the remainder of the 2024–25 season. Oyegoke made 16 appearances during the 2025–26 season, in which the club was relegated to Serie B. After two early-2026–27 season appearances, Oyegoke transferred out of the club late in the summer 2026 transfer window.

=== Lincoln City ===
On 1 September 2026, Oyegoke transferred to Championship club Lincoln City and signed a four-year contract for an undisclosed fee. He made his debut in the EFL Cup third round defeat against Bournemouth, starting the game in a 0–4 defeat.

== International career ==
Oyegoke was capped by England between U16 and U20 level. He was a part of the 2022 UEFA European U19 Championship Finals squad and started in two of his five appearances at the Finals, including the victory over Israel in the Final.

In September 2022, Oyegoke was named in the England U20 squad for its Costa Cálida Supercup campaign. He started in the opening match versus Chile and scored his first international goal in the 3–0 win. Oyegoke was a member of England's 2023 U20 World Cup squad and started in every match prior to the team's round-of-16 exit.

== Personal life ==
Oyegoke is of Nigerian descent. He attended Aldenham School.

== Career statistics ==
As of 21 November 2026

Appearances and goals by club, season and competition
Club	Season	League			National cup (Note: Includes FA Cup, Scottish Cup, Coppa Italia)		League cup (Note: Includes EFL Cup, Scottish League Cup)		Europe		Other		Total	
Club	Season	Division	Apps	Goals	Apps	Goals	Apps	Goals	Apps	Goals	Apps	Goals	Apps	Goals
Arsenal U21	2020–21	―									1 (Note: Appearance(s) in EFL Trophy)	0	1	0
Brentford	2021–22	Premier League	0	0	0	0	0	0	―		―		0	0
Milton Keynes Dons (loan)	2022–23	League One	13	0	0	0	2	0	―		3	0	18	0
Bradford City (loan)	2023–24	League Two	24	0	0	0	2	0	―		2	0	28	0
Heart of Midlothian	2024–25	Scottish Premiership	19	1	1	0	0	0	6 (Note: Five appearances in UEFA Conference League, one appearance in UEFA Europa League)	0	―		26	1
Hellas Verona	2024–25	Serie A	5	0	―		―		―		―		5	0
Hellas Verona	2025–26	Serie A	15	0	1	0	―		―		―		16	0
Hellas Verona	2026–27	Serie B	1	0	1	0	―		―		―		2	0
Hellas Verona	Total		21	0	2	0	―		―		―		23	0
Lincoln City	2026–27	Championship	8	0	0	0	1	0	―		―		9	0
Career total			85	1	3	0	5	0	6	0	6	0	105	1

== Honours ==
Brentford B

- Premier League Cup: 2022–23

England U19

- UEFA European U19 Championship: 2022
