= Michael Olakigbe =

English footballer (born 2004)

Personal information
- Full name: Michael Oluwakorede Olakigbe
- Date of birth: 6 April 2004 (age 22)
- Place of birth: Lambeth, England
- Height: 1.80 m (5 ft 11 in)
- Position: Winger

Team information
- Current team: WSG Tirol (on loan from Brentford)
- Number: 17

Youth career
- Erith & Belvedere
- East Soccer Base
- –2018: Queens Park Rangers
- 2018–2022: Fulham
- 2022–2023: Brentford

Senior career*
| Years | Team | Apps | (Gls) |
| 2023– | Brentford | 8 | (0) |
| 2024 | → Peterborough United (loan) | 5 | (0) |
| 2024–2025 | → Wigan Athletic (loan) | 13 | (0) |
| 2025 | → Chesterfield (loan) | 17 | (2) |
| 2026 | → Swindon Town (loan) | 14 | (1) |
| 2026– | → WSG Tirol (loan) | 5 | (2) |

International career
| 2021–2022 | England U18 | 9 | (2) |
| 2023 | England U20 | 2 | (0) |
- * Club domestic league appearances and goals as of 14:02, 10 September 2026 (UTC)

Michael Oluwakorede Olakigbe (born 6 April 2004) is an English professional footballer who plays as a winger for Austrian Bundesliga club WSG Tirol, on loan from Premier League club Brentford.

Olakigbe is a product of the Fulham and Queens Park Rangers academies and began his professional career with Brentford in 2022. He has been capped by England at youth level.

== Club career ==
=== Early years ===
Following spells with Erith & Belvedere and the East Soccer Base and Queens Park Rangers academies, Olakigbe joined the Fulham Academy in 2018. He progressed through the ranks from U14 level to sign a scholarship deal at the end of the 2019–20 season. He departed the club in July 2022.

=== Brentford ===
==== 2022–23 season ====
On 29 July 2022, Olakigbe transferred to the B team at Premier League club Brentford and signed a four-year contract, with the option of a further year, for an undisclosed fee. Injured at the time of his arrival, Olakigbe made his B team debut in October 2022 and progressed sufficiently to be included in the first team squad for its mid-season training camp in Girona. He made three friendly appearances during the period and trained with the first team during the 2022–23 season. On 1 April 2023, Olakigbe won his maiden call into a first team matchday squad and he remained an unused substitute during a 3–3 draw with Brighton & Hove Albion. He made 9 appearances during the B team's 2022–23 Premier League Cup-winning campaign and scored seven goals overall during the season.

==== 2023–24 season and loan to Peterborough United ====
Olakigbe was included in the first team group during the 2023–24 pre-season and made five friendly appearances, scoring two goals. He made his competitive debut for the club with a start in a EFL Cup second round shoot-out win over Newport County on 29 August 2023. Thereafter, Olakigbe was included in the majority of Brentford's matchday squads and he made 11 substitute appearances through to mid-January 2024. During his run of appearances, Olakigbe signed a new 4 1/2-year contract, with the option of a further year. On 30 January 2024, he joined League One club Peterborough United on loan until the end of the 2023–24 season. During a spell interrupted by suspension and injury, Olakigbe made just five appearances and was not involved in the club's unsuccessful playoff campaign.

==== 2024–25 season and loans to Wigan Athletic and Chesterfield ====
On 29 May 2024, Olakigbe joined League One club Wigan Athletic on loan for the duration of the 2024–25 season. In early July, an "innocuous challenge" during a practice match at the club's pre-season training camp resulted in Olakigbe missing the first six weeks of the regular season with a fractured fibula. He made 18 appearances and scored one goal prior to his recall on 27 January 2025. Four days later, Olakigbe joined League Two club Chesterfield on loan until the end of the 2024–25 season. He made 18 appearances and scored two goals during the remainder of the season, which culminated in a playoff semi-final defeat. Following the expiry of the loan, Olakigbe played in the remainder of Brentford B's season and was part of the 2024–25 Professional Development League-winning squad.

==== 2025–26 season and loan to Swindon Town ====
Olakigbe played exclusively B team football during the first half of the 2025–26 season and he joined League Two club Swindon Town on loan on 2 January 2026. Deployed predominantly as a substitute, Olakigbe made 18 appearances and scored one goal during the remainder of a 2025–26 season in which the club fell short of the playoffs.

==== 2026–27 season and loan to WSG Tirol ====
On 30 June 2026, Olakigbe joined Austrian Bundesliga club WSG Tirol on loan for the duration of the 2026–27 season.

== International career ==
Olakigbe is eligible to represent England or Nigeria at international level. In March 2021, Olakigbe was called into an England U17 training camp and played in a hybrid friendly versus Watford U23 during the camp. In September 2021, he won his first U18 call-up to a training camp and friendly versus Wales. He made his international debut as a half-time substitute for Samuel Mather during the 1–1 draw. Olakigbe won nine U18 caps and scored two goals during the 2021–22 season and was a part of the squad which emerged victorious in a four-nation tournament hosted in Zagreb in June 2022.

On 1 September 2023, Olakigbe won his maiden call into the U20 squad, for a training camp at St George's Park. One month later, he was called into the squad for the team's opening pair of Under 20 Elite League fixtures, both of which he appeared in.

== Personal life ==
Olakigbe is British born and of Nigerian descent. He grew up in Bexleyheath and his mother runs the Pro Ballers football academy in the area.

== Career statistics ==
As of match played 5 September 2026

Appearances and goals by club, season and competition
| Club | Season | League | | | National cup (Note: Includes FA Cup, Austrian Cup) | | League cup (Note: Includes EFL Cup) | | Other | | Total | |
| Club | Season | Division | Apps | Goals | Apps | Goals | Apps | Goals | Apps | Goals | Apps | Goals |
|---|---|---|---|---|---|---|---|---|---|---|---|---|
| Brentford | 2022–23 | Premier League | 0 | 0 | 0 | 0 | 0 | 0 | ― | | 0 | 0 |
| Brentford | 2023–24 | Premier League | 8 | 0 | 2 | 0 | 2 | 0 | ― | | 12 | 0 |
| Brentford | Total | | 8 | 0 | 2 | 0 | 2 | 0 | ― | | 12 | 0 |
| Peterborough United (loan) | 2023–24 | League One | 5 | 0 | ― | | ― | | 0 | 0 | 5 | 0 |
| Wigan Athletic (loan) | 2024–25 | League One | 13 | 0 | 2 | 0 | 0 | 0 | 3 (Note: Appearance(s) in EFL Trophy) | 1 | 18 | 1 |
| Chesterfield (loan) | 2024–25 | League Two | 17 | 2 | ― | | ― | | 1 (Note: Appearance in League Two play-offs) | 0 | 18 | 2 |
| Swindon Town (loan) | 2025–26 | League Two | 16 | 1 | 1 | 0 | ― | | 1 | 0 | 18 | 1 |
| WSG Tirol (loan) | 2026–27 | Austrian Bundesliga | 5 | 2 | 1 | 1 | ― | | ― | | 6 | 3 |
| Career total | | | 64 | 5 | 6 | 1 | 2 | 0 | 5 | 1 | 77 | 7 |

== Honours ==
Brentford B

- Premier League Cup: 2022–23
