= Kyreece Lisbie =

English footballer (born 2003)

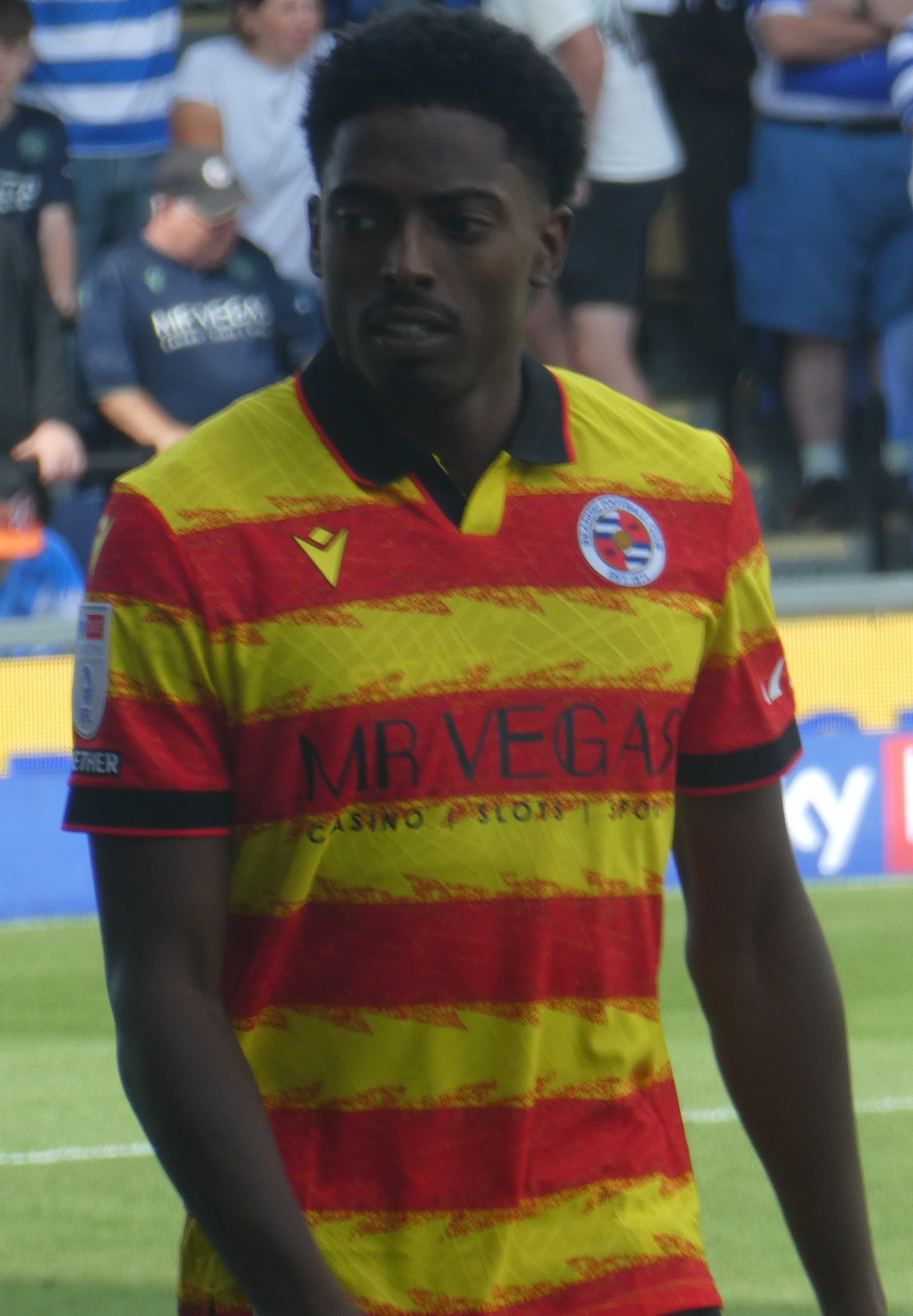
- Lisbie playing for Reading in 2026

Personal information
- Full name: Kyreece Joshua Lisbie
- Date of birth: 1 December 2003 (age 22)
- Place of birth: Waltham Forest, England
- Height: 1.80 m (5 ft 11 in)
- Positions: Winger; forward

Team information
- Current team: Reading
- Number: 19

Youth career
- –2017: Leyton Orient
- –2020: Shield Academy
- 2020–2021: Cray Valley Paper Mills
- 2021–2022: Watford
- 2022–2025: Brentford

Senior career*
Years	Team	Apps	(Gls)
2021	Cray Valley Paper Mills	1	(0)
2025–2026	Colchester United	49	(11)
2025	→ Braintree Town (loan)	5	(1)
2026–	Reading	12	(5)
- * Club domestic league appearances and goals as of 12:38, 26 October 2026 (UTC)

Kyreece Joshua Lisbie (born 1 December 2003) is an English professional footballer who plays for as a winger or forward for EFL League One club Reading.

Lisbie is a product of the Leyton Orient and Watford academies and played his first senior football for Cray Valley Paper Mills. After 2 1/2 years as a professional with Brentford B, Lisbie transferred to Colchester United in 2025. He transferred to Reading in 2026.

== Club career ==
=== Early years ===
A forward or winger able to operate on either flank, Lisbie began his career alongside his brother Kyrell in the Leyton Orient youth system, at the same time his father was a senior player at the club. Following the brothers' release in 2017, for being "too injury prone", they failed trials at Colchester United, Watford and Millwall. Following a spell in the Shield Academy, the brothers joined the U23 team at Isthmian League South East Division club Cray Valley Paper Mills in early 2020. Lisbie progressed to make two substitute appearances for the first team late in the 2020–21 season. Following a spell on trial with West Ham United, both brothers impressed during a second trial with Watford and signed contracts in October 2021. The brothers were released by Watford at the end of the 2021–22 season.

=== Brentford ===
On 13 July 2022, Lisbie signed a one-year contract with the B team at Premier League club Brentford, with the option of a further year, on a free transfer. Despite not featuring in the Final victory over Blackburn Rovers due to a season-ending patellar tendinopathy suffered in March 2023, Lisbie received a 2022–23 Premier League Cup-winner's medal in recognition of his seven appearances and two goals earlier in the competition. The one-year option on his contract was taken up at the end of the 2022–23 season, with a further one-year option attached. Following a second injury, Lisbie returned to match play on 13 December 2023 and he signed a new one-year contract at the end of the 2023–24 season.

Following surgery on an injury during the 2024 off-season, Lisbie returned to match play in early October 2024. He scored eight goals in 18 appearances before transferring away from the club on the final day of the 2024–25 winter transfer window.

=== Colchester United ===
On 3 February 2025, Lisbie transferred to League Two club Colchester United and signed a 2 1/2-year contract for an undisclosed fee. As a result of "competition for places", Lisbie began his spell in the club's U21 team and then joined Enterprise National League South club Braintree Town on loan until the end of the 2024–25 season. After scoring two goals in seven appearances, he was recalled by Colchester United on 8 April. Lisbie then made four appearances during the final three weeks of the 2024–25 season. He made 51 appearances and scored 11 goals during a mid-table 2025–26 season and departed the club in June 2026.

=== Reading ===
On 22 June 2026, Lisbie transferred to League One club Reading and signed a four-year contract for an undisclosed fee.

Lisbie was allocated the squad number 19 for the 2026/27 season and quickly established himself on the right side of the attack.

== Representative career ==
While with Shield Academy, Lisbie represented Essex at U16 level.

== Personal life ==
Lisbie is the son of former professional footballer and Charlton Athletic striker Kevin Lisbie and his twin brother Kyrell also became a footballer. Lisbie is of Jamaican descent, grew up in Chigwell, Essex and is a Christian.

== Career statistics ==
As of match played 24 October 2026

Appearances and goals by club, season and competition
Club	Season	League			National cup (Note: Includes FA Cup)		League cup (Note: Includes EFL Cup, National League Cup)		Other		Total	
Club	Season	Division	Apps	Goals	Apps	Goals	Apps	Goals	Apps	Goals	Apps	Goals
Cray Valley Paper Mills	2020–21	Isthmian League South East Division	1	0	0	0	―		1 (Note: Appearance in London Senior Cup)	0	2	0
Colchester United	2024–25	League Two	4	0	―		―		―		4	0
Colchester United	2025–26	League Two	45	11	1	0	1	0	4 (Note: Appearances in EFL Trophy)	0	51	11
Colchester United	Total		49	11	1	0	1	0	4	0	55	11
Braintree Town (loan)	2024–25	National League	5	1	―		2	1	―		7	2
Reading	2026–27	League One	12	5	0	0	3	0	0	0	15	5
Career total			67	17	1	0	6	1	5	0	79	18

== Honours ==
Brentford B

- Premier League Cup: 2022–23
