= Ezio Touray =

Italian-Ghanaian footballer (born 2004)

Personal information
- Date of birth: 9 January 2004 (age 22)
- Place of birth: Italy
- Height: 1.94 m (6 ft 4 in)
- Position: Forward

Team information
- Current team: Poole Town
- Number: 9

Youth career
- ChievoVerona
- Reading

Senior career*
Years	Team	Apps	(Gls)
2021	Flackwell Heath		
2021–2022	Reading City	10	
2022–2023	Basingstoke Town	11	(7)
2023	Watford	0	(0)
2023	→ Maidstone United (loan)	2	(0)
2023–2024	Weymouth	46	(10)
2024–2025	Poole Town	28	(12)
2025-2026	Chippenham Town	38	(3)
2026-	Poole Town	16	(7)
- * Club domestic league appearances and goals as of 00:53, 17th November 2026 (UTC)

Ezio Touray (born 9 January 2004) is an Italian footballer who plays as a forward for Southern Premier Division club Poole Town F.C.

== Club career ==
Born in Italy, Touray began his footballing career in the academy of professional side ChievoVerona. He moved to England as a teenager, and enrolled at the John Madejski Academy. He also spent time with Reading, playing in the under-18 Premier League Cup.

At the age of seventeen, he made his debut for non-league side Flackwell Heath, before moving on to Reading City later in the same year, where he made ten appearances. After a good start to his career, Reading City manager Simon Johnson recommended him to Isthmian League side Basingstoke Town, and he signed in summer 2022. Though he was on non-contract terms with Basingstoke, he settled well at his new club, scoring on his debut against Hanworth Villa.

His performances continued to impress, and after being linked with a number of National League sides, as well as an ultimately unsuccessful trial with an unnamed EFL League One side, he was invited by EFL Championship side Watford on trial in November 2022. Having impressed, Watford requested that he remain on trial until the end of December, with a view to sign him in the January transfer window.

Touray signed for Watford on 13 January 2023, following thirteen goals in fifteen appearances for Basingstoke Town. Basingstoke manager Dan Brownlie said of the deal: "It's bittersweet. We’re absolutely gutted to lose him, there’s no doubt about that. However, we are genuinely over the moon for the lad and the opportunity that now lays in front of him." Touray was assigned to Watford's under-21 side, but would also train with the first team during his time at the club.

In March 2023, Touray was loaned to National League side Maidstone United on a short-term deal. Following two appearances for the club, he returned to Watford, where he was released at the conclusion of the 2022–23 season.

On September 9, 2023, Touray signed for National League South side Weymouth.

Touray signed for Southern Premier League side Poole Town midway through the 2024/2025 season, scoring 12 goals in 28 games before leaving the club at the end of that season.

Following a difficult spell at Chippenham Town during the 2025/26 season Touray returned to Poole Town for the 2026/27 season. He now wears the number 9 shirt replacing Poole Town legend Shaquille Gwengwe. After a rocky start to the campaign, Ezio managed to pick up form scoring 5 goals in 11 league games including a goal against his former club Chippenham Town.

== Career statistics ==
As of match played 23 November 2024

Appearances and goals by club, season and competition
Club	Season	League			FA Cup		EFL Cup		Other		Total	
Club	Season	Division	Apps	Goals	Apps	Goals	Apps	Goals	Apps	Goals	Apps	Goals
Basingstoke Town	2022–23	Isthmian League; South Central Division	11	7	1	2	—		3 (Note: One appearance and three goals in FA Trophy qualification, one appearance in the Alan Turvey Trophy and one appearance and one goal unknown)	4	15	13
Watford	2022–23	Championship	0	0	—		—		—		0	0
Maidstone United (loan)	2022–23	National League	2	0	—		—		—		2	0
Weymouth	2023–24	National League South	33	9	2	2	—		2 (Note: Appearances in FA Trophy)	2	37	13
Weymouth	2024–25	National League South	13	1	4	2	—		1 (Note: Appearance in Dorset Senior Cup)	1	18	4
Weymouth	Total		46	10	6	4	—		3	3	55	17
Poole Town	2024–25	Southern League; Premier Division South	3	2	—		—		—		3	2
Career total			62	19	7	6	0	0	6	7	75	32
