= Mauro Bandeira =

Portuguese footballer (born 2003)

Personal information
- Full name: Mauro Gomes Bandeira
- Date of birth: 18 November 2003 (age 22)
- Place of birth: Loures, Portugal
- Height: 1.78 m (5 ft 10 in)
- Position: Midfielder

Youth career
- Barnet
- –2018: Queens Park Rangers
- 2018–2022: Arsenal

Senior career*
| Years | Team | Apps | (Gls) |
| 2022–2024 | Arsenal | 0 | (0) |
| 2023–2024 | → Colchester United (loan) | 9 | (0) |
| 2024–2025 | Tabor Sežana | 5 | (1) |
- * Club domestic league appearances and goals as of 15 October 2026

Mauro Gomes Bandeira (born 18 November 2003) is a Portuguese footballer who plays as a midfielder.

== Club career ==
After playing in the Barnet and Queens Park Rangers (QPR) academies, Bandeira joined the Arsenal Academy from QPR in 2018. He signed his first professional contract with the club in the summer of 2022. During the 2022–23 season he played for Arsenal in the EFL Trophy. He also made the first-team match day squad for Arsenal, appearing as an unused substitute in the UEFA Europa League.

In July 2023, Bandeira joined Colchester United on a season-long loan. He was named in the starting XI to make his senior debut on 5 August 2023 against Swindon Town in EFL League Two, however the match was abandoned due to a waterlogged pitch. In January 2024, he was recalled from his loan spell by Arsenal after making 11 appearances in all competitions for Colchester.

Bandeira was released by Arsenal at the end of the 2023–24 season following the expiration of his contract after which he signed for Slovenian side NK Tabor Sežana.

He joined Slovenian club Tabor Sežana for the 2024–25 season, but left at the end of the season.

== International career ==
Born in Portugal to Angolan parents, Bandeira moved to England at a young age and holds dual Portuguese-British citizenship. He was called up to training camps for the Portugal U19s.

== Personal life ==
Bandeira is a martial arts enthusiast.

== Career statistics ==
=== Club ===
As of match played 14 October 2023

Appearances and goals by club, season and competition
| Club | Season | League | | | National cup | | League cup | | Other | | Total | |
| Club | Season | Division | Apps | Goals | Apps | Goals | Apps | Goals | Apps | Goals | Apps | Goals |
|---|---|---|---|---|---|---|---|---|---|---|---|---|
| Arsenal U21 | 2022–23 | — | — | | — | | — | | 3 (Note: Appearances in EFL Trophy) | 0 | 3 | 0 |
| Arsenal | 2022–23 | Premier League | 0 | 0 | 0 | 0 | 0 | 0 | — | | 0 | 0 |
| Colchester United (loan) | 2023–24 | League Two | 9 | 0 | 0 | 0 | 1 | 0 | 1 | 0 | 11 | 0 |
| Career total | | | 9 | 0 | 0 | 0 | 1 | 0 | 4 | 0 | 14 | 0 |
