= Angel Waruih =

Footballer (born 2003)

Personal information
- Full name: Angel Michael Mathaiya Waruih
- Date of birth: 9 December 2003 (age 22)
- Place of birth: Botswana
- Height: 1.75 m (5 ft 9 in)
- Position: Central midfielder

Team information
- Current team: Hampton & Richmond Borough

Youth career
- 2009–2022: Plymouth Argyle
- 2022–2024: Brentford

Senior career*
Years	Team	Apps	(Gls)
2024–2026	Eastleigh	75	(0)
2026–	Hampton & Richmond Borough	1	(0)
- * Club domestic league appearances and goals as of 23:18, 16 September 2026 (UTC)

Angel Michael Mathaiya Waruih (born 9 December 2003) is a professional footballer who plays as a central midfielder for National League South club Hampton & Richmond Borough.

Waruih is a product of the Plymouth Argyle academy and he began his professional career with Brentford in 2022. Following two seasons of B team football, Waruih began his senior career in non-League football.

== Career ==
=== Plymouth Argyle ===
Waruih began his career in Plymouth Argyle's Advanced Development Centre at the age of five, before joining the club's academy at age 9. Initially a forward, he was moved to the wing, wing back and then central midfield. Waruih progressed through the academy and was a part of the club's 2018 SuperCupNI Super Vase-winning team. He signed a two-year scholarship deal at the end of the 2019–20 season and was a part of the U18 team which won the 2020–21 EFL Youth Alliance Merit League One title. Waruih won calls into two EFL Trophy squads during the 2021–22 season and made his only senior appearance for the club with a start in a 2–0 group stage defeat to Newport County on 31 August 2021. He was released at the end of the 2021–22 season.

=== Brentford ===
Following a successful trial, Waruih transferred to the B team at Premier League club Brentford on 24 August 2022 and signed a one-year contract, with a one year option. He made six appearances during the B team's 2022–23 Premier League Cup-winning campaign. The one-year option to extend Waruih's contract was exercised at the end of the 2022–23 season, with a further one-year option attached. He was released at the end of the 2023–24 season.

=== Non-League football ===
On 25 June 2024, Waruih transferred to National League club Eastleigh and signed a one-year contract, with a one-year option, effective 1 July 2024. Waruih made 84 appearances over the course of two mid-table seasons and was released when his contract expired at the end of the 2025–26 season. His 2024–25 performances were recognised with the club's Young Player of the Year award. On 12 September 2026, Waruih signed an undisclosed-length contract with National League South club Hampton & Richmond Borough.

== Style of play ==
Waruih is a deep-lying midfielder and "has the capability to push further forward and play as a number eight too".

== Personal life ==
Waruih is of Botswanan descent. He attended St Boniface's Catholic College.

== Career statistics ==
As of match played 12 September 2026

Appearances and goals by club, season and competition
Club	Season	League			FA Cup		EFL Cup		Other		Total	
Club	Season	Division	Apps	Goals	Apps	Goals	Apps	Goals	Apps	Goals	Apps	Goals
Plymouth Argyle	2021–22	League One	0	0	0	0	0	0	1 (Note: Appearance in EFL Trophy)	0	1	0
Eastleigh	2024–25	National League	43	0	1	0	―		2 (Note: Appearances in FA Trophy)	0	46	0
Eastleigh	2025–26	National League	32	0	2	0	―		4 (Note: 2 appearances in FA Trophy, 2 appearances in Hampshire Senior Cup)	0	38	0
Eastleigh	Total		75	0	3	0	―		6	0	84	0
Hampton & Richmond Borough	2026–27	National League South	1	0	0	0	―		0	0	1	0
Career total			76	0	3	0	0	0	7	0	86	0

== Honours ==
Brentford B

- Premier League Cup: 2022–23

Individual

- Eastleigh Young Player of the Year: 2024–25
