= Harry Leeson =

Welsh footballer

Personal information
- Full name: Harry Richard Leeson
- Date of birth: 2 September 2003 (age 23)
- Position: Defender

Team information
- Current team: Bristol City

Youth career
- –2023: Bristol City

Senior career*
Years	Team	Apps	(Gls)
2023–2024	Bristol City	0	(0)
2023–	→ Gloucester City (loan)	15	(0)
2024-	Bishop's Cleeve		

International career
2021	Wales U18	1	(0)
- * Club domestic league appearances and goals as of 00:15, 3 April 2024 (UTC)

Harry Richard Leeson (born 2 September 2003) is a Welsh footballer who plays for Bishop's Cleeve as a defender. He is a former youth international for Wales.

== Club career ==
Leeson joined the Bristol City academy at under-nine level. he joined the under-18s on a scholarship in August 2020. Primarily used as a right-back for the youth sides, Gleeson was a second year scholar in the academy when he signed his first professional contract with the club, agreeing to a three-year contract in August 2021. Leeson has also been used as a wide right attacking outlet for Bristol City youth sides.

In July 2023, Leeson was included in the Bristol City first-team squad on a pre-season training camp in Austria. He joined Gloucester City in October 2023 on a short-term loan. He was released by Bristol City at the end of the 2023–24 season. He played for Bishop's Cleeve from 2024 into the 2025–26 season.

== International career ==
On 29 March 2021, Leeson represented Wales U18 against England U18. In August 2021 he was called up to the Wales U19 squad. In May 2023, he was called up to the Wales U-21 team.
