= Jeremy Witten =

Jeremy Witten may refer to:

- Jeremy Witten (baseball), American baseball player
- Jeremy Witten (musician), lead singer of Canadian band Baby Jey

== See also ==
- Jeremy Litten, English rugby footballer
- Jeremy Wisten, Malawian-English footballer
