= Stratford Town F.C. =

Association football club from Stratford-upon-Avon, England

Coordinates: 52°11′39″N 1°40′35″W

Stratford Town
- Full name: Stratford Town Football Club
- Nickname: The Bards
- Founded: 1941 (as Stratford Rangers)
- Ground: The Arden Garages Stadium, Knights Lane, Tiddington
- Chairman: Jed McCrory
- Manager: Paul Davis
- League: Southern League Premier Division Central
- 2025–26: Southern League Premier Division Central, 11th of 22
- Website: www.stratfordtownfc.co.uk
Home colours	Away colours

Stratford Town Football Club is a football club representing the town of Stratford upon Avon, Warwickshire, England, but currently based in nearby Tiddington. They are currently members of the Southern League Premier Division Central and play at Knights Lane.

== History ==
The club was formed in 1941 as Stratford Rangers, changing their name in 1949. After playing in various local leagues, they joined the Worcestershire Combination (which later became the Midland Football Combination) in 1954. In 1957, they switched to the Birmingham and District League, which became the West Midlands (Regional) League in 1962, but rejoined the Combination in 1970. In 1975, they took the unusual step of joining the Hellenic League, which does not normally include teams from Warwickshire. After two unsuccessful seasons, they rejoined the Midland Combination once again, where they remained until becoming founder members of the Midland Football Alliance in 1994.

The club entered financial difficulty in 1998 and were reformed to become Stratford Town F.C.

On 20 April 2013, a 1–1 draw with Stourport Swifts sealed the Midland Alliance title and promotion to the Southern Football League for the first time in the club's history, where they initially played in Division One South & West. After two seasons in the Division One South & West, Stratford Town earned promotion to the Premier Division via the play-offs with a 3–2 win against Larkhall Athletic on 4 May 2015. They successfully retained their status the following season.

The 2021–22 season saw The Bards reach the first round proper of the FA Cup for the first time in their history, defeating National League North side Boston United 3–2 in a fourth qualifying round replay after an initial 1–1 draw at the Boston Community Stadium. Stratford were drawn at home to League One side Shrewsbury Town, with the match televised on ITV4. Despite scoring first, they were eventually defeated 5–1 in front of a sell-out 2,800 spectators at Knights Lane.

== Records ==
- Best FA Cup performance: First round, 2021–22
- Best FA Trophy performance: First round, 2018–19, 2023–24, 2025–26
- Best FA Vase performance: Fifth round, 2008–09
- Best FA Amateur Cup performance: Third round, 1962–63

== Stadium ==
Stratford Town moved into the Knights Lane ground, Tiddington in the 2007–08 season. They played their first league match there against Barwell on 16 February 2008, losing 1–0 to a Stuart Spencer goal.

The record attendance is 2,800 for the FA Cup first round match against Shrewsbury Town on 7 November 2021.

== Players ==
=== Current squad ===
As of 30 July 2026

Note: Flags indicate national team as defined under FIFA eligibility rules; some limited exceptions apply. Players may hold more than one non-FIFA nationality.

Pos.	Nation	Player
GK	ENG	Maxx Clutterbuck
GK	ENG	Callum Smith
DF	ENG	Finley Brennan
DF	ENG	Paul McCone
DF	ENG	Dan Vann
DF	ENG	Lewis Wilson
DF	ENG	Alex Worley
MF	ENG	Jack Cund
MF	ENG	Josh Hawker
MF	NIR	Dan Lafferty
MF	ENG	Lewis Ludford-Ison

Pos.	Nation	Player
MF	ENG	Michael McGrath
MF	ENG	Devonn O'Sullivan
MF	BAN	Cuba Mitchell
MF	ENG	Tom Solanke
FW	ENG	Kieron Berry
FW	ENG	Callum Ebanks
FW	ENG	Andre Wright
FW	ENG	Owen James
FW	ENG	Jamie Molyneux
FW	ENG	Tyrell Skeen-Hamilton
FW	ENG	Charlie Williams

The Southern Football League does not use a squad numbering system.

== Management ==
=== Boardroom ===
As of 26 May 2022

Position	Name
Owner	Jed McCrory

=== Managerial history ===
Period	Manager
1993	Alan Campbell
–2005	Lennie Derby
2005–2006	Ian Britton
2006–2007	Dennis Mulholland
2007–2009	Micky Moore
2009–2010	Rod Brown
2010–2012	Morton Titterton
2012–2014	Morton Titterton; Carl Adams
2014–2018	Carl Adams
2018	Darren Byfield
2018–2019	Thomas Baillie
2019	Tommy Wright
2019–2021	Paul Davis
2021–2022	Tim Flowers
2022–2023	Dean Holdsworth; Gavin Hurren
2023-2024	Gavin Hurren

== See also ==
- Stratford Town F.C. players
- Stratford Town F.C. managers
