= 2023–24 Brentford F.C. season =

English football team season

Brentford
2023–24 season
- Owner: Matthew Benham
- Chairman: Cliff Crown
- Head coach: Thomas Frank
- Stadium: Brentford Community Stadium
- Premier League: 16th
- FA Cup: Third round
- EFL Cup: Third round
- Top goalscorer: League: Yoane Wissa (12); All: Yoane Wissa (12)
- Highest home attendance: 17,201
- Lowest home attendance: 16,688
- Average home league attendance: 17,082
Home colours	Away colours	Third colours

The 2023–24 season was the 134th season in the history of Brentford Football Club and their third consecutive season in the Premier League. In addition to the domestic league, the club participated in the FA Cup and the EFL Cup.

== First team squad ==
Players' ages are as of the opening day of the 2023–24 season.

No.	Player	Nationality	Position	Date of birth (age)	Signed from	Signed in	Notes
Goalkeepers
1	Mark Flekken	(Netherlands)	GK	13 June 1993 (aged 30)	SC Freiburg	2023	
21	Thomas Strakosha	(Albania)	GK	19 March 1995 (aged 28)	Lazio	2022	
31	Hákon Valdimarsson	(Iceland)	GK	13 October 2001 (aged 21)	Elfsborg	2024	
40	Ellery Balcombe	(England)	GK	15 October 1999 (aged 23)	Academy	2016	
41	Vincent Angelini	(Scotland)	GK	12 September 2003 (aged 19)	Watford	2023	
—	Matthew Cox	(England)	GK	2 May 2003 (aged 20)	AFC Wimbledon	2021	Loaned to Bristol Rovers
―	David Raya	(Spain)	GK	15 September 1995 (aged 27)	Blackburn Rovers	2019	Loaned to Arsenal
Defenders
2	Aaron Hickey	(Scotland)	RB	10 June 2002 (aged 21)	Bologna	2022	
3	Rico Henry	(Jamaica)	LB	8 July 1997 (aged 26)	Walsall	2016	
4	Charlie Goode	(England)	CB	3 August 1995 (aged 28)	Northampton Town	2020	Loaned to Wigan Athletic
5	Ethan Pinnock	(Jamaica)	CB	29 May 1993 (aged 30)	Barnsley	2019	
12	Sergio Reguilón	(Spain)	LB	16 December 1996 (aged 26)	Tottenham Hotspur	2024	On loan from Tottenham Hotspur
13	Mathias Jørgensen	(Denmark)	CB	23 April 1990 (aged 33)	Fenerbahçe	2021	
16	Ben Mee	(England)	CB	21 September 1989 (aged 33)	Burnley	2022	
20	Kristoffer Ajer	(Norway)	CB / RB	17 April 1998 (aged 25)	Celtic	2021	
22	Nathan Collins	(Republic of Ireland)	CB	30 April 2001 (aged 22)	Wolverhampton Wanderers	2023	
30	Mads Roerslev	(Denmark)	RB	24 June 1999 (aged 24)	Copenhagen	2019	
36	Kim Ji-soo	(South Korea)	CB	24 December 2004 (aged 18)	Seongnam	2023	
42	Val Adedokun	(Republic of Ireland)	LB	14 February 2003 (aged 20)	Dundalk	2021	
43	Benjamin Fredrick	(Nigeria)	RB	28 May 2005 (aged 18)	Simoiben	2023	On loan from Simoiben
50	Benjamin Arthur	(England)	CB	9 October 2005 (aged 17)	Peterborough United	2023	
―	Fin Stevens	(Wales)	RB	10 April 2003 (aged 20)	Worthing	2020	Loaned to Oxford United
Midfielders
6	Christian Nørgaard (c)	(Denmark)	DM	10 March 1994 (aged 29)	Fiorentina	2019	
8	Mathias Jensen	(Denmark)	CM	1 January 1996 (aged 27)	Celta Vigo	2019	
10	Josh Dasilva	(England)	AM	23 October 1998 (aged 24)	Arsenal	2018	
14	Saman Ghoddos	(Iran)	AM	6 September 1993 (aged 29)	Amiens	2021	
15	Frank Onyeka	(Nigeria)	DM	1 January 1998 (aged 25)	Midtjylland	2021	
24	Mikkel Damsgaard	(Denmark)	AM	3 July 2000 (aged 23)	Sampdoria	2022	
25	Myles Peart-Harris	(England)	AM	18 September 2002 (aged 20)	Chelsea	2021	Loaned to Portsmouth
26	Shandon Baptiste	(Grenada)	CM	8 April 1998 (aged 25)	Oxford United	2020	
27	Vitaly Janelt	(Germany)	DM	10 May 1998 (aged 25)	VfL Bochum	2020	
32	Ryan Trevitt	(England)	MF	12 March 2003 (aged 20)	Leatherhead Youth	2021	Loaned to Exeter City
33	Yehor Yarmolyuk	(Ukraine)	CM	1 March 2004 (aged 19)	Dnipro-1	2022	
38	Ethan Brierley	(England)	MF	23 November 2003 (aged 19)	Rochdale	2023	
52	Yunus Emre Konak	(Turkey)	DM	10 January 2006 (aged 17)	Sivasspor	2024	
―	Paris Maghoma	(England)	CM	8 May 2001 (aged 22)	Tottenham Hotspur	2020	Loaned to Bolton Wanderers
Attackers
7	Neal Maupay	(France)	FW	14 August 1996 (aged 26)	Everton	2023	On loan from Everton
9	Kevin Schade	(Germany)	LW / FW	27 November 2001 (aged 21)	SC Freiburg	2023	
11	Yoane Wissa	(Democratic Republic of the Congo)	FW / W	3 September 1996 (aged 26)	Lorient	2021	
17	Ivan Toney	(England)	FW	16 March 1996 (aged 27)	Peterborough United	2020	
19	Bryan Mbeumo	(Cameroon)	RW / FW	7 August 1999 (aged 24)	Troyes	2019	
23	Keane Lewis-Potter	(England)	LW	22 February 2001 (aged 22)	Hull City	2022	
37	Michael Olakigbe	(England)	LW	6 April 2004 (aged 19)	Fulham	2022	Loaned to Peterborough United
Players who left the club mid-season
~~7~~	Sergi Canós	(Spain)	RW	2 February 1997 (aged 26)	Norwich City	2017	Transferred to Valencia
29	Mads Bech Sørensen	(Denmark)	CB	7 January 1999 (aged 24)	AC Horsens	2017	Transferred to Midtjylland

== Transfers ==
=== Transfers in ===
Date	Position	Nationality	Player	From	Fee	Ref.
1 July 2023 (Note: Beckham's transfer was announced on 17 June 2023 and his contract commenced on 1 July 2023.)	FB	(England)	Romeo Beckham	(United States) Inter Miami II	Compensation	
1 July 2023 (Note: Brierley's transfer was announced on 2 June 2023 and his contract commenced on 1 July 2023.)	MF	(England)	Ethan Brierley	(England) Rochdale	Undisclosed	
1 July 2023 (Note: Flekken's transfer was announced on 31 May 2023 and his contract commenced on 1 July 2023.)	GK	(Netherlands)	Mark Flekken	(Germany) SC Freiburg	£11,000,000	
1 July 2023 (Note: Ji-soo's transfer was announced on 26 June 2023 and his contract commenced on 1 July 2023.)	CB	(South Korea)	Kim Ji-soo	(South Korea) Seongnam	Undisclosed	
1 July 2023 (Note: Schade's transfer was announced on 12 June 2023 and his contract commenced on 1 July 2023.)	LW	(Germany)	Kevin Schade	(Germany) SC Freiburg	£22,000,000	
4 July 2023	CB	(Republic of Ireland)	Nathan Collins	(England) Wolverhampton Wanderers	£23,000,000	
5 July 2023	CB	(Albania)	Erion Zabeli	(England) Oxford United	Undisclosed	
28 July 2023	FW	(Scotland)	Ethan Laidlaw	(Scotland) Hibernian	Undisclosed	
16 August 2023	CM	(England)	Riley Owen	(England) Tottenham Hotspur	Free transfer	
25 August 2023	AM	(Iran)	Saman Ghoddos	Free agent	Free transfer	
31 August 2023	CB	(England)	Benjamin Arthur	(England) Peterborough United	Undisclosed	
1 September 2023	FW	(England)	Ashley Hay	(England) Hitchin Town	Undisclosed	
1 September 2023	FW	(Wales)	Iwan Morgan	(Wales) Swansea City	Compensation	
11 January 2024	DM	(Turkey)	Yunus Emre Konak	(Turkey) Sivasspor	£4,000,000	
22 January 2024	MF	(England)	Ben Krauhaus	(England) Bromley	Undisclosed	
26 January 2024	GK	(Iceland)	Hákon Valdimarsson	(Sweden) Elfsborg	£2,600,000	

=== Loans in ===
Date	Position	Nationality	Player	From	Date until	Ref.
31 August 2023	RB	(Nigeria)	Benjamin Fredrick	(Nigeria) Simoiben	End of season	
1 September 2023	FW	(France)	Neal Maupay	(England) Everton	End of season	
17 January 2024	LB	(Spain)	Sergio Reguilón	(England) Tottenham Hotspur	End of season	
1 February 2024	AM	(Uzbekistan)	Mukhammadali Urinboev	(Uzbekistan) Pakhtakor	End of season	

=== Loans out ===
Date	Position	Nationality	Player	To	Date until	Ref.
1 July 2023	RB	(England)	Daniel Oyegoke	(England) Bradford City	End of season	
1 July 2023	RB	(Wales)	Fin Stevens	(England) Oxford United	End of season	
14 July 2023	MF	(England)	Ryan Trevitt	(England) Exeter City	8 January 2024 (Note: Trevitt was recalled from his season-long loan at Exeter City on 8 January 2024.)	
25 July 2023	GK	(England)	Matthew Cox	(England) Bristol Rovers	End of season	
25 July 2023	CB	(France)	Tristan Crama	(England) Bristol Rovers	End of season	
31 July 2023	CM	(England)	Paris Maghoma	(England) Bolton Wanderers	End of season	
1 August 2023	GK	(England)	Ben Winterbottom	(England) Welling United	1 January 2024	
15 August 2023	GK	(Spain)	David Raya	(England) Arsenal	End of season (Note: Under the terms of Raya's loan, Brentford received a £3,000,000 fee.)	
22 January 2024	CB	(England)	Charlie Goode	(England) Wigan Athletic	End of season	
22 January 2024	MF	(England)	Ben Krauhaus	(England) Bromley	End of season	
22 January 2024	AM	(England)	Myles Peart-Harris	(England) Portsmouth	End of season	
30 January 2024	LW	(England)	Michael Olakigbe	(England) Peterborough United	End of season	

=== Transfers out ===
Date	Position	Nationality	Name	To	Fee	Ref.
30 June 2023	W	(England)	J'Neil Bennett	Free agent	Released	
30 June 2023	W	(Australia)	Lachlan Brook	(Australia) Western Sydney Wanderers	Released	
30 June 2023	LW	(Ghana)	Tariqe Fosu	Free agent	Released	
30 June 2023	AM	(Iran)	Saman Ghoddos	Free agent	Released	
30 June 2023	AM	(Republic of Ireland)	Alex Gilbert	(England) Middlesbrough	Compensation	
30 June 2023	CB	(Sweden)	Pontus Jansson	(Sweden) Malmo	Released	
30 June 2023	CB	(Republic of Ireland)	Nico Jones	(England) Welling United	Released	
30 June 2023	GK	(England)	Roco Rees	(England) Worthing	Released	
30 June 2023	DM	(Albania)	Roy Syla	(Scotland) Ayr United	Released	
30 June 2023	W	(Ecuador)	Joel Valencia	(Poland) Zagłębie Sosnowiec	Released	
30 June 2023	FW	(England)	Lucias Vine	(England) Gosport Borough	Released	
16 July 2023	FW	(Turkey)	Halil Dervişoğlu	(Turkey) Galatasaray	€500,000	
17 July 2023	MF	(Denmark)	Mads Bidstrup	(Austria) Red Bull Salzburg	Undisclosed	
2 August 2023	FW	(Scotland)	Aaron Pressley	(England) Stevenage	Compensation	
20 August 2023	RW	(Spain)	Sergi Canós	(Spain) Valencia	Undisclosed	
1 September 2023	CB	(Denmark)	Mads Bech Sørensen	(Denmark) Midtjylland	Undisclosed	

== Pre-season and friendlies ==
Win Draw Loss Fixtures

12 July 2023 Friendly	Boreham Wood	1–1	Brentford	Borehamwood
19:30 BST	Abraham 67'	Report	Dervişoğlu 18'	Stadium: Meadow Park; Attendance: 1,364; Referee: David Rock

23 July 2023 Premier League Summer Series	Fulham	3–2	Brentford	Philadelphia, United States
16:00 EDT	Wilson 3', (yellow card) 32'; Decordova-Reid 36'; Carlos Vinícius 47'; Reed (yellow card) 61'; Willian (yellow card) 90+5'	Report	Wissa 7'; Ajer 48'; Jørgensen (yellow card) 61'	Stadium: Lincoln Financial Field; Attendance: 40,332; Referee: Peter Bankes

26 July 2023 Premier League Summer Series	Brentford	0–2	Brighton & Hove Albion	Atlanta, United States
17:30 EDT	Onyeka (yellow card) 31'; Jørgensen (yellow card) 41'	Report	Adingra 19', 58'	Stadium: Mercedes-Benz Stadium; Attendance: 40,000; Referee: Guido Gonzales, Jr. (United States)

30 July 2023 Premier League Summer Series	Aston Villa	3–3	Brentford	Landover, United States
12:00 EDT	Konsa (yellow card) 8', (goal) 27'; Diaby 32'; Cash 37'; Douglas Luiz (yellow card) 88'	Report	Mbeumo 9' (pen.); Dasilva 22'; Baptiste 66'	Stadium: FedEx Field; Attendance: 46,346; Referee: Peter Bankes

5 August 2023 Friendly	Brentford XI	5–1	Lille XI	Osterley
	Schade 7'; Nørgaard; Olakigbe (pen.)	Report	Virginius	Stadium: Jersey Road; Attendance: 0

5 August 2023 Friendly	Brentford	0–0	Lille	Brentford
16:00 BST		Report		Stadium: Brentford Community Stadium; Referee: Michael Salisbury

14 August 2023 Friendly	Brentford XI	4–1	Brighton & Hove Albion U21	Osterley
	Schade 12'; 76' (o.g.)	Report	Trialist	Stadium: Jersey Road; Attendance: 0

22 August 2023 Friendly	Brentford	1–2	Southampton	Brentford
	Onyeka	Report	Dibling; Doyle	Stadium: Brentford Community Stadium; Attendance: 0

18 November 2023 Friendly	Brentford	6–8	Watford	Osterley
	Toney (pen.); Maupay; Brierley	Report	Bayo; Louza; Healey	Stadium: Jersey Road; Attendance: 0

28 November 2023 Friendly	Bournemouth XI	3–1	Brentford XI	Boscombe
	Traorè; Brooks; Moore	Report	Peart-Harris (pen.)	Stadium: Dean Court; Attendance: 0

13 January 2024 Friendly	Brentford XI	1–3	Brøndby IF	Brentford
	Toney (pen.)	Report	Suzuki; Nartey	Stadium: Brentford Community Stadium; Attendance: 0 Referee: Craig Pawson

2 April 2024 Friendly	Brentford XI	3–1	Leyton Orient	Osterley
	Trevitt; Schade (pen.)	Report	Pigott (pen.)	Stadium: Jersey Road; Attendance: 0

== Competitions ==
=== Overall record ===
Competition	First match	Last match	Starting round	Final position	Record							
Competition	First match	Last match	Starting round	Final position	Pld	W	D	L	GF	GA	GD	Win %
Premier League	13 August 2023	19 May 2024	Matchday 1	16th	38	10	9	19	56	65	−9	26.32
FA Cup	5 January 2024	16 January 2024	Third round	Third round	2	0	1	1	3	4	−1	0.00
EFL Cup	29 August 2023	27 September 2023	Second round	Third round	2	0	1	1	1	2	−1	0.00
Total					42	10	11	21	60	71	−11	23.81

Source: Soccerway

=== Premier League ===
==== League table ====
Pos	Team	Pld	W	D	L	GF	GA	GD	Pts	Qualification or relegation
14	Wolverhampton Wanderers	38	13	7	18	50	65	−15	46	
15	Everton	38	13	9	16	40	51	−11	40 (Note: Everton were deducted eight points for breaching profitability and sustainability rules. They were originally deducted ten points but this was reduced to six after an appeal. The club were then deducted an additional two points for further PSR breaches.)	
16	Brentford	38	10	9	19	56	65	−9	39	
17	Nottingham Forest	38	9	9	20	49	67	−18	32 (Note: Nottingham Forest were deducted four points for breaching profitability and sustainability rules. The club appealed the decision but were unsuccessful.)	
18	Luton Town (R)	38	6	8	24	52	85	−33	26	Relegation to EFL Championship

Source: Premier League
Rules for classification: 1) Points; 2) Goal difference; 3) Goals scored; 4) If the champions, relegated teams or qualified teams for UEFA competitions cannot be determined by rules 1 to 3, rules 4.1 to 4.3 are applied – 4.1) Points gained in head-to-head record between such teams; 4.2) Away goals scored in head-to-head record between such teams; 4.3) Play-offs
(R) Relegated

==== Results summary ====
Overall								Home						Away					
Pld	W	D	L	GF	GA	GD	Pts	W	D	L	GF	GA	GD	W	D	L	GF	GA	GD
38	10	9	19	56	65	−9	39	5	7	7	29	34	−5	5	2	12	27	31	−4

Source: Soccerway

==== Results by round ====
Round	1	2	3	4	5	6	7	8	9	10	11	12	13	14	15	16	17	19	20	21	22	23	24	25	18^{1}	26	27	28	29	30	31	32	33	34	35	36	37	38
Ground	H	A	H	H	A	H	A	A	H	A	H	A	H	H	A	A	H	H	A	H	A	H	A	H	A	A	H	A	A	H	H	A	H	A	A	H	A	H
Result	D	W	D	D	L	L	D	L	W	W	W	L	L	W	L	L	L	L	L	W	L	L	W	L	L	L	D	L	L	D	D	D	W	W	L	D	W	L
Position	8	4	9	8	11	13	14	15	14	10	9	11	11	11	11	11	12	14	16	14	14	15	15	14	14	16	15	15	15	15	15	15^{2}	15	15	16	16	16	16
Points	1	4	5	6	6	6	7	7	10	13	16	16	16	19	19	19	19	19	19	22	22	22	25	25	25	25	26	26	26	27	28	29	32	35	35	36	39	39

Source: Soccerway
A = Away; H = Home; W = Win; D = Draw; L = Loss; P = Postponed
- ^{1} Matchday 18 (vs Manchester City) was postponed to 20 February 2024 due to Manchester City's participation in the 2023 FIFA Club World Cup.
- ^{2} Brentford were originally 16th at the end of Matchday 32. On 8 April 2024, Everton were deducted 2 points, subsequently bringing Brentford up to 15th.

==== Matches ====
Win Draw Loss Fixtures

13 August 2023 1	Brentford	2–2	Tottenham Hotspur	Brentford
14:00 BST	Mbeumo 27' (pen.); Wissa 36'; Hickey (yellow card) 62'	Report	Romero 11'; Vicario (yellow card) 26'; Sánchez (yellow card) 36'; Maddison (yellow card) 36'; Skipp (yellow card) 44'; Emerson 45+4'	Stadium: Brentford Community Stadium; Attendance: 17,066; Referee: Robert Jones

19 August 2023 2	Fulham	0–3	Brentford	Fulham
15:00 BST	Ream (yellow card) 45+3' (yellow-red card) 64'; Reed (yellow card) 64'; Palhinha (yellow card) 85'	Report	Hickey (yellow card) 40'; Wissa 44'; Henry (yellow card) 61'; Mbeumo 66' (pen.), 90+2'	Stadium: Craven Cottage; Attendance: 24,236; Referee: Darren Bond

26 August 2023 3	Brentford	1–1	Crystal Palace	Brentford
15:00 BST	Schade 18'	Report	Andersen 76'	Stadium: Brentford Community Stadium; Attendance: 16,997; Referee: Peter Bankes

2 September 2023 4	Brentford	2–2	Bournemouth	Brentford
15:00 BST	Jensen 7', (yellow card) 69'; Mbeumo 90+3'	Report	Solanke 30'; Aarons (yellow card) 51'; Neto (yellow card) 64'; Brooks 77'	Stadium: Brentford Community Stadium; Attendance: 16,973; Referee: Bobby Madley

16 September 2023 5	Newcastle United	1–0	Brentford	Newcastle upon Tyne
17:30 BST	Wilson 64' (pen.), (yellow card) 90+5'; Gordon (yellow card) 90+5'; Bruno Guimarães (yellow card) 90+7'	Report	Wissa (yellow card) 33'; Nørgaard (yellow card) 42'; Hickey (yellow card) 59'; Flekken (yellow card) 64'; Collins (yellow card) 85'	Stadium: St James' Park; Attendance: 51,670; Referee: Craig Pawson
Note: The match was rescheduled from 16:30 BST on 17 September, following the scheduling of the UEFA Champions League group stage fixtures.

23 September 2023 6	Brentford	1–3	Everton	Brentford
17:30 BST	Jensen 28'; Mbeumo (yellow card) 77'; Ghoddos (yellow card) 82'	Report	Young (yellow card) 1'; Doucouré 6'; Tarkowski 67'; Calvert-Lewin 71'; Branthwaite (yellow card) 90+1'	Stadium: Brentford Community Stadium; Attendance: 16,981; Referee: Michael Oliver

1 October 2023 7	Nottingham Forest	1–1	Brentford	West Bridgford
14:00 BST	Niakhaté (yellow card) 30' (yellow-red card) 56'; Domínguez 65'; Sangaré (yellow card) 68'	Report	Hickey (yellow card) 2'; Nørgaard 58'; Onyeka (yellow card) 88'	Stadium: City Ground; Attendance: 29,004; Referee: Paul Tierney

7 October 2023 8	Manchester United	2–1	Brentford	Trafford
15:00 BST	McTominay 90+3', 90+7'	Report	Hickey (yellow card) 10'; Jensen 26'; Nørgaard (yellow card) 48'; Collins (yellow card) 65'; Janelt (yellow card) 67'; Maupay (yellow card) 79'	Stadium: Old Trafford; Attendance: 73,453; Referee: Andrew Madley

21 October 2023 9	Brentford	3–0	Burnley	Brentford
15:00 BST	Wissa 25'; Ajer (yellow card) 46'; Onyeka (yellow card) 53'; Mbeumo 62'; Jensen (yellow card) 69'; Janelt (yellow card) 85'; Ghoddos 87', (yellow card) 90+3'	Report	Berge (yellow card) 32'; Roberts (yellow card) 42' (yellow-red card) 78'; Cullen (yellow card) 45+2'	Stadium: Brentford Community Stadium; Attendance: 17,029; Referee: Josh Smith

28 October 2023 10	Chelsea	0–2	Brentford	Fulham
12:30 BST	Caicedo (yellow card) 78'	Report	Maupay (yellow card) 56'; Pinnock 58'; Onyeka (yellow card) 85'; Ghoddos (yellow card) 90+5'; Mbeumo 90+6'; Nørgaard (yellow card) 90+6'	Stadium: Stamford Bridge; Attendance: 39,575; Referee: Simon Hooper

4 November 2023 11	Brentford	3–2	West Ham United	Brentford
15:00 GMT	Maupay 11'; Ajer (yellow card) 24'; Mavropanos 55' (o.g.); Collins 69'	Report	Emerson (yellow card) 12'; Kudus 19'; Bowen 26'; Souček (yellow card) 52'; Mavropanos (yellow card) 62'; Ings (yellow card) 90+5'	Stadium: Brentford Community Stadium; Attendance: 17,103; Referee: Thomas Bramall

12 November 2023 12	Liverpool	3–0	Brentford	Liverpool
14:00 GMT	Matip (yellow card) 37'; Salah 39', 62'; Jota 74'	Report	Nørgaard (yellow card) 30'; Ajer (yellow card) 30'	Stadium: Anfield; Attendance: 50,151; Referee: Paul Tierney

25 November 2023 13	Brentford	0–1	Arsenal	Brentford
17:30 GMT	Ajer (yellow card) 45+1'	Report	Martinelli (yellow card) 56'; Havertz 89'	Stadium: Brentford Community Stadium; Attendance: 17,201; Referee: Tim Robinson

2 December 2023 14	Brentford	3–1	Luton Town	Brentford
15:00 GMT	Maupay 49'; Mee 56'; Baptiste 81'; Nørgaard (yellow card) 81'	Report	Kaminski (yellow card) 38'; Chong (yellow card) 50'; Brown 76'	Stadium: Brentford Community Stadium; Attendance: 17,075; Referee: Anthony Taylor

6 December 2023 15	Brighton & Hove Albion	2–1	Brentford	Falmer
19:30 GMT	Van Hecke (yellow card) 25'; Groß 31'; Buonanotte (yellow card) 45+7'; Hinshelwood 52'; Gilmour (yellow card) 77'	Report	Mbeumo 27' (pen.); Wissa (yellow card) 76'	Stadium: Falmer Stadium; Attendance: 30,760; Referee: Peter Bankes

9 December 2023 16	Sheffield United	1–0	Brentford	Sheffield
15:00 BST	Trusty (yellow card) 17'; McAtee 45+1'; Osula (yellow card) 51'; Bogle (yellow card) 82'; Robinson (yellow card) 90+1'; Foderingham (yellow card) 90+2'	Report	Onyeka (yellow card) 29'	Stadium: Bramall Lane; Attendance: 28,509; Referee: Stuart Attwell

17 December 2023 17	Brentford	1–2	Aston Villa	Brentford
14:00 GMT	Lewis-Potter 45'; Nørgaard (yellow card) 46'; Mee (red card) 71'; Ghoddos (yellow card) 86'; Janelt (yellow card) 88'; Onyeka (yellow card) 90'; Maupay (yellow card) 90+1'; Yarmolyuk (yellow card) 90+8'	Report	Moreno 77'; Bailey (yellow card) 80'; Watkins 85'; Konsa (yellow card) 86'; Durán (yellow card) 87'; Kamara (red card) 90+7'; Martínez (yellow card) 90+8'	Stadium: Brentford Community Stadium; Attendance: 17,034; Referee: David Coote

27 December 2023 19	Brentford	1–4	Wolverhampton Wanderers	Brentford
19:30 GMT	Wissa 16'; Nørgaard (yellow card) 43'	Report	Lemina 13'; Hwang 14', 28'; Kilman (yellow card) 54'; Bellegarde 79'	Stadium: Brentford Community Stadium; Attendance: 17,109; Referee: Andrew Madley

30 December 2023 20	Crystal Palace	3–1	Brentford	Selhurst
15:00 GMT	Olise 14', 58'; Eze 39'	Report	Lewis-Potter 2'; Ghoddos (yellow card) 45+2'	Stadium: Selhurst Park; Attendance: 25,472; Referee: Robert Jones

20 January 2024 21	Brentford	3–2	Nottingham Forest	Brentford
17:30 GMT	Toney 19', (yellow card) 66'; Mee 58'; Maupay 68'	Report	Danilo 3', (yellow card) 51'; Mangala (yellow card) 18'; Montiel (yellow card) 54'; Wood 66'	Stadium: Brentford Community Stadium; Attendance: 17,077; Referee: Darren England

31 January 2024 22	Tottenham Hotspur	3–2	Brentford	Tottenham
19:30 GMT	Kulusevski (yellow card) 43'; Udogie 48'; Johnson 49'; Richarlison 56'; Donley (yellow card) 90+6'	Report	Maupay 15', (yellow card) 43'; Nørgaard (yellow card) 17'; Toney 67'; Yarmolyuk (yellow card) 90'	Stadium: Tottenham Hotspur Stadium; Attendance: 61,210; Referee: David Coote
Note: The match was originally scheduled for 30 January 2024, but was moved for TV coverage.

5 February 2024 23	Brentford	1–3	Manchester City	Brentford
20:00 GMT	Maupay 21', (yellow card) 31'	Report	Foden 45+3', 53', 70'	Stadium: Brentford Community Stadium; Attendance: 17,096; Referee: Jarred Gillett

10 February 2024 24	Wolverhampton Wanderers	0–2	Brentford	Wolverhampton
15:00 GMT	Fraser (yellow card) 70'; Lemina (yellow card) 88'	Report	Nørgaard 35'; Flekken (yellow card) 60'; Jensen (yellow card) 68'; Toney 77'; Janelt (yellow card) 81'	Stadium: Molineux Stadium; Attendance: 30,731; Referee: Simon Hooper

17 February 2024 25	Brentford	1–4	Liverpool	Brentford
12:30 GMT	Reguilón (yellow card) 45'; Onyeka (yellow card) 72'; Toney 75'	Report	Núñez 35'; Mac Allister 55'; Endo (yellow card) 67'; Salah 68'; Gakpo 86'	Stadium: Brentford Community Stadium; Attendance: 17,193; Referee: Michael Oliver

20 February 2024 18	Manchester City	1–0	Brentford	Manchester
19:30 GMT	Stones (yellow card) 45+2'; Haaland 71'; Walker (yellow card) 82'	Report	Mee (yellow card) 45+2'; Wissa (yellow card) 60'; Toney (yellow card) 68'; Flekken (yellow card) 90+6'	Stadium: City of Manchester Stadium; Attendance: 52,137; Referee: Darren England
Note: The match was postponed due to Manchester City's participation in the FIFA Club World Cup.

26 February 2024 26	West Ham United	4–2	Brentford	Stratford
20:00 GMT	Bowen 5', 7', 63'; Emerson 69'; Álvarez (yellow card) 89'	Report	Maypay 13'; Reguilón (yellow card) 23'; Jørgensen (yellow card) 52'; Wissa 82'	Stadium: London Stadium; Attendance: 62,450; Referee: Simon Hooper

2 March 2024 27	Brentford	2–2	Chelsea	Brentford
15:00 GMT	Roerslev 50'; Janelt (yellow card) 57'; Wissa 69'; Onyeka (yellow card) 73'; Jørgensen (yellow card) 90+1'	Report	Jackson 35'; Gallagher (yellow card) 38'; Disasi 83'	Stadium: Brentford Community Stadium; Attendance: 17,140; Referee: Jarred Gillett

9 March 2024 28	Arsenal	2–1	Brentford	Holloway
17:30 GMT	Gabriel (yellow card) 10'; Rice 19'; Havertz (yellow card) 45+2', (goal) 86'	Report	Onyeka (yellow card) 4'; Jørgensen (yellow card) 21'; Wissa 45+4', (yellow card) 72'; Collins (yellow card) 90+9'	Stadium: Emirates Stadium; Attendance: 60,331; Referee: Robert Jones
Note: Fixture was originally scheduled for a 15:00 kick-off, but was pushed back for live Sky Sports coverage.

16 March 2024 29	Burnley	2–1	Brentford	Burnley
15:00 GMT	Bruun Larsen 10' (pen.); Fofana 62'; Amdouni (yellow card) 81'; Taylor (yellow card) 90+1'	Report	Reguilón (red card) 8'; Janelt (yellow card) 68'; Ajer 83', (yellow card) 84'; Toney (yellow card) 90+10'; Baptiste (yellow card) 90+13'	Stadium: Turf Moor; Attendance: 20,431; Referee: Darren Bond

30 March 2024 30	Brentford	1–1	Manchester United	Brentford
20:00 GMT	Wissa (yellow card) 45'; Jørgensen (yellow card) 83'; Ajer 90+9'; Maupay (yellow card) 90+12'	Report	Wan-Bissaka (yellow card) 39'; Mount 90+6'; McTominay (yellow card) 90+12'	Stadium: Brentford Community Stadium; Attendance: 17,138; Referee: Simon Hooper
Note: Fixture was originally scheduled for a 15:00 kick-off, but was pushed back for live Sky Sports coverage.

3 April 2024 31	Brentford	0–0	Brighton & Hove Albion	Brentford
19:30 BST	Janelt (yellow card) 76'	Report	Buonanotte (yellow card) 53'	Stadium: Brentford Community Stadium; Attendance: 17,024; Referee: Andrew Madley
Note: Fixture was initially scheduled for 2 April, but was moved for live TNT Sports broadcast.

6 April 2024 32	Aston Villa	3–3	Brentford	Aston
15:00 BST	Watkins 39', 80'; Rogers 46'; Diego Carlos (yellow card) 84'; Douglas Luiz (yellow card) 90+7'	Report	Damsgaard (yellow card) 42'; Wissa (yellow card) 53', (goal) 68'; Jørgensen 59'; Mbeumo 61'	Stadium: Villa Park; Attendance: 42,218; Referee: Michael Salisbury

13 April 2024 33	Brentford	2–0	Sheffield United	Brentford
15:00 BST	Maupay (yellow card) 7'; Janelt (yellow card) 41'; Arblaster 63' (o.g.); Roerslev (yellow card) 88'; Onyeka 90+3'	Report	Brereton (yellow card) 45'	Stadium: Brentford Community Stadium; Attendance: 17,115; Referee: Sam Barrott

20 April 2024 34	Luton Town	1–5	Brentford	Luton
15:00 BST	Doughty (yellow card) 88'; Berry 90+2'	Report	Wissa 24', 45+1'; Pinnock (yellow card) 38', (goal) 62'; Damsgaard (yellow card) 48'; Lewis-Potter 64'; Schade 86'	Stadium: Kenilworth Road; Attendance: 11,877; Referee: Jarred Gillett

27 April 2024 35	Everton	1–0	Brentford	Liverpool
17:30 GMT	Gueye 60'; Tarkowski (yellow card) 74'	Report	Reguilón (yellow card) 43'; Mbeumo (yellow card) 90+1'	Stadium: Goodison Park; Attendance: 39,098; Referee: Darren England

4 May 2024 36	Brentford	0–0	Fulham	Brentford
15:00 BST	Reguilón (yellow card) 67'	Report	Bassey (yellow card) 89'	Stadium: Brentford Community Stadium; Attendance: 17,090; Referee: Graham Scott

11 May 2024 37	Bournemouth	1–2	Brentford	Bournemouth
15:00 GMT	Senesi (yellow card) 45+1'; Ouattara (yellow card) 56'; Solanke 89'	Report	Jensen (yellow card) 85'; Mbeumo 86'; Wissa 90+5'; Toney (yellow card) 90+8'	Stadium: Dean Court; Attendance: 11,154; Referee: Matt Donohue

19 May 2024 38	Brentford	2–4	Newcastle United	Brentford
16:00 BST	Toney (yellow card) 44'; Jensen (yellow card) 45+5'; Janelt 48'; Wissa (yellow card) 51', (goal) 70'; Maupay (yellow card) 90+5'	Report	Barnes 21'; Joelinton (yellow card) 28'; Murphy 36'; Isak 38'; Burn (yellow card) 53'; Krafth (yellow card) 66'; Bruno Guimarães 77'; Pope (yellow card) 90+5'	Stadium: Brentford Community Stadium; Attendance: 17,124; Referee: Simon Hooper

=== FA Cup ===
Win Draw Loss Fixtures

5 January 2024 Third round	Brentford	1–1	Wolverhampton Wanderers	Brentford
19:15 GMT	Damsgaard (yellow card) 27'; Roerslev (yellow card) 37'; Maupay 41'; Lewis-Potter (yellow card) 90+5'	Report	João Gomes (red card) 9'; Doyle 64'; S. Bueno (yellow card) 81'; Semedo (yellow card) 90+5'	Stadium: Brentford Community Stadium; Attendance: 16,818; Referee: Tony Harrington

16 January 2024 Third round replay	Wolverhampton Wanderers	3–2 (a.e.t.)	Brentford	Wolverhampton
19:30 GMT	Semedo 36'; Fraser 72'; Cunha 105+5' (pen.); Kilman (yellow card) 115'	Report	Collins 13'; Maupay 52'; Peart-Harris (yellow card) 86'	Stadium: Molineux Stadium; Attendance: 24,692; Referee: Andrew Madley

=== EFL Cup ===
Win Draw Loss Fixtures

29 August 2023 Second round	Newport County	1–1 (0–3 p)	Brentford	Newport
19:45 BST	Charsley (yellow card) 6'; Lewis (yellow card) 76'; Payne (yellow card) 90+4'; Rai 90+6'	Report	Jensen 87'	Stadium: Rodney Parade; Attendance: 6,845; Referee: Scott Oldham
	Penalties
	Lewis (penalty missed); Wood (penalty missed); Morris (penalty missed)		(penalty scored) Mbeumo; (penalty scored) Wissa; (penalty scored) Lewis-Potter

27 September 2023 Third round	Brentford	0–1	Arsenal	Brentford
19:45 BST	Wissa (yellow card) 67'; Jørgensen (yellow card) 90+6'	Report	Nelson 8'; White (yellow card) 41'; Nketiah (yellow card) 54'	Stadium: Brentford Community Stadium; Attendance: 16,688; Referee: Darren Bond

== Statistics ==
=== Appearances and goals ===
No.	Pos.	Nat.	Player	League		FA Cup		EFL Cup		Total	
No.	Pos.	Nat.	Player	Apps	Goals	Apps	Goals	Apps	Goals	Apps	Goals
1	GK	(Netherlands)	Mark Flekken	37	0	0	0	1	0	38	0
2	DF	(Scotland)	Aaron Hickey	9	0	0	0	1 (1)	0	10 (1)	0
3	DF	(Jamaica)	Rico Henry	5	0	0	0	0	0	5	0
5	DF	(Jamaica)	Ethan Pinnock	28 (1)	2	1	0	1	0	30 (1)	2
6	MF	(Denmark)	Christian Nørgaard	30 (1)	2	1	0	1	0	32 (1)	2
8	MF	(Denmark)	Mathias Jensen	27 (5)	3	2	0	0 (2)	1	29 (7)	4
9	FW	(Germany)	Kevin Schade	3 (8)	2	0	0	1	0	4 (8)	2
10	MF	(England)	Josh Dasilva	0 (3)	0	2	0	0	0	2 (3)	0
11	FW	(Democratic Republic of the Congo)	Yoane Wissa	29 (5)	12	0	0	1 (1)	0	30 (6)	12
13	DF	(Denmark)	Mathias Jørgensen	12 (2)	1	1 (1)	0	2	0	15 (3)	1
14	MF	(Iran)	Saman Ghoddos	7 (12)	1	0	0	0 (1)	0	7 (13)	1
15	MF	(Nigeria)	Frank Onyeka	11 (15)	1	0	0	2	0	13 (15)	1
16	DF	(England)	Ben Mee	15 (1)	2	1	0	1	0	17 (1)	2
17	FW	(England)	Ivan Toney	16 (1)	4	―		―		16 (1)	4
19	FW	(Cameroon)	Bryan Mbeumo	22 (3)	9	0	0	1 (1)	0	23 (4)	9
20	DF	(Norway)	Kristoffer Ajer	21 (7)	2	1	0	1 (1)	0	23 (8)	2
21	GK	(Albania)	Thomas Strakosha	1 (1)	0	2	0	0	0	3 (1)	0
22	DF	(Republic of Ireland)	Nathan Collins	29 (3)	1	2	1	1	0	32 (3)	2
23	FW	(England)	Keane Lewis-Potter	15 (15)	3	2	0	1 (1)	0	18 (16)	3
24	MF	(Denmark)	Mikkel Damsgaard	7 (16)	0	2	0	0	0	9 (16)	0
25	MF	(England)	Myles Peart-Harris	0 (3)	0	0 (2)	0	0	0	0 (5)	0
26	MF	(Grenada)	Shandon Baptiste	2 (8)	1	0 (2)	0	0	0	2 (10)	1
27	MF	(Germany)	Vitaly Janelt	37 (1)	1	1 (1)	0	2	0	40 (2)	1
30	DF	(Denmark)	Mads Roerslev	22 (12)	1	2	0	2	0	26 (11)	1
33	MF	(Ukraine)	Yehor Yarmolyuk	6 (21)	0	0 (2)	0	1	0	7 (23)	0
37	FW	(England)	Michael Olakigbe	0 (8)	0	0 (2)	0	1 (1)	0	1 (11)	0
38	MF	(England)	Ethan Brierley	0	0	0	0	0 (1)	0	0 (1)	0
40	GK	(England)	Ellery Balcombe	0	0	0	0	1	0	1	0
Players loaned in during the season
7	FW	(France)	Neal Maupay	13 (16)	6	2	2	―		15 (16)	8
12	DF	(Spain)	Sergio Reguilón	14 (2)	0	―		―		14 (2)	0

- Source: Soccerbase

=== Goalscorers ===
No.	Pos.	Nat.	Player	PL	FAC	EFLC	Total
11	FW	(Democratic Republic of the Congo)	Yoane Wissa	12	0	0	12
19	FW	(Cameroon)	Bryan Mbeumo	9	0	0	9
7	FW	(France)	Neal Maupay	6	2	―	8
17	FW	(England)	Ivan Toney	4	―	―	4
8	MF	(Denmark)	Mathias Jensen	3	0	1	4
23	FW	(England)	Keane Lewis-Potter	3	0	0	3
20	DF	(Norway)	Kristoffer Ajer	2	0	0	2
16	DF	(England)	Ben Mee	2	0	0	2
6	MF	(Denmark)	Christian Nørgaard	2	0	0	2
5	DF	(Jamaica)	Ethan Pinnock	2	0	0	2
9	FW	(Germany)	Kevin Schade	2	0	0	2
22	DF	(Republic of Ireland)	Nathan Collins	1	1	0	2
26	MF	(Grenada)	Shandon Baptiste	1	0	0	1
14	MF	(Iran)	Saman Ghoddos	1	0	0	1
27	MF	(Germany)	Vitaly Janelt	1	0	0	1
13	DF	(Denmark)	Mathias Jørgensen	1	0	0	1
15	MF	(Nigeria)	Frank Onyeka	1	0	0	1
30	DF	(Denmark)	Mads Roerslev	1	0	0	1
Opponents				2	0	0	2
Total				53	3	1	57

- Source: Soccerbase, FBREF

=== Discipline ===
No.	Pos.	Nat.	Player	PL		FAC		EFLC		Total		Pts
No.	Pos.	Nat.	Player	Yellow card	Red card	Yellow card	Red card	Yellow card	Red card	Yellow card	Red card	Pts
27	MF	(Germany)	Vitaly Janelt	8	0	0	0	0	0	8	0	8
7	FW	(France)	Neal Maupay	8	0	0	0	―		8	0	8
6	MF	(Denmark)	Christian Nørgaard	8	0	0	0	0	0	8	0	8
15	MF	(Nigeria)	Frank Onyeka	8	0	0	0	0	0	8	0	8
11	FW	(Democratic Republic of the Congo)	Yoane Wissa	7	0	0	0	1	0	8	0	8
12	DF	(Spain)	Sergio Reguilón	4	1	―		―		4	1	7
20	DF	(Norway)	Kristoffer Ajer	5	0	0	0	0	0	5	0	5
14	MF	(Iran)	Saman Ghoddos	5	0	0	0	0	0	5	0	5
2	DF	(Scotland)	Aaron Hickey	5	0	0	0	0	0	5	0	5
8	MF	(Denmark)	Mathias Jensen	5	0	0	0	0	0	5	0	5
17	FW	(England)	Ivan Toney	5	0	―		―		5	0	5
13	DF	(Denmark)	Mathias Jørgensen	4	0	0	0	1	0	5	0	5
16	DF	(England)	Ben Mee	1	1	0	0	0	0	1	1	4
22	DF	(Republic of Ireland)	Nathan Collins	3	0	0	0	0	0	3	0	3
1	GK	(Netherlands)	Mark Flekken	3	0	0	0	0	0	3	0	3
24	MF	(Denmark)	Mikkel Damsgaard	2	0	1	0	0	0	3	0	3
33	MF	(Ukraine)	Yehor Yarmolyuk	2	0	0	0	0	0	2	0	2
19	FW	(Cameroon)	Bryan Mbeumo	2	0	0	0	0	0	2	0	2
30	DF	(Denmark)	Mads Roerslev	1	0	1	0	0	0	2	0	2
26	MF	(Grenada)	Shandon Baptiste	1	0	0	0	0	0	1	0	1
3	DF	(Jamaica)	Rico Henry	1	0	0	0	0	0	1	0	1
5	DF	(Jamaica)	Ethan Pinnock	1	0	0	0	0	0	1	0	1
23	FW	(England)	Keane Lewis-Potter	0	0	1	0	0	0	1	0	1
25	MF	(England)	Myles Peart-Harris	0	0	1	0	0	0	1	0	1
Total				85	2	4	0	1	0	90	2	96

- Source: FBREF

=== International caps ===
No.	Pos.	Nat.	Player	Caps	Goals	Ref.
1	GK	(Netherlands)	Mark Flekken	3	0	
2	DF	(Scotland)	Aaron Hickey	3	0	
5	DF	(Jamaica)	Ethan Pinnock	8	0	
6	MF	(Denmark)	Christian Nørgaard	8	0	
8	MF	(Denmark)	Mathias Jensen	6	0	
9	FW	(Germany)	Kevin Schade	1	0	
11	FW	(Democratic Republic of the Congo)	Yoane Wissa	15	3	
13	DF	(Denmark)	Mathias Jørgensen	1	0	
14	MF	(Iran)	Saman Ghoddos	18	1	
15	MF	(Nigeria)	Frank Onyeka	14	1	
17	FW	(England)	Ivan Toney	5	1	
19	MF	(Cameroon)	Bryan Mbeumo	7	3	
20	DF	(Norway)	Kristoffer Ajer	11	1	
21	GK	(Albania)	Thomas Strakosha	9	0	
22	DF	(Republic of Ireland)	Nathan Collins	5	0	
24	MF	(Denmark)	Mikkel Damsgaard	3	0	
31	GK	(Iceland)	Hákon Valdimarsson	4	0	
―	GK	(Spain)	David Raya	4	0	
―	DF	(Wales)	Fin Stevens	2	0	

- Only international caps won while contracted to Brentford are counted.

== Honours ==
- Supporters' Player of the Year: Ethan Pinnock
- Players' Player of the Year: Vitaly Janelt
- Premier League Goal of the Month: Saman Ghoddos (October 2023)
- Premier League Save of the Month: Mark Flekken (February 2024)
