= Fábio Lopes (footballer, born 2001) =

Portuguese footballer

Personal information
- Full name: Fábio Jardel Veríssimo Lopes
- Date of birth: 7 December 2001 (age 24)
- Place of birth: Lisbon, Portugal
- Position: Forward

Team information
- Current team: Hungerford Town

Youth career
- Sporting CP
- 2015: Bicester Town
- Brackley Town
- 2018: Oxford United

Senior career*
| Years | Team | Apps | (Gls) |
| 2018–2021 | Oxford United | 0 | (0) |
| 2020 | → AFC Rushden & Diamonds (loan) | 1 | (0) |
| 2020 | → Biggleswade Town (loan) | 4 | (1) |
| 2021–2023 | Brackley Town | 13 | (0) |
| 2023– | Hungerford Town | 9 | (0) |
- * Club domestic league appearances and goals as of end of 2023–24 season

Fábio Jardel Veríssimo Lopes (born 7 December 2001) is a Portuguese professional footballer who plays as a forward for Hungerford Town.

== Career ==
Lopes began his career with Sporting CP before moving to English non-league club Bicester Town in 2015. After spending time with Brackley Town he joined the academy of Oxford United in April 2018. He made his debut on 14 August 2018 in the EFL Trophy, becoming the club's third-ever youngest player. He featured in four games in a week in the 2019–20 pre-season.

He joined AFC Rushden & Diamonds on loan in February 2020, before joining Biggleswade Town on a one-month youth loan in September 2020. In January 2021 a proposed loan move to Chippenham Town fell through after he was injured.

After leaving Oxford, he signed for Brackley Town, before moving to Hungerford Town.

== Career statistics ==
As of match played 4 January 2020

Appearances and goals by club, season and competition
| Club | Season | League | | | FA Cup | | League Cup | | Other | | Total | |
| Club | Season | Division | Apps | Goals | Apps | Goals | Apps | Goals | Apps | Goals | Apps | Goals |
|---|---|---|---|---|---|---|---|---|---|---|---|---|
| Oxford United | 2018–19 | League One | 0 | 0 | 0 | 0 | 1 | 0 | 1 (Note: Appearance(s) in the EFL Trophy.) | 0 | 2 | 0 |
| Oxford United | 2019–20 | League One | 0 | 0 | 1 | 0 | 0 | 0 | 3 | 0 | 4 | 0 |
| Oxford United | 2020–21 | League One | 0 | 0 | 0 | 0 | 0 | 0 | 0 | 0 | 0 | 0 |
| Career total | | | 0 | 0 | 1 | 0 | 1 | 0 | 4 | 0 | 6 | 0 |
