= Owen James =

English footballer

Personal information
- Full name: Owen James
- Date of birth: 13 October 2000 (age 26)
- Position: Forward

Team information
- Current team: Stratford Town

Youth career
- 2014–2017: Oxford United

Senior career*
Years	Team	Apps	(Gls)
2017–2020	Oxford United	1	(0)
2019	→ Oxford City (loan)	7	(0)
2019	→ Stratford Town (loan)		
2019	→ Bracknell Town (loan)		
2019–2020	→ Chalfont St Peter (loan)	6	(1)
2020–2021	Chalfont St Peter	8	(1)
2021–	Stratford Town	16	(1)
- * Club domestic league appearances and goals as of 22:23, 19 January 2022 (UTC)

Owen James (born 13 October 2000) is an English professional footballer who plays as a forward for Stratford Town.

== Career ==
James began his career in the Oxford United youth team at the age of 14, turning professional in October 2017. He made his senior debut on 5 May 2018, in a 2–1 league defeat against Blackburn Rovers. On 1 March 2019, James was loaned out to Oxford City for the rest of the season. However, in April 2019 he was loaned out to Stratford Town. In October 2019 he was loaned out to Bracknell Town. On 29 November 2019, he then joined Chalfont St Peter on loan for six weeks. The loan deal ended in January 2020, after 6 league appearances.

He was released by Oxford at the end of the 2019–20 season. Following his release from Oxford United, he moved to Chalfont St Peter on a permanent deal, but the season was again cut short due to COVID-19. In July 2021, he signed for Southern Football League Premier Division Central side Stratford Town.

== Career statistics ==
As of match played 22 April 2019

Appearances and goals by club, season and competition
Club	Season	League			FA Cup		League Cup		Other		Total	
Club	Season	Division	Apps	Goals	Apps	Goals	Apps	Goals	Apps	Goals	Apps	Goals
Oxford United	2017–18	League One	1	0	0	0	0	0	0	0	1	0
Oxford United	2018-19	League One	0	0	0	0	0	0	0	0	0	0
Oxford United	2019–20	League One	0	0	0	0	0	0	0	0	0	0
Oxford United	Total		1	0	0	0	0	0	0	0	1	0
Oxford City (loan)	2018–19	National League South	7	0	0	0	-		0	0	7	0
Career total			8	0	0	0	0	0	0	0	8	0
