= 2019–20 Oxford United F.C. season =

English football club season

Oxford United
2019–20 season
- Chairman: Sumrith Thanakarnjanasuth
- Manager: Karl Robinson
- Stadium: Kassam Stadium
- League One: 4th (on PPG)
- FA Cup: Fourth round
- EFL Cup: Quarter-finals
- EFL Trophy: Second round
- Top goalscorer: League: Matty Taylor (13); All: Matty Taylor (17)
- Highest home attendance: 11,817 (18 December vs. Manchester City, EFL Cup)
- Lowest home attendance: 1,084 (3 September vs. Norwich City U21, EFL Trophy)
- Average home league attendance: 7,460
Home colours	Away colours

The 2019–20 Oxford United season was the club's 126th year in existence and their fourth consecutive season in League One, the third tier of English football. As well as competing in League One, the club also participated in the FA Cup, EFL Cup and EFL Trophy. The season covered the period from 1 July 2019 to 30 June 2020.

== First-team squad ==
No.	Name	Nationality	Position	Date of birth (age)	Signed in	Previous club	Apps	Goals
Goalkeepers
1	Simon Eastwood	(England)	GK	26 June 1989 (age 37)	2016	(England) Blackburn Rovers	168	0
13	Jack Stevens	(England)	GK	2 August 1997 (age 29)	2016	(England) OUFC Academy	3	0
Defenders
3	Josh Ruffels	(England)	DF	23 October 1993 (age 32)	2013	(England) Coventry City	232	14
4	Rob Dickie	(England)	DF	3 March 1996 (age 30)	2018	(England) Reading	66	2
5	Elliott Moore	(England)	DF	16 March 1997 (age 29)	2019	(England) Leicester City	5	1
12	Sam Long	(England)	DF	16 January 1995 (age 31)	2013	(England) OUFC Academy	57	1
15	John Mousinho	(England)	DF	30 April 1986 (age 40)	2017	(England) Burton Albion	96	3
29	Kashif Siddiqi	(Pakistan)	DF	25 January 1986 (age 40)	2019	(England) Northampton Town	0	0
33	Kevin Berkoe	(England)	DF	5 July 2001 (age 25)	2019	(England) Wolverhampton Wanderers	3	0
35	Sam Allardyce	(England)	DF	1 September 2000 (age 26)	2019	(England) Bury	0	0
Midfielders
6	Alex Gorrin	(Spain)	MF	1 August 1993 (age 33)	2019	(Scotland) Motherwell	9	0
8	Cameron Brannagan	(England)	MF	9 May 1996 (age 30)	2018	(England) Liverpool	77	11
10	Ben Woodburn	(Wales)	MF	15 October 1999 (age 26)	2019	(England) Liverpool (loan)	11	1
11	Tariqe Fosu	(England)	MF	5 November 1995 (age 30)	2019	(England) Charlton Athletic	10	4
14	Anthony Forde	(Republic of Ireland)	MF	16 November 1993 (age 32)	2019	(England) Rotherham United	12	1
16	Shandon Baptiste	(Grenada)	MF	8 April 1998 (age 28)	2017	(England) OUFC Academy	21	2
18	Mark Sykes	(Northern Ireland)	MF	4 August 1997 (age 29)	2019	(Northern Ireland) Glenavon	14	1
20	Jamie Hanson	(England)	MF	10 November 1995 (age 30)	2018	(England) Derby County	49	0
21	Malachi Napa	(England)	MF	26 May 1999 (age 27)	2017	(England) OUFC Academy	18	0
22	George Thorne	(England)	MF	4 January 1993 (age 33)	2019	(England) Derby County (loan)	2	0
50	Tyler Goodrham	(England)	MF	7 August 2003 (age 23)	2019	(England) OUFC Academy	0	0
Forwards
7	Rob Hall	(England)	FW	20 October 1993 (age 32)	2016	(England) Bolton Wanderers	65	11
9	Matty Taylor	(England)	FW	30 March 1990 (age 36)	2019	(England) Bristol City (loan)	5	2
17	James Henry	(England)	FW	10 June 1989 (age 37)	2017	(England) Wolverhampton Wanderers	116	30
19	Jamie Mackie	(Scotland)	FW	22 September 1985 (age 40)	2018	(England) Queens Park Rangers	58	8
23	Dan Agyei	(England)	FW	1 June 1997 (age 29)	2019	(England) Burnley	2	0
37	Kyran Lofthouse	(England)	FW	15 September 2000 (age 26)	2019	(England) OUFC Academy	1	0

== Transfers ==
=== Transfers in ===
Date	Position	Nationality	Name	From	Fee	Ref.
1 July 2019	CB	(England)	Sam Allardyce	(England) Bury	Undisclosed	
1 July 2019	RB	(England)	Kevin Berkoe	(England) Wolverhampton Wanderers	Free transfer	
1 July 2019	AM	(England)	Tariqe Fosu	(England) Charlton Athletic	Compensation	
1 July 2019	CM	(Spain)	Alex Gorrin	(Scotland) Motherwell	Free transfer	
31 July 2019	RM	(Republic of Ireland)	Anthony Forde	(England) Rotherham United	Free transfer	
1 August 2019	CB	(England)	Elliott Moore	(England) Leicester City	Undisclosed	
10 August 2019	CF	(England)	Dan Agyei	(England) Burnley	Compensation	
29 August 2019	RB	(Pakistan)	Kashif Siddiqi	Free agent	Free transfer	
2 September 2019	LW	(Netherlands)	Oussama Zamouri	(Netherlands) FC Dordrecht	Free transfer	
4 September 2019	MF	(England)	Fabio Sole	(England) Reading	Free transfer	
6 December 2019	GK	(Scotland)	Jordan Archer	(England) Millwall	Free transfer	
9 January 2020	CB	(England)	Robert Atkinson	(England) Eastleigh	Undisclosed	
22 January 2020	DM	(England)	George Thorne	(England) Derby County	Undisclosed	

=== Loans in ===
Date from	Position	Nationality	Name	From	Date until	Ref.
23 July 2019	RM	(Scotland)	Chris Cadden	(United States) Columbus Crew SC	2 January 2020	
30 July 2019	LW	(Wales)	Ben Woodburn	(England) Liverpool	30 June 2020	
19 August 2019	CF	(England)	Matty Taylor	(England) Bristol City	30 June 2020	
19 August 2019	DM	(England)	George Thorne	(England) Derby County	January 2020	
8 January 2020	LW	(England)	Nathan Holland	(England) West Ham United	30 June 2020	
8 January 2020	AM	(Republic of Ireland)	Liam Kelly	(Netherlands) Feyenoord	30 June 2020	
9 January 2020	AM	(England)	Marcus Browne	(England) Middlesbrough	30 June 2020	

=== Loans out ===
Date from	Position	Nationality	Name	To	Date until	Ref.
20 September 2019	RB	(Pakistan)	Kashif Siddiqi	(India) Real Kashmir	30 June 2020	
18 October 2019	FW	(England)	Owen James	(England) Bracknell Town	November 2019	
1 November 2019	CM	(Northern Ireland)	Aaron Heap	(England) North Leigh	December 2019	
15 November 2019	RW	(England)	Kyran Lofthouse	(England) Oxford City	December 2019	
22 November 2019	LB	(England)	Kevin Berkoe	(England) Oxford City	20 December 2019	
22 November 2019	MF	(England)	Aaron McCreadie	(England) Hayes & Yeading United	December 2019	
3 January 2020	GK	(England)	Max Harris	(England) Oxford City	February 2020	
24 January 2020	CB	(England)	Robert Atkinson	(England) Eastleigh	30 June 2020	
24 January 2020	RW	(England)	Robert Hall	(England) Forest Green Rovers	30 June 2020	
11 February 2020	FW	(Portugal)	Fábio Lopes	(England) AFC Rushden & Diamonds	March 2020	
21 February 2020	DF	(Republic of Ireland)	Nico Jones	(England) Oxford City	March 2020	

=== Transfers out ===
Date	Position	Nationality	Name	To	Fee	Ref.
1 July 2019	GK	(England)	Niall Clayton	Free agent	Released	
1 July 2019	MF	(England)	Albie Hopkins	Free agent	Released	
1 July 2019	CB	(Republic of Ireland)	Fiacre Kelleher	(England) Macclesfield Town	Released	
1 July 2019	CM	(England)	Armani Little	(England) Torquay United	Free transfer	
1 July 2019	CB	(England)	Curtis Nelson	(Wales) Cardiff City	Free transfer	
1 July 2019	CF	(England)	Jonathan Obika	(Scotland) St Mirren	Released	
1 July 2019	CB	(England)	Charlie Raglan	(England) Cheltenham Town	Free transfer	
1 July 2019	GK	(Scotland)	Scott Shearer	Free agent	Released	
1 July 2019	CF	(Bermuda)	Jonte Smith	(England) Cheltenham Town	Released	
1 July 2019	FW	(England)	Brandon Taverner	Free agent	Released	
10 July 2019	CM	(Hong Kong)	Dai Wai-tsun	(England) Wolverhampton Wanderers	Undisclosed	
11 July 2019	CM	(England)	James Cowan	(Scotland) Airdrieonians	Free transfer	
30 July 2019	RW	(Northern Ireland)	Gavin Whyte	(Wales) Cardiff City	c.£2,000,000	
1 August 2019	CF	(England)	Harvey Bradbury	(England) Millwall	Free transfer	
3 September 2019	RB	(England)	Tony McMahon	Free agent	Mutual consent	
14 October 2019	LB	(England)	Matt Taylor	(England) Harrogate Town	Free transfer	
2 January 2020	MF	(Morocco)	Oussama Zamouri	Free agent	Released	
16 January 2020	GK	(Scotland)	Jordan Archer	(England) Fulham	Free transfer	
31 January 2020	CM	(Grenada)	Shandon Baptiste	(England) Brentford	Undisclosed	
31 January 2020	LW	(England)	Tariqe Fosu	(England) Brentford	Undisclosed	

== Pre-season ==
Win Draw Loss Postponed

On 10 May 2019, the U's announced their pre-season fixtures. A second home friendly against Fulham was added. Lastly a trip to Scotland to face Rangers was later confirmed.

7 July 2019 Friendly	Rangers	5–0	Oxford United	Glasgow, Scotland
15:00 BST	Candeias 16'; Stewart 32'; Mayo 53'; Ojo 70'; Defoe 90'	Report		Stadium: Ibrox Stadium

9 July 2019 Friendly	Oxford City	3–5	Oxford United	Marston
19:45 BST	Brown 3'; Self 42'; Rowe 52'	Report	Henry 45+1'; Fosu 62'; Whyte 68' (pen.); Lofthouse 73'; Napa 77'	Stadium: Court Place Farm; Attendance: 797

10 July 2019 Friendly	Thame United	0–2	Oxford United	Thame
19:45 BST		Report	Whyte 48' (pen.); Hall 79'	Stadium: The ASM Stadium; Attendance: 841

11 July 2019 Friendly	Brackley Town	1–2	Oxford United	Brackley
19:45 BST	Jones 37' (o.g.)	Report	Lopes 26'; Henry 29'	Stadium: St James Park; Attendance: 770

13 July 2019 Friendly	Woking	1–1	Oxford United	Woking
15:00 BST	Hyde 58'	Report	Frear 34'	Stadium: Laithwaite Community Stadium; Attendance: 716

16 July 2019 Friendly	Eastleigh	3–0	Oxford United	Eastleigh
19:45 BST	Williamson 13', 17'; Boyce 52'	Report		Stadium: Silverlake Stadium

20 July 2019 Friendly	Oxford United	1–2	Queens Park Rangers	Oxford
15:00 BST	Gorrin 39'	Report	Amos 31', 33'	Stadium: Kassam Stadium; Attendance: 3,165

23 July 2019 Friendly	Oxford United	1–1	Fulham	Oxford
19:45 BST	Mousinho 59'	Report	Knockaert 22'	Stadium: Kassam Stadium; Attendance: 2,549

27 July 2019 Friendly	Solihull Moors	1–1	Oxford United	Solihull
15:00 BST	Hancox 16'	Report	Brannagan 36'	Stadium: Automated Technology Group Stadium; Attendance: 709

== Competitions ==
=== League One ===
==== League table ====
Pos	Team	Pld	W	D	L	GF	GA	GD	Pts	PPG	Promotion, qualification or relegation
1	Coventry City (C, P)	34	18	13	3	48	30	+18	67	1.97	Promotion to the EFL Championship
2	Rotherham United (P)	35	18	8	9	61	38	+23	62	1.77	Promotion to the EFL Championship
3	Wycombe Wanderers (O, P)	34	17	8	9	45	40	+5	59	1.74	Qualification for League One play-offs (Note: Four teams play for one spot and promotion to the EFL Championship.)
4	Oxford United	35	17	9	9	61	37	+24	60	1.71	Qualification for League One play-offs
5	Portsmouth	35	17	9	9	53	36	+17	60	1.71	Qualification for League One play-offs
6	Fleetwood Town	35	16	12	7	51	38	+13	60	1.71	Qualification for League One play-offs
7	Peterborough United	35	17	8	10	68	40	+28	59	1.69	
8	Sunderland	36	16	11	9	48	32	+16	59	1.64	

Source: EFL Official Website
Rules for classification: 1) Points per game; 2) Goal difference; 3) Number of goals scored; 4) Head-to-head results; 5) Wins; 6) Away goals; 7) Penalty points (sec 9.5); 8) 12-point sending-off offences
(C) Champions; (O) Play-off winners; (P) Promoted

==== Results summary ====
Overall								Home						Away					
Pld	W	D	L	GF	GA	GD	Pts	W	D	L	GF	GA	GD	W	D	L	GF	GA	GD
35	17	9	9	61	37	+24	60	11	3	3	33	13	+20	6	6	6	28	24	+4

Last updated: 7 March 2020.
Source: BBC

==== Results by matchday ====
Matchday	1	2	3	4	5	6	7	8	9	10	11	12	13	14	15	16	17	18	19	20	21	22	23	24	25	26	27	28	29	30	31	32	33	34	35
Ground	A	H	A	H	A	H	A	H	A	A	H	A	H	A	H	A	A	H	A	H	H	A	A	H	H	A	H	A	A	H	H	A	H	H	A
Result	D	W	L	L	L	D	L	W	D	W	W	D	W	W	W	D	W	D	L	W	W	W	L	L	D	D	W	L	D	L	W	W	W	W	W
Position	12	7	11	16	17	18	20	17	17	12	10	9	8	5	5	4	6	7	8	6	3	2	4	5	5	5	8	10	10	11	10	9	8	6	3

Updated to match(es) played on 7 March 2020. Source: Statto.com
A = Away; H = Home; W = Win; D = Draw; L = Loss

==== Matches ====
On Thursday, 20 June 2019, the EFL League One fixtures were released.

3 August 2019 1	Sunderland	1–1	Oxford United	Monkwearmouth
15:00 BST	Fosu 14'; Mousinho (yellow card) 56'; Gorrin (yellow card) 65'; Brannagan (yellow card) 90+5'; Henry (yellow card) 90+5'	Report	Gooch 49' (pen.) (yellow card) 70'	Stadium: Stadium of Light; Attendance: 33,498 (1,122 away); Referee: Peter Wright

10 August 2019 2	Oxford United	1–0	Peterborough United	Oxford
15:00 BST	Brannagan 12' (yellow card) 16'; Gorrin (yellow card) 56'; Mousinho (yellow card) 76'	Report	Boyd (yellow card) 18'; Kent (yellow card) 43'	Stadium: Kassam Stadium; Attendance: 6,959 (744 away); Referee: Michael Salisbury

17 August 2019 3	Blackpool	2–1	Oxford United	Blackpool
15:00 BST	Edwards 5'; Gnanduillet 45+2'; Thompson (yellow card) 60'; Alnwick (yellow card) 62'; Tilt (yellow card) 89'	Report	Gorrin (yellow card) 43'; Mousinho (yellow card) 45+1'; Ruffels 45+4'; Hall (yellow card) 82'; Moore (yellow card) 90+5'; Brannagan (yellow card)	Stadium: Bloomfield Road; Attendance: 9,104 (894 away); Referee: Darren Drysdale

20 August 2019 4	Oxford United	2–4	Burton Albion	Oxford
19:45 BST	Brannagan 47'; Forde 56'; Gorrin (yellow card) 74'	Report	Buxton 30'; Edwards (yellow card) 34'; Broadhead (yellow card) 42'; Fraser 61' 70' 84'	Stadium: The Kassam Stadium; Attendance: 6,111 (161 away); Referee: Brett Huxtable

24 August 2019 5	Bristol Rovers	3–1	Oxford United	Horfield
15:00 BST	Clarke (yellow card) 10'; Upson (yellow card) 22' (goal) 37'; Clarke-Harris 45'; Davies (yellow card) 56'; Nichols 77'	Report	Taylor (yellow card) 15'; Woodburn 27'; Hanson (yellow card) 41'; Fosu (yellow card) 45+4'	Stadium: Memorial Stadium; Attendance: 7,871 (993 away); Referee: Charles Breakspear

31 August 2019 6	Oxford United	3–3	Coventry City	Oxford
15:00 BST	Dickie (yellow card) 41'; Forde (yellow card) 62'; Mackie 64' (yellow card) 90+6'; Ruffels (yellow card) 67'; Dabo 85', 90+4' (o.g.)	Report	Shipley (yellow card) 29'; Westbrooke 35' (yellow card) 74'; Godden 56'; O'Hare 90+1'	Stadium: The Kassam Stadium; Attendance: 8,080 (1,810 away); Referee: Graham Salisbury

7 September 2019 7	Fleetwood Town	2–1	Oxford United	Fleetwood
15:00 BST	Madden 15'; Clarke 79'; Coutts (yellow card) 89'	Report	Moore 33'; Mackie (yellow card) 40'; Baptiste (yellow card) 49'	Stadium: Highbury Stadium; Attendance: 2,672; Referee: Trevor Kettle

14 September 2019 8	Oxford United	3–0	Tranmere Rovers	Oxford
15:00 BST	Henry 23' (pen.) 90+2' (pen.); Dickie (yellow card) 51'; Woodburn (yellow card) 63'; Brannagan 70'	Report	Woods (yellow card) 26'; Nelson (yellow card) 57'	Stadium: The Kassam Stadium; Attendance: 6,294 (639 away); Referee: Robert Lewis

17 September 2019 9	Bolton Wanderers	0–0	Oxford United	Horwich
20:00 BST	Hobbs (yellow card) 55'; Politic (yellow card) 64'	Report		Stadium: University of Bolton Stadium; Attendance: 6,786 (364 away); Referee: Paul Marsden

21 September 2019 10	Lincoln City	0–6	Oxford United	Lincoln
15:00 BST	Eardley (yellow card) 56'; Andrade (yellow card) 86'	Report	Fosu 5', 40', 70'; Ruffels (yellow card) 14'; Mackie 48' (yellow card) 64'; Henry 54'; Taylor 79' (yellow card) 90+1'; Dickie (yellow card) 86'	Stadium: Sincil Bank; Attendance: 8,746 (668 away); Referee: Anthony Backhouse

28 September 2019 11	Oxford United	3–0	Gillingham	Oxford
15:00 BST	Henry 10' 34'; Taylor 30'; Brannagan (yellow card) 86'	Report	Fuller (yellow card) 57'; Ehmer (yellow card) 82'	Stadium: The Kassam Stadium; Attendance: 6,553 (483 away); Referee: Andy Woolmer

5 October 2019 12	Accrington Stanley	2–2	Oxford United	Accrington
15:00 BST	Finley (yellow card) 31'; Johnson (yellow card) 44'; Opoku (yellow card) 45+4'; Clark 59' (yellow card) 64'; Zanzala 73'; Conneely (yellow card) 90+3'	Report	Fosu 28'; Henry (yellow card) 45+4'; Mackie (yellow card) 45+5'; Brannagan 70' (yellow card) 79'; Taylor (yellow card) 89'	Stadium: Crown Ground; Attendance: 2,590 (486 away); Referee: Martin Coy

12 October 2019 13	Oxford United	3–0	Doncaster Rovers	Oxford
15:00 BST	Henry 45+1', 78' (pen.); Brannagan 47'; Dickie (yellow card) 75'	Report	Taylor (yellow card) 30'; Anderson (yellow card) 55'	Stadium: The Kassam Stadium; Attendance: 6,861 (491 away); Referee: Seb Stockbridge

19 October 2019 14	Rotherham United	1–2	Oxford United	Rotherham
15:00 BST	Ihiekwe 35'	Report	Fosu 23'; Taylor 57' (yellow card) 83'	Stadium: New York Stadium; Attendance: 8,837 (734 away); Referee: Scott Oldham

26 October 2019 15	Oxford United	3–0	Rochdale	Oxford
15:00 BST	Ruffels 20'; Fosu 27'; Sykes (yellow card) 45'; Long 86'	Report	Wilbraham (red card) 40'	Stadium: The Kassam Stadium; Attendance: 6,666 (206 away); Referee: Nick Kinseley

2 November 2019 16	Portsmouth	1–1	Oxford United	Portsmouth
15:00 GMT	McCrorie (yellow card) 39'; Evans 58' (pen.); Marquis (yellow card) 87'	Report	Mackie (yellow card) 26'; Taylor 90'	Stadium: Fratton Park; Attendance: 18,528 (1,747 away); Referee: Ben Toner

16 November 2019	Oxford United	v	Ipswich Town	Oxford
15:00 GMT		Report		Stadium: The Kassam Stadium
Note: On 7 November, the match was postponed because of international call-ups.

23 November 2019 17	Southend United	0–4	Oxford United	Southend-on-Sea
15:00 GMT	Milligan (yellow card) 45+2'	Report	Taylor 1', 84'; Rodriguez (yellow card) 26'; Henry 33' (yellow card) 35'; Agyei 86'	Stadium: Roots Hall; Attendance: 6,835 (905 away); Referee: Tom Nield

7 December 2019 18	Oxford United	0–0	Shrewsbury Town	Oxford
15:00 GMT	Dickie (yellow card) 14'	Report	Ebanks-Landell (yellow card) 73'; Edwards (yellow card) 84'; Pierre (yellow card) 89'; Williams (yellow card) 90+3'	Stadium: Kassam Stadium; Attendance: 6,931 (383 away); Referee: Craig Hicks

14 December 2019 19	Milton Keynes Dons	1–0	Oxford United	Denbigh
15:00 GMT	Houghton (yellow card) 17'; Mason 59'; Nicholls (yellow card) 67'; Lewington (yellow card) 75'; Agard (yellow card) 82'; Reeves (yellow card) 90+7'	Report	Dickie (yellow card) 39'; Fosu (yellow card) 88'; Rodriguez (yellow card) 90+6'	Stadium: Stadium MK; Attendance: 10,031 (2,850 away); Referee: Trevor Kettle

21 December 2019 20	Oxford United	1–0	Wycombe Wanderers	Oxford
15:00 GMT	Henry 23'; Rodriguez (yellow card) 27'; Mousinho (yellow card) 27'; Dickie (yellow card) 72'; Sykes (yellow card) 90+3'	Report	Akinfenwa (yellow card) 20' (yellow-red card) 26'; Bloomfield (yellow card) 44'; Ofoborh (yellow card) 90'; Jacobson (yellow card) 90+2'	Stadium: Kassam Stadium; Attendance: 10,123 (1,802 away); Referee: Lee Swabey

26 December 2019 21	Oxford United	1–0	Lincoln City	Oxford
15:00 GMT	Baptiste 36' (yellow card) 82'; Mousinho (yellow card) 71'	Report	O'Connor (yellow card) 45+1'; Morrell (yellow card) 69'	Stadium: Kassam Stadium; Attendance: 10,115 (630 away); Referee: Will Finnie

29 December 2019 22	AFC Wimbledon	1–2	Oxford United	Kingston upon Thames
15:00 GMT	Guinness-Walker (yellow card) 45+1'; Pigott 47'; Rudoni (yellow card) 84'	Report	Brannagan (yellow card) 7'; McLoughlin 26' (o.g.); Sykes 61'	Stadium: Kingsmeadow; Attendance: 4,763 (776 away); Referee: Sam Purkiss

1 January 2020 23	Doncaster Rovers	1–0	Oxford United	Doncaster
15:00 GMT	James 34' (yellow card) 57'	Report	Henry (yellow card) 74'	Stadium: Keepmoat Stadium; Attendance: 4,763 (759 away); Referee: Seb Stockbridge

11 January 2020 24	Oxford United	1–3	Rotherham United	Oxford
15:00 GMT	Rodriguez (yellow card) 8'; Browne 71'; Long (yellow card) 83'	Report	Vassell 16', 33'; Wood 45+6'; Wiles (yellow card) 52'; Lindsay (yellow card) 83'	Stadium: Kassam Stadium; Attendance: 8,077 (894 away); Referee: David Webb

14 January 2020 25	Oxford United	0–0	Ipswich Town	Oxford
19:45 GMT	Browne (yellow card) 72'	Report	Edwards (yellow card) 63'	Stadium: Kassam Stadium; Attendance: 8,191 (1,319 away); Referee: Tom Nield

18 January 2020 26	Gillingham	1–1	Oxford United	Gillingham
15:00 GMT	Lee (yellow card) 45+1' (goal) 61' (pen.)	Report	Fosu 16'; Mackie (yellow card) 37'; Baptiste (yellow card) 75'; Browne (yellow card) 86'	Stadium: Priestfield Stadium; Attendance: 5,051 (535 away); Referee: Neil Hair

1 February 2020 27	Oxford United	2–1	Blackpool	Oxford
15:00 GMT	Browne 18', 40'; Brannagan (yellow card) 36'; Gorrin (yellow card) 53'	Report	Thorniley (yellow card) 1'; Madine 10'; Bola (yellow card) 36'	Stadium: Kassam Stadium; Attendance: 7,525 (476 away); Referee: Josh Smith

8 February 2020 28	Peterborough United	4–0	Oxford United	Peterborough
15:00 GMT	Dembélé 36'; Thompson (yellow card) 44' (yellow-red card) 63'; Toney 56', 77' (yellow card) 90+1'; Knight 90+6'	Report	Mousinho (yellow card) 76'	Stadium: London Road Stadium; Attendance: 8,363 (862 away); Referee: Andy Haines

11 February 2020 29	Burton Albion	2–2	Oxford United	Burton upon Trent
19:45 GMT	Dickie 20' (o.g.); Murphy 71'; Powell (yellow card) 89'	Report	Gorrin (yellow card) 41'; Taylor (yellow card) 45+2' (goal) 90+1'; Agyei 63'; Dickie (yellow card) 89'	Stadium: Pirelli Stadium; Attendance: 2,278 (415 away); Referee: Steve Martin

15 February 2020 30	Oxford United	0–1	Sunderland	Oxford
15:00 GMT	Brannagan (yellow card) 90+2'	Report	Mousinho 3' (o.g.)	Stadium: Kassam Stadium; Attendance: 9,105 (1,776 away); Referee: Kevin Johnson

18 February 2020 31	Oxford United	5–0	AFC Wimbledon	Oxford
19:45 GMT	Taylor 32', 90+3'; Holland 34', 55'; Henry 50'	Report	Guinness-Walker (yellow card) 72'	Stadium: Kassam Stadium; Attendance: 6,155 (380 away); Referee: Sam Purkiss

22 February 2020 32	Ipswich Town	0–1	Oxford United	Ipswich
15:00 BST	Garbutt (yellow card) 38'; Jackson (red card) 90+3'; Woolfenden (yellow card) 90+4'	Report	Taylor 44'; Browne (yellow card) 64'	Stadium: Portman Road; Attendance: 19,363 (1,365 away); Referee: Scott Oldham

25 February 2020 33	Oxford United	3–0	Accrington Stanley	Oxford
19:45 BST	Henry 13'; Taylor 50' 72'	Report	Finley (yellow card) 71'; Johnson (yellow card) 77'	Stadium: Kassam Stadium; Attendance: 5,622 (69 away); Referee: David Rock

29 February 2020 34	Oxford United	2–1	Southend	Oxford
15:00 BST	Henry 17' (pen.); Gorrin (yellow card) 51'; Taylor 84'	Report	Gard 45'; McLaughlin (yellow card) 54'	Stadium: Kassam Stadium; Attendance: 7,451 (485 away); Referee: Lee Swabey

7 March 2020 35	Shrewsbury Town	2–3	Oxford United	Shrewsbury
15:00 BST	Vela (yellow card) 9' (yellow-red card) 35'; Udoh 12'; Lang 34'; Ebanks-Landell (yellow card) 62'; Edwards (yellow card) 87'	Report	Browne 45+3'; Agyei 59'; Brannagan (yellow card) 66'; Ruffels 88'	Stadium: New Meadow; Attendance: 6,474 (928 away); Referee: Seb Stockbridge

14 March 2020	Oxford United	v	Milton Keynes Dons	Oxford
15:00 GMT				Stadium: Kassam Stadium
Note: Season was suspended until 3 April 2020, because of the COVID-19 pandemic.

21 March 2020	Wycombe Wanderers	v	Oxford United	High Wycombe
15:00 GMT				Stadium: Adams Park
Note: Season was suspended until 3 April 2020, because of the COVID-19 pandemic.

28 March 2020	Oxford United	v	Portsmouth	Oxford
15:00 GMT				Stadium: Kassam Stadium
Note: Season was suspended until 3 April 2020, because of the COVID-19 pandemic.

4 April 2020	Rochdale	v	Oxford United	Spotland
15:00 GMT				Stadium: Crown Oil Arena
Note: On 3 April, the English Football League decided to postpone all football until safe to resume because of the COVID-19 pandemic outbreak.

10 April 2020	Oxford United	v	Bristol Rovers	Oxford
13:00 BST				Stadium: Kassam Stadium
Note: On 3 April, the English Football League decided to postpone all football until safe to resume because of the COVID-19 pandemic outbreak.

13 April 2020	Coventry City	v	Oxford United	Bordesley
13:00 BST				Stadium: St Andrew's Trillion Trophy Stadium
Note: On 3 April, the English Football League decided to postpone all football until safe to resume because of the COVID-19 pandemic outbreak.

18 April 2020	Oxford United	v	Fleetwood Town	Oxford
15:00 BST				Stadium: Kassam Stadium
Note: On 3 April, the English Football League decided to postpone all football until safe to resume because of the COVID-19 pandemic outbreak.

25 April 2020	Tranmere Rovers	v	Oxford United	Birkenhead
15:00 BST				Stadium: Prenton Park
Note: On 3 April, the English Football League decided to postpone all football until safe to resume because of the COVID-19 pandemic outbreak.

3 May 2020	Oxford United	v	Bolton Wanderers	Oxford
15:00 BST				Stadium: Kassam Stadium
Note: On 3 April, the English Football League decided to postpone all football until safe to resume because of the COVID-19 pandemic outbreak.

==== Play-offs ====
3 July 2020 Semi-final first leg	Portsmouth	1–1	Oxford United	Portsmouth
17:30 BST	McGeehan (yellow card) 28'; Curtis 32'	Report	Brannagan (yellow card) 28'; Browne 43'; Rodríguez (yellow card) 87'	Stadium: Fratton Park; Attendance: 0 Referee: Gavin Ward

6 July 2020 Semi-final second leg	Oxford United	1–1 (a.e.t.) (2–2 agg.) (5–4 p)	Portsmouth	Oxford
17:00 BST	Harrison 45+3' (o.g.); Long (yellow card) 58'; Browne (yellow card) 73'; Dickie (yellow card) 91'; Rodríguez (yellow card) 103'; Taylor (yellow card) 107'	Report	Harness 38'; Marquis (yellow card) 64'; Curtis (yellow card) 90+4'	Stadium: Kassam Stadium; Attendance: 0 Referee: Darren England
	Penalties
	Woodburn (penalty scored); Forde (penalty scored); Taylor (penalty scored); Mousinho (penalty scored); Brannagan (penalty scored)		(penalty scored) Marquis; (penalty scored) Evans; (penalty scored) Brown; (penalty missed) McGeehan; (penalty scored) Hawkins

13 July 2020 Final	Oxford United	1–2	Wycombe Wanderers	Wembley
19:30 BST	Rodríguez (yellow card) 27'; Sykes 57'	Report	Stewart 9'; Thompson (yellow card) 71'; Jacobson 79' (pen.)	Stadium: Wembley Stadium; Attendance: Behind closed doors Referee: Robert Jones

=== FA Cup ===
The draw for the first round proper was held on 21 October 2019. The second round draw was made live on 11 November from Chichester City's stadium, Oaklands Park. The draw for the third round was held on 2 December 2019. The fourth round draw was made by Alex Scott and David O'Leary on Monday, 6 January.

10 November 2019 First round	Hayes & Yeading United	0–2	Oxford United	Hayes
14:15 GMT	Rowe (yellow card) 16'; Della-Verde (yellow card) 85'	Report	Long 29'; Hall 69'	Stadium: Beaconsfield Road; Attendance: 1,501 (719 away); Referee: Darren Handley

30 November 2019 Second round	Walsall	0–1	Oxford United	Bescot
15:00 GMT	Cockerill-Mollett (yellow card) 25'; Kinsella (yellow card) 41'	Report	Dickie (yellow card) 19'; Henry 84'; Hall (yellow card) 90+1'	Stadium: Banks's Stadium; Attendance: 3,224 (1,375 away); Referee: Leigh Doughty

4 January 2020 Third round	Oxford United	4–1	Hartlepool United	Oxford
15:01 GMT	Dickie (yellow card) 17'; Rob Hall 51'; Baptiste 66'; Fosu 84'; Taylor 87' (pen.)	Report	Kitching 9'; Mafuta (yellow card) 42'; Kerr (yellow card) 45'	Stadium: Kassam Stadium; Attendance: 6,240 (779 away); Referee: Michael Salisbury

25 January 2020 Fourth round	Newcastle United	0–0	Oxford United	Newcastle upon Tyne
15:00 GMT	Lascelles (yellow card) 11'	Report	Baptiste (yellow card) 64'; Rodriguez (yellow card) 75'; Sykes (yellow card) 85'	Stadium: St James' Park; Attendance: 52,221 (3,710 away); Referee: Robert Jones

4 February 2020 Fourth round replay	Oxford United	2–3 (a.e.t.)	Newcastle United	Oxford
20:05 GMT	Sykes (yellow card) 45'; Kelly (yellow card) 77' (goal) 84'; Holland 90+4'	Report	Longstaff 15'; Joelinton 30'; Bentaleb (yellow card) 45'; Lejeune (yellow card) 95'; Saint-Maximin 116'	Stadium: Kassam Stadium; Attendance: 11,520 (1,779 away); Referee: Peter Bankes

=== EFL Cup ===
The first-round draw was made on 20 June. The second-round draw was made on 13 August 2019 following the conclusion of all but one first-round matches. The third round draw was confirmed on 28 August 2019, live on Sky Sports. The draw for the fourth round was made on 25 September 2019. The quarter-final draw was conducted on 31 October, live on BBC Radio 2. After convincingly beating Premier League opponents West Ham in the third round, Oxford were eliminated at the quarter-final stage by eventual winners Manchester City, who had also beaten them in the same competition in an earlier round the previous season.

13 August 2019 First round	Oxford United	1–0	Peterborough United	Oxford
19:45 BST	Long (yellow card) 55'; Brannagan 88'	Report	Kent (yellow card) 25'; Toney (yellow card) 64'; Mason (yellow card) 87'	Stadium: Kassam Stadium; Attendance: 2,798 (238 away); Referee: Ollie Yates

27 August 2019 Second round	Oxford United	2–2 (4–2 p)	Millwall	Oxford
19:45 BST	Sykes (yellow card) 58', (goal) 87'; Mousinho (yellow card) 69'; Hanson (yellow card) 73'; Berkoe (yellow card) 80'; Henry 90+4' (pen.)	Report	Böðvarsson 29', 52'	Stadium: Kassam Stadium; Attendance: 3,693 (735 away); Referee: Craig Hicks
	Penalties
	Thorne (penalty scored); Woodburn (penalty scored); Henry (penalty scored); Mousinho (penalty scored)		(penalty scored) McCarthy; (penalty missed) Böðvarsson; (penalty missed) Ferguson; (penalty scored) Williams

25 September 2019 Third round	Oxford United	4–0	West Ham United	Oxford
19:45 BST	Moore 55' (yellow card) 66'; Taylor 71'; Fosu 84'; Baptiste 90+2'	Report	Snodgrass (yellow card) 68'	Stadium: Kassam Stadium; Attendance: 10,450 (1,513 away); Referee: Robert Jones

29 October 2019 Fourth round	Oxford United	1–1 (4–2 p)	Sunderland	Oxford
19:45 GMT	Hall 25'	Report	McNulty 78'	Stadium: Kassam Stadium; Attendance: 11,108 (1,269 away); Referee: Steve Martin
	Penalties
	Henry (penalty scored); Forde (penalty scored); Fosu (penalty scored); Mousinho (penalty scored)		Power (penalty scored); O'Nien (penalty scored); Grigg (penalty missed); McNulty (penalty missed)

18 December 2019 Quarter-final	Oxford United	1–3	Manchester City	Oxford
19:45 GMT	Taylor 46'	Report	Cancelo 22'; Sterling 51', 70'	Stadium: The Kassam Stadium; Attendance: 11,817 (1,200 away); Referee: Andrew Madley

=== EFL Trophy ===
On 9 July 2019, the pre-determined group stage draw was announced with invited clubs to be drawn on 12 July 2019. The draw for the second round was made on 16 November 2019 live on Sky Sports.

Pos	Div	Team	Pld	W	PW	PL	L	GF	GA	GD	Pts	Qualification
1	L1	Portsmouth	3	2	1	0	0	6	3	+3	8	Advance to Round 2
2	L1	Oxford United	3	2	0	1	0	8	4	+4	7	Advance to Round 2
3	ACA	Norwich City U21	3	1	0	0	2	4	6	−2	3	
4	L2	Crawley Town	3	0	0	0	3	2	7	−5	0	

Source: EFL.com

3 September 2019 Group stage	Oxford United	2–1	Norwich City U21	Oxford
19:45 BST	Dickie (yellow card) 53'; Long (yellow card) 56'; Brannagan 77'; Baptiste 85'	Report	Nizet (yellow card) 56'; Hutchinson 64'	Stadium: The Kassam Stadium; Attendance: 1,084 (152 away); Referee: Chris Sarginson

8 October 2019 Group stage	Oxford United	2–2 (4–5 p)	Portsmouth	Oxford
19:45 BST	Taylor 21'; Dickie 90+1'; Agyei (yellow card) 90+4'	Report	Rew (yellow card) 19'; Lethbridge 33'; Walkes 85'; Haunstrup (yellow card) 90+1'	Stadium: The Kassam Stadium; Attendance: 1548 (274 away); Referee: Will Finnie
	Penalties
	Sole (penalty scored); Brannagan (penalty scored); Hall (penalty scored); Sykes (penalty scored); Ruffels (penalty missed); Agyei (penalty missed); Long (penalty missed)		Evans (penalty scored); Harrison (penalty scored); Close (penalty missed); Williams (penalty scored); Downing (penalty scored); Walkes (penalty missed); Haunstrup (penalty scored)

12 November 2019 Group stage	Crawley Town	1–4	Oxford United	Crawley
19:45 BST	Bloomfield 50'; Francomb (red card) 56'	Report	Hall 12' 57' (pen.) 73' (pen.); Forde 28' (pen.)	Stadium: The Peoples Pension Stadium; Attendance: 412 (100 away); Referee: Joshua Smith

4 December 2019 Second round	Exeter City	0–0 (3–0 p)	Oxford United	Exeter
19:00 GMT	Tillson (yellow card) 30'	Report	Mackie (yellow card) 61'	Stadium: St James Park; Attendance: 483 (130 away); Referee: Kevin Johnson
	Penalties
	Jay (penalty scored); Sweeney (penalty scored); Seymour (penalty scored)		Forde (penalty missed); Hall (penalty missed); Sykes (penalty missed)

== Squad statistics ==
=== Appearances and goals ===
As of 7 March 2020.

No.	Pos	Nat	Player	Total		League One		FA Cup		League Cup		FL Trophy	
No.	Pos	Nat	Player	Apps	Goals	Apps	Goals	Apps	Goals	Apps	Goals	Apps	Goals
1	GK	(England) ENG	Simon Eastwood	38	0	29	0	4	0	4	0	1	0
2	DF	(Scotland) SCO	Chris Cadden	23	0	21	0	2	0	0	0	0	0
3	DF	(England) ENG	Josh Ruffels	44	3	35	3	3	0	4	0	2	0
4	DF	(England) ENG	Robert Dickie	47	1	35	0	5	0	4	0	3	1
5	DF	(England) ENG	Elliott Moore	31	2	11+8	1	4+1	0	5	1	2	0
6	MF	(Spain) ESP	Alex Gorrin	41	0	29+2	0	5	0	2	0	3	0
7	FW	(England) ENG	Robert Hall	24	6	3+10	0	1+2	2	4	1	4	3
8	MF	(England) ENG	Cameron Brannagan	36	7	29+1	5	1	0	3	1	1+1	1
9	FW	(England) ENG	Matty Taylor	34	17	20+6	13	2+2	1	2+1	2	1	1
10	FW	(Wales) WAL	Ben Woodburn	13	1	11	1	0	0	0+2	0	0	0
11	FW	(England) ENG	Tariqe Fosu	34	10	21+4	8	4	1	2+1	1	2	0
12	DF	(England) ENG	Sam Long	27	2	10+6	1	3	1	5	0	3	0
13	GK	(England) ENG	Jack Stevens	3	0	0	0	0	0	0	0	3	0
14	MF	(Republic of Ireland) IRL	Anthony Forde	27	2	9+9	1	2	0	4	0	3	1
15	DF	(England) ENG	John Mousinho	33	0	25+1	0	1	0	1+2	0	2+1	0
16	MF	(Grenada) GRN	Shandon Baptiste	27	4	9+8	1	3	1	4	1	3	1
17	MF	(England) ENG	James Henry	35	14	30	12	2	1	1+2	1	0	0
18	MF	(Northern Ireland) NIR	Mark Sykes	35	2	17+6	1	3+1	0	2+2	1	3+1	0
19	FW	(Scotland) SCO	Jamie Mackie	41	2	15+17	2	3+1	0	3+1	0	1	0
20	MF	(England) ENG	Jamie Hanson	10	0	2+3	0	0+1	0	2	0	1+1	0
21	MF	(England) ENG	Malachi Napa	1	0	0	0	0	0	1	0	0	0
22	MF	(England) ENG	George Thorne	7	0	1+3	0	0+1	0	1+1	0	0	0
23	FW	(England) ENG	Dan Agyei	22	3	1+12	3	0+4	0	1	0	3+1	0
26	GK	(Scotland) SCO	Jordan Archer	7	0	5	0	1	0	1	0	0	0
27	MF	(England) ENG	Nathan Holland	12	3	7+3	2	1+1	1	0	0	0	0
28	MF	(Republic of Ireland) IRL	Liam Kelly	4	1	1+2	0	0+1	1	0	0	0	0
30	MF	(Morocco) MAR	Oussama Zamouri	1	0	0	0	0	0	0	0	1	0
30	MF	(England) ENG	Marcus Browne	15	4	8+3	4	4	0	0	0	0	0
33	DF	(England) ENG	Kevin Berkoe	4	0	0	0	0	0	1+1	0	2	0
37	FW	(England) ENG	Kyran Lofthouse	1	0	0	0	0	0	0	0	0+1	0
47	DF	(Republic of Ireland) IRL	Nico Jones	1	0	0	0	0	0	0	0	1	0
47	FW	(Portugal) POR	Fábio Lopes	4	0	0	0	0+1	0	0	0	0+3	0
48	MF	(England) ENG	Fabio Sole	1	0	0	0	0	0	0	0	0+1	0
56	MF	(England) ENG	Tyler Goodrham	1	0	0	0	0	0	0	0	0+1	0

== Top scorers ==
As of 7 March 2020

Place	Position	Nation	Number	Name	League One	FA Cup	League Cup	FL Trophy	Total
1	FW	(England)	9	Matty Taylor	13	1	2	1	17
2	MF	(England)	17	James Henry	12	1	1	0	14
3	FW	(England)	11	Tariqe Fosu	8	1	1	0	10
4	MF	(England)	8	Cameron Brannagan	5	0	1	1	7
5	FW	(England)	7	Robert Hall	0	2	1	3	6
6=	MF	(England)	16	Shandon Baptiste	1	1	1	1	4
6=	MF	(England)	30	Marcus Browne	4	0	0	0	4
8=	DF	(England)	3	Josh Ruffels	3	0	0	0	3
8=	FW	(England)	23	Dan Agyei	3	0	0	0	3
8=	MF	(England)	27	Nathan Holland	2	1	0	0	3
8=	Own goal				3	0	0	0	3
12=	DF	(England)	5	Elliott Moore	1	0	1	0	2
12=	MF	(Republic of Ireland)	14	Anthony Forde	1	0	0	1	2
12=	DF	(England)	12	Sam Long	1	1	0	0	2
12=	FW	(Scotland)	19	Jamie Mackie	2	0	0	0	2
12=	MF	(Northern Ireland)	18	Mark Sykes	1	0	1	0	2
17=	DF	(England)	4	Robert Dickie	0	0	0	1	1
17=	FW	(Wales)	10	Ben Woodburn	1	0	0	0	1
17=	MF	(Republic of Ireland)	28	Liam Kelly	0	1	0	0	1
TOTALS					61	9	9	8	88

=== Disciplinary record ===
As of 7 March 2020.

Number	Nation	Position	Name	League One		FA Cup		League Cup		FL Trophy		Total	
Number	Nation	Position	Name	Booked	Sent off (straight red)	Booked	Sent off (straight red)	Booked	Sent off (straight red)	Booked	Sent off (straight red)	Booked	Sent off (straight red)
3	(England)	DF	Josh Ruffels	3	0	0	0	0	0	0	0	3	0
4	(England)	DF	Robert Dickie	8	0	2	0	0	0	1	0	11	0
5	(England)	DF	Elliott Moore	1	0	0	0	0	0	1	0	2	0
6	(Spain)	MF	Alex Gorrin	11	0	1	0	0	0	0	0	12	0
7	(England)	FW	Robert Hall	1	0	1	0	0	0	0	0	2	0
8	(England)	MF	Cameron Brannagan	9	0	0	0	0	0	0	0	9	0
9	(England)	FW	Matty Taylor	5	0	0	0	0	0	0	0	5	0
10	(Wales)	FW	Ben Woodburn	1	0	0	0	0	0	0	0	1	0
11	(England)	FW	Tariqe Fosu	2	0	0	0	0	0	0	0	2	0
12	(England)	DF	Sam Long	1	0	0	0	1	0	1	0	3	0
14	(Republic of Ireland)	MF	Anthony Forde	1	0	0	0	0	0	0	0	1	0
15	(England)	DF	John Mousinho	6	0	0	0	1	0	0	0	7	0
16	(Grenada)	MF	Shandon Baptiste	3	0	1	0	0	0	0	0	4	0
17	(England)	MF	James Henry	4	0	0	0	0	0	0	0	4	0
18	(Northern Ireland)	MF	Mark Sykes	2	0	2	0	1	0	0	0	5	0
19	(Scotland)	FW	Jamie Mackie	6	0	0	0	0	0	1	0	7	0
20	(England)	MF	Jamie Hanson	1	0	0	0	1	0	0	0	2	0
23	(England)	FW	Dan Agyei	0	0	0	0	0	0	1	0	1	0
28	(Republic of Ireland)	MF	Liam Kelly	0	0	1	0	0	0	0	0	1	0
30	(England)	MF	Marcus Browne	3	0	0	0	0	0	0	0	3	0
33	(England)	DF	Kevin Berkoe	0	0	0	0	1	0	0	0	1	0
TOTALS				61	0	7	0	6	0	4	0	'78	0
