= Ben Woodburn =

Wales international footballer (born 1999)

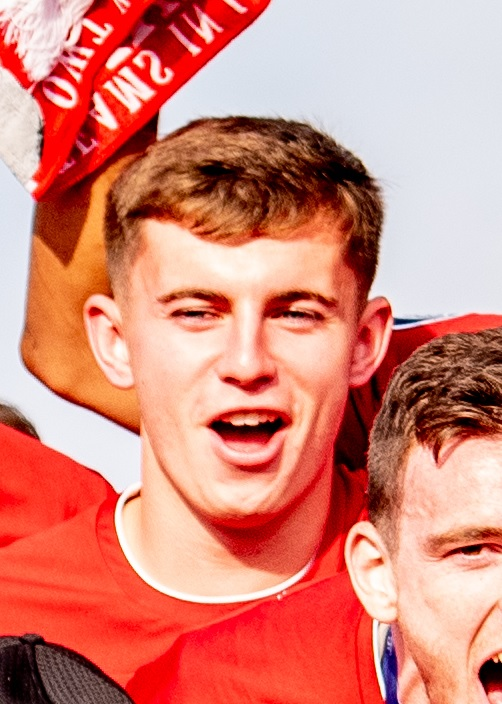
- Woodburn in 2019

Personal information
- Full name: Benjamin Luke Woodburn
- Date of birth: 15 October 1999 (age 27)
- Place of birth: Nottingham, England
- Height: 1.74 m (5 ft 9 in)
- Position: Midfielder

Team information
- Current team: Salford City
- Number: 7

Youth career
- 2007–2016: Liverpool

Senior career*
Years	Team	Apps	(Gls)
2016–2022	Liverpool	6	(0)
2018	→ Sheffield United (loan)	7	(0)
2019–2020	→ Oxford United (loan)	11	(1)
2020–2021	→ Blackpool (loan)	10	(0)
2021–2022	→ Heart of Midlothian (loan)	28	(3)
2022–2024	Preston North End	58	(1)
2024–	Salford City	62	(6)

International career^{‡}
2014	Wales U15	2	(0)
2015	Wales U16	1	(3)
2014–2016	Wales U17	8	(1)
2016–2018	Wales U19	4	(2)
2017–2021	Wales	11	(2)
- * Club domestic league appearances and goals as of 18 October 2026 (UTC) ‡ National team caps and goals as of 22:25, 11 March 2026 (UTC)

Benjamin Luke Woodburn (born 15 October 1999) is a professional footballer who plays as a midfielder for EFL League Two club Salford City. A versatile player, Woodburn can be deployed as a central midfielder, attacking midfielder, left winger or forward.

Woodburn joined the football academy of Liverpool when he was seven years old. Nearly a decade later, upon making his senior debut in 2016, he became the third-youngest player ever to play for the club and, in just his second appearance, broke Michael Owen's long-standing record to become Liverpool's youngest goalscorer. He subsequently went on loan to Sheffield United, Oxford United, Blackpool and Hearts.

Woodburn represents Wales at international level and became the nation's second youngest goalscorer behind Gareth Bale when he scored on his senior debut in 2017.

== Club career ==
=== Liverpool ===
==== Early career ====
Born in Nottingham, Nottinghamshire, Woodburn was raised in Tattenhall, Cheshire, and played both cricket and football from a young age. He joined Liverpool's academy at under-7 level where he steadily progressed through the youth ranks, leading to former academy director Frank McParland identifying him as one of the brightest prospects at the club. During his schooling, Liverpool agreed to a request from Woodburn's parents that he should stay at home rather than in Rainhill, which was closer to the academy in Kirkby. In order to facilitate his development, the club arranged for a driver to transport him every day from training back to his home in Tattenhall. When he was 15 years old, Woodburn left his high school, Bishop Heber High School and was fast-tracked from Liverpool's under-16s to the under-18s where his rapid development saw him included in Liverpool's "Futures Group", a programme which afforded the club's most talented young players a weekly opportunity to train with then first-team coach, Pep Lijnders.

==== 2016–17 season ====
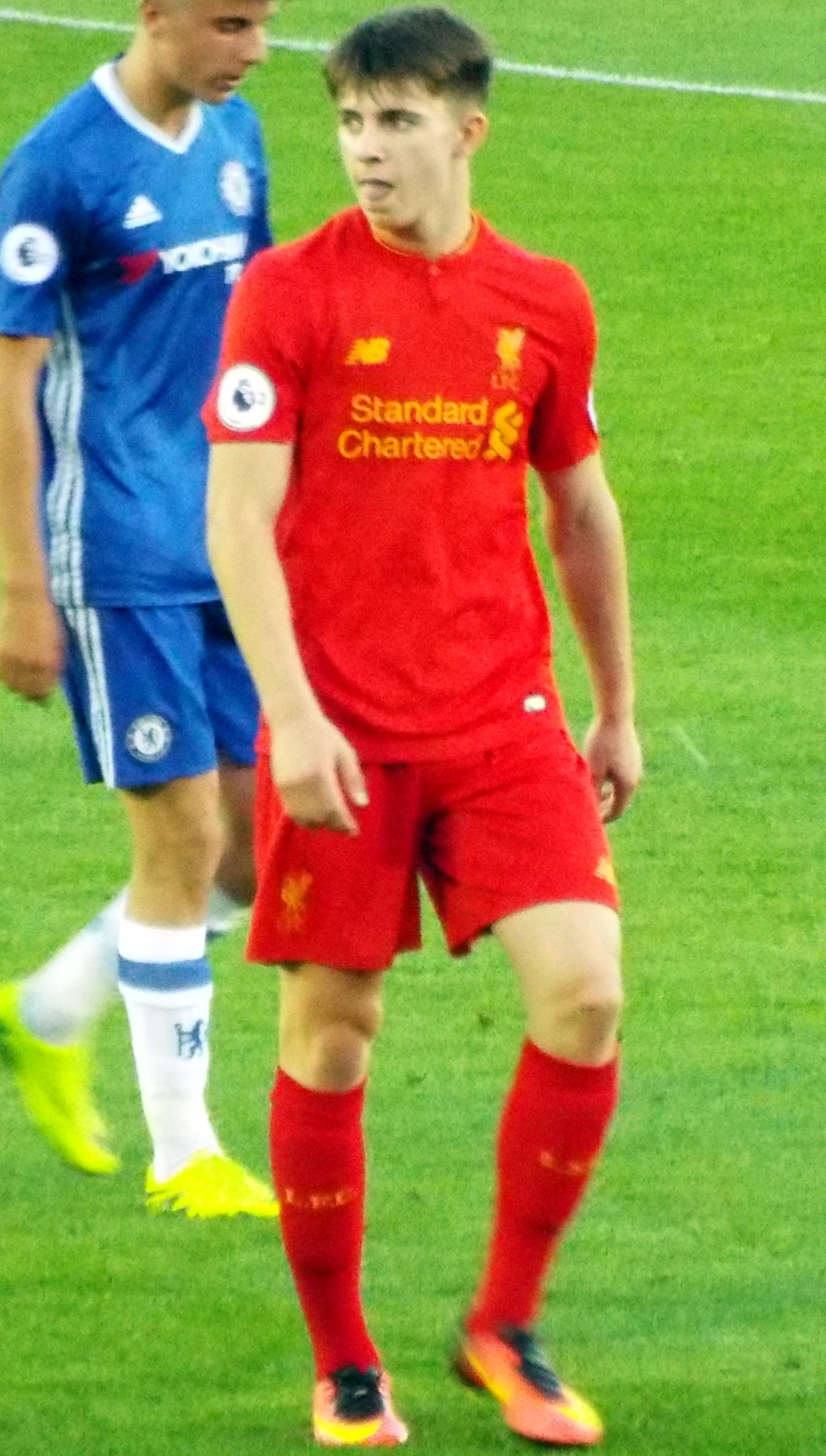
Woodburn playing for Liverpool in 2016

Having impressed first-team manager Jürgen Klopp during these training sessions, Woodburn was handed his non-competitive debut during the 2016–17 pre-season in a 1–0 win over Tranmere Rovers. He came off the bench in Liverpool's next match to score one and assist another for Roberto Firmino in a 5–0 friendly win over Fleetwood Town. Woodburn then, along with Kevin Stewart and fellow academy graduate Trent Alexander-Arnold, signed his first professional contract with Liverpool on 8 November 2016.

He made his senior debut for Liverpool on 26 November, coming on as a 92nd-minute substitute for Georginio Wijnaldum in a 2–0 Premier League victory over Sunderland. Upon doing so, Woodburn became Liverpool's third-youngest debutant of all time at the age of 17 years and 42 days, and the club's second youngest in the Premier League, behind Jack Robinson. Three days later, he became Liverpool's youngest goalscorer at the age of 17 years and 45 days when he came off the bench to score in an EFL Cup quarter-final win over Leeds United, bettering Michael Owen's record by 98 days. His record was broken in August 2025 by Rio Ngumoha.

Following his rapid development at Liverpool, both Sky Sports and The Guardian named Woodburn as one of the top young players to watch in 2017.

On 8 January 2017, he became the then-youngest player to represent the club in the FA Cup when he started in a 0–0 draw with Plymouth Argyle. His first start in the league followed on 4 April in a 2–1 away triumph over Stoke City which saw him become the third-youngest player to start for Liverpool in the Premier League era behind Owen and Jordon Ibe. The following week he was nominated for the 2017 European Golden Boy award, but was beaten by French forward Kylian Mbappé. On 9 May, Woodburn won Liverpool's Academy Player of the Season award following a campaign which saw him score eight goals in Premier League 2 and break into the first team. He was also later nominated for the Premier League 2 Player of the Season award alongside Alexander-Arnold, though the award was ultimately won by Swansea City's Oli McBurnie.

==== 2017–18 season ====
The following season, Liverpool's academy coach Steven Gerrard named Woodburn as captain of the under-19 side for the club's UEFA Youth League campaign, a competition which ran parallel to the season's UEFA Champions League. He made just one senior appearance, as a substitute, during the first half of the season but signed a new long-term deal with Liverpool in October and was named BBC Wales Young Sportsman of the Year in December.

Woodburn continued to represent the youth and reserve sides at the start of the second half of the season. On 21 February 2018, he scored once and assisted another as Liverpool beat Manchester United's U19 side 2–0 to qualify for the quarter finals of the UEFA Youth League. There, the club was eliminated by Manchester City. He made his second and only other senior appearance for the season on 13 May, coming on as a late substitute for Mohamed Salah in a 4–0 league win over Brighton. On 1 July, he and club teammates Alexander-Arnold and Herbie Kane were named on the shortlist for the 2018 Golden Boy award.

==== 2018–19 season: Loan to Sheffield United ====
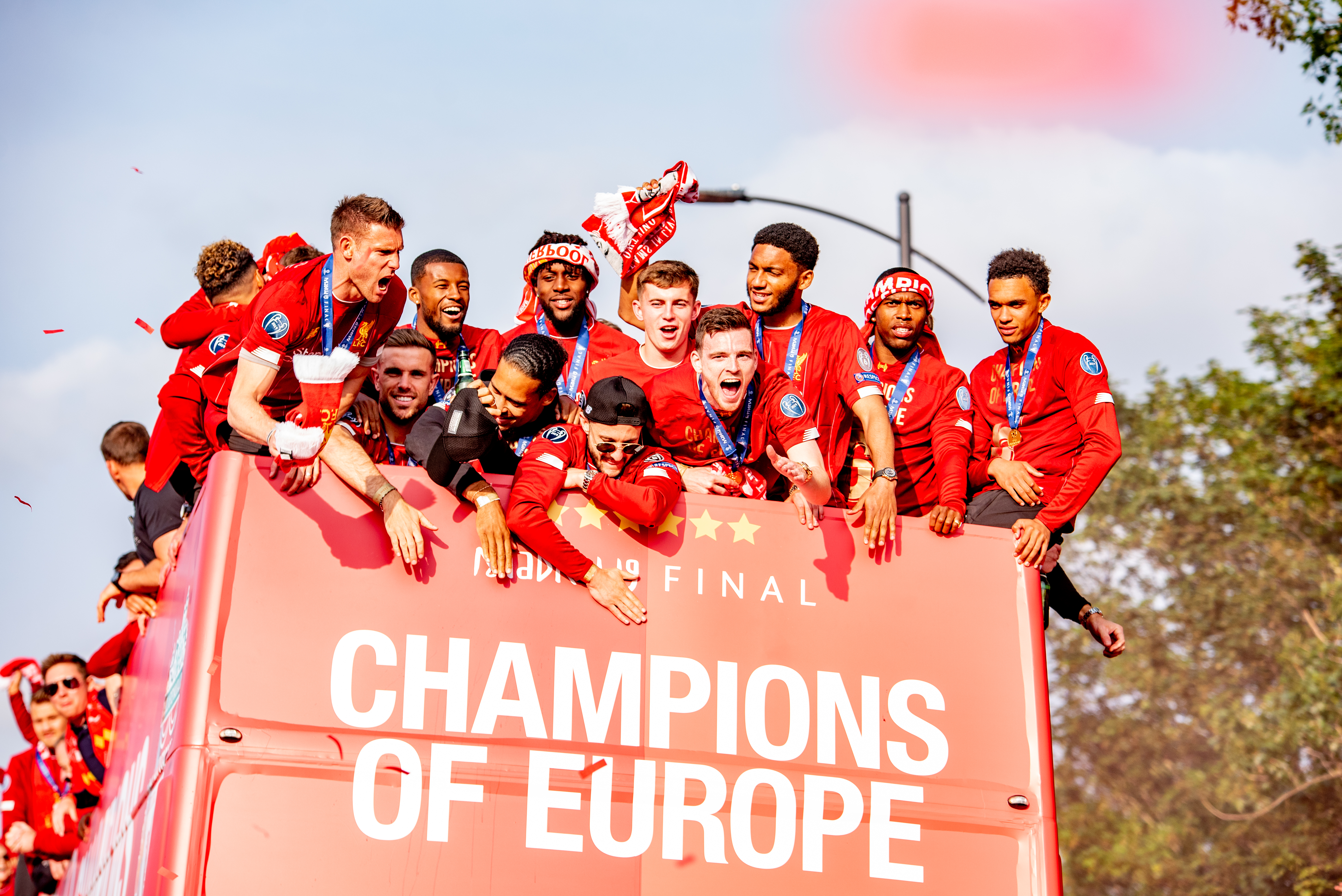
Woodburn (centre) celebrating Liverpool's 2019 UEFA Champions League triumph with his teammates

On 31 July 2018, Woodburn signed on a season-long loan with Championship side Sheffield United. He made his debut for the club four days later, coming off the bench for David McGoldrick in a 2–1 loss to Swansea. His first start followed on 14 August in a League Cup tie against Hull City where, with the scores level after regulation time, the match progressed to a penalty shootout. Woodburn converted his spot kick but Sheffield United were ultimately defeated after his former Liverpool teammate Kevin Stewart scored the winning penalty for Hull. He struggled for game time during the first half of the season, however, compounded by an ankle injury sustained in December and by the midway point of the campaign had only made eight appearances for the club.

He was subsequently recalled from his loan by Liverpool where he spent the remainder of the season, making sporadic appearances for the club's U23 side. Woodburn was also included in the side's squad for the knockout phases of the Champions League, which Liverpool went on to win after a 2–0 victory over Tottenham Hotspur in the final, although he was not included in the matchday squad.

==== 2019–20 season: Loan to Oxford United ====
On 30 July 2019, Woodburn signed with League One side Oxford United on a season-long loan. He made his Oxford debut in a 1–1 draw at Sunderland on the opening day of the 2019–20 season, and assisted Tariqe Fosu for his team's goal. On 24 August, he scored his first goal for the club, opening the scoring in a 3–1 defeat to Bristol Rovers. His campaign was once again disrupted by injury, however, after he suffered a broken bone in his foot in October which ruled him out for a number of weeks. Woodburn returned to Merseyside to recover but, on his final training session before reuniting with Oxford in December, suffered a "carbon copy" of the injury in his other foot; an injury head coach Karl Robinson later revealed stemmed from the peculiar manner in which the player bore weight on his feet.

==== 2020–21 season: Loan to Blackpool ====
On 16 October 2020, Woodburn joined Blackpool on loan until 17 January. He linked up again with the former under-23s head coach at Liverpool, now manager at Blackpool, Neil Critchley. He made his debut for the club on 20 October 2020, in a 1–0 defeat to Charlton Athletic.

==== 2021–22 season: Loan to Hearts ====
On 23 August 2021, Woodburn signed with Scottish Premiership club Heart of Midlothian on a season-long loan. He made his debut for the club on 28 August 2021, in a 2–0 win against Dundee United. He scored his first goals for the club on 6 November 2021, netting twice in a 5–2 win against Dundee United.

In June 2022, it was announced by Liverpool that he would leave the club at the end of the month when his contract expired.

=== Preston North End ===
On 4 July 2022, following the expiry of his Liverpool contract, Woodburn signed a one-year contract with Championship side Preston North End with an option for a further year. He made his debut for the club on 30 July 2022, in a 0–0 draw with Wigan Athletic. He scored his first goal for the club on 23 August 2022, in a 2–1 defeat to Wolverhampton Wanderers in the EFL Cup.

On 17 May 2024, the club announced he would be released in the summer when his contract expired.

=== Salford City ===
On 23 July 2024, Woodburn joined League Two side Salford City on a two-year contract. He made his debut for the club on 10 August 2024, in a 2–0 defeat to Port Vale. He scored his first goal for the club on 19 October 2024, in a 1–1 draw with Crewe Alexandra.

== International career ==
Until his senior international debut, Woodburn was eligible to represent both Wales, through his maternal grandfather, and England. During his early teens he attended a training camp with the England schoolboys' team and was later offered an under-16 call-up by England in August 2014. He rejected the call-up and chose to remain in the Wales setup at the time. After his club debut with Liverpool in November 2016, it was reported that England remained hopeful of convincing Woodburn to switch his international allegiance despite previously being rebuffed. The possibility was ended in September the following year when he made his senior international debut for Wales in a competitive fixture.

=== Youth ===
Woodburn has played for Wales up to U19 level and was first called up to train at one of the nation's regional development centres at Dragon Park when he was 13. He played for Wales U15s in two games against Poland in March 2014, scored a hat-trick for the U16 side against Northern Ireland the following year and then captained the U17 team against Greece in 2016. Later that year, he represented the U19 side in their UEFA European Under-19 Championship qualification matches and scored a brace in a 6–2 win over Luxembourg.

=== Senior ===
On 16 March 2017, Woodburn was called up by head coach Chris Coleman to the Wales senior team for the first time, aged 17, for the nation's World Cup qualifier against the Republic of Ireland. He remained an unused substitute, however, as Wales played out a 0–0 draw in Dublin. He made his senior debut on 2 September, coming on as a second-half substitute for Tom Lawrence and scoring a 25-yard strike in a 1–0 win against Austria. In doing so, he became Wales' second youngest goalscorer behind Gareth Bale and kept the nation within reach of qualification. He then came off the bench to set up the winning goal in the next match, a 2-0 victory over Moldova. Woodburn featured regularly from the bench towards the back end of the qualification campaign as Wales ultimately fell two points short of a play-off spot.

== Career statistics ==
=== Club ===
As of match played 21 February 2026

Appearances and goals by club, season and competition
Club	Season	League			National cup (Note: Includes FA Cup, Scottish Cup)		League cup (Note: Includes EFL Cup)		Other		Total	
Club	Season	Division	Apps	Goals	Apps	Goals	Apps	Goals	Apps	Goals	Apps	Goals
Liverpool	2016–17	Premier League	5	0	3	0	1	1	—		9	1
Liverpool	2017–18	Premier League	1	0	0	0	1	0	0	0	2	0
Liverpool	2018–19	Premier League	0	0	0	0	0	0	0	0	0	0
Liverpool	2020–21	Premier League	0	0	0	0	0	0	0	0	0	0
Liverpool	Total		6	0	3	0	2	1	0	0	11	1
Sheffield United (loan)	2018–19	Championship	7	0	0	0	1	0	—		8	0
Oxford United (loan)	2019–20	League One	11	1	0	0	2	0	3 (Note: Appearances in League One play-offs)	0	16	1
Blackpool (loan)	2020–21	League One	10	0	1	0	0	0	2 (Note: Appearances in EFL Trophy)	0	13	0
Heart of Midlothian (loan)	2021–22	Scottish Premiership	28	3	2	0	—		—		30	3
Preston North End	2022–23	Championship	38	1	2	0	2	1	—		42	2
Preston North End	2023–24	Championship	20	0	0	0	1	1	—		21	1
Preston North End	Total		58	1	2	0	3	2	0	0	63	3
Salford City	2024–25	League Two	33	3	0	0	1	0	1	0	35	3
Salford City	2025–26	League Two	21	3	3	0	1	0	2	0	27	3
Salford City	Total		54	6	3	0	2	0	3	0	62	6
Career total			174	11	11	0	10	3	8	0	203	14

=== International ===
As of match played 1 September 2021

Appearances and goals by national team and year
National team	Year	Apps	Goals
Wales	2017	6	1
Wales	2018	3	0
Wales	2019	1	1
Wales	2021	1	0
Total		11	2

As of match played 1 September 2021
Wales score listed first, score column indicates score after each Woodburn goal.

International goals by date, venue, cap, opponent, score, result and competition
No.	Date	Venue	Cap	Opponent	Score	Result	Competition
1	2 September 2017	Cardiff City Stadium, Cardiff, Wales	1	Austria	1–0	1–0	2018 FIFA World Cup qualification
2	20 March 2019	Racecourse Ground, Wrexham, Wales	10	Trinidad and Tobago	1–0	1–0	Friendly

== Honours ==
Liverpool

- UEFA Champions League: 2018–19

Wales

- China Cup runner-up: 2018

Individual

- Liverpool Academy Player of the Season: 2016–17
- BBC Wales Young Sportsman of the Year: 2017
