= Shandon Baptiste =

Grenadian footballer (born 1998)

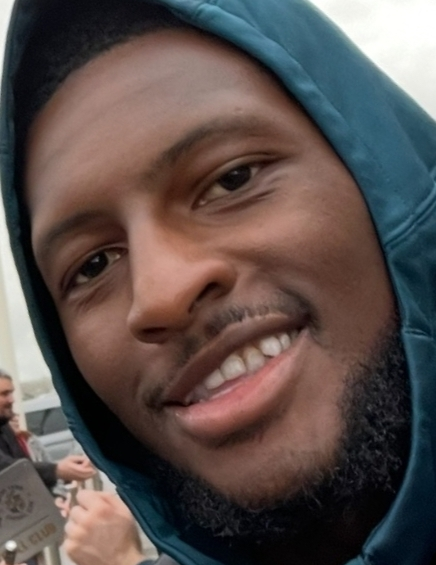
- Baptiste in 2024

Personal information
- Full name: Shandon Harkeem Baptiste
- Date of birth: 8 April 1998 (age 28)
- Place of birth: Grenada
- Height: 1.75 m (5 ft 9 in)
- Position: Midfielder

Team information
- Current team: Luton Town
- Number: 26

Youth career
- 2005–2013: Reading
- 2014–2015: JMA Reading
- 2015–2017: Oxford United

Senior career*
Years	Team	Apps	(Gls)
2017–2020	Oxford United	26	(1)
2017–2018	→ Hampton & Richmond Borough (loan)	18	(0)
2020–2024	Brentford	68	(2)
2024–	Luton Town	20	(1)

International career
2017–2018	Grenada	3	(1)
- * Club domestic league appearances and goals as of 15:43, 4 July 2026 (UTC)

Shandon Harkeem Baptiste (born 8 April 1998) is a Grenadian professional footballer who plays as a midfielder for EFL League One club Luton Town.

A product of the Reading and Oxford United academies, he began his senior career with Oxford in 2017. He transferred to Brentford in 2020. During an injury-plagued spell, Baptiste played three seasons of Premier League football and joined Luton Town in 2024. Baptiste has been capped by Grenada at international level.

== Club career ==
=== Oxford United ===
==== Early years ====
Baptiste was born in Grenada and moved to England at the age of three.

A midfielder, Baptiste began his youth career with Reading at the age of seven and deemed "too small" by the club, he was released at age 15. After a spell in park football and the John Madejski Academy, Baptiste undertook a scholarship with Oxford United in September 2015. Despite suffering two successive dislocated shoulder injuries during the 2016–17 season, he signed a six-month professional contract in May 2017, which commenced in August 2017.

Baptiste made two EFL Trophy appearances during the first half of the 2017–18 season and he signed a new 18-month contract, with the option of a further year, in December 2017. On 22 December 2017, Baptiste joined National League South club Hampton & Richmond Borough on a one-month loan, which was later extended until the end of the 2017–18 season. He made 23 appearances in a season which ended in defeat on penalties to Braintree Town in the National League South play-off Final.

==== 2018–19 season ====
Baptiste began the 2018–19 League One season as a regular in the team and scored his first senior goal in a 3–0 EFL Cup second-round victory over Newport County on 28 August 2018. After his sixth appearance of the season, he signed a four-year contract extension. Baptiste missed two months with a third shoulder dislocation and upon his return in January 2019, he suffered a season-ending anterior cruciate ligament injury during an FA Cup third round match versus Brentford. He made 14 appearances and scored one goal during the 2018–19 season.

==== 2019–20 season ====
Baptiste returned to full training in early August 2019 and was a virtual ever-present for the club through the first half of the 2019–20 season. He was heavily involved in the Us' run to the quarter-finals of the EFL Cup, scoring in a 4–0 victory over Premier League club West Ham United in the third round and captaining the team versus Manchester City in the quarter-finals. Baptiste made 27 appearances and scored four goals during the 2019–20 season, before departing the club on 31 January 2020. During 2 1/2 seasons as a professional at the Kassam Stadium, Baptiste made 43 appearances and scored five goals.

=== Brentford ===
==== 2020–2021 ====
On 31 January 2020, Baptiste transferred to Championship club Brentford for an undisclosed fee (reported to be £2.25 million, plus add-ons) and signed a 4 1/2-year contract, with the option of a further year. He made 13 appearances during what remained of the 2019–20 season, which ended with defeat in the 2020 Championship play-off final.

Baptiste began the 2020–21 season principally involved in Brentford's EFL Cup campaign, before suffering a tear to his lateral meniscus in a match versus West Bromwich Albion on 22 September 2020, which ultimately required surgery. In his absence, Brentford secured promotion to the Premier League with victory in the 2021 Championship play-off final.

==== 2021–22 season ====
Baptiste entered the 2021–22 pre-season fully fit and made his return to match play as a second-half substitute in a 1–0 friendly win over AFC Wimbledon on 17 July 2021, though an ankle injury ruled him out of the beginning of the regular season. Baptiste made his first competitive appearance in 11 months as a late substitute in a 1–1 Premier League draw with Aston Villa on 28 August 2021. 29 minutes into his fifth appearance of the season (a 2–1 victory over West Ham United on 3 October), Baptiste suffered a dislocated left shoulder, which kept him out for seven weeks. He played much of the remainder of the season in a substitute role and scored his first goal for the club in a 2–2 draw with Leeds United on 5 December. Baptiste finished the 2021–22 season with 25 appearances and one goal.

==== 2022–2024 ====
Either side of missing the middle third of the season with a groin injury, Baptiste was predominantly deployed as a substitute during the 2022–23 season. He made 24 appearances, without scoring.

Following a substitute appearance in Brentford's 2023–24 season opener, Baptiste missed three months after suffering the fourth shoulder dislocation of his career in training. On his second first team appearance after returning to fitness, Baptiste scored his first Brentford goal (three days shy of two years since his previous goal) in a 3–1 victory over Luton Town on 2 December 2023. Baptiste was released when his contract expired at the end of the 2023–24 season and he ended his 4 1/2-year Brentford career on 78 appearances and two goals.

=== Luton Town ===
On 6 July 2024, Baptiste joined Championship club Luton Town on a free transfer and signed a three-year contract. He made 17 appearances and scored one goal during an injury-ravaged 2024–25 season, in which the club was relegated to League One.

After making four appearances during the first three weeks of the 2025–26 season, Baptiste suffered a season-ending anterior cruciate ligament injury, returning to outdoor training early in the 2026–27 pre-season period. Following his first minutes played in an Under-21 fixture against Milton Keynes Dons, he was named in the first team's squad in their FA Cup fixture against Forest Green Rovers on 7 November 2026.

== International career ==
In November 2014, Baptiste was included in the English Schools' U18 squad for a development weekend at Lilleshall. Three years later and having graduated to professional football, he made three friendly appearances for Grenada during the 2017–18 season and scored one goal. Baptiste was named in the squad for four 2019–20 CONCACAF Nations League qualifying matches in September 2019, but later declined the call up, in order to maintain his potential eligibility for England.

== Style of play ==
Baptiste is a box-to-box midfielder and has been described as "energetic, great on the ball and works very hard pressing".

== Career statistics ==
=== Club ===
As of match played 2 May 2026

Appearances and goals by club, season and competition
Club	Season	League			FA Cup		EFL Cup		Other		Total	
Club	Season	Division	Apps	Goals	Apps	Goals	Apps	Goals	Apps	Goals	Apps	Goals
Oxford United	2017–18	League One	0	0	0	0	0	0	2 (Note: Appearance(s) in EFL Trophy)	0	2	0
Oxford United	2018–19	League One	9	0	1	0	3	1	1	0	14	1
Oxford United	2019–20	League One	17	1	3	1	4	1	3	1	27	4
Oxford United	Total		26	1	4	1	7	2	6	1	43	5
Hampton & Richmond Borough (loan)	2017–18	National League South	18	0	—		—		5 (Note: Three appearances in National League South play-offs, two appearances in Middlesex Senior Cup)	0	23	0
Brentford	2019–20	Championship	12	0	—		—		1 (Note: Appearance in Championship play-offs)	0	13	0
Brentford	2020–21	Championship	1	0	0	0	3	0	0	0	4	0
Brentford	2021–22	Premier League	22	1	2	0	1	0	—		25	1
Brentford	2022–23	Premier League	23	0	0	0	1	0	—		24	0
Brentford	2023–24	Premier League	10	1	2	0	0	0	—		12	1
Brentford	Total		68	2	4	0	5	0	1	0	78	2
Luton Town	2024–25	Championship	16	1	0	0	1	0	—		17	1
Luton Town	2025–26	League One	4	0	0	0	0	0	0	0	4	0
Luton Town	2026–27	League One	0	0	0	0	0	0	0	0	0	0
Luton Town	Total		20	1	0	0	1	0	0	0	21	1
Career total			132	4	8	1	13	2	12	1	165	8

=== International ===
As of match played 23 March 2018

Appearances and goals by national team and year
National team	Year	Apps	Goals
Grenada	2017	2	1
Grenada	2018	1	0
Total		3	1

Scores and results list Grenada's goal tally first, score column indicates score after each Baptiste goal.

List of international goals scored by Shandon Baptiste
No.	Date	Venue	Opponent	Score	Result	Competition	Ref.
1.	12 November 2017	Ato Boldon Stadium, Couva, Trinidad and Tobago	Trinidad and Tobago	1–0	2–2	Friendly	
