= Fabio Sole =

English footballer

Personal information
- Full name: Fabio Calogero Antonio Sole
- Date of birth: 6 September 2001 (age 25)
- Position: Midfielder

Team information
- Current team: Hendon

Youth career
- –2019: Reading
- 2019: Oxford United

Senior career*
Years	Team	Apps	(Gls)
2019–2021	Oxford United	0	(0)
2020	→ AFC Rushden & Diamonds (loan)	1	(0)
2020	→ Farnborough (loan)	3	(0)
2022	Slough Town	10	(0)
2022	→ Harley Wintney (dual registration)	3	(0)
2022–2023	Metropolitan Police	10	(1)
2023–2024	Hanwell Town	35	(0)
2024–	Hendon	0	(0)
- * Club domestic league appearances and goals as of 14:52, 16 July 2024 (UTC)

Fabio Sole (born 15 September 2001) is an English professional footballer who plays as a midfielder for Isthmian League South Central Division club Hendon.

== Career ==
On 4 September 2019, Sole joined Oxford United, having been released by Reading. Sole made his debut for Oxford on 8 October 2019 in a 2–2 draw at home to Portsmouth in the EFL Trophy. Sole converted Oxford's first penalty of the resulting penalty shootout, but Oxford went on to lose the shootout 5–4.

On 13 February 2020, Sole joined Southern League Premier Division Central side AFC Rushden & Diamonds on a one-month loan deal. He had a spell on loan at Farnborough in 2020.

He was released by Oxford at the end of the 2020–21 season.

Having spent the vast majority of the 2021–22 season out injured, Sole signed for National League South club Slough Town in July 2022 following a successful trial period. In October 2022, Sole joined Hartley Wintney on dual registration.

In June 2023, Sole joined Southern League Premier Division South side Hanwell Town.

In July 2024, Sole joined Isthmian League Premier Division side Hendon.

== Personal life ==
in January 2022 Sole co-founded Footballers Minds, a support network to help children and teenagers released by football clubs, stating that he was inspired to help people after hearing about Jeremy Wisten's death.

== Career statistics ==
As of end of 2023–24 season

Appearances and goals by club, season and competition
Club	Season	League			FA Cup		League Cup		Other		Total	
Club	Season	Division	Apps	Goals	Apps	Goals	Apps	Goals	Apps	Goals	Apps	Goals
Oxford United	2019–20	League One	0	0	0	0	0	0	1 (Note: Appearance(s) in EFL Trophy)	0	1	0
Oxford United	2020–21	League One	0	0	0	0	0	0	0	0	0	0
Oxford United	Total		0	0	0	0	0	0	1	0	1	0
AFC Rushden & Diamonds (loan)	2019–20	Southern League Premier Division Central	1	0	0	0	0	0	0	0	1	0
Farnborough (loan)	2020–21	Southern Premier Division South	2	0	0	0	—		0	0	2	0
Slough Town	2022–23	National League South	10	0	2	0	—		1 (Note: Appearance(s) in FA Trophy)	0	13	0
Hartley Wintney (loan)	2022–23	Southern Premier Division South	3	0	0	0	—		0	0	3	0
Metropolitan Police	2022–23	Southern Premier Division South	10	1	0	0	—		2 (Note: Appearance(s) in Surrey Senior Cup)	0	12	1
Hanwell Town	2023–24	Southern Premier Division South	35	0	1	0	—		0	0	36	0
Career total			61	1	3	0	0	0	4	0	68	1
