= Jeremy Wisten =

Malawian-English footballer (2002–2020)

Personal information
- Date of birth: 9 October 2002
- Place of birth: Lilongwe, Malawi
- Date of death: 24 October 2020 (aged 18)
- Place of death: Baguley, Manchester, England
- Position: Centre-back

Youth career
- Years: Team
- Altrincham
- De La Salle
- 2016–2019: Manchester City

Jeremy Wisten (9 October 2002 – 24 October 2020) was a Malawian footballer who played as a centre-back.

== Early life ==
Wisten was born in Lilongwe, Malawi, in October 2002, and moved to England the following year, settling in Trafford, Greater Manchester. He grew up supporting Manchester United.

== Club career ==
Wisten first started playing football at the Altrincham Church of England Primary School, where he stood out, before enrolling at the Wellington School in Timperley. He played for Altrincham, where he spent seven years, as well as grassroots team De La Salle before joining Premier League side Manchester City in 2016, at the age of thirteen. After joining the academy, he transferred to St Bede's College, a private school with an affiliation to Manchester City, offering a fully-funded programme for academy players to receive an education.

He suffered a serious knee injury in January 2018 while playing for Manchester City's academy, and this kept him out of footballing action for five months. Later in the same year, he was informed that he would not be selected for a scholarship with the club, and was given time to find a new club. According to academy director, Jason Wilcox, Wisten was offered nine trials with professional clubs. Wilcox also stated that Wisten's injury had no impact on the club's decision to release him. Wisten's father, Manila, claimed that the club had assured him matches would be arranged for Wisten to showcase his ability to scouts, but this did not come to fruition.

He was released by Manchester City following the expiration of his contract in June 2019. Following his release and inability to find a new club, Wisten had stopped playing football entirely when he was invited by former academy coach Mark Rees to train at the Strong Hearts Foundation, an organisation Rees had set up to help young adults get back into football. He had found a job at sports retailer JD Sports, and was working at their store in Manchester Arndale shopping centre.

== Style of play ==
A two-footed centre-back, Wisten could play anywhere in the defence, and idolised former Manchester City centre-back Vincent Kompany.

== Death and subsequent inquest ==
On 24 October 2020, Wisten was found dead in his family home in Baguley, Wythenshawe, Manchester. The following day, his former club Manchester City announced the news via their Twitter account, with current players and former teammates paying tribute.

Following his death, an inquest was launched to determine the cause. During the inquest, Manchester Area coroner, Zak Golombeck, concluded that Wisten had committed suicide by hanging on the "balance of probabilities". The question of whether Manchester City did enough to support Wisten following his release from the club was posed, and whether this contributed to his decision to take his own life, with his father claiming that Wisten had felt "let down" by the club. Following his release, and the arrangement of trials with professional sides Bolton Wanderers and Cardiff City, Wisten had asked his family to help him find an agent, something his father felt the club should have helped with. Manchester City had provided video footage of Wisten playing, in order for him to show to potential new clubs, but his father stated that it was filmed at a time when Wisten was recovering from his knee injury, and was not a good indicator of his ability.

Wisten had been unable to see his friends at the time of his death, due to COVID-19 pandemic restrictions in England, however his family stated that there was "no evidence" to suggest he had been struggling with his mental health in the days leading up to his death. He had planned to attend university to study forensic science, and had applied to a number of universities in Manchester prior to his death.

== Impact on football ==
Manchester City's sports psychologists had carried out mental health screenings for Wisten both before and after he was informed that he would be released by the club, but no concerns about his wellbeing were raised at either time. Despite this, the club launched a review into their process of releasing players, with academy director Jason Wilcox saying it would be "extremely negligent not to review our processes and try to improve wherever we can" following Wisten's death. In the wake of this review, Manchester City introduced player exit surveys, as well as creating a "parent portal" to improve communication between the club, players, and their families.

Wisten's death followed the death of Josh Lyons in 2013, a fellow footballer who had committed suicide ten years after his release from Tottenham Hotspur. It re-opened the discussion of mental health and depression in football, with former player Marvin Sordell, who had attempted to take his own life during his time as a player with Bolton Wanderers, tweeting "We have to do so much better in the world and in the football industry".

He had been close friends with fellow professional footballer Tyrhys Dolan, as the two and met while both in the Manchester City academy at the age of fourteen. Following Wisten's death, Dolan told his club, Blackburn Rovers, that he wished to use his position to promote mental health awareness, and has been vocal in his support of footballers suffering with depression and other mental health conditions.

In April 2021, then-Watford player Max Thompson founded Tape 2 Talk, a campaign designed to help raise awareness of mental health, following the death of Wisten. The following year, in January 2022, former Oxford City player Fabio Sole co-founded Footballers Minds, a support network to help children and teenagers released by football clubs, stating that he was inspired to help people after hearing about Wisten's death.
