= Nico Jones =

Irish footballer

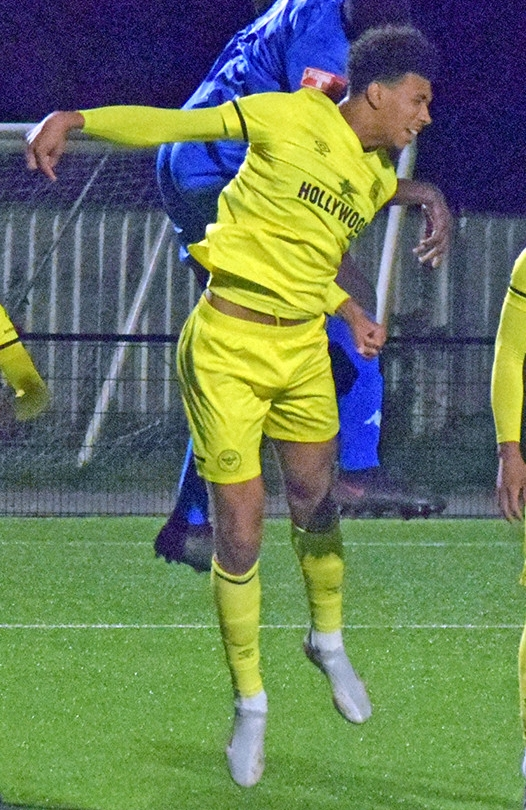
- Jones playing for Brentford B in April 2022.

Personal information
- Full name: Nico Anthony Jones
- Date of birth: 3 February 2002 (age 24)
- Place of birth: Chelsea, England
- Height: 1.91 m (6 ft 3 in)
- Position: Central defender

Team information
- Current team: Carshalton Athletic

Youth career
- 2010–2018: Fulham
- 2018–2019: Oxford United

Senior career*
Years	Team	Apps	(Gls)
2019–2021	Oxford United	3	(0)
2020	→ Oxford City (loan)	3	(0)
2021	→ Havant & Waterlooville (loan)	1	(0)
2021–2023	Brentford	0	(0)
2023	Welling United	0	(0)
2024	Dover Athletic	0	(0)
2024	Burgess Hill Town	4	(0)
2024–2026	Banbury United	60	(2)
2025	→ AFC Rushden & Diamonds (dual-reg)	3	(0)
2026–	Carshalton Athletic	1	(0)

International career
2019	Republic of Ireland U18	1	(0)
- * Club domestic league appearances and goals as of 16:42, 16 August 2026 (UTC)

Nico Anthony Jones (born 3 February 2002) is a professional footballer who plays as a central defender for Isthmian League Premier Division club Carshalton Athletic.

Jones is a product of the Fulham Academy and began his professional career with Oxford United. He transferred to Brentford B in 2021, for whom he played until his release in 2023. Thereafter, he played in non-League football. Born in England, Jones was capped by the Republic of Ireland at under-18 level.

== Club career ==
=== Early years and Oxford United ===
A central defender, Jones began his youth career in the Fulham Academy at under-9 level. After eight years with the club, he signed a scholarship deal with Oxford United in 2018. He made three first team appearances late in the 2018–19 season and signed a two-year professional contract, with the option of a further year, in June 2019. Jones made just one senior appearance during the 2019–20 season, albeit a memorable one, when he captained Oxford United to a 4–1 EFL Trophy group stage win over Crawley Town on 12 November 2019. The appearance made him the club's youngest-ever captain.

Jones was thereafter was reduced to making EFL Trophy appearances and spent time away on loan at National League South clubs Oxford City and Havant & Waterlooville during the 2019–20 and 2020–21 seasons. He was released in June 2021, after the club neglected to take up the one-year option on his contract. Jones made eight senior appearances during three seasons at the Kassam Stadium.

=== Brentford ===
On 15 August 2021, Jones transferred to the B team at Premier League club Brentford and signed two-year contract, with the option of a further year, on a free transfer. Over the course of the 2021–22 and 2022–23 seasons, he made 61 B team appearances and was a part of the 2021–22 London Senior Cup-winning squad. Jones occasionally participated in first team training during the 2021–22 season and made one mid-season friendly appearance. He was released when his contract expired in June 2023.

=== Non-League football ===
On 21 November 2023, Jones signed a short-term contract with National League South club Welling United. He made a single Kent Senior Cup appearance for the club. On 6 February 2024, Jones made a second Kent Senior Cup appearance of the 2023–24 season, for Dover Athletic. As an ineligible player, the club was thrown out of the competition for fielding him. On 1 March 2024, Jones transferred to Isthmian League South East Division club Burgess Hill Town. He made four appearances before the end of the 2023–24 season, which culminated in relegation. In June 2024, Jones transferred to Southern League Premier Division Central club Banbury United and made 66 appearances across two mid-table seasons, scoring two goals. He was released at the end of the 2025–26 season and transferred to Isthmian League Premier Division club Carshalton Athletic in August 2026.

== International career ==
Jones was called into the Republic of Ireland under-18 squad for a friendly tournament in Sweden in September 2019 and he made one appearance, in a 0–0 draw with the hosts. Jones made his only under-20 appearance with a start in a non-cap friendly versus the Republic of Ireland amateur team on 22 March 2022.

== Career statistics ==
As of match played 15 August 2026

Appearances and goals by club, season and competition
Club	Season	League			FA Cup		EFL Cup		Other		Total	
Club	Season	Division	Apps	Goals	Apps	Goals	Apps	Goals	Apps	Goals	Apps	Goals
Oxford United	2018–19	League One	3	0	0	0	0	0	0	0	3	0
Oxford United	2019–20	League One	0	0	0	0	0	0	1 (Note: Appearance(s) in EFL Trophy)	0	1	0
Oxford United	2020–21	League One	0	0	0	0	0	0	4	0	4	0
Oxford United	Total		3	0	0	0	0	0	5	0	8	0
Oxford City (loan)	2019–20	National League South	3	0	―		―		―		3	0
Havant & Waterlooville (loan)	2020–21	National League South	1	0	―		―		1 (Note: Appearance in FA Trophy)	0	2	0
Welling United	2023–24	National League South	0	0	―		―		1 (Note: Appearance in Kent Senior Cup)	0	1	0
Dover Athletic	2023–24	National League South	0	0	―		―		1	0	1	0
Burgess Hill Town	2023–24	Isthmian League South East Division	4	0	―		―		―		4	0
Banbury United	2024–25	Southern League Premier Division Central	28	0	1	0	―		2 (Note: Appearances in Oxfordshire Senior Cup)	0	31	0
Banbury United	2025–26	Southern League Premier Division Central	32	2	2	0	―		1	0	35	2
Banbury United	Total		60	2	3	0	―		3	0	66	2
AFC Rushden & Diamonds (dual-registration)	2025–26	Northern Premier League First Division Midlands	3	0	―		―		―		3	0
Carshalton Athletic	2026–27	Isthmian League Premier Division	1	0	0	0	―		0	0	1	0
Career total			75	2	3	0	0	0	11	0	89	2

== Honours ==
Brentford B

- London Senior Cup: 2021–22
