= Finlay Brennan =

English footballer

Personal information
- Full name: Finlay Michael Brennan
- Date of birth: 20 November 2001 (age 24)
- Place of birth: Luton, England
- Position: Full back

Team information
- Current team: Milton Keynes Dons
- Number: 45

Youth career
- Milton Keynes Dons

Senior career*
Years	Team	Apps	(Gls)
2019–	Milton Keynes Dons	0	(0)
2019	→ Kempston Rovers (loan)	11	(0)
- * Club domestic league appearances and goals as of 21:00, 13 December 2019 (UTC)

Finlay Michael Brennan is an English professional footballer who played as a full back for Milton Keynes Dons.

== Career ==
During the 2019–20 EFL Trophy, after progressing through the Milton Keynes Dons academy, Brennan made two appearances for MK Dons, against Fulham U21 and Wycombe Wanderers. During the 2019–20 season, Brennan was also loaned out to Kempston Rovers.

== Career statistics ==
As of 9 December 2019.

Appearances and goals by club, season and competition
Club	Season	League			FA Cup		League Cup		Other		Total	
Club	Season	Division	Apps	Goals	Apps	Goals	Apps	Goals	Apps	Goals	Apps	Goals
Milton Keynes Dons	2019–20	League One	0	0	0	0	0	0	2 (Note: Appearance(s) in EFL Trophy)	0	2	0
Career total			0	0	0	0	0	0	2	0	2	0
