= Mathias Jensen =

Danish footballer (born 1996)

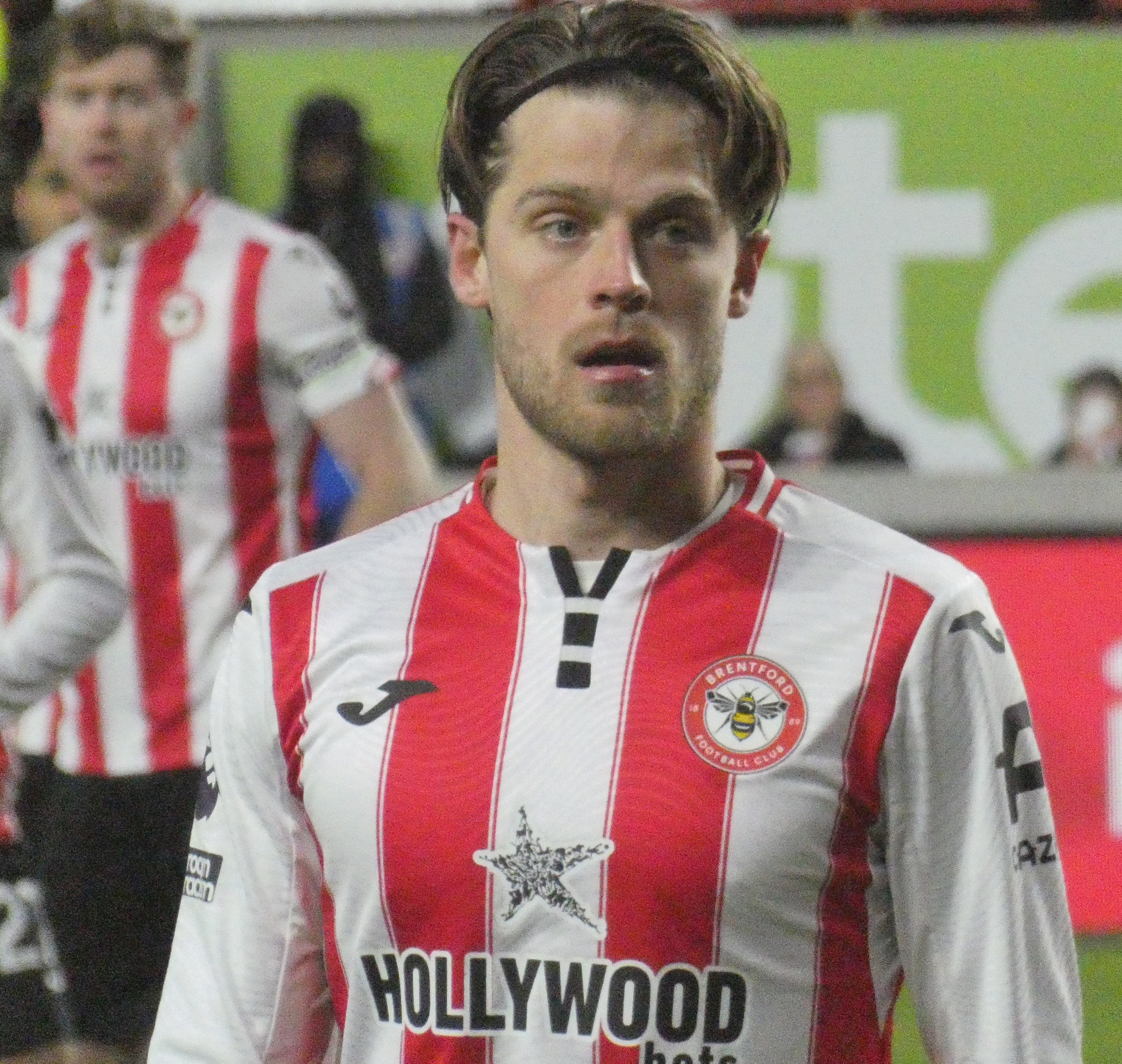
- Jensen playing for Brentford in 2025

Personal information
- Full name: Mathias Jensen
- Date of birth: 1 January 1996 (age 30)
- Place of birth: Jerslev, Zealand, Denmark
- Height: 1.80 m (5 ft 11 in)
- Position: Central midfielder

Team information
- Current team: Brentford
- Number: 8

Youth career
- 2001–2007: Hvidebæk IF
- 2007–2011: Kalundborg GB
- 2011–2015: Nordsjælland

Senior career*
| Years | Team | Apps | (Gls) |
| 2015–2018 | Nordsjælland | 63 | (15) |
| 2018–2019 | Celta Vigo | 6 | (0) |
| 2019– | Brentford | 245 | (14) |

International career^{‡}
| 2014 | Denmark U18 | 1 | (0) |
| 2014–2015 | Denmark U19 | 8 | (0) |
| 2015–2017 | Denmark U20 | 6 | (1) |
| 2017–2019 | Denmark U21 | 15 | (2) |
| 2020– | Denmark | 34 | (1) |
- * Club domestic league appearances and goals as of 19:09, 22 August 2026 (UTC) ‡ National team caps and goals as of 22:06, 17 November 2026 (UTC)

Mathias Jensen (born 1 January 1996) is a Danish professional footballer who plays as a central midfielder for Premier League club Brentford and the Denmark national team.

Jensen is a product of the Nordsjælland academy and began his senior career with the club in 2016. Following two seasons as a regular member of the team, he transferred to Celta Vigo in 2018. After an injury-hit 2018–19 season, he transferred to Brentford and was a part of the squad which was promoted to the Premier League in 2021. A former Denmark youth international, Jensen made his full international debut in 2020. He was a member of the Denmark squads at Euro 2020, the 2022 World Cup and Euro 2024.

== Club career ==
=== Nordsjælland ===
A midfielder, Jensen progressed through the academy at Nordsjælland and signed a three-year professional contract in January 2015. He was promoted into the first team squad for the 2015–16 season and made five appearances during the campaign, scoring one goal, which came in a 2–2 draw with Randers on 1 May 2016. Jensen was a regular in the 2016–17 season, making 22 appearances, before 2017–18 proved to be his breakthrough season.

He made 36 appearances, scored 12 goals, was awarded the captaincy and his achievements were recognised by the DBU and his club, with the DBU 2017 Talent of the Year and FC Nordsjælland Player of the Year awards respectively. After three early 2018–19-season appearances, Jensen departed Nordsjælland in August 2018. During just over three seasons as a professional at Farum Park, Jensen made 66 appearances and scored 15 goals.

=== Celta Vigo ===
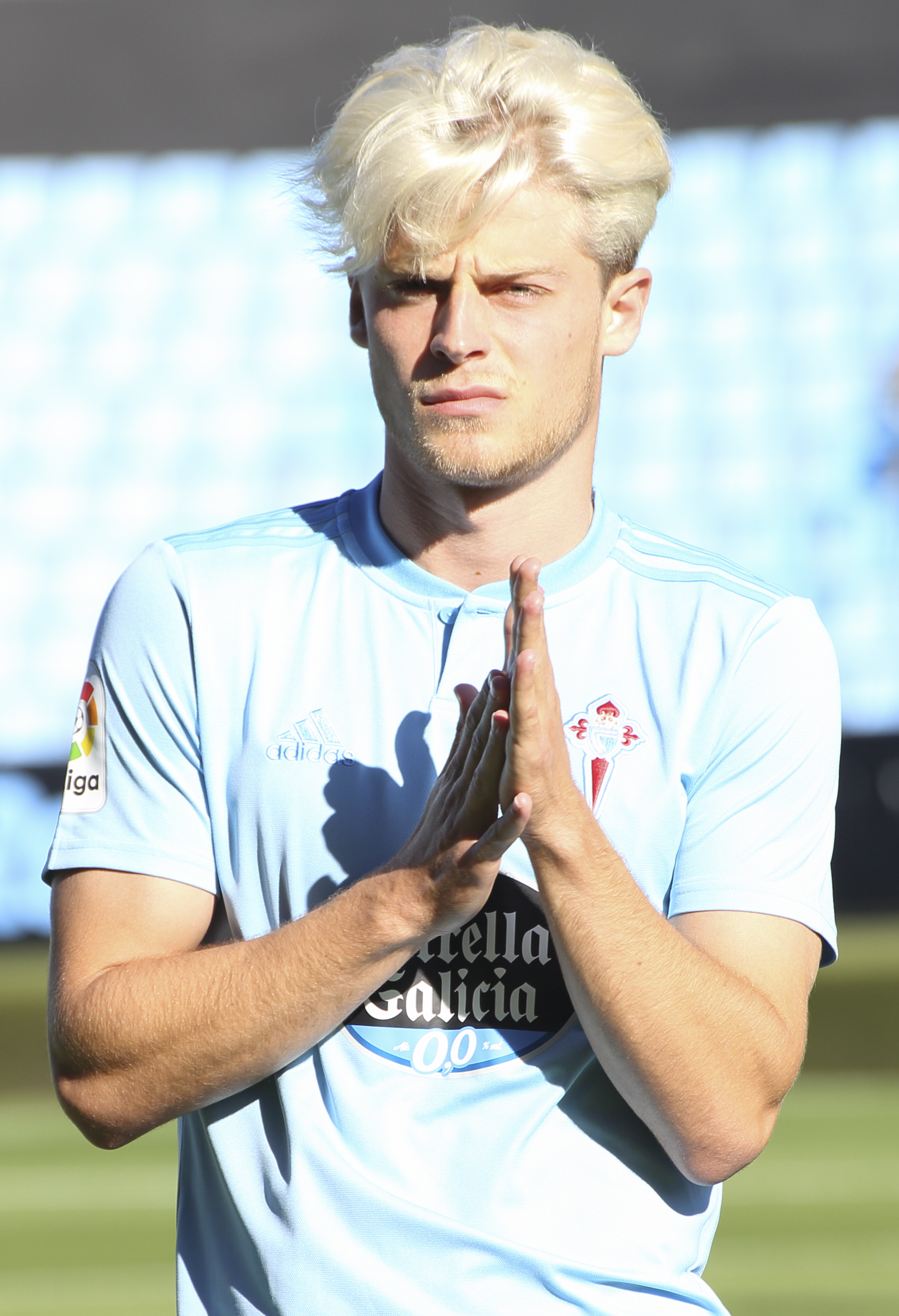
Jensen while with Celta Vigo in 2018.

On 8 August 2018, Jensen moved to Spain joining La Liga club Celta Vigo on a five-year contract. During an injury-affected 2018–19 season, he made just six appearances and left the club in July 2019.

=== Brentford ===
==== 2019–2021 ====
On 10 July 2019, Jensen moved to England signing with Championship club Brentford on a four-year contract, with the option of an additional year, for an undisclosed fee, reported to be £3.5 million. He made 43 appearances and scored one goal during the 2019–20 season, which ended with defeat in the 2020 Championship play-off final. Jensen made a career high 53 appearances during the 2020–21 season and celebrated promotion to the Premier League with victory in the 2021 Championship play-off final.

==== 2021–22 season ====
As a result of suffering a "badly gashed" foot while away on international duty, Jensen missed Brentford's entire 2021–22 pre-season and the first three matches of the regular season. Restricted to a mix of starting and substitute roles, particularly after the January 2022 signing of Christian Eriksen, Jensen made 35 appearances during a "stop-start" season. Despite being affected by COVID-19 and another minor injury, Jensen won praise from head coach Thomas Frank for training "like an animal" while sidelined.

==== 2022–23 season ====
Entering the final year of his contract, Jensen hired his own personal trainer to work with him daily during the off-season in Denmark and he returned for the 2022–23 pre-season "in incredible shape". He was challenged by head coach Thomas Frank to be the replacement for the departed Christian Eriksen. Jensen began the regular season in a starting role and as a regular set piece taker. Coaching from specialist throw-in coach Thomas Gronnemark helped length his throws. Jensen's performance and first Premier League goal in a 4–0 win over Manchester United on 13 August 2022 was recognised with the man of the match award.

On 18 January 2022, Jensen signed a new 3 1/2-year contract, with the option of a further year. Head coach Thomas Frank commended Jensen's "pressing abilities", "his defensive mindset" and stated that "he has been one of our best players so far this season". In the process of winning his 23rd cap for Denmark in a Euro 2024 qualifier versus Finland on 23 March 2023, Jensen became Brentford's most-capped international player. Until missing the final match of the season, Jensen had been an ever-present starter in league matches and had improved his goal tally to five.

==== 2023–2026 ====
Awarded the vice-captaincy and a starter when fit, Jensen made 36 appearances and scored four goals during a lower mid-table 2023–24 season. Injury and illness affected Jensen's 2024–25 season and he lost his starting place to Mikkel Damsgaard. He ended the season with 27 appearances, predominantly as a substitute.

Under new head coach Keith Andrews, Jensen began the 2025–26 season in a substitute role. He broke into the starting lineup in November 2025 and held onto a starting position for much of the remainder of the season, ending with 42 appearances and five goals. The one-year option on Jensen's contract was taken up by the club at the end of the season.

== International career ==
Jensen made 30 appearances and scored 3 goals for Denmark between U18 and U21 level. He was a part of Denmark's squads at the 2017 and 2019 European U21 Championships and captained the team in the latter tournament. Jensen was named in the senior team's preliminary 35-man squad for the 2018 World Cup, but he was not included in the final squad.

In October 2020, Jensen won a late call-up to the full Denmark squad for a series of three matches, as a replacement for injured Brentford teammate Christian Nørgaard. He made his full international debut with a start in a 4–0 friendly win over the Faroe Islands on 7 October and scored his first full international goal on his fifth cap, in a 8–0 2022 World Cup qualifying win over Moldova on 28 March 2021.

Jensen was named in the Denmark squad for Euro 2020 and he appeared as a substitute in each of the six matches during the Danes' run to the semi-final. Jensen was named in Denmark's 2022 World Cup squad and made two appearances prior to the team's group stage exit. Jensen was named in Denmark's Euro 2024 squad, but was an unused substitute in each match prior to the team's round-of-16 exit.

== Style of play ==
Jensen has been described as a "player who can dictate the game", "has a great passing ability" and "a great football brain". Midway through the 2022–23 season, he remarked that while he has "always been a technical player who doesn't really enjoy the big tackles", he had developed his "aggression" and "adapted to the tempo of the Premier League".

== Personal life ==
Jensen is a Manchester United and Barcelona supporter.

== Career statistics ==
=== Club ===
As of match played 22 August 2026

Appearances and goals by club, season and competition
| Club | Season | League | | | National cup (Note: Includes Danish Cup, Copa del Rey, FA Cup) | | League cup (Note: Includes EFL Cup) | | Europe | | Other | | Total | |
| Club | Season | Division | Apps | Goals | Apps | Goals | Apps | Goals | Apps | Goals | Apps | Goals | Apps | Goals |
|---|---|---|---|---|---|---|---|---|---|---|---|---|---|---|
| Nordsjælland | 2015–16 | Danish Superliga | 5 | 1 | 0 | 0 | ― | | ― | | ― | | 5 | 1 |
| Nordsjælland | 2016–17 | Danish Superliga | 22 | 2 | 1 | 0 | ― | | ― | | ― | | 23 | 2 |
| Nordsjælland | 2017–18 | Danish Superliga | 35 | 12 | 1 | 0 | ― | | ― | | ― | | 36 | 12 |
| Nordsjælland | 2018–19 | Danish Superliga | 1 | 0 | 1 | 0 | ― | | 1 (Note: Appearance in UEFA Europa League) | 0 | ― | | 2 | 0 |
| Nordsjælland | Total | | 63 | 15 | 3 | 0 | ― | | 1 | 0 | ― | | 67 | 15 |
| Celta Vigo | 2018–19 | La Liga | 6 | 0 | 0 | 0 | ― | | ― | | ― | | 6 | 0 |
| Brentford | 2019–20 | Championship | 39 | 1 | 0 | 0 | 1 | 0 | ― | | 3 (Note: Appearances in Championship play-offs) | 0 | 43 | 1 |
| Brentford | 2020–21 | Championship | 45 | 2 | 1 | 0 | 4 | 0 | ― | | 3 | 0 | 53 | 2 |
| Brentford | 2021–22 | Premier League | 31 | 0 | 1 | 0 | 3 | 0 | ― | | ― | | 35 | 0 |
| Brentford | 2022–23 | Premier League | 37 | 5 | 1 | 0 | 1 | 0 | ― | | ― | | 39 | 5 |
| Brentford | 2023–24 | Premier League | 32 | 3 | 2 | 0 | 2 | 1 | ― | | ― | | 36 | 4 |
| Brentford | 2024–25 | Premier League | 24 | 0 | 1 | 0 | 2 | 0 | ― | | ― | | 27 | 0 |
| Brentford | 2025–26 | Premier League | 36 | 3 | 3 | 1 | 3 | 1 | ― | | ― | | 42 | 5 |
| Brentford | 2026–27 | Premier League | 1 | 0 | 0 | 0 | 0 | 0 | ― | | ― | | 1 | 0 |
| Brentford | Total | | 245 | 14 | 9 | 1 | 16 | 2 | ― | | 6 | 0 | 276 | 17 |
| Career total | | | 314 | 29 | 12 | 1 | 16 | 2 | 1 | 0 | 6 | 0 | 349 | 32 |

=== International ===
As of match played 17 November 2026

Appearances and goals by national team and year
| National team | Year | Apps | Goals |
|---|---|---|---|
| Denmark | 2020 | 4 | 0 |
| Denmark | 2021 | 11 | 1 |
| Denmark | 2022 | 7 | 0 |
| Denmark | 2023 | 6 | 0 |
| Denmark | 2024 | 2 | 0 |
| Denmark | 2025 | 0 | 0 |
| Denmark | 2026 | 4 | 0 |
| Total | | 34 | 1 |

Scores and results list Denmark's goal tally first, score column indicates score after each Jensen goal.

List of international goals scored by Mathias Jensen
| No. | Date | Venue | Opponent | Score | Result | Competition | Ref. |
|---|---|---|---|---|---|---|---|
| 1 | 28 March 2021 | MCH Arena, Herning, Denmark | Moldova | 5–0 | 8–0 | 2022 FIFA World Cup qualification | |

== Honours ==
Brentford

- EFL Championship play-offs: 2021

Individual

- Danish Talent of the Year: 2017
- FC Nordsjælland Player of the Year: 2017–18
