= Bryan Mbeumo =

Footballer (born 1999)

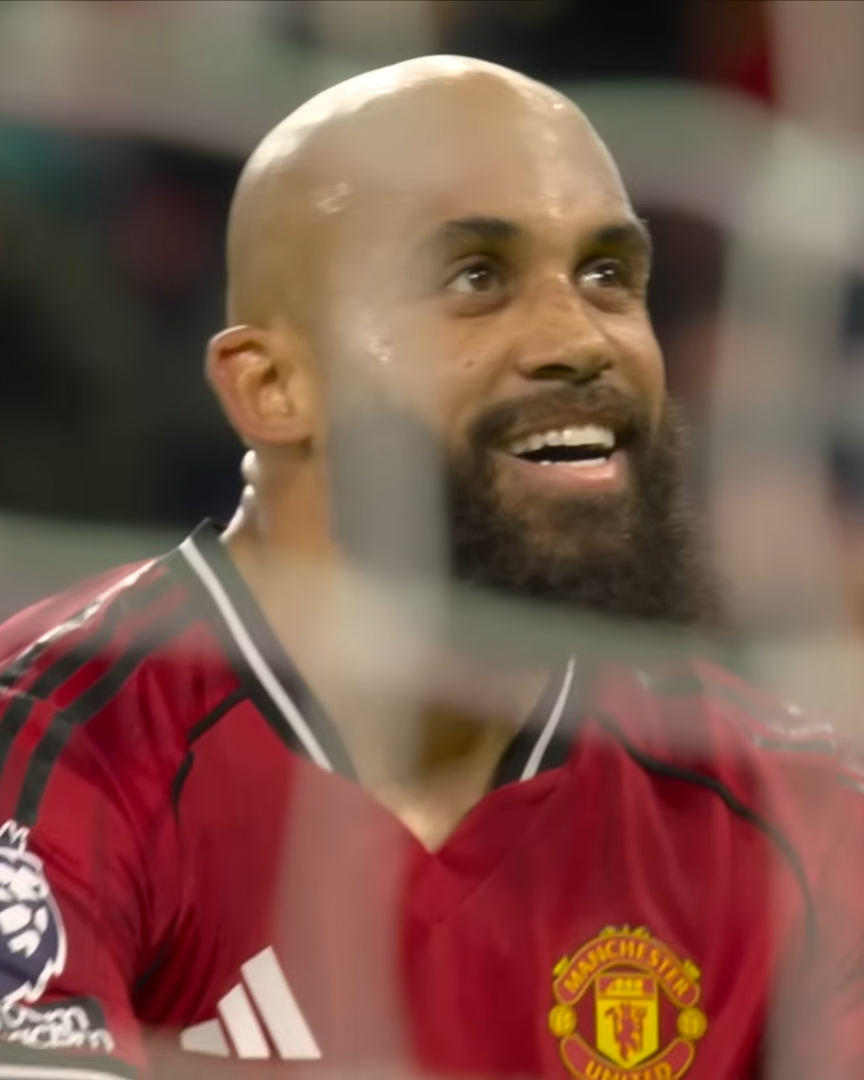
- Mbeumo with Manchester United in 2025

Personal information
- Full name: Bryan Tetsadong Marceau Mbeumo
- Date of birth: 7 August 1999 (age 27)
- Place of birth: Avallon, Yonne, France
- Height: 1.71 m (5 ft 7 in)
- Positions: Right winger; striker

Team information
- Current team: Manchester United
- Number: 19

Youth career
- 2005–2011: CO Avallonais
- 2011: Bourgoin-Jallieu
- 2012–2013: CO Avallonais
- 2013–2016: Troyes

Senior career*
Years	Team	Apps	(Gls)
2016–2018	Troyes II	33	(14)
2018–2019	Troyes	41	(11)
2019–2025	Brentford	222	(65)
2025–	Manchester United	44	(15)

International career^{‡}
2015	France U17	1	(0)
2018–2019	France U20	3	(0)
2019–2020	France U21	6	(1)
2022–	Cameroon	37	(8)
- * Club domestic league appearances and goals as of 20:40, 22 November 2026 (UTC) ‡ National team caps and goals as of 21:59, 16 November 2026 (UTC)

Bryan Tetsadong Marceau Mbeumo (French pronunciation: [mbø.mo]; born 7 August 1999) is a professional footballer who plays primarily as a right winger for Premier League club Manchester United. Born in France, he represents the Cameroon national team. He is also capable of playing as a striker or an attacking midfielder on occasion.

Mbeumo trained in the Troyes academy, and began his senior career there in 2016. He was in the club's reserve team initially. He transferred to Brentford in 2019, and was a member of their squad which gained promotion to the Premier League in 2021. After making 242 appearances for Brentford over six seasons, Mbeumo joined Manchester United in July 2025.

Although he had been capped by France at youth international level, Mbeumo decided to represent Cameroon. He made his senior international debut for them in 2022. At the end of that year, he was included in Cameroon's FIFA World Cup squad, playing in three matches.

== Early life ==
Bryan Tetsadong Marceau Mbeumo was born on 7 August 1999 in Avallon, Yonne, France.

== Club career ==
=== Troyes ===
A left-footed winger with a preference for playing on the right, Mbeumo joined Troyes at the age of 14. He graduated to the club's reserve team in the 2016–17 season. He was in the Troyes U-19 team which won the 2018 Coupe Gambardella, scoring twice in the final at the Stade de France.

Mbeumo made his senior debut for the club in a 1–0 Ligue 1 win over Metz on 17 February 2018, and made three further appearances during the 2017–18 season, which culminated in Troyes' relegation to Ligue 2. Mbeumo became a first-team regular in the 2018–19 season, making 40 appearances and scoring 11 goals. Troyes reached the Ligue 2 promotion play-off semi-finals. He departed the Stade de l'Aube in August 2019, having made 46 senior appearances, and scoring 12 goals.

=== Brentford ===
==== 2019–2021 ====
On 5 August 2019, Mbeumo moved to England to join Championship club Brentford on a five-year contract, for a club record fee of £5.8 million. He made 47 appearances and scored 16 goals in the 2019–20 season. Brentford reached the 2020 Championship play-off final, but were defeated 2–1 by Fulham. Mbeumo's performances were recognised with a nomination for the EFL Player of the Year and Young Player of the Year awards at the 2020 London Football Awards.

Mbeumo's goalscoring dropped off during the "difficult" COVID-19-affected 2020–21 season. By March 2021, however, his ten assists and four goals helped him gain another nomination for the EFL Player of the Year award, at the 2021 London Football Awards. Mbeumo finished the season with eight goals in 49 appearances, and Brentford qualified for the Premier League by winning the 2021 Championship play-off final, in which they defeated Swansea City 2–0.

==== 2021–22 season ====
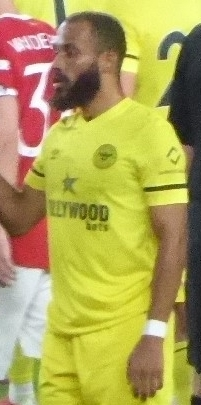
Mbeumo with Brentford in 2021

Mbeumo was deployed as a forward alongside Ivan Toney early in the 2021–22 season and by his 11th Premier League appearance, he had scored two goals and hit the woodwork seven times. Mbeumo's first hat-trick of his career (scored in a 4–1 FA Cup third round win over Port Vale on 8 January 2022) was also the first scored by a substitute in Brentford history; it earned him a place in the Team of the Round, and a nomination for Player of the Round. Three weeks later, he signed a new four-year contract, with a one-year option. Mbeumo ended the 2021–22 season with eight goals in 38 appearances; in addition, he tied with Raphinha for the record of most woodwork hits during a Premier League season, with seven.

==== 2022–23 season ====
During the 2022–23 pre-season friendlies, Mbeumo proved his versatility by at times being deployed as a wing back in a 3–4–3 formation. He made 39 appearances in all competitions, scoring 9 goals. Mbeumo's 9 goals (all scored in league matches) more than doubled that of the previous season, with head coach Thomas Frank remarking that Mbeumo "has grown more and more to be a key player for us. He works very hard on his finishing".

==== 2023–24 season ====
Starting the 2023–24 season on the right hand side of a front three alongside Yoane Wissa and Kevin Schade, Mbeumo's five goals across seven appearances in August and October 2023 saw him nominated for the Premier League Player of the Month award for each month. In the absence of the suspended Ivan Toney, he became the team's first-choice penalty taker. Mbeumo scored two further goals before missing three months after undergoing surgery on a "bad" ankle injury suffered during a 2–1 defeat to Brighton & Hove Albion on 6 December. He ended the 2023–24 season with 27 appearances and nine goals.

==== 2024–25 season ====
Following the departure of Ivan Toney and a long-term injury suffered by new forward signing Igor Thiago, Mbeumo and Yoane Wissa again led Brentford's forward line during the early months of the 2024–25 season. Good goalscoring form saw Mbeumo nominated for the Premier League Player of the Month award in August and October 2024 and January 2025. His October performances also won him a nomination for the PFA Premier League Fans' Player of the Month award. He concluded the season with 20 Premier League goals, significantly outperforming his expected goals (xG) tally of 12.3 by +7.7, the highest xG overperformance in the league.

=== Manchester United ===
On 21 July 2025, Mbeumo joined fellow Premier League club Manchester United for a reported fee of £71 million, comprising £65 million guaranteed and £6 million in potential add-ons. He signed a five-year contract with an option to extend for a further year. He was United's third signing of the summer after Matheus Cunha and Diego León. He wears the number 19 shirt for the club.On 17 August, he made his debut for the club in a 1–0 home defeat to rivals Arsenal in the league. He scored his first goal for the club in a 2–2 away draw against EFL League Two side Grimsby Town in the EFL Cup third round, before missing the decisive penalty as United lost the shootout 11–12. Mbeumo went on to score his first Premier League goal for United in the following match, a 3–2 win against Burnley at Old Trafford.

On 19 October 2025, Mbeumo scored the opening goal against rivals Liverpool after only one minute, helping United eventually win 2–1, their first victory at Anfield since 2016. The next week, Mbeumo scored a brace against Brighton & Hove Albion, securing a 4–2 victory for United. His performances in October, which also included an assist for Mason Mount against Sunderland, earned him his first Premier League Player of the Month award.

On 17 January 2026, Mbeumo played his first game back from the Africa Cup of Nations, starting in the derby against Manchester City at Old Trafford. He scored the opening goal, his first ever against City, with United winning 2–0. On 25 January, Mbeumo scored against rivals Arsenal away which contributed to United winning 3–2. He finished his debut season as the club's joint top scorer with 11 league goals and 12 goals in all competitions, level with Benjamin Šeško.

== International career ==
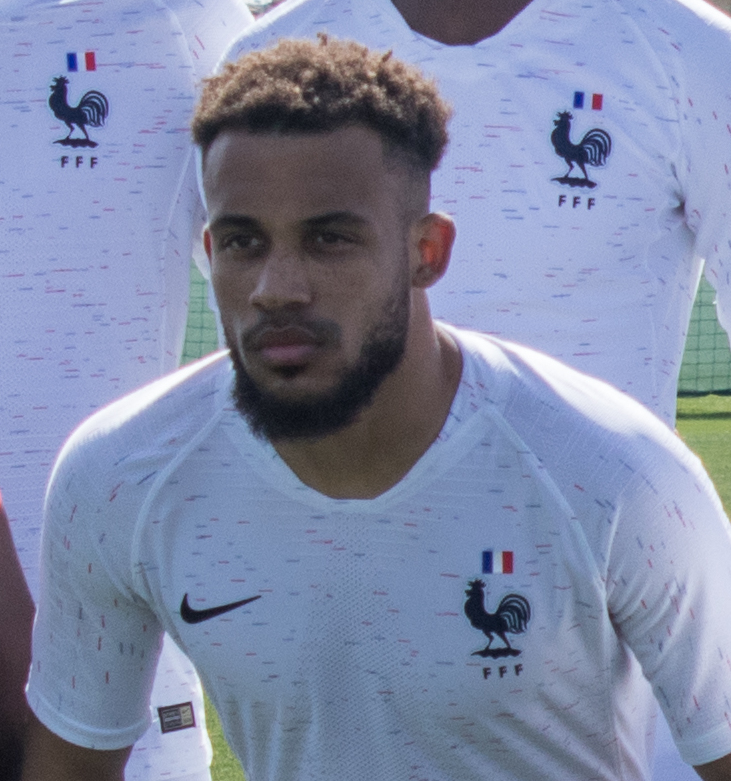
Mbeumo with France U20 in 2019

Mbeumo won 10 caps and scored one goal for France in total at under-17, under-20 and under-21 levels.

In August 2022, following a meeting in London with Samuel Eto'o, Mbeumo declared his senior international allegiance to the Cameroon national team. He made 9 appearances and scored one goal during the 2022–23 season, with three appearances coming during Cameroon's 2022 World Cup campaign, prior to the team's group stage exit. After appearing in three of Cameroon's four 2023 Africa Cup of Nations qualifying matches and scoring one goal, injury ruled Mbeumo out of the final tournament.

Mbeumo was included in the Cameroon national team squad selected by head coach David Pagou for the 2025 Africa Cup of Nations, held in Morocco. He recorded one assist in the group-stage match against Gabon, contributing to Cameroon's 1–0 victory, and featured in a 1–1 draw against Ivory Coast. He was substituted in the second half of the match against Mozambique, as Cameroon won 2–1 to advance from the group stage. Mbeumo also featured in the round of 16 match against South Africa, helping his team secure a 2–1 victory. However, Cameroon were eliminated in the quarter-finals after losing 2–0 to hosts Morocco. Mbeumo made a total of five appearances and recorded one assist in the tournament.

== Style of play ==
Mbeumo is a versatile forward who primarily operates as a right winger in a front three, often cutting inside onto his stronger left foot. He can also be played as a striker or attacking midfielder. In systems using a 3–4–2–1 formation, he typically plays as an inside forward in the right half-space, where he can exploit defensive gaps, link up with teammates, and pose a threat on goal.

Known for his pace, direct dribbling, and movement off the ball, Mbeumo excels in quick attacking transitions. He is particularly effective at carrying the ball into dangerous areas and creating high-quality chances, as reflected by his league-leading expected assists (xA) in the 2024–25 season. Despite not being a traditional striker, he also recorded the highest number of non-penalty goals over expected (npxG overperformance) during the same campaign, showcasing his clinical finishing.

== Personal life ==
Mbeumo has a Cameroonian father and a French mother.

== Career statistics ==
=== Club ===
As of match played 22 November 2026

Appearances and goals by club, season and competition
Club	Season	League			National cup (Note: Includes Coupe de France, FA Cup)		League cup (Note: Includes Coupe de la Ligue, EFL Cup)		Europe		Other		Total	
Club	Season	Division	Apps	Goals	Apps	Goals	Apps	Goals	Apps	Goals	Apps	Goals	Apps	Goals
Troyes II	2016–17	CFA 2	12	5	―		―		―		—		12	5
Troyes II	2017–18	Championnat National 3	21	9	―		―		―		—		21	9
Troyes II	Total		33	14	―		―		―		—		33	14
Troyes	2017–18	Ligue 1	4	0	0	0	0	0	―		—		4	0
Troyes	2018–19	Ligue 2	35	10	1	0	3	1	—		1 (Note: Appearance in Ligue 2 promotion play-offs)	0	40	11
Troyes	2019–20	Ligue 2	2	1	―		―		―		—		2	1
Troyes	Total		41	11	1	0	3	1	—		1	0	46	12
Brentford	2019–20	Championship	42	15	1	0	1	0	—		3 (Note: Appearances in EFL Championship play-offs)	1	47	16
Brentford	2020–21	Championship	44	8	0	0	2	0	—		3	0	49	8
Brentford	2021–22	Premier League	35	4	1	3	2	1	―		—		38	8
Brentford	2022–23	Premier League	38	9	0	0	1	0	―		—		39	9
Brentford	2023–24	Premier League	25	9	0	0	2	0	―		—		27	9
Brentford	2024–25	Premier League	38	20	1	0	3	0	―		—		42	20
Brentford	Total		222	65	3	3	11	1	—		6	1	242	70
Manchester United	2025–26	Premier League	33	11	0	0	1	1	—		—		34	12
Manchester United	2026–27	Premier League	11	4	0	0	1	0	4 (Note: Appearance in UEFA Champions League)	0	—		16	4
Manchester United	Total		44	15	0	0	2	1	4	0	—		50	16
Career total			340	105	4	3	16	3	4	0	7	1	371	112

=== International ===
As of match played 16 November 2026

Appearances and goals by national team and year
National team	Year	Apps	Goals
Cameroon	2022	6	0
Cameroon	2023	8	3
Cameroon	2024	6	2
Cameroon	2025	10	2
Cameroon	2026	7	1
Total		37	8

Scores and results list Cameroon's goal tally first, score column indicates score after each Mbeumo goal

List of international goals scored by Bryan Mbeumo
No.	Date	Venue	Opponent	Score	Result	Competition	Ref.
1	10 June 2023	Snapdragon Stadium, San Diego, United States	Mexico	1–0	2–2	Friendly	
2	12 September 2023	Roumdé Adjia Stadium, Garoua, Cameroon	Burundi	1–0	3–0	2023 Africa Cup of Nations qualification	
3	17 November 2023	Japoma Stadium, Douala, Cameroon	Mauritius	1–0	3–0	2026 FIFA World Cup qualification	
4	11 June 2024	Estádio 11 de Novembro, Luanda, Angola	Angola	1–0	1–1	2026 FIFA World Cup qualification	
5	11 October 2024	Japoma Stadium, Douala, Cameroon	Kenya	3–1	4–1	2025 Africa Cup of Nations qualification	
6	25 March 2025	Ahmadou Ahidjo Stadium, Yaoundé, Cameroon	Libya	2–0	3–1	2026 FIFA World Cup qualification	
7	8 October 2025	Côte d'Or National Sports Complex, Saint Pierre, Mauritius	Mauritius	2–0	2–0	2026 FIFA World Cup qualification	
8	24 September 2026	Roumdé Adjia Stadium, Garoua, Cameroon	Comoros	2–0	3–1	2027 Africa Cup of Nations qualification	

== Honours ==
Brentford

- EFL Championship play-offs: 2021

Individual

- Premier League Player of the Month: October 2025
- Premier League Fan Team of the Season: 2024–25
- PFA Fans' Player of the Month: October 2025
