= 2022 FIFA World Cup qualification – UEFA Group F =

The 2022 FIFA World Cup qualification UEFA Group F was one of the ten UEFA groups in the World Cup qualification tournament to decide which teams would qualify for the 2022 FIFA World Cup finals tournament in Qatar. Group F consisted of six teams: Austria, Denmark, the Faroe Islands, Israel, Moldova and Scotland. The teams played against each other home-and-away in a round-robin format.

The group winners, Denmark, qualified directly for the World Cup finals, while the runners-up, Scotland, and the fourth placed team, Austria, advanced to the second round (play-offs).

== Standings ==
Pos	Team	Pld	W	D	L	GF	GA	GD	Pts	Qualification	Denmark	Scotland	Israel	Austria	Faroe Islands	Moldova
1	Denmark	10	9	0	1	30	3	+27	27	Qualification for 2022 FIFA World Cup	—	2–0	5–0	1–0	3–1	8–0
2	Scotland	10	7	2	1	17	7	+10	23	Advance to play-offs	2–0	—	3–2	2–2	4–0	1–0
3	Israel	10	5	1	4	23	21	+2	16		0–2	1–1	—	5–2	3–2	2–1
4	Austria	10	5	1	4	19	17	+2	16	Advance to play-offs via Nations League	0–4	0–1	4–2	—	3–1	4–1
5	Faroe Islands	10	1	1	8	7	23	−16	4		0–1	0–1	0–4	0–2	—	2–1
6	Moldova	10	0	1	9	5	30	−25	1		0–4	0–2	1–4	0–2	1–1	—

Source: FIFA, UEFA
Rules for classification: Tiebreakers

== Matches ==
The fixture list was confirmed by UEFA on 8 December 2020, the day following the draw. Times are CET/CEST, (Note: CET (UTC+1) for matches until 27 March and from 31 October (matchday 1 and 9–10), and CEST (UTC+2) for matches from 28 March to 30 October 2021 (matchday 2–8).) as listed by UEFA (local times, if different, are in parentheses).

25 March 2021
18:00 (19:00 UTC+2)

Israel	0–2	Denmark
	Report (FIFA); Report (UEFA)	Braithwaite 13'; Wind 67'

Bloomfield Stadium, Tel Aviv
Attendance: 5,000 (Note: The Israeli authorities have allowed the attendance of audiences at football matches (up to 5,000 seats), thanks to over 50% of Israel's population who have been fully vaccinated for COVID-19 by then.)
Referee: Craig Pawson (England)
25 March 2021
20:45 (21:45 UTC+2)

Moldova	1–1	Faroe Islands
Nicolaescu 9'	Report (FIFA); Report (UEFA)	M. Olsen 83'

Zimbru Stadium, Chișinău
Attendance: 0 (Note: Due to the COVID-19 pandemic in Europe, the match was played behind closed doors.)
Referee: Iwan Arwel Griffith (Wales)
25 March 2021
20:45 (19:45 UTC±0)

Scotland	2–2	Austria
Hanley 71'; J. McGinn 85'	Report (FIFA); Report (UEFA)	Kalajdžić 55', 80'

Hampden Park, Glasgow
Attendance: 0
Referee: Carlos del Cerro Grande (Spain)

28 March 2021
18:00

Denmark	8–0	Moldova
Dolberg 19' (pen.), 48'; Damsgaard 22', 29'; Stryger Larsen 35'; Jensen 39'; Skov 81'; Ingvartsen 89'	Report (FIFA); Report (UEFA)

MCH Arena, Herning
Attendance: 0
Referee: Aliyar Aghayev (Azerbaijan)
28 March 2021
20:45

Austria	3–1	Faroe Islands
Dragović 30'; Baumgartner 37'; Kalajdžić 44'	Report (FIFA); Report (UEFA)	Nattestad 19'

Ernst-Happel-Stadion, Vienna
Attendance: 0
Referee: Kateryna Monzul (Ukraine)
28 March 2021
20:45 (21:45 UTC+3)

Israel	1–1	Scotland
Peretz 44'	Report (FIFA); Report (UEFA)	Fraser 56'

Bloomfield Stadium, Tel Aviv
Attendance: 5,000
Referee: Deniz Aytekin (Germany)

31 March 2021
20:45

Austria	0–4	Denmark
	Report (FIFA); Report (UEFA)	Skov Olsen 58', 74'; Mæhle 63'; Højbjerg 67'

Ernst-Happel-Stadion, Vienna
Attendance: 0
Referee: Artur Soares Dias (Portugal)
31 March 2021
20:45 (21:45 UTC+3)

Moldova	1–4	Israel
Carp 29'	Report (FIFA); Report (UEFA)	Zahavi 45+2'; Solomon 57'; Dabbur 64'; Natkho 66'

Zimbru Stadium, Chișinău
Attendance: 0
Referee: Bojan Pandžić (Sweden)
31 March 2021
20:45 (19:45 UTC+1)

Scotland	4–0	Faroe Islands
J. McGinn 7', 53'; Adams 60'; Fraser 70'	Report (FIFA); Report (UEFA)

Hampden Park, Glasgow
Attendance: 0
Referee: Trustin Farrugia Cann (Malta)

1 September 2021
20:45

Denmark	2–0	Scotland
Wass 14'; Mæhle 15'	Report (FIFA); Report (UEFA)

Parken, Copenhagen
Attendance: 34,562
Referee: Ovidiu Hațegan (Romania)
1 September 2021
20:45 (21:45 UTC+3)

Faroe Islands	0–4	Israel
	Report (FIFA); Report (UEFA)	Zahavi 12', 44', 90+2'; Dabbur 52'

Tórsvøllur, Tórshavn
Attendance: 2,666
Referee: Dennis Higler (Netherlands)
1 September 2021
21:15 (22:15 UTC+3) (Note: The Moldova v Austria match, originally to be played at 21:45 UTC+3, was delayed by 30 minutes because a drone invaded the pitch.)

Moldova	0–2	Austria
	Report (FIFA); Report (UEFA)	Baumgartner 45+1'; Arnautović 90+4'

Zimbru Stadium, Chișinău
Attendance: 3,945
Referee: Paul Tierney (England)

4 September 2021
20:45 (19:45 UTC+1)

Faroe Islands	0–1	Denmark
	Report (FIFA); Report (UEFA)	Wind 85'

Tórsvøllur, Tórshavn
Attendance: 4,620
Referee: Fran Jović (Croatia)
4 September 2021
20:45 (21:45 UTC+3)

Israel	5–2	Austria
Solomon 5'; Dabbur 20'; Zahavi 33', 90'; Weissman 59'	Report (FIFA); Report (UEFA)	Baumgartner 42'; Arnautović 55'

Sammy Ofer Stadium, Haifa
Attendance: 13,550
Referee: Felix Zwayer (Germany)
4 September 2021
20:45 (19:45 UTC+1)

Scotland	1–0	Moldova
Dykes 14'	Report (FIFA); Report (UEFA)

Hampden Park, Glasgow
Attendance: 40,869
Referee: Lawrence Visser (Belgium)

7 September 2021
20:45

Austria	0–1	Scotland
	Report (FIFA); Report (UEFA)	Dykes 30' (pen.)

Ernst-Happel-Stadion, Vienna
Attendance: 18,800
Referee: Georgi Kabakov (Bulgaria)
7 September 2021
20:45 (21:45 UTC+3)

Denmark	5–0	Israel
Poulsen 28'; Kjær 31'; Skov Olsen 41'; Delaney 58'; Cornelius 90+1'	Report (FIFA); Report (UEFA)

Parken, Copenhagen
Attendance: 35,158
Referee: Tobias Stieler (Germany)
7 September 2021
20:45 (19:45 UTC+1)

Faroe Islands	2–1	Moldova
K. Olsen 68'; Vatnsdal 72'	Report (FIFA); Report (UEFA)	Milinceanu 84'

Tórsvøllur, Tórshavn
Attendance: 2,714
Referee: Ricardo de Burgos (Spain)

9 October 2021
18:00 (17:00 UTC+1)

Scotland	3–2	Israel
J. McGinn 30'; Dykes 57'; McTominay 90+4'	Report (FIFA); Report (UEFA)	Zahavi 5'; Dabbur 32'

Hampden Park, Glasgow
Attendance: 50,585
Referee: Szymon Marciniak (Poland)
9 October 2021
20:45 (19:45 UTC+1)

Faroe Islands	0–2	Austria
	Report (FIFA); Report (UEFA)	Laimer 26'; Sabitzer 48'

Tórsvøllur, Tórshavn
Attendance: 3,021
Referee: Irfan Peljto (Bosnia and Herzegovina)
9 October 2021
20:45 (21:45 UTC+3)

Moldova	0–4	Denmark
	Report (FIFA); Report (UEFA)	Skov Olsen 23'; Kjær 34' (pen.); Nørgaard 39'; Mæhle 44'

Zimbru Stadium, Chișinău
Attendance: 2,642
Referee: João Pinheiro (Portugal)

12 October 2021
20:45

Denmark	1–0	Austria
Mæhle 53'	Report (FIFA); Report (UEFA)

Parken, Copenhagen
Attendance: 35,843
Referee: Ivan Kružliak (Slovakia)
12 October 2021
20:45 (19:45 UTC+1)

Faroe Islands	0–1	Scotland
	Report (FIFA); Report (UEFA)	Dykes 86'

Tórsvøllur, Tórshavn
Attendance: 4,233
Referee: Matej Jug (Slovenia)
12 October 2021
21:45 (21:45 UTC+3)

Israel	2–1	Moldova
Zahavi 28'; Dabbur 49'	Report (FIFA); Report (UEFA)	Nicolaescu 90+4'

Turner Stadium, Be'er Sheva
Attendance: 9,000
Referee: Andris Treimanis (Latvia)

12 November 2021
18:00 (19:00 UTC+2)

Moldova	0–2	Scotland
	Report (FIFA); Report (UEFA)	Patterson 38'; Adams 65'

Zimbru Stadium, Chișinău
Attendance: 3,642
Referee: Srđan Jovanović (Serbia)
12 November 2021
20:45 (21:45 UTC+2)

Austria	4–2	Israel
Arnautović 51' (pen.); Schaub 62', 72'; Sabitzer 84'	Report (FIFA); Report (UEFA)	Bitton 33'; Peretz 59'

Wörthersee Stadion, Klagenfurt
Attendance: 4,300
Referee: Ovidiu Hațegan (Romania)
12 November 2021
20:45

Denmark	3–1	Faroe Islands
Skov Olsen 18'; Bruun Larsen 63'; Mæhle 90+3'	Report (FIFA); Report (UEFA)	K. Olsen 89'

Parken, Copenhagen
Attendance: 35,531
Referee: Radu Petrescu (Romania)

15 November 2021
20:45 (21:45 UTC+2)

Austria	4–1	Moldova
Arnautović 4', 55' (pen.); Trimmel 22'; Ljubičić 83'	Report (FIFA); Report (UEFA)	Nicolaescu 60'

Wörthersee Stadion, Klagenfurt
Attendance: 1,800
Referee: Aleksandar Stavrev (North Macedonia)
15 November 2021
19:45 (21:45 UTC+2)

Israel	3–2	Faroe Islands
Dabbur 30' (pen.); Weissman 58'; Peretz 74'	Report (FIFA); Report (UEFA)	Vatnhamar 62'; K. Olsen 72'

Netanya Stadium, Netanya
Attendance: 6,800
Referee: Jérôme Brisard (France)
15 November 2021
20:45 (19:45 UTC±0)

Scotland	2–0	Denmark
Souttar 35'; Adams 86'	Report (FIFA); Report (UEFA)

Hampden Park, Glasgow
Attendance: 49,527
Referee: Alejandro Hernández Hernández (Spain)

== Goalscorers ==
There were 101 goals scored in 30 matches, for an average of 3.37 goals per match.

8 goals

- (Israel) Eran Zahavi

6 goals

- (Israel) Mu'nas Dabbur

5 goals

- (Austria) Marko Arnautović
- (Denmark) Joakim Mæhle
- (Denmark) Andreas Skov Olsen

4 goals

- (Scotland) Lyndon Dykes
- (Scotland) John McGinn

3 goals

- (Austria) Christoph Baumgartner
- (Austria) Saša Kalajdžić
- (Faroe Islands) Klæmint Olsen
- (Israel) Dor Peretz
- (Moldova) Ion Nicolaescu
- (Scotland) Ché Adams

2 goals

- (Austria) Marcel Sabitzer
- (Austria) Louis Schaub
- (Denmark) Mikkel Damsgaard
- (Denmark) Kasper Dolberg
- (Denmark) Simon Kjær
- (Denmark) Jonas Wind
- (Israel) Manor Solomon
- (Israel) Shon Weissman
- (Scotland) Ryan Fraser

1 goal

- (Austria) Aleksandar Dragović
- (Austria) Konrad Laimer
- (Austria) Dejan Ljubicic
- (Austria) Christopher Trimmel
- (Denmark) Martin Braithwaite
- (Denmark) Jacob Bruun Larsen
- (Denmark) Andreas Cornelius
- (Denmark) Thomas Delaney
- (Denmark) Pierre-Emile Højbjerg
- (Denmark) Marcus Ingvartsen
- (Denmark) Mathias Jensen
- (Denmark) Christian Nørgaard
- (Denmark) Yussuf Poulsen
- (Denmark) Robert Skov
- (Denmark) Jens Stryger Larsen
- (Denmark) Daniel Wass
- (Faroe Islands) Sonni Nattestad
- (Faroe Islands) Meinhard Olsen
- (Faroe Islands) Sølvi Vatnhamar
- (Faroe Islands) Heini Vatnsdal
- (Israel) Nir Bitton
- (Israel) Bibras Natkho
- (Moldova) Cătălin Carp
- (Moldova) Nicolae Milinceanu
- (Scotland) Grant Hanley
- (Scotland) Scott McTominay
- (Scotland) Nathan Patterson
- (Scotland) John Souttar

== Discipline ==
A player was automatically suspended for the next match for the following offences:

- Receiving a red card (red card suspensions could be extended for serious offences)
- Receiving two yellow cards in two different matches (yellow card suspensions were carried forward to the play-offs, but not the finals or any other future international matches)

The following suspensions were served during the qualifying matches:

Team	Player	Offence(s)	Suspended for match(es)
Austria	Florian Grillitsch	(yellow card) vs Scotland (25 March 2021); (yellow card) vs Faroe Islands (28 March 2021)	vs Denmark (31 March 2021)
Austria	Martin Hinteregger	(yellow card) vs Scotland (7 September 2021); (yellow card) vs Israel (12 November 2021)	vs Moldova (15 November 2021)
Denmark	Christian Nørgaard	(yellow card) vs Israel (7 September 2021); (yellow card) vs Faroe Islands (12 November 2021)	vs Scotland (15 November 2021)
Faroe Islands	Brandur Hendriksson	(yellow card) vs Austria (28 March 2021); (yellow card) vs Scotland (12 October 2021)	vs Denmark (12 November 2021)
Faroe Islands	René Joensen	(yellow card) (yellow-red card) vs Denmark (4 September 2021)	vs Moldova (7 September 2021)
Faroe Islands	René Joensen	(yellow card) vs Israel (1 September 2021); (yellow card) vs Austria (9 October 2021)	vs Scotland (12 October 2021)
Faroe Islands	Gunnar Vatnhamar	(yellow card) vs Moldova (25 March 2021); (yellow card) vs Denmark (12 November 2021)	vs Israel (15 November 2021)
Israel	Hatem Abd Elhamed	(yellow card) vs Austria (4 September 2021); (yellow card) vs Denmark (7 September 2021)	vs Scotland (9 October 2021)
Moldova	Igor Armaș	(yellow card) vs Faroe Islands (25 March 2021); (yellow card) vs Israel (31 March 2021)	vs Austria (1 September 2021)
Moldova	Cătălin Carp	(yellow card) vs Denmark (28 March 2021); (yellow card) vs Israel (31 March 2021)	vs Austria (1 September 2021)
Moldova	Artur Ioniță	(yellow card) vs Faroe Islands (25 March 2021); (yellow card) vs Scotland (4 September 2021)	vs Faroe Islands (7 September 2021)
Moldova	Denis Marandici	(yellow card) vs Denmark (9 October 2021); (yellow card) vs Scotland (12 November 2021)	vs Austria (15 November 2021)
Moldova	Ion Nicolaescu	(red card) vs Israel (31 March 2021)	vs Austria (1 September 2021) vs Scotland (4 September 2021)
Moldova	Vadim Raţă	(yellow card) vs Faroe Islands (25 March 2021); (yellow card) vs Israel (31 March 2021)	vs Austria (1 September 2021)
Moldova	Vadim Raţă	(yellow card) vs Israel (12 October 2021); (yellow card) vs Scotland (12 November 2021)	vs Austria (15 November 2021)
Moldova	Oleg Reabciuk	(yellow card) vs Austria (1 September 2021); (yellow card) vs Faroe Islands (7 September 2021)	vs Denmark (9 October 2021)
Moldova	Oleg Reabciuk	(yellow card) (yellow-red card) vs Israel (12 October 2021)	vs Scotland (12 November 2021)
Scotland	Ryan Christie	(yellow card) vs Austria (25 March 2021); (yellow card) vs Faroe Islands (12 October 2021)	vs Moldova (12 November 2021)
Scotland	Lyndon Dykes	(yellow card) vs Austria (25 March 2021); (yellow card) vs Faroe Islands (12 October 2021)	vs Moldova (12 November 2021)
Scotland	Grant Hanley	(yellow card) vs Austria (25 March 2021); (yellow card) vs Austria (7 September 2021)	vs Israel (9 October 2021)
Scotland	Nathan Patterson	(yellow card) vs Israel (9 October 2021); (yellow card) vs Moldova (12 November 2021)	vs Denmark (15 November 2021)
