= 2024–25 Brentford F.C. season =

English football team season

Brentford
2024–25 season
- Owner: Matthew Benham
- Chairman: Cliff Crown
- Head coach: Thomas Frank
- Stadium: Brentford Community Stadium
- Premier League: 10th
- FA Cup: Third round
- EFL Cup: Quarter-finals
- Top goalscorer: League: Bryan Mbeumo (20); All: Bryan Mbeumo; Yoane Wissa (20 each)
- Highest home attendance: 17,215
- Lowest home attendance: 16,955
- Average home league attendance: 17,094
- Biggest win: 5–0 v Southampton (A) (4 January 2025, Premier League)
- Biggest defeat: List: 0–2 v Liverpool (A) (25 August 2024, Premier League) 1–3 v Tottenham Hotspur (A) (21 September 2024, Premier League) 1–3 v Aston Villa (A) (4 December 2024, Premier League) 1–3 v Newcastle United (A) (18 December 2024, EFL Cup) 0–2 v Nottingham Forest (H) (21 December 2024, Premier League) 1–3 v Arsenal (H) (1 January 2025, Premier League) 0–2 v Tottenham Hotspur (H) (2 February 2025, Premier League)
Home colours	Away colours	Third colours

The 2024–25 season was the 135th season in the history of Brentford Football Club, and the club's fourth consecutive season in the Premier League. In addition to the domestic league, the club participated in the FA Cup and the EFL Cup.

== First team squad ==
Players' ages are as of the opening day of the 2024–25 season.

No.	Player	Nationality	Position	Date of birth (age)	Signed from	Signed in	Notes
Goalkeepers
1	Mark Flekken	(Netherlands)	GK	13 June 1993 (aged 31)	SC Freiburg	2023	
12	Hákon Valdimarsson	(Iceland)	GK	13 October 2001 (aged 22)	Elfsborg	2024	
13	Matthew Cox	(England)	GK	2 May 2003 (aged 21)	AFC Wimbledon	2021	Loaned to Crawley Town
41	Julian Eyestone	(United States)	GK	21 April 2006 (aged 18)	Unattached	2024	
—	Ellery Balcombe	(England)	GK	15 October 1999 (aged 24)	Academy	2016	Loaned to St Mirren and Motherwell
―	Ben Winterbottom	(England)	GK	16 March 2001 (aged 23)	Liverpool	2021	Loaned to AFC Fylde
Defenders
2	Aaron Hickey	(Scotland)	RB	10 June 2002 (aged 22)	Bologna	2022	
3	Rico Henry	(Jamaica)	LB	8 July 1997 (aged 27)	Walsall	2016	
4	Sepp van den Berg	(Netherlands)	CB / RB	20 December 2001 (aged 22)	Liverpool	2024	
5	Ethan Pinnock	(Jamaica)	CB	29 May 1993 (aged 31)	Barnsley	2019	
16	Ben Mee	(England)	CB	21 September 1989 (aged 34)	Burnley	2022	
20	Kristoffer Ajer	(Norway)	CB / RB	17 April 1998 (aged 26)	Celtic	2021	
21	Jayden Meghoma	(England)	LB	28 June 2006 (aged 18)	Southampton	2024	Loaned to Preston North End
22	Nathan Collins	(Republic of Ireland)	CB	30 April 2001 (aged 23)	Wolverhampton Wanderers	2023	
23	Keane Lewis-Potter	(England)	LB / LW	22 February 2001 (aged 23)	Hull City	2022	
30	Mads Roerslev	(Denmark)	RB	24 June 1999 (aged 25)	Copenhagen	2019	Loaned to VfL Wolfsburg
33	Michael Kayode	(Italy)	RB	10 July 2004 (aged 20)	Fiorentina	2025	On loan from Fiorentina
36	Kim Ji-soo	(South Korea)	CB	24 December 2004 (aged 19)	Seongnam	2023	
43	Benjamin Arthur	(England)	CB	9 October 2005 (aged 18)	Peterborough United	2023	
44	Benjamin Fredrick	(Nigeria)	RB	28 May 2005 (aged 19)	Simoiben	2023	
Midfielders
6	Christian Nørgaard (c)	(Denmark)	DM	10 March 1994 (aged 30)	Fiorentina	2019	
8	Mathias Jensen	(Denmark)	CM	1 January 1996 (aged 28)	Celta Vigo	2019	
10	Josh Dasilva	(England)	AM	23 October 1998 (aged 25)	Arsenal	2018	
14	Fábio Carvalho	(Portugal)	AM	30 August 2002 (aged 21)	Liverpool	2024	
15	Frank Onyeka	(Nigeria)	DM	1 January 1998 (aged 26)	Midtjylland	2021	Loaned to FC Augsburg
18	Yehor Yarmolyuk	(Ukraine)	CM	1 March 2004 (aged 20)	Dnipro-1	2022	
24	Mikkel Damsgaard	(Denmark)	AM	3 July 2000 (aged 24)	Sampdoria	2022	
25	Myles Peart-Harris	(England)	AM	18 September 2002 (aged 21)	Chelsea	2021	Loaned to Swansea City
26	Yunus Emre Konak	(Turkey)	DM	10 January 2006 (aged 18)	Sivasspor	2024	
27	Vitaly Janelt	(Germany)	DM	10 May 1998 (aged 26)	VfL Bochum	2020	
28	Ryan Trevitt	(England)	MF	12 March 2003 (aged 21)	Leatherhead Youth	2021	Loaned to Exeter City
32	Paris Maghoma	(England)	CM	8 May 2001 (aged 23)	Tottenham Hotspur	2020	
Attackers
7	Kevin Schade	(Germany)	LW / FW	27 November 2001 (aged 22)	SC Freiburg	2023	
9	Igor Thiago	(Brazil)	FW	26 June 2001 (aged 23)	Club Brugge	2024	
11	Yoane Wissa	(Democratic Republic of the Congo)	FW / LW	3 September 1996 (aged 27)	Lorient	2021	
19	Bryan Mbeumo	(Cameroon)	RW / FW	7 August 1999 (aged 25)	Troyes	2019	
39	Gustavo Nunes	(Brazil)	LW	20 November 2005 (aged 18)	Grêmio	2024	
40	Iwan Morgan	(Wales)	FW	29 January 2006 (aged 18)	Swansea City	2023	
42	Tony Yogane	(England)	LW / LB	24 September 2005 (aged 18)	Sheffield Wednesday	2022	Loaned to Exeter City
Players who left the club mid-season
17	Ivan Toney	(England)	FW	16 March 1996 (aged 28)	Peterborough United	2020	Transferred to Al-Ahli

== Transfers ==
=== Transfers in ===
Date	Position	Nationality	Player	From	Fee	Ref.
1 July 2024 (Note: Eyestone's transfer was announced on 21 June 2024 and his contract commenced on 1 July 2024.)	GK	(United States)	Julian Eyestone	Free agent	Free transfer	
1 July 2024 (Note: Fredrick's transfer was announced on 30 April 2024 and his contract commenced on 1 July 2024.)	RB	(Nigeria)	Benjamin Fredrick	(Nigeria) Simoiben	Undisclosed	
1 July 2024 (Note: Thiago's transfer was announced on 14 February 2024 and his contract commenced on 1 July 2024.)	FW	(Brazil)	Igor Thiago	(Belgium) Club Brugge	£30,000,000	
12 August 2024	AM	(Portugal)	Fábio Carvalho	(England) Liverpool	£27,500,000	
22 August 2024	CB	(Netherlands)	Sepp van den Berg	(England) Liverpool	£25,000,000	
26 August 2024	LB	(England)	Vonnté Williams	(England) Crystal Palace	Free transfer	
28 August 2024	LW	(Brazil)	Gustavo Nunes	(Brazil) Grêmio	£10,000,000	
30 August 2024	LB	(England)	Jayden Meghoma	(England) Southampton	£5,000,000	
19 September 2024	CB	(England)	Caelan Avenell	(England) Fulham	Free transfer	
26 November 2024	CB	(England)	Josh Stephenson	(England) Millwall	Tribunal	

=== Loans in ===
Date	Position	Nationality	Player	From	Date until	Ref.
24 January 2025	RB	(Italy)	Michael Kayode	(Italy) Fiorentina	End of season (Note: Under the terms of Kayode's loan, Brentford paid a €500,000 fee.)	
3 February 2025	AM	(England)	Romelle Donovan	(England) Birmingham City	End of season	

=== Loans out ===
Date	Position	Nationality	Player	To	Date until	Ref.
1 July 2024 (Note: Balcombe's loan was announced on 24 May 2024 and commenced on 1 July 2024.)	GK	(England)	Ellery Balcombe	(Scotland) St Mirren	5 January 2025 (Note: Balcombe was recalled from his season-long loan at St Mirren on 5 January 2025.)	
1 July 2024 (Note: Olakigbe's loan was announced on 29 May 2024 and commenced on 1 July 2024.)	LW	(England)	Michael Olakigbe	(England) Wigan Athletic	27 January 2025 (Note: Olakigbe was recalled from his season-long loan at Wigan Athletic on 27 January 2025.)	
26 July 2024	GK	(England)	Ben Winterbottom	(England) AFC Fylde	End of season	
31 July 2024	CB	(France)	Tristan Crama	(England) Exeter City	16 January 2025 (Note: Crama was recalled from his season-long loan at Exeter City on 16 January 2025.)	
30 August 2024	AM	(England)	Myles Peart-Harris	(Wales) Swansea City	End of season	
30 August 2024	DM	(Nigeria)	Frank Onyeka	(Germany) FC Augsburg	End of season	
23 September 2024	LB	(Republic of Ireland)	Val Adedokun	(Hungary) Diósgyőr	1 January 2025 (Note: Adedokun was recalled from his season-long loan at Diósgyőr on 1 January 2025.)	
1 January 2025 (Note: Hay's loan was announced on 31 December 2024 and commenced on 1 January 2025.)	FW	(England)	Ashley Hay	(England) Cheltenham Town	End of season	
8 January 2025	LB	(Republic of Ireland)	Val Adedokun	(England) Cheltenham Town	22 April 2025 (Note: Adedokun was recalled from his half-season loan at Cheltenham Town on 22 April 2025.)	
16 January 2025	LB	(England)	Jayden Meghoma	(England) Preston North End	End of season	
23 January 2025	GK	(England)	Ellery Balcombe	(Scotland) Motherwell	End of season	
23 January 2025	LW	(England)	Tony Yogane	(England) Exeter City	End of season	
27 January 2025	RB	(Denmark)	Mads Roerslev	(Germany) VfL Wolfsburg	End of season	
28 January 2025	GK	(England)	Matthew Cox	(England) Crawley Town	End of season	
30 January 2025	MF	(England)	Ryan Trevitt	(England) Exeter City	End of season	
31 January 2025	LW	(England)	Michael Olakigbe	(England) Chesterfield	End of season	

=== Transfers out ===
Date	Position	Nationality	Player	To	Fee	Ref.
30 June 2024	GK	(Scotland)	Vincent Angelini	(Saudi Arabia) Al-Riyadh	Released	
30 June 2024	CM	(Grenada)	Shandon Baptiste	(England) Luton Town	Released	
30 June 2024	FB	(England)	Romeo Beckham	Retired		
30 June 2024	FB	(England)	Charlie Farr	(England) Alvechurch	Released	
30 June 2024	AM	(Iran)	Saman Ghoddos	(United Arab Emirates) Kalba	Released	
30 June 2024	CB	(England)	Charlie Goode	(England) Stevenage	Released	
30 June 2024	RB	(England)	Daniel Oyegoke	(Scotland) Heart of Midlothian	Undisclosed	
30 June 2024	CM	(England)	Angel Waruih	(England) Eastleigh	Released	
30 June 2024	RB	(England)	Byron Wilson	(England) Alvechurch	Released	
30 June 2024	FW	(England)	Nathan Young-Coombes	Free agent	Released	
30 June 2024	CB	(Albania)	Erion Zabeli	(Portugal) Ericeirense	Released	
3 July 2024	GK	(Spain)	David Raya	(England) Arsenal	£27,000,000	
8 July 2024	GK	(Albania)	Thomas Strakosha	(Greece) AEK Athens	Free transfer	
26 July 2024	RB	(Wales)	Fin Stevens	(Germany) FC St. Pauli	€1,000,000	
15 August 2024	CB	(Denmark)	Mathias Jørgensen	(Belgium) Anderlecht	Free transfer	
31 August 2024	FW	(England)	Ivan Toney	(Saudi Arabia) Al-Ahli	£40,000,000	
17 January 2025	CB	(France)	Tristan Crama	(England) Millwall	Undisclosed	
3 February 2025	FW	(England)	Kyreece Lisbie	(England) Colchester United	Undisclosed	

== Pre-season and friendlies ==
Win Draw Loss Fixtures

20 July 2024 Friendly	AFC Wimbledon	2–5	Brentford	Wimbledon
13:00 BST	Lewis 3'; Stevens 81'	Report	Igor Thiago 23', 31'; Wissa 45' (pen.); Schade 66'; Mbeumo 75'	Stadium: Plough Lane; Attendance: 3,458

25 July 2024 Friendly	Benfica	1–1	Brentford	Lisbon, Portugal
20:00 WEST	Pavlidis 24'; Aursnes (yellow card) 45'	Report	Peart-Harris (yellow card) 7'; Mbeumo 9'	Stadium: Estádio da Luz; Attendance: 40,826; Referee: Ricardo Baixinho

30 July 2024 Friendly	Estrela da Amadora	3–1	Brentford	Seixal, Portugal
11:00 WEST	Pinho; Kikas	Report	Jensen	Stadium: Benfica Campus; Attendance: 0

3 August 2024 Friendly	Watford	1–1	Brentford	Watford
15:00 BST	Sissoko 8'	Report	Schade 6'	Stadium: Vicarage Road; Attendance: 4,364; Referee: Sunny Singh Gill

9 August 2024 Friendly	Brentford	4–4	VfL Wolfsburg	Brentford
19:45 BST	Mbeumo 17'; Wissa 20'; Jensen 65'; Schade 81'	Report	Wimmer 34', 85'; Lacroix 41'; Arnold 78'	Stadium: Brentford Community Stadium; Attendance: 10,633; Referee: Simon Hooper

10 August 2024 Friendly	Brentford XI	2–1	VfL Wolfsburg XI	Osterley
	Lewis-Potter; Onyeka	Report	Wind	Stadium: Jersey Road; Attendance: 0

5 September 2024 Friendly	Brentford XI	0–0	Queens Park Rangers	Osterley
		Report		Stadium: Jersey Road; Attendance: 0

13 November 2024 Friendly	Brentford XI	2–1	Cardiff City	Osterley
	Brierley 65'; Arthur 75'	Report	Pearce	Stadium: Jersey Road; Attendance: 0

21 March 2025 Friendly	Brentford XI	1–0	Gil Vicente	Osterley
	Donovan 30'	Report		Stadium: Jersey Road; Attendance: 0

25 March 2025 Friendly	West Ham United	0–1	Brentford XI	Romford
		Report	Morgan	Stadium: Rush Green Training Ground; Attendance: 0

== Competitions ==
=== Overall record ===
Competition	First match	Last match	Starting round	Final position	Record							
Competition	First match	Last match	Starting round	Final position	Pld	W	D	L	GF	GA	GD	Win %
Premier League	18 August 2024	25 May 2025	Matchday 1	10th	38	16	8	14	66	57	+9	42.11
FA Cup	11 January 2025		Third round	Third round	1	0	0	1	0	1	−1	0.00
EFL Cup	28 August 2024	18 December 2024	Second round	Quarter-finals	4	2	1	1	6	5	+1	50.00
Total					43	18	9	16	72	63	+9	41.86

Source: Soccerway

=== Premier League ===
==== League table ====
Pos	Team	Pld	W	D	L	GF	GA	GD	Pts	Qualification or relegation
8	Brighton & Hove Albion	38	16	13	9	66	59	+7	61	
9	Bournemouth	38	15	11	12	58	46	+12	56	
10	Brentford	38	16	8	14	66	57	+9	56	
11	Fulham	38	15	9	14	54	54	0	54	
12	Crystal Palace	38	13	14	11	51	51	0	53	Qualification for the Conference League play-off round (Note: Since the winners of the 2024–25 EFL Cup, Newcastle United, qualified for the Champions League via league position, the spot reserved for the EFL Cup winners (Conference League play-off round) was initially passed to the 7th-placed team (Nottingham Forest). However due to multi-club ownership rules, the winners of the FA Cup, Crystal Palace, were not permitted to enter the Europa League and entered the Conference League play-off round instead, with Nottingham Forest taking their place in the Europa League. Crystal Palace appealed the decision but this was ultimately rejected.)

Source: Premier League
Rules for classification: 1) Points; 2) Goal difference; 3) Goals scored; 4) If the champions, relegated teams or qualified teams for UEFA competitions cannot be determined by rules 1 to 3, rules 4.1 to 4.3 are applied – 4.1) Points gained in head-to-head record between such teams; 4.2) Away goals scored in head-to-head record between such teams; 4.3) Play-offs

==== Results summary ====
Overall								Home						Away					
Pld	W	D	L	GF	GA	GD	Pts	W	D	L	GF	GA	GD	W	D	L	GF	GA	GD
38	16	8	14	66	57	+9	56	9	4	6	40	35	+5	7	4	8	26	22	+4

Source: Soccerway

==== Results by round ====
Round	1	2	3	4	5	6	7	8	9	10	11	12	13	14	15	16	17	18	19	20	21	22	23	24	25	26	27	28	29	30	31	32	33	34	35	36	37	38
Ground	H	A	H	A	A	H	H	A	H	A	H	A	H	A	H	A	H	A	H	A	H	H	A	H	A	A	H	H	A	A	H	A	H	A	H	A	H	A
Result	W	L	W	L	L	D	W	L	W	L	W	D	W	L	W	L	L	D	L	W	D	L	W	L	W	W	D	L	W	L	D	D	W	W	W	W	L	D
Position	6	13	6	9	12	12	11	13	9	12	11	11	8	11	9	11	12	11	12	11	11	11	11	11	11	11	11	12	11	11	12	11	11	11	9	8	9	10
Points	3	3	6	6	6	7	10	10	13	13	16	17	20	20	23	23	23	24	24	27	28	28	31	31	34	37	38	38	41	41	42	43	46	49	52	55	55	56

Source: Premier League
A = Away; H = Home; W = Win; D = Draw; L = Loss; P = Postponed

==== Matches ====
Win Draw Loss Fixtures

18 August 2024 1	Brentford	2–1	Crystal Palace	Brentford
14:00 BST	Wissa (yellow card) 20', (goal) 76'; Mbeumo 29'	Report	Andersen (yellow card) 22'; Guéhi (yellow card) 45+1'; Pinnock 56' (o.g.); Richards (yellow card) 58'; Kamada (yellow card) 65'; Ayew (yellow card) 90+1'	Stadium: Brentford Community Stadium; Attendance: 16,988; Referee: Sam Barrott
Note: Live on Sky Sports

25 August 2024 2	Liverpool	2–0	Brentford	Liverpool
16:30 BST	Díaz 13'; Szoboszlai (yellow card) 30'; Gravenberch (yellow card) 38'; Salah 70'	Report	Nørgaard (yellow card) 40'; Jensen (yellow card) 45'; Mbeumo (yellow card) 90+4'	Stadium: Anfield; Attendance: 60,107; Referee: Stuart Attwell
Note: Live on Sky Sports

31 August 2024 3	Brentford	3–1	Southampton	Brentford
15:00 BST	Mbeumo (yellow card) 29', (goal) 43', 65'; Wissa 69'; Pinnock (yellow card) 73'	Report	Harwood-Bellis (yellow card) 20'; Sugawara 90+5'	Stadium: Brentford Community Stadium; Attendance: 16,955; Referee: Josh Smith

14 September 2024 4	Manchester City	2–1	Brentford	Manchester
15:00 BST	Haaland 19', 32'; Kovačić (yellow card) 42'; Savinho (yellow card) 47'; Stones (yellow card) 79'	Report	Wissa 1'; Collins (yellow card) 82'	Stadium: City of Manchester Stadium; Attendance: 52,142; Referee: Darren Bond

21 September 2024 5	Tottenham Hotspur	3–1	Brentford	Tottenham
15:00 BST	Solanke 8'; Johnson 28'; Van de Ven (yellow card) 39'; Bissouma (yellow card) 66'; Maddison 85', (yellow card) 86'	Report	Mbeumo 1'; Ajer (yellow card) 58'	Stadium: Tottenham Hotspur Stadium; Attendance: 61,246; Referee: John Brooks

28 September 2024 6	Brentford	1–1	West Ham United	Brentford
15:00 BST	Mbeumo 1'; Yarmolyuk (yellow card) 67'; Lewis-Potter (yellow card) 87'	Report	Emerson (yellow card) 14'; Souček 54'; Kilman (yellow card) 90+3'; Irving (yellow card) 90+8'	Stadium: Brentford Community Stadium; Attendance: 17,050; Referee: Simon Hooper

5 October 2024 7	Brentford	5–3	Wolverhampton Wanderers	Brentford
15:00 BST	Collins 2'; Mbeumo 20' (pen.); Nørgaard 28'; Pinnock 45+2'; Ajer (yellow card) 55'; Janelt (yellow card) 87'; Carvalho 90'	Report	Cunha 4'; Larsen 26'; Dawson (yellow card) 42'; Forbs (yellow card) 55'; Semedo (yellow card) 70'; Aït-Nouri 90+3'	Stadium: Brentford Community Stadium; Attendance: 16,960; Referee: Andrew Madley

19 October 2024 8	Manchester United	2–1	Brentford	Trafford
15:00 BST	Evans (yellow card) 45+6'; Garnacho 47'; Dalot (yellow card) 54'; Højlund 62'	Report	Pinnock 45+5'; Nørgaard (yellow card) 55'; Ajer (yellow card) 73'	Stadium: Old Trafford; Attendance: 73,738; Referee: Sam Barrott

26 October 2024 9	Brentford	4–3	Ipswich Town	Brentford
15:00 BST	Wissa 44', 45+1'; Mbeumo 51' (pen.), 90+6'	Report	Szmodics 28'; Hirst 31'; Davis (yellow card) 42'; Clarke (yellow card) 49' (yellow-red card) 69'; Delap 86'	Stadium: Brentford Community Stadium; Attendance: 17,109; Referee: Lewis Smith

4 November 2024 10	Fulham	2–1	Brentford	Fulham
20:00 GMT	Wilson 90+2', 90+7', (yellow card) 90+8'; Muniz (yellow card) 90+7'	Report	Janelt 24'; Roerslev (yellow card) 57'	Stadium: Craven Cottage; Attendance: 24,931; Referee: Stuart Attwell
Note: Fixture was initially scheduled for 2 November, but was moved for live Sky Sports broadcast.

9 November 2024 11	Brentford	3–2	Bournemouth	Brentford
15:00 GMT	Wissa 27', 58'; Damsgaard 50'; Schade (yellow card) 88'; Carvalho (yellow card) 90+7'	Report	Evanilson 17'; Senesi (yellow card) 34'; Kluivert 49'; Christie (yellow card) 68'; Smith (yellow card) 81'; Zabarnyi (yellow card) 89'	Stadium: Brentford Community Stadium; Attendance: 16,993; Referee: Darren Bond

23 November 2024 12	Everton	0–0	Brentford	Liverpool
15:00 GMT		Report	Nørgaard (red card) 41'	Stadium: Goodison Park; Attendance: 38,915; Referee: Chris Kavanagh

30 November 2024 13	Brentford	4–1	Leicester City	Brentford
15:00 GMT	Wissa 25'; Schade 29', 45+8', 59'; Lewis-Potter (yellow card) 63'	Report	Buonanotte 21'; Justin (yellow card) 82'	Stadium: Brentford Community Stadium; Attendance: 17,084; Referee: Michael Oliver

4 December 2024 14	Aston Villa	3–1	Brentford	Birmingham
20:15 GMT	Rogers 21'; Watkins 28' (pen.); Cash 34', (yellow card) 82'; Durán (yellow card) 65'	Report	Pinnock (yellow card) 25'; Collins (yellow card) 49'; Damsgaard 54'	Stadium: Villa Park; Attendance: 37,890; Referee: Lewis Smith
Note: Fixture was initially scheduled for 3 December, but was moved for live Amazon Prime broadcast.

7 December 2024 15	Brentford	4–2	Newcastle United	Brentford
15:00 BST	Mbeumo 8'; Wissa 28'; Lewis-Potter (yellow card) 45+3'; Collins 56'; Van den Berg (yellow card) 67'; Flekken (yellow card) 88'; Schade 90'	Report	Isak 11'; Barnes 32'	Stadium: Brentford Community Stadium; Attendance: 17,078; Referee: Simon Hooper

15 December 2024 16	Chelsea	2–1	Brentford	Fulham
19:00 GMT	Cucurella 43', (yellow card) 90+5' (yellow-red card) 90+8'; Jackson 80'	Report	Mbeumo 90'; Janelt (yellow card) 90+6'; Schade (yellow card) 90+8'	Stadium: Stamford Bridge; Attendance: 39,751; Referee: Peter Bankes
Note: Fixture was initially scheduled for 14 December, but was rearranged due to Chelsea's participation in the UEFA Conference League.

21 December 2025 17	Brentford	0–2	Nottingham Forest	Brentford
15:00 GMT	Mee (yellow card) 40'; Wissa (yellow card) 57'; Damsgaard (yellow card) 87'	Report	Murillo (yellow card) 27'; Aina 38'; Elanga 51'; Gibbs-White (yellow card) 55'; Silva (yellow card) 79'; Domínguez (yellow card) 84'	Stadium: Brentford Community Stadium; Attendance: 17,115; Referee: Michael Oliver

27 December 2024 18	Brighton & Hove Albion	0–0	Brentford	Brighton and Hove
19:30 GMT		Report	Mee (yellow card) 57'; Yarmolyuk (yellow card) 75'	Stadium: Falmer Stadium; Attendance: 31,548; Referee: Andrew Madley
Note: Fixture was initially scheduled for 26 December, but was moved for live Amazon Prime broadcast.

1 January 2025 19	Brentford	1–3	Arsenal	Brentford
17:30 GMT	Mbeumo 13'; Nørgaard (yellow card) 26'	Report	Timber (yellow card) 17'; Gabriel Jesus 29'; Merino 50'; Martinelli 53'; Calafiori (yellow card) 57'	Stadium: Brentford Community Stadium; Attendance: 17,190; Referee: Peter Bankes
Note: Fixture was initially scheduled for 29 December, but was moved for live TNT Sports broadcast.

4 January 2025 20	Southampton	0–5	Brentford	Southampton
15:00 GMT	Walker-Peters (yellow card) 22'; Harwood-Bellis (yellow card) 64'	Report	Schade 6'; Mbeumo 62', 69' (pen.); Lewis-Potter 90+2'; Wissa 90+4'	Stadium: St Mary's Stadium; Attendance: 31,001; Referee: Stuart Attwell

14 January 2025 21	Brentford	2–2	Manchester City	Brentford
19:30 GMT	Wissa 82'; Nørgaard 90+2'	Report	Foden 66', 78'	Stadium: Brentford Community Stadium; Attendance: 17,048; Referee: Anthony Taylor
Note: Live on TNT Sports

18 January 2025 22	Brentford	0–2	Liverpool	Brentford
15:00 GMT	Nørgaard (yellow card) 68'; Roerslev (yellow card) 69'	Report	Tsimikas (yellow card) 8'; Szoboszlai (yellow card) 43'; Núñez 90+1', 90+3', (yellow card) 90+1'	Stadium: Brentford Community Stadium; Attendance: 17,215; Referee: Andrew Madley

26 January 2025 23	Crystal Palace	1–2	Brentford	Selhurst
14:00 GMT	Lacroix (yellow card) 24'; Henderson (yellow card) 66'; Esse 85'	Report	Janelt (yellow card) 56'; Mbeumo 66' (pen.); Lewis-Potter (yellow card) 73'; Schade 80'	Stadium: Selhurst Park; Attendance: 25,066; Referee: Tony Harrington
Note: Fixture was initially scheduled for 25 January, but was moved for live Sky Sports broadcast.

2 February 2025 24	Brentford	0–2	Tottenham Hotspur	Brentford
14:00 GMT		Report	Janelt 29' (o.g.); Son Heung-min (yellow card) 41'; Sarr 87'	Stadium: Brentford Community Stadium; Attendance: 17,154; Referee: Jarred Gillett
Note: Fixture was initially scheduled for 1 February, but was moved for live Sky Sports broadcast.

15 February 2025 25	West Ham United	0–1	Brentford	Stratford
15:00 BST	Souček (yellow card) 28'	Report	Schade 4'; Damsgaard (yellow card) 32'	Stadium: London Stadium; Attendance: 62,467; Referee: Darren England

21 February 2025 26	Leicester City	0–4	Brentford	Leicester
20:00 GMT	De Cordova-Reid (yellow card) 28'; Coulibaly (yellow card) 42'; Okoli (yellow card) 45'; Buonanotte (yellow card) 67'	Report	Wissa 17'; Mbeumo 27'; Nørgaard 32'; Carvalho 89'	Stadium: King Power Stadium; Attendance: 31,077; Referee: Tony Harrington
Note: Fixture was initially scheduled for 22 February, but was moved for live Sky Sports broadcast.

26 February 2025 27	Brentford	1–1	Everton	Brentford
19:30 GMT	Wissa 45+4'; Yarmolyuk (yellow card) 80'; Collins (yellow card) 90+1'	Report	O'Brien 77'; Alcaraz (yellow card) 88'	Stadium: Brentford Community Stadium; Attendance: 17,082; Referee: Simon Hooper
Note: Fixture was initially scheduled for 25 February, but was moved for live TNT Sports broadcast.

8 March 2025 28	Brentford	0–1	Aston Villa	Brentford
17:30 GMT	Ajer (yellow card) 67'; Collins (yellow card) 90+6'	Report	McGinn (yellow card) 42'; Watkins 49'; Cash (yellow card) 81'	Stadium: Brentford Community Stadium; Attendance: 17,171; Referee: Jarred Gillett
Note: Fixture was initially scheduled for a 15:00 kick-off, but was moved for live Sky Sports broadcast.

15 March 2025 29	Bournemouth	1–2	Brentford	Bournemouth
17:30 BST	Janelt 17' (o.g.); Tavernier (yellow card) 68'; Semenyo (yellow card) 75'; Hill (yellow card) 89'	Report	Wissa 30'; Nørgaard 71'	Stadium: Dean Court; Attendance: 11,180; Referee: Craig Pawson
Note: Fixture was initially scheduled for a 15:00 kick-off, but was moved for live Sky Sports broadcast.

2 April 2025 30	Newcastle United	2–1	Brentford	Newcastle upon Tyne
19:45 BST	Isak 45+2'; Schär (yellow card) 70'; Tonali 74'	Report	Mbeumo 66' (pen.); Lewis-Potter (yellow card) 72'	Stadium: St James' Park; Attendance: 52,021; Referee: Peter Bankes

6 April 2025 31	Brentford	0–0	Chelsea	Brentford
14:00 BST	Van den Berg (yellow card) 77'	Report	Gusto (yellow card) 26'; Adarabioyo (yellow card) 45'; Fernández (yellow card) 87'	Stadium: Brentford Community Stadium; Attendance: 17,183; Referee: Michael Oliver
Note: Fixture was initially scheduled for 5 April, but was rearranged due to Chelsea’s fixture against Tottenham Hotspur being moved to 3 April.

12 April 2025 32	Arsenal	1–1	Brentford	Holloway
17:30 BST	Partey 61'; Ødegaard (yellow card) 90+4'	Report	Nørgaard (yellow card) 28'; Schade (yellow card) 34'; Wissa 74'; Yarmolyuk (yellow card) 78'	Stadium: Emirates Stadium; Attendance: 60,184; Referee: Simon Hooper
Note: Fixture was initially scheduled for a 15:00 kick-off, but was moved for live Sky Sports broadcast.

19 April 2025 33	Brentford	4–2	Brighton & Hove Albion	Brentford
15:00 BST	Mbeumo 9', 48'; Kayode (yellow card) 18'; Wissa 58'; Jensen (yellow card) 90+1'; Nørgaard 90+5'; Collins (yellow card) 90+7'	Report	Welbeck (yellow card) 40', (goal) 45+3'; João Pedro (red card) 61'; Mitoma 81'; Estupiñán (yellow card) 90+4'; Van Hecke (yellow card) 90+7'	Stadium: Brentford Community Stadium; Attendance: 17,083; Referee: Tim Robinson

1 May 2025 34	Nottingham Forest	0–2	Brentford	West Bridgford
19:30 BST	Gibbs-White (yellow card) 10'; Anderson (yellow card) 18'; Williams (yellow card) 63'	Report	Lewis-Potter (yellow card) 11'; Mbeumo (yellow card) 36'; Nørgaard (yellow card) 42'; Schade 44'; Yarmolyuk (yellow card) 63'; Wissa 70'; Ajer (yellow card) 89'	Stadium: City Ground; Attendance: 29,040; Referee: Darren England
Note: Live on Sky Sports. Fixture was initially scheduled for 26 April, but was rearranged due to Nottingham Forest's participation in the FA Cup.

4 May 2025 35	Brentford	4–3	Manchester United	Brentford
14:00 BST	Shaw 27' (o.g.); Schade 33', 70'; Wissa 74'	Report	Mount 14'; Ugarte (yellow card) 43'; Garnacho (yellow card) 51', (goal) 82'; Amad 90+5'	Stadium: Brentford Community Stadium; Attendance: 18,915; Referee: Anthony Taylor
Note: Fixture was initially scheduled for 3 May, but was rearranged due to the 26 April Nottingham Forest away fixture being moved to 1 May.

10 May 2025 36	Ipswich Town	0–1	Brentford	Ipswich
15:00 BST	Taylor (yellow card) 17'; Hirst (yellow card) 83'	Report	Nørgaard (yellow card) 17'; Schade 18'; Wissa (yellow card) 70'; Kayode (yellow card) 83'; Yarmolyuk (yellow card) 90+2'	Stadium: Portman Road; Attendance: 29,511; Referee: Sam Barrott

18 May 2025 37	Brentford	2–3	Fulham	Brentford
15:00 BST	Mbeumo 22', (penalty missed) 27'; Wissa (yellow card) 37', (goal) 43'; Van den Berg (yellow card) 45+2'; Nørgaard (yellow card) 48'; Lewis-Potter (yellow card) 52'	Report	Tete (yellow card) 14'; Jiménez 16'; Smith Rowe (yellow card) 66'; Cairney 68'; Wilson 70'; Andersen (yellow card) 72'; Leno (yellow card) 90+8'	Stadium: Brentford Community Stadium; Attendance: 17,136; Referee: Jarred Gillett

25 May 2025 38	Wolverhampton Wanderers	1–1	Brentford	Wolverhampton
16:00 BST	João Gomes (yellow card) 35'; Semedo (yellow card) 72'; Munetsi 75'	Report	Mbeumo 20'; Wissa (yellow card) 60'	Stadium: Molineux Stadium; Attendance: 31,382; Referee: Craig Pawson

=== FA Cup ===
Win Draw Loss Fixtures

11 January 2025 Third round	Brentford	0–1	Plymouth Argyle	Brentford
15:00 GMT		Report	Whittaker 82'	Stadium: Brentford Community Stadium; Attendance: 16,790; Referee: Ben Toner

=== EFL Cup ===
Win Draw Loss Fixtures

28 August 2024 Second round	Colchester United	0–1	Brentford	Colchester
19:45 BST	Ihionvien (yellow card) 71'; Payne (penalty missed) 82'; Tovide (yellow card) 90+4'	Report	Lewis-Potter 45', (yellow card) 83'	Stadium: Colchester Community Stadium; Attendance: 6,716; Referee: Paul Howard

17 September 2024 Third round	Brentford	3–1	Leyton Orient	Brentford
19:45 BST	Carvalho 17'; Damsgaard 26'; Nørgaard 45', (yellow card) 60'	Report	Cooper 11'; Donley (yellow card) 39'; Simpson (yellow card) 42' (yellow-red card) 69'	Stadium: Brentford Community Stadium; Attendance: 13,634; Referee: Lewis Smith

29 October 2024 Fourth round	Brentford	1–1 (5–4 p)	Sheffield Wednesday	Brentford
20:00 GMT	Schade 11'	Report	Gassama 57'; Smith (yellow card) 90'	Stadium: Brentford Community Stadium; Attendance: 16,701; Referee: Will Finnie
	Penalties
	Mbeumo (penalty scored); Lewis-Potter (penalty scored); Damsgaard (penalty scored); Wissa (penalty scored); Janelt (penalty scored)		(penalty scored) Smith; (penalty scored) Windass; (penalty scored) J. Lowe; (penalty scored) Johnson; (penalty missed) Palmer
Note: Live on Sky Sports

18 December 2024 Quarter-finals	Newcastle United	3–1	Brentford	Newcastle upon Tyne
19:45 GMT	Tonali 9', 43'; Schär (yellow card) 17', (goal) 69'; Bruno Guimarães (yellow card) 38'; Livramento (yellow card) 45+1'	Report	Collins (yellow card) 31'; Wissa 90+1'	Stadium: St James' Park; Attendance: 51,765; Referee: Sam Barrott
Note: Live on Sky Sports

== Statistics ==
=== Appearances and goals ===
No.	Pos.	Nat.	Player	League		FA Cup		EFL Cup		Total	
No.	Pos.	Nat.	Player	Apps	Goals	Apps	Goals	Apps	Goals	Apps	Goals
1	GK	(Netherlands)	Mark Flekken	37	0	0	0	2	0	39	0
3	DF	(Jamaica)	Rico Henry	0 (5)	0	1	0	0	0	1 (5)	0
4	DF	(Netherlands)	Sepp van den Berg	29 (2)	0	1	0	3	0	33 (2)	0
5	DF	(Jamaica)	Ethan Pinnock	21 (1)	2	0	0	1	0	22 (1)	2
6	MF	(Denmark)	Christian Nørgaard	34	5	0	0	1	1	35	6
7	FW	(Germany)	Kevin Schade	26 (12)	11	1	0	4	1	31 (12)	12
8	MF	(Denmark)	Mathias Jensen	8 (16)	0	1	0	1 (1)	0	10 (17)	0
9	FW	(Brazil)	Igor Thiago	1 (7)	0	0	0	0	0	1 (7)	0
11	FW	(Democratic Republic of the Congo)	Yoane Wissa	34 (1)	19	0 (1)	0	1 (2)	1	35 (4)	20
12	GK	(Iceland)	Hákon Valdimarsson	1 (1)	0	1	0	2	0	4 (1)	0
14	MF	(Portugal)	Fábio Carvalho	3 (16)	2	1	0	4	1	8 (16)	3
15	MF	(Nigeria)	Frank Onyeka	0 (2)	0	―		1	0	1 (2)	0
16	DF	(England)	Ben Mee	2 (5)	0	0	0	4	0	6 (5)	0
18	MF	(Ukraine)	Yehor Yarmolyuk	15 (16)	0	1	0	3	0	19 (16)	0
19	FW	(Cameroon)	Bryan Mbeumo	38	20	0 (1)	0	1 (2)	0	39 (3)	20
20	DF	(Norway)	Kristoffer Ajer	17 (7)	0	0	0	1	0	18 (7)	0
21	DF	(England)	Jayden Meghoma	0 (1)	0	0	0	2 (1)	0	2 (2)	0
22	DF	(Republic of Ireland)	Nathan Collins	38	2	0 (1)	0	2 (1)	0	40 (2)	2
23	DF	(England)	Keane Lewis-Potter	36 (2)	1	0 (1)	0	3 (1)	1	39 (4)	2
24	MF	(Denmark)	Mikkel Damsgaard	34 (4)	2	1	0	2 (2)	1	36 (6)	3
25	MF	(England)	Myles Peart-Harris	0	0	―		1	0	1	0
26	MF	(Turkey)	Yunus Emre Konak	0 (10)	0	0	0	1 (1)	0	1 (11)	0
27	MF	(Germany)	Vitaly Janelt	27 (5)	1	0	0	2	0	29 (5)	1
28	MF	(England)	Ryan Trevitt	0 (1)	0	0	0	2	0	2 (1)	0
30	DF	(Denmark)	Mads Roerslev	11 (8)	0	1	0	1 (2)	0	13 (10)	0
32	MF	(England)	Paris Maghoma	0 (8)	0	1	0	0 (1)	0	1 (9)	0
36	DF	(South Korea)	Kim Ji-soo	0 (3)	0	1	0	0 (1)	0	1 (4)	0
39	FW	(Brazil)	Gustavo Nunes	0 (3)	0	0	0	0	0	0 (3)	0
42	FW	(England)	Tony Yogane	0	0	0	0	0 (1)	0	0 (1)	0
Players loaned in during the season
33	DF	(Italy)	Michael Kayode	6 (6)	0	―		―		6 (6)	0

- Source: Soccerbase

=== Goalscorers ===
No.	Pos.	Nat.	Player	PL	FAC	EFLC	Total
19	FW	(Cameroon)	Bryan Mbeumo	20	0	0	20
11	FW	(Democratic Republic of the Congo)	Yoane Wissa	19	0	1	20
7	FW	(Germany)	Kevin Schade	11	0	1	12
6	MF	(Denmark)	Christian Nørgaard	5	0	1	6
14	MF	(Portugal)	Fábio Carvalho	2	0	1	3
24	MF	(Denmark)	Mikkel Damsgaard	2	0	1	3
22	DF	(Republic of Ireland)	Nathan Collins	2	0	0	2
5	DF	(Jamaica)	Ethan Pinnock	2	0	0	2
23	DF	(England)	Keane Lewis-Potter	1	0	1	2
27	MF	(Germany)	Vitaly Janelt	1	0	0	1
Opponent				1	0	0	1
Total				68	0	6	73

- Source: Soccerbase, FBREF

=== Discipline ===
No.	Pos.	Nat.	Player	PL		FAC		EFLC		Total		Pts
No.	Pos.	Nat.	Player	Yellow card	Red card	Yellow card	Red card	Yellow card	Red card	Yellow card	Red card	Pts
6	MF	(Denmark)	Christian Nørgaard	8	0	0	0	1	0	9	0	9
23	DF	(England)	Keane Lewis-Potter	7	0	0	0	1	0	8	0	8
18	MF	(Ukraine)	Yehor Yarmolyuk	6	0	0	0	0	0	6	0	6
22	DF	(Republic of Ireland)	Nathan Collins	5	0	0	0	1	0	6	0	6
20	DF	(Norway)	Kristoffer Ajer	5	0	0	0	0	0	5	0	5
11	FW	(Democratic Republic of the Congo)	Yoane Wissa	5	0	0	0	0	0	5	0	5
4	DF	(Netherlands)	Sepp van den Berg	3	0	0	0	0	0	3	0	3
27	MF	(Germany)	Vitaly Janelt	3	0	0	0	0	0	3	0	3
19	FW	(Cameroon)	Bryan Mbeumo	3	0	0	0	0	0	3	0	3
7	FW	(Germany)	Kevin Schade	3	0	0	0	0	0	3	0	3
24	MF	(Denmark)	Mikkel Damsgaard	2	0	0	0	0	0	2	0	2
33	DF	(Italy)	Michael Kayode	2	0	―		―		2	0	2
16	DF	(England)	Ben Mee	2	0	0	0	0	0	2	0	2
5	DF	(Jamaica)	Ethan Pinnock	2	0	0	0	0	0	2	0	2
30	DF	(Denmark)	Mads Roerslev	2	0	0	0	0	0	2	0	2
14	MF	(Portugal)	Fábio Carvalho	1	0	0	0	0	0	1	0	1
1	GK	(Netherlands)	Mark Flekken	1	0	0	0	0	0	1	0	1
8	MF	(Denmark)	Mathias Jensen	1	0	0	0	0	0	1	0	1
Total				59	0	0	0	3	0	62	0	62

- Source: FBREF

== Honours ==
- Brentford Supporters' Player of the Year: Mikkel Damsgaard
- Brentford Players' Player of the Year: Mikkel Damsgaard

=== Player of the Month ===
Month	Player	Ref.
September 2024	Bryan Mbeumo	
October 2024	Mikkel Damsgaard	
November 2024	Mikkel Damsgaard	
December 2024	Mikkel Damsgaard	
January 2025	Mikkel Damsgaard	
February 2025	Mark Flekken	
March 2025	Christian Nørgaard	
April 2025	Bryan Mbeumo	
