= Christian Nørgaard =

Danish footballer (born 1994)

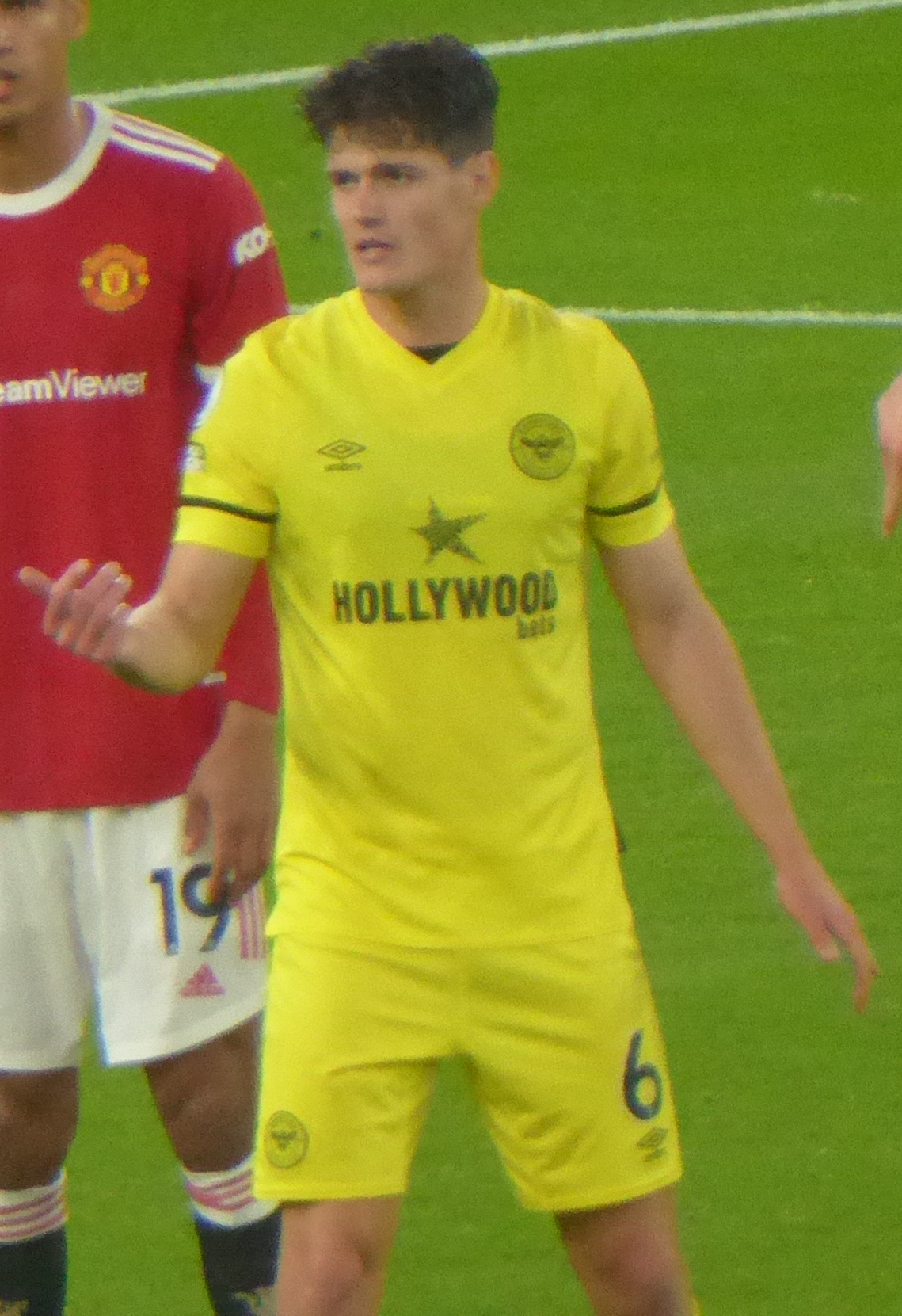
- Nørgaard playing for Brentford in 2022

Personal information
- Full name: Christian Thers Barsøe Nørgaard
- Date of birth: 10 March 1994 (age 32)
- Place of birth: Copenhagen, Denmark
- Height: 1.86 m (6 ft 1 in)
- Position: Defensive midfielder

Team information
- Current team: Everton
- Number: 23

Youth career
- BK Heimdal
- –2008: Espergærde IF
- 2008–2011: Lyngby

Senior career*
Years	Team	Apps	(Gls)
2011–2012	Lyngby	1	(0)
2012–2013	Hamburger SV II	22	(2)
2013–2018	Brøndby	116	(8)
2018–2019	Fiorentina	6	(0)
2019–2025	Brentford	181	(11)
2025–2026	Arsenal	7	(0)
2026–	Everton	1	(0)

International career^{‡}
2009–2010	Denmark U16	3	(0)
2010–2011	Denmark U17	22	(3)
2011–2013	Denmark U19	19	(1)
2013	Denmark U20	2	(1)
2013–2017	Denmark U21	27	(0)
2020–2026	Denmark	41	(2)
- * Club domestic league appearances and goals as of 23:16, 17 October 2026 (UTC) ‡ National team caps and goals as of 23:53, 31 March 2026 (UTC)

Christian Thers Barsøe Nørgaard (Danish pronunciation: [ˈkʰʁɛs.tjæn ˈnɶɐ̯ˌkɒˀ]; born 10 March 1994) is a Danish professional footballer who plays as a defensive midfielder or centre back for Premier League club Everton.

Between abortive spells with Hamburger SV and Fiorentina, Nørgaard came to prominence in his homeland with Brøndby. He transferred to English club Brentford in 2019 and in 2021 was part of the squad which won promotion to the top-flight of English football for the second time in the club's history. Nørgaard was named club captain in 2023. In July 2025, he signed with fellow London club Arsenal, winning the Premier League & Community Shield. He was part of the Denmark squads at Euro 2020, the 2022 World Cup and Euro 2024. In August 2026, Nørgaard transferred to Everton on a two-year contract from Arsenal.

== Club career ==
=== Early years ===
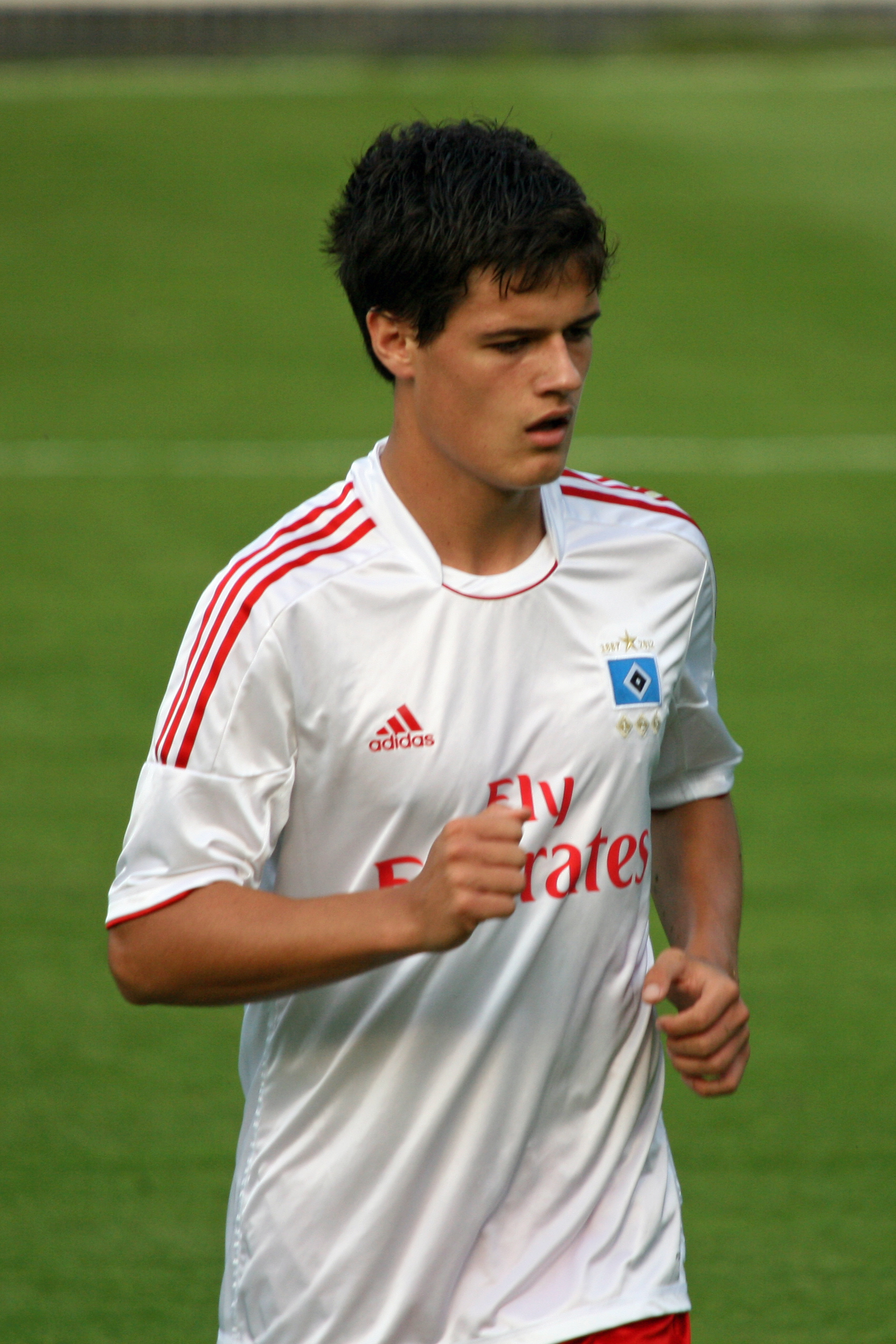
Nørgaard playing for Hamburger SV II in 2012

A defensive midfielder, Nørgaard began his career in his native Denmark with BK Heimdal and Espergærde IF, before entering the youth system at Lyngby in 2008. He progressed to win three calls into the first team squad during the 2011–12 season and made his only senior appearance for the club as a substitute in a 2–2 Superliga draw with HB Køge on 20 November 2011. Two months later, Nørgaard spurned interest from A.C. Milan and TSG 1899 Hoffenheim to transfer to Bundesliga club Hamburger SV for a €400,000 fee. He signed a 3 1/2-year contract, but was unable to settle at the club and failed to make any first team appearances before his departure in August 2013. He gained his first regular experience of senior football with 22 appearances for the reserve team.

=== Brøndby IF ===
On 21 August 2013, it was announced that Nørgaard had joined Danish Superliga club Brøndby on a four-year contract. Following a difficult first three seasons with the club, he thereafter was a regular fixture in the team under incoming manager Alexander Zorniger and signed a new 2 1/2-year contract in January 2017. Nørgaard was named as Brøndby's Player of the Year for the 2017 calendar year and won the first silverware of his career with the 2017–18 Danish Cup. Nørgaard became a cult hero at the club and by the time of his departure in July 2018, he had made 145 appearances and scored 11 goals.

=== Fiorentina ===
On 19 July 2018, Nørgaard moved to Italy to sign for Serie A club Fiorentina for a fee of approximately €3.5 million. He signed a four-year contract, but was informed towards the end of the 2018–19 season that he was free to leave the club. Nørgaard made just six appearances before departing the Stadio Artemio Franchi in May 2019.

=== Brentford ===
==== 2019–20 ====
On 28 May 2019, Nørgaard moved to England to join Brentford on a four-year contract, with the option of an additional year, for an undisclosed fee, reported to be £2.8 million. Wanting to "fall in love with football again", the move reunited Nørgaard with his former Denmark youth and Brøndby head coach Thomas Frank, who had initially made contact with him during the previous season. Used as a screening midfielder in front of the defence, Nørgaard made 45 appearances during the 2019–20 season, which ended with defeat in the 2020 Championship play-off final. In September 2020, he signed a new four-year contract, with the option of a further year.

==== 2020–21 ====
Nørgaard began the 2020–21 season as a virtual ever-present in midfield and winning senior international recognition with Denmark, but an ankle injury suffered during a match versus Preston North End on 4 October 2020 prevented him from making all but one appearance during the following four months. Nørgaard returned to the team in late February 2021 and late in the season he was deployed as the sweeper in a 3-5-2 formation. An injury restricted Nørgaard to only one appearance during Brentford's 2021 playoff campaign, which culminated in promotion to the Premier League after a 2–0 victory over Swansea City in the Final. He finished the season with 22 appearances and one goal, scored in a 2–0 EFL Cup second round win over Southampton early in the campaign.

==== 2021–22 ====
Nørgaard scored his second Brentford career goal on the opening day of the 2021–22 season, in a 2–0 win over Arsenal. He continued as a virtual ever-present in Premier League matches and in late December 2021, he signed a new 3 1/2-year contract, with a one-year option. Nørgaard's performances were recognised with the club's Supporters' and Players' Player of the Year awards. He ended the 2021–22 season with 38 appearances, three goals and having attempted the most tackles of any Premier League player.

==== 2022–23 ====
Due to a knee problem suffered prior to Brentford's final match of the 2021–22 season, Nørgaard missed much of Brentford's 2022–23 pre-season, though he participated in the club's training camp. He returned to match play for the final friendly of pre-season on 30 July 2022. Nørgaard was affected by a persistent achilles problem during the regular season, which did not require surgery and after playing through pain mid-season, the issue seemed to resolve itself. He missed three months of the season and finished with 23 appearances and one goal. As vice-captain, many of his appearances came as captain, deputising for the injured Pontus Jansson, who missed much of the season.

==== 2023–24 ====
Following the departure of captain Pontus Jansson at the end of the 2022–23 season, Nørgaard took over the armband. During the 2023–24 pre-season, Nørgaard was left out of the club's 2023 Premier League Summer Series squad, but he made a goalscoring return to match play in a behind closed doors friendly versus Lille on 5 August 2023. Again a starter when fit, Nørgaard made 33 appearances and scored two goals during the 2023–24 season, in which Brentford finished in 16th place, albeit 13 points clear of the relegation zone.

==== 2024–25 ====
Nørgaard was again a first-choice in league matches during the 2024–25 season, missing only four. He signed a new two-year contract in March 2025 and ended the season with 35 appearances and a career-high six goals. This was his sixth and final season playing for Brentford, concluding his time at the club with 196 appearances and scoring 13 goals.

=== Arsenal ===
On 10 July 2025, Nørgaard was signed by fellow Premier League club Arsenal on a two-year deal for a reported fee of £10 million, with the possibility of performance-related add-ons worth £5 million. Nørgaard made his competitive debut for the Gunners on 16 September 2025, coming on as a stoppage time substitute for Noni Madueke in Arsenal's 2–0 UEFA Champions League win over Athletic Bilbao at San Mamés. He then made his first start eight days later, in a 2–0 victory against Port Vale in the third round of the EFL Cup at Vale Park.

Nørgaard made seven Premier League appearances for Arsenal, which was enough for him to earn a winner's medal, as the Gunners won their first league title in twenty-two years.

=== Everton ===
Nørgaard joined Everton on a two-year-deal for a fee of £7 million in August 2026. He made his debut on 17 October 2026, replacing Harrison Armstrong in the 85th minute in a 2–0 defeat to Chelsea at Hill Dickinson Stadium.

== International career ==
Nørgaard won 73 caps and scored five goals for Denmark between U16 and U21 level. He was a part of the Danes' 2011 U17 World Cup and 2015 and 2017 European U21 Championship squads.

Nørgaard an unused substitute for the senior team during four 2018–19 Nations League group stage and Euro 2020 qualifying matches in 2018 and 2019. On 8 September 2020, Nørgaard made his debut for the senior team with a start in a 0–0 Nations League draw with England and his performance was recognised with the DBU's man of the match award.

After winning three further caps during the 2020–21 season, Nørgaard was named in the Denmark squad for Euro 2020 and appeared as a substitute in five of the six matches of the Danes' run to the semi-final. Nørgaard was named in Denmark's 2022 World Cup squad and made one substitute appearance prior to the team's group stage exit. Nørgaard was named in Denmark's Euro 2024 squad and made three substitute appearances prior to the team's round-of-16 exit.

On 12 May 2026, Nørgaard officially announced his retirement from international football following Denmark's failure to qualify for the 2026 World Cup. He concluded his career with 41 caps, having represented his country at the Euro 2020, World Cup 2022 and Euro 2024. In his retirement statement, Nørgaard cited a desire to spend more time with his family and a wish to make way for the next generation of Danish talents.

== Style of play ==
Nørgaard has been described as "technically good and looks to pass the ball forward. Importantly, he is also good at intercepting passes and has a strong defensive mindset". He "can play in a variety of different positions in the midfield, but has given his best performances as a deep midfield player". "His ability to sense danger and make interceptions is at an extraordinarily high level, as is his ability to play forward on the first or second touch".

== Personal life ==
Nørgaard was born in Copenhagen and grew up in Espergærde from the age of five. He is married to Josefine Barsøe and they have three sons.

== Career statistics ==
=== Club ===
As of match played 29 October 2026

Appearances and goals by club, season and competition
Club	Season	League			National cup (Note: Includes Danish Cup, FA Cup)		League cup (Note: Includes EFL Cup)		Europe		Other		Total	
Club	Season	Division	Apps	Goals	Apps	Goals	Apps	Goals	Apps	Goals	Apps	Goals	Apps	Goals
Lyngby BK	2011–12	Danish Superliga	1	0	0	0	—		—		—		1	0
Hamburger SV II	2011–12	Regionalliga Nord	6	1	—		—		—		—		6	1
Hamburger SV II	2012–13	Regionalliga Nord	16	1	—		—		—		—		16	1
Hamburger SV II	Total		22	2	—		—		—		—		22	2
Hamburger SV	2012–13	Bundesliga	0	0	0	0	—		—		—		0	0
Brøndby	2013–14	Danish Superliga	13	0	0	0	—		—		—		13	0
Brøndby	2014–15	Danish Superliga	21	3	3	1	—		1 (Note: Appearance(s) in UEFA Europa League)	0	—		26	4
Brøndby	2015–16	Danish Superliga	16	0	4	0	—		4	0	—		25	0
Brøndby	2016–17	Danish Superliga	31	4	4	1	—		8	0	—		27	5
Brøndby	2017–18	Danish Superliga	34	1	4	1	—		3	0	—		41	2
Brøndby	2018–19	Danish Superliga	1	0	—		—		0	0	—		1	0
Brøndby	Total		116	8	15	3	—		16	0	—		147	11
Fiorentina	2018–19	Serie A	6	0	0	0	—		—		—		6	0
Brentford	2019–20	Championship	42	0	0	0	0	0	—		3 (Note: Appearance(s) in EFL Championship play-offs)	0	45	0
Brentford	2020–21	Championship	17	0	0	0	4	1	—		1	0	22	1
Brentford	2021–22	Premier League	35	3	1	0	2	0	—		—		38	3
Brentford	2022–23	Premier League	22	1	0	0	1	0	—		—		23	1
Brentford	2023–24	Premier League	31	2	1	0	1	0	—		—		33	2
Brentford	2024–25	Premier League	34	5	0	0	1	1	—		—		35	6
Brentford	Total		181	11	2	0	9	2	—		4	0	196	13
Arsenal	2025–26	Premier League	7	0	4	0	3	0	6 (Note: Appearances in UEFA Champions League)	0	—		20	0
Everton	2026–27	Premier League	1	0	0	0	1	0	—		—		2	0
Career total			334	22	21	3	13	2	22	0	4	0	394	27

=== International ===
Appearances and goals by national team and year
National team	Year	Apps	Goals
Denmark	2020	1	0
Denmark	2021	14	1
Denmark	2022	3	0
Denmark	2023	6	0
Denmark	2024	8	0
Denmark	2025	7	0
Denmark	2026	2	1
Total		41	2

Scores and results list Denmark's goal tally first, score column indicates score after each Nørgaard goal.

List of international goals scored by Christian Nørgaard
No.	Date	Venue	Opponent	Score	Result	Competition	Ref.
1	9 October 2021	Zimbru Stadium, Chișinău, Moldova	Moldova	3–0	4–0	2022 FIFA World Cup qualification	
2	26 March 2026	Parken Stadium, Copenhagen, Denmark	North Macedonia	4–0	4–0	2026 FIFA World Cup qualification	

== Honours ==
Brøndby

- Danish Cup: 2017–18

Brentford

- EFL Championship play-offs: 2021

Arsenal

- Premier League: 2025–26
- EFL Cup runner-up: 2025–26
- UEFA Champions League runner-up: 2025–26

Individual

- Brøndby Player of the Year: 2017
- Brentford Supporters' Player of the Year: 2021–22
- Brentford Players' Player of the Year: 2021–22
