= Kevin Schade =

German footballer (born 2001)

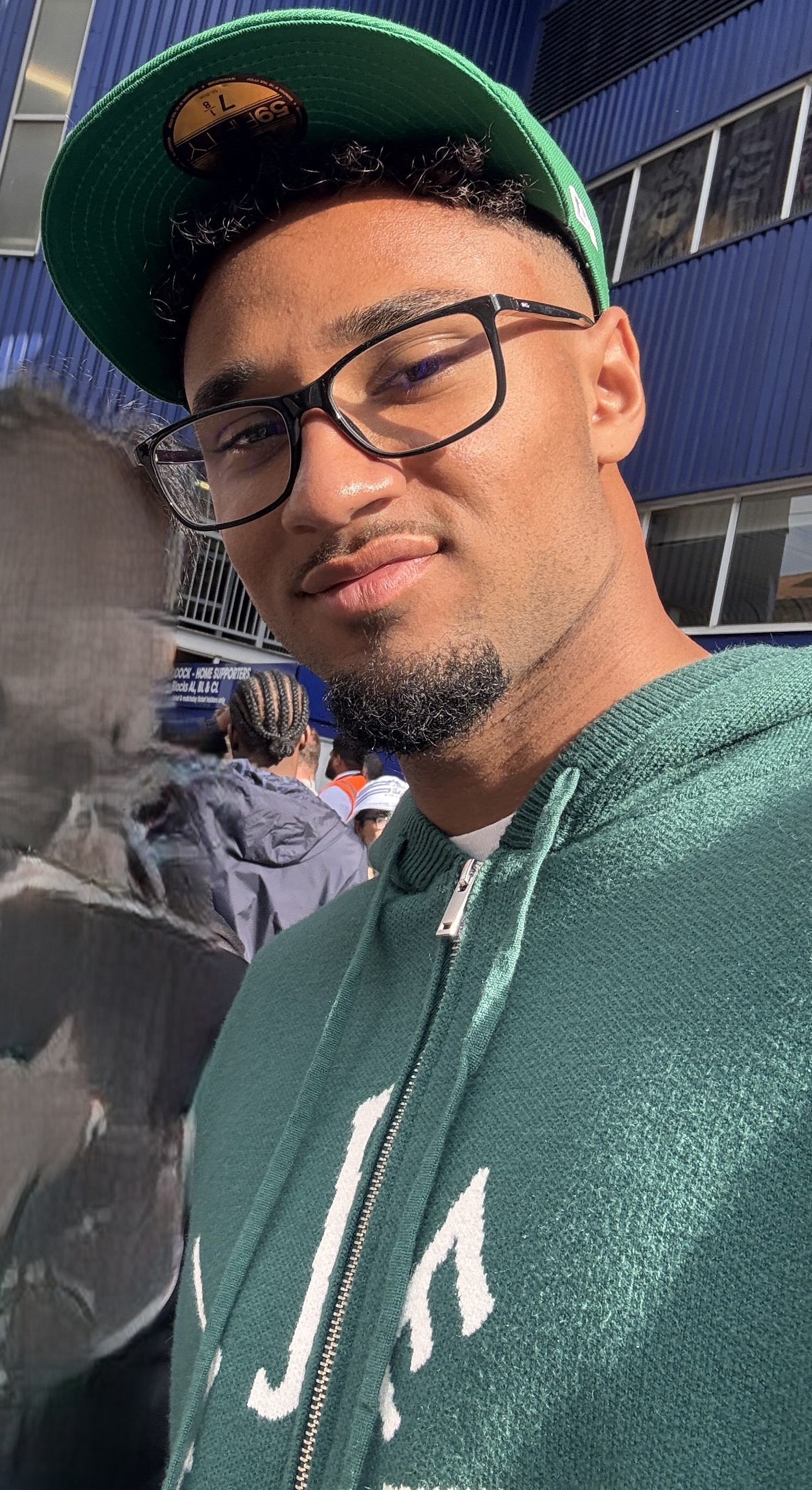
- Schade in 2025

Personal information
- Full name: Kevin Schade
- Date of birth: 27 November 2001 (age 24)
- Place of birth: Potsdam, Germany
- Height: 1.85 m (6 ft 1 in)
- Positions: Winger; forward

Team information
- Current team: Brentford
- Number: 7

Youth career
- 2008–2014: SV Babelsberg
- 2014–2018: Energie Cottbus
- 2018–2019: SC Freiburg

Senior career*
Years	Team	Apps	(Gls)
2019–2021	SC Freiburg II	32	(11)
2021–2023	SC Freiburg	29	(5)
2023	→ Brentford (loan)	18	(0)
2023–	Brentford	94	(24)

International career^{‡}
2019	Germany U18	1	(1)
2019	Germany U19	5	(3)
2020	Germany U20	3	(0)
2021–2023	Germany U21	8	(4)
2023–	Germany	7	(0)
- * Club domestic league appearances and goals as of 16:15, 21 November 2026 (UTC) ‡ National team caps and goals as of 20:35, 27 September 2026 (UTC)

Kevin Schade (German pronunciation: [ˈkɛ.vɪn ˈʃaːdə]; born 27 November 2001) is a German professional footballer who plays as a winger or forward for Premier League club Brentford and the Germany national team.

== Club career ==
=== SC Freiburg ===
Schade joined the SC Freiburg youth system in 2018 after a five-year stint with Energie Cottbus. He made his debut with the club's reserve side in July 2019 against Bahlinger SC, and scored his first goal the following week in a 2–1 defeat to Kickers Offenbach. In December of that year, Schade signed his first professional contract with the club. He made his first-team debut on 21 August 2021, coming on as a 71st-minute substitute for Roland Sallai in a 2–1 victory over Borussia Dortmund. Following his debut, he was quickly earmarked as one of club's bright young talents, seeing use primarily off the bench in his opening season in the Bundesliga. In November 2021, despite attracting interest from such clubs as Liverpool, Schade signed a new contract with the club.

=== Brentford ===
On 4 January 2023, Schade signed for Premier League club Brentford on loan until the end of the 2022–23 season.

On 12 June 2023, Brentford announced they had signed Schade permanently on a five-year contract for a club-record fee of around £22 million. In late September, Schade suffered an adductor injury which required surgery, sidelining him until April 2024.

On 30 November 2024, Schade scored his first hat-trick for Brentford, against Leicester City in the Premier League in a 4–1 win.

On 27 December 2025, Schade scored his second hat-trick for Brentford, against Bournemouth in the Premier League in a 4–1 win.

== International career ==
Born to a German mother and Nigerian father, Schade is eligible to represent both Germany and Nigeria in international competition.

On 17 March 2023, he received his first official call-up to the German senior national team for the friendlies against Peru and Belgium. Schade made his debut for Germany against Peru. In the match against Belgium, he was introduced as a substitute and provided an assist for Serge Gnabry, where in doing so, he demonstrated his passing and pace.

== Career statistics ==
=== Club ===
As of match played 8 November 2026

Appearances and goals by club, season and competition
Club	Season	League			National cup (Note: Includes DFB-Pokal, FA Cup)		League cup (Note: Includes EFL Cup)		Europe		Total	
Club	Season	Division	Apps	Goals	Apps	Goals	Apps	Goals	Apps	Goals	Apps	Goals
SC Freiburg II	2019–20	Regionalliga Südwest	5	1	—		—		—		5	1
SC Freiburg II	2020–21	Regionalliga Südwest	26	8	—		—		—		26	8
SC Freiburg II	2021–22	3. Liga	1	2	—		—		—		1	2
SC Freiburg II	Total		32	11	—		—		—		32	11
SC Freiburg	2020–21	Bundesliga	0	0	0	0	—		—		0	0
SC Freiburg	2021–22	Bundesliga	21	4	3	1	—		—		24	5
SC Freiburg	2022–23	Bundesliga	8	1	0	0	—		4 (Note: Appearances in UEFA Europa League)	0	12	1
SC Freiburg	Total		29	5	3	1	—		4	0	36	6
Brentford (loan)	2022–23	Premier League	18	0	1	0	—		—		19	0
Brentford	2023–24	Premier League	11	2	0	0	1	0	—		12	2
Brentford	2024–25	Premier League	38	11	1	0	4	1	—		43	12
Brentford	2025–26	Premier League	35	8	1	0	3	0	—		39	8
Brentford	2026–27	Premier League	10	3	0	0	2	0	—		12	3
Brentford	Brentford total		112	24	3	0	10	1	—		125	25
Career total			173	40	6	1	10	1	4	0	193	42

=== International ===
As of match played 27 September 2026

Appearances and goals by national team and year
National team	Year	Apps	Goals
Germany	2023	3	0
Germany	2024	1	0
Germany	2025	1	0
Germany	2026	2	0
Total		7	0
