= Mikkel Damsgaard =

Danish footballer (born 2000)

- Damsgaard playing for Brentford in 2026

Personal information
- Full name: Mikkel Krogh Damsgaard
- Date of birth: 3 July 2000 (age 26)
- Place of birth: Jyllinge, Denmark
- Height: 1.80 m (5 ft 11 in)
- Positions: Attacking midfielder; central midfielder

Team information
- Current team: Brentford
- Number: 24

Youth career
- 2005–2013: Jyllinge FC
- 2013–2017: Nordsjælland

Senior career*
| Years | Team | Apps | (Gls) |
| 2017–2020 | Nordsjælland | 84 | (13) |
| 2020–2022 | Sampdoria | 46 | (2) |
| 2022– | Brentford | 128 | (6) |

International career^{‡}
| 2017–2018 | Denmark U18 | 2 | (2) |
| 2018–2019 | Denmark U19 | 6 | (0) |
| 2019–2020 | Denmark U21 | 8 | (1) |
| 2020– | Denmark | 45 | (10) |
- * Club domestic league appearances and goals as of 02:27, 31 October 2026 (UTC) ‡ National team caps and goals as of 22:05, 17 November 2026 (UTC)

Mikkel Krogh Damsgaard (Danish pronunciation: [ˈtɑmsˀˌkɒˀ]; born 3 July 2000) is a Danish professional footballer who plays as an attacking or central midfielder for Premier League club Brentford and the Denmark national team.

== Club career ==
=== Early career ===
Damsgaard started playing football in his hometown Jyllinge, where he played for eight years, with his father as his coach. During a game with Jyllinge, Damsgaard was spotted by a scout from Nordsjælland, who was out actually looking for another player, but ended up contacting Damsgaard. He then joined Nordsjælland as a U12 player on a youth contract until 2020.

=== Nordsjælland ===
On 27 September 2017, Damsgaard made his official debut for Nordsjælland at the age of 17. He played the whole game against Vejgaard BK in a Danish Cup game, making one assist in a 4–0 win at Soffy Road.

He made his Danish Superliga debut for Nordsjælland on 26 November 2017 in a game against AC Horsens in shirt number 27.

On 12 July 2018, Damsgaard made his European debut for Nordsjælland against Cliftonville in a Europa League qualifier.

=== Sampdoria ===
On 6 February 2020, it was confirmed that Damsgaard had signed a four-year contract with Italian club Sampdoria with effect from 1 July 2020. The transfer fee was estimated at €6.7 million (DKK 50 million). On 17 October 2020, he scored his first Serie A goal in a 3–0 victory against Lazio.

=== Brentford ===
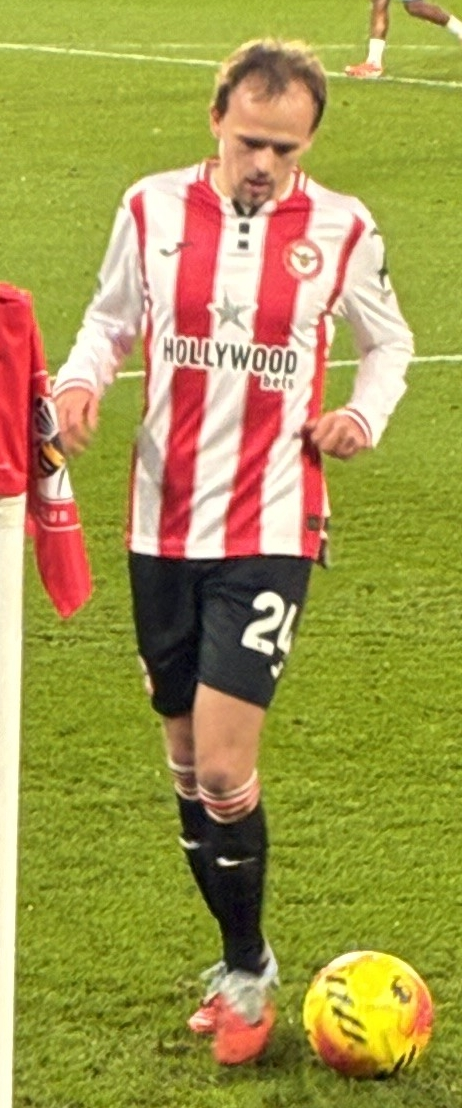
Damsgaard prior to taking a corner kick during a Brentford match in November 2025

On 10 August 2022, Damsgaard joined English club Brentford for a €15 million fee on a five-year deal. On 17 September 2024, Damsgaard scored his first goal for the club when he scored Brentford's second goal in a 3–1 win over Leyton Orient in the EFL Cup. The following month, on 9 November, Damsgaard scored his first Premier League goal in a 3–2 win over Bournemouth. On 22 January 2025, Damsgaard signed a new contract with the club through 2030 with an option for a further year. Damsgaard was voted Supporters' Player of the Year and Players' Player of the Year at Brentford's 2024–25 end-of-year awards.

== International career ==
On 21 June 2021, Damsgaard scored a goal in a 4–1 win over Russia in the UEFA Euro 2020, to become the youngest Danish player to score at the European Championship, aged 20 years 353 days. In the Euro 2020 semi-finals, he scored the first goal against England with the tournament's only freekick goal. However Denmark eventually lost 2–1 after extra-time.

== Career statistics ==
=== Club ===
As of match played 31 October 2026

Appearances and goals by club, season and competition
| Club | Season | League | | | National cup (Note: Includes Danish Cup, Coppa Italia, FA Cup) | | League cup (Note: Includes EFL Cup) | | Europe | | Total | |
| Club | Season | Division | Apps | Goals | Apps | Goals | Apps | Goals | Apps | Goals | Apps | Goals |
|---|---|---|---|---|---|---|---|---|---|---|---|---|
| Nordsjælland | 2017–18 | Danish Superliga | 17 | 1 | 1 | 0 | — | | — | | 18 | 1 |
| Nordsjælland | 2018–19 | Danish Superliga | 32 | 1 | 1 | 0 | — | | 6 (Note: Appearances in UEFA Europa League) | 0 | 39 | 1 |
| Nordsjælland | 2019–20 | Danish Superliga | 35 | 11 | 1 | 0 | — | | — | | 36 | 11 |
| Nordsjælland | Total | | 84 | 13 | 3 | 0 | — | | 6 | 0 | 93 | 13 |
| Sampdoria | 2020–21 | Serie A | 35 | 2 | 2 | 0 | — | | — | | 37 | 2 |
| Sampdoria | 2021–22 | Serie A | 11 | 0 | 1 | 0 | — | | — | | 12 | 0 |
| Sampdoria | Total | | 46 | 2 | 3 | 0 | — | | — | | 49 | 2 |
| Brentford | 2022–23 | Premier League | 26 | 0 | 1 | 0 | 2 | 0 | — | | 29 | 0 |
| Brentford | 2023–24 | Premier League | 23 | 0 | 2 | 0 | 0 | 0 | — | | 25 | 0 |
| Brentford | 2024–25 | Premier League | 38 | 2 | 1 | 0 | 4 | 1 | — | | 43 | 3 |
| Brentford | 2025–26 | Premier League | 33 | 4 | 2 | 0 | 2 | 0 | — | | 37 | 4 |
| Brentford | 2026–27 | Premier League | 8 | 0 | 0 | 0 | 3 | 1 | — | | 11 | 1 |
| Brentford | Total | | 128 | 6 | 6 | 0 | 11 | 2 | — | | 145 | 8 |
| Career total | | | 258 | 21 | 12 | 0 | 11 | 2 | 6 | 0 | 287 | 23 |

=== International ===
As of match played 17 November 2026

Appearances and goals by national team and year
| National team | Year | Apps | Goals |
|---|---|---|---|
| Denmark | 2020 | 1 | 0 |
| Denmark | 2021 | 12 | 4 |
| Denmark | 2022 | 8 | 0 |
| Denmark | 2023 | 4 | 0 |
| Denmark | 2024 | 6 | 0 |
| Denmark | 2025 | 7 | 3 |
| Denmark | 2026 | 7 | 3 |
| Total | | 45 | 10 |

Scores and results list Denmark's goal tally first, score column indicates score after each Damsgaard goal.

List of international goals scored by Mikkel Damsgaard
| No. | Date | Venue | Opponent | Score | Result | Competition |
|---|---|---|---|---|---|---|
| 1 | 28 March 2021 | MCH Arena, Herning, Denmark | Moldova | 2–0 | 8–0 | 2022 FIFA World Cup qualification |
| 2 | 28 March 2021 | MCH Arena, Herning, Denmark | Moldova | 3–0 | 8–0 | 2022 FIFA World Cup qualification |
| 3 | 21 June 2021 | Parken Stadium, Copenhagen, Denmark | Russia | 1–0 | 4–1 | UEFA Euro 2020 |
| 4 | 7 July 2021 | Wembley Stadium, London, England | England | 1–0 | 1–2 (a.e.t.) | UEFA Euro 2020 |
| 5 | 8 September 2025 | Karaiskakis Stadium, Piraeus, Greece | Greece | 1–0 | 3–0 | 2026 FIFA World Cup qualification |
| 6 | 12 October 2025 | Parken Stadium, Copenhagen, Denmark | Greece | 3–0 | 3–1 | 2026 FIFA World Cup qualification |
| 7 | 15 November 2025 | Parken Stadium, Copenhagen, Denmark | Belarus | 1–0 | 2–2 | 2026 FIFA World Cup qualification |
| 8 | 26 March 2026 | Parken Stadium, Copenhagen, Denmark | North Macedonia | 1–0 | 4–0 | 2026 FIFA World Cup qualification |
| 9 | 24 September 2026 | Ullevaal Stadion, Oslo, Norway | Norway | 1–2 | 2–3 | 2026–27 UEFA Nations League A |
| 10 | 1 October 2026 | Parken Stadium, Copenhagen, Denmark | Portugal | 1–1 | 2–4 | 2026–27 UEFA Nations League A |

== Honours ==
Individual

- Brentford Player of the Year: 2024–25
