= Thomas Frank (football manager) =

Danish football manager (born 1973)

Personal information
- Full name: Thomas Frank
- Date of birth: 9 October 1973 (age 53)
- Place of birth: Frederiksværk, Denmark
- Position: Midfielder

Team information
- Current team: Crystal Palace (manager)

Senior career*
| Years | Team | Apps | (Gls) |
| 1995–2004 | Frederiksværk | | |

Managerial career
- 2008–2011: Denmark U16
- 2008–2012: Denmark U17
- 2012–2013: Denmark U19
- 2013–2016: Brøndby
- 2018–2025: Brentford
- 2025–2026: Tottenham Hotspur
- 2026–: Crystal Palace
- * Club domestic league appearances and goals

Thomas Frank (Danish pronunciation: [ˈtsʰʌmæs ˈfʁɑŋk]; born 9 October 1973) is a Danish professional football manager who is the manager of Premier League club Crystal Palace.

After 18 years in youth coaching, which included spells as manager of multiple Danish national youth teams, Frank became a senior manager with Brøndby in 2013. After his departure in 2016, he moved to English club Brentford as assistant head coach, and was promoted into the role of head coach in October 2018. At the end of the 2020–21 season, Frank became only the second Brentford head coach or manager to achieve promotion to the top-flight of English football.

Over the following four seasons, Frank guided Brentford into becoming a mainstay in the Premier League, on a limited budget. In June 2025, Frank departed from Brentford after seven years at the club to join Tottenham Hotspur as head coach. After eight months in charge, Frank was dismissed by Tottenham Hotspur in February 2026 with the club 16th in the Premier League. He was appointed manager of Crystal Palace in November 2026.

== Managerial career ==
=== Denmark ===
After a short playing career in amateur football as a midfielder, Frank began his coaching career with the U8 team at hometown club Frederiksværk in 1995. He moved to the U12 team two years later and then on to Hvidovre in 1998, B93 in 2004 and Lyngby in 2006. In July 2008, Frank was appointed manager of the Denmark national U16 and U17 teams. In 2011, he led the U17 team to the European U17 Championship finals for the first time in eight years (advancing to the semi-finals before losing 2–0 to Germany) and to its first U17 World Cup, in which the team was eliminated in the group stage. Frank was promoted to the Denmark U19 manager's job in July 2012, but he failed to qualify for the 2013 European U19 Championship. During his time working for the DBU, Frank also acted as manager during an unofficial U18 match in 2010 and presided over one U20 match in 2012, covering for Morten Wieghorst. He also served as assistant for the U18, U17, U16 and women's U17 teams on an ad-hoc basis.

=== Brøndby ===
Frank was named as manager of Danish Superliga club Brøndby on 10 June 2013, his first position in senior football, replacing Auri Skarbalius, who was dismissed. While Brøndby has historically been one of the most successful teams in Denmark, they had recently struggled, finishing just 5 points above relegated AC Horsens the season prior. Frank achieved fourth and third-place finishes in the 2013–14 and 2014–15 seasons, high enough to qualify for the Europa League qualification stages, but was unable to lead the club into the group stage in either season. Frank resigned on 9 March 2016 after the so called 'Oscar-Gate', where Brøndby chairman Jan Bech Andersen used a pseudonym on the online supporters' forum 'Sydsiden Online' to criticize Frank and the Brøndby sporting director Per Rud. He was replaced by Auri Skarbalius who took over as the interim coach.

=== Brentford ===
On 9 December 2016, Frank moved to England to join Championship club Brentford as assistant head coach alongside Richard O'Kelly, under head coach Dean Smith. He signed a two-and-a-half year contract. When he signed for Brentford, he also had an offer to become the head coach from an unnamed Danish club. In addition to being a "bridge between the players and the coaching staff", co-director of football Rasmus Ankersen revealed that Frank would also "look after the players between the B team and the first team and make sure there is a pathway for them and take care of their development". In February 2018, he signed a new contract, which would run until the end of the 2019–20 season.

On 16 October 2018, after the departure of head coach Dean Smith, it was announced that Frank had been promoted into the role. He took over a club rocked by the recent death of technical director Robert Rowan and endured a tough start to his tenure, winning just one of his first 10 games, before stabilising the team's form after a change to a 3–4–3 formation. Seven points from a possible nine in January 2019 saw him nominated for the Championship Manager of the Month award. He guided Brentford to the fifth round of the FA Cup and an eleventh-place finish in the Championship at the end of the 2018–19 season.

After an uneven start to the 2019–20 season and switching back to a 4–3–3 formation, 10 points from five matches in October 2019 saw Frank nominated for the Championship Manager of the Month award. With Brentford in the play-off places, Frank and his assistant Brian Riemer signed new three-and-a-half year contracts in January 2020. After the season restart, an unbeaten June won Frank the Championship Manager of the Month award and he oversaw Brentford's run to the 2020 Championship play-off final, which Brentford lost 2–1 to West London rivals Fulham.

Frank reached 100 matches as Brentford manager in late October 2020; at the time he had the highest winning percentage of any Brentford manager with a tenure of 100 matches or more. In the midst of a 21-match unbeaten run in league matches, five wins in December 2020 won Frank the Championship Manager of the Month award. Following a run to the club's first ever appearance in the semi-finals of the EFL Cup, Frank managed Brentford to a second-successive third-place Championship finish during the 2020–21 regular season. The team went one better than the previous season during the play-offs, winning promotion to the Premier League after a 2–0 victory over Swansea City in the 2021 Championship play-off final. The promotion made him the second Brentford head coach to win promotion to the top-tier, after Harry Curtis won the Second Division championship in 1934–35. During the 2020–21 season, Frank was named the 2020 DBU Coach of the Year and was nominated for the 2021 London Football Awards Manager of the Year award.

Halfway through the 2021–22 season – with Brentford placed 14th in the Premier League table, nine points clear of the relegation zone – Frank and his assistant Brian Riemer signed three-and-a-half year contract extensions on 21 January 2022. In March 2022, Frank was nominated for a second successive DBU Coach of the Year award. An unbeaten April 2022 saw Frank nominated for the Premier League Manager of the Month award and the following month, he was nominated for the Premier League Manager of the Season award. He oversaw a final Premier League placing of 13th. With 10% less possession per match compared to the previous season in the Championship, Frank and the coaching staff adjusted the team's style of play, emphasising scoring from dead-ball situations and counter attacks. F.C. Copenhagen's recent "stats against the top teams in Europe" was an inspiration defensively.

In October 2022, Frank achieved the feat of having won more of his first 200 matches than any Brentford head coach or manager to also reach 200. Frank's assistant Brian Riemer left his role on 2 December 2022 and was replaced three days later by Claus Nørgaard, who had previously worked as Frank's assistant at the DBU and Brøndby IF. On Christmas Eve 2022, Frank signed a new four-and-a-half year contract. Unbeaten form around the turn of the year saw Frank nominated for the November 2022, December 2022 and January 2023 Premier League Manager of the Month awards. In March 2023, Frank won the 2022 DBU Coach of the Year award. Brentford went into the final day of the season in contention to finish in the final European place, but despite a 1–0 victory over Manchester City (completing a season double over the Premier League champions), results elsewhere saw the club finish ninth.

Frank guided an injury-ravaged squad to a 16th place finish in the 2023–24 season. Brentford's Premier League status was assured with four matches to play, but despite the low placing, the club ended the season 13 points above the relegation zone. The squad suffered 21 injuries, underwent 11 surgeries and due to an FA-imposed suspension, was without Ivan Toney (the club's leading goalscorer in the past three seasons) until the final four months of the season. With two league matches to play in the 2024–25 season, Brentford remained in contention for a European place and Frank was nominated for the Premier League Manager of the Season award. The club ended the season with a 10th place finish.

=== Tottenham Hotspur ===
On 12 June 2025, Frank replaced Ange Postecoglou as the head coach of Tottenham Hotspur, signing a contract until 2028. Brentford received £10 million in compensation. Frank managed his first official game for Tottenham in the 2025 UEFA Super Cup on 13 August 2025, losing to Paris Saint-Germain 4–3 on penalties following a 2–2 draw in normal time. He won his first league game in charge, defeating Burnley 3–0 in Tottenham's season opener.

By November, Tottenham's form had taken a significant turn for the worse, and Frank's position had begun to come under pressure. In particular, the team's "toothless" attacking performances drew criticism. On 8 January 2026, the pressure intensified after a 3–2 defeat to Bournemouth left the club in 14th place. Before the game, Frank had been photographed holding an Arsenal branded coffee cup. He subsequently said that did not notice the Arsenal logo on the cup when it was handed to him. After a home defeat by Newcastle meant eight league games without a win, Frank was dismissed on 11 February 2026, with the club 16th in the Premier League, five points above the relegation places. Igor Tudor followed as manager.

Frank's league win rate of 26.9% was the worst of any Tottenham manager in the Premier League era. Media assessment of his time as Tottenham manager was critical of his playing style, though noted that his job had been made more difficult through failures in the transfer market and injuries to key players.

=== Crystal Palace ===
On 16 November 2026, Frank was appointed manager of Crystal Palace, replacing Pierre Sage. Frank's first managerial game for Crystal Palace came on 21 November 2026 against Coventry City, which saw his club be defeated 3–2, due to conceding a late own goal.

== Personal life ==
Frank is married and has three children. He was awarded a BA in Physical Education by the Copenhagen Institute of Sports Medicine in 1999 and studied sport psychology and coaching-based leadership at the same institution between 2002 and 2005. He also worked at a kindergarten and later taught at Ishøj Business College in 2004. Prior to moving to London in December 2016, Frank and his family lived in Hvidovre. Frank was a member of the BBC Sport commentary team at Euro 2024 and the FIFA 2026 World Cup. He is also a pundit on Match of the Day.

== Managerial statistics ==
As of 21 November 2026

Managerial record by team and tenure
| Team | From | To | Record | | | | |
| Team | From | To | P | W | D | L | Win % |
|---|---|---|---|---|---|---|---|
| Denmark U16 | 1 July 2008 | 2011 | 25 | 10 | 3 | 12 | 40.0 |
| Denmark U17 | 1 July 2008 | July 2012 | 66 | 38 | 14 | 14 | 57.6 |
| Denmark U19 | July 2012 | June 2013 | 15 | 10 | 1 | 4 | 66.7 |
| Brøndby | 10 June 2013 | 9 March 2016 | 97 | 42 | 29 | 26 | 43.3 |
| Brentford | 16 October 2018 | 12 June 2025 | 317 | 132 | 77 | 108 | 41.6 |
| Tottenham Hotspur | 12 June 2025 | 11 February 2026 | 38 | 13 | 11 | 14 | 34.2 |
| Crystal Palace | 16 November 2026 | present | 1 | 0 | 0 | 1 | 0.0 |
| Total | | | 558 | 245 | 135 | 178 | 43.9 |

== Honours ==
Denmark U17

- Syrenka Cup: 2010

Brentford

- EFL Championship play-offs: 2021

Individual

- London Football Awards Manager of the Year: 2020
- DBU Coach of the Year: 2020, 2022
- EFL Championship Manager of the Month: June 2020, December 2020
