= Halil Dervişoğlu =

Turkish-Dutch footballer (born 1999)

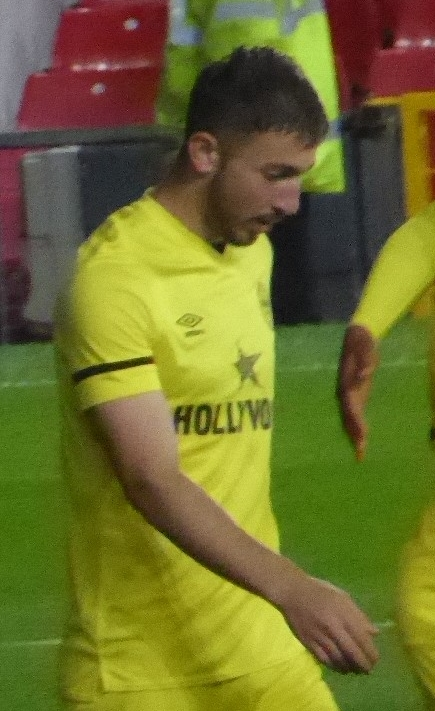
- Dervişoğlu playing for Brentford in 2021

Personal information
- Full name: Halil İbrahim Dervişoğlu
- Date of birth: 8 December 1999 (age 26)
- Place of birth: Rotterdam, Netherlands
- Height: 1.83 m (6 ft 0 in)
- Position: Forward

Team information
- Current team: Gaziantep (on loan from Galatasaray)
- Number: 28

Youth career
- 2009–2018: Sparta Rotterdam

Senior career*
Years	Team	Apps	(Gls)
2017–2018	Jong Sparta	36	(25)
2018–2020	Sparta Rotterdam	51	(15)
2020–2023	Brentford	5	(0)
2020	→ Twente (loan)	9	(0)
2021	→ Galatasaray (loan)	12	(3)
2021–2022	→ Galatasaray (loan)	28	(4)
2022–2023	→ Burnley (loan)	8	(1)
2023–	Galatasaray	14	(0)
2024	→ Hatayspor (loan)	11	(0)
2024–2025	→ Gaziantep (loan)	29	(3)
2025–2026	→ Çaykur Rizespor (loan)	21	(1)
2026–	→ Gaziantep (loan)	1	(0)

International career^{‡}
2018	Turkey U19	2	(0)
2018–2020	Turkey U21	11	(8)
2021–2023	Turkey	16	(6)
- * Club domestic league appearances and goals as of 23:10, 16 August 2026 (UTC) ‡ National team caps and goals as of 22:00, 8 September 2023 (UTC)

Halil İbrahim Dervişoğlu (born 8 December 1999) is a professional footballer who plays as a forward for Süper Lig club Gaziantep, on loan from Süper Lig club Galatasaray. Born in the Netherlands, he plays for the Turkey national team.

Dervişoğlu began his career in his native Netherlands with Sparta Rotterdam and transferred to Brentford in 2020. A fringe player during 3 1/2 years in England, he transferred to Turkish club Galatasaray in 2023, for whom he had played twice previously on loan away from Brentford.

== Club career ==
=== Sparta Rotterdam ===
Dervişoğlu joined the Sparta Rotterdam academy at the age of 10 and broke into the club's reserve team early in the 2017–18 Tweede Divisie season. 21 goals in 26 appearances saw him sign a contract extension in May 2018 and he made his maiden first team appearances during the club's unsuccessful Eredivisie relegation playoff campaign. Dervişoğlu was a regular in the first team squad during the 2018–19 Eerste Divisie season and he helped the club to promotion back to the Eredivisie through the end-of-season playoffs.

In August 2019, Dervişoğlu signed a pre-contract to depart Het Kasteel on 1 January 2020. He made 19 appearances and scored five goals during the first half of the 2019–20 season and departed the club having made 58 appearances and scored 16 goals while a member of the first team squad.

=== Brentford ===
==== 2019–20 season ====
On 9 August 2019, Dervişoğlu signed a pre-contract to join English Championship club Brentford on 1 January 2020, for a reported €3 million fee. He signed a 4 1/2-year contract and was unveiled as a Brentford player on 3 January 2020. Down the pecking order for the attacking positions, Dervişoğlu made 7 appearances during the remainder of the 2019–20 season, which ended with defeat in the 2020 Championship play-off final.

==== 2020–21 season and loans to Twente and Galatasaray ====
After making just one EFL Cup substitute appearance during the first month of the 2020–21 season and well behind Marcus Forss and new signing Ivan Toney in the centre forward pecking order, Dervişoğlu joined Eredivisie club FC Twente on loan until the end of the 2020–21 season. After making 10 appearances without scoring, he was recalled by Brentford on the first day of the mid-season transfer window. Dervişoğlu scored his first goal for the club on his first appearance back, with the opener in a 2–1 FA Cup third round win over Middlesbrough on 9 January 2021. It proved to be his only appearance before he departed to join Turkish Süper Lig club Galatasaray on loan two weeks later.

After a slow start to his Galatasaray spell due to testing positive for COVID-19, Dervişoğlu broke from his substitute role into the starting lineup late in the season and scored three goals in the final four matches, though the club ultimately missed out on the Süper Lig title by one goal. He finished his spell with 12 appearances, three goals and in his absence, Brentford won promotion to the Premier League after victory in the 2021 Championship play-off final.

==== 2021–2023 and loans to Galatasaray and Burnley ====
Despite being named in each of head coach Thomas Frank's first four matchday squads of the 2021–22 season, Dervişoğlu made just one appearance, with a start in a 3–1 EFL Cup second round win over Forest Green Rovers. On 1 September 2021, for reasons of it being "a logical progression" for Dervişoğlu "to continue to play and develop", he rejoined Galatasaray on loan until the end of the 2021–22 season. He made 33 appearances and scored five goals during a mid-table season.

Dervişoğlu made just one seven-minute substitute cameo during the opening month of the 2022–23 Premier League season and well down the attacking pecking order, he joined Championship club Burnley on a season-long loan on the final day of the summer transfer window. Dervişoğlu played just 71 minutes across 9 substitute appearances in all competitions during his spell, with his only goal coming with an injury time winner in a 3–2 victory over Rotherham United on 2 November 2022.

Following a goalscoring appearance in Brentford's opening 2023–24 pre-season friendly, Dervişoğlu transferred out of the club. He made just 12 appearances, scoring one goal, during his 3 1/2 years with Brentford. He ended his career with the club as its leading international goalscorer, with six goals.

=== Return to Galatasaray ===
On 16 July 2023, Dervişoğlu transferred to Süper Lig club Galatasaray on a permanent basis. He signed a four-year contract for a €500,000 fee. On 9 February 2024, after scoring four goals in 20 predominantly substitute appearances, he joined Süper Lig club Hatayspor on loan until the end of the 2023–24 season. Dervişoğlu made 11 appearances without scoring for the relegation-threatened club.

After failing to win a call into a matchday squad during the first five weeks of the 2024–25 season, Dervişoğlu joined Süper Lig club Gaziantep on loan until the end of the season. He made 33 appearances and scored four goals during his spell. On 8 July 2025, Dervişoğlu joined Süper Lig club Çaykur Rizespor on loan for the duration of the 2025–26 season. He made 26 appearances and scored five goals during a mid-table season, with four of the goals coming in a 5–2 Turkish Cup first round victory over Gaziantep on 17 December 2025.

On 14 August 2025, Dervişoğlu returned to Gaziantep on loan until the end of the 2026–27 season.

== International career ==
Born in the Netherlands of Turkish descent, Dervişoğlu was eligible to represent the Netherlands or Turkey at international level. Capped by Turkey at U19 and U21 level, Dervişoğlu was named in the senior team's Euro 2020 squad and made his senior international debut in a pre-tournament friendly versus Azerbaijan on 27 May 2021. He started the match and scored the opening goal in the 2–1 victory. Dervişoğlu made two substitute appearances at Euro 2020, prior to Turkey's group stage exit.

== Personal life ==
Dervişoğlu's cousin Mutlu is a former footballer and current coach.

== Career statistics ==
=== Club ===
As of match played 15 August 2026

Appearances and goals by club, season and competition
Club	Season	League			National cup (Note: Includes KNVB Cup, FA Cup, Turkish Cup)		League cup (Note: Includes EFL Cup)		Europe		Other		Total	
Club	Season	Division	Apps	Goals	Apps	Goals	Apps	Goals	Apps	Goals	Apps	Goals	Apps	Goals
Jong Sparta Rotterdam	2017–18	Tweede Divisie	26	21	—		—		—		—		26	21
Jong Sparta Rotterdam	2018–19	Tweede Divisie	10	4	—		—		—		—		10	4
Jong Sparta Rotterdam	Total		36	25	—		—		—		—		36	25
Sparta Rotterdam	2017–18	Eredivisie	0	0	0	0	—		—		2 (Note: Appearances in Eredivisie promotion/relegation play-offs)	0	2	0
Sparta Rotterdam	2018–19	Eerste Divisie	34	10	1	0	—		—		2	1	37	11
Sparta Rotterdam	2019–20	Eredivisie	17	5	2	0	—		—		—		19	5
Sparta Rotterdam	Total		51	15	3	0	—		—		4	1	58	16
Brentford	2019–20	Championship	4	0	2	0	—		—		1 (Note: Appearances in Championship play-offs)	0	7	0
Brentford	2020–21	Championship	0	0	1	1	1	0	—		—		2	1
Brentford	2021–22	Premier League	0	0	—		1	0	—		—		1	0
Brentford	2022–23	Premier League	1	0	—		1	0	—		—		2	0
Brentford	Total		5	0	3	1	3	0	—		1	0	12	1
FC Twente (loan)	2020–21	Eredivisie	9	0	1	0	—		—		—		10	0
Galatasaray (loan)	2020–21	Süper Lig	12	3	0	0	—		—		—		12	3
Galatasaray (loan)	2021–22	Süper Lig	28	4	1	1	—		4 (Note: Appearances in Europa League)	0	—		33	5
Burnley (loan)	2022–23	Championship	8	1	1	0	—		—		—		9	1
Galatasaray	2023–24	Süper Lig	14	0	2	2	—		4 (Note: Appearances in Champions League)	2	0	0	20	4
Hatayspor (loan)	2023–24	Süper Lig	11	0	—		—		—		—		11	0
Gaziantep (loan)	2024–25	Süper Lig	29	3	4	0	—		—		—		33	3
Çaykur Rizespor (loan)	2025–26	Süper Lig	21	1	5	4	—		—		—		26	5
Gaziantep (loan)	2026–27	Süper Lig	1	0	0	0	—		—		—		1	0
Career total			225	52	20	8	3	0	8	2	5	1	261	63

=== International ===
As of match played 8 September 2023

Appearances and goals by national team and year
National team	Year	Apps	Goals
Turkey	2021	9	4
Turkey	2022	6	2
Turkey	2023	1	0
Total		16	6

Scores and results list Turkey's goal tally first, score column indicates score after each Dervişoğlu goal.

List of international goals scored by Halil Dervişoğlu
No.	Date	Venue	Opponent	Score	Result	Competition	Ref.
1	27 May 2021	Bahçeşehir Okulları Stadium, Alanya, Turkey	Azerbaijan	1–1	2–1	Friendly	
2	4 September 2021	Victoria Stadium, Gibraltar	Gibraltar	1–0	3–0	2022 FIFA World Cup qualification	
3	13 November 2021	Başakşehir Fatih Terim Stadium, Istanbul, Turkey	Gibraltar	2–0	6–0	2022 FIFA World Cup qualification	
4	13 November 2021	Başakşehir Fatih Terim Stadium, Istanbul, Turkey	Gibraltar	3–0	6–0	2022 FIFA World Cup qualification	
5	4 June 2022	Başakşehir Fatih Terim Stadium, Istanbul, Turkey	Faroe Islands	2–0	4–0	2022–23 UEFA Nations League C	
6	7 June 2022	LFF Stadium, Vilnius, Lithuania	Lithuania	6–0	6–0	2022–23 UEFA Nations League C	

== Honours ==
Sparta Rotterdam

- Eerste Divisie promotion playoffs: 2019
