= 2020 EFL Championship play-off final =

Association football match in London

- Wembley Stadium in London hosted the final.
- Event: 2019–20 EFL Championship
Brentford	Fulham
1	2
- After extra time
- Date: 4 August 2020
- Venue: Wembley Stadium, London
- Man of the Match: Joe Bryan (Fulham)
- Referee: Martin Atkinson
- Attendance: 0 (Note: The final was played behind closed doors due to the COVID-19 pandemic in the United Kingdom.)

The 2020 EFL Championship play-off final was an association football match which was played on 4 August 2020 at Wembley Stadium, London, between Brentford and Fulham, a West London derby. The match was to determine the third and final team to gain promotion from the EFL Championship, the second tier of English football, to the FA Premier League. The top two teams of the 2019–20 EFL Championship season gained automatic promotion to the Premier League, while the clubs placed from third to sixth place in the table took part in play-off semi-finals; Brentford ended the season in third position while Fulham finished fourth. The winners of these semi-finals competed for the final place for the 2020–21 season in the Premier League. Cardiff City and Swansea City were the losing semi-finalists.

Fulham had been relegated to the Championship the previous season while Brentford had not played at the highest level of English league football for 73 years. The 2020 final was played behind closed doors as a result of the COVID-19 pandemic in the United Kingdom which had delayed the conclusion of the regular league season by more than three months. Refereed by Martin Atkinson, the game was goalless after 90 minutes, sending it into extra time. Fulham's Joe Bryan scored the opening goal in the 105th minute with a long-range free kick and doubled the lead twelve minutes later after build-up play with the league top scorer Aleksandar Mitrović who had come on as a substitute. Henrik Dalsgaard scored an injury-time consolation goal for Brentford as the match ended 2–1 to Fulham, seeing them return to the Premier League on their first attempt.

== Route to the final ==
EFL Championship final table, leading positions
Pos	Team	Pld	W	D	L	GF	GA	GD	Pts
1	Leeds United	46	28	9	9	77	35	+42	93
2	West Bromwich Albion	46	22	17	7	77	45	+32	83
3	Brentford	46	24	9	13	80	38	+42	81
4	Fulham	46	23	12	11	64	48	+16	81
5	Cardiff City	46	19	16	11	68	58	+10	73
6	Swansea City	46	18	16	12	62	53	+9	70

Brentford finished the regular 2019–20 season in third place in the EFL Championship, the second tier of the English football league system, one place ahead of Fulham on goal difference. Both therefore missed out on the two automatic places for promotion to the Premier League and instead took part in the play-offs to determine the third promoted team. They finished two points behind West Bromwich Albion (who were promoted in second place) and 12 behind league winners Leeds United. The season was affected by the COVID-19 pandemic in the United Kingdom, with the Championship being suspended for more than three months between early March and late June. Upon the resumption of the league, the remaining matches were played behind closed doors.

Fulham finished the regular season with a streak of seven games unbeaten which started with a 2–1 away win against Queens Park Rangers on 30 June. Fulham's opponents in the play-off semi-final were Cardiff City, with the first leg being played at the Cardiff City Stadium on 27 July 2020. Championship top scorer Aleksandar Mitrović was unavailable for Fulham as he was suffering from a hamstring injury. Tom Cairney hit the post for the visitors in an even but goalless first half, but Josh Onomah put them ahead four minutes into the second, beating three defenders before striking the ball past Alex Smithies in the Cardiff goal. The remainder of the match was dominated by Fulham who doubled their lead in injury time with Neeskens Kebano scoring directly from a free kick. The second leg took place at Craven Cottage three days later. Curtis Nelson put the Welsh side ahead with a headed goal after eight minutes but Kebano equalised 24 seconds later, converting a cross from Bobby Decordova-Reid from 12 yards (11 m). Two minutes into the second half, Lee Tomlin, who had come on at half time as a substitute, scored Cardiff's second with a volley. Despite losing the second leg 2–1, Fulham won 3–2 on aggregate to qualify for the final.

Brentford went on an eight-game win streak towards the end of the season, starting with a 5–0 home win against Sheffield Wednesday on 7 March and ending with a 1–0 home win against Preston North End on 15 July, but lost their last two matches before the play-off semi-final. In their play-off semi-final, Brentford faced Swansea City with the first leg being played at the Liberty Stadium in Swansea on 26 July 2020. After a goalless first half, Rico Henry was sent off with a straight red card for a foul on Connor Roberts mid-way through the second half. With nine minutes remaining, a half-volley from André Ayew gave the home team a 1–0 lead which they held on to until the final whistle. The second leg of the semi-final was played three days later at Griffin Park, and was the last match to be hosted at the stadium before Brentford's move to the Brentford Community Stadium. Ollie Watkins levelled the tie after eleven minutes with his 26th goal of the season, and Emiliano Marcondes scored with a header to put Brentford 2–1 ahead on aggregate. Bryan Mbeumo scored with a volley from Henry cross one minute after half-time before Rhian Brewster scored for Swansea with twelve minutes remaining. No further goals were scored and Brentford progressed to the final with a 3–2 aggregate victory.

Brentford			Round	Fulham
Opponent	Result	Legs	Semi-finals	Opponent	Result	Legs
Swansea City	3–2	0–1 away; 3–1 home		Cardiff City	3–2	2–0 away; 1–2 home

== Match ==
=== Background ===
Fulham had last taken part in a play-off final when they beat Aston Villa in the 2018 final and spent one season in the Premier League before being relegated. Brentford had failed to win in three play-off final attempts: they lost the 1997 Football League Second Division play-off final 1–0 against Crewe Alexandra, were defeated 2–0 in the 2002 Football League Second Division play-off final by Stoke City, and lost to Yeovil Town in the 2013 Football League One play-off final 2–1. They had also lost in five play-off semi-finals. Brentford had not played in the top flight of English football for 73 years, having been relegated to the second tier in their 1946–47 season. Fulham lost both West London derbies played between the clubs during the regular season, suffering a 1–0 defeat at Griffin Park in December 2019, and losing 2–0 at Craven Cottage the following June. Brentford's Watkins and Fulham's Mitrović tied for the distinction as Championship top scorers with 26 goals each. According to bookmakers, Brentford went into the final as favourites. The match was broadcast live in the UK on Sky Sports Football, Sky Sports Main Event and Sky Sports Ultra HD.

The referee for the match was Martin Atkinson, with assistants Lee Betts and Constantine Hatzidakis. Peter Banks acted as the fourth official. It was reported by Deloitte that the game was worth around £160 million to Brentford should they win, or £135 million to Fulham if they were victorious. Brentford made just one change to the starting eleven which beat Swansea in the second leg of the play-off semi-final, with Josh Dasilva replacing Marcondes in midfield, the latter being named as a substitute. Denis Odoi and Aboubakar Kamara came in for Cyrus Christie and Anthony Knockaert in Fulham's starting line-up, and Mitrović was selected on the bench. Faryl Smith sang the national anthem from outside the stadium before the match.

=== First half ===
After the teams had taken a knee in honour of the Black Lives Matter movement, Fulham kicked off the match behind closed doors. After two minutes, a Brentford free kick enabled Henrik Dalsgaard to shoot but his strike was blocked. Three minutes later, a Fulham break saw De Cordova-Reid pass to Onomah whose low shot was saved by David Raya in the Brentford goal. On seven minutes, Michael Hector fouled Saïd Benrahma on the edge of the Fulham penalty area, but the resulting free kick was eventually gathered by Marek Rodák. In the 14th minute, a cross from Kebano was deflected out for a corner which was cleared by Pontus Jansson. Four minutes later, Raya made a one-handed save to deny Onomah from opening the scoring for Fulham. On 20 minutes, De Cordova-Reid's shot was deflected out for a corner, and six minutes later the game was paused for a drinks break. In the 29th minute, Harrison Reed was shown the first yellow card of the game after a foul on Christian Nørgaard. Odoi's 41st minute shot was blocked before Raya caught a Fulham cross three minutes later, and the half ended goalless.

=== Second half ===
No changes to either side were made during the interval and Brentford kicked the second half off. A minute in, Brentford's Henry pulled down De Cordova-Reid, conceding a free kick which Kebano struck into the side netting. In the 53rd minute, Benrahma made a run into the penalty area and his cross was blocked, with appeals for a free kick denied. Brentford then began to exert some pressure with chances falling to Mathias Jensen and Mbeumo but without scoring. In the 58th minute, De Cordova-Reid's shot went outside of the right-hand post of Brentford's goal. Two minutes later, Mbeumo was replaced by Marcondes in the first substitution of the game. Midway through the second half, a long ball from Fulham's Jensen was headed behind by Odoi, and Ethan Pinnock's header from the ensuing corner was cleared behind by Joe Bryan. From the set piece, Cairney became the second player to be booked, after a foul on Benrahma. Marcondes' strike from the free kick went high over the bar, and the second half drinks break was taken shortly after. In the 70th minute, Watkins received a pass from Jensen and struck a shot from the edge of the box toward the top corner which was tipped over by Rodák. Fulham made their first substitution of the game in the 81st minute with Knockaert coming on to replace Kebano. Dalsgaard's shot in the 83rd minute went over the Fulham crossbar and a minute later, Brentford made their second change, with Sergi Canós replacing Dasilva. Onomah then struck a shot over the Brentford bar before Jensen was shown a yellow card for a foul on Knockaert. In the final minute of regular time, Benrahma's free kick was off-target and in injury time, Mitrović came on to replace De Cordova-Reid for Fulham as the game went into extra time having ended goalless.

=== Extra time ===
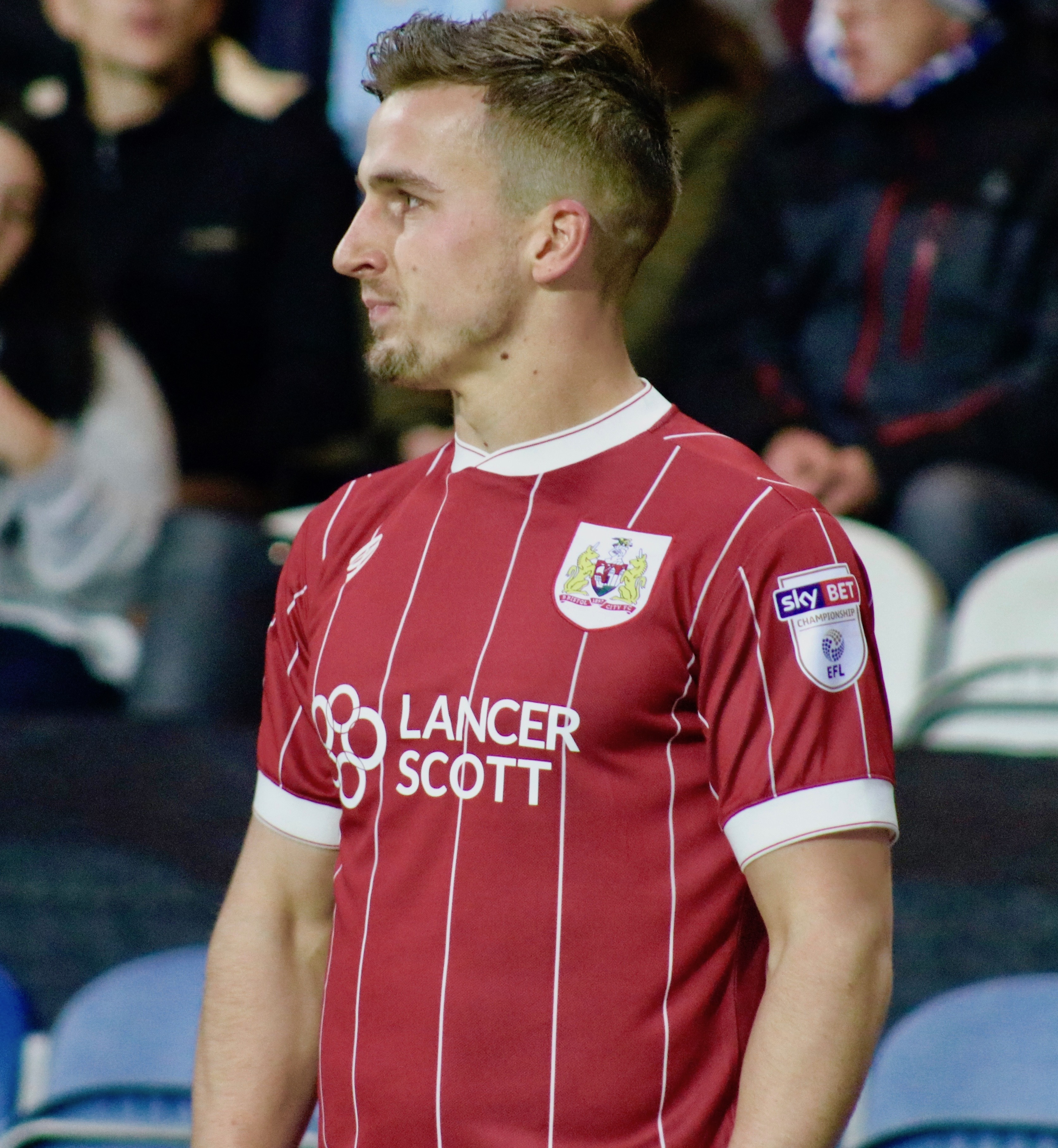
Joe Bryan (pictured in 2017) scored both of Fulham's goals in extra time.

No changes were made to either side between the end of regular time and the start of extra time. Two minutes into the first half, Canós crossed for Watkins whose shot went wide of the Fulham post. On four minutes, Kamara's shot from distance was comfortably saved by Raya in the Brentford goal. In the sixth minute, Henry's cross was struck by Jansen but deflected away. Hector then became the third Fulham player to be booked after a foul on Nørgaard and four minutes later Knockaert was shown the yellow card after he bought Henry down. A minute before half-time, Nørgaard was booked for a foul and Mitrović received a yellow card for a foul on Marcondes. In the last minute of the first half of extra time, the deadlock was broken: Bryan saw the Brentford goalkeeper Raya was off his goal-line so struck a 40-yard (37 m) free kick over him into the net, and the half ended 1–0 to Fulham. During the half-time period, Halil Dervişoğlu and Tariqe Fosu came on for Brentford, replacing Jensen and Henry, while Fulham's Ivan Cavaleiro was brought on in place of Kamara. Two minutes into the second period of extra time, Dervişoğlu's attempt to score from a Canós cross was saved by Rodák. With nine minutes of the second half remaining, further substitutions were made: Fulham's Christie and Maxime Le Marchand coming on to replace Onomah and Odoi. A foul by Fulham's Christie resulted in a Benrahma free kick which struck the defensive wall, followed by Nørgaard's cross being smothered by Rodák. In the 117th minute of the match, Pinnock's volley was caught by Rodák and two minutes later Bryan doubled his and Fulham's tally, scoring following a one-two with Mitrović. Brentford's Dalsgaard then headed Canós' cross over the Fulham bar. Four minutes of injury time were indicated and two minutes in, Fulham's Cavaleiro was booked for a foul on Fosu before Dalsgaard scored for Brentford from a Nørgaard header from 8 yards (7.3 m) with less than a minute remaining; Rodák became the seventh Fulham player to be booked for subsequent time-wasting and the match ended 2–1 to Fulham, securing their promotion back to the Premier League on their first attempt.

=== Details ===
4 August 2020
19:45 BST

Brentford	1–2 (a.e.t.)	Fulham
Dalsgaard 120+4'	Report	Bryan 105', 117'

Wembley Stadium, London
Attendance: 0
Referee: Martin Atkinson

Brentford	Fulham

GK	1	(Spain) David Raya
RB	22	(Denmark) Henrik Dalsgaard
CB	18	(Sweden) Pontus Jansson (c)
CB	5	(England) Ethan Pinnock
LB	3	(England) Rico Henry		(substituted off) 105'
CM	8	(Denmark) Mathias Jensen	(yellow card) 88'	(substituted off) 105+1'
CM	6	(Denmark) Christian Nørgaard	(yellow card) 103'
CM	14	(England) Josh Dasilva		(substituted off) 83'
RW	19	(France) Bryan Mbeumo		(substituted off) 61'
CF	11	(England) Ollie Watkins
LW	10	(Algeria) Saïd Benrahma
Substitutes:
GK	28	(England) Luke Daniels
DF	23	(Guinea) Julian Jeanvier
DF	35	(Denmark) Mads Roerslev
MF	7	(Spain) Sergi Canós		(substituted on) 83'
MF	16	(Ecuador) Joel Valencia
MF	17	(Denmark) Emiliano Marcondes		(substituted on) 61'
MF	24	(Ghana) Tariqe Fosu		(substituted on) 105'
MF	31	(Czech Republic) Jan Žambůrek
FW	21	(Turkey) Halil Dervişoğlu		(substituted on) 105+1'
Head coach:
(Denmark) Thomas Frank

GK	12	(Slovakia) Marek Rodák	(yellow card) 120+4'
RB	4	(Belgium) Denis Odoi		(substituted off) 110'
CB	3	(Jamaica) Michael Hector	(yellow card) 98'
CB	13	(United States) Tim Ream
LB	23	(England) Joe Bryan
CM	21	(England) Harrison Reed	(yellow card) 29'
CM	10	(Scotland) Tom Cairney (c)	(yellow card) 67'
RM	7	(Democratic Republic of the Congo) Neeskens Kebano		(substituted off) 81'
AM	25	(England) Josh Onomah		(substituted off) 110'
LM	14	(Jamaica) Bobby De Cordova-Reid		(substituted off) 90+2'
CF	47	(France) Aboubakar Kamara		(substituted off) 105+1'
Substitutes:
GK	1	(England) Marcus Bettinelli
DF	20	(France) Maxime Le Marchand		(substituted on) 110'
DF	22	(Republic of Ireland) Cyrus Christie		(substituted on) 110'
DF	43	(England) Steven Sessegnon
MF	6	(Scotland) Kevin McDonald
MF	8	(Norway) Stefan Johansen
FW	9	(Serbia) Aleksandar Mitrović	(yellow card) 104'	(substituted on) 90+2'
FW	19	(Portugal) Ivan Cavaleiro	(yellow card) 120+2'	(substituted on) 105+1'
FW	24	(France) Anthony Knockaert	(yellow card) 102'	(substituted on) 81'
Manager:
(England) Scott Parker

Man of the Match:
Joe Bryan (Fulham)

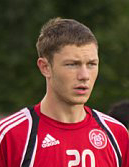
Henrik Dalsgaard (pictured in 2011) scored Brentford's consolation goal.

Statistics
	Brentford	Fulham
Possession	49%	51%
Goals scored	1	2
Shots on target	4	6
Shots off target	12	8
Fouls committed	11	14
Corner kicks	4	4
Yellow cards	2	7
Red cards	0	0

== Post-match ==
Fulham's goalscorer and man of the match Bryan noted: "I think I read somewhere we were supposed to be scared of them. We took it to them, we scored twice, they made it hard for us but they're a good team and they've been playing really well." His captain, Cairney, suggested: "It shows the spirit in the dressing room, not many teams bounce back up ... Brentford are a great side, a pleasure to watch and these were the two best sides in the Championship play-off final." The Fulham manager Scott Parker reflected upon his time at the club having been appointed midway through their previous season which had ended in relegation from the Premier League: "We've done what we've done tonight, but there's still improvement, and that's what makes me so proud and happy. For all of the good players and everything you see, what makes me so happy I see a group of players who only a year ago were struggling psychologically, didn't have a mindset or mentality." Brentford's head coach Thomas Frank was generous in defeat: "First I would like to say congratulations to Fulham, Scott Parker, his coaching staff and everyone involved." He also commented on Brentford's improved form, having ended the previous season in 11th place in the league: "We have gone from a mid-table club to a team who, in the league table, was the third-best team."

Losing the final meant that Brentford set a record for the most unsuccessful play-off campaigns in English Football League play-off history with nine. Brentford's Watkins was named Championship Player of the Year.
