= 2020–21 Brentford F.C. season =

English football team season

Brentford
2020–21 season
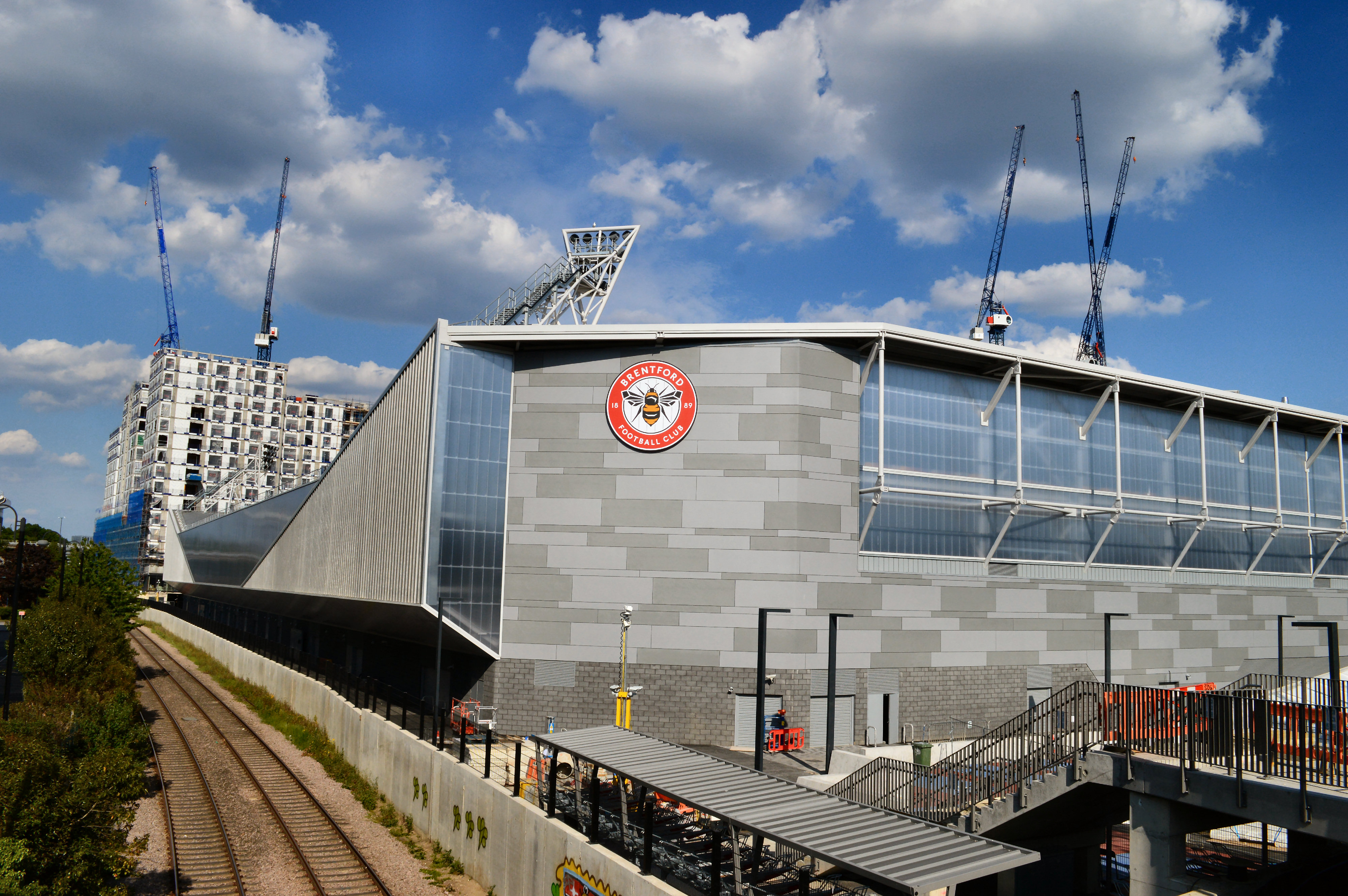
- Owner: Matthew Benham
- Chairman: Cliff Crown
- Head coach: Thomas Frank
- Stadium: Brentford Community Stadium
- Championship: 3rd (Promoted via play-offs)
- FA Cup: Fourth round
- EFL Cup: Semi-finals
- Top goalscorer: League: Ivan Toney (31); All: Ivan Toney (33)
- Highest home attendance: 4,000
- Lowest home attendance: 2,000
- Average home league attendance: 2,000
Home colours	Away colours	Third colours

The 2020–21 Brentford F.C. season was the club's 131st season in existence and seventh consecutive season in the Championship, the second tier of English football. Brentford would also compete in the FA Cup and competed in the EFL Cup. The season covered the period from 1 September 2020 to 30 June 2021. Brentford secured promotion to the Premier League on 29 May 2021, following a 2–0 victory against Swansea City in the play-off final at Wembley, confirming the club's top flight status for the first time in 74 years.

This season marked the club's move to the Brentford Community Stadium from Griffin Park, its home for 116 years.

== First team squad ==
Players' ages are as of the opening day of the 2020–21 season.

#	Name	Nationality	Position	Date of birth (age)	Signed from	Signed in	Notes
Goalkeepers
1	David Raya	(Spain)	GK	15 September 1995 (aged 24)	Blackburn Rovers	2019	
13	Patrik Gunnarsson	(Iceland)	GK	15 November 2000 (aged 19)	Breiðablik	2018	Loaned to Viborg FF and Silkeborg IF
25	Ellery Balcombe	(England)	GK	15 October 1999 (aged 20)	Academy	2016	Loaned to Doncaster Rovers
28	Luke Daniels	(England)	GK	5 January 1988 (aged 32)	Scunthorpe United	2017	
40	Nathan Shepperd	(Wales)	GK	9 October 2000 (aged 19)	Swansea City	2019	
Defenders
2	Dominic Thompson	(England)	LB	26 July 2000 (aged 20)	Arsenal	2019	Loaned to Swindon Town
3	Rico Henry	(Jamaica)	LB	8 July 1997 (aged 23)	Walsall	2016	
4	Charlie Goode	(England)	CB	3 August 1995 (aged 25)	Northampton Town	2020	
5	Ethan Pinnock	(Jamaica)	CB	29 May 1993 (aged 27)	Barnsley	2019	
18	Pontus Jansson (c)	(Sweden)	CB	13 February 1991 (aged 29)	Leeds United	2019	
22	Henrik Dalsgaard	(Denmark)	RB	27 July 1989 (aged 31)	Zulte Waregem	2017	
~~23~~	Julian Jeanvier	(Guinea)	CB	31 March 1992 (aged 28)	Reims	2018	Loaned to Kasımpaşa
23	Winston Reid	(New Zealand)	CB	3 July 1988 (aged 32)	West Ham United	2021	On loan from West Ham United
29	Mads Bech Sørensen	(Denmark)	CB	7 January 1999 (aged 21)	AC Horsens	2017	
30	Mads Roerslev	(Denmark)	RB	24 June 1999 (aged 21)	F.C. Copenhagen	2019	
~~32~~	Luka Racic	(Denmark)	CB	8 May 1999 (aged 21)	F.C. Copenhagen	2018	Loaned to Northampton Town
35	Kane O'Connor	(Scotland)	CB	17 January 2001 (aged 19)	Hibernian	2019	
36	Fin Stevens	(Wales)	RB	10 April 2003 (aged 17)	Worthing	2020	
39	Lewis Gordon	(Scotland)	LB	12 February 2001 (aged 19)	Watford	2020	
Midfielders
6	Christian Nørgaard	(Denmark)	DM	10 March 1994 (aged 26)	Fiorentina	2019	
8	Mathias Jensen	(Denmark)	CM	1 January 1996 (aged 24)	Celta	2019	
9	Emiliano Marcondes	(Denmark)	AM	9 March 1995 (aged 25)	Nordsjælland	2018	
14	Josh Dasilva	(England)	AM	23 October 1998 (aged 21)	Arsenal	2018	
20	Saman Ghoddos	(Iran)	AM	6 September 1993 (aged 27)	Amiens	2021	Loaned from Amiens before transferring permanently
26	Shandon Baptiste	(Grenada)	CM	8 April 1998 (aged 22)	Oxford United	2020	
27	Vitaly Janelt	(Germany)	DM	10 May 1998 (aged 22)	VfL Bochum	2020	
31	Jan Žambůrek	(Czech Republic)	CM	13 February 2001 (aged 19)	Slavia Prague	2018	Loaned to Shrewsbury Town
32	Paris Maghoma	(England)	CM	8 May 2001 (aged 19)	Tottenham Hotspur	2020	
37	Alex Gilbert	(Republic of Ireland)	AM	28 December 2001 (aged 18)	West Bromwich Albion	2020	
41	Mads Bidstrup	(Denmark)	DM	25 February 2001 (aged 19)	RB Leipzig	2020	
Attackers
7	Sergi Canós	(Spain)	W	2 February 1997 (aged 23)	Norwich City	2017	
15	Marcus Forss	(Finland)	FW	18 June 1999 (aged 21)	West Bromwich Albion	2017	
16	Joel Valencia	(Ecuador)	W	16 November 1994 (aged 25)	Piast Gliwice	2019	Loaned to Legia Warsaw
17	Ivan Toney	(England)	FW	16 March 1996 (aged 24)	Peterborough United	2020	
19	Bryan Mbeumo	(France)	W	7 August 1999 (aged 21)	Troyes	2019	
21	Halil Dervişoğlu	(Turkey)	FW	8 December 1999 (aged 20)	Sparta Rotterdam	2020	Loaned to FC Twente and Galatasaray S.K.
24	Tariqe Fosu	(Ghana)	LW	5 November 1995 (aged 24)	Oxford United	2020	
34	Aaron Pressley	(Scotland)	FW	7 November 2001 (aged 18)	Aston Villa	2020	
38	Max Haygarth	(England)	W	21 January 2002 (aged 18)	Manchester United	2021	Loaned from Manchester United before transferring permanently
Players who left the club mid-season
10	Saïd Benrahma	(Algeria)	W	10 August 1995 (aged 25)	OGC Nice	2018	Loaned to West Ham United, transferred to West Ham United
11	Ollie Watkins	(England)	FW	30 December 1995 (aged 24)	Exeter City	2017	Transferred to Aston Villa
33	Fredrik Hammar	(Sweden)	CM	26 February 2001 (aged 19)	Akropolis IF	2019	Transferred to Akropolis IF

== Coaching staff ==
Name	Role
(Denmark) Thomas Frank	Head Coach
(Denmark) Brian Riemer	Assistant Head Coach
(Republic of Ireland) Kevin O'Connor	Assistant First Team Coach
(Spain) Manu Sotelo	Goalkeeper Coach
(England) Neil Greig	Head of Medical
(England) Chris Haslam	Head of Athletic Performance
(England) Luke Stopforth	Head of Performance Analysis
(Mexico) Bernardo Cueva	Tactical Statistician

Source: brentfordfc.com

== Transfers ==
=== Transfers in ===
Date	Position	Nationality	Name	From	Fee	Ref.
16 July 2020	CM	(Denmark)	Mads Bidstrup	(Germany) Red Bull Leipzig	Undisclosed	
23 July 2020	CB	(England)	Ben Hockenhull	(England) Manchester United	Undisclosed	
27 July 2020	RW	(England)	Wraynel Hercules	(England) Barnet	Free transfer	
28 July 2020	CM	(Wales)	Fin Stevens	(England) Worthing	Undisclosed	
18 August 2020	CB	(England)	Charlie Goode	(England) Northampton Town	Undisclosed	
25 August 2020	CB	(France)	Tristan Crama	(France) AS Béziers	Undisclosed	
1 September 2020	FW	(England)	Ivan Toney	(England) Peterborough United	£5,000,000	
4 September 2020	LB	(Scotland)	Lewis Gordon	(England) Watford	Free transfer	
20 September 2020	GK	(Northern Ireland)	Jared Thompson	Free agent	Free transfer	
25 September 2020	AM	(Republic of Ireland)	Alex Gilbert	(England) West Bromwich Albion	Free transfer	
3 October 2020	DM	(Germany)	Vitaly Janelt	(Germany) VfL Bochum	Undisclosed	
5 October 2020	FW	(Australia)	Lachlan Brook	(Australia) Adelaide United	Undisclosed	
4 January 2021	MF	(England)	Max Haygarth	(England) Manchester United	Undisclosed	
11 January 2021	MF	(England)	Ryan Trevitt	(England) Leatherhead Youth	Undisclosed	
14 January 2021	AM	(Iran)	Saman Ghoddos	(France) Amiens	Undisclosed	
29 January 2021	GK	(England)	Ben Winterbottom	(England) Liverpool	Undisclosed	

=== Loans in ===
Date	Position	Nationality	Name	From	Date until	Ref.
21 September 2020	AM	(Iran)	Saman Ghoddos	(France) Amiens	14 January 2021	
5 October 2020	RM	(Iceland)	Valgeir Valgeirsson	(Iceland) HK	23 April 2021	
16 October 2020	W	(England)	Max Haygarth	(England) Manchester United	4 January 2021	
1 February 2021	CB	(New Zealand)	Winston Reid	(England) West Ham United	End of season	
2 February 2021	DM	(England)	Ethan Robb	(England) Bognor Regis Town	End of season	

=== Loans out ===
Date	Position	Nationality	Name	To	Date until	Ref.
13 August 2020	CM	(Finland)	Jaakko Oksanen	(England) AFC Wimbledon	End of season	
21 August 2020	CB	(Denmark)	Luka Racic	(England) Northampton Town	3 January 2021 (Note: Racic was recalled from his season-long loan at Northampton Town on 3 January 2021.)	
3 September 2020	CB	(Guinea)	Julian Jeanvier	(Turkey) Kasımpaşa	End of season	
7 September 2020	GK	(Iceland)	Patrik Gunnarsson	(Denmark) Viborg FF	31 December 2020	
10 September 2020	MF	(England)	Arthur Read	(England) Stevenage	End of season	
16 September 2020	W	(Ecuador)	Joel Valencia	(Poland) Legia Warsaw	End of season	
5 October 2020	CM	(Czech Republic)	Jan Žambůrek	(England) Shrewsbury Town	11 January 2021 (Note: Žambůrek was recalled from his season-long loan at Shrewsbury Town on 11 January 2021.)	
6 October 2020	FW	(Turkey)	Halil Dervişoğlu	(Netherlands) FC Twente	2 January 2021 (Note: Dervişoğlu was recalled from his season-long loan at FC Twente on 2 January 2021.)	
16 October 2020	LW	(Algeria)	Saïd Benrahma	(England) West Ham United	29 January 2021 (Note: Under the terms of Benrahma's loan, Brentford received a £4,000,000 fee. Benrahma's season-long loan at West Ham United was made into a permanent transfer on 29 January 2021.)	
4 January 2021	LB	(England)	Dominic Thompson	(England) Swindon Town	End of season	
5 January 2021	GK	(Iceland)	Patrik Gunnarsson	(Denmark) Silkeborg IF	End of season	
6 January 2021	GK	(England)	Ellery Balcombe	(England) Doncaster Rovers	End of season	
25 January 2021	FW	(Turkey)	Halil Dervişoğlu	(Turkey) Galatasaray S.K.	End of season	
1 February 2021	LW	(Wales)	Joe Adams	(England) Grimsby Town	9 April 2021 (Note: Adams was recalled from his half-season loan at Grimsby Town on 9 April 2021.)	

=== Transfers out ===
Date	Position	Nationality	Name	To	Fee	Ref.
30 June 2020	LW	(England)	Jaden Brissett	(England) Dagenham & Redbridge	Released	
30 June 2020	CM	(England)	Reece Cole	(England) Queens Park Rangers	Released	
30 June 2020	LB	(Wales)	Cole Dasilva	Free agent	Released	
30 June 2020	LW	(Czech Republic)	Matěj Majka	(Czech Republic) FC MAS Táborsko	Released	
30 June 2020	CB	(Scotland)	Jonny Mitchell	(Scotland) Stirling Albion	Released	
30 June 2020	AM	(England)	Jayden Onen	(England) Reading	Released	
30 June 2020	FW	(Denmark)	Justin Shaibu	(Denmark) FC Fredericia	Released	
30 June 2020	LB	(Cyprus)	Nick Tsaroulla	(England) Crawley Town	Released	
29 July 2020	RB	(Latvia)	David Titov	(Republic of Ireland) St Patrick's Athletic	Released	
5 August 2020	CM	(England)	Dru Yearwood	(United States) New York Red Bulls	Undisclosed	
6 August 2020	FW	(Greece)	Nikos Karelis	(Netherlands) ADO Den Haag	Released	
6 August 2020	DM	(South Africa)	Kamohelo Mokotjo	(United States) FC Cincinnati	Released	
9 September 2020	FW	(England)	Ollie Watkins	(England) Aston Villa	£28,000,000	
25 January 2021	CM	(Sweden)	Fredrik Hammar	(Sweden) Akropolis IF	Undisclosed	
29 January 2021	LW	(Algeria)	Saïd Benrahma	(England) West Ham United	£21,750,000	
23 March 2021	GK	(Sweden)	Simon Andersson	(Sweden) IF Elfsborg	Free transfer	

== Pre-season ==
26 August 2020	Brentford	3–0	Derby County	Burton upon Trent
11:30 BST	Forss 35'; Nørgaard 75'; Jensen 88'	Report		Stadium: St George's Park National Football Centre

29 August 2020	West Ham United	2–1	Brentford	Stratford
14:00 BST	Yarmolenko 5'; Souček 61'	Report	Forss 32'	Stadium: London Stadium; Referee: Stuart Attwell

1 September 2020	Brentford	2–2	Oxford United	Brentford
15:00 BST	Canos 55', 73'	Report	Osei 84', 86'	Stadium: Brentford Community Stadium

Win Draw Loss Fixtures

== Competitions ==
=== Overview ===
Competition	First match	Last match	Starting round	Final position	Record							
Competition	First match	Last match	Starting round	Final position	Pld	W	D	L	GF	GA	GD	Win %
Championship	12 September 2020	8 May 2021	Matchday 1	3rd	46	24	15	7	79	42	+37	52.17
FA Cup	9 January 2021	24 January 2021	Third round	Fourth round	2	1	0	1	3	4	−1	50.00
EFL Cup	6 September 2020	5 January 2021	First round	Semi-finals	6	3	2	1	9	5	+4	50.00
Total					54	28	17	9	91	51	+40	51.85

Source: Soccerway

=== Championship ===
==== League table ====
Pos	Team	Pld	W	D	L	GF	GA	GD	Pts	Promotion, qualification or relegation
1	Norwich City (C, P)	46	29	10	7	75	36	+39	97	Promotion to the Premier League
2	Watford (P)	46	27	10	9	63	30	+33	91	Promotion to the Premier League
3	Brentford (O, P)	46	24	15	7	79	42	+37	87	Qualification for Championship play-offs
4	Swansea City	46	23	11	12	56	39	+17	80	Qualification for Championship play-offs
5	Barnsley	46	23	9	14	58	50	+8	78	Qualification for Championship play-offs
6	Bournemouth	46	22	11	13	73	46	+27	77	Qualification for Championship play-offs

Source: EFL Official Website
Rules for classification: 1) Points; 2) Goal difference; 3) Number of goals scored; 4) Head-to-head results; 5) Wins; 6) Away goals; 7) Penalty points (sec 9.5); 8) 12-point sending off offences
(C) Champions; (O) Play-off winners; (P) Promoted

==== Results summary ====
Overall								Home						Away					
Pld	W	D	L	GF	GA	GD	Pts	W	D	L	GF	GA	GD	W	D	L	GF	GA	GD
46	24	15	7	79	42	+37	87	12	9	2	39	20	+19	12	6	5	40	22	+18

Last updated: 8 May 2021.
Source: Football Web Pages

==== Results by matchday ====
Matchday	1	2	3	4	5	6	7	8	9	10	11	12	13	14	15	16	17	18	19	20	21	22	23	24	25	26	27	28	29	30	31	32	33	34	35	36	37	38	39	40	41	42	43	44	45	46
Ground	A	H	A	H	H	A	A	H	A	H	H	A	A	H	A	H	H	A	A	H	A	H	H	A	H	H	A	A	H	A	A	H	H	A	A	A	H	A	H	A	H	H	A	H	H	A
Result	L	W	D	L	W	W	L	D	W	D	D	D	W	W	W	D	D	W	D	W	W	W	W	D	W	W	W	W	L	L	L	W	W	L	W	D	D	D	D	W	D	D	W	W	W	W
Position	16	11	10	15	10	7	11	11	9	10	11	11	9	7	6	6	7	6	6	4	4	4	3	4	3	2	2	1	2	2	2	2	2	2	4	4	4	3	3	3	4	4	3	3	3	3

Updated to match(es) played on 8 May 2021. Source:
A = Away; H = Home; W = Win; D = Draw; L = Loss

==== Matches ====
12 September 2020 1	Birmingham City	1–0	Brentford	Bordesley
12:30 BST	Bela 37'; Šunjić (yellow card) 59'; Pedersen (yellow card) 72'; Clayton (yellow card) 80'	Report	Nørgaard (yellow card) 49'	Stadium: St Andrew's; Attendance: 0 Referee: Tony Harrington

19 September 2020 2	Brentford	3–0	Huddersfield Town	Brentford
15:00 BST	Nørgaard (yellow card) 40'; Dasilva 58'; Forss 86'; Mbeumo 90+1'	Report		Stadium: Brentford Community Stadium; Referee: Craig Pawson

26 September 2020 3	Millwall	1–1	Brentford	London
15:00 BST	Wallace 4'; Romeo (yellow card) 18'; Hutchinson (yellow card) 20'; Leonard (yellow card) 64'	Report	Thompson (yellow card) 13'; Toney 21' (pen.)	Stadium: The Den; Referee: David Coote

4 October 2020 4	Brentford	2–4	Preston North End	Brentford
14:00 BST	Toney 8', 43'	Report	Sinclair 52', 60'; Potts 63'; Maguire 70'	Stadium: Brentford Community Stadium; Attendance: 0 Referee: Dean Whitestone

17 October 2020 5	Brentford	2–0	Coventry City	Brentford
15:00 BST	Jensen (yellow card) 43'; Toney 46', 55'	Report	Sheaf (yellow card) 81'	Stadium: Brentford Community Stadium; Attendance: 0 Referee: Andy Woolmer

21 October 2020 6	Sheffield Wednesday	1–2	Brentford	Owlerton, Sheffield
19:45 BST	Paterson 25'; Odubajo (yellow card) 73'	Report	Toney 7', 30'	Stadium: Hillsborough; Attendance: 0 Referee: Darren Bond

24 October 2020 7	Stoke City	3–2	Brentford	Stoke-on-Trent
15:00 BST	Fletcher 9', (yellow card) 81'; McClean 35'; Campbell 59'; Oakley-Boothe (yellow card) 88'	Report	Toney (yellow card) 40'; Forss 70', 90+1'	Stadium: Bet365 Stadium; Attendance: 0 Referee: Keith Stroud

27 October 2020 8	Brentford	1–1	Norwich City	Brentford
19:45 GMT	Toney 27'; Janelt (yellow card) 80'	Report	Gibson (yellow card) 78'; McLean 87'	Stadium: Brentford Community Stadium; Attendance: 0 Referee: Jeremy Simpson

31 October 2020 9	Luton Town	0–3	Brentford	Luton
15:00 GMT	Hylton (yellow card) 54'	Report	Henry 20'; Toney 29'; Forss 76'; Janelt (yellow card) 90'	Stadium: Kenilworth Road; Attendance: 0 Referee: Michael Salisbury

3 November 2020 10	Brentford	1–1	Swansea City	Brentford
19:00 GMT	Toney 36'; Marcondes (yellow card) 57'; Dalsgaard (yellow card) 76'; Forss (yellow card) 88'	Report	Ayew 77'	Stadium: Brentford Community Stadium; Attendance: 0 Referee: Stephen Martin

7 November 2020 11	Brentford	0–0	Middlesbrough	Brentford
15:00 GMT	Dalsgaard (yellow card) 19'	Report		Stadium: Brentford Community Stadium; Attendance: 0 Referee: James Linington

21 November 2020 12	Wycombe Wanderers	0–0	Brentford	High Wycombe
15:00 GMT	Kashket (yellow card) 45+1'; Samuel (yellow card) 63'; Stewart (yellow card) 64'; Horgan (yellow card) 89'	Report	Canós (yellow card) 70'; Toney (yellow card) 90+4'	Stadium: Adams Park; Attendance: 0 Referee: Lee Mason

24 November 2020 13	Barnsley	0–1	Brentford	Barnsley
19:45 GMT	Chaplin (yellow card) 40'	Report	Toney 66'	Stadium: Oakwell; Attendance: 0 Referee: Darren Bond

27 November 2020 14	Brentford	2–1	Queens Park Rangers	Brentford
19:45 GMT	Janelt 14'; Sørensen (yellow card) 39'; Toney 64'; Canós (yellow card) 90+5'	Report	Dykes 26'; Hämäläinen (yellow card) 29'; Kane (yellow card) 66' (yellow-red card) 84'; Ball (yellow card) 74'	Stadium: Brentford Community Stadium; Attendance: 0 Referee: Matt Donohue

1 December 2020 15	Rotherham United	0–2	Brentford	Rotherham
20:00 GMT	Crooks (yellow card) 22'; Wood (yellow card) 48'; Miller (yellow card) 72' (yellow-red card) 82'; MacDonald (yellow card) 73'	Report	Forss 57'; Toney 82' (pen.)	Stadium: New York Stadium; Attendance: 0 Referee: Tim Robinson

5 December 2020 16	Brentford	2–2	Blackburn Rovers	Brentford
15:00 GMT	Forss (yellow card) 5'; Janelt (yellow card) 31'; Toney 37' (pen.); Canós 61'; Fosu (yellow card) 82'	Report	Douglas (yellow card) 10'; Rothwell 19', (yellow card) 49'; Lenihan (yellow card) 27', (red card) 36'; Johnson (yellow card) 57'; Davenport 87'; Kaminski (yellow card) 90+4'	Stadium: Brentford Community Stadium; Attendance: 2,000; Referee: Oliver Langford

9 December 2020 17	Brentford	0–0	Derby County	Brentford
19:45 GMT	Dalsgaard (yellow card) 55'; Dasilva (yellow card) 90+1'	Report	Shinnie (yellow card) 41'	Stadium: Brentford Community Stadium; Attendance: 2,000; Referee: David Webb

12 December 2020 18	Nottingham Forest	1–3	Brentford	West Bridgford
15:00 GMT	Figueiredo (yellow card) 61'; Samba (yellow card) 64'; Knockaert (yellow card) 79' (yellow-red card) 90+5'; Worrall 90+2'	Report	Dalsgaard 15'; Toney (yellow card) 64', (goal) 88'; Raya (yellow card) 81'; Dasilva 83'; Janelt (yellow card) 90+2'	Stadium: The City Ground; Attendance: 0 Referee: Geoff Eltringham

15 December 2020 19	Watford	1–1	Brentford	Watford
20:00 GMT	Deeney 60' (pen.), (yellow card) 87'; Kabasele (yellow card) 76'; Troost-Ekong (yellow card) 90+1'; Sarr (yellow card) 90+3'	Report	Pinnock (red card) 58'; Toney 63' (pen.)	Stadium: Vicarage Road; Attendance: 0 Referee: James Linington

19 December 2020 20	Brentford	3–1	Reading	Brentford
15:00 GMT	Jensen 11', (yellow card) 45+1'; Mbeumo 23', 29'; Janelt (yellow card) 90+4'	Report	Baldock (yellow card) 53'; Aluko 64'	Stadium: Brentford Community Stadium; Attendance: 0 Referee: Keith Stroud

26 December 2020 21	Cardiff City	2–3	Brentford	Cardiff
15:00 GMT	Vaulks 45+4', 76', (yellow card) 55'	Report	Canós 50', 65', 73'	Stadium: Cardiff City Stadium; Attendance: 0 Referee: Dean Whitestone

30 December 2020 22	Brentford	2–1	Bournemouth	Brentford
17:30 GMT	Dalsgaard 37'; Fosu 79'	Report	Solanke 25'; Cook (yellow card) 41'	Stadium: Brentford Community Stadium; Attendance: 0 Referee: Jarred Gillett

20 January 2021 23	Brentford	1–0	Luton Town	Brentford
19:00 GMT	Ghoddos 14'; Mbeumo (yellow card) 32'; Toney (yellow card) 81' (yellow-red card) 90+5'	Report	Bradley (yellow card) 39'; Lockyer (red card) 90+5'	Stadium: Brentford Community Stadium; Attendance: 0 Referee: Steve Martin

27 January 2021 24	Swansea City	1–1	Brentford	Swansea
19:00 GMT	Hourihane (yellow card) 39', (goal) 78'; Naughton (yellow card) 44' (yellow-red card) 69'; Fulton (yellow card) 51'; Roberts (yellow card) 90+4'	Report	Fosu 74'	Stadium: The Liberty Stadium; Attendance: 0 Referee: John Brooks

30 January 2021 25	Brentford	7–2	Wycombe Wanderers	Brentford
15:00 GMT	Pinnock 9'; Toney 41', 56' (pen.), 86'; Fosu 50'; Canós 81'; Dasilva 89'	Report	Ikpeazu 14'; Muskwe 43'; Wheeler (yellow card) 45+3'	Stadium: Brentford Community Stadium; Attendance: 0 Referee: Michael Salisbury

3 February 2021 26	Brentford	3–2	Bristol City	Brentford
19:45 GMT	Canós 27'; Toney 50'; Ghoddos 53'	Report	Vyner 3'; Wells 90'	Stadium: Brentford Community Stadium; Attendance: 0 Referee: Tim Robinson

6 February 2021 27	Middlesbrough	1–4	Brentford	Middlesbrough
15:00 GMT	Raya 3' (o.g.); Saville (yellow card) 29'	Report	Fosu (yellow card) 21'; Toney 38', 80'; Janelt (yellow card) 50', (goal) 58'; Jensen 64'	Stadium: Riverside Stadium; Attendance: 0 Referee: Darren Bond

10 February 2021 28	Reading	1–3	Brentford	Reading
19:00 GMT	João 24' (pen.); Richards (yellow card) 74'	Report	Dasilva 36', 86'; Toney 88'	Stadium: Madejski Stadium; Attendance: 0 Referee: Tony Harrington

14 February 2021 29	Brentford	0–2	Barnsley	Brentford
13:00 GMT	Toney (yellow card) 90+6'	Report	Chaplin 13'; Sollbauer (yellow card) 26'; Dike (yellow card) 43'; Morris 47'; Woodrow (yellow card) 83'; Mowatt (yellow card) 90+1' Valérien Ismaël (yellow card)	Stadium: Brentford Community Stadium; Attendance: 0 Referee: David Coote

17 February 2021 30	Queens Park Rangers	2–1	Brentford	Shepherd's Bush
19:00 GMT	Kane (yellow card) 29'; Ball (yellow card) 33'; Dickie (yellow card) 57'; Field 72'; Austin 76'; Cameron (yellow card) 84'; Dieng (yellow card) 89'	Report	Toney 30', (yellow card) 90'	Stadium: Loftus Road; Attendance: 0 Referee: Gavin Ward

20 February 2021 31	Coventry City	2–0	Brentford	Bordesley
12:30 GMT	Walker 19' (pen.), 55'; Hyam (yellow card) 44'; O'Hare (yellow card) 77'	Report		Stadium: St Andrew's; Attendance: 0 Referee: Steve Martin

24 February 2021 32	Brentford	3–0	Sheffield Wednesday	Brentford
19:00 GMT	Mbeumo 23'; Ghoddos (yellow card) 30', (goal) 74'; Canós (yellow card) 39'; Dalsgaard (yellow card) 72'; Sørensen 83'	Report	Penney (yellow card) 82'	Stadium: Brentford Community Stadium; Attendance: 0 Referee: Jeremy Simpson

27 February 2021 33	Brentford	2–1	Stoke City	Brentford
15:00 GMT	Dasilva (yellow card) 18'; Janelt 56'; Toney 79'	Report	Brown 1'; Thompson (yellow card) 25'; Norrington-Davies (yellow card) 35'; Allen (yellow card) 68'	Stadium: Brentford Community Stadium; Attendance: 0 Referee: John Brooks

3 March 2021 34	Norwich City	1–0	Brentford	Norwich
17:30 GMT	Buendía 26'; Vrančić (yellow card) 51'; Hernández (yellow card) 71'	Report	Reid (yellow card) 41'	Stadium: Carrow Road; Attendance: 0 Referee: Tim Robinson

12 March 2021 35	Blackburn Rovers	0–1	Brentford	Blackburn
19:45 GMT	Buckley (yellow card) 75'; Lenihan (yellow card) 86'; Bennett (yellow card) 90+6'; Johnson (yellow card) 90+9'	Report	Toney 10' (pen.); Mbeumo (yellow card) 80'; Sørensen (yellow card) 90'	Stadium: Ewood Park; Attendance: 0 Referee: Geoff Eltringham

16 March 2021 36	Derby County	2–2	Brentford	Derby
19:00 GMT	Gregory 47'; Sibley 87'	Report	Toney 8' (pen.); Canós 23'	Stadium: Pride Park Stadium; Attendance: 0 Referee: David Webb

20 March 2021 37	Brentford	1–1	Nottingham Forest	Brentford
12:30 GMT	Toney 12' (pen.); Janelt (yellow card) 26'; Dalsgaard (yellow card) 35'; Marcondes (yellow card) 90'	Report	Mighten (yellow card) 25'; Krovinović 63'; Cafú (yellow card) 67'; Ameobi (yellow card) 78'; Figueiredo (yellow card) 90'	Stadium: Brentford Community Stadium; Attendance: 0 Referee: Graham Scott

3 April 2021 38	Huddersfield Town	1–1	Brentford	Huddersfield
12:30 BST	O'Brien 7', (yellow card) 90+3'; Holmes (yellow card) 56'; Hogg (yellow card) 88'; Schofield (yellow card) 90+1'	Report	Bech Sørensen 50'; Mbeumo (yellow card) 66'	Stadium: Kirklees Stadium; Attendance: 0 Referee: Oliver Langford

6 April 2021 39	Brentford	0–0	Birmingham City	Brentford
19:00 BST		Report		Stadium: Brentford Community Stadium; Attendance: 0 Referee: Dean Whitestone

10 April 2021 40	Preston North End	0–5	Brentford	Preston
15:00 BST	Ledson (yellow card) 45+3'	Report	Mbeumo 9'; Forss 26'; Toney 75'; Canós 82'; Marcondes 90+1'	Stadium: Deepdale; Attendance: 0 Referee: Tony Harrington

17 April 2021 41	Brentford	0–0	Millwall	Brentford
12:30 BST	Fosu (yellow card) 48'	Report	Evans (yellow card) 36'	Stadium: Brentford Community Stadium; Attendance: 0 Referee: Darren Bond

20 April 2021 42	Brentford	1–1	Cardiff City	Brentford
18:00 BST	Fosu 63', (yellow card) 87'; Canós (yellow card) 90'	Report	Moore 57' (pen.)	Stadium: Brentford Community Stadium; Attendance: 0 Referee: Darren England

24 April 2021 43	Bournemouth	0–1	Brentford	King's Park
12:30 BST	Lerma (yellow card) 68'	Report	Jansson (yellow card) 25' (yellow-red card) 50'; Forss (yellow card) 68'; Mbeumo 77'; Toney (yellow card) 80'; Janelt (yellow card) 87'	Stadium: Dean Court; Attendance: 0 Referee: John Brooks

27 April 2021 44	Brentford	1–0	Rotherham United	Brentford
19:00 BST	Mbeumo 26'			Stadium: Brentford Community Stadium; Attendance: 0 Referee: Michael Salisbury

1 May 2021 45	Brentford	2–0	Watford	Brentford
15:00 BST	Forss 46'; Toney 60'; Bidstrup (yellow card) 66'; Canós (yellow card) 69'	Report	Perica (yellow card) 88'	Stadium: Brentford Community Stadium; Attendance: 0 Referee: Lee Mason

8 May 2021 46	Bristol City	1–3	Brentford	Ashton Gate
12:30 BST	Palmer (yellow card) 27'; Simpson (yellow card) 54'; Baker (yellow card) 60'; Britton (yellow card) 77', (goal) 87'	Report	Toney (yellow card) 30', (goal) 57'; Mbeumo 78'; Canós 83'	Stadium: Ashton Gate; Attendance: 0 Referee: James Linington

=== Play-offs ===
17 May 2021 Semi-final first leg	Bournemouth	1–0	Brentford	King's Park
18:00 BST	Danjuma 55'	Report	Roerslev (yellow card) 45+4'; Jansson (yellow card) 47'	Stadium: Dean Court; Attendance: 2,000; Referee: Tim Robinson

22 May 2021 Semi-final second leg	Brentford	3–1 (3–2 agg.)	Bournemouth	Brentford
12:30 BST	Toney 16' (pen.), (yellow card) 17'; Janelt 50'; Jansson (yellow card) 78'; Forss 81'; Dalsgaard (yellow card) 90+1'	Report	Danjuma 5'; Begović (yellow card) 17'; Mepham (red card) 28'; Lerma (yellow card) 45+6'; Stacey (yellow card) 90+4'	Stadium: Brentford Community Stadium; Attendance: 3,830; Referee: Jarred Gillett

29 May 2021 Final	Brentford	2–0	Swansea City	Wembley
15:00 BST	Toney 10' (pen.); Marcondes 20', (yellow card) 22'; Janelt (yellow card) 70'	Report	Grimes (yellow card) 6'; Fulton (red card) 65'	Stadium: Wembley Stadium; Attendance: 11,689; Referee: Chris Kavanagh

=== FA Cup ===
9 January 2021 Third round	Brentford	2–1	Middlesbrough	Brentford
18:00 GMT	Ghoddos (yellow card) 6', (goal) 64'; Dervişoğlu 35'	Report	Folarin 48'; Tavernier (yellow card) 78'; Hackney (yellow card) 88'	Stadium: Brentford Community Stadium; Attendance: 0 Referee: Tim Robinson

24 January 2021 Fourth round	Brentford	1–3	Leicester City	Brentford
14:30 GMT	Sørensen 6'; Žambůrek (yellow card) 21'	Report	Ünder 46'; Tielemans 51' (pen.); Maddison 71'	Stadium: Brentford Community Stadium; Attendance: 0 Referee: Michael Oliver

=== EFL Cup ===
6 September 2020 First round	Brentford	1–1 (4–2 p)	Wycombe Wanderers	Brentford
12:00 BST	Pinnock 32'	Report	Gape (red card) 48'; Horgan 76'	Stadium: Brentford Community Stadium; Attendance: 0 Referee: Charles Breakspear
	Penalties
	Toney (penalty scored); Žambůrek (penalty scored); Jensen (penalty missed); Canós (penalty scored); Forss (penalty scored)		(penalty scored) Jacobson; (penalty missed) Freeman; (penalty scored) Horgan; (penalty missed) Kashket

16 September 2020 Second round	Southampton	0–2	Brentford	Southampton
19:45 BST	McCarthy (yellow card) 8'	Report	Thompson (yellow card) 12'; Nørgaard 40'; Dasilva 45+1'; Dalsgaard (yellow card) 52'; Goode (yellow card) 58'	Stadium: St Mary's Stadium; Attendance: 0 Referee: John Brooks

22 September 2020 Third round	West Bromwich Albion	2–2 (4–5 p)	Brentford	West Bromwich
19:00 BST	Robson-Kanu 56' (pen.), 66' (pen.); O'Shea (yellow card) 88'	Report	Marcondes 58'; Forss 73' (pen.)	Stadium: The Hawthorns; Attendance: 0 Referee: Darren England
	Penalties
	Austin (penalty scored); Gallagher (penalty scored); Edwards (penalty scored); Townsend (penalty scored); Diangana (penalty missed)		(penalty scored) Toney; (penalty scored) Dasilva; (penalty scored) Fosu; (penalty scored) Forss; (penalty scored) Nørgaard

1 October 2020 Fourth round	Brentford	3–0	Fulham	Brentford
17:30 BST	Forss 37'; Fosu (yellow card) 47'; Benrahma 62', 77'	Report	Kamara (yellow card) 12'; Johansen (yellow card) 49'	Stadium: Brentford Community Stadium; Attendance: 0 Referee: Jonathan Moss

22 December 2020 Quarter-finals	Brentford	1–0	Newcastle United	Brentford
17:30 GMT	Dasilva 66'	Report	Shelvey (yellow card) 70'	Stadium: Brentford Community Stadium; Attendance: 0 Referee: Robert Jones

5 January 2021 Semi-finals	Tottenham Hotspur	2–0	Brentford	Tottenham
19:45 GMT	Sissoko 12'; Reguilón (yellow card) 52'; Son 70'	Report	Canós (yellow card) 14'; Janelt (yellow card) 18'; Mbeumo (yellow card) 51'; Dasilva (red card) 84'	Stadium: Tottenham Hotspur Stadium; Attendance: 0 Referee: Mike Dean
Note: For the 2020–21 season, the EFL Cup semi-finals were played over only one leg to reduce fixture congestion caused by the COVID-19 pandemic and the late start to the season.

== Statistics ==
=== Appearances and goals ===
No	Pos	Nat	Name	League		FA Cup		EFL Cup		Playoffs		Total	
No	Pos	Nat	Name	Apps	Goals	Apps	Goals	Apps	Goals	Apps	Goals	Apps	Goals
1	GK	(Spain)	David Raya	42	0	0	0	3	0	3	0	48	0
2	DF	(England)	Dominic Thompson	1 (3)	0	—		5	0	—		6 (3)	0
3	DF	(Jamaica)	Rico Henry	30	1	0	0	3 (1)	0	0 (1)	0	33 (2)	1
4	DF	(England)	Charlie Goode	4 (4)	0	0 (1)	0	3	0	0	0	7 (5)	0
5	DF	(Jamaica)	Ethan Pinnock	39	1	2	0	4	1	3	0	48	2
6	MF	(Denmark)	Christian Nørgaard	15 (2)	0	0	0	1 (3)	1	1	0	17 (5)	1
7	MF	(Spain)	Sergi Canós	33 (12)	9	1	0	4 (1)	0	3	0	41 (13)	9
8	MF	(Denmark)	Mathias Jensen	35 (10)	2	0 (1)	0	3 (1)	0	3	0	41 (12)	2
9	MF	(Denmark)	Emiliano Marcondes	12 (18)	1	0	0	4 (2)	1	2 (1)	1	18 (21)	3
10	MF	(Algeria)	Saïd Benrahma	0 (2)	0	—		1	2	—		1 (2)	2
14	MF	(England)	Josh Dasilva	26 (4)	5	0	0	4 (1)	2	0	0	30 (5)	7
15	FW	(Finland)	Marcus Forss	9 (30)	7	2	0	4 (2)	2	1 (2)	1	16 (34)	10
16	MF	(Ecuador)	Joel Valencia	0	0	—		0 (1)	0	—		0 (1)	0
17	FW	(England)	Ivan Toney	44 (1)	31	0	0	2 (2)	0	3	2	49 (3)	33
18	DF	(Sweden)	Pontus Jansson	23 (1)	0	0	0	0	0	3	0	26 (1)	0
19	MF	(France)	Bryan Mbeumo	37 (7)	8	0	0	2	0	2 (1)	0	41 (8)	8
20	MF	(Iran)	Saman Ghoddos	16 (23)	3	2	1	2	0	0 (3)	0	20 (26)	4
21	FW	(Turkey)	Halil Dervişoğlu	0	0	1	1	0 (1)	0	—		1 (1)	1
22	DF	(Denmark)	Henrik Dalsgaard	34 (1)	2	0	0	2	0	2 (1)	0	38 (2)	2
24	MF	(Ghana)	Tariqe Fosu	19 (20)	4	2	0	5 (1)	0	1 (1)	0	27 (22)	4
26	MF	(Grenada)	Shandon Baptiste	0 (1)	0	0	0	2 (1)	0	0	0	2 (2)	0
27	MF	(Germany)	Vitaly Janelt	36 (5)	3	1	0	2	0	3	1	42 (5)	4
28	GK	(England)	Luke Daniels	4	0	2	0	3	0	0	0	9	0
29	DF	(Denmark)	Mads Bech Sørensen	29 (3)	2	2	1	5	0	0	0	36 (3)	3
30	DF	(Denmark)	Mads Roerslev	10 (7)	0	2	0	0	0	3	0	15 (7)	0
31	MF	(Czech Republic)	Jan Žambůrek	0 (6)	0	1	0	2	0	0	0	3 (6)	0
34	FW	(Scotland)	Aaron Pressley	0 (2)	0	0 (1)	0	0	0	0	0	0 (3)	0
36	DF	(Wales)	Fin Stevens	0 (2)	0	2	0	0 (1)	0	0	0	2 (3)	0
37	MF	(Republic of Ireland)	Alex Gilbert	0	0	1 (1)	0	0	0	0	0	1 (1)	0
38	MF	(England)	Max Haygarth	0 (1)	0	0 (2)	0	0	0	0	0	0 (3)	0
39	DF	(Scotland)	Lewis Gordon	0	0	1	0	0	0	0	0	1	0
41	MF	(Denmark)	Mads Bidstrup	1 (3)	0	0	0	0	0	0 (2)	0	1 (5)	0
Players loaned in during the season
23	DF	(New Zealand)	Winston Reid	7 (3)	0	—		—		0 (1)	0	7 (4)	0

- Players listed in italics left the club mid-season
- Source: Soccerbase

=== Goalscorers ===
No	Pos	Nat	Player	FLCh.	FAC	FLCu.	FLP	Total
17	FW	(England)	Ivan Toney	31	0	0	2	33
15	FW	(Finland)	Marcus Forss	7	0	2	1	10
7	MF	(Spain)	Sergi Canós	9	0	0	0	9
19	MF	(France)	Bryan Mbeumo	8	0	0	0	8
14	MF	(England)	Josh Dasilva	5	0	2	0	7
24	MF	(Ghana)	Tariqe Fosu	4	0	0	0	4
20	MF	(Iran)	Saman Ghoddos	3	1	0	0	4
27	MF	(Germany)	Vitaly Janelt	3	0	0	1	4
29	DF	(Denmark)	Mads Bech Sørensen	2	1	0	0	3
9	MF	(Denmark)	Emiliano Marcondes	1	0	1	1	3
22	DF	(Denmark)	Henrik Dalsgaard	2	0	0	0	2
8	MF	(Denmark)	Mathias Jensen	2	0	0	0	2
5	DF	(Jamaica)	Ethan Pinnock	1	0	1	0	2
10	MF	(Algeria)	Saïd Benrahma	0	—	2	—	2
3	DF	(Jamaica)	Rico Henry	1	0	0	0	1
21	FW	(Turkey)	Halil Dervişoğlu	0	1	0	—	1
6	MF	(Denmark)	Christian Nørgaard	0	0	1	0	1
Total				79	3	9	5	96

- Players listed in italics left the club mid-season
- Source: Soccerbase

=== Discipline ===
No	Pos	Nat	Player	FLCh.		FAC		FLCu.		FLP		Total		Pts
No	Pos	Nat	Player	Yellow card	Red card	Yellow card	Red card	Yellow card	Red card	Yellow card	Red card	Yellow card	Red card	Pts
17	FW	(England)	Ivan Toney	7	1	0	0	0	0	1	0	8	1	11
27	MF	(Germany)	Vitaly Janelt	8	0	0	0	1	0	1	0	10	0	10
7	MF	(Spain)	Sergi Canós	5	0	0	0	1	0	0	0	6	0	6
22	DF	(Denmark)	Henrik Dalsgaard	4	0	0	0	1	0	1	0	6	0	6
24	MF	(Ghana)	Tariqe Fosu	4	0	0	0	1	0	0	0	5	0	5
14	MF	(England)	Josh Dasilva	2	0	0	0	0	1	0	0	2	1	5
18	DF	(Sweden)	Pontus Jansson	0	1	0	0	0	0	2	0	2	1	5
19	MF	(France)	Bryan Mbeumo	3	0	0	0	1	0	0	0	4	0	4
15	FW	(Finland)	Marcus Forss	3	0	0	0	0	0	0	0	3	0	3
9	MF	(Denmark)	Emiliano Marcondes	2	0	0	0	0	0	1	0	3	0	3
5	DF	(Jamaica)	Ethan Pinnock	0	1	0	0	0	0	0	0	0	1	3
8	MF	(Denmark)	Mathias Jensen	2	0	0	0	0	0	0	0	2	0	2
6	MF	(Denmark)	Christian Nørgaard	2	0	0	0	0	0	0	0	2	0	2
29	DF	(Denmark)	Mads Bech Sørensen	2	0	0	0	0	0	0	0	2	0	2
2	DF	(England)	Dominic Thompson	1	0	0	0	1	0	—		2	0	2
20	MF	(Iran)	Saman Ghoddos	1	0	1	0	0	0	0	0	2	0	2
41	MF	(Denmark)	Mads Bidstrup	1	0	0	0	0	0	0	0	1	0	1
1	GK	(Spain)	David Raya	1	0	0	0	0	0	0	0	1	0	1
23	DF	(New Zealand)	Winston Reid	1	0	—		—		0	0	1	0	1
31	MF	(Czech Republic)	Jan Žambůrek	0	0	1	0	0	0	0	0	1	0	1
4	DF	(England)	Charlie Goode	0	0	0	0	1	0	0	0	1	0	1
30	DF	(Denmark)	Mads Roerslev	0	0	0	0	0	0	1	0	1	0	1
Total				47	3	2	0	7	1	6	0	62	4	74

- Players listed in italics left the club mid-season.
- Source: ESPN

=== International caps ===
No	Pos	Nat	Player	Caps	Goals	Ref
5	DF	(Jamaica)	Ethan Pinnock	1	0	
6	MF	(Denmark)	Christian Nørgaard	9	0	
8	MF	(Denmark)	Mathias Jensen	12	1	
10	MF	(Algeria)	Saïd Benrahma	3	0	
15	FW	(Finland)	Marcus Forss	7	1	
18	CB	(Sweden)	Pontus Jansson	4	0	
20	MF	(Iran)	Saman Ghoddos	4	0	
21	FW	(Turkey)	Halil Dervişoğlu	3	1	
22	DF	(Denmark)	Henrik Dalsgaard	1	0	
24	MF	(Ghana)	Tariqe Fosu	4	1	

- Players listed in italics left the club mid-season
- Only international caps won while contracted to Brentford are counted.

== Awards ==
- EFL Championship Player of the Month: Ivan Toney (October 2020)
- EFL Championship Manager of the Month: Thomas Frank (December 2020)
- EFL Championship Team of the Year: Ivan Toney
- EFL Championship Golden Boot: Ivan Toney
- London Football Awards EFL Player of the Year: Ivan Toney
- EFL Cup Team of the Tournament: Luke Daniels
- EFL Cup Goal of the Round:
  - Emiliano Marcondes: third round
  - Saïd Benrahma (fourth round)
- DBU Coach of the Year: Thomas Frank
- PFA Championship Team of the Year: Rico Henry, Ethan Pinnock, Ivan Toney
- Supporters' Player of the Year: Ivan Toney
