= Tariqe Fosu =

Ghanaian footballer (born 1995)

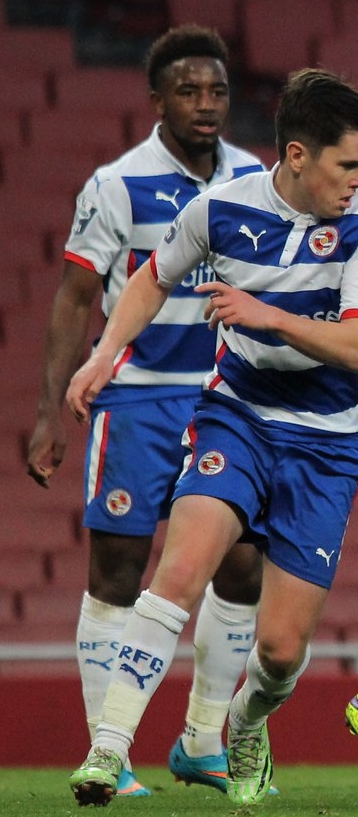
- Fosu (left) playing for Reading U21 in 2015

Personal information
- Full name: Tariqe Kumahl Malachi Akwesi Fosu
- Date of birth: 5 November 1995 (age 31)
- Place of birth: Wandsworth, England
- Height: 1.80 m (5 ft 11 in)
- Positions: Left winger; attacking midfielder

Youth career
- 2004–2014: Reading

Senior career*
Years	Team	Apps	(Gls)
2014–2017	Reading	1	(0)
2015–2016	→ Fleetwood Town (loan)	6	(1)
2016	→ Accrington Stanley (loan)	8	(3)
2016–2017	→ Colchester United (loan)	33	(5)
2017–2019	Charlton Athletic	57	(11)
2019–2020	Oxford United	25	(8)
2020–2023	Brentford	50	(5)
2022–2023	→ Stoke City (loan)	20	(0)
2023	→ Rotherham United (loan)	19	(1)
2024–2025	Northampton Town	34	(4)

International career^{‡}
2013	England U18	1	(0)
2020–	Ghana	4	(1)
- * Club domestic league appearances and goals as of 17:11, 25 June 2025 (UTC) ‡ National team caps and goals as of 18:16, 31 May 2025 (UTC)

Tariqe Kumahl Malachi Akwesi Fosu (born 5 November 1995), sometimes known as Tariqe Fosu-Henry, is a professional footballer who plays as a left winger. Born in England, Fosu plays for the Ghana national team at international level.

A product of the Reading academy, Fosu rose to prominence at Charlton Athletic and Oxford United, before transferring to Brentford in January 2020. After a 3 1/2-year spell and then a year out of football, he transferred to Northampton Town in 2024. Fosu was capped by England at U18 level and made his senior international debut for Ghana in October 2020.

== Club career ==
=== Reading ===
==== Youth years and senior debut ====
A left winger or attacking midfielder, Fosu began his career in the Reading academy at the age of 9 in 2004 and progressed to be awarded a scholarship at the end of the 2011–12 season. He was involved in numerous successes with the Royals' U18 and U21 teams and signed a professional contract during the 2013–14 season. Fosu was named in the first team squad on three occasions during the 2014–15 season and made his debut on the final day, as a substitute for Jack Stacey after 30 minutes of a 3–0 victory over Derby County.

==== 2015–16 and loans to Fleetwood Town and Accrington Stanley ====
Fosu signed a new two-year contract on 26 June 2015, but spent much of his subsequent Reading career with the U21 team or away on loan. He moved to League One club Fleetwood Town on loan until 2 January 2016. He made 7 appearances and scored his first senior goal during his spell, which came in a 5–1 victory over Swindon Town on 21 November. Fosu's November 2015 performances saw him long-listed for the PFA Fans' League One Player of the Month award. On 24 March 2016, Fosu joined promotion-chasing League Two club Accrington Stanley on loan until the end of the 2015–16 season. He made 8 appearances, scored three goals and was part of the team that was defeated by AFC Wimbledon in the League Two play-off semi-finals. Fosu's performances during April 2016 won him the League Two Player of the Month award.

==== 2016–17 and loan to Colchester United ====
On 31 August 2016, Fosu joined League One Colchester United on a half-season loan, which was subsequently extended until the end of the 2016–17 season. He made 34 appearances and scored six goals for the club. At the end of the 2016–17 season, Fosu turned down a new contract and transferred away from the Madejski Stadium.

=== Charlton Athletic ===
On 19 June 2017, Fosu joined League One club Charlton Athletic for an undisclosed nominal fee and signed a two-year contract, effective 1 July 2017. He had two successful seasons with the Addicks, scoring a perfect hat-trick (right foot, left foot and head) against former club Fleetwood Town on 30 September 2017. Fosu finished the 2017–18 season as the club's second-leading scorer and helped the club to two play-off finishes, though he missed the successful 2019 play-off campaign due to a hamstring injury. He turned down a new contract and departed the club when it expired at the end of the 2018–19 season. During two seasons at The Valley, Fosu made 65 appearances and scored 11 goals.

=== Oxford United ===
On 1 July 2019, Fosu reunited with his former Charlton Athletic manager Karl Robinson at League One club Oxford United and signed a three-year contract for an undisclosed fee. During the first half of the 2019–20 season, he scored 10 goals in 33 appearances and won the October 2019 PFA Fans' League One Player of the Month award. Fosu transferred away from the Kassam Stadium on the final day of the January 2020 transfer window.

=== Brentford ===
==== 2020–2021 ====
On 31 January 2020, Fosu transferred to Championship club Brentford, after the £750,000 release clause in his Oxford United contract was activated. He signed a 3 1/2-year contract and made 11 appearances and scored one goal during the remainder of the 2019–20 season, which ended with defeat in the 2020 Championship play-off final.

Fosu began the 2020–21 season predominantly as a substitute in league matches, before breaking into the starting lineup in late-November 2020. He scored his first goal of the season with the winner in a 2–1 victory over Bournemouth on 30 December. Fosu's performances and two goals in three league matches in January 2021 saw him nominated for the PFA Fans' Championship Player of the Month award. He finished Brentford's 2021 Championship play-off final-winning 2020–21 season with 49 appearances and four goals.

==== 2021–22 ====
Despite featuring in all but one of Brentford's 2021–22 pre-season friendlies. a move away on loan for Fosu fell through late in the summer transfer window. Despite being named in the club's 25-man Premier League squad for the first half of the regular season, he was largely frozen out of the matchday squads in all competitions. Prior to undergoing surgery on a hamstring injury suffered during training in November 2021, Fosu had been restricted to two EFL Cup appearances. Fosu returned to training in mid-January 2022 and after a loan move failed to materialise during the winter transfer window, he remained part of the club's 25-man Premier League squad during the second half of the 2021–22 season. On 20 March, Fosu was named in a Premier League squad for only the second time in the season and made his first league appearance for 10 months as a substitute for Rico Henry after 74 minutes of a 2–1 defeat to Leicester City. He remained an unused substitute during six further league matches and did not appear again before the end of the 2021–22 season.

==== 2022–23 and loans to Stoke City and Rotherham United ====
Ahead of the 2022–23 season, Fosu was not called into Brentford's pre-season training camp in Germany and only appeared in two B team friendlies. He was not issued a squad number and entering the final year of his contract, he joined Championship club Stoke City on a season-long loan on 16 August 2022. Fosu immediately assumed a starting role and his October 2022 performances were recognised with the club's Player of the Month award. He made 20 appearances prior to being dropped to the bench at the turn of the year. On 20 January 2023, Fosu was recalled from the loan and immediately sent to Championship club Rotherham United on loan until the end of the 2022–23 season. He made 19 appearances and scored one goal during his spell. Fosu was released by Brentford when his contract expired and finished his career with the club on 63 appearances and five goals.

=== Free agent ===
In August 2023, Fosu seemed set to transfer to Turkish Süper Lig club Hatayspor, but the move did not materialise. After trialling with Charlotte FC and then training with former club Charlton Athletic in early 2024, he remained a free agent during the 2023–24 season.

=== Northampton Town ===
On 9 August 2024, Fosu signed a one-year contract with League One club Northampton Town on a free transfer. He made 37 appearances and scored four goals during the 2024–25 season in which the club narrowly avoided relegation. After "a 'lack of application' in training" led to him being dropped from the matchday squad for a number of late-season matches, manager Kevin Nolan cited that Fosu had then applied himself well. Fosu entered negotiations over a new contract at the end of the season, which proved fruitless and he departed the club when his contract expired.

== International career ==
Fosu was capped by England at U18 level. He was called up to the Ghana squad for two 2021 Africa Cup of Nations qualifiers in March 2020, which were later postponed. Fosu made his first appearances for the team with starts in friendlies versus Mali and Qatar in October 2020 and he scored his first international goal in the latter match, with the opener in a 5–1 victory. Following appearances in a pair of 2021 Africa Cup of Nations qualifiers versus Sudan in November 2020, Fosu was removed from a training camp prior to a pair of friendly matches in June 2021.

== Style of play ==
An attacking player, Fosu has been described as "most comfortable on the left side of a three, he isn't a flying winger, but one who can call upon quick feet and an eye for goal to hurt the opposition. More likely to cut in from wide and shoot rather than get a ball in from the byline". Following his deployment as a right back for Ghana in October 2020, he gained further experience in the same position with Brentford during the 2020–21 season.

== Personal life ==
Fosu is of Ghanaian descent.

== Career statistics ==
=== Club ===
As of match played 3 May 2025

Appearances and goals by club, season and competition
Club	Season	League			FA Cup		EFL Cup		Other		Total	
Club	Season	Division	Apps	Goals	Apps	Goals	Apps	Goals	Apps	Goals	Apps	Goals
Reading	2014–15	Championship	1	0	0	0	0	0	—		1	0
Reading	2015–16	Championship	0	0	0	0	0	0	—		0	0
Reading	2016–17	Championship	0	0	—		0	0	0	0	0	0
Reading	Total		1	0	0	0	0	0	0	0	1	0
Reading U21	2016–17	—							1 (Note: Appearance in EFL Trophy)	0	1	0
Fleetwood Town (loan)	2015–16	League One	6	1	—		—		1	0	7	1
Accrington Stanley (loan)	2015–16	League Two	8	3	—		—		1 (Note: Appearance in League Two play-offs)	0	9	3
Colchester United (loan)	2016–17	League Two	33	5	1	1	—		0	0	34	6
Charlton Athletic	2017–18	League One	30	9	1	0	1	0	3 (Note: Two appearances in League One play-offs and one appearance in EFL Trophy)	0	35	9
Charlton Athletic	2018–19	League One	27	2	2	0	0	0	1	0	30	2
Charlton Athletic	Total		57	11	3	0	1	0	4	0	65	11
Oxford United	2019–20	League One	25	8	4	1	3	1	1	0	33	10
Brentford	2019–20	Championship	10	1	—		—		1 (Note: Appearances in Championship play-offs)	0	11	1
Brentford	2020–21	Championship	39	4	2	0	6	0	2	0	49	4
Brentford	2021–22	Premier League	1	0	0	0	2	0	—		3	0
Brentford	2022–23	Premier League	0	0	0	0	0	0	—		0	0
Brentford	Total		50	5	2	0	8	0	3	0	63	5
Stoke City (loan)	2022–23	Championship	20	0	0	0	—		—		20	0
Rotherham United (loan)	2022–23	Championship	19	1	—		—		—		19	1
Northampton Town	2024–25	League One	34	4	1	0	1	0	1	0	37	4
Career total			253	38	11	2	13	1	12	0	289	41

=== International ===
As of match played 12 June 2021

Appearances and goals by national team and year
National team	Year	Apps	Goals
Ghana	2020	4	1
Total		4	1

Scores and results list Ghana's goal tally first, score column indicates score after each Fosu goal.

List of international goals scored by Tariqe Fosu
No.	Date	Venue	Opponent	Score	Result	Competition	Ref.
1	12 October 2020	Mardan Sports Complex, Antalya, Turkey	Qatar	1–0	5–1	Friendly	

== Honours ==
Reading

- U21 Premier League Cup: 2013–14

Charlton Athletic

- EFL League One play-offs: 2019

Brentford

- EFL Championship play-offs: 2021

Individual

- Football League Two Player of the Month: April 2016
- Oxford United Player of the Month: September 2019, October 2019
- PFA Fans' League One Player of the Month: October 2019
- Stoke City Player of the Month: October 2022
