= Josh Dasilva =

English footballer (born 1998)

Personal information
- Full name: Pelenda Joshua Tunga Dasilva
- Date of birth: 23 October 1998 (age 28)
- Place of birth: Ilford, England
- Height: 6 ft 0 in (1.84 m)
- Position: Midfielder

Team information
- Current team: Brentford
- Number: 10

Youth career
- 2006–2015: Arsenal

Senior career*
Years	Team	Apps	(Gls)
2015–2018	Arsenal	0	(0)
2018–	Brentford	139	(20)

International career
2017	England U19	3	(0)
2017–2019	England U20	9	(0)
2020	England U21	5	(1)
- * Club domestic league appearances and goals as of 13:25, 4 September 2026 (UTC)

Pelenda Joshua Tunga Dasilva (born 23 October 1998) is an English professional footballer who plays as a midfielder for Premier League club Brentford.

Dasilva is a graduate of Arsenal's Hale End Academy. In search of a pathway into senior football, he transferred to Brentford in 2018. Dasilva was part of the Brentford squad that was promoted to the Premier League in 2021.

Dasilva was capped by England at youth level and was part of the 2017 UEFA European U19 Championship-winning squad.

== Club career ==
=== Arsenal ===
Dasilva began his career with Arsenal and joined the club's Hale End academy at the age of eight. He progressed through the ranks and moved from left wing to forward, before settling into a box-to-box midfield role, under the guidance of Thierry Henry and Kwame Ampadu. After scoring 28 goals during the first year of his scholarship, he signed his first professional contract in August 2015 and was an unused substitute for the first team on two occasions during the 2016–17 season. Dasilva was an unused substitute on seven occasions during the first half of the 2017–18 season and made three appearances, all in EFL Cup matches. Despite progressing into the U23 team, Dasilva failed to see a pathway into the first team squad turned down a new contract at the end of the 2017–18 season. He was released on 30 June 2018.

=== Brentford ===
==== 2018–19 season ====
On 21 August 2018, Dasilva joined Championship club Brentford on a four-year contract, with the option of an further year, on a free transfer. After overcoming some fitness issues, he made his debut as a substitute for Josh McEachran late in a 2–0 win over Millwall on 3 November 2018. Either side of the New Year, Dasilva made sporadic substitute appearances in league matches and made two FA Cup starts, before breaking into the starting lineup in March 2019. On 19 April 2019, he scored the first senior goal of his career in the return match versus Millwall, with "an unstoppable curling effort into the top corner from 30 yards", which secured a 1–1 draw. Dasilva finished the 2018–19 season with 21 appearances and one goal.

==== 2019–20 season ====
After beginning the 2019–20 season in a substitute role, Dasilva heeded head coach Thomas Frank's call to up his work rate and intensity. He subsequently broke into the starting lineup in early October 2019 and came into form, scoring six goals in a 10-match spell, which included the first hat-trick of his career in a 7–0 win over Luton Town on 30 November. His November 2019 performances saw him nominated for the EFL Championship Player of the Month award. By the time Brentford's season ended with defeat in the 2020 Championship play-off final, Dasilva had made 47 appearances and scored 10 goals.

==== 2020–21 season ====
During the 2020–21 season, after seven appearances and two goals, Dasilva signed a new four-year contract on 4 October 2020. His performance and goal in a 1–0 EFL Cup quarter-final victory over Premier League club Newcastle United on 22 December was recognised with a place in the EFL Cup Team of the Round. In the following round versus Tottenham Hotspur, Dasilva was sent off for the first time in his senior career after receiving a straight red card for a challenge on Pierre-Emile Højbjerg. By the time his season was ended by a hip injury in late February 2021, Dasilva had made 35 appearances and scored seven goals. In his absence, Brentford were promoted to the Premier League after victory in the 2021 Championship play-off final.

==== 2021–22 season ====
Having spent four of the previous six months on crutches, Dasilva was left off Brentford's 25-man Premier League squad for the first half of the 2021–22 season. After the window transfer window closed, he was named in the club's updated 25-man Premier League squad. Following two behind closed doors friendly appearances, Dasilva made his first competitive appearance of the season as a substitute for Mads Roerslev after 72 minutes of a 4–1 FA Cup fourth round defeat to Everton on 5 February 2022. Dasilva was sent off on his fourth league appearance on 26 February and a hamstring injury suffered while suspended saw him miss a further seven weeks. He played the remainder of the season in a substitute role and ended the campaign with 10 appearances.

==== 2022–23 season ====
Following off-season training with a personal coach, alongside former Arsenal teammate Marcus McGuane, Dasilva returned fully fit for the 2022–23 season and he scored in each of his first two appearances of the regular season. Dasilva's 39 appearances was his highest tally since the 2019–20 season, though two-thirds of them came as a substitute. Dasilva's opening day goal versus Leicester City (one of four goals he scored during the season) was cited as Brentford head coach Thomas Frank's "moment of the season", who admitted he "got emotional just thinking about it. (Dasilva's) been out for 18 months; almost a year, then a setback and another setback".

==== 2023–2025 ====
Following his first appearance of the 2023–24 season, in Brentford's second match of the campaign, Dasilva missed more than four months due to a hamstring injury. He returned to match play with a start in a 1–1 FA Cup third round draw with Wolverhampton Wanderers on 5 January 2024. Following three further appearances, he suffered a season-ending "significant" injury to the anterior cruciate ligament, medial collateral ligament and meniscus in his right knee in training in early February, for which he underwent surgery. On 17 May 2024, it was announced that Dasilva had signed a new one-year contract, with the option of a further year. Dasilva underwent two further operations and missed the entire 2024–25 season.

==== 2025–2026 ====
Despite being out of contract, Dasilva continued his rehabilitation with the club during the 2025 off-season and into the 2025–26 regular season. On 23 October 2025, Dasilva signed a new contract, running until the end of the 2025–26 season, with the option of a further year attached. By February 2026, Dasilva had returned to "modified" training with the first team squad. On 2 May 2026, he made his first appearance since 31 January 2024, as a substitute late in a 3–0 win over West Ham United. Dasilva made one further substitute appearance prior to the end of the 2025–26 season and the club exercised its one-year option on his contract.

Dasilva played a full part in the 2026–27 pre-season, until suffering a hamstring injury during an U21 match early in the regular season.

== International career ==
Dasilva was a part of the England U19 squad which won the 2017 UEFA European U19 Championship and he made three appearances in the tournament. He appeared in each match of the U20 team's 2017–18 Under 20 Elite League campaign and was a late inclusion in the squad for the 2019 Toulon Tournament. Dasilva won five caps and scored one goal for England at U21 level, all in 2021 UEFA European U21 Championship qualifying matches. In February 2020, Dasilva stated that he would be open to playing for Angola and in May 2023, he was contacted by DR Congo.

== Personal life ==
Dasilva is of Angolan descent. He is a Christian and was baptised in May 2025. Dasilva attended Beal High School in Redbridge, London.

== Career statistics ==
As of match played 17 May 2026

Appearances and goals by club, season and competition
Club	Season	League			FA Cup		EFL Cup		Europe		Other		Total	
Club	Season	Division	Apps	Goals	Apps	Goals	Apps	Goals	Apps	Goals	Apps	Goals	Apps	Goals
Arsenal	2016–17	Premier League	0	0	0	0	0	0	0	0	—		0	0
Arsenal	2017–18	Premier League	0	0	0	0	3	0	0	0	0	0	3	0
Arsenal	Total		0	0	0	0	3	0	0	0	0	0	3	0
Brentford	2018–19	Championship	17	1	4	0	0	0	—		—		21	1
Brentford	2019–20	Championship	42	10	2	0	0	0	—		3 (Note: Appearances in Championship play-offs)	0	47	10
Brentford	2020–21	Championship	30	5	0	0	5	2	—		0	0	35	7
Brentford	2021–22	Premier League	9	0	1	0	0	0	—		—		10	0
Brentford	2022–23	Premier League	36	4	1	0	2	0	—		—		39	4
Brentford	2023–24	Premier League	3	0	2	0	0	0	—		—		5	0
Brentford	2024–25	Premier League	0	0	0	0	0	0	—		—		0	0
Brentford	2025–26	Premier League	2	0	0	0	0	0	—		—		2	0
Brentford	2026–27	Premier League	0	0	0	0	0	0	—		—		0	0
Brentford	Total		139	20	10	0	7	2	—		3	0	159	22
Career total			139	20	10	0	10	2	0	0	3	0	162	22

== Honours ==
England U19

- UEFA European U19 Championship: 2017
