= Rico Henry =

Jamaican footballer (born 1997)

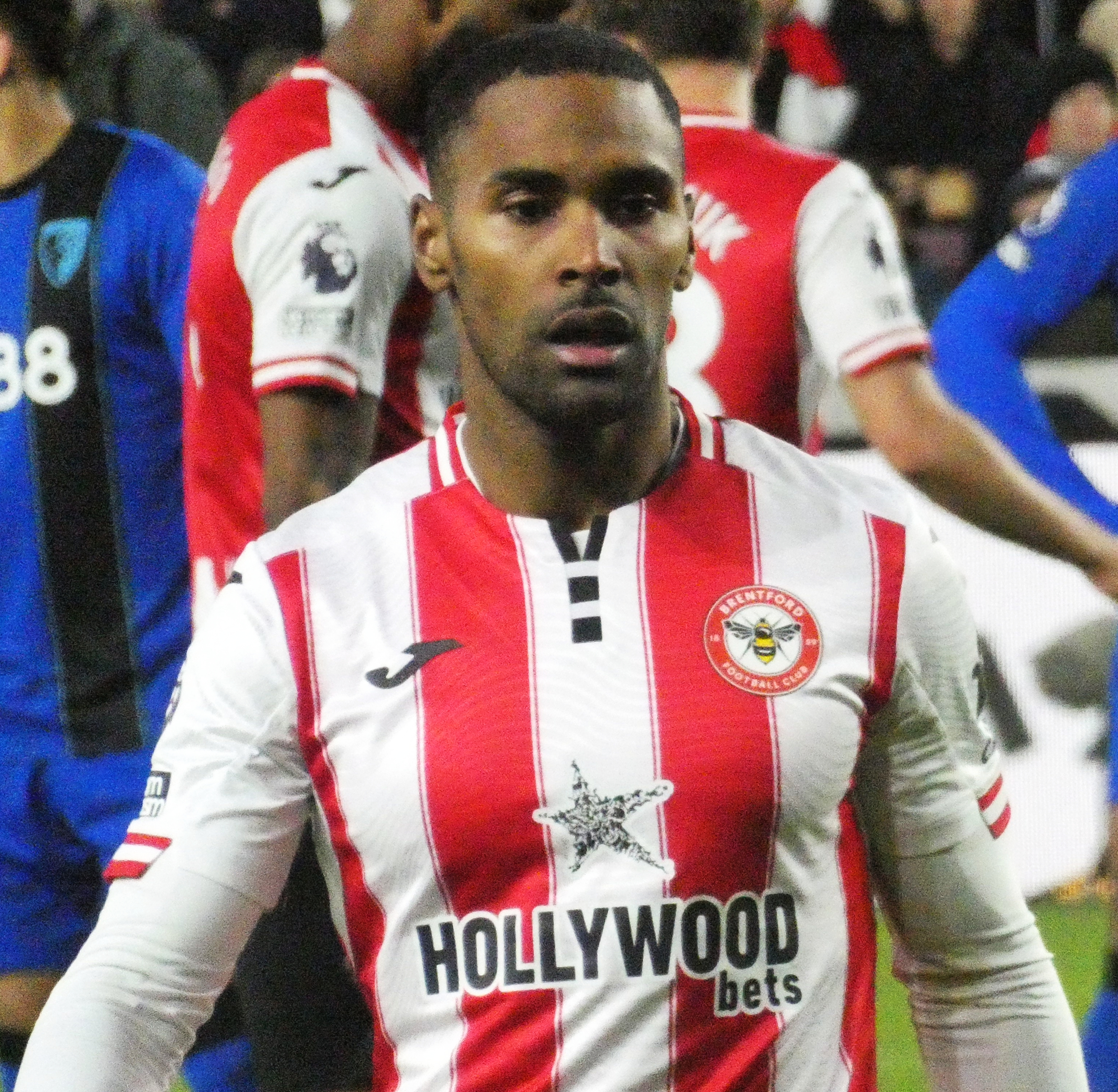
- Henry playing for Brentford in 2025

Personal information
- Full name: Rico Antonio Henry
- Date of birth: 8 July 1997 (age 29)
- Place of birth: Birmingham, England
- Height: 5 ft 7 in (1.70 m)
- Position: Left-back

Team information
- Current team: Brentford
- Number: 3

Youth career
- Cadbury Athletic
- –2014: Walsall

Senior career*
Years	Team	Apps	(Gls)
2014–2016	Walsall	46	(2)
2016–	Brentford	216	(5)

International career^{‡}
2015–2016	England U19	4	(0)
2017	England U20	3	(0)
2025–	Jamaica	1	(0)
- * Club domestic league appearances and goals as of 19:13, 22 August 2026 (UTC) ‡ National team caps and goals as of 12:35, 19 November 2025 (UTC)

Rico Antonio Henry (born 8 July 1997) is a professional footballer who plays as a left-back for Premier League club Brentford. Born in England, he plays for the Jamaica national team.

Henry is a product of the Walsall academy and began his senior career with the club. He transferred to Brentford in 2016 and passed 200 appearances for the club in August 2023. Born in England and of Jamaican descent, he represented England at youth international level, before making his senior debut for the Jamaica national team in 2025.

== Club career ==
=== Walsall ===
After a spell with Cadbury Athletic and failing a trial with Aston Villa, Henry joined Walsall at age 11 and at age 14 he was converted from a central midfielder to a left back. He progressed through the youth ranks to make his first non-competitive senior appearance for the club shortly after his 16th birthday, in a pre-season friendly versus Leeds United in July 2013. One year later, he signed his first professional contract after impressing for the club's youth team. Henry received his maiden calls into the first team squad for two League One matches in September and October 2014 respectively, before making his competitive debut with a start in a Football League Trophy northern area semi-final shootout win over Tranmere Rovers on 9 December. He made his league debut four days later, playing the full 90 minutes of a 3–1 victory over Barnsley. Henry made eight further appearances during the 2014–15 season, but his progress was disrupted by a dislocated shoulder. He signed a two-year contract extension in April 2015 and was named as Walsall's Young Player of the Year.

Henry broke into the starting line-up on a full-time basis during the 2015–16 season. He had a successful season, making 44 appearances, scoring three goals, signing a new three-year contract and winning England youth international recognition. Walsall consistently challenged for promotion during the season and finished in third position to qualify for a place in the 2016 League One play-offs, but Henry's season ended with a 6–1 aggregate defeat to the eventually-promoted club Barnsley in the semi-finals. He was recognised for his performances during the season, winning the September 2015 Football League Young Player of the Month award, in addition to being named in the League One PFA Team of the Year and receiving a nomination for the Football League Young Player of the Year award.

Henry made three early-2016–17 season appearances, before suffering a dislocation to the same shoulder previously injured in February 2015 after half an hour of 0–0 draw with Oldham Athletic on 13 August 2016. The Oldham appearance proved to be Henry's last for Walsall and he departed the Bescot Stadium on 31 August. He made 57 appearances and scored three goals for the club.

=== Brentford ===
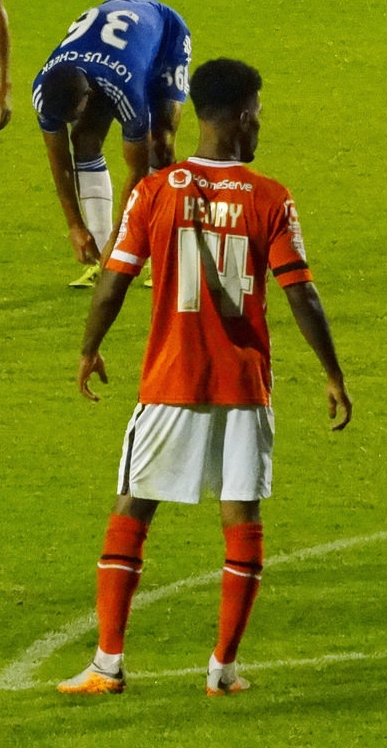
Henry playing for Walsall in 2015

On 31 August 2016, Henry signed for Championship club Brentford for an initial fee of £1.5m on a five-year contract, rising to £5 million. The transfer reunited Henry with former Walsall manager Dean Smith and the fee made him the Bees' record transfer fee paid for a teenager. He underwent surgery on the dislocated shoulder on 8 September and after returning to fitness, he made his first Brentford appearance on 21 February 2017, with a start in a 2–1 victory over Sheffield Wednesday. He immediately replaced Tom Field as head coach Dean Smith's first-choice left-back and made 12 appearances before his season was ended by a knee injury suffered in training in early May 2017.

Henry returned fit for the start of the 2017–18 season, but his season was ended on his eighth appearance by an anterior cruciate ligament injury suffered in a 2–2 draw with Middlesbrough on 30 September 2017, which required surgery. Henry returned to full-contact training in October 2018 and on 24 November, he made his first appearance for nearly 14 months, coincidentally against Middlesbrough, with a late substitute appearance in a 2–1 defeat. He scored his first goal for the club in a 3–1 win over Stoke City on 12 January 2019 and his performances throughout the month led to his nomination for the PFA Fans' Player of the Month award. A foot injury suffered in February saw Henry miss two months of the season and he finished an injury-affected campaign with 16 appearances and one goal.

Henry began the 2019–20 season fully fit and signed a new four-year contract in August 2019. He made a career-high 51 appearances during the season, which culminated in defeat in the 2020 Championship play-off final. By the time Henry's 2020–21 season was disrupted by a torn hamstring suffered in February 2021, he had appeared in all but one league match so far during the campaign. Henry returned for the end-of-season playoffs, but after making a substitute cameo in the semi-final first leg versus AFC Bournemouth, he was ruled out for the remainder of the season with a meniscus tear. In his absence, Brentford were promoted to the Premier League with victory in the 2021 Championship play-off final. In recognition of his performances during the 2020–21 season, Henry was named in the PFA Championship Team of the Year.

Henry began the 2021–22 Premier League season as an ever-present at left wing back and he scored in successive league matches in November 2021, which doubled his goalscoring tally for the club. In March 2022, Henry signed a new four-year contract, with the option of a further year and finished a mid-table 2021–22 season with 37 appearances and three goals. He improved his appearance tally to 39 appearances in all competitions during the 2022–23 season.

Henry started the 2023–24 season as an ever-present in league matches, but he suffered an anterior cruciate ligament injury on his fifth appearance, in a 1–0 defeat to Newcastle United on 16 September 2023. He returned to full training in August 2024, but a "minor setback" the following month put his return to full training back to 4 October 2024. Following involvement in unpublicised behind closed doors matches, Henry returned to competitive match play with a start in a 1–0 FA Cup third round defeat to Plymouth Argyle on 11 January 2025. After one further appearance, he missed 2 1/2 months with a hamstring injury. After recovering, he made four appearances during the remainder of the 2024–25 season, all as a substitute.

Henry entered the 2025–26 season fully fit and made 30 appearances, predominantly as a starter, prior to suffering a season-ending hamstring injury in March 2026. The one-year option on Henry's contract was triggered by the club at the end of the season. He returned to match play during the 2026–27 pre-season.

== International career ==
Born in England, Henry is of Jamaican descent. While an U12, he was a member of the England team that competed at the 2008 Danone Nations Cup. On 10 November 2015, Henry received his first call-up to the England U19 squad for friendly matches against the Netherlands and Japan. He won four caps at U19 level. Henry was named in England's U20 squad for the 2017 Four Nations Tournament and appeared in all three matches as the Young Lions won the competition. Henry was named in the England squad for the 2017 U20 World Cup, but was forced to withdraw due to injury.

Henry switched his allegiance to Jamaica in 2025. In November of that year, Henry was named in the Jamaica squad for two 2026 World Cup qualifiers against Trinidad and Tobago and Curaçao. He made his debut on 13 November 2025 in a 1–1 draw with Trinidad and Tobago, just two days after receiving his Jamaican passport.

== Style of play ==
Henry has been described as "a forward-thinking, modern-day full-back, with energy, pace and a keen defensive awareness".

== Personal life ==
Henry was born in Birmingham, West Midlands and watched both Aston Villa and Birmingham City as a youth. He attended St George's Church of England Primary School and Lordswood Boys' School in Birmingham.

== Career statistics ==
=== Club ===
As of match played 22 August 2026

Appearances and goals by club, season and competition
Club	Season	League			FA Cup		League Cup		Other		Total	
Club	Season	Division	Apps	Goals	Apps	Goals	Apps	Goals	Apps	Goals	Apps	Goals
Walsall	2014–15	League One	9	0	0	0	0	0	1 (Note: Appearance in Football League Trophy)	0	10	0
Walsall	2015–16	League One	35	2	4	0	3	1	2 (Note: Appearances in League One play-offs)	0	44	3
Walsall	2016–17	League One	2	0	—		1	0	0	0	3	0
Walsall	Total		46	2	4	0	4	1	3	0	57	3
Brentford	2016–17	Championship	12	0	0	0	—		—		12	0
Brentford	2017–18	Championship	8	0	0	0	0	0	—		8	0
Brentford	2018–19	Championship	14	1	2	0	0	0	—		16	1
Brentford	2019–20	Championship	46	0	1	0	1	0	3 (Note: Appearance(s) in Championship play-offs)	0	51	0
Brentford	2020–21	Championship	30	1	0	0	4	0	1	0	35	1
Brentford	2021–22	Premier League	34	3	1	0	2	0	—		37	3
Brentford	2022–23	Premier League	37	0	1	0	1	0	—		39	0
Brentford	2023–24	Premier League	5	0	0	0	0	0	—		5	0
Brentford	2024–25	Premier League	5	0	1	0	0	0	—		6	0
Brentford	2025–26	Premier League	25	0	1	0	4	0	—		30	0
Brentford	2026–27	Premier League	0	0	0	0	0	0	—		0	0
Brentford	Total		216	5	7	0	12	0	4	0	239	5
Career total			262	7	11	0	16	1	7	0	296	8

=== International ===
As of match played 13 November 2025

Appearances and goals by national team and year
National team	Year	Apps	Goals
Jamaica	2025	1	0
Total		1	0

== Honours ==
England U20

- Four Nations Tournament: 2017

Individual

- PFA Championship Team of the Year: 2020–21
- PFA League One Team of the Year: 2015–16
- Football League Young Player of the Month: September 2015
- Walsall Young Player of the Year: 2014–15
