= Jan Žambůrek =

Czech football midfielder (born 2001)

Personal information
- Full name: Jan Žambůrek
- Date of birth: 13 February 2001 (age 25)
- Place of birth: Prague, Czech Republic
- Height: 1.82 m (6 ft 0 in)
- Position: Midfielder

Team information
- Current team: ADO Den Haag
- Number: 8

Youth career
- 2009–2015: Bohemians 1905
- 2015–2018: Slavia Prague

Senior career*
Years	Team	Apps	(Gls)
2018–2022	Brentford	23	(0)
2020–2021	→ Shrewsbury Town (loan)	6	(0)
2022–2024	Viborg	35	(1)
2023–2024	→ Slovan Liberec (loan)	23	(2)
2024–2026	Heracles Almelo	46	(0)
2026–	ADO Den Haag	5	(0)

International career
2016	Czech Republic U15	4	(0)
2016–2017	Czech Republic U16	14	(2)
2017–2018	Czech Republic U17	5	(1)
2018–2019	Czech Republic U18	13	(1)
2019–2020	Czech Republic U19	9	(1)
2021–2023	Czech Republic U21	15	(0)
- * Club domestic league appearances and goals as of 18:30, 17 October 2026 (UTC)

Jan Žambůrek (born 13 February 2001) is a Czech professional footballer who plays as a central midfielder for Eredivisie club ADO Den Haag.

Žambůrek is a product of the Slavia Prague academy and made his professional breakthrough with Brentford in 2019. After falling out of favour, he transferred to Danish club Viborg in January 2022. After failing to establish himself and a season on loan in his home country with Slovan Liberec, Žambůrek transferred to Dutch club Heracles Almelo in 2024. After the club's relegation to the Eerste Divisie in 2026, he transferred to ADO Den Haag. Žambůrek was capped by the Czech Republic at youth level.

== Club career ==
=== Slavia Prague ===
A central midfielder, Žambůrek began his career in the academies at Bohemians 1905 and Slavia Prague and progressed to U19 level with the latter club. He was a part of the U17 team which won the 2017–18 league and cup double and left the club in August 2018.

=== Brentford ===
==== 2018–19 season ====
On 9 August 2018, Žambůrek moved to England to sign a three-year contract with the B team at Championship club Brentford on a free transfer, with the option of a further year. Žambůrek received his maiden call into the first team squad for a league match versus Hull City on 23 February 2019 and with the match safe at 5–1, he made the first senior appearance of his career as a late substitute for Saïd Benrahma. The appearance made him the first player born in the 21st century to play a competitive match for the club. He played out the season with the B team and was a part of the 2018–19 Middlesex Senior Cup-winning squad.

==== 2019–20 season ====
Žambůrek spent the 2019–20 pre-season with the first team group and after making two early-regular season appearances, he signed a new four-year contract and was promoted into the first team squad. By late October 2019, he had broken into the team as a regular substitute. In January 2020, Žambůrek's performances at club and international level during 2019 were recognised with a runner-up finish in voting for the FACR's Young Player of the Year award. He finished the season with 19 appearances, but did not feature in Brentford's unsuccessful playoff campaign.

==== 2020–2022 ====
After making just two EFL Cup appearances during the first month of the 2020–21 season, Žambůrek joined League One club Shrewsbury Town on loan until the end of the 2020–21 season. He made 9 appearances before the loan was terminated on 11 January 2021. Žambůrek made seven further appearances during the second half of the season. Due to injury, Žambůrek was not involved during Brentford's playoff campaign, which culminated in promotion to the Premier League after victory in the 2021 Championship play-off final. He made his return to match play as a half-time substitute during the B team's final 2021–22 pre-season friendly and remained with the team during the first half of the regular season. Žambůrek transferred away from Brentford on 12 January 2022, after making 29 first team appearances during 3 1/2 years with the club.

=== Viborg ===
On 12 January 2022, Žambůrek signed a 3 1/2-year contract with Danish Superliga club Viborg for an undisclosed fee. The move reunited him with his former Brentford B head coach Lars Friis. He ended the 2021–22 season with 14 appearances and was a member of the squad which qualified for the 2022–23 Europa Conference League second qualifying round via a playoff. Žambůrek made 28 appearances and scored one goal during a 2022–23 season in which the club missed out on European qualification, following defeat in the playoff.

After seeing his playing time reduced due to an influx of new midfield signings, Žambůrek joined Czech First League club Slovan Liberec on loan until the end of the 2023–24 season on 1 September 2023. He made 26 appearances and scored two goals during a season which culminated in defeat in the division's Europa Conference League play-offs. Žambůrek transferred away from Viborg in July 2024.

=== Heracles Almelo ===
On 3 July 2024, Žambůrek moved to the Netherlands to sign a four-year contract with Eredivisie club Heracles Almelo for an undisclosed fee. Following surgery on a knee injury, he joined the matchday squad on 6 October 2024 and made 24 appearances during the remainder of the 2024–25 season. Žambůrek made 29 appearances during the 2025–26 season, in which the club was relegated to the Eerste Divisie. Žambůrek transferred out of the club in July 2026 and ended his two seasons at the Asito Stadion on 53 appearances.

=== ADO Den Haag ===
On 14 July 2026, Žambůrek transferred to Eredivisie club ADO Den Haag and signed a four-year contract for an undisclosed fee.

== International career ==
Žambůrek was capped by the Czech Republic at U15, U16, U17, U18, U19 and U21 level. He won his maiden U20 call-up for a friendly versus Slovakia on 5 September 2020, but was released from the squad prior to the match. Žambůrek was named as standby for the U21 team's 2021 European U21 Championship qualifier versus Greece on 13 November 2020, but he was not named in the matchday squad. In March 2021, he was named as a standby for the Czechs' 2021 UEFA European U21 Championship tournament finals squad. Žambůrek won his first full U21 call up for a pair of 2023 European U21 Championship qualifiers versus Kosovo in October 2021 and started in both matches. Žambůrek was named in the Czechs' 2023 UEFA European U21 Championship finals squad and he started in each of the team's matches prior to its group stage exit. He finished his U21 career with 15 caps.

== Personal life ==
After joining Brentford, Žambůrek enrolled at West Thames College.

== Career statistics ==
As of match played 27 October 2026

Appearances and goals by club, season and competition
Club	Season	League			National cup (Note: Includes FA Cup, Danish Cup, Czech Cup, KNVB Cup)		League cup (Note: Includes EFL Cup)		Europe		Other		Total	
Club	Season	Division	Apps	Goals	Apps	Goals	Apps	Goals	Apps	Goals	Apps	Goals	Apps	Goals
Brentford	2018–19	Championship	1	0	0	0	0	0	―		―		1	0
Brentford	2019–20	Championship	16	0	2	0	1	0	―		0	0	19	0
Brentford	2020–21	Championship	6	0	1	0	2	0	―		0	0	9	0
Brentford	Total		23	0	3	0	3	0	―		0	0	29	0
Shrewsbury Town (loan)	2020–21	League One	6	0	―		―		―		3 (Note: Appearances in EFL Trophy)	0	9	0
Viborg FF	2021–22	Danish Superliga	13	0	―		―		―		1 (Note: Appearance in Danish Superliga European play-offs)	0	14	0
Viborg FF	2022–23	Danish Superliga	19	1	3	0	―		6 (Note: Appearances in Europa Conference League)	0	0	0	28	1
Viborg FF	2023–24	Danish Superliga	3	0	0	0	―		―		―		3	0
Viborg FF	Total		35	1	3	0	―		6	0	1	0	45	1
Slovan Liberec (loan)	2023–24	Czech First League	23	2	2	0	―		―		1 (Note: Appearance in Czech First League European play-offs)	0	26	2
Heracles Almelo	2024–25	Eredivisie	20	0	4	0	―		―		―		24	0
Heracles Almelo	2025–26	Eredivisie	26	0	3	0	―		―		―		29	0
Heracles Almelo	Total		46	0	7	0	―		―		―		53	0
ADO Den Haag	2026–27	Eredivisie	5	0	1	0	―		―		―		6	0
Career total			138	3	17	0	3	0	6	0	5	0	169	3

== Honours ==
Brentford B

- Middlesex Senior Cup: 2018–19

Czech Republic U18

- SportChain Cup: 2019
