= Luke Daniels =

English footballer (born 1988)

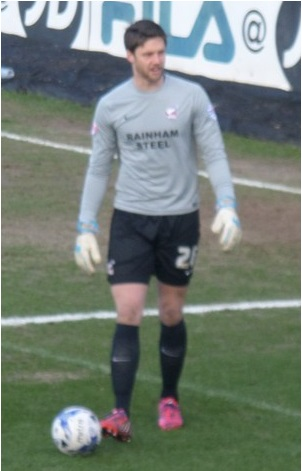
- Daniels playing for Scunthorpe United in 2015

Personal information
- Full name: Luke Matthew Daniels
- Date of birth: 5 January 1988 (age 38)
- Place of birth: Bolton, England
- Height: 6 ft 1 in (1.85 m)
- Position: Goalkeeper

Youth career
- 1997–2004: Manchester United
- 2004–2006: West Bromwich Albion

Senior career*
Years	Team	Apps	(Gls)
2006–2015	West Bromwich Albion	1	(0)
2008	→ Motherwell (loan)	2	(0)
2008–2009	→ Shrewsbury Town (loan)	38	(0)
2009–2010	→ Tranmere Rovers (loan)	37	(0)
2010	→ Charlton Athletic (loan)	0	(0)
2010	→ Rochdale (loan)	1	(0)
2011	→ Bristol Rovers (loan)	9	(0)
2011–2012	→ Southend United (loan)	9	(0)
2015–2017	Scunthorpe United	101	(0)
2017–2021	Brentford	17	(0)
2021–2023	Middlesbrough	12	(0)
2023–2024	Forest Green Rovers	19	(0)
2024–2025	Barrow	0	(0)
Total		246	(0)

International career
2006	England U18	1	(0)
2006	England U19	2	(0)
- * Club domestic league appearances and goals

Luke Matthew Daniels (born 5 January 1988) is a retired English professional footballer who played as a goalkeeper.

Daniels is product of the Manchester United and West Bromwich Albion academies and played much of the early years of his career away on loan from the latter club. He transferred to League One club Scunthorpe United in 2015 and served as first-choice goalkeeper until 2017, when he transferred to Championship club Brentford. Daniels held a backup role until transferring across the division to Middlesbrough in 2021. Following a two-year spell during which he appeared sparingly, Daniels dropped two divisions to transfer to Forest Green Rovers in 2023. He played one further season before retiring in 2024. Daniels won three caps for England at U18 and U19 level.

== Club career ==
=== West Bromwich Albion ===
==== 2004–2008 ====
A goalkeeper, Daniels began his career in the academy at Manchester United, before moving to the academy at West Bromwich Albion in 2004. Upon completing his scholarship, he signed his first professional contract with the club in July 2006. The departure of second-choice goalkeeper Russell Hoult in January 2007 led to Daniels being temporarily promoted onto the substitutes' bench for the majority of the remaining matches of the 2006–07 season. Though he failed to make an appearance, he signed a new two-year contract at the end of the season.

==== 2007–2010 ====
Following a loan away at Scottish Premier League club Motherwell during the second half of the 2007–08 season, Daniels spent the entire 2008–09 and 2009–10 seasons away on loan at League Two and League One clubs Shrewsbury Town and Tranmere Rovers respectively. He made more than 40 appearances for both clubs and reached the 2008 League Two play-off final with Shrewsbury Town, which was lost 3–2 to Stockport County. Daniels signed a two-year contract extension with West Bromwich Albion in July 2009.

==== 2010–2013 ====
Daniels spent much of the 2010–11 season away on loan at League One clubs Bristol Rovers (two spells), Charlton Athletic and Rochdale. Daniels was called into a West Bromwich Albion matchday squad for the first time in nearly four years for two League Cup matches early in the 2011–12 season, but remained an unused substitute in both. His final loan away from The Hawthorns began in October 2011, when he spent the remainder of 2011 with League Two club Southend United. During the second half of the 2011–12 season, he became regular backup to Márton Fülöp. Daniels backed up Boaz Myhill during the first half of the 2012–13 season, but failed to feature during the second half of the campaign. He signed a new two-year contract in March 2013.

==== 2013–14 ====
Daniels received his first call up of the 2013–14 season onto the bench for a Premier League match versus Everton and he made his long-awaited Baggies debut as a 77th-minute substitute for the injured Ben Foster and helped the team to a 0–0 draw. He made his first start for the club in the following game, keeping another clean sheet in a 3–0 League Cup second round victory over Newport County. He also started in the following round against Arsenal and helped to keep the score at 1–1 before the Gunners sealed victory on penalties. The injury to Ben Foster allowed Daniels to continue as second-choice goalkeeper behind Boaz Myhill until 14 December 2013, when he received his final first team call up of the 2013–14 season.

==== 2014–15 ====
Daniels was called up for two Premier League matches in October and November 2014, but remained an unused substitute on both occasions. In the final year of his contract, he left the club on 22 January 2015, having made just three first team appearances during 8 1/2 years as a professional at The Hawthorns. Over the course of his loans away from the club, Daniels made 114 appearances.

=== Scunthorpe United ===
On 22 January 2015, Daniels signed a 2 1/2-year contract with League One club Scunthorpe United for an undisclosed fee. The Iron were without first and second-choice goalkeepers Sam Slocombe and James Severn due to broken arms. Daniels made 23 appearances in what remained of the 2014–15 season. He made 44 and 42 appearances during the 2015–16 and the 2016–17 seasons respectively and kept more clean sheets than any other goalkeeper in League One during that period, with 27 in 78 matches. Daniels departed the club in May 2017, after his contract expired. He made 109 appearances during his 2 1/2-year spell at Glanford Park.

=== Brentford ===
On 24 May 2017, Daniels joined Championship club Brentford on a free transfer and signed a three-year contract, with an option for a further year, effective 1 July 2017. Daniels appeared in each of the club's four cup matches during the 2017–18 season and made his league debut versus Hull City on the final day, in which he helped preserve a 1–1 draw by saving a second-half penalty. Aside from cup appearances and two league starts, Daniels was again backup to Dan Bentley for the majority of the 2018–19 season. A season-ending shoulder injury suffered by Bentley in March 2019 allowed Daniels a run in the team in league matches and he finished the season with 19 appearances in all competitions.

Daniels served as backup to new goalkeeper signing David Raya during the 2019–20 season. It was announced on 4 January 2020 that Daniels has signed a one-year contract extension, with the option of a further year. Later that day, he captained an under-strength XI to a 1–0 FA Cup third round victory over Stoke City. Daniels finished the 2019–20 season with three cup appearances and did not feature during Brentford's unsuccessful playoff campaign.

With David Raya unavailable, Daniels started six of Brentford's first seven matches of the 2020–21 season. Despite reverting to his backup role behind Raya in October 2020, Daniels continued to play in cup matches and his performance in a 1–0 EFL Cup quarter-final victory over Newcastle United on 22 December was recognised with a place in the EFL Cup Team of the Round. Daniels' performances in his three appearances during Brentford's run to the semi-finals of the EFL Cup saw him named in the Team of the Tournament. He finished the 2020–21 season with nine appearances and a promotion medal, by virtue of being an unused substitute during the 2021 Championship play-off final. Daniels finished his four-season Brentford career with 36 appearances and departed the Community Stadium in June 2021.

=== Middlesbrough ===
On 9 August 2021, Daniels signed a two-year contract with Championship club Middlesbrough on a free transfer. He made 12 appearances during a 2021–22 season in which the club narrowly missed out on a play-off finish. With the 2022 off-season signings of Zack Steffen and Liam Roberts, Daniels dropped down to third-choice goalkeeper for the 2022–23 season. Daniels was an unused substitute on five occasions during the 2022–23 season and failed to make an appearance. A move away from the club during the winter transfer window failed to materialise and he was released when his contract expired.

=== Forest Green Rovers ===
On 14 July 2023, Daniels signed a one-year contract with League Two club Forest Green Rovers on a free transfer. During a 2023–24 season in which the club was relegated to the National League, ankle and quad issues restricted Daniels to 20 appearances. He was released when his contract expired and retired from football.

=== Barrow ===
Concurrent with his role as goalkeeper coach at League Two club Barrow, a role to which he was appointed in June 2024, Daniels was an unused substitute during four 2024–25-season matches, to cover for injuries.

== International career ==
Daniels made his international debut with a start for England U18 in a 2–1 friendly victory over Slovenia in April 2006. He won two U19 caps in September and October 2006, in friendlies versus the Netherlands U19 and Austria U19.

== Coaching career ==
On 28 June 2024, Daniels joined Barrow as goalkeeper coach. He departed the role on 27 February 2026.

== Personal life ==
Daniels' boyhood club was Bolton Wanderers.

== Career statistics ==
As of match played 3 May 2025

Appearances and goals by club, season and competition
Club	Season	League			National cup (Note: Includes FA Cup, Scottish Cup)		League cup (Note: Includes EFL Cup)		Other		Total	
Club	Season	Division	Apps	Goals	Apps	Goals	Apps	Goals	Apps	Goals	Apps	Goals
West Bromwich Albion	2006–07	Championship	0	0	0	0	0	0	0	0	0	0
West Bromwich Albion	2007–08	Championship	0	0	0	0	0	0	—		0	0
West Bromwich Albion	2011–12	Premier League	0	0	—		0	0	—		0	0
West Bromwich Albion	2012–13	Premier League	0	0	0	0	0	0	—		0	0
West Bromwich Albion	2013–14	Premier League	1	0	0	0	2	0	—		3	0
West Bromwich Albion	2014–15	Premier League	0	0	0	0	0	0	—		0	0
West Bromwich Albion	Total		1	0	0	0	2	0	0	0	3	0
Motherwell (loan)	2007–08	Scottish Premier League	2	0	0	0	—		—		2	0
Shrewsbury Town (loan)	2008–09	League Two	38	0	0	0	1	0	3 (Note: 2 appearances in Football League Trophy, 1 appearance in League Two play-offs)	0	42	0
Tranmere Rovers (loan)	2009–10	League One	37	0	5	0	2	0	1 (Note: Appearance(s) in Football League Trophy)	0	45	0
Charlton Athletic (loan)	2010–11	League One	0	0	—		0	0	0	0	0	0
Rochdale (loan)	2010–11	League One	1	0	—		—		—		1	0
Bristol Rovers (loan)	2010–11	League One	9	0	—		—		—		9	0
Southend United (loan)	2011–12	League Two	9	0	4	0	—		2	0	15	0
Scunthorpe United	2014–15	League One	23	0	—		—		—		23	0
Scunthorpe United	2015–16	League One	39	0	4	0	0	0	1	0	44	0
Scunthorpe United	2016–17	League One	39	0	1	0	2	0	0	0	42	0
Scunthorpe United	Total		101	0	5	0	2	0	1	0	109	0
Brentford	2017–18	Championship	1	0	1	0	3	0	—		5	0
Brentford	2018–19	Championship	12	0	4	0	3	0	—		19	0
Brentford	2019–20	Championship	0	0	2	0	1	0	0	0	3	0
Brentford	2020–21	Championship	4	0	2	0	3	0	0	0	9	0
Brentford	Total		17	0	9	0	10	0	0	0	36	0
Middlesbrough	2021–22	Championship	12	0	0	0	0	0	—		12	0
Middlesbrough	2022–23	Championship	0	0	0	0	0	0	0	0	0	0
Middlesbrough	Total		12	0	0	0	0	0	0	0	36	0
Forest Green Rovers	2023–24	League Two	19	0	1	0	0	0	0	0	20	0
Barrow	2024–25	League Two	0	0	0	0	0	0	0	0	0	0
Career total			246	0	24	0	17	0	7	0	294	0

== Honours ==
Brentford

- EFL Championship play-offs: 2021

Individual

- EFL Cup Team of the Tournament: 2020–21
