= 2021 EFL Championship play-off final =

Association football match in London

- Wembley Stadium in London hosted the final.
Brentford	Swansea City
2	0
- Date: 29 May 2021
- Venue: Wembley Stadium, London
- Man of the Match: Emiliano Marcondes (Brentford)
- Referee: Chris Kavanagh
- Attendance: 11,689

The 2021 EFL Championship play-off final was an association football match which was played on 29 May 2021 at Wembley Stadium, London, to determine the third and final team to gain promotion from the EFL Championship, the second tier of English football, to the Premier League. The top two teams of the 2020–21 EFL Championship, Norwich City and Watford, gained automatic promotion to the Premier League, while the clubs placed from third to sixth in the table took part in 2021 EFL play-offs. Brentford and Swansea City competed for the final place for the 2021–22 season in the Premier League.

This was Brentford's second consecutive play-off final after losing in extra-time to West London derby rivals Fulham in the 2020 EFL Championship play-off final on 4 August 2020. Chris Kavanagh was the referee for the match, played in front of 11,689 spectators. First-half goals from Ivan Toney and Emiliano Marcondes secured a 2–0 victory for Brentford while Swansea's Jay Fulton was sent off midway through the second half for a foul on Mathias Jensen. Brentford's victory meant they had been promoted via the English Football League play-offs for the first time in ten attempts. Winning the final and promotion was estimated in the media to be worth £178 million.

== Route to the final ==
EFL Championship final table, leading positions
Pos	Team	Pld	W	D	L	GF	GA	GD	Pts
1	Norwich City	46	29	10	7	75	36	+39	97
2	Watford	46	27	10	9	63	30	+33	91
3	Brentford	46	24	15	7	79	42	+37	87
4	Swansea City	46	23	11	12	56	39	+17	80
5	Barnsley	46	23	9	14	58	50	+8	78
6	Bournemouth	46	22	11	13	73	46	+27	77

Brentford finished the regular 2020–21 season in third place – for the second successive season – in the EFL Championship, the second tier of the English football league system, one place and seven points ahead of Swansea City. They therefore missed out on the two automatic places for promotion to the Premier League and instead took part in the play-offs to determine the third and final promoted team. They finished 4 points behind Watford (who were promoted in second place) and 10 behind league winners Norwich City. They had gone seven games unbeaten towards the end of the season, starting with a 5–0 away win against Preston North End on 10 April and ending with a final-day 3–1 home victory against Bristol City on 8 May 2021.

In their play-off semi-final, Brentford faced Bournemouth with the first match of the two-legged tie played at the Vitality Stadium in Boscombe on 17 May 2021 in front of 2,000 Bournemouth fans as part of the pilot scheme to get fans back into stadiums after the recent lockdown due to the COVID-19 pandemic in England. After a goalless first half, Arnaut Danjuma scored on the counter-attack in the 55th minute from a through ball from David Brooks. It was the game's only goal as Bournemouth won 1–0. The second leg of the semi-final was played five days later at the Brentford Community Stadium – the first play-off semi-final to be played at the stadium – in front of 4,000 Brentford fans. Danjuma increased Bournemouth's aggregate lead in the first five minutes. However, Brentford were awarded a penalty 11 minutes later, after a handball from Lloyd Kelly, which Ivan Toney scored. Twelve minutes later Bournemouth were reduced to ten players when Chris Mepham was sent off for a professional foul on Bryan Mbeumo. The first half ended 1–1. Five minutes after the interval, Vitaly Janelt scored for Brentford to make it 2–1 to Brentford on the day and 2–2 on aggregate. With nine minutes of the match remaining, Marcus Forss scored for Brentford to make it 3–1 to them on the day. Brentford qualified for the final 3–2 on aggregate.

Swansea City's opposition for their semi-final were Barnsley and the first leg was held at the Oakwell in Barnsley on 17 May 2021 in front of an attendance of 4,000 supporters. André Ayew opened the scoring in the 39th minute with a curling left-footed shot past Bradley Collins in the Barnsley goal. Carlton Morris hit Swansea City's crossbar in second-half injury time but the match ended 1–0. The second leg was played five days later at the Liberty Stadium in Swansea. Matt Grimes extended the home side's aggregate lead six minutes before half-time with a curling strike. In the 71st minute, Cauley Woodrow scored for Barnsley from the edge of the Swansea penalty area, and with no further scoring, the match ended 1–1 with Swansea City progressing to the final with a 2–1 aggregate victory.

== Match ==
=== Background ===
This was Swansea's second Championship play-off final, having won the 2011 Football League Championship play-off final 4–2 against Reading. They also lost in the third-tier final in 2006 on penalties to Barnsley at the Millennium Stadium in Cardiff. They had played in the Championship since being relegated from the Premier League in the 2017–18 season, and had lost in the previous season's play-offs at the semi-final stage, losing 3–2 on aggregate to Brentford. Brentford had failed to win in four play-off final attempts: they lost the 1997 Football League Second Division play-off final 1–0 against Crewe Alexandra, were defeated 2–0 in the 2002 Football League Second Division play-off final by Stoke City, lost to Yeovil Town in the 2013 Football League One play-off final 2–1 and were beaten in extra-time by West London derby rivals Fulham in the 2020 EFL Championship play-off final. They had also lost in five play-off semi-finals. Brentford had not played in the top flight of English football for 74 years, having been relegated to the second tier in their 1946–47 season.

Brentford's Ivan Toney was the Championship's top scorer during the regular season with 32 goals while Ayew was Swansea City's leading scorer with 17 goals, followed by Jamal Lowe on 14. Both matches between the sides during the regular season ended as 1–1 draws, the first at the Brentford Community Stadium in November 2020 and the second at the Liberty Stadium the following January.

Due to COVID-19 restrictions, the capacity was originally limited to 10,000. Following an appeal to the UK government and to footballing authorities, the capacity was raised to 12,000, the two clubs distributing 10,000 tickets between themselves. Winning the final and promotion was estimated by the BBC to be worth £178 million to the successful team.

=== Summary ===
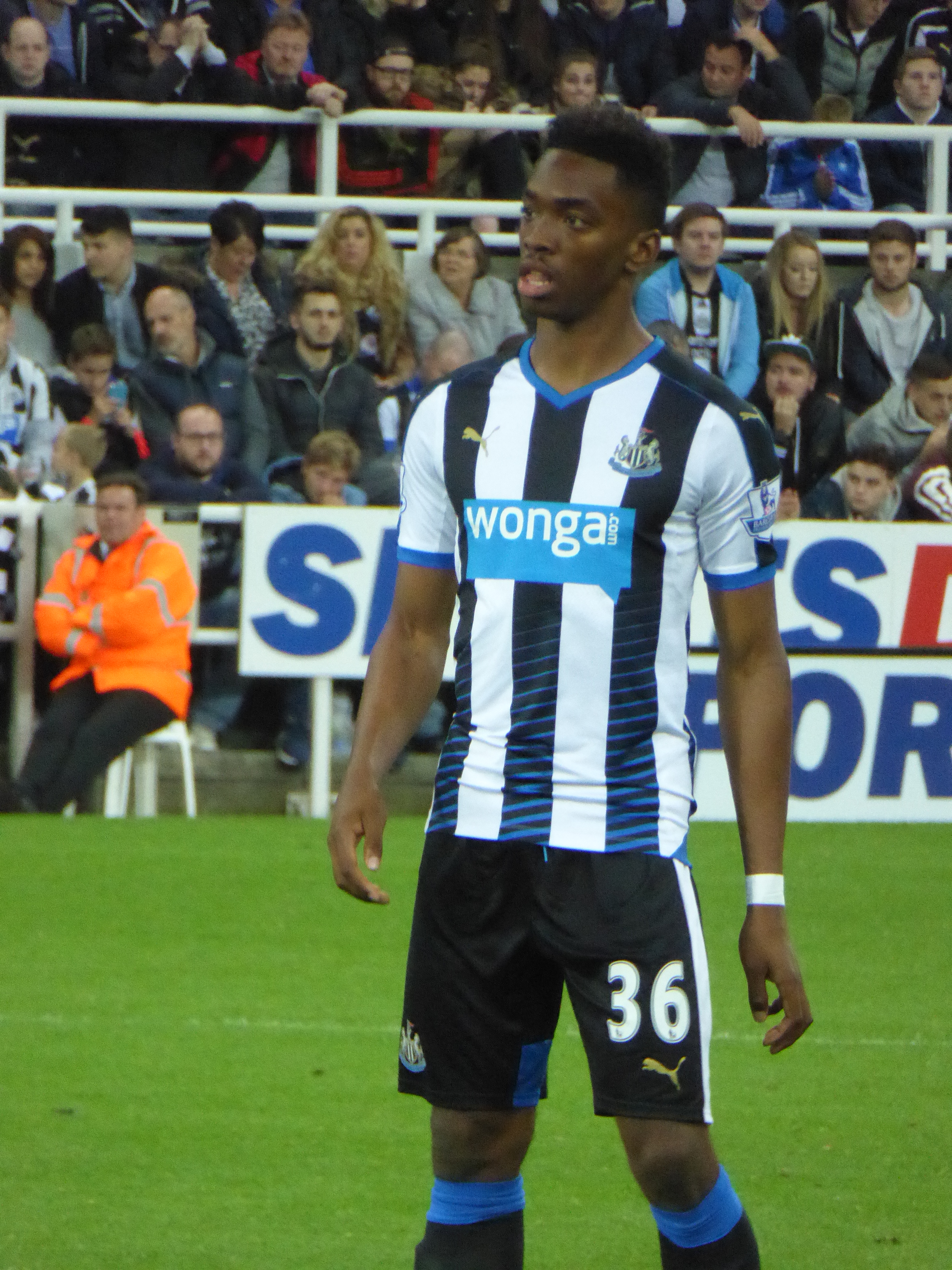
Ivan Toney (pictured in 2015) scored Brentford's first goal from the penalty spot.

Swansea City kicked off the final around 3 p.m. on 29 May 2021 in front of 11,689 spectators. Five minutes into the match, Brentford's Emiliano Marcondes struck a shot from distance but it was off-target, and a minute later Swansea's Matt Grimes was shown the first yellow card of the game after a foul on Sergi Canós. In the tenth minute, Bryan Mbeumo was fouled in the Swansea penalty area by goalkeeper Freddie Woodman and was awarded a penalty which Toney converted to give Brentford the lead. Brentford dominated the early stages of the half after going ahead and doubled their lead in the 20th minute through Marcondes: Brentford went on the counter-attack, Mbeumo passed to Mads Roerslev whose cross was finished by Marcondes. A minute later, Toney's volley from around 20 yards (18 m) struck the Swansea crossbar, bouncing off the ground just in front of the goalline. Swansea won two quick corners, and although they began to dominate possession, they failed to score. With three minutes of the half remaining, a poor back-header from Swansea's Marc Guéhi fell to Mbeumo but he lost his footings as he swivelled to shoot. In the 45th minute, Ayew's header from Conor Hourihane's free kick clipped the top of the Brentford bar, and after two minutes of stoppage time, the half was ended with Brentford leading 2–0.

Neither side made any changes to personnel during the interval and Brentford kicked off the second half. After three minutes, Swansea's Connor Roberts played in a cross which Ayew failed to head on target. Jamal Lowe's long-range shot then went high and wide of the Brentford goal. In the 58th minute, Mbeumo's shot went over Swansea's crossbar before Lowe's strike from inside the Brentford penalty area was wide of the target. With 29 minutes remaining, Swansea made their first substitution of the match, with striker Liam Cullen coming on to replace defender Kyle Naughton. Two minutes later Mbeumo's cross was struck goal-bound by Ethan Pinnock but the ball deflected away off his teammate Pontus Jansson. Midway through the second half, Swansea made their second substitution, with Hourihane being replaced by Yan Dhanda and within a minute they were reduced to ten men as Jay Fulton was shown a red card for a foul from behind on Mathias Jensen. In the 70th minute, Vitaly Janelt was booked for a foul on Roberts before a long-range free kick from Marcondes went over the Swansea crossbar. Brentford then made a double-substitution: Saman Ghoddos and Marcus Forss came on to replace Janelt and Canós, and then with ten minutes remaining, Winston Reid came on for an injured Jansson. Toney's 82nd minute strike was straight at Swansea defender Jake Bidwell, the latter being soon after replaced by Ryan Manning. Two minutes into stoppage time, Marcondes was substituted for Mads Bidstrup. Four minutes later, the final whistle was blown and Brentford were promoted for the first time in ten play-off appearances.

=== Details ===
29 May 2021
15:00 BST

Brentford	2–0	Swansea City
Toney 10' (pen.); Marcondes 20'	Report

Wembley Stadium, London
Attendance: 11,689
Referee: Chris Kavanagh

Brentford	Swansea City

GK	1	(Spain) David Raya
CB	22	(Denmark) Henrik Dalsgaard
CB	18	(Sweden) Pontus Jansson (c)		(substituted off) 79'
CB	5	(Jamaica) Ethan Pinnock
RM	30	(Denmark) Mads Roerslev
CM	8	(Denmark) Mathias Jensen
CM	27	(Germany) Vitaly Janelt	(yellow card) 70'	(substituted off) 74'
LM	7	(Spain) Sergi Canós		(substituted off) 74'
AM	9	(Denmark) Emiliano Marcondes	(yellow card) 22'	(substituted off) 90+2'
CF	17	(England) Ivan Toney
CF	19	(France) Bryan Mbeumo
Substitutes:
GK	28	(England) Luke Daniels
DF	4	(England) Charlie Goode
DF	23	(New Zealand) Winston Reid		(substituted on) 79'
DF	36	(Wales) Fin Stevens
MF	6	(Denmark) Christian Nørgaard
MF	20	(Iran) Saman Ghoddos		(substituted on) 74'
MF	24	(Ghana) Tariqe Fosu
MF	41	(Denmark) Mads Bidstrup		(substituted on) 90+2'
FW	15	(Finland) Marcus Forss		(substituted on) 74'
Head Coach:
(Denmark) Thomas Frank

GK	1	(England) Freddie Woodman
CB	26	(England) Kyle Naughton		(substituted off) 60'
CB	44	(Wales) Ben Cabango
CB	5	(England) Marc Guéhi
DM	8	(England) Matt Grimes (c)	(yellow card) 6'
RM	23	(Wales) Connor Roberts
CM	6	(Scotland) Jay Fulton	(red card) 65'
CM	14	(Republic of Ireland) Conor Hourihane		(substituted off) 63'
LM	24	(England) Jake Bidwell		(substituted off) 83'
CF	10	(Ghana) André Ayew
CF	9	(Jamaica) Jamal Lowe
Substitutes:
GK	18	(England) Ben Hamer
DF	2	(England) Ryan Bennett
DF	3	(Republic of Ireland) Ryan Manning		(substituted on) 83'
DF	22	(England) Joel Latibeaudiere
DF	34	(Wales) Kieron Freeman
MF	7	(England) Korey Smith
MF	21	(England) Yan Dhanda		(substituted on) 63'
FW	17	(England) Morgan Whittaker
FW	20	(Wales) Liam Cullen		(substituted on) 60'
Head Coach:
(Wales) Steve Cooper

Man of the Match:
Emiliano Marcondes (Brentford)

Statistics
	Brentford	Swansea City
Possession	43%	57%
Goals scored	2	0
Shots on target	3	0
Shots off target	5	7
Fouls committed	16	13
Corner kicks	4	3
Yellow cards	2	1
Red cards	0	1

== Post-match ==
Thomas Frank became the first Danish head coach to achieve promotion to the Premier League. He remarked "I'm completely empty right now. I don't know if I can describe it. It's been such a long journey ... Somebody said to me that we need two hands and 10 fingers to lift the trophy and we have done it on our 10th attempt." Brentford defender Jansson said "It's been a hard year but we're finally there ... I could go home to Sweden and retire now as this is what I have dreamed of. I won't though!" Losing head coach Steve Cooper was disappointed in his side's performance, noting "We started the game second best and some defining moments didn't go our way. We gave ourselves a really tough job going 2–0 down."

Brentford ended the following season in 13th position in the Premier League. Swansea City's next season concluded with them in 15th place in the EFL Championship.
