= David Raya =

Spanish footballer (born 1995)

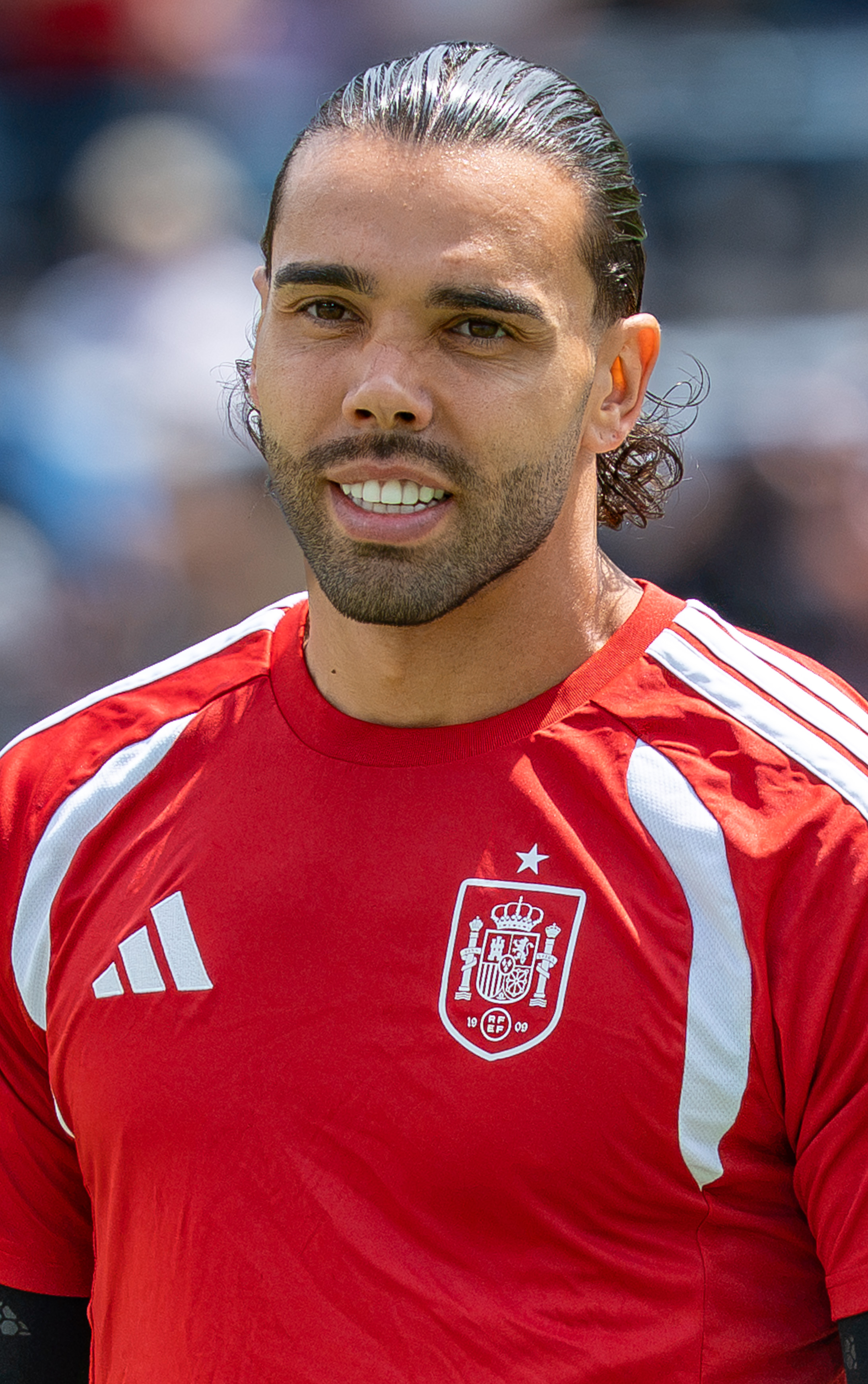
- Raya with Spain in 2026

Personal information
- Full name: David Raya Martín
- Date of birth: 15 September 1995 (age 31)
- Place of birth: Barcelona, Spain
- Height: 1.83 m (6 ft 0 in)
- Position: Goalkeeper

Team information
- Current team: Arsenal
- Number: 1

Youth career
- Cornellà
- 2012–2014: Blackburn Rovers

Senior career*
Years	Team	Apps	(Gls)
2014–2019	Blackburn Rovers	98	(0)
2014–2015	→ Southport (loan)	16	(0)
2019–2024	Brentford	150	(0)
2023–2024	→ Arsenal (loan)	32	(0)
2024–	Arsenal	86	(0)

International career^{‡}
2022–	Spain	14	(0)
Medal record
Men's football
Representing Spain
FIFA World Cup
Winner	2026 Canada–Mexico–US
UEFA European Championship
Winner	2024 Germany
UEFA Nations League
Winner	2023 Netherlands
Runner-up	2025 Germany
- * Club domestic league appearances and goals as of 19:28, 21 November 2026 (UTC) ‡ National team caps and goals as of 20:40, 3 October 2026 (UTC)

David Raya Martín (born 15 September 1995) is a Spanish professional footballer who plays as a goalkeeper for Premier League club Arsenal and the Spain national team. Known for his consistency, distribution, shot-stopping abilities, and box command, he is widely regarded as one of the best goalkeepers in the world.

Raya began his senior career in England with Blackburn Rovers. He made his professional breakthrough as part of the team that was promoted from League One in 2018. He transferred to Championship club Brentford in 2019 and was a part of the team that was promoted to the Premier League in 2021. In 2023, Raya joined Arsenal, and has since gone on to win three consecutive Premier League Golden Gloves and his first Premier League title in 2026.

Raya made his international debut for Spain in 2022, and was part of their squads at the 2022 FIFA World Cup, UEFA Euro 2024 and the 2026 World Cup, winning the 2024 and 2026 tournaments.

== Club career ==
=== Blackburn Rovers ===
Born in Barcelona, Catalonia, Raya began his career in his native Spain and combined goalkeeping with playing as an outfield player in futsal. He later played youth football for Cornellà, before moving to England to join Blackburn Rovers on a scholarship in July 2012, aged 16. Two years earlier, the transfer of Hugo Fernández to Ewood Park had led to an agreement between the two clubs for Cornellà players to join Blackburn Rovers for trials. He progressed through the club's academy and signed a professional contract on 26 February 2014. Raya gained his first senior experience with a four-month spell on loan at Conference Premier club Southport during the first half of the 2014–15 season and made 24 appearances. After his return to Ewood Park, he made two late-season Championship appearances and signed a new three-year contract in April 2015.

Despite making just 13 appearances during the 2015–16 and 2016–17 seasons, Raya was Rovers' second-choice goalkeeper behind Jason Steele and was a frequent member of the matchday squad. Rovers' relegation to League One at the end of the 2016–17 season saw Raya take over as the club's first-choice goalkeeper. He made 47 appearances during the 2017–18 season and helped the club to automatic promotion straight back to the Championship. He retained his place during 2018–19 and made 46 appearances during a season of consolidation in the Championship. In the 2018–19 season, whilst playing against West Bromwich Albion F.C., Raya was involved in an aerial collision with West Bromwich striker Jay Rodriguez. The collision resulted in Raya being stretchered off the pitch and needing subsequent nose reconstruction surgery. Raya departed Rovers in July 2019, after making 108 appearances for the club.

=== Brentford ===
On 6 July 2019, Raya signed for Championship club Brentford on a four-year contract for an undisclosed fee, reported to be in the region of £3 million. Raya's performances during the first half of the 2019–20 season earned him a nomination for Goalkeeper of the Year at the 2020 London Football Awards and his 16 clean sheets in league matches during the season saw him share the EFL Golden Glove award with Bartosz Białkowski. Raya made 49 appearances during a season which ended with a 2–1 2020 Championship play-off final defeat to West London rivals Fulham.

Injury and transfer speculation led to Raya being left out of head coach Thomas Frank's matchday squads during the 2020–21 pre-season and early in the regular season. After being reintegrated with two EFL Cup appearances and captaining the team in both matches, he signed a new four-year contract on 2 October 2020. Raya finished the 2020–21 season with 48 appearances, 17 clean sheets and a promotion medal, earned with a 2–0 2021 Championship play-off final victory over Swansea City. In his growing role as a sweeper-keeper, Raya attempted 300 more passes than any other Championship goalkeeper during the season.

Raya began the 2021–22 season as a starter in Premier League matches, before suffering a posterior cruciate ligament injury during a 2–1 defeat to Leicester City on 24 October 2021. He returned to outdoor training on 10 January 2022. After an appearance in a behind-closed-doors friendly on 1 February 2022, Raya made his return to competitive match play with a start in a 4–1 FA Cup fourth round defeat to Everton four days later. He was ever-present until the end of the campaign and finished a mid-table season with 25 appearances.

Raya continued as a starter in league matches during the 2022–23 season and his performances during an unbeaten January 2023 (during which Brentford challenged the European places) saw him nominated for the Premier League Player of the Month award. That same month, Raya rejected a second offer of a new contract. He was a member of the club's leadership group during the 2022–23 season. According to Opta Sports, Raya led all goalkeepers for both saves (154) and save percentage (77%) in the 2022–23 Premier League, becoming the only goalkeeper to top both categories in a single campaign in the competition since stats started being tracked in 2003–04.

=== Arsenal ===
==== 2023–24 season ====
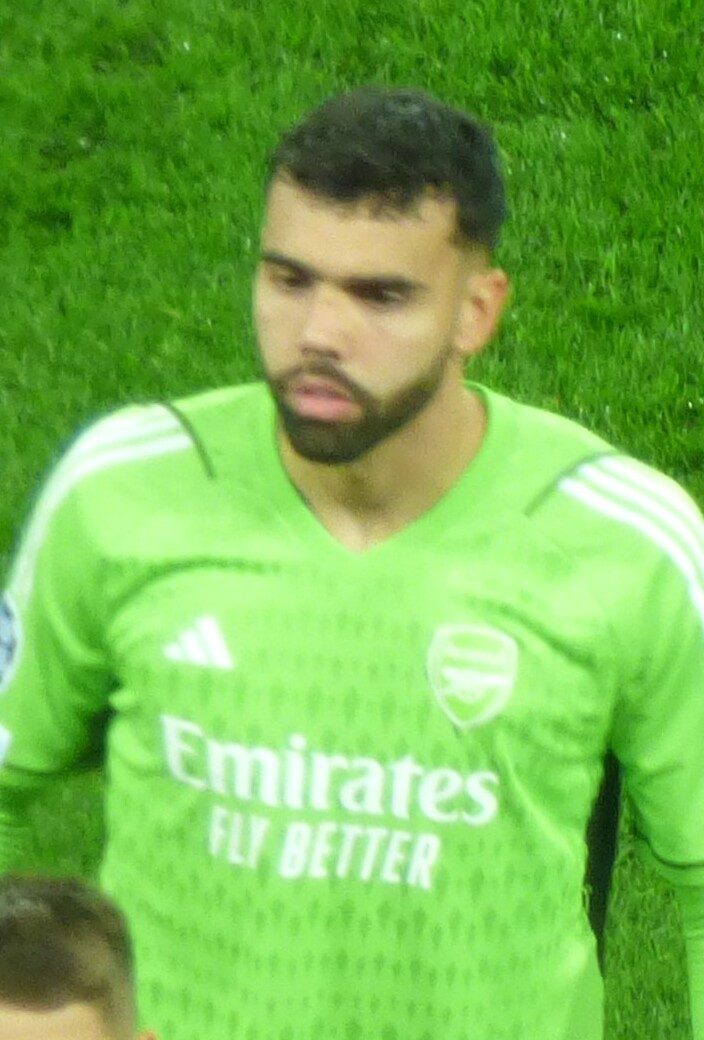
Raya with Arsenal in 2023

On 15 August 2023, Raya completed a season-long loan move to Arsenal, becoming the fifteenth player from Spain to represent Arsenal's first team. Arsenal paid £3 million to complete the loan deal, which had a purchase option of £27 million. Before joining Arsenal on loan, Raya signed a new two-year contract with Brentford, with a club option for an additional 12 months. On 17 September, he made his debut as a starter for Arsenal against Everton at Goodison Park, replacing Aaron Ramsdale as Arsenal's starting goalkeeper. Raya would later make his Arsenal home and Champions League debut against PSV Eindhoven on 20 September, keeping a clean sheet as the Gunners ran out 4–0 winners.

On 24 September, Raya started in the first North London derby of the season against Tottenham Hotspur and had a mixed performance. Discussing Raya's replacement of Ramsdale as Arsenal's starting goalkeeper, BBC journalist Phil McNulty stated in November 2023 that manager Mikel Arteta had to "face inevitable scrutiny about whether he has also reduced Arsenal's effectiveness and fluency by applying a fix to something that was not broken." On 12 March 2024, Raya saved two penalties in a penalty shootout win against Porto in the Champions League round of 16, helping Arsenal reach the quarter-finals for the first time since 2010, which McNulty stated "settled all lingering arguments about his status as Arsenal's first-choice goalkeeper".

On 20 April, Raya kept a sixth consecutive away clean sheet in the Premier League, becoming the second goalkeeper in the competition's history to achieve this feat, after Edwin van der Sar did so in 2008–2009. On 4 May, he was confirmed as the outright winner of the 2023–24 Premier League Golden Glove, having kept the most clean sheets (16) of any goalkeeper in the season. Raya became the third Arsenal goalkeeper to win the award, after Wojciech Szczęsny and Petr Čech, and the third Spaniard to win the award, after Pepe Reina and David de Gea. Raya was later included in the PFA Premier League Team of the Year for the season.

==== 2024–25 season ====
On 4 July, he completed his permanent move to Arsenal by signing a long-term contract. In the game against Aston Villa on 24 August, he made a one-handed stop to keep out Ollie Watkins's close-range header, which was named that month's Premier League Save of the Month.

On 19 September, he saved a penalty against Italian side Atalanta taken by Mateo Retegui and the rebound header, becoming the fourth Arsenal goalkeeper to save a penalty in the Champions League, after Richard Wright, Jens Lehmann and Łukasz Fabiański. In his post-match interview, Raya credited Arsenal's goalkeeping coach Iñaki Caña for the role he played in his double save against Atalanta. He was later voted as Arsenal's Player of the Month for September. On 27 December, Raya claimed a clean sheet against Ipswich Town, his 23rd clean sheet in 50 Premier League games for Arsenal. In doing so, Raya broke David Seaman's record (22) set in 1993 for the most clean sheets kept by an Arsenal goalkeeper in his first 50 Premier League appearances. Raya went on to secure his second consecutive Premier League Golden Glove, sharing the award with Nottingham Forest goalkeeper Matz Sels, after both kept 13 clean sheets.

==== 2025–26 season ====
On 13 September 2025, Raya made his 100th appearance for Arsenal in a 3–0 home win against Nottingham Forest, also recording his 42nd clean sheet for the club. Later that year, on 4 November, Raya recorded a joint club-record eighth consecutive clean sheet and his 50th clean sheet overall in his 110th appearance for Arsenal during a 3–0 away victory over Slavia Prague, surpassing the mark previously set by Jimmy Ashcroft, who reached the milestone in 114 matches in 1903.

On 4 May 2026, after his only challenger Gianluigi Donnarumma conceded against Everton, Raya was confirmed as at least a partial (later outright) winner of the 2025–26 Premier League Golden Glove, becoming only the fourth ever goalkeeper to win the award in three successive seasons, after Pepe Reina (Liverpool), Joe Hart (Man City) and Ederson (Man City). A day later, he kept his ninth clean sheet in the Champions League in a 1–0 victory over Atlético Madrid in the semi-final second leg, equalling the competition's record set by Sebastiano Rossi, Santiago Cañizares, Keylor Navas and Édouard Mendy. A few weeks later, on 18 May, he recorded his 19th league clean sheet in a 1–0 victory over Burnley, equalling the club record set by David Seaman in the 1993–94 and 1998–99 seasons.

==== 2026-27 season ====
Raya began the season as the first-choice goalkeeper for the defending champions, Arsenal. 11 matches into the season, he kept 7 clean sheets in the Premier League. On the 21st of November, 2026, Raya was subbed off in an away match against Newcastle United as he got an injury. The match ended in a 2-2 draw. He was also named as the Goalkeeper of the Year in the FIFPRO World 11.

== International career ==
Raya with Spain after winning the 2026 FIFA World Cup Final

After failing to receive a call-up by Spain at youth level, Raya won his maiden international call-up to the senior team for a pair of friendlies in March 2022. He made his debut with a start in a 2–1 win over Albania on 26 March, and remained an unused substitute in the second match. Raya was also an unused substitute during the entirety of Spain's victorious 2022–23 UEFA Nations League campaign.

Raya was named in Spain's 2022 FIFA World Cup squad, but prior to the team's exit in the round of 16, his only minutes during this period came with a second-half substitute appearance in a pre-tournament friendly against Jordan on 17 November.

Raya was part of the Spain squad that won UEFA Euro 2024. He played only one match, starting Spain's final group stage fixture against Albania, where he kept a clean sheet in a 1–0 victory.

On 25 May 2026, Raya was named in Spain’s squad for the 2026 World Cup. He was an unused substitute during the entirety of Spain's victorious campaign, again serving as the backup goalkeeper to first-choice Unai Simón.

== Style of play ==
A sweeper-keeper, Raya "is renowned as a vocal keeper, as well as one who is adept with the ball at his feet". He "can play out from the back and is happy covering the space in behind", which allows a team "to play with a high line". As a result of his and Brentford's style of play during the 2020–21 season, Raya attempted 300 more passes than any other goalkeeper in the Championship.

In an exclusive interview with Sky Sports on 14 August 2024, Raya credited former Brentford and current Arsenal goalkeeping coach Iñaki Caña – who was a key figure in Raya's transfer from Blackburn to Brentford in 2019 and his move from Brentford to Arsenal in 2023 – for transforming the way he played.

"At Blackburn, [I was] just waiting to make saves. When I signed for Brentford, Iñaki completely changed my style of being a goalkeeper, to be more proactive and anticipate stuff... [If] you can go for a cross, go for it. Don't [just] wait for the save. For balls in behind, stay high to be able to cut out the attack... At Brentford and [Arsenal], my numbers on crosses are remarkable. I love it. [Being an] extra player to get that security straight from the back. I love being part of the build-up [and] trying to create goals and attacks... The benefit is bigger than the risk."

— David Raya speaking to Sky Sports on 14 August 2024

== Personal life ==
Raya grew up in Pallejà. In July 2025, he married Tatiana Trouboul.

== Career statistics ==
=== Club ===
As of match played 4 November 2026

Appearances and goals by club, season and competition
Club	Season	League			FA Cup		EFL Cup		Europe		Other		Total	
Club	Season	Division	Apps	Goals	Apps	Goals	Apps	Goals	Apps	Goals	Apps	Goals	Apps	Goals
Blackburn Rovers	2014–15	Championship	2	0	—		0	0	—		—		2	0
Blackburn Rovers	2015–16	Championship	5	0	0	0	0	0	—		—		5	0
Blackburn Rovers	2016–17	Championship	5	0	1	0	2	0	—		—		8	0
Blackburn Rovers	2017–18	League One	45	0	0	0	2	0	—		0	0	47	0
Blackburn Rovers	2018–19	Championship	41	0	2	0	3	0	—		—		46	0
Blackburn Rovers	Total		98	0	3	0	7	0	—		0	0	108	0
Blackburn Rovers U23	2016–17	—			—		—		—		3 (Note: Appearances in EFL Trophy)	0	3	0
Southport (loan)	2014–15	Conference Premier	16	0	6	0	—		—		2 (Note: Appearances in FA Trophy)	0	24	0
Brentford	2019–20	Championship	46	0	0	0	0	0	—		3 (Note: Appearances in Championship play-offs)	0	49	0
Brentford	2020–21	Championship	42	0	0	0	3	0	—		3	0	48	0
Brentford	2021–22	Premier League	24	0	1	0	0	0	—		—		25	0
Brentford	2022–23	Premier League	38	0	0	0	1	0	—		—		39	0
Brentford	Total		150	0	1	0	4	0	—		6	0	161	0
Arsenal (loan)	2023–24	Premier League	32	0	0	0	0	0	9 (Note: Appearances in UEFA Champions League)	0	0	0	41	0
Arsenal	2024–25	Premier League	38	0	1	0	3	0	13	0	—		55	0
Arsenal	2025–26	Premier League	37	0	0	0	0	0	14	0	—		51	0
Arsenal	2026–27	Premier League	9	0	0	0	0	0	4	0	1 (Note: Appearance in FA Community Shield)	0	14	0
Arsenal	Arsenal total		116	0	1	0	3	0	40	0	1	0	161	0
Career total			380	0	11	0	14	0	40	0	12	0	457	0

=== International ===
As of match played 3 October 2026

Appearances and goals by national team and year
National team	Year	Apps	Goals
Spain	2022	2	0
Spain	2023	1	0
Spain	2024	8	0
Spain	2025	0	0
Spain	2026	3	0
Total		14	0

== Honours ==
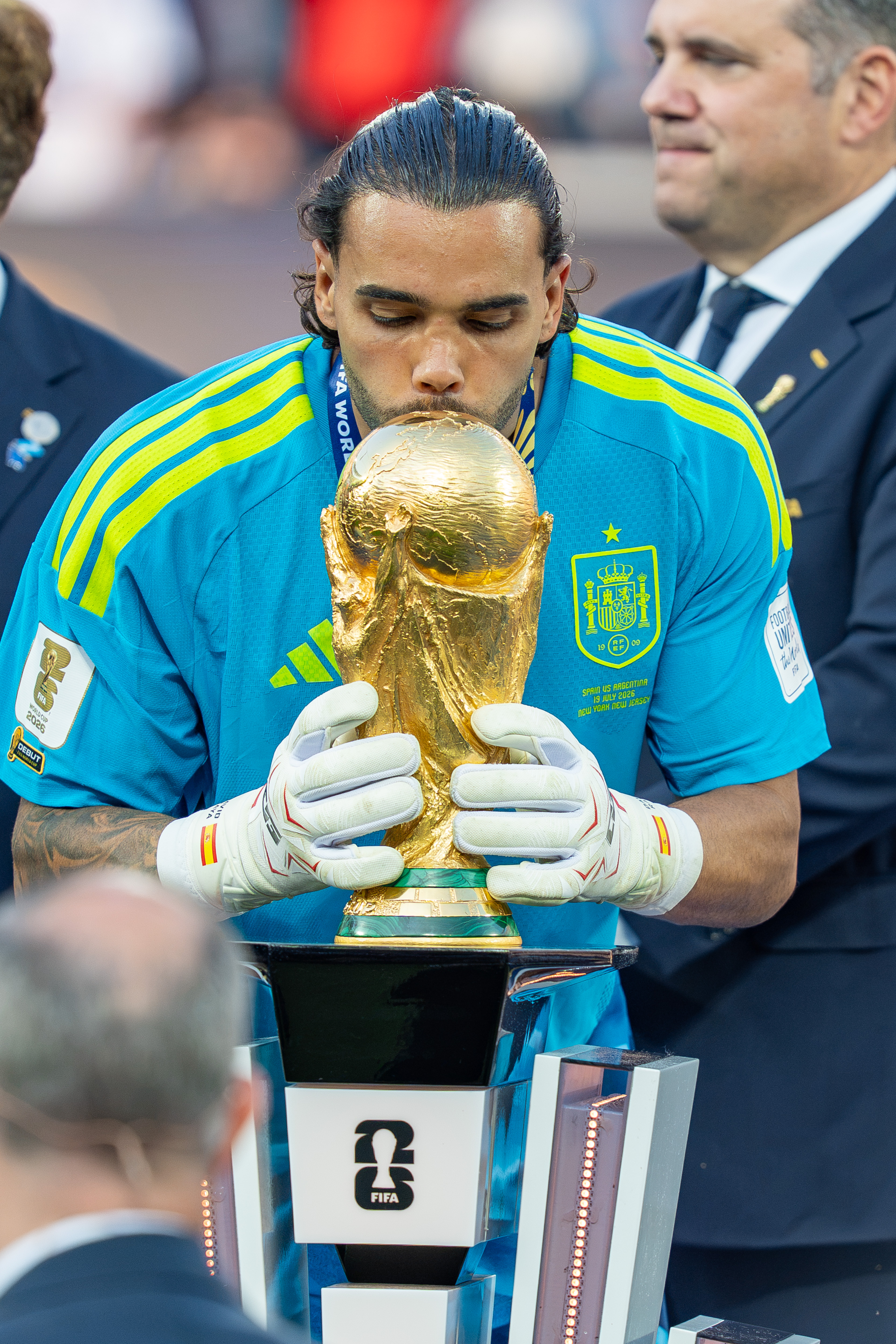
Raya with the FIFA World Cup Trophy in 2026

Blackburn Rovers

- EFL League One second-place promotion: 2017–18

Brentford

- EFL Championship play-offs: 2021

Arsenal

- Premier League: 2025–26
- FA Community Shield: 2026
- EFL Cup runner-up: 2025–26
- UEFA Champions League runner-up: 2025–26

Spain

- FIFA World Cup: 2026
- UEFA European Championship: 2024
- UEFA Nations League: 2022–23; runner-up: 2024–25

Individual

- EFL Championship Golden Glove: 2019–20
- Premier League Golden Glove: 2023–24, 2024–25 (shared), 2025–26
- Premier League Fan Team of the Season: 2023–24, 2025–26
- PFA Team of the Year: 2023–24 Premier League, 2025–26 Premier League
- Premier League Save of the Month: August 2024, March 2025, December 2025, September 2026
- UEFA Champions League Team of the Season: 2025–26
- FIFPRO Men's World 11: 2026
