= Premier League Golden Glove =

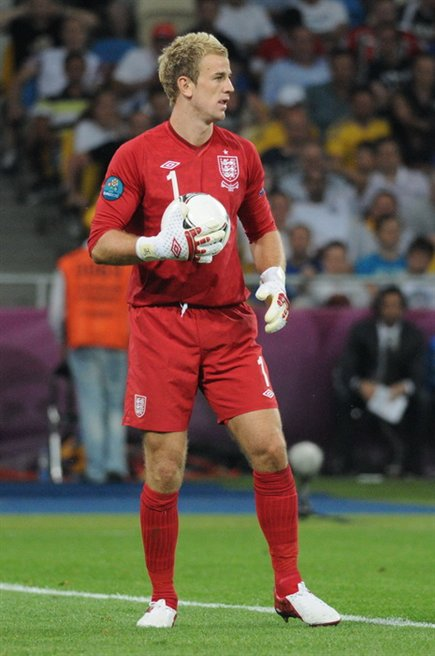
- Joe Hart is the joint highest winner of the Golden Glove award with four.
- Awarded for: The most clean sheets in a given Premier League season
- Sponsored by: Castrol
- Country: England
- Presented by: Premier League
- First award: 2005
- Currently held by: David Raya

Highlights
- Most awards: Petr Čech and Joe Hart (4)
- Most consecutive wins: 3 (Pepe Reina, Joe Hart, Ederson, David Raya)
- Most clean sheets: 24 (Petr Čech; 2004–05)
- Website: https://www.premierleague.com/awards?at=2&aw=22&se=-1

The Premier League Golden Glove is an annual association football award presented to the goalkeeper who has kept the most clean sheets in the Premier League. In football, a team's defence or goalkeeper may be said to "keep a clean sheet" if they prevent their opponents from scoring any goals during an entire match.

The Premier League was founded in 1992, when the clubs of the First Division left the Football League and established a new commercially independent league that negotiated its own broadcast and sponsorship agreements. Originally, the Golden Glove could only be won outright by a single player; should there have been a tie, the goalkeeper with the superior clean sheets-to-games ratio received the award. However, starting in the 2013–14 season, the Golden Glove is shared by goalkeepers with an equal number of clean sheets, regardless of the number of games they played.

In 2005, the inaugural Premier League Golden Glove was awarded to Petr Čech of Chelsea. Čech's 24 clean sheets in a single season remains the current record. Since 2005 Čech and Joe Hart have won the award on the most occasions with four successes each, with Čech the only goalkeeper to have won the award with two different teams (Chelsea and Arsenal). Pepe Reina was the first goalkeeper to achieve back-to-back wins of the award, managing to do so in three consecutive seasons between 2005 and 2008. Joe Hart later repeated the achievement with Manchester City between 2010 and 2013, as did Ederson with the same club between 2020 and 2022 and David Raya from 2024 to 2026.

During the 2008–09 season, Edwin van der Sar surpassed Čech's previous record of ten consecutive clean sheets by reaching 14. During his streak, Van der Sar went 1,311 minutes without conceding a goal. In the process, he broke both Čech's Premier League record (1,025 minutes), Steve Death's Football League record (1,103 minutes) and also the all-time league record in Britain (1,155 minutes) for most consecutive scoreless minutes.

== Winners ==
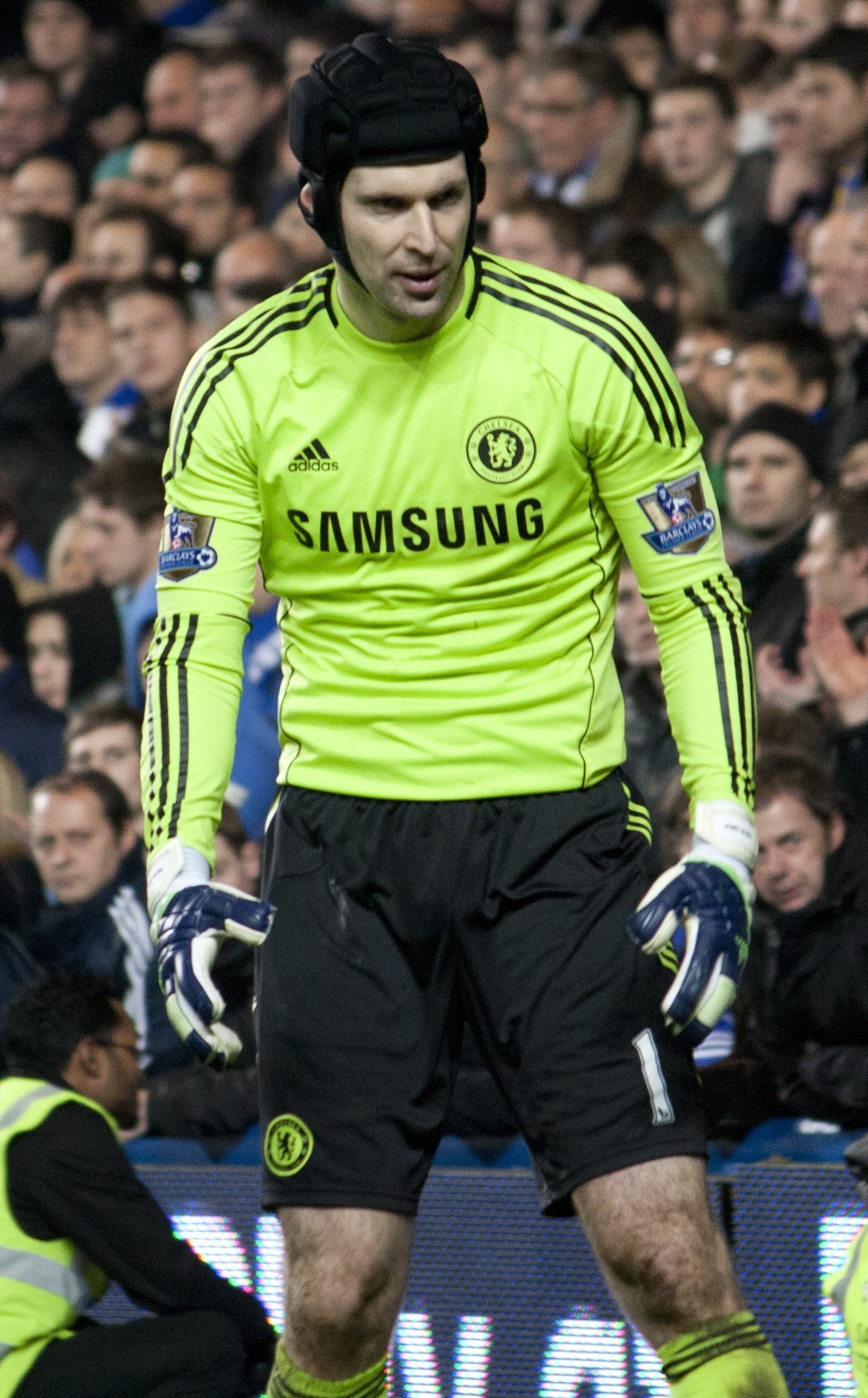
Petr Čech won the inaugural Premier League Golden Glove in 2005.

Key
Player (X)	Name of the player and number of times they had won the award at that point (for goalkeepers with more awards than one)
†	Indicates multiple award winners in the same season
‡	Denotes the club were Premier League champions in the same season
#	Premier League record

Premier League Golden Glove winners
Season	Player	Nationality	Club	Clean sheets	Ref(s)
2004–05	Petr Čech (1)	Czech Republic	Chelsea^{‡}	24^{#}	
2005–06	Pepe Reina (1)	Spain	Liverpool	20	
2006–07	Pepe Reina (2)	Spain	Liverpool	19	
2007–08	Pepe Reina (3)	Spain	Liverpool	18	
2008–09	Edwin van der Sar	Netherlands	Manchester United^{‡}	21	
2009–10	Petr Čech (2)	Czech Republic	Chelsea^{‡}	17	
2010–11	Joe Hart (1)	England	Manchester City	18	
2011–12	Joe Hart (2)	England	Manchester City^{‡}	17	
2012–13	Joe Hart (3)	England	Manchester City	18	
2013–14^{†}	Petr Čech (3)	Czech Republic	Chelsea	16	
2013–14^{†}	Wojciech Szczęsny	Poland	Arsenal	16	
2014–15	Joe Hart (4)	England	Manchester City	14	
2015–16	Petr Čech (4)	Czech Republic	Arsenal	16	
2016–17	Thibaut Courtois	Belgium	Chelsea^{‡}	16	
2017–18	David de Gea (1)	Spain	Manchester United	18	
2018–19	Alisson (1)	Brazil	Liverpool	21	
2019–20	Ederson (1)	Brazil	Manchester City	16	
2020–21	Ederson (2)	Brazil	Manchester City^{‡}	19	
2021–22^{†}	Alisson (2)	Brazil	Liverpool	20	
2021–22^{†}	Ederson (3)	Brazil	Manchester City^{‡}	20	
2022–23	David de Gea (2)	Spain	Manchester United	17	
2023–24	David Raya (1)	Spain	Arsenal	16	
2024–25^{†}	David Raya (2)	Spain	Arsenal	13	
2024–25^{†}	Matz Sels	Belgium	Nottingham Forest	13	
2025–26	David Raya (3)	Spain	Arsenal^{‡}	19	

== Multiple awards won by player ==
The following table lists the number of awards won by players who have won at least two Golden Glove awards.

Players in bold are still active in the Premier League.

Awards	Player	Country	Seasons
4	Petr Čech	Czech Republic	2004–05, 2009–10, 2013–14, 2015–16
4	Joe Hart	England	2010–11, 2011–12, 2012–13, 2014–15
3	Pepe Reina	Spain	2005–06, 2006–07, 2007–08
3	Ederson	Brazil	2019–20, 2020–21, 2021–22
3	**David Raya**	Spain	2023–24, 2024–25, 2025–26
2	**Alisson**	Brazil	2018–19, 2021–22
2	David de Gea	Spain	2017–18, 2022–23

== Awards won by nationality ==
Country	Players	Total
Spain	3	8
Brazil	2	5
Czech Republic	1	4
England	1	4
Belgium	2	2
Netherlands	1	1
Poland	1	1

== Awards won by club ==
Club	Players	Total
Manchester City	2	7
Liverpool	2	5
Arsenal	3	5
Chelsea	2	4
Manchester United	2	3
Nottingham Forest	1	1

== See also ==
- Premier League Save of the Season
- Premier League Save of the Month
