= Alisson Becker =

Brazilian footballer (born 1992)

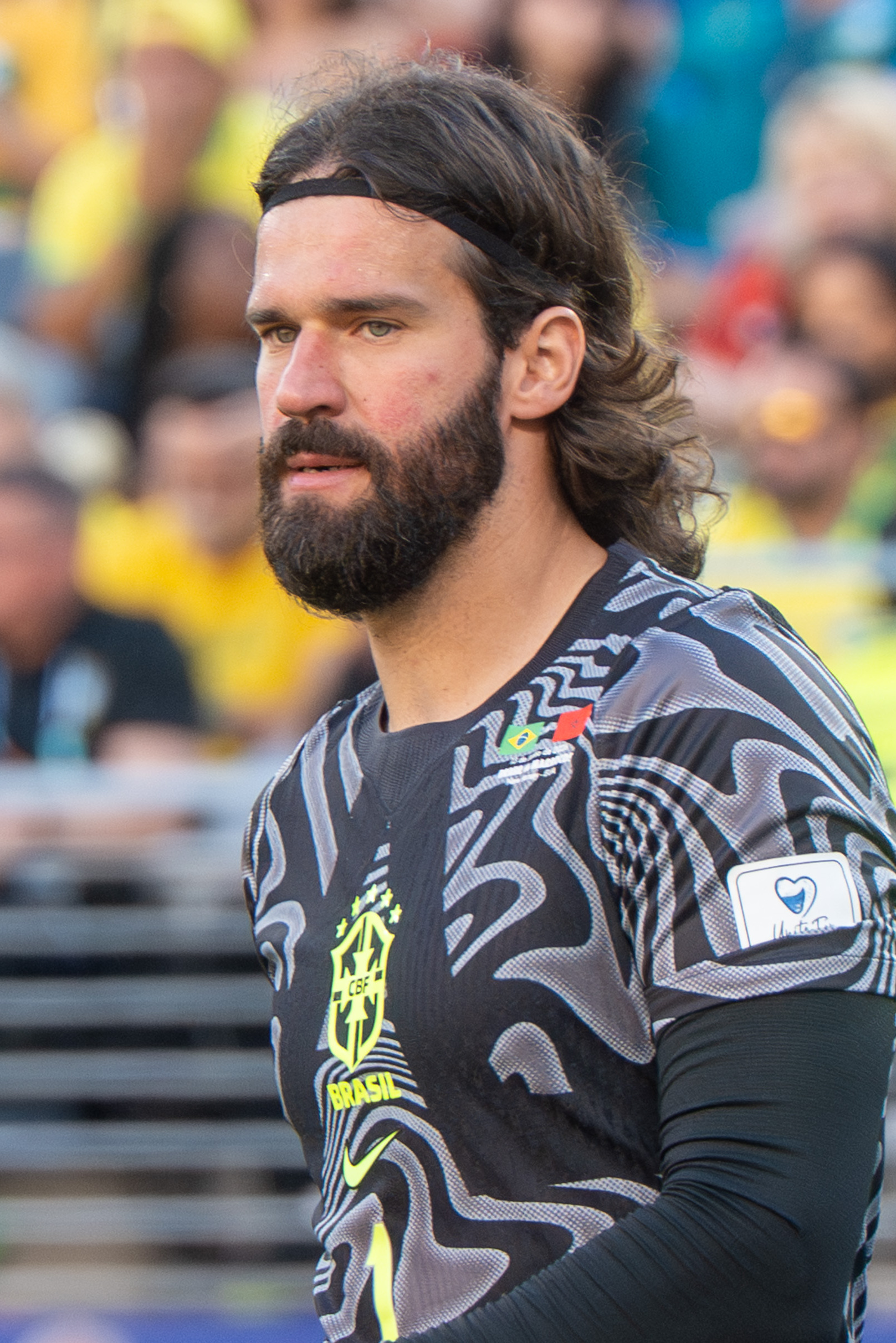
- Alisson with Brazil in 2026

Personal information
- Full name: Alisson Ramsés Becker
- Date of birth: 2 October 1992 (age 34)
- Place of birth: Novo Hamburgo, Rio Grande do Sul, Brazil
- Height: 1.93 m (6 ft 4 in)
- Position: Goalkeeper

Team information
- Current team: Liverpool
- Number: 1

Youth career
- 2002–2013: Internacional

Senior career*
Years	Team	Apps	(Gls)
2013–2016	Internacional	80	(0)
2016–2018	Roma	37	(0)
2018–	Liverpool	266	(1)

International career^{‡}
2009	Brazil U17	3	(0)
2013	Brazil U20	5	(0)
2015–	Brazil	83	(0)
Medal record
Men's football
Representing Brazil
Copa América
Winner	2019 Brazil
Runner-up	2021 Brazil
- * Club domestic league appearances and goals as of 22 November 2026 (UTC) ‡ National team caps and goals as of 5 July 2026 (UTC)

Álisson Ramsés Becker (Note: Brazilian Portuguese pronunciation: [ˈalisõw̃ ˈbɛkeʁ]) (born 2 October 1992), also known mononymously as Alisson, is a Brazilian professional footballer who plays as a goalkeeper for Premier League club Liverpool and the Brazil national team. He is widely regarded as one of the best goalkeepers in the world.

Alisson joined Internacional's academy in 2002, progressing through the youth set up before making his senior debut in 2013. During his four years with Internacional's senior side, Alisson won the Campeonato Gaúcho title in each season. He signed for Roma in July 2016 and was awarded Serie A Goalkeeper of the Year in 2017–18. In July 2018, Liverpool signed Alisson for a fee of £66.8 million (€72.5 million), the most expensive goalkeeper transfer at that time. At Liverpool, Alisson has won the Premier League, FA Cup, EFL Cup, UEFA Champions League and FIFA Club World Cup. In 2019, he was named The Best FIFA Goalkeeper and was also the recipient of the inaugural Yashin Trophy. Alisson has twice been selected in the FIFA FIFPRO Men's World 11.

Alisson represented Brazil at various youth levels before making his senior international debut in 2015. He represented the nation at the FIFA World Cup in 2018, 2022 and 2026, and the Copa América in 2016, 2019, 2021 and 2024, winning the 2019 edition of the tournament while also being named its best goalkeeper.

== Club career ==
=== Internacional ===
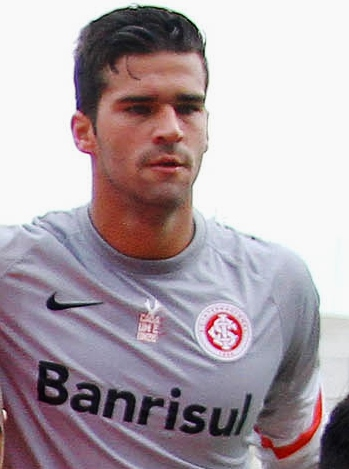
Alisson with Internacional in 2015

Born in Novo Hamburgo, Rio Grande do Sul, Alisson joined Internacional's academy in 2002, aged ten. Having progressed through the youth set up, he featured regularly with the under-23 side, before making his senior debut on 17 February 2013, starting in a 1–1 away draw against Cruzeiro-RS in the Campeonato Gaúcho championship. His Série A debut followed on 25 August 2013 when he started in a 3–3 home draw against Goiás. A backup to his brother Muriel and competing for second-choice with Agenor, he finished his first season with six appearances.

The following year, Alisson found himself competing with Brazilian legend Dida, who had joined Internacional from Grêmio. He earned a starting berth in October and finished the year with 11 league appearances to his name. He was an undisputed starter in the following year during which he amassed 57 appearances across all competitions. On 4 February 2016, Alisson signed a pre-contract with Italian club Roma, signing a five-year deal for a €7.5 million fee. He made his last appearance for Internacional on 15 May 2016, keeping a clean sheet in a 0–0 home draw against Chapecoense. During his four years with Internacional's senior side, Alisson made over 100 appearances across all competitions and won the Campeonato Gaúcho title in each season.

=== Roma ===
Alisson completed his transfer to Italian Serie A club Roma in July 2016. He made his debut for the club on 17 August 2016, starting in a 1–1 draw against Porto in UEFA Champions League, but spent most of the season as understudy to Wojciech Szczęsny. He ultimately made 15 appearances across all competitions from the season but failed to feature in any league fixtures. Szczęsny departed at the start of the following campaign for Juventus, which saw Alisson assume the number one jersey. He later revealed that he would have considered leaving Roma had he not been guaranteed more first-team football.

On 20 August 2017, Alisson made his Serie A debut on the opening weekend of the season, keeping a clean sheet in a 1–0 win over Atalanta. He then made his first appearance in the Derby della Capitale on 18 November, starting in a 2–1 win over local rivals Lazio. He was praised for his performances in the 2017–18 UEFA Champions League, and played a key role in the club's campaign in which they reached the semi-finals. The club didn't concede a single goal at the Stadio Olimpico in the Champions League, until the match against Liverpool in the semi-finals on 2 May 2018, which they won 4–2 on the night, but lost 7–6 on aggregate. Alisson received praise for his performances throughout the 2017–18 season. He kept a total of 22 clean sheets across the 2017–18 season, keeping 17 clean sheets in Serie A and 5 clean sheets in the UEFA Champions League.

=== Liverpool ===
==== 2018–19: Champions League title ====
On 19 July 2018, Liverpool confirmed the signing of Alisson for a fee of £66.8 million (€72.5 million), making him the most expensive goalkeeper of all time. However, the fee was broken just four weeks later when Chelsea signed Kepa Arrizabalaga for a reported £71.6 million (€80 million). On 10 August, Liverpool confirmed via their official website that he would wear the vacant number 13 shirt in the 2018–19 season.

Alisson made his debut for Liverpool on 12 August, keeping a clean sheet in a 4–0 win over West Ham United. He received praise for his subsequent performances in wins over Crystal Palace and Brighton & Hove Albion which saw him keep three consecutive clean sheets. In August, Alisson was shortlisted for UEFA Champions League Goalkeeper of the Season, finishing in second place. However, with Alisson in goal, Liverpool went on a run of 20 games unbeaten in the league from the start of the season which saw the Brazilian break Javier Mascherano's record for the longest-such streak. Alisson also played an important role in Liverpool's Champions League group stage campaign, making a vital save late on in their final group game against Napoli as Liverpool won 1–0 to advance to the knockout stages.

On 4 March 2019, he kept his 17th Premier League clean sheet for the season; the most by any Premier League goalkeeper in his debut season since former Liverpool goalkeeper, Pepe Reina in 2006. At the end of the season, Alisson kept a total of 21 clean sheets in Premier League, and won the Golden Glove. In the Champions League knockout stages, meanwhile, Alisson played a starring role as Liverpool advanced to their second consecutive final in the competition; in their second-leg semi-final at home to Barcelona, he made a number of impressive saves as Liverpool overturned a 3–0 first leg deficit to advance past their opponents with a 4–0 home win. In the final on 1 June 2019, Alisson kept a clean sheet for Liverpool as they defeated Tottenham Hotspur 2–0, making eight saves in the process, to win his first trophy with the club.

==== 2019–20: Premier League title ====
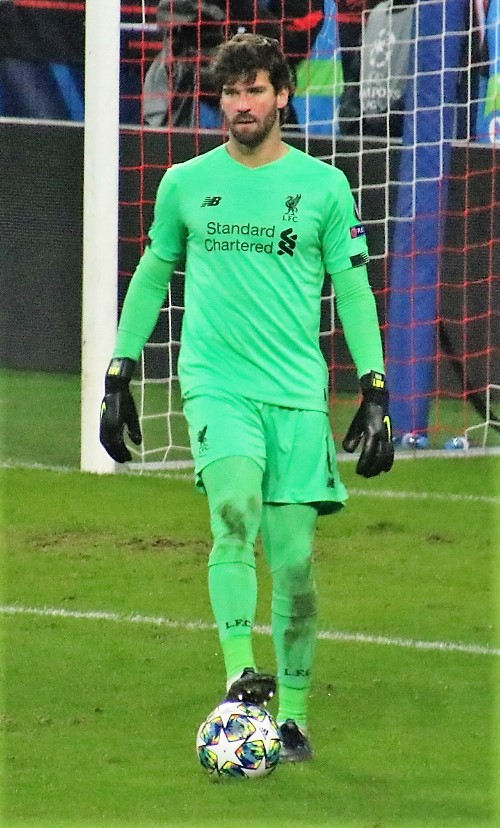
Alisson playing for Liverpool in 2019

After spending his first season with the designated squad number 13, it was announced that Alisson would be wearing the number 1 shirt for the 2019–20 season, which had previously been worn by Loris Karius.

Alisson started in the 2019 FA Community Shield against Manchester City on 4 August; after a 1–1 draw, Manchester City ultimately won the title 5–4 on penalties. On 9 August 2019, in the opening match of the 2019–20 Premier League season against newly promoted Norwich City at Anfield, Alisson picked up a calf injury in the first-half, and had to be replaced by new signing Adrián after 38 minutes. He was expected to be out injured for a "few weeks". As a result, he was ruled out of the 2019 UEFA Super Cup, which Liverpool won 5–4 on penalties on 14 August, following a 2–2 draw with Chelsea after extra-time. He returned to the matchday squad on 20 October, in a 1–1 draw with rivals Manchester United. On 30 November, in a 2–1 win over Brighton & Hove Albion, he was sent off for handling the ball outside his designated area. On 21 December, Alisson kept a clean sheet against Flamengo in the FIFA Club World Cup final with Liverpool winning the trophy for the first time. On 19 January 2020, Alisson assisted Mohamed Salah's 93rd-minute goal, in a 2–0 home win against Manchester United in the league.

On 6 March 2020, Alisson was injured again, meaning he missed the next day's Premier League win against Bournemouth, and the Champions League round of 16 second-leg defeat against Atlético Madrid, the final two Liverpool matches before the season was suspended due to the COVID-19 pandemic. He ended the 2019–20 Premier League with a Premier League winner's medal, having made 29 appearances.

==== 2020–21: Liverpool Goal of the Season ====
On 20 September 2020, Alisson saved a penalty in Liverpool's second league game of the 2020–21 Premier League season, a 2–0 away win against Chelsea. This was Alisson's first penalty save for Liverpool since joining the club, and Jorginho's first missed penalty in nine attempts for Chelsea in all competitions. On 7 February 2021, Alisson made two errors in the space of three minutes, conceding possession to allow Manchester City's İlkay Gündoğan and Raheem Sterling to score, as Liverpool lost 4–1. On 16 May 2021, Alisson scored a dramatic late winner in a 2–1 victory against West Bromwich Albion. With Liverpool chasing a spot in the top four and the score tied at 1–1, Alisson came up for a Liverpool corner in the 95th minute. The corner, taken by Trent Alexander-Arnold, found Alisson, who managed to score with a header. This was the first goal scored by a keeper in a competitive match in Liverpool's 129-year history, and Alisson became the sixth goalkeeper to score in the Premier League.

==== 2021–2023: Domestic cup double ====
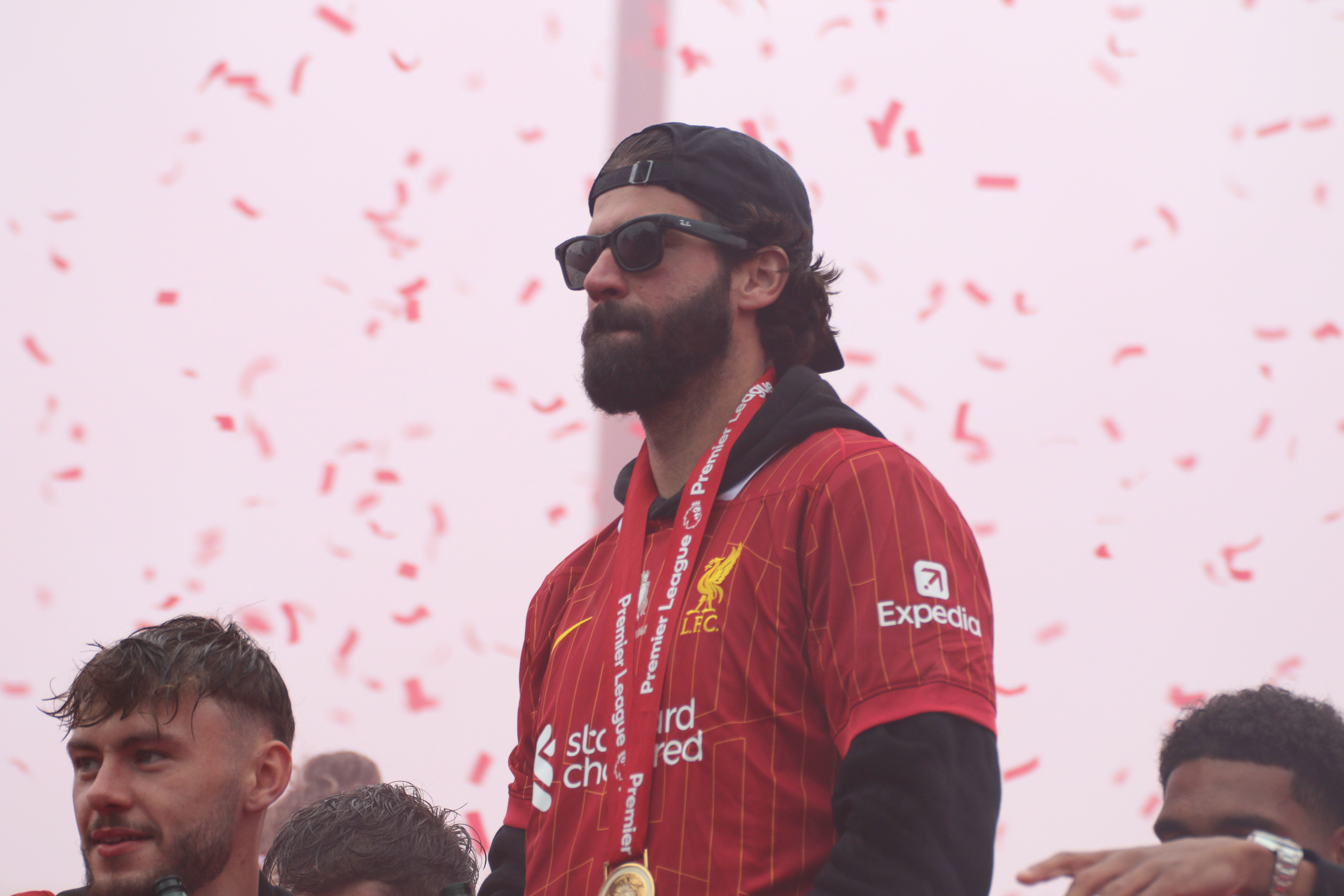
Alisson during the open-top bus parade after Liverpool won their second Premier League title in 2025

On 4 August 2021, prior to the start of the 2021–22 Premier League season, Alisson signed a new contract extension to stay with Liverpool until the summer of 2027. On 15 May 2022, Alisson won the FA Cup with Liverpool, defeating rivals Chelsea 6–5 on penalties in the final. Alisson saved a penalty from Mason Mount, allowing Liverpool's Kostas Tsimikas to score the winning penalty in the shoot-out. Moreover, Alisson earned a runners-up medal in the Champions League as Liverpool lost 1–0 to Real Madrid in the final. Liverpool narrowly missed out on the chance to achieve a historic quadruple, coming second in the Premier League and the 2021–22 UEFA Champions League but winning both the EFL Cup and the FA Cup.

On 16 October 2022, Alisson assisted Mohamed Salah for a late winning goal in Liverpool's 1–0 win over rivals Manchester City in the Premier League. Having already assisted Salah in February of the same year against Norwich City, Alisson became the goalkeeper with the most goal contributions in Premier League history, with 1 goal and 3 assists for Liverpool. Three days later, on 19 October, Alisson saved a penalty from Jarrod Bowen as Liverpool beat West Ham United 1–0 in the Premier League. Alisson was named Liverpool's Player of the Month for October 2022. Alisson reached 100 clean sheets for Liverpool on 6 May 2023 in a 1–0 victory against Brentford. At the end of the 2022–23 season, Liverpool narrowly missed out on UEFA Champions League qualification. Despite this, Alisson was widely praised as one of the best performers in the Premier League that season.

==== 2023–present: Second Premier League title ====
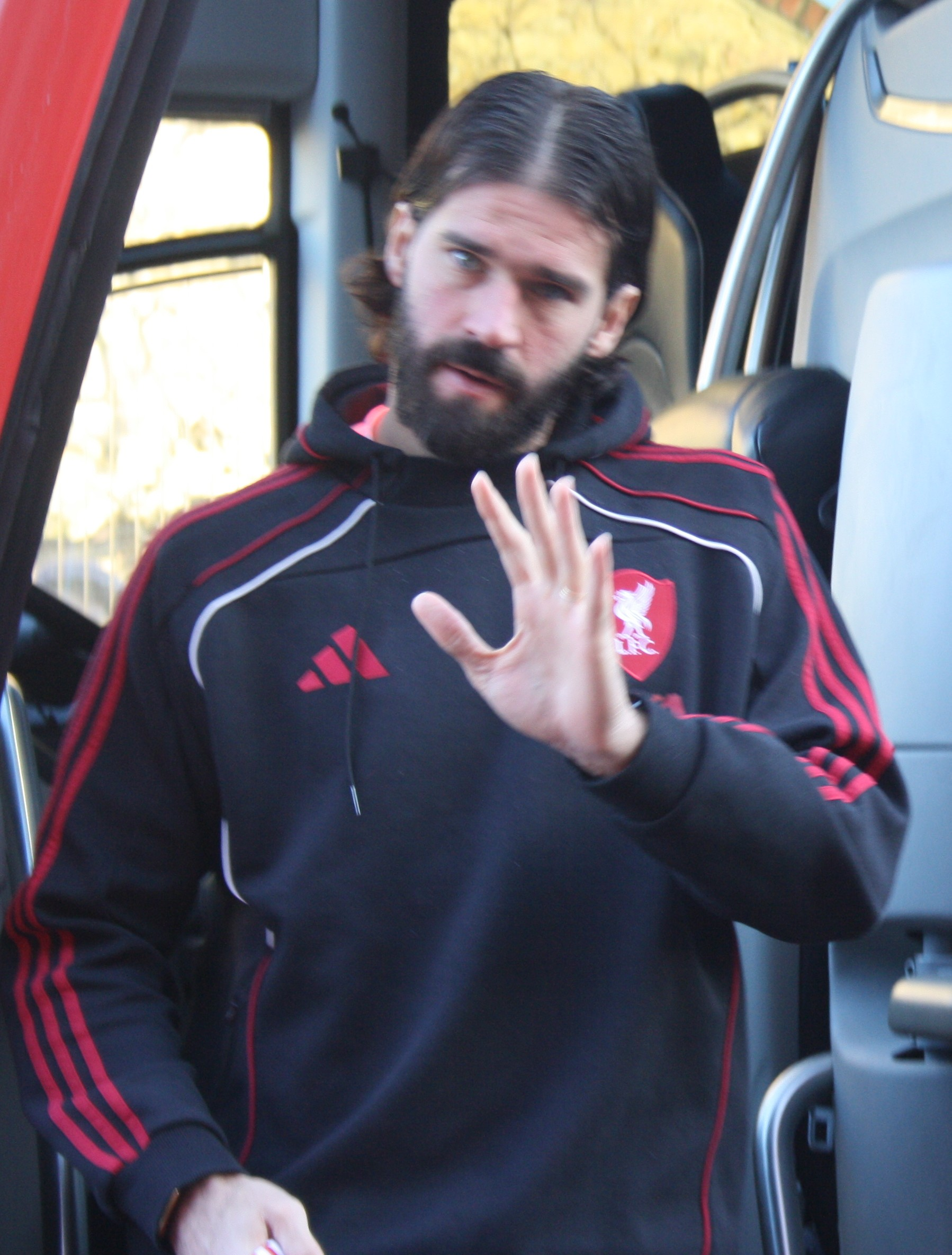
Alisson with Liverpool in 2026

On 27 August 2023, Alisson made an acrobatic save to deny Miguel Almirón from scoring in a 2–1 victory against Newcastle United which would later earn him the Premier League Save of the Month award for August. On 5 October 2024, he went off injured in the 79th minute during the club's 1–0 away win against Crystal Palace sidelining him for two months. He marked his return from injury by keeping a clean sheet in Liverpool's 1–0 away win against Girona in the UEFA Champions League on 10 December 2024.

On 5 March 2025, Alisson delivered a Man of the Match performance against Paris Saint-Germain in the first-leg of the UEFA Champions League Round of 16 tie as he made 9 saves to give Liverpool a clean sheet in a 1–0 away win. However, the club lost the tie in the penalty shoot-out after suffering a 1–0 defeat at Anfield in the second-leg. He eventually secured his second Premier League title with Liverpool at the end of the 2024–25 season.

== International career ==
=== 2015–17: Senior team breakthrough ===
After representing Brazil at under-17 and under-20 levels, Alisson was called up to the senior squad by manager Dunga for the first two matches of the 2018 FIFA World Cup qualification campaign against Chile and Venezuela. He made his debut against the latter on 13 October, starting in a 3–1 win at the Castelão.

On 5 May 2016, Alisson was named in Brazil's 23-man squad for the Copa América Centenario. In the team's first match, a goalless draw against Ecuador, he fumbled a Miller Bolaños shot into his own goal that was waved off because the ball had gone out of play beforehand. He conceded a total of two goals in three matches as Brazil were eliminated in the group stage.

=== 2018–19: The 2018 FIFA World Cup and the 2019 Copa América ===
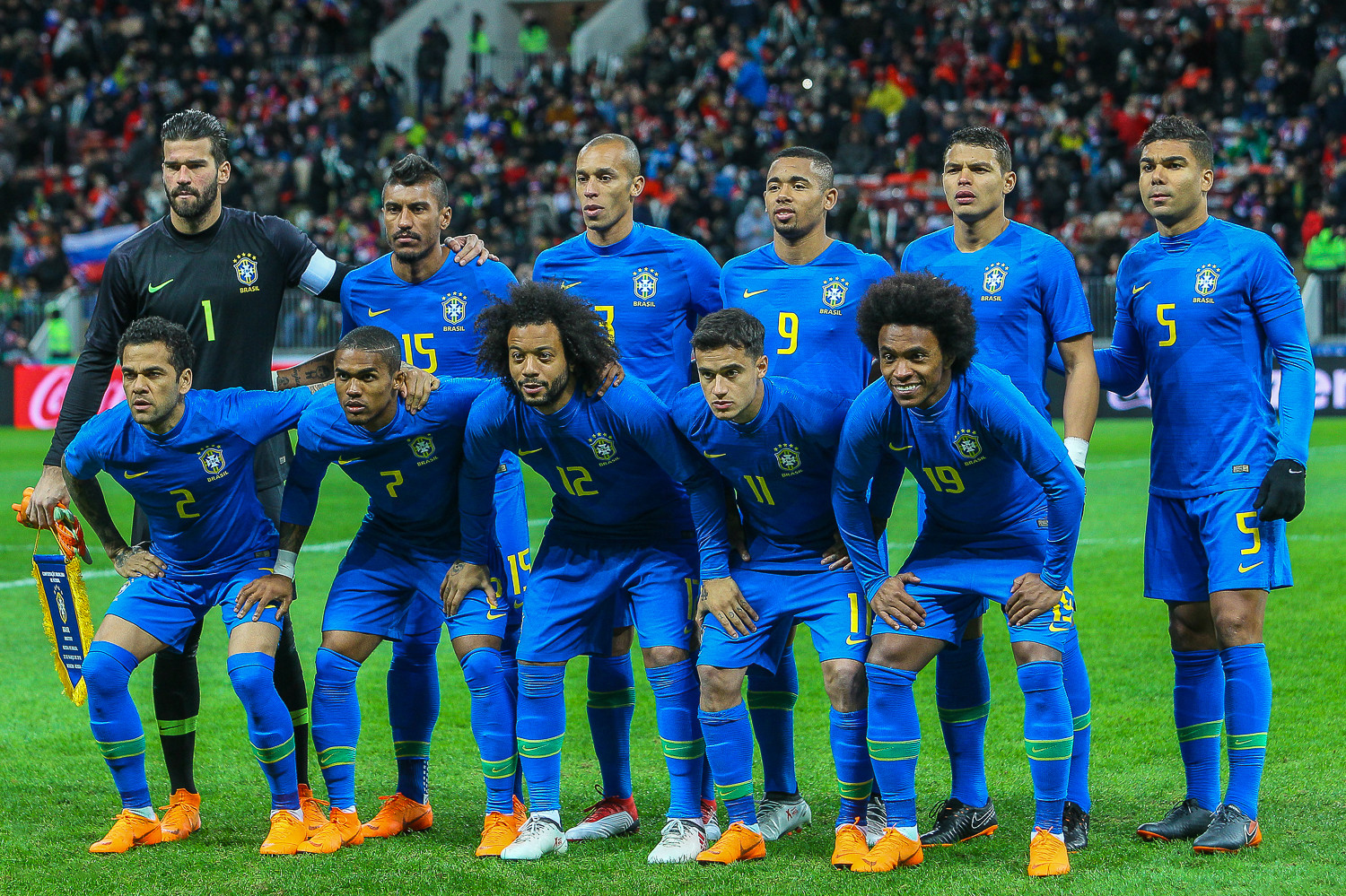
Alisson (in black) lining up with the Brazilian squad in 2018

In May 2018, Alisson was selected in the final 23-man squad for the 2018 World Cup in Russia. He was ever-present as Brazil made it to the quarter-finals before being knocked out by Belgium.

In May 2019, he was included by manager Tite in Brazil's 23-man squad for the 2019 Copa América on home soil. Throughout the tournament, he only conceded one goal in six matches, as Brazil went on to win the title. The only match in which Alisson failed to keep a clean sheet was the 3–1 final victory against Peru on 7 July, at the Maracanã Stadium, in which he was beaten by a Paolo Guerrero penalty. Following the tournament, Alisson was honoured with the Best Goalkeeper Award for his performances.

=== 2021: The 2021 Copa América ===
On 13 June 2021, he started in Brazil's opening match of the 2021 Copa América on home soil, keeping a clean sheet in a 3–0 win over Venezuela. He was an unused substitute in his nation's 1–0 defeat to rivals Argentina in the final on 10 July, with Ederson starting in his place.

=== 2021–24: The 2020 Summer Olympics the 2022 FIFA World Cup and the 2024 Copa América ===
On 15 June 2021, he was included in Brazil's 50-man preliminary squad for the 2020 Summer Olympics, though he was not included in the final squad.

On 7 November 2022, Alisson was named in the squad for the 2022 World Cup in Qatar. He played 2 group stage games before being rested against Cameroon, then started both knockout matches, although he was subbed out in the 80th minute against South Korea. Brazil were defeated by Croatia in the quarter-finals. On 20 May 2024, Alisson was included in Brazil's squad for the 2024 Copa América, where they were eliminated by Uruguay in the quarter-finals following a 4–2 penalty shoot-out defeat.

=== 2026–present: The 2026 FIFA World Cup ===
On 18 May 2026, Alisson was selected for Brazil's squad for the 2026 FIFA World Cup.

== Style of play ==
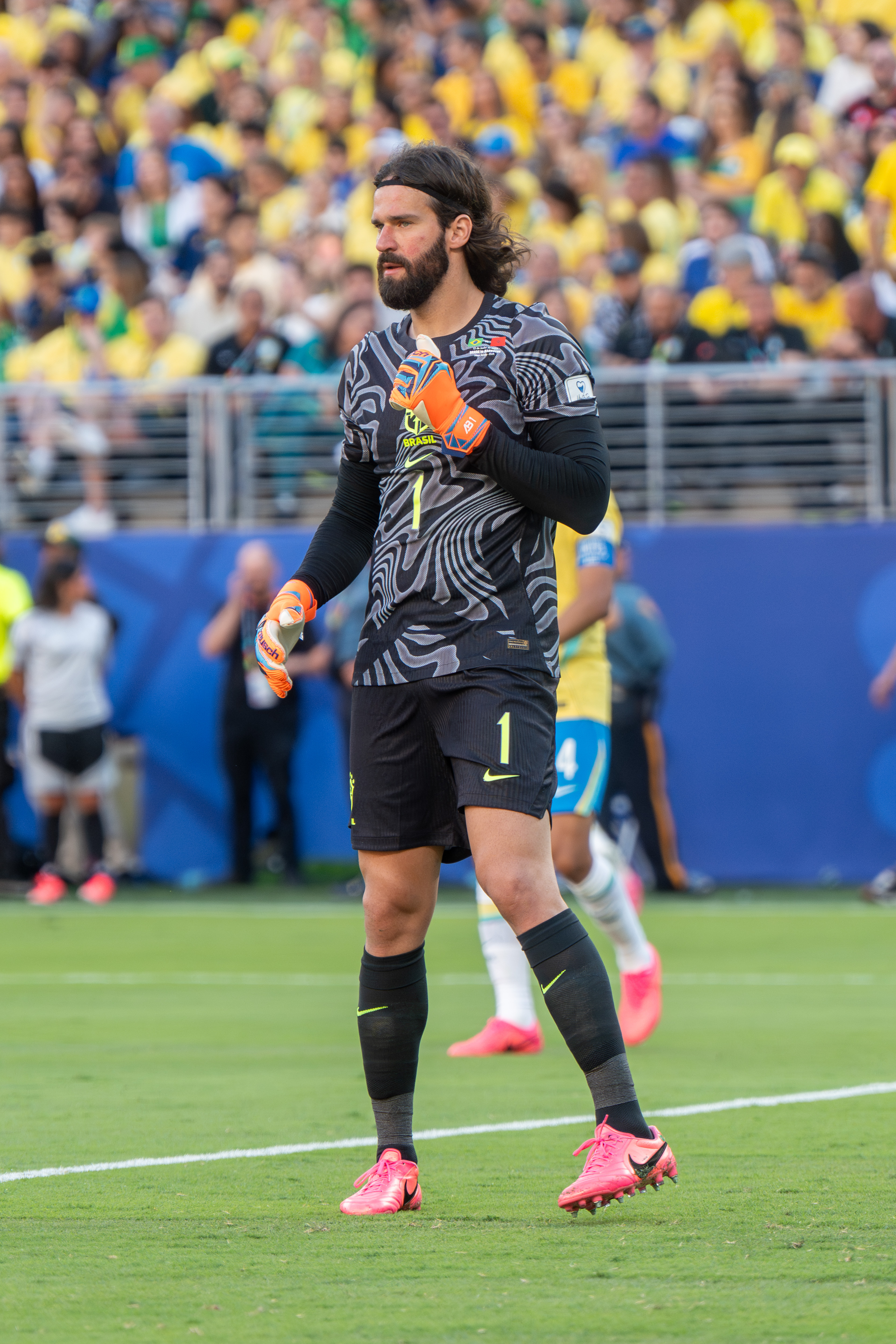
Alisson playing for Brazil at the 2026 FIFA World Cup

Alisson has been praised for his ability to produce crucial saves and brilliance in one-on-one situations, as well as his positioning, distribution and consistency; he is rated by some in the sport as the best goalkeeper in the world. Alisson cites former Barcelona goalkeeper Víctor Valdés as an inspiration, due to his ability to play out from the back, as well as Manuel Neuer, for his 'sweeper keeper' style. Alisson is also known for his speed and timing when rushing off his line, as well as his ability to clear or challenge for the ball with his feet outside the area, or get to ground quickly to collect or parry the ball inside the box; moreover, due to his distribution, he is capable of playing the ball out from the back quickly with his hands as well as his feet, and also has the ability to launch attacks, or pick out midfielders or attackers with his long goal kicks. His skills with the ball at his feet and composure in possession have even seen him take on opponents on occasion, when put under pressure, and allow his teams to play with a high defensive line.

Standing at 1.93 m (6 ft 4 in), Alisson is a goalkeeper who is recognized for his agility and athleticism. He is known for his shot-stopping and reflexes, and for a goalkeeping style built on anticipation, positioning, and composure rather than spectacular saves. He is also regarded for his handling and ability to claim crosses and commands his area.

Alisson is regarded by some sport pundits, due to his statistical performances, as the most proficient goalkeeper in the Premier League, and arguably even the best in the world, when left in an individual battle with an opponent. His playing style has also drawn comparisons with compatriots Júlio César, Muriel and Cláudio Taffarel in the media.

== Personal life ==
Alisson's older brother Muriel is also a goalkeeper and was developed at Internacional. Alisson's is of paternal German descent, with his father and grandmother speaking German fluently. While at Roma, Alisson was nicknamed "The German." He also holds a German passport. In addition to his native Portuguese, Alisson also speaks Italian, Spanish and English. In May 2019, he was appointed a goodwill ambassador by the World Health Organization (WHO).

In 2015, Alisson married Natália Loewe, a doctor from Brazil. They have a daughter, born on 29 April 2017 and a son, born on 14 June 2019. Their second son, was born on 10 May 2021. Alisson and Natália have been WHO advocates for pro-active care of mental health. On 24 February 2021, Alisson's father José Agostinho drowned in a lake near his holiday home in Lavras do Sul. Local officials believe no foul play was involved in the incident.

Alisson is a devout Pentecostal Christian, and holds baptisms in his swimming pool, hosting the baptisms of former Liverpool teammate and current Al Sadd player Roberto Firmino and the wife of current Atlético Mineiro player Fred. He has been nicknamed "The Holy Goalie" by teammate Virgil van Dijk due to his faith, and lifted the Champions League trophy wearing a T-shirt with a cross equals love heart featured on it.

On 28 November 2024, it was reported that Alisson has extended the contract with his agency, Neis World Sports that will see the latter remains as the agent for the goalkeeper. Further details about the contract extension were not disclosed.

== Career statistics ==
=== Club ===
As of match played 22 November 2026

Appearances and goals by club, season and competition
Club	Season	League			State league (Note: Includes Campeonato Gaúcho)		National cup (Note: Includes Copa do Brasil, Coppa Italia, FA Cup)		League cup (Note: Includes EFL Cup)		Continental		Other		Total	
Club	Season	Division	Apps	Goals	Apps	Goals	Apps	Goals	Apps	Goals	Apps	Goals	Apps	Goals	Apps	Goals
Internacional	2013	Série A	6	0	1	0	2	0	—		—		—		9	0
Internacional	2014	Série A	11	0	3	0	0	0	—		—		—		14	0
Internacional	2015	Série A	26	0	15	0	4	0	—		12 (Note: Appearances in Copa Libertadores)	0	—		57	0
Internacional	2016	Série A	1	0	17	0	0	0	—		—		3 (Note: Appearances in Primeira Liga)	0	21	0
Internacional	Total		44	0	36	0	6	0	—		12	0	3	0	101	0
Roma	2016–17	Serie A	0	0	—		4	0	—		11 (Note: One appearance in UEFA Champions League, ten appearances in UEFA Europa League)	0	—		15	0
Roma	2017–18	Serie A	37	0	—		0	0	—		12 (Note: Appearances in UEFA Champions League)	0	—		49	0
Roma	Total		37	0	—		4	0	—		23	0	—		64	0
Liverpool	2018–19	Premier League	38	0	—		0	0	0	0	13	0	—		51	0
Liverpool	2019–20	Premier League	29	0	—		0	0	0	0	5	0	3 (Note: One appearance in FA Community Shield, two appearances in FIFA Club World Cup)	0	37	0
Liverpool	2020–21	Premier League	33	1	—		1	0	0	0	7	0	1 (Note: Appearance in FA Community Shield)	0	42	1
Liverpool	2021–22	Premier League	36	0	—		4	0	1	0	13	0	—		54	0
Liverpool	2022–23	Premier League	37	0	—		2	0	0	0	8	0	0	0	47	0
Liverpool	2023–24	Premier League	28	0	—		2	0	0	0	2 (Note: Appearances in UEFA Europa League)	0	—		32	0
Liverpool	2024–25	Premier League	28	0	—		0	0	1	0	6	0	—		35	0
Liverpool	2025–26	Premier League	26	0	—		2	0	0	0	6	0	1	0	35	0
Liverpool	2026–27	Premier League	11	0	—		0	0	0	0	4	0	—		15	0
Liverpool	Total		266	1	—		11	0	2	0	64	0	5	0	348	1
Career total			347	1	36	0	21	0	2	0	99	0	8	0	513	1

=== International ===
As of match played 5 July 2026

Appearances and goals by national team and year
National team	Year	Apps	Goals
Brazil	2015	3	0
Brazil	2016	12	0
Brazil	2017	7	0
Brazil	2018	12	0
Brazil	2019	10	0
Brazil	2020	0	0
Brazil	2021	7	0
Brazil	2022	10	0
Brazil	2023	2	0
Brazil	2024	8	0
Brazil	2025	5	0
Brazil	2026	7	0
Total		83	0

== Honours ==
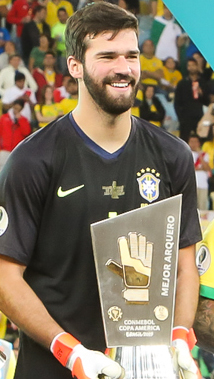
Alisson with the Golden Glove Award from the 2019 Copa América

Internacional

- Campeonato Gaúcho: 2013, 2014, 2015, 2016

Liverpool

- Premier League: 2019–20, 2024–25
- FA Cup: 2021–22
- EFL Cup: 2021–22, 2023–24; runner-up: 2024–25
- UEFA Champions League: 2018–19; runner-up: 2021–22
- FIFA Club World Cup: 2019
- FA Community Shield runner-up: 2025

Brazil U-17

- South American Under-17 Championship: 2009

Brazil U23

- Toulon Tournament: 2013

Brazil

- Copa América: 2019

Individual

- The Best FIFA Goalkeeper: 2019
- Yashin Trophy: 2019
- IFFHS World's Best Goalkeeper: 2019
- UEFA Champions League Goalkeeper of the Season: 2018–19
- Premier League Golden Glove: 2018–19, 2021–22
- Premier League Save of the Month: August 2023
- FIFPRO World 11: 2019, 2020
- UEFA Champions League Squad of the Season: 2017–18, 2018–19
- Serie A Goalkeeper of the Year: 2017–18
- Serie A Team of the Year: 2017–18
- Globe Soccer Awards Best Goalkeeper of the Year: 2018, 2019
- Copa América Golden Glove: 2019
- Copa América Team of the Tournament: 2019
- IFFHS Men's World Team: 2019
- Samba Gold: 2019
- UEFA Team of the Year: 2019
- IFFHS CONMEBOL Team of the Year: 2020
- Liverpool Goal of the Season: 2020–21
- PFA Team of the Year: 2021–22 Premier League
- Liverpool Players' Player of the Season: 2022–23

== See also ==
- List of goalscoring goalkeepers
