= Wojciech Szczęsny =

Polish footballer (born 1990)

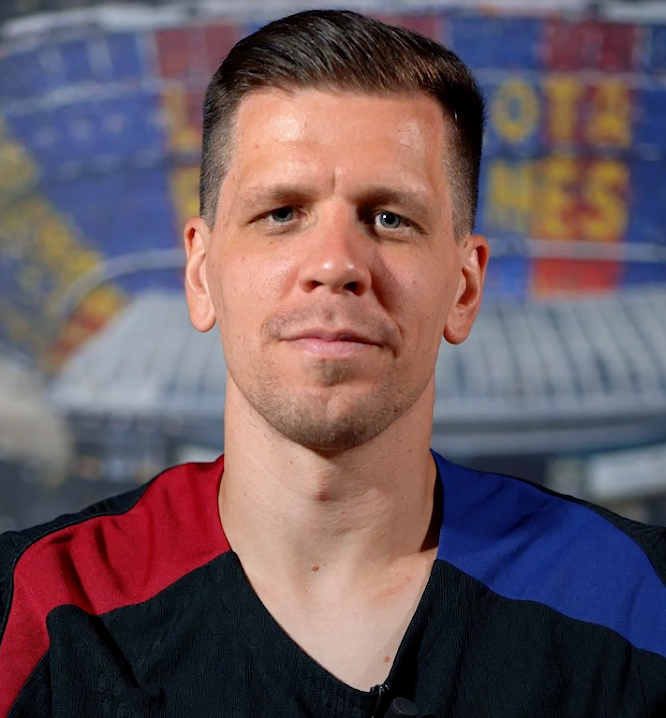
- Szczęsny with Barcelona in 2025

Personal information
- Full name: Wojciech Tomasz Szczęsny
- Date of birth: 18 April 1990 (age 36)
- Place of birth: Warsaw, Poland
- Height: 1.95 m (6 ft 5 in)
- Position: Goalkeeper

Team information
- Current team: Barcelona
- Number: 13

Youth career
- 2004–2005: Agrykola Warsaw
- 2005–2006: Legia Warsaw
- 2006–2009: Arsenal

Senior career*
Years	Team	Apps	(Gls)
2009–2017	Arsenal	132	(0)
2009–2010	→ Brentford (loan)	28	(0)
2015–2017	→ Roma (loan)	72	(0)
2017–2024	Juventus	200	(0)
2024–	Barcelona	24	(0)

International career
2007–2010	Poland U20	4	(0)
2009–2012	Poland U21	7	(0)
2009–2024	Poland	84	(0)
- * Club domestic league appearances and goals as of 22:21, 16 September 2026 (UTC)

Wojciech Tomasz Szczęsny (Polish pronunciation: [ˈvɔjt͡ɕɛx ˈtɔmaʂ ˈʂt͡ʂɛ̃snɨ]; born 18 April 1990) is a Polish professional footballer who plays as a goalkeeper for La Liga club Barcelona.

After starting his club career at Legia Warsaw, Szczęsny signed for Arsenal in January 2006, where he made his professional debut in 2009. After a spell on loan with Brentford the following season, he later became the capital club's first choice goalkeeper, winning two FA Cups and being the joint recipient of the 2013–14 Premier League Golden Glove alongside Petr Čech. He subsequently went on two consecutive season-long loans to Italian club Roma in 2015, where his performances earned him a move to reigning league champions Juventus in 2017. After serving mainly as a back-up to Gianluigi Buffon in his first season, during which he won a domestic double, he inherited the starting spot from the departed Buffon the following season, winning his second Serie A title; his performances also earned him a Yashin Trophy nomination in 2019. He won a third consecutive league title the following season, also winning the Serie A Best Goalkeeper Award. He briefly retired from professional football in 2024, before reversing his decision shortly after to join Barcelona, where he won a domestic treble in his debut season.

At international level, Szczęsny earned 84 caps for Poland between his debut in 2009 and 2024, and was included in the nation's squad as it co-hosted UEFA Euro 2012; he would later participate in three more editions of the tournament (2016, 2020 and 2024), as well as two FIFA World Cups (2018 and 2022).

== Early life ==
Szczęsny was born in Warsaw. He is the son of Maciej Szczęsny, who was also a professional goalkeeper, having played for Legia Warsaw, Widzew Łódź, Polonia Warsaw and Wisła Kraków, along with seven games for the Poland national team. His brother Jan (born 1987) is also a goalkeeper.

== Club career ==
=== Legia Warsaw ===
Szczęsny trained at Agrykola Warsaw as a young player; soon, Legia Warsaw's goalkeeping coach, Krzysztof Dowhań, was so impressed with the young keeper, he allowed him to take part in a training camp with Legia's first team at the age of 15, joining them afterwards.

=== Arsenal ===
In January 2006, Szczęsny joined the Arsenal youth set-up, progressing to the reserve team during the 2008–09 season. In November 2008, he lost his balance while lifting a heavy weight and both his forearms were fractured, causing him to miss five months. Szczęsny appeared on the first-team bench for the first time during the Premier League match against Stoke City on 24 May 2009, remaining unused as the team concluded their season with a 4–1 victory at the Emirates Stadium.

At the start of the 2009–10 season, Szczęsny was promoted to the senior squad and given the number 53. On 22 September 2009, he made his first-team debut in the Football League Cup third round, keeping a clean sheet in a 2–0 home win against West Bromwich Albion. In December 2009, manager Arsène Wenger revealed that he and the rest of Arsenal's coaching staff had high hopes for Szczęsny, saying, "We have identified Wojciech as a future great, great goalkeeper." A month later, he added, "I really believe in him that he will one day be Arsenal's number one. He has all the qualities you want from a goalkeeper."

==== Brentford (loan) ====
Wojciech Szczesny
(@13Szczesny13)
tweeted:

What a joke! Andy Scott sacked?! He is a fantastic manager and Brentford will pay the price for his sacking I'm afraid.

3 February 2011

Wojciech Szczesny
(@13Szczesny13)
tweeted:

Just to remind you... Brentford were struggling in League Two when AS took over! He is the only reason why Brentford is in League One!

3 February 2011

On 20 November 2009, Szczęsny joined League One team Brentford on a month's loan. He saved a second-half penalty in his second match, a 1–0 loss to Wycombe Wanderers. Szczęsny completed his fifth game for Brentford on 12 December 2009, where he made a number of saves to keep out Leeds United and was given the Man of the Match award. On 22 December, Arsenal agreed to extend the loan for a second month until 17 January 2010, and then until 31 January. Finally, it was extended until 31 May.

In April 2010, Brentford manager Andy Scott said, "His performances suggest that he would not be out of place in the Championship or even the Premier League. It has reached the stage where when he lets in a goal we wonder why he hasn't saved it." One year later, after Scott was sacked as Brentford manager, Szczęsny strongly criticised the club on Twitter, and hoped that Scott would not be unemployed for long. In February 2015, Szczęsny was named as Brentford's "Keeper of the Decade" in a club poll.

==== 2010–11 ====
On 27 October 2010, Szczęsny made his second appearance for Arsenal in the League Cup, keeping a clean sheet against Newcastle United at St James' Park and stopping numerous attempts from Newcastle players. He signed a new long-term contract on 11 November 2010, thanking both his father and his goalkeeping coach, Josh Phelan, for helping him progress in his breakthrough season. Szczęsny made his Premier League debut in the 1–0 loss to Manchester United at Old Trafford on 13 December 2010, deputising for Łukasz Fabiański and Manuel Almunia, who both missed the match through injury. On 8 January 2011, he started the FA Cup third-round match against Leeds United. The following weekend, Szczęsny kept his first league clean sheet in a 3–0 win over West Ham United at Upton Park.

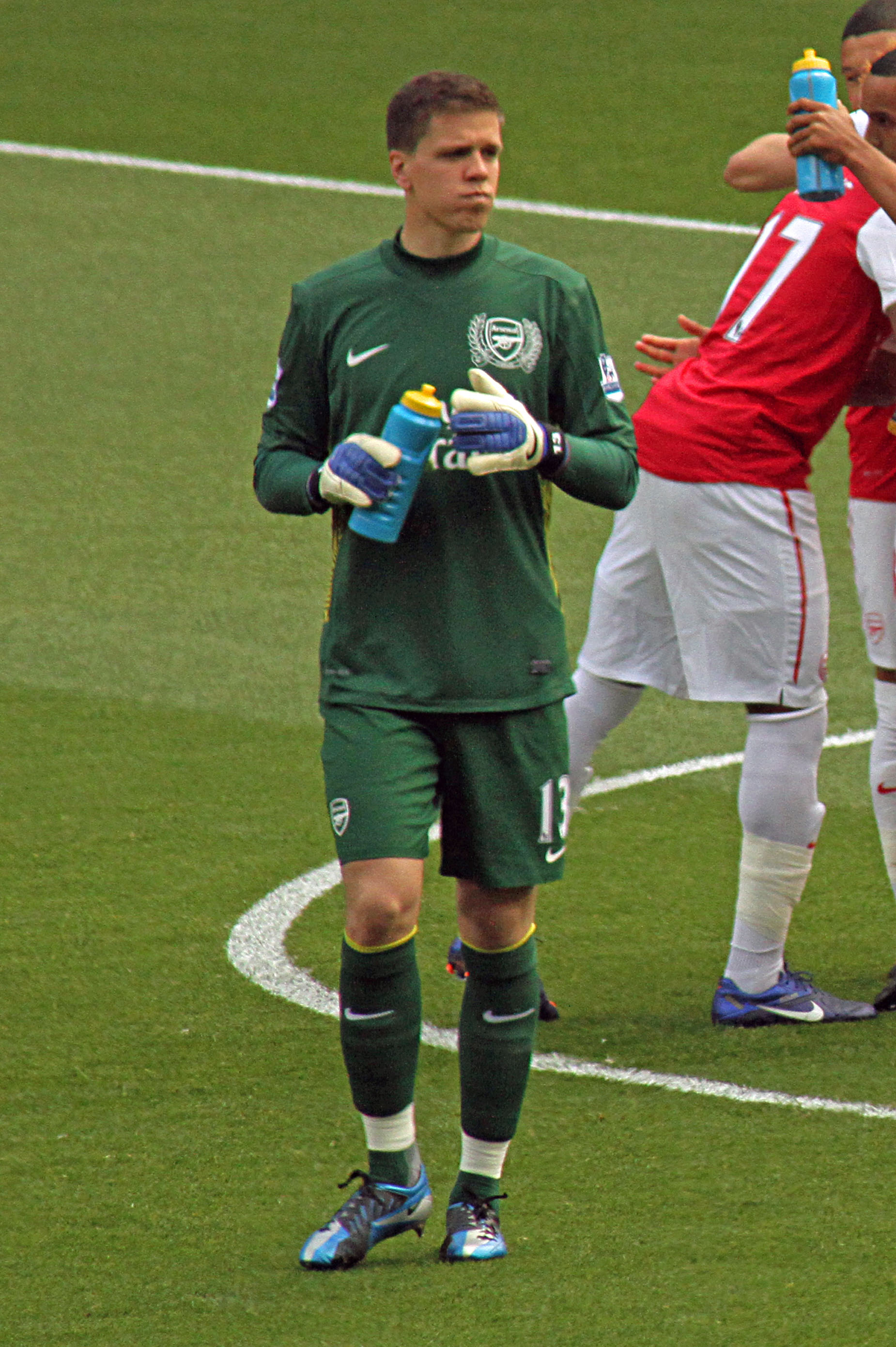
Wojciech Szczęsny before a match against Chelsea in 2012.

Following Szczęsny's form after playing consecutive Premier League matches, Arsène Wenger confirmed that he would remain Arsenal's first choice goalkeeper, stating, "he's done nothing for me to take him out." On 16 February, Szczęsny made his UEFA Champions League debut against Barcelona at the Emirates Stadium, making saves in a 2–1 victory. On 27 February, Szczęsny let in a last-minute Birmingham City winner in the League Cup Final; a header from Nikola Žigić caused confusion between Szczęsny and defender Laurent Koscielny where the latter pulled out of a clearance at the last minute causing the former to lose control of the ball, which rolled right into the path of Birmingham forward Obafemi Martins, who converted from close range.

==== 2011–12 ====
In July 2011, Szczęsny expressed his desire to continue as Arsenal's first choice goalkeeper for the rest of his career. He played a half in each of Arsenal's pre-season games on their tour of Malaysia and China. Szczęsny was assigned the number 13 jersey, formerly worn by Alexander Hleb and Jens Lehmann. During the 2011–12 season, he became Arsenal's first-choice goalkeeper, playing every minute of the team's Premier League matches. On 24 August, Szczęsny made a vital penalty save in the 59th minute of play against Antonio Di Natale in the second leg of the Champions League qualifying round. Arsenal were tied 1–1 (2–1 on aggregate) against Udinese and Szczęsny's penalty save proved vital in securing Arsenal a spot in the lucrative group stage of the competition for the 14th-straight season. Arsenal went on to win the game 2–1 (3–1 on aggregate) with goals coming from Robin van Persie and Theo Walcott. On 28 August, he played in the 8–2 defeat to Manchester United at Old Trafford which turned out to be Arsenal's heaviest ever defeat in the Premier League and the first time they conceded eight goals for over 115 years. On 26 February 2012, Szczęsny finished on the winning side in a North London derby for the first time, as Arsenal came from 2–0 down to win 5–2 at home to Tottenham Hotspur. On 3 March 2012, Szczęsny made a number of important saves and blocked an early penalty to help Arsenal win against Liverpool at Anfield.

==== 2012–13 ====
Following the release of Manuel Almunia, Szczęsny was given the vacated number 1 shirt. After a couple of months out with injury, Szczęsny made his return in the 5–2 win against Tottenham.

On 13 March 2013, Szczęsny was dropped from the Arsenal team to play Bayern Munich in the Champions League. In Arsenal's next Premier League match, against Swansea City, Szczęsny returned to the Arsenal squad but was named only as a substitute, with Łukasz Fabiański selected to start in goal by Arsène Wenger.

On 20 April 2013, Szczęsny returned to the team in a Premier League match at home to Everton due to a rib injury sustained by Fabiański. In his first two matches back in the Arsenal goal, he kept consecutive clean sheets against Everton and Fulham respectively.

==== 2013–14 ====
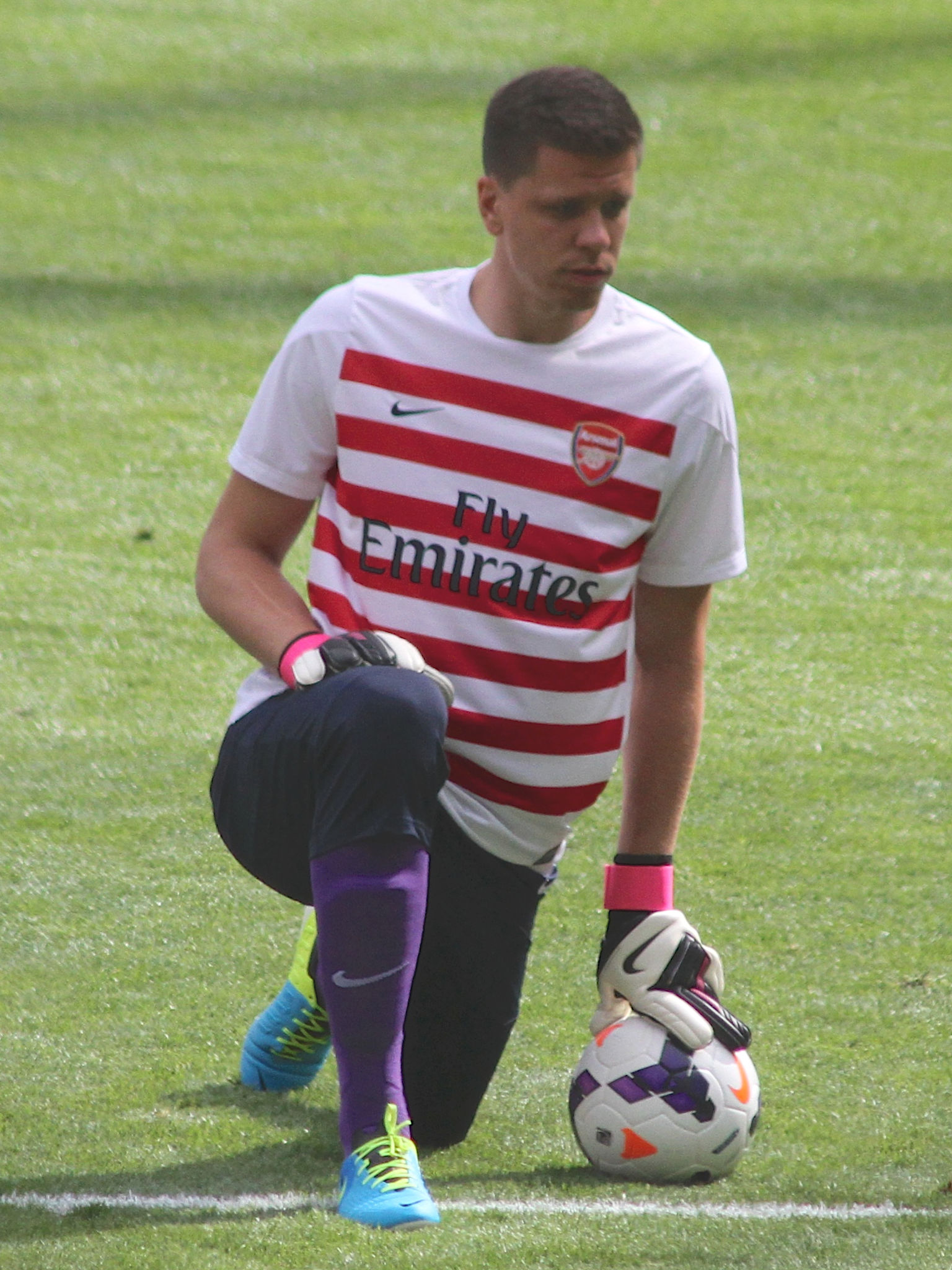
Szczęsny warming up during the 2013 Emirates Cup

Szczęsny had a testing time in the opening fixture of the 2013–14 Premier League season, as Arsenal lost 3–1 to Aston Villa. During the match, he conceded a penalty after tripping Gabriel Agbonlahor. Despite the disappointment, Szczęsny responded well by keeping three clean sheets in Arsenal's following four matches. He also made two crucial saves to help preserve Arsenal's 1–0 lead away to Crystal Palace in October, as well as keeping two consecutive clean sheets in vital wins over Liverpool and Borussia Dortmund in the Champions League. In a November 2013 match against Manchester United, Szczęsny received lengthy treatment following a head-to-head injury with Phil Jones, but finished the game after Arsenal manager Arsène Wenger allowed him to continue. Wenger said he would have substituted for Szczęsny if instructed by the team doctor, but added, "No, nobody told me anything about him", when asked if medical staff had cleared the goalkeeper to play. Tottenham coach André Villas-Boas was heavily criticised the previous week for keeping concussed keeper Hugo Lloris in a match against Everton.

On 16 November 2013, Arsenal announced that Szczęsny had signed a new long-term contract with the club. His excellent form continued throughout November, a month in which he conceded just one goal and kept five clean sheets in six matches. He also recorded his 50th clean sheet for Arsenal on 26 November, in a Champions League match against Marseille which Arsenal won 2–0. Szczęsny conceded a penalty and was sent off in a Champions League match against Bayern Munich in February 2014 for a foul on Arjen Robben. As he left the field, he made an offensive hand gesture. David Alaba missed the penalty, but Arsenal lost the match 2–0. In the process, Szczęsny became the 100th player sent off during Arsène Wenger's reign at Arsenal.

At the end of the season, Szczęsny was jointly award the Premier League Golden Glove award alongside Petr Čech of Chelsea, with both keeping 16 clean sheets. He also ended the season by winning his first senior trophy with Arsenal, the 2013–14 FA Cup, but was only a substitute in the final itself, with Łukasz Fabiański retaining his place as first choice goalkeeper for domestic cup competitions.

==== 2014–15 ====
Szczęsny conceded a penalty and was sent off in a 4–1 Champions League home win against Galatasaray on 1 October 2014 for a professional foul on Burak Yılmaz.

On 1 January 2015, Szczęsny made errors leading to both goals in Arsenal's 2–0 defeat at Southampton. He was later fined £20,000 by the club for smoking in the changing room showers after the match. He was dropped to the bench for the rest of the Premier League season, with David Ospina replacing him in goal. Szczęsny was selected to start in the 2015 FA Cup Final, keeping a clean sheet in a 4–0 victory over Aston Villa at Wembley Stadium.

==== 2015–16 ====
On 29 July 2015, with his opportunities further limited by Arsenal's signing of Petr Čech earlier that summer, Szczęsny joined Roma on a season-long loan. He made his Serie A debut on 22 August in a 1–1 draw at Hellas Verona. Szczęsny dislocated a finger during Roma's opening Champions League match against Barcelona after clashing with Luis Suárez, an injury that kept him out for six weeks. In December, he was dropped for Morgan De Sanctis for a league game against Atalanta after again being caught smoking following a 6–1 loss to Barcelona. In total, he made 31 league appearances throughout the season, as Roma finished the 2015–16 season with a third place in the league, clinching the last available Champions League qualifying spot. In an interview with Il Tempo newspaper, Szczęsny stated that he felt that his season with Roma had been positive, and credited his experience training and playing in Italy under manager Luciano Spalletti and goalkeeper coach Nanni as being extremely beneficial to his development.

==== 2016–17 ====
A second season-long loan to Roma was agreed by Arsenal, ahead of the 2016–17 season. During the summer of 2016, Roma also signed Brazilian goalkeeper Alisson Becker from Internacional, meaning that Szczęsny would face competition for a starting spot in the team. In his second season in the Italian capital, Szczęsny kept the most clean sheets in Serie A (14), helping Roma to set a club seasonal record of 87 points, and earn a second-place finish in the league. In total, he made 72 appearances in Serie A over the course of his two seasons with Roma.

=== Juventus ===
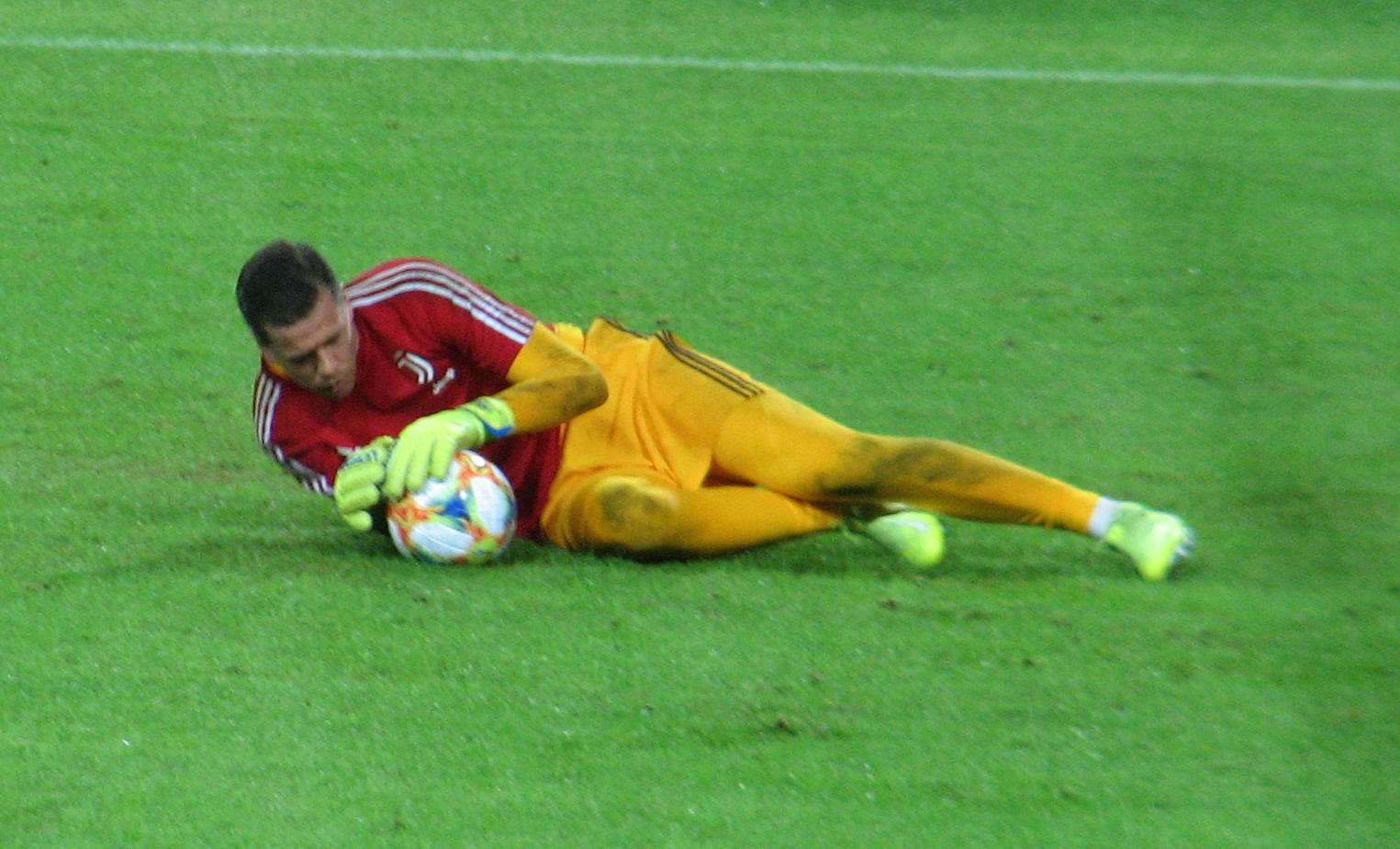
Szczęsny warming up for Juventus in the 2019–20 preseason

==== 2017–18 ====
On 19 July 2017, Szczęsny was signed by Juventus for a €12.2 million initial fee (plus an additional €3.1m in conditional bonuses) on a four-year contract. Although it was reported that Szczęsny would initially serve as a back-up to Gianluigi Buffon under manager Massimiliano Allegri, the latter goalkeeper's intention to retire at the end of the 2017–18 season saw Szczęsny labelled as a potential long-term replacement for Buffon in the media. On 9 September 2017, Szczęsny made his first appearance for Juventus, achieving a clean sheet as he started in their third match of the season, a 3–0 home win over Chievo in Serie A.

Following Juventus's 1–0 away victory against fellow title contenders Napoli on 1 December, the club's first-choice goalkeeper Buffon was ruled out of Juventus's final Champions League group match against Olympiacos four days later, after picking up a calf strain in the previous match, an injury which kept him sidelined for the rest of the month; Szczęsny replaced him in goal during the 2–0 away win, which saw him make his club debut in the Champions League, and the result secured Juventus a second-place finish in their group behind Barcelona, and a place in the knockout stages of the competition. His performances throughout Buffon's absence saw him named the club's player of the month for December 2017. On 9 May, Szczęsny won his first trophy with Juventus in a 4–0 win over Milan in the 2018 Coppa Italia Final; he was an unused substitute. Four days later, on 13 May, Szczęsny won the Scudetto, after keeping a clean sheet in a 0–0 draw with his former team Roma, in Juventus' penultimate match of the season.

==== 2018–19 ====
Following Buffon's departure from the club after the conclusion of the 2017–18 season, Szczęsny inherited the number 1 shirt and the starting goalkeeper spot at Juventus ahead of the 2018–19 season, despite competition from newcomer Mattia Perin. On 18 September, Szczęsny saved Dani Parejo's penalty in the match won 2–0 against Valencia. He repeated himself on 11 November when Szczęsny saved his former teammate Gonzalo Higuaín's penalty allowing Juventus win 2–0 against AC Milan. On 20 April, he started in Juventus's 2–1 home victory over rivals Fiorentina, which saw his side clinch the Serie A title. His performances throughout the season earned him a Yashin Trophy nomination in 2019.

==== 2019–20 ====
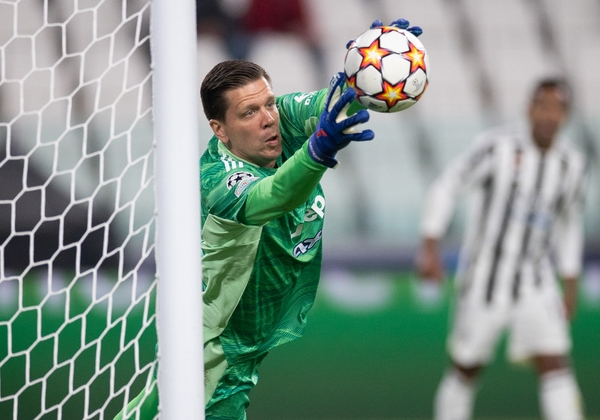
Szczęsny making a save for Juventus in 2021

Upon Buffon's return to Juventus in the summer of 2019, Szczęsny offered him the number 1 shirt, but Buffon turned it down, saying "I didn't come back to take something from someone or take it back. [...] I just want to do my bit for the team. It's only right that the starting goalkeeper, Szcz[ę]sny, has the number 1 jersey". Instead, Buffon chose to wear number 77, the same number he had worn during his final season at Parma before initially joining Juventus in 2001. On 7 December, Szczęsny saved Ciro Immobile's penalty in a 3–1 defeat to Lazio. On 26 July 2020, he kept a clean-sheet in a 2–0 home win over Sampdoria, which allowed Juventus to clinch the Serie A title. For his performances, he was named the Best Goalkeeper of the season by Lega Serie A.

==== 2020–2024 ====
On 20 September, Szczęsny made his 100th appearance in all competitions for Juventus in the club's opening match of the season, a 3–0 home win over Sampdoria in Serie A. On 2 May 2021, Szczęsny saved Andrey Galabinov's penalty in a 3–0 win against Spezia. Szczęsny repeated himself on 9 May when he saved Franck Kessie's penalty in a 3–0 defeat against AC Milan.

On 18 October 2021, Szczęsny saved Jordan Veretout's penalty allowing Juventus win 1–0 against his former team Roma. Against the same team, Szczęsny saved Lorenzo Pellegrini's penalty allowing Juventus win 4–3.

On 28 February 2023, Szczęsny made his 200th appearance for Juventus in a 4–2 win against Torino in the Derby della Mole. During the 2023–24 season, Szczęsny started in 35 league matches as Juventus finished third.

On 14 August 2024, Szczęsny and Juventus agreed to mutually terminate his contract and he departed as a free agent. On 27 August, he announced his decision to retire from professional football.

=== Barcelona ===
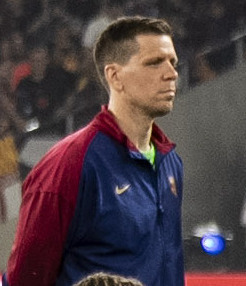
Szczęsny with Barcelona during the 2025 Copa del Rey final

On 2 October 2024, Szczęsny returned to football just over a month after announcing his retirement, signing for La Liga club Barcelona on a contract until the end of the 2024–25 season. He was chosen to replace first choice goalkeeper Marc-André ter Stegen, whose season was cut short due to long term injury. Hansi Flick confirmed that Szczęsny would initially take on the backup role behind Iñaki Peña.

He made his debut for Barcelona on 4 January 2025, during a 4–0 victory over UD Barbastro in Copa del Rey. He then started both matches in the Supercopa de España against Athletic Bilbao and Real Madrid. Despite being sent off in the final against the latter, his team managed to secure the title following a 5–2 victory.

On 5 March 2025, during the first leg of the UEFA Champions League Round of 16, Barcelona faced Benfica at the Estádio da Luz. Defender Pau Cubarsí received a red card in the 22nd minute, leaving the team to play with ten men for the majority of the game. Despite this, he made eight crucial saves to maintain a clean sheet, leading to a 1–0 win. Szczęsny's performance was widely praised by both fans and analysts.

On 26 April 2025, Szczęsny played the full 120 minutes of normal time and extra time in the Copa del Rey final against rivals Real Madrid, making 5 saves, including a double save against Vinícius Júnior in a 3–2 victory for Barcelona. In the 2024–25 La Liga season, Szczęsny played in 15 matches, including the title-clinching win against Espanyol on 15 May 2025. Later that year, on 7 July, he extended his contract with the club until 2027.

== International career ==
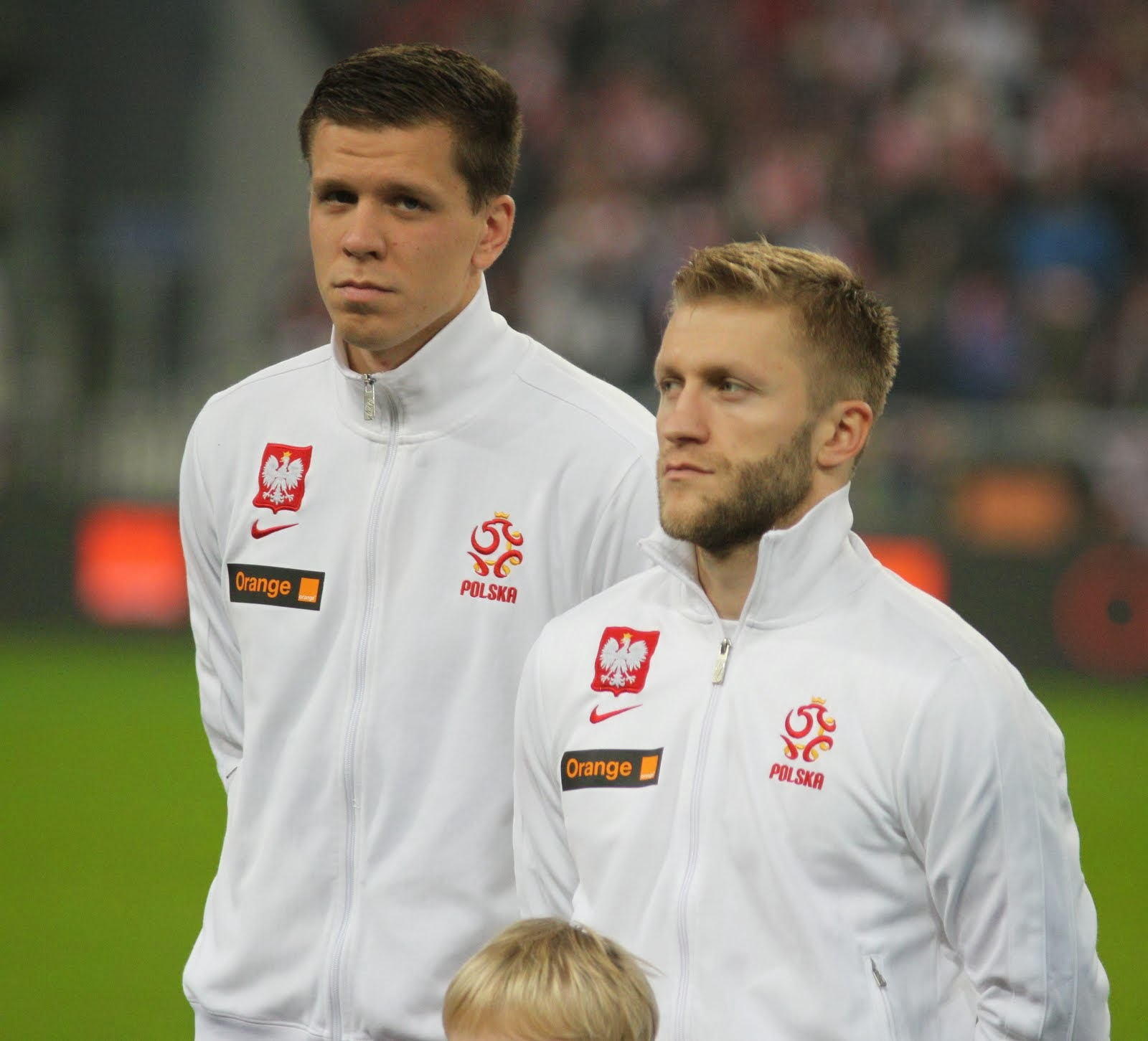
Szczęsny (left) with Jakub Błaszczykowski before an international friendly against the Republic of Ireland

=== Under-21 ===
Szczęsny played for Poland's under-21 team and started in three 2011 European Championship qualifying matches. He was also placed on stand-by for the Polish senior team by manager Leo Beenhakker for the team's World Cup qualifiers against Northern Ireland and Slovenia in early September 2009. Since none of Poland's top three goalkeepers dropped out, however, he was not called up and instead played the U-21 qualifiers against Spain and Finland. He has a total of six caps for the U-21 squad.

=== Senior team ===
==== Early senior career ====
In October 2009, new manager Franciszek Smuda sent Szczęsny his first call up to the full national side, for the friendly matches against Romania and Canada. He made his debut against Canada on 18 November, coming on as a half-time substitute for Tomasz Kuszczak in a 1–0 victory at the Zdzislawa Krzyszkowiaka Stadium in Bydgoszcz. He earned his second cap and his first full match on 9 February 2011, in another friendly win of the same score, against Norway at the Estádio Algarve.

Szczęsny had a strong performance against Germany on 6 September 2011, making eight critical saves in a 2–2 draw; this earned him praise from former German international goalkeeper Oliver Kahn. He was sent off in the opening game of Poland's co-hosting of UEFA Euro 2012 against Greece, for a professional foul on Dimitris Salpingidis, costing Poland a penalty which was saved by Przemysław Tytoń in a 1–1 draw. Szczęsny failed to play again for the rest of the tournament as Tytoń played the remainder as Poland finished bottom of Group A with two points.

On 12 October 2014, Szczęsny was pivotal in securing his country's historic first victory over Germany in a Euro 2016 qualifier. He played in his nation's opening game of the tournament against Northern Ireland and kept a clean sheet in his nation's first ever victory at a European Championship, but suffered an injury which kept him out of the rest of their campaign. Nonetheless, Poland made it to the quarter-finals, with former Arsenal teammate Łukasz Fabiański in goal, where they were eliminated from the tournament on penalties by eventual champions Portugal.

==== 2018 FIFA World Cup and UEFA Euro 2020 ====
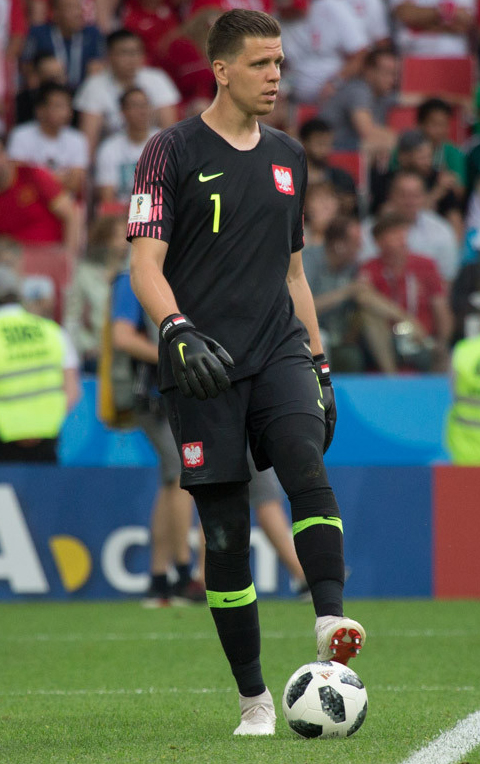
Szczęsny with Poland at the 2018 FIFA World Cup

Szczęsny was called up to the 23-man Polish squad for the 2018 FIFA World Cup in Russia. He started in his nation's first two group matches, a 2–1 defeat against Senegal and 3–0 defeat to Colombia, but did not feature in his team's final group match – a 1–0 victory over Japan; Poland failed to qualify for the knockout phase.

On 14 June 2021, Szczęsny scored an own goal in a 2–1 defeat against Slovakia in the UEFA Euro 2020, becoming the first goalkeeper to do so in the UEFA European Championships. His own goal was the fastest in European Championship history, breaking Igor Tudor's record of 22 minutes vs France in 2004 until Denis Zakaria scored an own goal after eight minutes vs Spain later in the same tournament. The team suffered another early elimination after only scoring a point in their three group matches.

==== 2022: Nations League and FIFA World Cup ====
On 25 September 2022, he became the most capped goalkeeper in the Polish football history by participating in an away UEFA Nations League match against Wales, which Poland won 1–0 and secured its place in the League A of the tournament. It was his 66th appearance in the national team, which allowed him to surpass the record previously held by Artur Boruc.

In November 2022, Szczęsny was named in the final squad for the 2022 FIFA World Cup in Qatar. On 26 November, he saved a penalty from Salem Al-Dawsari and another rebound shot from Mohammed Al-Breik in a 2–0 victory over Saudi Arabia. On 30 November, he saved his second penalty of the World Cup against Lionel Messi of Argentina, becoming only the third goalkeeper in history to save two penalties at one World Cup tournament alongside Jan Tomaszewski (1974) and Brad Friedel (2002). Despite a 2–0 loss against the latter, Poland qualified to the round of 16 ahead of Mexico on goal difference, with his double saves against Saudi Arabia proving crucial in securing Poland a place in the last sixteen. The team were eliminated in the next round, losing out 3–1 to eventual runners-up France.

==== UEFA Euro 2024 ====
On 26 March 2024, in the Euro 2024 qualifying play-off final, Szczęsny saved the deciding penalty from Daniel James during the shoot-out, which Poland won 5–4 against Wales after a goalless draw, sending his country through the tournament. The same year in June, Szczęsny was selected in the squad for Euro 2024. He previously hinted at retirement from international football at the end of the tournament. He appeared in Poland's opening group matches against Netherlands and Austria, both of which ended in defeat, resulting in Poland's elimination in the first round of the competition; he did not feature in the final match against France, which ended in a 1–1 draw.

== Style of play ==
During his time with Arsenal, Szczęsny earned a reputation as a tall, promising, and talented goalkeeper, who possessed significant athleticism, as well as strong reflexes, agility, shot-stopping abilities, distribution, and a good mentality, but who was also inconsistent; as such, he occasionally came under criticism in the media over technical mistakes or errors in judgement, in particular on crosses, and for his lack of development during his time with the club, as well as his lack of discipline off the pitch, including an incident in which he was reportedly fined by the club after being caught smoking in the showers.

Regarding Szczęsny's error–prone performances during his time in England, former Arsenal goalkeeper David Seaman commented in 2013 that the Polish keeper needed to become stronger mentally in order to retain his place in the first team. During his time in Italy, after producing a series of mixed performances during his first season with Roma, Szczęsny established himself as one of the best goalkeepers in Serie A during his second season with the team, and subsequently also maintained a consistently high level of performance with Juventus. In 2016, Szczęsny's former Arsenal manager Wenger labelled him a "world-class" goalkeeper. Following his move to the Turin side in 2017, Szczęsny credited the manner in which the role of the goalkeeper is prepared and coached in Italy as one of the reasons for his drastic improvement, citing his Roma manager – Spalletti – and his goalkeeping coach with the club – Guido Nanni – as figures who played a key role in his development and maturation as a goalkeeper.

In a 2017 interview with The Independent, he commented that "the goalkeeping school in Italy is very different, it's very technical and pays more attention to the details", adding that "in the two-and-a-half years since I came to Italy, I've improved massively which is thanks to the coaches and the way they work. It's not about improving when you play, it's every day in training you have to work on every aspect of your game and that's something I've really enjoyed." Regarding the general approach to training in Italy, he stated: "the coaches in Italy are much more tactical". Upon his arrival at Juventus, his teammate Buffon named him as the best goalkeeper in Serie A during the previous season, while in October of that year, he described him as being "a younger and better goalkeeper" than himself.

Szczęsny's former goalkeeping coach at Roma, Nanni, praised him in 2017 for his dedication in training, and for his ability to overcome his weaknesses and develop his all–round game, noting that he initially struggled to get to ground quickly to parry the ball and deal with low shots upon his arrival at the club, but that he improved significantly in this area under his tenure; he also lauded the keeper for his intelligence, cool demeanour, and calm composure in goal, as well as his ability with the ball at this feet. In 2020, he labelled him as one of the best goalkeepers in the world, a view which was shared by Juventus's chief football officer Fabio Paratici. During his time with Juventus, Szczęsny drew praise in the media for his decisive performances; in particular he was singled out for his reflexes, fundamental goalkeeping technique, positional sense, and consistency, as well as his efficient rather than spectacular style of goalkeeping, and his ability to handle the pressure of replacing Buffon as the team's first choice goalkeeper. However, his ability to come off his line to deal with high balls or collect crosses was still cited as an area of weakness by pundits.

== Personal life ==
During his career in England, his surname was often shortened as "Chesney" because of the difficult spelling of his family name, which most English speakers found difficult to grasp. His name had also caused problems for Arsenal supporters and was often pronounced incorrectly. Over time, he endeared himself to the Arsenal fans through his adopted London accent and down-to-earth attitude. This trend continued even after he transferred to Juventus. He is also known by the nickname "Tek". He is also well-known for his habit of smoking, which he has stated several times during media conversations while at Barcelona & Arsenal.

In 2013, he started dating Polish singer Marina Łuczenko. They got engaged in early July 2015 during her birthday party, and married on 21 May 2016. They have a son and a daughter.

== Career statistics ==
=== Club ===
As of match played 16 September 2026

Appearances and goals by club, season and competition
Club	Season	League			National cup (Note: Includes FA Cup, Coppa Italia, Copa del Rey)		League cup (Note: Includes Football League Cup)		Europe		Other		Total	
Club	Season	Division	Apps	Goals	Apps	Goals	Apps	Goals	Apps	Goals	Apps	Goals	Apps	Goals
Arsenal	2009–10	Premier League	0	0	0	0	1	0	0	0	—		1	0
Arsenal	2010–11	Premier League	15	0	2	0	5	0	2 (Note: Appearances in UEFA Champions League)	0	—		24	0
Arsenal	2011–12	Premier League	38	0	1	0	0	0	9	0	—		48	0
Arsenal	2012–13	Premier League	25	0	4	0	1	0	3	0	—		33	0
Arsenal	2013–14	Premier League	37	0	0	0	0	0	9	0	—		46	0
Arsenal	2014–15	Premier League	17	0	5	0	0	0	6	0	1 (Note: Appearance in FA Community Shield)	0	29	0
Arsenal	Total		132	0	12	0	7	0	29	0	1	0	181	0
Brentford (loan)	2009–10	League One	28	0	0	0	—		—		0	0	28	0
Roma (loan)	2015–16	Serie A	34	0	0	0	—		8	0	—		42	0
Roma (loan)	2016–17	Serie A	38	0	0	0	—		1	0	—		39	0
Roma (loan)	Total		72	0	0	0	—		9	0	—		81	0
Juventus	2017–18	Serie A	17	0	2	0	—		2	0	0	0	21	0
Juventus	2018–19	Serie A	28	0	2	0	—		10	0	1 (Note: Appearance in Supercoppa Italiana)	0	41	0
Juventus	2019–20	Serie A	29	0	0	0	—		7	0	1	0	37	0
Juventus	2020–21	Serie A	30	0	0	0	—		7	0	1	0	38	0
Juventus	2021–22	Serie A	33	0	0	0	—		7	0	0	0	40	0
Juventus	2022–23	Serie A	28	0	0	0	—		12 (Note: Four appearances in UEFA Champions League, eight appearances in UEFA Europa League)	0	—		40	0
Juventus	2023–24	Serie A	35	0	0	0	—		—		—		35	0
Juventus	Total		200	0	4	0	—		45	0	3	0	252	0
Barcelona	2024–25	La Liga	15	0	5	0	—		8	0	2 (Note: Appearances in Supercopa de España)	0	30	0
Barcelona	2025–26	La Liga	8	0	0	0	—		4	0	0	0	12	0
Barcelona	2026–27	La Liga	1	0	0	0	—		0	0	0	0	1	0
Barcelona	Total		24	0	5	0	—		12	0	2	0	43	0
Career total			456	0	21	0	7	0	95	0	6	0	585	0

=== International ===
Appearances and goals by national team and year
National team	Year	Apps	Goals
Poland	2009	1	0
Poland	2010	0	0
Poland	2011	6	0
Poland	2012	5	0
Poland	2013	4	0
Poland	2014	6	0
Poland	2015	2	0
Poland	2016	4	0
Poland	2017	4	0
Poland	2018	8	0
Poland	2019	6	0
Poland	2020	3	0
Poland	2021	13	0
Poland	2022	8	0
Poland	2023	9	0
Poland	2024	5	0
Total		84	0

== Honours ==
Arsenal

- FA Cup: 2013–14, 2014–15
- FA Community Shield: 2014
- Football League Cup runner-up: 2010–11

Juventus

- Serie A: 2017–18, 2018–19, 2019–20
- Coppa Italia: 2017–18, 2020–21, 2023–24; runner-up: 2019–20, 2021–22
- Supercoppa Italiana: 2018, 2020

Barcelona

- La Liga: 2024–25, 2025–26
- Copa del Rey: 2024–25
- Supercopa de España: 2025, 2026

Individual

- Polish Newcomer of the Year: 2011
- Premier League Golden Glove: 2013–14
- Lega Serie A Goalkeeper of the Year: 2019–20
- Serie A Team of the Season: 2022–23
