= Ederson (footballer, born 1993) =

Brazilian footballer (born 1993)

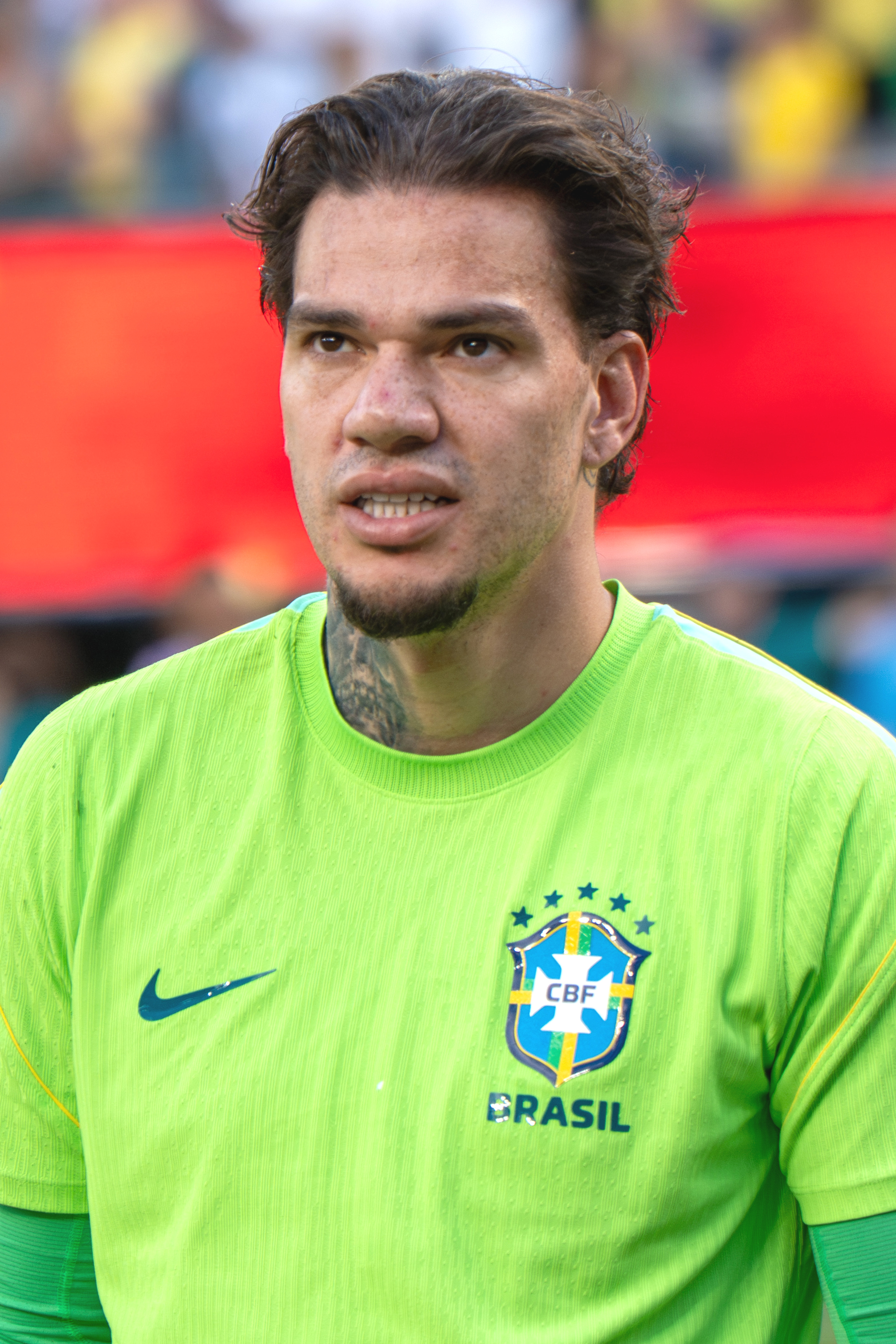
- Ederson with Brazil in 2026

Personal information
- Full name: Ederson Santana de Moraes
- Date of birth: 17 August 1993 (age 33)
- Place of birth: Osasco, Brazil
- Height: 1.88 m (6 ft 2 in)
- Position: Goalkeeper

Team information
- Current team: Fenerbahçe
- Number: 31

Youth career
- 2003–2009: São Paulo
- 2009–2011: Benfica

Senior career*
Years	Team	Apps	(Gls)
2011–2013	Ribeirão	29	(0)
2013–2015	Rio Ave	37	(0)
2015–2017	Benfica	37	(0)
2017–2025	Manchester City	276	(0)
2025–	Fenerbahçe	34	(0)

International career^{‡}
2017–	Brazil	32	(0)
Medal record
Men's football
Representing Brazil
Copa América
Winner	2019 Brazil
Runner-up	2021 Brazil
- * Club domestic league appearances and goals as of 8 November 2026 ‡ National team caps and goals as of 31 May 2026

Ederson Santana de Moraes (born 17 August 1993), known simply as Ederson, (Note: Brazilian Portuguese: [ˈɛdɛʁsõ]) is a Brazilian professional footballer who plays as a goalkeeper for Süper Lig club Fenerbahçe and the Brazil national team.

After finishing as a runner-up in the Taça de Portugal and Taça da Liga with Rio Ave in 2014, Ederson returned to Benfica in 2015. He won two Primeira Liga titles and one of each cup before signing for Manchester City for £35 million in 2017. He made 372 appearances for City, winning 18 major honours, including six Premier League titles, two FA Cups, four EFL Cups, and the Champions League in 2023, as part of a continental treble. Ederson won the Premier League Golden Glove three consecutive times between 2020 and 2022.

Ederson made his senior debut for Brazil in 2017. He was chosen in Brazil's squad for the FIFA World Cup in 2018, 2022 and 2026, and the Copa América in 2019 and 2021, winning the 2019 tournament.

== Club career ==
=== Early career ===
Born in Osasco, São Paulo, Ederson started his football career in 2008 at local club São Paulo, with whom he played one season, before joining Benfica in Portugal. He spent two years as a junior before being released in 2011 and signing for Second Division club Ribeirão.

A year later, Ederson joined Primeira Liga club Rio Ave, signing a contract until 2014 in summer 2012. In April 2015, following a series of appearances and a call-up to the Brazil under-23 squad, he signed a new contract with the club that would last until 2019.

=== Benfica ===
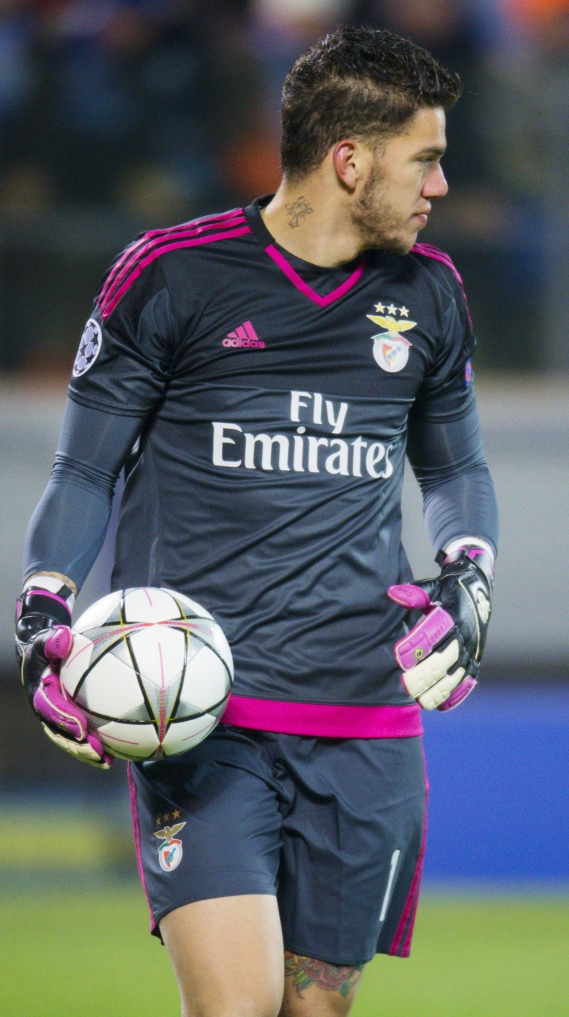
Ederson playing for Benfica against Zenit in 2016

On 27 June 2015, Ederson rejoined Portuguese champions Benfica. Then, in July, he officially signed a five-year contract with the club, in a deal worth €500,000, and set a €45 million release clause. Rio Ave would keep 50% of the upcoming keeper's economic rights. In the 2015–16 season, Ederson started as a second choice in line for the first team, defended by compatriot and international Júlio César.

Ederson first played some matches in the Segunda Liga with the reserve team and in the Taça da Liga with the main squad, before playing in the Primeira Liga on 5 March 2016 against local rivals Sporting CP, replacing injured Júlio César. Benfica won the Lisbon derby 0–1 and took the first place of Primeira Liga. He would then be part of eleven more victories that would seal Benfica's 35th league title, their third in a row. Five days later, he played the Taça da Liga final against Marítimo, which Benfica won 6–2. In addition, he played three matches in the Champions League campaign, where Benfica reached the quarter-finals. In his next season, he and Benfica won the treble of Primeira Liga, Taça de Portugal and Supertaça Cândido de Oliveira.

=== Manchester City ===
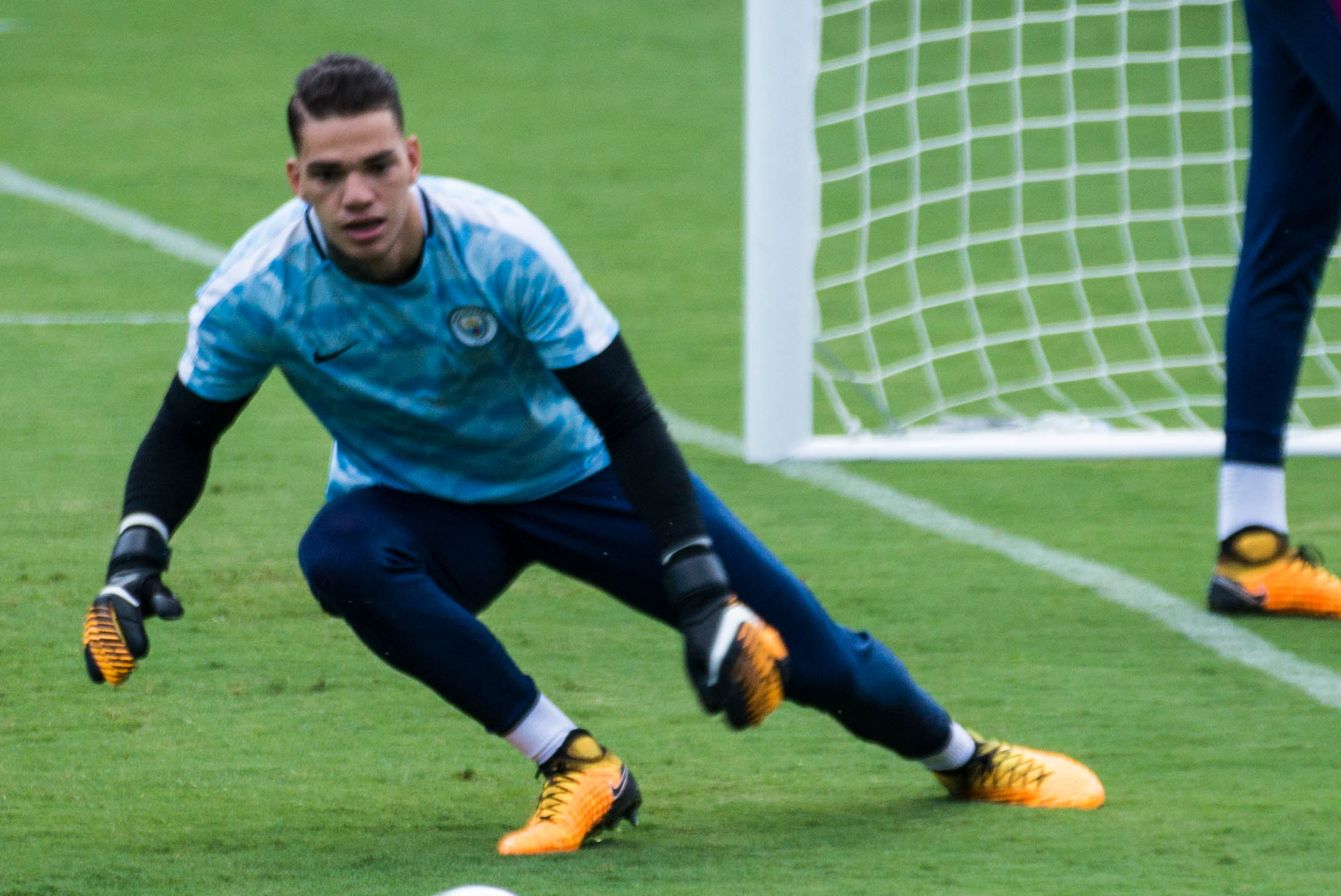
Ederson with Manchester City in 2017

On 1 June 2017, Benfica announced that Ederson had joined Premier League club Manchester City for £35 million (€40 million). At the time, the transfer made him the second-most expensive goalkeeper of all-time – currently fifth highest – after Gianluigi Buffon (£33 million), whose transfer fee, although the second highest ever in pounds sterling, still remained the highest of all time in euros (€52 million in 2001) until Alisson Becker's (€75 million in 2018) and then Kepa Arrizabalaga's (€80 million in 2018). Ederson's transfer equalled Axel Witsel's as the largest fee a club has ever paid for a Benfica player at the time.

Ederson was immediately inserted as Pep Guardiola's first choice goalkeeper, supplanting Claudio Bravo. He made his competitive debut for the club on 12 August 2017 in a 0–2 away win at Brighton & Hove Albion, where he kept a clean sheet. On 9 September against Liverpool, Ederson suffered a kick to the face by Sadio Mané, and was forced to leave the game after eight minutes of treatment. Ederson received eight stitches, and Mané was sent off by referee Jon Moss and banned for the subsequent three matches. Ederson made his next start the following week in the Champions League against Feyenoord, sporting a piece of protective headgear. Ederson believed that Mané's collision was accidental, and accepted an apology from the Liverpool player.

On 19 August 2018, Ederson became the first Manchester City goalkeeper to provide a Premier League assist, as his goal-kick was converted by Sergio Agüero for the opening goal in a 6–1 win over Huddersfield Town. In the 2019 EFL Cup final, he saved from Jorginho in a penalty shootout win over Chelsea after a goalless draw; he was again unbeaten in a 6–0 win over Watford in the 2019 FA Cup final as his team won all three major domestic trophies.

Ederson was awarded the Golden Glove for keeping the most clean sheets (16) in the 2019–20 Premier League season after a 5–0 home win against Norwich City. He retained the honour a year later with one game to spare, as Chelsea's Édouard Mendy was unable to match his tally. On 1 September 2021, he signed a new contract to last until 2026. He won the Golden Glove for the third consecutive time in 2021–22, sharing his tally of 20 with compatriot Alisson Becker of Liverpool.

On 15 January 2024, Ederson was awarded the FIFA Best Men's Goalkeeper at the FIFA Best Awards 2023 for keeping the most clean sheets (11) in the 2022–23 Premier League season, most number of saves (22) in the UEFA Champions League and being part of the City team who won the treble in 2023. Four months later, he was ruled out of the last game of the Premier League season and the 2024 FA Cup final after suffering a fractured eye socket in a collision with Cristian Romero in a win over Tottenham Hotspur.

Ederson made a total of 372 appearances across all competitions during his eight-year stay at the club, winning 18 major honours, three Premier League Golden Glove awards, and keeping 122 clean sheets in 276 league appearances, a record for a City goalkeeper.

=== Fenerbahçe ===
Ederson with Fenerbahçe in 2026

On 2 September 2025, Ederson joined Süper Lig club Fenerbahçe on a three-year contract with option for a further year. On 14 September, he made his debut with the team in a 1–0 Süper Lig victory against Trabzonspor. On 24 September, he made his continental debut with the team in a UEFA Europa League match against Dinamo Zagreb which was resulted in a 3–1 away defeat.

On 10 January 2026, Ederson won a 2–0 victory against arch rival Galatasaray with his team in 2025 Turkish Super Cup final played at the Atatürk Olympic Stadium. It also marked his second trophy at the same stadium, coming nearly two and a half years after he won the 2023 UEFA Champions League final with his former club Manchester City. A month later, on 23 February, due to injury sustained in the Süper Lig match against Kasımpaşa, he would be out for three weeks, as stated by coach Domenico Tedesco in the post-match press conference. Two months later, on 17 April, he conceded a stoppage-time equaliser in a 2–2 draw with Çaykur Rizespor, before being sent off in a 3–0 away defeat to Galatasaray on 26 April, a result that effectively ended his club's hopes of winning the league title.

== International career ==
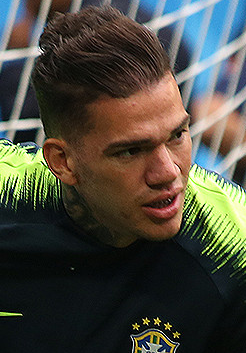
Ederson training with Brazil at the 2018 FIFA World Cup

Ederson was named in Brazil's provisional squad for Copa América Centenario but was cut from the final squad due to injury. His debut for the national team came in a 3–0 win over Chile in a 2018 World Cup qualifier on 10 October 2017. In May 2018, he was named in Tite's final 23-man squad for the World Cup in Russia. Ederson was included in Brazil's 23-man squad for the 2019 Copa América.

In June 2021, Ederson made his major tournament debut for Brazil, starting and keeping a clean sheet in a 4–0 group stage victory over Peru at the 2021 Copa América as Tite made five changes. In the quarter-finals against Chile, he was chosen at the expense of Alisson Becker, winning that match 1–0 as well as the semi-finals against Peru. On 10 July, he started in his nation's 1–0 defeat to rivals Argentina in the final.

Ederson was named in the squad for the 2022 FIFA World Cup in Qatar. He played one game for the quarter-finalists, a 1–0 loss to Cameroon in the final group game once his team had already advanced to the last 16. He was initially called up by Dorival Júnior for the 2024 Copa América, but was replaced before the tournament by Rafael after being unable to recover from a fractured eye socket.

On 18 May 2026, Ederson was selected for Brazil's squad for the 2026 FIFA World Cup.

== Style of play ==
Ederson has been described as an agile, commanding, and physically imposing keeper, who possesses both physical strength and good reflexes and shot-stopping abilities between the posts. However, he is mostly highly regarded for his distribution and skill with the ball at his feet than for his abilities as shot-stopper: his control and confidence on the ball enables him to retain possession and quickly play the ball out from the back on the ground with his hands or either foot – even when put under pressure – or launch an attack with long kicks. Although naturally left-footed, he is capable of using either foot. Regarding his distribution, former Manchester City goalkeeper Shay Given described Ederson as "the best goalkeeper in the world with his feet" in 2018; his range of passing has also led to him be described as a playmaker in the media. Ederson currently holds the record for most assists in the Premier League by a goalkeeper, with 7.

Ederson is noted for his speed in rushing off the line, often playing as a sweeper-keeper. In his youth, he was scouted for his decision making, consistency, and composure in goal. Later scouts praised his ability to organise the defence and football IQ. Kasper Schmeichel, in 2019, described him as the best goalkeeper in the Premier League.

== Personal life ==
Ederson acquired Portuguese citizenship in 2016. His body is heavily covered in tattoos, including a rose and a skull on his neck, angel wings on his back, a Portuguese League trophy on his leg, which he won for Benfica in 2016 and in 2017, and even a tattoo of 'I Belong to Jesus' which conveys his Christian faith.

On 10 May 2018, Ederson set a Guinness World Record for the longest football drop kick, reaching a distance of 75.35 metres (247 ft 2 in) at the Etihad Campus.

== Career statistics ==
=== Club ===
As of match played 8 November 2026

Appearances and goals by club, season and competition
Club	Season	League			National cup (Note: Includes Taça de Portugal, FA Cup, Turkish Cup)		League cup (Note: Includes Taça da Liga, EFL Cup)		Europe		Other		Total	
Club	Season	Division	Apps	Goals	Apps	Goals	Apps	Goals	Apps	Goals	Apps	Goals	Apps	Goals
Ribeirão	2011–12	Segunda Divisão	29	0	1	0	0	0	—		—		30	0
Rio Ave	2012–13	Primeira Liga	2	0	2	0	3	0	—		—		7	0
Rio Ave	2013–14	Primeira Liga	18	0	7	0	3	0	—		—		28	0
Rio Ave	2014–15	Primeira Liga	17	0	5	0	4	0	2 (Note: Appearances in UEFA Europa League)	0	0	0	28	0
Rio Ave	Total		37	0	14	0	10	0	2	0	0	0	63	0
Benfica B	2015–16	LigaPro	4	0	—		—		—		—		4	0
Benfica	2015–16	Primeira Liga	10	0	0	0	5	0	3 (Note: Appearances in UEFA Champions League)	0	0	0	18	0
Benfica	2016–17	Primeira Liga	27	0	3	0	3	0	7	0	0	0	38	0
Benfica	Total		37	0	3	0	8	0	10	0	0	0	56	0
Manchester City	2017–18	Premier League	36	0	0	0	0	0	9	0	—		45	0
Manchester City	2018–19	Premier League	38	0	6	0	1	0	10	0	0	0	55	0
Manchester City	2019–20	Premier League	35	0	1	0	0	0	8	0	0	0	44	0
Manchester City	2020–21	Premier League	36	0	0	0	0	0	12	0	—		48	0
Manchester City	2021–22	Premier League	37	0	1	0	0	0	11	0	0	0	49	0
Manchester City	2022–23	Premier League	35	0	1	0	0	0	11	0	1 (Note: Appearance in FA Community Shield)	0	48	0
Manchester City	2023–24	Premier League	33	0	0	0	0	0	7	0	3 (Note: One appearance in UEFA Super Cup, two appearances in FIFA Club World Cup)	0	43	0
Manchester City	2024–25	Premier League	26	0	2	0	0	0	8	0	4 (Note: One appearance in FA Community Shield, three appearances in FIFA Club World Cup)	0	40	0
Manchester City	Total		276	0	11	0	1	0	76	0	8	0	372	0
Fenerbahçe	2025–26	Süper Lig	24	0	1	0	—		9	0	2 (Note: Appearances in Turkish Super Cup)	0	36	0
Fenerbahçe	2026–27	Süper Lig	10	0	0	0	—		6	0	0	0	16	0
Fenerbahçe	Total		34	0	1	0	0	0	15	0	2	0	52	0
Career total			417	0	30	0	19	0	103	0	10	0	577	0

=== International ===
As of match played 31 May 2026

Appearances and goals by national team and year
National team	Year	Apps	Goals
Brazil	2017	1	0
Brazil	2018	2	0
Brazil	2019	6	0
Brazil	2020	2	0
Brazil	2021	6	0
Brazil	2022	2	0
Brazil	2023	6	0
Brazil	2024	4	0
Brazil	2025	1	0
Brazil	2026	2	0
Total		32	0

== Honours ==
Rio Ave

- Taça de Portugal runner-up: 2013–14
- Taça da Liga runner-up: 2013–14

Benfica

- Primeira Liga: 2015–16, 2016–17
- Taça de Portugal: 2016–17
- Taça da Liga: 2015–16

Manchester City

- Premier League: 2017–18, 2018–19, 2020–21, 2021–22, 2022–23, 2023–24
- FA Cup: 2018–19, 2022–23; runner-up: 2024–25
- EFL Cup: 2017–18, 2018–19, 2019–20, 2020–21
- FA Community Shield: 2018, 2019, 2024
- UEFA Champions League: 2022–23; runner-up: 2020–21
- UEFA Super Cup: 2023
- FIFA Club World Cup: 2023

Fenerbahçe

- Turkish Super Cup: 2025
- Süper Lig: runner-up: 2025–26

Brazil

- Copa América: 2019; runner-up: 2021

Individual

- O Jogo Team of the Year: 2016
- SJPF Primeira Liga Team of the Year: 2016
- LPFP Primeira Liga Goalkeeper of the Year: 2016–17
- UEFA Champions League Breakthrough XI: 2017
- Guinness World Record for the longest football drop kick: 2018
- PFA Premier League Team of the Year: 2018–19, 2020–21
- Premier League Golden Glove: 2019–20, 2020–21, 2021–22
- UEFA Champions League Squad of the Season: 2020–21
- IFFHS World's Best Goalkeeper: 2023
- IFFHS Men's World Team: 2023
- IFFHS Men's CONMEBOL Team: 2023
- The Best FIFA Goalkeeper: 2023
- Globe Soccer Awards Best Goalkeeper: 2023
- FIFPRO Men's World 11: 2024
