= Nikolaj Kirk =

Danish footballer (born 1998)

Personal information
- Full name: Nikolaj Hammelsvang Kirk
- Date of birth: 19 March 1998 (age 28)
- Place of birth: Grønbjerg, Denmark
- Height: 1.80 m (5 ft 11 in)
- Positions: Central midfielder; full back

Youth career
- Grønbjerg IF
- Spjald IF
- –2013: Vildbjerg SF
- 2013–2016: FC Midtjylland

Senior career*
Years	Team	Apps	(Gls)
2016–2020	FC Midtjylland	0	(0)
2017–2018	→ Brentford (loan)	0	(0)
2018–2019	→ Brentford (loan)	0	(0)
2019	→ Stabæk (loan)	4	(0)
2019	→ Stabæk 2 (loan)	5	(0)
2019–2020	→ FC Fredericia (loan)	9	(2)
2020–2023	Aarhus Fremad	34	(3)
2023–2024	Odder IGF	5	(0)

International career
2014	Denmark U16	5	(0)
2014–2015	Denmark U17	9	(0)
2015–2016	Denmark U18	4	(0)
- * Club domestic league appearances and goals as of 11:47, 11 August 2024 (UTC)

Nikolaj Hammelsvang Kirk (born 19 March 1998) is a Danish professional footballer who plays as a central midfielder or full back. He is a product of the FC Midtjylland academy and played professional football for Brentford, Stabæk and FC Fredericia while on loan from the club. After his release in 2020, Kirk dropped into Danish amateur football. He represented Denmark at youth level.

== Club career ==
=== FC Midtjylland and loans ===
A central midfielder, Kirk began his career with spells at Grønbjerg IF, Spjald IF and Vildbjerg SF, before joining the academy at Superliga club FC Midtjylland in 2013. He progressed to sign a five-year professional contract in September 2016 and spent the 2017–18, 2018–19 and 2019–20 seasons away on loan. Kirk transferred out of the club in August 2020.

On 22 June 2017, Kirk joined the B team at Championship club Brentford on loan for the duration of the 2017–18 season. He made 34 appearances, scored one goal and rejoined the club on loan for the 2018–19 season. Kirk captained the B team and played as a utility player in defence and midfield during the campaign. He won his maiden call into the first team squad for an FA Cup fifth round match versus Swansea City on 17 February 2019 and made the first senior appearance of his career as a substitute for Saïd Benrahma after 69 minutes of the 4–1 defeat. Kirk's loan was terminated in March 2019, by which time he had made 71 appearances for Brentford B.

On 31 March 2019, Kirk joined Norwegian Eliteserien club Stabæk on loan until 25 July 2019. He made 11 appearances for the first and reserve teams before the loan was terminated early.

On 20 July 2019, Kirk joined Danish 1st Division club FC Fredericia on a loan which was later extended until the end of the 2019–20 season. He made 11 appearances and scored two goals during his spell.

=== Lower-league football ===
On 5 August 2020, Kirk signed a two-year contract with Danish 2nd Division club Aarhus Fremad. He made 22 appearances and scored 2 goals during the 2020–21 season, but missed the entire 2021–22 season due to an achilles injury. Kirk returned to make 13 appearances and score one goal during the 2022–23 season. He made concurrent Denmark Series and Jutland Series appearances for Odder IGF during the 2023–24 season.

== International career ==
Kirk was capped by Denmark between U16 and U18 level.

== Career statistics ==
As of match played 15 June 2024

Appearances and goals by club, season and competition
Club	Season	League			National cup (Note: Includes FA Cup, Norwegian Cup, Danish Cup)		League cup (Note: Includes EFL Cup)		Other		Total	
Club	Season	Division	Apps	Goals	Apps	Goals	Apps	Goals	Apps	Goals	Apps	Goals
Brentford (loan)	2018–19	Championship	0	0	1	0	0	0	—		1	0
Stabæk (loan)	2019	Eliteserien	4	0	2	0	—		—		6	0
Stabæk II (loan)	2019	Norwegian Third Division	5	0	—		—		—		5	0
FC Fredericia (loan)	2019–20	Danish 1st Division	9	2	2	0	—		—		11	2
Aarhus Fremad	2020–21	Danish 2nd Division Group 1	21	2	1	0	—		—		22	2
Aarhus Fremad	2022–23	Danish 2nd Division	13	1	0	0	—		—		13	1
Aarhus Fremad	Total		34	3	1	0	—		—		35	3
Odder IGF	2023–24	Denmark Series Group 4	5	0	1	0	—		0	0	0	0
Odder IGF	2023–24	Jutland Series Group 2	4	1	—		—		—		4	1
Career total			61	6	7	0	0	0	0	0	68	6
