= 2019–20 Brentford F.C. season =

English football team season

Brentford
2019–20 season
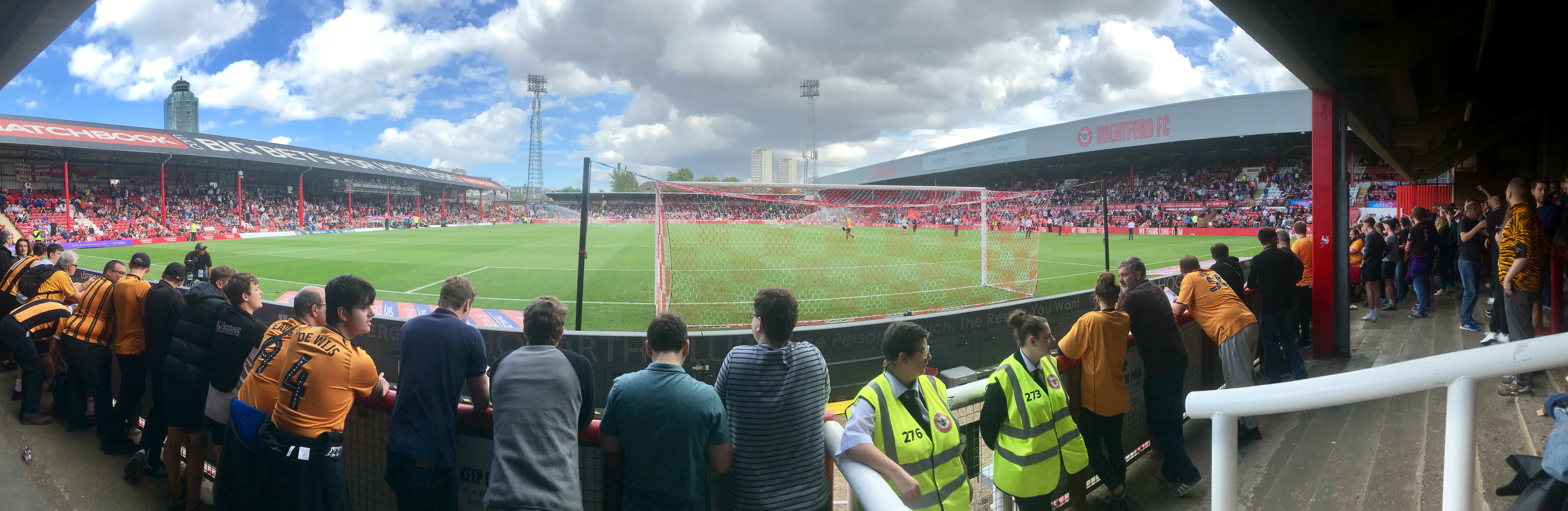
- Owner: Matthew Benham
- Chairman: Cliff Crown
- Head coach: Thomas Frank
- Stadium: Griffin Park
- Championship: 3rd
- Play-offs: Runners-up
- FA Cup: Fourth round
- EFL Cup: First round
- Top goalscorer: League: Ollie Watkins (25); All: Ollie Watkins (26)
- Average home league attendance: 9,156
Home colours	Away colours	Third colours

The 2019–20 season was Brentford's 130th year in existence and sixth consecutive season in the Championship. Along with competing in the Championship, the club also participated in the FA Cup and the EFL Cup. This was the club's final season at Griffin Park, their home for 116 years.

The season covered the period from 1 July 2019 to 4 August 2020.

== Transfers ==
=== Transfers in ===
Date	Position	Nationality	Name	From	Fee	Ref.
1 July 2019 (Note: Nørgaard's transfer was announced on 28 May 2019 and his contract commenced on 1 July 2019.)	DM	(Denmark)	Christian Nørgaard	(Italy) Fiorentina	Undisclosed	
1 July 2019 (Note: O'Connor's transfer was announced on 22 May 2019 and his contract commenced on 1 July 2019.)	CB	(Scotland)	Kane O'Connor	(Scotland) Hibernian	Undisclosed	
1 July 2019 (Note: Shepperd's transfer was announced on 21 June 2019 and his contract commenced on 1 July 2019.)	GK	(Wales)	Nathan Shepperd	(Wales) Swansea City	Free transfer	
2 July 2019	DM	(France)	Julien Carré	(England) Brighton & Hove Albion	Free transfer	
2 July 2019	CB	(Jamaica)	Ethan Pinnock	(England) Barnsley	Undisclosed	
5 July 2019	GK	(Spain)	David Raya	(England) Blackburn Rovers	Undisclosed	
8 July 2019	CB	(Sweden)	Pontus Jansson	(England) Leeds United	Undisclosed	
10 July 2019	CM	(Denmark)	Mathias Jensen	(Spain) Celta Vigo	Undisclosed	
12 July 2019	AM	(England)	Arthur Read	(England) Luton Town	Compensation	
19 July 2019	LW	(Wales)	Joe Adams	(England) Bury	Undisclosed	
31 July 2019	AM	(Ecuador)	Joel Valencia	(Poland) Piast Gliwice	Undisclosed	
5 August 2019	W	(France)	Bryan Mbeumo	(France) Troyes AC	Undisclosed	
5 August 2019	CM	(England)	Dru Yearwood	(England) Southend United	Undisclosed	
6 August 2019	RB	(Denmark)	Mads Roerslev	(Denmark) Copenhagen	Undisclosed	
8 August 2019	LB	(England)	Dominic Thompson	(England) Arsenal	Nominal fee	
22 August 2019	CF	(Greece)	Nikos Karelis	(Belgium) KRC Genk	Free transfer	
2 September 2019	DF	(France)	Aubrel Koutsimouka	(France) Quevilly-Rouen	Free transfer	
1 January 2020	CF	(Turkey)	Halil Dervişoğlu	(Netherlands) Sparta Rotterdam	Undisclosed	
16 January 2020	CM	(England)	Paris Maghoma	(England) Tottenham Hotspur	Undisclosed	
29 January 2020	CF	(Scotland)	Aaron Pressley	(England) Aston Villa	Undisclosed	
31 January 2020	CM	(Grenada)	Shandon Baptiste	(England) Oxford United	Undisclosed	
31 January 2020	LW	(Ghana)	Tariqe Fosu	(England) Oxford United	Undisclosed	

=== Loans in ===
Date from	Position	Nationality	Name	From	Date until	Ref.
1 July 2019	RM	(Denmark)	Christian Tue Jensen	(Denmark) FC Midtjylland	30 June 2020	
1 July 2019	CB	(Denmark)	Japhet Sery Larsen	(Denmark) FC Midtjylland	30 June 2020	

=== Loans out ===
Date from	Position	Nationality	Name	To	Date until	Ref.
29 July 2019	CF	(Denmark)	Justin Shaibu	(England) Boreham Wood	30 June 2020	
1 August 2019	CM	(Republic of Ireland)	Canice Carroll	(England) Carlisle United	31 January 2020	
2 September 2019	GK	(England)	Ellery Balcombe	(Denmark) Viborg	20 January 2020	
2 September 2019	CM	(England)	Reece Cole	(Scotland) Partick Thistle	31 December 2019	
2 September 2019	CF	(Finland)	Marcus Forss	(England) AFC Wimbledon	30 June 2020	
2 September 2019	LW	(Denmark)	Emiliano Marcondes	(Denmark) FC Midtjylland	31 December 2019	
25 October 2019	LW	(England)	Jaden Brissett	(England) Maidenhead United	25 November 2019	
23 November 2019	MF	(England)	Jayden Onen	(England) Bromley	23 December 2019	
9 January 2020	CB	(Denmark)	Mads Bech Sørensen	(England) AFC Wimbledon	30 June 2020	
20 February 2020	GK	(Iceland)	Patrik Gunnarsson	(England) Southend United	15 March 2020	

=== Transfers out ===
Date	Position	Nationality	Name	To	Fee	Ref.
1 July 2019	GK	(England)	Dan Bentley	(England) Bristol City	Undisclosed	
1 July 2019	DF	(France)	Yoann Barbet	(England) Queens Park Rangers	Free transfer	
1 July 2019	GK	(Republic of Ireland)	Jack Bonham	(England) Gillingham	Free transfer	
7 July 2019	MF	(England)	Josh McEachran	(England) Birmingham City	Free transfer	
7 July 2019	MF	(Scotland)	Lewis Macleod	(England) Wigan Athletic	Free transfer	
7 July 2019	DF	(England)	Moses Odubajo	(England) Sheffield Wednesday	Free transfer	
11 July 2019	SS	(Sweden)	Henrik Johansson	(Sweden) Trelleborg	Free transfer	
11 July 2019	CB	(England)	Ezri Konsa	(England) Aston Villa	£12,000,000	
27 July 2019	AM	(Saint Kitts and Nevis)	Romaine Sawyers	(England) West Bromwich Albion	£3,000,000	
30 July 2019	LM	(Scotland)	Theo Archibald	(England) Macclesfield Town	Free transfer	
5 August 2019	CF	(France)	Neal Maupay	(England) Brighton & Hove Albion	Undisclosed	
20 August 2019	CM	(Iceland)	Kolbeinn Finnsson	(Germany) Borussia Dortmund II	Undisclosed	
29 August 2019	LW	(Republic of Ireland)	Chiedozie Ogbene	(England) Rotherham United	Undisclosed	
5 January 2020	FW	(England)	Joe Hardy	(England) Liverpool	Undisclosed	
24 January 2020	CM	(Scotland)	Ali Coote	(Republic of Ireland) Waterford	Undisclosed	
31 January 2020	CM	(Republic of Ireland)	Canice Carroll	(England) Stevenage	Undisclosed	
31 January 2020	RB	(England)	Josh Clarke	Free agent	Mutual consent	
31 January 2020	LB	(Republic of Ireland)	Tom Field	(Scotland) Dundee	Undisclosed	

== Pre-season and friendlies ==
5 July 2019 Friendly	AFC Wimbledon	0–3	Brentford	Norbiton
19:45 BST		Report	Nightingale 56' (o.g.); Nørgaard 82'; Watkins 84'	Stadium: Kingsmeadow

13 July 2019 Friendly	Dynamo Kyiv	0–0	Brentford	Jenbach, Austria
12:00 CET		Report		Stadium: Stadion Jenbach

20 July 2019 Friendly	Wycombe Wanderers	2–2	Brentford	High Wycombe
15:00 BST	Trialist 7'; Akinfenwa 28'	Report	Hammar 36'; Marcondes 56'	Stadium: Adams Park

24 July 2019 Friendly	Norwich City	1–3	Brentford	Norwich
12:00 BST	Buendía 9'	Report	Marcondes 11'; Watkins 69'; Pinnock 78'	Stadium: Colney Training Ground

27 July 2019 Friendly	Brentford	1–3	Bournemouth	Brentford
15:00 BST	Forss 87'	Report	Solanke 31'; Ibe 70'; Surridge 77'	Stadium: Griffin Park

4 September 2019 Friendly	Swindon Town	0–1	Brentford	Swindon
		Report	Tue Jensen 84'	Stadium: County Ground; Attendance: 0

14 October 2019 Friendly	Southampton XI	4–0	Brentford	Marchwood
	Ings; Adams; Vestergaard; Long	Report		Stadium: Staplewood Campus; Attendance: 0

10 June 2020 Friendly	Arsenal	2–3	Brentford	Holloway, London
15:00 BST	Willock 40'; Lacazette 77'	Report	Fosu 73'; Dervişoğlu 80'; Baptiste 88'	Stadium: Emirates Stadium

13 June 2020 Friendly	Watford	2–0	Brentford	Watford
12:30 BST	Capoue 33'; Sarr 90'	Report		Stadium: Vicarage Road

16 June 2020 Friendly	Luton Town	4–2	Brentford	Luton
	Collins; McManaman; Hylton; Bolton	Report	Dervişoğlu; Fosu	Stadium: Kenilworth Road

21 June 2020 Friendly	Brentford	1–1	Portsmouth	Brentford
	Dervişoğlu (pen.), 50'	Report	Harness 15'	Stadium: Griffin Park

== Competitions ==
=== League table ===
Pos	Team	Pld	W	D	L	GF	GA	GD	Pts	Promotion, qualification or relegation
1	Leeds United (C, P)	46	28	9	9	77	35	+42	93	Promotion to the Premier League
2	West Bromwich Albion (P)	46	22	17	7	77	45	+32	83	Promotion to the Premier League
3	Brentford	46	24	9	13	80	38	+42	81	Qualification for Championship play-offs (Note: Four teams play for one spot and promotion to the Premier League.)
4	Fulham (O, P)	46	23	12	11	64	48	+16	81	Qualification for Championship play-offs
5	Cardiff City	46	19	16	11	68	58	+10	73	Qualification for Championship play-offs
6	Swansea City	46	18	16	12	62	53	+9	70	Qualification for Championship play-offs

Source: EFL Official Website
Rules for classification: 1) Points; 2) Goal difference; 3) Number of goals scored; 4) Head-to-head results; 5) Wins; 6) Away goals; 7) Penalty points (sec 9.5); 8) 12-point sending off offences
(C) Champions; (O) Play-off winners; (P) Promoted

==== Results summary ====
Overall								Home						Away					
Pld	W	D	L	GF	GA	GD	Pts	W	D	L	GF	GA	GD	W	D	L	GF	GA	GD
46	24	9	13	80	38	+42	81	14	5	4	44	18	+26	10	4	9	36	20	+16

Last updated: 22 July 2020.
Source: Sports Mole

==== Result by matchday ====
Round	1	2	3	4	5	6	7	8	9	10	11	12	13	14	15	16	17	18	19	20	21	22	23	24	25	26	27	28	29	30	31	32	33	34	35	36	37	38	39	40	41	42	43	44	45	46
Ground	H	A	H	A	A	H	A	H	A	H	A	H	A	A	H	A	H	A	H	A	H	H	A	H	A	A	H	A	H	A	H	H	A	H	A	A	H	A	H	A	H	H	A	H	A	H
Result	L	W	D	L	L	W	L	D	W	D	L	W	W	W	L	W	W	L	W	L	W	W	D	W	L	W	W	D	L	W	W	D	D	D	L	D	W	W	W	W	W	W	W	W	L	L
Position	21	14	12	16	19	14	18	17	14	15	17	13	12	12	13	9	8	8	7	9	7	4	6	3	4	3	3	4	5	5	5	4	4	4	5	5	4	4	3	3	3	3	3	3	3	3

Updated to match(es) played on 22 July 2020. Source: Soccerbase
A = Away; H = Home; W = Win; D = Draw; L = Loss

==== Matches ====
3 August 2019 1	Brentford	0–1	Birmingham City	Brentford
15:00 BST	Jensen (yellow card) 86'	Report	Pedersen 18'; Gardner (yellow card) 29'; Crowley (yellow card) 56'; Harding (yellow card) 90+2'	Stadium: Griffin Park; Attendance: 11,332; Referee: Gavin Ward

10 August 2019 2	Middlesbrough	0–1	Brentford	Middlesbrough
15:00 BST		Report	Watkins 54'; Dalsgaard (yellow card) 82'	Stadium: Riverside Stadium; Attendance: 21,911; Referee: Stephen Martin

17 August 2019 3	Brentford	1–1	Hull City	Brentford
15:00 BST	Watkins 72'; Jeanvier (yellow card) 83'	Report	Bowen 53'; Burke (yellow card) 64'	Stadium: Griffin Park; Attendance: 11,000; Referee: Darren England

21 August 2019 4	Leeds United	1–0	Brentford	Leeds
19:45 BST	Alioski (yellow card) 35'; Dallas (yellow card) 63'; Nketiah 81'	Report	Nørgaard (yellow card) 39'	Stadium: Elland Road; Attendance: 35,004; Referee: Andy Davies

24 August 2019 5	Charlton Athletic	1–0	Brentford	Charlton
15:00 BST	Gallagher 41'; Phillips (yellow card) 88'	Report	Henry (yellow card) 45+3'; Dalsgaard (yellow card) 76'; Canós (yellow card) 90+5'	Stadium: The Valley; Attendance: 16,771; Referee: Tim Robinson

31 August 2019 6	Brentford	3–0	Derby County	Derby County
15:00 BST	Mbeumo 17'; Watkins 18', 45'	Report	Waghorn (yellow card) 45+2'; Lawrence (yellow card) 84'	Stadium: Griffin Park; Attendance: 11,055; Referee: David Webb

14 September 2019 7	Preston North End	2–0	Brentford	Preston
15:00 BST	Maguire 4'; Fisher (yellow card) 60'; Barkhuizen 70'; Johnson (yellow card) 78'	Report	Nørgaard (yellow card) 78'	Stadium: Deepdale; Attendance: 12,873; Referee: David Coote

21 September 2019 8	Brentford	0–0	Stoke City	Brentford
15:00 BST	Benrahma (yellow card) 79'	Report	Gregory (yellow card) 22'; McClean (yellow card) 82'	Stadium: Griffin Park; Attendance: 11,870; Referee: Andy Woolmer

29 September 2019 9	Barnsley	1–3	Brentford	Barnsley
13:30 BST	Woodrow 1'	Report	Watkins 35', 46', 68'	Stadium: Oakwell; Attendance: 12,188; Referee: David Webb
Note: Live on Sky Sports

2 October 2019 10	Brentford	1–1	Bristol City	Brentford
19:45 BST	Dasilva 64'; Canós (yellow card) 81'	Report	Hunt (yellow card) 81'; Weimann 87'	Stadium: Griffin Park; Attendance: 11,433; Referee: Oliver Langford

5 October 2019 11	Nottingham Forest	1–0	Brentford	West Bridgford
15:00 BST	Watson 56'	Report	Canós (yellow card) 35'	Stadium: City Ground; Attendance: 27,598; Referee: Dean Whitestone

19 October 2019 12	Brentford	3–2	Millwall	Brentford
15:00 BST	Watkins (penalty missed) 24' (yellow card) 54' (goal) 90+4'; Mbeumo (yellow card) 63' (goal) 88'; Da Silva 84'; Jeanvier (yellow card) 90+3'	Report	Hutchinson (yellow card) 23'; M. Wallace (yellow card) 33'; Bradshaw 45+4'; J. Wallace 55' (pen.) (yellow card) 90+1'; Molumby (yellow card) 64'; Thompson (yellow card) 90+3'; Romeo (yellow card) 90+7'	Stadium: Griffin Park; Attendance: 10,886; Referee: Stuart Attwell

22 October 2019 13	Swansea City	0–3	Brentford	Swansea
19:45 BST	Roberts (yellow card) 71' van der Hoorn (yellow card) 83'	Report	Benrahma 30'; Bidwell 36' (o.g.); Mbeumo 56'; Jansson (yellow card) 85'	Stadium: Liberty Stadium; Attendance: 15,875; Referee: Gavin Ward

28 October 2019 14	Queens Park Rangers	1–3	Brentford	Shepherd's Bush
19:45 GMT	Hall 48'	Report	Watkins 23', 90+4'; Nørgaard (yellow card) 46'; Henry (yellow card) 57'; Benrahma 60' (pen.)	Stadium: Loftus Road; Attendance: 15,562; Referee: Andy Woolmer

2 November 2019 15	Brentford	0–1	Huddersfield Town	Brentford
15:00 GMT	Nørgaard (yellow card) 59'	Report	Kachunga (yellow card) 55'; Ahearne-Grant 62'; Hogg (yellow card) 64'; Simpson (yellow card) 87'; Diakhaby (yellow card) 89'; Elphick (yellow card) 90+2'	Stadium: Griffin Park; Attendance: 11,727; Referee: Robert Jones

9 November 2019 16	Wigan Athletic	0–3	Brentford	Wigan
15:00 GMT	Kipré (yellow card) 56' (yellow-red card) 73'; Williams (yellow card) 90+7'	Report	Mbeumo 5'; Nørgaard (yellow card) 58'; Mokotjo 70'; Dasilva 83'; Jeanvier (red card) 90+7'	Stadium: DW Stadium; Attendance: 9,260; Referee: Andy Davies

23 November 2019 17	Brentford	1–0	Reading	Brentford
15:00 GMT	Jansson (yellow card) 9'; Watkins 62'; Dasilva (yellow card) 78'; Jensen (yellow card) 82'	Report	Yiadom (yellow card) 4'; Swift (yellow card) 29'; Méïté (yellow card) 79'	Stadium: Griffin Park; Attendance: 11,892; Referee: David Coote

27 November 2019 18	Blackburn Rovers	1–0	Brentford	Blackburn
19:45 GMT	Dack 11' (yellow card) 44'; Evans (yellow card) 79'	Report	Roerslev (yellow card) 90+1'	Stadium: Ewood Park; Attendance: 11,401; Referee: Matthew Donohue

30 November 2019 19	Brentford	7–0	Luton Town	Brentford
15:00 GMT	Mbeumo 6'; Watkins 29'; Jensen 33'; Dasilva 40', 45+3', 87' (pen.); Benrahma 71' (pen.)	Report		Stadium: Griffin Park; Attendance: 11,287; Referee: Tony Harrington

7 December 2019 20	Sheffield Wednesday	2–1	Brentford	Owlerton, Sheffield
15:00 GMT	Fletcher 69' (pen.), 73' (yellow card) 73'	Report	Mbeumo 29'; Henry (yellow card) 68'; Pinnock (yellow card) 82'	Stadium: Hillsborough; Attendance: 22,475; Referee: Dean Whitestone

11 December 2019 21	Brentford	2–1	Cardiff City	Brentford
19:45 GMT	Mbeumo 25'; Watkins 46'; Jansson (yellow card) 76'; Henry (yellow card) 80'	Report	Pack 64'; Murphy (yellow card) 70'; Bennett (yellow card) 83'	Stadium: Griffin Park; Attendance: 10,417; Referee: John Brooks

14 December 2019 22	Brentford	1–0	Fulham	Brentford
15:00 GMT	Mbeumo 22'; Dalsgaard (yellow card) 65'	Report	Bryan (yellow card) 12'	Stadium: Griffin Park; Attendance: 12,305; Referee: Oliver Langford

21 December 2019 23	West Bromwich Albion	1–1	Brentford	West Bromwich
15.00 BST	Furlong 45+1'; Livermore (yellow card) 56'; Ferguson (yellow card) 76'	Report	Mbeumo (yellow card) 37'; Dalsgaard 43'	Stadium: The Hawthorns; Attendance: 24,961; Referee: Darren Bond

26 December 2019 24	Brentford	3–1	Swansea City	Brentford
15:00 GMT	Mbeumo 20'; Watkins 25', 88'	Report	Ayew 65'; Wilmot (yellow card) 71'; Grimes (yellow card) 74'	Stadium: Griffin Park; Attendance: 11,848; Referee: Andy Woolmer

29 December 2019 25	Millwall	1–0	Brentford	Bermondsey
15:00 GMT	O'Brien 8'; J. Wallace (yellow card) 23'; M. Wallace (yellow card) 51'; Williams (yellow card) 70'	Report	Benrahma (yellow card) 45+2'	Stadium: The Den; Attendance: 15,464; Referee: Robert Jones

1 January 2020 26	Bristol City	0–4	Brentford	Ashton Gate
15:00 GMT	Williams (yellow card) 11' (yellow-red card) 13'; Dasilva (yellow card) 54'; Weimann (yellow card) 58'	Report	Mbeumo 6'; Watkins (yellow card) 11' (goal) 82', 90'; Benrahma 26'; Henry (yellow card) 61'	Stadium: Ashton Gate Stadium; Attendance: 20,858; Referee: Matt Donohue

11 January 2020 27	Brentford	3–1	Queens Park Rangers	Brentford
12:30 GMT	Benrahma 19'; Mbeumo 23'; Watkins 33'	Report	Hall (yellow card) 46'; Kane (yellow card) 56'; Wells 62'; Cameron (yellow card) 71'; Osayi-Samuel (yellow card) 90'; Manning (yellow card) 90+2'	Stadium: Griffin Park; Attendance: 12,324; Referee: John Brooks

18 January 2020 28	Huddersfield Town	0–0	Brentford	Huddersfield
15:00 GMT	Schindler (yellow card) 87'	Report		Stadium: Kirklees Stadium; Attendance: 20,874; Referee: Oliver Langford

28 January 2020 29	Brentford	0–1	Nottingham Forest	Brentford
19:45 GMT	Benrahma (yellow card) 39'	Report	Lolley 14'; Samba (yellow card) 23'	Stadium: Griffin Park; Attendance: 12,274; Referee: Tim Robinson

1 February 2020 30	Hull City	1–5	Brentford	Kingston upon Hull
12:30 GMT	Tafazolli 29'	Report	Benrahma 12', 63', 85' (yellow card) 13'; Burke 20' (o.g.); Watkins 58'	Stadium: KCOM Stadium; Attendance: 10,034; Referee: Darren Bond

8 February 2020 31	Brentford	3–2	Middlesbrough	Brentford
15:00 GMT	Jeanvier 24'; Mbeumo 60'; Watkins 87'	Report	Wing 58'; Fletcher 63'; Tavernier (yellow card) 68'	Stadium: Griffin Park; Attendance: 12,285; Referee: Peter Bankes

11 February 2020 32	Brentford	1–1	Leeds United	Brentford
19:45 GMT	Benrahma 25'	Report	Cooper 38'	Stadium: Griffin Park; Attendance: 12,294; Referee: Robert Jones

15 February 2020 33	Birmingham City	1–1	Brentford	Bordesley
15:00 GMT	Jutkiewicz 13'; Colin (yellow card) 58'; Clarke-Salter (yellow card) 60'	Report	Pinnock 17'; Yearwood (yellow card) 34'; Dalsgaard (yellow card) 41'; Nørgaard (yellow card) 85'	Stadium: St Andrew's; Attendance: 20,379; Referee: Stephen Martin

22 February 2020 34	Brentford	2–2	Blackburn Rovers	Brentford
12:30 GMT	Watkins 62'; Benrahma 71' (pen.); Mbeumo (yellow card) 81'	Report	Armstrong 11', 54' (pen.)	Stadium: Griffin Park; Attendance: 12,082; Referee: Tim Robinson

25 February 2020 35	Luton Town	2–1	Brentford	Luton
19:45 GMT	Baptiste 9' (o.g.); Rea (yellow card) 27'; Cranie 45+2'; Potts (yellow card) 90+5'	Report	Nørgaard (yellow card) 25'; Watkins 83'	Stadium: Kenilworth Road; Attendance: 10,008; Referee: Darren England

29 February 2020 36	Cardiff City	2–2	Brentford	Cardiff
15:00 GMT	Adomah (yellow card) 23'; Hoilett 34' (yellow card) 75'; Ralls 45+1'; Bacuna (yellow card) 52'; Vaulks (yellow card) 81'	Report	Racic 5'; Mbeumo 21'; Baptiste (yellow card) 85'	Stadium: Cardiff City Stadium; Attendance: 22,393; Referee: Simon Hooper

7 March 2020 37	Brentford	5–0	Sheffield Wednesday	Brentford
15:00 GMT	Dasilva 10', 73'; Marcondes 18'; Mbeumo 40'; Fosu 82'	Report	Bannan (yellow card) 35'; Fletcher (yellow card) 50'	Stadium: Griffin Park; Attendance: 12,273; Referee: Keith Stroud

20 June 2020 38	Fulham	0–2	Brentford	Fulham
12:30 BST	Arter (yellow card) 90'	Report	Dasilva (yellow card) 37'; Benrahma 88'; Marcondes (yellow card) 90', (goal) 90+1'	Stadium: Craven Cottage; Attendance: 0 Referee: James Linington
Note: Season was suspended until 3 April 2020, due to the COVID-19 pandemic. The match was rescheduled to 20 June.

26 June 2020 39	Brentford	1–0	West Bromwich Albion	Brentford
19:45 BST	Watkins 16'; Nørgaard (yellow card) 45+2'; Marcondes (yellow card) 55'	Report	Sawyers (yellow card) 55'	Stadium: Griffin Park; Attendance: 0 Referee: Keith Stroud
Note: Season was suspended until 3 April 2020, due to the COVID-19 pandemic. The match was rescheduled to 26 June.

30 June 2020 40	Reading	0–3	Brentford	Reading
18:00 BST		Report	Mbeumo 23'; Dasilva 64'; Jansson (yellow card) 67'; Valencia 90'	Stadium: Madejski Stadium; Attendance: 0 Referee: Dean Whitestone
Note: Season was suspended until 3 April 2020, due to the COVID-19 pandemic. The match was rescheduled to 30 June.

4 July 2020 41	Brentford	3–0	Wigan Athletic	Brentford
15:00 BST	Benrahma 19', 57', 66'	Report	Robinson (yellow card) 59'; Garner (red card) 81'	Stadium: Griffin Park; Attendance: 0 Referee: Matt Donohue
Note: On 3 April, the English Football League decided to postpone all football until safe to do so due to the COVID-19 pandemic. The match was rescheduled to 4 July.

7 July 2020 42	Brentford	2–1	Charlton Athletic	Brentford
18:00 BST	Benrahma 75' (pen.); Pinnock 85'; Dervişoğlu (yellow card) 87'	Report	Bonne 8'; Cullen (yellow card) 90'	Stadium: Griffin Park; Attendance: 0 Referee: John Brooks
Note: On 3 April, the English Football League decided to postpone all football until safe to do so due to the COVID-19 pandemic. The match was rescheduled to 7 July.

11 July 2020 43	Derby County	1–3	Brentford	Derby
15:00 BST	Knight 29', (yellow card) 62'	Report	Watkins 3'; Benrahma 49', 64'	Stadium: Pride Park Stadium; Attendance: 0 Referee: Tim Robinson
Note: On 3 April, the English Football League decided to postpone all football until safe to do so due to the COVID-19 pandemic. The match was rescheduled to 11 July.

15 July 2020 44	Brentford	1–0	Preston North End	Brentford
17:00 BST	Watkins 4', (yellow card) 90+3'; Benrahma (yellow card) 63'	Report	Rafferty (yellow card) 53'	Stadium: Griffin Park; Attendance: 0 Referee: Darren England
Note: On 3 April, the English Football League decided to postpone all football until safe to do so due to the COVID-19 pandemic. The match was rescheduled to 15 July.

18 July 2020 45	Stoke City	1–0	Brentford	Stoke-on-Trent
12:30 BST	Gregory 38'; Campbell (yellow card) 74'; McClean (yellow card) 90+3'	Report		Stadium: Bet365 Stadium; Attendance: 0 Referee: Geoff Eltringham
Note: On 3 April, the English Football League decided to postpone all football until safe to do so due to the COVID-19 pandemic. The match was rescheduled to 18 July.

22 July 2020 46	Brentford	1–2	Barnsley	Brentford
19:30 BST	Dasilva 73'; Nørgaard (yellow card) 79'; Jansson (yellow card) 85'	Report	Styles 41'; Williams (yellow card) 55'; Sollbauer (yellow card) 75'; Oduor 90+1'	Stadium: Griffin Park; Attendance: 0 Referee: Robert Jones
Note: On 3 April, the English Football League decided to postpone all football until safe to do so due to the COVID-19 pandemic. The match was rescheduled to 22 July.

==== Play-offs ====
26 July 2020 Semi-final 1st leg	Swansea City	1–0	Brentford	Swansea
18:30 BST	Bidwell (yellow card) 18'; Cabango (yellow card) 55'; Brewster (yellow card) 78'; Ayew 81'	Report	Jensen (yellow card) 45+2'; Dalsgaard (yellow card) 47'; Henry (red card) 65'; Nørgaard (yellow card) 90'	Stadium: Liberty Stadium; Attendance: 0 Referee: Keith Stroud

29 July 2020 Semi-final 2nd leg	Brentford	3–1 (3–2 agg.)	Swansea City	Brentford
19:45 BST	Dalsgaard (yellow card) 9'; Watkins 11'; Marcondes 15'; Mbeumo 46'; Benrahma (yellow card) 83'	Report	Cabango (yellow card) 54'; Dhanda (yellow card) 75'; Brewster 78'; Ayew (yellow card) 82'; Roberts (yellow card) 90+3'	Stadium: Griffin Park; Attendance: 0 Referee: Chris Kavanagh

4 August 2020 Final	Brentford	1–2 (a.e.t.)	Fulham	London
19:45 BST	Jensen (yellow card) 88'; Nørgaard (yellow card) 103'; Dalsgaard 120+4'	Report	Reed (yellow card) 29'; Cairney (yellow card) 67'; Hector (yellow card) 98'; Knockaert (yellow card) 102'; Mitrović (yellow card) 104'; Bryan 105', 117'; Cavaleiro (yellow card) 120+2'; Rodák (yellow card) 120+4'	Stadium: Wembley Stadium; Attendance: 0 Referee: Martin Atkinson

=== FA Cup ===
4 January 2020 Third round	Brentford	1–0	Stoke City	Brentford
15:01 GMT	Marcondes 43'; Daniels (yellow card) 90'	Report	Campbell (yellow card) 43'	Stadium: Griffin Park; Attendance: 7,575; Referee: Keith Stroud

25 January 2020 Fourth round	Brentford	0–1	Leicester City	Brentford
12:45 GMT		Report	Iheanacho 4'	Stadium: Griffin Park; Attendance: 12,221; Referee: Chris Kavanagh

=== EFL Cup ===
13 August 2019 First round	Brentford	1–1 (4–5 p)	Cambridge United	Brentford
19:45 BST	Thompson (yellow card) 18'; Forss 69'	Report	Richards 3'; John (yellow card) 20'	Stadium: Griffin Park; Attendance: 5,215; Referee: Lee Swabey
	Penalties
	Jensen (penalty scored); Marcondes (penalty missed); Mbeumo (penalty scored); Watkins (penalty scored); Forss (penalty scored); Racic (penalty missed)		(penalty scored) Hannant; (penalty missed) Lewis; (penalty scored) Dunk; (penalty scored) Lambe; (penalty scored) Darling; (penalty scored) Knibbs

== First team squad ==
Players' ages are as of the opening day of the 2019–20 season.

#	Name	Nationality	Position	Date of birth (age)	Signed from	Signed in	Notes
Goalkeepers
1	David Raya	(Spain)	GK	15 September 1995 (aged 23)	Blackburn Rovers	2019	
13	Patrik Gunnarsson	(Iceland)	GK	15 November 2000 (aged 18)	Breiðablik	2018	Loaned to Southend United
25	Ellery Balcombe	(England)	GK	15 October 1999 (aged 19)	Academy	2016	Loaned to Viborg FF
28	Luke Daniels	(England)	GK	5 January 1988 (aged 31)	Scunthorpe United	2017	
41	Nathan Shepperd	(Wales)	GK	9 October 2000 (aged 18)	Swansea City	2019	
Defenders
2	Dominic Thompson	(England)	LB	26 July 2000 (aged 19)	Arsenal	2019	
3	Rico Henry	(Jamaica)	LB	8 July 1997 (aged 22)	Walsall	2016	
5	Ethan Pinnock	(Jamaica)	CB	29 May 1993 (aged 26)	Barnsley	2019	
18	Pontus Jansson	(Sweden)	CB	13 February 1991 (aged 28)	Leeds United	2019	
22	Henrik Dalsgaard	(Denmark)	RB	27 July 1989 (aged 30)	Zulte Waregem	2017	
23	Julian Jeanvier	(Guinea)	CB	31 March 1992 (aged 27)	Reims	2018	
29	Mads Bech Sørensen	(Denmark)	CB	7 January 1999 (aged 20)	AC Horsens	2017	Loaned to AFC Wimbledon
32	Luka Racic	(Denmark)	CB	8 May 1999 (aged 20)	FC Copenhagen	2018	
35	Mads Roerslev	(Denmark)	RB	24 June 1999 (aged 20)	FC Copenhagen	2019	
40	Kane O'Connor	(Scotland)	CB	17 January 2001 (aged 18)	Hibernian	2019	
Midfielders
4	Dru Yearwood	(England)	CM	17 February 2000 (aged 19)	Southend United	2019	
6	Christian Nørgaard	(Denmark)	DM	10 March 1994 (aged 25)	Fiorentina	2019	
8	Mathias Jensen	(Denmark)	CM	1 January 1996 (aged 23)	Celta	2019	
12	Kamohelo Mokotjo	(South Africa)	DM	11 March 1991 (aged 28)	FC Twente	2017	
14	Josh Dasilva	(England)	AM	23 October 1998 (aged 20)	Arsenal	2018	
17	Emiliano Marcondes	(Denmark)	AM	9 March 1995 (aged 24)	Nordsjælland	2018	Loaned to FC Midtjylland
26	Shandon Baptiste	(Grenada)	CM	8 April 1998 (aged 21)	Oxford United	2020	
31	Jan Žambůrek	(Czech Republic)	CM	13 February 2001 (aged 18)	Slavia Prague	2018	
33	Fredrik Hammar	(Sweden)	CM	26 February 2001 (aged 18)	Akropolis IF	2019	
34	Jaakko Oksanen	(Finland)	CM	7 November 2000 (aged 18)	HJK Helsinki	2018	
37	Arthur Read	(England)	CM	3 November 1999 (aged 19)	Luton Town	2019	
Attackers
7	Sergi Canós	(Spain)	W	2 February 1997 (aged 22)	Norwich City	2017	
9	Nikos Karelis	(Greece)	FW	24 February 1992 (aged 27)	Unattached	2019	
10	Saïd Benrahma	(Algeria)	W	10 August 1995 (aged 23)	OGC Nice	2018	
11	Ollie Watkins	(England)	FW	30 December 1995 (aged 23)	Exeter City	2017	
15	Marcus Forss	(Finland)	FW	18 June 1999 (aged 20)	West Bromwich Albion	2017	Loaned to AFC Wimbledon
16	Joel Valencia	(Ecuador)	W	16 November 1994 (aged 24)	Piast Gliwice	2019	
19	Bryan Mbeumo	(France)	W	7 August 1999 (aged 19)	Troyes	2019	
21	Halil Dervişoğlu	(Turkey)	FW	8 December 1999 (aged 19)	Sparta Rotterdam	2020	
24	Tariqe Fosu	(Ghana)	LW	5 November 1995 (aged 23)	Oxford United	2020	
36	Gustav Mogensen	(Denmark)	FW	19 April 2001 (aged 18)	AGF Aarhus	2019	
38	Joe Adams	(Wales)	LW	13 February 2001 (aged 18)	Bury	2019	
Players who left the club mid-season
~~9~~	Neal Maupay	(France)	FW	14 August 1996 (aged 22)	Saint-Étienne	2017	Transferred to Brighton & Hove Albion
20	Josh Clarke	(England)	RB / RW	5 July 1994 (aged 25)	Academy	2013	Released
~~24~~	Chiedozie Ogbene	(Republic of Ireland)	W	1 May 1997 (aged 22)	Limerick	2018	Transferred to Rotherham United
27	Justin Shaibu	(Denmark)	FW	28 October 1997 (aged 21)	HB Køge	2016	Loaned to Boreham Wood, released
30	Tom Field	(Republic of Ireland)	LB	14 March 1997 (aged 22)	Academy	2015	Transferred to Dundee
39	Japhet Sery Larsen	(Denmark)	CB	10 April 2000 (aged 19)	FC Midtjylland	2019	Returned to FC Midtjylland after loan

== Statistics ==
=== Appearances and goals ===
Substitute appearances in brackets.

No	Pos	Nat	Name	League		FA Cup		League Cup		Playoffs		Total	
No	Pos	Nat	Name	Apps	Goals	Apps	Goals	Apps	Goals	Apps	Goals	Apps	Goals
1	GK	(Spain)	David Raya	46	0	0	0	0	0	3	0	49	0
2	DF	(England)	Dominic Thompson	0 (2)	0	2	0	1	0	0	0	3 (2)	0
3	DF	(Jamaica)	Rico Henry	46	0	0 (1)	0	0 (1)	0	3	0	49 (2)	0
4	MF	(England)	Dru Yearwood	0 (2)	0	2	0	1	0	0	0	3 (2)	0
5	DF	(Jamaica)	Ethan Pinnock	34 (2)	2	1	0	0	0	3	0	38 (2)	2
6	MF	(Denmark)	Christian Nørgaard	40 (2)	0	0	0	0	0	3	0	43 (2)	0
7	MF	(Spain)	Sergi Canós	11 (2)	0	0	0	0	0	0 (2)	0	11 (4)	0
8	MF	(Denmark)	Mathias Jensen	30 (9)	1	0	0	0 (1)	0	3	0	33 (10)	1
9	FW	(Greece)	Nikos Karelis	1 (3)	0	0	0	—		0	0	1 (3)	0
10	MF	(Algeria)	Saïd Benrahma	38 (4)	17	0	0	0	0	3	0	41 (4)	17
11	FW	(England)	Ollie Watkins	46	25	0	0	0 (1)	0	3	1	49 (1)	26
12	MF	(South Africa)	Kamohelo Mokotjo	14 (11)	1	1	0	0	0	0	0	15 (11)	1
14	MF	(England)	Josh Dasilva	34 (8)	10	0 (2)	0	0	0	2 (1)	0	36 (11)	10
15	FW	(Finland)	Marcus Forss	0 (2)	0	0	0	1	1	0	0	1 (2)	1
16	MF	(Ecuador)	Joel Valencia	1 (18)	1	2	0	1	0	0 (1)	0	4 (19)	1
17	MF	(Denmark)	Emiliano Marcondes	13 (12)	2	2	1	1	0	1 (2)	1	17 (14)	4
18	DF	(Sweden)	Pontus Jansson	34	0	0	0	0	0	3	0	37	0
19	MF	(France)	Bryan Mbeumo	36 (6)	15	0 (1)	0	1	0	3	1	40 (7)	16
20	DF	(England)	Josh Clarke	0 (1)	0	0	0	1	0	—		1 (1)	0
21	FW	(Turkey)	Halil Dervişoğlu	0 (4)	0	2	0	—		0 (1)	0	2 (5)	0
22	DF	(Denmark)	Henrik Dalsgaard	42 (1)	1	0	0	1	0	3	1	46 (1)	2
23	DF	(Guinea)	Julian Jeanvier	25 (1)	1	1	0	0	0	0	0	26 (1)	1
24	MF	(Ghana)	Tariqe Fosu	2 (8)	1	—		—		0 (1)	0	2 (9)	1
26	MF	(Grenada)	Shandon Baptiste	3 (9)	0	—		—		0 (1)	0	3 (10)	0
28	GK	(England)	Luke Daniels	0	0	2	0	1	0	0	0	3	0
29	DF	(Denmark)	Mads Bech Sørensen	0 (1)	0	1	0	0	0	0	0	1 (1)	0
31	MF	(Czech Republic)	Jan Žambůrek	1 (15)	0	2	0	1	0	0	0	4 (15)	0
32	DF	(Denmark)	Luka Racic	3 (1)	1	2	0	1	0	0	0	6 (1)	1
33	MF	(Sweden)	Fredrik Hammar	0	0	0 (1)	0	0	0	0	0	0 (1)	0
34	MF	(Finland)	Jaakko Oksanen	0 (1)	0	0 (1)	0	0	0	0	0	0 (2)	0
35	DF	(Denmark)	Mads Roerslev	5 (6)	0	2	0	0	0	0 (1)	0	7 (7)	0

- Players listed in italics left the club mid-season
- Source: Soccerbase

=== Goalscorers ===
No	Pos	Nat	Player	Lg.	FAC	FLC	FLP	Total
11	FW	(England)	Ollie Watkins	25	0	0	1	26
10	MF	(Algeria)	Saïd Benrahma	17	0	0	0	17
19	MF	(France)	Bryan Mbeumo	15	0	0	1	16
14	MF	(England)	Josh Dasilva	10	0	0	0	10
17	MF	(Denmark)	Emiliano Marcondes	2	1	0	1	4
5	DF	(Jamaica)	Ethan Pinnock	2	0	0	0	2
22	DF	(Denmark)	Henrik Dalsgaard	1	0	0	1	2
24	MF	(Ghana)	Tariqe Fosu	1	0	0	0	1
23	DF	(Guinea)	Julian Jeanvier	1	0	0	0	1
8	MF	(Denmark)	Mathias Jensen	1	0	0	0	1
12	MF	(South Africa)	Kamohelo Mokotjo	1	0	0	0	1
32	DF	(Denmark)	Luka Racic	1	0	0	0	1
16	MF	(Ecuador)	Joel Valencia	1	0	0	0	1
15	FW	(Finland)	Marcus Forss	0	0	1	0	1
Opponents				2	0	0	0	2
Total				78	1	1	4	84

- Players listed in italics left the club mid-season
- Source: Soccerbase

=== Discipline ===
No	Pos	Nat	Player	FLCh.		FAC		FLCu.		FLP		Total		Pts
No	Pos	Nat	Player	Booked	Sent off (straight red)	Booked	Sent off (straight red)	Booked	Sent off (straight red)	Booked	Sent off (straight red)	Booked	Sent off (straight red)	Pts
6	MF	(Denmark)	Christian Nørgaard	9	0	0	0	0	0	2	0	11	0	11
3	DF	(Jamaica)	Rico Henry	5	0	0	0	0	0	0	1	5	1	8
22	DF	(Denmark)	Henrik Dalsgaard	5	0	0	0	0	0	2	0	7	0	7
10	MF	(Algeria)	Saïd Benrahma	5	0	0	0	0	0	1	0	6	0	6
18	DF	(Sweden)	Pontus Jansson	5	0	0	0	0	0	0	0	5	0	5
23	DF	(Guinea)	Julian Jeanvier	2	1	0	0	0	0	0	0	2	1	5
8	MF	(Denmark)	Mathias Jensen	2	0	0	0	0	0	2	0	4	0	4
11	FW	(England)	Ollie Watkins	4	0	0	0	0	0	0	0	4	0	4
7	MF	(Spain)	Sergi Canós	3	0	0	0	0	0	0	0	3	0	3
19	MF	(France)	Bryan Mbeumo	3	0	0	0	0	0	0	0	3	0	3
14	MF	(England)	Josh Dasilva	2	0	0	0	0	0	0	0	2	0	2
17	MF	(Denmark)	Emiliano Marcondes	2	0	0	0	0	0	0	0	2	0	2
26	MF	(Grenada)	Shandon Baptiste	1	0	—		—		0	0	1	0	1
21	FW	(Turkey)	Halil Dervişoğlu	1	0	0	0	—		0	0	1	0	1
5	DF	(Jamaica)	Ethan Pinnock	1	0	0	0	0	0	0	0	1	0	1
35	DF	(Denmark)	Mads Roerslev	1	0	0	0	0	0	0	0	1	0	1
4	MF	(England)	Dru Yearwood	1	0	0	0	0	0	0	0	1	0	1
28	GK	(England)	Luke Daniels	0	0	1	0	0	0	0	0	1	0	1
2	DF	(England)	Dominic Thompson	0	0	0	0	1	0	0	0	1	0	1
Total				48	1	1	0	1	0	7	1	57	2	63

- Players listed in italics left the club mid-season.
- Source: ESPN

=== International caps ===
No	Pos	Nat	Player	Caps	Goals	Ref
10	MF	(Algeria)	Saïd Benrahma	1	0	
12	MF	(South Africa)	Kamohelo Mokotjo	2	0	
18	CB	(Sweden)	Pontus Jansson	1	0	
22	DF	(Denmark)	Henrik Dalsgaard	4	0	
23	DF	(Guinea)	Julian Jeanvier	3	0	

- Players listed in italics left the club mid-season.
- Only international caps won while contracted to Brentford are counted.

== Coaching staff ==
Name	Role
(Denmark) Thomas Frank	Head Coach
(Denmark) Brian Riemer	Assistant Head Coach
(Republic of Ireland) Kevin O'Connor	Assistant First Team Coach
(Spain) Iñaki Caña / (England) Andy Quy	Goalkeeper Coach
(Sweden) Andreas Georgson	Head of Set Pieces and Individual Development
(England) Neil Greig	Head of Medical
(England) Chris Haslam	Head of Athletic Performance
(England) Luke Stopforth	Head of Performance Analysis

- Andy Quy replaced Iñaki Caña on 24 December 2019.
- Source: brentfordfc.com

== Kit ==
Supplier: Umbro
Sponsor(s): EcoWorld

2019–2020	Away	Third

Source: Brentford F.C.

== Awards ==
- Supporters' Player of the Year: Saïd Benrahma
- Players' Player of the Year: Ollie Watkins
- EFL Championship Player of the Year: Ollie Watkins
- London Football Awards EFL Player of the Year: Ollie Watkins
- London Football Awards Manager of the Year: Thomas Frank
- Championship PFA Team of the Year: Saïd Benrahma, Ollie Watkins
- PFA Fans' Championship Player of the Month: Saïd Benrahma (January 2020)
- EFL Championship Manager of the Month: Thomas Frank (June 2020)
- EFL Championship Player of the Month: Saïd Benrahma (July 2020)
- EFL Golden Glove: David Raya (shared)
- League Managers Association Performance of the Week: Thomas Frank (2)
  - Brentford 7–0 Luton Town, Championship, 30 November 2019
  - Fulham 0–2 Brentford, Championship, 20 June 2020
