= 2018–19 Brentford F.C. season =

English football team season

Brentford
2018–19 season
- Owner: Matthew Benham
- Chairman: Cliff Crown
- Head Coach: Dean Smith (until 10 October); Thomas Frank (from 16 October)
- Stadium: Griffin Park
- Championship: 11th
- FA Cup: Fifth round
- EFL Cup: Third round
- Top goalscorer: League: Neal Maupay (25); All: Neal Maupay (28)
- Highest home attendance: 12,225 v Derby County (6 April 2019, League, round 40)
- Lowest home attendance: 4,384 v Cheltenham Town (28 August 2018, EFL Cup, R2)
- Average home league attendance: 10,257
- Biggest win: 5–1 v Rotherham United (4 August 2018, League, round 1)
- Biggest defeat: 1–4 v Swansea City (17 February 2019, FA Cup, R5)
Home colours	Away colours

The 2018–19 season was Brentford's 129th year in existence and fifth consecutive season in the Championship. Along with competing in the Championship, the club also participated in the FA Cup and the EFL Cup.

The season covers the period from 1 July 2018 to 30 June 2019 and was their penultimate at Griffin Park.

== Transfers ==
=== Transfers in ===
Players transferred in
Date	Pos.	Name	Previous club	Fee	Ref.
1 July 2018	MF	(Iceland) Kolbeinn Finnsson	(Netherlands) FC Groningen	Free	
1 July 2018	GK	(Iceland) Patrik Gunnarsson	(Iceland) Breiðablik	Undisclosed	
1 July 2018	DF	(England) Ezri Konsa	(England) Charlton Athletic	£2,500,000	
1 July 2018	MF	(Scotland) Jonny Mitchell	(Scotland) Falkirk	Undisclosed	
5 July 2018	DF	(Denmark) Luka Racic	(Denmark) FC Copenhagen	Undisclosed	
6 July 2018	MF	(Algeria) Saïd Benrahma	(France) Nice	£3,000,000	
30 July 2018	DF	(Guinea) Julian Jeanvier	(France) Reims	Undisclosed	
7 August 2018	DF	(Wales) Cole Dasilva	(England) Chelsea	Free	
7 August 2018	MF	(Czech Republic) Matěj Majka	(Czech Republic) Sparta Prague	Undisclosed	
7 August 2018	DF	(England) Moses Odubajo	(England) Hull City	Free	
9 August 2018	DF	(Republic of Ireland) Canice Carroll	(England) Oxford United	Undisclosed	
9 August 2018	MF	(Czech Republic) Jan Žambůrek	(Czech Republic) Slavia Prague	Undisclosed	
21 August 2018	MF	(England) Josh Dasilva	(England) Arsenal	Compensation	
31 August 2018	GK	(Sweden) Simon Andersson	(Sweden) Halmstads BK	Compensation	
17 December 2018	MF	(England) Jayden Onen	(England) Brighton & Hove Albion	Free	
26 January 2019	MF	(England) Jaden Brissett	(England) Norwich City	Free	
29 January 2019	MF	(Sweden) Fredrik Hammar	(Sweden) Akropolis IF	Undisclosed	
31 January 2019	FW	(Denmark) Gustav Mogensen	(Denmark) AGF Aarhus	Undisclosed	
9 May 2019	DF	(Cyprus) Nick Tsaroulla	Unattached	Free	

=== Loans in ===
Players loaned in
Start date	Pos.	Name	Parent Club	End date	Ref.
16 July 2018	MF	(Denmark) Nikolaj Kirk	(Denmark) FC Midtjylland	31 March 2019	
31 August 2018	DF	(England) Charlie Oliver	(England) Manchester City	4 January 2019	

=== Transfers out ===
Players transferred out
Date	Pos.	Name	Subsequent club	Fee	Ref.
1 July 2018	MF	(Austria) Konstantin Kerschbaumer	(Germany) FC Ingolstadt 04	Undisclosed	
19 July 2018	DF	(Republic of Ireland) John Egan	(England) Sheffield United	Undisclosed	
20 July 2018	MF	(Suriname) Florian Jozefzoon	(England) Derby County	Undisclosed	
23 July 2018	DF	(Greece) Ilias Chatzitheodoridis	(Greece) Panathinaikos	Undisclosed	
31 August 2018	DF	(Denmark) Lukas Talbro	(Denmark) FC Nordsjælland	Undisclosed	
4 January 2019	MF	(England) Ryan Woods	(England) Stoke City	Undisclosed	
14 January 2019	MF	(Republic of Ireland) Alan Judge	(England) Ipswich Town	Undisclosed	
22 January 2019	DF	(Wales) Chris Mepham	(England) Bournemouth	£12,000,000	
31 January 2019	MF	(China) Nico Yennaris	(China) Beijing Sinobo Guoan	Undisclosed	

=== Loans out ===
Players loaned out
Start date	Pos.	Name	Subsequent club	End date	Ref.
2 July 2018	MF	(Scotland) Theo Archibald	(England) Forest Green Rovers	7 January 2019	
27 July 2018	MF	(England) Reece Cole	(England) Yeovil Town	24 August 2018	
6 August 2018	GK	(England) Ellery Balcombe	(England) Boreham Wood	24 October 2018	
6 August 2018	FW	(Denmark) Justin Shaibu	(England) Boreham Wood	End of season	
25 August 2018	MF	(England) Ryan Woods	(England) Stoke City	4 January 2019	
27 August 2018	GK	(Republic of Ireland) Jack Bonham	(England) Bristol Rovers	End of season	
31 August 2018	DF	(Republic of Ireland) Tom Field	(England) Cheltenham Town	1 January 2019	
31 August 2018	MF	(Republic of Ireland) Chiedozie Ogbene	(England) Exeter City	1 January 2019	
23 November 2018	MF	(England) Reece Cole	(England) Maidenhead United	4 January 2019	
3 December 2018	DF	(England) Jarvis Edobor	(England) Maidstone United	End of season	
4 January 2019	DF	(Republic of Ireland) Canice Carroll	(England) Swindon Town	End of season	
11 January 2019	DF	(England) Josh Clarke	(England) Burton Albion	End of season	
18 January 2019	MF	(England) Reece Cole	(England) Macclesfield Town	End of season	
3 May 2019	MF	(Iceland) Kolbeinn Finnsson	(Iceland) Fylkir	27 July 2019	

=== Released ===
Players released
Date	Pos.	Name	Subsequent club	Join date	Ref.
7 June 2019	MF	(Sweden) Henrik Johansson	(Sweden) Trelleborgs FF	11 July 2019	
30 June 2019	DF	(France) Yoann Barbet	(England) Queens Park Rangers	1 July 2019	
30 June 2019	GK	(Republic of Ireland) Jack Bonham	(England) Gillingham	1 July 2019	
30 June 2019	DF	(England) Jarvis Edobor	(England) Chelmsford City	8 August 2019	
30 June 2019	MF	(Scotland) Lewis Macleod	(England) Wigan Athletic	12 July 2019	
30 June 2019	MF	(England) Josh McEachran	(England) Birmingham City	27 September 2019	
30 June 2019	DF	(England) Moses Odubajo	(England) Sheffield Wednesday	11 July 2019	

== Results ==
=== Pre-season and friendlies ===
6 July 2018	Boreham Wood	1–2	Brentford	Borehamwood
19:30 BST	Ferrier 28' (pen.)	Report	Watkins 44'; Macleod 62'	Stadium: Meadow Park

14 July 2018	Karlsruher SC	2–1	Brentford	Grassau, Germany
13:00 CEST	Muslija (yellow card) 57'; Pisot (yellow card) 71'; Batmaz 73'; Gordon 81'	Report	Sørensen (yellow card) 42'; McEachran (yellow card) 43'; Watkins 85'	Stadium: ASV Sportpark

17 July 2018	Wycombe Wanderers	0–1	Brentford	High Wycombe
19:45 BST		Report	Forss 76' (pen.)	Stadium: Adams Park; Attendance: 1,315; Referee: David Rock; Assistant referees: Samuel Ogles; Mike Desborough; Fourth official: Martin Bloor

19 July 2018	Arsenal	1–2	Brentford	London Colney
	Aubameyang	Report		Stadium: Arsenal Training Centre; Attendance: 0

21 July 2018	Shrewsbury Town	2–3	Brentford	Shrewsbury
15:00 BST	Okenabirhie; Amadi-Holloway	Report	Forss; Nsiala (o.g.); Marcondes	Stadium: New Meadow; Attendance: 2,454

21 July 2018	Tottenham Hotspur XI	2–1	Brentford	Enfield
	Llorente 38'; N'Koudou 89'	Report	Maupay 59'	Stadium: Hotspur Way; Attendance: 0

28 July 2018	Brentford	1–2	Watford	Brentford
15:00 BST	Watkins 5'	Report	Dalsgaard 25' (o.g.); Gray 36'	Stadium: Griffin Park

15 November 2018	Brentford	1–2	West Ham United	Brentford
	Marcondes	Report	Snodgrass; Hernandez	Stadium: Griffin Park; Attendance: 0

20 March 2019	Brentford XI	3–0	Swindon Town	Brentford
	Marcondes; Dasilva; Coote	Report		Stadium: Griffin Park; Attendance: 0

=== Championship ===
==== League table ====
Pos	Team	Pld	W	D	L	GF	GA	GD	Pts
8	Bristol City	46	19	13	14	59	53	+6	70
9	Nottingham Forest	46	17	15	14	61	54	+7	66
10	Swansea City	46	18	11	17	65	62	+3	65
11	Brentford	46	17	13	16	73	59	+14	64 (Note: Brentford were awarded a 1–0 win over Bolton due to Bolton's inability to hold the fixture.)
12	Sheffield Wednesday	46	16	16	14	60	62	−2	64
13	Hull City	46	17	11	18	66	68	−2	62
14	Preston North End	46	16	13	17	67	67	0	61

Source: Sky Sports Archived 25 September 2019 at the Wayback Machine
Rules for classification: 1) Points; 2) Goal difference; 3) Number of goals scored; 4) Head-to-head results

==== Results summary ====
Overall								Home						Away					
Pld	W	D	L	GF	GA	GD	Pts	W	D	L	GF	GA	GD	W	D	L	GF	GA	GD
46	17	13	16	73	59	+14	64	14	4	5	50	23	+27	3	9	11	23	36	−13

- Source: Sports Mole

==== Result by matchday ====
Round	1	2	3	4	5	6	7	8	9	10	11	12	13	14	15	16	17	18	19	20	21	22	23	24	25	26	27	28	29	30	31	32	33	34	35	36	37	38	39	40	41	42	43	44	45	46
Ground	H	A	H	A	A	H	H	A	A	H	H	A	H	A	A	H	A	H	H	A	H	A	H	A	A	H	H	A	H	A	H	H	A	H	A	A	H	A	A	H	H	A	A	H	A	H
Result	W	D	W	D	L	W	W	D	L	D	D	D	L	L	L	W	L	L	L	D	L	L	W	D	D	D	W	W	W	L	W	W	L	W	W	L	L	D	L	D	W	L	D	W	W	W
Position	1	6	4	4	8	6	2	2	7	6	5	6	12	15	16	13	15	15	17	17	18	20	18	18	18	18	17	17	17	18	15	16	16	15	12	14	14	13	13	14	13	14	15	15	12	11

Source: Soccerbase
A = Away; H = Home; W = Win; D = Draw; L = Loss

==== Matches ====
4 August 2018 1	Brentford	5–1	Rotherham United	Brentford
15:00 BST	Maupay 4', 60'; Canós 44'; Watkins 48'; Macleod 89'	Report	Vaulks 90+2'	Stadium: Griffin Park; Attendance: 10,297; Referee: Oliver Langford

11 August 2018 2	Stoke City	1–1	Brentford	Stoke-on-Trent
15:00 BST	Afobe 29'	Report	Watkins 66'	Stadium: Bet365 Stadium; Attendance: 24,806; Referee: Andy Davies

19 August 2018 3	Brentford	2–0	Sheffield Wednesday	Brentford
15:00 BST	Maupay 20'; Dalsgaard (yellow card) 55'; Watkins 61'	Report	Baker (yellow card) 62'	Stadium: Griffin Park; Attendance: 10,134; Referee: David Webb

22 August 2018 4	Aston Villa	2–2	Brentford	Aston
19:45 BST	Kodjia 39', 90+5'	Report	Maupay 23', 82'	Stadium: Villa Park; Attendance: 30,011; Referee: Jonathan Moss

25 August 2018 5	Blackburn Rovers	1–0	Brentford	Blackburn
15:00 BST	Palmer 54'	Report		Stadium: Ewood Park; Attendance: 12,094; Referee: Tony Harrington

1 September 2018 6	Brentford	2–1	Nottingham Forest	Brentford
15:00 BST	Macleod 45+3'; Watkins 84'	Report	Cash 62'	Stadium: Griffin Park; Attendance: 10,186; Referee: Peter Bankes

15 September 2018 7	Brentford	2–0	Wigan Athletic	Brentford
15:00 BST	Maupay 24', 63'	Report	Morsy (red card) 58'	Stadium: Griffin Park; Attendance: 9,951; Referee: Darren England

18 September 2018 8	Ipswich Town	1–1	Brentford	Ipswich
19:45 BST	Jackson 73'	Report	Maupay 31'	Stadium: Portman Road; Attendance: 14,897; Referee: Darren Bond

22 September 2018 9	Derby County	3–1	Brentford	Derby
15:00 BST	Wilson 14'; Nugent 21'; Mount 28'	Report	Dalsgaard 1'	Stadium: Pride Park Stadium; Attendance: 25,110; Referee: Andrew Madley

29 September 2018 10	Brentford	2–2	Reading	Brentford
15:00 BST	Maupay 11'; Benrahma (red card) 86'; Barbet 90+2'	Report	Böðvarsson 25'; Swift 64'	Stadium: Griffin Park; Attendance: 10,045; Referee: Geoff Eltringham

2 October 2018 11	Brentford	1–1	Birmingham City	Brentford
19:45 BST	McEachran 42'	Report	Morrison 26'; Kieftenbeld (red card) 66'	Stadium: Griffin Park; Attendance: 9,715; Referee: Tim Robinson

6 October 2018 12	Leeds United	1–1	Brentford	Leeds
12:30 BST	Jansson 88'; Ayling (red card) 90+4'	Report	Maupay 62' (pen.)	Stadium: Elland Road; Attendance: 31,880; Referee: Jeremy Simpson

20 October 2018 13	Brentford	0–1	Bristol City	Brentford
15:00 BST	Mepham (yellow card) 50', (yellow card) 58' (red card); Yennaris (yellow card) 82'; Sawyers (yellow card) 84'; Maupay (yellow card) 90'	Report	Weimann (yellow card) 45'; Pack (yellow card) 50'; Kelly (yellow card) 65'; Eliasson 89'	Stadium: Griffin Park; Attendance: 11,182; Referee: Robert Jones

24 October 2018 14	Preston North End	4–3	Brentford	Preston
19:45 BST	Browne 5'; Robinson 12', 69'; Barkhuizen 23'	Report	Canós 29'; Watkins 56'; Maupay 85'	Stadium: Deepdale; Attendance: 10,882; Referee: Scott Duncan

27 October 2018 15	Norwich City	1–0	Brentford	Norwich
15:00 BST	Buendiá 34'	Report	Dalsgaard (yellow card) 5'	Stadium: Carrow Road; Attendance: 25,443; Referee: Oliver Langford

3 November 2018 16	Brentford	2–0	Millwall	Brentford
15:00 GMT	Sawyers (yellow card) 25'; Canós 48'; Watkins 85'	Report	Leonard (yellow card) 32'	Stadium: Griffin Park; Attendance: 9,476; Referee: Simon Hooper

10 November 2018 17	Queens Park Rangers	3–2	Brentford	Shepherd's Bush
15:00 GMT	Luongo 50'; Lynch 58'; Wells 60'	Report	Maupay 22'; Dalsgaard 81'	Stadium: Loftus Road; Attendance: 17,609; Referee: James Linington

24 November 2018 18	Brentford	1–2	Middlesbrough	Brentford
17:30 GMT	Judge 75'	Report	Hugill 56'; Tavernier 61'	Stadium: Griffin Park; Attendance: 9,430; Referee: John Brooks

27 November 2018 19	Brentford	2–3	Sheffield United	Brentford
19:45 GMT	Maupay 6'; Fleck 65' (o.g.)	Report	Konsa 10' (o.g.); Norwood 15'; Clarke 72'	Stadium: Griffin Park; Attendance: 8,903; Referee: Stephen Martin

3 December 2018 20	West Bromwich Albion	1–1	Brentford	West Bromwich
20:00 GMT	Barnes 77'	Report	Macleod 90+1'	Stadium: The Hawthorns; Attendance: 20,949; Referee: Darren Bond

8 December 2018 21	Brentford	2–3	Swansea City	Brentford
15:00 GMT	Watkins 45'; Benrahma 69'	Report	Routledge 1'; Mepham 22' (o.g.); Fer 27'	Stadium: Griffin Park; Attendance: 9,442; Referee: Andy Woolmer

15 December 2018 22	Hull City	2–0	Brentford	Kingston upon Hull
15:00 GMT	Campbell 12', 21'	Report		Stadium: KCOM Stadium; Attendance: 10,530; Referee: Andy Davies

22 December 2018 23	Brentford	1–0	Bolton Wanderers	Brentford
15:00 GMT	Mepham (yellow card) 40'; Maupay 62'	Report	Lowe (yellow card) 14'; Wheater (yellow card) 72'; O'Neil (yellow card) 90+5'	Stadium: Griffin Park; Attendance: 10,512; Referee: James Linington

26 December 2018 24	Bristol City	1–1	Brentford	Bristol
15:00 GMT	Pisano 20'	Report	Maupay (yellow card) 26' (goal) 53'	Stadium: Ashton Gate Stadium; Attendance: 21,207; Referee: David Webb

29 December 2018 25	Birmingham City	0–0	Brentford	Birmingham
15:00 GMT		Report	Sawyers (yellow card) 26'; Jeanvier (yellow card) 52'; Maupay (yellow card) 64'; Barbet (yellow card) 75'; Yennaris (yellow card) 90+3'	Stadium: St Andrew's; Attendance: 25,909; Referee: Peter Bankes

1 January 2019 26	Brentford	1–1	Norwich City	Brentford
15:00 GMT	Jeanvier 22'; Sawyers (yellow card) 24'; Henry (yellow card) 66'; Dalsgaard (yellow card) 87'; Watkins (yellow card) 90'	Report	Zimmermann (yellow card) 20'; Aarons (yellow card) 45'; Klose (yellow card) 45+3' (goal) 83'	Stadium: Griffin Park; Attendance: 9,524; Referee: Gavin Ward

12 January 2019 27	Brentford	3–1	Stoke City	Brentford
15:00 GMT	Shawcross 7' (o.g.); Benrahma 17'; Henry 54'	Report	Edwards (yellow card) 11'; Afobe 23'; Allen (yellow card) 82'	Stadium: Griffin Park; Attendance: 9,439; Referee: Tim Robinson

19 January 2019 28	Rotherham United	2–4	Brentford	Rotherham
15:00 GMT	Taylor 20'; Konsa 73' (o.g.); Yates (yellow card) 80'	Report	Mokotjo 2', 75'; Benrahma 53'; Maupay 85'	Stadium: New York Stadium; Attendance: 8,319; Referee: Tony Harrington

2 February 2019 29	Brentford	5–2	Blackburn Rovers	Brentford
15:00 GMT	Benrahma 13'; Barbet (yellow card) 45+3'; Watkins 58', 73'; Maupay 79'; Canós 90+2'	Report	Dack 2'; Graham 7'; Lenihan (yellow card) 71'	Stadium: Griffin Park; Attendance: 9,972; Referee: Andy Davies

9 February 2019 30	Nottingham Forest	2–1	Brentford	West Bridgford
15:00 GMT	Grabban 16' (penalty missed) 66'; Yates (yellow card) 62'; Wagué 79'; Milošević (yellow card) 90+1'	Report	Odubajo (yellow card) 59'; Canós 89'	Stadium: City Ground; Attendance: 27,829; Referee: Robert Jones

13 February 2019 31	Brentford	1–0	Aston Villa	Brentford
19:45 GMT	Maupay 90+1'	Report	Hutton (yellow card) 40'	Stadium: Griffin Park; Attendance: 9,636; Referee: Gavin Ward

23 February 2019 32	Brentford	5–1	Hull City	Brentford
15:00 GMT	Maupay (yellow card) 22' (goal) 52'; Mokotjo 28'; Benrahma 33', 43', 81'	Report	Campbell 24'; Kane (yellow card) 58'; Henriksen (yellow card) 78'; Evandro (yellow card) 90+2'	Stadium: Griffin Park; Attendance: 9,675; Referee: Tim Robinson

26 February 2019 33	Sheffield Wednesday	2–0	Brentford	Owlerton
19:45 GMT	Hutchinson (yellow card) 15'; Fletcher 41', 48'	Report		Stadium: Hillsborough Stadium; Attendance: 23,094; Referee: Scott Duncan

2 March 2019 34	Brentford	3–0	Queens Park Rangers	Brentford
15:00 GMT	Maupay 50' (pen.); Dalsgaard (yellow card) 67'; Benrahma 71'; Sawyers (yellow card) 77'; Canós 90+5'	Report	Hall (yellow card) 49'; Osayi-Samuel (yellow card) 64'	Stadium: Griffin Park; Attendance: 11,771; Referee: Keith Stroud

9 March 2019 35	Middlesbrough	1–2	Brentford	Middlesbrough
15:00 GMT	Fletcher 6'; Assombalonga (yellow card) 31'; Mikel (yellow card) 38'; Ayala (yellow card) 71'; Hugill (yellow card) 88'; Howson (yellow card) 90+5'	Report	Konsa (yellow card) 67'; Shotton 70' (o.g.); Benrahma 73'	Stadium: Riverside Stadium; Attendance: 22,069; Referee: Jeremy Simpson

12 March 2019 36	Sheffield United	2–0	Brentford	Sheffield
19:45 GMT	Basham (yellow card) 20'; Norwood 26' (pen.); Madine (red card) 35'; McGoldrick 84'	Report		Stadium: Bramall Lane; Attendance: 24,463; Referee: Tony Harrington

16 March 2019 37	Brentford	0–1	West Bromwich Albion	Brentford
15:00 GMT	Odubajo (yellow card) 58'; Jeanvier (yellow card) 65'	Report	Gayle (yellow card) 33'; Edwards 51'	Stadium: Griffin Park; Attendance: 11,488; Referee: Andrew Madley

30 March 2019 38	Wigan Athletic	0–0	Brentford	Wigan
15:00 GMT	Robinson (yellow card) 51'	Report	Barbet (yellow card) 45'; Sørensen (yellow card) 90+5'	Stadium: DW Stadium; Attendance: 9,953; Referee: Andy Woolmer

2 April 2019 39	Swansea City	3–0	Brentford	Swansea
19:45 BST	Dyer 1', 34'; James 78'	Report	Daniels (yellow card) 1'; Maupay (yellow card) 43'; Jeanvier (yellow card) 45+3'; Dalsgaard (yellow card) 77'	Stadium: Liberty Stadium; Referee: Peter Bankes

6 April 2019 40	Brentford	3–3	Derby County	Brentford
15:00 BST	Dalsgaard (yellow card) 15'; Jeanvier 23'; Maupay 31'; Henry (yellow card) 50'; Benrahma 83'; Canós (yellow card) 90+2'	Report	Wilson 13', 78'; Bogle (yellow card) 19' (goal) 26'; Johnson (yellow card) 22'; Cole (yellow card) 49'; Lawrence (yellow card) 69'; Tomori (yellow card) 90+2'	Stadium: Griffin Park; Attendance: 12,225; Referee: John Brooks

10 April 2019 41	Brentford	2–0	Ipswich Town	Brentford
19:45 BST	Maupay 20'; Watkins 28'; Sørensen (yellow card) 74'	Report	Nsiala (yellow card) 54'	Stadium: Griffin Park; Attendance: 10,039; Referee: Andy Davies

13 April 2019 42	Reading	2–1	Brentford	Reading
15:00 BST	Méïté 8', 15'; Ejaria (yellow card) 37'; Rinomhota (yellow card) 44'; Gunter (yellow card) 56'; Harriott (yellow card) 87'	Report	Maupay 45'; Sørensen (yellow card) 51'	Stadium: Madejski Stadium; Attendance: 16,892; Referee: Stephen Martin

19 April 2019 43	Millwall	1–1	Brentford	Bermondsey
13:00 BST	Gregory 15'; Elliott (yellow card) 67'	Report	Dasilva 20'; Canós (yellow card) 27'; Dalsgaard (red card) 35'; Marcondes (yellow card) 67'; Sawyers (yellow card) 82'	Stadium: The Den; Attendance: 14,530; Referee: Jeremy Simpson

22 April 2019 44	Brentford	2–0	Leeds United	Brentford
17:15 BST	Maupay 45' (yellow card) 73'; Canós 62'; Konsa (yellow card) 76'; Watkins (yellow card) 79'	Report	Klich (yellow card) 77'	Stadium: Griffin Park; Attendance: 11,580; Referee: Keith Stroud

27 April 2019 45	Bolton Wanderers	0–1	Brentford	Bolton
15:00 BST		Report		Stadium: University of Bolton Stadium; Referee: Tony Harrington
Note: This fixture was initially postponed and subsequently cancelled, with Brentford awarded a 1–0 victory and three points.

5 May 2019 46	Brentford	3–0	Preston North End	Brentford
12:30 BST	Konsa 45+4'; Maupay 54'; Forss 83'	Report	Johnson (yellow card) 28'; Fisher (yellow card) 65'	Stadium: Griffin Park; Attendance: 11,289; Referee: James Linington

=== FA Cup ===
5 January 2019 Third round	Brentford	1–0	Oxford United	Brentford
15:00 GMT	Maupay 80' (pen.)	Report	Mousinho (yellow card) 45+1'; Nelson (yellow card) 61'; Browne (yellow card) 90+5'; Henry (yellow card) 90+7'	Stadium: Griffin Park; Attendance: 6,106; Referee: Jeremy Simpson

28 January 2019 Fourth round	Barnet	3–3	Brentford	Canons Park
19:45 GMT	Coulthirst 50', 54'; Sparkes 75'	Report	Odubajo (yellow card) 38'; Watkins 40'; Maupay 60' (pen.); Canós 72'	Stadium: The Hive Stadium; Attendance: 6,215; Referee: Andrew Madley

5 February 2019 Fourth round replay	Brentford	3–1	Barnet	Brentford
19:45 GMT	Canós 7' (yellow card) 50'; Jeanvier 32'; Konsa (yellow card) 63'; Maupay 71'; Sørensen (yellow card) 85'	Report	Elito (yellow card) 49'; Sweeney (yellow card) 50'; Tutonda 74'	Stadium: Griffin Park; Attendance: 6,954; Referee: Roger East

17 February 2019 Fifth round	Swansea City	4–1	Brentford	Swansea
16:00 GMT	Daniels 49' (o.g.); James 53' van der Hoorn (yellow card) 56'; Celina 66' (yellow card) 67'; Byers 90'	Report	Barbet (yellow card) 5'; Watkins 28'; Konsa (yellow card) 48' (red card) 61'; Sawyers (yellow card) 88'	Stadium: Liberty Stadium; Attendance: 11,261; Referee: Stuart Attwell

=== EFL Cup ===
14 August 2018 First round	Southend United	2–4	Brentford	Southend-on-Sea
19:45 BST	Robinson 62'; McCoulsky 72'	Report	Forss 42'; Jeanvier 64'; Benrahma 67'; Mokotjo 85'	Stadium: Roots Hall; Attendance: 3,055; Referee: Keith Stroud

28 August 2018 Second round	Brentford	1–0	Cheltenham Town	Brentford
19:45 BST	Jeanvier 40'	Report		Stadium: Griffin Park; Attendance: 4,384; Referee: Ross Joyce

26 September 2018 Third round	Arsenal	3–1	Brentford	Holloway
19:45 BST	Welbeck 5', 37'; Lacazette 90+3'	Report	Judge 58'	Stadium: Emirates Stadium; Referee: Mike Dean

- Source: Soccerbase

== First team squad ==
Players' ages are as of the opening day of the 2018–19 season.

#	Name	Nationality	Position	Date of birth (age)	Signed from	Signed in	Notes
Goalkeepers
1	Dan Bentley	(England)	GK	13 July 1993 (aged 25)	Southend United	2016	
13	Patrik Gunnarsson	(Iceland)	GK	15 November 2000 (aged 17)	Breiðablik	2018	
16	Jack Bonham	(Republic of Ireland)	GK	14 September 1993 (aged 24)	Watford	2013	Loaned to Bristol Rovers
25	Ellery Balcombe	(England)	GK	15 October 1999 (aged 18)	Academy	2016	Loaned to Boreham Wood
28	Luke Daniels	(England)	GK	5 January 1988 (aged 30)	Scunthorpe United	2017	
Defenders
2	Moses Odubajo	(England)	RB / RW	28 July 1993 (aged 25)	Hull City	2018	
3	Rico Henry	(Jamaica)	LB	8 July 1997 (aged 21)	Walsall	2016	
20	Josh Clarke	(England)	RB / RW	5 July 1994 (aged 24)	Academy	2013	Loaned to Burton Albion
22	Henrik Dalsgaard	(Denmark)	RB	27 July 1989 (aged 29)	Zulte Waregem	2017	
23	Julian Jeanvier	(Guinea)	CB	31 March 1992 (aged 26)	Reims	2018	
26	Ezri Konsa	(England)	CB	23 October 1997 (aged 20)	Charlton Athletic	2018	
29	Yoann Barbet	(France)	CB / LB	10 May 1993 (aged 25)	Chamois Niortais	2015	
30	Tom Field	(Republic of Ireland)	LB	14 March 1997 (aged 21)	Academy	2015	Loaned to Cheltenham Town
32	Luka Racic	(Denmark)	CB	8 May 1999 (aged 19)	FC Copenhagen	2018	
34	Mads Bech Sørensen	(Denmark)	LB / CB	7 January 1999 (aged 19)	AC Horsens	2017	
35	Canice Carroll	(Republic of Ireland)	CB	26 January 1999 (aged 19)	Oxford United	2018	Loaned to Swindon Town
Midfielders
4	Lewis Macleod	(Scotland)	LM / AM	16 June 1994 (aged 24)	Rangers	2015	
10	Josh McEachran	(England)	CM	1 March 1993 (aged 25)	Chelsea	2015	
12	Kamohelo Mokotjo	(South Africa)	DM	11 March 1991 (aged 27)	FC Twente	2017	
14	Josh Dasilva	(England)	AM / W	23 October 1998 (aged 19)	Arsenal	2018	
17	Emiliano Marcondes	(Denmark)	AM / FW / LW	9 March 1995 (aged 23)	Nordsjælland	2017	
19	Romaine Sawyers (c)	(Saint Kitts and Nevis)	AM / CM	2 November 1991 (aged 26)	Walsall	2016	
31	Reece Cole	(England)	CM	17 February 1998 (aged 20)	Academy	2016	Loaned to Yeovil Town, Maidenhead United and Macclesfield Town
36	Jaakko Oksanen	(Finland)	CM	7 November 2000 (aged 17)	HJK Helsinki	2018	
39	Jan Žambůrek	(Czech Republic)	CM	13 February 2001 (aged 17)	Slavia Prague	2018	
Attackers
7	Sergi Canós	(Spain)	W	2 February 1997 (aged 21)	Norwich City	2017	
9	Neal Maupay	(France)	FW	14 August 1996 (aged 21)	Saint-Étienne	2017	
11	Ollie Watkins	(England)	FW / LW / AM	30 December 1995 (aged 22)	Exeter City	2017	
21	Saïd Benrahma	(Algeria)	RW	10 August 1995 (aged 22)	OGC Nice	2018	
24	Chiedozie Ogbene	(Republic of Ireland)	W	1 May 1997 (aged 21)	Limerick	2018	Loaned to Exeter City
33	Marcus Forss	(Finland)	FW	18 June 1999 (aged 19)	West Bromwich Albion	2018	
38	Kolbeinn Finnsson	(Iceland)	W	25 August 1999 (aged 18)	FC Groningen	2018	Loaned to Fylkir
40	Theo Archibald	(Scotland)	W	5 March 1998 (aged 20)	Celtic	2017	
Players who left the club mid-season
6	Chris Mepham	(Wales)	CB	5 November 1997 (aged 20)	Academy	2016	Transferred to Bournemouth
8	Nico Yennaris	(China)	CM / RB	24 May 1993 (aged 25)	Arsenal	2014	Transferred to Beijing Sinobo Guoan
15	Ryan Woods	(England)	CM	13 December 1993 (aged 24)	Shrewsbury Town	2015	Loaned to Stoke City, transferred to Stoke City
18	Alan Judge	(Republic of Ireland)	AM / LM	11 November 1988 (aged 29)	Blackburn Rovers	2014	Transferred to Ipswich Town
37	Nikolaj Kirk	(Denmark)	RB / CM	19 March 1998 (aged 20)	FC Midtjylland	2018	Returned to FC Midtjylland after loan

== Statistics ==
=== Appearances and goals ===
Substitute appearances in brackets.

No	Pos	Nat	Name	League		FA Cup		League Cup		Total	
No	Pos	Nat	Name	Apps	Goals	Apps	Goals	Apps	Goals	Apps	Goals
1	GK	(England)	Dan Bentley	33	0	0	0	0	0	33	0
2	DF	(England)	Moses Odubajo	22 (8)	0	4	0	1	0	27 (8)	0
3	DF	(Jamaica)	Rico Henry	13 (1)	1	2	0	0	0	15 (1)	1
4	MF	(Scotland)	Lewis Macleod	12 (5)	3	0	0	1	0	13 (5)	3
6	DF	(Wales)	Chris Mepham	22	0	0	0	1 (1)	0	23 (1)	0
7	MF	(Spain)	Sergi Canós	26 (18)	7	4	2	1 (1)	0	31 (19)	9
8	MF	(China)	Nico Yennaris	9 (8)	0	0	0	3	0	12 (8)	0
9	FW	(France)	Neal Maupay	43	25	3 (1)	3	0 (2)	0	46 (3)	28
10	MF	(England)	Josh McEachran	19 (5)	1	3 (1)	0	1	0	23 (6)	1
11	MF	(England)	Ollie Watkins	36 (5)	10	3	2	1	0	40 (5)	12
12	MF	(South Africa)	Kamohelo Mokotjo	24 (10)	3	1	0	2	1	27 (10)	4
13	GK	(Iceland)	Patrik Gunnarsson	0 (1)	0	0	0	0	0	0 (1)	0
14	MF	(England)	Josh Dasilva	5 (12)	1	2 (2)	0	0	0	7 (14)	1
15	MF	(England)	Ryan Woods	0	0	—		1	0	1	0
17	MF	(Denmark)	Emiliano Marcondes	3 (10)	0	0	0	0	0	3 (10)	0
18	MF	(Republic of Ireland)	Alan Judge	4 (16)	1	0 (1)	0	3	1	7 (17)	2
19	MF	(Saint Kitts and Nevis)	Romaine Sawyers	41 (1)	0	2 (1)	0	1	0	44 (2)	0
20	DF	(England)	Josh Clarke	0 (1)	0	0	0	2	0	2 (1)	0
21	MF	(Algeria)	Saïd Benrahma	29 (9)	10	3 (1)	0	2 (1)	1	34 (11)	11
22	DF	(Denmark)	Henrik Dalsgaard	40	2	1 (1)	0	0 (1)	0	41 (2)	2
23	DF	(Guinea)	Julian Jeanvier	23 (1)	2	4	1	3	2	30 (1)	5
24	MF	(Republic of Ireland)	Chiedozie Ogbene	0 (4)	0	0 (2)	0	0 (1)	0	0 (7)	0
26	DF	(England)	Ezri Konsa	42	1	4	0	1	0	47	1
28	GK	(England)	Luke Daniels	12	0	4	0	3	0	19	0
29	DF	(France)	Yoann Barbet	30 (2)	1	3	0	1 (1)	0	34 (3)	1
30	DF	(Republic of Ireland)	Tom Field	0 (1)	0	—		2	0	2 (1)	0
32	DF	(Denmark)	Luka Racic	1 (1)	0	0	0	0	0	1 (1)	0
33	FW	(Finland)	Marcus Forss	1 (5)	1	0 (1)	0	2	1	3 (6)	2
34	DF	(Denmark)	Mads Bech Sørensen	7 (1)	0	1	0	1	0	9 (1)	0
36	MF	(Finland)	Jaakko Oksanen	0 (1)	0	0	0	0	0	0 (1)	0
39	MF	(Czech Republic)	Jan Žambůrek	0 (1)	0	0	0	0	0	0 (1)	0
Players loaned in during the season
37	DF	(Denmark)	Nikolaj Kirk	0	0	0 (1)	0	0	0	0 (1)	0

- Maximum 45 league appearances in season
- Players listed in italics left the club mid-season
- Source: Soccerbase

=== Goalscorers ===
No	Pos	Nat	Player	Lg.	FAC	FLC	Total
9	FW	(France)	Neal Maupay	25	3	0	28
11	MF	(England)	Ollie Watkins	10	2	0	12
21	MF	(Algeria)	Saïd Benrahma	10	0	1	11
7	MF	(Spain)	Sergi Canós	7	2	0	9
23	DF	(Guinea)	Julian Jeanvier	2	1	2	5
12	MF	(South Africa)	Kamohelo Mokotjo	3	0	1	4
4	MF	(Scotland)	Lewis Macleod	3	0	0	3
22	DF	(Denmark)	Henrik Dalsgaard	2	0	0	2
33	FW	(Finland)	Marcus Forss	1	0	1	2
18	MF	(Republic of Ireland)	Alan Judge	1	0	1	2
29	DF	(France)	Yoann Barbet	1	0	0	1
14	MF	(England)	Josh Dasilva	1	0	0	1
3	DF	(Jamaica)	Rico Henry	1	0	0	1
26	DF	(England)	Ezri Konsa	1	0	0	1
10	MF	(England)	Josh McEachran	1	0	0	1
Opponents				3	0	0	3
Awarded				1	—	—	1
Total				72	8	6	86

- Players listed in italics left the club mid-season
- Source: Soccerbase

=== Discipline ===
No	Pos	Nat	Player	FLCh.		FAC		FLCu.		Total		Pts
No	Pos	Nat	Player	Booked	Sent off (straight red)	Booked	Sent off (straight red)	Booked	Sent off (straight red)	Booked	Sent off (straight red)	Pts
22	DF	(Denmark)	Henrik Dalsgaard	11	1	0	0	0	0	11	1	14
19	MF	(Saint Kitts and Nevis)	Romaine Sawyers	9	0	1	0	0	0	10	0	10
9	FW	(France)	Neal Maupay	9	0	0	0	0	0	9	0	9
26	DF	(England)	Ezri Konsa	4	0	1	1	1	0	6	1	9
6	DF	(Wales)	Chris Mepham	4	1	0	0	0	0	4	1	7
29	DF	(France)	Yoann Barbet	5	0	1	0	0	0	6	0	6
11	MF	(England)	Ollie Watkins	5	0	0	0	0	0	5	0	5
21	MF	(Algeria)	Saïd Benrahma	2	1	0	0	0	0	2	1	5
23	DF	(Guinea)	Julian Jeanvier	4	0	0	0	0	0	4	0	4
2	DF	(England)	Moses Odubajo	3	0	1	0	0	0	4	0	4
34	DF	(Denmark)	Mads Bech Sørensen	3	0	1	0	0	0	4	0	4
7	MF	(Spain)	Sergi Canós	2	0	1	0	0	0	3	0	3
3	DF	(Jamaica)	Rico Henry	2	0	0	0	0	0	2	0	2
18	MF	(Republic of Ireland)	Alan Judge	2	0	0	0	0	0	2	0	2
4	MF	(Scotland)	Lewis Macleod	2	0	0	0	0	0	2	0	2
10	MF	(England)	Josh McEachran	2	0	0	0	0	0	2	0	2
8	MF	(China)	Nico Yennaris	2	0	0	0	0	0	2	0	2
28	GK	(England)	Luke Daniels	1	0	0	0	0	0	1	0	1
17	MF	(Denmark)	Emiliano Marcondes	1	0	0	0	0	0	1	0	1
Total				73	3	6	1	1	0	80	4	92

- Players listed in italics left the club mid-season.
- Source: ESPN

=== International caps ===
No	Pos	Nat	Player	Caps	Goals	Ref
6	DF	(Wales)	Chris Mepham	2	0	
12	MF	(South Africa)	Kamohelo Mokotjo	10	0	
18	MF	(Republic of Ireland)	Alan Judge	1	0	
19	MF	(Saint Kitts and Nevis)	Romaine Sawyers	4	0	
21	MF	(Algeria)	Saïd Benrahma	1	0	
22	DF	(Denmark)	Henrik Dalsgaard	6	1	
23	DF	(Guinea)	Julian Jeanvier	3	0	
38	MF	(Iceland)	Kolbeinn Finnsson	2	0	

- Players listed in italics left the club mid-season.
- Only international caps won while contracted to Brentford are counted.

== Coaching staff ==
=== Dean Smith (4 August – 10 October 2018) ===
Name	Role
(England) Dean Smith	Head coach
(Denmark) Thomas Frank	Assistant head coach
(England) Richard O'Kelly	Assistant head coach
(Spain) Iñaki Caña	Goalkeeper Coach
(France) Nicolas Jover	Set-Piece Coach
(England) Chris Haslam	Head of Athletic Performance
(England) Luke Stopforth	Head of Analysis
(Denmark) Lars Friis	Individual Development Coach

=== Thomas Frank (16 October 2018 – 5 May 2019) ===
Name	Role
(Denmark) Thomas Frank	Head coach
(Republic of Ireland) Kevin O'Connor	Assistant head coach
(Denmark) Brian Riemer	Assistant head coach
(Spain) Iñaki Caña	Goalkeeper Coach
(France) Nicolas Jover	Set-Piece Coach
(England) Chris Haslam	Head of Athletic Performance
(England) Luke Stopforth	Head of Analysis

Sources: brentfordfc.com, brentfordfc.com

== Kit ==
Supplier: adidas
Sponsor(s): LeoVegas

Home	Away

Source: Brentford F.C.

== Awards ==
- Supporters' Player of the Year: Neal Maupay
- Players' Player of the Year: Neal Maupay
- London Football Awards Player of the Year: Neal Maupay
- EFL Championship Goal of the Month: Saïd Benrahma (February 2019)
