= Julian Jeanvier =

Guinean footballer (born 1992)

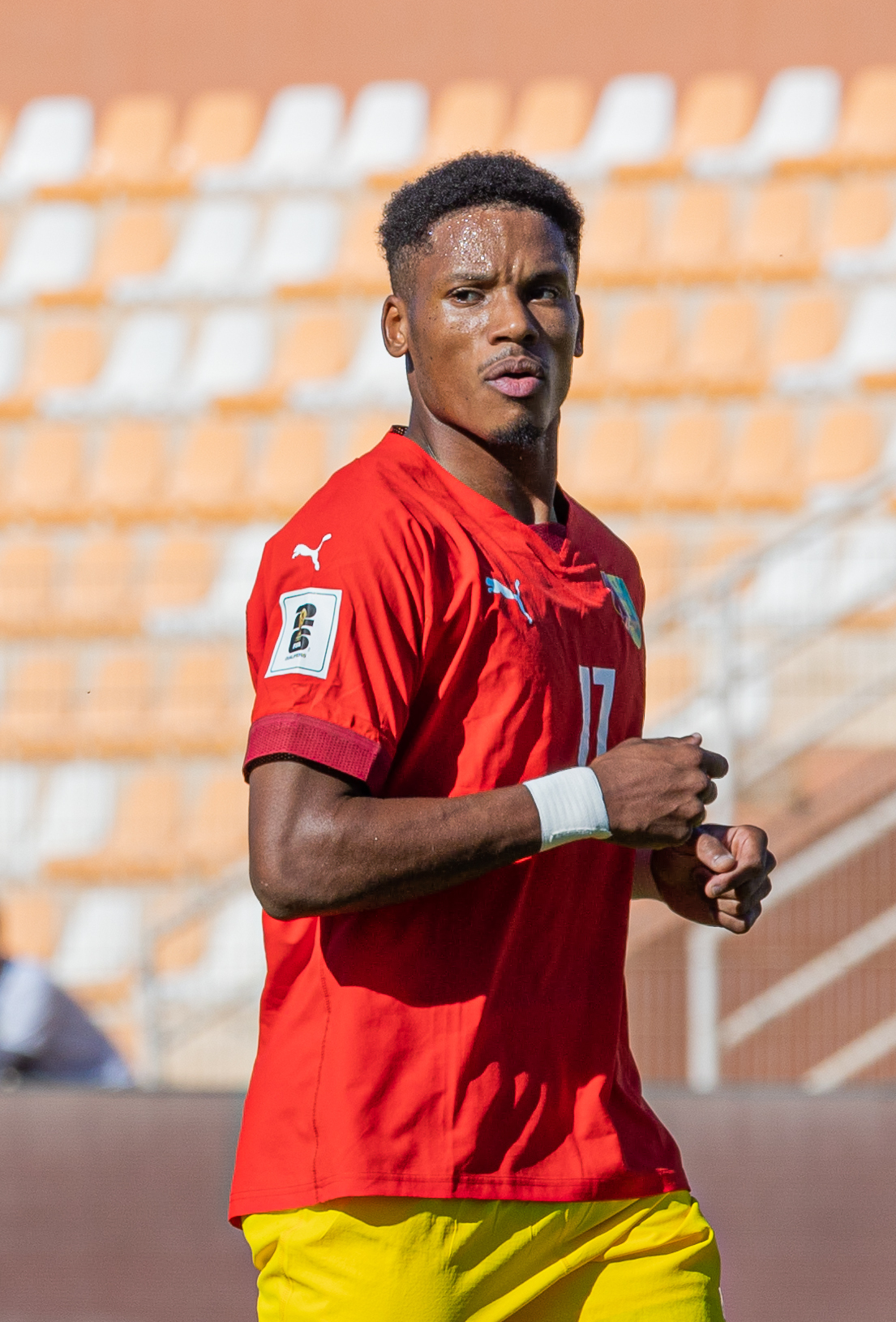
- Jeanvier playing for Guinea in 2024

Personal information
- Full name: Julian Marc Jeanvier
- Date of birth: 31 March 1992 (age 34)
- Place of birth: Clichy, France
- Height: 1.85 m (6 ft 1 in)
- Position: Central defender

Youth career
- 2000–2006: US Clichy-sur-Seine
- 2005–2008: INF Clairefontaine
- 2006–2007: Entente SSG
- 2008–2009: Nancy

Senior career*
| Years | Team | Apps | (Gls) |
| 2009–2013 | Nancy B | 54 | (2) |
| 2013 | Nancy | 6 | (0) |
| 2013–2016 | Lille B | 22 | (0) |
| 2014–2015 | → Mouscron-Péruwelz (loan) | 17 | (0) |
| 2015–2016 | → Red Star (loan) | 24 | (2) |
| 2016–2018 | Reims | 62 | (5) |
| 2018–2022 | Brentford | 50 | (3) |
| 2020–2021 | → Kasımpaşa (loan) | 4 | (0) |
| 2022–2023 | Auxerre | 22 | (1) |
| 2023 | Auxerre II | 1 | (0) |
| 2023–2025 | Kayserispor | 27 | (1) |
| 2025–2026 | Gulf United | 6 | (1) |

International career^{‡}
| 2019– | Guinea | 18 | (0) |
- * Club domestic league appearances and goals as of 19:52, 10 September 2026 (UTC) ‡ National team caps and goals as of 12:40, 21 November 2025 (UTC)

Julian Marc Jeanvier (born 31 March 1992) is a professional footballer who plays as a central defender. Born in France, he plays for the Guinea national team at international level.

Jeanvier rose to prominence in his native France with Reims, before joining English club Brentford in 2018. He returned to France to join Auxerre in 2022, before returning to Turkey (where he had previously played on loan for Kasımpaşa) to join Kayserispor in 2023. He won his maiden international cap for Guinea in 2019 and was a member of the nation's 2019 and 2023 Africa Cup of Nations squads.

== Club career ==
=== Early years and Nancy ===
A central defender, Jeanvier began his career in 2000 with hometown club US Clichy-sur-Seine. He moved to L'Entente SSG in 2006 and trained concurrently at Clairefontaine, before joining the academy at Nancy in 2008. Jeanvier progressed into the reserve team and made 54 appearances and scored two goals in the Championnat de France Amateur between 2009 and 2013. The appointment of former head of youth Patrick Gabriel as first team manager midway through the 2012–13 Ligue 1 season saw Jeanvier promoted into the first team squad and he made 10 appearances between January and April 2013. He refused the offer of a new two-year contract extension and departed the Stade Marcel Picot at the end of the 2012–13 season.

=== Lille ===
Jeanvier joined Ligue 1 club Lille on a four-year contract during the 2013 off-season. Behind Simon Kjær, Marko Baša, David Rozehnal and Adama Soumaoro in the central defensive pecking order, he was completely out of favour with manager René Girard, who had replaced Rudi Garcia soon after Jeanvier's arrival at the Stade Pierre-Mauroy. He instead played for the reserve team and spent the 2014–15 and 2015–16 seasons on loan at Mouscron-Péruwelz and Red Star respectively. He failed to make a first team appearance and left the club in August 2016.

=== Reims ===
In August 2016, Jeanvier dropped into Ligue 2 to join Reims. He established himself in the starting lineup and was voted into the UNFP Ligue 2 Team of the Year at the end of the 2016–17 and 2017–18 seasons. Jeanvier had a successful 2017–18 season, vice-captaining the team and helping the club to the Ligue 2 championship and promotion to Ligue 1. He departed the Stade Auguste-Delaune in July 2018, after making 67 appearances and scoring five goals for the club.

=== Brentford ===
==== 2018–19 season ====
On 30 July 2018, Jeanvier moved to England to join Championship club Brentford on a four-year contract, with the option of a further year, for an undisclosed fee, speculated to be £1.8 million. He scored a goal in each of his first two appearances for the club, which came in the early rounds of the EFL Cup, but a foot injury suffered in October 2018 ruled him out for two months. The unavailability of Chris Mepham and new head coach Thomas Frank's deployment of three centre backs saw Jeanvier win a starting place on his return to fitness in December 2018 and he remained a near-constant starter until the end of the 2018–19 season.

==== 2019–2021 and loan to Kasımpaşa ====
Despite being behind Pontus Jansson and Ethan Pinnock in the pecking order when either was available, Jeanvier made 27 appearances and scored one goal during the 2019–20 season, but he did not feature during the Bees' unsuccessful playoff campaign.

After the signing of Charlie Goode during the 2020 off-season saw Jeanvier demoted further down the pecking order, he joined Turkish Süper Lig club Kasımpaşa on loan for the duration of the 2020–21 season. In late October 2020, after making four appearances, he suffered a season-ending ruptured anterior cruciate ligament injury. In his absence, Brentford won promotion to the Premier League after victory in the 2021 Championship playoff Final.

==== 2021–22 season ====
Jeanvier was included in Brentford's 25-man Premier League squad for the 2021–22 season and by mid-November 2021, he had returned to non-contact training. He made his return to non-competitive match play with Brentford B in late March 2022. On 10 April 2022, illness suffered by Pontus Jansson saw Jeanvier named in a matchday squad for the first time since the 2020 Championship play-off final and he remained an unused substitute during a 2–0 Premier League victory over West Ham United. He was an unused substitute during five further matches before the end of the Premier League season and was released when his contract expired. During four seasons with Brentford, Jeanvier made 58 appearances and scored six goals.

=== Auxerre ===
In July 2022, Jeanvier joined Championship club Reading on trial and took part in the club's St George's Park training camp, but was not offered a contract. On 18 July 2022, he joined newly promoted Ligue 1 club Auxerre on a two-week trial and signed a one-year contract, with a one-year option, on 2 August 2022. Jeanvier made 24 appearances and scored one goal during a 2022–23 season in which the club suffered relegation back to Ligue 2. He was released when the club declined to take up the option on his contract.

=== Kayserispor ===
On 16 September 2023, Jeanvier returned to Turkey to sign a two-year contract with Süper Lig club Kayserispor on a free transfer. He made 14 appearances and scored one goal during a 2023–24 season in which the club narrowly avoided relegation. Either side of three months out with a medial collateral ligament problem in his left knee, Jeanvier made 14 appearances during the 2024–25 season and was released when his contract expired. As a result of a delayed payment of €135,000 to Jeanvier, the club was subsequently banned from participating in three transfer windows.

=== Gulf United ===
In late September 2025, Jeanvier signed a contract with UAE First Division League club Gulf United on a free transfer. He made six appearances and scored one goal prior to his unannounced departure from the club.

== International career ==
Jeanvier was a member of the France U18 squad which finished runners-up at the 2010 Copa del Atlántico, but he failed to win a cap. He made his debut for Guinea in a 1–0 friendly defeat to Gambia on 7 June 2019 and made one appearance at the 2019 Africa Cup of Nations. Following 2 1/2 years out of international contention, Jeanvier was recalled to the squad for two 2023 Africa Cup of Nations qualifiers in June 2022. He remained an unused substitute during the first match, before departing the squad for personal reasons. Four years after his previous cap, Jeanvier was recalled to the Guinea squad for two 2026 World Cup qualifiers in November 2023, both of which he started in. Jeanvier was named in Guinea's 2023 Africa Cup of Nations squad and made four appearances during the team's run to the quarter-finals.

== Coaching career ==
Jeanvier opened an academy in Dubai in 2026.

== Personal life ==
Jeanvier was born in metropolitan France and is of Guinean and Guadeloupean descent. His father was also a footballer and played for Red Star. He is married to a Guinean woman and has a Guinean passport.

== Career statistics ==
=== Club ===
As of match played 16 February 2026

Appearances and goals by club, season and competition
| Club | Season | League | | | National cup (Note: Includes Coupe de France, FA Cup, Turkish Cup) | | League cup (Note: Includes Coupe de la Ligue, EFL Cup) | | Other | | Total | |
| Club | Season | Division | Apps | Goals | Apps | Goals | Apps | Goals | Apps | Goals | Apps | Goals |
|---|---|---|---|---|---|---|---|---|---|---|---|---|
| Nancy II | 2009–10 | CFA Group A | 6 | 0 | — | | — | | — | | 6 | 0 |
| Nancy II | 2010–11 | CFA Group B | 16 | 1 | — | | — | | — | | 16 | 1 |
| Nancy II | 2011–12 | CFA Group B | 14 | 0 | — | | — | | — | | 14 | 0 |
| Nancy II | 2012–13 | CFA Group B | 18 | 1 | — | | — | | — | | 18 | 1 |
| Nancy II | Total | | 54 | 2 | — | | — | | — | | 54 | 2 |
| Nancy | 2012–13 | Ligue 1 | 6 | 0 | 0 | 0 | 4 | 0 | — | | 10 | 0 |
| Lille | 2013–14 | Ligue 1 | 0 | 0 | 0 | 0 | 0 | 0 | — | | 0 | 0 |
| Lille II | 2013–14 | CFA Group A | 21 | 0 | — | | — | | — | | 21 | 0 |
| Lille II | 2015–16 | CFA 2 Group G | 1 | 0 | — | | — | | — | | 1 | 0 |
| Lille II | Total | | 22 | 0 | — | | — | | — | | 22 | 0 |
| Mouscron-Péruwelz (loan) | 2014–15 | Belgian Pro League | 17 | 0 | 0 | 0 | — | | — | | 17 | 0 |
| Red Star (loan) | 2015–16 | Ligue 2 | 24 | 2 | 0 | 0 | — | | — | | 24 | 2 |
| Reims | 2016–17 | Ligue 2 | 29 | 3 | 0 | 0 | 1 | 0 | — | | 30 | 3 |
| Reims | 2017–18 | Ligue 2 | 33 | 2 | 2 | 0 | 2 | 0 | — | | 37 | 2 |
| Reims | Total | | 62 | 5 | 2 | 0 | 3 | 0 | — | | 67 | 5 |
| Brentford | 2018–19 | Championship | 24 | 2 | 4 | 1 | 3 | 2 | — | | 31 | 5 |
| Brentford | 2019–20 | Championship | 26 | 1 | 1 | 0 | 0 | 0 | 0 | 0 | 27 | 1 |
| Brentford | 2021–22 | Premier League | 0 | 0 | 0 | 0 | 0 | 0 | — | | 0 | 0 |
| Brentford | Total | | 50 | 3 | 5 | 1 | 3 | 2 | 0 | 0 | 58 | 6 |
| Kasımpaşa (loan) | 2020–21 | Süper Lig | 4 | 0 | 0 | 0 | — | | — | | 4 | 0 |
| AJ Auxerre | 2022–23 | Ligue 1 | 22 | 1 | 2 | 0 | — | | — | | 24 | 1 |
| AJ Auxerre II | 2022–23 | Championnat National 2 Group C | 1 | 0 | — | | — | | — | | 1 | 0 |
| Kayserispor | 2023–24 | Süper Lig | 13 | 1 | 1 | 0 | — | | — | | 14 | 1 |
| Kayserispor | 2024–25 | Süper Lig | 14 | 0 | 0 | 0 | — | | — | | 14 | 0 |
| Kayserispor | Total | | 27 | 1 | 1 | 0 | — | | — | | 28 | 1 |
| Gulf United | 2025–26 | UAE First Division League | 6 | 1 | — | | — | | — | | 6 | 1 |
| Career total | | | 295 | 15 | 10 | 1 | 10 | 2 | 0 | 0 | 315 | 18 |

=== International ===
As of match played 18 November 2025

Appearances and goals by national team and year
| National team | Year | Apps | Goals |
|---|---|---|---|
| Guinea | 2019 | 6 | 0 |
| Guinea | 2023 | 2 | 0 |
| Guinea | 2024 | 8 | 0 |
| Guinea | 2025 | 2 | 0 |
| Total | | 18 | 0 |

== Honours ==
Reims

- Ligue 2: 2017–18

Individual

- UNFP Ligue 2 Team of the Year: 2016–17, 2017–18
