= Gustav Mogensen =

Danish footballer (born 2001)

Personal information
- Full name: Gustav Busch Trend Mogensen
- Date of birth: 19 April 2001 (age 25)
- Place of birth: Pindstrup, Denmark
- Height: 1.90 m (6 ft 3 in)
- Position: Forward

Team information
- Current team: Ranheim
- Number: 27

Youth career
- 2012–2019: AGF Aarhus
- –2016: IF Midtdjurs
- 2019–2022: Brentford

Senior career*
Years	Team	Apps	(Gls)
2022–2023	Sarpsborg 08 2	11	(5)
2022–2023	Sarpsborg 08	1	(0)
2023	→ Hødd (loan)	15	(4)
2024–	Ranheim	40	(7)

International career
2017	Denmark U16	7	(0)
2017–2018	Denmark U17	13	(5)
2018–2019	Denmark U18	4	(1)
2019–2020	Denmark U19	11	(3)
- * Club domestic league appearances and goals as of 13:23, 8 November 2026 (UTC)

Gustav Mogensen (born 19 April 2001) is a Danish professional footballer who plays as a forward for Norwegian First Division club Ranheim.

Mogensen is a product of the AGF Aarhus academy and began his professional career with Brentford in 2019. After an injury-hit spell, he began his senior career with Sarpsborg 08 in 2022. After failing to break into the first team squad, he transferred to Ranheim in 2023. Mogensen was capped by Denmark at youth level.

== Club career ==
=== Early years ===
A forward, Mogensen joined Danish Superliga club AGF Aarhus in 2012 and progressed sufficiently with partner club IF Midtdjurs to sign a 2 1/2-year youth contract with AGF in November 2016. He graduated to the reserve team during the 2018–19 season and was an unused substitute for the first team during a 5–1 Danish Cup third round victory over Aarhus Fremad on 26 September 2018. Entering the final six months of his contract, Mogensen transferred out of Ceres Park in January 2019.

=== Brentford ===
On 31 January 2019, Mogensen joined the B team at Championship club Brentford on a 2 1/2-year contract, with the option for a further year, for a fee reported to be 2 million kr. He scored one of the goals in Brentford B's 4–0 2019 Middlesex Senior Cup Final victory over Harrow Borough on 16 April 2019 and finished the 2018–19 season with 14 appearances and three goals. On 7 December 2019, mounting injuries saw Mogensen win his maiden call into the first team squad and he remained an unused substitute during a 2–1 defeat to Sheffield Wednesday. Mogensen scored 16 goals in 34 B team appearances during the 2019–20 season, but his count dropped to 14 appearances and six goals during an injury-hit 2020–21 season. The one-year option on his contract was taken up in June 2021.

Mogensen made a substitute appearance during the first team's opening match of the 2021–22 pre-season, but 55 minutes into his second pre-season appearance for the B team, he suffered an anterior cruciate ligament injury and a meniscus tear. Following surgery in August 2021, Mogensen had recovered sufficiently to be included in the travelling party for the Atlantic Cup in February 2022, though he did not play. Though his contract expired at the end of the 2021–22 season, Mogensen remained with the club in order to complete his rehabilitation.

=== Sarpsborg 08 ===
On 7 July 2022, Mogensen moved to Norway and signed a three-year contract with Eliteserien club Sarpsborg 08, effective 1 August 2022. He commenced training with the club on 7 September, but was not considered for first team selection during the remainder of the 2022 season, due to the quota on the number of non-Norwegians allowed in Eliteserien squads. He returned to match play with the reserve team and scored two goals in the final three Third Division matches of the season.

Mogensen began the 2023 season making appearances for the reserve team, while regularly being an unused substitute for the first team. He made just two first team appearances prior to 1 August 2023, when he departed to join First Division club IL Hødd on loan until the end of the season. He scored four goals in 17 appearances during a spell which culminated in relegation to the Second Division through a playoff. Mogensen transferred out of Sarpsborg 08 in December 2023.

=== Ranheim ===
On 20 December 2023, Mogensen transferred to First Division club Ranheim and signed a three-year contract for an undisclosed fee, effective 1 January 2024. He ended a mid-table 2024 season with 33 appearances and seven goals. On 29 April 2025, during his sixth appearance of the 2025 season, Mogensen suffered a season-ending cruciate ligament injury. He returned to match play in September 2026.

== International career ==
Mogensen has been capped by Denmark between U16 and U19 level. He was a part of the Danish 2018 UEFA European U17 Championship squad and made two appearances at the tournament.

== Career statistics ==
As of match played 8 November 2026

Appearances and goals by club, season and competition
Club	Season	League			National cup (Note: Includes Danish Cup, FA Cup, Norwegian Cup)		League cup (Note: Includes EFL Cup)		Other		Total	
Club	Season	Division	Apps	Goals	Apps	Goals	Apps	Goals	Apps	Goals	Apps	Goals
AGF Aarhus	2018–19	Danish Superliga	0	0	0	0	—		—		0	0
Brentford	2019–20	Championship	0	0	0	0	0	0	0	0	0	0
Sarpsborg 08 2	2022	Norwegian Third Division Group 4	3	2	—		—		—		3	2
Sarpsborg 08 2	2023	Norwegian Third Division Group 6	8	3	—		—		—		8	3
Sarpsborg 08 2	Total		11	5	—		—		—		11	5
Sarpsborg 08	2023	Eliteserien	1	0	1	0	—		—		2	0
IL Hødd (loan)	2023	Norwegian First Division	15	4	—		—		2 (Note: Appearances in Norwegian First Division relegation play-offs)	0	17	4
Ranheim	2024	Norwegian First Division	30	4	3	3	—		—		33	7
Ranheim	2025	Norwegian First Division	4	0	2	1	—		—		6	1
Ranheim	2026	Norwegian First Division	6	3	2	0	—		—		8	3
Ranheim	Total		40	7	7	4	—		—		47	11
Ranheim 2	2024	Norwegian Fourth Division Trøndelag Group 2	2	4	—		—		—		2	4
Ranheim 2	2026	Norwegian Third Division Group 2	1	0	—		—		—		1	0
Ranheim 2	Total		3	4	—		—		—		3	4
Career total			70	21	8	4	0	0	2	0	80	25

== Honours ==
Brentford B

- Middlesex Senior Cup: 2018–19

Denmark U19

- Nordic Friendship Tournament: 2019
