= Josh Clarke (footballer, born 1994) =

English footballer

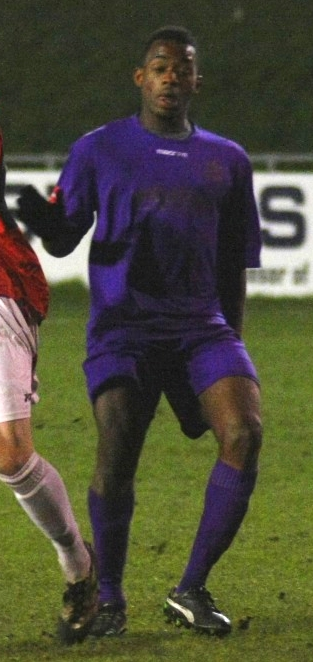
- Clarke playing for Carshalton Athletic in 2013.

Personal information
- Full name: Joshua Joseph Jason Ishmel Clarke
- Date of birth: 5 July 1994 (age 32)
- Place of birth: Walthamstow, England
- Height: 5 ft 8 in (1.73 m)
- Positions: Right back; right winger

Team information
- Current team: Grimsby Borough

Youth career
- 2011–2013: Brentford

Senior career*
Years	Team	Apps	(Gls)
2013–2020	Brentford	72	(3)
2012–2013	→ Carshalton Athletic (loan)	7	(1)
2013	→ Carshalton Athletic (loan)	10	(0)
2013–2014	→ Maidenhead United (loan)	2	(0)
2014	→ Braintree Town (loan)	0	(0)
2014	→ Dagenham & Redbridge (loan)	0	(0)
2014	→ Stevenage (loan)	1	(0)
2015–2016	→ Barnet (loan)	10	(3)
2019	→ Burton Albion (loan)	6	(0)
2020	Wigan Athletic	0	(0)
2021–2022	Dartford	5	(0)
2026–	Grimsby Borough	2	(0)
- * Club domestic league appearances and goals as of 22:30, 22 August 2026 (UTC)

Joshua Joseph Jason Ishmel Clarke (born 5 July 1994) is an English former professional footballer who plays as a right back or right winger for Northern Premier League Division One East club Grimsby Borough.

Clarke is a graduate of the Brentford youth system and made over 70 English Football League appearances for the club between 2013 and his departure in 2020. After nearly two years out of the game (bisected by a non-playing spell with Wigan Athletic), Clarke dropped into non-League football to transfer to Dartford in 2021, for whom he played until early 2022. After four years out of the game, Clarke returned to non-League football with Grimsby Borough in 2026.

== Career ==
=== Brentford ===
==== Early years (2011–2013) ====
Clarke signed a two-year scholarship at League One club Brentford during the 2011 off-season, after being spotted while on a course at Southgate College. He also represented Middlesex Schools at U17 level. Clarke progressed from the youth team to the Development Squad and played the first senior football of his career for Isthmian League Premier Division club Carshalton Athletic on two work experience loans during the 2012–13 season. He made 17 league appearances and scored one goal during a season to forget for the club, in which it narrowly avoided relegation.

==== Loan spells (2013–2015) ====
Clarke signed a one-year professional contract for the 2013–14 season and made two cup appearances during the early months of the campaign. Mid-season loans with Conference South club Maidenhead United and Conference Premier club Braintree Town respectively yielded just two appearances, After finishing the 2013–14 season as the leading appearance-maker in the Brentford Development Squad, Clarke was promoted into the first team squad for the remainder of the League One season on 16 April 2014. With promotion to the Championship secured, he made his league debut when he replaced right back Nico Yennaris after 81 minutes of a 4–1 defeat to Colchester United 10 days later.

Clarke signed a new a one-year contract on 9 June 2014 and joined League Two club Dagenham & Redbridge on a 28-day youth loan on 22 August 2014. His only involvement with the first team came when he was an unused substitute during the following day's match versus Mansfield Town. Failure to recover from a thigh injury saw Clarke return to Brentford when his loan expired. He failed to feature at all in the first team during the 2014–15 season. He made 19 Development Squad appearances during the season, moved from right wing to right back and impressed sufficiently to sign a new one-year extension in late June 2015.

==== Fringe player (2015–16) ====
Clarke made his first senior Brentford appearance in over 15 months in the League Cup first round versus Oxford United on 11 August 2015 and was one of the few Bees players to offer any spark in the 4–0 defeat. An injury crisis saw him keep his place in the squad throughout August and September and he made three further appearances before departing join League Two club Barnet on loan on 15 October 2015. Clarke returned to Brentford when his loan expired on 3 January 2016, after making 10 appearances and scoring three goals. Nearly five months since his previous involvement, injury to right back Maxime Colin and the deployment of right back Nico Yennaris as a defensive midfielder saw Clarke embark on a run of 8 late-season appearances, which took his tally for 2015–16 to 12.

==== Breakthrough (2016–2018) ====
On 29 June 2016, Clarke signed a new two-year contract. He was an ever-present inclusion in matchday squads early in the 2016–17 season and scored his first goal for the club in a 4–1 victory over Reading on 27 September 2016. He scored again five matches later, with the opener in a 2–0 West London derby victory over Queen's Park Rangers. In mid-February 2017, he signed a new two-year contract extension. After a period on the bench, he broke back into the team late in the season and finished 2016–17 with 32 appearances and two goals.

Clarke began the 2017–18 season down the pecking order on the right side of defence and midfield, but he started in Brentford's EFL Cup matches in the opening weeks of the campaign. He scored his first goal of the season in the 4–1 EFL Cup second round victory over rivals Queens Park Rangers on 22 August 2017 and his performance was recognised with a place in the Team of the Round. He scored two goals in two matches in mid-September, in a 1–1 league draw with Reading and a late consolation in a 3–1 EFL Cup third round defeat to Norwich City. After showing his versatility playing at right back and on both wings so far during the season, Clarke then deputised at left back following a season-ending injury suffered by Rico Henry on 30 September. Clarke's performances during the first half of the season were recognised with a nomination for EFL Player of the Year at the 2017–18 London Football Awards and he finished the campaign with 32 appearances and three goals.

==== Later years (2018–2020) ====
Manager Dean Smith's decision to establish a leadership group and appoint matchday captains during the 2018–19 season led to Clarke wearing the captain's armband for the first time in his Brentford career during a 1–0 EFL Cup second round victory over Cheltenham Town on 28 August 2018. Well down the pecking order, Clarke made just three appearances before joining League One club Burton Albion on loan until the end of the 2018–19 season on 11 January 2019. Either side of an ankle injury, he made just six appearances during his spell.

Well-down the pecking order, injury-troubled and having made just two appearances so far during the 2019–20 season, Clarke was made available for transfer during the winter transfer window in January 2020. On the final day of the window, his contract was terminated by mutual consent. Clarke made 84 appearances and scored five goals during 7 1/2-years as a professional at Griffin Park.

=== Wigan Athletic ===
On 11 September 2020, Clarke signed a one-month contract with newly relegated League One club Wigan Athletic. A hamstring injury saw him fail to win a call into a matchday squad and his contract was terminated by mutual consent on 5 October.

=== Leyton Orient (trial) ===
In July 2021, Clarke signed a short-term contract as a trialist with League Two club Leyton Orient and he appeared in all but one of the club's 2021–22 pre-season friendlies.

=== Dartford ===
In mid-November 2021, Clarke signed a contract with National League South club Dartford. He made 10 appearances before departing the club in February 2022, in order "to focus on resolving some injury issues and getting fit for next season". He was a part of the team which emerged victorious in the delayed 2020 Kent Senior Cup Final, played on 24 November 2021.

=== Grimsby Borough ===
Clarke returned to football in July 2026, when he transferred to Northern Premier League First Division East club Grimsby Borough.

== Career statistics ==
As of match played 15 August 2026

Appearances and goals by club, season and competition
Club	Season	League			FA Cup		League Cup		Other		Total	
Club	Season	Division	Apps	Goals	Apps	Goals	Apps	Goals	Apps	Goals	Apps	Goals
Brentford	2013–14	League One	1	0	0	0	1	0	1 (Note: 1 appearance in Football League Trophy)	0	3	0
Brentford	2015–16	Championship	11	0	0	0	1	0	—		12	0
Brentford	2016–17	Championship	30	2	1	0	1	0	—		32	2
Brentford	2017–18	Championship	28	1	1	0	3	2	—		32	3
Brentford	2018–19	Championship	1	0	0	0	2	0	—		3	0
Brentford	2019–20	Championship	1	0	0	0	1	0	—		2	0
Brentford	Total		72	3	2	0	9	2	1	0	84	5
Carshalton Athletic (loan)	2012–13	Isthmian League Premier Division	17	1	—		—		—		17	1
Maidenhead United (loan)	2013–14	Conference South	2	0	—		—		—		2	0
Dagenham & Redbridge (loan)	2014–15	League Two	0	0	—		—		—		0	0
Stevenage (loan)	2014–15	League Two	1	0	0	0	—		—		1	0
Barnet (loan)	2015–16	League Two	10	3	0	0	—		—		10	3
Burton Albion (loan)	2018–19	League One	6	0	—		—		—		6	0
Dartford	2021–22	National League South	5	0	—		—		5 (Note: 3 appearances in FA Trophy, 1 appearance in Kent Senior Cup, 1 appearance in London Senior Cup)	0	10	0
Grimsby Borough	2026–27	Northern Premier League First Division East	2	0	0	0	—		0	0	2	0
Career total			115	7	2	0	9	2	6	0	132	9

== Honours ==
Dartford

- Kent Senior Cup: 2019–20
