= Saïd Benrahma =

Algerian footballer (born 1995)

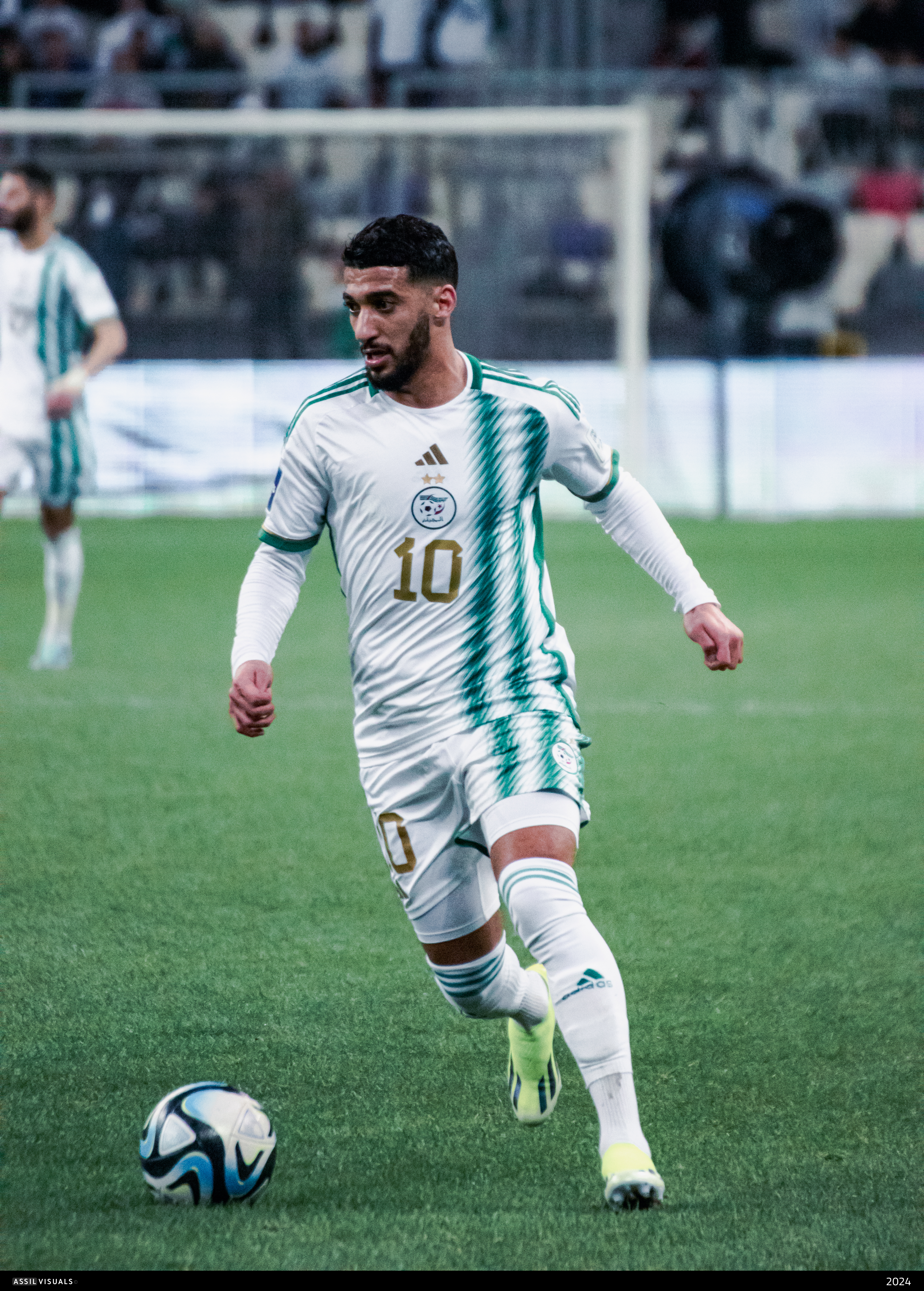
- Benrahma playing for Algeria in 2024

Personal information
- Full name: Mohamed Saïd Benrahma
- Date of birth: 10 August 1995 (age 31)
- Place of birth: Aïn Témouchent, Algeria
- Height: 1.72 m (5 ft 8 in)
- Positions: Left winger; attacking midfielder

Team information
- Current team: Neom
- Number: 10

Youth career
- 2004–2006: NRB Bethioua
- 2010–2011: Balma
- 2011–2013: Colomiers
- 2013: Nice

Senior career*
Years	Team	Apps	(Gls)
2013–2016	Nice II	37	(11)
2013–2018	Nice	17	(3)
2016	→ Angers (loan)	12	(1)
2016	→ Angers II (loan)	3	(1)
2017	→ Gazélec (loan)	15	(3)
2017–2018	→ Châteauroux (loan)	31	(9)
2018–2021	Brentford	83	(27)
2020–2021	→ West Ham United (loan)	30	(1)
2021–2024	West Ham United	80	(14)
2024	→ Lyon (loan)	12	(3)
2024–2025	Lyon	13	(1)
2025	→ Neom (loan)	16	(7)
2025–	Neom	34	(14)

International career^{‡}
2015–	Algeria	40	(4)
- * Club domestic league appearances and goals as of 17:54, 30 October 2026 (UTC) ‡ National team caps and goals as of 23:58, 8 September 2025 (UTC)

Mohamed Saïd Benrahma (Arabic: مُحَمَّد سَعِيد بْن رَحْمَة; born 10 August 1995) is an Algerian professional footballer who plays as a left winger or attacking midfielder for Saudi Pro League club Neom and the Algeria national team.

Benrahma began his professional career with Ligue 1 side Nice, later spending time on loan with fellow French clubsAngers, Gazélec and Châteauroux during his early career. He came to prominence in the EFL Championship after a move to Brentford in 2018, scoring 27 goals in 83 appearances for the West London outfit before moving on loan to fellow London side West Ham United in the Premier League in October 2020. He later joined the club permanently in January 2021 following a subsequent loan cancellation. In June 2024, Lyon exercised their purchase option and signed him on a permanent basis following a successful loan spell.

== Club career ==
=== Nice ===
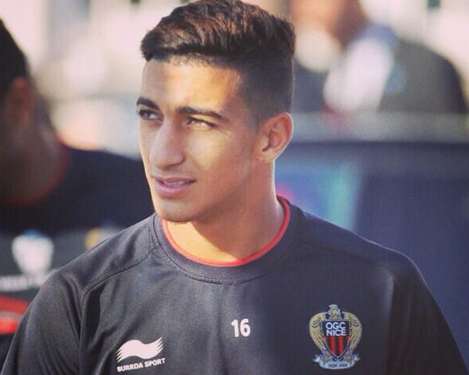
Benrahma in 2015

A winger, Benrahma began his youth career with Algerian club NRB Bethioua, before moving to France and joining Balma, Colomiers and then Ligue 1 club Nice in 2013. He made his professional debut under manager Claude Puel during the 2013–14 season, but played most of his football for the club with the reserve team, for whom he made 37 appearances and scored 11 goals between 2013 and 2016. Benrahma scored one goal in his three first team appearances during the 2014–15 season and scored a further two in 2015–16.

Ankle injuries and the arrival of manager Lucien Favre led to Benrahma spending a large portion of his latter career with the club away on loan, at Ligue 1 club Angers and Ligue 2 clubs Gazélec and Châteauroux. Benrahma departed the Stade de Nice in July 2018, having made 18 appearances and scored three goals during his time with the club.

=== Brentford ===
On 6 July 2018, Benrahma moved to England to join Championship club Brentford on a four-year contract, with the option of a further year, for an undisclosed fee, reported to be £2.7 million. He scored his first goal for the club on his third appearance, in a 4–2 EFL Cup first round victory over Southend United on 14 August 2018. Six weeks later, Benrahma was sent off for the first time in his Bees career after committing two bookable offences during a 2–2 draw with Reading on 29 September. After returning from injury in December, Benrahma broke into the starting lineup and came into form in mid-January 2019, scoring nine goals in 14 league matches. He was nominated for the January and February PFA Fans' Player of the Month awards and one of his three goals in a 5–1 win over Hull City was chosen as the Championship Goal of the Month for February and as Brentford's Goal of the Season. An ankle injury suffered in early April 2019 ended Benrahma's season, by which time he had made 45 appearances and scored 11 goals.

Benrahma missed Brentford's entire 2019–20 pre-season match programme and returned to competitive play in mid-August 2019, before breaking back into the starting lineup late in the month. During a 2019–20 season in which his performances led to him being voted the Brentford Supporters' Player of the Year and named in the Championship PFA Team of the Year, Benrahma made 46 appearances and scored 17 goals, which included two hat-tricks. His performances during Brentford's run to the 2020 Championship play-off final saw him win the January 2020 PFA Fans' Player of the Month and the July 2020 Championship Player of the Month awards. In addition, he was nominated for the 2020 London Football Awards EFL Player of the Year award and the 2019–20 PFA Fans' Championship Player of the Year award.

After a second consecutive pre-season of transfer speculation, Benrahma was left out of head coach Thomas Frank's matchday squads early in the 2020–21 regular season, before making his first appearance of the season as a substitute for Sergi Canós after 73 minutes of a 1–1 draw with Millwall on 26 September 2020. He started the following match versus West London rivals Fulham in the EFL Cup and his performance and second goal in the 3–0 fourth round victory was recognised with the man of the match and Goal of the Round awards respectively.

=== West Ham United ===
On 16 October 2020, Benrahma joined Premier League club West Ham United on an initial season-long loan deal, with an agreement to make the transfer permanent. On 31 October, he came off the bench and made his debut in a 2–1 loss against Liverpool in a league fixture. He was named in the starting 11 for the first time in a 2–1 win over Leeds United on 11 December.

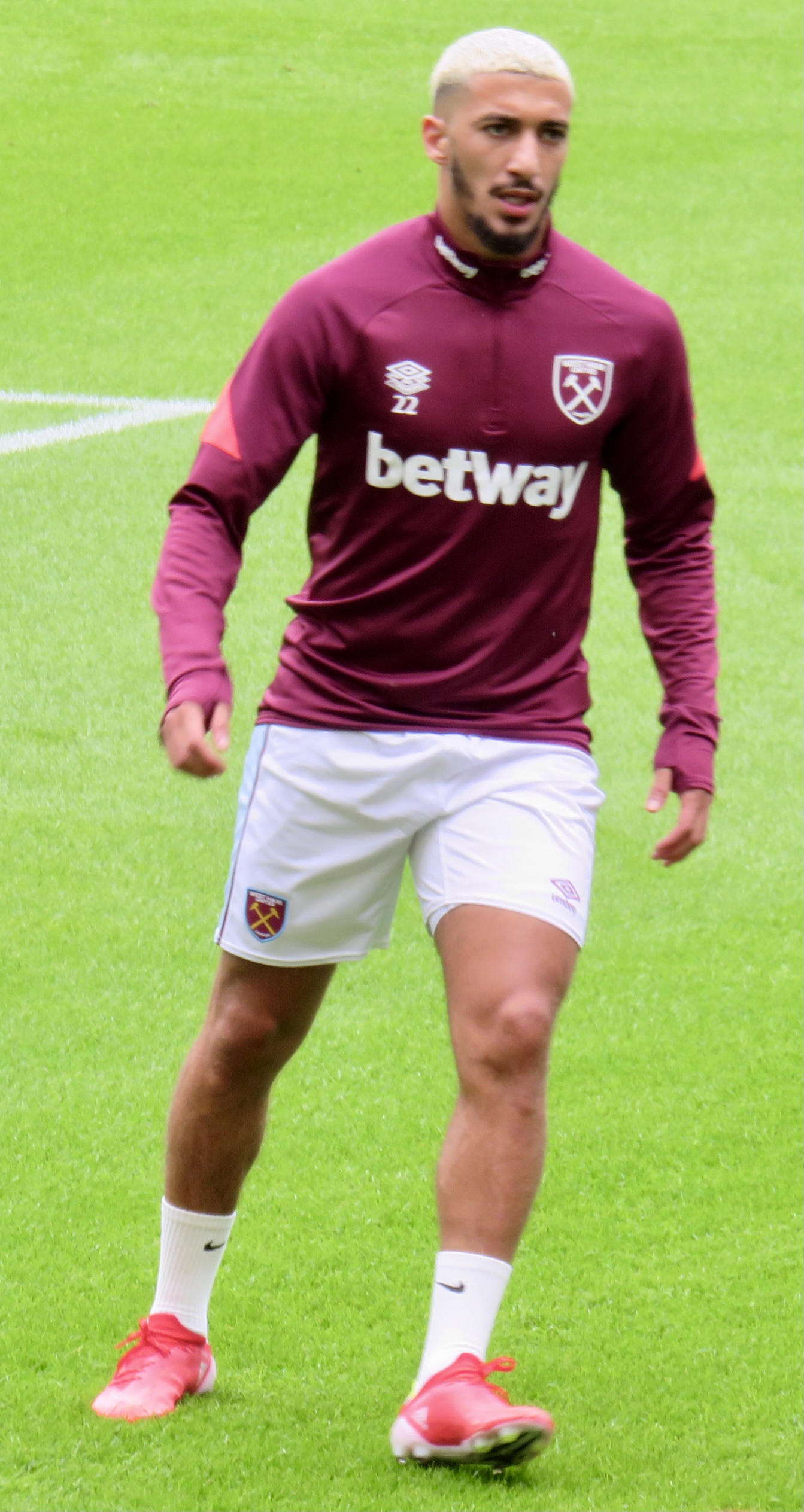
Benrahma in 2021

On 29 January 2021, the loan deal was terminated early as West Ham signed Benrahma on a permanent contract in order to free up a domestic loan space for the incoming Jesse Lingard. The club agreed to pay £25 million plus £5 million in add-ons. The transfer fee made Benrahma West Ham's third most expensive player behind Sébastien Haller and Felipe Anderson. On 15 May 2021, Benrahma scored his first goal for West Ham in a 1–1 away league draw against Brighton & Hove Albion.

On 6 November 2022, he scored a goal in a 2–1 defeat against Crystal Palace which was measured as the most powerful Premier League goal of the season, with an average speed of 107.17 kilometres per hour (66.59 mph). On 7 June 2023, during the 2023 UEFA Europa Conference League final, Benrahma scored West Ham's opening goal, a penalty, in the 62nd minute, against Fiorentina. West Ham won their first trophy in 43 years with a 2–1 victory.

On 1 February 2024, West Ham agreed terms to transfer Benrahma to Ligue 1 club, Lyon. The move initially fell through just before the closing of the transfer window as West Ham failed to transfer the necessary papers to the Premier League leading to Lyon accusing West Ham of "demonstrating a profound lack of respect on the part of West Ham towards the institution and the player." However, after an appeal from Lyon that FIFA accepted, the deal went through and was officially announced the next day.

=== Lyon ===
On 2 February 2024, Benrahma joined Lyon on loan until the end of the season. The club paid £5.1 million for the loan, with a purchase option of €14 million and a 10% interest in the capital gain in the event of a potential future transfer. He completed a permanent transfer to the club, for the €14 million fee, in June 2024.

=== Neom SC ===
On 31 January 2025, Benrahma joined second-tier Saudi First Division side Neom SC on loan until the end of the season. A €12 million purchase option with bonuses up to €3 million would be available should Neom SC gain promotion to the Saudi Pro League. On 22 April 2025, Benrahma joined Neom permanently after their 3‒0 win over Al-Arabi confirmed their promotion to the Saudi Pro League.

== International career ==
In September 2015, Benrahma was called up to the Algeria national team for friendly matches against Guinea and Senegal. He made his debut in the match versus Senegal on 13 October 2015, when he came on as a substitute for Baghdad Bounedjah after 70 minutes of the 1–0 victory. One month later, Benrahma was called into the squad for two 2018 World Cup second round qualifiers versus Tanzania, but did not make an appearance. Benrahma's club form at Brentford during the 2018–19 season was recognised with a call-up for two 2019 Africa Cup of Nations qualifiers. He won his second international cap with a start in a 1–0 win over Tunisia on 26 March 2019. He was named in Algeria's preliminary squad for the 2019 Africa Cup of Nations, but was forced to withdraw due to injury.

Benrahma scored his first international goal in a 4–0 away win against Djibouti on 12 November 2021 in the 2022 FIFA World Cup qualifiers. He was named in Algeria's squad for the 2021 Africa Cup of Nations.

== Personal life ==
Benrahma was born in Aïn Témouchent and grew up in Sidi Bel Abbès. He moved to Toulouse, France with his parents at the age of 11 and holds French nationality. Benrahma's father died in January 2020 and he publicly dedicated each of his subsequent five goals to him.

In October 2025, Benrahma was fined £12,000 after he pleaded guilty to two counts of owning dangerously out of control dogs. The XL Bullies had injured a man and attacked his Golden Retriever after escaping from Benrahma's home in Hornchurch, East London.

== Career statistics ==
=== Club ===
As of match played 20 October 2026

Appearances and goals by club, season and competition
Club	Season	League			National cup (Note: Includes Coupe de France, FA Cup, King's Cup)		League cup (Note: Includes Coupe de la Ligue, EFL Cup)		Continental		Other		Total	
Club	Season	Division	Apps	Goals	Apps	Goals	Apps	Goals	Apps	Goals	Apps	Goals	Apps	Goals
Nice II	2013–14	CFA Group C	12	3	—		—		—		—		12	3
Nice II	2014–15	CFA Group C	13	5	—		—		—		—		13	5
Nice II	2015–16	CFA Group C	2	0	—		—		—		—		2	0
Nice II	2016–17	CFA Group D	10	3	—		—		—		—		10	3
Nice II	Total		37	11	—		—		—		—		37	11
Nice	2013–14	Ligue 1	5	0	0	0	0	0	0	0	—		5	0
Nice	2014–15	Ligue 1	3	1	0	0	0	0	—		—		3	1
Nice	2015–16	Ligue 1	9	2	—		1	0	—		—		10	2
Nice	Total		17	3	0	0	1	0	0	0	—		18	3
Angers (loan)	2015–16	Ligue 1	12	1	1	0	—		—		—		13	1
Angers II (loan)	2015–16	CFA Group B	3	1	—		—		—		—		3	1
Gazélec (loan)	2016–17	Ligue 2	15	3	0	0	—		—		—		15	3
Châteauroux (loan)	2017–18	Ligue 2	31	9	3	3	—		—		—		34	12
Brentford	2018–19	Championship	38	10	4	0	3	1	—		—		45	11
Brentford	2019–20	Championship	43	17	0	0	0	0	—		3 (Note: Appearances in Championship play-offs)	0	46	17
Brentford	2020–21	Championship	2	0	—		1	2	—		—		3	2
Brentford	Total		83	27	4	0	4	3	—		3	0	94	30
West Ham United (loan)	2020–21 (Note: Part of this season was spent on loan from Brentford)	Premier League	30	1	3	0	—		—		—		33	1
West Ham United	2021–22	Premier League	32	8	2	0	2	0	12 (Note: Appearances in UEFA Europa League)	3	—		48	11
West Ham United	2022–23	Premier League	35	6	3	2	1	0	13 (Note: Appearances in UEFA Europa Conference League)	4	—		52	12
West Ham United	2023–24	Premier League	13	0	1	0	3	0	5 (Note: Appearances in UEFA Europa League)	0	—		22	0
West Ham United	West Ham total		110	15	9	2	6	0	30	7	—		155	24
Lyon (loan)	2023–24	Ligue 1	12	3	3	0	—		—		—		15	3
Lyon	2024–25	Ligue 1	13	1	2	1	—		7	1	—		22	3
Lyon	Lyon total		25	4	5	1	—		7	1	—		37	6
Neom (loan)	2024–25	Saudi First Division League	16	7	—		—		—		—		16	7
Neom	2025–26	Saudi Pro League	27	10	1	0	—		—		—		28	10
Neom	2026–27	Saudi Pro League	5	2	1	1	—		—		1 (Note: Appearance in GFF Gulf Club Champions League)	1	7	4
Neom	Neom total		48	19	2	1	—		—		1	1	51	21
Career total			381	93	24	7	11	3	37	8	4	1	456	112

=== International ===
As of match played 8 September 2025

Appearances and goals by national team and year
National team	Year	Apps	Goals
Algeria	2015	1	0
Algeria	2019	2	0
Algeria	2020	3	0
Algeria	2021	8	1
Algeria	2022	5	0
Algeria	2023	6	0
Algeria	2024	9	3
Algeria	2025	6	0
Total		40	4

Scores and results list Algeria's goal tally first, score column indicates score after each Benrahma goal.

List of international goals scored by Saïd Benrahma
No.	Date	Venue	Opponent	Score	Result	Competition
1	12 November 2021	Cairo International Stadium, Cairo, Egypt	Djibouti	2–0	4–0	2022 FIFA World Cup qualification
2	10 June 2024	Mandela National Stadium, Kampala, Uganda	Uganda	2–1	2–1	2026 FIFA World Cup qualification
3	10 October 2024	19 May 1956 Stadium, Annaba, Algeria	Togo	1–1	5–1	2025 Africa Cup of Nations qualification
4	10 October 2024	19 May 1956 Stadium, Annaba, Algeria	Togo	2–1	5–1	2025 Africa Cup of Nations qualification

== Honours ==
West Ham United

- UEFA Europa Conference League: 2022–23

Lyon

- Coupe de France runner-up: 2023–24

Neom

- Saudi First Division League: 2024–25

Individual

- PFA Fans' Player of the Month: January 2020
- EFL Championship Player of the Month: July 2020
- Brentford Supporters' Player of the Year: 2019–20
- Championship PFA Team of the Year: 2019–20
- Premier League Most Powerful Goal: 2022–23

=== Record ===
- Neom sc's top scorer with 17 goals
