= 2022–23 Linfield F.C. season =

Linfield
2022–23 season
- Chairman: Roy McGivern
- Manager: David Healy
- Stadium: Windsor Park
- NIFL Premiership: Second place
- County Antrim Shield: Runners-up
- NIFL League Cup: Winners
- Scottish Challenge Cup: Fourth round
- Irish Cup: Sixth round
- Champions League: Second qualifying round
- Europa League: Third qualifying round
- Conference League: Play-off round
- Top goalscorer: League: Eetu Vertainen (17); All: Eetu Vertainen (17)
Home colours	Away colours

The 2022–23 season is Linfield's 122nd season in the top flight of the Northern Ireland Football League having never been relegated since the league's formation in 1890. In addition to the domestic league, they will also compete in the Irish Cup, the League Cup, the County Antrim Shield, the Scottish Challenge Cup, the UEFA Champions League, UEFA Europa League and UEFA Europa Conference League.

== Results and fixtures ==
=== Pre-season ===
Linfield announced the first of their friendlies on 19 May stating they would be playing Newtown and St Mirren at home in preparation for their Champions League 1st Qualifying Round tie. A further 2 fixtures against Knockbreda and Harland & Wolff Welders, both to be held away from home were announced on 9 June. While on a pre-season training camp in Marbella, Linfield announced they would be playing Qatar at the end of the camp. The final pre-season friendly was announced as being against Loughgall as a testimonial match for Loughgall Player Steven Ferguson.

21 June 2022	Linfield	1–0	Qatar	Marbella
18:00 BST	McKee 19'	Report		Stadium: Marbella Football Center; Referee: Alvarez Dorado

25 June 2022	Linfield	0–0	(Wales) Newtown	Belfast
14:30 BST		Report		Stadium: Windsor Park; Referee: Ben McMaster

2 July 2022	Linfield	1–2	(Scotland) St Mirren	Belfast
13:30 BST	Finlayson 18'	Report	Greive 2'; Ayunga 37'	Stadium: Windsor Park; Referee: Steven Gregg

9 July 2022	Knockbreda	1–2	Linfield	Belfast
14:00 BST	Munn 82'	Report	Stewart 8'; Vertainen 17'	Stadium: Breda Park; Referee: Ross Dunlop

16 July 2022	H & W Welders	1–8	Linfield	Belfast
19:45 BST	47'	Report	Vertainen 6'; Archer 8'; A Clarke 23', 35'; Stewart 28', 54'; McKee 44'; McClean 72'	Stadium: Blanchflower Park; Referee: Ben McMaster

23 July 2022	Loughgall	0–2	Linfield	Loughgall
14:00 BST		Report	Vertainen 31'; McKee 71'	Stadium: Lakeview Park; Referee: Jack Irwin
Note: Steven Ferguson Testimonial

=== NIFL Charity Shield ===
6 August 2022	Linfield	0–2	Crusaders	Belfast
15:00 BST		Report	Heatley 68'; McKeown 72'	Stadium: Windsor Park

=== NIFL Premiership ===
14 August 2022 1	Linfield	4–0	Portadown	Belfast
15:00 BST	Millar 6'; Devine 57'; Vertainen 72'; Clarke 86'	Report		Stadium: Windsor Park; Attendance: 2,806; Referee: Timothy Marshall

21 August 2022 2	Newry City	1–3	Linfield	Newry
14:00 BST	Forde 35'	Report	Vertainen 16', 28'; Clarke 78'	Stadium: The Showgrounds; Attendance: 2,029; Referee: Iain McNabb

28 August 2022 3	Carrick Rangers	2–1	Linfield	Carrickfergus
14:00 BST	Mitchell 14'; McGuckin 64'	Report	Devine 53'	Stadium: Taylors Avenue; Attendance: 1,452; Referee: Tony Clarke

3 September 2022 4	Ballymena United	0–4	Linfield	Ballymena
15:00 BST		Report	Cooper 38'; Millar 45'; Shields 59 pen.'; McDaid 62'	Stadium: Ballymena Showgrounds; Attendance: 1,742; Referee: Jamie Robinson

16 September 2022 5	Crusaders	2–1	Linfield	Belfast
19:45 BST	Lowry 59'; Forsythe 82'	Report	Cooper 47'	Stadium: Seaview; Attendance: 2,367; Referee: Lee Tavinder

1 October 2022 6	Dungannon Swifts	0–1	Linfield	Dungannon
15:00 BST		Report	McDaid 36'	Stadium: Stangmore Park; Attendance: 1,225; Referee: Tony Clarke

8 October 2022 7	Coleraine	0–0	Linfield	Coleraine
15:00 BST		Report		Stadium: The Showgrounds; Attendance: 3,876; Referee: Raymond Crangle

14 October 2022 8	Linfield	0–3	Glentoran	Belfast
19:45 BST	Newberry (red card) 30'	Report	Burns 48'; Purkis 76', 90+1'	Stadium: Windsor Park; Attendance: 7,134; Referee: Lee Tavinder

18 October 2022 9	Linfield	3–2	Glenavon	Belfast
19:45 BST	Millar 17'; Cooper 75'; Vertainen 87'	Report	Fitzpatrick 41', 67'	Stadium: Windsor Park; Attendance: 1,620; Referee: Declan Hassan

22 October 2022 10	Linfield	2–4	Larne	Belfast
15:00 BST	Palmer 42'; Devine 85'	Report	Doherty 4 pen.'; O’Neill 7'; Bonis 60'; Millar 70'	Stadium: Windsor Park; Attendance: 2,734; Referee: Ian McNabb

29 October 2022 11	Newry City	0–2	Linfield	Newry
15:00 BST		Report	McDaid 15'; Cooper 58'	Stadium: The Showgrounds; Attendance: 738; Referee: Raymond Crangle

5 November 2022 12	Portadown	0–3	Linfield	Portadown
15:00 BST		Report	Roscoe 67'; McDaid 89'; Cooper 90+3'	Stadium: Shamrock Park; Attendance: 1,550; Referee: Gavin Andrews

8 November 2022 13	Linfield	0–0	Cliftonville	Belfast
19:45 BST		Report		Stadium: Windsor Park; Attendance: 3,771; Referee: Raymond Crangle

12 November 2022 14	Linfield	2–1	Glenavon	Belfast
15:00 BST	Finlayson 68'; McDaid 85'	Report	Glynn 58'	Stadium: Windsor Park; Attendance: 2,547; Referee: Timothy Marshall

18 November 2022 15	Ballymena United	0–2	Linfield	Ballymena
19:45 BST		Report	McKee 28'; Callacher 51'	Stadium: Ballymena Showgrounds; Attendance: 1,714; Referee: Jamie Robinson

22 November 2022 16	Linfield	1–0	Larne	Belfast
19:45 BST	Newberry 77'	Report		Stadium: Windsor Park; Attendance: 2,344; Referee: Ross Dunlop

26 November 2022 17	Linfield	0–0	Crusaders	Belfast
17:30 BST		Report		Stadium: Windsor Park; Attendance: 2,264; Referee: Ian McNabb

3 December 2022 18	Linfield	3–1	Carrick Rangers	Belfast
15:00 BST	Vertainen 2', 28'; McDaid 90+2'	Report	Tilney 80'	Stadium: Windsor Park; Attendance: 1,549; Referee: Tony Clarke

17 December 2022 19	Linfield	4–0	Dungannon Swifts	Belfast
15:00 BST	McKee 6'; Vertainen 33'; Palmer 49'; McStravick 90+2'	Report		Stadium: Windsor Park; Attendance: 1,521; Referee: Gavin Andrews

26 December 2022 20	Glentoran	1–2	Linfield	Belfast
14:00 BST	Donnelly 54'	Report	Shields 40 pen.'; Vertainen 90'	Stadium: The Oval; Attendance: 6,154; Referee: Raymond Crangle

2 January 2023 21	Linfield	0–0	Coleraine	Belfast
15:00 BST		Report		Stadium: Windsor Park; Attendance: 3,553; Referee: Ian McNabb

10 January 2023 22	Cliftonville	1–0	Linfield	Belfast
19:45 BST	Doherty 12'	Report		Stadium: Solitude; Attendance: 2,336; Referee: Timothy Marshall

14 January 2023 23	Glenavon	1–6	Linfield	Lurgan
15:00 BST	McCloskey 19'	Report	Clarke 6'; Roscoe 52'; Vertainen 57'; Shields 64 pen.', 79 pen.'; Haygarth 82'	Stadium: Mourneview Park; Attendance: 1,655; Referee: Tony Clarke

21 January 2023 24	Linfield	3–0	Ballymena United	Belfast
15:00 BST	Vertainen 16', 36', 46'	Report		Stadium: Windsor Park; Attendance: 2,376; Referee: Ross Dunlop

24 January 2023 25	Crusaders	2–0	Linfield	Belfast
19:45 BST	Forsythe 6'; Lowry 59'	Report	Haygarth 82'	Stadium: Seaview; Attendance: 2,754; Referee: Lee Tavinder

28 January 2023 26	Portadown	1–6	Linfield	Portadown
15:00 BST	McNally 44'	Report	Cooper 10', 86'; Vertainen 22', 58', 75'; McKee 88'	Stadium: Shamrock Park; Attendance: 1,364; Referee: Evan Boyce

11 February 2023 27	Linfield	1–0	Cliftonville	Belfast
15:00 BST	Lowe 59 o.g.'	Report		Stadium: Windsor Park; Attendance: 4,816; Referee: Ian McNabb

14 February 2022 28	Glentoran	3–0	Linfield	Belfast
19:45 BST	Burns 34', 61'; Wilson 48'	Report		Stadium: The Oval; Attendance: 5,437; Referee: Jamie Robinson

18 February 2023 29	Linfield	2–0	Carrick Rangers	Belfast
15:00 BST	Vertainen 55'; McClean 76'	Report		Stadium: Windsor Park; Attendance: 1,866; Referee: Andrew Davey

25 February 2023 30	Linfield	2–0	Coleraine	Belfast
15:00 BST	Shields 14 pen.'; Vertainen 50'	Report		Stadium: Windsor Park; Attendance: 2,689; Referee: Gavin Andrews

7 March 2022 31	Larne	0–0	Linfield	Larne
19:45 BST		Report		Stadium: Inver Park; Attendance: 2,712; Referee: Timothy Marshall

18 March 2023 32	Linfield	7–0	Newry City	Belfast
15:00 BST	Cooper 4', 43', 45+1', 64'; Clarke 25'; McKee 55', 57'	Report		Stadium: Windsor Park; Attendance: 1,549; Referee: Evan Boyce

24 March 2023 33	Dungannon Swifts	0–5	Linfield	Dungannon
19:45 BST		Report	McKee 17'; Cooper 47'; Devine 31', 48'; Millar 51'	Stadium: Stangmore Park

7 April 2023 34	Linfield	0–0	Crusaders	Belfast
19:45 BST		Report		Stadium: Windsor Park; Attendance: 3,514; Referee: Shane Andrews

12 April 2023 35	Linfield	1–1	Glentoran	Belfast
19:45 BST	Roscoe 40'	Report	Burns 90'	Stadium: Windsor Park; Attendance: 4,671; Referee: Tony Clarke

15 April 2023 36	Coleraine	0–1	Linfield	Coleraine
15:00 BST		Report	Quinn 87'	Stadium: The Showgrounds; Attendance: 3,752; Referee: Lee Tavinder

21 April 2023 37	Larne	1–1	Linfield	Larne
19:45 BST	Ryan 39'	Report	Fallon 57'	Stadium: Inver Park; Referee: Shane Andrews

29 April 2023 38	Cliftonville	0–2	Linfield	Belfast
17:30 BST	Hale (red card) 89'	Report	Callacher 10'; Shields 56 pen.'	Stadium: Solitude; Referee: Jamie Robinson

=== County Antrim Shield ===
6 September 2022 First round	Crusaders	0–1	Linfield	Belfast
19:45 BST	Murphy (red card) 50'	Report	Fallon 68'	Stadium: Seaview; Referee: Andrew Davey

11 October 2022 Quarter-final	Cliftonville	1–1 (4–5 p)	Linfield	Belfast
19:45 BST	Gormley 27'	Report	Clarke 2'	Stadium: Solitude; Referee: Jamie Robinson

15 November 2022 Semi-final	Linfield	2–1	Glentoran	Belfast
19:45 BST	Clarke 27'; Shields 67 pen.'	Report	Singleton 64'	Stadium: Windsor Park; Referee: Christopher Morrison

17 January 2023 Final	Linfield	0–0 (3–4 p)	Larne	Belfast
19:45 BST	McClean (red card) 30'	Report		Stadium: Seaview; Referee: Shane Andrews

=== NIFL Cup ===
13 September 2022 First round	Moyola Park	1–5	Linfield	Castledawson
19:45 BST	McNeil 31'	Report	Quinn 30'; Millar 41'; Clarke 46'; Vertainen 79'; McDaid 84'	Stadium: Mill Meadow; Referee: Declan Hassan

4 October 2022 Second round	Dundela	0–1	Linfield	Belfast
19:45 BST		Report	McDaid 75'	Stadium: Wilgar Park; Referee: Christopher Morrison

1 November 2022 Quarter-final	Linfield	3–0	Annagh United	Belfast
19:45 BST	Cooper 24', 81'; McStravick 90+3'	Report		Stadium: Windsor Park; Referee: Steven Gregg

6 December 2022 Semi-final	Glentoran	0–3	Linfield	Belfast
19:45 BST		Report	Roscoe 19'; Vertainen 30'; Palmer 73'	Stadium: The Oval; Referee: Tim Marshall

12 March 2023 Final	Linfield	2–0	Coleraine	Belfast
15:00 BST	Cooper 49'; Shields 59'	Report		Stadium: Windsor Park; Attendance: 11,038; Referee: Lee Tavinder

=== Scottish Challenge Cup ===
24 September 2022 Third round	(Scotland) Buckie Thistle	1–2	(Northern Ireland) Linfield	Buckie
15:00 BST	Goodall 53'	Report	Cooper 74'; Quinn 75'	Stadium: Victoria Park; Attendance: 561; Referee: Chris Fordyce

10 December 2022 Fourth round	(Scotland) Kelty Hearts	1–1 (5–4 p)	(Northern Ireland) Linfield	Kelty
15:00 BST	Higginbotham 83'	Report	McKee 44'	Stadium: New Central Park; Attendance: 1,340; Referee: Craig Napier

=== Irish Cup ===
7 January 2023 Fifth round	Linfield	3–0	Warrenpoint Town	Belfast
15:00 BST	McDaid 23'; McKee 48'; Clarke 83'	Report		Stadium: Windsor Park; Referee: Ben McMaster

4 February 2023 Sixth round	Larne	1–1 (4–3 p)	Linfield	Larne
15:00 BST	Bonis 57'	Report	McClean 44'	Stadium: Inver Park; Referee: Tony Clarke

=== UEFA Champions League ===
==== First qualifying round ====
5 July 2022 1st Leg	(Wales) The New Saints	1–0	(Northern Ireland) Linfield	Oswestry
19:00 BST	Brobbel 57'; Marriott (yellow card) 25'; Williams (yellow card) 69'	Report	Finlayson (yellow card) 32'; Clarke (yellow card) 53'; Shields (yellow card) 90+2'	Stadium: Park Hall; Attendance: 1,034; Referee: A Chivulete (ROU)

13 July 2022 2nd Leg	(Northern Ireland) Linfield	2–0 (2–1 agg.)	(Wales) The New Saints	Belfast
19:45 BST	Mulgrew 90+4'; Devine 95'; Fallon (yellow card) 48'; Cooper (yellow card) 55'; Roscoe (yellow card) 72'; Stewart (yellow card) 85'; Clarke (yellow card) 98'; Shields (yellow card) 119'	Report	Roberts (yellow card) 33'; Davies (yellow card) 82'; Smith (yellow card) 103'	Stadium: Windsor Park; Attendance: 2,971; Referee: D Strukan (CRO)

==== Second qualifying round ====
19 July 2022 1st Leg	(Northern Ireland) Linfield	1–0	(Norway) Bodø/Glimt	Belfast
19:45 BST	Millar 83'; Hall (yellow card) 22'	Report	Hoibraaten (yellow card) 16'; Wembangomo (yellow card) 72'; Hagen (yellow card) 78'	Stadium: Windsor Park; Attendance: 3,168; Referee: A Treimanis

27 July 2022 2nd Leg	(Norway) Bodø/Glimt	8–0 (8–1 agg.)	(Northern Ireland) Linfield	Bodø
18:00 BST	Vetlesen 7'; Boniface 21' (pen.); Pellegrino 25', 54' (pen.); Saltnes 29'; Espejord 52', 88'; Sampsted 73'	Report		Stadium: Aspmyra Stadion; Attendance: 5,110; Referee: R Reinshreiber

=== UEFA Europa League ===
==== Third qualifying round ====
4 August 2022 1st Leg	(Northern Ireland) Linfield	0–2	(Switzerland) Zürich	Belfast
20:45 BST		Report	Aiyegun 48'; Gnonto 64'	Stadium: Windsor Park; Attendance: 3,044; Referee: M Di Bello

11 August 2022 2nd Leg	(Switzerland) Zürich	3–0 (5–0 agg.)	(Northern Ireland) Linfield	Zürich
19:00 BST	Avdijaj 11', 26'; Santini 84'	Report		Stadium: Letzigrund; Attendance: 7,904; Referee: H Osmers

=== UEFA Conference League ===
==== Play-off round ====
18 August 2022 1st Leg	(Latvia) RFS	2–2	(Northern Ireland) Linfield	Riga
19:00 EEST	Friesenbichler 88'; Lipušček 90+5'	Report	Fallon 38'; Cooper 71'	Stadium: Daugava Stadium; Attendance: 4,710; Referee: A Aghayev

25 August 2022 2nd Leg	(Northern Ireland) Linfield	1–1 (a.e.t.) (3–3 agg.) (2–4 p)	(Latvia) RFS	Belfast
19:45 BST	McClean 104'	Report	Callacher 120+1 o.g.'	Stadium: Windsor Park; Attendance: 4,742; Referee: M Jug
	Penalties
	M. Clarke (penalty missed); Devine (penalty missed); Vertainen (penalty scored); McClean (penalty scored)		(penalty scored) Friesenbichler; (penalty scored) Ilić; (penalty scored) Mareš; (penalty scored) Panić

== Club statistics ==
=== Competition overview ===
Competition	First Match	Last Match	Starting Round	Final Position	Record							
Competition	First Match	Last Match	Starting Round	Final Position	Pld	W	D	L	GF	GA	GD	Win %
Champions League	5 July 2022	27 July 2022	First qualifying round	Second qualifying round	4	2	0	2	3	9	-6	50.0%
Europa League	4 August 2022	11 August 2022	Third qualifying round	Third qualifying round	2	0	0	2	0	5	-5	0%
NIFL Charity Shield	6 August 2022	6 August 2022	Final	Runners-up	1	0	0	1	0	2	-2	0%
NIFL Premiership	14 August 2022	29 April 2023	Matchday 1	Second place	38	23	8	7	75	27	48	60.5%
Conference League	18 August 2022	25 August 2022	Play-off round	Play-Off round	2	0	2	0	3	3	0	0%
County Antrim Shield	6 September 2022	17 January 2023	First round	Runners-up	5	3	2	0	4	2	2	100.0%
NIFL League Cup	13 September 2022	12 March 2023	First round	Winners	5	5	0	0	14	1	13	100.0%
Scottish Challenge Cup	24 September 2022	10 December 2022	Third round	Fourth round	2	1	1	0	3	2	1	50.0%
Irish Cup	7 January 2023	4 February 2023	Fifth round	Sixth round	2	1	1	0	4	1	3	50.0%
Total					65	35	13	12	106	52	54	62.2%

=== League table ===
Pos	Team	Pld	W	D	L	GF	GA	GD	Pts	Qualification or relegation (Note: Teams play each other three times (33 matches), before the league is split into two groups (the top six and the bottom six).)
1	Larne (C)	38	25	8	5	64	22	+42	83	Qualification for the Champions League first qualifying round
2	Linfield	38	23	8	7	75	27	+48	77	Qualification for the Europa Conference League first qualifying round
3	Glentoran (O)	38	23	5	10	77	28	+49	74	Qualification for the Europa Conference League play-offs (Note: Glentoran entered the Europa Conference League first qualifying round as play-off winners.)
4	Cliftonville	38	20	8	10	66	53	+13	68	Qualification for the Europa Conference League play-offs
5	Crusaders	38	19	10	9	72	45	+27	67	Qualification for the Europa Conference League first qualifying round (Note: Crusaders entered the Europa Conference League first qualifying round as 2022–23 Irish Cup winners.)

Source: Northern Ireland Football League, Soccerway
Rules for classification: 1) Points; 2) Goal difference; 3) Number of goals scored; 4) Head-to-head points; 5) Head-to-head goal difference; 6) Drawing of lots
(C) Champions; (O) Play-off winners

== Transfers ==
=== Players in ===
Player	From	Fee
(Northern Ireland) Joel Cooper	(England) Oxford United	Free
(Northern Ireland) Chris McKee	(Scotland) Rangers	Free
(Northern Ireland) Robbie McDaid	(Northern Ireland) Glentoran	Free
(England) Max Haygarth	Free agent	Free
(Northern Ireland) Kyle Lafferty	(Scotland) Kilmarnock	Free

=== Players out ===
Player	To	Fee
(Northern Ireland) Alex Moore	(Northern Ireland) Ards	Free
(England) Mich'el Parker	Free agent	Free
(Northern Ireland) Martin Donnelly	Free agent	Free
(Democratic Republic of the Congo) Christy Manzinga	(Hungary) Zalaegerszegi	Free
(Northern Ireland) Adam Carroll	(Northern Ireland) Warrenpoint Town	Free
(Northern Ireland) Jake Corbett	(Northern Ireland) Ballymena United	Free
(Northern Ireland) Jack Sharvin	Free agent	Free
(Northern Ireland) Ewan McCoubrey	(Northern Ireland) Knockbreda	Undisclosed
(Northern Ireland) Jack Montgomery	(Northern Ireland) Knockbreda	Undisclosed

=== Loans in ===
Player	From	Fee

=== Loans out ===
Player	To	Fee
(Northern Ireland) Jordan Stewart	(Northern Ireland) Glenavon	Free
