= 2019–20 St Johnstone F.C. season =

St Johnstone
2019–20 season
- Chairman: Steve Brown
- Manager: Tommy Wright
- Stadium: McDiarmid Park; Perth, Scotland (Capacity: 10,696)
- Scottish Premiership: 6th
- Scottish Cup: Quarter-finals
- Scottish League Cup: Group stage
- Top goalscorer: League: Callum Hendry (7); All: Callum Hendry (9)
- Highest home attendance: 8,743 vs Celtic
- Lowest home attendance: 1,497 vs Brechin City
- Average home league attendance: 4,091
Home colours	Away colours

The 2019–20 season was the club's seventh season in the Scottish Premiership and their tenth consecutive season in the top flight of Scottish football. St Johnstone also competed in the Scottish Cup and the League Cup.

On 13 March, the Scottish football season was suspended with immediate effect due to the COVID-19 pandemic.
On 18 May, the SPFL declared the end of the season determining on an average points per game with the Saints finishing in sixth place, jumping Hibernian in the final standings.

== Season summary ==
Tommy Wright remained as manager for the start of his seventh season in charge. St Johnstone were knocked out of League Cup at the Group Stage after losing three of the four matches played. The Saints were then thrashed 7–0 by Celtic on the opening day of the season. It didn't get much better for the Saints as they slumped to the bottom of the table before the September International break and remained there and were still win-less until mid-October. They won both their matches against Hamilton and Hearts to end their win-less run and lift them off the bottom. They went through December with four clean sheets, lifting the club up to ninth in the table. In March, they were knocked out of the Scottish Cup by Celtic, narrowly losing at home. They were seven matches unbeaten and up to seventh in the League but the season was halted due to the COVID-19 pandemic. On 9 April, the Scottish football season was further suspended until at least 10 June. On 2 May, manager Tommy Wright left the club.

== Results & fixtures ==
Win Draw Loss Postponed

=== Pre-season ===
3 July 2019 Friendly	Glentoran	1–1	St Johnstone	The Oval, Belfast, Northern Ireland
19:30 BST	Allen 34'	Report	Trialist 20'

6 July 2019 Friendly	Linfield	2–4	St Johnstone	Windsor Park, Belfast, Northern Ireland
14:00 BST	Lavery 3'; Forde 83'	Report	Swanson 20'; Hendry 70'; McCann 80'; Kerr 86'	Referee: Ian McNabb

9 July 2019 Friendly	Greenock Morton	2–3	St Johnstone	Cappielow
19:45 BST	Nesbitt 56'; Sutton 59'	Report	O'Halloran 15'; Tanser 26' (pen.); Wotherspoon 49'	Attendance: 635; Referee: Steven Reid

12 July 2019 Friendly	Inverness Caledonian Thistle	3–1	St Johnstone	Grant Street Park
19:45 BST	Keatings 35'; Todorov 67'; Machado 85'	Report	Tanser 51' (pen.)

=== Scottish Premiership ===
3 August 2019 1	Celtic	7–0	St Johnstone	Celtic Park
15:00	Johnston 9'; Christie 26', 30', 67'; Ntcham 72'; Édouard 80'; Griffiths 86'	BBC Report		Attendance: 58,877; Referee: Kevin Clancy

10 August 2019 2	St Johnstone	2–2	Livingston	McDiarmid Park
14:00	Kennedy 55'; Hendry 82'	BBC Report	Lawless 13'; Pittman 39'	Attendance: 2,349; Referee: Andrew Dallas

24 August 2019 3	Hibernian	2–2	St Johnstone	Easter Road
15:00	Jackson 25'; Kamberi 69'	BBC Report	O'Halloran 68'; Kerr 90+4'	Attendance: 15,315; Referee: Don Robertson

31 August 2019 4	St Johnstone	0–1	Kilmarnock	McDiarmid Park
15:00		BBC Report	O'Donnell 40'	Attendance: 3,427; Referee: David Munro

14 September 2019 5	Aberdeen	1–1	St Johnstone	Pittodrie Stadium
15:00	Hedges 28'	Report	O'Halloran 43'	Attendance: 13,272; Referee: Steven McLean

22 September 2019 6	St Johnstone	0–4	Rangers	McDiarmid Park
12:15		Report	Morelos 47'; Goldson 61'; Defoe 88', 90'	Attendance: 6,251; Referee: Andrew Dallas
Note: Game televised on BT Sport

28 September 2019 7	St Johnstone	0–1	Motherwell	McDiarmid Park
15:00		Report	Cole 42'	Attendance: 2,972; Referee: Gavin Duncan

5 October 2019 8	Ross County	2–2	St Johnstone	Global Energy Stadium
15:00	Chalmers 10'; Spittal 68'	Report	May 24'; Kennedy 51'	Attendance: 4,124; Referee: Euan Anderson

19 October 2019 9	St Mirren	2–0	St Johnstone	St Mirren Park
15:00	Obika 37'; Mullen 61'	Report		Attendance: 4,791; Referee: Nick Walsh

26 October 2019 10	St Johnstone	3–2	Hamilton Academical	McDiarmid Park
15:00	Wotherspoon 36', 60'; Hendry 88'	Report	Miller 25'; Davies 83' (pen.)	Attendance: 2,231; Referee: Alan Muir

30 October 2019 11	St Johnstone	1–0	Hearts	McDiarmid Park
19:45	Berra 58' (Own goal)	Report		Attendance: 3,104; Referee: David Munro

2 November 2019 12 (Note: Match postponed due to Rangers involvement in League Cup. Was not re-scheduled)	Rangers	P–P	St Johnstone	Ibrox Stadium

9 November 2019 13	St Johnstone	1–4	Hibernian	McDiarmid Park
15:00	Hendry (yellow card) 51'; May 90'	Report	Doidge 2', 17', 58'; Allan 48'	Attendance: 3,931; Referee: Andrew Dallas

24 November 2019 14	St Johnstone	1–1	Aberdeen	McDiarmid Park
15:00	Holt (yellow card) 43'; Duffy (yellow card) 45'; Kennedy 71'; Davidson (red card) 74'; Hendry (red card) 78'; Wotherspoon (yellow card) 90'	Report	Cosgrove 21'; Logan (yellow card) 39'; Bryson (yellow card) 76'	Attendance: 3,917; Referee: Kevin Clancy

30 November 2019 15	Motherwell	4–0	St Johnstone	Fir Park
15:00	Cole 29'; Hartley 49'; Carroll 72'; Manzinga 89'	Report	McCann (yellow card) 70'	Attendance: 4,092; Referee: Euan Anderson

4 December 2019 16	Kilmarnock	0–0	St Johnstone	Rugby Park
15:00		Report		Attendance: 4,083; Referee: Bobby Madden

8 December 2019 17 (Note: Match postponed due to Celtic involvement in League Cup. Re-scheduled for 29 Jan 2020)	St Johnstone	P–P	Celtic	McDiarmid Park
		Report

14 December 2019 18	Heart of Midlothian	0–1	St Johnstone	Tynecastle Park
15:00		Report	Hendry 74'	Attendance: 16,347; Referee: Alan Newlands

21 December 2019 19	St Johnstone	0–0	St Mirren	McDiarmid Park
15:00		Report		Attendance: 3,318; Referee: John Beaton

26 December 2019 20	Hamilton Academical	0−1	St Johnstone	Fountain of Youth Stadium
15:00	Easton (yellow card) 83'	Report	Davidson (yellow card) 59'; McCann 80'; Hendry (yellow card) 81'	Attendance: 1,536; Referee: Gavin Duncan

29 December 2019 21	St Johnstone	1−1	Ross County	McDiarmid Park
15:00	Hendry 84'	Report	Vigurs 72'; Graham (yellow card) 68' (yellow-red card) 90+3'	Attendance: 2,658; Referee: Bobby Madden

22 January 2020 22	Livingston	1−0	St. Johnstone	Almondvale Stadium
19:45	McMillan (yellow card) 40'; Bartley (yellow card) 44'; Pittman 56'	Report	Kane (yellow card) 80'	Attendance: 1,140; Referee: Euan Anderson

25 January 2020 23	St Johnstone	2–1	Kilmarnock	McDiarmid Park
15:00	McCann 7'; Wotherspoon (yellow card) 24', (goal) 83'; Hendry (yellow card) 89'	Report	Burke 22' (pen.); Del Fabro (yellow card) 79'; Findlay (yellow card) 89'; Kiltie (yellow card) 90+2'	Attendance: 2,609; Referee: Alan Muir

29 January 2020 17 (Note: Re-scheduled match after initial postponement)	St Johnstone	0–3	Celtic	McDiarmid Park
19:45		Report	Ntcham 6'; Forrest 20'; Griffiths 26'	Attendance: 8,743; Referee: John Beaton

1 February 2020 24	St Johnstone	3–3	Heart of Midlothian	McDiarmid Park
15:00	May 17', 62' (Penalty); McCann 52'	BBC Report	Boyce 26'; Naismith 31'; Clare 90+1'	Attendance: 6,002; Referee: Aitken

5 February 2020 25	Aberdeen	0–1	St Johnstone	Pittodrie Stadium
19:45		Report	McCann 6'	Attendance: 12,552; Referee: Kevin Clancy

12 February 2020 26	St Johnstone	2–1	Motherwell	McDiarmid Park
19:45	Hendry 27'; Kane 90+3'	Report	Long 32'; Donnelly (yellow card) 69'; Manzinga (yellow card) 77' (yellow-red card) 82'; Carroll (yellow card) 90+1'	Attendance: 2,655; Referee: Nick Walsh

15 February 2020 27	Ross County	1–1	St Johnstone	Global Energy Stadium
15:00	McKay 90+4'	Report	May 33'	Attendance: 3,569; Referee: Colin Steven

23 February 2020 28	St Johnstone	2–2	Rangers	McDiarmid Park
13:30	Hendry 8'; Booth (yellow card) 63'; May 80'	Report	Kamberi 53'; Aribo 71'	Attendance: 8,286; Referee: Willie Collum

4 March 2020 29	St Mirren	0–0	St Johnstone	Simple Digital Arena
19:45		Report	Craig (yellow card) 55' (yellow-red card) 79'	Attendance: 4,287; Referee: Euan Anderson

7 March 2020 30	St Johnstone	1–0	Livingston	McDiarmid Park
15:00	Hendry 84'	Report		Attendance: 3,008; Referee: Kevin Clancy

14 March 2020 31 (Note: Match cancelled due to the COVID-19 pandemic)	Hibernian	Cancelled	St Johnstone	Easter Road
15:00

21 March 2020 32	Celtic	Cancelled	St Johnstone	Celtic Park
15:00

4 April 2020 33	St Johnstone	Cancelled	Hamilton Academical	McDiarmid Park
15:00

12	Rangers	Cancelled	St Johnstone	Ibrox Stadium

=== League Cup ===
16 July 2019 Group	Montrose	1–0	St Johnstone	Links Park
19:45	Cregg (yellow card) 40'; Masson 72'	SPFL Report	McClean (yellow card) 75'	Attendance: 866; Referee: Barry Cook

21 July 2019 Group	St Johnstone	1–2	Ross County	McDiarmid Park
15:00	Tanser 8' (pen.); Craig (yellow card) 40'	BBC Report	Mckay 30', 45+1'; Vigurs (yellow card) 40'	Attendance: 1,648; Referee: Bobby Madden
Note: Game televised on BT Sport

24 July 2019 Group	St Johnstone	4–0	Brechin City	McDiarmid Park
19:45	Tanser 6' (pen.); Kane 33'; Hendry 74'; Kennedy 76'	BBC Report	Hill (yellow card) 88'	Attendance: 1,497; Referee: Steven McLean

27 July 2019 Group	Forfar Athletic	2–1	St Johnstone	Station Park
15:00	Tapping 2'; Forbes 53'	BBC Report	Kennedy 65'	Attendance: 1,009; Referee: Euan Anderson

=== Scottish Cup ===
18 January 2020 Fourth Round	St Johnstone	3–0	Greenock Morton	McDiarmid Park
15:00	Booth 4'; Davidson 57'; May 74'	Report		Attendance: 2,397; Referee: Nick Walsh

8 February 2020 Fifth Round	Ayr United	1–2	St Johnstone	Somerset Park
15:01	Drinan 4'	Report	Muirhead 18' (o.g); Hendry 27'	Attendance: 2,625; Referee: Steven McLean

1 March 2020 Quarter-finals	St Johnstone	0–1	Celtic	McDiarmid Park
15:00			Christie 81'	Attendance: Bobby Madden; Referee: 8,181

== Squad statistics ==
=== Appearances ===
As of 7 March 2020

No.	Pos	Player	Premiership		League Cup		Scottish Cup		Total	
No.	Pos	Player	Apps	Goals	Apps	Goals	Apps	Goals	Apps	Goals
1	GK	(Scotland) Zander Clark	29	0	2	0	3	0	34	0
2	DF	(Scotland) Wallace Duffy	11	0	3	0	0+1	0	15	0
3	DF	(England) Scott Tanser	19+2	0	4	2	1+1	0	27	2
4	DF	(Scotland) Jamie McCart	7+1	0	0	0	2	0	10	0
7	MF	(Scotland) Drey Wright	16+6	0	0	0	3	0	25	0
8	MF	(Scotland) Murray Davidson	17	0	3	0	1	1	21	1
9	FW	(Scotland) Chris Kane	11+12	1	2	1	1+2	0	28	2
10	MF	(Canada) David Wotherspoon	15+6	3	1	0	3	0	25	3
11	MF	(Scotland) Danny Swanson	3+4	0	4	0	0	0	11	0
12	GK	(England) Elliot Parish	0	0	2	0	0	0	2	0
14	FW	(Scotland) Stevie May	20+4	6	0	0	3	1	27	7
15	DF	(Scotland) Jason Kerr (c)	29	1	4	0	3	0	36	1
16	MF	(England) Matt Butcher	3+3	0	0	0	1	0	7	0
17	FW	(Scotland) Michael O'Halloran	14+10	2	3	0	0+1	0	28	2
18	MF	(Scotland) Ali McCann	26+3	4	2+1	0	3	0	35	4
19	MF	(Scotland) Jason Holt	15+2	0	0	0	0	0	17	0
20	MF	(England) Isaiah Jones	0	0	0	0	0+1	0	1	0
21	DF	(Scotland) Anthony Ralston	21+1	0	0	0	2	0	24	0
22	FW	(Scotland) Callum Hendry	5+15	7	2+2	1	2+1	1	27	9
23	DF	(Scotland) Liam Gordon	16	0	0	0	2	0	18	0
24	DF	(Scotland) Callum Booth	12+1	0	0	0	2	1	15	1
26	MF	(Scotland) Liam Craig	9+6	0	2	0	1	0	18	0
50	FW	(Scotland) Jordan Northcott	0	0	0+2	0	0	0	2	0
Player who left the club during the season
4	MF	(Scotland) Ross Callachan	1+1	0	1+1	0	0	0	4	0
5	DF	(Estonia) Madis Vihmann	2+2	0	1	0	0	0	5	0
6	DF	(Scotland) Steven Anderson	0	0	1	0	0	0	1	0
16	FW	(Republic of Ireland) David McMillan	0	0	0+3	0	0	0	3	0
19	DF	(Scotland) Ricky Foster	2	0	3	0	0	0	5	0
20	MF	(Northern Ireland) Kyle McClean	0	0	2+1	0	0	0	3	0
33	MF	(Northern Ireland) Matty Kennedy	16+2	3	2+1	2	0	0	21	5
38	MF	(Scotland) Cameron Ballantyne	0	0	0	0	0	0	0	0
40	DF	(Scotland) Samuel Denham	0	0	0	0	0	0	0	0
44	MF	(Scotland) Shaun Struthers	0	0	0	0	0	0	0	0
45	GK	(Scotland) Ross Sinclair	0	0	0	0	0	0	0	0

== Team statistics ==
=== League table ===
Pos	Team	Pld	W	D	L	GF	GA	GD	Pts	PPG	Qualification or relegation (Note: All play-off matches were cancelled, as clubs voted to curtail the season due to the COVID-19 pandemic.)
4	Aberdeen	30	12	9	9	40	36	+4	45	1.50	Qualification for the Europa League first qualifying round
5	Livingston	30	10	9	11	41	39	+2	39	1.30	
6	St Johnstone	29	8	12	9	28	46	−18	36	1.24	
7	Hibernian	30	9	10	11	42	49	−7	37	1.23	
8	Kilmarnock	30	9	6	15	31	41	−10	33	1.10	

Source: BBC SPFL
Rules for classification: 1) Points per game; 2) Goal difference; 3) Goals scored; 4) Head-to-head points; 5) Head-to-Head goal difference; 6) Play-off (only if deciding champion, UEFA competitions qualification, second stage group allocation or relegation).

=== League Cup table ===
Pos	Team	Pld	W	PW	PL	L	GF	GA	GD	Pts	Qualification	ROS	FOR	MON	STJ	BRE
1	Ross County	4	4	0	0	0	12	2	+10	12	Qualification for the Second Round	—	2–0	4–1	—	—
2	Forfar Athletic	4	3	0	0	1	9	4	+5	9	Qualification for the Second Round	—	—	—	2–1	3–0
3	Montrose	4	1	1	0	2	4	9	−5	5		—	1–4	—	1–0	—
4	St Johnstone	4	1	0	0	3	6	5	+1	3		1–2	—	—	—	4–0
5	Brechin City	4	0	0	1	3	1	12	−11	1		0–4	—	1–1p	—	—

Rules for classification: 1) goal difference, 2) goals scored, 3) away goals scored, 4) matches won, 5) away matches won, 6) drawing of lots.

== Transfers ==
=== Players in ===
Date	Player	From	Fee
20 June 2019	(Scotland) Wallace Duffy	(Scotland) Celtic	Free
20 June 2019	(England) Elliot Parish	(Scotland) Dundee	Free
26 July 2019	(Estonia) Madis Vihmann	(Estonia) Flora	Loan
2 August 2019	(England) Max Johnstone	(England) Sunderland	Free
29 August 2019	(Scotland) Stevie May	(Scotland) Aberdeen	Free
2 September 2019	(Scotland) Anthony Ralston	(Scotland) Celtic	Loan
2 September 2019	(Scotland) Jason Holt	(Scotland) Rangers	Loan
16 September 2019	(Scotland) Callum Booth	(Scotland) Dundee United	Free
28 January 2020	(Scotland) Jamie McCart	(Scotland) Inverness CT	Undisclosed
31 January 2020	(England) Matt Butcher	(England) Bournemouth	Loan
31 January 2020	(England) Isaiah Jones	(England) Middlesbrough	Loan

=== Players out ===
Date	Player	To	Fee
16 May 2019	(Scotland) Aaron Comrie	(Scotland) Dunfermline Athletic	Free
27 May 2019	(Scotland) Tony Watt	(Bulgaria) CSKA Sofia	Free
1 June 2019	(Scotland) Jack Hodge	(Scotland) Hibernian	Free
1 June 2019	(Scotland) Brian Easton	(Scotland) Hamilton Academical	Free
6 June 2019	(Scotland) Blair Alston	(Scotland) Hamilton Academical	Free
6 June 2019	(Scotland) Marky Munro	(Scotland) Stenhousemuir	Loan
20 June 2019	(Scotland) Euan O’Reilly	(Scotland) Airdrieonians	Loan
4 July 2019	(Scotland) Olly Hamilton	(Scotland) Brechin City	Loan
1 August 2019	(Republic of Ireland) Joe Shaughnessy	(England) Southend United	Free
2 August 2019	(Scotland) John Robertson	(Scotland) Cove Rangers	Loan
29 August 2019	(Scotland) Richard Foster	(Scotland) Ross County	Free
2 September 2019	(Northern Ireland) Kyle McClean	(Northern Ireland) Linfield	Mutual consent
4 September 2019	(Republic of Ireland) David McMillan	(Scotland) Falkirk	Loan
6 September 2019	(Scotland) Steven Anderson	(Scotland) Raith Rovers	Loan
15 January 2020	(Scotland) Ross Callachan	(Scotland) Dundee	Loan
24 January 2020	(Northern Ireland) Matty Kennedy	(Scotland) Aberdeen	£70,000
31 January 2020	(Estonia) Madis Vihmann	Retired	

== See also ==
- List of St Johnstone F.C. seasons
