= Max Haygarth =

English footballer (born 2002)

Personal information
- Full name: Maxwell James Haygarth
- Date of birth: 21 January 2002 (age 24)
- Place of birth: Manchester, England
- Height: 1.75 m (5 ft 9 in)
- Positions: Winger; midfielder

Youth career
- –2020: Manchester United

Senior career*
Years	Team	Apps	(Gls)
2020–2021	Manchester United	0	(0)
2020–2021	→ Brentford (loan)	1	(0)
2021–2022	Brentford	0	(0)
2023–2024	Linfield	9	(1)
2024–2025	Altrincham	7	(0)
2025	Dubai City	6	(1)
- * Club domestic league appearances and goals as of 21:15, 7 April 2026 (UTC)

Maxwell James Haygarth (born 21 January 2002) is an English professional footballer who plays as a winger or midfielder.

Haygarth is a product of the Manchester United academy and began his senior career with Brentford in 2021. After failing to break into the first team squad and then a period as a free agent, he transferred to Linfield in 2023, for whom he appeared sparingly before his release in early 2024. Three months later, he entered non-League football with Altrincham. Haygarth transferred to UAE club Dubai City in 2025.

== Career ==
=== Manchester United ===
A winger or midfielder, Haygarth entered the Manchester United academy at age 9 and progressed to sign a scholarship in 2018. Despite suffering from recurring injury problems, he made appearances for the club's U18 and U23 teams and departed Carrington in January 2021.

=== Brentford ===
On 16 October 2020, Haygarth joined the B team at Championship club Brentford on loan until January 2021. He won his maiden call into the first team squad for a league match against Nottingham Forest on 12 December 2020 and made his debut as a substitute for Emiliano Marcondes late in the 3–1 win. On 4 January 2021, Haygarth transferred to the club on a permanent basis and signed a 1 1/2-year contract, with the option of a further year. He made two FA Cup appearances in January 2021, but was not involved in Brentford's successful 2021 playoff campaign, which clinched promotion to the Premier League.

Haygarth trained with the first-team squad during the 2021–22 pre-season and was named in each matchday squad during the period. His only senior call-up of the 2021–22 regular season came on 20 November 2021, during an injury crisis, when he remained an unused substitute during a 3–3 Premier League draw with Newcastle United. Following 28 appearances for the B team in just under two seasons with Brentford, Haygarth was released when his contract expired at the end of the 2021–22 season.

=== Linfield ===
Following trials with English Football League clubs Luton Town, Sheffield United, Sheffield Wednesday and Birmingham City, Haygarth joined NIFL Premiership club Linfield on trial in late December 2022. On 7 January 2023, it was announced that he had signed a contract running until the end of the 2022–23 season. Haygarth made 10 appearances and scored one goal, which came two minutes after coming on as an 80th-minute substitute on his debut, with the final goal in a 6–1 victory over Glenavon.

Haygarth signed a new one-year contract in June 2023. Following just one County Antrim Shield appearance during the first half of the 2023–24 season, his contract was terminated by mutual consent on 5 January 2024.

=== Altrincham ===
On 12 March 2024, Haygarth joined National League club Altrincham on a contract running until the 2023–24 season. He made just one appearance before the end of the campaign, which culminated in defeat in the National League play-off semi-finals. Haygarth was invited to return to the club for the 2024–25 pre-season and he signed a new half-season contract in June 2024. After making 9 appearances and scoring one goal during the first half of an injury-affected 2024–25 season, Haygarth was released in January 2025.

=== Dubai City ===
On 21 March 2025, Haygarth transferred to UAE Second Division League club Dubai City. He made six appearances and scored one goal during the remainder of the promotion-winning 2024–25 season.

== Style of play ==
Haygarth has been described as "a technical operator in the middle of the park or attack, who is capable of making a real impact on matches".

== Personal life ==
While a player with Brentford, Haygarth lived in Windsor. In 2025, he set up Coach Haygarth, offering one-on-one football coaching in Dubai.

== Career statistics ==
As of match played 16 May 2025

Appearances and goals by club, season and competition
Club	Season	League			National cup (Note: Includes FA Cup, Irish Cup)		League cup (Note: Includes EFL Cup, Northern Ireland League Cup, National League Cup)		Continental		Other		Total	
Club	Season	Division	Apps	Goals	Apps	Goals	Apps	Goals	Apps	Goals	Apps	Goals	Apps	Goals
Manchester United U21	2020–21	―									1 (Note: Appearance in EFL Trophy)	0	1	0
Brentford	2020–21	Championship	1	0	2	0	0	0	―		0	0	3	0
Brentford	2021–22	Premier League	0	0	0	0	0	0	―		―		0	0
Brentford	Total		1	0	2	0	0	0	―		0	0	4	0
Linfield	2022–23	NIFL Premiership	9	1	1	0	0	0	―		0	0	10	1
Linfield	2023–24	NIFL Premiership	0	0	0	0	0	0	0	0	1 (Note: Appearance in County Antrim Shield)	0	1	0
Linfield	Total		9	1	1	0	0	0	0	0	1	0	11	1
Altrincham	2023–24	National League	1	0	―		―		―		0	0	1	0
Altrincham	2024–25	National League	6	0	1	0	1	0	―		1 (Note: Appearance in Cheshire Senior Cup)	1	9	1
Altrincham	Total		7	0	1	0	1	0	―		1	1	10	1
Dubai City	2024–25	UAE Second Division League	6	1	―		―		―		―		6	1
Career total			23	2	4	0	1	0	0	0	3	1	31	3

== Honours ==
Dubai City

- UAE Second Division League: 2024–25
