= Patrik Gunnarsson =

Icelandic footballer (born 2000)

Personal information
- Full name: Patrik Sigurður Gunnarsson
- Date of birth: 15 November 2000 (age 25)
- Place of birth: Kópavogur, Iceland
- Height: 1.90 m (6 ft 3 in)
- Position: Goalkeeper

Team information
- Current team: Kortrijk
- Number: 1

Youth career
- –2017: Breiðablik

Senior career*
Years	Team	Apps	(Gls)
2017–2018	Breiðablik	0	(0)
2018	→ ÍR (loan)	5	(0)
2018–2022	Brentford	1	(0)
2020	→ Southend United (loan)	3	(0)
2020	→ Viborg FF (loan)	12	(0)
2021	→ Silkeborg IF (loan)	14	(0)
2021	→ Viking (loan)	7	(0)
2022–2024	Viking	72	(0)
2024–	Kortrijk	12	(0)

International career^{‡}
2016	Iceland U16	4	(0)
2016	Iceland U17	3	(0)
2017	Iceland U18	3	(0)
2018	Iceland U19	4	(0)
2019–2021	Iceland U21	12	(0)
2022–2024	Iceland	4	(0)
- * Club domestic league appearances and goals as of 21:46, 13 September 2026 (UTC) ‡ National team caps and goals as of 17:08, 10 September 2024 (UTC)

Patrik Sigurður Gunnarsson (born 15 November 2000) is an Icelandic professional footballer who plays as a goalkeeper for Belgian Pro League club Kortrijk.

A product of the Breiðablik academy and Brentford B, Patrik played the majority of his early senior career away on loan from the two clubs. Following a successful loan spell with Viking in 2021, he transferred permanently to the club the following year. Following 2 1/2 years as Viking's first choice goalkeeper, Patrik transferred to Belgian club Kortrijk in 2024. Patrik was capped by Iceland at youth level and made his senior international debut in 2022.

== Club career ==
=== Breiðablik ===
A goalkeeper, Patrik progressed through the Breiðablik academy in his native Iceland to make two appearances for the club's U19 team in the 2016–17 UEFA Youth League, while aged 15. He appeared again in the 2017–18 edition of the tournament. Patrik was unused substitute for the first team on three occasions during the 2017 season and in May 2017, he signed a 2 1/2-year contract.

Patrik signed a new three-year contract in November 2017 and joined 1. deild karla club ÍR on loan for the duration of the 2018 season. He made 10 appearances before the loan was terminated on 8 June 2018, the same day on which he departed the club permanently.

=== Brentford ===
==== 2018–19 season ====
On 8 June 2018, Patrik moved to England to join the B team at Championship club Brentford on a two-year contract, with the option of a further year, effective 1 July 2018. Injuries to second and third-choice goalkeepers Luke Daniels and Ellery Balcombe saw Patrik win his maiden calls into the first team squad in early-March 2019 and he made his debut as a 75th-minute substitute for Dan Bentley in a 2–1 victory over Middlesbrough on 9 March. He made 31 appearances for the B team during the 2018–19 season and was a part of the squad which won the 2018–19 Middlesex Senior Cup.

==== 2019–20 season and loan to Southend United ====
In June 2019, Patrik signed a new four-year contract, with the option of a further year and was a part of the first team squad during the majority of the 2019–20 pre-season. He was promoted into the first team squad in September 2019 and was an unused substitute in cup matches during the season. On 20 February 2020, Patrik joined League One club Southend United on a seven-day emergency loan, which was subsequently extended by two further weeks. He made three appearances during his spell.

==== 2020–2022 and loans ====
Patrik spent the entire 2020–21 season away on loan at Danish 1st Division clubs Viborg FF and Silkeborg IF, switching clubs during the mid-season transfer window. He made 26 appearances during the season and both clubs secured promotion to the Danish Superliga. In his absence, Brentford were promoted to the Premier League after victory in the 2021 Championship play-off final. After remaining an unused substitute during two early 2021–22 season matches, Patrik departed on loan until the end of 2021. Following the spell, he transferred away from the Community Stadium in January 2022.

=== Viking FK ===
On 30 August 2021, Patrik joined Norwegian Eliteserien club Viking on loan until the end of the 2021 season. He made eight appearances during his spell and helped the team to a third-place finish, which secured a Europa Conference League berth. On 17 January 2022, Patrik signed a four-year contract with the club for an undisclosed fee and he made 37 appearances during a mid-table 2022 season. He made 32 appearances during a 2023 season in which the club narrowly missed European qualification. Following 14 appearances during the first half of the 2024 season, Patrik transferred out of the club in July 2024. He made 91 appearances during just shy of four years at the Viking Stadion.

=== Kortrijk ===
On 16 July 2024, Patrik transferred to Belgian Pro League club Kortrijk and signed a four-year contract for an undisclosed fee. He made 11 appearances before his 2024–25 season was ended prematurely by injury in late December 2024. During rehab from the injury, Guillain–Barré syndrome was diagnosed. In Patrik's absence, Kortrijk were relegated to the Challenger Pro League. He missed the entire 2025–26 season, in which the club was promoted back to the Pro League. Patrik returned to match play during the 2026–27 pre-season period and made his first competituve appearance for 693 days with a start in a 3–0 defeat to RAAL La Louvière on 13 September 2026.

== International career ==
Patrik has been capped by Iceland at U16, U17, U18, U19 and U21 level. In March 2021, Patrik was named in Iceland's 2021 UEFA European U21 Championship finals squad and played in two of the three group stage matches before the team's elimination.

Patrik received his first call-up to the senior team for two friendly matches in January 2020 and remained an unused substitute in both. After featuring as an unused substitute during a 5–1 2020–21 UEFA Nations League A defeat to Belgium in September 2020, Patrik was an unused substitute during six 2022 FIFA World Cup qualifiers in 2021. He remained an unused substitute during two 2022–23 UEFA Nations League B matches, before making his senior international debut with a start in a 1–0 friendly victory over San Marino on 9 June 2022. Patrik's second cap came in the 2022 Baltic Cup Final, where his penalty save in the shoot-out versus Latvia saw Iceland win the tournament. Patrik's third cap came in the following match, a 1–1 friendly draw versus Estonia on 1 January 2023 and he remained a regular inclusion in matchday squads until March 2023.

== Personal life ==
Patrik is the son of retired goalkeeper Gunnar Sigurðsson. He is a Breiðablik and Manchester United supporter. He has a daughter. In May 2022, a scandal erupted In Norway, when a video published by Stavanger Aftenblad showed Patrik reducing the size of his goal, by literally moving the goalposts 15–20 centimetres inwards, after the referee's inspection, but prior to kick-off, in home matches during the early months of the 2022 season.

== Career statistics ==
=== Club ===
As of match played 13 September 2026

Appearances and goals by club, season and competition
Club	Season	League			National cup (Note: Includes Icelandic Cup, FA Cup, Danish Cup, Norwegian Cup, Belgian Cup)		League cup (Note: Includes Icelandic League Cup, EFL Cup)		Europe		Other		Total	
Club	Season	Division	Apps	Goals	Apps	Goals	Apps	Goals	Apps	Goals	Apps	Goals	Apps	Goals
Breiðablik	2017	Úrvalsdeild	0	0	0	0	0	0	―		―		0	0
ÍR (loan)	2018	1. deild karla	5	0	3	0	2	0	―		―		10	0
Brentford	2018–19	Championship	1	0	0	0	0	0	―		―		1	0
Brentford	2019–20	Championship	0	0	0	0	0	0	―		0	0	0	0
Brentford	2021–22	Premier League	0	0	0	0	0	0	―		―		0	0
Brentford	Total		1	0	0	0	0	0	―		0	0	1	0
Southend United (loan)	2019–20	League One	3	0	―		―		―		―		3	0
Viborg FF (loan)	2020–21	Danish 1st Division	12	0	0	0	―		―		―		12	0
Silkeborg IF (loan)	2020–21	Danish 1st Division	14	0	―		―		―		―		14	0
Viking (loan)	2021	Eliteserien	7	0	3	0	―		―		―		10	0
Viking	2022	Eliteserien	28	0	3	0	―		6 (Note: Appearances in UEFA Europa Conference League)	0	―		37	0
Viking	2023	Eliteserien	30	0	0	0	―		―		―		30	0
Viking	2024	Eliteserien	14	0	0	0	―		―		―		14	0
Viking	Total		72	0	3	0	―		6	0	―		81	0
Kortrijk	2024–25	Belgian Pro League	11	0	0	0	―		―		―		11	0
Kortrijk	2025–26	Challenger Pro League	0	0	0	0	―		―		―		0	0
Kortrijk	2026–27	Belgian Pro League	1	0	0	0	―		―		―		1	0
Kortrijk	Total		12	0	0	0	―		―		―		82	0
Career total			126	0	9	0	2	0	6	0	0	0	143	0

=== International ===
As of match played 9 September 2024

Appearances and goals by national team and year
National team	Year	Apps	Goals
Iceland	2022	2	0
Iceland	2023	1	0
Iceland	2024	1	0
Total		4	0

== Honours ==
Brentford B

- Middlesex Senior Cup: 2018–19

Viborg FF

- Danish 1st Division: 2020–21

Silkeborg IF

- Danish 1st Division second-place promotion: 2020–21

Iceland

- Baltic Cup: 2022
