= Woodcote High School =

Location
- Meadow Rise; Coulsdon, London, CR5 2EH; England
- Coordinates: 51°19′51″N 0°08′29″W

Information
- Type: Academy
- Established: 5 July 1957
- Local authority: London Borough of Croydon
- Specialist: Sports College, Mathematics and Computing College
- Department for Education URN: 138187 Tables
- Ofsted: Reports
- Gender: Coeducational
- Age: 11 to 18
- Houses: Moore; Thompson; Redgrave; Holmes
- Website: https://woodcotehigh.org.uk/

Woodcote High School is a secondary school with academy status located in Coulsdon in the London Borough of Croydon, England.

Woodcote is a coeducational school, of around 1200 students. The school gained Specialist Sports College and Mathematics and Computing College status and became an academy in 2012.

== Ofsted ==
In its first Ofsted inspection report as an academy, the school was assessed at grade 3 (requires improvement) in 2013. In 2015 the school was given an overall grade 2 (good) with individual grades being awarded as grade 2 in all areas. The school maintained its standing of "Good" in a 2018 short inspection and again in 2024.

== Track Coulsdon ==
In cooperation with South London Harriers an 8-lane all-weather running track has been built at the school. It includes a full size football pitch.

South London Harriers have a 100-year agreement with Woodcote High School which began in 2012 to use and jointly manage the Track Coulsdon facility. The area of land on which the track is built is protected from development for 100 years until 2113 by an agreement with the QEII Fields in Trust.

== Notable alumni ==
- Steve Sidwell (born 1982), footballer
- Jack Hingert(born 1990), footballer
- Stefan O'Connor (born 1997), footballer
- Lee Brown (born 1990), footballer
- Raye (born 1997), musician
- Percelle Ascott (born 1993), actor and writer
- Alex Tapp (born 1982), footballer
- Tino Livramento (born 2002), footballer
- Nathan Young-Coombes (born 2003), footballer
- Wesley Fonguck (born 1997), footballer
- Ali Koiki (born 1999), footballer
- Myles Kenlock (born 1996), footballer
- Leon McKenzie (born 1978), footballer
