= 2021–22 Brentford F.C. season =

English football team season

Brentford F.C.
2021–22 season
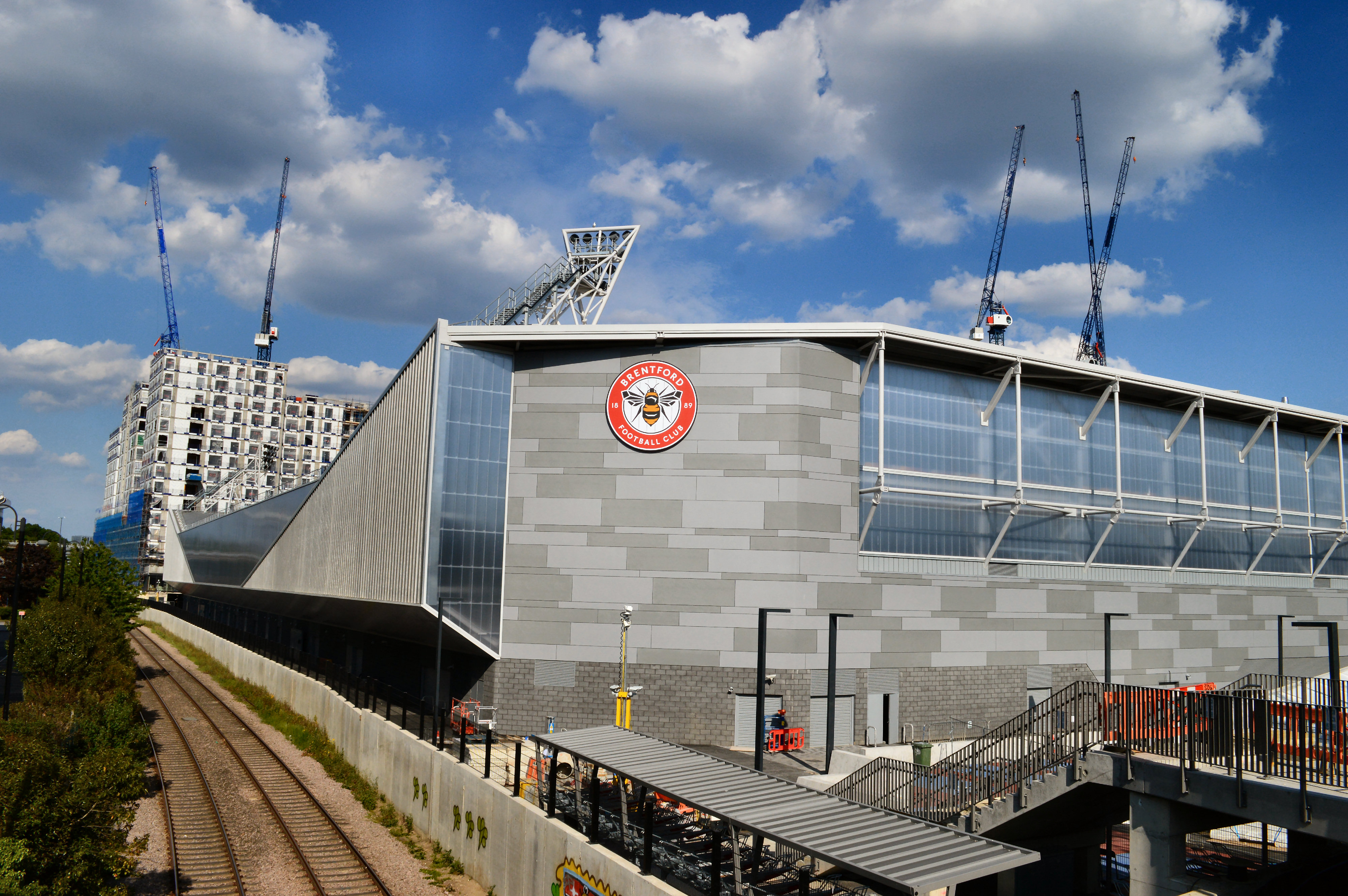
- Brentford Community Stadium, the club's new stadium, completed in 2020 ahead of Premier League promotion
- Owner: Matthew Benham
- Head coach: Thomas Frank
- Stadium: Brentford Community Stadium
- Premier League: 13th
- FA Cup: Fourth round
- EFL Cup: Quarter-finals
- Top goalscorer: League: Ivan Toney (12); All: Ivan Toney (14)
Home colours	Away colours	Third colours

The 2021–22 Brentford F.C. season was the club's 132nd season in existence and first season in the Premier League, the top tier of English football. Brentford also competed in the FA Cup and the EFL Cup. The season covers the period from 1 July 2021 to 30 June 2022. Brentford secured promotion to the Premier League on 29 May 2021, following a 2–0 victory against Swansea City in the play-off final at Wembley, confirming the club's top flight status for the first time in 74 years.

== First team squad ==
Players' ages are as of the opening day of the 2021–22 season.

#	Name	Nationality	Position	Date of birth (age)	Signed from	Signed in	Notes
Goalkeepers
1	David Raya	(Spain)	GK	15 September 1995 (aged 25)	Blackburn Rovers	2019	
40	Álvaro Fernández	(Spain)	GK	13 April 1998 (aged 23)	Huesca	2021	On loan from Huesca
41	Matthew Cox	(England)	GK	2 May 2003 (aged 18)	AFC Wimbledon	2021	
49	Jonas Lössl	(Denmark)	GK	1 February 1989 (aged 32)	FC Midtjylland	2022	On loan from FC Midtjylland
—	Ellery Balcombe	(England)	GK	15 October 1999 (aged 21)	Academy	2016	Loaned to Burton Albion and Bromley
Defenders
2	Dominic Thompson	(England)	LB	26 July 2000 (aged 21)	Arsenal	2019	Loaned to Ipswich Town
3	Rico Henry	(Jamaica)	LB	8 July 1997 (aged 24)	Walsall	2016	
4	Charlie Goode	(England)	CB	3 August 1995 (aged 26)	Northampton Town	2020	Loaned to Sheffield United
5	Ethan Pinnock	(Jamaica)	CB	29 May 1993 (aged 28)	Barnsley	2019	
18	Pontus Jansson (c)	(Sweden)	CB	13 February 1991 (aged 30)	Leeds United	2019	
20	Kristoffer Ajer	(Norway)	CB / RB	17 April 1998 (aged 23)	Celtic	2021	
22	Zanka	(Denmark)	CB	23 April 1990 (aged 31)	Fenerbahçe	2021	
23	Julian Jeanvier	(Guinea)	CB	31 March 1992 (aged 29)	Reims	2018	
29	Mads Bech Sørensen	(Denmark)	CB	7 January 1999 (aged 22)	AC Horsens	2017	
30	Mads Roerslev	(Denmark)	RB	24 June 1999 (aged 22)	F.C. Copenhagen	2019	
32	Luka Racic	(Denmark)	CB	8 May 1999 (aged 22)	F.C. Copenhagen	2018	Loaned to HB Køge
34	Daniel Oyegoke	(England)	RB	3 January 2003 (aged 18)	Arsenal	2021	
36	Fin Stevens	(Wales)	RB	10 April 2003 (aged 18)	Worthing	2020	
39	Lewis Gordon	(Scotland)	LB	12 February 2001 (aged 20)	Watford	2020	
Midfielders
6	Christian Nørgaard	(Denmark)	DM	10 March 1994 (aged 27)	Fiorentina	2019	
8	Mathias Jensen	(Denmark)	CM	1 January 1996 (aged 25)	Celta	2019	
10	Josh Dasilva	(England)	AM	23 October 1998 (aged 22)	Arsenal	2018	
14	Saman Ghoddos	(Iran)	AM	6 September 1993 (aged 27)	Amiens	2021	
15	Frank Onyeka	(Nigeria)	DM	1 January 1998 (aged 23)	FC Midtjylland	2021	
21	Christian Eriksen	(Denmark)	AM	14 February 1992 (aged 29)	Unattached	2022	
25	Myles Peart-Harris	(England)	AM	18 September 2002 (aged 18)	Chelsea	2021	
26	Shandon Baptiste	(Grenada)	CM	8 April 1998 (aged 23)	Oxford United	2020	
27	Vitaly Janelt	(Germany)	DM	10 May 1998 (aged 23)	VfL Bochum	2020	
28	Mads Bidstrup	(Denmark)	MF	25 February 2001 (aged 20)	RB Leipzig	2020	Loaned to Nordsjælland
33	Paris Maghoma	(England)	CM	8 May 2001 (aged 20)	Tottenham Hotspur	2020	
Attackers
7	Sergi Canós	(Spain)	W / RWB	2 February 1997 (aged 24)	Norwich City	2017	
9	Marcus Forss	(Finland)	FW	18 June 1999 (aged 22)	West Bromwich Albion	2017	Loaned to Hull City
11	Yoane Wissa	(Democratic Republic of the Congo)	W / FW	3 September 1996 (aged 24)	Lorient	2021	
16	Joel Valencia	(Ecuador)	W	16 November 1994 (aged 26)	Piast Gliwice	2019	Loaned to Alcorcón
17	Ivan Toney	(England)	FW	16 March 1996 (aged 25)	Peterborough United	2020	
19	Bryan Mbeumo	(France)	W / FW	7 August 1999 (aged 22)	Troyes	2019	
~~21~~	Halil Dervişoğlu	(Turkey)	FW	8 December 1999 (aged 21)	Sparta Rotterdam	2020	Loaned to Galatasaray
24	Tariqe Fosu	(Ghana)	LW	5 November 1995 (aged 25)	Oxford United	2020	
37	Max Haygarth	(England)	W	21 January 2002 (aged 19)	Manchester United	2020	
43	Nathan Young-Coombes	(England)	FW	15 January 2003 (aged 18)	Rangers	2021	
Players who left the club mid-season
13	Patrik Gunnarsson	(Iceland)	GK	15 November 2000 (aged 20)	Breiðablik	2018	Loaned to Viking, transferred to Viking
31	Jan Žambůrek	(Czech Republic)	CM	13 February 2001 (aged 20)	Slavia Prague	2018	Transferred to Viborg FF

== Transfers ==
=== Transfers in ===
Date	Position	Nationality	Name	From	Fee	Ref.
1 July 2021 (Note: Jefferies' transfer was announced on 24 June 2021 and his contract commenced on 1 July 2021.)	CM	(Wales)	Dom Jefferies	(England) Salisbury	Compensation	
1 July 2021	RB	(England)	Daniel Oyegoke	(England) Arsenal	Undisclosed	
1 July 2021	CB	(England)	Jude Russell	(England) Crystal Palace	Free transfer	
1 July 2021 (Note: Young-Coombes' transfer was announced on 9 June 2021 and his contract commenced on 1 July 2021.)	FW	(England)	Nathan Young-Coombes	(Scotland) Rangers	Undisclosed	
20 July 2021	DM	(Nigeria)	Frank Onyeka	(Denmark) FC Midtjylland	£8,000,000	
21 July 2021	CB	(Norway)	Kristoffer Ajer	(Scotland) Celtic	£13,500,000	
22 July 2021	GK	(England)	Matthew Cox	(England) AFC Wimbledon	Undisclosed	
23 July 2021	AM	(England)	Myles Peart-Harris	(England) Chelsea	£1,400,000	
10 August 2021	LW	(Democratic Republic of the Congo)	Yoane Wissa	(France) Lorient	£8,500,000	
15 August 2021	CB	(Republic of Ireland)	Nico Jones	(England) Oxford United	Free transfer	
24 August 2021	LB	(Republic of Ireland)	Val Adedokun	(Republic of Ireland) Dundalk	Undisclosed	
9 September 2021	CB	(Denmark)	Zanka	(Turkey) Fenerbahçe	Free transfer	
10 September 2021	GK	(England)	Roco Rees	Free agent	Free transfer	
23 October 2021	DM	(Albania)	Roy Syla	Free agent	Free transfer	
31 January 2022	AM	(Denmark)	Christian Eriksen	Free agent	Free transfer	
31 January 2022	FW	(Netherlands)	Hans Mpongo	(England) Needham Market	Undisclosed	

=== Loans in ===
Date	Position	Nationality	Name	From	Date until	Ref.
17 August 2021	GK	(Spain)	Álvaro Fernández	(Spain) Huesca	End of season	
1 January 2022	GK	(Denmark)	Jonas Lössl	(Denmark) FC Midtjylland	End of season	
31 January 2022	LW	(Republic of Ireland)	Deji Sotona	(France) OGC Nice	End of season	

=== Loans out ===
Date	Position	Nationality	Name	To	Date until	Ref.
1 July 2021	GK	(England)	Ellery Balcombe	(England) Burton Albion	4 January 2022 (Note: Balcombe was recalled from his season-long loan at Burton Albion on 4 January 2022.)	
16 July 2021	FW	(Scotland)	Aaron Pressley	(England) AFC Wimbledon	End of season	
30 August 2021	GK	(Iceland)	Patrik Gunnarsson	(Norway) Viking	31 December 2021	
31 August 2021	LW	(Republic of Ireland)	Alex Gilbert	(England) Swindon Town	4 January 2022 (Note: Gilbert was recalled from his season-long loan at Swindon Town on 4 January 2022.)	
31 August 2021	CM	(Finland)	Jaakko Oksanen	(Scotland) Greenock Morton	3 January 2022	
1 September 2021	FW	(Turkey)	Halil Dervişoğlu	(Turkey) Galatasaray	End of season	
12 January 2022	FW	(Australia)	Lachlan Brook	(Australia) Adelaide United	End of season	
18 January 2022	W	(Ecuador)	Joel Valencia	(Spain) Alcorcón	End of season	
27 January 2022	LB	(England)	Dominic Thompson	(England) Ipswich Town	End of season	
29 January 2022	CM	(Denmark)	Mads Bidstrup	(Denmark) Nordsjælland	End of season	
31 January 2022	CB	(England)	Charlie Goode	(England) Sheffield United	End of season	
31 January 2022	CB	(Denmark)	Luka Racic	(Denmark) HB Køge	End of season	
31 January 2022	FW	(Finland)	Marcus Forss	(England) Hull City	End of season	
31 January 2022	GK	(England)	Ellery Balcombe	(England) Bromley	End of season	
12 May 2022	FW	(Netherlands)	Hans Mpongo	(Iceland) ÍBV	End of season	

=== Transfers out ===
Date	Position	Nationality	Name	To	Fee	Ref.
30 June 2021	DM	(France)	Julien Carré	Free agent	Released	
30 June 2021	RB	(Denmark)	Henrik Dalsgaard	(Denmark) FC Midtjylland	Released	
30 June 2021	GK	(England)	Luke Daniels	(England) Middlesbrough	Released	
30 June 2021	CB	(France)	Aubrel Koutsimouka	(France) Brest II	Released	
30 June 2021	AM	(Denmark)	Emiliano Marcondes	(England) Bournemouth	Released	
30 June 2021	CB	(Scotland)	Kane O'Connor	(Scotland) Cowdenbeath	Released	
30 June 2021	GK	(Northern Ireland)	Jared Thompson	(Denmark) FC Midtjylland	Released	
7 January 2022	GK	(Wales)	Nathan Shepperd	(Republic of Ireland) Dundalk	Undisclosed	
12 January 2022	CM	(Czech Republic)	Jan Žambůrek	(Denmark) Viborg FF	Undisclosed	
12 January 2022	LW	(Wales)	Joe Adams	(Republic of Ireland) Dundalk	Undisclosed	
17 January 2022	GK	(Iceland)	Patrik Gunnarsson	(Norway) Viking	Undisclosed	

== Pre-season and friendlies ==
Win Draw Loss Fixtures

13 July 2021 Friendly	Brentford XI	Cancelled	Sutton United	Farnborough
19:45 BST				Stadium: Cherrywood Road
Note: Match was postponed due to COVID-19 isolation guidelines.

17 July 2021 Friendly	AFC Wimbledon	0–1	Brentford	Wimbledon
15:00 BST		Report	Valencia 42'	Stadium: Plough Lane; Attendance: 2,500; Referee: Craig Hicks

18 July 2021 Friendly	Hampton & Richmond Borough	v	Brentford XI	Hampton
15:00 BST				Stadium: The Beveree Stadium
Note: Match was postponed due to COVID-19 isolation guidelines.

20 July 2021 Friendly	Boreham Wood	0–2	Brentford	Borehamwood
19:30 BST		Report	Toney 23'; Fosu 57'	Stadium: Meadow Park

23 July 2021 Friendly	Cambridge United	1–3	Brentford XI	St Neots
18:30 BST	Knibbs	Report	Trevitt; Adams (pen.); Young-Coombes	Stadium: New Rowley Park; Attendance: 726; Referee: Josh Smith

24 July 2021 Friendly	Watford	1–3	Brentford	St Albans
12:00 BST	Wise (pen.)	Report	Toney; Dervişoğlu	Stadium: Watford Football Club Training Ground; Attendance: 0

28 July 2021 Friendly	Manchester United	2–2	Brentford	Trafford
20:00 BST	Elanga 12'; Pereira 50'	Report	Baptiste 20'; Mbeumo 78'	Stadium: Old Trafford; Attendance: 30,000; Referee: Craig Pawson; Assistant referees: Scott Ledger, Nick Greenhalgh; Fourth official: Jeremy Simpson

31 July 2021 Friendly	Brentford	0–1	West Ham United	Brentford
15:00 BST		Report	Benrahma 66'	Stadium: Brentford Community Stadium

4 August 2021 Friendly	Southend United	2–3	Brentford XI	Southend-on-Sea
19:00 BST	Bridge 5'; Dalby 17'	Report	Adams 20' (pen.), 36'; Brook 54'	Stadium: Roots Hall

7 August 2021 Friendly	Brentford	2–1	Valencia	Brentford
17:30 BST	Pinnock 64'; Onyeka 71'	Report	López 30'	Stadium: Brentford Community Stadium; Attendance: 10,000; Referee: Robert Jones

2 September 2021 Friendly	Arsenal	4–0	Brentford XI	London Colney
BST	Gabriel 46'; Lacazette 60'; Cédric 75', 90'	Report		Stadium: Arsenal Training Centre; Attendance: 0

10 November 2021 Friendly	Brentford XI	4–1	Luton Town	Hayes
	Janelt 33'; Peart-Harris 43'; Haygarth (pen.); Young-Coombes	Report	Mendes Gomes 46'	Stadium: Beaconsfield Road; Attendance: 0

30 November 2021 Friendly	Brentford XI	1–2	Coventry City	East Molesey
BST	Young-Coombes 32'	Report	Tavares 24'; Jones 90'	Stadium: Imber Court; Attendance: 0

6 December 2021 Friendly	Brentford XI	6–0	Barnet	Osterley
	Wissa 19', 20'; Ghoddos; Thompson; Jensen; Peart-Harris	Report		Stadium: Jersey Road; Attendance: 0

3 January 2022 Friendly	Brentford XI	2–1	Eastbourne Borough	Osterley
	Janelt; Forss	Report	Gravata	Stadium: Jersey Road; Attendance: 0

17 January 2022 Friendly	Brentford XI	2–1	Havant & Waterlooville	Osterley
	Thompson; Young-Coombes	Report	(pen.)	Stadium: Jersey Road; Attendance: 0

1 February 2022 Friendly	Aston Villa	2–1	Brentford XI	Aston, Birmingham
	Watkins 56'; Mings 72'	Report	Dasilva	Stadium: Villa Park; Attendance: 0

14 February 2022 Friendly	Brentford XI	3–2	Southend United XI	Osterley
	Dasilva	Report	Dunne; Gard	Stadium: Jersey Road; Attendance: 0

21 February 2022 Friendly	Rangers XI	2–2	Brentford XI	Milngavie
	Diallo	Report	Zanka 15'; Crama	Stadium: Rangers Training Centre; Attendance: 0

7 March 2022 Friendly	Brentford XI	2–3	Wycombe Wanderers	Osterley
	Wissa 38', 88'	Report	Al-Hamadi 25'; Forino-Joseph; Wheeler 90'	Stadium: Jersey Road; Attendance: 0

5 April 2022 Friendly	Leyton Orient	0–0	Brentford XI	Leyton
		Report		Stadium: Brisbane Road; Attendance: 0

15 April 2022 Friendly	Brentford XI	1–5	Aston Villa	Osterley
		Report		Stadium: Jersey Road; Attendance: 0

10 May 2022 Friendly	Brentford XI	3–0	Leicester City U23	Osterley
	Jeanvier; Fosu; Stevens	Report		Stadium: Jersey Road; Attendance: 0

17 May 2022 Friendly	Brentford XI	0–0	Valencia B	Hayes
		Report		Stadium: Beaconsfield Road; Attendance: 0

== Competitions ==
=== Overview ===
Competition	First match	Last match	Starting round	Final position	Record							
Competition	First match	Last match	Starting round	Final position	Pld	W	D	L	GF	GA	GD	Win %
Premier League	13 August 2021	22 May 2022	Matchday 1	13th	38	13	7	18	48	56	−8	34.21
FA Cup	8 January 2022	5 February 2022	Third round	Fourth round	2	1	0	1	5	5	+0	50.00
EFL Cup	24 August 2021	22 December 2021	Second round	Quarter-finals	4	3	0	1	12	4	+8	75.00
Total					44	17	7	20	65	65	+0	38.64

Source: Soccerway

=== Premier League ===
==== League table ====
Pos	Team	Pld	W	D	L	GF	GA	GD	Pts
11	Newcastle United	38	13	10	15	44	62	−18	49
12	Crystal Palace	38	11	15	12	50	46	+4	48
13	Brentford	38	13	7	18	48	56	−8	46
14	Aston Villa	38	13	6	19	52	54	−2	45
15	Southampton	38	9	13	16	43	67	−24	40

Source: Premier League
Rules for classification: 1) Points; 2) Goal difference; 3) Goals scored; 4) If the champions, relegated teams or qualified teams for UEFA competitions cannot be determined by rules 1 to 3, rules 4.1 to 4.3 are applied – 4.1) Points gained in head-to-head record between such teams; 4.2) Away goals scored in head-to-head record between such teams; 4.3) Play-offs

==== Results summary ====
Overall								Home						Away					
Pld	W	D	L	GF	GA	GD	Pts	W	D	L	GF	GA	GD	W	D	L	GF	GA	GD
38	13	7	18	48	56	−8	46	7	3	9	22	21	+1	6	4	9	26	35	−9

Source: Premier League

==== Results by round ====
Round	1	2	3	4	5	6	7	8	9	10	11	12	13	14	15	16	17	18	19	20	21	22	23	24	25	26	27	28	29	30	31	32	33	34	35	36	37	38
Ground	H	A	A	H	A	H	A	H	H	A	H	A	H	A	A	H	H	A	H	A	A	H	H	A	H	A	H	A	H	A	A	H	A	H	A	H	A	H
Result	W	D	D	L	W	D	W	L	L	L	L	D	W	L	D	W	L	L	W	L	L	L	L	L	D	L	L	W	W	L	W	W	W	D	L	W	W	L
Position	6	8	10	10	9	9	7	9	12	12	14	14	12	12	13	12	13	14	13	13	14	14	14	14	14	14	15	15	15	15	14	13	14	14	14	12	11	13

Source: Premier League
A = Away; H = Home; W = Win; D = Draw; L = Loss

==== Matches ====
13 August 2021 1	Brentford	2–0	Arsenal	Brentford
20:00 BST	Canós 22'; Nørgaard 73'	Report		Stadium: Brentford Community Stadium; Attendance: 16,479; Referee: Michael Oliver
Note: Live on Sky Sports

21 August 2021 2	Crystal Palace	0–0	Brentford	Selhurst
15:00 BST	Anderson (yellow card) 28'; Benteke (yellow card) 59'; Ward (yellow card) 76'	Report	Nørgaard (yellow card) 52'	Stadium: Selhurst Park; Attendance: 23,091; Referee: Martin Atkinson

28 August 2021 3	Aston Villa	1–1	Brentford	Aston, Birmingham
15:00 BST	Buendía 13'; El Ghazi (yellow card) 50'; Cash (yellow card) 61'; Ings (yellow card) 72'	Report	Toney 7', (yellow card) 52'; Nørgaard (yellow card) 60'; Janelt (yellow card) 75'	Stadium: Villa Park; Attendance: 42,045; Referee: Peter Bankes

11 September 2021 4	Brentford	0–1	Brighton & Hove Albion	Brentford
15:00 BST	Canós (yellow card) 6'; Mbeumo (yellow card) 17'; Ajer (yellow card) 74'	Report	Veltman (yellow card) 55'; Duffy (yellow card) 57'; Trossard 90'	Stadium: Brentford Community Stadium; Attendance: 16,518; Referee: Graham Scott

18 September 2021 5	Wolverhampton Wanderers	0–2	Brentford	Wolverhampton
12:30 BST	Sá (yellow card) 27'; Saïss (yellow card) 38'; Neves (yellow card) 58'; Coady (yellow card) 90+6'	Report	Toney 28' (pen.); Mbeumo 34'; Henry (yellow card) 46'; Baptiste (yellow card) 59' (yellow-red card) 64'; Jansson (yellow card) 74'	Stadium: Molineux; Attendance: 29,724; Referee: Darren England

25 September 2021 6	Brentford	3–3	Liverpool	Brentford
17:30 BST	Pinnock 27'; Onyeka (yellow card) 44'; Janelt 63'; Wissa 82'	Report	Jota 31'; Salah 54'; Jones 67'; Robertson (yellow card) 70'	Stadium: Brentford Community Stadium; Attendance: 16,876; Referee: Stuart Attwell

3 October 2021 7	West Ham United	1–2	Brentford	Stratford
14:00 BST	Zouma (yellow card) 35'; Bowen 80'; Rice (yellow card) 90+2'	Report	Mbeumo 20'; Nørgaard (yellow card) 69'; Canós (yellow card) 84'; Zanka (yellow card) 85'; Wissa 90+4'	Stadium: London Stadium; Attendance: 49,940; Referee: Peter Bankes

16 October 2021 8	Brentford	0–1	Chelsea	Brentford
17:30 BST	Canós (yellow card) 32'	Report	Kovačić (yellow card) 18'; Chilwell 45'	Stadium: Brentford Community Stadium; Attendance: 16,940; Referee: Anthony Taylor

24 October 2021 9	Brentford	1–2	Leicester City	Brentford
14:00 BST	Zanka (yellow card) 30', (goal) 60'	Report	Tielemans 14'; Söyüncü (yellow card) 63'; Maddison 73'	Stadium: Brentford Community Stadium; Attendance: 16,814; Referee: Simon Hooper

30 October 2021 10	Burnley	3–1	Brentford	Burnley
15:00 BST	Wood 4'; Lowton 32'; Cornet 36'; McNeil (yellow card) 83'	Report	Ghoddos (yellow card) 72', (goal) 79'	Stadium: Turf Moor; Attendance: 18,181; Referee: Jonathan Moss

6 November 2021 11	Brentford	1–2	Norwich City	Brentford
15:00 GMT	Toney (yellow card) 4'; Goode (yellow card) 28'; Henry 60'	Report	Normann 6', (yellow card) 32'; Pukki 29' (pen.); Omobamidele (yellow card) 52'; Aarons (yellow card) 90'	Stadium: Brentford Community Stadium; Attendance: 16,837; Referee: Jarred Gillett

20 November 2021 12	Newcastle United	3–3	Brentford	Newcastle upon Tyne
15:00 GMT	Lascelles 10'; Joelinton 39'; Wilson (yellow card) 46'; Saint-Maximin 75', (yellow card) 75'	Report	Toney 11'; Henry 31'; Ghoddos (yellow card) 42'; Lascelles 61' (o.g.); Nørgaard (yellow card) 83'	Stadium: St James' Park; Attendance: 52,131; Referee: Robert Jones

28 November 2021 13	Brentford	1–0	Everton	Brentford
14:00 GMT	Toney 24' (pen.); Onyeka (yellow card) 43'; Canós (yellow card) 51'; Jansson (yellow card) 66'; Mbeumo (yellow card) 90+2'	Report	Townsend (yellow card) 38'; Rondón (yellow card) 66'; Godfrey (yellow card) 80'	Stadium: Brentford Community Stadium; Attendance: 16,957; Referee: Darren England

2 December 2021 14	Tottenham Hotspur	2–0	Brentford	Tottenham
19:30 GMT	Canós 12' (o.g.); Son 65'	Report		Stadium: Tottenham Hotspur Stadium; Attendance: 54,202; Referee: Jonathan Moss

5 December 2021 15	Leeds United	2–2	Brentford	Leeds
14:00 GMT	Roberts 27', (yellow card) 29'; Harrison (yellow card) 75'; Klich (yellow card) 79'; Raphinha (yellow card) 85'; Bamford 90+5', (yellow card) 90+5'	Report	Goode (yellow card) 45+2'; Baptiste 54'; Canós (yellow card) 56', (goal) 61'; Henry (yellow card) 80'	Stadium: Elland Road; Attendance: 35,639; Referee: David Coote

10 December 2021 16	Brentford	2–1	Watford	Brentford
20:00 GMT	Janelt (yellow card) 68'; Jansson (yellow card) 70', (goal) 84'; Goode (yellow card) 81'; Onyeka (yellow card) 90+1'; Mbeumo 90+6' (pen.)	Report	Dennis 24'	Stadium: Brentford Community Stadium; Attendance: 16,861; Referee: Michael Oliver

26 December 2021 19	Brighton & Hove Albion	2–0	Brentford	Falmer
20:00 GMT	Trossard 34'; Maupay 42'; Webster (yellow card) 59'	Report	Sørensen (yellow card) 38'; Nørgaard (yellow card) 45'; Toney (yellow card) 77'	Stadium: Falmer Stadium; Attendance: 30,141; Referee: Darren England

29 December 2021 20	Brentford	0–1	Manchester City	Brentford
20:15 GMT		Report	Foden 16'	Stadium: Brentford Community Stadium; Attendance: 17,009; Referee: David Coote

2 January 2022 21	Brentford	2–1	Aston Villa	Brentford
14:00 GMT	Onyeka (yellow card) 31'; Wissa 42'; Toney (yellow card) 77'; Roerslev 83'	Report	Ings 16'; Ramsey (yellow card) 30'; McGinn (yellow card) 89'	Stadium: Brentford Community Stadium; Attendance: 16,876; Referee: Craig Pawson

11 January 2022 18	Southampton	4–1	Brentford	Southampton
19:45 GMT	Bednarek 5'; Fernández 37' (o.g.); Broja 49'; Adams 70'	Report	Janelt 23'; Toney (yellow card) 45+2'	Stadium: St Mary's Stadium; Attendance: 27,383; Referee: Stuart Attwell
Note: The match was originally scheduled for 18 December 2021 but was postponed after a COVID-19 outbreak occurred amongst Brentford's first team squad and staff. It was rescheduled to 11 January 2022.

16 January 2022 22	Liverpool	3–0	Brentford	Liverpool
14:00 GMT	Fabinho 44'; Oxlade-Chamberlain 69'; Minamino 77'	Report	Ajer (yellow card) 19'	Stadium: Anfield; Attendance: 52,824; Referee: Jonathan Moss

19 January 2022 17	Brentford	1–3	Manchester United	Brentford
20:00 GMT	Toney 85'	Report	Elanga 55'; Greenwood 62'; Rashford 77'	Stadium: Brentford Community Stadium; Attendance: 17,094; Referee: Andre Marriner
Note: The match was originally scheduled for 14 December 2021, but was postponed after a COVID-19 outbreak occurred on Manchester United's training camp.

22 January 2022 23	Brentford	1–2	Wolverhampton Wanderers	Brentford
15:00 GMT	Toney 71'; Jansson (yellow card) 75'; Nørgaard (yellow card) 83'	Report	Moutinho 48'; Neves (yellow card) 60', (goal) 78'; Toti (yellow card) 70'; Sá (yellow card) 90+1'	Stadium: Brentford Community Stadium; Attendance: 16,982; Referee: Peter Bankes

9 February 2022 24	Manchester City	2–0	Brentford	Manchester
19:45 GMT	Mahrez 40' (pen.); De Bruyne 69'	Report		Stadium: City of Manchester Stadium; Attendance: 51,658; Referee: Darren England

12 February 2022 25	Brentford	0–0	Crystal Palace	Brentford
15:00 GMT	Canós (yellow card) 42'	Report		Stadium: Brentford Community Stadium; Attendance: 16,958; Referee: Simon Hooper

19 February 2022 26	Arsenal	2–1	Brentford	Holloway
15:00 GMT	Smith Rowe 48'; Saka 79'; Gabriel (yellow card) 86'	Report	Jansson (yellow card) 81'; Nørgaard 90+3'	Stadium: Emirates Stadium; Attendance: 60,000; Referee: Jonathan Moss

26 February 2022 27	Brentford	0–2	Newcastle United	Brentford
15:00 GMT	Dasilva (red card) 11'; Ajer (yellow card) 45+1'; Mbeumo (yellow card) 84'; Janelt (yellow card) 90+5'	Report	Joelinton 33'; Willock 44'; Dúbravka (yellow card) 68'	Stadium: Brentford Community Stadium; Attendance: 17,039; Referee: Mike Dean

5 March 2022 28	Norwich City	1–3	Brentford	Norwich
15:00 GMT	Gibson (yellow card) 51'; Hanley (yellow card) 79'; Pukki 90+2'	Report	Ajer (yellow card) 24'; Toney 32', 52' (pen.), 58' (pen.); Eriksen (yellow card) 40'; Jansson (yellow card) 79'; Roerslev (yellow card) 89'; Mbeumo (yellow card) 90+1'	Stadium: Carrow Road; Attendance: 26,887; Referee: Anthony Taylor

12 March 2022 29	Brentford	2–0	Burnley	Brentford
15:00 GMT	Toney 85', 90+4' (pen.), (yellow card) 86'	Report	Tarkowski (yellow card) 89'; Collins (red card) 90+2'	Stadium: Brentford Community Stadium; Attendance: 16,984; Referee: Paul Tierney

20 March 2022 30	Leicester City	2–1	Brentford	Leicester
14:00 GMT	Castagne 20'; Maddison 33'; Dewsbury-Hall (yellow card) 76'	Report	Pinnock (yellow card) 83'; Wissa 85'; Nørgaard (yellow card) 90'	Stadium: King Power Stadium; Attendance: 31,830; Referee: Darren England

2 April 2022 31	Chelsea	1–4	Brentford	Fulham
15:00 BST	Rüdiger 48'	Report	Janelt 50', 60'; Eriksen 54'; Wissa 87'	Stadium: Stamford Bridge; Attendance: 39,061; Referee: Andrew Madley

10 April 2022 32	Brentford	2–0	West Ham United	Brentford
14:00 BST	Mbeumo 48'; Toney 64'	Report	Antonio (yellow card) 66'	Stadium: Brentford Community Stadium; Attendance: 17,032; Referee: Martin Atkinson

16 April 2022 33	Watford	1–2	Brentford	Watford
15:00 BST	Kamara (yellow card) 53'; Dennis 55'; Louza (yellow card) 87'	Report	Nørgaard 15'; Toney (yellow card) 62'; Jansson 90+5'	Stadium: Vicarage Road; Attendance: 20,747; Referee: Simon Hooper

23 April 2022 34	Brentford	0–0	Tottenham Hotspur	Brentford
17:30 BST	Jansson (yellow card) 66'; Sørensen (yellow card) 89'	Report	Bentancur (yellow card) 90'	Stadium: Brentford Community Stadium; Attendance: 17,072; Referee: Martin Atkinson

2 May 2022 35	Manchester United	3–0	Brentford	Manchester
20:00 BST	Fernandes 9'; Matić (yellow card) 54'; Ronaldo 61' (pen.); Varane 72'	Report		Stadium: Old Trafford; Attendance: 73,482; Referee: Chris Kavanagh

7 May 2022 36	Brentford	3–0	Southampton	Brentford
15:00 BST	Jansson 13'; Wissa 14'; Ajer 79'	Report	Diallo (yellow card) 17'	Stadium: Brentford Community Stadium; Attendance: 17,051; Referee: Michael Salisbury

15 May 2022 37	Everton	2–3	Brentford	Walton
16:30 BST	Calvert-Lewin 10'; Branthwaite (red card) 18'; Richarlison 45+2' (pen.); Rondón (red card) 88'	Report	Sørensen (yellow card) 10'; Jensen (yellow card) 27'; Coleman 37' (o.g.); Ajer (yellow card) 40'; Wissa 62'; Henry 64'	Stadium: Goodison Park; Attendance: 38,819; Referee: Michael Oliver

22 May 2022 38	Brentford	1–2	Leeds United	Brentford
16:00 BST	Raya (yellow card) 55'; Canós 78', (yellow card) 78' (yellow-red card) 80'; Toney (yellow card) 79'	Report	Raphinha 56' (pen.); Phillips (yellow card) 52'; Harrison 90+4'	Stadium: Brentford Community Stadium; Attendance: 16,957; Referee: Paul Tierney

=== FA Cup ===
8 January 2022 Third round	Port Vale	1–4	Brentford	Burslem
15:00 GMT	Harratt 70'	Report	Forss 26'; Mbeumo 66', 76', 87' (pen.)	Stadium: Vale Park; Attendance: 8,069; Referee: Thomas Bramall

5 February 2022 Fourth round	Everton	4–1	Brentford	Walton
15:00 GMT	Gomes (yellow card) 24'; Mina 31'; Richarlison 48'; Holgate 62'; Gordon (yellow card) 67'; Townsend 90+1'	Report	Roerslev (yellow card) 42'; Toney 54' (pen.)	Stadium: Goodison Park; Attendance: 39,571; Referee: Michael Oliver

=== EFL Cup ===
24 August 2021 Second round	Brentford	3–1	Forest Green Rovers	Brentford
19:45 BST	Wissa 60'; Mbeumo 75'; Forss 86'	Report	Aitchison 8'; Adams (red card) 80'	Stadium: Brentford Community Stadium; Attendance: 12,137; Referee: Will Finnie

21 September 2021 Third round	Brentford	7–0	Oldham Athletic	Brentford
19:45 BST	Forss 3' (pen.), 16', 44', 60'; Wissa 38', 87'; Diarra 43' (o.g.)	Report	Clarke (yellow card) 79'	Stadium: Brentford Community Stadium; Attendance: 12,819; Referee: Simon Hooper

27 October 2021 Fourth round	Stoke City	1–2	Brentford	Stoke-on-Trent
19:45 BST	Østigård (yellow card) 52'; Sawyers 57'	Report	Canós 22'; Toney 40'; Ghoddos (yellow card) 76'	Stadium: Bet365 Stadium; Attendance: 9,584; Referee: Michael Salisbury

22 December 2021 Quarter-finals	Brentford	0–2	Chelsea	Brentford
19:45 GMT	Janelt (yellow card) 12'; Canós (yellow card) 68'	Report	Vale (yellow card) 45'; Saúl (yellow card) 77'; Jansson 80' (o.g.); Jorginho 85' (pen.)	Stadium: Brentford Community Stadium; Attendance: 16,577; Referee: Andre Marriner

== Statistics ==
=== Appearances and goals ===
No	Pos	Nat	Name	League		FA Cup		EFL Cup		Total	
No	Pos	Nat	Name	Apps	Goals	Apps	Goals	Apps	Goals	Apps	Goals
1	GK	(Spain)	David Raya	24	0	1	0	0	0	25	0
2	DF	(England)	Dominic Thompson	2	0	1	0	2	0	5	0
3	DF	(Jamaica)	Rico Henry	33 (1)	3	1	0	1 (1)	0	35 (2)	3
4	DF	(England)	Charlie Goode	4 (2)	0	0	0	2	0	6 (2)	0
5	DF	(Jamaica)	Ethan Pinnock	32	1	1	0	2	0	35	1
6	MF	(Denmark)	Christian Nørgaard	35	3	1	0	0 (2)	0	36 (2)	3
7	MF	(Spain)	Sergi Canós	26 (5)	3	1	0	2 (1)	1	29 (6)	4
8	MF	(Denmark)	Mathias Jensen	19 (12)	0	1	0	3	0	23 (12)	0
9	FW	(Finland)	Marcus Forss	1 (6)	0	1	1	3 (1)	5	5 (7)	6
10	MF	(England)	Josh Dasilva	2 (7)	0	0 (1)	0	0	0	2 (8)	0
11	MF	(Democratic Republic of the Congo)	Yoane Wissa	12 (18)	7	1	0	3	3	16 (18)	10
14	MF	(Iran)	Saman Ghoddos	4 (13)	1	1 (1)	0	3 (1)	0	8 (15)	1
15	MF	(Nigeria)	Frank Onyeka	12 (8)	0	0	0	1 (3)	0	13 (11)	0
17	FW	(England)	Ivan Toney	32 (1)	12	1 (1)	1	1 (1)	1	34 (3)	14
18	DF	(Sweden)	Pontus Jansson	37	3	1	0	1	0	39	3
19	MF	(France)	Bryan Mbeumo	34 (1)	4	0 (1)	3	1 (1)	1	35 (3)	8
20	DF	(Norway)	Kristoffer Ajer	23 (1)	1	2	0	1 (1)	0	26 (2)	1
~~21~~	FW	(Turkey)	Halil Dervişoğlu	0	0	―		1	0	1	0
21	MF	(Denmark)	Christian Eriksen	10 (1)	1	0	0	―		10 (1)	1
22	DF	(Denmark)	Zanka	6 (2)	1	0	0	2	0	8 (2)	1
24	MF	(Ghana)	Tariqe Fosu	0 (1)	0	0	0	1 (1)	0	1 (2)	0
25	MF	(England)	Myles Peart-Harris	0	0	0 (1)	0	0 (1)	0	0 (2)	0
26	MF	(Grenada)	Shandon Baptiste	10 (12)	1	0 (2)	0	1	0	11 (14)	1
27	MF	(Germany)	Vitaly Janelt	27 (4)	4	2	0	2	0	31 (4)	4
28	MF	(Denmark)	Mads Bidstrup	0 (4)	0	1	0	2 (1)	0	3 (5)	0
29	DF	(Denmark)	Mads Bech Sørensen	9 (2)	0	2	0	2	0	13 (2)	0
30	DF	(Denmark)	Mads Roerslev	12 (9)	1	1 (1)	0	3	0	16 (10)	1
36	DF	(Wales)	Fin Stevens	0 (1)	0	1 (1)	0	0 (1)	0	1 (3)	0
43	FW	(England)	Nathan Young-Coombes	0 (1)	0	0	0	0	0	0 (1)	0
Players loaned in during the season
40	GK	(Spain)	Álvaro Fernández	12	0	0	0	4	0	16	0
49	GK	(Denmark)	Jonas Lössl	2	0	1	0	―		3	0

- Source: Soccerbase

=== Goalscorers ===
No	Pos	Nat	Player	PL	FAC	EFLC	Total
17	FW	(England)	Ivan Toney	12	1	1	14
11	MF	(Democratic Republic of the Congo)	Yoane Wissa	7	0	3	10
19	MF	(France)	Bryan Mbeumo	4	3	1	8
9	FW	(Finland)	Marcus Forss	0	1	5	6
7	MF	(Spain)	Sergi Canós	3	0	1	4
27	MF	(Germany)	Vitaly Janelt	4	0	0	4
3	DF	(Jamaica)	Rico Henry	3	0	0	3
18	DF	(Sweden)	Pontus Jansson	3	0	0	3
6	MF	(Denmark)	Christian Nørgaard	3	0	0	3
20	DF	(Norway)	Kristoffer Ajer	1	0	0	1
26	MF	(Grenada)	Shandon Baptiste	1	0	0	1
21	MF	(Denmark)	Christian Eriksen	1	0	0	1
14	MF	(Iran)	Saman Ghoddos	1	0	0	1
5	DF	(Jamaica)	Ethan Pinnock	1	0	0	1
30	DF	(Denmark)	Mads Roerslev	1	0	0	1
22	DF	(Denmark)	Zanka	1	0	0	1
Opponents				2	0	1	3
Total				48	5	12	64

- Source: Soccerbase, FBREF

=== Discipline ===
No	Pos	Nat	Player	PL		FAC		EFLC		Total		Pts
No	Pos	Nat	Player	Yellow card	Red card	Yellow card	Red card	Yellow card	Red card	Yellow card	Red card	Pts
7	MF	(Spain)	Sergi Canós	8	1	0	0	1	0	9	1	12
6	MF	(Denmark)	Christian Nørgaard	8	0	0	0	0	0	8	0	8
17	FW	(England)	Ivan Toney	8	0	0	0	0	0	8	0	8
18	DF	(Sweden)	Pontus Jansson	7	0	0	0	0	0	7	0	7
20	DF	(Norway)	Kristoffer Ajer	5	0	0	0	0	0	5	0	5
19	MF	(France)	Bryan Mbeumo	4	0	0	0	0	0	4	0	4
15	MF	(Nigeria)	Frank Onyeka	4	0	0	0	0	0	4	0	4
27	MF	(Germany)	Vitaly Janelt	3	0	0	0	1	0	4	0	4
10	MF	(England)	Josh Dasilva	0	1	0	0	0	0	0	1	3
4	DF	(England)	Charlie Goode	3	0	0	0	0	0	3	0	3
29	DF	(Denmark)	Mads Bech Sørensen	3	0	0	0	0	0	3	0	3
14	MF	(Iran)	Saman Ghoddos	2	0	0	0	1	0	3	0	3
26	MF	(Grenada)	Shandon Baptiste	2	0	0	0	0	0	2	0	2
3	DF	(Jamaica)	Rico Henry	2	0	0	0	0	0	2	0	2
22	DF	(Denmark)	Zanka	2	0	0	0	0	0	2	0	2
30	DF	(Denmark)	Mads Roerslev	1	0	1	0	0	0	2	0	2
21	MF	(Denmark)	Christian Eriksen	1	0	0	0	―		1	0	1
5	DF	(Jamaica)	Ethan Pinnock	1	0	0	0	0	0	1	0	1
1	GK	(Spain)	David Raya	1	0	0	0	0	0	1	0	1
Total				65	2	1	0	3	0	69	2	75

- Source: FBREF

=== International caps ===
No	Pos	Nat	Player	Caps	Goals	Ref
1	GK	(Spain)	David Raya	1	0	
5	DF	(Jamaica)	Ethan Pinnock	4	0	
6	MF	(Denmark)	Christian Nørgaard	8	1	
8	MF	(Denmark)	Mathias Jensen	7	0	
9	FW	(Finland)	Marcus Forss	7	1	
11	MF	(Democratic Republic of the Congo)	Yoane Wissa	4	1	
14	MF	(Iran)	Saman Ghoddos	5	0	
15	MF	(Nigeria)	Frank Onyeka	6	0	
20	DF	(Norway)	Kristoffer Ajer	3	0	
~~21~~	FW	(Turkey)	Halil Dervişoğlu	7	5	
21	MF	(Denmark)	Christian Eriksen	6	2	

- Only international caps won while contracted to Brentford are counted.

== Awards ==
- Supporters' Player of the Year: Christian Nørgaard
- Players' Player of the Year: Christian Nørgaard
- FA Cup Team of the Round: Bryan Mbeumo (third round)
- EFL Cup Team of the Tournament: Marcus Forss, Saman Ghoddos
- EFL Cup Team of the Round:
  - Marcus Forss, Charlie Goode, Yoane Wissa (third round)
  - Ivan Toney (fourth round)
- EFL Cup Goal of the Tournament: Yoane Wissa
- EFL Cup Goal of the Round: Yoane Wissa (third round)

== See also ==
- 2021–22 in English football
- List of Brentford F.C. seasons
