= Nathan Young-Coombes =

English footballer (born 2003)

Personal information
- Full name: Nathan Jay Young-Coombes
- Date of birth: 15 January 2003 (age 23)
- Place of birth: Sutton, England
- Height: 1.75 m (5 ft 9 in)
- Position: Forward

Team information
- Current team: Carshalton Athletic

Youth career
- 2010–2017: Crystal Palace
- 2017–2019: Chelsea
- 2019–2021: Rangers
- 2021–2022: Brentford

Senior career*
| Years | Team | Apps | (Gls) |
| 2022–2024 | Brentford | 1 | (0) |
| 2022–2023 | → AFC Wimbledon (loan) | 11 | (3) |
| 2025 | Wealdstone | 4 | (0) |
| 2026– | Carshalton Athletic | 10 | (5) |

International career
| 2017–2018 | England U15 | 6 | (2) |
| 2018 | England U16 | 1 | (0) |
| 2019 | England U17 | 3 | (1) |
- * Club domestic league appearances and goals as of 12:41, 9 August 2026 (UTC)

Nathan Jay Young-Coombes (born 15 January 2003) is an English professional footballer who plays as a forward for Isthmian League Premier Division club Carshalton Athletic.

Young-Coombes is a product of the Crystal Palace, Chelsea and Rangers academies and began his professional career with Brentford in 2021. Though he managed one Premier League appearance, he was confined to B team football until his release in 2024. After a year out of football, Young-Coombes resumed his career in non-League football. He was capped by England at youth level.

== Club career ==
=== Early years ===
A forward, Young-Coombes joined the Crystal Palace Academy at the age of seven. He moved on to the Chelsea Academy in 2017 and to the Rangers Academy in February 2019. During nearly 2 1/2 years at Auchenhowie, Young-Coombes won the 2019 Al Kass International Cup and 2018–19 Scottish Youth Cup with the youth teams and progressed into the B team. He was released when his contract expired at the end of the 2020–21 season.

=== Brentford ===
On 9 June 2021, Young-Coombes signed a three-year contract, with an option of a further year, with the B team at Brentford. He transferred for an undisclosed fee, with the contract effective 1 July 2021. Prolific goalscoring for the B team saw Young-Coombes called into the first team squad during the 2021–22 season and he remained an unused substitute during eight matches, before finally making his senior debut as a late substitute for Mathias Jensen after 87 minutes of a 3–0 Premier League win over Southampton on 7 May 2022. He was a part of the B team's 2021–22 London Senior Cup-winning squad and his 34 B team goals were recognised with the Brentford B Player of the Year award.

On 29 July 2022, Young-Coombes joined League Two club AFC Wimbledon on a season-long loan. During an injury-affected spell that was ended early on 20 January 2023, he made 13 appearances and scored three goals. Young-Coombes returned to match play with the B team on 20 March 2023. He made two appearances during the latter stages of the team's 2022–23 Premier League Cup campaign and scored in the 2–0 Final victory over Blackburn Rovers.

Young-Coombes made a second-half substitute appearance during Brentford's opening 2023–24 first team pre-season friendly. An ankle injury saw Young-Coombes miss nearly four mid-season months and he failed to win a call into a first team matchday squad during the 2023–24 season. Young-Coombes was released when his contract expired at the end of the 2023–24 season.

=== Non-League football ===
After remaining a free agent during the 2024–25 season, Young-Coombes signed a short-term contract with National League club Wealdstone on 7 August 2025. He made six appearances before his contract was reported to have expired on 28 November 2025. On 6 March 2026, Young-Coombes transferred to Isthmian League Premier Division club Carshalton Athletic. Young-Coombes' five goals in 9 appearances helped the club narrowly avoid relegation, which was recognised with the club's Newcomer of the Year award. He signed a new contract at the end of the 2025–26.

== International career ==
Young-Coombes was capped by England at U15, U16 and U17 level.

== Personal life ==
Young-Coombes attended Woodcote High School and Strathallan School.

== Career statistics ==
As of match played 8 August 2026

Appearances and goals by club, season and competition
| Club | Season | League | | | National cup (Note: Includes FA Cup) | | League cup (Note: Includes EFL Cup, National League Cup) | | Other | | Total | |
| Club | Season | Division | Apps | Goals | Apps | Goals | Apps | Goals | Apps | Goals | Apps | Goals |
|---|---|---|---|---|---|---|---|---|---|---|---|---|
| Rangers U20 | 2019–20 | ― | | | | | | | 4 (Note: Appearances in Scottish Challenge Cup) | 1 | 4 | 1 |
| Brentford | 2021–22 | Premier League | 1 | 0 | 0 | 0 | 0 | 0 | ― | | 1 | 0 |
| AFC Wimbledon (loan) | 2022–23 | League Two | 11 | 3 | 0 | 0 | 1 | 0 | 1 (Note: Appearance in EFL Trophy) | 0 | 13 | 3 |
| Wealdstone | 2025–26 | National League | 4 | 0 | 0 | 0 | 2 | 0 | 0 | 0 | 6 | 0 |
| Carshalton Athletic | 2025–26 | Isthmian League Premier Division | 9 | 5 | ― | | ― | | ― | | 9 | 5 |
| Carshalton Athletic | 2026–27 | Isthmian League Premier Division | 1 | 0 | 0 | 0 | ― | | 0 | 0 | 1 | 0 |
| Carshalton Athletic | Total | | 10 | 5 | 0 | 0 | ― | | 0 | 0 | 10 | 5 |
| Career total | | | 26 | 8 | 0 | 0 | 3 | 0 | 5 | 1 | 34 | 9 |

== Honours ==
Brentford B

- London Senior Cup: 2021–22
- Premier League Cup: 2022–23

Individual

- Crystal Palace Academy Player of the Month: November 2016
- Brentford B Player of the Year: 2021–22
- Carshalton Athletic Newcomer of the Year: 2025–26
