= Hans Mpongo =

Dutch footballer (born 2003)

Personal information
- Full name: Hans Kamta Mpongo
- Date of birth: 26 March 2003 (age 23)
- Place of birth: Deventer, Netherlands
- Height: 1.86 m (6 ft 1 in)
- Positions: Winger; forward

Team information
- Current team: Cork City
- Number: 10

Youth career
- TAC '90
- Andover Town
- 2022: Brentford
- 2023: NAC

Senior career*
Years	Team	Apps	(Gls)
2021	Needham Market	2	(0)
2022	Brentford	0	(0)
2022	→ ÍBV (loan)	4	(0)
2022	Þróttur Vogum	9	(3)
2024	Tabor	11	(3)
2024–2025	Rijnvogels	23	(9)
2025	Finn Harps	12	(6)
2026–	Cork City	36	(14)
- * Club domestic league appearances and goals as of 16:29, 10 November 2026 (UTC)

Hans Kamta Mpongo (born 26 March 2003) is a Dutch professional footballer who plays as a winger or forward for League of Ireland Premier Division club Cork City.

== Early life ==
Mpongo was born on 26 March 2003 in the Deventer, Netherlands and has a younger brother. He is of Congolese descent. Growing up in The Hague, Netherlands, he moved with his family to London, England in 2016.

== Career ==
As a youth player, Mpongo joined the youth academy of Dutch side TAC '90. Following his stint there, he joined the youth academy of English side Andover Town. Afterwards, he signed for English side Needham Market, where he played in the FA Trophy.

In 2022, he signed for English Premier League side Brentford, where he made zero league appearances and scored zero goals. The same year, he was sent on loan to Icelandic side ÍBV, where he made four league appearances and scored zero goals, before signing for Icelandic side Þróttur Vogum, where he made nine league appearances and scored three goals.

During the summer of 2023, he joined the youth academy of Dutch side NAC. Six months later, he signed for Slovenian side Tabor, where he made eleven league appearances and scored three goals. Subsequently, he signed for Irish side Finn Harps in 2025, where he became the first Dutch player to sign for the club and made twelve league appearances and scored six goals. Ahead of the 2026 season, he signed for Irish side Cork City.

== Style of play ==
Mpongo plays as a winger or forward. Dutch newspaper Leidsch Dagblad wrote in 2024 that he "is fast, strong, and possesses a powerful shot".

== Career statistics ==
As of match played 16 October 2026

Appearances and goals by club, season and competition
Club	Season	League			National Cup (Note: Includes FA Cup, Icelandic Football Cup, Slovenian Football Cup, KNVB Cup & FAI Cup)		Other		Total	
Club	Season	Division	Apps	Goals	Apps	Goals	Apps	Goals	Apps	Goals
Needham Market	2021–22	Southern Football League	2	0	0	0	1 (Note: Appearance in the FA Trophy)	0	3	0
Brentford	2021–22	Premier League	0	0	0	0	—		0	0
ÍBV (loan)	2022	Besta deild karla	4	0	1	0	—		5	0
Þróttur Vogum	2022	1. deild karla	9	3	—		—		9	3
Tabor	2023–24	Slovenian Second League	11	3	0	0	—		11	3
Rijnvogels	2023–24	Derde Divisie	23	9	1	0	—		24	9
Finn Harps	2025	LOI First Division	12	6	3	2	—		15	8
Cork City	2026	LOI First Division	36	14	1	0	0 (Note: Appearance(s) in the Munster Senior Cup)	0	37	14
Career total			97	35	6	2	1	0	104	37
