= Jason Holt =

Scottish footballer

Personal information
- Full name: Jason Derek Holt
- Date of birth: 19 February 1993 (age 33)
- Place of birth: Musselburgh, Scotland
- Height: 1.68 m (5 ft 6 in)
- Position: Midfielder

Team information
- Current team: St Johnstone
- Number: 7

Youth career
- 2000–2002: Musselburgh Windsor
- 2002–2011: Heart of Midlothian

Senior career*
Years	Team	Apps	(Gls)
2011–2015	Heart of Midlothian	62	(7)
2011–2012	→ Raith Rovers (loan)	5	(1)
2015	→ Sheffield United (loan)	16	(5)
2015–2020	Rangers	89	(13)
2018–2019	→ Fleetwood Town (loan)	33	(1)
2019–2020	→ St Johnstone (loan)	17	(0)
2020–2024	Livingston	133	(2)
2024–	St Johnstone	63	(1)

International career
2010–2011	Scotland U19	9	(2)
2012	Scotland U20	1	(0)
2011–2013	Scotland U21	7	(0)
- * Club domestic league appearances and goals as of 4 May 2026

Jason Derek Holt (born 19 February 1993) is a Scottish professional footballer who plays as a midfielder for Scottish Premiership club St Johnstone.

Holt has also previously played for Heart of Midlothian, Raith Rovers, Sheffield United, Fleetwood Town and St Johnstone, the latter two while on loan from Rangers. He represented Scotland at under-19, under-20 and under-21 level.

== Club career ==
=== Heart of Midlothian ===
Holt grew up in Musselburgh as a Hearts fan and attended Musselburgh Grammar School before signing for Heart of Midlothian in 2002. He was a member of the Hearts under-19 squad who finished second behind Celtic in the under-19 league in 2010–11. He picked up the Clydesdale Bank Premier League under-19 player of the season award.

Despite being part of the squad that travelled to Italy for pre season, Holt had to wait until the last day of the 2010–11 season to make his First team debut on 15 May 2011 as a substitute against Dundee United. His performance for the under 19 squad in the early part of the 2011–12 season earned him a new three-year contract extending his stay with the club until 2014. He scored on his first start for Hearts, away to St Johnstone in March 2012.

With Hearts in financial difficulty and wanting to bring through members of their under 19 squad into the first team, Holt was sent on loan to Raith Rovers to gain first team experience.

==== Loan spells ====
On 21 November 2011, after impressing in a bounce game, Holt joined Scottish First Division side Raith Rovers on loan until 5 January 2012. Making his debut on 26 November 2011 scoring the first goal in the ninth minute in their 3–2 win against Hamilton. In all Holt made five appearances for the side with his last appearance coming as a substitute on 2 January against Dundee. On 5 January he returned to Hearts.

Holt moved on loan to Sheffield United on 30 January 2015 for the rest of the 2014–15 season.

=== Rangers ===
On 22 July 2015, Holt signed a three-year deal with Rangers after impressing on a trial spell. The Ibrox side agreed a development compensation fee of £65,000 with Heart of Midlothian. Holt scored his first goal for Rangers in a 5–1 win over Alloa Athletic. He scored a brace against title rivals Hibernian in a 4–2 win for Rangers. Holt was named in the Championship team of the year for 2015–16, as Rangers won promotion to the Scottish Premiership.

Holt made 33 appearances and scored two goals for Rangers during the 2017–18 season, but was made available for transfer by new manager Steven Gerrard in June 2018.

==== Fleetwood Town (Loan) ====
On 18 June 2018, Holt was loaned to Fleetwood Town, managed by his former Rangers teammate Joey Barton. Following an injury against Accrington Stanley on 30 March 2019, Holt completed his loan and returned to Rangers. Holt played in 36 games in all competitions and scored two goals for Fleetwood.

==== St Johnstone (Loan) ====
On 2 September 2019, Holt signed on loan for St Johnstone until the end of the 2019–20 season.

=== Livingston ===
On 11 August 2020, Holt signed for Livingston, on a two-year deal.

=== St Johnstone return ===
In August 2024, Holt signed for St Johnstone for a second spell.

== International career ==
Holt has represented Scotland at under-19 level and under-20 level and was called up to the under-21 squad in 2011, making his debut a year later.

== Career statistics ==
As of 5 July 2022

Appearances and goals by club, season and competition
Club	Season	League			National cup (Note: Includes Scottish Cup, FA Cup)		League cup (Note: Includes Scottish League Cup, EFL Cup)		Other		Total	
Club	Season	Division	Apps	Goals	Apps	Goals	Apps	Goals	Apps	Goals	Apps	Goals
Hearts	2010–11	Scottish Premier League	1	0	0	0	0	0	0	0	1	0
Hearts	2011–12	Scottish Premier League	2	1	0	0	0	0	0	0	2	1
Hearts	2012–13	Scottish Premier League	21	3	0	0	2	0	0	0	23	3
Hearts	2013–14	Scottish Premiership	23	1	0	0	3	0	0	0	26	1
Hearts	2014–15	Scottish Championship	15	2	1	0	2	0	1 (Note: Appearance(s) in Scottish Challenge Cup)	0	18	2
Hearts	Total		62	7	1	0	7	0	1	0	71	7
Raith Rovers (loan)	2011–12	Scottish First Division	5	1	0	0	0	0	0	0	5	1
Sheffield United (loan)	2014–15	Football League One	16	5	0	0	0	0	1 (Note: Appearance in Football League One play-offs)	0	17	5
Rangers	2015–16	Scottish Championship	32	10	6	1	2	0	5	1	45	12
Rangers	2016–17	Scottish Premiership	31	0	4	0	4	1	0	0	39	1
Rangers	2017–18	Scottish Premiership	26	2	3	0	2	0	1 (Note: Appearance in UEFA Europa League)	0	32	2
Rangers	2018–19	Scottish Premiership	0	0	0	0	0	0	0	0	0	0
Rangers	2019–20	Scottish Premiership	0	0	0	0	0	0	0	0	0	0
Rangers	Total		89	12	13	1	8	1	6	1	116	15
Fleetwood Town (loan)	2018–19	EFL League One	33	1	1	0	1	1	1 (Note: Appearance in EFL Trophy)	0	36	2
St Johnstone (loan)	2019–20	Scottish Premiership	17	0	0	0	0	0	—		17	0
Livingston	2020–21	Scottish Premiership	30	1	2	0	7	0	—		39	1
Livingston	2021–22	Scottish Premiership	37	1	2	0	5	0	—		44	1
Livingston	Total		67	2	4	0	12	0	—		83	1
Career total			289	28	19	1	28	2	9	1	345	32

== Honours ==
=== Club ===
Heart of Midlothian

- Scottish Championship: 2014–15

Rangers

- Scottish Championship: 2015–16
- Scottish Challenge Cup: 2015–16

St Johnstone

- Scottish Championship: 2025–26

=== Individual ===
- Scottish Premier Under-19 League Player of the Year: 2010–11
- Scottish Championship PFA Scotland Team of the Year: 2015–16
