= 2026–27 KV Kortrijk season =

KV Kortrijk
2026–27 season
- Stadium: Guldensporen Stadion
- Belgian Pro League: Pre-season
- Belgian Cup: Pre-season

The 2026–27 season is the 126th season in the history of Koninklijke Voetbalclub Kortrijk and their first season back in the Belgian Pro League following promotion. The club will also compete in the Belgian Cup.

== Transfers ==
=== In ===
Pos.	Player	Transferred from	Fee	Date	Source
MF	(Belgium) Boris Lambert	(Netherlands) Willem II Tilburg	Loan made permanent	1 July 2026	
MF	(Japan) Ken Masui	(Japan) Nagoya Grampus	Loan	1 July 2026	
MF	(Israel) Suf Podgoreanu	(Israel) Maccabi Haifa	Free	1 July 2026	

=== Out ===
Pos.	Player	Transferred to	Fee	Date	Source
FW	(Belgium) Kyan Himpe	(Belgium) Lierse	Loan	1 July 2026	
FW	(Senegal) Mouhamed Guèye	(Finland) HJK Helsinki	Undisclosed	1 July 2026	
FW	(Belgium) Ilan Hurtevent	(Belgium) Union Saint-Gilloise	Undisclosed	1 July 2026	
FW	(Republic of Ireland) Jonathan Afolabi	(Republic of Ireland) Shamrock Rovers	Free	5 July 2026	

== Pre-season and friendlies ==
17 June 2026 Friendly	KFC Marke (Belgium)	1–4	(Belgium) Kortrijk
19:30

20 June 2026 Friendly	KWSC Lauwe (Belgium)	0–6	(Belgium) Kortrijk
16:00

27 June 2026 Friendly	KV Diksmuide-Oostende (Belgium)	1–5	(Belgium) Kortrijk
15:00

4 July 2026 Friendly	Club Brugge (Belgium)	4–2	(Belgium) Kortrijk
14:00	Meijer 29'; Campbell 38'; 50', 90+2'		15', 76'

18 July 2026 Friendly	Kortrijk (Belgium)	1–1	(France) Valenciennes
12:00	27'		88'

18 July 2026 Friendly	Harelbeke (Belgium)	1–0	(Belgium) Kortrijk
18:00	75'

25 July 2026 Friendly	Kortrijk (Belgium)	1–1	(France) Amiens
16:00

== Competitions ==
=== Overall record ===
Competition	First match	Last match	Starting round	Record							
Competition	First match	Last match	Starting round	Pld	W	D	L	GF	GA	GD	Win %
Belgian Pro League	7 August 2026		Matchday 1	0	0	0	0	0	0	+0	—
Belgian Cup				0	0	0	0	0	0	+0	—
Total				0	0	0	0	0	0	+0	—

Source: Competitions

=== Belgian Pro League ===
Pos	Team	Pld	W	D	L	GF	GA	GD	Pts	Qualification or relegation
14	OH Leuven	10	2	3	5	10	17	−7	9	
15	Sint-Truiden	10	2	2	6	18	21	−3	8	
16	La Louvière	10	2	1	7	13	23	−10	7	
17	Cercle Brugge	10	1	3	6	13	22	−9	6	Relegation to Challenger Pro League
18	Kortrijk	10	1	1	8	4	22	−18	4	Relegation to Challenger Pro League

Updated to match(es) played on 6 November 2026. Source: Jupiler Pro League (in Dutch)
Rules for classification: 1) Points; 2) Matches won; 3) Goal difference; 4) Goals scored; 5) Away matches won; 6) Away goal difference; 7) Away goals scored; 8) Play-off.

==== Matches ====
7 August 2026 1	Club Brugge	v	Kortrijk	Bruges
20:45				Stadium: Jan Breydel Stadium
