= Kyle McClean =

Northern Irish footballer

Personal information
- Date of birth: 3 October 1998 (age 28)
- Place of birth: Belfast, Northern Ireland
- Position: Midfielder

Team information
- Current team: Linfield
- Number: 8

Youth career
- –2016: Crusaders
- 2016–2017: Nottingham Forest

Senior career*
Years	Team	Apps	(Gls)
2017–2019	St Johnstone	13	(1)
2019	→ Linfield (loan)	10	(1)
2020–	Linfield	169	(24)

International career
2014–2015	Northern Ireland U17	3	(0)
2016	Northern Ireland U19	3	(1)
2018–	Northern Ireland U21	7	(0)
- * Club domestic league appearances and goals as of 29 April 2026

Kyle McClean (born 3 October 1998) is a Northern Irish professional footballer who plays as a midfielder for NIFL Premiership club Linfield. He has previously played for St Johnstone.

== Career ==
McClean started his career in England at Nottingham Forest. After his release by Forest in the summer of 2017 he went on trial at St Johnstone. After a successful trial with the club, St Johnstone announced his signing on 5 June 2017 and he was named in the first team squad for the 2017–18 season. McClean made his league debut in November 2017, and extended his contract with St Johnstone by a year in December. McClean moved on loan to Linfield in January 2019. Upon his return to St Johnstone, he signed a new one-year contract. However, he left St Johnstone on 2 September 2019, with his contract being cancelled by mutual consent. He later re-signed permanently for Linfield in January 2020.

== International career ==
McClean has represented Northern Ireland in youth internationals.

== Career statistics ==
As of 2 September 2019

Club	Season	League			National Cup		League Cup		Other		Total	
Club	Season	Division	Apps	Goals	Apps	Goals	Apps	Goals	Apps	Goals	Apps	Goals
St Johnstone	2017–18	Scottish Premiership	5	0	1	1	0	0	1 (Note: Appearances for St Johnstone under-20s/21s in the Scottish Challenge Cup in which age-restricted sides from the Scottish Premiership clubs compete against senior clubs)	0	7	1
St Johnstone	2018–19	Scottish Premiership	0	0	0	0	2	0	1	0	2	0
St Johnstone	2019–20	Scottish Premiership	0	0	0	0	3	0	0	0	3	0
St Johnstone	Total		5	0	1	1	5	0	2	0	13	1
Linfield (loan)	2018–19	NIFL Premiership	8	1	1	0	1	0	0	0	10	1
Career total			13	1	2	1	6	0	2	0	23	2
