= Eetu Vertainen =

Finnish footballer (born 1999)

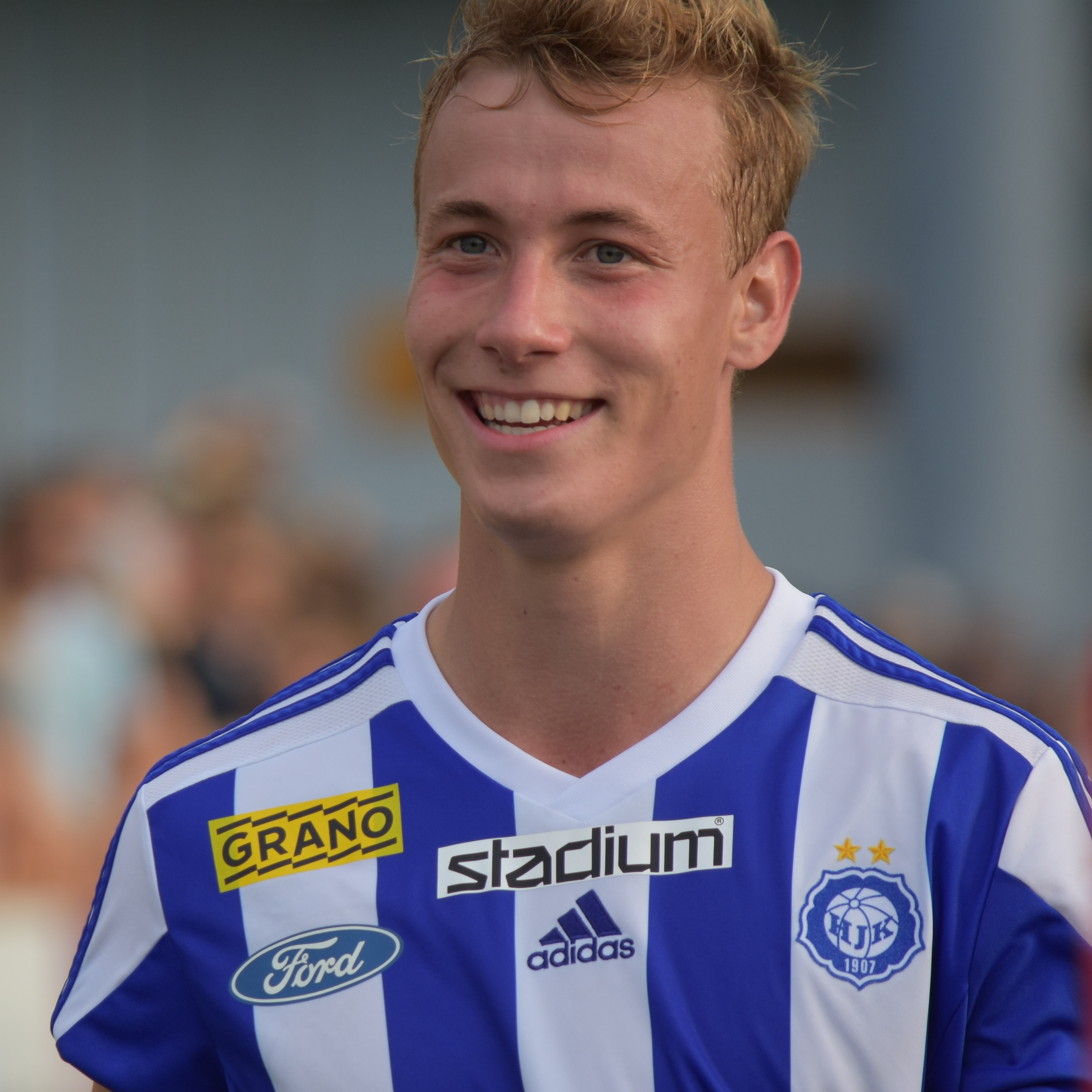
- Vertainen with HJK in 2018

Personal information
- Date of birth: 11 May 1999 (age 27)
- Place of birth: Espoo, Finland
- Height: 1.89 m (6 ft 2 in)
- Position: Striker

Team information
- Current team: Guidonia
- Number: 9

Youth career
- KyIF
- HJK

Senior career*
Years	Team	Apps	(Gls)
2016–2020	Klubi 04	41	(13)
2017–2020	HJK	57	(8)
2021	Ilves	11	(4)
2021–2023	St Johnstone	7	(0)
2022	→ Linfield (loan)	10	(4)
2022–2023	→ Linfield (loan)	30	(17)
2023–2026	Triestina	70	(18)
2023	→ Athens Kallithea (loan)	3	(0)
2026–	Guidonia	2	(2)

International career
- Finland U19
	Finland U21	4	(1)
- * Club domestic league appearances and goals as of 30 August 2026

Eetu Vertainen (born 11 May 1999) is a Finnish professional footballer who plays as a striker for Serie C Group B club Guidonia.

== Career ==
Vertainen began his youth career with KyIF, before joining the academy of HJK at the age of 11. He started his senior career with Klubi 04, before playing for HJK and Ilves in the Veikkausliiga.

Vertainen signed a two-year contract with Scottish club St Johnstone on 1 September 2021.

He moved on loan to NIFL Premiership club Linfield on 7 February 2022. On 19 March, he scored four goals in a 5–0 league win over Dungannon Swifts.

On 30 June, his loan deal with the Northern Irish team was extended. Following his performances, he was named the league's Player of the Month and won the Goal of the Month award for December 2022. In January 2023, he scored hat-tricks in successive league matches. Later in the same season, he was the subject of speculation about a permanent transfer to Linfield, as well as links to Welsh club The New Saints.

On 1 September 2023, Vertainen joined Serie C club Triestina on a permanent deal. Since Triestina were unable to register him on time, on 11 September he was loaned to Super League Greece 2 club Athens Kallithea until the end of the year, with an option to extend the deal for the rest of the 2023–24 season. In January 2024, Vertainen returned to Triestina, and made his Serie C debut on 7 January 2024, as a starter in a match against Trento.

== International career ==
Vertainen is a former Finnish youth international.

== Career statistics ==
As of 11 March 2026

Appearances and goals by club, season and competition
Club	Season	League			Cup (Note: Includes Suomen Cup, Scottish Cup, Irish Cup and Greek Cup)		Other		Europe		Total	
Club	Season	Division	Apps	Goals	Apps	Goals	Apps	Goals	Apps	Goals	Apps	Goals
Klubi 04	2016	Kakkonen	13	0	–		–		–		13	0
Klubi 04	2017	Kakkonen	21	11	3	1	–		–		24	12
Klubi 04	2018	Ykkönen	6	2	–		–		–		6	2
Klubi 04	2020	Kakkonen	1	0	–		–		–		1	0
Klubi 04	Total		41	13	3	1	0	0	0	0	44	14
HJK	2017	Veikkausliiga	1	0	1	0	–		0	0	2	0
HJK	2018	Veikkausliiga	19	4	5	3	–		3 (Note: Includes UEFA Champions League and UEFA Europa League)	0	27	7
HJK	2019	Veikkausliiga	25	2	3	1	–		2 (Note: Includes UEFA Champions League)	0	30	3
HJK	2020	Veikkausliiga	12	2	5	1	–		–		17	3
HJK	Total		57	8	14	5	0	0	5	0	76	13
Ilves	2021	Veikkausliiga	11	4	3	0	–		–		14	4
St Johnstone	2021–22	Scottish Premiership	7	0	0	0	1 (Note: Includes Scottish League Cup)	0	–		8	0
Linfield (loan)	2021–22	NIFL Premiership	10	4	–		–		–		10	4
Linfield (loan)	2022–23	NIFL Premiership	30	17	1	0	7 (Note: Includes five appearances and two goals in Irish League Cup, one appearance in Scottish Challenge Cup and one appearance in NIFL Charity Shield)	2	5 (Note: Includes UEFA Champions League, UEFA Europa League and UEFA Europa Conference League)	0	43	19
Linfield (loan)	Total		40	21	1	0	7	2	5	0	53	23
Triestina	2023–24	Serie C	13	3	–		2 (Note: Includes Serie C Promotion Play-offs)	0	–		15	3
Triestina	2024–25	Serie C	36	6	0	0	1 (Note: Includes Coppa Italia Serie C)	0	–		37	6
Triestina	2025–26	Serie C	16	7	–		1	1	–		17	8
Triestina	Total		65	16	0	0	4	1	0	0	69	17
Athens Kallithea (loan)	2023–24	Super League Greece 2	3	0	0	0	–		–		3	0
Career total			224	62	21	6	12	3	10	0	267	71
