= Jordan Northcott =

Scottish footballer

Personal information
- Date of birth: 9 February 2002 (age 24)
- Position: Forward

Team information
- Current team: Brechin City

Youth career
- St Johnstone

Senior career*
Years	Team	Apps	(Gls)
2019–2022	St Johnstone	2	(0)
2019–2020	→ BSC Glasgow (loan)		
2021	→ Forfar Athletic (loan)	6	(0)
2022	→ Brechin City (loan)	8	(1)
2022–	Brechin City	0	(0)
- * Club domestic league appearances and goals as of 01:23, 13 June 2022 (UTC)

Jordan Northcott (born 9 February 2002) is a Scottish professional footballer who plays as a forward for Brechin City.

== Career ==
Having come through St Johnstone's academy, He made his debut for St Johnstone on 3 April 2019 as a late substitute in a 2–0 win over Dundee. In October 2019, Northcott joined BSC Glasgow on loan until January 2020.

Northcott was loaned to Forfar Athletic in March 2021. On 28 February 2022, Northcott joined Highland League side Brechin City on loan for the remainder of the 2021–22 season.

On 12 June 2022, Northcott signed for Brechin on a permanent deal.
